= Great British Railway Journeys =

British documentary television series

- Genre: Travel documentary
- Presented by: Michael Portillo
- Composer: Jon Wygens
- Country of origin: United Kingdom
- Original language: English
- No. of series: 16
- No. of episodes: 290

Production
- Executive producers: Charlie Bunce (Series 1–2); John Comerford (Series 3–6)
- Producers: Fiona Caldwell (Series 1–2); Jay Taylor (Series 3); Michelle Heeley (Series 4); Alison Kreps (Series 5–6)
- Running time: 30 minutes per episode (approx.)
- Production companies: Talkback Thames (Series 1–2); Boundless (Series 3–11); Naked (Series 12–16)

Original release
- Network: BBC Two; BBC HD (2010–2013); BBC Two HD (2014–present)
- Release: 4 January 2010 – present

Related
- Great Railway Journeys; Great Continental Railway Journeys; Railways of the Great War with Michael Portillo (2014); Great American Railroad Journeys; Great Indian Railway Journeys; Great Alaskan Railroad Journeys; Great Canadian Railway Journeys; Great Australian Railway Journeys; Great Asian Railway Journeys; Great Coastal Railway Journeys; Michael Portillo's 200 Years of the Railways; Great Japanese Railway Journeys; Great Korean Railway Journeys; Great Central Asian Railway Journeys

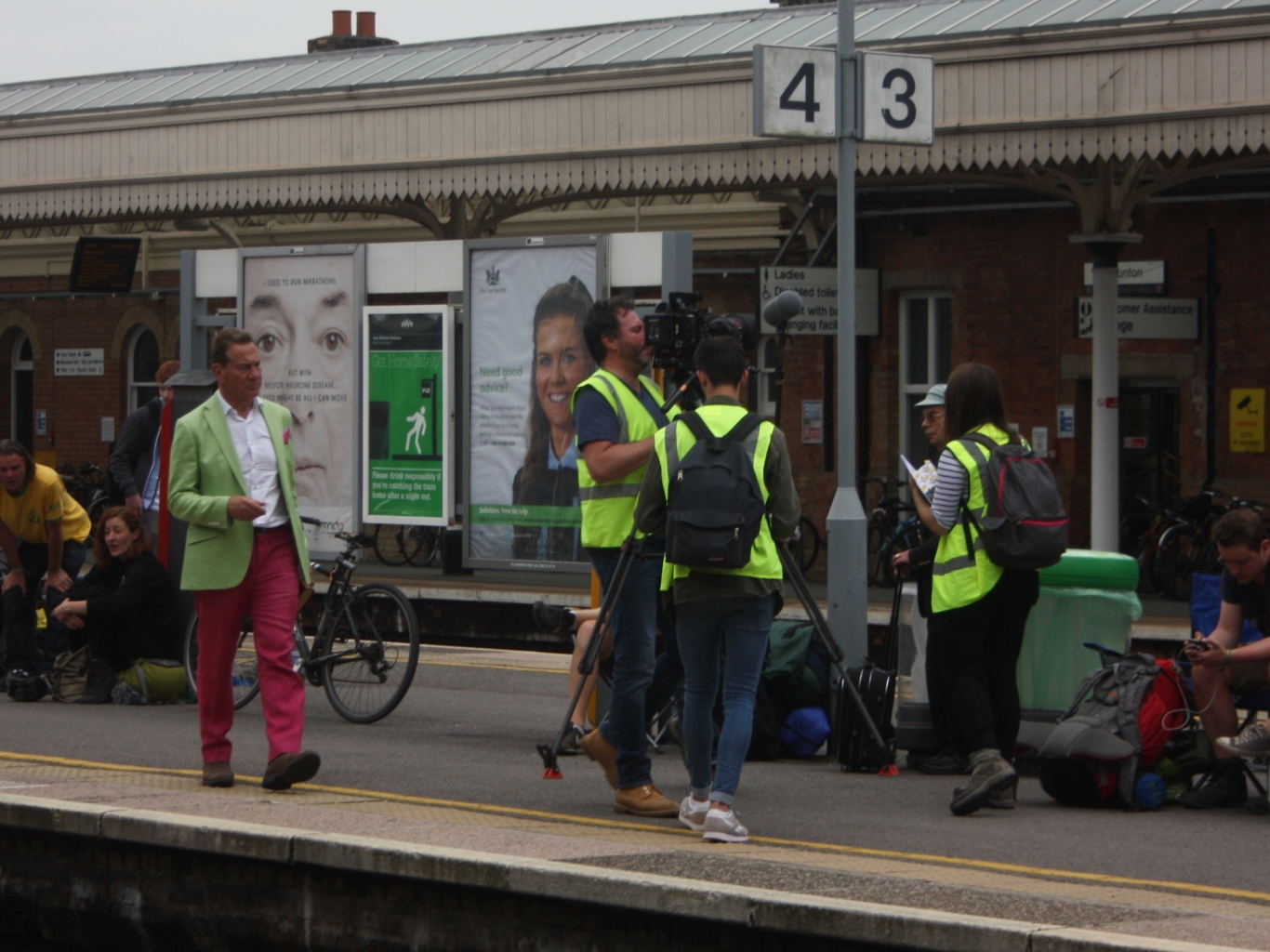
Michael Portillo during filming at Taunton station in 2017

Great British Railway Journeys is a 2010–present BBC documentary series presented by Michael Portillo, a former Conservative MP and Cabinet Minister who was instrumental in saving the Settle to Carlisle line from closure in 1989. The documentary was first broadcast in 2010 on BBC Two and has returned annually for a current total of 16 series.

The series features Portillo travelling around the railway networks of Great Britain, Ireland, and the Isle of Man, referring to Bradshaw's Guide and comparing how the various destinations have changed since; initially, he used an 1840s copy, but in later series, he used other editions. Portillo has said that sometimes he regrets the name of the programme as it is "really about history", and that whilst he likes trains, he "wouldn't say [he was] passionate about them".

Portillo has presented 8 other series with a similar format: Great Continental Railway Journeys (8 series; 2012–2025), Great American Railroad Journeys (4 series; 2016–2020), Great Indian Railway Journeys (2018), Great Alaskan Railroad Journeys and Great Canadian Railway Journeys (broadcast consecutively in January 2019), Great Australian Railway Journeys (2019), Great Asian Railway Journeys (2020), and Great Coastal Railway Journeys (3 series; 2022–2024).

== Synopsis ==
Victorian guidebooks written by George Bradshaw under the title Bradshaw's Guide were the first comprehensive timetable and travel guides to the railway system in Great Britain, which at the time, although it had grown to be extensive, still consisted of several fragmented and competing railway companies and lines, each publishing their own timetables.

Classified by the BBC in both the travel and history genres, the series features Portillo using the guide to plan his journeys, in the process visiting points of interest picked out in the guide and comparing its content with the modern world, both the physical and cultural ones.

== Format ==
Each series features Portillo travelling on a different route each week, with each daily episode being one short leg of the journey. The weekly journey is chosen to fit with a theme, either geographic, such as coast to coast, or historic. Filmed entirely on location, the series features a mix of Portillo speaking directly to camera and interviewing members of the public, local historians and celebrities and fellow travellers.

== Broadcast ==
All episodes were originally broadcast on consecutive weekdays on BBC Two, in the 6:30 pm time slot. Some series were simulcast on BBC HD before the channel's demise. Repeats have been broadcast on BBC Four as well as the original channel of BBC Two. Edited versions of the episodes, reduced to about 23 minutes (excluding commercials), have been shown on the television channel Yesterday.

Series	Episodes	Originally released	
Series	Episodes	First released	Last released
1	20	4 January 2010	29 January 2010
2	25	3 January 2011	4 February 2011
3	25	2 January 2012	3 February 2012
4	25	7 January 2013	8 February 2013
5	20	6 January 2014	31 January 2014
6	20	5 January 2015	30 January 2015
7	20	4 January 2016	29 January 2016
8	15	2 January 2017	20 January 2017
9	15	1 January 2018	19 January 2018
10	15	4 February 2019	22 February 2019
11	15	6 January 2020	24 January 2020
12	15	26 April 2021	14 May 2021
13	10	17 May 2021	4 June 2021
14	15	19 June 2023	21 July 2023
15	15	18 March 2024	5 April 2024
16	20	7 April 2025	2 May 2025

== Episodes ==
=== Series 1 (2010) ===
==== Liverpool to Scarborough ====
The first journey takes Portillo from coast to coast, from Liverpool to Scarborough, beginning on the world's first passenger railway line.

No.	Title	Original release date
1	"Liverpool to Eccles"	4 January 2010
On the first leg, Portillo learns to speak Scouse in Liverpool. He visits the scene of the Rainhill trials and finds out about the first railway fatality. Then, in Eccles, he explores the origins of the Eccles cake.
2	"Manchester to Bury"	5 January 2010
Portillo visits Manchester to find out more about George Bradshaw himself. He also gets fitted for a trilby in Denton and learns how the railways helped to create fish and chips.
3	"Todmorden to York"	6 January 2010
Portillo travels on the Embsay and Bolton Abbey Steam Railway, finds out about the latest Roman discoveries in York of the York Archaeological Trust and takes to the air in the Network Rail helicopter.
4	"Pontefract to Bridlington"	7 January 2010
Portillo searches for the last liquorice grower in Pontefract, discovers how the railways turned Hull into one of the largest white fish ports in the world and goes fishing for sea bass in Bridlington.
5	"Filey to Scarborough"	8 January 2010
Portillo goes birdwatching on the wild cliffs of Flamborough Head, learns to decipher traditional knitting patterns in Filey and meets one of the oldest residents of the Victorian seaside resort of Scarborough – a 4,000-year-old skeleton called Gristhorpe Man.

==== Preston to Kirkcaldy ====
Portillo's second journey, from Preston to Scotland, is on one of the first railways to cross the border.

No.	Title	Original release date
6	"Preston to Morecambe"	11 January 2010
Portillo explores the origins of the temperance movement in Preston, samples the attractions of Blackpool such as the Blackpool Tower where town crier and tower guide Barry McQueen sang the old music hall song "The Bradshaw Guide" to the accompaniment of the Wurlitzer organ played by Phil Kelsall in the Tower Ballroom. Blackpool was a resort made by the railways. Portillo takes a walk across Morecambe Bay with Cedric Robinson the official keeper of the sands.
7	"Settle to Garsdale"	12 January 2010
Portillo returns to the historic Settle-Carlisle line to find out what has happened to it since he helped save it in the 1980s. Along the way, he explores the Ribblehead Viaduct, finds out about the navvies who helped to build it and catches a steam train along the line.
8	"Windermere to Kendal"	13 January 2010
At Windermere, Portillo delves into the history of the railway station and takes a steamboat tour of the lake, then visits William Wordsworth's home village of Grasmere and makes sausages with a local Herdwick sheep farmer.
9	"Carlisle to Glasgow"	14 January 2010
Portillo meets the wild clansmen of Carlisle, the Border Reivers, witnesses a wedding in Gretna Green and visits a secret World War I munitions factory. He also meets comedian Janey Godley in Calton, Glasgow and Glasgow Green to discuss the contrasting poverty and grandeur of those respective places.
10	"Edinburgh to Kirkcaldy"	15 January 2010
Portillo makes apple juice in the Clyde Valley orchards, pays a thrilling visit to the top of the Forth Rail Bridge and relives his childhood memories in his grandparents' home town of Kirkcaldy.

==== Swindon to Penzance ====
The third journey takes Portillo along the Great Western Railway from Swindon to Penzance, nicknamed 'the holiday line'.

No.	Title	Original release date
11	"Swindon to Bristol"	18 January 2010
Portillo finds out about free holiday trains for the Great Western Railway workers at the Swindon Works, samples the Roman Baths in Bath and tries his hand at glass blowing in Bristol.
12	"Yatton to Weston-super-Mare"	19 January 2010
Portillo samples local Cheddar and strawberries, explores Cheddar Gorge and the famous caves, and visits Birnbeck Pier, one of the oldest piers in the country, at Weston-super-Mare.
13	"Torquay to Totnes"	20 January 2010
Portillo finds out about Torquay's micro-climate, takes a ride on a steam-hauled train to Dartmouth, goes salmon fishing on the Dart estuary and spends some of Totnes's local currency, the Totnes pound.
14	"Bugle to Mevagissey"	21 January 2010
Portillo wakes up in St Germans railway station and then visits English China Clays near St Austell. Travelling on to Mevagissey, he goes pilchard fishing, discovering that the pilchard was renamed as the Cornish sardine in the 1950s, and visits the Lost Gardens of Heligan on the Heligan estate.
15	"Truro to Penzance"	22 January 2010
Portillo searches for the lost church of Saint Piran, explores the last working tin mine in Cornwall at South Crofty, enjoys the sun and sands at St Ives, harvests oysters on the Helford River, and reaches the end of the line at Penzance.

==== Buxton to London ====
On this journey, Portillo travels from Buxton along one of the first railway routes south to the capital, London.

No.	Title	Original release date
16	"Buxton to Matlock"	25 January 2010
Portillo visits the Buxton Opera House and the Duke of Devonshire's stables in Buxton, helps to repair the ancient peat landscape of the Peak District, goes to Matlock Bath, and travels on a steam train on the heritage Peak Rail to Rowsley, where he visits the local stone quarry.
17	"Cromford to Burton upon Trent"	26 January 2010
Portillo visits the oldest working factory in the world at Cromford, explores the country's first public park in Derby and finds out why Burton's beer is said to be the best.
18	"Walsall to Bournville"	27 January 2010
Portillo meets the Queen's saddler in Walsall, visits the Balti Triangle, learns how to cook an authentic Indian curry at the Itihaas restaurant in Birmingham, and visits Bournville – the home of Cadbury and rumoured to be the best place to live in Britain.
19	"Coventry to Watford"	28 January 2010
Portillo finds out about the Coventry Blitz, meets the last farmer with pure-breed Aylesbury ducks in Buckinghamshire, and finds out how the trains helped to evacuate millions of children during World War II.
20	"St Pancras to Westminster"	29 January 2010
Portillo explores the former Midland Grand Hotel during the final stages of its redevelopment. He rides London Underground's first line – the Metropolitan line – to Smithfield Market Hall, and climbs the Clock Tower of the Houses of Parliament to hear the Big Ben bell chime.

=== Series 2 (2011) ===
==== Brighton to Cromer ====
The first journey takes Portillo coast-to-coast from Brighton to Cromer

No.	Title	Original release date
1	"Brighton to Crystal Palace"	3 January 2011
Portillo visits Brighton's Victorian aquarium – the largest in the world at the time – and explores the underground quarries of Godstone, before discovering the wonders of Crystal Palace in suburban south London.
2	"Waterloo to Canary Wharf"	4 January 2011
Portillo finds out about the Stiffs' Express, a funeral service running coffins from Waterloo to Brookwood Cemetery. He also discovers how London's West End became a great 19th-century shopping destination, and explores the changing fortunes of London's docks.
3	"Enfield to Cambridge"	5 January 2011
Portillo visits the government arms factory at Enfield (the largest machine shop in Europe in Bradshaw's day), discovers how the trains transformed Newmarket's races and finds out why Cambridge could be considered as the birthplace of modern football.
4	"Ely to King's Lynn"	6 January 2011
Portillo goes fishing with the last eel trapper on the Fens at Ely and visits one of the great triumphs of 19th-century engineering, the Denver Sluice. He ends this leg in King's Lynn, where he uncovers an ambitious plan to reclaim the Wash in Bradshaw's day.
5	"Dereham to Cromer"	7 January 2011
Portillo gets a rare chance to drive a heritage diesel train, finds out why Norfolk black turkeys appeared on the Christmas menu in Bradshaw's day, and samples some classic Cromer crab.

==== Ledbury to Holyhead ====
On this journey, Portillo follows the route of the Irish mail from Ledbury to Holyhead.

No.	Title	Original release date
6	"Ledbury to Shrewsbury"	10 January 2011
Portillo samples the Victorian drink perry (a kind of pear cider), gets up close and personal with a pedigree Hereford bull, and visits the grandfather of all skyscrapers – the world's first iron-framed building in Shrewsbury.
7	"Telford to Wrexham"	11 January 2011
Portillo visits the world's first iron bridge at Ironbridge, explores the historic Chirk Castle and has a go at making traditional Cheshire cheese.
8	"Chester to Conwy"	12 January 2011
Portillo takes a tour of Chester's Roman remains and discovers a secret World War II chemical weapons plant at Rhydymwyn. After spending the night in Llandudno, he goes mussel fishing on the beautiful Conwy estuary.
9	"Llanrwst to Porthmadog"	13 January 2011
Portillo explores the Conwy valley, stopping at Britain's first artists' colony at Betws-y-Coed, visiting the Victorian slate capital of Blaenau Ffestiniog and taking a steam train down to the harbour at Porthmadog.
10	"Llanberis to Holyhead"	14 January 2011
Portillo takes the train to the top of Wales's highest peak, Mount Snowdon, witnesses the revival of Anglesey's sea salt industry, and discovers how the railways transformed the tiny port of Holyhead.

==== Newcastle to Melton Mowbray ====
This journey follows some of the earliest railways in the country from Newcastle to Melton Mowbray.

No.	Title	Original release date
11	"Newcastle to Chester-le-Street"	17 January 2011
Portillo explores the first locomotive factory in the world, opened by George Stephenson. He also searches for the lost pit village of Marsden in South Shields and is entertained by a comic troupe of rapper sword dancers in Chester-le-Street.
12	"Durham to Grosmont"	18 January 2011
Portillo visits the historic Durham Cathedral, sees one of the first locomotives in Darlington and takes a Dracula tour in Whitby, before ending his journey on a North Yorkshire Moors Railway steam train across the North York Moors.
13	"York to Saltaire"	19 January 2011
Portillo takes a Victorian Turkish bath in the famous spa town of Harrogate, explores the exemplary Victorian village of Saltaire, and rubs noses with some friendly alpacas, whose fleeces made fortunes in Bradshaw's day.
14	"Batley to Sheffield"	20 January 2011
Portillo finds out about shoddy in the Heavy Woollen District, a successful 19th-century recycling industry in the textile town of Batley, discovers how the railways boosted Yorkshire's forced rhubarb trade, and meets the great-great-granddaughter of George Bradshaw himself.
15	"Langley Mill to Melton Mowbray"	21 January 2011
Portillo learns the secrets of stilton cheese, finds out how trains transformed the traditional British sport of fox hunting and attempts to make an authentic Melton Mowbray pork pie.

==== London Bridge to Hastings ====
This journey starts at London Bridge and goes through Kent and along its scenic coast to Hastings.

No.	Title	Original release date
16	"London Bridge to Chatham"	24 January 2011
Portillo visits the Royal Observatory, Greenwich to see how the railways standardised time, takes a walk through the Thames Tunnel, the world's first underwater tunnel, between Wapping and Rotherhithe and explores the historic dockyards at Chatham.
17	"Aylesford to Tunbridge Wells"	25 January 2011
Portillo explores the life of Victorian hop pickers, finds out about Maidstone's paper industry exemplified by James Whatman and discovers how the railways turned cricket into a national sport at Linden Park Cricket Club based at Higher Common Ground in Tunbridge Wells.
18	"Canterbury to Margate"	26 January 2011
Portillo finds out how Canterbury Cathedral was saved during the Baedeker raids of World War II, goes whelk fishing in Whitstable and explores the origins of a seaside swim in Margate.
19	"Sandwich to Folkestone"	27 January 2011
Portillo explores a secret port that ran the first train ferries to France carrying vital supplies during World War I, visits Walmer Castle, the home of the Duke of Wellington, and enters the Channel Tunnel.
20	"Hythe to Hastings"	28 January 2011
Portillo discovers a hardy breed of sheep on the atmospheric Romney Marsh. The majority of New Zealand's sheep are Romney Sheep. Then, he explores Kent's sparkling wine industry. Bradshaw's mentions grapes and wine, but there were none in Kent during his time. Only in the 1950s did a successful British wine industry emerge. Finally, he finds out why the Victorians went mad for ferns in Hastings.

==== Ayr to Skye ====
On this journey, Portillo journeys up the west coast of Scotland from Ayr to Skye.

No.	Title	Original release date
21	"Ayr to Paisley"	31 January 2011
Portillo visits Ayr, the hometown of Robert Burns, finds out how to make haggis, and recites Burns' Address to a Haggis. He then discovers how the railways transformed the game of golf at the Prestwick Golf Club and uncovers the story of the great Victorian tartan hoax in the Vestiarium Scoticum at Paisley.
22	"Dumbarton to Tyndrum"	1 February 2011
Portillo explores the historic Dumbarton shipyards that built the Cutty Sark, learns that the phrase 'Cutty Sark' is from the Tam o' Shanter poem, visits Queen Victoria's favourite Loch Lomond, and goes hunting for gold at Tyndrum.
23	"Oban to Corrour"	2 February 2011
Portillo discovers how trains spread the word about Oban whisky, hears about the heroic struggle to build a railway across the desolate Rannoch Moor and visits Corrour, one of the favourite shooting estates of the Victorian political elite.
24	"Roybridge to Glenfinnan"	3 February 2011
Portillo investigates one of the great geological mysteries of the 19th century – the parallel roads of Glenroy, finds out how the Victorians put a weather observatory on the top of Ben Nevis, and takes a steam train across one of the most spectacular viaducts in Britain at Glenfinnan.
25	"Lochailort to Skye"	4 February 2011
Portillo discovers how the railways helped train the first generation of commandos at Lochailort in World War II, finds out why langoustines have replaced herrings as the top catch in the fishing port of Mallaig and sails across the sea to Skye to explore the history of the highland crofters.

=== Series 3 (2012) ===
The third series featured four journeys in Great Britain, and a fifth journey which consisted of three legs in the Republic of Ireland and two in Northern Ireland: for this latter journey, the programme was re-titled as Great British Railway Journeys Goes To Ireland.

==== Great Yarmouth to Embankment ====
In these episodes, Portillo travels along the route of the Great Eastern Line, which goes from the east coast of England to the centre of the country's financial capital, London.

No.	Title	Original release date
1	"Great Yarmouth to Beccles"	2 January 2012
Portillo discovers the grave robbing history of Great Yarmouth, tries his hand at working a Victorian swing bridge in Reedham and takes to the air to discover how a Victorian railway guidebook helped aviators in World War II.
2	"Darsham to Felixstowe"	3 January 2012
Portillo learns about the Victorian fascination with Britain's own Atlantis to the lost city of Dunwich, meets some gentle giants who were crucial to the smooth running of the railways and discovers how the Port of Felixstowe grew into the biggest container port in the country.
3	"Sudbury to Southend"	4 January 2012
Portillo comes face-to-face with a medieval politician, takes a rail tour of Victorian freak show hotspots, and visits Southend to ride one of the world's first electric railways.
4	"Epping to Hackney"	5 January 2012
Portillo visits Essex to discover why dairy herds travelled there by rail from all over the country in the 19th century. He also visits Waltham Cross to see how the gunpowder made there fuelled the building of an empire and heads to Hackney to uncover the gruesome details of the first murder on a train.
5	"Fenchurch to Embankment"	6 January 2012
Portillo takes a ride on a secret miniature railway hidden beneath London's streets, rings the bells of Bow Church, and tries his hand at station announcing at Fenchurch Street station.

==== Windsor to Portland ====
Following in the footsteps of Queen Victoria, Portillo uses the railways she often rode from Windsor Castle to her country getaway on the Isle of Wight. His journey then continues west to Portland.

No.	Title	Original release date
6	"Windsor to Didcot"	9 January 2012
Portillo visits a station fit for royalty in Windsor, views the Maidenhead Railway Bridge an engineering triumph built by Isambard Kingdom Brunel to span the River Thames at Maidenhead, and tries his hand at collecting the mail 'Victorian style' on a steam-powered travelling post office.
7	"Reading to Alton"	10 January 2012
Portillo tastes a Victorian superfood in Alton, explores the fascinating Whitchurch silk mill, untouched for over 150 years, and tries his hand at driving a steam train on the challenging Watercress Line.
8	"Winchester to Isle of Wight"	11 January 2012
Portillo experiences the magnificent Victorian organ at Winchester Cathedral, goes behind the scenes at a 19th-century rail works still running in Eastleigh today and travels to Queen Victoria's favourite holiday destination, the Isle of Wight.
9	"Brockenhurst to Poole"	12 January 2012
On the trail of a Victorian snake catcher, Portillo visits the New Forest seeking out venomous adders, uncovers a secret library in Wimborne containing some very rare books and visits the Poole potteries founded in the 19th century, which are still working today.
10	"Wareham to Portland"	13 January 2012
Portillo uncovers the amazing oil fields hidden underneath England's quiet seaside resorts, discovers the crucial role Weymouth played in the D-day landings, and heads to the cradle of Victorian Britain's most prestigious building rock, Portland.

==== Oxford to Milford Haven ====
On this journey, Portillo travels west, from Oxford in the heart of England, through the Malvern Hills and into Wales, taking in the unique Victorian heritage of the South Wales coastline.

No.	Title	Original release date
11	"Oxford to Pershore"	16 January 2012
On the first leg, Portillo is led to a special view of the city of Oxford by his 19th-century guidebook, samples a Victorian navvies' brew made by steam power and discovers a unique and colourful crop in the heart of the Cotswolds.
12	"Hartlebury to Great Malvern"	17 January 2012
Portillo visits the home of Queen Victoria's favourite bishop in Hartlebury, sniffs out the secrets of a famous 19th-century sauce in Worcester and follows in the footsteps of Victorian health fanatics to the Malvern Hills.
13	"Lydney to Newport"	18 January 2012
Portillo discovers Britain's hidden micro-mines within the Forest of Dean, sees why the Victorians fell for the romantic ruins of Tintern Abbey and uncovers the railway engineering behind the industrial icon that is Newport Transporter Bridge.
14	"Cardiff to Brecon"	19 January 2012
Portillo discovers the Victorian coal heritage that turned Cardiff into the city it is today, explores the 19th-century reason why Barry Island isn't an island, and takes a steam ride through the beautiful Brecon Beacons National Park.
15	"Port Talbot to Milford Haven"	20 January 2012
Portillo explores the Victorian railway legacy behind the steel works of Port Talbot, follows the trail of 19th-century waterfall hunters in Neath and uncovers the fascinating whaling past of Milford Haven.

==== Berwick-Upon-Tweed to Snaefell ====
On this journey, Portillo takes in some of northern England's most dramatic scenery, from Berwick-upon-Tweed across the Pennines to the Lake District before completing the journey on the Isle of Man.

No.	Title	Original release date
16	"Berwick-upon-Tweed to Morpeth"	23 January 2012
Portillo discovers the unique cross-border history of Berwick-upon-Tweed, hears the unique story of the Pitman Painters of Ashington and sees first-hand the perils of working on the rails in Victorian times.
17	"Bardon Mill to Wigton"	24 January 2012
Portillo gets his hands dirty following the example of Victorian archaeologists at Hadrian's Wall, discovers how the invention of the ticket machine made a big difference to 19th-century rail users, and sees how the Victorian railways first fuelled invention in Wigton.
18	"Cockermouth to Eskdale"	25 January 2012
Portillo drinks a Victorian brew drawn from the pure waters of Cockermouth, steps inside the hidden world of nuclear reprocessing at Sellafield, and travels into the wonders of a Japanese-inspired 19th-century garden.
19	"Kirkby-in-Furness to Lancaster"	26 January 2012
Portillo learns about the secrets behind Kirkby's famous blue slate, submerges himself into a secret world of nuclear submarines in Barrow-in-Furness, and sees why the executions at Lancaster Castle drew the Victorians in their droves.
20	"Heysham to Snaefell"	27 January 2012
Portillo sets sail from Heysham to the Isle of Man, where he discovers the horse trams of Douglas, the 19th-century secrets of the giant Laxey Wheel, and the Victorian history of the delightful Snaefell Mountain Railway.

==== Goes to Ireland: Bray to Derry ====
On this (Note: For journeys in Northern Ireland and the Republic of Ireland, the programme was retitled Great British Railway Journeys Goes To Ireland.) journey, Portillo crosses the Irish Sea to discover the rich railway history of both the Republic of Ireland and Northern Ireland, following the unfurling 19th-century expansion of the tracks from Dublin to Derry.

No.	Title	Original release date
21	"Bray to Dublin"	30 January 2012
Portillo observes the amazing engineering feat involved in building the railway along Dublin's treacherous East coast, explores 19th-century crime and punishment in a Victorian jail, and finds out how the lions of Dublin Zoo changed the fortunes of the railways.
22	"Enfield to Drogheda"	31 January 2012
Portillo explores the extensive railway network within the Bog of Allen, discovers the Victorian secrets behind the amazing Boyne Viaduct, and travels underground into the vast Irish zinc mines.
23	"Dundalk to Portadown"	1 February 2012
Portillo learns of the Victorian fascination with antiquity by visiting the amazing Cromlech stones of Dundalk. He reaches for the stars at the Armagh Observatory and travels in style along the steam railway of Downpatrick.
24	"Belfast to Whitehead"	2 February 2012
Portillo explores the fascinating history of Belfast's Victorian docks, discovers the Irish spade-making traditions untouched for over 150 years, and takes a walk on the wild side with Whitehead's Victorian coastal paths.
25	"Ballymoney to Londonderry"	3 February 2012
Portillo takes a white-knuckle walk on the Carrick-a-Rede Rope Bridge, follows in the footsteps of the Victorians to experience the delights of the Giant's Causeway, and explores the rich history of Derry.

=== Series 4 (2013) ===
The fourth series followed the same format as the third, with four journeys in Great Britain and the last in Ireland, the latter using the same title card as in series 3.

==== High Wycombe to Aberystwyth ====
Portillo follows the tracks that fuelled the Industrial Revolution, from the Chilterns to west Wales.

No.	Title	Original release date
1	"High Wycombe to Stratford-upon-Avon"	7 January 2013
Portillo meets the remarkable craftsmen behind the Victorian furniture trade, discovers how George Bradshaw helped save Britain's canal heritage, and sees Shakespeare through the eyes of a 19th-century railway tourist.
2	"Birmingham to Stafford"	8 January 2013
Portillo travels to the manufacturing centres of the Midlands. He learns how the railways helped to make Birmingham the pen-making capital of the world, hears the chilling tale of one of 19th-century Britain's most notorious murderers and samples the delicacies concocted in a Victorian kitchen at Shugborough Hall.
3	"Stoke-on-Trent to Winsford"	9 January 2013
Portillo explores one of the greatest locomotive factories in railway history, discovers the dark side of the industrial revolution and learns how, in Victorian times, the potteries brought their products to the masses.
4	"Dudley to Bridgnorth"	10 January 2013
Portillo learns how Victorian blacksmithing was not for the faint-hearted, rides one of Britain's most modern trains and traverses the Victoria Bridge.
5	"Welshpool to Aberystwyth"	11 January 2013
Portillo travels to the Victorian seaside resort of Aberystwyth. He experiences Victorian entertainment, hears how the railways took Welsh textiles into even the most exclusive households and unleashes the power of a 19th-century engineering triumph.

==== Portsmouth to Grimsby ====
The second journey sees Portillo go from port to port: from Portsmouth on the south coast to Grimsby on the east coast.

No.	Title	Original release date
6	"Portsmouth to Gomshall"	14 January 2013
Portillo feeds the crew of Britain's newest warship, discovers how the Victorians planned to repel a possible French invasion, and learns that there is well-established industry where one might least expect to find it.
7	"Woking to Clapham Junction"	15 January 2013
Portillo gets close to some precious Victorian botany at Kew Gardens, tries his hand at croquet, and discovers a very surprising 19th-century place of worship.
8	"London Victoria to Abbey Wood"	16 January 2013
Portillo learns how volunteer Victorian fire fighters liked a tipple, discovers how even 19th-century sewage pumps were a celebration of design, and puts in a shift at the oldest fish market in Britain.
9	"London King's Cross to Peterborough"	17 January 2013
Portillo discovers how derelict Victorian London is being rejuvenated, puts in a shift at a Cambridgeshire brick factory, and meets the immigrant community built from its bricks.
10	"Spalding to Grimsby"	18 January 2013
Portillo sees how Lincolnshire farmers used rails to improve their harvests, visits Lincoln Cathedral, and looks to the future of rail freight.

==== Stirling to John o' Groats ====
On this journey, Portillo experiences the scenery of rural and coastal Scotland, travelling from Stirling, through the industrial east coast and Highland landscapes, to the western lochs, finally ending his journey in John o' Groats.

No.	Title	Original release date
11	"Stirling to Invergowrie"	21 January 2013
Portillo learns about a Scottish hero, visits a Highland Games and discovers how an impressive piece of Victorian engineering ended in tragedy.
12	"Dundee to Aberdeen"	22 January 2013
Portillo learns how Queen Victoria used to hide from her subjects, discovers how factory workers went deaf and goes out with a bang in Aberdeenshire.
13	"Dufftown to Aviemore"	23 January 2013
Portillo learns how Victorian whisky trains were raided by robbers, travels along one of Scotland's most impressive viaducts and discovers that life is not always sweet on a shortbread production line.
14	"Inverness to Plockton"	24 January 2013
Portillo rides one of Scotland's most picturesque railways, visits Scotland's smallest station and learns what went into a Victorian-style spa break.
15	"Invergordon to John o' Groats"	25 January 2013
Portillo learns how one man's vision helped bring train travel to the Highlands, discovers how farming has changed since Bradshaw's day and hears the remarkable tale of Scotland's Victorian gold rush.

==== London Paddington to Newton Abbot ====
The fourth part of the series sees Portillo follow in the footsteps of the master engineer of the Great Western Railway, Isambard Kingdom Brunel, beginning at the line's London gateway, Paddington station, and ending in Newton Abbot, Devon – the scene of one of Brunel's heroic failures.

No.	Title	Original release date
16	"London Paddington to Warminster"	28 January 2013
Portillo gets to grips with the old grey matter at a Victorian asylum, gives a historic horse a facelift and makes malt the 19th-century way.
17	"Salisbury to Castle Cary"	29 January 2013
Portillo visits a world-famous tourist hotspot that's been captivating visitors since the Victorian era, takes to the air in Yeovil and tries his hand at cloth-making the 19th-century way.
18	"Taunton to Minehead"	30 January 2013
Portillo explores a church that moves in mysterious ways, finds out just what it takes to run a 19th-century signal box and summons all his strength to move a one-hundred-and-ten-tonne steam locomotive.
19	"Lynton and Lynmouth to Exeter"	31 January 2013
Portillo gets up close to a piece of natural history, visits a garden that was used as a viewing platform for public hangings and experiences a timepiece like no other.
20	"Exmouth to Newton Abbot"	1 February 2013
Portillo takes to the sea with the heroes of the Royal National Lifeboat Institution, visits a stormy coastal railway, and has a close personal encounter with his boyhood hero.

==== Goes to Ireland: Killarney to Galway ====
All this week, Portillo visits the Republic of Ireland, travelling from the rugged beauty of County Kerry, across the rural Irish Midlands, to end in the city of Galway on the Atlantic coast.

No.	Title	Original release date
21	"Killarney to Cobh"	4 February 2013
Portillo samples 19th-century foodie delicacies, explores a stunning landscape shot to fame by rails and royals, and risks life and limb for the gift of the gab.
22	"Charleville to Waterford"	5 February 2013
Portillo learns the ancient art of butter making, attempts to learn the basics of Ireland's oldest game, and rides the Duke of Devonshire's Victorian Irish railway.
23	"Kilkenny to Athy"	6 February 2013
Portillo tries his hand at cutting marble Victorian style, uncovers 19th-century Ireland's surprising industrial heritage and learns how the railways helped bring motorsport to the masses.
24	"Newbridge to Roscrea"	7 February 2013
Portillo visits the Irish National Stud, discovers how harsh life was for the Irish poor and uncovers an astronomical feat of Victorian engineering.
25	"Athlone to Galway"	8 February 2013
On the final leg of his Irish journey, Portillo discovers historic jewellery with royal connections in Galway, meets a people's king and finds his voice with a traditional Irish singing group.

=== Series 5 (2014) ===
==== Manchester to Chesterfield ====
No.	Title	Original release date
1	"Manchester to Birkenhead"	6 January 2014
Portillo begins in Manchester, where he finds out how the world's first industrialised city produced a revolutionary political movement, and learns about the railway workers who founded one of the most successful football clubs of all time. Along the way, he does the washing in Port Sunlight—a model village on the Wirral—and hears stories about the aptly named George Francis Train's time in Birkenhead, Merseyside.
2	"Southport to Leyland"	7 January 2014
Portillo enjoys the fun of the fair beside the sea in Southport, explores the origins of business in Wigan and of the Industrial Revolution in Bolton, and then visits Leyland where he gets the chance to drive a 100-year-old vehicle.
3	"Preston to Rochdale"	8 January 2014
Portillo celebrates Victorian trade with the Preston Guild, and then heads to Rochdale to learn about a pioneering movement to improve the lives of working families. He also follows in the tracks of many 19th-century industrial employees who made day trips to Hebden Bridge to walk in the Calder Valley.
4	"Haworth to Huddersfield"	9 January 2014
Portillo crosses into West Yorkshire, visiting the Worth Valley and the home of the three Brontë sisters, who were early investors in the railway industry. He then heads to Oakworth to find out how its station and tracks were used in one of the most popular films ever made, and in Bradford he discovers the ways in which 19th-century workers saved to buy a home. He finishes in Halifax, where he learns how the railways contributed to the town's success.
5	"Honley to Chesterfield"	10 January 2014
Portillo tunes into the music of the mills and collieries of Victorian England by joining a brass band in Honley, before stopping off in Holmfirth to learn about a tragedy that led to a tourist boom in the town. He then crosses into Derbyshire to pay homage to railway engineer George Stephenson at his resting place in Chesterfield, before concluding his journey at Chatsworth House, one of the first stately homes to welcome visitors by rail.

==== London Euston to Leeds ====
No.	Title	Original release date
6	"London Euston to Cheddington"	13 January 2014
Portillo finds out what happened to the once proud Euston Arch and heads to Camden to see how goods were transported by rail, road and canal. He reflects on the Harrow and Wealdstone rail crash of 1952 and visits a country estate in Tring, Hertfordshire, before alighting at Cheddington in Buckinghamshire, which is close to the scene of 1963's Great Train Robbery.
7	"Bletchley to Newport Pagnell"	14 January 2014
Portillo travels through Buckinghamshire, meeting one of the Second World War's most secret agents at Station X in Bletchley. In Olney, he learns about a poet whose words are still sung today, and explores the first purpose-built railway town at Wolverton. His last stop is Newport Pagnell, where he tackles the ancient craft of vellum making.
8	"Northampton to Nuneaton"	15 January 2014
Portillo begins in Northampton, where Victorian methods have been used to make shoes for more than 130 years. He then heads to Warwickshire, learning about the legacy of Thomas Arnold at Rugby School and finding out how Coventry's craftsmen learned to adapt to survive, before ending this leg of his trip in Nuneaton.
9	"Leicester to Loughborough"	16 January 2014
Portillo sets off in Leicester, where he finds out about the hunt for Richard III's remains. He works his passage on the Great Central Railway from Rothley to Loughborough, where he learns about a family that has been casting bells in the town since 1839.
10	"Nottingham to Leeds"	17 January 2014
Portillo rediscovers a once-famous poet in Nottingham and travels on a railway line resurrected by popular demand after falling victim to the Beeching cuts. He finds out how Doncaster rail workers shaped British political history, before reaching his final destination of Leeds, where he auditions at Britain's oldest continuously working music hall.

==== Southampton to Wolverhampton ====
No.	Title	Original release date
11	"Southampton to Basingstoke"	20 January 2014
Portillo is taught to set tables aboard the luxury liner Queen Elizabeth, finds the remains of a military hospital built in the village of Netley by order of Queen Victoria, and learns about a battle in Basingstoke between townspeople and the Salvation Army.
12	"Winchfield to Crowthorne"	21 January 2014
Portillo travels through Hampshire and Berkshire, stopping-off at Stratfield Saye House, the stately home bequeathed by the nation to Arthur Wellesley, 1st Duke of Wellington, in 1817. He then heads to Aldershot Garrison, where he is put through his paces under military instruction. At St Michael's Abbey in Farnborough, he visits the tomb of French emperor Napoleon III and his family, and ends in Crowthorne, Berkshire, the home of Broadmoor Hospital.
13	"Wokingham to Bradford on Avon"	22 January 2014
Portillo begins in Wokingham where he finds out how demand from a growing number of rail commuters fuelled the development of the modern printing press. He then learns about a Tudor businessman who manufactured cloth in enormous volumes in Newbury, and ends this leg of his trip in Bradford on Avon where a local manufacturer describes how his Victorian forebears were the first in Britain to be licensed to vulcanise rubber.
14	"Chippenham to Gloucester"	23 January 2014
Portillo continues his journey in Chippenham, where at Lacock Abbey he discovers how the world's first photographic negative was made and learns how to make a print. He travels on to Bristol to visit the Victorian Clifton Zoo, where he learns that tigers and polar bears also arrived there by train. Next stop is Severn Tunnel Junction in Wales, where he explores an extraordinary piece of Victorian engineering with its own pump house pumping out millions of gallons a day to keep the Severn Tunnel dry. Finally, in Gloucester, he finds out why the station became infamous for lost luggage, and meets a stonemason who invites him to have a go at Gloucester Cathedral.
15	"Cheltenham to Wolverhampton"	24 January 2014
Portillo starts in the elegant spa town of Cheltenham, where he discovers a very early locomotive carriage which ran on the road and is allowed to get behind the wheel. Next stop is the medieval town of Tewkesbury, scene of a grisly battle during the Wars of the Roses, where he joins a group of re-enactors for a taste of the action. In Droitwich, he learns of the origins of the local salt industry, and then ends his journey in Wolverhampton, scene of Queen Victoria's first public appearance after the death of Prince Albert.

==== Norwich to Chichester ====
No.	Title	Original release date
16	"Norwich to Brandon"	27 January 2014
At Norwich Castle, Portillo uncovers the Victorian public's gory fascination with crime and punishment and finds out how campaigners such as Elizabeth Fry worked to improve conditions for prisoners. Heading west to Thetford, he explores how the Victorian appetite for rabbits and their fur led to special train services to London, and ends in the Suffolk town of Brandon, where he tries his hand at flint-knapping.
17	"Ipswich to Chelmsford"	28 January 2014
Portillo travels from Ipswich to Chelmsford, starting at an agricultural implements works with its own railway sidings. Continuing his journey south-west into Essex, he helps to dredge for oysters off Mersea Island before taking the train to Witham, where he discovers a model farming establishment at Tiptree. He ends this leg at Chelmsford, home to the world's first purpose-built radio equipment factory, established by Guglielmo Marconi.
18	"Ilford to Rochester"	29 January 2014
Portillo heads along the Essex bank of the River Thames before crossing the river into Kent. He begins in Barkingside, where Victorian philanthropist Thomas Barnardo made it his mission to transform the lives of destitute children, tries his hand at loading a container onto a pocket wagon at Tilbury Docks, and ends his trip in Rochester, where he encounters a host of familiar characters and explores a town that was an inspiration for many of Charles Dickens' works.
19	"Faversham to Dorking"	30 January 2014
Portillo starts in Faversham, where he visits the Shepherd Neame Brewery, one of the oldest in Britain. He then heads to Dover to explore a sunken fortress known as the Western Heights, before crossing into Surrey where he blow-dries a hen in Dorking.
20	"Brighton to Chichester"	31 January 2014
Portillo discovers the history behind the Brighton Pavilion and learns that Queen Victoria was not an admirer of the Prince Regent's flamboyant taste. He learns that while the railways brought day-trippers to frolic in fashionable Brighton, Victorian engineers built a magnificent underground network of sewers more than 40 miles long, which is still functioning today. At Bramber, he discovers that at the time of his guide tourists flocked to the town in huge numbers to see a Victorian museum of taxidermy. Portillo's next stop is Arundel Castle, and he's pleased to find that the Duke of Norfolk was a great supporter of the railways. His rail journey ends in Chichester, from where he heads up into the South Downs for a taste of life in the fast lane at the Goodwood Circuit.

=== Series 6 (2015) ===
==== Ayr to Edinburgh ====
No.	Title	Original release date
1	"Ayr to Stewarton"	5 January 2015
From Ayr, Portillo admires the granite island of Ailsa Craig before getting to grips with the ancient sport of curling, with help from a Scottish world champion. The Ancient Society of Kilwinning Archers invites him to take part in the oldest archery competition in the world. At Barassie, he rides the footplate of a freight train hauling coal on Scotland's oldest railway line. He caps off this leg of his journey in Stewarton.
2	"Greenock to Larkhall"	6 January 2015
Portillo begins in the industrial town of Greenock from where he sets sail on the PS Waverley, the last seagoing paddle steamer in the world. In Glasgow, he investigates 'Mackintosh style' in an iconic city tea room, before seeing the devastating effects of the 2014 fire at the Glasgow School of Art. In Blantyre, he discovers the humble beginnings of Britain's most famous missionary and explorer, and learns to bake sour dough in Scotland's oldest bakery in Strathaven.
3	"Motherwell to Linlithgow"	7 January 2015
Portillo celebrates Victorian iron and steel in Motherwell and admires one of its crowning achievements – the Forth Bridge. He journeys through picturesque countryside to admire the raw power of nature at the magnificent and romantic Clyde Falls, which inspired William Wordsworth and Samuel Taylor Coleridge, and where Victorian ladies swooned. In Cumbernauld, he learns of the birth of one of Scotland's best-selling soft drinks. In Linlithgow, he marvels at the ingenuity of the engineers who built the Union Canal and experiences a 21st-century technological refinement at Falkirk.
4	"Stirling to Pitlochry"	8 January 2015
Portillo begins this leg in Stirling, where he visits the scene of a bloody battle at Bannockburn. Following in the footsteps of Victorian holidaymakers, he travels north to Crieff to experience the popular Crieff Hydro. In the ancient capital of Scotland, Perth, he learns what it takes to make a sporran before catching the Highland Main Line to Pitlochry and one of Queen Victoria's favourite haunts. He finishes the day with a wee dram in Scotland's smallest distillery.
5	"St Andrews to Edinburgh"	9 January 2015
On the last leg, Portillo pays homage to the birthplace of golf at St Andrews. He visits a factory where they make traditional hickory-shafted clubs and ventures out on to the green. In Dunfermline, he discovers the poor beginnings of one of the world's wealthiest men, a remarkable philanthropist who worked on the railroads before making his fortune in steel. Crossing the Firth of Forth via the Forth Bridge, he arrives in Edinburgh in the middle of the world's largest arts festival, the Edinburgh Fringe Festival, where he treads the boards in an unconventional adaptation of a play by Oscar Wilde.

==== Amersham to London Bridge ====
No.	Title	Original release date
6	"Amersham to Regent's Park"	12 January 2015
Portillo travels on the capital's first underground railway, the Metropolitan line, from Amersham, where first he discovers the foundations for modern day suburbia. In Pinner, he finds out about a Victorian domestic goddess and whips up a pint of her fanciest ice cream. In Highgate, he investigates the terraced catacombs of one of London's vast 19th-century cemeteries. At Madame Tussauds he comes face to face with Isambard Kingdom Brunel before experiencing hot wax at first hand. He ends with a trip to the London Zoo at Regent's Park.
7	"Deptford to West Silvertown (Note: Silvertown was spelt incorrectly as 'Silverton' by many contemporaneous sources, including the BBC, Radio Times and IMDb.)"	13 January 2015
Portillo is invited aboard the construction locomotive for Crossrail to travel under the River Thames and to meet the impressive Mary, vital to the project. He then travels on the capital's first railway, and admires the remarkable brick viaduct on which it was built. He takes a tour underneath its arches with a Victorian map showing the poverty of those who once lived there. The Docklands Light Railway takes him to Greenwich, home to the Cutty Sark and in Woolwich, he discovers the firepower of the British Empire, before coming to a sticky end at West Silvertown.
8	"Stratford to London Victoria"	14 January 2015
Portillo takes the High Speed 1 line to Stratford to explore the legacy of the Olympic Park. He hears how an Indian lawyer, who learnt his trade in Victorian London, went on to change the world, and then explores an area of the city which has been home to wave upon wave of immigrants, Spitalfields. He ends this journey at Victoria tube station, where he finds out about the massive makeover currently under way.
9	"Covent Garden to Soho (West End of London)"	15 January 2015
Portillo explores London's theatreland and discovers how 19th-century engineering made for spectacular theatricals. At Charing Cross, he learns about the ambitious building programme which saw Trafalgar Square replace streets of slums, and comes almost face to face with George Bradshaw. At one of the busiest stops on the tube, Piccadilly Circus, he indulges in some retail therapy at a perfumery patronised by kings, queens and prime ministers. The Bakerloo to Oxford Circus line takes him to Soho and a grimmer side of Victorian London, where disease was rife.
10	"High Street Kensington to London Bridge"	16 January 2015
Portillo explores Albertopolis and reaches dizzying heights inside a Victorian landmark. He meets some of Battersea's most famous residents and gives one of them a bath! At Vauxhall, he learns about the darker side of London's flower market in Bradshaw's day. He ends this journey at London Bridge, where two stations are becoming one, and a new concourse is being built.

==== Derby to Lindisfarne ====
No.	Title	Original release date
11	"Derby to Grantham"	19 January 2015
Portillo gives an old engine a fresh start in the railway hub of Derby. In Nottingham, he discovers the Victorian origins of a well-known high-street chemist He then travels to Newstead Abbey, where he learns about its former owner, the young Lord Byron. A baking lesson in Grantham yields a batch of the oldest commercially traded biscuits in the country, and no visit to Grantham would be complete for him without calling at a historic grocer's shop.
12	"Boston to Hensall"	20 January 2015
Beginning in Boston in the flatlands of Lincolnshire, Portillo explores the connection between the city and its American namesake. At Southwell, he discovers the origins of the Bramley apple and learns how to make apple pie. In Menston, he visits an imposing institution built to provide asylum for those suffering from mental illness and learns how volunteers care for its once derelict chapel and graveyard. At Wakefield, he manages to board one of Britain's least frequent services and finds out what led to the birth of the parliamentary train. Along the way, he meets a former locomotive engineer who offers him the chance to drive a steam engine.
13	"Hessle to York"	21 January 2015
Portillo begins in Hessle, on the north bank of the River Humber, in the shadow of the Humber Bridge, where he learns about the technology that made it possible. In Kingston upon Hull, he meets his friend and sparring partner, local MP Alan Johnson, who tells him about another famous son of his city, William Wilberforce. In Scarborough, Portillo's Bradshaw directs him to the castle, where the founder of the Quaker movement was once imprisoned. His last stop of the day is York, where he learns what made the ancient capital a centre for the sweet-making industry.
14	"Middlesbrough to Hexham"	22 January 2015
Portillo starts in Middlesbrough, visiting one of the last iron foundries in the town and helping cast a carrot valve for a steam engine. His next stop is Darlington, where he meets the editor of the Northern Echo and finds out about the colourful history of WT Stead, one of his predecessors. He then heads to St Paul's monastery in Jarrow to learn about 8th century monk the Venerable Bede, known as 'the father of English history', before finishing in Hexham, where he visits a historic ginger beer emporium.
15	"Newcastle to Lindisfarne"	23 January 2015
Portillo sets off from Newcastle, finding out about the world's earliest swing bridge and its inventor William Armstrong. He then travels by boat from the port of Seahouses to examine the story of lighthouse keeper's daughter Grace Darling, who, along with her father, rescued nine people from tumultuous seas in 1838. On Lindisfarne, Portillo explores the lime kilns and finds out how Christianity spread from here across northern England in the 7th century.

==== Pembroke Dock to Cambridge ====
No.	Title	Original release date
16	"Pembroke Dock to Swansea"	26 January 2015
Portillo begins in Pembroke Dock, where Queen Victoria's royal yachts were built. In the little market town of Narberth, he investigates what caused rebels to dress up as women, and later spends the night at an inn in Carmarthen where Horatio Nelson once met Emma Hamilton. Then he pitches in with the volunteers who look after the Gwili Railway and ends this leg in Swansea, where he learns how to pose for a photograph in Victorian style.
17	"Swansea to Hereford"	27 January 2015
Portillo begins in the ruinous gardens at Aberglasney House near Llandeilo, and then rides in the driver's cab on the scenic Heart of Wales railway line. Crossing the border into England, he takes to the dance floor at the Lion Hotel Ballroom in Leominster, where a grand ball was held to celebrate the opening of the Ludlow to Hereford railway, and finishes at a traditional cider house in Hereford.
18	"Abergavenny to Hanborough"	28 January 2015
Portillo goes underground at Big Pit coal mine in Blaenavon, where he discovers how miners powered the Industrial Revolution. On the River Usk, he learns about 19th-century developments in angling, and then heads to Ascott-under-Wychwood, once the scene of a farm labourers' dispute that ended in rioting. He concludes at Blenheim Palace, the birthplace of Winston Churchill.
19	"Oxford to Luton"	29 January 2015
In the heart of academia in Oxford, Portillo visits the Bodleian Library and sees some Victorian treasures, including Mary Shelley's Frankenstein manuscript and a pocket-sized edition of Bradshaw's Companion. He then investigates two new railway projects at Bicester, finds out about Victorian philanthropy in Bedford, and finishes in Luton, where he learns about the arts of the hat-maker.
20	"Oakham to Cambridge"	30 January 2015
In Oakham in Rutland, Portillo learns about a tradition dating back to the Middle Ages and decides to take part. Heading east to Stamford, he discovers why the town is a popular location for period dramas, while a ghoulish scene greets him in Peterborough when he visits a Victorian operating theatre where railwaymen were treated. His last stop is Christ's College at Cambridge University, where he finds out about the student days of Charles Darwin.

=== Series 7 (2016) ===
==== Carlisle to Alton ====
No.	Title	Original release date
1	"Carlisle to Penrith"	4 January 2016
Portillo joins an assembly line in a Carlisle biscuit factory and discovers the popularity of the custard cream in Victorian times. He descends into Honister Slate Mine (now the only operational slate mine in England) and sees the miniature railway previously used to carry the slate to the surface. Portillo follows the route Victorian miners took to work, focusing on the tightrope bridge 300 feet (91 m) above the Borrowdale Valley which is now Britain's only Via Ferrata.
2	"Windermere to Carnforth"	5 January 2016
In the Lake District, Portillo explores the magical world of Beatrix Potter as author and illustrator of her well-loved stories and learns that she feared the encroachment of the railways. He visits the Brantwood home of the Victorian art critic and social thinker John Ruskin. Finally, at Carnforth he plays out a "Brief Encounter" .
3	"Preston to Swinton"	6 January 2016
In Preston, where four mill workers had been shot dead by soldiers during a protest in 1842, Portillo reads the Riot Act. In Darwen, he follows 19th-century developments in interior design from wallpaper to paint. He explores the Victorian industrial landscape of Salford depicted in L. S. Lowry's paintings – most recognisably with matchstick figures. He finishes on Kersal Moor, experiencing the tongue twisting Lancashire dialect and the poetry of Edwin Waugh.
4	"St Helens to Knutsford"	7 January 2016
In Merseyside, Portillo discovers how glass-making has developed, from the inventiveness of the Victorians who constructed Crystal Palace to the modern industry, seen in St Helens and elsewhere, which has inspired a modern revolution in architecture.
5	"Ashley to Alton"	8 January 2016
Portillo discovers how the new middle-class homes of Victorian Ashley had many chimneys which needed to be kept clean and were swept by young children, as depicted in Charles Kingsley's The Water-Babies. In Macclesfield, he finds the end of the Silk Route and tries screen printing. A steam-powered engine on the Churnet Valley Railway takes him to Froghall for Alton Towers where he learns about the 19th-century origins of this modern theme park.

==== Dover to Porthcurno ====
No.	Title	Original release date
6	"Dover to Lewes"	11 January 2016
Beginning in the Port of Dover, Portillo takes a plunge into the English Channel, inspired by the example of the first person to swim the Channel. A miniature steam train, one third the size of a conventional locomotive, conveys him from Romney Marsh to Dungeness. In Eastbourne, he learns how the 7th Duke of Devonshire managed to market the town's attractions to the refined upper-crust of Victorian London. Finally, Portillo attends the Glyndebourne opera festival on the South Downs.
7	"Newhaven to Worthing"	12 January 2016
In Newhaven, Portillo discovers a hidden Victorian fort, built to deter a French invasion. He then detours inland to see the Ouse Valley Viaduct and the Clayton Tunnel on the London-to-Brighton line. High on the South Downs, he learns how trains used to carry day-trippers up the climb to the Devil's Dyke, where flying kites was a popular past-time. At Worthing, he finds a railway which now helps to harvest tomatoes grown in a vast expanse of greenhouses.
8	"Littlehampton to Beaulieu"	13 January 2016
Portillo arrives in Littlehampton, where he discovers how Victorian engineers dug deep to defend the town's residents from cholera and learns how their drills still access clean water around the world. At Gosport, he experiences first-hand the lethal firepower unleashed on the French and learns how the Victorians were engaged in a furious arms race against them. At the family home of Florence Nightingale in the New Forest, he finds out what motivated the Lady of the Lamp, before seizing the chance to drive the first motor car at Beaulieu.
9	"Lymington Town to Exmouth"	14 January 2016
Portillo arrives in the sailing haven of Lymington where he makes a lifesaving discovery. Exploring Dorchester's literary landscape, he finds out how the coming of the railways inspired the work of the region's greatest writer – Thomas Hardy. Weaving his way to Axminster, he tries his hand at carpet-making. His last stop is Exmouth, home to Francis Danby, a forgotten Victorian landscape artist.
10	"Plymouth to Porthcurno"	15 January 2016
In Plymouth, Portillo finds out about the Royal Navy's fighting spirit and mixes his own blend of ruin. Crossing into Cornwall, he learns about the Royal Albert Bridge built by Isambard Kingdom Brunel. By Tre Pol and Pen, he comes to know Cornishmen and how to prepare the perfect pasty. His journey ends in a small village which in Victorian times became a hub of global communications.

==== Birmingham to Dartmoor ====
No.	Title	Original release date
11	"Birmingham to Worcester"	18 January 2016
Every train ride begins with a whistle and Portillo's journey this time starts in Birmingham's Jewellery Quarter to the sound of the Acme whistle, manufactured there since 1884. A visit to the city's town hall reveals a magnificent organ and the location for a celebrated music festival. Travelling south to Kidderminster, he visits the Royal Mail sorting office and finds out about the great postal innovator Sir Rowland Hill. Arriving in Worcester, he discovers the origins of the British Medical Association.
12	"Redditch to Gloucester"	19 January 2016
Portillo travels from Redditch to Gloucester, beginning with a look back to Victorian times at a needle manufactory. He also learns how to make Gloucester cheese, and joins the Gloucester Choral Society in a rendition of Jerusalem.
13	"Stroud to Bath"	20 January 2016
Portillo investigates the Victorian origins of snooker, before ploughing a crooked furrow at the Royal Agricultural College in Cirencester. In Bath, he takes tea with the ladies, and also discovers a scandalous novel written by an eccentric recluse, who was once the wealthiest man in England.
14	"Bristol to Glastonbury"	21 January 2016
Portillo enters the foul-smelling world of a Victorian tannery and hears how a 19th-century entrepreneur made his fortune thanks to mountains of bird droppings and then used his wealth to build churches and one of the most luxurious country houses in Britain. Portillo then heads for the mystical Glastonbury Abbey, where Victorian tourists flocked to hear tales of King Arthur and the Holy Grail.
15	"Bridgwater to Dartmoor"	22 January 2016
In Taunton, Somerset, Portillo stands trial at the Bloody Assizes and feels the full force of the law. He then gets to grips with a miracle of Victorian engineering on the Somerset Levels at Westonzoyland, and on Dartmoor embarks on a mid-19th century treasure hunt still popular today.

==== Ashford to Henley-on-Thames ====
No.	Title	Original release date
16	"Ashford to Sevenoaks"	25 January 2016
Portillo begins in Ashford, Kent, where he lends a hand at a state-of-the-art train maintenance plant which is home to High Speed 1 rolling stock. Then a visit to a factory, owned by make up brand Rimmel, gives insight into the Victorian cosmetics industry. This is followed by a stop off at Marden to visit a village to learn about the role played by the piano in the Victorian home and then helps to tune a piano, before ending his journey at Knole House in Sevenoaks, seat of the Sackville-West family.
17	"East Grinstead to Guildford"	26 January 2016
Portillo visits Leith Hill Place to explore the compositions of Ralph Vaughan Williams. He also dons a boiler suit and takes to the footplate of a locomotive on the Bluebell Railway, Britain's first passenger-carrying heritage line, and then witnesses the power of dynamite at first hand.
18	"Woking to Walton-on-Thames"	28 January 2016
Starting from Woking station, Portillo uncovers the story of Britain's first purpose-built crematorium. He then travels to West Byfleet, to visit the Royal Horticultural Society's Wisley Garden, followed by Brooklands, the birthplace of motor racing. From Walton-on-Thames, he goes camping and finds out about the unlikely origins of a leisure pursuit that is still going strong today.
19	"Hampton Court to Teddington"	29 January 2016
Portillo starts at Hampton Court Palace, where he is treated to a private tour of the Great Vine, the world's longest grapevine, before travelling to Esher Station to visit stately Claremont House, where tragic circumstances led directly to the birth of the Victorian era. He then travels to Wimbledon to see the site of a historic duelling event and ends his journey in Teddington, where he hears the story of John Langdon Down, the reformer, whose work revolutionised the care of those living with disabilities, including Down syndrome.
20	"Egham to Henley-on-Thames"	29 January 2016
Portillo begins in Egham, Surrey, where a historic steam fair offers the original "white-knuckle ride". Across town lies the Royal Holloway College, now part of the University of London, and it is here that Portillo discovers the institution's philanthropic roots. Then he travels to Staines-upon-Thames to see the stone which marked the historic boundary of the City of London. Next morning he takes the train to Windsor & Eton Riverside station and then walks to Windsor & Eton Central Station to catch the train for Slough in Berkshire, where he drops in at a factory manufacturing Horlicks, the sleep-inducing beverage. His journey ends at Henley-on-Thames in Oxfordshire, where he visits the River and Rowing Museum and later learns that rowing in an eight is a challenging business.

=== Series 8 (2017) ===
No.	Title	Original release date
London King's Cross to Edinburgh
1	"London King's Cross to York – The Flying Scotsman"	2 January 2017
Portillo travels from King's Cross to York on a special train pulled by the Flying Scotsman. Alan Pegler, who was involved in the restoration of the Flying Scotsman, is interviewed. Archive footage is shown of the restored locomotive being transported to the United States for a tour, along with film clips of this tour.
2	"Welwyn Garden City to Peterborough"	3 January 2017
Starting again from London, on a more leisurely journey, Portillo disembarks at Welwyn Garden City to visit Rothamsted Manor to learn about fertilisers. On the grounds of the manor is the Rothamsted Research facility, which he also visits. Next he travels to Hertford North to visit Haileybury College, home to an archive of Rudyard Kipling's writings. The next stop is Biggleswade, Bedfordshire for the Shuttleworth Swiss Garden at Old Warden. He concludes this episode with a return journey from Peterborough to Wansford station on the Nene Valley Railway.
3	"Newark-on-Trent to Stockton"	4 January 2017
From Newark Northgate, Portillo walks to the nearby St Mary Magdalene Church to learn about its song school and choir. Then he visits a gallery displaying railway posters. In Retford, at the Northern Rubber Factory, Portillo learns about Victorian rubber technology before travelling to Thirsk. He then goes just outside of Thirsk to visit the former home of Laurence Sterne, author of Tristram Shandy. While still in the area, he goes to a wildlife centre, and then on to Stockton-on-Tees where he goes to Preston Park Museum to learn about John Walker, inventor of the striking match.
4	"Darlington to Dunbar"	5 January 2017
In Newton Aycliffe, Portillo visits the Hitachi Newton Aycliffe train factory. He has to alight at Darlington to reach his next destination, Croft-on-Tees, where he learns about Charles Dodgson, aka Lewis Carroll, before visiting the nearby St Peter's Church. Next he travels to a smokehouse in Craster and learns how herrings are kippered; followed by a train journey to Dunbar to visit the birthplace of naturalist John Muir. Whilst still in the area, Portillo paddles a coracle on a river.
5	"Longniddry to Edinburgh"	6 January 2017
To reach his next destination, Haddington, Portillo has to alight at Longniddry station because the line to Haddington is now closed to passengers. Once there, he learns about locally born Samuel Smiles, who wrote Self-Help and then takes a ukulele lesson. In Musselburgh, he learns about life as a fishwife. Next, he explores Scotland's capital, Edinburgh; talking to passengers on a tram, driving a tram and visiting the Royal College of Surgeons to see the museum, where he learns about anatomy teaching, past and present. He sums up this episode from the Scott Monument, with Edinburgh Waverley station in the background.
Blackpool to Harwich
6	"Blackpool to Manchester Victoria"	9 January 2017
Portillo arrives at Blackpool Pleasure Beach via its own station. Inside the amusement park, on the narrow gauge Pleasure Beach Express, he learns of the history of the Pleasure Beach and rides on the Ghost Train. Then he takes the Blackpool Tramway to Fleetwood, where he learns of the origins of the Fisherman's Friend lozenge and is given a tour of the factory. Next he travels to Lostock near Bolton to visit a factory making a railway bridge and tries submerged arc welding. Continuing his journey, he goes to Salford Central to see the construction centre for the aforementioned bridge. He finishes at Manchester Piccadilly, where he gives a speech at the unveiling of a war memorial plaque. (Despite the title of this episode, Portillo does not end his journey at Manchester Victoria, but Manchester Piccadilly.)
7	"Manchester Piccadilly to Silkstone Common"	10 January 2017
Portillo starts off by taking a tram to Manchester Town Hall where Dr James Sumner tells him about John Dalton, the scientist who developed the periodic table and is shown a statue of Dalton, which is just inside the entrance. He then visits the National Graphene Institute before making the short train journey to Fairfield. Here he learns about Moravian immigration to Fairfield, Tameside. He starts the next day by travelling from Stalybridge Station to Marsden to visit the Standedge canal and rail tunnels and goes through the longest canal tunnel in Britain. Finally, he travels to Silkstone Common station near Barnsley to visit Wortley Top Forge and learn about Thomas Andrews (metallurgist).
8	"Chapeltown to Doncaster"	11 January 2017
Now in Yorkshire, Portillo's first stop is Chapeltown for Wharncliffe Crags, where he learns about rock climbing and then climbs a crag himself. The next stop is Sheffield, to see the University of Sheffield's collection of skeletons, and other specimens, housed in the Alfred Denny Building. Next he travels to Conisbrough, to see Conisbrough Castle, that was an inspiration to Sir Walter Scott when writing Ivanhoe and then journeys to Doncaster to visit Doncaster School for the Deaf.
9	"Gainsborough to Ely"	12 January 2017
Portillo stops at Gainsborough Lea Road to visit a wrapping and packaging factory. His next stop is Lincoln railway station to see a statue of Alfred Lord Tennyson, followed by a visit to the Tennyson Research Centre. He then travels to March station to see the Whitemoor marshalling yards. The last leg of this journey takes him to Ely station to visit Ely Cathedral where he learns about Sir George Gilbert Scott who rebuilt parts of the cathedral.
10	"Stowmarket to Harwich"	13 January 2017
From Stowmarket, Portillo travels to Brockford to visit the Mid-Suffolk Light Railway, and then continues to Saxmundham, where he leaves the rail network and proceeds east to Leiston for the Long Shop Museum. Returning to the rails, he travels to Ipswich, where he learns about the wet dock. Then he proceeds to Harwich Town, learning about the origins of travel to the continent, before back tracking to Harwich International, where he goes on to the bridge of a Stena Line ferry.
Goes to Ireland: Wexford to Westport
11	"Wexford to Wicklow"	16 January 2017
Portillo, wearing the colours of the Irish flag, starts this journey in the port of Wexford, visiting the Wexford Maritime Festival. Next, he rides in a 100-year-old lifeboat and learns about Irish-born John Barry, who became a hero of the United States Navy. Travelling to Arklow, County Wicklow, he visits the Meeting of the Waters at Avoca to learn about the Irish poet, Thomas Moore. His last stop is Wicklow station, and from there he travels to Poulaphouca Reservoir, where he learns about a 19th-century scheme to combat cholera in Dublin and concludes the episode travelling in a Victorian era horse-drawn, barrel-top caravan.
12	"Greystones to Dublin"	17 January 2017
In County Wicklow, Portillo alights at Greystones Station to visit the spectacular house and gardens of Powerscourt, including Powerscourt Waterfall. He then travels to Dublin's Connolly station and visits Trinity College where he views the Book of Kells, a 1,200-year-old illuminated manuscript Gospel book. While there, he visits the library and views Brian Boru's Harp. Next, he samples Guinness in a Dublin pub, before visiting St Patrick's Cathedral to learn how Victorian royals were sent to Ireland to help improve Anglo-Irish relations. He ends his Dublin tour in Phoenix Park where he learns about the Ordnance Survey's work in making maps of Ireland.
13	"Navan to Mullingar"	18 January 2017
Alighting at Navan Road Parkway, Portillo travels to Hill of Tara, County Meath where, during the Victorian Period, a dig failed to find the Ark of the Covenant. Then, in a nearby church, he looks at 3D modelling of the hill. From his next stop, Leixlip Confey, he visits a hydro-electric dam which has been adapted to help salmon pass through it. Stopping at Maynooth he visits St Patrick's Seminary and, while on the campus, he goes to its chapel, library and museum. His last stop is Mullingar station and from there he goes to meet members of a community marching band and plays Bass Drum in a march.
14	"Dromod to Sligo"	19 January 2017
Portillo stops at Dromod to visit the narrow gauge Cavan and Leitrim Railway, then learns how to make a pancake known as a boxty. Back on the main line, he alights at Sligo and goes to Carrowmore, to see one of the landscapes that inspired the poet, W. B. Yeats. He then visits the Michael Coleman Heritage Centre to learn about the cultural importance of both the Irish fiddle and traditional dancing (of which he partakes). He ends this episode by taking a boat trip on Lough Gill.
15	"Ballina to Westport"	20 January 2017
From Ballina Station, Portillo goes to Enniscrone to learn about traditional seaweed baths and then takes one at a bath house. The next stop is Foxford for Foxford Woolen Mills, where he learns about its founder, Mother Agnes. Westport is the last stop on this journey and from Westport station he travels to Clew Bay, where he has a meal of native clam. After a tour of the bay, he climbs part of Croagh Patrick and learns about its connection to St Patrick.

=== Series 9 (2018) ===
For the ninth series, which has an Edwardian theme, Portillo uses an early 20th-century edition of Bradshaw's Guide.

No.	Title	Original release date
Cromer to Brownsea Island
1	"Cromer to Cambridge"	1 January 2018
Starting from Cromer Station, Portillo walks to the beach, where he learns about the history of the resort. Next, he takes the train into the Norfolk Broads and stops at Wroxham, where, during a sail on a yacht, he learns about the Broads' history. Rejoining the train at Hoveton & Wroxham, his next stop is Norwich Station and he spends the night in Norwich at the Maids Head Hotel. Next day, back on the train, he travels to Attleborough to visit Quidenham Hall for clay pigeon shooting. His last stop is Cambridge, where he learns about the author E.M.Forster, who was an undergraduate at King's College, Cambridge.
2	"Letchworth Garden City to Herne Hill"	2 January 2018
Arriving at Letchworth, Portillo learns about Ebenezer Howard, the social reformer who conceived Garden Cities . He visits the museum that was once the architect's drawing office. Next he travels to London Kings Cross and then takes the underground to Green Park to visit The Ritz Hotel. Continuing on the underground, his next stop is Vauxhall, where he sees a tunnel boring machine extending the tunnel towards Battersea Power Station. He ends this day's journey by going to Brixton to visit Herne Hill Velodrome.
3	"Croydon to Shoreham-by-Sea"	3 January 2018
Arriving at West Croydon, Portillo goes to the Church of St Michael and All Angels and learns about the English composer Samuel Coleridge-Taylor. He travels on to Three Bridges to visit a Thames Link train depot. He next alights at Lewes to see Charleston, the home of artists Vanessa Bell and Duncan Grant, where he learns about the Bloomsbury Group. While changing trains at Brighton, he observes the cast iron and glass roof, and then continues to Shoreham-by-Sea, from where he visits Shoreham Airport and has a flight in a twin-engine aeroplane.
4	"Chichester to Cowes"	4 January 2018
Alighting at Chichester, Portillo visits Rolls-Royce's Goodwood factory, and then travels to Portsmouth & Southsea to visit the Kings Theatre, Southsea. His next journey is by hovercraft from Portsmouth to Ryde on the Isle of Wight, where he takes the train from the end of Ryde Pier to Smallbrook Junction to discover the Isle of Wight Steam Railway and travel on to Wooton, to visit Osborne House, the former holiday home of Queen Victoria and Prince Albert. Then at Cowes he rides on a power boat and visits the Royal Yacht Squadron.
5	"Swanwick to Brownsea Island"	5 January 2018
Alighting at Swanwick station, Portillo visits Warsash Maritime Academy. He travels on to Brockenhurst to see New Forest ponies and learn of the role they played in two wars. Next, he arrives at Bournemouth, overnights in Bournemouth's Langtry Manor Hotel and visits the beach to learn about the history of the beach hut. His last stop on this journey is Poole station to visit Brownsea Island, where Robert Baden Powell began the Scout Movement.
Whitland to The Lizard
6	"Whitland to Swansea"	8 January 2018
From Whitland station, Portillo travels to Pendine Sands to visit the Pendine Museum of Speed and drive a Morgan 3-Wheeler on the beach. At Llanelli station, he learns about a railway strike in Llanelli which ended in rioting and looting. Travelling to Gowerton station near Swansea, Portillo goes to Loughor to visit the birthplace of Evan Roberts, to learn of his history as an evangelist and a leading figure of the 1904–1905 Welsh revival. Alighting at Swansea station, Portillo visits the home of Welsh poet Dylan Thomas and then has a drink in the "No Sign Wine Bar", which Thomas frequented.
7	"Pontyclun to Ebbw Vale Town"	9 January 2018
Portillo alights at Pontyclun to visit the Royal Mint at Llantrisant, before travelling to the Welsh capital, Cardiff, for a visit to Cardiff Arms Park, where he learns about Welsh Rugby. Rejoining the railway at Queen Street, he goes on to Cardiff Bay to learn about the Bay's connection with the explorer Captain Scott . He then sails on a yacht that has been to Antarctica, before travelling to Ebbw Vale Town station. From there, Portillo rides on the Pontypool and Blaenavon Railway and learns about track inspection.
8	"Newport to Yatton"	10 January 2018
Portillo travels to the Welsh port city of Newport, where he discovers the city's rich maritime history and visits a loch where a disaster claimed 39 lives in 1909. He then goes to St Woolos Cemetery to see the Newport Docks Disaster Memorial. Returning to the train and alighting at Filton Abbey Wood, he visits Airbus' Landing Gear Test Facility. After overnighting in Bristol, Portillo arrives at Bath Spa, where he learns about the important part that the city of Bath played in the suffragette movement, before travelling to Yatton station for the Somerset seaside town of Clevedon, where he visits the Curzon Community Cinema, an Edwardian era cinema.
9	"Taunton to Newton Abbot"	11 January 2018
Alighting at Taunton, Portillo visits the Grade II* listed building, Hestercombe House, to see its Edwardian garden, which was laid out by Gertrude Jekyll. He then travels along the West Somerset Railway from Bishops Lydeard to Stogumber to visit Halsway Manor, home to the National Centre of Folk Arts. Returning to the main line, his next stop is Exeter St Davids and, after visiting Exeter Cathedral where he participates in bell ringing, he travels to Newton Abbot to visit Bovey Castle on Dartmoor National Park.
10	"Plymouth to The Lizard"	12 January 2018
Alighting at Devonport, Portillo visits Plymouth to learn of its long maritime history and, in the Duke of Cornwall Hotel, he hears how some of the survivors of the Titanic sinking were subsequently confined there. Travelling onwards to the harbour town of Fowey, he learns about the poet Arthur Quiller-Couch. Passing St Michael's Mount, Portillo alights at Penzance and makes his way to the fishing port of Newlyn, where he visits a coppersmith's workshop, which opened in 1890 to help give fishermen new skills. He ends his journey in Poldhu, on The Lizard peninsula, where he discovers how Marconi sent the world's first radio transmission across the Atlantic ocean and, at Goonhilly Satellite Earth Station, Portillo sends a radio signal to the moon and back.
Kingston upon Hull to Caernarfon
11	"Kingston upon Hull to Malton, North Yorkshire"	15 January 2018
Portillo travels to the port city of Kingston upon Hull and sees wind turbine blades being made at a site on the Alexandra Dock. He then makes the short journey from Paragon Interchange to Cottingham station to visit Tranby Croft – location of the late 19th century Royal baccarat scandal. Next, he visits the seaside town of Scarborough, where he learns about the 1914 bombardment of the town by the German Navy. Then, travelling away from the coast, he alights at Malton to visit Castle Howard where he learns about the "Fearless Champion of Causes", Rosalind Howard.
12	"York to Frizinghall"	16 January 2018
Portillo travels to York to look into the city's long history of chocolate making. At the University of York's Borthwick Institute he learns about the social reformer, Seebohm Rowntree. Then, travelling westwards, he alights at Harrogate station to have tea in Bettys Cafe Tearoom. His next stop is Leeds station, from where he visits tailor Berwin & Berwin's distribution centre. Then, taking the train to Frizinghall, he goes to Bradford Grammar School and learns about one of its famous students – composer, Frederick Delius.
13	"Sheffield to Nantwich"	17 January 2018
Portillo visits Sheffield's Kelham Island Museum to see the River Don Engine and learn more about the city's industrial heritage. Then he goes to Sheffield Forgemasters to see steel being worked. Returning to the station, he continues to Langley Mill, where he alights and travels to Eastwood, birthplace of the writer D. H. Lawrence. After visiting the Raleigh Bicycle Company headquarters, Portillo travels from Derby Midland Station to Crewe where he changes trains to reach Nantwich. There, he walks around the market town, which was once one of the biggest salt producers in England and finishes with a swim in the Nantwich Brine Pool.
14	"Liverpool to Dolgarrog"	18 January 2018
Portillo alights at Liverpool Central, to visit the city's Anglican Cathedral and learn about its designer, Giles Gilbert Scott. Later, he visits the Merseyside town of Maghull, home of Frank Hornby, inventor of Meccano and Hornby Railways. Alighting at Abergele & Pensarn railway station in North Wales, Portillo delves into the past of nearby Gwrych Castle by talking to Mark Baker, founder of its Preservation Trust. In the Welsh village of Dolgarrog, he learns about its history with Aluminium smelting and then takes a surfing lesson at an artificial wave pool, which was opened on the site of the former aluminium works.
15	"Criccieth to Caernarfon"	19 January 2018
Portillo alights at Betws-y-Coed, the gateway to Snowdonia, later he rides the Ffestiniog Heritage Railway to Minffordd and then onto Criccieth to visit Llanystumdwy, home town of David Lloyd George – to date the only Welsh-born British Prime Minister. Here he visits the Lloyd George Museum and the house that Lloyd George grew up in. Portillo travels to Penrhyn Slate quarry, once one of the biggest of its kind in the world. After travelling along the Welsh Highland Railway, he ends his journey in Caernarfon and its famous castle.

=== Series 10 (2019) ===
No.	Title	Original release date
Warrington to Stoke-on-Trent
1	"Warrington to Preston"	4 February 2019
Alighting at Warrington Bank Quay, Portillo goes to Warrington Museum & Art Gallery to learn about a visit by George V, which took place in 1913. Then he travels to Huyton to visit Knowsley Hall, where he sees the archival remnants of this royal visit. Next he travels to Leyland and visits Hutton & Howick Women's Institute to learn about Edith Rigby, the suffragette who was its first secretary. The next stop is Preston to visit Deepdale, where he learns about the Dick, Kerr Ladies F.C.
2	"Blackburn to Manchester"	5 February 2019
From Blackburn Station, Portillo visits the Empire Theatre to view some recently discovered films, which date from the late 19th and early 20th centuries. Continuing his journey to Nelson Interchange, he goes to Pendle Hill, above Nelson, Lancashire, to visit a working class club that is described as "the last Clarion House in England". He travels on to Manchester Victoria, and at Manchester Art Gallery he learns about the vandalising of paintings by three suffragettes, in response to the imprisonment of Emmeline Pankhurst; he then visits the Pankhurst Centre.
3	"Manchester to Elsecar"	6 February 2019
Portillo alights from the Manchester Metrolink at Heaton Park and learns about a series of gramophone concerts that were held in the park from 1909 onwards. Continuing to Oldham, he hears how Winston Churchill became Member of Parliament for the town in 1900. He then travels from Manchester Piccadilly to Edale for a ramble through the Peak District, where he learns about the Clarion Ramblers, who campaigned for the right of access to open moorland. Next, he travels to Elsecar to visit the Wentworth Woodhouse Estate and learn about the royal visit of 1912, before going to Elsecar Heritage Centre. Returning to the station, he is invited to take the controls of a steam engine on the Elsecar Heritage Railway.
4	"Maltby to Hinckley"	7 February 2019
Starting from Rotherham Central, Portillo travels to Maltby to investigate whippet racing. Then he takes the train from Sheffield to Derby to visit Kedleston Hall, where he examines the interiors, which were created by Robert Adam. Returning to the railway, his next stop is Burton on Trent, where he learns about the yeast extract spread, Marmite. He continues on to Hinckley, where he rides as a pillion passenger on a Triumph motorcycle. He then goes inside a Triumph factory and, after seeing the production line, he visits a Triumph Heritage Centre.
5	"Birmingham to the Potteries"	8 February 2019
Portillo travels to Selly Oak to visit Highbury Hall, the former home of Joseph Chamberlain who, after transforming the City of Birmingham, joined Gladstone's government. Next, from Birmingham Moor Street, he travels to Cradley Heath to visit the Mushroom Green Chain Shop, where, he learns about a successful strike by women chain makers, and then goes to see a monument to their leader, Mary Macarthur. At Great Wyrley in Staffordshire, Portillo hears the story of George Edalji who suffered a miscarriage of justice, the consequence of which was the establishment of the Criminal Court of Appeal in 1907. The final leg of this journey takes him to Stoke-on-Trent station and a trip to the "World of Wedgwood" museum, where he is shown photographs of a 1913 Royal visit.
Newry to Argyll and Bute
6	"Newry to Portadown"	11 February 2019
Alighting at Newry station, Portillo finds out about Newry's role in the Irish Home Rule movement from local historian Hugh McShane. Then he travels to Scarva, County Down to visit the Thomas Ferguson Irish Linen factory in Banbridge. Next, he visits Short Brothers, the world's first aircraft manufacturers and, at the Ulster Aviation Society, he sees a replica of a Ferguson Flyer monoplane. Returning to the railway, he goes to Portadown to visit Irwin's Bakery, where he is shown how to make soda bread. Then he has a horse-drawn carriage ride from Glaslough to Castle Leslie, where he is shown Winston Churchill memorabilia.
7	"Belfast to Portrush Town"	12 February 2019
Portillo starts at Belfast City Hall where, in 1912, the Ulster Covenant was signed in protest against home rule for Ireland, and he sees the historic document in the Public Records Office of Northern Ireland. Next, he visits C.S. Lewis Square, named in honour of the author, C.S. Lewis, followed by Campbell College, where Lewis was a pupil, and then St Mark's Church, Dundela, which had connections with Lewis's family. Portillo ends the day at the Titanic Hotel. Next day, he alights at Antrim station for Lough Neagh, to see the largest wild eel fishery in Europe and has a meal of eels. His final stop of the day is Portrush, to visit the Royal Portrush Golf Club, where he is given a golf lesson.
8	"Larne to Dumfries"	13 February 2019
Portillo arrives at Larne Harbour station and takes the ferry to Stranraer, where he listens to a bagpipe band. He then goes along the Mull of Galloway to a lighthouse built by Robert Stephenson, where he sees a recently restored foghorn. Next, he travels to Cumnock to visit the Baird Institute where, in the Keir Hardie Room, he learns about Keir Hardie, the founder of the Labour Party. The last stop is Dumfries, where he visits Moat Brae Garden to learn about J.M. Barrie, the author of Peter Pan.
9	"Glasgow to Cumbrae"	14 February 2019
From Glasgow Central station, Portillo walks through the centre of Glasgow, before visiting the Riverside Museum to learn about the Glasgow Subway. He then travels to Govan, where he sees maintenance work being carried out on subway cars at the Broomloan Depot. On the Clyde waterfront, he learns about the history of shipbuilding in Glasgow. This is followed by a visit to BAE Systems, who supply ships for the Royal Navy. Then he visits the Tenement House Museum to hear how Mary Barbour led a successful campaign to resist rent rises. Returning to the railway, he heads west to the Firth of Clyde, alighting at Largs. After taking the ferry to Cumbrae, he learns about the Antarctic voyage of William Speirs Bruce and examines inter-tidal marine life on the shoreline.
10	"Glasgow to Connel Ferry"	15 February 2019
Portillo starts with a visit to Glasgow University to investigate the Officer Training Corps. Then, from Queen Street Station, he travels west along the shores of the Clyde to Helensburgh, where he views pictures painted by the Glasgow Boys. Next, he goes to the Long Croft, a house which represents the interests of the family who lived there, including architecture, embroidery and painting. Rejoining the railway at Arrochar and Tarbet, he travels north to visit Inveraray Castle, where he learns about Princess Louise, Duchess of Argyll. His last stop is Connel Ferry, where he enquires into the origin of Highland Cattle.
Warwick to Rye
11	"Warwick to Radley"	18 February 2019
Portillo alights at Warwick to visit Warwick Castle, where he hears about Daisy Greville, who was Countess of Warwick during the Edwardian Era. Next, he takes the train to Oxford, to visit the Asmolean Museum, where he sees some of the medieval artifacts which inspired Lawrence of Arabia to take up archaeology. Then, he takes a ride in a 1960 Mini to visit the Mini factory in Cowley, where he is given a tour of the assembly lines and rides in a new Mini as it is driven onto a delivery train. His next stop is Radley and from there he goes to Radley College to hear a performance of one of George Butterworth's compositions.
12	"Reading to Taplow"	19 February 2019
Portillo visits Reading University to learn about the Workers Educational Association. Then he travels to Twyford, where he changes to the branch line for Henley-on-Thames. There he takes a boat ride on the river and then learns some of the background behind Kenneth Grahame's novel, The Wind in the Willows. Next, he travels by rail to Cookham, where he visits the Stanley Spencer Gallery. Then he goes to Cliveden, an Italianate country house, to learn about one of its former residents, Mary Astor, who became the first female Member of Parliament in Britain.
13	"Ealing Broadway to South Kensington"	20 February 2019
Portillo alights at Ealing Broadway to visit Ealing Studios, where he learns about its founder, Will Barker and a film make-up artist applies makeup to Portillo. From Putney Bridge, he goes to Fulham to see the building site of a new "super sewer" and is shown a tunnel boring machine. At the London School of Economics, he discusses the ideals of the Fabian Society with a group of students. His last stop is South Kensington for a visit to the Budokwai, where he learns about Japanese Martial Arts and takes to the mat for instruction on a Judo move.
14	"Piccadilly Circus to Gravesend"	21 February 2019
In London, at Liberty's Department Store, Portillo learns about Arthur Liberty, its founder. In Covent Garden, he goes to the Royal Ballet School, followed by a walk across the Bridge of Aspiration for a drink in the bar of the Royal Opera House. He then boards a train at Charing Cross railway station, alighting at Dartford to visit North Kent College, where he learns about Martina Bergman-Österberg, the inventor of netball. His next stop is Gravesend, where he visits the Royal Terrace Pier, which is owned by the Port of London Authority, followed by a ride on a pilot vessel working on the Thames.
15	"East Malling to Rye"	22 February 2019
Portillo alights at East Malling, home to the NIAB Centre for Fruit Research, where he learns of the importance of root stock in the cultivation of apples. He travels on to Folkestone Central to learn how Britain became a safe haven for Belgian refugees in 1914; at Folkestone Museum, he sees a painting by Fredo Franzoni with the title "Landing of the Belgian Refugees". He then goes to see the recently restored Folkestone Harbour station. Next, he visits Tenterden Town station and its restoration shed, followed by a ride on the Kent and East Sussex Railway to Bodiam. He ends this journey by travelling to Rye, where he visits Lamb House, the former home of author Henry James, and dines on scallops at a restaurant in the town. Portillo sums up this series of journeys by saying that the Edwardian Era "was a time of important change".

=== Series 11 (2020) ===
No.	Title	Original release date
Newcastle to Loch Ness
1	"Newcastle to County Durham"	6 January 2020
After crossing the River Tyne, Portillo alights at Newcastle Central and takes the Metro to Jarrow to learn about the Jarrow Crusade. Back in Newcastle, he looks at the Tyne bridges and some modern architecture on the quayside. He travels to Byker for an outing to Newcastle Greyhound Stadium, and then returns to Newcastle to overnight at the Royal Station Hotel. Next morning, he travels to Durham to see Durham Cathedral and then goes to a coal-fired fish & chip shop. At Spennymoor, he meets the son of the former artist, Norman Cornish, in his father's studio.
2	"Kielder Forest to Edinburgh"	7 January 2020
Portillo alights at Stocksfield, to visit the Northumberland County Show; at the Forestry Commission stall, he learns about the Commission's history, before exploring nearby Kielder Forest. Then he visits Lovat Mill in Hawick, now the last operating weaving mill in the area. In Galashiels, he overnights in the Kingsknowes Hotel, which belonged to local textile mill owner, Adam Lees Cochrane. In the morning, he rides on the reinstated Borders Railway to Edinburgh Waverley, where he climbs Calton Hill and visits the Scottish Parliament Building. Then, at the Dominion Cinema, he learns about a pioneer of documentary making, John Grierson.
3	"Falkirk to Dundee"	8 January 2020
Portillo alights at Falkirk Grahamston and goes to the Westerglen transmitting station, where he learns how the BBC was able to reach more Scottish listeners in the 1930s. Next, he sees The Kelpies, a 30 metre high equine sculpture. Arriving at Gleneagles Station, he is chauffeur driven to the Gleneagles Hotel, ending the day with a cocktail in The American Bar. In the morning, he continues to Dunkeld & Birnam to visit Blairgowrie, where the Scottish raspberry industry was born. The last leg of this journey takes him to Dundee, where he notices the unusual architecture of the Victoria and Albert Museum. Lastly, he visits DC Thomson's headquarters, the home of The Dandy and Beano comics.
4	"Dundee to Aberdeen"	9 January 2020
Portillo starts with a visit to Glamis Castle, where Queen Elizabeth The Queen Mother grew up. Continuing his journey, he alights at Montrose for a walk on the moors, and visits a bothy, which provides free shelter and accommodation for ramblers. His next stop is Aberdeen, where he visits the Rowett Institute of the University of Aberdeen, learning of the studies by John Boyd Orr which helped improve diet and tasting some of the food developed by the students. He then walks along the Aberdeen seafront to the art deco Beach Ballroom, where he hears about its history and is given a dancing lesson.
5	"Elgin to Loch Ness"	10 January 2020
Portillo alights at Elgin station and travels to Lossiemouth to visit the MacDonald family home and learn about Ramsay MacDonald, the first Labour Prime Minister, from his granddaughter, Iona. He then goes to Gordonstoun School, where he learns about its founder Kurt Hahn and sees the school's own fire station. Next, he goes to Inverness Museum and Art Gallery to look at an archive of photographer M.E.M.Donaldson's work. Then he sails on the Deepscan Research boat on Loch Ness.
St. Ives to Salisbury Plain
6	"St Ives to St Day"	13 January 2020
At the end of the branch line to St Ives, Portillo investigates the town's artistic community, including the legacy of fisherman-turned-artist, Alfred Wallis; in the Tate Gallery, St Ives, Portillo sees some of Wallis's paintings, and in the Leach Pottery studio, he learns about its founder, Bernard Leach. Rejoining the main line at St Erth, he changes trains to reach Hayle station, where he learns about railway carriages that have been converted into holiday homes and has a look around one such "camping coach" berthed next to the station. His next stop is Redruth, where he sees a statue of a tin miner and explains its significance. In nearby St Day, he hears about philanthropist William John Mills, who bought twenty-eight houses and offered them for use by the poor; in Mills Street, Portillo sees these houses and then joins in with the St Day Feast festivities.
7	"Truro to St Mawgan"	14 January 2020
Portillo arrives at Truro to visit the cathedral. He then goes to see the gardens at Trewithen House, where he explains how plant hunters brought back plants from Asia. He changes trains at Par to travel the branch line to the coast at Newquay, where he visits Fistral Beach; there, he listens to a history of British surfing, examines various surfboards, and makes an attempt at surfing. At nearby St Mawgan, he learns about Cornish wrestling and participates in a friendly bout, and then visits Newquay Airport to learn about the history of flight in Cornwall.
8	"Bodmin to Totnes"	15 January 2020
Portillo alights at Bodmin Parkway, and travels north-east to visit Jamaica Inn, made famous by a Daphne du Maurier novel. His next stop is Plymouth to visit Plymouth Hoe, followed by a swim at Tinside Lido. Returning to the railway, he travels to Ivybridge and then to the south coast, where he rides on a sea tractor to reach Burgh Island and visit its art deco style hotel. His last stop is Totnes, to visit Dartington Hall and learn how it became important to the Modern Dance Movement.
9	"Paignton to Tiverton"	16 January 2020
At Paignton station, Portillo meets a great-grandson of Agatha Christie and, after a short ride on the Dartmouth Steam Railway, they visit Greenway, which was once Christie's home. Back on the main line, he travels to Dawlish to visit Whetman Plants International, where he is shown new breeds of plants being developed. Continuing to Exeter St Davids, he learns about Allen Lane, the publisher who founded Penguin Books. He next alights at Tiverton Parkway to visit Culm Valley, where he hears about the origins of the Young Farmer's Clubs.
10	"Taunton to Salisbury Plain"	17 January 2020
Portillo alights at Taunton and travels to the Somerset Levels, where he visits Coates English Willow. Here he sees Willow being cultivated and machine processed. His next stop is Castle Cary, where he visits YHA Street, the oldest established Youth Hostel in Britain. Next he travels to Bath Spa, to see Fairfield House and find out why the Emperor of Ethiopia, Haile Selassie, lived in Bath during his exile. He then learns how Selassie came to be regarded as a deity by Rastafarians. His last stop on this journey is Salisbury to visit Tidworth Camp, where he sees a Challenger 2 Street Fighter tank in action.
Canterbury to Skegness
11	"Canterbury to Alexandra Palace"	20 January 2020
Portillo arrives at Canterbury West Station on a High Speed Javelin Train to visit Canterbury Cathedral and learn how T.S. Elliot's play, Murder in the Cathedral, came to be performed there. Continuing through Kent, he alights at Maidstone East to visit the Royal British Legion Village. Here he learns how the Royal British Legion was formed and visits a factory making Remembrance Day poppies. The next stop is Sevenoaks to visit Chartwell, the home of Winston Churchill. On the next leg of this journey, he has to change trains at London Bridge, where he views the recent £1bn transformation of the station, before taking the Thames Link to Alexandra Palace. At the palace, he sees where the BBC first broadcast television pictures from.
12	"Limehouse to Rochford"	21 January 2020
Continuing in London, Portillo alights at Limehouse, where he visits the site of the Battle of Cable Street and sees the Cable Street Mural. Next, he visits the Ford factory at Dagenham, where he is shown around the plant, before driving a 1931 Ford Model AA pickup truck. Returning to the railway, he next alights at Southend Central, to visit Rossi's ice cream parlour on the Southend Esplanade. Then he travels to Rochford to see the RSPB bird reserve on Wallasea Island.
13	"Witham to Felixstowe"	22 January 2020
Portillo alights at Witham to visit Crittall Windows, a manufacturer of metal framed windows, and sees Silver End , a model village built for the employees of Crittall Windows. Next, he travels to Ipswich Station to visit Wherstead Park, where he meets a former refugee from the Spanish Civil War who had met Portillo's parents. Then he goes just outside of Ipswich, to Newbourne, to understand how the Land Settlement Association provided new opportunities, in horticulture, for unemployed people. Then, taking the ferry across the River Deben, he visits Bawdsey Manor where he learns how Radar was developed on this site during the Second World War.
14	"Saxmundham to Norwich"	23 January 2020
Portillo alights at Saxmundham for Snape Maltings which is now an international arts and music complex. Here he learns about the composer, Benjamin Britten and listens to a performance of one of his piano compositions. Next, he visits Great Yarmouth to see the town's Venetian Waterways. Here he talks to volunteer gardeners, before rowing a boat on the lake. Then he takes a train from Great Yarmouth Station to Norwich where he walks around the city. At Norwich City Hall, he is shown around by the Lord Mayor of Norwich and then visits Norwich Market.
15	"Attleborough to Skegness"	24 January 2020
Portillo arrives at Attleborough and investigates the origins of the charity, World Horse Welfare. Next, he travels to Peterborough to see the curiously-named Dog-in-a-Doublet lock on the River Nene. He continues to Skegness, where he visits a Butlins holiday camp. To end this journey, he travels inland to RAF Coningsby, home to the Battle of Britain Memorial Flight which maintains heritage aircraft in airworthy condition, and goes inside a Lancaster Bomber and watches a Eurofighter Typhoon take off.

=== Series 12 (2021) ===
No.	Title	Original release date
Oxford to Winchester
1	"Oxford to Abingdon"	26 April 2021
Armed with a 1936 copy of Bradshaw's Railway Guide, Portillo arrives at Oxford, where he learns about the important contribution that the University's female students have made. After hearing of Oxford's influence on fashion, he goes to Walters of Oxford to buy a pair of Oxford Bags, and overnights in the Randolph Hotel. In the morning, he visits the 17th century country house Garsington Manor, where he learns about Lady Ottoline Morrell and the Bloomsbury Group. Rejoining the railway, he alights at Culham and travels on to Abingdon to visit the MG Car Club, followed by a ride in a vintage MG VA.
2	"Stoke Mandeville to Beaconsfield"	27 April 2021
Leaving the train at Stoke Mandeville station, Portillo visits Stoke Mandeville Hospital in Buckinghamshire where the pioneering rehabilitation work carried out there by Sir Ludwig Guttmann led to the development of the Paralympic Games. Next stop is Princes Risborough and, just outside the town, Portillo experiences the notorious Kop Hill Climb in a motorcycle sidecar. Later, he visits the Ercol furniture factory, and then visits Beaconsfield to see Bekonscot Model Village.
3	"West Ruislip to Windsor"	28 April 2021
Alighting at West Ruislip, Portillo travels to the London suburb of Pinner to see the Heath Robinson Museum, and then travels to Slough for the Slough Trading Estate, where he visits the Mars factory. After exploring Stoke Poges Memorial Gardens, Portillo travels the short branch line to Windsor and Eton Central to visit Windsor Castle, where he learns more about the Abdication of Edward VIII.
4	"Guildford to Aldershot"	29 April 2021
Portillo arrives in the Surrey town of Guildford to explore its Anglican Cathedral and find out about its architect, Edward Maufe. Next, he travels to Chilworth and hears about Agatha Christie's disappearance from Newlands Corner. In Farnham, Portillo delves into the history of artist W. H. Allen, and in the grounds of Farnham Castle, he tries his hand at painting. After overnighting in the castle, he takes the train to the Army garrison town of Aldershot where he meets some Army Reservists.
5	"Farnborough to Winchester"	30 April 2021
Portillo travels to Farnborough where he learns about the airfield's long association with aeronautical research and development when he visits the Farnborough Air Sciences Trust Museum. Alighting next at Basingstoke Station, Portillo visits Highclere Castle – the main location for the historical television drama series Downton Abbey – and learns how George Herbert, 5th Earl of Carnarvon, discovered the tomb of Tutankhamun. Then he goes to the Sandham Memorial Chapel to see its collection of paintings by Stanley Spencer. Travelling on to Winchester, he visits the cathedral, and then rides on the Mid-Hants Railway and discovers more about Thomas the Tank Engine author The Reverend Wilbert Awdry.
Saxmundham to Walsingham
6	"Saxmundham to Dedham"	3 May 2021
Portillo alights at Saxmundham to visit Summerhill School, founded in 1921 by Alexander Sutherland Neill, and afterwards he travels to the historic market town of Woodbridge, Suffolk. After exploring nearby Sutton Hoo, Portillo heads to Felixstowe to catch the ferry to Harwich, where he learns about the Kindertransport – the evacuation of Jewish children from Germany to England during World War II. His final stop is Manningtree, gateway to the Stour Valley – an area made famous by painter Constable, to visit the Castle House, Dedham which was home to the artist, Sir Alfred Munnings.
7	"Colchester to Chadwell Heath"	4 May 2021
Arriving by train at Colchester, Portillo travels to Abberton Reservoir, and then heads to Witham, to visit the nearby Tiptree jam factory and learn about the Women's Land Army. His next stop is Chelmsford station, for the Essex parish of Writtle, to see where the UK's first regular radio broadcasts were made. Returning to the train, he rides to Chadwell Heath to visit Becontree, which was once the largest public housing estate in the world.
8	"Potters Bar to Cardington"	5 May 2021
Portillo arrives at Potters Bar to visit the Lee Valley White Water Centre, where he learns how the explorer John MacGregor publicised canoeing as a sport. He next leaves the train at Hatfield to visit Camfield Place, the residence of the late Dame Barbara Cartland. Next stop is Stevenage station for Allied Bakeries, before heading to Cardington Airfield where he learns about airship development at that site.
9	"Sawbridgeworth to Cambridge"	6 May 2021
Portillo alights at Sawbridgeworth to visit Henry Moore Studios & Gardens, and then travels to Cambridge to learn about the Cambridge Spy Ring. After touring the Cavendish Laboratory, where the atom was first split, Portillo travels to Cambridge North station and explains that the station was built in the Bauhaus style; he then visits Impington Village College, which was designed by Maxwell Fry and Bauhaus founder, Walter Gropius.
10	"Newmarket to Walsingham"	7 May 2021
Portillo visits Newmarket's famous racing stables to learn more about the town's long history of horse racing. He travels on to Ickworth House, the former residence of the Marquess of Bristol, where he helps prepare a meal from a 1930s recipe. Next alighting at Downham Market, Portillo visits the nearby British Sugar Wissington sugar refinery, and moves on to ride the Wells and Walsingham Light Railway from Wells on Sea to Walsingham, where he explores the remains of Walsingham Priory and visits the Anglican Shrine of Our Lady of Walsingham.
Crewe to Newtown
11	"Crewe to Shotton"	10 May 2021
Portillo visits Crewe Station, which was featured in the documentary Night Mail and learns about the making of that film and some of the history of this important rail hub. He then travels to Chester station for a walk on the city walls, followed by a visit to nearby Chester Zoo. Alighting next at Wrexham, Portillo travels to the former Gresford Colliery, site of the 1934 Gresford disaster which claimed 266 lives, and also goes to All Saints' Church to see a painting of the colliery. He ends this leg in Shotton with a visit to the Tata steelworks.
12	"Rhyl to Anglesey"	11 May 2021
Portillo arrives in the seaside resort of Rhyl, where he visits the Marine Lake and takes a ride on the Rhyl Miniature Railway. Returning to the main line, he next alights at Colwyn Bay station to learn about the important role played by the Ministry of Food during World War II. After overnighting in Llandudno's Imperial Hotel, he travels to Bangor, where he visits the BBC Radio Cymru studios to hear how the BBC responded to calls for Welsh language broadcasting and participates in a live broadcast. Rejoining the train, he crosses the Britannia Bridge to Anglesey and his next stop at Llanfairpwll to visit Plas Newydd, where he sees Capriccio, a large mural painted by Rex Whistler.
13	"Bangor to Betws y Coed"	12 May 2021
Portillo begins in Bangor railway station, where he learns about 'Operation Pied Piper', the evacuations of civilians in Britain during World War II. Travelling on from Llandudno Junction, he alights at Tal-y-Cafn to visit nearby Bodnant Garden. He next travels to Dolgarrog to learn about its 1925 dam disaster. Portillo's last stop is Betws-y-Coed, gateway to Snowdonia, where he learns about the Pinnacle Club, a women's rock climbing club, and tries some rock climbing.
14	"Blaenau Ffestiniog to Barmouth"	13 May 2021
Portillo arrives in Blaenau Ffestiniog where he learns how valuable paintings from the National Gallery in London were secretly hidden in Wales during World War II. Then he rides the Ffestiniog Railway from Tan-y-Bwlch to the harbour town of Porthmadog. After visiting T. E. Lawrence's birthplace in Tremadog, Portillo travels to the tourist village of Portmeirion, the location for the 1960s television show The Prisoner. He ends his journey travelling from Minffordd to Barmouth, where he sees the Jesuit Villa, a holiday retreat for Jesuit trainees.
15	"Aberystwyth to Newtown"	14 May 2021
Portillo's first stop is the coastal town of Aberystwyth, where he explores the National Library of Wales, before riding on the heritage Vale of Rheidol Railway to Devil's Bridge station in Ceredigion to see the red kites. Returning to Aberystwyth, he visits Pen Dinas, the site of an iron age hill fort. The final stop is Newtown, where he visits Gregynog Hall, the former home of Welsh philanthropist sisters Gwendoline and Margaret Davies.

=== Series 13 (2021) ===
No.	Title	Original release date
Biggin Hill to Leeds Castle, Kent
1	"Biggin Hill to Ashdown Forest"	17 May 2021
Portillo visits the famous wartime airfield of Biggin Hill to learn about its important role during World War II defending London and South East England, and takes to the skies in a Spitfire. Alighting at East Grinstead, he overnights at Ashdown Park, which has a link to an unsung hero of the railways, Thomas Brassey, the great railway builder of the 19th century. Portillo then makes his way to Ashdown Forest, the setting for the Winnie-the-Pooh stories, and later visits Hartfield, the village where author A. A. Milne and his son Christopher Robin lived.
2	"Hassocks to Benenden"	18 May 2021
Portillo travels to Ditchling, East Sussex, home to the late Dame Vera Lynn and several prominent artists, including Sir Frank Brangwyn and Raymond Briggs. He travels on to the seaside town of Bexhill and then to Burwash to visit nearby Bateman's, home to The Jungle Book author Rudyard Kipling, who lived there from 1902 until his death in 1936. Portillo ends his journey at The Grange in Benenden, where he learns about the work done in preserving Japanese heritage by British plant collector Collingwood Ingram.
3	"Rye to Dungeness"	19 May 2021
First stop is Rye in East Sussex, where Portillo delves into the events of the 1928 Mary Stanford Lifeboat Disaster. After visiting a nearby World War II coastal Pillbox, he travels along the Romney, Hythe and Dymchurch light railway from New Romney to Dungeness, where he visits the former RAF base at Denge.
4	"Deal to Margate"	20 May 2021
Portillo begins his journey in Deal with a visit to Walmer Castle, and then travels on to the seaside town of Ramsgate where he explores its World War II tunnels. Continuing along the coast, Portillo visits Margate to look into the town's post-war development and visit its amusement park Dreamland.
5	"Herne Bay to Leeds Castle, Kent"	21 May 2021
Portillo visits Herne Bay to learn more about pioneering English pilot Amy Johnson. Travelling on to the seaside town of Whitstable, Portillo first takes a boat into the Thames Estuary to see the World War II armed forts. Upon returning to Whitstable, he samples its famous oysters. Reboarding the train, he travels on to Lenham, from where he visits nearby Leeds Castle.
Chislehurst to Westminster
6	"Chislehurst to Kennington"	24 May 2021
Portillo explores the Chislehurst Caves and learns about their use during World War II as an air raid shelter. He then travels to Eltham Palace, where Henry VIII grew up. After visiting Peckham to learn about the work done by Jamaican-born physician Harold Moody who started the League of Coloured Peoples, Portillo travels to Kennington and delves into the rags to riches career of one of its most famous residents, Charlie Chaplin.
7	"Hackney Wick to Oxford Circus"	25 May 2021
Portillo travels to Hackney Wick and visits the offices of the Morning Star. He then continues across East London to Repton Boxing Club in Bethnal Green and learns about the successful career of boxer Ted "Kid" Lewis. After overnighting in Kings Cross, Portillo visits Veeraswamy, the UK's oldest Indian restaurant where he tries his hand at making Indian food.
8	"Hampstead to Islington"	26 May 2021
Alighting at Finchley Road, Portillo heads to Hampstead to visit the Freud Museum, and then goes to the Abbey Road Studios and crosses the zebra crossing made famous by the Beatles. After learning about the origins of darts during a visit to a London pub, Portillo travels to Finsbury Health Centre, which was designed by Berthold Lubetkin and the Tecton architecture practice.
9	"Dagenham to Battersea"	27 May 2021
Portillo meets the Dagenham Girl Pipers who were founded by the Reverend Joseph Waddington Graves in 1930. Moving on to North Greenwich, Portillo visits the Thames Barrier and then makes his way to Battersea Power Station to be shown the progress in its redevelopment.
10	"Park Royal to Westminster"	29 May 2021
Alighting at Park Royal, Portillo travels to nearby Ealing and the Brentham Lawn Tennis Club to learn about former World No. 1 tennis player Fred Perry. He then visits the London Transport Museum Acton Depot, before overnighting at The Dorchester in London's Mayfair. At the Royal Academy of Arts, Portillo recounts the rise of arts in London during the late 18th century, and then ends his journey at the Churchill War Rooms.

=== Series 14 (2023) ===
No.	Title	Original release date
Preston to Hebden Bridge
1	"Preston to Rawtenstall"	19 June 2023
Portillo's first stop is Preston where he goes to Market Square to see the Preston Cenotaph and then goes to Fulwood Barracks to learn about National Service. He then visits a stretch of the M6, which was the first motorway to be opened in the UK. His next stop is Blackburn where he talks to former politician, Jack Straw, about Barbara Castle, the town's former MP, before seeing a statue of her in Jubilee Square. After visiting a 1950s style signal box, he takes a ride on the East Lancashire Railway from Bury Bolton Street to Rawtenstall.
2	"Urmston to New Islington"	20 June 2023
From the train, Portillo observes the Manchester Ship Canal, before alighting at Urmston. He then visits Trafford General Hospital, the birthplace of the NHS, where he hears about Nye Bevan's 1948 visit. Next, he takes the train to Deansgate and then the tram to Media City UK for the set of Coronation Street, where he interviews actor William Roache. In the Science and Industry Museum, he learns about the world's first programmable computer. His final stop is New Islington where he sees how a former textile mill has been converted into modern work spaces.
3	"Oldham to Wakefield"	21 June 2023
Portillo alights at Oldham Central to visit Oldham Coliseum where he finds out about theatre censorship in the 1950s and 1960s. Then, from Manchester Picadilly he takes the train through the Peak District National Park to Edale for a walk on the Trans Pennine Trail, accompanied by a member of the walking group, Black Girls Hike. He next alights at Sheffield to learn about cutlery manufacturing, and at Samuel Staniforth Ltd he helps make a knife. He then travels to Darton for the Yorkshire Sculpture Park to see sculptures by Barbara Hepworth.
4	"Wakefield to Leeds"	22 June 2023
Alighting at Wakefield Kirkgate, Portillo visits the National Coal Mining Museum for England and then sees the Lofthouse Colliery disaster memorial. Returning to the city centre, he sees peregrine falcons on the spires of Wakefield Cathedral. At the DoubleTWO shirtmaking factory, he is shown the very first polyester shirt to be made by the company. He then takes the train to Leeds station, where he observes the recent redevelopment and the Art Deco style booking hall. In Chapeltown, he sees preparations for the Leeds Carnival and tries his hand at playing the steel drums. Then in Harehills, he visits back-to-back houses.
5	"Bradford to Hebden Bridge"	23 June 2023
Portillo alights at Bradford Interchange to walk through Bradford's historic centre where he sees J. B. Priestley's statue. Then, at the J. B. Priestley Library, he learns more about the prolific writer. Portillo then overnights in the Midland Railway Hotel. In the morning, he visits the Institute of Cancer Therapeutics, before departing from Bradford Forster Square for Shipley, where he alights. Portillo observes that the middle of the station has been turned into a butterfly reserve. Next, he rides on the Calder Valley Line to Hebden Bridge where he finds out about the Happy Valley Pride event.
Tilbury to Cambridge
6	"Tilbury to Barbican"	26 June 2023
Portillo crosses the Thames to Tilbury Docks where he meets historian Colin Grant, chronicler of the Caribbean migrants who were to become known as the Windrush Generation. Returning to the main line and changing to the Docklands Light Railway at West Ham, he alights at London City Airport to visit the Tate & Lyle sugar refinery. Next he travels to Limehouse, where he hears how Clement Attlee became its MP after seeing extreme poverty in the East End. Then he goes to Toynbee Hall to see how the local communtity is being helped through participation in activities. Then, from Whitechapel Station, he travels to Barbican Underground Station to visit the Barbican estate, where he looks at brutalist architecture.
7	"Waterloo to Regent's Park"	27 June 2023
Portillo disembarks close to the Houses of Parliament and crosses the river to the South Bank Centre, where he learns about the Festival of Britain. After a ride on the London Eye, he takes the tube from Emabankment to Sloane Square. Here he hears about Elizabeth David, the cookery writer and then has a cooking lesson at the Bibendum Restaurante. Next he goes to Covent Garden for the Sassoon Salon, where he learns about Vidal Sassoon and is taught how to cut a bob. Then he travels to Regents Park to visit a mosque designed by Frederick Gibberd.
8	"Paddington to Ongar"	28 June 2023
Portillo starts at Paddington Station, where he views the new Elizabeth line before travelling to Tottenham Court Road to learn about the smoke fog of December 1952 and the subsequent introduction of the Clean Air Act 1956. In the BT Tower, he sees how air quality is being monitored. He then continues eastwards to Stratford, where he sees a statue of theatre director Joan Littlewood. Next he talks to young actors at the Theatre Royal Stratford East. Continuing on the Elizabeth Line to its terminus at Shenfield, he transfers to the Epping Ongar Railway and travels from North Weald to Ongar to visit a nuclear bunker.
9	"Felixstowe to Norwich"	29 June 2023
Alighting at Felixstowe, Portillo hears about the floods of 1953 before travelling to Ipswich to see the new flood defences. His next stop is Melton, for the coastal village of Orford, where he sees how many military technologies were developed. He then travels to Norwich to visit a Royal Mail sorting office, where he learns about the introduction of the postcode. Still in Norwich, he visits the University of East Anglia and hears about the new post-war universities, before joining a creative writing workshop.
10	"Brandon to Cambridge"	30 June 2023
Portillo's first stop is Brandon where he goes to a Quorn Foods factory to see how Mycoprotein based food is produced and then tastes one of these products. Then, returning to the train, he next alights at Lakenheath to visit RAF Lakenheath for a guided tour around the base. His next stop is King's Lynn, whose station is considered by Portillo to be one of his favourites. Here, he learns how farming became more efficient due to fertilisers and tractors, then sees an alternative, regenerative agriculture. His final destination on this journey is Cambridge. At Cambridge University he visits the MRC Laboratory of Molecular Biology to understand the contribution made by Francis Crick, James Watson and Rosalind Franklin in deducing the double helix structure of DNA.
Derby to Filton
11	"Derby to Hinckley"	17 July 2023
Portillo begins in Derby, where he explores the city's long history of building trains and then drives a new electric train on a test track at the Litchurch Lane Works. Returning to Derby Station, his next stop is East Midlands Parkway to see a coal fired power station before continuing to Leicester, where he visits a Walkers Crisps factory. Here he learns about Henry Walker, the company's founder, and then sees crisp production. He then travels from Hinckley Station to Stoney Cove to learn about Scuba Diving training.
12	"Coventry to Leamington Spa"	18 July 2023
Alighting at Coventry, Portillo notes the contrast between medieval and modern architecture in the city. Then he visits Coventry Cathedral where he explains how, in 1951, Basil Spence won a competition to design the new cathedral. In the Coventry Transport Museum he samples Coventry God Cakes and at the LEVC factory he sees taxi cab production. Next, he takes the train to Leamington Spa and observes the fine Georgian architecture in the town. Then he visits The Guide Dogs for the Blind Association's national centre where he sees puppies at the start of their journey to become working animals.
13	"Long Itchington to Moseley"	19 July 2023
Portillo goes to Long Itchington to see construction of the first phase of HS2 and goes inside the control room of a tunnel boring machine. Returning to Leamington Spa, his next leg takes him to Stratford-Upon-Avon where he visits the Royal Shakespeare Theatre and learns how the Royal Shakespeare Company was founded. His next stop is Birmingham Moor Street Station which has been restored to its former 1930s style. In Handsworth he goes to the Prince of Wales pub to listen to Bhangra music. Then he visits Moseley where he learns about prefabricated homes.
14	"Wolverhampton to Cheltenham"	20 July 2023
Alighting at Wolverhampton, Portillo meets Wolverhampton born cultural historian, Patrick Burnham OBE, who talks about the politician, Enoch Powell. He then visits the African and Caribbean Heritage Centre. Returning to the railway, he travels to Kidderminster for the Drakelow Tunnels, where aircraft components were manufactured during World War 2. His next stop is Worcester Foregate Street to visit King's Hawford School to learn about pigeon racing and see the school's flock. He then joins the Gloucestershire Warwickshire Railway at Broadway Station and alights at Cheltenham Race Course Station to see preparations for Cheltenham's annual jazz festival.
15	"Tewkesbury to Filton"	21 July 2023
Portillo alights at Ashchurch for Tewkesbury to visit the Abbey. Next he goes to Eastnor Castle, where he meets its current owner, the 2nd Baron Lord Summers, who explains how some stately homes have managed to survive until the present. Then, on the surrounding estate, Portillo drives a Land Rover over rough terrain. From Gloucester Station he travels to Coleford in the Forest of Dean to visit a Ribena factory. Then he takes the train to Cam and Dursley for WWT Slimbridge, where he hears how Sir Peter Scott set up this wetland wildlife reserve.

=== Series 15 (2024) ===
No.	Title	Original release date
Denham to Heathrow
1	"Denham to Swindon"	18 March 2024
Portillo starts this journey from Marylebone Station and alights at Denham to see the construction site of the Colne Valley Viaduct. Continuing to High Wycombe, he visits the William Hands Company, which has been making furniture since 1906. Next he travels to Oxford to learn about the Oxfam charity, and he visits the original Oxfam shop, followed by an Oxfam superstore. Back on the railway, after changing trains at Didcot Parkway, he alights at Swindon for Eastbrook Farm near Bishopstone, where he meets Helen Browning OBE, who tells him about Organic Farming and Lady Eve Balfour's contribution to this field.
2	"Chippenham to Yeovil"	19 March 2024
Portillo's next stop is Chippenham to visit a Siemens factory where railway signalling equipment is made. Continuing his journey, he changes trains at Bath before alighting at Frome for Longleat House where he interviews Ceawlin Thynn, 8th Marquess of Bath. This is followed by a tour of Longleat Safari and Adventure Park and a ride on the Longleat narrow gauge railway. Back on the main line, his next stop is Yeovil Pen Mill to visit Royal Naval Air Station Yeovilton. There, he is shown a Westland Wasp anti-submarine helicopter, followed by a helicopter flight simulator, before concluding the day with a ride in a 1954 Harvard aeroplane.
3	"Swanage to Portchester"	20 March 2024
After a ride on the Swanage Railway, Portillo alights at Swanage and visits the pier where he learns about Enid Blyton from Andrew Maunder, a biographer of the children's author. Together, they then travel by train to see Corfe Castle. From Wareham, Portillo takes the train to Poole to meet Cressida Granger, owner of the Mathmos lighting company, and sees how lava lamps are made. Continuing his rail journey through the New Forest to Southampton Central, he then catches the train to Romsey, travelling on to the Broadlands Estate where he learns about Lord Louis Mountbatten, the last Viceroy of India. Portillo's next journey is to Portchester to visit Griffon Hoverwork where he sees hovercraft being built. He then takes the hovercraft service from Southsea to the Isle of Wight, the only year-round public hovercraft service in the world still in operation.
4	"Havant to Guildford"	21 March 2024
Portillo's first stop is Havant to visit the Havant Museum where he learns about the town's former Scalextric factory and sees a vintage car racing set. He then takes the train to Rowlands Castle for the South Downs National Park, where he visits the Hambledon Vineyard and talks to its owner, Ian Kellett. After visiting nearby Droxford, he continues his rail journey to Haslemere where, at the Haslemere Educational Museum, he learns about Carl Dolmetsch who manufactured and popularised the recorder. His last stop is Guildford to visit Surrey Satellite Technology, where he talks to its founder, Martin Sweeting, and is shown the Spacecraft Operations Centre and a newly built satellite.
5	"Wokingham to Heathrow"	22 March 2024
Portillo alights at Wokingham to visit the Transport Research Laboratory at Crowthorne, where he learns how road safety has been improved and rides in a 1967 MG MGB car. Continuing his journey, he changes trains at Reading before alighting at Southall. Here he is shown Punjabi businesses in the High Street and visits Southall Gudwara. His last stop is Heathrow Terminal 5 to see Heathrow Airport, including the new digital control tower.
Loch Lomond to Loch of the Lowes
6	"Loch Lomond to Kelvinbridge"	25 March 2024
Starting a new journey in Scotland, Portillo's first stop is Arrochar and Tarbet to visit Loch Lomond, where he learns about the mountains that have become known as Munros, named after Sir Hugh Thomas Munro , who first listed them. He then travels to Balloch, West Dunbartonshire to see PS Maid of the Loch, the last paddle steamer built in Britain. After observing restoration work on the steamer, Michael enters the Steam Winch House and operates the winch. Continuing by rail to Partick, he joins the Glasgow Subway and then alights at Govan for the Govan shipyards. Archive footage from the 1970s of industrial action is shown and he then sees ship building in progress at BAE Systems. His next stop is Kelvinbridge to visit a successful restaurant founded by immigrants from Pakistan. After hearing the claim that Chicken tikka masala was invented in this restaurant by Ali Ahmed Aslam, he helps prepare this dish.
7	"Glasgow to Cumbernauld"	26 March 2024
Portillo's first stop today is Mount Florida to visit Hampden Park, the national football stadium of Scotland, where he meets Lord William Haughey who discusses the history of the stadium and Celtic Football Club. Then Michael visits Cathkin Park, home of the Jimmy Johnstone Academy, before taking the train across the Clyde to Glasgow Central. He takes the subway to Kinning Park and then meets civil engineer Stuart Baird, who has created an archive of Glasgow's motorway history. Next he visits Kelvingrove Art Gallery and Museum to learn about the artist Joan Eardley. After seeing the city centre, he walks to Glasgow Queen Street and takes the train to Cumbernauld to see the new town. He then meets a resident who moved there from a Glasgow tenement.
8	"Shawlands to Livingston"	27 March 2024
Portillo alights at Shawlands for Pollok Country Park where he learns about pioneering long-distance runner Dale Greig. He then does warm up exercises with Bellahouston Harriers, Dale's first club. Returning to central Glasgow, he takes the train from Argyle Street to Dalmarnock where he visits the Glasgow Observatory in Cuningar Loop Park. Here he sees a mine water geothermal research site. Continuing to Livingston North, Michael goes to Dechmont Woods to find out about a UFO sighting known as the Robert Taylor incident. His next stop is Edinburgh Waverley and, on the Esplanade of the castle, he learns about the Edinburgh Tattoo.
9	"Edinburgh to Queensferry"	28 March 2024
Portillo alights at Newtongrange for the National Mining Museum Scotland to learn about Mick McGahey, who was vice president of the National Union of Mineworkers. He then returns to Edinburgh Waverley for a walk through the city centre, before taking the train to South Gyle station to meet Stuart Wood, former member of pop rock band Bay City Rollers. Michael's next stop is Dalmeny station for Progress Rail South Quensferry, to see how rail crossings are made. Then he sees the original Forth Bridge, the Forth Road Bridge and the more recent Queensferry Crossing.
10	"Dundee to Loch of the Lowes"	29 March 2024
After crossing the Tay Bridge, Portillo alights at Dundee and at The McManus Art Gallery he learns about Scottish photographer Joseph McKenzie. Then he meets Calum Colvin, a former pupil of Mckenzie, who, at Duncan of Jordanstone College of Art, helps Michael develop a photograph in the darkroom. Returning to the railway, his next stop is Perth to meet folk singer Fraser Bruce, before visiting Wellshill Cemetery where 355 Polish service men are buried and here he learns about the Polish community in Scotland. For the last leg of this journey, he takes the Intercity 125 to Dunkeld & Birnam to see Ospreys at Loch of the Lowes.
Liverpool to Chester-le-Street
11	"Liverpool to Uttoxeter"	1 April 2024
Portillo alights at Liverpool Central to visit Liverpool Metropolitan Cathedral where he talks to the Dean, Tony O'Brien. Then, in Hope Street, he learns about the prolific poet and painter Adrian Henri before going to the waterfront where he talks about Liverpool's regeneration. From Lime Street Station, he takes the train to Goostrey, via Crewe, to see Jodrell Bank Observatory. Here he meets Professor of Astrophysics, Tim O'Brien. Michael then continues his rail journey and, after changing trains at Crewe, arrives at Uttoxeter. He visits the JCB (heavy equipment manufacturer) headquarters and factory in Uttoxeter, where he learns about the company's founder, Joseph Cyril Bamford.
12	"Derby to Nottingham"	2 April 2024
Portillo alights at Peartree station for the Rolls-Royce headquarters in Derby. Here he sees a Battle of Britain Memorial Window and some of the company's aeroplane engines, including the RB211. Then he is shown Testbed 80, the world's largest indoor aerospace testing facility. The next stop on his journey is Derby Midland to see the Ronald Pope sculptures housed at the University of Derby and is then shown one of the artist's sketchbooks. Next he travels to the Railway Technical Centre to learn about the Advanced Passenger Train and to see an example of the research that is carried out there. His next stop is Nottingham to meet the managing director of the Raleigh Bicycle Company, Lee Kidger. Michael ends this episode by riding a vintage Raleigh Chopper.
13	"Lincoln to York"	3 April 2024
Portillo arrives in Lincoln to visit Brayford Pool, Britain's oldest inland harbour, where he learns about the work of the Inland Waterways Association before taking a narrowboat cruise on the Foss Dyke. Then he continues to Hull to find out about the poet Philip Larkin by visiting the Brynmor Jones Library where Larkin worked as the university librarian. While still in Hull, Michael sees the Humber Bridge before taking the train to York. At St Mary's Abbey, he learns how the medieval Mystery Plays were revived in 1951 as part of the Festival of Britain and then, at Holy Trinity Church, he sees rehearsals for the current version of the plays .
14	"York to Skipton"	4 April 2024
Portillo visits York's National Railway Museum where he goes inside the driver's compartment of an Intercity 125. His next destination is Harrogate to see Harlow Carr public gardens. After seeing Bettys Cafe Tearoom, Harrogate, he learns about Yorkshire Tea from Ben Newbury, the current custodian of the brand, before trying tea tasting. His next stop is Skipton to see how Yorkshire Wildlife Trust is protecting peat bogs.
15	"Northallerton to Chester-le-Street"	5 April 2024
Portillo alights at Northallerton for the Infantry Training Centre at Catterick, North Yorkshire to meet some Gurkhas. From Leeming Bar Station he rides on the Wensleydale Railway to Leyburn and then visits Wensleydale Creamery to learn about their eponymous cheese. After rejoining the mainline at Thirsk, he travels to Middlesbrough to see the chemical plant at Wilton International. His final destination is Chester-le-Street to visit Beamish Museum. Here he goes to a 1950s themed hairdressers before learning about Frank Atkinson, the museum's founder.

=== Series 16 (2025) ===
No.	Title	Original release date
Paddock Wood to Amberley
1	"Paddock Wood to Frant"	7 April 2025
2	"Hildenborough to Robertsbridge"	8 April 2025
3	"Dorking to Lingfield"	9 April 2025
4	"Gatwick Airport to Royal Tunbridge Wells"	10 April 2025
5	"Chichester to Amberley"	11 April 2025
Windermere to Auchinleck
6	"Windermere to Sellafield"	14 April 2025
7	"St Bees to Grange-over-Sands"	15 April 2025
8	"Maryport to Penrith"	16 April 2025
9	"Aspatria to Carlisle"	17 April 2025
10	"Dumfries to Auchinleck"	18 April 2025
Shrewsbury to Birmingham International Railway Station
11	"Shrewsbury to Telford"	21 April 2025
12	"Ironbridge to Coseley"	22 April 2025
13	"Dudley to West Bromwich"	23 April 2025
14	"Birmingham New Street to Wednesbury"	24 April 2025
15	"Solihull to Birmingham International"	25 April 2025
Loughton to Wakes Colne
16	"Loughton to Audley End"	28 April 2025
17	"Romford to the Blackwater Estuary"	29 April 2025
18	"Chelmsford to Tollesbury"	30 April 2025
19	"Witham to Saffron Walden"	1 May 2025
20	"Colchester to Chappel and Wakes Colne"	2 May 2025

== Books ==
Great British Railway Journeys, written by Charlie Bunce with a foreword by Michael Portillo, was published by Collins in January 2011.

Great Victorian Railway Journeys, written by Karen Farrington with a foreword by Michael Portillo, was published by Collins in January 2012.

The Complete Great British Railway Journeys, an amalgam of the above two books, was published by Collins in January 2015.

In October 2020, Greatest British Railway Journeys was published to mark the programme's 10th anniversary.

== See also ==
- Great Railway Journeys
