= Thomas Andrews (ironmaster) =

English chemist and ironmaster (1847–1907)

Thomas Andrews FRSE FRS FCE ICE (16 February 1847 – 19 June 1907) was an English metallurgical chemist and ironmaster.

== Life ==
Born at Sheffield on 16 February 1847, he was only son of Thomas Andrews, proprietor of the Wortley Iron Works, near the town, and his wife Mary Bolsover. He was educated at Broombank school, Sheffield, and then as a student of chemistry under Dr. James Allan of Sheffield.

Andrews early undertook original scientific research, with the practical advice and guidance of his father, who died in 1871. He then became head at Wortley.

In 1888 Andrews was elected a fellow of the Royal Society. He was also a fellow of the Royal Society of Edinburgh and of the Chemical Society, and member of the Institution of Civil Engineers and Society of Engineers. He acted as consultant to the Admiralty and the Board of Trade on metallurgical questions. At Cambridge University he delivered lectures to engineering students; and at Sheffield was an advocate of technical education directed to industrial ends, assisted in founding and developing Sheffield University.

Andrews died at his home, "Ravencrag", near Sheffield, on 19 June 1907.

== Works ==
After investigation on a large scale Andrews determined the resistance of metals to sudden concussion at temperatures down to 0° Fahrenheit; and was one of the first to study metals by the aid of the microscope, following up the inquiries of Henry Clifton Sorby. In technical periodicals he published around 40 papers: the Society of Engineers awarded him two premiums for papers in their Transactions, "On the Strength of Wrought-iron Railway Axles" (1879), and "On the Effect of Strain on Railway Axles" (1895). In 1902 he received the Society's gold medal for the memoir "Effect of Segregation on the Strength of Steel Rails".

In 1884 the Institution of Civil Engineers awarded him a Telford medal. A major paper on "Wear of Steel Rails on Bridges" was published in the Journal of the Iron and Steel Institute (1895).

Andrews by microscopic examination of metallic materials looked to determine the cause of naval accidents, and he contributed on the subject to Engineering (1904). In a paper on the microscopic effects of stress on platinum (Roy. Soc. Proc. 1902) he broke new ground.

He was author of Thoughts on Faith and Scepticism.

== Family ==
Andrews married in 1870 Mary Hannah, daughter of Charles Stanley of Rotherham, and had issue three sons (two died in childhood) and one daughter.

== Notes ==
Attribution

This article incorporates text from a publication now in the public domain: Lee, Sidney, ed. (1912). "Andrews, Thomas". Dictionary of National Biography (2nd supplement). Vol. 1. London: Smith, Elder & Co.
