= Listed buildings in Hunshelf =

Hunshelf is a civil parish in the metropolitan borough of Barnsley, South Yorkshire, England. The ward contains 23 listed buildings that are recorded in the National Heritage List for England. Of these, one is listed at Grade I, the highest of the three grades, and the others are at Grade II, the lowest grade. Apart from the hamlet of Green Moor, the parish is entirely rural. There are remnants of its industrial past in Wortley Top Forge, which is "one of only three water-powered hammer forges surviving in the United Kingdom". This is listed together with associated buildings. Most of the other listed buildings in the parish are farmhouses, farm buildings, and associated structures. The rest of the listed buildings consist of a guide post, a deer paddock, three bridges, and a set of stocks.

== Key ==
Grade	Criteria
I	Particularly important buildings of more than special interest
II	Buildings of national importance and special interest

== Buildings ==
Name and location	Photograph	Date	Notes	Grade
Dean Head Farmhouse; 53.49781°N 1.59558°W	—	Medieval	The oldest part is the cross-wing, the main part dates from the 17th century, and there were additions in the 19th century. The farmhouse is in stone with a stone slate roof. There are two storeys, an L-shaped plan with the cross-wing projecting on the left, two bays in the cross-wing, and two in the main part. There is one former three-light window with the mullions removed, and the other windows are replacement casements.	II
Barn south of Dean Head Farmhouse; 53.49758°N 1.59562°W	—	16th century	The barn is timber framed, and was later encased in stone. It has a stone slate roof, and there are five internal bays. The barn contains a square-headed cart entry, three smaller entries, and two square pitching holes.	II
Outbuilding, Holly Hall; 53.48637°N 1.56549°W	—	17th century	A stone building with a stone slate roof, two storeys and three bays. It contains a doorway with a stone lintel, and the windows are mullioned, with a hood mould in the ground floor.	II
Wortley Top Forge; 53.49477°N 1.55757°W		17th century	The forge, which has been altered and extended, is in stone with a Welsh slate upper roof, and a stone slate lower roof. It has a rectangular plan with a continuous rear outshut, and wheel pits at the front. Recessed on the left is a two-bay arcade with brick voussoirs and cast iron columns.	I
Cloth Hall Farmhouse; 53.50170°N 1.60752°W	—	Late 17th century	The farmhouse, which was partly remodelled in 1723, is in stone, and has a stone slate roof with gable copings, chamfered on the left, on moulded kneelers. There are two storeys and three bays, the left bay gabled, and the windows are mullioned. In the left bay is a continuous hood mould and a small window in the gable apex. To the right is a doorway with a square head and an initialled and dated keystone.	II
Barn, Cloth Hall Farm; 53.50146°N 1.60729°W	—	Late 17th century	The barn is in stone with quoins and an asbestos sheet roof. There are five internal bays, an aisle at the front, and a rear outshut. On the centre of the front is a recessed square-headed cart entry, to the right is a chamfered entrance, and at the rear is a segmental-headed cart entry with a quoined surround.	II
Well Hill Farmhouse; 53.49360°N 1.56557°W		17th or early 18th century	The oldest part is the rear wing, with most of the farmhouse dating from the later 18th century. It is in stone with quoins and a stone slate roof. There are two storeys, and an L-shaped plan, with a symmetrical front of three bays, and a rear wing. The central doorway has a cambered head and a raised keystone, and above it is a plain tablet. Two of the windows are casements, and the others are sashes.	II
Underbank Hall; 53.49298°N 1.61578°W		Early 18th century	A large house with an earlier core, it is in stone and has a stone slate roof with chamfered gable copings on cut kneelers. There are two storeys and four parallel gabled wings, the left wing projecting at the front, and the third projecting at the rear. The doorway has a moulded architrave and a moulded cornice, over which is a three-panel plaque with coats of arms. The windows are sashes.	II
Two cottages, Wortley Top Forge; 53.49460°N 1.55764°W	—	Early 18th century	The two cottages to the south of the forge are in stone, with a later rear wing in brick, the upper roof in Welsh slate, and the lower wing in stone slate. There are two storeys, each cottage has one bay, and the rear wing gives an L-shaped plan. Between the cottages is a straight joint with quoins. The windows vary in type.	II
Guide post 53.49980°N 1.61281°W		1734	The guide post is at the junction of Salter Hill Lane with Dyson Cote Lane. It is in gritstone, and is hexagonal with a socket on the top. The sides are inscribed with the date and the distances to various towns.	II
Barn west of Underbank Hall; 53.49307°N 1.61650°W	—	Early to mid 18th century	The barn is in stone, with quoins, and a stone slate roof with chamfered gable copings on cut kneelers. It contains segmental-arched cart entries with quoined surrounds, small entrances with deep lintels, and square pitching holes.	II
Cottage and mounting block east of Underbank Hall; 53.49297°N 1.61552°W		Early to mid 18th century	The cottage is in stone, with quoins, and a stone slate roof with coped gable on cut kneelers. There are two storeys and two bays. At the rear is a doorway with a moulded architrave, the windows on the front are sashes, and at the rear are two-light casement windows. Attached to the left of the cottage is a three-step mounting block.	II
Stable range northwest of Underbank Hall; 53.49324°N 1.61634°W	—	Early to mid 18th century	The stable range is in stone, with quoins, and a stone slate roof with chamfered gable copings on cut kneelers. On the front are five stable doorways with chamfered quoined surrounds and deep lintels, square vents, and a segmental-headed cart entry. At the rear are pitching holes, and in each gable apex is a two-light window.	II
Deer Paddock; 53.49581°N 1.55899°W	—	Before 1746	The deer paddock was an enclosure for penning deer. It has a coped gritstone wall, and is about 2 metres (6 ft 7 in) high. The wall encloses a roughly elliptical-shaped area about 80 metres (260 ft) by 60 metres (200 ft).	II
Hunshelf Hall and gateway 53.49335°N 1.58758°W		1746 (probable)	A large stone house, with rusticated quoins, and a hipped Welsh slate roof. There are two storeys, and an L-shaped plan, with a symmetrical front of three bays, and an extension at the rear. The doorway has a cornice on console brackets, the windows in the ground floor are sashes, and in the upper floor they are later casements. Attached to the left is a stone gateway with a moulded architrave and a dated and initialled segmental pediment.	II
Cottage at High Wells Farm; 53.50136°N 1.60803°W	—	Late 18th century (or earlier)	The cottage is in stone, with quoins, and a stone slate roof with coped gable on cut kneelers. There are two storeys, two bays, and a rear outshut. The doorway has a quoined surround and a deep lintel, there is a blocked doorway to the left, and the windows are mullioned.	II
Top Forge Cottage; 53.49485°N 1.55802°W	—	Late 18th century	An office for Wortley Top Forge, later a cottage, it is in stone with a slate roof. There is a single storey and an attic, and three bays. Five steps lead up to a central doorway, above which is a casement window in a gabled dormer, and the other windows are sashes.	II
Forge Bridge; 53.49408°N 1.55911°W		1782	The bridge carries Forge Lane over the River Don. It is in sandstone, and consists of two segmental arches. The bridge has triangular cutwaters, a chamfered band at the base of the coped parapet, and splayed ends with square piers, the northwest pier initialled and dated.	II
Barn and farm buildings, Chapel Farm; 53.50071°N 1.60754°W	—	1787	The buildings are in stone with a stone slate roof and two storeys. They contain a segmental-arched cart entry with a dated keystone, entrances with quoined surrounds, and a pitching hole. In one building is a six-light mullioned window with some lights blocked.	II
Sharp Ford Bridge; 53.49646°N 1.56050°W		c. 1800	The bridge carries Forge Lane over the River Don. It is in stone and consists of a single segmental arch. The bridge has voussoirs, a band at road level, plain parapets, and curved walls on each side.	II
Chapel Farmhouse including chapel 53.50086°N 1.60763°W	—	Late 18th to early 19th century	The farmhouse is in stone with quoins, and a stone slate roof with chamfered gable copings on cut kneelers. There are two storeys and two bays. On the front is a porch and three-light mullioned windows, and to the right is an entrance to the chapel with a small window above. The house contains a small simple chapel.	II
Thurgoland Bridge; 53.51160°N 1.58306°W		Early 19th century	The bridge carries Sheffield Road (B6462 road) over the River Don. It is in sandstone, and consists of a single segmental arch. The bridge has piers flanking the arch and at the ends, a band, and a parapet with triangular coping.	II
Stocks; 53.49135°N 1.57602°W		Uncertain	The stocks consist of two stone posts and a bottom rail, with the top rail in wood. The left post is broken, both posts have grooved inner sides, and the rails have four notches. The stocks are enclosed by low stone walls, and at the rear is a plaque inscribed with the details of their restoration in 1937.	II
