= Green Moor =

Hamlet in South Yorkshire, England

Coordinates: 53.491°N 1.577°W

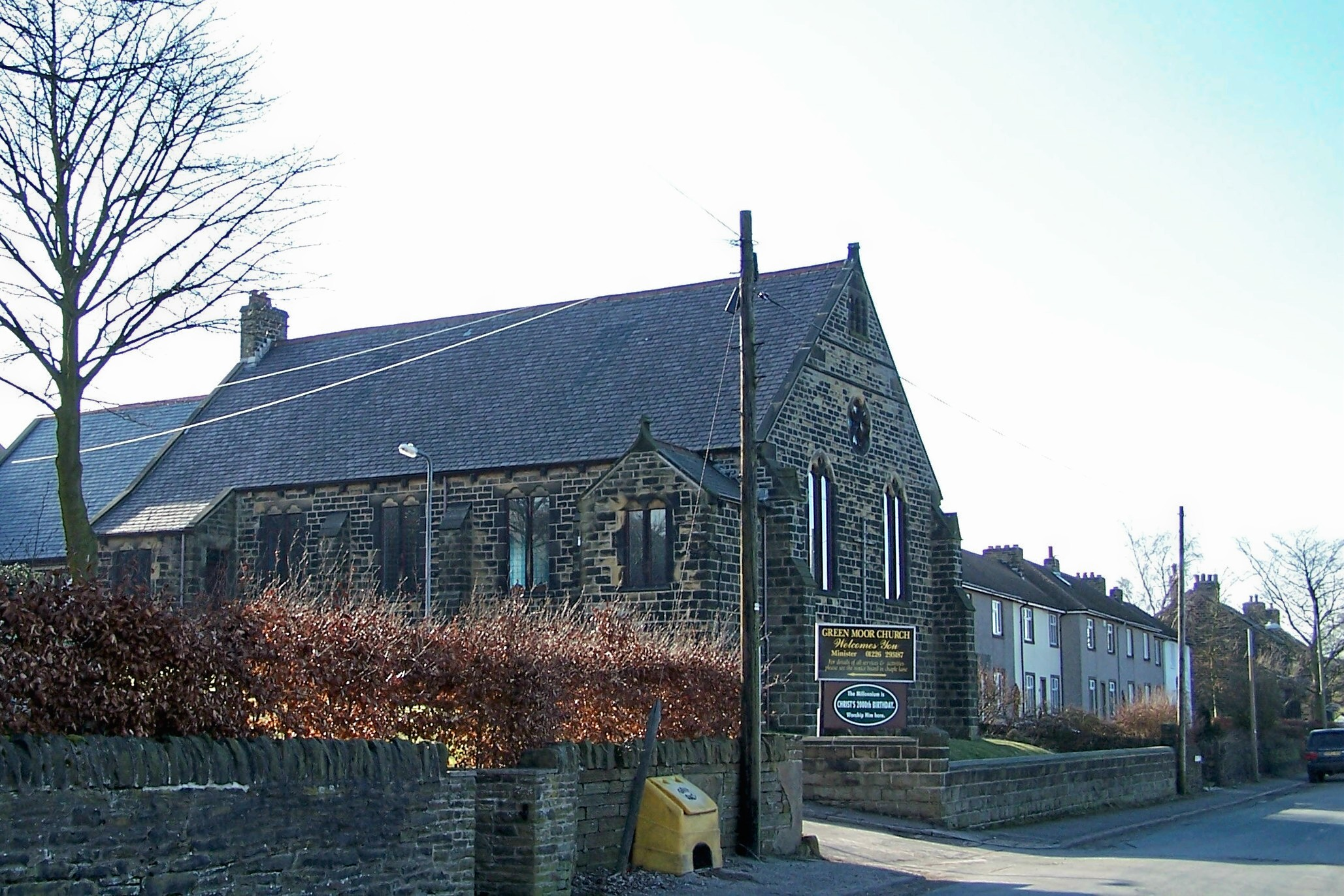
- Green Moor church (chapel)

- Location within South Yorkshire
- Civil parish: Hunshelf
- Metropolitan borough: Barnsley
- Metropolitan county: South Yorkshire
- Region: Yorkshire and the Humber
- Country: England
- Sovereign state: United Kingdom
- Post town: SHEFFIELD
- Postcode district: S35
- Dialling code: 0114
- Police: South Yorkshire
- Fire: South Yorkshire
- Ambulance: Yorkshire
- UK Parliament: Barnsley West and Penistone

Green Moor is a village near Wortley in Barnsley, South Yorkshire, England, in the parish of Hunshelf. Green Moor used to be a stone quarry in the last century but has since become a predominantly commuter and retirement village.

== History ==
Historically, Green Moor is part of the West Riding of Yorkshire in the Wapentake of Staincross and formerly part of the ancient parish of Penistone.

Sandstone quarries in the area were once worked on a large scale. During the nineteenth century stone paving was transported by sea to London. There was a Greenmoor Wharf at Southwark (and a Greenmoor Road in Enfield, London), and some of the stone flags around the Houses of Parliament came from Green Moor. Later transport was by rail from Wortley railway station, where there was a stone sawmill. Green Moor Delf Quarry stretched back from the former Rock Inn. Trunce or California Quarry is to the North West, below the village. The remains of a "Stoneway", a roadway of channelled stone slabs, link the quarry to Well Hill Road. Victoria Quarry is to the northeast of the village, close to Wortley Top Forge. Close by is a stack of stone slabs, presumably left when the quarry closed. There were a number of other small quarries in the area. Since the last quarry closed in 1936, all have been filled in to some degree. The village has an old well pumphouse and a set of village stocks that have been preserved.

The methodist chapel was built in the nineteenth century by subscription from local workers and is still used for worship.

The parish council worked to purchase a plot of former quarry land known as the "Isle of Skye", for which the parish clerk, David Horsfall, received an MBE from the Queen in 2015 for services to the community. The Isle of Skye is now public land for use by all residents and visitors.

The historical novel Echoing Hills by Phyllis Crossland is set in Green Moor in the eighteenth century.

== People ==
Adventurer and TV personality Nick Sanders lived here during the 1990s. Folk singer Kate Rusby and mathcore band Rolo Tomassi live nearby. Director Ken Loach was based in the village during his filming of Kes.

== See also ==
- Listed buildings in Hunshelf
