= Hunshelf =

Civil parish in South Yorkshire, England

Coordinates: 53.504°N 1.593°W

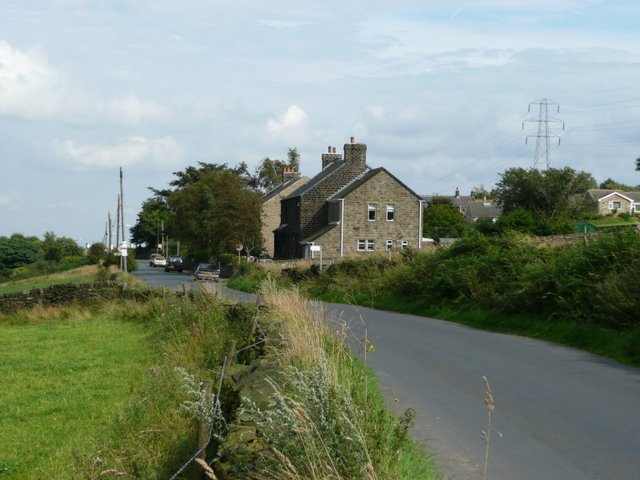
Approaching Green Moor, the main settlement in Hunshelf parish

Hunshelf is a civil parish in the Metropolitan Borough of Barnsley. At the 2001 census it had a population of 324, reducing to 246 at the 2011 Census. Most of its population lives in the village of Green Moor.

Historically, Hunshelf is part of the West Riding of Yorkshire in the Wapentake of Staincross, and the ancient Parish of Penistone.

== See also ==
- Listed buildings in Hunshelf
