= Thomas Andrews (metallurgist) =

British metallurgist (1811–1871)

Thomas Andrews (30 June 1811 – 19 June 1871) was a British metallurgist of international renown.

In 1850 Andrews, Samuel Burrows and John Burrows, trading as Andrews, Burrows and Co. took over the works at Wortley. Andrews' experiments on metal fatigue and fracture at Wortley Top Forge led to the manufacture of railway axles of internationally reputed quality.

After his death in 1871 his son Thomas Andrews (1847–1907) took an active part in running the forges.
