= Wortley Top Forge =

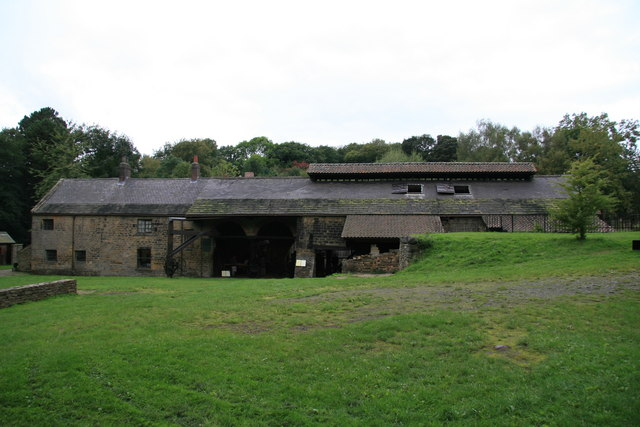
- Wortley Top Forge

- Location within South Yorkshire

General information
- Location: Barnsley, England
- Coordinates: 53.494669°N 1.557946°W

Website
- http://www.topforge.co.uk/

Scheduled monument
- Designated: 30 July 1952
- Reference no.: 1018262

Listed Building – Grade I
- Designated: 18 March 1968
- Reference no.: 1018262

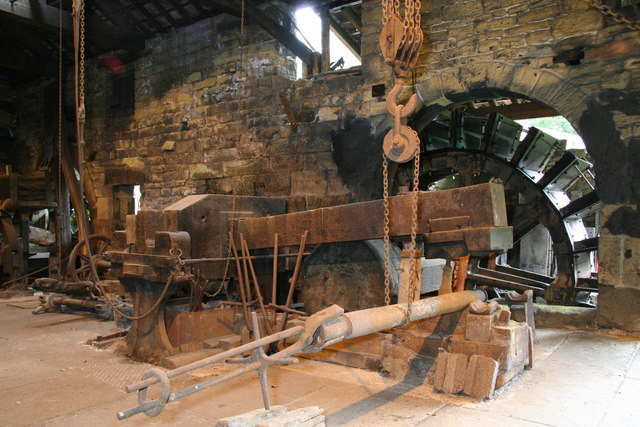
Wortley’s belly helve hammer, water-powered forging hammer

Wortley Top Forge is an historic former finery forge and ironworks dating from the seventeenth century, although evidence suggests iron working took place in the vicinity in the fourteenth century. The forge, originally created under the guidance of the devout Royalist (or Cavalier) Sir Francis Wortley, is in the metropolitan borough of Barnsley, in South Yorkshire, England, on a loop of the River Don near the villages of Thurgoland and Wortley.

The furnace is of Walloon forge type. Of particular interest is that the site only ever used waterwheels to power the machinery, which originally was based on a trip hammer with a massive timber cantilever. All three waterwheels have been restored to working order; the one depicted here is a 24 foot diameter overshot wheel with two-gallon buckets. At some point, a water wheel was used to power twin blowers for the furnace. The other buildings in the museum are used to house a variety of industrial machinery, including a Marshall twin-cylinder steam engine.

== History ==
The Top Forge was always closely related to Wortley Low Forge, a short distance downstream. One of the forges was probably built about 1639 (possibly both of them) and certainly existed by 1641, from which time the ironmasters at Wortley were Thomas Cotton and his son, William Cotton (1627–1674); the latter being the father of Thomas Cotton. Cannonballs are said to have been made here during the English Civil War. After that the finery forges usually belonged to a network of ironmasters led by members of the Spencer family of Cannon Hall, Cawthorne, but not between 1676 and 1690, when they were rented by other ironmasters. The two forges were always leased together with a blast furnace, Nether Bank Furnace, until the latter's closure probably about 1780, all of them being rented from the Wortley family.

In 1744, the forge was let to John Cockshutt (died 1774), who ran it with a partner. He also had a 'tinmill'. He was followed by his son, another John, who was succeeded by his brother James about 1800. James had worked at Merthyr Tydfil as a partner of William Crawshay in the Cyfarthfa Ironworks and when he returned to Wortley in 1791 after the dissolution of their partnership, he introduced puddling to Wortley, the tinmill was probably altered to roll blooms into bars of iron. After James' death in 1820, the works passed to relatives and then through various hands, coming into the hands of Thomas Andrews in 1849. On his death in 1871 he was followed by his son another Thomas Andrews, who died in 1907.

One of the buildings at Top Forge includes a date stone for 1713. The current layout of the building dates from the 1850s when the forge was turned over to the production of shafts and axles mainly for use on railway wagons. Some of the earliest metallurgical experiments in the world were conducted at the site by the engineer and metallurgist Thomas Andrews. Railway axles of the highest quality were manufactured at the site in the nineteenth century and exported all over the world.

Production ceased around 1912, but parts of the site remained in use until 1929. One of the Top Forge hammers was run as a demonstration in 1933 or 1934. In 1955, the dream of C. R. Andrews (the son of the second Thomas) was fulfilled, the forge was reopened as an industrial museum by Sheffield Trades Historical Society (now South Yorkshire Industrial History Society). From the mid-1960s the Honorary Curator of the forge for over 40 years was Ken Hawley, who was the driving force behind a team of volunteer workers who preserved and restored the forge into its present condition – work that was recognised when he was appointed MBE in 1998.

== Heritage designations ==
The whole of the site is a Scheduled Monument and the main forge is a Grade I listed building. Top Forge Cottage, and two other cottages south of the forge, are listed separately at Grade II.

== See also ==
- Grade I listed buildings in South Yorkshire
- Listed buildings in Hunshelf
