= Portillo moment =

1997 declaration of a UK electoral result

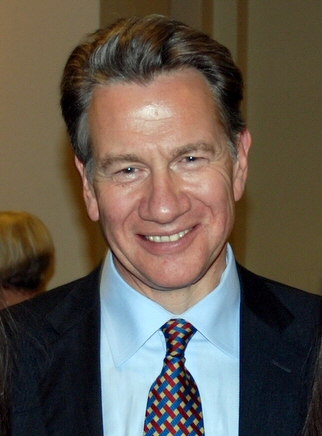
Michael Portillo, the namesake of the scenario, who lost his safe seat of Enfield Southgate in 1997

The Portillo moment was the declaration of the result for the Enfield Southgate constituency in the 1997 general election, at 3:01 a.m. on 2 May 1997. The Labour Party candidate, Stephen Twigg, defeated the sitting MP, Conservative cabinet minister Michael Portillo. The result was perceived as a pivotal indication that the Conservatives would be voted out of office after 18 years and that Labour would win the election by a substantial majority.

The late-night declaration of the result became the subject of the question "Were you still up for Portillo?", asking whether a person had remained awake until after 3 am to see or hear the key general-election results. "Portillo moment" has become a metaphor for an indication of a sudden and significant change in political fortunes, particularly the unseating of a leading MP (especially a cabinet minister) at a general election.

== Background ==
Michael Portillo was first elected to the House of Commons to represent Enfield Southgate at a by-election in 1984. The constituency included largely suburban areas in the west of the London Borough of Enfield. Portillo retained the seat at the 1987 general election and won with a comfortable majority of 15,563 in the 1992 general election.

By 1997, Portillo was Secretary of State for Defence in the Conservative government. He had developed a reputation as one of the leading lights of the right wing of the Conservative Party and was considered a possible candidate to follow John Major as party leader following the 1997 general election. The Labour Party candidate, Stephen Twigg – 30 years old, openly gay and relatively unknown – was considered unlikely to be able to unseat Portillo even in the Labour-leaning national environment. They had previously met when Portillo addressed Twigg's school during the latter's schooldays.

The Conservatives held a small majority in the House of Commons following the 1992 general election and remained in power for almost the maximum possible five years as their majority was gradually reduced at successive by-elections. Coming into the 1997 general election, Labour had held a substantial lead in the national polls for a considerable time, but Portillo's seat was still considered safe. However, a poll in The Observer newspaper the Sunday before the election showed that Portillo held a lead of only three percentage points.

After the polls had closed but before the result was formally announced, Portillo was interviewed live by Jeremy Paxman on BBC Television. By that stage, exit poll results had been revealed and predicted a Labour landslide nationally, and Portillo was privately aware of his possible defeat, although this was unknown to the public, who right up to the result were still expecting Portillo to be the next Tory leader. Portillo dismissed the national exit poll but struggled to answer Paxman's question, "Are we seeing the end of the Conservative Party as a credible force in British politics?"

At the local election headquarters, Portillo said, "Everyone around me, including the Labour workers, behaved towards me as though I'd been bereaved. They looked apologetic. I know I was a national figure of hate for Labour but you can only hate at a distance. The people in that room were Labour councillors that I'd worked with and liked. All evening, they treated me with courtesy and consideration."

Twigg and the other candidates also knew the results shortly before the formal announcement. Twigg was shocked but determined to keep a neutral expression during the announcement to maintain viewers' excitement to the last moment.

The result was read out, showing that Twigg had won 20,570 votes against Portillo's 19,137 and thus had been elected MP. Portillo remarked in later interviews that he had regarded his defeat as a blessing, since it eliminated him from the expected Tory leadership contest to replace John Major, and that he had no desire to lead a rump party, which would probably be in opposition for at least two more parliamentary cycles.

== Aftermath ==
The result in Enfield Southgate represented a 17.4% swing to Labour. Nationally Labour won a landslide victory with a parliamentary majority of 179 seats. Other prominent Conservatives to lose their seats included Foreign Secretary Malcolm Rifkind, Trade Secretary Ian Lang, Chief Secretary to the Treasury William Waldegrave, Secretary of State for Scotland Michael Forsyth and former ministers Edwina Currie, Norman Lamont, David Mellor and Neil Hamilton.

Twigg retained his seat in the 2001 election but lost it to the Conservative David Burrowes in the 2005 election. He returned to the House of Commons in the 2010 election as MP for the safe Labour seat of Liverpool West Derby, which he held until standing down at the 2019 election, having served a total of more than 17 years in Parliament, almost exactly the same as Portillo's combined service.

After losing Enfield Southgate in 1997, Portillo returned to the House of Commons in 1999, winning the by-election for Kensington and Chelsea following the death of Alan Clark. He served in the Shadow Cabinet of William Hague as Deputy Leader and Shadow Chancellor and stood as a candidate to become leader of the Conservative Party following the 2001 general election. He left the House of Commons at the 2005 general election.

== Legacy ==
In his acceptance speech, Twigg announced "there is no such thing as a no-go area for the Labour Party". Portillo was widely praised for his magnanimous response in his concession speech. Earlier that night, David Mellor had lost his seat at Putney, and was at the centre of a bad-tempered showdown with the Referendum Party leader, Sir James Goldsmith during his concession speech Portillo was determined to lose with as much dignity as he could muster.

=== Cultural impact ===
The public rejection of Portillo came to symbolise the loss of the election, and continues to be referred to as the "Portillo moment". Following the 1997 election, people asked each other "Were you up for Portillo?", a question echoed in the title of a book published by Brian Cathcart in October 1997, which recounts the story of the election night from the point when polls closed at 10 pm on 1 May 1997, entitled "Were You Still Up for Portillo?" Portillo has joked that the moment was voted by Channel 4 viewers, and by Observer readers, as "their third favourite moment of the 20th century", one place ahead of the execution of President of Romania Nicolae Ceaușescu. A Channel 4 list, compiled in 1999, put the Portillo moment third, behind the Apollo 11 Moon landing and the release of Nelson Mandela, and one place ahead of the death of Diana, Princess of Wales.

== Subsequent Portillo moments ==
The term has become a metaphor for an indication of a sudden and significant change in political fortunes – particularly when a prominent political figure loses an election unexpectedly. In 2006, it was feared that changes to the voting legislation, requiring verification of postal votes, could end the chance of a "Portillo moment" by delaying the declaration of results on election night, but this did not happen.

=== 2005 ===
Defeats in the 2005 election which were described as Portillo moments included:

- Oona King, the incumbent Labour MP for Bethnal Green and Bow, lost her seat in a shock defeat to former Labour MP George Galloway, after he ran for the Respect Party on an anti-war platform which attracted the support of local Muslims in a backlash against the Labour government's invasion of Iraq in 2003.
- David Trimble, leader of the Ulster Unionist Party and former First Minister of Northern Ireland, lost his Upper Bann seat to David Simpson of the Democratic Unionist Party.

=== 2015 ===
The 2015 election saw the defeat of a number of sitting cabinet ministers, due to a collapse in the support of the Liberal Democrats. The party lost 49 of their 57 seats, amid anger over their coalition with the Conservatives and reneging on a pledge to abolish tuition fees. Their landslide defeat has been compared to the elections of 1945 and 1997. The following were described as Portillo moments:

- Vince Cable, Secretary of State for Business, Innovation and Skills and later leader of the Liberal Democrats.
- Ed Davey, Secretary of State for Energy and Climate Change and later leader of the Liberal Democrats.
- Danny Alexander, Chief Secretary to the Treasury and Liberal Democrat MP.
- Ed Balls, Labour Shadow chancellor and former Secretary of State for Schools. The Conservatives had previously targeted his seat in 2010, but he had retained it.
- Douglas Alexander, Labour Shadow Foreign Secretary and former Transport Secretary, defeated in his Paisley and Renfrewshire South seat by the SNP candidate Mhairi Black, who went on to be Baby of the House

=== 2017 ===
The 2017 election saw the defeat of several sitting junior ministers and also some senior figures in Scotland, with Labour making unexpected gains against the Conservatives in England while the Scottish Conservatives made gains against the Scottish National Party (SNP) in Scotland. Defeats from the election that were described as Portillo moments included:

- Nick Clegg, former Deputy Prime Minister and former leader of the Liberal Democrats, lost his Sheffield Hallam seat to Jared O'Mara of the Labour Party.
- Alex Salmond, former First Minister of Scotland and former leader of the SNP, lost Gordon to the Scottish Conservatives, in what was described as the election's Portillo moment in Scotland.
- Angus Robertson, deputy leader of the SNP and the party's leader in the House of Commons, lost Moray to future Scottish Conservative leader Douglas Ross. His defeat had also been described as Scotland's Portillo moment in the election, before it was overshadowed by the defeat of Salmond later in the night.

=== 2019 ===
- Jo Swinson, Liberal Democrat leader, lost her East Dunbartonshire constituency to the SNP in 2019.
- Zac Goldsmith, environment minister, lost his seat to the Liberal Democrats. His loss came despite there being a landslide Conservative victory nationally. Boris Johnson granted him a peerage shortly after the election, which allowed him to continue in his role as environment minister despite losing his seat in parliament. The move was criticised by some as undemocratic.

=== 2024 ===
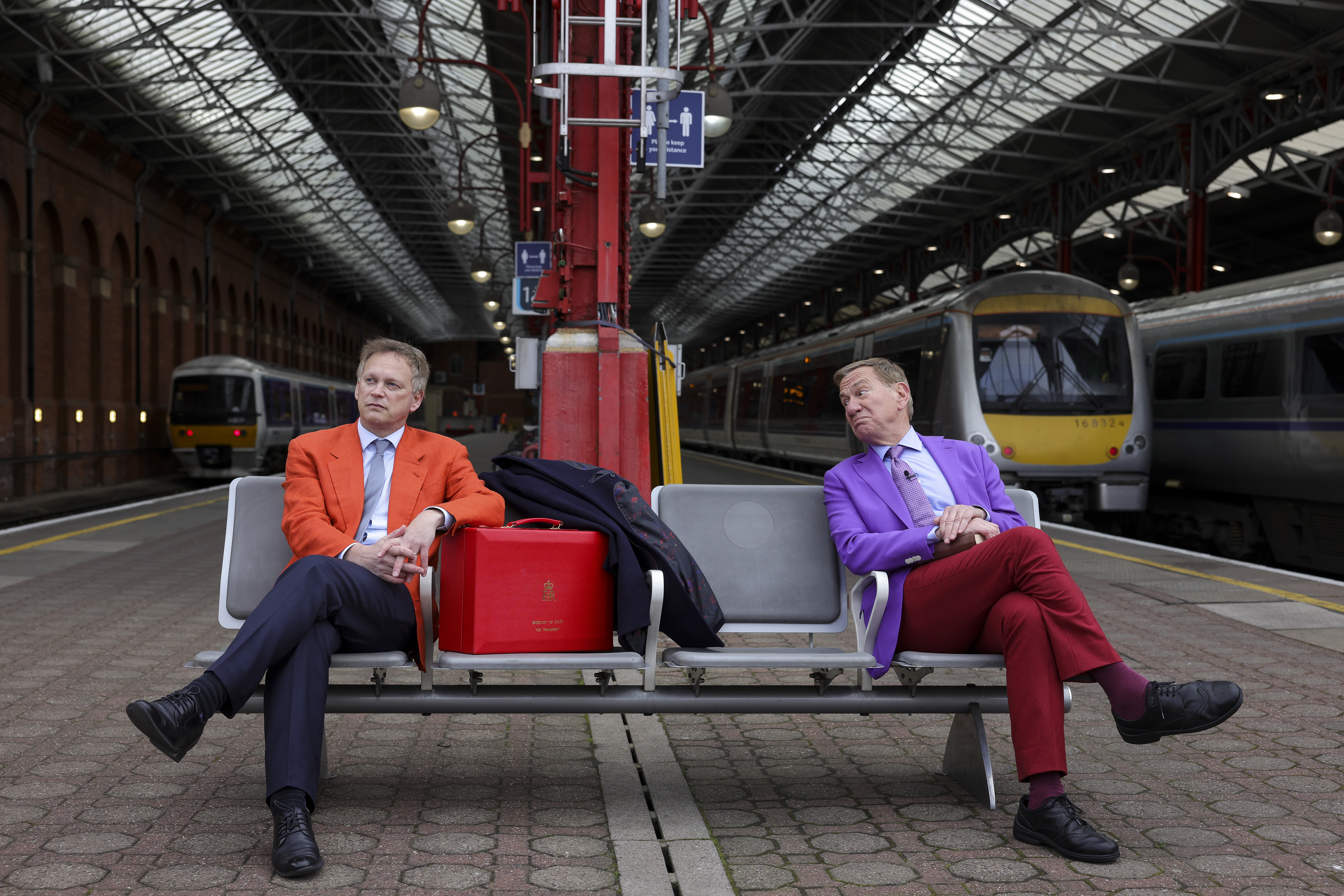
Grant Shapps sitting with Michael Portillo. Shapps' own defeat in 2024 was described as a Portillo moment.

The 2024 general election was the first time since 1997 that Labour ousted a Conservative government, and was a landslide victory of a similar margin. Twelve cabinet ministers lost their seats, and a number of Conservative figures stood down before the election to avoid their own Portillo moments. It was the highest number of sitting ministers ever to be defeated in a single election. Defeats from that election that were also described as Portillo moments include the following:

- Liz Truss, former Prime Minister, had a shock defeat in South West Norfolk. She lost to Labour's Terry Jermy on a record-breaking swing of 26 percent, which reversed a 26,000-vote majority. In the wake of her loss, the BBC has suggested that "Truss moment" may replace "Portillo moment" as the term for a sudden political defeat. It was also the first time in 90 years that a former prime minister had lost their seat (rather than stepping down).
- Jacob Rees-Mogg, former cabinet minister, lost North East Somerset and Hanham to Labour's Dan Norris. Greater Manchester mayor (and future Prime Minister) Andy Burnham, a panellist for Sky News' coverage, called this a Portillo moment that came shortly after Labour reached the 326 seats needed for a majority.
- Penny Mordaunt, leader of the Commons, lost her Portsmouth North seat on an 18% swing. Mordaunt's ousting had echoes of that of Portillo in 1997 in that she had been expected to enter the anticipated leadership contest after the election and had previously been seen as "the future of the Conservative Party". Her defeat ruled her out of the contest.
- Gillian Keegan, education secretary, was one of the first ministers to be defeated on election night, in Chichester on a massive swing of 31%, which had been a Conservative area for 100 years. The Liberal Democrats attributed her defeat to the sewage crisis, which was an issue for Chichester Harbour.
- Mark Harper, transport secretary, was defeated by Labour candidate Matt Bishop in Forest of Dean. Bishop had received an endorsement from the National Union of Rail, Maritime and Transport Workers shortly before the election. The group had been specifically campaigning against Harper due to his failure to negotiate amid the ongoing industrial action. Harper had not spoken to the union since December 2022.
- Jonathan Ashworth, Shadow Paymaster General, lost his seat in an upset to independent candidate Shockat Adam. The Ashworth unseating was said to represent the fragmentation of UK politics.
- Thangam Debbonaire, Shadow Secretary of State for Culture, Media and Sport, lost her seat to Green Party leader Carla Denyer. Debbonaire later stated she was expecting to lose her seat as early as November 2023.

=== 2026 ===
Whilst there was no general election in 2026, the 2026 Senedd election had numerous Portillo moments.

- Eluned Morgan, then First Minister of Wales, lost her seat in the Ceredigion Penfro constituency. Labour had 7% of the vote share, with Plaid Cymru on 36%, returning three members of the Senedd, Reform UK Wales on 26%, returning two members, and the Welsh Conservatives on 17%, returning one member. This was the first time that any serving leader of a government in the United Kingdom lost their seat.
- Hannah Blythyn, former Minister for Social Partnership, lost her seat in Clwyd.
- Jack Sargeant, then Minister for Culture, Skills and Social Partnership, lost his seat in Fflint Wrecsam.
- Alun Davies, who occupied many roles in the Welsh Government throughout the 2010s, lost his seat in Blaenau Gwent Caerffili Rhymni.

== See also ==
- Electoral history of Michael Portillo
- Enfield Southgate in the 1997 general election
- South West Norfolk in the 2024 United Kingdom general election
