= Christian Peoples Alliance =

British political party

- Abbreviation: CPA
- Leader: Sidney Cordle
- Founded: 1999; 27 years ago
- Headquarters: 13 Westmill Road, Hitchin, Hertfordshire, SG5 2SB
- Ideology: Christian right; Christian democracy; Social conservatism; Euroscepticism
- Political position: Right-wing
- Religion: Christianity
- European affiliation: European Christian Political Party
- Colours: Violet

Website
- www.cpaparty.net

The Christian Peoples Alliance (CPA) is a minor Christian right political party in the United Kingdom. The party was founded in its present form in 1999, having grown out of a cross-party advocacy group called the Movement for Christian Democracy. The first leader of the party was Ram Gidoomal; Alan Craig took over from him in 2004 and resigned in 2012. He was replaced by Sidney Cordle, the party's current leader.

== History ==
=== Movement for Christian Democracy ===
The beginnings of the party can be traced to the Movement for Christian Democracy (MCD), a group founded in 1990 with the aim to combat rising secularism within the United Kingdom. The three founding members were David Alton, Derek Enright and Ken Hargreaves, who were Members of Parliament representing the Liberal Democrat, Labour and Conservative parties respectively. Though political parties with explicitly Christian aims and values had been previously established within the United Kingdom, such as the Protestant Unionist Party (PUP) in Northern Ireland, the MCD, unlike the PUP, claimed to represent both Protestants and Catholics on a nationwide, rather than regional, basis.

The MCD existed as a cross-party advocacy group and never became a political party. However, many of its members sought to form the CPA; the movement's chairman, Alan Storkey, and its vice-chairman, David Campanale, formed the CPA in 1999 following a consultation of MCD members. In the 1997 general election Storkey stood as a Christian Democrat in Enfield Southgate.

=== Formation of the Christian Peoples Alliance ===
Following the devolution of the Scottish Parliament and the Welsh Assembly, elements of proportional representation at a local government level saw the party gain confidence. In 2000, Ram Gidoomal, a convert from Hinduism to Christianity, became the party's leader.

Gidoomal stood for election in the 2000 London mayoral election, gaining 98,549 votes and finishing fifth, ahead of the Green Party in first preference votes. The party campaigned on job opportunities for Londoners, amongst other policies. In November that year, a candidate supported by the Christian Peoples Alliance stood at the Preston by-election, finishing seventh.

Following this, the party continued campaigning in London, mostly in working class areas, such as Canning Town in Newham. In 2002, Alan Craig became the first Christian Democrat to be elected in Britain, as a member of Newham London Borough Council.

=== Craig leadership ===
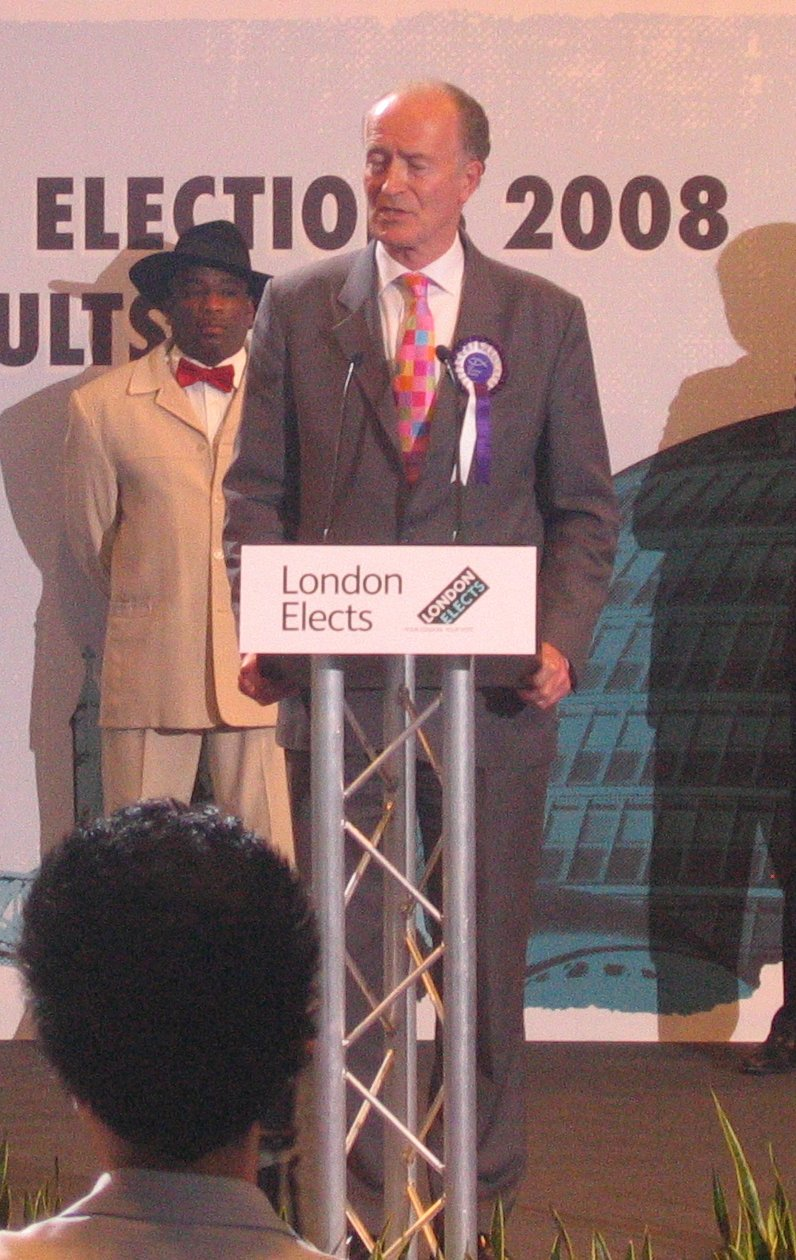
Alan Craig standing for London mayor in 2008.

After the 2004 London mayoral election, Gidoomal stepped down as party leader to be succeeded by Craig. The party contested the 2005 general election with little electoral success, though a "blind candidating" contest run by the BBC's Newsnight programme saw members of the public, unaware of the party of each contestant speaking, place the party's manifesto and policies second.

In 2006, The party won two more council seats in Canning Town. Later that year, Cardinal Keith O'Brien and Bishop Philip Tartaglia attended the party conference in Glasgow prior to the Scottish Parliament elections. Bishop Tartaglia gave a speech opening the conference in which he praised a number of party policies. In the following year, the party had two members elected at parish council level for Aston cum Aughton in the Metropolitan Borough of Rotherham.

In January 2008, Craig defended Anglican Bishop Michael Nazir-Ali, following his comments in the Telegraph that "Islamic extremism was creating 'no-go areas' for people of a different faith." Craig described the bishop as "courageous" for raising the matter.

As part of a party pact with the Christian Party, Craig stood for the London mayoral election in 2008 as "The Christian Choice", gaining almost 3% of the vote. This was followed with 249,493 votes at the European Parliament election 2009, 1.6% of the total.

The party's 'Mayflower Declaration' laid out the party's values and policies, voicing its opposition to the prospect of the Iraq War, deeming it "illegal, unwise and immoral" — a position by which it has stood.

In 2011, Craig was criticised for comparing gay rights activists to Nazis in the Church of England Newspaper.

Craig resigned as leader in October 2012; he later joined the UK Independence Party (UKIP).

=== Abbey Hills Mosque ===
The CPA campaigned against the building of the Abbey Mills Mosque in West Ham, planned to have been built by a sect of Islam which the CPA claimed was a "radical sect". The party's broadcast in relation to the planning was censored on both the BBC and on ITV, leading to the CPA taking unsuccessful legal action. A 23-year-old man from Stevenage posted a death threat on YouTube in response to the group's opposition to the mosque's construction. The party claimed the planned mosque was an "unwanted landmark", stating its belief that the construction would "undermine community cohesion". A petition on the official Downing Street website to prevent the mosque's construction gained more than 255,000 signatures, claiming that the mosque would "cause terrible violence".

=== Targeting of Stella Creasy ===
In November 2019, during the general election campaign, it was reported that CPA would focus on opposing Stella Creasy in her Walthamstow constituency. Creasy had that summer led successful attempts to decriminalise abortion in Northern Ireland.

The CPA campaign followed another in October that year by the Center for Bio-Ethical Reform, an anti-abortion group. The CBR campaign led to police passing a file to the Crown Prosecution Service to consider whether it constituted harassment.

The CPA came last with 0.5% of the vote.

== Organisation ==
Annual accounts submitted to the Electoral Commission show an income of £11,000 for 2013.

=== Leadership ===
Year	Name	Period	Time in office	Deputy leader/s
2000	Ram Gidoomal	2000 – 2004	4 years	
2004	Alan Craig	2004 – 2012	8 years	
2012	Sidney Cordle	1 September 2012 – present	incumbent	Malcolm Martin (5 November 2016-

=== International affiliation ===
Since 2007, the party has been affiliated to the European Christian Political Party, an association of Christian Democrat parties, think tanks and politicians across Europe.

== Ideology ==
In 2000 and 2004 in London, it put inner-city regeneration and fighting discrimination, as its top policy priorities.

The CPA has opposed the reclassification of cannabis.

When Craig became leader he introduced policies in favour of linking Christianity to the European Union Constitution, building more church schools and supporting 5th century Christian morality. He led campaigns backing the UNISON steward at Newham Council who faced disciplinary action; against plans to build London's large casino in Newham, against the Excel Arms Fair; against what he claims are Labour's plans to move local families out of Canning Town in support of yuppie housing. Craig has also campaigned against proposals to demolish parts of Queen Street Market in favour of "non-invasive refurbishment" environment.

=== Same-sex marriage ===
The party was involved in the campaign against the Marriage (Same Sex Couples) Act 2013 with its leader Sid Cordle speaking at a rally in Trafalgar Square. While the debates were taking place he spoke at a rally outside Westminster.

In May 2014, during the EU elections, under questioning from Andrew Neil on the BBC Daily Politics programme Cordle said that it was possible that recent storms in the UK could have been caused by God, saying, "I think all Christians believe that God does, and can do, things with nature. A lot of Christians believe God is angry over 'gay marriage' and God can show that anger if he wants to."

In May 2017, on the Daily Politics programme, Cordle was accused of "embarrassing" himself and was described as a "bigot" by the journalist Owen Jones after claiming that marriage's sole purpose was the procreation of children. The presenter, Jo Coburn, was forced to ask Cordle to allow Jones to speak on several occasions, but Cordle accused Jones of being "insulting" and claimed that Coburn's reluctance to allow him to respond to Jones was "fake news".

=== Economic and European policy ===
The Christian Peoples Alliance rejects the class struggle doctrine and supports a mixed market economy, with an emphasis on the community, social solidarity, support for social welfare provision and some regulation of market forces. The central theme is social justice, responsible charity and an emphasis on "people before profit". Within the Mayflower Declaration, the party sets out its goals and desires as providing resources to discourage economic dependency and promote gainful employment. It also supports a holistic approach to care, which moves beyond mere financial assistance, as well as help for those in danger of being pushed to the margins of society, like the homeless and disabled.

The Mayflower Declaration was updated and reprinted in early 2013 just after Cordle became leader. It now has a new introduction and at the back the policy on Europe was changed from support for the EU to "while we are members of the European Union to work with fellow Christians to seek to bring about moral and democratic reform". It subsequently went further and in its 2014 European manifesto said it wanted a referendum on the EU and that if a referendum was held it would support leaving the EU.

== Election results ==
The party has had candidates elected at local government elections. In Newham London Borough Council, Alan Craig was a councillor (2002-2010), as were Simeon Ademolake (2006–2010) and Denise Stafford (2006–2010). Paul Martin and David Gee were elected to Aston-cum-Aughton Parish Council (2007–2009).

The party has contested a number of seats for the UK Parliament.

=== House of Commons ===
General election	Candidates	Total votes	% of overall vote	Average vote per candidate	Seats won	Rank
2005	9	3,291▲	0.01%▲	366	0	29
2010	17	6,276 ▲	0.02% ▲	369	0	25
2015	17	3,260▼	0.01% ▼	192	0	26
2017	31	5,869 ▲	0.02% ▲	189	0	15
2019	27	6,486 ▲	0.02% ▲	240	0	18
2024	22	5,604 ▼	0.02% ▼	255	0	32

The party contested nine by-elections after 2017.

Date of election	Constituency	Candidate	Votes	%	Position
23 February 2017	Stoke-on-Trent Central	Godfrey Davies	109	0.5	9/10
14 June 2018	Lewisham East	Maureen Martin	168	0.8	8/14
6 June 2019	Peterborough	Tom Rodgers	162	0.5	7/15
1 July 2021	Batley and Spen	Paul Bickerdike	102	0.3	10/16
3 March 2022	Birmingham Erdington	Mel Mbondiah	79	0.5	8/12
23 June 2022	Wakefield	Paul Bickerdike	144	0.5	11/15
20 July 2023	Somerton and Frome	Lorna Corke	256	0.7	8/8
20 July 2023	Uxbridge and South Ruislip	Enomfon Ntefon	78	0.3	13/17
19 October 2023	Mid Bedfordshire	Sid Cordle	101	0.2	9/13

=== London Assembly ===
The party has consistently contested elections to the London Assembly but failed to gain any seats.

election year	Constituency votes	% of constituency vote	List votes	% of list vote	Seats won	Rank
2000	-	-	55,192▲	3.3%▲	0 / 25	5
2004	43,322▲	2.4%▲	54,914 ▼	2.9% ▼	0 / 25	8
2008^{†}	65,357▲	2.7%▲	70,294▲	2.9%	0 / 25	6
2012	-	-	38,758▼	1.8% ▼	0 / 25	7
2016	-	-	27,172 ▼	1.0% ▼	0 / 25	9
2021	-	-	28,878 ▲	1.1% ▲	0 / 25	8
2024	-	-	26,798 ▼	1.1%	0 / 25	9

† In 2008 the CPA fielded Joint-ticket candidates with the Christian Party, standing as "Christian Choice"

== See also ==
- Christian Concern
- Christian Institute
- Christian Party
- Christianity and politics
- Jubilee Centre
- ProLife Alliance (1997–2004)

== Bibliography ==
- Bolton, Bill (2003). The Entrepreneur in Focus. Cengage Learning EMEA. ISBN 978-1-86152-918-3.
- Freston, Paul (2004). Protestant Political Parties. Ashgate Publishing. ISBN 0-7546-4062-0.
- Watts, Duncan (2007). Pressure groups. Edinburgh University Press. ISBN 978-0-7486-2439-3.
