= Enfield Southgate in the 1997 general election =

British election result

1997 United Kingdom general election in Enfield Southgate
- 1 May 1997

Enfield Southgate parliamentary seat
- Turnout: 70.6%
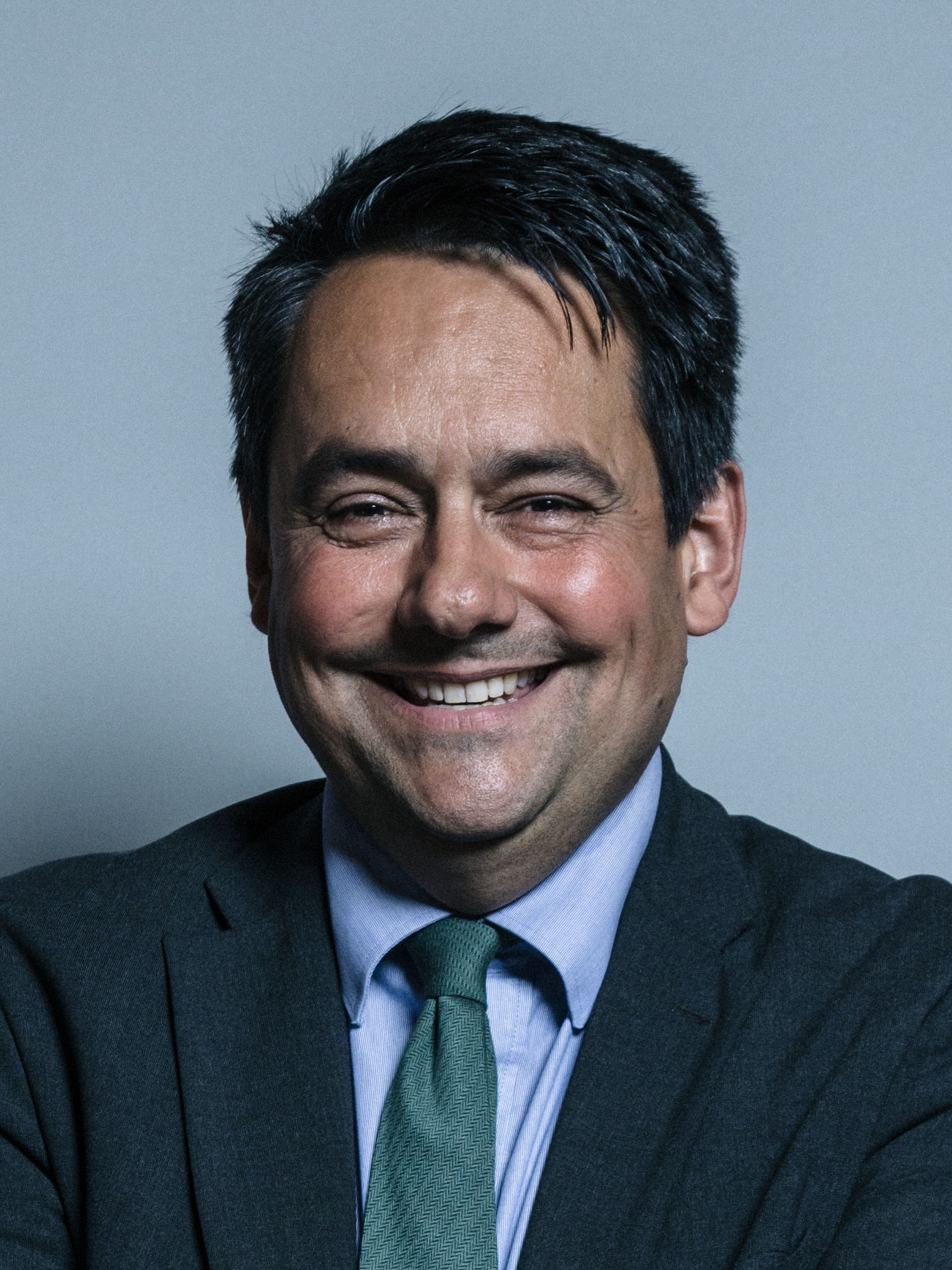

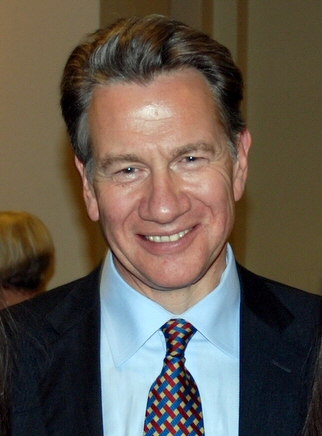

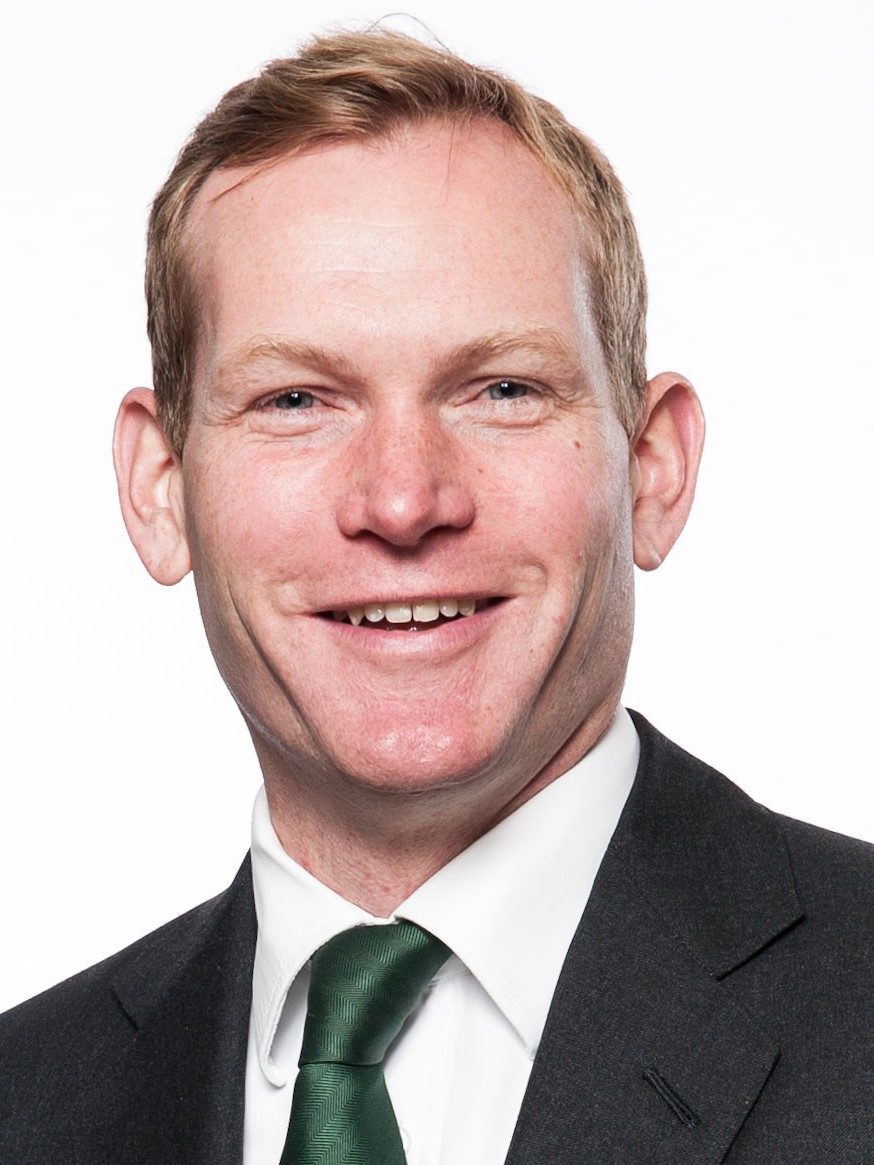
| | First party | Second party | Third party |
|---|---|---|---|
| Candidate | Stephen Twigg | Michael Portillo | Jeremy Browne |
| Party | Labour | Conservative | Liberal Democrats |
| Last election | 12,859 | 28,422 | 7,080 |
| Popular vote | 20,570 | 19,137 | 4,966 |
| Percentage | 44.2% | 41.1% | 10.7% |
| Swing | ▲18.0 pp | ▼16.8 pp | ▼3.8 pp |
MP before election
Michael Portillo
Conservative
Elected MP
Stephen Twigg
Labour

The constituency of Enfield Southgate returned a memorable result in the 1997 United Kingdom general election, when the seat's incumbent Member of Parliament, the Conservatives' Michael Portillo, lost to Labour's Stephen Twigg.

The result came as a shock to many politicians and commentators, and came to symbolise the extent of the Labour landslide victory under the leadership of Tony Blair.

== Background ==
There was a poll in The Observer newspaper on the weekend before the election which showed that Portillo held only a three-point lead in his hitherto safe seat. He had been widely expected to contest the Conservative leadership after the general election, which without a Commons seat he would be unable to do.

There was a memorable interview between Portillo and Newsnight host Jeremy Paxman on election night prior to the calling of the result in Enfield Southgate. Paxman decisively opened with the question "Michael Portillo, you gonna miss the Ministerial limo?", taken by many as a reference to the strong feeling going around on election night that he had lost his own seat – although it was claimed that it was simply a reference to Portillo losing his role and privileges as Secretary of State for Defence. Portillo was then stumped with the follow-up question: "Are we seeing the end of the Conservative Party as a credible force in British politics?" He has since admitted that he knew he had lost his seat by the time of the interview:

I saw that the exit poll was predicting a 160-seat majority for Labour. I thought, "When is Paxman going to ask me have I lost my seat?", because I deduced from that that I had. I then drove the car to my constituency and I knew I'd lost. But I also saw David Mellor. David Mellor had this really bad tempered spat with Jimmy Goldsmith [after the Putney election results had been announced]. I saw this and I thought if there's one thing I do when I lose, I'm going to lose with as much dignity as I can muster and not be like this David Mellor—Goldsmith thing.

== Declaration ==
The election result was announced live on national television. Enfield Mayor Patrick Cunneen was the returning officer. The candidates lined up on the stage at the Picketts Lock Leisure Centre in Enfield, while Cunneen read out the results, starting with these candidates:

- Jeremy Browne (Liberal Democrats) – 4,966 (10.7%)
- Nicholas Luard (Referendum Party) – 1,342 (2.9%)
- Andrew Malakouna (Mal – Voice of the People) – 229 (0.5%).

There was a brief ripple of laughter when Cunneen read out Portillo's given names – Michael Denzil Xavier – and then quiet as he announced Portillo's vote – 19,137 (41.1%) – followed by some applause. After announcing the results for Alan Storkey (Christian Democrat) – 289 (0.6%) – and waiting for brief cheers from Storkey's supporters to subside, Cunneen announced Twigg's name and then his vote – 20,570 votes (44.2%) – triggering sustained loud celebrations from Labour supporters.

Portillo's defeat represented a 17.4% swing to Labour. Although Twigg retained the seat with an increased majority in the 2001 general election, David Burrowes won it back for the Conservative Party in 2005 with a swing of 8.7%.

== 'Portillo moment' ==
The 1997 loss, symbolising the loss of the election by the Conservative Party, has been referred to as "the Portillo moment", and in the cliché "Were you up for Portillo?" (i.e., "Were you awake/did you see Portillo's result announced on television?"). Portillo himself commented, thirteen years later, that as a consequence "My name is now synonymous with eating a bucketload of shit in public."

== Result ==
General Election 1997: Enfield, Southgate
| Party | Candidate | Votes | % | ±% |
|---|---|---|---|---|
| Labour | Stephen Twigg | 20,570 | 44.2 | +18.0 |
| Conservative | Michael Portillo | 19,137 | 41.1 | −16.8 |
| Liberal Democrats | Jeremy Browne | 4,966 | 10.7 | −3.8 |
| Referendum | Nicholas Luard | 1,342 | 2.9 | N/A |
| Christian Democrat | Alan Storkey | 289 | 0.6 | N/A |
| Mal - Voice of the People | Andrew Malakouna | 229 | 0.5 | N/A |
| Majority | | 1,433 | 3.1 | |
| Turnout | | | 70.6 | |
| Labour gain from Conservative | | Swing | +17.4 | |
