= Stephen Twigg =

British Labour Co-op politician

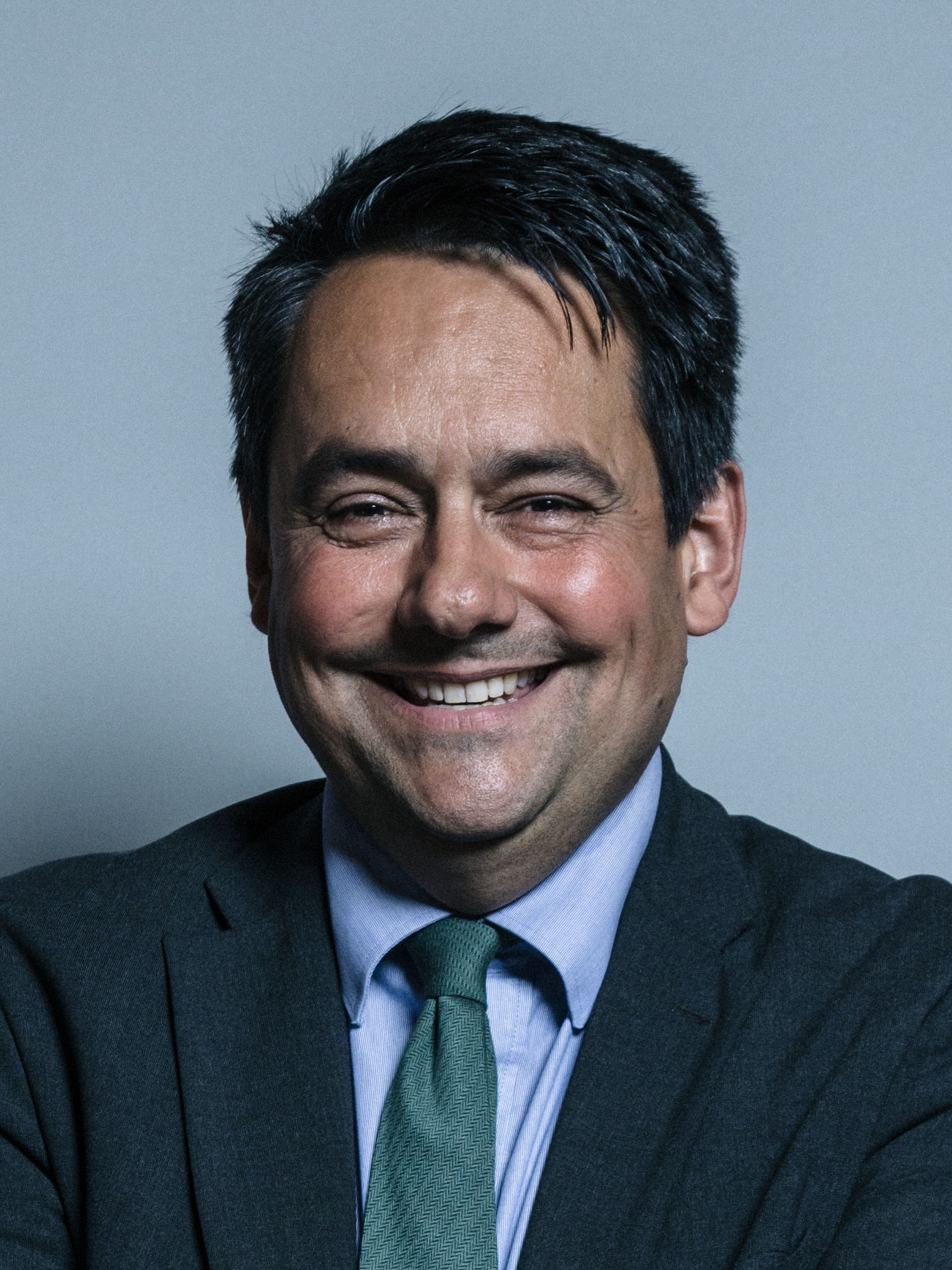
- Official portrait, 2017

8th Secretary-General of the Commonwealth Parliamentary Association
- Incumbent
- Assumed office August 2020
- Preceded by: Karimulla Akbar Khan

Chair of the International Development Committee
- In office 19 May 2015 – 6 November 2019
- Preceded by: Malcolm Bruce
- Succeeded by: Sarah Champion

Shadow Secretary of State for Education
- In office 7 October 2011 – 7 October 2013
- Leader: Ed Miliband
- Preceded by: Andy Burnham
- Succeeded by: Tristram Hunt

Minister of State for School Standards
- In office 16 December 2004 – 6 May 2005
- Prime Minister: Tony Blair
- Preceded by: David Miliband
- Succeeded by: Jacqui Smith

Deputy Leader of the House of Commons
- In office 11 June 2001 – 29 May 2002
- Prime Minister: Tony Blair
- Leader: Robin Cook
- Preceded by: Paddy Tipping
- Succeeded by: Ben Bradshaw

Parliamentary Secretary to the Privy Council Office
- In office 11 June 2001 – 30 May 2002
- Prime Minister: Tony Blair
- Preceded by: Paddy Tipping
- Succeeded by: Office abolished

Member of Parliament for Liverpool West Derby
- In office 6 May 2010 – 6 November 2019
- Preceded by: Bob Wareing
- Succeeded by: Ian Byrne

Member of Parliament for Enfield Southgate
- In office 1 May 1997 – 11 April 2005
- Preceded by: Michael Portillo
- Succeeded by: David Burrowes

44th President of the National Union of Students
- In office 1990–1992
- Preceded by: Maeve Sherlock
- Succeeded by: Lorna Fitzsimons

Personal details
- Born: 25 December 1966 (age 59) Enfield, London, England
- Party: Labour Co-op
- Education: Balliol College, Oxford

Stephen Twigg (born 25 December 1966) is a British Labour Co-op politician who has served as the 8th Secretary-General of the Commonwealth Parliamentary Association since August 2020. He served as Member of Parliament for Enfield Southgate from 1997 to 2005, and for Liverpool West Derby from 2010 to 2019.

He came to national prominence in 1997 by winning the seat of Defence Secretary Michael Portillo. Twigg was made the Minister of State for School Standards in 2004, a job he held until he lost his seat in 2005. He returned to parliament in 2010, after he was elected Member of Parliament for Liverpool West Derby when longtime MP Bob Wareing retired.

Following Ed Miliband's election to the Labour leadership, he made Twigg a Shadow Foreign Office Minister. In his October 2011 reshuffle, Miliband promoted Twigg to the post of Shadow Secretary of State for Education. However, on 7 October 2013 he was replaced in the reshuffle.

== Early life ==
He was born on Christmas Day 1966 in Enfield, London. Twigg was educated at Grange Park Primary School and Southgate School, a local comprehensive school, and at Balliol College, Oxford, where he studied philosophy, politics, and economics.

He became the youngest and first openly gay president of the National Union of Students in 1990, representing the National Organisation of Labour Students (NOLS). He was re-elected in 1991.

On leaving the NUS, he was elected as a councillor in the London Borough of Islington at a 1992 by-election, representing the Sussex ward until 1997, when he stood down following his election to parliament. During his tenure on the council, he became Chief Whip, and briefly Deputy Leader. Twigg's ward colleagues were both fellow future Labour MPs: Margaret Hodge and Meg Hillier. He also worked for the UK section of Amnesty International and then for the National Council for Voluntary Organisations.

== Political career ==
=== MP for Enfield Southgate (1997–2005) ===
In the 1997 election, he was elected to Parliament for Enfield Southgate, the constituency in which he had been born and raised, with a majority of 1,433. There had been a large 17.4% swing to him from his Conservative opponent, Michael Portillo. Portillo, a cabinet minister, had been widely tipped to be the next Tory leader, and the loss of his seat was one of the most unexpected results of the election. This event was dubbed the "Portillo moment" by the media.

A book about the election by Brian Cathcart was titled Were You Still Up for Portillo?. In the Royal Festival Hall in London, the scene of the Labour party celebrations that evening, the result elicited a massive cheer, as Portillo was widely loathed among Labour supporters. Twigg was forced to give up his role as general secretary of the Fabian Society following this unexpected victory in what had been regarded as a safe Conservative seat. It was also rare to have an openly gay British MP at that time.

In the 2001 election, Twigg held the seat with an increased majority of 5,546 over Conservative John Flack. Following the 2001 election, Twigg was appointed Parliamentary secretary to the Leader of the House of Commons, Robin Cook, and in 2002 became a junior minister in the Department for Education and Skills, from where he led the London Challenge initiative. In 2004, in the government changes following the resignation of David Blunkett, he was promoted to Minister of State for school standards.

Whilst an MP he served as chairman of two all-party parliamentary groups on epilepsy and youth issues. He is a former chairman of Labour Friends of Israel.

In the 2005 election, Twigg lost his seat to the Conservative Party candidate, David Burrowes, by a margin of 1,747 votes (a swing of 8.7%). During his concession speech, Twigg claimed that he would not be the last Labour MP for Enfield Southgate. He was proved correct in 2017, with the election of Bambos Charalambous, the Labour candidate, on 8 June that year.

=== Non-parliamentary career (2005–2010) ===
On 12 December 2005, Twigg was arrested in central London for being drunk and incapable in a public place and taken to Marylebone police station. He paid a £50 fixed penalty notice. Twigg commented "I had had a lot to drink and I think it [the police action] was sensible. I have no complaints whatsoever. I take full responsibility for my actions."

Twigg became chairman of Progress, an independent organisation for Labour party members, and director of the Foreign Policy Centre, a think tank which develops long-term multilateral approaches to global problems. Twigg worked at the Aegis Trust between 2005 and 2010, where he worked on their educational and campaigning work against genocide. He was also a patron of the Workers' Educational Association.

=== MP for Liverpool West Derby (2010–2019) ===
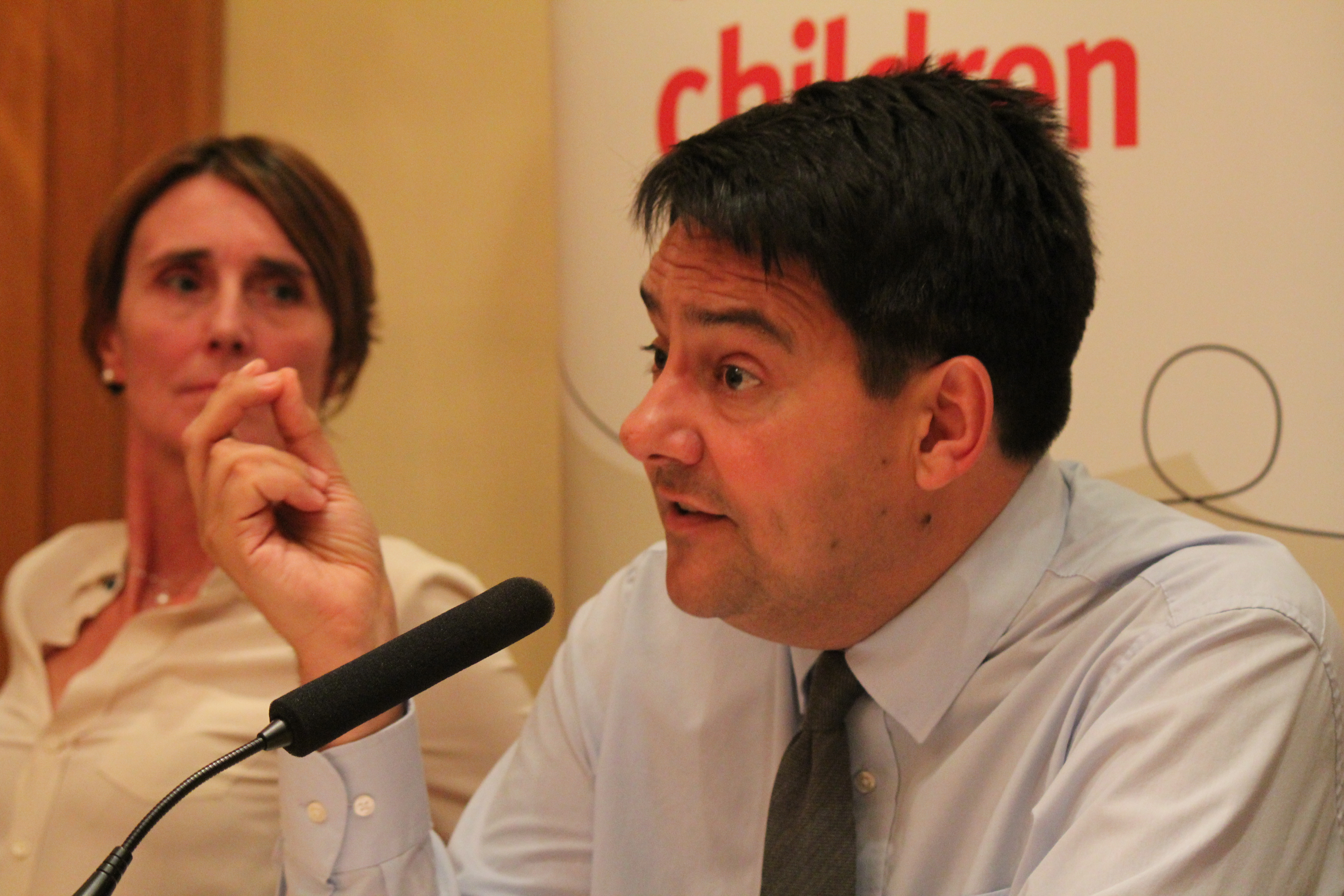
Twigg speaking in 2013

Twigg was selected as the Labour Co-operative candidate for the Liverpool West Derby constituency at the 2010 general election. He was elected with a majority of 18,467, garnering 64.1% of the vote.

In October 2010, he unsuccessfully contested the election for the Shadow Cabinet, coming in 36th out of the 49 candidates and winning 55 votes. He was subsequently appointed to the Labour front bench as a shadow minister in the Foreign Affairs team.

On 7 October 2011, he was appointed to the post of Shadow Secretary of State for Education, following the Shadow Cabinet reshuffle.

In the 2013 Shadow Cabinet reshuffle, Twigg lost his position of Shadow Education Secretary and was demoted to the Shadow Justice Team as Shadow Minister for Constitutional Reform.

On 19 June 2015, he was elected chairman of the International Development Select Committee. He supported Owen Smith in the 2016 Labour leadership election.

Twigg stood down at the 2019 general election and was succeeded by Ian Byrne, who retained the seat for Labour.

=== Post-parliamentary career ===
In August 2020, Twigg was appointed as the 8th Secretary-General of the Commonwealth Parliamentary Association (CPA). CPA represents Parliamentarians and parliamentary staff in around 180 Commonwealth parliaments and legislatures.

== Personal life ==
In August 2014, Twigg took on the Ice Bucket Challenge in aid of the Motor Neurone Disease Association.

Twigg is a Patron of Kinship Carers Liverpool and was previously a patron of the Merseyside Domestic Violence Services and a patron of the Merseyside Branch of the Motor Neurone Disease Association.

Parliament of the United Kingdom
Preceded by Michael Portillo	Member of Parliament for Enfield Southgate; 1997–2005	Succeeded by David Burrowes
Preceded by Bob Wareing	Member of Parliament for Liverpool West Derby; 2010–2019	Succeeded by Ian Byrne
Political offices
Preceded by Andy Burnham	Shadow Secretary of State for Education; 2011–2013	Succeeded by Tristram Hunt
Preceded by David Miliband	Minister of State for Schools; 2004–2005	Succeeded by Jacqui Smith
Preceded by Maeve Sherlock	President of the National Union of Students; 1990–1992	Succeeded by Lorna Fitzsimons
Party political offices
Preceded by Simon Crine	General Secretary of the Fabian Society; 1996–1997	Succeeded by Michael Jacobs
Preceded by Paul Richards	Chair of the Fabian Society; 2003–2004	Succeeded by Eric Joyce
Diplomatic posts
Preceded by Karimulla Akbar Khan	Secretary-General of the Commonwealth Parliamentary Association; 2020–present	Incumbent
