= Enfield Southgate =

UK Parliament constituency (1950–2024)

Coordinates: 51.647°N 0.122°W

- Former borough constituency for the House of Commons
- Boundary of Enfield Southgate in Greater London for the 2010 general election
- County: Greater London
- Electorate: 64,932 (December 2010)

1950–2024
- Created from: Wood Green
- Replaced by: Southgate and Wood Green (majority)

Enfield Southgate was a constituency in the House of Commons of the UK Parliament. It was created in 1950 as Southgate.

In the 1997 general election, it returned a memorable result when prominent Conservative Michael Portillo lost the previously safe seat to Stephen Twigg of the Labour Party.

Further to the completion of the 2023 review of Westminster constituencies, the majority of the seat was incorporated into the new constituency of Southgate and Wood Green.

== History ==
From 1950 to the 1983 general election, this constituency was known as Southgate. The prefix of the seat's London Borough was added to some parts of the legislation, but not others, in 1974. In 1984, Conservative MP Anthony Berry who represented Enfield Southgate was killed in the Brighton hotel bombing by the Provisional IRA, triggering a by-election.

It was regarded as a safe seat for the Conservative party, but it gained national attention in the 1997 general election when Michael Portillo, Secretary of State for Defence was unexpectedly defeated on a massive swing – the 'Portillo moment'. Portillo had been widely expected to contest the Conservative leadership and his defeat the media took to epitomise the Labour landslide victory. The victorious candidate, Stephen Twigg, increased his majority at the following election. In the 2005 general election, Twigg's majority was the largest overturned, with a swing of 8.7% to the Conservative candidate David Burrowes.

The 2015 result gave the seat the 60th most marginal majority of the Conservative Party's 331 seats by percentage of majority, with Labour gaining the seat in the 2017 general election on a substantial 9.7% swing. Enfield Southgate is one of five constituencies, the others being Croydon Central, Leeds North West, Peterborough and Reading East, which elected Labour MPs in 2017 having not done so since 2001. Charalambous became the first Labour MP for Enfield Southgate to be re-elected with a reduced share of the vote.

== Constituency profile ==
This constituency is located in the western parts of the London Borough of Enfield. Less out-of-work benefits (7.4%) are claimed here than the average for London (8.4%, which compares to 6.4% nationally in April 2021) and among those aged 18 to 24 the percentage is 10.4% in the seat during the COVID-19 pandemic. For the year 2020, 71.3% of employees fell into the top three occupation groups of nine assessed by government, which is above the London and national average. It has significant Jewish, Muslim and Cypriot communities. (Note: see 2011 census data release: Ethnicity)

In recent years, the south-eastern and southern wards of the constituency, including Bowes and Palmers Green have returned Labour local councillors, with some councillors also in Southgate Green and Winchmore Hill. These wards tend to give the bulk of the Labour vote. The remaining wards generally elect Conservative councillors.

To the north, the seat is semi-rural taking in Trent Park and the former campus of Middlesex University, and the Cockfosters terminus of the Piccadilly line, stretching into the wealthy Hadley Wood area. Some areas (smaller than local government wards) in the south of the constituency have middle rankings of deprivation when placed in a complete list of wards (such as the 2000 Index of Multiple Deprivation), however all other output areas lack any significant deprivation.

== Boundaries ==
Map of boundaries 2010–2024

1950–1974: The Municipal Borough of Southgate.

1974–1983: The London Borough of Enfield wards of Arnos, Bowes, Cockfosters, Grange, Highfield, Oakwood, Palmers Green, Southgate Green, West, and Winchmore Hill.

1983–2010: The London Borough of Enfield wards of Arnos, Bowes, Grange, Grovelands, Highfield, Merryhills, Oakwood, Palmers Green, Southgate Green, Trent, and Winchmore Hill.

2010–2024: The London Borough of Enfield wards of Bowes, Cockfosters, Grange, Palmers Green, Southgate, Southgate Green, and Winchmore Hill.

=== 2007 boundary review ===
Pre-2010 form of the seat, at centre. (Results shown: 2001)

The Boundary Commission for England recommended changes to the seat, which were approved and effective from 2010. Part of Highlands ward went to Enfield North; part of Grange ward came in reverse. Parts of Grange; Bowes; and Palmers Green wards were added to the seat from Edmonton. Part of wards: Bush Hill Park and Upper Edmonton supplemented Edmonton.

== Members of Parliament ==
Election	Member	Party	Notes
1950	Beverley Baxter	Conservative	Member for Wood Green (1935–1950)
1964	Anthony Berry	Conservative	Deputy Chief Government Whip (1983); Died 1984
1984 by-election	Michael Portillo	Conservative	Chief Secretary to the Treasury (1992–1994); Secretary of State for Employment (1994–1995); Secretary of State for Defence (1995–1997)
1997	Stephen Twigg	Labour	Minister of State for School Standards (2004–2005)
2005	David Burrowes	Conservative	
2017	Bambos Charalambous	Labour	
2023	Bambos Charalambous	Independent	
2024	Bambos Charalambous	Labour	

== Election results 2005–2024 ==
=== Elections in the 2010s ===
General election 2019: Enfield Southgate
Party	Candidate	Votes	%	±%
Labour	Bambos Charalambous	22,923	48.5	−3.2
Conservative	David Burrowes	18,473	39.1	−3.6
Liberal Democrats	Rob Wilson	4,344	9.2	+5.2
Green	Luke Balnave	1,042	2.2	+0.6
Brexit Party	Parag Shah	494	1.0	New
Majority		4,450	9.4	+0.4
Turnout		47,726	72.7	−1.4
Registered electors		65,055		
Labour hold		Swing	+0.2	

General election 2017: Enfield Southgate
Party	Candidate	Votes	%	±%
Labour	Bambos Charalambous	24,989	51.7	+12.7
Conservative	David Burrowes	20,634	42.7	−6.7
Liberal Democrats	Pippa Morgan	1,925	4.0	+0.7
Green	David Flint	780	1.6	−2.1
Majority		4,355	9.0	N/A
Turnout		48,328	74.1	+3.6
Registered electors		65,210		
Labour gain from Conservative		Swing	+9.7	

General election 2015: Enfield Southgate
Party	Candidate	Votes	%	±%
Conservative	David Burrowes	22,624	49.4	0.0
Labour	Bambos Charalambous	17,871	39.0	+6.8
UKIP	David Schofield	2,109	4.6	+3.5
Green	Jean Robertson-Molloy	1,690	3.7	+2.3
Liberal Democrats	Paul Smith	1,518	3.3	−10.5
Majority		4,753	10.4	−6.8
Turnout		45,812	70.5	+1.3
Registered electors		64,937		
Conservative hold		Swing	−3.4	

General election 2010: Enfield Southgate
Party	Candidate	Votes	%	±%
Conservative	David Burrowes	21,928	49.4	+5.7
Labour	Bambos Charalambous	14,302	32.2	−8.8
Liberal Democrats	Johar Khan	6,124	13.8	+2.7
Green	Peter Krakowiak	632	1.4	−1.4
UKIP	Bob Brock	505	1.1	−0.1
Independent	Asit Mukhopadhyay	391	0.9	New
Respect	Samad Billoo	174	0.4	New
English Democrat	Ben Weald	173	0.4	New
Independent	Mal 'the Warrior' Malakounides	88	0.2	New
Better Britain Party	Jeremy Sturgess	35	0.1	New
Majority		7,626	17.2	+13.1
Turnout		44,352	69.2	+5.7
Registered electors		64,139		–1.8
Conservative hold		Swing	+7.2	

2005 notional result
Party	Vote	%
Conservative	18,134	43.8
Labour	17,007	41.0
Liberal Democrats	4,611	11.1
Green	1,155	2.8
UKIP	526	1.3
Turnout	41,433	63.5
Electorate	65,275	

== Election results 1983–2005 ==
=== Elections in the 2000s ===
General election 2005: Enfield Southgate
Party	Candidate	Votes	%	±%
Conservative	David Burrowes	18,830	44.6	+6.0
Labour	Stephen Twigg	17,083	40.5	−11.3
Liberal Democrats	Ziz Kakoulakis	4,724	11.2	+4.2
Green	Trevor Doughty	1,083	2.6	+1.0
UKIP	Brian Hall	490	1.2	+0.5
Majority		1,747	4.1	N/A
Turnout		42,210	66.4	+2.9
Registered electors		63,720		
Conservative gain from Labour		Swing	+8.7	

General election 2001: Enfield Southgate
Party	Candidate	Votes	%	±%
Labour	Stephen Twigg	21,727	51.8	+7.6
Conservative	John Flack	16,181	38.6	−2.5
Liberal Democrats	Wayne Hoban	2,935	7.0	−3.7
Green	Elaine Graham-Leigh	662	1.6	New
UKIP	Roy Freshwater	298	0.7	New
Independent	Andrew Malakouna	105	0.3	−0.2
Majority		5,546	13.2	+10.1
Turnout		41,908	63.5	−7.1
Registered electors		65,957		
Labour hold		Swing	+5.1	

=== Elections in the 1990s ===
General election 1997: Enfield Southgate
Party	Candidate	Votes	%	±%
Labour	Stephen Twigg	20,570	44.2	+18.0
Conservative	Michael Portillo	19,137	41.1	−16.9
Liberal Democrats	Jeremy Browne	4,966	10.7	−3.8
Referendum	Nicholas Luard	1,342	2.9	New
Christian Democrat	Alan Storkey	289	0.6	New
Mal – Voice of the People	Andrew Malakouna	229	0.5	New
Majority		1,433	3.1	N/A
Turnout		46,533	70.6	−5.7
Registered electors		65,887		
Labour gain from Conservative		Swing	+17.4	

General election 1992: Enfield Southgate
Party	Candidate	Votes	%	±%
Conservative	Michael Portillo	28,422	58.0	−0.8
Labour	Karen Livney	12,859	26.2	+7.3
Liberal Democrats	Kevin Keane	7,080	11.2	−6.7
Green	Marghanita Hollands	696	1.4	0.0
Majority		15,563	31.8	−6.1
Turnout		49,057	76.3	+3.7
Registered electors		64,311		
Conservative hold		Swing	−4.1	

=== Elections in the 1980s ===
General election 1987: Enfield Southgate
Party	Candidate	Votes	%	±%
Conservative	Michael Portillo	28,445	58.8	+0.7
Liberal	Nick Harvey	10,100	20.9	−2.5
Labour	Allan Course	9,114	18.9	+1.0
Green	Stephen Rooney	696	1.4	New
Majority		18,345	37.9	+3.2
Turnout		48,355	72.6	+3.0
Registered electors		66,600		+1.7
Conservative hold		Swing	+1.6	

1984 Enfield Southgate by-election
Party	Candidate	Votes	%	±%
Conservative	Michael Portillo	16,684	49.6	−8.5
Liberal	Timothy Slack	11,973	35.6	+12.3
Labour	Peter Hamid	4,000	11.9	−6.0
Turkish Troops Out of Cyprus	Andreas Polydrou	687	2.0	New
Nationalist Party	James Kershaw	80	0.2	New
English National	Raymond Shenton	78	0.2	New
Abolish Greater London, Restore Middlesex	Iain Burgess	50	0.2	New
Captain Rainbow's Universal Party	George Weiss	48	0.1	New
Death off Roads: Freight on Rail	Helen Anscomb	45	0.1	New
Majority		4,711	14.0	–20.7
Turnout		33,645	50.6	–19.0
Registered electors		66,473		+1.6
Conservative hold		Swing	−10.4	

General election 1983: Enfield; Southgate
Party	Candidate	Votes	%	±%
Conservative	Anthony Berry	26,451	58.1	−3.0
Liberal	David Morgan	10,632	23.3	+9.5
Labour	Mary Honeyball	8,132	17.9	−5.4
BNP	M Braithwaite	318	0.7	New
Majority		15,819	34.7	−3.2
Turnout		45,533	69.6	−6.7
Registered electors		65,438		
Conservative hold		Swing	–6.3	

1979 notional result
Party	Vote	%
Conservative	29,606	61.1
Labour	11,240	23.2
Liberal	6,725	13.9
Others	857	1.8
Turnout	48,428	
Electorate		

== Election results 1974–1983 ==
=== Elections in the 1970s ===
General election 1979:Southgate
Party	Candidate	Votes	%	±%
Conservative	Anthony Berry	31,663	61.64	+7.74
Labour	Ian Wilson	11,584	22.55	−0.28
Liberal	Anthony Baker	7,223	14.06	−6.60
National Front	Royston Pert	895	1.74	−0.87
Majority		20,079	39.09	+8.02
Turnout		51,365	76.26	+8.55
Registered electors		67,355		–5.32
Conservative hold		Swing	+4.01	

General election October 1974:Southgate
Party	Candidate	Votes	%	±%
Conservative	Anthony Berry	25,888	53.90	+1.45
Labour	J P Sheppard	10,966	22.83	+2.77
Liberal	George Bridge	9,922	20.66	−4.65
National Front	B W Pell	1,255	2.61	+0.43
Majority		14,922	31.07	+3.92
Turnout		48,031	67.71	−9.82
Registered electors		70,935		+0.79
Conservative hold		Swing	–0.66	

General election February 1974:Southgate
Party	Candidate	Votes	%	±%
Conservative	Anthony Berry	28,620	52.45	–10.53
Liberal	George Bridge	13,806	25.30	+11.39
Labour	F Sealey	10,945	20.05	−3.05
National Front	B W Pell	1,192	2.18	New
Majority		14,454	26.67	−9.24
Turnout		54,563	77.53	+9.62
Registered electors		70,372		–2.3
Conservative hold		Swing	–10.97	

1970 notional result
Party	Vote	%
Conservative	30,800	63.0
Labour	11,300	23.1
Liberal	6,800	13.9
Turnout	48,900	67.9
Electorate	72,002	

== Election results 1950–1974 ==
=== Elections in the 1970s ===
General election 1970: Southgate
Party	Candidate	Votes	%	±%
Conservative	Anthony Berry	22,963	60.74	+7.27
Labour Co-op	Robert Brian Bastin	9,389	24.84	+0.23
Liberal	George Bridge	5,451	14.42	−7.50
Majority		13,574	35.90	+7.04
Turnout		37,803	67.61	+7.51
Registered electors		55,913		
Conservative hold		Swing		

=== Elections in the 1960s ===
General election 1966: Southgate
Party	Candidate	Votes	%	±%
Conservative	Anthony Berry	21,171	53.47	−1.28
Labour	Percy Sassoon Gourgey	9,743	24.61	+2.99
Liberal	George Bridge	8,679	21.92	−1.70
Majority		11,428	28.86	−2.27
Turnout		39,593	75.12	−1.27
Registered electors		52,705		
Conservative hold		Swing		

General election 1964: Southgate
Party	Candidate	Votes	%	±%
Conservative	Anthony Berry	22,251	54.75	−6.04
Liberal	George Bridge	9,600	23.62	+2.41
Labour	S. John Chapman	8,787	21.62	+3.62
Majority		12,651	31.13	−8.45
Turnout		40,638	76.39	−0.68
Registered electors		53,198		
Conservative hold		Swing		

=== Elections in the 1950s ===
General election 1959: Southgate
Party	Candidate	Votes	%	±%
Conservative	Beverley Baxter	25,704	60.79	−1.53
Liberal	George Bridge	8,968	21.21	+3.50
Labour	S. John Chapman	7,613	18.00	−1.97
Majority		16,736	39.58	−2.77
Turnout		42,285	77.07	−0.05
Registered electors		54,869		
Conservative hold		Swing		

General election 1955: Southgate
Party	Candidate	Votes	%	±%
Conservative	Beverley Baxter	26,794	62.32	+0.16
Labour	George Louis Caunt	8,584	19.97	−2.56
Liberal	George Bridge	7,614	17.71	+2.40
Majority		18,210	42.35	+2.72
Turnout		42,992	77.12	−7.0
Registered electors		55,745		
Conservative hold		Swing		

General election 1951: Southgate
Party	Candidate	Votes	%	±%
Conservative	Beverley Baxter	30,044	62.16	+1.06
Labour	Vera Dart	10,889	22.53	+0.33
Liberal	Edwin Malindine	7,402	15.31	−1.39
Majority		19,155	39.63	+0.73
Turnout		48,335	84.12	−2.28
Registered electors		57,462		
Conservative hold		Swing		

General election 1950: Southgate
Party	Candidate	Votes	%
Conservative	Beverley Baxter	30,302	61.1
Labour	Vera Dart	11,023	22.2
Liberal	Gershon Ellenbogen	8,286	16.7
Majority		19,279	38.9
Turnout		49,611	86.4
Registered electors		57,447	
Conservative win (new seat)			

=== Graphical representation ===
1992
	26.2%	11.2%	58.0%
G	Labour	Lib Dems	Conservative

1997
44.2%	10.7%	41.1%	2.9
Labour	Lib Dems	Conservative	Re

2001
	51.8%	7.0%	38.6%
G	Labour	Lib Dem	Conservative

2005
2.6	40.5%	11.2%	44.6%
G	Labour	Lib Dems	Conservative

2010
32.2%	13.8%		49.4%
Labour	Lib Dems	I	Conservative

2015
3.7%	39.0%	3.3	49.4%	4.6%
Gn	Labour	LD	Conservative	UKIP

2017
	51.7%	4.0%	42.7%
G	Labour	LD	Conservative

2019
	48.5%	9.2%	39.1%
G	Labour	LD	Conservative	B

== See also ==
- parliamentary constituencies in London
