= Elaine Storkey =

English philosopher, sociologist, and theologian

- Born: Elaine Lively; Wakefield, England
- Spouse: Alan Storkey (m. 1968)
- Children: Amos Storkey, Matthew Storkey, Caleb Storkey

Academic background
- Education: University of Wales, Aberystwyth; McMaster University
- Influences: H. Evan Runner

Academic work
- Discipline: Philosophy; sociology; theology
- School or tradition: Christian feminism; open evangelicalism
- Institutions: Oak Hill College; Open University; Wycliffe Hall, Oxford
- Website: elainestorkey.com

Elaine Storkey (née Lively;) is a British philosopher, sociologist, and theologian. She is known for her lecturing, writing and broadcasting.

== Early years and education ==
Storkey grew up in Ossett, Yorkshire, and was Head Girl at Ossett Grammar School (now Ossett Academy), whose former pupils included the novelist Stan Barstow, a friend of her parents, and the artist twins: Donald and Peter Heywood. She studied at the University of Wales, Aberystwyth, doing postgraduate work in philosophy at McMaster University, Hamilton, Ontario, Canada, and York University, England.

In 1968 she married Alan Storkey, an economist, writer and lecturer, and they have three sons and six grandchildren.

== Working life ==
After research on Ludwig Wittgenstein's work, Storkey's first academic post was in philosophy in Oxford University, as a tutor at Manchester College, Oxford.

She left Manchester College to join her husband on the faculty of the University of Stirling. She started broadcasting with the BBC in 1986, after they both returned from a period of lecturing at Calvin College, Michigan, and Covenant College, Tennessee, in the United States. She has since been involved in many documentaries, arts, news and current affairs programmes. She was a presenter on BBC Radio 4's Thought for the Today for more than 20 years and has written many scripts for the BBC World Service. One of her Thoughts took the Saudi Arabian judiciary to task after a brief World Service item reported that Saudi Arabia planned to hang a Christian Filipino preacher on Christmas Day. Her Thought became a news item throughout the day, was taken up by Amnesty International and the man was released on Christmas Eve. Storkey has continued to broadcast for the last twenty years with BBC Radio Ulster, especially Sunday Sequence, including covering for them the funeral of Queen Elizabeth II.

Elaine Storkey has authored several books, along with co-authoring texts for the Open University. These include What's Right with Feminism, The Search for Intimacy, Mary's Story, Mary's Song, Scars Across Humanity: Understanding and Overcoming Violence Against Women and Women in a Patriarchal World. Her most recent book is Meeting God in Matthew: a short commentary on Matthew's Gospel. * Her book Created or Constructed grew out of lectures given at the University of New South Wales in Australia. Over many years she wrote for The Independent for the Swedish newspaper Dagen and for the Church Times. During the 1990s she collaborated with Roman Catholic author and theologian Margaret Hebblethwaite, and they co-authored a book exploring Christian feminism from two different traditions. Their writings on women are widely used within the Roman Catholic as well as other churches. Storkey was also a close colleague of the American biblical scholar Catherine Clark Kroeger, whose obituary she wrote in July 2011.

After many years teaching and writing with the Open University and presenting radio and television documentaries on gender, race, and ethnicity with colleague Stuart Hall, Storkey succeeded John Stott as Executive Director of the London Institute for Contemporary Christianity (LICC) in 1991, a post she held until 1999. She contributed to Stott's obituary in 2011. She also taught at King's College London. In 1997 she became President of Tearfund, a Christian relief and development charity, and has since been involved in monitoring aid, relief and advocacy work in countries of the Global South. In 2010 she and her husband Alan became founder members of Restored, an organisation advocating against violence towards women.

Storkey was a member of the General Synod of the Church of England from 1987 to 2016, serving on the Archbishop's Rural Commission, the Cathedrals Commission and, from 2021-3, the Household and Families Commission. She was the C of E delegate to the Church of Scotland General Assembly and to the World Council of Churches where she was involved in dialogue with the Orthodox Churches for a number of years. She has served on many other boards and councils, including the Crown Nominations Commission, the environmental agency A Rocha, the global advocacy group Micah Challenge, and as Vice President of the University of Gloucestershire. She is currently President of Fulcrum, a Church of England think-tank. She holds a Lambeth DD degree an honorary PhD from the University of Gloucestershire, and is a Fellow of Aberystwyth University.

From 2003 to 2007, she was a colleague of Alister McGrath as Senior Research Fellow at Wycliffe Hall, Oxford. In 2007, 12 members of the academic staff resigned, critical of the governance of the college and its principal, Richard Turnbull. At an employment tribunal in 2008, the college admitted lack of compliance with employment law and was ordered to pay compensation. In 2024 the college issued a public apology to the academics it had wronged and held a service of lament. Storkey continues to teach on the Christian Mind course at Oxford University, and has been a lecturer with the Montgomery Trust since 2001. She became a member of High Table at Newnham College, Cambridge, in January 2008. From February 2009 to September 2012 she was Director of Education and Training for Church of England evangelists, in conjunction with York St John University. In the summer of 2009 she held a Templeton-Cambridge Fellowship in Journalism and was Chair of The Church and Media network from 2010 to 2012. Among the public lectures she has given recently are the Frumentius Lectures, in Addis Ababa, Ethiopia, the Annual Bernardo Lecture, the "Global Gender Lectures" for the Cymru Institute, the Oliver Lyseight Annual Memorial Lecture, lectures on "Creative Christianity in Popular Culture" at Dordt College, US, the All Saints Lecture, the Kuyper Lecture in Princeton USA, and lectures on film and theology. She has been a regular speaker at the Greenbelt Festival. A fuller list of lectures can be found on the author's webpage. Many lectures, including archived ones, are on video and available publicly on social media. She has been a member of the Emerging Markets Symposium, and The Power Shift Forum for Women in the World Economy. In 2025 she was made a Life Member of Newnham College SCR.

Storkey has lectured across the world, including in Haiti, India, Nepal, Turkey and Ethiopia, and is a prominent feminist evangelical. Her writings have brought a biblical perspective to the feminist movement. She is concerned to highlight the impact of climate change and global poverty, as well as of sexual violence, on women. She has visited many African countries and been involved in advocacy, with strong links to Heal Africa in the Democratic Republic of the Congo. Her book Scars Across Humanity: Understanding and Overcoming Violence Against Women was published in November 2015. The second edition, published by IVP Academic in the US in 2018, won the Christianity Today Book of the Year Award 2019, for Politics and Public Life.

== Awards and honours ==
Storkey was given a lifetime achievement award for services to women by the American group CBE in 2008, and in 2013 her alma mater, Aberystwyth University, honoured her with a University Fellowship. In April 2016 she received the Abraham Kuyper Prize from Princeton Theological Seminary, in recognition of her work as a scholar, writer and journalist.

== Published works ==
Books

- What's Right with Feminism, SPCK, 1985
- Mary's Story, Mary's Song, Harper-Collins, 1993
- Magnify the Lord, HarperCollins, 1996
- The Search for Intimacy, Hodder Headline, 1994
- Conversations on Christian Feminism, with Margaret Hebblethwaite, Harper-Collins, 1999
- Created or Constructed: The Great Gender Debate, Paternoster Press, 2000
- The Origins of Difference, Baker Book House, 2002
- Word on the Street, Old Hall Press, 2005
- Scars Across Humanity, SPCK, November 2015 revised 2018
- Women in a Patriarchal World, SPCK, April 2020
- Meeting God in Matthew, SPCK, 2022.

Other publications

- "The Production of Social Divisions", Social Sciences: A Foundation, Open University Press, 1985.
- "Sex and Sexuality in the Church", Mirror to the Church, Editor Monica Furlong, SPCK, 1986.
- Faith in the Countryside, Report of the Archbishops', Commission on Rural Areas, co-author, 1990
- "Modernity and Anthropology", in Philip Sampson, Vinay Samuel and Chris Sugden (eds), Faith and Modernity, Lynx, 1994
- "Dooyeweerd's Anthropology – The Male-Female Dimension", in Sander Griffioen, Bert M. Balk (eds), Christian Philosophy at the Close of the Twentieth Century, Assessment and Perspective, Uitgeverij kok Kampen, 1995
- "Sexuality and Spirituality", in David Torrance, Family, Sexuality and Spirituality, Hansel Press, 1997
- "A Commentary – New Testament Study Bible", with Catherine Kroeger and Mary Evans, CUP, 2002
- "Theology and Gender", in A Cambridge Companion to Evangelical Theology, CUP, 2008.
- "Religion and Sustainability in Global Perspective" in Sustainability in Crisis, edit Colin Bell, Wordpress 2013
