= Alan Storkey =

British economist, sociologist and artist

- Born: Alan James Storkey; 2 October 1943 (age 83); London
- Education: City of Norwich School
- Alma mater: Christ's College, Cambridge; London School of Economics; Vrije Universiteit (Ph.D.)
- Spouse: Elaine Storkey (m. 1968)
- Children: Amos Storkey, Matthew Storkey, Caleb Storkey
- Scientific career
- Fields: Christian Social Thought, Economics, sociology, militarism, war, disarmament, peace website = www.alanstorkey.com
- Workplaces: Stirling University; Worksop College; Calvin College; Oak Hill Theological College
- Doctoral advisor: Bob Goudzwaard

Alan James Storkey (born 2 October 1943) is a British economist, sociologist and artist known for his writing, lectures, and work on transport and the arms trade.

In 1968 he married Elaine Lively, a philosopher, sociologist and broadcaster.

== Education and academic posts ==
Alan Storkey was educated at the City of Norwich School, where he was school captain, and then at Christ's College, Cambridge where he studied economics. He did postgraduate work in sociology at the London School of Economics and a doctorate in economics (consumption theory) at the Vrije Universiteit, Amsterdam, studying under Bob Goudzwaard. His first academic post was in sociology at Stirling University from where he went on to direct the Shaftesbury Project. Having taught economics and politics at Worksop College, he became a member of the Research Scholars in Economics team at Calvin College, Grand Rapids, Michigan, United States, in the early 1980s. He was Director of Studies for 20 years at Oak Hill Theological College, London, until 2003, responsible for the academic programme with Middlesex University. Since then he has lived in Cambridge and has done mainly research, writing and lecturing on the economics and ethics of militarism.

== Publications ==
Storkey is an author of several books, including:

- A Christian Social Perspective in 1979
- Transforming Economics
- The Meanings of Love
- Epistemological Foundations in Consumption Theory
- Marriage and Its Modern Crisis
- Jesus and Politics: Confronting the Powers
- Beneath the Surface of the Kosovo War: Arms Trade and the Peace of Nations
- War or Peace: The Long Failure of Western Arms
- 'It is time to wage war against war'
- Militarism has failed

He has contributed to published symposia and columns in national newspapers and was a regular columnist for the Church Times, the Church of England Newspaper and Premier magazine Christianity. Marriage and Its Modern Crisis was written in response to a working party report from the Church of England. His book Jesus and Politics was featured at the Jubilee Conference in Pittsburgh.

In the 1990s Storkey was chair of the Movement for Christian Democracy and in 1997 unsuccessfully contested the parliamentary seat of Enfield Southgate.

He has given submissions to Government Enquiries into Transport on a motorway-based coach system and has been a member of a campaigning group on greener transport. His work on transport is referenced in George Monbiot's book Heat.

== Art work ==
As an artist, Storkey paints landscapes and portraits. He exhibits regularly and five of his paintings, especially "Early Mist Over Granchester", have been featured on the official Grantchester website.
