= Nicholas Luard =

British politician (1937–2004)

Nicholas Lamert Luard (26 June 1937 – 25 May 2004) was a British writer and politician.

== Background ==
Nicholas Lamert Luard was born on 26 June 1937 in Hampstead, London.

Luard was educated at Winchester College and Magdalene College, Cambridge, where he read English and was taught by F. R. Leavis. He met Peter Cook through Footlights. A very short academic career was replaced by club management on the strength of a legacy. He co-founded The Establishment club in the early 1960s with Peter Cook. He then went into writing. He was one of the Lords Gnome of Private Eye.

With Chris Brasher, Nigel Hawkins and Denis Mollison, he founded the John Muir Trust in 1983. Hawkins served as chairman from 1991 to 1997.

Luard stood as a candidate for the Referendum Party in the 1997 general election, against Michael Portillo in Enfield Southgate.

Luard married Elisabeth Longmore, the food writer, in 1962.

He died on 25 May 2004 in Kensington, London.

== Bibliography ==
- Refer to Drawer: Being a Penetrating Survey of a Shameful National Practice - Hustling. With Dominick Elwes; illus. John Glashan. London: Arthur Barker, 1964.
- The Warm and Golden War. London: Secker & Warburg, 1967 (ISBN 0450003418). New York: Pantheon, 1967.
- Travelling Horseman. London: Weidenfeld & Nicolson, 1975. (ISBN 9780297770404)
- The Robespierre Serial. London: Weidenfeld & Nicolson, 1975 (ISBN 9780297768609). New York: Harcourt Brace Jovanovich, 1975 (ISBN 0151783195)
- The Orion Line. London: Secker & Warburg, 1976 (ISBN 978-0-436-26901-1)
- Blood Spoor. Under the pen name of James McVean, London: Raven Books, 1977 (ISBN 0354041606)
- The Dirty Area. London: Hamish Hamilton, 1979 (ISBN 0241101301)
- The Last Wilderness: A Journey Across the Great Kalahari Desert. New York: Simon & Schuster, 1981 (ISBN 0671412647). London: Elm Tree, 1981 (ISBN 0241102995)
- Andalucia: A Portrait of Southern Spain. London: Century, 1984 (ISBN 978-0-7126-0330-0)
- The Wildlife Parks of Africa. London: Michael Joseph, 1985
- Landscape in Spain. Photographs by Michael Bussele. Boston: Little, Brown, 1988 (ISBN 0821217062). London: Pavilion, 1988 (ISBN 185145246X)
- Gondar. London: Century, 1988 (ISBN 0712619194)
- Kala. London: Century, 1990 (ISBN 0712625488)
- Himalaya. London: Century, 1992 (ISBN 0712630066)
- Sanctuary. London: Hodder & Stoughton, 1994 (ISBN 0340604255)
- Silverback. London: Hodder & Stoughton, 1996 (ISBN 0340604263)
- The Field of the Star: Pilgrim's Journey to Santiago De Compostela. London: Michael Joseph, 1998 (ISBN 0718142039)
