= Michael Portillo =

British broadcaster, journalist and former politician (born 1953)

The Right Honourable Michael Portillo FRSGS
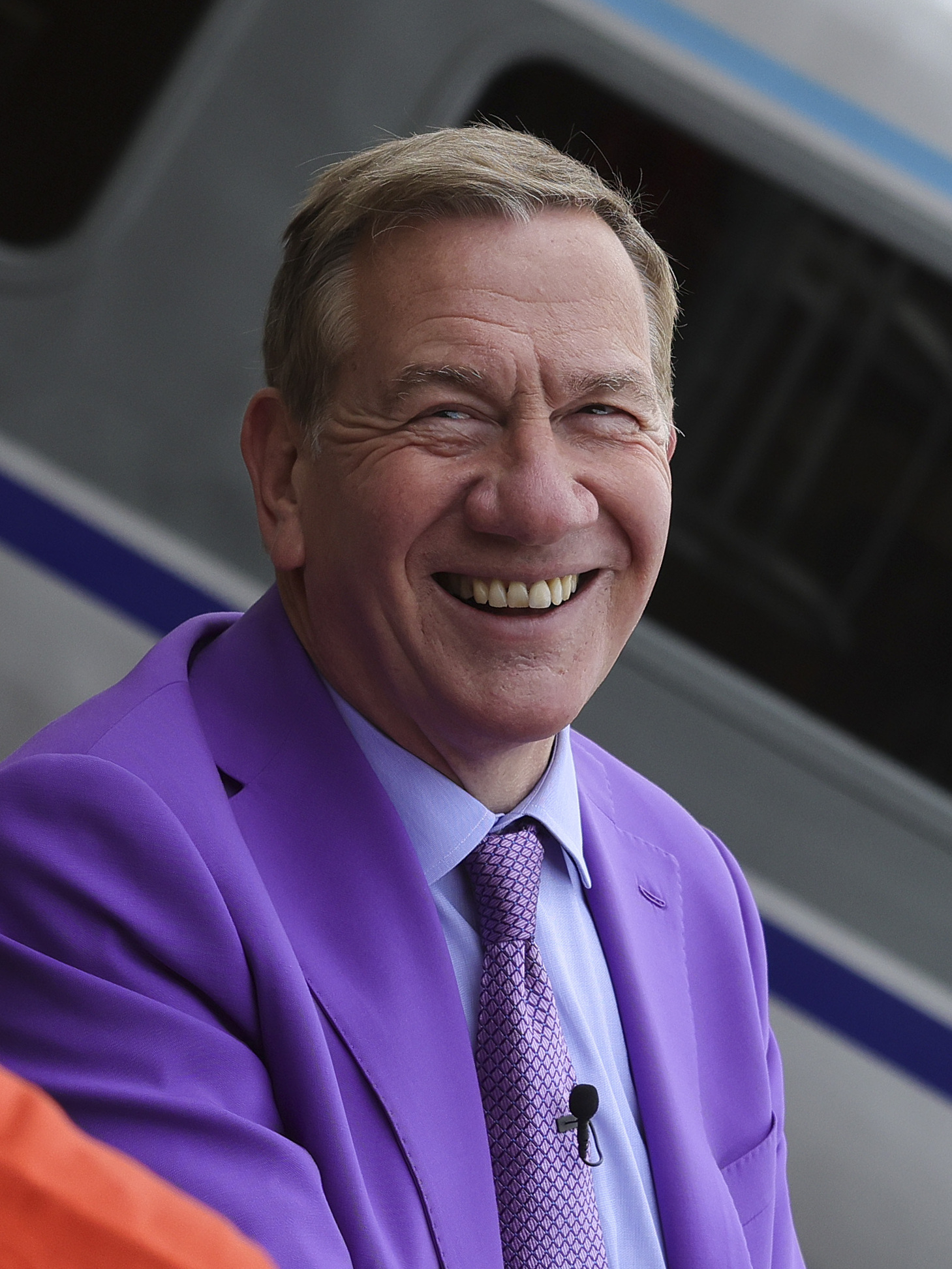
- Portillo in 2022

Secretary of State for Defence
- In office 5 July 1995 – 2 May 1997
- Prime Minister: John Major
- Preceded by: Malcolm Rifkind
- Succeeded by: George Robertson

Secretary of State for Employment
- In office 20 July 1994 – 5 July 1995
- Prime Minister: John Major
- Preceded by: David Hunt
- Succeeded by: Gillian Shephard

Chief Secretary to the Treasury
- In office 11 April 1992 – 20 July 1994
- Prime Minister: John Major
- Chancellor: Kenneth Clarke; Norman Lamont
- Preceded by: David Mellor
- Succeeded by: Jonathan Aitken
Shadow portfolios
Shadow Chancellor of the Exchequer
In office 1 February 2000 – 18 September 2001
Leader	William Hague
Preceded by	Francis Maude
Succeeded by	Michael Howard
Junior Ministerial offices
Minister of State for Local Government
In office 4 May 1990 – 14 April 1992
Prime Minister	John Major
Preceded by	David Hunt
Succeeded by	John Redwood
Minister of State for Transport
In office 25 July 1988 – 4 May 1990
Prime Minister	Margaret Thatcher
Preceded by	David Mitchell
Succeeded by	Roger Freeman
Parliamentary Under-Secretary of State for Health and Social Security
In office 13 June 1987 – 25 July 1988
Prime Minister	Margaret Thatcher
Preceded by	Nicholas Lyell
Succeeded by	Peter Lloyd
Assistant Government Whip
In office 16 October 1986 – 15 June 1987
Prime Minister	Margaret Thatcher
Parliamentary offices
Member of Parliament for Kensington and Chelsea
In office 25 November 1999 – 11 April 2005
Preceded by	Alan Clark
Succeeded by	Malcolm Rifkind
Member of Parliament for Enfield Southgate
In office 13 December 1984 – 8 April 1997
Preceded by	Anthony Berry
Succeeded by	Stephen Twigg

Personal details
- Born: Michael Denzil Xavier Portillo; 26 May 1953 (age 73) Bushey, Hertfordshire, England
- Citizenship: United Kingdom; Spain
- Party: Formerly Conservative
- Spouse: Carolyn Claire Eadie (m. 1982)
- Parent: Luis Gabriel Portillo (father)
- Education: Peterhouse, Cambridge (BA)
- Occupation: Broadcaster (1998–present); Politician (1984–2005)
- Television: Great British Railway Journeys and other documentaries

Michael Denzil Xavier Portillo (/pɔːrˈtɪloʊ/ por-TIL-oh; (Note: Spanish pronunciation: [poɾˈtiʎo] or [poɾˈtiʝo].) born 26 May 1953) is a British journalist, broadcaster, and retired politician. His broadcast series include railway documentaries such as Great British Railway Journeys and Great Continental Railway Journeys. A former member of the Conservative Party, he was Member of Parliament (MP) for Enfield Southgate from 1984 to 1997 and Kensington and Chelsea from 1999 to 2005, holding a number of ministerial and Cabinet positions.

Portillo obtained a first-class degree in history from the University of Cambridge, having been a student at Peterhouse. He began his working life as a graduate trainee with the transport company Ocean Group plc, before joining the Conservative Research Department (CRD) in 1976. First elected to the House of Commons in a 1984 by-election, Portillo served as a junior minister under both Margaret Thatcher and John Major, before entering the Cabinet in 1992 as Chief Secretary to the Treasury. He was promoted to Secretary of State for Employment in 1994. A Thatcherite and a Eurosceptic, he was seen as a likely challenger to Major during the 1995 Conservative leadership election, but did not stand, and was subsequently promoted to Secretary of State for Defence. As Defence Secretary, he pressed for a course of "clear blue water": purist policies separating the Conservatives from the Labour Party.

Portillo unexpectedly lost the previously safe Conservative Enfield Southgate seat at the 1997 general election. This led to the coining of the expression "Portillo moment". Returning to the Commons in the 1999 by-election in Kensington and Chelsea, Portillo rejoined the frontbench as Shadow Chancellor of the Exchequer. Standing for the leadership of the party in 2001, he came in third place behind Iain Duncan Smith and Kenneth Clarke. He retired from the House of Commons and from active politics at the 2005 general election.

Since leaving politics, Portillo has pursued his media interests by presenting and participating in a wide range of television and radio programmes. Portillo's passion for steam trains led him to make the BBC documentary series Great British Railway Journeys, beginning in 2010, in which he travels the British railway networks, referring to various editions of Bradshaw's Guide. The success of the show led Portillo to present series about railway systems in other countries. In 2022, he began to present a political show, Portillo, for the British television channel GB News.

== Early life ==
Portillo was born in Bushey, Hertfordshire, on 26 May 1953 to an exiled Spanish republican father, Luis Gabriel Portillo (1907–1993) and a Scottish mother, Cora Waldegrave de Portillo (née Blyth; 1919–2014). Portillo's father, a devout Catholic, was a member of left-wing movements in the 1930s and fled Madrid when it fell to General Franco in 1939, settling in England. He became head of the London Diplomatic Office of the Government in Exile in 1972. Portillo's maternal grandfather, John Waldegrave Blyth (1873–1962), was a prosperous linen manufacturer from Kirkcaldy, who left an art collection worth millions to the Kirkcaldy Galleries.

Portillo was registered as a Spanish citizen at the age of four, and in accordance with Spanish naming customs (which require a person to have two surnames) his Spanish passport names him as Miguel Portillo Blyth. Portillo's now well-known "love affair with trains" started when he was a youth. He owned a clockwork train set, and envied friends who had electric ones. Additionally, his mother took him on 13-hour trips from London to Kirkcaldy aboard a steam-hauled night train, the Starlight Special, to visit his British grandparents, and he had summer holidays on the Isle of Wight, where he "loved" the steam railway between Ryde and Ventnor.

In 1961, aged 8, Portillo appeared in a television advertisement for Ribena, a blackcurrant cordial drink. He was educated at Stanburn Primary School in Stanmore and Harrow County School for Boys and was awarded a scholarship to Peterhouse, Cambridge, where he studied history. While at school Portillo had supported the cause of the Labour Party; he attributed his embrace of conservatism at Cambridge to the influence of the right-wing Peterhouse historian Maurice Cowling.

In 1982, Portillo married Carolyn Claire Eadie.

== Political career (1984–2005) ==
Portillo graduated in 1975 with a first-class degree in history, and, after a brief stint with Ocean Transport and Trading Ltd., a shipping and transport company, he joined the Conservative Research Department in 1976. Following the Conservative victory in 1979, he became a government adviser to David Howell at the Department of Energy. He left to work for Kerr-McGee Oil between 1981 and 1983. In the 1983 general election, he fought his first electoral contest, in the Labour-held seat of Birmingham Perry Barr, losing to the incumbent, Jeff Rooker.

=== Election ===
Portillo returned to advisory work for the government, and, in December 1984, he stood for and won the Enfield Southgate by-election, following the death of the incumbent, Sir Anthony Berry, in the bombing of the Grand Hotel, Brighton by the IRA. Initially, Portillo was a Parliamentary Private Secretary to John Moore, and then an assistant whip.

=== In government ===
In 1987, Portillo was given his first ministerial post, as Parliamentary Under-Secretary of State for Social Security; the following year, he was promoted to Minister of State for Transport. Portillo has stated that he considers "saving the Settle to Carlisle railway" to be his greatest achievement. He was a strong supporter of Margaret Thatcher.

In 1990, Portillo was appointed Minister of State for Local Government, in which post he argued in favour of the ultimately highly unpopular Community Charge system (popularly known as "the Poll Tax"). He demonstrated a consistently right-of-centre line (exemplified by his insistence, in a well-publicised speech, on placing "clear blue water" between the policies of the Conservatives and other parties) and was favoured by Norman Tebbit and Margaret Thatcher, who said of him "[We] expect great things of you, do not disappoint us". His rise continued under John Major; he was made a Cabinet Minister in 1992 as Chief Secretary to the Treasury and was admitted to the Privy Council the same year. He subsequently became Secretary of State for Employment (1994–95), and then Secretary of State for Defence (1995–1997).

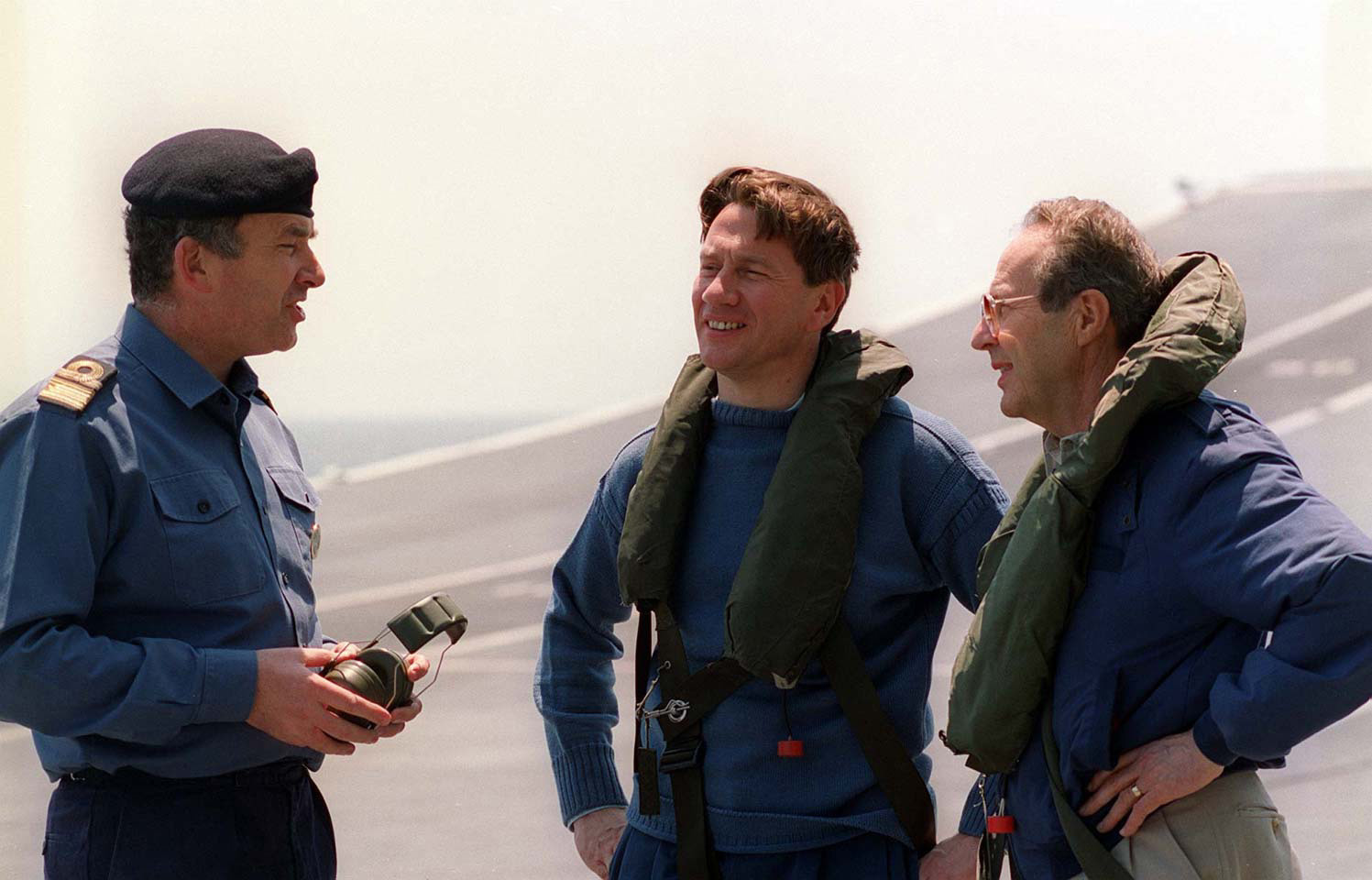
Portillo (centre) with Admiral Sir Peter Abbott and US Defence Secretary William J. Perry aboard HMS Illustrious in 1996

As Defence Secretary, Portillo became the object of criticism when he invoked the motto of the SAS, "Who Dares Wins", at a speech at the 1995 Conservative Party annual conference. In 1996 his ministry undertook the sale of the entire stock of Ministry of Defence (MoD) housing for military personnel to Annington Homes. (Note: In 2022 the MoD announced plans to reverse this and return the properties to public ownership.) His high profile led to constant attention from the media, including Private Eye, which mockingly referred to him as "Portaloo". He was accused of vanity when Alexandra Palace was hired to celebrate his ten years in politics.

Some saw the Defence Secretary post as a reward for Portillo's cautious loyalty to Major during the 1995 leadership challenge of John Redwood, following Major's "back me or sack me" resignation as party leader. Many urged Portillo, the "darling of the right", to run against Major. He declined to enter the first round, but planned to challenge Major if the contest went to a second round. To this end, he set up a potential campaign headquarters, with banks of telephone lines. He later admitted that this had been an error: "I did not want to oppose [Major], but neither did I want to close the possibility of entering a second ballot if it came to that." Portillo acknowledged that "ambiguity is unattractive" and his opponents within the party later used Portillo's apparent equivocation as an example of his indecisiveness; "I appeared happy to wound but afraid to strike: a dishonourable position."

=== 1997 election defeat ===
Portillo's loss of the Enfield Southgate seat, in the 1997 general election to Labour's Stephen Twigg, came as a shock to many politicians and commentators, and came to symbolise the extent of the Labour landslide victory. Halfway through the campaign, Portillo invited aides Andrew Cooper and Michael Simmonds to his house and presented them with some ideas for a leadership campaign following the expected Conservative defeat and asked them to finish it off. However, when a poll in The Observer on the weekend before the election showed that Portillo held only a three-point lead in his hitherto-safe seat, Portillo asked Cooper, who oversaw the party's internal polling, to reassure him that it was wrong; Cooper was unable to and Portillo began to think that he might lose.

He was interviewed by Jeremy Paxman on election night, prior to the result being called in his own seat. Paxman opened the interview with the question "so Michael, are you going to miss the limo?"—a reference to the expectation that the Conservatives were headed for defeat and thus he would no longer be a Minister. Portillo was then asked "are we seeing the end of the Conservative Party as a credible force in British politics?". He has since revealed that, prior to the interview, he had already come to believe he had lost his seat:

I saw that the exit poll was predicting a 160 seat majority for Labour. I thought, "when is Paxman going to ask me have I lost my seat?", because I deduced from that that I had. I then drove the car to my constituency and I knew I'd lost. But I also saw David Mellor. David Mellor had this really bad tempered spat with Jimmy Goldsmith [after the Putney election results had been announced]. I saw this and I thought if there's one thing I do when I lose, I'm going to lose with as much dignity as I can muster and not be like this David Mellor—Goldsmith thing.

Portillo's defeat represented a 17.4% swing to Labour. Symbolising the loss of the election by the Conservative Party, it has been referred to as "the Portillo moment", and in the cliché "Were you up for Portillo?" (i.e., "Were you awake/did you see Portillo's result announced on television?") In 2010, Portillo wrote: "I had hoped for something better than Were You Still Up for Portillo? Now I feel lucky to have been ejected. I discovered that there is life and livelihood outside Westminster."

=== Return to Parliament ===
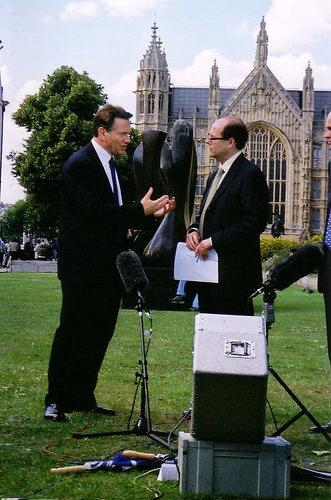
Portillo (left) being interviewed by Nick Robinson in 2001

Following the election, Portillo renewed his attachment to Kerr-McGee, but also undertook substantial media work, including programmes for the BBC and Channel 4. In an interview with The Times given in 1999, Portillo said that "I had some homosexual experiences as a young person." A few weeks after he had given that interview, the death of Alan Clark gave Portillo the opportunity to return to Parliament, despite Lord Tebbit accusing Portillo of lying about the extent of his sexual "deviance", and similar comments from an associate included in a profile of Portillo in The Guardian newspaper. He comfortably won the by-election in late November 1999 to represent Kensington and Chelsea, traditionally one of the safest Conservative seats.

On 1 February 2000, William Hague promoted Portillo to the Shadow cabinet as Deputy Leader and Shadow Chancellor. On 3 February, Portillo stood opposite the Chancellor of the Exchequer, Gordon Brown, in the House of Commons for the first time in his new role. During this session, Portillo declared that a future Conservative government would enhance the independence of the Bank of England and increase its accountability to Parliament, and that it would not repeal the national minimum wage.

=== 2001 leadership election ===
Following the 2001 general election, Portillo contested the leadership of the party. In the first ballot of Conservative MPs, he led well. However, there followed press stories, including references to his previous homosexual experiences and to his equivocation at the time of Major's 1995 resignation. He was knocked out in the final round of voting by Conservative MPs, his sexual history – according to Kenneth Clarke – having damaged his chances, leaving party members to choose between Iain Duncan Smith and Kenneth Clarke.

Portillo's supporters became known as "Portillistas".

=== Retirement from politics ===
When Duncan Smith was elected leader, Portillo returned to the backbenches. In March 2003, he voted in favour of the 2003 invasion of Iraq. In November 2003, he turned down an offer of a Shadow Cabinet post from the incoming Conservative leader Michael Howard. He did not seek re-election in the 2005 general election. His membership of the Conservative Party has since lapsed.

Talking to Andrew Neil on This Week in May 2016, he gave his views on the effectiveness of David Cameron's government and its legislative plans as described in the Queen's speech: "After 23 years of careful thought about what they would like to do in power ... the answer is nothing", a description which The Guardian described as "elegant".

Portillo supported Brexit. In a 2016 television discussion, he said that "because of the catastrophic blunder committed by David Cameron, [Nigel] Farage deserves a place in history" because "he spooked the Prime Minister into holding a referendum that he then lost." Portillo also condemned Theresa May's 2018 "Chequers plan" for exit negotiations as "the most dreadful betrayal, and if I had been a member of the Cabinet, I would have been one of the ones who would have quit over the weekend."

== Business interests ==
In September 2002, Portillo became a non-executive director of the multinational defence contractor BAE Systems. He stepped down from that position in March 2006, owing to potential conflicts of interest. He was a member of the board of the Kerr-McGee Corporation for a few months in 2006.

== Broadcasting career (1998–present) ==
=== Television ===
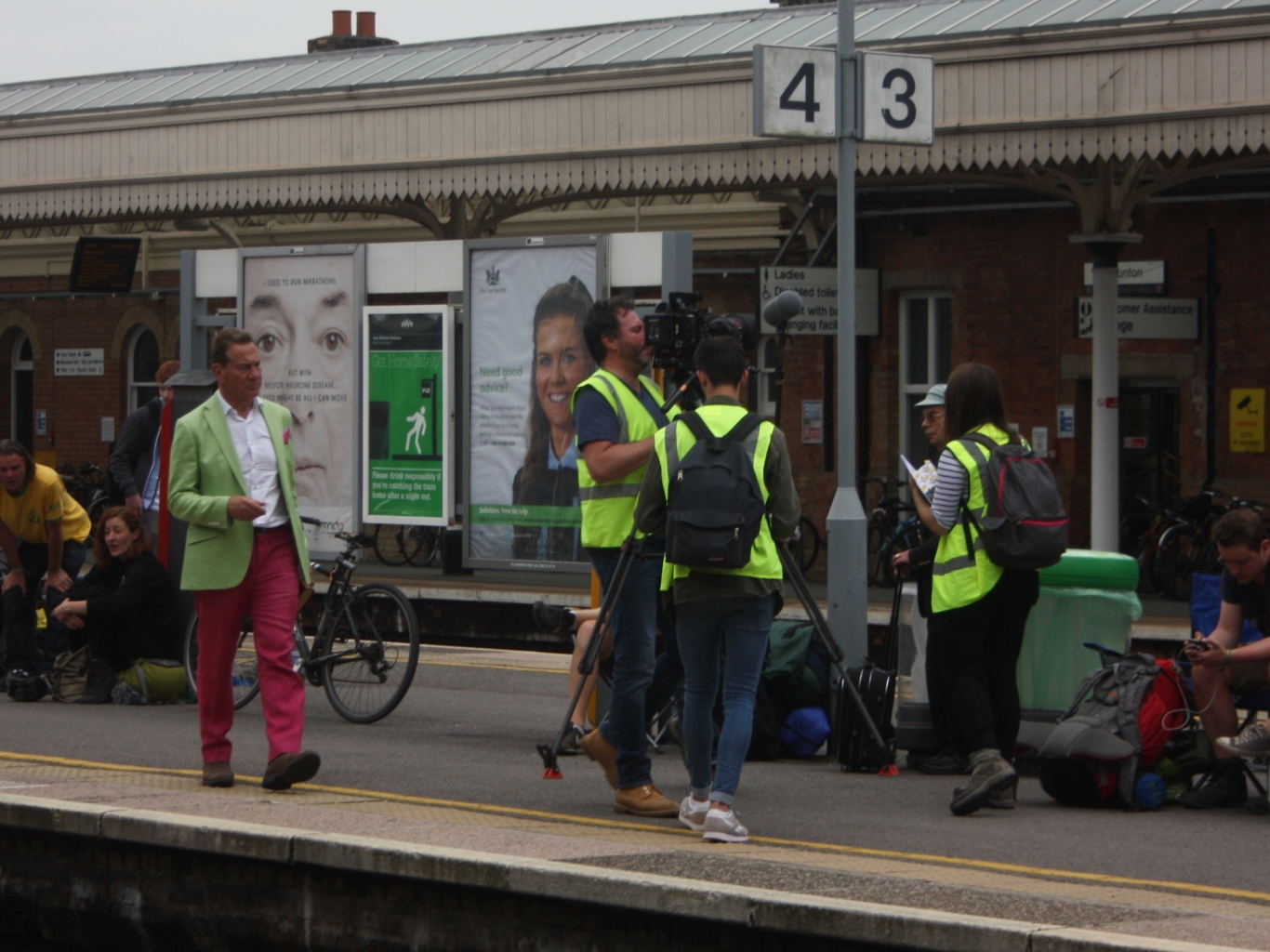
Filming at Taunton railway station, in trademark exotic colours, 2017

1998 saw Portillo make his first foray into broadcasting on Channel 4 with Portillo's Progress—three 60-minute-long programmes looking into the changed social and political scene in Britain. From 2002 onwards, Portillo developed an active career in media, both as a commentator on public affairs and as a writer and/or presenter of television and radio documentaries. Between its inception in 2003 and cancellation in 2019, Portillo appeared in the BBC weekly political discussion programme This Week with Andrew Neil, and, until September 2010, Labour MP Diane Abbott. (Note: Portillo has known Abbott for many years: they both attended schools in the London Borough of Harrow, and both were in a joint school production of Romeo and Juliet, though not in the title roles. Later, while still at school, Portillo cast Abbott in a film version of Macbeth, but the film was never completed. She played Lady Macduff to his Macduff. These details of their schooldays were originally added to this article by Clive Anderson on 2 July 2007, as an example of the workings of Wikipedia, during the making of The Wikipedia Story (BBC Radio 4), first broadcast on 24 July 2007. Anderson was at school with Abbott and Portillo; the issue of 'original research' (i.e. that Anderson had contributed these details from his own knowledge, not from a secondary source) was not addressed in the programme itself.)

Portillo has featured in a number of television documentaries. In 2006 he made a programme on Spanish wildlife for BBC Two's The Natural World series. For an episode of the 2003 BBC Two series My Week In The Real World, in which politicians stepped into the shoes of members of the public, Portillo took over, for one week, the life, family and income of a single mother living on benefits in Wallasey.

He chose to present Queen Elizabeth I for the BBC's series of Great Britons in 2002. In 2005 he presented the lavish BBC documentary re-telling of the story of Lord Nelson, Nelson's Trafalgar (2005). Between 2002 and 2007, he presented a discussion series called Dinner with Portillo on BBC Four, in which political and social questions were explored by Portillo and his seven guests over a four-course meal. His guests included Bianca Jagger, Grayson Perry, Francis Wheen, Seymour Hersh, PD James, Baroness Williams, George Galloway, Benazir Bhutto and Germaine Greer. In 2007, he participated in the BBC television project The Verdict, serving, with other well known figures, as a jury member hearing a fictional rape case. He was elected as the jury's foreman.

The documentary How To Kill a Human Being in the Horizon series featured Portillo carrying out a survey of capital punishment methods (including undertaking some near death experiences himself), in an attempt to find an 'acceptable' form of capital punishment. It was broadcast on BBC Two on 15 January 2008. He made a second Horizon documentary, titled How Violent Are You?, broadcast on 12 May 2009. In 2008, Portillo made a documentary as part of the BBC Headroom campaign, which explored mental health issues. Portillo's documentary Michael Portillo: Death of a School Friend explores how the suicide of Portillo's classmate Gary Findon affected Findon's parents, brother, music teachers, schoolteachers, classmates, and Portillo himself. The programme was originally broadcast on 7 November 2008.

Other television programmes presented by Portillo have included:

- Portillo's State Secrets (BBC Two, ten parts, from 23 March 2015), in which Portillo examined classified documents from the British National Archives.
- The Enemy Files (RTÉ One in Ireland, and BBC Northern Ireland, 2016), ahead of the centenary of the Easter Rising.
- Portillo's Hidden History of Britain (Channel 5 series, 2018).
- Portillo: The Trouble With The Tories (Channel 5, 2-part series, August 2019), which examined the history of the Conservative Party's divisions.
- Portillo's Empire Journey (Channel 5, 4-part series, from 15 May 2020). Portillo tells the story of the creation of the British Empire.
- Hawks & Doves: The Crown and Ireland's War of Independence (RTÉ, 2020), which gave an account of the Irish War of Independence from a British perspective.
- Spanish Civil War with Michael Portillo (Discovery History, 2020).
- Coastal Devon & Cornwall with Michael Portillo (Channel 5, six-part series, August–September 2021).

On 26 May 2022, Channel 5 commissioned The Pyrenees with Michael Portillo, a four-part series that premiered 23 August 2022. In early 2022, Portillo filled a guest spot on the GB News show, The Political Correction, after which he was invited to host his own weekend political show Portillo, which started airing on 2 October 2022. In late 2023, Portillo's Andalucia, a six-part travelogue series aired on Channel 5, with the channel going on to commission a series of 90 minute travelogues set around various European cities. The first three programmes were broadcast under the title Michael Portillo's Long Weekends from 19 April 2024, with Madrid, Prague and Milan being featured. From 17 August 2024, the next three programmes in the series were broadcast on Channel 5 under the titles Sicily with Michael Portillo, Lisbon with Michael Portillo, and Stockholm with Michael Portillo.

In September 2025, Portillo presented Michael Portillo's 200 Years of the Railways, a two-part series about the development of the modern British railways.

==== Great Railway Journeys ====
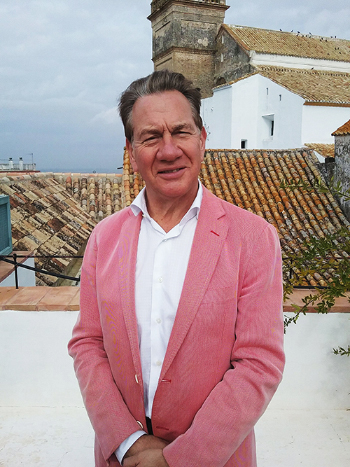
Portillo in 2017

In 1999, Portillo presented an episode of Great Railway Journeys, on the route between Granada and Salamanca in Spain. In 2009, he filmed a series titled Great British Railway Journeys, in which he explored, with the aid of George Bradshaw's 1863 tourist handbook, how the railways had had a profound influence on the social, economic and political history of Britain. The series commenced broadcasting in January 2010. A second series was broadcast on BBC Two in 2011, and as of May 2025, there has been a total of sixteen series. He also presented a similar television series, Great Continental Railway Journeys, which followed Portillo around continental Europe. A second series was broadcast in 2013, and to date there has been a total of eight series. In 2014, as part of the BBC's World War I commemorations, Portillo presented Railways of the Great War with Michael Portillo over five nights in August 2014.

In early 2016, Portillo began a new BBC travel documentary series Great American Railroad Journeys, which saw him travelling across the United States by rail. Other similar series followed: Great Indian Railway Journeys from 2018 and Great Alaskan Railroad Journeys and Great Canadian Railway Journeys, which both started airing in January 2019. A series Great Australian Railway Journeys began airing on BBC2 on 26 October 2019, with six journeys across Australia. This was followed by a series Great Asian Railway Journeys from 27 January 2020, and Great Coastal Railway Journeys (BBC2, January–May 2024). Great Japanese Railway Journeys (April–May 2026) & Great Korean Railway Journeys (May 2026).

In 2020, as part of his Great Continental Railway Journeys, in the episode "Salamanca to Canfranc", while in Salamanca, Portillo was given access to papers about his father held at the General Archive of the Spanish Civil War.

Great Central Asian Railway Journeys premiered on 11 May 2026; in the five-part series, Portillo follows the Silk Road through Uzbekistan.

=== Press and radio ===
Portillo has written a regular column for The Sunday Times, contributes to other journals (he was a theatre critic for the New Statesman until May 2006), and is a regular radio broadcaster on UK radio. He is a long-serving member of the panel in the BBC Radio 4 series The Moral Maze. In September 2011, he presented a two-part series on BBC Radio 4 called Capitalism on Trial. He has also presented a history series on BBC Radio 4 called Things We Forgot to Remember.

In June 2013, he presented a series of twelve 15-minute radio programmes (following the daily World at One news programme) on BBC Radio 4 called 1913 – the Year Before, about the state of Britain in the years preceding World War I, challenging the view that these years were optimistic and cheerful. On 7 May 2020, it was announced that Portillo would join the new digital station Times Radio, which launched in June 2020. He hosted a Friday evening programme on politics, culture and history.

== Voluntary work ==
Since 1998, Portillo has been a Commissioner of the International Commission on Missing Persons (ICMP). He is President of DEBRA, a British charity working on behalf of people with epidermolysis bullosa (EB), a genetic skin blistering condition. Portillo served as chairman of the 2008 Man Booker Prize committee.

In 2011, Portillo became chairman of a new arts endowment fund supported by the Arts Council, the Heritage Lottery Fund and the Department for Culture, Media and Sport. Applicants could bid for grants of between £500,000 and £5m, which were to be matched from the private sector. The fund, which operated under the title "Catalyst: Endowments", made 31 awards over the two years 2012–13 totalling £36 million. Recipients included Dulwich Picture Gallery, the Mary Rose Trust, Lincoln Cathedral and the Severn Valley Railway.

Portillo is the British chairman of the Anglo-Spanish organisation Tertulias, which organises annual meetings between the two countries. He is also an Honorary Vice-President of Canning House, the Hispanic and Luso Brazilian Council. He has a home in Carmona in Andalusia. Portillo has a strong interest in contemporary visual arts and is Chairman of the Board of Trustees of the Federation of British Artists, an educational arts charity. In 2018, he accepted the role as President of the Friends of the Settle–Carlisle line following the death of the previous incumbent, Sir William McAlpine.

== Honours ==
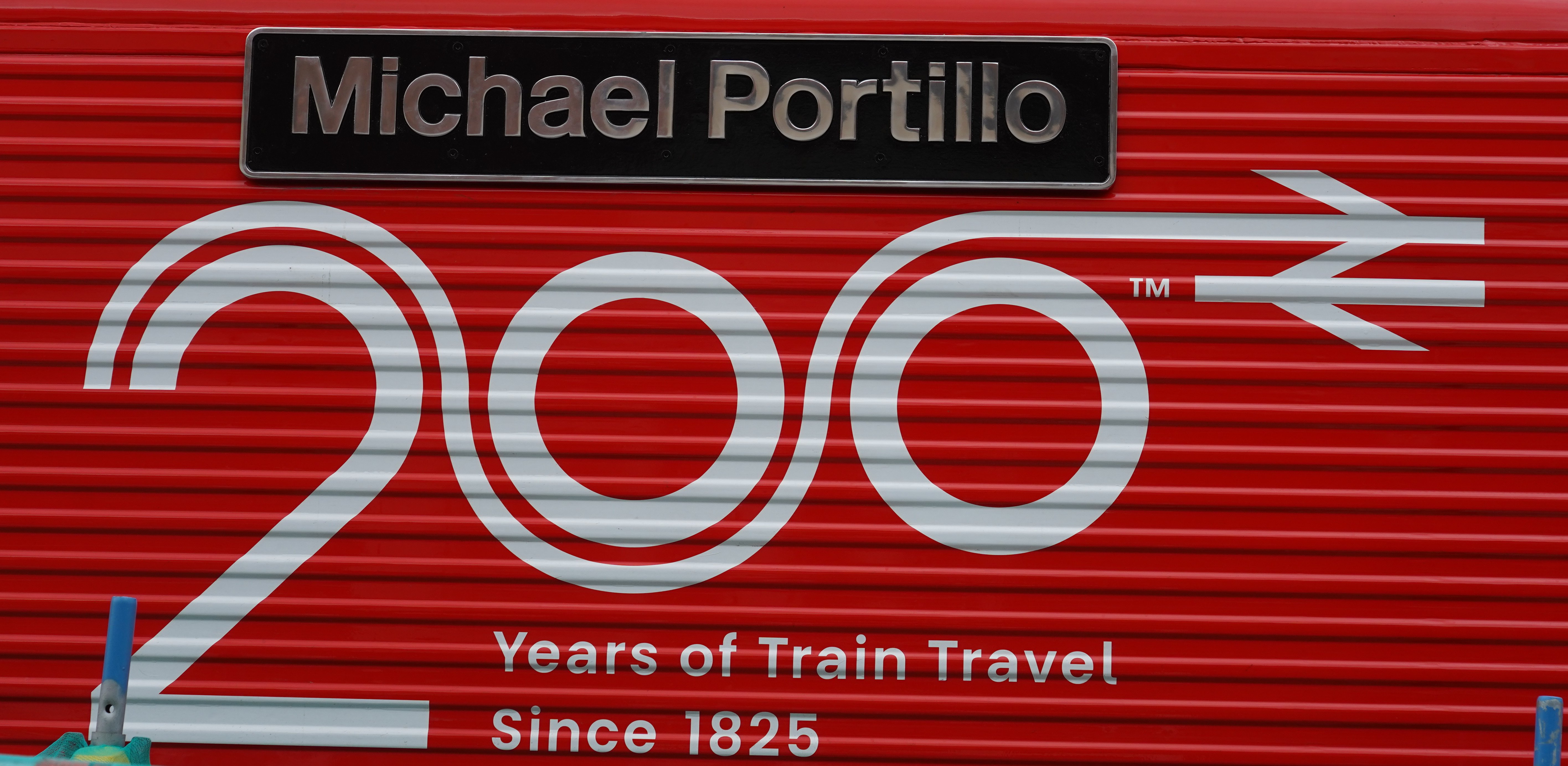
Class 66 66719 Michael Portillo locomotive nameplate, named at Greatest Gathering in Derby (2025)

- Michael Portillo was sworn in as a member of the Privy Council of the United Kingdom in 1992 upon his appointment as Chief Secretary to the Treasury, giving him the honorific title "The Right Honourable" for life.
- He was awarded an Honorary Doctorate by Richmond, The American International University in London in 2003.
- In 2018, Portillo was made a fellow of the Royal Scottish Geographical Society (FRSGS).
- He has been awarded the Freedom of the City of London. He was given the honour of leading the annual Sheep Drive over London Bridge on 29 September 2019.

== Publications ==
- Portillo, Michael (2015). Great Continental Railway Journeys. Simon and Schuster. ISBN 9781471151491.
- Portillo, Michael (2017). Great American Railroad Journeys. Simon & Schuster UK. ISBN 9781471151514.
- Portillo, Michael (2018). Portillo's Hidden History of Britain. Michael O'Mara. ISBN 9781789290646.
- Portillo, Michael (2020). Greatest British Railway Journeys. Headline Publishing. ISBN 9781472279279.

== Notes ==
Parliament of the United Kingdom
Preceded by Anthony Berry	Member of Parliament for Enfield Southgate; 1984–1997	Succeeded by Stephen Twigg
Preceded by Alan Clark	Member of Parliament for Kensington and Chelsea; 1999–2005	Succeeded by Malcolm Rifkind
Political offices
Preceded by David Mellor	Chief Secretary to the Treasury; 1992–1994	Succeeded by Jonathan Aitken
Preceded by David Hunt	Secretary of State for Employment; 1994–1995	Succeeded by Gillian Shephard as Secretary of State for Education and Employment
Preceded by Malcolm Rifkind	Secretary of State for Defence; 1995–1997	Succeeded by George Robertson
Preceded by Francis Maude	Shadow Chancellor of the Exchequer; 2000–2001	Succeeded by Michael Howard
