= 1984 Enfield Southgate by-election =

UK parliamentary by-election

← 1983	13 December 1984	1987 →
Candidate	Michael Portillo	Timothy Slack	Peter Hamid
Party	Conservative	Liberal	Labour
Popular vote	16,684	11,973	4,000
Percentage	49.6%	35.6%	11.9%
MP before election
Anthony Berry
Conservative
Subsequent MP
Michael Portillo
Conservative

The 1984 Enfield Southgate by-election was a parliamentary by-election held on 13 December 1984 for the UK House of Commons constituency of Enfield Southgate.

== Previous MP ==
The seat had become vacant on 12 October 1984, when the constituency's Member of Parliament (MP) was killed by the Irish Republican Army in the Brighton hotel bombing.

Sir Anthony George Berry (12 February 1925 – 12 October 1984) was a Conservative MP for Enfield Southgate, and a Whip in Margaret Thatcher's government.

Sir Anthony Berry had been Southgate's MP since the 1964 general election. The constituency had been renamed Enfield Southgate in 1983.

== Candidates ==
Given the reason for the by-election, there was some discussion about the Labour Party and the Alliance not contesting the poll. However, in the end both opposition forces were represented in the list of candidates.

Nine candidates were nominated. The list below is set out in descending order of the number of votes received at the by-election.

1. The Conservative candidate was Michael Denzil Xavier Portillo. Born in 1953, Portillo was a Special Adviser to the Chancellor of the Exchequer. He had contested Birmingham Perry Barr in the 1983 general election.
  Portillo won the by-election and went on to become a prominent political figure. He was serving as Secretary of State for Defence, when defeated in this seat at the 1997 general election. Portillo subsequently represented Kensington and Chelsea (1999-2005) and was an unsuccessful candidate for the Conservative Party leadership (2001), before retiring from politics to pursue a media career.
2. The Liberal Party candidate, representing the SDP–Liberal Alliance, was Timothy Willatt Slack. He was a former headmaster, born in 1928, who was Director of the Foreign Office International Conference Centre. Slack had contested the seat of Petersfield at both general elections in 1974.
3. Representing the Labour Party was Winston Farouk Hamid (known as Peter Hamid). The Trinidad born Hamid was aged 52. He had lived in the UK for 31 years and was a member of Enfield Borough Council to which he had been elected in 1982.
4. Andreas Polydorou was an Independent, who ran as a Turkish Troops Out of Cyprus candidate.
5. Industrial chemist and Royal Navy veteran (1943-1946), James Wilfred Kershaw, stood on behalf of a far right group known as the Nationalist Party. Craig regarded Kershaw as a party candidate rather than an Independent.
6. Raymond Edwin Shenton was an English National Party candidate, who advocated a far right policy. Craig regarded Shenton as an Independent.
7. Iain Innes Burgess was an Independent candidate, whose ballot paper label was Abolish Greater London - Restore Middlesex Shire.
8. George Weiss stood for Captain Rainbow's Universal Party. Craig considered him an Independent.
9. Miss Helen Mary Anscomb was an Independent who used the label Death off Roads: Freight on Rail.

== Result ==
1984 Enfield Southgate by-election
Party	Candidate	Votes	%	±%
Conservative	Michael Portillo	16,684	49.6	−8.5
Liberal	Timothy Slack	11,973	35.6	+12.2
Labour	Peter Hamid	4,000	11.9	−6.0
Turkish Troops Out of Cyprus	Andreas Polydrou	687	2.0	New
Nationalist Party	James Kershaw	80	0.2	New
English National	Raymond Shenton	78	0.2	New
Abolish Greater London, Restore Middlesex	Iain Burgess	50	0.2	New
Captain Rainbow's Universal Party	George Weiss	48	0.2	New
Death off Roads: Freight on Rail	Helen Anscomb	45	0.1	New
Majority		4,711	14.0	−20.7
Turnout		33,645	50.6	−19.0
Registered electors		66,473		
Conservative hold		Swing	−10.3	

== Previous result ==
General Election 1983: Enfield Southgate
Party	Candidate	Votes	%	±%
Conservative	Anthony Berry	26,451	58.1	−3.5
Liberal	D Morgan	10,632	23.3	+9.3
Labour	Mary Honeyball	8,132	17.9	−4.7
BNP	M Braithwaite	318	0.7	New
Majority		15,819	34.8	−4.3
Turnout		51,365	69.6	−6.7
Registered electors		65,438		
Conservative hold		Swing		

== See also ==
- Enfield Southgate constituency
- List of United Kingdom by-elections (1979–2010)
- United Kingdom by-election records

== Sources ==
- Britain Votes/Europe Votes By-Election Supplement 1983-, compiled and edited by F.W.S. Craig (Parliamentary Research Services 1985)
