= Bambos Charalambous =

British politician (born 1967)

Bambos Charalambous MP
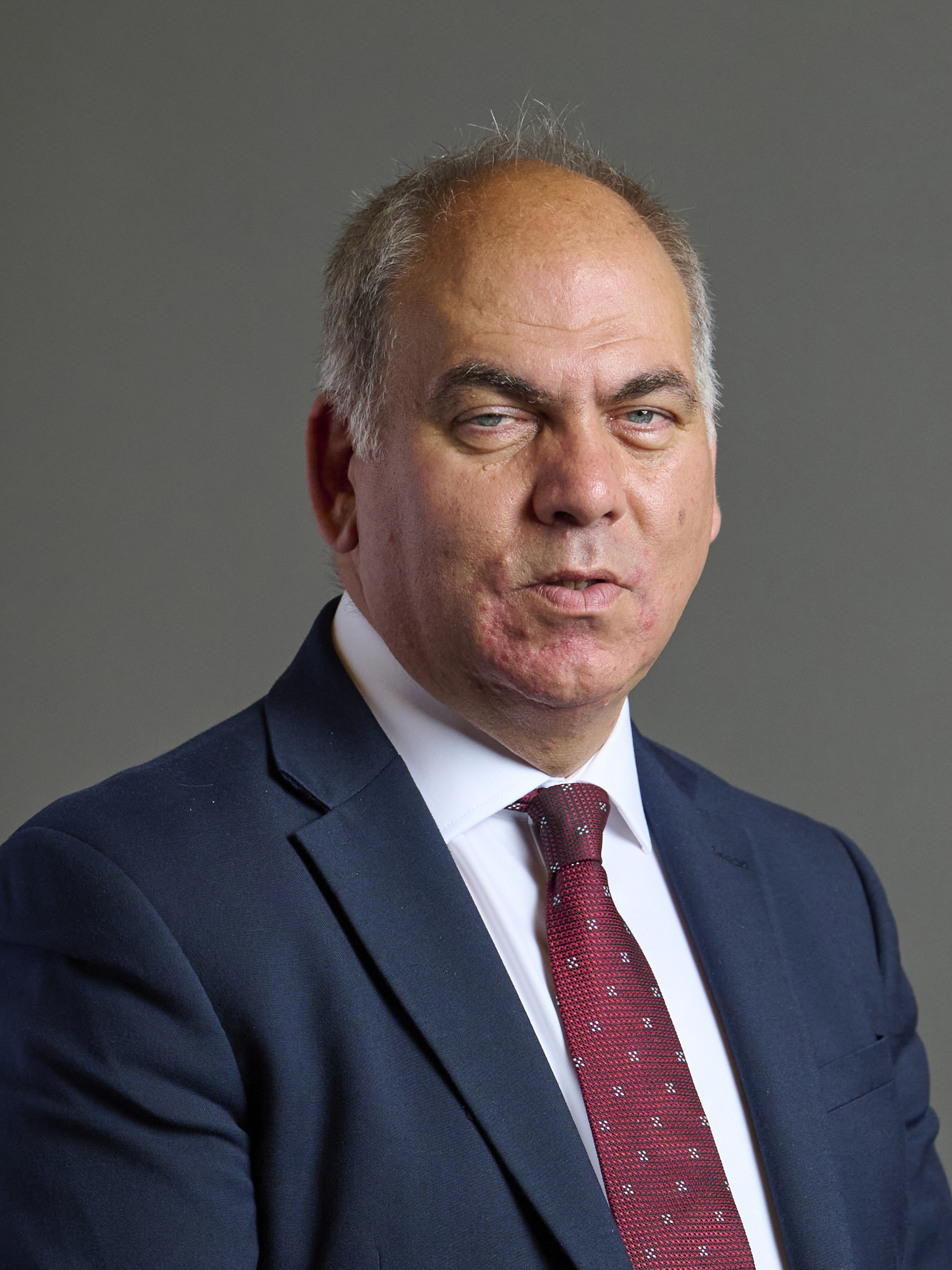
- Official portrait, 2024

Shadow Minister for the Middle East and North Africa
- In office 4 December 2021 – 9 June 2023
- Leader: Keir Starmer
- Preceded by: Wayne David
- Succeeded by: Wayne David

Shadow Minister for Immigration
- In office 14 May 2021 – 4 December 2021
- Leader: Keir Starmer
- Preceded by: Holly Lynch
- Succeeded by: Jack Dromey

Shadow Minister for Crime Reduction and Courts
- In office 9 April 2020 – 14 May 2021
- Leader: Keir Starmer
- Preceded by: Position established
- Succeeded by: Holly Lynch

Shadow Minister for Justice
- In office 22 January 2020 – 9 April 2020
- Leader: Jeremy Corbyn

Opposition Whip
- In office 6 December 2018 – 9 April 2020
- Leader: Jeremy Corbyn
- Preceded by: Fiona Onasanya

Member of Parliament for Southgate and Wood Green Enfield Southgate (2017–2024)
- Incumbent
- Assumed office 8 June 2017
- Preceded by: David Burrowes
- Majority: 15,300 (33.5%)

Personal details
- Born: Charalambos Charalambous; 1967 (age 58–59) Haringey, London, England
- Party: Labour
- Education: Liverpool John Moores University
- Website: Official website

Charalambos "Bambos" Charalambous (born 1967) is a British Labour politician who has been the Member of Parliament (MP) for Southgate and Wood Green, previously Enfield Southgate, since 2017. While in opposition he held a series of shadow ministry posts. He was suspended from the Labour Party during an investigation into a complaint against him between June 2023 and April 2024, but the complaint was not upheld.

Charalambous grew up in North London and trained and worked as a solicitor. Before entering national politics, he served as a member of Enfield Council for 24 years.

== Early life and career ==
Charalambos "Bambos" Charalambous was born in 1967, in a Greek Cypriot family and raised in Bowes Park. His parents come from Kalo Chorio and Fasoulla, both near Limassol, in Cyprus.

He was educated at Chace Boys' Comprehensive School, followed by Tottenham College and then Liverpool Polytechnic (now Liverpool John Moores University). Charalambous read law and was elected as vice president of the Students' Union in 1990.

Charalambous is a solicitor. Before and until his election as MP, he worked for Hackney Council in their housing litigation team.

He served as a member of Enfield Council for the Palmers Green ward for 24 years. Whilst a councillor, he also served as an Associate Cabinet Member for Leisure, Culture, Localism and Young People.

== Parliamentary career ==
At the 2005 general election, Charalambous stood as the Labour Party candidate in Epping Forest, coming second with 21% of the vote behind the incumbent Conservative MP Eleanor Laing.

Charalambous stood in Enfield Southgate at the 2010 general election, coming second with 32.2% of the vote behind the incumbent Conservative MP David Burrowes. He again stood in Enfield Southgate at the 2015 general election, coming second with 39% of the vote, again behind David Burrowes.

At the snap 2017 general election, Charalambous was elected to Parliament as MP for Enfield Southgate with 51.7% of the vote and a majority of 4,355.

Charalambous served on the Justice Select Committee. He also served as a member of the All-Party Parliamentary Groups on London, Cyprus, Crossrail Two, Autism, Sex Equality, Music, Global Education For All and London's Planning and Built Environment.

In January 2018, he was appointed Parliamentary Private Secretary (PPS) to Rebecca Long-Bailey, Shadow Secretary of State for Business, Energy and Industrial Strategy. In December 2018, he was appointed as an Opposition (Labour) Whip.

At the 2019 general election, Charalambous was re-elected as MP for Enfield Southgate with a decreased vote share of 48.5% and an increased majority of 4,450.

Charalambous was appointed as a Shadow Minister for Justice in January 2020.

Following Keir Starmer's election as Labour leader in April 2020, he joined the shadow Home Office team as the Shadow Minister for Crime Reduction and Courts. Charalambous swapped roles with Holly Lynch in a minor reshuffle in May 2021, becoming the Shadow Minister for Immigration. He served as Shadow Minister for the Middle East and North Africa from 2021 to June 2023, when he was suspended as a Labour MP following an allegation "that requires investigation by the Labour Party". After a thorough investigation involving scrutiny by a board chaired by an independent lawyer, the complaint was not upheld and he had the whip restored in April 2024.

Due to the 2023 review of Westminster constituencies, Charalambous' constituency of Enfield Southgate was abolished, and replaced with Southgate and Wood Green. At the 2024 general election, Charalambous was elected to Parliament as MP for Southgate and Wood Green with 51.1% of the vote and a majority of 15,300.

Parliament of the United Kingdom
Preceded by David Burrowes	Member of Parliament for Enfield Southgate; 2017–2024	Constituency abolished
New constituency	Member of Parliament for Southgate and Wood Green; 2024–present	Incumbent
