= Great Coastal Railway Journeys =

British television series

- Genre: Travel documentary
- Presented by: Michael Portillo
- Composer: Jon Wygens
- Country of origin: United Kingdom
- Original language: English
- No. of series: 3
- No. of episodes: 65

Production
- Executive producer: John Comerford
- Running time: 30 minutes
- Production company: Naked West

Original release
- Network: BBC Two; BBC Two HD
- Release: 24 January 2022 – present

Related
- Great Railway Journeys; Great British Railway Journeys; Great Continental Railway Journeys; Railways of the Great War with Michael Portillo (2014); Great American Railroad Journeys; Great Indian Railway Journeys; Great Alaskan Railroad Journeys; Great Canadian Railway Journeys; Great Australian Railway Journeys; Great Asian Railway Journeys

Great Coastal Railway Journeys is a BBC documentary series produced by Naked West and presented by Michael Portillo, a former Conservative MP and Minister of State for Transport.

Following the format of Great British Railway Journeys and related series with Portillo as presenter, each episode of this series features a coastal railway journey through England, Scotland, Wales or Ireland. Series 1 was first broadcast on BBC Two in January–February 2022, series 2 in May–June 2023, and series 3 in April–May 2024.

In addition to Great British Railway Journeys, Portillo has presented seven other programmes with a similar format: Great Continental Railway Journeys, Great American Railroad Journeys, Great Indian Railway Journeys, Great Alaskan Railroad Journeys, Great Canadian Railway Journeys, Great Australian Railway Journeys, and Great Asian Railway Journeys.

== Synopsis ==
Victorian guidebooks written by George Bradshaw under the title Bradshaw's Guide were the first comprehensive timetable and travel guides to the railway system in Great Britain, which at the time although it had grown to be extensive, still consisted of a number of fragmented and competing railway companies and lines, each publishing their own timetables.

Classified by the BBC in both the travel and history genres, the series features Portillo using the guide to plan his journeys, in the process visiting points of interest picked out in the guide and comparing its content with the modern world, both the physical and cultural ones.

== Format ==
Each series features Portillo travelling on a different route each week, with each daily episode being one short leg of the journey. The weekly journey is a point-to-point journey to take in a variety of locations along the route. Filmed entirely on location, the series features a mix of Portillo delivering commentary to camera, conducting ad-hoc interviews with members of the public or fellow travellers, and providing pre-arranged interviews.

== Broadcast ==
All episodes were originally broadcast on consecutive weekdays on BBC Two and simulcast on BBC Two HD.

=== Series 1 (2022) ===
==== Dunbar to Peterhead ====
The first journey takes Portillo along the east coast of Scotland, from Dunbar to Peterhead.

No.	Title	Original release date
1	"Dunbar to Edinburgh"	24 January 2022
Portillo alights at Dunbar station and then walks along the coastline to Siccar Point, where he meets Dr. Angus Miller who explains how, in 1788, the geologist James Hutton observed the rock strata of the Point and deduced that the earth was much older than had previously been believed. Returning to the railway, Portillo's next stop is North Berwick and, after a walk on the beach, he sails to Bass Rock to see a large colony of gannets. Next, he makes the journey to Edinburgh Waverley and walks along the Royal Mile. After climbing Arthur's Seat, he visits the Scottish Parliament Building, followed by Holyrood Palace where he discusses Mary Queen of Scots. In a newspaper interview promoting the series, Portillo said he had never done any filming quite like that on Bass Rock, and later took his family back to visit the island.
2	"Leith to Culross"	25 January 2022
Portillo travels along both shores of the Firth of Forth, starting at Leith where he is given a guided tour of the former royal yacht, HMY Britannia. He then travels west to Bo'ness for a ride on the Bo'ness and Kinneil Railway. At The Helix Park in Grangemouth, he sees The Kelpies, an equine sculpture, and makes a video call to Andy Scott, the sculptor who designed it. Portillo then takes the train from Falkirk Grahamston to Alloa to observe bottle-making at Alloa Glassworks before travelling to Culross to visit the garden of Culross Palace.
3	"Stirling to East Neuk"	26 January 2022
4	"St Andrews to Stonehaven"	27 January 2022
5	"Forvie to Peterhead"	28 January 2022

==== Inverness to Orkney Islands ====
In Portillo's second journey, he travels north from Inverness to the Orkney Islands.

No.	Title	Original release date
6	"Inverness to Cairngorms"	31 January 2022
7	"Cullen to Cawdor"	1 February 2022
8	"Invergordon to Tain"	2 February 2022
9	"Lairg to Caithness"	3 February 2022
10	"Thurso to Orkney"	4 February 2022

==== Tynemouth to Berwick-upon-Tweed ====
Portillo's third journey takes him along the coast of North East England, from Tynemouth to Berwick-upon-Tweed.

No.	Title	Original release date
11	"Tynemouth to Bardon Mill"	7 February 2022
12	"Newcastle to Lynemouth"	8 February 2022
13	"Morpeth to Amble"	9 February 2022
14	"Alnmouth to Bamburgh"	10 February 2022
15	"Farne Islands to Berwick-upon-Tweed"	11 February 2022

==== Fairlie to Isle of Lewis and Harris ====
In his fourth journey, Portillo explores the west coast of Scotland, starting in Fairlie and finishing in Lewis and Harris.

No.	Title	Original release date
16	"Fairlie to Port Glasgow"	14 February 2022
17	"Helensburgh to Connel"	15 February 2022
18	"Oban to Staffa"	16 February 2022
19	"Fort William to Glenfinnan"	17 February 2022
20	"Mallaig to Isle of Lewis and Harris"	18 February 2022

==== Avonmouth to Fishguard ====
Portillo's fifth journey takes him along Wales' southern coastline, beginning in Avonmouth and ending in Fishguard.

No.	Title	Original release date
21	"Avonmouth to Six Bells"	21 February 2022
22	"Barry Island to Pyle"	22 February 2022
23	"Port Talbot to Pembrey Burry Port"	23 February 2022
24	"Carmarthen to Pembroke"	24 February 2022
25	"Milford Haven to Fishguard"	25 February 2022

=== Series 2 (2023) ===
==== Douglas to Maryport ====
Portillo's sixth journey begins in the Isle of Man and then goes along the coast from Liverpool to Maryport in Cumbria.

No.	Title	Original release date
1	"Douglas to Port Erin"	22 May 2023
Portillo starts his exploration of the Isle of Man on a tram on the Manx Electric Railway, alighting at Douglas, where he is shown around the Legislative Buildings of the Tynwald (the Manx parliament), by its president. Transferring to the Isle of Man Steam Railway, he travels to Castletown station and participates in traditional Manx dancing at Castle Rushen. His next stop is Port St Mary to go scallop fishing. The last stop is Port Erin, where he learns about the Manx language.
2	"Liverpool to Blackpool"	23 May 2023
Portillo arrives in Liverpool on the Isle of Man Ferry and, after seeing the docks, he visits the International Slavery Museum. Then, from Liverpool Central, he crosses under the Mersey to Birkenhead Central to see the remains of a U-Boat. Returning to Liverpool, he visits a hidden control room which was the headquarters for the North Atlantic campaign of World War II. Next he visits Chinatown where he sees an arch gifted by Shanghai. He then departs from Liverpool Central for Crosby, where he sees Another Place, a sculpture by Anthony Gormley, followed by an interview with the artist. Portillo's last destination is Blackpool North to visit the Winter Gardens.
3	"Morecambe to Grange-over-Sands"	24 May 2023
Portillo alights at Morecambe to visit the bay, where he talks to a shrimp fisherman, who invites him back to his shrimp shop. Then he sees a statue of comedian Eric Morecambe, before travelling to Arnside to visit Levens Hall, where he sees examples of topiary. His last stop is Grange-over-Sands for visits to Cartmel Priory and the Nom de Plume restaurant.
4	"Ulverston to Ravenglass"	25 May 2023
Portillo alights at Ulverston and heads for Lake Windermere to learn about Arthur Ransome, the writer of Swallows and Amazons, followed by a sail on the lake. His next stop is Barrow-in-Furness where he walks up a slag heap and learns how these heaps could be used to absorb carbon dioxide from the atmosphere in the future. From this vantage point, he is able to see the factory where Britain's nuclear submarines are made. The next leg of his journey takes him to Silecroft to climb up Black Combe, where he meets an experienced fell runner. He then takes a ride on the 15-inch gauge Ravenglass and Eskdale Railway from Ravenglass to Dalegarth in the heart of the Lake District National Park.
5	"St Bees to Maryport"	26 May 2023
Portillo alights at St Bees where he meets a lifelong fan of Alfred Wainwright's guidebooks, and then takes the first steps along Wainwright's "Coast to Coast Walk". Returning to the railway, he travels to Whitehaven to visit Wils Hambling Butchers where he learns how to make Cumberland sausages. From Workington station, he travels four miles inland to Wordsworth House, where he learns about William Wordsworth. His last stop is Maryport to visit the banks of the Solway Firth, where he sees fishermen using traditional haaf nets.

==== Middlesbrough to Humberston Fitties ====
Portillo's seventh journey follows the coast from Middlesbrough, Yorkshire to Humberston Fitties in Lincolnshire.

No.	Title	Original release date
6	"Middlesbrough to Boulby"	29 May 2023
After alighting at Middlesbrough station, Portillo goes to see the Tees Transporter Bridge and takes the lift to the top of the bridge. He travels on to Saltholme, a 1000 acre wetland oasis run by the RSPB. His next stop is Redcar Central to visit the racecourse and meet former jockey Bob Champion. Back on the train, he next alights at Saltburn for the Boulby Underground Laboratory, 1km underground in an old potash mine, where he learns about particle physics and dark matter detectors. Returning to the surface, he sees recently mined polyhalite fertiliser being loaded onto a freight train, which he then takes a ride on.
7	"Whitby to Robin Hood's Bay"	30 May 2023
Arriving at Whitby, Portillo visits the Captain Cook Memorial Museum and sees a replica of his ship, HMS Endeavour. Next, he travels to Grosmont in the North York Moors National Park, where he attends the annual steam gala at the station on the North Yorkshire Moors Railway and sees Tornado, the first mainline steam locomotive to be built since 1960, and goes inside a signal box. Then he takes a train to Goathland where he hears how that station has often been used in film and television productions. He travels on to RAF Fylingdales, where he visits the control room and learns about its history. His last stop is Robin Hood's Bay, where he finds out about the historical smuggling that occurred in this locality and drinks a pint of porter in The Bay Hotel.
8	"Scarborough to Bridlington"	31 May 2023
Portillo's first stop is Scarborough, where he visits the ruins of Scarborough Castle and learns about the role it played in the English Civil War, and then, at the Rotunda Museum, he finds out about its designer, William Smith, who also created the first geological map of Great Britain. Down the coast at Caton Bay, he looks at exposed rock strata and fossils. His next stop is Bempton for Bempton Cliffs, where he sees how the police are protecting wildlife from disturbance. Returning to the railway, he travels on to Bridlington for the Yorkshire Marine Research Centre to see how lobsters are being observed in the laboratory and in the wild.
9	"Hornsea to Spurn Point"	1 June 2023
Portillo alights at Beverley and travels to Hornsea Museum on the coast, where he views examples of Hornsea pottery and has a go at creating contemporary pottery. From Beverley station, he takes the train to Hull to visit Hull F.C., where he learns about former Rugby League player, Clive Sullivan and meets young players at the club's academy. Next, he takes the train to Goole and travels 10 miles inland to Pollington Lock to ride on a working barge. Back on the coast, at Spurn Point, he visits the Humber Lifeboat Station, where he learns about life jackets and then sails on one of Britain's largest lifeboats.
10	"Grimsby to Humberston Fitties"	2 June 2023
Portillo alights at Grimsby Town to visit the east coast hub of the Danish energy firm Ørsted and learn about offshore wind farms, including talking to the crew of a wind turbine service boat. Returning to the railway, he passes Grimsby docks on the way to his next stop, Cleethorpes, where he visits and rides on the 15-inch gauge Cleethorpes Coast Light Railway, which takes him to The Signal Box Inn. On the beach, he meets a man who has swum across the Humber 70 times, and then goes for swim with a group of wild swimmers. Next day, he travels south to Humberston Fitties, a group of about 320 chalets built on a former salt marsh. Returning to Grimsby, he visits the Young's Seafood fish processing factory and finds out what scampi is.

==== Bellarena to Rosslare ====
Portillo's eighth journey begins at Lough Foyle in Northern Ireland and ends in Rosslare in the Republic of Ireland.

No.	Title	Original release date
11	"Bellarena to Giant's Causeway"	5 June 2023
Portillo arrives at Bellarena and visits the shores of Lough Foyle to see how new technology is being used to map the area. His next stop is Derry~Londonderry where, on the city walls, he learns about the city's history. Crossing into Catholic Bogside, he sees a collection of twelve street murals, known as the people's gallery, and meets two of its artists. Returning to the railway, he changes trains at Coleraine and then alights at Portrush for a boat trip to the place where a Spanish galleon was shipwrecked. He travels on east to Portballintrae where he talks to local teenagers about the activities which have helped them to appreciate the landscape, ending the day at the Giant's Causeway.
12	"Ballymena to Carrickfergus"	6 June 2023
From Ballymena Station, Portillo heads east to the coast, passing the volcanic Antrim Valley on the way, and learns of the local tradition of story telling. He then travels 30 miles south to continue his railway journey from Larne Town. After viewing Larne Lough from the train, he alights at Whitehead to visit the Whitehead Railway Museum and then participates in a rowing race. Taking the train to Carrickfergus, he visits Carrickfergus Castle and then interviews the Chief Executive of the Grand Orange Lodge of Ireland of the Orange Order, before seeing a re-enactment of a visit by William of Orange.
13	"Bangor to Belfast"	7 June 2023
Portillo's first stop is Bangor and on the marina, he hears how the city has been transformed by its recent festivals. He then travels to Sydenham, passing Belfast Lough on the way, to visit Stormont, the Irish parliament building; there, he meets politics professor Paul Bew, who received a peerage for his contribution to the Good Friday Agreement, and sees the room where it was signed, before meeting speaker of the parliament, Alex Maskey. Returning to the railway, he next alights at Lanyon Place to visit the Titanic Quarter, where he sees a large film studio. To cross Strangford Lough, he takes the ferry from Strangford to Portaferry, where he visits the Queen's University Marine Research Laboratory on the waterfront to hear about the potential of Tidal Power.
14	"Carlingford to Dublin"	8 June 2023
Setting off from Newry, Portillo crosses the border into both the Republic of Ireland and the EU. Alighting at Dundalk, he travels 15 miles along the banks of Carlingford Lough to see an oyster farm. Returning to the railway, he travels to Drogheda to visit the 5000-year-old Boyne Valley Tombs. Continuing south to Connolly station, he visits Dublin Castle and meets Éamon Ó Cuív, a Fianna Fáil politician and grandson of Éamon de Valera, the party's founder, who served as Irish President between 1959 and 1973. Portillo travels on to see the regeneration of the docks area on the River Liffey, before taking the Dublin Area Rapid Transit (DART) to Silicon Docks to visit Dogpatch Labs, a startup and innovation hub.
15	"Dun Laoghaire to Rosslare"	9 June 2023
Portillo alights at Dun Laoghaire and learns about the Geological Survey of Ireland before sailing on one of their seabed survey vessels, observing a sonar device. On the DART, he travels to Sandycove and Glasthule station to see the area which inspired James Joyce whilst he was writing Ulysses: Portillo sees Joyce Tower, a former Martello tower now converted into a museum, and visits Sweny's Pharmacy, featured in the novel. Returning to the main line, he alights at Wexford station and proceeds to Ireland's only inland port, New Ross, to see a replica of the Dunbrody, the original ship which transported emigrants to North America during the great famine. After seeing a visitor centre dedicated to the Kennedy family, he catches a train from Wexford to Rosslare, where he visits the docks and hears how the port has changed following Brexit.

==== Weymouth to Seaford ====
Portillo's ninth journey is along England's south coast, beginning in Weymouth and ending in Seaford.

No.	Title	Original release date
16	"Weymouth to Lulworth"	12 June 2023
Portillo's first stop is Weymouth and from the station he heads for the beach, and then visits the Isle of Portland. He goes on to Portland Harbour and, at the Weymouth & Portland National Sailing Academy, he discovers why Weymouth is ideal for sailing. After visiting Chesil Beach, he sees the swannery near Abbotsbury. Rejoining the train at Weymouth, his next destination is Dorchester where he visits the Shire Hall to inspect the cells of the Old Court House where the Tolpuddle Martyrs were held and hear how their actions led to the legalisation of Trade Unions. His next stop is Wool to see Worbarrow Bay, before going inland to visit the abandoned village of Tyneham. He moves on to the top of Lulworth Ranges and learns that it is not only a crucial military facility, but also an important home to wildlife.
17	"Kimmeridge to Brownsea Island"	13 June 2023
Alighting at Wareham, Portillo heads for Kimmeridge Bay to visit an oil production site. At Swanage he takes a walk around the seafront, before going to the station where he takes the train on the Swanage Railway to Corfe Castle. After looking around the station, he then takes the train back to Wareham. Now, back on the main line, he travels to Poole and goes to see the harbour. Next he visits the manufacturing head quarters of the global cosmetics firm, Lush to see how seaweed is being used in both cosmetic and bathing products. Then he makes his way to Sandbanks, where he meets former football manager, Harry Redknapp. At the end of the peninsula, he watches the chain ferry depart for Studland, before taking the boat to Brownsea Island. On the island he visits Brownsea Castle and learns about Mary Bonham-Christie, who bought the island in 1927. He finishes this leg of his journey by going into the woods to observe red squirrels.
18	"Southampton to Isle of Wight"	14 June 2023
Portillo arrives at Southampton Central and goes to see a surviving part of the medieval walls. At the National Oceanography Centre, he sees unmanned automatic submarines and visits the microplastics laboratory. Next, he takes the Red Funnel ferry to East Cowes, on the Isle of Wight, and makes his way to Ryde where he walks to the end of the pier. He then takes the train from Ryde Pier Head to Ryde St John's Road to visit the Ryde Traincare Depot, where he sees refurbished London Underground trains which are used on the island services. Next, he goes to Havenstreet Station to ride on the Isle of Wight Steam Railway, alighting at Wootton to visit the Isle of Wight Garlic Farm. In the far west of the island, close to The Needles, at the High Down Rocket Test Site, he learns about the British Cold War rocket programme, and, in the underground mission control, sees a model of Prospero, Britain's first satellite. Potillo had spent summer holidays on the Isle of Wight as a child, and in an interview for The Times, recalled with enthusiasm journeys on the Isle of Wight Railway between Ryde and Ventnor.
19	"Lee-on-the-Solent to Bosham"	15 June 2023
Portillo alights at Fareham for Lee-on-the-Solent to visit the H M Coastguard Training Centre, where he participates in a rescue exercise. Back on the main line, his next stop is Portsmouth Harbour, where he sees HMS Victory before meeting the Queen's Harbour Master. Next he goes on board the aircraft carrier, HMS Prince of Wales, where he sees the propulsion units and goes onto the bridge. His last stop is Bosham to see Holy Trinity Church, which was depicted in the Bayeux Tapestry. Then at Chichester Harbour he finds out how the landscape is being managed as an important bird sanctuary.
20	"Fishbourne to Seaford"	16 June 2023
Portillo's next stop is Fishbourne, to visit the remains of a Roman Palace where he sees some elaborate mosaics. Next he travels to Brighton station, where he is impressed by its Victorian architecture. On the beach, he meets actress and writer Carol Harrison, who talks about the fighting which occurred between mods and rockers on Brighton beach in 1964. Portillo then visits Jump The Gun Boutique, which specialises in early 1960s menswear and selects a suit for himself. After enjoying the view from the top of the observation tower i360, he overnights at The Twenty One bed and breakfast. Returning to the railway, the train takes him alongside the River Ouse to Seaford station and from there he travels to the eastern end of the South Downs National Park for the Rathfinny Wine Estate, where he visits the winery and samples the wine.

=== Series 3 (2024) ===
==== Axminster to the Isles of Scilly ====
No.	Title	Original release date
1	"Axminster to Budleigh Salterton"	8 April 2024
Portillo alights at Axminster station and travels to Lyme Regis, on the Jurassic Coast, to learn about the discoveries of pioneering palaeontologist Mary Anning. Then he explores the 40-acre Beer Quarry Caves, which have been active for two millennia. Returning to the railway, his next stop is Pinhoe, on the eastern edge of Exeter, to visit the headquarters of the Meteorological Office, where he sees how a new super computer can create both weather forecasts and predictions about climate change, and tries his hand at presenting a television weather forecast. Next, he takes the train from Topsham to visit Otterton, where he sees a 1,000-year-old water mill and discovers that flour is still ground there, and, in the neighbouring bakery, he samples a scone made from that flour and eaten Devon-style, with cream topped with jam.
2	"Exeter to Plymouth"	9 April 2024
Portillo alights at Exeter St Davids for Exeter Cathedral where he visits the stone mason's workshop. On the rooftop, he finds out about the ongoing restoration work. Next, he enters the network of tunnels known as the Exeter Passages, which were originally built to supply the cathedral with water. In the Cathedral Library, he sees the Exeter Book which contains Old English poetry. Back on the railway, he travels along the coast and crosses the Blackford Viaduct before arriving in Plymouth. At Plymouth University he meets Deborah Greaves, the director of the Coastal, Ocean and Sediment Transport Laboratory, and is shown a prototype floating wind turbine. In the harbour, he sees an autonomous boat before visiting the Tamar Bridge.
3	"Tintagel to St Austell"	10 April 2024
Portillo crosses the River Tamar into Cornwall via Brunel's Royal Albert Bridge. He alights at Bodmin Parkway to explore Cornwall's Atlantic coast and to visit Tintagel Castle, where he learns about the castle's origins. Then he travels south to the 18th-century landscaped park of Boconnoc where he meets artist and environmental campaigner Kurt Jackson. After travelling to Newquay, he eats a crab sandwich before heading to St Agnes where, on a headland above the village, he listens to the Aggie Boys Choir perform sea shanties. Next he boards a train for St Austell to visit the Lost Gardens of Heligan, where he is shown a Victorian kitchen garden.
4	"St Mawes to Porthcurno"	11 April 2024
Portillo alights at Falmouth Docks Station for the coastal village of St Mawes to visit the Hotel Tresanton, where he meets hotelier and interior designer, Olga Polizzi. Then he sails in a wooden racing yacht. Continuing from Falmouth Docks on a branch line, he alights at Penryn and travels along The Lizard to Coverack where he joins members of the Cornish Seaweed Company on a harvesting mission. Next he rides on the footplate of the Helston Railway and alights at Truthall Halt to see the granite Gover Viaduct. His final stop is Penzance to visit the open air Minack Theatre at Porthcurno.
5	"Isles of Scilly"	12 April 2024
Portillo takes the helicopter from Penzance Heliport to Tresco in the Isles of Scilly. Here he visits Tresco Abbey Gardens and learns about its founder, Augustus Smith. Then he takes a boat to Hugh Town on St Mary's, the largest and most populated of the Isles of Scilly. Here Michael meets former councillor, Amanda Martin, to learn about life on the islands. On the north of the island he sees the bronze age Bant's Carn Burial Chamber and meets archaeologist Catherine Sawyer. Then they visit the nearby ruins of an ancient village. After having a go at rowing in a type of boat known as a gig, Portillo watches a gig race.

==== Cardigan Bay to Colwyn Bay ====
No.	Title	Original release date
6	"Cardigan Bay to Abergynolwyn"	15 April 2024
Portillo starts this journey with a ride on the Aberystwyth Cliff Railway and then, from a boat in Cardiagan Bay, observes Bottlenose dolphins . Next he takes the train from Aberystwyth to Borth. On Borth beach he sees a petrified forest and learns about Welsh mythology. He then continues north to Machynlleth where, in Parliament House, he hears how Owain Glyndŵr led a rebellion against English rule. His next stop is Tywyn and from Tywyn Wharf railway station he rides on the Talyllyn Railway, the oldest heritage railway in the world, before alighting at Abergynolwyn.
7	"Harlech to Aberdaron"	16 April 2024
8	"Porthmadog to Anglesey"	17 April 2024
9	"The Isle of Anglesey"	18 April 2024
10	"Conwy to Colwyn Bay"	19 April 2024
Portillo travels by train along the North Wales coast, and his first stop is Conwy, where he visits the World Heritage Site of Conwy Castle and talks to historian and author David Pilling about the Conquest of Wales by Edward I, and the role of the castle in subduing the Welsh. Moving into the foothills of the Carneddau mountains, he speaks to local sheep farmer Gareth Wyn Jones, who takes him to see the semi-feral Carneddau ponies. Next, Portillo visits Llandudno, and travels by funicular railway on the Great Orme Tramway to the top of the Great Orme, where mining archeologist Alan Williams takes him on a tour of the extensive Bronze Age copper mine underneath the headland. Finally alighting at Colwyn Bay, he discusses the regeneration of the town's sea front with project manager Benji Poulton, who tells him about the replacement of the beach and restoration of the Victorian promenade.

==== Eastbourne to Chatham ====
No.	Title	Original release date
11	"Eastbourne to Rye"	22 April 2024
12	"Folkestone to Le Touquet"	23 April 2024
Portillo travels from Folkestone through the Channel Tunnel in the cab of a LeShuttle train. In Calais, he notes the English Gothic architecture of the 14th-century "Church of Our Lady", and sees Auguste Rodin's bronze sculpture The Burghers of Calais, which commemorates the treaty ending the Siege of Calais in 1346–1347 by Edward III. In the belfry of Calais City Hall, he hears about the emigration of British lacemakers from Nottinghamshire to the city in the 19th century and visits Darquer & Méry, the oldest working lace factory in Calais, and sees the machines in operation. Portillo then takes the train from Calais-Ville to Boulogne-sur-Mer, and at La Matelote restaurant, he cooks a traditional local fish stew, Gainée. Travelling by train from Boulogne-Ville to Étaples-Le Touquet, he visits the resort town of Le Touquet, where he learns that Ian Fleming spent several summers in the town and is said to have created the character of James Bond there, noting the similarity of the local casino to that described in Fleming's book Casino Royale. Portillo ends his journey in the bar of the Westminster hotel, where actor Sean Connery signed his first contract to play Bond on screen.
13	"Dover to Margate"	24 April 2024
14	"Birchington-on-Sea to Whitstable"	25 April 2024
15	"Faversham to Chatham"	26 April 2024

==== Canvey Island to The Wash ====
No.	Title	Original release date
16	"Canvey Island to Wrabness"	29 April 2024
17	"Woodbridge to Southwold"	30 April 2024
18	"Lowestoft to Great Yarmouth"	1 May 2024
19	"West Runton to Burnham Market"	2 May 2024
20	"Wells-next-the-Sea to The Wash"	3 May 2024

== See also ==
- Great Railway Journeys
