= Great Railway Journeys =

British TV series (1980–1999)

- Title screen for most episodes from Series 2 onward.
- Country of origin: United Kingdom
- Original language: English
- No. of episodes: 27

Production
- Running time: 50 or 60 min

Original release
- Network: BBC Two
- Release: 23 October 1980 – 6 April 1999

Related
- Great British Railway Journeys

Great Railway Journeys, originally titled Great Railway Journeys of the World, is a recurring series of travel documentaries produced by BBC Television. The premise of each programme is that the presenter, typically a well-known figure from the arts or media, would make a journey by train, usually through a country or to a destination to which they had a personal connection. The first series, which used the longer title, was broadcast on BBC2 in 1980. After a 14-year hiatus, a further three series were broadcast between 1994 and 1999, using the shorter series title. Similar series were broadcast in 1983, Great Little Railways, and 2010, Great British Railway Journeys.

The first series featured the first television travelogue by comedian and comic actor Michael Palin ("Confessions of a Trainspotter"), who later presented a number of travel series starting with Around the World in 80 Days with Michael Palin in 1989.

== Series ==
=== Series 1: Great Railway Journeys of the World (1980) ===
Episode summary for Series 1:

Episode no.	Episode title	UK broadcast date	Presenter	Details of journey	Countries visited
#1.0	Introduction (extracts from forthcoming episodes in the series)	1980-10-23	-	-	-
#1.1	"Coast to Coast"	1980-10-30	Ludovic Kennedy	New York City to Los Angeles	United States
#1.2	"The Long Straight"	1980-11-06	Michael Frayn	Sydney to Perth	Australia
#1.3	"Deccan"	1980-11-13	Brian Thompson	Bombay to Cochin	India
#1.4	"Confessions of a Trainspotter"	1980-11-27	Michael Palin	London to the Kyle of Lochalsh	England, Scotland
#1.5	"Zambezi Express"	1980-12-04	Michael Wood	Cape Town to Victoria Falls	South Africa, Botswana, Zimbabwe-Rhodesia
#1.6	"Three Miles High"	1980-12-11	Miles Kington	Lima to La Paz	Peru, Bolivia
#1.7	"Changing Trains"	1980-12-18	Eric Robson	Paris to Budapest	France, Switzerland, Austria, Hungary

=== Series 2: Great Railway Journeys (1994) ===
Episode summary for Series 2:

Episode no.	Episode title	UK broadcast date	Presenter	Countries visited
#2.1	"Hong Kong to Ulaanbaatar"	1994-01-13	Clive Anderson	Hong Kong, China, Mongolia
#2.2	"Cape Town to The Lost City"	1994-01-20	Rian Malan	South Africa
#2.3	"St. Petersburg to Tashkent"	1994-01-27	Natalia Makarova	Russia, Uzbekistan
#2.4	"Derry to Kerry"	1994-02-03	Michael Palin	Northern Ireland, Republic of Ireland
#2.5	"Santos to Santa Cruz"	1994-02-10	Lisa St Aubin de Terán	Brazil, Bolivia
#2.6	"Karachi to The Khyber Pass"	1994-02-17	Mark Tully	Pakistan

=== Series 3: Great Railway Journeys (1996) ===
Episode summary for Series 3:

Episode no.	Episode title	UK broadcast date	Presenter	Countries visited
#3.1	"Crewe to Crewe"	1996-09-04	Victoria Wood	United Kingdom
#3.2	"Aleppo to Aqaba"	1996-09-11	Alexei Sayle	Syria, Jordan
#3.3	"Great Zimbabwe to Kilimatinde"	1996-09-18	Henry Louis Gates Jr.	Zimbabwe, Zambia, Tanzania
#3.4	"The High Andes to Patagonia"	1996-09-25	Buck Henry	Argentina
#3.5	"Mombasa to the Mountains of the Moon"	1996-10-02	Benedict Allen	Kenya, Uganda
#3.6	"London to Arcadia"	1996-10-09	Ben Okri	England, France, Switzerland, Italy, Greece
#3.7	"Halifax to Porteau Cove"	1996-10-16	Chris Bonington	Canada

=== Series 4: Great Railway Journeys (1999) ===
Episode summary for Series 4:

Episode No.	Episode title	UK broadcast date	Presenter	Countries visited
#4.1	"India East to West"	1999-01-05	Ian Hislop	India
#4.2	"Granada to Salamanca"	1999-01-12	Michael Portillo	Spain
#4.3	"Tokyo to Kagoshima"	1999-01-19	Fergal Keane	Japan
#4.4	"Los Mochis to Veracruz"	1999-01-26	Rick Stein	Mexico
#4.5	"Guantanamo to Pinar del Rio"	1999-02-02	Nick Hancock	Cuba
#4.6	"St Louis to Dogon Country"	1999-02-09	Danny Glover	Senegal, Mali
#4.7	"Singapore to Bangkok"	1999-04-06	Stephen Tompkinson	Singapore, Malaysia, Thailand

=== Great Little Railways ===
In 1983, the BBC made a further series on rail travel entitled Great Little Railways, this time exclusively featuring narrow gauge railways. This series relied on narrators rather than presenters who appeared on camera. In some cases, the narrator did not partake in the train journey, and read the writing of that episode's producer.

Episode no.	Episode title	UK broadcast date	Narrator	Writer	Details of journey	Countries visited
1	"The Gold Rush Line"	1983-02-15	Simon Hoggart	Simon Hoggart	White Pass and Yukon Route	Alaska, US and Yukon, Canada
2	"The Other Poland"	1983-02-22	Brian Blessed	Lyn Webster	Nasielsk to Pułtusk & Komańcza to Cisna	Poland
3	"Slow Train to Olympia"	1983-03-01	Michael Wood	Michael Wood	Athens to Olympia	Greece
4	"The Dragons of Sugar Island"	1983-03-08	Colin Garratt	Colin Garratt	Negros Island	Philippines
5	"Line of Dreams"	1983-03-15	John Shrapnel	Gerry Troyna	Jodhpur and Jaipur	India
6	"Journey to the Land Beyond the Mountains"	1983-03-22	Ray Gosling	Ray Gosling	Douro Valley (including the Corgo line)	Portugal
7	"The Good and The Quick"	1983-03-29	Stanley Reynolds	Stanley Reynolds	Guayaquil to Quito	Ecuador

== Great British Railway Journeys ==
From January 2010, BBC Two broadcast Great British Railway Journeys, a documentary with a similar idea to Great Railway Journeys but a different format.

Journeys are mainly focused on Great Britain, but occasionally venturing onto railways in Ireland under the title Great British Railway Journeys Goes to Ireland. The programmes are presented by the ex-politician and broadcaster Michael Portillo. The first series detailed four railway journeys following an 1840 Bradshaw's Guide, split into a run of 20 separate episodes. A second series followed a year later.

By 2025, 16 series had been made, totalling 290 episodes.

== Great Continental Railway Journeys ==
From 2012, BBC Two also broadcast series of Great Continental Railway Journeys, documentaries with the same idea as Great British Railway Journeys, also presented by Portillo. It follows railway journeys in mainland Europe, following a 1913 Bradshaw's guide to European rail travel.

Other similar series followed: Great American Railway Journeys in 2016; Great Indian Railway Journeys in 2018; Great Alaskan Railroad Journeys, Great Canadian Railway Journeys, and Great Australian Railway Journeys in 2019; and Great Asian Railway Journeys in 2020.

== Media ==
Although there have been no complete series of Great Railway Journeys released on DVD, Michael Palin's 1980 and 1994 programmes are available individually (BBCDVD1626) and as part of a box set of his collected travel documentaries, The Michael Palin Collection (BBCDVD2214). All seven of the 1980 Series 1 programs, including Palin's "Confessions of a Train Spotter", were released in 1986 in cooperation with the BBC on VHS tapes by Pentrex, a California railroad video company. They are now long out-of-print, but occasionally are offered from online sellers. The six episodes of 1994's Series 2 were also released on VHS. Often available in a six-pack of programmes, though also out-of-print, they are commonly found for purchase online. In 2020, the BBC made series 2 available on the BBC iPlayer, followed by most episodes of series 4 in 2024.

Books have been published to accompany the first three series, with a chapter by each of the presenters on their particular journey:

- Frayn, M. et al. (1981), Great Railway Journeys of the World, BBC Books, hardcover, ISBN 0-563-17903-1
- Anderson, C. et al. (1994), Great Railway Journeys, BBC Books, hardcover, ISBN 0-563-36944-2
- Allen, B. et al. (1996), More Great Railway Journeys, BBC Books, hardcover, ISBN 0-563-38717-3

A similar book was also published on Great Little Railways:

- Chamberlin, E.R. et al. (1984) Great Little Railways, BBC Books, hardcover, ISBN 0-563-20211-4
