= George Bradshaw =

British engraver and publisher (1800–1853)

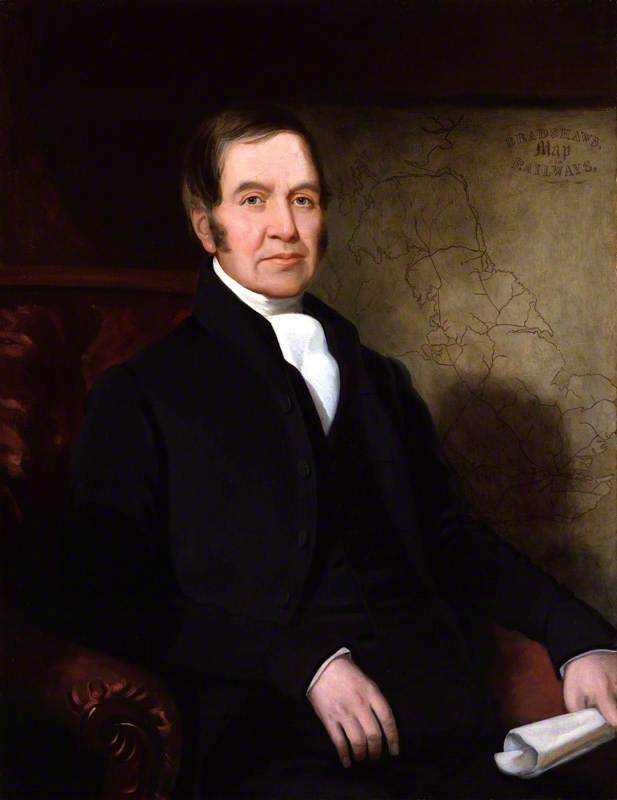
- Portrait of George Bradshaw by Richard Evans, 1841
- Born: 29 July 1800; Windsor Bridge, Pendleton, Lancashire, England
- Died: 6 September 1853 (aged 53); Oslo, Norway
- Known for: Bradshaw's guides and timetables
- Children: 5

George Bradshaw (29 July 1800 – 6 September 1853) was an English cartographer, engraver, printer and publisher. A devout Quaker, he developed Bradshaw's Guide, a widely sold series of combined railway guides and timetables.

== Biography ==
Bradshaw was born at Windsor Bridge, Pendleton, in Salford, Lancashire. On leaving school he was apprenticed to an engraver named Beale in Manchester, and in 1820 he set up his own engraving business in Belfast, returning to Manchester in 1822 to set up as an engraver and printer, principally of maps.

He was a religious man. Although his parents were not exceptionally wealthy, when he was young they enabled him to take lessons from a minister devoted to the teachings of Emanuel Swedenborg. He joined the Society of Friends (the Quakers) and gave a considerable part of his time to philanthropic work. He worked a great deal with radical reformers such as Richard Cobden in organising peace conferences and in setting up schools and soup kitchens for the poor of Manchester.

It is his belief as a Quaker that is quoted as causing the early editions of Bradshaw's guides to have avoided using the names of months based upon Roman deities which was seen as "pagan" usage. Quaker usage was, and sometimes still is, "First month" for January, "Second month" for February and so on. Days of the week were "First day" for Sunday and so on.

In 1841, he founded a high-quality weekly magazine, edited by George Falkner, called Bradshaw's Manchester Journal, described as "a 16-page miscellany of art, science and literature, to sell at the cheap price of a penny-halfpenny a week. ... After the first six months, it was renamed Bradshaw’s Journal: A Miscellany of Literature, Science and Art, and the place of publication moved to London, where the title was taken on by William Strange", but the journal survived only until 1843.

He married Martha Derbyshire on 15 May 1839 and they had six children. While touring Norway in 1853, he contracted cholera and died in Kristiana (now Oslo) on 6 September, a mere 8 hours after first showing symptoms of the disease. As a local law prohibited the return of his body to England, he was interred in the Gamlebyen cemetery, about a mile from Oslo Cathedral. His gravestone is on the left by the gate near Oslo hospital.

The George Bradshaw room at Friends House, London, is named after him.

== Bradshaw's railway guides ==
Bradshaw's was a series of railway timetables and travel guide books published by W. J. Adams of London. George Bradshaw initiated the series in 1839. The Bradshaw's range of titles continued after his death in 1853, with the final monthly edition being published in 1961.

== In popular media ==
Former British politician Michael Portillo used a copy of what was described as a Bradshaw's guide (the 1863 edition of Bradshaw's Descriptive Railway Hand-Book of Great Britain and Ireland) for Great British Railway Journeys, a BBC Two television series in which he travelled across Britain, visiting recommended points of interest noted in Bradshaw's guide book, and where possible staying in recommended hotels.

The first series was broadcast in early 2010, and the series has returned annually. The success of the series sparked a new interest in the guides and facsimile copies of the 1863 edition became an unexpected best seller in the UK in 2011. In the 14th episode of series 2, "Batley to Sheffield", Portillo met a great-great-granddaughter of George Bradshaw, who showed him part of the family archive.

At the end of 2012, a new series, Great Continental Railway Journeys, was broadcast with Portillo using the 1913 edition of Bradshaw's Continental Railway Guide to make journeys through various European countries and territories, prompting two publishers to produce facsimiles of the handbook. A second series was broadcast in 2013. Further series covered Asia, Australia and India.

== See also ==
- George Samuel Measom, publisher of railway guides
- Bradshaw's Guide to Victoria (Australia)

== Sources ==
- Milligan, Edward H. (2007). British Quakers in Commerce & Industry 1775-1920. York: Sessions Book Trust. p. 61. ISBN 9781850723677.
