= Bradshaws =

Bradshaws or Bradshaw's can refer to:

- The Bradshaws, British fictional radio serial
- Bradshaw's Guide, a series of railway timetables and travel guide books
- Bradshaw's Guide to Victoria (Australia)
- Bradshaw's Ferry, crossing point on the Colorado River

== Deprecated usage ==
- Bradshaw rock paintings was the colonial name for Gwion Gwion rock paintings
