= Bradshaw's Guide =

Series of railway timetables and travel guide books

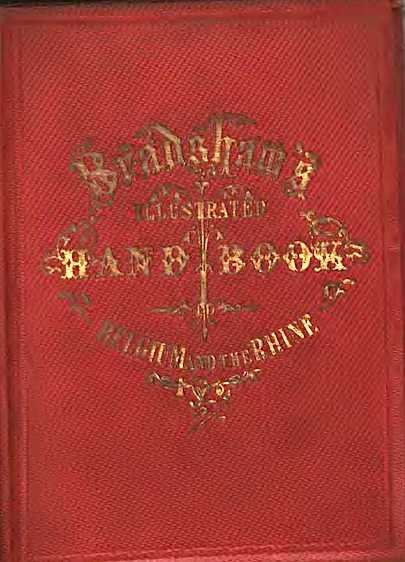
Bradshaw's Illustrated Hand-Book for Travellers in Belgium, 1856

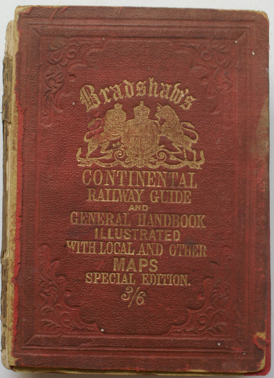
Bradshaw's Continental Railway Guide, 1891

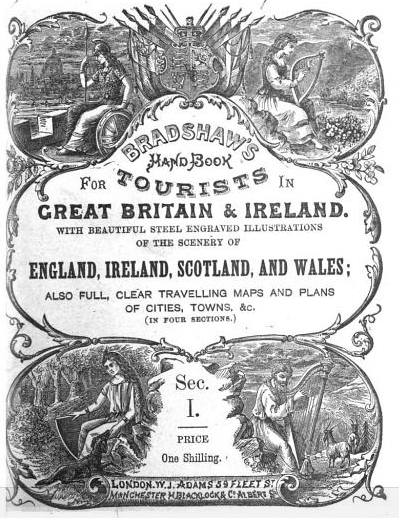
Bradshaw's Handbook for Tourists in Great Britain and Ireland, 1882

Bradshaw's was a series of railway timetables and travel guide books published by W.J. Adams and later Henry Blacklock, both of London. They are named after founder George Bradshaw, who produced his first timetable in October 1839. Although Bradshaw died in 1853, the range of titles bearing his name (and commonly referred to by that alone) continued to expand for the remainder of the 19th and early part of the 20th century, covering at various times Continental Europe, India, Australia and New Zealand, as well as parts of the Middle-East. They survived until May 1961, when the final monthly edition of the British guide was produced. The British and Continental guides were referred to extensively by presenter Michael Portillo in his multiple television series. (Note: Including the Great British Railway Journeys, Great Continental Railway Journeys, Great American Railroad Journeys, Great Indian Railway Journeys, Great Alaskan Railroad Journeys, Great Canadian Railway Journeys, Great Australian Railway Journeys and Great Asian Railway Journeys.)

== Early history ==
Bradshaw's name was already known as the publisher of Bradshaw's Maps of Inland Navigation, which detailed the canals of Lancashire and Yorkshire, when, on 19 October 1839, soon after the introduction of railways, his Manchester company published the world's first compilation of railway timetables. The cloth-bound book was entitled Bradshaw's Railway Time Tables and Assistant to Railway Travelling and cost sixpence. In 1840 the title was changed to Bradshaw's Railway Companion, and the price raised to one shilling. A new volume was issued at occasional intervals and from time to time a supplement kept this up to date. The original Bradshaw publications were published before the limited introduction of standardised Railway time in November 1840, and its subsequent development into standard time. The accompanying map of all lines in operation (and some "in progress") in England and Wales, is cited as being the world's first national railway map.

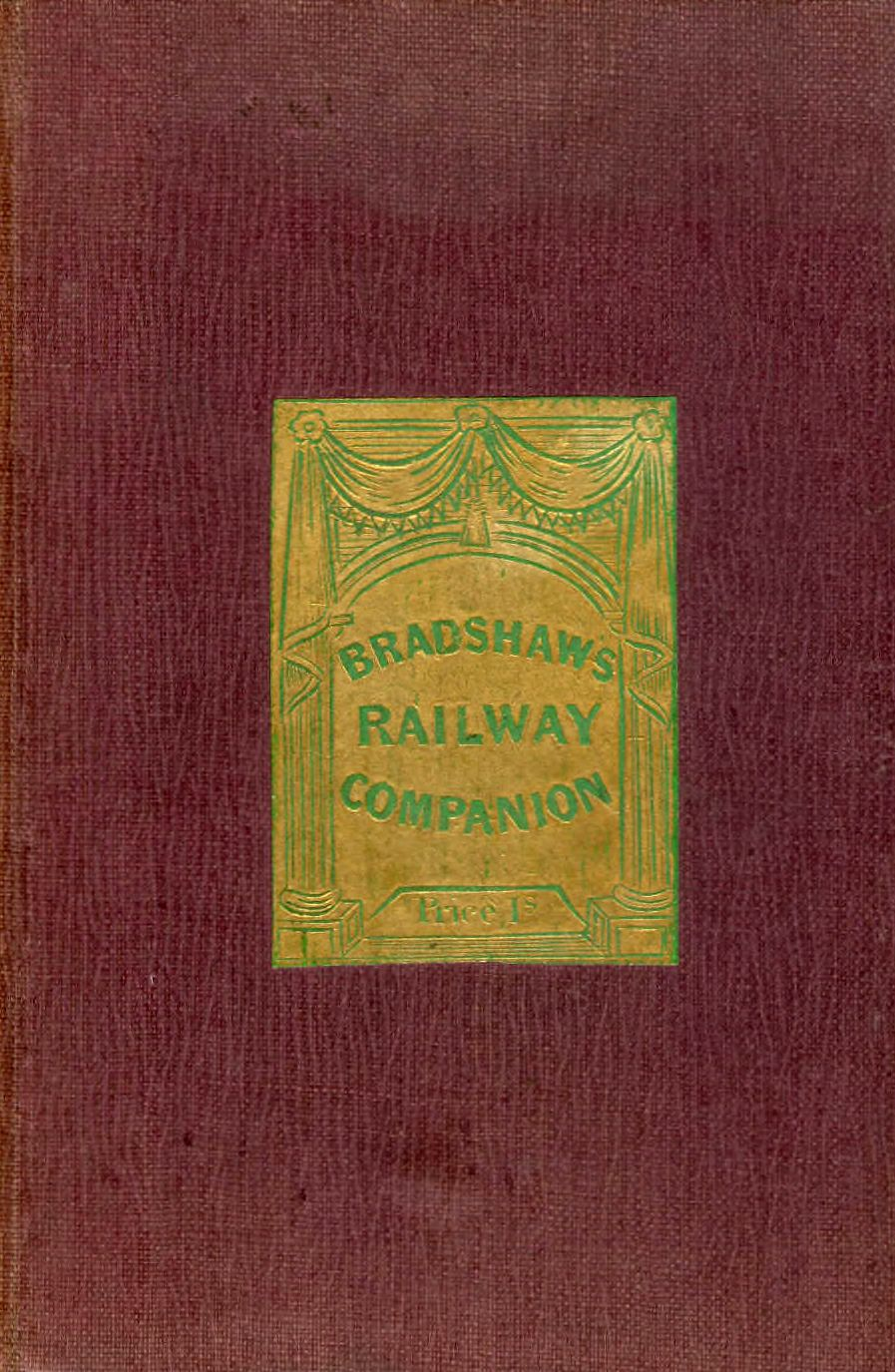
Cover from the third issue of Bradshaw's Railway Companion from 1839.

In December 1841, acting on a suggestion made by his London agent, William Jones Adams, Bradshaw reduced the price to the original sixpence, and began to issue the guides monthly under the title Bradshaw's Monthly Railway Guide. Many railway companies were unhappy with Bradshaw's timetable, but Bradshaw was able to circumvent this by becoming a railway shareholder and by putting his case at company AGMs. Soon the book, in the familiar yellow wrapper, became synonymous with its publisher: for Victorians and Edwardians alike, a railway timetable was "a Bradshaw", no matter by which railway company it had been issued, or whether Bradshaw had been responsible for its production or not.

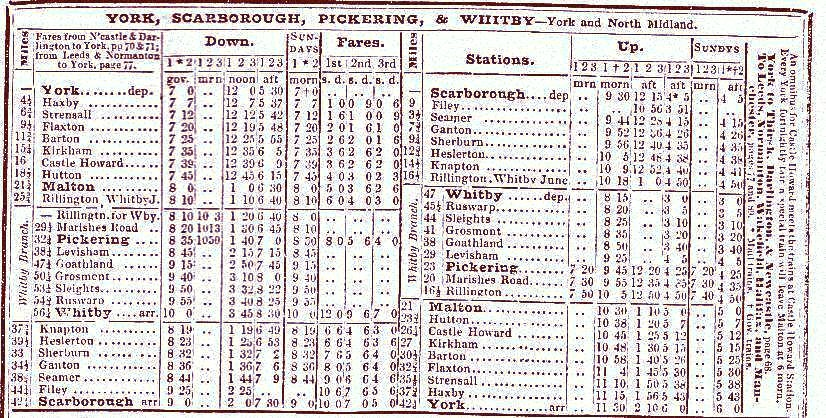
Timetable from the 1850 Bradshaw

The eight-page edition of 1841 had grown to 32 pages by 1845 and to 946 pages by 1898 and now included maps, illustrations and descriptions of the main features and historic buildings of the towns served by the railways. In April 1845, the issue number jumped from 40 to 141: the publisher claimed this was an innocent mistake, although it has been speculated as a commercial ploy, where more advertising revenue could be generated by making it look longer-established than it really was. Whatever the reason for the change, the numbering continued from 141.

When in 1865, Punch praised Bradshaw's publications, it stated that "seldom has the gigantic intellect of man been employed upon a work of greater utility." At last, some order had been imposed on the chaos that had been created by some 150 rail companies whose tracks criss-crossed the country and whose largely uncoordinated network was rapidly expanding. Bradshaw minutely recorded all changes and became the standard manual for rail travel well into the 20th century.

By 1918 Bradshaw's guide had risen in price to two shillings and by 1937 to half a crown (equivalent to £7 in 2025).

== Later history ==
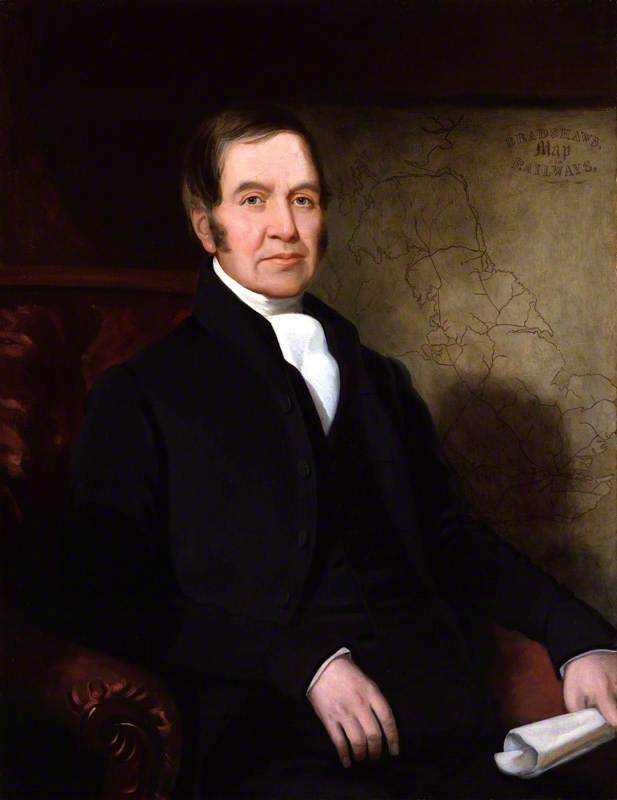
Portrait of George Bradshaw by Richard Evans, 1841

Bradshaw's timetables became less necessary from 1923, when more than 100 surviving companies were "grouped" into the Big Four. This change reduced dramatically the range and number of individual timetables produced by the companies themselves. They now published a much smaller number of substantial compilations which between them covered the country.

Between 1923 and 1939, three of the Big Four transferred their timetable production to Bradshaw's publisher Henry Blacklock & Co., and most of the official company timetables therefore became reprints of the relevant pages from Bradshaw. Only the Great Western Railway retained its own format.

Between the two world wars, the verb 'to Bradshaw' was a derogatory term used in the Royal Air Force to refer to pilots who could not navigate well, perhaps related to a perceived lack of ability shown by those who navigated by following railway lines.

When the railways were nationalised in 1948, five of the six British Railways Regions followed the companies' example by using Blacklock to produce their timetable books, but production was eventually moved to other publishers. This change must have reduced Blacklock's revenue substantially. Parts of Bradshaw's guide began to be reset in the newer British Railways style from 1955, but modernisation of the whole volume was never completed. By 1961 Bradshaw cost 12s 6d (62½p), and a complete set of BR Regional timetables could be bought for 6s (30p).

The conclusion was inevitable, and the last edition, No. 1521, was dated May 1961. The Railway Magazine of that month printed a valedictory article by Charles E. Lee.

Reprints of various Bradshaw's guides have been produced.

== References in literature ==
19th-century and early 20th-century novelists make frequent references to a character's "Bradshaw". Dickens refers to it in his short stories "The Portrait-Painter's Story" (1861) and "Mrs Lirriper's Lodgings" (1863), so does Trollope in “He knew he was right” (1869). In Jules Verne's Around the World in 80 Days, Phileas Fogg carries a Bradshaw. In W. Somerset Maugham's "The Book Bag" the narrator states "I would sooner read the catalogue of the Army and Navy Stores or Bradshaw's Guide than nothing at all, and indeed have spent many delightful hours over both these works"

Crime writers were fascinated with trains and timetables, especially as a new source of alibis. Examples are Ronald Knox's The Footsteps at the Lock (1928) and novels by Freeman Wills Crofts. One mention is by Sir Arthur Conan Doyle in the Sherlock Holmes story The Valley of Fear: "the vocabulary of Bradshaw is nervous and terse, but limited." Other references include another Sherlock Holmes story, "The Adventure of the Copper Beeches"; Lewis Carroll's long poem Phantasmagoria; and Bram Stoker's Dracula, which makes note of Count Dracula reading an "English Bradshaw's Guide" as part of his planning for his voyage to England. In the 1866 comic opera Cox and Box, the following exchange takes place:

BOX: Have you read this month's Bradshaw, sir?
COX: No, sir. My wife wouldn't let me.

There is also a reference in Death in the Clouds (1935) by Agatha Christie: "Mr Clancy, writer of detective stories ... extracted a Continental Bradshaw from his raincoat pocket ... to work out a complicated alibi." Bradshaw is also mentioned in her novel The Secret Adversary. In Daphne du Maurier's Rebecca (1938), the second Mrs de Winter observes that "Some people have a vice of reading Bradshaws. They plan innumerable journeys across country for the fun of linking up impossible connections." (chapter 2). Another reference is in an aside in The Riddle of the Sands (1903) by Erskine Childers: "... an extraordinary book, Bradshaw, turned to from habit, even when least wanted, as men fondle guns and rods in the close season."

In G. K. Chesterton's The Man Who Was Thursday, the protagonist Gabriel Syme praises Bradshaw as a poet of order: "No, take your books of mere poetry and prose; let me read a time table, with tears of pride. Take your Byron, who commemorates the defeats of man; give me Bradshaw, who commemorates his victories. Give me Bradshaw, I say!" In Max Beerbohm's Zuleika Dobson (1911), a satirical fantasy of Oxford undergraduates, a Bradshaw is listed as one of the two books in the "library" of the irresistible Zuleika.

Anthony Trollope refers to Bradshaw's in Barchester Towers and The Warden.

Bradshaw is mentioned in modern novels with a period setting, and in Philip Pullman's The Shadow in the North (Sally Lockhart Quartet).

In Jerome K. Jerome's 1891 novel Diary of a Pilgrimage, contains an aside called A Faithful Bradshaw. This section describes a comical incident where the author always gets misled by referring to outdated guides.

In the Terry Pratchett Discworld novel “Raising Steam,” Moist Von Lipwig meets a Mrs. Georgina Bradshaw who subsequently begins writing guides to rail destinations for the Ankh-Morpork and Sto Lat Hygienic Railway.

== Bradshaw's Continental Railway Guide ==
In June 1847 the first number of Bradshaw's Continental Railway Guide was issued, giving the timetables of the Continental railways. It grew to over 1,000 pages, including timetables, guidebook and hotel directory. It was discontinued in 1914 at the outbreak of the First World War. Briefly resurrected in the interwar years, it saw its final edition in 1939.

The 1913 edition was republished in September 2012. Michael Portillo presented a travel documentary series named Great Continental Railway Journeys which also marked the hundredth anniversary of the 1913 publication.

== Bradshaw's and other printed timetables today ==
In December 2007, Middleton Press took advantage of Network Rail's willingness to grant third-party publishers the right to print paper versions of the National Rail timetable. Network Rail had discontinued official hard copies in favour of PDF editions, which could be downloaded free of charge.

As a tribute to Bradshaw, Middleton Press named its timetables the Bradshaw-Mitchell's Rail Times. A competing edition reproduced from Network Rail's artwork, is published by TSO, This is a same-size reproduction of the Network Rail artwork, although the size is only about 70% in the Middleton Press versions to reduce the page count. A third publisher, UK Rail Timetables, The main timetable for Indian Railways is still known as the Newman Indian Bradshaw.

== List of Bradshaw's by geographic coverage ==
=== British Isles ===
==== Timetables ====
- Bradshaw's 1839 Timetable
- Bradshaw's monthly railway and steam navigation guide for Great Britain and Ireland, 1844:May - No. 30
- Bradshaw's monthly railway and steam navigation guide for Great Britain and Ireland, 1845:July - No. 144
- Bradshaw's monthly railway and steam navigation guide for Great Britain and Ireland, 1846:June - No. 155
- Bradshaw's monthly railway and steam navigation guide for Great Britain and Ireland, 1847:March - No. 164
- Bradshaw's general railway and steam navigation guide for Great Britain and Ireland, 1851:December - No. 221
- Bradshaw's general railway and steam navigation guide for Great Britain and Ireland, 1854:January - No. 246
- Bradshaw's general railway and steam navigation guide for Great Britain and Ireland, 1855:February - No. 259
- Bradshaw's general railway and steam navigation guide for Great Britain and Ireland, 1855:August - No. 265
- Bradshaw's general railway and steam navigation guide for Great Britain and Ireland, 1857:July - No. 288
- Bradshaw's general railway and steam navigation guide for Great Britain and Ireland, 1858:January - No. 294
- Bradshaw's general railway and steam navigation guide for Great Britain and Ireland, 1858:August - No. 301
- Bradshaw's general railway and steam navigation guide for Great Britain and Ireland, 1859:January - No. 306
- Bradshaw's general railway and steam navigation guide for Great Britain and Ireland, 1859:July - No. 312
- Bradshaw's general railway and steam navigation guide for Great Britain and Ireland, 1860:January - No. 318
- Bradshaw's general railway and steam navigation guide for Great Britain and Ireland, 1860:July - No. 324
- Bradshaw's general railway and steam navigation guide for Great Britain and Ireland, 1861:January - No. 330
- Bradshaw's general railway and steam navigation guide for Great Britain and Ireland, 1861:July - No. 336
- Bradshaw's general railway and steam navigation guide for Great Britain and Ireland, 1862:January - No. 342
- Bradshaw's general railway and steam navigation guide for Great Britain and Ireland, 1863:January - No. 354
- Bradshaw's general railway and steam navigation guide for Great Britain and Ireland, 1865:July - No. 384
- Bradshaw's general railway and steam navigation guide for Great Britain and Ireland, 1866:July - No. 396
- Bradshaw's general railway and steam navigation guide for Great Britain and Ireland, 1877:June - No. 527 - archive.org
- Bradshaw's general railway and steam guide for Great Britain and Ireland, 1887:August
- Bradshaw's general railway and steam navigation guide for Great Britain and Ireland, 1891:March - No. 692
- Bradshaw's general railway and steam navigation guide for Great Britain and Ireland, 1896:June - No. 755
- Bradshaw's general railway and steam guide for Great Britain and Ireland, 1900:May
- Bradshaw's general railway and steam guide for Great Britain and Ireland, 1910:April
- Bradshaw's Guide for Great Britain and Ireland, 1943:December - No. 1325
- Bradshaw's Guide for Great Britain and Ireland, 1944:March - No. 1328

==== Guidebooks ====
- Bradshaw's Descriptive Guide to the London & South Western Railway. London: Adams. 1845.
- Bradshaw's Descriptive Guide to the Caledonian Railway. London: Adams. 1848.
- Bradshaw's Guide through London and its Environs. London: Adams. 1857.
- Bradshaw's Handbook for Tourists in Great Britain & Ireland. London: Adams. 1858.
- Bradshaw's Descriptive Railway Hand-Book of Great Britain and Ireland. London: W.J. Adams. 1860.
  - Section 2: Berks, Buckingham, Wilts, Dorset, Devon, Cornwall, Somerset, Gloucester, the South Wales districts, Oxford, Warwick, Salop, Chester, Flint, Carnarvon, Anglesea and through Ireland
- Bradshaw's Shilling Hand-Book of Great Britain and Ireland. London: W.J. Adams. 1860.
  - Section 3: London and North Western, North Stafford, Lancashire and Yorkshire (Western section), Preston, Lancaster, and Carlisle, Ayrshire, Caledonian, and Scotch Railways + Index
- Bradshaw's Monthly Alphabetical Hand-book through London and its Environs. London: W.J. Adams. 1862.
- Bradshaw's Handbook for Tourists in Great Britain and Ireland, Section 1 - London and its Environs. 1866. + Index
- Bradshaw's Handbook for Tourists in Great Britain and Ireland, Section 2 - Tours in North and South Wales, Ireland and the lakes of Killarney. 1866.
- Bradshaw's Descriptive Railway Hand-Book of Great Britain and Ireland. 1870.
  - Section 1: Kent, Sussex, Hants, Dorset, Devon, the Channel Islands, and the Isle of Wight + Index
- Bradshaw's Illustrated Handbook for Tourists in Great Britain and Ireland. 1876.
  - Section 1: (London and southern England)
- Bradshaw's Handbook for Tourists in Great Britain and Ireland. London: W.J. Adams. 1882.
- Henry de Salis (1904). Bradshaw's Canals and Navigable Waterways of England and Wales. London: Henry Blacklock.

=== Australia ===
- Bradshaw's Guide to Victoria (Australia)
- Bradshaw's New South Wales postal & road guide. Sydney. May 1870.

=== France ===
- Morell, John Reynell (1867). Bradshaw's Handbook to the Paris International Exhibition 1867. London: W. J. Adams & Sons.
- Bradshaw's Illustrated Guide through Paris and its Environs. London: W.J. Adams and Sons. 1880. OCLC 19043482. OL 23282675M.
- Bradshaw's Illustrated Hand-book to France. London: W.J. Adams and Sons. c. 1889.
- J.W.C. Hughes (1896). Bradshaw's Hand-book to Brittany. London: W.J. Adams & Sons.
- Bradshaw's Hand-book to Normandy and the Channel Islands. London: W.J. Adams & Sons. 1896.

=== Germany, Austria and Belgium ===
- Bradshaw's Notes for Travellers in Tyrol and Vorarlberg. London: W.J. Adams & Sons. c. 1873. OL 19356483M.
- Bradshaw's Illustrated Hand-book to Germany. London: W.J. Adams & Sons. 1873. + Index
- Bradshaw's Illustrated Hand-book to Germany. London: W.J. Adams & Sons. 1876.
- Bradshaw's Illustrated Hand-book for Belgium and the Rhine; and Portions of Rhenish Germany. London: W.J. Adams & Sons. 1896. + Index
- Bradshaw's Illustrated Hand-book to Germany and Austria. London: W.J. Adams & Sons. 1896. OL 20511184M. + Index - another copy
  - 1898 ed. + index

=== India ===
- Bradshaw's Hand-Book to the Bengal Presidency, and Western Provinces of India. London: W.J. Adams. 1864.
- Bradshaw's Hand-Book to the Bombay Presidency and North-Western Provinces of India. London: W.J. Adams. 1864.
- Bradshaw's Illustrated Hand-Book to the Madras Presidency, and the Central Provinces of India. London: W.J. Adams. 1864.

=== Italy ===
- J.R. Morell, ed. (1870). Bradshaw's Pedestrian Route-book for Switzerland, Chamouni, and the Italian Lakes. London: W.J. Adams. OCLC 1659797. OL 20438782M.
- Bradshaw's Illustrated Hand-book to Italy. London: W.J. Adams & Sons. 1894. OL 20453269M. + Index

=== New Zealand ===
- Bradshaw's Guide to New Zealand. January 1880 (believed to be the only copy published).

=== Spain and Portugal ===
- Charnock, Richard Stephen (1865–1899). Bradshaw's Illustrated Hand-book to Spain and Portugal: A Complete Guide for Travellers in the Peninsula. London: W.J. Adams & Sons. (edited and reissued annually)

=== Syria and Palestine ===
- Bradshaw's Hand-Book to the Turkish Empire. Vol. 2: Syria & Palestine. London: W.J. Adams. c. 1873.

=== Turkey ===
- Bradshaw's Hand-Book to the Turkish Empire. Vol. 1: Turkey in Europe. London: W.J. Adams. c. 1872. + Index

=== International ===
- Bradshaw's Through Routes to the Capitals of the World, and Overland Guide to India, Persia, and the Far East. London: Henry Blacklock & Co. 1903.

== List of Bradshaw's by date of publication ==
=== 1830s–1840s ===
- Bradshaw's Railway Time Tables and Assistant to Railway Travelling. 1839.
- Bradshaw's Railway Companion. 1840.
- Bradshaw's Monthly Railway Guide. 1841.
- Bradshaw's Descriptive Guide to the London & South Western Railway. London: Adams. 1845.
- Bradshaw's Continental Railway Guide. 1847.
- Bradshaw's Descriptive Guide to the Caledonian Railway. London: Adams. 1848.

=== 1850s–1860s ===
- Bradshaw's Illustrated Hand-book for Travellers in Belgium. London: W.J. Adams. 1856. OL 20608510M.
- Bradshaw's Guide through London and its Environs. London: Adams. 1857.
- Bradshaw's Handbook for Tourists in Great Britain & Ireland. London: Adams. 1858.
- Bradshaw's Shilling Hand-Book of Great Britain and Ireland. 1860. hdl:2027/nyp.33433003275942.
- Bradshaw's Notes for Travellers in Tyrol and Vorarlberg. London: W.J. Adams & Sons. 1863. OL 19356483M. (PDF version). (Note: All issues from 1863 to 1899 available in PDF format from the Bodleian Library.)
- Bradshaw's Hand-Book to the Bengal Presidency, and Western Provinces of India. London: W.J. Adams. 1864.
- Bradshaw's Hand-Book to the Bombay Presidency and North-Western Provinces of India. London: W.J. Adams. 1864.
- Bradshaw's Illustrated Hand-Book to the Madras Presidency, and the Central Provinces of India. London: W.J. Adams. 1864.
- Bradshaw's Handbook for Tourists in Great Britain and Ireland. 1866. hdl:2027/mdp.39015065192919.
- Morell, John Reynell (1867). Bradshaw's Handbook to the Paris International Exhibition 1867. London: W.J. Adams & Sons.

=== 1870s–1880s ===
- Bradshaw's Descriptive Railway Hand-Book of Great Britain and Ireland. 1870. + Index
- J.R. Morell, ed. (1870). Bradshaw's Pedestrian Route-book for Switzerland, Chamouni, and the Italian Lakes. London: W.J. Adams. OCLC 1659797. OL 20438782M.
- Bradshaw's Hand-Book to the Turkish Empire. Vol. 1: Turkey in Europe. London: W.J. Adams. c. 1872.
- Bradshaw's Hand-Book to the Turkish Empire. Vol. 2: Syria & Palestine. London: W.J. Adams. c. 1873.
- Bradshaw's Illustrated Travellers' Hand-Book to France. London: W.J. Adams. c. 1873.
- Bradshaw's Illustrated Guide through Paris and its Environs. London: W.J. Adams and Sons. 1880. OCLC 19043482. OL 23282675M.
- Bradshaw's Monthly Continental Railway, Steam Transit, and General Guide, for Travellers Through Europe. London: Adams & Sons. July 1887.
- Bradshaw's Illustrated Hand-book to France. London: W.J. Adams and Sons. c. 1889.

=== 1890s–1900s ===
- Bradshaw's Illustrated Hand-book to Italy. London: W.J. Adams & Sons. 1894. OL 20453269M.
- Charnock, Richard Stephen (1894). Bradshaw's Illustrated Hand-book to Spain and Portugal: A Complete Guide for Travellers in the Peninsula. London: W.J. Adams & Sons. OL 23427514M.
- Bradshaw's Illustrated Hand-book for Belgium and the Rhine, and Portions of Rhenish Germany; with A Ten Days' Tour in Holland. London: W.J. Adams & Sons. 1896.
- Hughes, John William C. (1896). Bradshaw's Hand-book to Brittany. London: W.J. Adams & Sons. (PDF version).
- Bradshaw's Hand-book to Normandy and the Channel Islands. London: W.J. Adams & Sons. 1896.
- Bradshaw's Illustrated Hand-book to Germany and Austria. London: W.J. Adams & Sons. 1896. OL 20511184M.
- de Salis, Henry (1904). Bradshaw's Canals and Navigable Waterways of England and Wales. London: Henry Blacklock & Co.
- Bradshaw's Through Routes to the Capitals of the World, and Overland Guide to India, Persia, and the Far East. London: Henry Blacklock & Co. 1903.
- Collet, François A. (1913). Bradshaw's Complete Anglo-French Phrase-Book for Travellers and Students. London: Henry Blacklock & Co.
- Reynolds-Ball, Eustace Alfred (1913). Bradshaw's Through Routes to the Chief Cities, and Bathing, and Health Resorts of the World: A Handbook of India, Colonial, and Foreign Travel. London: Henry Blacklock & Co.

== Sources ==
- Chisholm, Hugh, ed. (1911). "Bradshaw, George" . Encyclopædia Britannica. Vol. 4 (11th ed.). Cambridge University Press. p. 373.
- This article incorporates text from a publication now in the public domain: Boase, George Clement (1886). "Bradshaw, George". In Stephen, Leslie (ed.). Dictionary of National Biography. Vol. 6. London: Smith, Elder & Co. pp. 174–175.
