= George Samuel Measom =

British engraver and publisher

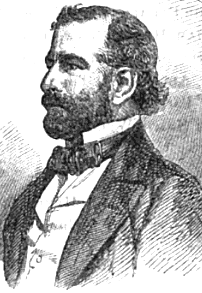
Portrait of Measom, ca.1860s

Sir George Samuel Measom (3 December 1818 – 1 March 1901) was a British engraver and publisher who compiled guides to railway travel in Great Britain in the mid-19th century. In later life he became involved in charitable works, and was knighted in 1891.

== Biography ==
Measom was born in Blackheath, Kent, the son of Daniel Measom, a carver and gilder.

In 1842, he married Sarah Hillman. During the 1840s, he developed his skills as an engraver and in 1849 published The Bible: its Elevating Influence on Man, a moral tale in illustrated form. From the 1850s onwards much of Measom's work related to descriptions of railways; his first railway work was the 1852 Illustrated Guide to the Great Western Railway. His railway works described the railways from the practical standpoint of a traveller, and all publications after the first took a title of the form The Official Illustrated Guide to ... . By 1867 his books covered the entire British network.

Sarah died in 1867, after which he remarried to Charlotte Simpson.

From the 1880s, Measom became involved in charity work. He was treasurer of the Royal Society for the Prevention of Cruelty to Animals, and promoted a related effort that later became the Battersea Dogs' Home, and supported the Royal Marsden hospital.

He was knighted in 1891, for his public work. George Measom died on 1 March 1901 at home, Isleworth, Middlesex. He left no children.

== Works ==
- The Bible: its Elevating Influence on Man, 1849
- Illustrated Guide to the Great Western Railway, 1852
- Official Illustrated Guide to the Brighton and South Coast Railways, London: H.G. Collins, 1853
- Official Illustrated Guide to the South-Eastern Railway, London: W.H. Smith and Son, 1853, OCLC 25963337
- The Crystal Palace Alphabet: A Guide for Good Children, 1855
- Light from the East: Tales Moral and Instructive of Oriental Origin and Character, 1856
- Official Illustrated Guide to the Great Northern Railway, London: W.H. Smith and Son, 1857
- Official Illustrated Guide to the Lancaster and Carlisle, Edinburgh & Glasgow, and Caledonian Railways, London: W.H. Smith and Son, 1859
- Official Illustrated Guide to the North-Western Railway, London: W.H. Smith and Son, 1859
- Official Illustrated Guide to the Bristol and Exeter, North and South Devon, Cornwall, and South Wales Railways, London: Richard Griffin and Co., 1860
- Official Illustrated Guide to the Great Northern Railway, London: Griffin, Bohn, 1861, OCLC 12433505, OL 20523968M
- Official Illustrated Guide to the Great Eastern Railway, London: C. Griffin and Co., 1865
- Official Illustrated Guide to the Great Southern & Western Railway, London: C. Griffin, 1866
- Official illustrated guide to the Midland Great Western, and Dublin and Drogheda Railways, London: C. Griffin and Co., 1867

== See also ==
- George Bradshaw, publisher of railway timetables and guides.
