= Portrait of George Bradshaw =

Painting by Richard Evans

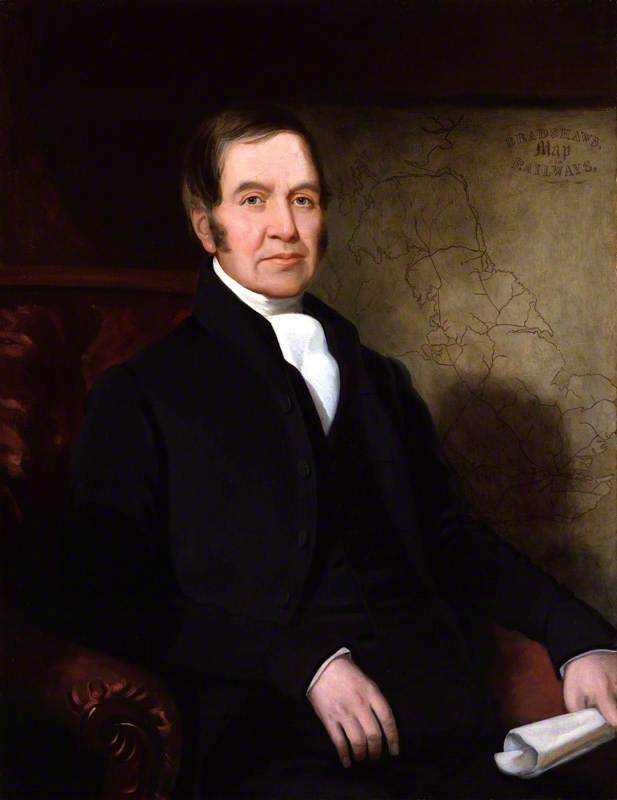
- Artist: Richard Evans
- Year: 1841
- Type: Oil on canvas, portrait
- Dimensions: 91.4 cm × 71.1 cm (36.0 in × 28.0 in)
- Location: National Portrait Gallery; London

Portrait of George Bradshaw is an 1841 portrait painting by the British artist Richard Evans of the English cartographer and publisher George Bradshaw. Bradshaw is best known for publishing Bradshaw's Guide which featured timetables, maps and travel guides for Britain's railway network which was rapidly expanding during the Industrial Revolution.

Evans was a noted portraitist who had apprenticed under and assisted Thomas Lawrence, the most prominent portrait painter of the Regency era. Next to Bradshaw is one of his maps featuring the railway network of Great Britain. It is the only known portrait of him. Today it is in the collection of the National Portrait Gallery in London having been bequeathed by the sitter's son in 1928.

== Bibliography ==
- Clammer, Paul. Black Crown: Henry Christophe, the Haitian Revolution and the Caribbean's Forgotten Kingdom. Hurst Publishers, 2023.
- Johnston, Elizabeth. Art and the Industrial Revolution. Manchester City Art Gallery, 1968.
- Smith, Graham Royde. The History of Bradshaw: Centenary Review of the Origin and Growth of the Most Famous Guide in the World. H. Blacklock, 1939.
