= Deborah Greaves =

British engineer

- Education: University of Bristol (BEng); St Edmund Hall, Oxford (DPhil)
- Awards: OBE (2018); FREng (2020)
- Scientific career
- Workplaces: University College London; University of Bath; University of Plymouth
- Thesis: Numerical modelling of laminar separated flows and inviscid steep waves using adaptive hierarchical meshes (1995)

Deborah Mary Greaves (born March 1967) is a British engineer, Professor of Ocean Engineering and Head of the School of Engineering, Computing and Mathematics at the University of Plymouth. In 2020 she was elected a Fellow of the Royal Academy of Engineering.

== Early life and education ==
Greaves studied civil engineering at the University of Bristol. She earned her bachelor's degree in 1988 and started work as a civil engineer. In 1992 Greaves returned to academia, and moved to St Edmund Hall, Oxford for her doctoral studies. Her doctoral research considered the numerical modelling of fluid flows, and she graduated in 1998.

== Career ==
After earning her doctoral degree Greaves joined University College London as a lecturer in mechanical engineering. In 2002 Greaves joined the University of Bath as a lecturer in architecture and civil engineering. She was awarded a Royal Society University Research Fellowship. Here she investigated the impact of wind on fabric in an effort to design new materials to cover large open spaces.

In 2008 Greaves moved to the University of Plymouth. Greaves studies offshore renewable energy as well as creating numerical models of wave-structure interactions. At the University of Plymouth she serves as Head of School of Engineering, Computing and Mathematics. Here she led the €2 million European Commission project Streamlining of Ocean Wave Farm Impacts Assessment (SOWFIA), which looked at the development of wave farms in European countries. SOWFIA considered several Wave Energy Converters in an attempt to improve expertise of large scale energy projects. An outcome of SOWFIA was a catalogue of wave energy test sites, as well as several workshops and reports on the environmental risks and benefits associated with the use of wave energy. She leads the Collaborative Computational Project in Wave Structure Interaction (CCP-WSI), a project which develops wave tank codes for tackling challenges that arise from complex wave-structure interactions.

Greaves is director of the Sustainable PowER GENeration and supply (Supergen) Offshore Renewable Energy (ORE) Hub, which researches several renewable energy technologies. Supergen ORE is a £9 million Engineering and Physical Sciences Research Council project that looks at future challenges for renewable energy sources and looks at how the offshore energy distribution system will need to be transformed in the future. She had developed the University of Plymouth Coastal, Ocean and Sediment Transport (COAST) laboratory which looks at marine energy devices and environmental impact modelling.

=== Academic service ===
Greaves is the chair of the board of the Partnership for Research In Marine Renewable Energy (PRIMaRE) and Directs the Supergen ORE Hub. She serves on the Carbon Trust Advisory Board She is a Fellow of the Women's Engineering Society and the Institution of Civil Engineers as well as serving as an expert advisor for the United Nations. She was shortlisted for the WISE Campaign Research Award in 2014. In 2018 Greaves was awarded an Order of the British Empire in the Queen's Birthday Honours in recognition of her services to marine engineering, equality and higher education.

== Selected publications ==
- Greaves, Deborah (2018). Wave and Tidal Energy. John Wiley & Sons. ISBN 9781119014454.
- Greaves, Deborah (2012). "Air–water two-phase flow modelling of hydrodynamic performance of an oscillating water column device". Renewable Energy. 41: 159–170. doi:10.1016/j.renene.2011.10.011.
- Greaves, Deborah (1999). "Hierarchical tree‐based finite element mesh generation". International Journal for Numerical Methods in Engineering. 45 (4): 447–471. Bibcode:1999IJNME..45..447G. doi:10.1002/(SICI)1097-0207(19990610)45:4<447::AID-NME592>3.0.CO;2-#.
- Greaves, Deborah (2005). "Simulation of viscous water column collapse using adapting hierarchical grids". International Journal for Numerical Methods in Fluids. 50 (6): 693–711. doi:10.1002/fld.1073. S2CID 124488159.

Greaves is on the editorial board of Engineering and Computational Mechanics and the International Journal for Marine Energy.
