= Forvie =

Abandoned medieval village in Aberdeenshire, Scotland

Coordinates: 57.32833°N 1.97187°W

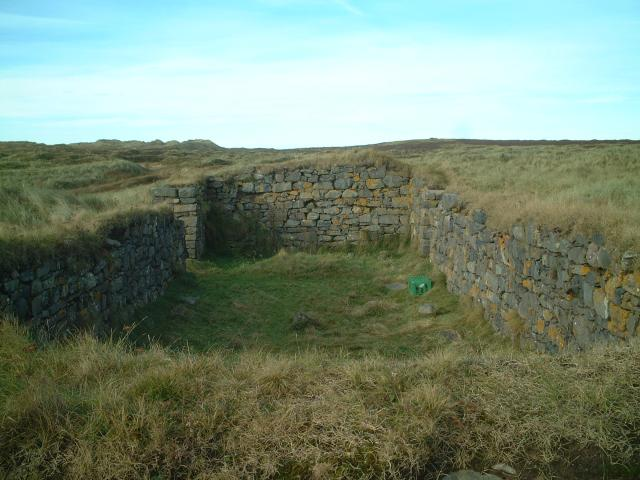
Forvie Church Remains. Forvie Parish Church and the whole village were overwhelmed by a great sandstorm in the 14th century.

Forvie was a village in what is now the Forvie National Nature Reserve, about fourteen miles north of Aberdeen, near the modern location of Rockend. It was one of several settlements in northeast Scotland that were abandoned after being overwhelmed by shifting dunes.

There are visible remains of the 12th-century church of St Adamnan, and other remains were discovered by a survey in the 1950s. Little is known of the village, which is believed to have been abandoned during the 15th century. Interpretive material at the site suggests that oats provided good harvests.
