= Bradshaw's Guide to Victoria =

The British Bradshaw's Guide was an early compiled timetable, including all known public railways in Great Britain. The Wikipedia Bradshaw's Guide page also lists a number of other countries that issued compiled timetables, borrowing the Bradshaw name from the British model: France, Germany and Austria, India, Italy, Australia, New Zealand, Syria and Turkey. In Australia two Bradshaw's were issued: the short-lived Bradshaw's New South Wales postal & road guide which was published for a short time in the late 1860s and 1870s; and Bradshaw's Guide to Victoria, which had an 86-year life, from 1856 to 1942. (The January 1880 edition of Bradshaw's Guide to New Zealand is believed to be the only such copy.)

== Background ==
Bradshaw's Railway and General Guide to Victoria was first published in May 1856. It appropriated the name of the famed British Bradshaw's Railway Guide. It was first published less than two years after the opening of Victoria's (and Australia's) first railway from Melbourne to Sandridge, but a number of other railways were in the course of construction, and the timetables were included as soon as the particular line opened. Nevertheless, the early editions of Bradshaw's contained numerous coach timetables and other miscellaneous material.

July 1859 is an example of an early issue; a time when Melbourne's railways were at an embryonic stage. The privately owned Melbourne and Hobson's Bay Railway Company, the Melbourne and Suburban Railway Company, and the Geelong and Melbourne Railway Company were all operating, and the government-owned Victorian Railways had just built their first lines to Williamstown and Sunbury. Railway information only occupied eight of the 124 pages. The remainder of the Guide provided comprehensive detail of all manner of institutions in what was a very fast-growing colony, mainly because of the Victorian gold rush. Information is given about the Parliament, Government, courts, municipal councils, the electric telegraph, banks, insurance companies, churches, Masonic lodges, postal charges and arrangements, and country localities. There were also a number of advertisements. The printing is of a high standard for the times.

The Victorian Bradshaw was published monthly and was available from newsagents throughout the state. In latter years, the railway timetable section was based on information supplied by Victorian Railways but sometimes the information was a little behind that in the V.R.s own public timetables, usually published twice-yearly, and available from train stations across the state. However, as we've already seen, Bradshaw's provided much more than railway timetables. The November 1936 edition also contained: cab fares; calendars; information on cities, towns, boroughs, shires, including population; a comprehensive Commonwealth of Australia section; list of consuls; directions for making a will; fish, minimum lengths of; gardening notes; a comprehensive Government of Victoria section; a post office and telegraph section, including rates; railway cloak room rates, fares, parcels rates, etc.; stamp duties; standard time; tides at Williamstown; a comprehensive tramway section covering government and private tramways, cable and electric; voter's qualifications.

By 1890 the layout of Bradshaw's Guide to Victoria was basically as it was in 1936 (see above) and it retained a similar layout until it ceased publication in 1942. By 1890 about 70% of Bradshaw was railway timetables, about 25% Postal arrangements, and the balance a miscellaneous collection of sometimes odd information about Victoria (as listed above).

When Bradshaw's Guide to Victoria commenced publication, its railway section was a compiled timetable covering the services of all Victorian railways, public and privately owned. In that respect it was similar to other Bradshaw's Guide around the world. However, within a few decades, the Victorian Railways had taken over the vast majority of railways in the state, and by the 1920s the shire-owned Kerang-Koondrook Tramway was the only privately owned railway in Victoria. Its timetable was published by Bradshaw, and although it wasn't a V.R. line, its services were also shown in V.R. timetables.

Until December 1896 Bradshaw's was published by Wilson, Mackinnon and Fairfax. Much of the artwork was provided by engraver Fredrick Grosse. From January 1897 and until the last edition, the publishing and printing of Bradshaw's was in the hands of Mr Bill Stillwell who, at various stages operated as Stillwell & Knight, Stillwell & Stephens. Stillwell & Co.

As the Victorian Railways grew, the size of Bradshaw's did not increase. Rather, information other than that for the railways and postal services was dropped. The other striking characteristic of Bradshaw's Guide to Victoria over the years was that the quality of the printing and layout did not improve – it deteriorated. By the late nineteenth century, Bradshaw's had a poor appearance.

Unlike V.R. timetables which showed the various tables in geographical order, Bradshaw's was geographically erratic. Smaller tables were placed under larger ones where there was an appropriate space and there was no attempt at any order. Generally, mainlines appeared at the beginning, but then logic disappears. Branch lines appeared in random order, with no regard to geography. Country and suburban tables are mixed up. Sometimes the printing went right up to the edge of the page, and sometimes even a small portion of a table was missing.

== Closure ==
Bradshaw's Guide to Victoria ceased publication in August 1942.

In latter years the V.R. appeared to perceive Bradshaw's as competition to their own public timetables and were therefore reluctant to hand over timetable changes to Bradshaw's, and when they did it was usually after the same information had appeared in their own publications. This is strongly believed to be one reason for Stillwell & Co stopping production. However, the major reason for ceasing publication in August 1942 was that there were major restrictions on rail travel due to World War II.

In its final years, 1940–1942, the overwhelming impression is of a poor, cheaply produced publication. One of the first items in these editions is a list of consuls accredited in Victoria. This still listed the consuls for Germany, Japan, Austria, Czechoslovakia and other countries with which Australia had either been at war for a number of years or whose country had disappeared even earlier in the lead-up to war. Indeed, the impression is that the publishers really didn't care any more. The arrangement of the timetables is even more higgledy-piggledy than before; they are in no particular order as to geography and country and suburban tables are still mixed up together. Some suburban lines have services on different days appearing in different parts of the book. Some railway timetables are placed, for no apparent reason, well away from the rest of the railway section; after the postal information.

Nevertheless, a study of the railway timetables over these last three years shows that attempts were made to keep these tables up-to-date. The timetables show, in general, a decline in the standard of VR passenger service as war priorities took hold.

In 1940 the tramway summary timetables still reflected the separate pre-1920 suburban Tramway Trusts. However, between 1940 and 1941, the publisher did take the trouble to redesign the tramway summary timetables. On the other hand, between 1941 and 1942, the railway country and metropolitan foldout maps disappeared; this was presumably either a cost-saving measure, or a result of World War II and a subsequent desire not to provide Australia's enemies with maps.

The non-railway and non-postal information that survived to this period was a very odd mixture: lists of Federal and State Members of Parliament, consuls in Victoria, gardening notes (presumably recycled each year), and Victorian game hunting laws.

The final Bradshaw's Guide to Victoria was published in August 1942. There was a large print run of the last edition, and it was available from many newsagents for some years after it was published. In December 1941, the Victorian Railways had published their last public timetable, primarily because of staff shortages caused by World War II but also continuing into the post-war period. There was not another VR timetable until 1954. Therefore, the last edition of Bradshaw's, albeit out of date, was the only thing that the public had to refer to. Within nine months Victoria went from having two regular Railway public timetables to none.

Despite its disreputable and off-putting appearance Bradshaw's Guide to Victoria is a valuable source of historical timetable information. The railway information was usually kept up-to-date, even when the rest of the information was not. However, for the best information, it is of course preferable to go the official Victorian Railways timetables, but Bradshaw's is still useful: firstly, its more frequent publication gave greater topicality; and secondly, it is more widely available in reference libraries than VR timetables.

== See also ==
- Bradshaw's Guide, similar British guide
- Bradshaw's Railway Guide, similar British guide
- Public transport timetable,
- Railways in Victoria.
