= Great Asian Railway Journeys =

2020 British travel documentary TV series

- Genre: Travel documentary
- Directed by: Dave Minchin
- Presented by: Michael Portillo
- Composers: Jon Wygens, Joe Donohoe
- Country of origin: United Kingdom
- Original language: English
- No. of seasons: 1
- No. of episodes: 20 (short versions); 10 (long versions)

Production
- Executive producer: John Comerford
- Production locations: Hong Kong, Thailand, Vietnam, Indonesia, Malaysia, Singapore
- Editor: Alison Kreps
- Running time: 30 minutes (short versions); 60 minutes (long versions)
- Production company: Boundless

Original release
- Network: BBC Two
- Release: 27 January 2020

Related
- Great British Railway Journeys; Great Continental Railway Journeys; Railways of the Great War with Michael Portillo; Great American Railroad Journeys; Great Indian Railway Journeys; Great Alaskan Railroad Journeys; Great Canadian Railway Journeys; Great Australian Railway Journeys

Great Asian Railway Journeys is a 20-part BBC travel and history documentary series produced by Boundless and presented by Michael Portillo, a former Conservative MP and Minister of State for Transport. Following the format of the highly successful Great British Railway Journeys and related series with Portillo as presenter, each episode features a railway journey in south-east Asia using Bradshaw's Through Routes to the Chief Cities, and Bathing, and Health Resorts of the World (1913) as a historical reference, in order to consider how the places visited have changed over the preceding century.

During the course of the series, Portillo travels a total distance of 2,500 miles and passes through six countries, beginning with Hong Kong then moving on to Thailand, Vietnam, Indonesia and Malaysia before reaching his final destination of Singapore. One of the main themes he explores is colonial history, examining the legacy of the British, French, Dutch and Portuguese empires, and how the countries involved gained their independence. Filming for the series was carried out in two stages and took 7–8 weeks to complete.

== Broadcast ==
The programme was first broadcast as 20 30-minute episodes on consecutive weekday evenings on BBC Two, beginning on 27 January 2020. It was re-broadcast weekly as ten 60-minute episodes starting 4 April 2020.

== Episodes ==
No.	Title	Original release date
Short versions
1	"Kowloon to Wan Chai"	27 January 2020
2	"Hong Kong University to Lantau Island"	28 January 2020
3	"Chiang Mai to Lampang"	29 January 2020
4	"Ayutthaya to River Kwai"	30 January 2020
5	"Bangkok"	31 January 2020
6	"Bangkok to Hua Hin"	3 February 2020
7	"Ho Chi Minh City to Phan Thiet"	4 February 2020
8	"Da Nang to Hoi An"	5 February 2020
9	"Huế to Ninh Bình"	6 February 2020
10	"Hanoi to Ha Long Bay"	7 February 2020
11	"Jakarta to Bogor"	10 February 2020
12	"Jakarta to Borobudur/Kutoarjo"	11 February 2020
13	"Yogyakarta to Ambarawa"	12 February 2020
14	"Ambarawa to Surabaya"	13 February 2020
15	"Penang to Kuala Kangsar"	14 February 2020
16	"Kuala Kangsar to Cameron Highlands"	17 February 2020
17	"Kuala Lumpur to Melaka"	18 February 2020
18	"Melaka to Johor Bahru"	19 February 2020
19	"Raffles Place to Botanic Gardens"	20 February 2020
20	"Chinatown to Gardens by the Bay"	21 February 2020
Long versions
1	"Hong Kong"	4 April 2020
2	"Chiang Mai to the River Kwai"	11 April 2020
3	"Bangkok to Hua Hin"	18 April 2020
4	"Ho Chi Minh to Hoi An"	25 April 2020
5	"Hue to Halong Bay"	2 May 2020
6	"Jakarta to Borobudur"	9 May 2020
7	"Yogyakarta to Surabaya"	16 May 2020
8	"Penang to Cameron Highlands"	23 May 2020
9	"Kuala Lumpur to Johor Bahru"	30 May 2020
10	"Singapore"	6 June 2020

== See also ==
- Colonialism
- Imperialism
- Rail Transport in Hong Kong
- Rail Transport in Indonesia
- Rail Transport in Malaysia
- Rail Transport in Singapore
- Rail Transport in Thailand
- Rail Transport in Vietnam
