= Great American Railroad Journeys =

- Genre: Travel documentary
- Presented by: Michael Portillo
- Composer: Jon Wygens
- Country of origin: United Kingdom
- Original language: English
- No. of series: 4
- No. of episodes: 55 (Series 1–3)

Production
- Executive producer: John Comerford
- Producer: Alison Kreps
- Running time: 30 minutes
- Production company: Boundless

Original release
- Network: BBC Two; BBC Two HD
- Release: 1 February 2016 – 28 March 2020

Related
- Great British Railway Journeys; Great Continental Railway Journeys; Railways of the Great War with Michael Portillo (2014); Great Indian Railway Journeys; Great Alaskan Railroad Journeys; Great Canadian Railway Journeys; Great Australian Railway Journeys; Great Asian Railway Journeys

Great American Railroad Journeys is a BBC travel documentary series presented by Michael Portillo and broadcast on BBC Two. Using an 1879 copy of Appleton's Guidebook to the railroads of the United States and Canada, Portillo travels across the United States and Canada primarily by train, though at times using other forms of transportation where necessary. On his journeys, he makes stops to learn how places, events and people, and the railroads of the 19th century influenced the country's growth into a major superpower.

When originally broadcast, each series consisted of 30-minute episodes, shown on consecutive weekday evenings. As of 28 March 2020, 4 series of the programme have been broadcast since its debut on 1 February 2016.

== Episodes ==
=== Series 1 (2016) (Note: Episode Numbers conform to the Original Broadcast in 2016, from 1 February to 19 February) ===
In his first series, Portillo took two railroad journeys in the north-east of the United States, spanning a total of 15 episodes. His first journey took him across the US State of New York, travelling around New York City and Long Island before heading to Niagara Falls via New York's state capital of Albany and Buffalo. His second journey took him across the Mid-Atlantic States of Pennsylvania, Delaware, Maryland and Virginia, travelling from Philadelphia to Jamestown, via Washington, D.C.

Series 1 was repeated in July/August 2016 in a revised schedule (described as "Reversions") with two of the original 30-minute episodes merged, plus scenes not previously shown, to create a series of eight 60-minute episodes; as series 1 consisted of fifteen 30-minute episodes, the "Brooklyn to Montauk" episode was revised as an extended version that included additional content not seen in the original broadcast schedule. The Series 1 DVD contains only the original fifteen episodes.

==== New York City to Niagara Falls ====
No.	Title	Original release date	Prod. code	UK viewers (millions)
1	"Manhattan: Grand Central to Broadway"	1 February 2016	1.01	1.97
Portillo's first railroad journey begins with an exploration of the Manhattan borough of New York City. Places visited (via subway), include Grand Central, the Rockefeller Center, the Financial District, Central Park, the Metropolitan Museum of Art, and Broadway. Portillo finds out about the American industrialists of the Gilded Age, learns of the origins of New York's skyscrapers, uncovers how Grand Central operates, and views the art pieces contributed by the "Robber Barons" of the Gilded Age.
2	"Manhattan: Lower East Side to World Trade Center"	2 February 2016	1.02	1.84
Portillo continues his exploration of Manhattan. Places visited include the Lower East Side, the former High Line, Ellis Island (via ferry), and the new World Trade Center. He discovers how the High Line preserves its railroad history in its new function as a park, looks inside a tenement building used by 18th century immigrants and how their living conditions were eventually improved, learns how many immigrants came through Ellis Island in a day, takes instructions on making his first whiskey cocktail, and witnesses the insides of the future World Trade Center Transportation Hub and the impact 9/11 had on its construction (at time of filming).
3	"Brooklyn to Montauk"	3 February 2016	1.03	1.76
Portillo now moves out onto Long Island. Places visited include New York's boroughs of Brooklyn and Queens, the "Gold Coast" - Oheka Castle, The Hamptons - East Hampton, and Montauk - Montauk Point Light. He listens to the story about the construction of the Brooklyn Bridge and the benefits it brought, discovers what the East Side Access project aims to achieve and its progress, learns what made the "Gold Coast" attractive to New York City's wealthy in the 19th and early 20th centuries, hears how the Lady's Village Improvement Society preserve East Hampton, and finds out how important Montauk's lighthouse was to immigrants and how close it had come to being the gateway for new arrivals to America.
4	"New York City to Garrison"	4 February 2016	1.04	1.72
Portillo heads out of the city and into the region surrounding the Hudson River. Places visited include Penn Station, New York, Tarrytown, Garrison, and West Point (via ferry). He hears about Washington Irving, Robert Leroy Parker (Butch Cassidy) and Harry Alonzo Longabaugh (The Sundance Kid), and Benedict Arnold, interviews members of the Modern Police of Amtrak, visits Sleepy Hollow, sees a relic of the War of Independence, and hears more about the American Civil War and its impact on students of West Point at the time.
5	"Poughkeepsie to Albany"	5 February 2016	1.05	1.82
Portillo heads north for the state's capitol in Albany. Places visited include Poughkeepsie - Vassar College, the Poughkeepsie-Highland Railroad Bridge, the Catskill Mountains, the Hudson River School, and Albany. He learns more about Maria Mitchell and Thomas Cole, meets with New York Senator (at the time of filming) Neil Breslin, discovers more about Vassar College's origins and history, walks across the former Poughkeepsie-Highland Railroad Bridge in its new role as the longest footbridge in the world, learns why tourists and artists admire the landscape of the Catskill Mountains by viewing it from the Catskill Mountain Railroad and a zip line, and hears about Albany's brewing history as well as tasting one of its ales.
6	"Schenectady to Rochester"	8 February 2016	1.06	1.70
Portillo turns westwards, through the region that fuelled America's Industrial growth. Places visited include Schenectady, Utica - Erie Canal, Chittenango, Palmyra, and Rochester. He learns more about Thomas Edison, George Eastman and Joseph Smith, sees how L. Frank Baum is celebrated at his birthplace through the influence of his works, hears of the impact that the Erie Canal had when completed, experiences some of General Electric's modern railroad technology, investigates the history of the Mormon religion, and visits the oldest photography museum at Eastman's mansion.
7	"Buffalo to Niagara Falls"	9 February 2016	1.07	1.75
The final leg of Portillo's New York railroad journey takes him to one of the country's most spectacular features. Places visited include Buffalo and the Niagara Falls. He learns how Buffalo's position in the grain trade was improved by the railroads and the invention of Joseph Dart, lunches on the city's signature dish created by Teressa Bellissimo, hears how Colonel Ward's pumping station was built and views some of its pumps, and views one of the world's natural wonders that attracts more tourists than any of the country's national parks, seeing the Niagara Falls both up close and from a bird's-eye-view.

==== Philadelphia to Jamestown ====
No.	Title	Original release date	Prod. code	UK viewers (millions)
8	"Philadelphia to Atlantic City"	10 February 2016	1.08	1.85
Portillo's second railroad journey, through the southern half of the Mid-Atlantic states, begins in Pennsylvania and the city from which America Independence was proclaimed - Philadelphia. Places visited include Philadelphia City Hall, Southern Philadelphia, the University of Pennsylvania, the Eastern State Penitentiary (via subway), and Atlantic City. Portillo learns more about William Penn, experiences American football, tastes Philadelphia's signature dish, discovers how Atlantic City became a tourist hot spot, finds out about a prison reform created in 19th century Pennsylvania, and visits Independence Hall and the Liberty Bell.
9	"Lancaster to Gettysburg"	11 February 2016	1.09	1.78
Portillo now traverses a rich agricultural region, famous for an important battle in the American Civil War and from where America's historically most important political speech was made. He visits Lancaster, Strasburg, and Gettysburg (via Harrisburg). He learns about the Amish lifestyle, finds out how large an impact Abraham Lincoln's Gettysburg Address had upon Americans, rides on the Strasburg Rail Road and learns of its history, and views the site of the famous Battle of Gettysburg, while investigating how different attitudes to slavery triggered the American Civil War.
10	"Wilmington to Havre de Grace"	12 February 2016	1.10	1.62
Portillo now travels between the states of Delaware and Maryland, across the Mason–Dixon line. Visits include Wilmington - the Wilmington & Western Railroad, Newark, the University of Delaware, and Havre de Grace (via Aberdeen). He learns more about Éleuthère Irénée du Pont and John Smith, discovers how an early 20th century railroad innovation was demonstrated, investigates the origins and significance of the Mason-Dixon line, hears about the founding and history of the DuPont company including its involvement with gunpowder, and explores the region around the Susquehanna River that was seen by the first English settlers.
11	"Baltimore to Fort McHenry"	15 February 2016	1.11	1.72
Portillo explores the birthplace of America's railroads, the city of Baltimore. Visits include the Baltimore and Ohio Railroad Museum, the Johns Hopkins Hospital, Lexington Market, East Baltimore and Fort McHenry. He learns more about Johns Hopkins, hears about the origins of America's first railroad, views Peter Cooper's Tom Thumb, cooks up a Maryland crab cake, looks for a connection between the conditions of Baltimore's black community and slavery in the city's Civil War era, sees how philanthropy developed a hospital that became a global leader in healthcare, and finds out how heroism against the British was the origin for the nation's national anthem.
12	"Washington DC"	16 February 2016	1.12	1.65
Portillo's journey brings him to the capital of the United States - a city of political power, public architecture, and monuments and memorials. Places visited include Freedom Plaza, the Library of Congress, the Bureau of Engraving and Printing, Washington Post, the Washington Monument and Lincoln Memorial, and Ford's Theatre. He learns more about Abraham Lincoln, sees inside the printworks that creates the nation's currency, hears the story surrounding the capital's origins following America's independence, finds out how Richard Nixon was brought down by the persistence of Carl Bernstein and Bob Woodward, and visits the site where John Wilkes Booth assassinated Lincoln.
13	"Georgetown to Mount Vernon"	17 February 2016	1.13	1.62
Portillo concludes his exploration of the nation's capital, then heads south into Virginia. Visits include U Street, Georgetown - United States Naval Observatory, Alexandria and Mount Vernon (via foot travel). He learns more about George Washington, listens to a jazz performance, visits the Contrabands and Freedmen Cemetery, takes part in an archaeological dig into the United States' early years, finds out how North America's time zones were devised by railroad companies, and hears how life was for African Americans from their slave days to the American period of segregation.
14	"Manassas to Richmond"	18 February 2016	1.14	1.55
Portillo now heads for the state capital of Virginia, through a region heavily influenced by the American Civil War. Places visited include Manassas, Fredericksburg and Richmond. He learns more about Virginia's history in America's beginnings and its Civil War, hears how great were the battles fought in Manassas during the Civil War, discovers more about bourbon corn whiskey and the process to make it, and attends a cotillion ball to find out how it shaped good manners in wealthy society.
15	"Petersburg to Jamestown"	19 February 2016	1.15	1.66
The final leg of Portillo's southern Mid-Atlantic railroad journey takes him into the lands that were first colonised by English settlers. Places visited include Petersburg, Norfolk, Williamsburg - Colonial Williamsburg, and Jamestown. He visits the USS Wisconsin, experiences life as a colonial settler, hears about the Underground Railroad and Gospel Choirs, finds out about naval conflicts in the Civil War including the first naval battle between iron-clad ships, and explores the site of the first permanent English settlement in the New World and its history.

=== Series 2 (2017) (Note: Episode Numbers conform to the Original Broadcast in 2017, from 23 January to 17 February) ===
In his second series, Portillo took two railroad journeys around the midwestern and central regions of the United States, spanning a total of 20 episodes. His first recreated the experience that would have been felt by those travelling across the 19th century American Frontier, beginning in St. Louis, Missouri and travelling towards Kansas City, Dodge City, Colorado Springs, Albuquerque, and finishing at the Grand Canyon. His second focused on discovering how the modern Midwest was made, beginning in the Twin Cities and following the Mississippi River, before heading towards Chicago, and then turning back southwards towards Carbondale, eventually rejoining the Mississippi at the finishing point at Memphis.

Series 2 was repeated in April 2017 in a revised schedule (described as "Reversions") with two of the original 30-minute episodes merged, plus scenes not previously shown, to produce a series of ten 60-minute episodes.

==== St. Louis, Missouri to the Grand Canyon ====
No.	Title	Original release date	Prod. code	UK viewers (millions)
1	"St. Louis, Missouri"	23 January 2017	2.01	1.51
The first leg of Portillo's third railroad journey begins with an exploration of St. Louis via the Metrolink. Places visited include Eads Bridge, the Gateway Arch, Union Station and Shaw's Garden. Portillo takes a look inside the tallest standing monument in the country, boards a replica of the vessel used in a historic expedition that opened up new lands but brought about the demise of the Native Americans, discovered how James Buchanan Eads managed to span the Mississippi River with a bridge despite not having any experience at bridge-building, and samples refreshments in the city's former grand railroad station.
2	"St. Louis to Jefferson City, Missouri"	24 January 2017	2.02	1.55
The second leg of Portillo's Frontier railroad journey travels westwards across the state of Missouri towards its capital at Jefferson City, learning how traditions of European settlers and the introduction of law enforcement affected the region. Places visited include Washington, Hermann and Jefferson City. He samples some of the German traditions still maintained in Hermann by the descendants of the original German settlers and discovers how anti-German sentiment during World War I caused a decline in the winemaking they brought over, finds out more about George Caleb Bingham and his paintings of the west, learns how to fashion a corncob pipe at the Missouri Meerschaum company in the style employed by Henry Tibbe, and visits the jail that was used to house criminals brought in from the Wild West and the conditions it had during its early years.
3	"Sedalia to Kansas City, Missouri"	25 January 2017	2.03	1.58
The third leg of Portillo's Frontier railroad journey continues westwards across the state of Missouri towards Kansas City, learning of the culture and hidden delights developed in the 19th century and the dangers faced by early Frontier pioneers. Places visited include Sedalia, Independence, and Kansas City. He uncovers why Sedalia was the railroad town of hidden, shady pleasures for 19th century railroad workers and passengers, finds out why some freight trains in America can be over a mile long in length, discovers more about the music of Ragtime and one of its most prominent composers, Scott Joplin, experiences life in 1855 within a living museum history town, and learn about the dangers and brutal hardships that were faced by early pioneers heading out west.
4	"Kansas City to St. Joseph, Missouri"	26 January 2017	2.04	1.40
The fourth leg of Portillo's Frontier railroad journey sees him exploring the region around Kansas City. Places visited include Paola, Kansas, Kansas City - West Bottom district, and St. Joseph. He discovers how Kansas City's geographical position contributed to it being a major part of the cattle industry and how the Irish helped to shape the city into an important railroad hub for the United States, visits the first Irish business to be opened in the country and still owned and run by the family of the founder, tries out being an auctioneer at a cattle auction, learns more about the founding of the legendary Pony Express and how it was run, and listens to the story of how Jesse James came to his end.
5	"Lawrence to Topeka, Kansas"	27 January 2017	2.05	1.31
The fifth leg of Portillo's Frontier railroad journey sees him entering Kansas to explore a state of prairies and tornadoes. Places visited include Lawrence - Haskell Indian Nations University and the University of Kansas, the Midland Railway, and Topeka. He learns how Native Americans were treated in the 19th Century at Haskell, meets with the country's first storm chaser, discovers how Dr. James Naismith invented basketball before having a go at the sport inside the Allen Fieldhouse stadium, finds out what happened when the people fought back against the wealthy, privately owned railroads, and explores the Tallgrass prairie to see the importance of its ecosystem, along with how the landscape and the railroads influenced the poetry of Walt Whitman.
6	"Dodge City to Lamar, Colorado"	30 January 2017	2.06	1.55
The sixth leg of Portillo's Frontier railroad journey sees him journeying from Kansas into Colorado, across a region well known as "cowboy country". Places visited include Dodge City, and Lamar. He learns more about Wyatt Earp and Chalkley Beeson, visits a reconstruction of the Long Branch Saloon to experience a shootout during the times of lawlessness in the Wild West, finds out about the demise of the buffalo and the efforts to preserve a rare breed, listens to the music of the Dodge City Cowboy Band, samples Kansas bread and hears how the railroads helped to bring in the settlers that would make it a staple of the State's diet, and travels to the site of the Sand Creek Massacre to hear of how it resulted in the deaths of many Native Americans at the hands of the United States Army.
7	"La Junta, Colorado to Pueblo, New Mexico"	31 January 2017	2.07	1.56
The seventh leg of Portillo's Frontier railroad journey brings him towards the Rockies and to a region where expansion was earned through war. Places visited include La Junta – Bent's Old Fort, Las Animas County, Colorado (via car), Raton, New Mexico, and Pueblo, Colorado. He learns more about the Mexican–American War of 1846-48 and the result of the conflict, experiences life as a cowboy including how to use a lasso, finds out the history of firearms in the Wild West at shooting range of the NRA and of the gun culture of the United States, and visits a steel mill that helped with the expansion of the railroads into the West and continues to produce rails for the country.
8	"Cañon City, Colorado to Colorado Springs"	1 February 2017	2.08	1.64
The eighth leg of Portillo's Frontier railroad journey continues onwards into the Rockies, to a region that was opened up to settlement and trade. Places visited include Cañon City - Royal Gorge Route Railroad, Colorado Springs (via car), and Pike's Peak - Pike's Peak Cog Railway. He travels on the Royal Gorge and learns how its construction was dogged by a war with a rival railroad company, finds out how the partnership between William Jackson Palmer and Dr. William Bell helped to found the spa resort of Colorado Springs, discovers how cricket is an active sport in Colorado, and uncovers how Katharine Lee Bates founded America's national hymn by riding up to the top of Pike's Peak to see the views that inspired her.
9	"Santa Fe to Acoma, New Mexico"	2 February 2017	2.09	1.45
The ninth leg of Portillo's Frontier railroad journey sees him heading into New Mexico, and a land that was once a kingdom of the Spanish. Places visited include Santa Fe - La Fonda Hotel & Santa Fe Opera House, and Acoma Pueblo. He learns how Lew Wallace created his biblical epic, Ben-Hur, why John Crosby created operas with the natural beauty of Santa Fe as their backdrop, and of the success of Fred Harvey's restaurant chain, while discovering the history and Spanish colonial architecture of Santa Fe, before travelling to a pueblo community at Acoma to learn of its history, including the conflict between Native Americans and the Spanish, and the impact the railroad had on its people.
10	"Albuquerque, New Mexico to the Grand Canyon, Arizona"	3 February 2017	2.10	1.75
The final leg of Portillo's Frontier railroad journey takes him across New Mexico to Arizona, where it concludes at one of America's greatest natural wonders. Places visited include Albuquerque, Williams - Grand Canyon Railway, and Grand Canyon National Park. He views the old locomotive works of Albuquerque, meets with a volunteer group and their project to restore the Santa Fe 2926, one of the largest steam locomotives in the country, learns more about John Wesley Powell, samples chilli peppers while he tackles with making his own enchilada, before heading via train to see the great natural wonder of the Grand Canyon, both on the ground and in the air.

==== The Twin Cities to Memphis ====
No.	Title	Original release date	Prod. code	UK viewers (millions)
11	"The Twin Cities, Saint Paul"	6 February 2017	2.11	1.54
The first leg of Portillo's fourth railroad journey begins with an exploration of the Twin Cities. Destination visited (via metro) include Saint Paul - Union Depot, Cathedral of Saint Paul and James J. Hill House; and Minneapolis - Saint Anthony Falls. Portillo learns more about James J. Hill and his railroad empire, and of novelist F. Scott Fitzgerald and his creation, The Great Gatsby, looks inside the Saint Paul's former grand railroad station and its equally grand cathedral, experiences the jazz lifestyle of the 1920s, and discovers how Minneapolis grew into a major industrial hub as well as a major contributor of artificial limbs.
12	"The Twin Cities, Minneapolis"	7 February 2017	2.12	1.51
The second leg of Portillo's Midwest railroad journey continues his exploration of the Twin Cities. Destinations visited (via metro) include Fort Snelling, the American Swedish Institute, Minnehaha Park, and North-East Minneapolis. He finds out how the Dakota Sioux were treated by the United States, understands how Lutefisk was brought to North America by Swedish immigrants and partakes in an American-Swedish lunch, hears how Henry Wadsworth Longfellow created his epic poem, The Song of Hiawatha, and takes a look inside the restored passenger cars that were used on the Milwaukee Road.
13	"Red Wing, Minnesota to La Crosse, Wisconsin"	8 February 2017	2.13	1.56
The third leg of Portillo's Midwest railroad journey takes him along the Mississippi, along a stretch that was influenced by white settlers. Destinations visited include Red Wing, Winona, and La Crosse. He finds out more about Laura Ingalls Wilder and her literary work Little House on the Prairie, takes part in a tribal dance of the Dakota Sioux and hears how they were forced out of their lands by the US government, experiences the sport of lacrosse, learns how the Mississippi was made navigable in the 19th century for freight from bustling industry in the region, and visits a wildlife refuge to see the efforts to protect the river's flora and fauna, including the Bald eagle.
14	"Tomah, Wisconsin to Portage, Wisconsin"	9 February 2017	2.14	1.51
The fourth leg of Portillo's Midwest railroad journey leaves behind the Mississippi, and heads eastwards across Wisconsin. Destinations visited include Tomah, Wisconsin Dells, Baraboo - Circus World Museum, and Portage. He finds out how cranberries are grown and harvested, learns how H. H. Bennett developed photography that could capture motion and how he put the Dells on the tourist map, takes a look at a historic circus train and hears how the railroads brought the circus to the people of the United States, relaxes with a ride on a flume at the waterpark capital of the world, and learns of the history of the portage between the Fox River and the Wisconsin River.
15	"Milwaukee to Racine, Wisconsin"	10 February 2017	2.15	1.58
The fifth leg of Portillo's Midwest railroad journey brings him along the shoreline of Lake Michigan. Destinations visited include Milwaukee - Harley-Davidson factory, Turner Hall, Holler House and Milwaukee Public Museum; and Racine. He hears how Harley-Davidson created its first motorcycle and an iconic brand with a loyal following, finds out how German settlers left their mark on Milwaukee by taking part in some German gymnastics, indulges in some bowling at the oldest bowling alley in the country, discovers how Christopher Latham Sholes developed the QWERTY system used on typewriters and modern keyboards, and views some machinery of the company founded by Jerome Increase Case that helped to mechanise agriculture.
16	"Chicago, the Windy City"	13 February 2017	2.16	1.65
The sixth leg of Portillo's Midwest railroad journey enters Illinois and arrives at the distinctive American metropolis of Chicago. Destinations visited (via metro) include Union Station, Chicago River, Chicago Fire Academy, Willis Tower, Joliet, and Moody Church. He finds out how the city became the birthplace of the skyscraper and how they created its skyline, makes announcements at a restaurant bearing his name, trains alongside the city's fire department and learns about the fire of 1871, tries his hand at baseball at the home of the Joliet Slammers and hears how William Hulbert helped to found the National League, and discovers how the evangelists Dwight L. Moody and Ira D. Sankey met and became internationally famous for preaching gospel by both word and music.
17	"Chicago, US Rail Hub"	14 February 2017	2.17	1.62
The seventh leg of Portillo's Midwest railroad journey continues his explorations of Chicago. Destinations visited (via metro) include Belt Railway Company of Chicago, Palmer House Hotel, and McCook Reservoir. He explores the operations and history of the nation's biggest marshalling yard, gets taught how to bake a brownie to a recipe invented by Bertha Palmer, sees inside Palmer House and hears of its history, uncovers the story behind the raising of Chicago in the mid-19th century and the origins of the Sanitary and Ship Canal, and inspects a modern civil engineering project designed to help the city cope with its growing sanitation demands and reduce flooding.
18	"Homewood to Champaign, Illinois,"	15 February 2017	2.18	1.54
The eighth leg of Portillo's Midwest railroad journey begins heading southwards across the state of Illinois. Destinations visited include Homewood - Flossmoor Country Club, Kankakee, and Champaign - Monticello Railway Museum and University of Illinois. He learns how railroads influenced suburban life and the creation of country clubs before having a go on the fairway, discovers how Frank Lloyd Wright influenced American architecture by visiting a house he built beside the Kankakee River, attends a party beside the railroad platform that features a song sung by Arlo Guthrie and written by Steve Goodman, (City of New Orleans (song)), rides along a stretch of the former Illinois Central Railroad and hears more of its history, and visits a university engineering ranch dedicated to educating students in the construction of railroads, based on the teachings of Arthur Newell Talbot.
19	"Mattoon, Illinois to Columbus, Kentucky"	16 February 2017	2.19	1.43
The ninth leg of Portillo's Midwest railroad journey continues southwards through Illinois, finishing back on the banks of the Mississippi in Kentucky. Destinations visited include Mattoon - Lincoln Log Cabin State Historic Site, Centralia, Carbondale, and Columbus (via car). He uncovers how the early life of Abraham Lincoln shaped him into becoming the President of the United States and experiences the work in splitting rails, he learns how harvested fruit was transported and witnesses how apple butter is produced, sees the inner workings of a carillon, hears how coal miners of the 19th century formed unions for better conditions in the coal industry, and finds out how Ulysses S. Grant fought for control of the Confederate-held Columbus in the American Civil War and how decisive a turning point it was for the Union.
20	"Memphis, Tennessee"	17 February 2017	2.20	1.78
The final leg of Portillo's Midwest railroad journey brings him to his last stop at a city that was named after the Egyptian city of the same name – Memphis. Destinations visited include the Mississippi (via paddle steamer), Elmwood Cemetery, the Peabody Hotel, Beale Street, and Graceland. He learns more about the life of Mark Twain and of the dangers faced onboard paddle steamers in his time, discovers how devastating the outbreak of yellow fever was in Memphis during 1878, partakes in the custom of the Peabody Duck March, meets with Cedric Burnside and samples a bit of blues music, and visits the home of Elvis Presley to hear about his life, how he became the "King of Rock and Roll", and his impact on music.

=== Series 3 (2018) ===
Series 3 was repeated in June 2018 in a revised schedule (described as "Reversions") with two of the original 30-minute episodes merged, plus scenes not previously shown, to produce a series of ten 60-minute episodes. The episode order was also changed, with the Reno to San Diego journey first, followed by that from Boston to Toronto.

No.	Title	Original release date	Prod. code	UK viewers (millions)
Boston to Toronto
1	"Boston"	22 January 2018	3.01	N/A
2	"Boston to Concord, Massachusetts"	23 January 2018	3.02	N/A
3	"Plymouth to Nantucket"	24 January 2018	3.03	N/A
4	"Providence, Rhode Island to New London, Connecticut"	25 January 2018	3.04	N/A
5	"New Haven, Connecticut to Mount Washington, New Hampshire"	26 January 2018	3.05	N/A
6	"Burlington to Plattsburgh"	29 January 2018	3.06	N/A
7	"Montreal, Quebec"	30 January 2018	3.07	N/A
8	"Montreal to Ottawa"	31 January 2018	3.08	N/A
9	"Thousand Islands to Oshawa, Ontario"	1 February 2018	3.09	N/A
10	"Toronto"	2 February 2018	3.10	N/A
Reno to San Diego
11	"Reno, Nevada to Colfax, California"	5 February 2018	3.11	N/A
12	"Sacramento to Napa Valley"	6 February 2018	3.12	N/A
13	"San Francisco to Sausalito"	7 February 2018	3.13	N/A
14	"San Francisco"	8 February 2018	3.14	N/A
15	"Berkeley to Yosemite"	9 February 2018	3.15	N/A
16	"Santa Clara to Santa Cruz"	12 February 2018	3.16	N/A
17	"Monterey to Santa Barbara"	13 February 2018	3.17	N/A
18	"Los Angeles"	14 February 2018	3.18	N/A
19	"Los Angeles to Laguna Beach"	15 February 2018	3.19	N/A
20	"La Jolla to San Diego"	16 February 2018	3.20	N/A

=== Series 4 (2020) ===
This is a re-edited version of Great Alaskan Railroad Journeys and Great Canadian Railway Journeys (both first shown in early 2019), with two of the original 30-minute episodes merged, plus scenes not previously shown, to produce each 60-minute programme. The titles in the opening sequences are unaltered, except for episode 3, for which the final episode of Great Alaskan Railroad Journeys was integrated with the 6th episode of Great Canadian Railway Journeys under the title Great Alaskan & Canadian Railway Journeys. Subsequent 30-minute episodes from Great Canadian Railway Journeys were combined in pairs, thus: 7+8, 9+10, 1+2, 3+4, 5+11, 12+13, 14+15.

No.	Title	First broadcast	First broadcast of 30-minute episodes	Prod. code	UK viewers (millions)
1	"Ninilchik to Wasilla"	25 January 2020	7/8 January 2019	4.01	N/A
2	"Talkeetna to Juneau"	1 February 2020	9/10 January 2019	4.03	TBC
3	"Skagway to Vancouver"	8 February 2020	11/21 January 2019	4.03	TBC
4	"Vancouver to Kamloops"	15 February 2020	22/23 January 2019	4.04	TBC
5	"Kamloops to Calgary"	22 February 2020	24/25 January 2019	4.05	TBC
6	"Halifax to Prince Edward Island"	29 February 2020	14/15 January 2019	4.06	TBC
7	"Springhill Junction to Quebec City"	7 March 2020	16/17 January 2019	4.07	TBC
8	"Sainte-Anne-de-Beaupré to Winnipeg"	14 March 2020	18/28 January 2019	4.08	TBC
9	"Portage la Prairie to Saskatoon"	21 March 2020	29/30 January 2019	4.09	TBC
10	"Edmonton to Jasper"	28 March 2020	31 January/1 February 2019	4.10	TBC

== Books ==
A book to accompany the series, written by Michael Portillo and published by Simon & Schuster UK, was released in February 2017.
