= Great Canadian Railway Journeys =

BBC documentary series

- Genre: Travel documentary
- Presented by: Michael Portillo
- Composer: Jon Wygens
- Country of origin: United Kingdom
- Original language: English
- No. of series: 1
- No. of episodes: 15

Production
- Executive producer: John Comerford
- Producer: Alison Kreps
- Running time: 30 minutes
- Production company: Boundless

Original release
- Network: BBC Two; BBC Two HD
- Release: 14 January – 1 February 2019

Related
- Great British Railway Journeys; Great Continental Railway Journeys; Railways of the Great War with Michael Portillo (2014); Great American Railroad Journeys; Great Indian Railway Journeys; Great Alaskan Railroad Journeys; Great Australian Railway Journeys; Great Asian Railway Journeys

Great Canadian Railway Journeys is a BBC travel documentary series presented by Michael Portillo and aired on BBC Two. Using an 1899 copy of Appleton's Guidebook to the railways of the United States and Canada, Portillo explores historic Canadian railways and learns about the places along the way.

== Episodes ==
=== Series 1 (2019) ===
==== Halifax to La Malbaie ====
No.	Title	Original release date	Prod. code	UK viewers (millions)
1	"Halifax"	14 January 2019	1.01	N/A
2	"Pictou to Prince Edward Island"	15 January 2019	1.02	N/A
3	"Springhill Junction to Moncton"	16 January 2019	1.03	N/A
4	"Miramichi to Quebec City"	17 January 2019	1.04	N/A
5	"Saint-Anne de Beaupre to La Malbaie"	18 January 2019	1.05	N/A

==== Vancouver to Calgary ====
No.	Title	Original release date	Prod. code	UK viewers (millions)
6	"Vancouver"	21 January 2019	1.06	N/A
7	"Vancouver Island to San Juan Island"	22 January 2019	1.07	N/A
8	"Port Moody to Kamloops"	23 January 2019	1.08	N/A
9	"Kamloops to Banff"	24 January 2019	1.09	N/A
10	"Calgary"	25 January 2019	1.10	N/A

==== Winnipeg to Jasper ====
No.	Title	Original release date	Prod. code	UK viewers (millions)
11	"Winnipeg"	28 January 2019	1.11	N/A
12	"Portage la Prairie to Watrous"	29 January 2019	1.12	N/A
13	"Saskatoon"	30 January 2019	1.13	N/A
14	"Edmonton"	31 January 2019	1.14	N/A
15	"Hinton to Jasper"	1 February 2019	1.15	N/A
