= Great Indian Railway Journeys =

British television documentary series

- Genre: Travel documentary
- Presented by: Michael Portillo
- Country of origin: United Kingdom
- Original language: English
- No. of series: 1
- No. of episodes: 4

Production
- Executive producer: John Comerford
- Producer: Alison Kreps
- Running time: 60 minutes
- Production company: Boundless

Original release
- Network: BBC Two; BBC Two HD
- Release: 20 March – 10 April 2018

Related
- Great British Railway Journeys; Great Continental Railway Journeys; Railways of the Great War with Michael Portillo (2014); Great American Railroad Journeys; Great Alaskan Railroad Journeys; Great Canadian Railway Journeys; Great Australian Railway Journeys; Great Asian Railway Journeys

Great Indian Railway Journeys is a British television documentary series presented by Michael Portillo, in which he travels on the railway networks of India, referring to a 1913 copy of Bradshaw’s Handbook of Indian, Foreign And Colonial Travel, as he visits various destinations throughout India.

== Episodes ==
=== Series 1 (2018) ===
No.	Title	Original release date	Prod. code	UK viewers (millions)
1	"Amritsar to Shimla"	20 March 2018	1.01	N/A
The route starts at Amritsar, passing through Ludhiana, Ambala, Chandigarh, Kalka, finishing at Shimla.
2	"Jodhpur to Delhi"	27 March 2018	1.02	N/A
Forming a bond with elephants After a visit to Amer Fort, where concerns about cruelty have inspired new ways of connecting with elephants, Michael visits a sanctuary to learn about human-elephant interaction. The route starts at Jodhpur, passing through Osiyan, Jaipur, Bandikui Junction, Agra, finishing at Delhi.
3	"Mysuru to Chennai"	3 April 2018	1.03	N/A
The route starts at Mysuru, passing through Bengaluru, Bangarapet, finishing at Chennai.
4	"Lucknow to Kolkata"	10 April 2018	1.04	N/A
