= Great Continental Railway Journeys =

British television travel series

- Genre: Travel documentary
- Presented by: Michael Portillo
- Composer: Jon Wygens
- Country of origin: United Kingdom
- Original language: English
- No. of series: 9
- No. of episodes: 82

Production
- Executive producer: John Comerford
- Producers: Michelle Heeley (series 1); Alison Kreps
- Running time: Series 1 - 7: 60 minutes Series 8 - 9: 28 minutes
- Production company: Boundless

Original release
- Network: BBC Two (2012-); BBC Two HD {(2013-); BBC HD (2012)
- Release: 8 November 2012 – present

Related
- Great Railway Journeys; Great British Railway Journeys; Railways of the Great War with Michael Portillo (2014); Great American Railroad Journeys; Great Indian Railway Journeys; Great Alaskan Railroad Journeys; Great Canadian Railway Journeys; Great Australian Railway Journeys

Great Continental Railway Journeys is a British television documentary series presented by Michael Portillo. In the early series, Portillo explores the railway networks of continental Europe, but in later series he also ventured further afield. He refers to a 1913 copy of Bradshaw's Continental Railway Guide, as he describes how the places he visits have changed since Edwardian times. The first series was originally broadcast on BBC Two in 2012 and the seventh series first aired in 2020. After a five year hiatus, it was announced that a new series was to be shown in 2025 as part of the BBC's contribution to the "Railway 200" celebrations.

== Series overview ==
Series	Episodes	Originally released	
Series	Episodes	First released	Last released
1	5	8 November 2012	6 December 2012
2	6	27 October 2013	1 December 2013
3	6	5 November 2014	10 December 2014
4	6	16 October 2015	27 November 2015
5	6	20 September 2016	25 October 2016
6	2	8 March 2018	15 March 2018
7	6	29 July 2020	10 September 2020
8	20	10 March 2025	4 April 2025
9	15	18 May 2026	5 June 2026

== Episodes ==
=== Series 1 (2012) ===
The first series was originally broadcast on BBC Two in 2012. Portillo made five separate journeys across France, Germany, the Low Countries, Switzerland, and the countries whose land made up the former Austro-Hungarian Empire.

No.	Title	Original release date
1	"London to Monte Carlo"	8 November 2012
Paris, the Belle Époque, the Cote D'Azur and Monte Carlo.
2	"Hungary to Austria"	15 November 2012
Austria-Hungary, Budapest, Bratislava, Vienna, Salzburg, Salzkammergut and Lehár Villa at Bad Ischl.
3	"Berlin to the Rhine"	22 November 2012
Berlin, the Harz Mountains, the Ruhr Valley, the river Rhine, and the vineyards of Rheingau.
4	"Switzerland"	29 November 2012
Basel, Zürich, the Alps, Lake Lucerne, and Europe's highest railway station at the top of Jungfraujoch.
5	"Amsterdam to Northern France"	6 December 2012
The pre-war Low Countries, Brussels, the French sector of the Western Front, the forest of Compiègne, and the signing of the Armistice.

=== Series 2 (2013) ===
Production of a second series included filming in Spain and Gibraltar in May and June 2013, following the Ronda–Algeciras railway line, built in the 1890s by British interests under the Algeciras Gibraltar Railway Company, for the benefit of British officers stationed in Gibraltar wanting to travel to Spain and the rest of Europe. To avoid offending Spanish sensitivities, the line was built concluding in Algeciras, a town in Spain on the opposite side of the Bay of Gibraltar, rather than at the Gibraltar border. Despite it having no direct connection to the European railway network, a chapter was devoted to Gibraltar in the 1913 guidebook.

No.	Title	Original release date
1	"Madrid to Gibraltar"	27 October 2013
The assassination attempt at the royal wedding of the British princess Victoria Eugenie and King Alfonso XIII in 1906, Cordoba, the feria, Andalusia, Seville, the Royal Tobacco Factory, Jerez, Winston Churchill's diplomatic mission to Algeciras on Spain's Costa del Sol, and the Rock of Gibraltar.
2	"Turin to Venice"	3 November 2013
The Italian Job, Italian cars, fashion in Milan, Lake Como, Verona, the 'House of the Capulets', and the Venice Biennale art exhibition.
3	"Dresden to Kiel"	10 November 2013
Wagner, Leipzig, Braunschweig, beer, Hamburg, the model railway at Miniatur Wunderland, the rivalry between Kaiser Wilhelm of Germany and his uncle King Edward VII at the Kiel Week yacht races, and how British yachtsmen spied on the German navy.
4	"Copenhagen to Oslo"	17 November 2013
One of the world's oldest roller-coasters in Copenhagen's Tivoli Gardens, the Øresund Bridge linking Denmark to Sweden, Vladimir Lenin, Lund, a smörgåsbord, a Highland Fling in Gothenburg, the Volvo, and Norway's heritage of plays, paintings and polar exploration.
5	"Prague to Munich"	24 November 2013
Art Nouveau architecture of the Czech capital, the tango, Mariánské Lázně ('the spa of the kings'), the Škoda factory in Plzeň, Bavaria, a fire-breathing dragon in Furth im Wald, Nuremberg, science and technology.
6	"Bordeaux to Bilbao"	1 December 2013
The Atlantic coast of France and Spain, Bordeaux, claret, trams, Biarritz, San Sebastián and the Basque Country.

=== Series 3 (2014) ===
The third series had six journeys, in one of which Portillo went further afield to travel on the railways in modern-day Israel.

No.	Title	Original release date
1	"Tula to Saint Petersburg"	5 November 2014
A Russian Orthodox choir, the country estate of Yasnaya Polyana (where Tolstoy wrote his masterpieces), Caspian Sea, Moscow, how to make pelmeni, Belorussky railway terminal in Moscow, the Romanov royal family, the Bolshoi Theatre, the Sanduny Baths, the high-speed Sapsan to St Petersburg, the Grand Hotel Europe, St Petersburg, the Nevsky Prospect, the Winter Palace, the Hermitage Museum, the first railway ever built in Russia, the village of Tsarskoye Selo and the Russian Revolution.
2	"Rome to Taormina"	12 November 2014
The Vespa, the Spanish Steps, Naples, Portici, Mount Vesuvius, pizza, the island of Capri, Reggio Calabria, Messina, the ancient hilltop town of Taormina, and Mount Etna.
3	"Warsaw to Kraków"	19 November 2014
The planned destruction of Warsaw during the Second World War, Poland's national icon Frederic Chopin, the polonaise dance; Łódź – Poland's film industry; Poznań – the last steam-powered commuter train at Wolsztyn; Wrocław – Market Square, Wrocław's dwarfs, the National Rail Carriage Factory; Kraków – milk bar and the Trabant car.
4	"La Coruña to Lisbon"	26 November 2014
Galicia, John Moore, the Celtic roots of the Galician people, bagpipes, the pilgrims' trail to Santiago de Compostela, the West Galician Railway, a sardine cannery, fishing, São Bento railway station in Porto, the birth of Britain's long alliance with the Portuguese, a glass of 1953 port, the Factory House, the Douro line, Douro Valley, Coimbra, the Fado, a high-speed train to Lisbon, the Santa Justa Lift, the harbour at Belém, Portugal's national sweetmeat, the Palace Square and the Portuguese royal family.
5	"Haifa to the Negev"	3 December 2014
The Holy Land of Israel, the Shrine of the Báb, Mount Carmel, the Hejaz Railway, Tel Aviv, the roots of the Israeli–Palestinian conflict, Jerusalem, the Jaffa to Jerusalem railway, the Church of the Holy Sepulchre, the Western Wall, the Dome of the Rock, the Al Aqsa Mosque, the separation barrier between Jerusalem and the West Bank, Bethlehem, the Arab Women's Union, the Dead Sea, Beersheba, the London-based Palestine Exploration Fund, the Negev Desert and Lawrence of Arabia.
6	"Lyon to Marseille"	10 December 2014
The Mediterranean coast, Meres Lyonnaises, the omelette, the Palais de la Bourse, the assassination of Marie François Sadi Carnot, tandem cycling, the Tour de France, light aircraft, Avignon, the lavender fields of Provence, Châteauneuf-du-Pape, Arles, the mistral and supertankers.

=== Series 4 (2015) ===
The fourth series aired in 2015. It took Portillo to Bulgaria, Turkey, Austria, Italy, Slovenia, Greece, Germany, and Spain.

No.	Title	Original release date
1	"Sofia to Istanbul"	16 October 2015
The Balkans, the Orient Express, the ancient city of Plovdiv, the region of Rumelia, the former capital of the Ottoman Empire (Edirne), the Bosphorus, Turkish delight, and the Marmaray metro line underneath the Bosphorus.
2	"Vienna to Trieste"	23 October 2015
A pre-Cold War spy, the 'scandal concert' that caused a riot in 1913, the Habsburg imperial line across the Semmering Pass, Graz, the Lurgrotte Caves, Slovenia, an earthquake in Ljubljana, and cafe culture in Italy.
3	"Pisa to Lake Garda"	30 October 2015
The Maserati sports car, the Leaning Tower of Pisa, the Carrara marble used by Michelangelo, Bologna, spaghetti bolognese, tagliatelle al ragu, and a high-speed boat trip across Lake Garda.
4	"Athens to Thessaloniki"	13 November 2015
The Acropolis, moussaka, baklava, Greek financial crises, the 1896 Summer Olympics, a boat trip through the Corinth Canal, Delphi, the Oracle, the Little Train of Pelion, the village of Milies, the Greek Orthodox Church, and the 1913 assassination of George I of Greece
5	"The Black Forest to Hannover"	20 November 2015
Hansel and Gretel, the cuckoo clock, Heidelberg Castle, share-dealing on the Frankfurt Stock Exchange, the University of Göttingen and its duelling fraternities, the scientists who laid the foundation for Germany's transport systems, the Göttingen wind tunnel, and model trains.
6	"Barcelona to Mallorca"	27 November 2015
The Spanish Civil War, the Balearic island of Mallorca, a 1912 vintage railway and a 1913 tram, a Catalan people tower, how to make paella, Antoni Gaudí, the Sagrada Família, and the art nouveau Palace of Catalan Music.

=== Series 5 (2016) ===
No.	Title	Original release date
1	"Transylvania to the Black Sea"	20 September 2016
Transylvania, including Brașov and Bran Castle, the Carpathian Mountains, Peleș Castle in Sinaia, the oil refinery at Ploiești, Romania's most famous composer George Enescu in the capital Bucharest, and the oldest inhabited city in Romania, Constanța on the Black Sea.
2	"Zermatt to Geneva"	27 September 2016
From the Swiss Alps to the shores of Lake Geneva. Caught up in a war zone with the Red Cross and rescued from an avalanche by a St Bernard puppy. Takes to the skies in a vintage biplane and tries watchmaking, James Bond style.
3	"Tangier to Marrakesh"	4 October 2016
From the Mediterranean port of Tangier to the Berber city of Marrakesh. Michael visits Fez, and then heads to Casablanca and the desert city of the Berbers; he then travels to a souk, finally arriving in Marrakesh.
4	"Genoa to the Brenner Pass"	11 October 2016
From the Italian Riviera to the Austrian Alps. Michael visits remote villages of the Cinque Terre, then heads to Parma. Next up is the Alps, stopping off in Rovereto and ending at the Brenner Pass, home to one of the world's longest rail tunnels.
5	"Riga to Tampere"	18 October 2016
The Latvian capital, Riga, the Singing Revolution at a ruined 13th century cathedral in Tallinn, ice swimming, the Finnish composer Jean Sibelius in Helsinki, and one of Finland's 180,000 lakes in Tampere.
6	"Rotterdam to Utrecht"	25 October 2016
The port of Rotterdam, the windmills of Kinderdijk, pottery in Delft, The Hague, plant auctions in Haarlem, cycling in Amsterdam, and the main hub of the Dutch railway network in Utrecht.

=== Series 6 (2018) ===
No.	Title	Original release date
1	"Kyiv to Odesa"	8 March 2018
Armed with his trusty 1913 Bradshaw's Continental Railway Guide, Michael Portillo travels to the Ukrainian capital, Kyiv. Portillo learns more of the city's past under Soviet control. Next stop is Lviv, the seventh-largest city in Ukraine. Here he tries making Varenyky, the popular Ukrainian dumplings. Portillo boards the night express to the Black Sea city of Odesa.
2	"Batumi to Baku"	15 March 2018
3	"Amritsar to Shimla"	28 March 2018
See Great Indian Railway Journeys
4	"Jodhpur to New Delhi"	27 March 2018
See Great Indian Railway Journeys
5	"Mysuru to Chennai"	3 April 2018
See Great Indian Railway Journeys
6	"Lucknow to Kolkata"	10 April 2018
See Great Indian Railway Journeys

=== Series 7 (2020) ===
No.	Title	Original release date
1	"Salamanca to Canfranc"	29 July 2020
Now using a 1936 edition of Bradshaw's Continental Handbook, Portillo visits the city of Salamanca, in northwestern Spain, where he discovers his family's past during the brutal Spanish Civil War. In Madrid, he views Pablo Picasso's famous Guernica painting. In Zaragoza, he gets to test drive a train and later learns to dance the jota. In Huesca, Portillo meets the son of author George Orwell, and then travels to Canfranc Station, near the border with France, and learns of its role during the Second World War.
2	"Orléans to Reims"	5 August 2020
Portillo begins this journey in the historic city of Orléans, in north-central France. At Orléans Sainte-Croix Cathedral, he learns more of its association with Joan of Arc. After arriving at Tours, he visits Château de Candé, where King Edward VIII and Wallis Simpson's wedding took place. After a trip to the Le Mans racetrack, Portillo travels to Versailles. In the French capital, Paris, he visits the Arc de Triomphe, Folies Bergère and the Eiffel Tower. In the Champagne region east of Paris, he makes a stop at Reims Cathedral, before ending his trip at the Champagne house of Pommery.
3	"Berlin to Stuttgart"	19 August 2020
After arriving in the German capital, Berlin, Portillo is reminded of its turbulent past. He visits the Reichstag and the city's Olympic stadium, site of the 1936 Summer Olympics. After visiting Potsdam, he explores Weimar in central Germany, a city that has twelve buildings on the UNESCO World Heritage list. In Nuremberg, Portillo travels to the Zeppelin Field and learns more of the city's World War II connection with Hitler and the Nazis. His final stop is the industrial city of Stuttgart, where he visits the Porsche factory and learns of the origin of the Volkswagen Beetle. Episode was originally due to air on 12 August 2020
4	"Palermo to Mt Etna"	26 August 2020
Portillo begins his journey in Palermo, capital of the Italian island of Sicily. Whilst visiting the Palazzo delle Poste government building he learns of its connection to fascist dictator Benito Mussolini. Portillo travels to the southern city of Agrigento, here he explores the ancient Greek Temple of Juno, the gateway to the Valley of the Temples. He then travels inland to Enna to visit the former mafia stronghold of Gangi. In Syracuse, Portillo visits the controversial monolith – Monumento ai Caduti italiani d'Africa (Monument to the Italian Fallen of Africa). The final leg of the journey is to Mascali, to visit Europe's most active volcano, Mount Etna. Portillo travels the Ferrovia Circumetnea narrow-gauge railway to take in the magnificent vistas around the volcano, before taking the Funivia dell'Etna cablecar to the summit.
5	"Linz to Bratislava"	2 September 2020
In Austria's third-largest city – Linz, Michael Portillo take the tram up to Pöstlingberg. Back in Linz, he samples the city's famous Linz cake and learns more of Adolf Hitler's connection with Linz. After delving into the history of Czechoslovakia's first president, Tomáš Masaryk, Portillo travels to České Budějovice, Czech Republic. Next stop is Prague, capital of the Czech Republic. After alighting at Prague's main railway station, he takes in the sights, including the Prague astronomical clock and the Old Town Square. Michael discovers the history of the little-known Czechoslovak Legion. After learning more of the story of Nicholas Winton, who helped save hundreds of Jewish people from the Nazis during World War II, Michael travels to Brno. Following a visit to the Punkva Caves, Portillo ends his journey in Slovakia's capital – Bratislava.
6	"Stockholm to the Arctic Circle"	10 September 2020
In the final episode of the series, Portillo begins his journey in the Swedish capital, Stockholm. After taking in views of the city from the roof of the Old Parliament House, learns more of the country's inter-war history onboard a tram, then heads to the Royal Institute of Technology to see some of the latest Swedish technology innovations. He then travels to Uppsala and visits the city's university, before catching a train to Marielund to celebrate the Swedish Midsummer. Continuing north to Mora, Michael visits a Dala horse factory. After an overnight stay at Östersund, he visits a Sámi community in Vilhelmina. In the Arctic Circle town of Kiruna (the northernmost town in Sweden), Michael spends the night at an Ice Hotel. Portillo's final stop is Abisko and its scientific research station that has been conducting important research into climate change.

=== Series 8 (2025) ===
No.	Title	Original release date
1	"Pula to Pazin"	10 March 2025
2	"Buzet to Pag"	11 March 2025
3	"Knin to Split"	12 March 2025
4	"Sarajevo"	13 March 2025
5	"Mostar to Dubrovnik"	14 March 2025
6	"Bergen to Flåm"	17 March 2025
7	"Myrdal to Heddal"	18 March 2025
8	"Larvik to Holstebro"	19 March 2025
9	"Aarhus to Odense"	20 March 2025
10	"Roskilde to Copenhagen"	21 March 2025
11	"Maienfeld to the Rhine Gorge"	24 March 2025
12	"Sedrun to Schwyz"	25 March 2025
13	"Zurich"	26 March 2025
14	"Rotkreuz to Brienz"	27 March 2025
15	"Zweisimmen to Lausanne"	28 March 2025
16	"Nantes to Lorient"	31 March 2025
17	"Brest to St Brieuc"	1 April 2025
18	"Rennes to Mont Saint-Michel"	2 April 2025
19	"Bayeux to Argentan"	3 April 2025
20	"Lisieux to Giverny"	4 April 2025

=== Series 9 (2026) ===
The ninth series began airing from 18 May 2026 on BBC2 and BBC iPlayer.

No.	Title	Original release date
1	"Cagliari to Porto Flavia"	18 May 2026
2	"Mandas to Laconi"	19 May 2026
3	"Nuoro to Macomer"	20 May 2026
4	"Ajaccio to Vizzavona"	21 May 2026
5	"Vivario to Corte"	22 May 2026
6	"St Pancras to Brussels"	25 May 2026
11	"Sopron to Keleti"	26 May 2026
12	"Budapest"	27 May 2026
13	"Hűvösvölgy to Kobanya"	28 May 2026
14	"Szeged"	29 May 2026
15	"Eger to Hortobágy"	1 June 2026
7	"Brussels to Ghent"	2 June 2026
8	"Knokke-Heist to Bruges"	3 June 2026
9	"Brussels to La Louvière"	4 June 2026
10	"Namur to Florenville"	5 June 2026

Due to the Buggenhout train collision on 26 May 2026, episodes 11 to 15 were moved up in the airing order, displacing episodes 7 to 10, which were in turn postponed. Therefore episodes 7 to 15 were not shown in episode order.

== DVD releases ==
As of 2021, series 1-6 of Great Continental Railway Journeys have been released on DVD by FremantleMedia under licence from Boundless and the BBC.

Series	UK release date
Series 1	29 May 2013
Series 2	28 April 2014
Series 3	23 March 2015
Series 4	21 November 2016
Series 5	13 February 2017
Series 6	30 April 2018

== Books ==
Great Continental Railway Journeys, written by Michael Portillo, was published by Simon & Schuster UK in October 2015.
