= Great Australian Railway Journeys =

- Genre: Travel documentary
- Presented by: Michael Portillo
- Country of origin: United Kingdom
- Original language: English
- No. of seasons: 1
- No. of episodes: 6

Production
- Production location: Australia
- Running time: 60 minutes
- Production company: Boundless

Original release
- Network: BBC Two
- Release: 26 October – 30 November 2019

Related
- Great British Railway Journeys; Great Continental Railway Journeys; Railways of the Great War with Michael Portillo (2014); Great American Railroad Journeys; Great Indian Railway Journeys; Great Alaskan Railroad Journeys; Great Canadian Railway Journeys; Great Asian Railway Journeys

Great Australian Railway Journeys is a BBC Two documentary series produced by Boundless and presented by Michael Portillo.

== Broadcast ==
Great Australian Railway Journeys was first broadcast on BBC Two over six consecutive Saturday nights from 26 October 2019.

== Episodes ==
No.	Title	Original release date
1	"Port Augusta to Darwin"	26 October 2019
Portillo traces the route of The Ghan from Port Augusta to Darwin, travelling on the Pichi Richi Railway, meeting the indigenous people of Alice Springs, visiting a kangaroo sanctuary and joining Australians to mark the anniversary of Anzac Day
2	"Sydney to Broken Hill"	2 November 2019
Portillo travels from Sydney to Broken Hill visiting Hyde Park Barracks, the Sydney Opera House, Bondi Beach and the Scenic Railway
3	"Adelaide to Perth"	9 November 2019
Portillo travels across the Nullarbor Plain from Adelaide to Perth on the Indian Pacific
4	"Canberra to Melbourne"	16 November 2019
Portillo travels from Canberra to Melbourne visiting Parliament House, the Melbourne Cricket Ground and the Puffing Billy Railway
5	"Kuranda to Townsville"	23 November 2019
Portillo travels from Kuranda to Townsville visiting the Great Barrier Reef
6	"Newcastle to Brisbane"	30 November 2019
Portillo travels from Newcastle to Brisbane visiting a coal loader and Koala hospital in Port Macquarie
