= Base period =

Economic measurement

In economics, a base period or reference period is a point in time used as a reference point for comparison with other periods. It is generally used as a benchmark for measuring financial or economic data. Base periods typically provide a point of reference for economic studies, consumer demand, and unemployment benefit claims.

In public transport scheduling, the base period is the period of reduced service on weekdays that generally exists between the morning and afternoon rush hours.

== See also ==
- Base period price
- Bureau of Labor Statistics
- Economic indicator
- Gross domestic product
- Consumer price index
