= Referee (disambiguation) =

A referee is a person of authority in a number of sports games.

Specific sports referees include:

- Referee (American football)
- Referee (association football)
- Referee (basketball)
- Referee (boxing)
- Referee (futsal)
- Referee (ice hockey)
- Referee (professional wrestling)
- Referee (rugby league)
- Referee (rugby union)
- Referee (tennis)
- Umpire in other sports

A referee may also be:

- One who engages in scholarly peer review
- One who provides a reference
- In law, a special referee, a judge who acts on matters of fact only
- A gamemaster for a role-playing game

Referee or The Referee may also refer to:

- Referee (Queoff), a public sculpture by Tom Queoff in Milwaukee, Wisconsin, US
- The Referee (newspaper), published in Sydney, Australia from 1886 to 1939
- The Referee (1922 film), an American silent sports drama film
- The Referee (2010 film), a Swedish documentary
- Sunday Referee, a British newspaper founded as The Referee
- Referee, a magazine on sports officiating published in Wisconsin, U.S.
- The Lysaght Referee, Australian book of technical data fora iron workers

== See also ==
- Arbitrator, a person authorized to resolve legal disputes
- Refer (disambiguation)
- Reference (disambiguation)
- Umpire (disambiguation)
