= Point of reference =

Point of reference is the intentional use of one thing to indicate something else, and may refer to:

- Reference point (disambiguation), general usage
- Frame of reference, physics usage
