= Public transport timetable =

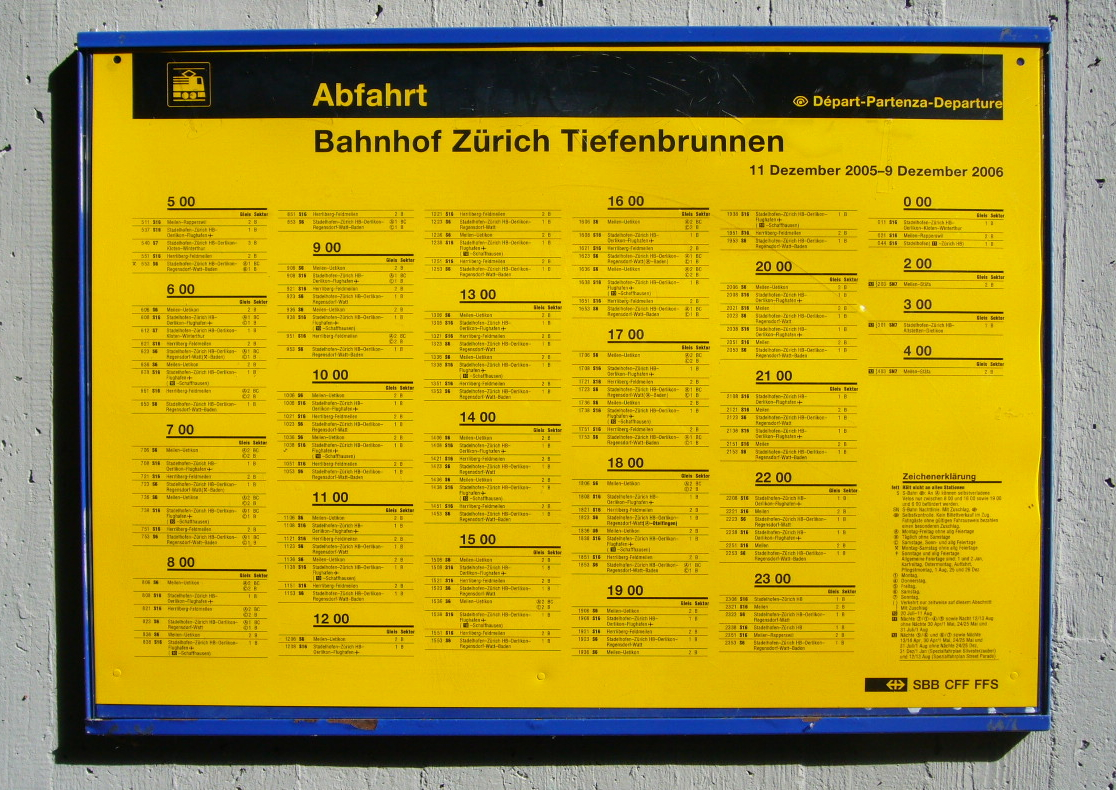
List of train departures in the form of a yellow poster (common in Europe) at Zürich Tiefenbrunnen railway station

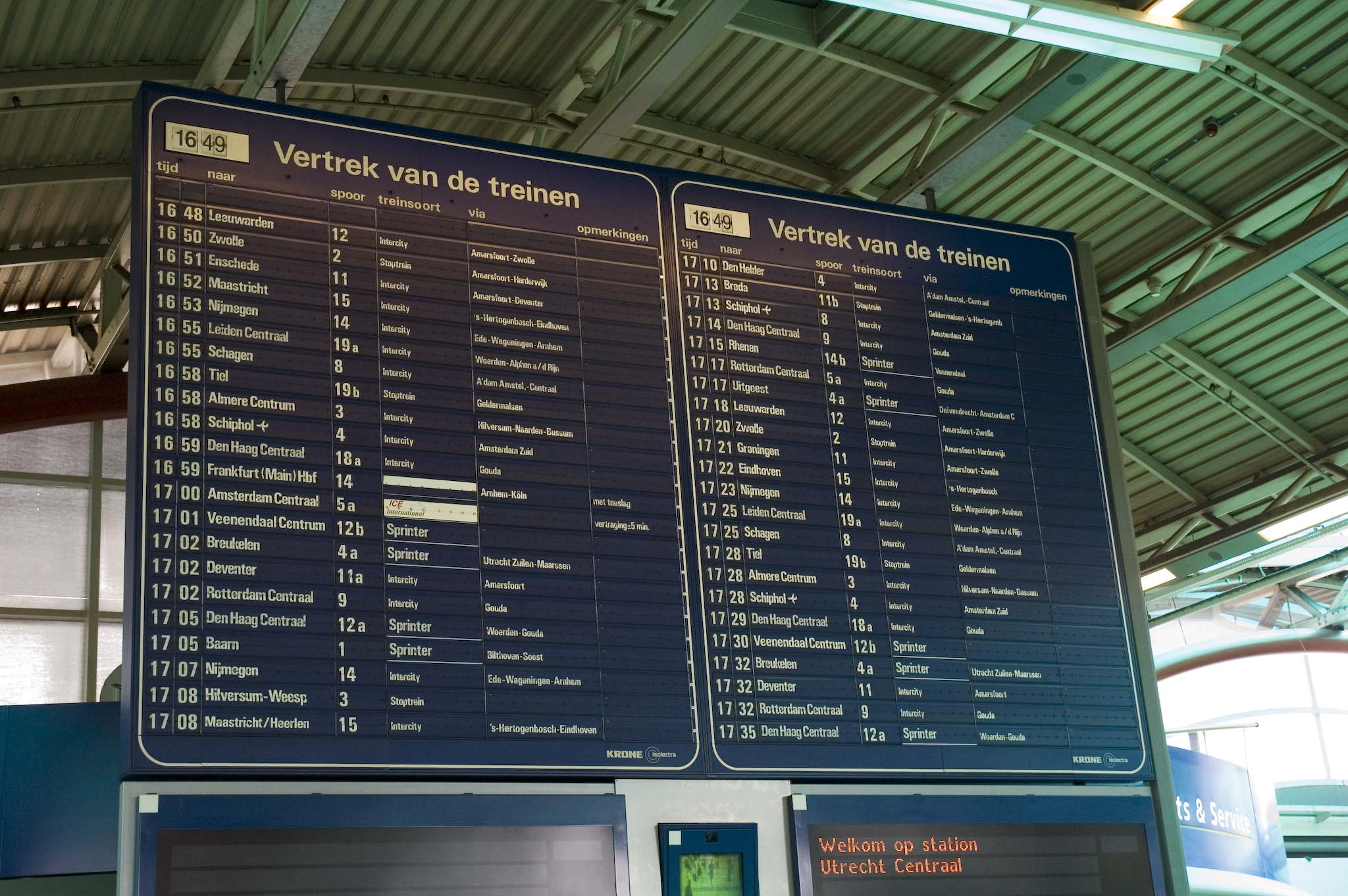
Dynamic display in the central hall at Utrecht Centraal railway station, listing departures

A public transport timetable (also timetable and North American English schedule) is a document setting out information on public transport service times. Both public timetables to assist passengers with planning a trip and internal timetables to inform employees exist. Typically, the timetable will list the times when a service is scheduled to arrive at and depart from specified locations. It may show all movements at a particular location or all movements on a particular route or for a particular stop. Traditionally this information was provided in printed form, for example as a leaflet or poster. It is now also often available in a variety of electronic formats.

In the 2000s, public transport route planners / intermodal journey planners have proliferated and offer travelers the convenience that the computer program looks at all timetables so the travellers don't need to.

A "timetable" may also refer to the same information in abstract form, not specifically published, e.g. "A new timetable has been introduced".

== History ==
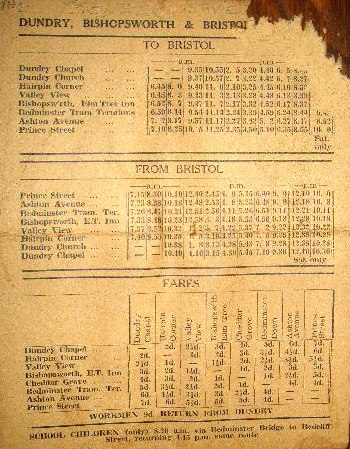
A matrix timetable for bus services in England in the 1940s and 1950s

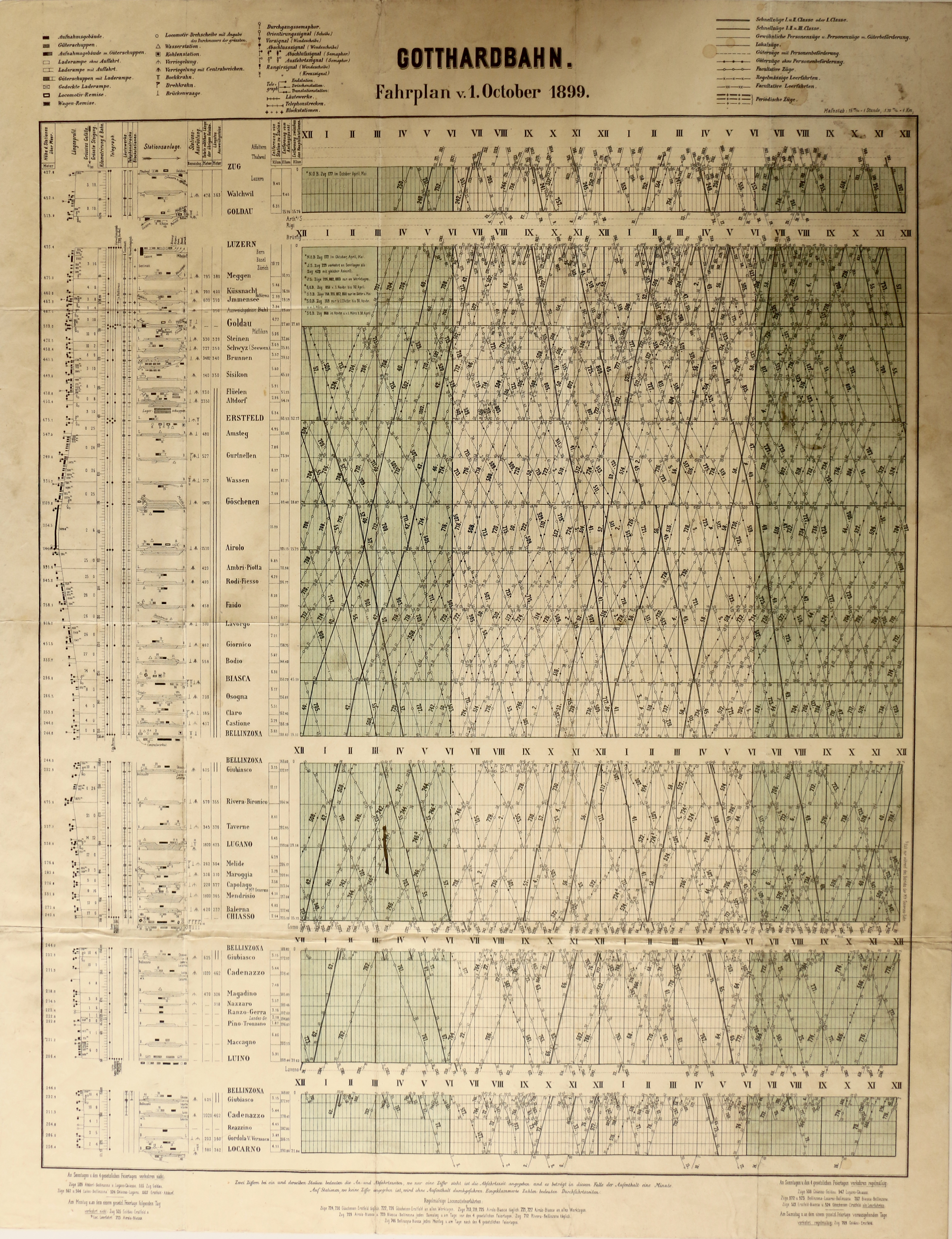
Timetable of Gotthard railway in 1899

The first compilation of railway timetables in the United Kingdom was produced in 1839 by George Bradshaw. Greater speeds and the need for more accurate timings led to the introduction of standard railway time in Great Western Railway timetables in 1840, when all their trains were scheduled to "London time", i.e. Greenwich Mean Time (GMT), which replaced solar time. Until railway time was introduced, local times for London, Birmingham, Bristol and Manchester could differ by as much as 16 to 20 minutes; in India and North America these differences could be 60 minutes or more.

The European Rail Timetable, a compendium of the schedules of major European railway services, has been in publication since 1873 (appearing monthly since 1883). Originally, and for most of its history, it was published by Thomas Cook & Son and included Thomas Cook or Cook's in its title. Although Thomas Cook Group plc ceased publication in 2013, the Thomas Cook European Rail Timetable was revived by a new company in early 2014 as simply the European Rail Timetable. From 1981 to 2010, Cook also produced a similar bi-monthly Overseas volume covering the rest of the world, and some of that content was moved into the European Timetable in 2011.

== Representation ==
A timetable can be produced dynamically, on request, for a particular journey on a particular day around a particular time (see journey planner, below), or in a timetable that gives an overview of all services, in a particular category, and is valid for a specified period. The latter could take the form of a book, leaflet, billboard, or a (set of) computer file(s), and makes it much easier to find out, for example, whether a transport service at a particular time is offered every day at that time, and if not, on which days; with a journey planner one may have to check every day of the year separately for this.

=== Matrix format ===
Many timetables comprise tables with services shown in columns, and stations or stops on the rows of the table. There will often be separate tables for each direction of travel, and often separate (pairs of) tables for working days, weekends and holidays. Generally the times shown against each station or stop will be the departure time, except for the last stop of the service which will be the arrival time. The left hand column will list the stations in route order, and the other columns are arranged from left to right in chronological order.

If the service is scheduled to wait, both arrival and departure times might be shown on consecutive rows. If a slow service is overtaken by a fast service, the slow service will often occupy more than one column, to keep the times in order. There may be additional rows showing connecting services.

In most parts of the world times are shown using the 24-hour clock (although in the United States the 12-hour clock, with the addition of "am/A" or "pm/P" or with pm times in bold, is more often used). If services run at the same minutes past each hour for part of the day, the legend "and at the same minutes past each hour" or similar wording may be shown instead of individual timings.

Other information may be shown, often at the tops of the columns, such as day(s) of operation, validity of tickets for each service, whether seat reservations are required, the type of vehicle used (e.g. for heritage railways and airline timetables), the availability of on-board facilities such as refreshments, availability of classes, and a service number. Timetables with services arranged in rows of tables and stops or stations in columns are less common but otherwise similar to timetables with services in columns.

=== Stop-specific displays ===
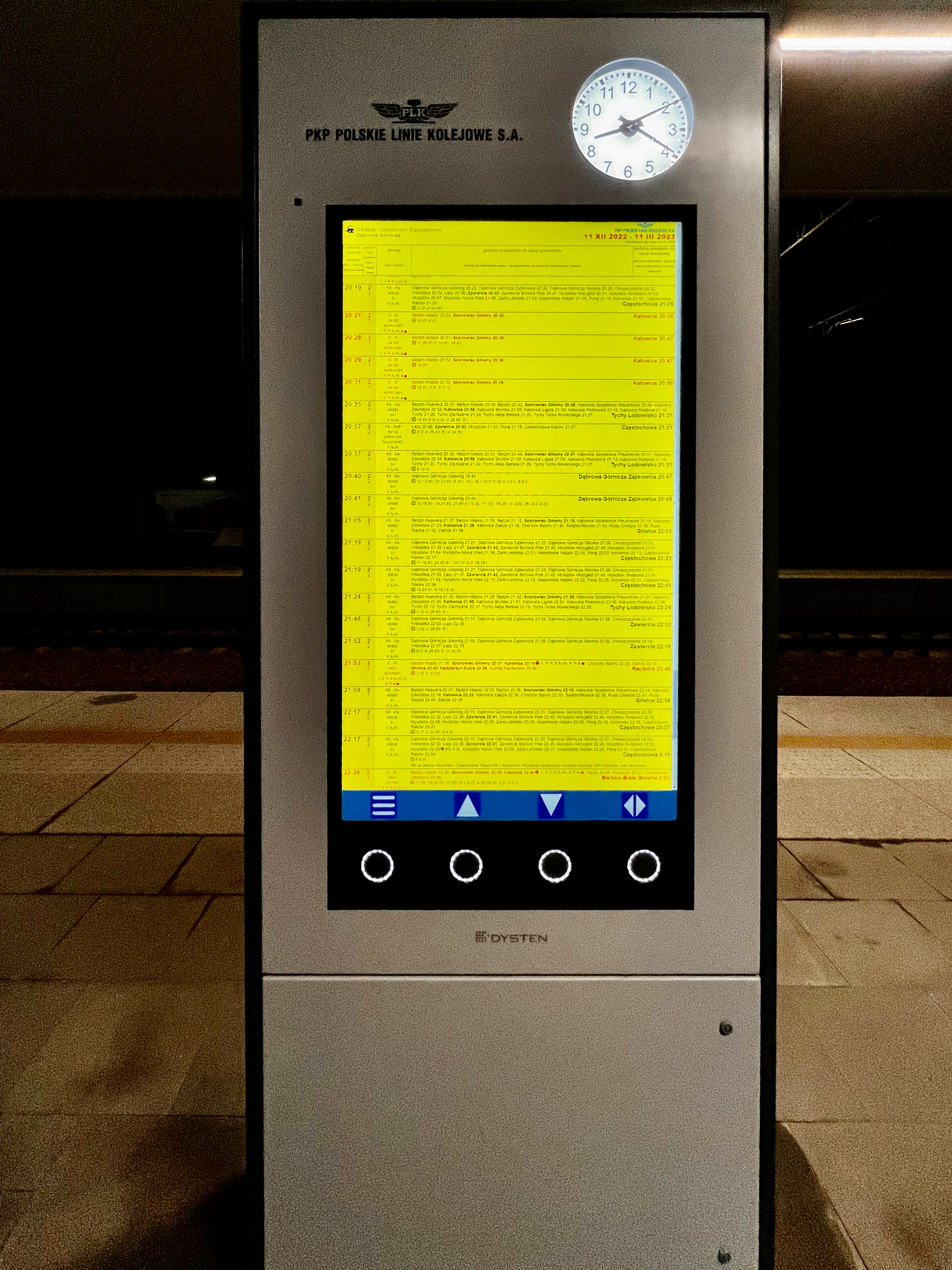
Electronic display with railway timetable in Dąbrowa Górnicza

Some timetables, particularly at railway stations and bus stops, list the times that services depart from that location, sometimes with other information such as destinations, types (train), and stopping conditions. Again, there may be separate lists for different days of the week. There may be a separate list for each line/direction, or a combined chronological list (as in the picture). In parts of mainland Europe train departures are listed on a yellow poster, and arrivals on a white poster. These posters are placed at entrances to stations and on platforms.

=== Electronic displays ===
Dynamic electronic displays in stations may be at a central place and list the next few departures for each line, or all departures in the next hour. Displays on platforms usually just show the next departure (or perhaps the next few) from that platform.

== Formats ==
Timetables may be printed as books, booklets, folded or plain cards or paper, posters, or hand-written on posters or blackboards, shown on back-lit displays, or published on-line or as SMS or text messages.

With the development of the internet and electronic systems, conventional thick paper timetables are gradually being replaced by website searching or CD-ROM style timetables, and the publication of comprehensive printed timetables is generally decreasing.

Transport schedule data itself is increasingly being made available to the public digitally, as specified in the General Transit Feed Specification (GTFS) format.

GTFS consists of a static schedule component and a separate GTFS Realtime specification, the latter allows public transport agencies to distribute updates such as delays, cancellations, changed routes, service alerts and vehicle positions alongside scheduled timetable information.

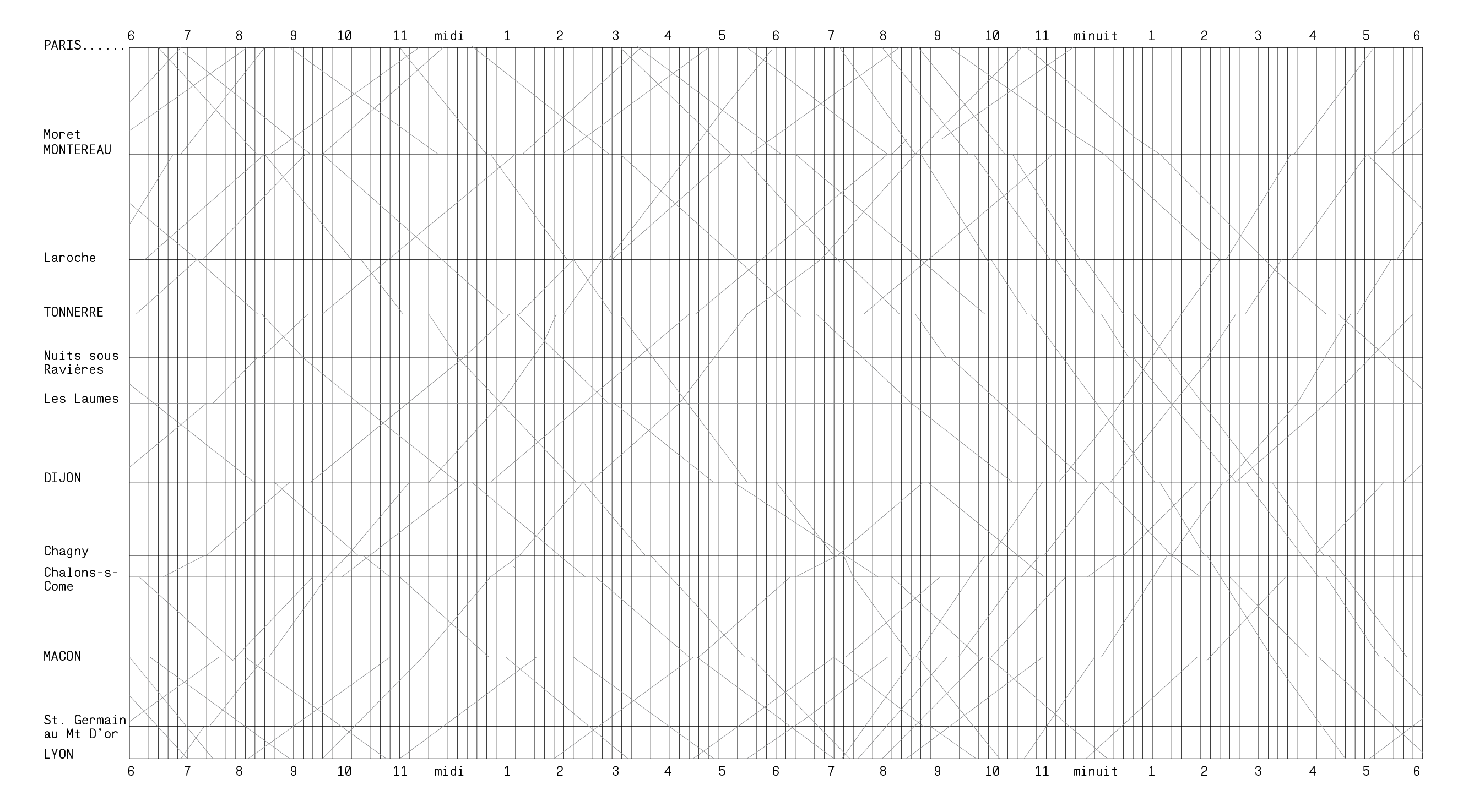
Timetable depicting schedules from Paris to Lyon

== Scheduling ==
In many modern public transport systems, timetables and rostering are generated by computer, with the operators specifying the required operating span, minimum frequencies, route length/time and other such factors. Design of the schedule may aim to make times memorable for passengers, through the use of clock-face scheduling — services departing at regular intervals, at the same times every hour. This is less likely to apply at peak times, when the priority is optimum utilisation of available vehicles and staff.

=== Headway services ===
In large cities services may be so frequent that consulting a timetable is unnecessary. In some cases public transport operators do not publish public timetables for busy times of day, or they may simply state "services run every 3–5 minutes" (or words to that effect), which is the norm for buses in some cities such as Hong Kong even during off-peak hours.

== Gallery ==
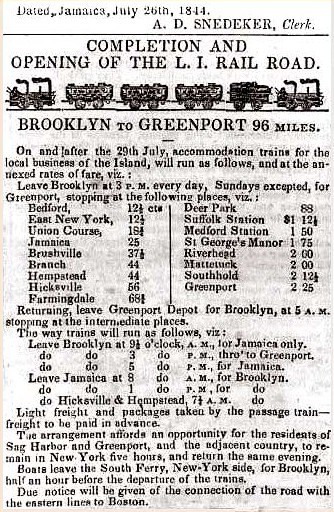
An 1844 timetable for the Long Island Rail Road

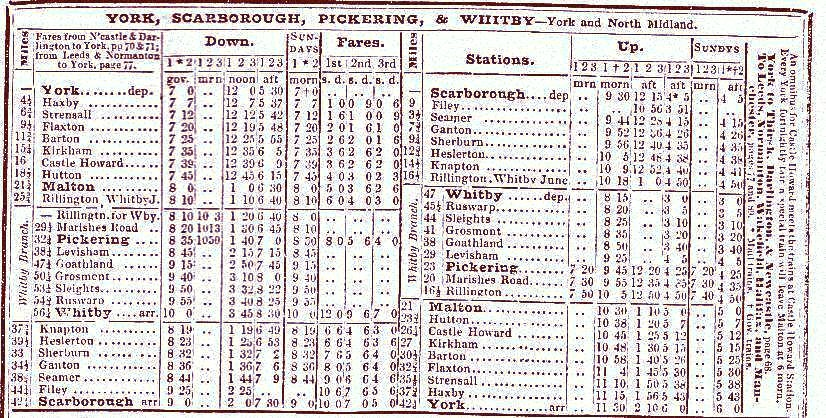
Bradshaw's railway timetable

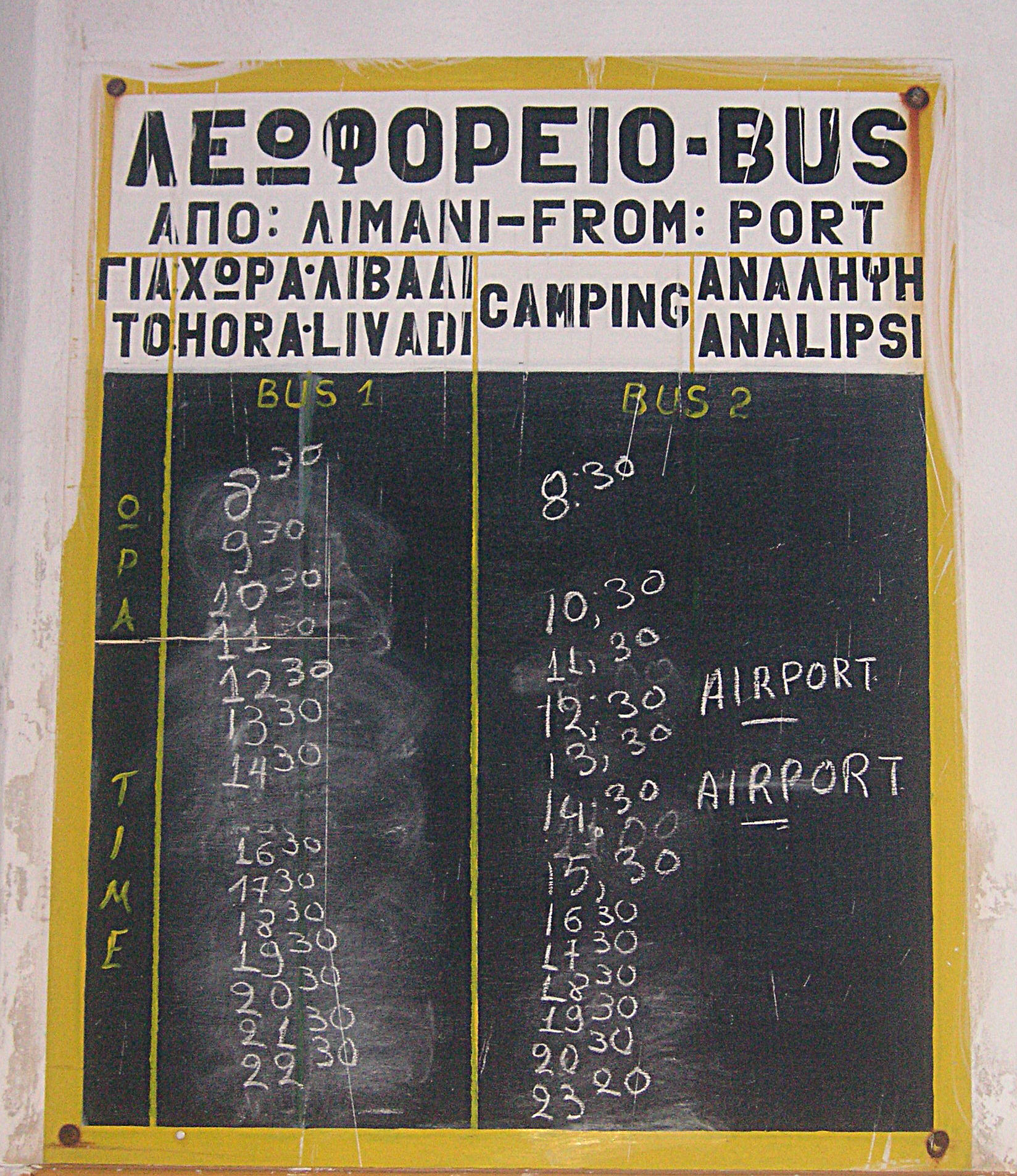
A simple bus timetable (2005) on the Greek island of Astipalea

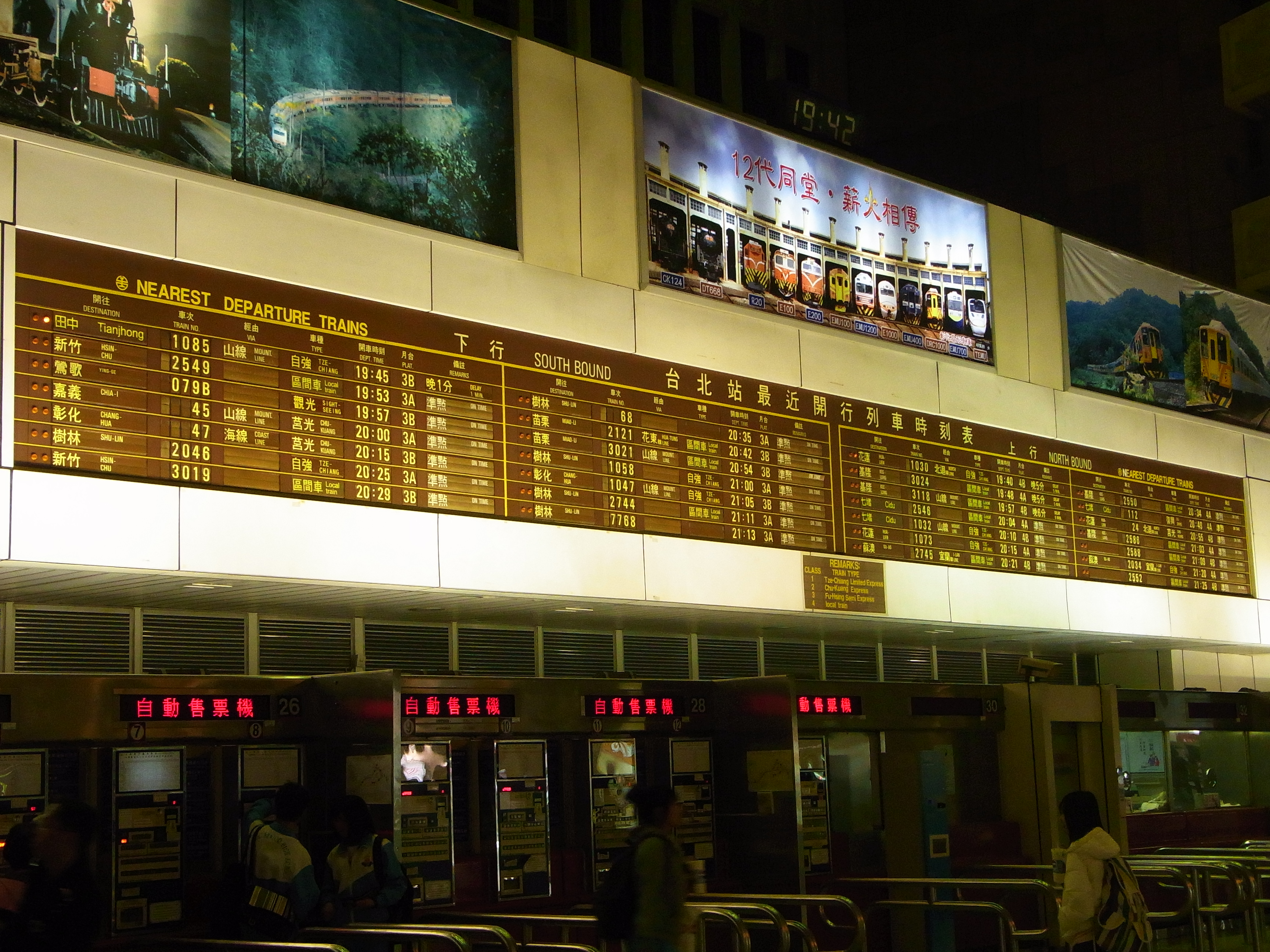
A flap display in Taipei Station, Taiwan

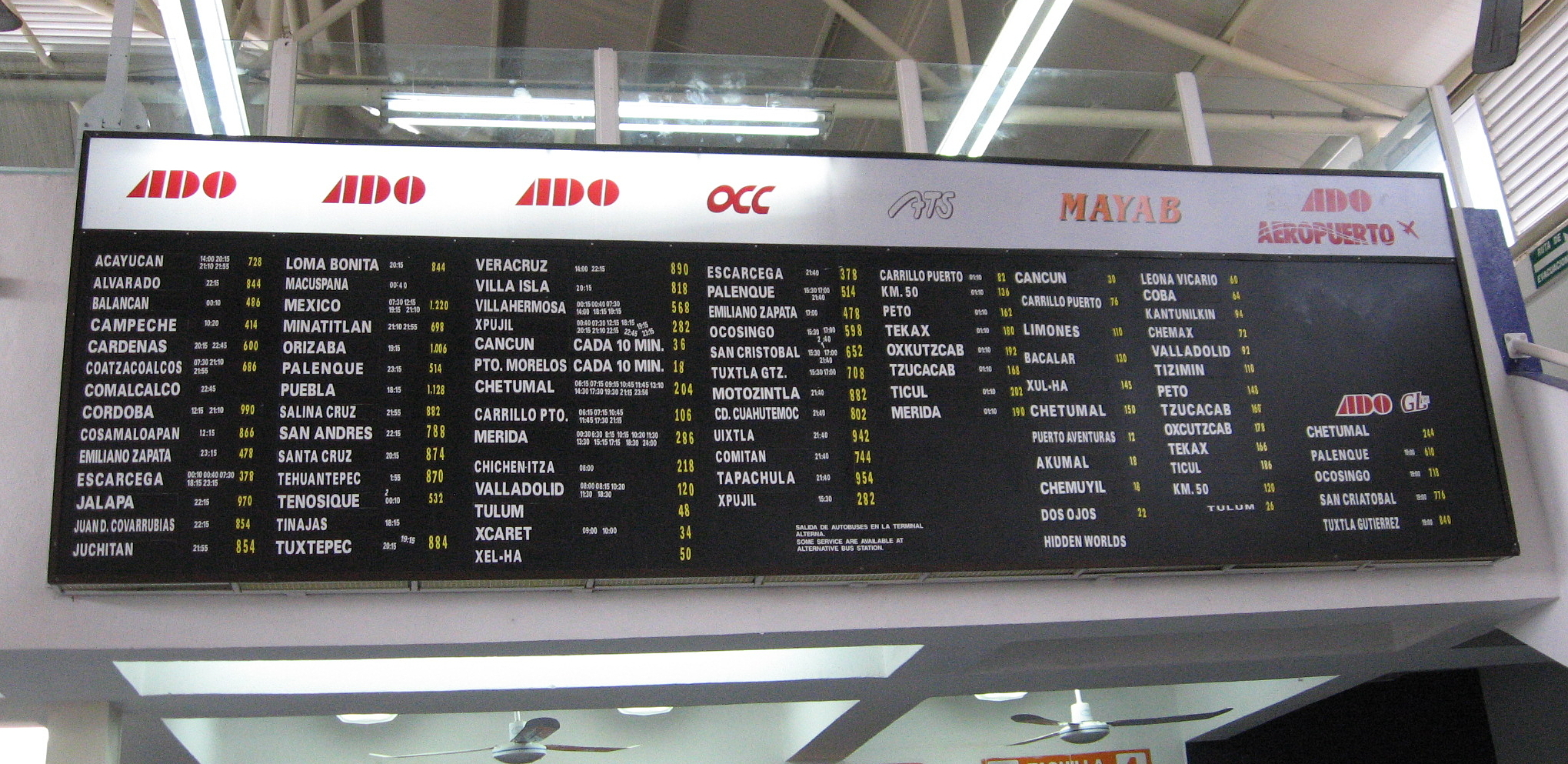
Times and prices on printed display, Playa del Carmen, Mexico

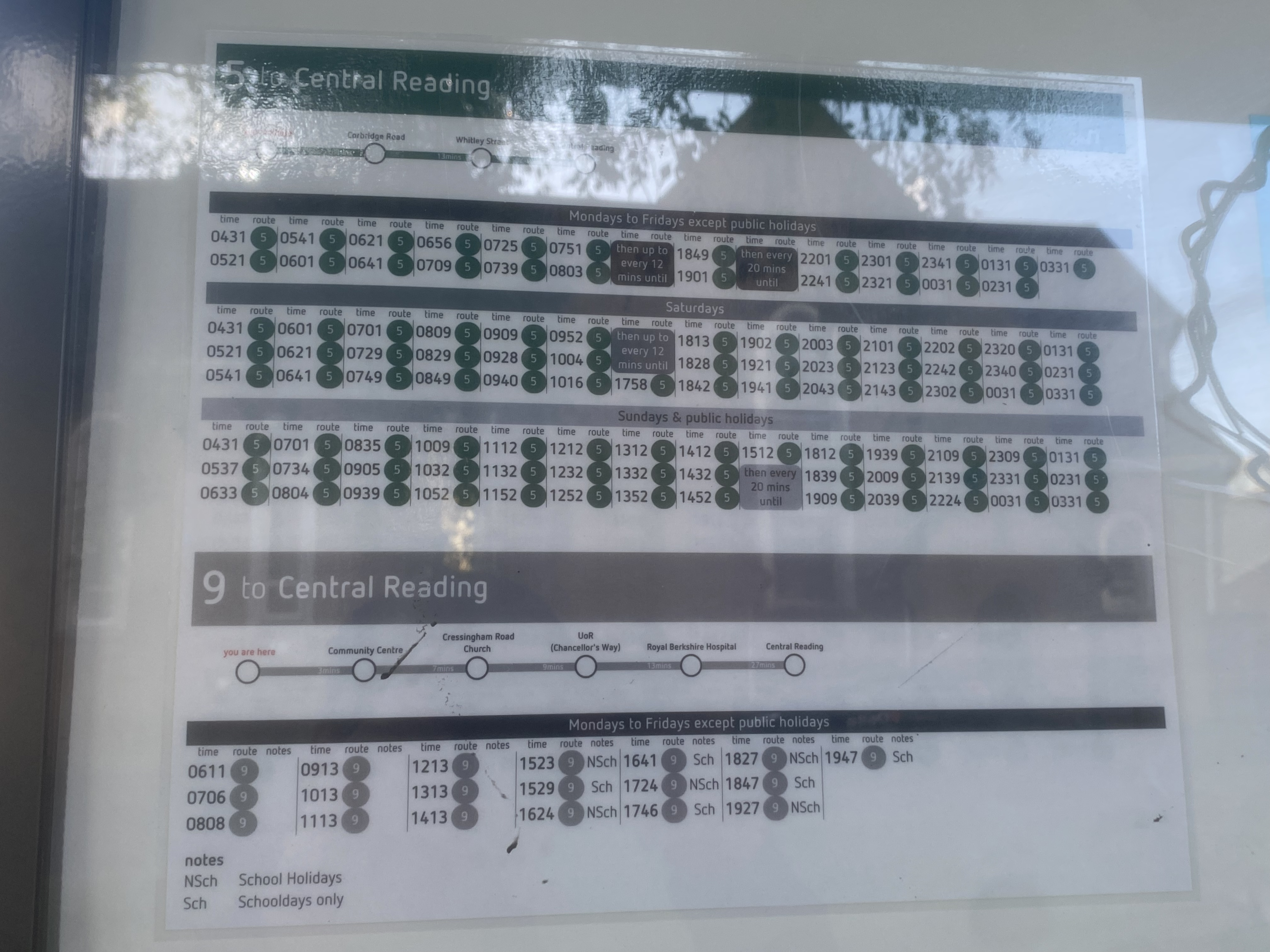
A modern stop-specific bus timetable in Reading, United Kingdom

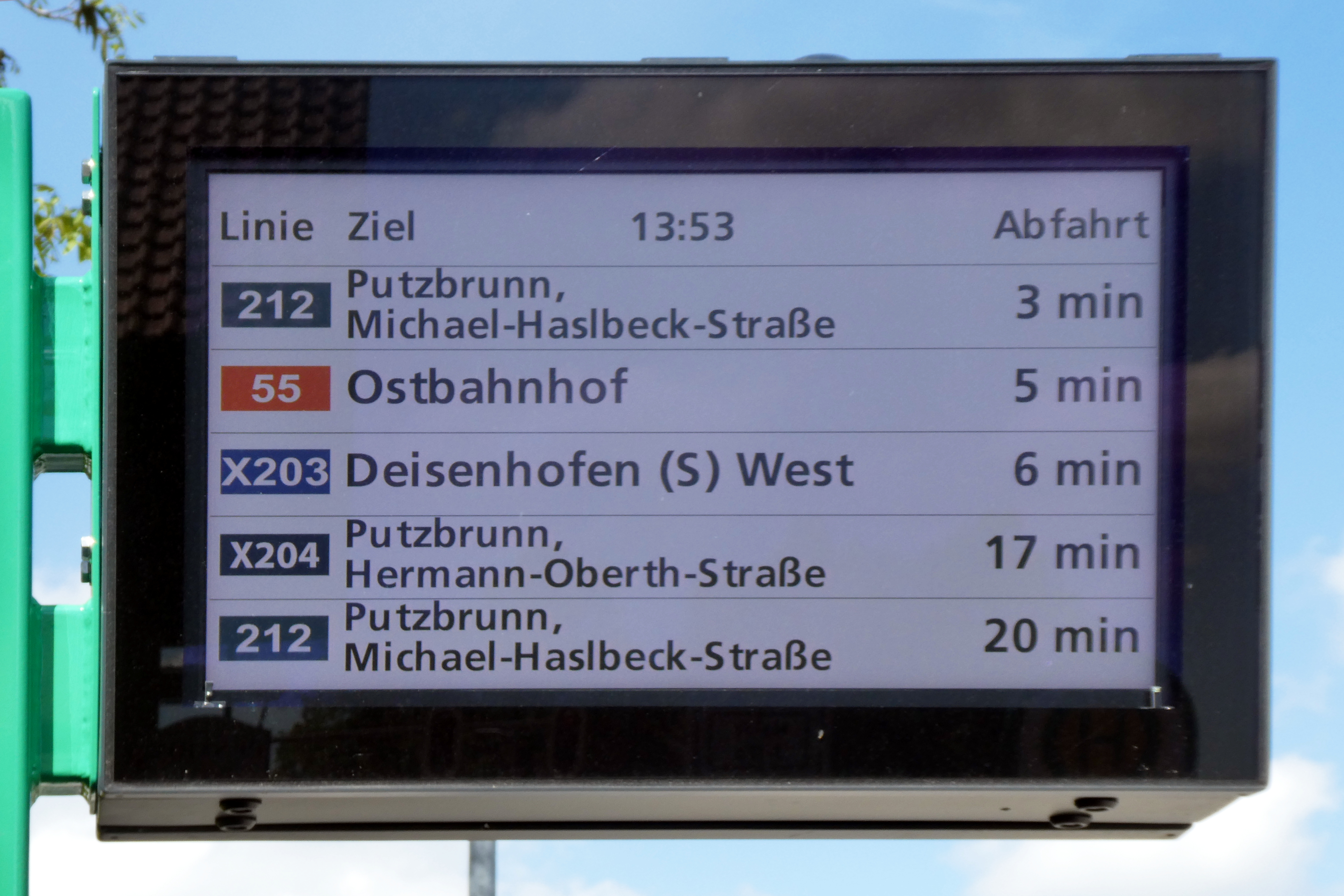
An electronic bus timetable in Germany

== International timetables ==
- European Rail Timetable, formerly titled Thomas Cook European Timetable

A monthly timetable book of major trains, some bus and ferry services in Europe.

- Thomas Cook Overseas Timetable

A bi-monthly timetable book of major trains, and some bus and ferry services outside Europe, ceased December 2010.

- OAG Flight Guide

A monthly air timetable book published by OAG (Official Airline Guide), and covers all airlines and airports in the world.

== National timetables ==
=== America ===
==== United States ====
- Amtrak System Timetable

The official timetable book, published twice a year.

=== Asia ===
==== China ====
- China Railway Passenger Train Timetable (全国铁路旅客列车时刻表)
- China Railway Passenger Express Train Timetable (全国铁路旅客快车时刻表)

Published twice a year by China Railway Publishing, in Chinese. The former timetable includes all trains, the latter fast express trains only.

- Chinese Railway Timetable

Published irregularly (last January 2015) by Duncan Peattie, in English. It includes all trains shown in the Chinese Railway Passenger Train Timetable, but not all stations.

==== India ====
- Trains at a Glance

Published once a year in English and Hindi.

==== Japan ====
The first regularly published timetable (Japanese: 時刻表, Hepburn: jikokuhyō) appeared in 1894, published by a private company. By the time of the nationalization of Japanese railways in 1906, three competing timetables were being published and it was decided that only one official timetable should be offered to the public. Five thousand copies of the first official timetable were published in January 1915.

In 2010, two printed national timetables were available; one published by JTB Corporation and one published by the Transportation News Company/Kotsu Shimbunsha, itself owned by all constituent companies of the Japan Railways Group (barring the RTRI) and SoftBank. These thick books - the February 2009 edition of the JTB timetable, for example, contains 1152 pages - are published every month and cover all stations and trains of JR and private railways, as well as long-distance bus, ferry and air services. For frequent JR urban lines, subway trains, private railways and urban buses, only summary timetables are shown. In 2009, a book was published to mark the 1000th edition of the JTB timetable, containing reproductions of all one thousand covers, selected timetables and maps, and articles on the way the timetable is produced.

There are also many searchable online timetables covering all forms of transport, for example http://www.hyperdia.com/. Timetables for PDAs, mobile phones and PCs are readily available.

==== South Korea ====
- Tourism Transport Timetable (월간 관광교통 시각표)

Published every month and covers all trains, highway bus, ferry and domestic air services.

=== Europe ===
Every year, in December and June, some European train timetables are amended. There are seldom major changes to important routes, but the change allows for alterations to international services and for seasonal variation. In the months leading up to the changeover date booking will be restricted as some railway operators are sometimes late loading in the new data (between several weeks and a few days before the change).

In Switzerland timetable changes only happen once a year in December. In Switzerland major changes happen only in odd years.

One of the most comprehensive European-wide timetable information is provided by the electronic timetable search engine of German Railways Deutsche Bahn (information is also available in Danish, Dutch, French, Italian, Polish, Spanish and Turkish). The same information, but differently presented, one also find on the online timetables by the Swiss Federal Railways (in English, German, French, and Italian) and the timetable by the Czech Ministry of Transport (in Czech, and - however not to every detail - in English and German).

==== Germany ====
- Ihr Reiseplan

This is a free timetable leaflet distributed in express train and has information about the departure, arrival time of the train and connecting services. For many years the “Kursbuch Gesamtausgabe” ("complete timetable"), a very thick timetable book, was published but its contents are now available on the Deutsche Bahn website and CD ROM.

==== Italy ====
- Pozzorario generale

Covers most trains.

==== Switzerland ====
In Switzerland, timetables change happens only once a year in December all over Switzerland for any kind of public transportation means; major changes even happens only every second year on odd years.

A large annual publication consisting of all Swiss railways, funiculairs, most lake and river boats, cableways, Swiss PostBus, and all other country buses timetables.

===== Official Timetable =====
- Official Timetable of Switzerland in one multi-lingual edition, while the particular timetables themselves are kept in the language of the respectively covered Swiss area.
- Information and Explanations (German, French, Italian, Rumantsch)
- The printed version (three volumes; city transit networks (buses and tramways) are only referenced, but not included) has been cancelled from season 2017/18 onwards. Therefore, only the synoptic map of the first volume is up-to-date:
  - Volume 1 for railways/funiculairs, cableways, and boats: synoptic map
  - Volumes 2 and 3 for buses in western and eastern Switzerland: synoptic map (only last version of 2017)

===== Coherent, integrated online timetables =====
All online timetables provide information for the same timetable as the printed Official Timetable plus all Swiss city transit systems and networks as well as most railways in Europe. The user interface as well as all Swiss railways stations, and bus, boat, cable car stops are transparently available in German, French, Italian, and English spelling.

- By Swiss Federal Railways (SBB CFF FFS):
  - SBB CFF FFS online
  - Printed Timetables: Departure/Arrival posters and pocket timetables as well as personal timetables of all SBB CFF FFS railway stations as PDF files.
  - Mobile Apps by SBB CFF FFS.
- By Swiss PostBus (PostAuto, CarPostal, AutoPostale):
  - Swiss PostBus online ... and Mobile App
  - Network routes

==== United Kingdom ====
- GB Rail Timetable

Published by The Stationery Office (the official UK Government publishers), and contains information, according to its title page, "with permission of Network Rail and obtained under licence the Rail Delivery Group. It closely resembles Network Rail's former timetable book, which ceased publication in 2007, but PDF timetable files are on its website.
It appears twice per year:

- In May, titled GB Rail Timetable Summer Edition lasting from May to December
- In December, titled GB Rail Timetable Winter Edition lasting from December to May

===== History =====
Until 1974 each region of British Rail published its own timetable. The first Great Britain timetable started on 4 May 1974. Prior to that the only joint publication between regions had been a publication of 30 principal passenger services from 1962, following the demise of Bradshaw in 1961. The final printed all-line timetable was produced by Network Rail in 2007, after which versions were published both by the Stationery Office and Middleton Press. Subsequently, The Stationery Office version has been discontinued and for the summer of 2016 Middleton Press only published a reprint of the UK pages of the European Rail Timetable, although a limited two-volume comprehensive version belatedly appeared in August.

== See also ==
- Clock-face scheduling
- Train station announcement
- Timing point
