= Thomas Cook's Rugby Club =

Defunct English amateur rugby union club, based in Ravensbourne, Kent

Thos. Cook & Son's RFC
- Founded: 1910
- Disbanded: 1966
- Location: Ravensbourne, Kent, England
- Ground: Ravensbourne Kent
- Chairman: (England) Sir John Elliot

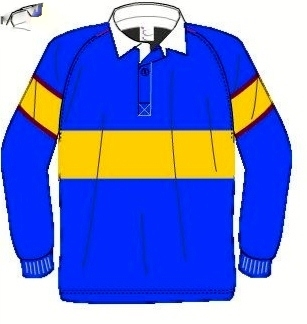
Club Jersey, Royal Blue, white collar, Gold hoop with brown key lines

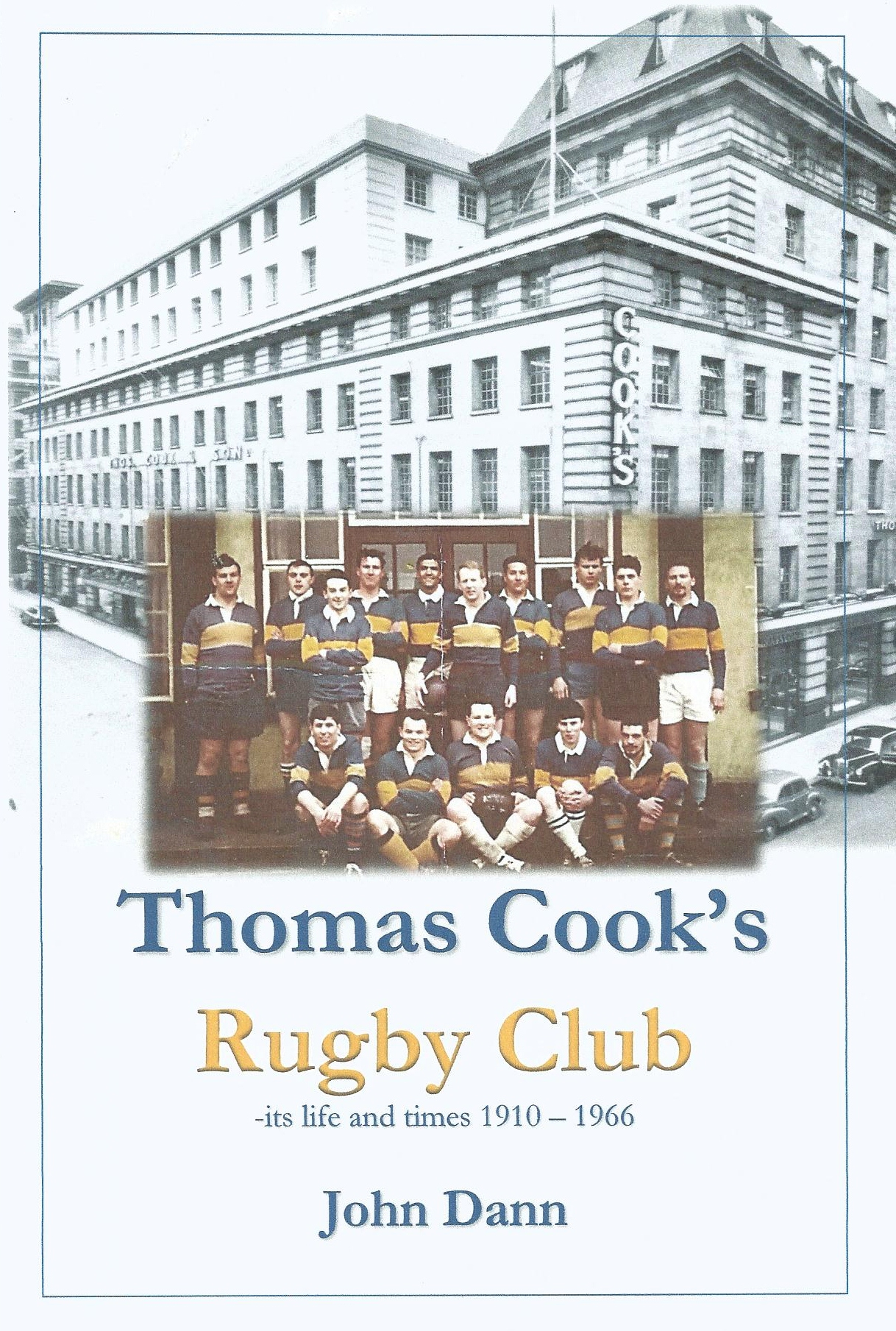
TCRFC Book Front Cover. Back Cover copy:" Four years after the Sports Club was formed – around the time of Edward VII’s Coronation, Thomas Cook was reckoned to be among the ‘three most competent organisations in the world’ the other two being the Roman Catholic Church and the Prussian Army."

Thomas Cook’s amateur Rugby Football Club was founded in 1910 as part of a wider sports club established by the company in 1897, with the ground at Ravensbourne in Kent.
The first club president was Frank Henry Cook (1862-1940 -eldest grandson of the company founder), who had played his rugby at Mill Hill School.
It ceased playing during both World Wars, and like many ‘house’ rugby clubs it no longer exists. At its most popular the club ran two XV's until it closed in 1966. During its lifetime the club played against well over 100 different clubs in London and the South East.
It also established a regular Easter tour to the Netherlands in 1958 playing RC Hilversum. which helped to promote Dutch rugby during the 1960s. The original tour fixture was filmed for Dutch cinemas and television in front of crowd of over 2,600 at the AGOVV Apeldoorn stadium in Apeldoorn.

== Thomas Cooks Sports Club ==
Established in 1897, initially known as the ‘Ludgate Circus Athletic Club’, (after the company's first London Head Office) when the existing football and swimming clubs amalgamated. The new club had four sections – football, swimming, cricket and tennis – and the playing facilities scattered across London. Despite having no ground, it proved popular and by 1902 the club was simply known as the ‘Ludgate Circus Club’. The company purchased land at Ravensbourne Kent and laid out a sports ground and erected a Pavilion. By 1905 it had become one of the finest private athletic grounds near London. By the summer of 1911 the sports club had over 600 members.

The rugby section was established in 1910 as the Ludgate Circus XV. After the First World War a new pavilion was built in 1922 opened by Thomas Cook's eldest grandson, the club's president Frank Henry Cook (1862-1931). The rugby club changed its name to Thos. Cook & Son's RFC in 1926 after the company moved to its new London Head Office in Berkeley Street Mayfair. During this time the annual summer Sports Day was held at Ravensbourne which became a popular date in the company's social calendar.

== Honours Cap recipients ==
Probably an incomplete list, this was an established award to players for distinguished performance, discontinued after Second World War.

Ludgate Circus XV
1923–4, Copson, A., Johns, A.C., Murrell, E.D., Trend, W.G. 1925–6, Coussens, R., Higgins, E.J.K.,

Thos. Cook & Son's RFC
1927–8, Dunworth, P.R., White, P.J.,

Formal Club Dinners
It had been a long established tradition in rugby circles to hold an end of season club dinner or supper. The only club record appears in August 1926 when the Grafton Hotel Tottenham Court Road, hosted the dinner. Coussens and Higgins were awarded their honour caps. Post war this dinner became less formal and often held in a pub.

== Club Ground ==
The club sports ground had been purchased and laid-out around 1903 and established in 1905, at Ravensbourne in Kent.
A new pavilion was built in 1922. In all internal communications the 'pavilion' was referred to as the 'club-house' by the rugby section.

Location: Ravensbourne Avenue, Beckenham, Kent Telephone: RAVensbourne 6713

Resident stewards: Annie & William Dyer (1953–56), George & Gladys Gladdy (1956–75)

After the company moved its Head Office to Peterborough in 1977, the club was renamed Thomas Cook Sports and Social Club. The Ravensbourne playing fields and pavilion were purchased by the Goan Association and used as a sports facility until tragically the old Mock-Tudor clubhouse opened by the founder's grandson seventy-six years earlier, was burnt down in 1998 due to vandalism. It was then sold to Lewisham Council – now called Summerhouse Playing Fields as part of the wider Beckenham Place Park open space.

During the war years (1939-1945) the ground was requisitioned by the army and the site used for anti-aircraft guns. Nearby at Crab Hill, a Prisoner of War Camp for Italians was established known as Summerhouse Camp 233, part of the Beckenham Place Park estate.

== Rugby Club Officials ==
First Club President
Frank Henry Cook (1862-1931) – Grandson of founder Thomas Cook (played his rugby at Mill Hill School)

Original Club officials
Ludgate Circus XV: Hon. Sec. R.G. Smithard 1911–2 season, Committee Chairman, N.M. Smith, 1925–6 season,
(renamed) Thos. Cook & Sons RFC: Hon. Sec. J.G.C. Perrett Young, 1926–7 season

Original founder club players
Little archive material survives, but records show: Bayliss, Biddell, Crawley, Foster, Landsberry, were amongst the original team players for the first season 1910–1911.

Post war Club Presidents
Stanley Adams, Chairman (1953–59)
Sir John Elliot (railway manager), Chairman (1959–67)

Affiliations
Rugby Football Union, Kent Rugby Football Union,
Kent Society of Rugby Football Union Referees

== Kit Supplier ==
The appointed supplier was the retailer Lillywhites of Picadilly Circus London.

== Club Captains ==
1910 - 1939
E.D. Murrell, 1923–4, W.G. Trend, 1925–6,

1953 - 1966
First XV Seasons 1953-1966'
Roy Dangerfield (1953–56); Don Keston (1956–58); Hugh Dalzell (1958–61); Mike Lidbetter (1961–62); Bob Maidment (1962–63); Dave Isaac (1963–64); Mike Lakin (1964–65); Jim Munnick (1965-66)

A XV Seasons 1958 - 1965
Dennis Beal (1958–59); Don Keston (1959–61); Derek Sells (1961–63); Mike Lakin (1963–64); Dave Keeling (1964–65);

== Fixture Opposition ==
1910 - 1914, 1921 - 1939
No fixture lists for these periods survive, with the exception of some details from the 1925–6 season. It records the club played 19 games, 10 won, 8 lost, with 1 drawn. It also records a match against Bart's Hospital (see Barts and the London RFC) in aid of the Hospital Comfort Fund, losing 0–3. It was noted that Bart's had won the United Hospitals Cup the previous season.

1953 - 1966
In the post war period - fixtures in the amateur game (before the formalized RFU league system introduced in 1987) was arranged by club fixture secretaries.
They would meet by custom on an 'ad hoc' basis once or twice a year in a London pub, The Phoenix, Cavendish Square, W1.

The following list of clubs played (many since closed) within London and Home Counties - shows an astonishing range and diversity - probably impossible today.

Major 19th c. established rugby clubs:
London Irish (1898), London Scottish F.C. (1878), Rosslyn Park F.C. (1879), Saracens F.C. (1876), Wasps RFC (1867)

Old Boys (ex Grammar School Clubs):
Abbotstonians, Anchorians, Askians, Beccehamians, Caterhamians, Cestrians, Colfeians, Creightonians, Dunstonians, Elthamians, Elysians, Esthameians, Hamptonians, Hermits, Isleworthians, Ignatians, Loughton, Masonians, Mitchamians, Purleians, Olavians, Shootershillians, Tottonians, Woolverstonians

Established minor clubs:
Brighton Football Club (RFU), Ealing, Esher, Grasshoppers, Hendon, Merton & Morden, Osterley, Rochester, Ruislip Shirley Wanderers, Sidcup, Streatham, Sudbury Court, Twickenham (Exiles), Wanstead, Westcombe Park, Wimbledon

Colleges, Polytechnics, Youth organisations:
Battersea College University of Surrey, Borough Polytechnic, Goldsmiths College Goldsmiths, University of London, King Edward VII Nautical College, Kingston Tech, Northern Poly, College of St Mark & St John, Southall Technical College, University Coll. London, Woolwich Poly, Centymca (Central YMCA), Fairbairn House (East-End Boys Club), Toch H

Military, Naval, Police:
Battersea Ironsides (ex.42nd Royal Tank Regiment Cadets XV), HAC (Hon Artillery Company) Artillery Ground, HMS President (London Div. RNR), Metropolitan Police, U.S. Marines ('wanderers XV' based at their London Embassy)

Insurance Companies:
Cuaco (Commercial Union Assurance Co.), Ibis (Prudential plc Assurance), Royal Exchange Assurance Corporation, Sun Alliance (company)

Government & Institutions:
BBC (British Broadcasting Corporation) Motspur Park, Civil Service, Customs & Excise, Foreign Office, London Fire Brigade, London Transport, National Coal Board (NCB), PLA (Port of London Authority), Vet Lab (Government Central Veterinary Laboratory),

Manufacturing & Business Houses:
AEC, AEI (Woolwich), CAV, Decca, Firestone, Ford, GEC, Harrodian (Harrod's Department Store Knightsbridge), Hoover, Lensbury (Shell), Lyons (J.Lyons & Co.), Meadhurst (British Petroleum), Unilever, Smiths Industries (Clocks), Siemens, Standard Telephones, V.C.D (Vickers)

Hospital Medical and Dental schools:
King's College Hospital, London Hospital, Royal Dental Hospital, Royal Free, University College Hospital

UK Banks & Foreign Exchange:
Bank of England, Barclays, Lloyds, National Provincial, Westminster, Forex (London Foreign Exchange)

Overseas Banks (London based):
Chartered Bank of India, Bank of London and South America, Bank of West Africa, Standard Bank of South Africa

Airlines, Travel Agencies:
Silver Wings (BEA-British European Airways), Speedbird (BOAC), Swans Tours

Railways:
Great Western Railways (GWR), London Midland Scottish Railway (LMS), Southern Railway (SR)

Exiles:
London French RFC, London New Zealand RFC

== Easter tours to the Netherlands ==
The club was amongst the first English clubs to tour the Netherlands with a match against RC Hilversum in 1958. It was such a 'novelty' that it was filmed by Polygoon Profilti - Polygoon (newsreel) as a newsreel for Dutch cinemas and television to promoting the game through the Netherlands, it was a great success. See film clip of first overseas tour to Holland 1958:
The first RC Hilversum overseas tour was to Ravensbourne in 1959, containing some Dutch Internationals, Feike (Frits) Frankfort, Jan Van Altena (107 caps) and Jan Rosman.

Other games were played against: RC 't Gooi, Naarden, ASRV_Ascrum, (Amsterdam Student Club), Delftsche Studenten Rugby Club (Delft Student Rugby Club)

Annual tour matches were played alternatively between the Netherlands and England until 1965.

Year - Venue - Tour Captain:
1958 - Netherlands - Don Keston (1923-2005)
1959 - England - Hugh Dalzell (1933- )
1960 - Netherlands - Hugh Dalzell
1961 - England - Hugh Dalzell
1962 - no fixture - Mike Lidbetter (1936- )
1963 - Netherlands - Bob Maidment
1964 - England - Dave Isaac (1938-1983), later Jim Munnick
1965 - Netherlands - Jim Munnick (-d.2015)

== Seven-a-side competitions ==
Between 1957 and 1964 the club took part in the end of season North Kent Sevens, Eastern Banks Sevens, and Business House Sevens

== Club closure ==
The club officially closed at the end of the 1965–66 season. In the summer of 1966 the official governing bodies were notified by Hon. Secretary Derek Bascombe (1929-2001).

== Club Reunions ==
2010 - The Clarence London W1
During book research for the club's history, a small band of 'old' players had been found and all agreed to attend the club's 100th anniversary in November 2010. The venue selected was The Clarence Pub in Dover Street, off Piccadilly in London. Once a watering-hole of TCRFC. Attending were Hugh Dalzell, Roy Butcher, John Dann, Roy Bannister (1928-2014), Robin Garrett (1935-2018).

2014 - Langan's Brasserie London W1
After the publication, further research found more 'old players' who agreed on a last reunion in September 2014. This time the legendary restaurant Langan's Brasserie in Mayfair was selected. Just around the corner from the old Cook's HQ in Berkeley Street. The group consisted of Brian Martin, Jim Munnick (-d.2015), Dale Tarrild-Ball, Bob and Jacky Gould, Harry (1940-2015) and Ann Masterton-Smith, John and Maggie Dann, Roy Butcher, Hugh Dalzell.

== See also ==
- Thomas Cook & Son
- Thomas Cook Group
