= Fiducial =

Fiducial may refer to:

- Fiduciary, in law, a person who holds a legal or ethical relationship of trust
- Fiducial inference, in statistics, a form of interval estimation
- "Fiducial line" or "fiducial edge" of an alidade, an instrument used to measure the angle to a distant object
- Fiducial marker or fiducial, an object or marking placed in an image for use as a point of reference
- Reference point (disambiguation), or origin of a frame of reference

== In particle physics ==
- Fiducial cross section, in particle physics experiments, a cross section for the subset of a process in which the distinctive process signatures are visible within the sensitive regions of the detector volume. The definition now commonly means a cross section with kinematic and other selection cuts consistent with the sensitive detector acceptance applied, but in which detector inefficiencies are corrected for within that volume. These corrections are typically derived by applying the fiducial cuts on collections of simulated collision events, with and without detector simulation, and inverting the resulting detector transfer function. Fiducial cross sections are favoured for many purposes because they minimise extrapolation into experimentally invisible phase space, and are hence maximally model-independent.
- Fiducial volume, in low-background physics experiments, an inner volume of particle detector media in which background events are largely excluded
