= Agricultural Act of 1948 =

United States legislation

- Long title: An Act to authorize the Secretary of Agriculture to stabilize prices of agricultural commodities; to amend section 22 of the Agricultural Adjustment Act, reenacted by the Agricultural Marketing Agreement Act of 1937; and for other purposes.
- Enacted by: the 80th United States Congress
- Effective: July 3, 1948

Citations
- Public law: Pub. L. 80–897
- Statutes at Large: 62 Stat. 1247

Codification
- Titles amended: 7 U.S.C.: Agriculture
- U.S.C. sections amended: Chapter 35 § 1281

Legislative history
- Introduced in the House as H.R. 6248; Signed into law by President Harry S. Truman on July 3, 1948

The Agricultural Act of 1948 (Pub.L. 80-897, 62 Stat. 1247) was enacted by the United States Congress and signed into law by President Harry S. Truman on July 3, 1948. The legislation revised and authorized several aspects of U.S. agricultural policy and agricultural subsidies.

== Summary ==
The Agricultural Act of 1948 enacted several agricultural policy reforms, including mandatory price supports for basic commodities at 90% of parity. It also mandated that in 1950, parity would begin to incorporate price averages of the previous ten years and the 1910-14 base period. The legislation also amended several provisions of the previously passed Agricultural Adjustment Act of 1938 (Pub.L. 75-430, 52 Stat. 31), including price support and marketing quotas for corn, wheat, cotton, rice and tobacco. Title I of the law, which pertained to price stabilization, took effect immediately while Title II, which amended the Agricultural Adjustment Act of 1938, and Title III, which contained various miscellaneous provisions, both took effect on January 1, 1950.
