= Refer =

Refer or referral may refer to:

- Reference, a relation of designation or linking between objects
  - Word-sense disambiguation, when a single term may refer to multiple meanings
- Referral marketing, to personally recommend, endorse, and pass a person to a qualified professional or service
- Referral (medicine), to transfer a patient's care from one clinician to another
- Commit (motion), a motion in parliamentary procedure
- Refer (software), the tr-off preprocessor for citations
- Rede Ferroviária Nacional, the Portuguese rail network manager
- Referral, a form of instant replay in cricket
- Criminal referral, a document recommending investigation of crimes to the appropriate authority
- HTTP referer, the address of the webpage of the resource which links to an internet webpage or resource

== See also ==
- Referee (disambiguation)
- Reference (disambiguation)
- Referent
- Reefer (disambiguation)
