= Airline timetable =

Document giving details of flights

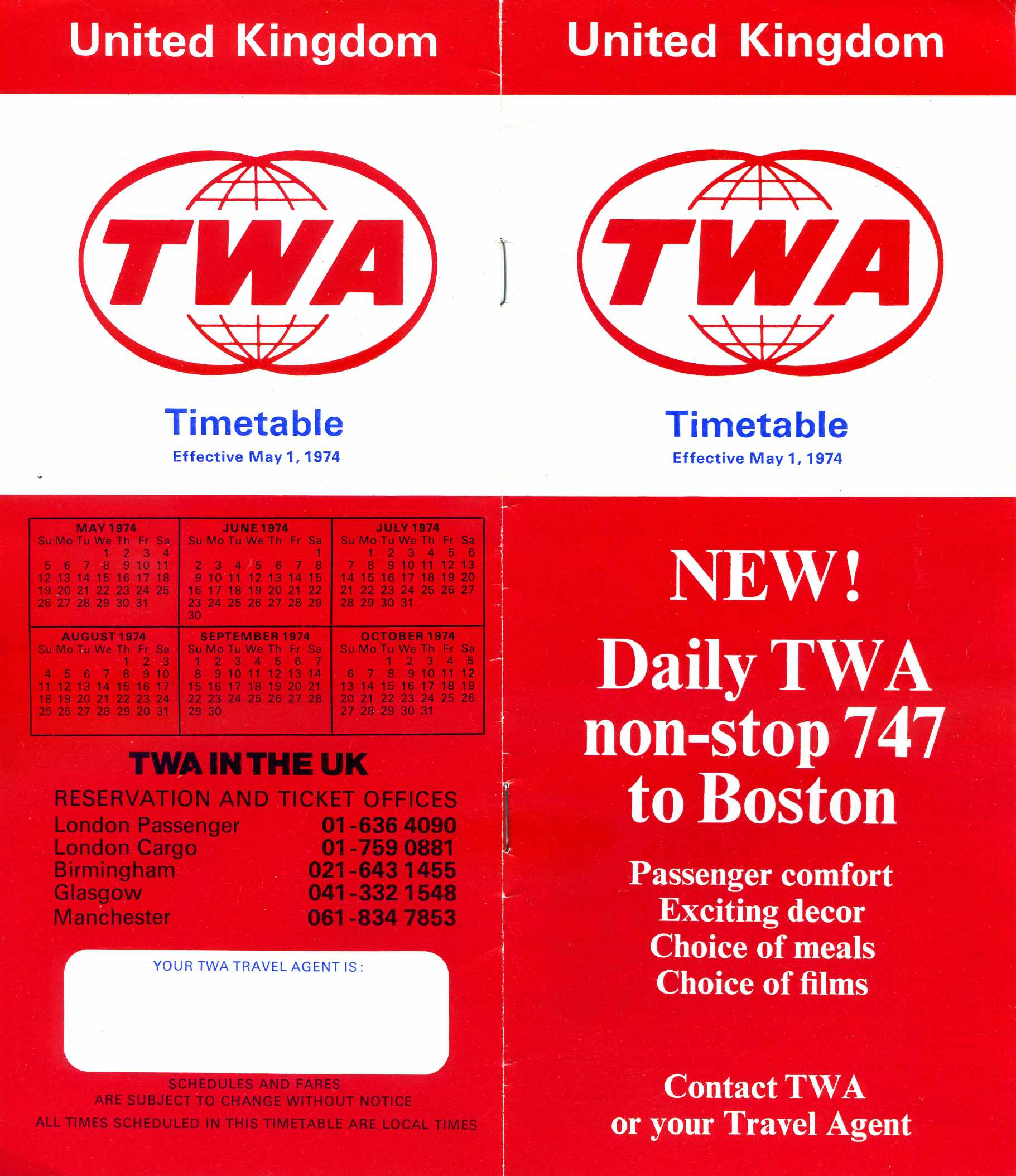
Back (left side) and front covers of a Trans World Airlines 1974 timetable

Airline timetables are printed pamphlets or folders that many airlines have traditionally used to inform passengers of several different things, such as schedules, fleet, security, in-flight entertainment, food menus, baggage weight restrictions, and contact information.

Airline timetables used to be printed, multi-page pamphlets available at airport counters, or upon request by phone or mail. On January 16, 1928, Pan Am published one of their first timetables. It read The air-way to Havana, Pan American Airways, Pershing Square Building, New York.

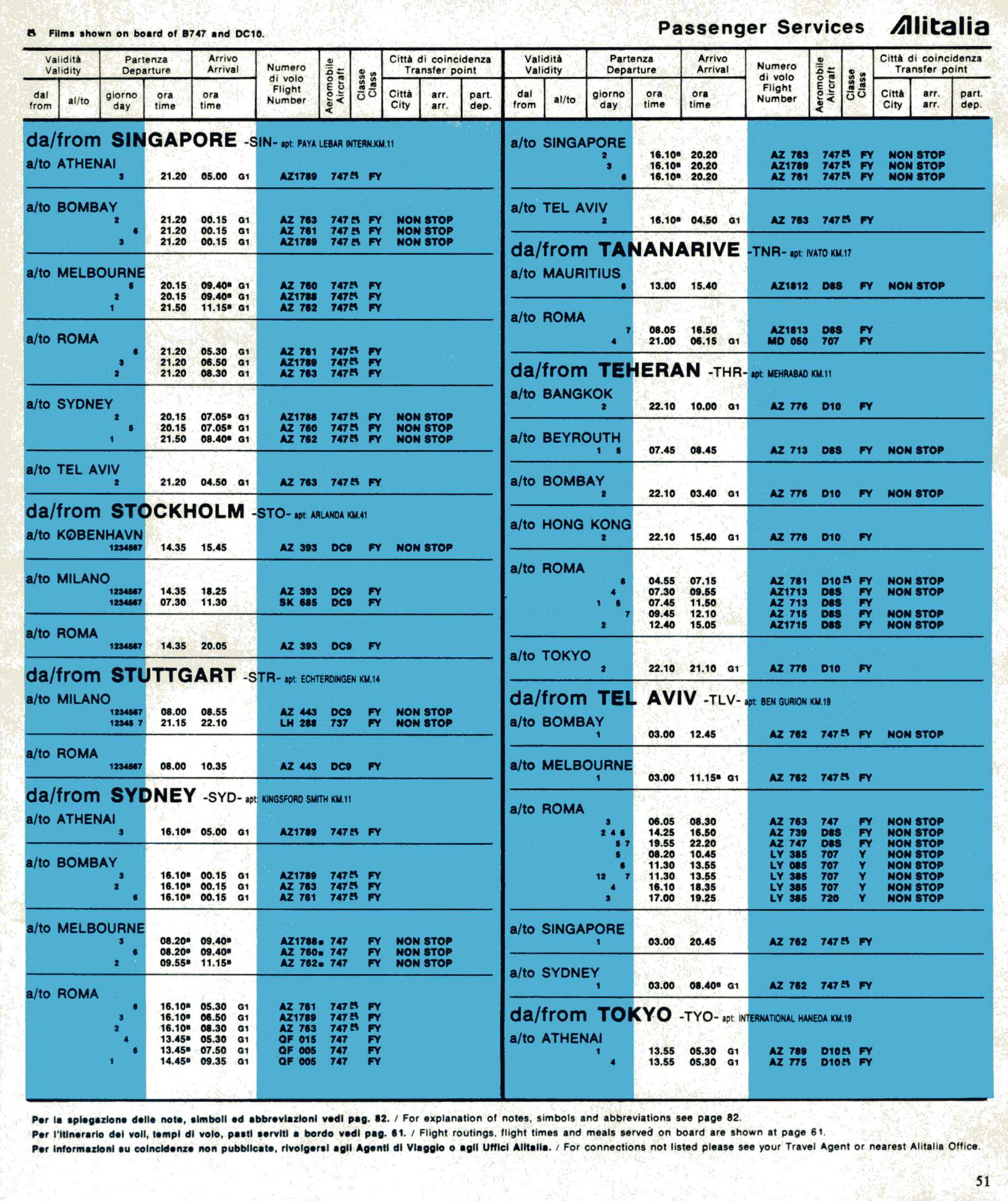
The inside of an Alitalia Airlines timetable from 1978

Many airline timetables had colorful covers. The timetables of very small airlines, such as Scenic Airways, consisted of one sheet of paper, with their hub's flight time information on the front, and the return times on the back.

In recent years, most airlines have stopped production of printed timetables, in order to cut costs and reduce the delay between a change of schedule and a new timetable being in the hands of the public. As a consequence, most airlines now post their timetables only online (the larger airlines often offering a stand-alone application, while others provide just a downloadable document such as a PDF), and the value of many printed airline timetable has risen among collectors.

== See also ==
- Public transport timetable
