= Thomas Cook European Timetable =

Timetable of passenger rail services in countries of Europe

- Cover in 1993; elements of this version were in the cover design from 1988 to 2004
- Editor: Chris Woodcock
- Former editors: Brendan H. Fox (1985–2013); J. H. Price (1952–85), et al.
- Categories: Travel reference; passenger rail transport
- Frequency: Monthly
- Circulation: 20,000 (as of 1977)
- First issue: March 1873 (as Cook's Continental Time Tables)
- Company: European Rail Timetable Ltd (2014–); Thomas Cook Publishing (and predecessor Thomas Cook & Son), 1873–2013
- Country: England
- Based in: Nottingham
- Language: English, with 4-page introduction in four other languages
- Website: European Rail Timetable
- ISSN: 1748-0817

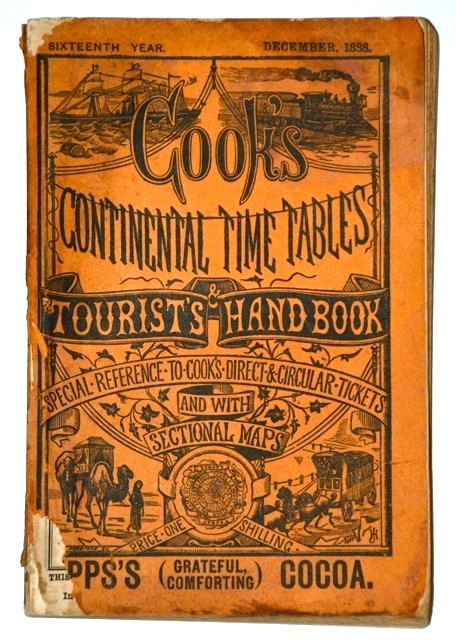
Cover of the December 1888 edition

The European Rail Timetable, more commonly known by its former names, the Thomas Cook European Timetable, the Thomas Cook Continental Timetable or simply Cook's Timetable, is an international timetable of selected passenger rail schedules for every country in Europe, along with a small amount of such content from areas outside Europe. It also includes regularly scheduled passenger shipping services and a few coach services on routes where rail services are not operated. Except during World War II and a six-month period in 2013–14, it has been in continuous publication since 1873. Until 2013 it was published by Thomas Cook Publishing in England, and since 1883 has been issued monthly.

In 2013, Thomas Cook discontinued publication of the Timetable, in accordance with a decision to close the company's publishing business altogether, and the final Thomas Cook edition was published in August 2013, ending a 140-year run. However, within a few months a new company, European Rail Timetable Limited, was formed to take over publication of the Timetable. The first issue compiled by the new company was published in March 2014, with the publication title now being European Rail Timetable. In 2016 digital editions were introduced, and the number of printed editions per year was reduced from 12 to 6, but with digital issues thereafter being published monthly. In early 2025, the number of printed editions per year was further reduced, to just two – in January and June each year (named the Winter and Summer editions) – while digital editions continued to be published every month.

The Timetable has been recommended by several editors of travel guide books for Europe, one of whom described it as "the most revered and accurate railway reference in existence".

== History and overview ==
The idea that Thomas Cook & Son should publish a compendium of railway and steamship timetables for continental Europe was proposed by Cook employee John Bredall and approved by John Mason Cook, son of company founder Thomas Cook. The first issue was published in March 1873, under the title Cook's Continental Time Tables & Tourist's Handbook. The first editor, part-time only, was John Bredall. The title was later altered to Cook's Continental Time Tables, Tourist's Handbook and Steamship Tables. Publication was quarterly until the beginning of 1883, and monthly thereafter. Except for a break during World War II, publication has continued to be monthly ever since 1883. The Timetable has only had seven editors-in-chief in its history. John Bredall was followed in 1914 by C. H. Davies. Later editors were H. V. Francis (1946–52), John H. Price (1952–85, then Managing Editor until 1988), Brendan H. Fox (1985–2013), John Potter (2014–2024), and Chris Woodcock (since 2025). So as to remain sufficiently compact that it can be easily carried by a railway traveller, the Timetable does not show every scheduled train, every line and every station for each country, but shows all major lines and most minor lines. It has always been a softcover book.

World War I did not interrupt publication, but emphasis during the war was shifted more to shipping services, the result of disruption of rail service in several countries. During World War II, however, the timetable's publication was suspended, the last prewar issue being that of August 1939. Publication resumed in 1946. June 2011 marked the 1500th edition.

Cook's chief competitor, Bradshaw's Continental Railway Guide, also ceased publication in 1939, but did not resume after the war (A Bradshaw Guide covering just the United Kingdom survived until 1961). This improved the potential for significant increase in sales of the Cook's Timetable in the postwar period, and Thomas Cook began to offer it in the form of a monthly subscription, in addition to selling individual copies.

== Title changes ==
Although minor changes to the publication's title have been made over the years, every version included "Continental", rather than "European", from 1873 to 1987 — except for a brief period (1977–1980) when the coverage was expanded to worldwide and the name became the Thomas Cook International Timetable. The longstanding inclusion of "Continental" in the title reflected the fact that coverage was, for many years, mostly limited to continental Europe. From 1981, most non-European content was moved into a new publication named the Thomas Cook Overseas Timetable. "Rail" was added to the title only relatively recently, in 2005, making it the Thomas Cook European Rail Timetable, but its coverage continued to include some non-rail content, such as passenger shipping and ferry timetables.

From January 1919, the title was altered slightly, to Cook's Continental Time-Table. The apostrophe was dropped in 1956, and "time-table" also became one word. Subsequent name changes were made as follows:

- Thomas Cook Continental Timetable, mid-1974 through 1976
- Thomas Cook International Timetable (ISSN 0141-2701), 1977–80
- Thomas Cook Continental Timetable, (ISSN 0144-7467), 1981–87
- Thomas Cook European Timetable (ISSN 0952-620X), 1988–2004
- Thomas Cook European Rail Timetable (ISSN unchanged), 2005–13
- European Rail Timetable (ISSN 1748-0817 until 2021), 2014–

The "International" name was short-lived, as the non-European content that had prompted the adoption of that name was moved into a new publication at the beginning of 1981, the Thomas Cook Overseas Timetable (ISSN 0144-7475).

The Continental Timetable became the European Timetable in January 1988. Although "Rail" was added to the title in 2005, the Timetable continues to include principal passenger shipping services and a few coach (intercity bus) services, as before, and its ISSN did not change in 2005.

== Content and format changes ==
Coverage of the United Kingdom was originally very limited, and in the period 1954–70 it was excluded altogether. Bradshaw's Railway Guide had been publishing railway timetables for Britain since 1839, and continued to do so until 1961. British Rail was publishing its own timetable book, so even after Bradshaw's ceased publication, Cook's Timetable continued to cover only the continent. However, by the end of that decade Thomas Cook Publishing had decided it would be worthwhile to include in its Timetable a section covering the principal British services, and 64 pages of tables were added for this purpose in 1970.

Following the example of some of the national railway companies on the continent (starting with Italy in 1898), the use of a 24-hour clock for train arrival and departure times was adopted by Cook's Timetable in December 1919. It was the first timetable book in Britain to adopt this practice.

Although railway timetables have always been its predominant content, the Cook's Timetable included a substantial amount of other information during the first decades of the 20th century. The August 1939 edition, for example, devoted 48 of its 520 pages to general travel information, and regularly scheduled passenger shipping routes took 130 pages. In later decades, content other than railway timetables has continued to be included, but on a smaller scale. Shipping services consumed only about 30–35 pages in 1963 and general travel information consumed about 15–20 pages after the post-war resumption of publication.

Several Continental/European Timetable covers, along with one Overseas Timetable cover. A graphic of a 24-hour clock was part of the cover design from December 1919 through 1975. The final Thomas Cook iteration is at lower right.

A longstanding regular inclusion was a section giving passport and visa requirements for each European country, as applicable to travellers from different countries, taking about 4–8 pages. Other longtime regular features included a summary of baggage and customs regulations for each country, information on foreign currencies and a table giving the annual rainfall and average monthly high and low temperatures for each of about 150–200 European cities. Some of these features, although included in the Timetable for more than a century, were scaled-back in the 1990s or 2000s, after such information became available in greater detail on the Internet, or because of the simplification of border control and currencies under the European Union. Added in about 1990 was a brief, five-language glossary of words often used by railway travellers. A one-page list of scenic rail routes is another regular inclusion. Included since at least 1949 is a multi-page section with small maps of several cities that have more than one station, showing the locations of the principal rail lines and stations — and also showing metro or tram lines connecting stations, where available, to help travellers who need to go between stations to continue their journeys. The number of cities covered by this section has varied over time, between about 30 and 60.

Among the changes implemented in the immediate post-war period was that timetables were numbered, by route. Previously, tables had been simply headed by the names of the major cities served by the route. Numbering of timetables is a common practice now. Initially, the maps for each country or region remained unaltered, not showing the timetable numbers. This changed with the issue of 23 May 1954, which introduced a set of 15 new "index maps" – in place of 10 maps previously included – all drawn in a new style, showing only the railway lines covered by the Timetable and with individual timetable numbers marked for each line on the maps.

Sections in which timetables for certain types of long-distance services are grouped are another longtime regular feature, with a section on "car–sleeper trains" and one covering major named international trains. After the launch of the Trans-Europe Express (TEE) network, a section covering just TEE trains was added, designated Table 10, and this table was changed to a EuroCity table when ECs replaced most of the then-remaining TEE services at the start of the railways' summer timetable period on 31 May 1987.

The February through May editions include a section, at the back of the issue, giving planned schedules for the forthcoming summer timetable period on main international routes, for the benefit of persons doing advance planning of a summer travel itinerary, subject to the railway companies of the various countries providing the information sufficiently far enough ahead of time for this "supplement". Similarly, the October and November editions include a supplement showing the planned winter schedules on major routes, for the railway operators' winter timetable period. This practice of including advance summer and winter supplements in Cook's Timetable in the 2–3 months before those seasonal changes took effect started in 1958.

Around 1970, listings began to use local place-name spellings instead of anglicised versions for some – but not yet all – cities for which an English spelling existed. For example, the Hague became Den Haag, and Munich became München. This change was made in steps, not all at once. It was applied to all Italian cities, such as Firenze and Napoli, with effect from the 26 May 1974 edition. By mid-1975 the transition to local place-name spellings throughout the book had been completed. Distances between stations, shown in each route's timetable, were expressed in miles until the 1970s, but were changed to kilometres in 1976.

The Timetable's page size from 1873–1939 was 123 by 184 millimetres (4.8 in × 7.2 in), but was increased to 152 by 249 millimetres (6.0 in × 9.8 in) with the post-war resumption, and there have been only small changes to this subsequently. The Timetable currently measures 154 by 242 millimetres (6 in × 10 in). The number of pages per issue varies from issue to issue, mainly seasonally, and has varied over time. From the 1930s to the early 1990s the size of one issue usually varied between about 400 and 520 pages, while since the mid-1990s it has varied between about 560 and 600 pages.

For more than 136 years the cover of the Cooks Continental (or European) Timetable was orange (or red-orange) in colour, but with effect from the October 2009 issue it was changed to blue, matching the colour used for Thomas Cook's Overseas Timetable, in publication since 1981. When publication was taken over by a new publisher in 2014, what is now the European Rail Timetable returned to using red-orange for the cover colour.

In some years, a portion of the cover space was sold for an advertisement, including from the 1940s through 1975 and from 1998 through 2004. Since 2005, the cover does not carry advertising and, in the final years of publication by Thomas Cook, instead featured a monochrome photograph – changed with each issue – of a train of one of the railways of Europe.

In 2013, the European Timetable started to include a Route of the Month article in each monthly edition; it features narrative travel writing describing a particular European rail journey, usually with cross-reference to particular table numbers in the timetable section of the book. The legacy publication, independently published since March 2014 and now titled European Rail Timetable, continues to carry a Route of the Month in every issue. From early 2015, the Route of the Month was complemented by a second piece of narrative writing in every issue; this additional feature gives tips of travel planning and ticketing and runs under the title Tip of the Month.

== Non-European coverage ==
Although coverage was mainly limited to continental Europe, by at least the 1960s a few pages were devoted to major routes in other areas, mostly adjacent to Europe. For example, in the February 1967 issue, 16 of its total of 440 pages were given to railway timetables for "the USSR and Far East", Turkey, and all countries in the Middle East and North Africa that had any scheduled train service. Non-European coverage was expanded in the 1970s. Schedules for Amtrak, in the United States, were added in 1972, after Amtrak hired Thomas Cook & Son Ltd. as a sales agent and paid to have its schedules included in the Timetable. By 1974, Canadian National's service had also been added. However, altogether, the US and Canadian section still took up only 10 pages in a 520-page book.

A more substantial change was implemented early in 1977, when coverage was expanded to world-wide, and the title was changed from the Thomas Cook Continental Timetable to the Thomas Cook International Timetable. The new information for non-European countries was much more condensed than that for Europe, but the change still added 80 pages to the publication. The monthly print run exceeded 20,000 in summer 1977.

In January 1981, the non-European content was taken back out, to be included instead in a new bi-monthly publication entitled the Thomas Cook Overseas Timetable (ISSN 0144-7475), which averaged about 420 pages and included many more coach services, in countries where intercity rail service was very limited or non-existent. With this change, the main timetable book reverted to the name Thomas Cook Continental Timetable. The Overseas Timetable was published for 30 years, but ceased publication at the end of 2010.

Starting in the early 1990s, quarterly editions of the European Timetable have also been published, sub-titled the "Independent Traveller's Editions" and containing 32 additional pages of travel information. The frequency of these was later reduced to twice per year, for the summer and winter periods only. These editions are intended mainly for sale at book shops and each one is given a distinct ISBN, in addition to the ISSN of the series title. They have a full-colour photograph on the cover, as compared to the monochrome photo on the cover of the regular European Timetable.

In August 2011, about eight months after the Overseas Timetable ceased publication, a new section called "Beyond Europe" was added to the European Timetable. This section appears in every issue but rotates among six different regions of the world outside Europe, with each area being included only twice per year, six months apart.

== Foreign-language editions ==
Cover of the Autumn 2007 Japanese edition

A Japanese edition of the European Timetable was introduced in 1985, published twice a year (named the Spring and Summer editions) and printed by a different company, under a licensing agreement with Thomas Cook Publishing. The frequency later increased to quarterly but then reverted to bi-annually. The tables of train times were essentially unmodified, but the general-information sections and the introductory paragraphs at the start of each section were translated into Japanese. From 2000 to 2009, a monthly German-language edition was published, and this was produced directly by Thomas Cook Publishing – under an agreement with Deutsche Bahn (German Railways) and titled Kursbuch Europa. Unlike the Japanese version, this edition differed only slightly from the English version, with a brief German introduction and a different cover design.

== End of Thomas Cook era ==
On 1 July 2013, Thomas Cook announced that it would cease publishing the Timetable and all of its other publications, in accordance with a decision to close the company's publishing business altogether. The final Thomas Cook edition of the Timetable was published in August 2013. However, at the end of October it was announced that publication would resume, independent of Thomas Cook Group, in February 2014 as a result of agreements that had been reached allowing the formation of a new company for that purpose, European Rail Timetable Limited. The new company was owned by John Potter, who had been a member of the former editorial staff. The new version did not include Thomas Cook in its title. The first issue compiled by the new company was published in March 2014, with the publication title now being European Rail Timetable.

After publication resumed under the new company, printed timetables were again published monthly initially, with expanded Summer and Winter seasonal issues each year also printed. In May 2016, a digital version of the Timetable was introduced. At the same time, the company announced that the regular June issue was being discontinued and replaced by the Summer issue, which contains additional pages of travel information.

Later in 2016, the number of monthly printed editions published per year was reduced from 12 to six—in February, April, June (as the "Summer" edition), August, October, and December ("Winter" edition). The first month for which only a digital issue was published, and no print edition, was November 2016.

Thomas Cook itself would eventually go bankrupt, on 23 September 2019. The Timetable was unaffected, having been independent of Thomas Cook since 2014, and continues to be published.

In autumn 2021, in response to a widespread drop in travel during the COVID-19 pandemic, which in turn put a strain on ERT's financial situation, the company reduced the number of print editions per year from six to four (one per season), but with digital editions continuing to be published monthly. With that change, the use of the timetable's longstanding International Standard Serial Number (ISSN), for periodicals, was discontinued and, instead, each print edition is assigned an International Standard Book Number (ISBN). The publisher changed to thinner paper for the print editions in early 2023, but in January 2025 (starting with the Winter 2024/2025 edition) changed to "much heavier" paper.

In January 2025, John Potter and his wife Irene sold the company, European Rail Timetable Limited, to Tronos Holdings Ltd. The number of printed editions per year was further reduced in early 2025, to two – in January and June each year (named the Winter and Summer editions) – while digital editions continued to be published every month.

== Usage ==
Users and buyers of the Timetable have included independent travellers (both tourist and business travellers), travel agents, book shops, libraries and railway enthusiasts. The Timetable has been suggested as a useful reference by travel writers in various media, such as The New York Times, and by many noted travel-guide writers. Fodor's has recommended Cook's Timetable for travellers to Europe who "want to be really knowledgeable about train times in Europe", while Let's Go Travel Guides has called it "the ultimate reference" for rail travellers on the continent. In Europe Through the Back Door 2005, Rick Steves wrote that the Thomas Cook European Timetable is worth considering by any rail travellers who prefer a book format over Internet sources, when planning or taking a trip. Guide-book editor Stephen Birnbaum described the Timetable in 1991 as "a weighty and detailed compendium of European national and international rail services that constitutes the most revered and accurate railway reference in existence." It has also been recommended by the travel website, The Man in Seat Sixty-One. A writer in a different genre, British novelist Malcolm Pryce, listed the Thomas Cook European Timetable as one of his favourite travel-related "reads" and suggested that it would appeal to those who are nostalgic for the romance of railway travel.

== See also ==
- Rail transport in Europe
- Official Guide of the Railways
- List of railroad-related periodicals
- Cook's Travellers Handbooks
