= Reference (disambiguation) =

A reference is a relationship in which one object designates or links to another.

Reference or reference point may also refer to:

- Reference (computer science)
  - Reference (C++)
- Reference (film), a 1985 Bulgarian film
- Reference, a citation, i.e., a link to a source of information
- Reference design, in engineering
- Reference desk, in a library
- Reference question, a concept in Canadian public law
- Reference work, a dictionary, encyclopedia, etc.
- Reference.com, an online reference source
- Digital reference, a library reference service conducted online
- Letter of reference
- Sense and reference (Bedeutung) or Reference, Frege's term for that which an expression designates

== See also ==
- Cross-reference
- Refer (disambiguation)
- Referee (disambiguation)
- Referent
- Reference point (disambiguation)
- Self-reference
- Terms of reference
- Web indexing
- For Wikipedia's reference guideline, see Wikipedia:Citing sources
