= Cook's Travellers Handbooks =

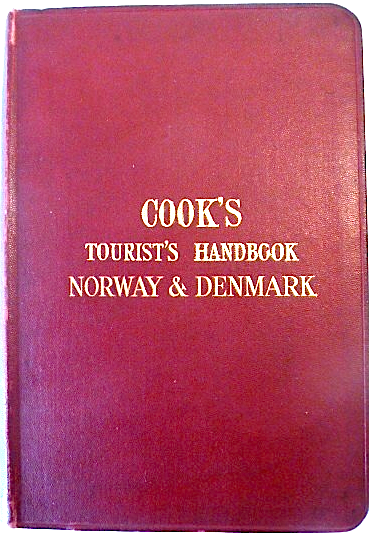
Cook's Handbook to Norway and Denmark, 1907

Cook's Tourists' Handbooks were a series of travel guide books for tourists published in the 19th-20th centuries by Thomas Cook & Son of London. The firm's founder, Thomas Cook, produced his first handbook to England in the 1840s, later expanding to Europe, Near East, North Africa, and beyond. Compared with other guides such as Murray's, Cook's aimed at "a broader and less sophisticated middle-class audience." The books served to advertise Cook's larger business of organizing travel tours. The series continues today as Traveller Guides issued by Thomas Cook Publishing of Peterborough, England.

== List of Cook's travel guides by geographic coverage ==
=== Belgium ===
- Cook's Tourist's Handbook for Holland, Belgium, and the Rhine, London: T. Cook & Son, 1874
  - Cook's Tourist's Handbook for Holland, Belgium, and the Rhine, London: T. Cook & Son, 1877
  - 1880 ed.
  - Cook's Tourist's Handbook for Holland, Belgium, the Rhine and Black Forest, London: T. Cook & Son, 1901
- Traveller's Handbook for Belgium and the Ardennes, London: T. Cook & Son, 1911
  - Traveller's Handbook for Belgium and the Ardennes, London: T. Cook & Son, 1921

=== China ===
- Cook's Handbook for Tourists to Peking, Tientsin, Shan-Hai-Kwan, Mukden, Dalny, Port Arthur, and Seoul, London: Thomas Cook & Son, 1910

=== France ===
- Cook's Guide to Paris
- Cook's Handbook to the Health Resorts of the South of France, London: Thomas Cook & Son, 1881
  - 1900 ed.
  - 1905 ed.
- Cook's Handbook for Normandy and Brittany, London: T. Cook & Son, 1883
  - Thomas Cook Ltd. (1898), Cook's handbook for Normandy and Brittany .., London: T. Cook & Son, OCLC 8376896, OL 6905295M

=== Germany ===
- Cook's Tourist's Handbook for the Black Forest, London: T. Cook & Son, 1876
- Cook's Tourist's Handbook for the Rhine (South-Western Germany) and the Black Forest, London: T. Cook & Son, 1906

=== Great Britain ===
- Handbook of the Trip to Liverpool. Leicester: T. Cook. 1845.
  - 1998 reprint
- Cook's Scottish Tourist Practical Directory, London: Thomas Cook, 1866
- Cook's Handbook for London, London: Thos. Cook & Son, 1878
  - Cook's Handbook for London, London: T. Cook & Son, 1881
  - 1905 ed.
  - 1911 ed.
  - 1921 ed.

=== India ===
- India, Burma, Ceylon and South Africa, London: T. Cook & Son, 1904

=== Italy ===
- Cook's Handbook to Florence, London: T. Cook & Son, 1874
  - 1875 ed.
  - 1901 ed.
- Cook's Handbook to Venice, London: T. Cook & Son, 1874
  - 1901 ed.
- Cook's Tourist's Handbook for Southern Italy, London: T. Cook & Son, 1875
  - 1884 ed.
  - Cook's Tourist's Handbook for Southern Italy, Rome and Sicily., London: Thos. Cook & son., 1905
- Cook's Tourist's Handbook for Northern Italy, London: Thomas Cook & Son, 1875
  - Cook's Tourist's Handbook for Northern Italy, London: T. Cook & Son, 1881
- Cook's Handbook to Naples and Environs, London: T. Cook & Son, 1922, OCLC 11961945, OL 23291094M

=== Netherlands ===
- Cook's Tourist's Handbook for Holland, Belgium, and the Rhine, London: T. Cook & Son, 1874
  - Cook's Tourist's Handbook for Holland, Belgium, and the Rhine, London: T. Cook & Son, 1877
  - 1880 ed.

=== New Zealand ===
- New Zealand as a Tourist and Health Resort, Auckland: T. Cook & Son, 1902, OCLC 18158487, OL 7093583M
  - 1903 ed.

=== North Africa ===
- Cook's Tourists' Handbook for Egypt, London: T. Cook & Son, 1876
- E.A. Wallis Budge (1901). The Nile (7th ed.). T. Cook & Son (Egypt) Ltd. – via Open Library. + index
  - 1905 ed.
- Cook's Practical Guide to Algiers, Algeria and Tunisia, London: T. Cook & Son, 1904
  - Cook's Practical Guide to Algeria and Tunisia, London: T. Cook & Son, 1908
- Ernest Alfred Wallis Budge (1906), Cook's Handbook for Egypt and the Sudan (2nd ed.), London: T. Cook & Son, OCLC 7434398, OL 23291093M + Index
  - 1911 ed.
  - 1921 ed.

=== Palestine and Syria ===
- Cook's Tourists' Handbook to Palestine and Syria 1876 edition

=== Scandinavia ===
- Cook's Handbook to Scandinavia
- Sweden
- Thomas Cook & Son (1907), Cook's Handbook to Norway and Denmark, with Iceland and Spitsbergen, London
  - Thomas Cook & Son (1911), Cook's Handbook to Norway and Denmark, with Iceland and Spitsbergen, London + Index
  - Thomas Cook Ltd. (1922), Traveller's Handbook for Norway and Denmark, London

=== Spain ===
- Albert F. Calvert (1912), Traveller's Handbook for Spain, London: Thomas Cook & Son

=== Switzerland ===
- Cook's Tourist's Handbook to Switzerland, London: T. Cook & Son, 1874
  - Cook's Tourist's Handbook for Switzerland, London: T. Cook & Son, 1876, OCLC 28700602, OL 6940520M
  - 1879 ed.
  - 1905 ed.
  - 1922 ed.

=== Syria ===
- Cook's Tourists' Handbook for Palestine and Syria, London: T. Cook & Son, 1876 + Index
  - J.E. Hanauer; E.G. Masterman (1907), Cook's Handbook for Palestine and Syria, London: Thos. Cook & Son + Index

== See also ==
- Thomas Cook European Timetable
