= Two Opposites Reaching Up Toward the Peak of Progress =

Artwork by Tom Queoff

- Artist: Thomas Queoff
- Year: 1977
- Type: Wausau ruby red granite
- Dimensions: 240 cm × 61 cm × 25 cm (94 in × 24 in × 10 in)
- Location: Milwaukee, Wisconsin; 43.016293°N 87.947804°W

Two Opposites Reaching Up Toward the Peak of Progress is a public art work by American artist Thomas Queoff, located on the south side of Milwaukee, Wisconsin. The granite sculpture is an obelisk made of a narrow piece of red granite cut into a tapering hourglass form. At its base, the sculpture is approximately two feet wide. As the sculpture narrows by a foot toward its midsection, the granite's surface is faceted along a diagonal line. Toward the sculpture's again wider top, a trapezoidal void in the shape of an elongated diamond divides the granite and gives it the appearance of the eye of a needle. The artwork is located in the traffic median on S. Layton Blvd. between W. Greenfield Ave. and W. Orchard St.

== See also ==
- Referee
