= Reefer =

Reefer may refer to:

== Art, entertainment, and media ==
- Reefer (band), a hip-hop duo consisting of Nicholas Thorburn and Daddy Kev
- Reefer, a newspaper's front-page paragraph referring to a story on an inside page

== Type of pursuit ==
- Reefer, an aquarium hobbyist who keeps corals, sea anemones, and other invertebrates associated with coral reefs
- Reefer, a midshipman engaged in sail reefing

== Transportation ==
- Reefer ship, a refrigerated ship
- Refrigerated container, used for intermodal cargo
- Refrigerated van, a refrigerated railway wagon (European practice)
- Refrigerator car, a refrigerated railroad boxcar (US practice)
- Refrigerator truck, a temperature-controlled van, truck or semi-trailer
- USS Reefer (1846), a pilot schooner purchased by the United States Navy for a dispatch boat during the Mexican–American War

== Other uses ==
- Reefer, a slang term for cannabis
- Reefer jacket, a type of jacket for midshipmen reefing sails

== See also ==
- Refer (disambiguation)
