= Base period price =

Average price for an item in a time period

A base period price is the average price for an item in a specified time period used as a base for an index, such as 1910–14, 1957–59, 1967, 1977, or 1982. Time series of data are often deflated to a base period price. Such deflated time series are referred to as constant dollar values (versus nominal dollar values).
