= Thomas Cook & Son =

British transport and travel company (1841–2001)

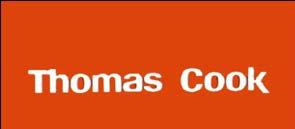
- Type: Private company: 1841–1948, 1972–2001; Government-owned (British Transport Commission): 1948–72
- Industry: Hospitality, tourism
- Founded: 5 July 1841; 185 years ago in Leicester, England
- Founder: Thomas Cook
- Defunct: 2001
- Fate: Acquired by C&N Touristic AG
- Successor: Thomas Cook AG
- Headquarters: London, United Kingdom
- Area served: Worldwide
- Owner: HM Government (1948–1972)
- Parent: British Transport Commission (1948–1972)
- Website: Thomas Cook Group site at the Wayback Machine (archived 17 January 1998)

Thomas Cook & Son, originally simply Thomas Cook, was a British travel company that existed from 1841 to 2001. It arranged transport, tours and holidays worldwide. It was owned by the British government from 1948 to 1972.

The company was founded by Thomas Cook in 1841 to carry temperance supporters by railway between the cities of Leicester, Nottingham, Derby and Birmingham. In 1851, Cook arranged transport to the Great Exhibition of 1851. He organised his first tours to Europe in 1855 and to the United States in 1866.

In 1865, the founder's son John Mason Cook began working for the company full-time. In 1871, he became a partner, and the name of the company was changed to Thomas Cook & Son. The company was nationalised in 1948, along with the railways, becoming part of the British Transport Commission. After de-nationalisation in 1972, it was acquired by a consortium of Trust House Forte, Midland Bank and the Automobile Association, then subsequently bought by Westdeutsche Landesbank in 1992. In 2001, Thomas Cook was acquired by the German company C&N Touristic AG, which changed its name to Thomas Cook AG.

== History ==
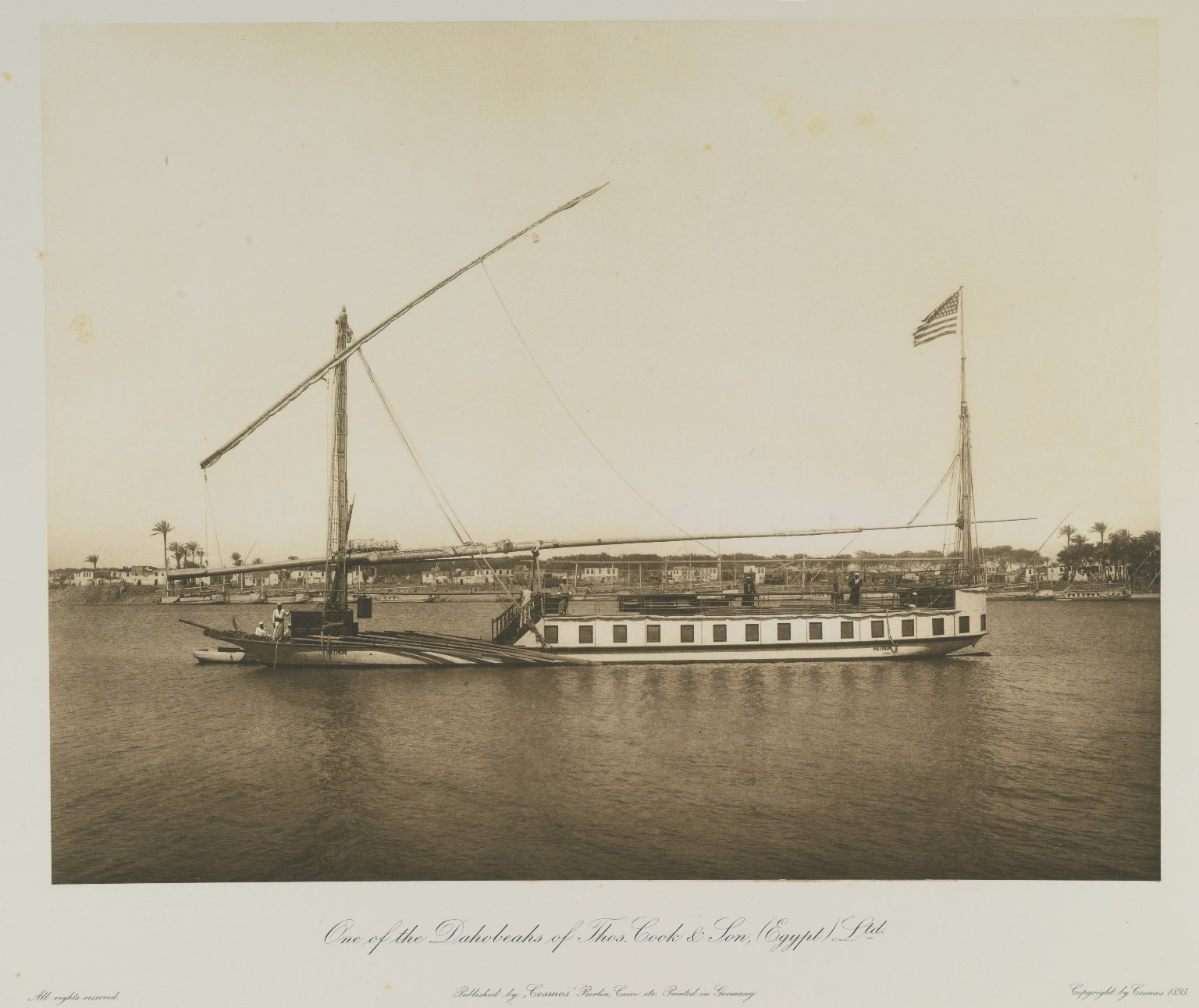
One of the dahabeahs of Thomas Cook & Son, (Egypt) Ltd. Berlin: Cosmos art publishing Co., 1893. Brooklyn Museum Archives

Thomas Cook & Son was founded by Thomas Cook, a cabinet-maker and former Baptist preacher, in 1841, under the name Thomas Cook, to carry temperance supporters by railway between the cities of Leicester, Nottingham, Derby and Birmingham. The company's first excursion was a one-day rail trip, from Leicester to Loughborough and back; the price of one shilling included a meal. This has been described as the world's first package tour.

In 1851, the founder arranged transport to the Great Exhibition of 1851. He organised his first tours to Europe in 1855 and to the United States in 1866. In 1865, the founder's son John Mason Cook began working for the company full-time. In 1871, he became a partner, and the name of the company was changed to Thomas Cook & Son.

Thomas Cook acquired business premises on Fleet Street, London, in 1865. The office also contained a shop which sold travel accessories, including guide books, luggage, telescopes and footwear. Thomas saw his venture as both religious and social service; his son provided the commercial expertise that allowed the company to expand. In accordance with his beliefs, he and his wife also ran a small temperance hotel above the office. Their business model was refined by the introduction of the 'hotel coupon' in 1868. Detachable coupons in a counterfoil book were issued to the traveller. These were valid for either a restaurant meal or an overnight hotel stay, provided they were on Cook's list.

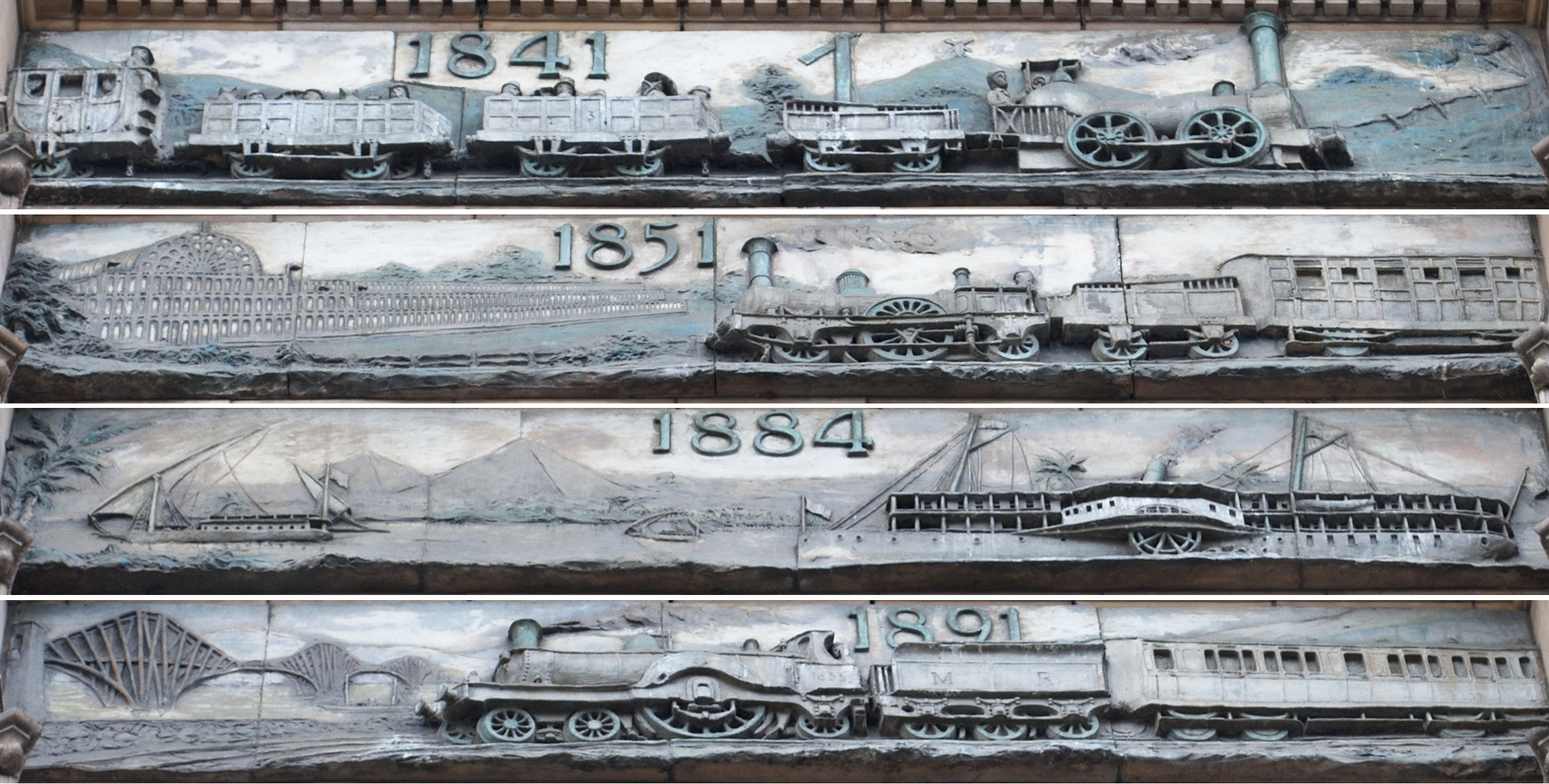
Panels from the Thomas Cook Building in Leicester, displaying excursions offered by Thomas Cook

In 1866, the agency organised the first escorted tours of the United States for British travellers, picking up passengers from several departure points. John Mason Cook led the excursion which included tours of several Civil War battlefields. In 1871, a brief but bitter partnership called Cook, Son and Jenkins was formed in the United States with an American businessman.

The first escorted round-the-world tour departed from London in September 1872. It included a steamship across the Atlantic, a stage coach across America, a paddle steamer to Japan, and an overland journey across China and India.

In 1873, publication of the quarterly (monthly from 1883) Cook's Continental Timetable began. It continues to be published in 2021, but no longer by Thomas Cook Publishing, which was wound up by its parent company in 2013; the timetable was relaunched in 2014 by an independent company, under the title European Rail Timetable, no longer affiliated with Thomas Cook Group.

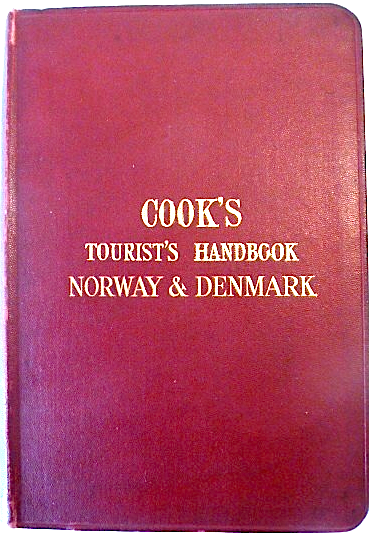
Cooks 1907 Handbook to Norway and Denmark

In 1874, Thomas Cook introduced his "circular notes", a product that was originally devised by a London banker in the 1770s and was later superseded by American Express's "traveller's cheques".

Conflicts of interest between father and son were resolved when the son persuaded his father, Thomas Cook, to retire at the end of 1878. He moved back to Leicester and lived quietly until his death. The firm's growth was consolidated by John Mason Cook and his three sons, especially by its involvement with military transport and postal services for Britain and Egypt during the 1880s when Cook began organising tours to the Middle East.

In 1884, the British Government attempted to relieve General Gordon from Khartoum. The British army was transported up the Nile by Thomas Cook & Son.

The company had established offices around the world by 1888, including three in Australia and one in Auckland, New Zealand, and in 1890, the company sold over 3.25 million tickets. A husband and wife might, for example, pay £85 for a Thomas Cook tour of Germany, Switzerland, and France over six weeks. While expensive enough that the trip would likely be the only one in the couple's lifetime, the company would arrange for a variety of activities new to the middle-class, including museum visits, the opera, and mountain climbing. John Mason Cook promoted, and even led, excursions to, for example, the Middle East where he was described as "the second-greatest man in Egypt".

In 1895 Thomas Cook & Sons was selected by the International Olympic Committee, to be in charge of the publicity and organization of transportation for the Olympic Games. This contract was active for the 1896, 1900, and 1904 games. For the 1896 games in Athens, Cook & Sons would buy up hotel rooms throughout the city holding a monopoly on tourism during the Olympics.

=== Non-family ownership ===
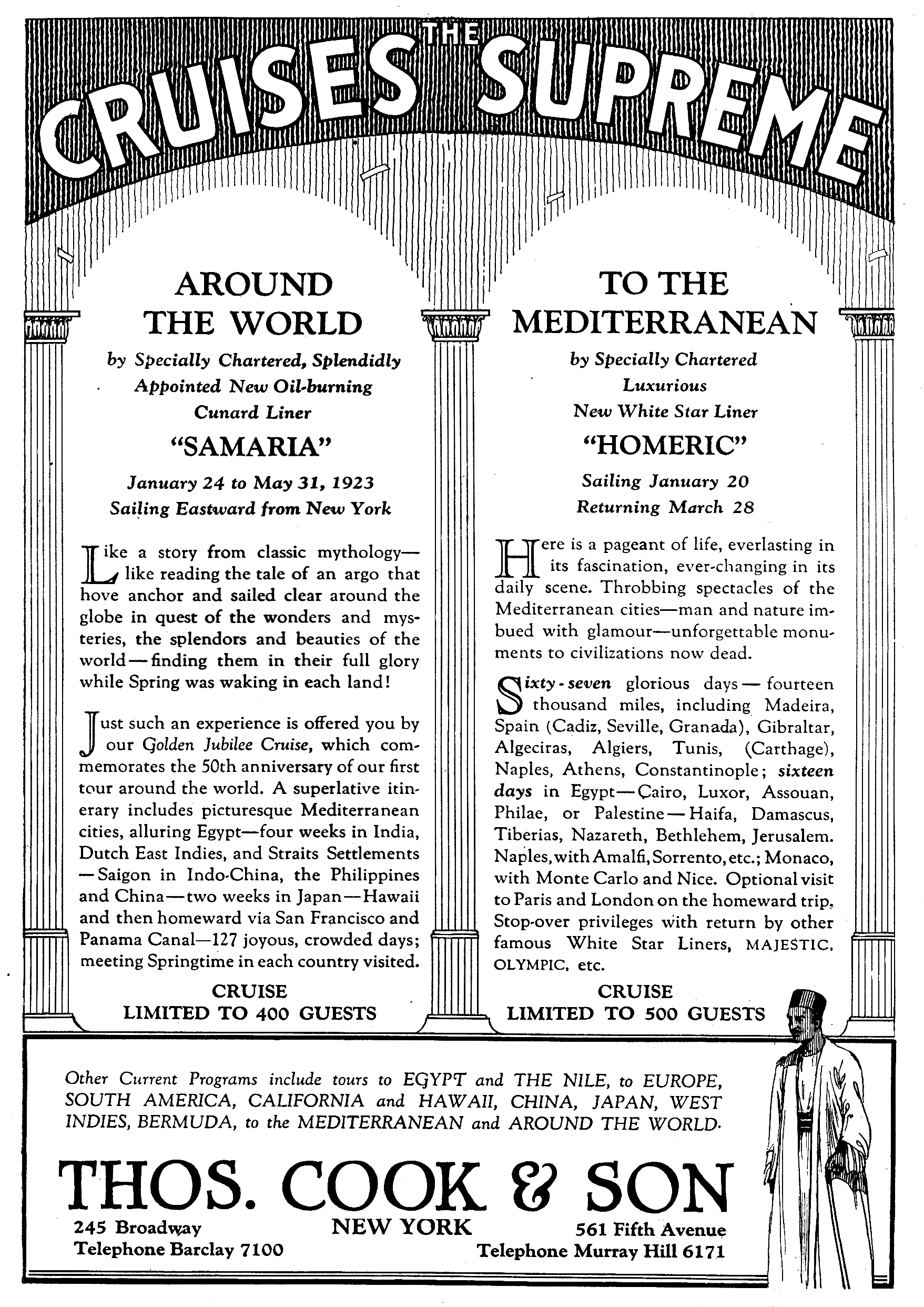
Thos. Cook & Son ad 1922

With the boom in travel in the Edwardian era, John Mason Cook's sons, Frank Henry, Thomas Albert and Ernest Edward, were even more successful than their father and grandfather had been at running the business. In 1924, the company was renamed Thomas Cook & Son Ltd., after acquiring limited liability status. Frank and Ernest opened a new headquarters in Berkeley Street, London in 1926, but unexpectedly sold the business two years later to the Compagnie Internationale des Wagons-Lits et des Grandes Express Européens, operator of the Orient Express.

After the Fall of France, the Paris headquarters of the Wagons-Lits company was seized by the Germans, and the British assets taken over by the Custodian of Enemy Property.

In 1942, Thomas Cook & Son was sold to Hay's Wharf Cartage Company, which was owned by the four major British railway companies. The company was nationalised along with the railways in 1948, becoming part of the British Transport Commission.

In the late 1950s, the company began showing information films at town halls throughout Britain to promote "foreign holidays", particularly France, Italy, Switzerland and Spain. The company sold "inclusive tours" using scheduled airlines but refused to sell cheap package holidays which compromised on quality and service. As a result, the company began to lose market share during the 1950s and 1960s, although its operating profits exceeded £1 million for the first time in 1965. The company was denationalised in 1972, when it was acquired from the British Government by a consortium of Trust House Forte, Midland Bank and the Automobile Association. Midland Bank acquired sole control in 1977.

The company's name was altered from Thomas Cook & Son, Ltd, to Thomas Cook Group Ltd in 1974, and the company began to relocate most of its administrative functions from London to Peterborough in 1977.

During the 1980s, Thomas Cook had its most visible business presence in the United States, including robust sales of traveller's cheques to regional American banks. The company had enough business critical mass to set up a computer centre near Princeton, New Jersey. Robert Gaffney, Charles Beach, Robin Dennis and Anthony Horne were some of the notable decision-makers in that era. Robert Maxwell bought substantial holdings in the company in 1988 and still held that interest when Crimson/Heritage purchased the U.S. division of Thomas Cook for US$1.3 billion in 1989.

In June 1992, following the acquisition of Midland Bank by HSBC, Thomas Cook was sold to the German bank Westdeutsche Landesbank (WestLB) and the charter airline LTU Group for £200 million.

In September 1994, American Express (Amex) bought the corporate travel interests of Thomas Cook Travel Inc. which represented about ten percent of the British company's total revenue. However, Amex was not able to buy the venerable Thomas Cook name; an American Express affiliate, Cook Travel Inc., had been operating under that name since 1991 in the United States.

Due to contractual difficulties, LTU Group sold its 10% shares to WestLB in May 1995. During 1996 the company bought short-haul operator Sunworld and European city-breaks tour group Time Off. Within three years the company had combined Sunworld, Sunset, Inspirations, Flying Colours and Caledonian Airways into the JMC (for "John Mason Cook") brand.

On 2 February 1999, the Carlson Leisure Group merged with Thomas Cook into a holding company owned by West LB, Carlson Inc and Preussag Aktiengesellschaft.

In 2000, the company announced its intention to sell its financial services division, in order to concentrate on tours and holidays. In March 2001 the financial services division was sold to Travelex, who retained the right to use the Thomas Cook brand on traveller's cheques for five years. It sold off its worldwide foreign exchange business to Travelex in November 2000.

In 2001, Thomas Cook was acquired by the German company C&N Touristic AG, which changed its name to Thomas Cook AG. which then merged with MyTravel Group to become Thomas Cook Group in 2007 and collapsed in 2019. The brand was relaunched as Thomas Cook Tourism in 2020.

=== Archive ===
The company's archive was transferred to the Record Office for Leicestershire, Leicester and Rutland, having been acquired in December 2019 by a competitive bidding process. A £40,000 grant from The National Archives funded an online catalogue.

== See also ==
- Cook's Travellers Handbooks
- Thomas Cook's Rugby Club 1910-1966
