= Referee (Queoff) =

Public artwork by Tom Queoff

- Artist: Tom Queoff
- Year: 1978
- Type: Laminated marble sculpture
- Dimensions: 290 cm (114 in)
- Location: West Kilbourn Ave. and North 4th St., Milwaukee; 43°2′30.341″N 87°55′0.25″W
- Owner: Administered by the City of Milwaukee

Referee is a public artwork by American artist Tom Queoff, located on the south entrance of the UW–Milwaukee Panther Arena, which is in Milwaukee, Wisconsin, United States. The 9 foot laminated marble sculpture depicts an abstracted referee with legs spread apart and arms raised.

== Description ==
Tom Queoff's Referee is made of white laminated travertine marble which has been carved into the simplified figure of a referee. The referee stands with his legs out in an inverted "V" shape, and has both arms raised up and bent at the elbows. His face consists of a negative oval space. There are no inscriptions on the sculpture.

== Historical information ==
Referee was funded through the Comprehensive Employment and Training Act (CETA), a program that operated in Wisconsin from 1977 through 1981. The program's goal was to give university-trained artists the opportunity to create artworks, while finding them employment within their communities. Thirty Wisconsin artists participated in CETA during its short run. Tom Queoff joined the City of Milwaukee's CETA from 1977 to 1978. During this time he shared a studio with another sculptor, and worked on various art projects for the city. One of these projects was Referee. Since CETA could not afford to pay for an artist's materials, Queoff had the marble for the sculpture donated by the Milwaukee Marble Company. The marble was the remainders from the First Wisconsin Bank building's construction. The artist laminated the marble pieces together and then carved the sculpture out of this resulting material. Although the artwork sat in storage for some time, it was eventually placed on the south entrance of UW–Milwaukee Panther Arena in Milwaukee.

== Artist ==
Tom Queoff was born and raised in Green Bay, Wisconsin. He received a BFA from the University of Wisconsin–Milwaukee in 1975, and an MFA from the same school in 1977. Queoff established the Thomas Queoff Studio and Gallery in 1978. In 1985 he was introduced to snow carving, an activity he excelled at. The sculptor has taught at Cardinal Stritch University and received various awards at snow competitions, including the Finland International Snow Sculpting Championship in 1987 and 1988. Queoff was a member of the 2002 US Olympic snow sculpting team and was named a snow sculpting US National Champion. His studio is currently located in the Historic Third Ward, Milwaukee.

Tom Queoff created the Miller Valley Veterans Monument, which was unveiled on November 11, 2010, at the MillerCoors Brewery. The sculpture, an American bald eagle, is meant to honor the Miller-Coors employees killed in military action. He also created the sculpture United We Stand in front of Froedtert Hospital.

== See also ==
- Two Opposites Reaching Up Toward the Peak of Progress
- RiverSculpture!
- Frontier Airlines Center
