= Thomas Cook =

English businessman (1808–1892)

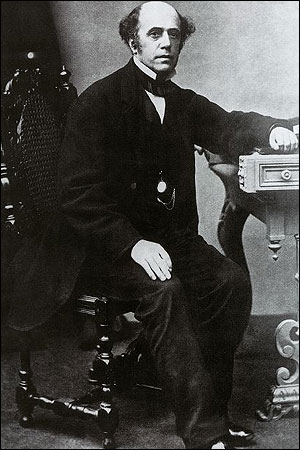
- Born: 22 November 1808; Melbourne, Derbyshire, England
- Died: 18 July 1892 (aged 83); Leicester, England
- Occupation: Founder of Thomas Cook & Son
- Organization: Thomas Cook & Son

Thomas Cook (22 November 1808 – 18 July 1892) was the founder of the travel agency Thomas Cook & Son. He was born into a poor family in Derbyshire and left school at the age of ten to start work as a gardener's boy. He served an apprenticeship as a cabinet maker before becoming an itinerant Baptist preacher. He was a supporter of the temperance movement and his first foray into tourism was a railway excursion to Loughborough for members of the Leicester Temperance Society in 1841. Following the success of this excursion, Cook, by then settled with his family in Leicester, began to organise tours further afield in the British Isles and, eventually, to the United States, Egypt and the Holy Land. In 1872, he went into business with his son as Thomas Cook & Son, with a head office in London. Following his retirement in 1878, he returned to Leicester and took an interest in the Baptist church and charitable work until his death. Cook is credited with having, through his all-inclusive tours, made travel and tourism accessible to a wider public.

== Early life ==
Thomas Cook was born on 22 November 1808 to Elizabeth and John Cook, who lived in a small cottage in Quick Close in the village of Melbourne, Derbyshire. His father was a labourer who died when Cook was four years old; his mother was the daughter of a New Connexion Baptist preacher. At the age of 10, Cook left school and started working as a gardener's boy on Lord Melbourne's estate, while continuing his education at Sunday School and later becoming a Sunday School teacher. In 1828, he left an apprenticeship as a cabinet-maker to become an itinerant Baptist preacher, distributing tracts and setting up Sunday Schools in villages in the South Midlands for an annual salary of £36. In 1829, he met Marianne Mason, a farmer's daughter and Sunday School teacher from Barrowden in Rutland. The couple married on 3 March 1833 at St Peter's Church, Barrowden and set up home in Market Harborough in Leicestershire, with Cook working as a wood turner. They had one surviving son, John Mason Cook, and daughter, Annie Elizabeth.

== First excursions ==
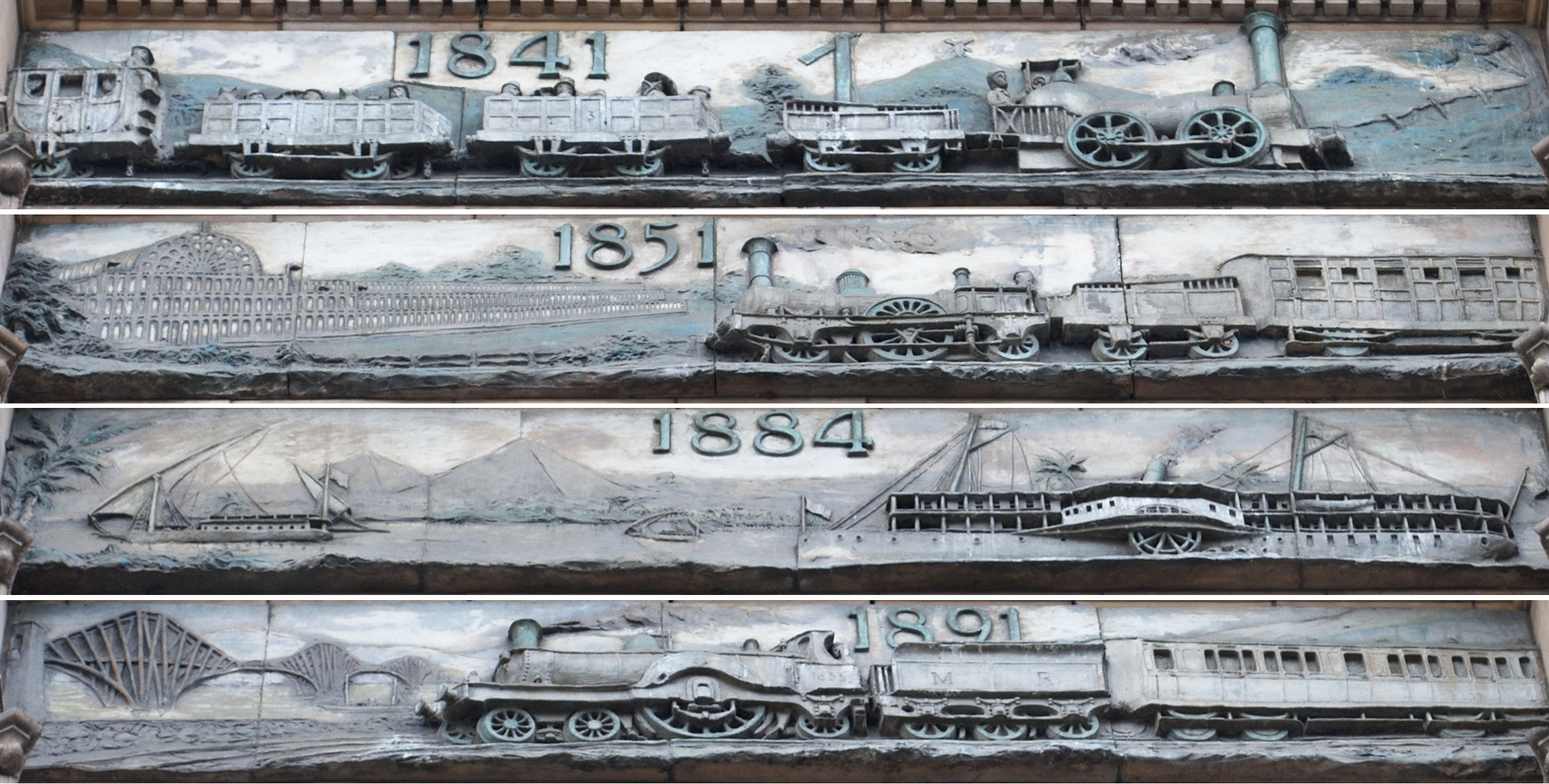
Panels from the Thomas Cook Building, Gallowtree Gate, Leicester, displaying excursions offered by Thomas Cook

While he was living at Market Harborough, Cook became a supporter of the temperance movement. In 1836, both he and Marianne signed the pledge and Cook became active in campaigning for abstention from alcohol. Cook described how he got the idea for his first railway excursion when he was walking the 15 miles from his home to Leicester in June 1841 to attend a temperance meeting: "A thought flashed through my brain – what a glorious thing it would be if the newly developed powers of railways and locomotion could be made subservient to the promotion of temperance". Cook's plan came to fruition on 5 July 1841, when he took a party of 485 members of the Leicester Temperance Society on a rail excursion from Leicester Campbell Street Railway Station to Loughborough to attend a temperance meeting. He charged passengers one shilling each to cover the cost of hiring a train from the Midland Counties Railway. On the 150th anniversary of the excursion, a statue of Cook by James Butler was unveiled outside Leicester Railway Station.

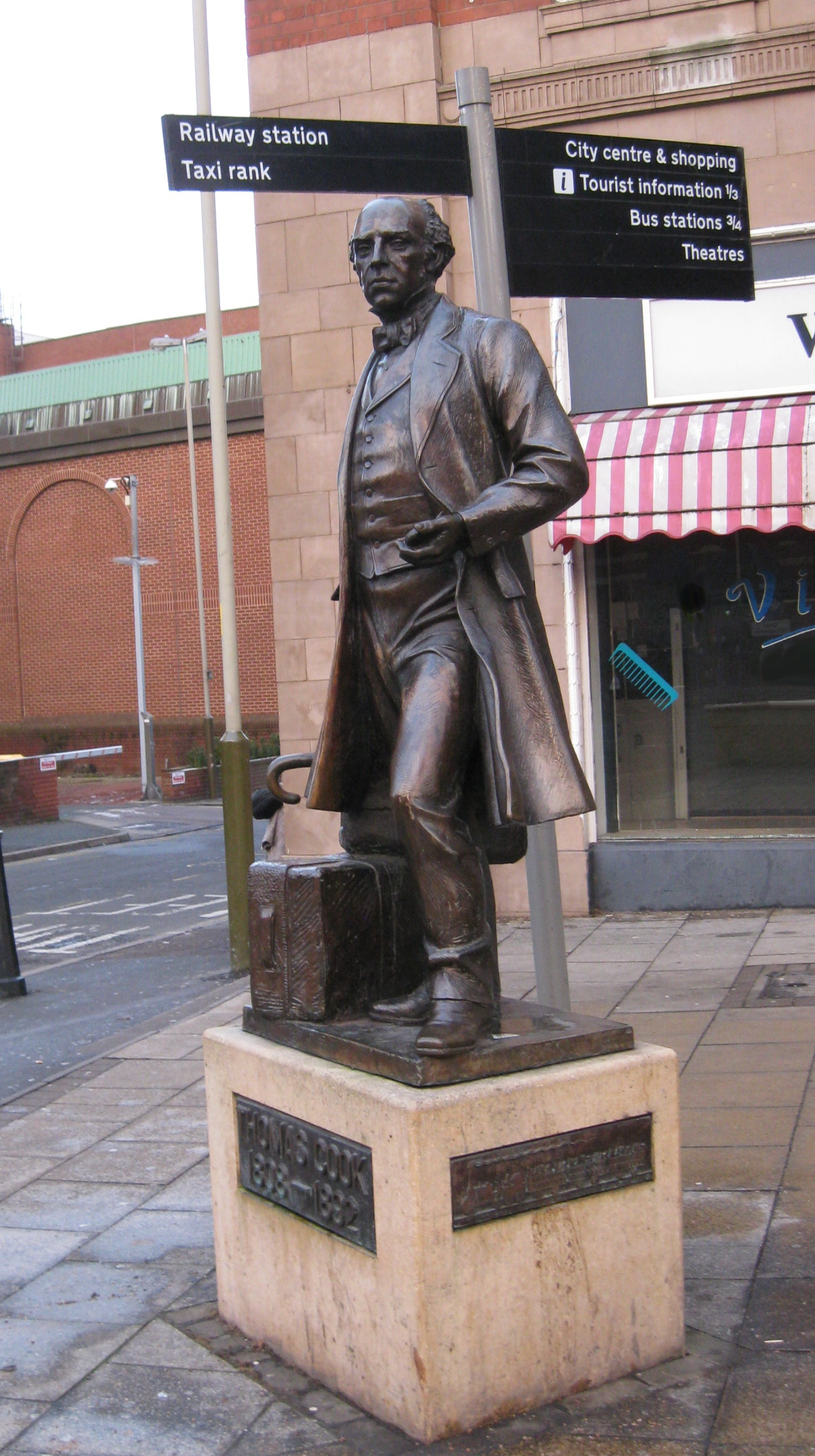
Statue near Leicester railway station

Later in the year 1841, Cook moved to Leicester and set up as a bookseller and printer. He also ran two temperance hotels with his wife and his mother. In 1845, he organised his first profit-making excursion, taking a party to Liverpool, Caernarfon and Mount Snowdon. The following year he branched out with tours to Scotland and in 1851 he arranged for 165,000 people to travel to the Great Exhibition in London. That same year he began publishing Cook's Excursionist, a monthly magazine which, as well as advice to travellers and advertisements for travel goods, contained testimonials from people who had been on Cook's tours. One traveller wrote: "Everything is organised, everything is catered for, one does not have to bother oneself with anything at all, neither timings, nor luggage nor hotels".

== Foreign tours ==
Having organised tours in England, Scotland, Wales, Ireland and the Isle of Man over the previous decade, Cook planned his first excursion abroad in 1855, "a grand circular tour of the Continent", visiting major cities in Belgium, Germany and France and enabling tourists to visit the Paris Exhibition. In 1862, Scottish railway companies stopped issuing cheap group tickets for tour groups and Cook turned his attention further afield, to Switzerland and Italy, the United States, Egypt and the Holy Land.

In 1865, Cook acquired business premises on Fleet Street in London. The office also contained a shop which sold essential travel accessories, including guide books, luggage, and footwear. In 1872, he formed a partnership with his son, John Mason Andrew Cook, and renamed the travel agency as Thomas Cook & Son. In 1868, the company introduced "hotel coupons" which were issued to travellers and could be exchanged for restaurant meals and hotel accommodation. "Circular notes", a form of traveller's cheque, were introduced in 1874 and enabled tourists to obtain local currency. Cook made his first round-the-world tour in 1874, and the same year advertised an annual conducted trip for 200 guineas.

While Cook travelled the world, his son stayed at home to run the company, moving to a new London headquarters at Ludgate Circus. Cook and his son had different attitudes towards the business, with John Mason Cook being the more commercially-minded, and, after a number of quarrels, Cook retired from the partnership in 1878.

== Later life and death ==
Following his retirement, Cook moved back to Leicester to a house, Thorncroft, he had had built on London Road. His later years were marred by the death of his daughter in 1880 and of his wife in 1884 and by increasing loss of sight. He still managed to travel and went to the Holy Land in 1888. At home, he continued his work for the Baptist Church, the temperance movement, and other charities. He died following a stroke on 18 July 1892. He was buried in Welford cemetery in Leicester. His wealth at death was £2731 7s. 2d His son died in 1899, leaving an estate of £622,534 3s. 4d. The business of Thomas Cook & Son was then run by Cook's three grandsons.

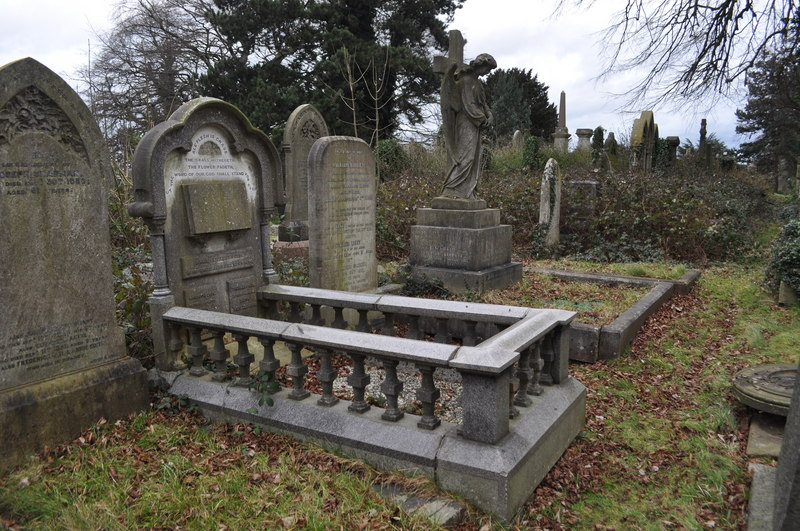
Cook's grave in Welford Road Cemetery, Leicester

== Legacy ==
Cook is commemorated in the village of his childhood, Melbourne, by almshouses and a chapel he had built in 1890. A plaque reads:"General Baptist Memorial Cottages and Mission Hall. Erected by Thomas Cook, a Native of Melbourne 1890". In Leicester he is commemorated by his statue outside the railway station in London Road and a blue plaque on his home, Thorncroft.

Historian of tourism Alan McNee described Cook as "perhaps the nineteenth century's greatest force for popularizing and democratizing travel", writing:

Although the firm and its clients were often criticized by conservative commentators as a vulgarizing and destructive influence, Cook’s promotion of 'excursion' travel allowed a huge number of ordinary British men and women to experience travel in a way that would have been unimaginable for their parents and grandparents. In doing so, Cook transformed the fields of tourism and leisure.

== See also ==
- Cook's Travellers Handbooks
- Thomas Cook European Timetable
