= Reference point =

Reference point or similar may refer to:

== Mathematics and science ==
- Reference point (physics), used to define a frame of reference
- Reference point, a point within a reference range or reference interval, which is a range of values found in healthy persons
- Reference point, a measurement taken during a standard state or reference state, used in chemistry to calculate properties under different conditions

== Other uses ==
- Reference Point (horse), a 1980s British racehorse
- Reference point, a benchmark utility level in prospect theory
- Reference Point, a 1990 Acoustic Alchemy album

== See also ==
- Benchmark (disambiguation)
- Reference (disambiguation)
