= List of programs broadcast by Nine Network =

The following list of programs are currently broadcast by the Nine Network / 9HD, 9Go!, 9Gem, 9Life and 9Rush as well as their regional affiliates, including WIN, NBN and Imparja as well as catch-up service 9Now. Some regional and remote stations have alternate schedules and may air programs at different times.

== Current broadcasts ==
=== Domestic ===
==== News and current affairs ====
- Local bulletins
  - Nine News – local bulletins produced in Sydney/Melbourne/Brisbane/Adelaide/Perth, Nightly 6pm to 7pm (1956–present)
  - Nine's Afternoon News – local bulletin produced in Sydney/Melbourne/Brisbane/Adelaide/Perth, 4pm to 5pm weekdays (2004–2009, 2009–present)
  - NBN News – local bulletin produced in Newcastle, Weeknights 5:30pm to 6pm (1972–present)
  - Nine Gold Coast News – local bulletin produced in Gold Coast, Weeknights 5:30pm to 6pm (1996–present)
- National programs produced by TCN-9 Sydney
  - 60 Minutes – weekly current affairs program, Sunday evenings (1979–present)
  - A Current Affair – daily current affairs program, Weeknights (Monday to Friday) and Saturdays 7pm (1971–1978, 1988–present)
  - Today Early News – weekdays 5am (1990s–2003, 2005, 2008–present)
  - Nine's Morning News – weekdays 11.30am (1981–present) (local edition also produced in Brisbane)
  - Today – weekdays 5:30am to 9am (1982–present)
  - Today Extra – weekdays 9am to 11:30am, Saturdays 10am to 12pm (2012–present)
  - Under Investigation with Liz Hayes (2021–present)
  - Weekend Today – weekends 7am to 10am (2009–present)
  - Nine News Late – Sundays 9:30pm (2020–present)
- National programs produced by GTV-9 Melbourne
  - Nine News: First At Five (Nine's Afternoon News weekend bulletin) – weekends 5pm (2011–present)
- National programs produced by STW-9 Perth
  - Nine News Late – Weeknights after 10:30pm (Except Fridays) (2020–present)

==== Variety / Entertainment ====
- The Hundred with Andy Lee (2021–present)

==== Reality ====
- Big Miracles (2023)
- The Block (2003–2004, 2010–present)
- Dream Listing: Byron Bay (2022)
- Gordon Ramsay's Food Stars (2024)
- Lego Masters (2019–present)
  - Christmas specials (2021–)
- Love Island Australia (2018–2019, 2021–present)
- Parental Guidance (2021–present)
- Married at First Sight (2015–present)
- The Summit (2023–24)
- Travel Guides (2017–present)
- The Golden Bachelor (reality, 2025-present)

==== Observational / documentaries ====
- Beyond The Dream (2024)
- Bondi Vet: Coast to Coast (2019–present)
- Desert Vet (2019–present)
- Do You Want to Live Forever? (2024–present)
- Australian Crime Stories (2010–2011 on CI, 2019–present on Nine)
- Emergency (2020–present)
- For the Love of Pets (2023–present)
- Mega Zoo (2021–present)
- Million Dollar Murders (2022)
- Missing Persons Investigation (2022)
- Paramedics (2018–present)
- RBT (2010–present)
- RPA (1995–2012, 2023–)
- Taronga: Who's Who in the Zoo (2020–present)

==== Game shows ====
- Tipping Point Australia (2023–present)
- Jeopardy! Australia (2024–present)
- The Floor (2025–present)

==== Lifestyle ====
- Adelady (South Australia) (2015–present)
- Budget Battlers
- Country Home Rescue (2022)
- Country House Hunters Australia (2020–present)
- Cybershack (2008–present)
- Delish (2017–present on 9Life) Guru Productions
- The Garden Gurus (2002–present) Guru Productions
- The Garden Hustle
- Getaway (1992–present)
- Good Food Kitchen (2021–present)
- Listing Melbourne (2024)
- Luxury Homes Revealed (2016–present on 9Life)
- Postcards (1995–present)
- Ready Set Reno (2016–present on 9Life)
- The Road to Miss Universe Australia (2016–present on 9Life)
- South Aussie with Cosi (South Australia) (2014–present)
- Your Domain (2019–2020)
- Explore TV (2005–present) Guru Productions
- Delish Destinations (2018–present) Guru Productions
- Our State On A Plate (2014–present) Guru Productions
- Destination WA (2013–present) Guru Productions
- Destination Australia (2022 release) Guru Productions
- Everything Outdoors (2022 release) Guru Productions
- Ready 4 Adventure (2020) Guru Productions

==== Sports talk ====
- 100% Footy (2018–present)
- Cross Court (2019–present)
- Footy Classified (2007–present)
- Footy QLD (Queensland) (2017–present)
- Footy SA (South Australia) (2014–present)
- Footy WA (Western Australia) (2014–present)
- Freddy and the Eighth (2025)
- Friday Night Knock Off (Friday Night Football post-game; 2019–present)
- Future Stars (Victoria & Tasmania) (2009–present)
- Golden Point (Thursday Night Football post-game; 2019–present)
- Sports Sunday (2017–present)
- The Sunday (AFL) Footy Show (1993–present)
- The Sunday (NRL) Footy Show (1993–present)
- The Trade Table (2018–present)
- Women's Footy (2017–present)

==== Sports ====
- Cricket: The Ashes and Cricket World Cup
- Golf: U.S. Masters (1990s–2006, 2018–present)
- Horse Racing: Melbourne Cup (2024-)
- Rugby league: National Rugby League (1961–1970, 1992–present) including State of Origin (1983–1989, 1991–present)
- Rugby league: NRL Women's Premiership (2018–present)
- Rugby league: The Knock On Effect NSW Cup and Hostplus Cup (2018–present)
- Rugby union: Super Rugby Pacific (2021–present on 9Gem)
- Rugby union: Super W (2022–present) 9Gem or 9Go!
- Tennis: Australian Open including Hopman Cup, Brisbane International, Sydney International and Hobart International (2019–present), Roland-Garros (2003–2009, 2021–present), Wimbledon (1977–2010, 2021–present) and U.S. Open (1980s–2009, 2022–present)
- Olympic Games: Summer Olympic Games (1956, 1972, 1976, 2012, 2024, 2028, 2032), Winter Olympic Games (1984, 1988, 1992, 1994, 2010, 2026, 2030), Summer Paralympic Games (2024, 2028) and Winter Paralympic Games (2026)

==== Children's (9Go!) ====
- The Actually Really Very Difficult Show (2023–present)
- Earth Science Investigators (2023–present)
- TheatreDome (2025–present)

==== Annual events ====
- Carols by Candlelight (1979–present)
- Gold Week Telethon (2010–present) (Sydney only)

=== Foreign ===
==== Drama ====
- For Life
- Manifest
- New Amsterdam

==== Comedy ====
- Young Sheldon

==== Reality ====
- The Bachelor USA (9Life)
- The Bachelorette USA (9Now)
- Botched (2017–present on Nine/9Life)
- Better Late Than Never
- Survivor (2000–2009 on Nine, 2009–2014 on Nine/9Go!, 2015–present on 9Go!, shared with 10 VOD)

==== Lifestyle ====
- Antiques Roadshow (2006–2010 on Nine, 2010–present on 9Gem, Shared with ABC)

==== Observational / documentaries ====
- David Attenborough Specials (Shared with ABC)

==== Game show ====
- Pointless (2021–present)
- Tipping Point (2019–present)

==== Children's (9Go!) ====
- Booba's Adventures
- Lego City Adventures (2019–present)
- Lego Friends
- Lego Jurassic World: Legend of Isla Nublar
- Lego Monkie Kid
- Lego Ninjago: Masters of Spinjitzu (2016–present)
- Pokémon (2016–present)
- Power Players

==== Preschool (9Go!) ====
- Dino Ranch
- Earth to Luna!
- Gigantosaurus
- Gus the Itsy Bitsy Knight
- Hop
- True and the Rainbow Kingdom

==== Annual events ====
- CMA Awards
- Grammy Awards (2023)

==== Religious ====
- Joyce Meyer: Enjoying Everyday Life (9Gem)
- Believer's Voice of Victory
- Wesley Impact
- Helping Hands
- Creflo Dollar Ministries
- The Incredible Journey Presents
- Amazing Facts Presents
- In Touch Ministries
- Beyond Today
- Leading The Way
- Turning Point with Dr David Jeremiah

== Upcoming series ==
=== Domestic ===
==== 2026 ====
- Carols in the Domain (annual event, formerly Seven)
- Château DIY Australia (lifestyle)
- 1 Euro House (Reality)
- Naked City: Hitmen (Crime documentary)

==== 2027 ====
- Light: The Ian Roberts Story (Doco)
- Police (Doco series)
- Sweat It Out! (Doco series)

==== TBA ====
- Celebrity IOU Australia (reality)
- The A List (chat show)

== Formerly broadcast ==
=== Domestic ===
==== News and current affairs ====
- 9StreamLIVE (2013 on Ninemsn)
- Business Sunday (1986–2006)
- Extra (1991–2009 in QLD only)
- Financial Review Sunday (2013–2014)
- Inside Story (2014–2016)
- Nine News – regional bulletins produced in Sydney, Melbourne and Brisbane for Southern Cross Austereo throughout Southern NSW, Canberra, Regional QLD, Regional VIC and Tasmania, weeknights 5.30pm-6pm (2017–2021)
- National Nine News: Sunday Morning Edition/Nine's Sunday Morning News (August 2008 – January 2009)
- Nightline (1992–2008, 2009–2010)
- Nine News At 7.00 (August–October 2013 on GEM)
- Nine News Now (2013–2019)
- Sunday (1981–2008)
- This Afternoon (June/July 2009)
- The Verdict (2015)
- The Rebound (2021)

==== Drama ====
- After the Verdict (2022)
- The Alice (2005)
- All the Way (1988)
- Amazing Grace (2021)
- Anzacs (1985)
- Bad Mothers (2019)
- Beaconsfield (2012)
- Bite Club (2018)
- BJ and the Bear (1979)
- Blood Brothers (2011)
- Canal Road (2008)
- Chances (1991–1992)
- Cluedo (1992)
- Colour in the Creek (1985)
- Cops L.A.C. (2010)
- Counter Play (2018–2019 on 9Gem)
- Division 4 (1969–1975)
- Doctor Doctor (2016–2021)
- Emergency (1959)
- Family and Friends (1990–1991)
- Fat Tony & Co. (2014)
- The Feds (1993–1996)
- The Flying Doctors (1986–1991)
- For the Term of His Natural Life (1983)
- Gallipoli (2015)
- The Godfathers (1971–1972)
- Good Guys, Bad Guys (1997–1998)
- The Great Mint Swindle (2012)
- Halifax f.p. (1994–2002)
- Halifax: Retribution (2020)
- House Husbands (2012–2017)
- House of Bond (2017)
- The House of Hancock (2015)
- Howzat! Kerry Packer's War (2012)
- Human Error (2024)
- Hyde and Seek (2016)
- Informer 3838 (2020)
- Kings (1983)
- Law of the Land (1993)
- The Link Men (1970)
- Little Oberon (2005)
- Love Child (2014–2017)
- Luke's Kingdom (1976)
- The Man From Snowy River (1993–1996)
- McLeod's Daughters (2001–2009)
- Murder Call (1997–1999)
- Pacific Drive (1994–1995)
- Paradise Beach (1994–1995)
- The People Next Door (1973)
- Possession (1985)
- Power Games: The Packer-Murdoch War (2013)
- Rescue: Special Ops (2009–2011)
- Schapelle (2014)
- Scorched (2008)
- SeaChange (2019)
- Shannon's Mob (1975–1976)
- Silent Number (1974–1976)
- Sea Patrol (2007–2011)
- Snowy (1993)
- The Spoiler (1972)
- Spyforce (1971–1973)
- Stingers (1998–2004)
- The Strip (2008)
- The Sullivans (1976–1983)
- Tricky Business (2012)
- Twisted Tales (1996)
- Two Twisted (2006)
- Underbelly (2008)
- Underbelly: Badness (2012)
- Underbelly Files: Chopper (2018)
- Underbelly Files: Infiltration (2011)
- Underbelly Files: Tell Them Lucifer was Here (2011)
- Underbelly Files: The Man Who Got Away (2011)
- Underbelly: The Golden Mile (2010)
- Underbelly: Razor (2011)
- Underbelly: Squizzy (2013)
- Underbelly: A Tale of Two Cities (2009)
- Underbelly: Vanishing Act (2022)
- Waterloo Station (1983)
- Water Rats (1996–2001)
- Warnie (2023)
- Wicked Love: The Maria Korp Story (2010)
- The Young Doctors (1976–1983)
- Young Lions (2002)

==== Comedy ====
- Ben Elton Live From Planet Earth (2011)
- Comedy Inc (2003–2007)
- Commercial Breakdown (2007–2009)
- Flat Chat (2001)
- Hamish and Andy's Gap Year (2011–2014)
- Hamish and Andy's “Perfect Holiday” (2019)
- Here Come the Habibs (2016–2017)
- The Joy of Sets (2011)
- Just for Laughs (2007)
- Magda's Funny Bits (2006)
- Merrick & Rosso Unplanned (2003–2004)
- Monster House (2008)
- The Nation (2007)
- Surprise Surprise (2000–2001)
- Surprise Surprise Gotcha (2007)
- True Story with Hamish & Andy (2017–2018)

==== Variety / Entertainment ====
- 20 to One (2005–2011 as 20 to 1, 2016–2017)
- Accidental Heroes (2020)
- Adelaide Tonight (1959-1970s)
- Australia's Funniest Home Videos (1990–2014)
- Australia's Funniest Home Videos: World's Funniest Videos (2009)
- Australia's Naughtiest Home Videos (1992, 2008)
- Best of the Best (2009)
- The Beer Factor (2012 on 9Go!)
- Between the Lines (2011)
- Big Questions (2006)
- The Boss is Coming to Dinner (2010)
- The Catch-Up (2007)
- Celebrity Golf Shoot-Out (2006)
- Celebrity Singing Bee (2007–2009)
- The Don Lane Show (1975–1982)
- Entertainment Tonight Australia (early 1990s–late 1990s)
- The Great Weight Debate (2006)
- Hey Hey It's Saturday (1971–1999, 2010)
- Hey Hey It's Saturday: The Reunion (2009)
- The Best And Worst Of Red Faces (1992, 1993, 1994, 1995, 2006)
- Gonged But Not Forgotten: Australia's Best & Worst Of Red Faces (1998–2000, 2007–2008)
- In Brisbane Tonight (1959-1960s)
- In Melbourne Tonight (1957–1970, 1996–1998)
- Micallef Tonight (2003)
- The Mick Molloy Show (1999)
- The Midday Show (1985–1998)
- Mornings With Kerri-Anne (2002–2011)
- Movie Juice (2014–2016 on Ten; 2017–2018 on Nine)
- My Kid's a Star (2008)
- The Real Hustle: Australia (2010)
- The Robbie DeVine Show (2015)
- Rove (1999, moved to Ten 2000–2009)
- Russell Gilbert Live (2000)
- Russell Gilbert was Here! (2001)
- StarStruck (2000)
- StarStruck (2005)
- Strassman
- Sydney New Year's Eve Fireworks (1996–2006, moved to Ten 2006–2009, Nine 2009–2013, moved to ABC 2013–present)
- Talkin' 'Bout Your Generation (2009–2012 on Ten, 2018–2019 on Nine)
- The Tonight Show (1957–1970)
- Top Gear Australia (2010–2011)
- Warnie (2010)
- You're Back in the Room (2016)

==== Lifestyle ====
- Backstage Pass (2005)
- Backyard Blitz (2000–2007)
- Battlefronts (2008)
- The Boat Show
- Burke's Backyard (1987–2004)
- The Car Show (2003–2008)
- Changing Rooms (1995–2005)
- Domestic Blitz (2008–2010)
- Eat Well For Less (2018)
- Eye on Australia (1989–1990)
- Fresh (2000–2009)
- Good Medicine (1993–2002)
- Helloworld (2018–2019 on Nine, 9Life and 9Now) (screening on Seven from series 2 onwards)
- Holidays for Sale (2008)
- Hot Property (2010–2013)
- I Can Change Your Life (2005)
- Location, Location (1996–2004)
- Looking Good (1993–1995)
- Money (1993–2002)
- Money for Jam (2009)
- Our House (1993–2001)
- Random Acts of Kindness (2009–2010)
- Second Chance (2009)
- Secret Millionaire: Australia (2009–2010)
- Shopping for Love (2005/2006)
- Speed Machine
- Talking Married (2018–2019 on 9Life)
- Things To Try Before You Die (2007)
- Turn Back Your Body Clock (2006)
- Unreal Estate (2016)
- What's Cooking? (1991–1999)
- What's Good For You (2006–2009)

==== Reality ====
- The Apprentice Australia (2009)
- Aussie Ladette to Lady (2009)
- Australian Ninja Warrior (2017–2022)
- Australian Survivor (2002, aired on Seven Network in 2006, Network Ten 2016–present)
- Australia's Got Talent (2006–2012 on Seven, 2013, 2016)
- Australia's Most Identical (2024)
- Australia's Perfect Couple (2009)
- Beauty and the Geek Australia (2009–2014 on Seven, moved to Nine 2021–2022)
- Big Brother (2001–2008 on Ten, 2012–2014)
- The Briefcase (2016)
- Buying Blind (2018)
- The Celebrity Apprentice Australia (2011–2013, 2015, 2021–2022)
- Celebrity Circus (2005)
- Celebrity Overhaul (2004–2005)
- The Chopping Block (2008)
- Date Night (2018)
- Excess Baggage (2012)
- The Farmer Wants a Wife (2007–2012, 2016)
- The Great Australian Bake Off (2013, moved to LifeStyle Food)
- HomeMADE (2009)
- The Hotplate (2015)
- The Last Resort (2017)
- The Lost Tribes (2007)
- My Mum, Your Dad (2022–2023)
- The NRL Rookie (2016 on 9Go!)
- Overhaul (2006)
- Reno Rumble (2015–2016)
- Skating on Thin Ice (2005)
- Snackmasters (2021–2022)
- Top Design Australia (2011)
- Family Food Fight (2017–2018)
- Torvill and Dean's Dancing on Ice (2006)
- The Voice (2012–2020, moved to Seven in 2021)
- The Voice Kids (2014)
- When Love Comes To Town (2014)

==== Observational / documentaries ====
- 50 Years 50 Shows (2005, 2006)
- 50 Years 50 Stars (2006)
- 50 Years of Television News (2006)
- AFP: Australian Federal Police (2011–2012)
- Amazing Medical Stories (2008–2009)
- Animal Embassy (2020)
- Animal Emergency (2008) (GEM 2010–2011)
- Animal Hospital (1997–2001)
- Australia Behind Bars (2022)
- Australian Druglords (2010)
- Australian Families of Crime (2010)
- Australian Geographic (2007–2008)
- Australia's Most Wanted (1999, aired on Seven 1989–1994, 1997–1998)
- Big (2011)
- The Big Fella (2006)
- City of Evil (2018)
- The Code (2007)
- Colour of War: The Anzacs
- Crime and Justice (2007)
- Customs (2009–2010)
- Driving Test (2018)
- The Embassy (2014–2018)
- The Enforcers (2010)
- Fire 000 (2008)
- The Gift (2007–2009)
- In Conversation with Alex Malley (2016–2017)
- In Their Footsteps (2011)
- Inside the Human Body (2010) (GEM 2011–2012)
- The Lost Tribes (2007–2008)
- Hot Property (1999–2000 on Seven, moved to Nine 2010–2013)
- Kings Cross ER: St Vincent's Hospital (2012–2015)
- Meet the Hockers (2017 on 9Go!)
- Missing Persons Unit (2009)
- Missing Pieces (2009)
- Murder Calls Australia (2017)
- Murder, Lies & Alibis (2019)
- Ocean's Deadliest (2007)
- Operation Thailand (2017)
- Outback Wrangler (2016–2017) (originally broadcast on National Geographic in 2011)
- The Politically Incorrect Parenting Show (2010)
- Ralph TV (2007)
- Ready for Take Off (2015–2016)
- Rescue 911 (1990s)
- Royal Flying Doctor Service (2007)
- Search and Rescue (2008)
- Send in the Dogs Australia (9Gem 2011, 2013–)
- Sensing Murder (2008) (9Gem 2011–present)
- Sudden Impact (2008)
- This Is Your Life (1995–2005, 2008, 2011)
- This Time Next Year (2017, 2019)
- Trimbole: The Real Underbelly (2009)
- Trouble in Paradise (2009)
- The Waiting Room (2008)
- Weddings (10 years on Special) (2008)
- What a Year (2006–2007, now screening on GEM 2011)
- Who Killed Harold Holt? (2007)
- You Saved My Life (2009)
- Young Doctors (2011)

==== Game shows ====
- 1 vs. 100 (2007–2008)
- All About Faces (1971)
- Ampol Stamp Quiz (1964–1965)
- Bert's Family Feud (2006–2007)
- The Better Sex (1978)
- The Big Game (1966)
- Big Nine (1969–1970)
- Blankety Blanks (1985–1986, 1996)
- Burgo's Catch Phrase (1997–2001, 2002–2003)
- Cash Bonanza (2001)
- The Celebrity Game (1969)
- Celebrity Squares (1975–1976)
- Clever (2006)
- Concentration (1950s–1967)
- Crossfire (1987–1988)
- Do You Trust Your Wife? (1957–1958)
- Don't Forget Your Toothbrush (1995)
- Double Your Dollars (1965)
- Download (2000–2002)
- Fairway Fun (1960s)
- Family Feud (1978–1984)
- Fear Factor (2002)
- Ford Superquiz (1981–1982)
- Free for All (1973)
- Gambit (1974)
- The Golden Show (1960s)
- Guess What? (1992–1993)
- Happy Go Lucky (1961)
- Hole in the Wall (2008)
- Initial Reaction (Nine Network 2000)
- It Could Be You (1960–1967, 1969, 1982)
- Jackpot (1960–1961)
- Jigsaw (1960s)
- Keynotes (1964, 1992–1993)
- Let's Make a Deal (1968–1969, 1977)
- Letter Charades (1967)
- Little Aussie Battlers (1998)
- The Lucky Show (1959–1961)
- Match Mates (1981–1982)
- The Mint (2007–2008)
- The Million Dollar Drop (2011)
- Million Dollar Wheel of Fortune (2008)
- Millionaire Hot Seat (2009–2023)
- My Generation (1995–1996)
- Name That Tune (1956–1957, 1975)
- The Newlywed Game (1987)
- Now You See It (1998–1999)
- Pass the Buck (2002)
- Play Your Hunch (1962–1964)
- Power of 10 (2008)
- The Price Is Right (1958, 1993–1998, 2003–2005)
- Quizmania (2006–2007)
- Sale of the Century (1980–2001)
- Say G'day (1987)
- Say When!! (1962–1964)
- Shafted (2002)
- Show Me the Money
- The Singing Bee (2008)
- Spending Spree (1971–1976)
- Split Second (1972–1973)
- Strike It Lucky (1994)
- Supermarket Sweep (1992–1994)
- Surprise Package (1961)
- Take the Hint (1962–1966)
- Tell the Truth (1959–1965)
- Temptation (2005–2009)
- Tic-Tac-Dough (1960–1964)
- The Tommy Hanlon Show (1967–1968)
- The Weakest Link (2021–2022)
- Wheel of Fortune (1959–1962, no relation to later series of the same name)
- Who Wants to Be a Millionaire? (1999–2007)
- Who Wants to Be a Millionaire? Special Events (2021)
- Who Wants to Be a Millionaire? Whizz Kids (2010)
- Wipeout Australia (2009)

==== Children's ====
- The Adventures of Skippy (1992)
- Alice-Miranda Friends Forever (movie, 2019)
- Alice-Miranda: A Royal Christmas Ball (movie, 2021)
- Alien TV (2019–24)
- Berry Bees (2019–23)
- BrainBuzz (2018–2021)
- The Breakky Club (1990–1991)
- The Bugs Bunny and Tweety Show (1990–1992)
- Bush Beat (2008–2010)
- Buzz Bumble (2014–2017)
- Captain Flinn and the Pirate Dinosaurs (2015–2019)
- The Cartoon Company (1986–1991)
- Cartoon Corner (1971–1977)
- The C Company (1990–1991)
- Challenger (1997–1998)
- The Channel Niners' Super Cartoon Show
- C'mon Kids
- The Cool Room (2000–2001)
- Creature Mania (2018)
- Crocadoo (1996–1998)
- Crunch Time (2016–2018)
- The Curiosity Show (1972–1990)
- The Daryl and Ossie Cartoon Show (1977–1978)
- The Day My Butt Went Psycho! (2013–2019)
- Deadly (2006–2010)
- Dennis and Gnasher (2009–2017)
- Dinky Di's (1991)
- Dogstar (2006–2015)
- Don't Blame Me (2002–2003)
- The Dot and the Kangaroo films (1977–94)
- Double Trouble (2008)
- Download (2000–2002)
- Dumbotz (2019–23)
- The Eggs (2004–2009)
- Elly & Jools (1990, later aired on ABC Kids)
- Escape of the Artful Dodger
- Falcon Island (1981)
- Fanshaw & Crudnut (2017–2020)
- Flea Bitten (2012–2014)
- G2G: Got to Go (2008–2012)
- The Gamers 2037 (2020–23)
- Gasp! (2011–2013)
- The Gift (1997, sometimes shares with ABC, now screening on ABC3)
- The Girl from Tomorrow (1990)
- The Girl from Tomorrow Part II: Tomorrow's End (1993)
- Go Health (1980–1985, sometimes shares with ABC)
- Goodsports (1992–2000)
- Groovedelicious (2007–2008)
- A gURLs wURLd (2011–2013)
- Heidi (2015–2019)
- Hills End
- Holly's Heroes (2005–2009)
- Hot Science
- Hot Source (2003–2007)
- Kangaroo Creek Gang (2002)
- Ketchup: Cats Who Cook (1997–1998, originally aired on Network Ten)
- Kids' Sunday
- Kids' WB (2006–2019)
- Kitchen Whiz (2011–2016)
- KTV
- Lab Rats Challenge (2008–2011)
- Lockie Leonard (2007–2008, 2010–2013)
- Match Mates (1981–1982)
- Mortified (2006–2008, 2010)
- Most Extreme Alien Planet Earth (2017)
- Move It! (2014–2018)
- Nate Is Late (2018–2021)
- OK for Kids (1987–1989)
- The Ossie Ostrich Video Show (1984)
- Outriders (2001)
- Parallax (2004–2009)
- Pick Your Face (1999–2003)
- Pig's Breakfast (1999–2000)
- Pirate Express (2015–2021)
- Pixel Pinkie (2009–2013)
- Plucka's Place (1997)
- Professor Poopsnagle's Steam Zeppelin (1986)
- Pugwall (1989)
- Pugwall's Summer (1990–1991)
- Pyramid (2009–2015)
- Rimba's Island (1995–2002)
- The Saddle Club (2009–2012)
- The Shak (2006–2011)
- The Shapies (2002)
- Sharky's Friends (2007–2009)
- Ship to Shore (1993–1994, later airs on ABC, now airs on ABC3)
- The Skinner Boys (2014–2021)
- Skippy: Adventures in Bushtown (1998)
- Skippy the Bush Kangaroo (1966–1970)
- The Sleepover Club (2003–2008)
- Smashhdown! (2018–24)
- Snake Tales (2009–2012)
- Snobs (2003)
- Space Chickens in Space (2018–23)
- Space Nova (2021–24, shared with ABC ME)
- Spit MacPhee (1988)
- Stormworld (2009–2013)
- Streetsmartz (2005–2009)
- The Super Flying Fun Show
- Tarax Show (1957–1969)
- Timeblazers (2003–2009)
- The Toothbrush Family (1977–1999, two seasons, Season One later airs on ABC, Season Two originally airs on Network Ten)
- Wakkaville (2010–2013)
- What's Up Doc? (1991–1999)
- Wonder World! (1993–1995)
- Y? (1999–2002)
- Zoo Family (1985–1989)

==== Preschool ====
- Cushion Kids (2001–2002, 2005)
- Here's Humphrey (1965–2009)
- Hi-5 (1999–2012, 2017–2018)
- Hiccup & Sneeze (2017–2019)
- I Am Me (2020)
- Imagination Train (2015–2017)
- The Kingdom of Paramithi (2008–2010)
- New MacDonald's Farm (2004–2008)
- Surprises! (2012–2015, 2018–2020)
- Teddies (2017–2020)
- William & Sparkles' Magical Tales (2010–2017)
- Yamba's Playtime (2010–2015)

==== Music ====
- ABBAmania (2001, 2006)
- Accent on Strings (1956)
- The ARIA Music Show (2009)
- Bandstand (1958–1972)
- The Bert Newton Show (1959–1960)
- Bongo (1960, Melbourne only)
- Campfire Favourites (1956)
- Clipz (1983–1987, Brisbane only)
- Eclipse Music TV (2010–2013)
- Hillbilly Requests
- Juke Box Saturday Night
- MTV (1987–1993)
- Nine Presents (2003–2017)
- The Music Jungle (2007–2009)
- Neptune Presents (1957)
- Patrick O'Hagan Sings (1959, Melbourne only)
- Rockit (1985)
- Saturday Date (1963–1967)
- So Fresh (2003–2006)
- Wavelength

==== Sports talk ====
- Any Given Sunday (2005–2006)
- The Cricket Show (1997–2018)
- Boots N' All (2001–2005)
- The Footy Show (AFL) (1994–2019)
- The Footy Show (NRL) (1994–2018)
- The Sunday Roast (2005–2011)
- Wide World of Sports (1981–1999, 2008–2016)

==== Sports ====
- Australian rules football: AFL (2002–2006)
- Basketball: NBL (2007, 2015–2016, 2018–2019)
- Cricket: all domestic Test matches, One Day Internationals and Twenty20 Internationals (1979–2018)
- Cricket: World Series Cricket (1977–1979)
- Cycling: Tour Down Under (2012–2018)
- Horse racing: Melbourne Spring Racing Carnival (2007–2012), Autumn Racing Carnival (2007–2012)
- Rugby league: ANZAC Test (1997–2017), Rugby League World Cup (1992–2008)
- Motor racing: Formula One Australian Grand Prix (1985–2002) and Moto GP Australian motorcycle Grand Prix (1989–1996)
- Netball: Super Netball and Constellation Cup (2017–2021) on Nine/9Gem)
- Rugby union: The Rugby Championship (2011–2012), Wallabies Rugby Internationals (2011–2012), Rugby World Cup (2011, 2015)
- Soccer: FIFA World Cup (2002), International Champions Cup (2015–2016) and Socceroos World Cup Qualifiers (2016–2017 on 9Go!)
- Summer Olympic Games: London 2012
- Swimming: Pan Pacific Swimming Championships (1985–2008)
- Tennis: Fast4 Tennis (2015) and Masters Cup (2001)
- Winter Olympic Games: Vancouver 2010

==== Annual events ====
- ARIA Music Awards (2001, 2009, 2011–2013–present on 9Go!, 2017–24–2025–present)
- Schools Spectacular (2013–2015)
- TV Week Logie Awards (1959, 1964, 1966, 1968–1980, 1982, 1984, 1986, 1988, 1991, 1994, 1996–2019, 2022, Moves to Seven in 2023)

==== Lotteries ====
- NSW Lotto Draws (NSW only, 5 November 1979 – 31 December 2012) (now broadcasting only on 9Go! 1 January 2013 – present)
- Tatts Keno Draws (Victoria only, 1988–2004)

=== Foreign ===
==== News and current affairs ====
- 20/20 (1981–2007, 2009–2019)
- 48 Hours (1988, now screening on 10 Bold)
- Good Morning America (2003–2018)
- Primetime (2008)

==== Soap opera ====
- Another World (1990s)
- The Colbys (1985–1987)
- Days of Our Lives (1968–2013 on Nine, 2019–2025 on 9Gem)
- Dynasty (1981–1989)
- General Hospital (late 1980s)
- Loving (early 1980s)
- Search for Tomorrow (1951–1986)
- Titans
- The Young and the Restless (1974–2007 on Nine, 2019–2024 on 9Gem)

==== Animation ====
- Baby Blues
- Gary the Rat
- The Oblongs
- Ren & Stimpy "Adult Party Cartoon"
- Stripperella (later moved to SBS)

==== Drama ====
- 21 Jump Street (1987–1991)
- A.D. The Bible Continues (2015)
- Adventures in Rainbow Country (1970–1971)
- Arrow (9Go!)
- Another World (1964–1999)
- The Avengers (1961–1969, originally aired on ABC)
- The Baron (1966–1967)
- Bonanza (1959–1973)
- Brooklyn South (1997–1998)
- Buck Rogers in the 25th Century (1979–1981)
- Bull (2015)
- Burying Brian (2009)
- Cade's County (1971–1972)
- Captain Power and the Soldiers of the Future (1987–1988)
- Cashmere Mafia (2008)
- Charlie's Angels (1976–1981)
- Charlie's Angels (2011)
- Chase (2010)
- Chicago Justice (2017)
- China Beach (1988–1991)
- The Citadel (1983)
- City of Angels (2000)
- Close to Home (2006–2008)
- The Colbys (1985–1987)
- Cold Case (2003–2010)
- Cold Squad (1998–2005)
- Colditz (1972–1974)
- Columbo (1968–2003)
- The Commander (2009–2010, GEM 2011–2012)
- Coronation Street (1960–present)
- Crusoe (2009–2010)
- CSI: Crime Scene Investigation (2000–2015)
- CSI: Miami (2002–2012)
- CSI: NY (2004–2013)
- Damages (2007–2012)
- Danger Man (1960–1968)
- Dawson's Creek (1998–2003)
- Diagnosis: Murder (1993–2001)
- The Division (2001–2005)
- The Dukes of Hazzard (1979–1985)
- Dr. Quinn, Medicine Woman (1993–1998)
- Dynasty (1981–1989)
- Eleventh Hour (2009)
- Ellery Queen (1975–1976)
- ER (1994–2009)
- Everwood (2002–2006)
- The Evidence (2009)
- Eye to Eye (1985)
- The Fall Guy (1981–1986)
- Fantasy Island (1977–1984)
- Father Murphy (1981–1983)
- The F.B.I. (1965–1974)
- Forever (2015)
- The Fugitive (1963–1967)
- Gemini Man (1976)
- General Hospital (1963–present)
- Gideon's Way (1965–1966)
- Gilmore Girls (2001–2009)
- Gossip Girl (2008–2009, now screening on GO! 2009–2012)
- Gotham (9Go!, now on Foxtel Networks)
- Gunsmoke (1955–1975)
- Harry's Law (Nine/GEM 2011–2012)
- Hart to Hart (1979–1982)
- Hawaii Five-O (1968–1980)
- Hello Goodbye (2006)
- Hill Street Blues (1981–1987, later airs on ABC)
- The Hills (2008–2009)
- Hostages (2013)
- Houston Knights (1987–1988)
- Invasion (2008)
- Jake and the Fatman (1987–1992)
- James at 15 (1978)
- James at 16 (1978)
- John Doe (2002–2003)
- Judging Amy (1999–2005)
- Katts and Dog (1988–1993)
- Kaz (1978–1979)
- Kidnapped (2006–2007)
- Knight Rider (1982–1986)
- Kojak (1973–1978)
- Kung Fu (1972–1975)
- The Last Ship (9Go!)
- Law & Order True Crime
- Level 9 (2000–2001)
- Lethal Weapon (2017–2019)
- Lifestories: Families in Crisis (1992–1996)
- Little House on the Prairie (1974–1983)
- Lou Grant (1977–1982)
- Major Crimes (9Gem)
- Malibu (1983)
- Man From Atlantis (1978)
- Manions of America (1981)
- Mannix (1967–1975)
- Matlock (1986–1995)
- McCloud (1970–1977)
- Medicine Ball (1995)
- Men in Trees (2006–2008)
- The Mentalist (2008–2015)
- Miami Vice (1984–1990)
- Mission: Impossible (1966–1973)
- Mission: Impossible (1988–1990)
- Moonlight (2007–2008)
- Moonlighting (1985–1989)
- Murder, She Wrote (1985–1996)
- My Friend Flicka (1956–1957)
- The Mysteries of Laura
- The New Mike Hammer (1986–1987)
- The Nine (2006–2007)
- Nip/Tuck (2003–2010)
- Ohara (1987–1988)
- Outrageous Fortune (2006–2007, now screening on TEN)
- A Peaceable Kingdom (1989)
- Pensacola: Wings of Gold (1997–2000)
- Perry Mason (1957–1966)
- Petrocelli (1974–1976)
- Peyton Place (1964–1969)
- Poldark (1975–1977)
- Police Story (1973–1978)
- Police Woman (1974–1978)
- Prehistoric Park (2006; GO! 2012–present)
- Prime Suspect (2011)
- Prince Regent (1979)
- Remington Steele (1982–1987)
- Rizzoli & Isles (9Gem)
- Robin of Sherwood (1984–1986)
- Rome (2005–2007)
- Room 222 (1969–1974)
- Roots (1977)
- Roswell (1999–2002)
- Runaway (2006)
- Sam (1978)
- The Sandbaggers (1978–1980)
- Search for Tomorrow (1951–1986)
- Seaway (1965–1966)
- Shades of Darkness (1983–1986)
- Sherlock (2011–2012)
- Six Feet Under (2001–2005)
- Smallville (2002–2004, later moved to Network Ten and Eleven)
- Smith (2006–2007)
- The Sopranos (1999–2007)
- Spenser: For Hire (1985–1988)
- Stalker (2015)
- Star Trek (1966–1969)
- Star Trek: Deep Space Nine (1993–1999)
- Star Trek: Enterprise (2001–2005)
- Star Trek: The Next Generation (1987–1994)
- Star Trek: Voyager (1995–2001)
- Starsky & Hutch (1975–1979)
- Studio 60 on the Sunset Strip (2007)
- St. Elsewhere (1982–1988)
- Superboy (1988–1992)
- S.W.A.T. (1975–1976)
- Taken
- Tales of the Unexpected (1979–1988)
- Tales of Wells Fargo (1957–1962)
- Terminator: The Sarah Connor Chronicles (2008) (previously on GO! 2009–2010)
- Third Watch (1999–2005)
- Today's F.B.I. (1981–1982)
- Touched by an Angel (1994–2003)
- Tucker's Witch (1982)
- Unforgettable (2011–2016)
- Upstairs, Downstairs (1971–1975)
- V (1983)
- V (2010, GO! 2010–2012)
- Vega$ (1978–1981)
- The Virginian (1962–1971)
- Voyage to the Bottom of the Sea (1964–1968)
- Wagon Train (1957–1965)
- Waking the Dead (2000–2011)
- Walker, Texas Ranger (1993–2001)
- Walking Tall (1981)
- The West Wing (2000–2005, later moved to ABC)
- The Wire (2002–2008)
- Wiseguy (1987–1990)
- Without a Trace (2002–2009)
- Wonderfalls (2004)

==== Comedy ====
- 2 Broke Girls (2011–2017)
- The Addams Family (1964–1966)
- ALF (1986–1990)
- Alice (1976–1985)
- All of Us (2003–2007)
- The Andy Griffith Show (1960–1968)
- Anger Management (2012–2014)
- Angie (1979–1980)
- As Time Goes By (1992–2002)
- Baby Bob (2002–2003)
- Balls of Steel (2008)
- Barney Miller (1975–1982)
- Benson (1979–1986)
- The Bernie Mac Show (2001–2006)
- Better Together (2010)
- Bewitched (1964–1972)
- The Big Bang Theory (2007–2019)
- The Big C (2010–2013)
- Billy (1992)
- The Bob Newhart Show (1972–1978)
- The Brady Bunch (1969–1974)
- Can't Hurry Love (1995–1996)
- The Carol Burnett Show (1967–1978)
- Caroline in the City (1995–1999)
- The Charmings (1987–1988)
- Cheers (1982–1993)
- City (1990)
- The Cosby Show (1984–1992)
- Curb Your Enthusiasm (2000–2010)
- Cybill (1995–1998)
- The Danny Thomas Show (1953–1957)
- Dave's World (1993–1997)
- Dennis the Menace (1959–1963)
- Designing Women (1986–1993)
- Diagnosis: Murder (1993–2001)
- The Dick Van Dyke Show (1961–1966)
- Diff'rent Strokes (1978–1986)
- The Donna Reed Show (1958–1966)
- The Drew Carey Show (1995–2004)
- The Duck Factory (1984)
- The Edge (1992–1993)
- Empire (1984)
- Episodes (2011–2015, Now on ABC2)
- Eve (2003–2006)
- Family Affair (1966–1971)
- Family Matters (1989–1998)
- Family Ties (1983–1989)
- The Famous Teddy Z (1989–1990)
- Father Ted (1995–1998)
- Fay (1975–1976)
- Foley Square (1985–1986)
- For Your Love (1998–2002)
- Frank's Place (1987–1988)
- Frasier (1993–2004)
- Free Spirit (1989–1990)
- The Fresh Prince of Bel-Air (1990–1996)
- Friends (1994–2004)
- Full House (1987–1995)
- George Lopez (2002–2007)
- Gilligan's Island (1964–1967)
- Gilmore Girls (2001–2009)
- Gloria (1982–1983)
- Green Acres (1965–1971)
- The Gregory Hines Show (1997–1998)
- Growing Pains (1985–1992)
- Happy Days (1974–1984)
- Head of the Class (1986–1991)
- Here's Lucy (1968–1974)
- Hogan's Heroes (1965–1971)
- Hot in Cleveland (2010–2015)
- The Hughleys (1998–2002)
- I Dream of Jeannie (1965–1970)
- I Love Lucy (1951–1957)
- Ink (1996–1997)
- It's a Living (1980–1989)
- The Jack Benny Program (1950–1965)
- Jennifer Slept Here (1983–1984)
- Joey (2004–2006)
- Just Shoot Me! (2008–2009)
- Just the Ten of Us (1988–1990)
- Kevin Can Wait (2016–2018)
- Kids Say the Darndest Things (1995, 1998–2000)
- The King of Queens (1999–2007)
- Ladies' Men (1980–1981)
- Laverne & Shirley (1976–1983)
- Leave It to Beaver (1957–1963)
- Like Family (2003–2004)
- Little Britain (2009)
- Living Dolls (1989)
- Living with Fran (2005–2006)
- Love & War (1992–1995)
- The Love Boat (1977–1986)
- The Lucy Show (1962–1968)
- Mad TV (1995–2009)
- Malcolm in the Middle (2001–2005)
- Margie (1961–1962)
- Married... with Children (1987–1997)
- The Mary Tyler Moore Show (1970–1977)
- Maude (1972–1978)
- McHale's Navy (1962–1966)
- McMeego (1997)
- The Middle (2009–2018)
- Mike and Molly (2010–2016)
- Mork & Mindy (1978–1982)
- Mr. Merlin (1981–1982)
- The Muppet Show (1976–1981)
- Murphy Brown (1988–1998, Now on Ten)
- My Brother's Keeper (1975–1976)
- My Favorite Martian (1963–1966)
- My Sister Sam (1986–1988)
- My Three Sons (1965–1972)
- My Two Dads (1987–1990)
- The Nanny (2007–2009)
- Nanny and the Professor (1970–1971)
- The New Adventures of Old Christine (2006–2012)
- The New Odd Couple (1982–1983)
- Newhart (1982–1990)
- Nikki (2000–2002)
- The Norm Show (1999–2001)
- The Odd Couple (1970–1975)
- Off the Rack (1984–1985)
- One on One (2001–2006)
- The Parkers (1999–2004)
- Partners (Nine/GEM, 2014)
- The Partridge Family (1970–1974)
- Perfect Strangers (1986–1993)
- Reno 911!
- Reggie (1983)
- Rhoda (1974–1978)
- Rock Me Baby (2003–2004)
- Room for Two (1992–1993)
- Run of the House (2003–2004)
- Sanford and Son (1972–1977)
- Seinfeld (1993, pilot episode only and later moved to Channel Ten at the end of the year)
- Sex and the City (1998–2004)
- Six Feet Under (2001–2005)
- Sledge Hammer! (1987–1988)
- Small Wonder (1985–1989)
- Spin City (1996–2002)
- Spitting Image (1984–1996)
- Sports Disasters
- Step by Step (1991–1997)
- Suddenly Susan (1996–2000)
- Taxi (1978–1983)
- Teech (1991)
- The Greatest American Hero (1982–1983)
- 'Til Death (2006–2010)
- Tucker (2000)
- Two and a Half Men (2004–2015)
- Undateable (2014–2016)
- Undeclared (2001–2002)
- The Upper Hand (1990–1996)
- Veronica's Closet (1997–2000)
- Vinny and Bobby (1992)
- Viva Laughlin (2007)
- The Wackiest Ship in the Army (1965–1966)
- Wanda at Large (2003)
- We Got It Made (1984–1988)
- Webster (1983–1989)
- Weeds (2005–2012)
- Welcome Back, Kotter (1975–1979)
- What I Like About You (2002–2006)
- Who's the Boss? (1984–1992)
- Whose Line Is It Anyway? (1998–2006)
- Wings (1990–1997)
- WKRP in Cincinnati (1978–1982)

==== Variety / entertainment ====
- The Ananda Lewis Show (1990s–2001)
- Dr. Phil (2002–2007, moved to 10)
- The Ellen DeGeneres Show (2008–2021)
- Entertainment Tonight (1981–2012, moved to 10)
- Extra (2012–2019)
- Late Show with David Letterman (1993–2006, moved to 10)
- Lip Sync Battle (2016–2020, Now on 10 Shake)
- The Martin Short Show (1999–2000)
- The View (2008–2013)
- Noel's House Party (1990s)

==== Reality ====
- American Idol (Season 18, 2020)
- American Ninja Warrior (Originally in 2010–2017 on SBS, 2018–2020 on 9Go!)
- The Apprentice (2004–2006)
- The Bachelor (2002–2007) (GO! 2009, 2012)
- Britain's Got Talent (2015–2018, moved to Seven)
- Dance Your Ass Off (GO!, 2009)
- The F Word (2008)
- Girls of the Playboy Mansion (2007–2008)
- Hell's Kitchen (2007–2008)
- Ladette to Lady (2008)
- Neighbours at War (2007)
- Paradise Hotel
- Ramsay's Kitchen Nightmares (2007–2010, moved to Seven)
- Secret Millionaire (2008)
- Supernanny (2005–2008)
- Superstars of Dance (2009–2010)
- The Truth About Food (2007–2008)
- Top Gear (2009–2020 on Nine/9Go!, 2020–2023 on 9Rush)
- Victoria Beckham: Coming to America (2007)
- The Voice Kids U.K (2017–2018)
- Wife Swap (2007–2008) (GO! 2009–2010, GEM 201–2011)
- World of Dance (2018)

==== Lifestyle ====
- Bargain Hunt (2007–2008, now screening on 7TWO)
- Body Work
- Extreme Makeover (2002–2007)
- Wine Me, Dine Me (2007)
- You Are What You Eat (2004–2007)

==== Observational / documentaries ====
- The Agency (2001–2003)
- Airline (2006–2008)
- Airport (1996–2008)
- Deadly Surf (2007–2008)
- Emergency (2008)
- Frozen Planet II
- Hot Pursuit (2010)
- i-Caught (2007)
- Life in Cold Blood (2008)
- Embarrassing Bodies
- Mortal Kombat: Konquest (1998–1999)
- Motorway Patrol (2001–2010, Now on Seven)
- Planet Earth III (2024)
- Police Ten 7 (2006–2008)
- Richard Hammond's Invisible Worlds (2010)
- A Year with the Royal Family (2008)
- Who Do You Think You Are?

==== Game shows ====
- Banzai
- The Cube (2010, now airs on GO! 2012–)
- Eggheads (9Gem 2016–2017)
- The Moment of Truth (2008)
- Wipeout (2008) (GO! 2009–2012, later on 7mate)

==== Anthology ====
- Disneyland
- The Wonderful World of Disney (2019–2020, moving to Disney+ in 2020)

==== Children's ====
- 8 Man
- Ace Ventura: Pet Detective
- Adventure Time (2011–2021)
- The Adventures of Batman & Robin
- Adventures of the Little Koala
- The Adventures of Noddy
- The Adventures of Rin Tin Tin
- The Adventures of Super Mario Bros. 3
- The Adventures of Twizzle (Victoria only, usually airs on Seven Network in New South Wales)
- The Amazing 3
- The Amazing Chan and the Chan Clan (later aired on Seven Network)
- The Amazing World of Gumball (2014–2023)
- Animaniacs (later aired on GO!)
- The Archie Show
- Ark II
- Astro Boy (1960s version except Melbourne)
- Bakugan
- Bakugan: Battle Planet
- Bakugan: Armored Alliance
- Bakugan: Geogan Rising
- Bakugan: Evolutions
- Bakugan: Legends
- Barbie Dreamhouse Adventures
- Barbie Dreamtopia
- Baby Looney Tunes
- Baggy Pants and the Nitwits
- Bailey's Comets
- The Baker Street Boys
- Ballet Shoes
- The Bang Shang Lollapalooza Show
- The Barkleys
- The Batman
- Batman: The Animated Series
- Batman: The Brave and the Bold
- The Beagles
- Beakman's World (shares with Network Ten)
- The Beatles
- Be Cool, Scooby-Doo! (2016–2019)
- Beetlejuice
- Ben 10 (2005 series)
- Ben 10 (2016 series) (2017–2019)
- Ben 10: Alien Force
- Ben 10: Omniverse
- Ben 10: Ultimate Alien
- Beware the Batman
- Beyblade Burst (2016–2024 on 9Go!)
- Big Blue Marble
- Big John, Little John
- Bimble's Bucket
- Birdman and the Galaxy Trio (later aired on Seven Network)
- The Biskitts
- The Book Tower
- The Box of Delights
- The Bozo Show
- Brambly Hedge (later aired on ABC)
- BraveStarr
- Buford and the Galloping Ghost
- The Bugs Bunny Show (sometimes shares with Seven Network and Network Ten)
- Camp Lazlo
- Captain America
- The Care Bears Movie
- The Care Bears Movie II: A New Generation
- Care Bears: Unlock the Magic
- Cartoon All-Stars to the Rescue (Simulcast with Seven Network and Network Ten)
- Casper the Friendly Ghost
- Challenge of the GoBots (only airs on Nine in Adelaide, usually airs on Seven Network)
- The Charlie Brown and Snoopy Show (later aired on ABC)
- Chucklewood Critters
- Clarence
- Classic Looney Tunes
- Clue Club (later aired on Seven Network)
- Codename: Kids Next Door (later aired on Nine HD and GO!, also airs on Seven Network in Perth)
- Cool McCool
- C.O.P.S. (later aired on Network Ten)
- Courage the Cowardly Dog
- Courageous Cat and Minute Mouse
- Crusader Rabbit
- Daktari
- Dastardly and Muttley in Their Flying Machines (later aired on Network Ten and Seven Network)
- Denver, the Last Dinosaur
- Deputy Dawg
- Devlin
- Dexter's Laboratory (originally aired on Seven Network)
- The Dick Tracy Show
- Dingbat and the Creeps
- Digimon Fusion
- Dinky Dog
- Dinosaucers
- Dynomutt, Dog Wonder (later aired on Seven Network)
- Ed, Edd n Eddy (originally aired on Seven Network)
- The Edison Twins
- Electric Eskimo
- Elephant Boy
- Fabulous Funnies
- The Famous Adventures of Mr. Magoo
- Fanboy & Chum Chum
- The Fantastic Voyages of Sinbad the Sailor
- The Flintstones (1960–1966)
- Follyfoot
- The Fonz and the Happy Days Gang
- Freakazoid!
- Free Willy
- The Funky Phantom (later aired on Seven Network)
- The Funny Company
- Galaxy Goof-Ups
- Garfield Specials
- The Gary Coleman Show
- Gazula the Amicable Monster
- Gentle Ben
- The Ghost Busters
- Go Go Gophers
- The Great Grape Ape Show (later aired on Seven Network)
- The Grim Adventures of Billy & Mandy
- Grimm's Fairy Tale Classics
- Groovie Ghoulies (shares with Seven Network and Network Ten)
- Gumby (later aired on Seven Network and ABC)
- H.R. Pufnstuf
- The Hallo Spencer Show
- The Harlem Globetrotters
- The Harveytoons Show
- Heathcliff
- Heckle and Jeckle
- Help!... It's the Hair Bear Bunch!
- The Herculoids (later aired on Seven Network)
- Here Come the Double Deckers
- Hero High
- Hey Vern, It's Ernest!
- Heyyy, It's the King!
- Hi Hi Puffy AmiYumi
- Histeria!
- Hong Kong Phooey (later aired on Seven Network)
- Hoppity Hooper
- Hot Wheels
- Hound Town
- The Houndcats
- Huckleberry Hound (usually airs on Seven Network in Victoria, sometimes airs on Nine in Sydney)
- Inch High, Private Eye (later aired on Seven Network)
- The Incredible Hulk
- Jabberjaw (later aired on Seven Network)
- Jana of the Jungle
- Jason of Star Command
- Johnny Bravo (originally aired on Seven Network)
- Johnny Cypher in Dimension Zero
- Johnny Test
- Josie and the Pussycats (later aired on Seven Network)
- Josie and the Pussycats in Outer Space (later aired on Seven Network)
- Jungle Beat
- Justice League
- Justice League Action
- Justice League Unlimited
- The Karate Kid
- Kidd Video
- The King Kong Show
- King Leonardo and His Short Subjects (originally aired on ABC)
- Korg: 70,000 B.C.
- The Krofft Supershow
- Lancelot Link, Secret Chimp
- Laverne & Shirley in the Army
- The Legend of Zelda
- Lego City
- Lego City Adventures
- Lego Marvel Super Heroes (2019)
- Lego Nexo Knights
- Lidsville
- The Life and Times of Juniper Lee
- The Littlest Hobo
- Littlest Pet Shop
- Littlest Pet Shop: A World of Our Own
- Lippy the Lion
- The Littles (later aired on Network Ten)
- The Lone Ranger
- The Looney Tunes Show
- The Lost Saucer
- Magilla Gorilla (originally aired on Network Ten as Channel 0, later aired on Seven Network)
- Marine Boy (later aired on Network Ten)
- Marvel's Avengers Assemble (2019)
- The Marvel Super Heroes
- M.A.S.K. (later aired on Network Ten)
- Meatballs & Spaghetti
- Mega Man: Fully Charged
- Merrie Melodies (shared with Seven Network and Network Ten)
- The Mickey Mouse Club (usually airs on Seven Network)
- The Mighty Hercules
- Mighty Mouse
- Mighty Mouse: The New Adventures
- Mighty Mouse Playhouse
- Mike, Lu & Og
- Milton the Monster (later aired on Network Ten)
- Moby Dick and Mighty Mightor
- Monchhichis
- Monsuno
- Mork & Mindy/Laverne & Shirley/Fonz Hour
- The Mouse Factory
- Mr. Magoo
- ¡Mucha Lucha!
- Muggsy
- The Mumbly Cartoon Show (later aired on Seven Network)
- My Gym Partner's a Monkey
- My Little Pony 'n Friends
- My Little Pony: Friendship Is Magic
- The New Adventures of Mighty Mouse and Heckle & Jeckle
- The New Adventures of Superman
- The New Adventures of Zorro
- The New Archie and Sabrina Hour
- The New Archies (later aired on Network Ten)
- The New Casper Cartoon Show
- New Looney Tunes
- The New Mickey Mouse Club (usually airs on Seven Network)
- The New Scooby-Doo Movies (later aired on Seven Network)
- The Oddball Couple
- Ox Tales
- Ozzy & Drix
- Pandamonium
- The Paper Lads
- Peanuts specials (later aired on ABC)
- Regal Academy
- The Perils of Penelope Pitstop
- Phantoma
- The Pink Panther (usually airs on Network Ten, airs on Nine in Brisbane, later aired on Seven Network)
- Pinky and the Brain (later aired on GO!)
- Pinky, Elmyra & the Brain
- Police Academy: The Animated Series
- Polly Pocket
- Popeye the Sailor
- Popples
- The Porky Pig Show (sometimes shares with Seven Network and Network Ten)
- The Powerpuff Girls (2016 series)
- Power Rangers Samurai
- Power Rangers Super Samurai
- Power Rangers Megaforce
- Power Rangers Super Megaforce
- Power Rangers Dino Charge
- Power Rangers Super Dino Charge
- Power Rangers Ninja Steel
- Power Rangers Super Ninja Steel
- Power Rangers Beast Morphers
- Power Rangers Dino Fury
- Prince Planet
- The Princess and the Goblin
- Quick Draw McGraw (usually airs on Seven Network in Victoria, sometimes airs on Nine in Sydney)
- Rabbids Invasion
- Regal Academy
- Regular Show (2012–2020)
- The Real Ghostbusters (originally aired on Network Ten)
- Richie Rich
- Road Rovers
- The Road Runner Show (sometimes shares with Seven Network)
- Robotech (airs on Nine only in Adelaide, usually airs on Network Ten, later aired on Seven Network)
- Rocky and Bullwinkle (later aired on ABC)
- The Ruff and Reddy Show (also airs on Seven Network)
- Saban's Adventures of the Little Mermaid
- Saban’s Gulliver’s Travels
- Samurai Jack
- Sammy's Super T-Shirt
- Scooby and Scrappy-Doo (later aired on Seven Network)
- Scooby-Doo! Mystery Incorporated
- The Scooby-Doo Show (later aired on Seven Network)
- Scooby-Doo, Where Are You! (later aired on Seven Network)
- Scooby's All-Star Laff-A-Lympics (later aired on Seven Network)
- The Secret Lives of Waldo Kitty (originally aired on Network Ten)
- Secret Mountain Fort Awesome
- The Secrets of Isis
- Shaggy & Scooby-Doo Get a Clue! (2009–2010)
- Shazzan (later aired on Seven Network)
- Sheep in the Big City
- Sherlock Hound
- Siegfried & Roy: Masters of the Impossible
- Sigmund and the Sea Monsters
- The Skatebirds (later aired on Seven Network)
- Sky Pirates
- Slimer! and the Real Ghostbusters
- Snacker
- Snorks (only airs on Nine in Adelaide, usually airs on Seven Network)
- Sonic Boom
- Space Academy
- Space Ace
- Space Angel
- Space Ghost (sometimes airs on Network Ten, later aired on Seven Network)
- The Space Kidettes (later aired on Seven Network)
- Space Sentinels
- Spider-Man
- SpongeBob SquarePants (2015–17, now on 10 Shake)
- Sport Billy
- Spunky and Tadpole
- Star Trek: The Animated Series (1973–1974)
- Star Wars: Droids (only airs on Nine in Perth, usually airs on Network Ten)
- Star Wars Rebels (2019)
- Static Shock
- Steven Universe
- The Super Mario Bros. Super Show!
- Super Mario World
- Supergran
- Superman (1988)
- Superman: The Animated Series
- Superwitch
- The Sylvester & Tweety Mysteries
- Tales of the Wizard of Oz
- Tangled: The Series (2019)
- Taz-Mania
- Teen Titans
- Teen Titans Go! (2014–2025)
- Teen Wolf
- Tennessee Tuxedo and His Tales
- These Are the Days
- Thunderbirds (1965–1966)
- Thunderbirds Are Go (shared with ABC ME)
- ThunderCats (1985) (only airs on Nine in Adelaide, usually airs on Seven Network in Sydney (first aired on Seven in Sydney and other states in 1986 and later in Victoria in 1989) and Network Ten in Victoria from 1987 to 1988)
- ThunderCats (2011) (later aired on GO!)
- Time Squad
- Tiny Toon Adventures
- The Tom and Jerry Show (2014) (2014–2025)
- Tom and Jerry Tales
- Toonsylvania
- Tom Terrific (sometimes airs on Seven Network in Victoria)
- Top Cat (later aired on Seven Network and GO!, airs on Network Ten in Adelaide)
- Touché Turtle and Dum Dum (sometimes airs on Seven Network in Victoria)
- Transformers: Cyberverse
- Transformers: Prime
- Turning Mecard (2017–2019)
- Uncle Croc's Block (sometimes shares with Seven Network)
- Uncle Grandpa
- Valley of the Dinosaurs
- Wacky Races (later aired on Network Ten and Seven Network)
- Wally Gator
- Walt Disney's Mickey and Donald
- We Bare Bears
- What's New, Scooby-Doo?
- Where's Huddles?
- Wild West C.O.W.-Boys of Moo Mesa
- Wishbone
- Woody Woodpecker
- Woof! (later aired on ABC and 7TWO)
- The World of Strawberry Shortcake
- Wowser
- X-Men: Evolution
- Xiaolin Showdown
- The X's
- Yogi's Space Race
- Yo-kai Watch (2015–2018)
- Young Justice (2012–2019)
- Yu-Gi-Oh!
- Yu-Gi-Oh! Arc-V (2015–2019)
- Yu-Gi-Oh! Sevens
- Yu-Gi-Oh! VRAINS (2019–2021)
- Yu-Gi-Oh! Zexal (2014–2017, 9Go!)
- The Zeta Project

==== Preschool ====
- The Backyardigans (2004–10)
- Barney & Friends (1994–97)
- Blue's Clues
- Bubble Guppies (2012–14, moved to 10 Shake)
- Clifford the Big Red Dog
- Dora the Explorer (2000–18, moved to 10 Shake)
- Go, Diego, Go! (2005–10)
- Jack's Big Music Show (2005–14)
- Jay Jay the Jet Plane (1998–2005)
- Kate & Mim-Mim
- Little Charmers
- Little Red Tractor (2004–07)
- The Lion Guard (2019)
- Make Way for Noddy (2002–07)
- Mickey and the Roadster Racers (2019)
- Paw Patrol (2014–20, shared with 10 Shake)
- Percy the Park Keeper (later aired on ABC)
- Playbox
- Puppy Dog Pals (2019)
- Rainbow (also airs on Seven Network and Network Ten)
- Rainbow Rangers
- Rev & Roll
- Ricky Zoom (2020–22)
- Robocar Poli
- Sofia the First (2019)
- Spidey and His Amazing Friends (2021)
- Sunny Bunnies
- Super Wings
- Team Umizoomi (2012, moved to 10 Shake)
- Transformers: Rescue Bots
- Transformers: Rescue Bots Academy
- Vampirina (2019)

==== Sports ====
- American football: NFL including Super Bowl (early 1990s–mid 1990s)
- Baseball: Major League Baseball including World Series (1980s–1990s, 2014)
- Motor racing: A1 Grand Prix (2009), Formula One International races (1980–2002) and Moto GP (1987–1996)

==== Annual events ====
- Academy Awards (now on Seven)

==== Religious ====
- Kenneth Copeland
- Life Today with James Robison (Shared with Network Ten, now on 7flix)

==== Other ====
- Beyond with James Van Praagh
- Body Doubles
- Farscape
- Look Who's Talking
- Mortal Kombat: Konquest
- The Samurai
- The Three Stooges

== See also ==
- List of programs broadcast by ABC (Australian TV network)
- List of programs broadcast by Network 10
- List of programs broadcast by Special Broadcasting Service
- List of programs broadcast by Seven Network
- List of Australian television series
