= List of Australian television series premieres in 2009 =

This is a list of Australian domestic television series which debuted, or are scheduled to debut, in 2009.

== Premieres ==
=== Free-to-air television ===
Program	Network	Debut date
Desperately Seeking Doctors	SBS TV	6 January
Carla Cametti PD	SBS TV	8 January
Chainsaw	SBS TV	27 January
Australia's Greatest Athlete	Nine Network	31 January
Today on Sunday	Nine Network	1 February
Wipeout Australia	Nine Network	3 February
Bondi Vet	Network Ten	5 February
In the Bush with Malcolm Douglas	Seven Network	7 February
The All In Call	Seven HD	8 February
Sunday Night	Seven Network	8 February
Triple Zero Heroes	Seven Network	8 February
The World Game: Extra Time	SBS TV	10 February
Gangs of Oz	Seven Network	11 February
Aussie Ladette to Lady	Nine Network	16 February
Guerrilla Gardeners	Network Ten	18 February
The Cut	ABC1	23 February
Alive and Cooking (Note: Alive and Cooking was originally only broadcast on the regional broadcastor WIN Television, but from 16 March it began to screen in capital cities on the Nine Network)	Nine Network	16 March
Beyond the Darklands	Seven Network	18 March
Zigby	ABC1	25 March
Lawrence Leung's Choose Your Own Adventure	ABC1	25 March
One Week at a Time	One	30 March
Thursday Night Live	One	2 April
Monster Auditions	SBS TV	4 April
Fanging It	ABC2	6 April
Figaro Pho	ABC1	7 April
AFHV: World’s Funniest Videos (Note: AFHV: World’s Funniest Videos was placed on hiatus after three episodes.)	Nine Network	7 April
The WotWots	ABC1	16 April
Dirt Game	ABC1	19 April
Millionaire Hot Seat	Nine Network	20 April
Missing Pieces	Nine Network	20 April
You Saved My Life (Note: You Saved My Life was formerly known as Everyday Heroes during production)	Nine Network	20 April
10 Years Younger in 10 Days	Seven Network	21 April
Second Chance	Nine Network	26 April
MasterChef Australia	Network Ten	27 April
12 Canoes	ABC1	3 May
Nine News: Late News	Nine Network	4 May
Recruits	Network Ten	4 May
Talkin' 'Bout Your Generation (Note: Talkin' 'Bout Your Generation was formerly known as Talkin' 'bout My Generation and My Gen during production)	Network Ten	5 May
homeMADE (Note: homeMADE was formerly known as Home Run during production)	Nine Network	10 May
TAC Cup Future Stars	Nine Network	10 May
Dave in the Life	SBS TV	11 May
Food Investigators	SBS TV	20 May
The Squiz	SBS TV	23 May
New Idea TV	Seven Network	1 June
Guide to the Good Life	Seven Network	6 June
Random Acts of Kindness	Nine Network	14 June
Trouble in Paradise	Nine Network	25 June
Nine News: Early Saturday Morning News	Nine Network	27 June
Nine News: Early Sunday Morning News	Nine Network	28 June
This Afternoon (Note: This Afternoon was axed after 12 episodes.)	Nine Network	29 June
Air Ways	Seven Network	14 July
Empire Fight Night	One	16 July
The 7pm Project	Network Ten	20 July
Australia's Perfect Couple (Note: Australia's Perfect Couple was formerly known as Here Come the Newlyweds and For Richer or Poorer during production.)	Nine Network	22 July
The World's Strictest Parents	Seven Network	22 July
Double Take	Seven Network	23 July
TV Burp	Seven Network	23 July
Next Wave	Network Ten	2 August
Rescue: Special Ops (Note: Rescue: Special Ops was formerly known as Rescue and Rescue Squad during production.)	Nine Network	2 August
Once Bitten	SBS One	6 August
ADbc	SBS One	27 August
Costa's Garden Odyssey	SBS One	27 August
My Family Feast	SBS One	27 August
Pixel Pinkie	Nine Network	29 August
Pyramid	Nine Network	1 September
Money for Jam	Nine Network	2 September
Snake Tales	Nine Network	5 September
The Spearman Experiment	Network Ten	8 September
Beached Az	ABC2	10 September
The Urban Monkey	ABC2	14 September
Last Chance Surgery	Seven Network	15 September
Highway Patrol	Seven Network	21 September
The Poker Star	One	26 September
The Apprentice Australia	Nine Network	28 September
Hungry Beast (formerly known as Project Next)	ABC1	30 September
Celebrity MasterChef Australia	Network Ten	30 September
Pearlie	Network Ten	September
Beauty and the Geek Australia	Seven Network	8 October
The Secret Millionaire	Nine Network	8 October
Great Aussie Cook-Off	Nine Network	11 October
The Pursuit	Nine Network	11 October
Luke Nguyen's Vietnam	SBS One	15 October
John Safran's Race Relations	ABC1	21 October
The Pro Shop	One	27 October
Electric Dreams	Network Ten	1 November
Demetri's Castle	SBS One	5 November
The F Word	7Two	6 November
Jail Birds (formerly known as Prison Sings)	ABC1	17 November
Secrets and Lives	SBS One	3 December
Baby Antonio's Circus	ABC2	4 December
CJ the DJ	ABC3	4 December
Dirtgirlworld	ABC2	4 December
My Place	ABC3	4 December
News on 3	ABC3	4 December
Prank Patrol	ABC3	4 December
No Leave, No Life	Seven Network	5 December
Rush TV	ABC3	5 December
No Way San Jose: Cocktails in Costa Rica	ABC2	9 December
Bush Slam	ABC1	29 December
The Animation Projects	ABC3	Still to debut
Studio 3	ABC3	Still to debut
After School Care	ABC3	Still to debut
West Coast Kids	ABC3	Still to debut
Dead Normal	ABC3	Still to debut
Kids Music	ABC3	Still to debut
ABC2 Live Presents	ABC2	Still to debut
Anatomy	ABC1	Still to debut
Drugs, Death and Betrayal	ABC1	Still to debut
Lightning City (Note: Lightning City remains unaired from 2007)	ABC1	Still to debut
Australia's Hidden Genius	Network Ten	Still to debut
Undercover Boss	Network Ten	Still to debut
This Week in Shorts	Network Ten	Still to debut
Junior MasterChef Australia	Network Ten	Still to debut (2010)
ICU	Seven Network	Still to debut
New game show (title unknown)	Seven Network	Still to debut
My Kitchen Rules	Seven Network	Still to debut
Damage Control	Seven Network	Still to debut (2010)
24 Hours	Nine Network	Still to debut
Let's Make a Deal	Nine Network	Still to debut
Chatroom Chicks	Nine Network	Still to debut
Desperate Measures	Nine Network	Still to debut
Local Gordon Ramsay series (title unknown)	Nine Network	Still to debut
Local Heroes	Nine Network	Still to debut
Seven Deadly Sins	Nine Network	Still to debut
Stay of Execution	Nine Network	Still to debut
Stormworld	Nine Network	Still to debut
Big in Japan	Nine Network	Still to debut
Born to Be Wild	Nine Network	Still to debut
Extraordinary Animals	Nine Network	Still to debut
First and Last	Nine Network	Still to debut
Heads or Tails	Nine Network	Still to debut
Loveland	Nine Network	Still to debut
Twist and Shout	Nine Network	Still to debut

==== Nine Network ====
Date	Program
1 February	Today - Weekend Edition: Sunday
20 April	Missing Pieces
2 May	Today - Weekend Edition: Saturday

==== SBS One ====
Date	Program
Still to debut	Parole
Still to debut	Bogans
Still to debut	Law and Disorder
Still to debut	Dusty
Still to debut	The Next Great Leader (A local version of Canada's Next Great Prime Minister)
Still to debut	Heirlooms (unaired from 2007)

=== Community television ===
Program	Network	Debut date
Histrionics	TVS	21 May 2009
The Invisible, Inaudible Family	C31 Melbourne	13 June 2009
Milli Milli Nganka	NITV	3 July 2009
Letterbox Pro	NITV	4 July 2009
Culture Warriors	NITV	5 July 2009
Grounded Exposed	NITV	7 July 2009
Marngrook in Sydney	NITV	9 July 2009
Intunes	NITV	16 July 2009
Cheap Thrills	Channel 31	Still to debut

=== Subscription television ===
Program	Network	Debut date
Camp Rock the Tasman	Disney Channel	2 January 2009
The Beach Crew	FOX8	3 January 2009
The Phone	FOX8	19 January 2009
The Go Show	Nickelodeon	23 January 2009
Bill's Holiday	The LifeStyle Channel	12 February 2009
B430	Channel [V]	11 March 2009
The Pam Ann Show	The Comedy Channel	11 March 2009
NRL Tactics	FOX Sports	17 March 2009
My First Gig	MAX	13 April 2009
Lush House	The LifeStyle Channel	27 April 2009
Flickerfest 2009	Movie Extra	15 May 2009
Whatever Happened to That Guy?	The Comedy Channel	25 May 2009
Punch TV	Sky News Australia	13 August 2009
Garden Angels	The LifeStyle Channel	3 September 2009
30 Seconds	The Comedy Channel	7 September 2009
The Jesters	Movie Extra	8 September 2009
Tangle	Showcase	1 October 2009
Andre Rieu's Australian Adventure	Ovation Channel	4 December 2009
Bridget Goddess	Nickelodeon	Still to debut
The Contender Australia	FOX8	Still to debut
Jason and the Residents	The Comedy Channel	Still to debut
My Girlfriend's Secret Hidden Camera TV Show	The Comedy Channel	Still to debut
Shear Genius	Unknown	Still to debut

Date	Program	Channel
10 October	Stefano's Cooking Paradiso	LifeStyle Food
2 November	The Contender Australia	FOX8
3 November	Sarah Murdoch presents Pride of Australia	Arena
Still to debut	Ultimate School Musical: Fame	FOX8
Still to debut	NRL Dream	Fox Sports
Still to debut	Grand Designs Australia	The LifeStyle Channel
Still to debut	Jason and The Residents	The Comedy Channel
Still to debut	Bridget Goddess	Nickelodeon
Still to debut	My Girlfriend's Secret Hidden Camera TV Show	The Comedy Channel
Still to debut	Shear Genius	To be announced
Still to debut	Slide	To be announced

=== Unknown networks ===
Date	Program
Still to debut	Sporting Nation
Still to debut	El Mariachi
Still to debut	Go Girl
Still to debut	The Sunshine Friends
Still to debut	Fleabag
Still to debut	Z Force
Still to debut	Credence
