= Bob Oblong =

Bob Oblong may refer to:

- Bob Oblong, a character in the American animated television series The Oblongs
- Bob Oblong, a character in the Australian animated television series The Shapies
