= List of Australian television series premieres in 2008 =

This is a list of Australian television programs which first aired in 2008. The list is arranged chronological order. Where more than one program debuted on the same date, those programs are listed alphabetically.

== Premieres ==
=== Free-to-air television ===
Program	Network	Debut date	Reference/s
Sleek Geeks	ABC1	3 January	
Who Do You Think You Are?	SBS TV	13 January	
Out of the Question	Seven Network	31 January	
The Zoo	Seven Network	3 February	
Bush Doctors	Seven Network	3 February	
So You Think You Can Dance Australia	Network Ten	3 February	
The Chopping Block	Nine Network	6 February	
Saving Kids with Damien Leith	Network Ten	7 February	
Monster House	Nine Network	12 February	
The NightCap	Seven HD	12 February	
Underbelly	Nine Network	13 February	
It Takes Two: Getting Ready	Seven Network	19 February	
Mercurio's Menu	Seven Network	23 February	
Stuff	ABC1	11 March	
AFL Game Day	Seven Network	16 March	
Animal Emergency	Nine Network	16 March	
East of Everything	ABC1	30 March	
Power of 10	Nine Network	31 March	
StarSpace with Adam Saunders	ABC1	3 April	
Stress Buster	ABC1	8 April	
My Kid's a Star	Nine Network	9 April	
Canal Road	Nine Network	16 April	
Fire 000	Nine Network	7 May	
Search and Rescue	Nine Network	7 May	
Bed of Roses	ABC1	10 May	
Holidays for Sale	Nine Network	17 May	
Domestic Blitz	Nine Network	18 May	
Q&A	ABC1	22 May	
Million Dollar Wheel of Fortune	Nine Network	26 May	
The Gruen Transfer	ABC1	28 May	
ABC Fora	ABC2	29 May	
Battle of the Choirs	Seven Network	15 June	
Places We Go	Network Ten	15 June	
The Nest	SBS TV	28 June	
Mark Loves Sharon	Network Ten	30 June	
Business Sense	Nine Network	6 July	
The One: The Search for Australia's Most Gifted Psychic	Seven Network	8 July	
The Hollowmen	ABC1	9 July	
Seven Early News	Seven Network	14 July	
National Nine News: Early News	Nine Network	14 July	
Thank You	Seven Network	3 August	
Hole in the Wall	Nine Network	6 August	
Make Me a Supermodel	Seven Network	6 August	
National Nine News: Sunday Morning Edition	Nine Network	10 August	
Yum Cha	Seven Network	10 August	
Find My Family	Seven Network	26 August	
Packed to the Rafters	Seven Network	26 August	
Crash Investigation Unit	Seven Network	27 August	
The Outdoor Room	Seven Network	31 August	
Taken Out	Network Ten	1 September	
Make Me a Supermodel: Off the Runway	Seven Network	2 September	
Rush	Network Ten	2 September	
Very Small Business	ABC1	3 September	
The Strip	Nine Network	4 September	
Outback Wildlife Rescue	Seven Network	7 September	
Bondi Rescue: Bali	Network Ten	10 September	
Kenny's World	Network Ten	10 September	
Battlefronts	Nine Network	14 September	
Two in the Top End	ABC1	16 September	
The Hack Half Hour	ABC2	22 September	
Outback 8	Network Ten	22 September	
Top Gear Australia	SBS TV	29 September	
Bogan Pride	SBS TV	6 October	
Pat Callinan's 4x4 Adventures	Network Ten	11 October	
First Australians	SBS TV	12 October	
Review with Myles Barlow	ABC2	16 October	
Swift and Shift Couriers	SBS TV	27 October	
Navy Divers	ABC1	28 October	
ABC News Breakfast	ABC2	3 November	
The Kingdom of Paramithi	Nine Network	10 November	
The Elephant Princess	Network Ten	13 November	
Out of the Blue	Network Ten	17 November	
This is Your Laugh	Seven HD	30 November	
The Waiting Room	Nine Network	4 December	
Larry the Lawnmower	Seven Network	9 December	
Sudden Impact	Nine Network	9 December	

=== Subscription television ===
Program	Network	Debut date	Reference/s
An Aussie Goes Bolly	FOX8	7 January	
Blood, Sweat and Gears	FOX8	18 January	
The Mansion	The Comedy Channel	3 April	
Dry Spell Gardening	The LifeStyle Channel	3 April	
The Dave & Kerley Show	Channel [V]	6 April	
Selling Houses Australia	The LifeStyle Channel	23 April	
Football Superstar	FOX8	19 June	
Owner Builder Australia	HOW TO Channel	2 July	
Project Runway Australia	Arena	7 July	
4 Ingredients	The LifeStyle Channel	11 September	
The Merrick & Rosso Show	The Comedy Channel	2 October	
Ita's Broadway	Ovation Channel	1 November	
The Great Australian Doorstep	HOW TO Channel	6 November	
Comedy Slapdown	The Comedy Channel	8 November	
Maggie With...	Bio.	30 November	
Airtime!	Nickelodeon	November	
An Aussie Goes Calypso	FOX8	3 December	
Reel Delicious	World Movies	6 December	
Brendan's Green Gift	The LifeStyle Channel	26 December	
