= Space Star =

Space Star may refer to:

- a star in outer space, an astrophysical object
- Mitsubishi Space Star, a car
- American Coleman, or Space Star, a 1950s–1970s American semi-trailer truck
- Space Stars, a 60-minute Saturday-morning cartoon TV series programming segment from Hanna-Barbera
- Space Star, a predecessor character to Super Commando Dhruva
- Space Star, the alter ego of David Bowie as a member of the band The Hype (band)

== See also ==
- StarSpace with Adam Saunders, an Australian TV show; see List of Australian television series premieres in 2008
- Space (disambiguation)
- Star (disambiguation)
