= Patrick O'Hagan =

Irish-Australian tenor singer

Charles Alphonsus Sherrard (1924-1993) was an Irish-Australian tenor singer better known by the stage name Patrick O'Hagan. Born in Derry, Northern Ireland, he immigrated to Australia where he found success singing traditional Irish and Celtic songs. He moved back to Ireland, settling in Drogheda in County Louth, where he ran a pub before he decided to return to Australia. In the late 1950s and early 1960s, he starred in the Australian television series Patrick O'Hagan Sings. His artistic career spanned two decades in the 1950s and 1960s, with a comeback in the mid-1970s.

== Personal life ==
He was married to Ellen Sherrard. They had four children, sons Michael, Eamon and Sean and daughter Fiona. Patrick O'Hagan died in Queensland, Australia. His wife Ellen died in 2012. His son Seán Patrick Michael Sherrard better known as Johnny Logan is a famous Australian-born Irish singer and composer and winner of the Eurovision Song Contest three times with "What's Another Year" in 1980, "Hold Me Now" in 1987 and "Why me" in 1992. Johnny Logan said about his father had been his inspiration. "I wanted to be just like him and for him to be proud of me, as I was of him," he said. The two toured together in Australia and New Zealand.

== Discography ==
=== Albums ===
- 1954: Irish Ballads (2 albums)
- 1957: Songs We Sing
- 1957: Irish Ballads
- 1957: Concert Tour
- 1958: Encores
- 1960: Presenting
- 1963: Scottish Airs
- 1974: The Heart & Soul of Ireland
- 1977: 22 Golden Shamrocks

Joint albums

- 1962: New Sounds in Irish Music (with Teresa Duffy)
