= Doug Mulray =

Australian media presenter (1951–2023)

- Radio Broadcaster Doug Mulray in c. 1983
- Born: Douglas John Mulray; 1 December 1951; Sydney, New South Wales Australia
- Died: 30 March 2023 (aged 71); Sydney, New South Wales, Australia
- Other name: Uncle Doug
- Occupations: Comedian; radio presenter; television presenter
- Years active: 1975–2019
- Spouse: Lizzie Muir
- Children: 3: James, Rosie and Tom
- Website: www.mediaman.com.au/profiles/mulray.html

Douglas John Mulray (1 December 1951 – 30 March 2023) was an Australian comedian, radio and television presenter and recording artist. Nicknamed Uncle Doug, he grew up in Dee Why on Sydney's Northern Beaches. Mulray was well known for his bawdy humour and charismatic larrikinism, with his style of free quips, parodies and "unbridled naughtiness".

== Radio career ==
Mulray started his early years as a salesman traveling in Europe before his father, a lawyer, suggested a career in broadcasting. Mulray began his radio career at 2AD in Armidale in September 1975, after taking a broadcasting course at the Digamae (Rod Muir's) Radio School. After six months he moved to Central Coast station 2GO in Gosford. During the mid-1970s he worked on 3AW Melbourne with a program called "Mulray & The Man".

In the late 1970s, he started a permanent job in Sydney with the newly formed Australian Broadcasting Corporation's alternative rock station 2JJ, in what would evolve in Triple J, where he built up a sizeable following. In 1982 he was poached by a new station, Triple M. Mulray served as breakfast host, which lifted the ratings share from 2.6 per cent to a staggering 18 per cent. He was known for his fictional characters, including Madam Zenda, who made outlandish comedic predictions about the future; Jack Africa, a man permanently paranoid who was convinced that chooks were out to get him; the Prime Mincer, a parody of the then Australian PM Bob Hawke; and Gloria, who was based on rival broadcaster Alan Jones. During Mulray's tenure, he brought into the program fellow presenters, writers and producers, one notable person being Andrew Denton, who worked on the show as head writer. Denton considered Mulray as a mentor, and he later stated that Mulray "single-handedly [put] FM radio on the map... the first ever to take a commercial radio station to number 1 against the dominant AM radio."

After a break from Triple M, Mulray worked for a brief time in the PM drive-time slot on 2SM with Peter FitzSimons before moving to Sydney radio station 2WS, eventually leaving the station in July 1999. He never regained the ratings he enjoyed at his former station Triple M. In 2014, industry analyst Radio Today rated his breakfast show as the third-best Australian metro FM breakfast show of all time.

== Television career ==
In 1992, he hosted the infamous Australia's Funniest Home Videos spin-off Australia's Naughtiest Home Videos; however, just halfway though one episode (which itself claimed to be "one off special" as in "off-colour"), it was pulled from broadcast by Nine Network by owner Kerry Packer after 34 minutes, who infamously called the station to "get that shit off the air!". Mulray was fired and banned for life from the Nine Network as a result. The program's timeslot was replaced by re-runs of American sitcom Cheers.

Mulray, however, would later return to Nine in 2002 to be a part of the special "Brian Henderson Toasted and Roasted" (even adding a subtle joke about his ban while Packer was in the audience), and also as judge on the 2005 series StarStruck. On Full Frontal, this was parodied with a skit of Mulray hosting a lottery draw, making sexual remarks as the balls drop.

He was also the host of the eponymously titled program Mulray, which ran briefly in the early 1990s on the Seven Network. In the late 1980s and early 1990s, Mulray was part of the Channel Seven Australian Touring Car Championship and Bathurst 1000 commentary team headed up by Mike Raymond and Neil Crompton until Seven lost the rights in 1997.

In August 2008, Australia's Naughtiest Home Videos was re-aired on the Nine Network. Mulray reportedly refused requests from Nine management to reappear as the host. One commentator wrote that "it may be that Mulray, a very smart man, knew he would have been open to a few cruel comparisons between the relatively youthful Mulray of 1992 and the solitary Mulray of 2008. The years have not been particularly kind."

== Honours ==
In 2019, Mulray was inducted into the Commercial Radio Hall of Fame.

== Personal life and death ==
Mulray was married to Lizzie Muir. He died from liver cancer in Sydney on 30 March 2023, at age 71. Tributes were given by radio and media personalities such as Andrew Denton, Peter Switzer and Ben Fordham.

== Discography ==
=== Studio albums ===
List of albums, with selected details and chart positions
Title	Album details	Peak chart positions
Title	Album details	AUS
What a Rude Album (with Ken Sterling)	Released: 1982; Format: LP, cassette; Label: OZ Records (OZS 1015)	22
2 Rude (with Ken Sterling)	Released: 1983; Format: LP, cassette; Label: OZ Records (OZS.1020)	24
Nice Legs Shame About the Fez	Released: November 1993; Format: CD, cassette; Label: Columbia (4755642)	32

=== Singles ===
List of singles, with selected chart positions
Title	Year	Peak chart positions	Album
Title	Year	AUS	Album
"I'm a Punk" / "Doug's Dub" (as The Rude Band)	1982	26	What a Rude Album
"You Are Soul"	1986	34	Non-album singles
"Werewolf"	1993	77	Non-album singles

== Filmography ==
As producer / director:

- 2004 – Kurt Elling: Live at the Basement (TV Movie documentary) (executive producer)
- 2003 – Steve Poltz: Live at the Basement (Video documentary) (executive producer)
- 2000 – The Basement (TV series) (director, also executive producer of one episode)
- 2000 – The Breakfast Show (executive producer)

As actor:

- 1980 – Making Weekend of Summer Last – Narrator

As himself:

- 1989 – 60 Minutes Episode dated 29 April 1989 (TV series)
- 1992 – Australia's Funniest Home Videos (TV series)
- 1992 – Australia's Naughtiest Home Videos (TV series)
- 1994 – Mulray (TV series)
- 1996 – Beauty and the Beast (TV series)
- 2000 – The Basement (TV series)
- 2002 – The Fat Episode #5.2 (TV series)
- 2005 – Starstruck (TV series)
- 2007 – Getaway 15th Birthday Special (TV series)

== Awards and nominations ==
=== ARIA Music Awards ===
The ARIA Music Awards are a set of annual ceremonies presented by Australian Recording Industry Association (ARIA), which recognise excellence, innovation and achievement across all genres of the music of Australia. They commenced in 1987.

Year	Nominee / work	Award	Result	Ref.
1994	Nice Legs Shame About the Fez	Best Comedy Release	Nominated	
