= Meet the Hockers =

Meet The Hockers is the Australian reality television series which premiered on 16 May 2017 until 4 July 2017 on 9Go!. It is produced and narrated by Kyle Sandilands and is similar in theme to Pawn Stars Australia.

This observational series looks inside ACEBEN, Australia's oldest and largest pawnshop's, established in 1907 (now franchised in 8 locations) in Haymarket, New South Wales. The shop is run by Michael Chambers and his team Pauly, Jess, Jaz and Aaron, who every day encounter new customers trying to negotiate the best deal.

== See also ==
- Pawn Stars Australia
- List of Australian television series
- List of programs broadcast by Nine Network
