= The Boat Show =

Australian lifestyle television program

The Boat Show is an Australian lifestyle television program hosted by Glenn Ridge, who is also executive producer. It features stories about boating, from people who are passionate about their boats and yachts, to the latest gadgets and boating tips and boating locations both in Australia and abroad. Presenters include Steven Jacobs, Grace McClure, Teisha Lowry and Kellie Johns. It began screening in 2003 on the Nine Network.

== See also ==
- List of Australian television series
- List of Nine Network programs
