= The Garden Gurus =

- Genre: Lifestyle
- Created by: Trevor Cochrane
- Creative director: Trevor Cochrane
- Presented by: Trevor Cochrane
- Country of origin: Australia
- Original language: English

Production
- Executive producer: Trevor Cochrane
- Production locations: Perth, Western Australia
- Running time: 21 minutes
- Production company: Guru Productions

Original release
- Network: Nine Network
- Release: 2 February 2002 – present

The Garden Gurus is an Australian lifestyle gardening television series that has aired on the Nine Network since 2 February 2002, and also distributed internationally across 86 countries.

== See also ==
- List of longest-running Australian television series
- List of programs broadcast by Nine Network
- List of Australian television series
