= David Waters (actor) =

Australian actor

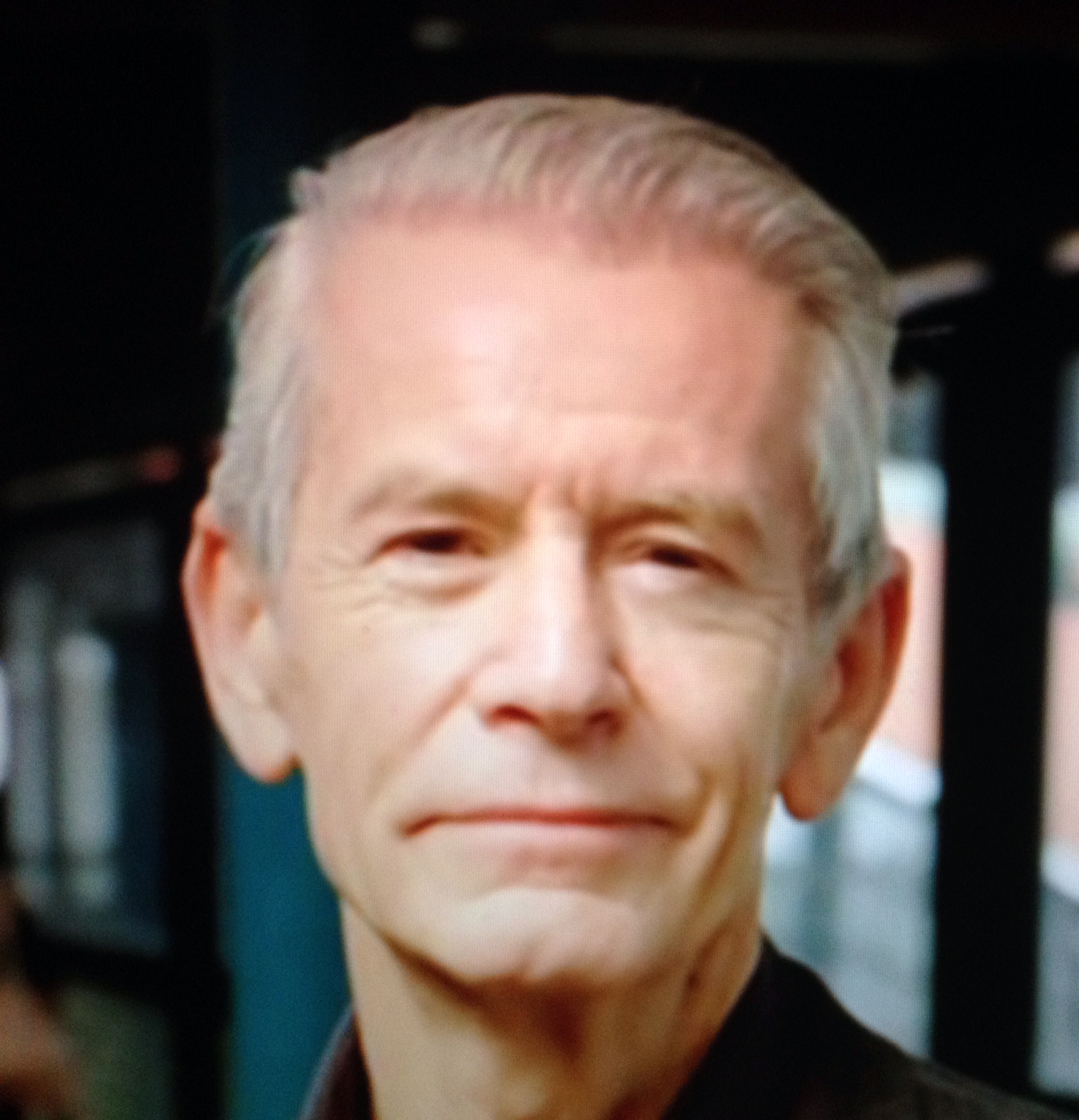
David Waters

David Waters is an English-born stage, television, and film actor.

== Early life ==
Waters was born in the UK and worked briefly as a journalist for George Newnes Press on their publications, Country Life and The New Musical Express, in London. He migrated to Australia in 1969.

== Career ==
=== Theatre ===
Water started his performance career in the performing arts in theatre, firstly at the La Boite Theatre, Brisbane and then joined the Queensland Theatre Company in repertory for six years and the Twelfth Night Theatre for a further two years. has appeared in leading roles in Equus, Da and The Imaginary Invalid and in several musicals including Expresso Bongo with Toni Lamond, You're A Good Man Charlie Brown with Geoffrey Rush, Lock Up Your Daughters with Geraldine Turner, The Fantasticks with Tony Sheldon and in Pride and Prejudice as Mr. Bingley, The Promise, Hot'l Baltimore and Don's Party with Barry Otto and Judith McGrath

He also performed at the Sydney Theatre Company in the musical Falsettos with Simon Burke, John O'May and Gina Riley and also performed at The Marian Street Theatre Sydney in Sailor Beware with Maggie Kirkpatrick and Judi Farr and has performed leading roles in plays with other Australian theatre companies including The Tasmanian Theatre Company and The Music Hall, Neutral Bay Sydney.

He appeared in the last musical produced for the J.C. Williamsons Theatrical Company (Australia) in the leading role of Bill Snibson in the revival of the Cockney musical Me and My Girl directed by Stephen Fry and Mike Ockrent at Her Majesty's Theatre, Sydney and at The Arts Centre Melbourne.

In the United Kingdom, he appeared on the West End in Stepping Out for the Bill Kenwright Organization and at The Theatre Royal, Windsor continuing on a national tour of the UK.

=== Television and film ===
Waters was the host of the Channel Nine national children's quiz program Match Mates and is well known for his role as David Bridges in the internationally shown television series Prisoner and appearances in Division 4, Matlock, Homicide, A Country Practice, Cop Shop, Sweet and Sour, Tickled Pink, Desert Foxes, Loss of Innocence.

On film he has appeared in:

- Coralie Landsdowne Says No (ABC Films) Michael Carson - Director
- Kindred Spirits (ABC Films) Director - Peter Fisk
- The Killing of Angel Street (Forest Home Films) Director - Donald Crombie
- The Grand Palaver ( MSQUARE Productions ) Director - Michael Cristian Greene 2018
- On The Crescent (short film) Director - Jacob Melamed 2018
- Star-Crossed (short film) Director - Jacob Melamed 2018

== Restaurateur ==
Waters has also been a successful restaurateur, having owned and operated numerous fine dining establishments and bistros in Sydney and the Blue Mountains, which have received Chef's Hats Awards and A People's Choice Awards from The Australian Good Food and Travel Guide. He is also an avid gardener on his property Bowerlands in The Blue Mountains, NSW Australia.

== Awards ==
- National Critics Award-Best Actor – Alan Strang in Equus
- Brisbane Critics Choice Award-Best Actor – Charlie in Da.
