= Australia's Naughtiest Home Videos =

1992 Australian television program

- Genre: Black comedy
- Presented by: Doug Mulray
- Country of origin: Australia
- Original language: English
- No. of episodes: 1

Production
- Producer: Tafner Ramsay Productions
- Production locations: Sydney, New South Wales
- Running time: 60 minutes (intended running time, including commercials; 34:36 aired during initial broadcast); 38:55 (intended running time, excluding commercials; 24:05 aired during initial broadcast); 60 minutes (repackaged episode with commercials, 41:11 without commercials)

Original release
- Network: Nine Network
- Release: 3 September 1992

Related
- Australia's Funniest Home Videos

Australia's Naughtiest Home Videos is an Australian television comedy program that was broadcast on Nine Network on 3 September 1992. It was a one-off special spin-off of Australia's Funniest Home Video Show, depicting videos of sexual situations and other sexually explicit content. In a rare move, the program was abruptly taken off the air partway through the broadcast of its first and only episode on the order of then-network owner Kerry Packer.

== Background ==
Australia's Funniest Home Video Show premiered in 1990. Viewers would send in amateur-shot videos that were unintentionally humorous, and the video deemed the "funniest" by the studio audience was awarded a prize at the end of the show.

The producers often received racy or risque videos that could not be included into the program due to its family-friendly nature, and since the show's policy stated that videos sent in by viewers could not be sent back, videos that did not make it onto the program were still kept by the station. The producers decided to compile these videos into a one-off special aimed at an adult audience.

Australia's Naughtiest Home Videos differed from Australia's Funniest Home Video Show in more than just the content of the videos. It had a different opening, a modified version of the Australia's Funniest Home Video Show's theme song, and a slightly modified set. It was hosted by Australian radio personality Doug Mulray. Due to the difference in content, the show aired at 8:30 p.m. and was preceded by a short message warning viewers of the show's content, and informing them that it was a one-off special that was different from Australia's Funniest Home Video Show.

== Content ==
The show followed the same structure of Australia's Funniest Home Video Show, in which the videos were shown in short blocks, interspersed with humorous monologues written and delivered by Mulray. Mulray often poked fun at the content of the videos, which he described as "The most sensational collection of home videos since Rodney King nicked out for a pizza recently." Mulray also did humorous voice-overs as the videos were shown, similar to Danny McMaster's on Australia's Funniest Home Video Show.

== Cancellation ==
External videos
- The moment Australia's Naughtiest Home Videos was pulled off the air. This particular video shows the Nine Network "Technical Difficulties" bumper appearing as soon as the show goes to a scheduled commercial break and cutting to the beginning of an episode of Cheers.

Kerry Packer, the owner of the Nine Network at the time, was informed of the show's content by friends while having dinner. He tuned in to watch the show, which was being transmitted on TCN-9, and was so offended by its content that he phoned the studio operators and angrily told them to take it off the air. Within minutes, the program was pulled. Viewers saw a Nine Network ident interrupt the program with a speech by Nine continuity announcer John Martin of a "technical problem" before beginning a rerun of the American sitcom Cheers, which filled the remaining airtime.

The Nine Network bumper occurred at different points in the program in different areas due to time differences: In the eastern states except Victoria, the bumper occurred at the beginning of a scheduled commercial break. In Victoria, the show abruptly switched to Cheers during a commercial break almost 46 minutes into its runtime but without the "technical problem" announcement. In South Australia and the Northern Territory, which are half an hour behind the east coast, it occurred immediately after Mulray's monologue about "bosoms" or after a clip of a child grabbing a kangaroo's scrotum. The show was cancelled before it was scheduled to air in Western Australia, which is two hours behind the east coast, so its Nine Network affiliate displayed a graphic of the Nine Network logo on-screen with a brief message mentioning that the special was cancelled before beginning an episode of Cheers. When the show was cancelled, the message went as follows:

We apologise for this interruption.
Unfortunately, a technical problem prevents us continuing our scheduled program for the moment.
In the meantime, we bring you a brief, alternative program.

— John Martin, Nine Network continuity announcer.

Despite Packer's objections to the series' content, it was popular among viewers. The special was recorded to a record studio audience. After the announcement, Nine reportedly received "thousands" of phone calls from viewers, with 65 percent of callers upset with the program being pulled, in contrast to the 60 callers who called in during the show's broadcast, complaining about the show. Viewers were generally bewildered by the sudden interruption and the cut to Cheers, not knowing about the show's cancellation until it was widely reported by the Australian media outlets the next day.

The day after the special aired, a furious Packer showed up at Nine's headquarters and held meetings in which he loudly berated Nine's managers and censors, referring to the program as "disgusting and offensive." After these meetings, Mulray and many of the staff who were involved with the creation of the special were fired, with Mulray also being banned for life from Channel Nine. Kris Noble, the network's drama and entertainment chief, hid the original tape in the archives of the network's Willoughby studio.

On the same day, the Australian Broadcasting Tribunal announced an investigation into the series for possible broadcast standard violations, adding that more than 150 complaints regarding its controversial content were submitted and 25 percent of its callers objected to the program being shortened. Eventually, the ABT found that the program had not breached these standards and had been correctly rated as AO.

On his radio show the next day, Mulray joked: "I am the first man in Australian history to be pulled off by Kerry Packer."

Mulray returned to Nine to be a judge on the 2005 series StarStruck shortly before Packer's death on 26 December of that year.

== Rebroadcast ==
In 2008, the original tape of the show hidden by Noble was located by Nine's head of factual television.

It was aired in its entirety at 8:30 p.m. on 28 August 2008, one week short of sixteen years after the original special, and at the same time. Promoted as "the show Kerry Packer didn't want you to see", it featured commentary from Bert Newton; Packer had died in December 2005, and Mulray refused Nine's request to host the special.

The special was interrupted by the Channel Nine bumper and "technical difficulties" announcement 36 minutes in, cutting to the Cheers opening credits before resuming to a monologue by Newton, who referenced the incident by saying "Instead, they got that announcement of 'technical difficulties' which you heard, which was true [...] it's TECHNICALLY very DIFFICULT to keep a show on air [...] with Mr.Packer on the phone YELLING at you!" The latter part of the special that never aired was then broadcast. However, the re-airing was censored, with portions of Mulray's monologues (including jibes about "fat kids") being cut from the special as they were deemed to be "no longer acceptable".

== See also ==
- Turn-On, an American sketch comedy TV series that was also pulled from broadcast during its first and only episode.
- Videos After Dark, an American adaptation of Australia's Naughtiest Home Videos that debuted in 2019 and likewise was cancelled after only one airing.
