= The Car Show =

Australian lifestyle television program

The Car Show is an Australian lifestyle television program hosted by Glenn Ridge, who is also Executive Producer. The Car Show features stories about motoring. Presenters include Steven Jacobs and Bridget McIntyre. It began screening in 2003 on the Nine Network.

== See also ==
- List of Australian television series
- List of Nine Network programs
