= David Whitehill =

Australian television presenter

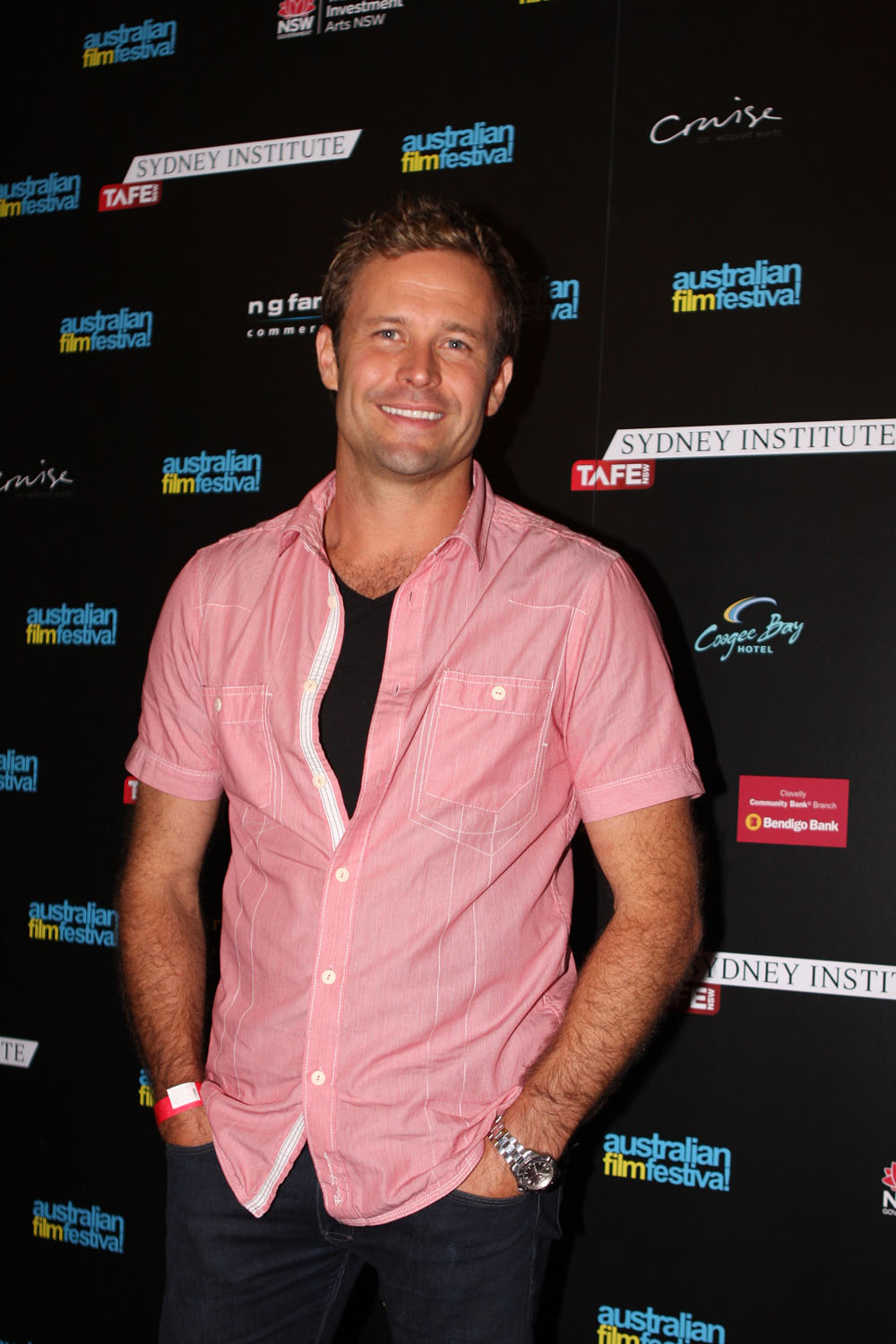
David Whitehill at the Australian Short Film Festival (Swerve Premiere), in March 2012

David Whitehill is an Australian TV personality, former Cleo Bachelor of the Year (2001) and dolphin trainer for Sea World on the Gold Coast.

== Career ==
Whitehill has hosted and appeared on a variety of TV shows from 2002, including Hot Source, Brisbane Extra, Mornings with Kerri-Anne, Just for Laughs: Gags, So Fresh and Saturday Afternoon! and lifestyle travel show Escape.

In 2009 he was one of five Australians shortlisted for The Best Job in the World competition run by Tourism Queensland.

In July 2010 it was announced that he would co-host the Qantas in-flight lifestyle programs.
