= You Saved My Life =

- Also known as: Missing Pieces
- Genre: Factual
- Presented by: Tara Brown; Andrew Rochford
- Country of origin: Australia
- Original language: English
- No. of seasons: 1
- No. of episodes: 10

Original release
- Network: Nine Network
- Release: 20 April – 22 June 2009

You Saved My Life is an Australian factual television series that screened on the Nine Network in 2009. It was hosted by 60 Minutes reporter Tara Brown and the doctor Andrew Rochford.

You Saved My Life follows the stories of people who have been rescued in an emergency and reunited with their rescuers. It has a similar premise to the successful Seven Network factual television series Triple Zero Heroes. Two weeks after it started airing and six episodes in, the show was cancelled for the final time after having been taken off air and reinstated.

In one episode, a plane crash survivor, Allana Arnott, meets with Hugh Russell, who had rescued her in the Blue Mountains 18 years prior. In another episode, a toddler who is now 26 meets with the train conductor who lept from a speeding train to rescue the child from the tracks moments ahead of an oncoming express train between Newcastle and Sydney.

== Reception ==
Colin Vickery of the Herald Sun found the show to be a "a three-hanky job" and compared it to the Seven Network show Triple Zero Heroes where every installment also closed by bringing together the rescuer and rescuee. In a mixed review, The Daily Telegraph reviewer Erin McWhirter called it a show that like Find My Family was "capable of producing tears in even the most hardened of viewers". McWhirter concluded, "Re-enactments might not be this program's strong point, but viewers will be so caught up in the real-life moments that the clunky moments fail to detract from the overall effect." Anita Beaumont of Newcastle Herald also had a mixed review of the "heartstring-plucking" show, stating, "The emotions are real and touching, although there is a huge element of cheesiness — thanks to the soundtrack — that will hinder one's enthralment."

The Daily Telegraph reviewer Ellen Rigney stated, "While the featured people are inspiring and their stories are moving, repeated close-ups of the rescuer and rescuee hugging in slow motion tends to grate after a while." Jackie Tracy of the Sunday Mail praised the show for having "well-researched stories" and "pacy re-enactments". The Australian journalist Amanda Meade attributed the show's cancellation after six episodes to being a "cheap copycat program" that attempted to capitalise on the popularity of Seven Network's Find My Family.
