= Desert Vet =

Australian television series

Desert Vet is an Australian factual television series. It follows the work of emergency veterinarian Dr Rick Fenny. The series is filmed in Western Australian locations such as Karratha, Port Hedland, Shark Bay and Kalgoorlie.

Fenny is best known as the veterinarian of Red Dog. He is joined by his marine biologist son Ed and daughter Louisa, who is also a vet. The series is narrated by Charles Wooley.

Desert Vet was screened as a pilot on the Seven Network in 2018 before screening as a series on the Nine Network and UKTV in 2019.

== See also ==
- Bondi Vet
- Dr. Lisa to the Rescue
