= StarStruck (2005 TV series) =

StarStruck was a short-lived 2005 Australian television series, that screened on the Nine Network. It was hosted by Larry Emdur and Catriona Rowntree. It was based on the Dutch TV show Soundmixshow. Contestants were introduced and then whisked away to be transformed into the star of their choice. They would emerge for their performance, supported by dancers, a choir and an orchestra.

Contestants were judged on their performances by Doug Mulray and Vanessa Amorosi.

The program debuted strongly winning the 7.30pm timeslot with an average of 1.58 million viewers across Australia.

== See also ==
- List of Australian television series
- List of Nine Network programs
