= Patrick O'Hagan Sings =

- Genre: Music television
- Starring: Patrick O'Hagan
- Country of origin: Australia
- Original language: English
- No. of episodes: 26

Production
- Running time: 15 minutes

Original release
- Network: ATN-7
- Release: 1959

Patrick O'Hagan Sings was an Australian television series starring the Irish tenor of the same name. It was produced by station ATN-7 in November 1958, and began being broadcast in early 1959. Unlike most Australian-produced series of the era, which were live, Patrick O'Hagan Sings was produced directly on film, with a total of 26 episodes made, each of which was designed to fit in a quarter-hour time-slot. Patrick O'Hagan sang songs in the series.

In Sydney the series aired on ATN-7, and aired at 3:00PM on Tuesdays. In Melbourne, the series aired on station GTV-9 at 3:00PM on Thursdays.

The National Film and Sound Archive holds a near-complete run of the series, as 16mm picture and sound negatives.

A different series by this title aired in 1965 on ABC Television.

== See also ==
- Australian Walkabout - Another 1950s-era Australian-produced filmed series
