= Hot Source =

Hot Source is an Australian children's television series which first screened on the Nine Network in 2003. The show had a number of presenters for various segments but Miranda Deakin and David Whitehill were with the show from beginning to end.

It screened at 4pm on weekdays and was aimed at the demographic of school-aged children to the age of fourteen. This show ran from 2003 to 2006 and also screened on Canadian and British television.
