= Match Mates =

- Genre: Game Show
- Created by: Grundy Organisation
- Directed by: Ken Field
- Presented by: David Waters
- Country of origin: Australia
- Original language: English
- No. of series: 1

Production
- Executive producer: Bill Mason
- Producer: Hal Croxon
- Camera setup: Multi-Camera
- Running time: 30 Min.
- Production companies: Grundy Organisation; Nine Network Children's Programming

Original release
- Network: Nine Network
- Release: 1981 – 1982

Match Mates is an Australian children's television game show that was broadcast afternoon on Nine Network Australia between 1981 and 1982. It was produced by the Grundy Organisation for Nine Network's Children's Programming. Actor David Waters was the emcee.

== History ==
The first episode of Match Mates was broadcast in July 1981. It was hosted by David Waters. Despite being well received by children in preschool, it is directed at children between the ages of 10 and 14. Alongside the Grundy Organisation, Penny Spence, who served as Nine Network's vice president of Children's Programmes, produced the show.

== Object ==
Four children compete against each other playing a game similar to the adult game show Concentration that also had elements of Sale of the Century and the later game Hot Streak.

== Game Play ==
=== Rounds One and Two ===
Two different children competed at a time in each round.

==== Toss-Up Question (Ripper Rhyme) ====
The children were asked a "ripper rhyme" by the emcee. A general knowledge question written in the form of a rhyming couplet that was missing the last rhyming word. The first child to buzz with the correct word won control of the puzzle.

==== Rebus Puzzle ====
Both children were shown a puzzle board of twenty numbered squares. Each square concealed a picture (either a drawing or photograph) AND part of a rebus puzzle. The emcee also gave a clue to the rebus' solution which was related to the "ripper rhyme". Starting with the child who won the "ripper rhyme", each child chose two numbers, one at a time, from the puzzle board. Each number revealed a different picture. In order to "match", the chosen pictures must be related in some way to each other. If the pictures "matched", the corresponding rebus pieces were revealed and the child was then given the opportunity to solve the puzzle. If the pictures did not "match" or if the child could not solve the puzzle, the opposing child received control of the puzzle. The first child to solve the puzzle won the round and advanced to Round Three.

==== Special Squares ====
===== Sound Effect =====
One number, represented by a drawing of an ear, contains a sound that is associated with one of the pictures on the puzzle board.

===== Catch-a-Clue =====
One number, represented by a drawing of a butterfly net, contains a verbal clue that is read by the announcer and is associated with one of the items on the puzzle board.

=== Round Three ===
The winners of both round one and round two competed against each other.

==== Toss-Up Question (Who/What/Where am I?) ====
The children were shown a succession of increasingly larger clues to the identity of a person, place, thing, etc.; given by children recorded on videotape. The first child to buzz in with the correct answer won control of the puzzle.

==== Super Word Puzzle ====
Both children were shown another puzzle board of twenty numbered squares. This time the board was split into two different sets of ten numbered squares. Numbers one through ten on top contained pictures. Numbers eleven through twenty on the bottom contained scrambled words related to the pictures. Each square also concealed part of a "super word", a word where each letter was separated by a space. The pictures, scrambled words, and "super word" all related to the toss-up identity. Starting with the child who won the toss-up identity, each child chose one number revealing a picture from the top half of the puzzle board, and one number revealing a scrambled word from the bottom half. In order to "match", the chosen picture must be related in some way to the chosen scrambled word. If the pieces "matched", the corresponding "super word" letter or space was revealed and the child was then given the opportunity to solve the puzzle. If the pieces did not "match" or if the child could not solve the puzzle, the opposing child received control of the puzzle. The first child to solve the puzzle won the round, the game, and a $50(AUS) savings account. All runners up received consolation gifts, including toys and games.

=== Round Four ===
All four children took part in a final round to test the powers of observation.

==== Match a Mime ====
The children tried to communicate a specific situation using pantomime from one child to another. With three of the children having their backs turned to the action, the emcee mimes out a situation to the first child. When finished, a bell sounds and the first child must then repeat the mime to a second child. When the bell sounds again, the second child must repeat the mime to a third child, and then the third child must repeat the mime to the last child. At the end, the emcee then asks the last child to identify the situation that was observed and pantomimed; followed by the third child, the second child, and finally the first child. At the end of the round, the children select a toy or game to keep from a table full of toys at one end of the set.

== Trivia ==
- Before the first two rounds, the children participating in the round entered the stage by way of playground slides on each side in the back of the set. The emcee also entered on one of the slides at the beginning of the show.
- Before each commercial break, the home audience was asked a question for which the answer was revealed after the break. Some questions involved identifying an item by the sound it makes or answering a multiple choice question.

== Educational Consultant ==
- The Educational Consultant for Match Mates was Dr. Millicent Poole, a professor of education in Australia and New Zealand.

== Reception ==
The Sydney Morning Herald called Match Mates "fun", writing that it "prove[s] that children's TV can be light, merry and educational into the bargain".
