= The Beach Crew =

Australian animated television series

The Beach Crew logo

The Beach Crew is an Australian animated series produced by Victorian-based production company The Beach Crew Productions, distributed by KidsCo and broadcast on KidsCo since June 2010. The series was designed and animated by Smart and Sheard Productions. Which was owned by Damian Smart and Mark Sheard

The series follows the adventures of Billy Boogie, Sammy Surfboard and Mini Malibu as they protect their beloved beach from the villains Cash Coin and Slimy Seaweed.

Each five-minute episode (18 in total) incorporates gently educational messaging about the importance of healthy eating as well as fitness and beach/sun safety.

== Characters ==
- Billy Boogie - Billy is the hero of the beach and leads the way, fighting the evil crooks of Beachville wherever they may go. He is fun, feisty and always up for a good time.
- Sammy Surfboard - Sammy is slightly aloof, loves a gag and is Billy's best friend in the whole world. Together they surf around the world having fun while fighting the baddies of Beachville.
- Mini Malibu - Mini Malibu runs the Beachville Bistro and is best friends with Billy and Sammy. She is a kind, caring young girl who loves to surf and helps the boys in their adventures.
- Cash Coin - Cash Coin is Beachville's greedy crooked criminal and is always doing evil things to make a buck. He stops at nothing to get more cash into his dirty hands.
- Slimy Seaweed - Cash Coin's sidekick Slimy Seaweed is an underhanded seedy green piece of weed. Slimy comes from the bad part of town and always seems to slip into no good. Slimy can be seen causing trouble all across the beach, but Billy and Sammy work to foil his plans.
- Uncle Umbrella - Uncle Umbrella is the wise English old man of the beach and in his own way provides much great advice as the team battle the evil antics of the crooked criminals of Beachville. He stays up on the beach with his friend Screechy Seagull, chatting the day away.
- Screechy Seagull - Screechy Seagull is the eye in the sky, always flying around and making her screech noises. She is an over-enthusiastic seagull who always wants a piece of the action. With her flock, she flies over Beachville and controls the skies.
