= 50 Years 50 Stars =

Television series

50 Years 50 Stars is a television special that marked 50 years of television in Australia. Hosted by Mike Munro and broadcast on Sunday 10 September 2006 on the Nine Network, the special counted down the top 50 greatest living Australian television personalities.

Also in the special featured many special comments from other television personalities, including Charles 'Bud' Tingwell, John Wood, Erik Thomson, Bert Newton, Jacki Weaver, Scott Cam, James Brayshaw, Jules Lund, Livinia Nixon, Steve Vizard, Ray Martin, Tracy Grimshaw, Brian Henderson, Giaan Rooney, Kimberley Davies & Jana Wendt.

1. Bert Newton
2. Kath & Kim
3. Garry McDonald
4. Paul Hogan
5. Don Lane
6. Kylie Minogue
7. Barry Humphries
8. John Farnham
9. John Wood
10. Olivia Newton-John
11. Magda Szubanski
12. Eddie McGuire
13. Andrew Denton
14. Molly Meldrum
15. Daryl Somers
16. Mike Willesee
17. Rove McManus
18. Sigrid Thornton
19. Eric Bana
20. Jana Wendt
21. Lisa McCune
22. Charles 'Bud' Tingwell
23. Noeline Brown
24. John Clarke
25. Mike Walsh
26. Stuart Wagstaff
27. Georgie Parker
28. Don Burke
29. Reg Grundy
30. Richie Benaud
31. Ray Martin
32. Rebecca Gibney
33. Nicole Kidman
34. Brian Henderson
35. Claudia Karvan
36. George Negus
37. Denise Drysdale
38. Glenn Robbins
39. Rob Sitch
40. Michael Caton
41. Jacki Weaver
42. Lorraine Bayly
43. Kerri-Anne Kennerley
44. Ossie Ostrich
45. Bec Cartwright/Hewitt
46. Toni Lamond
47. Mark Mitchell
48. Jack Thompson
49. Roy and HG
50. Delta Goodrem

== See also ==
- List of Australian television series
- 50 Years 50 Shows
