= Just for Laughs (Australian TV series) =

Australian hidden camera clip show

- Also known as: Just for Laughs
- Presented by: David Whitehill
- Country of origin: Australia
- Original language: English
- No. of episodes: 4

Production
- Running time: 30 minutes (Including commercials)

Original release
- Network: Nine Network
- Release: 24 September – 8 October 2007

Just for Laughs
- Also known as: Just for Laughs Australia
- Presented by: Tommy Little
- Country of origin: Australia
- Original language: English

Production
- Running time: 30 minutes (Including commercials)

Original release
- Network: Network 10; Fox Comedy
- Release: 2013

Just for Laughs was an Australian light entertainment television program that aired on the Nine Network. The show was hosted by David Whitehill, and showed humorous hidden cameras clips from around the world.

== Just For Laughs Comedy Festival ==
Just For Laughs Australia, is filmed at the Sydney Opera House during the Just For Laughs Comedy Festival (Network Ten 2013–) (Fox Comedy 2013–)

== See also ==
- List of Australian television series
