= 50 Years 50 Shows =

50 Years 50 Shows is a television special that marked 50 years of television in Australia. Broadcast on Sunday 25 September 2005 on the Nine Network and hosted by Eddie McGuire, the special counted down the top 50 greatest Australian television programmes.

== Premise ==
The list of programs to be included in the top fifty was based on a poll of television writers, producers, directors, actors and critics. Once the top 50 was collated, their running order was decreed by the ratings the programs had achieved when broadcast: with the highest rating program in number one spot.

== List ==
1. In Melbourne Tonight/The Graham Kennedy Show
2. The Paul Hogan Show
3. The Opening Ceremony of the Games of the XXVII Olympiad
4. The Mavis Bramston Show
5. Brides of Christ
6. Kath & Kim
7. The Don Lane Show
8. 60 Minutes
9. Number 96
10. The Sullivans
11. A Town Like Alice
12. Homicide
13. Bandstand
14. A Country Practice
15. Power Without Glory
16. The Mike Walsh Show
17. Australian Story
18. Four Corners
19. The Dismissal
20. Blankety Blanks
21. Bangkok Hilton
22. Frontline
23. Enough Rope with Andrew Denton
24. My Name's McGooley, What's Yours?
25. Hey Hey It's Saturday
26. Parkinson in Australia
27. The Norman Gunston Show
28. Anzacs
29. SeaChange
30. Fast Forward
31. This Is Your Life
32. Young Talent Time
33. Mother and Son
34. Bobby Limb's Sound of Music
35. Blue Murder
36. Burke's Backyard
37. Blue Heelers
38. Skippy the Bush Kangaroo
39. Geoffrey Robertson's Hypotheticals
40. Countdown
41. Sylvania Waters
42. Graham Kennedy's Coast to Coast
43. Media Watch
44. The Naked Vicar Show
45. The Aunty Jack Show
46. Neighbours
47. Foreign Correspondent
48. Sunday
49. Play School
50. The D-Generation

== Rescreening ==
The program was re-aired on Monday 11 September 2006 hosted by Mike Munro to celebrate the official 50th anniversary of television in Australia.

== See also ==
- List of Australian television series
- 50 Years 50 Stars
