= The Waiting Room (TV series) =

Australian observational documentary series

- Genre: Observational Documentary
- Presented by: Andrew Rochford
- Country of origin: Australia
- Original language: English

Production
- Running time: 30 minutes

Original release
- Network: Nine Network
- Release: 4 December 2008 – 2008

The Waiting Room is an Australian observational documentary series that began airing on the Nine Network on 4 December 2008.

== Production ==
Hosted by the doctor Andrew Rochford, the show began airing on 4 December 2008. The medical drama's episodes are 30 minutes long. The show profiles hospital patients to illustrate their journey to their current circumstances. Filming took place at Mater Hospital, North Sydney, St Vincent's Hospital, Sydney, and The Children's Hospital at Westmead.

== Reception ==
Anita Beaumont of the Newcastle Herald praised the show for presenting "some gripping stories from hospital waiting rooms" and said "these often quite amazing stories that make this reality series surprisingly bearable". In a positive review of the show's first episode, The Courier-Mail television critic Tim Artlett said that of the four patients who are profiled "all are engaging and have a positive outlook no matter what their situation" He said the show has "a stellar soundtrack" that "add[s] to the pace and positive tone" through music from Coldplay, U2, and Ben Lee. Artlett concluded, "This show's winning combination of human interest and an admirable host could see it make an appearance during next year's ratings season."
