= Money for Jam =

Australian television series

- Genre: Lifestyle
- Presented by: Paul Clitheroe; Effie Zahos; Shelley Craft; Shane Crawford
- Country of origin: Australia
- Original language: English
- No. of seasons: 1
- No. of episodes: 8

Production
- Running time: 30 minutes (including commercials)

Original release
- Network: Nine Network
- Release: 2 September – 4 November 2009

Related
- Money (Australian TV program)

Money for Jam is an Australian lifestyle television series which airs on the Nine Network. The series premiered on 2 September 2009 at 8:00 pm, and originally consisted of eight episodes. It featured Money magazine editor Effie Zahos and financial expert Paul Clitheroe as presenters, as well as Nine Network personalities Shelley Craft and Shane Crawford. The series' title is a reference to the colloquialism "money for jam", which is used to imply that 'money can be made easily'. Since its release, the show has not received a second season.

== Episodes ==
| # | Title | Airdate | Timeslot | Ratings (Note: Overall national viewers, numbers in brackets indicate nightly ratings position.) |
|---|---|---|---|---|
| 1 | "Episode 1" | 2 September 2009 | Wednesday 8:00 pm–8:30 pm | 1,324,000 (4th) |
| 2 | "Episode 2" | 9 September 2009 | Wednesday 8:00 pm–8:30 pm | 1,093,000 (9th) |
| 3 | "Episode 3" | 16 September 2009 | Wednesday 8:00 pm–8:30 pm | 1,018,000 (13th) |
| 4 | "Episode 4" | 23 September 2009 | Wednesday 8:00 pm–8:30 pm | 1,126,000 |
| 5 | "Episode 5" | 15 October 2009 | Wednesday 8:00 pm–8:30 pm | 858,000 |
| 6 | "Episode 6" | 22 October 2009 | Wednesday 8:00 pm–8:30 pm | 982,000 |
| 7 | "Episode 7" | 28 October 2009 | Wednesday 8:00 pm–8:30 pm | 834,000 |
| 8 | "Episode 8" | 4 November 2009 | Wednesday 8:00 pm–8:30 pm | 876,000 |
| Average series ratings (ongoing) | | | | 995,000 |
