= Missing Pieces (TV series) =

- Genre: Factual
- Narrated by: Peter Overton
- Country of origin: Australia
- Original language: English
- No. of seasons: 1
- No. of episodes: 8

Original release
- Network: Nine Network
- Release: 20 April – 25 May 2009

Missing Pieces is an Australian factual television series that screened on the Nine Network in 2009. It was hosted by Peter Overton.

Missing Pieces follows the stories of people who embark on a life-changing journey to find someone special who is missing from their lives. It has a similar premise to the successful Seven Network factual television series Find My Family.
