= Australia's Perfect Couple =

- Genre: Reality
- Presented by: Jules Lund
- Country of origin: Australia
- Original language: English
- No. of seasons: 1
- No. of episodes: 6

Production
- Running time: 60 minutes (episodes 1–3); 30 minutes (episodes 4–6) (including commercials)

Original release
- Network: Nine Network
- Release: 22 July – 26 August 2009

Australia's Perfect Couple (formerly known as Here Come the Newlyweds and For Richer or Poorer during production) was an Australian reality television series which aired on the Nine Network. The series was hosted by Jules Lund, and premiered on 22 July 2009 at 7:30 pm. The series ran for six episodes,

== Format ==
Australia's Perfect Couple featured eight newlywed couples brought together under the one roof. Knowledge of each other is put to the test in a competition where their devotion to their partner overshadows their need to win prize money of A$210,000 (equivalent to $286,297 in 2022).

== Episodes ==
Australia's Perfect Couple metropolitan viewership and nightly position
Episode		Airdate	Timeslot	Viewers	Rank	Ref
1	"Episode 1"	22 July 2009	Wednesday 7:30 pm–8:30 pm	798,000	#24	
2	"Episode 2"	29 July 2009	Wednesday 7:30 pm–8:30 pm	762,000	#23	
3	"Episode 3"	5 August 2009	Wednesday 7:30 pm–8:30 pm	672,000	#27	
4	"Episode 4"	12 August 2009	Wednesday 8:00 pm–8:30 pm	701,000	#30	
5	"Episode 5"	19 August 2009	Wednesday 8:00 pm–8:30 pm	698,000	#26	
6	"Episode 6"	26 August 2009	Wednesday 8:00 pm–8:30 pm	610,000	#30	
