= Triple Zero Heroes =

- Genre: Observational Documentary
- Country of origin: Australia
- Original language: English
- No. of seasons: 1

Production
- Running time: 30 minutes (including commercials)

Original release
- Network: Seven Network
- Release: 8 February – 22 March 2009

Triple Zero Heroes is an Australian observational documentary series that airs on the Seven Network. It is an original production by FremantleMedia Australia.

== Overview ==
Through interviews, dramatisations and the original 000 emergency call recordings, the series reconstructs emergencies where people have relied on the service to save loved ones from misadventure, serious injury and death.

In February 2009, police in New South Wales claimed that a 10-year-old boy saved his sister from drowning using CPR skills he learned from watching the first episode of the show.

== Weekly ratings ==
The ratings for the series are in the table below (The viewers are in millions).

#	AU Air Date	Timeslot	Viewers (m)	Nightly Rank (#)	Weekly Rank (#)
1	8 February 2009	8:00pm Sunday	1.725	4	6
2	15 February 2009	8:00pm Sunday	1.453	4	9
3	22 February 2009	8:00pm Sunday	1.228	5	
4	1 March 2009	8:00pm Sunday	1.320	3	
5	8 March 2009	8:00pm Sunday	1.331	3	
6	15 March 2009	8:00pm Sunday	1.295	5	
7	22 March 2009	8:00pm Sunday			
