= Search and Rescue (Australian TV series) =

2008 documentary series

- Genre: Observational Documentary
- Country of origin: Australia
- No. of seasons: 1

Original release
- Network: Nine Network
- Release: 7 May 2008 – 2008

Search and Rescue is an Australian observational documentary series that first aired on the Nine Network on 7 May 2008.

Search and Rescue follows the search and rescue operations of several different Victoria Police divisions, such as the Victoria Police Air-Wing and Victoria Police Diving Squad.
