= The Shapies =

- Genre: Children's television series, comedy, drama, action, adventure
- Created by: Mark Traynor
- Developed by: Mark Traynor
- Written by: Mark Traynor; Bob La Castra; Helen MacWhirter; Stuart Connolly; Robert Adams; Anthony Watt; Brendan Luno; John Moss; Louise Fox
- Directed by: Mark Traynor; Robbert Smit
- Voices of: Tony Bellette; Jane U'Brien; Joey Moore; George Blackley; Declan Steele; Bonnie Fraser
- Theme music composer: Rob Robertson
- Opening theme: The Shapies
- Ending theme: The Shapies
- Composers: Rob Robertson; Brian D White; Ken E McLean
- Country of origin: Australia
- Original language: English
- No. of series: 2
- No. of episodes: 27

Production
- Executive producer: Wes Tatters
- Producer: Wes Tatters
- Production locations: Brisbane, Queensland
- Running time: 22–24 minutes
- Production company: Light Knights Productions Porchlight Entertainment

Original release
- Network: Nine Network Australia
- Release: 6 July – 30 December 2002

The Shapies is an Australian animated children's television series. Produced by Light Knights Productions, it first aired on 6 July 2002, on the Australian Nine Network and, in the United States, on PBS Kids and Animania. The series originally lasted for 26 episodes, with the series finale airing 30 December 2002.

== Format and premise ==
The series is aimed at children aged five to seven.

It follows the adventures of the Shapies, a rock band consisting of ten different geometric shapes who have always wanted to be the best band in the whole wide world.[3] They emerge from a toy box into the bedroom of a young boy named Zack.[citation needed]

The series also consists of musical parts for each character, sung by Robert and Meika Robertson out of Island View Recording Studio in Coffs Harbour. Each one lasts over 2 minutes.

== Characters ==
- Bob Oblong The self-proclaimed leader of the band, he's also known as The King of Cool. His best friend is Paul. He has been shown to be scared of ghosts in the episode "Boo!". Voiced by Tony Bellette.
- Paul the Ball The silly clown of the band, he laughs a lot and has a ton of energy. His best friend ever is Bob. He gets to "fly" in the episode "Full of Hot Air". Voiced by Jane U'Brien.
- Tammy Triangle The athletic member of the band. She argues with Sally a lot. She won a computer game in the episode "Virtual Shapies". She was found in the episode "Another World". Voiced by Jane U'Brien.
- Rex the Rectangle The pet of the band. Always a carefree dog and plays the drums. Voiced by Jane U'Brien.
- Sarah Circle The second smartest of the group. Thinks of others and is brave such as in the episode "Wet World". Voiced by Joey Moore.
- Sally Cylinder The vain one of the band. Only thinks of her looks and often argues with Tammy, but they repaired their friendship in the episode "Mirror Mirror". Voiced by Joey Moore.
- Sammy Square The smartest of the band. Able to come up with ideas, found in the episode "Talent Quest". He saved the bedroom from goo in the episode "The Day The Goo Came!". Voiced by Jane U'Brien.
- Starry Star The sweet one of the band. She is timid, but is able to overcome it. Found in the episode "The Amazing Maze". She overcame her fear of heights in the episode "Hanging Around". Voiced by Jane U'Brien.
- Perry Pyramid The "chilled-out" member of the band. He is a gentle giant and the last Shapie to be found. He was found in the episode "X Marks The Spot". He has his first idea in the episode "Mr. Boo to the Rescue". Voiced by Tony Bellette.
- Connie Cone The youngest member of the band. She is more quiet than the others. Found in the episode "Circus Day". She befriended Urkel in the episode "The Little Green Men". Voiced by Joey Moore.
- Mirror Man Not a Shapie, but a person who appears on the door after Zack leaves, he is the one that guides The Shapies through their adventures. Voiced by Tony Bellette.
- Mr. Boo Also not a Shapie, but appears in the second season as the main antagonist. He is the toy of Zack's cousin, Chad. His main goal is to get rid of The Shapies, so he can have the bedroom to himself. As the season progresses, he starts to be more friendly towards The Shapies and everyone else. In the season finale, "Mr. Boo to the Rescue", he helps The Shapies escape from a box, and earns their friendship before he leaves. However, he stays because Chad gives him to Zack, when he is put in the toy box along with The Shapies, he smiles, thereby he confirms his new-found friendship with The Shapies. Voiced by Tony Bellette.
- Major Mobile He is an old toy of the room. He first appears in "Hanging Around", where he believes that the Shapies are his new crew. In "The Little Green Men", he thinks Urkel the alien is evil. Voiced by Tony Bellette.
- Zack The owner of The Shapies and future owner of Mr. Boo; he is a kind boy who likes to hang out with his cousin, Chad. Voiced by Declan Steele (George Blackley in Season 1).
- Chad Chad is Zack's cousin and previous owner of Mr. Boo. He only appears in Season 2, where at first, he doesn't think highly of Zack, but as the season progresses, he grows a friendship with him, similar to how Mr. Boo formed a friendship with the Shapies. At the end of Season 2, his holiday is completed, and he gives Mr. Boo to Zack. Voiced by Bonnie Fraser.

== Cast ==
- Tony Bellette – Bob Oblong, Perry Pyramid, Mr. Boo, Major Mobile, Gossip The Clock, TV Head, Toot The Train, T-Rex, Big Bot, Mirror Man
- Jane U'Brien – Paul The Ball, Rex The Rectangle, Tammy Triangle, Sammy Square, Starry Star, Dizzy The Top, Uppity, Lauren, Urkel
- Joey Moore (aka Bonnie Moore) – Sarah Circle, Sally Cylinder, Connie Cone, Fair Bear, Zack's Mom, Snooty
- George Blackley – Zack (Season 1)
- Declan Steele – Zack (Season 2)
- Bonnie Fraser – Chad

== Episodes ==
Series	Episodes	Originally released	
Series	Episodes	First released	Last released
1	13	6 July 2002	5 October 2002
2	14	12 October 2002	30 December 2002

=== Season 1 ===
- Bob, Paul, Sarah, Rex, Sally, Tammy, Mirror Man and Zack appear in every episode.
- Sammy is absent from Episodes 1–2.
- Starry is absent from Episodes 1–5.
- Connie is absent from Episodes 1–8.
- Perry is absent from Episodes 1–12.

No.	Title	Original release date	Prod. code
1	"Another World"	6 July 2002	101
The series begins with Zack (voice of George Blackley) and his sister in Zack's room, where they discover that she has lost five of the Shapies and doesn't know where they are. When they leave, an elderly man on the door blows on the toy box, which awakes Bob Oblong (voice of Tony Bellette), Paul The Ball (voice of Jane U'Brien), Sarah Circle (voice of Joey Moore), Rex The Rectangle (U'Brien), and Sally Cylinder (Moore). Paul finds Gossip the Clock (Bellette) who tells him about Zack and the other humans. Sally discovers Mirror Man (Bellette), who tells her to find her friends and bring them back to him. Bob, Sarah and Rex meet Dizzy the Top (U'Brien), who tells them to clean up. Sarah finds dinosaur pieces and builds all the dinosaurs. The dinosaurs come to life and corner Sally. They discover a dinosaur world beneath the bed and find Tammy Triangle (U'Brien). Meanwhile, Toot the Train (Bellette) gets the remaining Shapies to Dinosaur World. Tammy gets her dinosaur friends to get her friends back home, where they meet Mirror Man, who gets them back into the toy box—until tomorrow that is. Songs: Sally Cylinder, Sarah Circle, and Rex The Rectangle
2	"Bubble Trouble"	13 July 2002	102
When The Shapies cannot get any of the toys to trust them, they discover a bubble maker. Paul The Ball is the first to make a bubble, which gets the others to join. Soon, there are too many and covers the bedroom, and they can't pop them. Sarah is told by Mirror Man to quit, but she refuses. Toot The Train decides to sneeze the bubbles out the window and it works; now the other toys trust The Shapies. Songs: Bob Oblong, Paul The Ball, and Tammy Triangle
3	"Talent Quest"	20 July 2002	103
While most of The Shapies are looking for Sammy (U'Brien), Sally wants to audition for TV Head's (voice of Bellette) new show called Talent Quest. Soon, Bob and Paul are into the idea, and leave to audition. Sarah, Rex and Tammy decide to look at the bookshelf, where they meet a marble looking for his family. Soon, Tammy joins the show, but only to find the other Shapies. Soon, the marbles are dropped and cause everyone to go into a panic. But the good news is that they find Sammy in the bottom of the jar. They then clean up the mess and everything goes back to normal. Songs: Sally Cylinder, Rex The Rectangle, and Sammy Square
4	"Robot Castle"	27 July 2002	104
Bob, Paul and Tammy explore Robot Castle to find their friends, while Sally pretends to be a beauty saleswoman to get free makeup and Sarah and Sammy make small talk. As they go deeper and deeper into the castle, they encounter obstacles and soon find Big Bot (Bellette), who tries to capture them. Sarah, Rex and Sammy go into the castle and reunite with the others as they get out. In the end, they see Sally's ugly makeover and forget to close the door to Robot Castle. Songs: Sarah Circle, Paul The Ball, and Sally Cylinder
5	"Doin' The Robot"	3 August 2002	105
The Shapies find the other toys in a panic as Big Bot and his gang of robots takeover Zack's bedroom. They try to make friends, but it doesn't work, so they try to see Mirror Man, but Rex distracts them, so they go inside the castle, except for Tammy. The Shapies discover Starry's crown and go outside to find Tammy and TV Head filming a music video about the robots, which makes them more friendly and everything goes back to normal. Songs: Paul The Ball, Rex The Rectangle, and Sammy Square
6	"The Amazing Maze"	10 August 2002	106
The Shapies decide to climb to the top of Robot Castle to find Starry. Fair Bear tells them to go in every direction, and to sing along the way. Paul and Rex stay behind. Tammy leads the way, while Sammy puts dots on the wall in order to keep track of their way. Soon, they encounter a bug and hear singing, which turns out to be from Starry (U'Brien), whom they soon find. Paul and Rex use a trampoline to get to the top of Robot Castle after Mirror Man gives some advice to Paul. They help their friends get back home to meet Mirror Man. Then Sarah gives Starry her crown back and now she's complete. Songs: Sarah Circle, Tammy Triangle, and Starry Star
7	"Hanging Around"	24 August 2002	107
Zack decides to put Paul, Sarah, Sally, Tammy and Sammy up on a mobile, where they meet Major Mobile (Bellette), who thinks that they are his new crew. Down below, Bob, Rex and Starry try to help them, but it is Bob who does most of the work, since Starry is afraid of heights. When Bob gives up, it is up to Starry. She talks to Mirror Man, who tells her to help her friends. She gets the courage to fly a plane, in order to get them down, and conquers her fear of heights. They get down, only for Zack to put all of them (except Rex and Starry) back on the mobile. Songs: Paul The Ball, Bob Oblong, and Starry Star
8	"Gobbleguts Gizmo"	31 August 2002	108
When the Shapies discover a pile of robot parts, this gives them an idea to build stuff. Sally and Tammy fight over a piece and Tammy leaves, bitter with Sally. Bob makes a robot, and tries to convince the others that he is in control by feeding the robot, but it only makes him stronger, and soon, it kidnaps Sally while also at the same time falling in love with her. Rex gets Tammy to help Sally, and with Starry's help, saves Sally, and ends their feud, for now. Songs: Sally Cylinder and Tammy Triangle
9	"Circus Day"	7 September 2002	109
In order to find Connie (Moore), the Shapies get clues from a magic crayon, who sends them to a circus. TV Head appears as the ringleader, and gets Big Bot to do a trick, in which Connie appears. A lion nearly gets Connie, but Bob saves her, and it turns out that Rex was the lion. The Shapies take Connie, who is now safe and sound, back home. Songs: Paul The Ball, Tammy Triangle, and Connie Cone
10	"The Day The Goo Came"	14 September 2002	110
When Zack's experiment doesn't work, he asks Sammy to help. When he leaves, he forgets to clean his room, which the Shapies are forced to clean because of Dizzy The Top. Bob and Paul try to hide from cleaning up, and find Sammy with the experiment that Zack was working on. As Dizzy is about to reprimand them, Bob and Paul spill the experiment on the floor. It quickly takes over the bedroom, trapping Dizzy, Sarah, Paul and Bob as a result. After Sammy fails to stop the goo with soap, Sally, Rex, Starry and Connie try to use Toot to stop the goo, but their plan fails, then Tammy tries to use the robots, but it also fails. Sammy uses mirrors to counter the goo, and it works, restoring the room to its former glory. Songs: Starry Star, Sarah Circle, and Sammy Square
11	"The Great Race"	21 September 2002	111
Instead of trying to look for Perry, the Shapies decide to have a car race. Once it begins, Bob and Paul cheat their way through the race, while Sarah and Rex get help from Sammy, followed by Sally letting Tammy do all the work, and Starry and Connie who can't decide whether to go fast or slow. When they reach Robot Castle, most of them make it, except for Sally, who tells them about how beautiful she is. Eventually, in the maze, Bob and Paul decide to cheat, but regret it when they can't find the right path. The race turns badly when Sally crashes in the mud, Tammy crashes into T-Rex and helps him, Sarah gets a flat tire and Bob and Paul crash near the finish line. Only Starry and Connie make it out unscathed after Starry agrees to go slower. In the end, it is Starry and Connie who win, but everyone is a winner when Mirror Man tells them that winning isn't always the way to have fun. Songs: Connie Cone, Paul The Ball, and Sarah Circle
12	"The Case of The Missing Crown"	28 September 2002	112
When Starry finds out that her crown is missing, Bob appoints himself as Detective Oblong and gets Sammy to be his sidekick. Bob points the finger at the toys; first at Dizzy, who tells them that the tape is missing. Then they find Sally with a cardboard crown, and when they decide to take her in, Sammy drops a bag. Bob shows the toys that Sammy's bag was filled with sparkling pieces, which makes Sammy the prime suspect, but it is revealed that Sammy collected it as evidence. Soon, they discover that it is Paul that took the crown, but to fix, not to keep. He gives it back to her, and the crown is fixed on its own. Songs: Bob Oblong, Sammy Square, and Starry Star
13	"X Marks The Spot"	5 October 2002	113
The Shapies discover a treasure map, but split into two groups. Bob, Paul, Sally and Tammy go without any supplies and aren't prepared for anything, while Sarah, Rex, Sammy, Starry and Connie take supplies and have an easier time. Soon, Bob, Paul, Sally and Tammy reach the pyramid and get trapped after trying to take the treasure. When the others reunite with them, they set them free, and get back home, where Perry, (Voice of Bellette) makes a surprise return. Now all the Shapies have been found. Songs: Paul The Ball, Sally Cylinder, and Perry Pyramid

=== Season 2 ===
- Every Shapie makes an appearance in every episode.
- This series marks the first appearances of Mr. Boo and Urkel.

No.	Title	Original release date	Prod. code
14	"The Big Gig"	12 October 2002	201
Now that they are a complete band, the Shapies plan to have a concert in honor of their reunion, but first, they meet Mr. Boo, a toy owned by Zack's (voice of Declan Steele) cousin, Chad (voice of Bonnie Fraser), who wants to get rid of the Shapies. Bob and Paul try to search for Mr. Boo (Bellette) and get tricked into believing that they lost their singing voices. When the concert starts, they can't sing, because Mr. Boo has disconnected their microphones, so the Shapies turn to Mirror Man. He tells them that the only way to prevent them from losing their singing voices is to stop singing. This sends all the Shapies into a singing frenzy, and now that Bob and Paul can sing, the concert goes on as planned. Songs: Perry Pyramid, Bob Oblong, and Rex The Rectangle
15	"Virtual Shapies"	19 October 2002	202
After Zack takes away Chad's computer mouse, Bob and Paul discover a computer, and get tricked by Mr. Boo that they can play a game. Soon, all the Shapies enter the game. The first level involves cyber boards, and Bob gets captured by a black ball. The second level involves jet chairs, and Sammy, Starry and Sally get captured. The third level involves rocket packs, and Perry, Connie, Rex and Sarah get captured. Paul sacrifices himself so that Tammy can reach the final level, where Mr. Boo is. Soon, Tammy defeats Mr. Boo by using Sally's mirror and rescues the other Shapies. Songs: Bob Oblong, Paul The Ball, and Tammy Triangle
16	"Boo"	26 October 2002	203
When the two dolls, Uppity (U'Brien) and Snooty (Moore) come running out of their dollhouse because of a strange noise, Bob, Paul, Sarah and Rex go to investigate. They are soon scared by several noises and ghosts. Then, they discover a secret room, where Mr. Boo is making all the noises. Then the Shapies get their revenge, by scaring Mr. Boo with Sammy's didgeridoo. Songs: Sarah Circle, Rex The Rectangle, and Sammy Square
17	"The Little Green Men"	2 November 2002	204
When the Shapies come out at night, they discover that an alien has crashed into the bedroom. Major Mobile comes to help the Shapies, but Sarah, Sammy, Starry, Connie and Perry go into Robot Castle and meet Urkel the alien (U'Brien), who is trying to get home. Connie is the first to befriend him. After convincing the rest of the Shapies that he is friendly, they help the alien get back to his home planet, by getting Major Mobile to fix his ship. Once Urkel thanks the Shapies for their help, he leaves, disappointing Mr. Boo in the process. Songs: Starry Star, Connie Cone, and Perry Pyramid
18	"Mirror Mirror"	9 November 2002	205
When the Shapies get into an argument, they split up into two groups. Sarah, Rex, Sammy and Perry stay in the bedroom, while Bob, Paul, Sally, Tammy, Starry and Connie go to Mirror Man. But Mirror Man doesn't respond, and when the six Shapies pass through the door, they discover a new world filled with musical tiles. Whenever they step on it, they hear horrible music, and in the bedroom, the rest of the Shapies are hearing bad music too, coming from Mr. Boo. When they find out how to move around, the six Shapies get out of the new world, and find Mirror Man, a part of him at least. When the rest of the Shapies reunite with each other, Mirror Man becomes whole again, and the Shapies hold a concert. Songs: Bob Oblong, Tammy Triangle, and Sally Cylinder
19	"Full of Hot Air"	16 November 2002	206
Once Zack and Chad return from a birthday party, they tie several balloons to the Scaredy Chairs. Then Chad ties one to Mr. Boo. Paul finds a balloon and hangs onto it as it blows out of the window. Sammy gets the rest of the Shapies, except for Rex to get into a balloon ship and saves Paul, but not before Bob gives Sarah and Starry the scare of their lives. While all that takes place, Mr. Boo is floating around, until Rex grabs him so he won't escape, then the Shapies come back home safe and sound. Songs: Paul The Ball, Sammy Square, and Rex The Rectangle
20	"Cheap Tricks"	23 November 2002	207
In an attempt to get rid of the Shapies, Mr. Boo comes up with a plan to become a magician. He gets Sally to be his assistant, and gets Bob and Paul into his Book of Mystery. Then he traps Starry and Connie into his Box of Mystery. Then Sammy and Perry get trapped into the Door of Mystery. Then he tries to trap Sarah and Tammy inside his Pyramid of Mystery, but they escape, with the other Shapies. When Mr. Boo tries to trap Sally and Rex, Rex takes Mr. Boo's Ball of Light, and Sally traps Mr. Boo, saving Rex and redeeming herself. Songs: Connie Cone, Sammy Square, and Sally Cylinder
21	"Shape Up for the Gold"	30 November 2002	208
Zack and Chad go to a sports carnival, but Zack needs Chad's help. The Shapies discover a sports board game, they decide to hold a special event. Mr. Boo tries to enter, but cannot because he is a different kind of toy with either no legs or whatever material the races require. Bob, Sarah and Paul get frustrated, but the rest of the Shapies help them forget about that. Soon, Mr. Boo gets frustrated, but Sally decides to give him her pretend sack, which makes him happy. They have a final race, and everyone crosses the finish line at the same time, so that they can all learn that everyone's a winner. After that, Zack and Chad return, and Zack has won a ribbon, thanks to his cousin. Songs: Perry Pyramid, Tammy Triangle, and Starry Star
22	"Stich Witches"	7 December 2002	209
When a new band called The Stich Witches come into the bedroom, they wreak havoc. First, they invade Robot Castle and kick the robots out, then they threaten to silence the Shapies. Mr. Boo tries to make friends with them, but fails. Sarah decides to talk to the witches and they work out their differences. Then Bob invites the witches to play with them. Songs: Bob Oblong, Paul The Ball, and Sarah Circle
23	"Wet World"	14 December 2002	210
Zack and Chad go to the beach, but Chad doesn't, until Zack convinces him to go, without turning the water off. When the Shapies discover water in the bedroom, they visit the bathroom, where they find Mr. Boo, who is stuck and has lost his Ball of Light in the tub. When they turn off the water, Starry loses her crown, so Bob, Paul, Tammy, Sammy and Starry go into a submarine to dive into the bathtub in search of the crown. Meanwhile, Sarah and the other Shapies rescue Mr. Boo, and Starry finally gets her crown back. Mr. Boo is grateful, but doesn't show it well. Songs: Rex The Rectangle, Starry Star, and Sammy Square
24	"Snow Dome"	21 December 2002	211
During a hot day, Chad gets a snow dome, but isn't interested in it as Zack is. Bob, Paul and Rex find it and find a kind snowman who gets them inside by using their imagination. Soon, all the other Shapies and eventually Mr. Boo go inside. At first, he thinks it's boring, but with a little help from Connie, he soon enjoys himself. When Mr. Boo freezes up, the Shapies hug him for warm in order to use their imaginations to go home. Mr. Boo is thankful for their help, and this time is genuine about it. Songs: Rex The Rectangle, Sammy Square, and Starry Star
25	"The Search For Rudolph"	25 December 2002	212
During Christmas, Songs: Paul The Ball and Starry Star
26	"Once Upon A Shapie Tale"	28 December 2002	213
Zack and Chad go to an audition for a play, but Chad thinks it's boring. The Shapies decide to put on a play, with Sally as the princess, Bob as the prince, Mr. Boo as the evil wizard, Paul as the prince's servant, Tammy as the lady in waiting, T-Rex as the dragon and Starry and Connie as the townspeople. Sarah acts as the director and Sammy is the playwright. Things soon get out of hand when Bob and Sally argue about playing the bigger part. T-Rex scares Starry and Connie after he roars at them during rehearsal. Mr. Boo can't remember his lines, so he decides to rehearse by himself. When the play goes on, Perry tapes Mr. Boo's lines to his Ball of Light, and everything goes as it should, except for the ending, but Tammy saves the play, and the other toys love it. Zack and Chad return home, and Chad gets to play the wizard, while Zack gets to play the prince. Songs: Bob Oblong, Paul The Ball, and Tammy Triangle
27	"Mr. Boo to the Rescue"	30 December 2002	214
After his mom convinces him to put his old toys in a box, Zack puts the Shapies inside. When the Shapies wake up in a strange box, they think that they are in a new home. When Gossip the Clock tells them that they may be sold, they get the idea that Mr. Boo is trying to get rid of them. Tammy, Perry and Sammy try to get everyone out, but they all fail. It is Mr. Boo who gets them out, and they apologize for accusing him of trying to get rid of him, but Mr. Boo reveals that he is going away, and wanted to make friends with them. They accept, and Mirror Man tells them that despite them being far away, they'll always be friends. In the end, Chad goes home, but gives Mr. Boo to Zack. Mr. Boo smiles, thereby confirming his new friendship with the Shapies. Songs: Sally Cylinder, Sammy Square, and Sarah Circle
