= Keynotes =

Keynotes may refer to:

- Keynotes (Australian TV series)
- Keynotes (British game show)
- Keynotes (Canadian TV series)

== See also ==
- Keynote (disambiguation)
