= Quizmania =

British phone-in quiz show

- Quizmania logo
- Created by: Debbie King; Chuck Thomas; Simone Thorogood
- Presented by: Lee Baldry (2005–2007); Lee Clark (2005); Kirsty Duffy (2006, 2008–2009); Stuart Headlam (stand-in); Andy Jaye (2008–2009); Debbie King (2005–2007); Tim Lichfield (2006–2007, 2008); Lottie Mayor (2005–2007, 2008); Nigel Mitchell (2005–2007); Greg Scott (2005–2007, 2008–2009); Chuck Thomas (2005–2006)
- Country of origin: United Kingdom

Production
- Running time: 45–360 minutes
- Production companies: FremantleMedia; Gallowgate Productions (televised version); ScreenPop Ltd. Illumina Digital (online version)

Original release
- Network: Information TV, Life Showcase TV, ITV, ITV2, ITV Play, Men & Motors
- Release: 12 August 2005 – 15 January 2007
- Release: 17 July 2008 – 23 September 2009

Quizmania is a British interactive game show. The show was devised by Debbie King, Chuck Thomas, and Simone Thorogood and produced by FremantleMedia for Information TV (between August 2005 and March 2006) and ITV (between December 2005 and January 2007). Similar to other premium-line call-in shows, viewers on the TV version of Quizmania were encouraged to phone a premium-rate number in order to provide an answer to a quiz question.

Quizmania's last television broadcast was made on 14–15 January 2007, presented by Debbie King and Greg Scott. The show closed with a highlights montage and a farewell sign off from King and Scott.

The series returned briefly on 17 July 2008 as an online-only show on Quizmania's official website.

== Background ==
In 2004, while working for E4 as anchor presenter on the United Kingdom version of the German-produced live phone-in television quiz show 9Live filmed in Munich, presenter Debbie King joined with producers Chuck Thomas and Simone Thorogood to pitch a similar idea to UK production company Nation 217. After commissioning, the show was produced as Bowling For Bucks.

Approached by FremantleMedia, the trio were commissioned to create a similar show called Quizmania. Initially shown in the Autumn of 2005 in a five-hour per night slot on satellite channel Information TV, after 4 months it was picked up by ITV for their night time slot.

E4 continued with a new production team, which transmitted 9Live from late 2004 in the same timeslot as Quizmania, but stopped in early 2005.

== Overview ==
The original run of Quizmania was broadcast from 10 pm to 1 am, weeknights on ITV Play. In order to win money, viewers had to ring in at a cost of 75p from a BT landline (previously 60p). If they were successful they would be placed on hold, then transferred live to the studio if they were selected, where they went on to deliver their answers. Prizes usually ranged from £50 to £25,000. The biggest prize to be won was £28,000 on 22 March 2006. Once £100,000 was available as a prize, but was not won. According to an article in The Times, Quizmania earned ITV over £1.2 million during the first two weeks of transmission on the ITV Network.

The original TV series ended on 14 January 2007, but was revived some 18 months later with a new mass participation online format. The first online series involved trivia games where players attempted to select correct answers to sets of multiple choice questions in the fastest time. The second online series featured additional games from the first such as word searches, anagram solving and maths based games. The revival was short-lived.

=== Broadcast times ===
Quizmania originally began broadcasting on 12 August 2005 on Sky channels 139 (Life Showcase TV) and 181 (Information TV) and completed a three-month run on terrestrial channel ITV from 16 December 2005 to 30 March 2006. After its last show on 31 March 2006, the show became solely shown on ITV as it disappeared from the schedules of the two Sky channels. The series began airing overnight on ITV2 from 1 April 2006. On 26 May 2006, Quizmania returned to ITV, airing on Friday, Saturday and Sunday nights from midnight until around 4 am. The programme also appeared on ITV Play and Men & Motors during weekday afternoons from 3 pm until 6 pm. On 27 August 2006, Quizmania concluded what was to be its last run on ITV and from the week beginning 4 September 2006, began broadcasting exclusively on ITV Play in the evening between 10 pm and 1 am. This arrangement continued until the last edition of the original series on 14 January 2007.

=== TV closure ===
In early 2007, a series of scandals broke out in the UK involving allegations of phone-in segments of television programmes and quiz channels conning viewers. ITV suspended all programmes involving premium rate phone-ins on 5 March 2007, including its quiz channel ITV Play. This was to allow independent auditor Deloitte to conduct a review of programmes carried by ITV including Dancing on Ice, The X Factor and Quizmania which all used phone-ins to generate revenue, to ensure they are run fairly. ITV Play was taken off the air during the review, but for a few days it ran a limited after midnight service for only four hours before on 13 March, ITV announced that ITV Play had been permanently closed down.

=== Online revival ===
The first online series consisted of 26 live shows between 17 July and 4 November 2008. A second, shorter series of occasional shows began on Wednesday 23 September 2009. The programme was available worldwide, although only UK residents were allowed to play for money.

== Crew ==
=== Presenters ===
- Lee Baldry (2005–2007)
- Lee Clark (2005)
- Kirsty Duffy (2006, 2008–2009)
- Stuart Headlam (stand-in)
- Andy Jaye (2008–2009)
- Debbie King (2005–2007)
- Tim Lichfield (2006–2007, 2008)
- Lottie Mayor (2005–2007, 2008)
- Nigel Mitchell (2005–2007)
- Greg Scott (2005–2007, 2008–2009)
- Chuck Thomas (2005–2006)

Stuart Headlam and Chuck Thomas, two of the programme's producers, presented only occasionally. Chuck Thomas's voice could sometimes be heard speaking or giving away clues, when invited by a presenter.

Kirsty Duffy, Tim Lichfield and Lottie Mayor returned for the first series of the online revival alongside former CITV continuity presenter Andy Jaye. Greg Scott returned to present a US election special on 4 November 2008.

== Featured players ==
One of the show's unluckiest players, "Tornado Tom", made it through to the studio on 97 consecutive shows without a single win. He eventually broke his losing streak with a £75 win on 12 December 2006.

On the other hand, regular player "Rob from Norwich" became the show's first big money winner, winning £6,700 on 14 January 2006. Some fifteen months later he went on Sky News to defend quiz TV channels and programmes amid mounting controversy of such output. Stuart King from East Calder was also a big winner in March 2006, winning £8,000.

Crazy Nige rang the studio on a regular basis using his catchphrase, "Loving the style of everything".

== Studio set ==
The Quizmania studio reflected the show's main colour theme, bright pink with elements of blue. In the main section of the studio was a large door, which was set in a low-angled pink wall. This door was where the presenters enter the show from at the start, and sometimes when another presenter arrives to take over.

From the viewer's perspective, to the left of the studio was a bar section, with various odds and ends on it. Going further to the right was a large noticeboard-like wall, which had a large gold frame (nicknamed "Quizframia") where viewer submitted photographs were pinned up. Also in the left section was a flat screen TV, where an animated Quizmania logo was displayed for most of the show. When special events happened on the show (e.g. Double money, speed round), large text was displayed on the screen. The screen was also used to display video clips as part of some games.

To the right of the main section was another main bar section with a flat screen TV in the background, which displayed the same picture as the other TV. The bar had a gumball machine on it, and a large selection of random props and items that viewers sent in. It also had two picture frames, for the "King and Queen of Quizmania". The bar also had some things underneath it that the presenters often got out, but the actual back of the bar was never seen by viewers. Going further right, there was a 'podium of love' (a nickname started by Debbie) that the presenter would 'mount' when a speed round happened. The podium had a backdrop of large white bulb lights on a black background, and the lights were often flashing.

On 31 July 2006, the studio was redesigned into a summer theme. The large door was painted yellow. The left side of the studio was turned into a seaside-like setting, complete with deckchair, bucket and spade, some artificial palm trees, and a barbecue. Meanwhile, the right side was also changed, with the bar given a different colour, and the frame around the TV painted yellow. The podium / speed round area of the studio received new blue and red lights and the podium received a new paint job. Additionally, a large jukebox was placed at the back of the main studio area.

In December 2006, the set was changed again into a snowy, Alpine Lodge theme which was the last theme for Quizmania's run on ITV Play.

A smaller version of the original studio was built for the online series with the technical gallery regularly appearing in-vision.

== Online revival ==
Quizmania was revived as an online-only version. The first publicly released news of plans to revive the series was seen on the Quizmania website, on 18 December 2007 stating: "Yakkabakakkas! Quizmania could be on its way back like you've never seen before!".

On 11 January 2008, those who had signed up to the Quizmania mailing list received an e-mail offering "a huge fluffy pink thank you to everyone for getting in touch." As for the rumours of a return:

Well, it's true we're looking at ways we can bring back the show in a completely different (but hopefully equally wadgetastic) way. It's not 100% certain yet and there are still details we need to scratch our heads over ...

The show finally returned online on 17 July 2008. This show was preceded by a pre-launch pilot edition, which was streamed live on 12 July 2008, with 100 winners of an e-mail competition allowed to take part. The show was originally due to stream every Thursday, Friday and Saturday until 9 August 2008 as a test run. On 31 July 2008, it was announced that the programme would continue beyond that period, although the Friday and Saturday shows were axed at the end of the four-week test run. The final weekly edition of the present series was streamed on 16 October 2008 and was followed by two specials on 4 November 2008 to mark the USA presidential election. The second series of the online revival began at 12 pm on Wednesday 23 September 2009.

Quizmania launched a beta version Facebook application of the show on 8 February 2012 with straight quiz games and guess what the majority of players would choose games. This was closed when makers ScreenPop were merged into ITV Interactive at the start of April 2012.

== International versions ==
The TV format of Quizmania have also been produced and broadcast in various countries.

Country	Title	Network	Host(s)	Date aired
Australia	Quizmania	Nine Network	Katrina Conder; Nikki Osborne; Amy Parks; Suze Raymond; Brodie Young	July 25, 2006 – June 24, 2007
Colombia	Quizmanía	RCN	Valentina Sánchez; Leonardo Millén	2007
France	Quizmax	NRJ 12	?	2007
Poland	Quizmania	Polsat	Dorota Kacprzak; Marcin Mańka	February 28, 2006 – August 31, 2006
Portugal	Quando o telefone toca	SIC	Vanessa Palma; Patrícia Henrique; Raquel Henriques; Iva Lamarão	August 20, 2007 – August 13, 2008
