= The Mint (Australian game show) =

Australian phone-in quiz show

- Genre: Live phone-in game show
- Presented by: Rob Mills; Natalie Garonzi; Angela Johnson; Lyall Brooks; Lucy Holmes; Katrina Conder
- Country of origin: Australia
- Original language: English

Production
- Production location: GTV in Richmond, Victoria
- Running time: 180 minutes Mondays – Thursdays; 240 minutes Fridays and Saturdays (including commercials)
- Production company: FremantleMedia Australia

Original release
- Network: Nine Network
- Release: 31 July 2007 – 29 March 2008

Related
- Quizmania

The Mint is an Australian phone-in quiz show based on the British program of the same name, and broadcast on the Nine Network in selected areas in the late night time slot (post-midnight).

The show was filmed live at Nine's GTV Richmond studios in Melbourne. It replaced Quizmania and was produced entirely by the Nine Network, unlike Quizmania which was produced by FremantleMedia Australia. Like Quizmania, the program received its revenue from phone charges rather than advertisements.

Only contestants aged 18 or over were allowed to participate. Each entry cost a flat 55c charge to a premium-rate 1902 number when calling from a landline.

On 18 March 2008, it was announced that The Mint would be axed. The final episode aired on 29 March 2008.

== Program history ==
The Mint began on 31 July 2007 after the 2007 Big Brother series on Network Ten had ended, with its UpLate late-night show a similar phone-in quiz show.

The Mint was broadcast live on Nine Network stations GTV, TCN and QTQ, and affiliates TVT and NBN. The Mint was seen tape-delayed on NTD in the Northern Territory, with NTD relaying the complete TCN broadcast with Sydney ads, accompanied by a disclaimer stating that "The Mint is not telecast live in the Northern Territory. Northern Territory residents are not able to participate live." This is unlike Quizmania, in which that series was broadcast live in all regions where it was broadcast, including NTD.

Regional affiliate WIN Television commenced broadcast of the programme on 1 October 2007, but axed it in February 2008, stating, "WIN merely wants to provide entertainment to its viewers and in doing so removed The Mint."

The Mint was filmed on a large, extravagant set designed to look like the inside of a mansion. The programme was dogged by criticism that its questions were ambiguous and arbitrary.

== Hosting ==
The Mint was hosted by Australian Idol 2003 contestant Rob Mills, Natalie Garonzi, Angela Johnson, Lyall Brooks, Lucy Holmes and former Quizmania host Katrina Conder. Former Hosts were Cherie Hausler and Nathaniel Buzolic.

Despite there being six hosts, only two were present on the show on any night; the remainder are said to be sleeping in "the Mansion", their name for the studio set which was also used for the short-lived show Commercial Breakdown. The host combination often consisted of one male and one female, performing as a double act, but has also been known to consist of two females. While there were two hosts in an episode, hosts mainly appeared on camera by themselves. The exceptions were during the start of the show, when a prize is won, and at the end of the show. Otherwise, the hosts presented from different rooms within "the mansion".

== Games ==
The namesake of "The Mint" comes from the large vault visible on set. The vault holds a jackpot. Those who correctly guess a three digit combination wins a share of the cash jackpot. There is a 1 in 1000 chance of guessing the code correctly. The prize money in the vault increases each Monday night, however the jackpot was known to be capped at $10,000. Only winners of selected on-screen games are eligible for a single guess at the combination.

In similar style to its British equivalent, cash prizes offered on The Mint are bigger than those previously offered on Quizmania. However, prize winners are less frequent whereas Quizmania had more contestants winning prizes as low as $50.

Examples of on-screen games viewers can call-in to solve include:

=== Criss Cross ===
This game involves filling in one letter in each of four words to form a new word, in the style of a crossword. While there are multiple solutions for each puzzle, there is only one pre-selected solution that will win the contestant money.

=== Quizzle ===
This game presents three sentences on screen, all of which begin with "The number of...". To win the money, the contestant must correctly add the numbers that are in the puzzle. Prize money for this puzzle varies depending on difficulty.

=== Word Search ===
This game involves users trying to find one of the "hot words" in a word search. There are usually six hot words in a grid, each worth approximately $500. This is different from Quizmania in that each word found was worth $50, however much easier to identify and win.

=== Tower Game ===
This game involved players guessing words that are on a tower. Each word is worth an amount of money (between $50 and $500).

=== Code Red ===
How many Reds?
Clown Andre donned
red wigs, powdered
red cheeks and
chequered pants.
Andre danced and
juggled erratically
with thirty red
balloons.

This quiz, called "Code Red" by the hosts, was on the 2 August 2007 episode of The Mint. Viewers were told to find and call-in to tell the host "how many reds" are in the puzzle, with little else to explain how to solve it.

The prize money for this puzzle started at $1000, rising to $2000 within the first ten minutes then a high of $2500 within the next ten minutes, before reverting to $1000 at 167 minutes into the show with 14 minutes left.

Despite the show lasting three hours with numerous contestants calling to offer guesses, no-one gave a correct answer and therefore no prize money was awarded at all for the entire night. At the end of the show they revealed the answer is 80. The answer of 80 can be derived by counting the number of times the word "red" appears (including across spaces and backwards – 9) and the number of characters (including punctuation) in red (71).

=== How many Fives? ===
Another game, called "How many Fives?", consisted of a square grid puzzle on the screen, with each grid square filled with a letter E, V, I, F or the number 5 in a seemingly random fashion. Viewers were told to count "how many fives" were in the puzzle, again with little else to explain how to solve it.

An obvious way for contestants to participate was to count instances of the word F-I-V-E in adjoining squares. Contestants could also have counted the 5 numerals, and potentially even the V letters as Roman numerals, however this was not explained.

=== Beer Monster ===
A more recent game (called Beer Monster by the hosts) involves counting the number of litres that you can see in the on-screen puzzle diagram. Several containers of beer are displayed, together with the amount of beer they can contain. Some containers are partially obscured. The following game was broadcast on the 24 October 2007 episode of The Mint, with a $4000 cash prize offered throughout the 3 hour broadcast:

How many litres?
Beer (27 litres, in a barrel)
Stout (50 litres, in a barrel)
Pilsener (4 litres, in a jug)
Pilsener (4 litres, in a jug) [only the letters 'Pilse' and 'lit' visible]
Pale Ale (1 litre, in a can) [visible]
Pale Ale (1 litre, in a can) [visible]
Pale Ale (1 litre, in a can) [totally hidden except for lid]
Pale Ale (1 litre, in a can) [totally hidden except for lid]
Pale Ale (1 litre, in a can) [totally hidden except for lid]
Pale Ale (1 litre, in a can) [totally hidden except for lid]

After no correct answer was given by viewers, the correct answer was revealed to be 292.

Another example of the Beer Monster puzzle (including screenshot) can be viewed at https://community.livejournal.com/tv_australia/1127087.html

Other variations of this game include counting cents on price tags, and counting numbers (both words and letters)

== Technical difficulties ==
On 16 August 2007 the show finished prematurely after the phone lines went down, requiring hosts Mills and Garonzi to stall the contest and fill-in for 30 minutes. As they could not get the phone lines back up in time, the last 30 minutes of the show's schedule was replaced by a repeat of Keynotes, a short lived game show that aired on Nine in the summer of 1992.

The phone system used for The Mint is run by Be.interactive, formerly known as Legion Interactive – the same provider used for most Australian shows with a telephone call-in or SMS competition entry method, including Quizmania and Big Brother.

On 24 October 2007 the show started without a game to display, as the phone lines were 'down' again.

== Caller Selection ==
Callers are selected randomly by a computer and at random times throughout the episode, including commercials. Should a caller be selected during a commercial break, the answer is taken immediately following the conclusion of the break.

== Terms and Conditions ==
As The Mint is a competition based game show it is run according to a set of terms and conditions. For example, section 38 under the general clause claims that the promoter nor producer is not obliged to provide methods of solution other than information provided by the presenter and any such information is released at the promoter or producer's absolute discretion.

== See also ==
- The Mint Extra
