= Quizmania (Australian game show) =

- Genre: Quiz show
- Created by: Debbie King; Chuck Thomas; Simone Thorogood
- Presented by: Katrina Conder; Nikki Osborne; Amy Parks; Suze Raymond; Brodie Young; Two hosts per episode Mondays – Wednesdays; three hosts per episode on Fridays and Saturdays
- Country of origin: Australia
- Original language: English
- No. of seasons: 2
- No. of episodes: 207

Production
- Running time: 180 minutes Mondays – Wednesdays; 240 minutes Fridays and Saturdays; (including commercials)
- Production companies: Crackerjack Productions; FremantleMedia Australia

Original release
- Network: Nine Network
- Release: 25 July 2006 – 24 June 2007

Related
- The Mint

Quizmania is an Australian phone-in quiz show, based on the British program of the same name, and broadcast on the Nine Network in the late-night time slot (post-midnight). The show was produced from Nine's Richmond studios in Melbourne. Its main director was Rick Maslan.

Quizmania was first broadcast live on Nine Network stations GTV, TCN, QTQ, and NTD, and affiliates NBN and WIN Television on 25 July 2006. The show was unique in that it was broadcast live to South Australia, Western Australia, and Northern Territory with the presenters welcoming SA and NT to the show half an hour after it started, due to those states being thirty minutes behind the Australian east coast, and welcoming WA 2 hours after commencement. Similarly during daylight saving months, Queensland viewers were welcomed an hour later when the broadcast began in that state.

Sometimes due to varying program schedules in each capital city or regional area, some cities and/or areas did not broadcast Quizmania while other cities and/or areas still received the broadcast.

Only contestants aged 18 or over were allowed to participate. Underage callers were a regular occurrence on the show especially during school holidays.

== Programme history ==
When it first aired on Tuesday 25 July 2006, Quizmania was to soon run in direct competition with the established The Up-Late Game Show on Channel Ten, returning a week later on Monday 31 July, after the 2006 Big Brother series had ended with its UpLate late-night show finished. A few days after, Seven Network introduced a similar phone-in quiz show, Midnight Zoo. Both competing programmes soon ceased broadcasting – Midnight Zoo only lasted three months. Quizmania remained on air for the longest period.

During the 2007 Big Brother series, Quizmania faced competition with the return of the UpLate program (see Notable dates).

== Hosts ==
Quizmania originally started out with three hosts, Nikki Osborne, Amy Parks and Brodie Young. In early January 2007, Katrina Conder and Suze Raymond were added to the lineup. On 12 May 2007, Nikki Osborne hosted her last Quizmania show after she announced a few days earlier that she was leaving to work on the new Channel Nine show The Nation with Mick Molloy. Amy now works as a news reporter on Seven News Melbourne.

Two hosts appeared on weekday episodes. On Fridays and Saturdays, there were three hosts due to the four-hour running time.

== Games ==
Some of the games played on Quizmania include:

=== Tower game ===
This game was created by Quizmania in Britain. It consisted of seven blank spaces increasing in value, ranging from anywhere up to $500. At the top of the tower was either be a phrase with a missing word or a topic to guess. For example, one game could be HOT _____, viewers could call in and guess hot weather, hot water, hot pants, etc. Alternatively, the game could be "Boys Names Beginning With T" and viewers could call and guess Trevor, Timothy, Thierry, etc.

=== Word Search game ===
Viewers were to find a certain type of word in a grid. Words were written horizontally, vertically, diagonally or also back-to-front.

Words found in the grid normally won the player $50.

=== Beat the Break ===
Before January 2007, a game took place during the ad-breaks, where they gave the viewers a multiple choice question with two silly answers and the correct answer. Viewers then had to call in during the ad-breaks and, if they gave the correct answer, won $50.

=== The Quizmania Gold Mine ===
This game was first introduced on 4 April 2007 and had two parts to it. The first part is where a viewer calls up and correctly answers a dingbat, a graphic on the screen which features a picture of two different objects (for example, a car and a set of keys). The viewer had to say the correct answer (car keys) to receive $50. Then the viewer got to pick from a wall of 15 gold cards pinned to it numbered from 1 to 15. Some had no prizes behind them, others had Savvytel starter kits (mobile phone credit) or minor cash prizes but only one has the "Gold Mine" which jackpots after each unsuccessful caller until someone picked the numbered card with the "Gold Mine" on it. After that, a tower game was played for the remainder of the episode.

== Incentives ==
Periodically, an incentive to call in was displayed on the screen. One or more incentives may have been offered at any one time. These included:

- A bonus offer, when the next caller or callers would be offered a certain amount of extra cash if they say a correct answer.
- A "speed round", where many calls are taken with reduced banter.
- Caller countdown clocks, where a countdown timer was placed on the screen and the host mentioning that a call would be taken any time from now until the clock hits zero (the length of the countdown clock varied from three minutes to fifteen seconds).
- Double, triple or quadruple the normal amount of money on offer.
- A second guess, where if the first answer mentioned by a caller was wrong, they got to say another answer (this offer was very rare).
- A caller or callers will receive $50 just for getting through to the studio even if they got the answer wrong (this offer was very rare).
- The possibility of receiving a Savvytel mobile phone starter kit with $20 credit (usually given away at random if the producers like the answer given but is not an answer in the current game).

== Notable dates ==
Broadcast date	Notable event
25 July 2006	First episode airs.
3 August 2006	Severe technical problems cause the show to be delayed. (See below)
10 September 2006	Jon English guests to help out viewers with a word scramble.
9 October 2006	Monday night edition moved to Thursday after end of football season. Quizmania now airs from Tuesday – Saturday nights.
19 October 2006	50th episode airs.
23 December 2006	Christmas-themed special airs.
31 December 2006	New Year's Eve special airs – beginning a few minutes early and counting down to midnight in New South Wales and Victoria. GTV-9 and some stations in Victoria join the show late due to celebration broadcast from Melbourne. QTQ-9, NWS-9 and WIN stations in Queensland and South Australia join the show in progress at midnight local time.
4 January 2007	100th episode airs.
6 January 2007	Katrina Conder debuts as host.
7 January 2007	Suze Raymond debuts as host.
11 January 2007	Severe technical problems force the show off-air. (See below)
3 March 2007	Clean Up Australia Day-themed special airs.
14 March 2007	150th episode airs.
15 March 2007	Thursday night edition moved back to Mondays due to the start of the AFL and NRL seasons. Quizmania now airs on Monday-Wednesday, Friday and Saturday nights.
17 March 2007	World's Greatest Shave 2007 themed special airs – highlighting an annual fundraiser by the Leukaemia Foundation.
23 March 2007	Friday night edition no longer carried by GTV-9 Melbourne, NWS-9 Adelaide, STW-9 Perth and TVT Hobart because of NRL coverage.
23 April 2007	Quizmania goes into competition most weekday nights with the return of Network Ten's Big Brother UpLate – which runs for two hours and begins earlier.
9 May 2007	Nikki Osborne announces her upcoming departure from the show.
12 May 2007	Nikki Osborne signs off as Quizmania presenter.
4 June 2007	All five presenters appear in the mob on 1 vs. 100, in an episode recorded before Nikki Osborne's departure. Brodie is the only host still playing and had won $612 so far; he will continue playing until he is eliminated.
12 June 2007	Brodie was eliminated on 1 vs. 100.
12 June 2007	200th episode airs.
24 June 2007	Final episode airs.
31 July 2007	The show's replacement, The Mint, debuts. As with Quizmania, The Mint was also based on a similar British program.
29 March 2008	The Mint airs for the final time – no late-night game shows are being broadcast on Australian television.

== Technical problems ==
On a number of occasions, Quizmania's phone system – ran by Legion Interactive – broke down due to overwhelming numbers of calls, human error, power outages and numerous other causes. Most of the time, the problem was fixed within 5–10 minutes and the show resumed where it dropped off from. There have also been a couple of serious technical problems which have forced Quizmania to cease for the night and be replaced with other programming.

=== Severe technical problems ===
Nikki Osborne and Amy Parks co-hosting while the phones were down.

On 3 August 2006, the show experienced severe technical problems resulting in the current quiz being postponed several times, and presenters Nikki Osborne and Amy Parks ad-libbed for the duration of the breakdown. The show was delayed and alternative programming (two episodes of The Drew Carey Show) was shown instead.

On 11 January 2007, the show experienced severe technical problems again, resulting in the quiz being postponed several times. Again, Nikki Osborne and the production crew ad-libbed through the breakdown, reminding viewers to not call until the problem was fixed. At one stage when the problem appeared to have been fixed and the competition resumed, one woman who called through and gave a correct answer was disconnected before she could give her details to producers. This required Osborne to tell her, on the air, to ring the Quizmania office at Channel Nine the next day to receive her $500 winnings. The show was suspended again, and alternative programming was eventually shown at approximately 1.30 am with Eve followed by The Avengers.

== Axing ==
The show's contract with the Nine Network was not renewed, and the announcement to staff of the end of production was made on 31 May 2007. The 207th and final show was broadcast live on 24 June 2007. Quizmania was replaced by The Mint on 31 July, another quiz show once again taking its title from a UK quiz show of the same name. It was produced solely by the Nine Network, discontinuing the association with Fremantle Media.

== See also ==
- The Up-Late Game Show
- Midnight Zoo
