= The Shirley Abicair Show =

Australian television series

The Shirley Abicair Show is an Australian television variety series which aired in 1958.

The series was produced with the intention of running for nine episodes. Two of the episodes were produced and aired live in Melbourne by station GTV-9, the other seven were produced in Sydney by station ATN-7. In Melbourne it occupied the time-slot previously held by The Astor Show.

Apart from Abicair, other performers who made appearances during the run of the series included singer Jimmy Parkinson, singer Bill McCormack, singer Toni Lamond, singer Ted Hamilton, harmonica group The Three Winds, vocal group The Moontones, violinist Maurice Stead, Arthur Duncan, singer Bill French, The Tunetwisters, Graeme Bell and Bill Newman
