= Face the Nation (disambiguation) =

Face the Nation is an American news interview and panel discussion program that has aired on CBS since 1954.

Face the Nation may also refer to:

- Face the Nation (4Him album)
- Face the Nation (Kid 'n Play album)
- Face the Nation (Australian TV program), a 1958–1959 Australian panel discussion television program
- Face the Nation, an Indian television talk show broadcast by CNN-News18
- Face the Nation, a former Philippine news magazine show, broadcast by GTV Channel 4 in the 1970s.
