= Juke Box Saturday Night =

- Genre: Music
- Country of origin: Australia
- Original language: English

Original release
- Network: GTV-9
- Release: November 1957 – January 1958

Related
- The Astor Show

Juke Box Saturday Night is a short-lived Australian television series which aired on Melbourne station GTV-9 from around November 1957 to January 1958.

The series presented a mix of older and new pop hits. The series featured the cast lip-syncing hit recordings by other artists, in a manner similar to Hit Parade. Such series were eventually rendered obsolete by 1959, due to series such as Six O'Clock Rock and The Bert Newton Show. Notably, the cast included Bob Horsfall, Diana Trask and Susan Gaye-Anderson along with the "GTV-9 Dancers".

Competition in the time-slot consisted of feature films on HSV-7 and varying programs on ABV-2 (depending on the week, this ranged from a feature film, live variety, telerecorded variety, a documentary, and even swimming coverage).

It is not known if any of the live episodes were ever kinescoped, although this is unlikely given the short run of the series, and it is possible (though not confirmed) that the series is lost.

In early 1958 the series became/was replaced with by The Astor Show, which had a format similar to Hit Parade.
