= Binnie Time =

- Genre: Game show
- Presented by: Binnie Lum
- Country of origin: Australia
- Original language: English

Production
- Running time: 15 minutes

Original release
- Network: GTV-9
- Release: October 1958 – April 1959

Binnie Time is an Australian television series, which aired on Melbourne station GTV-9 from c. 2 October 1958 – c. 3 April 1959. The 15-minute weekly daytime series was originally aired on Thursdays, but the last few episodes were broadcast on Fridays.

It is not known if the show was live or kinescoped in advance. The archival status of the series is not known.

Hosted by Binnie Lum, the series was a musical quiz show.

Some episodes featured celebrity guests. For example, Winifred Atwell appeared as a guest in the 30 October 1958 episode, while Corinne Kerby appeared as a guest in the 18 December 1958 episode.

Binnie Lum, who later went by the name Binny Lum, had previously been a host on Thursday at One.
