= Mannequin Parade =

- Presented by: Gretta Miers
- Country of origin: Australia
- Original language: English

Production
- Running time: 10 minutes

Original release
- Network: GTV-9
- Release: 1 June 1957 – 24 May 1958

Mannequin Parade is an Australian television series, or possibly a commercial break/television show hybrid, which aired on Melbourne station GTV-9 from weekly on Saturdays 1 June 1957 to 24 May 1958.

In 1957, Darrods, a now-defunct department store, decided to sponsor two American series, Cross Current and Mr. District Attorney. In-between the series was a locally produced ten-minute segment called Mannequin Parade, which was compered by model Gretta Miers, who was nicknamed "The Darrod Girl" on the series. Half-hour US series in those days ran 25 minutes minus the commercials, so the two programmes along with the 10 minute Mannequin Parade resulted in a 60-minute section of the GTV-9 schedule.

GTV-9 also presented another fashion show, called Lovely to Look At, during 1957.
