= Lucy Holmes =

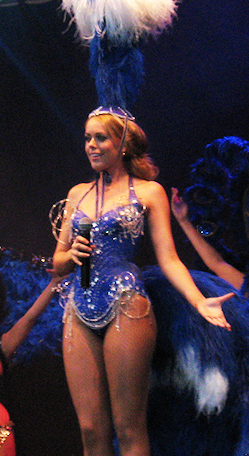

Background information
- Born: Lucy Anne Holmes; 2 July 1979 (age 47)
- Occupations: Singer; Presenter; Radio Host; Writer; Director

Lucy Anne Holmes is a British-born Australian performer, TV presenter, radio host, screenplay writer and director.

She has studied a degree in Music Theatre and has since worked as a professional singer, actress and presenter, recording artist and backing vocalist. She has modelled for companies such as TDK, Rutherfords Jewellery, ME Bank and Shoe Sales.

== 100% Kylie ==
Lucy stars as a Kylie Minogue impersonator in the international hit show, 100% Kylie. The show has toured across Australia, Dubai, Vietnam, Hong Kong, Fiji, New Zealand, Italy, Spain and Singapore. It is the longest running Kylie Tribute show in the world. Minogue herself has called the show the 'Best Kylie act' ever on Twitter.

Holmes has also starred in TV adverts as Kylie, and has performed on many TV shows such as StarStruck, The Footy Show, Postcards, A Current Affair, Mornings with Kerri-Anne, The Morning Show and Battle of the Choirs.

In 2008 Lucy appeared in an episode of Big Brother, appearing briefly as Kylie Minogue in an internal window in the house during the housemates' "Paparazzi" task. This involved housemates having to photograph any "celebrities" (being either images or live impersonators) in the house. Housemates were notified that a "celebrity" was in their presence by the sound of camera flashes being played.

In 2010 Lucy played Kylie on ABC3's Prank Patrol. The episode notes read " Today's prankster, Oakleigh, asks Scotty to her help prank her super-sporty cousin, Danielle. Scotty accepts the challenge and gets to work planning a trip to the laundromat with a special appearance from a Kylie Minogue impersonator, a crazy laundromat lady and problematic washing machines."

In August 2012 Herald Sun broke the news that Lucy was set to play Kylie in the sequel to the Logie winning TV series Paper Giants. The storyline involves the battle between gossip magazines to break news of Minogue's 1989 romance with INXS frontman Michael Hutchence.

== Backing vocalist ==
Holmes has performed with many celebrities as a backing vocalist, including Delta Goodrem, Westlife, UK star James Morrison, Jon Stevens, Natalie Bassingthwaighte, David Campbell, Marina Prior and with Guy Sebastian at the Australian Open Men's Tennis Finals.

Holmes has also performed on many TV shows in house bands – including all three series of Channel 9's recent show, The Singing Bee, and many other shows such as The Logies, Carols By Candlelight, Dancing with the Stars, It Takes Two, Good Morning Australia, the AFL Grand Final and The Good Friday Appeal.

== Television ==
/Since 2008, Lucy has filmed and appeared in many TV commercials, In-store videos and various other Print media and promotions.

Lucy hosted Channel 9's live phone-in game show, The Mint alongside five other hosts before its cancellation on 29 March 2008.

During 2012 Lucy appeared on The Morning Show multiple times as the face of 'Clark Rubber' stores. Holmes promoted the latest foam, rubber and swimming pool products.

In 2013 Lucy appeared on Paper Giants: Magazine Wars (as Kylie Minogue).

In 2018 Lucy was a member of #The100 on the channel Seven version of All Together Now (based on the original seines from BBC).

In 2019, Lucy participated in 'Mrs Australia' and appeared on the Channel 10 show 'Behind The Sash' (the episode featuring Lucy aired on 2 November 2019).

In 2023. Lucy briefly appeared on Helping Hands (episode 28, which aired on July 22, 2023).

== Radio ==
Lucy hosts the breakfast radio show on 89.9 TheLight with Kel McWilliam.

Awards: 3 CMAA Awards (for best radio show) - multiple years.

Awards: 1 CMAA Award (for compelling content) - 2025.

November 24, 2025 is an important date. Lucy & Kel celebrate 3,000 shows (give or take a few days and hours). <<that is approximately Twelve years as the brekky team.
