= The Singing Bee (Australian game show) =

- The Singing Bee Intertitle
- Created by: Phil Gurin; Bob Horowitz
- Presented by: Joey Fatone (2007); Tim Campbell (2008-2010)
- Country of origin: Australia
- Original language: English
- No. of seasons: 4
- No. of episodes: 8+ (list of episodes)

Production
- Running time: 30 minutes (Including commercials)

Original release
- Network: Nine Network
- Release: 7 October 2007 – 2010

The Singing Bee is an Australian game show which is based on the original American version of the same name. By combining karaoke singing with a spelling bee-style competition, contestants have to sing lyrics to songs without making a mistake or risk elimination.

The show premiered on Sunday 7 October 2007 on the Nine Network, which ordered the production of an initial eight episodes. It was filmed at the Nine Network's GTV-9 studios at Richmond, Victoria. The Singing Bee followed the basic rules of the American version of the show but some rule changes have been made for the Australian version.

On 22 March 2008, it was announced by the Nine Network that The Singing Bee would return for a second season, with filming set to take place after the 2008 Logies. Tim Campbell took over as host from Joey Fatone. The season premiered on the Nine Network at 8.30pm on Thursday 10 July 2008. Melbourne radio host Craig Huggins was the announcer and voice over on both seasons.

== Host and singers ==
Former NSYNC singer and host of the original US version of the show, Joey Fatone was announced on 24 September 2007 as the host of the Australian version and was at the time in Melbourne for the show.

It was originally announced that it would be hosted by Australian musician David Campbell but due to other commitments, he was unavailable to host the show. Other media outlets have mentioned that personalities which were being considered for host included Kate Ceberano, Jon Stevens, Michael Falzon, Toby Allen and Rob Mills. The Nine Network held auditions for the series in Melbourne, Sydney and Brisbane.

Out of the four regular singers featured on the show, Rob Mills and Andrew De Silva have been announced as two of them. Lucy Holmes, former host of The Mint is also a regular on the show.

The 2008 and 2010 seasons were hosted by Tim Campbell. Singers in the house band for Season 2 include Nilusha Baeder, Lucy Holmes, Sandii Keenan, Kelly Wolfgramm, Andrew De Silva and Judd Field. The house band was headed up by Dorian West.

== Format ==
At the start of the show, the band plays a song and the host randomly gives audience members a chance to sing part of the song. If they sing along to it enthusiastically, they become one of the six contestants on the show. This section refers to the original format of the show and not the current celebrity series.

=== Round 1 ===
The host provides the year the song was released, the performer, and the name of the song. A portion of the song is performed, and then the contestant has to attempt to sing the next line of the song. If they are correct, they advance to the next round are told to walk over to the "musical chairs" and sit down. If the contestant gets the lyrics wrong however, they have to take a step back, and the next contestant in line must sing the same line of the song. This continues until someone gets it right. If no one correctly identifies the exact lyrics, the answer is given, the song is thrown out, and a new song is put into play. The first four people to correctly sing the given lyric go on to the next round, and the other two contestants are eliminated. For the celebrity edition, the contestants are given points, two for a correct lyric, and zero for a wrong answer. No one is eliminated, but the scores carryover into the next round.

=== Round 2 ===
For round two, the four contestants who advanced through get paired up to play a game chosen at random in each episode from the following games:

==== Karaoke Challenge ====
The contestant sees the words to the song in karaoke fashion, similar to Don't Forget the Lyrics!. As the contestant sings the song, they will see blanks in the lyrics being displayed, each representing a word in the song. The person out of the pair who fills in the most blanks correctly (out of a possible 15) wins and goes on to the third round. If both contestants get the same number of blanks filled in each, a tie-breaker is played. For the celebrity edition, there are 13 missing words. For every word correctly sung, the player is given a point. The player who culminates the fewest points in Round 1 and 2 combined is eliminated from the game.

==== Lyric Scramble ====
While the band is performing, words from the next line of lyrics to a song are shown scrambled on the screen. The contestant is required to sing the words shown, in their correct order. When one contestant is correct and the other is wrong at any point, the one who was correct moves on to the Championship Round. If both contestants are incorrect, a tie-breaker is played, but if both contestant are correct, the round is repeated.

=== Round 3 (Chorus Showdown) ===
The two contestants who advanced through battle each other in a game called the "Chorus Showdown". This follows a similar format to the first round, but instead of singing a line, the contestant is required to sing the entire chorus without making a mistake. If both contestants sing their chorus lines correctly, the round is repeated. If both contestants sing their chorus lines incorrectly, a tie-breaker is played.

=== Round 4 (The Final Countdown) ===
The last remaining contestant who advanced through gets to play in the money round called "The Final Countdown", based on the song of the same name. Up to 7 songs are performed in a similar manner to the first round. For each song, if the lyrics are sung correctly for it, the player wins $5,000. If the player gets five songs right, they win $50,000. However, if they sing the lyrics for a song incorrectly, a strike is given. If three strikes are given (three songs are sung incorrectly) at any point during the round, the game is over but the contestant still wins whatever money was accumulated up to that point, if any. All money round contestants receive a trophy regardless of the outcome.

=== Technicalities ===
==== Tie-breaker ====
Tie-breakers apply only to rounds two and three and are used when contestants get even results while playing the games. In the tie-breaker, the two contestants are given the year and the name of the performer and the first person to answer the name of the song correctly is given the option of singing the song themselves or letting the other contestant sing it. If the singer sings the tie-breaker song without mistakes, they win and move on to the next round. If they make a mistake, the other contestant goes through.

== Production ==
Auditions were held in Melbourne during the weekend of 18–19 August, with some 125 trying out on the Saturday and more the following day. Auditions are done in the style of Round 1 of the show, with five contestants taking turns to complete a lyric of varying degrees of difficulty once the lead-in music stops. Channel Nine's A Current Affair taped a segment on the Saturday, which was then shown on 20 August 2007 to promote the show. Auditions were held in the Temptation studio at GTV-9 in Richmond, Victoria.

== Episodes ==
=== Series 1 ===
==== Episode 1 (7 October 2007) ====
Round Number	Year	Artist	Song
Contestant selection	1983	Cyndi Lauper	Girls Just Want to Have Fun
Round 1	1985	Katrina and the Waves	Walking on Sunshine
Round 1	1982	Men at Work	Who Can It Be Now?
Round 1	1981	Joan Jett and the Blackhearts	I Love Rock 'n' Roll
Round 1	1967	Marvin Gaye	I Heard It Through the Grapevine
Round 2	1981	Toni Basil	Mickey
Round 2	1972	Bill Withers	Lean on Me
Round 2	1997	Aqua	Barbie Girl
Round 2	1979	Little River Band	Lonesome Loser
Round 3	1983	Donna Summer	She Works Hard for the Money
Round 3	1963	Lesley Gore	It's My Party
Round 4 Champion Shane Money won $20,000	1998	Britney Spears	...Baby One More Time
Round 4 Champion Shane Money won $20,000	1979	Mental As Anything	The Nips Are Getting Bigger
Round 4 Champion Shane Money won $20,000	2005	Ben Lee	Catch My Disease
Round 4 Champion Shane Money won $20,000	1980	Blondie	The Tide Is High
Round 4 Champion Shane Money won $20,000	1975	Kiss	Rock and Roll All Nite
Round 4 Champion Shane Money won $20,000	1982	Billy Idol	White Wedding
Round 4 Champion Shane Money won $20,000	1978	Gloria Gaynor	I Will Survive

==== Episode 2 (14 October 2007) ====
Round Number	Year	Artist	Song
Contestant selection	1980	The Romantics	What I Like About You
Round 1	1981	Rick Springfield	Jessie's Girl
Round 1	1979	The Pretenders	Brass in Pocket
Round 1	2005	Pussycat Dolls featuring Busta Rhymes	Don't Cha
Round 1	1985	Bananarama	Venus
Round 2	1983	Billy Joel	Uptown Girl
Round 2	1964	The Drifters	Under the Boardwalk
Round 2	2001	Kasey Chambers	Not Pretty Enough
Round 2	1987	Crowded House	Something So Strong
Round 3	1979	Robert Palmer	Bad Case of Loving You (Doctor, Doctor)
Round 3	1981	The Go-Go's	Our Lips Are Sealed
Round 4 Champion Glenn Money won $50,000	1978	John Paul Young	Love is in the Air
Round 4 Champion Glenn Money won $50,000	1980	Blondie	Call Me
Round 4 Champion Glenn Money won $50,000	1983	Pat Benatar	Love Is a Battlefield
Round 4 Champion Glenn Money won $50,000	2005	Bernard Fanning	Wish You Well
Round 4 Champion Glenn Money won $50,000	1988	The Bangles	Eternal Flame
Round 4 Champion Glenn Money won $50,000	1977	Bonnie Tyler	It's a Heartache

==== Episode 3 (21 October 2007) ====
Round Number	Year	Artist	Song
Contestant selection	1987	Kylie Minogue	The Loco-Motion
Round 1	1982	Hall & Oates	Maneater
Round 1	1983	Cyndi Lauper	Time After Time
Round 1	1991	Nirvana	Smells Like Teen Spirit
Round 1	2003	Delta Goodrem	Lost Without You
Round 2	1990	Heart	All I Wanna Do Is Make Love to You
Round 2	1996	Savage Garden	Truly Madly Deeply
Round 2	2004	Kelly Clarkson	Since U Been Gone
Round 2	1981	Christopher Cross	Arthur's Theme (Best That You Can Do)
Round 2	1996	R. Kelly	I Believe I Can Fly
Round 3	1984	Madonna	Like a Virgin
Round 3	1998	The Goo Goo Dolls	Iris
Round 3	1991	Billy Ray Cyrus	Achy Breaky Heart
Round 3	1973	Billy Joel	Piano Man
Round 3	1971	Daddy Cool	Eagle Rock
Round 4 Champion Melanie Money won $15,000	1975	Queen	Bohemian Rhapsody
Round 4 Champion Melanie Money won $15,000	1979	The Police	Every Breath You Take
Round 4 Champion Melanie Money won $15,000	1992	Whitney Houston	I'm Every Woman
Round 4 Champion Melanie Money won $15,000	1988	The Bangles	Walk Like an Egyptian
Round 4 Champion Melanie Money won $15,000	1964	The Kinks	You Really Got Me
Round 4 Champion Melanie Money won $15,000	1980	The Romantics	What I Like About You

==== Episode 4 (28 October 2007) ====
Round Number	Year	Artist	Song
Contestant selection	1999	Vanessa Amorosi	Absolutely Everybody
Round 1	1984	The Bangles	Manic Monday
Round 1	1975	Rocky Horror Picture Show	Time Warp
Round 1	1985	Mr. Mister	Broken Wings
Round 1	1987	Kylie Minogue	The Loco-Motion
Round 2	1987	Belinda Carlisle	Heaven Is a Place on Earth
Round 2	1984	Mondo Rock	Come Said the Boy
Round 2	1982	Eurythmics	Sweet Dreams (Are Made of This)
Round 2	1997	Sixpence None The Richer	Kiss Me
Round 3	1975	ABBA	Dancing Queen
Round 3	1979	Kiss	I Was Made for Lovin' You
Round 3	1970	Rod Stewart	Maggie May
Round 4 Champion Sarah Money won $50,000	1980	Cold Chisel	Cheap Wine
Round 4 Champion Sarah Money won $50,000	1978	Olivia Newton-John and John Travolta	You're The One That I Want
Round 4 Champion Sarah Money won $50,000	1987	The Choirboys	Run To Paradise
Round 4 Champion Sarah Money won $50,000	1997	Shania Twain	Man! I Feel Like a Woman!
Round 4 Champion Sarah Money won $50,000	1965	The Righteous Brothers	Unchained Melody
Round 4 Champion Sarah Money won $50,000	1982	John Cougar	Jack And Diane
Round 4 Champion Sarah Money won $50,000	1977	Status Quo	Rockin' All Over the World

==== Episode 5 (4 November 2007) ====
Round Number	Year	Artist	Song
Contestant selection	1990	John Farnham	Chain Reaction
Round 1	1991	Jimmy Barnes	Ain't No Mountain High Enough
Round 1	1982	The Waitresses	I Know What Boys Like
Round 1	1975	KC and the Sunshine Band	That's the Way (I Like It)
Round 1	1968	Dusty Springfield	Son of a Preacher Man
Round 2	1985	Madonna	Material Girl
Round 2	1973	Steve Miller Band	The Joker
Round 2	1964	Petula Clark	Downtown
Round 2	1982	Culture Club	Do You Really Want To Hurt Me?
Round 3	1977	Queen	We Are The Champions
Round 3	1997	John Farnham and Human Nature	Every Time You Cry
Round 4 Champion Vanessa Money won $0	1968	Tammy Wynette	Stand By Your Man
Round 4 Champion Vanessa Money won $0	1964	Roy Orbison	Pretty Woman
Round 4 Champion Vanessa Money won $0	1993	Dannii Minogue	This Is It
