= Astor Radio Corporation =

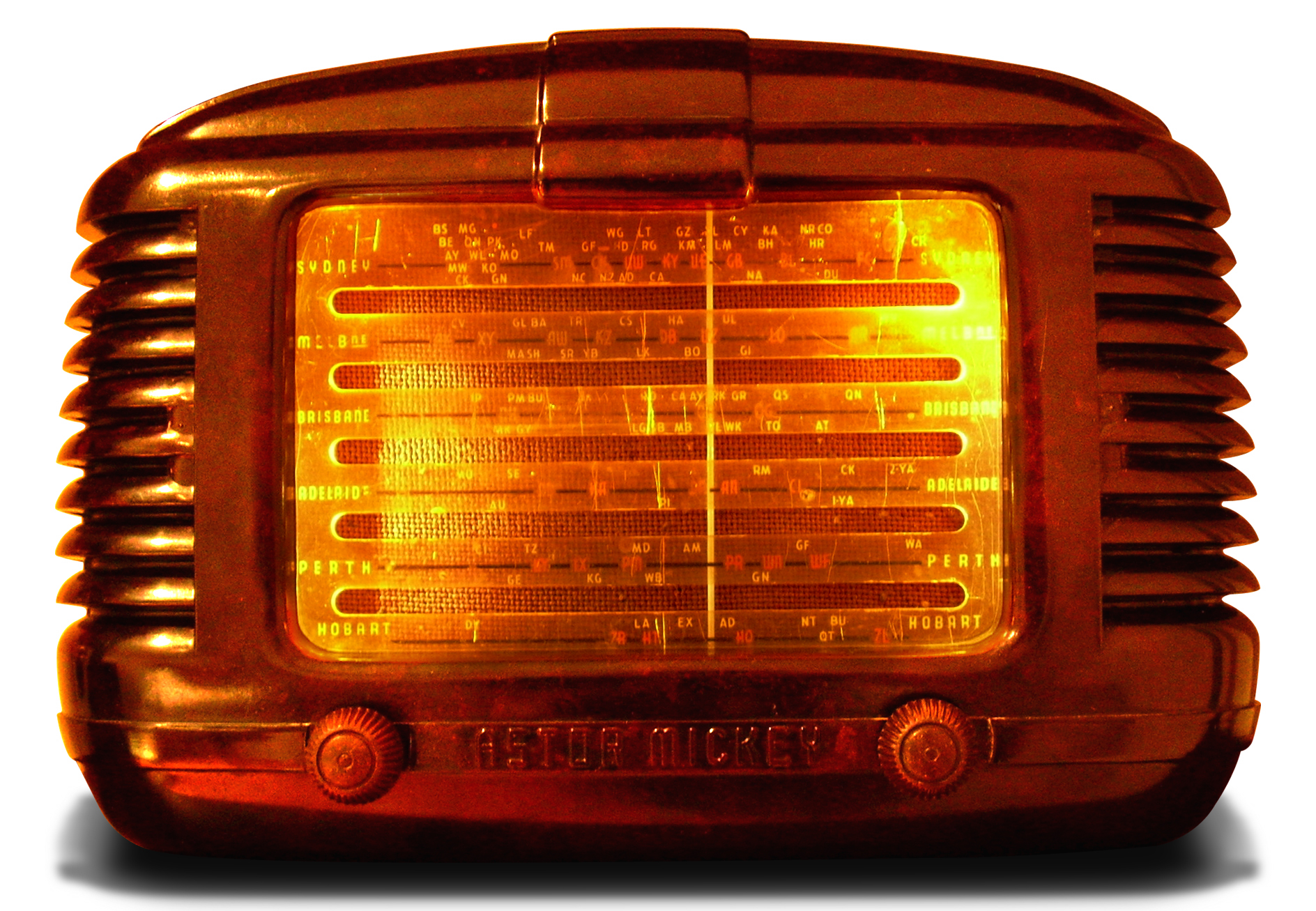
Astor Mickey, 1946

Astor - Radio Corporation - Electronic Industries was the largest Australian electronics manufacturer, manufacturing across the retail sector of products from Washing Machines to Radio. Astor, which began operating in 1926, making electronics in Victoria was founded by Arthur Warner. The firm was innovative in that it offered radios in dynamic designs and colours compared with the conservative designs offered by other companies.

Astor bought its competitors, Eclipse and Essanay. Originally a partnership between successful tobacconist Louis Henry Abrahams and Sir Arthur Warner, it was taken public in 1940, with the original partners holding 50 per cent of the new company. However, in 1956 the partners sold the majority stake to the English electronics company Pye Ltd, and Pye was later taken over in 1966 by the giant Philips electronics company.

== Astor ==
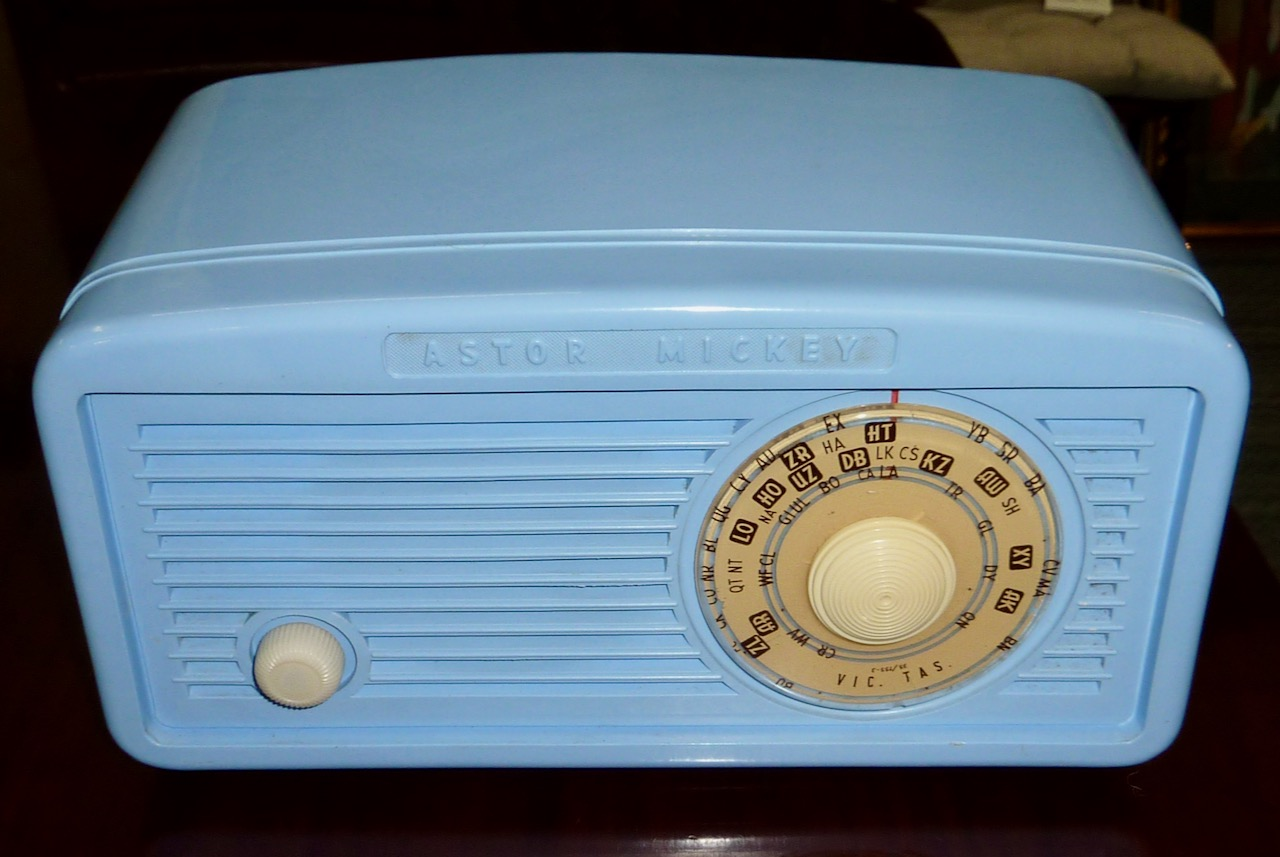
Pale blue bakelite Astor Radio circa 1950s

Astor produced TVs, radios, washing machines, tumble dryers, and other white goods for the Australian domestic market, borrowing from design patents from other overseas companies products with the understanding that the companies' free use of these in production and consumer markets would not become more ambitious than the local Australian market share. Astor produced a controversial Mickey Mouse radio, becoming embroiled in a long-running court battle with Disney over the use of the Mickey Mouse name and logo. The result was that Astor was forbidden to use the name "Mickey Mouse" for its radios, but it continued to produce the “Astor Mickey" radio for the next 16 years.

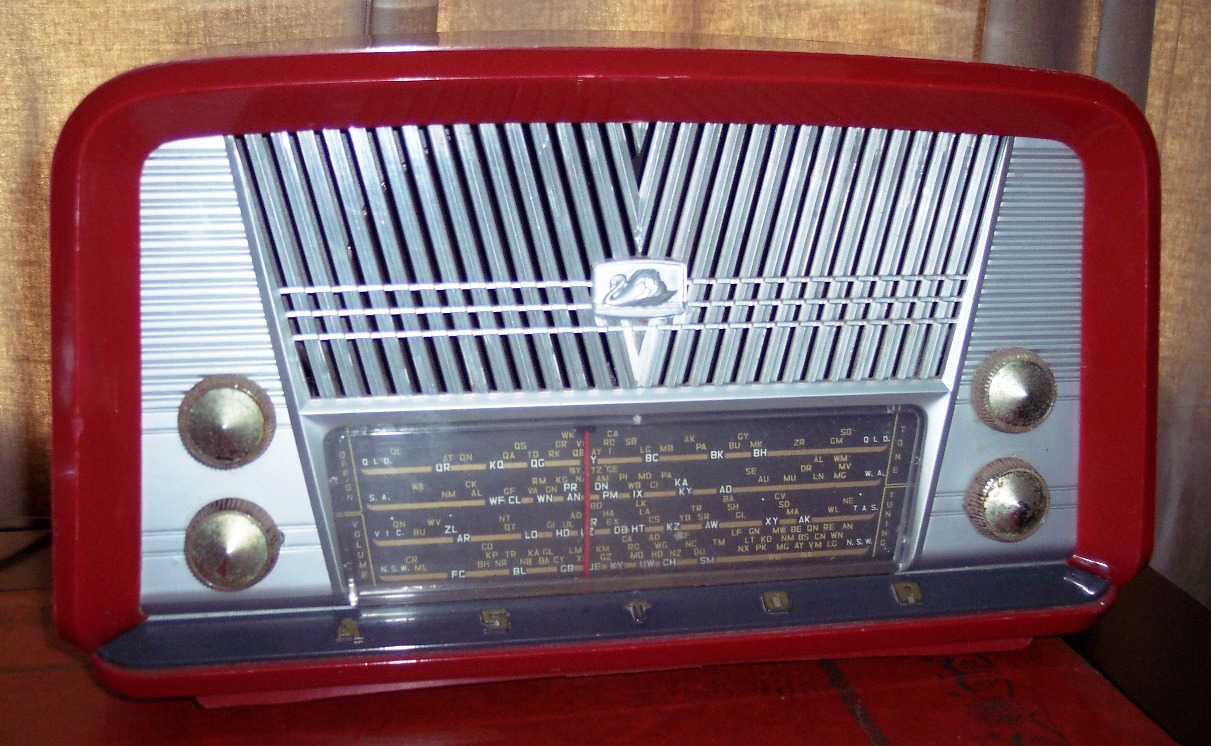
Astor BPJ 5 valve, 1959

Astor's demise began in earnest in about 1970 as the company was turning a corner. It had been absorbed fully into Philips with a buy-out and had clearly started moving its manufacturing to Clayton from its South Melbourne factory. The daily organiser known as Miss Hurley who was in print for all jobs advertised at the firm at Grant Street, South Melbourne ended. Mr Wood was the employee person of contact in the Clayton premises and records reflect that by 1971 all Astor dealings were from the Clayton location with all manufacturing advertising referring to Clayton.

Archives reflect that a very sudden end to jobs advertised at Astor, better known as Electronic Industries at this stage (EIL, Radio Corporation). This occurred sometime in 1972. By the beginning of 1973, Radio Corporation (EIL) had ceased to exist. This occurrence reflects a sudden end of local production had come into effect under the Astor brand. Hundreds of regular employment advertisements by Radio Corporation in 1972 which advertised for solderers, product designers, sprayers, and plastic moulders had very abruptly stopped by 1973. Astor refrigeration and freezers were advertised until 1975 perhaps reflecting that Philips had begun winding back the brand. From 1975 Astor had become but a label applied to imported goods under Phillips control. Astor was not unique in this respect as large scale Australian manufacturing had receded to the point whereby components companies were all closing their doors due to Tariff reduction legislation implemented by the Whitlam government. The head of Philips Mr Huye of Holland had seemingly been quite aware and proactively warned the government of the time about “complete collapse of Australian manufacturing” as we knew it. History would prove he was correct.

From 1973, only the Astor Music Division continued from the same company location in Clayton where manufacturing had taken place. This was probably due to the fact that Philips had by now decided to rest the Astor brand by this date, replacing it with the Philips branding. Advertisements for music developers and experts in vinyl pressing were sought. The most famous release by this date was "Joe Dolce - Shuddup-You-Face" from 1981 under the Astor label - of Lygon Street, Melbourne fame. This record reached number 1 on the Australian music charts and was the final vinyl pressing from Astor and unceremoniously heralded the end of the brand, consigned to history. Astor was taken over by PolyGram in October 1981,[1] and its manufacturing facility in Melbourne closed on 31 December 1981 and the company ceased to exist.[2]

In the 1970s as discussions were looming about the proposed tariff reduction scheme and what this would mean for Australian manufacturing Mr Huye (Philips of Holland) featured predominantly in the media discussing the 25% tariff reductions, trying to pressure the government not to look for cheap colour TV sets from Japan but to invest locally by increasing protections to the local industry so the industry could compete and adjust before any reductions could take place. After Philips took hold of Astor, the Australian consumer electronics landscape would see the manufacturing arrangements collapse overnight in a very short time. A company offering “employment with career progression" which was touted in advertisements for positions at Astor / Radio Corp swiftly ended. Skilled welders, solderers, and wiring experts (who could follow diagrams) who were previously sought for in the hundreds, in the papers, would all lose their jobs. In 1972 Astor completely vanished from the employment section of the newspaper database under Radio Corporation (EIL).

Electronic Industries continued to produce its fridges and dryers up to 1974 from its Clayton plant, however, a news article from Mr Huye of Philips cites the tariff reduction scheme of 25% in 1973 as the reason workers would be laid off in stages in 1973/4. However, it seems that the company manufacturing had almost certainly ended completely by 1973. It may have been an early decision by Huye to shut down the radio and television manufacturing first as the Australian manufacturing landscape made the investment in colour TV manufacturing untenable. Some alarm clocks and transistor radios bearing the Astor logo appeared in the late 1970s marketed by Phillips but were produced in low-wage countries like Hong Kong and ultimately it was decided to drop subsidiary trademarks like Astor as Philips streamlined its product offerings into Phillips.

Astor House in Grant Street, South Melbourne was being sublet by 1974 to office space - perhaps vacated by Astor/Radio Corporation. It was noted in a news article that receivership meetings were being held here by then, with no other affiliation with Astor other than that the meetings took place at Astor House in South Melbourne. By the late 1970s, the Astor name had been removed from the building and the famous name had vanished from the domestic appliance market completely.

The local electronics industry had completely disappeared by 1980, with none of Astor's or any subsidiary of EIL/Philips' factories in operation by the end of the 1970s. After the local production of Astor TV and radio units ceased along with other local manufacturing, the speaker factories also went out of business. Plessey-Rola, the producer of locally manufactured speakers became a victim of the chain and link effect and closed its doors in 1975. They decried that as soon as a cheaper alternative was available from Japan their market share was too small to be viable.

"As engineering manager I was saddened, disappointed and devastated to witness the closure of the loudspeaker manufacturing division such an icon in the Australian audio and manufacturing industry. Plessey / Rola ceased production of loudspeakers in Australia in 1975. Tariff protection had been significantly reduced in 1973 with the result local manufacture of audio products and customers diminished, car manufactures opted for cheaper imported loudspeakers demand for local manufactured speakers diminished making speaker production on the grand scale we were accustomed to was no longer viable overnight." - Rola Employee Statement.

== Television ==
The Astor radio corporation was a major manufacturer of early monochrome television sets in Australia, commencing production in 1956 in anticipation of services in Melbourne and Sydney. Between 1969 and 1971, Electronic Industries engineers, Willem Sparrius and Ian Maskiel, developed an early domestic colour television set under the Astor brand. ~400 units were produced for training purposes.

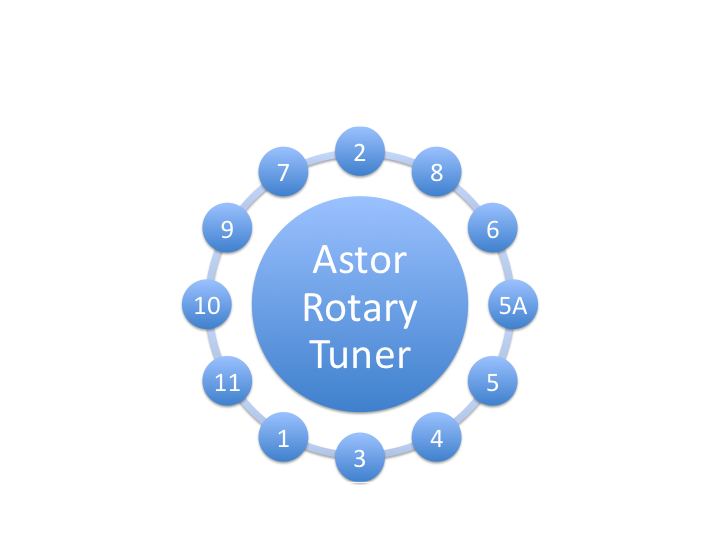

Some early Astor television sets featured a rotary dial that located the available channels adjacent to each other, rather than in numerical order, especially for the capital cities which were allocated channels 2, 7 and 9.

Channel 0 was not included, possibly because the tuner mechanism could only accommodate 12 places. As a result, in Melbourne 1964 (and later in Brisbane), service technicians were required to convert the place marker for either channel 10 or 8 to receive Channel 0, which is evidence of the significant problems that ATV0 had at its commencement. Channel 10 could not be used in Melbourne at the time because that would have resulted in interference with the regional station (GLV10). Brisbane had a similar problem a year later with a nearby regional station in Toowoomba DDQ10. That was not a problem in Sydney or Adelaide, where the channel 10 frequency was used by the 0/10 Network.

The company sponsored an early Australian television series, The Astor Show, which aired in Melbourne during 1958, and also sponsored a Sydney television series, Astor Showcase, from 1957 to 1959.

Television models produced include:

- Astor TV - Model TD 059

== See also ==
- Astor Records
- The Astor Show
- Astor Showcase
