= Betty McQuade =

- Birth name: Elizabeth Rankin McQuade
- Born: 26 August 1941; Paisley, Scotland, UK
- Died: 26 December 2011 (aged 70); Brisbane, Queensland, Australia
- Genres: Rock and roll, pop
- Occupation(s): Singer, dancer
- Years active: 1956–2007
- Labels: Astor, Golf

Elizabeth Rankin McQuade (26 August 1941 – 26 December 2011), known as Betty McQuade, was an Australian rock and roll and pop singer.

== Biography ==
Born in Paisley, Scotland, McQuade moved to Australia with her family at the age of eight, settling in Brisbane. She began singing in talent shows and in clubs such as Cloudland, winning a major talent show at Brisbane City Hall in 1956 when she was 15. Her club appearances became more frequent, appearing on bills with Johnny O'Keefe and the Bee Gees, and she featured in TV shows both as a singer and dancer. She moved to Melbourne in 1960, and joined an existing group, The Thunderbirds, replacing Judy Cannon.

The following year she signed with Astor Records as a solo singer, releasing her versions of Wanda Jackson's recording "Tongue Tied" and John D. Loudermilk's "Midnight Bus", on which she was backed by the Thunderbirds. The latter song reached most regional charts in Australia, has been reissued there several times, and was later voted in a newspaper poll as the #1 rock song of the 20th century in Australia. Loudermilk himself described McQuade's recording as the "definitive killer version" of the song.

McQuade appeared regularly on Australian TV shows through the early 1960s. In 1962 she joined with the Premiers and released her final record on the Astor label, "Bobby, Bobby, Bobby". She then joined the Go!! label, who reissued "Midnight Bus" and a further single, "Blue Train". She returned to Queensland in 1966, and performed regularly in clubs, widening her repertoire to include pop standards and ballads. She retired in 1968 and married, but after that ended she returned to singing in small clubs. In 1983, she returned to Melbourne and began performing at rock and roll revival events as well as guesting on TV shows. She continue to perform into the 2000s, until her final performance on 22 September 2007.

She died in Brisbane on 26 December 2011, aged 70, after a long illness. A compilation of her recordings, entitled Betty McQuade Collection, was issued on CD in 2012, with all revenue going to a charity in support of entertainers.
