= Bongo (Australian TV series) =

- Genre: Music television
- Presented by: Russell Stubbings
- Country of origin: Australia
- Original language: English

Production
- Running time: 30 minutes

Original release
- Network: GTV-9
- Release: 18 August – 17 November 1960

Bongo is an Australian television series for which little information is available. Hosted by Russell Stubbings, it was a music show aimed at teenagers. It ran from 18 August 1960 to 17 November of the same year. It was a half-hour series, aired on Melbourne station GTV-9 (Australian television was not fully networked at the time). The series was preceded on the schedule by Gerry Gee's Happy Show and followed by the evening news. An issue of The Age newspaper features a picture of Stubbings and lists the series as being live.
