= Hillbilly Requests =

- Genre: Music/variety
- Presented by: Tom Campbell
- Country of origin: Australia
- Original language: English

Production
- Running time: 25 minutes

Original release
- Release: 1957 – 1958

Hillbilly Requests (originally Hillbilly Request Time) is an Australian television series, which ran from 1957 to 1958 on Melbourne station GTV-9. Representing an early effort at music/variety programming by the station, it was hosted by Tom Campbell and each episode featured the Victoria Banjo Club. The program had an unusual running time of twenty-five minutes as opposed to the usual thirty minutes. Originally aired at 6:30PM, it spent most of its run at 6:15PM, running to 6:40PM, preceded by the Happy Show and followed by the evening newscast with Eric Pearce. The archival status of the series is not known.
