= Open House (1957 TV series) =

- Genre: Magazine
- Presented by: Jim Wood; Jane Edwards; Peter Lunn; Hal Todd; Gretta Miers
- Country of origin: Australia
- Original language: English

Production
- Running time: 60 minutes

Original release
- Network: GTV-9
- Release: 25 August 1957 – 6 April 1958

Open House is an early Australian television series, which aired on Melbourne station GTV-9 from 25 August 1957 to 6 April 1958. The hour-long series aired at 4:45PM on Sundays, and was replaced on the schedule with In Melbourne Today. Like most early Australian series, the series aired in only a single city.

Presenters on the series included Jim Wood, Jane Edwards and Peter Lunn, and Hal Todd, with Gretta Miers appearing on the last few episodes. Todd and Miers continued onto In Melbourne Today.

The series was of a magazine-format, with interviews, music and guest artists.
