= Amy Parks =

Australian journalist and broadcaster (born 1982)

- Born: 10 June 1982 (age 44); Melbourne, Victoria, Australia
- Occupations: Journalist, television presenter, singer
- Years active: 1999−present

Amy Parks (born 10 June 1982) is an Australian journalist and broadcaster. She is a reporter for Seven News Melbourne from Melbourne. Parks was one of the original hosts of Nine Network's late night interactive quiz show, Quizmania (2006–2007). She was a reporter on Nine News Melbourne in 2008, before switching to rival network, Seven.

== Early years ==
Parks was born on 10 June 1982. She was raised in West Sunshine and Horsham until her family moved to the Bellarine Peninsula when she was 13. She joined a junior Geelong theatre society and Matthew Flinders Girls Secondary College's jazz group. Parks was a singer in the school-based band, Sweethearts of Swing, and toured overseas.

== Television ==
After being accepted to RMIT's Bachelor of Journalism course, Parks became very involved in community television, taking on the hosting role for three seasons of Raucous (a live-to-air music show), was the TV reporter on Darren & Brose, and also became both producer and presenter of Newsline and Pluck. It was during her time at RMIT that Parks was asked to join the team at Fox Footy and present 26 episodes of Young Guns, a show focusing on the lives and careers of young footballers.

Returning to university after Fox Footy, Parks finished her degree whilst doing various freelance journalism and presenting activities. These included work at The Age newspaper, Media Giants and the Essendon Football Club, as well as hosting Channel 31's Real Time Racing, and conducting a series of interviews over three years at the annual Falls Festival for a historical DVD.

Parks' next project saw her presenting a children's DVD, Talking Time, released commercially September 2006 in Australia, Canada, USA and NZ. In this role, Parks played beside a collection of puppets in a DVD that is aimed at increasing parents' awareness of the importance of instilling good speech practices in their children.

=== Quizmania ===
In July 2006, Parks was one of the original hosts of the Nine Network late-night phone-in quiz show, Quizmania. Her co-presenters were Brodie Young (ex-Big Brother intruder) and Nikki Osborne (an actress).

=== Media career ===
In 2008, Parks joined Nine News Melbourne as a reporter; prior to becoming a reporter, Amy was a producer.

In 2009, Parks moved to Seven News Melbourne as a reporter. She was one of the Geelong Cup Ambassadors, with Geelong footballer Steve Johnson, in 2010.

In 2013, Parks relocated to the United Kingdom and continued reporting for Seven News and Sunrise from London. She covered many major entertainment stories including the Mission: Impossible and James Bond: Spectre premieres as well as world news stories such as the death of the Duke of Edinburgh and the death of Queen Elizabeth II.

She was also part of the 7 Sport on air team for the 2022 Commonwealth Games in Birmingham.

In 2019, Parks and her longtime producing partner Kristy Fuller of 1440 Productions were awarded the MiPFormats award at Cannes Film Festival for Best New Format.

Parks currently manages the UK operations for the world's largest equestrian online streaming service, ClipMyHorse.TV and is a host and producer for the platform's prime time studio show "In/Out".

Parks is a keen equestrian and competes in the sport of showjumping at international level, representing Great Britain.
