= Binny Lum =

Australian radio and TV host

- Binny Lum photographed in London 1964, during her international tour where she interviewed The Beatles
- Born: Rowena Bernice Lum; 2 February 1915; Adelaide, South Australia, Australia
- Died: 1 November 2012 (aged 97)
- Occupations: Radio Presenter, TV Host
- Years active: 1931-1984

Binny Lum born Rowena Bernice Lum earlier known as Binnie Lum (2 February 1915 - 1 November 2012) was an Australian musician, poet and actor radio and TV host and documentarian, of part Chinese heritage. She was best known for her numerous (around 150) oral history recordings with numerous celebrities, including stars of international stage and screen, like Vivian Leigh and Charlton Heston as well as music icons and artists, including The Beatles, Barbra Streisand and Fred Astaire and notable historical figures like Edmund Hillary.

In the early days of Australian radio, alongside such stars as Queenie Ashton, Gwen Plumb, Ethel Lang and Margaret Christensen Lum was a pioneer for woman in broadcasting.

== Biography ==
=== Early life ===
Lum was born Rowena Bernice Lum in Adelaide, South Australia in 1915 to a Chinese father, Lum Yow, who was a practitioner of natural Chinese medicine and an Australian mother, Elenora Laker. Due to her mixed heritage she was unable to go to school in her home town of Adelaide so settled in Melbourne, where she had more luck being enrolled at Presbyterian Ladies College.

She trained at Nora Stewart's dance school, alongside such luminaries as Robert Helpmann, and teamed up with another pupil Girlie Powell too sing and dance at various venues. On the strength of her compositions, she was initially looking to take up a scholarship to attend the Conservatorium of Music.

== Career ==
At the age of 16 she published a book called Poems.

Lum started her career in theatre with the Brighton Repertory Theatre, and first appeared on radio at 3XY in a play, continuing on as an actor, accompanist, scriptwriter and compere, for their numerous productions. She subsequently worked with 3AW.

In 1951 she joined 3KZ presenting the children's session, where she was billed as "Cousin Binnie" taking over the role from Florence "Dot" Cheers (the broadcasting wife of singer Smoky Dawson) and in 1953 worked at 3DB presenting the morning session.

She subsequently moved into television broadcasting. In 1957 she hosted a live show aimed at women, Channel Nine's Thursday at One with Binnie Lum; it ran until 1960 and was described by the network prior to the era of Mike Walsh and Ray Martin as their first daytime television programme.. She went on to host her own half hour daily program Binnie Time

She continued in radio, interviewing many celebrities and in 1964 travelled abroad to conduct many more interviews, notably including The Beatles.

In 2013 a collection of over 100 of her interviews were added to the National Film and Sound Archive of Australia's Sounds of Australia collection.
