= Astor Showcase =

- Genre: Variety
- Country of origin: Australia
- Original language: English

Production
- Producer: Frank Strain

Original release
- Network: ATN-7
- Release: 1957 – 1959

Astor Showcase is an Australian television variety series which aired from 1957 to 1959 on Sydney station ATN-7.

As the title suggests, it was sponsored by Astor Radio Corporation. The producer was Frank Strain. The orchestra was conducted by Tommy Tycho.

An edition broadcast on 26 April 1958 had an ANZAC theme, presenting songs made popular during the two world wars. An episode broadcast on 15 September 1958 was recorded in Melbourne for Sydney broadcast, and featured Graham Kennedy and Panda Lisner. The edition broadcast on 27 December 1958 had the theme of "Hits of 1958", featuring Margaret Day, Harold Rugless, Neil Williams, Nola and Olive Lester, Barry Davies, and Charlie Parker.

== See also ==
- Astor Radio Corporation
- Astor Records
- The Astor Show
