= Boomerang (Australian TV program) =

- Genre: Daytime television
- Presented by: Sybil Francis
- Country of origin: Australia
- Original language: English

Production
- Running time: 30 minutes

Original release
- Network: GTV-9
- Release: 1961 – 1962

Boomerang is an Australian television program which aired from 1961 to 1962 on Melbourne station GTV-9. A daytime program, it was hosted by Sybil Francis, and aired in a 30-minute time-slot. Among its segments was "Kangaroo Court", which featured discussion of controversial topics.

Early in its run, Boomerang aired on Thursdays at 2:00 PM, against Thursday Theatre on HSV-7. Towards the end of the series run, it aired at 1:00 PM, aired against Summer Science School on HSV-7 and a test pattern on ABV-2.
