= Astor Records =

Australia record label

Astor Records was an Australian recorded music manufacturer and distributor that operated from the early 1960s to the early 1980s. Astor was the trade name of the consumer electronics manufacturer Radio Corporation Pty. Ltd., a division of Electronic Industries Ltd., which also made Astor radios, radiograms and television sets.

The company expanded into record production in mid-1960, and operated its own vinyl record pressing plant in Melbourne. The company's inaugural release was the single "Speak Low"/"Come Closer to Me" by Philippine-born vocalist Pilita Corrales (credited as Pilita). Three of her albums were released on the Astor label: I'll Take Romance, This Is Pilita and Pilita Tells the Story of Love. She sang mostly English, but also had some Spanish-language hits, and also recorded a Tagalog song, "Dahil sa Iyo".

During its early years as a manufacturer and distributor of vinyl records, much of Astor's success came from holding the rights to press and distribute the output of the UK Pye Records company and its subsidiaries (including Piccadilly). The biggest successes during the 1960s came from material by the Kinks, the Searchers, Petula Clark and Sandie Shaw. The label also enjoyed success with releases of material by Australians including rock group the Masters Apprentices, country singer Betty McQuade and pop singer Bobby Cookson.

At various times, Astor also held the Australian distribution rights to a number of American labels including Motown, Vanguard, Pye, Elektra, MGM/Verve, Kama Sutra, Casablanca, Buddha, Mercury and MCA. During the 1970s, Astor was considered to be one of the 'Big Seven' recorded music distributors in Australia, along with CBS Records, EMI Records, Festival Records, PolyGram, RCA Records and Warner Music Group. In the late 1970s, Astor enjoyed considerable chart and sales success with Kiss and Donna Summer, who were both on the Casablanca label at the time.

Astor was taken over by PolyGram in October 1981, and its manufacturing facility in Melbourne closed on 31 December 1981 and the company ceased to exist.

== See also ==
- Astor Radio Corporation
- The Astor Show
- Astor Showcase
