= Fun With Food =

- Genre: Cooking
- Presented by: Geraldine Dillon
- Country of origin: Australia
- Original language: English

Original release
- Network: Nine Network
- Release: 1960 – 1971

Fun With Food was a television cooking program that screened on the Nine Network in Australia between 1960 and 1971. The compere of the program was cooking expert Geraldine Dillon.

== History ==
Fun With Food was a half hour television cooking show made in Melbourne and screened nationally every week-day on the Nine Network in the 1960s. Each episode featured the host demonstrating how to prepare several different dishes, drawing on various national cuisines and using a variety of cooking methods. It was one of the first television cooking series after television began in Australia in 1956.

The compere was Melbourne-born culinary expert Geraldine Dillon. She had studied at The Emily McPherson College of Domestic Sciences in Melbourne and had completed an advanced course at The Cordon Bleu School in London.

Dillon later hosted another television show for the Nine network. It was called TV Kitchen and was a cooking show that ran for 15 minutes and was screened once a week on the Nine Network from February 1971 till 1976.
