= The Jack Perry Show =

- Genre: Variety
- Presented by: Jack Perry
- Country of origin: Australia
- Original language: English

Production
- Running time: 30 minutes

Original release
- Network: GTV-9
- Release: 1957 – 1957

The Jack Perry Show is an early Australian variety television series. Broadcast on Melbourne station GTV-9, it was one of the first regular series by the station. It was hosted by Jack Perry, aired live and also featured guests. Lasting about a month, the half-hour series aired at 7:30PM, with competition in the time-slot consisting of British series The Adventures of Robin Hood on HSV-7 and American sitcom Life with Elizabeth (with Betty White) on ABV-2. Although his variety series was short-lived, host Jack Perry proved popular with 1950s and 1960s era Melbourne viewers as part of the clown duo Zig and Zag, who had a long running children's show on station HSV-7 originally titled Peters Fun Fair.

Although kinescope recording (an early method of recording live television) had been developed, given the short run and the era it aired in, the series is most likely lost.
