= Keeping Company (TV series) =

- Genre: Lifestyle
- Presented by: Norma Ferris
- Country of origin: Australia
- Original language: English

Production
- Running time: 15 minutes

Original release
- Network: GTV-9
- Release: 27 August 1958 – 14 January 1959

Keeping Company is an Australian television series which aired on Melbourne station GTV-9 weekly on Wednesdays from 27 August 1958 to 14 January 1959. Per TV listings in The Age, the series provided "hints for the hostess", and was hosted by Norma Ferris. Episodes were 15 minutes in duration, aired at 4:00 PM, and were followed, at 4:15 PM, by British series The Buccaneers. Information is not available on the archival status of the series.
