= GTV (Australian TV station) =

Australian television station

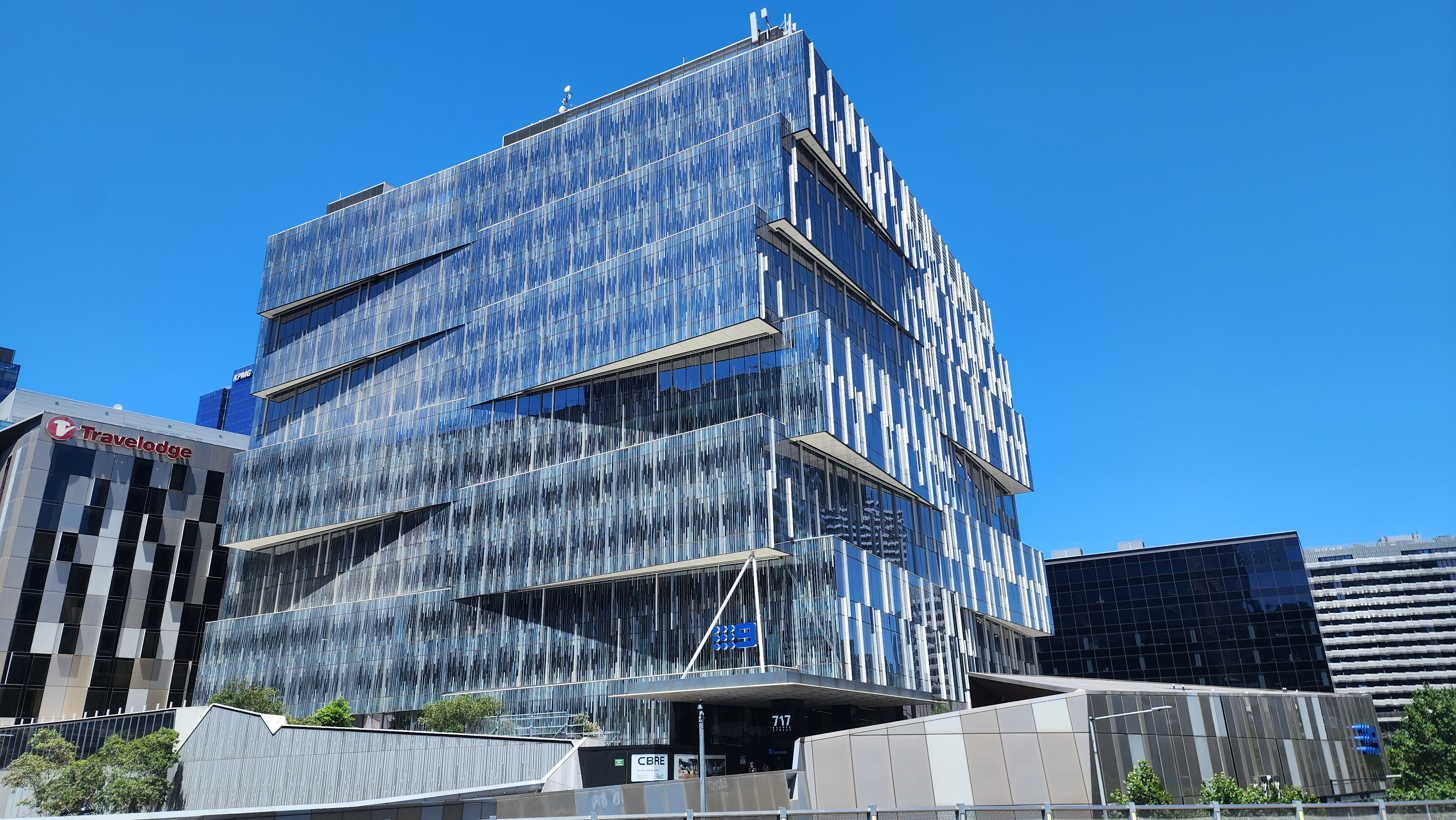
- Melbourne, Victoria; Australia
- Channels: Digital: 8 (VHF); Virtual: 9
- Branding: Nine

Programming
- Language: English
- Affiliations: Nine

Ownership
- Owner: Nine Entertainment; (General Television Corporation Pty Ltd)

History
- First air date: 19 January 1957
- Former channel number: Analog: 9 (VHF) (1956–2013)
- Former affiliations: National Television Network (1956–1963)
- Call sign meaning: General Television Victoria

Technical information
- Licensing authority: Australian Communications and Media Authority
- ERP: 200 kW (analog); 50 kW (digital)
- Transmitter coordinates: 37°49′42″S 145°21′12″E

Links
- Website: www.9now.com.au

GTV is a commercial television station in Melbourne, Australia, owned by the Nine Network. The station is currently based at studios at 717 Bourke Street, Docklands. GTV-9 is the home of the Australian Open tennis coverage.

== History ==
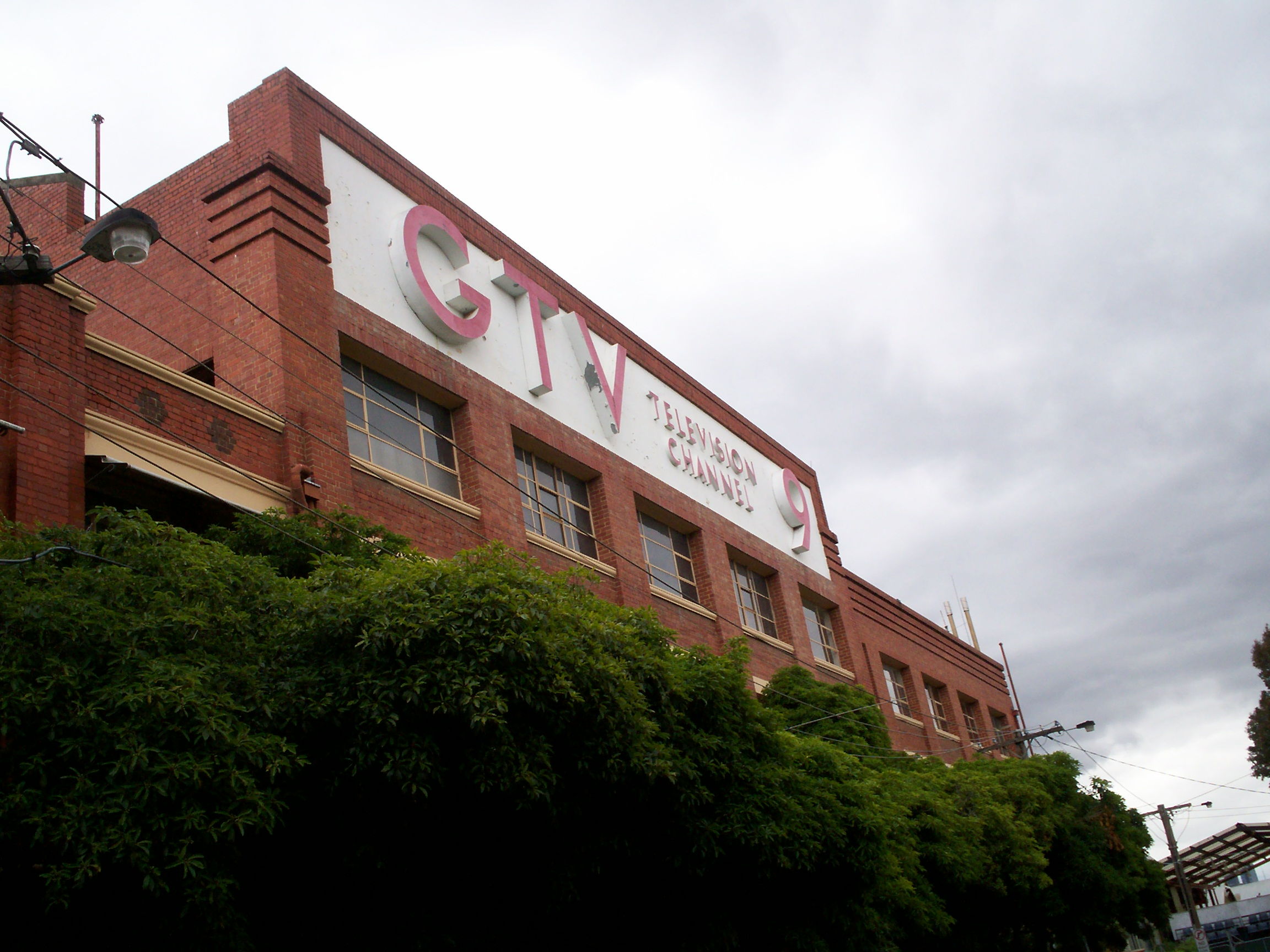
GTV-9 former premises, Television City in Richmond

GTV-9 was amongst the first television stations to begin regular transmission in Australia. Test transmissions began on 27 September 1956, introduced by former 3DB radio announcer Geoff Corke, based at the Mount Dandenong transmitter, as the studios in Richmond were not yet ready. The station covered the 1956 Summer Olympics which Melbourne hosted., the 1956 Carols By Candlelight and the Davis Cup tennis as part of its test transmissions.

The station was officially opened on 19 January 1957 by Victorian Governor Sir Dallas Brooks from the studios in Bendigo Street, Richmond. GTV-9 was the third television station to launch in Victoria after HSV-7 and ABV-2, on 19 January 1957. A clip from the ceremony has featured in a number of GTV-9 retrospectives, in which the Governor advises viewers that if they did not like the programs, they could just turn off.

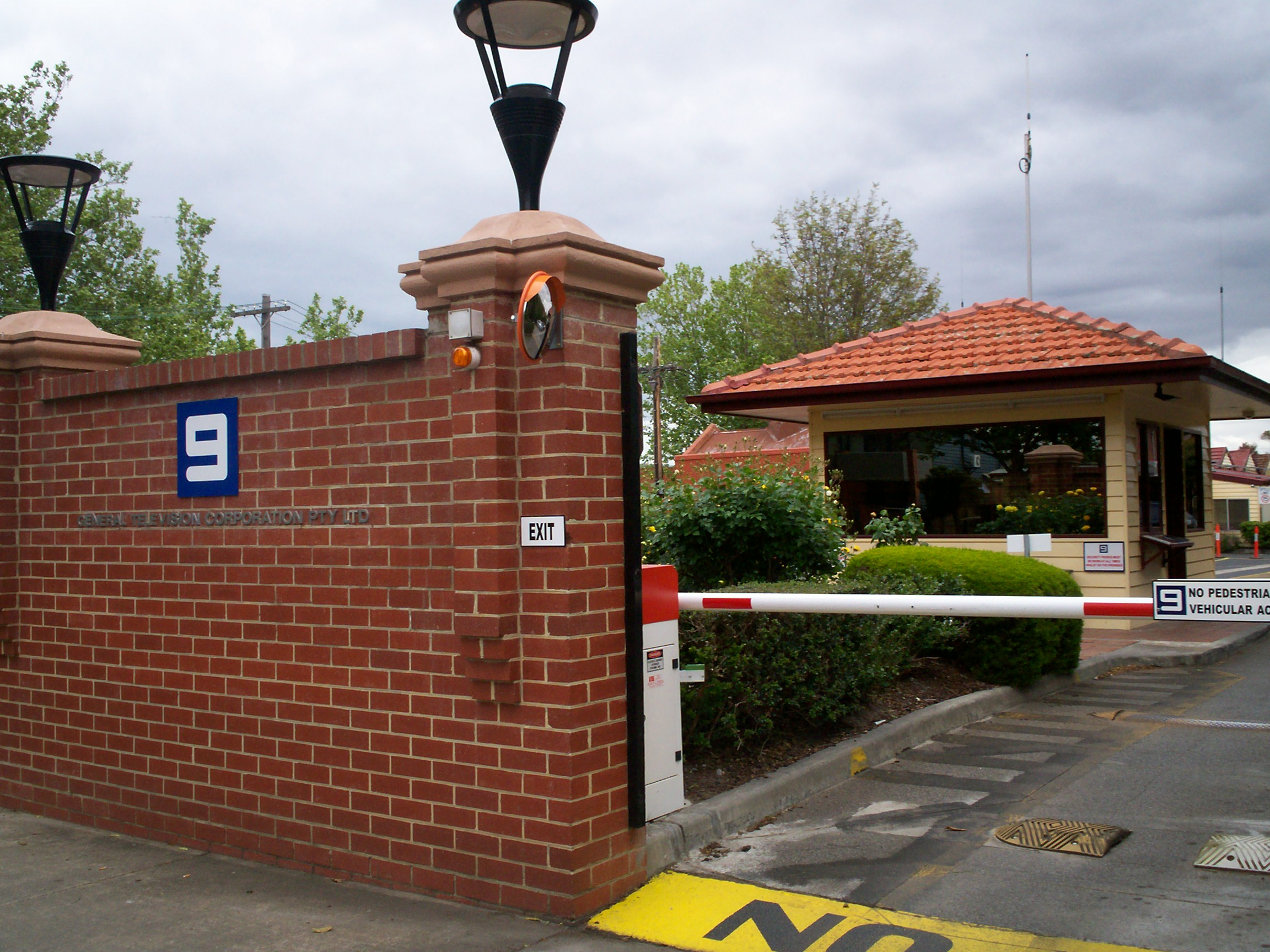
GTV-9 former front gate

The Richmond building, bearing the name Television City, had been converted from a Heinz tinned food factory, also occupied in the past by the Wertheim Piano Company (from 1908 to 1935). A cornerstone, now visible from the staff canteen courtyard, was laid when construction of the Piano factory began.

Eric Pearce was appointed senior newsreader in the late 1960s, after having been the first newsreader at rival station HSV-7. He held that position for almost twenty years. In 1957, GTV-9's first large-scale production was the nightly variety show In Melbourne Tonight ("IMT"), hosted by Graham Kennedy. Kennedy was a radio announcer at 3UZ in Melbourne before being 'discovered' by GTV-9 producer Norm Spencer, when appearing on a GTV-9 telethon. Bert Newton moved from HSV-7 to join Kennedy. IMT continued for thirteen years, dominating Melbourne's television scene for most of that time. It set a precedent for a number of subsequent live variety programmes from the station.

Ownership has changed over the decades. The station was first licensed to the General Television Corporation Ltd., a consortium of two newspapers, The Argus and The Age, together with cinema chains Hoyts, Greater Union, Sir Arthur Warner's Electronic Industries, JC Williamson's Theatres, Cinesound Productions, and radio stations 3XY, 3UZ, 3KZ. In early 1957 The Argus was acquired by The Herald and Weekly Times Ltd, and the paper was closed on the same day that GTV-9 officially opened. The Herald in turn sold its interests in the station to Electronic Industries, later acquired by UK television manufacturer Pye, in 1960. Because of the restriction on foreign ownership of television stations, GTV-9 was then sold to Frank Packer's Australian Consolidated Press, which already owned TCN-9 in Sydney, resulting in the formation of the country's first commercially owned television network. Prior to this GTV-9 was affiliated with ATN-7 in Sydney. Son Clyde Packer ran the network for some time, until a falling out led to a handover to younger son Kerry Packer. In the 1980s the network was sold to Alan Bond, but later bought back at a much lower price. Following the death of Kerry Packer, his son James Packer progressively sold down his stake in the network. (See also Publishing and Broadcasting Limited.)

Along with most Australian TV stations, GTV-9 commenced colour test transmissions in October 1974. The official changeover took place at 12.00am on Saturday 1 March 1975. In 1976, GTV-9 became the first Australian television station to commence permanent 24-hour transmission. In 2001 the station commenced digital television broadcasting, in line with most other metropolitan stations. GTV-9 continued broadcasting in analogue on VHF9, with a digital simulcast on VHF8.

In 2010 it was announced to public and then staff, that after 54 years at Bendigo Street, Richmond, GTV-9 would move day-to-day operations including News and commercial sales to 717 Bourke Street, Docklands. On 25 October 2010, it was announced that GTV-9 would begin producing larger scale studio productions, such as The Footy Show, Hey Hey its Saturday, and Millionaire Hotseat from the new Docklands Studios Melbourne.

On 28 February 2011, GTV-9 broadcast its final live program – the 6pm edition of Nine News – from the Richmond Television City studios, and the following day began broadcasting news bulletins from 717 Bourke Street, Docklands. Also while their new fibre link to their transmission site was being completed, a temporary DVB-S2 link was put up on Optus D1, which ceased at the end of the year.

In 2012, no new programming has been produced out of the new studios. The network opted to move A Current Affair and its host Tracy Grimshaw to TCN-9 in Sydney.

In May 2012, a lower powered permanent backup DVB-S2 link for their transmission site was re-established on Optus D1, which requires at least a two-metre solid receiving dish.

== Digital multiplex ==
LCN	Service Name	Service ID	Timing PID	Video / PID	Audio / PID	Subtitles / PID	EPG / PID
9 and 90	9HD	1073 and 1077	129	H.264 HD (1920×1080i) / 513	Dolby Digital (48 kHz stereo) / 650	EBU Teletext (page 801) / 577	DSM-CC; MHEG-5 / 2306; DVB Events / 18
91	Nine	1072	135	H.262 SD (720x576i) / 519	MPEG-1 Audio Layer II (48 kHz stereo) / 720	EBU Teletext (page 801) / 583	DSM-CC; MHEG-5 / 2306; DVB Events / 18
92 and 95	9Gem HD	1076 and 1078	128	H.264 HD (1920×1080i) / 512	Dolby Digital (48 kHz stereo) / 710	EBU Teletext (page 801) / 576	DSM-CC; MHEG-5 / 2306; DVB Events / 18
93 and 99	9Go! HD	1074 and 1079	133	H.264 HD (1920×1080i) / 517	Dolby Digital (48 kHz stereo) / 770	EBU Teletext (page 801) / 581	DSM-CC; MHEG-5 / 2306; DVB Events / 18
94	9Life HD	1075	136	H.264 HD (1920×1080i) / 520	Dolby Digital (48 kHz stereo) / 730	EBU Teletext (page 801) / 578	DSM-CC; MHEG-5 / 2306; DVB Events / 18
96	9Rush	1080	138	H.264 SD (720x576i) / 522	MPEG-1 Audio Layer II (48 kHz stereo) / 750	EBU Teletext (page 801) / 579	DSM-CC; MHEG-5 / 2306; DVB Events / 18
97	Extra	1081	139	H.262 SD (720x576i) / 523	MPEG-1 Audio Layer II (48 kHz stereo) / 760	none	DSM-CC; MHEG-5 / 2306; DVB Events / 18

== Programming ==
Locally produced programs by or with GTV-9 Melbourne.

=== Current ===
==== 717 Bourke Street ====
- Nine News Melbourne (1957–present)
- Nine Afternoon News Melbourne (2017–present)
- Nine News: First at Five (Weekends, 2014–present)
- TAC Cup Future Stars (2009–present)
- The AFL Sunday Footy Show (1993–present)
- Footy Classified (2007–present)

==== Docklands Studios Melbourne ====
- Tipping Point Australia (2024–present)

==== Other Location ====
- Lego Masters (2019–present)
- The Block (2011–2012, 2014–present)
- Family Food Fight (2017–2018)
- Postcards (1998–present)
- Paramedics (2018–present)
- Bad Mothers (2019–present)
- Carols by Candlelight (1972–present)

==== Sport ====
- Super Netball coverage (2017–present)
- NRL coverage: Melbourne Storm
- Australian Open coverage (2019–present)
- French Open and US Open tennis coverage (2021–present and 2022–present, respectively)

==== Past ====
2010s

- Millionaire Hot Seat (2009–2023) – previously filmed in Studio 9
- Nine News Victoria (March 2017 – June 2021, commissioned for affiliate GLV/BCV in regional Victoria, weeknights only) replaced by WIN News from July 2021.
- Weakest Link (2021)
- Your Domain (2019–2020)
- Australian Ninja Warrior (2019–2020)
- Talkin' 'Bout Your Generation (2009–2012 on Ten, 2018–2019 on Nine)
- The Logies (various years from 1959–present)
- House Husbands (2012–2017)
- Underbelly (2008–2009, 2013)
- A Current Affair (2008–2011) (production moved back to TCN Sydney)
- This Is Your Life (2011) (previous produced at TCN Sydney)
- The Million Dollar Drop (2011)
- Between the Lines (2011)
- Ben Elton Live From Planet Earth (2011)

2000s

- 20 to 1 (2005–2010)
- Who Wants to Be a Millionaire? New Zealand (2008–2010) – The show was tapped at GTV set for New Zealand Viewers.
- Australia's Funniest Home Videos: Daily Edition (2009–2010)
- The Singing Bee (2007–2009)
- Here's Humphrey (2008–2009) (Previously Adelaide)
- Temptation (2005–2009)
- Underbelly series 1 (2008)
- Canal Road (2008)
- Million Dollar Wheel of Fortune (2008)
- Power of 10 (2008)
- Hole in the Wall (2008)
- The Mint (2007–2008)
- 1 vs. 100 (2007)
  (Filmed at the Central City Studios at Melbourne Docklands but managed by GTV-9)
- The Nation (2007)
- Kids’ WB Australia (2006–2019)
- Quizmania (2006–2007)
- Bert's Family Feud (2006–2007)
- Shopping for Love (2005–2007)
- Comedy Inc (in part, 2003–2007)
- Magda's Funny Bits (2006)
- Any Given Sunday (AFL Chat Show) (2005–2006)
- Celebrity Golf Shoot-Out (2005–2006)
- StarStruck (2005)
- Australia's Funniest Home Video Show (2000–2004)
  (production returned to Sydney in 2005)
- Micallef Tonight (2003)
- Test Australia: The National IQ Test (2002–2003)
- AFL (2002–2006)
- Shafted (2002)
- Pass the Buck (2002)
- Surprise, Surprise (2000–2001)
- Russell Gilbert Live (2000)

1990s

- Pig's Breakfast (1999–2000)
- Who Wants to Be a Millionaire? (1999–2007)
- Stingers (1998–2004)
- The Russell Gilbert Show (1998)
- Burgo's Catch Phrase (1997–2001, 2002–2004)
- This is Your Life (1995–2005, 2011)
- Don't Forget Your Toothbrush (LIVE) (1995)
- The Footy Show (AFL) (1994–2019) – previously filmed in Studio 9
- The Price Is Right (1993–1998, 2003–2005)
- The Bob Morrison Show (1994)
- Banjo Paterson's The Man From Snowy River: The McGregor Saga (1993–1996)
- Saturday at Rick’s (1992–1993)
- Chances (1991–1992)
- All Together Now (1991–1993)

1980s

- The Flying Doctors (1986–1993)
- Sale of the Century (1980–2001)

1970s

- The Don Lane Show (1975–1983)
- The Ernie Sigley Show (1974–1976, 1985)
- The Graham Kennedy Show (1972–1975)
- A Current Affair (1971–1978)
- Hey Hey It's Saturday (October 1971 – December 1977, February 1979 – 20 November 1999 (Finale), 2009 (Reunion), April 2010 – November 2010)
- The Sullivans (1976–1983)
- The Daryl and Ossie Cartoon Show (1977)
- Cartoon Corner (1971–1976)
- No Man's Land (1973–1976)

1957–1960s

- The Big Game (1966)
- New Faces (Australian) (1963–1985)
- World Championship Wrestling (1964–1978)
- In Melbourne Tonight (1957–1970, 1996–1998)
- The Tarax Show (1957–1969)
- Boomerang (1961–1962)
- It Could Be You (1961–1969)
- The Adventures of Gerry Gee
- Concentration
- Toddy Time (1961)
- Let Me Read to You (1961)
- Bongo (1960)
- The Bert Newton Show (1959–1960)
- On the Spot (1959–1960)
- Geoff and Judy (1959) with Geoff Corke and Judy Jack
- The Astor Show (1958)
- Face the Nation (1958–1959)
- Keeping Company (1958–1959)
- Personal Album (1958–1959)
- The Peters Club with Rod McLennan, Judy Banks & Joff Ellen
- The Shirley Abicair Show (1958 series of specials, 2 of the 9 episodes were produced by GTV)
- Anything Goes (1957)
- Do You Trust Your Wife? (1957–1958)
- Eric Welch's Sports Album (1957)
- Football Inquest (1957, not to be confused with 1960–1974 HSV-7 series)
- The Happy Go Lucky Show (1957–1959)
- Hillbilly Requests (1957–1958)
- The Jack Perry Show (1957)
- Juke Box Saturday Night (1957–1958)
- Lovely to Look At (1957)
- Mannequin Parade (1957)
- Neptune Presents (1957)
- Open House (1957–1958)
- Thursday at One (1957–1960)
- Raising a Husband (1957)
  - Studio 9 was used as the primary studio.

== News ==
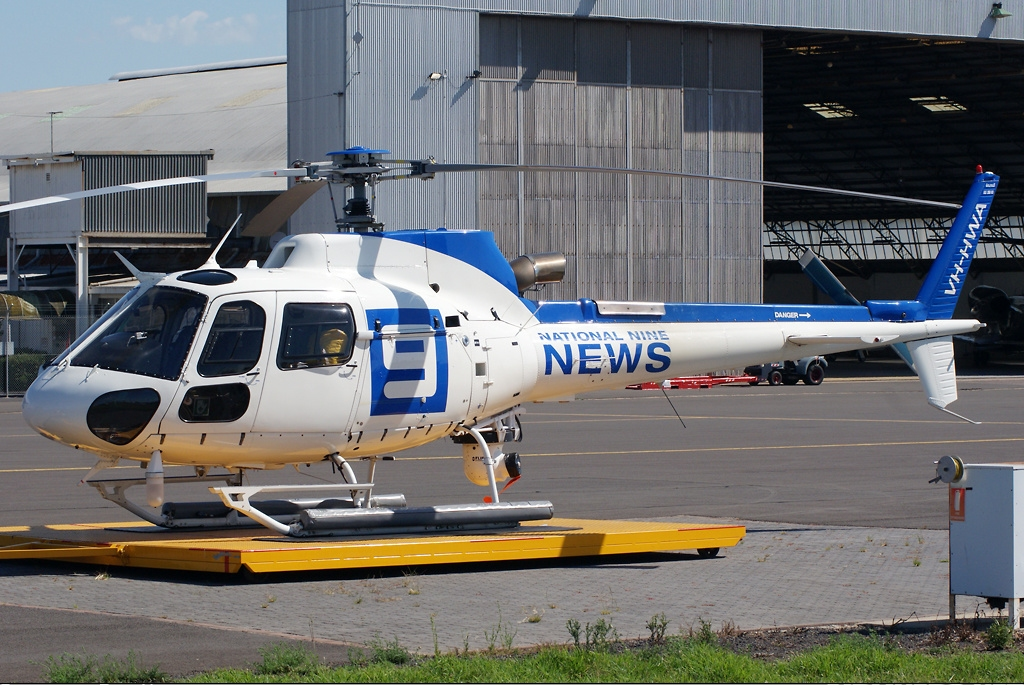
GTV-9 news helicopter

Nine News Melbourne is produced in, and presented from, the GTV-9 studios in Docklands by Alicia Loxley (weeknights) and Peter Hitchener (weekends) with sport presenters Tony Jones (weeknights) and Natalie Yoannidis (weekends) and weather presenters Scherri-Lee Biggs (weeknights) and Madeline Spark (weekends).

The 6PM main bulletin is also simulcast on community radio station Light FM and also streamed online. Nine News nationwide bulletins (Nine Early Morning News and Nine Morning News) are produced in, and presented from, the studios of TCN-9 in Sydney although late night news updates at the weekend are produced at GTV-9 and presented by Peter Hitchener.

In May 2017, the station launched its first local afternoon news bulletin, Nine Afternoon News Melbourne, putting it head-to-head with rival station HSV-7's local afternoon news. The bulletin is presented by Brett McLeod.

Brett McLeod is the main fill-in news presenter for Loxley on weeknights, with Stephanie Anderson being the main fill-in presenter for Hitchener on weekends. Natalie Yoannidis and Trent Kniese are the fill-in sport presenters, and Stephanie Anderson and Isabel Quinlan are the fill-in weather presenters.

== Presenters ==
=== News presenters ===
Weeknights

- Alicia Loxley (2024–present)

Weekends

- Peter Hitchener (2024–present)

Afternoon News
- Brett McLeod (2025–present)

=== Sports presenters ===
Weeknights

- Tony Jones (1990–present)

Weekends

- Natalie Yoannidis (2024–present)

=== Weather presenters ===
Weeknights

- Scherri-Lee Biggs (2026–present)

Weekends

- Madeline Spark (2020–present)

=== Reporters ===
- Christine Ahern (Today Melbourne reporter)
- Jo Hall
- Alexis Daish (A Current Affair reporter)
- Madeline Spark
- Justine Conway
- Eliza Rugg
- Neary Ty
- Izabella Staskowski (Today Melbourne reporter)
- Reid Butler (US correspondent)
- Brett McLeod
- Heidi Murphy (State Political reporter)
- Stephanie Anderson
- Lana Murphy
- Penelope Liersch
- Gillian Lantouris
- Mimi Becker (Europe correspondent)
- Mark Santomartino
- Isabel Quinlan
- Ollie Haig
- Edward Godfrey

=== Sports Reporters ===
- Natalie Yoannidis
- Trent Kniese
- Joel Kennedy
- Owen Leonard

=== Fill-in Presenters ===
- Brett McLeod (News)
- Stephanie Anderson (News & Weather)
- Natalie Yoannidis (Sport)
- Trent Kniese (Sport)
- Owen Leonard (Sport)
- Madeline Spark (Weather)
- Isabel Quinlan (Weather)

=== Former presenters ===
Eric Pearce, who was knighted after his retirement, was GTV-9's chief news presenter from the late 1950s until 1974. After his first retirement, the subsequent American style "NewsCentre Nine" presented by Peter Hitchener did not rate well, so Pearce was persuaded to return in 1976, remaining until 1978.

In 1978, former HSV-7 news presenter Brian Naylor joined as GTV-9's chief weeknight news presenter, with Hitchener on weekends. Naylor's association with Nine lasted 20 years – he retired at the end of 1998, with Naylor replaced by then deputy news presenter Peter Hitchener. Jo Hall took over on weekends, with Tony Jones the main weekend fill-in.

Other main presenters of Nine News Melbourne included Tracy Grimshaw (1981–1993), and Tracey Curro, who also worked on Nine's 60 Minutes, Jo Hall (1998–2011) and Tom Steinfort (2024–2026).

Past weekend sport presenters in recent years have included Leith Mulligan (1999–2006), Heath O'Loughlin (2006–2008), Grant Hackett (2008–2009), Lisa Andrews (2009–2011) and Clint Stanaway (2011–2025). Livinia Nixon was chief weather presenter for 21 years, from 2004 to 2025. She succeeded Rob Gell, who had held the role for 15 years between 1988 and 2004.

== GTV 9 Football Club ==
GTV 9 Football Club

Names
- Full name: GTV 9 Football Club
- Nickname: Gunners

1989 H Section season
- Home-and-away season: 10th

Club details
- Founded: Early 1986
- Dissolved: Late 1989
- Competition: Victorian Amateur Football Association
- Ground: Bill Woodfull Oval

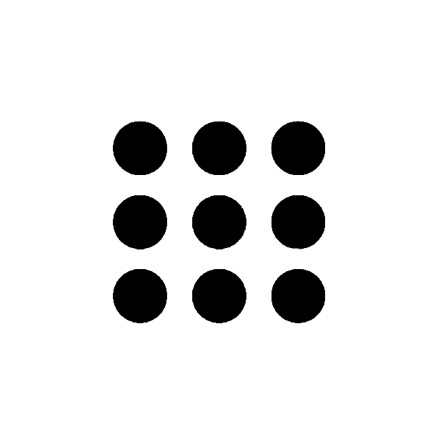
Colours of GTV 9

The GTV 9 Football Club, sometimes stylised as GTV-9 or GTV9 and nicknamed the Gunners, was an Australian rules football club that competed in the Victorian Amateur Football Association (VAFA). The club represented GTV and wore the nine dots that were used in the station's branding.

GTV 9 was formed in 1986 and joined the VAFA the same year, competing in the newly created G Section. The club made finals in its first season, finishing fourth on the ladder before being defeated by Parkside in the first semi-final.

The club struggled in its second season in 1987, winning just three games and finishing 11th on the ladder, resulting in the club's relegation to H Section for the 1988 season.

GTV 9 significantly improved in 1988, winning 14 out of 16 games, however they were defeated in the preliminary final by St Kevin's. GTV 9 player Tony Fox was awarded joint H Section best-and-fairest winner for the 1988 season.

The club won five out of 16 games in its final season in 1989, finishing second last on the H Section ladder. GTV 9 subsequently folded before the 1990 season.

== See also ==
- Television broadcasting in Australia
