= Keynote (disambiguation) =

A keynote in literature, music or public speaking is the principal underlying theme of a larger idea.

Keynote may also refer to:

- Tonic (music), the first note of a major or minor scale, from which the 'key' takes its name
- Keynote (presentation software), presentation creation software designed by Apple, Inc.
- Keynote (notetaking software), Windows note-taking software designed by Tranglos Software
- The Keynote, a 1911 novel by Alphonse de Châteaubriant
- Keynote Records, a record label
- Keynote Flour, a former brand of flour sold in Canada
- Keynote DeviceAnywhere, a subsidiary of Keynote Systems, Inc.
- Keynote Systems, a US-based Internet company
- The Keynotes, 1940s UK vocal quartet before The Johnston Brothers, contracted to Decca
- Bill Maynard and The Keynotes, United Kingdom in the Eurovision Song Contest 1957
- Primo Scala and The Keynotes, Cruising Down the River

== See also ==
- Keynotes (disambiguation)
