= Lyall Brooks =

Australian actor

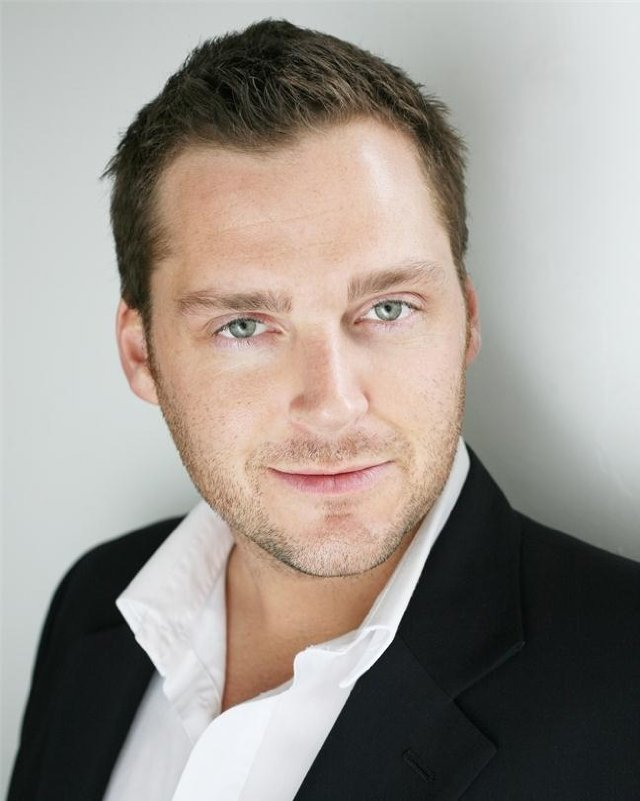
- Lyall Brooks
- Born: 16 November 1978 (age 47); Melbourne, Australia
- Occupation: Actor
- Years active: 2005–present

Lyall Brooks (born 16 November 1978) is an Australian actor who has appeared on TV, film and stage. Establishing a reputation early in his career as an Actor with great comic timing, Brooks has recently received industry praise for more dramatic roles, particularly on stage. He has studied under Emmy Award-winner Chick Vennera at Renegade Players Los Angeles and is also experienced in dance, having studied under one of Australia's most popular choreographers, Tony Bartuccio.

== Television ==
Brooks began his television career in 2005 with a guest role as Glenn Hart on Blue Heelers followed by Ten Network's British/Australian six-part drama series Tripping Over where he played an assistant director opposite Daniel MacPherson. His first major television break was landing a role as a co-host of The Mint in 2007, an Australian phone-in quiz show based on the British program of the same name, and broadcast on the Nine Network. When the show was axed in 2008 Brooks went back to Ten Network to play the role of footy coach Nathan Black in Neighbours, appearing in 11 episodes during 2008 and 2009.

The beginning of 2011 saw Brooks land the role as resident sketch performer on the comedy and variety show Ben Elton Live from Planet Earth which aired on the Nine Network but was cancelled after three shows. He returned to the silver screen in 2012 with guest roles in the ABC 1 comedy series Rake and You're Skitting Me for ABC3. In 2012 Brooks appeared in the 6 part comedy series The Delightfully Shit World of Lachlan and Hayden for Channel 31, where he was also a resident writer.

In February 2013 Brooks landed a guest role in the second series of "Miss Fisher's Murder Mysteries" as Father Blackburn.

== Film ==
In 2007 Brooks appeared in the short film Alex & Alexa for director Rhett Dashwood, which was an official selection in the St Kilda Film Festival. He followed this up with It's Awkward, a short film by Lachdown Productions where he played the lead hero and which became runner up at the 2011 Julia Morris Film Festival. Brooks also appeared as the Brand Manager for the feature film Any Questions for Ben? starring Josh Lawson and Rachael Taylor and he is slated to appear as Ron Furick in Shelly Hatton's US/Australian comedy Dirt Cheap, which is expected to shoot in the second half of 2013.

== Theatre ==
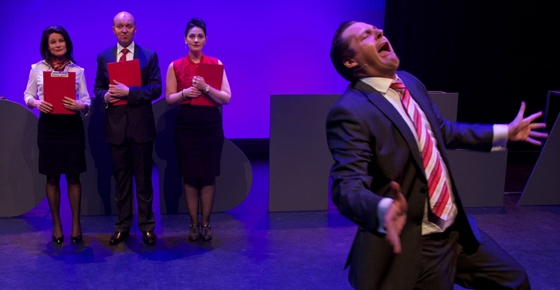
Lyall Brooks Urban Display Suite (2012)

Brooks has enjoyed a varied career on stage with a long list of credits in musical theatre including the role of Jakub in Dutch Courage and as Man for The Thing About Men, both produced by Magnormos, Brandy Bottle Bates in Guys and Dolls, Knuckles in Sugar for The Production Company and as Andy in John and Fiona Thorn's musical cabaret hit Kiss of Death, which debuted at the 2011 Melbourne Fringe Festival.

He has also appeared in two works by Michael Dalley, Vaudeville X in 2009 and Urban Display Suite in 2012 for which he received rave reviews and comparisons to Anthony Newley, Rik Mayall and The Office's David Brent.

More recently Brooks has moved into dramatic theatre, making his mainstage debut with the 2012 Melbourne Theatre Company production of Richard Bean's award-winning play, The Heretic. Playing the character of Geoff Tordoff, he received largely positive reviews for his stage presence and being the standout performer.

In June 2012 it was announced Brooks would play the lead role of Philip in the Australian premiere of Alexi Kaye Campbell's Laurence Olivier Award-winning play The Pride. Directed by Gary Abrahams for Red Stitch Actors Theatre, Brooks received positive reviews ranging from "terrifically brave and nuanced" to displaying "impeccable comic timing and delivery and also a firm grasp of the dramatic". Brooks was rewarded for his efforts with a Green Room Award nomination for Best Ensemble alongside fellow cast members Ben Geurens, Ngaire Dawn Fair and Ben Prendergast.

In March 2013 Brooks teamed up with Red Stitch Actors Theatre again, to play the lead role of Quinn in their production of Penelope by Enda Walsh. His performance in this (otherwise mixed-reviewed) production was described as "the perfect Alpha male. Brooks nails it on every level, and when the play has him resorting to burlesque... he's also very funny. He impresses in everything he does, and Penelope is no exception."

Brooks has reportedly committed to more mainstage roles for 2013 including Patricia Cornelius' new play Savages for fortyfivedownstairs, Sunday in the Park with George for [www.victorianopera.com.au/ Victorian Opera] and as lead Tom in Neil LaBute's Fat Pig for Lab Kelpie.

== Voiceover ==
Lyall Brooks The Pride (2012)

Since 2009 Brooks has worked with Moody Street Productions on several animations series where he has provided lead characters for Sumo Mouse (2010), Flea-Bitten! (2012) and SheZow (2013), which premiered in the US on The Hub network. He voiced characters for the Galaxy Pop series, Get Ace.

== Awards and nominations ==
=== Green Room Awards ===
- 2012: Nominated — Theatre (Companies): Best Ensemble (for The Pride)
- 2008: Nominated — Music Theatre: Male Artist In A Featured Role (as "Man" for The Thing About Men)

== Filmography ==
Television
Year	Series	Role	Notes
2021	Some Happy Day	Quinn	voice
2018	Picnic at Hanging Rock (TV series)	George Green	1 episode
2015-18	Kuu Kuu Harajuku	Eago / Various	156 episodes (voice)
2017	The Leftovers (TV series)	Burly TSA Agent	1 episode
2016	The Mr Peabody & Sherman Show	Billy the Kid	1 episode
2015	The Divorce	Harry	5 episodes
2014-15	Winners & Losers	Jim French	3 episodes
2014	The Time of our Lives	Prosecutor	1 episode
2014	Get Ace	Hugo / Various	52 episodes (voice)
2014	The Doctor Blake Mysteries	Ben Lloyd	1 episode
2012-13	Flea-bitten	Itch / Various	26 episodes (voice)
2012-13	SheZow	Mocktopus / Various	26 episodes (voice)
2013	Miss Fisher's Murder Mysteries	Father Blackburn	
2012	You're Skitting Me	Sketch Performer	
2012	The Delightfully Shit World of Lachlan and Hayden	Resident Sketch Performer	
2012	Rake	Detective Smithy	
2011	Ben Elton Live from Planet Earth	Resident Sketch Performer	
2008-16	Neighbours	Nathan Black / Mike Niven	13 episodes
2008	The Mint	Host	
2006	Tripping Over	Assistant Director	
2005	Blue Heelers	Glenn Hart	

Film
Year	Series	Role	Notes
2020	The Very Excellent Mr. Dundee	Dream Dundee	
2017	Forgone Intrusion	Intruder	Short
2013	Courage	Bevan	Short
2013	Dirt Cheap	Ron Furick	
2012	George	Grandson	Short
2012	Any Questions for Ben?	Brand Manager	
2011	It's Awkward	Hero	Short
2006	Alex and Alexa	Alex	Short
2004	Trial by Fryer	James	Short
