= On the Spot (Australian TV program) =

Australian religious television program

- Genre: Panel discussion
- Presented by: Douglas Tasker
- Country of origin: Australia
- Original language: English

Original release
- Network: GTV-9
- Release: 6 December 1959 – 1960

On the Spot is an Australian television program which aired from 1959 to 1960 on Melbourne station GTV-9. It was a religious panel discussion program moderated by Douglas Tasker. It debuted 6 December 1959 and ran for approximately a year. It was reported in May 1960 as having an audience of 50,000 viewers.
