= List of The Nation episodes =

The following is a list of episodes for the satirical sketch comedy and discussion series The Nation.

== Season 1: 2007 ==
#	Guests	Synopsis	Original airdate
1	Peter Garrett; Stephen Curry; Lisa McCune		5 June 2007
2			12 June 2007
3			19 June 2007
4			26 June 2007
5			3 July 2007
6			11 July 2007
7			18 July 2007
8			25 July 2007
9			1 August 2007
10			8 August 2007
11			15 August 2007
12			22 August 2007
13			29 August 2007

== See also ==
- The Nation
