= Geraldine Dillon =

Australian culinary expert (1936–2020)

Geraldine Anne Dillon (3 January 1936–26 August 2020) was an Australian culinary expert. She presented television cooking shows and spoke about food on radio in Australia in the 1960s and 1970s. She also wrote recipe books and newspaper columns on food preparation.

== Career ==
Geraldine Dillon was born in Melbourne on 3 January 1936 to John Vincent Dillon (1908-1992) and his wife Sheila (née Darcy). John Dillon was a public servant who went on to serve as the Permanent Head of the Chief Secretary's Department (1961–73). He then became Victoria's first Ombudsman (1973–80) and was knighted in 1980.

Geraldine attended the Emily McPherson College of Domestic Economy in Melbourne and in 1959 she travelled to Britain where she completed an advanced course at the Cordon Bleu School in London.

She returned to Australia in 1960 where she assisted one of her instructors from London, Muriel Downes, in presenting a series of six half-hour television cooking programs called Cordon Bleu Kitchen filmed in Sydney. She joined the staff of GTV9 in June 1960 and presented six-minute cooking segments for a weekly program called Thursday at One.

Later in the year she was asked to present a longer half hour cooking show called Fun With Food. It was screened every week-day on the Nine Network from 1960 till 1971. When that show ended she was asked to present a new 15 minute series called TV Kitchen. It was sponsored by The Australian Women's Weekly magazine and was screened nationally on Nine from February 1971 till 1976.

For many years she presented a cooking segment on Melbourne radio station 3AK. She also wrote newspaper columns on food related subjects for The Age and later for The Herald, both in Melbourne. She wrote cooking books and was a judge at cooking contests. Later on she ran two cooking schools and conducted international tours for gourmet food enthusiasts.

Dillon died on 26 August 2020 from Hodgkin lymphoma. She had three brothers, two of whom were Catholic priests.
