= Neptune Presents =

- Genre: Music
- Country of origin: Australia
- Original language: English

Production
- Running time: 5 minutes

Original release
- Network: GTV-9
- Release: 3 May – 18 October 1957

Neptune Presents is an Australian television series which aired from 3 May 1957 to 18 October 1957. It was a 5-minute weekly series, aired at 7:25PM on Fridays on GTV-9, with each episode featuring a vocalist. Like most early Australian series, it aired in a single city only, in this case Melbourne. The source of the title is unknown (it may have been a reference to a sponsor). Though the series is forgotten today, it represents an early attempt at music programming by a Melbourne television station.

On the Fridays the series aired, the schedule also included imported series Sir Lancelot, The Cisco Kid, Meet Mr. McNutley, AEI Theatre (re-titled US anthology episodes), and Alfred Hitchcock Presents, as well as local series The Happy Show, The Pressure Pak Show and In Melbourne Tonight, with the station signing off at 10:50PM after an Epilogue segment.

Among those who appeared on the series included Stan Stafford, and Denis Gibbons.

It is not known if any of the episodes were kinescoped. The survival rate of early Melbourne-produced series is varied, with some shows being completely lost, while some series have at least some surviving material.
