= The Big Game (Australian game show) =

- Presented by: Tony Charlton
- Country of origin: Australia
- Original language: English

Original release
- Network: GTV-9
- Release: 28 April 1966 – 1966

The Big Game is an Australian television game show which aired in 1966 on Melbourne station GTV-9. Tony Charlton was host. The series featured members of VFL teams answering general knowledge questions. Aired at 7:00PM on Thursdays. Aired against Green Acres on HSV-7, news on ABV-2, and Hogan's Heroes on ATV-0.

The National Film and Sound Archive holds two episodes, titled Ampol Big Game after sponsor Ampol. It is not clear if all episodes were similarly sponsored.
