= Toddy Time =

- Genre: Lifestyle
- Presented by: Hal Todd
- Country of origin: Australia
- Original language: English

Production
- Running time: 30 minutes

Original release
- Network: GTV-9
- Release: 1 May 1961

Toddy Time is an Australian television series which aired in Melbourne during 1961, on station GTV-9. The first episode aired 1 May 1961. It was a daytime series made up of various segments, including "camera test", which was a talent segment. The series aired at 11:30AM, and was typically the first show of the day (television in Australia and many other countries was not yet a 24-hour service). It was hosted by Hal Todd.
