= Tiffany Cherry =

Australian sports broadcaster

- Born: 4 August 1971 (age 54); Myrtleford, Victoria, Australia

Tiffany Cherry (born 4 August 1971) is an Australian sports broadcaster, best known as the Australian Football League (AFL's) first female boundary rider on the original Fox Footy. She was the co-host of the Foxtel 2010 Winter Olympic Games in Vancouver as well as a Presenter of the Network's ASTRA Awards winning 2010 Commonwealth Games in Delhi and Logie Award winning 2012 Olympic Games in London. Cherry also co-hosted a daily Olympic Drivetime show for the UK's national pop and rock radio station, Absolute Radio, live from Hyde Park throughout the duration of the Games with English broadcaster, journalist and television and radio personality, Johnny Vaughan. Cherry hosted the prime time week night sport on Sky News Australia alongside news presenter, Michael Willesee, Jr. between 2010 and 2012 before leaving the network to host and produce her own sports radio program, The Hen House on Melbourne's SEN 1116.

Cherry landed her first television role as a reporter with Seven Network Talking Footy program, before spending two years at Prime News in Albury as the station's sport's presenter. Following a one-month scholarship with US broadcaster CNN, based at the network's US headquarters in Atlanta, Georgia, Cherry moved to Sydney after landing a co-hosting role alongside Matthew White on Network Ten One Summer Sports Show. In 1999 she re-joined the Seven Network in Melbourne as a reporter, becoming only the second female to ever work in the Sports Department and co-hosted the Sydney 2000 Olympic Welcome Home Parade in Melbourne with then chief news reader, David Johnston. Following the demise of the original Fox Footy in 2006, she set up the Melbourne bureau for the world's largest sports network, ESPN before moving to the United States to work as an anchor, reporter and producer on the Australian and New Zealand version of SportsCenter where she hosted the ESPY Awards and also joined the network's exclusive Tennis Team, hosting the Australian Open from Melbourne Park in 2008 live back into the US market. Cherry was also a regular guest on Channel Nine's The Nation hosted by comedian, Mick Molloy.

Cherry attended Carey Baptist Grammar School in Melbourne before completing her Bachelor of Applied Science of Physiotherapy at La Trobe University Lincoln School of Health Science. She is also a trained sports masseur and upon completion of her degree, landed a scholarship with Olympic Park Sports Medicine Centre, where she also joined Richmond Football Club between 1995 and 1997 as a physiotherapist. She was an accomplished national hurdler and represented Australia at the 1999 World Triathlon Championships in Montreal, Canada. Cherry was also a training partner of Cathy Freeman. At the 1994 Commonwealth Games, Cherry handed Freeman the Australian and Australian Aboriginal flags after she won the 400m gold medal.
