= Keynotes (Australian game show) =

- Genre: Game show
- Presented by: Alistair McHarg (1964); Richard Wilkins (1992–93)
- Narrated by: Craig Huggins (1992–93)
- Theme music composer: Rick Turk (1992–93)
- Country of origin: Australia
- Original language: English
- No. of seasons: 2

Production
- Running time: 30 minutes
- Production company: Grundy Television (1992–93)

Original release
- Network: Nine Network
- Release: 2 March – 5 June 1964
- Release: 30 November 1992 – 26 February 1993

Related
- Keynotes (UK version)

Keynotes is an Australian game show that aired on the Nine Network. It originally ran from 2 March to 5 June 1964 with Alistair McHarg as host. It was revived from 30 November 1992 to 26 February 1993 with Richard Wilkins as host and Melbourne radio host Craig Huggins as announcer and voice over.

== Format ==
According to the host, the aim of the game was for "two teams of players (one colored pink and are the champions, the other colored blue and are the challengers), to try to put the right words in the right songs and see how well they can follow the bouncing ball to solve our puzzle song."

=== First three rounds ===
A series of nine squares are presented - with each square hiding a note in a "familiar" tune. The host gives the contestants notes 1, 5, and 9 in all 3 rounds; note 7 was usually added as well in round 3.

A member of each team (which consists of three players each) joins the host at the central podium, where they have three coloured buttons (red, blue & yellow) each. A card is randomly selected from the host, which represents the note which is set to be revealed. Three words attached to that number are provided which could represent the next word in a given tune. The contestant who is the quickest to select the correct word after hearing the start of this tune is given the note represented by that selected card. If neither contestant is able to select the correct word, the note goes in as a blank and two new players are brought up to play for two keynotes (and so on).

The team that the winning representative came from then has the opportunity to guess the main tune by listening to the already-revealed notes and following the rhythm of the bouncing ball. If the team can correctly name that tune, they win the round and receive a cash prize which doubles for each round. If not, the round continues, rotating through the various members of both teams. If neither of the teams can work out the song before all nine notes are revealed - then the prize for that round is lost and the players go on to the next round.

The cash values for correctly identifying the song in the first three rounds are $300 in round 1, $600 in round 2, and $1,200 in round 3, with a maximum possible total of $2,100. The team with the most money at the end of the game wins the game, keeps their cash, and goes on to play for prizes worth double their main game cash winnings.

=== Bonus round ===
The winning team attempts to win double their cash winnings in prizes from the first three rounds. The team must attempt to uncover the nine notes of the final tune over the course of 30 seconds, by using a buzzer to stop a random flashing light in order to choose a note, and then picking the correct next word, as in the first three rounds. However, the final tune is only played once, at the end of the 30 seconds. If any of the questions representing the notes are not answered correctly within the time limit, they will not be revealed in the playing of the final tune. If the team can correctly identify the final tune, they win double the money in prizes.

Champions can stay on the program for up to five shows, and if they succeed in surviving those five shows, they also win a holiday. The maximum possible winnings in total is therefore $4,200 per show, and a team retires after 5 shows with a maximum amount of $21,000 plus the holiday.

== See also ==
- Binnie Time - A musical quiz which aired 1958-1959 on the Nine station in Melbourne.
