= Lovely to Look At (TV series) =

- Directed by: Rod Kinnear
- Presented by: Maxwell Gibb
- Country of origin: Australia
- Original language: English

Production
- Running time: 15 minutes

Original release
- Network: GTV-9
- Release: March 1957 – November 1957

Lovely to Look At is an Australian fashion show television series broadcast on Melbourne station GTV-9 from March 1957 to November 1957. Episodes were 15-minutes in duration, broadcast live, originally aired at 10:15PM on Sundays though towards the end of the run the episodes were broadcast at 10:30PM. Each episode typically was preceded on the schedule by a newscast and followed by Epilogue and station sign-off. It is notable as representing an early effort by GTV-9 at locally produced content. It was compered by Maxwell Gibb.

The series was directed by Rod Kinnear, who had previously been a press photographer.

The Age provides additional information on the series, listing Ian Holmes as technical director, and George Havrillay as set designer, and noting that each episode went through three rehearsals before broadcast. It also listed Arlene Andrewartha, Elaine Grayden, Rae Crawley as among the models used by the series.

It is not known if any of the episodes were kinescoped, and it is possible (though not confirmed) that the series is lost.
