= Keynotes (Canadian TV program) =

- Genre: Music
- Starring: Dorothy Harpell; Buddy Victor; Tommy Banks; Harry Boon
- Country of origin: Canada
- Original language: English
- No. of seasons: 1

Production
- Production locations: Edmonton, Alberta

Original release
- Network: CBC Television
- Release: 5 April – 27 September 1964

Keynotes is a Canadian music variety television program that aired on CBC Television in 1964.

== Premise ==
Tommy Banks (piano) and Harry Boon (hammond organ) backed up either Buddy Victor or Dorothy Harpell in this program. Dorothy Harpell starred in her own half-hour variety show on CBC TV, other shows such as Keynotes, First Nighter and Some of those Days out of Vancouver BC, also appeared on the Art Linkletter Show on CBS TV Los Angeles and then made a career entertaining in every major Hotel, Casino and Supper Club in southern California and Omaha, retiring when she was 62, currently living in Moncton N.B. with family. Dorothy Harpell died 23 November 2017.

== Scheduling ==
This 15-minute program began as a single episode on 5 January 1964, then weekly on Sundays at 3:00 p.m. from 5 April to 28 June 1964, then Saturdays 6:30 p.m. from 4 July to its concluding broadcast on 27 September 1964.
