= Keynotes (British game show) =

British television game show (1989–1992)

- Genre: Game show
- Presented by: Alistair Divall
- Announcer: David Hopewell
- Composers: Bill Sharpe (theme); Keith Chegwin (tunes)
- Country of origin: United Kingdom
- Original language: English
- No. of series: 5
- No. of episodes: 205

Production
- Running time: 30 minutes (inc. adverts)
- Production company: Reg Grundy Productions in association with HTV West

Original release
- Network: ITV
- Release: 13 March 1989 – 18 December 1992

Related
- Keynotes

Keynotes is a British game show that aired on ITV from 13 March 1989 to 18 December 1992 and hosted by Alistair Divall. The aim of the game was for "two teams of players, to try to put the right words in the right songs and see how well they can follow the bouncing ball to solve our puzzle song."

== Main game ==
Each show has two teams of three players (usually two women and a man), on the left side are the champions (green) and on the right side is the challengers (yellow). To start the game – there are three general rounds, which each follow the same format:

A series of nine squares are presented – with each square hiding a note in a "familiar" tune. The host gives the contestants notes 1, 5, and 9 in all 3 rounds with note 7 being added as an extra free note in round 3 from series 2 onwards.

A member of each team joins the host at the central podium, where they'll have three coloured buttons each. A card is randomly selected from the host, which represents the note which is set to be revealed. Three words are provided which could represent the next word in a given tune. The contestant which is quickest to select the correct word after hearing the start of this tune is given the note represented by that selected card. If the first contestant picked the wrong word and his/her opponent choose the right one then his/her opponent gets that note. If neither contestant is able to select the correct word, the note goes in as a blank and two new players are brought up to play for two keynotes (and so on).

The team that the winning representative came from then has the opportunity to guess the main tune by listening to the already-revealed notes and following the rhythm of the bouncing ball. If the team can correctly name that tune, they'll win the round and receive a cash prize, which is doubled up in each round. The first round was worth £50, doubling up to £200, a maximum of £350 to be won. From series 2 onwards, the money reduced to £30, doubling up to £120, for a maximum of £210. If not, the round continues, rotating through the various members of both teams. If neither of the teams can work out the song before all nine notes are revealed – then the prize for that round is lost and the players go on to the next round. Both teams kept their earnings and the team that won the most money played the final round to double those winnings. If a team won five games in a row, they earned a £500 bonus and would immediately retire from the show.

== Bonus round ==
The winning team attempts to double their cash winnings from today's edition. The team must attempt to uncover the nine notes of the final tune over the course of 30 seconds, by using a buzzer to stop a random flashing light in order to choose a note, and then picking the correct next word, as in the main rounds. However, the final tune is only played once at the end of the 30 seconds. If any of the questions representing the notes are not answered correctly within the time limit, they will not be revealed in the playing of the final tune. If the team can correctly identify the final tune, their money will be doubled. The maximum a team can win on Keynotes was £4,000 (£2,600 from series 2 onwards).

== Transmissions ==
Series	Start date	End date	Episodes
1	13 March 1989	12 May 1989	45
2	23 October 1989	8 December 1989	35
3	29 October 1990	21 December 1990	40
4	6 January 1992	21 February 1992	35
5	12 October 1992	18 December 1992	50
