= Face the Nation (Australian TV program) =

- Genre: Panel discussion
- Presented by: Roland Strong
- Country of origin: Australia
- Original language: English

Original release
- Network: GTV-9
- Release: 20 July 1958 – 10 May 1959

Face the Nation is an Australian panel discussion television program which aired on Melbourne station GTV-9 from 20 July 1958 to 10 May 1959. Political matters were often discussed. The chairman of the panel was Roland Strong.

TV listings list it as being a live programme.

== Guests ==
- Sir Robert Menzies, Prime Minister
- Sir Arthur Warner, Minister for Transport
- Sir Macfarlane Burnet, virologist
- Dr Kenneth Adamson, Federal President of the Australian Dental Association
- Selwyn Porter, Chief Commissioner of Victoria Police
