= Thursday at One =

- Genre: Lifestyle
- Presented by: Eric Pearce; Bert Newton; Barry McQueen; Jessie Matthews; Laurel Young; Geraldine Dillon; Lesley Webster; Evie Hayes; Judy Ann Ford; Binny Lum
- Country of origin: Australia
- Original language: English

Original release
- Network: GTV-9
- Release: 1957 – 1960

Thursday at One was an Australian daytime television series which aired from 1957 to 1960 on Melbourne station GTV-9. A "programme for the housewife", the running time was as long as two hours.

The series was made up of various segments, which varied during the run of the series, and which at various times included Question Time, Family Doctor, Keep in Trim, Making and Mending, Film Contest, Accent on Beauty, Forty and Over Talent Quest, Personality of the Week, Getting Together, Fun with Food, Bill Warnecke's Quartet, Shirley Broadway, Ace of Clubs Orchestra.

Each episode included either two or three hosts. The hosts of the series varied during the run, but included Eric Pearce, Bert Newton, Barry McQueen, Jessie Matthews, Laurel Young, Geraldine Dillon, Lesley Webster, Evie Hayes, Judy Ann Ford and Binny Lum.

In the 1 August 1957 episode, a woman named Mrs. Yamomoto appeared to demonstrate Japanese flower arranging. This may have been one of the first instances of an Asian making a guest appearance on an Australian television program.

As live Australian daytime television series were rarely recorded during the run of the series, it is unlikely (though not impossible) that any complete episodes still exist. Women's World, an ABC series which aired during the same era and which was also aimed at the housewives, does however have several existing episodes and episode segments at the National Archives of Australia and National Film and Sound Archive, though these are not available for viewing.
