= Shopping for Love =

Australian reality television series

Shopping for Love is an Australian reality show television program. Airing on the Nine Network, it is hosted by Pete Lazer and Andi Lew and premiered on 4 December 2005.
