= The Nation (TV series) =

- Starring: Mick Molloy (host); Paul Calleja; Tiffany Cherry; Gary Eck; Jackie O Nikki Osborne; Akmal Saleh; Pete Smith
- Country of origin: Australia
- No. of episodes: 13 (List of episodes)

Production
- Running time: 60 minutes per episode including commercials

Original release
- Network: Nine Network
- Release: 5 June – 29 August 2007

Related
- The Mick Molloy Show (1999)

The Nation was an Australian satirical sketch comedy and discussion series covering the week's events across political and social spectrums, premiering on Tuesday 5 June 2007 at 9:30 pm on the Nine Network.

It was hosted by Mick Molloy with a supportive cast of Akmal Saleh, Jackie O, Tiffany Cherry, Gary Eck, Paul Calleja, Nikki Osborne and Pete Smith as the announcer for the show. The show was taped at the GTV-9 Melbourne studios in front of a studio audience. The first guests on the show were Peter Garrett, Stephen Curry and Lisa McCune. The final episode was broadcast on Wednesday 29 August 2007.

== Ratings ==
The Nation's initial episode was the Nine Network's top rating program within the 16- to 39-year-old demographic in Melbourne, Sydney and the east coast. However, the program was third nationally, beaten by Channel Seven's Crossing Jordan (974,000) and Channel Ten's Numb3rs (910,000). After the first episode, ratings began to decline with the ratings for the second episode dropping just over one fifth of the audience.

Over the course of the series, changes to the format were made. Veteran announcer Pete Smith and WSFM 101.7 compere Amanda Keller were additions to the cast. On 4 July 2007, the Nine Network confirmed that The Nation would move from its primetime Tuesday timeslot to a new time of 10:30pm on Wednesday nights, in direct competition with Ten Late News and Channel Seven's The Unit.

The ratings for episodes were as follows:

- Episode 1: 772,000
- Episode 2: 610,000
- Episode 3: 626,000
- Episode 4: 575,000
- Episode 5: 548,000,
- Episode 6: 418,000
- Episode 7: 363,000.
- Episode 8: 398,000
- Episode 9: 387,000
- Episode 10: 406,000.
- Episode 11: 413,000.

== Criticism ==
The Herald Sun reported that The Nation had received a mixed reaction on the initial episode, with dozens of viewers complaining to the Nine Network about bad-taste jokes made on-air.
