= Katrina Conder =

Australian television presenter

Katrina Conder is an Australian television presenter. She was a host on Channel Nine's late night game show Quizmania. She made her Quizmania debut on 6 January 2007. Katrina has also appeared on 3 episodes of Blue Heelers as a nurse. Katrina starred in a lead role in the 2005/06 9minds production of Black Rock

Conder has also appeared on Channel Nine's 1 vs 100.

She is a graduate of the National Theatre Drama School in Melbourne. Katrina Conder trained as a dancer at the Hart School of Dance in Melbourne. Her training included: Tap, Jazz, Ballet, Song & Dance.

Katrina presented on Channel 9's replacement of Quizmania, The Mint, until it was axed on 29 March 2008.
