= Nikki Osborne =

Australian actress

- Born: July 19, 1981 (age 45); Redcliffe, Queensland, Australia
- Occupations: Actress, television presenter, Comedian
- Years active: 2003-present
- Spouse: Jeremy Starr (m. 2007)
- Children: 2

Nikki Osborne is an Australian actress and television presenter. She is best known as a former host of the now-defunct late night interactive quiz series, Quizmania (Nine Network, 2006–07). Osborne featured the American mini-series The Mystery of Natalie Wood (2003) and the 2004 film Ned. In 2020 she appeared in the sixth season of the Australian version of I'm a Celebrity...Get Me Out of Here!.

== Career ==
=== Television and film ===
One of three originals, Osborne was a host on the Australian phone-in quiz show Quizmania, broadcast on the Nine Network in the late-night time slot, post-midnight. Osborne left the show in May 2007 to work on the new Mick Molloy comedy series, The Nation.

In 2003, Osborne played Tiffany in the Australian film Ned.

In 2004, Osborne featured in American mini-series The Mystery of Natalie Wood, playing the part of Jackie Estes, Natalie Wood's best friend. In 2004, she performed in the Australian television mini-series Jessica as the Thomas daughter, Gwendolyn.

Osborne was a cast member in the Nine Network sketch and current affairs comedy show The Nation, hosted by Mick Molloy. She was absent from episodes 10-12 of the run but returned for the final episode in August 2007.

In July 2014, Osborne was one of the ensemble cast in the Channel 7 sketch comedy show Kinne, in a variety of roles revealing her genuine talent for madcap, Aussie humour.

In 2020, Osborne joined the sixth season of the Australian version of I'm a Celebrity...Get Me Out of Here!. She was eliminated on 19 January 2020 and finished in 13th place.

Osborne has also featured in television advertisements, including for Budget Direct.

=== Radio ===
In January 2025, Osborne joined Nova 106.9 to host Ash, Luttsy & Nikki Osborne. She resigned from the show in December 2025.

=== Video podcast ===
In May 2026, Osbourne began hosting Nova's first video podcast Bush Deep, playing the character "Bushie". She interviewed Australian Prime Minister Anthony Albanese for an episode released in July 2026. During the episode, she asked him to play a game of "date, marry, shag", in which he said he would "all of the above" to Kylie Minogue. He subsequently apologised, after complaints from some parliamentarians.

=== Music ===
In 2004, Osborne toured with performer Jon English as a lead singer.

== Personal life ==
Osborne married long term boyfriend, Jeremy Starr, on 6 October 2007. The couple have two children.
