= Be Interactive =

- Type: Privately owned company
- Headquarters: Melbourne, Australia
- Parent: Be Interactive Australia
- Website: Official website

Be Interactive is an Australian outsourced sales and marketing company that provides services such as customer acquisition.

It was founded in Brisbane in 2014. After assembling a team with a multitude of backgrounds including Finance, Sales, Construction, Hospitality, and Retail, the team began a start-up project in Brisbane.

The company was named and founded upon the values it stands for - in essence they wanted people to 'Be' whoever they want to Be.

At present, the company focuses on developing their sales force for clients in the Non-for-Profit, Health Foods and Energy sectors.
