= The Astor Show =

- Genre: Music television
- Presented by: John McMahon
- Country of origin: Australia
- Original language: English

Production
- Running time: 60 minutes

Original release
- Release: 1958 – 31 August 1958

The Astor Show is an Australian television series which aired in 1958 on Melbourne station GTV-9. In the series, the cast danced to and mimed hit recordings (a mix of contemporary and older hits). The series ended with the 31 August 1958 broadcast. The timeslot of the series was then occupied for several weeks by a series of specials starring Shirley Abicair, and later by an American drama series.

== Synopsis ==
The format of the series was very similar to Hit Parade, which debuted earlier and aired on rival station HSV-7. Series consisting of the cast lip-syncing other artists songs were not uncommon on the early Australian television, but eventually vanished, likely rendered obsolete by the likes of Six O'Clock Rock and The Bobby Limb Show in the late-1950s.

== Sponsorship ==
As the title suggests, the series was sponsored by Astor Radio Corporation.

== Production ==
There is no information available as to whether any kinescope recordings (also known as telerecordings) exist of the series (kinescope recording/telerecording being the method used to record live television in Australia prior to the introduction of video-tape). However, it is confirmed that kinescopes exist of rival series Hit Parade.

== See also ==
- Astor Radio Corporation
- Astor Records
- Astor Showcase
