= 2007 in Australian television =

The year 2007 in Australian television was the 52nd year of continuous operation.

== Events ==
- 15 January – Channel Nine, NBN Television & WIN Television relaunch their on-air presentation.
- 22 January – Monique Wright was then crowned Sunrise's new weather presenter. A year later Monique Wright left Sunrise and the prize went to Fifi Box. On that day, SBS's World News is revamped with a 1-hour format.
- 29 January – Former Who Wants to Be a Millionaire? host and CEO of the Nine Network, Eddie McGuire, returns to screens as the host of Nine's new game show 1 vs. 100. Also debuting on the same night, but at a different time, is the Seven Network's big money game show The Rich List hosted by Andrew O'Keefe. National Nine News nearly relaunch their news graphics, but on that day, this never happened.
- 9 February – The Australian Football League signs a five-year broadcasting contract with the Seven Network, Network Ten and pay TV provider Foxtel, in a controversial deal that will see half of the AFL matches played each week broadcast on Foxtel instead of free-to-air television.
- 12 February – Jodi Power, a family friend of convicted drug smuggler Schapelle Corby, made allegations in a paid interview on Channel Seven's Today Tonight that Corby's sister Mercedes had previously asked Power to transport drugs to Bali and that Mercedes had confessed to smuggling compressed cannabis concealed inside her body into Indonesia. Mercedes is interviewed by Tracy Grimshaw on Channel Nine's major rival program A Current Affair on 14 February.
- 30 March – The Seven Network broadcasts its first AFL premiership match since the 2001 AFL Grand Final, for another long-indefinite run.
- 1 April – The Seven Network signs a $3 million a year for the broadcast rights to the fourth series of Kath & Kim, a popular sitcom which had previously aired until their final appearance on the ABC in 2005 as Da Kath & Kim Code.
- 7 April – Australian music program Rage celebrates 20 years on air is over 4 weeks in 20 Years Of Rage.
- 9–13 April – The fourth season of The Mole is replayed during the afternoon period, during the NSW school holidays.
- 16 April – Australia's Leader of the Opposition Kevin Rudd and Federal Minister for Employment and Workplace Relations Joe Hockey discontinue their weekly appearances on Seven's breakfast news program Sunrise after four years. The decision follows possibly politically damaging accusations that Sunrise had requested that Rudd appear at a dawn service for ANZAC Day in Long Tan, Vietnam, with the service held an hour early to accommodate the time difference for live television.
- 28 April – 12-year-old singer Bonnie Anderson s the first season of Australia's Got Talent
- 1 May – Singer Kate Ceberano and her partner John-Paul Collins the sixth season of Dancing with the Stars.
- 18 May – After a tumultuous 15-month reign, the CEO of the Nine Network, Eddie McGuire, resigns.
- 18 June – Seven Network's The Morning Show is introduced, marking a new millennium in daytime television.
- 2 July – National Nine News nearly tipped to relaunch their news graphics, this also never happened as it lost it to Seven News.
- 11 July – American educational animated series WordGirl debuts on ABC. The series wouldn't debut in its home country of the USA until 3 September of the same year.
- 23 July – Long running soap opera Neighbours has a major cast revamp to try to improve its struggling ratings, and continue its long-run on the Network Ten.
- 29 July – Seven Network claims 20th record-breaking ratings win of the year to secure ratings year.
- 19 August – Fourth series premiere of Kath & Kim at 7 – 30pm, now on the Seven Network, attracts an audience of 2.521 million nationally, making it the most watched television programme so far in 2007 and the highest rating ever for a first episode in the history of Australian television.
- 26 August – Veteran journalist, TV legend and former A Current Affair host Ray Martin announces he is leaving the Nine Network after thirty years, citing disillusionment with the network's management.
- 6 September – Julian Morrow and Chas Licciardello from The Chaser's War on Everything along with nine other production crew members are arrested in Sydney during the APEC summit for entering a restricted area. Those arrested were travelling in a fake Canadian motorcade and Licciardello was dressed up as Osama bin Laden.
- 9 September – Seven Network journalist Ben Davis is attacked outside Melbourne's Olympic Park Stadium by a gang of drunken Brisbane Broncos supporters during a live cross to Seven's Brisbane bulletin.
- 1 October – Seven News Perth journalist Chris Mainwaring dies from a drug overdose. Just the day before, Mainwaring was preparing for a boxing duel with cricketer Justin Langer, parts of which appear on the Seven News bulletin on the day of his death.
- 15 October – Seven HD launches.
- 21 October – The Nine Network includes the "worm" audience reaction graph in their broadcast of the election debate between John Howard and Kevin Rudd, despite agreements to the contrary. The National Press Club cut Nine's transmission feed, and the ABC cut their backup feed. Nine continued to transmit by adding the worm to the Sky News broadcast.
- 22 October – After 18 months off the air, Who Wants to Be a Millionaire? makes a brief return to Australian television; lasting just five weeks of more poor ratings.
- 29 October – Seven HD and Prime Television service a new regional multi-channel, Prime HD.
- 2 November – Perth-based Network Ten's news anchorperson Charmaine Dragun is found dead near Sydney, apparently due to a suicide.
- 25 November – Natalie Gauci becomes the last woman to win the fifth series of Australian Idol, then months later her singing career tanked.
- 27 November – McLeod's Daughters actress Bridie Carter and her partner Craig Monley win the seventh season of Dancing with the Stars.
- 30 November – Daryl Somers announces he is quitting the hosting job of the Seven Network's high-rating reality show Dancing with the Stars.
- 3 December –
  - Seven's Melbourne news bulletin defeats its Nine and Ten counterparts in the ratings for the first time in nearly 30 years. Seven won 20 weeks, Nine won 19 and the other week was tied.
  - American science fiction sitcom The Big Bang Theory created by Chuck Lorre, the creator of Two and a Half Men premieres on the Nine Network at 7:30 pm.
- 16 December – Ten HD launches.
- December – The Seven Network wins the ratings year for the first time since 1978 (excluding 2000, the year of the Sydney Olympics), thanks to their "Seven in '07" campaign which aired at the start of the year.
- December – Network Ten broadcasts Sony Pictures movies for the final-ever time, before handing the television rights to the Nine Network. Ten later revived the Sony Pictures output deal 6 years later.
- The 2004 romance film The Notebook starring Ryan Gosling and Rachel McAdams premieres on the Nine Network.

== Ratings – network shares ==
| Market | Network shares |
|---|---|---|---|---|---|
| Market | ABC | Seven | Nine | Ten | SBS |
| 5 cities | 16.7% | 29.1% | 26.9% | 21.9% | 5.5% |
| Sydney | 17.5% | 28.8% | 27.7% | 19.9% | 6.0% |
| Melbourne | 16.4% | 28.6% | 27.1% | 22.4% | 5.5% |
| Brisbane | 16.5% | 28.6% | 28.1% | 21.4% | 5.4% |
| Adelaide | 15.5% | 28.9% | 26.3% | 24.3% | 4.9% |
| Perth | 16.7% | 31.5% | 23.5% | 23.3% | 5.0% |

== New channels ==
- 13 July – National Indigenous Television
- 15 October – Seven HD
- 29 October – Prime HD (serviced by Seven HD)
- 1 December – Showcase
- 16 December – Ten HD

== Debuts ==
| | ABC TV debuts |
| Date | Program |
| 12 February | Difference of Opinion |
| 21 April | The Sideshow |
| 15 May | Choir of Hard Knocks |
| 11 June | Dorothy the Dinosaur |
| 26 June | Carbon Cops |
| 18 July | Bindi the Jungle Girl |
| 7 August | South Side Story |
| 5 September | Summer Heights High |
| 7 October | Rain Shadow |
| 14 October | The Abbey |
| 16 October | Not Quite Art |
| 31 October | The Librarians |

| | SBS TV debuts |
| Date | Program |
| 5 February | Podlove |
| 19 March | Wilfred |
| 11 April | Eco House Challenge |
| 6 June | Bluelist Australia |
| 9 June | Kick |
| 8 July | The Circuit |
| 28 July | Great Australian Albums |
| 6 August | Marx and Venus |
| 24 August | HotSpell |
| 26 September | Parent Rescue |
| 10 October | Newstopia |
| 17 October | Is Your House Killing You? |
| 6 December | East West 101 |

| | Seven Network debuts |
| Date | Program |
| 29 January | The Rich List |
| 18 February | Australia's Got Talent |
| 18 April | Last Chance Learners |
| 6 May | Live 'N Local Up Close |
| 11 June | Dorothy the Dinosaur |
| 18 June | The Morning Show |
| 9 July | Surf Patrol |
| 17 July | RSPCA Animal Rescue |
| 29 July | Australia's Best Backyards |
| 27 August | City Homicide |
| 21 October | National Bingo Night (Axed after 6 weeks) |

| | Nine Network debuts |
| Date | Program |
| 29 January | 1 vs. 100 |
| 5 February | The Code: Crime and Justice (Renamed Crime and Justice for the repremiere on 29 May) |
| 16 February | Kings of Comedy |
| 26 February | The Catch-Up (Axed after 16 weeks) |
| February | Code Blue |
| 3 March | My Home |
| 31 March | The Music Jungle |
| 2 April | Footy Classified |
| 6 May | The Lost Tribes |
| 5 June | The Nation |
| 7 June | Ralph TV |
| 19 June | Lockie Leonard |
| 5 July | Sea Patrol |
| 17 July | Things To Try Before You Die |
| 31 July | The Mint |
| 20 August | Sharky's Friends |
| 18 September | Surprise Surprise Gotcha |
| 24 September | Commercial Breakdown |
| 24 September | Just for Laughs |
| 24 September | Royal Flying Doctor Service |
| 24 September | Emergency |
| 7 October | Dirty Jobs |
| 7 October | Going Places |
| 7 October | The Singing Bee |
| 11 October | The Gift |
| 24 October | The Farmer Wants a Wife |
| 27 November | Dogstar |
| 18 December | In the Line of Fire |
| 21 December | Best of Australia |

| | Network Ten debuts |
| Date | Program |
| 7 February | The Con Test |
| 18 February | Celebrity Dog School |
| 15 February | Saving Babies |
| 31 May | Teen Fit Camp |
| 26 September | Are You Smarter Than a 5th Grader? |
| 26 October | Friday Night Download |
| 11 November | Animalia |

| | Regional and Community television debuts |
| Date | Program | Channel |
| 25 June | Susie | WIN Television |
| 20 July | Our Melbourne | C31 Melbourne |

=== Subscription television ===
| Program | Channel | Debut date |
|---|---|---|
| Dangerous | Fox8 | 16 January |
| The Lair | MTV | 26 January |
| The Pub with One Beer | The LifeStyle Channel | 12 March |
| Freestyle | Channel [V] | 21 March |
| NRL Teams | Fox Sports 3 | 23 March |
| Erotic Star | Arena | 24 March |
| Before the Bounce | Fox Sports 1 | 30 March |
| Eco Report | Sky News | 1 April |
| Neil Perry: High Steaks | The LifeStyle Channel | 21 May |
| Cash Cab | Channel [V] | 5 June |
| Confidential | Fox8 | 6 June |
| The Best in Australia | The LifeStyle Channel | 16 June |
| Fish Out of Water | Fox8 | 5 July |
| The Singing Office | Fox8 | 9 September |
| Chandon Pictures | Movie Extra | 10 November |
| Thanks for Listening - The History of Australian Radio | The History Channel | 18 November |
| Runway to LA | Fox8 | 21 November |
| Chefs Christmas | The LifeStyle Channel | 3 December |
| Satisfaction | Showcase | 5 December |
| Stuart MacGill Uncorked | LifeStyle Food | 8 December |

== New international programming ==
| Program | Channel | Debut date |
|---|---|---|
| (Canada) Yam Roll | ABC2 | 21 January |
| (United States) / (Canada) Growing Up Creepie | ABC TV | 27 February |
| (Canada) 6Teen | ABC2 | 6 March |
| (Canada) Monster Warriors | ABC TV | 7 March |
| (France) / (Canada) Kaput and Zösky: The Ultimate Obliterators | ABC2 | 7 March |
| (United States) Wow! Wow! Wubbzy! | ABC TV | 22 March |
| (United Kingdom) Shaun the Sheep | ABC TV | 27 March |
| (Canada) Grossology | ABC TV | 6 April |
| (Canada) My Goldfish Is Evil! | ABC TV | 17 April |
| (Canada) Carl Squared | ABC2 | 27 April |
| (Republic of Ireland) Fluffy Gardens | ABC TV | 10 May |
| (United Kingdom) Life on Mars | ABC TV | 20 May |
| (Republic of Ireland) / (Germany) / (United Kingdom) Skunk Fu! | ABC TV | 28 May |
| (United Kingdom) The Roman Mysteries | ABC TV | 5 June |
| (United Kingdom) Hyperdrive | ABC TV | 27 June |
| (Japan) Ergo Proxy | ABC2 | 3 July |
| (Canada) Captain Flamingo | ABC TV | 4 July |
| (United States) WordGirl | ABC TV | 11 July |
| (United Kingdom) The Spooky Sisters | ABC TV | 9 August |
| (United Kingdom) / (Canada) Dinosapien | ABC TV | 14 August |
| (Japan) Noein: To Your Other Self | ABC2 | 21 August |
| (United Kingdom) Mama Mirabelle's Home Movies | ABC TV | 11 September |
| (France) / (Belgium) SamSam | ABC TV | 17 September |
| (Australia) / (United States) The Upside Down Show | ABC TV | 17 October |
| (Iceland) LazyTown | ABC TV | 22 October |
| (United Kingdom) Monarchy | ABC TV | 27 November |
| (Canada) Ruby Gloom | ABC2 | 4 December |
| (United States) / (Canada) Peep and the Big Wide World | ABC TV | 2007 |
| (Canada) Wilbur | ABC TV | 2007 |
| (United States) It's a Big Big World | ABC TV | 2007 |
| (Canada) The Latest Buzz | ABC TV | 2007 |
| (United Kingdom) The Complete Guide to Parenting | ABC TV | 26 December |
| (United Kingdom) Jam & Jerusalem | ABC TV | 28 December |

| | SBS TV new international programming |
| Date | Program |
| 15 April | (United States) / (Germany) 2057 |
| 14 May | (Argentina) If the Dead Could Speak |
| 3 June | (United States) Big Love |

| | Seven Network new international programming |
| Date | Program |
| 6 January | (United States) / (Canada) Get Ed |
| 31 January | (United States) Heroes |
| 5 February | (United States) Brothers & Sisters |
| 15 February | (United States) Starveillance |
| 17 February | (United States) Mickey Mouse Clubhouse |
| 18 February | (United States) Ugly Betty |
| 18 February | (United States) What About Brian |
| 27 March | (United Kingdom) Shaun the Sheep |
| 19 May | (United States) The Replacements |
| 12 July | (United States) Age of Love |
| 22 July | (France) / (Japan) Ōban Star-Racers |
| 23 July | (United States) Sons & Daughters |
| 6 August | (United States) In Case of Emergency |
| 6 August | (United States) Shark |
| 7 August | (United States) The Knights of Prosperity |
| 15 August | (United Kingdom) Murder Squad |
| 18 August | (Canada) / (South Korea) Pucca |
| 4 October | (United States) Bionic Woman |
| 12 November | (United States) Pepper Dennis |
| 2 December | (New Zealand) Wild Vets |
| 2 December | (United States) Whacked Out Sports |
| 3 December | (United States) 30 Rock |
| 4 December | (United States) Six Degrees |
| 5 December | (United Kingdom) Man's Work |

| | Seven HD new international programming |
| Date | Program |
| 27 March | (United Kingdom) Shaun the Sheep |
| 22 December | (United States) Day Break |

| | Nine Network new international programming |
| Date | Program |
| 23 January | (United States) Blue Collar TV |
| 29 January | (United States) Justice |
| 3 March | (United States) Ben 10 |
| 4 March | (United Kingdom) True CSI |
| 5 March | (United States) Snip and Tuck: Miami |
| 28 April | (United Kingdom) Primeval |
| 15 May | (United States) Hell's Kitchen |
| 29 May | (New Zealand) Neighbours at War |
| 9 September | (United States) Codename: Kids Next Door |
| 10 September | (United States) i-Caught |
| 10 September | (United States) Girls of the Playboy Mansion |
| 16 September | (United States) Damages |
| 22 October | (United States) Viva Laughlin (Axed after 2 episodes) |
| 3 December | (United States) The Big Bang Theory |
| 11 December | (New Zealand) Police Ten 7 |
| 12 December | (United States) Moonlight |
| 15 December | (United States) Go, Diego, Go! |
| 31 December | (United Kingdom) Inferno 999 |
| 31 December | (New Zealand) Deadly Surf |

| | Network Ten new international programming |
| Date | Program |
| 12 January | (Japan) Naruto |
| 1 April | (United States) Pussycat Dolls Present: The Search for the Next Doll |
| 18 June | (United Kingdom) Torchwood |
| 21 June | (United States) Pirate Master |
| 27 August | (United States) Californication |
| 23 September | (United States) Alien Racers |
| 3 October | (United States) Life |
| 28 November | (United States) Cane |
| 2 December | (United States) Don't Forget the Lyrics! |
| 4 December | (United States) Psych |
| 5 December | (United States) The Starter Wife |
| 6 December | (United States) Journeyman |
| 8 December | (New Zealand) Orange Roughies |

=== Subscription television ===
| Program | Channel | Debut date |
|---|---|---|
| (United States) High Maintenance 90210 | E! | February |
| (United States) Nightmares and Dreamscapes: From the Stories of Stephen King | Movie Extra | 6 January |
| (United States) Flavor of Love | VH1 | 10 January |
| (United States) ego trip's The (White) Rapper Show | VH1 | 12 February |
| (United States) Cory in the House | Disney Channel | 2 February |
| (United States) Bam's Unholy Union | MTV | March |
| (United States) My Fair Brady | VH1 | 1 March |
| (United States) Chasing Farrah | VH1 | 5 March |
| (United Kingdom) One Year to Pay Off Your Mortgage | The LifeStyle Channel | 7 March |
| (United States) Craft Corner Deathmatch | The LifeStyle Channel | 17 March |
| (United Kingdom) Admission Impossible | The LifeStyle Channel | 18 March |
| (United Kingdom) Wife Swap | The LifeStyle Channel | 24 March |
| The Real Good Life | The LifeStyle Channel | 26 March |
| (United States) Brotherhood | Showtime | 2 April |
| (United Kingdom) I Want a Garden | The LifeStyle Channel | 19 April |
| (United Kingdom) Swinging | UKTV | 30 April |
| (United States) I'm From Rolling Stone | MTV | May |
| (United Kingdom) Dickinson's Real Deal | The LifeStyle Channel | 5 May |
| (United Kingdom) Colin & Justin's Wedding Belles | The LifeStyle Channel | 8 May |
| (United Kingdom) The Unteachables | UKTV | 6 June |
| (United Kingdom) Man vs Wild | Discovery Channel | 6 June |
| (United Kingdom) Relocation, Relocation | The LifeStyle Channel | 6 June |
| (United Kingdom) Colin & Justin on the Estate | The LifeStyle Channel | 12 June |
| (United Kingdom) Dom Joly's Happy Hour | The LifeStyle Channel | 23 June |
| (United States) Scarred | MTV | July |
| (United States) Dirty Jobs | Discovery Channel | 4 July |
| (United Kingdom) Your Money or Your Wife | The LifeStyle Channel | 3 July |
| (United Kingdom) Selling Houses Abroad | The LifeStyle Channel | 4 July |
| (United States) Sunset Tan | E! | 4 July |
| (United Kingdom) Daisy Does America | UKTV | 23 July |
| (United States) Mad Men | Movie Extra | 7 August |
| (United Kingdom) Say No to the Knife | The LifeStyle Channel | 8 August |
| (United Kingdom) The Real Extras | The LifeStyle Channel | 8 September |
| (United Kingdom) Life Begins Again | The LifeStyle Channel | 21 September |
| (United States) Room 401 | MTV | October |
| (United Kingdom) Dream Homes | The LifeStyle Channel | 1 October |
| Underdogs | The LifeStyle Channel | 8 October |
| (United Kingdom) Rick Stein and the Japanese Ambassador | The LifeStyle Channel | 19 October |
| (United States) K-Ville | Fox8 | 7 October |
| (United States) Kimora: Life in the Fab Lane | E! | 9 October |
| (United States) I Hate My 30's | VH1 | 16 October |
| (United States) Wizards of Waverly Place | Disney Channel | 19 October |
| (Canada) George of the Jungle | Disney Channel | 20 October |
| (United States) Don't Tell My Mother That I'm In... | Nat Geo Adventure | 4 November |
| (United States) Incredible Human Machine | National Geographic Channel | 4 November |
| (United States) Living With Ed | How To Channel | 5 November |
| (United States) Keeping Up with the Kardashians | E! | 5 November |
| (United Kingdom) Ross Kemp on Gangs | Crime & Investigation Network | 7 November |
| (United States) My Brilliant Brain | National Geographic Channel | 9 November |
| (United Kingdom) Getting on the Property Ladder | The LifeStyle Channel | 14 November |
| Au Pairs | The LifeStyle Channel | 23 November |
| (United States) The Firing Line | BBC World | 17 November |
| (United States) The World's Richest People | Discovery Travel & Living | 25 November |
| (United States) The Riches | Showcase | 3 December |
| (United States) Rock of Love | VH1 | 3 December |
| (United States) Gossip Girl | Fox8 | 4 December |
| (United States) Dexter | Showcase | 6 December |
| (United Kingdom) Mayhem at the Manor | The LifeStyle Channel | 13 December |
| (United States) Dirt | Movie Extra | 15 December |

== Specials ==
| Program | Channel | Debut date |
|---|---|---|
| (United States) Winnie the Pooh: Springtime with Roo (Repeat) | Seven Network | 8 April |

== Other debuts ==
| | Telemovies |
| Date | Program | Channel |
Domestic
| 18 March | Joanne Lees: Murder in the Outback | Network Ten |
| 22 April | Curtin | ABC TV |
| 20 May | The King | TV1 |
| 26 August | The King | Nine Network |
International
| 25 March | (United States) / (United Kingdom) Tsunami: The Aftermath – See Note 1 | Nine Network |
| 18 December | (United Kingdom) Superstorm – See Note 2 | Nine Network |
| 23 December | (United Kingdom) / (Canada) The Wind in the Willows | ABC TV |

| | Miniseries |
| Date | Program | Channel |
Domestic
| 13–14 May | Bastard Boys | ABC TV |
| 28 Oct – 18 Nov | Captain Cook: Obsession and Discovery | ABC TV |

| | TV Specials |
| Date | Program | Channel |
Domestic
| 29 January | Ocean's Deadliest | Nine Network |
| 4 March | Cool Aid: The National Carbon Test | Network Ten |
| 4 April | Return of the 707 | Seven Network |
| 6 May | 49th Annual TV Week Logie Awards | Nine Network |
| 8 June | 2007 Antenna Awards | C31 Melbourne |
| 3 July | Desperately Keeping Sheila | SBS TV |
| 20 November | Who Killed Harold Holt? | Nine Network |
| 3 December | Rampant: How a City Stopped a Plague | ABC TV |
| 22 December | 2007 Carols in the Domain | Seven Network / Disney Channel |
| 24 December | 2007 Carols by Candlelight | Nine Network |
| 25 December | The Panel Christmas Wrap 2007 | Network Ten |
International
| 27 February | (United States) Rosie's Family Cruise | SBS TV |
| 29 May | (United States) 2007 Miss Universe Pageant | Seven Network |
| 17 July | (United States) Victoria Beckham: Coming to America | Nine Network |
| 1 December | (United States) Shrek the Halls | Nine Network |
| 1 December | (United States) Super Sleuth Christmas Movie | Seven Network |
| 6 December | (United Kingdom) The Spice Girls: Giving You Everything | Fox8 |
| 7 December | (United Kingdom) The Worst Christmas of My Life | ABC TV |
| 10 December | (United States) 2007 Victoria's Secret Fashion Show | Network Ten |
| 10 December | (Canada) No Past to Speak Of: A Story of Infant Rape in South Africa | ABC TV |
| 10 & 17 December | (United States) The Sixties: The Years That Shaped a Generation | ABC TV |
| 15 December | (United States) Victoria's Secret Fashion Show 2007 | Network Ten |
| 16 December | (United Kingdom) Spice Girls: Giving You Everything | Fox8 |
| 30 & 31 December | (United States) Super Comet: After The Impact | SBS TV |

=== Documentaries ===
==== International ====
| Program | Channel | Debut date |
|---|---|---|
| (United Kingdom) Pets for Profit | The LifeStyle Channel | 5 May |
| Beaty Backlash | The LifeStyle Channel | 11 May |
| (United Kingdom) The Secret Life of the Classroom | The LifeStyle Channel | 13 May |
| Teenage Tycoons | The LifeStyle Channel | 18 May |
| (United Kingdom) Wedding Days | The LifeStyle Channel | 20 May |
| (United Kingdom) The World According to Google | The LifeStyle Channel | 25 May |
| (United Kingdom) The Town's Looking For Love | The LifeStyle Channel | 27 May |
| Flash Families | The LifeStyle Channel | 17 June |
| (United Kingdom) The Real Cost of Going Green | The LifeStyle Channel | 8 July |
| (United Kingdom) DIY RIP | The LifeStyle Channel | 15 July |
| Filthy Rich and Female | The LifeStyle Channel | 22 July |
| (United Kingdom) Burberry Vs. The Chavs | The LifeStyle Channel | 29 July |
| Bye Bye Nine to Five | The LifeStyle Channel | 26 August |
| (United Kingdom) The Secret World of Haute Couture | The LifeStyle Channel | 28 August |
| (United Kingdom) Chelsea Flower Show 2007 | The LifeStyle Channel | 6 September |
| (United Kingdom) How To Steal an Identity | The LifeStyle Channel | 23 September |
| (United Kingdom) The Secret World of Self Storage | The LifeStyle Channel | 7 October |
| (United Kingdom) The Truth About Size Zero | The LifeStyle Channel | 14 October |
| (United Kingdom) The Oldest Drivers in Britain | The LifeStyle Channel | 21 October |
| (United Kingdom) Half the Dog Is Mine | The LifeStyle Channel | 26 October |
| (United Kingdom) Sugar Mummies | The LifeStyle Channel | 28 October |
| (United Kingdom) Body Building Pensioners | The LifeStyle Channel | 16 December |
| (United Kingdom) Christmas Confidential | The LifeStyle Channel | 21 December |

== Programming changes ==
| | Changes to Network Affiliation |
| Date | Program | To | From |
Domestic
| 23 May | Vasili's Garden | SBS TV | Channel 31 Melbourne |
| 19 August | Kath & Kim | Seven Network | ABC TV |
International
| 2 April | (United States) The Young and the Restless | W. | Nine Network |
| 30 April | (United States) Dr. Phil | Network Ten | Nine Network |
| 2 April | (Canada) Little Bear | ABC2 | ABC TV / ABC Kids (now defunct) |
| 3 July | (United Kingdom) Kipper | ABC2 | ABC TV / ABC Kids (now defunct) |
| 24 October | (United States) / (United Kingdom) / (Canada) Fraggle Rock | ABC2 | Network Ten |
| Early 2007 | Sony Pictures Home Entertainment | Nine Network | Network Ten |
| Late 2007 | 20th Century Fox Home Entertainment | Network Ten | Seven Network |
| Late 2007 | Universal Studios Home Entertainment | Seven Network | Network Ten |
| 2 December | (United States) Friends | Network Ten | Nine Network |
| 20 December | (United Kingdom) Rex the Runt | ABC2 | SBS TV |

Below is a list programs which made their premiere on free-to-air television that had previously premiered on Australian Pay TV; a program may still air on the original network.

| | Free-to-air premieres |
| Date | Program | FTA | Pay TV |
| 29 January | Fashion House | Seven Network | W. |
| 3 April | I Shouldn't Be Alive | Nine Network | Discovery Channel |
| 4 April | The Catherine Tate Show | ABC TV | UK.TV |
| 15 May | Hell's Kitchen | Nine Network | UK.TV |
| 4 June | Bargain Hunt | Nine Network | UK.TV |
| 14 August | Crime Investigation Australia | Nine Network | ci |
| 2 December | Who Do You Think You Are? | SBS TV | UK.TV |
| 13 December | (United Kingdom) Ramsay's Kitchen Nightmares | Nine Network | The LifeStyle Channel |

=== Subscription premieres ===
This is a list of programs which made their premiere on Australian subscription television that had previously premiered on Australian free-to-air television. Programs may still air on the original free-to-air television network.

==== Domestic ====
| Program | Subscription network | Free-to-air network | Date |
|---|---|---|---|
| Family Footsteps | The LifeStyle Channel | ABC TV | 2 April |
| The Great Outdoors | The LifeStyle Channel | Seven Network | 4 June |
| What's Good For You | The LifeStyle Channel | Nine Network | 25 November |
| The Real Seachange | The LifeStyle Channel | Seven Network | 14 December |

==== International ====
| Program | Subscription network | Free-to-air network | Date |
|---|---|---|---|
| (United Kingdom) Nighty Night | UKTV | ABC TV | 5 April |
| (United Kingdom) Extras | UKTV | ABC TV | 30 April |
| (United States) 30 Days | The LifeStyle Channel | | 2 March |
| (United Kingdom) Doc Martin | UKTV | ABC TV | 13 May |
| (United Kingdom) Dragons' Den | UKTV | | 2 May |
| (United Kingdom) Hotel Babylon | UKTV | Nine Network | 7 June |
| (United Kingdom) The Worst Week of My Life | UKTV | ABC TV | 3 September |
| (United Kingdom) Casanova | UKTV | ABC TV | 27 September |
| (United Kingdom) Life on Mars | UKTV | ABC TV | 22 October |
| (United Kingdom) Torchwood | UKTV | Ten Network | 11 December |

== Ending this year ==
| | Ending this year |
| Date | Program | Channel | Debut |
| January | The Master | Seven Network | 16 August 2006 |
| 15 February | Storyline Australia | SBS TV | 18 March 2004 |
| 19 February | Podlove | SBS TV | 5 February 2007 |
| 23 February | Kings of Comedy | Nine Network | 16 February 2007 |
| 3 March | Celebrity Dog School | Network Ten | 18 February 2007 |
| 4 March | Fishcam | C31 Melbourne | ? |
| 19 March | Love My Way | Fox8 / W / Showtime | 22 November 2004 |
| 11 April | The Con Test | Network Ten | 7 February 2007 |
| 7 May | Wilfred | SBS TV | 19 March 2007 |
| 16 May | Eco House Challenge | SBS TV | 11 April 2007 |
| 1 June | Bert's Family Feud | Nine Network | 13 February 2006 |
| 10 June | The Lost Tribes | Nine Network | 6 May 2007 |
| 12 June | Choir of Hard Knocks | ABC TV | 15 May 2007 |
| 15 June | The Catch-Up | Nine Network | 26 February 2007 |
| 24 June | Quizmania | Nine Network | 25 July 2006 |
| 27 June | Bluelist Australia | SBS TV | 6 June 2007 |
| 28 June | Hotline | SBS TV | 17 February 1991 |
| 4 July | Last Chance Learners | Seven Network | 18 April 2007 |
| 17 July | Crime and Justice | Nine Network | 5 February 2007 |
| 31 July | Carbon Cops | ABC TV | 26 June 2007 |
| 12 August | The Circuit | SBS TV | 8 July 2007 |
| 29 August | The Nation | Nine Network | 5 June 2007 |
| | HotSpell | SBS TV | 24 August 2007 |
| | Things To Try Before You Die | Nine Network | 17 July 2007 |
| 11 September | South Side Story | ABC TV | 7 August 2007 |
| 13 September | Ralph TV | Nine Network | 7 June 2007 |
| 16 September | Backyard Blitz | Nine Network | 9 April 2000 |
| 23 October | Surprise Surprise Gotcha | Nine Network | 18 September 2007 |
| 24 October | Summer Heights High | ABC TV | 5 September 2007 |
| 28 October | The Abbey | ABC TV | 14 October 2007 |
| 31 October | Not Quite Art | ABC TV | 16 October 2007 |
| 31 October | Parent Rescue | SBS TV | 26 September 2007 |
| 18 November | Rain Shadow | ABC TV | 7 October 2007 |
| 25 November | Going Places | Nine Network | 7 October 2007 |
| 25 November | National Bingo Night | Seven Network | 21 October 2007 |
| 28 November | Is Your House Killing You? | SBS TV | 17 October 2007 |
| 30 November | Temptation | Nine Network | 30 May 2005 |
| 1 December | The Sideshow | ABC TV | 21 April 2007 |
| 5 December | The Librarians | ABC TV | 31 October 2007 |
| 25 December | The Panel Christmas Wrap | Network Ten | 25 December 2003 |
| 26 December | Comedy Inc | Nine Network | 19 February 2003 |
| ?? | Code Blue | Nine Network | February 2007 |

| | Returning this year |
| Date | Program | Channel | Debut |
| 22 October | Who Wants to Be a Millionaire? | Nine Network | 1999 |

== Sporting rights ==
| Sport | Network/s | Games per Week | Breakup of Games | Notes |
|---|---|---|---|---|
| AFL (Australian rules) | Channel Seven; Channel Ten; Fox Sports – Pay-TV | 8 | Channel Seven – 2 Games: Friday Night; Sunday Afternoon; Channel Ten – 2 Games: Saturday Afternoon; Saturday Night LIVE; Fox Sports – 4 Games (All LIVE): Saturday Afternoon; Saturday Evening; Sunday Afternoon; Sunday Twilight | Network Ten will have the Grand Final; Seven Network will broadcast the Brownlow Medal and NAB Cup Grand Final |
| NBL (Basketball) | Fox Sports; Channel Nine | 8 | Fox Sports – All 8 Games LIVE; Channel Nine – Weekly Highlights Package | |
| NRL (Rugby league) | Nine Network; Fox Sports – Pay-TV | 8 | Nine Network – 3 Games: Friday Night AEST 7 – 30 pm – 9 – 30 pm LIVE; Friday Night AEST 9 – 30 pm – 11 – 30 pm Delayed 2 hours; Sunday Afternoon AEST 4 – 00 pm – 6 – 00 pm Delayed 1 hour; Fox Sports – 5 Games: Saturday Afternoon AEST 5 – 30 pm – 7 – 30 pm LIVE; Saturday Night AEST 7 – 30 pm – 9 – 30 pm LIVE; Saturday Night AEST 9 – 30 pm – 11 – 30 pm Delayed 2 hours; Sunday Afternoon AEST 2 – 30 pm – 4 – 30 pm LIVE; Monday Night AEST 7 – 00 pm – 9 – 00 pm LIVE; Also replays of matches broadcast on Channel Nine. | Nine Network broadcast the 2007 NRL Grand Final and 2007 State of Origin series LIVE. |

== See also ==
- 2007 in Australia
- List of Australian films of 2007

== Notes ==
- ^1 Tsunami – The Aftermath was edited from a 2-part miniseries, into a single, 2½ hour telemovie
- ^2 Superstorm was edited from a 3-part miniseries, into a single, 2½ hour telemovie
