= The Real Love Boat (Australian TV series) =

Australian Reality TV Series

- Also known as: The Real Love Boat Australia
- Genre: Reality; Dating game show
- Based on: The Love Boats by Jeraldine Saunders; The Love Boat by Wilford Lloyd Baumes
- Developed by: Chris Culvenor
- Presented by: Darren McMullen
- Starring: Paolo Arrigo; Hannah Ferrier; Daniel Doody
- Theme music composer: Charles Fox; Paul Williams
- Opening theme: "The Love Boat"
- Country of origin: Australia
- Original language: English
- No. of seasons: 1
- No. of episodes: 14

Production
- Executive producers: Chris Culvenor; Paul Franklin; Wesley Dening
- Camera setup: Multi-camera
- Running time: 45–70 minutes
- Production companies: Eureka Productions; Buster Productions

Original release
- Network: Network 10
- Release: 5 October – 17 November 2022

Related
- The Real Love Boat

The Real Love Boat is an Australian reality television series, which premiered on Network 10 on 5 October 2022, and is based on the original television series The Love Boat (later revived as Love Boat: The Next Wave when it moved to UPN in 1998) that aired on ABC from 1977 to 1986. The series takes place on Princess Cruises luxury passenger cruise ship Regal Princess in the Mediterranean. Darren McMullen serves as the host and performs the vocals for the song featured in the series' opening credits.

== Crew ==
- Darren McMullen as Your Host
- Paolo Arrigo as Your Captain
- Hannah Ferrier as Your Cruise Director
- Daniel Doody as Your Head of Entertainment

== Cast ==
Cast Member	Age	Hometown	Occupation	Entered	Status
Harley Anderson	23	Brisbane, Qld	Physiotherapist Assistant	Ep. 4	Winner (Ep. 14)
Moana-Nui "Moana" Berryman	26	Gold Coast, Qld	Dental Receptionist	Ep. 1	Winner (Ep. 14)
Chelsea Murray	28	Brisbane, Qld	Hairdresser	Ep. 2	Runners-up (Ep. 14)
Jesse Anderson	23	Echuca, Vic	Carpenter	Ep. 4	Runners-up (Ep. 14)
Mikaila Norman	23	Gold Coast, Qld	Digital Marketer	Ep. 6	Runners-up (Ep. 14)
Paddy Hughes	27	Sydney, NSW	Chef	Ep. 1	Runners-up (Ep. 14)
Jay Bonnell	30	Wollongong, NSW	Social Enterprise Manager	Ep. 1	Medical (Ep. 13)
Sally Geach	31	Perth, WA	Bridal Designer	Ep. 1	Medical (Ep. 13)
Paul Antoine	28	Perth, WA	Lifestyle Co-ordinator	Ep. 10	Eliminated (Ep. 13)
Courtney Justin	25	Melbourne, Vic	Hospitality Duty Manager	Ep. 6	Quit (Ep. 13)
Jack Kane	34	Sydney, NSW	Carpenter	Ep. 8	Eliminated (Ep. 12)
Katie Langford	25	Rockhampton, Qld	Event Co-ordinator	Ep. 1	Eliminated (Ep. 12)
Keanu Moore	26	Newcastle, NSW	Disability Support Worker	Ep. 10	Eliminated (Ep. 11)
Naomi Tibbles	28	Gold Coast, Qld	Business Manager/Psychology Student	Ep. 1	Eliminated (Ep. 9)
Tyler Grayling	23	Sydney, NSW	Digital Strategist	Ep. 1	Eliminated (Ep. 9)
Daniel "Dan" Goodburn	25	Gold Coast, Qld	Distillery Manager	Ep. 1	Quit (Ep. 9)
Dalton Ford	27	Brisbane, Qld	Personal Trainer	Ep. 1	Quit (Ep. 7)
Christopher "Chris Antos" Antonopoulos	29	Canberra, ACT	Real Estate Agent	Ep. 1	Eliminated (Ep. 6)
Joshua "Josh" Hack	28	Tweed Heads, NSW	Adventure Co-ordinator	Ep. 1	Eliminated (Ep. 6)
Sari Thaiday	24	Cairns, Qld	Retail Assistant	Ep. 1	Eliminated (Ep. 3)
Ben Milne	39	Brisbane, Qld	Wellbeing Coach	Ep. 1	Eliminated (Ep. 1)

== Cast progress ==
	Ep. 1		Ep. 3	Ep. 6	Ep. 7	Ep. 9	Ep. 11	Ep. 12	Ep. 13	Ep. 14
Harley	Not on Boat			Moana	Moana	Moana	Moana	Safe	Safe	Winner
Moana	Paddy	Dalton	Dalton	Harley	Harley	Harley	Harley	Safe	Safe	Winner
Chelsea	Not on Boat		Josh	Dalton	Single	Paddy	Paddy	Safe	Safe	Runners-up
Paddy	Moana	Sari	Tyler	Tyler	Tyler	Chelsea	Chelsea	Safe	Safe	Runners-up
Jesse	Not on Boat			Katie	Mikaila	Mikaila	Mikaila	Safe	Safe	Runners-up
Mikaila	Not on Boat				Jesse	Jesse	Jesse	Safe	Safe	Runners-up
Jay	Sally	Sally	Sally	Sally	Sally	Sally	Sally	Safe	Medical (Ep. 13)	
Sally	Jay	Jay	Jay	Jay	Jay	Jay	Jay	Safe	Medical (Ep. 13)	
Paul	Not on Boat						Courtney	Safe	Eliminated (Ep. 13)	
Courtney	Not on Boat				Single	Jack	Paul	Safe	Quit (Ep. 13)	
Jack	Not on Boat					Courtney	Katie	Eliminated (Ep. 12)		
Katie	Josh	Chris	Chris	Jesse	Single	Single	Jack	Eliminated (Ep. 12)		
Keanu	Not on Boat						Single	Eliminated (Ep. 11)		
Naomi	Daniel	Daniel	Daniel	Daniel	Daniel	Single	Eliminated (Ep. 9)			
Tyler	Dalton	Josh	Paddy	Paddy	Paddy	Single	Eliminated (Ep. 9)			
Daniel	Naomi	Naomi	Naomi	Naomi	Naomi	Quit (Ep. 9)				
Dalton	Tyler	Moana	Moana	Chelsea	Single	Quit (Ep. 7)				
Chris	Sari	Katie	Katie	Single	Eliminated (Ep. 6)					
Josh	Katie	Tyler	Chelsea	Single	Eliminated (Ep. 6)					
Sari	Chris	Paddy	Single	Eliminated (Ep. 3)						
Ben	Single	Eliminated (Ep. 1)								
Notes										
Quit/Medical	none					Dalton, Daniel	none		Courtney, Jay, Sally	none
Cast Off	Ben; Failed to pair up	No; Cast Offs	Sari; Failed to pair up	Chris & Josh; Failed to pair up	No; Cast Offs	Naomi & Tyler; Failed to pair up	Keanu; Failed to pair up	Jack & Katie	No; Cast Offs	Third Place
Cast Off	Ben; Failed to pair up	No; Cast Offs	Sari; Failed to pair up	Chris & Josh; Failed to pair up	No; Cast Offs	Naomi & Tyler; Failed to pair up	Keanu; Failed to pair up	Jack & Katie	No; Cast Offs	Second Place
Cast Off	Ben; Failed to pair up	No; Cast Offs	Sari; Failed to pair up	Chris & Josh; Failed to pair up	No; Cast Offs	Naomi & Tyler; Failed to pair up	Keanu; Failed to pair up	Jack & Katie	No; Cast Offs	First Place

== Episodes ==
No.	Title	Air date	Timeslot	Overnight ratings		Consolidated ratings		Total viewers	Ref(s)
No.	Title	Air date	Timeslot	Viewers	Rank	Viewers	Rank	Total viewers	Ref(s)
1	Episode 1	5 October 2022	Wednesday 7:30 pm	215,000	25	17,000	7	232,000	
2	Episode 2	6 October 2022	Thursday 7:30 pm	174,000	28	28,000	6	202,000	
3	Episode 3	12 October 2022	Wednesday 8:40 pm	129,000	33	—N/a	—N/a	129,000	
4	Episode 4	13 October 2022	Thursday 8:30 pm	205,000	25	24,000	5	229,000	
5	Episode 5	19 October 2022	Wednesday 8:40 pm	141,000	27	—N/a	—N/a	141,000	
6	Episode 6	20 October 2022	Thursday 8:30 pm	149,000	26	—N/a	—N/a	149,000	
