= Love Boat (disambiguation) =

The Love Boat is an American television series that aired from 1977 to 1986.

(The) Love Boat or loveboat may also refer to:

== Music ==
- Loveboat (album), an album by Erasure
- "Love Boat" (song), a theme song for the television series of the same name, sung by Jack Jones
- "Loveboat", song by Kylie Minogue from Light Years

== Television ==
- Love Boat: The Next Wave, a 1998–99 television series
- "The Loveboat", a 1996 episode of The Red Green Show
- "The Love Boat", a 2001 episode of Two Guys and a Girl
- "The Love Boat", a 2013 episode of Revolution

== Other uses ==
- Love Boat (study tour), the Taiwanese youth program
- Pacific Princess (1971), a Princess Cruises ship featured on the original TV show that itself became known as the "Love Boat"
- Minnesota Vikings boat party scandal, an incident involving members of the Minnesota Vikings that has sometimes been referred to as the "Love Boat scandal"

== See also ==
- The Love Boats, a 1974 autobiography by Jeraldine Saunders
- The Real Love Boat, a reality-television reimagined version of the original TV drama
