= Sydney Omarr =

American astrologer

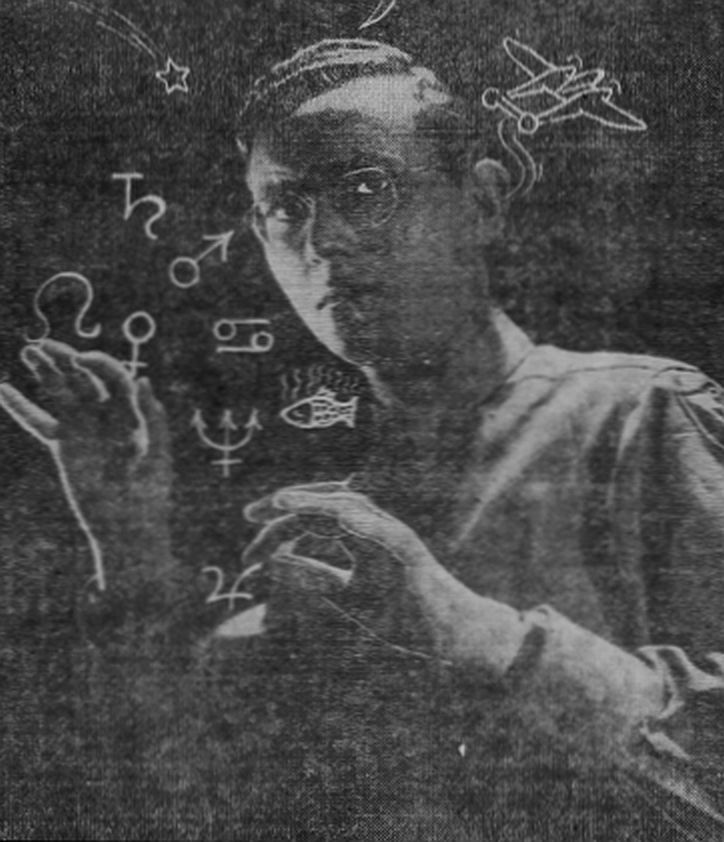
- Born: Sidney Kimmelman; August 5, 1926; Philadelphia, United States
- Died: January 2, 2003 (aged 76); Santa Monica, California, United States
- Education: Mexico City College
- Occupations: Astrologer, media personality
- Spouse: Jeraldine Saunders

Sydney Omarr (August 5, 1926 – January 2, 2003) was an American astrologer and an astrology consultant to the rich and famous. His daily Sun Sign Horoscope column appeared in more than 200 newspapers and his annual forecast books for each sign of the zodiac sold over 50 million copies.

== Early life ==
Omarr was born Sidney Kimmelman in Philadelphia to a middle class Jewish family. His father worked as a grocer. In elementary school, he had a strong interest in magic performances, and he performed at talent shows and magic shops.

Omarr decided to change his name when, at age 15, he saw a movie called Shanghai Gesture starring Victor Mature as a character named Omar, with one "r." He had a strong interest in numerology, which led him to change Sidney to Sydney, and add an extra "r" to Omarr. From this interest in numerology he wrote several books, including Thought Dial, on the topic, but was unable to earn a living as a numerologist so he pursued astrology.

During World War II, Omarr, 17, joined the United States Army; he claimed he chose April 4, 1944 as the day to sign due to the numerological benefit of a date composed of "all fours." Approximately a year later he was transferred to the Air Force at a base located in Ontario, California, approximately 35 miles east of Los Angeles and referred to as 'Camp Hollywood.'

Omarr said that he was posted to Okinawa, Japan within a year of joining the army, and was able to specialize in astrology with his weekly Armed Forces Radio Program Sydney Omarr's Almanac, broadcast throughout the Pacific Theatre. He attempted to predict the results of various sporting contests and events. After gaining transfer to Camp Ontario in April 1945, Omarr was profiled by Wings, the Air Force's official counterpart to Stars and Stripes. In this semi-satirical profile, Omarr is quoted as predicting the Japanese defeat in "mid-August, 1945."

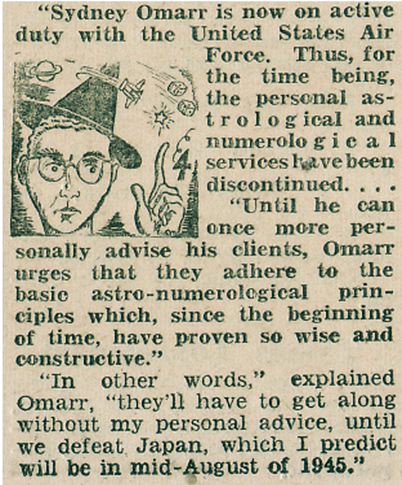
English

Although the author of this piece subsequently stated that this quote was apocryphal and was part of the general satire, Omarr subsequently used it to promote his astrology career, ultimately gaining an influential column at the Los Angeles Times. Omarr also claimed he wrote the horoscope column for the U.S. Army's Stars and Stripes newspaper.

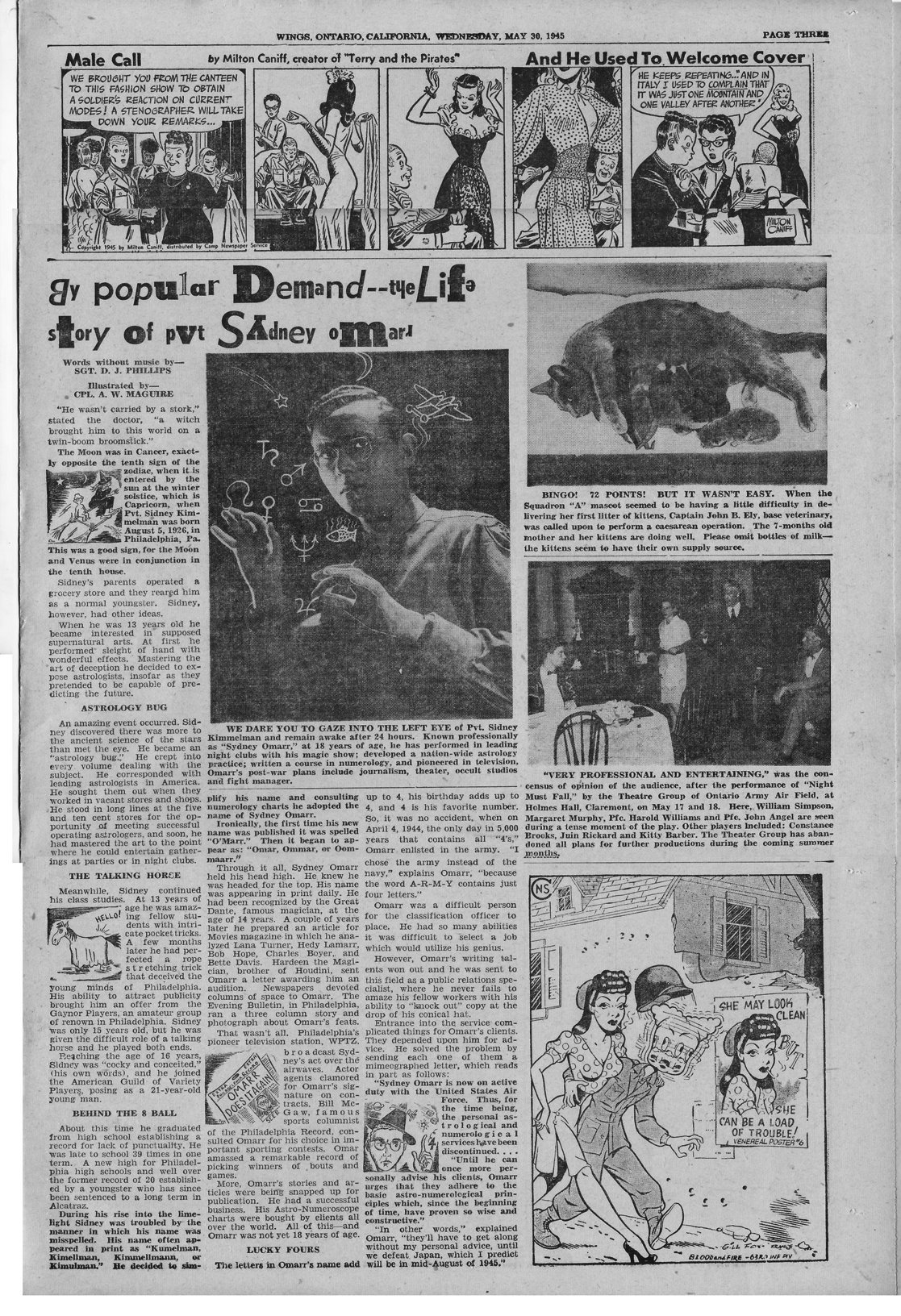
Sydney Omarr Profile, May 30, 1945, WINGS, US Air Force, Page 3

== Career as writer and media astrologer ==
When Omarr completed his stint in the Army, he studied journalism at Mexico City College. This led to a decade as a reporter for the United Press, followed by employment with CBS Hollywood as an editor and radio news director. A journalist colleague at UP, Benson Srere, stated that Omarr was valued by his readers "not because they believe every word he wrote, but because it always contained threads of hope and encouragement."

Toward the end of his life, Omarr wrote a series of astrological guides published by Penguin called Sydney Omarr's Day-By-Day Astrological Guide. While he authored the books up until his death, his proteges have taken over the work, and Signet continues to publish the series. He believed he had been an astrologer in many previous lifetimes, and he was able to do full planetary horoscopes in his head when given an individual's birth coordinates and birth time. For his Los Angeles Times syndicate columns, he wrote each and every daily horoscope column personally, usually three weeks in advance.

Omarr's first book was entitled Sydney Omarr's Private Course on Numerology, which he self-published and sold for $2.00. While he wrote numerous books on the subject of astrology, including My World of Astrology and his autobiography Answer in the Sky, he is probably the most widely known for his books on the popular sun sign astrology. This entailed a daily Sun Sign Horoscope column which appeared in more than 200 daily newspapers of the Los Angeles Times syndicate. Each year, Omarr wrote 12 annual forecasts – one for each sign of the zodiac and one overall book. These popular titles sold 50 million copies.

Sydney Omarr wrote a short pocket book, "Secret Hints... For Men and Women", published by General Features Corporation.

By the 1970s, Omarr appeared on various radio and television shows such as The Merv Griffin Show and The Tonight Show. He was friendly with famous movie actresses like Mae West and associated with authors like Henry Miller and Aldous Huxley. In 1966, he was married for eight months to Jeraldine Saunders, a former model, cruise director, and the creator of the Love Boat book and subsequent TV series concept for ABC Television.

== Later years ==
In 1971, Omarr was diagnosed with multiple sclerosis, and as the disease impacted his body he lost his sight in the early 1990s and became paralyzed from the neck down. He died from a heart attack on January 2, 2003, at the Saint John's Health Center in Santa Monica, California. He is buried in Riverside National Cemetery in Riverside, California.

Omarr is mentioned in Thomas Pynchon's 2009 novel Inherent Vice (p. 34).

== Bibliography ==
- Sydney Omarr's Astrology, Love, Sex, and You (2002) Signet. ISBN 978-0451206930
- My World of Astrology (1982) Wilshire Book Co. ISBN 978-0879801038
- Sydney Omarr's New Millennium Guide (1999 2nd edition) Signet ISBN 978-0451198297
- Sydney Omarr's Astrological Revelations about you Paperback: (1999) Llewellyn Publications ISBN 978-1567185041
- Sydney Omarr's Astrological Guide to Love & Romance (1999)
- Sydney Omarr's Spirit Guides (Sydney Omarr's Astrology) (2003) with Trish MacGregor
