= The Real Love Boat =

- Also known as: The Real Love Boat USA
- Genre: Dating game show
- Based on: The Love Boats by Jeraldine Saunders; The Love Boat by Wilford Lloyd Baumes
- Presented by: Rebecca Romijn; Jerry O'Connell
- Opening theme: "The Love Boat"
- Country of origin: United States
- Original language: English
- No. of seasons: 1
- No. of episodes: 12

Production
- Executive producers: Chris Culvenor; Paul Franklin; Eden Gaha; Jay Bienstock; Wesley Dening; Scott Helmstedter
- Production companies: Raquel Productions; Eureka Productions

Original release
- Network: CBS (season 1A); Paramount+ (season 1B)
- Release: October 5 – December 21, 2022

The Real Love Boat is an American reality romance television series premiered on CBS, airing Wednesday nights beginning October 5, 2022, and is based on the original romantic comedy/drama television series The Love Boat that aired on ABC from 1977 to 1986 and later on moved to UPN (now The CW) for two more seasons from 1998 to 1999 as Love Boat: The Next Wave. The series takes place on Princess Cruises luxury passenger cruise ship Regal Princess in the Mediterranean.

The series is produced by Eureka Productions in association with Buster Productions. Chris Culvenor, Paul Franklin, Eden Gaha, Jay Bienstock and Wesley Dening serve as executive producers for Eureka while Scott Helmstedter is EPing on behalf of Princess Cruises. Rebecca Romijn and Jerry O'Connell serve as hosts and perform the vocals for the song featured in the series' opening credits.

After four episodes with low ratings, CBS moved the show to Paramount+ starting November 2.

An Australian version of the show premiered on Network 10 (CBS' sister network through Paramount Global) from October 5, 2022. It is hosted by Darren McMullen. It also featured Paolo Arrigo as the captain as well.

== Crew ==
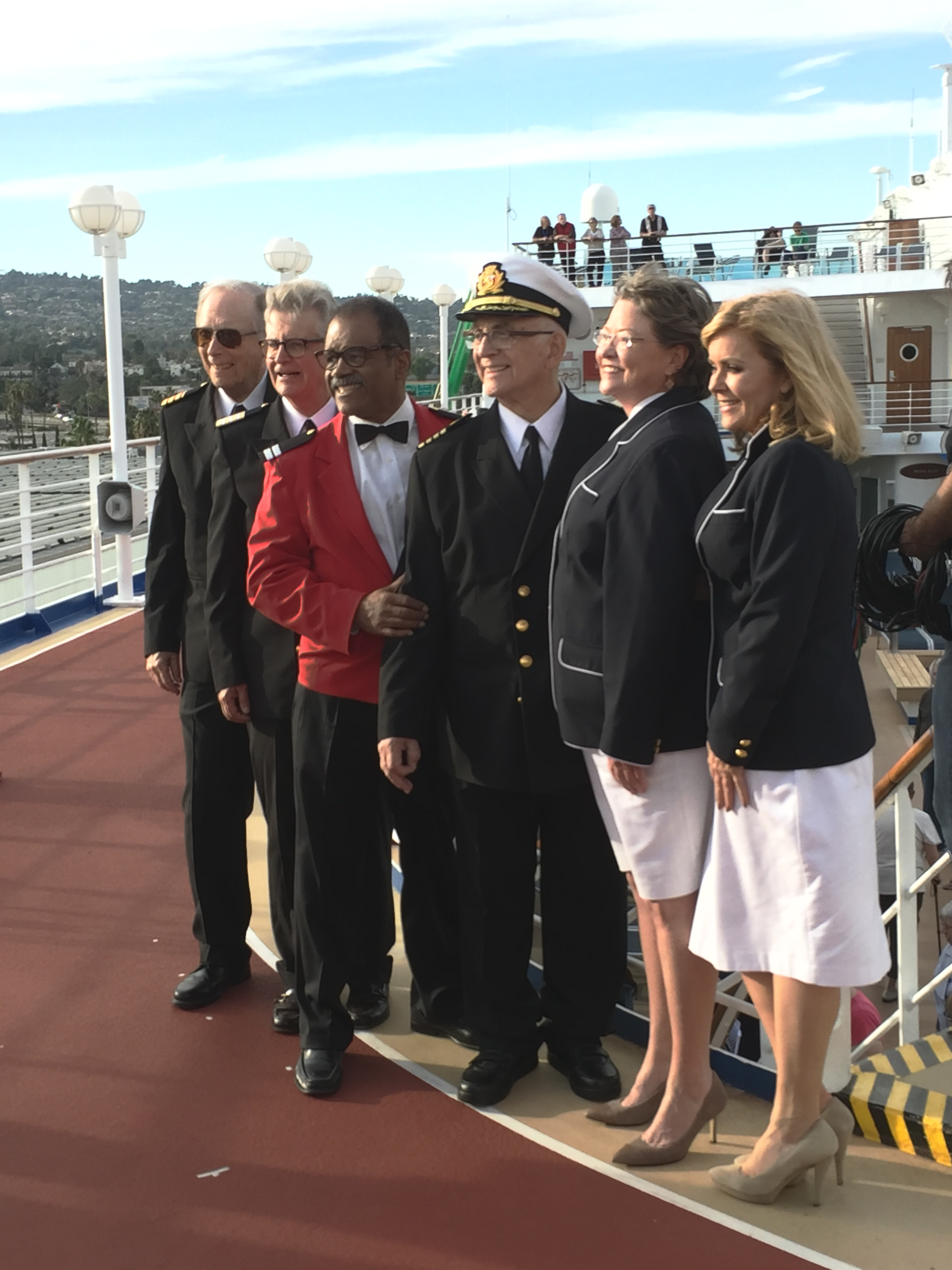
The cast members of original series The Love Boat in costume, 2015; L–R: Bernie Kopell, Fred Grandy, Lange, Gavin MacLeod, Lauren Tewes, and Jill Whelan

- Rebecca Romijn and Jerry O'Connell as Your Hosts
- Paolo Arrigo as Your Captain
- Ezra Freeman and Ted Lange as Your Bartenders
- Matt Mitcham as Your Cruise Director
- Jill Whelan as Your Captain's Daughter

== Cast ==
Cast Member	Age	Hometown	Entered	Status
Emily Stone	24	Colgate, Wisconsin	Ep. 1	Winner (Ep. 12)
Mike Dubreuil	TBD	Toronto, Ontario	Ep. 8	Winner (Ep. 12)
Shea-Lynn Noyes	28	Edmonton, Alberta	Ep. 1	Runner-up (Ep. 12)
Daniel Cooper	25	Atlanta, Georgia	Ep. 1	Runner-up (Ep. 12)
Kendra Yurczyszyn	26	Sydney, Nova Scotia	Ep. 2	3rd Place (Ep. 12)
Jordan Malabanan	26	Windsor, Ontario	Ep. 1	3rd Place (Ep. 12)
Dillon Schlee	29	Postville, Iowa	Ep. 8	Eliminated (Ep. 11)
Marty Hassett	33	Charlotte, North Carolina	Ep. 1	Eliminated (Ep. 11)
Suzanna Ladas	25	Tampa, Florida	Ep. 8	Eliminated (Ep. 11)
Sydney Hausman	24	Sioux Falls, South Dakota	Ep. 6	Eliminated (Ep. 11)
Dustin Lindquist	35	TBD	Ep. 5	Eliminated (Ep. 10)
Bri Donaldson	TBD	Miami, Florida	Ep. 8	Withdrew (Ep. 10)
Nathan Kroger	24	Cincinnati, Ohio	Ep. 1	Eliminated (Ep. 7)
Tyler Campbell	27	TBD	Ep. 6	Eliminated (Ep. 7)
Alisa Shah	24	San Diego, California	Ep. 1	Eliminated (Ep. 6)
Sarah Curd	27	Toronto, Ontario	Ep. 4	Eliminated (Ep. 6)
Dean Lepianka	25	TBD	Ep. 2	Eliminated (Ep. 5)
Ediri Aggreh	34	TBD	Ep. 5	Eliminated (Ep. 5)
Mila Stojsavljevic	30	TBD	Ep. 4	Eliminated (Ep. 4)
Nicole Wong	28	Vancouver, British Columbia	Ep. 1	Eliminated (Ep. 4)
Jay Ajaya Ram	32	TBD	Ep. 3	Eliminated (Ep. 3)
Brooke White	34	Los Angeles, California	Ep. 1	Eliminated (Ep. 2)
Brett De Laura	36	Dana Point, California	Ep. 1	Medical (Ep. 2)
Forrest Jones	30	Houston, Texas	Ep. 1	Eliminated (Ep. 1)
Michael Gonzalez	35	New York, New York	Ep. 1	Eliminated (Ep. 1)

== Cast progress ==
	Ep.1	Ep.2	Ep.3	Ep.4	Ep.5	Ep.6	Ep.7	Ep.8	Ep.9	Ep.10	Ep.11	Final
Emily	Marty	Marty	Marty	Marty	Marty	Marty	Marty	Marty	Marty	Mike	Mike	Winner
Mike	Not on Boat							Bri	Bri	Emily	Emily	Winner
Shea-Lynn	Daniel	Daniel	Daniel	Daniel	Daniel	Daniel	Daniel	Daniel	Daniel	Daniel	Daniel	Runner-up
Daniel	Shea-Lynn	Shea-Lynn	Shea-Lynn	Shea-Lynn	Shea-Lynn	Shea-Lynn	Shea-Lynn	Shea-Lynn	Shea-Lynn	Shea-Lynn	Shae-Lynn	Runner-up
Kendra	Not on Boat	Jordan	Jordan	Jordan	Jordan	Jordan	Jordan	Jordan	Jordan	Jordan	Jordan	3rd Place
Jordan	Nicole	Kendra	Kendra	Kendra	Kendra	Kendra	Kendra	Kendra	Kendra	Kendra	Kendra	3rd Place
Dillon	Not on Boat							Sydney	Sydney	Sydney	Eliminated	
Marty	Emily	Emily	Emily	Emily	Emily	Emily	Emily	Emily	Emily	Suzanna	Eliminated	
Suzanna	Not on Boat							Dustin	Dustin	Marty	Eliminated	
Sydney	Not on Boat					Dustin	Dustin	Dillon	Dillon	Dillon	Eliminated	
Dustin	Not on Boat				Alisa	Sydney	Sydney	Suzanna	Suzanna	Eliminated		
Bri	Not on Boat							Mike	Mike	Withdrew		
Nathan	Alisa	Alisa	Alisa	Alisa	Sarah	Tyler	Eliminated					
Tyler	Not on Boat					Nathan	Eliminated					
Alisa	Nathan	Nathan	Nathan	Nathan	Dustin	Eliminated						
Sarah	Not on Boat			Dean	Nathan	Eliminated						
Dean	Not on Boat	Nicole	Nicole	Sarah	Eliminated							
Ediri	Not on Boat				Eliminated							
Mila	Not on Boat			Eliminated								
Nicole	Jordan	Dean	Dean	Eliminated								
Jay	Not on Boat		Eliminated									
Brooke	Brett	Eliminated										
Brett	Brooke	Medical										
Forrest	Eliminated											
Michael	Eliminated											
Notes												
Medical/Withdrew	none	Brett	none							Bri	none	
Cast Off	Forrest, Michael; Failed to pair up	Brooke; Failed to pair up	Jay; Failed to pair up	Mila & Nicole; Failed to pair up	Dean & Ediri; Failed to pair up	Alisa & Sarah; Failed to pair up	Nathan & Tyler; Daniel & Shea-Lynn's choice to cast off	No; Cast Offs				Jordan & Kendra; Third Place
Cast Off	Forrest, Michael; Failed to pair up	Brooke; Failed to pair up	Jay; Failed to pair up	Mila & Nicole; Failed to pair up	Dean & Ediri; Failed to pair up	Alisa & Sarah; Failed to pair up	Nathan & Tyler; Daniel & Shea-Lynn's choice to cast off	No; Cast Offs				Daniel & Shea-Lynn; Second Place
Cast Off	Forrest, Michael; Failed to pair up	Brooke; Failed to pair up	Jay; Failed to pair up	Mila & Nicole; Failed to pair up	Dean & Ediri; Failed to pair up	Alisa & Sarah; Failed to pair up	Nathan & Tyler; Daniel & Shea-Lynn's choice to cast off	No; Cast Offs				Emily & Mike; First Place

== Episodes ==
No.	Title	Original air/release date	U.S. viewers (millions)
CBS
1	"We're Expecting You"	October 5, 2022	2.41
2	"As Solid as the Rock of Gibraltar"	October 12, 2022	1.91
3	"Get Down and Dirty... And Clean"	October 19, 2022	1.60
4	"Feel the Heat!"	October 26, 2022	1.66
Paramount+
5	"Sharks in the Water"	November 2, 2022	N/A
6	"Betrayal and Regret"	November 9, 2022	N/A
7	"Friends vs Lovers"	November 16, 2022	N/A
8	"The Party Crashers"	November 23, 2022	N/A
9	"If I'm Not Dancin' I'm Cryin'"	November 30, 2022	N/A
10	"Don't Cry Over Spilt Champagne"	December 7, 2022	N/A
11	"Oil Me Up"	December 14, 2022	N/A
12	"And the Winning Couple is..."	December 21, 2022	N/A
