= The King of Comedy =

(The) King of Comedy may refer to:

== People ==
- Jerry Lewis (1926–2017), American comedian, actor, writer and director, nicknamed for his role in the 1982 Martin Scorsese film of the same name
- Dolphy (1928–2012), Filipino actor known as the "Comedy King" in the Philippines.
- Mack Sennett (1880–1960), nicknamed the King of Comedy
- Nagesh (1933–2009), Indian actor and comedian, known as the "King of Comedy" and "Jerry Lewis of India"

== Film ==
- The King of Comedy (film), a 1982 film starring Robert De Niro and Jerry Lewis
- The Original Kings of Comedy, a 2000 Spike Lee film
- The Original Latin Kings of Comedy, a 2002 Jeb Brien film
- King of Comedy (film), a 1999 Hong Kong Television Broadcast film starring Stephen Chow

== Song ==
- "King of Comedy" (song), a song by R.E.M. on their album Monster

== See also ==
- Kings of Comedy (disambiguation)
- Joker (2019 film), inspired by Martin Scorsese's 1982 film The King of Comedy
