= Wilford Lloyd Baumes =

American screenwriter and producer (1939–2026)

- Born: November 24, 1939; Cincinnati, Ohio, U.S.
- Died: June 28, 2026 (aged 86); Cincinnati, Ohio, U.S.
- Occupations: Screenwriter, producer

Wilford Lloyd Baumes (November 24, 1939 – June 28, 2026) was an American screenwriter and television producer known for creating the romantic comedy-drama series The Love Boat, which was based on the 1974 book The Love Boats, by Jeraldine Saunders.

Baumes was the brother of Hayward Hudson Baumes. He mostly worked on some television films including The Dead Don't Die, Nightmare in Badham County, and Alexander: The Other Side of Dawn. Baumes also produced Wonder Woman. He was a resident of Santa Barbara, California.

Baumes died in Cincinnati on June 28, 2026, at the age of 86.
