= Kings of Comedy =

Kings of Comedy may refer to:

- Kings of Comedy (British TV series)
- Kings of Comedy (British musical artist)
- Kings of Comedy (Australian TV series)

== See also ==
- The Original Kings of Comedy, a 2000 American stand-up comedy film
