= Dirty Jobs (Australian TV series) =

- Presented by: Jo Beth Taylor; Ben Dark
- Country of origin: Australia
- No. of episodes: 5

Production
- Running time: 30 Minutes (Including commercials)

Original release
- Network: Nine Network
- Release: 7 October – 4 November 2007

Dirty Jobs was a reality/factual program on the Nine Network, based on the American version of the same name, in which hosts Jo Beth Taylor and Ben Dark are shown performing difficult, strange, and/or messy occupational duties alongside professional workers.

The show premiered following the premiere of the Australian version of The Singing Bee on 7 October 2007. The show managed lacklustre ratings and was removed after five episodes and replaced with Commercial Breakdown.
