= PokerFace =

British game show (2006–2007)

- Genre: Game show
- Created by: Ant & Dec
- Presented by: Ant McPartlin; Declan Donnelly
- Narrated by: Tim Caple
- Country of origin: United Kingdom
- Original language: English
- No. of series: 2
- No. of episodes: 14

Production
- Running time: 60 minutes (inc. adverts)
- Production company: Talkback Thames in association with Gallowgate

Original release
- Network: ITV
- Release: 10 July 2006 – 3 March 2007

PokerFace (also known as Ant & Dec's PokerFace) is a British game show broadcast on ITV, where one person is guaranteed to win £1 million. The show was created by Ant & Dec, who also host it. As implied by the title, PokerFace, is based on the bluffing aspect of poker games. The contestants do not necessarily need to get the questions right in order to win, and can bluff their way through the game and pressure their opponents into folding in order to win.

The show was originally going to be called The Con Test, but the name was changed just weeks before the show began. However, the Australian version is called The Con Test. Series 1 of the show was aired nightly for seven consecutive days (the seventh show being the final), whilst series 2 saw the show moved to a Saturday prime-time slot, lasted for seven weeks.

In 2021, Ant & Dec revealed that TV bosses were interested in reviving PokerFace, but that they themselves were unlikely to present it.

== Background ==
The format of PokerFace was created by Ant & Dec. Originally called The Con Test, the show was announced in March 2006. "We came up with the idea about two years ago and tried it out on our friends - we played it out in a room upstairs at our local pub," Dec said. "It's an exciting game. You don't need great general knowledge, but you need the intelligence to convince the other contestants you know the answers." Ant said: "I don't play poker but I've always liked the idea of bluffing your opponents. This game is all about cunning and being able to hold your nerve."

Paul Jackson, director of entertainment and comedy for ITV, said: "We're delighted to be working with Ant and Dec on this promising new format - but I'm sure the boys won't mind me saying that the real stars of this show are the contestants who have got to be consummate performers if they want to win the million."

== Format ==
Round	Questions	Value	
Round	Questions	Preliminary	Final
1	8	£500 (£4,000)	£1,000 (£8,000)
2	5	£750 (£3,750)	£1,500 (£7,500)
3	5	£1,000 (£5,000)	£2,000 (£10,000)
4	5	£1,250 (£6,250)	£2,500 (£12,500)
5	5	£1,500 (£7,500)	£3,000 (£15,000)
Maximum total		£26,500	£53,000

On each of the first six episodes within a series, six contestants compete for a prize of £50,000 and a place in the £1 million final seventh episode.

Each episode begins with "The Grilling," a segment recorded one day earlier, in which the contestants are brought together to introduce and talk about themselves. They may tell the truth or lie as they see fit, with on-screen prompts indicating honesty or deception for the home viewers' benefit, and clips of their reactions to one another's claims (recorded after the Grilling is complete) are interspersed throughout the segment. The contestants then enter the studio and sit in front of separate screens, each of which displays only that person's score.

The first round consists of eight multiple-choice questions with three answer options each. Contestants have three seconds to lock in their responses, starting after the question and choices have been read, and receive £500 per correct answer. On-screen prompts and a leaderboard are used to show the contestants' performance to the viewers, and at the end of the round, Ant & Dec ask each person how they think they did. As in the Grilling, contestants may tell the truth or bluff at their discretion. All six contestants then stand at a line of podiums, each of which holds a red button, and a slow countdown from 10 begins. The first contestant to push their button (if any) leaves the game or "folds" and keeps all of their winnings; however, if no one does so, the contestant with the lowest total is eliminated and forfeits their money. In the event of a tie for last place, the contestant who answered the round's questions in the slower total time is eliminated. In either case, the departing contestant is briefly interviewed and shown the leaderboard in private. This element would later be used on another game show, Awake, albeit with different rules.

Four more rounds are played in this fashion, each with five questions and a value that increases by £250 per round. After the fifth round, the last player still in the game has their winnings increased to £50,000.

The six winners return for the final, but must put their £50,000 prizes at risk. All question values are doubled (£1,000 in the first round, increasing by £500 per round thereafter). Any contestants who fold keep both their £50,000 and any money they have earned in the final, but eliminated last-place contestants forfeit all of their winnings. The last remaining player has their winnings increased to £1 million. During the final of the second series, the fifth-round countdown started from 15 rather than 10.

For contestants who did not win a game, the maximum potential winnings total was £26,500 in the preliminary episodes. For those who won a game but did not win the final, the maximum total was £53,000 in addition to the £50,000 already won in the preliminaries.

== International versions ==
Country	Name	Host(s)	TV station	Date aired	Regular top prize	Grand final top prize
Australia	The Con Test	Andrew G Brigitte Duclos	Network Ten	7 February – 11 April 2007	A$50,000	none
Brazil	O Jogador	Ana Hickmann; Britto Junior	Rede Record	23 October 2007 – 23 August 2008	R$50,000	none
China	王牌碟中谍; Wangpai die zhong die	Shen Tao; Hua Shao	ZJTV	2012–2014	CN¥ 26,500	CN¥ 38,250 and a free trip to Antarctica (2013) or a car (2014)
Colombia	El Jugador	Andrea Serna; Claudia Bahamón	RCN	2007	COL$200,000,000	none
Hungary	PókerArc	István Vágó; Balázs Sebestyén	RTL Klub	5 November 2007 – 21 December 2008	2,000,000 Ft; 7,000,000 Ft	20,000,000 Ft; 50,000,000 Ft
India	PokerFace: Dil Sachcha Chehra Jhootha	Sharman Joshi	Real TV	2 – 8 March 2009	₹1,000,000	₹10,000,000
Mexico	Doble Cara	Rodrigo Murray	Azteca Trece	26 May 2007 – 7 July 2013	Mex$100,000	none
Norway	PokerFjes	Øyvind Fjeldheim; Cathrine Riis Lilleaas	TV 2	22 May 2007 – 9 March 2008	kr 100,000	kr 1,000,000
Poland	Wielki Poker	Cezary Kosiński; Paweł Burczyk	TVP2	2007	50,000zł	250,000zł
Portugal	Jogo Duplo	José Carlos Malato; Ana Galvão	RTP1	25 August 2008 – 28 March 2010	€10,000	€50,000
Slovakia	Veľký hráč	Peter Kočiš; Ján Dubnička	TV JOJ	17 September 2006 – 24 June 2007	none	1,000,000 Sk
Sweden	PokerFejs	Gry Forssell; Adam Alsing	TV4	2007	kr 200,000	kr 1,000,000
Vietnam	Đấu trí [vi]	Nguyễn Tùng Chi; Lại Văn Sâm	VTV3	29 October 2007 – 5 September 2008	₫15,000,000	₫30,000,000 (semi-final) ₫60,000,000 (final)
