= Tim Caple =

British television sports commentator

- Born: Timothy Paul Caple; Bristol, England
- Education: University of the West of England
- Occupation: Sports commentator
- Website: http://www.timcaple.com

Tim Caple is a British television sports commentator. He is best known for his football and boxing commentary although has commentated on many different sports. He has broadcast for BBC, ITV, Channel 4, Channel 5, Sky Sports, Eurosport, ESPN, Al Jazeera, Canal+ and Globo International. He has also been featured as an in-videogame commentator for the Winter Olympics.

== Football ==
Tim Caple has worked as a TV and radio football commentator since the early 1990s. In that time he has commentated numerous channels and networks, including the BBC, ITV and Channels 4 and 5. In 2013, he can be heard on ESPN, BT Sport and Eurosport.

He has covered every major Club and International Football event around the globe including World Cups and the Champions League.

== Olympics ==
Tim is also a major commentator during Eurosport's coverage of the Summer and Winter Olympics, as well as the Paralympic Games.

In addition to this he has covered the World Athletics Championships from 1997 to the present day as well as a multitude of other events from world championship boxing to fencing and archery.

Tim Caple has also commentated on the Winter Olympics PlayStation 2 game Winter Sports: The Ultimate Challenge.

== PokerFace ==
Caple became the commentator on PokerFace, on ITV in 2006 and in 2007.
