= Storyline Australia =

Storyline Australia is a weekly documentary program, produced and broadcast by SBS TV.

== See also ==
- List of Australian television series
