= Sharky's Friends =

- Genre: Game show
- Presented by: Miranda Deakin
- Country of origin: Australia
- Original language: English
- No. of seasons: 1
- No. of episodes: 65

Production
- Running time: 24 minutes
- Production company: Ambience Entertainment

Original release
- Network: Nine Network
- Release: 6 August – 2 November 2007

Sharky's Friends is an Australian children's television game show that was hosted by Miranda Deakin and featured a quick-witted puppet shark who is named Sharky. The 30-minute show was produced by Ambience Entertainment and was aimed at 8-14 year olds. Sharky competes against children contestants, who are addressed as 'friends', in word games. In each episode, there are two or three friends that separately compete against Sharky to win prizes. If Sharky wins, the contestant receives a "consolation" prize.

The show began in a weekday afternoon timeslot but after two weeks after its debut, was moved to Saturday and Sunday morning timeslots. There have been themed episodes including; a tropical themed episode, a pirate themed episode, a spooky themed episode, yellow themed episode, and numbers and dates themed episode.

== Gameplay ==
Miranda gives clues to a word of which only a portion of the letters are shown. The contestant has a chance to guess what the word is and if they are wrong, Sharky has a chance to guess. If he gets it wrong, which is usually the case, the contestant has another attempt with more letters revealed. This will go on until either one gets it right, in which case they will win a "fish cake", which closely resembles a large inedible cupcake with icing and plastic toy fish. Miranda often says that they will break your teeth if you try to eat them. The first player to win three fish cakes is the winner, and if the child wins 3 nil, it is known as a Shark Blitz. In this case Miranda will ring a special bell.

=== Smelly Telly ===
As well as the word games, a game called Smelly Telly is played, usually when there is a score of 2/1 and never more than twice per show. While a covered raised silver plate is sneaked onto the set, Sharky will sing a song about Smelly Telly which he probably makes up while he goes. Miranda puts blindfolds on the players, one resembling goggles for the contender, and one resembling headphones for Sharky, since he has eyes on either sides of his head. Miranda reveals what the smell is coming from, and even if it is a good smell, the audience will make sounds like it is bad. The players each get a smell, and are allowed to guess and win a fish cake if they are correct. If both players are incorrect, however, unlike the word games, no fish cakes are won, and the players will only get one chance to guess.
