= The Con Test =

Australian television game show

- Created by: Ant & Dec
- Presented by: Andrew G; Brigitte Duclos
- Country of origin: Australia
- Original language: English
- No. of seasons: 1
- No. of episodes: 10

Production
- Production locations: Sydney, New South Wales
- Running time: 60 minutes (inc. commercials)

Original release
- Network: Network Ten
- Release: 7 February – 11 April 2007

The Con Test is an Australian game show which premiered on 7 February 2007 on Network Ten. It was filmed in Sydney and was hosted by Andrew G and Brigitte Duclos.

== Format and Rules ==
Round	Questions	Value	Maximum total
1	8	$500 ($4,000)	$5,000
2	5	$750 ($3,750)	$8,750
3	5	$1,000 ($5,000)	$13,750
4	5	$1,250 ($6,250)	$20,000
5	5	$1,500 ($7,500)	$27,500

The show followed the same general rules and gameplay as the UK show PokerFace. Six contestants began the game facing a total of up to 28 questions for a chance to win $50,000.

Before the game, there was a segment of the show called "The Grilling" where each contestant gave a brief description about themselves (their age, occupation, achievements and qualifications). Some contestants made false claims about their personal status. Their opponents then replied to them with criticism about their claims.

Just before the first two commercial breaks, the viewers were told which two contestants will reveal whether what they were saying was true or false. The truths about the two selected contestants were revealed just before the start of rounds two and three.

Players started by answering several questions each round, which will earn the contestant some money. Each player was spotted with $1,000 at the beginning of the first round. The money earned for each question increased in value in the latter rounds. At the end of each round, the leader board was revealed to the viewers, but not to the contestants. The contestants then had the opportunity to 'fold' if they believe they are at the bottom of the leaderboard and take the money they have earned. If nobody folds, the player with the least amount of money was eliminated with no money. In the event of a tie, the player who answered the questions the fastest would be ranked higher on the leaderboard. The player that was eliminated was taken to the "fold room" where they were met by Duclos and their family and friends. The leaderboard was then revealed to them, hence he/she would find out whether they made the right decision by folding if they went out that way.

The highest possible amount a player could win by folding was $27,500 by answering all 28 questions correctly, then folding at the end of the final round. However, this was unlikely, because a player that answered every single question correctly would not be tempted to take the money would be more likely to go for the top prize of $50,000.

== Production ==
Network Ten reportedly wanted Triple M radio host Fifi Box to co-host the show based on the strength of her recent appearances on Thank God You're Here, but the job eventually went to Box's Triple M colleague, Brigitte Duclos.
