= Parent Rescue =

Australian television documentary about family services

Parent Rescue was a six-part documentary series, produced and broadcast by the SBS. The series explored the exasperating job of raising kids and looked at the role of the family services group Karitane in helping desperate parents.

== See also ==
- List of Australian television series
