= Teen Fit Camp =

- Teen Fit Camp title card
- Genre: Reality Show
- Starring: Gemma Bates, Sam Craven, Thomas Gordon, Jaleesa Donovan and Cristy Wright
- Country of origin: Australia
- Original language: English

Production
- Production location: California
- Running time: 1 hour

Original release
- Network: Network Ten
- Release: June 2007 – July 2007

Teen Fit Camp was an Australian reality show broadcast by Network Ten. It followed a group of overweight Australian teenagers chosen to participate in a special weight loss program.

== Broadcast ==
Teen Fit Camp premiered in June 2007 on Ten in the Thursday 7:30pm time slot. However, despite critical acclaim, after several weeks the series was replaced by Pirate Master and the remaining episodes were aired during a Sunday afternoon slot.
