= Last Chance Learners =

- Genre: Reality
- Presented by: Mike Whitney
- Country of origin: Australia
- Original language: English
- No. of seasons: 1
- No. of episodes: 12

Production
- Production locations: Sydney, Australia
- Running time: 30 minutes (Including commercials)

Original release
- Network: Channel Seven
- Release: 18 April – 4 July 2007

Last Chance Learners was an Australian television program which was created by the Seven Network. The show gave ten learner drivers the chance to be trained by an experienced driving instructor and the opportunity to take their driver's licence test and win a brand new Hyundai Getz.

Last Chance Learners premiered on Wednesday 18 April 2007 at 7:30pm on Channel Seven and was hosted by former Test cricketer and Who Dares Wins host Mike Whitney. After the conclusion of the series final on 4 July 2007, the Seven Network planned a live reunion special, also hosted by Whitney, where all ten learners would talk about their experiences on the show and answer questions from a live studio audience. The special also planned to give away the remaining Hyundai Getzs to lucky home viewers. However, the reunion special was cancelled. Repeats have been shown on 7Two.

The series was also broadcast in the UK on Living2 as Desperate Learners Driving School.

== The learner drivers ==
The ten learner drivers were split up into two teams of five learner drivers each. Each team had its own dedicated driving instructor. The red team instructor was Jann Shipley while the blue team instructor was Chris Breen.

=== Red Team ===
Learner driver	Partner	Driver's Age	Years on learners	Licence test attempts	Test result
Sharni Freeman	Chris Martin	27	12	0	Passed – Episode 11
Virgilia Nielsen	Darren Appleton	19	3	3	Passed – Episode 7
Shannan Wilson	Lee Bollom	28	11	3	Passed – Episode 12
Isabel Sng	John Wong	32	14	0	Quit – Episode 7
David Bester	Darren Balsley	24	3	2	Passed – Episode 12

=== Blue Team ===
Learner driver	Partner	Driver's Age	Years on learners	Licence test attempts	Test result
Simone Woods	Josh Woods	32	16	0	Didn't pass at all
Shaun Favell	Eddie Bray	36	17	4	Didn't pass at all
Robert Giess	Colleen Berry	34	17	0	Passed – Episode 5
Naida Churchill	Lisa Moyle	33	6	0	Passed – Episode 12
Belinda Lemair	Andrew Lemair	32	13	2	Passed – Episode 4

== Episodes ==
#	Air Date	Challenge	Winner	Test-taker	Did they pass?
1	18 April 2007	Pace Car Challenge	Red	N/A	N/A
2	25 April 2007	Emergency Braking	Red	Shannan	No
3	2 May 2007	Reverse Parking on a busy street	Blue	Virgilia	No
4	9 May 2007	Braking on a wet surface	Blue	Belinda	Yes
5	16 May 2007	Reversing through a grid of cars	Blue	Robert	Yes
6	23 May 2007	Night Driving	Red	Naida	N/A – didn't sit test
7	30 May 2007	3-point turn on a hill	Blue	Virgilia	Yes
8	6 June 2007	Finding a parking spot at Paddy's Markets	Red	Naida	No
9	13 June 2007	Country Driving	Red	Shannan	N/A – didn't sit test
10	20 June 2007	Map Navigation	Red	David	No
11	27 June 2007	4WD Challenge	Red	Sharni	Yes
12	4 July 2007	N/A	N/A	David; Naida; Shannan; Shaun; Simone	David, Naida and Shannan finally passed, but Shaun and Simone failed dismally.
