= Royal Flying Doctor Service (TV series) =

- Genre: Reality / Medical; Documentary; Reality/Real-Life
- Narrated by: Steve Bisley
- Country of origin: Australia
- No. of seasons: 1
- No. of episodes: 2

Production
- Executive producer: Julie Hanna
- Running time: 30 minutes (inc. commercials)

Original release
- Network: Nine Network
- Release: 24 September – 1 October 2007

The Royal Flying Doctor Service or RFDS, was an Australian television series on the Nine Network based on the work of the Royal Flying Doctor Service of Australia.

== Overview ==
The series follows the daily working lives of RFDS personnel in Broken Hill and Dubbo, documenting their operations as they respond to emergencies.

== Broadcast history ==
The first two episodes of the program were broadcast on 24 September and 1 October 2007 before being pulled from the schedule. Nine then scheduled the remainder of the series at 7:00 Sunday from 16 March 2008.

== Ratings ==
Episode #	Air Date	Total Viewers
1	24 September 2007	561,000
2	1 October 2007	691,000

== See also ==
- Royal Flying Doctor Service
- RFDS
- The Flying Doctors

== References & External links ==
- http://www.thewest.com.au/default.aspx?MenuID=24&ContentID=41790
- http://www.flyingdoctor.net/
- http://channelnine.ninemsn.com.au/section.aspx?sectionid=6024&sectionname=rfds
