= Going Places (Australian TV series) =

2007 Australian TV series

- Genre: Observational
- Narrated by: Sue McIntosh
- Country of origin: Australia
- Original language: English
- No. of seasons: 1
- No. of episodes: 8

Production
- Producer: John McIntosh
- Running time: 25 minutes

Original release
- Network: Nine Network
- Release: 7 October – 25 November 2007

Going Places was an Australian television series broadcast by the Nine Network in late 2007. It consisted of 8 half-hour-long episodes. Australian actor Sue McIntosh narrated the series, while her husband, John McIntosh, produced.

== Overview ==
The series goes behind the scenes at Australian airline Jetstar as it moves into the highly competitive international market. The focus is on the people who make the airline tick, in particular cabin crew.

It is similar to the British show Airline and its American counterpart, which also follow low cost airlines.

== See also ==
- List of programs broadcast by Nine Network
- List of Australian television series
