= The Love Boat =

American comedy drama TV series (1977–1986)

- Genre: Drama; Romantic comedy
- Created by: Wilford Lloyd Baumes
- Based on: The Love Boats by Jeraldine Saunders
- Starring: Gavin MacLeod; Bernie Kopell; Fred Grandy; Ted Lange; Lauren Tewes; Jill Whelan; Ted McGinley; Pat Klous
- Theme music composer: Charles Fox; Paul Williams
- Opening theme: "The Love Boat" sung by Jack Jones, seasons 1–8; by Dionne Warwick season 9
- Country of origin: United States
- No. of seasons: 9 (+ 5 specials and 3 pilots)
- No. of episodes: 250 (list of episodes)

Production
- Executive producers: Aaron Spelling; Douglas S. Cramer
- Running time: 45–52 minutes
- Production companies: Douglas S. Cramer Productions; Aaron Spelling Productions

Original release
- Network: ABC
- Release: September 24, 1977 – May 24, 1986

Related
- Love Boat: The Next Wave

The Love Boat is an American romantic comedy-drama television series created by Wilford Lloyd Baumes that originally aired on ABC from September 24, 1977, to May 24, 1986. In addition, three TV movies aired before the regular series premiered, and four specials and a TV movie aired after the series ended. The series was set on the cruise ship Pacific Princess, and revolved around the ship's captain Merrill Stubing (played by Gavin MacLeod) and a handful of his crew, with passengers played by guest actors for each episode, having romantic, dramatic, and humorous adventures.

The series was part of ABC's popular Saturday-night lineup of the time, which also included Fantasy Island until 1984. The executive producer for the series was Aaron Spelling, who produced several television series for Four Star Television and ABC from the 1960s into the 1990s.

The series was nominated four consecutive times for a Golden Globe Award for Best Television Series – Musical or Comedy between 1978 and 1981, without winning any. Gavin MacLeod and Lauren Tewes also received several Golden Globe nominations for their roles in the series. In 1997, the episode with segment titles "Hidden Treasure", "Picture from the Past", and "Ace's Salary" (season 9, episode 3) was ranked No. 82 on TV Guide's 100 Greatest Episodes of All Time list.

== Episodes ==
| Season | Episodes | Originally released | |
| Season | Episodes | First released | Last released |
|---|---|---|---|
| Pilots | 3 | September 17, 1976 | May 5, 1977 |
| 1 | 25 | September 24, 1977 | May 20, 1978 |
| 2 | 27 | September 16, 1978 | May 12, 1979 |
| 3 | 28 | September 15, 1979 | May 3, 1980 |
| 4 | 28 | October 25, 1980 | May 16, 1981 |
| 5 | 29 | October 3, 1981 | May 15, 1982 |
| 6 | 29 | October 2, 1982 | May 7, 1983 |
| 7 | 27 | October 1, 1983 | May 12, 1984 |
| 8 | 27 | September 22, 1984 | May 4, 1985 |
| 9 | 25 | September 28, 1985 | May 24, 1986 |
| Specials | 5 | November 21, 1986 | February 12, 1990 |

== Cast ==
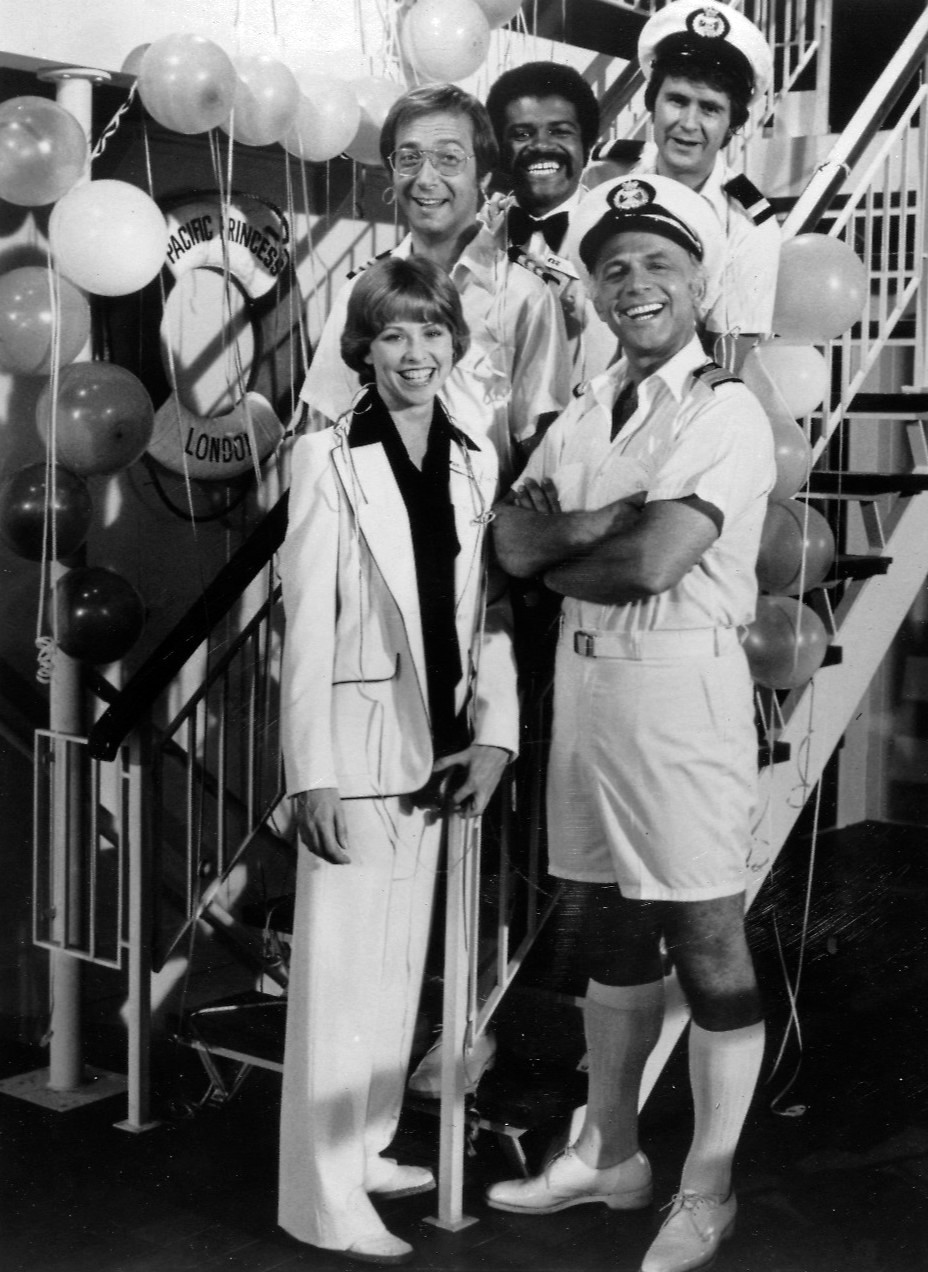
Original cast in a program premiere publicity photo 1977

- Gavin MacLeod as Captain Merrill Stubing
- Bernie Kopell as the ship doctor, Adam "Doc" Bricker; Kopell played a different character, Dr. O'Neill, in the second pilot film, The Love Boat II.
- Fred Grandy as purser Burl "Gopher" Smith (seasons 1–6), chief purser (seasons 7–9)
- Ted Lange as bartender Isaac Washington (seasons 1–9, four specials), yeoman purser (made-for-TV movie)
- Lauren Tewes as cruise director Julie McCoy (seasons 1–7, four specials, plus a guest appearance in season 9)
- Jill Whelan as Vicki Stubing, the captain's daughter (guest appearance in season 2, seasons 3–9, four specials, made-for-TV movie)
- Ted McGinley as the ship photographer, Ashley "Ace" Covington Evans (seasons 7–9), yeoman purser (four specials)
- Patricia Klous as Judy McCoy, Julie's sister and successor as cruise director (seasons 8–9)

MacLeod, Kopell and Lange are the only cast members to appear in every episode of the TV series, the four specials as well as the last made-for-TV movie. Grandy appeared in every episode throughout the run of the series, but he did not appear in the four specials nor in the last TV movie, as he was campaigning for the first of his four consecutive terms in the U.S. House of Representatives. MacLeod was not the captain of the Pacific Princess in the first two pilot TV movies and did not appear in them, although when his character was introduced, it was mentioned that he was the new captain; indeed, none of the series cast members appeared in the first pilot, which had a different captain and crew.

Among the series' attractions was the casting of well-known actors in guest-starring roles, with many famous film stars of prior decades making rare television appearances. The Love Boat was not the first comedy series to use the guest-star cast anthology format—Love, American Style had used the formula seven years earlier—but it had such success with the formula that future series in similar style (such as Supertrain and Masquerade) drew comparisons to The Love Boat. The series was followed on Saturday nights on ABC by Fantasy Island, which was also produced by Aaron Spelling and had a similar format. In all, thirty-two past and future Academy Award winners guested on The Love Boat, including the Best Actress from the first awards ceremony in 1929, Janet Gaynor.

In the final season, a troupe of dancers who performed choreographed routines, often to current hits, was introduced. The Love Boat Mermaids were made up of Tori Brenno (Maria), Debra Johnson (Patti), Deborah Bartlett (Susie), Macarena (Sheila), Beth Myatt (Mary Beth), Andrea Moen (Starlight), Teri Hatcher (Amy) and Nanci Lynn Hammond (Jane).

| Character | Portrayed by | Position | Pilots | | | Seasons | | | | | | | | | Specials | |
| Character | Portrayed by | Position | (Note: TV movie: The Love Boat) | (Note: TV movie: The Love Boat II) | (Note: TV movie: The New Love Boat) | 1 | 2 | 3 | 4 | 5 | 6 | 7 | 8 | 9 | 1–4 | (Note: TV movie: The Love Boat: A Valentine Voyage) |
|---|---|---|---|---|---|---|---|---|---|---|---|---|---|---|---|---|
| Merrill Stubing | Gavin MacLeod | Your Captain | (Note: Thomas Ford, played by Ted Hamilton, was the captain in the first pilot.) | (Note: Captain Madison, played by Quinn Redeker, was the captain in the second pilot.) | Main | Main | Main | Main | Main | Main | Main | Main | Main | Main | Main | Main |
| Dr. O'Neill | Bernie Kopell | Your Ship's Doctor | (Note: The role of Dr. O'Neill was played by Dick Van Patten in the first pilot.) | M | | | | | | | | | | | | |
| Adam "Doc" Bricker | Bernie Kopell | Your Ship's Doctor | | | Main | Main | Main | Main | Main | Main | Main | Main | Main | Main | Main | Main |
| Burl "Gopher" Smith | Fred Grandy | Your Yeoman Purser | (Note: The role of Gopher Smith was played by Sandy Helberg in the first pilot.) | Main | Main | Main | Main | Main | Main | Main | Main | Main | Main | Main | | |
| Isaac Washington | Ted Lange | Your Bartender | (Note: The role of Isaac Washington was played by Theodore Wilson in the first pilot.) | Main | Main | Main | Main | Main | Main | Main | Main | Main | Main | Main | Main | |
| Isaac Washington | Ted Lange | Your Yeoman Purser | | | | | | | | | | | | | | M |
| Julie McCoy | Lauren Tewes | Your Cruise Director | (Note: Gerry, played by Terry O'Mara, was the cruise director in the first pilot.) | (Note: Sandy Summers, played by Diane Stilwell, was the cruise director in the second pilot.) | Main | Main | Main | Main | Main | Main | Main | Main | | G | M | |
| Judy McCoy | Patricia Klous | Your Cruise Director | | | | | | | | | | | M | M | | |
| Vicki Stubing | Jill Whelan | — | | | | | G | Main | Main | Main | Main | Main | Main | Main | Main | Main |
| Ashley "Ace"; Covington Evans | Ted McGinley | Your Ship's Photographer | | | | | | | | | | Main | Main | Main | | |
| Ashley "Ace"; Covington Evans | Ted McGinley | Your Yeoman Purser | | | | | | | | | | | | | M | |
| Emily Stubing (Note: In the four episodes of season 9 in which she appears, her maiden name is Haywood until she marries Captain Stubing in the season finale.) | Marion Ross | — | | | | | | | | | | | | R | M | |

== Production ==
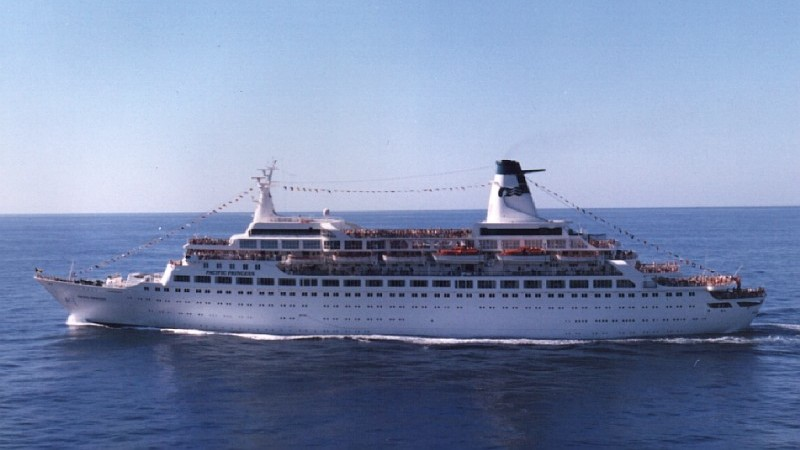
Pacific Princess, the main vessel used on the show, off the US West Coast in 1987

The original 1976 made-for-TV movie (titled The Love Boat), that served as the pilot for the series, was based on the nonfiction book The Love Boats by Jeraldine Saunders, a real-life cruise director for a passenger cruise-ship line. Saunders was also partly inspired by the German cruise ship MV Aurora. The pilot was followed by two others (titled The Love Boat II and The New Love Boat), all of which aired before the series began in September 1977.

The one-hour sitcom was set aboard Pacific Princess, at the time a real-life Princess Cruises cruise ship. The Pacific Princess' twin sister vessel Island Princess was also used for the show, especially if the show's schedule conflicted with Pacific Princess's cruises or her annual drydocking. Based in the port of Los Angeles, the ship's regular ports of call were Puerto Vallarta, Acapulco and Mazatlán. The series was primarily filmed on sets in southern California: 20th Century Fox Studios for seasons one through five, and the Warner Hollywood Studios for the remainder of the series, and occasionally filmed aboard the actual vessels. Regardless of where the episode was filmed, the actual ship was extensively shown in the establishing shots.

Along with use of the real-life Pacific Princess and Island Princess, the series was permitted to use some iconography owned by Princess Cruises. For example, Princess' logo is frequently visible in the establishing shots of the vessels, in the backgrounds of sets and even on props, such as name tags for the ship's crew. However, the ownership of this fictional representation of the Pacific Princess is never explicitly stated as being Princess Cruises; instead, characters would use terms such as "the line" or "the company" in reference to the entity that owned and operated Pacific Princess.

Episodes set and filmed in European and East Asian locations became more frequent instead of the usual west coasts along the Pacific shore of North America as the show continued. They traditionally aired as season premieres or during the sweeps months of February, May, and November. Ships used in these episodes were: SS Stella Solaris for an Aegean Sea cruise and an Italian cruise, MS Pearl of Scandinavia for a Chinese cruise, Royal Viking Sky for a Scandinavian cruise, MS Vistafjord for an Iberian cruise, and Royal Princess and Sun Princess for Caribbean Sea cruises. In 1981, P&O Cruises' line Sea Princess was also used for the two-hour episode "Julie's Wedding", set in and around Australia.

The "star of the show", the Pacific Princess, after being renamed MS Pacific and being sold then owned by another cruise line in Spain, was scrapped in Aliağa, Turkey, in 2013 after no further buyer could be found. Her sister ship, Island Princess, which was later renamed MV Discovery, was scrapped in Alang, India in 2015 after she too failed to find a new owner. Both vessels' scrappings were controversial, but the previous owners justified it by saying that they were getting too old to continue operating.

=== Writing format ===
Every episode contained several storylines, each written by a different set of writers working on one group of guest stars. Thus, episodes have multiple titles referencing its simultaneous storylines, e.g., the first episode of season one is "Captain & the Lady / Centerfold / One If by Land".

Each episode typically featured three storylines. Storylines focused on members of the crew, the interactions between passengers and crew members, a single passenger, or interactions between several passengers. The three storylines usually followed a similar thematic pattern: One storyline (typically a "crew" one) was straight-ahead comedy. The second would typically follow more of a romantic comedy format (with only occasional dramatic elements). The third storyline would usually be the most dramatic of the three, often offering few (if any) laughs and a far more serious tone. A common plotline focused on a romance that had gone sour, with the parties reconciling at the end of the episode.

On rare occasions, there were crossovers between stories. In one episode, actors Robert Reed and Florence Henderson, formerly of The Brady Bunch, guest-starred in separate segments. In one scene, the two bump into each other at a buffet table, exchange a questioning look, shrug, and continue on their separate ways.

=== Laugh track ===
The series was also distinctive as being one of the few hour-long series ever made for American television that used a laugh track.

=== Theme song and title sequence ===
The Love Boat theme song was composed by Charles Fox with lyrics by Paul Williams. It was sung by Jack Jones in the opening sequence of the first eight seasons and, in a different arrangement, by Dionne Warwick in the last season and the four specials that followed it. Charo, who had also recorded and commercially released the song, performed it within the show in one of her guest appearances. The opening sequence of the TV movies featured an instrumental version of the song without the lyrics. Instrumental variations of the song were extensively used throughout the series as incidental music.

The opening sequence for the series underwent three major changes over the years. From seasons one to eight, the opening sequence began with a long shot of the ship in dock before the camera slowly zoomed in onto its bridge area. This was followed by posing shots of the crew members at different points on the ship or the set, revealed with a weighing anchor graphic wipe. These posing shots were updated several times throughout all seasons due to cast changes. The long shot footage of the ship was used for the credits of the celebrity guest stars. For only the first season, the guest stars were credited by having their names appear on the screen while a radar/compass style circle with four hearts wrapped around them. Beginning with season two (and originally tested in the fifteenth episode of the first season), the compass was graphically put in place and at its center, the guest stars were shown posing for the camera on different parts of the set, the ship or on-location in special episodes, while their names appeared at the bottom of the screen. For the final season, the compass was replaced by a crescent wave and the long shot of the ship was replaced by a montage of the various locations traveled to on the series. At the center of the wave graphic, the guest stars were shown posing for the camera wearing their formal outfits against different colored backgrounds.

=== Broadcast and syndication ===
The Love Boat aired in reruns on ABC Daytime from June 30, 1980, to June 12, 1981, and from September 14, 1981, to June 24, 1983, at 11:00 a.m. EST/10:00 CST. The show entered the syndication market in the United States in September 1983, with Worldvision Enterprises handling distribution. As an alternative for stations with tight scheduling commitments, Worldvision offered edited 30-minute episodes in addition to the original hour-long programs beginning in the fall of 1986 after the series completed its original run on ABC. It is currently distributed in syndication by its successor CBS Media Ventures. The series can currently be seen on MeTV Sunday afternoons at 5:00 PM ET/4:00 PM CT and on sister network Catchy Comedy Monday through Friday afternoons at 3:00 PM ET/2:00 PM CT. Catchy also has done occasional weekend binges of the show as well. The Love Boat is currently airing 24/7 on its own channel on Pluto TV under the "Classic TV" section, only airing the regular 9 season run.

== Home media ==
CBS DVD (distributed by Paramount) has released seasons 1–4 of The Love Boat on DVD in Region 1. Each season has been released in two-volume sets.

| DVD name | Ep no. | Release dates | | | Bonus features |
| DVD name | Ep no. | Region 1 | Region 2 | Region 4 | Bonus features |
|---|---|---|---|---|---|
| Season 1, Volume 1 | 12 | March 4, 2008 | September 1, 2008 | April 10, 2008 | Episodic promos |
| Season 1, Volume 2 | 12 | August 12, 2008 | September 1, 2008 | October 2, 2008 | The New Love Boat (TV movie pilot); Episodic promos |
| Season 2, Volume 1 | 13 | January 27, 2009 | N/A | September 2, 2009 | Episodic promos |
| Season 2, Volume 2 | 12 | August 4, 2009 | N/A | December 24, 2009 | Episodic promos |
| Season 3, Volume 1 | 14 | January 17, 2017 | N/A | N/A | Episodic promos |
| Season 3, Volume 2 | 14 | January 17, 2017 | N/A | N/A | Episodic promos |
| Season 4, Volume 1 | TBA | October 2, 2018 | N/A | N/A | Episodic promos |
| Season 4, Volume 2 | TBA | October 2, 2018 | N/A | N/A | Episodic promos |

== Reception ==
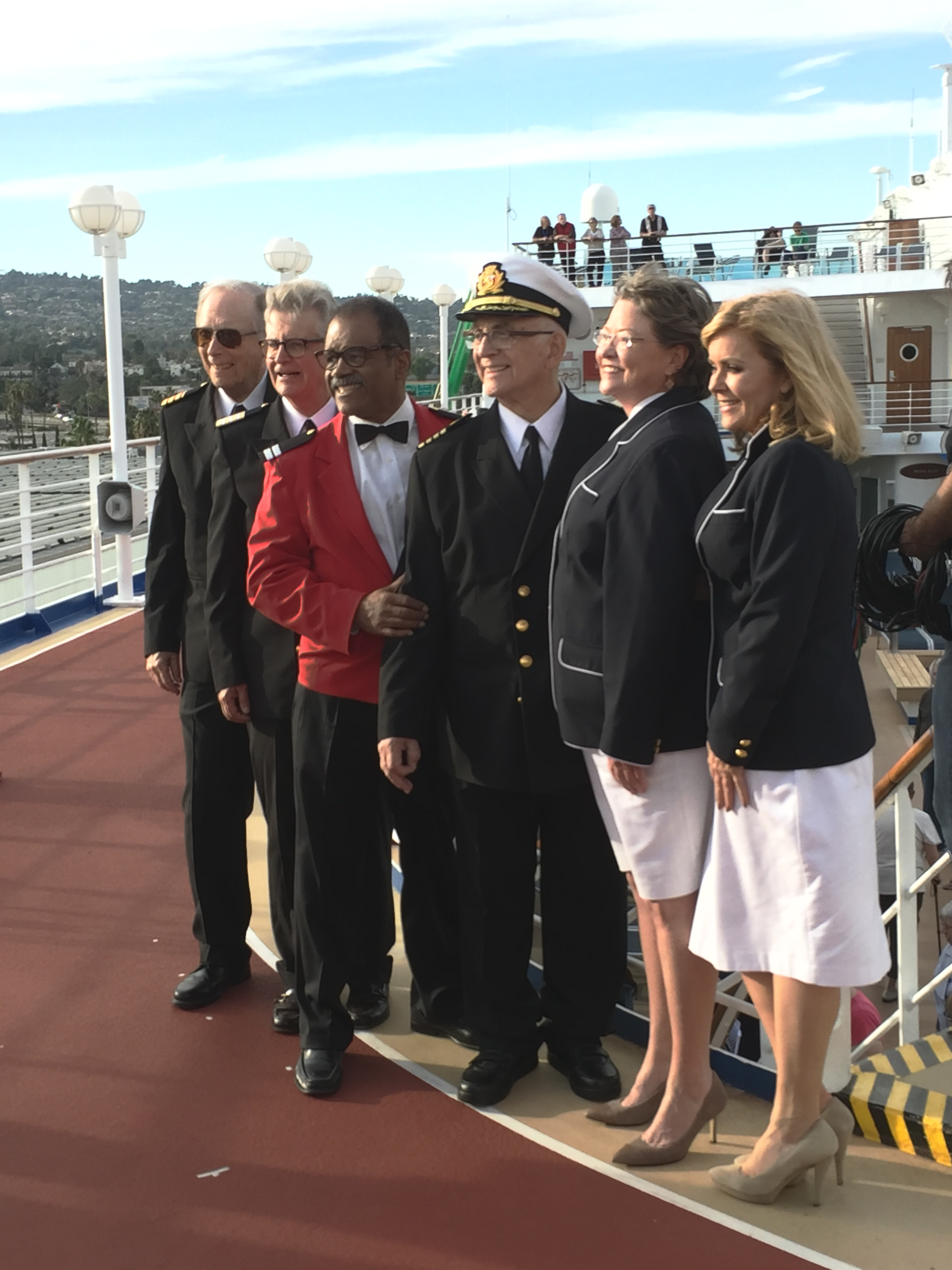
The cast members in costume, 2015; l–r: Kopell, Grandy, Lange, MacLeod, Tewes & Whelan

For its first seven years, The Love Boat was very successful in the ratings. During that time, it usually ranked among the top 20, and sometimes even the top 10. However, the show fell out of the Top 30 during the 1984–85 season, and after falling out of the Top 50 during the 1985–86 season, The Love Boat was canceled after nine years on ABC, although four three-hour specials aired during the 1986–87 season.

=== U.S. television ratings ===
| Season | TV season | Rank | Rating | Ref. |
|---|---|---|---|---|
| 1 | 1977–78 | #16 | 21.9 | |
| 2 | 1978–79 | #17 | 22.1 | |
| 3 | 1979–80 | #24 | 20.6 | |
| 4 | 1980–81 | #5 | 24.3 | |
| 5 | 1981–82 | #15 | 21.2 | |
| 6 | 1982–83 | #9 | 20.3 | |
| 7 | 1983–84 | #17 | 19.0 | |
| 8 | 1984–85 | #34 | 15.3 | |
| 9 | 1985–86 | #62 | 12.7 | |

== Accolades ==
In 1997, the episode with segment titles "Hidden Treasure", "Picture from the Past", and "Ace's Salary" (Season 9, Episode 3) was ranked No. 82 on TV Guide's 100 Greatest Episodes of All Time list.

In 2014, Fred Grandy, Bernie Kopell, Ted Lange, Gavin McLeod, Cynthia Lauren Tewes, and Jill Whelan became godparents (the passenger ship industry's equivalent of naval ship sponsors) of the Princess Cruises ship Regal Princess.

On May 23, 2017, the original cast (MacLeod, Kopell, Grandy, Lange, Tewes and Whelan) reunited on Today, where it was announced they would be receiving a joint star on the Hollywood Walk of Fame for their contributions to television, sponsored by Princess Cruises.

=== Golden Globe Awards ===
| Year | Category | Nominee(s) | Result | Ref. |
|---|---|---|---|---|
| 1978 | Best Television Series – Musical or Comedy | - | Nominated | |
| 1978 | Best Actor – Television | Gavin MacLeod | Nominated | |
| 1979 | Best Television Series – Musical or Comedy | - | Nominated | |
| 1980 | Best Television Series – Musical or Comedy | - | Nominated | |
| 1980 | Best Actor – Television | Gavin MacLeod | Nominated | |
| 1981 | Best Television Series – Musical or Comedy | - | Nominated | |
| 1981 | Best Actor – Television | Gavin MacLeod | Nominated | |
| 1981 | Best Supporting Actress – Television | Lauren Tewes | Nominated | |

=== Primetime Emmy Awards ===
| Year | Category | Nominee(s) | Episode | Result | Ref. |
|---|---|---|---|---|---|
| 1978 | Outstanding Lead Actor for a Single Appearance in a Drama or Comedy Series | Will Geer | "The Old Man and the Runaway" | Nominated | |
| 1978 | Outstanding Art Direction for a Comedy Series | Paul Sylos, Eugene Harris, Bob Signorelli, John McCarthy Jr. | - | Nominated | |
| 1978 | Outstanding Cinematography in Entertainment Programming for a Series | Lloyd Ahern | "The Inspector/A Very Special Girl/Until the Last Goodbye" | Nominated | |
| 1978 | Outstanding Film Editing in a Comedy Series | Norman Wallerstein, Robert Moore | "Masquerade/The Caper/Eyes of Love/Hollywood Royalty" | Nominated | |
| 1983 | Outstanding Directing for a Comedy Series | Bob Sweeney | "The Dog Show" | Nominated | |

=== People's Choice Awards ===
| Year | Category | Result | Notes | Ref. |
|---|---|---|---|---|
| 1977 | Favorite New TV Comedy Program | Won | Tied with Three's Company | |

== Sequels, spin-offs and crossovers ==
The 1979 two-hour season premiere of Charlie's Angels —another Aaron Spelling series— that introduced Shelley Hack as new angel Tiffany Welles was titled "Love Boat Angels" and its characters attempted to recover stolen museum artifacts while aboard the Pacific Princess on a cruise to the Virgin Islands with all of The Love Boat regulars having cameo appearances.

A 1994 Saturday Night Live sketch featuring guest host Patrick Stewart merged The Love Boat with Star Trek: The Next Generation. Stewart played the captain while caricatures of Deanna Troi and Geordi La Forge played the cruise director and bartender, with Kopell having a cameo appearance as Doc.

A two-part 1997 Martin episode, "Goin' Overboard", had the main characters going on a cruise and encountering Isaac, Julie, Doc, and Vicki.

=== Revival ===
A revival of the series, titled Love Boat: The Next Wave, aired on UPN from 1998 to 1999 for two seasons and twenty-five episodes. Set aboard the cruise ship Sun Princess, the series starred Robert Urich as Captain Jim Kennedy, a retired United States Navy officer, Phil Morris as chief purser Will Sanders, and Heidi Mark as cruise director Nicole Jordan. Several members of the original show's cast guest-starred on a reunion-themed episode in which it was revealed that Julie and Doc had been in love all along.

=== The Real Love Boat ===
In March 2022, both CBS and Australia's Network 10 (both Paramount-owned networks) commissioned The Real Love Boat, a reality dating competition series to be produced by Eureka Productions. The series features single contestants on a luxury Mediterranean cruise as they participate in challenges and dates to stay on the boat in the hopes of finding love, with those unsuccessful being progressively dumped from the cruise. As contestants are dumped, new contestants come aboard the cruise. In the end, the last couple remaining wins the series and is awarded a large cash prize as well as a cruise from Princess Cruises.

The American version is hosted by married actors Jerry O'Connell and Rebecca Romijn. This version briefly aired on Wednesday nights at 9/8C on CBS starting on October 5, 2022, before being moved to Paramount+. The Australian version is presented by Darren McMullen. This version also premiered on 5 October 2022 and aired on Wednesdays and Thursday nights on 10.

== Influence ==
CNN reported industry experts credit the show with increasing interest in the cruise industry, especially for those that were not newlyweds or senior citizens, and for the resulting demand to spur investment in new ships instead of conversions. The influence was particularly notable for Princess Cruises, a line that partnered with the series and received a great deal of attention as a result.

Princess Cruises has embraced its connection to the series in its marketing. Actor Gavin Macleod was appointed the line's global ambassador in 1986 and appeared in television advertisements and other campaigns for Princess for over 30 years. Actress Jill Whelan is currently Princess' Celebrations Ambassador and has appeared in online videos promoting the line. The series' primary cast were named the godparents for and participated in the christening of two Princess Cruises ships, the Dawn Princess in 1997 and the Regal Princess in 2014. Members of the cast have participated in themed cruises honoring the series, most recently in 2022 and 2024, with another cruise scheduled for November 2025.
