= Darren McMullen =

Scottish television and radio presenter and personality

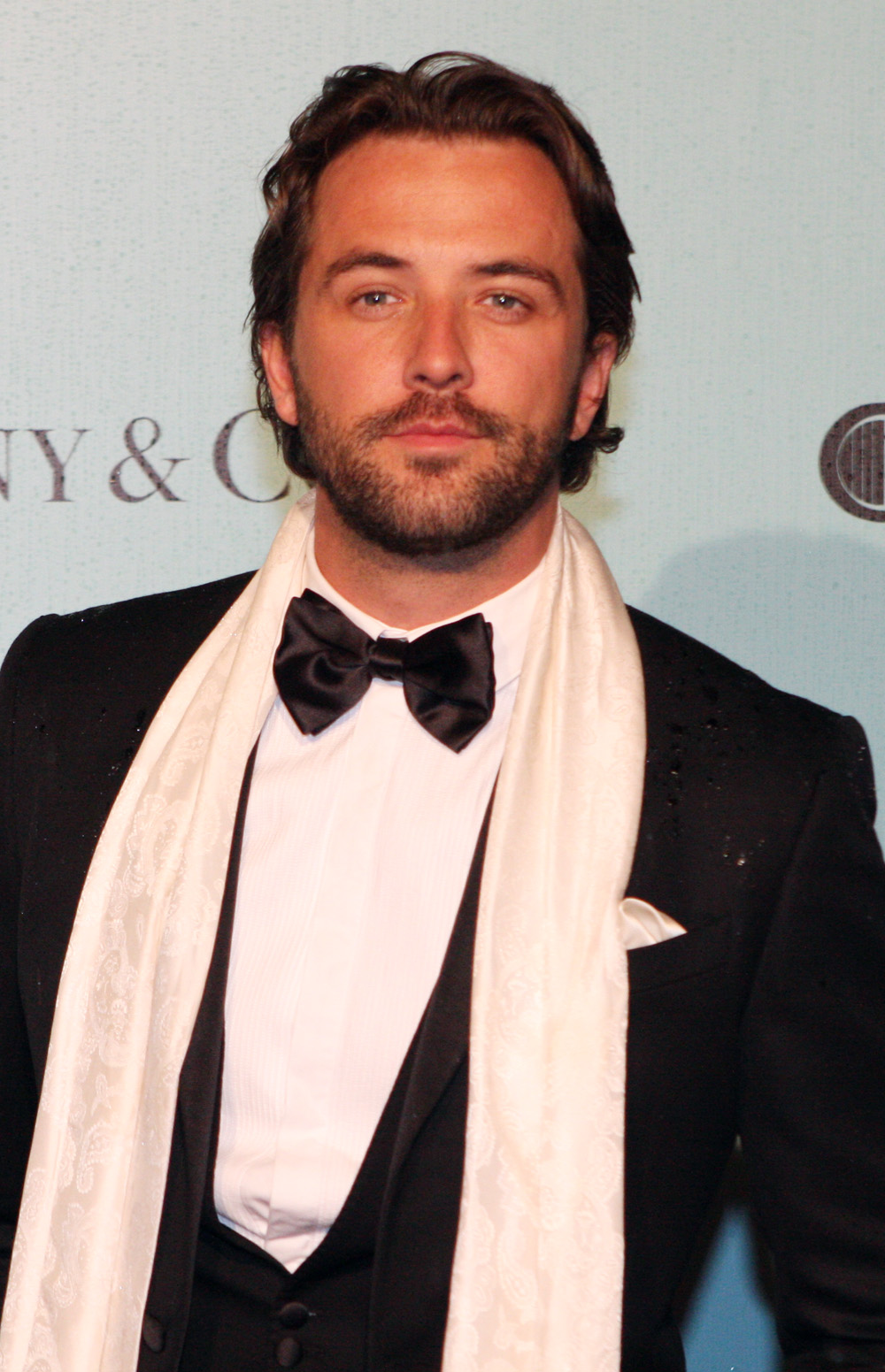
- McMullen at the Sydney premiere of the 2013 film The Great Gatsby
- Born: 10 February 1982 (age 44); Glasgow, Scotland
- Occupation: TV presenter
- Years active: 2000s–present
- Employer(s): Nine Network (until 2016; 2020); Seven Network (2016–2020)
- Known for: The Voice Kids (2014); The Voice (2012–2015; 2020); Minute to Win It (2010); Commercial Breakdown (2009)
- Partner: Crystal Reed (July 2013 – early 2019)
- Website: darrenmcmullen.tv

Darren McMullen (born 10 February 1982) is a Scottish-Australian television and radio presenter and personality, music journalist and music critic. He was born in Glasgow, Scotland, and emigrated with his family to Australia at the age of 12. He is best known as the co-host of The Voice Australia. Prior to his career as a presenter, he was a student at Bradfield College and then an advertising executive.

In August 2019, McMullen performed as the 'Prawn' in the first season of The Masked Singer Australia.

== Career ==
McMullen's career as a host and presenter began as a presenter with Arena's Exclusive news on Foxtel and with appearances in major advertising campaigns for Westfield and Gloria Jean's. Darren appeared weekly on MTV Australia's The Lair in 2007 and 2008. In addition to hosting on The Lair, McMullen also hosted a monthly car DVD called Ignition.

In 2009, he hosted Commercial Breakdown on the Nine Network. In 2010, McMullen signed with the Seven Network as host of their new primetime game show Minute to Win It.

On 29 June 2011, McMullen debuted as the host of the prime-time reality show Love in the Wild on NBC in the US and CTV in Canada. McMullen also returned to his native United Kingdom to host the British version of Minute to Win It on ITV2 (which was cancelled after one eight-episode season) and hosted Series 2 of The Magicians on BBC One.

It was announced that McMullen would host The Voice Australia when it debuted in 2012. For the first and second seasons in 2012 and 2013, McMullen co-hosted the show with Faustina Agolley. He took over as a solo host in Season 3 in 2014 and then was joined by Nine Network personality Sonia Kruger for Season 4 in 2015. McMullen announced via social media that he was leaving The Voice after four seasons. Sonia Kruger will stay as solo host.

In 2014, McMullen hosted the six-episode series Darren McMullen's Outsiders on National Geographic Channel, which focused on alternative lifestyles taking him on taboo adventures.

In 2014, McMullen was cast as Alex Larden on the drama House Husbands.

On 13 March 2016, it was announced that McMullen had re-joined the Seven Network once again to host a new show, The Big Music Quiz.

In late 2019, McMullen appeared in the first season of The Masked Singer Australia as the Prawn and he was fifth voted out of the show.

In 2022, McMullen competed on the sixth season of The Celebrity Apprentice Australia. He finished the series as the runner-up, raising over $500,000 for his chosen charity Feel the Magic. He is also set to host Australia's version of The Real Love Boat on Network 10.

In 2023, McMullen competed on the seventh season of The Amazing Race Australia with his nephew, Tristan Dougan.

== Personal life ==
McMullen was in a relationship with Crystal Reed from July 2013 to early 2019. McMullen had previously said that the two had planned on marriage and children, but he was not willing to get married until his country of Australia legalised same-sex marriage.
