= Wings (US magazine) =

American military aviation history magazine (1971-2007)

- Categories: aviation, military history, military aviation
- Frequency: 6 per year
- Publisher: Sentry Books / Republic Press, Inc
- Founded: 1971
- Final issue: 2007
- Country: United States
- Based in: Granada Hills, California.
- Language: English
- ISSN: 1067-0637

Wings was a military aviation history magazine published in the United States between 1971 and 2007. The magazine featured articles and photo features covering military aviation from World War I to the modern era, focusing heavily on American aircraft.

== History and profile ==
Wings was first published in 1971 as a bi-monthly schedule, alternating monthly with its sister magazine, Airpower. Until the late 1990s it was published by Sentry Books, Inc., before being sold to Republic Press. Republic ceased publication of Wings and Airpower in May 2007, when the circulation fell below what it considered an economically viable level.

Wings was headquartered in Granada Hills, California.
