= Things To Try Before You Die =

Australian travel show

- Genre: Travel
- Presented by: Jules Lund; Livinia Nixon; Gary Sweet
- Country of origin: Australia
- Original language: English
- No. of seasons: 1
- No. of episodes: 8

Production
- Running time: 60 minutes (including commercials)

Original release
- Network: Nine Network
- Release: 17 July – 4 September 2007

Related
- Getaway (1992 – present)

Things To Try Before You Die (sometimes shortened to Things To Try) was an Australian travel show that was produced by and aired on the Nine Network. Making its debut on 17 July 2007, each episode of the show focused on a particular country and counted down the top 30 things that one 'must try' in that country.

The show was similar to Getaway, a travel show also airing on the Nine Network.

== Presenters ==
- Jules Lund
- Livinia Nixon
- Gary Sweet

== Episodes ==
No.	Title	Original release date
1	"United States"	17 July 2007
1 – Experience zero gravity (Nevada); 2 – Watch a space shuttle launch (Florida); 3 – Party in Miami (Florida); 4 – Go to the Oscars (California); 5 – Experience New York City (New York State); 6 – Fly over the Grand Canyon (Arizona); 7 – Climb El Capitan in Yosemite (California); 8 – Face up to Mount Rushmore (South Dakota); 9 – See Niagara Falls (New York State); 10 – Take in a Vegas show (Nevada); 11 – Experience of Iditarod (Alaska); 12 – Ice skate in New York (New York State); 13 – Ski Aspen (Colorado); 14 – Attend a big sports event (Indiana, Kentucky); 15 – Go to the baseball (California); 16 – Get behind the scenes of L.A. (California); 17 – Visit James Dean's home town (Indiana); 18 – Pay tribute to John Lennon (New York); 19 – Record a song at Elvis' Studio; 20 – Visit the home of Elvis (Memphis ); 21 – Drive Big Sur (California); 22 – Get your kicks on Route 66; 23 – Drop in to Hawaii (Hawaii); 24 – Go to Disneyland (California); 25 – Go to a theme park (California, Florida); 26 – Party at The Palms (Nevada); 27 – Stay in Sinatra's holiday home (Palm Springs); 28 – Storm the desert in a Hummer (Arizona); 29 – Get lost in Las Vegas; 30 – Skydive into Las Vegas (Nevada)
2	"New Zealand"	24 July 2007
1 – Parachute from the North to South Island (Wellington to Picton); 2 – Take the finest walk in the world (Milford Trek); 3 – Holiday like the rich and famous (Rahimoana Villa, Bay of Islands); 4 – Hunker down at Huka Lodge; 5 – Swim with dolphins (Bay of Islands and Whakatane, Bay of Plenty); 6 – Whale watching from the air (Kaikoura); 7 – Swim with wild seals (Kaikoura); 8 – Come face-to-face with an endangered species (kiwi bird); 9 – Try zorbing; 10 – Jump off Sky Tower (Auckland); 11 – Setting foot on a glacier (Fox Glacier); 12 – Dive into the mouth of a volcano (Mount Tarawera); 13 – Visit an active volcano (White Island); 14 – Cruise the Milford Sound; 15 – See Queenstown from the air (helicopter); 16 – Go wine tasting in Marlborough; 17 – Taste NZ's finest oysters (Bluff); 18 – Visit the Art Deco city (Napier); 19 – Learn the haka; 20 – Take a mud bath (Rotorua); 21 – NZ's ultimate snapshots (All Blacks at home; Wellington Cable Car; world's first sunrise); 22 – Ride NZ's best waves (Tauranga); 23 – Dive Poor Knights; 24 – Paddle the Abel Tazman; 25 – Race an America's Cup yacht (Auckland); 26 – Climb Aoraki / Mount Cook; 27 – Heli-ski NZ's tallest mountain (Aoraki / Mount Cook); 28 – Snowboard Treble Cone; 29 – Snowmobile in Queenstown; 30 – Bungy jump where it all began (Queenstown)
3	"Africa"	1 August 2007
30 – Go on an African safari; 29 – Laze in a luxury lodge; 28 – Soak up in Sun City; 27 – Have breakfast with giraffes; 26 – Surf at Jeffery's Bay; 25 – Volunteer at an orphanage; 24 – Sponsor a child; 23 – (Volunteer to) save an endangered animal; 22 – Scope the Skeleton Coast; 21 – Play mum to a baby elephant; 20 – Tarzan through the trees (a treetop canopy tour); 19 – Hangout with gorillas; 18 – Balloon over the Serengeti; 17 – Sail around Zanzibar; 16 – Spend a night in the wilderness; 15 – Spend time with an African tribe; 14 – Witness a voodoo ceremony; 13 – Visit Soweto (largest black township); 12 – Jump with the Masai Mara (traditional tribe); 11 – Try an elephant(-back) safari; 10 – Step off the edge of Africa (via abseiling); 9 – Understand Mandela's struggle; 8 – Visit the cradle of humankind; 7 – Watch the sun rise over the "Garden of Eden"; 6 – Pat a lion ... a small one; 5 – The world's highest bungy (Brooklyn's Bridge, 216 m); 4 – Get wet at Victoria Falls; 3 – Witness the wildebeast (migration); 2 – Climb (Mt) Kilimanjaro; 1 – Swim with great white sharks
4	"Australia"	7 August 2007
30 – See a croc at the Top End (Darwin, N.T.); 29 – See the best sunrise (@ Mt. Kosiosko, N.S.W.); 28 – See the best sunset (whilst on camelback, in Broome, W.A.); 27 – Witness turtles hatching (Gladstone, Great Barrier Reef, Qld.); 26 – Drink wine in Margaret River (W.A.); 25 – Swim with a Whale Shark (Ninnaloo Reef, W.A.); 24 – Walk Cradle Mountain (Tas.); 23 – Jump on a jetfighter (for $1000, in Melbourne, Vic.); 22 – Spend a night underground (Coober Pedy, S.A.); 21 – Eat the best meal in Australia ($195, 10-course, Sydney, N.S.W.); 20 – Learn to surf in Noosa (Qld.); 19 – Check out the Camel Cup (during July, Alice Springs, N.T.); 18 – Watch the Sydney to Hobart (Boxing day, Sydney, N.S.W.); 17 – Walk the Bay of Fires (Tas.); 16 – Visit an outback cattle station (Wrotham, Qld.); 15 – Try bush tucker (Arnham Land, N.T.); 14 – Wander around the Kimberly (N.T.); 13 – 4WD on Fraser (Island, Qld.); 12 – Drive the Great Ocean Road (incl. the 12 Apostles, Vic.); 11 – Take a dip at Bondi (Beach, N.S.W.); 10 – Climb the Coathanger (Sydney Harbour Bridge, Sydney, N.S.W.); 9 – Play like a Playboy (Sydney, N.S.W.); 8 – Ride the Ghan (Adelaide, S.A. to Darwin, N.T.); 7 – Fly like a bird (hang gliding over Byron Bay, N.S.W.); 6 – Take on a theme park (Gold Coast, Qld.); 5 – Fish the Top End (Arnham Land, N.T.); 4 – Kayaking at Freycinet ($40 for 2hrs., Tas.); 3 – Sail the Whitsundays (Qld.); 2 – Go to Uluru (N.T.); 1 – Rent your own island (Cape York, Qld.)
5	"France"	14 August 2007
1 – Climb the Eiffel Tower; 2 – Visit Versailles; 3 – Ski the French Alps; 4 – Visit Mont St Michel; 5 – Live the high life at St Tropez; 6 – Experience Bastille Day; 7 – Balloon over the Loire Valley; 8 – Pay your respects at Somme; 9 – Sleep in a chateau; 10 – Drink champagne in Champagne; 11 – Learn to speak French; 12 – Visit Monet's garden; 13 – Visit the Louvre; 14 – Visit the medieval Carcassonne; 15 – Cycle the Tour De France; 16 – Shop in Paris; 17 – Sail around Corsica; 18 – Go to the Cannes Film Festival; 19 – Live it up in Monaco; 20 – Charter a Superyacht; 21 – See a show at Moulin Rouge; 22 – Cruise the Seine; 23 – Learn Fish Cooking; 24 – Drink from the Evian; 25 – Swim in the Mediterranean; 26 – Stay at the Ritz; 27 – Surf Biarritz; 28 – Hire a canal boat; 29 – Try vinotherapy; 30 – Paraglide off Mt Blanc
6	"Middle East / Arabia"	21 August 2007
1 – Visit the Pyramids – Cairo, Egypt; 2 – Spend ANZAC Day at Gallipoli — Turkey; 3 – Visit the birthplace of Jesus — Jerusalem; 4 – Get up close to Petra — Jordan; 5 – Have a Hammam bath — Cairo, Egypt; 6 – Abu Simbel — Egypt; 7 – Stay at the Burj Al Arab — Dubai, UAE; 8 – Dive the Red Sea; 9 – Cruise the Nile; 10 – Temple of Karnak — Luxor, Egypt; 11 – Snow skiing in the desert — Dubai, UAE; 12 – Sand surfing — Dubai, UAE; 13 – Bunk down with the Bedouins — Sinai, Egypt; 14 – Souk shopping — Morocco, Turkey and Dubai; 15 – Experience Luxor Markets — Egypt; 16 – Dubai Desert Experience — UAE; 17 – Dubai World Cup — UAE; 18 – Sail the Arabian fjords — Oman; 19 – Look at Leptis Magna — Libya; 20 – Visit the Cairo Museum — Egypt; 21 – Spend a night in an oasis — Dubai, UAE; 22 – Camel ride in the Sahara — Douz, Tunisia; 23 – Buy your own country — Dubai, UAE; 24 – Live like a king — Dubai, UAE; 25 – Play polo in Dubai; 26 – Learn to belly dance — Cairo, Egypt; 27 – Float in the Dead Sea — Palestinian territories, Israel; 28 – Make it to Mecca, Saudi Arabia; 29 – Visit the birthplace of Jesus — Bethlehem, Palestinian territories; 30 – Sunrise hot air balloon ride over Luxor, Egypt
7	"United Kingdom"	28 August 2007
1 – Go for an Aerobatic flight Glohesthire; 2 – Princess Diana pilgrimage; 3 – See the sunrise at Stonehenge; 4 – Look for the Loch Ness monster; 5 – Eat haggis and blow a bagpipe in Scotland; 6 – Visit Chatsworth; 7 – Be the King of the Castle at Cardiff; 8 – Stroll down a medieval lane in York; 9 – Try a traditional High tea; 10 – Swim the English Channel; 11 – Have a pint in a traditional English pub; 12 – See a West End show at London's West End; 13 – Manchester; 14 – Go to the home of Beatlemania in Liverpool; 15 – Sing with the famous London community gospel choir; 16 – Play golf at St Andrews; 17 – See a soccer match; 18 – Wimbledon; 19 – Cricket at Lord's Cricket Ground; 20 – Drive a Ferrari at Silverstone; 21 – Spend a night in a haunted castle; 22 – Visit a Roman Spa Bath; 23 – Stumble upon Mumbles — Wales; 24 – Visit the birthplace of Shakespeare Stratford-upon-Avon; 25 – Visit Buckingham Palace; 26 – Visit the UK's smartest town Oxford University; 27 – Hear Big Ben chime; 28 – Visit the Royals Church Westminster Abbey; 29 – London Eye; 30 – Spy school
8	"Far East"	4 September 2007
1 – Pat a panda; 2 – See Mt Fuji; 3 – Visit Angkor Wat; 4 – Meet a Geisha; 5 – Walk the Great Wall; 6 – Visit Tibet; 7 – Drink at the World's Tallest Bar; 8 – Sleep in a Capsule Hotel; 9 – Experience Tokyo; 10 – Say a prayer in Shadin Temple; 11 – Have your fortune read; 12 – Ascend the Banue Rice Terraces; 13 – See a dawn procession; 14 – Go to a sumo match; 15 – Eat in the Beijing Night Markets; 16 – Chill out at Sapporo Ice Festival; 17 – Join the Naadam Festival; 18 – See the Cherry Blossoms; 19 – Visit Tiananmen Square; 20 – Enter the Forbidden City; 21 – See the Terracotta Warriors; 22 – Float down the Mekong River; 23 – Go to the Olympics (2008 in Beijing, China); 24 – Cruise the Yangtze River; 25 – Shop in Shanghai; 26 – Ride the World's fastest train; 27 – Come face-to-face with Snow Monkeys; 28 – Kayak along Haong Bay; 29 – Visit the Giant Buddha; 30 – Visit the home of Shaolin

== See also ==
- List of Australian television series
