= Commercial Breakdown (Australian TV series) =

Australian television program

- Presented by: Dermott Brereton (2007); Darren McMullen (2009)
- Country of origin: Australia
- Original language: English
- No. of seasons: 2
- No. of episodes: 9

Production
- Running time: 30 minutes (including commercials)

Original release
- Network: Nine Network
- Release: 24 September 2007 – 21 April 2009

Commercial Breakdown is an Australian light entertainment television program based on the British version of the same name that features humorous television advertisements from around the world. The show first aired on 24 September 2007, and had a first series run of six episodes. The show returned for a second series on 7 April 2009.

The show was placed on hiatus after the third episode of its second season. It is unknown if or when any remaining episodes will screen.

== Hosts ==
The show is hosted by Darren McMullen, an MTV VJ who appears courtesy of MTV Australia. McMullen replaced the show's original host, former Australian rules footballer Dermott Brereton, after the first series.

- Dermott Brereton (2007)
- Darren McMullen (2009)

== Episodes ==
#	Airdate	Timeslot	Ratings (Note: Overall national viewers, numbers in brackets indicate nightly ratings position.)
Series 1 (2007)
1	24 September 2007	Monday 7:30 pm – 8:00 pm	762,000 (—)
2	1 October 2007	Monday 7:30 pm – 8:00 pm	733,000 (—)
3	8 October 2007	Monday 7:30 pm – 8:00 pm	816,000 (—)
4	15 October 2007	Monday 7:30 pm – 8:00 pm	936,000 (—)
5	11 November 2007	Sunday 7:00 pm – 7:30 pm	898,000 (—)
6	18 November 2007	Sunday 7:00 pm – 7:30 pm	985,000 (14th)
Average series one ratings			855,000
Series 2 (2009)
7	7 April 2009	Tuesday 8:00 pm – 8:30 pm	1,135,000 (9th)
8	14 April 2009	Tuesday 8:00 pm – 8:30 pm	1,051,000 (14th)
9	21 April 2009	Tuesday 8:00 pm – 8:30 pm	847,000 (20th)
Average series two ratings			1,011,000
