= Kings of Comedy (Australian TV series) =

- Genre: comedy
- Presented by: Colin Lane
- Country of origin: Australia
- Original language: English
- No. of seasons: 1
- No. of episodes: 2

Production
- Running time: 30 minutes

Original release
- Network: Nine Network
- Release: 16 February – 23 February 2007

Kings of Comedy is an Australian television documentary series on famous comedians, aired on Nine Network in 2007. The presenter was Colin Lane, who was part of the comedy duo Lano and Woodley. The first episode paid tribute to the late comedian Graham Kennedy, as well as Dave Allen and Dudley Moore.

Originally planned as a six-part series, it was cancelled before completing its run. The series was later repeated annually during the TV Week Logies after party.

The series contains scenes from Dave Allen, Peter Cook and Dudley Moore, Graham Kennedy, and The Two Ronnies.
