= Jeraldine Saunders =

American writer (1923–2019)

- Born: Geraldine Loretta Glynn; September 3, 1923; Los Angeles, California, U.S.
- Died: February 26, 2019 (aged 95)
- Occupations: author; lecturer; cruise director; model
- Years active: 1974–2019
- Spouses: Russell Phillips (m. 1942; div. 1950) Sydney Omarr (m. 1966; div. 1966) Arthur Andrews (m. 1972; died 2003)
- Children: Gail Maureen Phillips (1943–1970)

Geraldine Loretta Saunders (September 3, 1923 – February 26, 2019) known under the pen name Jeraldine Saunders was an American writer. Her 1974 book The Love Boats inspired the television series The Love Boat. She also worked as a model, an astrologer, an numerologist and palm reader.

The program was based on her 1974 book, The Love Boats, her anecdotal account of her time employed as the first full-time female cruise director. From 2003 until her death Saunders was the author of Omarr's Astrological Forecast. The nationally syndicated horoscope column, read by hundreds of thousands worldwide, was originally created by Sydney Omarr, to whom she had been briefly married in 1966.

In 1968 Saunders discovered her fiancé, the actor Albert Dekker, dead in his Hollywood home. The death was ruled to be accidental.
