= The Love Boats =

Novel by Jeraldine Saunders

- Author: Jeraldine Saunders
- Language: English
- Published: September 1974 (Pinnacle Books)

The Love Boats is a 1974 autobiography by American writer Jeraldine Saunders based on her experiences working as a cruise hostess. The book served as the inspiration of The Love Boat.

== Publication history ==
Pinnacle Books slated the autobiography's release for September 1973, but the release was delayed until September 1974, when it was published by Pinnacle's imprint Drake Books.

The first paperback edition was published in August 1975. A second printing was released in September 1976, with the cover advertising the book as, "the naughty but funny novel that has now become the star-studded ABC-TV Special!"

In 1998, the book was reprinted by Llewellyn Publishing, being retitled The Love Boats: Above and Below Decks with Jeraldine Saunders, and was toted as The Real Life Story of the Creator of "The Love Boat". The book was expanded upon with more stories from Saunders' career as a cruise ship director.

== Reception ==
Irving Shulman called The Love Boats "as much fun as a trip around the world". Similarly, The Los Angeles Times said it was full of "exotic ports, erotic games on a sea of sun, sex, and booze!" The Desert Sun called it "the book to read."

== Adaptation ==
The Love Boats inspired the American romantic comedy-drama television series The Love Boat.

In September 1974, it was reported that Universal Pictures had purchased the film rights to the novel. In May 1976, it was announced that ABC would adapt the book into a two hour long TV movie. The film was shot aboard Princess Cruises' Sun Princess during a four-day cruise to Ensenada, Baja California. Prior to the release, it was decided to treat the film as a pilot, and ABC ordered a second pilot to be shot. The film premiered on Friday, September 17, 1976, and was well received.

The second pilot film, entitled Love Boat II, was filmed during a December 1976, 10-day cruise to Puerto Vallarta and Acapulco. It premiered on Friday, January 21, 1977.
