= List of programs broadcast by The Pet Network =

This is a list of television programs broadcast by the Canadian television channel The Pet Network.

== Final programming ==
=== 0–9 ===
- 100 Deeds for Eddie McDowd

=== A–E ===
- The Adventures of Black Stallion
- Amazing Tales
- Animal Airport
- Animal Allies
- Animal Crackers
- Animal Doctor
- Animal House
- Animal Magnetism
- Animal Miracles
- Animal Movie Magic
- Animal Rescue
- Animal SOS
- Animalia
- Bark Off!
- Baman Piderman
- Dogs

=== F–J ===
- Good Dog
- Harry's Mad
- Here's Boomer

=== K–O ===
- The Life and Times of Grizzly Adams
- Life with Pets
- Mickey's Farm, a.k.a. Mickey: Everyone's Best Friend
- The Mighty Jungle
- Ned's Newt
- Noah's Ark

=== P–T ===
- Patrol 03
- Pet Central
- Pet Cinema - various movies
- Pet Docs - various documentaries
- Pet Fashion
- Pet Friends
- Pets and People
- Riding High
- Twits & Pishers

=== U–Z ===
- Vets in Hong Kong
- Vets on the Wildside
- Wild Thing!
- Woof!
- Working Animals
- World's Greatest Pets

== Original programming ==
=== A–E ===
- Barking!
- Barking Mad
- Battersea Dogs' Home
- Dog-pound Shuffle

=== F–J ===
- Gentle Doctor
- Hollywood Pets
- International Animal Emergency

=== K–O ===
- Lassie
- My Magic Dog

=== P–T ===
- Pet Project
- Psycho Kitty
- The Right Companion
- Sunny's Ears

=== U–Z ===
- The Vet
