= Hyks =

Hyks or Hykš is a surname. Notable people with the surname include:

- Bohuslav Hykš (1889-?), Czech tennis player
- Veronika Hyks (born 1951), English voice over actress and narrator
