= WTV =

WTV may refer to:

== Television ==
- WTV, a regional television channel in West-Flanders, Belgium, see the list of television stations in Belgium
- West TV, a free-to-air community television station based in Perth, Australia
- W Network, a Canadian cable channel aimed at women
- W Channel (Australia), an Australian television network originally focussed on female-oriented programming, now a drama channel
- World Television, a virtual communication agency
- Wakayama Telecasting Corporation, a television station in Wakayama Prefecture, Japan

== Other uses ==
- WTV (Windows Recorded TV Show), a Windows video file format
