= Animal Airport =

British television series

Production
- Production company: World Television

Original release
- Network: Channel 5

Animal Airport is a British reality television series following the staff at London Heathrow Airport's Animal Reception Centre, known as the HARC. The centre acts as the Live Animal Border Inspection Post for Heathrow and handles animals destined for export, import and transit through the airport.

== Primise ==
The show follows the handlers and veterinarians of the HARC as they deal with the husbandry and transport of typical family pets such as cats and dogs, as well as more exotic animals such as a cassowary, and a shipment of live bumblebees.

== Broadcast ==
The show was made by World Television for Channel 5. The eight-part, 24-minute series first aired on Channel 5 on 22 May 2000. It was repeated on Sky Travel. Animal Airport was one of the first shows to be filmed at London Heathrow Airport.

== 2012 return ==
A second series was made by Icon Films and broadcast on Animal Planet on 13 June 2012. The series also aired on Seven Network in Australia and on Veronica TV in the Netherlands.

== Similar programs ==
- Airport (United Kingdom)
- Airline (United Kingdom / USA)
