= Airport 24/7: Miami =

- Genre: Reality
- Created by: Gold Star Television
- Country of origin: United States
- Original language: English
- No. of seasons: 3
- No. of episodes: 25

Production
- Executive producers: Bill Howard; Carla Kaufman Sloan; Chris Sloan; Shari Solomon Cedar
- Producer: Dawn Wilson
- Running time: 21–24 minutes
- Production companies: 2C Media; Acorn Media; One Light Road

Original release
- Network: Travel Channel
- Release: October 2, 2012 – September 17, 2013

Related
- Airline; On the Fly; Ready for Takeoff

Airport 24/7: Miami is an American reality television series on the Travel Channel. The series debuted on October 2, 2012. In January 2013, Travel Channel renewed the series for a second season that premiered on April 30, 2013. Travel Channel later green-lit a 6-episode third season.

== Premise ==
Airport 24/7: Miami follows the day-to-day life at Miami International Airport along with the airport's security, border protection and first-responder operations.

== Cast ==
- Albert Cordeschi — Triangle Services Ramp Duty Manager
- Chris "Stretch" Rutledge — Motorcycle Officer for Miami-Dade Police Department
- Darius Bradshaw — Terminal Operations Control Room Agent
- Dickie Davis — Director of Terminal Operations
- Ericka Curtis — Terminal Security Agent
- Heidi Anthony — Terminal Operations Senior Agent
- Ken Pyatt — Deputy Director for Operations
- Lauren Stover — Director of Security
- Tony Cooper — Terminal Operations Senior Agent

== Episodes ==
Season	Episodes	Originally released	
Season	Episodes	First released	Last released
1	6	October 2, 2012	October 30, 2012
2	13	April 30, 2013	August 6, 2013
3	6	August 13, 2013	September 17, 2013

=== Season 1 (2012) ===
No. overall	No. in season	Title	Original release date
1	1	"The Passenger"	October 2, 2012
2	2	"Upside of Danger"	October 2, 2012
3	3	"Category X"	October 9, 2012
4	4	"Catch a Thief"	October 16, 2012
5	5	"Air Force One"	October 23, 2012
6	6	"Fuel Fire"	October 30, 2012

=== Season 2 (2013) ===
No. overall	No. in season	Title	Original release date
7	1	"Fight or Flight"	April 30, 2013
8	2	"Signs of Danger"	April 30, 2013
9	3	"Bomb Threat"	May 7, 2013
10	4	"Speed!"	May 14, 2013
11	5	"Caught on Camera"	May 21, 2013
12	6	"Hell or High Water"	May 28, 2013
13	7	"Homeland Security"	June 4, 2013
14	8	"Ticking Bag Plot"	June 18, 2013
15	9	"Runway Dog"	June 25, 2013
16	10	"Million Dollar Stash"	July 2, 2013
17	11	"Cavity Search"	July 9, 2013
18	12	"Full Moon"	July 23, 2013
19	13	"Guns and Money"	August 6, 2013

=== Season 3 (2013) ===
No. overall	No. in season	Title	Original release date
20	1	"Sharks on a Plane"	August 13, 2013
21	2	"Storm Season"	August 20, 2013
22	3	"Dogs, Guns and Gold"	August 27, 2013
23	4	"What Not to Say at MIA"	September 3, 2013
24	5	"Blast Radius"	September 10, 2013
25	6	"Bird, Plane, Impact!"	September 17, 2013
