= List of Mickey's Farm episodes =

This is a list of episodes from Mickey's Farm which is a Canadian children's television series produced by Best Boy Entertainment in St. John's, Newfoundland and airs on The Pet Network in Canada and in the U.S. on the Trinity Broadcasting Network-owned Smile network, which picked up the U.S. rights to the show in 2012.

== Episodes ==
=== Season 1 (2009) ===
No. overall	No. in season	Title	Original release date
1	1A	"Leaves"	October 3, 2009
As it gets colder and the leaves change color, Mickey worries that he might change color, too, but Megan, Robin the Robin, Billy the Bear and Mabel the Maple Tree teach Mickey about the changing of the seasons by saying that the robin migrates in the winter, the brown bear hibernates in the cave, and the leaves of the maple tree turn orange, red, yellow and brown in the fall.
2	1B	"Pine Cones"	October 3, 2009
Mickey wants to help the trees when they start dropping little weird-shaped brown things on the ground, but Megan and Penelope the Pine Tree show Mickey what those brown things are and why it's important that trees drop them.
3	2A	"Wagon"	October 4, 2009
Mickey wants to go for a wagon ride, but despite all his urging, the horse won't pull the wagon, so Megan and Howie the Horse teach Mickey the magic words to get a horse to move and stop.
4	2B	"Tractor"	October 4, 2009
Mickey sees a fantastic machine that reminds him of a car and wants to go for ride, but he doesn't understand why the farmer won't take him for one, so Megan and Timmy the Tractor show Mickey what a tractor does and why he shouldn't ride on it.
5	3A	"Plow"	October 10, 2009
Mickey is very alarmed when he sees the farmer riding a machine with big claws that seems to be tearing up the land, so Megan and Pauly the Plow explain what the machine is doing and why.
6	3B	"Digging"	October 10, 2009
Megan taught Mickey that digging holes isn't very nice, so he's alarmed when he sees the farmer doing just that! Mickey tries to fill them in, but he can't, so Megan and Florence the Flower show Mickey why the farmer was digging holes.
7	4A	"Frog"	October 11, 2009
Mickey investigates a strange noise, but accidentally knocks Megan's fresh laundry on the ground before he can solve the mystery. Then one of the shirts hops away, so Megan and Fred the Frog help Mickey solve the mystery.
8	4B	"Soccer"	October 11, 2009
Mickey has been taught that kicking is not very nice, so when he sees some kids kicking a ball, he tries to stop them, but Megan and Baxter the Ball show Mickey a game where kicking is okay.
9	5A	"Tomatoes"	October 17, 2009
Mickey accidentally knocks over a bunch of tomatoes and they all roll down a hill. He retrieves them all but one, so Megan and Greg the Groundhog help Mickey figure out what happened to the missing tomato.
10	5B	"Spider"	October 17, 2009
Fiona's having a party and Mickey wants to bring her a toy, but he accidentally ruins a spider's web while looking for his ball, so Megan introduces him to Sophie the Spider, who teaches him how spiders make their webs.
11	6A	"Ducks"	October 18, 2009
When Mickey tries to make friends with some funny-looking birds on the pond, they just run away from him, so Megan shows him what kind of birds they are. First, they meet Red the Rooster, Hazel the Hen and Deke the Duck, the latter of whom tells him the best way of making new friends.
12	6B	"Bull"	October 18, 2009
Megan's lost her hat and Mickey sets out to find it, which he does-- right on the horn of a bull! Megan and Bartholomew the Bull help Mickey figure out how the hat got there and how Mickey can get it back for Megan.
13	7A	"Cat"	October 24, 2009
Mickey investigates a sound coming from the barn. He discovers what he thinks is a city cat and chases it away from the farm. Megan and Kit the Barn Cat show Mickey how he and Kit have something in common. She tells the field mouse to leave the grains for the cows while she watches it from near the barn.
14	7B	"Chick"	October 24, 2009
Mickey plays with a new friend he thinks is a Meep, but Mickey didn't ask the Meep's mother if it was okay first. Megan introduces him to the mother and he learns from Miss Chicken what kind of animal the Meep really is. She reveals that Chip is the lost chick's name.
15	8A	"Weather Vane"	October 25, 2009
During a game of hide and seek, a funny-looking thing with an arrow that sits on top of the barn keeps pointing Mickey in the wrong direction. Megan and Wanda Wind help Mickey figure out how a weather vane works.
16	8B	"Bird Feeder"	October 25, 2009
Mickey sees a bunch of birds eating all of Megan's seeds from a funny box on a stick. He believes the seeds should be planted, not eaten and tries to protect them. Megan and Beatrice the Bluebird teach Mickey a new way to use seeds.
17	9A	"Rabbit"	October 31, 2009
Mickey plays a fun game with a rabbit, but he gets worried when the rabbit disappears. Megan and Rishi the Rabbit show Mickey exactly how he vanished.
18	9B	"Chicken"	October 31, 2009
Mickey sees a chicken up on top of the farmhouse, thinks it's stuck up there, and tries to get it down. Megan and Cheryl the Chicken show Mickey how the chicken got up there and why.
19	10A	"Market"	November 1, 2009
When Mickey comes across a huge load of vegetables on the side of the road, he worries that they must be lost and decides to bring them to the supermarket. Megan and Katrina the Carrot show him an even better place for the veggies.
20	10B	"Horse"	November 1, 2009
Mickey meets Megan's new horse and thinks the horse is way cooler than he is, so he decides he wants to be more like the horse. Megan and Harry the Horse show Mickey there are many ways to be cool.
21	11A	"Swimming"	November 7, 2009
Mickey sees his duck friends in the pond and wants to play with them, only to discover he's afraid of the water. Megan, Felicia the Fish and Doug the Dog show Mickey all the different animals that love to swim.
22	11B	"Recital"	November 7, 2009
When Mickey sits outside the window and sings along with a boy playing the piano inside, the boy shuts the window so Mickey can't hear him play. Megan and Penelope the Piano teach Mickey the importance of practice time.
23	12A	"Rain"	November 8, 2009
On a wet, rainy day, Mickey is thankful that his fur keeps him warm, but he's worried about the unprotected plants, so he sets out to keep them warm and dry. Megan, Fred the Flower and Ken the Cloud teach him about plants and how they love the water.
24	12B	"Pig"	November 8, 2009
Mickey is happy to share his chew toy with his new pig friend, but he's not so happy when the pig runs away with it. Megan introduces Mickey to Pete the Pig who shows Mickey what he was doing with the toy and why.
25	13A	"Milk"	November 14, 2009
Mickey finds a delicious bucket of fresh milk, but when a "great big beast" tries to take it from him, he sets out to rescue the milk. Megan and Chloe the Cow show Mickey that the "beast" just wanted to share the milk.
26	13B	"Litter"	November 14, 2009
Mickey comes across some garbage and determines to give the back yard a good cleaning, but does his job a little too well and cleans up everything, including Megan's toys and tools. Megan and Gary the Garbage Can show Mickey what belongs in the garbage and what doesn't.
27	14A	"Phone"	November 15, 2009
Mickey hears a mysterious ringing in the barn. Megan and Phoebe the Phone show Mickey that the ringing is from a phone.
28	14B	"Thunder"	November 15, 2009
Mickey hears a loud noise. Megan and Tessa the Storm Cloud show Mickey it is just thunder.

=== Season 2 (2010) ===
No. overall	No. in season	Title	Original release date
29	1A	"Maple Tree"	August 9, 2010
Mickey sees something sticky dripping down a tree's trunk and thinks the tree might be sick. Megan and Mabel the Maple Tree teach Mickey about sap and how it is used to make maple syrup.
30	1B	"Owl"	August 9, 2010
Mickey was kept awake all night by a strange sound and sets out to investigate where it was coming from. Megan and Otis the Owl teach Mickey that some animals stay up all night and sleep all day.
31	2A	"Honeybee"	August 10, 2010
Mickey thinks he sees a strange fly bothering all the flowers. Megan and Betty the Honeybee show Mickey how bees collect nectar for making honey.
32	2B	"Woodpecker"	August 10, 2010
Mickey sees a woodpecker and thinks the bird is poking all the trees, so he covers up a baby tree he and Megan recently planted. Megan and Wanda the Woodpecker show Mickey what was really going on.
33	3A	"Snowman"	August 11, 2010
Mickey discovers a snowman who he thinks stole Megan's mittens. Megan and Simon the Snowman explain how Simon got the mittens.
34	3B	"Beaver"	August 11, 2010
Mickey goes to play with his rubber duckie in the river and is surprised to see lots of trees in the water. Megan and Bruno the Beaver explain how the trees got in the water and why they are there.
35	4A	"Frozen Duck Pond"	August 12, 2010
Mickey goes to play with his duck friends, but he is surprised to see they're all gone and the pond is covered in ice. Megan and Danny the Duck assure Mickey that the ducks will be back when the winter is over.
36	4B	"Singing Robin"	August 12, 2010
Mickey tries to sing like a robin, but he isn't very successful. Megan and Reginald the Robin help Mickey understand that everybody has unique abilities which make them special.
37	5A	"Easter Egg Hunt"	August 13, 2010
While on an Easter egg hunt, Mickey makes a robin a little upset when he takes one her blue eggs. Megan and Rhonda the Robin teach Mickey about the difference between Easter eggs and robin eggs.
38	5B	"Snow Blower"	August 13, 2010
Mickey finds Megan's lost scarf, but he loses it again when he tries to stop a strange machine from "spitting" snow everywhere. Megan and Sylvia the Snow Blower teach Mickey why snow blowers are so helpful in the winter.
39	6A	"Magic Rabbit"	August 16, 2010
Mickey tries to pull a rabbit out of a hat and worries that he broke Megan's magic wand when the magic trick doesn't work. Megan and Ronnie the Rabbit teach Mickey that practice makes perfect and make a little magic of their own.
40	6B	"Puppy"	August 16, 2010
Mickey tries to play with a puppy and doesn't understand why the puppy only wants to make a big mess. Megan, Madeline the Mother Dog and her puppy Paddy show Mickey why puppies need to be taught how to play.
41	7A	"Moose"	August 17, 2010
Mickey sees some funny-looking branches moving through the forest and worries that the trees might leave the farm and take Megan's tree house. Megan and Milton the Moose teach Mickey all about antlers.
42	7B	"Cricket"	August 17, 2010
Mickey searches for a quiet place to take a nap, but he is disturbed by something making a very loud noise. Megan and Calvin the Cricket show Mickey how crickets like to hide in the grass and chirp.
43	8A	"Turtle"	August 18, 2010
Mickey finds Megan's bandana in the pond and lays it on a rock to dry off. He gets a little confused after the rock walks away with the bandana. Megan and Tanner the Turtle help Mickey clear up his confusion.
44	8B	"Turkey"	August 18, 2010
Mickey thinks he found a chicken to play dress-up with, but he doesn't understand why the chicken keeps laughing and doesn't seem to like his costumes. Megan and Tom the Turkey teach Mickey the difference between chickens and turkeys.
45	9A	"Letters to Santa Claus"	August 19, 2010
Mickey tries to deliver some letters to Santa Claus and becomes convinced the mailbox is broken. Megan, Melvin the Mailbox and Santa Claus himself teach Mickey how mailboxes are really used and how letters reach to him.
46	9B	"Stinky Skunk"	August 19, 2010
Mickey finds a strange animal eating all the vegetables in the vegetable garden and gets a stinky surprise when he tries to stop it. Megan and Selma the Skunk teach Mickey why skunks occasionally spray people and eat garbage all the time.
47	10A	"Snowshoe Hare"	August 20, 2010
Mickey plays a fun game of guess-the-snow-print and sees some strange, really big prints he mistakes for a giant's prints. Megan and Harmony the Snowshoe Hare show Mickey why the footprints of snow are so useful.
48	10B	"Anthill"	August 20, 2010
Mickey unwittingly gets too close to an anthill and experiences a troublesome tickling sensation. Megan and Allie the Ant show Mickey where the ants live and why they made him so ticklish.
49	11A	"Broken Eggshells"	August 23, 2010
Mickey goes searching for a friend to play with, finds a chick with some broken eggshells on its head and thinks he has to put the eggshells back together. Megan and Chelsea the Chicken teach Mickey about how eggs hatch.
50	11B	"Kite"	August 23, 2010
Mickey tries to fly Megan's kite on a calm day and doesn't understand why he can't get it to fly. Megan and Karrie the Kite show Mickey how it's always best to fly kites on windy days.
51	12A	"Brown Cow"	August 24, 2010
Mickey goes searching for the cow that makes chocolate milk and doesn't have much luck finding it. Megan and Carly the Brown Cow show Mickey where chocolate milk really comes from. She mixes the chocolate syrup with the milk for the purpose of making chocolate milk.
52	12B	"Clouds"	August 24, 2010
Mickey decides to spend the day chasing clouds and guessing what they look like, but he has a little trouble keeping up with them. Megan and Cleo the Cloud show Mickey how the clouds are able to move so fast.
53	13A	"Silo"	August 25, 2010
Mickey sees the farmer filling a strange building with grain and thinks the animals won't have anything left to eat, so he hides some grain in his wagon. Megan and Sedwig the Shovel teach Mickey about silos and how the farmer is busy preparing for winter.
54	13B	"Slithering Snake"	August 25, 2010
Mickey finds a snake and wonders how it moves around without any legs, so he decides to try to give it a tour of the farm in his red wagon. Megan and Syril the Snake show Mickey why snakes don't need legs to get around.

=== Season 3 (2010) ===
No. overall	No. in season	Title	Original release date
29	1A	"Firewood"	October 3, 2010
Excited about a camping trip with Megan, Mickey heads out to collect some sticks for the campfire but gets a little confused when the piles he makes continue to disappear. Megan and Beatrice the Blue Jay show Mickey how the sticks disappeared and how birds use them to makes nests.
30	1B	"Melting Snowman"	October 3, 2010
Mickey seeks out the snowman he and Megan built the day before but only finds the snowman's clothes and is convinced his frozen friend is lost. Megan and Sammy the Snowman explain to Mickey that when it gets warm outside a snowman melts.
31	2A	"Seal"	October 3, 2010
Mickey hears a barking animal on the beach and thinks it's a dog. Megan and Samuel the Seal show Mickey that dogs aren't the only animals who bark.
32	2B	"Mosquito"	October 3, 2010
Mickey tries to find the perfect spot to camp with his friends and thinks he finds a good spot next to the pond, but he realizes a mysterious buzzing noise would make it too hard to sleep. Megan and Molly the Mosquito show Mickey what's making all the noise.
33	3A	"Skiing"	October 3, 2010
Mickey heads to his favourite hill to go sliding but is concerned when he discovers what he believes to be Megan's sleigh in pieces. Megan and Steevski and Stuski the Skis explain that those pieces are skis and poles and Mickey learns about skiing.
34	3B	"Starfish"	October 3, 2010
Mickey goes to play with his rubber duckie in the river and is surprised to see lots of trees in the water. Megan and Bruno the Beaver explain how the trees got in the water and why they are there.
35	4A	"Frozen Duck Pond"	August 12, 2010
Mickey goes to play with his duck friends, but he is surprised to see they're all gone and the pond is covered in ice. Megan and Danny the Duck assure Mickey that the ducks will be back when the winter is over.
36	4B	"Singing Robin"	August 12, 2010
Mickey tries to sing like a robin, but he isn't very successful. Megan and Reginald the Robin help Mickey understand that everybody has unique abilities which make them special.
37	5A	"Easter Egg Hunt"	August 13, 2010
While on an Easter egg hunt, Mickey makes a robin a little upset when he takes one her blue eggs. Megan and Rhonda the Robin teach Mickey about the difference between Easter eggs and robin eggs.
38	5B	"Snow Blower"	August 13, 2010
Mickey finds Megan's lost scarf, but he loses it again when he tries to stop a strange machine from "spitting" snow everywhere. Megan and Sylvia the Snow Blower teach Mickey why snow blowers are so helpful in the winter.
39	6A	"Magic Rabbit"	August 16, 2010
Mickey tries to pull a rabbit out of a hat and worries that he broke Megan's magic wand when the magic trick doesn't work. Megan and Ronnie the Rabbit teach Mickey that practice makes perfect and make a little magic of their own.
40	6B	"Puppy"	August 16, 2010
Mickey tries to play with a puppy and doesn't understand why the puppy only wants to make a big mess. Megan, Madeline the Mother Dog and her puppy Paddy show Mickey why puppies need to be taught how to play.
41	7A	"Moose"	August 17, 2010
Mickey sees some funny-looking branches moving through the forest and worries that the trees might leave the farm and take Megan's tree house. Megan and Milton the Moose teach Mickey all about antlers.
42	7B	"Cricket"	August 17, 2010
Mickey searches for a quiet place to take a nap, but he is disturbed by something making a very loud noise. Megan and Calvin the Cricket show Mickey how crickets like to hide in the grass and chirp.
43	8A	"Turtle"	August 18, 2010
Mickey finds Megan's bandana in the pond and lays it on a rock to dry off. He gets a little confused after the rock walks away with the bandana. Megan and Tanner the Turtle help Mickey clear up his confusion.
44	8B	"Turkey"	August 18, 2010
Mickey thinks he found a chicken to play dress-up with, but he doesn't understand why the chicken keeps laughing and doesn't seem to like his costumes. Megan and Tom the Turkey teach Mickey the difference between chickens and turkeys.
45	9A	"Letters to Santa Claus"	August 19, 2010
Mickey tries to deliver some letters to Santa Claus and becomes convinced the mailbox is broken. Megan, Melvin the Mailbox and Santa Claus himself teach Mickey how mailboxes are really used and how letters reach to him.
46	9B	"Stinky Skunk"	August 19, 2010
Mickey finds a strange animal eating all the vegetables in the vegetable garden and gets a stinky surprise when he tries to stop it. Megan and Selma the Skunk teach Mickey why skunks occasionally spray people and eat garbage all the time.
47	10A	"Snowshoe Hare"	August 20, 2010
Mickey plays a fun game of guess-the-snow-print and sees some strange, really big prints he mistakes for a giant's prints. Megan and Harmony the Snowshoe Hare show Mickey why the footprints of snow are so useful.
48	10B	"Anthill"	August 20, 2010
Mickey unwittingly gets too close to an anthill and experiences a troublesome tickling sensation. Megan and Allie the Ant show Mickey where the ants live and why they made him so ticklish.
49	11A	"Broken Eggshells!"	August 23, 2010
Mickey goes searching for a friend to play with, finds a chick with some broken eggshells on its head and thinks he has to put the eggshells back together. Megan and Chelsea the Chicken teach Mickey about how eggs hatch.
50	11B	"Kite"	August 23, 2010
Mickey tries to fly Megan's kite on a calm day and doesn't understand why he can't get it to fly. Megan and Karrie the Kite show Mickey how it's always best to fly kites on windy days.
51	12A	"Brown Cow"	August 24, 2010
Mickey goes searching for the cow that makes chocolate milk and doesn't have much luck finding it. Megan and Carly the Brown Cow show Mickey where chocolate milk really comes from. She mixes the chocolate syrup with the milk for the purpose of making chocolate milk.
52	12B	"Clouds"	August 24, 2010
Mickey decides to spend the day chasing clouds and guessing what they look like, but he has a little trouble keeping up with them. Megan and Cleo the Cloud show Mickey how the clouds are able to move so fast.
53	13A	"Silo"	August 25, 2010
Mickey sees the farmer filling a strange building with grain and thinks the animals won't have anything left to eat, so he hides some grain in his wagon. Megan and Sedwig the Shovel teach Mickey about silos and how the farmer is busy preparing for winter.
54	13B	"Slithering Snake"	August 25, 2010
Mickey finds a snake and wonders how it moves around without any legs, so he decides to try to give it a tour of the farm in his red wagon. Megan and Syril the Snake show Mickey why snakes don't need legs to get around.
