= Flylo =

Flylo may refer to:

- A fictional airline in the TV show Come Fly With Me.
- American rapper Flying Lotus
