= Airline (1998 TV series) =

British television series

- Genre: Documentary
- Directed by: Richard Cowles
- Starring: Britannia Airways (1998); EasyJet (1999–2007)
- Narrated by: Charlie Higson (Series 1); Tony Robinson; (Series 2–3, 7–10); Veronika Hyks (Series 4–6)
- Opening theme: "Come Fly with Me" by Tina May
- Country of origin: United Kingdom
- Original language: English
- No. of series: 10
- No. of episodes: 124 + 1 special

Production
- Executive producer: Joe Houlihan
- Producer: Richard Cowles
- Running time: 22 minutes (approx.)
- Production companies: LWT; (now branded ITV Studios)

Original release
- Network: ITV
- Release: 6 March 1998 – 19 January 2007

Related
- Airline (US); Luton Airport; Airport; Ready for Takeoff

Airline is a British fly on the wall television programme produced by LWT that showcases the daily happenings of passengers, ground workers and flight crew of Britannia Airways (series 1) and later EasyJet (from series 2).

The show was broadcast between 6 March 1998 and 19 January 2007 on ITV, was often repeated on ITV2 and aired in syndication on Sky Mix (previously known as Sky Three, Pick TV and Pick), Sky Real Lives and, as of 4 February 2019, CBS Reality. The programme's success sparked a US version of the series, following American low-cost airline Southwest Airlines.

== Production ==
EasyJet were first approached about the possibility of filming during mid-1998, after the first series with Britannia Airways (filmed at Manchester Airport in 1997) was discontinued. The first series with EasyJet was broadcast in January 1999, and the programme continued with them until it was discontinued. In 2003, it was ITV's most popular factual programme. The programme has been sold to many countries worldwide, including New Zealand, Australia, and Japan.

Starting with the second series in 1999, the programme follows passengers and staff of EasyJet and Reed Aviation (the handling agents) including Manager: Graham Fraser; Check-in trouble-shooter: Jane Boulton; Check-in assistant: Katrina Leeder; Supervisors: Leo Jones, Brett Holland and Leanne Cheung, Dispatcher: Kevin Reardon; Captain: James McBride, Stewardess: Janey Stock and Stelios as well as many passengers. The series were originally set in Liverpool and Luton but later incorporated Belfast, Bristol and Newcastle airports. Airline was also occasionally filmed at Gatwick and Stansted airports. Tony Robinson and Veronika Hyks replaced Charlie Higson as voiceover.

The programme also follows some passengers and staff on interesting journeys and during important moments in their lives. Wedding proposals, marriages, illnesses, business trips, reunions and once-in-a-lifetime experiences have all been filmed, both happy and sad, and one 2001 episode featured exclusively on the consequences the September 11 attacks had on EasyJet's operations at Luton. The programme also aims to educate the airline's passengers concerning its rules and regulations—some of the highlighted issues relate to missed check-in, incorrect travel documentation, and the carriage of prohibited items.

== Regular contributors ==
=== Notable Britannia staff ===
- Supervisors: Pat Baines, Cathy Duffy
- Captains: Peter Klack, Tony Rex
- Flight Steward/Stewardesses: Brian John Aldridge (BJ)
- Trainees: Aaron Smith, Jason Ravengard

=== Notable EasyJet/Aviance staff ===
==== Staff overview ====
Administrative
Founder of Easyjet	Stelios Haji-Ioannou
Airport Terminal Staff
Managers
Managers	Luton
Managers	Alan Darbyshire (Series 5–6); Graham Fraser (Series 3–4); Leo Jones (Assistant Manager) (Series 7–10)
Managers	Bristol
Managers	Machell Riley
Supervisors
Supervisors	Luton
Supervisors	Brett Holland; Leo Jones (Series 6); Jane Boulton (Series 2–5)
Supervisors	Liverpool
Supervisors	Leanne Cheung; Sarah Tier
Supervisors	Bristol
Supervisors	Richard Oates; Debbie Hopkins; Gemma Napper; Jodie Jenks
Passenger Services Agent	Helen Skeggs (series 5); Leo Jones (Series 5)
Ticket/Check In Desk Agents	Anita; Katrina Leeder
Ground Staff
Dispatch	Darren Ramsey (Luton) (Series 2); Kevin Reardon (Liverpool) (Series 2–3); Jane Boulton (Luton) (Series 5–9)
Air crew
Pilots	Lance Jordan (Series 5); Paul Barnes (Series 4-); James McBride (Series 3-); Mike Jamieson (Series 5-); Tony Underwood (Series 5)
Cabin Crew	Bob Brain; Andy Swain; Darren Ramsey (Series 3); Janey Stock (Series 3–4)

==== Series list of EasyJet staff ====
Job Role	Name	
Throughout Series
Founder of Easyjet	Stelios Haji-Ioannou	
Series 2
Passenger Supervisor	Jane Boulton	
Check-in/Ticket Desk Assistants	Katrina Leeder	
Dispatcher	Kevin Reardon (Liverpool); Darren Ramsey (Luton)	
Series 3
Managers	Graham Fraser	
Passenger Supervisor	Jane Boulton	
Check-in/Ticket Desk Assistants	Katrina Leeder	
Dispatcher	Kevin Reardon (Liverpool)	
Cabin crew	Janey Stock; Darren Ramsey	
Pilots	James McBride; Lance Jordan	
Series 4
Managers	Graham Fraser	
Passenger Supervisor	Jane Boulton; Stephen Elwood	
Check-in/Ticket Desk Assistants	Katrina Leeder	
Cabin Crew	Janey Stock	
Pilots	James McBride; Georgie Hobbs; Paul Barnes episode 4	
Series 5
Managers	Alan Derbyshire; Jane Boulton (Jane moved to dispatch during this series)	
Passenger Supervisor	Leo Jones (Luton); Leanne Cheung (Liverpool); Janna Wyatt (Luton)	
Check-in/Ticket Desk Assistants	Permanent	Temporary
Check-in/Ticket Desk Assistants	Anita; Katrina Leeder	Several Trainees were seen taking the Check-in Assistant Course but only one was seen in the role for a short time
Pilots	James McBride; Mike Jamieson; Tony Underwood	
Series 6
Managers	Alan Derbyshire; Leo Jones (Luton Assistant Manager); Sarah Tier (Liverpool Shift Manager); Leanne Cheung (Liverpool Check in desk Manager)	
Dispatcher	Jane Boulton	
Series 7
Managers	Jane Boulton	
Supervisor	Leo Jones	
Series 8
Managers	Jane Boulton	
Supervisor	Leo Jones	
Series 9
Managers	Jane Boulton	
Cabin Crew	Pam Clarke	
Series 10
Supervisor	Leo Jones	
Cabin Crew	Bob Brain	

== Format ==
=== Opening titles ===
These titles have a sky background and feature a Britannia plane (series 1) or an EasyJet plane (series 2–4) before cutting to clips of the overall series. For series 5 and 6, these titles changed to using a lighter blue sky and switching to an all blue logo. For the next two series, the titles changed to using an orange sky and blue/orange logo. For the final two series, they were similar style to that used in series 5 and 6 but now with a reddish tint and features an airline in the logo.

=== Opening and ending sequences ===
- At the start of each series the narrator would show snippets of what was to come throughout the series. This would normally be announced with the phrase "Welcome onboard another series of Airline"
- At the beginning of each episode in every series, the narrator would give a quick preview of what would be shown.
  This would normally be announced with the phrases "Coming up/Tonight on Airline" or "Onboard Airline tonight".
- At the end of most episodes, the narrator would provide an epilogue of what eventually happened to some of the passengers, staff, or business decisions (e.g. new plane, stock price) involved in that particular episode.
- Series 1-4 did not show what was coming up in the next episode but did feature at the end of the programme, before the credits, information of what happened to the passengers featured.
- Starting in series 5, clips of what would feature in the next episode were shown during the first 10 seconds of the credits.
- At the end of each series, the narrator would look back and highlight some of the more important things shown such as gripping stories about various members of airline staff. This would take about a minute and feature the common phrase "The Summer/Winter season has come to an end".

== Airport changes ==
=== Luton Airport ===
Series 1 which followed Britannia Airways has a very short scene filmed at Luton Airport in the original arrivals area at the end of the final episode.

Series 2 & 3 were filmed mostly in Luton's 1985 terminal at check in zones B&C (international) with occasional filming in "zone A" ((domestic) which was an extension built onto the existing terminal) as well as occasionally in the departure lounge. Building works of the new terminal building can be seen during series 3 and in final episodes of this series the check in desks have been renumbered.

"Airline at Christmas" filmed in late 1999 was to feature the new terminal as it opened with its new check in areas, shops and cafes, the new terminal is connected to the old terminal by Zone A. This episode is the only one to feature all check in areas. By series 4 all operations have moved to the new building and in a couple of episodes, building works are seen going on to refurbish the old terminal into what was to become new duty-free shops as part of departures. The former "Zone A" check in desks have been removed and this space later becomes an arrivals waiting area occasionally seen during series 5–9.

From series 7 the upstairs departure gates (originally 21 & 22 (domestic) have been renumbered 12 & 13. By series 10 Luton has redeveloped its buildings again, departures has now moved upstairs in the new terminal.

The original departure lounge is still in use but at the end of a very long walkway. The former "zone A" link has been demolished and replaced by a new building for a bigger arrivals waiting area and the 1985 terminal is now arrivals.

– Area not used for Passenger operation at the time

	Series 2–3	Christmas 1999	Series 4–9	Series 10
International Terminal
Check-In (Zone A)	Check-in area near to the future check-in area			
Check-In (Zone B & C)	Original Check-in area with open planned concourse	Check-in area was used as access to departures up until 2005 when the new departures lounge opened, it featured shops and restaurants. After the new departure lounge opened, it became part of arrivals.		
Departures	Original Departure Lounge		Departure Lounge is accessed through former zone A, security replaced arrivals and departures took up the check in area.	
New Terminal
Check-In		New check-in area with the entrance's & Departures access at the west side of the building and the main check-in area to the east separated by 2 passages, a cafe and information desks.		
Departures				Above the New check-in area on the first floor

=== Liverpool Airport ===
Series two introduces Liverpool airport as small with everything on one storey. Opposite the entrance are sales/ticket desks to the right are check-in desks and then security and departures are at the end of the concourse.

Series two reveals the end check in desks have been removed and there is now an upstairs which provides access to the departure lounge which has also moved upstairs. The EasyJet sales desk is not seen until briefly in series 4 where staff are wearing orange uniforms.

From series 5 the sales desks is where most of the filming takes place, the staff are now mainly wearing Reed Aviation uniforms and the check in desks have been replaced with blue similar to what used to be at Luton. This continued into series six where the original entrance becomes covered over and during this series all business is moved into the new terminal and the airport becomes known as "Liverpool John Lennon" The official opening of this terminal is featured in the final episode of series 6.

== Transmissions ==
Series	Start date	End date	Episodes	Notes
1	6 March 1998	10 April 1998	6	Followed Britannia Airways. The series was filmed at Manchester Airport
2	12 January 1999	26 February 1999	8	This is the first series to feature EasyJet. All ground staff wear Reed Aviation uniforms; Red Jackets, a Dark blue shirt with pink petals and a black rimmed red hat with a Reed aviation badge. Or a white shirt and tie with Reed Aviation petals.
3	10 September 1999	10 December 1999	10	This is the last series that featured the old Luton terminal. First series featuring Luton and some Liverpool ground staff in orange satin shirts (with a blue jacket).
4	23 June 2000	22 September 2000	14	This is the first series that featured the new Luton terminal.
5	12 March 2001	28 May 2001	12	Leo Jones joins Easyjet late in the series. Check in assistant Katrina Leeder leaves Easyjet after 6 years. Leanne Chung and Sarah Tier now appear at Liverpool.
6	15 April 2002	15 October 2002	18	This is the last series that featured the old Liverpool terminal, the new terminal was featured during the last couple of episodes. It is also the last series of Reed Aviation.
7	27 May 2003	12 August 2003	12	This series followed the merging of EasyJet and Go Fly. Easyjet staff now have new uniforms and former Reed Aviation staff now wear Aviance uniforms. Stelios steps down as Easyjet chairman.
8	8 October 2004	24 December 2004	12	
9	30 September 2005	16 December 2005	12	Belfast Airport becomes a regular feature. Jane Boulton, who was featured since series 2, leaves the airline to work for Aer Lingus at Heathrow.
10	8 September 2006	19 January 2007	20	Currently the last aired series.

== Episode guide ==
=== Series 1 (1998) ===
No. overall	No. in series	Title	Original release date
1	1	TBA	6 March 1998
2	2	TBA	13 March 1998
3	3	TBA	20 March 1998
4	4	TBA	27 March 1998
5	5	TBA	3 April 1998
6	6	TBA	10 April 1998

=== Series 2 (1999) ===
No. overall	No. in series	Title	Original release date	UK viewers (millions)
7	1	TBA	12 January 1999	10.51
8	2	TBA	15 January 1999	11.53
9	3	TBA	22 January 1999	11.96
10	4	TBA	29 January 1999	10.96
11	5	TBA	5 February 1999	11.99
12	6	TBA	12 February 1999	11.35
13	7	TBA	19 February 1999	11.01
14	8	TBA	26 February 1999	11.17

=== Series 3 (1999) ===
No. overall	No. in series	Title	Original release date	UK viewers (millions)
15	1	TBA	10 September 1999	8.14
16	2	TBA	17 September 1999	9.24
17	3	TBA	1 October 1999	9.56
18	4	TBA	8 October 1999	6.80
19	5	TBA	15 October 1999	8.52
20	6	TBA	22 October 1999	8.66
21	7	TBA	29 October 1999	8.89
22	8	TBA	5 November 1999	9.03
23	9	TBA	20 November 1999	9.57
24	10	TBA	10 December 1999	7.80
25	11	TBA	17 December 1999	8.17
26	12	"Airline at Christmas"	27 December 1999	7.52

== Holiday Airline ==
- Series 1: 10x30' (2001) – First shown from 31 August 2001. Following Monarch Airlines.

== See also ==
- Airport (1996–2005, 2008)
- Animal Airport (2000)
- (London) Luton Airport (2005–08)
- Air Ways (Australia, 2009–2012)
- Come Fly with Me (2010–2011)
- Heathrow: Britain's Busiest Airport (2015–2022)
- EasyJet: Inside the Cockpit (2017, 2019)
