= Airways News =

American commercial aviation publication founded in 1994

Airways
- Cover of the 30th Anniversary issue (April 2024)
- Editor-in-Chief: Roberto Leiro
- Managing Editor: Simone Chellini
- Digital Editor: Helwing Villamizar
- Former editors: Enrique Perrella; John Wegg
- Categories: Commercial aviation
- Frequency: Monthly
- Publisher: Steve Cosgrove
- Founder: John Wegg
- Founded: 1994; 32 years ago
- First issue: April 1, 1994; 32 years ago
- Company: Airways Publishing, LLC.
- Country: United States
- Based in: Dallas, Texas
- Language: English
- Website: www.airwaysmag.com
- ISSN: 1074-4320

Airways is an American monthly magazine printed and also published digitally that focuses on commercial aviation. Based in Dallas, Texas, the publication is owned by Steve Cosgrove, with editorial offices in Britain, the United States and the Netherlands.

Established in 1994 by John Wegg and Jon Proctor, Airways is the oldest continuously published commercial aviation magazine in the United States.

The magazine has published more than 320 issues and is distributed through newsstands in North America and 35 nations worldwide, reaching subscribers in more than 60 countries.

== History ==
The website was formed as an alliance between Airways Magazine and the former Airchive.com. The rebranded website, launched in September 2014, combines both aviation industry publications' expertise, resources and staffing.

Airchive.com originated in 2003 as a historical photo database before evolving into an aviation news outlet with coverage updated daily. The site's aviation industry coverage and commentary have appeared regularly in Forbes, CNET, Business Insider and USA Today. It was founded by Chris Sloan, an aviation enthusiast and veteran reporter who also serves as president and founder of television production company, 2C Media, which produces TV shows and promos for national cable and broadcast networks.

Airways Magazine, launched in 1994, focuses on the aviation industry's operators, aircraft, technology, manufacturers, airports, destinations, people and airways.
