= Spake =

Spake is a surname. Notable people with the surname include:

- Jeremy Spake (born 1969), British television personality and presenter
- Shannon Spake (born 1976), American sports reporter
