= Chris Sloan =

- Born: Christopher M. Sloan; December 4, 1968 (age 57); Norman, Oklahoma
- Occupations: Founder, Chief Creative Officer, 2C / Founder, Editor-in-Chief, Airways News

Chris Sloan (born 1968) is an executive producer for television and Chief Creative Officer of 2C Media (2C), a Miami-based production company and agency he founded with wife Carla Kaufman Sloan in 2005.

He is also a journalist and the founder of commercial aviation news site, Airchive.com, which formed a strategic alliance with Airways Magazine and rebranded as Airways News in 2014 before ultimately becoming AirwaysMag.com in 2016.

== Early career ==
Chris Sloan began working in broadcasting at the age of 13, when he served as a freelance public access TV producer in Norman, Oklahoma. In 1985, he took his first paid job as a producer/editor for Jimmy Houston Productions on a national TV show for ESPN and now NBCSN. Sloan was the first “preditor” at NBC Television Network, which aired his promo for the “Laugh In” series’ 25th reunion during the Super Bowl in 1993.

Prior to launching 2C, Sloan held a number of executive creative, programming and production posts, including Creative Director for NBC Entertainment; VP of Reality Programming for USA Networks; VP Production for TLC Network; and editor at Limelight Video.

== Television production ==
Through 2C Media, Sloan and wife Carla have created and produced original television series and specials for WE tv, Travel Channel, National Geographic, Animal Planet and Great American Country, among others. Their most recent reality television series, "Dr. Miami," debuted on WE tv in March 2017. In October 2014, the Sloans' original series, “Growing Up Gator,” debuted on Great American Country (GAC). They also created and executive produced “Florida Untamed” for Nat Geo WILD, “Airport 24/7: Miami” for Travel Channel, “Swamp Wars” for Animal Planet and “Danger Coast” for CMT, among others. Additionally, Sloan and his 2C staff produce promos, branded content, integrations and ads for broadcast and cable networks.

== Aviation journalism ==
In 2003, Chris Sloan founded Airchive.com, which he began as an aviation webseum and filled with aviation history, memorabilia, timetables, statistics and photographs. Over the years, Sloan evolved his aviation website into a regularly updated news outlet with a full staff of reporters covering the commercial airlines industry from all over the world.

In early 2014, Sloan formed a strategic alliance for Airchive.com with Airways Magazine with an agreement that the two publications would share resources. Airchive.com later rebranded as Airways News, and Sloan hired veteran aviation journalist Benét Wilson as his co-editor-in-chief. Sloan hired Roberto Leiro as executive editor in 2015, and the publication ultimately relaunched as AirwaysMag.com in 2016, with Enrique Perrella as publisher and editor-in-chief, Sloan as managing editor and senior partner, and Leiro as assistant editor.

== Affiliations and recognition ==
As a producer, Chris Sloan has earned numerous Emmy Awards through 2C Media. His work in the production industry earned him a spot on StudioDaily's StudioDaily 50 list in 2018. Sloan is a member of the Miami-Dade Film Commission and a Promax executive member. He served on the Promax Board of Directors between 2015 and 2019.

Sloan is also a regular speaker and panelist who has appeared at TEDx, Promax and NATPE events, among others. His most recent appearance was a TEDx talk he delivered April 21, 2018 at TEDx YoungCirclePark called "From a Ripple to a Wave" about his hurricane relief efforts for Puerto Rico.

== Personal life ==
Sloan grew up in Norman, Oklahoma. His father was a political science professor with a specialty in anti-terrorism at the University of Oklahoma and was involved in Murrah Building Bombing Memorial. His mother was an actress and artist.

On April 13, 2014, Sloan's oldest son, Calder, was electrocuted by a faultily wired pool light in the family's swimming pool. To honor him and raise awareness for pool safety, Sloan founded The Calder Jacob Sloan Legacy Fund, which benefits Calder's school, Lehrman Community Day School. Additionally, an awareness campaign wrapped around Calder's hand-drawn artwork went viral in the weeks following his death, with celebrities, sports figures and other personalities worldwide sharing the image titled “Mr. Awesome.”

On December 14, 2014, Chris Sloan was recognized as one of WPLG Local 10 Miami's list of "most fascinating people in South Florida" for his efforts to change county guidelines that now prohibit the use of high-voltage lights and circuits in private pools.

In February 2016, comedian Tammy Pescatelli donated proceeds from her show at The Improv in Fort Lauderdale, Florida to the Calder Jacob Sloan Legacy Fund, which benefited the Lehrman School, where Calder and his brother, Caleb, both attended. The Sloans launched Caleb & Calder Sloan's Awesome Foundation in 2017 with a painting drive benefiting Centro Mater Child Care Services.

In September 2017, after Hurricane Maria made landfall in Puerto Rico, causing widespread damage, the Sloans and their nonprofit foundation took on another major social cause. Along with Lara Richardson of Discovery Communications, they co-founded Operation Puerto Rico Care-Lift. This hurricane relief effort continued in November and December 2017, when they partnered with WSVN 7 News, Miami Children's Museum, Spirit Airlines and others to launch a phase 2 campaign called Operation Puerto Rico Gift-Lift. Their mission was to collect and distribute toys for the children in Puerto Rico who had been affected by Hurricane Maria. The Miami Children's Museum hosted a special toy drive event on December 2, 2018, and Spirit Airlines donated three flights to get the toys to Aguadilla, Puerto Rico. On Sunday, December 10, Operation Puerto Rico Gift-Lift worked with numerous organizations to host a holiday party in Aguadilla featuring food, bounce houses and entertainment. During this celebration, for which people began lining up as early as 6 a.m., hundreds of donated gifts were presented to the local children. It is estimated that 5,000 people attended.

Since then, Caleb & Calder Sloan's Awesome Foundation has been active both locally and nationally with annual Give Back Days benefiting Miami's underprivileged children and an annual Caleb & Calder Sloan's 'House of Awesome' event bringing the creative industry together each year to support a different cause at the Promax conference. The Caleb & Calder Sloan's House of Awesome initiative was expanded in 2019, with an event at the annual Tegna Inc. Content Summit, during which volunteers packed 2,000 backpacks full of school supplies for underprivileged children with the Boys & Girls Clubs of Greater Houston. In 2019, the Sloans also launched an official website for Caleb & Calder Sloan's Awesome Foundation.

Sloan now lives with his wife and their son in Miami.
