= On the Fly (TV series) =

- Genre: Documentary
- Created by: Gold Star Television
- Starring: Southwest Airlines
- Country of origin: United States
- No. of seasons: 1
- No. of episodes: 13 (list of episodes)

Production
- Executive producers: Ginny Somma; Richard Vagg
- Running time: 20 to 23 minutes (excluding commercials)
- Production companies: One Light Road Prod; Acorn Media

Original release
- Network: TLC
- Release: May 24 – July 12, 2012

Related
- Airline (U.S.); Airport 24/7: Miami

On the Fly is an American reality documentary television series on TLC. The series profiles the operations of Southwest Airlines and how passengers behave and act in the airport which is very similar to A&E's series Airline, and premiered on May 24, 2012. The show takes place at several different airports in the continental United States. Some of the airports include Baltimore-Washington International Airport in Baltimore, Maryland, Chicago Midway in Chicago Illinois, Hobby Airport in Houston Texas, Louis Armstrong International Airport in New Orleans, Louisiana and Tampa International Airport in Tampa, Florida.

== Episodes ==
No.	Title	Original release date	U.S. viewers (millions)
1	"I Want To Leave This Place!"	May 24, 2012	0.81
2	"Delayed & Enraged"	May 24, 2012	0.73
3	"But I Have A Life!"	May 31, 2012	0.67
4	"I Give You A Disclaimer — I Curse!"	May 31, 2012	0.59
5	"Show Me What You Got"	June 7, 2012	0.66
6	"Stir That Pot"	June 7, 2012	0.58
7	"Mardi Gras Madness"	June 14, 2012	0.91
8	"Stay Classy Alabama"	June 14, 2012	0.80
9	"That Dog is Obnoxious"	June 21, 2012	0.83
10	"Frantic to Fly"	June 21, 2012	N/A
11	"Gave My Seat Away!"	June 28, 2012	0.84
12	"Wake Up Dude"	July 5, 2012	0.88
13	"On the Edge"	July 12, 2012	0.84
