= Ready for Takeoff =

- Title card for Ready for Takeoff
- Genre: Factual
- Country of origin: Australia
- Original language: English
- No. of seasons: 2
- No. of episodes: 11

Production
- Running time: 30 minutes (Season 1); 60 minutes (Season 2)
- Production company: FremantleMedia Australia

Original release
- Network: Nine Network
- Release: 30 October 2015 – 11 November 2016

Related
- Airport 24/7: Miami

Ready for Takeoff is an Australian observational and airline television series aired on the Nine Network on 30 October 2015. The series was renewed for a second season and premiered on 7 October 2016.

The series takes viewers behind the scenes of operations at Australian airline Qantas, who funded the production of the program.

== Series overview ==
Series	Episodes	Originally released	
Series	Episodes	First released	Last released
1	8	30 October 2015	23 December 2015
2	5	7 October 2016	11 November 2016

== Episodes ==
=== Season 1 (2015) ===
No.	Title	Original release date	Australian viewers
1	"Episode 1"	30 October 2015	459,000
2	"Episode 2"	6 November 2015	542,000
3	"Episode 3"	13 November 2015	536,000
4	"Episode 4"	20 November 2015	508,000
5	"Episode 5"	2 December 2015	702,000
6	"Episode 6"	9 December 2015	649,000
7	"Episode 7"	16 December 2015	573,000
8	"Episode 8"	23 December 2015	429,000

=== Season 2 (2016) ===
No.	Title	Original release date	Australian viewers
1	"Episode 1"	7 October 2016	404,000
2	"Episode 2"	14 October 2016	485,000
3	"Episode 3"	21 October 2016	423,000
4	"Episode 4"	28 October 2016	455,000
5	"Episode 5"	11 November 2016	414,000

== Broadcast ==
Internationally, the series airs in Ireland on TV3, debuting on 6 July 2016.

== See also ==
- Airways, a similar 2009 series behind the scenes of Tiger Airways Australia.
