= Come Fly with Me (2010 TV series) =

British comedy mockumentary television series

- Genre: Comedy; Mockumentary
- Created by: Matt Lucas; David Walliams
- Written by: Matt Lucas; David Walliams; Kevin Cecil; Andy Riley
- Directed by: Paul King
- Starring: Matt Lucas; David Walliams
- Narrated by: Lindsay Duncan
- Composer: David Arnold
- Country of origin: United Kingdom
- Original language: English
- No. of series: 1
- No. of episodes: 6

Production
- Executive producers: Mark Freeland; Geoff Posner
- Producer: Adam Tandy
- Editors: Ant Boys; Mark Everson
- Running time: 28 minutes
- Production companies: Little Britain Productions; BBC Productions

Original release
- Network: BBC One & BBC One HD
- Release: 25 December 2010 – 27 January 2011

Related
- Little Britain; Airport; Luton Airport; Airline

Come Fly with Me is a British mockumentary television comedy series created by and starring Matt Lucas and David Walliams. Narrated by Lindsay Duncan, the series launched on 25 December 2010 on BBC One. A spoof of British documentaries Airport and Airline, the series follows the activity at a major airport and three fictional airlines; British airline 'FlyLo' (a parody of low-cost budget airlines such as Ryanair or easyJet), Irish airline 'Our Lady Air' (a parody of Aer Lingus), and flag-carrying British airline 'Great British Air' (a parody of British Airways).

Lucas and Walliams portray many of the focal airline and airport staff, as well as some passengers, whose comments and experiences are featured in one or more of the series episodes in the style of a "fly on the wall documentary".

Following the publication of allegations of sexual misconduct against Walliams in 2026, it was pulled from BBC iPlayer.

== Production ==
In June 2010, it was announced that Little Britain stars Lucas and Walliams had reunited to star in a new comedy series set in an airport, a spoof of British documentaries Airport and Airline. Filming for Come Fly with Me began in early August, with the duo spending two weeks at Robin Hood Airport Doncaster Sheffield. A further three weeks were spent shooting at London Stansted Airport, with scenes also being filmed at Liverpool John Lennon Airport and Pinewood Studios. A "making of" documentary titled Come Fly on the Wall aired on BBC One on 8 February 2011. On 28 January 2011, BBC announced it had commissioned a second series. Two years later in early January 2013, Walliams confirmed that a second series would not air, after Lucas refused to make a second series and the show was cancelled indefinitely.

== Airlines ==
- FlyLo is a low-cost, no frills airline owned by Omar Baba. Providing service across Europe and selected destinations across the Atlantic and South East Asia, it uses many hidden charges and unorthodox schemes in order to cut costs. These include £1 flights to New York City with a £480 booking fee, upright flatbeds in economy class, and a very small hand baggage allowance. FlyLo also offers budget package holidays that do not go down very well with its passengers.
- Our Lady Air, "the Catholic airline", is an Irish low-cost airline, providing routes across Europe. It saves money by flying to airports further away from the actual city centre, such as landing a flight to Barcelona in Ireland, with an included c.2300km "short coach transfer".
- Great British Air (callsign: Swift bird) is a major British flag carrier airline, providing a high class service around the world from the United Kingdom. The airline is renowned for having the finest first-class service in the world, with champagne and chocolates on boarding, and well-cooked meals on long haul flights. On short-haul flights, both first and economy class passengers are given a small glass of fresh orange juice and a complimentary browse of The Daily Mail.
- France Airways is a French flag carrier airline (a parody of Air France) that operates flights from the airport to France. It makes a brief appearance in Episode 5 when two members of the "British Medieval Battle Re-enactment Society" (played by Lucas and Walliams) argue with check-in staff after being refused permission to bring medieval weapons, including broadswords, maces, and a battleaxe, onto the aircraft as hand luggage on a flight to re-enact the Battle of Agincourt.

== Characters ==
=== Main characters ===
- Omar Baba (Walliams) – The double-chinned, flamboyantly asinine Arab owner of low-cost airline FlyLo. Baba is a parody of the Greek-Cypriot "low-cost flying" entrepreneur Stelios Haji-Ioannou (the founder of easyJet).
- Precious Little (Lucas) – A Jamaican woman in her 50s who professes to be a devout Christian, she is the manager of the airport's coffee kiosk. Precious deliberately causes problems that force the closure of the kiosk, allowing her to take the day off. Her main catchphrase is shouting "Praise the Lord!"
- Moses Beacon (Walliams) – The gushing, effeminate executive passenger liaison officer for Great British Air. Moses also runs a charity called WishWings which supposedly funds holidays for sick children, but usually involves Moses simply using the money to enjoy the local gay nightlife, leaving the child in the hotel or even at home. His catchphrase is "if you'll pardon the pun" when he seems not to have made a pun.
- Ian Foot (Walliams) – The pompous, racist, and bigoted chief immigration officer who often comes up with ridiculous reasons not to allow a foreign person into the country, which includes people such as the Polish ambassador to the United Kingdom. Ironically, he is initially shown to be allowing an elderly man into the UK on a little girl's passport that has clearly been stolen, thus illustrating his hypocritical incompetence.
- Tommy Reid (Lucas) – A young, obtuse Scottish man working at Happy Burger, one of the airport's fast-food eateries. He hopes to work his way up to becoming a pilot, unaware that the two jobs are completely unrelated. His dream would later amount to nil after an interview at a flying school, in which he reveals he has no qualifications, no hobbies whatsoever, and can't read.
- Taaj Manzoor (Lucas) – Taaj is a young British-Pakistani man who works as part of the roving ground crew for FlyLo. He sports a shaved head and a chin curtain beard, and is something of a film buff.
- Melody Baines (Walliams) and Keeley St Clair (Lucas) – Two snarky check-in girls for FlyLo who hail from Liverpool. Later on in the series, the girls fight for the position of check-in manager and it is later revealed that Keeley got the job, only to lose it when Omar replaces his whole staff with children to cut costs.
- Mickey Minchin (Lucas) and Buster Bell (Walliams) – Two shady paparazzi who haunt the airport's hallways, constantly messing up in their photo-shooting activities.
- Fearghal O'Farrell (Lucas) – A gay steward for Irish airline Our Lady Air, who leads a destructive campaign in order to become Employee of the Year.
- Ben Roberts (Walliams) and James Stewart (Lucas) – Two British airport customs officers, with rather extreme methods of cataloguing the illegal substances they find, such as sampling drugs.
- Simon (Lucas) and Jackie Trent (Walliams) – A husband and wife pilot team, flying for Great British Air. Jackie constantly brings up the fact that Simon committed adultery with a stewardess, which is the reason they now fly together as Jackie does not trust him to work alone.
- Peter (Lucas) and Judith Surname (Walliams) – Married holidaymakers who have suffered several horrific and surreal trips abroad after buying destination packages from FlyLo, dubbing them "The holiday from Hell". Peter is forced to take a subordinate stance to Judith's overbearing, bossy personality and is usually silenced by her. They have had many unfortunate events on their travels, such as a cruise where they contract a disease and then have pirates attack the ship, surviving a plane crash in Peru and having to eat Peter's leg to survive, a holiday to Cyprus to a hotel that hasn't been built yet, and visiting a small African island where they are kidnapped by a local tribe. Despite the traumatic nature of these experiences, they usually relate the stories in a calm, deadpan tone, as if they were a collection of minor inconveniences. In the final episode, Peter leaves Judith and returns to his last destination, where he was hypnotised into having sex with an entire tribe of women.
- Penny Carter (Walliams) – A very elitist first-class stewardess for Great British Air's long haul flights who despises people who have first class tickets but are not upper-class.
- John (Lucas) and Terry (Walliams) – Father-and-son baggage handlers who steal from passengers' luggage and are generally less than careful with it. Their names are a reference to controversial footballer John Terry.
- Helen Baker (Sally Rogers) – The check-in staff manager for FlyLo who later goes on maternity leave.
- Lisa (Pippa Bennett-Warner) – Check-in staff for FlyLo. She receives several complaints from regular FlyLo passengers, Peter and Judith.

=== Additional characters ===
- Hetty Wolf (Lucas) – A 92-year-old German passenger who pretends to be on her first flight, scamming Moses Beacon into buying her a number of luxury products, including an Yves Saint Laurent scarf and an iPad, and getting her a seat in first class, before revealing she has flown many times before. (Appears in: Episode 1)
- Sue (Lucas) and Geoff Stott (Walliams) – A couple who are flying to Disneyland to get married. (Appear in: Episode 1)
- Asuka and Nanako (Walliams & Lucas) – Two Japanese girls who have flown to the airport to see their idol, Martin Clunes. (Appear in: Episode 1)
- Geri Halliwell (herself) – whose photo resident paparazzi Mickey and Buster are waiting to take as she disembarks a plane, only to miss the shot as they're too busy comparing the virtues of each of the Spice Girls to camera. (Appears in: Episode 1)
- Mrs. Mbutu (Ellen Thomas) – Liberian passenger whom Ian accuses of making up her country. (Appears in: Episode 2)
- Ashley (Walliams) – The supervisor who is there to help Tommy serve his first customer at Happy Burger.
- Lee Lodge (Walliams) – Trainee steward for Our Lady Air. He has a girlfriend and is heterosexual, but has homosexual intercourse with Fearghal whilst drunk, in a hotel in Dublin. (Appears in: Episode 2)
- Captain Stirrick (Ted Robbins) – A drunk airline pilot who causes a commotion. (Appears in: Episode 2)
- David Schwimmer (himself) – Stopped by customs whilst trying to smuggle transsexual porn DVDs into the UK, which he blames on his Friends co-stars Matt LeBlanc and Jennifer Aniston. (Appears in: Episode 2)
- Mr Akhmed (Stewart Scudamore) – A Muslim passenger that orders the halal meal option on the flight to Rome, but instead was given the kosher meal (intended for a Jewish passenger) by Fearghal, who insists "It's all the same isn't it?". (Appears in: Episode 3).
- Trainee (Joe Cole) – Taking a customer's order under the supervision of Tommy Reid at Happy Burger (Appears in: Episode 3)
- Rupert Grint (himself) – Taaj gives Rupert his script for Future Cop 2000 when meeting him whilst he disembarked the plane from Los Angeles. Taaj asks Grint to pass it on to Daniel Radcliffe. (Appears in: Episode 3).
- The Woods Family – A family who turn up for their flight a week early. They stay at the airport for a week and find activities to fill the time, then end up missing their flight. (Appears in: Episode 4)
- Kenneth (Lucas) – A border-patrol worker who instantly recognises Ian Foot in disguise. (Appears in: Episode 4)
- Barbara Windsor (herself) – Moses is asked to escort Barbara to her departure gate, but actually wants her to help him get a knighthood or an OBE. In the guise of an autograph, he even gives her an insulting letter to sign addressed to the Queen. Windsor is offended after reading the letter and she tells Moses to "piss off." (Appears in: Episode 4)
- Steve Downes (Lucas) – A police dog handler whose previous canine companions have mostly ended up in rehab. His current drug sniffer dog is called Bobo. (Appears in: Episode 5)
- George Spires (Lucas) – A Welsh toilet cleaner who is a fan of opera singing and sings to the people who come in. (Appears in: Episode 5)
- Colin (Walliams) and Gavin (Lucas) – Battle re-enactors who are not allowed to take swords to a re-enactment of the Battle of Agincourt; Colin later says he has killed only three people in the trade. (Appear in: Episode 5)
- 'Mr Nuts' (Alex MacQueen) – A passenger of Our Lady Air who suffers from a nut allergy. Fearghal appears to save him from dying, but Fearghal had actually induced the reaction himself by discreetly dropping a handful of hot nuts into his mouth on his way past in order to appear heroic, boosting his chances to receive the Steward of the Year award. (Appear in: Episode 5)
- Corinne Oliver (Walliams) – The airport's officer of special needs. She is disabled herself and is pushed around by her helper, Bob (Lucas). (Appears in: Episode 6)
- Flying School Instructor (Walliams) – Employee for the BAC who interviews Tommy Reid for the chance to become a pilot. (Appears in: Episode 6)
- Ray (Walliams) and Anne Wilkins (Lucas) – Owners of the airport pub. They are known to chase departing customers through the airport in a bid for someone to stay "more than twelve minutes". (Appear in: Episode 6)
- Mary O'Mara (Aisling Bea) – Air stewardess for Irish airline Our Lady Air, who wins the Steward of the Year title in a draw with Fearghal O'Farrell. (Appears in: Episode 6)
- Dale Winton (himself) – The host of Our Lady Air's annual Steward of the Year competition. (Appears in: Episode 6)
- Mr Dubrowski (Valentine Pelka) – The Polish Ambassador to the United Kingdom, whom Ian Foot accuses of working illegally in the United Kingdom because he is Polish.

== Episodes ==
Come Fly with Me began airing on Christmas Day 2010 to mixed reviews from critics, and gained more than 12.47 million viewers. The second episode, which aired on New Year's Day 2011, gained more than 8.80 million viewers, while the remaining four episodes averaged around 7 million viewers throughout the rest of the series. The series began airing in the United States on BBC America on 18 June 2011, edited to fit a 30-minute time slot with commercials.

No.	Title	Directed by	Original release date	Prod. code	UK viewers (millions)
1	"Episode 1"	Paul King	25 December 2010	101	12.47
Omar Baba responds to criticism of FlyLo's safety practices while husband-and-wife pilots Simon and Jackie argue about flying together, and Simon's affair. Moses Beacon is tasked with explaining to a first-class passenger, Miss Ross, that her dog has died in-flight after a heating malfunction in the cargo hold caused it to freeze to death, and later finds himself charged with escorting Hetty Wolf, a 92-year-old German woman who claims she has never flown before. She scams Moses into buying her many luxury items that she says are presents for her grandson in Florida, whom she is going to visit, as well as upgrading her seat to first class. Just as she is boarding the plane, Hetty reveals to Moses that she has actually flown many times, angering Moses. A man that does not work at the airport is caught 'patting down' the passengers. Ian Foot investigates a case of an elderly gentleman attempting to enter the country using the passport of a 12-year-old girl. Taaj Manzoor describes his duties on an airport buggy, which he sees as a chick magnet. Melody and Keeley learn that there may be a supervisor's opening. Mickey and Buster attempt to get a photograph of Geri Halliwell but miss her after doing a rendition of Spice Girls songs. Fearghal assists a young mother by putting her three-month old baby in the overhead locker. Precious Little closes The Coffee Hut early after claiming it has run out of coffee, then does her shopping at the airport. Sue and Geoff Stott check in for their flight to Disneyland California, and Sue talks about her love for Disney. Asuka and Nanako try to catch a glimpse of Martin Clunes returning, but he finds out they are waiting for him, and has the plane diverted to RAF Northolt.
2	"Episode 2"	Paul King	1 January 2011	102	8.80
Omar Baba reveals Flylo's latest schemes: flights to New York for £1 with a big catch, and upright "flat" beds in coach. Moses Beacon attempts to help a nervous passenger, but only worries her more by telling her statistics about plane accidents. Ian Foot detains a woman with a "suspicious" passport, believing Liberia is not an actual country. Taaj Manzoor must diplomatically tell passengers that their flight is delayed when a wing falls off the plane. Melody must enforce FlyLo's new baggage allowances and Keeley acquaints a passenger with the company website. Mickey and Buster receive a tip-off that Queen Elizabeth II is at the airport. Fearghal works with trainee steward Lee Lodge. Tommy has ambitions to be a pilot, and tries to work his way up from the airport burger bar. Precious Little closes her stall early claiming that there are no paper cups, and spends the day playing the fruit machines with petty cash. Peter and Judith describe their FlyLo Holidays 'cruise from hell'. First Officer Jackie flirts with a member of air-traffic control, annoying Simon. Captain Stirrick is arrested for being drunk. Ben and James detain David Schwimmer for bringing illegal transsexual pornographic DVDs into the United Kingdom, which he claims are for his Friends co-star Matt LeBlanc.
3	"Episode 3"	Paul King	6 January 2011	103	7.81
Melody deals with a lady whose son is more than 24 months old and argues with her about purchasing a ticket for him. Omar Baba creates a new FlyLo advert featuring dwarves following reports regarding a lack of legroom. FlyLo's ground crew member, Taaj Manzoor, shares his favourite films, which include Avatar and its sequels. Ian Foot interviews a French gentleman from Paris who speaks fluent English and inquires about his passport photo. Ian doodles a moustache on him and detains him as it grows. Pilots Simon and Jackie are scheduled for different flights, resulting in Jackie's mother accompanying Simon on his flight to Las Vegas. John and Terry explain their approach to baggage handling. Meanwhile, Precious has acquired long fake orange plastic nails from Terminal 2 that are far too long for her, preventing her from grasping anything, which forces her to close the coffee shop early. She later uses a wheelchair while having her toes done. We also meet Penny, Great British Air's most snobbish stewardess. On the flight to New York, she attempts to eject some passengers whom she considers unworthy of the First-Class cabin. The police removed them from the plane. Tommy trains a new trainee on how to serve customers, with the assistance of his supervisor. Melody and Kelly dislike their manager, Helen. Fearghal distributes meals on a flight to Rome. Ian road tests his new board game 'Keep Em Out'. Customs Officers Roberts and Stewart attempt to determine what to do with a truly massive drug haul. They sample the substance to ascertain its nature, and deduce that some is cocaine and heroin. Moses tells us about his charity WishWings, but then jets off to Mykonos, stating that he will call the ill child when he is there. Robert and Stewart still consume the drugs. Taaj Manzoor bumps into Harry Potter actor Rupert Grint and tries to show him his film script, Future Cop 2000. Peter and Judith recall another of their 'holidays from hell' that involved no hotel accommodations and Peter experiencing an upset stomach. Precious takes the wheelchair when she has her toes done. Robert and Stewart dance in a drug-fuelled manner and let the passenger leave. In the end, the police took the first-class couple to Guantanamo Bay for questioning. The man detained in immigration grew a moustache, but Ian denied him entry since he was French.
4	"Episode 4"	Paul King	13 January 2011	104	7.43
Melody and Keeley manage a large man and end up giving him two separate seats on the plane. Omar Baba goes green by planting a single tree on a roundabout, but insults Daybreak in the process. Fearghal showcases the new celebrity perfumes, e.g. perfumes from Sarah Ferguson, Ashley Cole, Gavin Henson, Mel Gibson. He also takes out a napkin with "business class" when he deals with a business class passenger. Fearghal additionally fills in questionnaires about his service. Moses faces a challenge with a Chinese man, then puts a sign around his neck and sends him out. Tommy tries to ask Melody out on a date but ends up accidentally buying tickets to Prague. The stewardess, Sally Wicks, with whom Simon had an affair, acts as cabin crew on Jackie and Simon's latest flight. Ian Foot dresses up as the type of people who try to enter the country, including disguising himself as a South American man. His staff, Kenneth, identifies him immediately. Micky and Buster recall their interactions with celebrities, including Colonel Gaddafi, Robert Mugabe and Kim Jong-Un. The water in Precious' coffee stall has mysteriously been cut off, so she has to close the stall early, and decides to go and see Dirty Dancing with her sisters. However, the plumber then fixes the pipe, annoying Precious. The Woods family have their flight booked for next week instead of when they thought. So they will stay at the airport for that time. Penny is delighted when she finds out that Princess Anne will be travelling with Great British Air, but is not so delighted when she meets up with a representative of the Royal Family to discuss her requirements. John and Terry break open a Louis Vuitton suitcase and steal various items, like a laptop, shoes, an iPod, and Chanel perfume. Baba also shows us inside the new FlyLo 'Loveatory'. Peter and Judith's next 'Holiday from Hell' ended with Peter facing a twelve-year minimum prison sentence after smuggling 20kg of cocaine, with a street value of £500,000. Moses asks how Barbara Windsor got her MBE, and says that she does a lot for charity and tries to have him knighted. She tries to get her signature, but finds out that the signature is for a letter to the Queen. She insults Moses. Anne's representative says that she will request that Penny not be on Anne's flight. In the end, the Wood family missed their flight and still live in the terminal. Mickey and Buster snapped Vladimir Putin playing frisbee with Abby Titmus. Ian Foot shows his various disguises, such as Australian, Rastafarian, Russian, Lady Gaga, and Scotsman.
5	"Episode 5"	Paul King	20 January 2011	107	7.11
Helen talks to Melody after she arrives 2 hours later to work. Taaj reveals to some disgruntled passengers that their plane departed to Athens an hour before. Mickey and Buster go their separate ways when Buster loses his photographic license after he upskirts Judi Dench. They separate, and Mickey calls his friend a "pervert". Fearghal feeds an allergic passenger nuts to allow him to administer a life-saving injection and appear a hero, in an attempt to win the title of Steward of the Year. A pregnant Helen says her farewell to Melody and Keeley, but they show no emotion or reaction. Police dog handler Steve Downes reveals the history of his previous dogs, which usually ended up with them going into rehab with drug addictions. Battle re-enactors Colin and Gavin are furious with Francoise, a check-in staff member, when they are not allowed to bring their swords to a reenactment of the Battle of Agincourt, but she denies them. baggage handler John believes he has psychic powers. Ian Foot, who has a signature from Jeremy Clarkson, does a spot check on Taaj Manzoor. Taaj tells about his Pakistani heritage, and how he likes BMX and mixed martial arts and likes Chinese food and is friends with Osama Bin Laden on Facebook. He adds his name to a list who threaten Britain's security, alongside Hardeep Singh Kohli, Mark Ramprakash and Konnie Huq. Omar Baba denies verbally sexually harassing Helen, Melody and Taaj, so he calls Keeley to come to the rescue. Peter and Judith talk about their most recent 'holiday from hell', which included being trapped in the Andes after their plane crashed and barbecuing Peter's leg. Moses meets Anna Friel, who came from Los Angeles, and reveals she is bald. George Spires sings opera to frightened users of the toilet. At a press conference, Baba flirts with female reporters, and Keeley defends him. While the reporters take their photos, Baba touches her boobs. Moses could not find her wig and is trying to find a replacement for it. Mickey and Buster make up again, and it is revealed that Keeley has been given the role of check-in manager. Melody is jealous of the fact that her friend is the manager. In the end, Colin and Gavin realised the futility of what they were doing, Steve tells that his dog has sniffed out a Jaffa cake and a book of Polo, and Moses finds the right wig for Anna.
6	"Episode 6"	Paul King	27 January 2011	106	7.22
Keeley helps purchase a ticket for Guernsey for a gentleman and informs that all flights to Guernsey have been suspended due to industrial action. Keeley is the only one who is left at the check-in desk, because she is now the check-in manager, and other FlyLo crew members are on strike. Baba is angry at the industrial action. Taaj handles angry passengers who were furious at the cancelled flights. On a Great British Air flight to Florida, Orlando, Penny settles in for a relaxing flight with no First-Class passengers, but to her irritation, she is made to work in economy and helps out the other passengers. Penny rubs a hot towel on a man's face and leaves it on his head. Tommy has an interview at the British Aviation Centre, and reveals to the interviewer that he has no qualifications and has a fear of flying. Ian Foot interviews (and insults) the Polish Ambassador for the United Kingdom, Mr Dubrowski. Dubrowski makes a complaint against Ian. In special services, wheelchair user Corinne Oliver looks after other wheelchair users and is pushed around by helper Bob. On the flight to Shannon, Fearghal is nominated for the Steward of the Year award, hosted by Dale Winton, and he is ecstatic. Penny gets more agitated at the economy passengers. Precious finally has all the supplies for the coffee hut, but closes early because there are no customers. Moses is collecting for charity, and shows us his charity video for "Flying Without Wings". John goes on strike, supporting his colleagues. Ray and Anne Wilkins, eager bar owners, say that they want to transform their pub and make people stay longer. Tommy gets rejected from the academy since he does not have the required qualifications. Moses collapses after blowing up a balloon. Judith and Peter have another 'Holiday from Hell', and are disgusted to find because of the FlyLo strike, nobody is manning the complaints desk, except Peter goes back to the island of Tobutu where they are kidnapped and practised Voodoo art and Peter impregnated all 17 virgin tribal girls. After the complaint, Ian gets suspended with pay. Ian says he will have soup and will call a British prostitute. Tommy resigns from Happy Burger, walking through the airport in just his underpants after handing the uniform back and tells of his new ambitions to become a spaceman. Moses reveals that he has to pump balloons with a pump. Taaj is running a rally with his colleagues, but Omar walks in on Taaj's rally. Omar motivates his staff after the strike, but whispers to his assistant to fire all his staff. At the awards ceremony, after winning in a tie, Fearghal gets kicked out of the ceremony and is subsequently fired from Our Lady Air. Ray and Anne chase after people after leaving the bar during their pub quiz. In the end, in special services, 6 of his staff were placed in a wheelchair. Peter goes on holiday to Tobutu alone, Omar replaces his staff with Vietnamese children, including on the check-in desk

== Come Fly on the Wall (2011) ==
Come Fly on the Wall discussed the making of Come Fly with Me with Walliams and Lucas. The programme featured clips from filming, outtakes and interviews with the show's creators as they developed the series. It featured pre production discussions and rehearsals, and showed the actors filming at some of the United Kingdom's busiest airports. It also showed Walliams and Lucas transforming into their new characters in the make up chair, and bringing them to life in front of the camera.

The programme was broadcast on BBC One on 8 February 2011.

== Cancellation ==
On 28 January 2011, the BBC announced that the show had been commissioned for a second series. The new series was set to air during early 2013. In January 2013, Walliams confirmed that a second series would not air, stating that Lucas did not wish to continue the show.

== Home media ==
DVD/Blu-ray Title	Discs	Year	Episodes	Release dates			
DVD/Blu-ray Title	Discs	Year	Episodes	Region 1	Region 2	Region 4	Blu-ray Region B
Complete Series 1	2	2010–11	6	13 March 2012	21 November 2011	24 November 2011	21 November 2011 (Region Free)

Digital Editions were released on Amazon Prime Video and iTunes / Apple TV.

== Web content ==
In conjunction with the television episodes, a selection of extra online content was published on the programme website. The extra content, featuring some of the main characters played by Matt Lucas and David Walliams, was presented as spoof versions of real life airline websites, for example an on line check in service for fictional airline FlyLo, with Melody and Keeley. The content was written by Kevin Cecil, who also contributed to the television scripts. Cecil was inspired by his own work on comedy tie-in books over the years.

== Reception ==
Come Fly with Me received mixed reviews, with the Daily Express calling it "the worst sketch show, or sitcom to have ever gone out on a Christmas Day" and expressed concern over its screening on the day, considering the perceived lack of quality. The Daily Mirror, however, claimed it was a resounding success and the claims of racism and lack of humour made by the Express were unfounded and hypocritical. The show was the most watched comedy of 2010, with ten million viewers, but also had thousands of viewer complaints, and criticism for perceived racist content. It was the third most-watched show on Christmas Day in the United Kingdom.

== Controversy ==
In June 2020, Come Fly with Me, alongside Little Britain, was removed from Netflix for its use of blackface, brownface and yellowface; six months prior it had also been removed from BritBox. It had not been available on iPlayer. A spokesperson for the BBC said: "There's a lot of historical programming available on BBC iPlayer, which we regularly review". On its decision to remove the shows, BritBox added: "Times have changed since Little Britain first aired, so it is not currently available on BritBox. Come Fly With Me has not been available on the service for six months".

== Ratings ==
Consolidated viewing figures
Episode	Viewers (millions)
1	12.47
2	8.80
3	7.81
4	7.43
5	7.11
6	7.22

== International versions ==
A Dutch version of the show was created, using an almost exact copy of the script and characters (translated to Dutch). It was broadcast on RTL 4 from August 2011.
