= Mickey's Farm =

Canadian children's television series

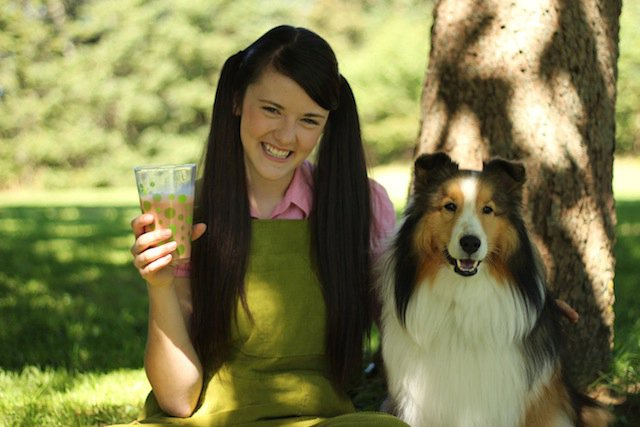
- Megan and Mickey the dog from "Mickey's Farm"
- Genre: Children's television series
- Created by: Best Boy Entertainment
- Directed by: Christian Sparkes (season 1); Allison White (season 2); Darcy Fitzpatrick (seasons 3-5)
- Starring: Peter MacDonald (Seasons 1-2); Jessica Croucher (Seasons 1-2) Katherine Hatcher (Season 1); Rhona Buchar (Season 1); Allison White (Seasons 2-5); Hannah Wadman-Scanlan (Seasons 2, 3-5); Erin Mackey (Seasons 3-5); Charles Tomlinson
- Theme music composer: Jeremy Rice
- Country of origin: Canada
- Original language: English
- No. of seasons: 5
- No. of episodes: 143 (list of episodes)

Production
- Executive producers: Les Harris (season 1); Ed Martin
- Producers: Ed Martin; Edward J. Martin
- Production locations: St. John's, Newfoundland
- Running time: 11 minutes
- Production company: Best Boy Entertainment

Original release
- Network: The Pet Network
- Release: October 3, 2009 – 2013

Mickey's Farm is a Canadian children's television series made for preschoolers and children, which is a mix of live action, animation and original music. The show is a remake of the animated made for television & film, and produced by Best Boy Entertainment in St. John's, Newfoundland. In Canada, it airs on The Pet Network. In the U.S., it broadcasts on the Qubo channel in 2014 until 2021 and the Trinity Broadcasting Network-owned Smile of a Child children's network (now known as Smile), which picked up the U.S. rights to the show in 2012 until the channel's closure in early 2025.

== Premise ==
Mickey, a new farm dog, has just moved from the city to the farm with his best friend, Megan. Each episode follows Mickey as he experiences new things on the farm and sometimes gets himself into troublesome situations. With the help of Megan, his friends Guy the Goat and Fiona the Ferret and their Magic Book, Mickey resolves his problems and learns something new. Each episode ends with an original song, which reiterates new things learned. The show is intended to motivate children to explore new things, ask questions, problem-solve and make new friends.

== Major characters ==
- Mickey the Sheepdog is a Shetland Sheepdog who lives on a farm, has a love for adventure and is very curious. His best friend is Megan. Mickey was voiced by Peter MacDonald in the first two seasons and Erin Mackey for the rest of the series.
- Megan is Mickey's 14-year-old best friend who goes to school near the farm. Every day after school, she helps Mickey answer questions and sort out problems that are different. Megan was played by Jessica Croucher in the first two seasons and Hannah Wadman-Scanlan for the rest of the series.
- Guy the Goat is a British goat who lives on the farm and is friends with Mickey and Megan. His agreeable character is wise and offers a matter-of-fact type interpretation. Guy is voiced by Charles Tomlinson, the only cast member who is credited in every episode.
- Fiona the Ferret is a likable ferret who also lives on the farm and is friends with Mickey and Megan. Her enthusiastic character is always offering creative and helpful suggestions. Fiona was voiced by Katherine Hatcher in the first season and Hannah Wadman-Scanlan for the rest of the series.
- Sunny the Sun (the sun) is an ever-present maternal character who is always watching over the farm and narrates the show. Sunny was voiced by Rhona Buchar in the first season and Allison White (who became the show's director in the second season) for the rest of the series.

== Production ==
The show was originally developed in association with The Pet Network, designed for children ages 2–8. All episodes are 11 minutes in length, with two episodes usually shown within a 30-minute time slot when aired on TV. Season 1 (26 episodes) was produced in 2009 and was directed by Christian Sparkes and was produced by Ed Martin, who was also the show's executive producer. Season one began airing on The Pet Network in October 2009 and Qubo in December 2014. Season 2 (39 episodes, the most in its run) was produced in 2010 and was directed by Allison White. Season two began airing on The Pet Network in 2010 and Qubo in late-December 2014. Seasons 3, 4 and 5 (26 episodes each) were produced and began airing in 2011, 2012 and 2013, respectively. In the UK, it aired on 4 June 2010. Each episode includes an original score created by Jeremy Rice.
