= Jane Boulton =

English television personality (born 1970)

- Born: 23 July 1970 (age 56)
- Occupation: Television personality
- Years active: 1999–2005, 2025–present
- Known for: Airline
- Website: janeboulton.co.uk

Jane Boulton (born 23 July 1970) is a British television personality and former EasyJet operations manager. She gained popularity for her quick retorts and catchphrases in the long-running documentary Airline, which she appeared in for 8 seasons.

== Career ==
Boulton first appeared in the second season of the British fly-on-the-wall docuseries Airline, which showcased the lives of passengers and EasyJet staff members in both Luton Airport and Liverpool Airport. She was a regular on the show from seasons 2 to 9 until she left the airline to work for Aer Lingus at Heathrow Airport.

She left the aviation industry in 2014, and later worked for Hertfordshire County Council while running a side business providing entertainment for children's parties in London.

In 2023, clips from Boulton's appearances on Airline began to gain attention on TikTok, featuring her memorable jabs directed at rude or late customers, including 'It's a plane not a bus' and 'A coffee shop is not departures', with some of the videos receiving as many as 25 million views.

In 2025, Boulton announced that she would be hosting a nationwide tour, An Audience with Jane Boulton, offering behind-the-scenes insight into the filming of the docuseries. The Daily Mirror announced that Boulton was working on a self-published book on customer service and conflict resolution, the primary aspects of her job in the travel industry.

== Media appearances ==
Following her renewed popularity on social media in 2023, Boulton appeared on This Morning with Alison Hammond and Dermot O'Leary, where she discussed her time at the airline and hinted at a possible return to television.

While being interviewed on the popular travel podcast Sail Away in 2024, Boulton admitted that EasyJet made all the staff sign disclaimers prior to appearing on the show, and that she made no money from her lengthy appearances despite Airline previously holding the title of Britain's most watched show.

Boulton told the Liverpool Echo that when the series first aired, she feared she would become 'the most hated woman in Britain', and was surprised by the overwhelmingly positive and sympathetic reactions from viewers.

== Personal life ==
Boulton lives in South West London with her husband Jon and their three daughters.

== See also ==
- Airline (1998 TV series)
