= Airport (TV series) =

- Airport title card from Series 8 (2002)
- Genre: Documentary
- Narrated by: John Nettles (1996–2005); Liza Tarbuck (2005); Robert Webb (2008)
- Composers: Hal Lindes; Cherry Lodge
- Country of origin: United Kingdom
- Original language: English
- No. of series: 11
- No. of episodes: 96 (+ 7 specials)

Production
- Running time: 30 minutes

Original release
- Network: BBC One (1996–2005); BBC Two (2008)
- Release: 2 May 1996 – 24 July 2008

Airport is a British documentary television series based at London Heathrow Airport, broadcast by the BBC and syndicated to Dave, part of the UKTV network.

The show is a fly-on-the-wall series following passengers and staff who work for the airlines, the airport operator BAA, the animal reception centre, emergency services, customs and immigration, and others. The airlines and staff featured change from series to series, although certain staff feature in multiple series.

== History ==
The first series of Airport aired on BBC One, beginning on 2 May 1996. It was then repeated on BBC Two in April 1997. Originally intended to be a low-key behind-the-scenes documentary, the emergence of several memorable recurring characters gave the show a docusoap feel. Special fame was gained by Jeremy Spake, an Aeroflot employee, whose flamboyance earned him a series of short "bumpers" on UKTV People explaining how best to use airports. Other airlines featured throughout the series are Aer Lingus, Air Jamaica, Avianca, BMI, Canadian Airlines, Cyprus Airways, Czech Airlines, El Al, Emirates, Gulf Air, Icelandair, Iran Air, Jat Airways, Kuwait Airways, Pakistan International Airlines, Qantas, Qatar Airways and Virgin Atlantic.

There have also been several special Airport programmes over the years featuring airports other than Heathrow, such as Frankfurt and Edinburgh.

The first version from 1996 to 2001 had the opening scenes with the entrance to the Heathrow Airport tunnel and the theme music was composed by Hal Lindes. The opening titles and music were given a make over for the start of the 7th series in 2002. From the 7th series, incidental music (composed by Cherry Lodge) was added over the scenes shown on screen. The title music was once again revamped for the 10th series in 2005. In addition, Liza Tarbuck replaced John Nettles as the show's narrator for series 10.

Celebrities who have been seen on the show include Stephen Fry, Hugh Hefner, Britney Spears, Kylie Minogue, Joan Collins, Michael Jackson, Pamela Anderson, Blue, Brian May, Tom Jones, Mohammed Burhanuddin, Yusuf Islam, Colin Powell, Kate Winslet, David Beckham, Kriss Akabusi, Al Pacino, Engelbert Humperdinck, Lennox Lewis, Bob Geldof and several government or state officials including Queen Elizabeth II, Princess Diana, the Japanese Emperor and Bill Clinton.

In one episode, a BA staff member gets arrested by the airport police for impersonating someone else. He is arrested on board an incoming flight and is led away by un-uniformed officers.

== Regular contributors ==
John Cull, Qantas Airport Manager, appears in 17 episodes. Jeremy Spake, Aeroflot Airlines Manager, makes frequent appearances in the series. Maria Demetriou of Cyprus Airways appears in many episodes. Animal Health Officer Stuart King, Royal Suite manager Anita Newcourt, and journalists Russell Clisby and Steve Meller all contribute in many of the series.

=== Other contributors ===
These include:-

Name	Airline / Occupation
Viv Eggins	Customer Service Manager, British Midland Airways
Anita Newcourt MBE	Royal Suite Manager
Michele Harris	Terminal Manager, Terminal 3
David Duddy	Customer Service Duty Manager, T1
Karen Jones	Customer Service Duty Manager, T3
Dennis Stone	Airport Photographer
Axle Gundarsson	Steward, Icelandair
Shaker Mehio	Customer Service Manager, Gulf Air
Robert Scott	Immigration Officer
Maria Demetriou	Airport Duty Manager, Cyprus Airways
Eric Day	Immigration Officer
Eben Twum-barima	Supervisor, Ghana Airways
Caroline Acherson	Immigration Officer
Sarah Collins	Check-in Supervisor, El Al
Peter Luck	Check-in Supervisor, El Al
Elaine Pringle	Dispatcher, Lufthansa
Annabel Davis	WPC
Nikki Taylor	Traffic Enforcement Officer
Siobhan Feeney	Check-in Supervisor, Aer Lingus
Corinne Cossu	Shopping Consultant
Garth Powell	Customs Officer
Gregg Bailey	Assistant Service Manager, bmi
Ciara Thorn	Check-in Manager, bmi
Merla Celestine	Airport Manager, Air Jamaica
Nauaman	Supervisor, Qatar Airways
Gerard Robinson	London Ambulance Service
Paul Schofield	London Ambulance Service
Kelvin Ogunjimi	Concierge, Canadian Airlines
Naomi Tembo	Check-in Supervisor, Kenya Airways
Mina Rughani	Airport Services Manager, Srilankan Airlines

== Production status ==
Repeats of Airport have been shown on Dave and UKTV People, and they often ran an Airport day or weekend, showing back-to-back episodes for the duration of the day or weekend. Repeats have also been seen on BBC One, although less frequently. There was a new series broadcast in the first half of 2005, which finished in July 2005. Several episodes were broadcast, before a gap of about a month, then the rest of the series was shown.

Airport is also shown once a week on the Australian Lifestyle channel, a feature channel on Australia's Foxtel Digital network and also screened on the Austar network. It is also aired on the free-to-air Nine Network.

== Transmissions ==
=== Series ===
Series	Start date	End date	Episodes
1	2 May 1996	6 June 1996	6
2	12 June 1997	14 August 1997	10
3	19 September 1998	28 November 1998	10
4	18 September 1999	12 November 1999	9
5	28 March 2000	30 May 2000	10
6	9 November 2000	22 December 2000	6
7	31 May 2001	9 August 2001	10
8	20 June 2002	25 July 2002	6
9	28 October 2002	20 January 2003	10
10	23 March 2005	21 July 2005	14
Return	14 July 2008	24 July 2008	5

=== Specials ===
Date	Entitle
22 December 1998	Christmas Special
24 December 1999	Christmas Special
6 September 2001; 22 November 2001	Airport: Miami Airport
27 April 2003; 12 June 2003	Airport USA
13 November 2003	Airport Edinburgh

== Return to... Airport ==
On 14 July 2008, the BBC broadcast a new 5-part series titled Return to... Airport. The show featured interviews with stars of the original series and behind the scenes recollections from cast members, as well as original series highlights.

== See also ==
- Airline, a similar television programme
- Come Fly With Me, a comedic mockumentary-style spoof of the Airport format created by Matt Lucas and David Walliams
- Nothing to Declare UK
