= 2C Media =

American production company

2C Media logo

Founded in 2005 by Chris Sloan and Carla Kaufman Sloan, 2C Media (2C) is a content production company and creative agency based in Miami, Florida. The company produces both original cable television programming (2C Originals) and broadcast promotion and design campaigns. The 2C production facility houses 13 edit suites, audio and in-house graphics.

== Original content ==
The company's original programming division, 2C Originals, has developed and produced the following series and specials:

- "Dr. Miami" for WE tv premiered on March 31, 2017.
- "Growing Up Gator" for Great American Country premiered on October 24, 2014.
- "Florida Untamed" for Nat Geo WILD's Destination Wild series premiered on April 27, 2014.
- "Airport 24/7: Miami" for Travel Channel premiered on October 2, 2012.
- "Swamp Wars" for Animal Planet.
- "A Stand Up Mother" for (WE tv).

== Broadcast promotion and design ==
A major segment of 2C's business is broadcast promotion and design, work that has included television series launch campaigns, streaming platform launch videos, brand integrations, sizzles, upfront presentations and other promotional elements. In 2019, the company was recognized for its contributions to this industry with its third Agency of the Year nomination from entertainment marketing association Promax. 2C ultimately earned a company-best 14 Promax Awards in 2019, with one of its winning projects, a brand integration for Discovery Channel's Shark Week and Crest, earning 6 Promax Awards, in addition to a previous Golden Trailer Award.

== Flip2C ==
In 2016, 2C announced its digital joint venture with Flipeleven Creative to launch Flip2C, expanding its services beyond the traditional television and over-the-top (OTT) space to take on projects for technology companies. Flip2C capabilities include websites, apps, micro-sites, display ads, takeovers and mobile-first products and activations, as well as the scaled video capabilities and best practices to serve diverse platforms like Vine, Snapchat, Facebook and Instagram. Among the joint venture's initial projects was a multi-platform promotional campaign for The Weather Channel mobile application. Most recently, Flip2C produced and delivered three branded videos for National Geographic’s Planet Or Plastic initiative and Brita's The Filtered Life initiative that were used across Facebook, Instagram and Snapchat, as well as on a special dedicated microsite.
