= Veronika Hyks =

English voice actress

Veronika Hyks (born 21 October 1951) is an English voice over actress and narrator. Hyks is often employed as a voice actress or works as a narrator.

== Early life ==
Hyks was born to Czech parents in the London borough of Westminster. Her family name is Hykšová.

She was a student at the University of Bristol, where she read Drama and Spanish, before graduating in 1974.

== Career ==
She mainly works as a voice-over artist, and works in audio description. She worked as a continuity announcer for Channel 4 in the 1980s. Most of her narration work has been for BBC Two, and more recently BBC Four. She is a Trustee for the Audio Description Association, a UK charity.

=== Voice over artist ===
Productions she has worked for as a narrator include:

- Frozen
- Zootopia
- Bambi
- Airline
- Celebrity Fit Club
- Cutting Edge
- Everyman
- Horizon
- Inside Story
- People's Century
- Timewatch
- World in Action
- Breaking the Sound Barrier
- Wild Discovery
- Aristotle Onassis: The Golden Greek

== Personal life ==
She married in 1982 in Westminster and has a daughter.

== See also ==
- Continuity announcers in the United Kingdom
