= Vodou art =

Vodou art may refer to:

- Haitian Vodou art, art associated with Haitian Vodou
- Vodun art, art associated with West African Vodun
