= Airline (American TV series) =

American reality television series

- Genre: Documentary
- Created by: Gold Star Television
- Starring: Southwest Airlines
- Narrated by: Tim Flavin
- Country of origin: United States
- No. of seasons: 3
- No. of episodes: 70

Production
- Running time: 21 minutes
- Production companies: Acorn Media; Gold Star; A&E

Original release
- Network: A&E
- Release: January 5, 2004 – December 19, 2005

Related
- Airline; On the Fly

Airline is an American reality television series that showcases the daily happenings of passengers, ground workers and on-board staff members of Southwest Airlines. The series debuted on January 5, 2004, on A&E and ran for three seasons. It was narrated by Tim Flavin.

On December 15, 2005, it was canceled after three seasons.

== Premise ==
The series is focused on passengers and flights originating out of Southwest Airlines focus cities at Baltimore-Washington International, Chicago Midway, Houston's Hobby Airport and Los Angeles International. The series also follows customers in all types of moods and situations, and also takes a look at employees both on and off the job.

The series is based on a non-fiction British series of the same name. The British series followed the employees of Britannia Airways in its first season and easyJet in subsequent seasons.

== Cast ==
=== Baltimore/Washington (BWI) ===
- Eric DeCosmo — Provisioning Agent
- Christy Goad-DeCosmo — Customer Service Agent
- Nicholas Hadeed — Customer Service Agent/Flight Attendant
- Carole Jennings - Customer Service Supervisor
- Sue Lee — Customer Service Supervisor
- Chris Marr — Customer Service Supervisor
- Gina Terrano — Customer Service Agent/Flight Attendant

=== Chicago-Midway (MDW) ===
- Jesse Atkinson — Customer Service Supervisor
- Colleen Bragiel — Customer Service Manager
- Val Brown — Customer Service Supervisor
- Denise Brown-Bess — Customer Service Supervisor
- Angelica Estrada — Customer Service Supervisor
- Anita Herbert — Customer Service Supervisor
- Veolia Hewitt-Norris — Customer Service Manager

=== Houston-Hobby (HOU) ===
- Holly Bradford — Customer Service Supervisor
- Kelley Casterjana — Customer Service Supervisor
- Cindy Treyes — Customer Service Supervisor
- Brian "Chance" Willams — Customer Service Supervisor
- Julie Boston — Customer Service Supervisor

=== Los Angeles (LAX) ===
- Susie Boersma — Customer Service Supervisor
- Mike Carr — Customer Service Supervisor
- Yolanda Martin — Customer Service Supervisor
- Steve Ramirez — Customer Service Supervisor
- Gustavo Yanez — Customer Service Supervisor — AirTran Airways

== Episodes ==
=== Season 1 (2004) ===
No.	Title	Original release date
1	"The Delicate Art Of Saying No"	January 5, 2004
2	"Consider Yourself One Of The Family"	January 5, 2004
3	"Kids ... Who'd Have Them?"	January 12, 2004
4	"Beyond Their Control"	January 12, 2004
5	"Times Change"	January 19, 2004
6	"Winners & Losers"	January 19, 2004
7	"Terminal Beauty"	January 26, 2004
8	"High Spirits"	February 2, 2004
9	"Team Effort"	February 9, 2004
10	"You Must Be Kidding?"	February 16, 2004
11	"Luv Is In The Air"	February 16, 2004
12	"Relative Values"	February 23, 2004
13	"For Better For Worse"	March 1, 2004
14	"It Ain't Over Til It's Over"	March 8, 2004
15	"Don't Take No For An Answer"	March 15, 2004
16	"All Creatures Great & Small"	March 22, 2004
17	"There's Real Time...Then There's Airline Time"	March 29, 2004
18	"Oh What A Performance!"	April 5, 2004

=== Season 2 (2004-2005) ===
No.	Title	Original release date
1	"Judgment Day"	July 5, 2004
2	"The Big Squeeze"	July 5, 2004
3	"Family Business"	July 12, 2004
4	"Unfit for Travel"	July 19, 2004
5	"That's Entertainment!"	July 26, 2004
6	"High And Mighty"	August 2, 2004
7	"Down To The Wire"	August 9, 2004
8	"Fly Babies"	August 16, 2004
9	"Expect The Unexpected"	August 23, 2004
10	"All Shapes And Sizes"	August 30, 2004
11	"Lost In Translation"	September 13, 2004
12	"No Laughing Matter"	September 20, 2004
13	"Emotional Baggage"	September 27, 2004
14	"The Stress Test"	October 4, 2004
15	"In Sickness And In Health"	October 11, 2004
16	"Rules Are Rules"	October 18, 2004
17	"Battle Of Wills"	November 1, 2004
18	"Let There Be Love"	November 8, 2004
19	"Precious Cargo"	November 29, 2004
20	"Dazed And Confused"	December 6, 2004
21	"You Can't Win Them All"	December 20, 2004
22	"Fun And Games"	December 20, 2004
23	"Live and Let Fly"	January 10, 2005
24	"So Near Yet So Far"	January 17, 2005
25	"Shaken & Stirred"	January 31, 2005
26	"No Going Back"	February 14, 2005

=== Season 3 (2005) ===
No.	Title	Original release date
1	"Takes Two To Tango"	May 2, 2005
2	"The Sky's The Limit"	May 2, 2005
3	"Things That Go Bump At The Airport"	May 9, 2005
4	"Mardi Gras"	May 9, 2005
5	"A Hard Day's Flight"	May 16, 2005
6	"April Fool"	May 23, 2005
7	"Life Swap"	June 6, 2005
8	"Risky Business"	June 20, 2005
9	"Mind Over Matter"	June 27, 2005
10	"Cabin Fever"	July 11, 2005
11	"Stormy Weather"	July 18, 2005
12	"When The Going Gets Tough"	July 25, 2005
13	"South Of The Border"	August 8, 2005
14	"You Can't Take It With You"	August 15, 2005
15	"It Takes All Sorts"	August 26, 2005
16	"Timing Is Everything"	August 29, 2005
17	"Let's Face The Music And Dance"	August 29, 2005
18	"Love At First Flight"	September 12, 2005
19	"Taking Care Of Business"	September 19, 2005
20	"Cruise Control"	October 10, 2005
21	"Going Places"	October 17, 2005
22	"Turbulence Everywhere"	October 24, 2005
23	"Decision Time"	November 28, 2005
24	"The Waiting Game"	December 12, 2005
25	"Crying For Help"	December 12, 2005
26	"Pushing The Limits"	December 19, 2005
