= Jeremy Spake =

British television personality and presenter

- Born: 1969 (age 56–57); Colchester, England, United Kingdom
- Occupations: Television personality; author
- Years active: 1996–present
- Known for: Appearing in the BBC documentary series Airport

Jeremy Spake (born 1969) is a British television personality and presenter from Colchester, England.

== Career ==
In 1996, Spake featured in the BBC documentary series Airport, where he worked as the ground services manager for Russian airline Aeroflot. His appearance on the programme brought him to wider public notice and celebrity. He subsequently featured in other programmes included The Toughest Job in Britain, Holiday, The Angry Pirate and City Hospital. He also appeared in Moscow for the BBC's 2000 Today programme, broadcast over the turn of 2000. In 2008, he also featured in BBC documentary Return to... Airport, which revisited the people who appeared in Airport.

Spake has written two books: Jeremy's Airport and The Toughest Job in Britain. Jeremy's Airport was based on his experiences working at Heathrow Airport as a Ground Services Manager for Aeroflot during the filming of the BBC series Airport. It describes a typical week in his job. Spake presented a series for BBC TV, The Toughest Job in Britain, and his second book is based on the jobs he was filmed doing. Such jobs included replacing the bulbs on Blackpool Tower and work on a turkey farm.

In August 2018, Spake was confirmed as the deputy director of the Isle of Man Airport. In February 2022, the BBC announced that Spake would return to Heathrow Airport to present a new six-part documentary series, The Airport: Back in the Skies, broadcast on BBC One from May 2022.

== Personal life ==
Spake is a fluent Russian speaker. He was awarded an honorary doctorate from Colchester Institute in 2014.

== Bibliography ==
- Spake, Jeremy (1998). Jeremy's Airport. BBC. ISBN 978-0563384595.
- Spake, Jeremy (2002). The Toughest Job in Britain. Boxtree. ISBN 978-0752220086.
