= Air Ways =

- Genre: Factual
- Narrated by: Corinne Grant
- Country of origin: Australia
- No. of seasons: 3
- No. of episodes: 24

Production
- Executive producer: Lyndal Marks
- Production locations: Melbourne, Coolangatta, Rockhampton, Mackay, Adelaide, Launceston, Hobart & Alice Springs airports
- Running time: 30 minutes

Original release
- Network: Seven Network
- Release: 14 July 2009 – 2012

Air Ways is an Australian factual television series broadcast on the Seven Network, narrated by Corinne Grant and produced by Lyndal Marks, the executive producer in charge of Border Security. It began screening in July 2009 and was filmed in airports including Melbourne, Coolangatta, Rockhampton, Mackay, Adelaide, Launceston, Hobart and Alice Springs.

Air Ways followed the day-to-day operations of budget airline Tigerair Australia. It had a similar premise to the successful UK factual television series Airline.

== Reception ==
=== Ratings ===
Air Ways had a strong debut, attracting an audience of 1.216 million for its first episode. Subsequent episodes have been watched by over 1.3 million viewers a week. On 25 August 2009, it was the second most popular show of the day.

Air Ways was ranked 7th in the top 15 shows for the week ending 25 July 2009 and 13th for the week ending 1 August 2009.

Episode No.	Airdate	Ratings (in millions)	Nightly Rank
1	14 July 2009	1.216	7th
2	21 July 2009	1.549	4th
3	28 July 2009	1.412	6th
4	4 August 2009	1.379	6th
5	11 August 2009	1.334	7th
6	18 August 2009	1.306	7th
7	25 August 2009	1.443	2nd
8	1 September 2009	1.310	6th

Season 2 of Air Ways also had a strong debut in a new Sunday evening time slot, ending up being the fourth most popular show of the night. The show continued to improve, moving to the number one position for several weeks running. Note that the final episode was in fact a repeat of a season one episode, perhaps explaining the sudden ratings slip.

Episode No.	Airdate	Ratings (in millions)	Nightly Rank
9	7 February 2010	1.327	4th
10	14 February 2010	1.351	3rd
11	21 February 2010	1.267	3rd
12	28 February 2010	1.342	2nd
13	7 March 2010	1.432	2nd
14	14 March 2010	1.488	1st
15	21 March 2010	1.467	1st
16	28 March 2010	1.097	7th

== Reviews ==
TV Tonight, an Australian television blog, rated Air Ways three stars out of five, saying that this format "makes for tasty voyeurism" and that "it will be very entertaining to those who eat up this genre."

== See also ==
- Airline (1998 TV series)
