= World Television =

wtv.
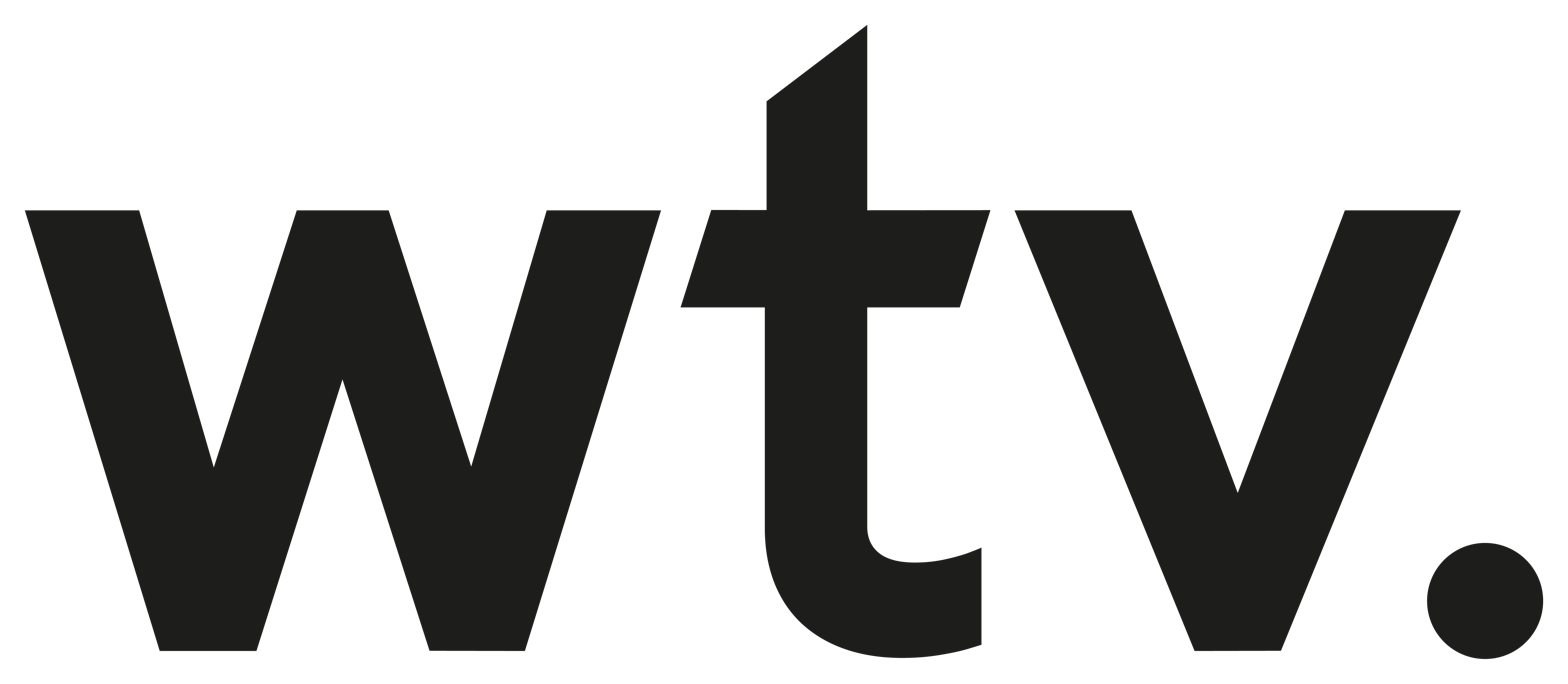
- Company type: Private
- Founded: London, England (1991)
- Founder: Andrew Booth; Peter Sibley
- Headquarters: Geneva, Switzerland
- Number of locations: London, United Kingdom; Frankfurt, Germany; Geneva, Switzerland; Madrid, Spain; Zurich, Switzerland; Hong Kong
- Key people: Peter Sibley, Executive Chairman
- Website: wtvglobal.com

wtv. is one of the longest established virtual and hybrid events technology agencies in Europe and Asia, headquartered in Geneva, Switzerland with offices in London, Frankfurt, Madrid, Hong Kong and Zurich.

The company was co-founded by Peter Sibley and Andrew Booth in 1991; by 2012, the company was managing over 2,000 projects annually in over 100 countries in more than 25 languages. The agency was originally established to support the global marketing activities of international NGOs, including Greenpeace, WWF International, Amnesty International and United Nations agencies. In the late 1990s, its activities were extended to support the global video strategies of multinational corporations, governments and international organisations.

wtv. developed its own proprietary video technology platforms with investment from Swisscom and has its own dedicated data centre and hosting services. Its online platforms include StreamStudio https://wtvglobal.com/streamstudio/], CrewStudio , ShareStudio , EventStudio and EasyWebcast </ref>

It currently manages virtual and hybrid events for over 100 clients, including many of the world's most visible companies such as Nestle, BP, HSBC, Anglo American, easyJet, Shire, the World Economic Forum, PWC, World Trade Organization, Nokia, Coca-Cola, Microsoft, Barclaycard, Santander, DHL, the United Nations agencies and the European Space Agency. The company provides live, technical, platform and creative teams which support over 2,000 events every year.

The company has won international awards for its many projects.

== Recent News ==
January 2018: World Television changes its brand to WTV.

April 2013: World Television wins at Cannes Corporate Media & TV Awards and Corporate Finance Awards for its work with Orange and SAB Miller.

December 2012: WTV SA becomes new owner of World Television's UK and European offices.

November 2011: World Television partners with Kontiki to enable network-friendly delivery of enterprise video.

May 2011: World Television launched upgraded versions of its Video360 and StreamStudio video management and distribution platforms.

April 2011: The company wins awards at the New York Festivals World's Best Television & Films™ for its work for Shire and Anglo American.

March 2011: The company was ranked sixth in Televisual Magazine's Corporate Top 50 survey and was awarded a silver medal in the International Visual Communications Association's Awards

January 2011: The company renews its longstanding contract with the European Space Agency
