= The Pet Network =

Canadian broadcast channel

- The Pet Network logo
- Country: Canada
- Broadcast area: National
- Headquarters: Toronto, Ontario

Programming
- Picture format: 480i (SDTV)

Ownership
- Owner: Stornoway Communications

History
- Launched: December 3, 2004
- Closed: May 2, 2016

The Pet Network was a Canadian English language Category B specialty channel owned by Stornoway Communications. The channel broadcast entertainment and information programming for children and adults primarily related to pets in the form of feature films, documentary films, television dramas, cartoons, docuseries, and more.

== History ==
In November 2000, a joint venture between Stornoway Communications and Cogeco were granted approval by the Canadian Radio-television and Telecommunications Commission (CRTC) to launch a television channel called The Pet Network, described as "a national English-language Category 2 specialty television service devoted to pets and working animals."

Original logo used from 2004 - 2009. The logo, during its inception, would sometimes not feature the animals pictured.

Prior to the channel's launch, in January 2004, the CRTC approved an application that would see Stornoway acquire Cogeco's interest in the proposed service, along with all other services owned by Stornoway, namely ichannel and bpm:tv.

In November 2004, Stornoway announced that it had reached an agreement with Rogers Communications to launch the channel on its digital cable platform in December 2004. The channel subsequently ran a 30-minute promotional program on a loop from November 23 until its official launch on December 3 at 5:00pm EST.

The channel would subsequently be added to various other television services providers over the years since its launch, however, the largest being Shaw Cable and Shaw Direct, added in October and November 2010, respectively. The launch on the Shaw Communications-owned platforms gave the channel wide distribution in Western Canada on cable and nationally via satellite.

The Pet Network logo from 2009 - 2012, used on Mickey's Farm endcaps

On November 12, 2012, to coincide with the launch of the channel's 2012-2013 fall programming launch, The Pet Network underwent a rebranding including of a new logo, on-air graphics, and website.

In early April 2016, it was revealed by several television service providers, via their respective websites and other communications, that the channel would cease broadcasting on May 2, 2016. Stornoway Communications, who earlier shuttered another one of its own television channels, bpm:tv, in June 2015, revealed through regulatory filings, that it shuttered the channel and was requesting to revoke its broadcast licence due to inabilities in securing financially sustainable distribution agreements with television service providers. The company would later that year exit the television broadcasting business entirely when it shuttered its last remaining channel, ichannel, citing the same reasons for closing The Pet Network.

== See also ==
- List of programs broadcast by The Pet Network
