= List of programs broadcast by A&E =

The following is a list of television programs formerly and currently broadcast by A&E.

== Current programming ==
=== Original ===
==== Reality ====
- Storage Wars (2010–present)
- Zombie House Flipping (2019–present)
- Accused: Guilty or Innocent? (2020–present)
- WWE's Most Wanted Treasures (2021–present)
- Neighborhood Wars (2021–present)
- Road Wars (2022–present)
- Interrogation Raw (2022–present)
- Customer Wars (2022–present)
- Lakefront Luxury (2022–present)
- Booked: First Day In (2023–present)
- My Strange Arrest (2023–present)
- Fugitives Caught on Tape (2024–present)
- Murder at the Motel (2024–present)
- Homicide Squad New Orleans (2025–present)
- Oceanfront Property Hunt (2025–present)
- Million Dollar Zombie Flips (2025–present)
- Ozark Law (2025–present)
- WWE LFG (2025–present)
- WWE's Greatest Moments (2025–present)
- Beer Budget Reno (2025–present)
- Duck Dynasty: The Revival (2025–present)
- Betting on Beloit (2025–present)
- The Real Estate Commission with Todd J. Drowlette (2025–present)
- Killer Investigations (2025–present) (Note: Previously aired as Murder on Trial)
- Crime in Progress (2026–present)
- Desert Law (2026–present)
- Predator Hunters (2026–present)
- K9 PD with Jim Belushi (2026–present)
- Southern Law (2026–present)
- Million Dollar Mountain Homes (2026–present)
- Squatters (2026–present)
- Zombie House Flipping: Family Business (2026–present)
- Late Night Law (2026–present)
- Swamp Patrol (2026–present)

==== Docuseries ====
- After The First 48 (2009–2014; 2020–present)
- Alaska State Troopers (2026–present)
- Biography: WWE Legends (2021–present)
- Court Cam (2019–present)
- The First 48 (2004–present)
- WWE Rivals (2022–present)

== Former programming ==
=== Original programming ===
==== Reality ====
- An Evening at the Improv (1982–96)
- Pulaski, the TV Detective (1988–90)
- Improv Tonite (1989–93)
- Caroline's Comedy Hour (1989–95)
- Breakfast with the Arts (1991–2007)
- Comedy on the Road (1991–94; 1996)
- First Flights with Neil Armstrong (1991–93)
- Investigative Reports (1991–2004)
- American Justice (1992–2005; 2021–22)
- America's Castles (1994–2005)
- Ancient Mysteries (1994–98)
- Mysteries of the Bible (1994–98)
- Live by Request (1996–2004)
- The Big House (1998)
- Christianity: The First Two Thousand Years (1998)
- City Confidential (1998–2005; 2021–25)
- A&E Top 10 (1999–2000)
- Cold Case Files (1999–2002; 2006; 2017; 2021–22, 2024-25)
- All Year Round with Katie Brown (2003)
- Makeover Mamas (2003)
- Take This Job (2003)
- Sell This House (2003–11, 2022)
- Airline (2004–05)
- Growing Up Gotti (2004–05)
- Family Plots (2004–05)
- Find & Design (2004–08)
- Dog the Bounty Hunter (2004–12)
- Bearing Witness (2005)
- Caesar's 24/7 (2005)
- Criss Angel Mindfreak (2005–10)
- Random 1 (2005–06)
- Flip This House (2005–09)
- Inked (2005–06)
- Knievel's Wild Ride (2005)
- Move This House (2005–07)
- Intervention (2005–24)
- Big Spender (2006)
- Designing Blind (2006)
- God or the Girl (2006)
- Rollergirls (2006)
- Spying on Myself (2006)
- Dallas SWAT (2006–07)
- Driving Force (2006–07)
- King of Cars (2006–07)
- Gene Simmons Family Jewels (2006–12)
- Clean This House (2007)
- Jackpot Diaries (2007)
- Sons of Hollywood (2007)
- Confessions of a Matchmaker (2007–08)
- The Two Coreys (2007–08)
- Paranormal State (2007–11)
- Private Sessions (2007–11)
- Psychic Kids (2008–10; 2019)
- Crime 360 (2008–09)
- Jacked: Auto Theft Task Force (2008)
- Manhunters: Fugitive Task Force (2008)
- Parking Wars (2008–12)
- Rocco Gets Real (2008)
- Rookies (2008–09)
- We Mean Business (2008)
- Billy the Exterminator (2009–12)
- The Fugitive Chronicles (2009–10)
- Hammertime (2009)
- The Jacksons: A Family Dynasty (2009–10)
- Keyshawn Johnson: Tackling Design (2009)
- Obsessed (2009–10)
- Steven Seagal: Lawman (2009–10)
- Tattoo Highway (2009)
- Hoarders (2009–13; 2016–24)
- $100 Makeover (2010)
- Drill Team (2010)
- Growing Up Twisted (2010)
- The Hasselhoffs (2010)
- Kirstie Alley's Big Life (2010)
- Paranormal Cops (2010)
- The Peacemaker: L.A. Gang Wars (2010)
- Runaway Squad (2010)
- The Squad: Prison Police (2010)
- Strange Days with Bob Saget (2010)
- Teach: Tony Danza (2010)
- Fix This Kitchen (2010–11)
- Fix This Yard (2010–12)
- American Hoggers (2011–13)
- Beyond Scared Straight (2011–15)
- Bordertown: Laredo (2011)
- Disaster Guy (2011)
- The First 48: Missing Persons (2011–13)
- Flipping Vegas (2011–14)
- Heavy (2011)
- Lady Hoggers (2011)
- Monster In-Laws (2011)
- Relapse (2011)
- Storage Wars: Texas (2011–14)
- Barter Kings (2012–14)
- Be the Boss (2012)
- Cajun Justice (2012)
- Duck Dynasty (2012–17)
- Flipped Off (2012)
- Hideous Houses (2012)
- Panic 911 (2012–13, 2022)
- Last Chance Driving School (2012)
- Shipping Wars (2012–15; 2021–22)
- Bad Ink (2013–14)
- Breaking Boston (2013)
- Flipping Boston (2013–14)
- The Governor's Wife (2013)
- The Killer Speaks (2013)
- Modern Dads (2013)
- Psychic Tia (2013)
- Rodeo Girls (2013)
- Southie Rules (2013)
- Storage Wars: New York (2013)
- Storage Wars: Northern Treasures (2013–2015)
- Barry'd Treasure (2014)
- Big Smo (2014–15)
- Brandi & Jarrod: Married to the Job (2014)
- Cement Heads (2014)
- Country Bucks (2014–15)
- Crazy Hearts: Nashville (2014)
- Dead Again (2014)
- Dogs of War (2014)
- Don't Trust Andrew Mayne (2014)
- Down East Dickering (2014–15)
- Duck Commander: Before the Dynasty (2014)
- Epic Ink (2014)
- Escaping Polygamy (2014–17, moved to Lifetime)
- Extreme Builds (2014)
- Godfather of Pittsburgh (2014)
- Lone Star Lady (2014)
- Love Prison (2014)
- Tiny House Nation (2014–19)
- Wahlburgers (2014–19)
- Wild Transport (2014–15)
- 8 Minutes (2015)
- American Takedown (2015)
- Behind Bars: Rookie Year (2015–16)
- Born This Way (2015–19)
- Cursed: The Bell Witch (2015)
- Donnie Loves Jenny (2015–16)
- Fear: Buried Alive (2015)
- Lachey's: Raising the Bar (2015)
- Neighbors with Benefits (2015)
- Nightwatch (2015–17; 2021–23)
- Sexy Beasts (2015)
- Storage Wars: Miami (2015–16)
- Surviving Marriage (2015)
- Fit to Fat to Fit (2016, moved to Lifetime)
- Jep and Jessica: Growing the Dynasty (2016)
- The Killing Season (2016)
- Streets of Compton (2016)
- Black and White (2016)
- The Extractors (2016)
- Going Si-ral (2016–17)
- Leah Remini: Scientology and the Aftermath (2016–19)
- Live PD (2016–20)
- 60 Days In (2016–24)
- Akil the Fugitive Hunter (2017)
- The Eleven (2017)
- The Lowe Files (2017)
- Who Killed Tupac? (2017)
- The Menendez Murders: ErikTells All (2017)
- The Murder of Laci Peterson (2017)
- Live PD: Police Patrol (2017–20; 2025)
- Cultureshock (2018)
- Cults and Extreme Belief (2018)
- Flip Wars (2018)
- Marcia Clark Investigates The First 48 (2018)
- Grace vs. Abrams (2018)
- Undercover High (2018)
- Rooster & Butch (2018)
- Very Superstitious with George Lopez (2018)
- Divided States (2018)
- Born Behind Bars (2018)
- The Clinton Affair (2018)
- Nightwatch Nation (2018)
- Raising Tourette's (2018)
- The Devil Next Door (2018)
- Live PD Presents: PD Cam (2018–20; 2025)
- Many Sides of Jane (2019)
- The First 48 Presents: Homicide Squad Atlanta (2019)
- The Toe Bro (2019)
- The Untold Story (2019)
- The Employables (2019)
- Hero Ink (2019)
- 60 Days In: Narcoland (2019)
- Addiction Unplugged (2019)
- The Day I Picked My Parents (2019)
- Behind Bars: Women Inside (2019)
- Live PD: Wanted (2019–20)
- Ghost Hunters (2019–20)
- Live Rescue (2019–21)
- Kids Behind Bars: Life or Parole (2019–21)
- Celebrity Ghost Stories (2020)
- Extreme Unboxing (2020)
- What's It Worth? (2020)
- Rescue Cam (2020–21)
- America's Top Dog (2020–21)
- Alaska PD (2020; 2024)
- Killer Cases (2020–25)
- Nature Gone Wild (2021)
- Court Cam Presents Under Oath (2021)
- Invisible Monsters: Serial Killers in America (2021)
- Hustle & Tow (2021)
- An Animal Saved My Life (2021)
- Fasten Your Seatbelt (2021)
- Dirty Rotten Cleaners (2021)
- I Survived a Serial Killer (2021–22)
- Triple Digit Flip (2021–23)
- I Survived a Crime (2021–23)
- 50/50 Flip (2022, moved to Hulu)
- Adults Adopting Adults (2022)
- BTK: Confession of a Serial Killer (2022)
- Deep Fried Dynasty (2022)
- Flipping Down South (2022)
- Secrets of the Chippendale Murders (2022)
- Bobby Brown: Every Little Step (2022)
- Origins of Hip Hop (2022)
- Digital Addiction (2022)
- Living Smaller (2022)
- First Blood (2022)
- Move or Improve (2022)
- Court Night Live (2022)
- WWE Smack Talk (2022)
- Secrets of Playboy (2022–23)
- Christmas Wars (2022–23)
- Inmate to Roommate (2022–24)
- Taking the Stand (2022–25)
- The Torso Killer Confessions (2023)
- Butchers of the Bayou (2023)
- Kings of BBQ (2023)
- Secret Sauce with Todd Graves (2023)
- Exposing Parchman (2023)
- Hip Hop Treasures (2023)
- Secrets of Miss America (2023)
- Secrets of Penthouse (2023)
- Secrets of Prince Andrew (2023)
- 24 Hour Flip (2023)
- Stone Cold Takes on America (2023)
- Witness to Murder: Digital Evidence (2023)
- Women on Death Row (2023)
- Deliciously Twisted Classics (2023)
- Best in Chow (2023)
- Murder in the 21st (2023)
- Interrogation Cam (2023–24)
- Legends of the Fork (2023–24)
- Buddy Valastro's Cake Dynasty (2023–24)
- Find My Country House (2024, moved to FYI)
- Everything But the House (2024, moved from Lifetime)
- Extreme Road Ragers (2024, moved to FYI)
- Interrogation Files (2024)
- Secrets of Polygamy (2024)
- Undercover: Caught on Tape (2024)
- Quarter Ton Teen (2024)
- Secrets of the Hells Angels (2024)
- Property Virgins (2024)
- House of Horrors: Secrets of College Greek Life (2024)
- Tell Me How I Died (2024)
- New House No Debt (2024)
- Rachael Ray's Holidays (2024)
- Cold Case Files: Murder in the Bayou (2024–25)
- 48 Hours to Buy (2024–25)
- Secrets of the Bunny Ranch (2025)
- Fugitive Hunters Mexico (2025)
- Cold Case Files: Dead West (2025)
- Florida Heat (2025)
- Stadium Lockup (2025)
- Accused: Did I Do It? (2025)
- Parent Wars (2025)
- Lie Detector: Truth or Deception (2025)
- The People v. Michael Jackson (2025)
- Family Lockup (2025)
- The Mother Flip (2025)
- Secrets of Celebrity Sex Tapes (2025)
- UFC Rivals (2026)
- Scott Peterson: The New Evidence (2026)
- Behind Bars: Officer Cam (2026)

==== Drama ====
- 100 Centre Street (2001–02)
- Nero Wolfe (2001–02)
- The Cleaner (2008–09)
- The Beast (2009)
- The Glades (2010–13)
- Breakout Kings (2011–12)
- Longmire (2012–14)
- Bates Motel (2013–17)
- Those Who Kill (2014)
- The Returned (2015)
- Unforgettable (2015–16)
- Damien (2016)

==== Miniseries ====
- The Andromeda Strain (2008)
- Bag of Bones (2011)
- Coma (2012)
- The Enfield Haunting (2015)

==== Web exclusives ====
- Cosby: The Women Speak
- O.J. Speaks: the Hidden Tapes

=== Syndicated programming ===
- Breaking Away (1985–88)
- Alas Smith and Jones (1985–89)
- Buffalo Bill (1986–89)
- United States (1986)
- Yes, Prime Minister (1986–89)
- Amanda's (1986–88)
- The Black Adder (1987–89)
- French and Saunders (1987–89)
- When Things Were Rotten (1988–89)
- The World of Survival (1988–91)
- Victory at Sea (1988–93)
- Secrets & Mysteries (1988)
- Chronicle (1988–90)
- Dead Head (1989)
- Flambards (1989–92)
- Lorne Greene's New Wilderness (1989–94)
- Profiles (1989–90)
- The Slap Maxwell Story (1989, 1991–92)
- A Fine Romance (1989–91)
- The Avengers (1990–93)
- The Fugitive (1990–95)
- Miss Marple (1990–97)
- All Creatures Great and Small (1991–92, 1998)
- Call to Glory (1991–92)
- City of Angels (1991–94)
- Delvecchio (1991–94)
- Ellery Queen (1991–94)
- Lovejoy (1991–97)
- Late Night with David Letterman (1991–92)
- Mrs. Columbo (1991–94)
- O'Hara, U.S. Treasury (1991–94)
- The Prisoner (1991)
- Rising Damp (1991–92)
- World in Action (1991–92)
- The House of Eliott (1992–95)
- In Search of... (1992–96)
- The Rockford Files (1992–96)
- Spies (1992)
- Survivors (1992)
- Police Story (1993–96)
- Banacek (1994–98)
- Columbo (1994–99, 2002)
- Law & Order (1994–2002) (Seasons 1–8 only)
- Lou Grant (1994–96)
- McCloud (1994–99)
- McMillan & Wife (1994–99)
- Remington Steele (1994–96)
- Agatha Christie's Poirot (1995–97)
- The Equalizer (1996–2000)
- Mickey Spillane's Mike Hammer (1996–98)
- The New Mike Hammer (1996–97)
- Quincy, M.E. (1996–2000)
- The Cosby Mysteries (1997–99)
- Northern Exposure (1997–2001)
- Murder, She Wrote (1998–2005)
- A Touch of Frost (1998–99)
- Simon & Simon (1999–2000)
- L.A. Law (2000–02, 2003–04)
- Magnum, P.I. (2000–03)
- NewsRadio (2000–03)
- Night Court (1999–2002)
- Crime Story (2001–02)
- The View (2002–03)
- Crossing Jordan (2002–09)
- 24 (2005–08)
- CSI: Miami (2005–17)
- Third Watch (2002–11)
- Cold Case (2006–22)
- The Sopranos (2007–15)
- Criminal Minds (2009–16)
- Ozzy & Jack's World Detour (2016–18)
- Most Daring (2020–22)
- The King of Queens (2022)
- The Rookie (2022)

=== Documentaries ===
- Warren Jeffs: Prophet of Evil (February 19, 2018)
- Jonestown: The Women Behind the Massacre (February 26, 2018)

=== Short films and music videos ===
- Kendall Ross Bean: Chopin Polonaise in A Flat (classical music video, aired in 1986)
