= A&E (German TV channel) =

German pay TV channel

- Country: Germany
- Broadcast area: Germany; Austria; Switzerland
- Headquarters: Munich, Germany

Programming
- Language: German
- Picture format: 576i (16:9 SDTV); 1080i (HDTV)

Ownership
- Owner: A&E Networks

History
- Launched: 22 September 2014; 11 years ago
- Replaced: The Biography Channel
- Closed: 29 June 2019; 7 years ago
- Replaced by: Crime & Investigation

A&E was a German pay television channel headquartered in Munich. A&E stands for Arts and Entertainment, which has been the title of A&E Network in America for many years. The channel broadcasts its full program in Germany, Austria and Switzerland. A&E is a registered trademark of The History Channel (Germany) GmbH & Co. KG. In the German-speaking world, the non-functional digital transmitter is operated in a joint venture between NBC Universal Global Networks Deutschland GmbH and A+E Networks.

A&E radiates reallife documentary around extraordinary protagonists. Crime, Deals, Family and Paranormal are the four core genres of the station. The program is compiled entirely by A+E Networks Germany and consists of synchronized productions of the American counterpart, broadcasts of the German program partner ZDF and other suppliers. The offer includes single items, weekly thematic content as well as series.

== History ==
A&E replaced The Biography Channel on all dissemination channels on September 22, 2014 in the German-speaking market.

The channel ceased broadcasting on June 29, 2019 and it was replaced by Crime & Investigation.

== Programming ==
- Attic Gold (Attic Gold - Das Glück liegt auf dem Dachboden) (2016–present)
- Barry'd Treasure (Barry'd Treasure - Der Trödelexperte) (2014-2016)
- Behind Bars: Rookie Year (Job im Knast - 60 Tage auf Bewährung) (2016–present)
- Beyond Scared Straight (Vollzug auf Probe - Teenager hinter Gittern) (2014–present)
- Brandi & Jarrod: Married to the Job (Brandi & Jarrod - Ein perfektes Team) (2015–present)
- Celebrity Ghost Stories (Übersinnliche Begegnungen - Stars erzählen) (2014–present)
- Cold Case Files (Cold Case Files - Wahre Fälle der US-Ermittler) (2017–present)
- Diabolical Women (Weiblich, Clever, Kriminell) (2015–present)
- Die Tierdocs (2016–present)
- Don't Trust Andrew Mayne (Andrew Mayne - Alles Illusion) (2014-2015)
- Duck Commander: Before the Dynasty (2015–present)
- Duck Dynasty (2014–present)
- Garage Gold (2015–present)
- Hoarders (Leben im Chaos) (2014)
- House of Love (2015–present)
- House Rules (House Rules - Dein Haus, meine Baustelle) (2015–present)
- I Escaped My Killer (2016–present)
- Leah Remini: Scientology and the Aftermath (Leah Remini: Ein Leben nach Scientology) (2017–present)
- Monster in My Family (Blutsverwandt - Der Mörder in der Familie) (2016–present)
- Motive to Murder (2018–present)
- My Crazy Ex (2015–present)
- Protokolle des Bösen (2016–present)
- Storage Wars (Storage Wars - Die Geschäftemacher) (2014–present)
- Surviving Marriage (Surviving Marriage - Ehe auf dem Prüfstand) (2015–present)
- The Great Christmas Light Fight (2014–present)
- The Haunting of... (Schatten der Vergangenheit) (2014–present)
- The Killing Season (2016–present)
- The Mind of a Murderer (Interview mit einem Mörder) (2016–present)
- Wahlburgers (2014–present)

== Audience share ==
=== Germany ===
	January	February	March	April	May	June	July	August	September	October	November	December	Annual average
2017	0.0%	0.0%	0.0%	0.0%	0.0%	0.0%	0.0%	0.0%	0.0%				
