= Yup =

Yup is a slang word for yes, see Yes and no. Yup may also refer to:

- YUP (band), a Finnish rock band
- "Yup" (song), a 2015 song by Easton Corbin
- "Choices (Yup)", a 2014 song by E-40
- YUUUP!, a catchphrase and slogan used by Dave Hester
- Yukpa language (ISO 639:yup), spoken in Venezuela and Colombia
- An abbreviation for Yellowdog Updater
- Yale University Press
- Young Urban Professional (see Yuppie)
