= List of Storage Wars Canada episodes =

Storage Wars Canada was a Canadian reality television series on OLN. It was the first international version of Storage Wars. The series follows a group of buyers looking to strike it big by buying storage units at auctions when rent is not paid. OLN started filming season 2 on June 12, 2014 with two auctions in Orillia, Ontario.

== Series overview ==
Season	Episodes	Originally released	
Season	Episodes	First released	Last released
1	36	August 29, 2013	July 17, 2014
2	12	January 8, 2015	March 26, 2015

== Episode list ==
No. in season refers to the episode's number in that particular season, whereas No. in series refers to the episode's number in the overall series.

=== Season 1 (2013) ===
No. overall	No. in season	Title	Location	Original release date
1	1	"Northern Lights. Northern Fights"	Aurora, Ontario	August 29, 2013
Roy: $4,060; Rick & Cindy: $420; Paul & Bogart: $250; Ursula: $0
2	2	"Orangeville Squeeze Play"	Orangeville, Ontario	September 6, 2013
Ursula: $2,505; Paul & Bogart: -$449; Rick & Cindy: -$1,430; Roy: $0
3	3	"You Just Got "Roy’d"!"	Brampton, Ontario	September 13, 2013
Ursula: $1,345; Roy: $1,090; Paul & Bogart: $880; Cindy & Rick: $0
4	4	"Safes n’ Snakes"	Orangeville, Ontario	September 19, 2013
Paul & Bogart: $1,320; Roy: $925; Ursula: $485; Rick & Cindy: $0
5	5	"It’s Like Archaeology, You Dig?"	Toronto, Ontario	September 26, 2013
Paul & Bogart: $905; Roy: $377; Cindy & Rick: -$95; Ursula: $0
6	6	"Ain’t No Locker Like A Birthday Locker"	Toronto, Ontario	October 3, 2013
Rick & Cindy: $2,550; Paul & Bogart: $880; Ursula: $826; Roy: $0
7	7	"Wanna Smell My Hair?"	Toronto, Ontario	October 10, 2013
Rick & Cindy: $4,875; Roy: $620; Paul & Bogart: $25; Ursula: $0
8	8	"Fashion Passion"	Newmarket, Ontario	October 17, 2013
Ursula: $1,450; Paul & Bogart: $775; Roy: $525; Cindy & Rick: $0
9	9	"Taunted, Haunted, and Most Wanted"	Toronto, Ontario	October 24, 2013
Ursula & Sue: $375; Paul & Bogart: $130; Roy: -$285; Rick & Cindy: $0
10	10	"Crazy From the Heat"	Toronto, Ontario	October 31, 2013
Cindy & Rick: $1,050; Paul & Bogart: $280; Roy: -$250; Ursula: $0
11	11	"The Thrilla in Clairevilla"	Toronto, Ontario	November 7, 2013
Bogart: $1,195; Ursula: $210; Rick & Cindy: $175; Paul: -$425; Roy: $0
12	12	"Big Cow Trouble in Little Ajax"	Ajax, Ontario	November 14, 2013
Ursula: $975; Paul & Bogart: $920; Roy: -$25; Rick & Cindy: $0
13	13	"The Rise of the Liquidator"	Woodbridge, Ontario	January 9, 2014
Roy, Paul & Bogart: $29,800; Ursula: $125; Rick & Cindy: $0^{*}Jeff Schwarz, the host from another OLN show the Liquidator, presides as the guest auctioneer in this auction.
14	14	"Canadian Pecker"	Mississauga, Ontario	January 16, 2014
Roy: $2,189; Paul & Bogart: $750; Ursula: $145; Rick & Cindy: $0^{*}Patrick Pecker presides as the guest auctioneer in this auction.
15	15	"A-locker-lypse Now"	Toronto, Ontario	January 23, 2014
Roy: $1,640; Cindy & Rick: $700; Paul & Bogart: $100; Ursula: $0
16	16	"Even Veterans Get the Blues"	Toronto, Ontario	January 30, 2014
Bogart gets a new phone. Roy gets everyone gifts to confuse the other buyers. Cindy & Rick: $870; Roy: $800; Paul & Bogart: $730; Ursula: $0
17	17	"The Seven Habits of Highly Effective Instigators"	Thornhill, Ontario	February 6, 2014
Ursula wears her lucky bird shirt. Roy listens to a self-help CD to help with the auction. Roy: $4,099; Paul & Bogart: $775; Ursula: $325; Cindy & Rick: $0
18	18	"Fast Times at Wedgie-mont High"	Brampton, Ontario	February 13, 2014
A Brampton, Ont. auction has some of the gang reliving their high-school years. Cindy & Rick: $6,500; Paul & Bogart: $660; Roy: $220; Ursula: $0
19	19	"Com-Paul-sive Behaviour"	Wasaga Beach, Ontario	February 20, 2014
Paul's penchant for lockers reaches new heights at today's auction. Ursula: $175; Roy: $70; Paul & Bogart: -$475; Rick & Cindy: $0
20	20	"Psychic Psych-Out"	Toronto, Ontario	February 27, 2014
Medium Deborah Louise Levin helps Rick and Cindy land lockers at auction. Paul & Bogart: $1,305; Ursula: $85; Cindy & Rick: -$165; Roy: $0
21	21	"Cold Turkeys"	Toronto, Ontario	March 6, 2014
Rick and Cindy try to quit smoking while out on auction day. Rick & Cindy: $6,375; Paul & Bogart: $58; Ursula: -$155; Roy: $0
22	22	"Worst Best Man Ever"	Guelph, Ontario	March 13, 2014
A wedding-bound Roy shows up at an auction in his tuxedo. Ursula: $5,750; Rick & Cindy: $4,000; Roy: $305; Paul & Bogart: $0
23	23	"The Lame, The Sick, and The Crazy"	Guelph, Ontario	March 20, 2014
It's a tough day in Guelph, with Bogart on crutches and Cindy nursing a cold. Cindy & Rick: $1,390; Paul & Bogart: $931; Roy: $650; Ursula: $0
24	24	"Crate Expectations"	Mississauga, Ontario	March 27, 2014
A charity auction of high-end storage crates has the buyers excited. Roy: $2,475; Paul & Bogart: $1,700; Ursula: $1,290; Rick & Cindy: $0
25	25	"A Bad Day to Be Bogart"	Toronto, Ontario	April 24, 2014
Paul brings Bogart's two older sisters to the auction. Roy: $4,730; Paul & kids: -$362.50; Ursula: -$610; Cindy & Rick: $0
26	26	"Ursula's Just Not That Into You"	Orillia, Ontario	May 1, 2014
Jeff Gardner returns to the show and tries to "Hook Up" with Ursula. Cindy & Rick: $750; Paul & Bogart: $55; Roy: -$1,570; Ursula: $0
27	27	"It's Don's World, We're Just Bidding In It"	Southern, Ontario	May 8, 2014
The girls are extra nice to Don in hopes of gaining the upper hand. Ursula: $1,425; Paul & Bogart: $1,225; Roy: $255; Rick & Cindy: $0
28	28	"Imitation is the Sincerest Form of Insult"	Toronto, Ontario	May 15, 2014
Roy dresses up like Paul to try throw the others off the game. Roy: $2,125; Cindy & Rick: $1,175; Paul & Bogart: $1,145; Ursula: $0
29	29	"Giddy Up!"	Cedarbrae, Ontario	May 22, 2014
Cindy and Ursula almost get into a fight. Cindy & Rick: $1,301; Paul & Bogart: $90; Roy: -$50; Ursula: $0
30	30	"L'll Roy"	Brampton, Ontario	May 29, 2014
Roy brings a puppet of himself to the auction. Ursula: $1,910; Rick & Cindy: $1,264; Paul & Bogart: $1,030; Roy: $0
31	31	"Paul and Bogart Make a Promo"	Toronto, Ontario	June 12, 2014
Paul and Bogart shoot a commercial for their store. Rick & Cindy: $2,375; Paul & Bogart: $224; Ursula: $175; Roy: $0
32	32	"London Storage is Falling Down"	London, Ontario	June 19, 2014
New treasures and old grudges. Ursula: $950; Paul & Bogart: $365; Roy: $290; Cindy & Rick: $0
33	33	"O Brother I hate Thou"	Toronto, Ontario	June 26, 2014
Roy brings his little brother to the auction. Roy & Angus: $2,015; Rick & Cindy: $1,550; Paul & Bogart: $1,375; Ursula: $0
34	34	"Spies Like Urs"	Markham, Ontario	July 3, 2014
Ursula brings her husband who is a private investigator to spy on the other buyers. Roy: $2,500; Ursula: $625; Rick & Cindy: $115; Paul & Bogart: $0
35	35	"Brawl in the Family"	Toronto, Ontario	July 10, 2014
Bogart gets mad at Paul's bidding, again. Roy: $615; Ursula: $225; Paul & Bogart: -$1,435.50; Rick & Cindy: $0
36	36	"All's Fair in Love and Storage War"	Brampton, Ontario	July 17, 2014
Life changes dramatically for all buyers, except Roy. Cindy & Rick: $15,200; Paul & Bogart: $6,300; Ursula: $1,835; Roy: $0

=== Season 2 (2015) ===
No. overall	No. in season	Title	Location	Original release date
37	1	"Bigger Stronger Meaner Dumber"	Brampton, Ontario	January 8, 2015
Paul & Bogart: $2,635; Cindy & Rick: $325; Roy: -$795; Ursula: $0
38	2	"That's Mr. Pecker to You"	Toronto, Ontario	January 15, 2015
Roy: $1,000; Cindy & Rick: $760; Ursula: $25; Paul & Bogart: $0^{*}Patrick Pecker presides as the guest auctioneer in this auction.
39	3	"Who Wants to be a Bazillionaire?"	Toronto, Ontario	January 22, 2015
Paul & Bogart: $4,880; Ursula: $650; Cindy & Rick: $0; Roy: $0
40	4	"'Cause That’s What Janitors Do!"	Toronto, Ontario	January 29, 2015
Paul, Mike & Armando: $17,660; Ursula: $520; Roy: -$1,668; Cindy & Rick: $0
41	5	"Shirt Happens"	Brampton, Ontario	February 5, 2015
Cindy & Rick: $825; Paul & Bogart: $375; Roy: $65; Ursula: $0
42	6	"Keep Your Friends Close and The Veterans Closer"	Orillia, Ontario	February 12, 2015
Ursula: $780; Roy: $175; Cindy & Rick: -$520; Paul & Bogart: $0
43	7	"Knockout Punch"	Toronto, Ontario	February 19, 2015
Ursula: $395; Cindy & Rick: $270; Roy: -$210; Paul & Bogart: $0
44	8	"Worst Laid Plans"	Toronto, Ontario	February 26, 2015
Ursula: $1,300; Cindy & Rick: $530; Roy: $135; Paul & Bogart: $0
45	9	"Chini-chilla Bang Bang"	East Gwillimbury, Ontario	March 5, 2015
Cindy & Rick: $795; Ursula: $315; Paul & Bogart: -$400; Roy: $0
46	10	"Roy Marks His Territory"	Thornhill, Ontario	March 12, 2015
Roy: $1,080; Cindy & Rick: $556; Paul & Bogart: -$550; Ursula: $0
47	11	"Kennys vs. Kennys"	Cambridge, Ontario	March 19, 2015
Cindy & Rick: $905; Paul & Kids: -$5; Ursula: -$220; Roy: $0
48	12	"Roy Dirnbeck: The Roy Dirnbeck Story"	Mississauga, Ontario	March 26, 2015
Rick & Cindy: $13,400; Ursula: $1,495; Roy: -$100; Paul & Bogart: $0
