= List of Storage Wars episodes =

This is a list of Storage Wars episodes that have aired on the A&E network over the course of its run.

As of July 18 2026 368 episodes have aired for the show

== Series overview ==
Season	Episodes	Originally released	
Season	Episodes	First released	Last released
1	19	December 1, 2010	April 20, 2011
2	33	July 20, 2011	March 4, 2012
3	26	June 5, 2012	December 18, 2012
4	26	March 18, 2013	July 2, 2013
5	35	March 18, 2014	September 30, 2014
6	18	November 11, 2014	March 3, 2015
7	13	April 1, 2015	May 20, 2015
8	20	July 21, 2015	August 25, 2015
9	15	April 5, 2016	May 24, 2016
10	25	April 12, 2017	August 2, 2017
11	29	November 8, 2017	March 28, 2018
12	16	November 7, 2018	January 30, 2019
13	10	April 20, 2021	May 25, 2021
14	36	November 2, 2021	April 19, 2022
15	24	June 6, 2023	August 15, 2023
16	10	June 7, 2025	August 16, 2025
17	12	February 28, 2026	May 9, 2026
18	TBA	May 30, 2026	TBA

== Episodes list ==
=== Season 1 (2010–2011) ===
No. overall	No. in season	Title	Location	Original release date
1	1	"High Noon in the High Desert"	Victorville, CA and Simi Valley, CA	December 1, 2010
2	2	"Railroad Roulette"	Westminster, CA	December 1, 2010
3	3	"War on the Shore"	Huntington Beach, CA	December 8, 2010
4	4	"Melee in the Maze"	Cerritos, CA	December 8, 2010
5	5	"The Old Spanish Standoff"	Riverside, CA	December 15, 2010
6	6	"All Guns To Port"	Long Beach, CA	December 15, 2010
7	7	"Senior Center Showdown"	Homeland, CA and Inglewood, CA	December 22, 2010
8	8	"Midnight in the Gardena Good and Evil"	Gardena, CA	January 12, 2011
9	9	"Collector's Last Stand"	Norwalk, CA	January 19, 2011
10	10	"School House Lock"	Fullerton, CA and Long Beach, CA	January 26, 2011
11	11	"Gambler's Last Resort"	Las Vegas, NV	February 2, 2011
12	12	"Auction Royale"	Las Vegas, NV	February 9, 2011
13	13	"Makings of a Mogul"	Perris, CA	March 16, 2011
14	14	"Trouble the Oil"	Long Beach, CA	March 23, 2011
15	15	"Chairman of the Hoard"	Orange, CA	March 30, 2011
16	16	"High End Heist"	Torrance, CA	April 6, 2011
17	17	"Young with the Gun"	Riverside, CA	April 13, 2011
18	18	"Skullduggery"	Yucaipa, CA	April 17, 2011
19	19	"Live and Let Bid"	Encinitas, CA	April 20, 2011

=== Season 2 (2011–2012) ===
No. overall	No. in season	Title	Location	Original release date
20	1	"Hang 'Em High Desert"	Victorville, CA	July 20, 2011
21	2	"Buyers on the Storm"	Whittier, CA	July 20, 2011
22	3	"Pay the Lady"	Riverside, CA	July 27, 2011
23	4	"Santa Ana Street Fight"	Santa Ana, CA	July 27, 2011
24	5	"Unclaimed Baggage"	Costa Mesa, CA	August 3, 2011
25	6	"Enemy of the Enemy"	Mission Hills, CA	August 3, 2011
26	7	"Fire in the Hole"	Mission Hills, CA	August 10, 2011
27	8	"San Burrito"	San Bernardino, CA	August 10, 2011
28	9	"Tanks for the Memories"	Huntington Beach, CA	August 17, 2011
29	10	"Land of the Loss"	Santa Ana, CA	August 17, 2011
30	11	"Almost the Greatest Show on Earth"	Irvine, CA	August 31, 2011
SP1	TBA	"Unlocked: Buy Low"	Las Vegas, NV	August 31, 2011
31	12	"Bowling for Dollars"	Upland, CA	September 7, 2011
32	13	"Get Him To The Mayan"	Laguna Niguel, CA	September 7, 2011
33	14	"Fu Dog Day Afternoon"	Laguna Hills, CA	September 14, 2011
SP2	TBA	"Unlocked: Sell High"	Las Vegas, NV	September 14, 2011
34	15	"I'm The New Mogul"	Downtown Los Angeles, CA	October 19, 2011
35	16	"Driving Miss Barry"	Westminster, CA	November 15, 2011
36	17	"Winner Winner Chicken Dinner"	Ontario, CA	November 15, 2011
37	18	"Auction Sesame"	Azusa, CA	November 22, 2011
38	19	"Stairway To Hemet"	Hemet, CA	November 22, 2011
39	20	"Scoot-A-Toot, Toot"	Long Beach, CA	November 29, 2011
40	21	"The Empire Strikes Out"	Ontario, CA	November 29, 2011
41	22	"Make It Rain, Girl"	Simi Valley, CA	December 6, 2011
42	23	"Smoke 'Em If You Find 'Em"	Newport Beach, CA	December 13, 2011
43	24	"The Drone Wars"	Gardena, CA	December 20, 2011
44	25	"Brandi's First Time"	Santa Ana, CA	January 3, 2012
45	26	"Hooray For Holly-Weird"	North Hollywood, CA	January 3, 2012
46	27	"Don't Bid So Close To Me"	Rancho Cucamonga, CA	January 10, 2012
47	28	"Not Your Average Bear"	Lancaster, CA	January 10, 2012
48	29	"Hook, Line and Sucker"	Inglewood, CA	January 17, 2012
49	30	"Operation Hobo"	Harbor City, CA	January 17, 2012
50	31	"Blame It on The Rain"	Santa Cruz, CA	January 24, 2012
51	32	"Viva La San Francisco"	San Francisco, CA	January 24, 2012
52	33	"Highland Anxiety"	Highland, CA	March 4, 2012

=== Season 3 (2012) ===
No. overall	No. in season	Title	Location	Original release date
53	1	"Third Eye of The Tiger"	La Verne, CA	June 5, 2012
54	2	"May The Vaults Be With You"	Chatsworth, CA	June 5, 2012
55	3	"The Iceman Carveth"	Oxnard, CA	June 12, 2012
56	4	"Here's Looking at You, Kenny"	Hawaiian Gardens, CA	June 12, 2012
57	5	"A Civil Accordion"	City of Industry, CA	June 19, 2012
58	6	"...More Like, WRONG Beach"	Long Beach, CA	June 19, 2012
59	7	"All's Fair in Storage and Wars"	Laguna Niguel, CA	June 26, 2012
60	8	"The Fast and The Curious"	Lancaster, CA	June 26, 2012
61	9	"From Russia With Chucks"	Gardena, CA	July 10, 2012
62	10	"The Full Monty-Bello"	Montebello, CA and Costa Mesa, CA	July 10, 2012
63	11	"Dial C for Chupacabra"	Westminster, CA and Fontana, CA	July 17, 2012
64	12	"The Ship Just Hit The Sand"	Irvine, CA	July 17, 2012
65	13	"Willkommen to the Dollhouse"	Garden Grove, CA	July 24, 2012
66	14	"The YUUUP Stops Here"	Riverside, CA	July 24, 2012
67	15	"Buy, Buy Birdie"	Chino, CA	August 7, 2012
68	16	"The Return of San Burrito"	San Bernardino, CA	August 7, 2012
69	17	"There's Something About Barry"	Lakewood, CA and Fullerton, CA	August 14, 2012
70	18	"Dr. Strangebid"	Westminster, CA	August 21, 2012
71	19	"Sheets and Geeks"	Santa Ana, CA	August 28, 2012
72	20	"No Bid for the Weary"	Costa Mesa, CA	August 28, 2012
73	21	"Straight into Compton: Biddaz with Attitude"	Compton, CA	December 4, 2012
74	22	"The Young and the Reckless"	Murrieta, CA	December 4, 2012
75	23	"Jurassic Bark"	Mission Hills, CA and Inglewood, CA	December 11, 2012
76	24	"A Tale of Two Jackets"	Hollywood, CA	December 11, 2012
77	25	"Tustin, Bee Have a Problem"	Tustin, CA	December 18, 2012
78	26	"Portrait of the Gambler"	Montebello, CA	December 18, 2012

=== Season 4 (2013) ===
No. overall	No. in season	Title	Location	Original release date	U.S. viewers (millions)
79	1	"The Big Boy vs. The Heavyweights"	La Habra, CA	March 18, 2013	unknown
80	2	"The Kook, The Chief, His Son, and The Brothers"	Lake Elsinore, CA	March 18, 2013	unknown
81	3	"Nobody's Vault But Mine"	Chatsworth, CA	March 25, 2013	unknown
82	4	"Still Nobody's Vault But Mine"	Chatsworth, CA	March 25, 2013	unknown
83	5	"Auctioning for Dummies"	Stanton, CA	April 16, 2013	3.01
84	6	"Breathalyze This"	Huntington Beach, CA	April 16, 2013	3.01
85	7	"All's Well That Urns Well"	Orange, CA and West Covina, CA	April 23, 2013	2.58
86	8	"The PA Stays in the Picture"	Rancho Cucamonga, CA	April 23, 2013	3.02
87	9	"A Time to Kiln"	San Jacinto, CA	April 29, 2013	2.41
88	10	"Like a Kung Pao Cowboy"	Montebello, CA	April 29, 2013	2.63
89	11	"Oysters on The Half Plate"	Long Beach, CA	May 6, 2013	2.35
90	12	"The Monster Hash"	Costa Mesa, CA	May 6, 2013	2.35
91	13	"Old Tricks, New Treats"	Inglewood, CA	May 14, 2013	2.37
92	14	"The Shrining"	El Monte, CA	May 14, 2013	2.64
93	15	"Orange You Glad Dan Sold It Again?"	Burbank, CA and Riverside, CA	May 28, 2013	2.60
94	16	"Barry's Angels"	Torrance, CA	May 28, 2013	2.67
95	17	"The French Job"	Laguna Niguel, CA	June 4, 2013	2.59
96	18	"That's My Jerry!"	Compton, CA	June 4, 2013	2.68
97	19	"This Lamp's For You"	Orange, CA	June 11, 2013	2.52
98	20	"There's No Place Like Homeland"	Homeland, CA	June 11, 2013	2.83
99	21	"Total Wine Domination"	Mission Viejo, CA	June 18, 2013	2.32
100	22	"The Storage Buyer in You"	Lancaster, CA	June 18, 2013	2.72
101	23	"Fear and Loathing in Placentia"	Placentia, CA	June 25, 2013	2.55
102	24	"Barry Doubtfire"	Stanton, CA	June 25, 2013	2.82
103	25	"Battle of the Brows"	Moreno Valley, CA	July 2, 2013	2.68
104	26	"Super Bros. Shuffle"	Costa Mesa, CA	July 2, 2013	2.80

=== Season 5 (2014) ===
No. overall	No. in season	Title	Location	Original release date	U.S. viewers (millions)
105	1	"Flight of the Gambler"	Montebello, CA	March 18, 2014	2.417
106	2	"The Hills Have Buys"	Rimforest, CA	March 18, 2014	2.525
107	3	"Nerds of the Round Table"	Moreno Valley, CA	March 25, 2014	2.493
108	4	"Operation: Intimidation"	West Covina, CA	March 25, 2014	2.586
109	5	"The Return of the King of Montebello"	Montebello, CA	April 1, 2014	2.531
110	6	"For A Good Time Call... Ivy"	Riverside, CA	April 1, 2014	2.434
111	7	"LBC U LTR"	Long Beach, CA	April 8, 2014	1.958
112	8	"Nuthin' But A 'G' Thang, Rene"	Riverside, CA	April 15, 2014	2.060
113	9	"Boom Goes The Dynamite?"	Murrieta, CA	April 22, 2014	2.310
114	10	"Zen Masters of the Universe"	Fontana, CA	April 29, 2014	2.452
115	11	"Darrell Sheets the Bed"	Huntington Beach, CA	June 3, 2014	1.793
116	12	"The Donut Effect"	Rancho Cucamonga, CA	June 3, 2014	1.853
117	13	"The Gutfather"	Fontana, CA	June 10, 2014	1.651
118	14	"Grin And Barry It"	Lancaster, CA	June 10, 2014	1.788
119	15	"The Adventures of Max Profit"	Moreno Valley, CA	June 17, 2014	1.829
120	16	"Ghosts Don't Need Money"	Costa Mesa, CA	June 17, 2014	2.023
121	17	"Pay The Dan"	Upland, CA and Costa Mesa, CA	June 24, 2014	2.005
122	18	"The Robot Cowboy"	Garden Grove, CA	July 1, 2014	1.646
123	19	"It's Bring Your Kids To Work Day"	Norwalk, CA	July 8, 2014	2.012
124	20	"The Mom Factor"	Lancaster, CA	July 15, 2014	N/A
125	21	"The Man in Black is Back... In Black"	Huntington Beach, CA	August 12, 2014	N/A
126	22	"The Return of the Mogul's Return!"	Montclair, CA	August 12, 2014	N/A
127	23	"Bunny Owns This Town"	Ramona, CA	August 19, 2014	N/A
128	24	"Bowling for Brandi"	West Covina, CA	August 26, 2014	N/A
129	25	"Deep In The Heart of Upland"	Upland, CA	September 2, 2014	N/A
130	26	"The Daneurysm"	Hemet, CA and Palm Springs, CA	September 8, 2014	N/A
131	27	"The Education of Miss Profit"	Moreno Valley, CA	September 16, 2014	N/A
132	28	"Bid Strong And Prosper"	Costa Mesa, CA	September 23, 2014	N/A
133	29	"Hestered in the Highlands"	Murrieta, CA	September 30, 2014	N/A
SP1	TBA	"Best Of: The Finds"	Compilation	June 24, 2014	1.775
SP2	TBA	"Best Of: The Blunders"	Compilation	July 1, 2014	1.476
SP3	TBA	"Best of: The Strategies"	Compilation	July 8, 2014	1.668
SP4	TBA	"Best of: The Feuds"	Compilation	July 15, 2014	N/A
SP5	TBA	"Best Of: Jarrod and Brandi"	Compilation	August 19, 2014	N/A
SP6	TBA	"Best Of: Darrell and Brandon"	Compilation	August 26, 2014	N/A

=== Season 6 (2014–2015) ===
No. overall	No. in season	Title	Location	Original release date	U.S. viewers (millions)
134	1	"Auction Boogaloo"	Stanton, CA	November 11, 2014	1.78
135	2	"My Little Brony"	Oceanside, CA	November 11, 2014	1.76
136	3	"Locktoberfest!"	Montebello, CA	November 18, 2014	1.93
137	4	"The Emperor of El Monte"	El Monte, CA	November 18, 2014	N/A
138	5	"Up the Ante in El Monte"	El Monte, CA	November 25, 2014	1.54
139	6	"All Along the Swatchtower"	Los Angeles (Koreatown), CA	December 2, 2014	1.72
140	7	"A San Marcos Mitzvah"	San Marcos, CA	December 9, 2014	1.75
141	8	"A Very Miraculous Storage Wars Christmas!"	Dan and Laura's house	December 16, 2014	1.87
142	9	"(North) Hollywood Hustle"	North Hollywood, CA	January 6, 2015	1.65
143	10	"Who Let the Daves Out?"	Huntington Beach, CA	January 6, 2015	1.69
144	11	"Gambler of Thrones"	Palm Springs, CA	January 13, 2015	1.83
145	12	"Once Upon a Locker in the West"	Santa Ana, CA	January 20, 2015	N/A
146	13	"Locker Mountain High"	Upland, CA and Rimforest, CA	January 27, 2015	1.97
147	14	"Fontan-o-rama"	Fontana, CA	February 3, 2015	1.76
148	15	"Mr. Nezhoda's Opus"	Torrance, CA	February 10, 2015	N/A
149	16	"Leader of the Packed"	Bellflower, CA	February 17, 2015	N/A
150	17	"Lock and Roll"	Mission Hills, CA	February 24, 2015	N/A
151	18	"Too Fast, Too Curious"	Riverside, CA	March 3, 2015	N/A
SP7	TBA	"Best Of Barry Weiss"	TBA	November 25, 2014	1.32
SP8	TBA	"Best Of The Appraisals"	TBA	December 2, 2014	1.54

=== Season 7 (2015) ===
- Auctioneers: Dan & Laura Dotson
- Buyers: Dave Hester, Jarrod Schulz & Brandi Passante, Darrell & Brandon Sheets, Rene & Casey Nezhoda, Ivy Calvin, and Mary Padian

No. overall	No. in season	Title	Location	Original release date
152	1	"Padian: P.I."	Fontana, CA	April 1, 2015
153	2	"The Thrill of a Kitty and the Agony of Smoked Meat"	Moreno Valley, CA	April 1, 2015
154	3	"The Sweet Sniff of Success"	West Covina, CA	April 8, 2015
155	4	"There Will Be Blood Money"	Riverside, CA	April 8, 2015
156	5	"It's All Smoke and Mirrors"	Rancho Cucamonga, CA	April 15, 2015
157	6	"Packed, Stacked and All...Trash?"	Costa Mesa, CA	April 22, 2015
158	7	"Bozek Is My Spirit Animal"	Lake Elsinore, CA	April 29, 2015
159	8	"What Cowboy Dreams May Come"	Santa Ana, CA	May 6, 2015
160	9	"Too Many Cooks in the Locker"	Lancaster, CA	May 6, 2015
161	10	"Tinseltown Tussle"	North Hollywood, CA	May 13, 2015
162	11	"Ivy for the Win"	Arcadia, CA	May 13, 2015
163	12	"High Stakes and Low Blows"	Montebello, CA	May 20, 2015
164	13	"Valley of the Hauls"	Moreno Valley, CA	May 20, 2015

=== Season 8 (2015) ===
- Auctioneers: Dan & Laura Dotson
- Buyers: Dave Hester, Jarrod Schulz & Brandi Passante, Darrell & Brandon Sheets, Rene & Casey Nezhoda, Ivy Calvin, and Mary Padian

No. overall	No. in season	Title	Location	Original release date
165	1	"They'll Always Have Perris"	Perris, CA	July 21, 2015
166	2	"Some Like It Hotter"	Palm Desert, CA	July 28, 2015
167	3	"Lock the Vote!"	El Cajon, CA	August 4, 2015
168	4	"All Bid and No Bite"	Rancho Palos Verdes, CA	August 11, 2015
169	5	"Just Deserts"	Indio, CA	August 18, 2015
170	6	"Auctions and Allies"	Los Angeles (Koreatown), CA	August 25, 2015
171	7	"Palm Springs Throwdown"	Palm Springs, CA	October 6, 2015
172	8	"Young Gun, Old Tricks"	Santa Ana, CA	October 6, 2015
173	9	"The School Of Hard Knock-Knocks"	Rancho Dominguez, CA	October 13, 2015
174	10	"An Auction Too Far"	Santa Ana, CA and Hawaiian Gardens, CA	October 13, 2015
175	11	"Downtown Showdown"	Los Angeles, CA	October 20, 2015
176	12	"Mo' Money, Mo' Valley"	Moreno Valley, CA	October 20, 2015
177	13	"Lock, Stock and One Smoking Darrell"	Lancaster, CA	October 27, 2015
178	14	"Rene Abides"	Huntington Beach, CA	October 27, 2015
179	15	"Last Mattress Standing"	Norwalk, CA	November 3, 2015
180	16	"Mayor of Margarita-ville"	Beaumont, CA	November 3, 2015
181	17	"Auctions Away!"	Palm Springs, CA	November 10, 2015
182	18	"Buys and Dolls"	Torrance, CA and Lancaster, CA	November 10, 2015
183	19	"There's No Business Like Snow Business"	Rimforest, CA	November 17, 2015
184	20	"The World Accordion to Ivy"	West Covina, CA	November 24, 2015

=== Season 9 (2016) ===
- Auctioneers: Dan & Laura Dotson
- Buyers: Dave Hester, Jarrod Schulz & Brandi Passante, Darrell & Brandon Sheets, Rene & Casey Nezhoda, Ivy Calvin, and Mary Padian

No. overall	No. in season	Title	Location	Original release date
185	1	"Mexican Grand Off"	San Diego, CA and Adelanto, CA	April 5, 2016
186	2	"From Dust 'Til Dawn"	Mojave, CA	April 5, 2016
187	3	"Middle-Aged Mutant Ninja Buyers"	Westminster, CA	April 12, 2016
188	4	"Downtown Lockers and Uptown Dreams"	Los Angeles, CA	April 12, 2016
189	5	"Dreams of Cookies and Cream"	Moreno Valley, CA	April 19, 2016
190	6	"Who Wet the Sheets?"	Riverside, CA	April 19, 2016
191	7	"Santa Ana Surprise"	Rancho Cucamonga, CA	April 26, 2016
192	8	"High Scores In Arcadia"	Arcadia, CA	April 26, 2016
193	9	"The Lion of Lancaster"	Lancaster, CA	May 3, 2016
194	10	"Mary's Big Score"	El Monte, CA	May 3, 2016
195	11	"¡Auctions Arriba!"	Palm Springs, CA	May 10, 2016
196	12	"The One with Mary and Allee"	North Hollywood, CA	May 10, 2016
197	13	"Sundown Showdown"	Huntington Beach, CA and North Hollywood, CA	May 17, 2016
198	14	"Father Bids Best"	Montebello, CA	May 17, 2016
199	15	"The Fat Lady is Warming Up"	Van Nuys, CA	May 24, 2016

=== Season 10 (2017) ===
- Auctioneers: Dan & Laura Dotson, Emily Wears
- Buyers: Dave Hester, Jarrod Schulz & Brandi Passante, Darrell & Brandon Sheets, Rene & Casey Nezhoda, Ivy Calvin, Mary Padian, and Kenny Crossley

No. overall	No. in season	Title	Location	Original release date
200	1	"Stakes, Buys and Video Games"	Orange, CA	April 12, 2017
201	2	"Goodness, Gracious, Great Coats of Fire"	Moreno Valley, CA	April 12, 2017
202	3	"Bright Lights, Big Biddies"	Arcadia, CA	April 19, 2017
203	4	"The Nutty Appraiser"	Adelanto, CA	April 19, 2017
204	5	"Who Wants to Be a Mi-li-NER?"	Costa Mesa, CA	April 26, 2017
205	6	"I Learned it From Watching You!"	Huntington Beach, CA	April 26, 2017
206	7	"Quoth the Kenny: Kumbaya!"	Riverside, CA	May 3, 2017
207	8	"Pop, Lock & Auction"	Los Angeles (Koreatown), CA	May 3, 2017
208	9	"Happiness is a Warm Laser Gun"	El Monte, CA	May 10, 2017
209	10	"That's the Way the Terra Cotta Crumbles"	Moreno Valley, CA	May 10, 2017
210	11	"Granny Get Your Gun"	Montebello, CA	May 17, 2017
211	12	"Olé/GYN"	Van Nuys, CA	May 17, 2017
212	13	"You Win Some, You Luge Some"	Indio, CA	May 24, 2017
213	14	"Value of the Dolls"	Walnut, CA	May 24, 2017
214	15	"L. Ron YUUUPer"	Whittier, CA	May 31, 2017
215	16	"Good MOURNING, Arcadia!"	Arcadia, CA	May 31, 2017
216	17	"Drawn & Quartered"	Huntington Beach, CA	June 7, 2017
217	18	"Hare Today, Gun Tomorrow"	Fontana, CA	June 7, 2017
218	19	"The Clamper Caper"	Victorville, CA	June 14, 2017
219	20	"Shave and a Haircut: Two Bids"	El Monte, CA	June 14, 2017
220	21	"Vamos a Placentia"	Placentia, CA	July 12, 2017
221	22	"Mutt-erial Girl"	Riverside, CA	July 19, 2017
222	23	"Me, Myself and Ivy"	Arcadia, CA	July 26, 2017
223	24	"666: The Sign of the Profit"	San Bernardino, CA	August 2, 2017
224	25	"Tour de Chance"	Mentone, CA	August 2, 2017

=== Season 11 (2017–2018) ===
- Auctioneers: Dan & Laura Dotson, Emily Wears
- Buyers: Dave Hester, Jarrod Schulz & Brandi Passante, Darrell & Brandon Sheets, Rene & Casey Nezhoda, Ivy Calvin, Mary Padian, Kenny Crossley, Shana Dahan & Edwina Registre, and Justin Bryant

No. overall	No. in season	Title	Location	Original release date
225	1	"The Wild Wild Vests"	Canyon Country, CA	November 8, 2017
226	2	"Out of the Frying Pan Am"	Riverside, CA	November 8, 2017
227	3	"Season of the Kitsch"	Victorville, CA	November 15, 2017
228	4	"A Metamorphic Layer of True Romanticism"	Lancaster, CA	November 15, 2017
229	5	"Some Don't Like It Hot"	Riverside, CA	November 22, 2017
230	6	"Kumba-YUUUP!"	El Monte, CA	November 29, 2017
231	7	"Vegas Shrugged"	Placentia, CA	November 29, 2017
232	8	"Assassin's Greed"	Rancho Palos Verdes, CA	December 6, 2017
233	9	"A Fistful of Dollar"	Paramount, CA	December 6, 2017
234	10	"One Girl's Trinket Is Another Man's Treasure"	Adelanto, CA	December 13, 2017
235	11	"Buyerina"	Orange, CA	December 13, 2017
236	12	"Preaching to the Buyer"	West Covina, CA	December 20, 2017
237	13	"Some Mo' Mr. Nice Guy"	Moreno Valley, CA	December 20, 2017
238	14	"Top Meat and Greet"	Riverside, CA	January 10, 2018
239	15	"Whiskers and Lies"	Hawaiian Gardens, CA	January 10, 2018
240	16	"Crate Balls of Fire"	Santa Ana, CA	January 17, 2018
241	17	"Ivy Gets the Runaround"	Stanton, CA	January 17, 2018
242	18	"Fa-La-La-Lala, La-La-La-Locker!"	Riverside, CA	January 24, 2018
243	19	"The Way of the YUUUP!"	Torrance, CA	January 31, 2018
244	20	"Goat Tell It on the Mountain"	Rimforest, CA	February 7, 2018
245	21	"Ivy: The Pro-fession-ale"	Rancho Cucamonga, CA	February 21, 2018
246	22	"Mary's RE-finds"	Los Angeles, CA	February 28, 2018
247	23	"Crickets and Wickets"	West Covina, CA	March 7, 2018
248	24	"Quality Bro Chime"	Thousand Oaks, CA	March 14, 2018
249	25	"And Mary Ran Away With the Spoon"	Huntington Beach, CA	March 14, 2018
250	26	"Indiana Ivy and the Temple of Phlegm"	Montebello, CA	March 21, 2018
251	27	"Tour de Van Nuys"	Van Nuys, CA	March 21, 2018
252	28	"Bo-ZAK That Whip!"	Orange, CA	March 28, 2018
253	29	"We Don't Use the 'S' Word Around Here"	Buena Park, CA	March 28, 2018

=== Season 12 (2018–2019) ===
- Auctioneers: Dan & Laura Dotson, Emily Wears
- Buyers: Dave Hester, Jarrod Schulz & Brandi Passante, Darrell & Brandon Sheets, Rene & Casey Nezhoda, Ivy Calvin, Mary Padian, Kenny Crossley, Shana Dahan & Edwina Registre, and Justin Bryant

No. overall	No. in season	Title	Location	Original release date
254	1	"The Jenny, The Baker, The Prosthetics Maker"	Menifee, CA	November 7, 2018
255	2	"Weekend at Barry's"	Los Angeles (Koreatown), CA	November 7, 2018
256	3	"A Sale of Two Cities"	Walnut, CA and Whittier, CA	November 14, 2018
257	4	"They Shoe Horses, Don't They?"	Hesperia, CA	November 14, 2018
258	5	"Talkin' In Cody"	Moreno Valley, CA	November 21, 2018
259	6	"Om Sweet Om"	Brea, CA	November 21, 2018
260	7	"Grandma's Havoc"	Victorville, CA	November 28, 2018
261	8	"Cloudy with a Chance of Profit"	Van Nuys, CA	November 28, 2018
262	9	"Let's Give `Em Something to Tonka About"	Murrieta, CA	January 9, 2019
263	10	"Fowl Play"	Torrance, CA	January 9, 2019
264	11	"What Came First: The Chicken or the Auction?"	Rialto, CA	January 16, 2019
265	12	"The Wind Beneath Our Bids"	Desert Hot Springs, CA	January 16, 2019
266	13	"Not All That Glitters is Gourd"	Orange, CA	January 23, 2019
267	14	"Mistress of the Snark"	Stanton, CA	January 23, 2019
268	15	"Nowhere to Formaldehyde"	Hawaiian Gardens, CA	January 30, 2019
269	16	"Drama in the LBC"	Long Beach, CA	January 30, 2019

=== Season 13 (2021) ===
- Auctioneers: Dan & Laura Dotson
- Buyers: Jarrod Schulz, Brandi Passante, Darrell Sheets, Rene & Casey Nezhoda, Ivy Calvin, Kenny Crossley, Lisa Delarios

No. overall	No. in season	Title	Location	Original release date
270	1	"Santanas Are Coming to Town"	Santa Ana, CA	April 20, 2021
271	2	"Bits and Pizzas"	Montebello, CA	April 20, 2021
272	3	"Let's Make a Dill!"	Montebello, CA	April 27, 2021
273	4	"Mirro, Mirro, on the Floor"	Santa Ana, CA	April 27, 2021
274	5	"Rules #1"	Moreno Valley, CA	May 4, 2021
275	6	"Queen-baya!"	Canyon Country, CA	May 4, 2021
276	7	"Game of Groans: Whittier Is Coming"	Whittier, CA	May 11, 2021
277	8	"Breaking Bread"	Perris, CA	May 11, 2021
278	9	"Dr. D and the Mystery Machines"	Brea, CA	May 18, 2021
279	10	"A Plane Flew Over the Cuckoo's Nest"	Riverside, CA	May 25, 2021

=== Season 14 (2021–2022) ===
- Auctioneers: Dan & Laura Dotson
- Buyers: Brandi Passante, Darrell Sheets, Rene & Casey Nezhoda, Ivy Calvin, Kenny Crossley, Barry Weiss, Lisa Delarios and Dusty Riach

No. overall	No. in season	Title	Location	Original release date
280	1	"Older and Weiss-er"	West Covina, CA	November 2, 2021
281	2	"Let My Lockers Go"	San Bernardino, CA	November 2, 2021
282	3	"Fears of a Clown"	Victorville, CA	November 9, 2021
283	4	"Stanton and Re-Deliver"	Stanton, CA	November 9, 2021
284	5	"The Old Man and the Spree"	Oceanside, CA	November 16, 2021
285	6	"She Bidded Me With Science!"	Placentia, CA	November 16, 2021
286	7	"Not So Easy Rider"	Riverside, CA	November 23, 2021
287	8	"An Austrian in Perris"	Perris, CA	November 30, 2021
288	9	"Pretty Fly...For a Locker!"	San Bernardino, CA	November 30, 2021
289	10	"High Tea and Boxed Whine"	Santa Ana, CA	December 7, 2021
290	11	"Miss Direction...If You're Nasty"	Riverside, CA	December 7, 2021
291	12	"She Sure Has a Type"	Lancaster, CA	December 14, 2021
292	13	"The Devil Buys Used Prada"	Canyon Country, CA	December 14, 2021
293	14	"Cash is King"	Montebello, CA	December 21, 2021
294	15	"Spidey Cents"	Placentia, CA	December 28, 2021
295	16	"Another One Bites the Dusty"	Stanton, CA	December 28, 2021
296	17	"Come and Knock on Our Locker"	Fullerton, CA	January 4, 2022
297	18	"Nothing is Impossible"	Moreno Valley, CA	January 4, 2022
298	19	"Karma is a Bid"	Banning, CA	January 11, 2022
299	20	"In Dusty We Trusty"	Riverside, CA	January 11, 2022
300	21	"The Hunchy-Back of La Habra"	La Habra, CA	January 18, 2022
301	22	"The 300th Time's the Charm!"	Van Nuys, CA	January 18, 2022
302	23	"You Can Lead a Horse to a Locker, but You Can't Make Him Bid"	Riverside, CA	March 8, 2022
303	24	"Piles To Go Before I Keep"	Fullerton, CA	March 8, 2022
304	25	"In Pain in the Membrane"	Victorville, CA	March 15, 2022
305	26	"How the West Covina Was Won"	West Covina, CA	March 15, 2022
306	27	"King of Orange... Chicken"	Orange, CA	March 22, 2022
307	28	"Lego My Locker"	Stanton, CA	March 22, 2022
308	29	"Reign or Shine"	Montebello, CA	March 29, 2022
309	30	"The King of Montebowl-o"	Montebello, CA	March 29, 2022
310	31	"Here Comes the Calvin-ry!"	Riverside, CA	April 5, 2022
311	32	"Zip Tie Lies"	San Bernardino, CA	April 5, 2022
312	33	"Children of the Cornbread"	Lancaster, CA	April 12, 2022
313	34	"Proxy Moxie"	El Monte, CA	April 12, 2022
314	35	"Two for the Price of Dust"	Riverside, CA	April 19, 2022
315	36	"It's a Safe Time to Get Lit!"	Huntington Beach, CA	April 19, 2022

=== Season 15 (2023) ===
- Auctioneers: Dan & Laura Dotson
- Buyers: Brandi Passante, Darrell Sheets, Rene & Casey Nezhoda, Ivy Calvin, Kenny Crossley, Barry Weiss, Lisa Delarios and Dusty & Lupe Riach

No. overall	No. in season	Title	Location	Original release date
316	1	"All Hail, King Brandi: The Rule-Her of West Covina"	West Covina, CA	June 6, 2023
317	2	"YOLO Bolo!"	Riverside, CA	June 6, 2023
318	3	"Stanton in the Place Where You Work"	Stanton, CA	June 13, 2023
319	4	"Perm-anently Fulle"	Fullerton, CA	June 13, 2023
320	5	"I Love Lupe!"	Rosamond, CA	June 20, 2023
321	6	"Etrog, Lupe?"	Lancaster, CA	June 20, 2023
322	7	"Vending, Vidi, Vici!"	Palm Springs, CA	June 27, 2023
323	8	"Parasol Pals"	Oceanside, CA	June 27, 2023
324	9	"The Way of the Gam Gam"	Santa Ana, CA	July 11, 2023
325	10	"Four Bidders and a Funeral"	Montebello, CA	July 11, 2023
326	11	"Manifest Chastity"	Santa Ana, CA	July 18, 2023
327	12	"We Fun-Did It!"	Victorville, CA	July 18, 2023
328	13	"San Brandi-Dino!"	San Bernardino, CA	July 25, 2023
329	14	"Your PawPaw Loves You!"	Moreno Valley, CA	July 25, 2023
330	15	"Strings & Beans"	Stanton, CA	August 1, 2023
331	16	"Pin Up or Shut Up"	Fullerton, CA	August 1, 2023
332	17	"Rock, Paper, Winner"	Montebello, CA	August 8, 2023
333	18	"Does a Bear Bid in the Woods?"	Lake Arrowhead, CA	August 8, 2023
334	19	"California Knows How to Pottery"	Rosamond, CA	August 8, 2023
335	20	"If Ya Got It, Flaut It"	Lancaster, CA	August 8, 2023
336	21	"We Were Promised Fun"	Victorville, CA	August 15, 2023
337	22	"Every Party Needs a Pooper"	Moreno Valley, CA	August 15, 2023
338	23	"Five Cards But No Stud"	West Covina, CA	August 15, 2023
339	24	"Why Did the Chicken Cross the Road? Don't Ask Brandi"	Fullerton, CA	August 15, 2023

Notes: This is also the final season to feature Darrell Sheets after his death on April 22, 2026.

=== Season 16 (2025) ===
- Auctioneers: Dan & Laura Dotson
- Buyers: Dave Hester, Brandi Passante, Rene & Casey Nezhoda, Ivy Calvin, Kenny Crossley, Lisa Delarios and Dusty & Lupe Riach

No. overall	No. in season	Title	Location	Original release date
340	1	"The Return of the Return of San Burrito"	San Bernardino, CA	June 7, 2025
341	2	"One Man's Trash... Is Lisa's Trash"	Montebello, CA	June 14, 2025
342	3	"Weathering Sights"	Banning, CA	June 21, 2025
343	4	"YUUUPocalypse Now!"	Riverside, CA	June 28, 2025
344	5	"Cheesy Does It!"	El Monte, CA and West Covina, CA	July 12, 2025
345	6	"I Am Gary, Hear Me Bid!"	Moreno Valley, CA	July 19, 2025
346	7	"Survey Says... Payback's a Bit*h!"	Lancaster, CA	July 26, 2025
347	8	"The INKredible Mr. Calvin"	Garden Grove, CA	August 2, 2025
348	9	"Yes We Cam!"	Long Beach, CA	August 9, 2025
349	10	"I'm in a Canyon Country State of Mind"	Canyon Country, CA and Stanton, CA	August 16, 2025

=== Season 17 (2026) ===
- Auctioneers: Dan & Laura Dotson
- Buyers: Dave Hester, Brandi Passante, Ivy Calvin, Mary Padian, Kenny Crossley, Lisa Delarios, Dusty & Lupe Riach and Emily Pokoj and Chad

No. overall	No. in season	Title	Location	Original release date
350	1	"All About Steve"	Moreno Valley, CA	February 28, 2026
351	2	"There's No River in Riverside!"	Riverside, CA	February 28, 2026
352	3	"Million Dollar Brandi"	West Covina, CA	March 7, 2026
353	4	"Not Mary's First Rodeo"	Moreno Valley, CA	March 14, 2026
354	5	"It's a Brew-tiful Day in Fullerton"	Fullerton, CA	March 21, 2026
355	6	"Diamonds and Tigers and Bids... Oh My!"	Rancho Palos Verdes, CA and Garden Grove, CA	March 28, 2026
356	7	"The Slings and Arrows of Outrageous Lockers"	Hemet, CA	April 4, 2026
357	8	"Goody Two Hundred-Shoes"	Riverside, CA	April 11, 2026
358	9	"The Count of Montebello"	Montebello, CA	April 18, 2026
359	10	"Like Dollars for Chocolate"	Banning, CA	April 25, 2026
360	11	"Hauntington Beach"	Huntington Beach, CA	May 2, 2026
361	12	"A Song of Vinyl and Denim"	Santa Ana, CA	May 9, 2026

=== Season 18 (2026) ===
- Auctioneers: Dan & Laura Dotson
- Buyers: Dave Hester, Brandi Passante, Ivy Calvin, Mary Padian, Kenny Crossley, Lisa Delarios, Dusty & Lupe Riach and Emily Pokoj

No. overall	No. in season	Title	Location	Original release date
362	1	"Tchotchkes, Not Poppycocksis"	Orange, CA and Fullerton, CA	May 30, 2026
363	2	"The Puppet Master of Lancaster"	Lancaster, CA	June 6, 2026
364	3	"Baby Jesus, Take the Wheel"	Torrance, CA and Stanton, CA	June 13, 2026
365	4	"Butch Cassidy and the Mayonnaise Kid"	Montebello, CA	June 20, 2026
366	5	"The War of the Riaches"	Fullerton, CA	June 27, 2026
367	6	"It's Not Easy Drinking Green"	Riverside, CA	July 11, 2026
368	7	"The Skeet Smell of Success!"	Garden Grove, CA and Orange, CA	July 18, 2026
369	8	"Sis-ception"	Moreno Valley, CA	November 28, 2026
370	9	"Vaults in the Box?!"	Redlands, CA	December 5, 2026
371	10	"Making the Pole Work for You"	Los Angeles, CA	December 12, 2026
372	11	"Bid Loudly and Carry a Big Stick"	Riverside, CA	December 19, 2026
