= Dan Dotson =

American auctioneer (born 1962)

- Born: November 23, 1962 (age 63); Riverside, California, US
- Occupations: Auctioneer, television personality
- Years active: 1974–present
- Known for: Storage Wars
- Spouse: Laura Dotson
- Website: americanauctioneers.com

Dan Dotson (born November 23, 1962, California, U.S.) is an American auctioneer who has been in the auctioneering business since 1974. Dan and his wife, Laura Dotson, run American Auctioneers, a full service auction company in Riverside, California. Dan is best known for being the auctioneer on A&E Network's Storage Wars. In 2018, he auctioned off a unit containing $7.5 million in cash in a safe. Dan is part of a motorcycle club, he is currently ranked as "Secretary". His wife Laura is also in the club with him.

== Early life ==
Dotson became familiar with auctioneering, having been around the business since 1974. His grandfather, Sam Fancher, was a cattle and farm auctioneer in the Ozark Mountains region of northwest Arkansas. His grandfather was apprenticed as an auctioneer by Detmen Mitchell in 1945.

At the age of 11, Dotson was taught to auctioneer by his grandfather, with whom he worked as an auctioneer during the next four summers when he was not in school. At the age of 16, Dotson would skip school and instead go to the Chino auction in California, where he sold furniture for an auctioneer named Merl Bernard.

== Career ==
=== American Auctioneers ===
Dotson started American Auctioneers in 1983. In the 1980s and 1990s, Dotson ran an auction house in Riverside that specialized in collectibles, pottery, porcelain dolls and furniture. In 1996 Dotson met Laura, who later became his wife. Laura also became Dan's business partner, and now is co-owner and manager of American Auctioneers.

American Auctioneers currently specializes in auctions of storage units, estates, business inventories, and equipment, plus legal/foreclosure auctions, fundraisers, and appraisals. Dotson averages two auctions a day, six days a week.

=== Storage Wars ===
In December 2010, Dotson and his wife began appearing on A&E's Storage Wars, a reality series which follows four professional buyers and their teams as they bid on storage units that are in default. Ordinarily, Dan acts as the auctioneer and Laura as the ringman, but these roles are occasionally reversed (often at Laura's request). Dan's auction chant on the show utilizes slurred multi-syllabic filler rattled out very quickly, while Laura's auction chant uses more distinct filler words and therefore sounds slower than her husband's.

His involvement in Storage Wars has led to him being featured in several news articles including The Washington Post, USA Today, and TMZ. In 2015 Examiner.com reported that "Thom Beers came up with the idea for Storage Wars, but said that Dan and Laura Dotson inspired it."

== Personal life ==
Dotson met his future wife Laura in 1996, together they have a son. He has two kids from a previous marriage.

=== Illness ===
On June 16, 2014, Dotson suffered from a double aneurysm. He awoke at 1:30 AM asking "weird questions" in his sleep. When he awoke again at 7:30 AM, he complained of double vision and not feeling right. He went back to sleep and woke to take a shower. He collapsed and his wife Laura dialed 911. It is reported that she was given instructions from the 911 operator on how to administer CPR. Dotson underwent surgery to repair the damage.

== Television appearances ==
- Storage Wars – 2010 to present
- Happening Now – Dan and Laura discuss gold treasure found at auction
- Hot in Cleveland – Dan and Laura cameo in third season episode titled "Storage Wars"
- Fox & Friends – Dan and Laura are guests
- Anderson Live – Dan and Laura are guests on the episode along with Jimmy Fallon
- The Home and Family Show – Dan and Laura are guests
- SportsCenter – Dan announces the top 50 plays of 2013
- Critics' Choice Movie Awards – Dan recites the filmography of Kevin Costner
