= Laura Dotson =

American auctioneer (born 1968)

- Born: Laura Christine Payton; May 13, 1968 (age 58); Thousand Oaks, California, U.S.
- Occupations: Auctioneer, television personality
- Years active: 1988–present
- Known for: Storage Wars
- Spouse: Dan Dotson
- Website: americanauctioneers.com

Laura Christine Dotson (née Payton, born May 13, 1968) is an American auctioneer who has been in the auctioneering business since 1988. She and her husband, Dan Dotson, run American Auctioneers, a full service auction company in Riverside, California. She is best known for being the auctioneer on A&E Network's Storage Wars.

== Early life ==
Dotson was raised in Thousand Oaks, California and became familiar with auctioneering, having been around the business since 1988.

== Career ==
=== American Auctioneers ===
In 1996, she met Dan Dotson, who later became her husband. She also became Dan's business partner and now is co-owner and manager of American Auctioneers. Dan Dotson started American Auctioneers in 1983.

American Auctioneers specializes in auctions of storage units, estates, business inventories and equipment, plus legal/foreclosure auctions, fundraisers and appraisals. Dotson averages two auctions a day, six days a week.

Dotson is also the owner of StorageAuctions.net, an internet portal focusing on providing self-storage auction listings throughout the United States and Canada.

=== Storage Wars ===
In December 2010, both Dotsons began appearing on A&E's Storage Wars, a reality series which follows four professional buyers and their teams as they bid on storage units that are in default. Ordinarily, she is the ringman and Dan acts as the auctioneer, but these roles are occasionally reversed (often at her request). Dan's auction chant on the show utilizes slurred multi-syllabic filler rattled out very quickly, while her auction chant uses more distinct filler words and therefore sounds slower than her husband's.

Her involvement in Storage Wars has led to her being featured in several news articles including The Washington Post, USA Today and TMZ. In 2015 Examiner.com reported that "Thom Beers came up with the idea for Storage Wars, but said that Dan and Laura Dotson inspired it."

== Television appearances ==
- Storage Wars - 2010 to present
- Happening Now - Dan and Laura discuss gold treasure found at auction
- Hot in Cleveland - Dan and Laura cameo in third season episode titled "Storage Wars"
- Fox & Friends - Dan and Laura are guests
- Anderson Live - Dan and Laura are guests on the episode along with Jimmy Fallon
- The Home and Family Show - Dan and Laura are guests
