= List of Storage Wars: New York episodes =

This is a list of episodes from the reality television series Storage Wars: New York, which airs on the cable network A&E Network. The episodes listed here are in a broadcast order, not production order. The series debuted on January 1, 2013. The descriptions of the items listed in this article reflect those given by their sellers and others in the episodes prior to their appraisal by experts as authentic or inauthentic, unless otherwise noted.

== Series overview ==
Season	Episodes	Originally released	
Season	Episodes	First released	Last released
1	6	January 1, 2013	January 15, 2013
2	20	July 9, 2013	November 8, 2013

== Episodes ==
=== Season 1 (2013) ===
No. overall	No. in season	Title	Location	Original release date	US viewers (millions)
1	1	"Beg, Borough, or Steal"	Brooklyn, NY	January 1, 2013	3.31
The buyers compete over some of New York's biggest and best rooms in Brooklyn, New York. Joe buys a unit for $1,500 containing much art and makes some serious profit. Candy and Courtney purchase a unit containing show boxes for $155 and finds a rare pair of dance shoes. Tad and Chris buy a room for $525, much to Chris's dismay, and find a vintage restaurant grill. Mike, "The Hustler", feels sick and goes home with nothing.
2	2	"Lady Luck Comes to Harlem"	Harlem, NY	January 1, 2013	3.31
The bidders travel to Harlem for the auction. Mike purchases a unit for $700 with some household items and has some agreeable profit. Courtney and Candy buy a room which has a biker's jacket for $125 and find a fur coat that's worth $3,000. Joe spends $225 on a room with clothes and some other merchandise and hoping to break even with his purchase. Chris and Tad head home empty handed.
3	3	"Straight Outta Connecticut"	Danbury, CT	January 8, 2013	3.09
The New Yorkers hope to uncover greener pastures in Danbury, Connecticut. Joe P. buys a unit for $2,500 containing many antiques and much furniture and scores big. Mike buys a unit for $300 with two sailboats and makes profit. Chris and Tad spend $1,000 with many household items. Courtney and Candy save their money for the next auction.
4	4	"The Shore Thing"	Brick, NJ	January 8, 2013	2.80
The buyers head up to an auction in Brick, New Jersey, but borderlines are drawn as the New York bargain hunters attempt to make a killing in New Jersey. Tad and Chris show the New Yorkers who's boss, they buy a unit for $325 containing much furniture, and also end up finding a gold watch that's worth getting excited about. Mike buys a room for $1,700 containing a construction equipment piece that he is hoping is worth something so he can make money. Courtney and Candy make a good profit on a low-price unit. Joe heads home with all his money, and purchases nothing.
5	5	"Long Island City of Dreams"	Long Island City, NY	January 15, 2013	2.49
The buyers look for bargains in Long Island City, New York. Tensions boil between the buyers as they're trying to obtain a good unit. Courtney and Candy buy a room for $185 with many boxes and find some old movie theater drive-in speakers. Joe sneaks away with a $1,000 unit filled with valuable antiques and collectibles and makes more than he thought and expected. Mike wins a $150 room and makes almost $5,000. Chris and Tad went home without a room.
6	6	"I've Got a Bridge to Sell You in Brooklyn"	Brooklyn, NY	January 15, 2013	2.42
The buyers take another crack at Brooklyn for some of the best quality rooms. Joe buys a room for $4,000 while trying to bid up the others, that Chris and Tad really wanted and finds out that there aren't that many good items in it after all. Candy and Courtney spend $800 on a man's unit containing much men's clothing and also find a safe. Mike gambles on a room and buys it for $375 and nearly doubles his investment. Chris and Tad are once again shut out by all the other buyers and go home with nothing.

=== Season 2 (2013) ===
No. overall	No. in season	Title	Location	Original release date	US viewers (millions)
7	1	"The Walking Bid"	Trenton, NJ	July 9, 2013	1.21
The bidders look for bargains in Trenton, New Jersey. Chris and Tad take a gamble on a $475 locker and encounter a vintage firework device. A new buyer named "Big Steve", who owns a massive flea market, enters the picture and purchases an $1,100 room on a unit containing gumball machines and receives a great amount of cash. Joe P. buys a room for $425 containing furniture, a few little mystery items, and then finds old vintage hearing aids. Mike and the team of Candy and Courtney don't purchase a unit at the auction.
8	2	"A Turtle Grows in Harlem"	Harlem, NY	July 9, 2013	1.54
All the buyers head to Harlem, New York all looking to score big on some great rooms. Joe P. spends $5,800 on one of the biggest rooms he has ever seen, containing many boxes and much furniture, and scores big. Mike purchases a woman's locker for $1,000 and explores his feminine side. Chris and Tad store recently got damaged from Hurricane Sandy and lost much money with merchandise and hope to have a fresh start. They purchase a unit for $1,100 and score top-grade literature. Courtney and Candy develop a new bidding strategy, and not much else.
9	3	"An Embarrassment of Richards"	Long Island City, NY	July 16, 2013	1.44
The bidders return to one their favorite facilities in Long Island City, New York. The facility is Moishe's Self Storage. Mike B goes head-to-head with new buyer Big Steve. Mike B. buys a unit for $925 and lands himself a load of nuclear fallout equipment. Joe P. continues his winning ways with his $1,600 containing many boxes with books and some furniture. Big Steve buys a unit for $200 containing bedroom furniture and encounter some cricket cages. The teams of Chris and Tad and Candy and Courtney don't buy any units.
10	4	"Hi-Text... Hi-Jinx"	Brooklyn, NY	July 16, 2013	1.37
The buyers return to Brooklyn, New York once again and everyone hopes to hit big-ticket items in the rooms. Joe P. lands state-of-the-art technology in his $350 unit he purchased. Chris and Tad try wine tasting. Candy and Courtney utilize a new bidding technique and score a $600 unit packed with dress forms and vintage clothing and do well.
11	5	"Da Bronx Tale"	Bronx, NY	July 23, 2013	1.17
The buyers visit Bronx, New York for the first time. Joe gets help from a friend. A remote device controls the fate of Mike B.
12	6	"Pig in a Puck"	Brooklyn, NY	July 23, 2013	1.32
The buyers hope to purchase some great rooms in Brooklyn, New York. Mike continues to be haunted by his Brooklyn curse. Candy and Courtney have trouble making ends meet. Chris and Tad visit the home of the New Jersey Devils. Joe has cased by purchase adventure.
13	7	"Legends of the Fog"	Brooklyn, NY	July 30, 2013	1.18
The buyers travel to Brooklyn, New York. Mike B. buys a unit for $165 and finally breaks his Brooklyn curse. A new buyer Todd scores some valuable vintage toys in his $1,100 unit. Chris and Tad are helped out by man's best friend.
14	8	"As the World Bids"	Long Island City, NY	July 30, 2013	1.16
The buyers head to Long Island City, New York for a vault auction. Mike B. scores a $2,000 vault by mistake while trying to bid up the other buyers and locates a pony he can actually ride. Joe P. buys 10 vaults for $2,500 and his vaults lands a picture-perfect buy for him. Candy and Courtney buy a vault for $550 with some nice household items and encounter a fancy Expresso maker. Chris and Tad throw out some bids, but end up with nothing in the end.
15	9	"The Forgotten Borough"	Staten Island, NY	August 6, 2013	1.27
Lockers are perused on Staten Island, New York. Candy and Courtney hunt for seasonal items. Mike B. seeks tidy scores that will fit in his truck. Big Steve wants a large volume of goods for his flea market. Meanwhile, Joe P. hopes to continue his hot streak.
16	10	"Snakes in a Locker"	Flatbush, NY	August 6, 2013	1.31
The buyers visit Flatbush, New York. The women decide to play dirty. Chris and Tad cannot see eye to eye. Mike B. hunts for shabby chic.
17	11	"School of Lock"	Edgewater, NJ	August 13, 2013	1.38
Joe P. schools the other buyers during a visit to Edgewater, New Jersey. Mike B. provides retail space for his wife. Chris and Tad follow their instincts.
18	12	"Breaking Bank"	Harlem, NY	August 13, 2013	1.47
Joe P. looks forward to a successful repeat visit to Harlem, New York. Candy and Courtney are in desperate need of goods for their shop. Mike B hopes to obtain a great amount of items he can quickly flip for cash.
19	13	"A Few Good Bids"	Newark, NJ	August 20, 2013	1.33
Chris and Tad seek old-money antiques in Newark, New Jersey. Candy and Courtney need to stock up for an upcoming sale. Mike B. watches out for commercial gear that can be easily flipped.
20	14	"Bidding in the Rain"	Bay Shore, NY	August 20, 2013	1.21
The buyers head to Long Island community of Bay Shore. Joe P. has a bright idea. Chris and Tad go big.
21	15	"East River Gold"	Brooklyn, NY	November 1, 2013	1.22
In this episode the buyers head back Brooklyn. Big Steve is desperate to fill his flea market shelves, having not made any purchases in weeks. Joe P hopes some vintage liquor will help him drown his sorrows, while Chris and Tad are looking for variety. Mike B has his usual lack of luck.
22	16	"Bid With a Bang"	Westchester County, NY	November 1, 2013	1.19
The buyers are hoping for luck in Westchester County. Joe P has scored some great antiques here in the past and is looking for more of the same. The girls look to go incognito, lowering their chances of being bid up. Mike B is in his own back yard and uses it to his advantage. New Buyer Todd, aka "The Fog", looks to make his presence felt.
23	17	"Auction Haunters"	Amityville, NY	November 8, 2013	1.38
In Amityville, Mike B thinks big by bringing his cube truck, knowing his shelves need restocking. Candy and Courtney do a little camera work of their own while looking for vintage. Joe P works on his golf swing and has some antiques checked out.
24	18	"Bid Master Funk"	Bushwick, NY	November 8, 2013	1.29
The buyers are ready to bid at a high-end facility in Bushwick. It's the end of the month and Mike B needs to stock up on merchandise. Big Steve hopes to climb into a new barber's chair and find any other man-cave type items, while Joe P looks to find his funk and some eclectic 60's and 70's style stuff. Chris and Tad look for raw materials needed to update new merchandise at their store.
25	19	"It Takes a Queen's Village"	Queens Village, NY	November 8, 2013	1.12
Hoping that Queens Village will treat them right, Chris and Tad are looking for industrial. Joe P knows Queens like the back of his hand having been there 52 years, so he has an idea what's in store for him. Candy and Courtney have a lot of cheddar and are looking to buy. Mike looks to take down Big Steve in a bidding war.
26	20	"Drags to Riches"	Wallabout, NY	November 8, 2013	1.20
In this episode, the gang hits an auction in Wallabout. Candy and Courtney look for clothing and are off to the races. Mike B knows he needs to move bulk on the hustlers scale. Big Steve attempts to climb his way into the green.

== Episodes statistics ==
=== Season 1 (2013) ===
No. in series	No. in season	Title	Air Date	Joe "P" Pauletich		Chris Morelli/ Tad Eaton		Candy Olsen/ Courtney Wagner		Mike Braiotta	
No. in series	No. in season	Title	Air Date	Spent	Net profit/loss	Spent	Net profit/loss	Spent	Net profit/loss	Spent	Net profit/loss
1	1	Beg, Borough, or Steal	January 1, 2013	$1,500.00	$16,450.00	$525.00	$1,250.00	$155.00	$10.00	N/A	N/A
2	2	Lady Luck Comes to Harlem	January 1, 2013	$225.00	$795.00	N/A	N/A	$125.00	$3,010.00	$700.00	$615.00
3	3	'Straight Outta Connecticut	January 8, 2013	$2,500.00	$5,015.00	$1,000.00	$105.00	N/A	N/A	$300.00	$800.00
4	4	'The Shore Thing	January 8, 2013	N/A	N/A	$325.00	$2,725.00	$25.00	$975.00	$1,700.00	$225.00
5	5	'Long Island City of Dreams	January 15, 2013	$1,000.00	$21,200.00	N/A	N/A	$185.00	$60.00	$150.00	$4,768.00
6	6	'I've Got a Bridge to Sell You in Brooklyn	January 15, 2013	$4,000.00	-$2,875.00	N/A	N/A	$800.00	$1,620.00	$375.00	$325.00
		Totals:		$9,225.00	$40,585.00	$1,850.00	$4,080.00	$1,290.00	$5,675.00	$3,225.00	$6,733.00

=== Season 2 (2013) ===
No. in series	No. in season	Title	Air Date	Joe "P" Pauletich		Chris Morelli/ Tad Eaton		Candy Olsen/ Courtney Wagner		Mike Braiotta	
No. in series	No. in season	Title	Air Date	Spent	Net profit/loss	Spent	Net profit/loss	Spent	Net profit/loss	Spent	Net profit/loss
7	1	"The Walking Bid"	July 9, 2013	$425.00	$517.00	$475.00	-$380.00	N/A	N/A	N/A	N/A
8	2	"A Turtle Grows in Harlem"	July 9, 2013	$5,800.00	$10,880.00	$1,100.00	$6,165.00	N/A	N/A	$1,000.00	-$25.00
9	3	"An Embarrassment of Richards"	July 16, 2013	$1,600.00	$3,250.00	N/A	N/A	N/A	N/A	$925.00	$4,425.00
10	4	"Hi-Text ... Hi-Jinx"	July 16, 2013	$350.00	$2,050.00	$285.00	-$34.00	$600.00	$1,390.00	N/A	N/A
11	5	"Da Bronx Tale"	July 23, 2013	$350.00	$4,300.00	N/A	N/A	$350.00	$1,330.00; See notes	$125.00	$890.00
12	6	"Pig in a Puck"	July 23, 2013	$450.00	$1,800.00	$425.00	$375.00	$450.00	-$250.00	N/A	N/A
13	7	"Legends of the Fog"	July 30, 2013	N/A	N/A	$125.00	$767.00	See notes^{1}		$165.00	$560.00
14	8	"As the World Bids"	July 30, 2013	$2,500.00	$13,350.00	N/A	N/A	$550.00	$780.00	$2,000.00	$980.00
15	9	"The Forgotten Borough"	August 6, 2013	$1,700.00	-$565.00	See notes^{2}		N/A	N/A	$300.00	$487.00
16	10	"Snakes in a Locker"	August 6, 2013	$425.00	$350.00	N/A	N/A	$600.00	-$290.00	$1,100.00	-$124.00
17	11	"School of Lock"	August 13, 2013	N/A	N/A	$1,700.00	-$700.00	$525.00	$440.00	$1,300.00	$1,130.00
18	12	"Breaking Bank"	August 13, 2013	$2,200.00	$15,050.00	$2,200.00	$16,700.00	$1,100.00	$5,658.00	N/A	N/A
19	13	"A Few Good Bids"	August 20, 2013	N/A	N/A	$500.00	$880.00	$1,800.00	$110.00	$600.00	$12,660.00
20	14	"Bidding in the Rain"	August 20, 2013	N/A	N/A	$1,600.00	$1,450.00	$450.00	-$60.00	$275.00	$2,491.00
21	15	"East River Gold"	November 1, 2013	$1,100.00	-$580.00	$550.00	$690.00	N/A	N/A	N/A	N/A
22	16	"Bid with a Bang"	November 1, 2013	$4,100.00	$5,360.00	See notes^{3}		$2,300.00	$4,150.00	$2,000.00	$3,075.00
23	17	"Auction Haunters"	November 8, 2013	$500.00	$285.00	See notes^{4}		$1,700.00	$1,160.00	$900.00	$338.00
24	18	"Bid Master Funk"	November 8, 2013	N/A	N/A	$750.00	$1,700.00	N/A	N/A	$2,400.00	-$1,940.00
25	19	"It Takes A Queen's Village"	November 8, 2013	N/A	N/A	$600.00	$780.00	$2,500.00	-$929.00	$3,200.00	$265.00
26	20	"Drags To Riches"	November 8, 2013	$5,200.00	$159,300.00	N/A	N/A	$1,200.00	$360.00	N/A	N/A
		Totals:		$26,350.00	$215,347.00	$10,310.00	$28,393.00	$14,125.00	$13,707.00	$16,290.00	$24,947.00

=== Other notes ===
- In "The Walking Bid" episode, Big Steve spent $1,100 and profited $1,600.
- In "An Embarrassment of Richards" episode, Big Steve spent $200 and profited $1,150.
- In "Da Bronx Tale" episode, Joe P. and The Fog worked as a team. Additionally, Candy and Courtney's profit in this episode represents their take from a pop up sale they staged, not from an item appraisal, as the only item of worth in their room was the gumball machine.
- In "Legends of the Fog" episode, The Fog spent $1,100 and profited $2,630. Candy and Courtney did not appear in this episode.
- In "The Forgotten Borough" episode, Big Steve spent $675 and profited $1,300. Chris and Tad did not appear in this episode.
- In "East River Gold" episode, Big Steve spent $900 and profited $740.
- In "Bid with a Bang" episode, The Fog did not buy a locker. Chris and Tad did not appear in this episode.
- In "Bid Master Funk" episode, Big Steve spent $1,000 and profited $425.
- In "It Takes A Queen's Village" episode, Big Steve did not buy a locker.
- In "Drags To Riches" episode, Big Steve spent $1,200 and profited $122. Big Steve's season finished with him spending $5,075 and profiting $5,337.
