= Ivy Calvin =

American football player and TV personality

Profile
- Position: Linebacker / Fullback

Personal information
- Born: September 10, 1971 (age 55); Ridgecrest, California, U.S.
- Listed height: 6 ft 0 in (1.83 m)
- Listed weight: 240 lb (109 kg)

Career information
- High school: Sherman E. Burroughs (Ridgecrest, California)
- College: Bakersfield College (1990–1991); Cal State-Northridge (1992–1993)
- NFL draft: 1994: undrafted

Career history
- San Jose SaberCats (1995)

Career AFL statistics
- Rushing yards: 75
- Rushing TDs: 1
- Receiving yards: 33
- Receiving TDs: 0
- Tackles: 4
- Stats at ArenaFan.com

Other information
Ivy Calvin
Mixed martial arts record
- Total: 1
- Wins: 1
- By knockout: 0
- By submission: 1
- By decision: 0
- Losses: 0
- By knockout: 0
- By submission: 0
- By decision: 0
- No contests: 0
Other information
- Spouse: Wendy (m. 2014)
- Children: 2

Ivy Lammar Calvin (born September 10, 1971) is an American former professional football fullback, linebacker and mixed martial artist who played for the San Jose SaberCats of the Arena Football League in 1995. He is perhaps best known as for being on the main cast of A&E's Storage Wars since 2012.

== Early life ==
Calvin was born in Ridgecrest, California, and started playing American football at the age of 6. Calvin attended Burroughs High School, where he played both football and wrestling.

== College career ==
Calvin played for the Bakersfield Renegades in 1990 and 1991. He transferred to Cal State-Northridge Matadors where he played in 1992 and 1993.

== Professional career ==
Calvin went undrafted in 1994 and was signed with the San Jose SaberCats of the Arena Football League on April 14, 1995. Calvin played with the SaberCats for seven games and racking up 75 rushing yards and a rushing touchdown, along with 33 receiving yards and no touchdowns and 4 tackles. Calvin was released by the SaberCats on July 5, 1995.

Year	Games	Rushing				Receiving				Tackles
Year	GP	Att	Yds	Avg	TD	Rec	Yds	Avg	TD	Cmb
1995	7	25	70	2.8	1	2	33	16.5	0	4
Career	7	25	70	2.8	1	2	33	16.5	0	4

== Mixed martial arts career ==
Calvin faced off only once, against Samu on July 30, 2002, and won via submission.

== Mixed martial arts record ==
Professional record breakdown
1 match	1 win	0 losses
By submission	1	0

Res.	Record	Opponent	Method	Event	Date	Round	Time	Location	Notes
Win	1–0	Samu	Submission (keylock)	UAGF 2	July 30, 2002	1	1:22	Hollywood, California, U.S.	

== Post-mixed martial arts career ==
After being waived by the SaberCats, Calvin entered the business of buying storage lockers in 2008 and opened his store Grandma's Attic in 2009. He then joined the cast of A&E's series Storage Wars in 2012 as a recurring storage unit buyer during the show's third and fourth seasons before becoming a regular cast member since the fifth season, on which he is sometimes known as the "King of Palmdale" and "King of Lancaster".

== Personal life ==
Calvin married his wife, Wendy, in 1996. He has two children, Ivy Calvin Jr. (born 1998) and Isaiah Calvin (born 2000).
