= Dave Hester =

American auctioneer and TV personality (born 1964)

- Born: David Hester; July 23, 1964 (age 62); Marine Corps Base Camp Pendleton, near Oceanside, California, U.S.
- Other name: The Mogul
- Occupations: Auctioneer, television personality
- Years active: 1992–present
- Known for: Storage Wars
- Website: davehesterauctioneer.com

David Hester Sr. (born July 23, 1964) is an American auctioneer and TV personality who has been in the auctioneering business since 1992. He runs Dave Hester Auctions, a full service auction company in Santa Ana, California. He is best known for being a main participant on A&E's Storage Wars.

== Early life ==
David Hester was born on July 23, 1964, at the Marine Corps Base Camp Pendleton, near Oceanside, California. His parents started getting into buying storage lockers after his father's return from Vietnam in 1969. Hester started attending auctions in 1978, eventually leading him to the self-storage auction business in 1986. He started auctioneering at a local auction house in 1992.

== Career ==
=== Stores and Dave Hester Auctions ===
Hester opened two stores, the Newport Consignment Gallery and Rags to Riches Thrift Store, located in Costa Mesa, California, in 2003. They ceased operations in 2012, when Hester started his online business, Dave Hester Auctions, rather owning his own warehouse based in Santa Ana. He still offers auctioneering services in Southern California to this day.

=== Storage Wars ===
Hester has been an on-and-off main participant on A&E's Storage Wars since 2010. He was fired by the show at the end of season 3 after claiming it was staged and filing a lawsuit against Storage War's parent company Original Productions, in December 2012. He came back after the lawsuit was settled in July 2014. He remained on the show until the end of season 12, in 2019, when he once again left, this time due to health issues. Hester once again returned to the show in 2025, in season 16.

== Lawsuits ==
=== Hester v. Tremaine Neverson (2011) ===
Tremaine Neverson, also known as Trey Songz sued Hester on November 14, 2011 over Hester using his phrase "YUUUP!" Hester argued that Songz' version "resembles an animal-like or non-human squeal which begins with a distinct 'yeeee' sound before finishing with a squeal-like 'uuuup' sound." And that its "distinct and different from Hester's more monosyllabic sounding guttural auction bidding phrase, which is meant to convey the meaning of 'yes.'" The lawsuit was mutually settled out of court in June 2012, with both Neverson and Hester continuing to use the phrase.

=== Hester v. Original Productions, LLC. (2012) ===
Hester originally filed against Original Productions, the parent company of Storage Wars in December 2012, after being fired by them. He claimed that the company intentionally planted items in lockers and "rigging them" before auctioning them off. He filed a lawsuit for $750,000, and in March 2013, the judge ruled partially in Original Productions favor, stating that Hester's claim of unfair business practices were alleged and violated Original Productions first amendment rights. Hester had to pay nearly $123,000 to cover Original Productions costs. However, in September 2013, Hester partially won as a judge denied Original Productions to throw out the entire lawsuit, stating that Hester's wrongful termination lawsuit had enough merit to move forward in the trial. Instead of going to trial however, both Original Productions and Hester reached an agreement, which was never disclosed to the public. Hester came back to the show for season 5 in 2014.

=== Hester v. Public Storage (2017) ===
Hester originally filed against Public Storage in August 2017 following a cancelled auction. While at one of Public Storage's auctions, he bought a storage locker for nearly $12,000. Shortly after, one of the employees realized that the person who owned the locker had actually paid for the locker weeks prior, and it was a mistake in their computer system. Public Storage offered a full refund to Hester, but Hester refused, rather suing for breach of contract. In June 2018, Public Storage requested most of the claims in the lawsuit to be thrown out. On May 28, 2020, the California Fourth District Court of Appeal sided with Public Storage that the "null and void" clauses in the auction sign-in sheets Hester signed legally allowed Public Storage to void the sale for any reason before the goods were removed.

== Personal life ==
Hester has a son, Dave Jr., and has a grandchild. In November 2018, Hester suffered a hemorrhagic stroke brought on by sleep apnea and hypertension. He spent multiple days in the ICU, and despite having to learn basic tasks again, made a full recovery by the end of 2019.
