= Country Bucks =

American reality television series

- Genre: Reality
- Country of origin: United States
- Original language: English
- No. of seasons: 2
- No. of episodes: 14

Production
- Running time: 21 minutes
- Production company: Matador Content

Original release
- Network: A&E
- Release: November 19, 2014 – July 8, 2015

Country Bucks (stylized as Country Buck$) is an American reality television series. The series premiered on November 19, 2014, on A&E.

== Series overview ==
Season	Episodes	Originally released	
Season	Episodes	First released	Last released
1	8	November 19, 2014	December 10, 2014
2	6	June 24, 2015	July 8, 2015

== Episodes ==
=== Season 1 (2014) ===
No. overall	No. in season	Title	Original release date	US viewers (millions)
1	1	"Sac-Attack"	November 19, 2014	N/A
2	2	"Fishing Crossbow"	November 26, 2014	N/A
3	3	"Double Trouble"	November 26, 2014	N/A
4	4	"Zipline"	November 26, 2014	N/A
5	5	"Jason Aldean"	December 3, 2014	N/A
6	6	"Hard Luck Camo"	December 3, 2014	N/A
7	7	"Superdome"	December 10, 2014	N/A
8	8	"Recipe for Disaster"	December 10, 2014	N/A

=== Season 2 (2015) ===
No. overall	No. in season	Title	Original release date	US viewers (millions)
9	1	"Spring Breakers"	June 24, 2015	N/A
10	2	"Pitch Please!"	June 24, 2015	N/A
11	3	"Urine or Ur-Out"	July 1, 2015	N/A
12	4	"Stand of Brothers"	July 1, 2015	N/A
13	5	"Bachelor Bucks"	July 8, 2015	N/A
14	6	"Landry vs Busbice"	July 8, 2015	N/A
