= Storage Wars Canada =

- Also known as: Storage Wars: Northern Treasures
- Genre: Reality
- Starring: Don Reinhart; Ursula Stolff; Paul Kenny; Bogart Kenny; Rick Coffill; Cindy Hayden; Roy Dirnbeck
- Narrated by: Martin Yap
- Theme music composer: Andy Kubiszewski
- Opening theme: "Money Owns This Town"
- Country of origin: Canada
- Original language: English
- No. of seasons: 2
- No. of episodes: 48 (list of episodes)

Production
- Executive producers: Guy O'Sullivan; Allison Grace; Geoff Siskind
- Running time: 21 to 22 minutes
- Production companies: Proper Television, Fremantle, Rogers Media

Original release
- Network: OLN
- Release: August 29, 2013 – March 26, 2015

Related
- Storage Wars: New York

Storage Wars Canada is a Canadian reality television series on OLN that aired from 2013 to 2015. The series followed a group of buyers looking to strike it big by buying storage units at auctions when rent is not paid. It was the first international version of the Storage Wars franchise.

Storage Wars Canada was announced on April 3, 2013, with production beginning the following month. The first season consisting of 36 episodes was initially previewed at Fan Expo 2013 before premiering on OLN on August 29, 2013.

In May 2017, the show began airing on A&E in the United States as Storage Wars: Northern Treasures.

== Participants ==
=== Buyers ===
- Roy Dirnbeck - "The Instigator": Owns an established courier business, and looks to buy storage lockers as a hobby. He's known to spend big, and win a locker at any cost. Characterized by an aggressively inflated sense of self, Roy is known to express his insecurities towards others through his behavior which is at times cruel, immature, and downright vulgar.
- Ursula Stolf - "The Knock Out": New to the auction system, Ursula sells luxury items out of her online store. Initially dismissed by the other buyers, Ursula intends to prove them wrong and show them that she's a serious contender. Her catchphrase after she buys a locker is "And that's how it's done!"
- Cindy Hayden & Rick Coffill - "The Veterans": 15 year veterans to the auction business, Cindy and Rick are looking for antiques to fill their store in Newmarket, Ontario called Storage Treasures.
- Paul & Bogart Kenny - "The High Roller and The Kid": Paul's been a poker player for over 30 years, and has decided to turn his side business of flipping the contents of storage lockers into a steady business with his son Bogart by opening a new store. Paul & Bogart often argue over whose "strategy" works the best. Paul is the owner of Toronto Gold Silver & Coin.

=== Other cast members ===
- Don Reinhart: The show's auctioneer, with 48 years of experience. Don has auctioned off everything from smashed up cars to houses, his hometown is Caledon, Ontario.
- Martin Yap: Narrator of the show, Yap provides a quick explanation of the show's premise at the beginning, and does a recap of the featured buyers' profits or losses at the end of each episode.

== Opening ==
As with the other shows in the franchise, the narrator (played by Martin Yap) sets the scene for the series: "When storage units are abandoned, in the Great White North, the treasures within go up for auction." This is followed by the preview of that night's episode. In the opening titles that follow a re-arranged version of the Storage Wars theme, "Money Owns This Town", performed by Bedtracks plays.
