= Profiles (TV series) =

Canadian biographical television miniseries

- Genre: Biography
- Country of origin: Canada
- Original language: English
- No. of seasons: 1
- No. of episodes: 5

Production
- Executive producer: Cam Cathcart
- Producer: Geoff Hussey

Original release
- Network: CBC Television
- Release: 27 December 1979 – 16 April 1980

Profiles is a Canadian biographical television miniseries that aired on CBC Television from 1979 to 1980.

== Premise ==
Various personalities featured in this mini-series.

== Scheduling ==
The five episodes of the mini-series were broadcast approximately monthly at random times between 27 December 1979 and 16 April 1980.

== Episodes ==
- Eric Arthur (architect-writer), hosted by June Callwood
- Douglas Crozier (medicine), hosted by Joe Coté
- Walter Kenyon (archaeologist), hosted by Joe Coté
- Madelaine Parent (union movement), hosted by Sharon Dunn
