= Attic Gold =

Television series

- Genre: Reality
- Presented by: Eric Myers
- Composer: Jingle Punks
- Country of origin: United States
- Original language: English
- No. of seasons: 1
- No. of episodes: 6

Production
- Executive producers: Alan LaGarde; Sumithrin David
- Producer: James Gagliano
- Editors: Ken Wonderland; Jennifer Carlton
- Running time: 30 minutes
- Production companies: Paper Route Productions, LLC

Original release
- Network: DIY Network
- Release: August 31 – September 13, 2015

Related
- Garage Gold

Attic Gold is a television series airing on the DIY Network. The show follows Eric Myers and his family-owned business Junk, Junk, Baby! out of Ipswich, Massachusetts, which offers "clean-outs" of any attic or other space free of charge, but just as long as they can recycle, re-purpose and re-sell any valuables they find in the process. After the job is done, they turn the attic into a usable room for their clients. The show airs on Sunday nights at 9:00 p.m. EST

== Premise ==
Opening Introduction:

Narrator: This is New England. Full of old homes and attics packed with junk. A husband and wife, and their crew clean them out for free. But whatever they bring down, they get to keep. I'm Eric Meyers and I do the picking. My wife, Michelle appraises the items. And my crew (Bones and Bull) does the heavy lifting. Our goal--find the gems buried in all this junk and turn top-floor disasters into...Attic Gold.

== Crew ==
- Eric Myers - Boss & Brains
- Michelle Myers - Appraiser
- Dennis "The Bull" - Heavy Lifter & Smasher
- Leeland "No Bones" Jones - The Muscle
