= Accused: Guilty or Innocent =

American true crime television series

Accused: Guilty or Innocent? is a true crime documentary series that provides an intimate look at what happens when individuals are formally charged with serious crimes and face trial. The show presents each case exclusively from the perspective of the accused, their legal team and their family members.

The first episode premiered on April 21, 2020 on A+E TV. As of 2025, the show has released seven seasons. The show is produced by Brinkworth Productions.

A spin-off called Accused: Did I do it? Was announced in March 2025.
