= Barry'd Treasure =

- Genre: Reality
- Starring: Barry Weiss
- Country of origin: United States
- Original language: English
- No. of seasons: 1
- No. of episodes: 8

Production
- Executive producers: Brad Holcman; Drew Tappon; Fred Grinstein; Jeff Bumgarner; Jeff Conroy; Philip D. Segal; Thom Beers
- Producer: Dolph Scott
- Running time: 21–22 minutes
- Production company: Original Productions

Original release
- Network: A&E
- Release: March 18 – May 6, 2014

Barry'd Treasure is an American reality television series airing on A&E. The series premiered on March 18, 2014, and starred Barry Weiss in a spin-off of A&E's Storage Wars. The series centered around Weiss (at the time formerly a featured storage locker buyer on Storage Wars, though he has since rejoined the cast) as he traveled around the United States to find rare antiques and collectibles. The show also featured some of Weiss' previous Storage Wars sidekicks as they accompanied him on some of his travels.

== Episodes ==
No.	Title	Original release date	Prod. code	U.S. viewers (millions)
1	"The Candyman Can't"	March 18, 2014	103	1.87
2	"Kentuckyana Jones and the Emperor's Vessel"	March 25, 2014	102	1.70
3	"Big Vice Country"	April 1, 2014	105	1.73
4	"Birthday on the Bayou"	April 8, 2014	106	1.25
5	"Show Me the Monkey"	April 15, 2014	101	1.51
6	"The Unbearable Enlightenment of Barry"	April 29, 2014	104	1.48
7	"Blackman and Robin"	April 29, 2014	107	1.26
8	"All About Evel"	May 6, 2014	108	0.89
