= Storage Wars =

American reality television series

- Genre: Reality
- Starring: Dave Hester; Darrell Sheets; Brandon Sheets; Jarrod Schulz; Brandi Passante; Barry Weiss; Dan Dotson; Laura Dotson; Ivy Calvin; Rene Nezhoda; Casey Lloyd; Mary Padian; Kenny Crossley; Emily Wears; Shana Dahan; Edwina Registre; Justin Bryant; Lisa Delarios; Dusty Riach; Lupe Riach; Emily Pokoj
- Narrated by: Thom Beers
- Theme music composer: Andy Kubiszewski
- Opening theme: "Money Owns This Town"
- Country of origin: United States
- Original language: English
- No. of seasons: 18
- No. of episodes: 368 (list of episodes)

Production
- Executive producers: Robert Sharenow; Elaine Frontain Bryant; Thom Beers; Philip D. Segal
- Producer: Dolph Scott
- Running time: 30 minutes (2010–2024); 60 minutes (2025–present)
- Production company: Original Productions; Fremantle; A+E Networks; Trifecta Entertainment & Media (syndication)

Original release
- Network: A&E
- Release: December 1, 2010 – present

Promo for Storage Wars

Storage Wars (stylized as STORAGE WAR$) is an American reality television competition series that airs on the A&E network. It premiered on December 1, 2010. The 18th season premiered on May 30, 2026.

If rent is not paid on a storage locker for 36 days in California, the contents can be sold by an auctioneer as a single lot of items in the form of an auction. The show follows professional buyers who visit storage facilities throughout the state and bid on these lockers. Before each locker is auctioned, the buyers are given five minutes to inspect the contents from the doorway, but may not enter the locker or touch any of the items.

After the day's auctions are completed, the winning bidders sort through the lockers, estimating the prices they will set on the contents and/or consulting with experts for an appraisal of unusual items. Running totals on-screen display the cost versus the estimated total value, and a final tally at the end of the episode summarizes the buyers' net profit or loss.

== History ==
Title card used for the first two seasons

Previous title card, which debuted with the 3rd season

Thom Beers is the executive producer and narrator of the show. He provides a quick explanation of the show's premise at the beginning and does a recap of the featured buyers' profits or losses at the end of each episode. He has stated that the series avoids delving into behind-the-scenes stories of the lockers' original owners because "all you see is misery there, and I didn't want to trade on that". In the United States, Storage Wars premiered on A&E on December 1, 2010.

Season one of Storage Wars consisted of 19 episodes, 17 of which were filmed at various self-storage facilities throughout Southern California. The show enjoyed ratings success, and its second-season premiere attracted 5.1 million total viewers, making it the most-watched program in A&E's history to that point.

Storage Wars was recommissioned for another 26-episode season, which premiered on June 5, 2012. Only 20 of the 26 episodes were aired however, with six of the episodes being held back for broadcast during the second half of the show's 3rd season which began airing on December 4, 2012.

Storage Wars concluded its 12th season on January 30, 2019, and there initially was no news regarding a season renewal. A 13th season was eventually announced in March 2021 and premiered on April 20. Season 14 premiered on November 2, 2021, with Barry Weiss returning as a buyer, after departing the series in 2013 during season 4.

Season 15 aired 24 episodes and concluded on August 15, 2023. A 16th season premiered on June 7, 2025, with the series transitioning to an hour-long format. The season includes the return of buyer Dave Hester, absent since the conclusion of season 12.

=== Spin-offs ===
Several spin-off series were also produced, most of them airing on A&E:

- Storage Wars: Texas (2011–14)
- Storage Wars: New York (2013)
- Storage Wars: Canada (originally aired on OLN from 2013 to 2015; re-runs aired as Storage Wars: Northern Treasures on A&E)
- Barry'd Treasure (2014)
- Brandi & Jarrod: Married to the Job (2014)
- Storage Wars: Miami (2015)
- Storage Wars France: Enchères surprises (aired on 6ter)
- Storage Wars: Barry’s Best Buys (2016)

== Participants ==
Name	Known As	Spinoff	Occupation	Seasons																	
Name	Known As	Spinoff	Occupation	1	2	3	4	5	6	7	8	9	10	11	12	13	14	15	16	17	18
Dave Hester	The Mogul	—N/a	Buyer	Main				Main											Main		
Darrell Sheets	The Gambler	—N/a	Buyer	Main																	
Brandon Sheets (Note: Brandon Sheets is Darrell's son.)	The Sidebet	—N/a	Buyer	Main																	
Jarrod Schulz (Note: In the season 13 premiere, Jarrod and Brandi, having broken up, bid separately.)	The Young Guns	Brandi & Jarrod: Married to the Job	Buyers	Main																	
Brandi Passante	The Young Guns	Brandi & Jarrod: Married to the Job	Buyers	Main																	
Barry Weiss	The Collector	Barry'd Treasure	Buyer	Main													Main				
Dan and Laura Dotson	American Auctioneers	—N/a	Auctioneers	Main																	
Ivy Calvin	The King	—N/a	Buyer			Recurring		Main													
Rene and Casey Nezhoda (Note: Casey Nezhoda would be a semi-regular cast member. Rene Nezhoda often attended the storage auctions by himself. However, Rene Nezhoda brought his father Gunter along in some episodes.)	The Bargain Hunters	—N/a	Buyers				Recurring	Main													
Mary Padian	The Junkster	Storage Wars: Texas	Buyer					Main												Main	
Kenny Crossley	—N/a	—N/a	Buyer		Recurring								Main								
Emily Wears	—N/a	—N/a	Auctioneer										Main								
Shana Dahan and Edwina Registre	The Vegas Ladies	—N/a	Buyers											Main							
Justin Bryant	The Rookie	—N/a	Buyer											Main							
Lisa Delarios	—N/a	—N/a	Buyer													Recurring			Main		
Dusty Riach	—N/a	—N/a	Buyer														Recurring		Main		
Lupe Riach	—N/a	—N/a	Buyer															Recurring	Main		
Emily Pokoj	—N/a	—N/a	Buyer																	Main	
Mark Balelo	Rico Suavé	—N/a	Buyer		Recurring																
Nabila Haniss	Paris Hilton	—N/a	Buyer		Recurring																
Jeff Jarred	—N/a	—N/a	Buyer			Recurring															
Herb Brown and Mike Karlinger	The Tank Top Twins	—N/a	Buyer			Recurring															
Mark and Matt Harris	The Harris Brothers	—N/a	Buyers			Recurring															
Earl and Johan Graham	—N/a	—N/a	Auctioneers				Recurring														
Mavrick Harvey	—N/a	—N/a	Buyer							Recurring											

=== Main buyers ===
==== Dave Hester ====
Dave Hester
- Other name: The Mogul
- Years active: 2010–2012, 2014–2019, 2025–

David Hester, also known as The Mogul (seasons 1–3; seasons 5–12; season 16–): At the start of the series, Hester owned Newport Consignment Gallery in Costa Mesa, California and the Rags to Riches thrift store, but closed them in June 2011. He now operates his own auction house, Dave Hester Auctions. Hester has had confrontations with the other main buyers, especially Darrell and Brandon Sheets, and is known to frequently raise bids when somebody else wants to buy a storage unit. Hester's son Dave Jr. occasionally appeared on the show with him. Dave Hester's signature catchword is a loud "YUUUP!" when making a bid. He has this word imprinted on his trucks, T-shirts, and hats. Hester's call originated from him being a bid-catcher in auction facilities, helping auctioneers spot bidders in a crowd. In December 2012, Hester was fired from the show, and sued the show's producers for wrongful termination; part of his lawsuit was tossed out in March 2013. Hester did not appear in season 4 but returned for season 5.

==== Darrell Sheets ====
Darrell Sheets
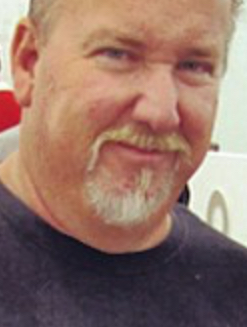
- Sheets at the Frieze Art Fair New York in 2013
- Born: May 13, 1958; California, U.S.
- Died: April 22, 2026 (aged 67); Lake Havasu City, Arizona, U.S.
- Other name: The Gambler
- Years active: 2010–2023

Darrell Sheets (May 13, 1958 – April 22, 2026), also known as The Gambler (seasons 1–15): A storage auction veteran from San Diego. His catchphrase was "This is the WOW factor!" and he made the occasional malapropism. He made his living by selling items from his purchased lockers at his weekly swap meet, and through his online store. In an interview, Sheets indicated that some of his biggest finds in lockers included a sizable comic book collection, four drawings by Pablo Picasso, and a letter written by Abraham Lincoln that sold for over US$15,000. Darrell was often accompanied by his son Brandon, also known as The Sidebet. In later seasons, Brandon attended auctions on his own and also bid against his father for the same units.

In the season-two special "Unlocked: Sell High", Darrell revealed that he once found a plastic-wrapped human corpse in a storage locker. It was determined that the previous owner of the locker had murdered his wife and left her in the unit. In the season three finale, Darrell bought a locker for $3,600, which was discovered to have contained many pieces of original artwork by Frank Gutierrez. The artwork wound up being appraised for approximately $300,000, resulting in the biggest profit in the show's history.

After dealing with congestive heart failure, Sheets suffered a mild heart attack in 2019, he retired from the show and moved to Lake Havasu City, Arizona to operate the antique shop Havasu Show Me Your Junk. However, he made guest appearances up until season 15 in 2023. Sheets was found dead on April 22, 2026, with an apparent self-inflicted gunshot wound to the head at his home in Lake Havasu. There were no drugs found in his system when he died as the toxicology report came back as negative. Prior to his death, Sheets left a suicide note alleging that he was being cyberbullied.

==== Jarrod Schulz and Brandi Passante ====
Jarrod Schulz and Brandi Passante
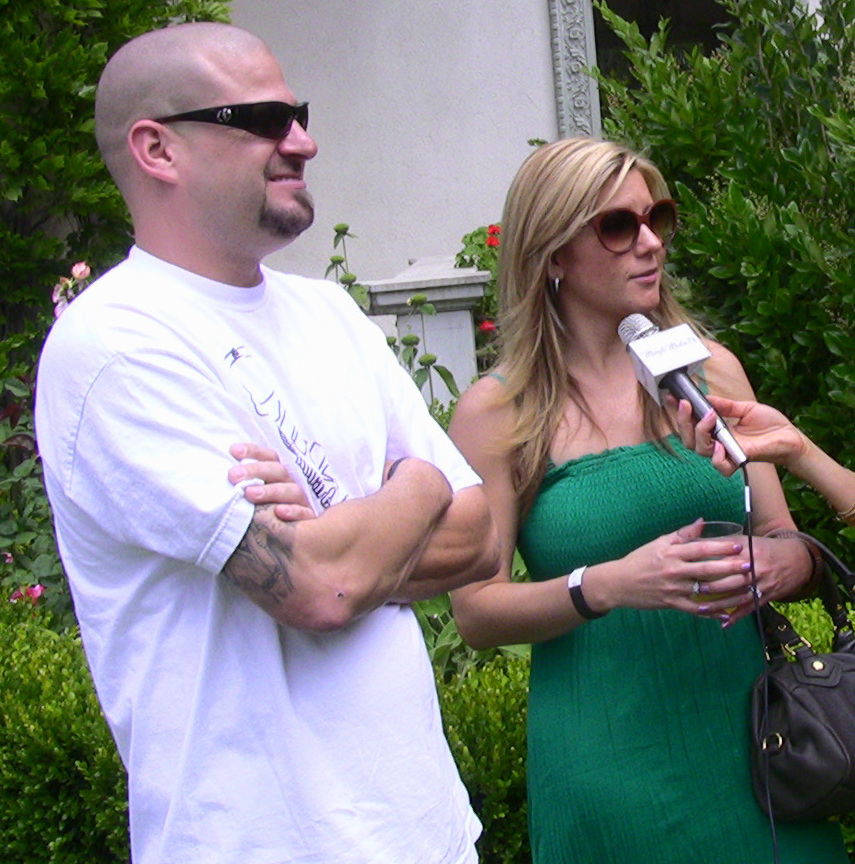
- Schulz and Passante in 2011
- Other name: The Young Guns
- Years active: 2010–2021 (Jarrod Schulz) 2010–present (Brandi Passante)

Jarrod Schulz (seasons 1—13) and Brandi Passante (seasons 1—), also known as The Young Guns: At the start of the series, Schulz and Passante owned and operated the Now and Then thrift store in Orange, California. In the fourth season, they opened a second location in Long Beach, California, but in the premiere of season 5, it was revealed that the Long Beach store had not made a profit since opening day, putting the pair in financial jeopardy. The Long Beach store is shown to have closed during the opening segment of the episode aired on April 8, 2014. Their Orange store also permanently closed in early 2016. On April 24, 2014, A&E premiered the special Brandi & Jarrod: Married to the Job, which focuses on the two balancing running their business and raising their two children. The special led to a spin-off series of the same name, premiering on August 12, 2014. Though identified on-screen as husband and wife in some episodes, Schulz and Passante have never actually been married. They have two children, Cameron and Payton. In the season 13 premiere, it is revealed that Jarrod and Brandi had broken up, but they then continued to bid separately.

==== Barry Weiss ====
Barry Weiss
- Other name: The Collector
- Years active: 2010–2013, 2022–2023

Barry Weiss, also known as The Collector (seasons 1–4; season 14–15): Weiss and his brother owned a successful produce company until he retired. Weiss is a lifelong antiques collector, but he had never bought a storage unit until his friend and Storage Wars executive producer and narrator Thom Beers suggested that he join the show. On June 25, 2013, it was reported that Weiss would not return to the show for season 5 and that he was leaving the series. In February 2014, A&E announced that Weiss would be starring in his own spin-off series, titled Barry'd Treasure. Weiss is godfather to Jesse James, the customizer and firearms manufacturer. He is also the "official spokesperson" and "brand ambassador" for Sherwood Valley Casino in Willits, California. He returned in season 14 as a regular on the first episode.

==== Ivy Calvin ====
Ivy Calvin
- Other name: The King
- Years active: 2012–present

Ivy Calvin, also known as The King (seasons 3–): Calvin joined the show during season 3 just after Dave Hester's departure, and became one of the main buyers during season 5. A former mixed martial arts (MMA) fighter and arena football player, he owns the Grandma's Attic thrift store in Palmdale, California. Calvin's son, Ivy Jr., often joins him on the show. Calvin also often teams up with Mary Padian, whom he refers to as his "BFF".

==== Rene Nezhoda and Casey Nezhoda ====
Rene Nezhoda
- Born: Germany (Rene)
- Other name: The Bargain Hunters
- Years active: 2013–2025

'Rene Nezhoda’ and Casey Nezhoda, also known as The Bargain Hunters (seasons 4-16): The husband-and-wife team joined the show during season 4, and became main buyers in season 5. A native of Germany, Rene owned the Bargain Hunters thrift store in Poway, California, near San Diego until its closing in 2021. As of the eleventh season, Casey only appears as a semi-regular cast member, with Rene often attending the auctions by himself. They have one child, Tatiana, who has accompanied both parents on several episodes between her teenage and college age years.

==== Mary Padian ====
Mary Padian
- Born: Texas, U.S.
- Other name: The Junkster
- Years active: 2012–2021, 2026-present

Mary Padian, also known as The Junkster (seasons 5–13, 17-present): A former regular of the spin-off series Storage Wars: Texas, Padian joined the cast in season 5, appearing in three episodes while on a visit to Long Beach in January 2014. In the sixth season, Padian became a main buyer. Mary Padian is the proprietor of Mary's Finds, an antique and furniture restoration business. Several episodes have shown Padian restoring items taken from the units she has purchased, through to the sale to the intended buyer. Padian is close friends with Ivy Calvin, who she often calls "BFF". In season 12, she teams up with Jenny Grumbles, a former Storage Wars: Texas buyer, to purchase a unit. In season 13, Padian was a guest on the first episode.

==== Kenny Crossley ====
Kenny Crossley
- Years active: 2012–2014, 2017–present

Kenny Crossley (seasons 10–): Having formerly appeared as a recurring guest throughout seasons 2 to 4, Crossley returned in the tenth season to become one of the main buyers. Crossley hails from New Orleans, Louisiana, where he worked for the Sheriff's Department. Leaving law enforcement behind, Crossley moved out to Los Angeles, California, where he managed storage facilities. Crossley initially formed an early alliance with Barry Weiss, after helping him to open a jammed locker. The pair became close friends, with Crossley even going on to appear with Weiss in Barry'd Treasure and Storage Wars: Barry Strikes Back. Outside of storage units, Crossley owns a business making his own pralines, and owns a clothing line with the tag "Kenny Do It?", many designs of which he is often seen wearing on the show.

==== Shana Dahan and Edwina Registre ====
Shana Dahan and Edwina Registre
- Other name: The Vegas Ladies
- Years active: 2018, 2019

Shana Dahan and Edwina Registre, also known as The Vegas Ladies (seasons 11–12): High school friends Dahan and Registre joined the show in its eleventh season, becoming two of the three new stars appointed by the network. By trade, both Dahan and Registre are insurance brokers; they often attend auctions in their spare time, having developed a love of vintage collectibles at a young age. The pair also run a YouTube channel called "Thrifters Anonymous", where they document items found in either storage units or thrift stores.

==== Justin Bryant ====
Justin Bryant
- Other name: The Rookie
- Years active: 2018, 2019

Justin Bryant, also known as The Rookie (seasons 11–12): Justin was one of three new stars appointed by the network for season 11. At the age of 22, Bryant is the youngest buyer ever to appear on the show. Bryant was inspired to make a name for himself in the storage business after watching the show and developing a love for buying storage units. Since starting, Bryant has used the profits from the units he has purchased to help buy his mother a new home and also employed his older brother.

==== Lisa Delarios ====
Lisa Delarios (season 13-) she joins the show in thirteenth season.

==== Dusty Riach ====
Dusty Riach (season 14-) he joins the show in fourteenth season.

==== Emily Pokoj ====
Emily Pokoj
- Years active: 2026-Present

Emily Pokoj is one of the newest buyers on Storage Wars having made her debut in the Season 17 episode titled "The Slings and Arrows of Outrageous Lockers." That episode saw Emily beat longtime buyer Ivy Calvin to a locker where she made a modest profit and found a chair that was similar to her Grandma's. When she isn't appearing on Storage Wars, Emily is a photographer based in Redondo Beach, California.

=== Recurring buyers ===
==== Nabila Haniss ====
Nabila Haniss, (seasons 2—4): Haniss is a lifelong buyer from Culver City, California, who received attention after purchasing a storage unit that contained items belonging to socialite Paris Hilton. She has since also obtained a unit belonging to television and social media personality Tila Tequila. Haniss appeared as a recurring buyer throughout seasons two to four, often going head-to-head with Dave Hester.

==== Mark Balelo ====
Mark Balelo, also known as Rico Suave (seasons 2—4): Balelo owned a liquidation, wholesale, and distribution company, and an auction house, and also formerly owned a gaming store called "The Game Exchange" from 2009 to 2012. He was known for bringing large sums of money to auctions, as much as $50,000 at a time. He earned the nickname "Rico Suave" for his tendency to dress in fancy clothes at storage auctions. Balelo appeared three times during the second season, five times in the third season, and three times in the fourth season, which was filmed shortly before his death by suicide.

==== Jeff Jarred ====
Jeff Jarred (season 3): Jarred is the owner of the "It's New To You" antique and thrift store, that he runs with his daughter in Burbank, California. He has often fought with Dan Dotson, after accusing him of using sneaky tactics at auctions to allow regular bidders to win units. However, he and Dotson decided to make peace in the third season. He appeared six times during the third season.

==== Herb Brown and Mike Karlinger ====
Herb Brown and Mike Karlinger, also known as The Tank Top Twins (seasons 3—4): Brown and Karlinger are brothers-in-law, who developed a taste for buying units after attending an auction one day out of boredom. They appeared three times in the third season, in the episodes "Portrait of the Gambler", "Nobody's Vault but Mine" and "Still Nobody's Vault but Mine", and three times in the fourth season, in the episodes "Old Tricks, New Treats", "Orange You Glad Dan Sold It Again?" and "That's My Jerry!". Brown and Karlinger also made an uncredited appearance in the episode "Jurassic Bark" where they pranked Dave Hester and earned the nickname the "tank top twins".

==== Mark and Matt Harris ====
Mark Harris and Matt Harris, also known as The Harris Brothers (seasons 3—4): Mark and Matt are identical twins who first appeared in "May the Vaults Be with You" as an appraiser for Barry Weiss when Weiss found a Return of the Jedi jacket in a locker. Since then, the Harris brothers have appeared as recurring buyers throughout the third and fourth seasons. They first appeared as buyers in the episode "The Kook, The Chief, His Son, and The Brothers". The self-proclaimed "Kings of Swag", the Harris brothers specialize in Hollywood memorabilia. They have a company called WOW! Creations, which specializes in celebrity gift bags. They appeared five times in the fourth season in the episodes "Oysters on the Half Plate", "The Shrining", "The French Job", "There's No Place Like Homeland", and "Total Wine Domination".

==== Gunter Nezhoda ====
Gunter Nezhoda (seasons 8—15) is Rene Nezhoda's father who appears alongside Rene in several episodes. Gunter is also of Germanic descent. Like Darrell Sheets' sidekick Chad, Gunter Nezhoda provides the occasional comic relief to Rene but is generally well-meaning as Gunter learns his way through the business. Before his appearance on Storage Wars, Nezhoda worked as a Bass player for artists like Pat Travers, Leslie West, Kevin DuBrow, George Lynch, and Michael Schenker, as well as a photographer and has worked in several films as an actor. After a six month battle with cancer, Gunter died on March 21, 2023.

=== Auctioneers ===
Dan Dotson and Laura Dotson
- Years active: 2010–present

Dan Dotson and Laura Dotson are a husband-and-wife auctioneer team, who run their own business, American Auctioneers, and are the primary auctioneers on the show. Dan has been a professional auctioneer since 1974. He is the primary auctioneer of the two, occasionally giving the reins to Laura, and Laura ends all the auctions by reminding the winning bidders, "Don't forget to pay the lady!" A substitute auctioneer has filled in for the Dotsons on two occasions: in the season 5 episode "The Daneurysm" (2014), after Dan suffered an aneurysm; and in the season 8 episode "Palm Springs Throwdown" (2015), after the Dotsons both got into a physical fight with regular auction buyer Dave Hester.

The "Lord of Lancaster" is a colorful recurring character/antagonist often referenced on A&E's Storage Wars. This nickname describes the strict (and often eccentric) property manager or auctioneer who rules over storage facility auctions held in Lancaster, California. He is known for asserting his reign by enforcing his own rules and levying "tariffs" or extra fees on the visiting bidders, adding an extra layer of difficulty to their typical treasure hunts. The Lancaster location is a frequent backdrop for the show's cast, leading to a few notable episodes directly referencing this ruler. In "The Lion of Lancaster" (Season 9, Episode 21) the cast heads to Lancaster, California. The plot revolves around veteran buyer Ivy Calvin ("The King of Lancaster") fighting to defend his home turf from his rival, Dave Hester, who attempts to steal the crown. In "The Puppet Master of Lancaster" (Season 18, Episode 2): The cast returns to his turf, where he attempts to levy new tariffs on the bidders. Cast members Dusty and Lupe are forced to cleverly distract him to cut out a profit. In "Survey Says... Payback's a Bit*h!" (Season 16, Episode 7): The "Lord of Lancaster" lives up to his name by taxing common folk, while the heavy hitters battle it out for immense lockers containing gold and antique accoutrements.

Other auctioneers have also appeared on the show. Earl and Johan Graham are a father-daughter auctioneer team, who appeared in six episodes in season 4, as the network tried to shake up the show by introducing some new cast members. They appeared in the episodes "The Monster Hash", "The Shrining", "Barry's Angels", "That's My Jerry!", "Total Wine Domination" and "Fear and Loathing in Placentia". They did not return for season 5.

Emily Wears-Kroul
- Years active: 2016–2019

’Emily Wears-Kroul' was appointed as a new semi-regular auctioneer from the tenth to twelfth seasons. Wears was only 17 years old when she finished auction school and is one of the youngest auctioneers currently working in the business. Wears runs her own auction business in Solon, Iowa, with her father, who is a lifelong bid caller. Wears also appeared as a singing contestant during the 15th season of the TV talent show American Idol. Wears married in 2017, and is close friends with auction buyer Mary Padian.

== Episodes ==
Season	Episodes	Originally released	
Season	Episodes	First released	Last released
1	19	December 1, 2010	April 20, 2011
2	33	July 20, 2011	March 4, 2012
3	26	June 5, 2012	December 18, 2012
4	26	March 18, 2013	July 2, 2013
5	35	March 18, 2014	September 30, 2014
6	18	November 11, 2014	March 3, 2015
7	13	April 1, 2015	May 20, 2015
8	20	July 21, 2015	August 25, 2015
9	15	April 5, 2016	May 24, 2016
10	25	April 12, 2017	August 2, 2017
11	29	November 8, 2017	March 28, 2018
12	16	November 7, 2018	January 30, 2019
13	10	April 20, 2021	May 25, 2021
14	36	November 2, 2021	April 19, 2022
15	24	June 6, 2023	August 15, 2023
16	10	June 7, 2025	August 16, 2025
17	12	February 28, 2026	May 9, 2026
18	TBA	May 30, 2026	TBA

== Reception ==
=== Critical response ===
Critical response was mixed, with Mary McNamara of the Los Angeles Times calling Storage Wars "a strangely uplifting show – hope being one of the many things one can apparently find in an abandoned storage unit," and Neil Genzlinger of The New York Times called the series "an especially entertaining addition to the genre." Brian Lowry of Variety said that "'Wars' should have been left in storage, indefinitely." Writing for Slate magazine, Troy Patterson gave a mixed review, referring to the series as "trash TV" as well as "trivial and magnetic." Ellen Gray of the Philadelphia Daily News suggested "if there's an acquisitive bone in your body, you should probably steer clear".

=== Ratings ===
The first-season premiere episode drew 2.1 million viewers and the show was A&E's top-rated non-fiction show for 2010, with an average of 2.4 million viewers. The season two premiere consisted of back-to-back new episodes of the show; the second show drew 5.1 million total viewers and was the highest rating for an episode of a series in A&E history. The combined season premiere outperformed competing original episodes of NBC's Love in the Wild and ABC's Primetime Nightline.

== Concerns about authenticity ==
Some critics have speculated that some of the units have been stocked by producers, but an A&E publicist said: "There is no staging involved. The items uncovered in the storage units are the actual items featured on the show", even though one unit allegedly held the Ark of the Covenant. Executive producer Thom Beers has stated that the vast majority of the storage lockers investigated during production contain nothing of interest and therefore do not appear in the final show. However, Beers admitted that half of the lines are scripted, and so is moving items between storage lockers purchased by the same person.

=== Hester lawsuits ===
In December 2012, a main auction buyer, Dave Hester, filed a lawsuit against A&E and Original Productions, claiming that the producers staged entire units, planted items in lockers after having them appraised weeks in advance, and funneled cash to weaker teams to buy lockers that they could not have otherwise afforded. The suit claims that Hester and other cast members met with network officials to express concerns that those actions violated federal laws that are intended to prevent viewers from being deceived when watching a show involving intellectual skills.

In January 2013, rather than deny the accusations, A&E responded by stating that its composition of the show is covered by the First Amendment and that Hester's claims do not apply; the network also said that the Communications Act of 1934 is inapplicable to cable television, which did not exist in 1934, and that the TV format of Storage Wars involves no "chance", "intellectual knowledge", or "intellectual skill" and so is not a game show. A&E also stated that there are "notable inconsistencies in [Hester's] exaggerated self-portrait", referring to his claims of value on the items that he finds in lockers.

In March 2013, A&E won a partial victory in the suit when a federal judge tossed out Hester's claim of unfair business practices, calling the show "expressive free speech", and stating that his claim of wrongful termination was not specific enough. Hester was ordered to pay the legal fees for A&E.

On September 3, 2013, Hester had one of his claims approved by Los Angeles Superior Court judge Michael Johnson. The court ruled that Hester "can move forward with the wrongful termination portion of his wide-ranging lawsuit against A&E and the producers of Storage Wars."

In July 2014, Hester and A&E settled his lawsuit for an undisclosed amount, and he returned to Storage Wars when new episodes premiered on August 12, 2014.

== Notes ==
The series was re-broadcast on E4 Extra from 1 June 2026 onwards.

== See also ==
- Auction Kings (Discovery Channel; 2010–13)
- Auction Hunters (Spike; 2010–15)
- Storage Hunters (TruTV; 2011–16)
- Baggage Battles (Travel Channel; 2012–16)
