= Storage Wars: New York =

Reality television series

- Genre: Reality
- Starring: Candy Olsen; Chris Morelli; Courtney Wagner; Joe Pauletich; John Luke; Mike Braiotta; Steve Valenti; Tad Eaton
- Narrated by: Thom Beers
- Theme music composer: The Suster Girls
- Opening theme: "Money Owns This Town"
- Country of origin: United States
- Original language: English
- No. of seasons: 2
- No. of episodes: 26 (list of episodes)

Production
- Executive producers: Thom Beers; Philip D. Segal; Jeff Conroy; Dolph Scott; David McKillop; Elaine Frontain Bryant; Fred Grinstein
- Running time: 21 to 22 minutes
- Production company: Original Productions

Original release
- Network: A&E
- Release: January 1 – November 8, 2013

Related
- Storage Wars: Texas

Storage Wars: New York is an American reality television series on A&E. It is a spin-off of Storage Wars. The series follows a group of modern-day storage hunters in an adventurous time finding jewels in storage units across New York. The first season debuted on January 1, 2013, aired with back-to-back half-hour episodes similar to other titles in the series and acquired 2.9 million total viewers. The second season premiered on July 9, 2013, with newest cast member "Big Steve" Valenti.

As of April 2014, the series has not yet been renewed for a third season. Since the airing of the final four Season Two episodes on November 8, 2013, the series has seldom been seen in reruns on A&E, with an announced daytime marathon on January 10, 2014, instead being pre-empted for a Storage Wars: Texas marathon. The series continues to air in other countries, including Canada (on OLN), the UK (on Lifetime TV), Poland (on Canal History) and in South America (on Canal A&E). In the spring of 2014, the show began airing in Africa and Asia, on those territories' History Channels. The show also airs regularly on free streaming service Pluto TV.

== Participants ==
Name	Known As	Position	Seasons	
Name	Known As	Position	1	2
John Luke	The Moslier	Auctioneer	Main	
Joe Pauletich	The Legend	Professional Storage Unit Buyer	Main	
Candy Olsen & Courtney Wagner	The Flame and The Firecracker	Professional Storage Unit Buyers	Main	
Chris Morelli & Tad Eaton	The Loudmouth and The Conscience	Professional Storage Unit Buyers	Main	
Mike Braiotta	The Hustler	Professional Storage Unit Buyer	Main	
Big Steve Valenti	Big Steve	Professional Storage Unit Buyer		Main
Todd McCormick	The Fog	Professional Storage Unit Buyer		Recurring

=== Main buyers ===
- Joe Pauletich - "The Legend": A self-declared legend in the New York auction scene, Joe "P" Pauletich has been in the industry for over two decades. After all that time, the Queens native—who owns a thrift shop called SoHo Treasures—has developed a sixth sense about which units to bid on.
- Candy Olsen & Courtney Wagner - "The Flame" and "The Firecracker": Relatively new to the auction system, Candy and Courtney sell vintage items out of their yellow 1997 Chevy Astro van (nicknamed "The Banana Van"), their shop is called C&C Pop-Up Shop. They have less cash to spend on the units than some of the other buyers, but are still willing to be competitive when necessary.
- Chris Morelli & Tad Eaton - "The Loudmouth" and "The Conscience": Owners of a vintage shop called The Frayed Knot, a store in Hoboken, New Jersey.
- Mike Braiotta - "The Hustler": Braiotta is a "storage room day trader" by trading merchandise he finds in the units he buys for fast cash. He uses the term "flip" which means get money quickly or sell quickly.

=== Recurring buyers ===
- Steve Valenti - "Big Steve": Although Steve appears uncredited and blurred out in early episodes, he officially joined the cast during the second season. He is 6 feet 8 inches tall and is called "Big Steve". Valenti is a partner of one of the biggest flea markets in Brooklyn, New York called the Aquaduck Flea Market. Steve was most known for his aggressive bidding and using his height to intimidate the other buyers.
- D. Todd McCormick - "The Fog": He made his first appearance in Season 2 in the episode "Da Bronx Tale" and made two subsequent appearances. McCormick, while a middle school drop-out, is known as an American Silver specialist.

=== Other cast members ===
- John Luke - "The Moslier" - The show's auctioneer.
- Thom Beers - Narrator of the show and one of the executive producers, Beers provides a quick explanation of the show's premise at the beginning, and does a recap of the featured buyers' profits or losses at the end of each episode.

== Opening ==
As with the other series, Thom Beers sets the scene for the series: "When storage units are abandoned, in the Big Apple, the treasures within go up for auction." This is followed by the preview of that night's episode. In the opening titles that follow a funk rock version of the Storage Wars theme, "Money Owns This Town", plays.

== Episodes ==
Season	Episodes	Originally released	
Season	Episodes	First released	Last released
1	6	January 1, 2013	January 15, 2013
2	20	July 9, 2013	November 8, 2013

== Reception ==
New York Daily News' David Hinckley gave it 3 out of 5 stars, writing that the cast was entertaining to watch.
