= Sky On Demand =

Defunct video on demand service in the Philippines

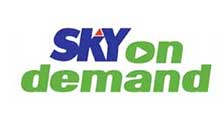
- Sky On Demand Final Logo
- Dissolved: September 1, 2020; 6 years ago
- Successor: iWantTFC
- Area served: Philippines
- Owner: Sky Cable Corporation
- Website: skyondemand.com.ph
- Registration: Subscription to Sky Cable, Sky Broadband, Sky Direct Postpaid or Sky Fiber is required.
- Launched: August 13, 2015; 11 years ago
- Current status: Defunct

Sky On Demand was a video on demand service exclusively available to Sky Cable subscribers in the Philippines. It was owned and operated by Sky Cable Corporation, a subsidiary of ABS-CBN Corporation. It allowed users who were subscribed to either Sky Cable, Sky Broadband, Sky Direct Postpaid or Sky Fiber to watched on demand contents from many pan-regional television channels such as ABS-CBN, S+A, ANC, DZMM TeleRadyo, Liga, Metro Channel, Knowledge Channel, Myx, O Shopping, CNA, Solar Sports, Basketball TV, Jack TV, Al Jazeera, Disney Channel, History Channel, National Geographic, FYI, Channel V, MTV, CNBC, AXN, Asian Food Channel, WarnerTV, Euronews, TVE Internacional and TVBS-Asia, as well as a wide array of foreign and local TV shows and movies from Star Cinema, Paramount Pictures, NBCUniversal, Regal Films, and Viva Films.

Users accessed Sky On Demand contents through either the website interface, the Sky On Demand IPTV set-top box connected to Sky Broadband & Sky Fiber or through its mobile app available for iOS and Android devices connected to any Internet Providers. The Sky On Demand mobile app can also be accessed through other internet service providers or through WiFi with reduced number of contents.

The multi-screen capability of Sky On Demand allow subscribers to choose which gadget they prefer to watch the contents of Sky. Apart from the multi-screen capability, Sky On Demand had advanced features such as tailor-fit recommendations on what to watch and a resume capability of partially watched programs. The service also creates customized playlists for favorite episodes and movies, and for partially watched videos.

On September 1, 2020, Sky On Demand ceased operations in several platforms along with iWant. The streaming service was replaced by iWantTFC.
