= Carry Me Home =

Carry Me Home may refer to:

- Carry Me Home (album), a 2022 album by Levon Helm and Mavis Staples
- Carry Me Home (Love Kills EP), 2007
- Carry Me Home (Third Day EP), 2002
- "Carry Me Home", a song by AC/DC, the B-side of the single "Dog Eat Dog"
- "Carry Me Home", a song by After the Fire from Der Kommissar
- "Carry Me Home", a song by Take That from the 2015 re-release of the album III
- "Carry Me Home", a song by The Killers from the deluxe edition of Battle Born
- "Carry Me Home", a song by The Living End from Roll On
- "Carry Me Home" (Gloworm song), 1994
- "Carry Me Home" (Sweeplings song), 2015
- Carry Me Home (book), a 2001 book by Diane McWhorter
