= Lifetime (Southeast Asian TV channel) =

Asian television channel

- Country: Singapore
- Broadcast area: Cambodia; Fiji; Hong Kong; Indonesia; Malaysia; Macau; Maldives; Mongolia; Myanmar; Pacific Islands; Palau; Papua New Guinea; Philippines; Singapore (main); South Korea; Taiwan; Thailand; Vietnam
- Headquarters: Singapore

Programming
- Languages: English; Korean; Chinese (Mandarin/Cantonese); Thai; Filipino; Malay; Indonesian
- Picture format: 1080i (16:9 HDTV)

Ownership
- Owner: A+E Networks Asia
- Sister channels: History; Fyi (2008-2019); Crime & Investigation Network; H2

History
- Launched: 14 June 2013; 12 years ago 15 September 2021; 4 years ago (relaunch, Malaysia)
- Closed: 14 December 2018 (original, Malaysia, but selected Lifetime shows available on Hello Channel 702 until 30 September 2021)

Lifetime is an Asian television channel owned by A+E Networks Asia.

Like its U.S. & Korea counterpart, Lifetime airs mostly entertainment and lifestyle programs aimed for female audiences. On December 14, 2018, Lifetime ceased on Astro until it was leaked on August 31, 2021, that Lifetime will be relaunch on Astro and September 15, 2021, Astro announced that Lifetime will relaunch on Astro on September 15, 2021, replacing FOX Life that will be ceased on October 1, 2021.

== Programming ==
=== Current ===
- The Ellen DeGeneres Show
- Dance Moms
- Income Property
- Mom's Time Out
- My Haunted House
- MasterChef Australia
- MasterChef Asia
- Right This Minute
- The Amazing Race Australia
- The Rap Game
- The Best Moment to Quit Your Job
- Tiny House Nation
- Zombie House Flipping

=== Upcoming ===
- Married at the First Sight: Australia

=== Previous ===
- F Word Out Loud with Anne Curtis
- Smile
- Hoarders
- Hoarders: Family Secrets
- The Amazing Race Canada
- UnREAL
- Married at the First Sight
- Don’t Trust Andrew Mayne
- Mixology
- Orphan Black
- Resurrection
- King
- Wife Swap
- MasterChef Canada
- MasterChef New Zealand
- Wahlburgers
- Zoo

== See also ==
- Lifetime U.S.A.
