= Tiny House World =

American reality television series

- Genre: Reality television
- Country of origin: United States
- Original language: English
- No. of seasons: 1
- No. of episodes: 16

Original release
- Network: FYI
- Release: November 21, 2015 – present

Tiny House World is an American reality television series that premiered on the FYI cable channel on November 21, 2015. The tiny house movement-inspired series features buyers in various locations around the world trying to find the best tiny homes that would satisfy their needs and budget. The show accompanies Tiny House Hunting and Tiny House Nation, another series about tiny homes aired on the same network. The series is narrated by Tiny House Nation host John Weisbarth.

"FYI was the first network to spotlight the tiny living craze and we're excited to now expand our successful franchise globally," said Gena McCarthy, the vice president of the network's programming.
