= List of Can't Buy Me Love (2023) episodes =

Can't Buy Me Love is a Philippine romantic drama television series produced by Star Creatives. It aired on Kapamilya Channel's Primetime Bida evening block from October 16, 2023 to May 10, 2024.

== Series overview ==
Season	Episodes	Originally released	
Season	Episodes	First released	Last released
1	70	October 16, 2023	January 19, 2024
2	78	January 22, 2024	May 10, 2024

== Episodes ==
=== Season 1 ===
No.	Title	TV title	Original release date (Note: Netflix and iWantTFC are releasing episodes first ahead of the television broadcast.)	AGB Nielsen Ratings (NUTAM People)
1	"A Family Affair"	"Ni Hao"	October 16, 2023	8.0%
Aspiring entrepreneur Bingo lands a chance at a life-changing business grant — only to get derailed when wealthy young Caroline causes a bus collision.
2	"The Eclipse"	"Scandal"	October 17, 2023	8.5%
A confrontation at her half-sister's engagement ceremony leaves Caroline in a rocky position with her family. Meanwhile, Bingo sneaks in with a plan.
3	"The Grand Eyeball"	"Game Plan"	October 18, 2023	9.0%
Bingo makes a clandestine deal for his grandmother's eye transplant, while a criminal gang targets Caroline in a scheme.
4	"The Anti-hero"	"Survivor"	October 19, 2023	8.5%
Bingo has no choice but to try and escape a deadly situation with an unconscious Caroline. But his gamble comes at a tremendous cost.
5	"The Mad Woman"	"Trust"	October 20, 2023	9.2%
Still hiding from her family, Caroline looks for a way to pay back Bingo — who tails her around the city and finds her in more trouble.
6	"The Constitution"	"Accusation"	October 23, 2023	7.7%
Caroline tries to make sense of her abduction, while Bingo refuses to leave her alone. Wilson contemplates the future of the company.
7	"Foot Forward"	"Interrogation"	October 24, 2023	8.0%
After the police interrogate Bingo, Caroline reluctantly strikes a deal with him to try to get to the bottom of the mystery.
8	"Takes One to Know One"	"Problem Solving"	October 25, 2023	7.3%
Bingo questions Snoop about his involvement in the abduction and urges him to make things right. A tragedy from the past haunts Caroline.
9	"Stop and Go"	"Suspects"	October 26, 2023	8.0%
Caroline recounts the events surrounding her kidnapping as Bingo helps figure out their next move. Cindy prepares for the upcoming power struggle.
10	"Just to See You"	"Questions"	October 27, 2023	7.6%
Bingo and Snoop draw out a lead after they run into a familiar face at a wake. As the list of suspects grows, Caroline decides whom to go after first.
11	"The Missing Piece"	"Spy"	October 30, 2023	8.0%
Caroline ropes Bingo into a devious plan to check out one of their suspects. Later, she stumbles upon a surprising new clue.
12	"The Gathering"	"Threat"	October 31, 2023	8.0%
As she tells Bingo of her discovery, Caroline looks back on her relationship with one of her half sisters. Edward mysteriously disappears.
13	"Blame Game"	"Amendments"	November 1, 2023	7.8%
Bingo receives an ominous message from a gangster. A family meeting doesn't go as planned after Caroline makes an unexpected announcement.
14	"No Easy Way Out"	"Unidentified Man"	November 2, 2023	8.5%
After a close call on the road, Bingo convinces Caroline to remain in hiding. Albert sets his sights on wrangling a better business deal out of Wilson.
15	"Trouble Will Find Me"	"Ling in Trouble"	November 3, 2023	8.0%
While looking for leads with Snoop, Bingo notices a crucial detail when he recognizes a shifty man from afar. Caroline bumps into the neighbors.
16	"Danger Stranger"	"Danger"	November 6, 2023	8.1%
Bingo and Snoop frantically search for Caroline as a suspicious group stalks around the tenement. A favor from a friend leads to a new suspect.
17	"How You Get the Girl"	"Bait"	November 7, 2023	8.7%
Wilson's abrupt announcement catches Albert off guard. At a flashy nightclub, Bingo teams up with Jersey and makes a move on Irene.
18	"The Sister"	"Great Pretender"	November 8, 2023	7.1%
Bettina weighs the cost of her ambition. A cyberattack against the Golden Lotus Corporation threatens to ruin its reputation.
19	"Drunk Walk Home"	"Uncover"	November 9, 2023	7.5%
Wilson's team scrambles to respond to an ongoing threat. After Bingo returns from Irene's house, he finds an irate Caroline.
20	"On the Rocks"	"Clowns in Town"	November 10, 2023	7.4%
With enough evidence in hand, Caroline prepares to move back in with her family. Bingo's investigation brings him face to face with an old friend.
21	"Send in the Clowns"	"Clown Chase"	November 13, 2023	8.3%
Bingo learns how a tragic incident connects to his past. Kap's birthday party unintentionally puts the local community in danger.
22	"The Trick"	"Warning"	November 14, 2023	7.5%
The neighbors rally behind Bingo after he comes clean about Caroline's abduction. Meanwhile, a new scheme targets another Tiu sibling.
23	"Irene's Secret"	"Sister's Secret"	November 15, 2023	7.0%
Despite her father's wishes, Caroline insists on heading out to search for Irene and inadvertently learns a long-hidden secret.
24	"My Kidnapper"	"Real Intention"	November 16, 2023	7.2%
Charleston takes drastic measures to find the hackers behind the Golden Lotus breach. Bingo and Snoop's latest mission ends in a tense standoff.
25	"What Matters Most"	"Finding Irene"	November 17, 2023	6.8%
After Snoop figures out a way to track down Irene, Caroline and Bingo head to her location and find her in a desperate situation.
26	"Head-On Collision"	"Payback"	November 20, 2023	8.0%
Questions about Bingo's past continue to haunt him, even as life returns to normal. Wilson puts up reward money for Balong's capture.
27	"Message Sent"	"Cryptic Quack"	November 21, 2023	8.1%
Bingo finds out who caused the bus collision that ruined his business prospects, but a dinner invitation presents him with a chance to revive his pitch.
28	"The Parentals"	"Nice to Meet Tiu"	November 22, 2023	7.4%
As Bingo and Snoop prepare to meet the Tius, Caroline receives cryptic messages from someone who claims to know secrets from her childhood.
29	"The Dinner Party"	"First to Quack"	November 23, 2023	7.6%
At the Tiu family dinner, Edward and Charleston trade barbs while Bingo asks Wilson an unexpected question. Snoop tries to get to know Irene.
30	"OPIP"	"Aray For an Eye"	November 24, 2023	6.9%
Caroline heads to a covert meeting with her mysterious acquaintance. Bingo prepares for his grandmother's surgery, only to encounter new complications.
31	"Bad Blood"	"Project: OPIP"	November 27, 2023	7.7%
Bingo faces the Tiu siblings as he pitches his business plan at the Golden Lotus office. Later, Caroline pays his family a surprise visit.
32	"Illicit Affairs"	"Steady Decisions"	November 28, 2023	7.1%
Charleston's search for the hacker points to a notoriously elusive cybercriminal. Meanwhile, Caroline gets wind of a shady plot.
33	"That Elusive Million"	"Punishment"	November 29, 2023	6.8%
When a fight between Caroline and Irene gets out of hand, Wilson thinks of a suitable punishment. Bingo and Snoop find a new way to make some cash.
34	"Students of Life"	"Teaching a Lesson"	November 30, 2023	7.7%
Wilson's mentor takes in Caroline and Irene as part of her restaurant's staff, but they start at the very bottom. Bingo tries his hand at live selling.
35	"Strange Fellows"	"The Struggle is Real"	December 1, 2023	7.1%
As Caroline and Irene scramble to adapt to their new jobs, Wilson and Cindy accuse one of their children of a serious crime.
36	"The Mastermind"	"Search For the Truth"	December 4, 2023	7.5%
Confused after their recent encounter, Bingo looks for Caroline at the restaurant. The family mistrusts one of their own after an apparent betrayal.
37	"One Last Favor"	"Volt In"	December 5, 2023	8.1%
Bingo attends a free marketing talk to up his game. Caroline gets an unlikely visitor at work as she tries to get to the bottom of her family's dilemma.
38	"Caught in the Middle"	"Investigation"	December 6, 2023	6.9%
Bingo cuts Snoop in on his deal with Caroline, who wants him to find out what her target is hiding. Charleston opens up to Carlo to try to win him over.
39	"Told You So"	"Fishy Fishy"	December 7, 2023	7.4%
Cindy finds a drunk Irene and makes her feel guilty for quitting her job. Caroline and Bingo stalk Jaime as he leaves his office.
40	"Big Man, Little Dignity"	"Trackdown"	December 8, 2023	6.6%
Hoping to collect evidence, Snoop and Bingo shadow Jaime to a clandestine meeting. Charleston swears revenge on the person behind his downfall.
41	"All for the Money"	"Money, Money, Money"	December 11, 2023	7.7%
Bettina bails Irene out of a tricky situation, leading to an earnest conversation. Bingo and Caroline's mission hits a snag as they review his recording.
42	"Cracking the Code"	"Unmute"	December 12, 2023	7.6%
With Carlo's help, Charleston deciphers the clues surrounding the hacking. A chance encounter with a street vendor helps Snoop uncover vital information.
43	"Eyes Wide Open"	"Impending Doom"	December 13, 2023	7.8%
Bingo and Caroline desperately try to locate Charleston to keep him out of trouble, only to stumble upon something horrific.
44	"Aftershock"	"RIP, Edward"	December 14, 2023	7.8%
As the Tius come to terms with the recent tragedy, Charleston is still nowhere to be found. Meanwhile, rumors about the incident make the rounds online.
45	"So Many Questions, So Few Answers"	"Blame Game"	December 15, 2023	6.2%
Bingo goes out of his way to help Caroline. Bettina gets caught up in a police investigation and later tells Wilson a secret that could jeopardize her.
46	"As a Friend"	"Support System"	December 18, 2023	8.5%
Bingo recalls a critical detail about the day of Edward's death just as the cops find a key piece of evidence. Wilson presses Charleston for the truth.
47	"Under Arrest"	"Lost Chance"	December 19, 2023	8.2%
Dreading the investigation, Bettina relives a fateful day in her head. Bingo heads to Caroline to tell her what he remembers and tries to cheer her up.
48	"Make it Right"	"One Call Away"	December 20, 2023	8.0%
A run-in with Irene panics Snoop. Wilson and Albert try to outplay each other while the cops hound Bettina. The Tius ask Bingo for a favor.
49	"Take Two"	"Eye Witness"	December 21, 2023	9.7%
Caroline vouches for Bingo after he agrees to help the Tius. Gina hatches a plan when she gets hold of confidential information about Edward's death.
50	"The Truth Untold"	"Standing Strong"	December 22, 2023	6.5%
Irene begs for her job back. Bingo invites Caroline over for dinner with his family. Things take a grim turn for Bettina as the investigation heats up.
51	"Safe Place"	"Sibling Agenda"	December 25, 2023	7.0%
Distraught after a fight with Cindy, Caroline confides in Bingo at the tenement. Charleston and Carlo make a dramatic attempt to clear Bettina's name.
52	"Testify My Love"	"Testimony"	December 26, 2023	7.7%
Caroline settles into her new job and immediately causes a stir. As Bingo prepares for the trial, Cindy learns something shocking about him.
53	"Fair Lady"	"Carnival Date"	December 27, 2023	7.3%
A break in Bettina's case gives the Tius an opportunity to come to her aid. Refusing payment for his help, Bingo asks Caroline for one thing in return.
54	"Ride with You"	"First of Firsts"	December 28, 2023	8.6%
Bingo takes Caroline on a night tour of Binondo's simple pleasures. Irene hits back at Bingo's friends, who provoke her at work.
55	"Tables Turning"	"Core Memory"	December 29, 2023	7.2%
Bingo and Caroline share a quiet moment until the weather brings back unpleasant memories. Edward's death continues to raise questions.
56	"Heiress Behavior"	"Apprenticeship"	January 1, 2024	7.9%
Caroline refuses to fit in with her co-workers, and the sudden arrival of her new boss leads to a complicated situation.
57	"Usual Suspect"	"Clash of Minds"	January 2, 2024	8.0%
Charleston grows wary as the police investigation takes a new turn. A sneaky crime at the warehouse leaves Bingo and Caroline at odds.
58	"Highly Intelligent Daughter"	"Heiress Problems"	January 3, 2024	8.0%
As things grow tense, Caroline settles her differences with Bingo. The cops dig deeper into Edward's case. Bougie's friends convince her to pursue Bingo.
59	"Anger Management"	"Bold and Resilient"	January 4, 2024	9.0%
When Caroline's proposal threatens a major layoff, Bingo asks her to reconsider. Irene offers Snoop an odd job. The investigation hones in on Charleston.
60	"Saved/Delete"	"Spill the Beans"	January 5, 2024	7.8%
Caroline's recent blunder draws backlash from the workers, and Bingo is left to handle the fallout. Charleston and Carlo conspire against the police.
61	"Who Are You?"	"Cross Swords"	January 8, 2024	9.0%
Bingo attempts to make amends with a remorseless Caroline, who later makes an unexpected discovery at her childhood home.
62	"Twisted Nightmares"	"Blast From The Past"	January 9, 2024	8.0%
Caroline is in shambles as she relives her mother's death and soon gets into a row with Wilson. Cindy frets over a loose end from her past.
63	"You'll Be Safe Here"	"Safe With Me"	January 10, 2024	9.3%
Snoop and Irene share drinks on the sly. While Bingo deals with the thief at work, Caroline is pushed to the edge when she gets trapped in the warehouse.
64	"Lady Bird"	"Missing in Action"	January 11, 2024	9.4%
As Irene's addiction takes a toll, Gina pries into Carlo's secrets. Caroline's psychiatrist urges her to seek the truth about events from long ago.
65	"Midnight"	"Pursuit of Truth"	January 12, 2024	7.4%
Caroline is unsettled by a trail of mysterious clues and looks for Pato to find answers about her past. Charleston warns Gina to back off.
66	"Unbecoming"	"Follow the Quack"	January 15, 2024	7.7%
Bingo joins Caroline in her search and hires Snoop to find a lead. With business on the decline, Wilson's new crisis manager proposes a drastic solution.
67	"Master"	"Caress and Crisis"	January 16, 2024	7.6%
Irene handles a sticky situation at the restaurant. Bingo and Caroline try to track down Pato and piece things together.
68	"Clear and Present Danger"	"Catch to Quack"	January 17, 2024	7.6%
Irene tries to recall details of her night out with Snoop. Bingo spots a shady man at the warehouse as Caroline meets up with Jersey to follow a hunch.
69	"The Real Score"	"All Eyes on You"	January 18, 2024	8.6%
Caroline asks Stephen for a risky favor while a worried Jersey reaches out to Bingo for help. Later, Bingo and Caroline have an awkward conversation.
70	"Closer Together"	"Hide and Seek"	January 19, 2024	8.2%
After Caroline goes incognito to find new information, Bingo tries to keep her out of trouble. Wilson and Cindy consider their succession plan.

=== Season 2 ===
No. overall	No. in season	Title	TV title	Original release date	AGB Nielsen Ratings (NUTAM People)
71	1	"Closer to You"	"Sweet Escape"	January 22, 2024	4.7%
Stephen sets his heart on winning Caroline over; meanwhile, she and Bingo attempt to outrun guards while they're trapped in Edward's penthouse.
72	2	"A Different Light"	"Retracing Steps"	January 23, 2024	6.0%
Charleston contemplates one of his schemes. Carlo stalks Bingo and Caroline as they find a way to re-create Edward's final hours.
73	3	"Let You In"	"Close Encounter"	January 24, 2024	5.4%
Bingo and Caroline follow a lead while trying to crack the mystery, but their day ends in disaster. A row between Charleston and Carlo turns violent.
74	4	"Red"	"Overflowing Care"	January 25, 2024	5.0%
As he recovers, Bingo remembers a harrowing interaction with his mother. Caroline heads to the tenement to see him and is shocked by what she finds.
75	5	"Home is Where the Heart Is"	"Wounded"	January 26, 2024	4.5%
Caroline becomes protective of Bingo and later takes charge when a crisis occurs. Monching's well-intentioned plans trigger a heated fight.
76	6	"Now or Never"	"Eyes on the Prize"	January 29, 2024	4.4%
At a charity event, Bettina surprises her family and asks Irene for a favor. The cops question Liv after new evidence emerges. Bougie makes a confession.
77	7	"Bubbling Up"	"Hidden Feelings"	January 30, 2024	5.2%
While Bingo deals with an emotional Bougie, things become awkward between him and Caroline. Charleston worries about the consequences of his secrets.
78	8	"Axe to Grind"	"Feelings"	January 31, 2024	5.2%
After a mishap on the street brings them closer, Caroline begins to appreciate her bond with Bingo. Wilson prepares his family for an upcoming dilemma.
79	9	"Too Soon for Goodbyes"	"Feel the Rush"	February 1, 2024	6.0%
As Bingo returns to work, Cathy has an unexpected response to Caroline's pitch. The family meeting goes awry after Bettina lashes out at Charleston.
80	10	"A Flurry of Feathers"	"Graduation"	February 2, 2024	5.0%
Caroline parts ways with Bingo and tries to make sense of an unfamiliar feeling. Snoop begins to worry about Irene. Bettina meets the competition.
81	11	"Driver"	"Feather Girl"	February 5, 2024	5.5%
Wondering about Bingo, Caroline watches his livestream in secret and meets up with him later to look for their mystery woman. Wilson weighs his options.
82	12	"An Invitation"	"Payback Time"	February 6, 2024	5.9%
A figure from the past prepares to strike at the Tius. While discussing their next move, Caroline and Bingo come up with a new business idea.
83	13	"Stage Fright"	"Near, Yet Far"	February 7, 2024	5.0%
As the Lunar New Year approaches, Bingo tries to split the evening between a pageant and a party where Caroline is checking out a suspect.
84	14	"Ready or Not"	"Unexpected Arrival"	February 8, 2024	6.1%
At the party, the Tius run into their prospective CEO, Stephen makes a grand gesture and Bingo rushes to make it to Caroline in time.
85	15	"Party Pooper"	"Face From The Past"	February 9, 2024	5.4%
Bingo and Caroline share a tender moment as the new year begins. Gina is shocked to catch a glimpse of a familiar face from afar.
86	16	"Total Control"	"Solemn Promises"	February 12, 2024	4.7%
Sneaking out of the party, Bingo and Caroline make a heartfelt vow. Gina gives Cindy a warning. Two conspirators move against the Tius.
87	17	"Mothers"	"New Boss"	February 13, 2024	5.3%
Wilson steps down and names a new CEO. Bingo invites Caroline to dinner after they tail their current suspect. Irene finds a way to settle her worries.
88	18	"Love is a Trap"	"Plus One"	February 14, 2024	4.7%
Bingo heads out to meet Caroline, only to find a rival crashing their dinner plans. Snoop and Irene try to re-create the evening they spent together.
89	19	"Poison"	"Sweet Talk"	February 15, 2024	5.0%
After resuming her mission with Bingo, Caroline figures out who killed Edward. A meeting with Annie puts Cindy and Gina on edge.
90	20	"Nice to Meet You"	"The Meeting"	February 16, 2024	6.0%
The police arrest the suspects behind Edward's killing. Caroline doubts Bingo's intentions after discovering a detail he kept from her.
91	21	"The World Collapses"	"Ghost of the Past"	February 19, 2024	5.9%
Caroline learns more than she'd expected during a tense conversation with Annie. Soon after, Bingo has a harrowing encounter with a woman from his past.
92	22	"One Million Reasons"	"Back to Quack"	February 20, 2024	6.8%
Bingo spends the night at a bar and lands in trouble. Pato reveals her secrets to a distraught Caroline, who uses them to make an accusation.
93	23	"When it Rains"	"Double Trouble"	February 21, 2024	6.9%
The Tius rally behind Cindy as Caroline blames her for Divine's death. Still reeling from their run-in, Bingo feels betrayed by Annie.
94	24	"Matter of Destiny"	"Emergency"	February 22, 2024	6.9%
Bingo faces dwindling finances after an accident lands Nene in the hospital. Caroline goes up against her family to seek justice for her mother.
95	25	"A Lot Like Love"	"Feelings Don't Lie"	February 23, 2024	7.0%
While Caroline tries to gather more evidence, Bingo chases after her to make a confession and ask for a big favor. Snoop continues to fuss over Irene.
96	26	"A Boy's Wish"	"Surprise Meet Up"	February 26, 2024	5.4%
Bingo joins Caroline as she looks for a new lead, but he ends up facing Annie unexpectedly. Stephen secretly prepares to invest in the business proposal.
97	27	"Mothering"	"In Your Face"	February 27, 2024	5.2%
Unable to contain his resentment, Bingo confronts Annie about her past. The Tiu siblings compete for an important post, causing friction in the family.
98	28	"The Past Is Never In The Past"	"Lucky To Have U"	February 28, 2024	5.4%
As their lives get complicated, Bingo and Caroline promise to face their troubles together. Pato makes a tough choice when an old enemy threatens her.
99	29	"The Queen's Secret"	"Here For You"	February 29, 2024	6.2%
After a brush with a foe, Caroline learns that Divine's mistake might have cost lives. Cindy opens up about the past.
100	30	"A Right Choice"	"Dig Deeper"	March 1, 2024	5.9%
Overwhelmed, Caroline stays at Bingo's tenement and looks for a way to prove Divine's innocence. Cindy recalls her old secrets.
101	31	"How To Move On"	"Brave Soul"	March 4, 2024	6.2%
Bingo demands information from Annie about Divine's alleged lover. Later, he plans an out-of-town trip with Caroline but hides his true motives.
102	32	"Top Of The World"	"La Sinfonia"	March 5, 2024	5.7%
Sherwin and Annie plot to turn Bettina against her family. Irene meets a popular old schoolmate at her new job. Caroline and Bingo embark on their trip.
103	33	"Game On"	"Close to You"	March 6, 2024	5.9%
Taking a breather at La Sinfonia, Bingo and Caroline plan their next steps and face an awkward situation. Bettina asks Wilson for the COO post.
104	34	"You Call"	"Tius Your COO"	March 7, 2024	7.1%
Caroline and Bingo make a generous offer to Ibe, who is impressed by their pitch. At the Golden Lotus office, Wilson is torn over whom to choose as COO.
105	35	"Big Winner"	"The COO"	March 8, 2024	6.0%
Wilson makes a decision that upends everything. Bingo tells Caroline the real purpose of their trip to La Sinfonia. Annie and Sherwin seek a new target.
106	36	"Reputation"	"Defiance"	March 11, 2024	5.2%
Bingo and Caroline try to keep their feelings in check to focus on their priorities, but Ibe suddenly turns cold. Charleston makes a spiteful threat.
107	37	"Check The Label"	"Fight For Love"	March 12, 2024	4.8%
At La Sinfonia, Stephen gets in the way of Bingo and Caroline's close friendship. Snoop and Irene are drawn to each other in the face of new challenges.
108	38	"Red Flag"	"Furious"	March 13, 2024	5.5%
Cindy and Gina scramble to keep Caroline from finding out the truth. Meanwhile, Bingo and Stephen's rivalry comes to a head.
109	39	"Attack"	"Allies"	March 14, 2024	5.5%
Stephen tries to force Caroline to go back to Manila. Later, she and Bingo finally get through to Ibe, who is troubled by his past deeds.
110	40	"A Love That Moves Mountains"	"Cover Up"	March 15, 2024	6.0%
Ibe's confession leads to more questions about Divine's death. At a loss, Bingo and Caroline contemplate their next move.
111	41	"A Question of Trust"	"Suspicion"	March 18, 2024	6.0%
When Charleston urges Caroline to stop digging into the past, she wonders whether he's hiding something and decides to investigate with Bingo.
112	42	"Beat You to the Punch"	"Fight for Truth"	March 19, 2024	5.4%
Bingo agrees to participate in a fight to learn more about Charleston's past. As Snoop starts his new job, Irene is conflicted about her feelings.
113	43	"Ties That Bind"	"Fragments"	March 20, 2024	6.4%
After their mission comes up short, Bingo and Caroline head to the tenement, where they encounter an unwelcome guest.
114	44	"Tasty"	"Shadows of the Past"	March 21, 2024	5.5%
Bingo and Caroline unexpectedly find a lead while trying out a restaurant. Irene gets jealous when Snoop takes the afternoon off with a friend.
115	45	"Partnered"	"Peace Before The Chaos"	March 22, 2024	6.6%
Caroline's surprise gesture gives Bingo some time to bond with his friends and family, but the two of them face new challenges as soon as they return.
116	46	"Blood in Your Hands"	"Deceiving"	March 25, 2024	5.8%
Caroline discovers new information that makes her suspicious of Charleston. Annie tries to reconcile with Bingo and finds a way to earn his forgiveness.
117	47	"Knife Through the Heart"	"Manipulation"	March 26, 2024	5.1%
Charleston attempts to intimidate Bingo. Caroline notices a strange detail in Divine's case, prompting her to search for a key piece of evidence.
118	48	"Darkness Falls"	"The Dark Side"	March 27, 2024	5.2%
Charleston asks Carlo to step up and help him. Caroline searches for the investigator who handled Divine's case. Nene's illness takes a toll.
119	49	"Helpless"	"Hopeless"	April 1, 2024	5.7%
Snoop, Irene and Dara land in trouble after their spat gets out of control. Caroline makes Bingo a generous offer as he tries to find a donor for Nene.
120	50	"Change of Heart"	"Trump Card"	April 2, 2024	6.0%
Bingo refuses to accept Annie's help, despite Monching's desperate plea. Snoop makes things right with Irene, who goes on her first date with Aldrich.
121	51	"Bonding"	"Lost and Found"	April 3, 2024	5.8%
As Bingo realizes he can no longer keep his feelings to himself, Caroline joins Carlo on a hunting trip and discovers something shocking.
122	52	"Admission"	"One Last Piece"	April 4, 2024	6.2%
Carlo's blunder enrages Charleston. Bingo prepares to confess his feelings to Caroline, but the night takes a dark turn when she shows him her new clue.
123	53	"Thicker than Water"	"The Turn Around"	April 5, 2024	7.1%
Bingo and Caroline meet up with a man who could help reopen Divine's case. Irene shares her goal with Snoop, who encourages her to pursue it.
124	54	"Father Dear"	"Revelations"	April 8, 2024	8.0%
Caroline forces the truth out of her family. Bingo asks Annie for her side of the story. Charleston makes a confession that opens another mystery.
125	55	"Playing the Cards"	"Tables Turned"	April 9, 2024	6.5%
Annie tells Bingo what she knows of Divine's death. Snoop and Irene work together on her new business. Sherwin gathers the Tius for a fateful meeting.
126	56	"Collapse"	"Fall of Patriarchy"	April 10, 2024	6.5%
Annie makes an announcement at the Golden Lotus boardroom — and a terrible accusation that stuns the family. Bingo receives unexpected news.
127	57	"Everything Falls Apart"	"Endless Agony"	April 11, 2024	8.1%
Bingo tries to come to grips with his newfound status. In the wake of Annie's scheme, the Tius face a crisis and learn Wilson's secret.
128	58	"Mother and Child"	"Starting Over Again"	April 12, 2024	6.9%
Bingo and Annie spend the day together and attempt to make sense of the past. Divine's case has a surprising development.
129	59	"What Do You Care For?"	"Twisted Fate"	April 15, 2024	6.5%
Bingo takes Annie's side as the police detain her, causing a rift between him and Caroline. Gina and Charleston scheme to protect the family.
130	60	"Tainted Love"	"Family Matters"	April 16, 2024	7.0%
Caroline defies Bettina. Snoop lets Irene in on his secret. After Nene gets news from her doctor, Bingo receives a generous gift and meets a new ally.
131	61	"Rich of You"	"The Confession"	April 17, 2024	7.0%
Bingo meets up with Caroline to mend their bond and make a confession, but things don't go as planned. Charleston offers an opportunity to an old enemy.
132	62	"Vested Interests"	"Big Deal"	April 18, 2024	6.3%
Snoop has an awkward meal with Irene and Aldrich. As Bingo takes over Golden Lotus, the Tius try to regain control — at a painful cost for one of them.
133	63	"Mastermind"	"Web of Problems"	April 19, 2024	7.0%
Wilson makes a proposition to Bingo after Caroline disagrees with the family's plans. The Tius' retribution triggers a chain of disasters.
134	64	"Prisons"	"The Bargain"	April 22, 2024	6.6%
Left with no other option, Bingo strikes a deal with Wilson to save Snoop and his mother. Caroline faces a difficult choice for the family's future.
135	65	"The Price We Pay"	"Sacrifice"	April 23, 2024	5.7%
Wilson secures help from Stephen's family and makes a dubious promise in return. Bingo breaks Annie's heart with an agonizing decision.
136	66	"You Are Everything To Me"	"Goodbye Again"	April 24, 2024	6.3%
Determined to end Annie's feud with the Tius, Bingo sells them the company. Soon after, a family member gets into a terrible car crash.
137	67	"A Wake"	"Don't Give Up On Us"	April 25, 2024	5.7%
Caroline desperately reaches out to Bingo, who is distraught with grief. Later, he discovers an ominous clue from a photo of the recent tragedy.
138	68	"Light as a Feather"	"The Engagement"	April 26, 2024	7.0%
Bingo and Snoop rack their brains to get to the bottom of the mystery. Stephen makes Caroline a generous offer. Wilson vows to find Divine's killer.
139	69	"Better Choices"	"Hidden Desires"	April 29, 2024	7.5%
Caroline prepares for her upcoming wedding, but Snoop and Irene mess with her plans. Bingo finds an unexpected lead while visiting Ibe.
140	70	"Connivance"	"Connect the Dots"	April 30, 2024	7.5%
Snoop and Irene hatch a plan to bring Bingo and Caroline together. Wilson unearths secrets surrounding Divine's death as he continues to investigate.
141	71	"Feathers of the Same Bird"	"Killer Clues"	May 1, 2024	7.0%
Caroline confides in Wilson after overhearing Cindy's suspicious conversation. Meanwhile, Bingo attempts to figure out Ibe's real motives.
142	72	"I Take You, Caroline"	"Criminal Mind"	May 2, 2024	8.5%
Realizing that he's been deceived, Ibe hunts down Bingo to retaliate. Wilson prepares his family against their enemy as Caroline's wedding draws near.
143	73	"To Have and to Hold"	"Kidnapped"	May 3, 2024	7.0%
On her wedding day, Caroline disappears on her way to the church. Snoop bares his heart to Irene despite knowing the odds.
144	74	"Minutes to Midnight"	"Priceless Get Away"	May 6, 2024	7.3%
Caroline and Bingo lie low on a remote island as they enjoy a moment of peace, but trouble is already brewing. Irene confesses her feelings to Snoop.
145	75	"No Regrets"	"Priceless Trap"	May 7, 2024	6.0%
Bingo surprises Caroline with a romantic gesture, only to be hounded by their foe soon after. Later, Wilson helps them smoke out a traitor in the family.
146	76	"Mystery Solved"	"Priceless Killer Reveal"	May 8, 2024	8.0%
The family grapples with betrayal as Bingo, Caroline and Wilson lay a trap for their enemies. Cindy comes to realize she has made a terrible mistake.
147	77	"You'll Be Unsafe Here"	"Priceless Plot Twist"	May 9, 2024	8.3%
Old secrets unravel after a family member strikes at Bingo and Caroline, just as the rest of the Tius scramble to find them.
148	78	"The Unshoppable List"	"Priceless Finale"	May 10, 2024	8.5%
Bingo and Caroline navigate love, grief and second chances as they leave the past behind to face an uncertain future together.
