= Cami Bradley =

Pop music vocalist from Spokane, Washington

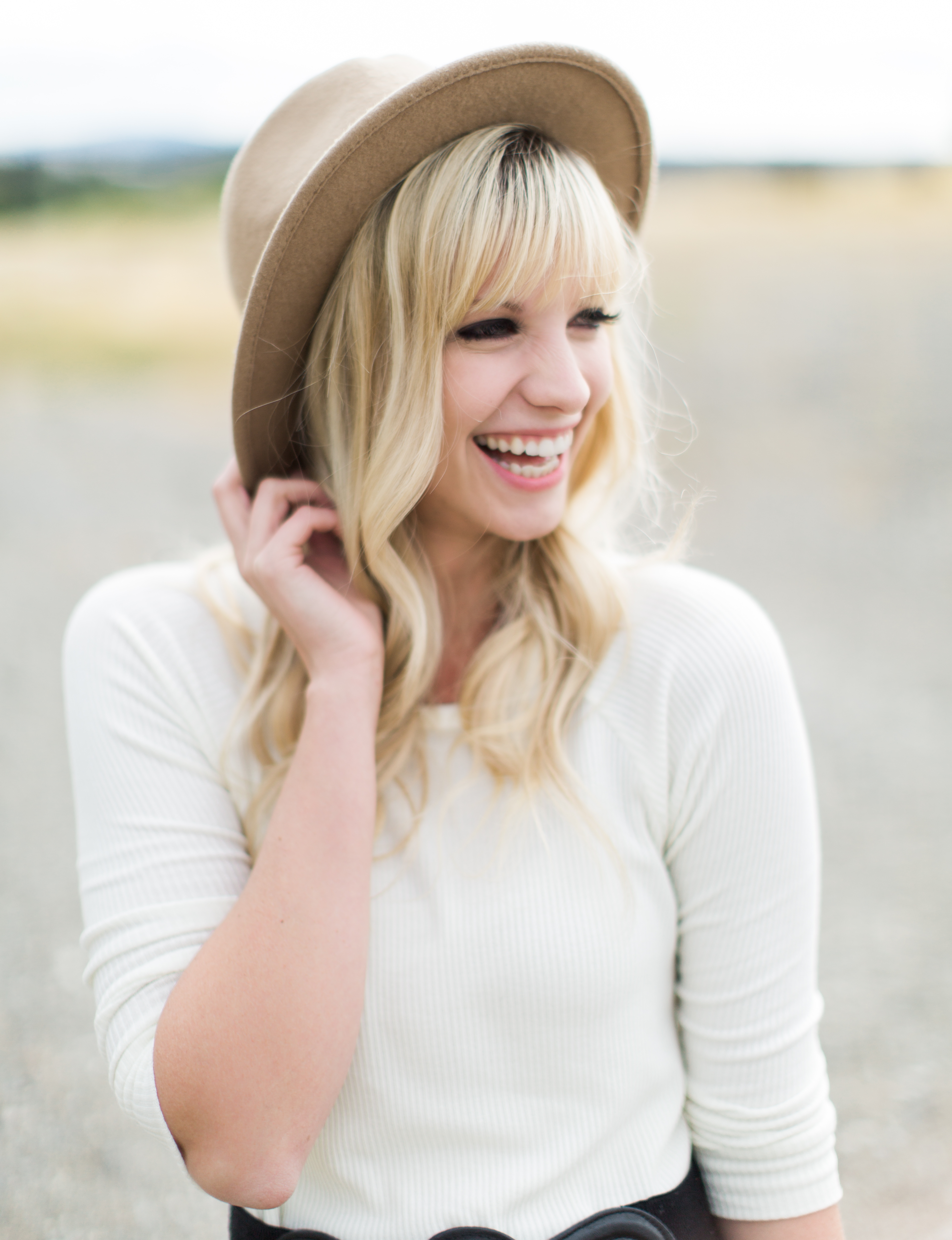
- Cami Bradley in 2016

Background information
- Born: Carmen Jane Miller; May 26, 1988 (age 38); Spokane, Washington, U.S.
- Genres: Folk music; pop music
- Instruments: Vocals; keyboards
- Years active: 2013–present
- Labels: Marrow MP; Nettwerk
- Website: thesweeplings.com camibradleyphotography.com www.carmenjanemusic.com

Carmen Jane "Cami" Bradley (born May 26, 1988) is an American singer-songwriter and keyboardist from Spokane, Washington. Bradley gained fame in 2013 as a contestant on season eight of America's Got Talent, during which she advanced to the finals by performing her arrangements of popular songs including "Believe". Bradley finished the season in sixth place.

Prior to her appearance on America's Got Talent, Bradley won a local singing competition in Spokane in 2006. She self-released two solo projects in 2009 and a third in 2013. Following her national exposure, Bradley and Alabama singer-songwriter Whitney Dean formed a collaboration called the Sweeplings. She formed a second collaboration in 2019, Carmen Jane, to pursue a more experimental sound.

The Sweeplings have released numerous works including the full-length album Rise & Fall (2015); songs including "Carry Me Home" have since been used in television series and promotional videos. Bradley and Dean joined Nettwerk in 2017 for their third EP, Sleepwalking, and a deluxe version of Rise & Fall. A full-length album scheduled for 2018 was scrapped; after a seven-month break, Bradley and Dean released the EP Losing Ground Vol. 1 in March 2020; volume two was released in September.

== Background ==
Carmen Jane Miller was born in Spokane, Washington, into a musical family. Her father, Paul Miller, was the worship leader at the family's church; he was practicing vocal scales in the car while on the way to perform services when four-year-old Cami started singing along. Her mother, Amy Miller, said that was when they knew she had both singing talent and an ear for music.

Cami Miller began learning the piano by age seven, and started writing songs at ten, though she later called those efforts terrible. Her early style was influenced by a wide range of music, including artists Christina Aguilera and Natalie Cole, and soundtracks to Disney films. Miller began performing her songs during her teen years; the week before she turned 18, she won a car by finishing first in the Spring 2006 season of the local Gimme the MIKE competition. When it was suggested that she should try out for national, televised singing competitions like The Voice, she declined because she did not find the idea to be appealing.

Miller married Eric Bradley on August 25, 2006.

== Career ==
=== 2009: Anomalous and Unhinged ===
Cami Bradley's first recording effort was the full-length album Anomalous, released in April 2009 and featuring 12 songs. Bradley later said she was happy with the album, but it did not really represent her because she was still trying to find her artistic voice. In June 2009, she released the four-song EP Unhinged, including a medley of the traditional hymns "Amazing Grace" and "'Tis So Sweet".

=== 2013: Seas and America's Got Talent ===
Bradley self-released her second full-length album Seas in May 2013, featuring her husband Eric on drums. A Kickstarter campaign in April to fund the album's release concert raised nearly $4,000. Seas comprises seven songs including "This Ocean", a duet with her younger brother Ryan Miller, one-half of the indie duo the Rustics. For this album, Bradley said she wrote emotional stories based on the experiences of people close to her, to create "a picture of what I see other people feeling."

Early in 2013, Bradley got a telephone call from a scout with America's Got Talent suggesting that she send them a video of her performing. The producers then sent her to audition in Chicago, where she began to have second thoughts. Instead, she sang an a cappella version of "Somewhere Over the Rainbow", prompting the judges to put her through to the Las Vegas round; there, she performed "Summertime" and advanced to the live shows.

"Believe" cover by Cami Bradley
Excerpt from 2013 America's Got Talent performance that put Bradley into the spotlight

Bradley's televised appearance during the Las Vegas episode was brief; it was her quarterfinals performance that propelled her into the national spotlight. Bradley accompanied herself on piano in a stripped-down performance of "Believe", earning praise from the judges. Mel B lauded the brave arrangement and suggested that Cher might consider a similar approach. Howard Stern agreed, and said it was like hearing the lyrics and their meaning for the first time. Howie Mandel said Bradley had a haunting style and a "star quality ... that could possibly take her all the way."

Bradley continued into the finals of the competition with rearranged versions of pop songs including "Can't Help Falling in Love" and "Livin' on a Prayer". Her sixth-place finish left her happy and newly confident, having been given the opportunity to "get out of my comfort zone."

After America's Got Talent wrapped, Bradley joined her fellow finalists on a two-month tour. She appeared on FORTE's debut album as the featured guest on "The Prayer", and performed the song live with FORTE at Carnegie Hall.

=== 2014–present ===
==== The Sweeplings ====
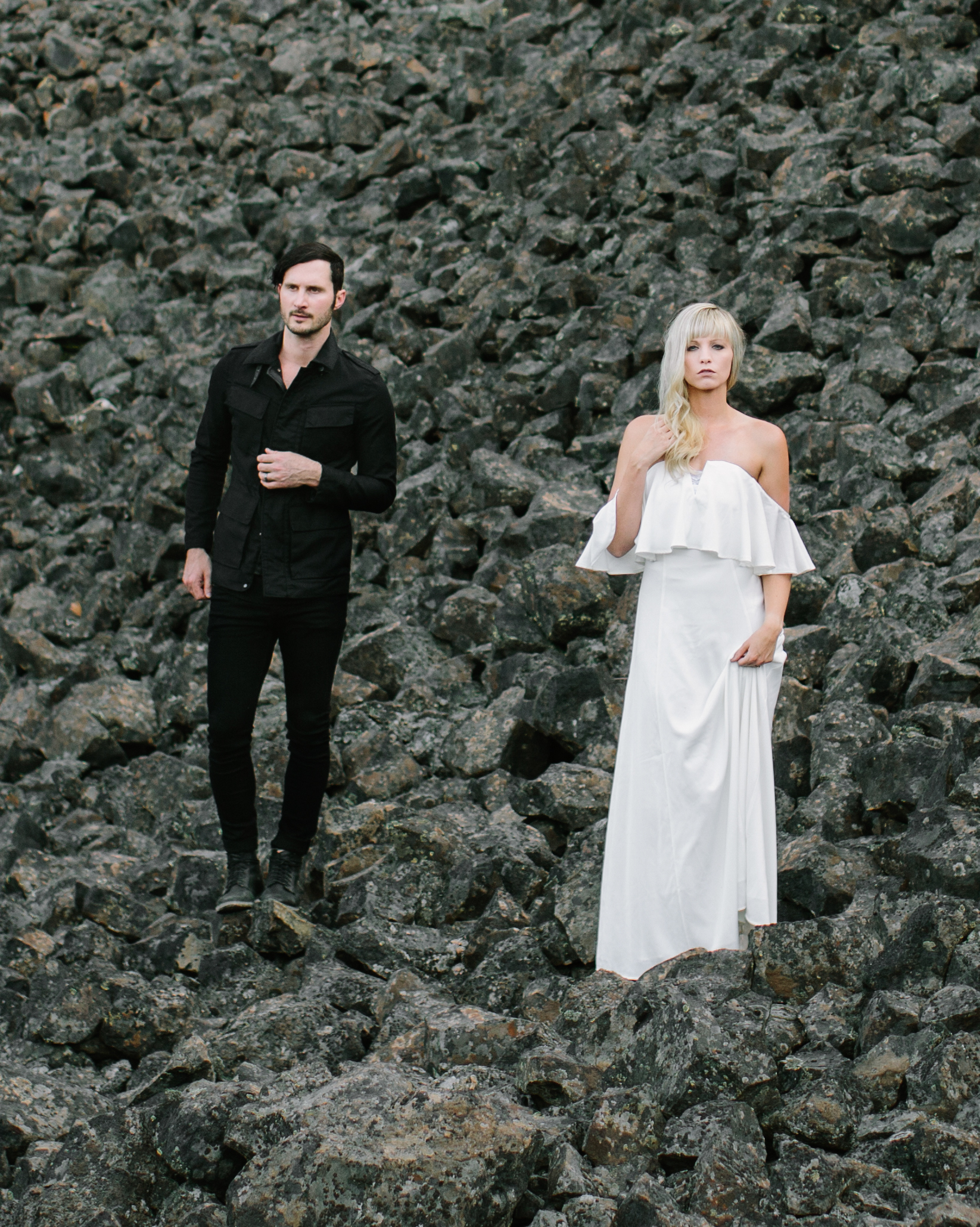
The Sweeplings (l–r): Whitney Dean and Cami Bradley

Singer-songwriter Whitney Dean was working on his music while at home in Huntsville, Alabama, when his wife suggested that they watch Bradley perform on America's Got Talent. Afterward, Bethany Dean said her husband and Bradley should write music together. Bradley declined on first contact, but Bethany Dean persisted; within a few months, Whitney Dean and Bradley began collaborating via Skype. In April 2014, the Deans were invited by the Bradleys to visit their home in Spokane, Washington, and the meeting was both pleasant and productive. Within their first weekend, Cami Bradley and Whitney Dean had co-written eight songs.

A self-titled, four-song EP was released in September 2014, but the new duo did little promotion at first, because Bradley did not want her fans to be confused if the pairing did not work out; Bradley also wanted to make clear that she and Dean were not a romantic couple. Instead, she released videos of cover songs as a solo artist so people would not forget about her.

In August 2015, the Sweeplings released their debut album, Rise & Fall, on their own label. NPR had premiered the song "Carry Me Home" the month before, and iTunes later placed the song on its list of the 25 best singer-songwriter tracks of 2015.

In February 2016, Billboard premiered the video for "Under Your Spell", a song about the struggle with life choices. Albums to follow included Covers, Ch. 1; the EP Winter's Call; a Christmas album, Merrier Days; a deluxe version of Rise & Fall; and the EP Sleepwalking. An album planned for 2018 was put on hold when "some tragedy, some loss, some internal struggle" led Bradley and Dean to take an extended break.

In 2020, Losing Ground was released as two EPs; the first in March, and the second in September. Each volume features seven songs. Also in 2020, The Sweeplings uploaded several official music videos to their YouTube channel, including "In Between" in January, "Bleed Me White" in March, and "I Won't Go" in August.

==== Carmen Jane ====
In 2019, Bradley formed a second collaboration in addition to her music with the Sweeplings. After her given name, Carmen Jane is a collaboration between Bradley and Bennett "Benn Suede" Vogelman. Carmen Jane makes songs that feature a different tone than her other work, a more experimental "dark pop" sound reminiscent of Billie Eilish. Bradley's collaborator in Germany is producer Nico Rebscher, and their work is "the first time I've felt fully me in music."

Carmen Jane is based in Los Angeles, where Bradley also travels to write music with her brother, Ryan.

== Critical reception ==
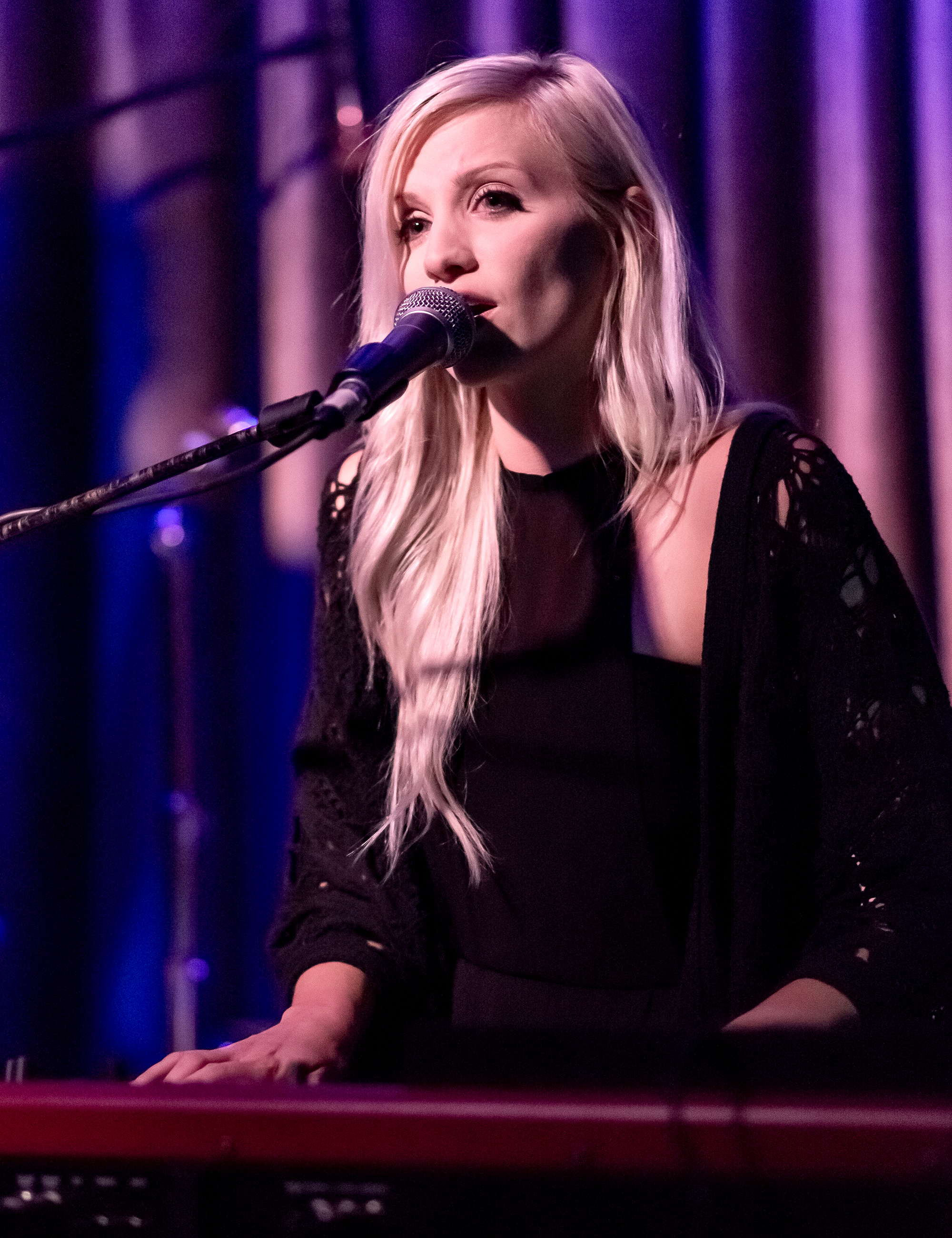
Cami Bradley performing live with Whitney Dean (not pictured) at the Hotel Cafe in Hollywood in 2018.

People magazine praised Bradley during her appearances on America's Got Talent. "There's something about this 25-year-old's voice that pulls you in as she takes on classic songs and makes them her own." Of "Believe", entertainment editor Avery Thompson wrote, "with just a piano and her incredible voice, Cami stole the show and perhaps the competition."

A readers' poll conducted annually by Inlander named Bradley the Best Singer-Songwriter of 2015 and 2016. She placed second in the same poll in both 2017 and 2018.

AllMusic wrote that songs composed by Bradley and Dean reveal "a penchant for haunting, tender harmonies and a roots-inspired sound that bears similarities to The Civil Wars." PopDust rated Rise & Fall No. 15 on its list of best albums of 2015, on which "Dean and Bradley float across vast landscapes of dusty tones and shadowy figures." The Birmingham News called it "an uncommonly focused, polished and big-stage-ready debut from an independent band". Elmore Magazine noted Bradley's "concise" chemistry with Dean.

In its review of Sleepwalking, Atwood Magazine wrote, "Cami Bradley's breathtaking voice leads with pain and passion, charged with a poignant edge that is as biting as it is bitten."

== Personal life ==
Eric and Cami Bradley lived primarily in Spokane, Washington, and worked at her father's church there. They bought a small second home in Huntsville, Alabama, to facilitate Cami's career with the Sweeplings; their home search was featured on a 2016 episode of Tiny House Hunting. Cami Bradley also is a professional photographer. They moved to Los Angeles in 2023 to facilitate the development of her pop career.

== Discography ==
=== Albums ===
As a solo artist

- Anomalous (2009)
- Unhinged (EP, 2009)
- Seas (2013)

With the Sweeplings

- The Sweeplings (EP, 2014)
- Rise & Fall (2015)
- Covers, Ch. 1 (2016)
- Winter's Call (EP, 2016)
- Rise & Fall (Deluxe Edition) (2017)
- Merrier Days (EP, 2017)
- Sleepwalking (EP, 2017)
- Losing Ground Vol. 1 (EP, 2020)
- Losing Ground Vol. 2 (EP, 2020)

=== Singles ===
As a solo artist

- "Come Around" (2013)

With the Sweeplings

- "Snow May Be Falling" (2014)
- "Cannonball" (2015)
- "Carry Me Home" (2015)
- "In Too Deep" (2016)
- "Hold Tight" (2016)
- "What We Once Were" (2016)
- "Fool" (2017)
- "Losing You" (2017)
- "Let It Snow! Let It Snow! Let It Snow!" (2018)
- "In Between" (2020)
- "Bleed Me White" (2020)
- "Shake the Dust" (2020)
- "Running" (2020)
- "Deep & Wild" (2020)
- "I Won't Go" (2020)
