= Outdoor Research =

American outdoor sports apparel and gear manufacturer

- Company type: Private company
- Industry: Retail
- Founded: 1981; 45 years ago
- Founder: Ron Gregg
- Headquarters: Seattle, Washington, U.S.
- Products: Apparel, accessories, and gear for outdoor recreation
- Website: https://www.outdoorresearch.com

Outdoor Research is a Seattle-based manufacturer of gear for outdoor sports.

== Company history ==
Ron Gregg was a nuclear physicist and mountaineer who left his science career in 1980 in order to join an expedition up North America’s highest peak, Denali. After enduring an open bivouac at 12,500 feet with temperatures reaching -20 °F, Gregg’s climbing partner suffered from frostbitten feet and was subsequently evacuated by helicopter. This event inspired and challenged Gregg to find a solution to cold, wet, and exposed feet in precarious mountain environments.

Gregg founded Outdoor Research the following year and released the company’s first product; the X-Gaiter. In 1982, REI placed the Outdoor Research First Aid Kit on the back cover of its catalog. Within days, all 1,000 kits of the first order sold out. By 1984, Outdoor Research had evolved into the space of protective handwear with the Modular Mitts, one of the first gloves utilizing a layering system with a removable inner liner and external hard shell.

In 1986, Outdoor Research was included in Inc. magazine’s annual list of the 500 fastest-growing, privately held companies in the country. The business explored new territory in 1993 with the production of their first apparel product, a pair of soft shell pants inspired by Gregg’s ascent of Aconcagua, the tallest mountain in South America. Outdoor Research expanded even further in 1995 with the acquisition of their current headquarters at 2203 1st Ave South in the SoDo district of Seattle.

On March 17, 2003, Gregg was killed in an avalanche while skiing in the Kokanee Glacier Provincial Park near Nelson, British Columbia, Canada. This same year, Dan Nordstrom purchased the company with the intention to “build the company while at the same time retaining its reputation as an innovative maker of mountaineering equipment.”

In 2007, Outdoor Research began its first foray into adventure culture community events with the sponsorship of Vertfest in nearby Snoqualmie Pass, Washington.

== Awards ==
Since 2011, Outdoor Research has received 23 awards from Outside Magazine, 21 awards from Backpacker Magazine, and numerous Gear of the Year and Editor’s Choice Awards from publications like National Geographic, Runner’s World, and Backcountry.

== Athletes and ambassadors ==
Outdoor Research sponsors athletes and brand ambassadors that are professionals in the company’s core sports. Examples include rock climber Beth Rodden, who is best known for her numerous first female ascents throughout the Yosemite Valley, including a redpoint of the 5.14c Meltdown. Hans Florine, also an Outdoor Research Ambassador, is one of the most accomplished rock climbers of his time, holding various speed records as well as over 100 ascents of The Nose on El Capitan.

Also on the Outdoor Research Ambassador roster is professional skier and host of the hit TV series Tiny House Nation, Zack Giffin; alpine and ice climbing guide Sarah Hueniken; and Swiss-American ski mountaineering guide Martin Volken.
