= The Sweeplings =

American pop–folk duo of Cami Bradley and Whitney Dean

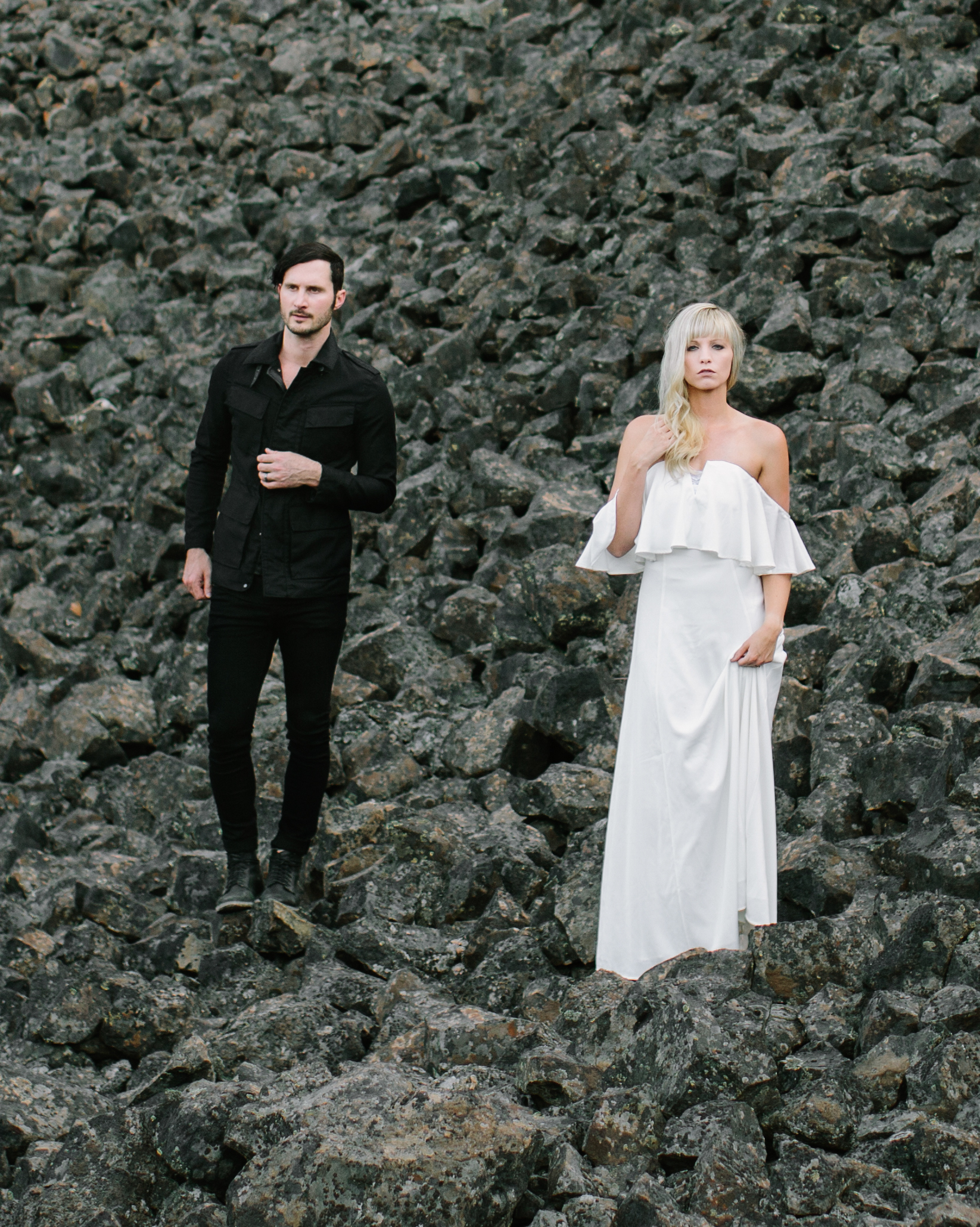
- The Sweeplings ([l–r]: Whitney Dean, Cami Bradley) in 2016

Background information
- Genres: Folk music; pop music
- Years active: 2014–present
- Labels: Marrow MP; Nettwerk
- Members: Cami Bradley; Whitney Dean
- Website: thesweeplings.com

The Sweeplings is an American pop–folk duo comprising singer-songwriters Cami Bradley and Whitney Dean. The two musicians met in 2014 after Dean's wife saw Bradley perform during an episode of America's Got Talent and suggested that her husband should write music with Bradley. Their first meeting resulted in eight songs co-written over the course of a weekend, and their debut, self-titled EP.

The Sweeplings followed with their debut full-length album Rise & Fall in 2015 and Covers, Ch. 1 in 2016. Also in 2016, the EP Winter's Call was released; the Sweeplings joined Nettwerk in 2017 for their third EP, Sleepwalking. Their first full-length album with Nettwerk was scheduled for fall 2018, but was placed on hold while the group worked out some creative differences. Losing Ground Vol. 1 was released in March 2020, accompanied by two music videos; volume two was released in September.

== History ==
=== Background ===
Cami Bradley is a singer-songwriter and musician from Spokane, Washington. Born into a musical family, Bradley showed an aptitude for music at age four, was writing her own songs by age ten, and released solo albums in 2009 and 2013. She was scouted in 2013 by producers of America's Got Talent, who sent her to audition for its eighth season, during which she gained praise and notoriety for her stripped-down performances of popular songs like "Believe". She finished the season in sixth place.

Whitney Dean is a singer-songwriter and musician from Huntsville, Alabama. Dean is the son of a voice and piano teacher, and he and his brother Bradley comprised one-half of the local band Firewood. Whitney Dean has written music for artists in Nashville, Tennessee; he toured with John Paul White for two years on lead guitar and background vocals, doubling as road and production manager to earn college credits.

=== Formation ===
After Dean and his wife watched a Bradley performance on America's Got Talent, Bethany Dean said her husband and Bradley should write music together. Bradley declined on first contact but Dean's wife persisted; the two musicians began collaborating via Skype a few months later. In 2014, the Deans were invited by the Bradleys to visit their home in Spokane, and the weekend meeting was both pleasant and productive, resulting in eight songs.

The name 'Sweeplings'—denoting a small grouping that writes sweeping melodies—was chosen by Bethany Dean, and was originally her title for a project by her husband before Cami Bradley joined.

=== Career ===
A self-titled, four-song EP was released in September 2014, but the new duo did little promotion at first, because Bradley did not want her fans to be confused if the pairing did not work out. Instead, she released videos of cover songs as a solo artist.

In August 2015, the Sweeplings released their first full-length album, Rise & Fall, on their own label. NPR had premiered the song "Carry Me Home" the month before, and iTunes later placed the song on its list of the 25 best singer-songwriter tracks of 2015.

In February 2016, Billboard premiered the video for "Under Your Spell", which Dean called "a classic tale of good and evil" and the struggle with life's choices. The Sweeplings' second album, Covers, Ch. 1, was released in July 2016; the video for their reimagining of "Twinkle, Twinkle, Little Star" was released in November. Also in November, the duo presented their four-song EP Winter's Call.

Upon signing with Nettwerk Music Group in 2017, the Sweeplings offered a deluxe version of Rise & Fall, including an alternate version of "Hold Me" and two songs that didn't make the original cut. The duo's third EP, Sleepwalking, was released via Nettwerk in August, featuring six songs. A Christmas EP, Merrier Days, followed in November.

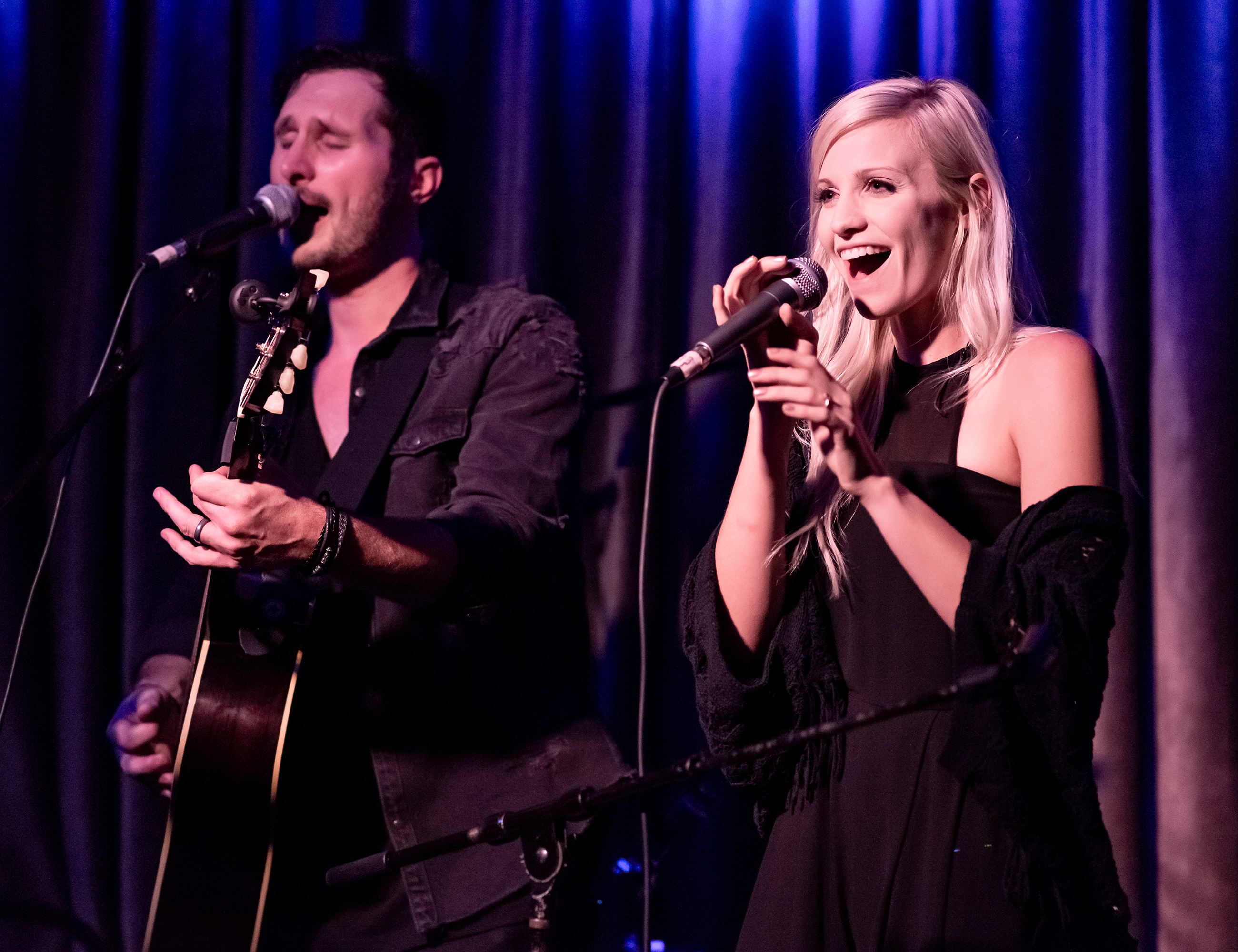
The Sweeplings ([l–r]: Whitney Dean, Cami Bradley) performing live at the Hotel Cafe in Hollywood in 2018.

The duo had planned to release a full-length album via Nettwerk in 2018; after two weeks' work, "some tragedy, some loss, some internal struggle" led to difficulties in finding their vision, and they decided to take some time off. Seven months later, they chose to scale back to piano, guitar and vocals. Their EP Losing Ground was released in two volumes; the first in March 2020, and the second in September. Each volume features seven songs.

Also in 2020, The Sweeplings uploaded numerous official music videos to their YouTube channel, including "In Between" in January, "Bleed Me White" in March, and "I Won't Go" in August. Another song, "You Find Me", was added to Apple Music's singer-songwriter playlist 'Acoustic Chill'.

Since the Sweeplings write and communicate via email and Skype, they often travel across the country to finish their efforts. The Bradleys bought a small second home in Huntsville, Alabama, to facilitate the band's career; the home search was featured on a 2016 episode of Tiny House Hunting.

== Critical reception ==
iTunes' staff wrote that the Sweeplings' music reveals "a penchant for haunting, tender harmonies and a roots-inspired sound that bears similarities to The Civil Wars." PopDust called Rise & Fall "a potent collection of narratives with gut-wrenching textures built on a foundation of powerful harmonies and sharp musicianship". The Birmingham News called it "an uncommonly focused, polished and big-stage-ready debut from an independent band". Elmore Magazine said the album's songs tend to "blend together because of similar sounds, but the chemistry is concise and makes the album whole, not all over the place like many debuts seem to be".

Atwood Magazine called Sleepwalking "haunting, bittersweet and altogether mesmerizing ... when The Sweeplings evoke hurt, we feel a shred of resilience ... Darkness comes with a bit of light, and vice versa." Of Losing Ground Vol. 1, PopMatters wrote, "The Sweeplings might make the most gorgeous music by a folk-pop duo since the unfortunate demise of the Civil Wars". "Bleed Me White" earned raves from American Songwriter, which called it "the definition of a duet and pedestals itself on perfectly balanced vocal harmonies and pulsing piano, textured with light strings. It is elegance in simplicity at its finest."

== Other appearances ==
The Sweeplings' songs have appeared in official promotional videos and television series. "In Too Deep" was used for the winter premiere of the ABC Family (later Freeform) drama The Fosters; the duo later performed the song on an episode of the show and appeared on Freeform's first Facebook Live musical performance. Freeform also used "In Too Deep" for the season finale of Pretty Little Liars in 2016.

The official trailer for the final season of the Netflix series Longmire was set to "Carry Me Home" and episode 1 featured the song in its final scenes. The Vampire Diaries and Good Behavior also have featured the Sweeplings' music.

== Discography ==
=== Albums ===
- The Sweeplings (EP, 2014)
- Rise & Fall (2015)
- Covers, Ch. 1 (2016)
- Winter's Call (EP, 2016)
- Rise & Fall (Deluxe Edition) (2017)
- Merrier Days (EP, 2017)
- Sleepwalking (EP, 2017)
- Losing Ground Vol. 1 (EP, 2020)
- Losing Ground Vol. 2 (EP, 2020)

=== Singles/Videos ===
- "Snow May Be Falling" (2014)
- "Cannonball" (2015)
- "Carry Me Home" (2015)
- "In Too Deep" (2016)
- "Hold Tight" (2016)
- "What We Once Were" (2016)
- "Fool" (2017)
- "Losing You" (2017)
- "Let It Snow! Let It Snow! Let It Snow!" (2018)
- "In Between" (2020)
- "Bleed Me White" (2020)
- "Shake the Dust" (2020)
- "Running" (2020)
- "Deep & Wild" (2020)
- "I Won't Go" (2020)
