= IWant =

Philippine over-the-top content platform

iWant
- Logo used since July 9, 2025

- Screenshot iWant's website on July 10, 2025
- Former names: ABS-CBNnow! (2003–2010); iWant TV (2010–2018); iWantTFC (2020–2025)
- Company type: Subsidiary
- Website type: OTT platform PPV
- Available in: Tagalog; English (Note: The website interface is only in English. However, available media is mostly in Filipino with some content in English.)
- Founded: 2003; 23 years ago
- Predecessor: Sky On Demand
- Area served: Worldwide
- Owner: ABS-CBN Corporation
- Key people: Jaime Lopez (head of ABS-CBN Digital Media); Jolly Estaris (head of iWant); Linggit Tan-Marasigan (COS, CEO); Richard Reynante (CCO); Andrew Favis (COO)
- Industry: Entertainment, mass media
- Products: Video on demand; streaming television
- Services: Film production; film distribution; television production; television distribution
- Parent: ABS-CBN Digital Media
- Website: web.iwanttfc.com
- Commercial: Yes
- Registration: Monthly/yearly subscription required to access content
- Users: ▼3.1 million (December 2023)
- Launched: 2003; 23 years ago
- Current status: Active

iWant (stylized in lowercase), formerly known as iWant TV and briefly as iWantTFC, is a Filipino subscription video on-demand over-the-top streaming television service and production company owned and operated by ABS-CBN Digital Media, a division of ABS-CBN Corporation. The service traces its roots to the launch of ABS-CBNnow! in 2003, one of the first Internet television and video on demand platforms in the Philippines that catered primarily to overseas Filipinos. In addition to offering on-demand content from ABS-CBN, iWant also livestreams linear channels, including Kapamilya Channel, DZMM TeleRadyo, Jeepney TV, ANC (premium), Knowledge Channel, MOR Entertainment, and Myx.

The service is available worldwide. It served as the replacement for Sky On Demand of Sky Cable starting September 1, 2020. On May 7, 2025, it was announced that the "iWant" branding would return, reverting to its former name on July 9, 2025.

== History ==
=== International streaming service: TFC.tv (TFC Online) ===
==== Origins as ABS-CBNnow! (2003–2008) ====
ABS-CBNnow! was launched in 2003 as one of the first Filipino-owned over-the-top and video on demand platforms. It primarily catered to overseas Filipinos, allowing them to stream ABS-CBN television programs such as TV Patrol, Maalaala Mo Kaya, Wansapanataym, and The Buzz. Users could stream or download DRM-protected content via Windows Media Player. By 2005, the platform had approximately 23,000 subscribers worldwide, with major markets in the United States, the United Kingdom, and Canada.

==== Rebranding to TFCnow! (2008–2011) ====
In 2008, ABS-CBNnow! was rebranded as TFCnow! to align with The Filipino Channel (TFC)'s international brand identity. The platform expanded its reach globally, offering both on-demand and live streaming of ABS-CBN and TFC programming for overseas subscribers.

==== Launch of TFC.tv (2011–2020) ====
In 2011, TFCnow! was renamed TFC.tv, also known as TFC Online. It served as ABS-CBN's primary international streaming platform, providing access to ABS-CBN's global content library. The service operated until its merger with iWant in 2020.

=== Domestic streaming service: iWant ===
==== Introduction of iWant TV (2010–2018) ====
Separately from its international counterpart, ABS-CBN launched iWant TV for domestic audiences in the Philippines. The platform offered free and subscription-based access to ABS-CBN programs, along with selected foreign channels such as National Geographic, FYI, History, Nickelodeon, E!, Food Network, Asian Food Channel, CNN, and Cartoon Network. In August 2015, iWant TV premiered its first digital-exclusive film, Must Date the Playboy, in partnership with ABS-CBN Mobile. On September 26, 2016, ABS-CBN partnered with PLDT and Smart Communications to allow their customers to access iWant TV content through mobile and broadband subscriptions.

==== Relaunch as iWant (2018–2020) ====
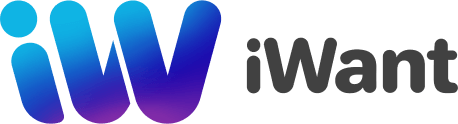
iWant logo used from November 21, 2018 to August 31, 2020

On November 16, 2018, ABS-CBN relaunched iWant TV as iWant, repositioning it as a digital-first streaming platform focused on original Filipino programming, similar to Netflix, Viu, Amazon Prime Video, Hooq, and iflix. The relaunch introduced iWant Originals such as Spirits: Reawaken, Quezon's Game, Alamat ng Ano, Glorious, and MA, marking ABS-CBN's increased focus on exclusive digital content.

=== Merger of platforms: iWantTFC (2020–2025) ===
Logo used from September 1, 2020 to July 8, 2025

On September 1, 2020, ABS-CBN merged its domestic platform iWant with its international service TFC.tv to form iWantTFC. The merger unified ABS-CBN's global and Philippine streaming operations, combining both on-demand and live content into one service. Subscribers of TFC IPTV and TFC Direct via cable and satellite gained online access through the "TFC Everywhere" feature. In June 2021, ABS-CBN made iWantTFC's full library free for users in the Philippines. On April 26, 2023, ABS-CBN and GMA Network announced a partnership to stream GMA's international channels and selected programs on iWantTFC for audiences outside the Philippines.

=== Return to iWant branding (2025–present) ===
On May 7, 2025, ABS-CBN announced plans to globally rename the service back to "iWant", featuring a redesigned interface, enhanced performance, and an expanded library of Filipino and international titles. Originally scheduled for launch in June 2025, the new version officially went live on July 9, 2025.

== Content ==
iWant stores over 1,000 films and television series totaling over 10,000 hours of content and several live on-demand channels and video on demand. Most of its content and films are produced by ABS-CBN Corporation's divisions, including ABS-CBN Studios and ABS-CBN Films. There are over 20 original films and over 50 original series produced by iWant.

The platform also provides live streams of several of ABS-CBN's broadcast properties, some operated by ABS-CBN's subsidiaries Creative Programs and ABS-CBN International. Kapamilya Channel, DZMM TeleRadyo, Jeepney TV, and Knowledge Channel are exclusively available in the Philippines, while The Filipino Channel, ANC Global, DZMM TeleRadyo Global, Cinema One Global, Cine Mo! Global, MOR Entertainment, and Myx America (North America only) are available outside of the Philippines.
