= Crime & Investigation Network (Asian TV channel) =

Crime & Investigation
- Country: Singapore; Malaysia; Philippines; Indonesia; Thailand; Hong Kong; Taiwan
- Broadcast area: Brunei; Hong Kong; Indonesia; Macau; Malaysia; Maldives; Mongolia; Myanmar; Pacific Islands; Papua New Guinea; Philippines; Singapore; Taiwan; Thailand
- Headquarters: Singapore

Programming
- Languages: English; Mandarin; Cantonese; Indonesian; Thai; Malay; Filipino
- Picture format: 1080i HDTV

Ownership
- Owner: A+E Networks Asia (A+E Networks/Astro Overseas Limited)
- Sister channels: History; Fyi (2008–2019); H2; Lifetime

History
- Launched: 15 June 2007; 19 years ago

Crime & Investigation (also known on promotions as "CI" before 2017 and branded on-air and stylized as "Crime + Investigation", formerly Crime & Investigation Network) is a Southeast Asian pay television channel which focuses on crime, investigation and mystery programming. It is run by A+E Networks Asia, a joint-venture between A+E Networks and Astro Holdings Sdn Bhd and was launched on June 15, 2007.

It was launched on June 15, 2007, available initially in Malaysia, Brunei, Singapore, and Hong Kong and then from 2008 in the Philippines, Thailand and Indonesia. It is also currently available in Taiwan via the CHT MOD IPTV service. It is based on the international versions of the channel which shares its name.

== Programming ==
- 24 to Life
- 48 Hours Mystery
- Australian Federal Police: Frontline
- Beyond Scared Straight
- Bloodwork
- Born to Kill?
- Bordertown: Laredo
- Catching the Craigslist Killer
- Cajun Justice
- Crime & Punishment
- Crime: Crossing the Line
- Dog the Bounty Hunter
- Evil Up Close
- Fatal Vows
- FBI: Criminal Pursuit
- Forensic Investigators
- Justice Files
- Look Who's Stalking
- Medical Detectives
- Murder on the Social Network
- My Crazy Ex
- On the Case with Paula Zahn
- Parking Wars
- Real Crime
- Real Interrogations
- See No Evil
- Sins & Secrets
- Steven Seagal Firearm
- The First 48
- The First 48: Missing Persons
- The Nightclub Killer
- The Will: Family Secrets Revealed
- Vanished with Beth Holloway
- Wicked Attraction

== See also ==
- A+E Networks
- Astro Holdings Sdn Bhd
- Bio Asia
- History Asia
- Crime & Investigation Network
