= Zack Giffin =

American builder-contractor, tiny-house movement advocate, reality TV co-host

- Born: April 20, 1983 (age 42); Gold Hill, Colorado, U.S.
- Occupations: Builder-contractor, TV co-host, professional skier
- Organization(s): Operation Tiny Home, Tiny Home Industry Association
- Television: Tiny House Nation; FYI; A&E; Netflix
- Movement: Tiny-house movement
- Spouse: Alexandra LeGrant (m. 2018)
- Children: 1
- Website: https://m.youtube.com/@TinyHouseRevival

Zack Giffin (born April 20, 1983) is an American carpenter and builder-contractor, tiny-house movement advocate, co-host of the FYI reality television series Tiny House Nation, and former professional freeskier.

== Career ==
=== Road to Tiny House Nation ===
Before he was hired to be the co-host of the July 2014-launched FYI series Tiny House Nation wherein he also took the role of being the show's chief builder-contractor, Giffin ran with his brother Sam a production company they called Right On Brother Productions, producing short films. After gaining local fame with their material, Giffin was partnered with photographer Grant Gunderson to travel around the world to ski for bigger-budget production companies.

In the process of his being a skier born and raised in Gold Hill, Colorado who later decided to move to the Mt. Baker Ski Area in Washington, and previously a teenager who went on ski trips all over the United States and Canada on vehicles modified for the parking-lot lifestyle, and then with his globe-trotting with Gunderson, Giffin acquired ample appreciation for the practicality of mobile homes, and, as a professional carpenter and a new advocate of mobility, became attracted to the larger "tiny house" concept, philosophy and aesthetics after seeing one such house. He looked at the idea of travelling while shooting videos, and with the high cost of RV rentals the couple decided to build their own tiny home. With the help of one of his skiing sponsors, Outdoor Research, Giffin built his first tiny home in the fall of 2011, completing it with the help of friends and family in less than two months. Thereafter he set out on an almost-constant travel aboard the new house for three years while he produced short films that would later be known as the "OR Tiny House Tour" videos. As a culmination of this project, Giffin's brother Sam edited a 20-minute short film from the collection entitled "Livin' Tiny - A Quest for Powder", which received wide viewership on YouTube. The film was watched by television executives in New York City who, in early 2014, later called Giffin while he was camped in Asulkan Parking on Rodgers Pass, BC, to ask if he could be on a plane for New York within a week to meet with them. Giffin accepted the invitation, which led to the production of Tiny House Nation wherein he and John Weisbarth served as co-hosts and members of a team of co-producers.

=== Operation Tiny Home nonprofit ===
Giffin became not only an advocate for the tiny house movement as part of the overall environmental movement but also a participant in discussions about zoning policy (noting, for example, that zoning laws that limit the use of tiny homes also hamper efforts to improve cities' energy efficiency), affordable housing, and homelessness.

In 2015 he became involved with a nonprofit organization called Operation Tiny Home, which aimed to support the construction of tiny-home villages for homeless veterans. He has since then held workshops for groups of veterans in 16 different states in the United States. The organization's program later expanded to include Native American communities and women's shelters. Giffin also later formed a down-payment assistance program for "local heroes", regardless of military service.

=== Tiny Home Industry Association vice president ===
The Colorado Blueprint 2.0 Initiatives, in collaboration with the Colorado Office of Economic Development and International Trade and under the direction of former Colorado governor John Hickenlooper, supported the launch of the Tiny Home Industry Association (THIA) as a trade organization in 2016. In 2018, Giffin joined the board of the THIA where he would later serve as vice president. In this latter capacity he was invited to speak with the US Secretary of Housing and Urban Development in Washington, DC, at the National Convention of Mayors in Miami, and at the Clinton Presidential Library in Arkansas as a de facto spokesman for the tiny-house movement and minimalism.

=== Operation Tiny Home podcast ===
Weisbarth and Giffin currently broadcasts the Operation Tiny Home podcast.

== Other achievements in media ==
- 2011 – Cover of Powder Magazine (skiing magazine managing-edited by John Bresee)
- 2011-2014 – Director, OR Tiny House Tour
- 2013 – Director, Winter's People
- 2013 – Featured athlete, Valhalla (Sweetgrass Productions)
- 2015 – Featured athlete, Ruin and Rose (Matchstick Productions)
- 2019 – Writer, director and star, Ridge of Dreams

== Personal life ==
Zack Giffin owns a company named Zack Rabbit Tool Company.
