= Cajun Justice =

American reality television series

- Genre: Reality
- Created by: Ken Reichling
- Starring: Vernon Bourgeois, Jr. Paul Thibodeaux; Storm Fitch; Melissa Quintal; Dudley "D.J." Authement; Terry Daigre; Merlin Daigre; LeeAnn Fitch; Desmond Moore; Jacob Lirette
- Country of origin: United States
- Original language: English
- No. of seasons: 1
- No. of episodes: 21

Production
- Executive producers: David McKillop; Ken Arlidge; Ken Reichling; Laura Fleury; Mark Kadin
- Producer: Nathan Novero
- Running time: 20:41
- Production company: MAK Pictures

Original release
- Network: A&E
- Release: June 7 – August 16, 2012

Cajun Justice is an American reality television series on A&E. The series debuted on June 7, 2012.

Despite season one averaging 1.5 million viewers an episode, the newly elected sheriff, Jerry Larpenter, did not agree with the way the series represented his parish. Ken Reichling, creator/executive producer, attempted to keep the show within the parish, and A&E agreed to increase the payment from $1,500 an episode to $10,000 an episode. Larpenter declined the offer.

The Louisiana Auditor's Office reviewed former Sheriff Vernon Bourgeois' spending in relation to 'Cajun Justice' in January 2013.

== Plot summary ==
The show focuses on the experiences of the Terrebonne Parish, Louisiana Sheriff's Office. The show features most members of the sheriff's office, and also has members of the SWAT team, and other law enforcement agencies on the show. Sheriff Vernon Bourgeois and his deputies arrest and deal with numerous suspects, criminals and other citizens. They often have to solve disputes between neighbors, or have to catch people doing illegal acts on the bayou, such as illegally hunting alligators, among other things.

== Episodes ==
No.	Title	Original release date
1	"Bayou Busted"	June 7, 2012
2	"Catfish and Gators"	June 7, 2012
3	"Grave Robbery"	June 14, 2012
4	"Full Moon Madness"	June 14, 2012
5	"A Real Drag"	June 28, 2012
6	"Cursed"	June 28, 2012
7	"Bone in My Swamp"	July 5, 2012
8	"Poached"	July 5, 2012
9	"Lost in the Swamp"	July 12, 2012
10	"Gator Man's Law"	July 12, 2012
11	"Hunt for the Swamp Monster"	July 19, 2012
12	"Mardi Gras"	July 19, 2012
13	"The Great Swamp Escape"	July 26, 2012
14	"Geaux Speed Racers"	July 26, 2012
15	"Bayou Biker Thieves"	August 2, 2012
16	"Bayou Beasts"	August 2, 2012
17	"Swamp Manhunt"	August 9, 2012
18	"Bug Off"	August 9, 2012
19	"Not a Moment Too Soon"	August 9, 2012
20	"Bourgeois' Last Stand, Pt. 1"	August 16, 2012
21	"Bourgeois' Last Stand, Pt. 2"	August 16, 2012
