= FYI (Southeast Asian TV channel) =

- Country: Southeast Asia (except Malaysia and Vietnam)
- Broadcast area: Indonesia; Philippines; South Korea; Singapore; Hong Kong; Myanmar; Thailand; Taiwan
- Headquarters: Singapore

Programming
- Languages: English; Mandarin; Cantonese; Korean; Thai; Indonesian; Malay; Filipino
- Picture format: 16:9 (HDTV)

Ownership
- Owner: A+E Networks Asia
- Sister channels: Crime & Investigation Network; History; H2; Lifetime

History
- Launched: 27 May 2008 (as Bio); 6 October 2014 (as FYI)
- Closed: 14 December 2018 (Malaysia); 30 June 2019 (Thailand, Indonesia and Myanmar); 1 July 2019 (Hong Kong, Taiwan, Singapore, Philippines and South Korea)
- Former names: The Biography Channel (2008–2014)

Links
- Website: fyiasia.tv

FYI (stylized as fyi,) was a Southeast Asian television channel (excluding Malaysia, formerly including Malaysia) dedicating to lifestyle. The channel was launched on May 27, 2008 as Bio. by A+E Networks Asia, a joint-venture between A+E Networks and Astro Holdings Sdn Bhd in Malaysia. On October 6, 2014, Bio. became FYI.

After 11 years of broadcasting, the channel ceased broadcasting on 1 July 2019, after which the channel space created in 2008 by The Biography Channel ceased to exist.

== Final Programming ==
=== FYI Programs ===
- Affairs Gone Wrong
- Aftermath with William Shatner
- Junkie Monastery
- Hoarders
- Shipping Wars
- Confessions: Animal Hoarding
- Barter Kings
- Private Chefs of Beverly Hills
- Storage Wars
- The Quon Dynasty
- Billy The Exterminator
- One Born Every Minute
- Celebrity Close Calls
- Celebrity Nightmares Decoded
- Cursed
- Monster In-Laws
- Intervention
- Celebrity Ghost Stories (Note: Now on Crime + Investigation.)
- Storage Wars: Texas
- Celebrity House Hunting
- Airline USA
- Way Of Broadway
- Confessions: Animal Hoarding
- I Don't Have Time For This
- Hot, Famous and Forty
- Big Fat Gypsy Weddings
- Reno Vs Relocate
- Shipping Wars
- Sell This House
- Paranormal State
- Visionaries: Inside The Creative
- My Little Terror
- Under 21
- Under 21 And Filthy Rich
- Epic Meal Empire
- World Food Championships
- Tiny House Nation (Note: Now on Lifetime.)
- B.O.R.N. to Style
- Rowhouse Showdown
- Lost in Love
- Best in Bridal
- The Coolest Places on Earth

=== Bio Programs ===
- BIO Classroom
- Biography
- My Ghost Story
- My Ghost Story Asia
- My Ghost Story: Caught On Camera
- Hollywood
- Cold Case Files
- Panic 911
- I Survived...
- Ghostly Encounters
- Big Fat Gypsy Weddings
- Child Of Our Time
- Gene Simmons Family Jewels

== See also ==
- A+E Networks
- Crime & Investigation Network Asia
- History Asia
- FYI
