= Jana Bennett =

British media consultant (1955–2022)

Jana Bennett OBE
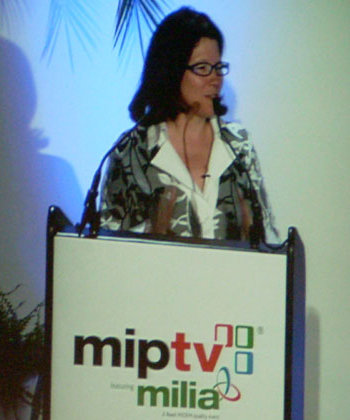
- Born: Jana Eve Bennett; 6 November 1955; Cooperstown, New York, U.S.
- Died: 11 January 2022 (aged 66); Chinnor, Oxfordshire, England
- Education: St Anne's College, Oxford (BA); London School of Economics (MSc)
- Occupation: Media executive
- Employers: BBC (1979–1999; 2002–2012); Discovery Communications (1999–2002); A&E Networks (2012–2017)
- Spouse: Richard Clemmow (m. 1995)
- Children: 2

Jana Eve Bennett OBE (6 November 1955 – 11 January 2022) was an American-born British media consultant; member of the board of the British Library; member of the board of the Headlong Theatre Company. Previously she was President and General Manager of History, and H2 at A+E Networks in New York City. She joined A+E Networks in June 2013 as President of The Biography Channel (later bio) and Lifetime Movie Network. Bio was rebranded as FYI in July 2014.

Prior to joining A+E Networks, she was President of BBC Worldwide Networks and Global BBC iPlayer. In that role she was responsible for BBC Worldwide's television channels, which operate in more than 100 countries, and the development and roll out of the commercial global iPlayer. She was also Worldwide's Managing Director for Latin America with oversight of the company's businesses in the region. She sat on Worldwide's Executive Board and on the Board of UKTV, Britain's second largest pay-TV group. She took up this role in February 2011 moving from the BBC's UK public service where she had been Director of Vision at the BBC from 2006. As Director of BBC Vision, she headed "the largest multi-media production, commissioning and broadcast group of its kind in the world" with overall responsibility for BBC Television and its online services, BBC Films and BBC Productions. Previously she was Director of Television (appointed January 2002). In her two most recent roles at the BBC, Jana Bennett "steered the BBC TV portfolio through its transition into the mainstream digital age." She was the first female director of the BBC, and oversaw the launch of numerous shows, including Strictly Come Dancing, Miranda, and the reinvented Doctor Who franchise. She was previously Executive Vice President and General Manager at Discovery Communications in the US.

Bennett was a member of the governing board of the Pew Research Center. She was also a Governor of the Royal Shakespeare Company and was made a Fellow of the Royal Television Society in 1999.

== Early life and education ==
Bennett was born in Cooperstown, New York on 6 November 1955, the third of five daughters born to Gordon and Elizabeth (née Cushing) Bennett. Her father was an English professor and her mother was a librarian and educator. In 1969, her family moved to England, living in Felpham, where she was educated at Bognor Regis Comprehensive School. She then studied philosophy, politics and economics at St Anne's College, Oxford, where she was in a band with future Prime Minister Tony Blair. She undertook post-graduate studies at the London School of Economics where she was awarded an MSc (Dist) for her work on strategic analysis and international and defence studies.

== BBC career ==
In 1979, Bennett won a place on the BBC News trainee scheme, and began her first period of employment with the corporation working on radio and television news; BBC Newcastle's Look North and Radio Sheffield. She worked on Nationwide, The Money Programme and Newsnight. She became a producer of Panorama in 1986, and co-authored The Disappeared: Voices from a Secret War with the BBC's diplomatic editor John Simpson about the actions of Argentina's military government during the same year. In 1990, she became editor of the BBC's science documentary series Horizon. One of her most successful episodes was "Death of the Iceman", about a body retrieved from a glacier which turned out to be the oldest frozen mummy ever to be found. Awards she won during this period included the 1991 News and Documentary Emmy for her role as Executive Producer of the film "Suicide Mission to Chernobyl" which also aired on the WGBH program Nova in the United States.

In 1994, she was appointed the BBC's Head of Science, the first woman to take that role. She initially didn't believe she would get the job, as she was heavily pregnant when she interviewed for the post. Under her leadership, the department expanded the range and ambition of its programming, winning awards for series such as Walking with Dinosaurs, The Human Body and Meet The Ancestors and business formats such as Blood on the Carpet, Back to the Floor and the medical format Trust Me, I'm a Doctor. She introduced a new animal genre to UK television with the highly successful and long-running Animal Hospital, alongside live events such as Hospitalwatch. The science department also pioneered content rich web sites and was one of the first areas to use email inside the BBC. She joined the BBC's Board of Management in 1997 as Director of Production, then became Director of Programmes for the former BBC Production division until she left the BBC to join Discovery Communications as General Manager of the TLC channel in August 1999. She was appointed an OBE in 2000 for her work in science broadcasting.

== Discovery Communications ==
At TLC Bennett transformed the channel's ratings and revenue performance. She introduced a new editorial direction under the slogan "Life Unscripted" which included reality-drama and interior design shows, some of them based on popular British formats. The audience success of shows like Trading Spaces, and Junkyard Wars exemplified a shift in programming towards more mass-appeal shows. Ratings rose under her leadership.

== Later BBC career ==
In 2002, Bennett returned to the UK to take the job of Director of Television. In this capacity she took charge of the launch and expansion of the BBC's portfolio of 7 digital TV channels: BBC Three, BBC Four, HD TV and the children's channels, CBBC and CBeebies. This included winning the approval of the government for the launch of BBC Three, the corporation's youth orientated digital television channel, which at the time was considered by some to be a controversial development for the BBC.

In 2006 the BBC's Director-General, Mark Thompson reorganised the BBC's divisional structure, creating BBC Vision from the amalgamation of the corporation's Television, Drama Entertainment & Children's and Factual & Learning divisions. Bennett was promoted from Director of Television to Director of Vision taking "overall creative and leadership responsibility" for the commissioning, production and scheduling of television, video and online content across the BBC's analogue and digital television networks (excluding the BBC News and Parliament channels), the web, mobile phones and interactive technology.

During Bennett's tenure, BBC television was responsible for natural history landmarks, such as Life, worldwide entertainment hits, including Strictly Come Dancing, The Apprentice and Top Gear; new comedy formats, such as Outnumbered and Gavin & Stacey. Dramas ranged from period classics like Cranford to contemporary pieces such as Criminal Justice and Occupation, from science fiction in the shape of Torchwood and Doctor Who to detective series such as Life on Mars, Wallander and Sherlock.

Bennett's division was also heavily involved in the planning and launch of the corporation's on-demand service, BBC iPlayer, providing 400 hours content for the service each week. In a speech to the Royal Television Society in 2007, she articulated a fresh approach to the BBC's mission to inform and educate in the digital era. She also championed new multi-media approaches to major fundraising entertainment events. In partnership with Comic Relief, the BBC produced the first truly digital Red Nose Day in 2009.

She implemented the BBC's out of London strategy for commissioning and production. In 2010, she launched the BBC's year of science across television, radio and online. In the same year she established BBC One HD, and also announced a major new Shakespeare Season.

In addition to the BBC branded television channels, as Director of Vision, Bennett had responsibility for feature film production through BBC Films, whose credits include Oscar-winning Man on Wire as well as BAFTA award-winners Mrs Brown, An Education, In the Loop, Fish Tank and StreetDance 3D, the first 3D film produced outside the US. Bennett was appointed to BBC Worldwide as President, Worldwide Networks and Global iPlayer in February 2011. Bennett left BBC Worldwide in 2012 following a reorganisation of the company.

== A+E Networks ==
In June 2012, Bennett was appointed President of The Biography Channel (bio) and Lifetime Movie Network (LMN) at A+E Networks in New York. She served in this role until 2017.

== Personal life and death ==
Bennett was a member of the International Academy of Television Arts and Sciences' Executive Committee and of the Advisory Board of the Oxford University Museum of Natural History. She was a trustee of Comic Relief, on the board of OurBrainBank UK, and fellow of the Royal Television Society. She was on the board of Women in Film and Television and in 2011 and 2012 she was included in the WFTV power list.

In 1995, Bennett married Richard Clemmow, an editor and fellow media executive. The couple had two children.

In May 2019, Bennett was diagnosed with glioblastoma, a kind of brain tumour. She died at her home in Chinnor, Oxfordshire, on 11 January 2022, at the age of 66.

== Bibliography ==
- Bennett, Jana; Simpson, John (1986). The Disappeared: Story of Argentina's Secret War of Oppression. Sphere. ISBN 0722178751.
