= Teenage Girls (EP) =

- Teenage Girls (EP)

EP by Love Kills
- Released: December 2006
- Genre: Alternative, garage rock
- Length: 10:29
- Label: Indie
- Producer: Pat Rijd

Love Kills chronology
She'll Break Your Heart E.P. (2006)	Teenage Girls (2006)	Carry Me Home (EP) (2007)

Teenage Girls is a recording by Toronto alternative rock band Love Kills released in December 2006 (independent).

== Track listing ==
1. Teenage Girls (Rijd) – 2:23
2. Little Angel (Rijd) – 2:34
3. All Mine (Rijd) – 3:04
4. Hot Summer Night (Rijd) – 2:28

== Credits ==
- Heather Flood – vocals, tambourine
- Pat Rijd – guitar, vocals
- Tom Flood – guitar, effects
- Mark Bergshoeff – bass guitar
- Jay Talsma – drums
