= She'll Break Your Heart =

She'll Break Your Heart E.P.

EP by Love Kills
- Released: May 2006
- Genre: Alternative, garage rock
- Length: 23:08
- Label: Independent
- Producer: Pat Rijd

Love Kills chronology
| She'll Break Your Heart E.P. (2006) | Teenage Girls (2006) |

Professional ratings
Review scores
| Source | Rating |
|---|---|
| Exclaim! Magazine | Favorable link |

She'll Break Your Heart is the debut EP from Toronto alternative rock band, Love Kills. Released in May 2006, the record received airplay on CBC Radio, as well as a positive review from Toronto music publication, Exclaim! magazine. The EP was recorded, written, and produced by the band's guitarist, and vocalist, Pat Rijd in the band's Toronto project-studio.

== Track listing ==
1. "Ready to Go" – 2:07
2. "Adeline" – 2:41
3. "She'll Break Your Heart" – 3:23
4. "Bad Time" – 3:02
5. "Jamie" – 3:25
6. "It Feels So Right" – 5:15
7. "Two Hearts" – 3:19

== Credits ==
(Words and music by P. Rijd)

- Heather Flood – vocals, tambourine
- Pat Rijd – guitar, vocals
- Tom Flood – guitar, effects
- Mark Bergshoeff – bass guitar
- Jay Talsma – drums
