= Love Kills (band) =

Canadian alternative rock band

- Origin: Toronto, Ontario, Canada
- Genres: Alternative rock, Shoegaze, Garage rock
- Years active: 2005–2009
- Members: Heather Flood; Pat Rijd; Tom Flood; Mark Bergshoeff; Jay Talsma

Love Kills was a Canadian alternative rock band from Toronto, Ontario, Canada, which formed in 2005, with lead guitarist, vocalist, and chief songwriter Pat Rijd, lead vocalist Heather Flood, brother and guitarist Tom Flood, bassist Mark Bergshoeff, and drummer Jay Talsma. The band have been variously classified as shoegaze, surf rock, and garage rock.

== History ==
Love Kills's first release was May 2006's She'll Break Your Heart, a seven-song EP. The EP was produced and distributed independently, but gained a following within the Toronto indie music scene, with selections from the EP being aired on CBC Radio One's All In A Day program.

The band's second release was December 2006's Teenage Girls, a four-song EP which was released on December 19, 2006, to coincide with their Nu Music Nite appearance at the Horseshoe Tavern.

Love Kills's last releases were 2007's Carry Me Home which saw the addition of two cellists to their five-piece electric line-up, and the digital single "Angie Oh Angie (I'm Losing My Mind)" which also featured a cover of Simon & Garfunkel's "The Only Living Boy in New York".

The band has been largely inactive since 2009, but reunited for a gig at Rancho Relaxo in January 2013. Pat Rijd released a solo album in 2013 under the name "The Dayflowers" entitled Streetcorner Sympathy.
