= Jerry Larpenter =

American police officer

Jerry Joseph Larpenter was the former sheriff and tax collector of Terrebonne Parish, Louisiana. He died on June 18, 2025, at approximately 8am at Terrebonne General Medical Center in Houma, Louisiana.

In August 2016, it was reported that Larpenter's deputies raided the residence of a local anti-corruption blogger on criminal defamation charges after posts examining the business relationships of local parish politicians. The anti-corruption blogger claimed that an insurance contract for parish government was awarded without going through a public bid process and without a required ordinance. Local newspaper The Daily Comet pointed out that Larpenter's wife is employed by the same insurance business.

On August 25, 2016, the Louisiana First Circuit Court of Appeals quashed the search warrant use in the raid of the anti-corruption blogger because the warrant lacked probable cause of a criminally actionable offense.

In July 2017, a judge for the US District Court in Louisiana handed down a ruling that strips Larpenter of immunity in the lawsuit brought against him by the local anti-corruption blogger for violating her rights.

In August 2017, Larpenter settled the civil suit filed against him by the local anti-corruption blogger, who had previous received $50,000 from Terrebonne Parish President Gordon Dove for his role in the case.

In March 2019, Larpenter announced that he would not seek re-election, leaving office at the end of his term in June 2020.

A political opponent previously accused Larpenter of using parish government money for personal expenses, such as hunting trips.
