= Panic 911 =

- Genre: Documentary
- Country of origin: United States
- Original language: English
- No. of seasons: 3
- No. of episodes: 22

Production
- Executive producers: Anne S. Rothwell; Brad Holcman; David McKillop; Elaine Frontain Bryant; Rebecca Toth Diefenbach; Valerie Haselton Drescher
- Running time: 60 minutes (with commercials)
- Production company: Sirens Media

Original release
- Network: A&E
- Release: November 29, 2012 – present

Panic 911 (also stylized as PANIC 9-1-1) is an American documentary television series that airs on A&E and debuted on November 29, 2012. A second season began airing on August 8, 2013.

PANIC 9-1-1 returned for a third season on June 25, 2022. The one-hour docudrama aired Saturdays at 10:00 p.m. ET (9:00 p.m. CT).

== Premise ==
The docudrama series follows and reenacts the events of real 9-1-1 calls, including actual audio. The urgent life-and-death situations unfold between emergency dispatchers and frantic callers. Within each episode, the 9-1-1 call narrates what is happening, while interviews with those involved are also included with their first-hand details.

Each episode opens with the following:

These stories are based on actual 9-1-1 calls, some of which have been edited for dramatic purposes. They contain dramatizations of certain events.

According to A&E: PANIC 9-1-1 is an innovative series featuring dramatic 9-1-1 calls as they play out in “real time”. Three calls per episode deliver nail-biting tension, bone-chilling dread, courage and heroism while capturing raw and inspiring tales of humanity. First-person interviews, graphics and recreations further help bring the calls to life.

== Episodes ==
=== Season 1 (2012) ===
No. overall	No. in season	Title	Original release date	U.S. viewers (millions)
1	1	"I Need You to Put the Gun Down"	November 29, 2012	1.62
In the series debut, a mother debates whether to use her gun on a suspected rapist. A grandmother is in panic when she's faced with a burglar at her residence. A gunman holds a sporting goods retail store hostage.
2	2	"He Told Me I Was Going to Die Today"	December 6, 2012	1.32
An obsessed previous love interest comes back to get revenge on his past lover, which leads to a high speed pursuit. Two females in Indiana are put into danger when they stand on an unstable frozen lake. A pregnant woman in Denver is assaulted by a stalker.
3	3	"I Plan on Leaving Here in a Body Bag"	December 13, 2012	1.47
A man abducts his previous wife, and holds her hostage due to unresolved issues. A mentally unstable man opens fire on a suburban neighborhood in Ohio. A widow in California carefully contacts police, when an unknown burglar attempts to discover a way into her house.

=== Season 2 (2013) ===
No. overall	No. in season	Title	Original release date	U.S. viewers (millions)
4	1	"He's in My Room"	August 8, 2013	1.18
A mother and son are trapped inside a closet after a burglar makes his way into their home. A pair of teenagers, who are enjoying their spring break, are key witnesses to a car crash. A hiker ends up buried in the snow.
5	2	"I'm Gonna Shoot Your Head Off"	August 15, 2013	1.31
A customer attempts to acquire weapons from inside a sporting goods store. Two teenagers exploring are trapped after an ice cave collapses. An employee and a customer, at a tanning salon, are met with an armed robbery suspect.
6	3	"I Don't Want to Die Like This"	August 22, 2013	1.11
A young woman calls for help, when she sees two men crawl over her back fence. An Amber alert helps a woman spot a child and his kidnapper. A man with a machete forces his way into his ex-wife's home.
7	4	"Get Out of the Van and Run"	August 29, 2013	1.34
A cab driver calls 9-1-1 after she's met with a violent passenger. A teenager is woken up at home after an intruder enters with weapons. A pregnant woman ends up trapped in a fire.
8	5	"I'm in the Back of a Truck"	September 5, 2013	1.18
Two masked burglars make their way into a man's residence. A college student calls for help after her ex-boyfriend abducts her. A woman is hiding in her closet after a man breaks into her home.
9	6	"I Don't Want to Shoot a Gun"	September 12, 2013	1.25
A 12-year-old girl grabs her parents' gun when a burglar makes his way in. A kidnapping spills over into a nearby residence and quickly turns violent. An elderly couple make a call for help and shoot an intruder that breaks into their home.

=== Season 3 (2022) ===
PANIC 9-1-1 returned for a third season in June 2022, with thirteen episodes airing on A&E, between June 6 and September 3.

No. overall	No. in season	Title	Original release date	U.S. viewers (millions)
10	1	"I'm Dying"	June 25, 2022	N/A
A Florida woman fights for her life when her estranged husband starts shooting through the door. A young mother finds herself in a terrifying situation when her brakes stop working on a busy highway during a holiday weekend. A Georgia couple hear screaming in the woods near their home and discover an abandoned baby.
11	2	"There Is a Gun to Her Back"	July 2, 2022	N/A
A middle-aged woman holds an Ohio fast food restaurant manager hostage. In Florida, first responders scramble to locate a young woman who flipped her car into a flooded ditch before she drowns. A married couple in Ohio defend themselves after an intruder enters their home in the middle of the night.
12	3	"I Can't Get Out of the House"	July 9, 2022	N/A
In Oregon, a young woman hides in a closet as an intruder enters her home. After a fire breaks out, two Oklahoma City women become trapped in their apartment's breezeway by a wall of flames. In Virginia, a woman and her daughter try to fight off an erratic carjacker.
13	4	"That Was Your Final Warning"	July 16, 2022	N/A
In Florida, a car chase transpires to rescue a hostage being held at gunpoint in her ex-boyfriend's car. After being shocked by 14,000 volts of electricity, a Georgia man's chance of survival is in the hands of his friend. A mother of three stands her ground in her Michigan home while two men break-in during the night.
14	5	"They Have Guns"	July 23, 2022	N/A
A young Ohio woman calls 911 from under her bed while her family is held hostage by armed home invaders. Police rush to rescue a woman trapped in her burning car in Georgia. A kidnapper tries to steal a mother's young child at a gas station in New Mexico.
15	6	"I'm Dying and I Love Him"	July 30, 2022	N/A
Rescuers struggle to reach a bride-to-be and her friend as their overturned SUV fills with water during Oklahoma's tornado season. An 11-year-old girl and her younger brother are stuck in the bedroom of their burning North Carolina home. An armed neighbor rushes to confront a trespasser inside his neighbor's garage in Florida.
16	7	"They're Coming"	August 6, 2022	N/A
An 11-year-old boy is home alone when a group of robbers breaks into his house in Florida. A Good Samaritan races against time to save a driver from a burning car in Utah. A couple is stuck on a boat which clings to the edge of a dam in Illinois.
17	8	"I Don't Know What To Do"	August 13, 2022	N/A
A woman hides in her bathroom when a strange man breaks into her Florida home in the middle of the night. A man is stuck in his overturned pickup which is quickly filling with water in Michigan. A woman is trapped inside her bedroom as a tornado rips through her Texas mobile home.
18	9	"Hurry I'm Scared"	August 27, 2022	N/A
Two young sisters hide in a closet as strangers break into their Tennessee home. A man is bleeding to death after his leg is amputated by a baler in Florida. A woman is trapped in her car as her engine is on fire in Washington.
19	10	"I'm Scared to Death"	August 27, 2022	N/A
A neighboring young North Carolina couple witnesses a young man attack his family, before he turns his attention to them. A 15-year-old girl clings to a branch as an aggressive mother alligator lurks below in Florida. A couple wakes in the middle of the night to find their Indiana home engulfed by flames.
20	11	"He's Standing in Front of Me"	September 3, 2022	N/A
A suspected gunman takes a Michigan coach bus hostage, and the driver is not stopping. Rescuers race against time to save a snowboarder stranded by an avalanche in Utah. A young girl is unresponsive after falling into her backyard pool in Florida.
21	12	"I'm Hanging On"	September 3, 2022	N/A
A woman's vengeful ex-husband breaks into her Arkansas home and a firefight ensues. A man fights for his life as he falls through ice into a freezing river in New Hampshire. The search heats up for an angry ex-boyfriend who has just kidnapped his young child in Virginia.
22	13	"He's Hitting Me Head On"	September 3, 2022	N/A
A man and his daughter flee from an aggressive driver intent on exacting deadly revenge in North Carolina. A man clings to life as he is impaled by a metal pole after a car accident in Texas. A gunman holds two people hostage in an Oklahoma office building with an unusual demand.
