= Tiny House Hunting =

American reality television series

- Genre: Reality television
- Country of origin: United States
- Original language: English
- No. of seasons: 3
- No. of episodes: 49

Original release
- Network: FYI
- Release: December 22, 2014 – October 28, 2017

Tiny House Hunting is an American reality television series that premiered on the FYI cable channel on December 22, 2014. The series features real estate agents helping people who desire to live a tiny house with their families in response to tiny house movement. The show accompanies Tiny House Nation and Tiny House World, another series about tiny homes aired on the same network.

"We’ve done a lot of research into social trends, both for these shows and the network in general," said Gena McCarthy, a vice president of network's programming. "And what we found is that although there are all age groups involved, the tiny-house movement is mostly a social movement created for millennials," she also added before the show's premiere.
