= Carry Me Home (Love Kills EP) =

Carry Me Home (EP)

EP by Love Kills
- Released: May 2007
- Genre: Alternative, shoegaze
- Length: 20:49
- Label: Indie
- Producer: P. Rijd

Love Kills chronology
Teenage Girls (EP) (2006)	Carry Me Home (EP) (2007)

Carry Me Home (EP) is the third EP recording by Toronto indie rock band Love Kills. Released May 2007 (independent), the EP's 6 songs are unique in that they are all accompanied by scored cello duets, attempting to mesh with the band's usual fuzz and feedback palette.

== Track listing ==
1. Suicide - 3:37
2. Carry Me Home - 3:44
3. It's Leaving Me Down - 2:41
4. Now Caroline - 3:40
5. Let It Roll - 2:28
6. Give Me Something I Can Love - 4:34

(all songs by Pat Rijd)

== Credits ==
- Heather Flood - vocals, tambourine
- Pat Rijd - guitar, vocals
- Tom Flood - guitar, effects
- Mark Bergshoeff - bass guitar
- Jay Talsma - drums
- Gary Simkins - cello
- Claire Burrows - cello
