= Carry Me Home (Sweeplings song) =

"Carry Me Home": 2015 song by the Sweeplings

- Cover art for the acoustic version of the Sweeplings' "Carry Me Home"

Single by The Sweeplings

from the album Rise & Fall
- Released: 2015; 2018 (acoustic version)
- Genre: Pop; folk
- Length: 2:52
- Label: Self-release (2015); Nettwerk (2018 re-release)
- Songwriter(s): Cami Bradley; Whitney Dean

"Carry Me Home" is a 2015 song by American folk-pop duo the Sweeplings. The song premiered on NPR in July 2015, and was released as part of the album Rise & Fall in August. The song was later used as the backdrop for the official trailer for the final season of the Netflix series Longmire.

== History ==
=== Composition and lyrical interpretation ===
"Carry Me Home" was written by singer-songwriters Cami Bradley and Whitney Dean, known collectively as the Sweeplings. The song is about the loss of loved ones, "written from the perspective of the one leaving." Lyrics include "Lay down my bones knowing I'll be in a better place/Release my soul, carry me home".

=== Releases ===
NPR premiered "Carry Me Home" in July 2015; its official release came in August with the Sweeplings' debut album Rise & Fall. When the Sweeplings signed with Nettwerk in 2018, they offered an acoustic version of the song ahead of the deluxe version re-release of the album.

=== Other appearances ===
The official trailer for the final season of the Netflix series Longmire is set to "Carry Me Home".

== Reception ==
"Dean and Bradley float across vast landscapes of dusty tones" for the song, wrote Popdust, which also rated Rise & Fall as its No. 15 album of 2015 on the strength of key tracks including "Carry Me Home". NPR likened the song to Dean's previous work with John Paul White of The Civil Wars, calling it "a dark, expansive piece of rootsy pop, and Dean and Bradley are more subtle players" than White and Joy Williams. iTunes placed "Carry Me Home" on its list of the 25 best singer-songwriter tracks of 2015.
