= FYI (American TV channel) =

American pay television channel

- Country: United States
- Broadcast area: Nationwide
- Headquarters: Newark, New Jersey

Programming
- Language: English
- Picture format: 1080i (HDTV)

Ownership
- Owner: A+E Global Media
- Sister channels: A&E; History Channel; Lifetime; LMN

History
- Launched: November 16, 1998; 27 years ago
- Former names: The Biography Channel (1998–2014)

Links
- Website: www.fyi.tv

Availability

Streaming media
- Service(s): Philo, Sling TV, Frndly TV, Vidgo, Hulu + Live TV

FYI (stylized as fyi,) is an American basic cable channel owned by A+E Global Media, a unit of Hearst Communications, formerly a joint-venture of the Walt Disney Company (each owned 50% until 2026). The network features lifestyle programming, with a mix of reality, culinary, home renovation and makeover series.

The network originally launched in 1998 as The Biography Channel, an offshoot of A&E named after its television series Biography. As such, it originally featured factual programs, such as reruns of its namesake series. As A&E shifted its focus towards reality and drama series, the Biography Channel became the home for several series that had been displaced by the flagship network (including Biography itself), but shifted towards reality-oriented series itself in 2007 and was rebranded as simply Bio. In 2014, the channel was rebranded as FYI, an initialism for "for your information".

As of November 2023, FYI is available to approximately 35,000,000 pay television households in the United States-down from its 2015 peak of 73,000,000 households.

== History ==
=== The Biography Channel ===
1998–2001 logo

2001–2007 logo

2007–2014 logo

The channel was launched on November 16, 1998, as The Biography Channel by A&E Television Networks, which conceived the channel as an offshoot of the long-running A&E profile series Biography. On October 1, 2000, A&E Networks expanded its British partnership with British Sky Broadcasting with the launch of a UK market Biography Channel.

In August 2006, The Biography Channel became the exclusive home for the Biography series, as it was dropped by A&E. Another 64 hours of the show was ordered for its first year on the channel. In 2007, Biography Channel unveiled a new on-air brand—identifying the network simply as "Bio". The changes came as the network shifted its scope to de-emphasize traditional biographical programs in favor of "true stories about fascinating people", such as the series Shatner's Raw Nerve, hosted by William Shatner.

Bio had been stagnating since A+E's 2013 upfront presentation as little focus was placed upon it. Bio was generating 12 cents per subscriber from the video provider, about half the industry average. After tweaking the three main A+E channels, Bio averaged viewers of 91,000 adults 25–54 in prime compared to what A&E (716,000) and History (703,000) managed over the same period. Jana Bennett was hired as president of LMN and Bio in June 2013 and, having transformed TLC from an educational channel to a lifestyle network, was considered an indication that adding a lifestyle channel to the A+E portfolio was a possibility. An opening in the genre occurred as the Style Network became the men-focused Esquire Network. While preparing to launch FYI, Bio began re-airing A&E's house-flipping shows and 30 potential shows were placed in development.

=== As FYI (2014–present) ===
In December 2013, A+E Networks announced that The Biography Channel would be rebranded as FYI, a contemporary lifestyle network, starting in mid 2014. By February, FYI had a slate of six new series including three food series, two home design series, and one style series, with other shows also in development, including pilot orders of Red Hot Design starring Shasta Smith, and Jennifer's Way. In April, Midnight Feast was greenlit for the new channel while two others—Say it to my face and Reverse Course—were ordered to pilot.

With the June 2014 announcement of the 2015 end of the ABC Owned Television Stations-run subscription network Live Well Network, some of its programming was being offered to FYI, which shared partial ABC ownership. The network launched on July 7, 2014, with a preview special, FYI: First Look, featuring previews of the network's new programming. Its first new original series, Married at First Sight, premiered the next day.

In January 2015, following the success of its Six Months Later special, FYI ordered Married at First Sight: The First Year.

== Programming ==
=== Current programming ===
- Billy the Exterminator
- Counting Cars
- Dr. David Jeremiah
- Duck Dynasty
- Ice Road Truckers
- Joni Table Talk
- The Equalizer
- The King of Queens
- Mountain Men
- Shipping Wars
- Storage Wars
- Tiny House Nation

=== Former FYI ===
- Epic Meal Empire Today – produced by The Collective and Nexttime Productions, based on the Epic Meal Time YouTube show. It was renamed to its current name in 2020.
- World Food Championships – coverage produced by Sharp Entertainment
- #BlackLove
- Tiny House Hunting
- Tiny House World
- B.O.R.N. to Style – produced by Left/Right; features style makeovers at the Harlem-based boutique, B.O.R.N. (Borrowed, Old, Refurbished, and New).
- Rowhouse Showdown – produced by Jane Street Entertainment in which three teams compete to increase the house and neighborhood value via the renovation of an "identical urban homes in dilapidated neighborhoods".
- Lost in Love
- Man vs Child: Chef Showdown
- Best in Bridal
- Married at First Sight – based on a Danish show of the same name in which three couples, paired up by four experts (Pepper Schwartz, Greg Epstein, Dr. Logan Levkoff, and Dr. Joseph Cilona), agree to get married when they first meet.
- Married At First Sight: The First Year (January 15, 2015)
- Zombie House Flipping – follows Justin Stamper and his team of house renovators in Orlando, Florida. A "Zombie House" is an industry term for a rundown home that is devaluing a neighborhood. Stamper and his team, Ashlee Casserly (realtor), Keith Ori (builder), and Peter Duke (designer), search for such homes and renovate them. The show first aired on January 30, 2016, and ran for eight episodes. It has continued for five seasons, through 2022.
- Scraps – follows chef Joel Gamoran as he travels across the U.S. creating meals in unexpected places, using food waste and scraps.
- Plant-Based by Nafsika
- Waterfront House Hunting
- Miss USA
- Miss Universe
- Sell This House!
- Food Factory
- Celebrity House Hunting

=== In production ===
- The Feed – produced by Giants Pirates with Top Chef judge Gail Simmons, The Taste judge Marcus Samuelsson and comedian and food-blogger Max Silvestri as a traveling road show looking into the American food culture and its new trends. Originally to be a launch program (on July 12, 2014), The Feed was pushed back to a summer start.
- Midnight Feast – produced by Nerd TV and hosted by Chef Spike Mendelsohn; a competitive cooking show in which three chefs use New York's Chelsea Market as an ingredient source, where the winning chef gets a cash prize while the losers pay their grocery bills.

=== In development ===
- Red Hot Design – features a team led by designer and artist Shasta Smith making upscale art and furniture from unusual materials and produced by Cineflix Productions.
- Jennifer's Way – produced by Atlas Media; features Jennifer Esposito, an actress who entered the food business with a gluten-free bakery, as she attempts to expand beyond the single NYC location into cookbooks, packaged goods and franchised locations.
- Say It To My Face – produced by Pie Town Productions; restaurant owners and chefs and their online critics meet to defend their position. Then under the aid of co-hosts Andrew Gruel and Anthony Dispensa, the restaurant gets a makeover.
- Reverse Course – produced by Stick Figure Studios and hosted by chef and restaurateur Sam Talbot; from the finished meal then going in reverse to cooking, preparation and local sourcing.

=== Final Bio programming ===
- Alien Encounters
- Biography
- Celebrity Ghost Stories
- Gangsters: America's Most Evil
- Ghost Bait
- Haunted History
- Mobsters
- Sell This House

==== Former Bio ====
- Cold Case Files (repeats) profiles serial killers
- Notorious, child murdering mothers

== International versions of Bio and FYI ==
Despite the relaunch, international versions of The Biography Channel exist in some regions. An international version of The Biography Channel previously operated in the United Kingdom and Ireland, Israel, Germany, Spain, Portugal, Latin America, and Southeast Asia, but has since been replaced by other channels. The Australian channel was closed in 2015. The Canadian version, operated under license by Rogers Media, was relaunched as Viceland in February 2016, but was then shut down on March 31, 2018.

- Canada: As part of a licensing agreement with Shaw Media, their lifestyle channel, Twist TV, was rebranded as a Canadian version of FYI in September 2014. It was shut down on December 31, 2019.
- Latin America: The Latin American version aired the same programming and used the same logo as the former U.S. flagship channel and it was operated by the HBO Latin America Group subsidiary of Time Warner under a brand licensing agreement with A&E Networks. In July 2014, The Biography Channel was replaced by H2.
- Bio in United Kingdom and Ireland: A British version of Bio was launched on October 1, 2000, and ceased operations on November 4, 2013, being replaced by a British version Lifetime. The channel was also available in Ireland, the Netherlands and Belgium.
- Spain and Portugal: Bio in Spain and Portugal launched on January 13, 2005 and was replaced by A&E on October 2, 2014.
- Germany: Bio in Germany was replaced by A&E in September 2014.
- Israel: Bio is known as ערוץ ביוגרפיה in Israel. In September 2014, the channel was replaced by Lifetime.
- Bio in South East Asia was replaced by FYI in October 2014. FYI was shut down on July 1, 2019.
- India: FYI TV18 was launched in July 2016 as the second channel in the partnership between A&E Networks and TV18, the first being History TV18. The network was closed on July 8, 2020.
- Bio. Australia: The channel was known as The Biography Channel, then as Bio., until it closed in November 2015.
