= History (Southeast Asian TV channel) =

Asian television channel

- Country: Singapore; Indonesia; Thailand; Malaysia; Philippines; Vietnam; Japan; South Korea; Hong Kong; Taiwan
- Broadcast area: Cambodia; Fiji; Hong Kong; Indonesia; Japan; Macau; Malaysia; Maldives; Mongolia; Myanmar; Pacific Islands; Palau; Papua New Guinea; Philippines; Singapore; South Korea; Taiwan; Thailand; Vietnam
- Headquarters: Singapore

Programming
- Languages: English; Chinese (Mandarin/Cantonese); Japanese; Korean; Thai; Vietnamese; Indonesian; Malay; Filipino
- Picture format: 1080i HDTV

Ownership
- Owner: A+E Networks Asia
- Sister channels: Fyi (2008-2019); Crime & Investigation Network; H2; Lifetime

History
- Launched: 15 June 2007; 19 years ago
- Closed: 28 February 2021; 5 years ago (Malaysia) (SD); 1 April 2022; 4 years ago (Brunei)
- Former names: The History Channel (2007–2008)

Links
- Website: www.historyasia.com

History, formerly known as The History Channel, is a Southeast Asian pay television channel broadcasting programming related to historical events and people. The channel is owned by A+E Networks Asia. In India History TV18 owned by a joint-venture between A+E Networks and under permission registered Discovery Communications, owner of the American History and Network 18, Indian media group & available in eight languages (Bengali, English, Gujarati, Hindi, Marathi, Tamil, Telugu & Urdu) in India.

== Company ==
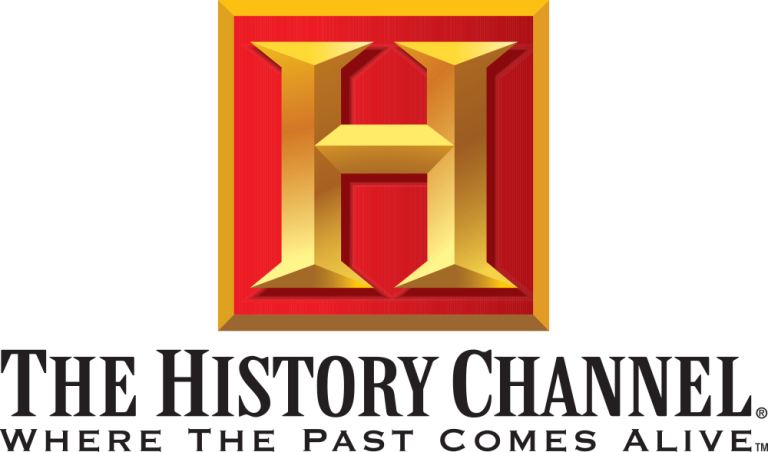
The History Channel's original logo, used from 15 June 2007 to 2008.

A+E Networks Asia was formed on 15 June 2007 through a joint venture between A+E Networks and Malaysia's pay TV provider Astro. Headquartered in Singapore, A+E Networks Asia also have operations in Kuala Lumpur, Malaysia.

History's logo, used from 2008 to 2015; the new logo does not have the triangle on the side of the H.

In 2009, A+E Networks Asia struck a US$800,000 co-production deal with the National Film Development Corporation of Malaysia to co-produce programmes to be featured across its channels. In 2011, it hired SPE Networks as a regional ad sales representative across the South East Asian region.

On June 10, 2013, Ride N' Seek, a travel adventure series, premiered on the channel.

== High-definition feed ==
On September 1, 2008, History Channel Asia officially launched their own History HD Asia channel in Singapore and Hong Kong, followed by Japan, South Korea (Localized Version Launched), India, Philippines and Malaysia.

== Programming ==
=== New ===
- Alone
- Big Easy Motors
- Counting Cars
- Doomsday: 10 Ways The World Will End
- Forged in Fire
- Gangland Undercover
- Pawn Stars
- Storage Wars
- Six
- Vikings

=== Reruns ===
- Duck Dynasty
- Photo Face-Off
- The Pickers
- Top Shot
- Swamp People
- Kings of Restoration
- Cajun Pawn Stars
- Axe Men
- The Innovators: The Men Who Built America
- Ancient Aliens
- America's Book Of Secrets
- Modern Marvels
- Serial Killer Earth
- Stan Lee's Superhumans
- Top Guns
- IRT Deadliest Roads
- Mankind The Story of All of Us
- Storage Wars: Texas

== See also ==
- A+E Networks
- Bio Asia
- Crime & Investigation Network Asia
- History (U.S. TV channel)
