= Tiny House Nation =

American reality television series

- Genre: Reality
- Presented by: John Weisbarth; Zack Giffin
- Country of origin: United States
- Original language: English
- No. of seasons: 5
- No. of episodes: 83

Production
- Executive producers: Nick Rigg; David George; Jordana Hochman; Tennessee Edwards; Gena McCarthy; James Bolosh
- Production company: Loud TV

Original release
- Network: FYI (Seasons 1-4); A&E (Season 5)
- Release: July 9, 2014 – September 28, 2019

Tiny House Nation is an American reality television series. It is a tiny house movement-inspired series which features renovation experts John Weisbarth and Zack Giffin who assist families around the country building their desired houses that are no bigger than 500 square feet (46 m^{2}). The series premiered on July 9, 2014, on the FYI network. After the fourth season, the series began airing on FYI's parent network: A&E. The second half of season 5 was burned off with a 9 AM timeslot on Saturdays.

Tiny House Nation began streaming on Netflix in August 2019.

As of November 2020, National Geographic began airing Tiny House Nation in syndication.

== Episodes ==
=== Season 1 (2014) ===
| No. overall | No. in season | Title | Original release date | Prod. code |
|---|---|---|---|---|
| 1 | 1 | "172 Sq. Ft. Dream Castle" | July 9, 2014 | 102 |
| 2 | 2 | "336 Sq. Ft. River Escape" | July 16, 2014 | 103 |
| 3 | 3 | "210 Sq. Ft. Rochester Studio Retreat" | July 23, 2014 | 104 |
| 4 | 4 | "220 Sq. Ft. Bohemian Escape" | July 30, 2014 | 105 |
| 5 | 5 | "500 Sq. Ft. Rocky Mountain Mansion" | August 13, 2014 | 106 |
| 6 | 6 | "493 Sq. Ft. Vermont Chalet" | August 20, 2014 | 107 |
| 7 | 7 | "150 Sq. Ft. Mobile Bachelor Pad" | September 3, 2014 | 101 |
| 8 | 8 | "207 Sq. Ft. Minnesota Prairie Cottage" | September 10, 2014 | 108 |

=== Season 2 (2014-15) ===
| No. overall | No. in season | Title | Original release date | Prod. code |
|---|---|---|---|---|
| 9 | 1 | "264 Sq. Ft. Honeymoon Suite" | December 22, 2014 | 201 |
| 10 | 2 | "192 Sq. Ft. Launch Pad" | December 29, 2014 | 202 |
| 11 | 3 | "204 Sq. Ft. Climbing Gym" | January 5, 2015 | 203 |
| 12 | 4 | "275 Sq. Ft. Nomad's Nest" | January 19, 2015 | 204 |
| 13 | 5 | "224 Sq. Ft. Entertaining Abode" | January 26, 2015 | 205 |
| 14 | 6 | "192 Sq. Ft. Bird House" | February 2, 2015 | 206 |
| 15 | 7 | "576 Sq. Ft. Mississippi Memory Home" | April 13, 2015 | 207 |
| 16 | 8 | "340 Sq. Ft. Solar Powered Studio" | April 20, 2015 | 208 |
| 17 | 9 | "340 Sq. Ft. Steampunk Adventure Home" | April 27, 2015 | 209 |
| 18 | 10 | "400 Sq. Ft. The Wine Tasting House" | May 4, 2015 | 210 |
| 19 | 11 | "480 Sq. Ft. The Gothic Castle House" | May 18, 2015 | 211 |
| 20 | 12 | "400 Sq. Ft. The Vacation House" | May 25, 2015 | 212 |
| 21 | 13 | "300 Sq. Ft. His n' Hers House" | July 13, 2015 | 214 |
| 22 | 14 | "180 Sq. Ft. Tiny Lighthouse" | July 22, 2015 | 216 |
| 23 | 15 | "180 Sq. Ft. Backpack House" | July 29, 2015 | 213 |
| 24 | 16 | "300 Sq. Ft. Crash Pad" | August 5, 2015 | 215 |
| 25 | 17 | "350 Sq. Ft. Outdoor Adventure House" | August 22, 2015 | 217 |
| 26 | 18 | "340 Sq. Ft. Pioneer House" | August 29, 2015 | 218 |

=== Season 3 (2016) ===
| No. overall | No. in season | Title | Original release date | Prod. code |
|---|---|---|---|---|
| 27 | 1 | "276 Sq. Ft. Basketball House" | March 26, 2016 | 301-90 |
| 28 | 2 | "315 Sq. Ft. Aviation House" | April 2, 2016 | 302 |
| 29 | 3 | "200 Sq. Ft. "Pop-Up Shop"" | April 9, 2016 | 303 |
| 30 | 4 | "200 Sq. Ft. Mobile Photo Studio" | April 16, 2016 | 310 |
| 31 | 5 | "300 Sq. Ft. Surf Shack Chic" | April 23, 2016 | 311 |
| 32 | 6 | "250 Sq. Ft. "World Traveler's Home"" | April 30, 2016 | 307 |
| 33 | 7 | "545 Sq. Ft. "Seven's Company"" | May 7, 2016 | 306 |
| 34 | 8 | "400 Sq. Ft. Ohana House" | May 14, 2016 | 315-90 |
| 35 | 9 | "600 Sq. Ft. Tiny Victorian" | May 21, 2016 | 317-90 |
| 36 | 10 | "220 Sq. Ft. Romantic Abode" | June 4, 2016 | 314-90 |
| 37 | 11 | "280 Sq. Ft. Survival House" | June 11, 2016 | 313-90 |
| 38 | 12 | "240 Sq. Ft. Country Meets City House" | June 18, 2016 | 316-90 |
| 39 | 13 | "204 Sq. Ft. Mountaineer Dream Home" | June 25, 2016 | 312-90 |
| 40 | 14 | "230 Sq. Ft. "Smart House"" | July 9, 2016 | 304 |
| 41 | 15 | "170 Sq. Ft. "Rustic Bike House"" | July 16, 2016 | 305 |
| 42 | 16 | "300 Sq. Ft. "Retro Garage House"" | July 23, 2016 | 308 |
| 43 | 17 | "300 Sq. Ft. Poker Night House" | July 30, 2016 | 309 |
| 44 | 18 | "200 Sq. Ft. Family-Friendly House" | August 13, 2016 | 322 |
| 45 | 19 | "240 Sq. Ft. Tiny Ski Lodge" | August 20, 2016 | 323 |
| 46 | 20 | "230 Sq. Ft. Travel Well House" | August 27, 2016 | 319 |
| 47 | 21 | "310 Sq. Ft. Penny's Tiny Playhouse" | October 8, 2016 | 321 |
| 48 | 22 | "325 Sq. Ft. Expandable Tiny Cottage" | October 15, 2016 | 325 |

=== Season 4 (2017) ===
| No. overall | No. in season | Title | Original release date | Prod. code |
|---|---|---|---|---|
| 49 | 1 | "398 Sq. Ft. Stargazers Tiny Dome" | January 7, 2017 | 53 |
| 50 | 2 | "330 Sq. Ft. Ever Growing Tiny House" | January 14, 2017 | 54 |
| 51 | 3 | "600 Sq. Ft. Power-Couple's Retreat" | January 21, 2017 | 56-90 |
| 52 | 4 | "325 Sq. Ft. Texan's Take Tiny House" | January 28, 2017 | 55 |
| 53 | 5 | "280 Sq. Ft. Bohemian Tree House" | February 4, 2017 | 52 |
| 54 | 6 | "380 Sq. Ft. Derby House" | February 11, 2017 | 46 |
| 55 | 7 | "460 Sq. Ft. Long Journey to Tiny" | February 18, 2017 | 50 |
| 56 | 8 | "700 Sq. Ft. Tiny Recording Studio" | February 25, 2017 | 44 |
| 57 | 9 | "400 Sq. Ft. Amplified Tiny House" | March 4, 2017 | 57 |
| 58 | 10 | "340 Sq. Ft. Big Dogs, Tiny House" | March 11, 2017 | 58 |
| 59 | 11 | "320 Sq. Ft. Tiny Arc" | March 18, 2017 | 61 |
| 60 | 12 | "370 Sq. Ft. Triathlete's Tiny Abode" | March 25, 2017 | N/A |
| 61 | 13 | "688 Sq. Ft. It Takes Six to Tiny" | May 6, 2017 | N/A |
| 62 | 14 | "750 Sq. Ft. Tiny Family Obstacle" | May 13, 2017 | N/A |
| 63 | 15 | "450 Sq. Ft. Tiny House on the Prairie" | May 20, 2017 | N/A |
| 64 | 16 | "330 Sq. Ft. Tick-Tock Tiny" | May 27, 2017 | N/A |
| 65 | 17 | "425 Sq. Ft. Tiny Tech House" | June 3, 2017 | 64 |
| 66 | 18 | "520 Sq. Ft. Tiny Maoil Hale" | June 10, 2017 | 67 |
| 67 | 19 | "320 Sq. Ft. Tiny Zen Den" | June 17, 2017 | 68 |
| 68 | 20 | "344 Sq. Ft. Tiny Tech-Free Retreat" | June 24, 2017 | 69 |
| 69 | 21 | "560 Sq. Ft. Taking Tiny Roots" | July 1, 2017 | 70 |
| 70 | 22 | "750 Sq. Ft. Tiny On-Deck!" | July 8, 2017 | 65 |

=== Season 5 (2019) ===
| No. overall | No. in season | Title | Original release date | Prod. code |
|---|---|---|---|---|
| 71 | 1 | "Tiny Forever After" | March 13, 2019 | TBA |
| 72 | 2 | "Going Tiny To Make Things Right" | March 20, 2019 | TBA |
| 73 | 3 | "Tiny House Builders Can't Jump" | March 27, 2019 | TBA |
| 74 | 4 | "No Fall Zone" | April 3, 2019 | TBA |
| 75 | 5 | "Empty Nest, Full House" | April 10, 2019 | TBA |
| 76 | 6 | "Two Turntables and a Tiny House" | April 17, 2019 | TBA |
| 77 | 7 | "Building Mini in Mississippi" | May 8, 2019 | TBA |
| 78 | 8 | "Going Tiny in Music City" | May 8, 2019 | TBA |
| 79 | 9 | "Tiny House Hits the Road" | August 24, 2019 | TBA |
| 80 | 10 | "A Firefighter Rebuilds" | August 31, 2019 | TBA |
| 81 | 11 | "A Texas-Sized Tiny" | September 7, 2019 | TBA |
| 82 | 12 | "Dad's Tiny Homecoming" | September 14, 2019 | TBA |
| 83 | 13 | "Tiny Digs for Racing Pigs" | September 21, 2019 | TBA |
| 84 | 14 | "Tiny Times Two" | September 28, 2019 | TBA |

== See also ==
- George Clarke's Amazing Spaces
- Tiny House Revival with Zach and John
