= Storage =

Storage may refer to:

== Goods ==
=== Containers ===
- Dry cask storage, for storing high-level radioactive waste
- Food storage
- Intermodal container, cargo shipping
- Storage tank

=== Facilities ===
- Mail storage, storage by mail or delivery service
- Self storage, a public storage facility
- Storage room or storeroom, a room for storing objects
  - Garage (residential), a storage space normally used to store cars
  - Overhead storage, for example overhead storage bins, racks, shelves, cabinets or track systems in aircraft, trains or buildings
- Warehouse, a commercial building for storage of goods

== Technology ==
- Cloud storage
- Computer data storage, a means to retain digital data
- Data storage, general recording and retention of information
- Energy storage
- Specific storage, of groundwater in an aquifer

== Arts and entertainment ==
- Storage (film), a 2009 Australian horror film
- The Storage, a 2011 Finnish film
- Storage (album), a 1988 album by Merzbow
- Storage Wars, a reality television show
- "Storage Wars", an episode of One Day at a Time (2017 TV series)

== People ==
- Ginnie Sebastian Storage, American clubwoman

== Other ==
- Storage (memory), a psychological and physiological process

== See also ==
- Container (disambiguation)
- Inventory (disambiguation)
- Store (disambiguation)
- Archive
