= Holded =

Spanish technology company

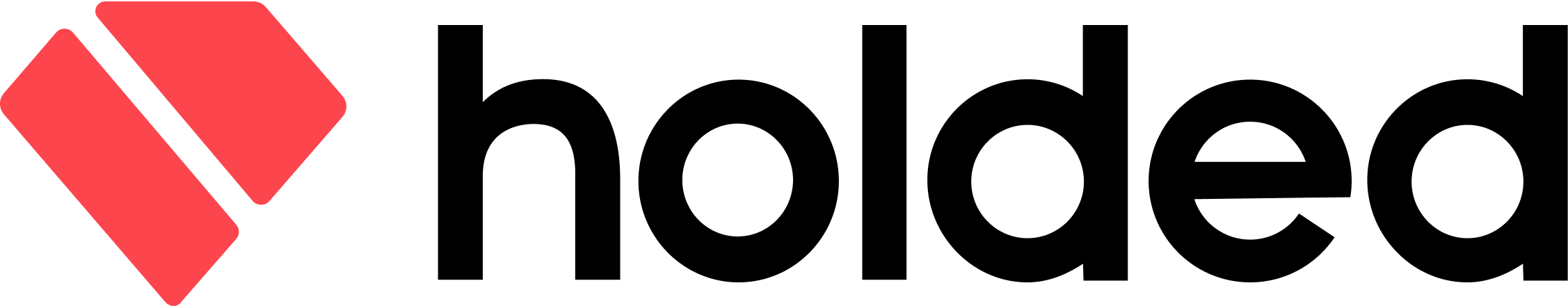
- Genre: Business software provider
- Founded: 2016; 10 years ago in Barcelona, Spain
- Founders: Javier Fondevila, Bernat Ripoll
- Fate: Acquired by Visma
- Headquarters: Barcelona, Spain
- Parent: Visma
- Website: www.holded.com

Holded is a Spanish technology company that develops cloud-based business management software for small and medium-sized enterprises (SMEs), self-employed professionals, and accounting firms. Its platform allows the centralization of operations such as invoicing, accounting, inventory, human resources, and project management in a single digital environment.

== History ==
Holded was founded in Barcelona in 2016 by Javier Fondevila and Bernat Ripoll. In mid-2016, Holded joined the SeedRocket accelerator program and obtained €239,000 in initial funding, officially launching in September 2016.

In January 2018, Holded raised €1.3 million in a funding round led by Nauta Capital and 4Founders Capital. In April 2019, Holded raised an additional €6 million in a Series A funding round led by Lakestar. In February 2021, a Series B funding round worth €15 million was carried out, led by Elaia. At that time, Holded had raised approximately €22 million in total funding.

In June 2021, Holded was acquired by the Norwegian software group Visma.

== Operations ==
Holded is headquartered in Barcelona and primarily provides services in Spain. In the early 2020s, it began expanding into other European countries.

== Platform ==
Holded's cloud-based platform offers a wide range of business management tools, including accounting, invoicing, inventory management, customer relationship management (CRM), project management, and human resources modules. The platform is offered under a software-as-a-service (SaaS) model.

Holded also includes features to automate accounting and analysis tasks. It integrates with third-party services and banking payment systems. The platform was developed to support multiple languages and currencies.
