= Self-storage box =

Self-storage boxes, also known as self-storage bins, are storage containers often rented by individuals and businesses in metropolitan areas. The storage box service offers on-demand pick-up and drop-off services to storage facilities; the self storage service does not.

== Description ==
Self-storage rental bins are primarily lockable boxes made from hard plastic suitable for household goods, clothing, shoes, electronics, documents and books. They typically have a capacity of at least 80 liters and a weight limit of approximately 45 kg (100 lb).

The storage bins are usually picked up from the tenants' location. Some operators offer a photographic inventory of bins and tracking system using the pictures as reference; apps to view, add or request storage returns. Self-storage becomes transparent with its virtual visual catalogue from which single items can be ordered back. Tenants are usually charged a fine for pickup and delivery, as well as a monthly fee for the storage at self-storage facilities. As prices for the small storage bins range between $5 and $10 per unit, they are increasingly becoming a popular storage option in both consumer and commercial applications. Bloomberg News cites the dramatic increase in demand over supply as being the primary reason for the bin storage option becoming so popular in cities like New York.

Unlike traditional self-storage facilities whereby tenants actually go to the store to view their items, the self-storage industry simplifies the storage process by providing clients with more transparency and on-demand services.

== Challenges to traditional self-storage industry ==
As major cities run short of living space, self-storage boxes are becoming a relevant service in many parts of the world. The service is attractive to clients because its pick-up services save time and effort, especially for the inhabitants of metropolitan areas such as Hong Kong, New York City, London, and Berlin.

Business analysts continue to monitor the space closely to follow the possible intrusion into the self-storage market. Key Banc identifies the major NYC startups as: RedBin, MakeSpace and Clutter. Although only RedBin keeps to the original bin storage model, the others have pivoted to offer full service moving and storage services.

== Design ==
Storage compartments can range in size from 1 m² to 100-200 m² or more. These can be either modular containers or individual storage bays. These "storage bays" are called boxes - they are enclosed areas of sheet metal with a door.

The main differences between a service and a self-storage warehouse are:

- the warehouseman provides all logistics, often at no extra cost to the customer;
- there is no possibility for clients to access the storage area;
- the warehouseman provides packaging material and packaging services.

While cloud storage services are more responsive than traditional warehousing to society's need to save time, they have a number of limitations that are unacceptable to some customers. In particular, the lack of access to belongings makes it difficult for those who need to use individual storage services on a regular basis, such as online shop owners who need access to an item after it has been sold. Traditional self-storage facilities are more suitable in such cases.

== See also ==
- Mailstorage
- On-demand outsourcing
