= The Inventors =

The Inventors may refer to:

- The Inventors (novel), a novel by Alexander Gordon Smith and Jamie Smith
- The Inventors (Australian TV program), a 1970–1982 Australian television program broadcast on ABC in which inventors competed
- The Inventors (Canadian TV program), a 1979 Canadian science biography television program that aired on CBC
- The New Inventors, a 2004–2011 Australian television program, similar in format to the 1970–1982 program

== See also ==
- Inventor (disambiguation)
