= Storage Wars: Texas =

- Genre: Reality
- Starring: Walt Cade; Ricky Smith; Clinton "Bubba" Smith; Victor Rjesnjansky (main Seasons 1-2; recurrent Season 3); Mary Padian (main Seasons 2-3); Jenny Grumbles (main Seasons 2-3); Jerry Simpson (main Season 1; occasionally Season 2); Lesa Lewis (main Season 1; occasionally Season 2); Moe Prigoff (Season 3); Roy Williams; Kenny Stowe; Matt Blevins; David Kay; Rudy Castro
- Narrated by: Thom Beers
- Theme music composer: Andy Kubiszewski
- Opening theme: "Money Owns This Town"
- Country of origin: United States
- Original language: English
- No. of seasons: 3
- No. of episodes: 78 (list of episodes)

Production
- Executive producers: Robert Sharenow, Elaine Frontain Bryant, Thom Beers, and Philip D. Segal
- Producer: Steve Robillard
- Running time: 21–22 minutes
- Production company: Original Productions

Original release
- Network: A&E
- Release: December 6, 2011 – January 7, 2014

Storage Wars: Texas (Originally Storage Wars Dallas) is a reality television series on the A&E Network that premiered in 2011. It was a regionalized spin-off of the highly-popular series Storage Wars.

As of the latter portion of Season 3, the show featured auctioneer Walt Cade, as well as auction hunters Victor Rjesnjansky, Ricky and Bubba Smith, Jenny Grumbles, and Mary Padian, with other buyers being included on some episodes, notably Lesa Lewis and her assistant Jerry Simpson (who were regulars on Season 1).

The premise was essentially the same as the parent show: when rent is not paid on a storage locker in Texas, the contents are sold by an auctioneer as a single lot of items. The show follows professional buyers who bid on the contents (usually for the purpose of reselling for profit should they purchase a locker) based only on a five-minute inspection and what they can see only from the door when it is opened. The episodes feature the winning buyers inspecting the contents (providing their estimate of their value), with one specific (and often unusual) item from each buyer featured being appraised to determine its worth. Between and during seasons, some buyers did not return to the show or appeared only occasionally in later seasons. One buyer, Mary Padian, became a regular bidder on the parent Storage Wars.

Sixteen episodes were filmed for the first season, debuting on A&E on Tuesday December 6, 2011. The premiere episode garnered 4.1 million viewers, making it the most watched series launch in the network's history. Viewers got a glimpse of Storage Wars: Texas on the first Storage Wars: Unlocked special, when Ricky and Bubba appeared to present a teaser clip. It was revealed that the show was to have been originally called Storage Wars: Dallas. It was later revealed that Storage Wars: Texas and its parent series Storage Wars had both been renewed for another twenty-six episode season respectively, with the second season of Texas premiering on August 15, 2012. Storage Wars: Texas can be seen internationally as well, as AETN International has sold the series to several channels in Canada, United Kingdom, Poland, Finland, and the Netherlands. The series ran for three seasons, and the final episode of the series aired on January 7, 2014.

As of 2022, the show also airs regularly on free streaming service Pluto TV.

== Participants ==
Name	Known As	Position	Seasons		
Name	Known As	Position	1	2	3
Walt Cade	The Colonel	Auctioneer	Main		
Ricky Smith and Bubba Smith	The Rangers	Professional Storage Unit Buyers	Main		
Jenny Grumbles	The Dazzler	Professional Storage Unit Buyer		Main	
Mary Padian	The Junkster	Professional Storage Unit Buyer		Main	
Victor Rjesnjansky (Note: Victor Rjesnjansky is a semi-regular cast member of season 3.)	The Outsider	Professional Storage Unit Buyer	Main		
Moe Prigoff ✝︎ (Note: Moe Prigoff is a semi-regular cast member of season 3.)	The Doc	Professional Storage Unit Buyer	Main		
Jerry Simpson and Lesa Lewis	The Boss	Professional Storage Unit Buyers	Main	Recurring	
Roy Williams	The Player	Professional Storage Unit Buyer	Recurring		
Kenny Stowe	—N/a	Professional Storage Unit Buyer			Recurring
Matt Blevins	—N/a	Professional Storage Unit Buyer			Recurring
David Kay	—N/a	Professional Storage Unit Buyer			Recurring
Rudy Castro	—N/a	Professional Storage Unit Buyer		Recurring	

=== Main buyers ===
- Jenny Grumbles - "The Dazzler" (Season 2-3): Jenny is a furniture restorer/designer, and she runs the Dallas-based "Uptown Country Homes" furniture boutique. She became interested in storage auctions after a friend brought in some furniture for $1,000 and sold it for $5,000. She joined the cast beginning with the premiere of the second season.
- Lesa Lewis ("The Boss") and her partner Jerry Simpson (Season 1; Recurring appearances season 2-3): Lesa and her employee/friend Jerry run the "Again and Again Resale" thrift store in Crockett, Texas. Lesa and Jerry are often at odds over Lesa's propensity to keep jewelry and antiques for herself rather than sell them at the store. In Season 2, Lesa and Jerry were seemingly replaced by Mary Padian and Jenny Grumbles, with their entry removed from the site. Rumors surfaced that A&E wanted to terminate the contract of Jerry Simpson because of a National Enquirer post which showed his arrests (1992 for selling a controlled substance; 2007 for assault). Due to this, both Lesa and Jerry initially decided not to return to the show. However, Lesa and Jerry eventually returned in a second-season episode that aired on November 7, 2012, and have since returned for several third-season episodes on a non-recurring basis.
- Mary Padian - "The Junkster" (Season 2-3): Mary is also a furniture restorer/designer, and she runs "Mary's Finds", a small custom furniture store. She was originally invited to the auctions by Moe Prigoff (see Former buyers section below) in the first season, and now sees the auctions as a source of raw materials to assist in bringing her store to "the next level". She joined the main cast beginning in the start of the second season. She tried to bid on lockers on her own in the first couple of episodes (being in over her head, by her own admission), so she decided to form a partnership with Moe, and later a brief partnership with Jenny in season 3. She returned to buying solo as she gained confidence. She has since moved to California and is part of the original "Storage Wars", making her the first star in the franchise to cross series, and she ended in the first episode of season 13.
- Morris "Moe" Prigoff - "The Doc" (Seasons 1-3): A septuagenarian practicing podiatrist who also owns an antique boutique called "River Regency Modern." Moe is known for his flamboyant wardrobe and purchases lockers looking for antiques and objets d'art to stock his gallery. He has accumulated his net worth through years in the world of storage auctions. In a second-season episode, it was revealed that he keeps items from his lockers not deemed to be valuable piled up in his back yard, upsetting his wife. Moe only appeared in three episodes of the third season. Moe died on March 4, 2021, aged 78.
- Victor Rjesnjansky - "The Outsider" (Seasons 1-3): A native of New York, he is known for his distinct Long Island accent (and "Right Here!" catchphrase when he bids), his BMW, and Sopranos-style wardrobe. He often ridicules his native-Texan competitors, whom he regards as yokels. He and his partner Joann run two stores in Tyler, Texas. (Approximately midway through Season 3, Victor stopped appearing on the show, and he is no longer featured in the opening sequence. However, he did reappear in the episode "Welcome to the World of Sonny Monday" with a new protege.)
- Ricky Smith and his nephew / friends Clinton "Bubba" Smith - "The Rangers" (Season 1-3): The pair operate a warehouse in Lampasas, Texas, where they stock their purchases for resale. Most of their business is wholesale but they also sell directly to the public. Ricky and Bubba often play up their "country bumpkin" personas in order to lull their competitors into a false sense of security at auction time.

=== Other buyers and participants ===
- "Cowboy" Matt Blevins - featured in several episodes beginning in Season 3. Favors short pants. Matt has shown a chauvinistic attitude toward the women on the show, and in "Hands Off My Embroidery" was almost evicted from an auction by Walt Cade for his conduct. In one episode he is uncautious in a locker & gets hit on the head with metal ladder, bleeding profusely.
- David Kay - a British buyer featured in three Season 3 episodes: "British Invasion", "Swinging With The Jenemy", and "Winners of The Centuries". Kay is known for his unusual vocabulary (to Americans) in describing the amount paid for a locker.
- Conor "Blom" Padian - Mary's brother. Blom has appeared in several episodes beginning in Season 3.
- "East Texas" Kenny Stowe - featured in several episodes beginning in Season 3. Kenny is also an auctioneer, operating Xtreme Auction Services in Athens, Texas. Kenny's philosophy is to buy multiple lockers at an auction (in "Float Like a Bubbafly" he buys several lockers, and per the A&E website is known to buy 30 lockers a month) and milk as much profit out of a locker as possible; since he operates his own auction house, he is willing and able to sell items (such as toys and old clothing) that other buyers would discard or donate to charity.
- Roy Williams - "The Player" (Season 1): Roy was formerly a defensive back in the NFL, having been a 2002 1st round draft pick of the Dallas Cowboys. Roy played there for 7 years and ended his 9-year career spending 2 years with the Cincinnati Bengals. Roy made his first appearance in episode 10 of Season 1 ("If I Were a Tibettin' Man"), although not as a storage buyer (Ricky and Bubba found some Oklahoma Sooners mini-helmets that were purportedly autographed by Roy, a former Sooner, and asked him to verify his autograph). They then invited Roy to come to a storage auction to see what it was like. When he did, Roy was hooked, and then cast in episode 11 ("Dallas Cowboys And Indians"). He did not return for the second season.

=== Other cast members ===
- Walt Cade - "The Colonel": The show's auctioneer. He is known to wear a different, custom-made shirt at each auction. His catchphrases are "hammer up!" (at the start of each auction) and "until next time, hammer down!" (at the end of each auction).
- Thom Beers - The executive producer/narrator of the show who gives a quick explanation of the show's premise at the beginning, and a recap of the buyers profits/losses at the end.

== Show opening ==
Every show opens with announcer Thom Beers setting the scene for the series: "When storage units are abandoned, in the great state of Texas, the treasures within are put up for auction."

The opening titles features a sequence of cast members, which has continually changed during the show's run (the only consistency is that Ricky and Bubba are shown first, while Walt is shown last):

- The original (Season 1) sequence featured (in order) Ricky and Bubba, Jerry and Lesa, Moe, Victor, and Walt.
- In Season 2, Jerry and Lesa were removed from the sequence, while Jenny and Mary were added.
- In Season 3, a completely new sequence was filmed, featuring (in order) Ricky and Bubba, Victor, Jenny, Moe and Mary, and Walt. However, the sequence was revised later in Season 3 to remove Moe and Victor; as of November 2013 the sequence features (in order) Ricky and Bubba, Jenny, Mary, and Walt.

The theme song "Money Owns This Town" (which was written and recorded specifically for the original Storage Wars) plays over the opening titles (in a slightly remixed, Western style form).

== Episodes ==
Season	Episodes	Originally released	
Season	Episodes	First released	Last released
1	16	December 6, 2011	April 3, 2012
2	34	August 15, 2012	February 26, 2013
3	28	August 27, 2013	January 7, 2014

== Notes ==
The series was re-broadcast on E4 Extra from 21 August 2026 onwards.
