= List of Storage Wars: Texas episodes =

This is a list of episodes from the reality television series Storage Wars: Texas, which airs on the cable network A&E. The episodes listed here are in a broadcast order, not production order, based on the episode guide on AETV.com.

The descriptions of the items listed in this article reflect those given by their sellers and others in the episodes prior to their appraisal by experts as authentic or inauthentic, unless otherwise noted. Episodes of this show started premiering on December 6, 2011.

== Series overview ==
Season	Episodes	Originally released	
Season	Episodes	First released	Last released
1	16	December 6, 2011	April 3, 2012
2	34	August 15, 2012	February 26, 2013
3	28	August 27, 2013	January 7, 2014

== Episodes ==
=== Season 1 (2011–2012) ===
No. overall	No. in season	Title	Location	Original release date
1	1	"Texas Sold 'Em"	Dallas	December 6, 2011
The Storage Wars spread to the lone star state in the city of Dallas. Buyers Ricky and Bubba Smith look past the grime to find a vintage air compressor in their $425 locker. Antique aficionado Dr. Moe Prigoff purchases a unit for $525 and sniffs out some stunning lithographs. Slick New Yorker Victor Rjesnjansky spends $250 on a room which has a disturbing past. And new store owner Lesa Lewis bids to keep her doors open and her assistant Jerry's mouth closed. The buyers have to be at the top of their game. Like oil, these lockers look crude, but to the trained eye, they're as good as gold.
2	2	"Bounty Hunter Bubba Fett"	Irving	December 13, 2011
The auction action heads to Irving, a town located directly between Dallas and Fort Worth. Lesa Lewis and Moe Prigoff go toe-to-toe for a unit with a mystical item. Victor Rjesnjansky makes twenty-five times his initial investment on a low-price unit, which he pays $20 for. And Ricky and Bubba win a $925 unit containing sci-fi memorabilia. How much profit can one man make? From crystal balls to Jedi masters − the buyers will have to trust in the force to be named the Irving winner.
3	3	"Snake Rattle and Roll"	Arlington	December 20, 2011
From stadiums to amusement parks, Arlington has the Texas buyers on the lookout for memorabilia and collectables. Ricky and Bubba play up their country roots in an attempt to nuke the competition. Lesa Lewis treads on a snakeskin ensemble. And Victor Rjesnjansky goes after a scooter with a three thousand dollar potential. Though the buyers search for storage gold-in this arena, it's a silver item that takes first place.
4	4	"Mo' Money, Moe Prigoff"	Longview	December 27, 2011
As the bidders arrive at Walt's Longview auction, they notice one major problem. There's a 100-buyer swarm-all of whom are geared up to spend. Ricky and Lesa duke it out for a power tool bonanza. Victor Rjesnjansky strikes it big with a mid-century unit, while Moe Prigoff uses an old friend to transform his locker of junk into a unit of "fabulous" furnishings. With droves of bidders on the prowl--one buyer will have his clocked cleaned, while another cleans up with some antique clocks!
5	5	"The Good, the Bad, and the Hungry"	River Oaks and Deep Ellum	December 27, 2011
The bidders head up to the town of River Oaks. When a recently deceased tycoon's unit goes up for sale, the buyers ready themselves for all-out war. Bubba and Ricky find some antique kitchen gear. Moe Prigoff unearths some "mad" finds. While Victor Rjesnjansky and Lesa Lewis fight tooth-and-nail to become the new tycoons of storage. From an eight grand payout to a fistful of burgers, the buyers will have to come, guns ablazin' if they want to win this auction.
6	6	"Remember the Alamo?"	Fort Worth	January 10, 2012
The storage warriors journey back to Fort Worth to a facility known for its deceptively bad looking lockers. Lesa Lewis tries to find value in an old cookie jar. Victor Rjesnjansky becomes a New York Yankee in King Arthur's court, and Moe Prigoff hopes for a high score after missing Walt's auction. Ricky and Bubba don't take a risk, which gets them no unit. Looks can be deceiving, as the worst-looking locker delivers the biggest payout.
7	7	"Home on the Strange"	Burleson	March 6, 2012
When the buyers head to the conservative town of Burleson, they find items that are anything but ordinary! Moe Prigoff is on the hunt for oddities. Lesa and Victor battle for a store display worth $8000. While Ricky and Bubba find what they believe is an electric hemorrhoid donut. Faster than lightning, more powerful than a steaming locomotive when the buyers head to this Texas Bible belt, the competition gets weird.
8	8	"The Surgeon, the Witch, and the Wardrobe"	Longview and Dallas	March 6, 2012
A tornado is coming! When the buyers head to East Texas, the race is on to grab a locker before the storm hits. Ricky and Bubba go after a table with an ancient purpose. Victor tries to talk Moe out of a disastrous investment. While Jerry and Lesa stumble across some radioactive materials. In the wake of the storm, two buyers will have to band together to turn a profit. Who will nab a locker and who will be running for shelter?
9	9	"Puffy in the Sky with Diamonds"	Irving	March 13, 2012
In the city of Irving, the buyers are on the hunt for old heirlooms. Victor employs some underhanded tactics to rattle the competition. Jerry and Lesa find some valuable roping gear. Ricky and Bubba try to get the inside scoop from their connections. And one team scores a locker with a potential 50 grand hit. The big question at this auction: Who will find the diamond (or diamonds) in the rough?
10	10	"If I Were a Tibettin' Man"	Fort Worth	March 13, 2012
The buyers venture to a Fort Worth facility with the potential for low costs and huge finds. Ricky and Bubba find football autographs, which may or may not prove authentic. Lesa Lewis buys a unit to prove she's no bottom feeder. And Victor Rjesnjansky goes head to head with hell on wheels. When a locker filled with high-end furniture goes up for sale, the race is on for a potential US$100,000 score.
11	11	"Dallas Cowboys and Indians"	Fort Worth	March 20, 2012
The buyers head to Fort Worth in search of western collectibles and old heirlooms. Ricky and Bubba bring a legendary cowboy for some celebrity help. Victor Rjesnjansky tries to make peace with the locals. And Lesa Lewis finds the ultimate weapon to squash her New York adversary. Though a civil war relic is found, the real question remains: how much is it Fort Worth?
12	12	"Who Bought JFK?"	Lake Highlands	March 20, 2012
The buyers head to a high-end facility in Lake Highlands, a neighborhood in the northeast section of Dallas. Lesa Lewis battles for a locker with a dark item, Victor Rjesnjansky hunts for the key to a padlocked treasure chest, and one buyer stumbles across a real piece of American history. With conspiracies and collaborations afoot, the question on everyone's mind. Who bought JFK?
13	13	"High Tea Tighty"	Lewisville	March 27, 2012
Lewisville is known for its glittering lakes and well-to-do residence meaning it's the perfect place for the buyers to strike it rich. Victor and Lesa duke it out for a locker with a player piano. Roy Williams finds an alarming item, while Ricky and Bubba learn a thing or two about tea parties. The treasure is everywhere, but who will take home the winning item is anybody's guess.
14	14	"For a Few Lockers More"	Dallas–Fort Worth metroplex	March 27, 2012
The Storage Stampede hits the Dallas metroplex with back-to-back auctions. If the buyers can't keep up with the crowd, they risk missing a locker of a lifetime. Ricky and Bubba enlist a fisherman's strategy. Victor Rjesnjansky gambles on some video poker machines. Jerry forces Lesa to buy a contractors unit, while Moe Prigoff gets caught up in some monkey business. Through a bevy of auctions, the buyers will have to show grit, stamina, and the ability to read a map, if they hope to win.
15	15	"Fandom of the Opera"	Tyler and Lewisville	April 3, 2012
In the refined East Texas country town of Tyler, the hunt begins for rare art and designer furniture. A tantrum from Lesa Lewis forces Jerry to carry the weight of the team. Bubba Smith's buys a locker for $450 and has claustrophobia jeopardizes the Rangers' chance of scoring. And Roy Williams unearths a six flag brochure from the 1970s. With Victor Rjesnjansky at a home court advantage, the rest of the storage warriors will have to put their personal strife aside to keep the Outsider from sweeping.
16	16	"A Fistful of Auctions"	Dallas and Lewisville	April 3, 2012
The buyers have a big decision to make: go to an auction with safe "bread and butter" and "all reliable" lockers in Dallas or risk it all by gambling at an auction in a developing neighborhood of Lewisville. Lesa Lewis gets a power bill for her store, so she buys a unit for $350 and hoping to make a profit. Ricky and Bubba buy a unit packed with household items for $350 and also find a collection of antique gunslingers toys in it. Victor Rjesnjansky tries to wash over the competition with his $900 unit, while Roy Williams purchases a unit for $850 and calculates a new strategy. With one big decision to make, who will go for broke and who will go home broke?

=== Season 2 (2012–2013) ===
No. overall	No. in season	Title	Location	Original release date
17	1	"Flight of the GrumbleBee"	Mineral Wells	August 15, 2012
The buyers journey to the resort and spa town of Mineral Wells. "Rangers" Ricky and Bubba face off with Victor for a luxury household locker, which team will end up owning it? New buyer Jenny Grumbles tries to exterminate two pests: a swarm of termites and an uncomfortable buyer. "The Outsider" takes some old wood to an old friend. And a classic lighter sparks up a fortune. With a massive payout at stake, the buyers will have to learn that big things often come in small packages. Meanwhile, Moe and Mary didn't show up to the auction.
18	2	"Mary Had a Little Blom"	Irving	August 15, 2012
The buyers travel to the transportation hub of Irving. Dr. Moe's new buyer protegee Mary Padian returns, giving refurbisher Jenny Grumbles a run for her money. Ricky Smith learns a valuable lesson in human anatomy. Victor Rjesnjansky buys a secret agent's locker. And Bubba Smith is forced to find a buyer for some explicit art. Dr. Moe once said, "Mary's imagination really blows my socks off!" As the buyers are about to discover her mind is far stranger than expected.
19	3	"Hate to Burst Your Bubba"	Lake Highlands	August 22, 2012
Auctions take place in Lake Highlands, a neighborhood in the northeastern section of Dallas. Victor Rjesnjansky goes with his strategy and snakes his way into Bubba's mind turning him against Ricky. Jenny Grumbles scours the lockers, while working for a very picky client. Mary Padian bids against her former mentor. And Dr. Moe Prigoff returns to the auction finding an item that blows up in his face in his $825 unit that Mary wanted badly. From repurposed to refurbished the buyers will have to hustle to pump up their profits.
20	4	"Vic in the Head"	Tyler	August 22, 2012
The buyers head to Tyler, a country town with a thriving art scene. Ricky tries to remove the "Vic fungus" that s invaded Bubba's head. Jenny Grumbles spends $300 on a unit and finds a rare insect display. Victor Rjesnjansky brawls for a unit with an antique train set. And Moe Prigoff reveals a dark secret in hopes of getting Mary's help. While one team enlists Grand Slam Champion Anne Smith to make heads of their tennis heads, another goes to an old friend to make sure their sculptural bust is not a bust.
21	5	"No Stash, Moe's Stache"	Carrollton	August 29, 2012
Carrollton hosts the auction. Moe and Mary debate their team name. Victor Rjesnjansky tries to blend in with some camouflage hunting gear. Jenny Grumbles wages war with Mary Padian for a unit with some glass blowing items. And Ricky and Bubba visit in old friend for a lesson in drugs. With the buyers acting crazy, who will be able to turn their storage stash into cold, hard cash?
22	6	"Out of Af-Ricky"	Cedar Hill	August 29, 2012
The buyers venture to Cedar Hill, home of the rich and fabulous Dr. Moe Prigoff. Jenny Grumbles tries to toast Victor for a locker filled with tchotchkes. Bubba journeys alone to the heart of storage darkness. Mary tries to keep Moe from losing his mind and buying a locker filled with BBQ sauce. And Victor brings his truck to sweep the competition. From civil war prosthetic to voodoo statues one buyer will curse his locker and one locker will curse its buyer.
23	7	"Bubbapocalypse Now"	Arlington	September 5, 2012
In Arlington, tensions reach critical mass. Fed up with Victor's head games, Bubba vows to run the price up on his "Outsider" nemesis. Jenny Grumbles finds an item with some stimulating properties. Mary and Moe try their hand at having a strategy for once. And Ricky Smith finds a collectable coin that may save the world from the Mayan Apocalypse. With collectable dolls and ancient artifacts at stake, who will feel enraptured and who be swallowed up in the rapture?
24	8	"Night of the Pondering Dead"	Ponder and Arlington	September 12, 2012
In the small town of Ponder, a dark secret looms; the townspeople pounce on lockers like hordes of zombies. Ricky and Bubba spend $2,900 on two units – one with some intimate objects for cattle and the other containing much hunting gear. Jenny Grumbles scrambles for antique furniture. Victor buys an $800 unit and hears the voice of doom when appraising motorcycle gear, while Moe and Mary uncover an object that may have been built by Benjamin Franklin with their $600 unit. As the buyers quickly learn in the town of Ponder, the rabid citizens are quite fond of brains.
25	9	"Jenny Bears All"	Mesquite	September 19, 2012
The buyers ride out to the cowboy town of Mesquite. Mary Padian tries to impress Dr. Moe with buying a unit for $1,050 containing a sleak, refurbished pool table. Jenny Grumbles uncovers a hot and steely garden item in her unit. Ricky and Bubba duke it out for a unit with some antique equestrian gear, while Victor Rjesnjansky attempts to snatch up his piece of the pie. But when Jenny suffers a blow to the head, her dreams of storage glory go up in smoke.
26	10	"Aust-in-Translation"	Austin	October 10, 2012
Walt Cade and his buyers hit the road to Austin, the capital of the state and home to a multitude of proudly eclectic weirdos. Moe and Mary battle for an antique unit with an 8 grand payout. Jenny gets a lesson in rock and roll. Victor finds an energizing item. And Rangers Ricky and Bubba use their home turf advantage to kick out the tourist competition. In a city whose motto is "Keep Austin Weird" one team will truly learn the definition of an oddity.
27	11	"Piñatas and Ta-tas"	Austin	October 17, 2012
The buyers once again return in Austin and having a successful day. Jenny Grumbles aims for furniture and buys a $600 unit, but gets a new set of wheels. Ricky and Bubba get mean to get a locker, which is successful by scoring them a $2,225 unit and hoping for good profit. The team of Moe and Mary joins Victor in the piñata-selling business by both teams purchasing units with piñatas, leading to a turf war on Sixth Street where only one piñata seller will be left standing.
28	12	"Rhymes with Witch"	Lake Highlands	October 24, 2012
On the hottest day of summer, the buyers return to the wealthy Dallas neighborhood of Lake Highlands. Victor Rjesnjansky spends $250 on a unit gets burned by a mistake, but is shocked because he doubles his investment. Bubba finds a book that might magically transport him to another realm. Moe Prigoff, Mary Padian, and Jenny Grumbles lock horns with a pair from Storage Wars Texas past and buys nothing. Meanwhile, Jerry and Lesa are back and buy $875 on a sword memorabilia.
29	13	"A Jenny for Your Thoughts"	Fort Worth	November 7, 2012
Looking for a competitive edge in the male-dominated storage auction scene in Fort Worth; the Dazzler uses her feminine wiles to obtain inside information. Ricky and Bubba set their Texas land speed record. Mary gets a second opinion on a find that Moe considers worthless. Venturing where no women are allowed, Jenny uncovers clues to the secrets of a centuries-old secret society. Victor and the other men mock her methods, but Jenny demonstrates that force is often no match for flirtation and that a smile can open all kinds of doors.
30	14	"I'd Do Anything for Lesa (But I Won't Do That)"	DeSoto	November 7, 2012
Sparks fly in DeSoto as Jerry Simpson and Lesa Lewis return from East Texas to make another score and this time, Jenny Grumbles and Mary Padian are ready. Victor's emergency find has him rush to the local fire department. Jenny does an incredible makeover on some old furniture. Mary and Moe go spelunking to appraise some unusual items. To the amusement of the other buyers, the tension between Lesa, Jenny, and Mary boils over, and Lesa finds that what she says can and will be used against her. Ricky and Bubba go home with a bad attitude, and goes home empty handed.
31	15	"Mary Defeats Auction"	Garland	December 2, 2012
Garland, a city boasting the slogan "Texas Made Here", hosts the auction. Moe and Mary find a rare piece of U.S. history. Jenny Grumbles, influenced by a popular book series, discovers items that may stretch her sensibilities. Ricky and Bubba leave their comfort zone to turn a Texas river into a trading post. While one buyer brings more cash than ever before, everyone is quick to learn that there's a lot to be made in Garland.
32	16	"Tank Girl"	Addison	December 2, 2012
The buyers venture to the Dallas suburb of Addison. The Rangers make an antique find that Ricky believes has its origin on the high seas. Jenny uncovers a piece of Hollywood. Mary, going solo, inventively attempts to channel The Doc as she makes a fateful purchase. The action doesn't stop when the bidding ends, and after two buyers haggle over an item, the buyers find that one person's trash is another person's death trap.
33	17	"Mary's New Hoopty Ride"	Oak Cliff	December 11, 2012
The auctions take place in Oak Cliff. Jenny battles Mary for a locker containing antique electronics. Vic finds that it's all about the Washingtons. Ricky and Bubba discover a Vaudeville curio with a hidden surprise. Moe and Mary pursue a locker for $125 containing what could be Mary's new truck, but then discovers many of its parts are missing. While one team's dream is crushed, another learns that a belief in magic can allow them to take flight.
34	18	"Breaking Bubba"	Arlington	December 19, 2012
The bidders arrive at the auction in Arlington. Ricky and Bubba going in a bidding war on a unit, and Ricky and Bubba end up buying it for $450 and find some remote-control race cars and go to the races. Victor has his eyes a unit with nefarious undertones. Moe operates a wheelchair that Mary at less than full strength and goes home without a unit.
35	19	"Buyers on the Storm"	Mineral Wells and DeSoto	January 1, 2013
The bargain hunters roll into the city of Mineral Wells, everyone encounters a round of severe weather at the auction. Victor buys a mystery unit containing boxes for $225 and is hoping to stay above water. Jenny Grumble's $400 locker brings her joy, and profit. Moe and Mary purchase a unit for $300, and their find brings them to visit a cattle farm. Ricky and Bubba score a unit containing football items at a different facility for $1,050 and hoping for a big turnover.
36	20	"What Do Women Want?"	Mesquite	January 1, 2013
The buyers once again head up to Mesquite. Ricky and Bubba have some terrible luck and are not happy with it and buys nothing. Jenny gets bid up by Ricky on a unit she gets for $1,850 (which is the most expensive unit that she's bought before) with much good furniture, antiques, and a rare jazz album. Moe and Mary spend $275 on a unit and later find a squatter in their locker. Victor is looking for women's merchandise, and buys a unit for $850 with men's merchandise and doesn't care about finding women's merchandise after he buys it.
37	21	"Rules to Buy By"	Waxahachie	January 8, 2013
The buyers are hoping to get some great units in the city of Waxahachie. Ricky and Bubba find a strange weapon in their $1,750 unit. Moe and Mary buy a unit for $900 and find an unusual-looking wooden chair, and then meet a qualified wood expert for an appraisal. Jenny spends $500 on a unit containing a fancy cabinet but finding out it's worth nothing. Victor is on the hunt for antiques, but ends up not finding anything good.
38	22	"Bubba and the Chocolate Factory"	Las Colinas	January 8, 2013
The buyers travel to the upscale Las Colinas area of Irving, and are in the mood for buying. Moe and Mary purchase a $375 unit and finds an old bomb that could be profitable. Jenny spends $475 on a unit and explores the world of high-priced sports cars with her locker. Ricky and Bubba spend $210 on a unit with some good merchandise and get profitable, and then find a chocolate device and it turns out to be more good news. Victor loses his game, and goes home empty handed.
39	23	"The Cock Fighter from Mexico"	DeSoto	January 15, 2013
The bidders travel to DeSoto. Victor attempts to sweep the competition by purchasing all the units up for sale, he gets 4 different units for $1,610 and finds an antique manikin and ends up making a good profit from all his units. Jenny and Victor split the cost of a $1,600 (so Victor and Jenny both pay $800) with Victor taking the car parts and Jenny taking the furniture and a few boxes, Jenny steals a potential half a million dollars away from Victor when she finds Beanie Babies in the room. A mystery bidder named Rudy Castro sets his sights on a locker that he buys for $175 and finds Willie Nelson memorabilia and makes some profit. Ricky and Bubba go home with nothing. Meanwhile, Moe and Mary both are nowhere to be seen.
40	24	"You Bought It, You Break It"	Mesquite	January 15, 2013
The buyers return to Mesquite, and some bidders are hoping their luck will change so they can obtain a locker or make profit. Victor is on the search for small items since his store is packed, will he go with something or nothing? Moe and Mary buy two units for a total cost of $1,400; their finds have them jumping and dancing. Jenny battles a work-related injury and ends up buying no units. Ricky and Bubba buy a unit for $275 with some furniture and boxes and find what they think is an antique room divider, and get $1,000 profit, but their profits soon sink as they break it.
41	25	"A Ricky Runs Through It"	Waxahachie	January 29, 2013
Victor hopes a return to the town of Waxahachie will be worth it to stop his losing streak. Moe and Mary spend $1,450 on two lockers - one with an antique instrument, which Moe thinks it will yield big profit. "The Rangers" buy a unit for $525 with some industrial equipment and many tables, and also end up finding some valuable fishing poles and make about five times their money back. Jenny tries to turn on the charm, but will it work?
42	26	"Bronze Beauty"	Pantego	January 29, 2013
The bargain hunters travel to the small town of Pantego. Victor gets back in the game and spends $550 and uncovers a box of antique periodicals in his unit. Moe and Mary buy a unit for $450 and end up obtaining a useful beauty salon item, and hoping to break even with their purchase. Ricky and Bubba steal a $350 unit right from under Jenny filled with furniture and find a fancy box (which is locked), which the items in it are worth $4,000, much to Jenny's dismay. Jenny falls for "The Rangers" tricks and goes home with nothing once again. With all the bidders going in full force, who will be the winners and who will be the people going home empty handed?
43	27	"Mayor of Moneytown"	Carrollton and Pantego	February 5, 2013
The bidders travel to an auction in Carrollton. Victor buys two units for the total price of $1,700 with one unit containing custom motorcycle parts and the other filled with the remains of an office or business with industrial equipment and reals in a huge profit. Jenny Grumbles gambles on a unit and spends $600 with some suitcases and other items and finds some vintage cameras, and is hoping to break even with her purchase. Ricky and Bubba purchase a unit for $325, and Ricky ends up faces one of his biggest fears. Mary and Moe bid hope to find a potential showpiece inside the units, but find nothing special.
44	28	"Darth Victor"	Arlington	February 5, 2013
The bidding battles erupt between all the buyers and the newbies in the city of Arlington. Moe and Mary spend $950 on a unit and discover a sweet music device. Victor goes under cover and wins a $700 unit and winds up with a 1970s lamp. Jenny tries to go for her dream locker, but Ricky and Bubba steal it from her for $2,100, which contains much furniture and many common household items.
45	29	"Fast Times at Texas High"	Killeen and Cedar Hill	February 12, 2013
The buyers go to Killeen, which is where Bubba attended high school. The high school memories stir up between all the buyers, including Bubba. Victor wakes up early spends $475 on a unit with Civil War collectibles, but could they all be a reproduction? Jenny finds a safe in her $1,200 unit and attempts to crack it open. Moe and Mary buy a unit for $950 and want to build a garden sculpture.
46	30	"Shake Your Tailfeather!"	Fort Worth	February 12, 2013
Jenny steps up her game in Fort Worth by driving the prices up and buying a unit for $600 that has profit. Victor buys a unit for $850 with furniture and many shoe boxes, and makes much money off the shoes alone. Moe and Mary gamble on a $300 with some vintage toys and talent performance. Ricky and Bubba go home without a unit.
47	31	"Throw Momma From the Auction"	Lancaster	February 19, 2013
The bidders arrive in the bargain desert of Lancaster, and everyone is hoping to go home with units that have profit. Ricky and Bubba have bad luck with their $550 unit, but turn it around with their warehouse sale and make a little over $10,000. Moe makes a risky purchase on a unit for $250 after returning from his Hawaiian vacation and bag a small profit. What him Mary want, Jenny's mother Shellee joins in the auction, they purchase a unit for $300 with things and have a find that leaves them hanging. Victor doesn't see profit in any of the units.
48	32	"The Ninja and the Pit Master"	DeSoto	February 19, 2013
The group heads to the city of DeSoto, where only four lockers are up for grabs. A new bidder named J.D., who drives to the auction on a motorcycle, drives up the prices. Ricky and Bubba hope to sweep the competition by purchasing every locker for sale. Moe and Mary buy a unit for $1,600 containing furniture, and hope to find something cool. The other bidders make it hard for Jenny to purchase a locker. Who will have good lockers and who will be left behind in the dust? Meanwhile, Victor is nowhere to be seen.
49	33	"Hoarder Patrol"	Hallsville	February 26, 2013
The buyers go to the town of Hallsville and see that there is a massive crowd at the auction. Ricky and Bubba compete with the crowds walk away with a $900 unit containing many valuable instruments and other items that earn them profit. Victor meets a local beauty queen after finding an item in his unit. Jenny explores a house of worship after finding an item in her $350 locker. Moe and Mary get caught by Moe's wife, but make a nice profit on a hidden treasure.
50	34	"Hoopty Dreams"	Fort Worth	February 26, 2013
Teamwork falls short when the buyers return to Fort Worth. Moe and Mary prepare and stock up for a sale, and hope to hit big with their $650 unit. Jenny's antique that she finds in her $400 unit requires scientific examination. Ricky and Bubba spends $650 on a science protector. Victor seeks an ally, but not much else.

=== Season 3 (2013–2014) ===
No. overall	No. in season	Title	Location	Original release date
51	1	"Raiders of the Lost Arkana"	Texarkana	August 27, 2013
The regulars encounter eager local bidders in the border city of Texarkana. Victor wins a unit with action figures for $600 and hopes to score big. Jenny buys a unit for $850 and ends up looks for diamonds in the rough. Ricky and Bubba purchase a unit for $1,300 that's full of stuff and later find an unforgettable antique. Moe and Mary buy a locker with a myriad of items in it for $800 and hope to turn a profit.
52	2	"Take a Deep Breath, It's Lesa!"	Conroe	August 27, 2013
An old adversary pops up in the Houston suburb of Conroe. Moe and Mary feel the pressure. Ricky and Bubba purchase a locker for $450 and try to profit from paranoia. Lesa Lewis is back and buys a unit for $2,400 with much furniture and trash bags and ends up finding an oxygen bar. Jenny drives a long way to get here and heads home without a unit.
53	3	"British Invasion"	DeSoto	September 3, 2013
The buyers seek antiques in the city of DeSoto. A new face from across the pond challenges Ricky and Bubba; David learns how sausage is made; Jenny gives Mary a lift.
54	4	"Swinging With the Jenemy"	Dallas	September 3, 2013
The buyers return to Dallas again. Jenny seeks industrial material for a custom job, and buys a $300 locker containing few items and hopes to create something cool. Mary ignores the law to land a dream locker, then ignores about not getting a locker. Ricky and Bubba spend $3,500 on a locker with many tools and various other items and discover cash in the wind.
55	5	"Ka-Chingaladas!"	Garland	September 10, 2013
Ricky and Bubba take on a flea-market king in the city of Garland. All the buyers hope to conquer and get great units. Jenny and Mary discover an armory. Victor returns with a new protege.
56	6	"It's Always Sonny in Texas"	Fort Worth	September 10, 2013
A local auctioneer stirs up things when the buyers return to Fort Worth. The local auctioneer, Matt Belvins, purchases a locker for $200 containing much furniture and boxes and does better than expected. Jenny and Mary disagree on the value of their purchases. Victor buys a locker for $700 that everyone thinks is full of trash but he thinks it isn't, and his protege stands to lose the most. Ricky and Bubba do not buy at the auction.
57	7	"Stowe-Age Wars"	Mesquite	September 17, 2013
Ricky and Bubba's nemesis resurfaces in the city of Mesquite. Jenny and Mary uncover a Cold War relic. A struggling Victor searches for bargains.
58	8	"Built for Pleasure Not Speed"	Longview	October 1, 2013
The buyers head straight back to Longview for bargains. Jerry and Lesa purchase a unit for $2,150 and locates a violin. Rudy Castro is back and he paid $300 on a locker with a compound bow worth $1,050. Jenny and Mary try to reason with Jerry and Lesa to buy off a few things from their locker but they go home empty-handed.
59	9	"Winners of the Centuries"	Fort Worth	October 22, 2013
The buyers outcome in Fort Worth. David Kay spend $900 on a locker for the four wheel. Victor buys a locker for $450 that is clean and locates some spy gear. Ricky and Bubba go home empty handed. Mary brings along her brother nicknamed "Blom" and they purchase a locker for $400 with many boxes and find some fire objects buried in the unit.
60	10	"Take That Beethoven!"	Dallas	October 22, 2013
The bidders come to Dallas. Jerry and Lesa spend $250 on a horse blanket and a boot. Ricky and Bubba discover lamp tools. Mary and Jenny purchase a locker for $1,425 that everyone wanted and alter Mary breaks a piano in the unit which Jenny isn't happy about, but they break even (though this would end their partnership). Matt Blevins went home empty handed but had a great time with the girls.
61	11	"Yo! Mary Raps"	Carrollton	October 29, 2013
The buyers head to the suburbs of Dallas in Carrollton for the auction. Things heat up between Mary and Jenny after Mary steals a $725 locker and locates a karaoke machine then later performs on stage. Kenny Stowe finds an unusual cycle in his unit. Ricky and Bubba buy a locker for $425 that they hopes brings them profit. Jenny saves her money for the next auction.
62	12	"Hands Off the Embroidery"	Fort Worth	October 29, 2013
The heat gets turned up at an auction in Fort Worth, where a buyer gets burned. Jenny wins a $900 unit and later meets up with a movie war. Matt Blevins getting the elbow through the lockers and goes home empty handed (and with a warning from Walt). Mary does good stuff to her cheap $200 locker. Ricky and Bubba buy a nice household and furniture unit for $300 do great.
63	13	"Cardboard Couture"	Tyler	November 5, 2013
The regulars, plus Kenny Stowe, make the drive to Tyler. Mary overpays for a $350 locker; in an attempt to recover her investment she tries to fashion a dress out of several old cardboard boxes from her locker, with no success. Kenny Stowe buys two lockers for $500 and "milks" all the profit out of them. Ricky and Bubba don't purchase any lockers at the auction, but do manage to win a coin toss and receive $100 from Kenny. Jenny spends $1,175 some microphone she did tried so hard.
64	14	"Spurs Of The Moment"	Ponder	November 5, 2013
The auction returns to the small Texas town of Ponder, where Rangers Ricky and Bubba look to extend a lucky streak. Ricky and Bubba buy a $675 locker with many tubs and boxes and double their money. Jenny discovers her inner ballerina while Mary takes a cue from her ex-partner and works the crowd. Cowboy Matt Blevins returns, and buys a $500 locker and ends up seeing stars after encountering his telescope. In a little town like Ponder, there can sometimes be less to go around, but the buyers are reminded once again what can often be found in small packages.
65	15	"Pirates of Pantego"	Pantego	November 12, 2013
The buyers return to the small town of Pantego. Ricky and Bubba buy a furniture locker for $250 and go over the top with a find. Jenny spends $500 with a unit that has a small amount of stuff in it but ends up with a big payout. Mary purchases a unit with old boat parts for $500 that she thinks are valuable, but when she gets them appraised by her dad she ends up being wrong (the boat motor, being cast iron instead of aluminum, is only worth 10 cents a pound). Cowboy Matt Belvins arrives to the auction for other things but not to buy lockers.
66	16	"Float Like a Bubbafly"	Dallas	November 12, 2013
The auction action takes place in Dallas, where the big crowds get a jolt from the big wallet of Kenny Stowe from east Texas. Bubba flies in solo to the auction. Kenny Stowe and Bubba battle each other out for lockers to see who can by more lockers, who will win this fight. Jenny fires her shot in the battle between the sexes while Mary aims to please and ends up with a real clown.
67	17	"Excuse Me, I Think You're Stupid"	Fort Worth	November 19, 2013
The buyers, once again, arrive in Fort Worth looking for bargains. Ricky and Bubba steal a $600 locker as Matt Belvins and Kenny Stowe are bidding each other up and end up scoring a collection of potentially valuable rockets. Jenny battles to a $750 locker that contains much furniture and endures an old clothing-making device. Matt Belvins purchases an $850 unit and finds an antique map of Texas (which he initially dislikes, as it shows the Texas Panhandle separately from the rest of the state) but ends up in the hole on his purchase. Kenny Stowe buys nothing because, as he says, he only buys smart, not stupid.
68	18	"Grounded & Pounded"	Plano	November 19, 2013
The buyers visit a storage auction in Plano, where the locker prices go up quite quickly. Ricky arrives solo to the auction and buys a unit for $2,600 containing good quality furniture and a bonus find he wasn't expecting and does well. Kenny buys a locker with "a little bit of everything" for $1,350 and gets pounded with his find, literally (he finds a mixed martial arts grappling dummy). Jenny plans to throw off Mary's thoughts and plans that she has, but ends up throwing off herself in the process. Mary and Jenny battle it out for a locker they both want, but Mary ends up winning the bidding war and receiving the locker for $1,800 and finds a fake pregnant belly that's worth more than she thought.
69	19	"Hell's Half Acre"	Fort Worth	December 3, 2013
The bargain hunters approach the town of Fort Worth, and the home of Hell's Half Acre once again inspires hot blood and sharp tongues. Bubba, going solo, reckons with both East Texas Kenny and Cowboy Matt to win prize finds. Mary on the other hand buys a locker for $1,025 and could be the one reeling in the big catch of the day. Bubba buys an $1,100 after a bidding war with Kenny and goes James Bond style with a hidden camera. Matt Blevins goes all in on an $800 locker and takes a big hit, literally. Kenny Stowe battles everyone for their money and the lockers but turns out getting zero items to return home with. Jenny Grumbles is nowhere to be seen.
70	20	"Fear the Short Fat Man"	Waxahachie	December 3, 2013
The bidders journey to the Dallas suburb of Waxahachie. Ricky and Bubba score some green. Mary's scandalous find could earn her a huge profit; Marry gets a buzz from a hand-powered machine.
71	21	"Pow! It's a Surprise!"	DeSoto	December 10, 2013
The bidders travel to the city of DeSoto looking for profitable lockers. Jenny wins a $450 locker and later creates the biggest project she ever made. Mary spends a $325 some recipes spaghetti and meatballs.
72	22	"Welcome to the World of Sonny Monday"	Fort Worth	December 10, 2013
The regulars encounter the town of Fort Worth. Ricky and Bubba Vic returns with a protégé and buys a $500 locker and the two discover an item linked to Dallas Stars captain Jamie Benn. Jenny is touched by something that is made by harp. Mary spends time and she goes home empty handed.
73	23	"Everything's Coming Up Sonny!"	Mesquite	December 17, 2013
The buyers visit the city of Mesquite on one of the hottest days of the year. Vic's protege takes a hit; Mary's discovery leads her to a llama farm, where Ricky and Bubba have been burned in the past.
74	24	"When Vic Comes to Shove"	Henderson	December 17, 2013
The buyers brawl in the city of Henderson. Victor and Sonny receive a shot in the arm. Ricky, arriving solo to the auction, buys a $325 unit with much furniture and encounters a bullet-proof shield that scores him high above the rest of the competition. Jenny arrives on four wheels.
75	25	"Waltz Across Texas"	Longview	December 24, 2013
Bubba works solo in the city of Longview. Bubba's $825 locker, and also his bad mood, allows him to find a whiskey making machine that he hopes will turn his frown upside-down. Mary attempts to balance her energy flow, which allows her to purchase a $600 unit full of furniture and other items and does alright for the day. Jenny vows to herself that she will go big or go home. Kenny, arriving in a good mood, buys a $600 unit with many boxes and other assorted items and later finds a dancing dress which earns him gets an unexpected dance partner. With the moods and feelings of other buyers, that will allow them to get them to great heights or be thrown off by big falls at the auction.
76	26	"Puffy the Auction Slayer"	Haslet	December 24, 2013
The bidders seek treasures in the upscale hamlet of Haslet; Ricky's mother, Puffy, clashes with Lesa; Jenny and Mary take gambles; Ricky ventures where men fear to tread.
77	27	"For the Benefit of Mr. Charles"	Longview	January 7, 2014
All the buyers, plus Matt Blevins, use all sorts of new strategies on their opponents in Longview. Jenny employs a new strategy on the crowd and her competition. Matt Blevins tries scare tactics; Mary's old friend keeps the bidders guessing.
78	28	"Moe's Def"	Fort Worth	January 7, 2014
The one and only Moe Prigoff returns and makes an appearance at the auction in Fort Worth for his annual purchase. Mary takes on her former mentor. Ricky and Bubba get devious with the lockers. Jenny seeks out store stock.

== Episode statistics ==
The episodes were not aired in the order that they were filmed. Therefore, the * column in each season's episode list indicates the sequential order of that episode.

=== Season 1 (2011−2012) ===
#	*	Title	Air date	Ricky Smith Bubba Smith		Victor Rjesnjansky		Morris "Moe" Prigoff		Jerry Simpson Lesa Lewis		Roy Williams	
#	*	Title	Air date	Spent	Net profit/loss	Spent	Net profit/loss	Spent	Net profit/loss	Spent	Net profit/loss	Spent	Net profit/loss
1	1	Texas Sold 'Em	December 6, 2011	$425.00	$3,735.00	$250.00	$870.00	$525.00	$14,215.00	N/A	N/A	————	————
2	2	Bounty Hunter Bubba Fett	December 13, 2011	$925.00	$8,225.00	$20.00	$570.00	$750.00	$375.00	N/A	N/A	————	————
3	3	Snake, Rattle and Roll	December 20, 2011	$475.00	$7,630.00	$1,600.00	–$1,400.00	N/A	N/A	$140.00	$615.00	————	————
4	4	Mo' Money, Moe Prigoff	December 27, 2011	$1,100.00	$2,300.00	$475.00	$3,425.00	$425.00	$2,155.00	N/A	N/A	————	————
5	5	The Good, the Bad and the Hungry	December 27, 2011	$290.00	$465.00	N/A	N/A	$675.00	$2,335.00	$2,675.00	$6,248.00	————	————
6	6	Remember the Alamo?	January 10, 2012	N/A	N/A	$325.00	$365.00	$550.00	$2,130.00	$500.00	$770.00	————	————
7	7	Home on the Strange	March 6, 2012	$550.00	$760.00	N/A	N/A	$200.00	$1,385.00	$1,450.00	$8,465.00	————	————
8	8	The Surgeon, the Witch and the Wardrobe	March 6, 2012	$800.00	$160.00	N/A	N/A	$1,000.00	$2,575.00	$1,475.00	$308.00	————	————
9	9	If I Were a Tibettin' Man	March 13, 2012	$200.00	$830.00	$1,550.00	$4,325.00	————	————	$150.00	$65.00	————	————
10	10	Puffy in the Sky with Diamonds	March 13, 2012	$525.00	$49,075.00	N/A	N/A	$825.00	$675.00	$400.00	$215.00	————	————
11	11	Dallas Cowboys and Indians	March 20, 2012	$225.00	-$200.00	$30.00	$160.00	————	————	$110.00	$2,025.00	N/A	N/A
12	12	Who Bought JFK?	March 20, 2012	N/A	N/A	$175.00	$795.00	————	————	$275.00	$1,130.00	$850.00	$650.00
13	13	High Tea Tighty'	March 27, 2012	$1,025.00	$9,810.00	$550.00	$2,150.00	————	————	N/A	N/A	$650.00	$320.00
14	14	For A Few Lockers More	March 27, 2012	$325.00	$375.00	$10.00	$1,490.00	$450.00	$6,000.00	$5.00	$1,995.00	————	————
15	15	Fandom Of The Opera	April 3, 2012	$450.00	$685.00	$100.00	$305.00	————	————	$400.00	$1,065.00	$325.00	-$70.00
16	16	A Fistful Of Auctions	April 3, 2012	$350.00	$850.00	$900.00	$730.00	————	————	$350.00	$900.00	$850.00	-$727.00
		Totals:		$7,665.00	$84,700.00	$5,985.00	$13,785.00	$5,900.00	$31,845.00	$7,930.00	$23,981.00	$2,675.00	$173.00

=== Season 2 (2012−2013) ===
#	*	Title	Air date	Ricky Smith Bubba Smith		Victor Rjesnjansky		Morris "Moe" Prigoff		Jenny Grumbles		Mary Padian	
#	*	Title	Air date	Spent	Net profit/loss	Spent	Net profit/loss	Spent	Net profit/loss	Spent	Net profit/loss	Spent	Net profit/loss
17	1	Flight of the GrumbleBee	August 15, 2012	$2,600.00	$3,550.00	$250.00	$4,544.00	————	————	$575.00	$169.00	————	————
18	2	Mary Had a Little Blom	August 15, 2012	$1,600.00	$335.00	$2,600.00	$7,470.00	————	————	N/A	N/A	$100.00	$300.00
19	3	Hate to Burst Your Bubba	August 22, 2012	$750.00	-$690.00	N/A	N/A	$825.00	$100.00	$550.00	$1,360.00	$0.00	$160.00
20	4	Vic in the Head	August 22, 2012	$400.00	$740.00	N/A	N/A	$500.00	$2,000.00	$300.00	$865.00	$0.00	Shared
21	5	No Stash, Moe's Stache	August 29, 2012	$1,200.00	$1,500.00	$300.00	$1,060.00	$475.00	$1,925.00	N/A	N/A	$0.00	Shared
22	6	Out of Af-Ricky	August 29, 2012	$575.00	$1,225.00	N/A	N/A	$250.00	$915.00	$225.00	-$172.00	$0.00	Shared
23	7	Bubbapocalypse Now	September 5, 2012	$1,050.00	$3,425.00	$1,125.00	-$330.00	N/A	N/A	$325.00	$280.00	N/A	N/A
24	8	Night of the Pondering Dead	September 12, 2012	$2,900.00	$10,265.00	$800.00	$120.00	$600.00	$775.00	N/A	N/A	$0.00	Shared
25	9	Jenny Bears All	September 19, 2012	N/A	N/A	$200.00	$550.00	$1050.00	$1,800.00	$200.00	$1,110.00	$0.00	Shared
26	10	Aust-in-Translation	October 10, 2012	$4,200.00	$4,350.00	$225.00	$5,845.00	$0.00	-$1,400.00	$1,500.00	$1,810.00	$0.00	Shared
27	11	Piñatas and Ta-tas	October 17, 2012	$2,225.00	$170.00	$1,100.00	-$1,100.00	$925.00	$0.00	$600.00	$960.00	$0.00	Shared
28	12	Rhymes with Witch	October 24, 2012	$675.00	$1,175.00	$250.00	$250.00	N/A	N/A	N/A	N/A	N/A	N/A
29	13	A Jenny for Your Thoughts	November 7, 2012	$450.00	$1,860.00	N/A	N/A	$375.00	$3,545.00	$200.00	$3,650.00	$0.00	Shared
30	14	I'd Do Anything for Lesa (But I Won't Do That)	November 7, 2012	N/A	N/A	$800.00	$1,900.00	$1,400.00	$125.00	$1,500.00	$1,100.00	$0.00	Shared
31	15	Mary Defeats Auction	December 2, 2012	$2,100.00	$10,165.00	N/A	N/A	$800.00	$2,525.00	$1,150.00	$585.00	$0.00	Shared
32	16	Tank Girl	December 2, 2012	$1,500.00	$1,550.00	N/A	N/A	————	————	$650.00	$1,985.00	$40.00	$210.00
33	17	Mary's New Hoopty Ride	December 11, 2012	$1,375.00	$1,310.00	$1,500.00	$7,175.00	0.00	Shared	$825.00	$0.00	$125.00	$175.00
34	18	Breaking Bubba	December 18, 2012	$450.00	$1,550.00	$300.00	$250.00	N/A	N/A	$850.00	$500.00	N/A	N/A
35	19	Buyers on the Storm	January 1, 2013	$1,050.00	-$455.00	$225.00	-$15.00	$300.00	$1,785.00	$400.00	$995.00	$0.00	Shared
36	20	What Do Women Want?	January 1, 2013	N/A	N/A	$850.00	$580.00	$275.00	$200.00	$1,850.00	$110.00	N/A	N/A
37	21	Rules to Buy By	January 8, 2013	$1,750.00	$1,530.00	N/A	N/A	$0.00	Shared	$500.00	$320.00	$900.00	$850.00
38	22	Bubba and the Chocolate Factory	January 8, 2013	$210.00	$905.00	N/A	N/A	$375.00	$775.00	$475.00	$1,265.00	$0.00	Shared
39	23	The Cock Fighter From Mexico	January 15, 2012	N/A	N/A	$1,610.00	$3,710.00	————	————	$800.00^{1}	$120.00	————	————
40	24	You Bought It, You Break It	January 15, 2013	$275.00	$35.00	N/A	N/A	$1,400.00	$1,020.00	N/A	N/A	$0.00	N/A
41	25	A Ricky Runs Through It	January 29, 2013	$525.00	$2,525.00	N/A	N/A	$1,450.00	$4,665.00	N/A	N/A	N/A	N/A
42	26	Bronze Beauty	January 29, 2013	$350.00	$5,230.00	$550.00	$330.00	$450.00	-$100.00	N/A	N/A	$0.00	Shared
43	27	Mayor of Moneytown	February 5, 2013	$325.00	$80.00	$1,700.00	$28,000.00	N/A	N/A	$600.00	$110.00	N/A	N/A
44	28	Darth Victor	February 5, 2013	$2,100.00	$2,680.00	$700.00	$810.00	$950.00	$920.00	N/A	N/A	$0.00	Shared
45	29	Fast Times at Texas High	February 12, 2013	N/A	$100.00 _{2}	$475.00	$1,370.00	$475.00^{3}	$420.00	$1,200.00	-$1,147.00	$475.00^{3}	Shared
46	30	Shake Your Tailfeather!	February 12, 2013	N/A	N/A	$850.00	$3,710.00	$300.00	$655.00	$650.00	$540.00	$0.00	Shared
47	31	Throw Momma From the Auction	February 19, 2013	$550.00	$10,545.00	N/A	N/A	$250.00	$131.00	$300.00	$1,265.00	$0.00	Shared
48	32	The Ninja and the Pit Master	February 19, 2013	N/A	N/A	————	————	$1,600.00	$80.00	$425.00	$575.00	$0.00	Shared
49	33	Hoarder Patrol	February 26, 2013	$900.00	$2,130.00	N/A	N/A	$750.00	$725.00	$350.00	$215.00	$0.00	Shared
50	34	Hoopty Dreams	February 26, 2013	$650.00	$1,350.00	N/A	N/A	$650.00	$115.00	$400.00	$970.00	$0.00	Shared
		Totals:		$31,185.00	$69,135.00	$15,935.00	$66,229.00	$12,250.00	$15,255.50	$14,075.00	$19,540.00	$1,165.00	$9,730.50

==== Notes ====
- ^{1} Jenny and Victor split the cost of $1,600 with both of them paying $800, with Jenny taking all the furniture and a box of Beanie Babies, and Victor takes everything else in the unit.
- _{2} Ricky and Bubba didn't buy a unit, but profited $100 from Jenny who paid them to crack a safe.
- ^{3} Moe and Mary split the cost of a $950 unit, so they both paid $475 to cover the cost of the unit. They both shared the profit made on the unit.

=== Other notes ===
- In "Rhymes with Witch", Jerry and Lesa spent $875 and made a profit of $1,330.
- In "I'd Do Anything for Lesa (But I Won't Do That)", Jerry and Lesa did not score a locker.
- In "The Cock Fighter from Mexico", Rudy Castro spent $175 and made a profit of $705.
- In "The Ninja and the Pit Master", "J.D."Thorne spent $725 and made a profit of $1,900.

=== Season 3 (2013−2014) ===
#	*	Title	Air date	Ricky Smith Bubba Smith		Victor Rjesnjansky		Jenny Grumbles		Mary Padian	
#	*	Title	Air date	Spent	Net profit/loss	Spent	Net profit/loss	Spent	Net profit/loss	Spent	Net profit/loss
51	1	Raiders of the Lost Arkana	August 27, 2013	$1,300.00	$24,200.00	$600.00	-$500.00	$850.00	$1,165.00	$800.00^{1}	-$225.00
52	2	Take a Deep Breath, It's Lesa!	August 27, 2013	$450.00	$1,120.00	$850.00	$900.00	N/A	N/A	N/A	N/A
53	3	British Invasion	September 3, 2013	$1,250.00	$3,890.00	-------	-------	N/A	N/A	$250.00	$1,070.00
54	4	Swinging With the Jenemy	September 3, 2013	$3,500.00	$1,400.00	-------	-------	$300.00	$330.00	N/A	N/A
55	5	Ka-Chingaladas!	September 10, 2013	N/A	N/A	$800.00	$55.00	$900.00	$175.00	$0.00	Shared
56	6	It's Always Sonny in Texas	September 10, 2013	N/A	N/A	$700.00	$370.00	$1,300.00	$1,035.00	$0.00	Shared
57	7	Stowe-Age Wars	September 17, 2013	$1,500.00	$4,990.00	N/A	N/A	$400.00	$350.00	$0.00	Shared
58	8	Built for Pleasure Not Speed	October 1, 2013	$700.00	$575.00	-------	-------	N/A	N/A	N/A	N/A
59	9	Winners of the Centuries	October 22, 2013	N/A	N/A	$450.00	$125.00	-------	-------	$400.00	$550.00
60	10	Take That Beethoven!	October 22, 2013	$1,700.00	$3,425.00	-------	-------	$1,425.00_{2}	$0.00	$0.00	Shared
61	11	Yo! Mary Raps	October 29, 2013	$425.00	$625.00	-------	-------	N/A	N/A	$725.00	$545.00
62	12	Hands Off the Embroidery	October 29, 2013	$300.00	$1,150.00	-------	-------	$200.00	$600.00	$900.00	$2,510.00
63	13	Cardboard Couture	November 5, 2013	N/A	$100.00_{3}	-------	-------	$1,175.00	$1,665.00	$350.00	-$260.00
64	14	Spurs of the Moment	November 5, 2013	$675.00	$895.00	-------	-------	$400.00	$375.00	N/A	N/A
65	15	Pirates of Pantego	November 12, 2013	$250.00	$950.00	-------	-------	$500.00	$1,310.00	$500.00	-$381.00
66	16	Float Like a Bubbafly	November 12, 2013	$1,925.00	$435.00	-------	-------	N/A	N/A	$1,100.00	$1,300.00
67	17	Excuse Me, I Think You're Stupid	November 19, 2013	$600.00	$925.00	-------	-------	$750.00	$1,600.00	-------	-------
68	18	Grounded & Pounded	November 19, 2013	$2,600.00	$2,100.00	-------	-------	N/A	N/A	$1,800.00	$1,375.00
69	19	Hell's Half Acre	December 3, 2013	$1,100.00	$415.00	-------	-------	-------	-------	$1,025.00	$2,100.00
70	20	Fear the Short Fat Man	December 3, 2013	$725.00	$1,145.00	-------	-------	$450.00	$3,530.00_{4}	$325.00	$945.00
71	21	Pow! It's a Surprise!	December 10, 2013	-------	-------	-------	-------	$450.00	$650.00	$325.00	$285.00
72	22	Welcome to the World of Sonny Monday	December 10, 2013	$2,600.00	$1,295.00	$500.00	$1,155.00	$1,425.00	$1,625.00	N/A	N/A
73	23	Everything's Coming Up Sonny!	December 17, 2013	N/A	N/A	$1,300.00	$1,390.00	-------	-------	$525.00	$800.00
74	24	When Vic Comes to Shove	December 17, 2013	$325.00	$2,290.00	N/A	N/A	$1,200.00	$945.00	-------	-------
75	25	Waltz Across Texas	December 24, 2013	$825.00	$170.00	-------	-------	N/A	N/A	$600.00	$365.00
76	26	Puffy the Auction Slayer	December 24, 2013	$275.00_{5}	$1,325.00	-------	-------	$100.00	$2,475.00	$325.00	$745.00
77	27	For the Benefit of Mr. Charles	January 7, 2014	$2,200.00	$2,700.00	-------	-------	N/A	N/A	$1,200.00	-$375.00
78	28	Moe's Def	January 7, 2014	$1,000.00	$2,490.00	-------	-------	$1,100.00	$3,831.00	N/A	N/A
		Totals:		$26,225.00	$58,610.00	$5,375.00	$3,540.00	$12,925.00	$20,706.00	$11,150.00	$10,499.00

==== Notes ====
- ^{1} Moe and Mary buy a locker together for $800. The last episode Moe is seen in is the second episode of the third season "Take a Deep Breath, It's Lesa!"
- ^{2} Jenny and Mary end their partnership in the episode "Take That Beethoven!" after a disagreement on the project.
- ^{3} Ricky and Bubba receive $100 after winning a coin toss against Kenny Stowe.
- _{4} Jenny Grumbles said this was her best profit out of any locker she has purchased in her career. She bought the locker for $450.00 and made a profit of $3,530.00.
- _{5} Ricky brought along his mother to the auction, Puffy. They both purchased a locker and then later went through and sorted through the items/merchandise.

==== Other notes ====
- In "Take a Deep Breath, It's Lesa!", Jerry and Lesa spent $2,400 on a locker and made a profit of $320.
- In "British Invasion", David Kay spent $150 on a locker and made a profit of $3,650.
- In "Swinging with the Jenemy", David Kay spends $325 on a unit and makes a profit of $525.
- In "Ka-Chingaladas!", Kenny Stowe spent $900 on a locker and made a profit of $5,350.
- In "It's Always Sonny In Texas", Matt Blevins spent $200 on a locker and made a profit of $1,390.
- In "Stowe-Age Wars", Kenny Stowe spent $1,550 on four lockers and made a profit of $1,920.
- In "Built For Pleasure Not Speed", Rudy Castro spent $300 on a locker and made a profit of $1,050. Jerry and Lesa spent $2,150 on a locker and made a profit of $400.
- In "Winners of the Centuries", David Kay spent $900 on a locker and made a profit of $4,600.
- In "Take That Beethoven!", Jerry and Lesa spent $250 on a locker and made a profit of $925. Matt Blevins didn't buy a locker.
- In "Yo! Mary Raps", Kenny Stowe spent $300 on a locker and made a profit of $1,850.
- In "Hands Off the Embroidery", Matt Blevins didn't buy a locker. He was also warned by auctioneer Walt Cade about his conduct, being threatened with eviction from the auction.
- In "Cardboard Couture", Kenny Stowe spent $500 on two lockers and made a profit of $925. Ricky and Bubba didn't buy a locker but won $100 from Kenny betting on a coin flip.
- In "Spurs of the Moment", Matt Blevins spent $550 on a locker and made a profit of $3,745.
- In "Pirates of Pantego", Matt Blevins didn't buy a locker.
- In "Float Like a Bubbafly", Kenny Stowe spent $725 on two lockers and made a profit of $5,775.
- In "Excuse Me, I Think You're Stupid", Matt Blevins spent $850 on a locker and made a loss of -$20. Kenny Stowe didn't buy a locker.
- In "Grounded & Pounded", Kenny Stowe spent $1,350 on a locker and made a profit of $470.
- In "Hell's Half Acre", Matt Blevins spent $800 on a locker and made a profit of $485. Kenny Stowe didn't buy a locker.
- In "Pow! Its a Surprise!", Kenny Stowe spent $900 on a locker and made a profit of $2,495. Matt Blevins didn't buy a locker.
- In "Everything's Coming Up Sonny!", Kenny Stowe spent $825 on a locker and made a profit of $1,075.
- In "When Vic Comes to Shove", Kenny Stowe spent $300 on a locker and made a profit of $1,095.
- In "Waltz Across Texas", Kenny Stowe spent $600 on a locker and made a profit of $4,710.
- In "Puffy the Auction Slayer", Jerry and Lesa bought a locker for $1,600 and made a profit of $855.
- In "For the Benefit of Mr. Charles", Matt Blevins bought a locker for $850 and made a profit of $50.
- In "Moe's Def", Moe Prigoff bought a locker for $1,050 and made a profit of $878.
