= Inventor (disambiguation) =

An inventor is a person who creates or discovers new methods, means, or devices for performing a task.

Inventor may also refer to:

- Inventor (patent), the legal term referring to the claimant of a patentable invention
- Inventor (Role Variant), a psychological temperament or role, correlated with Myers-Briggs ENTP personality type
- Open Inventor, a 3D graphics toolkit
- Autodesk Inventor, a 3D Computer-Aided Design application

== Film ==
- The Inventor (1981 film), a 1981 Swiss-German comedy drama film by Kurt Gloor.
- The Inventor: Out for Blood in Silicon Valley, a 2019 American documentary film about Elizabeth Holmes and her former company Theranos
- The Inventor (2023 film), an animated film about Leonardo da Vinci.

== See also ==
- The Inventors (disambiguation)
- Inventory (disambiguation)
- Invention (disambiguation)
- List of inventors
