= Mail storage =

Storage by mail or delivery service

Mail storage is a type of on-demand self storage whereby customers send items by mail or delivery service (usually by the box) to be stored at a central location. It may be a viable option for people who prefer 'pay-as-you-go' storage, in which only items that are stored are charged storage fees, rather than renting a larger storage unit that may not be fully utilized.

== Overview ==
Mail storage may not be viable or cost-effective for those wanting to store a whole house full of belongings. It's generally an option for those who want to declutter or store a proportion of their goods for a short amount of time. Mail storage differs from traditional self-storage in a number of key ways:

- Mail storage allows customers to order boxes online or over the phone. Generally mail storage companies will send these boxes free of charge along with packing materials and tape although some may charge a small fee for this.
- Customers pack their boxes in their office or home and these are then collected by the storage company or sent directly to self-storage using standard shippers such as FedEx, UPS, US Postal Service and the like. Again, many mail storage companies offer this collection service free of charge although some will charge a fee.
- Customers pay a monthly fee per box that they store with the mail storage company. Some companies have a minimum number of boxes required to utilize the service. Others have no minimum and customers can store only one box if they so wish.
- When a customer wants a box returned, typically a request is made online or by phone, and then the box(es) are returned per an agreed-upon timeframe.

== Mechanisms ==
Typically, customers sign-up online with a mail storage company. The customer can then order boxes from the storage provider or they can use boxes that they already own. The storage company arranges for the packed boxes to be collected from the customer's pick-up location. The boxes are then transported to the storage company's secure warehouse to be stored until the customer requests their return. The storage company then arranges for the box(es) to be returned – typically within 24 hours (if it falls on a weekday).

Mail Storage requires more stringent and diligent packing than standard moving, since the packages will be handled by shippers or a mail storage company's pickup/delivery service. For example, the thin walls of standard moving boxes cannot withstand the multiple transfers, stacking and other rigors of the shipping / mailing process. Further, failing to pack the boxes fully may result in boxes that "cave in" when other boxes are stacked on them. Mail Storage companies often request customers to use thick walled or reinforced shipping boxes, to reinforce the seams with heavy duty packing tape, and to pack boxes to their fullest (while not over-stuffing them). This advice applies to boxes provided by Mail Storage firms as well as boxes provided by the customer. Many mail storage companies charge re-boxing and handling fees for boxes that are poorly packed or damaged on arrival. In addition, insurance charges that were paid by customers may not apply for boxes that were damaged in transit.

== History ==
Mail storage is a relatively new concept with startup companies in Great Britain and the US. In the US, many companies have launched and continue to offer services today, while a few early innovators are no longer in business. The market has quickly evolved to become specialized, with a number of variations on the initial Mail Storage concept currently being offered. For example, services that target the higher education populations offer drop off and pick up to college dormitories, and "micro self-storage" services offer less-than-full storage containers delivered to a residence. Some services provide customized cardboard or plastic boxes and/or packing materials as part of the cost, standardizing the boxes for optimal storage while adding a requisite waiting time for the packing materials and boxes to arrive. Other variants allow customers to self pack and send boxes directly to self-storage one box at a time (or as many boxes as needed) and offer to-the-doorstep delivery in another location, eliminating the requirement to pick up items in the same location as where they were stored.

== See also ==
- Self-storage box
- On-demand outsourcing
