= Inventory management =

Inventory management may refer to:

- Inventory management (business): the function of understanding stock mix of a company and the different demands on that stock
- Inventory management (video games), when a player adjusts the items in their inventory

== See also ==
- Inventory management software
- Inventory (disambiguation)
- Management (disambiguation)
