= Alexander Gordon Smith =

British fiction writer

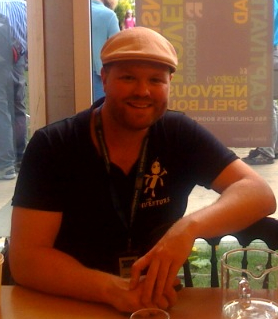
- Born: February 27, 1979 (age 47); Norwich, England
- Occupation: Novelist
- Writing career
- Period: 2007–present
- Genres: Young Adult and Children's fiction
- Notable work: Furnace
- Website: www.alexandergordonsmith.com

Alexander Gordon Smith (27 February 1979, Norwich, England) is an author of children and Young Adult fiction.

== Early life ==
During his teenage years, Smith went through what he calls a "rough patch". He said he would hang out with people that had a negative influence on him. He had once lost a tooth in a brawl. After he stopped being around his "friends", and these experiences, along with wondering what would have happened if he kept being around this group of people, are what partly inspired the Furnace series.

== Profile ==
Between 2000 and 2003 he studied English literature at the University of East Anglia, where he set up a small poetry press called Egg Box Publishing. Egg Box published a number of new poets, including Richard Evans, Ramona Herdman and poetry collective Aisle16, and continues to add to its list of books.

In October 2004, Smith published a creative writing guide, "Inspired Creative Writing", for Infinite Ideas Ltd. A follow-up guide, "Writing Bestselling Children's Books" was published in July 2007.

== Novels for children ==
In Summer 2005, Smith and his nine-year-old brother Jamie Webb began writing The Inventors, a children's novel. The book was shortlisted for the Wow Factor, a national competition run by Waterstones and Faber and Faber publishers, and although it lost out to Sarah Wray's The Forbidden Room it was taken on by Faber and published in April 2007. The sequel, The Inventors and the City of Stolen Souls, was published in June 2008.

== Bibliography ==
=== Fiction ===
==== The Inventors ====
- The Inventors (2007) ISBN 0-571-23310-4
- The Inventors in the City of Stolen Souls (2008) ISBN 978-0-571-23843-9

==== The Furnace (Escape from Furnace) ====
- Furnace: Lockdown (2009)
- Furnace: Solitary (2010)
- Furnace: Death Sentence (2011)
- Furnace: Fugitives (2012)
- Furnace: Execution (2012)
- The Night Children (2012) (novella)

==== The Fury ====
- The Fury (2012)
- The Storm (2013)

==== The Devil's Engine ====
- Hellraisers (2015)
- Hellfighters (2016)
- Hellwalkers (2017)

=== Nonfiction ===
- Inspired Creative Writing (2005)
- Writing Bestselling Children's Books (2007)
