= Inventory (disambiguation) =

Inventory is a stock of goods and materials held by a business.

Inventory may also refer to:

== Arts, entertainment, and media ==
- Inventory (artists), a group of British artists
- Inventory (film), a 1989 Polish drama film directed by Krzysztof Zanussi
- Inventory, item storage available to a character in a video game
- Inventory, in music, the first useful characteristic of a partition; the set classes produced by the union of the constituent pitch class sets of a partition
- Advertising inventory, space available for showing advertising

== Assessments ==
- Moral inventory, self-examination by a member of a twelve-step program
- Strong Interest Inventory, a tool used in career assessment

== Other uses ==
- Computer systems use inventories internally:
  - Computer hardware inventories, lists of available components
  - Data inventories, resembling repositories
  - Software inventories, available code, not necessarily used
- A phonological inventory, the set of articulatory or manual gestures in a lect
  - A consonant inventory, the set of consonants in a lect
  - A vowel inventory, the set of vowels in a lect
- Naval Vessel Register (NVR), the official inventory of ships and service craft in custody of or titled by the U.S. Navy

== See also ==
- Invent (disambiguation)
- Inventor (disambiguation)
- Storage (disambiguation)
