= Store =

Store may refer to:

== Enterprises ==
- Retail store, a shop where merchandise is sold, usually products and usually on a retail basis, and where wares are often kept
  - App store, an online retail store where apps are sold, included in many mobile operating systems
  - Department store, a retail store offering a wide range of consumer goods
  - Warehouse club (or wholesale club), a no-frills retail store, usually selling a wide variety of merchandise, in which customers may buy large, wholesale quantities at low prices
- Warehouse, a location where items are stored, e.g., a ship's paint store, and sometimes sold, e.g., Costco Warehouse Club

== Arts, entertainment, and media ==
- The Store (ITV), a British shopping television programming on ITV1
- The Store (novel), a 1932 novel by Thomas Sigismund Stribling
- "Store", a song by Carly Rae Jepsen from the EP Emotion: Side B

== Other uses ==
- Data store, a repository for persistently storing and managing collections of data
- Štore, a town and a municipality in eastern Slovenia
- Store, expendables released from an aircraft, such as aircraft ordnance or countermeasures
- Store, or store up, a verb meaning to compile or accumulate in a location such as a warehouse or grain silo
- Jonas Gahr Støre, Prime Minister of Norway
- Store of value, concept in economics

== See also ==
- Storage (disambiguation)
- Store and forward
- Store-within-a-store
- Archive
- , includes several Scandinavian geographical locations
