= Invention (disambiguation) =

An invention is a unique or novel device, method, composition or process.

Invention or invented may also refer to:

- Invention (musical composition), a short composition (usually for a keyboard instrument) with two-part counterpoint
- Invention (album), a 1997 collaboration by Phil Keaggy, Wes King, and Scott Dente
- Invention (Ligeti), a 1948 piano composition by György Ligeti
- Invention (film), a 2024 film directed by Courtney Stephens
- Inventions (band), an American musical group
- Inventions (Inventions album), 2014
- Inventions (Sandy Bull album), 1965
- Invented (album), a 2010 album by Jimmy Eat World
- Inventio, the method used for the discovery of arguments in Western rhetoric
- "Invention", a song by Pedro the Lion from the 1999 EP The Only Reason I Feel Secure
- "Inventions", an episode of the TV series Pocoyo

== See also ==
- Inventor (disambiguation)
- Inventive step, a requirement in patent law
