= Self storage =

Industry that rents storage space

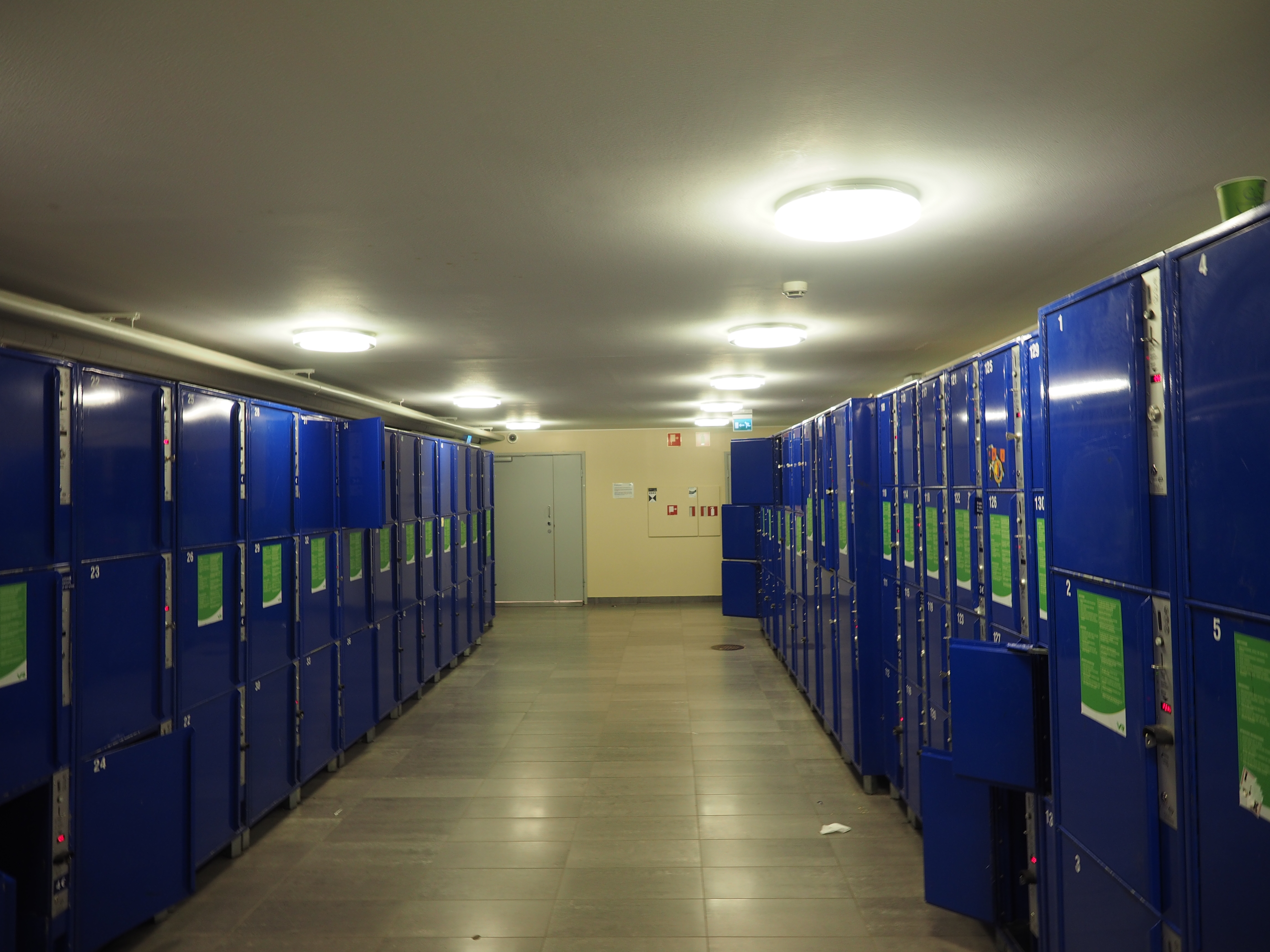
Storage lockers at the Tampere Central Station in Tampere, Finland

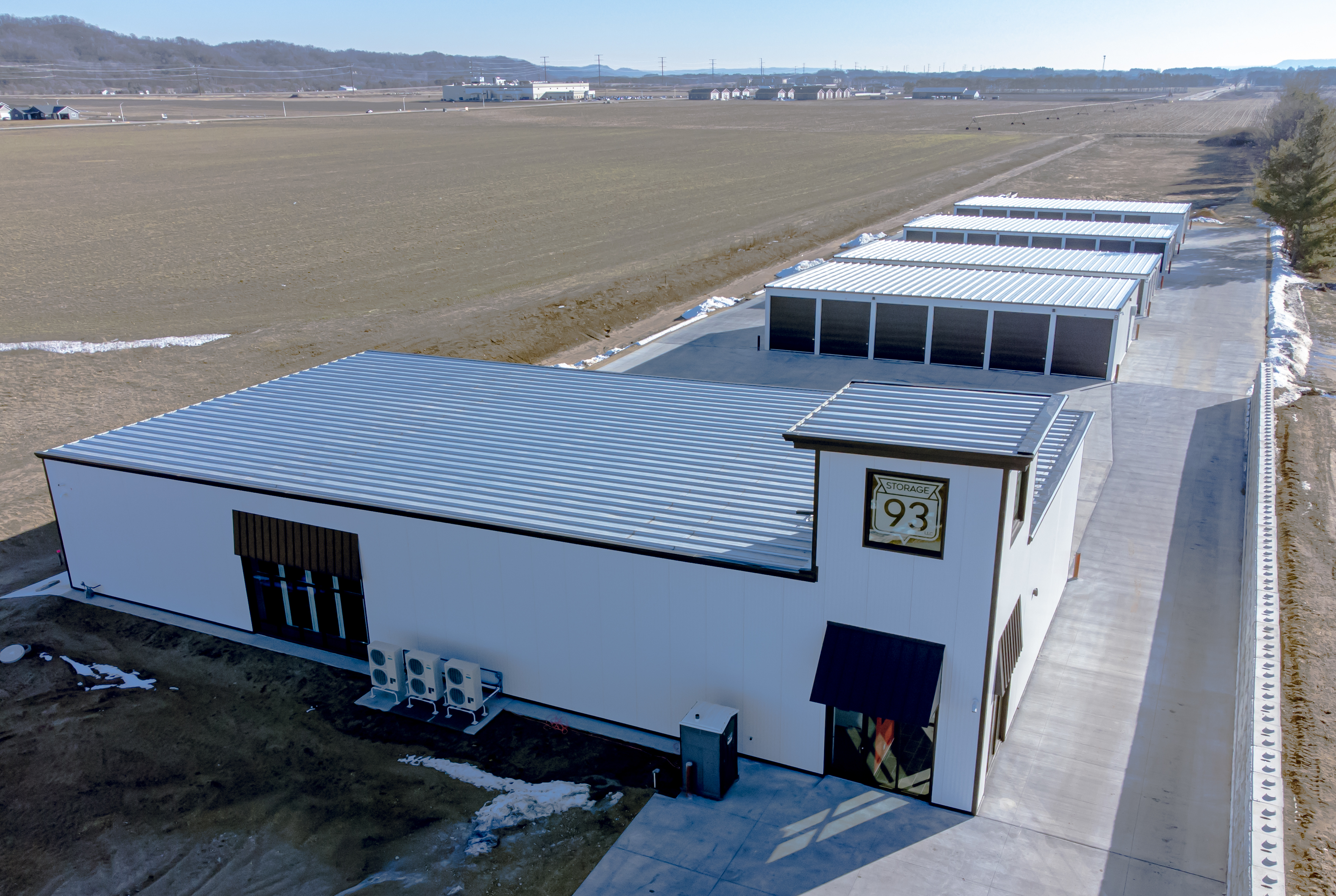
Self storage building and garages

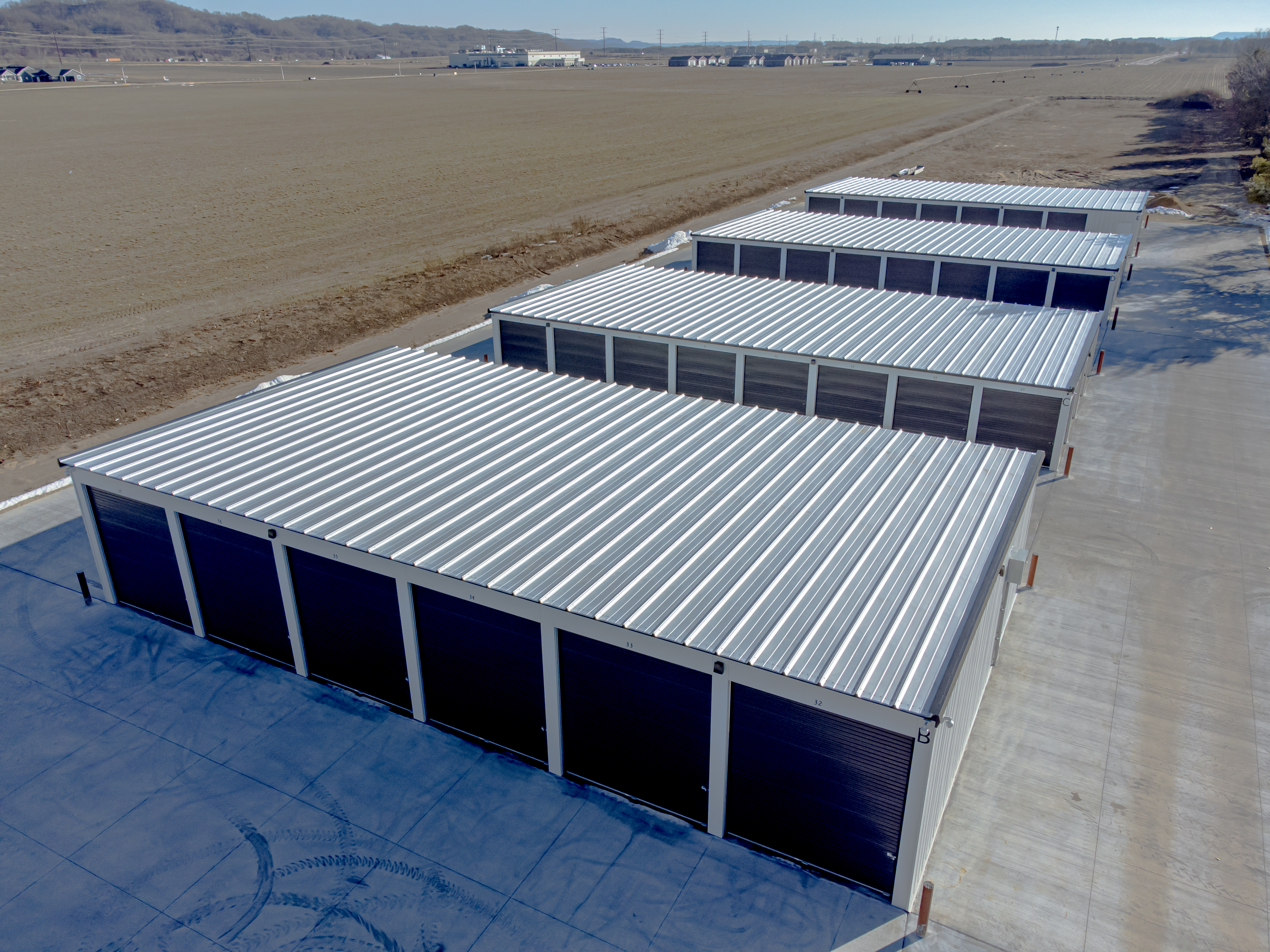
Self storage garages

Self storage (a shorthand for "self-service storage") is an industry that rents storage space (such as rooms, lockers, shipping containers, and/or outdoor space), also known as "storage units", to tenants, usually on a short-term basis (often month-to-month). Self-storage tenants include businesses and individuals.

When discussing why a storage space is rented, industry experts often refer to "4Ds of life" (death, divorce, delimitation, and discombobulation; the latter can refer to either the renter relocating to another area and needing space to store items until they can be moved to the new location, or a subsequent marriage resulting in the couple having duplicate items).

== Description ==
Self-storage facilities rent space on a short-term basis (often month-to-month, though options for longer-term leases are available) to individuals (usually storing household goods; nearly all jurisdictions prohibit the space from being used as a residence) or to businesses (usually storing excess inventory or archived records). Some facilities offer boxes, locks, and packaging supplies for sale to assist tenants in packing and safekeeping their goods, and may also offer truck rentals (or may allow free use of a truck for a new tenant).

Most storage facilities offer insurance for purchase; also, the lessor may be covered by their own insurance policy (if such policy has coverage for items stored off the premises of the insured) or may purchase insurance to cover the items (which the facility may offer as a service through a third-party carrier, and in some cases may require the lessor to purchase as a condition of rental).

The rented spaces are often secured by the tenant's own lock and key. Unlike in a warehouse, self-storage facility employees do not usually have casual access to the contents of the space (and, thus, the facility is generally not liable for theft). A self-storage facility does not take possession or control of the contents of the space unless a lien is imposed for non-payment of rent, or if the unit is not locked the facility may lock the unit until the tenant provides their own lock.

== History ==
Although there is historical evidence of publicly available storage in ancient China, modern self-storage facilities (in which the tenant has exclusive access to the storage space) did not begin to appear until the late 1960s. The first self-storage facilities opened in Texas. This was often helped by the fact that most homes in Texas do not have basements, which in other places are often used for storage.

The first self-storage facility in Europe was started in the United Kingdom by Doug Hampson, and opened in central London in 1979. Called Abbey Self Storage, it would become the first self-storage chain in Europe.

Modern storage facilities grew slowly through the 1990s, at which time demand outpaced supply and caused a rush of new self-storage developments. From 2000 to 2005, over 3,000 new facilities were built every year in America.

== Self storage today ==
At year-end 2019, there were 47,539 self-storage facilities in the United States on industrial and commercial land parcels. There is more than 1.9 billion square feet of available self-storage space in U.S. The six largest publicly traded storage operators (four REITs, and U-Haul) own or operate approximately 18% of self-storage facilities. The global industry was worth 48.02 billion U.S. dollars in 2020. More recently, in many metropolitan cities where competition among storage companies is fierce, better parcels of land near residential and commercial areas are being converted into self-storage once approved by zoning panels. Companies are becoming more adept at manufacturing these modular storage units, allowing operators to get up and running quickly. To support the need, businesses like PODS are expected to enter the modular construction effort as well.

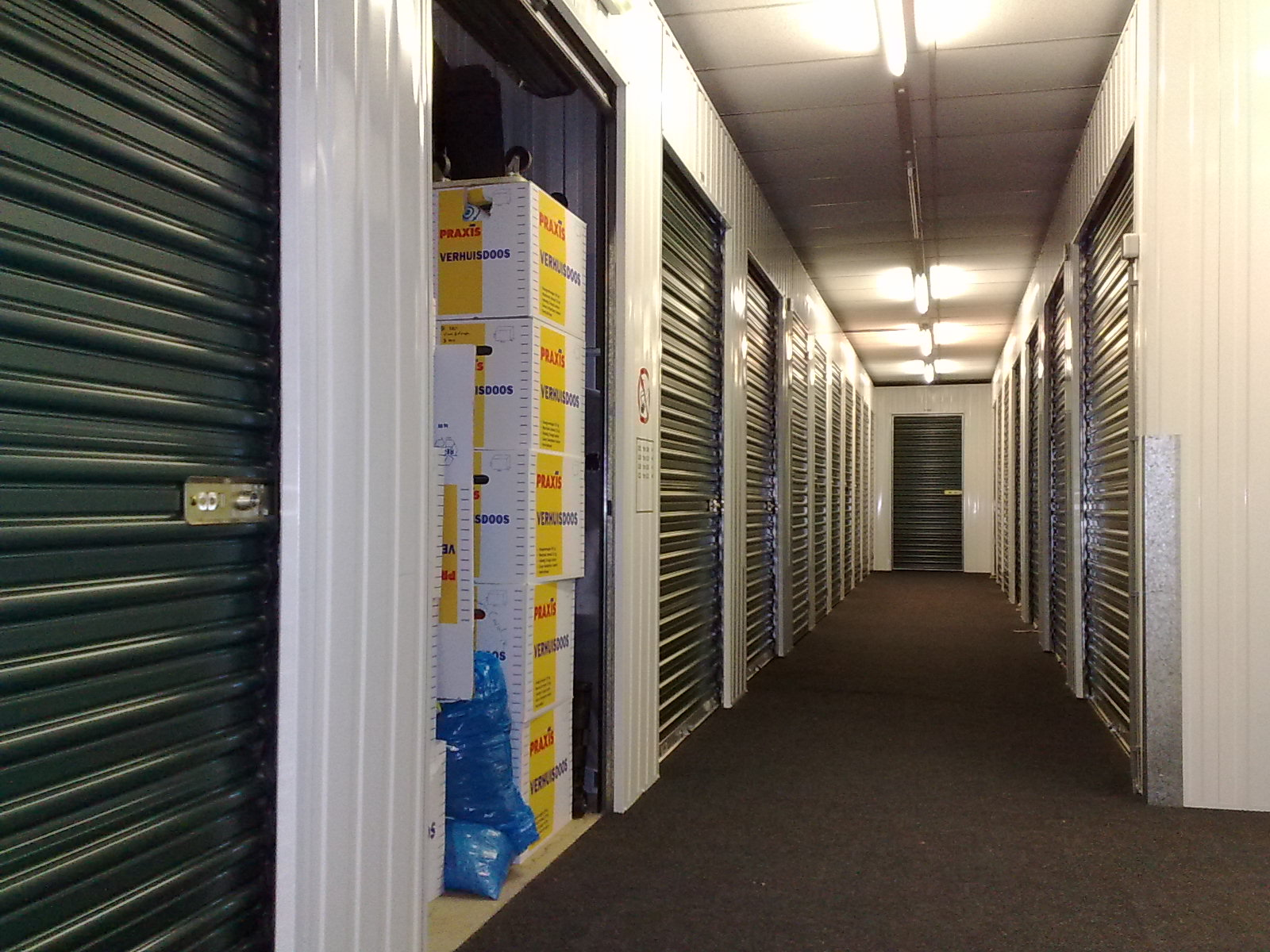
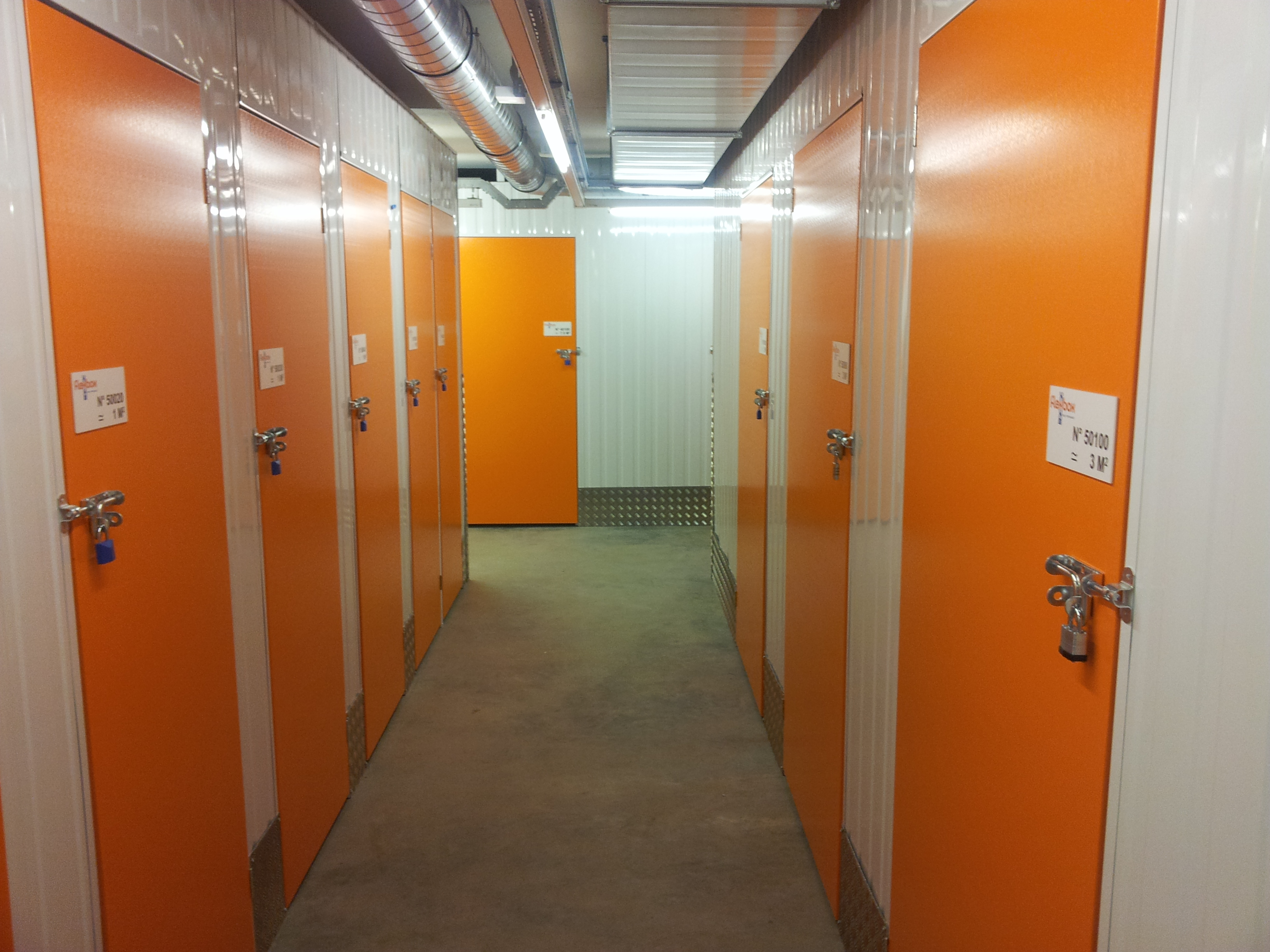
Inside a self-storage facility, with a rollup door (left) and a hinged door

Mailstorage or on-demand storage is where customers' items are kept together in a warehouse rather than providing each customer with a storage unit.

Self-storage businesses lease a variety of unit sizes to residential and business customer/tenants. Popular unit sizes (with width shown first and depth shown second) include:

- 5 ft × 5 ft (1.5 m × 1.5 m), about the size of a large Telephone booth
- 5 ft × 10 ft (1.5 m × 3.0 m), about the size of a large walk-in closet,
- 10 ft × 10 ft (3.0 m × 3.0 m), about the size of a child's bedroom (as of 2015, 10x10's are the most common storage unit size, making up 16% of the distribution in the U.S.),
- 10 ft × 15 ft (3.0 m × 4.6 m), about the size of a living room,
- 10 ft × 20 ft (3.0 m × 6.1 m), about the size of a one-car garage,
- 15 ft × 20 ft (4.6 m × 6.1 m), about the size of a large master bedroom, and
- 20 ft × 20 ft (6.1 m × 6.1 m), about the size of a two-car garage.

The storage units are typically windowless, walled with concrete cinder blocks or corrugated metal, and lockable by the renter. Each unit is usually accessed by opening a roll-up metal door, which is usually about the same size as a one-car garage door (smaller units may be accessed by a hinged metal door). A controlled access facility may employ security guards, security cameras, individual unit door alarms and some means of electronic gate access such as a keypad or proximity card. A few facilities even use biometric thumbprint or hand scanners to ensure that access is granted only to those who rent. Self-storage facility operators frequently provide 24-hour access, climate-controlled storage, outdoor storage for RVs and boats, and lights or power outlets inside the storage unit as amenities to set themselves apart from competitors. Some storage facilities have open roofs i.e. a wire mesh roof, which are not that secure, compared to ones that have fully covered tin roofs that provide added security and privacy.

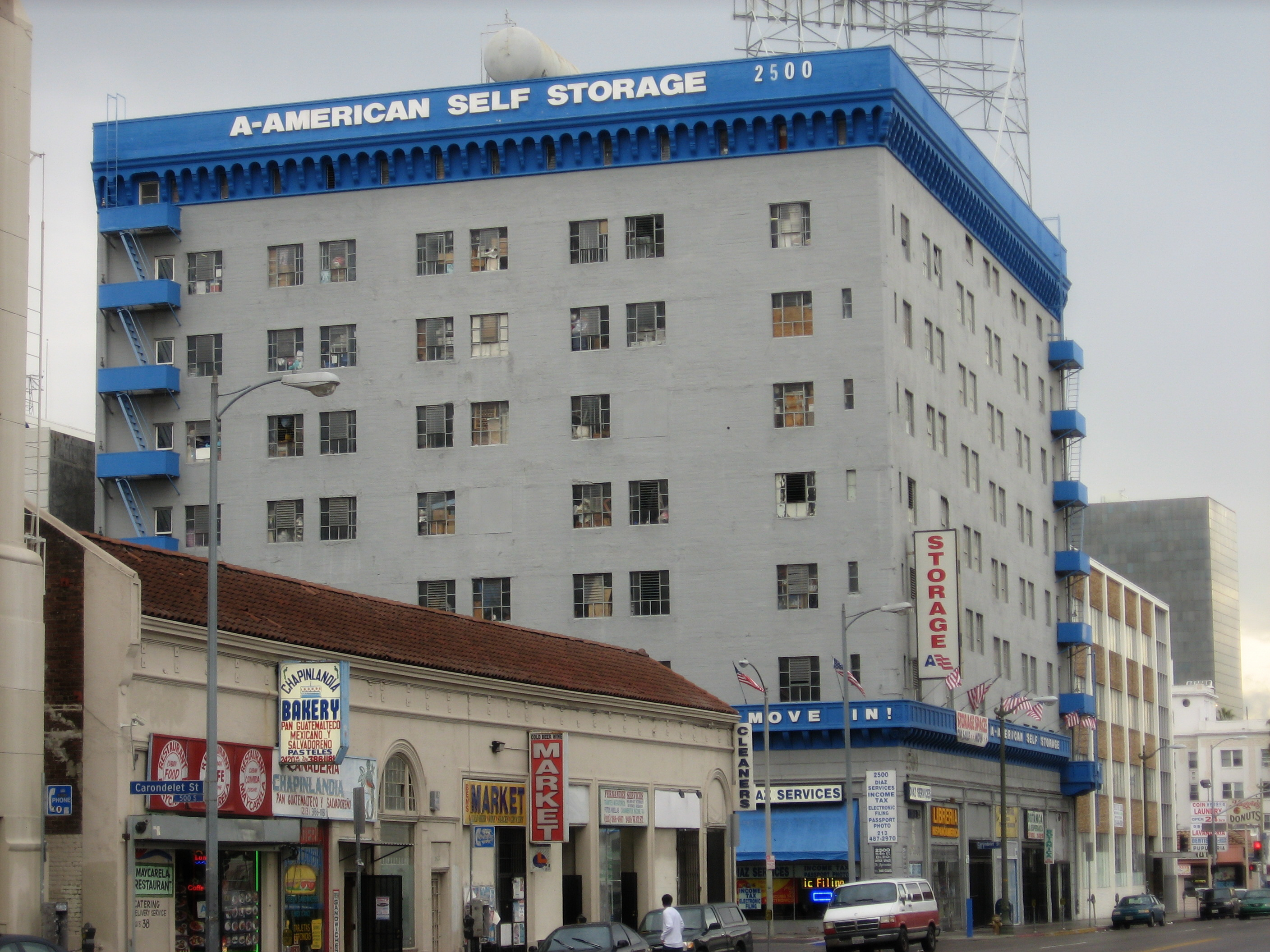
Example of an older, urban self-storage facility.

In rural and suburban areas, most facilities contain multiple single-story buildings with mostly drive-up units which have natural ventilation but are not climate-controlled. These buildings are referred to as "traditional" storage facilities. Climate-controlled interior units are becoming more popular in suburban areas. In urban areas many facilities have multi-story buildings using elevators or freight lifts to move the goods to the upper floors. These facilities are often climate-controlled since they are comprised mostly, if not totally, of interior units. Warehouses or grocery stores are sometimes converted into self-storage facilities. Loading docks are sometimes provided on the ground floor. Also, complimentary rolling carts or moving dollies are sometimes provided to help the customers carry items to their units. Urban self-storage facilities might contain only a few floors in a much larger building; there are successful self-storage businesses co-located with manufacturing plants, office tenants and even public schools.

One in ten U.S. households now rent a self-storage unit. The growing demand for self-storage in the U.S. is created by people moving (some 40 million people move each year according to U.S. Census data), and by various lifestyle transitions, such as marriage, divorce, retirement, a death in the family, etc. Recent surveys of self-storage companies indicate a positive trend in market demand and occupancy rate.

Over 54,000 self-storage facilities currently exist in the U.S. ranging from companies with a nationwide presence to companies with regional footprints or even stand-alone independent "mom and pop" facilities.

Demand for storage space remains stable as of Q4 2015. The supply for self-storage is also relatively stable. Often, the process to build a new storage building is onerous and can take years. Additionally, this specific asset class often gets pushback from communities, due to its nature.

The self-storage sector is highly fragmented, which is in contrast to other asset classes in the industry. 80% of self-storage facilities are owned by individuals or small investors.

There is a belief amongst investors that the self-storage industry is recession-proof. This belief is supported by the 5.1% total return the sector delivered to investors in 2008 during the Great Recession. The self-storage industry reported strong results during the COVID-19 pandemic. This is due to the fact that self-storage is considered to be an "essential business" in many jurisdictions so during a lockdown many facilities never closed and many people were reportedly panic buying storage units to keep valuables safe from contamination.

== Self storage worldwide ==
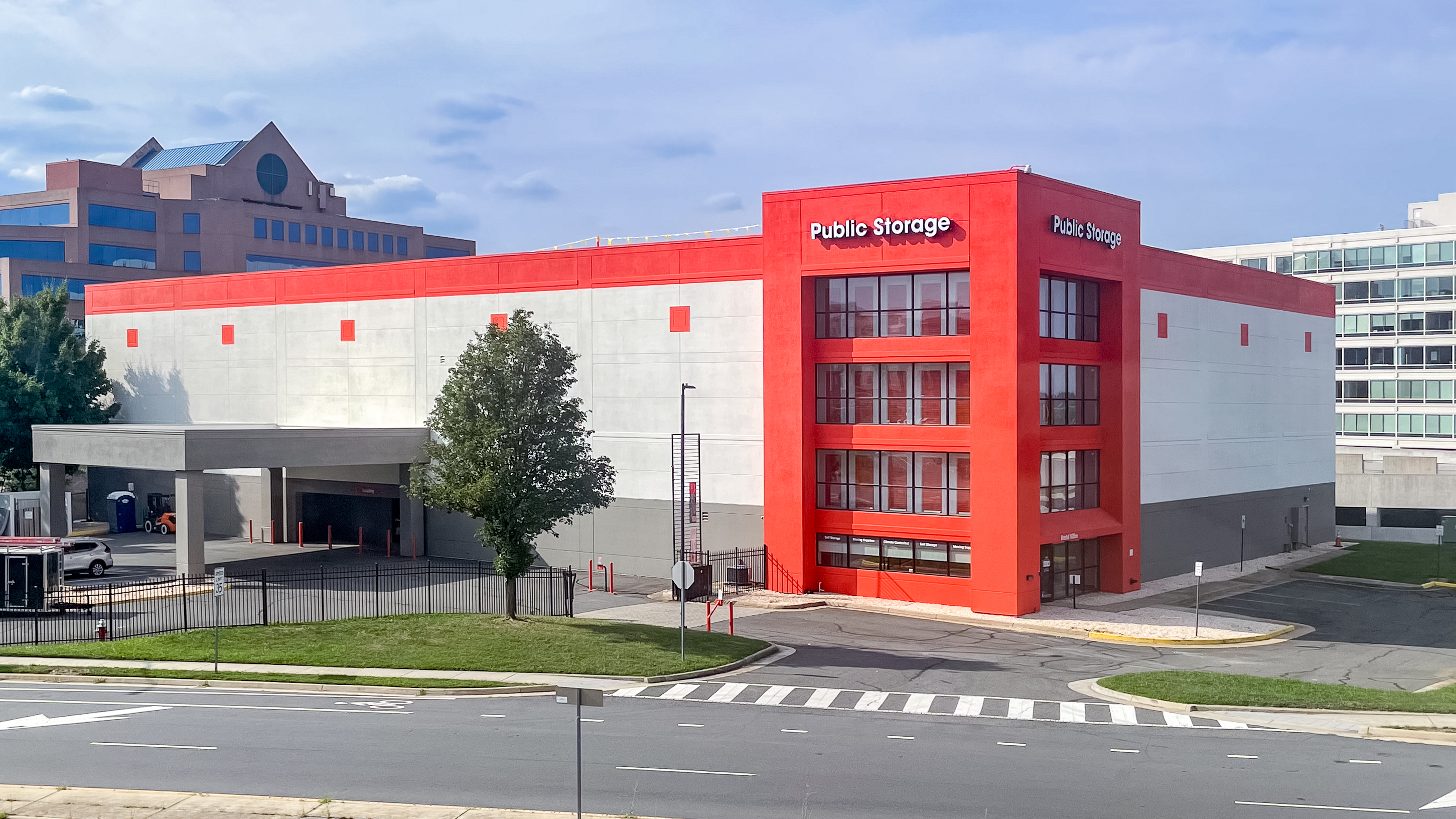
Self-storage building in Fairfax County, Virginia

Self-storage or variations on the business model are now found in many parts of the world. In 2014, FEDESSA, the Federation of European Self Storage Associations, published a report about the state of the self-storage industry in Europe. In this report, it was estimated that 975 facilities exist in the United Kingdom, 430 in France, 264 in the Netherlands, 210 in Spain, 131 in Germany, and 112 in Sweden. No other country in Europe had more than 100 facilities. Overall, the report estimated 2,391 total facilities in Europe, or about 75 million square feet of rentable storage space. This compared with over 52,000 facilities in the US (236 million square feet), and 1,100 facilities in Australia (39 million square feet). In the UK, charges are related to capacity in ft², transportation, hour/loading, with low-cost alternatives to traditional self-storage.

=== Hong Kong ===
Fire safety regulation and compliance in self storage facilities in Hong Kong became a focal point after the deaths of two firefighters in the Amoycan Industrial Centre fire that happened in June 2016. The fire led to discussion in the Legislative Council, and the subsequent tightening of guidelines led to the closure of several operators and prosecution of others.

=== Singapore ===
The industry in Singapore underwent a lengthy review by the industrial development agency, JTC Corporation (JTC) which started in 2021 with a moratorium on self-storage use requests for industrial land, in the latter's prioritization of sufficient industrial land for future manufacturing use.

The review, which concluded in January 2025 and took effect in April, affected major players with regional presence like StorHub, Extra Space, Storefriendly, and Lock+Store, as well as fewer than 10 smaller counterparts, where facilities in land zoned for heavy manufacturing— or in core areas prioritized for non-self storage usage—have to move out after their lease expiry. Some of these lease expiry range from two to four years, with some extending to 2030. All new sublet, assignment and lease renewal applications for self-storage activities outside of land reserved for self storage will be subject to assessment by JTC.

=== Thailand ===
Self storage is a comparatively young real estate segment in Thailand, having emerged in the 2000s and expanded rapidly in the 2010s. Growth has been attributed to urbanisation, shrinking condominium unit sizes, and demand from small and medium-sized enterprises and e-commerce sellers, with the sector generally treated by investors as an alternative asset class rather than a core one. Facilities are concentrated in Bangkok, with a smaller presence in Phuket, Pattaya, Chiang Mai and other provincial centres.

In June 2026, self-storage assets were incorporated into a real estate investment trust in Thailand for the first time. KPN Real Estate Investment Trust (KPNREIT), managed by Blue Whale Asset Company Limited, invested THB 60 million to acquire 30-year leasehold rights over the i-Store Sukhumvit 71 facility together with its operating assets, with the transfer and leasehold registration completed on 15 June 2026. The transaction was described by industry observers as an indication of the sector's growing acceptance as an income-generating property class.

=== South Africa ===
Self storage in South Africa is a young industry, but has shown considerable growth in recent years. The largest storage unit company is Cape Town-based Stor-Age, which operates locations across multiple South African provinces.

=== United States ===
Municipalities in the United States placed moratoriums on new self-storage businesses since where construction of new self storage facilities have spiked after 2016. They include Rock Hill in South Carolina, Pompano Beach in Florida, Birmingham in Alabama, Milford in Connecticut, Nampa in Idaho, and Vancouver in Washington. Officials cite reasons including land prioritization, unsightliness, and low job yield compared to land use. Other municipalities placed stipulations instead. For example, in Denver, self-storage is restricted within a quarter-mile of any light-rail train station and in Sacramento, they are not allowed in the area of Stockton Boulevard and Broadway to make the space "more walkable".

== Storage auctions ==
In the United States, self-storage facilities may hold storage auctions or lien sales to vacate non-paying tenants according to their enforcement rights that are outlined within the lien law of each jurisdiction. In Canada, the process and legal requirements are outlined in the Repair and Storage Liens Act.

Facilities owners are generally required to first notify the tenant of the outstanding debt, commonly by certified or registered mail to the address on file with the facility. If the debt remains unpaid, the facility must then give public notice of the sale or auction, generally in a newspaper of general circulation in most states, though some states may allow public notice of sales to be done via the internet. The tenant has the right to pay their outstanding bill at any time until the moment the auction begins and thus reclaim rights to the unit and their items; those units would be removed from the auction (which, in some cases, may result in the entire auction being cancelled).

The auctions/sales are open to the general public, with most bidders buying for the purpose of reselling for profit. Once the auction for a unit starts, the door to the unit is opened and potential bidders are allowed to view the contents only by looking in from the doorway; they may not step inside, touch, or move any of the contents prior to the auction. Generally, the spaces and their contents are sold "as is, where is" with no warranties or guarantees implied or provided, and the terms of sale are cash-only upon conclusion of the auction. The purchaser of a unit takes possession of its entire contents and is responsible for removing them within a set period of time. In some cases, the facility may allow the purchaser to rent the unit and/or charge a refundable deposit for cleaning of the unit once it has been emptied.

Certain jurisdictions require facility owners to immediately confiscate controlled items such as firearms if they are in plain sight within a delinquent unit. Also, a jurisdiction may require the purchaser to turn over some items (such as family photos and tax/business records) to the facility owner.

In the fall of 2010, two new television programs featuring storage auctions, Storage Wars and Auction Hunters, were released. The popularity led to additional shows such as Storage Hunters, Storage Wars: Texas, and Storage Wars: New York which helped increase the visibility and interest of storage auctions. Storage Wars: Canada also debuted on the Outdoor Living Network in 2013.

== See also ==
- Compulsive hoarding
- Panic buying
- Self-storage box
