= The Inventors (novel) =

2007 novel by Alexander Gordon Smith and Jamie Webb

- First edition cover
- Author: Alexander Gordon Smith & Jamie Webb
- Cover artist: Sue Mason
- Genre: Fiction, Action/Adventure, Sci-Fi, Fantasy
- Publisher: Faber & Faber
- Publication date: April 2007
- Media type: Paperback
- Pages: 384 pp
- ISBN: 978-0-571-23310-6
- OCLC: 77256984
- Followed by: The Inventors and the City of Stolen Souls

The Inventors is a children's novel, co-written by Alexander Gordon Smith and his brother Jamie Webb. It follows the story of two best friends, Nate and Cat, young inventors who win a year-long scholarship at Saint Solutions, a giant skyscraper. There, under the eye of the world's greatest inventor, Ebenezer Saint, they are given free rein to invent whatever they want. But things take a dark turn when Saint refuses to let them leave the complex, and what started as the opportunity of a lifetime turns to a fight for not only their lives, but for the world.

The book was shortlisted for the Wow Factor.

== Plot summary ==
Nate is at home, about to test his latest invention - a machine that can dress humans, like in cartoons. However, the invention goes wrong and ruins his room, upsetting his parents. Nate goes to his best friend Cat's house, to test their latest invention, the Bully Blow - also known as Pergophosphaticus III - a goo-like substance that causes whoever eats it to turn blue. They test it on the school bully by putting some in her chocolate brownie, but it is confiscated by the Headmaster, who turns blue when he eats it. Rather than getting Nate and Cat into trouble, he asks them to take part in Ebenezer Saint's competition. They have under a week to invent something so good that Saint's company, Saint Solutions, will take it on. The winners will be given a year-long scholarship at Saint Solutions, working with Ebenezer himself. After many failed attempts at making Facial-Recognition Glasses, they decide to use the Bully Blow, now in the form of a helmet for the army, allowing the wearer to blend in with the surroundings by turning the appropriate color. Saint loves their invention, and they, along with the other winners, are taken to Saint Solutions. At Saint Solutions, they soon realise that Saint is reluctant to let them leave. He wants to create a nuclear bomb to wipe out the world and start again. However, the kids escape, but Nate and Cat stay behind to stop his bombs from being sent out. They use an EMP Cat hid on the bombs to detonate them early, with the duo just managing to escape before the compound is destroyed, along with Saint. In an epilogue, it is revealed that Saint's memory was saved onto a computer, which downloads his mind into a robotic body. As his memories come back, the robotic Saint heads for the exit.
