= On-demand outsourcing =

Type of business outsourcing

On-demand outsourcing is a trend in outsourcing wherein major internal operations processes of a company are being shifted to a provider that is paid for by the number of transactions involved. The business transferring the services pays for the quality, special skills and the competence of the service provider's employees. There has been an expansion of the outsourcing concept to include on-demand outsourcing. This refers to the process undertaken by business managers to adopt an outsourcing policy that ensures that the specific business and supplies including technical manpower are accessed as the need arises. It focuses a business strategy to improve its goods and services and to drive a business towards quality improvement.

== Background ==
The reasons for general outsourcing can be summarized in following factors: the rising wages of the domestic worker, or companies wish to gain access to the exceptional capability. The risk of outsourcing service is normally assumed by the outsourcing service provider, not by the companies themselves. Nowadays, outsourcing on demand is preferred by many because of its ability to reap diverse sources of material and labour supply. Under this strategy, the driving motivation is the desire for business diversification and quality.

This type of outsourcing becomes more popular as service providers may not be able to outsource their employees on a daily basis owing to high demand and workload. Therefore, the service provider has to consider the order of resource allocation into different departments, according to the needed level and price offset by the companies. It is common that the companies will always outsource for their core business.

== Essence of strategic on-demand outsourcing ==
The most important difference between this type of outsourcing and general outsourcing is the critical transfer of ownership of the organisation from to a service provider. In an ideal on-demand outsourcing, there is an important passage of factors of production from the owner to the service provider. It encourages a system where business exists in a simple but comprehensive relationship. In some cases, the employees and entire human resources is transferred to the service provider. Notably, in order to undertake a strategic outsourcing, there are conditions that have to be met. Firstly, it should include the creation of a competitive advantage; this is an important element that should form the basis of adopting this type of outsourcing. Secondly, on-demand outsourcing demands that the managers spend more time in streamlining the activities that are important for business success. In addition, they need to undertake repositioning of the business in the marketplace or achieve a dramatic increase in market share. When these elements and motivating factors are met, it will make the outsourcing strategy a competitive edge.

== Application in IT and financial sectors ==
Leading economists suggest that on-demand outsourcing use will drive business from local to international platforms. Based on the advantages and disadvantages of each sourcing strategy, a business can gain a competitive edge over the others.

=== HSBC ===
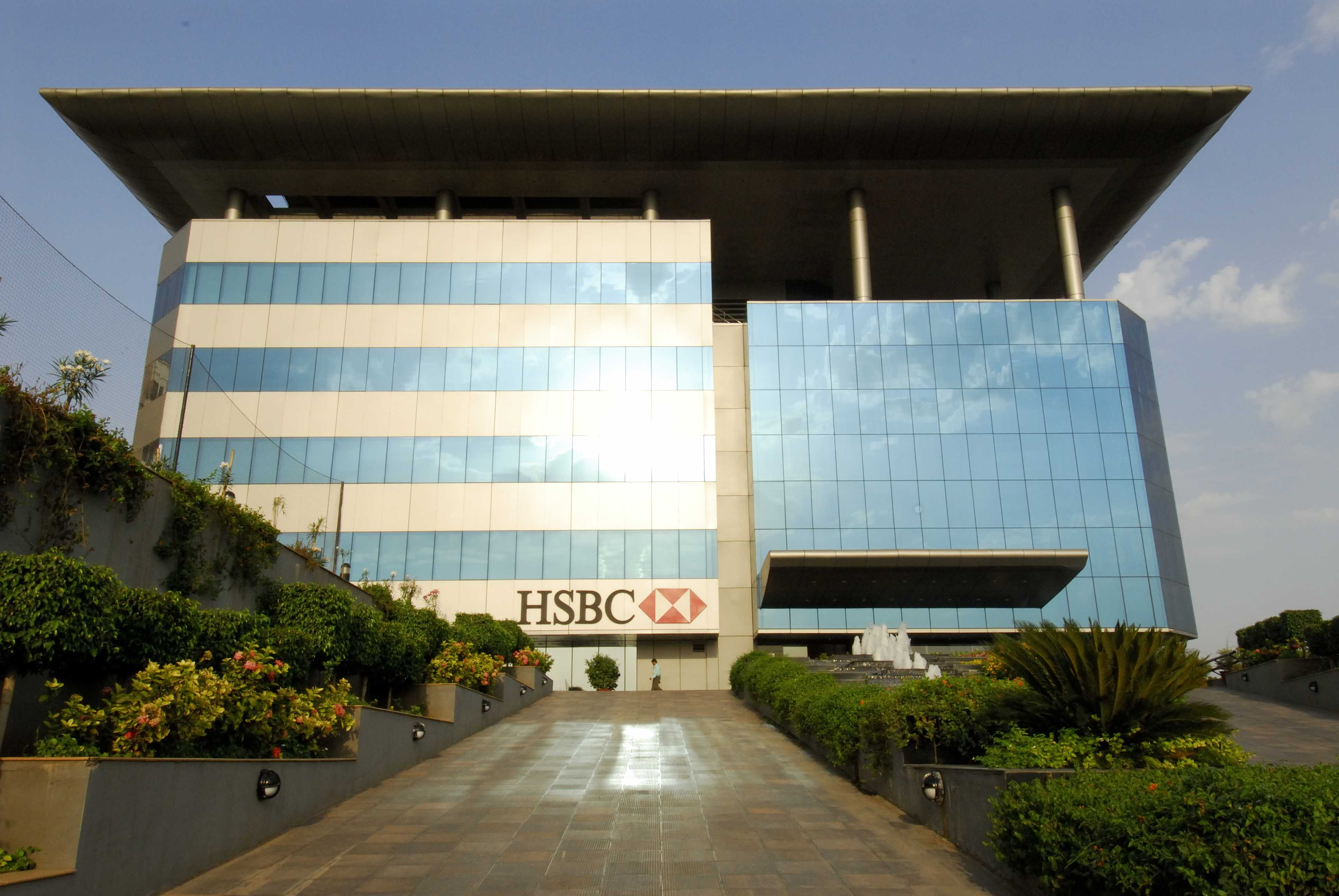
HSBC GLT PUNE

For instance, HSBC Holdings has succeeded in acquiring other companies and integrating their customers. Originally, HSBC made the decision on outsourcing mainly because the bank started to find it difficult to update its technology and services at the same pace with the rapidly changing financial and digital world. Besides their core financial business, they also started to consider improvements on their banking services part, where their reputation could be maintained and developed.

"Moreover, we wanted to be able to turn the tap on and off whenever we wanted," says Rumi Contractor, HSBC's chief information officer for Europe, who helped build the company's outsourcing center. This indicates that HSBC also seeks to put more people to work according to their different talents and skills, as the larger workforce could increase the working efficiency.

Nowadays, HSBC has over 9,500 offices in 80 countries worldwide, a huge increase from the original size of 30 people working on HSBC software maintenance in India in 2002. The "back office" mainly provides call centre and bank process services for HSBC.

=== IBM ===
IBM entered into a $5 billion manufacturing outsourcing arrangement with the Sanmina-SCI Corporation in 1992. During this outsourcing process, the expanded operations of Sammina-SCI passed the $1 billion mark. This case was the only one of the successes that IBM and their outsourcing services providers achieved from the information technology outsourcing in the early 1990s. IBM has also signed a ten-year outsourcing service plan with Bharti Airtel Ltd in Bangalore, India. In 2013, IBM prepared to renew this IT contract in India to compete with intense multinational and local Indian rivals that they had never faced before. The BPO outsourcing contract for managing software application and computer networks for Airtel is now estimated to be worth over $2.5 billion.

The two present good examples of on-demand outsourcing. Both business organizations benefited by acquiring the necessary equipment and labour from the partner company.

== Implications ==
=== Benefits ===
In the past, the purpose of outsourcing was narrow and related to business acquisition. Today, the purpose has transformed into a strategic competitive advantage. Strategic operations and on-demand outsourcing has increased business activities, creating a transformative approach that has allowed businesses to expand their operations. In addition, on-demand outsourcing has reduced unnecessary expenditures and the quality of goods and services has been excellent. One of the leading social benefits of this strategy is globalization. When this strategy is incorporated with the Internet, it facilitates e-commerce that has succeeded in building inter-business corporations. The formation of strong business relationships between partnering entrepreneurs has been immense. The social drive has been leading business managers to meet and discuss the future of their cooperation partnership jointly, thus enhancing each of their respective operations. Today, the concept of the globalization of business activities and e-commerce is no longer a . In fact, this form of outsourcing has enabled trust-building among partners, and a positive environment of building business has been created.

The economic impact has been immense; the global IT outsourcing market is projected to reach $588.38 billion by 2025, with a compound annual growth rate of 6.51% from 2025 to 2030. Over 400,000 people are now employed in outsourcing services in India according to the Pricewaterhouse Coopers Survey 2012. In addition, the growth in Europe has led to increasers employment opportunities and overall growth in GDP. Analysts believe that India is an ideal country that has undergone tremendous market revolution through a diverse on-demand outsourcing. Information Technology today commands 43% of on-demand outsourcing while finance, communication and manufacturing industries have significantly embraced this form of outsourcing as significant in achieving quality of services and reduction of costs of production.

=== Limitations ===
However, the expansion of outsourcing services brought up the issue of the loss of employees in the host country. For instance, the New York Post reported that IBM employed more workers in their outsourced service provider places, such as India, than in the U.S. Also, outsourcing may be making a big comeback, as word leaked that IBM would cut about 5,000 jobs in the U.S. and move the work to India. This may be the beginning of a new wave of exporting of American jobs to developing countries, which have large pools of well-educated workers.

== Countries involved in on-demand outsourcing ==
=== India ===
India is said to be the dominant country in providing outsourcing services in Asia, as India offers more integrated services across the offshoring spectrum, while countries such as China and Malaysia have limitations in the form of their smaller labour pools and lower-end technology in their outsourcing services.

==== Contract with IBM ====
Some Fortune Global 500 companies, such as IBM, provide outsourcing services from India. In 2012, the magazine Computer World estimated that IBM's Indian workforce surpassed its American workforce.

The annual revenue in India was growing at two-digit rate from 2005, 55% in 2005, 37% in 2006, and stayed over 30% in 2007. Apart from ITO outsourcing to India, the biggest UK flag carrier airline, British Airways, began their business process outsourcing in India in 1996. Outsourcing services started to include the British Airways customer services, also known as the World Network Services. There have been some predictions that there will be a recession in the Indian on-demand outsourcing industry in the early years. The analysis reported that India was still the world's backoffice, whereas it put too much attention to 'servicing' information technology to other countries such as the United States. As a result, India has not yet developed its own technology.

==== Future challenges in India ====
It seems that India has overcome these difficulties. However, there will still emerge new challenges that India will have to face in such a rapid-growing, competitive environment, such as they should consider recruiting the workforce based on quality and not quantity. They also need to consider further investments on training highly skilled individuals in order to fulfill the demand for a skilled workforce.

=== Europe ===
==== Factors in Europe ====
Based on an increase on-demand outsourcing concept in business platform, there has been a paradigm shift in the European market. The business outsourcing strategies now depend on five key factors, including current sourcing strategies in European markets, trends in the market, transition of services, contract laws and risks involved in outsourcing. According to a survey conducted among eight countries in Europe, Finland had 19% of its total goods and services using on-demand outsourcing while the United Kingdom and Spain were at 17%. Germany, the Netherlands and Norway had outsourced 15%, 13% and 10% of all services respectively. Notably, Sweden and Denmark had 9% of their service industries employing on-demand outsourcing. In addition, the survey revealed that the fundamental reasons for adopting this strategy was informed by three key issues.

==== Fundamental reasons ====
1. The strategy proved to be cost effective in larger-scale firms. Any leading business organizations aims to achieve operational and logistic activities that are cost effective. As an advantage, the process of on-demand outsourcing creates a confluence of activities integrated into one overall function, since this specific outsourcing strategy encourages limitation of activities, and encourages cutting down the operational and excess costs.
2. The strategy is efficient because it allows division of labour and duties of all process to the service provider. At the service provider point, there are a series of departments that specifically deals with the delegated responsibilities to achieve quality and efficiency.
3. There is marked quality improvement due to use of an external service provider. The primary goal of on-demand outsourcing is the desire of quality goods and standardized services.

== Failures ==
Dell, a privately owned multinational company based in the United States, is one of the largest technological corporations in the world, employing more than 103,300 people worldwide. However, the call center operation for the OptiPlex desktops and Latitude laptops was moved back to the United States. Dell moved its customer services and technical support centre to Bangalore in India in 2001, and set their second site in Hyderabad in 2003. However, the company found that the brand started to lose its reputation when the language and culture barrier between the customers and the employees hindered communication, especially when the employee in the Bangalore centre had professional skills but weren't experienced enough to service customers. The lack of training time on outsourcing and resolving these cultural barriers could have contributed to the strategy's lack of success. The outcome was that even though Dell's market continued to grow, customer satisfaction declined. One of the positive outcomes was that Dell started to understand the importance of outsourcing based on the average need and cost.

Forbes also concluded that some factors that may lead to failure for companies using outsourcing services, such as desire for in-house expertise and marketplace pressures.

== Emerging trends and strategy ==
With the growth of the global economy, it is believed that more countries, such as Brazil and Russia, will put their focus on providing on-demand outsourcing industries and services. From the perspective of individual companies and organisations, their local increasing labour wages, facilities cost and other competitive factors will make them use such customized outsourcing service in more areas of their business. The industry experts also predict that such specific outsourcing services will not only be used mainly in the information technology and financial sector, but more focus will be put in industries such as automobile production and medicine production.

The growth of on-demand outsourcing has hugely impacted the overall performance of outpouring in business. A majority of established businesses today have established automated payments that offset the transfer of the important business operation. The expansion of this form of outsourcing to cut a competitive edge has already greatly enriched the competitive market. In a competitive market, Internet-enabled on-demand outsourcing has created an immense cost reduction and achieved higher quality of goods and services.

In addition, globalization has enabled businesses to expand outsourcing, thus attracting diverse business partnerships that have allowed businesses to continue to flourish by bringing diversity in production and service provision.

Overall, the future of this concept remains positive as competition in the market continues to grow.

== See also ==
- Information technology outsourcing
- Business process outsourcing to India
- Banking BPO services
- Offshore outsourcing
