= Storage Wars season 6 =

Storage Wars
- Season 6

Release
- Original network: A&E
- Original release: November 11, 2014 – March 3, 2015

Season chronology
- ← Previous; Season 5

The sixth season of the reality television show, Storage Wars aired on A&E from November 11, 2014, to March 3, 2015. The season included 16 regular episodes and two new compilation episodes.

== Episode overview ==
No. overall	No. in season	Title	Location	Original release date	U.S. viewers (millions)
134	1	"Auction Boogaloo"	Stanton, CA	November 11, 2014	1.78
The buyers welcome Rene and Casey back to the auctions with a healthy dose of badgering and competition. Dave heats things up and finds a piece of board game history. Jarrod and Brandi continue to struggle to get a locker and Darrell and Brandon show their moves checked The Blastmaster XL outside of the auctions.
135	2	"My Little Brony"	Oceanside, CA	November 11, 2014	1.76
The buyers head south to Oceanside, CA. It's Rene's backyard and he intends to make the competition pay for coming down to his territory. Darrell and Brandon fight for a unit that has a piece of cinematic history while Jarrod and Brandi discover that friendship can be magic, and profitable.
136	3	"Locktoberfest!"	Montebello, CA	November 18, 2014	1.93
Darrell and Brandon return to the site of their biggest score while the other buyers are focused on taking down the self-proclaimed "King of Montebello". Jarrod and Brandi land a locker that leads them to something called a "Herbmeister" while Rene and Casey score a potentially sweet unit.
137	4	"The Emperor of El Monte"	El Monte, CA	November 18, 2014	N/A
The buyers head to El Monte, CA where they take the local competition head on. Darrell and Brandon score some antique loot while Jarrod and Brandi get a rocking good locker. And Ivy hits a score that just may lead to the mother load.
138	5	"Up the Ante in El Monte"	El Monte, CA	November 25, 2014	1.54
An auction back-to-back in El Monte, California has big lockers which means big money. Dave nabs a unit that shows he knows how to party. Rene tries to slice a bit of profit from a chilling find. Jarrod and Brandi attempt to play the other buyers, but will their strategy backfire before they can score?
139	6	"All Along the Swatchtower"	Los Angeles (Koreatown), CA	December 2, 2014	1.72
The buyers throw down at an auction in Koreatown. Dave is expecting some high end merchandise, while Darrell struggles as he has never been to this area before. Mary went to Off The Wall Antiques and Nick Metropolis. Jarrod and Brandi checked tea cups.
140	7	"A San Marcos Mitzvah"	San Marcos, CA	December 9, 2014	1.75
An auction in San Marcos brings Darrell and Brandon to their home turf and Mary finds a way to deal with inflated prices. Jarrod and Brandi buy a vintage piece that sends them spinning while Ivy discovers something that puts a song in his heart.
141	8	"A Very Miraculous Storage Wars Christmas!"	Dan and Laura's house	December 16, 2014	1.87
The buyers head to Dan and Laura's house for a special Secret Santa gift exchange, with all of the profits going to charity. However, it soon becomes a game of cat and mouse when the buyers all try to vie for the best gift. Rene finds himself becoming the easy target, while Jarrod and Brandi learn to play the other buyers off against one another.
142	9	"(North) Hollywood Hustle"	North Hollywood, CA	January 6, 2015	1.65
The competition becomes fierce in North Hollywood and even Dan and Laura can't escape the tension. Dave scores a locker that may be a hit and Rene fights past the local buyers to have some fun. Mary comes across two lockers that would be a perfect fit--if she can get them both.
143	10	"Who Let the Daves Out?"	Huntington Beach, CA	January 6, 2015	1.69
The buyers hit a vault auction in Huntington Beach where Dave decides to bring a few friends to help him out. Mary struggles to win a vault and keep her inexperience under wraps, while Rene gets wrapped up in a different way with a tough discovery.
144	11	"Gambler of Thrones"	Palm Springs, CA	January 13, 2015	1.83
The buyers head out to Palm Springs for an auction that brings sweet lockers and big money finds. Mary is worried the area may be too high society for her, while Ivy sets his sights on vintage items. Darrell and Rene battle across the auction, but only one will win the best of the best in this high-stakes showdown.
145	12	"Once Upon a Locker in the West"	Santa Ana, CA	January 20, 2015	N/A
The buyers head to Santa Ana, CA where dreams of great lockers spice up the auction. Jarrod and Brandi get a locker that leads to the sweet life while Mary tries to get something more collectable. And Darrell comes across a find that may be another huge win for the Gambler.
146	13	"Locker Mountain High"	Upland, CA and Rimforest, CA	January 27, 2015	1.97
The auction begins in Upland, CA, but Dan and Laura take the buyers on a wild ride to finish out the day. Ivy ends up with an eyeful and Mary buys early in hopes of treasure. Jarrod and Brandi along with Darrell and Brandon are forced to go deep into the high mountains for the hope of staying above water.
147	14	"Fontan-o-rama"	Fontana, CA	February 3, 2015	1.76
Fontana, CA becomes Funtana as Dave explores his lighter and Mary tries to put a little "Texas" into the auction. Darrell and Brandon have high hopes after scoring here in the past, while Jarrod and Brandi need a good hit to get them out of a bad day.
148	15	"Mr. Nezhoda's Opus"	Torrance, CA	February 10, 2015	N/A
Dan and Laura take the buyers back to Torrance for an auction that has them battling for the best unit of the day. Ivy changes up his game to stunning results and Brandi puts Jarrod on a harsh budget. Dave takes on Rene against every locker, but it remains to be seen who will come out with one of the best lockers in Storage Wars history.
149	16	"Leader of the Packed"	Bellflower, CA	February 17, 2015	N/A
Bellflower, CA hosts an auction that has high stakes and big money finds. Ivy struggles through a bad buy to find something of value, while Dave tries to find trash among the treasure. Jarrod buys a unit that becomes a horror show for Brandi, who must face her fears to get a score.
150	17	"Lock and Roll"	Mission Hills, CA	February 24, 2015	N/A
The buyers head to an auction in Mission Hills, where Ivy plans to buy a locker full of collectibles, while Darrell and Mary both hope to make an easy profit, but find the local bidders do not give up without a fight.
151	18	"Too Fast, Too Curious"	Riverside, CA	March 3, 2015	N/A
The buyers head to an auction in Riverside, where Mary finds an interesting racing item that leads to unexpected romance and a marriage proposal, while Dave finds something that leaves him baffled, and Ivy continues his search for vintage items by attempting an elusive strategy against the other buyers.
SP7	TBA	"Best Of Barry Weiss"	TBA	November 25, 2014	1.32
In this episode we take a walk down memory lane with the most "senior" buyer: Barry Weiss. "The Collector" was always better at turning the auctions into fun than profit, so we look back at his turbocharged thrills, spills, and puns... lots of puns.
SP8	TBA	"Best Of The Appraisals"	TBA	December 2, 2014	1.54
In this episode we focus on the one place that truly determines who wins or loses: the appraisals. The collectors, experts and kooks have always been happy to teach the buyers something new... or at least let them have some fun. But it always comes down to the same question: what's it worth?

== Episode statistics ==
Although revealed at the end of the episode, the totals are not always reflective and exact of the value of items in the lockers. In many cases, the values of items are estimates made on the spot by the cast members, and are not necessarily actual profits or losses. Some of the episodes were not aired in the order that they were filmed. Therefore, the * column in each season's episode list indicates the sequential order of that episode.

#	*	Title	Air date	Dave Hester		Jarrod Shultz/ Brandi Passante		Darrell and Brandon Sheets		Rene Nezhoda/ Casey Lloyd		Ivy Calvin		Mary Padian	
#	*	Title	Air date	Spent	Net profit/loss	Spent	Net profit/loss	Spent	Net profit/loss	Spent	Net profit/loss	Spent	Net profit/loss	Spent	Net profit/loss
134	1	"Auction Boogaloo"	November 11, 2014	$375.00	$520.00	N/A	N/A	$775.00	$4,135.00	$250.00	$275.00	N/A	N/A	See Notes^{1}	
135	2	"My Little Brony"	November 11, 2014	See notes^{2}		$50.00	$945.00	$210.00	$1,150.00	$500.00	$223.00	N/A	N/A	See notes^{2}	
136	3	"Locktoberfest!"	November 18, 2014	N/A	N/A	$2,695.00^{3}	-$1,165.00	$15.00	$735.00	$250.00	$1,105.00	See notes^{3}		See notes^{3}	
137	4	"The Emperor of El Monte"	November 18, 2014	See notes^{4}		$575.00	$465.00	$350.00	$1,175.00	See notes^{4}		$400.00	$698.00	See notes^{4}	
138	5	"Up the Ante in El Monte"	November 25, 2014	$750.00	$100.00	$5,000.00	$5,380.00	See notes^{4}		$1,750.00	$1,045.00	N/A	N/A	See notes^{5}	
139	6	"All Along the Swatchtower"	December 2, 2014	$950.00	$795.00	$2,825.00^{6}	$4,550.00	N/A	N/A	See notes^{6}		See notes^{6}		N/A	N/A
140	7	"A San Marcos Mitzvah"	December 9, 2014	See notes^{7}		$1,150.00	$1,650.00	N/A	N/A	See notes^{7}		$1,700.00	$2,108.00	$700.00	$1,485.00
141	8	"A Very Miraculous Storage Wars Christmas"	December 16, 2014	See Notes^{8}		Brandi: $1,000.00 and Jarrod: $25.00		Brandon: $1,000.00 and Darrell: $0.00		Casey: $600.00 and Rene: $1,725.00		$20.00		$25.00	
142	9	"(North) Hollywood Hustle"	January 6, 2015	$375.00	$915.00	See notes^{9}		See notes^{9}		$2,100.00	$5,680.00	N/A	N/A	$775.00	$1,875.00
143	10	"Who Let the Daves Out?"	January 6, 2015	$500.00	$5,875.00	See notes^{10}		See notes^{10}		$750.00	$1,400.00	$775.00	$95.00	N/A	N/A
144	11	"Gambler of Thrones"	January 13, 2015	See notes^{11}		See notes^{11}		$2,800.00	$9,950.00	$2,350.00	$1,900.00	$200.00	$356.00	N/A	N/A
145	12	"Once Upon a Locker in the West"	January 20, 2015	See notes^{12}		$475.00	$795.00	$210.00	$20,880.00	See notes^{12}		N/A	N/A	$350.00	$1,375.00
146	13	"Locker Mountain High"	January 27, 2015	See notes^{13}		N/A	N/A	$800.00	$2,390.00	See notes^{13}		$325.00	$355.00	$500.00	$2,820.00
147	14	"Fontan-o-rama"	February 3, 2015	$600.00	$445.00	$2,750.00	$1,090.00	N/A	N/A	See notes^{14}		See notes^{14}		$1,200.00	-$925.00
148	15	"Mr. Nezhoda's Opus"	February 10, 2015	$1,050.00	$4,725.00	N/A	N/A	See notes^{15}		$3,900.00	$46,100.00	$1,500.00	$3,985.00	See notes^{15}	
149	16	"Leader of the Packed"	February 17, 2015	$425.00	$5,855.00	$300.00	$500.00	See notes^{16}		N/A	N/A	$300.00	$2,268.00	See notes^{16}	
150	17	"Lock and Roll"	February 24, 2015	See notes^{17}		See notes^{17}		$850.00	$3,375.00	N/A	N/A	$1,675.00	$440.00	$500.00	$470.00
151	18	"Too Fast, Too Curious"	March 3, 2015	$400.00	$1,180.00	$500.00	$1,900.00	See notes^{18}		See notes^{18}		N/A	N/A	$275.00	$1,100.00
		Totals:		$7,500.00	$19,230.00	$15,235.00	$13,745.00	$4,810.00	$39,240.00	$11,850.00	$56,728.00	$4,800.00	$9,167.00	$3,525.00	$6,520.00

=== Notes ===
^{1} Mary Padian did not appear in the "Auction Boogaloo" episode.
^{2} Dave Hester and Mary Padian did not appear in the "My Little Brony" episode.
^{3} In "Locktoberfest!", Jarrod and Brandi bought four lockers. Ivy Calvin and Mary Padian did not appear.
^{4} Dave Hester, Mary Padian and Rene Nezhoda and Casey Lloyd did not appear in "The Emperor of El Monte" episode.
^{5} Darrell and Brandon Sheets and Mary Padian did not appear in the "Up the Ante in El Monte" episode.
^{6} In "All Along The Swatchtower", Jarrod and Brandi bought seven lockers. Rene Nezhoda and Casey Lloyd and Ivy Calvin did not appear.
^{7} Rene Nezhoda and Casey Lloyd and Dave Hester did not appear in the "A San Marcos Mitzvah" episode.
^{8} Dave Hester did not appear in the "A Very Miraculous Storage Wars Christmas" episode.
^{9} Jarrod Schulz and Brandi Passante and Darrell and Brandon Sheets did not appear in the "(North) Hollywood Hustle" episode.
^{10} Jarrod Schulz and Brandi Passante and Darrell and Brandon Sheets did not appear in the "Who Let the Daves Out?" episode.
^{11} Jarrod Schulz and Brandi Passante and Dave Hester did not appear in the "Gambler of Thrones" episode.
^{12} Rene Nezhoda and Casey Lloyd and Dave Hester did not appear in the "Once Upon a Locker in the West" episode.
^{13} Rene Nezhoda and Casey Lloyd and Dave Hester did not appear in the "Locker Mountain High" episode.
^{14} Rene Nezhoda and Casey Lloyd and Ivy Calvin did not appear in the "Fontan-o-rama" episode.
^{15} Darrell and Brandon Sheets and Mary Padian did not appear in the "Mr. Nezhoda's Opus" episode.
^{16} Darrell and Brandon Sheets and Mary Padian did not appear in the "Leader of the Packed" episode.
^{17} Jarrod Schulz and Brandi Passante and Dave Hester did not appear in the "Lock and Roll" episode.
^{18} Darrell and Brandon Sheets and Rene Nezhoda and Casey Lloyd did not appear in the "Too Fast, Too Curious" episode.
