= Storage Wars season 5 =

Storage Wars
- Season 5

Release
- Original network: A&E
- Original release: March 18 – September 30, 2014

Season chronology
- ← Previous; Season 4 Next → Season 6

The fifth season of the reality television show Storage Wars aired on A&E from March 18, 2014 to September 30, 2014, with one episode held for airing during the sixth season on November 18, 2014. The season included 29 regular episodes and six new compilation episodes.

Beginning this season, "The Collector" Barry Weiss is no longer with the show that we was departing for four seasons, having been spun off into his own series, Barry'd Treasure. However, Barry was mentioned in the episode "Grin And Barry It". Ivy Calvin and the husband-and-wife team of Rene and Casey Nezhoda joined the regular cast in this season, both of whom made multiple appearances in Season 4. Jarrod Shultz and Brandi Passante, Darrell and Brandon Sheets, and auctioneers Dan and Laura Dotson returned Season 5. Nezhoda and Lloyd did not appear in the final nine episodes of the season, allowing by Mary Padian for episodes 25-29 and the long-awaited return of Dave Hester in episodes 25-29 after one-season hiatus.

== Episode overview ==
No. overall	No. in season	Title	Location	Original release date	U.S. viewers (millions)
105	1	"Flight of the Gambler"	Montebello, CA	March 18, 2014	2.417
The buyers return to Montebello, California where Darrell has had some of his biggest scores. Will he repeat his previous successes or crash and burn? Rene and Casey try to attempt to throw off the competition, but at the end of the day they are in for more than they bargained for. Brandi learns that Jarrod is facing a problem that affects more than just their business. Meanwhile, Ivy got his skating equipment.
106	2	"The Hills Have Buys"	Rimforest, CA	March 18, 2014	2.525
It's the battle of the couples in Rimforest as Rene and Casey attempt to shut out Jarrod and Brandi. Darrell dodges a bullet to score an $1,250 locker. Rene and Casey win a unit for $750 and later have regrets because it didn't meet their expectations. Ivy meets a furry friend in his $500 unit.
107	3	"Nerds of the Round Table"	Moreno Valley, CA	March 25, 2014	2.493
Ivy attempts to keep his winning streak alive while Darrell and Rene play mind games with each other. After one ends up at a crime scene and the other takes a trip back in time, things get a little foggy for Jarrod and Brandi.
108	4	"Operation: Intimidation"	West Covina, CA	March 25, 2014	2.586
Brandi is ready to close the Long Beach store, but Jarrod is determined to save it by scoring more quality lockers. Ivy tries to intimidate the other buyers. Darrell gets the shock treatment with an item he encounters in his locker. Will Rene's cockiness get the best of him?
109	5	"The Return of the King of Montebello"	Montebello, CA	April 1, 2014	2.531
Jarrod and Brandi split up, or divide and conquer, and only time will tell if it's for good. Both of them try to buy units for both of their stores. Ivy has hired a new employee to run his shop, but will it help him or hurt him? Darrell's Montebello magic strikes again after a $2,800 unit. Rene buys a unit for $725 and later learns the art of stripping.
110	6	"For A Good Time Call... Ivy"	Riverside, CA	April 1, 2014	2.434
Darrell is up to his old tricks again, but it's Ivy who winds up pranking the competition while Rene and Casey space out. Meanwhile, if Jarrod and Brandi don't score a major profit, their new Long Beach store may have to close.
111	7	"LBC U LTR"	Long Beach, CA	April 8, 2014	1.958
Ivy is racing against time to score a locker and get home; otherwise, he'll be in the doghouse. Rene spends the most money of anyone but it's Darrell and Brandon who paint their way to success. Meanwhile, Jarrod and Brandi close their Long Beach store.
112	8	"Nuthin' But A 'G' Thang, Rene"	Riverside, CA	April 15, 2014	2.060
Rene and Casey plan to buy big and fill their truck, no matter the cost. Gossip surrounds Jarrod and Brandi's Long Beach store. Will it be too much of a distraction to overcome? Meanwhile, Darrell and Brandon jump ship.
113	9	"Boom Goes The Dynamite?"	Murrieta, CA	April 22, 2014	2.310
The buyers head to Rene's territory in hopes of schooling him on his own turf. Darrell tries to blast his way through the competition while Jarrod and Brandi get back into the locker saddle, but will their pocket-sized profits be enough to pull them out of the slump?
114	10	"Zen Masters of the Universe"	Fontana, CA	April 29, 2014	2.452
Rene is being groomed to take over the competition after purchasing 3 lockers for $2,580. At the same time, Ivy learns a lesson from his $1,300 room that changes his tune about locker buying. Darrell attempts a new approach to the business but ends up spending the most money of his career - will the locker be a big hit, or a monstrous bust?
115	11	"Darrell Sheets the Bed"	Huntington Beach, CA	June 3, 2014	1.793
Darrell's warehouse is just a stone's throw away from the auction, so he and Brandon plan to sweep up the units while Ivy and Rene team up in an attempt to shut them out. Jarrod and Brandi go on a date and fall back in love...with storage buying!
116	12	"The Donut Effect"	Rancho Cucamonga, CA	June 3, 2014	1.853
Rene and Casey make a statement by bringing a caravan of trucks, but will they buy big enough to fill them or go home with an empty caravan of trucks? Darrell comes armed with donuts in an attempt to distract the competition with a sugar rush, while Jarrod and Brandi plan a four-year anniversary party for their Orange store.
117	13	"The Gutfather"	Fontana, CA	June 10, 2014	1.651
Rene is hoping that lightning will strike twice in Fontana, but will his superstitious attitude help or hinder him? Darrell takes a cue from Brandon while Ivy gets a leg up on the competition by trusting his gut, but it's Jarrod and Brandi whom get the last laugh.
118	14	"Grin And Barry It"	Lancaster, CA	June 10, 2014	1.788
Darrell takes a visit to Ivy's backyard of Lancaster, CA to remind him who the king of storage buying really is. Does Ivy have what it takes to smoke the competition? Meanwhile Jarrod and Brandi feel surrounded by a bunch of pigs, and Rene buys a locker that's a little... crappy.
119	15	"The Adventures of Max Profit"	Moreno Valley, CA	June 17, 2014	1.829
The buyers travel to Moreno Valley, CA looking for bargains to score. Ivy is on the hunt for high-end in Moreno Valley, and Jarrod reveals to Brandi an alter ego known as Max Profit. Darrell is forced to attend the auction alone - can The Gambler win without his Side Bet? Meanwhile Rene's locker buying addiction results in a close encounter with death.
120	16	"Ghosts Don't Need Money"	Costa Mesa, CA	June 17, 2014	2.023
Casey attempts to keep a rein on Rene's spending habits; Darrell and Brandon use their intuition to soar above their competitors; Ivy tries to secretly learn Jarrod and Brandi's purchasing strategy.
121	17	"Pay The Dan"	Upland, CA and Costa Mesa, CA	June 24, 2014	2.005
The bargain hunters take a ride up to Upland, California where the auction takes place. Ivy searches for high-end lockers. Rene and Casey clash over purchases. Things get a little harry after Brandi and Jarrod spend $1,300 on a unit. Darrell plays old-fashioned pranks on his rivals using "every trick in the book".
122	18	"The Robot Cowboy"	Garden Grove, CA	July 1, 2014	1.646
The pressure is on for Darrell and Brandon to dial up some merchandise for their website. Ivy's exhaustion forces him to switch into robot mode, and Rene dresses for success. Meanwhile Jarrod and Brandi have a "nice" new strategy...but will it work?
123	19	"It's Bring Your Kids To Work Day"	Norwalk, CA	July 8, 2014	2.012
It's spring break and Jarrod and Brandi decide to bring their kids to the auction. Will they be a help or a hindrance? Rene and Casey are back working as a team. Ivy hopes to stock up for his upcoming store auction and Darrell puts his "Gambler" nickname to the ultimate test.
124	20	"The Mom Factor"	Lancaster, CA	July 15, 2014	N/A
The bidders travel to Lancaster, CA once again to hopefully buy some quality units. Jarrod and Brandi are all about having fun as they try to dunk the competition with their $425 unit. Darrell and Brandon hope to be on par with a victory with a really cheap locker, while Casey tries her hand at bidding. Ivy transforms his store into an auction house, but will he flip a profit?
125	21	"The Man in Black is Back... In Black"	Huntington Beach, CA	August 12, 2014	N/A
Everyone is shocked to see Dave Hester return to the auctions with a vengeance, but Laura throws him out for disrespecting her. Darrell tries to get Brandon into "top-tip" shape, an injury forces Ivy to change up his game, and Jarrod and Brandi score a unit that leads to a wild ride. Dan Dotson is outta town.
126	22	"The Return of the Mogul's Return!"	Montclair, CA	August 12, 2014	N/A
At an auction in Montclair, Ivy rakes in the dollar bills while Darrell keeps things old school and finds something that will launch him to new heights. Brandi worries Jarrod's hangover will compromise get in the way of buying. And despite his fight with Laura, Dave just won't stay away and winds up hacking the competition. Dan Dotson is still outta town.
127	23	"Bunny Owns This Town"	Ramona, CA	August 19, 2014	N/A
The buyers rolled onto Ramona, California. Jarrod and Brandi are determined not to let Dave distract them from a good score while Darrell wants to find out more about the elusive Mogul. Dave shows up with even more bluster and Ivy uncovers a treasure that promises adventure on the high seas.
128	24	"Bowling for Brandi"	West Covina, CA	August 26, 2014	N/A
Darrell and Brandon are excited to return to West Covina as it is a hidden honeypot for the tank-topped duo. While it's off the beaten path, Jarrod and Brandi decide to follow Darrell's lead deep into the Inland Empire. Ivy makes the trek in search of low level merchandise and Dave has a first class find.
129	25	"Deep In The Heart of Upland"	Upland, CA	September 2, 2014	N/A
The buyers have a surprise visitor from the Lone Star State at an auction in Upland, CA. Jarrod and Brandi are determined to make big money from small finds. Darrell and Brandon discover a piece of history that takes them to the airwaves and Ivy's bad day ends with a bang. Mary Padian of Storage Wars: Texas appears in this episode.
130	26	"The Daneurysm"	Hemet, CA and Palm Springs, CA	September 8, 2014	N/A
Dan and Laura Dotson find themselves in a life or death crisis. Unaware, the buyers and Ron Scheenstra get down to business in Hemet, California. Ivy sorts through the competition, while Brandi has trouble just keeping Jarrod focused on buying. And Mary Padian encounters something that could be "a little" out of this world.
131	27	"The Education of Miss Profit"	Moreno Valley, CA	September 16, 2014	N/A
The buyers are back in Moreno Valley, California, where Darrell and Brandon discover the great taste of success. Mary Padian is looking for love... and nice units. And the sequel to Jarrod and Brandi's last trip to Moreno Valley, "The Adventures of Max Profit", quickly turns into "The Education of Miss Profit". Ivy lost his shoes.
132	28	"Bid Strong And Prosper"	Costa Mesa, CA	September 23, 2014	N/A
Dan Dotson returns to the auctions in Costa Mesa, where the buyers have their sights set on Dave Hester in his home turf. Darrell and Brandon take the auction over the top. And Jarrod and Brandi discover something that takes them to a place where no bidder has gone before.
133	29	"Hestered in the Highlands"	Murrieta, CA	September 30, 2014	N/A
The buyers head to the hills of Murietta for an auction that has tensions and prices running high. Dave angers Darrell so much that it leads to him doing something drastic. Ivy uses brains over brawn to score a locker while Jarrod and Brandi struggle to land a unit.
SP1	TBA	"Best Of: The Finds"	Compilation	June 24, 2014	1.775
During this special episode, the series takes a look back at some of the show's most memorable moments, including some of the greatest scores, the most disgusting finds, and a never-before-seen find where one of Jarrod's lockers was believed to contain a lethal weapon, but turned out to be a harmless battery charger.
SP2	TBA	"Best Of: The Blunders"	Compilation	July 1, 2014	1.476
During this special episode, the series takes a look back at the show's biggest mess-ups, including everything from bad finds, to locker avalanches, to speaking mishaps and a never-before-seen argument, regarding what happens when one steals Laura's catchphrase.
SP3	TBA	"Best of: The Strategies"	Compilation	July 8, 2014	1.668
During this special episode, the series takes a look back to see the greatest tactics, from the best bidding techniques, the best ways to distract the opponent and a never-before-seen moment where Darrell took a wrong turn on the way to appraise his fat-jiggler, but still had a good time!
SP4	TBA	"Best of: The Feuds"	Compilation	July 15, 2014	N/A
During this special episode, the series takes a look back at some of the show's greatest feuds and fights.
SP5	TBA	"Best Of: Jarrod and Brandi"	Compilation	August 19, 2014	N/A
SP6	TBA	"Best Of: Darrell and Brandon"	Compilation	August 26, 2014	N/A

== Episode statistics ==
Although revealed at the end of the episode, the totals are not always reflective and exact of the value of items in the lockers. In many cases, the values of items are estimates made on the spot by the cast members, and are not necessarily actual profits or losses. Some of the episodes were not aired in the order that they were filmed. Therefore, the * column in each season's episode list indicates the sequential order of that episode.

#	*	Title	Air date	Dave Hester		Jarrod Shultz/ Brandi Passante		Darrell and Brandon Sheets		Rene Nezhoda/ Casey Lloyd		Ivy Calvin		Mary Padian	
#	*	Title	Air date	Spent	Net profit/loss	Spent	Net profit/loss	Spent	Net profit/loss	Spent	Net profit/loss	Spent	Net profit/loss	Spent	Net profit/los
105	1	"Flight of the Gambler"	March 18, 2014	————	————	$3,700.00	-$3,750.00	$1,600.00	$650.00^{2}	N/A	-$300.00^{1}	$237.50	$1,132.50	————	————
106	2	"The Hills Have Buys"	March 18, 2014	————	————	N/A	N/A	$1,250.00	$3,230.00	$750.00	$300.00	$500.00	$440.00	————	————
107	3	"Nerds of the Round Table"	March 25, 2014	————	————	$1,000.00	$700.00	$500.00	$365.00	$1,300.00	$3,700.00	N/A	N/A	————	————
108	4	"Operation: Intimidation"	March 25, 2014	————	————	$4,400.00^{3}	-$460.00	$1,200.00	$11,030.00	N/A	N/A	$350.00	$2,650.00	————	————
109	5	"The Return of the King of Montebello"	April 1, 2014	————	————	$900.00	-$180.00	$2,800.00	$37,200.00	$1,125.00^{4}	-$345.00	N/A	N/A	————	————
110	6	"For A Good Time Call... Ivy"	April 1, 2014	————	————	$3,000.00	-$176.00	N/A	N/A	$1,300.00	$1,560.00	$275.00	$450.00	————	————
111	7	"LBC U LTR"	April 8, 2014	————	————	N/A	N/A	$225.00	$890.00	$725.00	$4,400.00	$150.00	$1,150.00	————	————
112	8	"Nuthin' But A 'G' Thang, Rene"	April 15, 2014	————	————	N/A	N/A	$300.00	$1,598.00^{5}	$2,300.00^{5}	-$1,330.00	$1,300.00	-$900.00	————	————
113	9	"Boom Goes The Dynamite?"	April 22, 2014	————	————	$1,300.00	-$1,200.00	$500.00	$2,440.00	$500.00	$890.00	N/A	N/A	————	————
114	10	"Zen Masters of the Universe"	April 29, 2014	————	————	N/A	N/A	$15,750.00	$75,250.00	$2,570.00^{6}	$3,840.00	$1,300.00	$1,155.00	————	————
115	11	"Darrell Sheets The Bed"	June 3, 2014	————	————	$700.00	$1,220.00	N/A	N/A	$975.00	$1,320.00	$1,100.00	$2,190.00	————	————
116	12	"The Donut Effect"	June 3, 2014	————	————	$1,875.00	$6,583.00^{7}	N/A	$150.00^{8}	$5,700.00	$4,150.00	N/A	N/A	————	————
117	13	"The Gutfather"	June 10, 2014	————	————	$2,200.00	$150.00	$1,075.00^{9}	$655.00	N/A	N/A	$1,600.00	$1,635.00	————	————
118	14	"Grin And Barry It"	June 10, 2014	————	————	$1,150.00	$950.00	N/A	N/A	$375.00	$6,025.00	$320.00	$1,605.00	————	————
119	15	"The Adventures of Max Profit"	June 17, 2014	————	————	$300.00	$1,740.00	$150.00	$3,248.00	$260.00	$455.00	N/A	N/A	————	————
120	16	"Ghosts Don't Need Money"	June 17, 2014	————	————	$1,300.00	$290.00	$550.00	$690.00	N/A	N/A	$125.00	$723.00	————	————
121	17	"Pay The Dan"	June 24, 2014	————	————	$875.00	$210.00	N/A	N/A	$300.00	$620.00	$450.00	$1,685.00	————	————
122	18	"The Robot Cowboy"	July 1, 2014	————	————	N/A	N/A	$300.00	$195.00	$2,650.00	-$800.00	$650.00	$469.00	————	————
123	19	"It's Bring Your Kids to Work Day"	July 8, 2014	————	————	$1,200.00	-$593.00	$1,100.00	$850.00	$750.00	-$490.00	N/A	N/A	————	————
124	20	"The Mom Factor"	July 15, 2014	————	————	$425.00	$1,405.00	$5.00	$285.00	N/A	N/A	$500.00	$3,378.00^{10}	————	————
125	21	"The Man in Black Is Back... in Black!"	August 12, 2014	N/A ^{11}	N/A ^{11}	$1,000.00^{11}	$6,640.00	N/A	N/A	See Notes		$300.00	$873.00	————	————
126	22	"The Return of the Mogul's Return!"	August 12, 2014	$450.00	$1,290.00	N/A	N/A	$800.00	$3,830.00	See Notes		$175.00	$5,270.00	————	————
127	23	"Bunny Owns This Town"	August 19, 2014	$225.00	$1,605.00	N/A	N/A	$800.00	$2,620.00	See Notes		$300.00	$1,326.00	————	————
128	24	"Bowling for Brandi"	August 26, 2014	$425.00	$3,430.00	$50.00	$1,350.00	N/A	N/A	See Notes		$75.00	$1,199.00	————	————
129	25	"Deep in the Heart of Upland"^{12}	September 2, 2014	See Notes ^{12}		$400.00	$10.00	$700.00	$750.00	See Notes		$475.00	$710.00	N/A	N/A
130	26	"The Daneurysm"^{13}	September 8, 2014	See Notes ^{13}		$1,250.00	$2,275.00	N/A	N/A	See Notes		$850.00	$138.00	$500.00	$1,700.00
131	27	"The Education of Miss Profit"^{14}	September 16, 2014	See Notes ^{14}		$550.00	$635.00	$90.00	$225.00	See Notes		N/A	N/A	$150.00	$1,010.00
132	28	"Bid Strong and Prosper"	September 23, 2014	N/A	N/A	$230.00	$4,215.00	$205.00	$890.00	See Notes		$650.00	$580.00	See Notes ^{15}	
133	29	"Hestered in the Highlands"	September 30, 2014	$1,600.00	$830.00	N/A	N/A	N/A	N/A	See Notes		$1,050.00	$2,050.00	See Notes ^{16}	
		Totals:		$2,700.00	$7,155.00	$30,580.00	$24,439.00	$30,250.00	$148,266.00	$21,590.00	$24,020.00	$13,032.50	$30,606.50	$650.00	$2,710.00

=== Notes ===
- ^{1} In "Flight of the Gambler", Jarrod and Brandi bought four lockers. Rene and Casey did not buy a locker, but lost money due to the price of gas and labor to bring the truck up from San Diego.
- ^{2} In "Flight of the Gambler", Darrell would have earned an extra $2,000 in profit from a model plane they found in their unit, but Brandon crashed the plane in a test flight, making it worthless.
- ^{3} In "Operation: Intimidation", Jarrod & Brandi spent $3,400 on the unit and an extra $1,000 to repair their truck after hitting a tree.
- ^{4} In "Return of the King of Montebello", Rene and Casey spent $725 on their locker and had to pay $400 more for hitting a fence in a previous episode. Rene could have earned an extra $300 for a dance pole in the unit, but decided to keep it.
- ^{5} In "Nuthin' But A 'G' Thang, Rene", Darrell won a coin flip from Rene for $1,000. This is reflected in Rene's spending and Darrell's profit.
- ^{6} In "Zen Masters Of The Universe", Rene and Casey bought three lockers.
- ^{7} In "The Donut Effect", Jarrod and Brandi bought two lockers and their profit represents the take from the fourth anniversary sale at their store, since almost nothing of value was in either unit.
- ^{8} In "The Donut Effect", Darrell and Brandon did not buy a locker but had previously purchased KISS masks appraised.
- ^{9} In "The Gutfather", Darrell and Brandon spent $700 on their locker and paid an additional $375 to have the pool table from the unit set up by professionals.
- ^{10} In "The Mom Factor", Ivy bought three lockers and his profit represents the take from the auction held at his store.
- ^{11} In "The Man in Black is Back... in Black!", Jarrod and Brandi bought three lockers. Dave Hester was kicked out of the auction before he could buy a locker.
- ^{12} In "Deep in the Heart of Upland", Dave Hester did not appear.
- ^{13} In "The Daneurysm", Ron Scheenstra fills in for Dan and Laura as auctioneer. Dave Hester did not appear in this episode.
- ^{14} In, "The Education of Miss Profit", Dave Hester did not appear.
- ^{15} In, "Bid Strong and Prosper", Mary Padian did not appear.
- ^{16} In, "Hestered in the Highlands", Mary Padian did not appear.
- Rene Nezhoda and Casey Lloyd did not appear in episodes 21-29.
