= Storage Wars season 4 =

Storage Wars
- Season 4

Release
- Original network: A&E
- Original release: March 18 – July 2, 2013

Season chronology
- ← Previous; Season 3 Next → Season 5

The fourth season of the reality television show, Storage Wars aired on A&E from April 16, 2013 to July 2, 2013. It consisted of 26 episodes, beginning with the episode "The Big Boy vs. The Heavyweight" and ending with the episode "Super Bros. Shuffle".

Following the departure of Dave Hester, numerous buyers were featured this season as there was no permanent personality for the fourth featured buyer spot. This is the final season to feature Barry Weiss.

All of the episodes this season were filmed at various self-storage facilities throughout Southern California, including Mini-U Storage, Storage Outlet and Extra Storage.

== Episode overview ==
No. overall	No. in season	Title	Location	Original release date	U.S. viewers (millions)
79	1	"The Big Boy vs. The Heavyweights"	La Habra, CA	March 18, 2013	unknown
The buyers go to La Habra, California for the first time ever. Darrell heats up the competition and buys a unit filled with tools for $2,600 and makes almost $10,000. Jarrod and Brandi sees a great amount of intrigue, and then gamble on a unit and buy it for $300 and come across some fancy watches. A new bidder named Ivy Calvin, known as the "King of Palmdale" comes to dominate the competition and buys a trio of lockers for $735 and triples his money. Barry spends $800 on a unit and finds an object having to do with golf, and actually makes money with it.
80	2	"The Kook, The Chief, His Son, and The Brothers"	Lake Elsinore, CA	March 18, 2013	unknown
All the bidders travel up to Lake Elsinore, California for the auction. Darrell and Brandon purchase a unit for $725 with much furniture and random collectibles, and find something astronomical that could be valuable. Barry brings Boston Joe that they buys a $500 unit containing many mystery boxes and ending for Skydive Elsinore. New bidder The Harris Brothers "The Kings of Swag", make an appearance (appeared earlier in "May the Vaults Be With You" when Barry wanted something appraised for Star Wars Jacket) and take a gamble and buy it for $45 and hoping to encounter something that's beyond cool. Jarrod and Brandi try to focus bidding on the units, and go home with nothing.
81	3	"Nobody's Vault But Mine"	Chatsworth, CA	March 25, 2013	unknown
The buyers travel to Chatsworth, California for an auction where 100 "vaults" (each "vault" consisting of a wooden crate containing -primarily household goods) will be sold to the highest bidder. Extra buyers descend to the auction and prepare for the long-drawn out battle. Some vaults were sold in groups; in those cases, the buyer(s) would pay "times the money" (e.g., if two vaults were sold at $200, the buyer would pay $400 total). Barry buys two vaults for $750 and wonders if his newly acquired antiques will bring him serious cash. Herb and Mike buy two vaults for $400 and find some crowns that they hope will give them a beautiful profit. Mark Balelo buys ten vaults for a total cost of $1,500 with household items and furniture, but is it good quality? Jarrod and Brandi, Ivy, and Darrell have purchased nothing and still have all their money in their pocket halfway into the sale.
82	4	"Still Nobody's Vault But Mine"	Chatsworth, CA	March 25, 2013	unknown
The intense 100-vault auction in Chatsworth, California continues into the night. Jarrod and Brandi buy five vaults for $1,125 with some furniture and find an expensive pair of chairs that could be worth more than they think. Darrell takes charge without Brandon and buys four vaults for $2,000 with good quality furniture. Ivy Calvin makes a $275 purchase on a vault, and finds obscure items to do with snakes. Barry buys the last vault of the auction for $120 and hopes it has some magic for a big payout crack with some nuts.
83	5	"Auctioning for Dummies"	Stanton, CA	April 16, 2013	3.01
Darrell hopes to score another major find as the bidders converge in Stanton, California. Darrell wins himself an $1,800 unit with many boxes and also much jewelry. Mark's new custom-made man purse is filled with cash, he buys three units for the total cost of $2,200. Nabila's $675 locker is fit for a dummy, literally. Barry Weiss makes a purchase of a $1,700 unit containing a large amount of car and motorcycle parts, and makes $10,000 off all the parts. Jarrod and Brandi fail to purchase a unit.
84	6	"Breathalyze This"	Huntington Beach, CA	April 16, 2013	3.01
The buyers return to Huntington Beach, California. Barry introduces kitsch king Charles Phoenix, an appraiser, to the joys of an auction. Barry goes crazy and buys two lockers for a total expense of $1,225 and doubles his money off both lockers combined. Jarrod travels solo and buys a unit for $1,600 containing household items, and ends up finding a high-end breathalyzer - that he hopes will cover the cost of the unit. Darrell loses his home-field advantage and goes home with nothing.
85	7	"All's Well That Urns Well"	Orange, CA and West Covina, CA	April 23, 2013	2.58
The bidders visit Orange, California for the auction. Brandi and Jarrod hope to be successful and earn a massive profit with their $275 unit. Ivy Calvin buys a unit for $250 and finds collectibles "in the garbage" that turn a reasonable amount of money for him. Barry attempts to revenge the other buyers by helping them spend their money, but fails on $150 locker that he didn't want to buy which contains much old office equipment. Darrell travels home without a unit despite the bad appearance of the units.
86	8	"The PA Stays in the Picture"	Rancho Cucamonga, CA	April 23, 2013	3.02
The bidders barge into the rich neighborhood of Rancho Cucamonga, California and hope for some bargains. Jarrod and Brandi spend $1,000 on a unit with some furniture and obtain a small set of tools - but will those tools earn them a big profit? Barry arrives late to the festivities, but still manages to purchase a unit for $600 with some old electronics. Mark Balelo buys a unit for $2,700, while being bid up by Jarrod, containing some printing equipment and hopes a large printer will earn him a large profit. Darrell saves his money for the next auction.
87	9	"A Time to Kiln"	San Jacinto, CA	April 29, 2013	2.41
The bidders travel to San Jacinto, California for the first time. Darrell buys a unit for $750 with many boxes, and finds a musical device and hopes to hear the sound of money. Jarrod and Brandi buy a unit filled with common household items for $2,400 and turns out to be bad luck. Barry makes a $925 purchase on a unit with much molding equipment and a few kilns. After both teams of Barry and the team of Jarrod and Brandi both need to make money for their units that didn't make them a lot of money, they realize the must team up in order to turn a profit. Nabila Haniss attempts to expand her territory too, but will it work?
88	10	"Like a Kung Pao Cowboy"	Montebello, CA	April 29, 2013	2.63
The buyers head back to Montebello, California were Darrell hit the jackpot with his art unit he bought earlier. Barry purchases a unit for $2,200 containing the remains of what appears to be a furniture store and actually does well. Mark Balelo buys a unit for $400 containing many boxes and finds some body-piercing equipment, used to (i.e.) pierce ears, nose, etc. Jarrod and Brandi go crazy and spend a little over $11,450 on four different units containing furniture and other miscellaneous items for their new store - they end up making double the money invested in their four lockers combined that they purchased. Darrell hopes to buy a unit and make a pile of money, but ends up going home empty handed. Note: Mark Balelo's final episode.
89	11	"Oysters on The Half Plate"	Long Beach, CA	May 6, 2013	2.35
The bidders look to strike it big in Long Beach, California and have some good luck. Brandi arrives to the auction alone and buys a unit for $1,900, and Jarrod shows up just in time to judge her buy, and hopes to find something profitable. Darrell and Brandon's $250 gamble could brew up a tidy profit. The Harris Brothers work on their bidding strategy, but get no lockers. Barry hopes to turn a bad $750 locker into big time gold, but will he succeed?
90	12	"The Monster Hash"	Costa Mesa, CA	May 6, 2013	2.35
New Auctioneers named Earl and Johan Graham visit the auction. Ivy Calvin battles Darrell on his home turf, when the buyers descend upon Costa Mesa, California. Darrell buys a unit for $500 containing many boxes and containers and encounters some expensive action figure. Ivy Calvin spends $400 and comes across a unique tool. Barry gets back in the produce business and purchases a unit for $800, while in a bidding war with Darrell, and finds some quality produce equipment that makes him money. Jarrod and Brandi do not buy a locker.
91	13	"Old Tricks, New Treats"	Inglewood, CA	May 14, 2013	2.37
The bidders look for bargains in Inglewood, California. A confident Barry rides in on his motorcycle and hopes to obtain a great unit. Jarrod and Brandi hope to trick the new buyers, they're successful and buy a two lockers for the total cost of $1,900 and have some treats. Ivy spends $200 on a unit with a few pieces of furniture and finds a giant seashell. Herb and Mike spends $350 on a mandolin unit and encounter a musical instrument that they hope to hear the sound of profit from. Darrell and Brandon do not show up to this auction.
92	14	"The Shrining"	El Monte, CA	May 14, 2013	2.64
The buyers visit El Monte, California. The Harris Brothers go into stealth mode and go home empty handed. Jarrod and Brandi feel charitable with their $230 locker they purchased, and do a good deed. Darrell hopes a big pole in his $150 unit will vault him to the top. Barry buys a $45 locker with many bags, and finds something that he could make money off of.
93	15	"Orange You Glad Dan Sold It Again?"	Burbank, CA and Riverside, CA	May 28, 2013	2.60
The buyers are in Burbank, California. A pair of new bidders named Rene and Casey beat Jarrod and Brandi to a packed locker that they really want, therefore they go home empty handed. Barry obtains a unit with a trunk for $1,500 and goes crazy when he buys it, and finds a trunk - and it gives him a reason to visit his cobbler. Herb and Mike walk away with Burbank auction both another auction in Riverside, purchase a unit for $575 in Riverside and meets a jerk...but will they end up crushing the competition? Meanwhile, Darrell and Brandon didn't go to either auction.
94	16	"Barry's Angels"	Torrance, CA	May 28, 2013	2.67
The buyers arrive in Torrance, California ready to bid. Barry and his Angels purchase a unit with for $1,125 thinking by the appearance of it - it is mystery looking because of the containers and boxes in it, he is visited by wrestling legend "Rowdy" Roddy Piper. Rene and Casey score a statue that could be worth thousands of dollars with their $725 unit. Darrell buys a locker with many containers and other miscellaneous items for $2,300 and finds some feline-related items and hopes to get some cash. Jarrod and Brandi end up getting nothing.
95	17	"The French Job"	Laguna Niguel, CA	June 4, 2013	2.59
The buyers attend an auction in Laguna Niguel, California; which has 5 units for sale. Barry brings along a french ally, he gets disqualified from the auction from touching something inside the unit. So Barry's French ally does the bidding for him and makes a safe bet and obtains a unit with a safe for $600, and only a safe. Jarrod and Brandi buy a unit for $650 with an array of mystery to it, and encounter some yo-yo's that could be worth lots. The Harris Brothers buy a unit for $170 that has very few items in it and hopes to turn their items into money, literally. Ivy Calvin gets a speeding ticket, but no units. Darrell and Brandon are not anywhere to be seen.
96	18	"That's My Jerry!"	Compton, CA	June 4, 2013	2.68
Many buyers come flying into Compton, California for the auction. Everyone hopes to obtain a good quality unit, and the auction heats up and the battles start immediately. Barry reunites with his friend Kenny and buys a unit for $825 and have some good times. Mike and Herb buy a locker for $101 containing some mystery tubs, and the manage to pull some money out of their unit. Jarrod gets a new nickname and obtains a unit for $850 with some furniture and does well. Ivy Calvin bids up the other buyers, and forgets to purchase a unit. Darrell and Brandon did not attend the auction.
97	19	"This Lamp's For You"	Orange, CA	June 11, 2013	2.52
Everyone is out on the hunt for money-making units while visit Orange, California. Barry brings along a butler and buys a $250 unit and finds nothing special, but instead something completely out of the ordinary. Darrell sets a record for the most money spent on a unit in the show's history, when he purchases a $13,500 unit with large amount of Hollywood and sports memorabilia and makes a massive profit. Jarrod and Brandi score a vintage lamp in their unit in their $50 unit.
98	20	"There's No Place Like Homeland"	Homeland, CA	June 11, 2013	2.83
The auction is held in Homeland, California. Jarrod and Brandi spend $1,000 on a unit with some common household items. Casey and Rene spend $700 on a little mystery unit and obtain a Wizard of Oz chess set which could earn them big bucks. Barry purchases a $2,900 locker on a bunch of miscellaneous items and hopes to break even. The Harris Brothers hope to obtain a very valuable object in a unit, if they get one. Darrell and Brandon did not attend this auction that was held.
99	21	"Total Wine Domination"	Mission Viejo, CA	June 18, 2013	2.32
The bidders peruse lockers in Mission Viejo, California. Jarrod and Brandi uncover an unusual piece of art in their $1,900 locker. Rene and Casey buy a $1,050 unit with some furniture and locate some vintage Wine bottles. Barry's accountant tries to keep him in check by not overspending, he buys an $1,150 unit with antiques and finds something out of the ordinary.
100	22	"The Storage Buyer in You"	Lancaster, CA	June 18, 2013	2.72
The bidders revisit Lancaster, California. Darrell battles Ivy on his turf. Ivy Calvin buys four lockers for the total cost of $1,460 and makes a decent amount of money. Barry purchases a unit for $3,350 containing much quality furniture and unexpectedly encounters some bowls that make an unusual sound, which he hopes bring him the sound of profit. Jarrod and Brandi buy a unit for $2,400 with a lot of boxes and containers and find some DJ equipment. Darrell spends time teaching Ivy a lesson on his home turf, but doesn't obtain a unit.
101	23	"Fear and Loathing in Placentia"	Placentia, CA	June 25, 2013	2.55
The bargain hunters travel to the city of Placentia, California. Jarrod and Brandi buy a $300 unit and their purchase tips the scales in their favor towards profit. Rene and Casey buy a load of luggage for $350 and do surprisingly well. Barry buys a unit full and packed with boxes for $1,000 and won a bidding war against Rene and finds out there is nothing special in any of the boxes. Darrell scores what he thinks is dental equipment in his $575 locker, but later finds out it's something different.
102	24	"Barry Doubtfire"	Stanton, CA	June 25, 2013	2.82
The buyers visit Stanton, California looking for bargains. Barry has an elaborate scheme to disguise himself as an old lady, and earns himself a $950 unit filled with office furniture and other items and hopes to not lose money. Darrell is banned from an auction on one particular unit, but the unit doesn't get sold to anyone anyway because nobody liked it and nobody was bidding. Ivy Calvin lands a snow cone machine in his $100 unit. Jarrod and Brandi, as well as Darrell go home with nothing for the day.
103	25	"Battle of the Brows"	Moreno Valley, CA	July 2, 2013	2.68
The buyers head to Moreno Valley, California where the bidding strategies and techniques erupt between Darrell and Rene. Barry buys a unit full of boxes for $300 while being bid up by Darrell and finds some old super hero buttons that he is uncertain of the profit of them. Rene and Casey purchase a unit with furniture for $450 and locate Indian instruments and hope to hear the sound of profit. Jarrod and Brandi obtain a unit for $950 containing a device having to do with Rolex watches. Darrell tries to play nice, but goes home without a unit.
104	26	"Super Bros. Shuffle"	Costa Mesa, CA	July 2, 2013	2.80
The bidders head to Costa Mesa, California where the buyers bid on some of the biggest and best rooms. Darrell and Brandon purchases a unit for $950 which he thinks is "money making" and does great, and does better once he finds some Mario memorabilia. However, Darrell be a rockstar. Brandi and Jarrod buy a unit for $2,300 with some furniture and collectibles and barely break even with their purchase. Barry spends $2,450 on a locker filled with antique furniture and finds a shuffle board. Barry later bets on his own profit when he gets his shuffleboard game board appraised, and wins against himself. Ivy Calvin didn't have enough cash with him to buy the units at the auction. This was the last episode to use 2008 - 2013 A&E Network tagline,"Real Life.Drama". This was also the final episode for Barry Weiss.

== Episode statistics ==
Although revealed at the end of the episode, the totals are not always reflective and exact of the value of items in the lockers. In many cases, the values of items are estimates made on the spot by the cast members, and are not necessarily actual profits or losses. Some of the episodes were not aired in the order that they were filmed. Therefore, the * column in each season's episode list indicates the sequential order of that episode.

=== Main buyers episode statistics ===
#	*	Title	Air date	Jarrod Shultz/ Brandi Passante		Darrell Sheets/ Brandon Sheets		Barry Weiss	
#	*	Title	Air date	Spent	Net profit/loss	Spent	Net profit/loss	Spent	Net profit/loss
79	1	"The Big Boys vs. The Heavyweights"	March 18, 2013	$300.00	$1,370.00	$2,600.00	$7,360.00	$800.00	$1,125.00
80	2	"The Kook, The Chief, His Son, and The Brothers"	March 18, 2013	N/A	N/A	$725.00	$4,025.00	$500.00	-$480.00
81	3	"Nobody's Vault but Mine"	March 25, 2013	N/A	N/A	N/A	N/A	$750.00	$2,200.00
82	4	"Still Nobody's Vault but Mine"	March 25, 2013	$1,125.00	$3,975.00	$2,000.00	$1,175.00	$120.00	$230.00
83	5	"Auctioning for Dummies"	April 16, 2013	N/A	N/A	$1,800.00	$1,995.00	$1,700.00	$8,300.00
84	6	"Breathalyze This"	April 16, 2013	$1,600.00^{1}	$160.00	N/A	N/A	$1,225.00	$1,363.00
85	7	"All's Well That Urns Well"	April 23, 2013	$275.00	$1,325.00	N/A	N/A	$150.00	$221.00
86	8	"The PA Stays in the Picture"	April 23, 2013	$1,000.00	-$230.00	N/A	N/A	$600.00	$50.00
87	9	"A Time to Kiln"	April 30, 2013	$2,400.00^{2}	$1,065.00	$750.00	$1,100.00	$925.00	$2,275.00
88	10	"Like a Kung Pao Cowboy"	April 30, 2013	$11,450.00	$14,450.00	N/A	N/A	$2,200.00	$4,316.00
89	11	"Oysters on the Half Plate"	May 7, 2013	$1,900.00^{3}	$5,955.00	$250.00	$455.00	$750.00	-$90.00
90	12	"The Monster Hash"	May 7, 2013	N/A	N/A	$500.00	$800.00	$800.00	$1,190.00
91	13	"Old Tricks, New Treats"	May 14, 2013	$1,900.00	$2,600.00	————	————	N/A	N/A
92	14	"The Shrining"	May 14, 2013	$230.00	$67.00^{4}	$150.00	$2,190.00	$45.00	$705.00
93	15	"Orange You Glad Dan Sold It Again?"	May 28, 2013	N/A	N/A	————	————	$1,500.00	-$443.00
94	16	"Barry's Angels"	May 28, 2013	N/A	N/A	$2,300.00	$320.00	$1,125.00	-$105.00
95	17	"The French Job"	June 4, 2013	$650.00	$1,750.00	————	————	$600.00	-$600.00
96	18	"That's My Jerry!"	June 4, 2013	$850.00	$1,110.00	————	————	$825.00	-$160.00
97	19	"This Lamp's for You"	June 11, 2013	$50.00	$1,965.00	$13,500.00	$26,775.00	$250.00	$4,905.00
98	20	"There's No Place Like Homeland"	June 11, 2013	$1,000.00	$608.00	————	————	$2,900.00	-$650.00
99	21	"Total Wine Domination"	June 18, 2013	$1,900.00	$5,725.00	————	————	$1,150.00	$300.00
100	22	"The Storage Buyer in You"	June 18, 2013	$2,400.00	$2,880.00	N/A	N/A	$3,350.00	$1,955.00
101	23	"Fear and Loathing in Placentia"	June 25, 2013	$300.00	$590.00	$575.00	$1,525.00	$1,000.00	-$900.00
102	24	"Barry Doubtfire"	June 25, 2013	N/A	N/A	N/A	N/A	$950.00	-$695.00
103	25	"Battle of the Brows"	July 2, 2013	$950.00	$2,854.00	N/A	N/A	$300.00	$3,802.00
104	26	"Super Bros. Shuffle"	July 2, 2013	$2,300.00	$210.00	$950.00	$2,095.00	$2,450.00	-$1,070.00^{5}
		Totals:		$32,580.00	$48,429.00	$26,100.00	$49,815.00	$26,965.00	$27,744.00

==== Notes ====
- ^{1} Jarrod attended this auction alone.
- ^{2} Barry teams up with Jarrod and Brandi to turn a profit.
- ^{3} Brandi attended this auction alone.
- ^{4} Jarrod and Brandi donated their items appraised at $400 from their unit for a good cause.
- ^{5} Barry would have made a profit on this unit, but fell in the red when he offered all of his friends them $100 each if he could hit the "10" on his first shot on his assembled shuffleboard, which he did, thus costing him his potential profit.

=== Frequent buyers episode statistics ===
There were many frequent buyers over the course of the season. These are their results. Key: - didn't appear in episode.

#	*	Title	Air date	Ivy Calvin		Rene Nezhoda & Casey Lloyd		Herb Brown & Mike Karlinger		The Harris Brothers (Mark & Matt)		Nabila Haniss		Mark Balelo	
#	*	Title	Air date	Spent	Net profit/loss	Spent	Net profit/loss	Spent	Net profit/loss	Spent	Net profit/loss	Spent	Net profit/loss	Spent	Net profit/loss
79	1	"The Big Boy vs. The Heavyweights"	March 18, 2013	$735.00	$2,225.00	----	----	----	----	----	----	----	----	----	----
80	2	"The Kook, The Chief, His Son, and The Brothers"	March 18, 2013	----	----	----	----	----	----	$45.00	$855.00	----	----	----	----
81	3	"Nobody's Vault but Mine"	March 25, 2013	----	----	----	----	$400.00	$790.00	----	----	----	----	$1,500.00	-$700.00
82	4	"Still Nobody's Vault but Mine"	March 18, 2013	$275.00	$480.00	----	----	----	----	----	----	----	----	----	----
83	5	"Auctioning for Dummies"	April 16, 2013	----	----	----	----	----	----	----	----	$675.00	-$50.00	$2,200.00	N/A^{1}
84	6	"Breathalyze This"	April 16, 2013	----	----	----	----	----	----	----	----	----	----	----	----
85	7	"All's Well That Urns Well"	April 23, 2013	$250.00	$530.00	----	----	----	----	----	----	----	----	----	----
86	8	"The PA Stays in the Picture"	April 23, 2013	----	----	----	----	----	----	----	----	----	----	$2,700.00	-$1,450.00
87	9	"A Time to Kiln"	April 30, 2013	----	----	----	----	----	----	----	----	N/A	N/A	----	----
88	10	"Like a Kung Pao Cowboy"	April 30, 2013	----	----	----	----	----	----	----	----	----	----	$400.00	$1,560.00
89	11	"Oysters on the Half Plate"	May 7, 2013	----	----	----	----	----	----	N/A	N/A	----	----	----	----
90	12	"The Monster Hash"	May 7, 2013	$400.00	$1,485.00	----	----	----	----	----	----	----	----	----	----
91	13	"Old Tricks, New Treats"	May 14, 2013	$200.00	$271.00	----	----	$350.00	$2,650.00	----	----	----	----	----	----
92	14	"The Shrining"	May 14, 2013	----	----	----	----	----	----	N/A	N/A	----	----	----	----
93	15	"Orange You Glad Dan Sold It Again?"	May 28, 2013	----	----	$4,000.00	$910.00	$575.00	$1,125.00	----	----	----	----	----	----
94	16	"Barry's Angels"	May 28, 2013	----	----	$725.00	$775.00	----	----	----	----	----	----	----	----
95	17	"The French Job"	June 4, 2013	N/A	-$300.00^{2}	----	----	----	----	$170.00	$0.00	----	----	----	----
96	18	"That's My Jerry!"	June 4, 2013	N/A	N/A	----	----	$101.00	$429.00	----	----	----	----	----	----
97	19	"This Lamp's for You"	June 11, 2013	----	----	----	----	----	----	----	----	----	----	----	----
98	20	"There's No Place Like Homeland"	June 11, 2013	----	----	$700.00	$3,685.00	----	----	N/A	N/A	----	----	----	----
99	21	"Total Wine Domination"	June 18, 2013	----	----	$1,050.00	$1,150.00	----	----	N/A	N/A	----	----	----	----
100	22	"The Storage Buyer in You"	June 18, 2013	$1,460.00	$490.00	----	----	----	----	----	----	----	----	----	----
101	23	"Fear and Loathing in Placentia"	June 25, 2013	----	----	$350.00	$1,210.00	----	----	----	----	----	----	----	----
102	24	"Barry Doubtfire"	June 25, 2013	$100.00	$1,815.00	----	----	----	----	----	----	----	----	----	----
103	25	"Battle of the Brows"	July 2, 2013	----	----	$450.00	$1,260.00	----	----	----	----	----	----	----	----
104	26	"Super Bros. Shuffle"	July 2, 2013	N/A	N/A	----	----	----	----	----	----	----	----	----	----
		Totals:		$3,420.00	$6,996.00	$7,275.00	$8,990.00	$1,426.00	$4,994.00	$215.00	$855.00	675.00	-$50.00	$6,800.00	-$590.00

==== Notes ====
- ^{1} Mark bought three units for the total price of $2,200. It was not said or revealed at the end of the episode how much profit he made.
- ^{2} Even though Ivy Calvin didn't buy any units, he lost $300 because of a ticket for using his cell phone during driving.

==== Other Notes ====
- In "The Big Boys vs. The Heavyweights", Ivy Calvin spent $735 on three lockers and made a profit of $2,225.
- In "The Chief, The Kook, His Son and The Brothers", The Harris Brothers spent $45 and made a profit of $855.
- In "Nobody's Vault But Mine", Herb and Mike spent $400 and made a profit of $790. Mark Balelo spent $1,500 and lost $700.
- In "Still Nobody's Vault But Mine", Ivy Calvin spent $275 and made a profit of $480.
