= Storage Wars season 2 =

Storage Wars
- Season 2

Release
- Original network: A&E
- Original release: July 20, 2011 – March 4, 2012

Season chronology
- ← Previous; Season 1 Next → Season 3

The second season of the reality television show Storage Wars aired on A&E from July 20, 2011, to March 4, 2012. It consisted of 33 episodes, beginning with the episode "Hang Em' High Desert" and ending with the episode "Highland Anxiety".

All of the episodes this season were filmed at various self-storage facilities throughout Southern California, including Mini-U Storage, Storage Outlet and Extra Storage.

== Episode overview ==
No. overall	No. in season	Title	Location	Original release date
20	1	"Hang 'Em High Desert"	Victorville, CA	July 20, 2011
The buyers revisit the place where for some, their first ever auction took place in Victorville, California. Barry spends $1,100 on a musician's unit, finding a collection of guitar picks and a Bob Marley poster but he soon uncovers a collection of old antique guitars which he takes to Aerosmith's Brad Whitford for an appraisal. Dave spends $2,750 on a household unit which contains an antique pedal car. Darrell finds an old antique skull clock in his $1,150 unit – but is the payout going to be satisfying? And despite walking way with no unit, Jarrod and Brandi bag $100 from Darrell in a coin toss.
21	2	"Buyers on the Storm"	Whittier, CA	July 20, 2011
The buyers revisit Whittier, California. Dave attempts to stake his place in the business by spending $1,350 on a unit packed full of used and new vending machines and his $27,000 pay-off secures him a nice little vacation in Alaska and a pair of new pets. Jarrod spends $1,800 on a unit packed full of classic antiques, and although he doubles his money, his collection of antique cameras fail to live up to his expectations. Barry spends $450 on a unit containing some antique western memorabilia and Darrell heads home without a unit.
22	3	"Pay the Lady"	Riverside, CA	July 27, 2011
The buyers are in Riverside, California. Auctioneer Dan Dotson calls in sick, so his wife Laura takes the reins. Barry spends $225 on a unit containing a top-of-the-range massage chair and a collection of antique boxing gloves but do they hold as much worth as he expects? Jarrod and Brandi spend $200 on a unit containing an old gangster picture which they intend to put in their own living room, however, they come across the remains of an old billboard and the dollar signs begin to rack up. Dave spends $1,500 on a unit packed full of electronics, and Darrell's son Brandon uncovers a classic movie prop in their $145 unit that could be worth something.
23	4	"Santa Ana Street Fight"	Santa Ana, CA	July 27, 2011
The buyers are que to Santa Ana, California. Jarrod and Brandi spend $2,350 on the ultimate guy's unit, discovering a collection of sports equipment, an old piano and a collection of antique furniture. Darrell spends $275 on a small unit containing a couple of sealed boxes - and comes across a classic ice cream cooler that is worth in the region of $3,000. Dave spends $345 on a unit containing a selection of antique golf clubs, and despite not making a massive profit, still manages to earn a tidy sum. After failing to win a unit, Barry vows to buy a flashlight for the next set of auctions.
24	5	"Unclaimed Baggage"	Costa Mesa, CA	August 3, 2011
The cracked dawn in Costa Mesa, California. When Dave's estranged brother-in-law surfaces, he challenges him on a unit that everybody else thinks is filled with junk. However, his $1,700 investment leads him to a collection of rare rock 'n' roll posters, some of which could be worth more than $500 a piece. Meanwhile, Barry uncovers a wooden rendering of a head in his $1,525 unit, which turns out to be a rare 20th century sculpture worth $6,000. But does he have the heart to sell it? Darrell's $650 investment in a unit containing a century-old slide projector leaves him $400 out of pocket, and Jarrod and Brandi leave without a unit.
25	6	"Enemy of the Enemy"	Mission Hills, CA	August 3, 2011
A mystery bidder, Mark Balelo, aims to dominate the competition in Mission Hills, buying more than half of the twelve units that are up for sale in the auction. Everybody knows they are going to have to overpay to get what they want - but Dave is prepared to be pushed to the limit in a duel with his new nemesis. Dave's $9,000 investment on a collection of boxes turns out to be a unit full of lighting equipment, that could yield a $30,000 reward, Barry's $1,500 unit containing an antique peep show turns out to be worth a $7,000 profit, and Jarrod and Brandi outbid Darrell on a unit for $2,800 and end up facing a $2,100 loss when they discover that the Louis Vuitton purse they bid for is a fake trip to Knott's Berry Farm. Darrell leaves empty handed because of the prices of the units being to high.
26	7	"Fire in the Hole"	Mission Hills, CA	August 10, 2011
The buyers are fired to Mission Hills, California once again. Mark Balelo is back, along with his man-purse full of cash. Barry spends $900 on a unit with a mysterious hole in the wall - and despite it being totally bare, his find of an antique pool cue holder could still rake him in a nice $3,500 profit. Dave goes toe to toe again with his nemesis on a collection of equipment from a physical rehab center, and his $1,400 investment could soon be holding a $3,000 payout. While Darrell finds it hard just to stay in the ring, Jarrod pulls an old trick from Brandi and sneaks in a winning bid - only for his $1,300 unit to contain a collection of worthless fire equipment.
27	8	"San Burrito"	San Bernardino, CA	August 10, 2011
The buyers visit to San Bernardino, California. With Dave away on business, Darrell expects a peaceful day at the auctions. But when feared buyer Mark Balelo arrives and starts to flash his wad of cash, Darrell realizes that the auctions will be tainted by an expensive cloud. Balelo spends $925 on a unit packed full of clothes and household goods, and believes he has hit the jackpot when supposedly finds a $13,000 NES Nintendo System - but soon finds Darrell laughing in his face when it is valued at $10. Jarrod and Brandi spends $300 on a unit, expecting to barely double his money - but a pair of small singing bird boxes brighten up his day with a $7,000 payout. Barry brings a good luck charm with him to the auctions, but his $160 investment failed to yield a tasty reward. Darrell has a case of bidder indecision, leaving him without a unit.
28	9	"Tanks for the Memories"	Huntington Beach, CA	August 17, 2011
The bidders are come to Huntington Beach, California. When he arrives with his usual cockiness and attitude, Darrell and Jarrod decide to hatch a plan to keep Dave out of the game once and for all. Noticing an antique jewellery box that they know Dave desperately wants, Brandi and Jarrod spend $2,700. But is there something else that could result in a massive payout? Darrell spends $575 on a unit containing a collection of classic fishing rods, and Barry believes he has hit the jackpot when his $425 unit uncovers a collection of antique World War Two memorabilia. But is it enough to satisfy Barry's need for profit?
29	10	"Land of the Loss"	Santa Ana, CA	August 17, 2011
Returning to Santa Ana for a second set of auctions, Jarrod and Brandi spend $1,600 on a unit to stop Dave from buying it. They soon come across a collection of old roller skates, but will they be enough to make a profit? Barry spends $375 on a unit when he is intrigued by a pair of horns - and comes across an old organ worth $1,000. However, his kind generosity leaves him out of pocket. Darrell spends $1,550 on a unit containing a collection of old boy scout memorabilia - but his hopes of making a profit rest in the balance of a coin toss. Dave proves that sometimes not making a deal is what makes good common sense.
30	11	"Almost the Greatest Show on Earth"	Irvine, CA	August 31, 2011
The buyers make their way up to Irvine, California. Tensions finally boil over between Dave and Jarrod, erupting in a verbal spat between the pair. Dave's anger at everyone assuming he is broke leads him to buying an $8,000 unit packed full of motor parts - but he soon begins to believe that his retirement is just around the corner when he finds a Stradivarius Violin. But is it a fake? Jarrod and Brandi spend $1,700 on a unit that turns out to be nothing more than a dud, and Barry heads to a circus memorabilia collector when he comes across a collection of old circus banners that could earn him a payout of more than $3,000.
SP1	TBA	"Unlocked: Buy Low"	Las Vegas, NV	August 31, 2011
Hosted by the show's executive producer Thom Beers, the group meet at the abandoned Sahara Hotel and Casino in Las Vegas to relive the best bidding wars, hash out personal conflicts, and reveal some of the secrets behind their success, or lack of it. How did Dan get into the auction business? What do they think of new rival, Mark Balelo? Why does everyone hate Dave? What's the reasoning behind Barry's hi-jinx? Dan, Laura, Dave, Darrell, Barry, Jarrod and Brandi will be challenged with play-along segments that will test their collectibles knowledge and auction acumen. Special guests will join the cast for this contentious round-table discussion, as well as a video tease and surprise visit from the new cast of Storage Wars: Texas and Storage Wars: New York.
31	12	"Bowling for Dollars"	Upland, CA	September 7, 2011
The buyers are upscale in Upland. Barry spends $700 on a unit, and is surprised not to uncover anything of value. However, will a small cuckoo clock prove to be the winner he is looking for? Dave spends $4,000 on a unit packed full of jewellery and jewellery display cabinets - but also finds a rare collection of art and a safe packed with $2,200 in one hundred dollar bills. Jarrod and Brandi cash in on their $750 unit with a collection of old bowling memorabilia, as well as collection of 19th century furniture. Struggling with a divorce and a custody battle over his children, Darrell gets shut out all together.
32	13	"Get Him To The Mayan"	Laguna Niguel, CA	September 7, 2011
The buyers are straight in Laguna Niguel. Jarrod and Brandi spend $800 on a furniture unit, which Dave makes them overpay for, only to uncover a piece of rare depression era art - a medicine cabinet. Barry finds a collection of Mayan figures in his $600 unit, but are they enough to secure him even breaking even? Meanwhile, Darrell spends $2,300 to prove to Dave that he's not 'hibernating' - and ends up uncovering a rare Wells and Fargo stagecoach gun. But its authenticity turns out to be anything but a foregone conclusion - so will it be the $5,000 payout he was hoping for? Dave is surprised to be shut out by the other buyers, and walks away empty handed.
33	14	"Fu Dog Day Afternoon"	Laguna Hills, CA	September 14, 2011
In this upscale retirement community in Laguna Hills, Dave spends $35 on a dirty old furniture unit which nobody else will touch. But a rare Fu Dog jade statue that he discovers in the back of the unit soon points him in the direction of Chinatown - and a $2,000 payout. Jarrod and Brandi take a trip down memory lane, walking away without a unit, Darrell finds his rhythm in his $2,100 unit, uncovering a collection of rare mint-in-box 70's sound equipment, and Barry uncovers a vintage 1950's television in his $500 unit - and despite having it made into a $6,000 diorama, makes a loss when he decides to keep hold of it.
SP2	TBA	"Unlocked: Sell High"	Las Vegas, NV	September 14, 2011
In this second hour of Unlocked, the cast reconvenes to dig through some of the trash and treasure of season 1. Video highlights recap some of their strangest and most disgusting finds, reveal their personal strategies, and most lucrative scores. How does Darrell make his money and where does his wealth of knowledge come from? Who spent and made the most money this season? Can Jarrod and Brandi ever reach Dave's level of success? How has the popularity of the show affected the business? Professional poker player and world champion, Phil Hellmuth, joins the table to see if he can spot their tells, and a surprise guest shares a story about a huge celebrity locker score.
34	15	"I'm The New Mogul"	Downtown Los Angeles, CA	October 19, 2011
The buyers visit a vault auction in downtown LA, where nine crates owned by the same person go up for sale. Barry spends $700 on the owner's personal unit, in which he finds a work-out gym machine that could net him a tidy profit - if he sells to the right buyer. Dave discovers that the other eight crates contain parts of an electrical lighting system - and spends $1,825 attempting to get all of them. Darrell, however, manages to steal the most important crate from him - and it's going to cost Dave if he wants the parts he needs. Meanwhile, Jarrod and Brandi spend $800 on a pallet of mystery boxes, only to find a collection of rare signed artwork.
35	16	"Driving Miss Barry"	Westminster, CA	November 15, 2011
The buyers are tracked in Westminster. Brandi goes rogue and spends $6,750 on a unit filled with quad bikes in a bidding war with Dave. However, she soon manages to turn a nice little tidy profit of $5,350, much to Jarrod's dismay. Barry spends on $700 on a unit and finds an antique medical device, and takes off with his mother to get it appraised. However, its real value may not be revealed if he doesn't arrive on time. While Darrell walks away with nothing, Dave finds a collection of classic car parts in his $1,600 unit.
36	17	"Winner Winner Chicken Dinner"	Ontario, CA	November 15, 2011
The buyers are burst to Ontario, California. Darrell seizes the chance to educate Brandon at the next level of auction buying. When four units owned by the same tenant go up for sale, Jarrod and Brandi decide to bid on all of them, as each contains a select part of a designer furniture set. But Darrell is ready to prove his worth at Jarrod and Brandi's expense - but will their $2,725 collection still earn them a tidy payout? Meanwhile, Darrell finds an antique hearing tester that could be worth $500, and Barry takes a chance on a locker in which he discovers a collection of chicken eyeglasses. Meanwhile, Dave is nowhere to be seen.
37	18	"Auction Sesame"	Azusa, CA	November 22, 2011
The buyers lettered community in Azusa, California. Barry is surprised when his $100 throw on a dirty old unit is the winning bid, and so in order to save him time and money, he sells it to Darrell for half the price. Darrell finds a nice collectable telescope amongst a collection of old clothes - and he soon begins to make Barry wish he had never given up the unit in the first place. Jarrod and Brandi continue their journey of quality over quantity, spending $200 on a quarter-full unit - but will a pane of stained glass prove to be the big payout they are looking for? Barry starts to wonder whether he can pull a rabbit out of his hat, when he uncovers an old magic box in his $1,000 unit. Once Again, Dave is nowhere to be seen.
38	19	"Stairway To Hemet"	Hemet, CA	November 22, 2011
The buyers are Los Angeles suburb of Hemet, California. In an attempt to prevent him shattering everyone else's nerves, Barry tries to kill Dave's "YUUUP" with kindness by buying him a hat with "Yuup" written on the front of it. Jarrod and Brandi make their mark on the competition, spending $1,900 on a unit in which they find a tattoo making kit, which they take to get appraised. Darrell arrives to the auction late after getting lost, but still ends up with a $2,900 unit. Dave sails away with what he is hoping is one of his biggest paydays ever, but is his $3,800 investment going to take him as far as he expects?
39	20	"Scoot-A-Toot, Toot"	Long Beach, CA	November 29, 2011
Darrell finally gets some exercise in Long Beach, when he finds a 'fat jigger' in his $850 unit, which turns out to be worth a good $300 profit. Barry comes across a toy car in his $1,000 unit that turns out to be a tether car, and his to his surprise, is valued in the range of $7,000. Dave goes all out for a unit that hasn't been opened in 20 years - but is it just full of dust, or will his $2,500 investment rake in a nice little profit? Jarrod and Brandi walk away without a unit - and reveal that in all their years of auction buying, have never managed to scoop a unit at the Long Beach facility.
40	21	"The Empire Strikes Out"	Ontario, CA	November 29, 2011
The buyers are against in Ontario, California. In an attempt to silence Dave, Jarrod and Brandi reverts to his previous ways, paying by $3,000 for a collection of toys that make it hard for him to break even. Barry has a brush with his own mortality when his $1,550 unit comes crashing down on him - but the discovery of a rare crystal head statue could replace his amnesia with dollar signs in a matter of minutes. Darrell has a brush with "The Man", but still manages to pocket double his money on his $825 furniture unit. Once again, Dave walks away empty handed.
41	22	"Make It Rain, Girl"	Simi Valley, CA	December 6, 2011
The buyers cracked in Simi Valley, California. Jarrod and Brandi believe that they have hit the jackpot when they find two safes stashed full to the brim with antique coins in their $2,200 locker. Could this be the first time that Jarrod has ever found the treasure he is looking for in a safe? Darrell finds a collection of rare cigar memorabilia in his $2,500 unit, and discovers that his return could easily double his profits, and Dave's $750 unit could turn into a $20,000 payout when he finds a rare snuff box - but his dreams are soon shattered into pieces when he drops it on the way to get it appraised. Barry walks away without a unit.
42	23	"Smoke 'Em If You Find 'Em"	Newport Beach, CA	December 13, 2011
A heavy hitter who has a long history with Dave arrives in Newport Beach California. Dave's twenty-one-year partner, Nabila Hanniss, drops by to bid. Darrell informs Jarrod and Brandi that Nabila is best known for having purchased a storage unit containing items owned by Paris Hilton, and that if she wants a unit, she is going to get it. Sick and tired of Dave's Yupp's, Barry uses a whistle to bid - and it nets him a nice $1,600 unit containing an antique ivory Chinese medicine device - and so a visit to the doctor M.D. is soon prescribed. Both Darrell and son Brandon and Dave walk away without a unit, while Nabila to double her buck on her $450 furniture unit, and Jarrod and Brandi to pocket a $5,400 profit on some "very interesting" antique cigarette cases.
43	24	"The Drone Wars"	Gardena, CA	December 20, 2011
In an attempt to get an edge on the crowd in Gardena, Barry attempts to use a mini helicopter mounted with a video camera to get a unique look inside a unit, however, it leads to him being disqualified from bidding on the unit - and missing out on a big payout. He manages to win another $1,650 unit, in which he finds a rare 20th century cabinet. Dave's rival Nabila is back, and in the midst of the anarchy, he misses out on a unit full of construction equipment, which Darrell spends $7,000 on while getting bid up by Dave - only to be facing an $18,000 payout in profit. Jarrod and Brandi get in the game by grabbing a sportsman's locker for $3,400 - but will their collection of antique bows quite hit the target?
44	25	"Brandi's First Time"	Santa Ana, CA	January 3, 2012
In Santa Ana, California. In a bidding war against Darrell, Dave manages to land himself a $2,300 unit that Darrell dropped on him that he is not sure will make him any money. When he finds some vintage gaming machines, an appraisal only proves to be more bad news. Darrell scores big with his $3,350 unit when he uncovers a collection of vintage coca-cola bottles and other memorabilia. Meanwhile, Brandi arrives at the auction alone, with Jarrod supervising the expansion of their thrift store. Spending $2,600 in a bidding war with Dave, will she find the collectable she is looking for? Meanwhile, Barry walks away without a unit.
45	26	"Hooray For Holly-Weird"	North Hollywood, CA	January 3, 2012
The buyers are coming in North Hollywood. While Jarrod and Brandi are excited at the grand re-opening of their store, Jarrod soon bursts the bubble by spending $1,250 on a unit packed full of old tatty clothes - and losing $975 in the process. Barry finds an old top hat in his $2,000 unit, but is it enough to stretch to a profit? Meanwhile, Dave hits the big time with a unit packed full to the brim with books - and soon finds himself reveling in a $14,000 profit. Darrell walks away without a unit.
46	27	"Don't Bid So Close To Me"	Rancho Cucamonga, CA	January 10, 2012
The buyers are in Rancho Cucamonga, California located near historic Route 66. Dave wins unit full of household items for $3,500 and soon finds himself making a $2,000 profit to fit his ego. Jarrod and Brandi find a 1973 prototype survival support device that was to be used by sailors during a fire - and it makes them a tidy $900. Barry wins a unit just to get his hands on a Ludwig drum kit, which he has Stewart Copeland sign on the drums for him to increase the value. Darrell walks away without a unit once again.
47	28	"Not Your Average Bear"	Lancaster, CA	January 10, 2012
The buyers are bargains in Lancaster, California. Barry's latest attempt to get an edge on the crowd is to offer the entire crowd coffee and doughnuts. However, his plan works a treat when he spends $2.50 on a unit that turns out to be worth $2,000, with a collection of fly bottles. Jarrod and Brandi don't turn up to the auction, while Dave goes home empty-handed. Darrell spends $1,900 on a unit full of household items, and comes across a Steiff bear. Nabila spends $500 on a unit containing a collection of coins and currency, and despite believing she has hit the jackpot, several of the silver coins turn out to be counterfeit.
48	29	"Hook, Line and Sucker"	Inglewood, CA	January 17, 2012
The buyers are in Inglewood. Barry spends $320 on an ugly unit, and discovers a collection of artwork from 1938 by Pasquale Giovanni Napoliatano. He takes it to the Hollywood Park Racetrack to get it evaluated and gets a nice profit. Dave spends $775 on a unit full of household items. Nabila spends $425 on a unit containing an antique musket, but it turns out to be a reproduction. Jarrod and Brandi did not attend the auction, and Darrell leaves the auction empty-handed.
49	30	"Operation Hobo"	Harbor City, CA	January 17, 2012
The buyers are undetermined in Harbor City, California. Barry dresses up as a crazy old man in order to get an edge on the crowd. His guise pays off as he spends $300 on a unit, only to find a collection of antique medical devices, including a tooth extractor, an electric device for numbing, and amputation saws. Dave spends $1,600 on two motorbikes stored within a unit, Jarrod and Brandi spend $2,100 on a unit full of household items, and Darrell makes a big loss on his $6,650 locker, despite finding a blowgun.
50	31	"Blame It on The Rain"	Santa Cruz, CA	January 24, 2012
After the rain in Santa Cruz, California, Barry spends $1,750 on a unit containing a wine corking machine and a locked safe. Jarrod himself $100 despite not buying a locker, after Barry pays him to unlock the safe. Darrell spends $575 on a unit containing three custom surfboards, which he takes to get appraised by Howard "Boots" McGee and Harry Mayo at the Santa Cruz Surfing Museum. Dave spends $1,000 on a unit containing various different household items. Note: This episode shares its title with Milli Vanilli's 1989 hit narrative-song "Blame It On The Rain."
51	32	"Viva La San Francisco"	San Francisco, CA	January 24, 2012
The bidders are highest to San Francisco, California. Jarrod and Brandi spend $4,000 on two units - one containing a large vintage toolbox complete with tools and the other containing old stock from a furniture store. However, little do they know they've hit a goldmine when they find a collection of high-grade surveillance equipment. Barry buys a unit for $1,400 in which he discovers a 1930s-era boxing toy which he hopes is worth lots so he can break even with his purchase. Darrell hits the big time when he spends $2,850 on a unit containing new office equipment. Dave is surprised to be outbid by everyone, and heads home without a unit.
52	33	"Highland Anxiety"	Highland, CA	March 4, 2012
The buyers are East Highlands Ranch beautiful city in Highland, California. Barry spends $700 on a unit and discovers a collection of old signs. Jarrod and Brandi spend $200 on a unit, and discover a 1930s Royal Doulton water pitcher. However, the value is soon cut when Brandi accidentally cracks it. Darrell believes he has struck gold on a unit he spent $165 on, when he discovers a Russian-made fighter pilot flight suit and helmet, however, is it as rare as he believes? Dave once again walks away empty handed and decides he needs to up his game.

== Episode statistics ==
Although revealed at the end of the episode, the totals are not always reflective and exact of the value of items in the lockers. For example, in the episode "Fu Dog Day Afternoon", Barry found an art piece worth $6,000, but he was given a credit of zero because he intended to keep it. In many cases, the values of items are estimates made on the spot by the cast members, and are not necessarily actual profits or losses. Some of the episodes were not aired in the order that they were filmed. Therefore, the * column in each season's episode list indicates the sequential order of that episode.

#	*	Title	Air date	Dave Hester		Jarrod Schulz/ Brandi Passante		Darrell Sheets/ Brandon Sheets		Barry Weiss	
#	*	Title	Air date	Spent	Net profit/loss	Spent	Net profit/loss	Spent	Net profit/loss	Spent	Net profit/loss
20	1	"Hang 'Em High Desert"	July 20, 2011	$2,750.00	$1,140.00	N/A	$100.00^{1}	$1,150.00	$90.00	$1,100.00	$4,600.00
21	2	"Buyers on the Storm"	July 20, 2011	$1,350.00	$27,650.00	$1,800.00	$2,130.00	N/A	N/A	$450.00	$2,100.00
22	3	"Pay the Lady"	July 27, 2011	$1,500.00	$3,045.00	$200.00	$400.00	$145.00	$1,830.00	$225.00	$50.00
23	4	"Santa Ana Street Fight"	July 27, 2011	$345.00	$505.00	$2,350.00	$3,550.00	$275.00	$3,000.00	N/A	N/A
24	5	"Unclaimed Baggage"	August 3, 2011	$1,700.00	$1,640.00	N/A	N/A	$650.00	–$250.00	$1,525.00	–$1,525.00
25	6	"Enemy of the Enemy"	August 3, 2011	$9,000.00	$21,000.00	$2,800.00	–$700.00	N/A	N/A	$1,500.00	$5,500.00
26	7	"Fire in the Hole"	August 10, 2011	$1,400.00	$3,035.00	$1,300.00	–$660.00	N/A	N/A	$900.00	$3,600.00
27	8	"San Burrito"	August 10, 2011	————	————	$300.00	$6,700.00	N/A	N/A	$160.00	–$110.00
28	9	"Tanks for the Memories"	August 17, 2011	N/A	N/A	$2,700.00	$2,510.00	$575.00	$2,155.00	$425.00	–$45.00
29	10	"Land of the Loss"	August 17, 2011	N/A	N/A	$1,600.00	–$50.00	$1,550.00	–$970.00	$375.00	–$375.00
30	11	"Almost the Greatest Show on Earth"	August 31, 2011	$8,000.00	–$2,225.00	$1,700.00	–$760.00	N/A	N/A	$350.00	$3,100.00
31	12	"Bowling for Dollars"	September 7, 2011	$4,000.00	$5,360.00	$750.00	$850.00	N/A	N/A	$700.00	–$689.00
32	13	"Get Him to the Mayan"	September 7, 2011	N/A	N/A	$800.00	$2,845.00	$2,300.00	$5,060.00	$600.00	–$25.00
33	14	"Fu Dog Day Afternoon"	September 14, 2011	$35.00	$1,964.00	N/A	N/A	$2,100.00	$600.00	$500.00	–$500.00
34	15	"I'm the New Mogul"	October 19, 2011	$1,825.00	$7,175.00	$800.00	$2,110.00	$1,450.00	$6,050.00	$700.00	$800.00
35	16	"Driving Miss Barry"	November 15, 2011	$1,600.00	$1,200.00	$6,750.00	$5,350.00	N/A	N/A	$700.00	–$500.00
36	17	"Winner Winner Chicken Dinner"	November 15, 2011	————	————	$2,775.00	$3,675.00	$675.00	$925.00	$350.00	$275.00
37	18	"Auction Sesame"	November 22, 2011	————	————	$200.00	$450.00	$50.00	$545.00	$1,100.00	–$1,000.00
38	19	"Stairway to Hemet"	November 22, 2011	$3,800.00	$5,300.00	$1,900.00	$485.00	$2,900.00	$675.00	$1,250.00	–$1,250.00
39	20	"Scoot-A-Toot, Toot"	November 29, 2011	$2,500.00	$150.00	N/A	N/A	$850.00	$320.00	$1,000.00	$6,000.00
40	21	"The Empire Strikes Out"	November 29, 2011	N/A	N/A	$3,000.00	$160.00	$825.00	$850.00	$1,550.00	$2,450.00
41	22	"Make It Rain, Girl"	December 6, 2011	$750.00	$580.00	$2,200.00	$4,600.00	$2,500.00	$2,600.00	N/A	N/A
42	23	"Smoke 'Em If You Find 'Em"	December 13, 2011	N/A	N/A	$3,300.00	$5,400.00	N/A	N/A	$1,600.00	–$550.00
43	24	"The Drone Wars"	December 20, 2011	N/A	N/A	$3,400.00	$570.00	$7,000.00	$18,000.00	$1,650.00	$2,025.00
44	25	"Brandi's First Time"	January 3, 2012	$2,300.00	–$750.00	$2,600.00	–$2,300.00	$3,350.00	$2,140.00	N/A	N/A
45	26	"Hooray for Holly-Weird"	January 3, 2012	$900.00	$14,100.00	$1,250.00	–$975.00	N/A	N/A	$2,000.00	–$1,550.00
46	27	"Don't Bid So Close to Me"	January 10, 2012	$3,500.00	$1,925.00	$1,200.00	$890.00	N/A	N/A	$1,500.00	$3,040.00
47	28	"Not Your Average Bear"	January 10, 2012	N/A	N/A	————	————	$1,900.00	$920.00	$2.50	$1,997.50
48	29	"Hook, Line and Sucker"	January 17, 2012	$775.00	$725.00	————	————	N/A	N/A	$320.00	$4,680.00
49	30	"Operation Hobo"	January 17, 2012	$1,600.00	$0.00^{2}	$2,100.00	$500.00	$6,650.00	–$3,120.00	$300.00	$750.00
50	31	"Blame It on the Rain"	January 24, 2012	$1,000.00	$2,055.00	N/A	$100.00^{3}	$575.00	$521.00	$1,850.00	–$950.00
51	32	"Viva La San Francisco"	January 24, 2012	N/A	N/A	$4,000.00	$11,100.00	$2,800.00	$14,650.00	$1,400.00	–$25.00
52	33	"Highland Anxiety"	March 4, 2012	N/A	N/A	$200.00	$550.00	$165.00	$235.00	$700.00	$1,000.00
		Totals:		$50,630.00	$95,574.00	$51,975.00	$49,580.00	$40,435.00	$56,826.00	$26,782.50	$32,873.50
		Profit earned per dollar spent:		$1.89		$0.95		$1.41		$1.23	

=== Notes ===
- ^{1} Although Jarrod and Brandi didn't buy a unit, he earned $100 after winning a coin flip against Darrell.
- ^{2} Dave did not buy any units, but instead bought two bikes from a unit. It was not revealed how much profit he made.
- ^{3} Although Jarrod and Brandi didn't buy a unit, he earned $100 after being paid to crack open a safe for Barry.

=== Other Notes ===
- In "Enemy Of The Enemy", Mark Balelo spent $9,375 on five lockers.
- In "Fire In The Hole", Mark Balelo did not score a locker.
- In "San Burrito", Mark Balelo spent $925 and lost $105.
- In "Smoke 'Em If You Find 'Em", Nabila Haniss spent $450 and made a profit of $425.
- In "The Drone Wars", Nabila Haniss did not score a locker.
- In "Not Your Average Bear", Nabila Haniss spent $500 and made a profit of $1,230.
- In "Hook Line and Sucker", Nabila Haniss spent $425 and lost $45.
- In "Operation Hobo", Nabila Haniss did not score a locker.
