= Storage Wars season 1 =

Storage Wars
- Season 1

Release
- Original network: A&E
- Original release: December 1, 2010 – April 20, 2011

Season chronology
- Next → Season 2

The first season of the reality television show, Storage Wars aired on A&E from December 1, 2010 to April 20, 2011. It consisted of 19 episodes, beginning with the "High Noon in the High Dessert" and ending with "Live and Let Bid".

Seventeen of the episodes for season one of Storage Wars were filmed at various self-storage facilities throughout Southern California, including Mini-U Storage, Storage Outlet and Extra Storage. Two special episodes were filmed on location at a pair of StorageOne facilities in Las Vegas, Nevada.

== Episode overview ==
No. overall	No. in season	Title	Location	Original release date
1	1	"High Noon in the High Desert"	Victorville, CA and Simi Valley, CA	December 1, 2010
The buyers head up to Victorville, California for the auction. Dave spends $800 on a locker he believes to contain a Hammond B3 organ - but was his find too good to be true? Jarrod angers Brandi by spending $700 on a locker containing an old Honda Accord, and sets upon proving he was right to invest. Darrell spends $450 on a locker containing a set of futuristic-looking tables and chairs, and Barry visits a moving house auction in Simi Valley, because he bought nothing earlier, where he spends $340 on a collection of clothing belonging to rap magnate Suge Knight.
2	2	"Railroad Roulette"	Westminster, CA	December 1, 2010
In an attempt to beat the competition in Westminster, Barry brings a dwarf, Jay, with him to the auction, in order to get a better idea of what is inside the lockers. He spends $850 on a unit containing some curved glass - but will it be the payoff he was hoping for? Dave and Darrell bid on a locker containing equipment belonging to a restaurant, and Dave ends up owning the unit then soon finds himself in the region of a $20,000 payout. Brandi and Jarrod believe they have stumbled upon a $950 Movado watch in their $350 unit – but with many fakes being produced nowadays, will it be a big win, or a big loss?
3	3	"War on the Shore"	Huntington Beach, CA	December 8, 2010
The buyers are held down in Huntington Beach, California. Barry spends $275 on a locker full of equipment from a hair salon, unsure of what he really wants from it. However, he soon discovers a baby grand piano, which, if authentic, could earn him a big payout. Dave spends nearly $4,000 on a unit containing an auto dealing trailer. But is it enough to earn him a profit? Darrell spends $850 on a unit full of stacked boxes. His worries are put to one side, however, when he comes across a collection of signed sports memorabilia and baseball cards.
4	4	"Melee in the Maze"	Cerritos, CA	December 8, 2010
The buyers are going to Cerritos, California. Dave spends $1,800 on the remaining stock of what appears to be a sports or outdoor activity store. He uncovers a nice little collection of handcrafted bamboo fishing rods, much to Darrell's dismay. Brandi bids on a unit for Jarrod which contains a lockbox - and despite the lockbox having nothing it, the pair come away with a tidy profit when they find a collection of new electronic goods. Darrell spends $400 on a unit by accident, but soon discovers a sizable coin collection worth nearly $6,000. Barry forgot there was an auction before he came.
5	5	"The Old Spanish Standoff"	Riverside, CA	December 15, 2010
The buyers are going to Riverside, which is a quality room. Barry purchases a unit for $600 which contains a box marked 'Elvis stuff'. Although he fails to find what he was looking for, he does come across an antique moonshine still, which could earn him a little profit. Darrell spots a Bell commercial mannequin phone display in a unit, and pushing Dave off the scent, scoops it for $250. Dave spends $650 on a unit filled with contractor's equipment, and later buys a unit for $1300 containing office and janitorial equipment. However, both turn out to be duds.
6	6	"All Guns To Port"	Long Beach, CA	December 15, 2010
Long Beach hosts an auction. Barry spends $250 on a unit containing several boxes marked 'Fragile'. When he comes across a collection of flare guns, he finds himself earning nearly ten times what he paid for the unit. Dave spends $1,600 on a unit containing various tools and cowboy items - but comes across a diamond bracelet worth nearly $4,000. Darrell leaves the auction early to go home and rest, as he has the flu, and Brandi and Jarrod end up spending $300 on a unit packed full of trash.
7	7	"Senior Center Showdown"	Homeland, CA and Inglewood, CA	December 22, 2010
The buyers took in Homeland, California. Darrell spends $1450 on a unit filled with furniture, but is displeased with the fact that Dave took advantage of his son, Brandon, to drive the price up. Dave spends $750 on a pile of old newspapers, much to Barry's dismay, but has he discovered something worth a fortune? Jarrod leaves Brandi behind to visit another auction in Inglewood, and ends up spending $875 on a unit in a battle against Darrell. However, he soon finds an antique safe, which could net him a nice tidy profit.
8	8	"Midnight in the Gardena Good and Evil"	Gardena, CA	January 12, 2011
In a further attempt to gain headway over his competition in Gardena, Barry brings along two psychics to the auction who have a dark feeling about the lockers. However, his actions have a better effect than he had hoped for - he scares off Dave, who leaves the auction in disgust. Jarrod and Brandi spend $1,700 on a unit, unsure of what it contains. But will their gamble pay off? Darrell spends $3 on a locker, knowing he can make some sort of profit.
9	9	"Collector's Last Stand"	Norwalk, CA	January 19, 2011
The buyers scripted to Norwalk. Darrell spends $450 on a locker, in which he uncovers a seemingly common painting. But little does he know that somebody had decided to stash over $1000 in used notes in the back of it. Barry spends $375 on a unit, in which he hopes to find a nice item to add to his collection of oddities. Brandi and Jarrod find common ground in a heated battle against Dave, in which he purchases a $1450 locker from right under them.
10	10	"School House Lock"	Fullerton, CA and Long Beach, CA	January 26, 2011
The buyers are going to Fullerton. Barry spends $500 on a locker, in which he discovers a collection of Gospel and Blues records from the 1920s, including an Edison disc record. However, will his pay-out be as big as he had hoped? Jarrod and Brandi spend $650 on a locker full of equipment belonging to a school groundskeeper. Darrell spends $400 on a locker full of household goods, but after finding nothing 'special', he gives the unit to Dave for free. However, surprisingly enough, Dave manages to make a profit, much to Darrell's dismay.
11	11	"Gambler's Last Resort"	Las Vegas, NV	February 2, 2011
In the first half of a three-day auction marathon in Las Vegas, Dave spends $275 on a locker full of household items. However, he soon comes across a rare rock collection, and much to nobody's surprise, manages to turn a nice tidy little profit. Darrell spends a little over $1,000 on a unit, and discovers a collection of rare and antique jewellery, to which he makes a profit of over $16,000. Jarrod and Brandi discover several old pairs of Levis jeans in a $175 locker, and Barry leaves the first half of the auction empty handed.
12	12	"Auction Royale"	Las Vegas, NV	February 9, 2011
In the second half of a three-day auction marathon in Las Vegas, Barry spends $350 on a unit, and finds an old S&H Green Stamps sign, which he believes could be worth a nice little profit. Darrell spends $175 on a collection of Moser vases. Dave spends $1,650 on a unit containing a selection of household items. When going through the locker he claims will bring over $3,000 in profits, but the end tally only states he made $1,850 for some reason. Jarrod and Brandi earn themselves a $600 profit when they find a collection of casino chips.
13	13	"Makings of a Mogul"	Perris, CA	March 16, 2011
In Perris, California. Barry spends $800 on a unit filled with power tools, whilst in the midst of a bidding war with Jarrod. However, he later decides to sell the unit to Jarrod, and his $4 return on the locker proves less than satisfactory. Dave spends $60 on a unit full of old clothes, but later decides to give them away to Goodwill. Darrell spends over $4,000 on a unit, but manages to reap in nearly double what he paid. Dave reveals his trade secret to storage auction success and how he became so successful.
14	14	"Trouble the Oil"	Long Beach, CA	March 23, 2011
The buyers are oiled to Long Beach, California. Jarrod and Brandi spend $300 on a locker, and begin to regret their decision - until they find an antique phonograph. Dave spends $375 on a locker which contains an antique bike, which he believes is worth $800 - but has Barry spotted something wrong with it that he hasn't? Barry spends $675 on a locker with some pewter objects in it - and stumbles across a pair of engraved oil rig hard hats. Darrell saves his money for the next auction.
15	15	"Chairman of the Hoard"	Orange, CA	March 30, 2011
When six lockers all previously owned by one tenant go up for auction in Orange, the buyers suspect that they could be on the trail of a collector's worldly possessions. However, they soon begin to realize that the units belonged to a compulsive hoarder. Barry spends $850 on a locker containing the first ever issue of Hot Rod magazine, Jarrod and Brandi spend $1,050 on a unit containing some antique furniture, which they ask Dave to appraise, and Dave spends $300 on a locker containing only a small dresser and a mattress - only to stumble upon a massive jewelry collection.
16	16	"High End Heist"	Torrance, CA	April 6, 2011
The buyers visit a part of town well known for its antiques and collectibles in Torrance. Dave spends $500 on a unit filled with vintage furniture, but hits the jackpot when he comes across a collection of samurai swords. Barry spends $825 on a unit containing a land sail - but lives to regret his decision when he finds there is no sail. Jarrod and Brandi bid on separate units in an attempt to discover which of them is the better buyer.
17	17	"Young with the Gun"	Riverside, CA	April 13, 2011
The buyers are patched in Riverside, where there are 15 units for sale. Barry spends $575 on a locker containing a mystery trunk - but will it contain the type of valuables he is looking for? New buyer Bill Archer outbids Jarrod and Brandi on a unit they desperately want, but will his $2,600 bid reap him some profit? Darrell spends $1,000 on a unit full of clothes and old books, but does he have any titles with value? Dave misses the auction to continue work on his store, but ends up with a little surprise when Barry sends him a box full of free fur coats - Dave ends up winning the auction, even though he didn't attend it.
18	18	"Skullduggery"	Yucaipa, CA	April 17, 2011
The buyers are going to Yucaipa, When Dave spends $1,350 on a locker to spite Jarrod, he expects to make a loss. However, he ends up making a profit when he uncovers a collection of medical bones and a human skull. Brandi and Jarrod discover a gold leaf horse head sculpture, which turns their $475 investment into $2,000 of profit, and Darrell spends $850 on a unit, in which he uncovers an antique toilet and desk, as well as a collection of antique furniture. Barry saves his money for the next auction.
19	19	"Live and Let Bid"	Encinitas, CA	April 20, 2011
The buyers are hippie dippie in Encinitas. Dave brings his son along to the auction, and complete with his life savings of $5,600, spends $5,550 on a unit which contains two antique slot machines and hope that there worth something. Darrell tries to land a bad locker on Dave, but ends up getting it dropped on by Dave by spending $250 of his own money on it - only to discover an antique medical bleeder worth $500. Barry spends $375 on a locker containing an antique waterphone, but is his buy as good as it seems? Jarrod and Brandi leave the auction empty handed.

== Episode statistics ==
Although revealed at the end of the episode, the totals are not always reflective and exact of the value of items in the lockers. In the episode "Senior Center Showdown", Barry failed to buy a unit, but he was given a credit of $30.00, because he later bet his day's budget on a game of bridge, and won. In many cases, the values of items are estimates made on the spot by the cast members, and are not necessarily actual profits or losses. Some of the episodes were not aired in the order that they were filmed. Therefore, the * column in each season's episode list indicates the sequential order of that episode.

#	*	Title	Air date	Dave Hester		Jarrod Schulz/ Brandi Passante		Darrell Sheets/ Brandon Sheets		Barry Weiss	
#	*	Title	Air date	Spent	Net profit/loss	Spent	Net profit/loss	Spent	Net profit/loss	Spent	Net profit/loss
1	1	"High Noon in the High Desert"	December 1, 2010	$800.00	$1,987.00	$700.00	$1,850.00	$450.00	$650.00	$340.00	$9,000.00
2	2	"Railroad Roulette"	December 1, 2010	$2,600.00	$19,000.00	$350.00	$50.00	N/A	N/A	$850.00	$3,100.00
3	3	"War on the Shore"	December 8, 2010	$3,900.00	$1,992.00	N/A	N/A	$850.00	$2,650.00	$275.00	$11,725.00
4	4	"Melee in the Maze"	December 8, 2010	$1,800.00	$9,203.00	$800.00	$2,300.00	$400.00	$5,832.00	N/A	N/A^{1}
5	5	"The Old Spanish Standoff"	December 15, 2010	$1,950.00	–$400.00	N/A	N/A	$250.00	$1,750.00	$600.00	$400.00
6	6	"All Guns To Port"	December 15, 2010	$1,600.00	$4,850.00	$300.00	$0.00	N/A	N/A	$250.00	$2,250.00
7	7	"Senior Center Showdown"	December 22, 2010	$750.00	$89,250.00	$875.00	$2,100.00	$1,450.00	$2,000.00	N/A	$30.00^{2}
8	8	"Midnight in the Gardena Good and Evil"	January 12, 2011	N/A	N/A	$1,700.00	$12,800.00	$3.00	$27.00	$550.00	$450.00
9	9	"Collector's Last Stand"	January 19, 2011	$1,450.00	$3,500.00	N/A	N/A	$450.00	$1,300.00	$375.00	–$375.00
10	10	"School House Lock"	January 26, 2011	$1,000.00	$967.00	$650.00	$3,239.00	$400.00	–$400.00^{3}	$500.00	–$175.00
11	11	"Gambler's Last Resort"	February 2, 2011	$275.00	$4,725.00	$175.00	$1,025.00	$1,100.00	$16,675.00	N/A	N/A
12	12	"Auction Royale"	February 9, 2011	$1,650.00	$1,850.00	$200.00	$512.00	$175.00	$3,025.00	$350.00	–$350.00
13	13	"Makings of a Mogul"	March 16, 2011	$60.00	–$60.00	N/A	N/A	$4,275.00	$3,275.00	$800.00	–$796.00
14	14	"Trouble the Oil"	March 23, 2011	$375.00	–$125.00	$300.00	$300.00	N/A	N/A	$650.00	$350.00
15	15	"Chairman of the Hoard"	March 30, 2011	$300.00	$12,100.00	$1,050.00	$2,087.00	N/A	N/A	$850.00	–$840.00
16	16	"High End Heist"	April 6, 2011	$500.00	$1,975.00	$650.00	$1,195.00	N/A	N/A	$825.00	–$650.00
17	17	"Young with the Gun"	April 13, 2011	N/A	$648.00^{4}	N/A	N/A	$1,000.00	–$788.00	$575.00	–$475.00
18	18	"Skullduggery"	April 17, 2011	$1,350.00	$525.00	$475.00	$1,860.00	$850.00	$300.00	N/A	N/A
19	19	"Live and Let Bid"	April 19, 2011	$5,550.00^{5}	$1,889.00	N/A	N/A	$250.00	$547.00	$375.00	–$275.00
		Totals:		$25,910.00	$153,876.00	$8,225.00	$29,318.00	$11,903.00	$36,843.00	$8,165.00	$23,369.00
		Profit earned per dollar spent:		$5.94		$3.56		$3.10		$2.86	

=== Notes ===
- ^{1} Barry forgot there was an auction in Cerritos before he came.
- ^{2} It was revealed at the end of the episode that despite not spending any money at the auction, Barry bet his entire budget for the day at a bridge tournament, which earned him a profit of $30.00.
- ^{3} Darrell bought a unit for $400. And after he looked through the unit for profitable items, he soon gives it to Dave for free because he thought there was no money to be made on the unit. Later after Dave gets the unit, he ends up making money on the unit he got from Darrell.
- ^{4} Although Dave did not attend the auction in Riverside, Barry donated a collection of fur coats to him, as he did not wish to keep/sell them. Dave made an overall profit of $648.00 on the collection of coats.
- ^{5} This locker was bought by Dave's son, Dave Hester Jr.
