= Rimforest, California =

Unincorporated community in California, United States

Rimforest
- Unincorporated community
- Location within the state of California Rimforest (the United States)
- Coordinates: 34°13′47″N 117°13′30″W
- Country: United States
- State: California
- County: San Bernardino
- Elevation: 5,642 ft (1,720 m)

Population (2010)
  - Total: 400
- Time zone: UTC-8 (Pacific (PST))
  - Summer (DST): UTC-7 (PDT)
- ZIP codes: 92378
- FIPS code: 60760
- GNIS feature ID: 248195

Rimforest is an unincorporated community in the San Bernardino Mountains of San Bernardino County, California, United States. It is located along California State Route 18. Rimforest has a post office with ZIP code 92378, which opened in 1949. Rimforest was featured in a season 5 episode of Storage Wars.
