= Wesley Dening =

Television producer and presenter

- Born: 14 July 1983 (age 43)
- Education: St. Joseph's Nudgee College (2000)
- Occupations: Television producer, television host
- Known for: Big Brother; Totally Wild
- Children: 3

Wesley Dening (born 14 July 1983) is an Australian television producer based in Los Angeles.

== Early life ==
Dening grew up in the Queensland capital of Brisbane, in Australia. He attended high school at St. Joseph's Nudgee College, graduating in 2000. During his teen years, Dening was a national-level swimmer and also worked as an actor and model, even winning Young Model of the Year. Dening was founder of 'Seriously Pink', a fashion franchise in central Brisbane.

At the age of 18, Dening lived in London, and on his return to Australia, he decided to audition for reality TV series Big Brother, hoping it would help him break into television.

== Career ==
Dening originally appeared as a contestant on Big Brother Australia 2004, at the age of 20. Following this, he had a chance meeting with the executive producer of Network 10 travel adventure show Totally Wild, leading to an unpaid job on the series, where he contributed to stories and writing scripts. He was then offered a six month presenting contract, after which time he became a producer, at the age of 21.

He also appeared in radio advertisements for local Brisbane stations 4BC, B105 and Triple M. and narrated the 2005 documentary Ghosts of the Gulf. In 2005, he also became an ambassador for Tourism Queensland

In 2006, Dening's work as a reporter earned him a Logie Award nomination for Best New Talent on Television. That same year, together with a team from Totally Wild he travelled to Antarctica, where he filmed six special half hour episodes for Totally Wild: Antarctica Special (2007) as well as an episode of Network 10 children’s science series Scope and a documentary. The special was distributed to numerous other countries and was the recipient of the Australian Antarctic Arts Fellowship. It was also nominated for a Logie Award in 2008.

Dening became a sports reporter for 10 News First Queensland and reported for children's Auskick series Kick2Kick for Network 10, and the documentary Spirit of the Outback. He was also guest co-host for Toasted TV and the 2008 Australian New Year's Eve telecast.

Dening met with the BBC in London, with hopes of furthering his career overseas, but in 2008, relocated to New York instead, at the age of 25. The following year, he made his U.S. television debut, on cable network truTV's The Smoking Gun Presents: World's Dumbest as one of the co-hosts, alongside Daniel Baldwin and Danny Bonaduce.

In 2010, Dening founded the production company WD Entertainment, which has since been responsible for series that have aired in more than 55 countries. The company's first TV series, the 2011 six-part The Stafford Brothers, following the rise of the titular DJ's, premiered on Fox8 in Australia. A huge success, a 2012 second season was aired and the show was broadcast internationally. That same year, Dening hosted and starred in a hidden camera prank series for Disney Channel called Code: 9.

Dening created and executive-produced wine and travel series The Flying Winemaker on Discovery Channel in 2014, followed by Big Crazy Family Adventure on the Travel Channel in 2015.

Dening joined Eureka Productions in 2016 as senior vice president of programming and development, before being promoted to the role of executive vice president in 2018. Then in July 2022, he was appointed as head of global formats.

In 2018, Dening waa executive producer on classic car restoration and resale reality series Pick, Flip & Drive, for Facebook Watch, winning multiple Telly Awards and landing a nomination for a Cannes Content Innovation Award. From 2018, he was also executive producer for the multi-season Animal Planet series Crikey! It's the Irwins (2018–2022), including the specials Crikey! It's The Irwin's Life in Lockdown and Crikey! It's the Irwins: Bindi's Wedding.

Beginning in 2019, Dening was also executive producer of ABC's Holey Moley, an extreme miniature golf competition series produced by Eureka Productions and Stephen Curry's company Unanimous Media. A breakout success, the series won the Realscreen 2020 Award for Best New Format and was nominated for both a Rose d'Or Award for Entertainment Program of the Year, and a Content Innovation Award in Cannes. As executive producer of 2019 American reality dating series Dating Around on Netflix, Dening won the Critic's Choice Award for Best Relationship Series, and was nominated for another Content Innovation Award.

Further executive producer credits have included celebrity talent series The Real Dirty Dancing (2019) for Fox, floristry competition series Full Bloom (2020–2021) for HBO Max, and dating series Twentysomethings: Austin (2021) for Netflix.

Together with Channing Tatum and Steven Soderbergh, Dening was an executive producer on 2021 reality competition series Finding Magic Mike for HBO Max, which was created during Covid lockdown. He continues to be at the helm of numerous series in both the U.S. and Australia, including CBS reality dating series The Real Love Boat (2022) Netflix competition series The Mole (2022), The Parent Test (2022–2023), dating series The Farmer Wants a Wife (2023), Fox celebrity space series Stars on Mars (2023) featuring William Shatner, singing competition series Australian Idol (2023–2024), game show The Floor (2024) hosted by Rob Lowe, game show The Quiz with Balls (2024–2026) and Apple TV music competition series KPopped (2025).

== Personal life ==
Denying is married to wife Michala, with whom he has three kids. She moved with him to New York in 2008, when she was his girlfriend.

== Filmography ==
=== As presenter ===
Year	Title	Role	Notes	Ref
2004	Big Brother Australia 2004	Contestant		
2004	Totally Wild	Presenter		
2005	Ghosts of the Gulf	Narrator	Documentary	
2007	Totally Wild: Antarctica Special	Presenter	6 episodes	
2007	Scope	Guest co-host	1 episode	
	Kick2Kick	Sports reporter		
	AFL Grand Final	Sports reporter		
	10 News First Queensland	Sports reporter		
	Spirit of the Outback	Host	Documentary	
	Toasted TV	Guest co-host		
2008	New Year's Eve telecast	Co-host	TV special	
2009–2012	The Smoking Gun Presents: World's Dumbest	Co-host	70 episodes	
2010	In the Qube	Self	13 episodes	
2012	Code: 9	Host	6 episodes	

=== As executive producer ===
Year	Title	Role	Notes	Ref
2006	Totally Wild	Producer		
2011–2012	The Stafford Brothers	Creator / Writer / Director / Executive producer	16 episodes	
2014	The Flying Winemaker	Creator / Director / Executive-producer		
2015	Big Crazy Family Adventure	Executive producer	9 episodes	
2018	Pick, Flip & Drive	Executive producer	8 episodes	
2018–2022	Crikey! It's the Irwins	Executive producer	39 episodes	
2019	The Real Dirty Dancing	Executive producer	3 episodes	
2019–2020	Dating Around	Executive producer / Consulting producer	12 episodes	
2019–2022	Holey Moley	Executive producer	45 episodes	
2020–2021	Full Bloom	Executive producer	14 episodes	
2021	Crikey! It's Shark Week	Executive producer	TV special	
2021	Finding Magic Mike	Executive producer	7 episodes	
2021	Twentysomethings: Austin	Executive producer	12 episodes	
2022	The Real Love Boat	Executive producer / Producer	14 episodes	
2022	The Mole	Executive producer	10 episodes	
2022–2023	The Parent Test	Executive producer	10 episodes	
2023	The Farmer Wants a Wife	Executive producer	11 episodes	
2023	Stars on Mars	Executive producer	8 episodes	
2023–2024	Australian Idol	Executive producer	46 episodes	
2024	The Floor	Executive producer	9 episodes	
2024–2026	The Quiz with Balls	Executive producer	9 episodes	
2025	KPopped	Executive producer	1 episode	
