= The Real Dirty Dancing (American TV series) =

American dance competition television series

- Genre: Reality competition
- Based on: The Real Dirty Dancing
- Presented by: Stephen "tWitch" Boss
- Country of origin: United States
- Original language: English
- No. of seasons: 1
- No. of episodes: 4

Production
- Executive producers: Chris Culvenor; Paul Franklin; Wes Dening; Dave Emery; Dan Martin
- Production companies: Eureka Productions; Lionsgate Television

Original release
- Network: Fox
- Release: February 1 – February 22, 2022

The Real Dirty Dancing is an American dance competition television series that aired on Fox from February 1 to 22, 2022. It is an adaptation of the Australian series, and was hosted by Stephen "tWitch" Boss.

== Production ==
On January 19, 2022, it was announced that Fox had ordered the series, with Stephen "tWitch" Boss as the host and Chris Culvenor, Paul Franklin, Wes Dening, Dave Emery and Dan Martin as the executive producers. The names of the celebrities competing were also announced. The series premiered on February 1, 2022. It replaced the previously scheduled debut of Monarch, which was delayed to a fall 2022 launch at the request of The Resident creator Amy Holden Jones.

== Contestants ==
Celebrity	Notability (known for)	Status	Ref.
Howie Dorough	Backstreet Boys singer	Eliminated 1st on February 8, 2022	
Loni Love	The Real co-host	Eliminated 1st on February 8, 2022	
Antonio Gates	Former NFL tight end	Eliminated 2nd on February 15, 2022	
Brie Bella	WWE wrestler	Eliminated 2nd on February 15, 2022	
Tyler Cameron	Television personality and model	Runners-up on February 22, 2022	
Anjelah Johnson-Reyes	Actress and comedian	Runners-up on February 22, 2022	
Corbin Bleu	High School Musical actor	Winners on February 22, 2022	
Cat Cora	Celebrity chef	Winners on February 22, 2022	

== Elimination table ==
Results
Contestant	Episodes			
Contestant	1	2	3	4
Cat	BABY	BABY	SAFE	WINNERS
Corbin	SAFE	JOHNNY	SAFE	WINNERS
Anjelah	SAFE	SAFE	SAFE	RUNNERS-UP
Tyler	JOHNNY	SAFE	SAFE	RUNNERS-UP
Antonio	SAFE	SAFE	OUT	
Brie	SAFE	SAFE	OUT	
Howie	SAFE	OUT		
Loni	SAFE	OUT		

Best Baby
Best Johnny
Eliminated from the competition.

== Weeks ==
=== Week 1 (February 1) ===
Performances on the first episode
#	Couple	Song
1	Corbin & Cat	"Big Girls Don't Cry" by The Four Seasons
2	Tyler & Loni	"Hey! Baby" by Bruce Channel
3	Howie & Anjelah	"Be My Baby" by The Ronettes
4	Antonio & Brie	"Love Man" by Otis Redding

- Best Baby: Cat
- Best Johnny: Tyler

=== Week 2 (February 8) ===
Jane Brucker served as a guest host.

Performances on the second episode
#	Couple	Song	Result
1	Corbin & Cat	"Hungry Eyes" by Eric Carmen	Safe
2	Howie & Loni	"Hungry Eyes" by Eric Carmen	Eliminated
3	Antonio & Brie	"Hungry Eyes" by Eric Carmen	Safe
4	Tyler & Anjelah	"Hungry Eyes" by Eric Carmen	Safe

- Best Baby: Cat
- Best Johnny: Corbin

=== Week 3 (February 15) ===
Allison Holker served as a guest host.

Performances on the third episode
#	Couple	Song	Result
1	Tyler & Anjelah	"Do You Love Me" by The Contours	Safe
2	Antonio & Brie	"Do You Love Me" by The Contours	Eliminated
3	Corbin & Cat	"Do You Love Me" by The Contours	Safe

=== Week 4 (February 22) ===
Performances on the fourth episode
#	Couple	Song	Result
1	Tyler & Anjelah	"(I've Had) The Time of My Life" by Bill Medley & Jennifer Warnes	Runners-up
2	Corbin & Cat	"(I've Had) The Time of My Life" by Bill Medley & Jennifer Warnes	Winners

== Episodes ==
No.	Title	Original release date	Prod. code	U.S. viewers (millions)
1	"They Carried a Watermelon..."	February 1, 2022	SP-2212	1.54
2	"This Is No Summer Vacation..."	February 8, 2022	SP-2213	1.50
3	"How Do You Call Your Loverboy?"	February 15, 2022	SP-2214	1.48
4	"The Finale: They Had the Time of Their Lives..."	February 22, 2022	SP-2215	1.40

== Ratings ==
Viewership and ratings per episode of The Real Dirty Dancing
No.	Title	Air date	Timeslot (ET)	Rating/share (18–49)	Viewers (millions)	DVR (18–49)	DVR viewers (millions)	Total (18–49)	Total viewers (millions)	Ref.
1	"They Carried a Watermelon..."	February 1, 2022	Tuesday 9:00 p.m.	0.2/2	1.54	—N/a	—N/a	—N/a	—N/a	
2	"This Is No Summer Vacation..."	February 8, 2022	Tuesday 9:00 p.m.	0.2/2	1.50	—N/a	—N/a	—N/a	—N/a	
3	"How Do You Call Your Loverboy?"	February 15, 2022	Tuesday 9:00 p.m.	0.3/2	1.48	—N/a	—N/a	—N/a	—N/a	
4	"The Finale: They Had the Time of Their Lives..."	February 22, 2022	Tuesday 9:00 p.m.	0.2/2	1.40	0.0	0.27	0.2	1.67	(Note: Live+7 ratings were unavailable, so Live+3 ratings have been used instead.)
