= The Parent Test =

US reality TV program

- Genre: Reality show
- Based on: Parental Guidance by: Chris Culvenor; Paul Franklin; Eden Gaha; Wesley Dening
- Directed by: Brian Smith
- Presented by: Ali Wentworth; Adolph Brown
- Country of origin: United States
- Original language: English
- No. of seasons: 1
- No. of episodes: 10

Production
- Executive producers: Chris Culvenor; Wesley Dening; Charles Wachter; Brian Smith; Paul Franklin; Eden Gaha; David Tibballs
- Camera setup: Multi-camera
- Running time: 42–43 minutes
- Production companies: Eureka Productions; Walt Disney Television Alternative

Original release
- Network: ABC
- Release: December 15, 2022 – February 16, 2023

The Parent Test is an American reality show on ABC hosted by Ali Wentworth and parenting and psychology expert Adolph Brown. It is based on the Australian format Parental Guidance and is also produced by Chris Culvenor. It features 12 different families, each representing a different parenting style. Each week the participants face different parenting challenges to see which is the most effective style.

== Families ==
Family	No. Of Kids	Parenting Style
Sarah and Michael Wynne	3	New Age
Jonathan and Willa Leong	1	Intensive
Yan Dekel and Alex Maghan	2	Routine
Eric and Heather Webb	4	Nature
Jason and Elizabeth Day	4	Free Range
Dennis Williams	1	High Achievement
Abe and Rachel Mills	6	Strict
Chuck and Kiki Ng	1	Negotiation
Hashim and Johnetta Lafond	6	Helicopter
Andrea McCoy	1	Discipline
Annie and Arlo Sarinas	2	Child-Led
Peyman and Shirin Yadegar	4	Traditional

== Elimination Table ==
Family	2	4	6	7	8	9	10
McCoy			SAFE			WIN	WINNER
Day		SAFE			WIN		RUNNER-UP
Wynne	SAFE			WIN			RUNNER-UP
Sarinas			SAFE			OUT	Jury
Yadegar			SAFE			OUT	Jury
Mills		SAFE			OUT	Jury	
Williams		SAFE			OUT	Jury	
Leong	SAFE			OUT	Jury		
Webb	SAFE			OUT	Jury		
Lafond			OUT	Jury			
Ng		OUT	Jury				
Maghan-Dekel	OUT	Jury					

== Episodes ==
No.	Title	Original release date	U.S. viewers (millions)
1	"Which Way Is the Right Way?"	December 15, 2022	1.99
Families take on the "high dive challenge" and the "yes day challenge."
2	"Stranger Danger"	January 5, 2023	2.34
Families take on the Fine Dining Challenge and the Home Alone Challenge; parents help their kids adapt to unfamiliar situations; the kids are met with an unexpected visitor.
3	"You Have to Make a Superhuman"	January 12, 2023	1.98
Strict, high achievement, free range and negotiation parenting styles take front and centre; the parents cope with their own anxiety when they are forced to relinquish control to their kids.
4	"Bubble Wrapped Children"	January 19, 2023	2.08
Strict, high achievement, free range and negotiation parents remain in the hot seat and brave challenges; the families also weigh in on the hot button topic of spanking.
5	"Let's Talk About Sex"	January 26, 2023	1.89
Disciplined, traditional, child-led and helicopter parents take the spotlight as their families face the equally unnerving Facts of Life and Snake Alert challenges.
6	"Every Parent's Worst Nightmare"	February 2, 2023	2.02
Disciplined, traditional, child-led and helicopter parents take the spotlight as their families face the Unexpected Pick-Up and Driving Me Crazy challenges.
7	"The Semi-Finals Begins"	February 9, 2023	1.97
Intensive, new age and natural families face the Kid in a Candy Store and No Escape Room challenges.
8	"Limits & Boundaries"	February 9, 2023	1.66
Strict, high achievement and free-range families return to the hot seat for a new set of challenges that tests the kids' abilities to function without their parents.
9	"It's All About Respect"	February 16, 2023	1.95
Disciplined, traditional and child-led parenting styles take centre stage; kids decide how their parents dress for a professional photo shoot; families must face fear and frustration when they are trapped in a seemingly endless maze.
10	"America's Most Effective Parenting Style"	February 16, 2023	1.49
The final two challenges of the season tackle some of the biggest obstacles families face; kids are observed while seeing someone else being bullied; one family takes home the title of the "Most Effective Parenting Style."

== Reception ==
Decider called the "idea that these parents are being judged off short clips and one will be chosen the 'most effective' is a complete turn-off for us."
