= Stars on Mars =

2023 American reality television series

- Genre: Reality competition
- Presented by: William Shatner
- Country of origin: United States
- Original language: English
- No. of seasons: 1
- No. of episodes: 12

Production
- Executive producers: Chris Culvenor; Paul Franklin; Wes Dening; Eden Gaha; Charles Wachter
- Producer: Greg Basser
- Production locations: Coober Pedy, Australia
- Production company: Eureka Productions

Original release
- Network: Fox
- Release: June 5 – August 28, 2023

Stars on Mars is an American reality competition series that aired on Fox from June 5 to August 28, 2023.

== Format ==
Stars on Mars features celebrities living together in a base camp designed to simulate living on Mars (actually located in Coober Pedy, Australia). Each cycle, the group elects one celebrity as "Base Commander" who assigns tasks to complete around the compound and oversees an upcoming mission. The Base Commander then selects another celebrity to be "Mission Specialist", who helps oversee the mission and becomes immune from elimination.

In each episode's mission, the group must collectively work to complete a space-themed task while being directed by the Base Commander and Mission Specialist. After each mission, the Mission Specialist and Base Commander must designate three celebrities as the "least mission critical", making them vulnerable for elimination. Afterwards, the group must come to a decision of which of these to eliminate (or "extract" from Mars).

== Production ==
On April 12, 2023, it was announced that Fox had ordered the series that was scheduled to premiere on June 5, 2023.

On May 4, 2023, the names of the celebrities competing were announced. During the July 10, 2023, episode, four additional celebrities joining the competition were revealed.

== Contestants ==
Celebrity	Notability	Entered	Exited	Result	Ref.
Christopher Mintz-Plasse	Actor	Episode 1	Episode 1	Eliminated	
Tallulah Willis	Daughter of Bruce Willis and Demi Moore	Episode 1	Episode 2	Eliminated	
Richard Sherman	NFL cornerback	Episode 1	Episode 3	Eliminated	
Natasha Leggero	Comedian, actress, and writer	Episode 1	Episode 4	Eliminated	
Tom Schwartz	Vanderpump Rules star	Episode 1	Episode 4	Eliminated	
Ashley Iaconetti	The Bachelor star	Episode 5	Episode 6	Eliminated	
Ronda Rousey	UFC fighter, WWE wrestler, and Olympic judoka	Episode 1	Episode 7	Eliminated	
Andy Richter	Comedian, actor and writer	Episode 5	Episode 8	Eliminated	
Lance Armstrong	Former professional cyclist	Episode 1	Episode 9	Eliminated	
Ariel Winter	Actress	Episode 1	Episode 10	Eliminated	
Marshawn Lynch	NFL running back	Episode 1	Episode 11	Eliminated	
Cat Cora	Iron Chef America star	Episode 5	Episode 12	Eliminated	
Paul Pierce	NBA player	Episode 5	Episode 12	Eliminated	
Porsha Williams Guobadia	The Real Housewives of Atlanta star	Episode 1	Episode 12	Eliminated	
Tinashe	Singer-songwriter	Episode 1	Episode 12	Runner-up	
Adam Rippon	Olympic figure skater	Episode 1	Episode 12	Winner	

== Elimination table ==
Results
Name	Episodes											
Name	1	2	3	4	5	6	7	8	9	10	11	12
Adam	RISK	SAFE	SAFE	RISK	BC	SAFE	MS	RISK	SAFE	SAFE	SAFE	WINNER
Tinashe	SAFE	SAFE	BC	SAFE	SAFE	MS	SAFE	SAFE	MS	SAFE	SAVED	RUNNER-UP
Porsha	SAFE	SAFE	SAFE	SAFE	MS	SAFE	SAFE	SAFE	BC	RISK	RISK	THIRD
Cat					ENTER	SAFE	RISK	BC	SAFE	MS	SAFE	FOURTH
Paul					ENTER	RISK	RISK	RISK	RISK	BC	SAFE	FIFTH
Marshawn	BC	RISK	RISK	SAFE	SAFE	SAFE	SAFE	SAFE	SAFE	RISK	OUT	
Ariel	SAFE	SAFE	MS	MS	SAFE	BC	SAFE	SAFE	RISK	OUT		
Lance	SAFE	SAFE	SAFE	SAFE	SAFE	SAFE	SAFE	MS	OUT			
Andy					ENTER	SAFE	BC	OUT				
Ronda	SAFE	SAFE	SAFE	BC	SAFE	RISK	OUT					
Ashley					ENTER	OUT						
Natasha	SAFE	MS	RISK	OUT								
Tom	RISK	RISK	SAFE	OUT								
Richard	SAFE	SAFE	OUT									
Tallulah	MS	OUT										
Christopher	OUT											

Color key:

The celebrity won Stars on Mars.
The celebrity was the runner-up.
The celebrity was named Base Commander and was safe for the cycle.
The celebrity was named Mission Specialist and was safe for the cycle.
The celebrity was not deemed Mission Critical and was at risk of being eliminated.
The celebrity was eliminated from the competition.
The celebrity was named Base Commander, but was still eliminated from the competition due to a mission failure.
The celebrity did not compete during the episode.
The celebrity entered the competition and was safe for the cycle.
The celebrity was on the losing team but was deemed Mission Critical by their teammates.

== Episodes ==
No.	Title	Original release date	Prod. code	U.S. viewers (millions)	Rating (18-49)
1	"The Experiment Begins"	June 5, 2023	SMA-101	1.32	0.2
Base Commander: Marshawn Lynch Mission Specialist: Tallulah Willis Mission: Raise the communication satellite tower and connect to the incoming satellite. Result: Mission success. Mission Patch: Leadership Extracted: Christopher Mintz-Plasse - for ultimately failing to contribute to the mission.
2	"Water Crisis"	June 12, 2023	SMA-102	0.99	0.2
Base Commander: Tallulah Willis Mission Specialist: Natasha Leggero Mission: Collect and fill four barrels of water from a cave. Result: Mission failure. Mission Patch: Teamwork Extracted: Tallulah Willis - for her poor performance as Base Commander, which caused the team to fail.
3	"Fire in the Hole"	June 19, 2023	SMA-103	0.86	0.2
Base Commander: Tinashe Mission Specialist: Ariel Winter Mission: Repair a hole in the biodome, caused by an explosion, then replant and fertilize the damaged crops. Result: Mission success. Mission Patch: Survivalist Extracted: Richard Sherman - for feeling isolated and stating that the other two least Mission Critical celebrities were better suited for the experiment than him.
4	"Life on Mars?"	June 26, 2023	SMA-104	0.91	0.2
Base Commander: Ronda Rousey Mission Specialist: Ariel Winter Mission: Find two "mother fungus spawn points" in a dark cave, destroy them with a flamethrower, then reconnect to backup oxygen at the rovers. Result: Mission success. Mission Patch: Perseverance Extracted: Natasha Leggero - voluntarily extracted after struggling with the conditions.; Tom Schwartz - for being less beneficial to save than Adam Rippon.
5	"Resupply Mission"	July 10, 2023	SMA-105	0.91	0.2
Base Commander: Adam Rippon Mission Specialist: Porsha Williams Mission: Safely dispose of two nuclear canisters and save the four new celebrities. Result: Mission success. Mission Patch: Ingenuity Extracted: None
6	"Leaks in the Hab"	July 17, 2023	SMA-106	1.01	0.2
Base Commander: Ariel Winter Mission Specialist: Tinashe Mission: Create a substance to patch up the holes. Result: Mission success. Mission Patch: Endurance Extracted: Ashley Iaconetti - for an inadequate performance in the mission, leading the group to question her future contributions.
7	"Evil AI"	July 24, 2023	SMA-107	0.88	0.2
Base Commander: Andy Richter Mission Specialist: Adam Rippon Mission: Reboot the AI, which is infected with an evil virus. Result: Mission success. Mission Patch: Intelligence Extracted: Ronda Rousey - voluntarily extracted for missing her baby.
8	"Solar Flare"	July 31, 2023	SMA-108	0.94	0.2
Base Commander: Cat Cora Mission Specialist: Lance Armstrong Mission: Connect the solar panels and make it back to base. Result: Mission success. Mission Patch: Trust Extracted: Andy Richter - for interrupting Cat's instructions during the mission.
9	"We Are Not Alone"	August 7, 2023	SMA-109	0.84	0.1
Base Commander: Porsha Williams Guobadia Mission Specialist: Tinashe Mission: Find the intruder in the air vents. Result: Mission success. Mission Patch: Adaptability Extracted: Lance Armstrong - voluntarily extracted due to concerns that his ongoing clashes with other contestants would hold the team back in the future.
10	"Downward Dog"	August 14, 2023	SMA-110	0.86	0.2
Base Commander: Paul Pierce Mission Specialist: Cat Cora Mission: Find the runaway RAD Dog that fell into a crevice. Result: Mission success. Mission Patch: Bravery Extracted: Ariel Winter - voluntarily extracted due to feeling that she had been the least Mission Critical in the day's mission.
11	"Distress Signal"	August 21, 2023	SMA-111	0.86	0.2
Mission: Rearrange satellites to boost the strength of the distress signals. Result: Team B (Adam, Cat, and Paul) succeeded. Mission Patch: Knowledge Extracted: Marshawn Lynch - for having contributed less during day-to-day life on Mars than Porsha.
12	"Brightest Star"	August 28, 2023	SMA-112	0.86	0.2
Mission: Power up a satellite to broadcast a message to Earth. Result: Adam succeeded, with Tinashe being deemed runner-up. Mission Patch: Brightest Star Extracted: Cat Cora & Paul Pierce - were not voted as being one of the three most Mission Critical contestants.; Porsha Williams - for performing the worst at trivia.
