= The Single Wives =

- Genre: Reality; Dating
- Created by: Chris Culvenor
- Country of origin: Australia
- Original language: English
- No. of series: 1
- No. of episodes: 8

Production
- Running time: 60 minutes
- Production company: Eureka Productions

Original release
- Network: Seven Network
- Release: 18 July – 23 August 2018

The Single Wives is an Australian reality television series hosted by Fifi Box which screened on the Seven Network. The show features four women who were formerly married, searching for another chance at love. They are assisted by dating coach Matthew Hussey.

== Plot ==
The series follows four women as they search for love. The women have all been married previously. Three are now divorced and one is widowed.

With the support of dating expert, Matthew Hussey, the women are put in various dating situations and are critiqued. As the women are forced to face some hard truths about themselves and their dating techniques, Hussey plays the role of advisor and coaches them towards more profound and less shallow relationships. In many instances, Hussey uses psychology to underpin many of the concepts he brings across to the women.

The women's names are Sheridan Buchanan-Sorensen, Sunnie Khakh, Emma Wynne and Nikki Mitropoulos.
