= Holey Moley =

Minigolf gameshow

- Also known as: Holey Moley II: The Sequel (2020); Holey Moley 3D in 2D (2021); Holey Moley Fore-Ever (2022)
- Genre: Sports entertainment; Reality competition; Comedy
- Created by: Chris Culvenor
- Directed by: Alex Van Wagner
- Presented by: Joe Tessitore; Rob Riggle; Jeannie Mai; Stephen Curry; The Muppets
- Country of origin: United States
- Original language: English
- No. of seasons: 4
- No. of episodes: 43

Production
- Executive producers: Chris Culvenor; Paul Franklin; Wesley Dening; Stephen Curry; Jeron Smith; Erick Peyton; Charles Wachter; Michael O'Sullivan
- Production companies: Unanimous Media; Eureka Productions

Original release
- Network: ABC
- Release: June 20, 2019 – July 12, 2022

Holey Moley is an American sports reality competition television series created for ABC by Chris Culvenor. The series is produced by Eureka Productions and Unanimous Media, with Culvenor, Paul Franklin, Wesley Dening, Stephen Curry, Jeron Smith, Erick Peyton, Charles Wachter, and Michael O'Sullivan serving as executive producers.

The series features contestants competing against each other in a series of head-to-head, sudden-death matchups on a supersized miniature golf obstacle course. Curry stars as the resident golf pro, with play-by-play commentator Joe Tessitore, color commentator Rob Riggle, and sideline correspondent Jeannie Mai. In October 2018, ABC announced they were developing a miniature golf game show. The series was officially announced in April 2019, along with Curry's involvement. Filming of the series takes place at Sable Ranch in Canyon Country, Santa Clarita, California.

Holey Moley premiered on June 20, 2019, and its first season consisted of 10 episodes. In October 2019, ABC renewed the series for a second season, titled Holey Moley II: The Sequel, and premiered on May 21, 2020. In February 2021, it was announced that the series was renewed for a third and fourth season. The third season, titled Holey Moley 3D in 2D, premiered on June 17, 2021. The fourth season, titled Holey Moley Fore-Ever, and featuring the Muppets, premiered on May 3, 2022.

In response to a viewer inquiry in June 2023, Andy Dehnart of the answer column "Ask Andy" reached out to ABC and other contacts, but received no response regarding the status of the show. He noted that the producers had issued a casting call for the fifth season, which stated that applicants must be available to travel internationally in February and March 2023. On May 10, 2024, TVLine reported that Holey Moley was among several shows on ABC that had "yet to be formally renewed for additional seasons."

== Production ==
=== Development ===
In October 2018, ABC released a casting call for a new game show called Mega Miniature Golf looking for miniature golfers to compete against each other for a grand prize. ABC officially announced the series in April 2019, with the title Holey Moley. Professional basketball player Stephen Curry serves as executive producer and resident golf pro on the series, with ESPN/ABC's Joe Tessitore calling all the play-by-play commentary, comedian and actor Rob Riggle providing color commentary, and television personality Jeannie Mai as a sideline reporter (with Tessitore and Riggle wearing the same jackets that were worn by ABC Sports commentators in the 1970s). The series is produced by Eureka Productions and Unanimous Media, and created by Chris Culvenor, who is executive producing alongside Curry, Paul Franklin, Wesley Dening, Charles Wachter, Michael O'Sullivan, Jeron Smith, and Erick Peyton. Culvenor explained that producers saw that other television competition series were dominated by fitness enthusiasts and wanted to create a show that most people could partake in. He called the series "a serious competition put in a really silly world."

=== Filming ===
Filming for the series takes place at Sable Ranch in Canyon Country, Santa Clarita, California, which was previously used for the obstacle course game show Wipeout. Filming lasts several weeks and occurs late at night. The production films as many competitions as possible at each course on a given night, rather than simply filming the contents of a single episode each night. The golf course and obstacles were built on the ranch by The ATS Team, which creates obstacle courses and large-scale fanciful environments for shows such as American Ninja Warrior, The Titan Games, and Big Brother, in association with Eureka Productions. Tessitore indicated that some holes, such as Double Dutch Courage, remain standing because it is "a signature hole", but others are "shut down after three or four days". Filming for the first season took place on April 3–5 and 8–11, 2019.

The second season was filmed in February and March 2020. The third and fourth seasons filmed back-to-back in March 2021, with a small number of recurring spectators due to the COVID-19 pandemic; additional footage of unmasked spectators filmed during previous seasons has been edited into these seasons.

== Gameplay ==
In the first season, each episode consisted of 12 mini-golfers that compete in a series of head-to-head, sudden-death matchups on a supersized miniature golf obstacle course. Winners move on to round two and from there, only three will make it to the third and final round, where they compete on the "Mt. Holey Moley" hole in a three-way contest. The winner earns "The Golden Putter" trophy, a "Holey Moley" plaid jacket and a $25,000 grand prize.

In the second season onwards, it was changed to 8 mini-golfers each episode with a new miniature golf obstacle course. Round one and two remains the same head-to-head, sudden-death matchups with winners of each matchups moving on. Round three was changed to a head-to-head matchup. The winner still earns "The Golden Putter" trophy and a "Holey Moley" plaid jacket, but instead of the $25,000 cash prize, the winner earns a spot in the finale where they may have a chance to putt to win the $250,000 prize.

== Holes ==
=== Season 1 ===
The larger-than-life mini-golf course for the first season features 10 supersized themed holes:

- Dutch Courage: Contestants must hit through a small mini-golf-style windmill situated in between two large windmills. The large windmills have four large, quickly rotating blades that can knock the player off the putting surface and cause stroke penalties. The hole lies past the second large windmill, on a slope.
- Caddysmack: The contestants try to hit their first putt closest to the big golf ball. The one closest gets to decide how their next shot will be hit, either by resident golf pro Stephen Curry or a robot voiced by Rob Riggle, with the losing contestant getting the other option. The robot and Curry hit 55-yard pitch shots to a turf-covered empty swimming pool where the hole is located. Caddysmack is the longest hole on the course.
- Arc de Trigolf: Players hit their ball along a large arc to the green, and then must get over a line of small raised platforms in a swimming pool to ring a bell and release a guillotine that will stop their ball from falling into the water.
- Tee'd Off: The loser on the 4-foot putt-off falls into the pool.
- Sweet Spot: The player tees off from a rapidly rotating platform toward another, less rapidly rotating platform where the hole is located. Several prop candies, like giant gumdrops, decorate the hole and act as obstacles.
- Surf or Turf: Contestants hit a ball up a large concave wave ramp 30 feet into the air, launching it backwards over their heads to an island green. If the ball does not land and stay on the green, the contestant must hit the ball across a skinny walkway instead after a one-stroke penalty.
- Slip N' Putt: The contestants must make their way atop an icy hill. The first one to the top gets the better placed ball. Then, they must hit their ball through the legs of the polar bear and slide their way down the hill to the green to complete the hole.
- The Distractor: Contestants must try to sink a 12-foot putt with a distraction.
- Log Roll: Contestants must putt up a hill and then climb it while avoiding rolling logs on rails.
- Mt. Holey Moley: Contestants must hit their ball up the side of a volcano into one of the crevasse holes. If they miss, their ball is placed far away and behind some rocks. If they place it in the holes, they get a better position—the smaller the hole, the better. They must then climb the volcano and zipline over the pool to land on a floating dock to reach the green; falling off the zipline and landing in the water will result in a one-stroke penalty.

=== Season 2 ===
The course for the second season features 17 supersized themed holes (although it was originally reported to feature 18, like a traditional golf course. This fact was made fun of in the season finale, with Rob Riggle asking "Did we run out of money?"):

- Double Dutch Courage: Contestants must hit through two large windmills. Similar to Dutch Courage, the large windmills have five large, quickly rotating blades that can knock the player off the putting surface and cause stroke penalties. The hole lies past the second large windmill, on a slope.
- Putter Ducky: Contestants must putt past two oversized rubber ducks that swing from side to side. Afterwards, the players themselves must avoid the ducks. If a player gets knocked into the water (by a duck), they receive a one-stroke penalty.
- Slip N' Putt: The contestants must make their way atop an icy hill. The first one to the top gets the better placed ball. Then, they must hit their ball through the legs of the polar bear and slide their way down the hill to the green to complete the hole.
- Frankenputt: Players must putt through a series of electrical nodes and Dr. Frankenputt (a disguised Sir Goph)'s lair to the hole. Every stroke a player takes and misses the hole, they receive an electrical shock.
- Buns & Wieners: Players putt across a crevasse in a rotating hot dog bun before attempting to cross a creek filled with "burning coals" by clinging to one of three rotating hot dogs. Falling into the coals results in a one stroke penalty.
- Hole Number Two: Players must putt along a narrow ridge with water on one side and a row of porta-potties on the other, before attempting a 2.5-second sprint across the ridge before the porta-potty doors open and knock them into the water. If they fall into the water, they receive a one stroke penalty.
- Uranus: Similar to Arc de Trigolf, as contestants must putt the ball around the outer ring of Uranus. There is a channel where if the contestants land, could provide a shot at a hole in one. After the contestants putt (if the result is not a hole-in-one), they must traverse 4 planets to get to the green. If they fall in, they receive a stroke penalty.
- Polcano: Similar to Mount Holey Moley, but players zipline onto a narrow totem pole rather than across the entire water hazard. Falling into the water results in a one stroke penalty.
- Putt the Plank: Contestants must first putt across a pirate ship's bow towards a red X. The closer to the red X gets a courtesy chip across the lagoon from pirate captain Long Jon Lovitz, while the other player gets a blindfolded courtesy chip. Then, they must cross the lagoon on the back of a shark to complete the hole, being careful not to fall in and get a penalty stroke.
- Gopher It: Two contestants must first ride on a mechanical gopher for as long as they can. Whoever can ride the gopher the longest will get the better ball placement on the course. The contestants must then put across a course with mechanical gopher heads popping up randomly. The contestant with the better ball placement only has to navigate around 2 gopher heads while the other must deal with a third.
- Dragon's Breath: Contestants wearing fireproof armor must putt the ball through one of three holes underneath a drawbridge in order to lower it and putt the ball in the hole. While the contestants are trying to putt, dragons breathe fire at the contestant.
- Beaver Creek: Players putt across a narrow strip before crossing a ditch via a rapidly rotating log. Falling into the ditch results in a one stroke penalty. Riggle often ridicules the hole for having a drab and empty ditch and for being a relative copy of Buns & Weiners.
- Diving Range: Three contestants first complete a dive of their choice judged by Olympic diver Greg Louganis, actor Steve Guttenberg, and Sir Goph. The contestant with the lowest score is eliminated; that contestant was always a ringer, former collegiate diver Joey Cifelli. (Sir Goph always gave his "score" as a picture, which Course Marshall Joe was left to interpret. Regardless of the object shown, it was always interpreted as a 4.) Of the remaining two contestants, the better score gets the better ball placement. They compete on a hole in which they must shoot past laneline obstacles to reach the hole in the center.
- The Distractor: Contestants must try to sink a 12-foot putt with a distraction.
- Water Hazard: Similar to Surf or Turf, in which players hit a ball over a water hazard via a 30-foot wave before attempting to cross a narrow bridge while being blasted with fire hoses. Falling into the water results in a one stroke penalty.
- Clowning Around: Appeared in the season finale. Each of the players is strapped into a circular apparatus in a standing position. The apparatus is then turned several times to disorient the players, and the players eventually have to putt the magnetized ball upside down to a rectangular green. Any miss gets a whipped-cream pie in the face from one of the clowns accompanying the hole.
- The Tomb of Nefer–Tee–Tee: Stephen Curry's much lauded finale hole, which appeared in the season finale. The hole is "all-or-nothing" hole, and eventually had nothing to do with the schematic shown all during the season. Each player will get one shot to ace the hole per round, and only the person first holing the putt wins the jackpot grand prize of $250,000 and the Jeweled Putter of Nefer-Tee-Tee. The hole is almost 100 feet in length, and contains three parts. After an unassuming tee area, the ball then enters a repurposed spinning disc from Sweet Spot, this time containing three Egyptian-style pyramids and is colored as a desert. Past that is the green, including walls on two sides and a crypt on the third (which opens when the winner is declared, containing the Jeweled Putter). It also contains several small square obstacles, which could also aid the golfer in holing the putt. If no golfer aces the hole after each has had a shot, the process continues until someone does.

=== Season 3 ===
The course for the third season features 14 supersized themed holes and 1 portmanteau hole:

- Agony of Defeat: Contestants must "ski jump" into the water; the player with the longest jump gets the better ball placement. The hole name is presumably a reference to the "agony of defeat" clip of ski jumper Vinko Bogataj from the introduction to ABC's long-running Wide World of Sports series.
- Turfing USA: Players must putt the ball up and through a wave that runs alongside a pool and onto the green on the other side, guided onto the green by a small wall. After that, they must stand on a mechanically driven surfboard in the same pool they putt past and ride it to the other side, standing up to both the sudden jerky movement of the board and water cannons. If they fall in, they incur a stroke penalty.
- Putt-a-Saurus: Both contestants race each other across the ribs of a dinosaur while over a tar (mud) pit; the ribs do not reach the end of the tar pit, so at one point all players will have to jump into the mud. The first player to reach and touch the bone finish line gets the better ball placement. After cleaning themselves off-camera, players putt up a ramp themed like a dinosaur spine and down a channel to the green; there is a small ridge that players must also try to navigate around for better putting positions off the ramp.
- Parcade: Similar to Uranus, players putt their ball up the launch ramp of a pinball machine. Once at the top, the ball falls into one of five channels that are themed after prior holes: Uranus, Dutch Courage (Windmill), Putt Bunyan, Putter Ducky, and The Tomb of Nefer-Tee-Tee; it is currently unknown what happens if the ball fails to reach any one of the five channels. The ball then ends on the green. After putting, each player must cross over a pool by jumping between two pinball flippers that rise up and down. Failing to do so incurs a stroke penalty.
- The Fishing Hole: Similar to Putter Ducky, in which contestants must putt past three oversized fish that swing from side to side. Afterwards, the players themselves must avoid the fish while being showered by a water cannon. If a player gets knocked into the water (by a fish), they receive a one-stroke penalty. As of November 2021, the hole is sponsored by a website promoting fishing.
- Holey Matrimony: Each player puts down the aisle to the green themed like a dance floor, complete with a disco ball in the center of a checkerboard pattern. After that, players run along a quickly moving treadmill "aisle" towards a spinning ring and cake over a pool. They must jump from the treadmill onto the ring and cake to reach the green. Falling into the water incurs a stroke penalty. To add to the theming, each player dresses up in a suit or a dress depending on gender; if two men are playing, both are dressed in suits, and if two women are playing, the women have a choice of a white suit or a dress.
- Ho Ho Hole: A rethemed Christmas version of Polcano, with the totem pole replaced by a candy cane "North Pole". The hole also has an added challenge of putting through fake snow, which hinders the ball from moving as quickly.
- Corn Hole: Similar to Hole Number Two, in which players must putt the ball down a huge piece of corn, and then walking through the same piece of corn. The giant kernels on the corn pop after 3 seconds, and if they get popped off the course into a pool full of foam squares that are designed to resemble popcorn kernels, they receive a one-stroke penalty. The hole itself rests on a slope that is themed to look like a cornhole board. This, Donut Hole, and The Pecker are the only holes in which players do not get wet if they fail.
- Donut Hole: Contestants hit their ball down a ramp covered in "sprinkles," which act as walls that guide the ball down to the green. They must then jump through three swinging donuts to reach the green; if players fall into a multicolored "sprinkle" foam square pit below, they incur a stroke penalty. This, Corn Hole, and The Pecker are the only holes in which the players do not get wet if they fail.
- Dutch Courage En Fuego: Similar to Double Dutch Courage, in which contestants must hit through two large windmills that exhale flames (the flames do not impact the hole, though they do emit smoke which makes it harder to see the blades of the windmills). The large windmills have five large, quickly rotating blades that can knock the player off the putting surface and cause stroke penalties. The hole lies past the second large windmill, on a slope.
- King Parthur's Court: Contestants putt down a channel and over a ramp across the water to a sword, banking their balls off to the hole. After putting, each player mounts on a mechanical horse and jousts with Sir Puttsalot, who tries to knock them off the horse into the water below. If they fall, players incur a stroke penalty.
- The Pecker: Players must putt the ball down a strip of wood to the green, and a channel on the side of the wood strip gives a chance for a hole-in-one. They must then jump onto a bobbing woodpecker head and grab a red feather atop it; if they fail, it is a stroke penalty. This, Donut Hole, and Corn Hole are the only holes in which the players do not get wet if they fail.
- Hole Number Two: Players must putt along a narrow ridge with muddy water on one side and a row of porta-potties on the other, before attempting a 2.5-second sprint across the ridge before the porta-potty doors open and knock them into the mud. If they fall into the mud, they receive a one stroke penalty.
- The Distractor: Contestants must try to sink a 12-foot putt with a distraction.
- ParFishDutch: A portmanteau of the Parcade, The Fishing Hole, and Dutch Courage En Fuego courses in an epic 300-foot-long beast, which appeared in the season finale. In the Parcade area, players putt their ball up the launch ramp of a pinball machine. Once at the top, the ball falls into one of five channels that are themed after prior holes: Uranus, Dutch Courage (Windmill), Putt Bunyan, Putter Ducky, and The Tomb of Nefer-Tee-Tee; it is currently unknown what happens if the ball fails to reach any one of the five channels. The ball then lands on the green before the narrow ridge leading to The Fishing Hole. After putting, each player must cross over a pool by jumping between two pinball flippers that rise up and down, which will lead them to The Fishing Hole. Failing to do so incurs a stroke penalty. In The Fishing Hole section, the contestants then must putt past three oversized fish that swing from side to side, which will lead them to Dutch Courage En Fuego. Afterwards, the players themselves must avoid the fish while being showered by a water cannon. If a player gets knocked into the water (by a fish), they receive a one-stroke penalty. In the Dutch Courage En Fuego portion, the contestants next must hit through two large windmills, which have five large, quickly rotating blades that exhale flames (the flames do not impact the hole, though they do emit smoke which makes it harder to see the blades of the windmills). The large windmills have five large, quickly rotating blades that can knock the player off the putting surface and cause stroke penalties. The hole lies past the second large windmill, on a slope.

=== Season 4 ===
The course for the fourth season features 14 supersized themed holes and 1 mashup hole:

- The Trap–Tee–Ze: Contestants hit their ball over a big curvy ramp to hit it on the other side. If their ball falls in the water, then the player must putt from the Drop Zone. Then they must swing from one trapeze to a Rob Riggle dummy. If they fall in the water, it's a stroke penalty.
- Donut Hole: Contestants hit their ball down a ramp covered in "sprinkles," which act as walls that guide the ball down to the green. They must then jump through three swinging donuts to reach the green; if players fall into a multicolored "sprinkle" foam square pit below, they incur a stroke penalty.
- Hole Number Two: Players must putt along a narrow ridge with muddy water on one side and a row of porta-potties on the other, before attempting a 2.5-second sprint across the ridge before the porta-potty doors open and knock them into the mud. If they fall into the mud, they receive a one stroke penalty.
- Corn Hole: Similar to Hole Number Two, in which players must putt the ball down a huge piece of corn, and then walking through the same piece of corn. The giant kernels on the corn pop after 3 seconds, and if they get popped off the course into a pool full of foam squares that are designed to resemble popcorn kernels, they receive a one-stroke penalty. The hole itself rests on a slope that is themed to look like a cornhole board.
- Dutch Courage En Fuego: Contestants must hit through two large windmills that exhale flames (the flames do not impact the hole, though they do emit smoke which makes it harder to see the blades of the windmills). The large windmills have five large, quickly rotating blades that can knock the player off the putting surface and cause stroke penalties. The hole lies past the second large windmill, on a slope.
- Polecano: This hole from Season 2 returns with a different spelling. Similar to Mount Holey Moley, but players zipline onto a narrow totem pole rather than across the entire water hazard. Falling into the water results in a one stroke penalty.
- Full Mooney: Players must putt the ball over a ramp and onto the green on the other side. After putting, they must stand atop a mechanically driven moon and trot backwards to maintain their balance. If they splash down into the water, they incur a one stroke penalty.
- Holeywood: Players will start by running on a moving red carpet and try to land on one of four stars. The better the star, the ball position. If they don't land on the one of four stars, then the player would putt from the Riggle Drop Zone. Then players putt it out.
- The Fishing Hole: Contestants must putt past three oversized fish that swing from side to side. Afterwards, the players themselves must avoid the fish while being showered by a water cannon. If a player gets knocked into the water (by a fish), they receive a one-stroke penalty.
- Big Foot Wedge: Contestants hit their ball down a ramp. After putting, they must then swing on the big foot above the pit and hop onto a large golf ball. If they don't stay on the ball, players incur a stroke penalty.
- The Pecker: Players must putt the ball down a strip of wood to the green, and a channel on the side of the wood strip gives a chance for a hole-in-one. They must then jump onto a bobbing woodpecker head and grab a red feather atop it; if they fail, it is a stroke penalty. This, Donut Hole, and Corn Hole are the only holes in which the players do not get wet if they fail.
- King Parthur's Court: Contestants putt down a channel and over a ramp across the water to a sword, banking their balls off to the hole. After putting, each player mounts on a mechanical horse and jousts with Sir Puttsalot, who tries to knock them off the horse into the water below. If they fall, players incur a stroke penalty.
- The Distractor: Contestants must try to sink a 12-foot putt with a distraction.
- Parcade: Appeared in the season finale, where players putt their ball up the launch ramp of a pinball machine. Once at the top, the ball falls into one of five channels that are themed after prior holes: Uranus, Dutch Courage (Windmill), Putt Bunyan, Putter Ducky, and The Tomb of Nefer-Tee-Tee; it is currently unknown what happens if the ball fails to reach any one of the five channels. The ball then ends on the green. After putting, each player must cross over a pool by jumping between two pinball flippers that rise up and down. Failing to do so incurs a stroke penalty.
- The Holeywood Distractor: A Holeywood version of The Distractor, which appeared in the season finale. Contestants must attempt to ace a lengthy putt over a ramp with a singing Jeannie Mai as the distraction. Muppet Miss Piggy was originally going to be present, only to have her trapped and locked alone in her trailer.

== Episodes ==
=== Series overview ===
Season	Title	Episodes	Originally released	
Season	Title	Episodes	First released	Last released
1	Holey Moley	10	June 20, 2019	August 22, 2019
2	Holey Moley II: The Sequel	13	May 21, 2020	September 10, 2020
3	Holey Moley 3D in 2D	10	June 17, 2021	September 23, 2021
4	Holey Moley Fore-Ever	10	May 3, 2022	July 12, 2022

=== Season 1 (2019) ===
No. overall	No. in season	Title	Original release date	Prod. code	U.S. viewers (millions)	Rating/share (18–49)
1	1	"Putt Up or Shut Up"	June 20, 2019	104	4.87	1.0/6
Holes featured are Dutch Courage, Slip N' Putt, Caddy Smack, Arc de Trigolf, Sweet Spot, Surf or Turf, Log Roll, Tee'd Off, The Distractor, and Mt. Holey Moley. Holly Fine is declared the winner.
2	2	"The Thunderdome of Mini Golf"	June 27, 2019	109	4.31	0.9/5
Holes featured are Slip N' Putt, Arc de Trigolf, Sweet Spot, Dutch Courage, Slip N' Putt, Caddy Smack, The Distractor, Log Roll, Tee'd Off, and Mt. Holey Moley. Jimmy Ruiz is declared the winner.
3	3	"Leave the Golf to the Robots"	July 11, 2019	107	3.96	0.9/5
Holes featured are Surf or Turf, Slip N' Putt, Arc de Trigolf, Sweet Spot, Tee'd Off, Caddy Smack, The Distractor, Log Roll, Tee'd Off, and Mt. Holey Moley. Nick Brucker is declared the winner.
4	4	"The Greatest Show on Turf"	July 18, 2019	105	3.16	0.8/4
Holes featured are Arc de Trigolf, Caddy Smack, Dutch Courage, Surf or Turf, Sweet Spot, Slip N' Putt, Log Roll, The Distractor, Tee'd Off, and Mt. Holey Moley. Mick Cullen is declared the winner.
5	5	"An Outbreak of Ginger Fever"	July 25, 2019	102	3.28	0.7/4
Holes featured are Tee'd Off, Dutch Courage, Caddy Smack, Arc de Trigolf, Slip N' Putt, Surf or Turf, The Distractor, Log Roll, Tee'd Off, and Mt. Holey Moley. Dianne Cullen is declared the winner.
6	6	"Never Count Out the Beard"	August 1, 2019	106	3.19	0.8/4
Holes featured are Surf or Turf, Tee'd Off, Dutch Courage, Caddy Smack, Sweet Spot, Dutch Courage, The Distractor, Log Roll, Tee'd Off, and Mt. Holey Moley. Colin McCarthy is declared the winner.
7	7	"It's Like Playing Golf in Space"	August 8, 2019	110	2.29	0.8/3
Holes featured are Dutch Courage, Caddy Smack, Surf or Turf, Tee'd Off, Slip N' Putt, Sweet Spot, The Distractor, Tee'd Off, Log Roll, and Mt. Holey Moley. Jeffrey Barber is declared the winner.
8	8	"Everyone Can Be Terrible!"	August 15, 2019	108	2.39	0.5/3
Holes featured are Arc de Trigolf, Dutch Courage, Surf or Turf, Arc de Trigolf, Slip N' Putt, Caddy Smack, The Distractor, Log Roll, Tee'd Off, and Mt. Holey Moley. Mollie Peterson is declared the winner.
9	9	"Mother-Putter!"	August 22, 2019	103	2.65	0.6/3
Holes featured are Dutch Courage, Tee'd Off, Slip N' Putt, Arc De Trigolf, Dutch Courage, Caddy Smack, Log Roll, The Distractor, Tee'd Off, and Mt. Holey Moley. Malcolm Kelner is declared the winner.
10	10	"Power of the Fanny Pack"	August 22, 2019	101	2.06	0.5/3
Holes featured are Arc De Trigolf, Slip N' Putt, Dutch Courage, Arc De Trigolf, Surf or Turf, Caddy Smack, Log Roll, Tee'd Off, The Distractor, and Mt. Holey Moley. Steve Kristof is declared the winner.

=== Season 2 (2020) ===
No. overall	No. in season	Title	Original release date	Prod. code	U.S. viewers (millions)	Rating/share (18–49)
Holey Moley II: The Sequel
11	1	"Literally Jumping the Shark (FKA No Ifs, Ands, Just Putts)"	May 21, 2020	212	4.44	0.8/5
Holes featured are Dragon's Breath, Polcano, Beaver Creek, Putt the Plank, Double Dutch Courage, Hole Number Two, and Frankenputt. Erik Gustafson is declared the winner.
12	2	"That's One for the Scrapbooks!"	May 28, 2020	201	3.99	0.8/5
Holes featured are Hole Number Two, Putter Ducky, Buns & Wieners, Diving Range, The Distractor, Water Hazard, and Slip N' Putt. Ray Nugent is declared the winner.
13	3	"That Man Knows How to Ride a Weiner"	June 4, 2020	206	3.89	0.7/4
Holes featured are Water Hazard, Gopher It, Diving Range, Buns & Wieners, Hole Number Two, Double Dutch Courage, and Frankenputt. Chris Morales is declared the winner.
14	4	"I Think We Just Made History on Uranus"	June 11, 2020	202	4.13	0.7/5
Holes featured are Putter Ducky, The Distractor, Water Hazard, Hole Number Two, Slip N' Putt, Gopher It, and Uranus. Mei Brennan is declared the winner.
15	5	"Where the Herd At?!"	June 18, 2020	209	3.81	0.7/5
Holes featured are Slip N' Putt, Water Hazard, The Distractor, Gopher It, Putt The Plank, Polcano, and Double Dutch Courage. Tanner Beard is declared the winner.
16	6	"Don't Attempt This in Clogs"	June 25, 2020	211	3.88	0.7/5
Holes featured are Uranus, Putt The Plank, Polcano, Beaver Creek, Dragon's Breath, Double Dutch Courage, and Hole Number Two. Chelsea Kinard is declared the winner.
17	7	"Love at First Stroke"	July 9, 2020	204	3.70	0.6/5
Holes featured are Polcano, Hole Number Two, Uranus, Putter Ducky, Dragon's Breath, Beaver Creek, and Double Dutch Courage. Alexandra Scott is declared the winner.
18	8	"Under Paargh!"	July 16, 2020	207	3.41	0.5/4
Holes featured are Putt The Plank, Uranus, Diving Range, Buns & Wieners, Dragon's Breath, The Distractor, and Double Dutch Courage. Noor Jehangir is declared the winner.
19	9	"Porta Party"	July 30, 2020	205	2.91	0.5/4
Holes featured are The Distractor, Buns & Wieners, Diving Range, Water Hazard, Double Dutch Courage, Dragon's Breath, and Hole Number Two. David Koonvirarak is declared the winner.
20	10	"It's Apple Sauce Time!"	August 6, 2020	208	2.94	0.5/4
Holes featured are Polcano, Beaver Creek, Diving Range, Buns & Wieners, Double Dutch Courage, Dragon's Breath, and Hole Number Two. Mallory Sestak is declared the winner.
21	11	"You Just Got a Free Bath"	August 13, 2020	203	3.37	0.6/4
Holes featured are Hole Number Two, Slip N' Putt, Putter Ducky, Gopher It, Putt the Plank, Uranus, and Dragon's Breath. Connie Amarel is declared the winner.
22	12	"Double Dutch Riggle"	September 3, 2020	210	3.15	0.5/4
Holes featured are Uranus, Slip N' Putt, The Distractor, Putt the Plank, Polcano, Gopher It, and Double Dutch Courage. Ashley Lewis is declared the winner.
23	13	"A Finale of Epic Proportions"	September 10, 2020	213	2.98	0.5/3
Holes featured are Hole Number Two, Clowning Around, The Distractor, Frankenputt, and The Tomb of Nefer–Tee–Tee. Tanner Beard is declared the winner.

=== Specials (2020) ===
No.	Title	Original release date	Prod. code	U.S. viewers (millions)	Rating/share (18–49)
S1	"Holey Moley II: The Sequel: The Special: Unhinged, Part One"	September 10, 2020	214	1.76	0.3/2
S2	"Holey Moley II: The Sequel: The Special: Unhinged, Part Deux"	September 17, 2020	215	1.93	0.4/2

=== Season 3 (2021) ===
No. overall	No. in season	Title	Original release date	Prod. code	U.S. viewers (millions)	Rating/share (18–49)
Holey Moley 3D in 2D
24	1	"Holey Moley Goes Pro!"	June 17, 2021	303	3.16	0.5/4
Holes featured are Agony of Defeat, Corn Hole, Ho Ho Hole, Turfing USA, Dutch Courage En Fuego, Hole Number Two, and The Pecker. Jose Alvarez is declared the winner.
25	2	"Silent Night, Holey Night"	June 17, 2021	309	2.67	0.5/4
Holes featured are Corn Hole, Ho Ho Hole, Holey Matrimony, The Fishing Hole, King Parthur's Court, Dutch Courage En Fuego, and The Pecker. Blake Sledge is declared the winner.
26	3	"No Apparent Fear of Death"	June 24, 2021	302	2.66	0.5/4
Holes featured are Holey Matrimony, Agony of Defeat, Turfing USA, The Fishing Hole, Ho Ho Hole, Corn Hole, and King Parthur's Court. Rachel Lentsch is declared the winner.
27	4	"Earth, Wind, Fire, Donuts"	July 1, 2021	308	2.50	0.4/3
Holes featured are Putt-A-Saurus, Parcade, Ho Ho Hole, Donut Hole, Dutch Courage En Fuego, King Parthur's Court, and Hole Number Two. David Biggy is declared the winner.
28	5	"Pretty Tee-rrific"	July 15, 2021	305	2.34	0.4/3
Holes featured are Parcade, Putt-A-Saurus, The Fishing Hole, Holey Matrimony, King Parthur's Court, Hole Number Two, and The Distractor. Todd Engel is declared the winner.
29	6	"Another One Bites the Donut"	July 22, 2021	306	2.77	0.4/4
Holes featured are Corn Hole, Putt-A-Saurus, The Fishing Hole, Parcade, Dutch Courage En Fuego, Donut Hole, and King Parthur's Court. Jack Bennett is declared the winner.
30	7	"These Boots Are Made for Putting"	August 12, 2021	301	2.71	0.4/3
Holes featured are Agony of Defeat, Parcade, Turfing USA, Putt-A-Saurus, Holey Matrimony, The Fishing Hole, and Ho Ho Hole. Cindy Wu is declared the winner.
31	8	"It's Family Night!"	August 19, 2021	307	2.73	0.4/3
Holes featured are Parcade, Putt-A-Saurus, Dutch Courage En Fuego, Donut Hole, Holey Matrimony, Hole Number Two, and The Pecker. Ben Rogers is declared the winner.
32	9	"The Classic Dipsey-Doodle"	September 9, 2021	304	2.39	0.4/2
Holes featured are Agony of Defeat, Dutch Courage En Fuego, Donut Hole, Turfing USA, King Parthur's Court, Hole Number Two, and The Distractor. Tyler Gattoni is declared the winner.
33	10	"The Turducken of Golf"	September 23, 2021	310	2.49	0.4/3
Holes featured are Hole Number Two, The Pecker, Corn Hole, The Fishing Hole, and ParFishDutch. Rachel Lentsch is declared the winner.

=== Season 4 (2022) ===
No. overall	No. in season	Title	Original release date	Prod. code	U.S. viewers (millions)	Rating/share (18–49)
Holey Moley Fore-Ever
34	1	"Holey Moley, It's the Muppets!"	May 3, 2022	403	2.82	0.4/4
Holes featured are The Trap–Tee–Ze, Corn Hole, Donut Hole, Dutch Courage En Fuego, Polecano, Full Mooney, and Holeywood. Jaime Jacob is declared the winner.
35	2	"You're Gonna Need a Lawyer"	May 10, 2022	404	2.44	0.4/3
Holes featured are The Fishing Hole, Polecano, Hole Number Two, Dutch Courage En Fuego, Holeywood, Full Mooney, and Big Foot Wedge. Nate Kennelly is declared the winner.
36	3	"Bear, Bear, BEAR!"	May 17, 2022	409	2.59	0.4/3
Holes featured are Corn Hole, The Distractor, The Pecker, The Trap–Tee–Ze, Polecano, Full Mooney, and Holeywood. Katie Kearney is declared the winner.
37	4	"Pepe's Ransom Plan Continues"	May 24, 2022	408	2.83	0.5/4
Holes featured are Polecano, The Trap-Tee-Ze, Hole Number Two, The Pecker, The Fishing Hole, Full Mooney, and Holeywood. Kathy Valyo is declared the winner.
38	5	"Can You Feel the Urge?"	May 31, 2022	406	2.47	0.4/4
Holes featured are The Trap–Tee–Ze, King Parthur's Court, The Pecker, Hole Number Two, Corn Hole, Polecano, and The Fishing Hole. Rick Anderson is declared the winner.
39	6	"Is That Iron Man?"	June 7, 2022	402	2.40	0.4/4
Holes featured are Dutch Courage En Fuego, The Distractor, Donut Hole, The Pecker, The Trap–Tee–Ze, Corn Hole, and Polecano. Dylan Bohlke is declared the winner.
40	7	"Night of Music!"	June 14, 2022	405	2.42	0.4/4
Holes featured are Polecano, Hole Number Two, The Pecker, The Distractor, Full Mooney, Holeywood, and Big Foot Wedge. Tyler Kairey is declared the winner.
41	8	"No Touchy-Touchy"	June 21, 2022	407	2.12	0.4/4
Holes featured are The Fishing Hole, Polecano, The Distractor, Hole Number Two, The Pecker, Holeywood, and Big Foot Wedge. Will Keys is declared the winner.
42	9	"Is This Guy Weird?"	July 5, 2022	401	2.33	0.4/4
Holes featured are Dutch Courage En Fuego, King Parthur's Court, Donut Hole, Hole Number Two, The Distractor, The Pecker, and The Trap–Tee–Ze. Erika Shavers is declared the winner.
43	10	"The Greatest Game"	July 12, 2022	410	2.34	0.4/4
Holes featured are Fully Mooney, Holeywood, Big Foot Wedge, Parcade, and Holeywood Distractor. Kathy Valyo is declared the winner.

== Release ==
The first season premiered on June 20, 2019, and consisted of 10 episodes. Global acquired the broadcast rights for Canada, and began simulcasting the series alongside the US broadcast on June 27, 2019. The series moved to CTV in Canada starting with season three.

== Reception ==
=== Critical response ===
The review aggregator website Rotten Tomatoes reported a 92% approval rating for the first season, based on 12 reviews, with an average rating of 6/10. The website's consensus reads, "A fun, family-friendly show that benefits greatly from its hyperbolic hosts, Holey Moley is a delightful summer diversion." The second season has a 100% approval rating on Rotten Tomatoes, based on 5 reviews.

=== Ratings ===
==== Overview ====
Viewership and ratings per season of Holey Moley
Season	Timeslot (ET)	Episodes	First aired		Last aired		TV season	Avg. viewers (millions)	Avg. 18–49 rating
Season	Timeslot (ET)	Episodes	Date	Viewers (millions)	Date	Viewers (millions)	TV season	Avg. viewers (millions)	Avg. 18–49 rating
1	Thursday 8:00 pm	10	June 20, 2019	4.87	August 22, 2019	2.06	2018–19	3.22	0.68
2	Thursday 9:00 pm (1–3); Thursday 8:00 pm (4–13)	13	May 21, 2020	4.44	September 10, 2020	2.98	2019–20	3.35	0.60
3	Thursday 9:00 pm (2–5); Thursday 8:00 pm (1, 6–10)	10	June 17, 2021	3.16	September 23, 2021	2.49	2020–21	2.64	0.42
4	Tuesday 8:00 pm	10	May 3, 2022	2.82	July 12, 2022	2.34	2021–22	2.47	0.39

==== Season 1 ====
Viewership and ratings per episode of Holey Moley
No.	Title	Air date	Rating/share (18–49)	Viewers (millions)	DVR (18–49)	DVR viewers (millions)	Total (18–49)	Total viewers (millions)
1	"Putt Up or Shut Up"	June 20, 2019	1.0/6	4.87	0.4	1.04	1.4	5.91
2	"The Thunderdome of Mini Golf"	June 27, 2019	0.9/5	4.31	0.2	0.57	1.1	4.88
3	"Leave the Golf to the Robots"	July 11, 2019	0.9/5	3.96	0.2	0.59	1.0	4.55
4	"The Greatest Show on Turf"	July 18, 2019	0.8/4	3.16	0.1	0.49	0.9	3.65
5	"An Outbreak of Ginger Fever"	July 25, 2019	0.7/4	3.28	0.2	0.51	0.9	3.80
6	"Never Count Out the Beard"	August 1, 2019	0.8/4	3.19	0.2	0.43	0.9	3.62
7	"It's Like Playing Golf in Space"	August 8, 2019	0.8/3	2.29	0.2	0.48	0.9	3.81
8	"Everyone Can Be Terrible!"	August 15, 2019	0.5/3	2.39	0.1	0.37	0.6	2.75
9	"Mother-Putter!"	August 22, 2019	0.6/3	2.65	0.1	0.31	0.8	2.84
10	"Power of the Fanny Pack"	August 22, 2019	0.5/3	2.06	0.1	0.35	0.8	2.39

==== Season 2 ====
Viewership and ratings per episode of Holey Moley
No.	Title	Air date	Rating/share (18–49)	Viewers (millions)	DVR (18–49)	DVR viewers (millions)	Total (18–49)	Total viewers (millions)
1	"Literally Jumping the Shark"	May 21, 2020	0.8/5	4.44	0.2	0.78	1.0	5.22
2	"That's One for the Scrapbooks!"	May 28, 2020	0.8/5	3.99	0.2	0.88	1.0	4.88
3	"That Man Knows How to Ride a Weiner"	June 4, 2020	0.7/4	3.89	0.2	0.78	0.9	4.61
4	"I Think We Just Made History on Uranus"	June 11, 2020	0.7/5	4.13	0.2	0.69	0.9	4.81
5	"Where the Herd At?!"	June 18, 2020	0.7/5	3.81	0.2	0.67	0.9	4.48
6	"Don't Attempt This in Clogs"	June 25, 2020	0.7/5	3.88	0.1	0.57	0.8	4.45
7	"Love at First Stroke"	July 9, 2020	0.6/5	3.70	0.2	0.63	0.8	4.33
8	"Under Paargh!"	July 16, 2020	0.5/4	3.41	0.2	0.57	0.7	3.98
9	"Porta Party"	July 30, 2020	0.5/4	2.91	0.2	0.63	0.7	3.53
10	"It's Apple Sauce Time!"	August 6, 2020	0.5/4	2.94	0.2	0.60	0.7	3.54
11	"You Just Got a Free Bath"	August 13, 2020	0.6/4	3.37	0.1	0.48	0.8	3.85
12	"Double Dutch Riggle"	September 3, 2020	0.5/4	3.15	0.2	0.53	0.7	3.68
13	"A Finale of Epic Proportions"	September 10, 2020	0.5/3	2.98	0.2	0.52	0.6	3.51

==== Season 3 ====
Viewership and ratings per episode of Holey Moley
No.	Title	Air date	Rating/share (18–49)	Viewers (millions)	DVR (18–49)	DVR viewers (millions)	Total (18–49)	Total viewers (millions)
1	"Holey Moley Goes Pro!"	June 17, 2021	0.5/4	3.16	0.2	0.61	0.7	3.77
2	"Silent Night, Holey Night"	June 17, 2021	0.5/4	2.67	0.1	0.58	0.6	3.26
3	"No Apparent Fear of Death"	June 24, 2021	0.5/4	2.66	0.1	0.52	0.6	3.18
4	"Earth, Wind, Fire, Donuts"	July 1, 2021	0.4/3	2.50	0.1	0.58	0.5	3.08
5	"Pretty Tee-rrific"	July 15, 2021	0.4/3	2.34	0.1	0.69	0.5	3.03
6	"Another One Bites The Donut"	July 22, 2021	0.4/4	2.77	0.1	0.36	0.5	3.13
7	"These Boots Are Made For Putting"	August 12, 2021	0.4/3	2.71	0.1	0.46	0.5	3.16
8	"It's Family Night!"	August 19, 2021	0.4/3	2.73	0.1	0.44	0.5	3.17
9	"The Classic Dipsey-Doodle"	September 9, 2021	0.4/2	2.39	—N/a	—N/a	—N/a	—N/a
10	"The Turducken of Golf"	September 23, 2021	0.4/3	2.49	0.1	0.40	0.5	2.89 (Note: Live+7 ratings were not available, so Live+3 ratings have been used instead.)

==== Season 4 ====
Viewership and ratings per episode of Holey Moley
No.	Title	Air date	Rating/share (18–49)	Viewers (millions)
1	"Holey Moley, it's the Muppets!"	May 3, 2022	0.4/4	2.82
2	"You're Gonna Need a Lawyer"	May 10, 2022	0.4/3	2.44
3	"Bear, Bear, BEAR!"	May 17, 2022	0.4/3	2.59
4	"Pepe's Ransom Plan Continues"	May 24, 2022	0.5/4	2.83
5	"Can You Feel The Urge?"	May 31, 2022	0.4/4	2.47
6	"Is That Iron Man?"	June 7, 2022	0.4/4	2.40
7	"Night of Music!"	June 14, 2022	0.4/4	2.42
8	"No Touchy-Touchy"	June 21, 2022	0.4/4	2.12
9	"Is This Guy Weird?"	July 5, 2022	0.4/4	2.33
10	"The Greatest Game"	July 12, 2022	0.4/4	2.34

=== Accolades ===
Year	Award	Category	Nominee(s)	Result	Ref.
2019	Rose d'Or	Studio Entertainment	Holey Moley	Nominated	
2020	Realscreen Awards	Best New Format	Holey Moley	Won	
2020	C21 Media International Format Awards	Best Factual Format	Holey Moley	Won	
2020	TCA Awards	Outstanding Achievement in Reality Programming	Holey Moley	Nominated	

== International versions ==
In October 2019, Australia's Seven Network announced it would be adapting the series for Australian audiences, produced by Eureka Productions. Initially slated for an August 2020 broadcast, the show started filming using an expanded version of the US course in California, but abandoned production in March 2020 due to the COVID-19 pandemic. The show later restarted filming on a set built in Australia in October 2020, with a new broadcast date set for early 2021. Greg Norman stars as the resident golf pro, alongside commentators Rob Riggle (reprising his role from the US version) and Matt Shirvington, along with host and sideline correspondent Sonia Kruger. The show premiered on February 1, 2021.

The Australian Holey Moley set was intended to be reused for potential international adaptations from Germany, the UK and France; however due to the pandemic and travel restrictions this did not eventuate before Eureka's contract for the site expired in July 2023. In 2026, these projects were revived with ITV announcing a 4-episode run hosted by Ant & Dec in April 2026, followed by TF1 announcing a French adaptation and Prime Video announcing a German adaptation in June 2026. These will be filmed at a new dedicated international production hub in Portugal.
