= Stacks of Cash =

International television game show format

- Genre: Game show
- Countries of origin: Australia; Portugal
- Original language: English

Production
- Production company: Eureka Productions

Original release
- Release: 2026

Stacks of Cash is an international television game show format developed by Eureka Productions and Seven Network (Operations) Limited. The format is produced by Australian production company Eureka and distributed internationally by Fremantle. It combines general knowledge questions with a physical stacking challenge in which contestants use a large mechanical claw to construct an increasingly unstable tower of shapes representing cash prizes.

The format made its international television debut in Portugal in 2026, where it was broadcast by TVI under the title Linha D'Ouro. In October 2026, Fremantle announced commissions for American and Australian adaptations, to be broadcast by CBS and the Seven Network, respectively.

== Format ==
Stacks of Cash combines a general knowledge quiz with a physical stacking game. Contestants answer questions to win oversized shapes carrying monetary values. They then use a large mechanical claw to position the shapes and construct a tower.

The programme features more than 30 different shapes, including circles, teddy bears and top hats. The variety of shapes makes the construction increasingly difficult as the tower grows. Contestants must balance each new piece while attempting to increase the value of their winnings.

The tower becomes progressively more unstable as additional shapes are added. If it collapses, the contestant is eliminated. The format combines quiz-based competition with physical coordination and risk management.

== Production ==
The format was developed by Eureka Studios Group Pty Ltd and Seven Network (Operations) Limited. Eureka is responsible for producing the format, while Fremantle represents it internationally and oversees its global distribution.

A dedicated production hub for Stacks of Cash was established in Portugal. The Portuguese, American and Australian adaptations were filmed at the facility, allowing different versions of the programme to share production infrastructure and resources.

The executive producers named in Fremantle's announcement were Chris Culvenor, Paul Franklin, Rikkie Proost, Sonya Wilkes, David Tibballs, Ves D'Elia and Ed Egan.

== International versions ==
As of October 2026, three national versions of Stacks of Cash had been announced or broadcast.

International versions of Stacks of Cash
Country	Local title	Broadcaster	Presenter	Episodes	Episode length	Status
Portugal	Linha D'Ouro	TVI	Cláudio Ramos	7	90 minutes	Broadcast in 2026
United States	Stacks of Cash	CBS	Mike O'Malley	10	60 minutes	Premieres January 6, 2027
Australia	Stacks of Cash	Seven Network	Matt Shirvington	6	60 minutes	2027

=== Portugal ===
The Portuguese adaptation, titled Linha D'Ouro, was broadcast by TVI in 2026 and presented by Cláudio Ramos. The first season consisted of seven episodes, each approximately 90 minutes long.

The programme's launch episode ranked first in its timeslot across total viewers, the commercial target audience and young adults, according to Fremantle. Multiple episodes also ranked as TVI's most-watched programme of the day.

The Portuguese version was one of the three national adaptations filmed at the dedicated production hub in Portugal.

=== United States ===
In October 2026, CBS commissioned a ten-episode American adaptation of Stacks of Cash. Each episode was commissioned for a duration of 60 minutes, with actor Mike O'Malley announced as the presenter. O'Malley had previously received an Emmy Award nomination.

The American version was filmed at the production hub in Portugal alongside the Portuguese and Australian adaptations.

=== Australia ===
The Seven Network commissioned a six-episode Australian adaptation of Stacks of Cash in 2026. The episodes were commissioned for a duration of 60 minutes each. In October 2026, the series was officially confirmed along with the announcement of host Matt Shirvington.

The Australian adaptation was also scheduled to be filmed at the production hub in Portugal.

== International distribution ==
Fremantle announced the international expansion of Stacks of Cash on 8 October 2026, confirming the American and Australian commissions following the format's Portuguese debut.

The format was presented as part of Fremantle's international entertainment slate at MIPCOM in Cannes in October 2026. Its distribution strategy included the use of a shared production facility in Portugal to accommodate multiple national adaptations.
