= Code: 9 =

- Genre: Reality
- Created by: Mark Herwick
- Presented by: Wes Dening
- Opening theme: "Code 9"
- Ending theme: "Intrulude"
- Countries of origin: Australia; United States
- Original language: English
- No. of seasons: 1
- No. of episodes: 7

Production
- Executive producers: Mark Herwick; Douglas Ross; Kathleen French; Gregory Stewart; Alex Baskin
- Production companies: Evolution Media; Mark Herwick Productions

Original release
- Network: Disney Channel
- Release: July 26 – December 5, 2012

Code: 9 is a hidden camera/reality television series that premiered on July 26, 2012 on Disney Channel. It is hosted by In the Qube star Wes Dening. The series involves a family pulling a prank with their unsuspecting parents. The entire group has to plan and execute the prank with one family member going undercover to pull the prank off. The series was not renewed for a second season, and was cancelled after only one season, despite encouraging opening ratings.

== Episodes ==
No.	Title	Original release date	Prod. code	US viewers (millions)
1	"Golf and Gas (part 1)"	July 26, 2012	103	2.74
2	"Golf and Gas (part 2)"	November 19, 2012	104	2.74
3	"Steal of a Deal"	November 20, 2012	105	2.28
4	"Hockey Havoc"	November 21, 2012	102	3.41
A father is pranked into thinking that he purposely tried to destroy a benefit at a hockey game.
5	"Snow Globe Surprise"	November 22, 2012	101	2.13
A mom who is obsessed with snow globes is made to think she destroyed a display at a snowglobe store by her two children, husband and host Wes.
6	"Serenity Yoga"	November 23, 2012	106	2.39
A yoga-loving mother is pranked by her children, husband and Wes that she ruined a yoga format at a new relaxation center.
7	"Charity Shoe Soak"	December 5, 2012	107	1.82
A mother who loves shoes is lured to a fake auction that is auctioning off shoes worn by celebrities, but is tricked into thinking she ruined Carrie Underwood's childhood piano.

== Broadcast ==
The series originally aired from July 26, 2012 to December 5, 2012 on Disney Channel and from November 19, 2012 to December 5, 2012 on Disney XD. It premiered on November 10, 2012 on Disney Channel (Australia and New Zealand), on January 4, 2013 on Disney Channel (Southeast Asia), and on January 12, 2013 on Disney Channel (UK and Ireland). The series was going to air on Family Channel but it was moved to Disney XD (Canada) on January 12, 2013.
