= Parental Guidance (Australian TV series) =

Australian parenting reality TV series

- Also known as: The Parent Jury
- Genre: Reality television
- Created by: Chris Culvenor
- Directed by: Olivia Peniston-Bird
- Presented by: Ally Langdon; Justin Coulson
- Country of origin: Australia
- Original language: English
- No. of seasons: 3
- No. of episodes: 17

Production
- Executive producer: Vanessa Oxlad
- Production location: Sydney
- Camera setup: Multi-camera
- Running time: 59–77 minutes
- Production company: Eureka Productions

Original release
- Network: Nine Network
- Release: 1 November 2021 – present

Parental Guidance is an Australian parenting reality series hosted by Ally Langdon and parenting expert Dr Justin Coulson, which premiered on the Nine Network on 1 November 2021.

== Format ==
The series features several different families each having different parenting styles. In each episode, the participants compete in several parenting challenges to determine which is the best parenting style.

In the first season of the series, there are ten families who have different styles. In the second season, there are 12 parents, which go through the parenting challenges in groups of 4.

== Production ==
The series is produced by Eureka Productions and was created by Chris Culvenor. It was originally announced at Nine Entertainment's 2021 upfront on 16 September 2020 to be titled The Parent Jury with Supernanny host Jo Frost. However, due to restrictions during the COVID-19 pandemic, Frost was unable to travel for filming and the series proceeded without her, with the series being retitled to Parental Guidance.

Auditions for a second season were opened in January 2022, which was renewed in September 2022 and debuted on 5 June 2023. It aired throughout June 2023.

Auditions for a third season in 2025 were opened in October 2024, after it was announced in September 2023 that the series would possibly return for a third season in 2024. The third season will premiere on 30 June 2025 – however, with fewer episodes.

== Series details ==
Season	Episodes	No. of families	Originally aired	
Season	Episodes	No. of families	Season premiere	Season finale
1	9	10	1 November 2021	16 November 2021
2	7	12	5 June 2023	20 June 2023
3	4	8	30 June 2025	21 July 2025

=== Families ===
==== Season 1 ====
Family	No. of children	Parenting style	Hometown	Group
Andrew & Miriam	3	Strict	NSW	A
Liadhan & Richard	5	Nature	SA	A
Lara & Andrew	2	Attachment	Victoria	A
Brett & Tony	4	Routine	Victoria	A
Yann & Donna	1	French	NSW	A
Kevin & Debbie	2	Tiger	NSW	B
Deb	6	Home School	Queensland	B
Rachel & Sam	2	Helicopter	Queensland	B
Penny & Daniel	3	Free Range	NSW	B
Rob & Sioux	2	Disciplined	SA	B

==== Season 2 ====
Family	No. of children	Parenting style	Hometown
Amy & John	3	Road school parenting	Echuca
Kat & Jonathon	2	Influencer parenting	Gold Coast
Larissa & Marcus	4	Gentle parenting	Adelaide
Sammy & Jason	4	Lighthouse parenting	Gold Coast
Tency & David	3	Outback parenting	Mareeba
Kat	2	Honest parenting	Adelaide
Kajal & Deepak	2	Spiritual parenting	Sydney
Sarah & Shane	3	Stage parenting	Sydney
Mark & Leanne	6	Team parenting	Sydney
Philippa & Chris	3	Slow style parenting	Cairns
Kim & Nick	1	American parenting	Brisbane
Melody & Michael	3	Unstructured parenting	Brisbane

==== Season 3 ====
Family	No. of children	Parenting style	Hometown
Hassan & Amanda	5	Hard Way	Sydney
Nathan & Joanne	2	Traditional	Gold Coast
John & Courtney	3	Pro-tech	Newcastle
Marc & Amy	3	Active	Gold Coast
Mark & Tammy	4	Up Front	Melbourne
Nick & Sofia	2	Positivity	Wollongong
Sean & Elvie	2	Authoritative	Perth
Josh & Cassie	5	Life School	Full Time Caravanners

== International versions ==
Country	Local name	Network	Presenter(s)	Airdate
United States	The Parent Test	American Broadcasting Company	Ali Wentworth; Adolph Brown	15 December 2022

== Ratings ==
=== Season 1 (2021) ===
No. in series	No. in season	Original airdate	Viewers
1	1	1 November 2021	629,000
2	2	2 November 2021	547,000
3	3	3 November 2021	536,000
4	4	8 November 2021	604,000
5	5	9 November 2021	520,000
6	6	10 November 2021	517,000
7	7	14 November 2021	487,000
8	8	15 November 2021	481,000
9	9	16 November 2021	478,000

=== Season 2 (2023) ===
No. in series	No. in season	Original airdate	Viewers
10	1	5 June 2023	511,000
11	2	6 June 2023	433,000
12	3	12 June 2023	445,000
13	4	13 June 2023	420,000
14	5	18 June 2023	375,000
15	6	19 June 2023	398,000
16	7	20 June 2023	411,000

=== Season 3 (2025) ===
No. in series	No. in season	Episode title	Original airdate	Viewers
17	1	"Screen Time"	30 June 2025	729,000
18	2	"Peer Pressure"	7 July 2025	671,000
19	3	"Body Positivity"	14 July 2025	640,000
20	4	"Mental Health"	21 July 2025	633,000

== Reception ==
Bridget McManus of The Age said, "Despite the conflict and the competition format, Coulson insists Parental Guidance is not designed to judge or shame."
