= Dating Around =

American reality dating television series

- Genre: Reality; Dating
- Created by: Chris Culvenor
- Directed by: James Adolphus; Wylda Bayron
- Country of origin: United States
- Original language: English
- No. of seasons: 2
- No. of episodes: 12

Production
- Executive producers: Chris Culvenor; Paul Franklin; Alycia Rossiter
- Cinematography: James Adolphus
- Running time: 24–29 minutes
- Production company: Eureka Productions

Original release
- Network: Netflix
- Release: February 14, 2019 – June 12, 2020

Dating Around is an American reality dating streaming television series on Netflix. The six-episode first season premiered on February 14, 2019. It is the "first original dating series" that Netflix has produced.

Each episode of the series follows one person going on five blind dates, with dates including people of various races and sexual orientations.

On February 6, 2020, the series was renewed for a second season, which premiered on June 12, 2020.

== Episodes ==
Season	Episodes	Originally released
1	6	February 14, 2019
2	6	June 12, 2020

=== Season 1 (2019) ===
No. overall	No. in season	Title	Original release date
1	1	"Luke"	February 14, 2019
2	2	"Gurki"	February 14, 2019
3	3	"Lex"	February 14, 2019
4	4	"Leonard"	February 14, 2019
5	5	"Sarah"	February 14, 2019
6	6	"Mila"	February 14, 2019

=== Season 2 (2020) ===
No. overall	No. in season	Title	Original release date
7	1	"Justin"	June 12, 2020
8	2	"Ben"	June 12, 2020
9	3	"Deva"	June 12, 2020
10	4	"Heather"	June 12, 2020
11	5	"Brandon"	June 12, 2020
12	6	"Demi"	June 12, 2020

== Versions ==
Franchise with a currently airing season
Franchise with an upcoming season
Franchise with an unknown status
Franchise awaiting confirmation
Franchise that has ceased to air

Country/Region	Local title	Network	Series and winners
Brazil	O Crush Perfeito	Netflix	Season 1, 2020: TBA
