= The Quiz with Balls =

American game show

- Genre: Game show
- Directed by: Kate Douglas-Walker (season 1); Sander Vahle (season 2); Stado Hamer (season 2)
- Presented by: Jay Pharoah
- Composer: David Vanacore
- Country of origin: United States
- Original language: English
- No. of seasons: 3
- No. of episodes: 34

Production
- Executive producers: John de Mol; Maarten Meijs; Chris Culvenor; Paul Franklin; Wes Dening; John Leahy; Anthony Carbone; Tom Ruff
- Producer: Jay Pharoah
- Production locations: Melbourne, Australia
- Camera setup: Multi-camera
- Running time: 42–44 minutes
- Production companies: Eureka Productions; Talpa Studios; Fox Entertainment

Original release
- Network: Fox
- Release: May 28, 2024 – present

The Quiz with Balls is an American game show that premiered on May 28, 2024, on Fox. The series is produced by Talpa Studios and Eureka Productions which is a division of Fremantle, and is hosted by Jay Pharoah. Contestants must answer pop culture and general knowledge questions correctly, or else incorrect answers will result in contestants being pushed into a giant pool of water by large size balls.

This game show is the adaptation of the Dutch TV series De kwis met ballen. Although Pharoah and the contestants are American, the show is actually produced and filmed at Docklands Studios in Melbourne, Australia.

== Format ==
=== Season 1 ===
Two teams compete per episode, each consisting of five members from a different immediate/extended family, and attempt to win up to $100,000. Six giant numbered balls are placed at the top of a set of parallel ramps leading down to the edge of a swimming pool. These balls correspond to possible answers to the questions that will be asked during the game.

The main game is played in five rounds and uses a list of 10 categories, each of which can be played only once. Both families receive one turn per round.

The family in control chooses a category and is asked a question with six answer choices, and as many correct answers as the number of members still in the game. Each answer is assigned to a different ramp, and the members must stand at the bottom of the ramps for the answers they believe to be correct, facing away from the ramps and over the pool. The balls are then released, ether all at once, in groups, or singly as requested by the host. If an answer is correct, a mechanism stops the ball before it can reach the bottom; if not, the ball hits the contestant and knocks them into the pool, eliminating them from the game.

Correct answers are worth $1,000 each in Round 1, with the value increasing by $1,000 per round. Initial control for Round 1 is determined by random draw, while for all others it is determined by high score (episodes 1-4 only) or by low score (as of episode 5). If a round ends in a tie, the family who had initial control retains it for the next one.

A family can win the game in one of four ways:

- By being in the lead at the end of Round 5.
- By playing first in Round 5 and having an insurmountable lead after their turn (episodes 1-4).
- By having the lead at the start of Round 5 and the opponents failing to tie or surpass their score (as of episode 5). The family in the lead takes their turn as in other rounds.
- By having at least one member survive their turn in any round while all opponents are eliminated. If this happens before Round 5, the surviving family continues the game alone, taking one turn per round until they either lose every member or complete Round 5.

Both families keep their accumulated money; each family can win up to $75,000 in the main game.

The winning family chooses one member who has not been eliminated to play the bonus round. That member selects one of two categories and is asked a question with six answers, five of which are correct. They must choose one answer at a time and stand at the bottom of its ramp as the ball is released. Finding all five correct answers increases the family's total to $100,000, while finding the incorrect answer ends the round immediately and allows the family to keep their main-game winnings.

=== Season 2 ===
Starting with Season 2, the main game is shortened to three rounds rather than five, and both teams receive two turns per round unless all the members of one team are eliminated. A new set of four categories is presented at the beginning of each round, and each team chooses one when their turn comes; no category may be used more than once. In addition, a lifeguard is on duty to help eliminated players swim to the edge of the pool and climb out.

The first two rounds are referred to as "Kickoff" and "Double-Up" ($1,000 and $2,000 per correct answer, respectively), and are played as in Season 1. In the third "All or Nothing" round, the team in control must find all the correct answers to their question in order to win $10,000. The team in the lead after the last question advances to the final "Golden Balls" round, in which one surviving member chooses one of two categories and is asked five questions, each with one correct answer. The same set of six responses is used for the entire round, with correct answers being removed after they are chosen. Correctly answering all five questions increases the team's winnings to $100,000, while a miss at any time ends the round and allows them to keep all money won to that point.

Each team can win up to $50,000 in the main game.

=== Ball Breaker Round ===
If the scores are tied at the end of the game, an extra "Ball Breaker" round is played. The host announces a category, and each family selects one member to represent them. The host asks a question with six answer choices, which are ranked by how closely they fit the stated criterion. Each contestant selects one answer; the one with the higher-ranked choice wins the game for their team and plays the Golden Balls round.

=== Season 3 ===
Starting with Season 3, during the Double-Up Round (in select episodes), a special question is called the Bonus Ball question. If one member of the family/team gets a correct answer, they will win a personal prize.

== Production ==
On February 7, 2024, it was announced that Fox had ordered the series. On February 21, 2024, Jay Pharoah was announced as the host. On March 4, 2024, it was announced that the series would premiere on May 28, 2024.

In February 2025, the series was renewed for a second season, which premiered on June 2, 2025. On February 17, 2026, it was announced that a third season would premiere on April 13, 2026.

== Episodes ==
=== Series overview ===
Season	Episodes	Originally released	
Season	Episodes	First released	Last released
1	10	May 28, 2024	September 3, 2024
2	12	June 2, 2025	September 8, 2025
3	12	April 13, 2026	August 17, 2026

=== Season 1 (2024) ===
No. overall	No. in season	Title	Original release date	Prod. code	U.S. viewers (millions)	Rating (18–49)
1	1	"Beantown vs The Big Apple"	May 28, 2024	QWB-105	1.51	0.3
Episode 1 Results: Wheatley Family vs. Harris Family: Families: Wheatley (Shayna, Shivonne [Shayna's sister], (Note: This person was out after giving the wrong answer to the sixth question.) Christian [Shayna's brother], (Note: This person was out after giving the wrong answer to the fourth question.) Monique [Shayna's cousin], (Note: This person was out after giving the wrong answer to the first question.) PJ [Monique's husband]); Harris (Sierra, (Note: This person was out after giving the wrong answer to the seventh question.) Lynne [Sierra's mother], Jeff [Sierra's father], (Note: This person was out after giving the wrong answer to the fifth question.) Alana [Sierra's aunt], Chris [Sierra's uncle] (Note: This person was out after giving the wrong answer to the ninth question.)); Categories: Best in Show, Notable People, Game Night, Famous Authors, Geography, Girl Groups, Ahoy Mate!, Space Race, Foods, On Broadway; 1. Notable People (Wheatley; Amount Won: $4,000); 2. Girl Groups (Harris; Amount Won: $5,000); 3. Foods (Harris; Amount Won: $15,000); 4. Game Night (Wheatley; Amount Won: $10,000); 5. Ahoy Mate! (Harris; Amount Won: $27,000); 6. On Broadway (Wheatley; Amount Won: $16,000); 7. Best in Show (Harris; Amount Won: $35,000); 8. Geography (Wheatley; Amount Won: $24,000); 9. Space Race (Harris; Amount Won: $40,000); Extra Categories: World Sports, Movie Villains; 1. Movie Vilains (Harris [Lynne]; Amount Won: $40,000) (Note: 3 right answers/1 wrong answer.)
2	2	"The Southern Showdown"	June 4, 2024	QWB-107	1.51	0.2
Episode 2 Results: Byars Family vs. Banks Family: Families: Byars (Jay, Jessi [Jay's wife], (Note: This person was out after giving the wrong answer to the third question.) Dustin [Jessi's brother], Tia [Jay's cousin], Chris [Jay's cousin]); Banks (Takenya, Telisa [Takenya's cousin-in-law], (Note: This person was out after giving the wrong answer to the second question.) Neshia, (Note: This person was out after giving the wrong answer to the eighth question.) Tonya [Takenya's aunt], Alexandria [Takenya's cousin]); Categories: Toy Store, Sports, Literature, The Human Body, In Style, U.S. Geography, On the Farm, Word Up, Movies, World Trivia; 1. Sports (Byars; Amount Won: $5,000); 2. Movies (Banks; Amount Won: $4,000); 3. On the Farm (Byars; Amount Won: $13,000); 4. Word Up (Banks; Amount Won: $10,000); 5. U.S. Geography (Byars; Amount Won: $25,000); 6. The Human Body (Banks; Amount Won: $16,000); 7. In Style (Byars; Amount Won: $37,000); 8. Toy Store (Banks; Amount Won: $20,000); 9. World Trivia (Byars; Amount Won: $47,000); Extra Categories: Classic Rock, Red Carpet; 1. Classic Rock (Byars [Chris]; Amount Won: $47,000) (Note: 1 wrong answer.)
3	3	"A Family Affair"	June 11, 2024	QWB-101	1.62	0.3
Episode 3 Results: Guillen Family vs. Patel Family: Families: Guillen (Sophia, Karen [Sophia's mother], Ambioris [Sophia's father], Genesis [Sophia's sister], Katherine [Sophia's sister]); Patel (Anip, Dharma [Anip's aunt], Vigen [Anip's brother-in-law], Shachi [Anip's cousin], Darsha [Anip's sister]); Categories: Say Cheese, American Pastimes, World Languages, Pop Culture, Green Thumb, Something Fishy, Bedtime Stories, Olympic Games, Foreign Exchange, Reality TV; 1. Pop Culture (Patel; Amount Won: $4,000); 2. Reality TV (Guillen; Amount Won: $5,000); 3. World Languages (Patel; Amount Won: $10,000); 4. Say Cheese (Guillen; Amount Won: $13,000); 5. American Pastimes (Patel; Amount Won: $19,000); 6. Something Fishy (Guillen; Amount Won: $19,000); 7. Foreign Exchange (Patel; Amount Won: $27,000); 8. Bedtime Stories (Guillen; Amount Won: $27,000); 9. Olympic Games (Patel; Amount Won: $32,000); 10. Green Thumb (Guillen; Amount Won: $37,000); Extra Categories: Medieval Times, Capture the Flags; 1. Medieval Times (Guillen [Karen]; Amount Won: $37,000) (Note: 4 right answers/1 wrong answer.)
4	4	"Clash of the Coasts"	June 18, 2024	QWB-108	1.94	0.3
Episode 4 Results: Garciga Family vs. Buckalew Family: Families: Garciga (Juan, Laura [Juan's sister], Leonel [Juan's father], Ana Maria [Juan's sister], Amanda [Juan's sister]); Buckalew (Becca, David [Becca's brother], Leslie [Becca's mother], Joe [Becca's father], Brad [Becca's uncle]); Categories: Physics, Celebrity Culture, Astronomy, U.S. States, Workin' Out, Kid's Classics, Pop Music, Farm to Table, Wine & Dine, Critters; 1. Pop Music (Garciga; Amount Won: $4,000); 2. Wine & Dine (Buckalew; Amount Won: $4,000); 3. Kid's Classics (Garciga; Amount Won: $10,000); 4. Farm to Table (Buckalew; Amount Won: $10,000); 5. Celebrity Culture (Garciga; Amount Won: $19,000); 6. U.S. States (Buckalew; Amount Won: $13,000); 7. Workin' Out (Garciga; Amount Won: $31,000); 8. Critters (Buckalew; Amount Won: $13,000); 9. Astronomy (Garciga; Amount Won: $41,000); Extra Categories: Sports, Movies; 1. Movies (Garciga [Juan]; Amount Won: $41,000)
5	5	"Brains vs. Brawns"	June 25, 2024	QWB-109	1.40	0.2
Episode 5 Results: Wyse Family vs. Brooks Family: Families: Wyse (Shane, Brittany (Shane's wife), Ryan (Shane's cousin), Christian (Shane's cousin), Corrie (Shane's cousin)); Brooks (Kelly, KC (Kelly's sister), Nancy (Kelly's sister), Avery (Kelly's daughter), Brooke (Kelly's daughter)); Categories: Nature, Books, Fashion, World Geography, Music, Foods, Hot Stuff, Art History, Movies, Animal Science; 1. Movies (Wyse) (Amount Won: $4,000); 2. Foods (Brooks) (Amount Won: $5,000); 3. Music (Wyse) (Amount Won: $8,000); 4. Books (Brooks) (Amount Won: $15,000); 5. Hot Stuff (Wyse) (Amount Won: $8,000); 6. World Geography (Brooks) (Amount Won: $27,000); 7. Animal Science (Brooks) (Amount Won: $43,000); 8. Fashion (Brooks) (Amount Won: $58,000); Extra Categories: History, Sports; 1. Sports (Brooks (KC)) (Amount Won: $100,000) (Note: 5 right answers.)
6	6	"Football Frenzy"	July 9, 2024	QWB-106	1.65	0.3
Episode 6 Results: Guillory Family vs. Gresham Family: Families: Guillory (Danny, Courtney (Danny's sister), Tyron (Danny's father), Debbie (Danny's mother), Ana (Danny's sister)); Gresham (Jacob, Jan (Jacob's mother), Zack (Jacob's brother), Scott (Jacob's uncle), Jo Anna (Jacob's aunt)); Categories: Ballers, Weather Report, Music, Hit Movies, (Doctor, Doctor), Academia, Foods, Book It, Toe to Toe, Geography; 1. Foods (Guillory) (Amount Won: $5,000); 2. Book It (Gresham) (Amount Won: $5,000); 3. Ballers (Guillory) (Amount Won: $13,000); 4. Academia (Gresham) (Amount Won: $15,000); 5. Toe to Toe (Guillory) (Amount Won: $22,000); 6. Music (Gresham) (Amount Won: $30,000); 7. Doctor, Doctor (Gresham) (Amount Won: $46,000); 8. Geography (Gresham) (Amount Won: $66,000); Extra Categories: Red Carpet, Animal Science; 1. Animal Science (Gresham (Zack)) (Amount Won: $66,000)
7	7	"School of Splash"	July 23, 2024	QWB-110	1.54	0.3
Episode 7 Results: McGlothin Family vs. Bowser Family: Families: McGlothin (John Jr., John Sr. (John Jr.'s father), Kaitlyn (John Jr.'s sister), Raven (John Jr.'s brother), Brooklyn (John Jr.'s sister)); Bowser (Jodi, Will (Jodi's husband), Suzy (Jodi's aunt), Liz (Jodi's aunt), Kevin (Jodi's uncle) (Note: This person was out after giving the wrong answer to the tenth question.)); Categories: I'm Hungry, Starry Nights, Fun & Games, In Style, Animal Science, American History, Sports, Flags, Weather Report, Film & TV; 1. Film & TV (McGlothin) (Amount Won: $5,000); 2. Fun & Games (Bowser) (Amount Won: $5,000); 3. American History (McGlothin) (Amount Won: $13,000); 4. I'm Hungry (Bowser) (Amount Won: $15,000); 5. Sports (McGlothin) (Amount Won: $19,000); 6. In Style (Bowser) (Amount Won: $27,000); 7. Starry Nights (McGlothin) (Amount Won: $23,000); 8. Weather Report (Bowser) (Amount Won: $39,000); 9. Flags (McGlothin) (Amount Won: $23,000); 10. Animal Science (Bowser) (Amount Won: $49,000); Extra Categories: Classic Rock, Literature; 1. Classic Rock (Bowser (Jodi)) (Amount Won: $49,000)
8	8	"Sister Act"	August 20, 2024	QWB-103	1.42	0.2
Episode 8 Results: Barnes Family vs. Lees Family: Families: Barnes (Corisma, Cekell (Corisma's sister), Chaval (Corisma's sister), Casmè (Corisma's sister), Cathy (Corisma's sister)); Lees (Lindsay, Ashley (Lindsay's sister), Brittany (Lindsay's sister), Jason (Lindsay's husband), Brad (Lindsay's brother-in-law)); Categories: Breakfast Foods, '90s TV, World Languages, Animal Science, Boy Bands, Across the Universe, Extreme Sports, Music Lessons, Highways & Byways, Dating Apps; 1. '90s TV (Lees) (Amount Won: $5,000); 2. Breakfast Foods (Barnes) (Amount Won: $4,000); 3. Animal Science (Lees) (Amount Won: $15,000); 4. Dating Apps (Barnes) (Amount Won: $10,000); 5. Highways & Byways (Lees) (Amount Won: $30,000); 6. Across the Universe (Lees) (Amount Won: $50,000); 7. World Languages (Lees) (Amount Won: $75,000); Extra Categories: The Human Body, Classic Literature; 1. The Human Body (Lees (Jason)) (Amount Won: $100,000)
9	9	"Mom Knows Best"	August 27, 2024	QWB-102	1.66	0.2
Episode 9 Results: Mitchell Family vs. McGraw Family: Families: Mitchell (Anthony, Carla (Anthony's mother), Michael (Anthony's brother), Kristen (Anthony's wife), Jeremy (Anthony's brother)); McGraw (Jessica, Diana (Jessica's mother), Kevin (Jessica's father), Kyle (Jessica's brother), Angela (Jessica's sister)); Categories: Home Improvement, Hot Stuff, Kids TV, Geometry, Pop Music, Animal Science, World Sports, Language, Celebrity Culture, Fun & Games; 1. Pop Music (McGraw) (Amount Won: $5,000); 2. Fun & Games (Mitchell) (Amount Won: $5,000); 3. Hot Stuff (McGraw) (Amount Won: $13,000); 4. Celebrity Culture (Mitchell) (Amount Won: $13,000); 5. Home Improvement (McGraw) (Amount Won: $22,000); 6. Kids TV (Mitchell) (Amount Won: $25,000); 7. Language (McGraw) (Amount Won: $34,000); 8. Animal Science (Mitchell) (Amount Won: $37,000); 9. Geometry (McGraw) (Amount Won: $49,000); 10. World Sports (Mitchell) (Amount Won: $52,000); Extra Categories: Award Shows, Capture the Flags; 1. Capture the Flags (Mitchell (Anthony)) (Amount Won: $52,000)
10	10	"Boston Brawlers vs. The Pride of Polynesia"	September 3, 2024	QWB-104	1.63	0.3
Episode 10 Results: Schlehuber Family vs. Halaufia Family: Families: Schlehuber (Kevin, Ilanna (Kevin's daughter), Andrew (Kevin's son), Olivia (Kevin's daughter), Joshua (Olivia's boyfriend)); Halaufia (Vonda, Ivan (Vonda's nephew), Koloa (Vonda's nephew), Lavi (Vonda's niece), Seyvion (Vonda's niece)); Categories: Sports Lingo, The Human Body, Snack Time, The Great Outdoors, Award Winners, Animal Science, Movie Stars, Fashion Trends, Working Out, Foreign Exchange; 1. Movie Stars (Schlehuber) (Amount Won: $4,000); 2. Working Out (Halaufia) (Amount Won: $5,000); 3. Snack Time (Schlehuber) (Amount Won: $10,000); 4. Sports Lingo (Halaufia) (Amount Won: $15,000); 5. The Human Body (Schlehuber) (Amount Won: $19,000); 6. The Great Outdoors (Halaufia) (Amount Won: $30,000); 7. Fashion Trends (Halaufia) (Amount Won: $50,000); 8. Award Winners (Halaufia) (Amount Won: $70,000); Extra Categories: Book Smarts, Kings & Queens; 1. Kings & Queens (Halaufia (Koloa)) (Amount Won: $100,000)

=== Season 2 (2025) ===
No. overall	No. in season	Title	Original release date	Prod. code	U.S. viewers (millions)	Rating (18–49)
11	1	"Empire State vs. Garden State"	June 2, 2025	QWB-207	1.30	0.2
Episode 1 Results: Montague Family vs. Barone Family: Families: Montague (Luteechia, Demetria (Luteechia's cousin), Tinika (Luteechia's sister), Nadia (Luteechia's cousin), Darnell (Luteechia's cousin)); Barone (Samantha, Rhonda (Samantha's mother), Carly (Samantha's sister), Janet (Samantha's cousin), Lisa (Samantha's cousin)); Categories: Kickoff Round: Big & Tall, Animal Science, Sports, Movies; 1. Movies (Montague) (Amount Won: $4,000); 2. Animal Science (Barone) (Amount Won: $4,000); 3. Big & Tall (Montague) (Amount Won: $6,000); 4. Sports (Barone) (Amount Won: $7,000); Double Up Round: In the Club, Memorable Memes, Tech Stuff, Books; 1. In the Club (Barone) (Amount Won: $11,000); 2. Memorable Memes (Montague) (Amount Won: $8,000); 3. Tech Stuff (Barone) (Amount Won: $15,000); 4. Books (Montague) (Amount Won: $10,000); All or Nothing Round: Countries, Pop Culture, Game Night, Sea Worthy; 1. Game Night (Montague) (Amount Won: $20,000); 2. Pop Culture (Barone) (Amount Won: $15,000); 3. Sea Worthy (Montague) (Amount Won: $30,000); Golden Balls: Divas, Inventors; 1. Divas (Montague (Luteechia)) (Amount Won: $30,000) (Note: 2 right answers/1 wrong answer.)
12	2	"Pasta Lovers vs. Loving Pastors"	June 9, 2025	QWB-210	1.14	0.2
Episode 2 Results: Santo Family vs. Powell Family: Families: Santo (Connor, Vince (Connor's father), Kelly (Connor's mother), Megan (Connor's wife), Kyle (Connor's brother)); Powell (Anthony, Bonnie (Anthony's wife), AJ (Anthony's son), Leilani (Anthony's daughter), Alannah (Anthony's daughter)); Categories: Kickoff Round: Animal Science, Up the Ante, Foxy Hosts, World Geography; 1. Foxy Hosts (Santo) (Amount Won: $4,000); 2. Animal Science (Powell) (Amount Won: $5,000); 3. Up the Ante (Santo) (Amount Won: $7,000); 4. World Geography (Powell) (Amount Won: $10,000); Double Up Round: Foods, Heavy Metals, Wordy Gurdy, '80s Music; 1. Foods (Powell) (Amount Won: $18,000); 2. Wordy Gurdy (Santo) (Amount Won: $11,000); 3. Heavy Metals (Powell) (Amount Won: $26,000); 4. '80s Music (Santo) (Amount Won: $15,000); All or Nothing Round: Space Race, Tech, American Artists, Extreme Sports; 1. Extreme Sports (Santo) (Amount Won: $25,000); 2. Tech (Powell) (Amount Won: $26,000); 3. Space Race (Santo) (Amount Won: $35,000); 4. American Artists (Powell) (Amount Won: $36,000); Golden Balls: Tom Hanks Movies, Rappers; 1. Tom Hanks Movies (Powell (Anthony)) (Amount Won: $100,000)
13	3	"Island Vibe vs. Turkish Pride"	June 16, 2025	QWB-209	1.38	0.2
Episode 3 Results: Luca Family vs. Edmond Family: Families: Luca (Yasemin, Giana (Yasemin's daughter), Sofia (Yasemin's daughter), Mike (Yasemin's cousin), Sara (Yasemin's cousin-in-law)); Edmond (Alycia, Danielle (Alycia's sister), Triston (Alycia's brother), Ray (Alycia's husband), (Note: This person was out after giving the wrong answer to the twelfth question.) Derrick (Alycia's uncle)); Categories: Kickoff Round: Sports, Lifestyle, Movies, Feeling Saucy; 1. Lifestyle (Luca) (Amount Won: $4,000); 2. Feeling Saucy (Edmond) (Amount Won: $4,000); 3. Sports (Luca) (Amount Won: $7,000); 4. Movies (Edmond) (Amount Won: $6,000); Double Up Round: Music, Hot Hot Hot, Small World, Dance Party; 1. Music (Edmond) (Amount Won: $10,000); 2. Dance Party (Luca) (Amount Won: $13,000); 3. Small World (Edmond) (Amount Won: $14,000); 4. Hot Hot Hot (Luca) (Amount Won: $17,000); All or Nothing Round: Landmarks, Games, Literature, TV Shows; 1. TV Shows (Luca) (Amount Won: $17,000); 2. Landmarks (Edmond) (Amount Won: $24,000); 3. Games (Luca) (Amount Won: $27,000); 4. Literature (Edmond) (Amount Won: $24,000); Golden Balls: Classic Albums, Dogs; 1. Dogs (Luca (Sofia)) (Amount Won: $27,000)
14	4	"Pushing the Limit: Mind vs. Miles"	June 23, 2025	QWB-201	1.35	0.2
Episode 4 Results: Patel Family vs. Smith Family: Families: Patel (Darsh, Yash (Darsh's brother), Ashanti (Darsh's mother), Aumil (Darsh's father), Pradhi (Darsh's sister)); Smith (Ellie, Geri (Ellie's mother), Joe (Ellie's uncle), Joan (Ellie's aunt), Annalise (Ellie's cousin)); Categories: Kickoff Round: Sci-Fi Films, Foods, Music, Zero to Sixty; 1. Foods (Patel) (Amount Won: $5,000); 2. Music (Smith) (Amount Won: $4,000); 3. Zero to Sixty (Patel) (Amount Won: $10,000); 4. Sci-Fi Films (Smith) (Amount Won: $6,000); Double Up Round: Human Anatomy, Fun & Games, Foreign Exchange, Sports; 1. Fun & Games (Smith) (Amount Won: $8,000); 2. Sports (Patel) (Amount Won: $18,000); 3. Foreign Exchange (Smith) (Amount Won: $10,000); 4. Human Anatomy (Patel) (Amount Won: $26,000); All or Nothing Round: American Literature, Pop Culture, Movie Quotes, Animal Science; 1. Animal Science (Patel) (Amount Won: $36,000); 2. Pop Culture (Patel) (Amount Won: $46,000); Golden Balls: Astronomy, Fashion; 1. Astronomy (Patel (Darsh)) (Amount Won: $46,000)
15	5	"Battle of the Ballers"	July 7, 2025	QWB-202	1.37	0.2
Episode 5 Results: Whitmore Family vs. Novaes Family: Families: Whitmore (Showtime, Payton (Showtime's daughter), Domenique (Showtime's daughter), Jalen (Showtime's son), (Note: This person was out after giving the wrong answer to the eleventh question.) Miranda (Showtime's wife)); Novaes (Mariana, Thiago (Mariana's brother), Felipe (Mariana's brother), Jayson (Mariana's fiancé), Samantha (Mariana's sister-in-law)); Categories: Kickoff Round: World Geography, Award Winners, Sports, Slang Terms; 1. Sports (Whitmore) (Amount Won: $5,000); 2. Slang Terms (Novaes) (Amount Won: $4,000); 3. Award Winners (Whitmore) (Amount Won: $9,000); 4. World Geography (Novaes) (Amount Won: $7,000); Double Up Round: Vacation Spots, Snacks, Blockbusters, Instruments; 1. Vacation Spots (Novaes) (Amount Won: $11,000); 2. Snacks (Whitmore) (Amount Won: $17,000); 3. Instruments (Novaes) (Amount Won: $13,000); 4. Blockbusters (Whitmore) (Amount Won: $21,000); All or Nothing Round: American Heroes, Martial Arts, Fashion, On TV; 1. American Heroes (Whitmore) (Amount Won: $31,000); 2. Martial Arts (Novaes) (Amount Won: $13,000); 3. On TV (Whitmore) (Amount Won: $31,000); Golden Balls: Art History, Leading Ladies; 1. Leading Ladies (Whitmore (Miranda)) (Amount Won: $31,000)
16	6	"Battle of the Brains"	July 14, 2025	QWB-204	1.33	0.2
Episode 6 Results: Burgos Family vs. Cring Family: Families: Cring (Jon, Jerrod (Jon's brother), Lily (Jon's niece), (Note: This person was out after giving the wrong answer to the tiebreaker question.) Izzy (Jon's niece), Angela (Jon's sister-in-law)); Burgos (Isabella, Valentina (Isabella's sister), Ricardo (Isabella's father), Alicia (Isabella's mother), Bernie (Isabella's uncle)); Categories: Kickoff Round: Name Game, Food, Applied Math, Derby Day; 1. Name Game (Cring) (Amount Won: $5,000); 2. Applied Math (Burgos) (Amount Won: $5,000); 3. Food (Cring) (Amount Won: $10,000); 4. Derby Day (Burgos) (Amount Won: $10,000); Double Up Round: Tennis, Jam Session, Sweet Tooth, Animal Science; 1. Animal Science (Burgos) (Amount Won: $20,000); 2. Jam Session (Cring) (Amount Won: $20,000); 3. Sweet Tooth (Burgos) (Amount Won: $28,000); 4. Tennis (Cring) (Amount Won: $28,000); All or Nothing Round: Daytime TV, World Languages, Shiny Things, Movie Stars; 1. Movie Stars (Cring) (Amount Won: $38,000); 2. World Languages (Burgos) (Amount Won: $38,000); 3. Daytime TV (Cring) (Amount Won: $48,000); 4. Shiny Things (Burgos) (Amount Won: $48,000); Ball Breaker Round: Sports; 1. (Burgos (Valentina) vs. Cring (Lily)) (Amount Won: $48,000); Golden Balls: Children's Authors, Baseball; 1. Children's Authors (Burgos (Valentina)) (Amount Won: $48,000)
17	7	"The Bad Guys 2 in The Quiz With Balls"	July 21, 2025	QWB-205	1.35	0.2
Episode 7 Results: Sinclair-Bryant Family vs. Behrakis Family: Families: Sinclair-Bryant (Buddy, Derrick (Buddy's son), Brittoni (Buddy's daughter-in-law), Keith (Buddy's son-in-law), Brittney (Buddy's daughter)); Behrakis (Matthew, David (Matthew's brother), Peter (Matthew's father), Kendra (Matthew's mother), Donna (Matthew's aunt)); Categories: Kickoff Round: Hot Jobs, Meat Cute, Fashion, Athletes; 1. Hot Jobs (Sinclair-Bryant) (Amount Won: $4,000); 2. Athletes (Behrakis) (Amount Won: $4,000); 3. Meat Cute (Sinclair-Bryant) (Amount Won: $6,000); 4. Fashion (Behrakis) (Amount Won: $8,000); Double Up Round: Music Theory, Travel, Ancient Egypt, Words; 1. Travel (Behrakis) (Amount Won: $14,000); 2. Music Theory (Sinclair-Bryant) (Amount Won: $8,000); 3. Words (Behrakis) (Amount Won: $20,000); 4. Ancient Egypt (Sinclair-Bryant) (Amount Won: $14,000); All or Nothing Round: Bread Basket, Stadiums, Marine Life, Rap Legends; 1. Rap Legends (Sinclair-Bryant) (Amount Won: $24,000); 2. Stadiums (Behrakis) (Amount Won: $20,000); 3. Marine Life (Sinclair-Bryant) (Amount Won: $34,000); Golden Balls: Divas, Games; 1. Games (Sinclair-Bryant (Keith)) (Amount Won: $34,000) (Note: 1 right answer/1 wrong answer.)
18	8	"City Lights, Country Might"	July 28, 2025	QWB-212	1.50	0.2
Episode 8 Results: Ludemann Family vs. Minervini Family: Families: Ludemann (Kacie, Kim (Kacie's mother), Dewey (Kacie's father), Dan (Kacie's husband), Wes (Kacie's cousin)); Minervini (Spencer, Craig (Spencer's father), Ginna (Spencer's aunt), Chase (Spencer's brother), Doug (Spencer's uncle)); Categories: Kickoff Round: Car Culture, World Languages, Snow Day, Video Games; 1. Snow Day (Ludemann) (Amount Won: $4,000); 2. Video Games (Minervini) (Amount Won: $4,000); 3. Car Culture (Ludemann) (Amount Won: $7,000); 4. World Languages (Minervini) (Amount Won: $7,000); Double Up Round: You Donkey!, Countries, Animal Science, Movies; 1. Countries (Minervini) (Amount Won: $13,000); 2. Animal Science (Ludemann) (Amount Won: $11,000); 3. You Donkey! (Minervini) (Amount Won: $19,000); 4. Movies (Ludemann) (Amount Won: $15,000); All or Nothing Round: Chemistry, U.S. Geography, Happy Hour, Sports; 1. Sports (Ludemann) (Amount Won: $25,000); 2. U.S. Geography (Minervini) (Amount Won: $29,000); 3. Happy Hour (Ludemann) (Amount Won: $25,000); 4. Chemistry (Minervini) (Amount Won: $29,000); Golden Balls: 20th Century, Legendary Quarterbacks; 1. 20th Century (Minervini (Chase)) (Amount Won: $100,000)
19	9	"Next Level Chef Takes on the Balls"	August 11, 2025	QWB-211	1.73	0.2
Episode 9 Results: Younger Family vs. Abdelhamid Family: Families: Younger (Tini, Antoine (Tini's husband), Chris (Tini's father), Vicki (Tini's mother), Hank (Tini's grandfather)); Abdelhamid (Mada, Maryam (Mada's wife), Mariam (Mada's sister), Tarek (Mada's father), Ali (Mada's brother-in-law)); Categories: Kickoff Round: Famous Faces, Fightin' Words, Hell's Kitchens, '70s Fashion; 1. Hell's Kitchens (Younger) (Amount Won: $5,000); 2. Fightin' Words (Abdelhamid) (Amount Won: $4,000); 3. '70s Fashion (Younger) (Amount Won: $10,000); 4. Famous Faces (Abdelhamid) (Amount Won: $6,000); Double Up Round: Mmm... Tasty, Slang, World Geography, Taylor Made; 1. Mmm... Tasty (Abdelhamid) (Amount Won: $10,000); 2. World Geography (Younger) (Amount Won: $20,000); 3. Slang (Abdelhamid) (Amount Won: $14,000); 4. Taylor Made (Younger) (Amount Won: $28,000); All or Nothing Round: Classic Cars, Foods, Cover Girls, Movie Quotes; 1. Foods (Younger) (Amount Won: $38,000); 2. Movie Quotes (Younger) (Amount Won: $48,000); Golden Balls: Heartthrobs, Best Pictures; 1. Heartthrobs (Younger (Vicki)) (Amount Won: $48,000)
20	10	"Southern Charm vs. Pacific Heat"	August 18, 2025	QWB-208	1.51	0.2
Episode 10 Results: Usry Family vs. Herrera Family: Families: Usry (Andrea, Falan (Andrea's sister), Lindsey (Andrea's sister), Michael (Andrea's brother), Dave (Andrea's husband)); Herrera (Marianne, Moira (Marianne's cousin), Louise (Marianne's cousin), Jeralyn (Marianne's cousin), Mimi (Marianne's sister)); Categories: Kickoff Round: Phoning It In, Rock On, Sci-Fi, Cooking; 1. Cooking (Herrera) (Amount Won: $4,000); 2. Rock On (Usry) (Amount Won: $5,000); 3. Phoning It In (Herrera) (Amount Won: $6,000); 4. Sci-Fi (Usry) (Amount Won: $10,000); Double Up Round: Earth Science, U.S. Geography, Foreign Languages, Numbers; 1. U.S. Geography (Usry) (Amount Won: $20,000); 2. Foreign Languages (Herrera) (Amount Won: $8,000); 3. Earth Science (Usry) (Amount Won: $30,000); All or Nothing Round: Literature, Measurements, Sports, Pop Music; 1. Sports (Usry) (Amount Won: $40,000); 2. Measurements (Usry) (Amount Won: $50,000); Golden Balls: Action Movies, Man's Best Friend; 1. Action Movies (Usry (Michael)) (Amount Won: $50,000)
21	11	"Jocks Take on the Nerds"	August 25, 2025	QWB-203	1.37	0.2
Episode 11 Results: Baumann Family vs. Grimmer Family: Families: Baumann (Amy, Eli (Amy's son), Rob (Amy's brother-in-law), Dave (Amy's father-in-law), Eric (Amy's husband)); Grimmer (Stephanie, Joshua (Stephanie's brother), Niko, Wayne, Dara (Stephanie's mom)); Categories: Kickoff Round: Rock On, Chemistry, All Tied Up, Getting Medieval; 1. All Tied Up (Grimmer) (Amount Won: $5,000); 2. Getting Medieval (Baumann) (Amount Won: $5,000); 3. Rock On (Grimmer) (Amount Won: $10,000); 4. Chemistry (Baumann) (Amount Won: $9,000); Double Up Round: Kings & Queens, You Say Potato, Fashion Show, Binge Watch; 1. Binge Watch (Baumann) (Amount Won: $17,000); 2. You Say Potato (Grimmer) (Amount Won: $20,000); 3. King & Queens (Baumann) (Amount Won: $23,000); 4. Fashion Show (Grimmer) (Amount Won: $30,000); All or Nothing Round: World Geography, Astronomy, Historical Figures, '70s Movies; 1. '70s Movies (Grimmer) (Amount Won: $30,000); 2. World Geography (Baumann) (Amount Won: $23,000); 3. Historical Figures (Grimmer) (Amount Won: $30,000); 4. Astronomy (Baumann) (Amount Won: $23,000); Golden Balls: Painters, NBA Players; 1. Painters (Grimmer (Wayne)) (Amount Won: $30,000)
22	12	"Pitch Perfect"	September 8, 2025	QWB-206	1.42	0.2
Episode 12 Results: Fisher Family vs. Watts Family: Families: Fisher (Denny, Chris (Denny's dad), Jordan (Denny's cousin), Joe (Denny's uncle), Cari (Denny's mom)); Watts (Christian, Clara, Tarquise, Joyce, Christopher); Categories: Kickoff Round: Breakfast Cereals, Spelling Bee, World Capitals, Sports Bios; 1. Breakfast Cereals (Watts) (Amount Won: $5,000); 2. Spelling Bee (Fisher) (Amount Won: $5,000); 3. World Capitals (Watts) (Amount Won: $9,000); 4. Sports Bios (Fisher) (Amount Won: $9,000); Double Up Round: Scientists, Animals, Influencers, Reality TV; 1. Reality TV (Fisher) (Amount Won: $15,000); 2. Animals (Watts) (Amount Won: $15,000); 3. Influencers (Fisher) (Amount Won: $19,000); 4. Scientists (Watts) (Amount Won: $21,000); All or Nothing Round: By The Numbers, College Game Day, History, Air Up There; 1. Air Up There (Watts) (Amount Won: $31,000); 2. History (Fisher) (Amount Won: $19,000); 3. By The Numbers (Watts) (Amount Won: $31,000); Golden Balls: Best Pictures, Sports; 1. Sports (Watts (Christopher)) (Amount Won: $31,000)

=== Season 3 (2026) ===
No. overall	No. in season	Title	Original release date	Prod. code	U.S. viewers (millions)	Rating (18–49)
23	1	"K-Pop vs. Country"	April 13, 2026	QWB-309	N/A	TBA
Episode 1 Results: Scott Family vs. Aranas Family: Families: Scott (Katie, Jason (Katie's cousin), Victoria (Katie's cousin), Zack (Katie's husband), Michelle (Katie's aunt)) (Country); Aranas (Kel, Kay (Kel's wife), Kara (Kel's sister), Jerome (Kel's cousin), Sang (Kel's cousin)) (K-Pop); Categories: Kickoff Round: Word Up, Winter Sports, Celebrities, Crowd Pleasers; 1. Celebrities (Aranas) (Amount Won: $4,000); 2. Crowd Pleasers (Scott) (Amount Won: $4,000); 3. Winter Sports (Aranas) (Amount Won: $7,000); 4. Word Up (Scott) (Amount Won: $7,000); Double Up Round: What's Your Sign?, Human Body, Name That Toon, 90s Hits; 1. 90s Hits (Scott) (Amount Won: $11,000); 2. Name That Toon (Aranas) (Amount Won: $9,000); 3. Human Body (Scott) (Amount Won: $15,000); 4. What's Your Sign? (Aranas) (Amount Won: $11,000); All or Nothing Round: Thank the Academy, California Dreaming, By the Numbers, Famous Authors; 1. California Dreaming (Aranas) (Amount Won: $21,000); 2. By the Numbers (Scott) (Amount Won: $15,000); 3. Thank the Academy (Aranas) (Amount Won: $31,000); Golden Balls: World Geography, Holiday Movies; 1. Holiday Movies (Aranas (Kay)) (Amount Won: $31,000)
24	2	"First Responders Face-off"	April 20, 2026	QWB-303	N/A	TBA
Episode 2 Results: Nurses vs. Firefighters: Teams: Nurses (Ashley, Liliana, Kat, Keith (Ashley & Liliana & Kat's uncle), Doug); Firefighters (Dion, Micaiah, Judah (Micaiah's brother), Nate (Micaiah & Judah's brother), David); Categories: Kickoff Round: Fun with Emojis, Walk the Plank, In the Flow, Playing Doctor; 1. Playing Doctor (Firefighters) (Amount Won: $4,000); 2. Fun with Emojis (Nurses) (Amount Won: $4,000); 3. Walk the Plank (Firefighters) (Amount Won: $7,000); 4. In the Flow (Nurses) (Amount Won: $7,000); Double Up Round: Geography, Good & Evil, Fashion, TV Shows; 1. TV Shows (Nurses) (Amount Won: $9,000); 2. Geography (Firefighters) (Amount Won: $11,000); 3. Good & Evil (Nurses) (Amount Won: $9,000) (Note: This question is a Bonus Ball question.) (Note: If Keith chose the fifth answer instead of the sixth answer, he would have won a day of pampering at a luxury spa.); 4. Fashion (Firefighters) (Amount Won: $13,000); All or Nothing Round: Holidays, Pitch Perfect, Foodies, Game Night; 1. Game Night (Firefighters) (Amount Won: $23,000); 2. Holidays (Firefighters) (Amount Won: $33,000); Golden Balls: Girl Groups, Chemistry; 1. Chemistry (Firefighters (Nate)) (Amount Won: $33,000)
25	3	"Battle of the Viral Sensations"	April 27, 2026	QWB-310	N/A	TBA
Episode 3 Results: Skory Family vs. Sharpe Family: Families: Skory (Genevieve, Tylor (Genevieve's son), Gabriella (Genevieve's daughter), Cole (Genevieve's son), Eden (Genevieve's daughter)); Sharpe (Ron, Barbra (Ron's wife), Logan (Ron's son), Samantha (Ron's daughter), Mark (Ron's nephew)); Categories: Kickoff Round: Fads Diets, Feeling Blues, Show Me... States, Photo Ops; 1. Fads Diets (Sharpe) (Amount Won: $4,000); 2. Show Me... States (Skory) (Amount Won: $4,000); 3. Photo Ops (Sharpe) (Amount Won: $6,000); 4. Feeling Blues (Skory) (Amount Won: $7,000); Double Up Round: Podcasts, Presidents, Board Games, #Winning; 1. Board Games (Skory) (Amount Won: $13,000); 2. Podcasts (Sharpe) (Amount Won: $10,000); 3. #Winning (Skory) (Amount Won: $17,000); 4. Presidents (Sharpe) (Amount Won: $14,000); All or Nothing Round: Bettlemania, Double Teams, Celebrity Chefs, Medical Terms; 1. Celebrity Chefs (Sharpe) (Amount Won: $24,000); 2. Double Teams (Skory) (Amount Won: $17,000); 3. Bettlemania (Sharpe) (Amount Won: $34,000); Golden Balls: Grammy Winners, Shapes; 1. Grammy Winners (Sharpe (Samantha)) (Amount Won: $100,000)
26	4	"Football Rivals"	May 4, 2026	QWB-304	N/A	TBA
Episode 4 Results: Byrum Family vs. Hagen Family: Families: Byrum (Dominique, Carlton (Dominique's brother), Jake (Dominique's brother), Tiffani (Dominique's sister), Jarett (Dominique's brother)) (Bills) (Note: Carl Byrum is their father and the former running back for the Bills.); Hagen (Jenn, Tanner (Jenn's son), Dusty (Jenn's husband), Cooper (Jenn's son), Chelsey (Jenn's sister)) (Vikings); Categories: Kickoff Round: Fads & Trends, Under the Sea, Word Up!, Go Long!; 1. Under the Sea (Hagen) (Amount Won: $5,000); 2. Word Up! (Byrum) (Amount Won: $4,000); 3. Fads & Trends (Hagen) (Amount Won: $9,000); 4. Go Long! (Byrum) (Amount Won: $7,000); Double Up Round: TV Titans, High Fashion, Road Trip, Average Joes; 1. Road Trip (Byrum) (Amount Won: $11,000); 2. TV Titans (Hagen) (Amount Won: $15,000); 3. Average Joes (Byrum) (Amount Won: $15,000); 4. High Fashion (Hagen) (Amount Won: $19,000); All or Nothing Round: Pop Music, Presidents, Human Anatomy, Books; 1. Pop Music (Hagen) (Amount Won: $29,000); 2. Human Anatomy (Byrum) (Amount Won: $15,000); 3. Books (Hagen) (Amount Won: $39,000); Golden Balls: British Invasion, Famous Richards; 1. British Invasion (Hagen (Tanner)) (Amount Won: $39,000)
27	5	"Lifeguards vs. Beauty Queens"	May 18, 2026	QWB-302	N/A	TBA
Episode 5 Results: Lifeguards vs. Beauty Queens: Teams: Lifeguards (Daniel, Max, Reign, Sunny, Isaack) (Cabrillo Beach Lifeguards); Beauty Queens (Rachel (Miss Swimsuit USA International), Delaney (Miss Jacksonville Beach), Tiffany (Miss San Diego), Sara (Miss Austin), Fiona (Miss Boston)); Categories: Kickoff Round: Flower Power, Higher Education, Celebrities, Foreign Languages; 1. Celebrities (Lifeguards) (Amount Won: $4,000); 2. Higher Education (Beauty Queens) (Amount Won: $5,000); 3. Foreign Languages (Lifeguards) (Amount Won: $7,000); 4. Flower Power (Beauty Queens) (Amount Won: $9,000); Double Up Round: Under Arrest, Coffee Break, Sports, Real Big Fish; 1. Coffee Break (Beauty Queens) (Amount Won: $15,000) (Note: Delaney chose the fourth answer and won a year's supply of sunscreen.); 2. Under Arrest (Lifeguards) (Amount Won: $9,000); 3. Real Big Fish (Beauty Queens) (Amount Won: $19,000); 4. Sports (Lifeguards) (Amount Won: $11,000); All or Nothing Round: Candy is Dandy, Read It, Classic Toys, Tooth or Dare; 1. Candy is Dandy (Lifeguards) (Amount Won: $21,000); 2. Tooth or Dare (Beauty Queens) (Amount Won: $19,000); 3. Classic Toys (Lifeguards) (Amount Won: $31,000); Golden Balls: Best Pictures, Famous Scientists; 1. Famous Scientists (Lifeguards (Reign)) (Amount Won: $31,000)
28	6	"Marines vs. Air Force"	June 1, 2026	QWB-307	N/A	TBA
Episode 6 Results: Marines vs. Air Force: Teams: Marines (Alejandro, Jose, Alex, Joe, Brian); Air Force (Jenny, Tamiko, Paula, Alika, Stephanie); Categories: Kickoff Round: Old Money, Carrying a Torch, Home Cooking, Little Bow Wows; 1. Home Cooking (Air Force) (Amount Won: $4,000); 2. Little Bow Wows (Marines) (Amount Won: $5,000); 3. Old Money (Air Force) (Amount Won: $7,000); 4. Carrying a Torch (Marines) (Amount Won: $9,000); Double Up Round: Miss America, Country's Music, Just Saying, Hat's Off; 1. Just Saying (Marines) (Amount Won: $15,000); 2. Country's Music (Air Force) (Amount Won: $13,000) (Note: Stephanie chose the first answer and won 250 American pies.); 3. Miss America (Marines) (Amount Won: $19,000); 4. Hat's Off (Air Force) (Amount Won: $19,000); All or Nothing Round: One and Done, State Capitals, Comic Strips, Overseas Imports; 1. One and Done (Air Force) (Amount Won: $19,000); 2. State Capitals (Marines) (Amount Won: $29,000); 3. Comic Strips (Air Force) (Amount Won: $29,000); 4. Overseas Imports (Marines) (Amount Won: $29,000); Golden Balls: Iconic Actresses, Legendary Wrestlers; 1. Iconic Actresses (Air Force (Stephanie)) (Amount Won: $29,000)
29	7	"Soccer Showdown"	June 8, 2026	QWB-306	N/A	TBA
Episode 7 Results: Mathews Family vs. McIntyre Family: Families: Mathews (Rocío, John (Rocío's husband), Amber (Rocío's cousin), Lauren (Rocío's sister-in-law), Brian (Rocío's cousin)) (Team USA); McIntyre (Mike, Denise (Mike's wife), Taylor (Mike's daughter), Madison (Mike's daughter), Kaylee (Mike's daughter)) (Team England); Categories: Kickoff Round: Speak My Language, Famous Detectives, Tools, Sports; 1. Sports (Mathews) (Amount Won: $4,000); 2. Tools (McIntyre) (Amount Won: $4,000); 3. Speak My Language (Mathews) (Amount Won: $8,000); 4. Famous Detectives (McIntyre) (Amount Won: $7,000); Double Up Round: Legendary Athletes, Red Flags, Chemical Elements, Team Players; 1. Legendary Athletes (McIntyre) (Amount Won: $11,000); 2. Team Players (Mathews) (Amount Won: $14,000); 3. Red Flags (McIntyre) (Amount Won: $15,000); 4. Chemical Elements (Mathews) (Amount Won: $20,000); All or Nothing Round: By the Numbers, Sci-Fi Movies, Pop Music, Creepy Crawlies; 1. Sci-Fi Movies (Mathews) (Amount Won: $30,000); 2. Pop Music (McIntyre) (Amount Won: $25,000); 3. By the Numbers (Mathews) (Amount Won: $40,000); Golden Balls: Acting Athletes, Landmarks; 1. Landmarks (Mathews (John)) (Amount Won: $40,000)
30	8	"Harlem Globetrotters vs. Washington Generals"	July 13, 2026	QWB-311	N/A	TBA
Episode 8 Results: Harlem Globetrotters vs. Washington Generals: Teams: Harlem Globetrotters (Julian, Lucius, Maxwell, Alex, Donald); Washington Generals (Urbane, Kooper, Milik, Kayla, Eddie); Categories: Kickoff Round: Horror Flicks, Hairy Situation, Food & Beverage, Six Seven; 1. Food & Beverage (Washington Generals) (Amount Won: $4,000); 2. Six Seven (Harlem Globetrotters) (Amount Won: $5,000); 3. Hairy Situation (Washington Generals) (Amount Won: $8,000); 4. Horror Flicks (Harlem Globetrotters) (Amount Won: $10,000); Double Up Round: Famous Actors, Astrology, Comic Books, Sports History; 1. Sports History (Harlem Globetrotters) (Amount Won: $20,000); 2. Famous Actors (Washington Generals) (Amount Won: $16,000); 3. Comic Books (Harlem Globetrotters) (Amount Won: $30,000); 4. Astrology (Washington Generals) (Amount Won: $24,000) (Note: Eddie chose the fourth answer and won a lifetime supply of shoes.); All or Nothing Round: Cat-E-Gories, Theme Parks, Toy Stories, 90s Rap; 1. 90s Rap (Washington Generals) (Amount Won: $24,000); 2. Theme Parks (Harlem Globetrotters) (Amount Won: $30,000); 3. Cat-E-Gories (Washington Generals) (Amount Won: $34,000); 4. Toy Stories (Harlem Globetrotters) (Amount Won: $30,000); Golden Balls: Homerun Hitters, Musicals; 1. Homerun Hitters (Washington Generals (Eddie)) (Amount Won: $100,000)
31	9	"Hunters vs. Vegetarians"	July 20, 2026	QWB-312	N/A	TBA
Episode 9 Results: Stewart Family vs. Pratt Family: Families: Stewart (Ryan, Chelsea (Ryan's wife), Kotah (Ryan's cousin), Tessie (Ryan's cousin), Brant (Tessie's boyfriend)) (Hunters); Pratt (Lindsey, Sherry (Lindsey's mother), Bob (Lindsey's uncle), Alan (Lindsey's father), Teela (Lindsey's partner)) (Vegetarians); Categories: Kickoff Round: Podcasts, Measurements, Away Games, Tasty Trends; 1. Away Games (Stewart) (Amount Won: $4,000); 2. Tasty Trends (Pratt) (Amount Won: $4,000); 3. Measurements (Stewart) (Amount Won: $7,000); 4. Podcasts (Pratt) (Amount Won: $7,000); Double Up Round: Movies, Human Anatomy, Being Punctual, Bodies of Water; 1. Bodies of Water (Pratt) (Amount Won: $13,000); 2. Human Anatomy (Stewart) (Amount Won: $9,000); 3. Being Punctual (Pratt) (Amount Won: $17,000); 4. Movies (Stewart) (Amount Won: $11,000); All or Nothing Round: Renaissance Painters, TV History, Herb Your Enthusiasm, Fun & Games; 1. Fun & Games (Stewart) (Amount Won: $21,000); 2. Herb Your Enthusiasm (Pratt) (Amount Won: $27,000); 3. Renaissance Painters (Stewart) (Amount Won: $31,000); 4. TV History (Pratt) (Amount Won: $27,000); Golden Balls: Rap Icons, Classic Novels; 1. Classic Novels (Pratt (Chelsea)) (Amount Won: $31,000)
32	10	"Extracted"	July 27, 2026	QWB-301	N/A	TBA
Episode 10 Results: Rogers Family vs. Kratovil Family: Families: Rogers (Doug, Dayton (Doug's son), Lesley (Doug's wife), Becky (Doug's sister), Roy (Doug's brother-in-law)); Kratovil (Katie, Emily (Katie's sister), Carly (Katie's sister), Maggie (Katie's sister), Ashley (Katie's sister)); Categories: Kickoff Round: Medical Stuff, Two Wheelers, Potato, Potato, How's the Weather?; 1. Potato, Potato (Rogers) (Amount Won: $4,000); 2. Two Wheelers (Kratovil) (Amount Won: $5,000); 3. How's the Weather? (Rogers) (Amount Won: $6,000); 4. Medical Stuff (Kratovil) (Amount Won: $9,000); Double Up Round: Birds, College Sports, Adam's Eves, Name That Shroom; 1. Adam's Eves (Kratovil) (Amount Won: $15,000); 2. College Sports (Rogers) (Amount Won: $10,000); 3. Name That Shroom (Kratovil) (Amount Won: $19,000); 4. Birds (Rogers) (Amount Won: $14,000); All or Nothing Round: Music, Binge-Worthy, Roman Numerals, Six Seven; 1. Binge-Worthy (Rogers) (Amount Won: $24,000); 2. Six Seven (Kratovil) (Amount Won: $29,000); 3. Music (Rogers) (Amount Won: $24,000); 4. Roman Numerals (Kratovil) (Amount Won: $29,000); Golden Balls: Teen Movies, Fashion Week; 1. Teen Movies (Kratovil (Maggie)) (Amount Won: $29,000)
33	11	"Nerds vs. Models"	August 10, 2026	QWB-305	N/A	TBA
Episode 11 Results: Star Wars Nerds vs. Models: Teams: Star Wars Nerds (Logan, Hunter, Jace, Thomas, Trey); Models (Sophia, Charlotte, Chloe, Maddie, Jaida); Categories: Kickoff Round: In Good Company, Hitmakers, Tom Foolery, Fun & Games; 1. Fun & Games (Models) (Amount Won: $4,000); 2. Tom Foolery (Star Wars Nerds) (Amount Won: $4,000); 3. Hitmakers (Models) (Amount Won: $6,000); 4. In Good Company (Star Wars Nerds) (Amount Won: $6,000); Double Up Round: Being Poetic, Tee Time, Buying in Bulk, Something's Fishy; 1. Tee Time (Star Wars Nerds) (Amount Won: $10,000) (Note: Logan chose the fourth answer and won workout equipment.); 2. Buying in Bulk (Models) (Amount Won: $10,000); 3. Something's Fishy (Star Wars Nerds) (Amount Won: $14,000); 4. Being Poetic (Models) (Amount Won: $12,000); All or Nothing Round: Sweet Treats, Sports Legends, Acting Families, Fort-itude; 1. Sweet Treats (Models) (Amount Won: $12,000); 2. Fort-itude (Star Wars Nerds) (Amount Won: $14,000); 3. Sports Legends (Star Wars Nerds) (Amount Won: $24,000); Golden Balls: Broadway Shows, Dynamic Duos; 1. Dynamic Duos (Star Wars Nerds (Logan)) (Amount Won: $24,000)
34	12	"Dentist vs. Funeral Directors"	August 17, 2026	QWB-308	N/A	TBA
Episode 12 Results: Rennick Family vs. Westford Family: Families: Rennick (Lindsey, Lauren (Lindsey's sister), Bryan (Lindsey's brother-in-law), Ryan (Lindsey's husband), John (Lindsey's father)) (Dentists); Westford (Michelle, Rob (Michelle's cousin), Riana (Rob's wife), David (Michelle's husband), Scott (Michelle's cousin)) (Funeral Directors); Categories: Kickoff Round: Musical Instruments, Dem Bones, Baked Goods, Dead and Buried; 1. Dem Bones (Rennick) (Amount Won: $4,000); 2. Dead and Buried (Westford) (Amount Won: $4,000); 3. Musical Instruments (Rennick) (Amount Won: $8,000); 4. Baked Goods (Westford) (Amount Won: $8,000); Double Up Round: Pitch Perfect, Sketch Comedy, World Geography, Magazines; 1. Sketch Comedy (Westford) (Amount Won: $16,000); 2. Pitch Perfect (Rennick) (Amount Won: $14,000); 3. Magazines (Westford) (Amount Won: $22,000); 4. World Geography (Rennick) (Amount Won: $18,000); All or Nothing Round: Acting Families, Fashion, Cultural Icons, U.S. Geography; 1. U.S. Geography (Rennick) (Amount Won: $18,000); 2. Cultural Icons (Westford) (Amount Won: $32,000); 3. Acting Families (Westford) (Amount Won: $32,000); Golden Balls: Motown Legends, Trophy Case; 1. Trophy Case (Westford (David)) (Amount Won: $32,000)

== International versions ==
International format and distribution rights are held by Talpa Studios.

Country	Name	Presenter(s)	Channel	Broadcast
Argentina	The Balls	Guido Kaczka (2025); Benjamín Vicuña (2026)	El Trece	March 10, 2025 – July 11, 2025; January 5, 2026 – February 27, 2026
Germany	Splash - Das Promi-Pool-Quiz	Sophia Thomalla	RTL	July 24, 2024 – July 31, 2024
Greece	The Quiz with Balls!	Yannis Tsimitselis	Skai TV	TBA 2026
Netherlands (original format)	De kwis met ballen	Johnny de Mol	SBS6	June 24, 2023 – present
Portugal	Ora Bolas!	Maria Cerqueira Gomes	TVI	September 13, 2025 – December 13, 2025
Spain	Juego de pelotas	Juanra Bonet; Patricia Conde	Antena 3	September 3, 2025 – present
Uruguay	The Balls	Maximiliano de la Cruz	Teledoce	July 2, 2025 – December 17, 2025
