= Chris Culvenor =

Australian businessman and television executive

Chris Culvenor is an Australian television executive and creator-developer. He is the co-founder of Eureka Productions, a TV production company based in Los Angeles and Sydney, and was co-CEO until leaving in 2025. The company produced many programs, including Holey Moley (ABC), Dating Around (Netflix), Crikey! It's the Irwins (Animal Planet), The Amazing Race Australia, The Voice (Nine), Australian Spartan (Seven), The Single Wives (Seven), and Drunk History (Comedy Central).

Culvenor has created a large number of US and Australian television formats including Holey Moley, Dating Around, Stars on Mars, TwentySomethings: Austin, The Real Dirty Dancing, Frogger The Real Love Boat, Fake Off, The Big Deal, Parental Guidance, The Chefs' Line, Behave Yourself, Billion Dollar Buyer, Restaurant Startup, The Single Wives, Going Wild, WAG Nation, The Observer Effect, MySpace Road Tour and Idol Backstage and in October 2013 he partnered with Steve Carell on the comedy series Riot on Fox.

Prior to founding Eureka, Culvenor worked as the Senior Vice President of Development at Shine America. During his time at Shine, the company sold and produced a large number of hit series including MasterChef, The Biggest Loser, The Face, The Office and The Bridge. Before his position at Shine, Culvenor held the position as Director of Digital Media and Alternative Programming at FremantleMedia Australia where he was responsible for the launch of The Apprentice Australia. He has also held producer and director positions at Grundy Television and Insight Productions in Canada.
