= Eureka Productions =

Australian-American unscripted television production company

- Type: Private
- Industry: Television production
- Founded: 2016; 10 years ago
- Founders: Chris Culvenor; Paul Franklin
- Headquarters: Los Angeles, California, United States; Sydney, New South Wales, Australia
- Area served: Australia; United States
- Owner: Fremantle (2021–present)
- Website: www.eurekagroup.tv

Eureka Productions is an Australian-American television production company majority-owned by Fremantle. Launched in 2016 by former Endemol Shine Australia executives Chris Culvenor and Paul Franklin with backing from Fremantle, the company primarily develops and produces non-scripted and reality programming in Australia and the United States.

Fremantle acquired a majority stake in Eureka in 2021. Since 2022, Eureka has been responsible for Fremantle's non-scripted output in Australia.

== History ==
The company was formed by Chris Culvenor and Paul Franklin, both executives with Endemol Shine Australia, setting up Los Angeles and Sydney offices in 2016. The company also formed a partnership with Fremantle to co-produce international projects, with the studio taking an investment in Eureka. In 2018, Eureka signed a deal with Lionsgate to be the exclusive distributor and producer of Lionsgate entertainment and unscripted series in Australia.

In 2021, Fremantle acquired a majority stake in Eureka. In 2022, Fremantle restructured its Australian operations to make Eureka responsible for all of its non-scripted output, assuming production duties for existing series such as Australian Idol from Fremantle Australia (which will primarily focus on scripted dramas and factual programming under new CEO Greg Woods).

== Productions ==
Programs with a shaded background indicate the program is still in production.

Title	Network	Years	Notes
The Employables	SBS	2016	
The Chefs' Line	SBS	2017–2018	
Behave Yourself	Seven Network	2017–2020	
The Voice Australia	Nine Network/Seven Network	2017–present	Co-production with ITV Studios Australia; season 6 onwards. Earlier Nine Network iteration co-produced by Talpa Media Group and Shine Australia.
The Single Wives	Seven Network	2018	
Pick, Flip and Drive	Facebook Watch	2018	
Australian Spartan	Seven Network	2018–2019	
The Launch	CTV (Canada)	2018–2019	Co-production with Bell Media and Insight Productions
Drunk History Australia	Network 10	2018–2020	
Crikey! It's the Irwins	Animal Planet; Discovery+	2018–2022	
Thrones 360	Foxtel	2019	
The Real Dirty Dancing	Seven Network	2019	
Deadly Cults	Oxygen (United States)	2019–2020	co-production with The Intellectual Property Corporation
Dating Around	Netflix	2019–2020	
Holey Moley	ABC (United States)	2019–2022	Co-production with Unanimous Media
The Amazing Race Australia	Network 10	2019–present	Season 4 onwards. Earlier Seven Network iteration produced by Active TV (seasons 1 & 2) and Seven Productions (season 3).
The Farmer Wants a Wife	Seven Network	2020–present	Co-production with Fremantle Australia; primary producer from Season 10 onwards
Full Bloom	HBO Max	2020–2021	
Finding Magic Mike	HBO Max	2021	Co-production with Warner Horizon Unscripted Television
Frogger	Peacock	2021	Co-production with Konami Cross Media NY
Holey Moley (Australia)	Seven Network	2021	Co-production with Unanimous Media.
Making It Australia	Network 10	2021	Co-production with Matchbox Pictures
Name That Tune	Fox (United States)	2021	Co-production with Prestige Entertainment and Fox Alternative Entertainment. Filmed in Sydney for the U.S. market. Subsequent seasons were co-produced by BiggerStage, Prestige and Fox Alternative Entertainment and filmed in Ireland.
Twenty Somethings: Austin	Netflix	2021	
Luxe Listings Sydney	Amazon Prime Video	2021–2022	co-production with Amazon Studios and Kentel Entertainment
Parental Guidance	Nine Network	2021–2025	
Byron Baes	Netflix	2022	Co-production with Superreal.
Kitchen Nightmares Australia	Seven Network	2022	
The Real Dirty Dancing (United States)	Fox (United States)	2022	Co-production with Lionsgate Television; Based on the Australian series of the same name.
The Real Love Boat (Australia)	Network 10	2022	
The Real Love Boat (United States)	CBS/Paramount+	2022	
The Parent Test	ABC (United States)	2022–2023	Co-production with Walt Disney Television Alternative. Based on the Australian series Parental Guidance
The Mole (United States)	Netflix	2022–2024	Earlier ABC iteration produced by Stone Stanley Entertainment.
Million Dollar Island	Seven Network	2023	
Stars on Mars	Fox (United States)	2023	
Australian Idol	Seven Network	2023–present	Previous seasons on Network 10 co-produced by FremantleMedia Australia and 19 Entertainment.
Farmer Wants a Wife	Fox (United States)	2023–present	Previous seasons on The CW produced by FremantleMedia North America and Super Delicious Productions.
The Floor	Fox (United States)	2024–present	Co-production with Talpa and BiggerStage
The Quiz with Balls	Fox (United States)	2024–present	Co-production with Talpa
Restoration Australia	ABC	2024–present	Co-production with Fremantle Australia; primary producer from Season 6 onwards
Grand Designs Australia	ABC	2024–present	Co-production with Fremantle Australia; primary producer from Season 11 onwards
The Secret DNA of Us	SBS	2025–present	
The Floor (Australia)	Nine Network	2025–present	Co-production with Talpa
KPopped	Apple TV+	2025–present	Co-production with CJ ENM
Choir of Hard Knocks: A New Chorus	ABC	2026–present	
Grand Designs Transformations	ABC	2026–present	Season 2 onwards; inherited from FremantleMedia Australia.
Wonka's The Golden Ticket	Netflix	2026–present	
Aussie Auctions	Network 10	2027–present	
Caught in the Middle	Seven Network	2027–present	Co-production with Talpa
Stacks of Cash (Australia)	Seven Network	2027–present	
Stacks of Cash (United States)	CBS	2027–present	
The Masked Singer (United States)	Fox (United States)	2027–present	Season 15 onwards. Earlier seasons produced by Endemol Shine North America (season 1), Fox Alternative Entertainment (seasons 2–13) and Fox Entertainment Studios (season 14).
