= The Real Dirty Dancing =

- Genre: Dancing; Entertainment
- Directed by: James Collins
- Presented by: Todd McKenney; Kym Johnson Herjavec
- Country of origin: Australia
- Original language: English
- No. of seasons: 1
- No. of episodes: 4

Production
- Executive producers: Chris Culvenor; Paul Franklin; Sonya Wilkes; Sophia Mogford
- Producers: Nick Contino; Josh King; Matt Lovkis; James Varty
- Running time: 90 minutes
- Production company: Eureka Productions

Original release
- Network: Seven Network
- Release: 30 September – 7 October 2019

The Real Dirty Dancing is an Australian talent show-themed television series that premiered on Seven Network on 30 September 2019. The series follows eight celebrities who revisit key locations and moments from the movie Dirty Dancing and learn the iconic dance routines under the guidance of choreographers Todd McKenney and Kym Johnson.

== Contestants ==
- Hugh Sheridan
- Jessica Rowe
- Jamie Durie
- Anne Edmonds
- Stephanie Rice
- Firass Dirani
- Jude Bolton
- Anna Heinrich

== Episodes ==
No.	Title	Original release date	Australian viewers
1	"Episode 1"	30 September 2019	635,000
Eight Aussie celebrities travel to the original Kellerman's Resort film location to undergo an immersive Dirty Dancing experience, recreating memorable movie moments and dance routines.
2	"Episode 2"	1 October 2019	612,000
As the celebrities continue their Dirty Dancing experience, it is time for the ladies to let their inhabitations go in a bid to be the ultimate 'Baby'.
3	"Episode 3"	6 October 2019	574,000
4	"Episode 4"	6 October 2019	612,000

== American version ==
On 19 January 2022, an American version was announced. It was hosted by Stephen "tWitch" Boss and produced by Eureka Productions and Lionsgate Television. It premiered on 1 February 2022 on Fox.

== British version ==
On 25 August 2021, Channel 4 announced that the British version would be hosted by Leigh Francis (formerly from Channel 4's Bo' Selecta!, and appearing in character as Keith Lemon on The Real Dirty Dancing), Pussycat Dolls member Ashley Roberts, and Dreamboys choreographer Jordan Darrell. This version is produced by Fremantle's Thames production company and premiered in February 2022 on E4.
