= List of Fremantle productions =

This is a list of programmes produced by Fremantle, a British-based international television content, production, and distribution subsidiary of Bertelsmann's RTL Group, Europe's largest TV, radio, and production company.

== Fremantle North America ==
Title	Years	Network	Notes
Beat the Clock	1950–1961; 1969–1974; 1979–1980; 2002–2003; 2018–2019	CBS; ABC; Syndication; CTV; PAX; Universal Kids	continued from Mark Goodson Productions co-production with Clock Productions (1969–1974), The Clock Company (1978–1980), Paxson Entertainment and Tick Tock Productions (2002–2003)
I've Got a Secret	1952–1967; 1972–1973; 1976; 2000–2001; 2006	CBS; Syndication; Oxygen; GSN	continued from Mark Goodson Productions and Pearson Television co-production with Burt Dubrow Production and Get Real Entertainment
To Tell the Truth	1956–1968; 1969–1978; 1980–1981; 1990–1991; 2000–2002; 2016–2022	CBS; Syndication; NBC; ABC	continued from Mark Goodson Productions and Pearson Television co-production with Gaspin Media and A2 Productions (2016–2022)
Password	1961–1967; 1971–1975; 2022–present	CBS; ABC; NBC	continued from Mark Goodson Productions co-production with Universal Television Alternative Studio and Electric Hot Dog (2022–)
Match Game	1962–1969; 1973–1982; 1990–1991; 1998–1999; 2016–2021; 2025–present	NBC; CBS; Syndication; ABC	continued from Mark Goodson-Bill Todman Productions and Mark Goodson Productions co-production with Entertain the Brutes, Triple Threat Productions and El Dorado Pictures (2016–2021)
Supermarket Sweep	1965–1967; 1990–1995; 2000–2003; 2020–2022	ABC; Lifetime; PAX	current distributor for 1990–2003 episodes, produced by Al Howard Productions
Let's Make a Deal	1968–1977	ABC; Syndication	current distributor; produced by Stefan Hatos-Monty Hall Productions
The Price Is Right	1972–present	CBS; Syndication	continued from Mark Goodson-Bill Todman Productions and Mark Goodson Productions syndicated by Viacom Enterprises (1972–1980), The Television Program Source (1985–1986) and Paramount Domestic Television (1994–1995)
Family Feud	1976–1985; 1988–1993; 1999–present	ABC; CBS; Syndication	continued from Mark Goodson-Bill Todman Productions and Mark Goodson Productions syndicated by Viacom Enterprises (1977–1985), LBS Communications (1988–1992), All American Television (1992–1995), Pearson Television (1999–2001), Tribune Entertainment (2001–2007) and Debmar-Mercury (2007–present)
Card Sharks	1978–1981; 1986–1989; 2001–2002; 2019–2021	NBC; CBS; Syndication; ABC	continued from Mark Goodson Productions co-production with Start Entertainment (2019–2021)
Press Your Luck	1983–1986; 2019–present	CBS; ABC	current distributor for 1983–1986 episodes co-production with The Carruthers Company (1983–1986) and Brownstone Productions (2019–present)
The All New Let's Make a Deal	1984–1986	Syndication	current distributor; produced by Stefan Hatos-Monty Hall Productions
Split Second	1986–1987	Syndication	current distributor; produced by Stefan Hatos-Monty Hall Productions
Baywatch	1989–2001	NBC; Syndication	continued from All-American Television; co-production with GTG Entertainment (1989–1990), The Baywatch Company, Tower 12 Productions (1991–2001) and Tower 18 Production Company (1996–2001)
Air America	1998–1999	Syndication	co-production with The Fremantle Corporation
First Wave	1998–2001	Space; Sci-Fi Channel	co-production with First Wave Productions, Sugar Entertainment and American Zoetrope
100%	1999	Syndication	co-production with O.H.P Productions
Ποιος θέλει να γίνει εκατομμυριούχος (Greek version of Who Wants to be a Millionaire?)	1999–2006	MEGA; NET; Alpha TV	
Jackie Bouvier Kennedy Onassis	2000	CBS	miniseries; co-production with West Egg Studios
100 Centre Street	2001–2002	A&E	co-production with Jaffe/Braunstein Films Ltd. and A&E Television Networks
Nero Wolfe	2001–2002	A&E	co-production with Jaffe/Braunstein Films Ltd. and A&E Television Networks
Ο Πιο Αδύναμος Κρίκος (Greek version of The Weakest Link)	2001–2003	MEGA	
Never Mind the Buzzcocks	2002	VH1	co-production with Eyeboogie Inc.
Whammy! The All-New Press Your Luck	2002–2003	Game Show Network	In season 2, the show was later renamed as Whammy! in 2003
American Idol	2002–2016; 2018–present	Fox; ABC	co-production with 19 Entertainment
American Juniors	2003	Fox	
World Idol	2003–2004	Fox	
Cupid	2003	CBS	co-production with Pilgrim Films & Television
Your Face or Mine?	2004	MTV	
The Complex: Malibu	2004	Fox	
The Swan	2004	Fox	co-production with A. Smith & Co. Productions, George Paige Associates Inc. and Galan Entertainment
How Clean Is Your House	2004–2005	Lifetime	
Distraction	2005–2006	Comedy Central	co-production with Comedy Partners
Game Show Moments Gone Bananas (1/2/3/4/5)	2005	VH1	
American Inventor	2006–2007	ABC	co-production with Peter Jones Productions and Syco TV
The Janice Dickinson Modeling Agency	2006–2008	Oxygen	co-production with Krasnow Productions
America's Got Talent	2006–present	NBC	co-production with Syco Entertainment
Monarch Cove	2006	Lifetime	
Gameshow Marathon	2006	CBS	co-production with Granada America
Temptation	2007–2008	Syndication	co-production with 20th Television
The Next Great American Band	2007	Fox	
Thank God You're Here	2007	NBC	co-production with Working Dog Productions and Bahr Small
Farmer Wants a Wife	2008	The CW	co-production with Super Delicious Productions
Celebrity Family Feud	2008; 2015–present	NBC; ABC	
Million Dollar Password	2008–2009	CBS	
Hole in the Wall	2008–2012	Fox; Cartoon Network	
Can You Duet	2008–2009	CMT	
Rock the Cradle	2008	MTV	
She's Got the Look	2008–2010	TV Land	Produced as FremantleMedia Enterprises
Osbournes Reloaded	2009	Fox	
Let's Make a Deal	2009–present	CBS	co-production with Stefan Hatos-Monty Hall Productions (2009-2021) and Marcus/Glass Productions (2021–present)
The Phone	2009	MTV	co-production with Just-In Time Entertainment and Park Lane Productions
Secret Girlfriend	2009	Comedy Central	
Kirstie Alley's Big Life	2010	A&E	
Downfall	2010	ABC	
What Chilli Wants	2010–2011	VH1	
Jump City: Seattle	2011	G4	
The X Factor	2011–2013	Fox	co-production with Syco Entertainment
Take Me Out	2012	Fox	
Total Blackout	2012–2013	Syfy	co-production with Endemol, Imagecraft and SyFy Productions
Bud United Presents: The Big Time	2012	ABC	co-production with RadicalMedia
Wedding Band	2012–2013	TBS	co-production with Tollin Productions
Married to Medicine	2013–present	Bravo	co-production with Purveyors of Pop and Bravo Media Productions
Perfect Score	2013	The CW	
The Tomorrow People	2013–2014	The CW	co-production with Berlanti/Plec, CBS Television Studios and Warner Bros. Television
The Great Christmas Light Fight	2013–present	ABC	co-production with Greengrass Productions and Base Camp Films
Celebrity Name Game	2014–2017	Syndication	co-production with Coquette Productions, Entertain the Brutes, Green Mountain West Inc., CBS Television Studios, 20th Television and Debmar-Mercury
The Returned	2015	A&E	co-production with A+E Studios, Carlton Cuse Productions and Angry Annie Productions
My Fab 40th	2015	Bravo	co-production with Purveyors of Pop
Married to Medicine: Houston	2016	Bravo	co-production with Purveyors of Pop and Bravo Media Productions
American Gods	2017–2021	Starz	co-production with Living Dead Guy, J.A. Green Construction Corp. and The Blank Corporation
The Noise	2017	Universal Kids	
IWitness	2017	Syndication	co-production with Queen Bee Production and Entertain the Brutes
Double Dare	2018–2019	Nickelodeon	co-production with Nickelodeon Productions
America's Got Talent: The Champions	2019–2020	NBC	co-production with Syco Entertainment
Married to Medicine: Los Angeles	2019–2020	Bravo	co-production with Purveyors of Pop and Bravo Media Productions
Unleashed	2020	Nickelodeon	co-production with Nickelodeon Productions
Game of Talents	2021	Fox	co-production with Apploff Entertainment and A Wayne and Mandie Creative; Based on the Spanish game/variety show Adivina qué hago esta noche
The Mosquito Coast	2021–2023	Apple TV+	co-production with Mr. Cross (2021) and Veritas Entertainment Group
Relatively Famous: Ranch Rules	2022	E!	
Señorita 89	2022–present	Pantaya; Starzplay	co-production with Fábula
About Last Night	2022	HBO Max	co-production with Sweet July Productions and Unanimous Media; Reboot of Tattletales and He Said She Said
America's Got Talent: Extreme	2022	NBC	co-production with Syco Entertainment
Five Guys a Week	2022	Lifetime	co-production with Original Productions
The Lincoln Project	2022	Showtime	international distributor; produced by The Othrs, Bloomfish Productions, and Impact Partners
Sullivan's Crossing	2023–present	CTV	co-production with Reel World Management and Bell Media
Fellow Travelers	2023	Showtime	miniseries; co-production with Blue Days Films, Off-Season Productions and Showtime Networks
Penelope	2024	Netflix	global distribution; produced by Duplass Brothers Productions
Mussolini: Son of the Century	2024–present	Sky Atlantic	co-production with Sky Studios, The Apartment Pictures, Pathé and Small Forward Productions

=== ACI ===
Programs produced by Hill/Fields and its predecessors, Tisch/Avnet Productions, Michael Jaffe Films, and Steve White Entertainment are currently distributed by Multicom Entertainment Group.

Title	Network	Years	Notes
Tucker's Witch	CBS	1982	produced by Hill/Mandelker Films
The Great Los Angeles Earthquake	NBC	1990	mini-series; produced by Von Zerneck Sertner Films
Angel Falls	CBS	1993	produced by The Konigsberg/Sanitsky Company
High Tide	Syndication	1994–1997	produced by Franklin/Waterman 2

=== All American Television ===
Title	Network	Years	Notes
America's Top 10	Syndication	1980–1992	Distributed by Gold Key Media until AATV was formed in 1982
Fridays	ABC	1980–1982	Distribution only Currently distributed by Shout! Studios and Retro Video
Wordplay	NBC	1986–1987	produced by Fiedler-Berlin Productions, Rick Ambrose Productions and Scotti Bros.-Syd Vinnedge Television
The Story of Rock 'n Roll	VH1	1987	produced by LBS Communications and Chelsea Communications
The Howard Stern Channel 9 Show	WWOR-TV	1990–1992	
Acapulco H.E.A.T.	M6/Syndication	1993–1994; 1997	produced by Balenciaga Productions, M6 Films, CNC, Les Films du Triangle, Film Groupe S. A. (1993–94), France Triangle Films (1996) and A Max Keller & Micheline Keller Presentation; Currently owned by Keller Entertainment Group
Beach Clash	Syndication	1994–1995	co-production with Taylorvision and First Media Entertainment
Sirens	Syndication	1994–1995	distribution for season 2 No longer distributed by Fremantle
The Richard Bey Show	Syndication	1995–1996	
Baywatch Nights	Syndication	1995–1997	co-production with The Baywatch Company, Tower 12 Productions and Tower 18 Production Company (1996–1997)
The Adventures of Sinbad	Global/Syndication	1996–1998	co-production with Alliance Atlantis and Canwest; Currently owned by Lionsgate Television and SP Media Group
Ghost Stories	Syndication	1997–1998	co-production with New Dominion Pictures

=== Goodson-Todman/Mark Goodson Productions ===
Title	Network	Years	Notes
Winner Take All	CBS; NBC	1948–1952	
Stop the Music	ABC	1949–1952; 1954–1956	in association with Louis Cowan Productions
The Web	CBS; NBC	1950–1954; 1957	
By Popular Demand	CBS	1950	
What's My Line?	CBS; Syndication	1950–1967; 1968–1975	1968–1975 episodes distributed by CBS Enterprises/Viacom
It's News to Me	CBS	1951–1954	
The Name's the Same	ABC	1951–1955	
Two for the Money	NBC; CBS	1952–1957	
Judge for Yourself	NBC	1953–1954	
What's Going On	ABC	1954	
Make the Connection	NBC	1955	
Choose Up Sides	CBS; NBC	1953 (pilot); 1956	
The Price Is Right	NBC; ABC	1956–1965	
Goodyear Theatre	NBC	1957–1960	
Play Your Hunch	CBS; ABC; NBC	1958–1963	
Jefferson Drum	NBC	1958	The show was also known as The Pen and the Quill
The Rebel	ABC	1959–1961	
Split Personality	NBC	1959–1960	
Philip Marlowe	ABC	1959–1960	co-production by California National Productions
One Happy Family	NBC	1961	
Say When!!	NBC	1961–1965	
Number Please	ABC	1961	
Missing Links	NBC; ABC	1963–1964	
The Richard Boone Show	NBC	1963–1964	
Get the Message	ABC	1964	
Call My Bluff	NBC	1965	
Branded	NBC	1965–1966	Currently owned by CBS Media Ventures
Snap Judgment	NBC	1967–1969	
The Don Rickles Show	ABC	1968–1969	
He Said, She Said	Syndication	1969–1970	
Concentration	Syndication	1973–1978	
Now You See It	CBS	1974–1975; 1989	
Tattletales	CBS; Syndication	1974–1978; 1982–1984	
Showoffs	ABC	1975	
Double Dare	CBS	1976–1977	
The Better Sex	ABC	1977–1978	
All-Star Family Feud Special	ABC	1978–1984	primetime specials
Mindreaders	NBC	1979–1980	
Password Plus	NBC	1979–1982	
That's My Line	CBS	1980–1981	
Blockbusters	NBC	1980–1982; 1987	
Child's Play	CBS	1982–1983	
The Match Game-Hollywood Squares Hour	NBC	1983–1984	co-production with Orion Television
Body Language	CBS	1984–1986	
Super Password	NBC	1984–1989	
Trivia Trap	ABC	1984–1985	
Classic Concentration	NBC	1987–1991	
Bonus Bonanza	Syndication (Massachusetts only)	1995-1998	continued by Jonathan Goodson Productions
Flamingo Fortune	Syndication (Florida only)	1995	continued by Jonathan Goodson Productions
Illinois Instant Riches	Syndication/WGN	1994-1996	continued by Jonathan Goodson Productions

=== Reg Grundy Productions ===
Title	Network	Years	Notes
Sale of the Century	NBC	1983–1989	
Scrabble	NBC	1984–1990; 1993	co-production with Exposure Unlimited
Time Machine	NBC	1985	
Bruce Forsyth's Hot Streak	ABC	1986	
Dangerous Women	Syndication	1991–1992	co-production with Central Independent Television
Scattergories	NBC	1993	
Small Talk	The Family Channel	1996–1997	

=== Original Productions ===
Title	Network	Years	Notes
Monster Garage	Discovery Channel	2002–2006	
Monster House	Discovery Channel	2003–2006	
Big!	Discovery Channel	2004	
Deadliest Catch	Discovery Channel	2005–present	
Ballroom Bootcamp	TLC	2005–2007	
Lobstermen: Jeopardy at Sea	Discovery Channel	2006–2013	
Ice Road Truckers	History	2007–2017	co-production with Shaw Media and Prospero Media
Lobster Wars	Discovery Channel	2007	
Ax Men	History	2008–2019	
Verminators	Discovery Channel	2008–2009	
1000 Ways to Die	Spike	2008–2012	
Black Gold	TruTV	2008–2013	
America's Toughest Jobs	NBC	2008	
PitchMen	Discovery Channel	2009–2011	
Swords: Life on the Line	Discovery Channel	2009–2012	
Motor City Motors	Discovery Channel	2009–2010	
1000 Ways to Lie	Spike	2010	
Storage Wars	A&E	2010–present	
Coal	Spike	2011	
Around the World in 80 Ways	History	2011	
American Hoggers	A&E	2011–2013	
Storage Wars: Texas	A&E	2011–2014	
Bering Sea Gold	Discovery	2012–present	
Alien Encounters	Science Channel	2012–2014	
Storage Wars: New York	A&E	2013	
Are You Tougher Than a Boy Scout?	National Geographic	2013	
The Legend of Shelby the Swamp Man	History	2013–2015	
Alaska Off-Road Warriors	History	2014–2015	
Barry'd Treasure	A&E	2014	
Brandi & Jarrod: Married to the Job	A&E	2014	
Storage Wars: Miami	A&E	2015	
Jay Leno's Garage	CNBC	2015–present	co-production with Big Dog Productions and Kitten Kaboodle
Badlands, Texas	National Geographic	2015–2016	
Deadliest Catch: Bloodline	Discovery	2020–2022	
Growing Belushi	Discovery	2020–2022	
Phat Tuesdays: The Era of Hip Hop Comedy	Amazon Prime Video	2022	co-production with Amazon Studios, Grammnet Productions and Phat Tuesday Productions
Five Guys A Week	Lifetime	2022	

=== Random House Studio ===
Title	Network	Years	Notes
Storybook Classics: The Velveteen Rabbit; The Ugly Duckling; The Elephant's Child; The Steadfast Tin Soldier	Direct-to-video	1985–1986	co-production with Rabbit Ears Productions
Richard Scarry's Best Videos Ever!	Direct-to-video	1989; 1993–1994	co-production with Jerry Lieberman Productions (1989) and Jumbo Pictures (1993–1994)
Heartland Table	Food Network	2013–2014	co-production with Tavola Productions

=== Passenger ===
Title	Years	Network	Notes
True Detective	2014–present	HBO	co-production with Parliament of Owls, Anonymous Content, Neon Black, HBO Entertainment and Peligrossa (season 4)
This England	2022	Sky Atlantic	co-production with Fremantle UK, Revolution Films and Sky Studios

== FremantleMedia Kids & Family Entertainment ==
Since January 2018, the FremantleMedia Kids & Family Entertainment assets have been owned by Boat Rocker Studios. Boat Rocker also owns children's programmes produced by Thames Television.

Title	Network	Years	Notes
Billy the Cat	Canal+ ZDF	1996–2001	Distribution since 2001; produced by EVA Entertainment, Les Films du Triangle, Dupuis, NOA Network of Animation, Sofidoc S.A., La Fabrique, Siriol Productions, Cologne Cartoon (season 1) and WIC Entertainment
Really Me	Family	2011–2013	co-production with Fresh TV and Really Me Productions
My Babysitter's a Vampire	Teletoon	2011–2012	co-production with Fresh TV
Monsuno	Nicktoons; TV Tokyo	2012–2014	co-production with Jakks Pacific, Dentsu Entertainment Inc., The Topps Company, Larx Entertainment and Nickelodeon Productions
Tree Fu Tom	CBeebies	2012–2016	co-production with CBeebies and Blue-Zoo Productions
The Aquabats! Super Show!	Hub Network	2012–2014	co-production with The Magic Store
Wizards vs Aliens	CBBC	2012–2014	co-production with BBC Cymru Wales
Ella the Elephant	TVOKids	2013–2014	co-production with DHX Cookie Jar Inc.
Alien Dawn	Nicktoons; TeenNick	2013–2014	co-production with Crook Brothers Productions and Larry Schwarz and His Band
Max Steel	Disney XD; Netflix	2013–2015	co-production with Nerd Corps Entertainment and Mattel Playground Productions
Grojband	Teletoon	2013–2015	co-production with Fresh TV and Neptoon Studios
Strange Hill High	CBBC	2013–2014	co-production with Factory Transmedia
Kate & Mim-Mim	CBeebies	2014–2018	co-production with Nerd Corps Entertainment (season 1) and DHX Media (season 2)
Danger Mouse	CBBC	2015–2019	continued by Boat Rocker Media from 2018; co-production with Boulder Media
Bitz & Bob	CBeebies	2018-2020	co-production with CBeebies Production and Jellyfish Pictures
The Who Was? Show	Netflix	2018	co-production with Tap that Maple, Penguin Random House and Matador Content

=== Animation Collective ===
As of September 2018, the Animation Collective library is distributed by Cake Entertainment.

- Leader Dog (2004)
- Tortellini Western (2004)
- Kappa Mikey (2006–2008)
- Thumb Wrestling Federation (2006–2010)
- Ellen's Acres (2006–2007)
- Dancing Sushi (2007)
- Three Delivery (2008–2009)

== Fremantle UK ==
Title	Network	Years	Notes
Gilslaine: Partner in Crime	Paramount+	2022	co-production with See It Now Studios
Suspect	Channel 4	2022–present	distribution; produced by Eagle Eye Drama
This England	Sky Atlantic	2022	co-production with Passenger, Revolution Films and Sky Studios
Alice & Jack	Channel 4 PBS	2024	co-production with Me + You Productions, Groundswell Productions, De Maio Entertainment and Masterpiece
The Iris Affair	Sky Atlantic	2025–present	co-production with Sky Studios
The Revenge Club	Paramount+	2025	co-production with Gaumont

=== Talkback ===
Title	Network	Years	Notes
Password	ITV; BBC Two; BBC One; Channel 4	1963; 1985–1988; 2024–present 1973; 1974–1976; 1982–1983	continued from ATV, Thames Television and Ulster Television
Through the Keyhole	ITV; Sky One; BBC One; BBC Two	1987–1995; 2013–2019; 1996; 1998–2004; 2006–2008	continued from Yorkshire Television and Paradine Productions
Bernard and the Genie	BBC One	1991	
Alas Smith and Jones	BBC One/BBC Two	1991–1998	
Murder Most Horrid	BBC Two	1991–1999	
Tales from the Poop Deck	ITV	1992	co-production with Central
Bonjour la Classe	BBC One	1993	
Demob	ITV	1993	co-production with Yorkshire
The Day Today	BBC Two	1994	
Paris	Channel 4	1994	
Knowing Me Knowing You with Alan Partridge	BBC Two	1994–1995	
Never Mind the Buzzcocks	BBC Two; Sky Max	1996–2015; 2021–present	
Blue Jam	BBC Radio 1	1997–1999	
Brass Eye	Channel 4	1997–2001	
I'm Alan Partridge	BBC Two	1997–2002	
The 11 O'Clock Show	Channel 4	1998–2000	
Big Train	BBC Two	1998–2002	
Smack the Pony	Channel 4	1999–2003	
Jam	Channel 4	2000	
Da Ali G Show	Channel 4 HBO	2000–2004	
Does Doug Know?	Channel 4	2002	
Liar	BBC Two	2002	
Your Face or Mine?	E4; Comedy Central	2002–2003; 2017–2019	
Look Around You	BBC Two	2002–2005	
Bo' Selecta!	Channel 4	2002–2009	
Gash	Channel 4	2003	
Design Wars	ITV	2003	
What Women Want	Channel 5	2003	
Distraction	Channel 4	2003–2004	
Monkey Dust	BBC Three	2003–2005	
QI	BBC Four/BBC Two/BBC One	2003–present	
Boxing Academy	Channel 5	2004	
Nathan Barley	Channel 4	2005	
Celebrity Juice	ITV2	2008–2022	continued from Talkback Thames
The Rob Brydon Show	BBC Two	2010–2012	continued from Talkback Thames
Keith Lemon's LemonAid	ITV	2012	
Unzipped	BBC Three	2012	
Lemon La Vida Loca	ITV2	2012–2013	
Sweat the Small Stuff	BBC Three	2013–2015	
Virtually Famous	E4	2014–2017	
Freeze Out	ITV	2015	
The Keith & Paddy Picture Show	ITV	2017–2018	
Shopping with Keith Lemon	ITV2	2019–present	co-production with Bang Tidy Productions
Too Hot to Handle	Netflix	2020–present	co-production with Thames
Alan Carr's Epic Gameshow	ITV	2020–2022	
Last Woman on Earth with Sara Pascoe	BBC Two	2020	
Let's Make a Love Scene	Channel 4	2022	
You Won't Believe This	Channel 4	2022	
Cheat	Netflix	2023	
Smart TV	Sky Max	2024–present	

==== Talkback Thames ====
Title	Network	Years	Notes
The Bill	ITV	1984–2010	continued from Thames Television
Going for Gold	BBC One; Channel 5	1987–1996; 2008–2009	continued from Reg Grundy Productions
They Think It's All Over?	BBC One	1995–2006	continued from Talkback
Farmer Wants a Wife	ITV; Channel 5	2001; 2009	continued from Thames Television
Property Ladder	Channel 4	2001–2009	continued from Talkback
How Clean Is Your House?	Channel 4	2003–2009	continued from Talkback
Green Wing	Channel 4	2004–2007	continued from Talkback
Gameshow Marathon	ITV	2005–2007	continued from Thames Television; co-production with ITV Productions
The Complete Guide to Parenting	ITV	2006	
The Sharon Osbourne Show	ITV	2006	
The Smith and Jones Sketchbook	BBC One	2006	
Manhunt – Solving Britain's Crimes	ITV	2006–2007	
PokerFace	ITV	2006–2007	co-production with Gallowgate
Grease Is the Word	ITV	2007	co-production with Syco TV
As the Bell Rings	Disney Channel	2007–2008	
Thank God You're Here	ITV	2008	
Hole in the Wall	BBC One	2008–2009	as Talkback Thames Scotland; co-production with BBC Scotland
Minder	Channel 5	2009	
Monday Monday	ITV	2009	
Toyboize	Dave	2009	
The King is Dead	BBC Three	2010	
Richard Bacon's Beer & Pizza Club	ITV4	2010–2011	

===== Alomo Productions =====
Title	Network	Years	Notes
Birds of a Feather	BBC One	1989–1998	
Nightingales	Channel 4	1990–1993	
Get Back	BBC One	1992–1993	
Goodnight Sweetheart	BBC One	1993–1999	
Hearts and Minds	Channel 4	1995	co-production with WitzEnd Productions
Grown Ups	BBC One	1997	
Unfinished Business	BBC One	1998–1999	
Believe Nothing	ITV	2002	

===== Regent Productions =====
Title	Network	Years	Notes
Fifteen to One	Channel 4	1988–2003; 2013–2019	continued by Remedy Productions and Argonon
Celebrity Fifteen to One	Channel 4	1990–1992; 2013–2015	continued by Remedy Productions and Argonon

=== Thames ===
Title	Network	Years	Notes
Blankety Blank	BBC One; ITV	1979–1999; 2020–present 2001–2002; 2016	continued from Fremantle (UK) Productions and Grundy
Family Fortunes	ITV	1980–2002; 2020–present	continued from ATV, Central and Carlton Television
Blockbusters	ITV; Sky One; BBC Two; Challenge; Comedy Central	1983–1993; 1994–1995; 2000–2001; 1997; 2012; 2019	continued from Central, Fremantle UK Productions and Grundy
The Price Is Right	ITV; Sky One; Channel 4	1984–1988; 1995–2007; 1989–1990; 2017	continued from Central, Talbot Telegame, Yorkshire Television, Fremantle (UK) Productions, Grundy and Talkback Thames
Supermarket Sweep	ITV/ITV2	1993–2007; 2020; 2019	continued from Central, Talbot Television, Fremantle (UK) Productions, Carlton Television, Grundy and Talkback Thames
The X Factor	ITV	2004–2018	continued from Talkback Thames; co-production with Syco Entertainment
The Xtra Factor	ITV2	2004–2016	continued from Talkback Thames; co-production with Syco Entertainment
All Star Family Fortunes	ITV	2006–2015	continued from Talkback Thames
Britain's Got Talent	ITV	2007–present	continued from Talkback Thames; co-production with Syco Entertainment
Take Me Out	ITV	2010–2019	continued from Talkback Thames
The Talent Show Story	ITV	2012	co-production with Shiver Productions
Let's Get Gold	ITV	2012	co-production with Superhero TV
1001 Things You Should Know	Channel 4	2012–2013	as Thames Scotland
Break the Safe	BBC One	2013–2014	co-production with BBC Scotland
Rebound	ITV	2015–2016	
Bang on the Money	ITV	2016	
Baewatch: Parental Guidance	E4	2019	
The Greatest Dancer	BBC One	2019–2020	co-production with Syco Entertainment
Too Hot to Handle	Netflix	2020–present	co-production with Talkback
Game of Talents	ITV	2021	
I Can See Your Voice	BBC One	2021–2022	co-production with Naked (series 1)
The Who Cares Wins Awards with The Sun	Channel 4	2021–present	
The Real Dirty Dancing	E4	2022	
Mamma Mia! I Have a Dream	ITV	2023	

==== Thames Television ====
Title	Network	Years	Notes
Take Your Pick!	ITV	1955–1999	continued from Associated-Rediffusion
Best of Enemies	ITV	1968–1969	continued from Associated-Rediffusion
Father, Dear Father	ITV	1968–1973	
Magpie	ITV	1968–1980	
The Sooty Show	ITV	1968–1992	
Dear Mother...Love Albert	ITV	1969	
Do Not Adjust Your Set	ITV	1969	
A Present for Dickie	ITV	1969–1970	
Two in Clover	ITV	1969–1970	
Never Mind the Quality, Feel the Width	ITV	1969–1971	
The Benny Hill Show	ITV	1969–1989	
This Is Your Life	ITV; BBC One	1969–2003	
For the Love of Ada	ITV	1970–1971	
Ace of Wands	ITV	1970–1972	
Looks Familiar	ITV; Channel 4	1970–1983; 1984–1987	
Tottering Towers	ITV	1971–1972	
Bless This House	ITV	1971–1976	
Alcock and Gander	ITV	1972	
Pardon My Genie	ITV	1972–1973	
Thirty Minutes Worth	ITV	1972–1973	
Love Thy Neighbour	ITV	1972–1976	
Whodunnit?	ITV	1972–1978	
Rainbow	ITV	1972–1992	
Robert's Robots	ITV	1973–1974	
Sally and Jake	ITV	1973–1974	co-production with Cosgrove Hall Productions
The World at War	ITV	1973–1974	
Man About the House	ITV	1973–1976	
There Goes That Song Again	ITV	1973–1977	
The Tomorrow People	ITV	1973–1979	
Michael Bentine's Potty Time	ITV	1973–1980	
Whose Baby?	ITV	1973–1988	
My Name Is Harry Worth	ITV	1974	
Moody and Pegg	ITV	1974–1975	
...And Mother Makes Five	ITV	1974–1976	
The Molly Wopsies	ITV	1974–1976	
Quick on the Draw	ITV	1974–1979	
Paperplay	ITV	1974–1981	
Wish You Were Here...?	ITV	1974–2003	
Sadie, It's Cold Outside	ITV	1975	
Get Some In!	ITV	1975–1978	
Shadows	ITV	1975–1978	
The Crezz	ITV	1976	
The Howerd Confessions	ITV	1976	
Chorlton and the Wheelies	ITV	1976–1979	co-production with Cosgrove Hall Productions
Jamie and the Magic Torch	ITV	1976–1979	co-production with Cosgrove Hall Productions
George and Mildred	ITV	1976–1979	
Name That Tune	ITV	1976–1988	
Odd Man Out	ITV	1977	
Grandma Bricks of Swallow Street	ITV	1977–1978	co-production with Cosgrove Hall Productions
Miss Jones and Son	ITV	1977–1978	
Robin's Nest	ITV	1977–1981	
The Kenny Everett Video Show	ITV	1978–1981	
Fanfare for Young Musicians	ITV	1978–1982	
The Morecambe & Wise Show	ITV	1978–1983	
Rumpole of the Bailey	ITV	1978–1992	
Chalk and Cheese	ITV	1979	
The Ken Dodd Laughter Show	ITV	1979	
Room Service	ITV	1979	
Shelley	ITV	1979–1992	
Cowboys	ITV	1980	
Hollywood	ITV	1980	
Keep It in the Family	ITV	1980–1983	
Play Your Cards Right	ITV	1980–2003	continued from LWT, Fremantle UK Productions and Grundy
Cockleshell Bay	ITV	1980–1986	co-production with Cosgrove Hall Productions
Button Moon	ITV	1980–1988	
Sorry, I'm a Stranger Here Myself	ITV	1981–1982	
It Takes a Worried Man	ITV; Channel 4	1981–1983	
Never the Twain	ITV	1981–1991	
Danger Mouse	ITV	1981–1992	co-production with Cosgrove Hall Productions
A.J. Wentworth, B.A.	ITV	1982	
Let There Be Love	ITV	1982–1983	
Tom, Dick and Harriet	ITV	1982–1983	
Up the Elephant and Round the Castle	ITV	1983–1985	
The Wind in the Willows	ITV	1983–1988	co-production with Cosgrove Hall Productions
Des O'Connor Tonight	ITV	1983–2002	co-production with Talkback
Hollywood or Bust	ITV	1984	
The Lonelyhearts Kid	ITV	1984	
The Steam Video Company	ITV	1984	
Tripper's Day	ITV	1984	
Chance in a Million	Channel 4	1984–1986	
Chocky	ITV	1984–1986	
Fresh Fields	ITV	1984–1986	
What's My Line?	ITV	1984–1990	
Mann's Best Friends	Channel 4	1985	
Moving	ITV	1985	
The Secret Diary of Adrian Mole, Aged 13¾	ITV	1985	
Alias the Jester	ITV	1985–1986	co-production with Cosgrove Hall Productions
Full House	ITV	1985–1986	
All in Good Faith	ITV	1985–1988	
We'll Think of Something	ITV	1986	
All at No 20	ITV	1986–1987	
Slinger's Day	ITV	1986–1987	
Executive Stress	ITV	1986–1988	
Creepy Crawlies	ITV	1987–1989	
Ffizz	ITV	1987–1989	
Headliners	ITV	1987–1989	
Home James!	ITV	1987–1990	
Andy Capp	ITV	1988	
After Henry	ITV	1988–1992	
Count Duckula	ITV	1988–1993	co-production with Cosgrove Hall Productions
Take the Plunge	ITV	1989	
The Labours of Erica	ITV	1989–1990	
Everybody's Equal	ITV	1989–1991	co-production with Celador
French Fields	ITV	1989–1991	
Oh, Mr. Toad	ITV	1990	co-production with Cosgrove Hall Productions
No Job for a Lady	ITV	1990–1992	
Spatz	ITV	1990–1992	
Victor and Hugo	ITV	1991–1992	co-production with Cosgrove Hall Productions
Land of Hope and Gloria	ITV	1992	
Me, You and Him	ITV	1992	
Terry Pratchett's Truckers	ITV	1992	
Your Number Please	ITV	1992	co-production with Atticus Television
Men Behaving Badly	ITV; BBC One	1992; 1994–1998	co-production with Hartswood Films
The Brian Conley Show	ITV	1992–2002	continued from LWT
Heroes of Comedy	Channel 4	1992–2003	
Law and Disorder	Channel 4	1994	co-production with Central
Fluke	Channel 4	1997	
Night Fever	Channel 5	1997–2002	continued from Grundy
Family Affairs	Channel 5	1997–2005	
Fort Boyard	Channel 5	1998–2001	continued from Grundy
Open House with Gloria Hunniford	Channel 5	1998–2003	
Mystic Challenge	Living	2000–2001	
Pop Idol	ITV	2001–2003	co-production with 19 Entertainment
Hardware	ITV	2003–2004	

===== Reeves Entertainment =====
Title	Network	Years	Notes
The Kids From C.A.P.E.R.	NBC	1976–1977	U.S. distribution by NBCUniversal Syndication Studios
In Search of...	Syndication	1977–1982	U.S. distribution by NBCUniversal Syndication Studios
Between the Wars	Mobil Showcase Network	1978	
The Chisholms	CBS	1979–1980	
That's Incredible!	ABC	1980–1984	U.S. distribution by NBCUniversal Syndication Studios
Those Amazing Animals	ABC	1980–1981	U.S. distribution by NBCUniversal Syndication Studios
The Krypton Factor	ABC	1981	in association with MCA Television Enterprises
Gimme a Break!	NBC	1981–1987	U.S. distribution by NBCUniversal Syndication Studios
No Soap, Radio	ABC	1982	co-production with The Alexander Smith Company and Mort Lachman & Associates
Baby Makes Five	ABC	1983	
Life's Most Embarrassing Moments	ABC; Syndication	1983–1986; 1988–1989	
The Pop 'N Rocker Game	Syndication	1983–1984	co-production with MCA TV and Ron Greenberg Productions
Kennedy	NBC	1983	mini-series; co-production with Central Independent Television
Kate & Allie	CBS	1984–1989	U.S. distribution by NBCUniversal Syndication Studios
Spencer	NBC	1984–1985	co-production with Mort Lachman and Associates
I Married Dora	ABC	1987–1988	co-production with Welladay Inc. distributed by Sony Pictures Television
The Thorns	ABC	1988	
The Home Show	ABC	1988–1994	Produced by New World Television from 1993 to 1994
Doctor Doctor	CBS	1989–1991	U.S. distribution by Sony Pictures Television
Jackpot!	Syndication	1989–1990	co-production with Bob Stewart Productions; Currently owned by Sony Pictures Television
Wild & Crazy Kids	Nickelodeon	1990–1992	co-production with Nickelodeon Productions and Woody Fraser Productions co-owned with Paramount Global Content Distribution
What Would You Do?	Nickelodeon	1991–1993	co-production with Nickelodeon Productions and Woody Fraser Productions co-owned with Paramount Global Content Distribution
Covington Cross	ABC	1992	
The Tomorrow People	ITV; Nickelodeon	1992–1995	Produced by Tetra Films in association with Thames Television
Homicide: Life on the Street	NBC	1993	season 1 only seasons 1-6 co-distributed with NBCUniversal Syndication Studios

===== Euston Films =====
Title	Years	Network	Notes
Special Branch	1969–1974	ITV	co-production with Thames Television
Van der Valk	1972–1973; 1977; 1991–1992	ITV	co-production with Thames Television
The Sweeney	1975–1978	ITV	co-production with Thames Television
Danger UXB	1979	ITV	co-production with Thames Television
Quatermass	1979	ITV	co-production with Thames Television
Minder	1979–1994	ITV	co-production with Thames Television (1979–1991) and Central (1993–1994)
Fox	1980	ITV	co-production with Thames Television
Widows	1983–1985	ITV	
Reilly, Ace of Spies	1983	ITV	
King and Castle	1985–1988	ITV	co-production with Thames Television
Prospects	1986	Channel 4	
Jack the Ripper	1988	ITV/CBS	miniseries; co-production with Thames Television, Hill-O'Connor Television and Lorimar-Telepictures
Selling Hitler	1991	ITV	co-production with Thames Television and Warner Sisters Productions
Hard Sun	2018	BBC One/Hulu	
Dublin Murders	2019	BBC One/RTÉ/Starz	co-production with Element Pictures and Veritas Entertainment Group
Baghdad Central	2020	Channel 4	
The Sister	2020	ITV	
Wreck	2022–present	BBC Three	
Nightsleeper	2024	BBC One	

=== Naked ===
Title	Network	Years	Notes
Grand Designs	Channel 4	1999–present	as Naked West continued from Talkback, Talkback Thames and Boundless
Escape to the Country	BBC One	2002–present	as Naked West continued from Thames Television, Talkback Thames and Boundless
The Apprentice	BBC Two/BBC One	2005–present	continued from Talkback Thames and Boundless co-production with Mark Burnett Productions/United Artists Media Group/MGM Television
The Apprentice: You're Fired!	BBC Three/BBC Two	2006–present	continued from Talkback Thames and Boundless co-production with Mark Burnett Productions/United Artists Media Group/MGM Television
Great British Railway Journeys	BBC Two	2010–2021	continued from Talkback Thames and Boundless
Great Continental Railway Journeys	BBC Two	2012–present	
Great American Railroad Journeys	BBC Two	2016–present	
Britain's Best Boy Racer	All 4	2016	
Threesome Dating	All 4	2016	
100% Hotter	5Star	2016–2018	
My Hotter Half	E4	2017–2018	
Secret Admirer	Channel 5	2018	
Secret Crush	Bravo	2018	
Indian Summer School	Channel 4	2018	
60 Days on the Streets	Channel 4	2019	
21 Again	BBC One	2019	
The Day I Picked My Parents	A&E	2019	
The Rap Game UK	BBC Three	2019–present	
The Chasers Road Trip	ITV	2021	co-production with Sent Entertainment
Secret Crush	ITV2	2021–present	
The Killer Nanny: Did She Do It?	Channel 4	2022	
Great Coastal Railway Journeys	BBC Two	2022–present	
60 Days with the Gypsies	Channel 4	2022	
Snowflake Mountain	Netflix	2022	
Planet Sex with Cara Delevinge	BBC Three; Hulu	2022–2023	co-production with Milkshake Productions
60 Days on the Estates	Channel 4	2023	
Buying London	Netflix	2024	
Hot Mess Summer	Amazon Prime Video	2024	
Couple to Throuple	Peacock	2024	

==== Boundless ====
Title	Network	Years	Notes
House Doctor	Channel 5	1998–2003; 2016	continued from Talkback
Young Apprentice	BBC One	2010–2012	continued from Talkback Thames co-production with Mark Burnett Productions
Four Rooms	Channel 4/More4	2011–2019	continued from Talkback Thames
Escape to the Continent	BBC Two/BBC One	2014–2015	
An Hour to Save Your Life	BBC Two	2014–2016	
My Kitchen Rules	Sky Living/Channel 4	2014–2017	continued by 7Wonder
The Secrets in My Family	W	2017	
Great Indian Railway Journeys	BBC Two	2018	
Great Alaskan Railroad Journeys	BBC Two	2019	
Great Canadian Railway Journeys	BBC Two	2019	
Great Australian Railway Journeys	BBC Two	2019	
Great Asian Railway Journeys	BBC Two	2020	

=== Hare and Tortoise ===
Title	Network	Years	Notes
The IT Crowd	Channel 4	2006–2013	continued from Talkback Thames; co-production with Delightful Industries
PhoneShop	E4	2010–2013	continued from Talkback Thames
Count Arthur Strong	BBC One; BBC Two	2013; 2015–2017	co-production with Komedia Entertainment and Delightful Industries
Birds of a Feather	ITV	2014–2020	co-production with Quirkymedia Stuff
Chewing Gum	E4	2015–2017	

=== Reg Grundy Productions ===
Title	Network	Years	Notes
Sale of the Century	ITV; Sky One; Challenge TV	1971–1983; 1989–1991; 1997	continued from Anglia Television
Celebrity Squares	ITV	1975–1979; 1993–1997; 2014–2015	continued from ATV co-production with Central Independent Television continued by September Films
Give Us a Clue	ITV; BBC One	1979–1992; 1997	continued from Thames Television
Jeopardy!	Channel 4 ITV; Sky One	1983–1984; 1990–1993; 2024–present 1995–1996	continued from Thames Television co-production with TVS and Meridian continued by Action Time, Columbia Tristar Television, KingWorld Productions and Whisper North
Strike It Lucky	ITV	1986–1999	continued from Thames Television and Fremantle UK Productions co-production with LWT
Tanamera – Lion of Singapore	Central	1989	co-production with Central Independent Television
Sky Star Search	Sky One	1989–1991	
Keynotes	ITV	1989–1992	co-production with HTV West
Press Your Luck	HTV	1991–1992	
The Main Event	BBC One	1993	
Pot of Gold	ITV	1993–1995	
Small Talk	BBC One	1994–1996	
Man O Man	ITV	1996–1999	co-production with Angila (series 1)
Whittle	Channel 5	1997	
100%	Channel 5	1997–2001	
Would I Lie To You?	ITV	1998–1999	piloted in 1998 as Truth or Consequences
Win Beadle's Money	Channel 5	1999	
Grudge Match	ITV	1999–2000	
One to Win	Channel 5	2000	
The Desert Forges	Channel 5	2001	
Greed	Channel 5	2001	

=== Newman Street ===
Title	Years	Network	Notes
Suspects	2014–2016	Channel 5	

=== Dancing Ledge Productions ===
Title	Years	Network	Notes
The Salisbury Poisonings	2020	BBC One	
The Responder	2022–present	BBC One	
Wedding Season	2022–present	Disney+	co-production with Jax Media
Crossfire	2022	BBC One	co-production with Buddy Club Productions
Platform 7	2023	ITVX	
Big Mood	2024	Channel 4	

== Fremantle Australia ==
Title	Years	Network	Notes
The Price is Right	1973–1974; 1981–1985; 1989; 1993–1998; 2003–2005; 2012	Network 10; Seven Network; Nine Network	continued from Grundy Television
Neighbours	1985–2025	Seven Network/Network 10/10 Peach; Amazon Freevee	continued from Grundy Television co-production with Amazon Studios from 2023 to 2025
Shortland Street	1992–present	TVNZ 2	continued from Grundy Television co-production with South Pacific Pictures
The X Factor Australia	2005–2016	Nine Network/Seven Network	
Temptation	2005–2009	Nine Network	inherited from Grundy Television
Bert's Family Feud	2006–2007	Nine Network	inherited from Grundy Television
The Biggest Loser	2006–2010	Network 10	continued from Crackerjack Productions; Future seasons are produced by Endemol Shine Australia until 2017
Nerds FC	2006–2007	SBS	
Australia's Got Talent	2007–present	Seven Network/Nine Network; TVNZ	co-production with Syco Entertainment
The Farmer Wants a Wife	2007–present	Nine Network/Seven Network	co-production with Eureka Productions
So You Think You Can Dance Australia	2008–2010	Network 10	
Comedy Slapdown	2008	The Comedy Channel	
Taken Out	2008–2009	Network 10	replaced by Take Me Out and moved to Seven Network from 2018
Ultimate School Musical	2008	Fox8	
Power of 10	2008	Nine Network	co-production with Sony Pictures Television International
So You Think You Can Dance Australia	2008–2010	Network 10	
Project Runway Australia	2008–2012	Arena	
The Apprentice Australia	2009	Nine Network	
Double Take	2009	Seven Network	
MasterChef Australia	2009–2011	Network 10	Future seasons are produced by Endemol Shine Australia
Celebrity MasterChef Australia	2009	Network 10	Future seasons are produced by Endemol Shine Australia
Annabel Langbein: The Free Range Cook	2010–2014	TVNZ 1	Produced as FremantleMedia Enterprises co-production with Screentime and Annabel Langbein Media
Grand Designs Australia	2010–present	LifeStyle Channel	
The Celebrity Apprentice Australia	2011–2015	Nine Network	co-production with United Artists Media Group; Future seasons are produced by Warner Bros. International Television Production and MGM Television until 2022
It's a Knockout	2011–2012	Network 10	produced by Spring
Everybody Dance Now	2012	Network 10	
Bindi's Bootcamp	2012–2015	ABC3	co-production with Sticky Pictures
The Mole	2013	Seven Network	
Mr & Mrs Murder	2013	Network 10	co-production with Bravado Productions
Wentworth	2013–2021	SoHo/Fox Showcase	
The X Factor New Zealand	2013–2015	TV3	
Family Feud Australia	2014–2020	Network 10	
Dancing with the Stars Australia	2014–2015	Seven Network	
The Great Australian Bake Off	2015–2019	LifeStyle Food; LifeStyle	Future seasons are produced by BBC Studios Australia
Family Feud New Zealand	2016–2017	Three	
Picnic at Hanging Rock	2018	Fox Showcase	
Take Me Out	2018	Seven Network	formerly named Taken Out and broadcast by Network Ten, since 2008–2009
Lie With Me	2021	Network 10/Channel 5	
The PM's Daughter	2022–present	ABC Me	
Rock Island Mysteries	2022–present	10 Shake	
Inside the Sydney Opera House	2022	ABC	
Heartbreak High	2022–present	Netflix	co-production with NewBe
Riptide	2022	Network 10/Channel 5	
Wellmania	2023–present	Netflix	co-production with Nondescript Productions
Totally Completely Fine	2023–present	Stan/SundanceNow	
Bay of Fires	2023	ABC	co-production with Archipelago Productions
C*A*U*G*H*T	2023	Stan	

=== Grundy Television ===
Title	Network	Years	Notes
Concentration	Nine Network/Seven Network	1959–1967; 1970	
Take the Hint	Nine Network	1962–1966	
Keynotes	Nine Network	1964; 1992–1993	
Personality Squares	Network 10	1967-1969; 1981	
Great Temptation	Seven Network	1970-1974	
Password	Network 10	1973	
Class of 74	Seven Network	1974–1975	
Until Tomorrow	Seven Network	1975–1976	
The Young Doctors	Nine Network	1976–1983	
Chopper Squad	Network 10	1976–1979	
Blankety Blanks	Network 10	1977–1978	
Glenview High	Seven Network	1977–1979	
The Restless Years	Network 10	1977–1981	
Family Feud Australia	Nine Network; Seven Network	1978–1984; 1990–1996	
Prisoner	Network Ten	1979–1986	
Sale of the Century	Nine Network	1980–2001	
Secret Valley	ABC	1980	co-production with Telecip, S.A.
Punishment	Network 10	1981	
Bellamy	Network 10	1981	
Wheel of Fortune	Seven Network	1981–2006	
Match Mates	Nine Network	1981–1982	
Taurus Rising	Seven Network	1982	
Sons and Daughters	Seven Network	1982–1987	
Starting Out	Nine Network	1983	
Waterloo Station	Nine Network	1983–1984	
Perfect Match	Network Ten/Seven Network	1984–1989; 2002	
Possession	Nine Network	1985	
It's a Knockout	Network Ten	1985–1987	
Richmond Hill	Network Ten	1988	
Embassy	ABC	1990–1992	
Bony	Seven Network	1990–1992	
The Other Side of Paradise	Network 10	1992	mini-series
Mission Top Secret	Network 10	1992–1995	
Man O Man	Seven Network	1994	
Who Wants to Be a Millionaire?	Nine Network	1999–2006	
Cash Bonanza	Nine Network	2001	
Escape of the Artful Dodger	Nine Network	2001	
El rival más débil (Mexican version of The Weakest Link)	Azteca Trece	2003–2008	distributed by BBC Worldwide, and co-production with Azteca

=== Crackerjack Productions ===
Title	Network	Years	Notes
BackBerner	ABC	1999–2002	
So Fresh TV	Nine Network	2002–2006	
CNNNN	ABC	2002–2003	co-production with Zapruder's Other Films
Comedy Inc.	Nine Network	2003–2007	
Australia's Brainiest	Network Ten	2004–2006	
Quizmania	Nine Network	2006–2007	
As the Bell Rings	Disney Channel	2007–2011	continued by FremantleMedia Australia
Newstopia	SBS One	2007–2008	

=== Eureka Productions ===
Programs with a shaded background indicate the program is still in production.

Title	Network	Years	Notes
The Employables	SBS	2016	
The Chefs' Line	SBS	2017–2018	
Behave Yourself	Seven Network	2017–2020	
The Voice Australia	Nine Network/Seven Network	2017–present	Co-production with ITV Studios Australia; season 6 onwards. Earlier Nine Network iteration co-produced by Talpa Media Group and Shine Australia.
The Single Wives	Seven Network	2018	
Pick, Flip and Drive	Facebook Watch	2018	
Australian Spartan	Seven Network	2018–2019	
The Launch	CTV (Canada)	2018–2019	Co-production with Bell Media and Insight Productions
Drunk History Australia	Network 10	2018–2020	
Crikey! It's the Irwins	Animal Planet; Discovery+	2018–2022	
Thrones 360	Foxtel	2019	
The Real Dirty Dancing	Seven Network	2019	
Deadly Cults	Oxygen (United States)	2019–2020	co-production with The Intellectual Property Corporation
Dating Around	Netflix	2019–2020	
Holey Moley	ABC (United States)	2019–2022	Co-production with Unanimous Media
The Amazing Race Australia	Network 10	2019–present	Season 4 onwards. Earlier Seven Network iteration produced by Active TV (seasons 1 & 2) and Seven Productions (season 3).
The Farmer Wants a Wife	Seven Network	2020–present	Co-production with Fremantle Australia; primary producer from Season 10 onwards
Full Bloom	HBO Max	2020–2021	
Finding Magic Mike	HBO Max	2021	Co-production with Warner Horizon Unscripted Television
Frogger	Peacock	2021	Co-production with Konami Cross Media NY
Holey Moley (Australia)	Seven Network	2021	Co-production with Unanimous Media.
Making It Australia	Network 10	2021	Co-production with Matchbox Pictures
Name That Tune	Fox (United States)	2021	Co-production with Prestige Entertainment and Fox Alternative Entertainment. Filmed in Sydney for the U.S. market. Subsequent seasons were co-produced by BiggerStage, Prestige and Fox Alternative Entertainment and filmed in Ireland.
Twenty Somethings: Austin	Netflix	2021	
Luxe Listings Sydney	Amazon Prime Video	2021–2022	co-production with Amazon Studios and Kentel Entertainment
Parental Guidance	Nine Network	2021–2025	
Byron Baes	Netflix	2022	Co-production with Superreal.
Kitchen Nightmares Australia	Seven Network	2022	
The Real Dirty Dancing (United States)	Fox (United States)	2022	Co-production with Lionsgate Television; Based on the Australian series of the same name.
The Real Love Boat (Australia)	Network 10	2022	
The Real Love Boat (United States)	CBS/Paramount+	2022	
The Parent Test	ABC (United States)	2022–2023	Co-production with Walt Disney Television Alternative. Based on the Australian series Parental Guidance
The Mole (United States)	Netflix	2022–2024	Earlier ABC iteration produced by Stone Stanley Entertainment.
Million Dollar Island	Seven Network	2023	
Stars on Mars	Fox (United States)	2023	
Australian Idol	Seven Network	2023–present	Previous seasons on Network 10 co-produced by FremantleMedia Australia and 19 Entertainment.
Farmer Wants a Wife	Fox (United States)	2023–present	Previous seasons on The CW produced by FremantleMedia North America and Super Delicious Productions.
The Floor	Fox (United States)	2024–present	Co-production with Talpa and BiggerStage
The Quiz with Balls	Fox (United States)	2024–present	Co-production with Talpa
Restoration Australia	ABC	2024–present	Co-production with Fremantle Australia; primary producer from Season 6 onwards
Grand Designs Australia	ABC	2024–present	Co-production with Fremantle Australia; primary producer from Season 11 onwards
The Secret DNA of Us	SBS	2025–present	
The Floor (Australia)	Nine Network	2025–present	Co-production with Talpa
KPopped	Apple TV+	2025–present	Co-production with CJ ENM
Grand Designs Transformations	ABC	2026–present	Season 2 onwards; inherited from FremantleMedia Australia.
Wonka's The Golden Ticket	Netflix	2026–present	
Caught in the Middle	Seven Network	2027–present	Co-production with Talpa
Stacks of Cash (Australia)	Seven Network	2027–present	
Stacks of Cash (United States)	CBS	2027–present	
The Masked Singer (United States)	Fox (United States)	2027–present	Season 15 onwards. Earlier seasons produced by Endemol Shine North America (season 1), Fox Alternative Entertainment (seasons 2–13) and Fox Entertainment Studios (season 14).

=== Fremantle Telegames (All-American Fremantle International/Becker Entertainment) ===
Title	Years	Network	Notes
Child's Play	1984	Seven Network	
Now You See It	1985-1993; 1998-2000	Seven Network/Nine Network	
The Newlywed Game	1987	Nine Network	
Let's Make a Deal	1991	Network 10	
Blockbusters	1991-1994	Seven Network	
Supermarket Sweep	1992-1994	Nine Network	
Strike It Lucky	1994	Nine Network	
Total Recall	1994-1995	Seven Network	
Concentration	1997	Seven Network	

== Fremantle Italy ==
Title	Years	Network	Notes
X Factor	2008–present	Rai Due/Sky Uno	
Italia's Got Talent	2009–present	Canale 5/Sky Uno/Disney+	co-production with Syco Entertainment

=== Wildside ===
Title	Years	Network	Notes
The Young Pope	2016	Sky Atlantic; HBO; Canal+	co-production with Haut Et Court TV and Mediapro
My Brilliant Friend	2018–2024	HBO; Rai 1	co-production with The Apartment Pictures, Fandango, Umedia and Mowe
The New Pope	2020	Sky Atlantic; HBO; Canal+	co-production with The Apartment Pictures, Haut Et Court TV, Mediapro and Sky Studios
We Are Who We Are	2020	HBO; Sky Atlantic	co-production with The Apartment Pictures, Small Forward and Sky Studios
Anna	2021	Sky Italia; Arte	co-production with Kwaï and The New Life Company
Bang Bang Baby	2022–present	Amazon Prime Video	co-production with The Apartment Pictures
The Good Mothers	2023–present	Disney+	co-production with House Productions

== Monster ==
Title	Years	Network	Notes
Idol - Jakten på en superstjerne	2003–2007	TV 2	
Skal vi danse?	2006–2019	TV 2	
Alt for Norge	2010–2019	TVNorge	
Borderliner	2017	TV 2	
The Oslo Killing	2019	TVNorge	
Estonia	2020–2022	Discovery+	
Valpeskolen	2021–present	NRK	
Pørni	2021–present	Viaplay	
Nede	2022	Viaplay	

== Television movies and specials ==
=== Fremantle North America ===
- The Great Halloween Fright Fight (2014)
- Double Dare at the Super Bowl (2019) (co-production with Nickelodeon Productions)

==== All-American Television ====
- The Elvis Conspiracy (1992)
- The JFK Conspiracy (1992)
- The Kennedy Assassinations: Coincidence or Conspiracy? (1992) (co-production with George Paige Associates)
- The Royal Family: In Crisis (1992)
- Madonna: Exposed (1993)
- The Price of Fame (1993)
- The Royal Soap Opera (1996) (co-production with Beauchamp Place Communications)
- "Weird Al" Yankovic: There's No Going Home (1996)

==== LBS Communications ====
- Return to the Titanic...Live (October 28, 1987) (co-production with Westgate Communications)
- Crazy About The Movies: Forever James Dean (February 8, 1988) (produced by Chelsea Communications)
- Exploring Psychic Powers...Live (1989)
- The Billy Martin Celebrity Roast (September 30, 1989) (co-production with Multiview Productions)

==== ACI ====
Title	Airdate	Network	Notes
Summer Dreams: The Story of the Beach Boys	April 29, 1990	ABC	produced by Leonard Hill Films
Lies Before Kisses	March 3, 1991	CBS	produced by Grossbart Barnett Productions and Spectacor Films
White Hot: The Mysterious Murder of Thelma Todd	May 5, 1991	NBC	produced by Neufeld-Keating Productions, Sandy Hook Productions and Von Zerneck-Sertner Films
In Sickness and in Health	March 8, 1992	CBS	produced by the Konigsberg/Sanitsky Company
Calendar Girl, Cop, Killer? The Bambi Bembenek Story	May 18, 1992	ABC	produced by Frank & Bob Films II and Von Zerneck-Sertner Films
In the Deep Woods	October 26, 1992	NBC	produced by Frederic Golchan Productions and Leonard Hill Films
Amy Fisher: My Story	December 28, 1992	NBC	produced by Jaffe/Braunstein Films, KLM Productions and Spectacor Films
Snowbound: The Jim and Jennifer Stolpa Story	January 9, 1994	CBS	produced by Pacific Motion Pictures, Jaffe/Braunstein Films and Spectacor Films
Mortal Fear	November 20, 1994	NBC	produced by Von Zerneck-Sertner Films
The Other Woman	March 26, 1995	CBS	co-production with Patricia K. Meyer Productions and Von Zerneck Sertner Films
The Killing Secret	January 6, 1997	NBC	co-production with Robert Greenwald Productions
Touched By Evil	January 12, 1997	ABC	co-production with Media Arts Management and Vin Di Bona Productions
...First Do No Harm	February 16, 1997	ABC	co-production with Pebblehut Productions and Jaffe/Braunstein Films
All the Winters That Have Been	September 21, 1997	CBS	produced by Jaffe/Braunstein Films and Maili Point Productions
I'll Be Home for Christmas	December 23, 1997	CBS	co-production with Pebblehut Productions and Jaffe/Braunstein Films
My Father's Shadow: The Sam Sheppard Story	November 17, 1998	CBS	produced by Jaffe/Braunstein Films

==== Mark Goodson Productions ====
- What's My Line at 25 (1975)
- TV's Funniest Game Show Moments (1984)
- TV's Funniest Game Show Moments #2 (1985)

=== Random House Studio ===
Title	Network	Years	Notes
The Story of Babar the Little Elephant	NBC	October 21, 1968	co-production with Lee Mendelson Film Productions and Bill Melendez Productions
The Country Mouse and the City Mouse: A Christmas Tale	HBO	December 8, 1993	co-production with Michael Sporn Animation

=== Fremantle UK ===
==== Talkback ====
- Sword of Honour (2001)
- The Best of Boart (2001)
- Shoreditch Twat (2002)
- Anglian Lives with Alan Partridge (2003)

==== Talkback Thames ====
- Poisoned (2005)
- Friends and Crocodiles (2006)
- Gideon's Daughter (2006) (co-production with Spotlight Films)
- When Kim & Aggie Went to Hospital (2006)
- The Yellow House (2007)
- Joe's Palace (2007) (co-production with HBO Films)
- Capturing Mary (2007) (co-production with HBO Films)
- 'Neighbours' on Five (2008)
- The Shooting of Thomas Hurndall (2008)
- The Bill Made Me Famous (2008) (co-production with Mentorn Media)
- Kirsten's Topless Ambition (2009)
- I Dreamed a Dream: The Susan Boyle Story (2009) (co-production with Syco Entertainment)
- Farewell 'The Bill' (2010)
- Paddy McGuinness' Walk the Line (2011)
- QI Genesis (2011) (co-production with Quite Interesting Limited)
- Holy Flying Circus (2011) (co-production with HillBilly Television)

==== Thames Television ====
- A Performance of Macbeth (1979)
- The Plank (1979)
- The Crazy World of Benny Hill (1988)
- Waldheim: A Commission of Inquiry (1988)
- Harold Lloyd: The Third Genius (1990)
- Lorna Doone (1990)
- The Treaty (1991) (co-production with RTÉ)
- Gawain and the Green Knight (1991)
- Guilt or Innocence: The Trial of James Earl Ray (1993)

==== Reeves Entertainment ====
Title	Airdate	Network	Notes
Love with a Twist	January 28, 1990	ABC	

==== Euston Films ====
- The Naked Civil Servant (1975)
- Charlie Muffin (1979)
- The Knowledge (1979)
- Stainless Steel and the Star Spies (1981)

=== Naked ===
- Manson: The Lost Tapes (2018)
- Call in the Cheapstakes (2021)
- The Love Triangle (2021)

=== Fremantle Australia ===
- Top 20 Aussie Soap Moments (2011)
- Schapelle (2014)
- Neighbours 30th: The Stars Reunite (2015)
- Sleeping Beauty: Behind the Curtain (2015) (co-production with Stella Motion Pictures)
- Mary: The Making of a Princess (2015)
- Wentworth: Screen Fest (2020)
- Wentworth: Unlocked (2021)
- Boomer's Spinoff Behind the Scenes (2021)
