= Jake Allston =

American sound designer (born 1986)

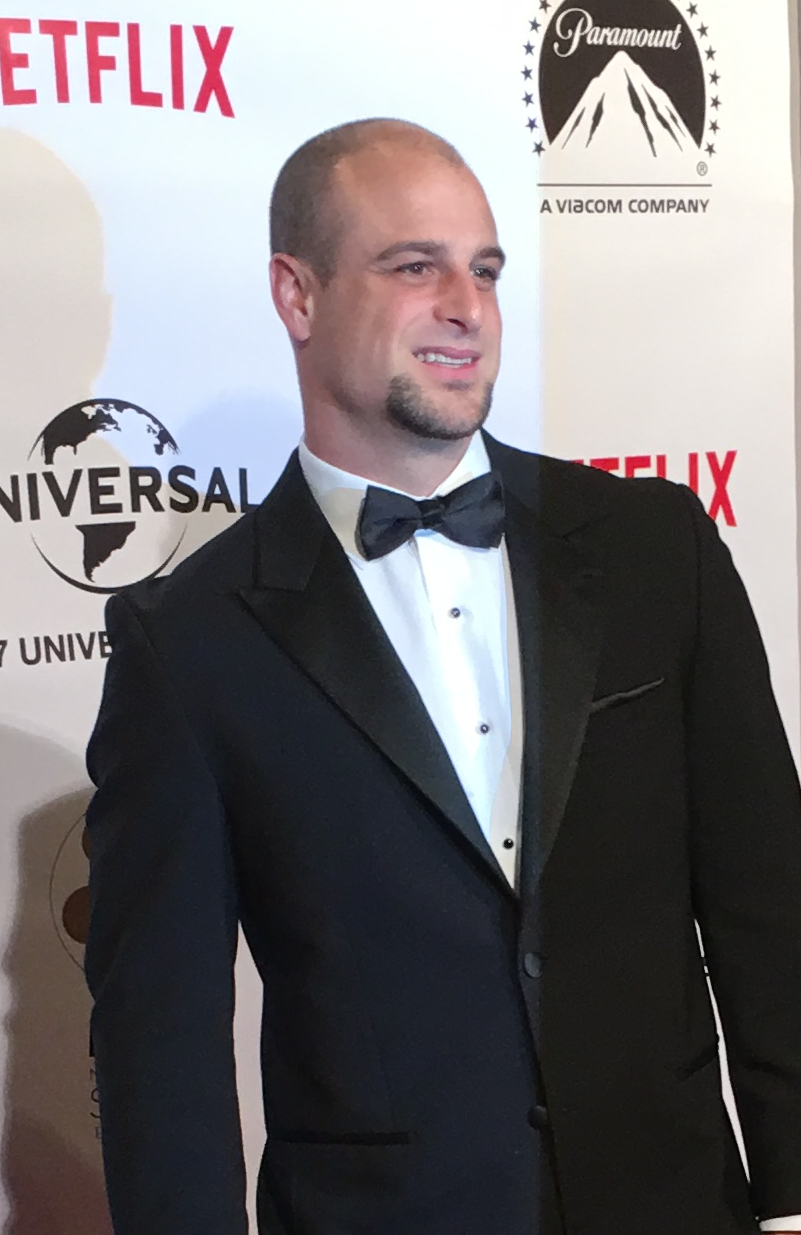
- Allston at MPSE Awards in 2018
- Born: 1986 (age 39–40)
- Occupation: Sound design
- Organization: NATAS
- Known for: TV, film, video games
- Notable work: Deadliest Catch, Ice Road Truckers, Tak and the Power of Juju, God of War, Spider-Man, Death Stranding
- Awards: Emmy, Golden Reel, BAFTA, D.I.C.E.
- Website: jakeallston.com

Jake Allston (born 1986) is an American sound designer.

== Career ==
Allston was born in Glens Falls, New York and started his professional career designing sound effects for animated television shows at Advantage Audio in 2006. Soon thereafter, he also edited audio for reality television at Max Post (Original Productions) in 2008 on various series including Deadliest Catch and Ice Road Truckers.

On August 30, 2009, Jake received an Emmy Award for his contributions as supervising sound editor on Nickelodeon's Tak and the Power of Juju. According to a representative of the National Academy of Television Arts and Sciences in New York, "Allston's achievement at such a young age is remarkable."

He began teaching Advanced Audio Post-Production at the Los Angeles Film School in 2015.

In 2017, Jake became senior cinematic sound designer for Sony PlayStation. His credits include God of War, Spider-Man, and Death Stranding. From 2018-2020, the accolades were substantial for the PS4 titles at various award ceremonies including the D.I.C.E. Awards, BAFTA Game Awards, NAVGTR Awards, and MPSE Awards.

== Filmography ==
Year	Title	Role
2006	Care Bears: Oopsy Does It!	Sound designer
2007	Random! Cartoons	Sound designer
2007	Tak and the Power of Juju	Supervising sound editor, sound designer
2007	My Friends Tigger & Pooh	Sound designer
2007	Sushi Pack	Sound designer
2008	Mixed Nutz	Supervising sound editor, sound designer
2008	Dragonlance: Dragons of Autumn Twilight	Sound designer
2008	I.O.U.S.A.	Sound effects, music, dialogue editor
2008	Raw Nature	Sound effects, music, dialogue editor
2008	Black Gold	Sound effects, music, dialogue editor
2008	L.A. Hard Hats	Sound effects, music, dialogue editor
2008	Iditarod	Sound effects, music, dialogue editor
2008	The Simpsons Ride	Additional sound design
2008	America's Toughest Jobs	Sound effects, music, dialogue editor
2009	3 Days Blind	Sound designer
2009	Timon and Pumbaa's Wild About Safety	Supervising sound editor, sound designer
2009	PitchMen	Sound effects, music, dialogue editor
2009	The Colony	Sound effects, music, dialogue editor
2009	Deadliest Catch	Sound effects, music, dialogue editor
2009	Ice Road Truckers	Sound effects, music, dialogue editor
2009	The Things We Carry	Sound designer
2009	The Mighty B!	Supervising sound editor, sound designer
2009	My Little Pony: Adventure	Sound designer
2010	Ax Men	Sound effects, music, dialogue editor
2010	1000 Ways to Die	Sound effects, music, dialogue editor
2010	Pixie Previews	Sound designer
2010	Care Bears: To the Rescue	Sound designer
2010	Care Bears: Share Bear Shines	Sound designer
2010	Care Bears: The Giving Festival	Sound designer
2010	Verminators	Sound effects, music, dialogue editor
2010	World of Color	Sound designer
2010	Angelina Ballerina: The Next Steps	Supervising sound editor, sound designer
2010	Tinpo	Sound designer
2010	Hydee and the Hytops	Sound designer
2011	G.I. Joe: Renegades	Supervising sound editor, sound designer
2011	Bob the Builder	Supervising sound editor, sound designer
2011	Fish Hooks	Sound designer
2011	Twinkle Toes	Sound designer
2011	YooHoo & Friends	Sound designer
2012	Teenage Mutant Ninja Turtles	Sound designer
2014	Intore	Sound effects, music, dialogue editor
2014	Euros of Hollywood	Sound effects, music, dialogue editor
2014	Something Borrowed, Something New	Sound effects, music, dialogue editor
2014	Guy's Grocery Games	Sound effects, music, dialogue editor
2014	White Collar Brawlers	Sound effects, music, dialogue editor
2014	Preaching Alabama	Sound effects, music, dialogue editor
2014	Dognition	Sound effects, music, dialogue editor
2014	The Last Frontiersman	Sound effects, music, dialogue editor
2015	Mississippi Men	Sound effects, music, dialogue editor
2015	Storage Wars	Sound effects, music, dialogue editor
2015	Alaska Off-Road Warriors	Sound effects, music, dialogue editor
2015	Da Jammies	Supervising sound editor, sound designer
2018	God of War	Senior cinematic sound designer, re-recording mixer, dialogue editor, music editor, character vocalizations
2018	Spider-Man	Senior cinematic sound designer, re-recording mixer, dialogue editor, music editor, character vocalizations
2019	Death Stranding	Senior cinematic sound designer, re-recording mixer, dialogue editor, music editor, character vocalizations, additional music

== Awards and nominations ==
=== Daytime Emmy Awards ===
2009 - Outstanding Achievement in Sound Editing – Live Action or Animation - Nickelodeon's Tak and the Power of Juju (won)

=== MPSE Golden Reel Awards ===
- 2020 - Motion Picture Sound Editors#Golden Reel Awards Outstanding Achievement in Sound Editing – Computer Cinematic - Death Stranding (nominated)
- 2020 - Outstanding Achievement in Sound Editing – Computer Interactive Game Play - Death Stranding (nominated)
- 2019 - Outstanding Achievement in Sound Editing – Computer Cinematic - God of War (nominated)
- 2019 - Outstanding Achievement in Sound Editing – Computer Interactive Game Play - God of War (won)
- 2019 - Outstanding Achievement in Sound Editing – Computer Cinematic - Spider-Man (nominated)
- 2019 - Outstanding Achievement in Sound Editing – Computer Interactive Game Play - Spider-Man (nominated)
- 2011 - Best Sound Editing: Television Animation - G.I. Joe: Renegades (Nominated)
- 2008 - Best Sound Editing: Television Animation - Tak and the Power of Juju (nominated)

=== BAFTA Games Awards ===
- 2020 - British Academy Games Awards Audio Achievement - Death Stranding (Nominated)
- 2019 - Audio Achievement - God of War (won)
- 2019 - Audio Achievement - Spider-Man (Nominated)

=== D.I.C.E. Awards ===
- 2020 D.I.C.E. Awards Outstanding Achievement in Sound Design - Death Stranding (won)
- 2019 - Outstanding Achievement in Sound Design - God of War (won)
- 2019 - Outstanding Achievement in Sound Design - Spider-Man (Nominated)

=== Golden Joystick Awards ===
- 2018 - Golden Joystick Awards Best Audio - God of War (won)

=== NAVGTR Awards ===
- 2020 - Sound Editing in a Game Cinema - Death Stranding (won)
- 2020 - Sound Effects - Death Stranding (nominated)
- 2020 - Use of Sound, Franchise - Death Stranding (nominated)
- 2019 - Sound Editing in a Game Cinema - God of War (won)
- 2019 - Sound Editing in a Game Cinema - Spider-Man (Nominated)
- 2019 - Sound Effects - God of War (won)
- 2019 - Sound Effects - Spider-Man (nominated)
- 2019 - Use of Sound, Franchise - God of War (won)

=== The Game Awards ===
- 2019 - The Game Awards Best Audio - Death Stranding (nominated)
- 2018 - Best Audio - God of War (nominated)
- 2018 - Best Audio - Spider-Man (nominated)
