= Storage Wars: Miami =

- Title card
- Genre: Reality
- Starring: Bob Nichols; Jerry Mahaffey; Kevin Pew; Jorge Gomez; Maydel Garcia; Greg Atz; Lindsey Atz; Yorgen Ugalde; Christian Fernandez
- Narrated by: Thom Beers
- Theme music composer: Andy Kubiszewski
- Opening theme: "Money Owns This Town"
- Country of origin: United States
- Original language: English
- No. of seasons: 1
- No. of episodes: 10 (list of episodes)

Production
- Executive producers: Robert Sharenow; Elaine Frontain Bryant; Thom Beers; Philip D. Segal
- Producer: Dolph Scott
- Running time: 22 minutes
- Production companies: Original Productions; FremantleMedia; A+E Networks

Original release
- Network: A&E
- Release: October 6 – November 24, 2015

Storage Wars: Miami (stylized as STORAGE WAR$: Miami) is an American reality television series on the A&E Network that premiered on October 6, 2015. When rent is not paid on a storage locker for three months in Florida, the contents can be sold by an auctioneer as a single lot of items in the form of a cash-only auction. The show follows professional buyers who purchase the contents based only on a five-minute inspection of what they can see from the door when it is opened. The goal is to turn a profit on the merchandise.

== Cast ==
- Jorge Gomez & wife Maydel Garcia, owner of Guaranteed Fence Corporation.
- Yorgen Ugalde & his cousin Christian Fernandez: In the past few years, their weekly garage sale has turned into two stores named 7 Days Garage Sale and The Buying House, a flea market, 24/7 online sales, and a warehouse for their furniture sales.

== Episodes ==
No.	Title	Location	Original release date
1	"Bienvenido a Miami!"	Hialeah and Miramar, FL	October 6, 2015
2	"Miami Wow Machine"	Pembroke Pines, FL	October 13, 2015
3	"Big Booty Foes"	Lantana, FL	October 13, 2015
4	"Don't Hate the Gator, Hate the Gate"	Hialeah, FL	October 20, 2015
5	"Deuces Wild"	Miramar, FL	October 20, 2015
6	"To Hell and Backpack"	Florida City, FL	October 27, 2015
7	"Interview With the Vampirologist"	Cooper City, FL	November 3, 2015
8	"O Brother, Where Art My Money?"	Hialeah, FL	November 10, 2015
9	"There's No Place Like Foam"	Miramar, FL	November 17, 2015
10	"Fit Lauderdale"	Ft. Lauderdale, FL	November 24, 2015

== Broadcast ==
Internationally, the series premiered in Australia on 9 November 2015 on A&E.
