= Life on the Line (disambiguation) =

Life on the Line is an album by Eddie and the Hot Rods.

Life on the Line may also refer to:

- Life on the Line (film), 2015 American disaster thriller film
- Life on the Line (TV series), a medical drama
- Swords: Life on the Line, a reality television series
- M.D.: Life on the Line, a Mexican telenovela
