= The Legend of Shelby the Swamp Man =

- Genre: Reality
- Starring: Shelby Stanga
- Opening theme: "Born on the Bayou"
- Country of origin: United States
- No. of seasons: 2
- No. of episodes: 10 + 2 specials

Production
- Executive producers: Thom Beers; Philip D. Segal; Jeff Conroy; Sarah Whalen
- Running time: 23 minutes
- Production company: Original Productions

Original release
- Network: History
- Release: August 6, 2013 – April 26, 2015

Related
- Ax Men

The Legend of Shelby the Swamp Man is an American reality television series that premiered on August 6, 2013, on History as a spin-off to the series Ax Men. The program follows the life of Shelby Stanga when he's not logging. The reality show is about the life and times of Shelby Stanga getting into strange situations as he goes about his unique life style.

A list of the episodes in season 1 includes:

1. "Air Shelby" (August 6, 2013)
2. "Gator Head Gamble" (August 6, 2013)
3. "Bad Juju" (August 13, 2013)
4. "Swamp Rat Race" (August 13, 2013)
5. "Reelin' in the Beers" (August 20, 2013)
6. "The Swamptastic Journey" (August 20, 2013)
7. "Swining & Dining" (August 27, 2013)
8. "Turtle Soup Tonight!" (August 27, 2013)

Also, a Christmas episode of the show aired on December 3, 2013 ("A Very Shelby Christmas") and an episode recapping Shelby's funniest moments on Ax Men on August 6, 2013 ("Shelby's Greatest Hits Vol. 1").

Two episodes aired on April 26, 2015 at 10:00 pm following the season finale of Ax Men.

== Reception ==
Common Sense Media rated the series as 3 stars out of 5.
