= Metal Flowers Media =

American casting company

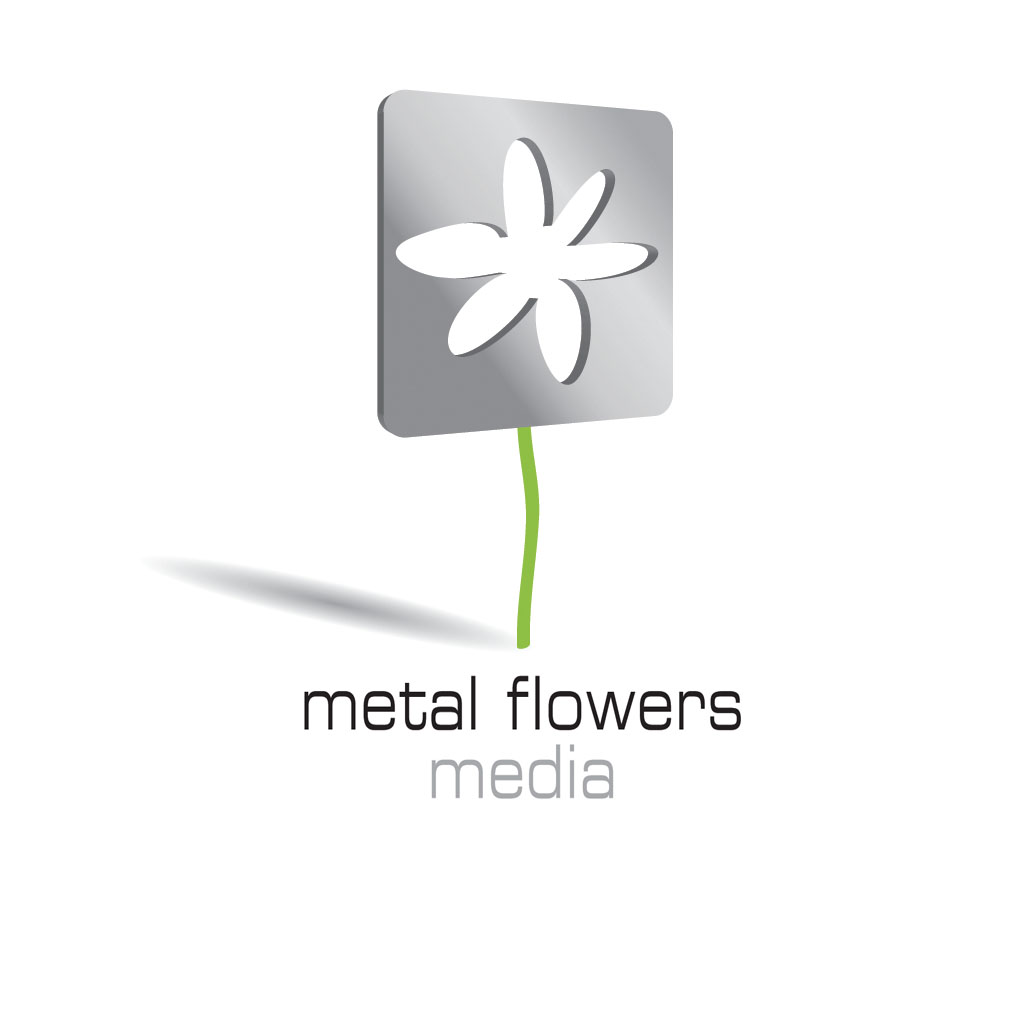
Logo

Metal Flowers Media, Inc is a casting company for unscripted programming and reality television based in Hollywood, California with a branch office in Boulder, Colorado.

== History ==
=== Early history ===
The company was founded by Kristi Russell in 2008 from the former Rocket Science Laboratories.

The company provides unscripted characters for television shows such as the Colony, Naked and Afraid, Bar Rescue, Catch A Contractor, Storage Wars, and Ultimate Survivor Alaska. Earlier hits include My Big Fat Greek Wedding, Trading Spouses, and America's Toughest Jobs.
