= Iditarod: Toughest Race on Earth =

2008 American TV series

- Narrated by: David Scott
- Country of origin: United States
- No. of seasons: 1
- No. of episodes: 6

Production
- Executive producer: Thom Beers
- Running time: 45 minutes
- Production company: Original Productions

Original release
- Network: Discovery Channel
- Release: October 14 – November 25, 2008

Iditarod: Toughest Race on Earth is a 2008 American reality television miniseries on the Discovery Channel that featured the 2008 Iditarod Trail Sled Dog Race from Anchorage to Nome, Alaska.

== Overview ==
The show follows and documents selected racers and their dogs during the 1,161 mi (1,868 km) trek through Alaska's wilderness. Iditarod entrants pay $3,000 to enter the race and must have completed certain qualifying races beforehand. Expenses for the race can exceed $20,000 and mushers often seek sponsors to aide in paying for the race. Most mushers hold outside jobs in addition to racing.

During the course of the show, it is shown how the logistics of running an Iditarod are handled. Supplies are gathered and then flown into each of the checkpoints usually just hours before the mushers arrive. Each musher is required to sign into each checkpoint and then decides if they are going to continue on or rest for several hours. Some mushers elect to take short stops, briefly feeding their dogs before continuing on the trail. Veterinarians perform constant examinations on the dogs at checkpoints throughout the race, and any injured or sick dogs are taken off of the team and then flown to Anchorage for proper care.

During the race, only three rest points are mandatory: one 24-hour and two 8-hour rests. Apart from that, mushers usually try to feed their dogs at each checkpoint, even if it is just as snack, as the dogs can burn around 10,000 calories a day.

== Episodes ==
| No. | Title | Original release date |
|---|---|---|
| 1 | "The Last Great Race" | October 14, 2008 |
The show begins at the ceremonial start of the 2008 Iditarod in Anchorage, Alaska, on March 1, 2008. 110 participants entered to compete in the 2008 race, with 95 mushers and their dog teams starting. It then follows them to the official starting point in Willow where the race begins the next day. By the end of the episode, Jeff King's team makes it to Finger Lake before his first extended stop. Most teams rest in Skwentna, though the large number of teams that have elected to stop creates a loud, restless atmosphere. By the end of the episode, three teams have dropped from the race and the first 48 hours of the race are covered.
| 2 | "Surviving the Alaska Range" | October 21, 2008 |
| 3 | "The King and the Pauper" | October 28, 2008 |
| 4 | "Chase on the Yukon" | November 11, 2008 |
| 5 | "The Great Escape" | November 18, 2008 |
| 6 | "Nome or Bust" | November 25, 2008 |

== Reception ==
Common Sense Media rated the show 4 out of 5 stars.
