= Mack Crowder =

American football player (born 1992)

No. 57
- Position: Center

Personal information
- Born: December 23, 1992 (age 33); Bristol, Tennessee, U.S.
- Listed height: 6 ft 3 in (1.91 m)
- Listed weight: 293 lb (133 kg)

Career information
- High school: Bristol (TN) Tennessee
- College: University of Tennessee (2011–2015)
- Stats at ESPN

Mack Crowder (born December 23, 1992) is an American former football center.

A native of Tennessee, Crowder attended Tennessee High School in Bristol, Tennessee. Regarded as a three-star recruit by Rivals.com, he was listed as the No. 14 center in his recruit class by Rivals and the No. 7 center in his class by ESPN.

== College career ==
Crowder redshirted his first year at Tennessee (2011), and then played backup to James Stone most of his redshirt freshman and sophomore seasons (2012-2013). He made his playing debut against Georgia State in the 2012 season, and also played against Kentucky that same season. During the spring practice of 2013, Crowder received the team's Harvey Robinson Award for the Most Surprising Offensive Player. In the 2013 season, Crowder drew his first career start at center against No. 11 South Carolina, where Tennessee's win snapped a 19-game losing streak against ranked opponents. Crowder also played in seven other games during the 2013 season. Crowder is slated to start the 2014 season and has been called by head coach Butch Jones a leader of the offensive line. Additionally, Crowder was selected as one of Tennessee's student-athlete representatives along with senior linebacker A.J. Johnson and junior defensive lineman Curt Maggitt for the 2014 SEC Media Day.

== Personal life ==
Mackenzie James Crowder was born in Bristol, Tennessee, on December 23, 1992, to Mike and Caroline Crowder. He has two older brothers: Michael, who played college football at Princeton University, and Matthew, who played college football at Cornell University.

On February 16, 2016, Crowder was arrested by Pinellas County, Florida, Sheriffs Deputies on four counts of sending material harmful to a minor and one count of using a computer for a prohibited purpose after engaging in a sexual online conversation with what the police said he believed was a minor. The four charges of sending material to a minor were subsequently dismissed by the state's attorney for Pinellas County. Crowder pleaded guilty to "unlawful use of a communication device" and was ordered to spend two months in jail. One of the prosecutors in Crowder's case stated that "Crowder initially went online looking for an adult companion, so this looked like a possible lapse in judgment."
