= Coal (TV series) =

- Genre: Reality
- Narrated by: Jeremy Sisto
- Theme music composer: Andy Kubiszewski
- Country of origin: United States
- Original language: English
- No. of seasons: 1
- No. of episodes: 10

Production
- Executive producers: Eric Lange; Jeff Conroy; Philip Segal; Thom Beers; Shawn George
- Running time: 42 minutes (excluding commercials)
- Production company: Original Productions

Original release
- Network: Spike
- Release: March 30 – June 19, 2011

Coal is an American reality television series that aired on Spike. The series debuted on March 30, 2011. The series portrayed the real life events on a coal mine in Westchester, West Virginia, and the inherent dangers involved.

The series was later premiered in the UK on November 8, 2011, via the Discovery Channel UK. It featured owner Mike Crowder along with several employees involved in the mining operation.

== Episodes ==
No.	Title	Original release date	US viewers (millions)
1	"The Master Mines"	March 30, 2011	1.234
2	"No Easy Way Out"	April 6, 2011	0.836
3	"Down 'N Out"	April 13, 2011	0.932
4	"Buried In Coal"	April 20, 2011	0.680
5	"Into The Heart Of Darkness"	May 8, 2011	N/A
6	"Out With The Coal, In With The New"	May 15, 2011	N/A
7	"A Mine Divided"	May 22, 2011	N/A
8	"Haunted By The Past"	June 5, 2011	N/A
9	"The Fight To Go Right"	June 12, 2011	N/A
10	"Brute Force and Bad Blood"	June 19, 2011	N/A
