= Nightingales (British TV series) =

British television series

- Written by: Paul Makin
- Directed by: Tony Dow
- Starring: Robert Lindsay; David Threlfall; James Ellis
- Country of origin: United Kingdom
- Original language: English
- No. of series: 2
- No. of episodes: 13

Production
- Executive producer: Laurence Marks (series 2)
- Producers: Esta Charkham (series 1); Rosie Bunting (series 2)
- Running time: 25 minutes
- Production company: Alomo Productions

Original release
- Network: Channel 4
- Release: 27 February 1990 – 10 February 1993

Nightingales is a British television sitcom, produced by Alomo Productions for Channel Four, and first shown between 27 February 1990 and 10 February 1993. The series was written by Paul Makin, and follows the surreal antics of three unorthodox security guards (Robert Lindsay, David Threlfall, and James Ellis) who work the night shift in an office block. The theme music is "A Nightingale Sang in Berkeley Square", by Eric Maschwitz and Manning Sherwin, whilst the closing theme is sung by Lindsay.

== Overview ==
Nightingales revolves around the jobs of three bored nightwatchmen working in a deserted office block, the location of which is never revealed in the show, although exterior shots are of Beneficial House located on Paradise Circus within Birmingham City Centre. A typical episode involved both very naturalistic dialogue, and the kind of claustrophobic studio-setting that prevailed in shows such as Steptoe and Son, combined with aspects of absurdism and surrealism. It combines black humour, theatrical allusions, claustrophobia, and self-awareness.

Laurence Marks, who co-founded Alomo Productions alongside Maurice Gran, stated that the series was their company's "very first, and probably finest, production".

Nightingales ran for two series totalling 13 episodes from 27 February 1990 to 10 February 1993. The delay was prompted by Channel 4 executive Seamus Cassidy who was not happy with the proposed scripts for the second series, which led to a nearly three-year delay before it was given the go-ahead. An American adaptation starring Trevor Eve was piloted, but it was never released. The show has been released on DVD.

== Reception ==
The series gained a cult following when it first screened in 1990. Nancy Banks-Smith described the series as having a "a limited but violently enthusiastic following".

The show has been remembered for its surreal humour, which is never explained as being genuine or the result of the character's sleep deprivation.

== Cast and characters ==
- Robert Lindsay as Carter, a pseudo-intellectual whose aspirations are invariably frustrated.
- David Threlfall as "Ding Dong" Bell, a moronic thug who is somewhat in awe of Carter.
- James Ellis as Sarge, an impossibly optimistic veteran watchman (who is occasionally used to parody the naive optimism of Dixon of Dock Green).
- Smith, a fourth character who sits with the trio, but is dead, allowing the other characters to collect his wages.

Guest characters include Piper (Edward Burnham), the elderly cleaning man; Eric The Werewolf (Ian Sears); an additional security guard who is a gorilla; and Mary the Christmas Allegory (Lia Williams), who gives birth to consumer products.

== Episodes ==
=== Series 1 ===
Broadcast Tuesday nights on C4 at 10:00pm.

No.	Title	Original airdate	Synopsis
1	"Moonlight Becomes You"	27 February 1990	The new lad gets a touch of lycanthropy. Problems with the inspector.
2	"Takeaway"	6 March 1990	Carter and Bell take the guise of Shakespearian villains to do away with Piper.
3	"Kiss and Make Up"	13 March 1990	Carter wins a date with a glamorous model.
4	"Opening Night"	20 March 1990	Sarge needs surgery. Swan may be a werewolf, but he's also a medical student.
5	"Scrutiny of the Bounty"	27 March 1990	They're under suspicion and under surveillance.
6	"Terence in the Midst"	3 April 1990	Security is so easy even a monkey can do it.

=== Series 2 ===
Broadcast Wednesday nights on C4 at 10:00pm.

No.	Title	Original airdate	Synopsis
1	"Silent Night"	30 December 1992	Christmas episode. A pregnant woman called Mary arrives on Christmas Eve. She assures them she's not an allegory.
2	"Trouble in Mind"	6 January 1993	A psychiatrist delves into the murky waters of Bell's mind after an incident with a horse.
3	"Crime and Punishment"	13 January 1993	A burglar, Jake Wood is apprehended, who produces incontrovertible evidence that he is the illegitimate son of one of the three men.
4	"All at Sea"	20 January 1993	Peter Vaughan guests as the new inspector who rules with an iron fist. Mutiny is in the air.
5	"Reach for the Sky"	27 January 1993	Carter and Bell compete for a job at Heathrow Airport by sitting a three-part exam.
6	"King Lear II"	3 February 1993	Eric the werewolf returns and a Shakespearean plot is brewed to sabotage the Sarge's prodigal "son".
7	"Someone to Watch Over Me"	10 February 1993	The employers install a new CCTV system and give them a cake. Three familiar-looking replacements arrive.
