= Mike Crowder =

American businessman and entrepreneur

- Born: Bristol, Tennessee
- Education: East Tennessee State University
- Children: 3

Mike Crowder (born June 21, 1962) is an American businessman and entrepreneur who focuses on the acquisition and development of metallurgical coal properties, and formerly a character on COAL, the documentary/reality television series produced by Original Productions for Spike TV.

== Early life ==
Michael Ray Crowder was born in Bristol, Tennessee, the second of four children to Oneida and Allen Crowder.

Mike was raised in Bristol, but in 1973 his family moved to New Smyrna Beach, Florida. He attended New Smyrna Beach High School, where he played football. After football practice and during the weekends, Mike would work for his father at a tire retread and retail store. Mike graduated high school in 1980, and went to Ottawa University in Ottawa, Kansas on a football scholarship. He later transferred to East Tennessee State University and graduated with a degree in computer science in 1986.

== Career ==
During his time at ETSU and shortly after, Mike worked as an EMT at the Bristol Life Saving Crew and a Sheriff's Deputy at the Sullivan County Sheriff's Department.

After his stint as a Sheriff's Deputy, Mike went on to build a successful computer consulting company with international clients. He began investing in real estate, and was either a full-time or part-time owner of five privately held companies.

While he was CEO of Cobalt Coal LTD., Mike was approached by Original Productions about doing a documentary/reality television series on Cobalt's coal mine located in McDowell County, West Virginia. Mike originally thought he was getting a prank call. Eventually, Mike decided to allow Original Productions access to the mine. The result was the television show COAL, whose first season aired on Spike TV on March 23, 2011.

== Personal life ==
Mike married Caroline Jeter on December 20, 1986. The couple has three sons: Michael (the eldest), Matthew, and Mack.
