= Original Productions =

TV production company

Original Productions, LLC
- Company type: Subsidiary
- Founded: 1999; 27 years ago
- Founder: Thom Beers
- Key people: Jeff Hasler (president)
- Products: Television series
- Parent: Fremantle North America (2009–present)
- Divisions: Amygdala Music
- Website: originalproductions.com

Original Productions, LLC is a television production company based in Burbank, California. It was founded in 1999 by Thom Beers.

== Background ==
It is best known for producing reality television shows for the Discovery Channel but has more recently produced shows for other networks such as History, truTV, and Spike.

Some of its most popular shows are Deadliest Catch, Ice Road Truckers, Ax Men, and 1000 Ways to Die. Its earlier hit was Monster Garage.

== History ==
Thom Beers founded Original Productions in 1999, when Discovery asked him to produce the two-hour special Extreme Alaska.

On February 19, 2009, FremantleMedia acquired 75% of Original Productions for $50 million.

On June 14, 2012, Beers launched a digital platform Original Productions Entertainment Networks that will feature his library. Philip D. Segal and Gayle Gilman were tapped to run the new venture. Later on August 29, 2012, Beers was promoted as CEO of FremantleMedia North America.

== Television series ==
- 1000 Ways to Die
- Alien Encounters
- Alaska Off-Road Warriors
- America's Port
- America's Toughest Jobs
- American Hoggers
- Are You Tougher Than a Boy Scout?
- Ax Men
- Backyard Nation
- Ballroom Bootcamp
- Beach PD
- Bering Sea Gold, aka Gold Divers
- Bering Sea Gold: Under The Ice
- Big!
- Biker Build-Off
- Black Gold
- Boom
- The Building
- Coal
- The Colony
- The Con Game
- Dead Tenants
- Deadliest Catch
- Deadliest Catch: Bloodline
- Deadliest Sea (TV movie)
- Disappeared
- Dog Brothers
- Fugitive Strike Force
- Holiday Madness
- Ice Road Truckers
- Iditarod: Toughest Race on Earth
- L.A. Hard Hats
- Lobstermen: Jeopardy at Sea
- Lobster Wars
- The Messengers
- Milk Carton Kids
- Monster Garage
- Monster House
- Monster Nation
- Motorcycle Women
- Ocean Force
- Plastic Surgery Before and After
- Raw Nature
- Resolutionaries
- Skyscraper Special
- Storage Wars
- Storage Wars: New York
- Storage Wars: Texas
- Swords
- Tattoo Wars
- Twister Sisters
- Verminators
- Whisker Wars
- Wing Nuts
