= America's Toughest Jobs =

- Created by: Thom Beers
- Starring: Josh Temple
- Country of origin: United States
- No. of seasons: 1
- No. of episodes: 10

Production
- Running time: 60 minutes

Original release
- Network: NBC
- Release: August 25 – October 25, 2008

America's Toughest Jobs is a reality television show that lasted one season and aired on NBC. It pitted contestants against each other as they attempted a series of difficult and dangerous jobs. The prize was the sum of the salaries that would be earned by people doing these jobs in their first year.

The show's creator and executive producer was Thom Beers, notable for creating shows such as Deadliest Catch and Monster Garage. Some of the jobs he chose to be featured on America's Toughest Jobs were featured on shows he previously created. The host was Josh Temple, a character actor who had minor roles in shows such as Will & Grace and Curb Your Enthusiasm.

In each episode, contestants took part in tasks associated with a job, and were supervised and evaluated by workers or employers in that business. After spending time on the job, the supervisors selected one or more top employees for praise, and selected the employees who had the worst performances (the bottom four in the first five episodes, and the bottom two thereafter). Those employees were required to compete head-to-head in an additional challenge to determine who would be eliminated. For example, in the gold digging episode, the bottom four contestants were required to spend additional time digging for gold with the contestant who found the least amount eliminated. Once there were four contestants remaining, timed challenges were held for three of the season's toughest jobs with the contestant who had the slowest time at each eliminated until a winner was determined. At the end of each episode, an information screen was shown that detailed what the eliminated contestant decided to do after the show.

Ben Coleman was named the winner of season one on October 25, 2008. The results were accidentally posted on NBC's website several hours before the show aired.

On March 13, 2009, it was confirmed that the series had been canceled and would not be returning for a second season.

== Season one ==
=== Contestant Progress ===
Week	1	2	3	4	5	6	7	8	9	Finale		
Contestant	Result											
Ben	Safe	Safe	Btm 2	Win	Safe	Win	Win	Safe	Safe	Win	Win	WIN
Steven	Btm 4	Safe	Btm 4	Safe	Btm 3	Btm 2 ^{3}	Safe	Safe	Safe	2nd	2nd	OUT
Sandy	Win^{1}	Safe	Win	Safe	Safe	Safe	Btm 2	Win	Btm 2	3rd	OUT	
Michaela	Win^{1}	Safe	Safe	Safe	Safe	Safe	Safe	Safe	Win	OUT		
Rommel	Safe	Btm 4	Safe	Safe	Win^{2}	Safe	Safe	Btm 2	OUT			
Bryce	Safe	Btm 3	Btm 3	Btm 4	Btm 4	Safe	Safe	OUT				
Chris	Safe	Btm 2	Safe	Btm 3	Btm 2	Safe	OUT					
Rie	Safe	Safe	Safe	Safe	Win^{2}	OUT						
Eric	Btm 2	Safe	Safe	Btm 2	OUT							
Rick	Safe	Safe	Safe	OUT								
Phil	Safe	Win	OUT									
Amy	Btm 3	OUT										
Senta	OUT											

- ^{1} In the first episode, the contestants were divided into two teams. A winner was selected from each team
- ^{2} In the fifth episode, there were two winners selected
- ^{3} In the sixth episode, it was announced that from then on there would only be two worst performers announced instead of four

The contestant won the competition
The contestant won the challenge
The contestant was called out as one of the worst performers, but was not eliminated
The contestant was eliminated

=== Episode list ===
- 101 "Crab Fishing"^{1} (first aired August 25, 2008) – The show began from Dutch Harbor, Alaska in the Bering Sea with the contestants tackling crab fishing.
- 102 "Trucking in Alaska"^{2} (first aired September 1, 2008) – The contestants learned how to navigate the icy and frozen roads as truck drivers in Alaska. The boss supervising the rookies said that he would be willing to hire the winner, Phil, full-time.
- 103 "Gold Digging" (first aired September 8, 2008) – The contestants searched for gold in the Chugach Mountains in southern Alaska.
- 104 "Monster Trucks" (first aired September 15, 2008) – The contestants took on monster trucking at a site in Salinas, California with Dennis Anderson and Grave Digger.
- 105 "Oil Drilling"^{3} (first aired September 19, 2008) – The contestants took on oil drilling in Odessa, Texas.
- 106 "Bullfighting" (first aired September 26, 2008) – The contestants learned professional bullfighting in San Angelo, Texas.
- 107 "Bridge Crew" (first aired October 3, 2008) – The contestants worked on the Vincent Thomas Bridge in San Pedro, California.
- 108 "Logging"^{4} (first aired October 10, 2008) – The contestants worked as loggers in Port Angeles, Washington.
- 109 "Mountain Rescue" (first aired October 18, 2008) – The contestants completed a mountain rescue on Mount McKinley in Alaska.
- 110 "Season Finale" (first aired October 25, 2008) – The final four contestants revisited the season's toughest jobs to determine the winner: bullfighting, oil drilling, and logging.

^{1} Job featured in Deadliest Catch, a show created by Thom Beers
^{2} Job featured in Ice Road Truckers, a show produced and narrated by Beers
^{3} Job featured in Black Gold, a show created and narrated by Beers
^{4} Job featured in Ax Men, a show created and narrated by Beers

=== Prize ===
The prize for the contest winner was the combined amount of the salaries of what a first-year worker would earn on each job. Below is a table that details the breakdown:

Job	Salary
Crab Fisherman	$29,805.98
Ice Road Trucker	$31,714.72
Gold Digger	$15,464.62
Monster Trucker	$45,614.58^{1}
Oil Driller	$35,184.22
Bullfighter	$41,785.81
Bridge Crewman	$47,592.15^{2}
Logger	$35,248.00
Mountain Guide	$15,589.92
Total	$298,000.00

- ^{1} $2,000 was subtracted from salary because contestants broke one of Dennis Anderson's jacks
- ^{2} The initial salary for bridge crewman was listed at $48,592.15, but was lowered to $47,592.15 in subsequent episodes with no explanation given

In addition, each of the contestants in the final four was awarded a 2009 Dodge Ram.

=== Epilogues ===
- 101 – Senta quit her previous job and moved to Alaska to work at Denali National Park.
- 102 – Amy quit her previous job and went back home to Boston to explore new opportunities.
- 103 – Phil accepted the previous offer of trucking in Alaska.
- 104 – Rick quit his previous job in the software industry and built his own gym for mixed martial arts.
- 105 – Eric invented a wildfire water protection system for the home.
- 106 – Rie landed another modeling contract.
- 107 – Chris quit his previous job and became a police officer in Pasadena, California.
- 108 – Bryce quit his previous job and opened a gym for celebrities and executives.
- 109 – Rommel continued to pursue his passion of teaching karate and opened a new martial arts school.
- 110 – Michaela began working with biologists in the Bahamas.
- 110 – Sandy went back to her job as a teacher with hopes of landing a job as a basketball coach.
- 110 – Steven began a career working in the film industry.
- 110 – Ben, the contest winner, started training to be a Monster Jam driver and used the prize money to buy a house.
