= Verminators =

- Genre: Documentary; Reality television
- Starring: Mike Masterson
- Narrated by: Thom Beers
- Opening theme: "Verminators Theme"
- Composer: Jonathan Miller
- Country of origin: United States
- Original language: English
- No. of seasons: 2
- No. of episodes: 26

Production
- Executive producers: Thom Beers; Philip Segal; Jeff Conroy; Joseph Boyle
- Running time: 40–46 minutes
- Production company: Original Productions

Original release
- Network: Discovery Channel
- Release: April 21, 2008 – October 15, 2009

Verminators is an American reality television series. It is produced by Original Productions of Burbank, California and broadcast in the United States on Discovery Channel, Canada on Discovery Channel (Canada) and the UK on Virgin1. The program follows the employees of the Los Angeles-based pest control company ISOTech as they rid homes and businesses of rodents, cockroaches, termites, spiders, birds and other pests. The series began its run throughout North America on Discovery Channel in April 2008.

A second season began airing in July 2009. It involves Masterson and the ISOTech crew, along with new recruits and associates, having traveled to Florida; ridding considered residents there of both typical and exotic pests that can be expected of a subtropical environment.

== Synopsis ==
Mike Masterson, along with his pest control team, ISOTech, take on various challenges involving ridding their clients' homes, apartments, or businesses of recognized pests.

== Episodes ==
=== Season 1 ===
#	Title	Air Date
01	"Night at the Races"	April 21, 2008
02	"Rookie Mistakes"	April 28, 2008
03	"The Hills Have Rats"	May 5, 2008
04	"Moby Rat"	May 12, 2008
05	"Infestation Nation"	May 19, 2008
06	"Return of the Rat"	June 2, 2008
07	"Hollywood Roaches"	June 9, 2008
08	"Horror Attic"	June 16, 2008
09	"Roach Motel"	June 30, 2008
10	"Roach Motherload"	July 7, 2008
11	"No Kill Solution"	July 14, 2008
12	"Plague of Vermin"	July 21, 2008
13	"Day of the Rat"	August 4, 2008

=== Season 2 ===
#	Title	Air Date
01	"Trial By Rat"	July 15, 2009
02	"Roman Goes Vegan"	July 22, 2009
03	"Gator Bait"	July 29, 2009
04	"Rats! Bats! Crap!"	August 12, 2009
05	"Bedbugs Bite!"	August 19, 2009
06	"Wild West Skunks"	August 20, 2009
07	"Deadly Desert"	August 27, 2009
08	"Polly Wants Revenge"	September 4, 2009
09	"Lights! Camera! Vermin!"	September 13, 2009
10	"Emergency! Closure!"	September 16, 2009
11	"Holy Bees!"	September 23, 2009
12	"Mr. Whiskers Was a Rat"	September 30, 2009
13	"They're Not Your Friends"	October 15, 2009

== Home media ==
The complete first season was released on DVD by Topics Entertainment on August 10, 2010, in the United States and Canada. The 4-disc region 1 set titled, Verminators: Extreme Extermination, contained all 13 aired episodes. The season also became available in the United States on Amazon Video.

The second season, however, never received a DVD release. It is only available via digital download through Amazon Video in the United States and iTunes in Canada.

== Soundtrack ==
All songs written and composed by Jonathan Miller.

#	Title	Length
1.	"Verminators Theme"	0:40
2.	"Searching Again"	2:06
3.	"Japanese Thriller"	1:43
4.	"Toy Piano Purgatory"	1:47
5.	"Industrial Phatness"	2:06
6.	"Sneaking Around"	1:43
7.	"Industrial Strength"	2:10
8.	"Magnified Insects"	1:26
9.	"Searching Groove"	1:44
10.	"Hard Synth Beat"	2:23
11.	"New Rock Direction"	1:25
12.	"Big Percussion Chase"	1:46
13.	"Mysterious Rock Groove"	1:43
14.	"Insectritual"	1:36
15.	"Speculation"	2:12
16.	"Creepy Bugs"	1:45
17.	"Comedy Horror"	1:26
18.	"Preparing for Battle"	1:34
19.	"Creepy Montage"	1:46
20.	"Roaches Roast"	3:03
21.	"Sex, Bugs, and Rock and Roll"	1:25
22.	"Eerie Delight"	1:44
23.	"Evil Bugs"	1:19
24.	"Night in the Jungle"	1:16
25.	"Blue Collar Bugs Rock"	2:43

== See also ==
- Dirty Jobs
- Billy the Exterminator
