= Ballroom Bootcamp =

- Genre: Reality television
- Starring: Gocha Chertkoev
- Country of origin: United States
- Original language: English
- No. of seasons: 2
- No. of episodes: 14

Production
- Executive producer: Thom Beers
- Running time: 24 minutes
- Production company: Original Productions

Original release
- Network: TLC
- Release: October 7, 2005 – January 26, 2007

Ballroom Bootcamp is an American reality television series that debuted on the TLC cable network, on October 7, 2005. The series follows several individuals who try to improve their skill of dance. The series ended on January 26, 2007, after two seasons.

== Episodes ==
Season	Episodes	Originally released	
Season	Episodes	First released	Last released
1	10	October 7, 2005	December 16, 2005
2	4	January 5, 2007	January 26, 2007

=== Season 1 (2005) ===
No. overall	No. in season	Title	Original release date
1	1	"The Tomboy, the Tour Guide and the Tired Mom"	October 7, 2005
2	2	"The Free Spirit, the Shy Girl and the Hippie Mom"	October 14, 2005
3	3	"The Artist, the Old Dog and the Football Player"	October 21, 2005
4	4	"The Wild Child, the Housewife and the Criminalist"	October 28, 2005
5	5	"The Party Girl, the Rocker and the Country Kid"	November 4, 2005
6	6	"The Producer, the Athlete and the Single Mom"	November 11, 2005
7	7	"The Comic, the Entrepreneur and the Drama Queen"	November 18, 2005
8	8	"The New Mom, the Architect and the Bookworm"	December 2, 2005
9	9	"The Busyboy, the Lonely Girl and the Den Mother"	December 9, 2005
10	10	"The Bodybuilder, the Nerd and the Tough Guy"	December 16, 2005

=== Season 2 (2007) ===
No. overall	No. in season	Title	Original release date
11	1	"Episode 1"	January 5, 2007
12	2	"Episode 2"	January 12, 2007
13	3	"Episode 3"	January 19, 2007
14	4	"Episode 4"	January 26, 2007
