= Deadliest Catch: Bloodline =

American documentary and reality television series

- Genre: Documentary; Reality television
- Starring: Josh Harris; Casey McManus; Jeff Silva
- Composer: Didier Rachou
- Country of origin: United States
- Original language: English
- No. of seasons: 3
- No. of episodes: 28 (list of episodes)

Production
- Executive producers: Jeff Hasler; Brian Lovett; Ernie Avila; Arom Starr-Paul; Peta Peterson
- Cinematography: Nathan Garofalos; Ryan McPherson; Ben Zupo
- Running time: 60 minutes
- Production company: Original Productions

Original release
- Network: Discovery Channel
- Release: April 14, 2020 – June 21, 2022

Deadliest Catch: Bloodline (sometimes shortened to Bloodline) is an American documentary and reality television series that premiered on April 14, 2020, on the Discovery Channel. Bloodline is a spin-off of Discovery Channel's Deadliest Catch. In contrast to the program's usual setting in the Bering Sea during crab fishing season, Bloodline is set in Hawaii. The show's three-seasons follow fishermen Josh Harris, his business partner Casey McManus (both captains of the F/V Cornelia Marie on the Deadliest Catch series), and Jeff Silva as they investigate scribbles and notes found on Hawaiian fishing charts left by Josh's late father, Phil Harris. Bloodline was launched the same day as the season 16 premiere episode of Deadliest Catch. Discovery cancelled the series and removed all episodes from its Discovery+ streaming service in September 2022 after renewed attention was brought to a 1999 sexual assault case involving Josh Harris.

== Premise ==
As the boat F/V Cornelia Marie was being remodeled, Josh Harris found Hawaiian fishing charts that his late father, Captain Phil Harris, left behind. Josh and his business partner, Casey McManus, venture to the Hawaiian Kona Coast in search of ahi tuna and to learn about Phil's time spent there in the 1980s. While in Hawaii, Josh and Casey team up with a local commercial fisherman Jeff Silva for help in better understanding the coastal fishery, translating Phil's charts and notes, and guiding them on their new endeavor—catching tuna, each worth about $2,000. The hunt will also include barracuda, swordfish, and other underwater species. Johnathan Hillstrand, co-captain of Deadliest Catch's F/V Time Bandit, appears on the show and meets with Josh, Casey, and Jeff to help answer questions about Phil's possible motives on fishing in Hawaiian waters.

== Cast ==
Main

- Josh Harris – Co-captain of the F/V Cornelia Marie, a Bering Sea crab fishing vessel featured in Deadliest Catch
- Casey McManus – Co-captain of the F/V Cornelia Marie featured in Deadliest Catch
- Jeff Silva – Local veteran fisherman

Recurring

- Johnathan Hillstrand – Captain of the F/V Time Bandit featured in Deadliest Catch

Other appearances

- Sig Hansen – Captain of the F/V Northwestern featured in Deadliest Catch
- Jim McManus – Casey's father
- Larry Silva – Jeff's father
- John Kauhaihau – Veteran fisherman
- Chuck Leslie – Veteran fisherman
- Kolina Silva – Jeff's wife

== Series overview ==
Season	Episodes	Originally released		
Season	Episodes	First released	Last released	Network
1	6	April 14, 2020	May 19, 2020	Discovery
2	10	April 20, 2021	June 22, 2021	Discovery+, Discovery
3	10	April 19, 2022	June 21, 2022	Discovery

== Episodes ==
=== Season 1 (2020) ===
No. overall	No. in season	Title	Original release date	U.S. viewers (millions)
1	1	"The Harris Legacy"	April 14, 2020	1.41
After discovering fishing charts on the F/V Cornelia Marie, co-captains Josh Harris and Casey McManus go to Hawaii to find out what Josh's late father, Phil Harris, was trying to accomplish in the 1980s.
2	2	"Proving Grounds"	April 21, 2020	1.32
Josh, Casey, and Jeff travel to the southwestern district, the Kona Coast, fishing grounds where Phil Harris frequently explored. Despite complications, they dive into shark-infested waters to try to discover why Phil kept coming back.
3	3	"Ohana"	April 28, 2020	1.45
Josh and his crew get a chance to fish tuna for a local restaurant in hopes of a profitable day while using Phil's notes. But first, they must learn the Hawaiian way.
4	4	"Cowboys and Pirates"	May 5, 2020	1.31
On the Island of Hawaii, Josh and the crew meet with Johnathan Hillstrand in hopes of him helping answer questions and unlocking the mystery of Phil's charts and of Phil's time spent in Kona Town.
5	5	"All-Nighter"	May 12, 2020	1.39
Josh, Casey, and Johnathan Hillstrand attempt night-time fishing to learn ancient Hawaiian fishing techniques.
6	6	"The Legacy Continues"	May 19, 2020	1.20
With only two days left in Hawaii before returning to Dutch Harbor, Josh and Casey try to fulfill their last goal of catching a marlin.

=== Season 2 (2021) ===
All episodes were only available on Discovery+, except the season premiere, which was also aired on Discovery Channel.

No. overall	No. in season	Title	Original release date	U.S. viewers (millions)
7	1	"Brother's Keeper"	April 20, 2021	0.87
Josh, Casey, Jeff, and Johnathan recap the previous season and preview the upcoming season. This episode was aired on Discovery in addition to being available on Discovery+.
8	2	"Hillstrand's Heroes"	April 27, 2021	N/A
Captain Josh gets a surprise visit from Johnathan Hillstrand. Challenges due to Covid-19 and a demanding client force the boys to get creative.
9	3	"Over the Mountain"	May 4, 2021	N/A
A large order from a new client in Vegas sends Captain Josh Harris and partners Casey and Jeff to the violent and Tuna rich waters off legendary Hilo Bay.
10	4	"Fisherman's Friend"	May 11, 2021	N/A
Hurricane Douglas forces Josh, Casey and Jeff to go to increasingly dangerous lengths in Kona's shark and marlin infested southern waters to fulfil an order.
11	5	"Like Father Like Son"	May 18, 2021	N/A
Captain Josh only has two days left to fulfil the big Las Vegas order. Johnathan suggests recruiting some experienced fishermen to get the job done.
12	6	"Dangerous Crossing"	May 25, 2021	N/A
Josh sends Casey and Jeff on a difficult channel crossing
13	7	"A Bigger Boat"	June 1, 2021	N/A
An old friend of Phil's inspires Josh to bring the Conelia Marie to Hawaii
14	8	"Cornelia Marie in Hawaii"	June 8, 2021	N/A
Josh gambles on bringing the F/V Cornelia Marie to Hawaii
15	9	"Uncharted Waters"	June 15, 2021	N/A
16	10	"This is My Family"	June 22, 2021	N/A

=== Season 3 (2022) ===
No. overall	No. in season	Title	Original release date	U.S. viewers (millions)
17	1	"The Other Brother"	April 19, 2022	0.76
18	2	"Treacherous Grounds"	April 26, 2022	0.84
19	3	"Leaving Las Vegas"	May 3, 2022	0.79
20	4	"Father Knows Best"	May 10, 2022	0.75
21	5	"Deep South"	May 17, 2022	0.70
22	6	"Swamp Captains"	May 24, 2022	0.76
23	7	"A Crack in the Mystery"	May 31, 2022	0.81
24	8	"Divide and Conguer"	June 7, 2022	0.81
25	9	"Category 4"	June 14, 2022	N/A
26	10	"Cataclysm in Kona"	June 21, 2022	N/A

== Specials ==
=== Deadliest Catch: Bloodline pre-premiere releases ===
The pre-premiere (PP) releases' air times range from five to nine minutes each. The "teasers" are not considered to be pilots or the first episodes of the season.

No. in series	Title	Original release date
PP1	"Bloodline: Part 1"	March 17, 2020
After fishing charts are discovered, Josh Harris meets with Sig Hansen in hopes of learning about Josh's late father's, Phil Harris, time spent in Hawaii decades ago.
PP2	"Bloodline: Part 2"	March 18, 2020
Josh Harris and Casey McManus meet with Johnathan Hillstrand to see if they should make a journey to Hawaii and learn more about his father's charts.
PP3	"Bloodline: Part 3"	March 18, 2020
Josh Harris and Casey McManus visit Casey's father and ask questions about whether they should start a fishing business in Hawaii. Josh vows to finish what his father had started.
PP4	"Bloodline: Part 4"	March 18, 2020
Josh Harris and Casey McManus arrive in Hawaii, pick up a boat, and attend a fish auction. The co-captains begin their endeavors on the Kona Coast.
PP5	"Bloodline: Part 5"	March 18, 2020
Josh Harris and Casey McManus embark on their first attempt at fishing in the Kona Coast waters of Hawaii. As they reach an area on one of the charts, things don't go according to plan.

=== Deadliest Catch: Bloodline ===
No. overall	Featured season	Title	Original release date	US viewers (millions)
1	3	"Unexpected Legacy"	April 12, 2022	0.70
1	3	"Jeff Silva Fishmaster"	June 28, 2022	N/A

== See also ==
- Deadliest Catch vessels
