= Are You Tougher Than a Boy Scout? =

- Genre: Reality
- Country of origin: United States
- Original language: English
- No. of seasons: 1
- No. of episodes: 6

Production
- Executive producers: Jeff Conroy; Philip D. Segal; Richard Wells; Thom Beers
- Running time: 42 to 44 minutes
- Production company: Original Productions

Original release
- Network: National Geographic Channel
- Release: March 4 – April 1, 2013

Are You Tougher Than a Boy Scout? is an American reality television series on the National Geographic Channel that debuted on March 4, 2013. It features Scouting-themed competitions between adults and members of the Boy Scouts of America. The show is hosted by Charles Ingram, a former Army Ranger.

The producers of the show had to find a location to host the show for activities such as Whitewater rafting, rappelling, wilderness navigation and canoe jousting (admittedly a new addition to the Boy Scout skill set). Camp Whitsett, which rests in the heights of the Sequoia National Monument near Lake Ida and the mighty Kern River, was chosen for its traditional Mountain Camp ambiance as well as the rugged terrain that could challenge even the most practiced outdoorsman.

== Cast ==
- Will "Big South" Fleming
- Rio "Wolf" Gifford
- Rob "Robin Hood" Nelsen
- Bobby "Lash" Lefevre
- Kevin "Bug Bite" Graves
- Garret "Shark Fin" Rios
- Keegan "Yeti" Rice
- Michael "Hitch" Henderson
- Brenan "Hawk" Corbin
- Trent "Benz" Buenzli
- Diallo "Torpedo" Whitaker
- Denicio "Toro" Drake-Gonzales

== Episodes ==
| No. | Title | Original release date |
|---|---|---|
| 1 | "Canoe Jousting" | March 4, 2013 |
| 2 | "Ninja Scouts" | March 11, 2013 |
| 3 | "Where Eagles Fly" | March 18, 2013 |
| 4 | "Buoy Scouts" | March 25, 2013 |
| 5 | "Face Plant" | April 1, 2013 |
| 6 | "Man vs. Scout" | April 1, 2013 |

== Controversy ==
The show generated a significant backlash against the network for their association with the Boy Scouts of America, an organization that, prior to 2014, banned openly gay scouts. An online petition urging National Geographic to issue a disclaimer before the show was rejected by National Geographic, responding that "It is against our network’s policy to air any disclaimer other than those warning that 'Viewer Discretion is Advised' due to content".

It was reported that the series is part of a "strategic partnership" with the National Geographic Channel, to describe the series as a tool to push the idea that "Scouting is 'cool' with youth". It goes on to state that the Boy Scouts of America will continue to work on marketing plans with National Geographic for "leveraging the show with Scouting audiences and audiences outside of scouting".
