= American Hoggers =

- Robert Campbell, Jerry Campbell, Krystal Campbell and Lea Penick (from left)
- Genre: Reality
- Starring: Jerry Campbell
- Theme music composer: Andy Kubiszewski
- Opening theme: "Catch Me If You Can"
- Country of origin: United States
- Original language: English
- No. of seasons: 4
- No. of episodes: 41

Production
- Executive producers: David McKillop; Elaine Frontain Bryant; Jeff Conroy; Lily Neumeyer; Philip D. Segal; Thom Beers
- Producer: Brent Henderson
- Camera setup: Multiple
- Running time: 22 to 24 minutes
- Production company: Original Productions

Original release
- Network: A&E
- Release: October 19, 2011 – November 19, 2013

American Hoggers is an American reality television series on A&E that debuted October 19, 2011. The series chronicles the lives of the Campbell family whose family business is professional game hunting and animal control specifically the removal of feral hogs in the state of Texas. Season 4 premiered on October 22, 2013.

== Synopsis ==
The show chronicles the day in the life of Coryell County (about 100 miles north west of Austin) Texan Jerry Campbell and his family, as they struggle to control the explosive population growth of feral hogs in the state of Texas. Feral hogs are a growing problem because of their destructive feeding habits, potential to spread disease and increasing population. They can be dangerous and are able to cause serious harm and injury to humans and livestock.

Millions of dollars are lost by farmers and ranchers from the devastating chaos caused by these wild boars which has prompted the state of Texas to allow and sanction the practice of elimination without limits of the wild pigs. The goal is not eradication, which few believe possible, but control. As age and dwindling mobility continue to hit Jerry Campbell, Jerry attempts to slowly transition his children to taking over his role of company head.

== Cast ==
- Jerry Dean Campbell – the patriarch of the Campbell family; has been hog hunting for over forty years; perfected his trade with the Department of Interior as a federal hunter, responsible for eliminating problem animals that were killing livestock; believes the old ways are the right ways; hopes to be the next wild hog sausage mogul
- Robert "Hunter" Campbell – the elder son; has spent years refining his hog hunting skills in effort to advance the company's profile; overzealous, hardheaded, and quick to quarrel with anyone differing in his view point
- Krystal "Pistol" Campbell – the youngest member of the Campbells; not a typical cowgirl; armed with her six-shooter, her hot pink chaps, and pink nails, this cowgirl isn't afraid to get dirty when it comes to proving herself; aspires to also take over the family business. Left with Penick to form Wild Women Hoggers, a rival hog hunting outlet after a fallout with Jerry Campbell.
- Lea Penick – family friend and "honorary member of the Campbell clan" as dubbed by Jerry; married rancher and seasoned hunter; competitive barrel racer, her horsemanship, assertiveness, and calmness is an asset to the Campbells' hog hunting business
- Kathie Campbell – the matriarch of the Campbell family; keeps every member of the family in check; acts as the bridge for the generational gap between Jerry and their kids
- The Dogs – the Walker hound, both purebred and mixed, are the typical dogs used by Jerry Campbell; they are a derivative of the American Foxhound; the lead dog (Rooster, who died in season 1, and Ranger) chaperone the pack (Creager, Doce, Griz, Jill, Lugnut, and Sparkplug), and the striker dog (Big'un, who is responsible for subduing the hog by attacking its ear) in search of the destructive hogs.
- Creek Boys – the rival hoggers to the Campbells led by West Virginia native Ronnie Creek as Hog Boss and co-owner of Tater Creek Outfitters. The Creek team consists of Texans Randy Tate (co owner of Tater Creek Outfitters), Dave "Shep" Shepperd and exterminator Cody Whitish.
- Katie Ball – a former bartender and fitness model from Central Texas, hired by Jerry in order to pick up the void left in his company when Krystal and Lea resigned. Jerry hopes to mentor her into becoming a hog hunter.

== Episodes ==
=== Pilot episode (2011) ===
No.	Title	Original release date	U.S. viewers (millions)
–	"Meet the Campbells"	October 19, 2011	2.10

=== Season 1 (2011) ===
No. overall	No. in season	Title	Original release date	U.S. viewers (millions)
1	1	"Junkyard Hog"	October 19, 2011	1.80
2	2	"Life on the Line"	October 26, 2011	1.83
3	3	"Man Down"	October 26, 2011	1.63
4	4	"Cage Match"	November 2, 2011	1.94
5	5	"Calf Killer"	November 2, 2011	2.08
6	6	"Sour Grapes"	November 9, 2011	1.39
7	7	"Boar Wars"	November 9, 2011	1.44
8	8	"Apocalypse Hog"	November 16, 2011	1.98

=== Season 2 (2012) ===
No. overall	No. in season	Title	Original release date	U.S. viewers (millions)
9	1	"Over the Hill"	August 15, 2012	2.53
10	2	"When Push Comes to Shove"	August 15, 2012	2.50
11	3	"I Hate a Calf Killer"	August 22, 2012	1.77
12	4	"If You Want Something Done Right"	August 22, 2012	1.81
13	5	"Best Laid Plans"	August 29, 2012	2.03
14	6	"Dead in the Bayou"	August 29, 2012	2.00
15	7	"Family Matters"	September 5, 2012	1.34
16	8	"Nemesis"	September 12, 2012	2.20
17	9	"Up the Creek"	September 12, 2012	1.59
18	10	"New Recruit"	September 19, 2012	1.86
19	11	"Ranger Come Home"	September 19, 2012	2.03
20	12	"The End is Near"	October 3, 2012	1.25
21	13	"Pistol Whipped"	October 3, 2012	1.47

=== Season 3 (2013) ===
No. overall	No. in season	Title	Original release date	U.S. viewers (millions)
22	1	"Before the Storm"	April 16, 2013	1.44
23	2	"Breaking Point"	April 16, 2013	1.44
24	3	"Separate Ways"	April 23, 2013	1.53
25	4	"To Catch a Pig"	April 23, 2013	1.59
26	5	"Turf War"	April 30, 2013	1.43
27	6	"Hog-Blocking"	April 30, 2013	1.49
28	7	"Stuck in the Mud"	May 7, 2013	1.50
29	8	"Heartache"	May 14, 2013	1.65
30	9	"Turning Point"	May 28, 2013	1.60
31	10	"Swamped"	May 28, 2013	1.36

=== Season 4 (2013) ===
No. overall	No. in season	Title	Original release date	U.S. viewers (millions)
32	1	"The Replacement"	October 22, 2013	1.16
33	2	"Divide and Conquer"	October 22, 2013	1.18
34	3	"Makin' Tracks"	October 29, 2013	1.23
35	4	"Real Texas Hero"	October 29, 2013	1.15
36	5	"Hogwash"	November 5, 2013	1.02
37	6	"Two Steps Forward..."	November 5, 2013	1.02
38	7	"Campbell vs. Campbell"	November 12, 2013	1.06
39	8	"Blazed and Confused"	November 12, 2013	1.07
40	9	"Sweet Revenge"	November 19, 2013	TBA
41	10	"And the Winner Is"	November 19, 2013	TBA
