= Swords (TV series) =

- Promotional Title Card
- Also known as: Swords: Life on the Line
- Country of origin: United States
- No. of seasons: 3
- No. of episodes: 28

Production
- Running time: 40–45 minutes
- Production company: Original Productions

Original release
- Network: Discovery Channel
- Release: August 11, 2009 – July 7, 2011

Swords: Life on the Line is a reality television series produced by Original Productions for the Discovery Channel. The series documents the events aboard New England fishing boats fishing for Swordfish. See Longline fishing.

The series follows a similar format to Deadliest Catch. In the first season, television crews are placed on four boats to tape their fishing season: The Eagle Eye II, Big Eye, Sea Hawk, and Frances Anne. In Season 2, the Sea Hawk was replaced by the Bjorn II by the boat's captain. In the third season, the Bjorn II was replaced by Linda Greenlaw's first boat the Hannah Boden.

== Episodes ==
=== Season 1 (2009) ===
No. overall	No. in season	Title	Original release date
1	1	"Voyage to Hell"	August 11, 2009
2	2	"Blood on the Deck"	August 18, 2009
3	3	"Hostile TakeOver"	August 25, 2009
4	4	"Man Overboard"	September 1, 2009
5	5	"Home Sick"	September 8, 2009
6	6	"Making Waves"	September 15, 2009
7	7	"A Perfect Storm"	September 22, 2009
8	8	"Pay out"	September 29, 2009

==== Featured boats ====
- F/V Eagle Eye II - Scotty Drabinowicz
- F/V Big Eye - Chris "Chompers" Hanson
- F/V Sea Hawk - Linda Greenlaw
- F/V Frances Anne - Chris "Slick" Kleme
- F/V Destiny - Billy Kingett: F/V Desinty was seen giving charts to the Big Eye
- F/V Eagle Eye: F/V Eagle Eye dropped off crewmen for the Eagle Eye II

=== Season 2 (2010) ===
No. overall	No. in season	Title	Original release date
9	1	"Grand Banks or Bust"	August 10, 2010
10	2	"Deckhands Down"	August 24, 2010
11	3	"Turf War"	August 24, 2010
12	4	"Overloaded and into the Storm"	August 31, 2010
13	5	"So Close But So Far"	September 7, 2010
14	6	"Man Overboard!"	September 14, 2010
15	7	"Needle and Thread to the Head"	September 21, 2010
16	8	"Trapped"	September 28, 2010
17	9	"What Happened on the Back Deck?"	October 5, 2010
18	10	"What It Takes to Be a Fisherman"	October 12, 2010

==== Featured boats ====
- F/V Eagle Eye II - Scotty Drabinowicz
- F/V Big Eye - Chris "Chompers" Hanson
- F/V Bjorn II - Linda Greenlaw
- F/V Frances Anne - Chris "Slick" Kleme and Rick Mears (Mears replaced Kleme partway through the season)

=== Season 3 (2011) ===
No. overall	No. in season	Title	Original release date
19	1	"Gamblers and Legends"	May 13, 2011
20	2	"Long Lines and Short Tempers"	March 17, 2011
21	3	"The Storm of the Century"	May 26, 2011
22	4	"With Friends Like These"	June 2, 2011
23	5	"Charlie Foxtrot"	June 2, 2011
24	6	"Foreign Relations"	June 9, 2011
25	7	"Bested, Battered & Broke"	June 16, 2011
26	8	"Dead in the Water"	June 23, 2011
27	9	"Lost Hopes and Last Chances"	June 30, 2011
28	10	"The Final Gamble"	July 7, 2011

==== Featured boats ====
- F/V Eagle Eye II - Scotty Drabinowicz
- F/V Big Eye - Chris "Chompers" Hanson
- F/V Hannah Boden - Linda Greenlaw
- F/V Frances Anne - Chris "Slick" Kleme
- F/V Alex Marie:The Alex Marie was seen giving mechanical parts to the Hannah Boden, tied up during Hurricane Igor behind the Big Eye, and eventually being towed in by the Big Eye when the Alex Marie became disabled

== See also ==
- Deadliest Catch
- Lobster Wars
- Wicked Tuna
