= The Colony (American TV series) =

American reality TV series

- Also known as: The Colonization
- Genre: Reality
- Narrated by: Thom Beers
- Composers: Andy Kubiszewski; Amygdala Music Library
- Country of origin: United States
- Original language: English
- No. of seasons: 2
- No. of episodes: 20

Production
- Executive producers: Thom Beers; Philip David Segal
- Production locations: 516 S Anderson St, Los Angeles, California, United States
- Editor: Kevin Nibley
- Camera setup: Multiple
- Running time: 44 minutes

Original release
- Network: Discovery Channel
- Release: July 21, 2009 – September 28, 2010

The Colony is a reality television series that is produced by the Discovery Channel. The program follows a group of people who must survive in a simulated post-apocalyptic environment.

Casting was done by Metal Flowers Media. The first season had 10 main cast members as well as almost 100 actors who did additional scripted and improvisational work for the show.

== Seasons ==
=== Season 1 ===
The first season was filmed at and around 516 S Anderson St, Los Angeles, CA 90033, and follows ten cast members in an environment that simulates life after the collapse of civilization due to a catastrophic epidemic. The volunteers tend to many aspects of sustainable living including the essentials: water, electricity, security and food. Insights into psychology, security, and technology are also given by experts. The season first aired on the Discovery Channel on July 21, 2009. Filming began on February 28, and ran until April 28, 2009.

=== Season 2 ===
Season 2 was filmed at and around 300-498 Southern Place, Chalmette, Louisiana 70043, and follows ten cast members in an environment that simulates life after a global viral outbreak. The season first aired on July 27, 2010.

== See also ==
- Robinsonade
