= Black Gold (American TV series) =

American reality television series

- Season 1 title card
- Country of origin: United States
- No. of seasons: 5
- No. of episodes: 44

Production
- Executive producers: Brent Henderson; Jeff Conroy; Philip D. Segal; Sarah Whalen; Thom Beers
- Running time: 45 minutes
- Production company: Original Productions

Original release
- Network: truTV
- Release: June 18, 2008 – April 4, 2013

Black Gold is a reality-documentary television series that chronicles three oil drilling rigs in Andrews County, Texas, 30 miles northwest of Odessa. It was partly produced by Thom Beers, creator of Deadliest Catch and Ice Road Truckers. The Black Gold theme song was sung by country music star Trace Adkins. The title "Black Gold" comes from a slang term for oil.

Black Gold aired Wednesday nights on truTV at 10pm. It is also shown as a special presentation on TNT in high definition. The show also airs in the United Kingdom on ITV4 and debuted in Australia on A&E on February 4, 2016.

== Series overview ==
=== First season ===
The first season follows three rigs — Longhorn, Viking, and Big Dog—that have only 50 days to successfully locate and retrieve the crude oil. The roughnecks, as they are called on the rig, endure exhausting and dangerous work demands. Oil rigs Longhorn and Viking are funded by wildcatter Mike Lamonica while the Big Dog is funded by wildcatter Autry Stephens, both of whom have put up millions of dollars in hopes of finding new deposits of oil. The show also features pipe salesman Michael “Rooster” McConaughey, brother of actor Matthew McConaughey and a self-made millionaire who stars in the CNBC series West Texas Investors Club. The first season was the highest rated series to date on TruTV.

=== Second season ===
The second season (premiered August 8, 2009) only follows one rig, Big Dog rig number 28, owned by Autry Stephens. The season is centered around the requirement given by Stephens to finish four wells in 50 days in order to maintain the lease on the land. One notable returning character is Gerald Williams, who was fired in the previous season.

=== Third season ===
The third season, premiered September 9, 2010 follows Big Dog rig 28 wildcatting on hostile landowner Peggy Hauser's land.

=== Fourth season ===
The fourth season began on November 30, 2011, airing Wednesdays at 10pm. Again it follows Big Dog rig 28.

=== Fifth season ===
In August 2012, truTV ordered a 10-episode fifth season of the series. The season began airing on December 19, 2012, and the season finale aired February 20, 2013.

=== Sixth season and cancellation ===
On April 4, 2013, Black Gold star Brandon Watson was arrested for driving while under the influence and hit-and-run. Soon after his arrest TruTv removed Black Gold from its website, cancelling the show along with the sixth season, which was set to air December 16, 2013.
