= Alaska Off-Road Warriors =

American reality competition television series (2014–2015)

- Genre: Reality competition
- Country of origin: United States
- Original language: English
- No. of seasons: 1
- No. of episodes: 8

Production
- Executive producers: Dolph Scott; Ed de Rivaz; Elaine Frontain Bryant; Jeff Conroy; Julian P. Hobbs; Philip D. Segal; Sarah Whalen
- Camera setup: Multiple
- Production company: Original Productions

Original release
- Network: History Channel
- Release: November 30, 2014 – January 18, 2015

Alaska Off-Road Warriors is an American reality competition television series on the History Channel. The show follows five teams of two competing in off-road races through the wilderness of Alaska. The series was produced by Original Productions.

== Broadcast ==
The series premiered in the United States on the History Channel on November 30, 2014, and continued weekly.

Internationally, the series premiered in Australia on A&E on February 4, 2015, in New Zealand on The Box on August 29, 2015 and in India on History TV18 on August 25, 2015.

== Episodes ==
| No. | Title | Original release date | U.S. viewers (millions) |
|---|---|---|---|
| 1 | "Blazing Trail" | November 30, 2014 | 993,000 |
| 2 | "River Rage" | December 7, 2014 | 933,000 |
| 3 | "Fallen Warrior" | December 14, 2014 | 912,000 |
| 4 | "Devil's Outhouse" | December 21, 2014 | 1,134,000 |
| 5 | "Red Alert" | December 28, 2014 | 1,415,000 |
| 6 | "Betrayal Trail" | January 4, 2015 | N/A |
| 7 | "Tough As Hell" | January 11, 2015 | 1,253,000 |
| 8 | "Journey's End" | January 18, 2015 | 1,355,000 |
