= Lobster Wars =

American television documentary series

Lobster Wars, also known as Deadliest Catch: Lobstermen in the United Kingdom, is a documentary television series on the Discovery Channel. It documents men and one woman fishing for lobsters off the Georges Bank near the northeastern coast of North America. It first aired on August 23, 2007.

Like the similarly themed Deadliest Catch (a documentary-style reality series based on crab fishing on the Bering Sea), Lobster Wars is produced by Original Productions for Discovery, and is based on a pilot miniseries also produced by Original Productions, Lobstermen: Jeopardy at Sea. Executive Producer Thom Beers narrates the show in the US whereas voice artist Bill Petrie narrates it in the UK. The show features six boats: The Dragon Lady, The Timothy Michael, The William Bowe, The Direction, The Rachel Leah and The Excalibur — a fishing trawler that causes high tensions between the other 5 boats.

== Episodes ==
No. overall	Title	Original release date
1	"The Battle Begins"	August 23, 2007
2	"Pounded by the Storm"	August 30, 2007
3	"Cheating Death and Cashing In"	September 6, 2007
4	"Back to the Battleground"	September 13, 2007
5	"Fighting Fatigue"	September 20, 2007
6	"The Final Push"	September 27, 2007
