= Thom Beers =

American television producer and narrator (born 1952)

- Born: July 20, 1952 (age 74); Batavia, New York, U.S.
- Education: Ithaca College (BA, Communications)
- Occupations: Television producer, narrator, executive
- Years active: 1980–present
- Employers: Original Productions; Fremantle North America
- Known for: Monster Garage; Deadliest Catch; Ice Road Truckers; Ax Men; Storage Wars; Monster House
- Spouse: Melissa Meister
- Children: 1

Thom Beers (born July 20, 1952) is an American television producer, narrator, and media executive best known for creating and producing documentary and reality series about hazardous occupations. He founded Original Productions and later was chief executive officer of Fremantle North America.

== Early life and education ==
Beers was born in Batavia, New York. He attended Ithaca College, earning a bachelor's degree in communications in the 1970s. He began his broadcasting career with Turner Broadcasting System and later worked for Paramount Syndicated Television as a senior producer.

== Career ==
Beers spent two decades in network production and syndication before founding Original Productions in 1999, a company specializing in nonfiction series about difficult and dangerous work environments. Among its productions are Deadliest Catch, Ice Road Truckers, Ax Men, Monster Garage, Storage Wars, and PitchMen. Beers also provided narration for many of these series, developing a gravel-toned vocal style that became a signature of “tough jobs” television.

In 2009, FremantleMedia acquired Original Productions, appointing Beers as CEO of FremantleMedia North America. He oversaw both Original Productions and Fremantle's U.S. operations, managing shows such as America’s Got Talent, The Price Is Right, and The X Factor USA. Beers left Fremantle in 2016 and founded Bobcat TV, a digital studio producing factual content for streaming platforms.

== Style and themes ==
Media analysts credit Beers with popularizing the “dangerous work” subgenre of reality television. Scholar Peter Thompson writes that Beers's Coal and Deadliest Catch portray “manual labor as both sacred duty and spectacle,” emphasizing masculine endurance and camaraderie. A separate analysis of Deadliest Catch identified its narrative as “a cinematic valorization of working-class heroism under capitalist precarity.” The New York Times credited Beers with shaping Discovery Channel's early 2000s brand identity around “authentic, perilous occupations.”

== Awards ==
Beers and Original Productions have earned multiple Primetime Emmy Awards for Deadliest Catch and a Producers Guild of America Award for Outstanding Producer of Non-Fiction Television. According to the Television Academy database, Beers has received over twenty Emmy nominations and three wins as executive producer.

=== Selected awards and nominations ===
Year	Award	Category	Work	Result
2014	Primetime Emmy Award	Outstanding Unstructured Reality Program	Deadliest Catch	Won
2015	Primetime Emmy Award	Outstanding Unstructured Reality Program	Deadliest Catch	Nominated
2011	Producers Guild of America Award	Outstanding Producer of Non-Fiction Television	Deadliest Catch	Won
2010	CableACE Award	Documentary or Special Programming	Deadliest Catch	Won

== Selected filmography ==
Year	Title	Role	Network
2003–12	Monster Garage	Executive producer	Discovery Channel
2005–present	Deadliest Catch	Executive producer / narrator	Discovery Channel
2007–14	Ice Road Truckers	Producer / narrator	History Channel
2008–16	Ax Men	Producer / narrator	History Channel
2010–15	Storage Wars	Executive producer / narrator	A&E
2009–10	PitchMen	Executive producer / narrator	Discovery Channel
2019	American Farm	Executive producer	History Channel

== Personal life ==
Beers is married to Melissa Meister. He has one child, Max, from his previous marriage and a step son, Arrow. He resides in Los Angeles, California.
