= Zainab Johnson =

American comedian

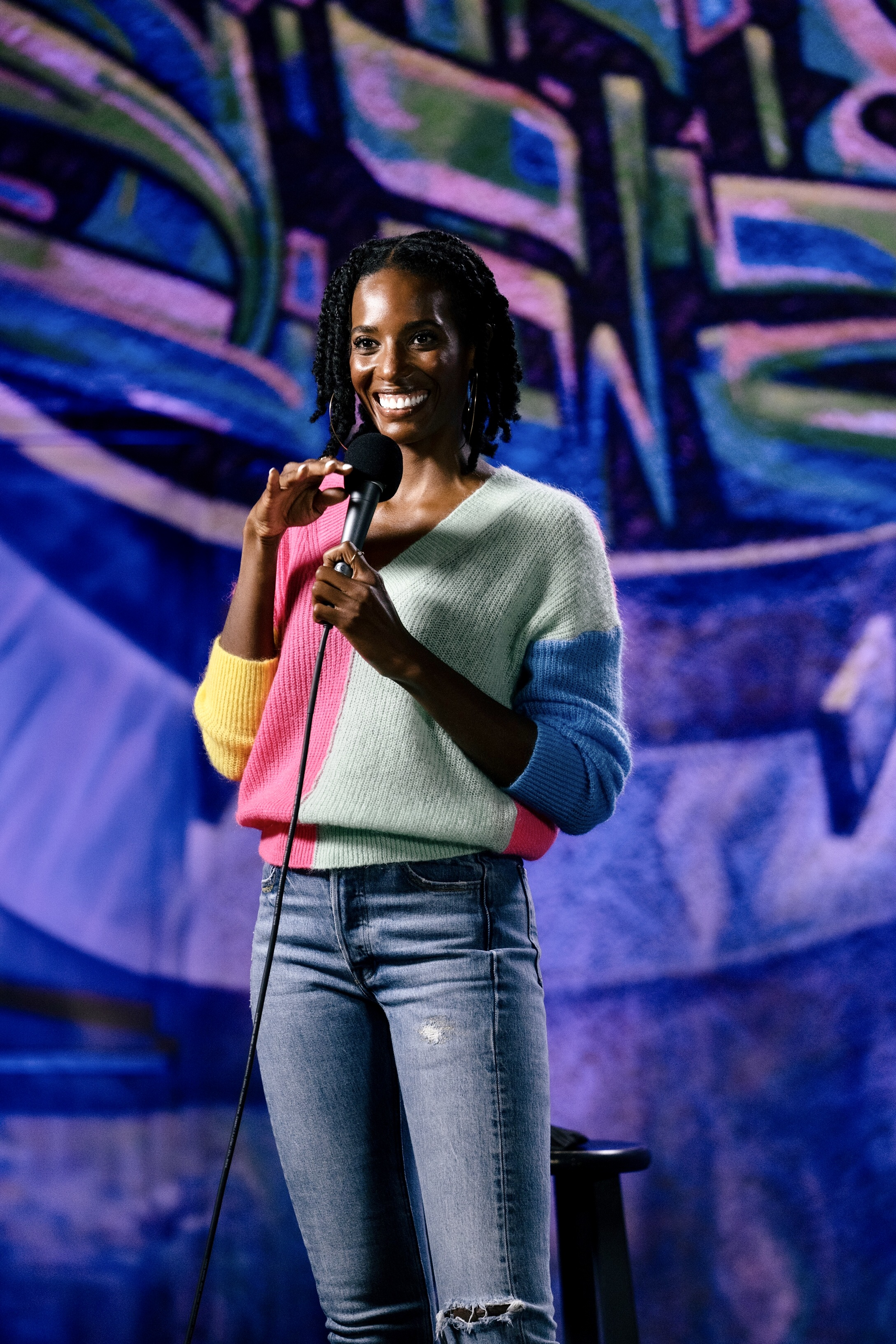
- Johnson on Keep Your Distance in 2020.
- Born: March 22; Brooklyn, New York, U.S.
- Education: City College of New York
- Occupations: Comedian, actress, podcaster
- Years active: 2006, 2010–present
- Known for: Upload, Last Comic Standing

Zainab Johnson (born March 22) is an American stand-up comedian, actress and internet personality. She debuted her comedy album in 2016, her half-hour television special in 2018 and her hour-long streaming TV special in 2023. Johnson was the winner of ABFF's inaugural 'Comedy Wings' competition in 2013 and was a contestant on NBC's competition TV show Last Comic Standing in 2014. Variety selected her for its '10 Comics to Watch' showcase in 2019. She is known for her role as Aleesha on the Prime Video series Upload (2020–25), as a voice actor on YouTube Original series Tab Time (2021–22), and as co-host of Netflix series 100 Humans (2020).

== Early life and education ==
Zainab Johnson was born in Brooklyn, New York, before her family moved to the Harlem neighborhood of Manhattan when she was five-years-old. She was raised in a Muslim household. Her mother was a homemaker and her father worked for the Metropolitan Transportation Authority (MTA) during her childhood. She is the fifth-eldest child and the third-eldest daughter from among 13 siblings consisting of seven brothers and five sisters. She described her siblings and parents as each having different personalities and interests. Johnson has compared her mother to a hippie and described her father as strict. She wore a hijab during her childhood and faced bullying at school. In second and third grades, she experienced her khimar pulled off from her head. At age 10, Johnson visited Uptown Comedy Club when her mother brought her along.

She was a gifted student who attended high school at Manhattan Center for Science and Mathematics (MCSM). At age 15, she stopped wearing her hijab and used playing basketball as her excuse to convince her father. At age 17, during her senior year, Johnson was forced to quit basketball after visiting Atlanta, Georgia, when she and a friend were hit by an Airborne Express truck by a drunk driver which resulted in her breaking both legs while her friend had to have her leg amputated. Johnson spent one-and-a-half years in recovery and had to learn how to walk again.

She moved back to New York City and attended the City College of New York (CCNY). She did a semester studying acting at the Royal Academy of Dramatic Arts (RADA) in London, England. Johnson and her friends often visited The Comedy Cellar and the Boston Comedy Club where she became acquainted with many stand-up comedians but never considered becoming one. She graduated with a bachelor's degree in mathematics education.

After graduating, she began her career as a fifth grade math teacher, before her father died in 2005. The two tragedies made her reconsider her direction in life and she decided to join a friend to pursue an acting career in Los Angeles, where she began performing in sketch comedy and improvisational theater.

== Career ==
=== 2006–2014 ===
During her first stint in Los Angeles, Johnson performed improv and sketch comedy with the likes of The Groundlings, iO West and Upright Citizens Brigade LA, and appeared as an actor on the first season of prank TV show Hell Date which aired in 2007 on BET. After returning to Hollywood in 2010, she portrayed the role of Billy Tipton on 1000 Ways to Lie which aired on Spike on March 10. That month, Johnson got a job as a production assistant for Jeru Tillman who booked Tuesday night shows at The Comedy Store. Johnson had been eyeing a pair of Chloé boots worth $1,500 on Net-a-Porter when she received the phone call with the job offer. In August 2010, she quit her job and entered an open mic at Amsterdam Cafe in North Hollywood near her home where she performed stand-up comedy for the first time. She guest-starred as Mara on Private Practice on the 18th episode of the fifth season which aired on April 17, 2012 on ABC.

On June 22, 2013, Zainab Johnson became the winner of the American Black Film Festival's inaugural 'Comedy Wings' competition. ABFF announced the event on January 10, with stand-up and sketch comedy video submissions open until March 22. Johnson was one of nine comedians selected to advance to the 'Semi-finals' held in Los Angeles on April 21, before becoming one of four comedians to advance to the 'Finals' in Miami Beach that she won.

In February 2014, she performed stand-up on television for the first time on The Arsenio Hall Show, a revival of the 1990s syndicated variety talk show, and next appeared in a remote location segment which aired in May. Johnson was a contestant on the eighth season of Last Comic Standing which premiered on May 22, 2014 on NBC. Johnson was one of 100 comedians selected from invitees to be on the show where she advanced to the 'Semi-finals' stage but failed to advance to the 'Top Ten', making it to the eighth episode of the 14-episode season which aired on July 3.

Just for Laughs (JFL) selected her for its 'New Faces of Comedy: Unrepped' showcase at their festival in Montreal, Canada, in June 2014. Johnson would go on her first tour as an opener for veteran comedian Jimmy Shubert who she met while competing on Last Comic Standing. She performed on Gotham Comedy Live which aired on AXS TV on August 14, and on Comic View which aired on BET on September 24.

=== 2015–2019 ===
In 2015, she performed as part of the closing ceremony of Black Enterprise's Women of Power summit on March 4. Accompanied by Comedy Wings 2014 winner Amberia Allen and finalist Hadiyah Robinson, the trio were billed as the 'Hey Ladies Comedy Tour' by ABFF founder Jeff Friday. Johnson co-starred in the six-episode webseries Cocktail Confessions which premiered on October 13, and recorded her forthcoming album at The Stand in Manhattan, New York, on November 29.

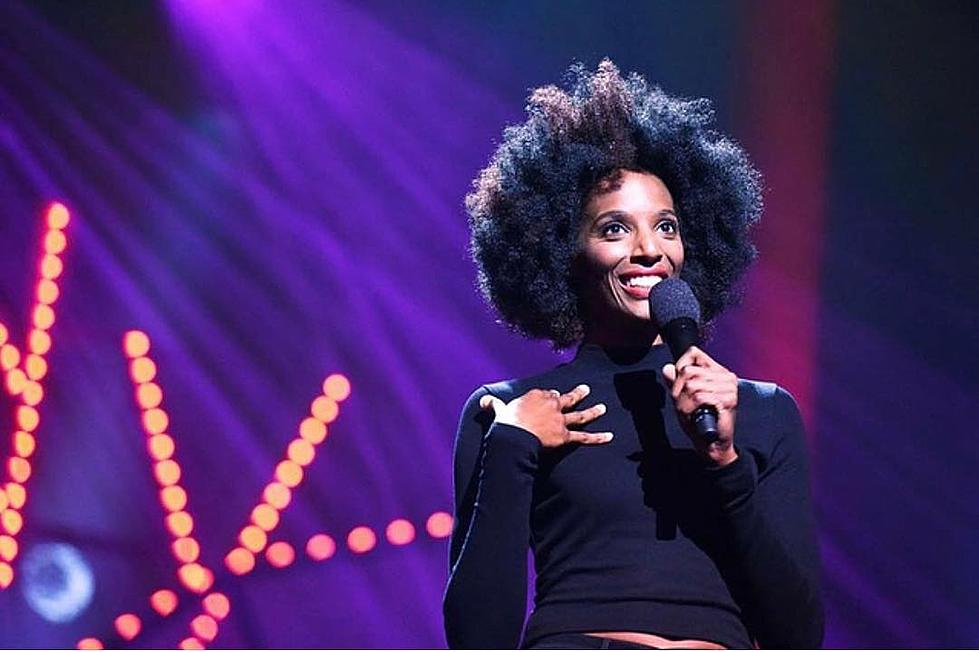
Zainab Johnson at Melbourne International Comedy Festival in March 2018

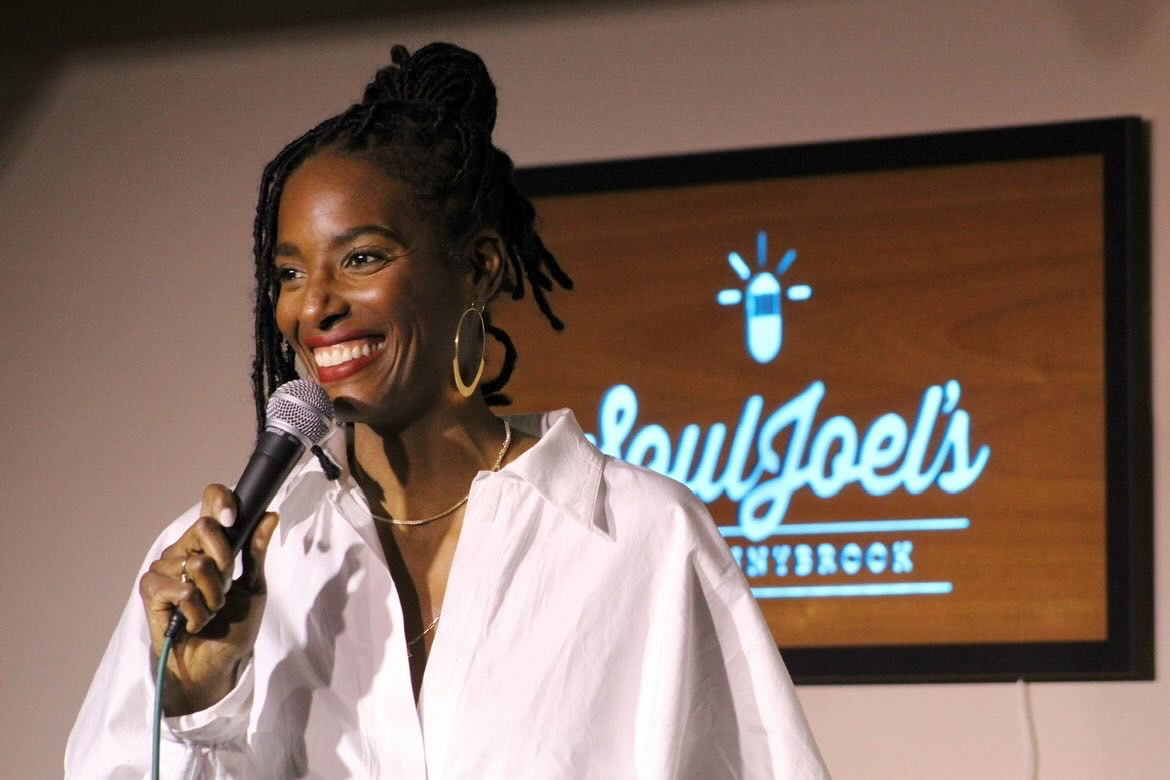
Zainab Johnson at Soul Joel's in Pottstown, PA in January 2024

In 2016, Johnson independently self-released her debut comedy album Model Citizen on February 14. She performed stand-up on Acting Out in its third episode which aired on MTV on October 27, and on the Russell Simmons Presents All Def Comedy television special which aired on HBO on November 12.

On January 17, 2017, it was reported that ABC had bought the rights to develop a sitcom, executive produced by Wanda Sykes and Page Hurwist, starring Zainab Johnson. She was a contestant on Idiotest on GSN on January 19, and on syndicated game show Punchline on August 3. She guest-starred on Amanda Seales' webseries Get Your Life on the fifth episode of the second season which released on February 6; played the role of Tameeka on three episodes of ABC webseries American Koko which released on June 19; and co-starred as Dr. Haniel in webseries Avant-Guardians which released on November 17. Johnson and Alex Weber served as hosts of Discovery Go game show Cash Lift which released on December 17.

In 2018, Johnson made her debut at the Melbourne International Comedy Festival in Victoria, Australia, which opened on March 28. She performed her debut half-hour special on Epix series Unprotected Sets on the premiere episode which aired on October 5.

In 2019, she performed on The Stand-Up Show with Katherine Ryan which aired on The Comedy Network on February 5, and hosted the 2019 Designing Women Awards held by the New York Women in Film & Television (NYWIFT) on June 11. Variety selected Johnson for its '10 Comics to Watch' showcase in Montreal in June.

=== 2020–present ===
In 2020, Johnson, Sammy Obeid and Alie Ward served as hosts of Netflix series 100 Humans which released on March 13. She also has a recurring role in the Prime Video series Upload. She performed on Keep Your Distance on the sixth episode of the first season which released on October 6, and appeared on Struggle Gourmet on the second episode of the first season which aired on October 20.

In 2021, she was a panelist on the first three episodes of History of Swear Words which released on Netflix on January 5, and played the role of Nurse Sherri on "Growing Fangs", the third episode of Disney+ anthology series Launchpad which released on May 28. Johnson was a voice actor on both seasons of YouTube Original children's show Tab Time which premiered on December 1.

In 2022, she was a panelist on the first season of We Need to Talk About America which premiered on Fuse on April 20, and guest-starred as Amira on Ramy on the seventh episode of the third season which released on Hulu on September 30.

In 2023, Johnson debuted her hour-long streaming TV special Hijabs Off as an Amazon Original which released on October 20. It was filmed at the late-19th-century Croton Aqueduct Gate House in Upper Manhattan. Vulture ranked it 7th in its list of 'The Best Comedy Specials of 2023' on December 6. Uproxx included it in its list of 'The Best Stand-Up Comedy of 2023'.

In 2025, she hosted the ABFF Honors in February 17, and made her debut at the Edinburgh Festival Fringe in Scotland, United Kingdom, which opened on August 1. Vulture included Johnson in its list of 'The Comedians You Should and Will Know of 2025' on September 15.

== Influences ==
Johnson has described watching Comic View, The Original Kings of Comedy (2000) and The Queens of Comedy (2001) growing up, with Eddie Murphy's Raw (1987) being her favorite stand-up comedy release and Coming to America (1988) her favorite film. She would go on to become acquainted with Murphy and describes having attended parties at his home in Los Angeles. In a September 2022 interview, she described Wanda Sykes, Dave Chappelle, Kevin Hart and Chris Rock as comedians she enjoys. Johnson has named Whoopi Goldberg, Martin Lawrence, Adele Givens, Sommore, Sheryl Underwood, Bill Burr and Mike Epps as comedians she's been a fan of growing up. She has named B-Phlat, Marina Franklin, Pat Brown, Patrice O'Neal, Burr and Epps as comedians she watched live at comedy clubs during her college years.

In a March 2023 interview, when asked to list her choice of top three films with female leads, she named Waiting To Exhale (1995), What's Love Got to Do with It (1993) and Eve's Bayou (1997).

== Personal life ==
She sported a shaved head for seven years between 2009 and 2016. She is 5 feet 11 inches in height.

== Filmography and discography ==
=== Stand-up comedy releases ===
Solo albums and TV specials
Title	Release date	Debut medium
Model Citizen	February 14, 2016	Audio streaming
Unprotected Sets: Zainab Johnson	October 5, 2018	Television (Epix)
Hijabs Off	October 20, 2023	Streaming TV (Prime Video)
The Notebook	September 18, 2024	Streaming TV (YouTube)
Zainab Johnson: Toxically Optimistic	October 27, 2026	Streaming TV (Netflix)

Collaborative albums and TV specials
Title	Release date	Debut medium
Russell Simmons Presents All Def Comedy	November 12, 2016	Television (HBO)
Just for Laughs: Premium – Volume 46	February 13, 2019	Audio streaming
Comedy in Color 2: Volume 3	March 22, 2022	Audio streaming
Just for Laughs: Select – Volume 29	August 12, 2024	Audio streaming

=== Television ===
Year	Title	Role	Note
2007	Hell Date	Various	3 episodes
2010	1000 Ways to Lie	Billy Tipton	
2012	Private Practice	Mara	Episode: "It Was Inevitable"
2014	The Arsenio Hall Show	Herself	2 episodes
2014	Last Comic Standing	Herself	Contestant; 4 episodes
2014	Gotham Comedy Live	Herself	
2014	Comic View	Herself	
2015	Cocktail Confessions	Herself	Main cast; 6 episodes
2016	Acting Out	Herself	Episode 3
2017	Idiotest	Herself	Contestant
2017	Get Your Life	Herself	
2017	American Koko	Tameeka	3 episodes
2017	Punchline	Herself	Contestant
2017	Avant-Guardians	Dr. Haniel	Main cast; 7 episodes
2017	Cash Lift	Herself	Co-host; 5 episodes
2018	Late Night with Seth Meyers	Herself	
2019	The Stand-Up Show with Katherine Ryan	Herself	
2020	Lights Out with David Spade	Herself	3 episodes
2020	100 Humans	Herself	Co-host; 8 episodes
2020	Keep Your Distance	Herself	Episode 6
2020	Struggle Gourmet	Herself	Episode 2
2020, 2022	The Drew Barrymore Show	Herself	2 episodes
2020–2025	Upload	Aleesha Morrison-Downey	Main cast; 29 episodes
2021	History of Swear Words	Herself	3 episodes
2021	Launchpad	Nurse Sherri	Episode: "Growing Fangs"
2021–2022	Tab Time	Various	Main cast: 14 episodes
2022	Bust Down	Ito	Episode: "Beige Rage"
2022	A Black Lady Sketch Show	Various	Episode: "Save My Edges, I'm a Donor!"
2022	We Need to Talk About America	Herself	Main cast; 10 episodes
2022	Ramy	Amira	Episode: "Second Opinion Doctor"
2023	The Conor Moore Show	Boss	
2024	After Midnight	Herself	Contestant
2024	The Art Of	Herself	Documentary; Episode: "Being Funny"

=== Podcasting and YouTubing ===
Title	Episodes		First released	Last released	Note
Just Friends	66				
Just Friends	66	1	July 9, 2015		Audio podcast co-hosted with Sydney Castillo.
Just Friends	66	52	October 20, 2015	January 30, 2017	Audio podcast co-hosted with Sydney Castillo.
Just Friends	66	14	June 18, 2020	October 1, 2020	Video podcast co-hosted with Sydney Castillo.
HonesTEA with Z	154				
HonesTEA with Z	154	153	January 24, 2018	March 2, 2022	Audio podcast; Live-audience finale recorded and co-hosted with Yamaneika Saunders at Just for Laughs in Montreal, Quebec.
HonesTEA with Z	154	1	August 10, 2022		Audio podcast; Live-audience finale recorded and co-hosted with Yamaneika Saunders at Just for Laughs in Montreal, Quebec.
I'm Reasonable	TBD		February 22, 2024	In progress	YouTube show, occasionally live-streamed.
