= Alie Ward =

American writer and painter

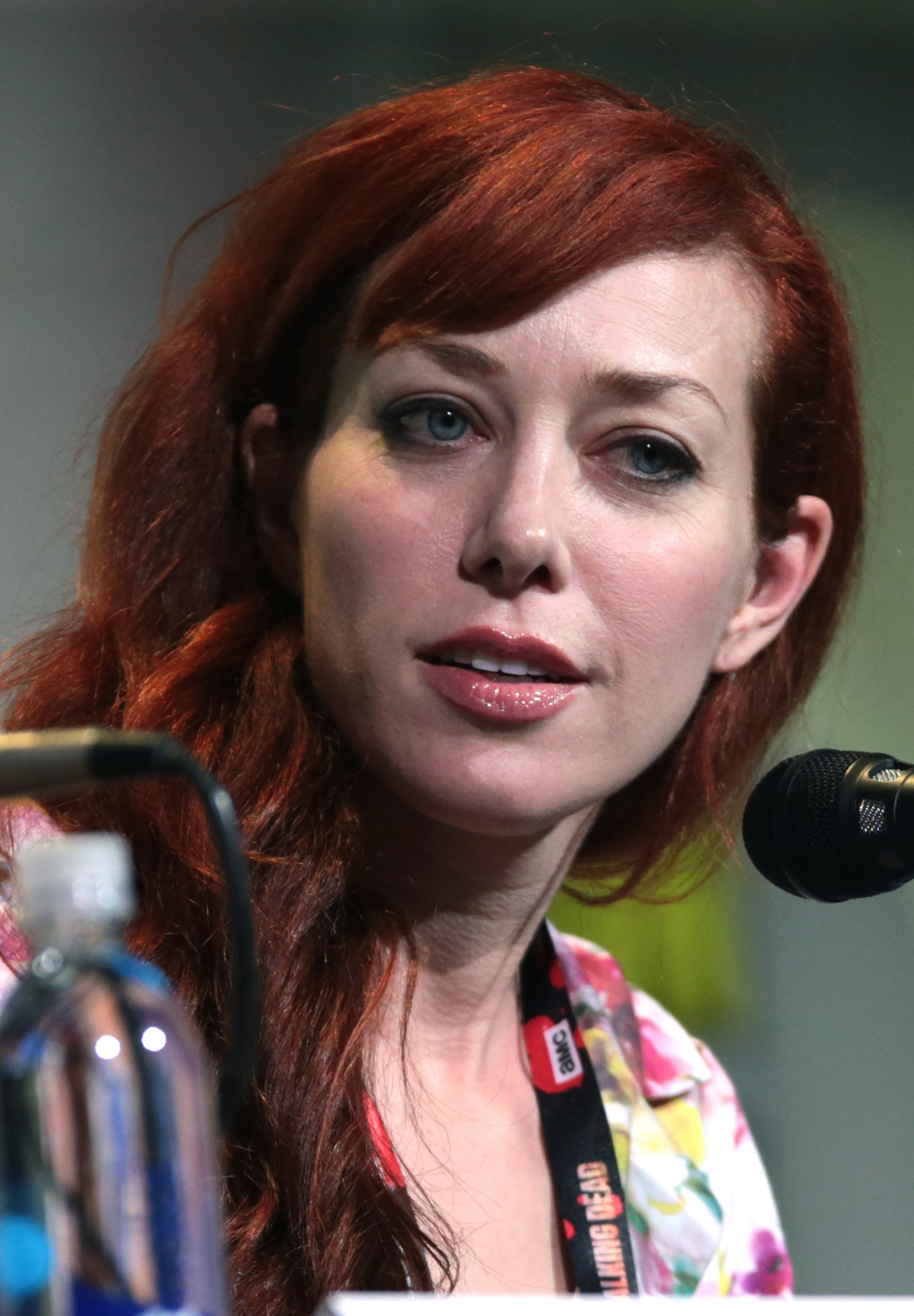
- Ward at the 2016 San Diego Comic-Con
- Born: Alison Ann Ward; November 6, 1976 (age 49); San Francisco, California, U.S.
- Education: University of California, Santa Barbara
- Occupations: Actress, writer, painter
- Years active: 1998–present
- Spouse: Jarrett Sleeper (m. 2021)
- Website: www.alieward.com

Alison Ann "Alie" Ward (born November 6, 1976) is an American writer, actress, and television and podcast host. Born in California, Ward graduated from the University of California, Santa Barbara with a degree in cinema. In 2016, she won an Emmy for Outstanding Writing Special Class for the CBS series Innovation Nation. In 2022, the iHeartRadio Podcast Awards named her podcast Ologies "Best Science Podcast", and the Webby Awards honored Ward as "Best Podcast Host." In 2025, Time Magazine included Ologies on its list of "The 100 Best Podcasts of All Time."

On television, Ward has appeared as a recurring role in Nash Bridges and in several small roles for shows including Grey's Anatomy, King of the Hill, and Comedy Central's Key & Peele. Ward has recorded a number of fan recaps for the ABC series Once Upon a Time, Revenge, and Scandal. She has also illustrated and been a columnist for LA Weekly and cohosted the Netflix show 100 Humans.

== Early life ==
Ward was born Alison Ann Ward in San Francisco, California, to Nancy, an accountant, and Lawrence, a journalist and news broadcaster. She has two older sisters, Celeste and Janelle. Ward moved frequently around northern California during her childhood due to her father's career, living in Tahoe, Sacramento, El Dorado Hills, and Cameron Park before returning to the Bay Area. When she was 18, she enrolled at University of California, Santa Barbara to study biology, with the intention of pursuing a career in biological illustration. Eventually, she changed her course of study and obtained a degree in cinema at San Francisco State University before moving to Los Angeles. Her father had multiple myeloma.

== Career ==
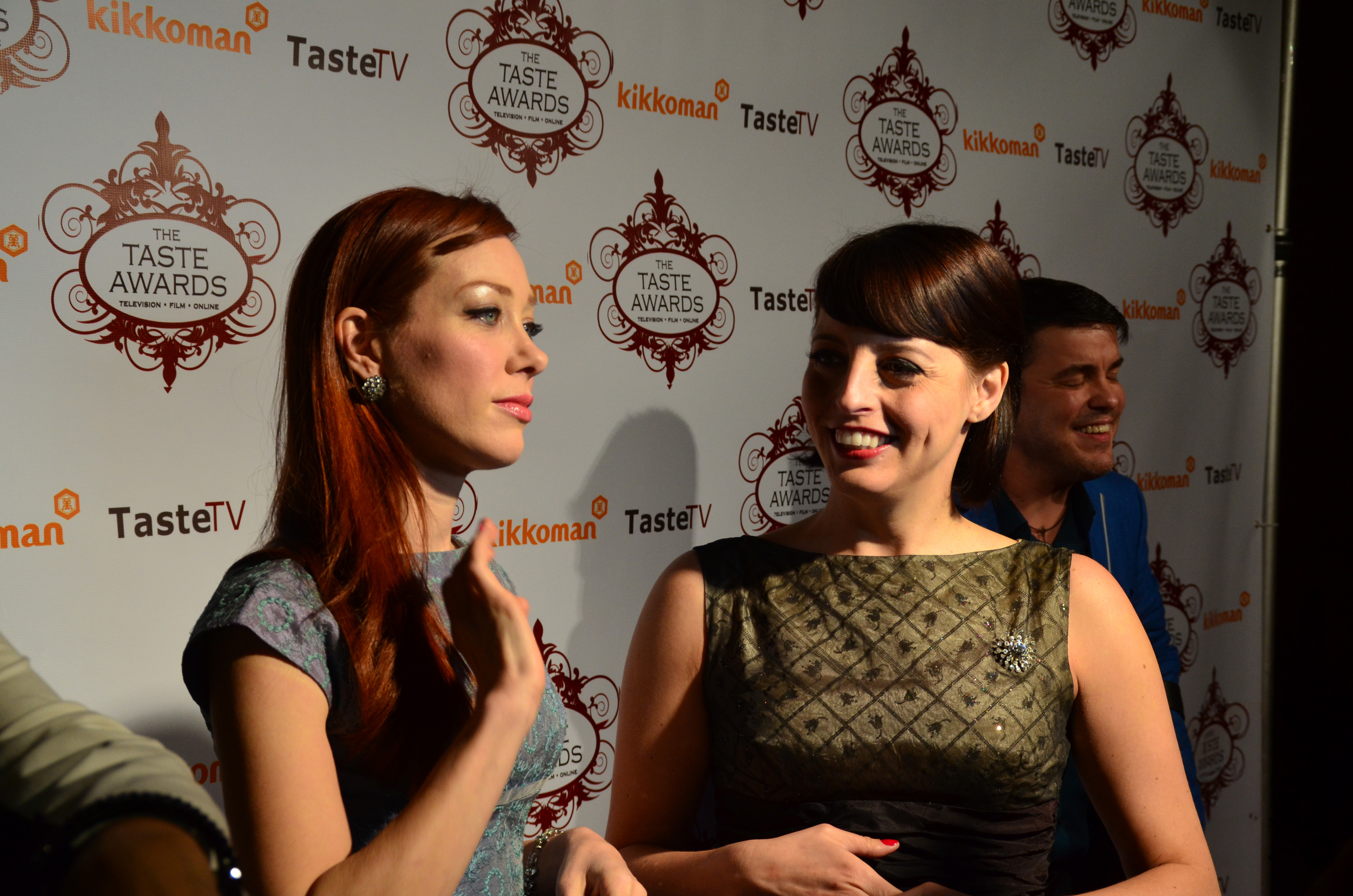
Ward (left) and Georgia Hardstark at the 6th Annual Taste Awards

=== Acting, media, and journalism ===
While studying cinema in San Francisco, Ward attended an audition for the television series Nash Bridges, which filmed in the area. She was cast as Miranda, a role that recurred for three seasons. After moving to Los Angeles, Ward continued to take television roles but noticed she received mostly "victim"-type roles during a crime show boom, which she developed a distaste for after she was mugged in 2002. She began pursuing painting as a therapeutic hobby and a form of self expression, leading to roles in media, with Ward describing the change as "I felt like I went from not having a voice to having my voice being my identity and my job, which was really gratifying."

Ward comes from a family of journalists. In late 2005, L.A. Weekly hired her to illustrate the column 24/7 and in early 2006 she was offered a writing assignment to cover a concert. Within a few months, Ward had a weekly nightlife and culture column called The Mental Ward. Ward also wrote for the Los Angeles Times and for Metromix L.A., a website and newspaper owned by the Los Angeles Times, as well as appearing on-camera for live news segments on KTLA.

Ward's paintings are often acrylic on wood and employ wordplay or are in diptych form, which she calls her "dichotomy series". She likens her painting approach to sign making. In 2014, LA Weekly named Ward's Instagram account "Best Looking Instagram".

=== Alie and Georgia ===
In early 2009, Ward and her friend Georgia Hardstark created a cocktail called the McNuggetini, drafting plans on the back of a popcorn bag at the L.A. dive bar The Roost. Hardstark blogged about it on the website This Recording. After the extreme food aggregation website This is why you're fat linked to the recipe, it became virally popular. Hardstark and Ward next shot a short instructional video, directed by friend and director of Key & Peele Peter Atencio, and posted it to YouTube in October 2009. The video became the most watched how-to video at the time with over 10,000 hits per day. The pair followed up with two farcical how-to videos for the Ham Daiquiri and a Bloody-Maryesque drink known as the Bloody Bacon & Cheese. Next, Ward and Hardstark began making "Classy Ladies with Alie & Georgia" cocktail videos for Scripps Network and Cooking Channel websites, and appearing on the Cooking Channel travel-dessert show Unique Sweets.

Ward and Hardstark collaborated on several other projects. Their Feral Audio podcast Slumber Party with Alie & Georgia premiered in 2012 and ran for 93 episodes until its end in 2017. In June 2013, their travel-food show Tripping Out with Alie & Georgia premiered on Cooking Channel. Giada De Laurentiis was an executive producer of the show. In August 2013, the two appeared in Drunk History for an episode on Lewis and Clark.

=== Pivot into science communication ===
Inspired by a visit to the Natural History Museum of Los Angeles County in 2013 that led into a weekly volunteer shift, Ward quit her previous job. She began working in science communications media as a correspondent on the CBS series Innovation Nation, for which she won an Emmy for Outstanding Writing Special Class in 2016. The experience of volunteering at the museum and working in science communication further gave her inspiration for starting her podcast Ologies.

In 2018, she became a regular contributor on the Netflix educational series Brainchild and began hosting the CW show Did I Mention Invention? With Alie Ward.

In 2020, she co-hosted Netflix's first season of the investigative series 100 Humans alongside Sammy Obeid and Zainab Johnson.

In 2022 "Orgasmic Birth and Lifelong Sexuality With Debra Pascali-Bonaro and Logan Levkoff, facilitated by Alie Ward" is the 84th episode of the Rosebud Woman podcast, released on October 20, 2022. This episode is part of a special series featuring live talks recorded at Sensing Woman 2022, a multisensory event held at C24 Gallery in Chelsea, New York City.

=== Ologies podcast ===
In 2017 Ward began hosting Ologies, a science podcast. Ward interviews a different expert each week, with episodes including topics such as volcanology, primatology, paleontology, gemology, cosmetology, cosmology and horology. The tagline for the show is "Ask smart people stupid questions".

The podcast has won several awards since 2019, including from iHeartRadio Podcast Awards, Webby Awards, and The Shorty Awards. Major publications such as Wired, Time Magazine, and Town & Country have included Ologies on their lists of best podcasts.

== Personal life ==
At the end of a podcast episode in January 2021, Ward shared that she became engaged to her boyfriend of about ten years, Jarrett Sleeper. They were married in July 2021. As of 2021, she lives in Eagle Rock, California.

== Filmography ==
Year	Title	Role	Notes
1998	Nash Bridges	Miranda	9 episodes
1999	Where's George	Anita	
2001	Roswell	Deb	2 episodes
2002	King of the Hill	Becky	Episode: "Dang Ol' Love" (uncredited)
2002	The District	Mary Sleight	Episode: "The Second Man"
2003	7th Heaven	Betty	Episode: "Smoking"
2005	Grey's Anatomy	Tina Herman	Episode: "Something To Talk About"
2006	Death Ride	Make-up Girl	
2012	Key & Peele	Friend	1 episode
2012	Murderbot Productions		Episode: "Hose the Rose"
2013	Drunk History	Herself - Narrator	Episode: "Nashville"
2017	Sidekick with Matt Mira	Guest	Episode: "Your Host, Steve Agee"
2018	Don't Go Alone	The Storyteller	3 episodes
2018	Brainchild	Science Lady	13 episodes
2020	100 Humans	Host	8 episodes
