= Marcus Monroe =

American actor

- Occupations: Television, film actor
- Website: marcusmonroe.com

Marcus Monroe is an actor/juggler/TV personality currently living in New York City. He moved to New York in 2004 to pursue a career in entertainment. Marcus has appeared on many TV shows including MTV's TRL, ABC Family's Switched!, Nickelodeon's Slime Across America and was the host of Discovery Kids' Mad Science. He also appeared in the 2000 film adaptation of the book Wisconsin Death Trip. He is an original member of the Shoebox Tour with Jay Gilligan. Monroe, along with Ben Seidman and Luke Jermay is a founding member of The Optical Delusions, a 2008 touring show that billed itself as "an evening of new-school variety."

Monroe claims he created the knorch – a combination knife and fire-torch used for juggling stunts.

Marcus is also a frequent performer on the Carnival, Disney, and Royal Caribbean Cruise Lines.
