= 100 Humans =

- Genre: Reality
- Country of origin: United States
- Original language: English
- No. of seasons: 1
- No. of episodes: 8

Production
- Running time: 32–41 minutes

Original release
- Release: March 13, 2020

100 Humans is an American reality television series that premiered in 2020. The show follows 100 people as they go through different experiments studying human behavior. It is based on the Dutch TV program Het Instituut, broadcast in 2016 and 2017.

== Cast ==
- Alie Ward (host)
- Zainab Johnson (host)
- Sammy Obeid (host)
- Komalpreet Batth
- Haley Bockrath
- Dylan George
- Alley Kerr
- Lakrishi Kindred
- Jessica-Lee Korkes
- Charlotte Laws
- Aaron Louie
- Aneiszka Sea
- Joseph Garrett
- Tyanta Snow
- Alan Squats
- Alfredo Tavares
- Ryan Zamo
- Ngozika Okeke
- Khyran Shank
- David Eby
- Avalon Warren
- Erik Anthony Russo
- Belinda Cai
- Janelle Hopkins
- Dallas Washburn

== Release ==
100 Humans was released on March 13, 2020, on Netflix.

== Episodes ==
No.	Title	Original release date
1	"What Makes Us Attractive?"	March 13, 2020
2	"The Best Age to Be Alive"	March 13, 2020
3	"Let’s Talk About Sex"	March 13, 2020
4	"Are You Biased?"	March 13, 2020
5	"Pain vs. Pleasure"	March 13, 2020
6	"How to Be Happy"	March 13, 2020
7	"Can You Trust Your Senses?"	March 13, 2020
8	"Ask a Human"	March 13, 2020
