= The Pradeeps of Pittsburgh =

2024 American TV series

- Release poster
- Genre: Comedy
- Created by: Vijal Patel
- Showrunner: Vijal Patel
- Starring: Sindhu Vee; Naveen Andrews; Sahana Srinivasan; Arjun Sriram; Ashwin Sakthivel; Nicholas Hamilton; Ethan Suplee; Megan Hilty
- Composer: Linda Perry
- Country of origin: United States
- Original language: English
- No. of seasons: 1
- No. of episodes: 8

Production
- Executive producers: Vijal Patel; Sara Gilbert; Tom Werner; Mandy Summers; Jordana Mollick; Michael Showalter
- Producers: Farhan Arshad; Emily Crook; Alex Jordan; Natasha Kanury; Tom Summers
- Production locations: Toronto, Ontario
- Cinematography: Mitchell Ness
- Editors: Brent Carpenter; William Marrinson; Jamie Conklin; Dawn Minkow
- Camera setup: Single-camera
- Running time: 26–33 minutes
- Production companies: Not I.T. Productions; Sara + Tom; Semi-Formal Productions; Amazon MGM Studios; Sony Pictures Television

Original release
- Network: Amazon Prime Video; Amazon Freevee
- Release: October 17, 2024

The Pradeeps of Pittsburgh is an American comedy television series created by Vijal Patel. It premiered on Amazon Prime Video and Amazon Freevee on October 17, 2024. The series stars Sindhu Vee, Naveen Andrews, Sahana Srinivasan, Arjun Sriram, Ashwin Sakthivel, Nicholas Hamilton, Ethan Suplee and Megan Hilty and is produced by Amazon MGM Studios and Sony Pictures Television. This was also the last series to be released on Amazon Freevee before the service was discontinued in September 2025.

In February 2025, the series was cancelled after one season.

== Plot ==
The series focuses on the Pradeep family who has successfully moved from India to the United States to start a new experience in the country. The series is told in flashbacks from an interrogation room, which sometimes allow very different conclusions to be drawn about what happened.

The central narrative of the story explores the inquiry conducted by two agents from the offices of the U.S. Immigration and Naturalization Service surrounding the arson of the Mills' residence, specifically questioning the motives behind the act and the identity of the perpetrator. The Mills family, particularly Janice, harbors suspicions that certain members of the Pradeep family may have orchestrated the fire due to underlying personal grievances against various members of the Mills household.

The Pradeeps are at risk of deportation due to two primary factors: their alleged involvement in the arson of the Mill's residence and Mr. Pradeep's failure to secure the necessary investment to maintain his business contract with SpaceX.

The plot further complicates when Bhanu Pradeep, a member of the Pradeep family, becomes pregnant by her boyfriend, Stu Mills, the son of the Mills family. This development serves as a pivotal element that enables the Pradeep family to remain in the United States while the identity of the arsonist remains unresolved and shrouded in ambiguity.

== Cast ==
=== Main ===
- Sindhu Vee as Sudha Pradeep
- Naveen Andrews as Mahesh Pradeep
- Sahana Srinivasan as Bhanu Pradeep
- Arjun Sriram as Kamal Pradeep
- Ashwin Sakthivel as Vinod Pradeep
- Nicholas Hamilton as Stu Mills
- Ethan Suplee as Jimbo Mills
- Megan Hilty as Janice Mills

=== Recurring ===
- Pete Holmes as Dark Suit
- Romy Rosemont as Light Suit
- Beatrice Schneider as Willa
- Romy Weltman as Lexi

== Episodes ==
| No. | Title | Directed by | Written by | Original release date |
|---|---|---|---|---|
| 1 | "Interrogation Log #1" | Michael Showalter | Vijal Patel | October 17, 2024 |
| 2 | "Interrogation Log #2" | Satya Bhabha | Vijal Patel | October 17, 2024 |
| 3 | "Interrogation Log #3" | Satya Bhabha | Vijal Patel | October 17, 2024 |
| 4 | "Interrogation Log #4" | Smriti Mundhra | Natasha Kanury | October 17, 2024 |
| 5 | "Interrogation Log #5" | Carey Williams | Sonali Mehta Bhandari & Alix Bloom & Benji Hall Kahn | October 17, 2024 |
| 6 | "Interrogation Log #6" | Carey Williams | Lisa K. Nelson | October 17, 2024 |
| 7 | "Interrogation Log #7" | Gail Mancuso | Farhan Arshad | October 17, 2024 |
| 8 | "Interrogation Log #8" | Gail Mancuso | Vijal Patel | October 17, 2024 |

== Production ==
The eight-part series was announced on Amazon Freevee. Principal photography of the series commenced in Pittsburgh and Toronto. The trailer of the series was released on September 18, 2024.

== Reception ==
The review aggregator website Rotten Tomatoes reported a 75% approval rating with an average rating of 5.3/10, based on 8 critic reviews. Deepa Gahlot of Rediff.com awarded the series 2/5 stars. Joly Herman of Common Sense Media rated the series three out of five stars.
