= Luke Jermay =

British magician and mentalist

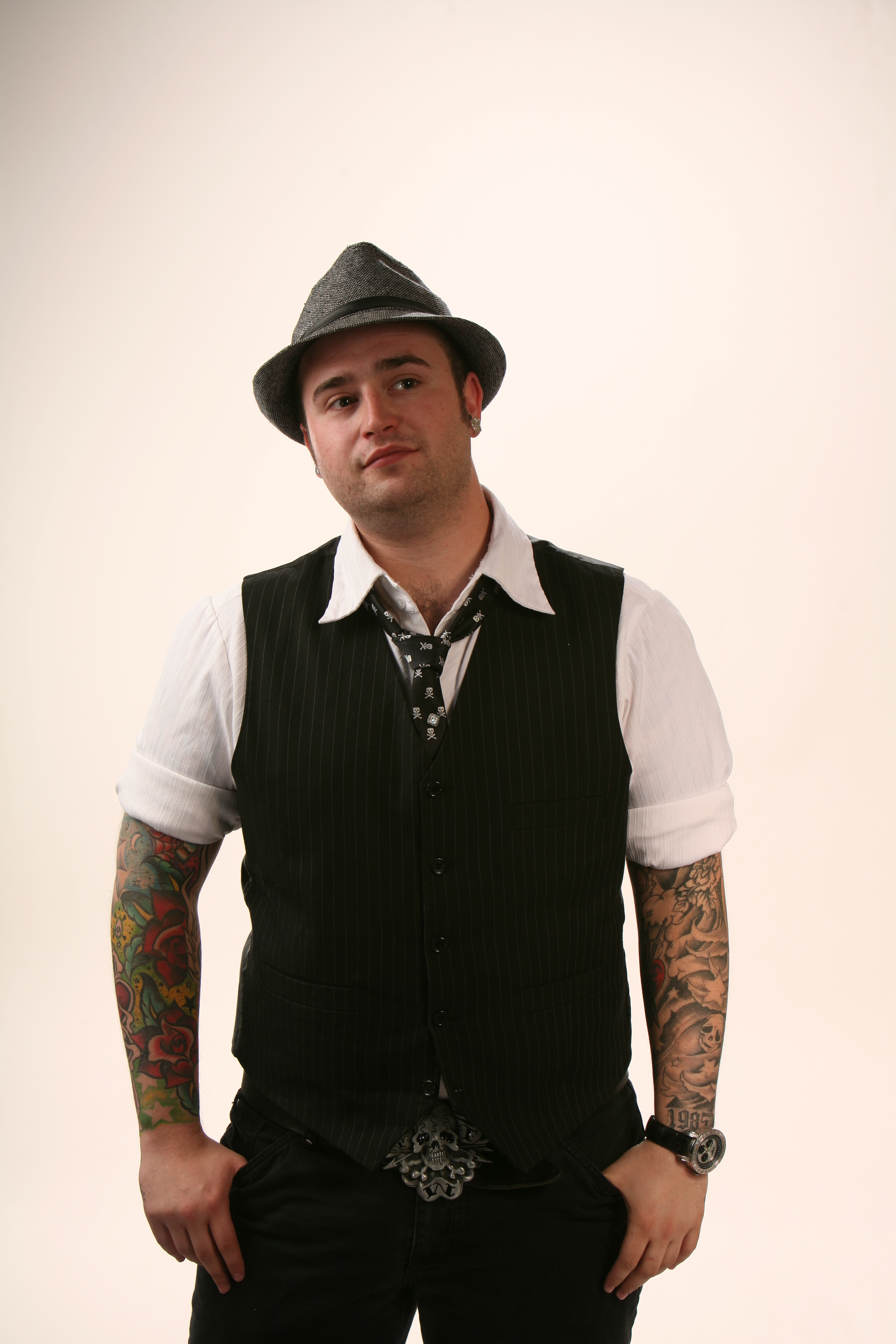
- Born: 7 March 1985 (age 41); Basildon, Essex, England
- Occupations: Illusionist, mind reader, mentalist, magician, writer.
- Spouse: Rachel Leigh Bell (2007–2008)

Luke Jermay (born 7 March 1985) is a British magician, mentalist, and writer.

== Early life ==
Jermay (born Jermey) was born to a single mother, Jacqueline Jermey, on 7 March 1985 in Essex, England. Jermay studied magic and magic theory, has written many books on his art, and has performed magic since age 12. At age 15, he wrote his first published book, 7 Deceptions, which reached international popularity within the magic community.

== Career ==
He has performed in more than 20 countries, including his native United Kingdom and the United States, in venues from local taverns to the London Palladium on 20 December 2002 at the annual International Magic Convention in London, England. Best known for his use of suggestion and the apparent use of covert forms of psychological influence, his trademark routines are a self-induced cessation of his pulse, followed by a perceived stop of a random audience member's pulse, and The Chair Prediction, a routine in which Jermay predicts which chair a spectator will choose to sit in.

Jermay has written 33 books and manuscripts on magic and magic theory, many of which are limited releases. However, four of these have been published and widely circulated by magic companies: 7 Deceptions, Building Blocks, Coral Fang, and 3510.

He has also worked with many other magicians and mentalists as a writer, designer of psychological illusions, and program consultant. His first consulting work was on season 1 of Derren Brown: Mind Control (2000), which he continued on seasons 2 and 3 of Derren Brown: Trick of the Mind (2003–2004). Jermay also worked with Criss Angel on seasons 1 and 2 of Mind Freak (2005–2006), and with Marco Tempest on The Virtual Magician (2004).

In 2008, Jermay, Marcus Monroe, and Ben Seidman were founding members of The Optical Delusions, a touring show billed as "an evening of new-school variety."

He also served as consultant for the television series The Mentalist, which started in 2008.

More recently he has consulted for Dynamo, a UK-based magician from Bradford.

== Published works ==
=== Books ===
- 7 Deceptions. Wonder Wizards. 2000.
- Building Blocks. Alakazam Magic. 2003.
- Coral Fang. Alakazam Magic. 2004.
- 3510. Penguin Magic. 2007.

=== Guest contributions ===
1. Miracles of Suggestion by Kenton Knepper (three effects)
2. The Theta Portfolio by Allen Zingg (one effect)
3. The Garden of The Strange by Caleb Strange (several additions)
4. Meant To Be by John Born (collaboration between Jermay and Banachek)
5. Goats Grimoire by jose prager (collaboration between Jermay and Peter Turner)

=== Feature magazine articles ===
1. The Centre Tear Magazine;
  A series of 6 essays/effects published in the online Magazine "The Centre Tear."
2. MAGIC Magazine;
  A trick-teaching section devoted to Jermay's effects. Most published in other sources.
3. Genii Magazine;
  An ongoing series of essays and effects, and a cover article.
4. MagicSeen:
  Cover article and interview.

=== DVDs ===
1. Skullduggery
2. Induction (not yet published)
3. International Magic Live Lecture.
4. Mind Magic Performance DVD (after show sales only)
5. Emotional Intelligence
6. An Extraordinary Exhibition of Seeing with the Fingertips
7. Colorblind
8. Making Mind Reading Look Real

=== Podcasts ===
1. The performers podcast. www.penguinmagic.com
2. Radio Magic Interviews. www.radiomagic.com

=== TV shows ===
1. Derren Brown (Trick of the Mind Season 3 Writer.)
2. Criss Angel (Mind Freak seasons 1, 2. Writer/director and talking head features.)
3. Marco Tempest (The Virtual Magician Live Show Writer.)
4. The Johnny Vaune Show (resident mind reader performance)
5. The History of Magic (The world's best mind readers. Performance and writer credit)
6. Dynamo magician impossible (series 1&2) (series 2 in the making currently 2 April 2012)
