= 1000 Ways to Die =

American docufiction anthology television series

- Genre: Docufiction; Black comedy; Horror; Anthology
- Written by: Tom McMahon; H. A. Arnarson; Geoff Miller
- Directed by: Will Raee (pilot); Tom McMahon
- Narrated by: Thom Beers (pilot; American broadcast); Ron Perlman (seasons 1–4; American broadcast); "Shotgun Tom" Kelly (season 4; American broadcast); Alisdair Simpson (pilot & series 1–2; British broadcast); Howard Ritchie (series 3–4; British broadcast); John Moore (pilot & series 1–4; Australian broadcast)
- Theme music composer: Richard Haitz
- Opening theme: "Flames" by Richard Haitz
- Composer: Jonathan Thomas Miller
- Country of origin: United States
- Original language: English
- No. of seasons: 4
- No. of episodes: 74 (list of episodes)

Production
- Producers: Thom Beers; Tom McMahon
- Running time: 21 minutes
- Production company: Original Productions

Original release
- Network: Spike
- Release: May 14, 2008 – July 15, 2012

Related
- 1000 Ways to Lie

1000 Ways to Die is an American docufiction anthology television series that originally aired on Spike and later on Comedy Central from May 14, 2008, to July 15, 2012. The series dramatizes unusual deaths, some of which are based on true events or debunked urban legends. It features interviews with experts who discuss the scientific principles behind each case. Until the end of the first season, episodes concluded with real-life footage of near-fatal incidents and interviews with those involved.

Ron Perlman served as narrator beginning with the third episode, following Thom Beers's narration of the first two. "Shotgun Tom" Kelly later replaced Perlman during the final season.

A spin-off special, 1000 Ways to Lie, aired once in 2010, and a graphic novel adaptation was later released. The show received generally mixed to negative reviews during its run.

== Format and style ==
1000 Ways to Die uses a darkly comedic approach to depict deaths drawn from myths and historical incidents through dramatized reenactments of the fatal incidents, accompanied by witness testimonials, scientific explanations and computer-generated imagery (CGI). Names, locations, and other details were often altered for narrative effect. Despite its title, the series depicted only 497 deaths, with some international versions increasing the total to 517.

While some segments were based on actual events such as the deaths of Harry Houdini, Jack Daniel, Mary Mallon, and Sigurd Eysteinsson, others incorporated fictionalized or exaggerated elements for dramatic purposes. A recurring theme involves individuals whose reckless, ill-considered or immoral actions lead to their deaths, often portrayed as ironic consequences of their own behavior. Segment titles commonly feature puns or wordplay related to the manner of death. Some deaths depicted in the series have been nominated for or received a Darwin Award.

=== Opening sequence ===
Each episode of 1000 Ways to Die opens with a disclaimer warning viewers not to recreate or imitate the incidents shown. Several variations of this warning were used throughout the program's run and across different broadcast regions.

In the original United States airing, the disclaimer stated that the stories were based on real deaths and were "extremely graphic," ending with the phrase: "Do not attempt to try any of the actions depicted... you will die!" It also included a disclaimer stating that the names of the deceased had been changed to protect their identities.

International versions featured localized adaptations. The United Kingdom broadcast added the line, "Some of the dead were unlucky; many were bored; most were incredibly stupid," while the Australian version retained the American wording with minor alterations.

Following the warning, a narration introduces the series' premise, which presents different types and circumstances of death including germs, toxins, injury, illness, and catastrophe.

== Production ==
The series was created by Thom Beers and produced by Original Productions, a company founded by Beers. The two pilot episodes had a different style from the main series and were narrated by Beers for the American broadcast.

For the American broadcast, Ron Perlman narrated the series before being replaced by "Shotgun Tom" Kelly for the final episodes.

For the British broadcast, Alisdair Simpson narrated the pilot and series 1–2, followed by Howard Ritchie for series 3–4. John Moore narrated the pilot and series 1–4 for the Australian broadcast.

=== Broadcast history ===
Spike ordered additional episodes of the series in April 2009, including a pilot for the proposed spin-off 1000 Ways to Lie. In January 2010, the network ordered a third season. In October 2011, Spike ordered a fourth season consisting of 13 episodes, which was scheduled to premiere in March 2012.

Production was halted in February 2012 following a labor dispute involving the production company and crew members. Spike confirmed that production on the fourth season had concluded.

== Series overview ==
Season	Episodes	Originally released	
Season	Episodes	First released	Last released
1	12	May 14, 2008	April 5, 2009
2	12	December 6, 2009	February 24, 2010
3	42	August 3, 2010	February 29, 2012
4	8	March 12, 2012	July 15, 2012

== Episodes ==
=== Season 1 (2008–09) ===
No. overall	No. in season	Title	Original release date
1	1	"Life Will Kill You"	May 14, 2008
A gun enthusiast meets his end with a rattlesnake; a young woman's sex life ends prematurely; and a bug collector suffers a fatal bite from a black widow. Ways to Die: "Semi-cide" (#208), "Constriction Accident" (#422), "Fang Banged" (#92), "Lesbocution" (#832), "Love Bugged" (#125), "Tumble Die" (#640) Way to Live: Paramedic Mike Staley
2	2	"Hard Lives, Easy Deaths"	May 21, 2008
A meat packer impregnates his employer's granddaughter and later meets his end in a mysteriously locked freezer; three friends learn the perils of scuba diving and flying on the same day; two brothers feud over land until one seeks revenge through a witch doctor's poison, only to fall victim himself; and a man wearing a homemade merman costume attempts to swim with fish but drowns instead. Ways to Die: "Freeze Died" (#293), "Dive Bombed" (#713), "De-Coffinated" (#91), "Wet Dream" (#606), "Fur Burger" (#112) Way to Live: Parachute Jumper Shayna Richardson
3	3	"Death Over Easy"	February 8, 2009
A smoker gets burned; a beautiful dreamer can't wake up; an inmate is caught in a deadly wire; costumed freaks go wild; a pool shark bites off more than he can swallow; and a peeping pervert finds himself in the ultimate night shack. Ways to Die: "Butt F***ed" (#316), "Frightmare" (#818), "Oprah Winfried" (#97), "Em-Bear-Assed" (#412), "Midnight Choker" (#625), "Window Pained" (#269), "Broke-Back Cowboy" (#133) (Note: This segment was unaired in the original broadcast and was only shown in certain countries.) Way to Live: Helicopter Pilot Benjamin Moore
4	4	"Unforced Errors"	February 8, 2009
A lawyer falls; a wood chipper develops a taste for manly appetites; two reckless co-eds find life a gas; a Texan's alluring wife gives him an itchy surprise; a sword swallower ends up choking on his own act; and a sex addict decides to go organic. Ways to Die: "Habeas Corpse" (#64), "Chippin' Dale" (#288), "Gasketballed" (#226), "Me So Hornet" (#199), "Dumbrella" (#952), "Killdo" (#674), "S*** Dead" (#743) Way to Live: Motorcycle Racer Ron Cook
5	5	"Dead and Deader"	February 15, 2009
A junkie addicted to pain; a man who prefers women to toilets; a gun lover who learns the hard way; a drinker who lets the liquor hit his liver; a javelin enthusiast who gets skewered; and a man who gets rubbered out. Ways to Die: "Wel-dead" (#504), "Trailer Trashed" (#230), "Nite Capped" (#171), "Sh*t Faced" (#385), "Dead Eye" (#197), "Domin-a-dead" (#319), "My Will be done-immediately!" (#93) Way to Live: Tourist Hugh Alexander
6	6	"Death Gets Busy"	February 22, 2009
A man with anger issues meets his end after falling into a vat of acid while attacking his former boss; a bulimic supermodel dies following an uncontrollable binge; and a pornography addict is impaled when an overinflated tire explodes. Ways to Die: "Deep Fried" (#610), "Gorgeous Gorge" (#892), "Re-Tired" (#347), "Botoxicated" (#652), "Choke-A-Lot" (#498), "Sex Ray" (#629), "Last Strike" (#200) Way to Live: Stock Car Racer Mike Easley
7	7	"The Lighter Side of Death"	March 1, 2009
A farmhand lands in trouble with the farmer's daughter; raw snails serve up a nasty surprise; and a magician finally bites the bullet. Ways to Die: "Dung For" (#314), "Brain Worms" (#622), "Abracadaver" (#401), "Weed Whacked" (#429), "Rebel Without A Pulse" (#221), "Kill Basa" (#510), "Wanted Instead" (#364) Way to Live: Drag Boat Racer Sunny Moon
8	8	"The Good, The Bad, and the Dead"	March 8, 2009
A paranoid survivalist crosses paths with a snake; a shoplifter dives into a dumpster and ends up getting trashed; and a cute girl catches a big one - right down her throat. Ways to Die: "Face Offed" (#770), "Re-Coiled" (#47), "Sucked Offed" (#301), "Re-Formed" (#312), "Fin-ished" (#963), "Butt Plugged" (#553), "Found D-eat" (#256) Way to Live: Aviation Boatswain Mate J.D. Bridges
9	9	"Death Be Not Stupid"	March 15, 2009
A biker downs gasoline; a couple meet their end after making love; a narcoleptic dozes off on the job; a woman's tapeworm diet eats her alive; paintball pranksters meet a fatal blow; and an anxious electrician tries fishing with electricity, and gets the shock of his life. Ways to Die: "Gas-Hole" (#502), "Ichiboned" (#1), "Jake N' Baked" (#518), "Die It" (#734), "Pained Gun" (#499), "Deadliest Catch" (#283), "Great Hanged" (#434) Way to Live: Plane Crash Survivors including Franklin Huddle and his wife
10	10	"Cure for the Common Death, Part I"	March 22, 2009
A redneck meets a fatal end while celebrating the Fourth of July; a man with a taste for metal takes his cravings too far; a pair of heavy metal fans learn the deadly side of headbanging; radium-painted workers glow for fun; two metal fans snort fire ants; and a diver who survives a tank failure is blown apart. Ways to Die: "Red, White and Blew" (#77), "Bank Ruptured" (#756), "Guitar Zeros" (#66), "Radium Girls" (#196), "Oz Holed" (#638), "Tanked Girl" (#710), "Law and OrDead" (#909) Way to Live: Skydiver Chris Colwell
11	11	"Death: A User's Manual"	March 29, 2009
An overeater goes belly up; a bodybuilder juiced and loses; a young woman texts herself - to death; a golfer has a 'rough' round; a car thief gets left hanging; and a drunk clown pops his own balloon. Ways to Die: "Gut Busted" (#117), "DestRoid" (#417), "Text Dead" (#78), "Pissed Off" (#210), "Car Jacked" (#222), "Blown Job" (#201), "Paintful Death" (#192) Way to Live: Producer/Actor Sergio Mayer
12	12	"I See Dead People (And They're Cracking Me Up)"	April 5, 2009
A fatal colonic; a delayed death; and a hot dog thief meets his end. Ways to Die: "Water Logged" (#447), "Funny Boned" (#302), "Bowed Out" (#72), "You're So Vein" (#277), "Doggie Style" (#85), "Heart On" (#403) Way to Live: Snake Handler David Weathers/Reporter Shannon Sohn

=== Season 2 (2009–10) ===
No. overall	No. in season	Title	Original release date
13	1	"Death on Arrival"	December 7, 2009
A woman's breast implants explode mid-flight; and marijuana and a forklift end a young man's life. Ways to Die: "Titty Titty Bang Bang" (#948), "Forked-Up" (#714), "UninTented" (#590), "Tali-Bombed" (#123), "Vike-O-Done" (#515), "Deadliest Munch" (#444), "Dead Meat-eorite" (#913), "Bubbled Out" (#68)
14	2	"Death Bites!"	December 9, 2009
A chubby chaser lands big; a frat boy suffers frat burn; a fiddler hits a sour note; an ex-con gets exterminated; a French maid dusts her boss; mobsters lose face; and a limp lover goes down hard. Ways to Die: "Ass Phyxiated" (#451), "Work of Fart" (#103), "Crash-endo" (#76), "Vermin-ated" (#505), "French Fried" (#105), "Bomb-bino" (#803), "Die-agra" (#186)
15	3	"Up With Death"	December 16, 2009
A hot nurse strips down; two trippers get needled; a biker chick goes down; a necrophiliac gets a final nail; a holdup ends in a mix-up; a hockey fight turns bloody; and a raccoon lover gets smitten and bitten. Ways to Die: "M-R-Ouch!" (#485), "Succu Offed" (#229), "Coming & Going" (#432), "Coffin Nailed" (#150), "Greased Is The Word" (#89), "Blades of Gory" (#110), "Boris Bititoff" (#611), "Laced Up" (#162)
16	4	"Putting a Happy Face on Death"	December 30, 2009
A thief hides in a car wash with deadly consequences; and a man cheating at a cockfight is killed by his own rooster. Ways to Die: "Rub-A-Dubbed Out" (#712), "Cock-A-Doodle-Die" (#616), "Chucked Up" (#534), "Little Person Big Death" (#332), "Booby-Zapped" (#254), "ReToaded" (#234), "Vegged Out" (#114), "Die Laughing" (#195)
17	5	"Bringing in the Dead"	January 6, 2010
A rapist makes a fatal mistake on a cross-dressing boxer; and hula and belly dancing turn deadly. Ways to Die: "D. U. Die" (#528), "Belly'd Up" (#146), "Suck Her Punched" (#217), "Jack 'n Croaked" (#177), "Dead Heat" (#657), "Poi Vey" (#96), "ReTired" (#412), "Cleane-Dead Solution" (#308)
18	6	"Gratefully Dead"	January 13, 2010
An anal compulsive turns repulsive; a purse snatcher takes a tumble; a weightlifter loses his grip; a young goth gets exorcised; a smoker gets smoked; two dopes do themselves (in); and a cow lover gets milked. Ways to Die: "Mercury in Uranus" (#599), "A Turn For The Purse" (#297), "Dead Weight" (#102), "Cult Evaded" (#310), "Smoke-A-Doped" (#463), "Two Stoopid" (#655), "Cream-ated" (#204), "Rolled Death" (#313)
19	7	"Come On, Get Deathy"	January 20, 2010
A bliss seeker gets tanked; a little person swallows a harp; a mean hubby goes over the edge; a guitarist gets unplugged; a foolhardy thief breaks his numb-skull; a gold digger digs her own grave; and a spurned lover gets trashed. Ways to Die: "Tanks for Nothing" (#113), "The Chokes On You" (#322), "Back Broke Mountain" (#111), "Grateful Bed" (#120), "Fore Head" (#479), "Booty Trapped" (#333), "S**t Canned" (#412), "Last Blast" (#983)
20	8	"Death Watch"	January 27, 2010
Hot cheerleaders get buzzed; a B-52 goes down in flames; a speed freak blows his mind; a cat hater gets his head handed to him; a health nut gets ratted out; and a golfing couple suffers some bad fore play. Ways to Die: "Washed and Fried" (#238), "Bad Hair Day" (#300), "Micro-Whacked" (#539), "Pussy Whipped" (#88), "Blend-Dead" (#457), "Shanks for the Memories" (#116), "Snake du Jour" (#142), "Dumb Skull" (#292)
21	9	"Waking Up Dead"	February 3, 2010
An acupuncture patient misses the point; a construction worker takes a deadly bathroom break; a stowaway gets his ass-sets frozen; a nagging housewife blows her own fuse; and a cheating gambler gets squeezed. Ways to Die: "Phone Boned" (#662), "Toilet Rolled" (#521), "Mile Die Club" (#559), "Bitch Zapped" (#140), "Texas Fold 'Em" (#311), "Written Offed" (#168), "Ball 'n Pain" (#817), "Last Beer-Dead" (#442)
22	10	"You're Dead! LOL!"	February 10, 2010
The Samurai Death Squad loses a member; a moron gets smoked by cigarettes; a remote glider backfires; a rejected boyfriend faces rejection; a dog walker gets hounded to death; and a biker sparks a riot. Ways to Die: "Samurai Death Squad" (#198), "Shafted" (#856), "Smoked" (#343), "Just Plane Dead" (#413), "Exhaustdead" (#108), "Ruffed Up" (#227), "Lady & The Trampled" (#115), "Stone Hard" (#586)
23	11	"Dead to Rights"	February 17, 2010
A man with anger issues dies three ways at once; and death results when a teen purse snatcher meets an elderly taekwondo master. Ways to Die: "Blown Job" (#118), "Anger Damagement" (#355), "Wrin-killed" (#235), "Huffington Toast" (#98), "Hydro-Co-Done" (#157), "Samu-Fry" (#218), "Screwged" (#236), "Safecracked Pitch" (#214)
24	12	"Dead on Dead"	February 24, 2010
Two drug smugglers get in hot water in the South Pacific; and the CIA zaps a terrorist with a gamma ray gun. Ways to Die: "Weenie Roast" (#101), "Reef Stew" (#202), "Fiddle Licked" (#889), "Snakey Breaky Neck" (#224), "Beer Bashed" (#540), "Bad Assid" (#321), "Tree Mugger" (#176), "Dead Me Stallion" (#568)

=== Season 3 (2010–12) ===
No. overall	No. in season	Title	Original release date
25	1	"Death on a Stick"	August 3, 2010
A peeper takes a bath; a pool hopper goes belly-up; three soldiers get blown up; a gigolo gums up; a bachelorette takes a mouthful; a monk tangles with a donkey; and a boy band hits rock bottom. Ways to Die: "Blood Bath & Beyond" (#354), "Easy Slider" (#418), "Mine Over Splatter" (#337), "Gum's The Word" (#261), "Bird Brained" (#378), "Inquisi-Torn" (#919), "Boys 2 Dead" (#87)
26	2	"Putting A Smiley Face On Death"	September 14, 2010
A liposuction among friends goes wrong; a crude boss takes a leak and bleeds out; a proctologist gets rear-ended; a line-crossing Viking gets split open; a waiter makes a fatal mistake; a woman grabs attention, but bolts too fast; and a hippie gets road killed. Ways to Die: "Fat-ality" (#400), "Catch & Decease" (#608), "Gas Holed" (#278), "Back Stabbed" (#869), "USSR-Dead" (#617), "Cardiac-A-Breast" (#55), "Road Killed" (#303)
27	3	"Stupid is as Stupid Dies"	September 21, 2010
A meth maker loses face; a nudist follows a deadly diet; a sorority girl swallows too much; a survivalist gets the hook; a spider topples a stud; a half-naked football fan gets freeze-framed; and two thrill-seekers lose their heads over piercings. Ways to Die: "Jaw Boned" (#444), "Hair Today, Dead Tomorrow" (#412), "Mudder Sucked" (#620), "Offed The Hook" (#223), "Erecto-phobia" (#672), "Fansicle" (#299), "Tongue Tied" (#517)
28	4	"Dead Wrongs"	September 28, 2010
Two con men get blown away; a sushi chef becomes the butt of the joke; and porn addiction turns deadly. Ways to Die: "Pam Caked!" (#179), "Bibli-killed" (#124), "Eel Effects" (#779), "Glow Job" (#207), "D-parted" (#557), "Pornicated" (#746), "Hard Balled" (#156)
29	5	"Fatal Distractions"	October 5, 2010
A drug runner gets a heads up; two stoners get bonged; a glutton goes belly up; a man-baby gets timed out; a nature hater gets turtle waxed; a woman gets down and dirty; and a man-hater gets feminated. Ways to Die: "Golden Die-angle" (#507), "Clay Achin'" (#243), "Death of Sum Young Guy" (#159), "Crib Your Enthusiasm" (#239), "Turtle Waxed" (#929), "Potty Mouth" (#282), "Die-brator" (#342)
30	6	"The End is Weird"	October 19, 2010
A robot maker meets his maker; an exhibitionist goes down in public; Houdini's final escape; a vomit lover gets chunked; a prankster gets pranked; a B-baller finds only death; and a Hollywood star gets drained. Ways to Die: "Bot-ily Harm" (#723), "Hertz So Good" (#121), "Harry He-Done-y" (#14), "Vom-ate-dead" (#323), "Die-drant" (#506), "Hang Dunked" (#284), "Bad Max" (#873)
31	7	"Hurry Up and Die"	October 26, 2010
An organ donor loses a heart; someone gets swept away; trailer trashed; nymphos run wild; a wrestler hits the mat; a mailman goes postal; and a rocker gets high. Ways to Die: "Drunk Die-er" (#957), "Jersey Gore" (#523), "Cast Offed" (#132), "Lesboned" (#412), "Tapped Out" (#597), "Mail Order Fried" (#284), "Fecal Attraction" (#330)
32	8	"Death Puts on a Dunce Cap"	November 2, 2010
Eating a live octopus; multiple orgasms; a hunter becomes the hunted; a soccer fan gets blown away; a beauty loses her face; and drug addicts get their heads cracked. Ways to Die: "Tenta-killed" (#959), "Orspasm" (#268), "Furdered" (#61), "Vuvu... whatever, he's dead." (#398), "Injecti-cide" (#930), "Scratch n' Snuffed" (#220), "Implo-dead" (#503)
33	9	"Young, Dumb and Full of Death"	November 9, 2010
A salesman sells out; a cokehead gets nosed out; a phony preacher sees the light; a peeper gets hammered; a skateboarder face-plants; a corporate trainer takes a fall; and a dummy gets offed in the woods. Ways to Die: "Onesie & Donesie" (#396), "Hillary Snuffed" (#203), "Cruci-fried" (#704), "Hammer Head" (#742), "Board Stiff" (#478), "Sumowed" (#47), "Bush Whacked" (#345)
34	10	"Today's Menu: Deep Fried Death"	December 8, 2010
Death in the '70s; a thief bites his tongue; a groupie falls for a snake; a juicer gets juiced; Typhoid Mary goes down; a mean girl gets a chubby bunny; and a biker craps out. Ways to Die: "Lawn of the Dead" (#129), "Tongue Died" (#438), "Tube Snaked" (#119), "R.I.P.-PED" (#673), "Mary-nated" (#145), "Gooed Riddance" (#802), "De-throned" (#259)
35	11	"Cure for the Common Death, Part II"	December 15, 2010
A low rider is crushed; a dummy meets nunchucks; Bigfoot gets the boot; a bikini girl swallows trouble; and a jockey gets tossed. Ways to Die: "Hydrau-licked" (#414), "Nun F***ed" (#188), "Myth Busted" (#158), "Radioactivate-dead" (#304), "Jelly Belly-ed" (#389), "Die-arrhea" (#276), "Balloon-a-tic" (#122)
36	12	"Sudden Death"	December 22, 2010
A Japanese rocker dies onstage; prison escape blows up; a scorned roommate gets revenge; a vain dancer bites the dust; clueless terrorists melt down; a foolish hard hat falls; and a tall man squeezed out in Medieval England. Ways to Die: "Coffin to Death" (#435), "Poker Face" (#194), "Bed Buggered" (#415), "Corset Killed Him" (#578), "Gone Fission" (#692), "Falling Down On The Job" (#63), "Ex-Squeezed" (#888)
37	13	"Dying to Tell the Story"	December 29, 2010
A couple gets antsy on safari; a braggart's new truck turns on him; a surfer is board to death; and a chess master meets his match. Ways to Die: "African't" (#794), "Amish-tinguished" (#645), "Trucked Up" (#416), "Handi-crapped" (#212), "Chess Pain" (#169), "Little Chop of Horrors" (#315), "'Dis Still Killed 'Em" (#452)
38	14	"If You're Dead - Leave a Message and We'll Get Back to You"	January 5, 2011
A hat maker doesn't make it; a tech geek gets uninstalled; a wannabe hip-hop queen gets butted out; a carjacker gets jacked off; a pretend gangbanger gets body-slammed; a scam artist's plan gets crushed; and an agro dad gets blanked. Ways to Die: "Hats All Folks!" (#501), "Tone Death" (#937), "Caulk Blocked" (#877), "Deaf Jammed" (#130), "Homie-cide" (#448), "OMG! SUV! R.I.P." (#320), "Dead-dy Dearest" (#172)
39	15	"The One About Dumb People Dying"	February 8, 2011
A crossdresser "wets" the bed; a gymnast makes a killer move; a greedy crematorium worker explodes; a man drinking liquid cocaine gets a deadly kick; a stewardess is in over her head; a taxidermist gets squirrely; and a pumpkin thief takes theft to the heart. Ways to Die: "Wet Dream" (#331), "Mary Lou Rectum" (#755), "Kung Pao Pow!!!" (#365), "Hot Shot Part D'uh" (#513), "Steward-death" (#701), "Squirreled Away" (#274), "Fatally Gourd" (#870)
40	16	"Getting a Rise from the Dead"	February 16, 2011
A sign spinner spins out; a recipe thief gets her goose cooked; cloud seeding turns rocky; a tobacco chewer gets chewed out; a mob hit goes awry; a corporate spy hits the fan; and a mad scientist gets reanimated. Ways to Die: "Sign Offed" (#298), "Chef Boy-R-Dead" (#512), "Par For The Corpse" (#209), "Dip 'N Die" (#206), "Dead Fella" (#178), "Double-O-Severed" (#555), "Snakenstein" (#441)
41	17	"Ready or Not, Here Comes Death"	February 23, 2011
A Japanese game show contestant gets deep-sixed; a free runner runs out of time; a mean caretaker gets pickled; a stripper with big boobies meets her end; a softballer busts a gut; a murderer busts out of the nut house; and two hunters get dogged. Ways to Die: "Asphyxi-Asian" (#231), "Par-gore" (#246), "Dill D'oh!" (#149), "Boobicide" (#671), "Boweled Out" (#677), "Goon Interrupted" (#412), "Doggie Styled" (#428)
42	18	"Grave Errors"	March 2, 2011
A hairdresser swallows too many 'leg spreaders'; Katrina looters get a shock; 1920s pipe-hitting homeboys; a fake doctor meets a leper; a mistress loses face; and a cell phone user gets disconnected. Ways to Die: "Curl Up And Die" (#786), "Who Ded?" (#281), "Crack Piped" (#151), "Thanks A Clot" (#753), "Odds Are You're Dead" (#594), "Chemi-killed" (#405), "i-Boned" (#327)
43	19	"Killing Them Softly"	March 9, 2011
An email scammer gets deleted; a hot co-ed flunks out; a grave robber digs his own grave; a warlord snorts crystal death; a couple screws themselves to death mid-air; two losers suck and blow up; and an old Nazi meets an old bullet. Ways to Die: "Scam Eye Am (Dead)" (#894), "Contact Die" (#270), "Six Feet Plunder" (#427), "Guns N' Noses" (#465), "Frequent Dier" (#95), "Suck & Blown" (#180), "Master E-Raced" (#744)
44	20	"Better Them Than Us"	March 16, 2011
A millionaire bottoms out; a Russian pimp struggles; gang bangers play doctor; a pyromaniac gets burned; an ice cream man gets iced; a bad actor loses a hand; and a Greek meets his brass. Ways to Die: "Macdeath" (#615), "Cloudy With A Chance Of Pain" (#368), "Pop Goes The Cholo" (#895), "Flame Retard-ant" (#205), "Rocky Roadkill" (#245), "Straight To DVDead" (#404), "My Big Fat Greek Death" (#348)
45	21	"Dead Before They Know It"	March 23, 2011
Death crashes a terrorist wedding; a big box squashes small heads; a self-blood transfusion goes wrong; a gangster spills his guts; a French killer loses his head; and a very bad Santa gets iced. Ways to Die: "SP-Effed" (#317), "Ji-Had It Coming" (#127), "Crate and Buried" (#264), "Lost in Transfusion" (#458), "Arriva-deadci" (#678), "Miss-ur Head" (#402), "Eye-Sick-Kill" (#247)
46	22	"Stupid Is as Death Does"	March 29, 2011
A deadbeat dad goes through the roof; a stump lover gets eyeballed; a drinking game turns deadly; a dummy goes from spying to dying; a gamer gets pwned; a mover stops moving; and a poser artist explodes onto the scene. Ways to Die: "Chairway To Heaven" (#219), "Eye Swallow" (#623), "The Depart-dead" (#255), "Spyanide" (#621), "Game Stopped" (#126), "Moving Violation" (#305), "Art Attack" (#193)
47	23	"That's "Mister Death" to You"	July 11, 2011
A jersey chaser gets plugged; OCD stands for "of course (you're) dead"; a terrorist eats himself to death; an animal abuser gets dog-boned; a massage parlor patron meets an unhappy end; two inmates lynch themselves; and a bank robber loses his head. Ways to Die: "Any Given Gunday" (#275), "Descent of a Woman" (#592), "Scarf-face" (#646), "Dog Dead Afternoon" (#174), "Crappy Ending" (#213), "Chain Gang Banged" (#439), "Withdrawn" (#715)
48	24	"Death, the New Black"	July 18, 2011
A disco king hits the floor; a sauna contest goes gaseous; an upskirting perv gets busted; a meathead blows himself (up); a pot farmer gets munchied; a football coach splits his uprights; and a drunk heckler gets fleshed out. Ways to Die: "Splat-formed" (#147), "Who Fart-dead?" (#325), "Him-paled" (#237), "Jablowni" (#309), "Ass-hoppered" (#213), "Ball Sacked" (#497), "Big Boned" (#306)
49	25	"Death Be a Lady Tonight"	July 25, 2011
An annoying guy gets cut down; a stalker gets smoked out; a football fanatic goes down in a barfight; a drug addict gets crushed; and a tomb raider goes batty. Ways to Die: "Half-Offed" (#745), "Smoke Stalked" (#459), "Sudden Death" (#619), "Raider of the Lost Narc" (#271), "Bats All Folks" (#324), "Pimp My Death" (#257), "Drone Boned" (#370)
50	26	"Today's Special: Death"	August 1, 2011
A hot welder goes down on the job; an unfaithful wife can't cheat death; a '20s gangster gets steamed; and a mother-in-law from hell goes back. Ways to Die: "Weld Done" (#406), "That's A Morte!" (#450), "Gang Banged" (#412), "Smother-In-Law" (#326), "DWI: Dying While Intoxicated" (#618), "Vertigo, Going, Gone" (#73), "Tea Bagged" (#440)
51	27	"Eat, Pray, Die"	August 8, 2011
A medieval German gets stoned; a bachelor gets butted out; a con man guru flames out; a dog hater gets boned; and a juvenile delinquent hates Farmville. Ways to Die: "Ich Bin Ein Stoner" (#500), "Another Up The Butt Story" (#449), "Poly-Ass-Turd" (#189), "Shoots & Ladders" (#79), "E-I-E-I-Oww!" (#487), "Bush Defeated" (#769), "Skid Marked" (#419)
52	28	"Wait, Don't Tell Me? You're Dead!"	August 15, 2011
A neo-Nazi opens a can of whoop-ass; a prankster's joke backfires; a voyeur gets fooled; a stalker gets shafted; and an epileptic stripper goes lights out. Ways to Die: "Fire In The Hole" (#804), "Somewhere Over The Railing" (#65), "Muffed Dive" (#329), "Treadkill" (#328), "Bush Whacked 2: South of the Border" (#86), "Leave It To Seizure" (#173), "Dia de Los Morons" (#318)
53	29	"Death – The Gift That Lasts Forever"	August 22, 2011
A cheatin' hubby gets eaten by a bear; an old pervert sex-plodes; a bride goes down at the altar; a package thief meets an anthrax surprise; an insomniac hits and runs; a bearded hipster drowns; and a drunk worker's pants explode. Ways to Die: "Trip to the Maul" (#591), "Gory Holed" (#826), "Died-Zilla" (#468), "U.P.F'D." (#334), "I'll Sleep When I'm Dead" (#992), "Kitchen Sunk" (#325), "Blast Call" (#460)
54	30	"Death: One Size Fits All"	August 29, 2011
A fake handicapped man gets his comeuppance; a con man is frozen; a female wrestler goes down; a driving teacher loses control; and a mine foreman explodes. Ways to Die: "Handi-crapped" (#190), "Frost-dead" (#293), "Slippery When Dead" (#242), "Drivers Dead" (#163), "Slayer Cake" (#881), "Miner Injuries" (#240), "My Chemical Romance" (#785)
55	31	"Death by Request" "The Deathies"	October 24, 2011
1000 Ways to Die presents a new award show... "The Deathies", featuring selected deaths: Sexiest Death: "Washed and Fried" (Winner); "Blood Bath & Beyond" (Runner-Up A); "Gum's The Word" (Runner-Up B); Historical Death: "Back Stabbed" (Winner); "Vike-O-Done" (Runner-Up A); "My Big Fat Greek Death" (Runner-Up B); Death During Sex: "Ass Phyxiated" (Winner); "Gasketballed" (Runner-Up A); "Orspasm" (Runner-Up B); Cosmic Karma: "Steward-death" (Winner); "Dead Meat-eorite" (Runner-Up A); "Road Killed" (Runner-Up B); Worst Pervert: "Vom-ate-dead" (Winner); "Crib Your Enthusiasm" (Runner-Up A); "Mercury in Uranus" (Runner-Up B); Sports Death: "Dead Eye" (Winner); "Samurai Death Squad" (Runner-Up A); "Pam Caked!" (Runner-Up B); Dumbest Druggie: "Em-Bear-Assed" (Winner); "Curl Up And Die" (Runner-Up A); "Fecal Attraction" (Runner-Up B); Dumbest Death: "Boys 2 Dead" (Winner); "Bitch Zapped" (Runner-Up A); "Midnight Choker" (Runner-Up B); Most Painful Death: "Bad Max" (Winner); "Easy Slider" (Runner-Up A); "Bot-ily Harm" (Runner-Up B); Deathiest Death: "Titty Titty Bang Bang" (Winner); "Fat-ality" (Runner-Up A); "Chippin' Dale" (Runner-Up B)
56	32	"Deadliest Kitsch"	October 24, 2011
A dictator gets stuck; a security guard gets hosed; a cyclist runs out of breath; a rock climber falls; and a circus clown meets an insane posse. Ways to Die: "Bull-heavia" (#642), "Hose Whipped" (#241), "Suffer-cated" (#820), "Rocked Out" (#307), "Chicken Boned" (#917), "Toe Jammed" (#508), "Down With The Clown" (#260)
57	33	"Grave Decisions" "The Halloween Episode"	October 31, 2011
A politico has a sneezing fit; a gun-toting senior blows up; a road-rage woman takes one in the gut; a convict meets a shocking end; a dirty biker gets their due; and a camper boils over with love. Ways to Die: "Sneeze Bag" (#819), "As-Capped" (#273), "Cat Fight On A Hot Tin Hood" (#295), "Heart Beat Down" (#109), "Chain On You" (#244), "This Just In... My Chest" (#700), "Therm-assed" (#548)
58	34	"Dirt Nap"	November 7, 2011
A bank robber sticks his neck out; a redhead gets taken down; a tough teen meets a mailbox; a shyster shopper takes a dip; a fat man loses face; a crazy ex gets ex'd; and a farting contest turns fatal. Ways to Die: "Harmored Car" (#350), "Bush Whacked 3: Waxed Off" (#915), "You've Got Dead Male" (#294), "Shop 'Till You Drown" (#634), "De-faced" (#290), "Ex'd Ex" (#630), "Colon-gross-opy" (#730)
59	35	"Death Takes a Vacation"	November 14, 2011
A bouncer gets beamed; a Japanese rockstar sparks suicide; a food vendor gets deep fried; a chemical owner tries to stop a leak; a drug smuggler meets a lethal tie-dye; a mime gets pickled; and a tennis girl hits her target. Ways to Die: "Velvet Dope" (#272), "Bull-shido" (#965), "Batter Upped" (#899), "Caught in a Lye" (#771), "Dead On Arrival" (#614), "Dead Mime ☺︎" (#211), "Her Own Damn Fault!!!" (#556)
60	36	"Wild Wild Death"	November 21, 2011
A bank robber fails badly; a fake superhero falls; a guy dies chasing views; a supervisor's date goes wrong; an art thief gets glassed; a paramedic gets high - and shocks himself dead; and a sex blogger hickeys herself to a stroke. Ways to Die: "Teller She's Dead" (#644), "Super Zero" (#106), "Branched Out" (#520), "Dough!!!" (#726), "Cham-pained" (#593), "Backseat Die-er" (#105), "Blogged Artery" (#443)
61	37	"Death Penalties"	January 25, 2012
A wedding singer gets choked up; a French maid trapped in an iron maiden; a chef loses face; and a muscle woman meets her maker. Ways to Die: "Recep-shunned" (#496), "Dyin' Maiden" (#874), "Teri-yucky" (#358), "No Guts... All Gory" (#950), "She-Manned" (#24), "Apocalypse Harley" (#445)
62	38	"Die-abetic"	February 1, 2012
A lady puckers up one last time; a tow truck driver becomes a head banger; a waitress gets a bad tip; a food critic misses the point; a turkey meets a turkey; a neck massager takes a woman's breath away; and a dancer loses heart. Ways to Die: "Spit-ill" (#215), "Tow F.U." (#462), "Tipping Point" (#296), "Dead Fixe" (#554), "Dead Necked" (#280), "Strang-girled" (#366), "Pop and Lox" (#94)
63	39	"Star Death: The Last Generation"	February 8, 2012
A cat lady's love goes too fur; a burglar falls for his victim; a mob boss gets the finger; a nasty supermodel meets a dead eye; a customer is left breathless by great savings; a perfectionist overhydrates; and a man rolls over the point. Ways to Die: "Cat Got Your Life" (#453), "~~Homie Invasion~~ Homie's Dead" (#182), "Kara-chokey" (#446), "Photo-dead-ick" (#152), "Paper or Spastic" (#330), "Hydrate-dead" (#529), "Nine Inch Nailed" (#232)
64	40	"Death: Putting the "Fun" in "Funeral""	February 22, 2012
Trainer and barbells collide; a polygamist falls into his own trap; a couple wine and die; and a ticket scalper meets a red light. Ways to Die: "Spastic Surgery" (#711), "Rhymes with "Rich"" (#191), "Less Is Mormon" (#258), "Wine and Die" (#689), "Die-rect TV" (#420), "Dead Light Green Light" (#944), "Extinguished" (#346)
65	41	"Sor-Dead Affair"	February 29, 2012
A man gets frisky with a statue; a rioter gets the wind knocked out; a sleepwalker goes for a swim; and a man dies with a happy ending. Ways to Die: "Penis de Milo" (#911), "Bad Laps" (#143), "Pris-un-done" (#181), "Xmas-turbator" (#225), "Polly Want To Crack Your Spine?" (#571), "Dead Sleep (Walk)" (#393), "Premature Endings" (#1000)
66	42	"Locked and Low Dead"	February 29, 2012
Socialite goes green; a short-fused man finally blows; a woman high-jumps to her death; a crooked cop reeks of decay; a wormy scam artist; a trippy trip to the market; and a bumbling mad scientist gets burned. Ways to Die: "Gone Green" (#612), "Dead Kacynski" (#374), "Die Jump" (#228), "Cop Out" (#107), "Lazy Bumday" (#914), "White Wetting" (#246), "Sun Burnt" (#631)

=== Season 4 (2012) ===
No. overall	No. in season	Title	Original release date
67	1	"Enter the Ferret"	March 12, 2012
A ferret goes up the eerie canal; a fat man squeezes into a baby swing; a female boxer goes down; a stoner gets launched; a bad man takes an acid bath; a food fight turns deadly; and a tattoo artist swallows a chain. Ways to Die: "Critter in the S****er" (#780), "Fat Man in a Little Swing" (#141), "TK Uh-O" (#128), "Out To Launch" (#216), "Vat's All Folks" (#613), "Tunnel Vision" (#99), "A Chainus Runs Through It" (#985)
68	2	"Think Globally, Die Locally"	March 19, 2012
A Chinese rapper gets grilled; a mini-golfer maxes out; a super lotto winner goes super nuts; a yoga teacher is a real gas; a hipster goes down in slo-mo; a hacker gets hacked; and a warden can't lock it down. Ways to Die: "Grilled" (#407), "Hole 'n Done" (#279), "Cross Bown'd" (#144), "Namas-dead" (#183), "Bowled Over" (#355), "Hacked Off" (#371), "War-done" (#253)
69	3	"Tweets From the Dead"	March 26, 2012
An exterminator gets exterminated; a stockbroker turns magnetic in the stomach; a wedding crasher crashes through the glass; a thief meets a meathook; a black marketeer gets blown up; a hijacker is exploded by a semi; and a ghost buster gets busted. Ways to Die: "Pretty Fly for a Dead Guy" (#680), "Bucky Boned" (#397), "Wedding Crasher" (#595), "Meat Your Maker" (#372), "Well Chung" (#252), "Hi-Jack Offed" (#754), "Ghost Busted" (#134)
70	4	"A New App Called Death"	April 2, 2012
A sexy copier mishap; a scavenger loses his head; a bicycle hater gets hit; milking a pig; a winded diva; and a motel inspector stirs the dead. Ways to Die: "Electro-cutie" (#349), "WW1 and Done" (#184), "F.U.v'd" (#248), "Pulled Pork" (#351), "The Day the Magic Died" (#336), "American Died'ol" (#897), "Mastur-bitten" (#250)
71	5	"Death Certificates"	July 15, 2012
A fitness instructor gets bounced; a bird smuggler catches the flu; coke mules get branded; a couple takes a hit; a computer thief crashes and burns; a moonshiner gets poked; and a director makes a scene. Ways to Die: "Heim-licked" (#514), "This Bird Has Flu" (#265), "Keester Sunday" (#360), "Kill Bill & Billie" (#249), "I Spy A Dead Guy" (#519), "Eye So Horny" (#187), "North by Northwasted" (#411)
72	6	"Crying Over Spilled Blood"	July 15, 2012
A tennis brat gets the shaft; a sadistic loan officer; a dead-eye sniper; ghost peppers; a deadly infomercial; a jailbreak gone wrong; and a caveman discovers fire. Ways to Die: "Ten-Ass Anyone?" (#425), "Sky Scraped" (#596), "Rife-Ill" (#153), "Chili Today... Dead Tomorrow" (#233), "Info-pain-ment" (#185), "Mexi-can't" (#477), "Caved In" (#80)
73	7	"It's a Dead, Dead, Dead World"	July 15, 2012
A lazy husband goes on a roll; terrorists get gassed; a germaphobe takes a deadly bath; and death hits the Jersey Shore. Ways to Die: "Signed Out" (#522), "Hummus Among Us" (#267), "Tread Marked" (#160), "Piss Offed" (#90), "Waste Dead" (#135), "Rubbed Out" (#431), "Killer Tan" (#263)
74	8	"Death, The Final Frontier"	July 15, 2012
A tease gets stoned; a drunk wife crashes a sobriety party; a filthy husband falls for a chainsaw; a garage sale turns deadly; and a strongman gets weak in the knees. Ways to Die: "Pebble Bitched" (#509), "No Fun-gus" (#661), "Pain Saw" (#161), "Ring-A-Ding Dead" (#408), "Ass-plosion" (#830), "Lac-toasted" (#399), "Phlegm Phatale" (#656)

== Reception ==
Melissa Camacho of Common Sense Media criticized the series for its graphic reenactments and its treatment of deaths as entertainment.

== See also ==
- Curious and Unusual Deaths – A similar but close to the same series.
- Lists of unusual deaths – Some of the deaths on these lists served as inspiration for episode segments.
