= Brainchild (TV series) =

American educational streaming television series

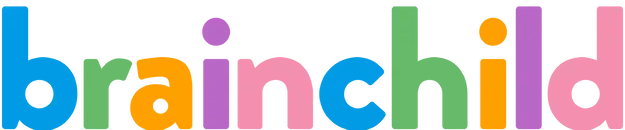
- Genre: Educational; Documentary
- Created by: Adam 'Tex' Davis
- Country of origin: United States
- Original language: English
- No. of seasons: 1
- No. of episodes: 13

Production
- Running time: 30 minutes
- Production companies: Atomic Entertainment; I Am Other

Original release
- Network: Netflix
- Release: November 1, 2018

Brainchild is an American educational television series produced by Pharrell Williams. Its producers previously created National Geographic's Brain Games. The series was released on Netflix on November 1, 2018.

== Premise ==
Brainchild is an educational series targeted toward a young audience that conducts various scientific experiments. Experiment topics include dreams, emotions, superheroes, motivation, the deep sea and gravity.

== Cast ==
- Sahana Srinivasan - Host
- Alie Ward - Science friend
- Gary T. Carlin - Various voices
- Ben Seidman as Himself

== Release ==
The first season was released on November 1, 2018 on Netflix.
