= Sahana Srinivasan =

American comedian, actress, filmmaker

- Born: Dallas, Texas
- Education: University of Texas at Austin

Comedy career
- Medium: Stand-up comedy, television, film
- Subject: Observational comedy

Sahana Srinivasan is an American comedian, actress and filmmaker known for such television series and films as The Pradeeps of Pittsburgh, Brainchild and Space Warriors.

== Life and career ==
Born in Dallas, Texas, the daughter of engineers, Srinivasan is a film graduate of the University of Texas at Austin. Srinivasan was named one of Time Out magazine's 2020 "10 Comedians To Watch."

Srinivasan is queer.
