= Bob Arno =

Swedish-American entertainer

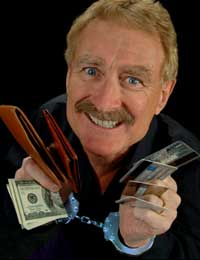
Bob Arno, handcuffed, with cash, wallets, and credit cards

Bob Arno (born 1940) is a Swedish-American entertainer, known primarily as a comedy pickpocket, and more recently criminologist specializing in global street crime. He grew up in Stockholm, Sweden, and became a US citizen in 1992.

== Career ==
Arno's stage pickpocket performance is billed as comedy, though it includes some non-comedic elements which, nevertheless, fascinate and impress audience members. First among these is his incorporation of documentary-style video which is projected during his presentation. As described in a March 9, 2004 article in The New York Times, the video is footage shot by himself and his wife, Bambi Vincent, of criminal pickpockets and other street thieves before, during, and after committing their crimes. This "reality factor" contributes greatly to the presentation's originality and adds elements of awe and enlightenment that give it depth beyond comedy.

Unlike most other stage pickpocketers, Arno does not present magical effects for their own sake. His style includes incorporating principles of magic in a similar fashion to criminal pickpockets, con artists, and other street thieves. And, given that his show is comedy, he will at times prepare a volunteer to enhance the often humorous finales of his shows. Arno's stage pickpocketings include neckties, suspenders, glasses, belts, cell phones, wallets, and pocket contents, as well as watches.

== Criminology ==
In 1993, looking to expand the show, Arno and his wife, Bambi Vincent, challenged themselves to bring elements from the street to the stage. They began a serious study of street criminals, filming them in the act of tricking and/or stealing from victims, and interviewing them when possible. "Wearing hidden camera and recording equipment, they do everything they can to put themselves in the thick of the action," according to Las Vegas Review Journal. Arno and Vincent began calling themselves "thiefhunters" and soon amassed a valuable film archive of a (then) little-documented crime.

In the preface of their book (see below), Arno and Vincent claim to have initially suffered inner turmoil created by failing to prevent incidents occurring in their presence, but they overcame that discomfort after realizing the value of their study. Certainly they were able to port street techniques to the stage, as originally intended. But the video footage and interviews garnered interest from law enforcement and security agencies, while the video mixed with anecdotes and lessons became a popular lecture to laymen.

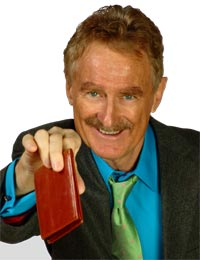
Bob Arno

Thus began Arno's career as a criminologist and speaker. His study had begun much earlier with observations of soldiers on R&R leave in Asia during the 1960s. On May 11, 1969, a front page profile written by Brian Moynahan in the London Sunday Times called Arno "one of the world's pickpocketing experts." In the four-column article Arno describes theft risks peculiar to various Asian countries and compares victim reaction by nationality. In its June 20, 1969 issue, Time magazine wrote: "One of the world's foremost experts in the techniques of first-rank 'wires' (or 'cannons' or 'pit workers') is Bob Arno, a 29-year-old Swede whose demonstrations onstage and in nightclubs earn him more than $100,000 a year." In a January 9, 1981 article entitled "Beware the Stiff-Armed Stranger; He May be Lifting Your Wallet," The Wall Street Journal quoted "Robert [sic] Arno, a Miami, Fla., pickpocketing expert who's advised police in various countries."

In 1993, with video cameras to document his findings, Arno revived his research in earnest. His knowledge base started with common and specialized forms of street thievery, and later grew to include off-the-street theft from tourists. His expertise now includes behavior profiling, identity theft, laptop theft, credit card fraud and internet scams. He lectures to corporate and lay audiences and presents training workshops for law enforcement and security, and other government agencies in the United States and abroad. Promenade Speakers Bureau calls Arno's presentations "a tad provocative," and says they include "pattern recognition" and "body language profiling."

In December 2015 he was invited to speak at Europol's International Pickpocketing Gangs Conference in The Hague. Arno "was invited as a guest speaker, presenting pickpocket techniques as well as an insight in the countermeasures and tactical behavior of the offenders" to law enforcements specialists from across Europe.

With Vincent, Arno is co-author of the book Travel Advisory: How to Avoid Thefts, Cons, and Street Scams (Bonus Books, 2003).

The feature article "Thieves Among Us" in the April 2005 issue of National Geographic Traveler documents several of Arno's "unorthodox surveillance tactics." Arno walked into the picturesque but crime-ridden Spanish Quarter of Naples, Italy, to see how long it would take for his (fake) Rolex to be stolen by scooter-riding bandits. By alleging to be a pickpocket, he establishes a rapport with street thieves, which has resulted in at least one offer to join an organized crime ring at US$1,000/day for himself and Vincent.

== History ==
At age 15, Arno began performing magic at youth centers in his native Sweden and was successful enough to tour the country for several years. He briefly experimented with hypnotism before settling on pickpocketing, having been inspired by french entertainer "Dominique" Risbourg, the reigning pickpocket performer of the time. When Dominique had an extended run in Stockholm in 1956, he solicited the local Magic Circle for an assistant, and Arno volunteered.

On starting his pickpocket career Bob said:

I started out looking for "bad guys" in 1964, Vietnam War. I was a war-photographer. I was 23 years old, I had no idea how to get good pictures. While we were out there [in Vietnam], in the same hotel, a major drug guy happened to live there. This guy, I got friendly with. And that led me to the underworld, to the belly of the beast.

From age 20 to 23, Arno toured Asia with his pickpocket show, working nightclubs and U.S. military bases. From 23 to 25 he toured across Europe working nightclubs and theaters. At 25 he worked for two months at the Latin Quarter (nightclub) in New York City, which began his career in America. He worked steadily from then on, mostly in casino revues, moving from Atlantic City to the Caribbean to Canada to Las Vegas. In 1992, after many years in Las Vegas and three years (1990–1992) in the Jubilee! show at Bally's Casino there, he quit his casino revue career to travel with his wife. Cruise ships served a triple purpose in the 1990s: a steady income as a performing venue; exotic world travel; and putting Arno in the middle of huge tourist crowds, which is generally where pickpockets operate. These crowds, primarily in the great cities of Europe, but also in Asia, Africa, and South America, were the inspiration for Arno's research on criminal pickpocketing. The study soon became the motivation for further cruise ship engagements.

The 1990s also saw Arno in theater productions. He starred in his own show with Swedish comedy magician John Houdi at Berns Salonger in Stockholm, performed at the Lido in Amsterdam, at Liseberg and Gröna Lund in Sweden, at theaters in Sydney, and at Sun City, North West. He also began performing at private corporate events, which is currently his main focus along with keynote speaking and law enforcement training.

In 2008 he toured as part of a stage show called Hoodwinked with Banachek, Todd Robbins and Richard Turner.

He was featured in the Just for Laughs Comedy Tour of 2010, along with Jeremy Hotz, Robert Kelly, Ryan Hamilton, and Gina Yashere.

In 2011, he was featured with Ben Seidman in a series of hidden camera videos directed by Jamie Kennedy and Michael Addis. Using their pickpocketing skills they slipped computers into people's handbags without them knowing. The "I Was Framed" project, gained online popularity and quickly reached over 900,000 views.

In August 2015, he was a featured speaker at DeceptiCon 2015 at University of Cambridge, UK, the International Conference on Deceptive Behavior and deception detection.

In December 2015 he was an invited speaker at Europol's International Pickpocketing Gangs Conference in The Hague, The Netherlands.

== Film ==
The National Geographic documentary film Pickpocket King was shot in Naples, Italy in September 2010, and premiered around the world (region by region) in 2011 and 2012. Conceived and directed by Kun Chang, director, the film follows Arno as he meets and infiltrates the city's most prolific pickpocket gang. Once a relationship is established, the thieves challenge Arno to steal in the real world. [The film can now be seen on YouTube in many languages.]

== Books ==
- Travel Advisory: How to Avoid Thefts, Cons, and Street Scams (Bonus Books, 2003), by Bambi Vincent and Bob Arno. ISBN 1-56625-198-2 Now available as an eBook.
- Scam-Proof Your Life: 377 Smart Ways to Protect You & Your Family from Ripoffs, Bogus Deals & Other Consumer Headaches (Sterling, 2006), by Sid Kirchheimer. (Bob Arno is a contributor) ISBN 1-4027-3041-1

== Television ==
Arno has appeared on numerous television shows in the United States and abroad, both as a performer and as an authority on street crime. Between 1972 and 1975, he had several of his own one-hour specials on TROS television in the Netherlands. On Late Night with David Letterman (December 1983) he stole Letterman's tie and heirloom watch. He was on HBO's Just for Laughs in 1989 and 2009. His 1996 appearance on World's Greatest Magic III revived interest in theatrical pickpocketing. As Arno's study of criminal pickpockets and con artists advanced, he appeared more and more frequently on national and local news shows around the world. Notable were his highly-rated (and repeated) segments on ABC's 20/20 (November 3, 2000, June 22, 2001, July 30, 2004, July 13, 2012, March 23, 2013). In Arno's early appearances on ABC 20/20, he narrated his crime-in-action video and walked the news crews through popular travel destinations where they became the victims of pickpockets and con artists. Those segments launched an entirely new genre in television, in which street thieves were filmed with hidden cameras and then confronted. In the space of three years, Arno made the two early 20/20 broadcasts, and many, many others including:

- ITV London Weekend Television's Beware: Pickpockets, broadcast in June 2000
- ITV London Weekend Television's Beware: Street Thieves, broadcast in July 2001
- The Travel Channel's Las Vegas Caught on Tape, broadcast January 17, 2002
- The Travel Channel's Travel Scams & Rip-offs Revealed, broadcast December 3, 2002
- Court TV's Safety Challenge, broadcast March 13, 2003
- Jimmy Kimmel Live, broadcast June 2, 2003

The "beware of thieves" genre thus became popular. When, for some productions, Bob Arno was unwilling or unable to demonstrate pickpocket techniques and license his crime-in-action video, actors were assembled to dramatize scenarios without his expertise.

With his pickpocket footage, demonstrations, and expertise, Arno also appeared in the BBC's History of Magic (2004), and appeared as "the fastest fingers" on Ripley's Believe it or Not (2003 Episode 4.9). The Travel Channel's endlessly repeated Travel Scams & Rip—offs Revealed-Las Vegas, garnered consistently high ratings. Just for fun, Arno appeared on NBC's "Little Big Shots Forever Young with Steve Harvey", which aired on July 19, 2017 to a rousing standing ovation.

Arno's foreign television credits are many, including appearances in Germany, Sweden, South Africa, Australia, Japan, Singapore, Canada, Slovenia, Brazil, India, United Arab Emirates, and United Kingdom.
