= Ben Seidman =

American entertainer (born 1984)

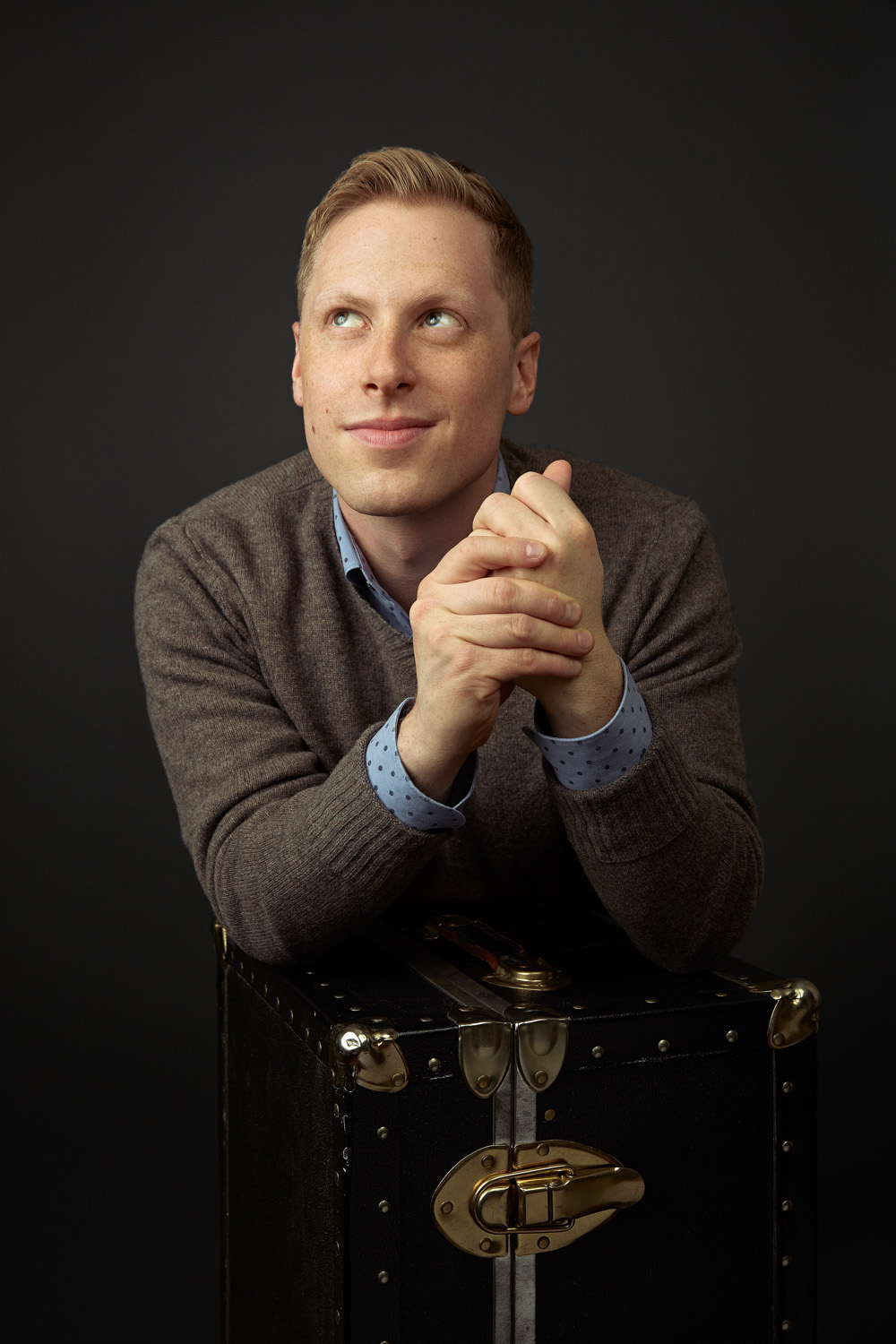
- Seidman in 2014
- Born: 1 December 1984 (age 41); Milwaukee, Wisconsin
- Occupation: Magician
- Website: www.benseidman.com

Ben Seidman (born December 1, 1984) is an American magician who has been described as a "sleight of hand expert" by Vanity Fair.

== Live magic performance ==
Seidman, along with Marcus Monroe and Luke Jermay, founded The Optical Delusions, a 2008 touring show that billed itself as "an evening of new-school variety." Seidman spent the summer of 2011 in Stockholm, Sweden writing and directing Helt Magiskt for the Swedish channel SVT. Helt Magiskt, the Swedish adaptation of the BBC show The Magicians, followed Charlie Caper, winner of Sweden's Got Talent, Michael Halvarson, Star of Cirque du Soleil’s Koozå, and large-scale illusionist Joe Labero, as they performed alongside celebrities. Shortly after, Seidman returned to Stockholm to work with Charlie Caper creating a performance piece using iPads. Seidman has headlined the Atlantis Casino in the Bahamas, performed at The Venetian in Macau, and was featured in a four-month run at Harrah’s Hotel and Casino. Seidman was featured on two national comedy tours produced by Just For Laughs in 2010 and 2013. The 2013 tour spanned 21 cities throughout Canada.

He is currently based in Los Angeles, where he performs at the Magic Castle in Hollywood and The Comedy & Magic Club in Hermosa Beach. Seidman developed a touring live comedy act that involves sleight-of-hand and pickpocketing. In 2019 Seidman began performing a two-person show with Shin Lim, winner of America's Got Talent: The Champions. He has performed a live show called Con Man: A True Crime Magic Show at various theaters across the United States in 2025 and 2026.

Seidman was named entertainer of the year award for Princess Cruises, and the resident magician of Mandalay Bay casino in Las Vegas.

== Film and television ==
In 2011, Seidman starred in a series of hidden camera videos called "I Was Framed", using his pick-pocketing skills to slip computers into people’s handbags without them knowing. It was directed by Jamie Kennedy and Michael Addis, and also featured magician Bob Arno. Seidman has appeared in the Expert Reacts video series from Vanity Fair. He was featured in a 2023 video on the "nine levels of pickpocketing" by Wired.

He was a writer and adviser for three seasons of the A&E program Mindfreak, (2005–2010) starring Criss Angel. Seidman taught Johnny Knoxville magic tricks for the 2013 film Jackass Presents: Bad Grandpa. In 2013, Seidman co-starred in Magic Outlaws on the Travel Channel, which followed magicians on tour. Since 2015, he has appeared twice on Penn & Teller: Fool Us. In 2021, he appeared on the season 9 premiere of Vanderpump Rules. He guest starred on the 2018 Netflix educational show Brainchild. Seidman appeared in the 2025 film Now You See Me: Now You Don't and served as a magic adviser and teacher to the cast.
