= Curious and Unusual Deaths =

Canadian television series, 2009–2012

- Genre: Documentary; Historical; Mystery; Anthology
- Created by: Andrew Kaufman; Marlo Miazga
- Written by: Carl Knutson
- Directed by: David Weaver (season 1); Aaron Woodley (season 2)
- Narrated by: Steve Herringer
- Music by: Greg Johnston
- Country of origin: Canada
- Original language: English
- No. of seasons: 2
- No. of episodes: 19

Production
- Producer: Marlo Miazga
- Production locations: Toronto, Ontario, Canada; Mississauga, Ontario, Canada
- Running time: 30 minutes
- Production companies: Lamport-Sheppard Entertainment; New Road Media (season 2); ROGERS Telefund; Passion Distribution

Original release
- Network: Discovery Channel Canada; Investigation Discovery
- Release: October 31, 2009 – April 27, 2012

Curious and Unusual Deaths is a Canadian historical documentary anthology television series aired on Discovery Channel Canada and Investigation Discovery from October 31, 2009, to April 27, 2012. The show features real cause of strangest deaths based on events and incidents around the world. This show was similar to the American television series 1000 Ways to Die that was premiered on Spike in 2008.

== True events featured ==
- American actor Brandon Lee died on a set of The Crow on March 31, 1993 in Wilmington, North Carolina aged 28 years old. He was posthumously cast when the movie was released in 1994 after his death.
- American dancer and choreographer Isadora Duncan died of strangulation by her scarf on September 14, 1927 in Nice, France.
- American physicist Harry K. Daghlian, Jr. died of radiation poisoning in a critical mass experiment on September 15, 1945 in Los Alamos, New Mexico.
- A 37-year-old man in Miami, Florida got fatally struck by lightning and died on July 8, 2007.
- A 41-year-old man named Paul Gauci died using a butterfly bomb as a mallet as he welded in Rabat, Malta on October 1, 1981.
- American distiller Jack Daniel died of sepsis infection or blood poisoning in his right foot on October 9, 1911.
- Canadian lawyer Garry Hoy who fell from the 24th floor of his office building of the "unbreakable" window at the Toronto-Dominion Centre, died on July 9, 1993.
- South Korean unidentified gamer who played a non-stop online game over 50 hours, died of dehydration and heart failure on August 9, 2005.
- In New York, The Gramercy Park asbestos steam exploded and fatally killed a con ed worker in the 3rd floor and injured 24 people on August 19, 1989.
- A concrete slab falling and killing Lea Guilbeault at a Montreal restaurant on July 16, 2009.
- A man named Jason Findley died of electrocution of cause of a lightning strike using the telephone in his grandparents' house in Scotch Plains, New Jersey on May 21, 1985.
- An accident at the Byford Dolphin oil rig, located in the North Sea off the coast of Norway, cost five people their lives in a particularly horrifying way. The incident shocked the public and led to more stringent safety regulations for those diving at inhospitable depths of the controversy on November 5, 1983.
- A 43-year-old city worker named Archie Tyler died after going down the drain in The Bronx, New York on March 2, 2001.
- A 30-year-old architect and pedestrian named Jodie Lane got electrocuted while walking through New York's East Village with her two dogs. Her dogs were shocked first; when she tried to help them, she stepped onto the electrified metal cover of a utility box on January 16, 2004.
- A 26-year-old man named John Edward Jones died when stuck for more than 24 hours at Nutty Putty Cave in Utah County, Utah on November 24, 2009.
- A man named Jeff Reese died of rapid overweight loss, heart malfunction, and kidney failure on December 6, 1997.
- A 16-year-old woman named Tanya Nickens died by drowning in the hot tub at a prom party at Wall Township, New Jersey on May 25, 1996.
- A Polish-French physicist and chemist named Marie Curie died of aplastic anemia on July 4, 1934.
- Austrian-French inventor Franz Reichelt died falling off the Eiffel Tower, "flying," on February 4, 1912.
- A baseball player named Ray Chapman died from blunt-force trauma from a baseball at Polo Grounds, New York on August 16, 1920.
- A beach visitor and a fisherman named John Raymond Wilson died trapped in quicksand at Crystal Beach, Galveston, Texas on May 23, 2005.
- A Lithuanian-American professional tennis player named Vitas Gerulaitis died by carbon monoxide gas poisoning from an improperly installed heater, causing it to seep into the guesthouse until the maid discovered the body at Southampton, New York on September 17, 1994.
- A 16-year-old golfer died from hitting a bench with his golf club out of frustration and piercing his heart, killing him instantly on July 10, 1994.
- A 48-year-old English scientist died drinking 10 gallons of carrot juice which caused his skin to be orange-colored on February 17, 1974.
- A 51-year-old man at Cambridgeshire, England named Ronald McClagish died trapped inside his bedroom cupboard for a week, and he succumbed to bronchitis before he was found. The paramedics pronounced McClagish dead on February 15, 2004.
- A 35-year-old woman named Patsy Campbell from Portage, Indiana, died of sepsis and suffered second-degree burns covering 70% of her body at the tanning bed on May 24, 1989.
- Japanese kabuki actor named Bandō Mitsugorō VIII visited a restaurant in Kyoto with his friends on January 16, 1975. He ordered four portions of puffer fish liver (Japanese: フグの肝/Hepburn: Fugu no Kimo); the liver of the puffer fish is mostly toxic and the sale is prohibited by local ordinaries and banned nationally in 1984. He ate one puffer fish liver and he initially survived the fish's poison; he ate the livers of the remaining puffer fish and he died following 8 hours of gradual paralysis and breathing difficulties.
- An 18-year-old man named Ricardo Alberto Martinez died in a car wash entangled by wires and automatic brushes on September 1, 2007.
- A 30-year-old kite launching director named Steve Edeiken (or Ivan Lester McGuire) died of multiple injuries when his ankle got entangled in the lines of the Jalbert parafoil kite. He plunged 100 feet to the ground, dying on September 24, 1983.
- A 24-year-old man named Philip Quinn died when a lava lamp exploded in a stove penetrating his heart on November 28, 2004.
- A man got electrocuted by a microwave at his home at Nicholas County, Kentucky on January 5, 1998.
- A 28-year-old man named Peter John Robinson from Reefton, New Zealand died after he fell on ice and drowned in his cat's water bowl on August 15, 2001.
- A 50-year-old man named Alex Mitchell from King's Lynn at Norfolk, England died of over 25 minutes of non-stop laughing, causing heart failure on March 24, 1975.
- A 20-year-old man died after falling off a sixth-floor balcony during a party on February 21, 2004.
- A 56-year-old woman died of the cooking pot explosion at Winslow, Indiana on July 29, 2008.
- In Paris, France located at Air France Flight 112/Boeing 777, Two unidentified men died of hypothermia and one fell on approach to Pudong International Airport on January 23, 2003.
- A 28-year-old woman named Jennifer Strange died of apparent water intoxication after participating in a contest by local radio station KDND 107.9 on January 12, 2007.
- A 58-year-old man named Charles Stephens died while attempting to go over Niagara Falls, Ontario, Canada, in a barrel on July 11, 1920.
- A 55-year-old Michigan woman named Judy Kay Zagorski died of blunt force injury when an eagle ray jumped out of the water at Vaca Keys, Florida on March 20, 2008.
- The Collyer brothers, extreme hoarders, ultimately died inside their cluttered home at Harlem, New York on March 21, 1947.

=== Seasons ===
Season	Episodes	Premiere date	Finale date
1	6	October 31, 2009	December 11, 2009
2	13	March 16, 2012	April 27, 2012

=== Series overview ===
Season	Episodes	Originally released	
Season	Episodes	First released	Last released
1	6	October 31, 2009	December 11, 2009
2	13	March 16, 2012	April 27, 2012

=== Season 1 (2009) ===
The first season of Curious and Unusual Deaths aired from October 31 to December 11, 2009 by Discovery Channel Canada and Investigation Discovery.

No. in season	Title	Directed by	Written by	Original release date

=== Season 2 (2012) ===
The first season of Curious and Unusual Deaths aired from March 16 to April 27, 2012 by Discovery Channel Canada and Investigation Discovery.

No. in season	Title	Directed by	Written by	Original release date

== Foreign names ==
- Morts insolites (Translated: Unusual deaths) - Canadian French version
- Morts subites (Translated: Sudden deaths) - European French version
- Extrañas formas de morir (Translated: Strange ways to die) - Latin American Spanish version
- As Mais Estranhas Formas de Morrer (Translated: The Strangest Ways to Die) - Brazilian Portuguese version
- Strani Modi Per Morire (Translated: Strange Ways to Die) - Italian version
- 奇异死亡 (Pinyin: Qíyì Sǐwáng / Translated: Strange Death) - Mandarin version
- 奇異死亡 (Jyutping: kei4ji6 sei2mong4 / Translated: Bizarre death) - Cantonese version

== See also ==
- 1000 Ways to Die
