= Jay Gilligan =

American performer

Jay Gilligan is a professional juggler and performer from Arcadia, Ohio currently performing and living in Europe. Jay is a teacher of juggling and works at many circus schools overseas. He has been called one of the most famous living jugglers by writers at the usenet group rec.juggling. He has performed in many European countries and every state in America. Jay toured American cities in the summer 2006 and summer 2007 with the Shoebox Tour. Jay is also the main teacher of juggling and creator of the juggling program at the University of Dance and Circus in Stockholm, Sweden.
