= 1000 Ways to Lie =

American television special program

- Genre: Docufiction; Docudrama
- Written by: Aliyah Silverstein
- Directed by: Thom Beers
- Narrated by: John Glover
- Country of origin: United States
- Original language: English
- No. of seasons: 1
- No. of episodes: 1

Production
- Running time: 22 minutes

Original release
- Network: Spike
- Release: March 3, 2010

1000 Ways to Lie is an American television special and spin-off of the television series 1000 Ways to Die. It recreates intricate lies that people have told, as well as how, and what happened when they were found out. It also includes interviews with experts who describe the science behind each lie. The special aired on Spike on March 3, 2010.

== Stylizations ==
The special is in the style of its parent show, by telling the location and date with a border that has the words "Liar", "Deception", "Greed", "Money", "Shame", "Secrets" and "Betray" surrounding a picture of the incident. At the end of each summary, there is another picture of the incident, and the "Way to Lie #" and the nickname for the incident typed over the image in yellow "True Crimes" font, mocking the 1000 Ways to Die presentation. At the beginning of the episode there is a sped-up voice over that is merely the voice over from 1000 Ways to Die with a few words changed around:

"WARNING: The stories portrayed in this show are based on real scams and depict illegal activities."

"The names have been changed to protect the guilty... and the gullible."
"Do not attempt to try ANY of the actions depicted."

"YOU CAN BE ARRESTED AND/OR PROSECUTED!"

The disclaimer then cuts to animation while the voice-over reads:

"Everybody lies, and everybody gets lied too. We lie to get ahead, we lie to get the girl, and to keep our secrets. Whether motivated by greed, ego, or criminal intent, just when you think you've heard it all... there's 1000 Ways to Lie."

=== Failed pilot episode ===
Originally aired March 3, 2010, the first episode was to be called "Natural Born Liars", but because it got negative reviews, 1000 Ways to Lie became a special instead of a spin-off, and "Natural Born Liars" is no longer an episode title. 1000 Ways to Lie hasn't aired again since.

Lie#	Event Name	Date of Event	Location	Circumstance
333	The Unaboober	April 8, 2006	Bixville, California	A woman addicted to heroin plans to smuggle Mexican heroin in her breast implants. On her way to the border, she extracts some of the heroin from her breasts with a needle to get high, unknowingly spilling it all over her shirt and is subsequently apprehended by the border patrol.
256	Phony Five-O	October 2, 2007	Cameron, Illinois	A recently paroled convicted felon wants to fulfill his childhood dream to become a police officer, but because of his record, he has to falsify his records as an FBI agent to become one. Even though he is successful in apprehending numerous criminals, he is eventually found out by a local reporter in town who did a background check on him to ensure his credibility to see if he is an agent or not. The reporter then contacts the real FBI authorities and soon after he is arrested by the FBI. Due to his falsified records and the history of his convicted felony including the new charges of impersonation of an FBI agent, all the cases including the evidences he worked on are now considered equivocal and invalid, resulting in all cases being dropped and all apprehended criminals being released, including a man who murdered his family.
178	Not So Sick Rick	September 19, 2008	Henrietta, Texas	A man tells his shrewish, nagging wife that he is dying of pancreatic cancer so he could get away from her, get her to stop nagging, get her to appreciate him more, and go out partying with his friends at strip clubs. He is exposed when his wife, skeptical of his story due to how much partying he was doing, calls the hospital and finds out the truth. Rather than divorcing him, she makes his life more miserable than ever.
691	Bunnies In The Oven	May 24, 1991	Leesburg, Virginia	A young woman schemes with her husband to make claims that a male rabbit impregnated her and that she reportedly gave birth to little bunny children. The couple had the townspeople fooled, but not the county medical examiner who knew that it was impossible for an animal to impregnate a human. When he sees the woman stick the bunnies into her vagina, he immediately tells the townspeople. The couple is ordered to pay all the money back and leave town immediately. This stunt may have been inspired by the story of Mary Toft.
212	Hey Dad, Nice Rack	October 31, 1935	St. Louis, Missouri	Billy Tipton wants to blend in with the popular male musicians, so he hides his identity by wrapping his breasts tightly and wearing a strap-on dildo at all times. 17 years later while having sex, he suffers a near heart attack. The woman he is having sex with opens his chest to reveal the truth, much to the shock of the musician's adopted son.
884	Smooth Operator	October 19, 1968	Da Nang, Vietnam	A con artist who specializes in false identities is drafted into the Vietnam War. During the war, he steals the ID tags of a deceased army surgeon and inadvertently takes up the responsibility of amputating the limbs of wounded soldiers. The con artist is surprisingly competent at his job and when confronted by the parents of the dead surgeon, he concocts a story that results in the late son being revered as a war hero.
