= Sammy Obeid =

American writer and stand-up comedian (born 1984)

- Obeid in 2026
- Born: February 9, 1984 (age 42); Oakland, California, U.S.
- Education: UC Berkeley (B.S.)

Comedy career
- Years active: 2008–present
- Medium: Stand-up; YouTube
- Genres: Observational comedy; satire
- Website: sammyko.com

Sammy K. Obeid (born February 9, 1984) is a Palestinian-American writer and stand-up comedian. He has released one comedy album, Get Funny or Die Tryin. The New York Times described his comedy as displaying "an analytic style full of wordplay, clever misdirection and ethnic humor riffing on his Middle Eastern roots". On his website, Obeid is described as 'Lebanese-Palestinian-Syrian-Italian-American'.

Obeid has been featured on America's Got Talent, Conan and Last Comic Standing. He once performed 1,001 nights of comedy in a row, which he claimed as a world record. Obeid is also a host for the Netflix show 100 Humans and the founder of KO Comedy.

== Early life ==
Sammy Obeid was born in Oakland, California and was raised in Fremont. He attended Mission San Jose High School and graduated in 2002. Obeid earned bachelor’s degrees in applied mathematics and business administration from UC Berkeley in 2006.

== Career ==
After graduating, Obeid became a high school math teacher in Fremont and started performing comedy routines for Ohlone College's speech and debate team, and by 2009 he was performing at local comedy shows around the Bay Area. He won first place in a Bay Area-wide comedy competition in 2008, and he won the Vallejo Music Theatre’s Friday Night Supper Club’s Comedy Clash in 2009.

Obeid performed a 1,001-day streak of consecutive daily comedy shows from December 26, 2010 to September 21, 2013, breaking the previous 730-day record set by Hal Sparks. Shortly before finishing the streak, he made his television debut on Conan on September 18, 2013.

Obeid was scheduled to perform two shows at the Victoria Theatre in Singapore on August 31, 2025. On August 27, Obeid announced on Instagram that Singapore's Infocomm Media Development Authority (IMDA) had refused to issue permits for the performance. Obeid stated that IMDA required multiple rounds of edits to his script, including the removal of all references to Israel, Palestine and the Gaza war. He said IMDA still rejected his script after he made the required edits. In an August 28 statement, IMDA stated they had not requested edits of Obeid's script. It said Obeid's application was not accepted because it came less than 40 working days before the performance. On September 1, authorities in Singapore issued Obeid with a Protection from Online Falsehoods and Manipulation Act (POFMA) correction order over the claims he was told to edit his script by the regulators. On September 4, the Government of Singapore said it had directed Meta and Twitter to issue correction notices, because Obeid had not complied with the correction order. The order requires the social media platforms to inform users in Singapore who have viewed or may view the posts.

== Political activism ==
Obeid is an outspoken advocate for the Palestinian rights, and he frequently incorporates political commentary on Palestine and Israel into his stand-up comedy. He has described his approach to comedy about Palestine as filling a void left by other comedians, stating, "Really, I treat comedy about Palestine like an illegal settler does land in the West Bank. Like, if I do not take this, someone else will". He has also organized an international "Ceasefire Comedy" tour, launched a platform called Pal Collective to connect individuals with families in Gaza for support, and has been open about facing potential career repercussions, including losing booked shows and feeling pressure to self-censor due to his pro-Palestine views.

Obeid was interviewed and featured in the award-winning documentary feature film Seeds for Liberation (2026) by director Matthew Solomon. The film discusses the Free Palestine movement.

== See also ==
- Palestine exception - policies and laws that restricts the voices, scholarship, and advocacy of Palestinians rights
- Cultural discourse about the Gaza war
