= Back to the Woods =

Back to the Woods may refer to:

== Film ==
- Back to the Woods (1918 film), a comedy film starring Mabel Normand
- Back to the Woods (1919 film), a comedy short starring Harold Lloyd
- Back to the Woods (1937 film), a Three Stooges short

== Television ==
- "Back to the Woods", Ax Men season 10, episode 1 (2019)
- "Back to the Woods", Family Guy season 6, episode 9 (2008)
- "Back to the Woods", Moonshiners season 9, episode 1 (2019)

== Other media ==
- Back to the Woods: The Story of a Fall from Grace, a 1903 novel by George V. Hobart
- Back to the Woods, a 2023 poetry book by Cynthia Cruz
- Back to the Woods (album), a 2015 studio album by Angel Haze

== See also ==
- Back to the Forest, a 1980 Japanese animated television special
- Into the Woods (disambiguation)
- Out of the Woods (disambiguation)
