= Ax Men =

American reality television series

- Genre: Reality
- Starring: (see article)
- Narrated by: Thom Beers
- Opening theme: "All Along the Watchtower" performed by Jimi Hendrix (Season 1 only)
- Country of origin: United States
- No. of seasons: 10
- No. of episodes: 166 (list of episodes)

Production
- Executive producers: Dolores Gavin; Thom Beers
- Producer: Marc Marriott
- Running time: 45–48 minutes
- Production company: Original Productions

Original release
- Network: History
- Release: March 9, 2008 – September 12, 2019

Related
- The Legend of Shelby the Swamp Man; The Return of Shelby the Swamp Man

Ax Men is an American reality television series that aired on History from March 9, 2008, to September 12, 2019. The program follows the work of several logging crews in the second-growth forests of Northwestern Oregon, Washington and Montana and the rivers of Louisiana and Florida. The show highlights the dangers encountered by the loggers. Following in the footsteps of other shows from Original Productions, like Deadliest Catch and Ice Road Truckers, the series is considered part of a recent "real-men-in-real-danger" television programming trend.

== Cast overview ==
| Company | Seasons | | | | | | | | | |
| Company | 1 | 2 | 3 | 4 | 5 | 6 | 7 | 8 | 9 | 10 |
|---|---|---|---|---|---|---|---|---|---|---|
| J.M. Browning Logging | Main | | | | | | | | | |
| Gustafson Logging | Main | | | | | | | | | |
| Pihl Logging | Main | | | | | | | | | Main |
| Stump Branch Logging | Main | | | | | | | | | |
| R&R Conner Aviation | | Main | | | | | | | | |
| Rygaard Logging | | Main | | | | | | | | |
| S&S Aqua Logging | | Main | | | | | | | | |
| Collins River Logging | | | Main | | | | | | | |
| Swamp Man Logging | | | Main | | | | | | | |
| Lemare Lake Logging | | | | Main | | Main | | | | |
| Papac Alaska Logging | | | | Main | | | | | | |
| Big Gun Logging | | | | | Main | | | | | |
| H.H. Horse Logging | | | | | Main | | | | | |
| Siderius Logging | | | | | Main | | | | | |
| Uncle Buck Logging | | | | | Main | | | | | |
| Wheeler Logging | | | | | Main | | | | | |
| Willett Logging | | | | | Main | | | | | |
| Dreadknots Logging | | | | | | Main | | | | |
| Wisconsin Woodchuck | | | | | | Main | | | | |
| Ax Cut Lumber | | | | | | | Main | | | |
| Chapman Logging | | | | | | | Main | | | |
| Kelly Oakes & Sons Logging | | | | | | | Main | | | |
| Triack Resources | | | | | | | | Main | | |
| Zitterkopf & Sons Logging | | | | | | | | Main | | |
| Gary & Eddie | | | | | | | | | Main | |
| Buckin' Billy Ray's Tree Service | | | | | | | | | | Main |
| Etienne'e Timber | | | | | | | | | | Main |
| Harkness Logging | | | | | | | | | | Main |

=== Season 1 ===
==== J.M. Browning Logging ====
J.M. Browning Logging is owned by Jay Browning, a 34-year veteran of the logging industry. His left hand was torn off in a logging accident, but he now wears a prosthesis that allows him to operate a chainsaw. Jay runs his company with a "hire the best in the business and use the best equipment" philosophy. His sons Jesse and Jared work for him; Jesse is scheduled to take over the company one day. Jay Browning started his logging company in 1985. His company has been headquartered in Astoria in Clatsop County ever since.

==== Gustafson Logging ====
Gustafson Logging Company is a clearcut logging company based out of Astoria, Oregon.

The company takes contracts to cut timber in Oregon's second growth forests. Gustafson Logging is currently owned by three brothers, Clay, Mark and Wade Gustafson, sons of Duane Gustafson. The company was started in 1974 by Duane Gustafson. Darrell Holthusen is the "side rod," or crew foreman.

==== Pihl Logging ====
Pihl Logging is owned by Mike Pihl. Comments by employee Dwayne Dethlefs are often featured in promotional spots for the show; his son Dustin also works for the company. Both of them quit at the end of Season 2, with Dustin moving to Alaska in Season 4 to work for Olson Marine (see below). Dwayne returned to the company in Season 10 at Mike's request. Pihl is based in Vernonia, Oregon.

==== Stump Branch Logging ====
This company, owned by Melvin Lardy and based in Buxton, Oregon, eats, sleeps and breathes logging. He's been in the business for more than a decade, but recently landed a monstrous job that could be his big break – if it doesn't break him in the process. Melvin's equipment is the logger's beginner set – a collection of rusted hunks of metal that stop at a moment's notice and shut down production without warning. Melvin has always succeeded where others have failed, though, and he's hoping his luck will hold out on this job. Part of his success depends on greenhorn Michael, who's been on the job only one month. Michael is working alongside his childhood buddies at Stump Branch, but lifelong friendship won't get him anywhere when it comes to learning the logging business. Michael is catching on quickly, but this business doesn't cut anyone a break.

=== Season 2 ===
The Pihl and Browning crews are featured in this season, along with three other companies.

==== R&R Conner Aviation ====
Ryan and Robin Conner founded this company in 2000 in Conner, Montana. They specialize in "heli-logging": using a helicopter to airlift felled trees from terrain too steep or hostile to reach with an access road. The helicopter was restored at The Pitstop Inc..

==== Rygaard Logging ====
This company, based in Port Angeles, Washington, was founded by Craig Rygaard in 1992. His sons Gabe and Jason are his business partners. Craig retires at the end of Season 6 and turns the business over to Gabe. One of the company's support truckers is Todd Dewey, who is also an ice road trucker during winter. He is the nephew of Craig and cousin of Gabe and Jason. Todd is featured in Season 8. Gabe was killed in an automobile accident on September 16, 2016 at the age of 45. As of Season 10, Jason is now in charge of the business.

==== S&S Aqua Logging ====
Founded by Jimmy Smith in South Cle Elum, Washington, S&S recovers sunken old-growth logs from the beds of rivers that were used by earlier generations of loggers to float them downstream. The company motto is "Recovering the forests of yesterday to save the forests of tomorrow," reflecting their commitment to never cut down a live tree. His son James is active in the business, leaving to work for Collins River Logging in Season 3 and returning to S&S in Season 4.

=== Season 3 ===
The same companies from Season 2 (Rygaard, Conner, Browning, S&S and Pihl) are featured in Season 3, which takes place during summer rather than fall/winter. Due to trouble with Washington state permits (see below), S&S relocates to White Springs, Florida and begins working with Collins River Logging. Two new crew appears alongside these five:

==== Collins River Logging ====
Florida river logger Joe Collins specializes in finding preserved logs lost in mill waterways during the 1880s logging boom. He oversees a team of southern-style aqua loggers, including boat captain Steve "Uncle Buck" Livingston, young diver Patrick "Pond Bear" Swilley, deckhand Geoff "G-Dog" Dunnam and U.S. Air Force veteran diver Jess Horstman. Joining Joe's team this season are the father/son duo Jimmy and James Smith from the Washington-based S&S Aqua Logging. The company's search for treasure in the fast-flowing, pitch black waters of the Suwannee River is made even more dangerous by the venomous water snakes and huge alligators that inhabit the area.

==== Swamp Man Logging ====
Shelby Stanga has lived in the swamps north of New Orleans since he was nine years old, and he has been logging in the area for 37 years. He recovers abandoned logs from the nearby waterways with an ever-evolving cast of sidekicks—his dog Willy; his friends Earl, Bob, and DaVi; his cousins Jarvis and Belinda; his nieces Cheyenne and Stephanie; and his wife Donna.

=== Season 4 ===
Pihl, Browning, Rygaard, Collins, S&S, and Swamp Man appear in this season, again working the summer logging season, along with two new crews.

==== Lemare Lake Logging ====
This company, based in British Columbia, was founded by Dave Dutcyvich in the mid-1980s and is now owned by his son Eric. They concentrate on harvesting timber from the remote islands off Canada's west coast, hauling in equipment and supplies by barge to allow them to live on the job site when necessary.

==== Papac Alaska Logging ====
Headquartered in Craig, Alaska, this company was founded by Mike Papac as an offshoot of his father's Washington-based logging business. For job sites on islands, the Ketchikan, Alaska-based transport company Olson Marine, owned by Rick Olson, hauls Papac's logs over the water by barge and tugboat to reach mainland collection points and processing facilities.

=== Season 5 ===
Papac, Rygaard, S&S, and Swamp Man appear in this season, along with six new crews.

==== Big Gun Logging ====
Based in Vernonia, Oregon, Big Gun is a new company started by former Pihl cutter Levi Brown. Mike Pihl, his former boss, helps the crew start out by contracting a job to them and leasing an old yarder. Later in the season, Levi leases a more powerful yarder and calls in Pihl operator Leland Bontrager to run it.

==== H.H. Horse Logging ====
This company, founded by Jason Rutledge and based in Floyd County, Virginia, has been in operation for 10 years. The crew uses teams of horses to pull felled trees off job sites without the need for heavy machinery or access roads. Jason's son Jagger is the crew leader.

==== Siderius Logging ====
This company was started by Dan Siderius in 2009 and is based in Kalispell, Montana. His crew is younger than most others and focuses on jobs on/around rugged mountain terrain.

==== Uncle Buck Logging ====
This Florida-based outfit is run by "Uncle" Buck Livingston, a Suwannee River logger who helped both S&S and Collins by killing an alligator that menaced the crews in an earlier season. He has recruited Patrick Swilley from Collins to work as his diver.

==== Wheeler Logging and Willett Logging ====
These two companies operate in rural New Hampshire, using teams of oxen to pull logs off job sites. Wheeler Logging was founded by Barry Wheeler, who now runs the crew with his son Marshall; Devin and Justin Willett, Barry's nephews, formed Willett Logging to compete with them.

=== Season 6 ===
Rygaard, Papac, S&S, Swamp Man, Lemare Lake, and Big Gun appear in this season, which was filmed before the death of Jimmy Smith. S&S relocates to North Florida's Withlacoochee River. Jimmy and James return to Washington partway through the season, leaving Patrick Swilley and diver Brad Taylor in charge of the S&S boat. Two new crews appear in this season: Dreadknots Logging and Wisconsin Woodchuck.

==== Dreadknots Logging ====
This crew, headed by Clint Roberts, has been working to recover logs from the Withlacoochee for over four years. Clint's crew consists of diver Dave Stone ("The Kraken") and deckhand Chris Miller ("River Guide"). Chris was replaced by Katelyn Sims, who plays the role of Dave's cousin, but in reality, the two are in fact unrelated, in Season 7. They find logs by firing a revolver into the water and listening for differences in the echoing reports.

==== Wisconsin Woodchuck ====
Based in Superior, Wisconsin, this company was formed in 2005 to salvage old-growth lumber structures so the material can be reused. Their main project is to dismantle the Globe Elevator, the largest grain storage facility in the world when it was built in the 1880s. Judy Peres and David Hozza are the co-owners.

=== Season 7 ===
Rygaard, Papac, Swamp Man, and the Dreadknots appear in this season, with three new crews, Kelly Oakes & Sons Logging, Chapman Logging, and Ax Cut Lumber. Dave Stone briefly goes into business for himself, using the old S&S boat, but it sinks under the weight of a load of logs.

==== Ax Cut Lumber ====
This company, based in Pearl River, Louisiana, is owned by twin brothers Ronald and Donald Jones. They focus on recovering sunken cypress logs from remote swampland, often calling in family members (including their brother Tommy and sister Brandie) to round out the crew.

==== Chapman Logging ====
This company, owned by Greg Chapman, has been recovering logs from Florida's rivers for 15 years and currently works the St. Johns River. Greg's crew consists of deckhand Leslie Jeter, master diver Roger Gunter, and newly hired diver Patrick Swilley (previously worked for Uncle Buck in season 5, Collins/S&S Logging in seasons 3 and 4, and S&S in season 6). He trained Clint Roberts when Clint was starting in the river logging business.

==== Kelly Oakes & Sons Logging ====
This company, based in Port Angeles, Washington and owned by Kelly Oakes, has been a longtime rival of Rygaard. Kelly's sons Josh and Jacob are part of his crew.

=== Season 8 ===
Rygaard, Papac, Dreadknots, Chapman, and Swamp Man return for this season, along with two new crews.

==== Triack Resources ====
Owned by Dave McRae, this company has been active in British Columbia for over 30 years, logging on difficult sites that other companies either cannot or will not attempt. His sons Alec and Kellie are part of the crew.

==== Zitterkopf & Sons Logging ====
This company, owned by David Zitterkopf, harvests timber from remote areas in the western United States. The crew, which includes his sons Zane, Ethan, and Levi, camps on the job sites.

=== Season 9 ===
Rygaard, Papac, Chapman, Zitterkopf, and Swamp Man return for this season, with one new crew.

==== Gary and Eddie ====
Gary Champagne and Eddie Frashier have lived, hunted, and fished in the Mississippi River delta for years. This is their first year venturing into swamp logging, attracted by the potential for large payoffs.

=== Season 10 ===
Pihl and Rygaard return for this season, along with three new companies.

==== Buckin' Billy Ray's Tree Service ====
Billy Ray Smith owns this company, which is based in Nanaimo, British Columbia and focuses on cutting down trees that pose a danger to private landowners. He prefers to work with vintage chainsaws and hand-crafted axes and is training his son Hogan in the business.

==== Etienne's Timber ====
Based in St. Croix, Indiana, this company was founded by Phil Etienne in 1973. He and his wife Joann ran it until Phil retired in 2002; their son "Logger" Wade now handles daily operations. Wade specializes in customizing and re-configuring the company's equipment to handle difficult logging challenges.

==== Harkness Logging ====
This company, owned by Frank Harkness and founded by his father, is based in Acme, Washington. Frank uses a custom-designed cable/tether system to move logs and personnel on job sites that are too steep to walk on. His sons Brandon and Jay R are part of his crew.

== Series overview ==
| Season | Episodes | Originally released | | |
| Season | Episodes | First released | Last released | Network |
|---|---|---|---|---|
| 1 | 14 | March 9, 2008 | June 8, 2008 | History |
| 2 | 13 | March 2, 2009 | May 18, 2009 | History |
| 3 | 13 | January 10, 2010 | April 18, 2010 | History |
| 4 | 20 | December 12, 2010 | May 8, 2011 | History |
| 5 | 20 | January 8, 2012 | May 20, 2012 | History |
| 6 | 20 | December 9, 2012 | June 2, 2013 | History |
| 7 | 21 | November 10, 2013 | April 6, 2014 | History |
| 8 | 20 | November 30, 2014 | April 26, 2015 | History |
| 9 | 15 | November 22, 2015 | March 6, 2016 | History |
| 10 | 10 | July 11, 2019 | September 12, 2019 | History |

== Release ==
=== International airings ===
Ax Men aired in the United Kingdom on the local variant of the History channel, then later aired on the terrestrial Channel 5, where the title was changed to Axe Men. The latest season has returned to History.

Ax Men airs in Canada on History Canada, in India on History TV18, in Australia on 7mate and A&E Australia, in Germany on History, in France on W9 and on RMC Découverte, in Spain on Xplora and previously on Discovery Max, in Lithuania on TV6 and aired in Croatia on RTL 2.

=== Home media ===
The first six seasons have been released on DVD, both as individual volumes and as a box sets.

== Legal action against S&S Aqua Logging ==
On 13 March 2009, the Washington Department of Natural Resources (DNR) seized more than two dozen logs that may have been illegally salvaged by S&S Aqua Logging. DNR officers served a search warrant on the company to retrieve timber they had pulled from the Hoquiam River without a permit.

Jimmy Smith, who owned and operated S&S, said on the show that the logs were worth about $10,000, according to search warrant records.

"These are valuable materials that belong to the public and this looks like theft, plain and simple. They are part of the functioning ecosystem, so removing the log would be like removing part of the bed," state Public Lands Commissioner Peter Goldmark said.

According to Greg Hueckel, the DNR's fish and wildlife habitat programs director, "Logs provide a key function for rivers in trapping sediment, harboring insects and other food for fish, and creating pools and riffles where fish can rest." Hueckel said his agency typically grants permits to remove logs in situations where flooding causes log jams and it's unlikely that a permit would be granted for timber harvest.

== Deaths ==
On November 1, 2012, Jimmy Smith of S&S Aqua Logging died. Details of the continuation of his business are still uncertain. The sixth season's debut episode, All or Nothing, was dedicated in his memory.

William Bart Colantuono, who appeared on seasons two and three of the show, was killed on September 18, 2013 when his helicopter crashed while attempting to lift logs in an Oregon forest. The History Channel described Colantuono's role as "a smart pilot who isn't afraid to take risks. He's been flying for a long time and views helicopter logging as a competitive sport. He competes against himself, against the machine and against the weather." Witnesses told Linn County deputies that the pilot released the logs before crashing, indicating he knew of a problem. Witnesses say they also saw a rotor separate from the copter before it flipped and crashed upside down. The Season 7 episode "Axes and Allies" was dedicated to his memory.

On September 16, 2016, Rygaard Logging owner-operator Gabe Rygaard was killed in a motor vehicle crash on U.S. Route 101 in Port Angeles, Washington. The Washington State Patrol reported that Rygaard was driving a white Ford Bronco that rear-ended a left-turning vehicle before crossing the center road line into the path of an oncoming vehicle.

Dwayne Dethlefs of Pihl Logging died December 6, 2019.

Joe Collins from Collins River Logging died on January 22, 2024.

Melvin Lardy of Pihl Logging died December 2, 2024

== Awards and nominations ==
| Award | Year (Note: Indicates the year of ceremony. Each year is linked to the article about the awards held that year, wherever possible.) | Category | Nominee(s) / Work | Result | Ref(s) |
|---|---|---|---|---|---|
| Motion Picture Sound Editors (MPSE) Golden Reel Awards | 2015 | Best Sound Editing – Short Form Sound Effects, Foley, Dialogue and ADR in Television Documentary | Bob Bronow, Doug Kern, Eddie Rodriguez: "Ax Marks the Spot" | Won | |

== Notes ==
1. The Season had an Introduction Episode which upped the number to 21 episodes in a season and changed the season premier to November 3, though the episode is not considered the first episode of the season.
