= List of Ax Men episodes =

The following is a list of episodes of the American reality television series, Ax Men, seen on the History channel. The show ended production in 2016 after nine seasons, but returned for a tenth in July 2019.

As of September 12, 2019, 166 episodes of Ax Men have aired.

== Series overview ==
Season	Episodes	Originally released		
Season	Episodes	First released	Last released	Network
1	14	March 9, 2008	June 8, 2008	History
2	13	March 2, 2009	May 18, 2009	History
3	13	January 10, 2010	April 18, 2010	History
4	20	December 12, 2010	May 8, 2011	History
5	20	January 8, 2012	May 20, 2012	History
6	20	December 9, 2012	June 2, 2013	History
7	21	November 10, 2013	April 6, 2014	History
8	20	November 30, 2014	April 26, 2015	History
9	15	November 22, 2015	March 6, 2016	History
10	10	July 11, 2019	September 12, 2019	History

== Episodes ==
=== Season 1 (2008) ===
No. overall	No. in season	Title	Original release date
1	1	"Man vs. Mountain"	March 9, 2008
2	2	"Risk and Reward"	March 16, 2008
3	3	"Storm Season Strikes"	March 23, 2008
4	4	"The Big Hit"	March 30, 2008
5	5	"Market Meltdown"	April 6, 2008
6	6	"Reversal of Fortune"	April 13, 2008
7	7	"The Close Call"	April 20, 2008
8	8	"Loggers Under Fire"	April 27, 2008
9	9	"A Logger's Thanksgiving"	May 4, 2008
10	10	"Black Friday"	May 11, 2008
11	11	"Storm of the Century"	May 18, 2008
Addresses December 2007 Pacific Northwest storms.
12	12	"The Toughest Season"	May 25, 2008
A recap of key events in the previous 11 episodes.
13	13	"Picking Up the Pieces"	June 1, 2008
Crumbling access roads and flooded homes leave all four companies reeling.
14	14	"The Final Haul"	June 8, 2008
The crews race to get their last loads to the mills as the season winds down.

Season 1 final load counts:

- Browning – 278
- Stump Branch – 132
- Pihl – 130
- Gustafson – 121

=== Season 2 (2009) ===
No. overall	No. in season	Title	Original release date
15	0	"The Road to Season 2"	February 26, 2009
Note: The season has an introductory episode which increased the number to 13 episodes for the season and changed the season premiere to February 26, though the episode is not considered the first episode of the season. A recap of returning and an introduction of three new logging companies.
16	1	"Ax Men Cometh"	March 2, 2009
The Pihl, Browning and Rygaard crews set up operations for the beginning of the logging season; S&S goes into the water to start pulling logs from the riverbeds.
17	2	"Initiation Day"	March 9, 2009
Equipment problems pose a challenge for S&S and Browning; Brad, the new hire at Rygaard, has trouble keeping up the pace; Dwayne's mounting frustration leads him to walk off the Pihl job.
18	3	"By Air, Land and Sea"	March 16, 2009
S&S tries to haul in a gigantic old-growth log; an electrical fire nearly destroys the Rygaard yarder; Conner puts its rebuilt helicopter into service to start moving loads; Dwayne returns to work but finds a cool reception waiting for him.
19	4	"Moby Dick Strikes"	March 23, 2009
Father-son arguments threaten to derail the S&S effort to pull in the enormous log; Conner's strategy to speed up production endangers its ground crew; Dwayne is sent to work on the landing after his previous disagreements; Craig and Gabe have different ideas about how to deal with Brad, who continues to struggle on the Rygaard job.
20	5	"The King Crumbles"	March 30, 2009
S&S heads into new waters to chase down a big payoff; Jesse runs into trouble while setting the Browning crew up at a new site; motion sickness and a winter storm throw Conner's operations into turmoil; Rygaard out-produces Browning as Brad begins to pick up the pace.
21	6	"Lost in the Fog"	April 13, 2009
Bart, Conner's senior pilot, has to face down two storms back to back; Craig and Gabe decide whether or not to keep Brad on at Rygaard as they move to a new site; the Pihl cutters must contend with a dangerous stretch of rotted standing trees; S&S tries to get a load of timber to shore without losing their barge to the river currents.
22	7	"One Weak Link"	April 20, 2009
The Pihl crew struggles to bring enormous trees up to the landing; S&S faces mechanical trouble on the barge and near-freezing water temperatures in the river; Conner's business hinges on how quickly Steve, its junior pilot, can get used to flying the helicopter; Brad's inexperience earns Craig's wrath and leads to an injury at the Rygaard site, after which he walks off the job.
23	8	"The Ax Falls"	April 27, 2009
Steve's slow pace, rough maneuvering and motion sickness result in his dismissal from Conner; S&S tries to pull in an old dock built from valuable logs; Jesse's nerves fray badly as equipment damage idles the Browning crew; Brad gets one last chance to pull his weight at Rygaard, but quits at the end of the day; Pihl puts an extra cutter on the mountain, only for him to go missing as the weather worsens.
24	9	"Fresh Meat"	May 4, 2009
With winter fast approaching, S&S shifts its focus from harvesting logs to processing them into lumber; the missing Pihl cutter emerges safely from the forest after a site-wide manhunt; Austin, Rygaard's new hire, finds his new bosses to be particularly hard taskmasters; Ron, the new junior pilot at Conner, faces rough weather on his first day of work; Browning keeps running into mechanical breakdowns at every turn.
25	10	"Clash of the Titans"	May 11, 2009
Jay takes part of the Browning crew to a new site, leaving Jesse to wrap up the current job; rising river levels threaten to swamp the S&S equipment; flaring tempers among the Pihl men force Mike to intervene before they attack a rotted 20-story tree; Ron shows promise during a windy, snowy second day on the job at Conner; Austin barely escapes serious injury as Rygaard sets up at a new site and tries to keep out-producing Browning.
26	11	"The Reckoning: Part 1"	May 18, 2009
Note: "The Reckoning: Part 1" and "The Reckoning: Part 2" were originally aired as a two-hour season finale. Browning moves to another job site, but a skyline malfunction hampers production; Austin climbs a tree to rig Rygaard's last skyline, then gets his first practice at cutting one down; Mike pushes the Pihl crew to move loads, but morale sinks rapidly and Dustin loses his temper; Bart lifts off to help Conner finish its last job, but damage to the helicopter sling line slows him down.
27	12	"The Reckoning: Part 2"	May 18, 2009
Note: "The Reckoning: Part 1" and "The Reckoning: Part 2" were originally aired as a two-hour season finale. Dustin quits Pihl, fed up with Mike's haranguing, and Dwayne soon does likewise; Conner scrambles to pull the loads needed to meet its last deadline; a dead head ruptures the S&S barge's hull, forcing Jimmy and James to dock it quickly; Browning stalls when a truck loaded with logs overturns on the site's only access road; a massive winter storm shuts down Browning and Pihl one day early, but Rygaard is spared and can keep moving wood off the mountain.

Season 2 final load counts:

- Rygaard – 690
- Browning – 677
- Pihl – 442
- Conner – 405
- S&S – 8

=== Season 3 (2010) ===
No. overall	No. in season	Title	Original release date
28	1	"Ax to Grind"	January 10, 2010
Rygaard brings in Travis and Dave, two new crew members, and sets up for its biggest, most ambitious job ever; Stump-Branch owner Melvin Lardy signs on to help Pihl get a fast start; the Browning crew begins its season with Jay supervising the site and Jesse in charge of business operations; Swamp Man heads out onto the Louisiana bayou in search of valuable sunken timber.
29	2	"Deeper into the Swamp"	January 17, 2010
A remote sawmill holds the promise of a big payoff for Swamp Man if they can get in and out safely; Craig and Gabe start to lose patience with the Rygaard greenhorns' safety lapses; Browning puts a new man on yarder duty, then brings out an even larger yarder for the next job; high temperatures put the Pihl crew and machinery in danger, while Leland, their previous yarder operator, takes Melvin's place.
30	3	"Diving for Dollars"	January 24, 2010
Browning races to set up its skyline and start the new job, but the fast pace may lead to disaster; truck breakdowns leave S&S scrambling for a way to get to Florida so they can start with Collins on time; Melvin faces the ire of the Pihl crew when the yarder breaks down on his watch; Rygaard pushes through a heavy storm to keep moving loads, only for a snapped skyline cable to threaten production.
31	4	"Boiling Point"	January 31, 2010
Jimmy and James make their first dives in the Suwannee as part of the Collins crew; Melvin has to prove himself against Leland if he wants to stay on yarder duty at Pihl;Travis and Dave face increased scrutiny from Craig and Gabe as they compete for a full-time spot with Rygaard; the Browning riggers fight both the heat and a log that crashes down toward them after a careless error at the yarder.
32	5	"Surviving the Swarm"	February 14, 2010
Sightings of alligators in the Suwannee make Jimmy's next dive for Collins extremely risky; Melvin's drive to finish the current Pihl job leads to an injury; a special order sends Swamp Man into bayou territory choked by hurricane debris; Craig and Gabe put the Rygaard greenhorns to a new test by assigning them to rigging duty; one safety incident at Browning is followed by another when Jay sustains dozens of bee stings and suddenly passes out.
33	6	"Showdown"	February 21, 2010
Melvin shows up late for the new Pihl job, then gets into arguments with the crew and storms off the site; Jay checks himself into the emergency room after the bee attack, but soon returns to the Browning job; Joe starts to run out of patience as Jimmy and James struggle to work together and find marketable logs for Collins; at Rygaard, a minor injury to Travis' hand results in Dave being sent home for the day, while Travis tries to work through his injury.
34	7	"Chopping Block"	February 28, 2010
Travis fails to show up for work, leading to a heated confrontation with Gabe and his resignation from Rygaard, while Dave must prove himself in the rigging; Shelby ventures into alligator-infested waters in search of prize timber for Swamp Man; Melvin is put on rigging duty to try to settle his differences with the Pihl crew, but gets into more arguments and quits; Jay's frustration boils over when damage to the skyline idles the Browning crew; a rough day at Collins results in Jimmy being sidelined as Joe puts James and one of the younger crew members temporarily in charge. (Final episode of the season to feature Pihl Logging.)
35	8	"Assault by Air"	March 7, 2010
Conner starts clearing a patch of timber infested by bark beetles in order to save the rest of the forest; Browning tries a makeshift repair on the damaged skyline to keep production going, but broken chokers slow the crew down; Jimmy and James set out on their own to find logs for Collins, with more success than in previous weeks; Swamp Man makes a nighttime search for a huge log, while the film crew following the company finds itself stranded in the swamp; the fast pace and crowded landing at the Rygaard site touch off an avalanche of logs that nearly crushes Dave.
36	9	"Crash and Burn"	March 14, 2010
Conner's ground crew dodges turns of logs as they swing out of control and break loose, damaging the helicopter; a near-collision between the Collins boats and an alligator sighting send everyone home for the day; Jay puts the Browning crew to work placing logs in dry stream beds to improve breeding grounds for salmon; Dave gets his first practice on a chainsaw while Gabe hurries to clear a new landing at the Rygaard site; as Swamp Man hauls a load of logs to a meeting with a buyer, a collision with a dock leaves Shelby scrambling to reel his cargo back in.
37	10	"Curse of Kalina"	March 21, 2010
Collins calls in a professional alligator hunter to bring down the huge gator that has stalled production; Dave's mistakes on the job and failure to report in on time may put his future with Rygaard in jeopardy; a giant submerged cypress could mean a huge payday for Swamp Man, if Shelby can break it loose and outrun an approaching storm; Browning pushes through a swarm of hornets and a tangle of widow-maker debris to finish its current job; in Conner's search for a new junior pilot, Bart takes two candidates, Josh and Kevin, up to evaluate their flying skills.
38	11	"End of the Line"	April 4, 2010
Dave persuades Gabe to give him one last chance at Rygaard, but a careless error puts Craig on the verge of firing him; Jimmy's desperate decision to snatch a log already marked by the other Collins crew has Joe questioning his ethics; Swamp Man tries to pull a massive log from Lake Pontchartrain and stay ahead of both a fierce storm and a buyer's deadline; Josh and Kevin get their first practice at dropping cargo to the Conner ground crew; as Browning pulls in the last loads from its current job, Jay tells the crew that he has no new work lined up and must send them home.
39	12	"Eleventh Hour"	April 11, 2010
Craig storms off the Rygaard site and Dave fails to show up, leaving Gabe to manage a shorthanded crew alone; after Jimmy's log-poaching last week, James goes out on the Suwannee by himself to hunt timber with Collins' other crew; when Jesse secures a new job for Browning, Jay brings in every available crew member to put wood on the ground; as Swamp Man makes a second try for the huge log stuck in Lake Pontchartrain, Shelby's old hernia flares up and sends him to the hospital; Josh and Kevin each make an actual heli-logging run, after which Bart evaluates their performance and hires Josh to fly for Conner.
40	13	"King of the Mountain"	April 18, 2010
Shelby sneaks out of the hospital so Swamp Man can try one last time to haul in the log from Lake Pontchartrain; as Browning sprints toward the end of its last job, trouble with the yarder threatens to halt production; Bart and the Conner crew sprint to stay ahead of an incoming thunderstorm; Joe finally loses his patience with Jimmy and fires him, but offers James a chance to go to work for Collins; Craig and Dave return to help Rygaard finish out its season with a risky all-night downhill logging session in the fog.

Season 3 final load counts:

- Browning – 1,185
- Rygaard – 1,182
- Pihl – 394 (at end of "Chopping Block")

=== Season 4 (2010–11) ===
No. overall	No. in season	Title	Original release date
41	1	"Alaska"	December 12, 2010
Gabe leads Rygaard into a troublesome mountain site, using a powerful new yarder that poses its own set of challenges; Pihl brings in Leah, its first female greenhorn, in hopes of fostering civility between the crew members; Papac races to build an access road on Suemez Island in Alaska so heavy equipment can move in for the start of its first job; at the height of alligator mating season, Swamp Man hires an assistant to help bring up a huge load of sunken timber from the bayou; after a rough start trying to find logs for Collins in the Suwannee, James gets a surprise visit from Jimmy.
42	2	"Sink or Swim"	December 19, 2010
An accident damages the Rygaard yarder, followed by a second one that leaves Craig and Gabe wondering about their yarder operator's capabilities; Jimmy persuades James to rejoin S&S and challenges Collins to a logging contest; as Papac begins pulling logs, problems with the skyline lead to heated arguments and the hook tender's resignation; after Swamp Man's first attempt to retrieve the huge sunken log fails, Shelby tries to break it loose with explosives.
43	3	"Day from Hell"	December 26, 2010
The disappearance of Papac's log yard operator sparks a full-scale manhunt across Suemez; Swamp Man calls in help to rig heavy explosive charges in hopes of loosening the sunken log; with bad weather moving in, Pihl races to keep up production and Leah's skills at setting chokers are put to the test; mechanical problems put S&S out of action as Collins' diver risks being run over by a passing boat; Dave's late arrival on the Rygaard site has Craig and Gabe fuming, and Gabe warns him that he has one last chance to prove that he deserves to keep his job.
44	4	"Manhunt"	January 2, 2011
The Papac crews resume their search across Suemez, this time with air support, and eventually find their missing coworker unharmed; alligators and darkness complicate Swamp Man's efforts to pull in logs for quick cash so Shelby can take his dog to a veterinarian; at the new Rygaard site, Gabe's attempt to string the skyline with a helicopter goes wrong and leaves him scrambling in the brush; with the Suwannee lowered by drought, Collins has no trouble finding logs, while S&S's first strike threatens to sink their boat; Leah keeps working to gain the Pihl crew's respect as their rigging slinger gets hurt on the last stretch of the current job.
45	5	"Battle for Survival"	January 9, 2011
Tension following the Suemez manhunt drives Papac's site boss to quit, while a boat breakdown strands half the crew on the mainland for the day; at the Rygaard site, Craig takes charge in Gabe's absence and Dave suffers an ankle injury that leaves him out of action for a week; Pihl's rigging slinger is in the hospital due to his injury, so his brother comes over from Browning to help clear a swampy stretch of timber; holiday crowding on the Suwannee leads Collins to suspend its operations, but S&S takes the risk to find more wood; Swamp Man scrambles to keep ahead of an incoming storm and bring up logs to pay the vet bills.
46	6	"Judgment Day"	January 16, 2011
Papac's replacement yarder operator puts the equipment and crew at risk, prompting the new site boss to bring the regular man back in; while helping to set up the new Pihl site, Leah unexpectedly quits to resume her previous job as a forest firefighter; an equipment breakdown nearly kills Rygaard's yarder operator as Gabe counsels Dave to stand up for himself; Shelby takes his dog in for a checkup, then gets a special Swamp Man order and runs into a well-armed fellow logger; flaring tempers and invading snakes drive S&S off the Suwannee, while Collins scores a load of logs just in time to avoid a storm that temporarily strands their film crew.
47	7	"Under Fire"	January 23, 2011
After Shelby and his cousin play a practical joke on the Swamp Man buyer, he fills the rush order and muscles through a shallow swamp to complete another one; Papac races to finish its current job, forcing the crew to make a series of risky moves that eventually leave them idle for the day; Collins deals with a winch breakdown, while S&S takes its boat in for repairs and Jimmy's temper leads him and James to come to blows; Gabe must saw apart several logs that have fallen off a Rygaard truck, and the crew battles soaring temperatures at a new site.
48	8	"Overboard"	January 30, 2011
Dave's mistakes in skyline repair and choker work turn Craig and the entire Rygaard crew against him; Papac's former hook tender returns, demoted to the rigging crew, and butts heads with his replacement; Dustin Dethlefs, formerly of Pihl, joins Olson Marine and faces the challenges of corralling thousands of floating logs for water transport; after the argument with James, Jimmy sets out alone to find logs for S&S, but with much less luck than Collins; Jacob, the new Pihl greenhorn, faces hazing by the crew and helps stop an exhaust leak into the yarder cab that threatens the day's operations.
49	9	"Lock & Load"	February 13, 2011
Dustin and the Olson crew hurry to pull in Papac's logs after they start to break loose from the tugboat; hoping to drive Dave out of Rygaard, Craig secretly hires DJ, a former Browning crew member, to Gabe's extreme annoyance; Jimmy and James reconcile and fit a sonar system onto the S&S boat so they can more easily find logs in the Suwannee and keep pace with Collins; Papac faces a tight schedule for moving its equipment off Suemez before the tide goes out; Swamp Man takes a break from logging to hunt snapping turtles for dinner; as Pihl tackles a site filled with damaged timber, the yarder's transmission fails and the skyline carriage knocks down several trees.
50	10	"Fallout Zone"	February 20, 2011
Swamp Man makes a night run into an alligator-infested bayou to find sunken logs, then returns during the day to bring up a large one; the S&S sonar system allows Jimmy and James to keep pulling logs at a quick pace; once Collins sets up its own sonar, Joe leaps in to free his diver from a tangle of underwater fishing lines; as DJ and Dave try to outdo each other on the Rygaard landing, Gabe's strategy of cutting trees near the skyline puts the crew in danger; at Papac's new job site on Prince of Wales Island, they bring in a bigger, more powerful yarder dubbed "The Tower of Power", but Joe's error securing one of the guylines and the weight of the huge trees brings the skyline down on the rigging crew.
51	11	"Tipping Point"	February 27, 2011
Jimmy dislocates his shoulder during a weekend shift, then gets into a shouting match with James that ends S&S' day early; a heated confrontation between Dave and DJ leads Craig to walk off the Rygaard job and Gabe to consider firing him; a giant log Shelby first spotted as a child is so heavy and oddly positioned that it overturns Swamp Man's winch barge; the collapse of the tail hold tree at Papac's job sparks a fight between its hook tender and rigging slinger; on the last section of Pihl's job, the skyline frays and breaks, throwing the crew into panic when one man goes missing.
52	12	"King of the Hill"	March 6, 2011
Pihl's missing man is found safe after the skyline break, but the carriage has taken enough damage in the fall to end their season; Swamp Man puts a long-disused swamp buggy back into service in order to start pulling logs again; Browning sets up for quick production at an Oregon job, with Jesse in charge of the crew following the death of his stepdaughter; with Jimmy sidelined due to his shoulder, James hires a temporary deckhand for S&S, then suffers a head injury during a dive; after an overweight turn of logs bends the Rygaard yarder's support tower, the crew works late to straighten it and Dave misses his son's birthday. (First episode of the season to feature J.M. Browning Logging; last to feature Pihl Logging.)
53	13	"Fraying at the Edges"	March 13, 2011
Shelby's shallow-water test runs with the swamp buggy put Swamp Man back in business until he runs over his own house trailer; as Lemare sets up on Vancouver Island, damage to the yarder carriage forces the crew to resort to grapple logging, a tactic that backfires badly; Browning's quick pace causes a pileup on the landing that sends logs sliding down the hill toward the rigging crew; after Collins' sonar malfunctions, Joe resorts to experience and instinct to find logs in the Suwannee; squabbling among the Papac crew slows down production, forcing Mike to intervene with a tree-cutting challenge. (First episode of the season to feature Lemare Lake Logging.)
54	14	"This Means War"	March 20, 2011
Lemare's mechanic jury-rigs the skyline carriage, but the repair job fails and sends the crew back to grapple logging; Swamp Man targets a massive log that puts both the buggy and Shelby's safety at risk; Dave's late arrival at the Rygaard site and faulty cable-splicing escalate into a confrontation with Craig that sends him home; Jimmy returns to work at S&S, but James gets caught in some underwater deadwood during a dive; taking his first dive in over a year, Joe soon finds a fresh payload for Collins that needs some creative loosening; a drooping skyline threatens to bring down either Browning's production target or its rigging crew.
55	15	"The Mouth from the South"	April 3, 2011
An inexperienced spotter quits Lemare after causing a near-miss accident and arguing with the landing crew; S&S' deckhand quits when a communication problem with Jimmy and James puts his safety at risk; Shelby battles a stubborn log while taking a Swamp Man buyer's talkative girlfriend on a tour of the swamp; Papac pulls logs across an access road, nearly smashing a passing truck in the process; Collins targets a log that cost Joe's friend a finger two years earlier; the ongoing conflict between Craig and Dave drives Gabe to call an emergency Rygaard meeting.
56	16	"Blast Off"	April 10, 2011
Shelby takes his wife Donna along to help bring in a special order for Swamp Man; Rygaard starts a big job that requires every available man, including Dave, but a dropped skyline carriage causes a near-miss accident; Lemare's road crew blasts bedrock to make enough gravel to re-pave the storm-damaged roads for its log trucks; S&S struggles to find timber in shallow water as a stuck log sinks Collins' boat; Jay steps in to help the Browning rigging crew bring down a tree that sits too close to the skyline.
57	17	"Man Down"	April 17, 2011
While filling in on yarder duty, Papac's rigging slinger pulls out the skyline's tail hold on a heavy turn; Shelby fights equipment malfunctions to retrieve a pile of sunken logs for Swamp Man; Garry, the new hire at Lemare, crushes his chainsaw while cutting trees and has to work in the rigging; Dave's inexperience with the chainsaw ruins a valuable log for Rygaard before the loader knocks Craig down; Collins resumes logging with an old boat that starts to sink almost as soon as it enters the Suwannee; Jimmy re-injures his shoulder but keeps working to help bring up a fresh load for S&S.
58	18	"Final Countdown"	April 24, 2011
With both of its boats sunk, Collins is out of action on the Suwannee; Joe accuses S&S of stealing two logs from him, prompting Jimmy to challenge him to a fight; Shelby is bitten by a poisonous water moccasin, but fights the pain to bring in timber for Swamp Man; Garry is called in to saw an enormous log apart as Lemare rushes to finish its job before winter storms move in; Browning's riggers sort out a challenging tangle of logs as Jay starts into the final stretch of the job; Dave is sent down to the Rygaard rigging crew, where a log nearly crushes him.
59	19	"Fever Pitch"	May 1, 2011
Papac mounts a brute-force push to haul in massive logs; DJ has an accident on the Rygaard yarder, then walks off the site after an angry face-off with Craig; after making a big sale, Shelby heads out to salvage the overturned Swamp Man barge; Jay learns that he will soon need hip replacement surgery that may end his career in the field with Browning; Joe takes back the two disputed logs as Jimmy and James mark the ones they have pulled in for S&S.
60	20	"Down to the Wire"	May 8, 2011
Mike fires Papac's fill-in yarder operator after a brawl on the last day of the season, then steps in to replace him; Jay and Jesse work side by side to help Browning produce at top speed and finish its season; DJ's departure and a collapsed tail hold tree put pressure on Dave to help Rygaard bring in its final loads; Shelby brings up the Swamp Man barge, but finds that it will need extensive repair in the off-season; Jimmy storms off, leaving James to deal with a buyer ready to assess the value of S&S' and Collins' hauls; Lemare wraps up its job and loads the timber onto barges for transport to the mills.

Season 4 final load counts:

- Papac – 1,994
- Rygaard – 1,986
- Lemare – 1,642
- Browning – 1,141

Results of the Collins/S&S contest:

- Collins – 26 logs, $7,800 sale proceeds
- S&S – 23 logs, $22,960 sale proceeds

=== Season 5 (2012) ===
No. overall	No. in season	Title	Original release date
61	1	"Ax is Back"	January 8, 2012
Steep cliffs and skyline/rigging problems provoke Coatsy, Papac's site boss, into assaulting a landing man at an unforgiving job site; the Rygaard crew plows into a blowdown site choked with years' worth of fallen trees and loose rocks; Shelby scouts the bayou to find logs for Swamp Man, but a boating accident puts his assistant out of action; using a 30-year-old yarder that has been out of service for years, Big Gun starts into its first job only to have an anchor line break; Jimmy and James argue their way to a new stretch of the Suwannee, then bet the S&S boat against Uncle Buck's on a season-long logging contest.
62	2	"Damage Control"	January 15, 2012
Mike Pihl puts pressure on Big Gun to get back on schedule after the yarder line break, and sends his son Danny to help out; after Jimmy leaves James on the banks of the Suwannee, Jimmy works alone to find logs for S&S and Uncle Buck picks James up; Swamp Man tears up a client's boat dock while trying to pull a fallen log away from it, leading Shelby to fire his newly hired assistant; Mike Papac re-hires Joe, a former hook tender and rival of Coatsy, to help defuse the tension between Coatsy and the Papac crew; Gabe accidentally drops a tree on Dave's truck while showing him how to cut trees for Rygaard.
63	3	"No Pain, No Gain"	January 22, 2012
With a newly hired assistant, Nikki, S&S makes a $500 bet against Uncle Buck for the most logs found in one day; Shelby and Donna call in backup to fill special Swamp Man orders so they can pay hospital and repair bills; as Big Gun fights a yarder breakdown and Danny starts to work, Levi visits the hospital and learns that he may have contracted tuberculosis; on his first shift as Rygaard's rigging slinger, Dave sends a wrong signal that leads to a smashed chainsaw; under pressure from Coatsy to keep up with the yarder's pace, a chaser on the Papac landing slips and injures his leg and back.
64	4	"Hell Hole"	January 29, 2012
An injury sends Swamp Man's latest assistant to the hospital and leaves Shelby to cut his way to a massive tree alone; Nikki voices her growing distaste for Jimmy and her doubts about S&S' ability to find logs so she can be paid; Swilley gets lost in an underwater cavern while hunting logs for Uncle Buck; Coatsy is forced to put Joe on yarder duty after the regular operator storms off the Papac site; Big Gun's communication system develops problems that lead to a dropped skyline carriage and a broken chainsaw; after Dave is nearly hit by a log on the Rygaard landing, he tries to leave but is called back by Gabe to help with a risky skyline move.
65	5	"Cowboy Up"	February 12, 2012
Shelby calls in a group of voodoo practitioners to dispel a curse he believes is on the Swamp Man boat, then targets a huge cypress stump; Levi returns to help Big Gun finish out its current job, but a snapped cable forces the crew to improvise a solution; as the Rygaard crew works a site with clifftop landing in thick fog, near-miss accidents and a wrecked truck set the crew on edge; Siderius Logging gets a fast but risky start on its biggest job to date in Montana's Rocky Mountains; Nikki gets fed up with S&S and leaves, while Uncle Buck trawls shallow waters in search of easy logs. (First episode of the season to feature Siderius Logging.)
66	6	"Fists of Fury"	February 19, 2012
Swamp Man faces tough challenges in cutting and moving the giant tree Shelby spotted two weeks earlier; Coatsy accidentally uproots a tail hold while filling in on loader duty at Papac; Uncle Buck fixes the improper mounting of S&S's new boat engine, then wagers a dinner on the day's log count; after a falling tree barely misses Dave, he loses his temper and assaults Fernando, Rygaard's rigging slinger; Siderius' push to bring in logs causes a cable to snap, idling the crew as new hire Jesse starts work.
67	7	"Wake-Up Call"	February 26, 2012
After Gabe separates Dave and Fernando, an uprooted tree nearly crushes Fernando, prompting Dave to rethink his animosity; Shelby and his cousin venture into an alligator-infested swamp to fill a special order for Swamp Man and catch frogs for dinner; Travis, another recent hire at Siderius, learns about tree-cutting on the fly as he faces a dangerous leaner; Joe gets promoted to full-time yarder duty at Papac, but a new man on the landing and a string of tricky logs stand between him and a raise; Jimmy throws James off the S&S boat, then struggles to bring up a tangle of logs by himself until Uncle Buck brings James back.
68	8	"Out of Control"	March 4, 2012
When a back injury puts Danny out of action on Big Gun's new job, Levi starts trying out two greenhorns, Josh and Ryan; turns of massive logs bring a widow maker down on the Papac camera crew and threaten to rip out the new tail hold; Shelby and another cousin fight bumblebees and underwater wildlife in search of valuable timber for Swamp Man's latest order; after Rygaard's heavy-duty carriage breaks loose and hurtles all the way down the skyline, Gabe gets in an argument with Craig and storms off the site; Jimmy kicks James off the S&S boat again and works alone while dodging speedboating locals; as Uncle Buck chases down the pieces of a 300-year-old sunken raft, Swilley gets pinned at the bottom of the Suwannee.
69	9	"Rygaard vs. Rygaard"	March 11, 2012
Jimmy and James meet with an anger management counselor, but end up pushing him off the S&S boat as old arguments flare up; Shelby and his cousin Belinda hurry to beat the weather and pull cypress logs from Lake Pontchartrain for Swamp Man; Craig and Gabe run separate yarders at the Rygaard site, increasing production until both crews try to pull in the same log and a choker breaks; Ryan's mistake on the landing nearly causes an accident for the Big Gun crew, but redeems himself by figuring a way to lift logs over the rough terrain; while starting on a 40-log special order, H.H. Horse relies on a pulling team to bring down a dangerous leaner. (First episode of the season to feature H.H. Horse Logging.)
70	10	"Down & Dirty"	March 18, 2012
At Rygaard, Dave's attempt to pull in a huge log brings down a tangle of blowdown trees and earns a tongue-lashing from Gabe; a broken winch leaves Shelby arguing with Belinda and improvising to find a way to fill Swamp Man's latest order; Jesse has trouble setting up Siderius' new skyline, then causes a dangerous upender while working in the rigging; Jimmy hires local diver Brad to work for S&S and teach James, who instead becomes frustrated and quits; H.H. Horse brings in the strongest horse in its stable to help move an enormous log.
71	11	"Let 'Er Rip"	March 25, 2012
A rival logger in Swamp Man's territory shoots at the boat with a bow and arrow; Brad quickly finds logs for S&S, then takes a risky dive in search of a huge one deep in the mud; after one Papac crew member damages Mike's truck, another suffers a broken hand when a log slides off the landing; Jagger is hoisted into a 100-foot tree to help H.H. Horse bring it down without damaging a nearby trailer; as Siderius wrestles with heavy logs on a low skyline, Jesse faces the challenge of climbing a tree to set a new anchor point.
72	12	"Burning the Bear"	April 1, 2012
Levi fires Josh from Big Gun after his performance slips and he brings personal arguments onto the site; Craig has to move fast with the loader to keep logs from sliding off the Rygaard landing, but one breaks loose and nearly hits Fernando; Shelby's rival confronts Swamp Man again, leading to a tense standoff until the other man reveals himself as Shelby's cousin Richard; Brad keeps finding logs for S&S as Uncle Buck's engine catches fire, crippling the boat and singeing Swilley; after Joe pushes through nerves to help Papac finish its job, he and Coatsy make peace and Coatsy hires a new man for the rigging crew.
73	13	"Where's Willy?"	April 8, 2012
Shelby's dog goes missing in alligator territory as Swamp Man explores an old logging canal; at Rygaard, a broken chainsaw and squabbles among Gabe's crew lead him to shut down for the day; as Papac sets up for downhill logging on a new site, a recently hired chaser argues and fights with Joe; after Swilley ruptures an eardrum during a dive, Uncle Buck enlists James as a temporary replacement; a bout of pre-diving horseplay between Uncle Buck and S&S leaves Brad with a possible broken foot; in a race to finish its current job, Big Gun resorts to jammer logging on a steep portion of the site.
74	14	"Falling Apart"	April 22, 2012
Mistakes by both Rygaard crews complicate a race to set up a new skyline, with $500 at stake for the winner; an assistant's injured finger and an impatient buyer leave Shelby with little time to fill Swamp Man's order; Big Gun sets up for downhill logging on a new site, calling in Pihl yarder operator Leland to help out; James' first dive for Uncle Buck pays off, while Brad's injury turns out to be a severe sprain that sidelines him from S&S for the time being; after a productive day, the Papac crew relaxes with a fishing trip and Mike offers $500 for the biggest fish.
75	15	"Up in Flames"	April 22, 2012
At the Big Gun site, Leland's speedy pace on the yarder knocks a boulder loose that smashes into a pickup truck; Shelby fixes the Swamp Man winch barge and targets the log that flipped it in Season 4; Jimmy takes Brad's place diving for S&S, but his fear of alligators forces him out of the water; Gabe's yarder has a season-ending breakdown, leaving Rygaard without a spare machine; faulty brakes send the Siderius skyline carriage into the repair shop, so the crew goes downhill to cut trees and give Jesse a lesson in using a chainsaw.
76	16	"Family Rivalry"	April 29, 2012
Swamp Man brings in extra manpower and equipment to wrestle the huge log onto dry land; old arguments flare up among the Rygaard crew, forcing Gabe to step in as they try to finish the current site; a local landowner splits a job between Wheeler and Willett as a competition for future work, with Willett being the first to get a load out; James and Brad both struggle with their equipment, testing the patience of S&S and Uncle Buck; when Joe's fast yarding causes the Papac tail hold tree to collapse, he climbs a new one himself to hook up the cables. (First episode of the season to feature Wheeler Logging and Willett Logging.)
77	17	"Swamp Gold"	May 6, 2012
Swamp Man finds an alligator gar guarding a potential sunken raft of huge logs that could tip the forklift; with Jimmy unable to work after his injury, James takes charge of S&S and butts heads with Brad, who finds a log that threatens to sink the boat; after a morning of arguments, Craig makes peace with the Rygaard crew and has them pull a prank on Dave, who angrily walks off the site; as Wheeler's new hire Sam quits due to Barry's nonstop haranguing, equipment breakdowns and arguments slow Willett down.
78	18	"Up in Smoke"	May 13, 2012
When the S&S/Uncle Buck logging contest ends in a tie, the crews extend it for one more day and start playing dirty; Swamp Man finds more logs from the sunken raft, then has to muscle them back to shore for a meeting with the buyer; Ryan's use of the wrong fuel temporarily disables Big Gun's powerful carriage and stalls their drive to finish the current job; Siderius celebrates the end of their job and season after Jesse helps with a cable repair to bring in one last, giant log; Sam returns to help Wheeler finish out the competition as Willett dynamites a fallen tree blocking the oxen's path; although Willett wins, the two crews decide to work together on future jobs.
79	19	"Betting It All"	May 20, 2012
As a fill-in loader operator struggles to move logs on the Rygaard landing, the crew gets fed up with Dave's slow pace; Coatsy splits the Papac rigging crew to speed up production, but a tumbling log rattles Joe so badly that he walks off; the Swamp Man buyer, eager to have the rest of the missing log raft, calls in a helicopter pilot to help Shelby search for it; Uncle Buck relies on two divers and a damaged winch during sudden death, while Jimmy resumes arguing with James and fires him from S&S; the day again ends in a tie, so the crews decide to settle their wager with a log buyer's appraisal. Results of the contest: S&S – $6,000; Uncle Buck – $9,000; Following the appraisal, Jimmy storms off and James rams the S&S boat into Uncle Buck's.
80	20	"The Ax Stops Here"	May 20, 2012
After Uncle Buck offers to hire Brad away from S&S, Jimmy and James sneak down to the dock and take their boat back; Swamp Man's hunt for the rest of the raft turns up a massive log that proves to be worthless, but Shelby vows to keep looking; during Big Gun's push to finish their job by day's end and earn a bonus, a dropped turn of logs nearly flattens Levi's brother; faced with an ultimatum from Craig, Gabe fires Dave from Rygaard just before the final push to bring in wood; Coatsy tries to run the Papac yarder, but his inexperience slows the crew badly until Joe returns.

'Season 5 final load counts:

- Rygaard – 2,231
- Papac – 2,229
- Big Gun – 1,189
- Siderius – 748

=== Season 6 (2012–13) ===
No. overall	No. in season	Title	Original release date
81	1	"All or Nothing"	December 9, 2012
Bad weather on Lake Pontchartrain puts Swamp Man's equipment and Shelby's family at risk as he resumes his search for the valuable log raft he tried to find in Season 5; rehired by Gabe without Craig's knowledge, DJ crushes his chainsaw while cutting down a tree on Rygaard's first job site; the boggy terrain on Papac's first site nearly swallows Joe as he and Coatsy scout the area; James takes charge of the S&S boat due to Jimmy's fight with cancer, but starts arguing with Brad as they set up to log the Withlacoochee River in North Florida. Note: This episode was dedicated to Jimmy Smith who died on November 1, 2012.
82	2	"We're Not Alone"	December 16, 2012
James calls in Swilley to help S&S get started, but finds that the boat has drifted down the river; rival company Dreadknots finds and returns it, then challenges S&S to a two-month logging contest for rights to work the Withlacoochee; Jimmy's doctor tells him and James that he may have as little as six months to live if he does not respond to treatment; after DJ's return to Rygaard sparks a heated confrontation with Craig, he struggles to work on a steep slope that contains a hole 40 feet deep and is knocked down by a turn of logs; Shelby and his niece Stephanie hurry to pull a valuable log from a wasp-infested bayou before they are overrun; Joe's rush to get the Papac yarder going causes several near misses with falling debris and swinging chokers.
83	3	"Sabotage"	December 23, 2012
DJ assaults Rygaard rigging crew member Moe, blaming him for the knockdown accident, and Moe retaliates by framing DJ for setting a choker that damages the log processor; Shelby finds a half-buried log for Swamp Man, but digging it out tests the patience of both Stephanie and Belinda; Dreadknots gets a fast start to the day, finding a log so heavy that it threatens to tip their boat; Brad and Swilley have growing doubts about James' ability to lead S&S, due to forgotten equipment and a stalled boat motor; Joe storms off the Papac site after his fast yarding knocks a stump loose that causes a rigging man to suffer an injury dodging it.
84	4	"Put Up or Shut Up"	December 30, 2012
A broken hose on the swamp buggy's water pump hinders Swamp Man's efforts to free a large log half-buried in the muck; despite Gabe's attempt to intervene, a prank by the Rygaard rigging crew leads DJ to get into a fight with them; reassigned to the rigging crew by Coatsy, Joe clashes with the choker setters and then climbs a tree to cut a section that threatens to fall on them; the Dreadknots boat's winch activates unexpectedly while Dave is underwater checking on a stuck log, pinning him beneath it; Jimmy urges James to take charge of the S&S crew.
85	5	"Cage Match"	January 6, 2013
Shelby and Belinda go on a frustrating fishing trip to catch crawfish for Shelby's wedding anniversary; after an old rival steals two of Dreadknots' logs, the crew takes them back amid threats from the armed thief; growing hostilities on the Rygaard landing erupt into a physical altercation between DJ and Craig; James brings together the S&S crew and old rival "Uncle" Buck Livingston to take Jimmy for a ride on the Withlacoochee; Papac finishes its current job one day early, but Mike lays off the crew since he has no new work lined up for the moment. (Final episode of the season to feature Papac Alaska Logging.)
86	6	"Flipping Logzilla"	January 13, 2013
Strong water currents, tangled debris, and Shelby's cousin/rival Richard stand between Swamp Man and a valuable cypress stump; Brad and Swilley skid on a wet road, overturning and damaging the S&S boat, and try to get it repaired without James finding out; Jimmy's former boss/rival Joe Collins stops by for a visit; Lemare returns to an unfinished job site from Season 4, but a series of mistakes by rigging crew member Turtle forces them to shut down early; Gabe warns DJ to stay away from Craig, then brings his young son to the Rygaard site as a morale booster. (First episode of the season to feature Lemare Lake Logging.)
87	7	"Rock Slide"	January 20, 2013
The Rygaard crew decides to stop work early against Gabe's orders, causing him to fly into a rage and order them back to work; the S&S boat is repaired, but James' frustration at the season's poor showing leads him to attack Swilley and drive off; equipment breakdowns and road hazards put Swamp Man to the test as Shelby and Belinda hurry to bring in the cypress stump for a buyer; Turtle must climb to the top of a steep rockslide site in order to help set up Lemare's next skyline.
88	8	"Shelby's New Toy"	January 27, 2013
Shelby buys a paddle barge and track hoe for Swamp Man, but gets a few surprises concerning maintenance and operation; returning to Rygaard after taking time off, DJ falls off a log and sustains a possible broken ankle; Wisconsin Woodchuck starts taking apart the Globe Elevator, but the deteriorating structure and a crane breakdown put the crew out of action for the day; after Dreadknots finds a log, the boat's motor cuts out and Dave has to tow it back to the dock by swimming two miles; while Brad and Swilley go in search of logs for S&S, Jimmy calls in a psychologist to meet with James. (First episode of the season to feature Wisconsin Woodchuck.)
89	9	"Gators and Hand Grenades"	February 10, 2013
Shelby scrambles to get Swamp Man's new paddle barge and track hoe onto the river without sinking them and uses a dummy grenade to play a prank on Donna; Clint makes a risky nighttime dive to bring up a pair of logs after boat repairs and an alligator sighting cost the Dreadknots crew an entire day; having only suffered a twisted ankle, DJ returns to work at Rygaard but finds Craig rebuffing his peace offerings; with Wisconsin Woodchuck behind schedule, Judy's brother Mike (the crew foreman) shocks her by riding down on an upper structure being lowered by the crane; as Swilley and Brad hunt logs for S&S, James walks out of a hospital visit with his grandmother and Jimmy; Papac crew members Joe and Coatsy are out of money, so Joe lines up some work for them in Montana.
90	10	"Goldmine"	February 17, 2013
Shelby finds a trove of sunken timbers near the Swamp Man barge's mooring spot and must keep Richard away from them; after logs start sliding off the Rygaard landing due to Craig's struggles with the log processor, he becomes frustrated and leaves the site; Joe and Coatsy have a week to clear a 10-acre stretch of dead trees for Joe's friend Steve in Montana, but must cut them down by hand due to the fire risk; as Wisconsin Woodchuck tries to bring down a rotted exterior wall, one section collapses and nearly buries a crew member; after one last visit from the S&S crew, Jimmy and James prepare to go home to Washington.
91	11	"The Hurricane Hits"	February 24, 2013
As Hurricane Isaac makes landfall on the Gulf Coast, Shelby races to secure the Swamp Man equipment and help his cousins trapped in their house; Brad and Swilley, now in charge of S&S, turn down Dreadknots' offer to cancel the logging contest, then suffer an electrical fire while hauling up a log; Joe and Coatsy race through the rest of their tree-clearing job, then get an offer from Steve for additional work; Mike quits Wisconsin Woodchuck when Judy blames him for the midair collapse of a structure that sends debris raining down on the crew; fed up with the Rygaard crew's bickering, Gabe fires the loader operator after he throws a truck trailer off the landing; with time running short on Lemare's current job, the crew's late arrival and a yarder-damaging mistake cause site boss Gord's patience to wear thin.
92	12	"Calling It Quits"	April 7, 2013
Shelby pushes through the storm to bring his cousins to safety, then learns of a possible dam collapse that may flood the Swamp Man camp a second time; as Craig settles back in at the controls of an older processor, DJ visits to say goodbye to the Rygaard crew before going in for surgery on his ankle; Judy struggles to lead the Wisconsin Woodchuck crew until Mike returns to the job, but their buyer's imminent arrival has everyone on edge; during a one-day, winner-take-all logging contest, S&S brings in Swilley's fisherman friend Snapper to help defeat Dreadknots; Gord's vocal annoyance at lost time on the Lemare site leads his hook tender to quit. (Final episode of the season to feature Wisconsin Woodchuck.)
93	13	"The Aftermath"	April 14, 2013
Swamp Man targets a massive log, hoping to donate the money from its sale to a cousin of Shelby's whose home was ruined by the storm; desperate to fill DJ's slot at Rygaard, Gabe re-hires former crew member Dave, angering Craig so much that he walks off the site; Big Gun yarder operator Stacey's mistakes with a recently purchased, older machine put the rigging crew in danger; empty air tanks leave S&S unable to dive, and a collision on the rocks sends the boat to the shop; Dreadknots warns the crew that they have violated environmental regulations; Joe accidentally knocks a tree down by backing a dump truck into it as he and Coatsy build a logging road. (First episode of the season to feature Big Gun Logging.)
94	14	"Unlucky Charm"	April 21, 2013
Belinda helps Shelby comb the swamp for usable items washed away from homes, then challenges him to a mud race for a day's pay; Dave gets a hostile reception from the Rygaard crew, and Craig walks off the site again, hinting to Gabe about his slowly growing frustration toward himself; new hire Jesse is put on whistle duty at Big Gun, but makes mistakes that lead to a crew member's injured finger; after Dave rips his overalls during a dive for Dreadknots, he buys a new pair and sends the old ones to the bottom of the river; Swampy comes along to help S&S again, but Brad and Swilley have no success finding logs.
95	15	"Slippery Slope"	April 28, 2013
Swamp Man chases hidden gold and pulls in a giant log from an old ferry landing, but the return trip leaves the boat's camera crew injured; Craig returns to the Rygaard site after talking with Gabe, then gives Dave a pie in the face to break the tension among the crew; Brad and Swilley find a pink prank played on the S&S boat by Dreadknots, deal with a broken winch, and lose their latest deckhand Monkey to a party on their rivals' boat; after Big Gun's yarder slips out of gear and lets a turn of logs slide back down the hill, Levi sends Stacey down to the rigging and takes his place; Coatsy begins to tire of free-lance work after a tree falls on the grapple skidder he and Joe are using to clear out a stand of beetle-infested timber.
96	16	"Hell or High Water"	May 5, 2013
Spiders, snakes, and receding floodwaters complicate Swamp Man's efforts to recover the last logs exposed by the hurricane; a tree Stacey is cutting sways in high winds and nearly falls on several Big Gun crew members, causing Levi to think about firing him; Lemare's new hook tender struggles to set up a tail hold and causes several broken cables, forcing the crew to shut down for the day; Brad enters an amateur MMA fight in order to get his trainer Rashuan to help on the S&S boat, racing against Dreadknots to chase down a lead on nearby sunken logs; the Rygaard crew finds ways to have fun on the job while keeping production high.
97	17	"The Final Straw"	May 12, 2013
Swamp Man pushes through alligators and strong currents in search of wood to help build a camp for people displaced by the hurricane; after a processor breakdown and a hectic day of logging, Craig surprises the Rygaard crew by announcing his decision to quit the business at season's end; Stacey volunteers to make a risky yarder move and run the machine so Big Gun can finish its job on time and secure another one; while hauling out a giant load for Lemare, Gord hits a parked pickup truck and then crushes it when the logs break away and fall on it. (Final episode of the season to feature Big Gun Logging.)
98	18	"Risking It All"	May 19, 2013
After wrapping up Swamp Man's camp wood order, Shelby and his assistant DaVi visit a dermatologist to get both DaVi's toenail fungus and a strange growth under Shelby's skin checked out; while hunting logs for S&S in a deep underwater cave, Brad gets lost and has to be rescued by Dreadknots; after the tail hold tree at Rygaard's new site tears loose under the strain of heavy turns, the crew takes the day off at the county fair and Craig is named "Logger of the Year"; Joe and Coatsy scramble to deliver a load of firewood by day's end, hoping to earn the money they need for a return trip to Alaska and a new Papac job.
99	19	"In Too Deep"	June 2, 2013
Swamp Man spends two nights chasing down new leads on the valuable sunken log raft; storms and arguments over empty air tanks have S&S ready to concede the logging contest; when James returns to the Withlacoochee and gets a disappointing progress report, Dreadknots offers to help S&S pull enough logs to cover Jimmy's medical bills; Gord sends the Lemare crew home early after their attempts to bring in logs cause a landslide on an unstable site; a short landing and big lumber send logs sliding downhill toward the Rygaard crew.
100	20	"Fight to the Finish Line"	June 2, 2013
Rygaard pushes to bring in at least 30 loads on the final day of the season; Gabe surprises Craig with a new saw-blade company sign to mark Craig's 45 years as a logger; Swamp Man calls in all hands to continue the search for the log raft, but a face-off with Richard and a track hoe breakdown frustrate Shelby again; after a rough start, S&S and Dreadknots quickly find several logs, then target a last huge one to meet their buyer's deadline; a log slides down the Lemare site, nearly crushing a man, and the crew must bring in a massive cedar to finish the job.

Season 6 final load counts:

- Rygaard – 2,147
- Lemare – 2,132

=== Season 7 (2013–14) ===
No. overall	No. in season	Title	Original release date
101	0	"Most Dangerous Cuts"	November 3, 2013
Note: The season has an introductory episode which increased the number to 21 episodes for the season and changed the season premiere to November 3, though the episode is not considered the first episode of the season. A look back at four crews from previous seasons (Rygaard, Swamp Man, Papac, Dreadknots) and their plans for the new one, as well as an introduction to three new crews (Oakes, Ax-Cut Timber, Chapman).
102	1	"Axes and Allies"	November 10, 2013
While retrieving logs for Swamp Man from Lake Pontchartrain, Shelby pulls up a submerged car and gets a surprise order, the biggest of his career; Gabe deals with dangerous and costly mistakes by his inexperienced crew as Rygaard sets up for its first job under his leadership; faced with a $250,000 order, Dreadknots hires Dave's cousin Katelyn and encounters a huge log buried in the riverbed; Chapman rejects Clint's offer to work together and proposes a logging contest, with the loser agreeing to work for the winner; while Papac prepares for a job on an island that other crews have tried and failed to log, a tree-cutting mistake leaves Coatsy wondering if he and Joe can safely work together. (Note: This episode was dedicated to the memory of Bart Colantuono, an R&R Conner pilot who was killed in a helicopter accident on September 16, 2013.)
103	2	"Pain in the Ax"	November 17, 2013
Craig gets his truck crushed by a swinging log during a visit to the Rygaard site, prompting Gabe to reluctantly ask his brother Jason for help; as Joe teaches Papac greenhorns Anthony and Jason to choke logs, a close call with a sliding log scares Anthony badly enough to make him quit; Shelby takes Belinda to see a chiropractor, then goes out alone to find logs for the Swamp Man order but lets his boat drift away; as Dreadknots tries to pull up a log, Dave's air line and the boat's winch both break, putting the crew out of action for the day; during a test dive for Chapman, Swilley stumbles across a log so heavy and deeply buried that it threatens to capsize the boat.
104	3	"Burying the Hatchet"	November 24, 2013
An uprooted tree and a broken tow rope test the Swamp Man buyer's patience as Shelby tries to pull a log for him; communication and equipment failures frustrate Rygaard's attempts to keep up production, so Craig persuades Jason to help; with Clint out sick for the day, Dave and Katelyn pull up a huge log for Dreadknots but damage the boat's propeller in the shallows; Swilley gets caught in an underwater fishing net during a dive, earning the Chapman crew's wrath; the tail hold tree on the Papac skyline collapses under the weight of a heavy turn, forcing Joe and Coatsy to work together on setting a new one.
105	4	"Out on a Limb"	December 1, 2013
Angered by Gabe's decision to keep hung-over crew member Albey on the job, Jason storms off the Rygaard site but reluctantly returns after a talk with Gabe; Shelby butts heads with his temporary assistant Brittany while chasing logs for Swamp Man during stormy weather; Mike's decision to hire a female greenhorn, Adrienne, raises safety concerns with the Papac crew as she tries to learn the basics; Clint and Dave split up to cover more ground in the Dreadknots log search and celebrate the day's haul with a cookout on the boat; frustrated over his latest failure to find logs for Chapman, Swilley lets gets into a tussle with Jeter that dumps them both overboard.
106	5	"Swamp Man Sabotage"	December 15, 2013
Shelby suspects Richard of sabotaging the Swamp Man boat and paddle barge, but Richard denies any involvement; roots of fallen trees snag the Papac skyline's rigging, but Joe comes up with a risky solution to untangle it that earns him a scolding from Mike; Gabe is beset with new problems at the Rygaard site, including Jason's unauthorized firing of Albey and a log that falls on the processor and prompts Jason to quit; with no babysitter available, Clint and Dave have to bring their children onto the Dreadknots boat and search for logs at the same time; Swilley successfully finds a giant log for Chapman and earns his place among the crew by wrestling it to the surface.
107	6	"Large Barge"	December 22, 2013
The Swamp Man crew navigates the paddle barge up a narrow creek and tears up a resident's dock while trying to recover a trove of logs; with Jason gone and Albey in court, Gabe does triple duty on the Rygaard site and is nearly hit by a wayward turn coming up the hill; radio problems on the Dreadknots boat lead to Dave suffering a wrist fracture that will keep him from diving for several weeks; after Swilley helps Chapman pull up one of the biggest logs he has ever seen, the crew spots someone trying to steal some of the others they have collected; while topping a tree to set up a new tail hold for Papac, Joe neglects to watch out for Adrienne and nearly hits her with the tree section he cuts away.
108	7	"Father Knows Best"	December 29, 2013
Craig returns to help on the Rygaard landing, to Gabe's annoyance, and starts running roughshod over the crew as they reposition the yarder; Shelby and his friend Michael endure several mishaps aboard the Swamp Man boat, culminating with Shelby smashing a log into Michael's truck; the river currents prove too strong for temporary Dreadknots diver Erin to handle at first, but her second dive yields better results; Jeter stands guard over the Chapman log stash and chases away the thief who previously tried to steal from it.
109	8	"A Frayed Knot"	January 5, 2014
As Craig brings Jason back in to help Rygaard speed up production, the dissatisfied site owner calls in rival company Oakes; company owner Kelly Oakes cuts down a Rygaard skyline support tree in his way, collapsing the line and sparking a confrontation with Gabe; Shelby and Michael combine ingenuity and brute force to retrieve a valuable pine log for Swamp Man, pulling down a tree in the process; after the Papac yarder operator quits, Joe gets the job and soon runs into the same trouble he had in past seasons, endangering the crew with falling debris; Dave cuts off his cast and starts diving again, but he gets into an angry exchange with Clint, who decides to fire Katelyn in order to reduce headcount in the Dreadknots crew; when the log thief targets the Chapman stash again, Greg chases him off and destroys his boat by running over it. (First episode of the season to feature Kelly Oakes & Sons Logging.)
110	9	"Log Jam"	January 12, 2014
Equipment trouble forces Swamp Man to postpone the search for a rare log buried in alligator-infested swamp waters; Oakes and Rygaard trucks meet head-to-head on an access road, touching off an angry confrontation between Kelly, Craig, and Jason; the Rygaard driver later overturns his truck while rushing to the mills and dumps his load of logs, and Gabe blames Oakes for the accident; the Papac crew races to put out a fire, touched off by hot and dry weather conditions, before it can burn down the entire site; having split from Dreadknots, Dave and Katelyn bring in former S&S diver Brad and the company's old boat, whose mechanical problems keep them from pulling any logs; Clint calls in his brother Wayne to work as a new deckhand; both crews move onto Long Pond Lake, a former site of many sawmills.
111	10	"Logger Down"	January 19, 2014
The buried log proves a formidable challenge for Swamp Man to pull loose and drag home; when an electrical fire puts the Rygaard loader out of commission, Gabe buys a new one and lets his son try it out; without a working processor on the site, the Oakes crew must do bucking and chasing by hand in order to get logs out; Adrienne is taken to the hospital with a possible broken ankle after a jerk of the Papac skyline knocks her to the ground; Dreadknots works carefully to pull logs from the edges of the lake without damaging the residents' docks; Dave's boat breaks down in the middle of the lake.
112	11	"Bombs Away"	January 26, 2014
Shelby and Michael track down the Swamp Man boat after it is stolen, then take Michael's daughter on a nighttime log-hunting run into alligator territory; Gabe refuses to let the Oakes crew come through the Rygaard site to reach their next section, so they hike through the woods to continue the job; both of Kelly's sons are nearly hit by falling trees as the cutters work at full speed; Swilley brings up a bomb from the riverbed, throwing the Chapman crew into a panic until diver Roger recognizes it as a harmless dummy; Dave and Brad steal the Dreadknots boat's wheel as a prank, then bring up a pair of logs as an electrical fire puts Clint and his crew out of action.
113	12	"Who'll Stop the Reign?"	February 9, 2014
Shelby gets a surprise visit from the Swamp Man buyer and must persuade him to keep his large order open; Joe's plan to free the Papac skyline from a tangle of trees results in serious yarder damage that idles the crew for the day; Gabe brings in a huge feller buncher to cut down trees quickly, then steps in to help the Rygaard crew fix a problem with a low skyline; Swilley risks a deep dive without his communications gear to find a giant log for Chapman as a storm moves in; equipment problems and the same bad weather put an early end to the day for both Dreadknots and Dave's crew.
114	13	"Ax Marks the Spot"	February 16, 2014
After learning that a Rygaard log truck ran an Oakes driver into a ditch, Kelly retaliates by flipping a Rygaard pickup off the road; the Rygaard crew drops piles of logs to block in Kelly's truck, and Jason crushes it and throws it aside; Shelby and Brittany borrow an ATV and overturn it in the woods while hunting for specialty logs as part of the Swamp Man order; Swilley plays a prank on the Chapman crew by pretending to pull up gold coins from a Spanish shipwreck; Joe ignores Coatsy's advice to be less aggressive on the yarder, resulting in a Papac crew member injury and equipment damage that leads Coatsy to fire him; Dave takes the Dreadknots boat after the S&S one will not start; Clint has to get it running so he and his crew can intercept Dave and take their boat back.
115	14	"End of a Legend"	February 23, 2014
Shelby and Brittany ram the Swamp Man boat through a tangle of exposed branches in a bid to bring in a large haul of logs; at a new Papac site, Coatsy takes over yarder duty but starts to make mistakes due to his inexperience; Gabe's fast pace on the feller buncher nearly brings a tree down on a Rygaard crew member; Ax Cut pushes deep into the Louisiana swamps to pull logs for its biggest order to date, but Tommy injures his leg on underwater roots; after the weight of Dave's latest haul of logs causes the S&S boat to sink, Dreadknots rescues the crew and Dave ponders Clint's offer to rejoin him. (First episode of the season to feature Ax Cut Lumber.)
116	15	"Dog Days"	March 2, 2014
When Oakes starts to pull in trees cut by Rygaard, Gabe cuts a tree so that it falls on their skyline as a warning; Coatsy has to break up a fight among the Papac crew members after a long log slides off the landing, barely missing them; with Willy slowing down due to old age, Shelby takes his puppy Bedico out to hunt driftwood as part of a care package for Belinda; Jeter surprises Greg by diving to save Swilley during a dive for Chapman, and the crew risks alligator attacks during a nighttime expedition; Ax Cut wrestles up a log using Donald's creation, a hand-cranked winch mounted on a free-floating platform.
117	16	"Albie Damned"	March 9, 2014
Shelby and his friend Blake fight to bring in a huge log, then stumble across an even larger one and go after it with Brittany's help; after Coatsy's rushed yarder/landing sends a log back down the hill toward the Papac crew, Mike decides to re-hire Joe; Clint and Dave bring their crews back together and move into the area Chapman is working, wrestling with a log left for them that threatens to sink the boat; Swilley finds a set of prehistoric animal teeth while bringing up a log for Chapman, then comes up with a back full of leeches on his next scouting run; Albey is hit by a log Oakes is moving as the two crews keep working at close quarters; Ronald's decision to search the open lake waters turns up a sizable log for Ax Cut, but he and Donald argue over the best way to retrieve it.
118	17	"Tooth and Nail"	March 16, 2014
A mistake in setting up the anchor lines for the Rygaard yarder nearly causes it to topple as the crew races to pull in logs; the Oakes crew extracts one man's rotted tooth by tying a choker to it and throwing the choker downhill; Shelby, Brittany, and Blake hurry to pull a log out of the woods for Swamp Man before a storm moves in; Coatsy re-hires Joe and puts him in the rigging to get the Papac crew organized; Chapman finds a potential trove of logs, but can only bring up one before a storm forces them to shut down for the day; after the storm passes, the thief Chapman ran off the river tips off Dreadknots on where to find sunken logs.
119	18	"Battle Ax"	March 23, 2014
Confusion over whistle signals leads to several mishaps for both Rygaard and Oakes, as well as a fight between the two yarder operators; Shelby pulls in a beached log for Swamp Man with help from Belinda and Brittany, but has to return it after the landowner files a complaint with the police; Joe and Coatsy keep the Papac crew's productivity up despite occasional minor disagreements; Dreadknots pranks Chapman by decorating their boat with medical products for the elderly, then gets a surprise visit from the Florida Fish and Wildlife Conservation Commission while scouting a new stretch of the river; Chapman moves into the shallows, relying on Swilley instead of sonar to find logs; Ronald and Donald lead separate boats to finish the Ax Cut order and stay ahead of both their deadline and a storm.
120	19	"Trucked Up"	March 30, 2014
Shelby and Brittany run the Swamp Man boat aground due to engine problems, then sneak a log away from a pile that lies close to Richard's property; Gabe loses his temper when Jason offers Oakes the use of a Rygaard truck to clear away some fallen logs, then commandeers the load for Rygaard; Joe loads up heavy turns to make up for the Papac yarder operator's slow pace, but the added weight puts both Coatsy and the tail hold tree under tremendous strain; Dreadknots keeps up a fast pace, while both Swilley and Roger dive for Chapman in a shallow stretch near the former site of a logging railroad; when Ax Cut comes up short on board feet for its order, Donald's crew goes on a nighttime log search before the buyer's arrival the following morning.
121	20	"Cutting It Close"	April 6, 2014
A Papac cutter's foot injury leaves the crew shorthanded and scrambling to complete the last section of their site; an overturned Rygaard trailer threatens to derail Gabe's push to get every possible log to the mills; Shelby completes the Swamp Man order and uses the money to buy a plot of land for a sawmill of his own; as Dreadknots works through the final day of the logging contest, Chapman loses several hours to a damaged boat propeller and then goes after every log that registers on the sonar.

Season 7 final load counts:

- Papac – 2,214
- Rygaard – 2,203

Final Florida log counts:

- Dreadknots – 109
- Chapman – 108

=== Season 8 (2014–15) ===
No. overall	No. in season	Title	Original release date
122	1	"Logged and Loaded"	November 30, 2014
On a rugged site not touched by loggers for over 100 years, the Rygaard crew must clear their own roads and then bring in their backup yarder after the main one breaks down; distracted by an argument with Joe over his gung-ho behavior with the Papac riggers, Coatsy gets hit by a log and suffers several broken ribs; on a site full of muddy patches and rocky cliffs, Triack tries to safely wrestle logs over a ridge with only an excavator and skidder tractor; a $500,000 order sparks a fresh rivalry between Dreadknots and Chapman; Swilley's failure to respond from underwater throws Chapman into a panic as a storm moves in; a mixture of dead trees and valuable timber poses a challenge for Zitterkopf to remove them safely. (Note: This episode was dedicated to the memory of Jeremy Paapke, a Oakes Logging crew member who died in 2014.)
123	2	"Falling Fast"	December 7, 2014
When Joe takes over for the injured Coatsy, arguments and fights break out among the Papac rigging crew over who should take charge; a collision on the crowded Rygaard landing sends two 100-foot logs sliding down toward the rigging crew; Zane's attempt to cut down a tree near the Zitterkopf site owner's cattle fence backfires, leading to the fence being crushed; Triack's off-road log truck gets stuck in mud, forcing Dave to call Alec and Kellie off the site so they can pull it to the access road; Dreadknots scrambles to salvage the day after pulling several logs that turn out to be worthless.
124	3	"Failure to Communicate"	December 14, 2014
Papac's attempt to speed up production with shotgun logging fails due to the yarder operator's struggle with the controls; David refuses to let a hit from a falling tree stop him during a cutting contest with Zane on the Zitterkopf site; confusion over the two Rygaard yarder crews' signals leads to several near misses and one man getting his hand caught in a choker cable; muddy roads and an excavator breakdown leave Triack scrambling to keep a huge load of logs from overturning their trailer; after Swilley fails to radio in and disobeys Greg's order to stay with Roger while scouting an area, Greg accidentally hits his air tank with the Chapman boat's propeller while changing position to search for him.
125	4	"The Swampman Cometh"	December 21, 2014
Swamp Man goes in search of a hidden canal that promises to contain a wealth of logs; Gabe blames the Rygaard rigging crew for mishandling a 6-ton log when it splits in half on their first attempt to haul it up; when David hauls a load from the Zitterkopf site to the mill, production stalls due to his sons' inexperience with the loader; working the Papac landing, Adrienne is nearly hit by a turn of logs when she moves too soon to unhook its chokers; Alec's plan to save time while moving heavy, high-value logs puts him in danger of tipping or damaging the Triack skidder; Dreadknots' promising day ends abruptly when Katelyn injures her ankle while unloading the boat. (First episode of the season to feature Swamp Man Logging.)
126	5	"High Wire Act"	December 28, 2014
Shelby and his assistant Bob search the area for scrap metal they can use to repair the wheels on the Swamp Man buggy; Coatsy's return to Papac is marred by arguments with Joe and an uprooted tail hold stump, prompting him to leave Joe in charge until he has fully healed; a topping operation leads to lost time at Rygaard when the tree's cut section falls on the skyline and brings it down; assisted by Levi, David does some high-altitude limbing and topping to fill a special order for Zitterkopf; with Katelyn cleared to resume work, Dreadknots risks working into the night to bring in a stash of logs marked by Clint; Kellie's injuries in a weekend car accident leave Triack shorthanded.
127	6	"The Log and Winding Road"	January 4, 2015
Shelby and Bob push the Swamp Man buggy to its limits in a bid to reel in a rare and valuable log; Chapman targets a massive log, nicknamed the "Gump Log," that has resisted several crews' past attempts to retrieve it; a malfunction in the main Rygaard yarder forces Gabe to rely on Jason and the backup machine in order to keep wood moving; filling in for the Papac yarder operator, Joe uses impromptu meditation techniques to stay calm and overcome his past difficulties running the equipment; during Triack's push to get loads out before a storm moves in, a pile of logs slides loose, barely missing Dave; stomach trouble sends David to the hospital as the Zitterkopf crew moves to a new section of the site.
128	7	"Swamp Man Boogie"	January 11, 2015
Shelby, Belinda, and Bob have their hands full trying to free a log stuck in the mud of Lake Pontchartrain for Swamp Man; Chapman employs a heavy-duty barge and extreme tactics in a second bid to capture the Gump Log; a breakdown in the Rygaard processor forces a frustrated Jason to shut down the site and send the crew home; soft soil and heavy turns bring down the skyline lift tree on a new section of the Papac site; a shorthanded Triack crew has to contend with extreme steep slopes that send logs sliding and crashing into Alec's equipment; David must stay in the hospital for a week's treatment, leaving his sons to keep cutting wood on the Zitterkopf site.
129	8	"Teepee of Death"	January 18, 2015
Gabe leads a three-man effort to set up a new Rygaard skyline so the crew can resume production once the machinery is repaired; Bob gets some on-the-job chainsaw training from Shelby as they try to pull another log from Lake Pontchartrain for Swamp Man; Zane makes a risky attempt to bring down a tangle of valuable trees and help keep Zitterkopf on track; Papac's latest attempt at shotgun logging ends with a yarder brake failure that nearly drops the skyline carriage on the rigging crew's heads; as Dreadknots spends the day processing logs and meeting with their buyer, Chapman suffers a boat-crippling engine fire but is saved by Greg's timely arrival in a new boat; a heat wave and a skidder engine fire leave Triack scrambling to move loads without starting a forest fire or destroying the equipment.
130	9	"Old Log, New Tricks"	February 8, 2015
Shelby, Belinda, and Bob take the Swamp Man buggy out on a log hunt to pay for upgrades to the jet boat; with the Rygaard machines back in action, Gabe hires DJ to fill a crew opening; Joe has to fill in on yarder duty at the Papac site when the regular operator ends up in the hospital with dizzy spells; Chapman deploys both boats and the barge in a last brute-force effort to haul in the Gump Log; David returns to the Zitterkopf site, going against both doctor's orders and Levi's warnings as he resumes cutting trees. It received 1.85 million viewers.
131	10	"All's Fair in Loggin' War"	February 15, 2015
While waiting on the parts for the Swamp Man jet boat, Shelby takes flyboard lessons and borrows a jet ski to scout the bayou; a flat section of the Rygaard site puts so much stress on the skyline that a cable breaks, forcing the crew to trust an improvised repair job; Dave's attempt to pull a valuable log up from a steep drop-off on the Triack site threatens to topple the excavator; after Dreadknots spends a productive day searching for logs upstream, Clint suffers an ear injury that may put him out of action for weeks; Zitterkopf's rush order for a specialty log challenges David and Zane to bring down the needed tree safely and without damage.
132	11	"Don't Cross the Boss"	February 22, 2015
DJ's unexpected absence leaves the Rygaard crew shorthanded and prompts Gabe to fire him the following day; Papac takes a risk by bringing in a substitute yarder operator long out of practice; Shelby and Stephanie use the swamp buggy to wrestle a log free of the mud for Swamp Man; Ethan hires his friend Ike to assist on the Zitterkopf site, but Ike's mistakes endanger and annoy the rest of the family and lead David to fire him after one day; Triack faces pressure from its buyer to pull a load of valuable timber from the bottom of a deep canyon during a storm.
133	12	"DaVi and Goliath"	March 1, 2015
High water and strong currents test Shelby and DaVi during their search for the last logs needed to fund the Swamp Man jet boat upgrades; as the Papac crew moves the yarder to a new section of the site, Joe ends up hanging upside down from a tree as he tries to hang a pulley for the skyline; on Kellie's first day back at Triack following his car accident, he and the track hoe both come within inches of sliding off a cliff; Clint and Dave come to Katelyn's aid during her confrontation with a couple of fishermen who refuse to move out of the way of the Dreadknots boat; David gets an early start clearing a new access road on the Zitterkopf site, then gets bogged down while using it to haul out a load in the rain.
134	13	"Jet Logged"	March 8, 2015
Shelby and Bob test the upgraded Swamp Man jet boat by trying to haul in a capsized fishing boat; newly promoted hook tender Jeremy tries to send up an oversized log without bucking it, breaking a support tree on the Rygaard skyline; Triack purchases a rock truck powerful enough to haul out wood on its own, but using it poses risks both on the road and at the unloading point; with the Zitterkopf skidder broken down, David's plan to have Zane use his pickup truck to move logs sparks a fight between the two; the Chapman crew incurs Greg's wrath after they forget to hook up the boat's underwater sonar sensor and accidentally drop it to the riverbed.
135	14	"Log Runners"	March 15, 2015
Trucker Todd Dewey (featured on seasons 7 and 8 of the History series Ice Road Truckers) must negotiate a treacherous access road while hauling out loads for Rygaard; after modifying the Swamp Man jet boat to increase its pulling power, Shelby and his crew target a log stuck on the shore of the bayou; slick, muddy conditions on the steep Papac site cause logs to slide toward the rigging crew as they race to keep up production; the rival who tried to steal logs from Chapman in the previous season makes a new attempt to commandeer the crew's latest find; Ethan's shift as the Zitterkopf skidder operator ends abruptly after he breaks a cable while trying to pull a stuck log free.
136	15	"Cuts Like a Knife"	March 22, 2015
A jet boat breakdown leaves Shelby with no good logs to show off for an unexpected visit by the Swamp Man buyer, but his cousin gives him a tip on a promising location; Jeremy's inexperience in using the Rygaard "knife" to move turns enrages Gabe and damages the equipment badly enough to force a shutdown; falling debris puts the Papac crew at risk as they try to bring a massive, valuable log down over a 50-foot vertical drop to reach the landing; Chapman's day on the river is briefly derailed when Swilley gets caught in an underwater fishing net; in his haste to move logs to the Zitterkopf landing, Zane pulls down a group of standing trees and nearly crushes Ethan; Dave's son Cory, called in to help finish the current section of the Triack site, must maneuver the log truck on a precariously narrow landing.
137	16	"Fall of a Legend"	March 29, 2015
With the Swamp Man jet boat repaired, Shelby trades favors with a friend to get help pulling in the log his cousin showed him, now floating among an expanse of tree stumps; while trying to untangle a cable on the Rygaard yarder, Craig slips and suffers multiple severe injuries to his leg; as Triack races to get loads out before their site permit expires at the end of the day, a log rolls free and nearly hits Kellie; fed up with Greg's constant criticism over the logs he is finding, Swilley quits Chapman; David berates Zane and crew member Khaymon for goofing off and breaking logs with their pastime of "tractor jousting" during his absence from the Zitterkopf site; new Dreadknots hire Jenna, filling in for Katelyn after her ankle injury, has trouble steering the boat but surprises Clint and Dave by finding a log on her first dive.
138	17	"Rock Bottom"	April 5, 2015
With Rygaard crippled by equipment damage, and both Craig and the yarder operator out due to injuries, Gabe calls in his crew from previous seasons to jump-start production; one of the Papac riggers falls into a hole and impales his hand on a piece of wood; after nearly dropping a tree on Khaymon, Ethan decides that the Zitterkopf job is too much for him and goes home; now ahead of schedule on the Swamp Man order, Shelby takes a break to hunt squirrels and crows for the day's meals; when Roger has trouble fighting the strong river currents due to his age, Greg tries to dive in his place without success, then reluctantly decides to hire Swilley back at Chapman.
139	18	"Great Logs of Fire"	April 12, 2015
Shelby pulls a log off private property in order to make sure he has enough wood on hand to meet the Swamp Man buyer's expectations; after the Zitterkopf skidder rolls downhill and breaks a cable, David tries a risky topping strategy to improvise a yarding system as a storm moves in; as Dreadknots scouts a distant upriver site for new logs, Swilley rejoins Chapman, accepting Greg's apology and an offer to let him keep the proceeds from the first log he finds that day; during a visit from Gabe and Jason at the Rygaard family home, a convalescing Craig starts to agree with their suggestion that he retire for good; fires started by stray sparks are the least of Triack's worries after the log truck starts to roll off the road.
140	19	"All Hands on Deck"	April 19, 2015
Mike joins the Papac crew on the landing and brings in Skooby, a veteran from past years, to help with an area full of huge logs; Rygaard must overcome yet another knife breakdown and a narrow, twisting access road in order to have any chance of finishing their site on time; on the last, steepest section of the Triack site, Kellie throws logs down to Dave's brother Jim without a clear line of sight, putting him in danger; David's improvised skyline works well, but the Zitterkopf crew still falls behind in production after Khaymon accidentally drops a tree on it; with $75,000 to go on the $500,000 order, Dreadknots decides to salvage Logzilla, the former S&S boat that Dave sank during the previous season, and put it back in service alongside their main boat.
141	20	"Axpocalypse"	April 26, 2015
Joe's misstep brings his spiked boot down on a Papac man's hand, but the crew continues working to finish out the season; Dreadknots sends out both its new and old boats to get every possible log and out-produce Chapman; after Swilley's discovery of a massive log nearly sinks one of the Chapman boats, Greg marshals his forces to haul it in; a stuck clamp stops the Rygaard skyline carriage, but the crew is able to repair it and keep pulling loads; Dave is determined to finish out Triack's season by reeling in a giant log stuck on a steep incline above the landing; while cutting trees on the last acre of the Zitterkopf site, Zane nearly drops a group of huge trees on Khaymon's head; with his last logs on display, Shelby negotiates with the Swamp Man buyer in hopes of building up funds for next season.

Season 8 final load counts:

- Papac – 2,014
- Rygaard – 2,009
- Triack – 1,997

Results of the Chapman/Dreadknots logging contest:

- Chapman – $266,000
- Dreadknots – $262,000

=== Season 9 (2015–16) ===
No. overall	No. in season	Title	Original release date
142	1	"Shelby Strikes Back"	November 22, 2015
Swamp Man receives an order from furniture designer Brandon Morrison to find logs for a table and benches that he plans to donate to the local Boys & Girls Clubs of America chapter. After the search gets off to a slow start, Shelby and Brandon venture deep into the swamp and start finding valuable wood for both the table/benches and some lamps that one of Shelby's neighbors needs for her house. Brandon assembles the pieces with help from an old friend; after he and Shelby deliver them, he suggests that the two may be able to work together again in the future.
143	2	"Shelby Gets Schooled"	November 29, 2015
While scouting the swamp for logs to start the new season, Shelby and Swamp Man broker Chris Bodet unearth a logging auger. They take it to Southeastern Louisiana University and show it to Dr. Samuel Hyde, an expert in the history of the region. He shows them around the university's collection of artifacts from the swamp and becomes interested in working with Shelby to find more. After Shelby and Chris find a cannonball and a portion of a wooden boat keel along the shores of Lake Pontchartrain, they and Dr. Hyde uncover other artifacts and go in search of the location of a key Civil War battle. A musket ball, artillery shell fragment, and square-head nail convince Dr. Hyde that they have found the site.
144	3	"Life & Limb"	December 6, 2015
Gabe takes charge of starting Rygaard on a new job site as Craig convalesces from his leg injury, but a chaser quits after his slow pace and mistakes infuriate and endanger the crew; as Papac starts the biggest job in its history, bad weather and malfunctioning whistle signals result in a head injury that sends Joe to the hospital; Shelby heavily damages his jet boat while bulldozing his way into a cove, jeopardizing Swamp Man's chances to secure a contract with a new client; Chapman's plans to hunt for a logging train that derailed into the river stall when the crew is unable to quickly find logs to fund the effort.
145	4	"Sloppy Joe"	December 13, 2015
Shelby and his assistant Delmar use the swamp boggy and jet boat to hunt wood for a new Swamp Man client, but a stolen log and a stormy night leave them empty-handed; the shorthanded Rygaard crew struggles to keep up production until a heat wave triggers a statewide logging shutdown; when a sonar malfunction forces Chapman to probe the riverbed manually, Swilley brings up a rare, forked "double barrel" log; Joe returns to work at Papac, but his uncharacteristically slow pace hampers production even though Mike has added two members to the crew.
146	5	"Family Tree"	December 20, 2015
Gabe puts his son Aidan on the landing to bring the Rygaard crew back up to full strength, but begins to question his decision after Aidan gets hit by a log; at the site of a 19th-century sawmill, Chapman scours both the riverbed and a local museum for clues to the whereabouts of the sunken log train; with only one day left on the Swamp Man order, Shelby, Chris, and Delmar work into the night to pull in any usable logs they can find; a huge log rolls off the overcrowded Papac landing and nearly flattens the rigging crew, prompting Coatsy to change his plans so they can finish the site safely.
147	6	"Madman of the Mountain"	December 27, 2015
Shelby and Delmar take a break from the new Swamp Man order to deliver a stump to a neighbor for use in making furniture; a series of unlucky omens throws the Rygaard crew off its rhythm and hurts production in Gabe's absence; the first day on Papac's next job site ends early after a careless yarder operator damages the skyline carriage by crashing it into the underbrush; with Levi's help, David tries a risky high-altitude strategy to clear out a tangle of half-collapsed trees on Zitterkopf's biggest job site to date; Chapman's latest investigation yields only a few pieces of metal debris and nearly drowns Swilley due to an underwater snag that breaks his air hose. (First episode of the season to feature Zitterkopf & Sons Logging.)
148	7	"Root Canal"	January 3, 2016
Craig pays a surprise visit to the Rygaard site to help the crew repair the skyline carriage, but Gabe chafes at his presence and the past arguments between the two; a stubborn stump on the Zitterkopf site costs David a tooth and forces him to resort to explosives in order to clear it out for an access road; a last-second dive saves Coatsy from being crushed when the Papac yarder operator reels in a turn of logs too early; Chapman's search at a creek near an old railroad line turns up a shipwreck and brings Swilley face to face with a manatee, both of which they have to leave alone.
149	8	"Rygaard's Revenge"	January 10, 2016
Steve, the Rygaard yarder operator, resents Craig's decision to have him cut down some stumps that are causing turns to snag and break; after finding a sunken log in the swamps of the Mississippi River delta, Gary and Eddie return at night to pull it loose without tipping off other loggers about their hunting ground; as Shelby waits on a new order for Swamp Man, he calls in a crew to build him a treehouse he can use for shelter against storms and flooding; David teaches Levi to climb trees on the Zitterkopf site, only to fall from one the next day and suffer a possible broken leg. (First episode to feature Gary and Eddie.)
150	9	"Log Eat Log"	January 17, 2016
The Rygaard crew responds to Gabe's pressure to increase production by sending up a turn so heavy that the tail hold tree breaks, forcing a shutdown; Levi calls an ambulance to take David off the Zitterkopf site and to a hospital, where he is diagnosed with torn/strained ligaments and muscles in his leg; Gary and Eddie target a huge submerged log, but must dig, hack, and blast through decades' worth of overgrowth before they can even try to pull it free; Shelby uses the Swamp Man loader to flatten an old, graffiti-covered camper on a neighbor's land that squatters have been using as a shelter; Greg's decision to continue the search for the logging train results in badly frayed tempers among the Chapman crew after another fruitless day.
151	10	"Every Log Has Its Day"	January 24, 2016
As Papac sets up on a new site, Joe and Coatsy find good trees but a small, unforgiving landing waiting for them; when Aidan briefly gets his leg pinned under a turn on the Rygaard landing, Craig reminds him of his own leg injury and the need to think and work safely; Gary and Eddie have to muscle a heavy, worthless log out of the swamp mud in order to get at the valuable one beneath it; Swilley finds a log so heavy that it pushes even the Chapman barge to its limit, but legal restrictions prevent the crew from taking it; with a large new Swamp Man order coming in, Shelby goes on the hunt and quickly finds a log to start filling it.
152	11	"Getting a Leg Up"	January 31, 2016
A sliding log barely misses the Papac rigging crew and touches off a heated shouting match between Joe and Coatsy over how to work the site safely; after Swilley finds a leg on the riverbed that turns out to be a prosthesis, he and Roger bring up a pair of logs to help refill the Chapman coffers; Gary and Eddie find a promising log in a remote canal, but damage to the boat's motor forces them to make repairs before they can claim it; Shelby, his assistant Shotgun, and Chris start a tug-of-war against a stubborn log to keep wood coming in for the Swamp Man order.
153	12	"Take This Log and Shove It"	February 14, 2016
With the Papac crew under pressure to step up their pace, Mike tells Joe and Coatsy to settle their disagreements or risk being fired; Aidan is sent to work the Rygaard rigging over Craig's objections, but the heat and Gabe's hectoring eventually frustrate him so badly that he quits in a vocal show of disrespect; returning to the Zitterkopf site for the first time since his leg injury, David risks his knee and his safety to climb and top a tree; Chapman braves a torrential storm in order to bring up a valuable log.
154	13	"Reunited and It Feels Like Wood"	February 21, 2016
A storm forces Shelby to cut his day short with only one new log pulled in for the Swamp Man order; Gabe persuades Aidan to return to the Rygaard site and fulfill the commitment he made, but he faces harsh words from Craig at day's end; a fast-moving speedboat barely misses Roger while he and Swilley turn up one log after another for Chapman; as David starts to worry about falling behind on the Zitterkopf site, his brother Dale brings in some much-needed manpower for the day; Gary and Eddie have to do some delicate maneuvering to bring in a 50-foot log without getting it caught on the shore or capsizing their boat.
155	14	"Back in Black"	February 28, 2016
An electrical fire in the Rygaard skyline carriage touches off a battle of wills between Craig and Gabe over the best way to fix it; after a snagged turn uproots Papac's tail hold tree, Mike pushes the crew to reset the skyline and get loads moving again; at the sawmill, Gary and Eddie are disappointed to find that their logs are worth much less than expected; with one day left to finish the Swamp Man order, Shelby relies on one of Dr. Hyde's maps to lead him to a huge cache of logs; David and his friend Ike rig a zip-line to pull the last logs off the Zitterkopf site and finish the job on time, despite a few surprising kinks; Greg leads the Chapman crew in one last search for the sunken log train and finds a huge piece of metal debris that may have come from it.
156	15	"All Hail the King"	March 6, 2016
Shelby brings machinery and manpower to bear on the site of an old military fort in an all-night push to finish the Swamp Man order; Mike rallies the Papac crew to reset the tail hold tree and finish the last section of their site; Rygaard's drive to finish the season hinges on Craig pushing through age and a lack of practice to find his old rhythm on the processor; Greg drops a time capsule at the site of the train wreckage in his father's honor, then mobilizes the entire Chapman fleet to target the logs scattered around the area; hoping for one last score, Gary and Eddie find a log heavy enough to strain both the boat and their ingenuity.

Note: Rygaard is announced as the winner of the season-long "King of the Mountain" rivalry with Papac, but unlike past seasons, no final load counts are given.

=== Season 10 (2019) ===
No. overall	No. in season	Title	Original release date
157	1	"Back to the Woods"	July 11, 2019
Pihl faces challenges in cutting and moving 100-foot trees intended for use as utility poles without damaging them or the yarder; Jason, now in charge of Rygaard's day-to-day operations after Gabe's death, takes a small job to cover expenses in a lumber market downturn and gets a tip on a much larger one offered by the Washington state government; after losing two weeks to a winter storm, Harkness Logging owner Frank Harkness and his crew race to dig out their equipment and get back on schedule; Billy Ray Smith, owner of Buckin' Billy Ray's Tree Service, trains his son Hogan in cutting down trees that pose a danger to nearby houses.
158	2	"A Legend Returns"	July 18, 2019
With Harkness racing to finish one section of the job site by nightfall, Frank's son Jay R fights gravity to keep logs moving and his cutter machine fueled up; when a Pihl cutter quits without warning, Mike calls in former employee Dwayne Dethlefs to help the crew start a new job; Jason finds Craig on edge due to a machine breakdown on the Rygaard site, then puts in a winning bid on the state government job; as the family in charge of Etienne's Timber pushes to harvest 50 acres of trees in four days, a cutter machine breakdown forces son Wade to fell trees with a chainsaw without damage to neighboring property.
159	3	"Uphill Battle"	July 25, 2019
Heavy snow and steep terrain test the Harkness crew in their push to move their equipment uphill to a new job site; Wade has to fill in for Joann when she suffers a facial injury during a cutter blade repair job in the Etienne yard; Mike sets up a new skyline with help from Danny to finish Pihl's utility pole job, then sends Dwayne ahead to start cutting on the next site and guides the yarder through a stand of trees to reach it; Billy Ray gives Hogan some on-the-job training while cutting down a pair of dead cedars.
160	4	"Steel Knot"	August 1, 2019
While Dwayne and a second cutter keep felling trees on the Pihl site, Danny uses a pickup truck to help clear a tangled cable and set up a new skyline; with melted snow turning the Etienne yard into a swampy mess, Wade lays gravel on the access road so the trucks can haul logs to the mill; a mistake by Craig and a skyline carriage malfunction put Rygaard behind schedule on the first day of the government logging job; Billy Ray and Hogan devise a risky strategy to bring down a line of tangled, dead trees standing between two houses without causing any property damage.
161	5	"The Longest Road"	August 8, 2019
Danny is under pressure to finish Pihl's current site by the end of the day, working on steep terrain that overlooks a highway, and earns Dwayne's respect for his attention to detail; Wade buys a heavy-duty dump truck for hauling logs on Etienne's sites, but the needed modifications prove costlier and more difficult than expected; Rygaard loses more time to a skyline adjustment, communication conflicts, and a log processor breakdown in a push to complete one section of the site by day's end; Frank battles an oil leak in the cutter machine and a maze of stumps to bring down the last trees on the Harkness site.
162	6	"Whiteout"	August 15, 2019
Fresh snow and damage to the cutter machine complicate Harkness' attempt to bring in a stand of 100-foot trees and move the equipment before a new storm comes in; Billy Ray puts Hogan to the test in climbing and cutting a pair of huge dead trees; with the Rygaard processor out of commission for the day, the crew piles up so many logs on the landing that Jason calls an early halt to keep them safe; after the Etienne crew wrestles new tires onto the dump truck Wade bought, he takes it for a test drive to haul in a load of logs.
163	7	"Measure Twice, Cut Once"	August 22, 2019
Danny goes into the brush with the Pihl cutters to start clearing a site filled with 200-foot trees, including a dangerously leaning pair grown from a single trunk; Jason's failure to read the entire contract for the government job means that the logs Rygaard has been sending in are too long, reducing their value; Frank and his sons hurry to clear the snow off a steep access road so trucks can reach the Harkness landing, but the icy surface adds new hazards for the full trucks on the return trip; Billy Ray searches a storage shop for old chainsaws with Hogan during a storm, unearthing a rare model and some spare parts needed to repair his saws.
164	8	"Man Down"	August 29, 2019
As the Pihl cutters keep clearing the huge trees, Danny is nearly hit by a falling branch and Dwayne does take a blow to the head, but escapes serious injury thanks to his helmet; in Rygaard's drive to complete four job site areas in one day, a frayed skyline forces the crew to improvise a risky patch job using a pickup truck; before Harkness can move onto a new site, Frank has to muscle the processor along an icy access road and thaw out an ice-filled skyline carriage.
165	9	"Snappin' Trees"	September 5, 2019
The end of the Pihl job requires the cutters to bring down trees without damaging cabins on the site; after jump-starting the skyline carriage, Rygaard struggles to move logs safely up a steep, wet site and onto the landing; as Etienne begins a new job, Wade has to fix a hydraulic fluid leak on the company's new cutter machine, then quickly master its unfamiliar controls; Brandon and Jay R uproot the skyline's tail hold by pulling in overweight turns and must get a new one set up before they can move any more wood.
166	10	"Untethered"	September 12, 2019
Jason spends an exhausting day in the rigging in order to help keep the shorthanded Rygaard crew on schedule and prepare for the next site; the new Harkness site proves too steep for Jay R to cut it without a tether on his machine, forcing him to wait for Brandon to hook him up before he can get to work; Billy Ray and Hogan face the challenge of safely removing a tangle of storm-damaged trees from a forest park; after fighting through mechanical breakdowns to move to its newly cleared site, the Pihl crew reels from the sudden death of its yarder operator.

== See also ==
- Ax Men awards and nominations
