= Out of the Woods (disambiguation) =

"Out of the Woods" is a 2014 song by Taylor Swift, re-released in 2023 with 1989 (Taylor's Version)

Out of the Woods may also refer to:

- Out of the Woods (George Shearing album), 1965
- Out of the Woods (Oregon album), 1978
- Out of the Woods (David Wilcox album), 1980
- Out of the Woods (Tracey Thorn album), 2007
- "Out of the Woods", a 2012 song by Public Image Ltd from the album This Is PiL
- "Out of the Woods", a 2013 song by Foals from the album Holy Fire
- Out of the Woods, a 2019 memoir by Luke Turner, founder of The Quietus
