= Into the Woods (disambiguation) =

Into the Woods is a musical production written by Stephen Sondheim and James Lapine.

Into the Woods may also refer to:

== Film and television ==
- Into the Woods (film), a 2014 Disney film based on the Sondheim musical
- "Into the Woods" (Brooklyn Nine-Nine)
- "Into the Woods" (Buffy the Vampire Slayer)
- "Into the Woods" (Desperate Housewives)
- "Into the Woods" (Gotham)
- "Into the Woods", an episode of Criminal Minds
- "Into the Woods", a TV show on the station CRTV, hosted by Phil Robertson
- "Into the Woods", one of 7 unaired episodes of Dinosaurs
- "Into the Woods", an episode of You

== Literature ==
- Into the Woods (novel), a children's fantasy novel by Lyn Gardner
- Into the Woods (Warriors), a manga for the Warriors series by Erin Hunter
- Into the Woods, a collection of short stories by fantasy author Kim Harrison
- Into the Woods: A Five Act Journey Into Story, a 2013 book on writing screenplays by John Yorke

== Music ==
=== Cast albums and soundtracks ===
- Into the Woods (original Broadway cast recording), a 1988 album containing a recording of the musical made by its 1987 original Broadway cast
- Into the Woods (soundtrack), the soundtrack to the 2014 Disney film

=== Other ===
- Into the Woods (Malcolm Middleton album), 2005
- Into the Woods (Hawkwind album), 2017
- Into the Woods: The Best of Phil Woods, a 1996 compilation album by Phil Woods
- Into the Woods (EP), a 2011 EP by Of Monsters and Men
- "Into the Woods", a song by My Morning Jacket from the album Z

== See also ==
- Into the Forest, a 2015 film based on an eponymous 1996 novel
