= List of reality television programs with LGBTQ cast members =

This is a List of reality television programs that include real life lesbian, gay, bisexual, transgender, non-binary, pansexual, queer, or otherwise LGBTQ, persons in the cast. Reality programs that feature an LGBTQ+ theme, with or without LGBTQ cast members, are included.

== 1970s ==
Year	Title	Network	Cast member	Notes
1973	An American Family	PBS	Lance Loud	

== 1990s ==
Year	Title	Network	Cast member	Notes
1998–	The Challenge	MTV	Ryan Kehoe (Fresh Meat)	
1998–	The Challenge	MTV	Evelyn Smith (Fresh Meat)	
1998–	The Challenge	MTV	Laurel Stucky (Fresh Meat II)	
1998–	The Challenge	MTV	Shane Raines (Battle of the Bloodlines)	
1998–	The Challenge	MTV	Gus Kenworthy (Champs vs. Pros)	
1998–	The Challenge	MTV	Ben Davis (Threats & New Vets)	
1996–1998	All Rise for Julian Clary		Julian Clary	"Judge" Julian Clary hears cases of disputes between friends and neighbors.
1995–2007	Road Rules	MTV	Sophia Pasquis (The Quest)	
1995–2007	Road Rules	MTV	Veronica Portillo (Semester at Sea)	
1995–2007	Road Rules	MTV	Shane Landrum (Campus Crawl)	
1995–2007	Road Rules	MTV	Rachel Robinson (Campus Crawl)	
1995–2007	Road Rules	MTV	Danny Dias (X-Treme)	
1995–2007	Road Rules	MTV	Nick Haggart (X-Treme)	
1995–2007	Road Rules	MTV	Ivory Martinez (Viewers' Revenge)	
1995–2007	Road Rules	MTV	LaMonte Ponder (Viewers' Revenge)	
1995–2007	Road Rules	MTV	Mike Flatley (Viewers' Revenge)	
1992–	The Real World	MTV	Norman Korpi (New York)	Late teens and 20-somethings living together, some LGBT roommates. While most gay, lesbian and bisexual cast members' sexuality were discussed or shown on the program. Coral did not come out of the closet (as having a fluid sexuality) until years after her season had ended. Norman dated Charles Perez on-camera, which had the effect of outing Perez. Pedro Zamora dated Sean Sasser on the show and the two exchanged vows in an on-air commitment ceremony. Despite a confrontation with a castmate ending with him being called a homosexual, Williams (Seattle) did not come out until a subsequent reunion special. Marlon identified as having bisexual tendencies in the course of the series, later publicly moved away from so identifying, before coming out as bisexual on The Challenge. Arielle and Ashley are ex-girlfriends brought together for a season dubbed "Real World: Ex-plosion".
1992–	The Real World	MTV	Beth Anthony (Los Angeles)	
1992–	The Real World	MTV	Pedro Zamora (San Francisco)	
1992–	The Real World	MTV	Dan Renzi (Miami)	
1992–	The Real World	MTV	Genesis Moss (Boston)	
1992–	The Real World	MTV	Stephen Williams (Seattle)	
1992–	The Real World	MTV	Ruthie Alcaide (Hawaii)	
1992–	The Real World	MTV	Justin Deabler (Hawaii)	
1992–	The Real World	MTV	Danny Roberts (New Orleans)	
1992–	The Real World	MTV	Coral Smith (Back to New York)	
1992–	The Real World	MTV	Chris Beckman (Chicago)	
1992–	The Real World	MTV	Aneesa Ferreira (Chicago)	
1992–	The Real World	MTV	Simon Sherry-Wood (Paris)	
1992–	The Real World	MTV	Karamo Brown (Philadelphia)	
1992–	The Real World	MTV	Willie Hernández (Philadelphia)	
1992–	The Real World	MTV	Tyler Duckworth (Key West)	
1992–	The Real World	MTV	Davis Mallory (Denver)	
1992–	The Real World	MTV	Shauvon Torres (Sydney)	
1992–	The Real World	MTV	Katelynn Cusanelli (Brooklyn)	
1992–	The Real World	MTV	J.D. Ordonez (Brooklyn)	
1992–	The Real World	MTV	Sarah Rice (Brooklyn)	
1992–	The Real World	MTV	Ayiiia Elizarraras (Cancun)	
1992–	The Real World	MTV	Derek Chavez (Cancun)	
1992–	The Real World	MTV	Emily Schromm (D.C.)	
1992–	The Real World	MTV	Mike Manning (D.C.)	
1992–	The Real World	MTV	Preston Robertson James (New Orleans (2010))	
1992–	The Real World	MTV	Nany González (Las Vegas (2011))	
1992–	The Real World	MTV	Frank Sweeney (San Diego (2011))	
1992–	The Real World	MTV	Sam McGinn (San Diego (2011))	
1992–	The Real World	MTV	Marlon Williams (Portland)	
1992–	The Real World	MTV	Arielle Scott (Ex-Plosion)	
1992–	The Real World	MTV	Ashley Ceaser (Ex-Plosion)	
1992–	The Real World	MTV	Nicole Zanatta (Skeletons)	
1992–	The Real World	MTV	Chris Hall (Go Big or Go Home)	
1992–	The Real World	MTV	Dondre Randolph (Atlanta)	
1992–	The Real World	MTV	Yasmin Almokhamad (Atlanta)	

== 2000s ==
Year	Title	Network	Cast member	Notes
2003–2006	The Surreal Life	The WB; VH1	Alexis Arquette	A trans woman who appeared in the reality series.
2005	TransGeneration	Sundance TV	Raci "Raycee" Ignacio	An American documentary-style reality television series that affords a view into the lives of four transgender college students during the 2004–2005 academic year. Two of the students are trans women, and two are trans men. Each of them attends a different school in the United States, and they are each at a different stage of their degree programs. The filmmakers document events in the students' academic careers, their social and family lives, and their transitions. Raci "Raycee" Ignacio and Andrea Gabrielle "Gabbie" Gibson are trans women, while Lucas Cheadle and Trent Jackson "T.J." Jourian are trans men.
2005	TransGeneration	Sundance TV	Andrea Gabrielle "Gabbie" Gibson	
2005	TransGeneration	Sundance TV	Lucas Cheadle	
2005	TransGeneration	Sundance TV	Trent Jackson "T.J." Jourian	
2009–2011	The Fashion Show	Bravo	Jeffrey Williams	Williams is the winner of season 2.
2009–2010	Ghost Hunters Academy	Syfy	Adam Berry	As the winner of season 1.5, Berry joined the cast of Ghost Hunters.
2009–	Chopped	Food Network	Ted Allen	Allen, formerly the food expert on Queer Eye, is the presenter.
2009–2013	Top Chef Masters	Bravo	Suvir Saran season 3	
2009–	RuPaul's Drag Race	Logo (2009-2016) VH1 (2017-2022) MTV (2023–present)	RuPaul and contestants	RuPaul chooses from among drag queens to decide who will be "the next drag superstar". Rice, Mathews, and Kressley are judges. Most of the contestants are gay men. Other contestants Sonique, Kenya Michaels, Carmen Carrera, Jiggly Caliente, Monica Beverly Hillz, Gia Gunn, and Peppermint are transgender women.
2009–	RuPaul's Drag Race	Logo (2009-2016) VH1 (2017-2022) MTV (2023–present)	Santino Rice (season 1–6)	RuPaul chooses from among drag queens to decide who will be "the next drag superstar". Rice, Mathews, and Kressley are judges. Most of the contestants are gay men. Other contestants Sonique, Kenya Michaels, Carmen Carrera, Jiggly Caliente, Monica Beverly Hillz, Gia Gunn, and Peppermint are transgender women.
2009–	RuPaul's Drag Race	Logo (2009-2016) VH1 (2017-2022) MTV (2023–present)	Ross Mathews (season 7–)	RuPaul chooses from among drag queens to decide who will be "the next drag superstar". Rice, Mathews, and Kressley are judges. Most of the contestants are gay men. Other contestants Sonique, Kenya Michaels, Carmen Carrera, Jiggly Caliente, Monica Beverly Hillz, Gia Gunn, and Peppermint are transgender women.
2009–	RuPaul's Drag Race	Logo (2009-2016) VH1 (2017-2022) MTV (2023–present)	Carson Kressley (season 7–)	RuPaul chooses from among drag queens to decide who will be "the next drag superstar". Rice, Mathews, and Kressley are judges. Most of the contestants are gay men. Other contestants Sonique, Kenya Michaels, Carmen Carrera, Jiggly Caliente, Monica Beverly Hillz, Gia Gunn, and Peppermint are transgender women.
2009–2011	Holly's World	E!	Josh Strickland	
2009–2020	Cake Boss	TLC	Tony "Tone Tone" Albanese	Albanese is an intern during season 1.
2009–	HaMerotz LaMillion	Channel 2 Channel 13	Tom Baum and Uriel Yekutiel (season 4)	
2009–	HaMerotz LaMillion	Channel 2 Channel 13	Adi Carmeli (season 6)	
2009–	HaMerotz LaMillion	Channel 2 Channel 13	Haviv and Itzhak Maman (season 7)	
2009–2014	The Amazing Race (Latin America)	Discovery Latin America; Space	Gilberto "Beto" Morón and Juan "Juanjo" López (season 5)	
2009	Undercover Princes	BBC Three	Manvendra Singh Gohil	
2009	Tacky House	Style	Thom Filicia	Former Queer Eye design guru redoes homes for people who have gone overboard on a theme.
2009	NYC Prep	Bravo	Peter "PC" Peterson	PC is one of the characters the show follows. While in Mexico on vacation his friend outs him as bisexual to two girls on the beach. His bisexuality is acknowledged later in the series by another character, Taylor, who in an interview makes remarks about his bisexuality.
2009	Miami Social	Bravo		Follows the lives of seven friends in Miami.
2008–2010	She's Got the Look	TV Land	Robert Verdi (season 1)	Robert served on the judges panel. Paula and Sandy identify as lesbians.
2008–2010	She's Got the Look	TV Land	Paula Thomas (season 1)	Robert served on the judges panel. Paula and Sandy identify as lesbians.
2008–2010	She's Got the Look	TV Land	Sandy Young (season 2)	Robert served on the judges panel. Paula and Sandy identify as lesbians.
2008–2009	Bromance	MTV	Michael Flatley	
2008	Big Brother Brasil 8	Globo	Bianca Jahara	
2008	Big Brother Brasil 8	Globo	Marcelo Arantes	
2008	Transamerican Love Story	Logo	Calpernia Addams	Dating show in which the transgender woman Addams must select from among eight suitors, including Jim, who is himself transgender. James is Addams' confidant. Mapa is the host.
2008	Transamerican Love Story	Logo	Alec Mapa	Dating show in which the transgender woman Addams must select from among eight suitors, including Jim, who is himself transgender. James is Addams' confidant. Mapa is the host.
2008	Transamerican Love Story	Logo	Andrea James	Dating show in which the transgender woman Addams must select from among eight suitors, including Jim, who is himself transgender. James is Addams' confidant. Mapa is the host.
2008	Transamerican Love Story	Logo	Jim	Dating show in which the transgender woman Addams must select from among eight suitors, including Jim, who is himself transgender. James is Addams' confidant. Mapa is the host.
2008–2009	Make Me a Supermodel	Bravo	Ronnie Kroell (season 1)	Modeling competition show. Ronnie had a bromance with straight fellow model Ben DiChiara. C. J. is bisexual. Shimizu joined the show in season 2 as a judge. Shawn had been married to a man for eight years as of the taping.
2008–2009	Make Me a Supermodel	Bravo	Jenny Shimizu (season 2)	Modeling competition show. Ronnie had a bromance with straight fellow model Ben DiChiara. C. J. is bisexual. Shimizu joined the show in season 2 as a judge. Shawn had been married to a man for eight years as of the taping.
2008–2009	Make Me a Supermodel	Bravo	Chris Cohen (season 2)	Modeling competition show. Ronnie had a bromance with straight fellow model Ben DiChiara. C. J. is bisexual. Shimizu joined the show in season 2 as a judge. Shawn had been married to a man for eight years as of the taping.
2008–2009	Make Me a Supermodel	Bravo	C. J. Kirkham (season 2)	Modeling competition show. Ronnie had a bromance with straight fellow model Ben DiChiara. C. J. is bisexual. Shimizu joined the show in season 2 as a judge. Shawn had been married to a man for eight years as of the taping.
2008–2009	Make Me a Supermodel	Bravo	Shawn Nishikawa (season 2)	Modeling competition show. Ronnie had a bromance with straight fellow model Ben DiChiara. C. J. is bisexual. Shimizu joined the show in season 2 as a judge. Shawn had been married to a man for eight years as of the taping.
2008–2011	Out of the Wild	Discovery Channel	Jake Nodar (season 2)	
2008–2011	Out of the Wild	Discovery Channel	Rob Lacombe (season 3)	
2008–2013	The Rachel Zoe Project	Bravo	Brad Goreski	Goreski was Zoe's assistant and style consultant for the first three seasons.
2008	A Shot at Love II with Tila Tequila	MTV	Tila Tequila	Follow-up to the original 2007 series.
2007	Deserving Design	HGTV	Vern Yip	
2007–2011	Paranormal State	A&E	Ryan Buell	Buell came out as bisexual in his 2010 memoir.
2007–2018	Flipping Out	Bravo	Jeff Lewis	Series about Lewis, who buys houses and "flips" them for profit. Edward, Lewis's boyfriend, joined the series in season 5 as his assistant.
2007–2018	Flipping Out	Bravo	Gage Edward	Series about Lewis, who buys houses and "flips" them for profit. Edward, Lewis's boyfriend, joined the series in season 5 as his assistant.
2007	Any Dream Will Do	BBC One	Graham Norton	Reality singing competition to cast the lead in a new production of Joseph and the Amazing Technicolor Dreamcoat. Norton was the presenter. Barrowman sat on the judge's panel.
2007	Any Dream Will Do	BBC One	John Barrowman	Reality singing competition to cast the lead in a new production of Joseph and the Amazing Technicolor Dreamcoat. Norton was the presenter. Barrowman sat on the judge's panel.
2007	Any Dream Will Do	BBC One	Daniel Boys	Reality singing competition to cast the lead in a new production of Joseph and the Amazing Technicolor Dreamcoat. Norton was the presenter. Barrowman sat on the judge's panel.
2007	Big Brother Brasil 7	Globo	Fani Pacheco	
2007	A Shot at Love with Tila Tequila	MTV	Tila Tequila	Dating show in which groups of straight men and lesbian women vie for the affections of bisexual Tequila.
2007–2009	Dress My Nest	Style	Thom Filicia	Home makeover show by former Queer Eye interior design expert.
2007–2008	The Amazing Race: A Corrida Milionária	RedeTV!	Narciso and Marcelo	
2007-2009	Rock of Love	VH1	Lacey Connor (season 1) Kristia Krueger (season 1) Angelique "Frenchy" Morgan (season 2) Destiney Sue Moore (season 2) Farrah Sinclair (season 3) Nikki "DJ Lady Tribe" Shamdasani (season 3)	
2006–2022	Survivor South Africa	M-Net	Rajesh Govender (season 2)	
2006–2022	Survivor South Africa	M-Net	Zavion Kotze (season 5)	
2006–2022	Survivor South Africa	M-Net	Sonette Myburgh (season 5)	
2006–2022	Survivor South Africa	M-Net	Corbus Hugo (season 7)	
2006–2022	Survivor South Africa	M-Net	Mike Laws (season 8)	
2006–2022	Survivor South Africa	M-Net	Santoni Engelbrecht (season 8)	
2006–2018	The X Factor (UK)	ITV	Joe McElderry (season 6)	Joe McElderry was the first gay contestant to win the sixth series of The X Factor in 2009. Lucy Spraggan auditioned for the ninth series in 2012, and is the first lesbian the enter the competition. Rylan Clark-Neal also entered that year and is openly gay. Honey G was the first rapper to enter the UK's biggest show for over a decade, auditioned for the thirteenth series in 2016, and came out as a lesbian half a year later.
2006–2018	The X Factor (UK)	ITV	Lucy Spraggan (series 9)	Joe McElderry was the first gay contestant to win the sixth series of The X Factor in 2009. Lucy Spraggan auditioned for the ninth series in 2012, and is the first lesbian the enter the competition. Rylan Clark-Neal also entered that year and is openly gay. Honey G was the first rapper to enter the UK's biggest show for over a decade, auditioned for the thirteenth series in 2016, and came out as a lesbian half a year later.
2006–2018	The X Factor (UK)	ITV	Rylan Clark-Neal (series 9)	Joe McElderry was the first gay contestant to win the sixth series of The X Factor in 2009. Lucy Spraggan auditioned for the ninth series in 2012, and is the first lesbian the enter the competition. Rylan Clark-Neal also entered that year and is openly gay. Honey G was the first rapper to enter the UK's biggest show for over a decade, auditioned for the thirteenth series in 2016, and came out as a lesbian half a year later.
2006–2018	The X Factor (UK)	ITV	Honey G (series 13)	Joe McElderry was the first gay contestant to win the sixth series of The X Factor in 2009. Lucy Spraggan auditioned for the ninth series in 2012, and is the first lesbian the enter the competition. Rylan Clark-Neal also entered that year and is openly gay. Honey G was the first rapper to enter the UK's biggest show for over a decade, auditioned for the thirteenth series in 2016, and came out as a lesbian half a year later.
2006–2017	Bad Girls Club	Oxygen	Ty Colliers (season 1)	Ty, Cordelia, Andrea, Flo, Brandi, Lea, Sydney, Judi, Erica F., Erika J., Julie, Stephanie G, Rocky, Tess, Stephanie R, Tiana, Milyn, Shanae, Aysia, Raesha, Ginger, Angela, Elliadria, Kailie, Zee, Kabrina, Sayyora and Seven are bisexual. Christina, Shelly, Zayden, Nancy, Redd, Blu, Kat, Olivia, Diamond, Kandyce and Deshayla are lesbians. Zayden came out as trans years after filming. After their respective seasons, Zayden and Raquel Santiago from season 10 dated, as did Jenniffer and Blu. At the time of Santiago's filming, she was queer, but now is straight. Olivia and Diamond dated prior to their time on the show. Diamond and Angela revealed that they were dating at the reunion, where Diamond proposed. It is revealed by Angela that she is not bisexual and the whole Angela and Diamond situation was staged. Numerous girls who don't use a label or identify as heterosexual have had romantic and/or sexual relations with bisexual and lesbian cast members and women outside of BGC. This includes Natalie Nunn, Amber McWha (both from season 4), Danielle Rosario (season 5), Camilla Poindexter and Amy Cielowski (both from season 8), Falen Ghirmai (season 9), Valenina Anyanwu (season 10), Sarah Oliver (season 11) and Jada Cacchilli (season 12).
2006–2017	Bad Girls Club	Oxygen	Sarah "Cordelia" Carlisle (season 2)	
2006–2017	Bad Girls Club	Oxygen	Andrea Sharples (season 2)	
2006–2017	Bad Girls Club	Oxygen	Florina Kaja (season 4)	
2006–2017	Bad Girls Club	Oxygen	Brandi Arceneaux (season 5)	
2006–2017	Bad Girls Club	Oxygen	Lea Beaulieu (season 5)	
2006–2017	Bad Girls Club	Oxygen	Christina Hopkins (season 5)	
2006–2017	Bad Girls Club	Oxygen	Sydney Steinfeldt (season 6)	
2006–2017	Bad Girls Club	Oxygen	Shelly Hickman (season 7)	
2006–2017	Bad Girls Club	Oxygen	Judi Jai (season 7, season 13)	
2006–2017	Bad Girls Club	Oxygen	Erica Figueroa (season 8)	
2006–2017	Bad Girls Club	Oxygen	Erika Jordan (season 9)	
2006–2017	Bad Girls Club	Oxygen	Julie Ofcharsky (season 9, season 13)	
2006–2017	Bad Girls Club	Oxygen	Zayden Ramos (season 9)	
2006–2017	Bad Girls Club	Oxygen	Stephanie George (season 10)	
2006–2017	Bad Girls Club	Oxygen	Jenniffer Hardwick (season 10)	
2006–2017	Bad Girls Club	Oxygen	Nancy Denise (season 10)	
2006–2017	Bad Girls Club	Oxygen	Tess Mett (season 11)	
2006–2017	Bad Girls Club	Oxygen	Stephanie Rivera (season 11)	
2006–2017	Bad Girls Club	Oxygen	Tiana Small (season 11)	
2006–2017	Bad Girls Club	Oxygen	Milyn Jenkins (season 11)	
2006–2017	Bad Girls Club	Oxygen	Shanae Thomas (season 11)	
2006–2017	Bad Girls Club	Oxygen	Alyssa "Redd" Carswell (season 12, season 13)	
2006–2017	Bad Girls Club	Oxygen	Jonica "Blu" Booth (season 12)	
2006–2017	Bad Girls Club	Oxygen	Aysia Garza (season 12)	
2006–2017	Bad Girls Club	Oxygen	Raesha Clanton (season 12)	
2006–2017	Bad Girls Club	Oxygen	Kat Florek (season 14)	
2006–2017	Bad Girls Club	Oxygen	Beatrice "Ginger" Miller (season 14)	
2006–2017	Bad Girls Club	Oxygen	Olivia "Liv" Adams (season 15)	
2006–2017	Bad Girls Club	Oxygen	Diamond Jimenez (season 15)	
2006–2017	Bad Girls Club	Oxygen	Elliadria "Persuasian" Griffin (season 16)	
2006–2017	Bad Girls Club	Oxygen	Kailie Lima (season 16)	
2006–2017	Bad Girls Club	Oxygen	Zee Carrino (season 16)	
2006–2017	Bad Girls Club	Oxygen	Kandyce Hogan (season 16)	
2006–2017	Bad Girls Club	Oxygen	Kabrina Nashaye (season 16)	
2006–2017	Bad Girls Club	Oxygen	Deshayla "Shay" Harris (season 17)	
2006–2017	Bad Girls Club	Oxygen	Sayyora Badalbaeva (season 17)	
2006–2017	Bad Girls Club	Oxygen	Seven Craft (season 17)	
2006–	The Real Housewives of Orange County	Bravo	Taylor Armstrong (season 17)	
2006–	The Real Housewives of Orange County	Bravo	Braunwyn Windham-Burke (seasons 14–15)	
2006–	Top Chef	Bravo	Ted Allen (seasons 3–4)	
2006–	Top Chef	Bravo	Ty-Lor Boring (season 9)	
2006–	Million Dollar Listing	Bravo	Madison Hildebrand	
2006–	Million Dollar Listing	Bravo	Josh Flagg	
2006–2013	HGTV Star	HGTV	Vern Yip	Yip is a member of the judges' panel. Bromstad was the winner of season 1 and went on to host Color Splash for HGTV. He returned in season 6 to mentor the contestants. Ezelle is the first openly lesbian contestant in the series' history.
2006–2013	HGTV Star	HGTV	David Bromstad (season 1)	Yip is a member of the judges' panel. Bromstad was the winner of season 1 and went on to host Color Splash for HGTV. He returned in season 6 to mentor the contestants. Ezelle is the first openly lesbian contestant in the series' history.
2006–2013	HGTV Star	HGTV	Josh Johnson (season 2; All-Stars)	Yip is a member of the judges' panel. Bromstad was the winner of season 1 and went on to host Color Splash for HGTV. He returned in season 6 to mentor the contestants. Ezelle is the first openly lesbian contestant in the series' history.
2006–2013	HGTV Star	HGTV	Michael Stribling (season 3)	Yip is a member of the judges' panel. Bromstad was the winner of season 1 and went on to host Color Splash for HGTV. He returned in season 6 to mentor the contestants. Ezelle is the first openly lesbian contestant in the series' history.
2006–2013	HGTV Star	HGTV	Matt Locke (season 3)	Yip is a member of the judges' panel. Bromstad was the winner of season 1 and went on to host Color Splash for HGTV. He returned in season 6 to mentor the contestants. Ezelle is the first openly lesbian contestant in the series' history.
2006–2013	HGTV Star	HGTV	Mikey Verdugo (season 3)	Yip is a member of the judges' panel. Bromstad was the winner of season 1 and went on to host Color Splash for HGTV. He returned in season 6 to mentor the contestants. Ezelle is the first openly lesbian contestant in the series' history.
2006–2013	HGTV Star	HGTV	Jason Champion (season 4)	Yip is a member of the judges' panel. Bromstad was the winner of season 1 and went on to host Color Splash for HGTV. He returned in season 6 to mentor the contestants. Ezelle is the first openly lesbian contestant in the series' history.
2006–2013	HGTV Star	HGTV	Nathan Galui (season 4)	Yip is a member of the judges' panel. Bromstad was the winner of season 1 and went on to host Color Splash for HGTV. He returned in season 6 to mentor the contestants. Ezelle is the first openly lesbian contestant in the series' history.
2006–2013	HGTV Star	HGTV	Trent Hultgren (season 5)	Yip is a member of the judges' panel. Bromstad was the winner of season 1 and went on to host Color Splash for HGTV. He returned in season 6 to mentor the contestants. Ezelle is the first openly lesbian contestant in the series' history.
2006–2013	HGTV Star	HGTV	Michael Moeller (season 5)	Yip is a member of the judges' panel. Bromstad was the winner of season 1 and went on to host Color Splash for HGTV. He returned in season 6 to mentor the contestants. Ezelle is the first openly lesbian contestant in the series' history.
2006–2013	HGTV Star	HGTV	Tyler Wisler (season 6)	Yip is a member of the judges' panel. Bromstad was the winner of season 1 and went on to host Color Splash for HGTV. He returned in season 6 to mentor the contestants. Ezelle is the first openly lesbian contestant in the series' history.
2006–2013	HGTV Star	HGTV	Leslie Ezelle (season 6; All-Stars)	Yip is a member of the judges' panel. Bromstad was the winner of season 1 and went on to host Color Splash for HGTV. He returned in season 6 to mentor the contestants. Ezelle is the first openly lesbian contestant in the series' history.
2006–2013	HGTV Star	HGTV	Kevin Grace (season 6)	Yip is a member of the judges' panel. Bromstad was the winner of season 1 and went on to host Color Splash for HGTV. He returned in season 6 to mentor the contestants. Ezelle is the first openly lesbian contestant in the series' history.
2006–2013	HGTV Star	HGTV	Karl Sponholtz (season 6)	Yip is a member of the judges' panel. Bromstad was the winner of season 1 and went on to host Color Splash for HGTV. He returned in season 6 to mentor the contestants. Ezelle is the first openly lesbian contestant in the series' history.
2006–2013	HGTV Star	HGTV	Tylor Devereaux (season 8)	Yip is a member of the judges' panel. Bromstad was the winner of season 1 and went on to host Color Splash for HGTV. He returned in season 6 to mentor the contestants. Ezelle is the first openly lesbian contestant in the series' history.
2006–2010, 2016	The Amazing Race Asia	AXN	Claire Goh (season 4)	
2006–2010, 2016	The Amazing Race Asia	AXN	Lisa and Nicole Truong-Marchetto (season 5)	
2006–2010	Solitary	Fox Reality Channel	David, AKA "Number 9"	David was a 28-year-old member of Mensa who worked for a non-profit organization. He was the first to quit.
2006–2008	Work Out	Bravo	Jackie Warner	Reality series following the life of a personal trainer. Warner is a lesbian, with long-time girlfriend Mimi. She employs various gay trainers throughout the series. During season 2, heterosexual Rebecca has a brief relationship with Jackie.
2006–2008	Work Out	Bravo	Doug Blasdell	Reality series following the life of a personal trainer. Warner is a lesbian, with long-time girlfriend Mimi. She employs various gay trainers throughout the series. During season 2, heterosexual Rebecca has a brief relationship with Jackie.
2006–2008	Work Out	Bravo	Brian Peeler	Reality series following the life of a personal trainer. Warner is a lesbian, with long-time girlfriend Mimi. She employs various gay trainers throughout the series. During season 2, heterosexual Rebecca has a brief relationship with Jackie.
2006–2008	Work Out	Bravo	Jesse "JD" Jordan	Reality series following the life of a personal trainer. Warner is a lesbian, with long-time girlfriend Mimi. She employs various gay trainers throughout the series. During season 2, heterosexual Rebecca has a brief relationship with Jackie.
2006–2008	Work Out	Bravo	Rebecca Cardon	Reality series following the life of a personal trainer. Warner is a lesbian, with long-time girlfriend Mimi. She employs various gay trainers throughout the series. During season 2, heterosexual Rebecca has a brief relationship with Jackie.
2006–2008	The Janice Dickinson Modeling Agency	Oxygen Network	J. P. Calderon	Stallings joined the agency in season 1. Calderon joined in season 2. Geismar and Snyder are confidants of series star Janice Dickinson. McCarron and Anderson are models who joined in season 3 and are boyfriends. de Carli joined in season 3.
2006–2008	The Janice Dickinson Modeling Agency	Oxygen Network	John Stallings	Stallings joined the agency in season 1. Calderon joined in season 2. Geismar and Snyder are confidants of series star Janice Dickinson. McCarron and Anderson are models who joined in season 3 and are boyfriends. de Carli joined in season 3.
2006–2008	The Janice Dickinson Modeling Agency	Oxygen Network	Gabrial Geismar	Stallings joined the agency in season 1. Calderon joined in season 2. Geismar and Snyder are confidants of series star Janice Dickinson. McCarron and Anderson are models who joined in season 3 and are boyfriends. de Carli joined in season 3.
2006–2008	The Janice Dickinson Modeling Agency	Oxygen Network	Duke Snyder	Stallings joined the agency in season 1. Calderon joined in season 2. Geismar and Snyder are confidants of series star Janice Dickinson. McCarron and Anderson are models who joined in season 3 and are boyfriends. de Carli joined in season 3.
2006–2008	The Janice Dickinson Modeling Agency	Oxygen Network	Rodrigo de Carli	Stallings joined the agency in season 1. Calderon joined in season 2. Geismar and Snyder are confidants of series star Janice Dickinson. McCarron and Anderson are models who joined in season 3 and are boyfriends. de Carli joined in season 3.
2006–2008	The Janice Dickinson Modeling Agency	Oxygen Network	Shaun McCarron	Stallings joined the agency in season 1. Calderon joined in season 2. Geismar and Snyder are confidants of series star Janice Dickinson. McCarron and Anderson are models who joined in season 3 and are boyfriends. de Carli joined in season 3.
2006–2008	The Janice Dickinson Modeling Agency	Oxygen Network	Paul Anderson	Stallings joined the agency in season 1. Calderon joined in season 2. Geismar and Snyder are confidants of series star Janice Dickinson. McCarron and Anderson are models who joined in season 3 and are boyfriends. de Carli joined in season 3.
2006	Chris & John to the Rescue!	OUTtv	Chris Carter	Best friends and self-proclaimed "culture aficionados" are out to save the world, one gay at a time.
2006	Chris & John to the Rescue!	OUTtv	John Simpson	Best friends and self-proclaimed "culture aficionados" are out to save the world, one gay at a time.
2006	Jacob and Joshua: Nemesis Rising	Logo	Jacob Miller	Jacob and Joshua are the openly gay pop duo Nemesis.
2006	Jacob and Joshua: Nemesis Rising	Logo	Joshua Miller	Jacob and Joshua are the openly gay pop duo Nemesis.
2005	Big Brother Brasil 5	Globo	Jean Wyllys	
2006	Gay Army	Sweden, Norway; Denmark, Italy; Germany (unknown networks)	All (except presumably the drill sergeant)	Effeminate gay men are removed from their cozy gay life, and into the hands of a U.S drill sergeant. Each episode, the gay "recruits" face new training missions designed to bring out the man and prepare them for battle. In the final episode they face the "real" army in war. Gay "recruits" will be treated to party nights and gay rewards as missions are accomplished.
2005–	Dancing with the Stars	ABC	Bruno Tonioli	
2005–	Dancing with the Stars	ABC	Louis van Amstel (various seasons)	
2005–	Dancing with the Stars	ABC	Mel B (season 5)	
2005–	Dancing with the Stars	ABC	Lance Bass (season 7)	
2005–	Dancing with the Stars	ABC	Margaret Cho (season 11)	
2005–	Dancing with the Stars	ABC	Carson Kressley (season 13)	
2005–	Dancing with the Stars	ABC	Chaz Bono (season 13)	
2005–	Dancing with the Stars	ABC	Diana Nyad (season 18)	
2005–	Dancing with the Stars	ABC	Jonathan Bennett (season 19)	
2005–	Dancing with the Stars	ABC	Michael Sam (season 20)	
2005–	Dancing with the Stars	ABC	Kim Zolciak (season 21)	
2005–	Dancing with the Stars	ABC	Adam Rippon (season 26)	
2005–	Dancing with the Stars	ABC	Juan Pablo Di Pace (season 27)	
2005–	Dancing with the Stars	ABC	Karamo Brown (season 28)	
2005–	Dancing with the Stars	ABC	Johnny Weir (season 29)	
2005–	Dancing with the Stars	ABC	Cody Rigsby (season 30)	
2005–	Dancing with the Stars	ABC	JoJo Siwa season 30	
2005–	So You Think You Can Dance	Fox	Sasha Mallory (season 8)	Mallory chose not to discuss her sexual orientation while on the series, feeling that it was "not important" in the context of the series.
2005–	So You Think You Can Dance	Fox	Travis Wall (season 2)	Mallory chose not to discuss her sexual orientation while on the series, feeling that it was "not important" in the context of the series.
2005–	So You Think You Can Dance	Fox	Benji Schwimmer (season 2)	Mallory chose not to discuss her sexual orientation while on the series, feeling that it was "not important" in the context of the series.
2005–2018	Iron Chef America	Food Network	Cat Cora	Cat Cora is one of the show's Iron Chefs.
2005	Open Bar	Logo	Tyler Robuck	Followed Robuck as he planned, built and opened a gay bar in West Hollywood, California.
2005	Real Gay	Logo		"Reunion show" featuring LGBT participants from many different reality shows.
2005–2008	Beauty and the Geek	The CW	Greg Soriano (season 5)	Self-proclaimed "Gaysian".
2005–2007	My Fabulous Gay Wedding	Global (season 1); Logo	Scott Thompson (season 1)	Reality show profiling the wedding celebrations of gay couples. Logo aired repeats of season 1, retitled First Comes Love, then picked up the show with new episodes hosted by Kurt.
2005–2007	My Fabulous Gay Wedding	Global (season 1); Logo	Elvira Kurt	Reality show profiling the wedding celebrations of gay couples. Logo aired repeats of season 1, retitled First Comes Love, then picked up the show with new episodes hosted by Kurt.
2005	Queer Eye for the Straight Girl	Bravo	Robbie Laughlin	Spin-off of Queer Eye that made over women instead of men.
2005	Queer Eye for the Straight Girl	Bravo	Danny Teeson	Spin-off of Queer Eye that made over women instead of men.
2005	Queer Eye for the Straight Girl	Bravo	Damon Pease	Spin-off of Queer Eye that made over women instead of men.
2005	Queer Eye for the Straight Girl	Bravo	Honey Labrador	Spin-off of Queer Eye that made over women instead of men.
2005	Showdog Moms & Dads	Bravo	Ryan Pacchiano	Behind-the-scenes eye on the competitive, quirky world of show dogs.
2005	Showdog Moms & Dads	Bravo	Brandon Kindle	Behind-the-scenes eye on the competitive, quirky world of show dogs.
2004–	Project Runway	Bravo (2004–2008); Lifetime (2009– )	Tim Gunn	
2004–	Project Runway	Bravo (2004–2008); Lifetime (2009– )	Jay McCarroll (season 1)	
2004–	Project Runway	Bravo (2004–2008); Lifetime (2009– )	Santino Rice (season 2)	
2004–	Project Runway	Bravo (2004–2008); Lifetime (2009– )	Christian Siriano (season 4)	
2004–	Project Runway	Bravo (2004–2008); Lifetime (2009– )	Jack Mackenroth (season 4)	
2004–	Project Runway	Bravo (2004–2008); Lifetime (2009– )	Anthony Ryan Auld (season 9)	
2004–	Project Runway	Bravo (2004–2008); Lifetime (2009– )	Bert Keeter (season 9)	
2004–	Project Runway	Bravo (2004–2008); Lifetime (2009– )	Bryce Black (season 9)	
2004–	Project Runway	Bravo (2004–2008); Lifetime (2009– )	Joshua McKinley (season 9)	
2004–	Project Runway	Bravo (2004–2008); Lifetime (2009– )	Rafael Cox (season 9)	
2004–	Project Runway	Bravo (2004–2008); Lifetime (2009– )	Viktor Luna (season 9)	
2004–	Project Runway	Bravo (2004–2008); Lifetime (2009– )	David Chum (season 9)	
2004–	Project Runway	Bravo (2004–2008); Lifetime (2009– )	Gunnar Deatherage (season 9)	
2004	Big Brother Brasil 4	Globo	Cristiano Carnevale	
2004–	Ghost Hunters	Syfy	Adam Berry	Berry joined the cast after winning Ghost Hunters Academy.
2004–2017	The Apprentice	NBC	Richard Hatch (season 11)	
2004–2017	The Apprentice	NBC	Clay Aiken (season 12)	
2004–2017	The Apprentice	NBC	George Takei (season 12)	
2004–2017	The Apprentice	NBC	Carson Kressley (season 15)	
2004	Mad Mad House	Sci Fi Channel	Ta'Shia Asanti	Asanti, a Voodoo priestess, is one of five "Alts" who select from among ten "normal" houseguests for a $100,000 prize.
2004	There's Something About Miriam	Sky One	Miriam Rivera	Reality dating game show in which men competed for the affections of trans woman Miriam.
2004	Seriously, Dude, I'm Gay	Fox	Jackie Beat	Fox pulled this special, in which two straight men competed for $50,000 by trying to pass as gay, following complaints from gay media watchdog group GLAAD.
2003–	The Joe Schmo Show	Spike TV	"Kip the Gay Guy" (season 1)	Reality television parody series. Lance Krall played Kip. Segun Oduolowu played Lavernius.
2003–	The Joe Schmo Show	Spike TV	"Lavernius the Black Guy" (season 3)	Reality television parody series. Lance Krall played Kip. Segun Oduolowu played Lavernius.
2003–	The Bachelorette	ABC	Kaitlyn Bristowe (Bachelorette, season 11)	Kaitlyn Bristowe confirmed on the Out & About podcast that she is bisexual. Josh Seiter a contestant on Kaitlyn Bristowe's season, came out as bisexual and has a boyfriend. Gabby Windey publicly came out on The View and revealed she has a girlfriend.
2003–	The Bachelorette	ABC	Josh Seiter (season 11)	
2003–	The Bachelorette	ABC	Gabby Windey (Bachelorette, season 19)	
2003–	America's Next Top Model	The CW	Jay Manuel	Manuel, Alexander and Talley served on the judges' panel. Adrianne, Michelle D., Leslie & Marvin are bisexual. Ebony, Kim, Megan, Brooke, Anya, Christin,Kayla, and Lennox are lesbians. Sarah R. was portrayed as fluid. Shandi, Sara L. and Kyle are genderfluid. Michelle B. said that she might be gay or bisexual. Isis is the show's first transgender contestant. Virgg and Quei are transgender as well. Bella came out as trans after her season. Claudia Charriez, a Cycle 6 semifinalist, is also trans and was the first trans woman to be a part of the show. Isis and Kayla returned for Cycle 17, billed as an "all-star" cycle. In Cycle 20, Banks expanded the scope of the competition to include male models as well. Cory is gay. Nyle is sexually fluid.
2003–	America's Next Top Model	The CW	J. Alexander	
2003–	America's Next Top Model	The CW	André Leon Talley	
2003–	America's Next Top Model	The CW	Ebony Haith (Cycle 1)	
2003–	America's Next Top Model	The CW	Shandi Sullivan (Cycle 2)	
2003–	America's Next Top Model	The CW	Nicole Borud (Cycle 3)	
2003–	America's Next Top Model	The CW	Michelle Deighton (Cycle 4)	
2003–	America's Next Top Model	The CW	Sarah Rhoades (Cycle 5)	
2003–	America's Next Top Model	The CW	Kim Stolz (Cycle 5)	
2003–	America's Next Top Model	The CW	Erika 'Nik' Pace (Cycle 5)	
2003–	America's Next Top Model	The CW	Alejandra 'Leslie' Mancia (Cycle 6)	
2003–	America's Next Top Model	The CW	Claudia Charriez (Cycle 6 Semi-finalist)	
2003–	America's Next Top Model	The CW	Brooke Miller (Cycle 7)	
2003–	America's Next Top Model	The CW	Megan Morris (Cycle 7)	
2003–	America's Next Top Model	The CW	Michelle Babin (Cycle 7)	
2003–	America's Next Top Model	The CW	Diana Zalewski (Cycle 8)	
2003–	America's Next Top Model	The CW	Jael Strauss (Cycle 8)	
2003–	America's Next Top Model	The CW	Renee Alway (Cycle 8)	
2003–	America's Next Top Model	The CW	Marvita Washington (Cycle 9 Semi-finalist/Cycle 10)	
2003–	America's Next Top Model	The CW	Sarah Hartshorne (Cycle 9)	
2003–	America's Next Top Model	The CW	Lisa Jackson (Cycle 9)	
2003–	America's Next Top Model	The CW	Jenah Doucette (Cycle 9)	
2003–	America's Next Top Model	The CW	Amy 'Amis' Jenkins (Cycle 10)	
2003–	America's Next Top Model	The CW	Anya Kop (Cycle 10)	
2003–	America's Next Top Model	The CW	Isis King (Cycle 11, 17)	
2003–	America's Next Top Model	The CW	Elina Ivanova (Cycle 11)	
2003–	America's Next Top Model	The CW	Lio Tipton (Cycle 11)	
2003–	America's Next Top Model	The CW	McKey Sullian-Alvey (Cycle 11)	
2003–	America's Next Top Model	The CW	Lulu Braithwaite (Cycle 13)	
2003–	America's Next Top Model	The CW	Brittany Markert (Cycle 13)	
2003–	America's Next Top Model	The CW	Courtney Davies (Cycle 13)	
2003–	America's Next Top Model	The CW	Kayla Ferell (Cycle 15, 17)	
2003–	America's Next Top Model	The CW	Christin 'Chris' White (Cycle 15)	
2003–	America's Next Top Model	The CW	Rune Longoria (Cycle 16)	
2003–	America's Next Top Model	The CW	Ashley Marie 'AzMarie' Livingston (Cycle 18)	
2003–	America's Next Top Model	The CW	Laura LaFrate (Cycle 18)	
2003–	America's Next Top Model	The CW	Cory Hindorff (Cycle 20)	
2003–	America's Next Top Model	The CW	Christopher 'Chris' Schellenger (Cycle 20)	
2003–	America's Next Top Model	The CW	Marvin Cortes (Cycle 20, Runner-up)	
2003–	America's Next Top Model	The CW	Virgg Lin (Cycle 20 Semi-finalist)	
2003–	America's Next Top Model	The CW	Corinne Hamilton (Cycle 20 Semi-finalist)	
2003–	America's Next Top Model	The CW	Will Jardell (Cycle 21)	
2003–	America's Next Top Model	The CW	Lennox Tillman (Cycle 21)	
2003–	America's Next Top Model	The CW	Romeo Tostado (Cycle 21)	
2003–	America's Next Top Model	The CW	Migual 'Cirio' Arman (Cycle 22 Semi-finalist)	
2003–	America's Next Top Model	The CW	Bella Sánchez (Cycle 22)	
2003–	America's Next Top Model	The CW	Nyle DiMarco (Cycle 22)	
2003–	America's Next Top Model	The CW	Cody Wells (Cycle 23)	
2003–	America's Next Top Model	The CW	Kyle McCoy (Cycle 23)	
2003–	America's Next Top Model	The CW	Quei Tann (Cycle 23 Semi-finalist)	
2003–	America's Next Top Model	The CW	Brendi Seiner (Cycle 24)	
Vega Harlan (Cycle 24)
2003–2013	What Not to Wear	TLC	Clinton Kelly	Makeover show focusing on helping people set and follow rules for dressing better.
2003–2008	Canadian Idol	CTV	Richie Wilcox	Tams is to date the only openly gay performer to win an Idol competition in North America.
2003–2008	Canadian Idol	CTV	Theo Tams	
2003–2007	Queer Eye	Bravo	Kyan Douglas	Original name Queer Eye for the Straight Guy. Wardrobe and home makeover show. Blair Boone appears in two episodes of the first season, credited as a "Guest Culture Expert".
2003–2007	Queer Eye	Bravo	Ted Allen	Original name Queer Eye for the Straight Guy. Wardrobe and home makeover show. Blair Boone appears in two episodes of the first season, credited as a "Guest Culture Expert".
2003–2007	Queer Eye	Bravo	Jai Rodriguez	Original name Queer Eye for the Straight Guy. Wardrobe and home makeover show. Blair Boone appears in two episodes of the first season, credited as a "Guest Culture Expert".
2003–2007	Queer Eye	Bravo	Thom Filicia	Original name Queer Eye for the Straight Guy. Wardrobe and home makeover show. Blair Boone appears in two episodes of the first season, credited as a "Guest Culture Expert".
2003–2007	Queer Eye	Bravo	Carson Kressley	Original name Queer Eye for the Straight Guy. Wardrobe and home makeover show. Blair Boone appears in two episodes of the first season, credited as a "Guest Culture Expert".
2003–2005	King of the Jungle	Animal Planet	Adam Stone (season 1)	Stone was the runner-up of the first season.
2003–2005	King of the Jungle	Animal Planet	Cynthia Weiss (season 2)	Stone was the runner-up of the first season.
2003–2005	King of the Jungle	Animal Planet	Matthew Buccilla (season 3)	Stone was the runner-up of the first season.
2003	Boy Meets Boy	Bravo	James Getzlaff	Relationship contest.
2003	Boy Meets Boy	Bravo	Wes Culwell	Relationship contest.
2003	Boy Meets Boy	Bravo	Brian Austin	Relationship contest.
2003	Boy Meets Boy	Bravo	Jason Tiner	Relationship contest.
2003	Boy Meets Boy	Bravo	Darren O'Hare	Relationship contest.
2003	Boy Meets Boy	Bravo	Robb MacArthur	Relationship contest.
2003	Gay Weddings	Bravo	Scott and Harley	Two gay and two lesbian couples are followed as they prepare for their upcoming marriage ceremonies.
2003	Gay Weddings	Bravo	Lupe and Sonja	Two gay and two lesbian couples are followed as they prepare for their upcoming marriage ceremonies.
2003	Gay Weddings	Bravo	Dan and Gregg	Two gay and two lesbian couples are followed as they prepare for their upcoming marriage ceremonies.
2003	Gay Weddings	Bravo	Dale and Eve	Two gay and two lesbian couples are followed as they prepare for their upcoming marriage ceremonies.
2002–	The Bachelor	ABC	Krisily Kennedy (season 7)	Kaitlyn, Krisily, Jaimi, Becca, Demi, and Elizabeth are bisexual. Alexa is sexually fluid. Melissa is a lesbian Colton was the Bachelor on the show's 23rd season, in which Demi participated. Even though Colton was in the closet at the time of his "Bachelor" reign, he revealed to Good Morning America after his breakup with his ex-girlfriend Cassie Randolph (the winner of his Bachelor season), that he is gay. Becca Tilley is confirmed that she's in a relationship with Hayley Kiyoko. Elizabeth Corrigan seemingly confirmed she's bisexual, according to her Instagram page. Jasmine Goode privately has a girlfriend, according to her Instagram page. Gabby Windey publicly came out on The View and revealed she has a girlfriend.
2002–	The Bachelor	ABC	Melissa Schreiber (season 15)	
2002–	The Bachelor	ABC	Kaitlyn Bristowe (season 19)	
2002–	The Bachelor	ABC	Becca Tilley (Season 19; Season 20)	
2002–	The Bachelor	ABC	Jaimi King (Season 21)	
2002–	The Bachelor	ABC	Jasmine Goode (Season 21)	
2002–	The Bachelor	ABC	Demi Burnett (Season 23)	
2002–	The Bachelor	ABC	Colton Underwood (Bachelor, season 23)	
2002–	The Bachelor	ABC	Alexa Caves (Season 24)	
2002–	The Bachelor	ABC	Elizabeth Corrigan (Season 26)	
2002–	The Bachelor	ABC	Gabby Windey (Season 26)	
2002–	American Idol	Fox	Jim Verraros (season 1)	Controversy resulted when Fox made Verraros remove gay content from network-sponsored website while he was competing. Aiken came out publicly several years after his appearance on the series. DeGeneres was a judge for season 9. Davis did not come out until years after her season had concluded. Noriega appeared on the sixth season of RuPaul's Drag Race as Adore Delano.
2002–	American Idol	Fox	Clay Aiken (season 2)	Controversy resulted when Fox made Verraros remove gay content from network-sponsored website while he was competing. Aiken came out publicly several years after his appearance on the series. DeGeneres was a judge for season 9. Davis did not come out until years after her season had concluded. Noriega appeared on the sixth season of RuPaul's Drag Race as Adore Delano.
2002–	American Idol	Fox	Frenchie Davis (season 2)	Controversy resulted when Fox made Verraros remove gay content from network-sponsored website while he was competing. Aiken came out publicly several years after his appearance on the series. DeGeneres was a judge for season 9. Davis did not come out until years after her season had concluded. Noriega appeared on the sixth season of RuPaul's Drag Race as Adore Delano.
2002–	American Idol	Fox	Danny Noriega (season 7)	Controversy resulted when Fox made Verraros remove gay content from network-sponsored website while he was competing. Aiken came out publicly several years after his appearance on the series. DeGeneres was a judge for season 9. Davis did not come out until years after her season had concluded. Noriega appeared on the sixth season of RuPaul's Drag Race as Adore Delano.
2002–	American Idol	Fox	Adam Lambert (season 8)	Controversy resulted when Fox made Verraros remove gay content from network-sponsored website while he was competing. Aiken came out publicly several years after his appearance on the series. DeGeneres was a judge for season 9. Davis did not come out until years after her season had concluded. Noriega appeared on the sixth season of RuPaul's Drag Race as Adore Delano.
2002–	American Idol	Fox	Ellen DeGeneres	Controversy resulted when Fox made Verraros remove gay content from network-sponsored website while he was competing. Aiken came out publicly several years after his appearance on the series. DeGeneres was a judge for season 9. Davis did not come out until years after her season had concluded. Noriega appeared on the sixth season of RuPaul's Drag Race as Adore Delano.
2002–2003	Beg, Borrow & Deal	ESPN	Julian Bryce (season 1)	
2002	Big Brother Brasil 1	Globo	André Gabeh	
2001	Lost	NBC	Joe Gulla	
2001–	The Amazing Race	CBS	Joe Baldassare and Bill Bartek (season 1, 11)	Reichen Lehmkuhl and Chip Arndt were the winners of season 4. Season 11, sometimes billed as an "All-Star" season, brought back previous Racers. Mel White is the gay father of the bisexual Mike White. Sam and Dan are brothers who came out to each other about a year before the show. Carol and Brandy are lesbians. Jordan and his straight brother Dan were the winners of season 16. Season 18, billed as "Unfinished Business", features the return of four openly LGB Racers from season 14. Kisha won season 18 with her straight sister, Jen. Josh and Brent are the stars of the series The Fabulous Beekman Boys. They are the winners of season 21. Jaymes and his Race partner James Davis are both performers with the Chippendales male dance revue. Season 28 featured teams of internet celebrities. Season 31 featured teams consisting of former Amazing Race competitors, Survivor competitors, and Big Brother houseguests. Alana Folsom is bisexual. Claire Rehfuss previously competed on Big Brother 23, and won season 34 with fellow Big Brother castmate and boyfriend Derek Xiao.
2001–	The Amazing Race	CBS	Oswald Mendez and Danilo "Danny" Jimenez (season 2, 11)	
2001–	The Amazing Race	CBS	Ken Duphiney (season 3)	
2001–	The Amazing Race	CBS	Aaron Goldschmidt (season 3)	
2001–	The Amazing Race	CBS	Andrew Hyde (season 3)	
2001–	The Amazing Race	CBS	Reichen Lehmkuhl and Chip Arndt (season 4) Winners	
2001–	The Amazing Race	CBS	Lynn Warren and Alex Ali (season 7)	
2001–	The Amazing Race	CBS	Patrick Vaughn (season 7)	
2001–	The Amazing Race	CBS	John Lowe and Scott Braginton-Smith (season 9)	
2001–	The Amazing Race	CBS	Lauren Marcoccio (season 10)	
2001–	The Amazing Race	CBS	Tom Rock and Terry Cosentino (season 10)	
2001–	The Amazing Race	CBS	Kate Lewis and Pat Hendrickson (season 12)	
2001–	The Amazing Race	CBS	Mel and Mike White (season 14, 18)	
2001–	The Amazing Race	CBS	Luke Adams (season 14, 18, 24)	
2001–	The Amazing Race	CBS	LaKisha Hoffman (season 14, 18) Winner	
2001–	The Amazing Race	CBS	Sam and Dan McMillen (season 15)	
2001–	The Amazing Race	CBS	Carol Rosenfeld and Brandy Snow (season 16)	
2001–	The Amazing Race	CBS	Jordan Pious (season 16) Winner	
2001–	The Amazing Race	CBS	Ron Zeitz and Bill Smith (season 19)	
2001–	The Amazing Race	CBS	Justin Young (season 19)	
2001–	The Amazing Race	CBS	Brent Ridge (season 21)	
2001–	The Amazing Race	CBS	Josh Kilmer-Purcell (season 21) Winners	
2001–	The Amazing Race	CBS	Jaymes Vaughan (season 21)	
2001–	The Amazing Race	CBS	Joey Graceffa (season 22, 24)	
2001–	The Amazing Race	CBS	Tim Tsao and Te Jay McGrath (season 25)	
2001–	The Amazing Race	CBS	Harley Rodriguez and Jonathan Knight (season 26)	
2001–	The Amazing Race	CBS	Bergen Olson and Kurt Jordan Belcher (season 26)	
2001–	The Amazing Race	CBS	James Earl Corley (season 27)	
2001–	The Amazing Race	CBS	Tyler Oakley and Korey Kuhl (season 28, 31)	
2001–	The Amazing Race	CBS	Scott Flanary (season 29)	
2001–	The Amazing Race	CBS	Seth Tyler (season 29)	
2001–	The Amazing Race	CBS	Trevor Wadleigh and Chris Marchant (season 30)	
2001–	The Amazing Race	CBS	Bret LaBelle (season 31)	
2001–	The Amazing Race	CBS	Will Jardell and James Wallington (season 32) Winners	
2001–	The Amazing Race	CBS	Alana Folsom (season 32)	
2001–	The Amazing Race	CBS	Taylor and Isaiah Green-Jones (season 33)	
2001–	The Amazing Race	CBS	Aastha Lal and Nina Duong (season 34)	
2001–	The Amazing Race	CBS	Claire Rehfuss (season 34) Winner	
2001–	The Amazing Race	CBS	Quinton Peron (season 34)	
2001–	The Amazing Race	CBS	Joe Moskowitz and Ian Todd (season 35)	
2001–	The Amazing Race	CBS	Ricky Rotandi & Cesar Aldrete (season 36)	
2001–	The Amazing Race	CBS	Yvonne Chavez & Melissa Main (season 36)	
2001–2014	Big Brother Australia	Network Ten, Nine Network	John Cass (Season 1)	John Cass, Nathan Morris, Jamie O'Brien, Claire Bellis, David Graham, Rob Rigley, Zach Douglas, Benjamin Norris, Ben Zabel and Nathan Little are gay. Andy Silva, Gordon Sloan, Sahra Kearney, Jaime Cedra, Geneva Loader, Rachael Burns, Lauren Clayton, Renee Black and Tully Smyth are bisexual.
2001–2014	Big Brother Australia	Network Ten, Nine Network	Andy Silva (Season 1)	John Cass, Nathan Morris, Jamie O'Brien, Claire Bellis, David Graham, Rob Rigley, Zach Douglas, Benjamin Norris, Ben Zabel and Nathan Little are gay. Andy Silva, Gordon Sloan, Sahra Kearney, Jaime Cedra, Geneva Loader, Rachael Burns, Lauren Clayton, Renee Black and Tully Smyth are bisexual.
2001–2014	Big Brother Australia	Network Ten, Nine Network	Gordon Sloan (Season 1)	John Cass, Nathan Morris, Jamie O'Brien, Claire Bellis, David Graham, Rob Rigley, Zach Douglas, Benjamin Norris, Ben Zabel and Nathan Little are gay. Andy Silva, Gordon Sloan, Sahra Kearney, Jaime Cedra, Geneva Loader, Rachael Burns, Lauren Clayton, Renee Black and Tully Smyth are bisexual.
2001–2014	Big Brother Australia	Network Ten, Nine Network	Nathan Morris (Season 2)	John Cass, Nathan Morris, Jamie O'Brien, Claire Bellis, David Graham, Rob Rigley, Zach Douglas, Benjamin Norris, Ben Zabel and Nathan Little are gay. Andy Silva, Gordon Sloan, Sahra Kearney, Jaime Cedra, Geneva Loader, Rachael Burns, Lauren Clayton, Renee Black and Tully Smyth are bisexual.
2001–2014	Big Brother Australia	Network Ten, Nine Network	Sahra Kearney (Season 2)	John Cass, Nathan Morris, Jamie O'Brien, Claire Bellis, David Graham, Rob Rigley, Zach Douglas, Benjamin Norris, Ben Zabel and Nathan Little are gay. Andy Silva, Gordon Sloan, Sahra Kearney, Jaime Cedra, Geneva Loader, Rachael Burns, Lauren Clayton, Renee Black and Tully Smyth are bisexual.
2001–2014	Big Brother Australia	Network Ten, Nine Network	Claire Bellis (Season 3)	John Cass, Nathan Morris, Jamie O'Brien, Claire Bellis, David Graham, Rob Rigley, Zach Douglas, Benjamin Norris, Ben Zabel and Nathan Little are gay. Andy Silva, Gordon Sloan, Sahra Kearney, Jaime Cedra, Geneva Loader, Rachael Burns, Lauren Clayton, Renee Black and Tully Smyth are bisexual.
2001–2014	Big Brother Australia	Network Ten, Nine Network	Jaime Cedra (Season 3)	John Cass, Nathan Morris, Jamie O'Brien, Claire Bellis, David Graham, Rob Rigley, Zach Douglas, Benjamin Norris, Ben Zabel and Nathan Little are gay. Andy Silva, Gordon Sloan, Sahra Kearney, Jaime Cedra, Geneva Loader, Rachael Burns, Lauren Clayton, Renee Black and Tully Smyth are bisexual.
2001–2014	Big Brother Australia	Network Ten, Nine Network	Jamie O'Brien (Season 3)	John Cass, Nathan Morris, Jamie O'Brien, Claire Bellis, David Graham, Rob Rigley, Zach Douglas, Benjamin Norris, Ben Zabel and Nathan Little are gay. Andy Silva, Gordon Sloan, Sahra Kearney, Jaime Cedra, Geneva Loader, Rachael Burns, Lauren Clayton, Renee Black and Tully Smyth are bisexual.
2001–2014	Big Brother Australia	Network Ten, Nine Network	Geneva Loader (Season 5)	John Cass, Nathan Morris, Jamie O'Brien, Claire Bellis, David Graham, Rob Rigley, Zach Douglas, Benjamin Norris, Ben Zabel and Nathan Little are gay. Andy Silva, Gordon Sloan, Sahra Kearney, Jaime Cedra, Geneva Loader, Rachael Burns, Lauren Clayton, Renee Black and Tully Smyth are bisexual.
2001–2014	Big Brother Australia	Network Ten, Nine Network	Rachael Burns (Season 5)	John Cass, Nathan Morris, Jamie O'Brien, Claire Bellis, David Graham, Rob Rigley, Zach Douglas, Benjamin Norris, Ben Zabel and Nathan Little are gay. Andy Silva, Gordon Sloan, Sahra Kearney, Jaime Cedra, Geneva Loader, Rachael Burns, Lauren Clayton, Renee Black and Tully Smyth are bisexual.
2001–2014	Big Brother Australia	Network Ten, Nine Network	Michael Farnsworth (Season 5)	John Cass, Nathan Morris, Jamie O'Brien, Claire Bellis, David Graham, Rob Rigley, Zach Douglas, Benjamin Norris, Ben Zabel and Nathan Little are gay. Andy Silva, Gordon Sloan, Sahra Kearney, Jaime Cedra, Geneva Loader, Rachael Burns, Lauren Clayton, Renee Black and Tully Smyth are bisexual.
2001–2014	Big Brother Australia	Network Ten, Nine Network	David Graham (Season 6)	John Cass, Nathan Morris, Jamie O'Brien, Claire Bellis, David Graham, Rob Rigley, Zach Douglas, Benjamin Norris, Ben Zabel and Nathan Little are gay. Andy Silva, Gordon Sloan, Sahra Kearney, Jaime Cedra, Geneva Loader, Rachael Burns, Lauren Clayton, Renee Black and Tully Smyth are bisexual.
2001–2014	Big Brother Australia	Network Ten, Nine Network	Rob Rigley (Season 6)	John Cass, Nathan Morris, Jamie O'Brien, Claire Bellis, David Graham, Rob Rigley, Zach Douglas, Benjamin Norris, Ben Zabel and Nathan Little are gay. Andy Silva, Gordon Sloan, Sahra Kearney, Jaime Cedra, Geneva Loader, Rachael Burns, Lauren Clayton, Renee Black and Tully Smyth are bisexual.
2001–2014	Big Brother Australia	Network Ten, Nine Network	Lauren Clayton (Season 6)	John Cass, Nathan Morris, Jamie O'Brien, Claire Bellis, David Graham, Rob Rigley, Zach Douglas, Benjamin Norris, Ben Zabel and Nathan Little are gay. Andy Silva, Gordon Sloan, Sahra Kearney, Jaime Cedra, Geneva Loader, Rachael Burns, Lauren Clayton, Renee Black and Tully Smyth are bisexual.
2001–2014	Big Brother Australia	Network Ten, Nine Network	Nick Sady (Season 7)	John Cass, Nathan Morris, Jamie O'Brien, Claire Bellis, David Graham, Rob Rigley, Zach Douglas, Benjamin Norris, Ben Zabel and Nathan Little are gay. Andy Silva, Gordon Sloan, Sahra Kearney, Jaime Cedra, Geneva Loader, Rachael Burns, Lauren Clayton, Renee Black and Tully Smyth are bisexual.
2001–2014	Big Brother Australia	Network Ten, Nine Network	Zach Douglas (Season 7)	John Cass, Nathan Morris, Jamie O'Brien, Claire Bellis, David Graham, Rob Rigley, Zach Douglas, Benjamin Norris, Ben Zabel and Nathan Little are gay. Andy Silva, Gordon Sloan, Sahra Kearney, Jaime Cedra, Geneva Loader, Rachael Burns, Lauren Clayton, Renee Black and Tully Smyth are bisexual.
2001–2014	Big Brother Australia	Network Ten, Nine Network	Renee Black (Season 8)	John Cass, Nathan Morris, Jamie O'Brien, Claire Bellis, David Graham, Rob Rigley, Zach Douglas, Benjamin Norris, Ben Zabel and Nathan Little are gay. Andy Silva, Gordon Sloan, Sahra Kearney, Jaime Cedra, Geneva Loader, Rachael Burns, Lauren Clayton, Renee Black and Tully Smyth are bisexual.
2001–2014	Big Brother Australia	Network Ten, Nine Network	Benjamin Norris (Season 9)	John Cass, Nathan Morris, Jamie O'Brien, Claire Bellis, David Graham, Rob Rigley, Zach Douglas, Benjamin Norris, Ben Zabel and Nathan Little are gay. Andy Silva, Gordon Sloan, Sahra Kearney, Jaime Cedra, Geneva Loader, Rachael Burns, Lauren Clayton, Renee Black and Tully Smyth are bisexual.
2001–2014	Big Brother Australia	Network Ten, Nine Network	Tully Smyth (Season 10)	John Cass, Nathan Morris, Jamie O'Brien, Claire Bellis, David Graham, Rob Rigley, Zach Douglas, Benjamin Norris, Ben Zabel and Nathan Little are gay. Andy Silva, Gordon Sloan, Sahra Kearney, Jaime Cedra, Geneva Loader, Rachael Burns, Lauren Clayton, Renee Black and Tully Smyth are bisexual.
2001–2014	Big Brother Australia	Network Ten, Nine Network	Benjamin "Ben" Zabel (Season 10)	John Cass, Nathan Morris, Jamie O'Brien, Claire Bellis, David Graham, Rob Rigley, Zach Douglas, Benjamin Norris, Ben Zabel and Nathan Little are gay. Andy Silva, Gordon Sloan, Sahra Kearney, Jaime Cedra, Geneva Loader, Rachael Burns, Lauren Clayton, Renee Black and Tully Smyth are bisexual.
2001–2014	Big Brother Australia	Network Ten, Nine Network	Little (Season 10)	John Cass, Nathan Morris, Jamie O'Brien, Claire Bellis, David Graham, Rob Rigley, Zach Douglas, Benjamin Norris, Ben Zabel and Nathan Little are gay. Andy Silva, Gordon Sloan, Sahra Kearney, Jaime Cedra, Geneva Loader, Rachael Burns, Lauren Clayton, Renee Black and Tully Smyth are bisexual.
2001–2014	Big Brother Australia	Network Ten, Nine Network	Jason Roses (Season 11)	John Cass, Nathan Morris, Jamie O'Brien, Claire Bellis, David Graham, Rob Rigley, Zach Douglas, Benjamin Norris, Ben Zabel and Nathan Little are gay. Andy Silva, Gordon Sloan, Sahra Kearney, Jaime Cedra, Geneva Loader, Rachael Burns, Lauren Clayton, Renee Black and Tully Smyth are bisexual.
2001–2008	The Mole	ABC	Jennifer Biondi (Season 1)	
2001–2008	The Mole	ABC	Jim Morrison (Season 1)	
2001–2008	The Mole	ABC	Bobby O'Donnell (Season 5)	
2001–2008	The Mole	ABC	Anderson Cooper (host)	
2001–2002	U8TV: The Lofters	Life Network	Mathieu Chantelois (Season 1)	
2001–2002	U8TV: The Lofters	Life Network	Jason Ruta (Season 2)	
2000–	Survivor	CBS	Richard Hatch (Season 1, Season 8)	Hatch was the season 1 winner. Calderon went on to become a model with The Janice Dickinson Modeling Agency. Todd Herzog is a flight attendant and a Mormon and season 15 winner. Ami Cusack tried out for The Amazing Race with her girlfriend and producers recommended her to audition for Survivor. She made a second appearance as a "Favorites" in Survivor 16: Micronesia. Colton Cumbie appeared on season 24 and later returned for season 27 along with his fiancé, Caleb. Caleb died on June 24, 2014, due to a work-related accident. Boyfriends Josh Canfield and Reed Kelly competed in season 29 as part of the Blood vs. Water twist. Season 34 was entitled Game Changers, and featured four returning LGBT contestants. Several contestants; including Sonja Christopher and Mitchell Olson did not have their sexuality discussed on-air. Evvie Jagoda is non-binary.
2000–	Survivor	CBS	Sonja Christopher (Season 1)	
2000–	Survivor	CBS	Mitchell Olson (Season 2)	
2000–	Survivor	CBS	Jeff Varner (Season 2, Season 31, Season 34)	
2000–	Survivor	CBS	Brandon Quinton (Season 3)	
2000–	Survivor	CBS	John Carroll (Season 4)	
2000–	Survivor	CBS	Scout Cloud Lee (Season 9)	
2000–	Survivor	CBS	Ami Cusack (Season 9, Season 16)	
2000–	Survivor	CBS	Coby Archa (Season 10)	
2000–	Survivor	CBS	Rafe Judkins (Season 11)	
2000–	Survivor	CBS	J. P. Calderon (Season 13)	
2000–	Survivor	CBS	Brad Virata (Season 13)	
2000–	Survivor	CBS	Ozzy Lusth (Season 13, Season 16, Season 23, Season 34)	
2000–	Survivor	CBS	Todd Herzog (Season 15)	
2000–	Survivor	CBS	Chet Welch (Season 16)	
2000–	Survivor	CBS	Natalie Bolton (Season 16)	
2000–	Survivor	CBS	Charlie Herschel (Season 17)	
2000–	Survivor	CBS	Spencer Duhm (Season 18)	
2000–	Survivor	CBS	Shannon "Shambo" Waters (Season 19)	
2000–	Survivor	CBS	Mark "Papa Bear" Caruso (Season 23)	
2000–	Survivor	CBS	Bill Posley (Season 24)	
2000–	Survivor	CBS	Colton Cumbie (Season 24, Season 27)	
2000–	Survivor	CBS	Dana Lambert (Season 25)	
2000–	Survivor	CBS	Michael Snow (Season 26)	
2000–	Survivor	CBS	Caleb Bankston (Season 27)	
2000–	Survivor	CBS	Brice Johnston (Season 28)	
2000–	Survivor	CBS	Josh Canfield (Season 29)	
2000–	Survivor	CBS	Reed Kelly (Season 29)	
2000–	Survivor	CBS	Kelly Remington (Season 30)	
2000–	Survivor	CBS	Tai Trang (Season 32, Season 34)	
2000–	Survivor	CBS	Zeke Smith (Season 33, Season 34)	
2000–	Survivor	CBS	Bret LaBelle (Season 33)	
2000–	Survivor	CBS	Donathan Hurley (Season 36)	
2000–	Survivor	CBS	Jeremy Crawford (Season 37)	
2000–	Survivor	CBS	Lyrsa Torres (Season 37)	
2000–	Survivor	CBS	Mike White (Season 37)	
2000–	Survivor	CBS	Aurora McCreary (Season 38)	
2000–	Survivor	CBS	Ron Clark (Season 38)	
2000–	Survivor	CBS	Elaine Stott (Season 39)	
2000–	Survivor	CBS	Missy Byrd (Season 39)	
2000–	Survivor	CBS	Vince Moua (Season 39)	
2000–	Survivor	CBS	Evvie Jagoda (Season 41)	
2000–	Survivor	CBS	Ricard Foyé (Season 41)	
2000–	Survivor	CBS	Romeo Escobar (Season 42)	
2000–	Survivor	CBS	Jackson Fox (Season 42)	
2000–	Survivor	CBS	Hai Giang (Season 42)	
2000–	Survivor	CBS	Chanelle Howell	
2000–	Survivor	CBS	Lydia Meredith (Season 42)	
2000–	Survivor	CBS	Geo Bustamente (Season 43)	
2000–	Survivor	CBS	Karla Cruz Godoy (Season 43)	
2000–2018	Big Brother (British TV series)	Channel 4 Channel 5	Nichola Holt (Season 1)	Transgender houseguest Nadia Almada won Big Brother 5 UK in 2004. Brian Dowling, an openly gay man, won the second series. Marco Sabba (series 5), Daniel Bryan (series 5, won third place), Derek Laud (series 6), Craig Coates (series 6, won fifth place), Kemal Shahin (series 6, also a crossdresser), Richard Newman (series 7, won fourth place), Michael Cheshire (series 7) and Dennis McHugh (BB9) are gay. Anna Nolan was the first lesbian seen on Big Brother (second place, series 1). Kitten Pinder is also a lesbian. Sara Folino (BB9) is bisexual. Shabby Katchadorian is a lesbian. Shabby developed a crush on friend and housemate Caoimhe Gurfole. Caoimhe said she was bisexual until she found out Shabby liked her. It was later revealed that Shabby loved her and Caoimhe thought it was just a crush. Ryan Ruckledge and Hughie Maughan (season 17) were the first same-sex couple to engage in a sex act on the show.
2000–2018	Big Brother (British TV series)	Channel 4 Channel 5	Anna Nolan (Season 1) Runner-up	
2000–2018	Big Brother (British TV series)	Channel 4 Channel 5	Sada Walkington (Season 1)	
2000–2018	Big Brother (British TV series)	Channel 4 Channel 5	Amma Antwi-Agyei (Season 2)	
2000–2018	Big Brother (British TV series)	Channel 4 Channel 5	Brian Dowling (Season 2) Winner	
2000–2018	Big Brother (British TV series)	Channel 4 Channel 5	Josh Rafter (Season 2)	
2000–2018	Big Brother (British TV series)	Channel 4 Channel 5	Adele Roberts (Season 3)	
2000–2018	Big Brother (British TV series)	Channel 4 Channel 5	Nadia Almada (Season 5) Winner	
2000–2018	Big Brother (British TV series)	Channel 4 Channel 5	Daniel Bryan (Season 5)	
2000–2018	Big Brother (British TV series)	Channel 4 Channel 5	Emma Louise Greenwood (Season 5)	
2000–2018	Big Brother (British TV series)	Channel 4 Channel 5	Kitten Pinder (Season 5)	
2000–2018	Big Brother (British TV series)	Channel 4 Channel 5	Marco Sabba (Season 5)	
2000–2018	Big Brother (British TV series)	Channel 4 Channel 5	Craig Coates (Season 6)	
2000–2018	Big Brother (British TV series)	Channel 4 Channel 5	Derek Laud (Season 6)	
2000–2018	Big Brother (British TV series)	Channel 4 Channel 5	Kemal Shahin (Season 6)	
2000–2018	Big Brother (British TV series)	Channel 4 Channel 5	Sam Brodie (Season 7)	
2000–2018	Big Brother (British TV series)	Channel 4 Channel 5	Shahbaz Chauhdry (Season 7)	
2000–2018	Big Brother (British TV series)	Channel 4 Channel 5	Michael Cheshire (Season 7)	
2000–2018	Big Brother (British TV series)	Channel 4 Channel 5	Richard Newman (Season 7)	
2000–2018	Big Brother (British TV series)	Channel 4 Channel 5	Glyn Wise (Season 7) Runner-up	
2000–2018	Big Brother (British TV series)	Channel 4 Channel 5	Tracey Barnard (Season 8)	
2000–2018	Big Brother (British TV series)	Channel 4 Channel 5	Seán "Seány" O'Kane (Season 8)	
2000–2018	Big Brother (British TV series)	Channel 4 Channel 5	Gerry Stergiopoulos (Season 8)	
2000–2018	Big Brother (British TV series)	Channel 4 Channel 5	Dennis McHugh (Season 9)	
2000–2018	Big Brother (British TV series)	Channel 4 Channel 5	Charlie Drummond (Season 10)	
2000–2018	Big Brother (British TV series)	Channel 4 Channel 5	Freddie/Halfwit Fisher (Season 10)	
2000–2018	Big Brother (British TV series)	Channel 4 Channel 5	Rodrigo Lopes (Season 10)	
2000–2018	Big Brother (British TV series)	Channel 4 Channel 5	Angel McKenzie (Season 10)	
2000–2018	Big Brother (British TV series)	Channel 4 Channel 5	David Ramsden (Season 10)	
2000–2018	Big Brother (British TV series)	Channel 4 Channel 5	Lisa Elizabeth Wallace(Season 10)	
2000–2018	Big Brother (British TV series)	Channel 4 Channel 5	Corin Forshaw (Season 11)	
2000–2018	Big Brother (British TV series)	Channel 4 Channel 5	Caoimhe Guilfoyle (Season 11)	
2000–2018	Big Brother (British TV series)	Channel 4 Channel 5	Shabby Katchadourian (Season 11)	
2000–2018	Big Brother (British TV series)	Channel 4 Channel 5	Mario Mugan (Season 11)	
2000–2018	Big Brother (British TV series)	Channel 4 Channel 5	Tom O'Connell (Season 12)	
2000–2018	Big Brother (British TV series)	Channel 4 Channel 5	Luke Anderson (Season 13) Winner	
2000–2018	Big Brother (British TV series)	Channel 4 Channel 5	Benedict Garrett (Season 13)	
2000–2018	Big Brother (British TV series)	Channel 4 Channel 5	Scott Mason (Season 13)	
2000–2018	Big Brother (British TV series)	Channel 4 Channel 5	Sallie Axl (Season 14)	
2000–2018	Big Brother (British TV series)	Channel 4 Channel 5	Jack Glenny (Season 14)	
2000–2018	Big Brother (British TV series)	Channel 4 Channel 5	Wolfy Millington (Season 14)	
2000–2018	Big Brother (British TV series)	Channel 4 Channel 5	Dan Neal (Season 14)	
2000–2018	Big Brother (British TV series)	Channel 4 Channel 5	Mark Byron (Season 15)	
2000–2018	Big Brother (British TV series)	Channel 4 Channel 5	Christopher Hall (Season 15)	
2000–2018	Big Brother (British TV series)	Channel 4 Channel 5	Aaron Frew (season 16)	
2000–2018	Big Brother (British TV series)	Channel 4 Channel 5	Simon Gross (season 16)	
2000–2018	Big Brother (British TV series)	Channel 4 Channel 5	Adjoa Mensah (season 16)	
2000–2018	Big Brother (British TV series)	Channel 4 Channel 5	Sam Giffen (season 17)	
2000–2018	Big Brother (British TV series)	Channel 4 Channel 5	Hughie Maughan (season 17)	
2000–2018	Big Brother (British TV series)	Channel 4 Channel 5	Ryan Ruckledge (season 17)	
2000–2018	Big Brother (British TV series)	Channel 4 Channel 5	Andy West (season 17) )	
2000–2018	Big Brother (British TV series)	Channel 4 Channel 5	Raph Korine (season 18)	
2000–2018	Big Brother (British TV series)	Channel 4 Channel 5	Anamélia Silva (season 19)	
2000–2018	Big Brother (British TV series)	Channel 4 Channel 5	Brooke Berry (season 19)	
2000–2018	Big Brother (British TV series)	Channel 4 Channel 5	Cian Carrigan (season 19	
2000–2018	Big Brother (British TV series)	Channel 4 Channel 5	Tomasz Wania (season 19)	
2000–2018	Big Brother (British TV series)	Channel 4 Channel 5	Cameron Cole (season 19) Winner	
2001–2018	Celebrity Big Brother (British TV series)	Channel 4 Channel 5	Sue Perkins (Season 2)	Ian Watkins (Celebrity Big Brother 2007, won fourth place) is gay. Jackiey Budden (Celebrity BB 2007, first evictee) is a lesbian. Frankie Grande originally appeared on the sixteenth season of the American version of the show. India Willoughby is the first transgender housemate on the celebrity edition. Shane Jenek is better known as his drag persona, Courtney Act.
2001–2018	Celebrity Big Brother (British TV series)	Channel 4 Channel 5	Michael Barrymore (Season 4) Runner-up	Ian Watkins (Celebrity Big Brother 2007, won fourth place) is gay. Jackiey Budden (Celebrity BB 2007, first evictee) is a lesbian. Frankie Grande originally appeared on the sixteenth season of the American version of the show. India Willoughby is the first transgender housemate on the celebrity edition. Shane Jenek is better known as his drag persona, Courtney Act.
2001–2018	Celebrity Big Brother (British TV series)	Channel 4 Channel 5	Pete Burns (Season 4)	Ian Watkins (Celebrity Big Brother 2007, won fourth place) is gay. Jackiey Budden (Celebrity BB 2007, first evictee) is a lesbian. Frankie Grande originally appeared on the sixteenth season of the American version of the show. India Willoughby is the first transgender housemate on the celebrity edition. Shane Jenek is better known as his drag persona, Courtney Act.
2001–2018	Celebrity Big Brother (British TV series)	Channel 4 Channel 5	Jodie Marsh (Season 4)	Ian Watkins (Celebrity Big Brother 2007, won fourth place) is gay. Jackiey Budden (Celebrity BB 2007, first evictee) is a lesbian. Frankie Grande originally appeared on the sixteenth season of the American version of the show. India Willoughby is the first transgender housemate on the celebrity edition. Shane Jenek is better known as his drag persona, Courtney Act.
2001–2018	Celebrity Big Brother (British TV series)	Channel 4 Channel 5	Ian 'H' Watkins (Season 5)	Ian Watkins (Celebrity Big Brother 2007, won fourth place) is gay. Jackiey Budden (Celebrity BB 2007, first evictee) is a lesbian. Frankie Grande originally appeared on the sixteenth season of the American version of the show. India Willoughby is the first transgender housemate on the celebrity edition. Shane Jenek is better known as his drag persona, Courtney Act.
2001–2018	Celebrity Big Brother (British TV series)	Channel 4 Channel 5	Jackiey Budden (Season 5)	Ian Watkins (Celebrity Big Brother 2007, won fourth place) is gay. Jackiey Budden (Celebrity BB 2007, first evictee) is a lesbian. Frankie Grande originally appeared on the sixteenth season of the American version of the show. India Willoughby is the first transgender housemate on the celebrity edition. Shane Jenek is better known as his drag persona, Courtney Act.
2001–2018	Celebrity Big Brother (British TV series)	Channel 4 Channel 5	Lady Sovereign (Season 7)	Ian Watkins (Celebrity Big Brother 2007, won fourth place) is gay. Jackiey Budden (Celebrity BB 2007, first evictee) is a lesbian. Frankie Grande originally appeared on the sixteenth season of the American version of the show. India Willoughby is the first transgender housemate on the celebrity edition. Shane Jenek is better known as his drag persona, Courtney Act.
2001–2018	Celebrity Big Brother (British TV series)	Channel 4 Channel 5	Gareth "Alfie" Thomas (Season 9)	Ian Watkins (Celebrity Big Brother 2007, won fourth place) is gay. Jackiey Budden (Celebrity BB 2007, first evictee) is a lesbian. Frankie Grande originally appeared on the sixteenth season of the American version of the show. India Willoughby is the first transgender housemate on the celebrity edition. Shane Jenek is better known as his drag persona, Courtney Act.
2001–2018	Celebrity Big Brother (British TV series)	Channel 4 Channel 5	Julian Clary (season 10) Winner	Ian Watkins (Celebrity Big Brother 2007, won fourth place) is gay. Jackiey Budden (Celebrity BB 2007, first evictee) is a lesbian. Frankie Grande originally appeared on the sixteenth season of the American version of the show. India Willoughby is the first transgender housemate on the celebrity edition. Shane Jenek is better known as his drag persona, Courtney Act.
2001–2018	Celebrity Big Brother (British TV series)	Channel 4 Channel 5	Rylan Clark (Season 11) Winner	Ian Watkins (Celebrity Big Brother 2007, won fourth place) is gay. Jackiey Budden (Celebrity BB 2007, first evictee) is a lesbian. Frankie Grande originally appeared on the sixteenth season of the American version of the show. India Willoughby is the first transgender housemate on the celebrity edition. Shane Jenek is better known as his drag persona, Courtney Act.
2001–2018	Celebrity Big Brother (British TV series)	Channel 4 Channel 5	Lauren Harries (Season 12)	Ian Watkins (Celebrity Big Brother 2007, won fourth place) is gay. Jackiey Budden (Celebrity BB 2007, first evictee) is a lesbian. Frankie Grande originally appeared on the sixteenth season of the American version of the show. India Willoughby is the first transgender housemate on the celebrity edition. Shane Jenek is better known as his drag persona, Courtney Act.
2001–2018	Celebrity Big Brother (British TV series)	Channel 4 Channel 5	Louie Spence (Season 12)	Ian Watkins (Celebrity Big Brother 2007, won fourth place) is gay. Jackiey Budden (Celebrity BB 2007, first evictee) is a lesbian. Frankie Grande originally appeared on the sixteenth season of the American version of the show. India Willoughby is the first transgender housemate on the celebrity edition. Shane Jenek is better known as his drag persona, Courtney Act.
2001–2018	Celebrity Big Brother (British TV series)	Channel 4 Channel 5	Ollie Locke (Season 13)	Ian Watkins (Celebrity Big Brother 2007, won fourth place) is gay. Jackiey Budden (Celebrity BB 2007, first evictee) is a lesbian. Frankie Grande originally appeared on the sixteenth season of the American version of the show. India Willoughby is the first transgender housemate on the celebrity edition. Shane Jenek is better known as his drag persona, Courtney Act.
2001–2018	Celebrity Big Brother (British TV series)	Channel 4 Channel 5	Leslie Jordan (Season 14)	Ian Watkins (Celebrity Big Brother 2007, won fourth place) is gay. Jackiey Budden (Celebrity BB 2007, first evictee) is a lesbian. Frankie Grande originally appeared on the sixteenth season of the American version of the show. India Willoughby is the first transgender housemate on the celebrity edition. Shane Jenek is better known as his drag persona, Courtney Act.
2001–2018	Celebrity Big Brother (British TV series)	Channel 4 Channel 5	Perez Hilton (Season 15)	Ian Watkins (Celebrity Big Brother 2007, won fourth place) is gay. Jackiey Budden (Celebrity BB 2007, first evictee) is a lesbian. Frankie Grande originally appeared on the sixteenth season of the American version of the show. India Willoughby is the first transgender housemate on the celebrity edition. Shane Jenek is better known as his drag persona, Courtney Act.
2001–2018	Celebrity Big Brother (British TV series)	Channel 4 Channel 5	Tila Tequila (Season 16)	Ian Watkins (Celebrity Big Brother 2007, won fourth place) is gay. Jackiey Budden (Celebrity BB 2007, first evictee) is a lesbian. Frankie Grande originally appeared on the sixteenth season of the American version of the show. India Willoughby is the first transgender housemate on the celebrity edition. Shane Jenek is better known as his drag persona, Courtney Act.
2001–2018	Celebrity Big Brother (British TV series)	Channel 4 Channel 5	Austin Armacost (Seasons 16 & 19)	Ian Watkins (Celebrity Big Brother 2007, won fourth place) is gay. Jackiey Budden (Celebrity BB 2007, first evictee) is a lesbian. Frankie Grande originally appeared on the sixteenth season of the American version of the show. India Willoughby is the first transgender housemate on the celebrity edition. Shane Jenek is better known as his drag persona, Courtney Act.
2001–2018	Celebrity Big Brother (British TV series)	Channel 4 Channel 5	Angie Bowie (Season 17)	Ian Watkins (Celebrity Big Brother 2007, won fourth place) is gay. Jackiey Budden (Celebrity BB 2007, first evictee) is a lesbian. Frankie Grande originally appeared on the sixteenth season of the American version of the show. India Willoughby is the first transgender housemate on the celebrity edition. Shane Jenek is better known as his drag persona, Courtney Act.
2001–2018	Celebrity Big Brother (British TV series)	Channel 4 Channel 5	Christopher Maloney (Season 17)	Ian Watkins (Celebrity Big Brother 2007, won fourth place) is gay. Jackiey Budden (Celebrity BB 2007, first evictee) is a lesbian. Frankie Grande originally appeared on the sixteenth season of the American version of the show. India Willoughby is the first transgender housemate on the celebrity edition. Shane Jenek is better known as his drag persona, Courtney Act.
2001–2018	Celebrity Big Brother (British TV series)	Channel 4 Channel 5	Christopher Biggins (Season 18)	Ian Watkins (Celebrity Big Brother 2007, won fourth place) is gay. Jackiey Budden (Celebrity BB 2007, first evictee) is a lesbian. Frankie Grande originally appeared on the sixteenth season of the American version of the show. India Willoughby is the first transgender housemate on the celebrity edition. Shane Jenek is better known as his drag persona, Courtney Act.
2001–2018	Celebrity Big Brother (British TV series)	Channel 4 Channel 5	Frankie Grande (Season 18)	Ian Watkins (Celebrity Big Brother 2007, won fourth place) is gay. Jackiey Budden (Celebrity BB 2007, first evictee) is a lesbian. Frankie Grande originally appeared on the sixteenth season of the American version of the show. India Willoughby is the first transgender housemate on the celebrity edition. Shane Jenek is better known as his drag persona, Courtney Act.
2001–2018	Celebrity Big Brother (British TV series)	Channel 4 Channel 5	Samantha Fox (Season 18)	Ian Watkins (Celebrity Big Brother 2007, won fourth place) is gay. Jackiey Budden (Celebrity BB 2007, first evictee) is a lesbian. Frankie Grande originally appeared on the sixteenth season of the American version of the show. India Willoughby is the first transgender housemate on the celebrity edition. Shane Jenek is better known as his drag persona, Courtney Act.
2001–2018	Celebrity Big Brother (British TV series)	Channel 4 Channel 5	Marnie Simpson (Season 18)	Ian Watkins (Celebrity Big Brother 2007, won fourth place) is gay. Jackiey Budden (Celebrity BB 2007, first evictee) is a lesbian. Frankie Grande originally appeared on the sixteenth season of the American version of the show. India Willoughby is the first transgender housemate on the celebrity edition. Shane Jenek is better known as his drag persona, Courtney Act.
2001–2018	Celebrity Big Brother (British TV series)	Channel 4 Channel 5	Jemma Lucy (Season 20)	Ian Watkins (Celebrity Big Brother 2007, won fourth place) is gay. Jackiey Budden (Celebrity BB 2007, first evictee) is a lesbian. Frankie Grande originally appeared on the sixteenth season of the American version of the show. India Willoughby is the first transgender housemate on the celebrity edition. Shane Jenek is better known as his drag persona, Courtney Act.
2001–2018	Celebrity Big Brother (British TV series)	Channel 4 Channel 5	Trisha Paytas (Season 20)	Ian Watkins (Celebrity Big Brother 2007, won fourth place) is gay. Jackiey Budden (Celebrity BB 2007, first evictee) is a lesbian. Frankie Grande originally appeared on the sixteenth season of the American version of the show. India Willoughby is the first transgender housemate on the celebrity edition. Shane Jenek is better known as his drag persona, Courtney Act.
2001–2018	Celebrity Big Brother (British TV series)	Channel 4 Channel 5	Amanda Barrie (Season 21)	Ian Watkins (Celebrity Big Brother 2007, won fourth place) is gay. Jackiey Budden (Celebrity BB 2007, first evictee) is a lesbian. Frankie Grande originally appeared on the sixteenth season of the American version of the show. India Willoughby is the first transgender housemate on the celebrity edition. Shane Jenek is better known as his drag persona, Courtney Act.
2001–2018	Celebrity Big Brother (British TV series)	Channel 4 Channel 5	India Willoughby (Season 21)	Ian Watkins (Celebrity Big Brother 2007, won fourth place) is gay. Jackiey Budden (Celebrity BB 2007, first evictee) is a lesbian. Frankie Grande originally appeared on the sixteenth season of the American version of the show. India Willoughby is the first transgender housemate on the celebrity edition. Shane Jenek is better known as his drag persona, Courtney Act.
2001–2018	Celebrity Big Brother (British TV series)	Channel 4 Channel 5	Shane Jenek (Season 21) Winner	Ian Watkins (Celebrity Big Brother 2007, won fourth place) is gay. Jackiey Budden (Celebrity BB 2007, first evictee) is a lesbian. Frankie Grande originally appeared on the sixteenth season of the American version of the show. India Willoughby is the first transgender housemate on the celebrity edition. Shane Jenek is better known as his drag persona, Courtney Act.
2001–2018	Celebrity Big Brother (British TV series)	Channel 4 Channel 5	Wayne Sleep (Season 21)	Ian Watkins (Celebrity Big Brother 2007, won fourth place) is gay. Jackiey Budden (Celebrity BB 2007, first evictee) is a lesbian. Frankie Grande originally appeared on the sixteenth season of the American version of the show. India Willoughby is the first transgender housemate on the celebrity edition. Shane Jenek is better known as his drag persona, Courtney Act.
2001–2018	Celebrity Big Brother (British TV series)	Channel 4 Channel 5	Rodrigo Alves (Season 22)	Ian Watkins (Celebrity Big Brother 2007, won fourth place) is gay. Jackiey Budden (Celebrity BB 2007, first evictee) is a lesbian. Frankie Grande originally appeared on the sixteenth season of the American version of the show. India Willoughby is the first transgender housemate on the celebrity edition. Shane Jenek is better known as his drag persona, Courtney Act.
2000–	Big Brother (American TV series	CBS	Bill "Bunky" Miller (season 2)	Bunky's husband at the time sent Bunky a letter during the show during Big Brother 2. Ivette's live-in girlfriend was interviewed on the show during Big Brother 6. Bunky and Marcellas were both eligible for Big Brother: All Stars, but only Marcellas made it in. Dustin and Joe were cast as hated ex-boyfriends on Big Brother 8. Joshua and Neil were originally "soulmates" on the show but Neil had to leave the House voluntarily for urgent personal reasons and Joshua selected formerly evicted Sharon as his new mate. Andy became the first openly gay winner in the American series. Frankie is the older half-brother of singer Ariana Grande. Zach Rance and Frankie Grande were the first same-sex showmance on the American version of the Big Brother series. Audrey Middleton is the first transgender HouseGuest to appear on the American version of the Big Brother series. Vanessa and Tiffany are sisters. Jason later returned for the first season of Big Brother: Over the Top, where he finished in second. Natalie came out as pansexual on a subsequent appearance on The Challenge. Kaycee became the first openly lesbian winner of the American series. Claire and Sarah Beth are both bisexual. Derek F is gay. Paulie Calafiore came out as bisexual on the second season of The Challenge:USA
2000–	Big Brother (American TV series	CBS	Marcellas Reynolds (seasons 3 & 7)	
2000–	Big Brother (American TV series	CBS	Will Wikle (season 5)	
2000–	Big Brother (American TV series	CBS	Ivette Corredero (season 6) Runner-up	
2000–	Big Brother (American TV series	CBS	Beau Beasley (Season 6)	
2000–	Big Brother (American TV series	CBS	Dustin Erikstrup (season 8)	
2000–	Big Brother (American TV series	CBS	Joe Barber (season 8)	
2000–	Big Brother (American TV series	CBS	Joshuah Welch (season 9)	
2000–	Big Brother (American TV series	CBS	Neil Garcia (season 9)	
2000–	Big Brother (American TV series	CBS	Steven Daigle (season 10)	
2000–	Big Brother (American TV series	CBS	Kevin Campbell (seasons 11 & 22)	
2000–	Big Brother (American TV series	CBS	Lydia Tavera (season 11)	
2000–	Big Brother (American TV series	CBS	Michele Noonan (season 11)	
2000–	Big Brother (American TV series	CBS	Ragan Fox (season 12)	
2000–	Big Brother (American TV series	CBS	Annie Whittington (season 12)	
2000–	Big Brother (American TV series	CBS	Lawon Exum (season 13)	
2000–	Big Brother (American TV series	CBS	Jenn Arroyo (season 14)	
2000–	Big Brother (American TV series	CBS	Wil Heuser (season 14)	
2000–	Big Brother (American TV series	CBS	Andy Herren (season 15) Winner	
2000–	Big Brother (American TV series	CBS	Frankie Grande (season 16)	
2000–	Big Brother (American TV series	CBS	Zach Rance (season 16)	
2000–	Big Brother (American TV series	CBS	Audrey Middleton (season 17)	
2000–	Big Brother (American TV series	CBS	Jason Roy (season 17)	
2000–	Big Brother (American TV series	CBS	Vanessa Rousso (season 17)	
2000–	Big Brother (American TV series	CBS	Paulie Calafiore (season 18)	
2000–	Big Brother (American TV series	CBS	Jozea Flores (season 18)	
2000–	Big Brother (American TV series	CBS	Natalie Negrotti (season 18)	
2000–	Big Brother (American TV series	CBS	Tiffany Rousso (season 18)	
2000–	Big Brother (American TV series	CBS	Ramses Soto (season 19)	
2000–	Big Brother (American TV series	CBS	JC Monduix (season 20)	
2000–	Big Brother (American TV series	CBS	Kaycee Clark (season 20) Winner	
2000–	Big Brother (American TV series	CBS	Christie Murphy (season 21)	
2000–	Big Brother (American TV series	CBS	Tommy Bracco (season 21)	
2000–	Big Brother (American TV series	CBS	Claire Rehfuss (season 23)	
2000–	Big Brother (American TV series	CBS	Derek Frazier (season 23)	
2000–	Big Brother (American TV series	CBS	Kyland Young (season 23)	
2000–	Big Brother (American TV series	CBS	Sarah Beth Steagall (season 23)	
2000–	Big Brother (American TV series	CBS	Matt Turner (season 24)	
2000–	Big Brother (American TV series	CBS	Michael Bruner (season 24)	
2000–	Big Brother (American TV series	CBS	Nicole Layog (season 24)	
2000–	Gran Hermano (Spanish TV series)	Telecinco	Mari Arrabal (season 2)	Mari Arrabal, Noemí Ungría, Natacha Jaitt, Carolina Sobé, Aritz Castro and Miguel Vilas are bisexuals. Raquel Morillas, Elba Guallarte, Rafa López, Arturo Sisniega, Nagore Robles, Laura Selva, Ángela Castro, Dámaso Ángulo, Álvaro Vargas and Han Wang are lesbians and gays. Nicky Villanueva, Amor Romeira, Hans Marcus and Desirée Rodríguez are transgender.
2000–	Gran Hermano (Spanish TV series)	Telecinco	Noemí Ungría (season 3)	Mari Arrabal, Noemí Ungría, Natacha Jaitt, Carolina Sobé, Aritz Castro and Miguel Vilas are bisexuals. Raquel Morillas, Elba Guallarte, Rafa López, Arturo Sisniega, Nagore Robles, Laura Selva, Ángela Castro, Dámaso Ángulo, Álvaro Vargas and Han Wang are lesbians and gays. Nicky Villanueva, Amor Romeira, Hans Marcus and Desirée Rodríguez are transgender.
2000–	Gran Hermano (Spanish TV series)	Telecinco	Raquel Morillas (season 3)	Mari Arrabal, Noemí Ungría, Natacha Jaitt, Carolina Sobé, Aritz Castro and Miguel Vilas are bisexuals. Raquel Morillas, Elba Guallarte, Rafa López, Arturo Sisniega, Nagore Robles, Laura Selva, Ángela Castro, Dámaso Ángulo, Álvaro Vargas and Han Wang are lesbians and gays. Nicky Villanueva, Amor Romeira, Hans Marcus and Desirée Rodríguez are transgender.
2000–	Gran Hermano (Spanish TV series)	Telecinco	Elba Guallarte (season 3)	Mari Arrabal, Noemí Ungría, Natacha Jaitt, Carolina Sobé, Aritz Castro and Miguel Vilas are bisexuals. Raquel Morillas, Elba Guallarte, Rafa López, Arturo Sisniega, Nagore Robles, Laura Selva, Ángela Castro, Dámaso Ángulo, Álvaro Vargas and Han Wang are lesbians and gays. Nicky Villanueva, Amor Romeira, Hans Marcus and Desirée Rodríguez are transgender.
2000–	Gran Hermano (Spanish TV series)	Telecinco	Rafa López (season 4)	Mari Arrabal, Noemí Ungría, Natacha Jaitt, Carolina Sobé, Aritz Castro and Miguel Vilas are bisexuals. Raquel Morillas, Elba Guallarte, Rafa López, Arturo Sisniega, Nagore Robles, Laura Selva, Ángela Castro, Dámaso Ángulo, Álvaro Vargas and Han Wang are lesbians and gays. Nicky Villanueva, Amor Romeira, Hans Marcus and Desirée Rodríguez are transgender.
2000–	Gran Hermano (Spanish TV series)	Telecinco	Nicky Villanueva (season 6)	Mari Arrabal, Noemí Ungría, Natacha Jaitt, Carolina Sobé, Aritz Castro and Miguel Vilas are bisexuals. Raquel Morillas, Elba Guallarte, Rafa López, Arturo Sisniega, Nagore Robles, Laura Selva, Ángela Castro, Dámaso Ángulo, Álvaro Vargas and Han Wang are lesbians and gays. Nicky Villanueva, Amor Romeira, Hans Marcus and Desirée Rodríguez are transgender.
2000–	Gran Hermano (Spanish TV series)	Telecinco	Natacha Jaitt (season 6)	Mari Arrabal, Noemí Ungría, Natacha Jaitt, Carolina Sobé, Aritz Castro and Miguel Vilas are bisexuals. Raquel Morillas, Elba Guallarte, Rafa López, Arturo Sisniega, Nagore Robles, Laura Selva, Ángela Castro, Dámaso Ángulo, Álvaro Vargas and Han Wang are lesbians and gays. Nicky Villanueva, Amor Romeira, Hans Marcus and Desirée Rodríguez are transgender.
2000–	Gran Hermano (Spanish TV series)	Telecinco	Arturo Sisniega (season 7)	Mari Arrabal, Noemí Ungría, Natacha Jaitt, Carolina Sobé, Aritz Castro and Miguel Vilas are bisexuals. Raquel Morillas, Elba Guallarte, Rafa López, Arturo Sisniega, Nagore Robles, Laura Selva, Ángela Castro, Dámaso Ángulo, Álvaro Vargas and Han Wang are lesbians and gays. Nicky Villanueva, Amor Romeira, Hans Marcus and Desirée Rodríguez are transgender.
2000–	Gran Hermano (Spanish TV series)	Telecinco	Amor Romeira (season 9)	Mari Arrabal, Noemí Ungría, Natacha Jaitt, Carolina Sobé, Aritz Castro and Miguel Vilas are bisexuals. Raquel Morillas, Elba Guallarte, Rafa López, Arturo Sisniega, Nagore Robles, Laura Selva, Ángela Castro, Dámaso Ángulo, Álvaro Vargas and Han Wang are lesbians and gays. Nicky Villanueva, Amor Romeira, Hans Marcus and Desirée Rodríguez are transgender.
2000–	Gran Hermano (Spanish TV series)	Telecinco	Nagore Robles (season 11)	Mari Arrabal, Noemí Ungría, Natacha Jaitt, Carolina Sobé, Aritz Castro and Miguel Vilas are bisexuals. Raquel Morillas, Elba Guallarte, Rafa López, Arturo Sisniega, Nagore Robles, Laura Selva, Ángela Castro, Dámaso Ángulo, Álvaro Vargas and Han Wang are lesbians and gays. Nicky Villanueva, Amor Romeira, Hans Marcus and Desirée Rodríguez are transgender.
2000–	Gran Hermano (Spanish TV series)	Telecinco	Carolina Sobé (season 11)	Mari Arrabal, Noemí Ungría, Natacha Jaitt, Carolina Sobé, Aritz Castro and Miguel Vilas are bisexuals. Raquel Morillas, Elba Guallarte, Rafa López, Arturo Sisniega, Nagore Robles, Laura Selva, Ángela Castro, Dámaso Ángulo, Álvaro Vargas and Han Wang are lesbians and gays. Nicky Villanueva, Amor Romeira, Hans Marcus and Desirée Rodríguez are transgender.
2000–	Gran Hermano (Spanish TV series)	Telecinco	Laura Selva (season 11)	Mari Arrabal, Noemí Ungría, Natacha Jaitt, Carolina Sobé, Aritz Castro and Miguel Vilas are bisexuals. Raquel Morillas, Elba Guallarte, Rafa López, Arturo Sisniega, Nagore Robles, Laura Selva, Ángela Castro, Dámaso Ángulo, Álvaro Vargas and Han Wang are lesbians and gays. Nicky Villanueva, Amor Romeira, Hans Marcus and Desirée Rodríguez are transgender.
2000–	Gran Hermano (Spanish TV series)	Telecinco	Ángela Castro (season 11)	Mari Arrabal, Noemí Ungría, Natacha Jaitt, Carolina Sobé, Aritz Castro and Miguel Vilas are bisexuals. Raquel Morillas, Elba Guallarte, Rafa López, Arturo Sisniega, Nagore Robles, Laura Selva, Ángela Castro, Dámaso Ángulo, Álvaro Vargas and Han Wang are lesbians and gays. Nicky Villanueva, Amor Romeira, Hans Marcus and Desirée Rodríguez are transgender.
2000–	Gran Hermano (Spanish TV series)	Telecinco	Hans Marcus (season 11)	Mari Arrabal, Noemí Ungría, Natacha Jaitt, Carolina Sobé, Aritz Castro and Miguel Vilas are bisexuals. Raquel Morillas, Elba Guallarte, Rafa López, Arturo Sisniega, Nagore Robles, Laura Selva, Ángela Castro, Dámaso Ángulo, Álvaro Vargas and Han Wang are lesbians and gays. Nicky Villanueva, Amor Romeira, Hans Marcus and Desirée Rodríguez are transgender.
2000–	Gran Hermano (Spanish TV series)	Telecinco	Dámaso Ángulo (season 12)	Mari Arrabal, Noemí Ungría, Natacha Jaitt, Carolina Sobé, Aritz Castro and Miguel Vilas are bisexuals. Raquel Morillas, Elba Guallarte, Rafa López, Arturo Sisniega, Nagore Robles, Laura Selva, Ángela Castro, Dámaso Ángulo, Álvaro Vargas and Han Wang are lesbians and gays. Nicky Villanueva, Amor Romeira, Hans Marcus and Desirée Rodríguez are transgender.
2000–	Gran Hermano (Spanish TV series)	Telecinco	Desirée Rodríguez (season 14)	Mari Arrabal, Noemí Ungría, Natacha Jaitt, Carolina Sobé, Aritz Castro and Miguel Vilas are bisexuals. Raquel Morillas, Elba Guallarte, Rafa López, Arturo Sisniega, Nagore Robles, Laura Selva, Ángela Castro, Dámaso Ángulo, Álvaro Vargas and Han Wang are lesbians and gays. Nicky Villanueva, Amor Romeira, Hans Marcus and Desirée Rodríguez are transgender.
2000–	Gran Hermano (Spanish TV series)	Telecinco	Álvaro Vargas (season 14)	Mari Arrabal, Noemí Ungría, Natacha Jaitt, Carolina Sobé, Aritz Castro and Miguel Vilas are bisexuals. Raquel Morillas, Elba Guallarte, Rafa López, Arturo Sisniega, Nagore Robles, Laura Selva, Ángela Castro, Dámaso Ángulo, Álvaro Vargas and Han Wang are lesbians and gays. Nicky Villanueva, Amor Romeira, Hans Marcus and Desirée Rodríguez are transgender.
2000–	Gran Hermano (Spanish TV series)	Telecinco	Aritz Castro (season 16)	Mari Arrabal, Noemí Ungría, Natacha Jaitt, Carolina Sobé, Aritz Castro and Miguel Vilas are bisexuals. Raquel Morillas, Elba Guallarte, Rafa López, Arturo Sisniega, Nagore Robles, Laura Selva, Ángela Castro, Dámaso Ángulo, Álvaro Vargas and Han Wang are lesbians and gays. Nicky Villanueva, Amor Romeira, Hans Marcus and Desirée Rodríguez are transgender.
2000–	Gran Hermano (Spanish TV series)	Telecinco	Han Wang (season 16)	Mari Arrabal, Noemí Ungría, Natacha Jaitt, Carolina Sobé, Aritz Castro and Miguel Vilas are bisexuals. Raquel Morillas, Elba Guallarte, Rafa López, Arturo Sisniega, Nagore Robles, Laura Selva, Ángela Castro, Dámaso Ángulo, Álvaro Vargas and Han Wang are lesbians and gays. Nicky Villanueva, Amor Romeira, Hans Marcus and Desirée Rodríguez are transgender.
2000–	Gran Hermano (Spanish TV series)	Telecinco	Miguel Vilas (season 17)	Mari Arrabal, Noemí Ungría, Natacha Jaitt, Carolina Sobé, Aritz Castro and Miguel Vilas are bisexuals. Raquel Morillas, Elba Guallarte, Rafa López, Arturo Sisniega, Nagore Robles, Laura Selva, Ángela Castro, Dámaso Ángulo, Álvaro Vargas and Han Wang are lesbians and gays. Nicky Villanueva, Amor Romeira, Hans Marcus and Desirée Rodríguez are transgender.
2000–2008	Trading Spaces	TLC; Discovery Home	Vern Yip	
2000–2001	American High	Fox (2000); PBS (2001)	Brad Krefman	Series follows high school students.
2007-2021	Keeping Up with the Kardashians	E!	Caitlyn Jenner	Jenner, who was part of the main cast until 2017 (and made guest appearances in later seasons), came out as transgender in 2015.
2005–2018	Canada's Worst Driver	Discovery Channel	Kevin Simmons (Driver;Season 8 & 9:Ever) Worst Driver, Worst Driver Ever	Kevin and Lenny are boyfriends. Lenny nominates Kevin has the worst driver in Season 8, who goes on to be declared a joint Worst Driver. They return for the "all-stars" season Canada's Worst Driver Ever where Kevin is declared the worst driver ever.
2005–2018	Canada's Worst Driver	Discovery Channel	Lenny Stone (Nominator; Season 8 & 9:Ever)	Kevin and Lenny are boyfriends. Lenny nominates Kevin has the worst driver in Season 8, who goes on to be declared a joint Worst Driver. They return for the "all-stars" season Canada's Worst Driver Ever where Kevin is declared the worst driver ever.

== 2010s ==
Year	Title	Network	Cast member	Notes
2014–	Brave New Girls	E! Canada	Jenna Talackova	This reality show, based around Talackova's life, was filmed in summer 2013 as Talackova moved to Toronto to pursue a modeling career. The series, produced by Peacock Alley Entertainment, premiered on E! Canada in January 2014.
2015	Becoming Us	ABC Family	Carly Lehwald	Reality show starring Carly Lehwald focusing on a family whose father has come out as a trans woman.
2018–	Ex on the Beach	MTV	Paulie Calafiore (season 1)	Paulie came out as bisexual on the second season of The Challenge:USA
2018–	Ex on the Beach	MTV	Cheyenne Parker (season 2)	Cheyenne originally appeared on Fire Island.
2018–	Ex on the Beach	MTV	Cory Zwierzynski (season 2)	Cory originally appeared on What Happens at The Abbey.
2018–	Ex on the Beach	MTV	Jozea Flores (season 2)	Jozea originally competed on Big Brother 18. Jozea and Rob are exes.
2018–	Ex on the Beach	MTV	Murray Swanby (season 2)	Murray originally appeared on What Happens at The Abbey. Murray is also exes with both Cheyenne and Cory.
2018–	Ex on the Beach	MTV	Rob Tini (season 2)	
2018–	Ex on the Beach	MTV	Aubrey O'Day (season 3)	Aubrey and Lisa are exes.
2018–	Ex on the Beach	MTV	Billy Reilich (season 3)	Billy originally appeared on What Happens at The Abbey.
2018–	Ex on the Beach	MTV	Cara Cooper (season 3)	Cara is transgender and is Billy's ex.
2018–	Ex on the Beach	MTV	Lisa Coffey (season 3)	
2018–	Ex on the Beach	MTV	Tyler Garrigus (season 3)	
2018–	Ex on the Beach	MTV	Adore Delano (season 4)	Adore originally appeared on American Idol, RuPaul's Drag Race, and RuPaul's Drag Race All Stars.
2018–	Ex on the Beach	MTV	Ashley Ceasar (season 4)	
2018–	Ex on the Beach	MTV	Jakk Maddox (season 4)	
2018–	Ex on the Beach	MTV	La Demi Martinez (season 4)	
2018–	Ex on the Beach	MTV	Laurel Stucky (season 4)	
2018–	Ex on the Beach	MTV	Marlon Williams (season 4)	
2018–	Ex on the Beach	MTV	Nicole Zanatta (season 4)	
2018–	Ex on the Beach	MTV	Sydney Langston (season 4)	
2018–	Ex on the Beach	MTV	Todd Mauer (season 4)	
2018–	Ex on the Beach	MTV	Trenton Clark (season 4)	
2018–	Ex on the Beach	MTV	Tyler Ash (season 4)	
2018–	Ex on the Beach	MTV	Arisce Wanzer (season 5)	
2018–	Ex on the Beach	MTV	David Barta (season 5)	
2018–	Ex on the Beach	MTV	Jonathan Troncoso (season 5)	
2018–	Ex on the Beach	MTV	Joelle Brian (season 5)	
2018–	Ex on the Beach	MTV	Kyra Green (season 5)	
2018–	Ex on the Beach	MTV	Emily Salch (season 5)	
2018–	Ex on the Beach	MTV	Mike Mulderrig (season 5)	
2018	My House	Viceland	Tati 007	On NYC ball culture. Tati is a trans woman.
2018	My House	Viceland	Alex Mugler	Alex is gay.
2018	My House	Viceland	Jelani Mizrahi	Jelani is gay.
2018	My House	Viceland	Precious Ebony	Precious is genderfluid.
2018	My House	Viceland	Relish Milan	Relish is gay.
2018	Holiday Gingerbread Showdown	Food Network	Sean Patrick Henry (season 1)	
2018	Haunted Gingerbread Showdown	Food Network	Steve Konopelski (season 1)	
2018–	Celebrity Big Brother (American TV series)	CBS	Ross Mathews (season 1)	Ross is openly gay.
2018–	Celebrity Big Brother (American TV series)	CBS	Brandi Glanville (season 1)	Brandi is bisexual.
2018–	Celebrity Big Brother (American TV series)	CBS	Jonathan Bennett season 2	
2017–	Nate & Jeremiah by Design	HGTV	Nate Berkus (season 1,2,&3)	Nate and Jeremiah are married with two kids.
2017–	Nate & Jeremiah by Design	HGTV	Jeremiah Brent (season 1,2,&3)	
2018–	Love & Hip Hop: Miami	VH1	Trina	Trina is openly bisexual.
2018–	Love & Hip Hop: Miami	VH1	Bobby Lytes	Bobby is openly gay.
2018–	Love & Hip Hop: Miami	VH1	Miami Tip	Tip is openly bisexual and expresses sexual interest in Gunplay's girlfriend Keyara.
2018–	Love & Hip Hop: Miami	VH1	Jeffrey White	Jeffrey is Bobby's boyfriend.
2018–	Love & Hip Hop: Miami	VH1	Malik Williams	Malik is Jeffrey's ex, who comes out for the first time publicly during the season.
2017–	Christmas Cookie Challenge	Food Network	Ricky Webster (season 2)	Ricky is the winner of season 2, episode 4. Alex has a drag persona named Plenty O'Smiles in season 3, episode 1.
2017–	Christmas Cookie Challenge	Food Network	Adam Kopfeman (season 2)	Ricky is the winner of season 2, episode 4. Alex has a drag persona named Plenty O'Smiles in season 3, episode 1.
2017–	Christmas Cookie Challenge	Food Network	Alex Copeland (season 3)	Ricky is the winner of season 2, episode 4. Alex has a drag persona named Plenty O'Smiles in season 3, episode 1.
2017–	Christmas Cookie Challenge	Food Network	Brian Muffloetto (season 4)	Ricky is the winner of season 2, episode 4. Alex has a drag persona named Plenty O'Smiles in season 3, episode 1.
2017–	Christmas Cookie Challenge	Food Network	Jordan Smith (season 4)	Ricky is the winner of season 2, episode 4. Alex has a drag persona named Plenty O'Smiles in season 3, episode 1.
2017	Halloween Wars: Hayride of Horror	Food Network	Zac Young	
2016–2017	American Grit	Fox	Michael Wilson Morgan (season 2)	Michael is the only LGBT competitor to compete on either season 1 and season 2 - making him the only LGBT to compete on the show. Michael was the runner-up on season 2.
2016–	The Boulet Brothers' Dragula	OutTV (S2–)	The Boulet Brothers	The Boulet Brothers judge a competition for the world's next drag supermonster. Most of the contestants have been gay/queer men.
2016–	The Boulet Brothers' Dragula	OutTV (S2–)	Contestants	The Boulet Brothers judge a competition for the world's next drag supermonster. Most of the contestants have been gay/queer men.
2016–	The Boulet Brothers' Dragula	OutTV (S2–)	Various guest judges	The Boulet Brothers judge a competition for the world's next drag supermonster. Most of the contestants have been gay/queer men.
2016–	Leave It to Stevie	VH1	Renaye Diaz	Renaye is a lesbian and the ex-girlfriend of rapper Siya. Although never revealed on the show, Mimi prefers "no labels" and has been in relationships with men and women as well as a trans man. Alexis is a lesbian in a relationship with Tyra B.
2016–	Leave It to Stevie	VH1	Mimi Faust	Renaye is a lesbian and the ex-girlfriend of rapper Siya. Although never revealed on the show, Mimi prefers "no labels" and has been in relationships with men and women as well as a trans man. Alexis is a lesbian in a relationship with Tyra B.
2016–	Leave It to Stevie	VH1	Alexis Branch	Renaye is a lesbian and the ex-girlfriend of rapper Siya. Although never revealed on the show, Mimi prefers "no labels" and has been in relationships with men and women as well as a trans man. Alexis is a lesbian in a relationship with Tyra B.
2016–	Escape the Night	YouTube Premium	Joey Graceffa	Presenter Graceffa is openly gay.
2016–	Escape the Night	YouTube Premium	Shane Dawson (Season 1)	Dawson is bisexual.
2016–	Escape the Night	YouTube Premium	Tyler Oakley (Season 2)	Oakley is openly gay, and won his season along with Russett who is openly bisexual.
2016–	Escape the Night	YouTube Premium	Andrea Russett (Season 2)	Oakley is openly gay, and won his season along with Russett who is openly bisexual.
2016–	Escape the Night	YouTube Premium	Manny MUA (Season 3)	MUA and Rock are both gay.
2016–	Escape the Night	YouTube Premium	Bretman Rock (Season 4)	MUA and Rock are both gay.
2016	Big Brother: Over the Top	CBS All Access	Danielle Lickey (season 1)	
2016	Big Brother: Over the Top	CBS All Access	Jason Roy (season 1)	Jason is gay. Kryssie is bisexual. Both made it to the final, where Kryssie came in third, and Jason came in second.
2016	Big Brother: Over the Top	CBS All Access	Kryssie Ridolfi (season 1)	Jason is gay. Kryssie is bisexual. Both made it to the final, where Kryssie came in third, and Jason came in second.
2016	Stevie J & Joseline: Go Hollywood	VH1	Joseline Hernandez	Joseline is openly bisexual.
2016	Stevie J & Joseline: Go Hollywood	VH1	Mimi Faust	Although never revealed on the show, Mimi prefers "no labels" and has been in relationships with men and women as well as a trans man.
2015–	I Am Jazz	TLC	Jazz Jennings	Reality series on life of transgender teen and her family.
2015–	Halloween Baking Championship	Food Network	Zac Young	
2015–	Halloween Baking Championship	Food Network	Ray Vizcaino (season 3)	
2015–	Halloween Baking Championship	Food Network	Andrew Fuller (season 4)	
2015–2016	I Am Cait	E!	Caitlyn Jenner	Reality series focusing on gender transition of Olympic gold medalist Caitlyn Jenner.
2014	Big Brother Brasil 14	Globo	Aline Dahlen	
2014	Big Brother Brasil 14	Globo	Clara Aguiar	
2014	Big Brother Brasil 14	Globo	Vagner Lara	
2014	Big Brother Brasil 14	Globo	Vanessa Mesquita	
2014–	Opposite Worlds	Syfy	Jeffry Celle	Jeffry is on "Team Chronos" which started the game in "Future World".
2014–	King of the Nerds	TBS	Xander Jeanneret season 2	Xander is a gay gamer, or "gaymer" for short.
2014–2016	Rich Kids of Beverly Hills	E!	Jonny Drubel	
2014–	Holiday Baking Championship	Food Network	Steve Konopelski (season 2)	
2014–	Holiday Baking Championship	Food Network	Joshua Livsey season 4	
2014–2017	K. Michelle: My Life	VH1	K. Michelle	K is openly bisexual and reveals her ex-girlfriend Melicia in the third season.
2014–2017	K. Michelle: My Life	VH1	Jonathan Fernandez	Jonathan is openly gay and refers to himself as K's "gay husband".
2014–2017	The Amazing Race China	Shenzhen TV	Jin Xing (season 3)	Jin Xing is a trans woman.
2014–	Love & Hip Hop: Hollywood	VH1	Moniece Slaughter	Moniece is openly bisexual and is in a relationship with A.D.
2014–	Love & Hip Hop: Hollywood	VH1	Nikki Mudarris	Nikki enters a relationship with Rosa in the third season.
2014–	Love & Hip Hop: Hollywood	VH1	Miles Brock	Miles is bisexual and is introduced as being in a long-term relationship with Milan.
2014–	Love & Hip Hop: Hollywood	VH1	Milan Christopher	Milan is openly gay.
2014–	Love & Hip Hop: Hollywood	VH1	Jason Lee	Jason is openly gay.
2014–	Love & Hip Hop: Hollywood	VH1	Rosa Acosta	Rosa is openly bisexual.
2014–	Love & Hip Hop: Hollywood	VH1	Zellswag	Zell is sexually fluid.
2014–	Love & Hip Hop: Hollywood	VH1	Alexis Skyy	Alexis is openly bisexual and has a flirtation with A.D.
2014–	Love & Hip Hop: Hollywood	VH1	A.D. Diggs	A.D. is openly lesbian and Moniece's girlfriend.
2014–	Love & Hip Hop: Hollywood	VH1	Misster Ray	Ray is openly gay and introduces his boyfriend, Vic the Leo.
2014–	Love & Hip Hop: Hollywood	VH1	K. Michelle	K is openly bisexual, and at the reunion, expresses sexual interest in Akbar's wife Sade.
2014–	Love & Hip Hop: Hollywood	VH1	JayWill	JayWill is openly bisexual and has a drag persona named Kandie.
2014-	Ex on the Beach UK	MTV	Jemma Lucy (Season 3 & 5)	Jemma is bisexual and was the first female LGBTQ+ contestant of the series, the first LGBTQ+ ex arrival of the series and the first ever LGBTQ+ contestant of the series.
2014-	Ex on the Beach UK	MTV	Laura-Alicia Summers (Season 3)	Laura-Alicia is bisexual and was the first original LGBTQ+ cast member of the series.
2014-	Ex on the Beach UK	MTV	Marnie Simpson (Season 8)	Marnie is bisexual.
2014-	Ex on the Beach UK	MTV	Lorna Boswell (Season 8)	Lorna is bisexual.
2014-	Ex on the Beach UK	MTV	Bibi Machin (Season 8)	Bibi is bisexual.
2014-	Ex on the Beach UK	MTV	George Bebbington (Season 11)	George is bisexual and was the first LGBTQ+ male contestant of the series.
2013	Big Brother Brasil 13	Globo	Aslan Cabral	
2013–	Big Brother Canada	Slice; Global	Aneal Ramkissoon (season 1)	
2013–	Big Brother Canada	Slice; Global	Gary Levy (season 1, 5)	Gary was the runner up on his season.
2013–	Big Brother Canada	Slice; Global	Kenny Brain (season 2)	
2013–	Big Brother Canada	Slice; Global	Johnny Colatruglio (season 3)	
2013–	Big Brother Canada	Slice; Global	Risha Denner (season 3)	
2013–	Big Brother Canada	Slice; Global	Sarah Hanlon (season 3)	Sarah won her season.
2013–	Big Brother Canada	Slice; Global	Willow MacDonald (season 3)	
2013–	Big Brother Canada	Slice; Global	Kevin Robert Martin (season 3,5)	
2013–	Big Brother Canada	Slice; Global	Mitchell Moffit (season 4)	
2013–	Big Brother Canada	Slice; Global	Raul Manriquez (season 4)	
2013–	Big Brother Canada	Slice; Global	Sharry Ash (season 4)	
2013–	Big Brother Canada	Slice; Global	Tim Dormer (season 4)	
2013–	Big Brother Canada	Slice; Global	William Laprise Desbiens (season 5)	
2013–	Big Brother Canada	Slice; Global	Erica Hill (season 6)	
2013–	Big Brother Canada	Slice; Global	Johnny Mulder (season 6)	
2013–	Big Brother Canada	Slice; Global	Eddie Lin (season 7)	
2013–	Big Brother Canada	Slice; Global	Kiera Wallace (season 7)	
2013–	Big Brother Canada	Slice; Global	Kyra Shenker (season 7)	Kyra is the first non-binary person to be on the show.
2013–	Big Brother Canada	Slice; Global	Brooke Warnock (season 8)	
2013–	Big Brother Canada	Slice; Global	Carol Rosher (season 8)	
2013–	Big Brother Canada	Slice; Global	Breydon White (season 9)	
2013–	Big Brother Canada	Slice; Global	Latoya Anderson (season 9)	
2013–	Big Brother Canada	Slice; Global	Josh Farnworth (season 9)	
2013–	Big Brother Canada	Slice; Global	Julie Vu (season 9)	Julie is the first transgender person on the show.
2013–	Big Brother Canada	Slice; Global	Tina Thistle (season 9)	
2013–	Big Brother Canada	Slice; Global	Jay Northcott (season 10)	
2013–	Big Brother Canada	Slice; Global	Jessica Gowling (season 10)	
2013–	Big Brother Canada	Slice; Global	Josh Nash (season 10)	
2013–	Big Brother Canada	Slice; Global	Daniel Clarke (season 11)	
2013–	Big Brother Canada	Slice; Global	John-Michael Sosa (season 11)	
2013–	The Amazing Race Canada	CTV	Jamie Cumberland and Pierre Cadieux (season 1)	Jamie and Pierre are best friends.
2013–	The Amazing Race Canada	CTV	Laura Takahashi and Jackie Skinner (season 2)	Laura and Jackie are a married lesbian couple.
2013–	The Amazing Race Canada	CTV	Rex Harrington and Bob Hope (season 2)	Rex and Bob were engaged when the program aired.
2013–	The Amazing Race Canada	CTV	Ryan Steele and Rob Goddard (season 2)	Ryan and Rob are best friends. Despite both being openly gay, their sexualities were never mentioned during the airing of the program.
2013–	The Amazing Race Canada	CTV	Brent Sweeney and Sean Sweeney (season 3)	Brent and Sean are brothers and both openly gay.
2013–	The Amazing Race Canada	CTV	Hamilton Elliott (season 3)	Hamilton is a trans man and the first openly transgender contestant on either the Canadian or American edition of The Amazing Race. He competed with his fiancée, Michaelia Drever.
2013–	The Amazing Race Canada	CTV	Steph LeClair and Kristen McKenzie (season 4)	Steph and Kristen were the first female team to win The Amazing Race Canada, and the first lesbian couple team to win any edition of the Race worldwide.
2013–	The Amazing Race Canada	CTV	Sam Lambert and Paul Mitskopoulos (season 5)	Sam and Paul are a dating couple. They were the first gay male couple to win The Amazing Race Canada.
2013–	The Amazing Race Canada	CTV	Anthony Johnson & James Makokis (season 7)	Anthony & James are married.
2013–	The Amazing Race Canada	CTV	Craig Ramsay (season 8)	
2013–	The Amazing Race Canada	CTV	Gisele Shaw (season 9)	
2013–	The Amazing Race Canada	CTV	Jermaine Aranha & Justin Baird (season 9)	
2013–	The Amazing Race Canada	CTV	Kevin Martin (season 10)	
2013–	The Amazing Race Canada	CTV	Julia Viola & Olivia Curto (season 10)	
2013	Generation Cryo	MTV	Breeanna	Breeanna is an 18-year-old lesbian who was conceived via anonymous sperm donation. The series follows her attempts to meet her half-siblings and her biological father.
2013–	Houston Beauty	OWN	Mia Ryan	Mia is transgender.
2013–	Below Deck	Bravo	David Bradberry	
2013	Capture	The CW	James Wallington	James is a host for AfterBuzzTV.com where he recaps reality television shows.
2013	Capture	The CW	Rob Anderson	James is a host for AfterBuzzTV.com where he recaps reality television shows.
2013	Capture	The CW	Jacob Kosior	James is a host for AfterBuzzTV.com where he recaps reality television shows.
2013	72 Hours	TNT	Michael Holtz	Holtz is a former competitive swimmer and Mr. Gay Chicago 2011.
2013–	The Great Christmas Light Fight	ABC	J.W. and Jerome Salveson-Sangall (season 6)	
2013–	The Great Christmas Light Fight	ABC	David and Frank Nubar-Boyce (season 10)	
2013–	Storage Wars: New York	A&E	Chris Morelli	Professional and personal partners, Morelli and Eaton own a boutique together called "Frayed Knot".
2013–	Storage Wars: New York	A&E	Tad Eaton	Professional and personal partners, Morelli and Eaton own a boutique together called "Frayed Knot".
2013–2014	Bad Girls All-Star Battle	Oxygen	Florina "Flo" Kaja (season 1)	Jenn and Tiana both won their respective seasons. Flo finished second on her season.
2013–2014	Bad Girls All-Star Battle	Oxygen	Jenniffer "Jenn" Hardwick (season 1)	Jenn and Tiana both won their respective seasons. Flo finished second on her season.
2013–2014	Bad Girls All-Star Battle	Oxygen	Julie Ofcharsky (season 1)	Jenn and Tiana both won their respective seasons. Flo finished second on her season.
2013–2014	Bad Girls All-Star Battle	Oxygen	Raquel "Rocky" Santiago (seasons 1 & 2)	Jenn and Tiana both won their respective seasons. Flo finished second on her season.
2013–2014	Bad Girls All-Star Battle	Oxygen	Tiana Small (season 2)	Jenn and Tiana both won their respective seasons. Flo finished second on her season.
2013–2014	Bad Girls All-Star Battle	Oxygen	Shelly Hickman (season 2)	Jenn and Tiana both won their respective seasons. Flo finished second on her season.
2013–2014	Bad Girls All-Star Battle	Oxygen	Stephanie George (season 2)	Jenn and Tiana both won their respective seasons. Flo finished second on her season.
2012	Big Brother Brasil 12	Globo	Analice de Souza	
2012	Big Brother Brasil 12	Globo	João Carvalho	
2012	VIP Brother 4 (Bulgaria)	Nova TV	Lucy Diakovska	
2012–2018	Shahs of Sunset	Bravo	Reza Farahan	
2012–2014	The Amazing Race Philippines	TV5	Jervi Li (season 1)	Jervi Li is a trans woman also known as KaladKaren.
2012–2013	The Amazing Race Norge	TV 2	Julie Aamodt and Vichy Ericsson (season 1)	
2012–	Ink Master	Paramount Network	Jackie Jennings (season 3)	
2012–	Ink Master	Paramount Network	Randy Vollink (season 4)	
2012–	Ink Master	Paramount Network	Ty'Esha Reels (season 5)	
2012–	Ink Master	Paramount Network	Kevin Laroy (season 8)	
2012–	Ink Master	Paramount Network	Amanda Boone season 11	
2012	Full Metal Jousting	History	Jake Nodar	
2012–	Love & Hip Hop: Atlanta	VH1	Joseline Hernandez	Joseline is openly bisexual and has had sexual encounters with fellow cast members Mimi, Jessica Dime and Tommie.
2012–	Love & Hip Hop: Atlanta	VH1	Mimi Faust	Mimi prefers "no labels". She has had sexual encounters with Joseline, dated Chris and is dating a woman.
2012–	Love & Hip Hop: Atlanta	VH1	K. Michelle	Although only hinted on the show, K has identified as bisexual in interviews.
2012–	Love & Hip Hop: Atlanta	VH1	Ariane Davis	Ariane expresses her bi-curiosity in the second season, before coming out as a lesbian and dating DJ Toni K.
2012–	Love & Hip Hop: Atlanta	VH1	Kalenna Harper	Kalenna is openly bisexual and her relationship with Ashley is featured on the show.
2012–	Love & Hip Hop: Atlanta	VH1	Jessica Dime	Jessica's sexual tryst with Joseline is a major storyline in season four, and in season six, she dates Alexis Skyy.
2012–	Love & Hip Hop: Atlanta	VH1	Margeaux Simms	Margeaux is openly bisexual and dating model Merike Palmiste.
2012–	Love & Hip Hop: Atlanta	VH1	Ashley Nicole	Ashley Nicole is a lesbian and in the fourth season introduces her girlfriend of two years, Jamie.
2012–	Love & Hip Hop: Atlanta	VH1	Tommie Lee	Tommie's sexual tryst with Joseline is a major storyline in season five, although her sexuality is unclear.
2012–	Love & Hip Hop: Atlanta	VH1	D. Smith	D. Smith is a trans woman.
2012–	Love & Hip Hop: Atlanta	VH1	Chris Gould	Chris is a trans man.
2012–	Love & Hip Hop: Atlanta	VH1	Melissa Scott	Melissa is openly lesbian.
2012–	Love & Hip Hop: Atlanta	VH1	Jasmine Washington	Jasmine and Keanna are openly bisexual and in a polyamorous relationship with Rod.
2012–	Love & Hip Hop: Atlanta	VH1	Keanna Arnold	Jasmine and Keanna are openly bisexual and in a polyamorous relationship with Rod.
2012–	Love & Hip Hop: Atlanta	VH1	Erica Mena	Erica Mena is openly bisexual.
2012–	Love & Hip Hop: Atlanta	VH1	Pooh Hicks	Pooh is openly bisexual, and claims to have had a threesome with Karlie and her husband.
2012–	The Amazing Race Vietnam	VTV3	Hương Giang (seasons 3 & 5)	Hương Giang is a trans woman and the winner of season 3.
2011–2014, 2019–	The Amazing Race Australia	Seven Network; Network 10	Jonathan "Jono" Trenberth (season 3)	Tim and Rod were the winners of season 4.
2011–2014, 2019–	The Amazing Race Australia	Seven Network; Network 10	Tim and Rod Sattler-Jones (season 4)	Tim and Rod were the winners of season 4.
2011–2014, 2019–	The Amazing Race Australia	Seven Network; Network 10	Dwesmond Wiggan-Dann (season 5)	Tim and Rod were the winners of season 4.
2011–2014, 2019–	The Amazing Race Australia	Seven Network; Network 10	Marijana Rajcic and Chelsea Randall (season 5)	Tim and Rod were the winners of season 4.
2011–2014, 2019–	The Amazing Race Australia	Seven Network; Network 10	Sam Trenwith and Alex Hill (season 6)	Tim and Rod were the winners of season 4.
2011–2014, 2019–	The Amazing Race Australia	Seven Network; Network 10	Chace Tran (season 6)	Tim and Rod were the winners of season 4.
2011–2014, 2019–	The Amazing Race Australia	Seven Network; Network 10	Lauren Howells and Steph McGrath (season 6)	Tim and Rod were the winners of season 4.
2011–2014, 2019–	The Amazing Race Australia	Seven Network; Network 10	Pako Komira and Mori Perez (season 6)	Tim and Rod were the winners of season 4.
2011–2014, 2019–	The Amazing Race Australia	Seven Network; Network 10	George Mladenov (season 7)	Tim and Rod were the winners of season 4.
2011–	Love & Hip Hop: New York	VH1	Somaya Reese	Although never revealed on the show, Somaya is openly bisexual. After the show, she entered a relationship with rapper Lady Luck.
2011–	Love & Hip Hop: New York	VH1	Erica Mena	Erica Mena is openly bisexual.
2011–	Love & Hip Hop: New York	VH1	Cyn Santana	Cyn is introduced as Erica's girlfriend, the first woman she has ever been romantically involved with. After they break up, Cyn enters a relationship with a man, Ray.
2011–	Love & Hip Hop: New York	VH1	K. Michelle	Although never revealed on the show, K has identified as bisexual in interviews.
2011–	Love & Hip Hop: New York	VH1	Jhonni Blaze	Jhonni is openly bisexual and expresses sexual interest in fellow cast member Precious Paris.
2011–	Love & Hip Hop: New York	VH1	Cardi B	Cardi is openly bisexual.
2011–	Love & Hip Hop: New York	VH1	Mariahlynn	Mariahlynn is openly bisexual.
2011–	Love & Hip Hop: New York	VH1	Felicia "Snoop" Pearson	Snoop is openly lesbian.
2011–	Love & Hip Hop: New York	VH1	Hennessy Carolina	After her time on the show, Hennessy came out as a lesbian.
2011–	Love & Hip Hop: New York	VH1	J. Adrienne	J is introduced as Snoop's girlfriend, the first woman she has ever been romantically involved with. She claims she is only "gay for Snoop".
2011–	Love & Hip Hop: New York	VH1	Kim Wallace	Kim is openly lesbian and wears suits in a stud fashion.
2011–	Love & Hip Hop: New York	VH1	Anaís	Anaís is openly bisexual.
2011–	Love & Hip Hop: New York	VH1	Brittney Taylor	Brittney is openly bisexual.
2011–	Love & Hip Hop: New York	VH1	Jonathan Fernandez	Jonathan is openly gay.
2011–	Love & Hip Hop: New York	VH1	Trent Crews	Trent is Jonathan's boyfriend.
2011–	Love & Hip Hop: New York	VH1	Alexis Skyy	Alexis is openly bisexual.
2011–	Love & Hip Hop: New York	VH1	Sidney Starr	Sidney is a trans woman.
2011–	Platinum Hit	Bravo	Scotty Granger	Granger is the brother of NBA player Danny Granger and the great nephew of gospel singer Mahalia Jackson.
2011–	Face Off	Syfy	Marcel Banks (season 1)	
2011–	Face Off	Syfy	Gage Hubbard (seasons 1 & 11)	
2011–	Face Off	Syfy	Nora Hewitt (season 9)	
2011–	Face Off	Syfy	Ricky Vitus (season 9)	
2011–	The Voice	NBC	Vicci Martinez (season 1)	
2011–	The Voice	NBC	Frenchie Davis (season 1)	Frenchie Davis did not come out until after her season ended.
2011–	The Voice	NBC	Beverly McClellan (season 1)	
2011–	The Voice	NBC	Nakia (season 1)	
2011–	The Voice	NBC	Erin Martin (season 2)	
2011–	The Voice	NBC	Sarah Golden (season 2)	
2011–	Geordie Shore	MTV (UK and Ireland)	Nathan Henry	Henry initially identified as bisexual, before coming out as gay.
2011–	Geordie Shore	MTV (UK and Ireland)	Marnie Simpson	Simpson and Lamborghini are bisexual.
2011–	Geordie Shore	MTV (UK and Ireland)	Elettra Lamborghini	Simpson and Lamborghini are bisexual.
2011–2012	The Glee Project	Oxygen	Alex Newell (Season 1)	
2011	Fashion Hunters	Bravo	Wilson Payamps	
2011	Mad Fashion	Bravo	Chris March	
2011	Ton of Cash	VH1	Justin Derke	Derke is a cosmetologist and drag queen from Lansing, Michigan.
2011	The A-List: Dallas	Logo	Levi Crocker	
2011	The A-List: Dallas	Logo	James Doyle	
2011	The A-List: Dallas	Logo	Chase Hutchinson	
2011	The A-List: Dallas	Logo	Philip Willis	
2011	The A-List: Dallas	Logo	Taylor Garrett	
2011	Most Eligible Dallas	Bravo	Drew Ginsburg	Series follows single men and women in the Dallas area.
2011	Carson Nation	OWN	Carson Kressley	Former Queer Eye "fashion guy" travels from town to town doling out fashion makeovers.
2011	Big Brother Brasil 11	Globo	Ariadna Thalia	
2011	Big Brother Brasil 11	Globo	Daniel Rolim	
2011	Big Brother Brasil 11	Globo	Diana Balsini	
2011	Big Brother Brasil 11	Globo	Lucival França	
2011	Pretty Hurts	Logo	Rand Rusher	Rusher is a registered nurse who specializes in cosmetic injectables. Meeuwsen is the chief executive officer of Rusher's medical practice. The two were a couple for twelve years but are no longer romantically involved.
2011	Pretty Hurts	Logo	Curt Meeuwsen	Rusher is a registered nurse who specializes in cosmetic injectables. Meeuwsen is the chief executive officer of Rusher's medical practice. The two were a couple for twelve years but are no longer romantically involved.
2011	Your OWN Show: Oprah's Search for the Next TV Star	OWN	Ryan O'Connor	
2010–	The Only Way Is Essex	ITV2	Harry Derbidge	In series 1, openly gay Harry Derbidge is introduced as the cousin of Amy Childs, one of the show's main cast members, and reappears throughout the series. Due to the demands from fans and his unexpected popularity, Derbidge was made a secondary cast member in series 2 and appeared in the opening credits.
2010–	Hair Battle Spectacular	Bravo	Derek J	Derek J is a fantasy hair stylist and judge.
2010–	Hair Battle Spectacular	Bravo	Kirby Keomysay, AKA "Nostradamus" (season 2)	Keomysay is the winner of season 2.
2010–	The Real Housewives of Beverly Hills	Bravo	Taylor Armstrong (seasons 1–3; guest 4–6)	
2010–	The Real Housewives of Beverly Hills	Bravo	Brandi Glanville (seasons 3–5; guest 2, 6, 9–10)	
2010–	The Real Housewives of Beverly Hills	Bravo	Cedric Martinez (season 1)	Martinez was the "permanent house guest" of housewife Lisa VanderPump.
2010–	Next Great Baker	TLC	Gregory Soriano (season 1) and Chad Fitzgerald (season 2)	
2010–2012	Girls Who Like Boys Who Like Boys	Sundance Channel	Joel Derfner (season 1)	Season one follows the lives of four women and their gay best friends in New York City.
2010–2012	Girls Who Like Boys Who Like Boys	Sundance Channel	Sahil Farooqi (season 1)	
2010–2012	Girls Who Like Boys Who Like Boys	Sundance Channel	David Munk (season 1)	
2010–2012	Girls Who Like Boys Who Like Boys	Sundance Channel	Nathan Hale Williams (season 1)	
2010–2012	Girls Who Like Boys Who Like Boys	Sundance Channel	Jared Allman (season 2)	For season two the series moves to Nashville, Tennessee with an entirely new cast.
2010–2012	Girls Who Like Boys Who Like Boys	Sundance Channel	Peter Depp (season 2)	For season two the series moves to Nashville, Tennessee with an entirely new cast.
2010–2012	Girls Who Like Boys Who Like Boys	Sundance Channel	Shane Stevens (season 2)	For season two the series moves to Nashville, Tennessee with an entirely new cast.
2010–2012	Girls Who Like Boys Who Like Boys	Sundance Channel	Brent Oscar Young (season 2)	For season two the series moves to Nashville, Tennessee with an entirely new cast.
2010–	Top Chef: Just Desserts	Bravo	Yigit Pura (season 1)	
2010–	Top Chef: Just Desserts	Bravo	Vanarin Kuch (season 2)	
2010–	Top Chef: Just Desserts	Bravo	Craig Poirier (season 2)	
2010–	Top Chef: Just Desserts	Bravo	Lina Biancamano (season 2)	
2010–	Top Chef: Just Desserts	Bravo	Orlando Santos (season 2)	
2010–2012	Bachelor Pad	ABC	Krisily Kennedy (season one)	
2010–	The Fabulous Beekman Boys	Planet Green	Josh Kilmer-Purcell	Series follows author and advertising executive Kilmer-Purcell and his partner Ridge, a former Martha Stewart Omnimedia executive and geriatric physician, as they work to convert their weekend farm into a profitable brand, Beekman 1802.
2010–	The Fabulous Beekman Boys	Planet Green	Brent Ridge	Series follows author and advertising executive Kilmer-Purcell and his partner Ridge, a former Martha Stewart Omnimedia executive and geriatric physician, as they work to convert their weekend farm into a profitable brand, Beekman 1802.
2010–	The Fabulous Beekman Boys	Planet Green	John Hall	John Hall (aka Farmer John) brought his goat herd to the farm and assists with the farm's operations.
2010–	The Fabulous Beekman Boys	Planet Green	Doug Plummer	Plummer and Roberts are their neighbors and owners of the American Hotel in Sharon Springs, New York, where the series is set.
2010–	The Fabulous Beekman Boys	Planet Green	Garth Roberts	Plummer and Roberts are their neighbors and owners of the American Hotel in Sharon Springs, New York, where the series is set.
2010	Big Brother Brasil 10	Globo	Angélica Morango	
2010	Big Brother Brasil 10	Globo	Dicesar Ferreira	
2010	Big Brother Brasil 10	Globo	Serginho Orgastic	
2010–	Love Games: Bad Girls Need Love Too	Oxygen Network	Lea Beaulieu (season 2)	
2010–	Love Games: Bad Girls Need Love Too	Oxygen Network	Judi Jai (season 3)	
2010–	Love Games: Bad Girls Need Love Too	Oxygen Network	Sydney Steinfeldt (season 3)	
2010–	The Real L Word	Showtime	Rose Garcia	Like the similarly titled fictional series The L Word, this series follows the lives of several lesbians living in Los Angeles.
2010–	The Real L Word	Showtime	Jill Sloane Goldstein	
2010–	The Real L Word	Showtime	Mikey Koffman	
2010–	The Real L Word	Showtime	Whitney Mixter	
2010–	The Real L Word	Showtime	Tracy Ryerson	
2010–	The Real L Word	Showtime	Nikki Weiss	
2010–2012	RuPaul's Drag U	Logo	RuPaul	Each week three cisgender women are paired with drag "professors" to discover their inner drag queen. RuPaul is the "President" of Drag U. Lady Bunny is a judge and the "Dean of Drag".
2010–2012	RuPaul's Drag U	Logo	Lady Bunny	
2010–2012	RuPaul's Drag U	Logo	Nina Flowers (season 1)	
2010–2012	RuPaul's Drag U	Logo	Tammie Brown (season 1)	
2010–2012	RuPaul's Drag U	Logo	Ongina (seasons 1—2)	
2010–2012	RuPaul's Drag U	Logo	Shannel	
2010–2012	RuPaul's Drag U	Logo	Pandora Boxx	
2010–2012	RuPaul's Drag U	Logo	Jujubee	
2010–2012	RuPaul's Drag U	Logo	Raven	
2010–2012	RuPaul's Drag U	Logo	Morgan McMichaels	
2010–2012	RuPaul's Drag U	Logo	Tyra Sanchez (season 2)	
2010–2012	RuPaul's Drag U	Logo	BeBe Zahara Benet (season 1)	
2010–2012	RuPaul's Drag U	Logo	Carmen Carrera (season 3)	
2010–2012	RuPaul's Drag U	Logo	Mariah (season 2)	
2010–2012	RuPaul's Drag U	Logo	Latrice Royale	
2010–2012	RuPaul's Drag U	Logo	Chad Michaels	
2010–2012	RuPaul's Drag U	Logo	Raja	
2010–2012	RuPaul's Drag U	Logo	Alexis Mateo	
2010–2012	RuPaul's Drag U	Logo	Delta Work	
2010–2012	RuPaul's Drag U	Logo	Sharon Needles	
2010–2012	RuPaul's Drag U	Logo	Willam	
2010–2011	Work of Art: The Next Great Artist	Bravo	John Parot (season 1) and Young Sun (season 2)	
2010–2011	The A-List: New York	Logo	Reichen Lehmkuhl	Series follows the lives of gay men in New York City.
2010–2011	The A-List: New York	Logo	Rodiney Santiago	
2010–2011	The A-List: New York	Logo	Mike Ruiz	
2010–2011	The A-List: New York	Logo	Austin Armacost	
2010–2011	The A-List: New York	Logo	Derek Lloyd Saathoff	
2010–2011	The A-List: New York	Logo	Ryan Nickulas	
2010, 2012	Be Good Johnny Weir	Sundance (2010); Logo (2012)	Johnny Weir	
2010	On the Road with Austin & Santino	Lifetime	Santino Rice	Rice and fellow Project Runway alumnus Austin Scarlett travel to small towns in the United States performing makeovers on local women.
2010	High Society	The CW	Paul Johnson Calderon	Paul Johnson Calderon is a socialite in New York City.
2018–	Queer Eye	Netflix	Bobby Berk	Berk, Brown, France, Porowski, are gay.
2018–	Queer Eye	Netflix	Karamo Brown	Berk, Brown, France, Porowski, are gay.
2018–	Queer Eye	Netflix	Tan France	Berk, Brown, France, Porowski, are gay.
2018–	Queer Eye	Netflix	Antoni Porowski	Berk, Brown, France, Porowski, are gay.
2018–	Queer Eye	Netflix	Jonathan Van Ness	Van Ness is gay, gender non-conforming and non-binary.
2018–	Queer Eye	Netflix	AJ (Season 1)	AJ, a hero from season 1, is gay.
2018–	Queer Eye	Netflix	Skyler (Season 2)	Skyler, a hero from season 2, is a trans man.
2018–	Queer Eye	Netflix	Jess (Season 3)	Jess, a hero from season 3, is a lesbian.
2010–	RuPaul's Drag Race: Untucked!	Logo (2010–2014); VH1 (2018–)	RuPaul, contestants.	An accompanying series to RuPaul's Drag Race. Most contestants are gay men, with some being non-binary, trans women, etc.
2012–	RuPaul's Drag Race All Stars	Logo (2012–2016); VH1 (2016–)	RuPaul	RuPaul, Rice, Kressley, Hall, and Matthews are all gay men.
2012–	RuPaul's Drag Race All Stars	Logo (2012–2016); VH1 (2016–)	Santino Rice (Season 1)	RuPaul, Rice, Kressley, Hall, and Matthews are all gay men.
2012–	RuPaul's Drag Race All Stars	Logo (2012–2016); VH1 (2016–)	Carson Kressley (Season 2–)	RuPaul, Rice, Kressley, Hall, and Matthews are all gay men.
2012–	RuPaul's Drag Race All Stars	Logo (2012–2016); VH1 (2016–)	Todrick Hall (Season 2)	RuPaul, Rice, Kressley, Hall, and Matthews are all gay men.
2012–	RuPaul's Drag Race All Stars	Logo (2012–2016); VH1 (2016–)	Ross Mathews (Season 2–)	RuPaul, Rice, Kressley, Hall, and Matthews are all gay men.
2019–	RuPaul's Drag Race UK	BBC	RuPaul, Alan Carr and Graham Norton	RuPaul, Carr, and Norton are all gay men.
2018–	Drag Race Thailand	LINE TV	Judges, contestants	Various contestants are trans, gay, and non-binary.
2015–	The Switch Drag Race	Mega	Judges, contestants.	Various contestants are gay men and trans women.
2016	Big Brother Brasil 16	Globo	Matheus Lisboa	
2017–	The Great Canadian Baking Show	CBC Television	Dan Levy (Host) and Corey Shefman (Season 1)	Dan is gay, and Corey is stated to have a male partner.
2018	Big Brother Brasil 18	Globo	Mahmoud Baydoun	
2018	Dancing Queen	Netflix	Alyssa Edwards, Shangela Laquifa Wadley and Laganja Estranja	The series follows Edwards' life as a world famous drag queen and owner and artistic director of Beyond Belief Dance Company.
2018–	House of Drag	TVNZ OnDemand; OutTV	Kita Mean and Anita Wigl'it	Judges and contestants are gay men and trans people.
2019	Big Brother Brasil 19	Globo	Gabriela Hebling	
2019	Big Brother Brasil 19	Globo	Rodrigo França	
2019–	Queen of Drags	ProSieban	Bill Kaulitz (Judge) and Conchita Wurst (Judge)	
2018–	Drag Heals	OutTV	Contestants	Series follows aspiring drag kings and queens in a "drag school" program.

== 2020s ==
Year	Title	Network	Cast member	Notes
2020	Big Brother Brasil 20	Globo	Bianca Andrade	
2020	Big Brother Brasil 20	Globo	Daniel Lenhardt	
2020	Big Brother Brasil 20	Globo	Marcela McGowan	
2020	Big Brother Brasil 20	Globo	Victor Hugo Teixeira	
2020–	RuPaul's Secret Celebrity Drag Race	VH1	RuPaul (Host)	RuPaul, Kressley, Matthews, and the Drag Mentors are gay men.
2020–	RuPaul's Secret Celebrity Drag Race	VH1	Carson Kressley (Judge)	
2020–	RuPaul's Secret Celebrity Drag Race	VH1	Ross Matthews (Judge)	
2020–	RuPaul's Secret Celebrity Drag Race	VH1	Nico Tortorella (Contestant)	Tortorella is non-binary.
2020–	RuPaul's Secret Celebrity Drag Race	VH1	Monét X Change	
2020–	RuPaul's Secret Celebrity Drag Race	VH1	Bob the Drag Queen	
2020–	RuPaul's Secret Celebrity Drag Race	VH1	Trixie Mattel	
2020–	RuPaul's Secret Celebrity Drag Race	VH1	Asia O'Hara	
2020–	RuPaul's Secret Celebrity Drag Race	VH1	Trinity the Tuck	
2020–	RuPaul's Secret Celebrity Drag Race	VH1	Alyssa Edwards	
2020–	RuPaul's Secret Celebrity Drag Race	VH1	Nina West (Drag Mentor)	
2020–	RuPaul's Secret Celebrity Drag Race	VH1	Kim Chi (Drag Mentor)	
2020–	Dragnificent!	TLC	Alexis Michelle	Michelle, Benet, Jujubee, and Thor are all gay men. Originally started as the 2019 TV special Drag Me Down the Aisle. Started as full television series in April 2020.
2020–	Dragnificent!	TLC	BeBe Zahara Benet	Michelle, Benet, Jujubee, and Thor are all gay men. Originally started as the 2019 TV special Drag Me Down the Aisle. Started as full television series in April 2020.
2020–	Dragnificent!	TLC	Jujubee	Michelle, Benet, Jujubee, and Thor are all gay men. Originally started as the 2019 TV special Drag Me Down the Aisle. Started as full television series in April 2020.
2020–	Dragnificent!	TLC	Thorgy Thor	Michelle, Benet, Jujubee, and Thor are all gay men. Originally started as the 2019 TV special Drag Me Down the Aisle. Started as full television series in April 2020.
2020-	Princess Charming	RTL	Contestants	German reality dating show with women-identifying and non-binary queer contestants based on The Bachelorette and Prince Charming.
2021	Big Brother Brasil 21	Globo	Gil do Vigor	
2021	Big Brother Brasil 21	Globo	João Luiz Pedrosa	
2021	Big Brother Brasil 21	Globo	Karol Conká	
2021	Big Brother Brasil 21	Globo	Lucas Penteado	
2021	Big Brother Brasil 21	Globo	Lumena Aleluia	
2021	Big Brother Brasil 21	Globo	Pocah	
2022	Bad Hair Day	TLC	Ryan Wesley (Self)	Ryan Wesley is the Hair Center Director for Bad Hair Day which changes the lives of those with severe hair medical conditions.
2022	Big Brother Brasil 22	Globo	Brunna Gonçalves	
2022	Big Brother Brasil 22	Globo	Linn da Quebrada	
2022	Big Brother Brasil 22	Globo	Luciano Estevan	
2022	Big Brother Brasil 22	Globo	Maria Bomani	
2022	Big Brother Brasil 22	Globo	Tiago Abravanel	
2022	Big Brother Brasil 22	Globo	Vinicius de Souza	
2023	Big Brother Brasil 23	Globo	Aline Wirley	
2023	Big Brother Brasil 23	Globo	Bruno Nogueira	
2023	Big Brother Brasil 23	Globo	Fred Nicácio	
2023	Big Brother Brasil 23	Globo	Gabriel Santana	
2023	Big Brother Brasil 23	Globo	Manoel Vicente	
2023	Big Brother Brasil 23	Globo	Sarah Aline Rodrigues	
2023	Charming Boys	RTL	Contestants	A German dating show that originated as a spin off of the format Prince Charming. Old participants from the four seasons meet new contestants to leave the villa as the winning couple at the end.
2023	Amazing Race Suomi	Nelonen	Ilmari Nurminen and Aapo Heitula; Silvia Modig	
2024	Big Brother Brasil 24	Globo	Marcus Vinicius Brito Ferreira	
2024	Big Brother Brasil 24	Globo	Michel Nogueira	
2025	Big Brother Brasil 25	Globo	Diego Hypólito	
2025	Big Brother Brasil 25	Globo	Mateus Pires	
2025	Big Brother Brasil 25	Globo	Vitória Strada	
2026	Big Brother Brasil 26	Globo	Breno Corã	
2026	Big Brother Brasil 26	Globo	Marcelo Alves	

== See also ==
- List of comedy and variety television programs with LGBT cast members
- List of LGBT characters in television and radio
- List of animated series with LGBTQ+ characters
- List of dramatic television series with LGBT characters: 1970s–2000s
- List of dramatic television series with LGBT characters: 2010s
- List of dramatic television series with LGBT characters: 2020s
- List of made-for-television films with LGBT characters
- List of LGBT characters in soap operas
- List of news and information television programs featuring LGBT subjects
