= List of Big Brother Brasil housemates =

Big Brother Brasil is a Brazilian television show in which contestants (also called housemates) compete against each other to be the last Big Brother house resident and win the grand prize. The series first aired in 2002, and 25 seasons have been filmed as of April 2025.

Big Brother contestants are chosen by the show's producers through an application process that includes a videotape submission, semi-final interviews at select cities, and a final interview in Rio de Janeiro.

A total of 422 participants have competed, and 9 of them have competed in two seasons; in 2010, Joseane Oliveira (13th in season 3) and Marcelo Dourado (7th in season 4) returned to compete in season 10. Joseane placed 17th and Dourado won the game; in 2013, Kleber Bambam (1st in season 1), Dhomini Ferreira (1st in season 3), Fani Pacheco (7th in season 7) Natalia Casassola (3rd in season 8), Elieser Ambrosio and Anamara Barreira (9th and 6th in season 10) returned to compete in season 13. Bambam walked at the end of week 1 and was replaced by Yuri Fernandes (7th in season 12). Dhomini placed 15th, Yuri placed 13th, Elieser placed 10th, Anamara placed 8th, Fani placed 6th and Natalia placed 4th.

The youngest housemates were Elane Silva (season 3) and Juliana Brandão (season 5), who entered the house at age 18. The oldest housemate was Ieda Wobeto from (season 17), who entered the house at age 70.

== Contestants ==
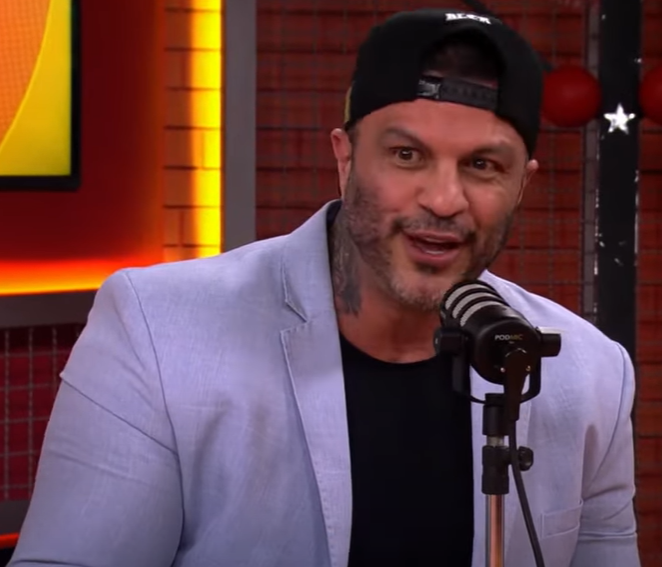
Kleber Bambam, Seasons 1 and 13.

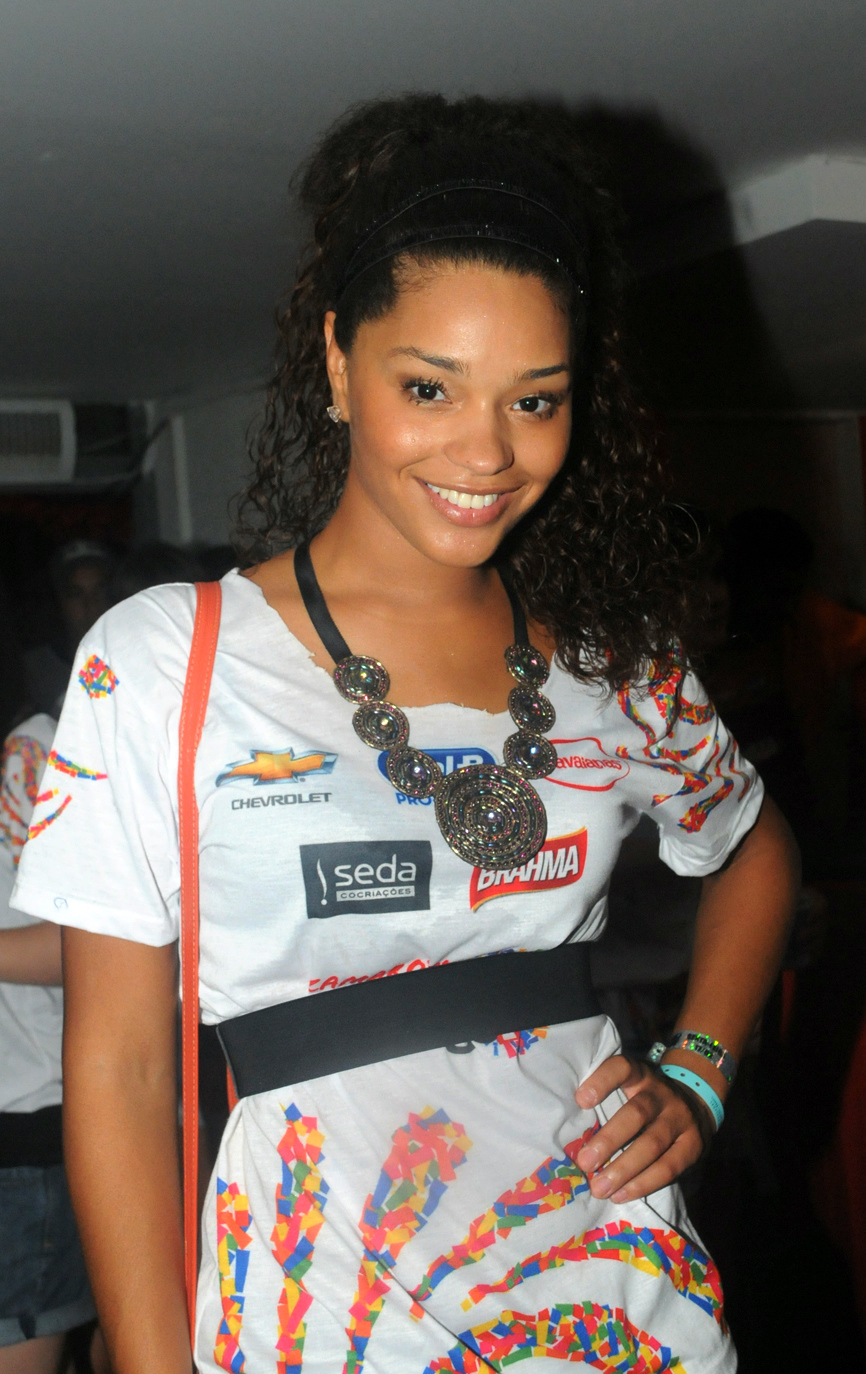
Juliana Alves, Season 3.

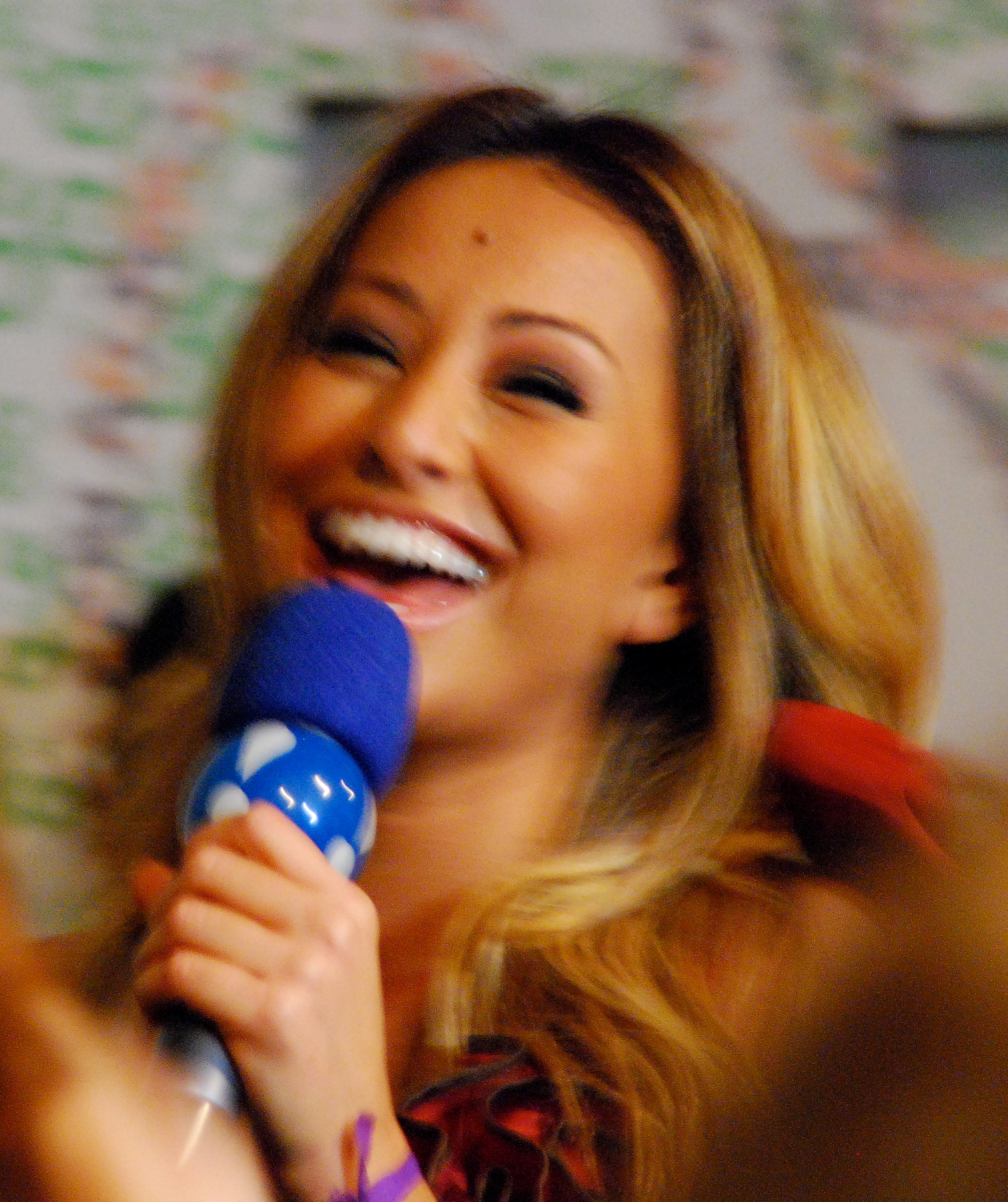
Sabrina Sato, Season 3.

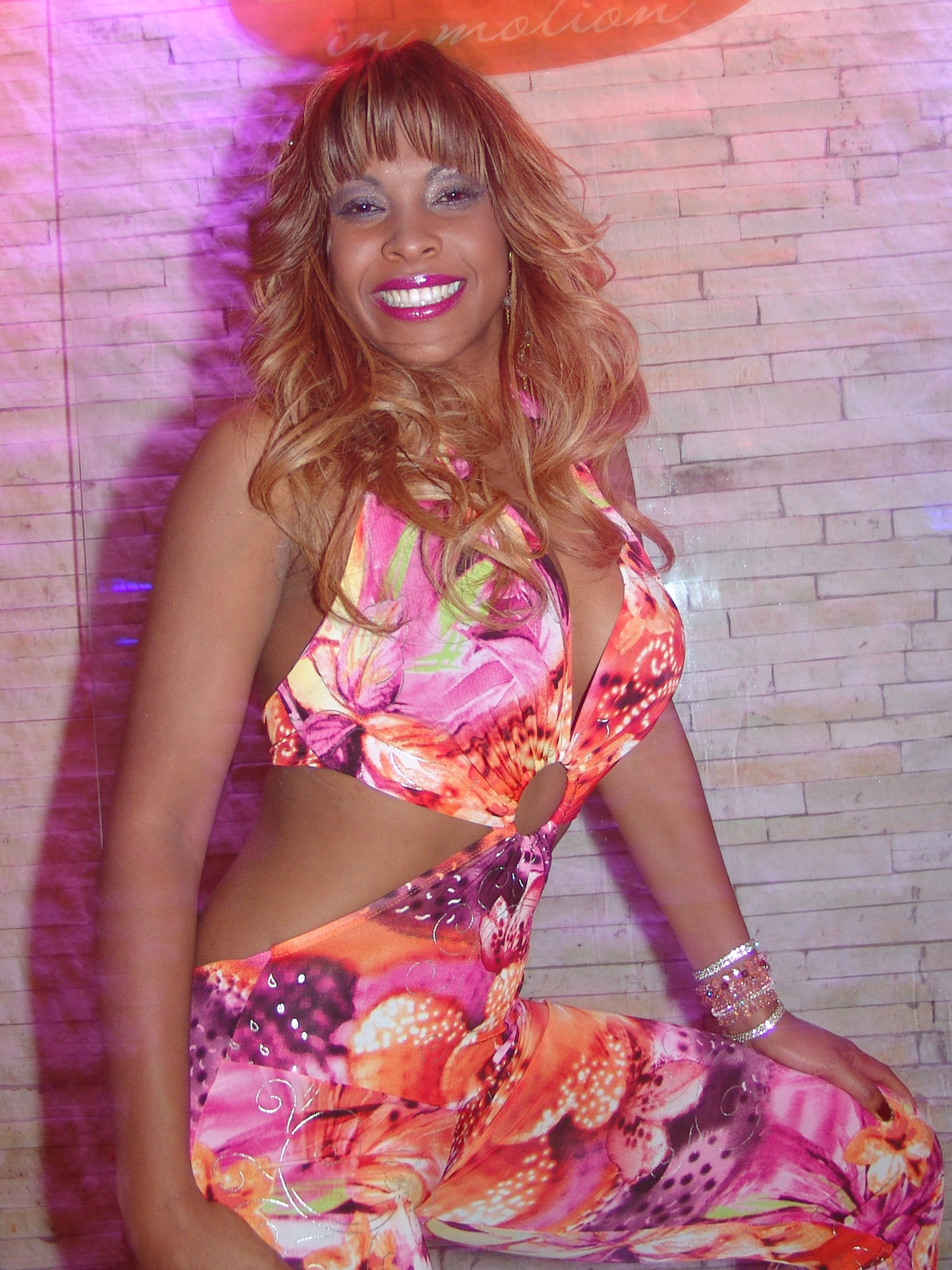
Solange Maria, Season 4.

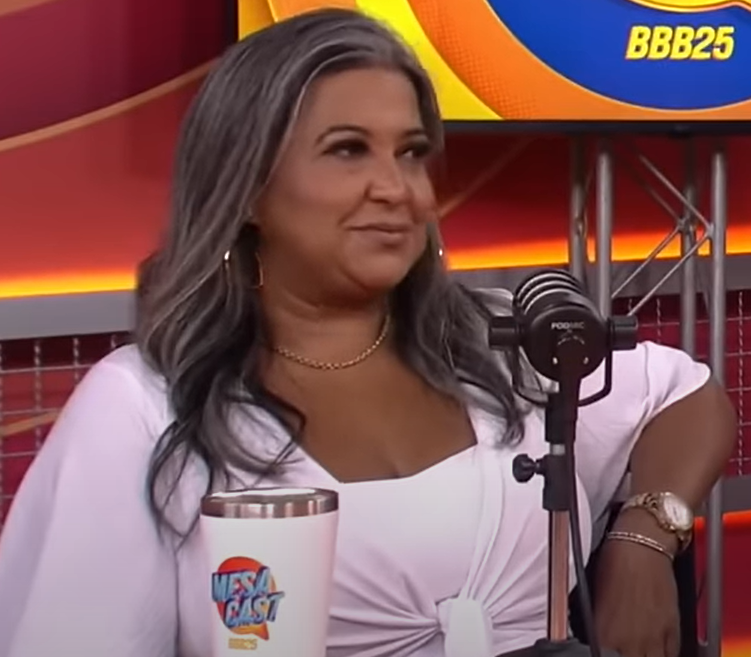
Cida dos Santos, Season 4.

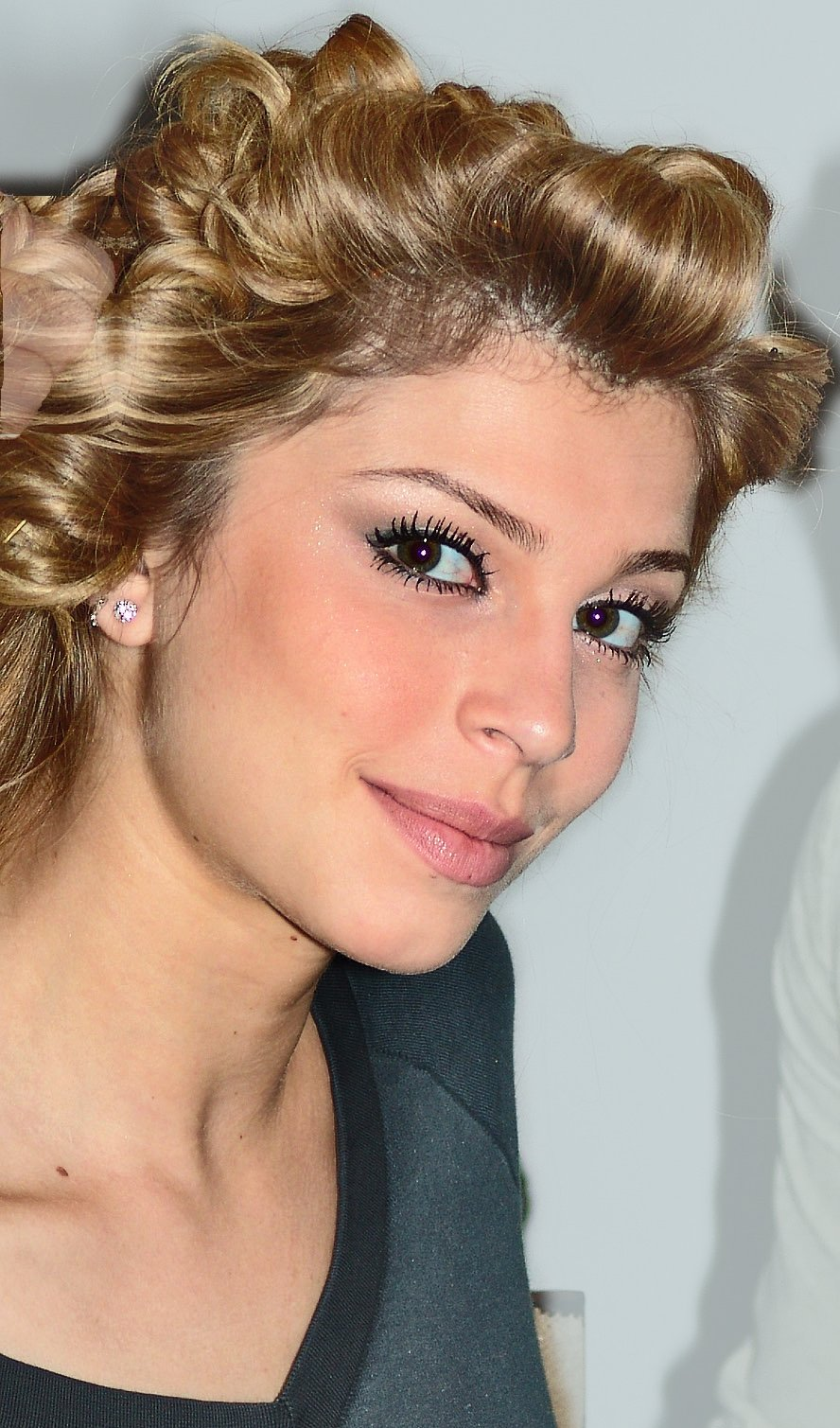
Grazielli Massafera, Season 5.

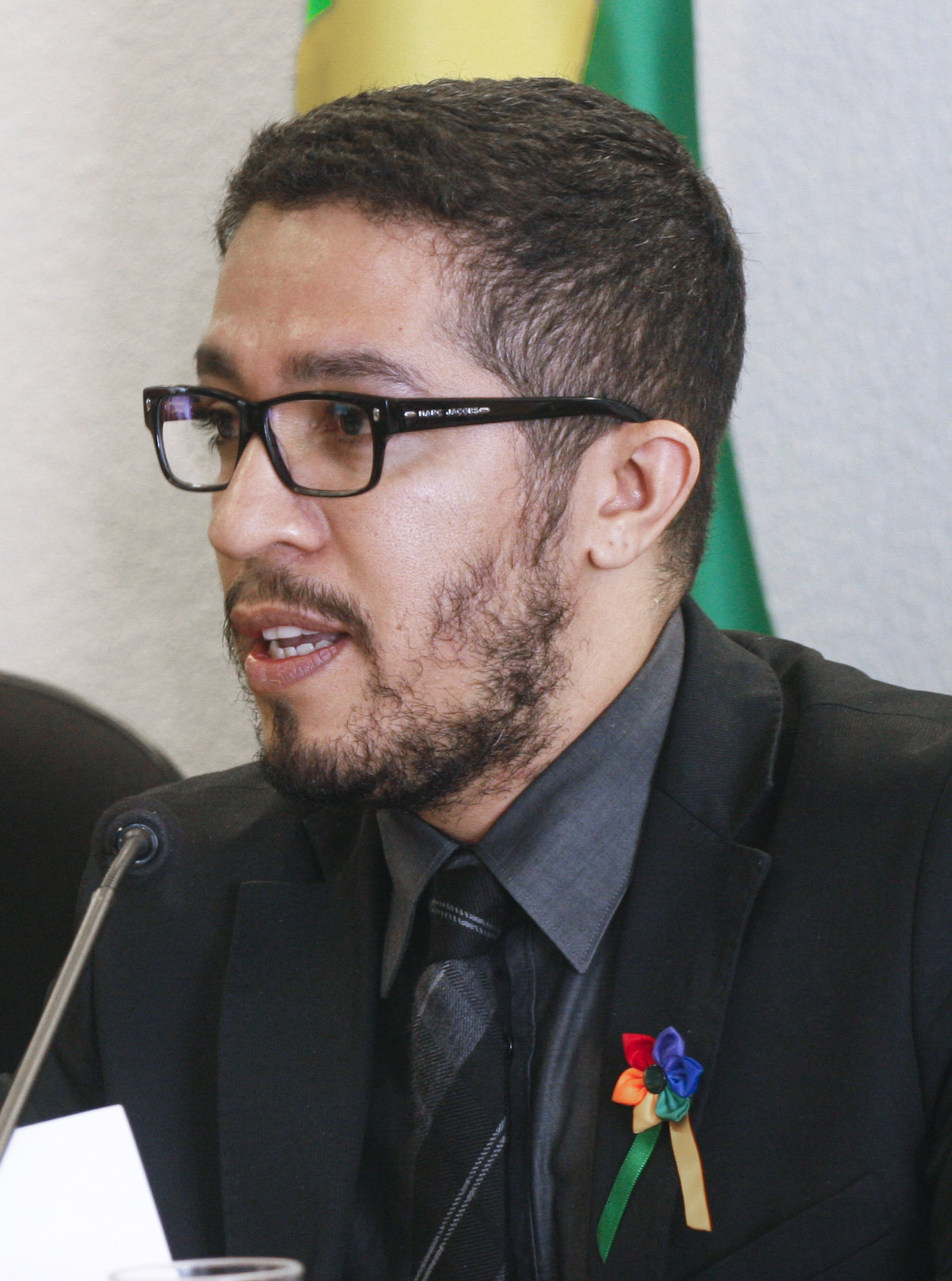
Jean Wyllys, Season 5.

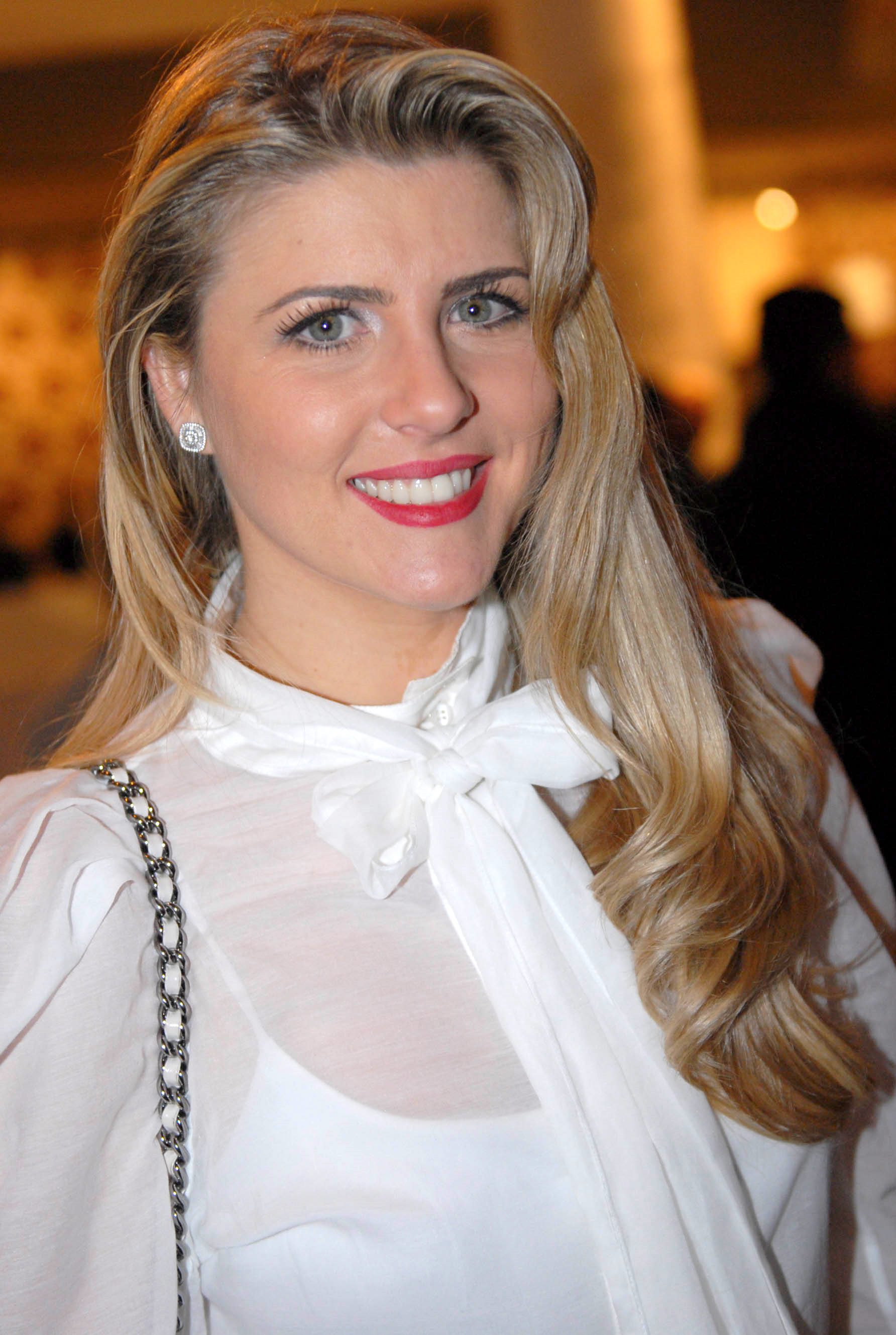
Íris Stefanelli, Season 7.

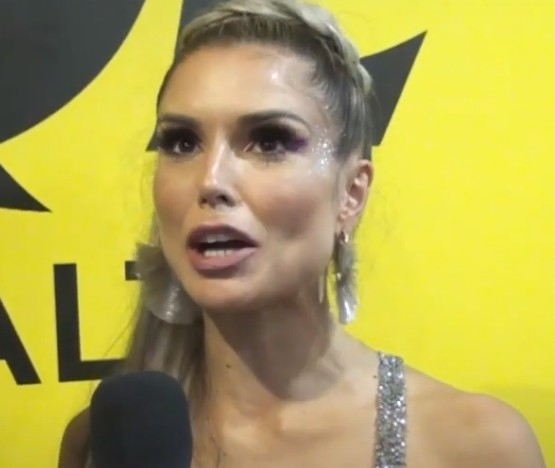
Flávia Viana, Season 7.

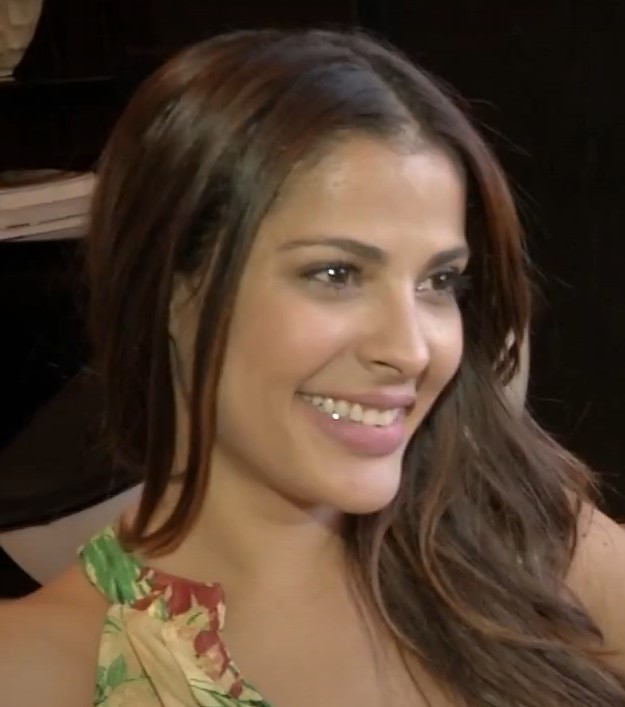
Gyselle Soares, Season 8.

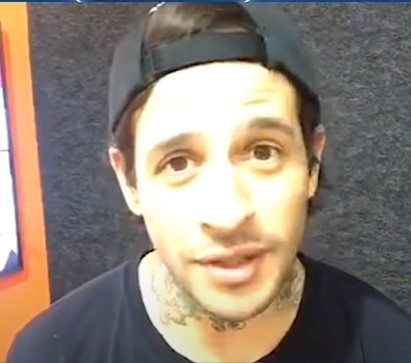
Rafinha Ribeiro, Season 8.

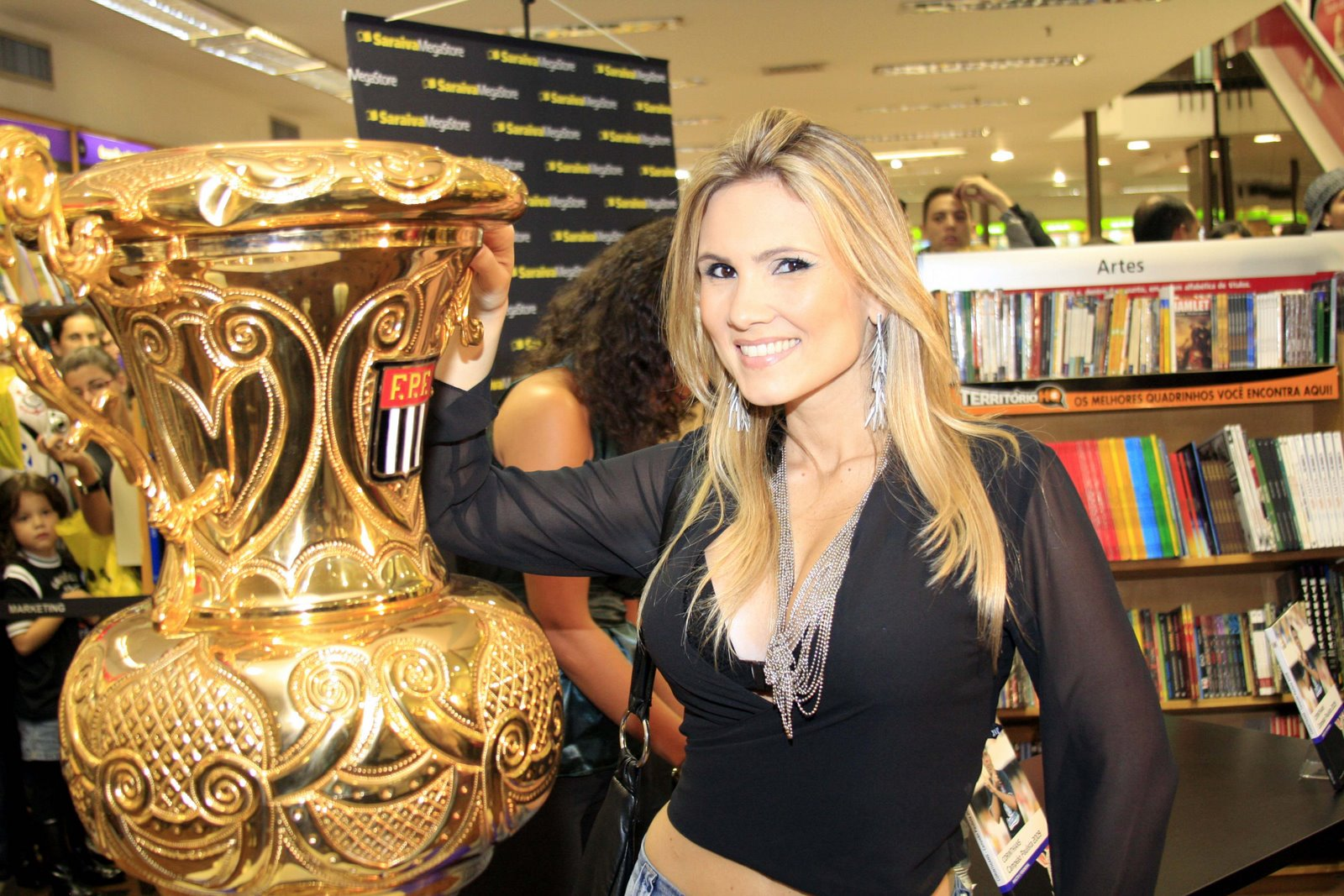
Josiane Oliveira, Season 9.

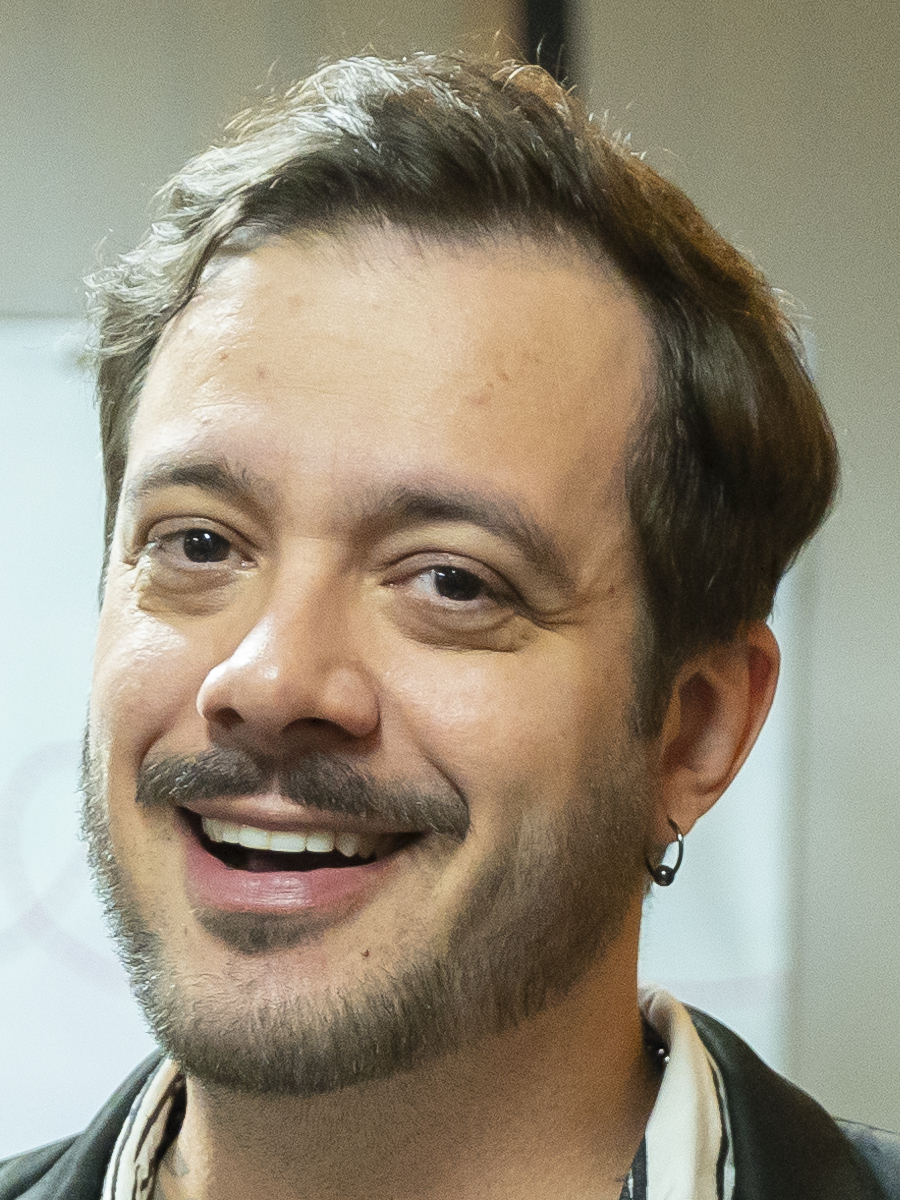
Maximiliano Porto, Season 9.

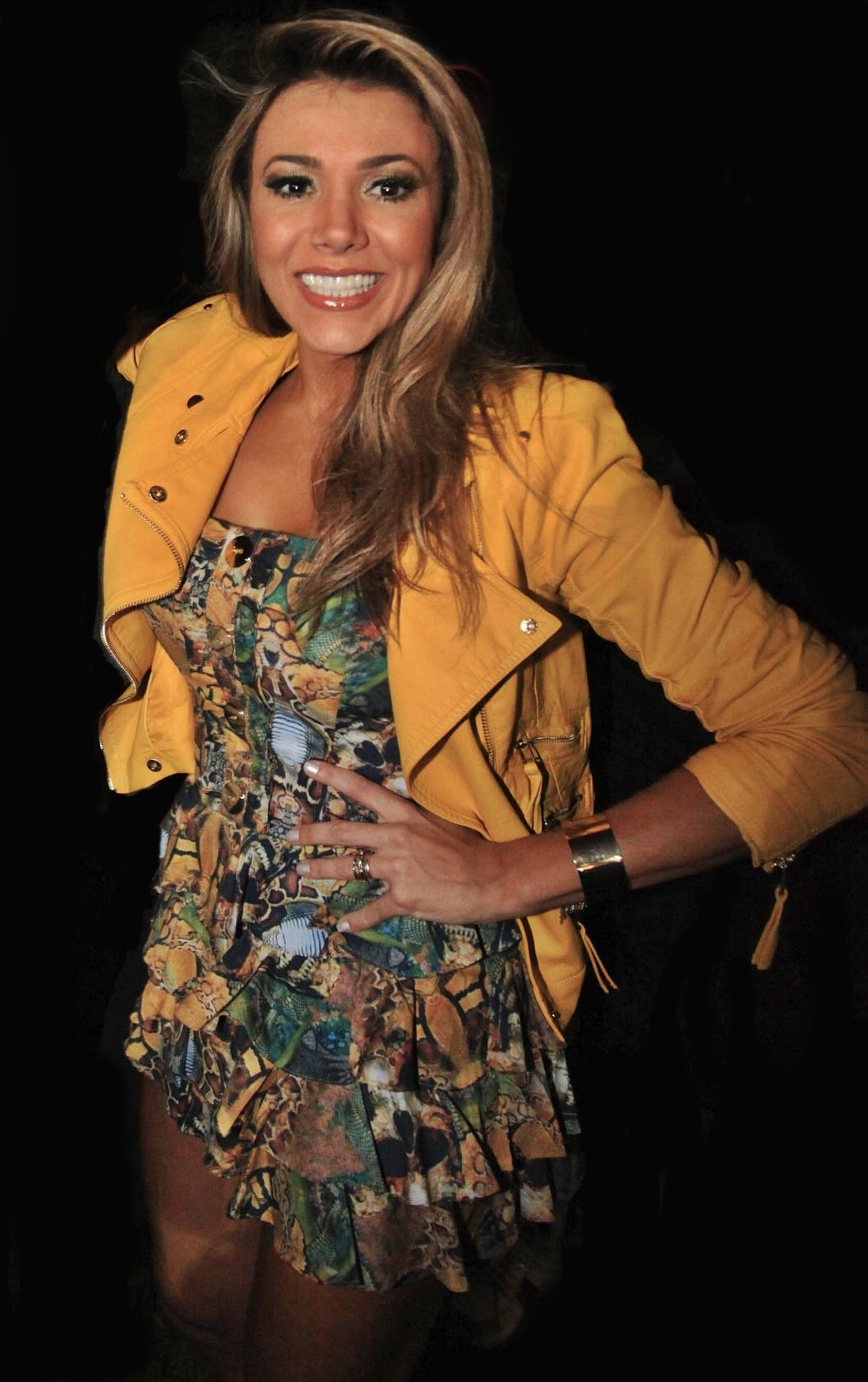
Fabiana Teixeira, Season 12.

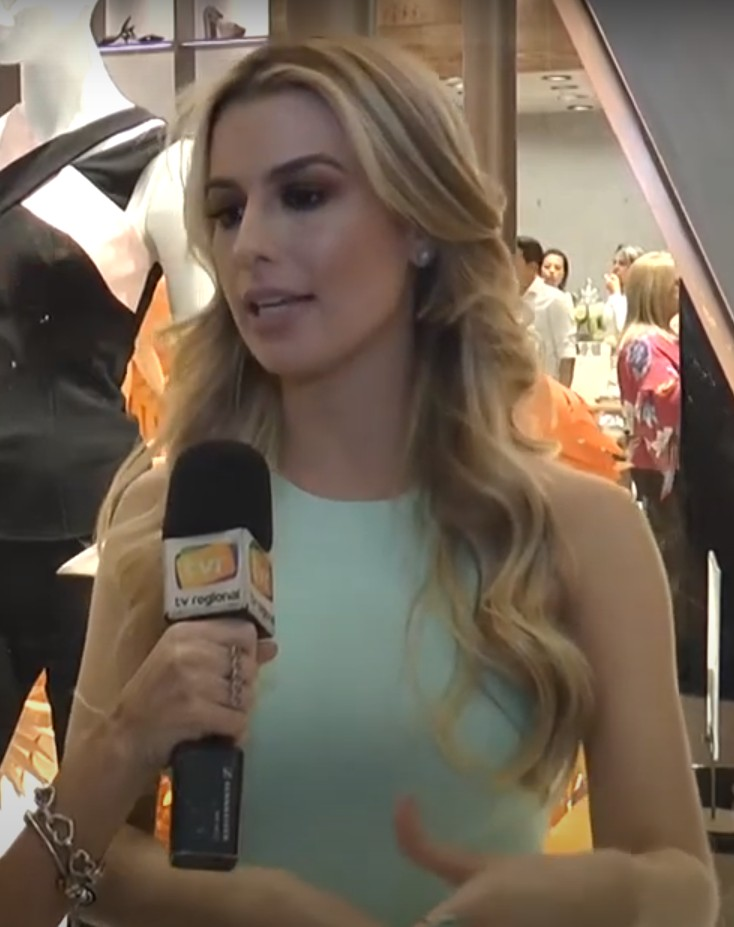
Fernanda Keulla, Season 13.

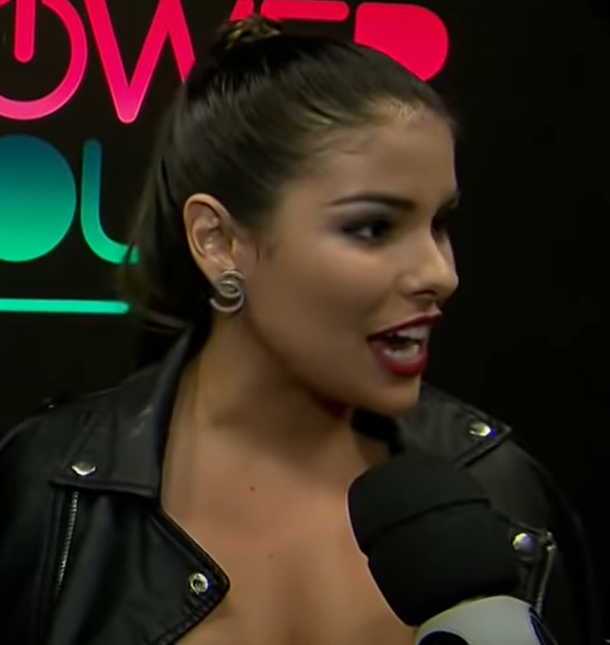
Munik Nunes, Season 16.

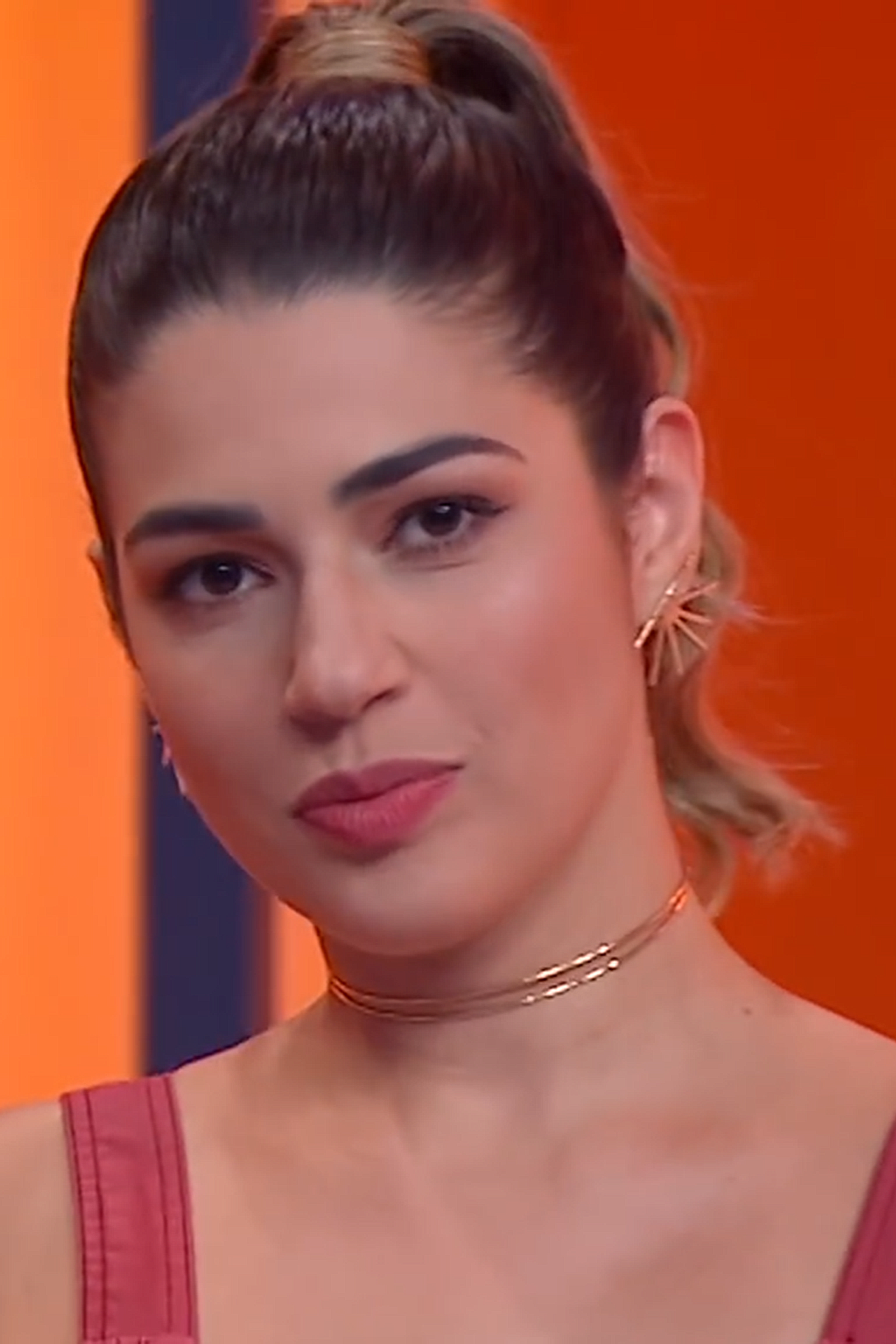
Vivian Amorim, Season 17.

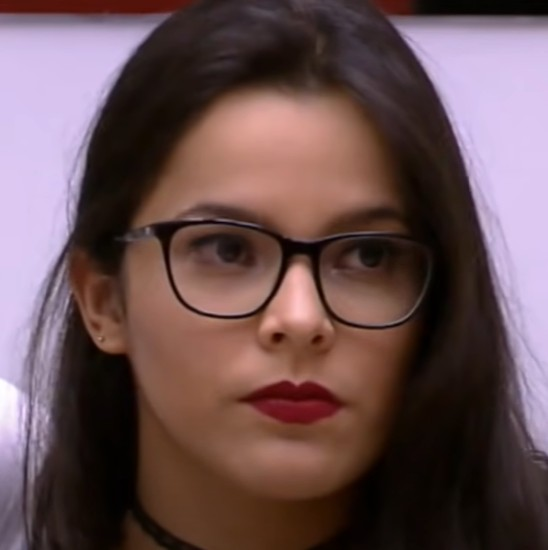
Emilly Araújo, Season 17.

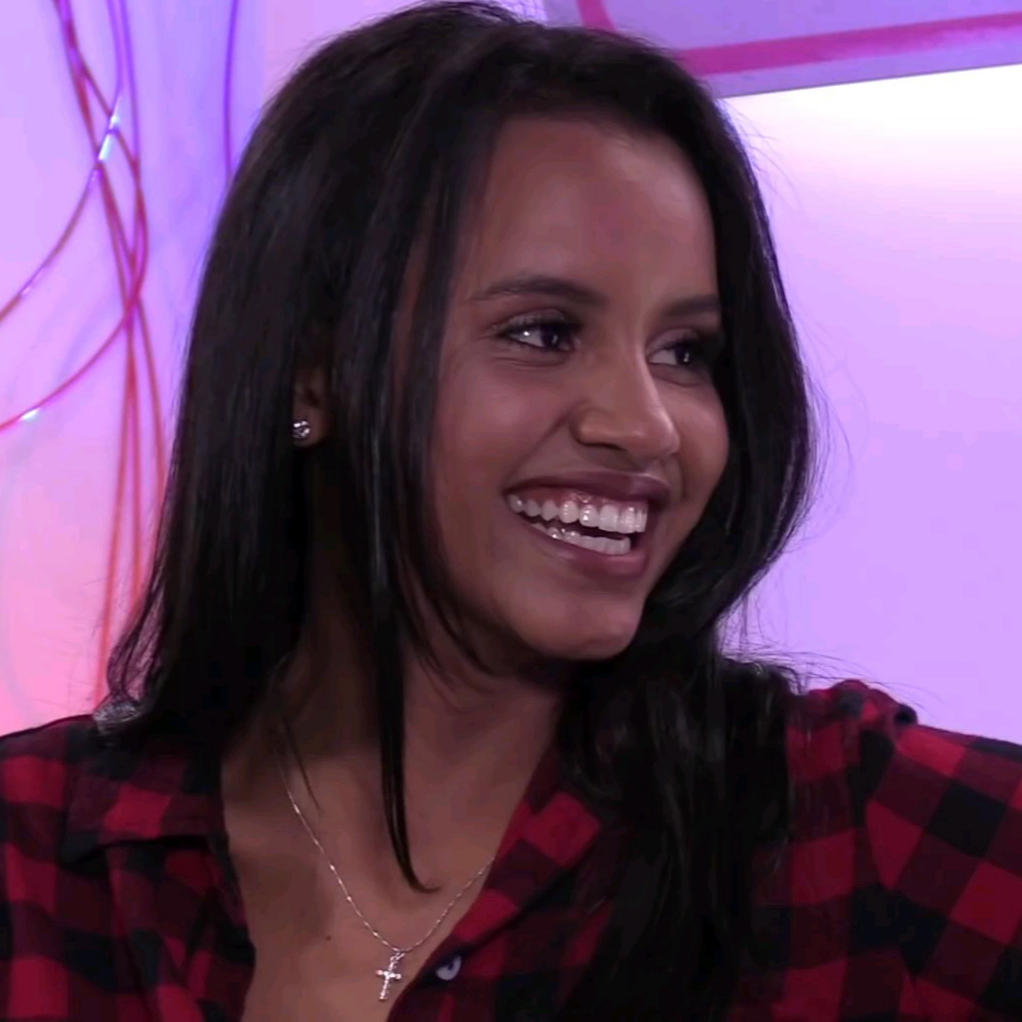
Gleici Damasceno, Season 18.

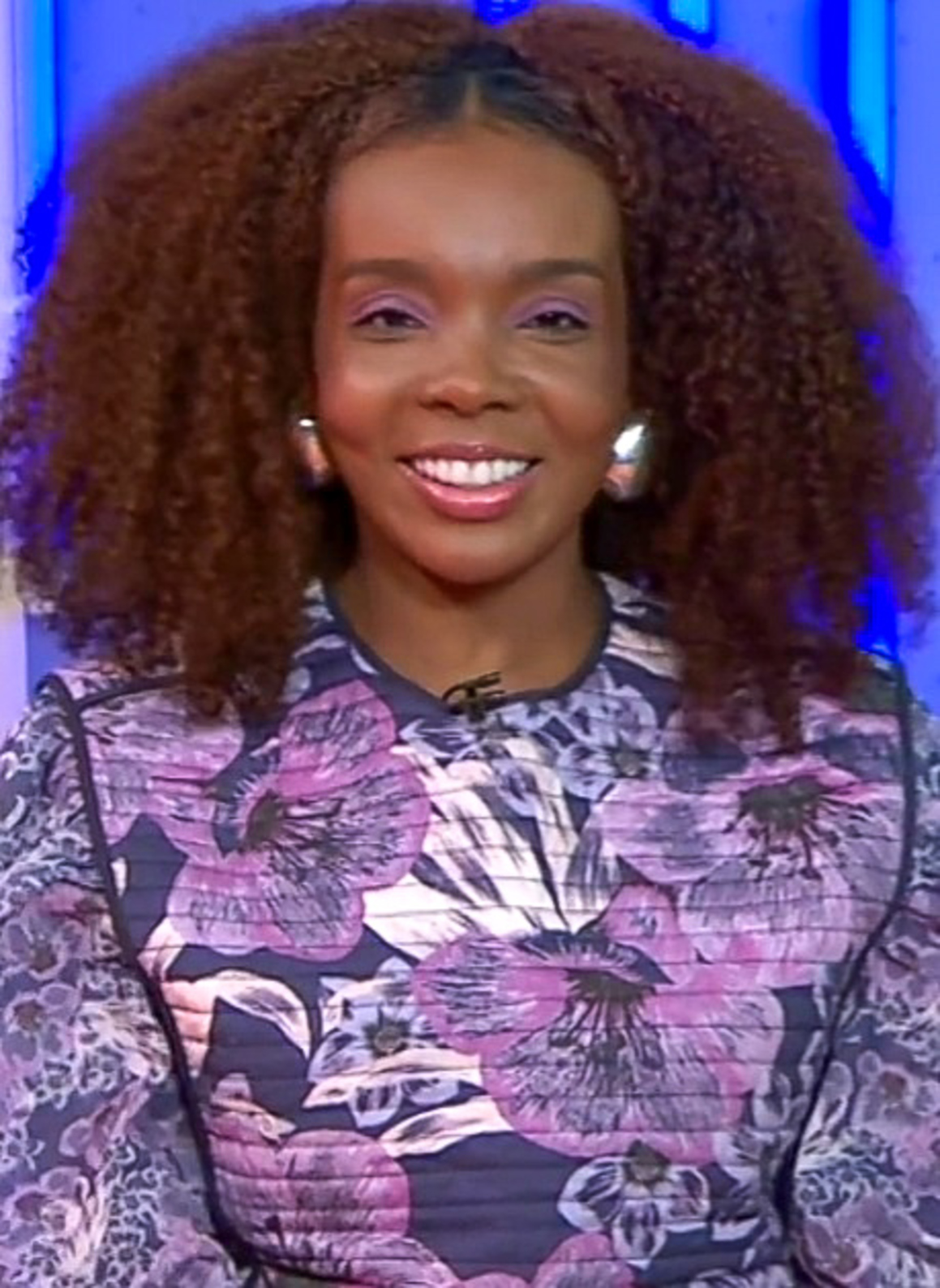
Thelma Assis, Season 20.

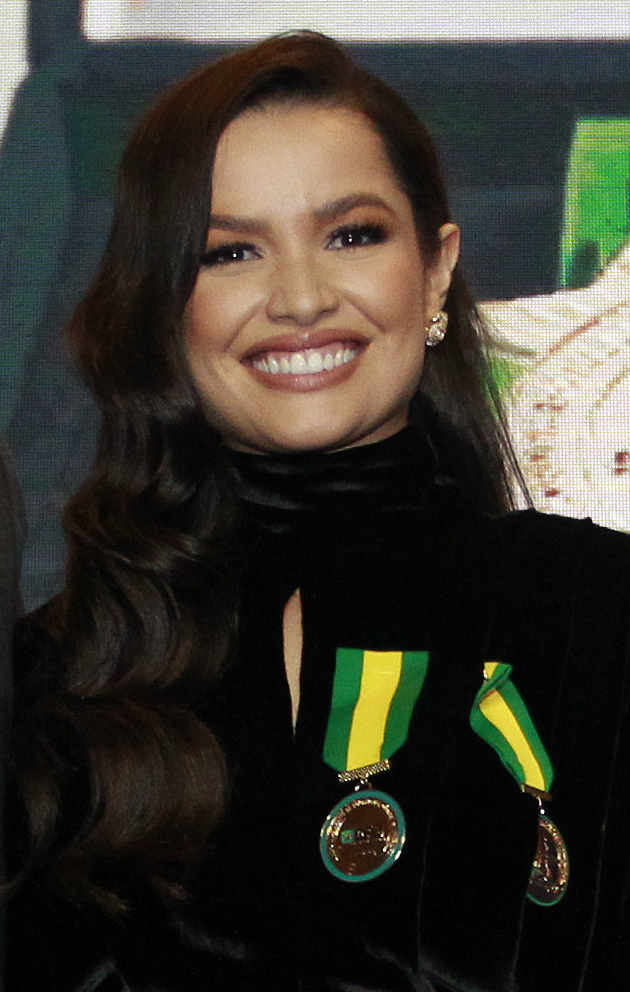
Juliette Freire, Season 21.

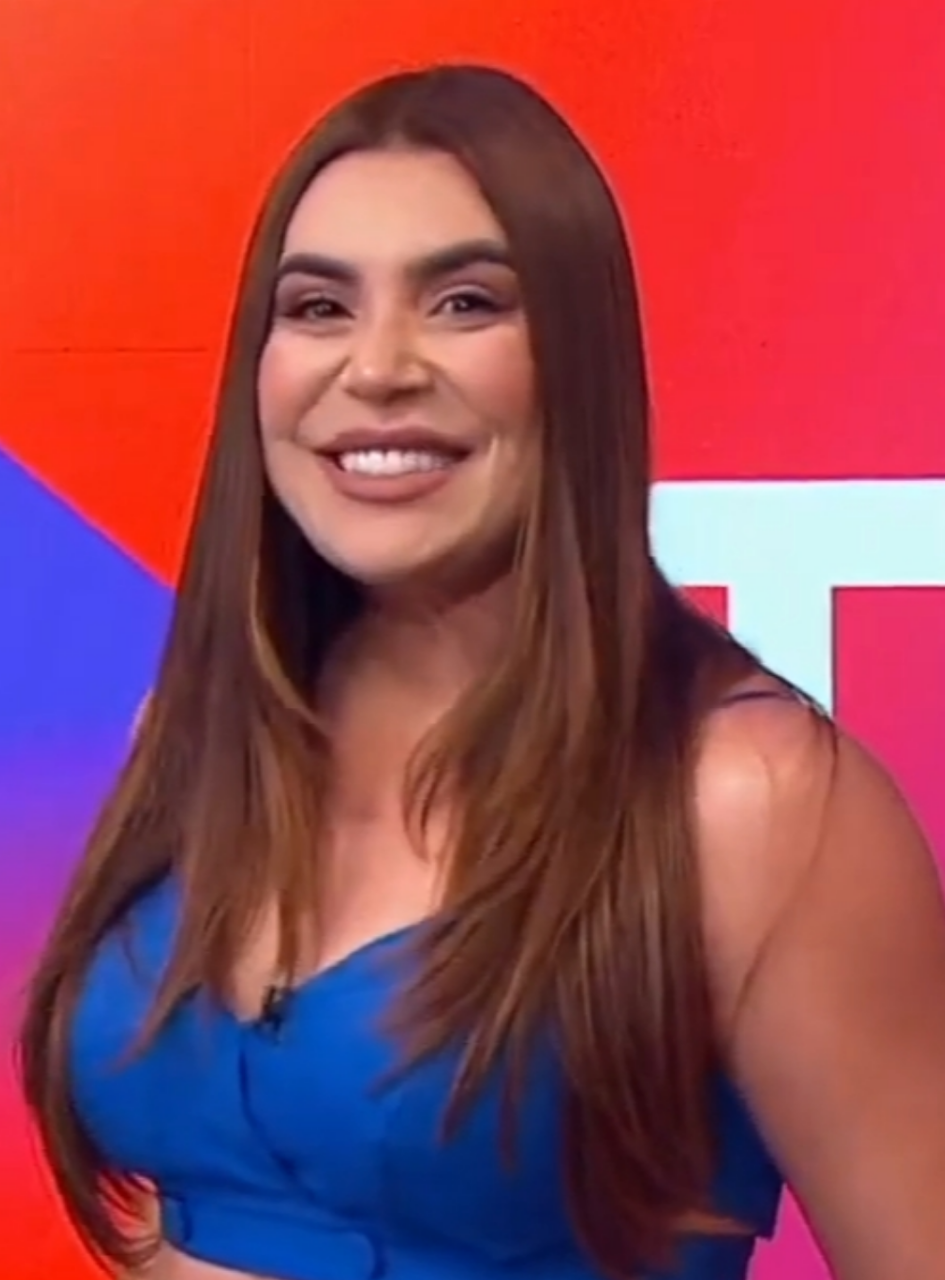
Naiara Azevedo, Season 22.

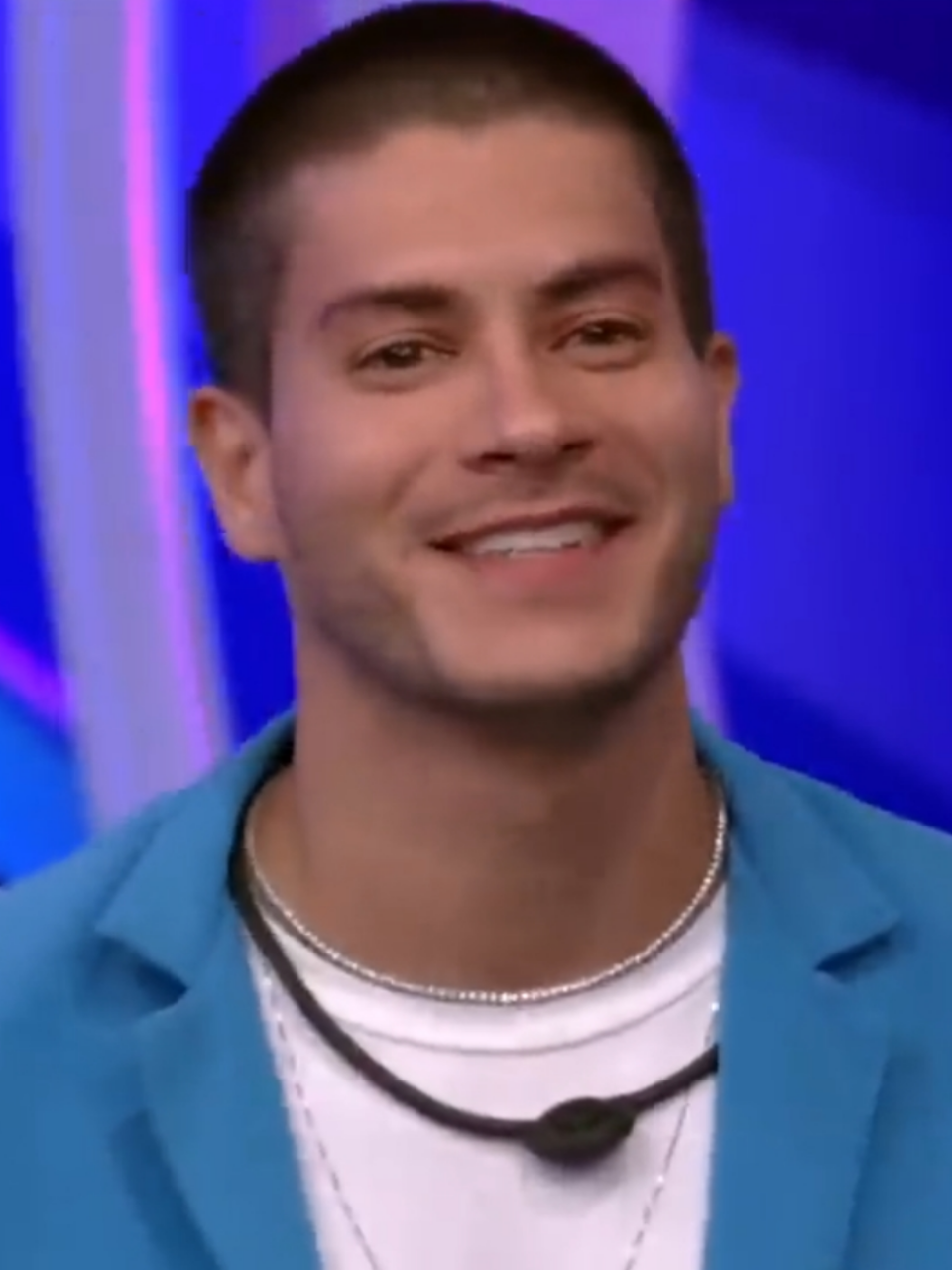
Arthur Aguiar, Season 22.

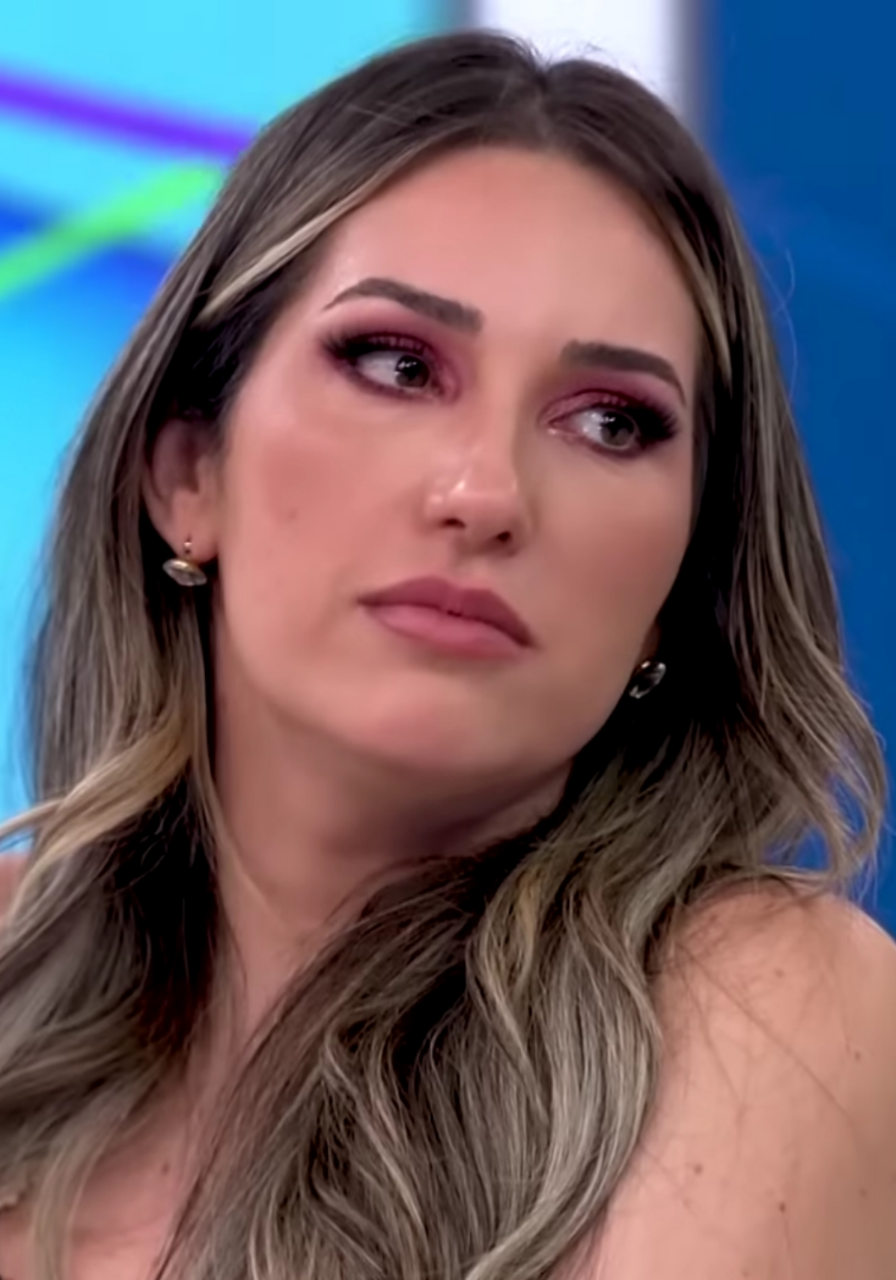
Amanda Meirelles, Season 23.

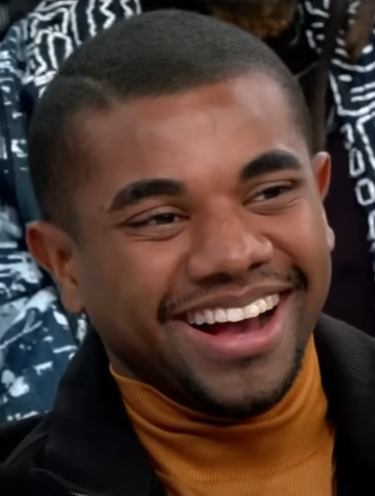
Davi Brito, Season 24.

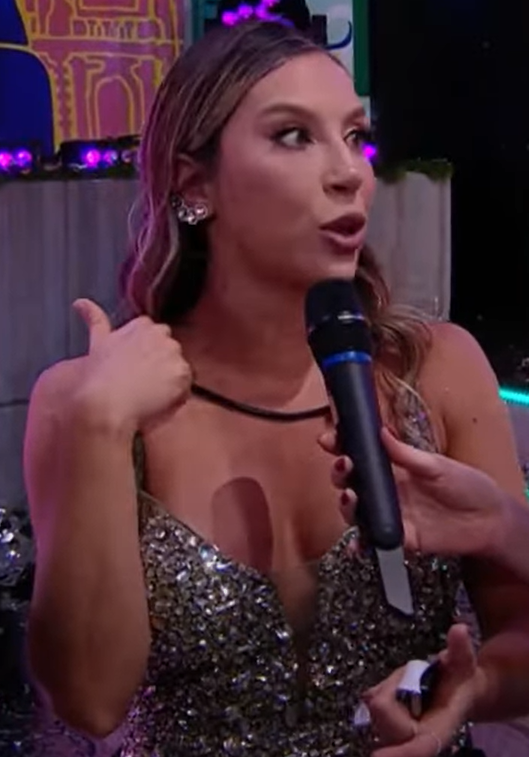
Renata Saldanha, Season 25.

Contestant played the game for a second time.

#	Name	Age^{1}	Occupation	Hometown	Status	Finish
1	Caetano Zonaro	39	Model	São Paulo	Evicted: Day 08	12th
1	Xaiane Dantas	27	Barwoman	Rio de Janeiro	Evicted: Day 15	11th
1	Bruno Saladini	28	Model	Rio de Janeiro	Evicted: Day 22	10th
1	Cristiana Mota	28	Singer	Rio de Janeiro	Evicted: Day 29	9th
1	Helena Louro	25	Actress	Maringá	Evicted: Day 36	8th
1	Adriano de Castro	34	Artist	Salvador	Evicted: Day 43	7th
1	Estela Padilha	24	Videographer	São Paulo	Evicted: Day 50	6th
1	Alessandra Begliomini	28	Businesswoman	Rio de Janeiro	Evicted: Day 57	5th
1	Sérgio Tavares	30	Hairdresser	Angola	Evicted: Day 62	4th
1	André Gabeh	28	Singing teacher	Rio de Janeiro	Finalist: Day 64	3rd
1	Vanessa Pascale	28	Model	Rio de Janeiro	Finalist: Day 64	Runner-Up
1	Kleber Bambam	24	Dancer	Campinas	Finalist: Day 64	Winner
2	Rita Sinara	30	Fortune-teller	Rio de Janeiro	Evicted: Day 08	12th
2	Tina Soares	22	Football player	São Paulo	Evicted: Day 15	11th
2	Fernando Fernandes	21	Boxer	São Paulo	Evicted: Day 22	10th
2	Jeferson Santos	28	Singer	Carapicuíba	Evicted: Day 29	9th
2	Moisés da Silva	26	Salesman	Porto de Galinhas	Evicted: Day 36	8th
2	Thais Ventura	19	Student	Niterói	Evicted: Day 43	7th
2	Fabricio Amaral	25	Student	Novo Hamburgo	Evicted: Day 50	6th
2	Tarciana Mafra	27	Saleswoman	Recife	Evicted: Day 57	5th
2	Thyrso Mattos	26	Chef	São Paulo	Evicted: Day 64	4th
2	Cida Moraes	39	Flight attendant	Rio de Janeiro	Evicted: Day 69	3rd
2	Manuela Saadeh	23	Student	Rio de Janeiro	Finalist: Day 71	Runner-Up
2	Rodrigo Leonel	32	Cowboy	Ribeirão Preto	Finalist: Day 71	Winner
3	Samantha Pereira	28	Personal trainer	Rio de Janeiro	Evicted: Day 08	14th–15th
3	Paulo Carotini	33	Photographer	São Paulo	Evicted: Day 08	14th–15th
3	Dilson Walkarez	30	Biker	Campo Grande	Walked: Day 12	13th
3	Joseane Oliveira	22	Model	Canoas	Evicted: Day 15	12th
3	Marcelo Kretzer	22	Disc jockey	Blumenau	Evicted: Day 22	11th
3	Andréa Guerrero	39	Advertiser	São Paulo	Evicted: Day 29	10th
3	Juliana Alves	21	Student	Rio de Janeiro	Evicted: Day 36	9th
3	Alan Cavalcante	26	Basketball player	Rio de Janeiro	Evicted: Day 43	8th
3	Emilio Zagaia	30	Diver	Londrina	Evicted: Day 50	7th
3	Sabrina Sato	22	Student	Penápolis	Evicted: Day 57	6th
3	Harry Grossman	34	Guidebook	Teresópolis	Evicted: Day 64	5th
3	Jean Massumi Hara	28	Massage therapist	São Paulo	Evicted: Day 71	4th
3	Viviane Oliveira	28	Lawyer	Votorantim	Evicted: Day 76	3rd
3	Elane Silva	18	Teacher	Itanhém	Finalist: Day 78	Runner-Up
3	Dhomini Ferreira	31	Congressional aide	Goiânia	Finalist: Day 78	Winner
4	Tatiana Giordano	21	Student	São Paulo	Evicted: Day 08	14th
4	Eduardo Coelho	24	Advertiser	Belo Horizonte	Evicted: Day 15	13th
4	Cristiano Carnevale	29	Shopkeeper	Rio de Janeiro	Evicted: Day 22	12th
4	Antonela Avellaneda	21	Student	Buenos Aires, Argentina	Evicted: Day 29	11th
4	Géris Leite	30	Nurse	Cajazeiras	Evicted: Day 36	10th
4	Edilson Buba	32	Businessman	Curitiba	Evicted: Day 43	9th
4	Zulu Gomes	23	Fighter	Niterói	Evicted: Day 50	8th
4	Marcelo Dourado	31	P.E. teacher	Porto Alegre	Evicted: Day 57	7th
4	Rogério Dragone	25	Gravedigger	São Paulo	Evicted: Day 64	6th
4	Marcela Queiroz	25	Promoter	Londrina	Evicted: Day 71	5th
4	Solange Maria	25	Attendant	Mogi Guaçu	Evicted: Day 78	4th
4	Juliana Lopes	23	Promoter	Brasília	Evicted: Day 83	3rd
4	Thiago Lira	23	Assistant auditor	Rio de Janeiro	Finalist: Day 85	Runner-Up
4	Cida dos Santos	21	Nanny	Mangaratiba	Finalist: Day 85	Winner
5	Juliana Brandão	18	Student	Prado	Evicted: Day 09	15th
5	Marielza Santos	47	Housewife	Rio de Janeiro	Withdrew: Day 13	14th
5	Marcos Maçaneiro	25	Baker	Palhoça	Evicted: Day 16	13th
5	Giulliano Ciarelli	26	Football player	Campinas	Evicted: Day 23	12th
5	Rogerio Padovan	27	Doctor	Ribeirão Preto	Evicted: Day 30	11th
5	Paulo André Costa	28	Consultant	Guarulhos	Evicted: Day 37	10th
5	Natalia Nara	22	TV presenter	Fortaleza	Evicted: Day 44	9th
5	Tatiana Machado	27	Promoter	Rio de Janeiro	Evicted: Day 51	8th
5	Aline Cristina	18	Housewife	Rio de Janeiro	Evicted: Day 58	7th
5	Karla Pereira	21	Dancer	Recife	Evicted: Day 65	6th
5	Tatiane Pink Franklin	24	Hairdresser	Recife	Evicted: Day 72	5th
5	Alan Santos	25	Engineer	Belo Horizonte	Evicted: Day 77	4th
5	Sammy Ueda	26	Salesman	Indaiatuba	Finalist: Day 79	3rd
5	Grazielli Massafera	22	Model	Jacarezinho	Finalist: Day 79	Runner-Up
5	Jean Wyllys	30	College teacher	Alagoinhas	Finalist: Day 79	Winner
6	Juliana Canabarro	22	Promoter	Porto Alegre	Evicted: Day 08	14th
6	Dan Costa	24	Assistant coach	São Paulo	Evicted: Day 15	13th
6	Daniel Saullo	25	Model	Belo Horizonte	Evicted: Day 22	12th
6	Roberta Brasil	22	Dancer	Fortaleza	Evicted: Day 29	11th
6	Léa Ferreira	23	Motogirl	São Paulo	Evicted: Day 36	10th
6	Thais Macêdo	27	Psychologist	Belém	Evicted: Day 43	9th
6	Inês Gomes	21	Student	Rio de Janeiro	Evicted: Day 50	8th
6	Carlos Issa	28	Lawyer	São Paulo	Evicted: Day 57	7th
6	Iran Gomes	29	Composer	Rio de Janeiro	Evicted: Day 64	6th
6	Gustavo Aguiar	28	Former monk	Belo Horizonte	Evicted: Day 71	5th
6	Agustinho Mendonça	31	Supermarket manager	Rio de Janeiro	Evicted: Day 76	4th
6	Rafael Valente	26	Math teacher	São José	Finalist: Day 78	3rd
6	Mariana Felício	21	Fisherwoman	Botucatu	Finalist: Day 78	Runner-Up
6	Mara Viana	33	Nurse	Porto Seguro	Finalist: Day 78	Winner
7	Fernando Orozco	27	Production engineer	São Paulo	Ejected: Day 01	17th
7	Juliana Regueiro	27	Translator	Brasília	Evicted: Day 03	16th
7	Daniel Bellangero	27	Sports coach	Barueri	Evicted: Day 08	15th
7	Liane de Souza	27	Student	Florianópolis	Evicted: Day 15	14th
7	Alan Pierre Miranda	23	Student	Recife	Evicted: Day 22	13th
7	Felipe Cobra	30	Skateboarder	Rio de Janeiro	Evicted: Day 29	12th
7	Fernando Luiz Bacalow	23	Banking	Osasco	Evicted: Day 36	11th
7	Bruno Jácome	26	Musician	Timóteo	Evicted: Day 43	10th
7	Íris Stefanelli	27	Nursing student	Uberlândia	Evicted: Day 50	9th
7	Flávia Viana	22	Promoter	São Paulo	Evicted: Day 57	8th
7	Fani Pacheco	24	Law student	Nova Iguaçu	Evicted: Day 64	7th
7	Alberto Pimentel	30	Financial analyst	Belo Horizonte	Evicted: Day 71	6th
7	Airton Cabral	25	Designer	Rio de Janeiro	Evicted: Day 03; Evicted: Day 76	5th
7	Analy Rosa	30	Disc jockey	Curitiba	Evicted: Day 78	4th
7	Bruna Tavares	23	Student	Taió	Evicted: Day 83	3rd
7	Carollini Honorio	21	Student	Rio de Janeiro	Finalist: Day 85	Runner-Up
7	Diego Gasques	26	Webdesigner	São Bernardo	Finalist: Day 85	Winner
8	Jaqueline Khury	23	Model	São Paulo	Evicted: Day 08	14th
8	Rafael Memória	24	Medical student	Fortaleza	Evicted: Day 15	13th
8	Alexandre Scaquette	24	Model	Limeira	Evicted: Day 22	12th
8	Thalita Lippi	29	Actress	Rio de Janeiro	Evicted: Day 29	11th
8	Bianca Jahara	28	Fashion producer	Rio de Janeiro	Evicted: Day 36	10th
8	Fernando Mesquita	25	Account manager	Rio de Janeiro	Evicted: Day 43	9th
8	Felipe Basilio	21	Student	São Paulo	Evicted: Day 50	8th
8	Juliana Góes	22	Journalism student	Santos	Evicted: Day 57	7th
8	Marcelo Arantes	31	Doctor	Uberlândia	Evicted: Day 64	6th
8	Thatiana Bione	21	English teacher	Brasília	Evicted: Day 71	5th
8	Marcos Parmagnani	26	Student	Vitória	Evicted: Day 75	4th
8	Natália Casassola	22	Model	Passo Fundo	Evicted: Day 76	3rd
8	Gyselle Soares	24	Student	Teresina	Finalist: Day 78	Runner-Up
8	Rafinha Ribeiro	26	Musician	Campinas	Finalist: Day 78	Winner
9	Daniel Gevaerd	26	Manager	Campo Grande	Evicted: Bubble	19th–20th
9	Maíra Britto	25	Speech	Brasília	Evicted: Bubble	19th–20th
9	Michelle Costa	24	Law student	Recife	Evicted: Day 08	18th
9	Norberto Santos	63	Radio host	São Carlos	Evicted: Day 15	17th
9	Leonardo Jancu	25	Student	São Paulo	Walked: Day 21	16th
9	Alexandre da Silva	35	Businessman	Olinda	Evicted: Day 22	15th
9	Newton Siqueira	29	Model	Porto Alegre	Evicted: Day 29	14th
9	Emanuel Milchevski	24	Student	São Bento do Sul	Evicted: Day 36	13th
9	André de Almeida	34	Cowboy	São Bernardo do Campo	Evicted: Day 43	12th
9	Mirla Prado	27	Lawyer	Belém	Evicted: Day 48	11th
9	Ralf Krause	32	Manager	São Paulo	Evicted: Day 50	10th
9	Maíra Cardi	26	TV presenter	São Caetano do Sul	Evicted: Day 57	9th
9	Naiá Giannocaro	61	Promoter	São Paulo	Evicted: Day 64	8th
9	Milena Fagundes	32	Promoter	Manaus	Evicted: Day 71	7th
9	Josiane Oliveira	30	Singer	Juiz de Fora	Evicted: Day 76	6th
9	Flávio Steffli	26	Promoter	Caxias do Sul	Evicted: Day 78	5th
9	Ana Carolina Madeira	24	Law student	Florianópolis	Evicted: Day 83	4th
9	Francine Piaia	25	Teacher	Rio Grande	Finalist: Day 85	3rd
9	Priscila Pires	26	Journalist	Campo Grande	Finalist: Day 85	Runner-Up
9	Maximiliano Porto	30	Artist	Maricá	Finalist: Day 85	Winner
10	Joseane Oliveira	28	Model	Canoas	Evicted: Day 08	17th
10	Ana Marcela Alves	25	Student	Recife	Evicted: Day 15	16th
10	Tessália Serighelli	22	Advertiser	Curitiba	Evicted: Day 22	15th
10	Alex Vilanova	36	Lawyer	São Paulo	Evicted: Day 27	14th
10	Uilliam Carvalho	24	Dancer	Firmino Alves	Evicted: Day 29	13th
10	Elenita Rodrigues	30	Language teacher & PhD in linguistics	Brasília	Evicted: Day 36	12th
10	Angélica Marques	24	Journalist	Uberlândia	Evicted: Day 43	11th
10	Cláudia Colucci	28	Manager	Ribeirão Preto	Evicted: Day 50	10th
10	Eliéser Ambrosio	25	Agronomist	Maringá	Evicted: Day 57	9th
10	Michel Turtchin	30	Advertiser	São Paulo	Evicted: Day 64	8th
10	Sérgio Franceschini	20	Fashion student	São Paulo	Evicted: Day 69	7th
10	Anamara Barreira	25	Police officer	Juazeiro	Evicted: Day 71	6th
10	Dicésar Ferreira	44	Make-up artist	Londrina	Evicted: Day 75	5th
10	Lia Kheireddine	28	Dancer	São Paulo	Evicted: Day 76	4th
10	Cadu Parga	24	Personal trainer	Rio de Janeiro	Finalist: Day 78	3rd
10	Fernanda Cardoso	28	Dentist	São José	Finalist: Day 78	Runner-Up
10	Marcelo Dourado	37	P.E. teacher	Porto Alegre	Finalist: Day 78	Winner
11	Ariadna Arantes	26	Hair stylist	Rio de Janeiro	Evicted: Day 08	19th
11	Rodrigo Carvalho	26	Administrator	Jaboatão dos Guararapes	Evicted: Day 20	17th–18th
11	Michelly Freitas	27	Promoter	São Paulo	Evicted: Day 20	17th–18th
11	Igor Pachi	29	Barman	São Paulo	Evicted: Day 22	16th
11	Cristiano Naya	33	Engineer	São Paulo	Evicted: Day 29	15th
11	Lucival França	29	Journalist	Salvador	Evicted: Day 34	14th
11	Natália Castro	27	Criminal analyst	Coronel Fabriciano	Evicted: Day 36	13th
11	Adriana Sant'anna	19	Student	Campos dos Goytacazes	Evicted: Day 43	12th
11	Diogo Pretto	24	Dancer	Salvador	Evicted: Day 50	10th–11th
11	Janaína dos Santos	25	Dancer	São Paulo	Evicted: Day 50	10th–11th
11	Talula Pascoli	29	Model	São Paulo	Evicted: Day 57	9th
11	Maurício Joaquim	27	Musician	Rio de Janeiro	Evicted: Day 15; Evicted: Day 62	8th
11	Jaqueline Faria	27	Dancer	Rio de Janeiro	Evicted: Day 64	7th
11	Paula Leite	23	Student	Boa Vista	Evicted: Day 69	6th
11	Rodrigão Gomes	22	Model	Curitiba	Evicted: Day 71	5th
11	Diana Balsini	29	Producer	Rio de Janeiro	Evicted: Day 76	4th
11	Daniel Rolim	40	Administrator	Recife	Finalist: Day 78	3rd
11	Wesley Schunk	24	Doctor	Vila Velha	Finalist: Day 78	Runner-Up
11	Maria Melilo	27	Actress	São Paulo	Finalist: Day 78	Winner
12	Daniel Echaniz	30	Model	São Paulo	Ejected: Day 07	16th
12	Analice de Souza	26	Bar owner	Belo Horizonte	Evicted: Day 08	15th
12	Jakeline Leal	22	Husbandry student	Feira de Santana	Evicted: Day 15	14th
12	Mayara Medeiros	23	Art educator	Jales	Evicted: Day 22	13th
12	Ronaldo Peres	31	Salesman	Jacareí	Evicted: Day 29	12th
12	João Mauricio Leite	34	Cattle breeder	Goiânia	Evicted: Day 36	11th
12	Laisa Portela	23	Medical student	Porto Alegre	Evicted: Day 43	10th
12	Rafa Oliveira	35	Lighting designer	Rio de Janeiro	Evicted: Day 50	9th
12	Renata Dávila	21	Psychology student	Belo Horizonte	Evicted: Day 57	8th
12	Yuri Fernandes	26	Muay thay trainer	Goiânia	Evicted: Day 64	7th
12	Monique Amin	23	Student	Florianópolis	Evicted: Day 69	6th
12	João Carvalho	46	Trade representative	Divinópolis	Evicted: Day 71	5th
12	Kelly Medeiros	25	Sales assistant	Belo Horizonte	Evicted: Day 76	4th
12	Jonas Sulzbach	25	Model	Lajeado	Evicted: Day 78	3rd
12	Fabiana Teixeira	35	Poster Girl	Ribeirão Preto	Finalist: Day 80	Runner-Up
12	Fael Cordeiro	25	Veterinarian	Aral Moreira	Finalist: Day 80	Winner
13	Samara Pessato	30	Saleswoman	São Paulo	Evicted: Bubble	18th–21st
13	Kelly Baron	26	Secretaire	Curitiba	Evicted: Bubble	18th–21st
13	Bernardo Lima	29	Businessman	Florianópolis	Evicted: Bubble	18th–21st
13	André Coelho	25	Lawyer	Brasília	Evicted: Bubble	18th–21st
13	Kleber Bambam	35	Disc jockey	Campinas	Walked: Day 05	17th
13	Aline Mattos	31	Hostess	Rio de Janeiro	Evicted: Day 08	16th
13	Dhomini Ferreira	40	Businessman	Goiânia	Evicted: Day 15	15th
13	Aslan Cabral	31	Artist	Recife	Evicted: Day 22	14th
13	Yuri Fernandes	27	Muay thai trainer	Goiânia	Evicted: Day 29	13th
13	Marien Carretero	25	Flamenco dancer	Belo Horizonte	Evicted: Day 36	12th
13	Ivan Marcondes	26	English teacher	Rio Claro	Evicted: Day 43	11th
13	Eliéser Ambrosio	28	Model	Goioerê	Evicted: Day 50	10th
13	Marcello Soares	31	Personal trainer	Rio de Janeiro	Evicted: Day 55	9th
13	Anamara Barreira	28	Former police officer	Juazeiro	Evicted: Day 57	8th
13	Kamilla Salgado	25	Model	Belém	Evicted: Day 64	7th
13	Fani Pacheco	30	TV presenter	Nova Iguaçu	Evicted: Day 69	6th
13	André Martinelli	24	Businessman	Vitória	Evicted: Day 71	5th
13	Natália Casassola	27	Model	Passo Fundo	Evicted: Day 76	4th
13	Andressa Ganacin	23	Beautician	Cianorte	Finalist: Day 78	3rd
13	Nasser Rodrigues	24	Salesman	Porto Alegre	Finalist: Day 78	Runner-Up
13	Fernanda Keulla	26	Lawyer	Belo Horizonte	Finalist: Day 78	Winner
14	João Almeida	31	Fortune-teller	Rio de Janeiro	Evicted: Day 03	20th
14	Alisson Gomes	27	Teacher	Contagem	Evicted: Day 06	19th
14	Rodrigo Lima	28	Chef	Recife	Evicted: Day 08	18th
14	Princy Cavalcante	32	Real estate agent	Goiânia	Evicted: Day 10	17th
14	Bella Maia	27	Ballet dancer	Recife	Evicted: Day 13	16th
14	Vagner Lara	37	Businessman	São Paulo	Evicted: Day 15	15th
14	Amanda Gontijo	23	Engineering student	Divinópolis	Evicted: Day 22	14th
14	Junior Gianetti	27	Sales supervisor	São Paulo	Evicted: Day 29	13th
14	Letícia Santiago	27	Bachelor of law	Belo Horizonte	Evicted: Day 36	12th
14	Roni Mazon	27	Model	Iacri	Evicted: Day 43	11th
14	Franciele Almeida	24	Event producer	Santa Rosa	Evicted: Day 50	10th
14	Aline Dahlen	33	Actress	Porto Alegre	Evicted: Day 57	9th
14	Diego Grossi	31	Advertiser	Rio de Janeiro	Evicted: Day 64	8th
14	Cássio Lanes	22	Advertising student	Alvorada	Evicted: Day 69	7th
14	Tatiele Polyana	22	Miss & model	Cianorte	Evicted: Day 71	6th
14	Valter Araújo	35	Rapper	São Paulo	Evicted: Day 73	5th
14	Marcelo Zagonel	26	Administrator	Curitiba	Evicted: Day 76	4th
14	Clara Aguilar	25	Businesswoman	São Paulo	Finalist: Day 78	3rd
14	Angela Munhoz	26	Lawyer	São Roque	Finalist: Day 78	Runner-Up
14	Vanessa Mesquita	27	Model	São Paulo	Finalist: Day 78	Winner
15	Julia Nunes	23	Fashion designer	Brasília	Evicted: Day 06	15th
15	Francieli Medeiros	36	Criminal conciliator	Porto Alegre	Evicted: Day 08	14th
15	Douglas Ferreira	29	Delivery man	São Paulo	Evicted: Day 15	13th
15	Marco Marcon	35	Theologian	Curitiba	Evicted: Day 22	12th
15	Aline Gotschalg	24	Fashion student	Belo Horizonte	Evicted: Day 29	11th
15	Angélica Ramos	33	Nursing assistant	Embu das Artes	Evicted: Day 36	10th
15	Talita Araújo	22	Flight attendant	Goiânia	Evicted: Day 43	9th
15	Tamires Peloso	24	Dentist	São Paulo	Walked: Day 48	8th
15	Luan Patricio	23	Manager	Rio de Janeiro	Evicted: Day 50	7th
15	Rafael Licks	21	Management student	Canela	Evicted: Day 57	6th
15	Mariza Moreira	51	Art teacher	Recife	Evicted: Day 64	5th
15	Adrilles Jorge	40	Writer	Belo Horizonte	Evicted: Day 71	4th
15	Fernando Medeiros	32	Cultural producer	Rio de Janeiro	Evicted: Day 76	3rd
15	Amanda Djehdian	28	Businesswoman	São Paulo	Finalist: Day 78	Runner-Up
15	Cézar Lima	30	Law student	Guarapuava	Finalist: Day 78	Winner
16	William Oliveira	35	Safety	São Paulo	Evicted: Day 06	15th–16th
16	Fernanda Liberato	28	Writer & model	Belo Horizonte	Evicted: Day 06	15th–16th
16	Harumi Ishihara	64	Journalist	São Paulo	Evicted: Day 08	14th
16	Laércio de Moura	53	Tattoo designer	Curitiba	Evicted: Day 15	13th
16	Alan Marinho	34	Doctor of Philosophy	Natal	Walked: Day 18	12th
16	Daniel Manzieri	38	Manager	Rio de Janeiro	Evicted: Day 29	11th
16	Juliana Dias	31	Dancer	São Paulo	Evicted: Day 36	10th
16	Tamiel Khan	41	Ecology teacher	Goiânia	Evicted: Day 43	9th
16	Ana Paula Renault	34	Journalist	Belo Horizonte	Ejected: Day 47	8th
16	Adélia Soares	36	Lawyer	Suzano	Evicted: Day 50	7th
16	Renan Oliveira	29	Model	Amparo	Evicted: Day 57	6th
16	Matheus Lisboa	25	Electrical engineer	Barra Longa	Evicted: Day 64	5th
16	Geralda Diniz	63	Retired teacher	Curvelo	Evicted: Day 74	4th
16	Ronan Veiga	27	Philosophy student	Curitiba	Evicted: Day 76	3rd
16	Maria Claudia Macedo	19	Youtuber	Santa Cruz	Finalist: Day 78	Runner-Up
16	Munik Nunes	19	Student	Goiânia	Finalist: Day 78	Winner
17	Antônio Rafaski	23	Entertainment promoter	Vitória	Evicted: Day 07	16th–17th
17	Mayla Araújo	20	Student	Eldorado do Sul	Evicted: Day 07	16th–17th
17	Gabriela Flor Bitencourt	27	Dancer	Salvador	Evicted: Day 09	15th
17	Mayara Motti	26	Bachelor of law	Belo Horizonte	Evicted: Day 16	14th
17	Luiz Felipe Ribeiro	28	Merchant	Maceió	Evicted: Day 23	13th
17	Manoel Rafaski	23	Entertainment promoter	Vitória	Evicted: Day 30	12th
17	Elis Gonçalves	40	Merchant	Taguatinga	Evicted: Day 37	11th
17	Pedro Falcão	29	Journalist	São Paulo	Evicted: Day 44	10th
17	Roberta Freitas	21	Student	São Paulo	Evicted: Day 51	9th
17	Rômulo Neves	39	Diplomat	Brasília	Evicted: Day 58	8th
17	Daniel Pontes	41	Traffic guard	Ferraz de Vasconcelos	Evicted: Day 64	7th
17	Ilmar Fonseca	38	Cook & lawyer	Campo Grande	Evicted: Day 72	6th
17	Marinalva de Almeida	39	Paralympic athlete	Santa Isabel do Ivaí	Evicted: Day 77	5th
17	Marcos Härter	37	Plastic surgeon	Porto Alegre	Ejected: Day 78	4th
17	Ieda Wobeto	70	Retired	Canoas	Finalist: Day 81	3rd
17	Vivian Amorim	23	Lawyer	Manaus	Finalist: Day 81	Runner-Up
17	Emilly Araújo	20	Student	Eldorado do Sul	Finalist: Day 81	Winner
18	Eva Lima	51	Sales director	Belém	Evicted: Day 07	18th–19th
18	Jorge Lima	28	Production engineer	Rio de Janeiro	Evicted: Day 07	18th–19th
18	Mara Telles	53	Political scientist	Governador Valadares	Evicted: Day 09	17th
18	Jaqueline Grohalski	23	Biomedical	Rolim de Moura	Evicted: Day 16	16th
18	Ana Paula Costa	23	Journalism student	São José	Evicted: Day 23	15th
18	Nayara de Deus	33	Journalist	Santo André	Evicted: Day 30	14th
18	Lucas Fernandes	27	Businessman	Fortaleza	Evicted: Day 37	13th
18	Mahmoud Baydoun	27	Sexologist	Manaus	Evicted: Day 44	12th
18	Patrícia Leitte	32	Civil servant	Icó	Evicted: Day 51	11th
18	Diego Sabádo	31	Writer	Belém	Evicted: Day 58	10th
18	Caruso Junior	34	Advertising professional	São Paulo	Evicted: Day 65	9th
18	Wagner Santiago	35	Visual artist	Curitiba	Evicted: Day 72	8th
18	Viegas de Carvalho	33	Musician	São Paulo	Evicted: Day 77	7th
18	Jéssica Mueller	26	Personal trainer	Florianópolis	Evicted: Day 79	6th
18	Breno Simões	29	Architect	Goiânia	Evicted: Day 85	5th
18	Paula Amorim	29	Businesswoman	Belo Horizonte	Evicted: Day 86	4th
18	Ana Clara Lima; Ayrton Lima	20; 56	Journalism student Systems analyst	Rio de Janeiro	Finalists: Day 88	3rd
18	Kaysar Dadour	28	Waiter	Aleppo, Syria	Finalist: Day 88	Runner-Up
18	Gleici Damasceno	23	Psychology student	Rio Branco	Finalist: Day 88	Winner
19	Vinicius Póvoa	40	Plastic artist & advertising	Belo Horizonte	Evicted: Day 08	17th
19	Vanderson Brito	35	Biologist & indigenous social educator	Rio Branco	Ejected: Day 09	16th
19	Gustavo Soares	37	Ophthalmologist	São Paulo	Evicted: Day 15	15th
19	Hana Khalil	22	Bachelor in Cinema & Youtuber	Rio de Janeiro	Evicted: Day 22	14th
19	Diego Wantowsky	30	Businessman & horse breeder	Rio Negrinho	Evicted: Day 29	13th
19	Maycon Santos	27	Barman & cheese seller	Piumhi	Evicted: Day 36	12th
19	Isabella Cecchi	24	Medical student	Natal	Evicted: Day 43	11th
19	Tereza Souza	52	Psychoanalyst & licensed practical nurse	Arcoverde	Evicted: Day 57	10th
19	Danrley Ferreira	19	Biology student & popsicle seller	Rio de Janeiro	Evicted: Day 64	9th
19	Elana Valenária	25	Agronomic engineer	Bom Jesus	Evicted: Day 71	8th
19	Rodrigo França	40	Human rights social scientist & dramaturgist	Rio de Janeiro	Evicted: Day 78	7th
19	Gabriela Hebling	32	Graphic designer & percussionist	Ribeirão Preto	Evicted: Day 83	6th
19	Rízia Cerqueira	24	Journalist	São Miguel dos Campos	Evicted: Day 85	5th
19	Hariany Almeida	21	Fashion design student	Senador Canedo	Ejected: Day 87	4th
19	Carolina Peixinho	33	Businesswoman & advertising	Salvador	Evicted: Day 87	3rd
19	Alan Possamai	26	Administrator & entrepreneur	Criciúma	Finalist: Day 88	Runner-Up
19	Paula von Sperling	28	Bachelor in Law	Lagoa Santa	Finalist: Day 88	Winner
20	Renata Dornelles	32	Physical education teacher	Campo Grande	Evicted: Bubble	21st–22nd
20	Daniel Caon	26	Songwriter	Linhares	Evicted: Bubble	21st–22nd
20	Lucas Chumbo	24	Professional surfer	Saquarema	Evicted: Day 08	20th
20	Petrix Barbosa	27	Gymnast	São Paulo	Evicted: Day 15	19th
20	Hadson Nery	38	Former football player	Belém	Evicted: Day 22	18th
20	Lucas Gallina	26	Physiotherapist	Florianópolis	Evicted: Day 29	17th
20	Bianca Andrade	25	Digital influencer & businesswoman	Rio de Janeiro	Evicted: Day 36	16th
20	Guilherme Napolitano	28	Model	Presidente Prudente	Evicted: Day 43	15th
20	Victor Hugo Teixeira	25	Public health scientist & psychologist	Imperatriz	Evicted: Day 50	14th
20	Pyong Lee	27	Hypnologist	São Paulo	Evicted: Day 57	13th
20	Daniel Lenhardt	22	Actor	Selbach	Evicted: Day 64	12th
20	Felipe Prior	27	Architect	São Paulo	Evicted: Day 71	11th
20	Gabi Martins	23	Singer	Belo Horizonte	Evicted: Day 76	10th
20	Marcela Mc Gowan	31	Gynecologist & obstetrician	Rancharia	Evicted: Day 78	9th
20	Flayslane Raiane	25	Singer	Nova Floresta	Evicted: Day 83	8th
20	Gizelly Bicalho	28	Lawyer	Iúna	Evicted: Day 85	7th
20	Ivy Moraes	27	Model	Belo Horizonte	Evicted: Day 90	6th
20	Mari Gonzalez	25	Digital influencer	Salvador	Evicted: Day 92	5th
20	Babu Santana	40	Actor	Rio de Janeiro	Evicted: Day 96	4th
20	Manu Gavassi	27	Actress & singer	São Paulo	Finalist: Day 98	3rd
20	Rafa Kalimann	26	Digital influencer	Campina Verde	Finalist: Day 98	Runner-Up
20	Thelma Assis	35	Anesthesiologist	São Paulo	Finalist: Day 98	Winner
21	Kerline Cardoso	28	Model & digital influencer	Fortaleza	Evicted: Day 09	20th
21	Lucas Penteado	24	Actor	São Paulo	Walked: Day 14	19th
21	Arcrebiano Araújo	29	Model	Vila Velha	Evicted: Day 16	18th
21	Nego Di	26	Comedian	Porto Alegre	Evicted: Day 23	17th
21	Karol Conká	35	Singer & TV presenter	Curitiba	Evicted: Day 30	16th
21	Lumena Aleluia	29	Psychologist & DJ	Salvador	Evicted: Day 37	15th
21	Projota	34	Singer & rapper	São Paulo	Evicted: Day 51	14th
21	Carla Diaz	30	Actress	São Paulo	Evicted: Day 58	13th
21	Sarah Andrade	29	Digital marketing consultant	Brasília	Evicted: Day 65	12th
21	Rodolffo Matthaus	32	Singer	Uruaçu	Evicted: Day 72	11th
21	Thaís Braz	27	Dentist surgeon	Luziânia	Evicted: Day 79	10th
21	Caio Afiune	32	Farmer	Anápolis	Evicted: Day 86	9th
21	João Luiz Pedrosa	25	Geography teacher	Santos Dumont	Evicted: Day 88	8th
21	Viih Tube	20	Actress & YouTuber	Sorocaba	Evicted: Day 91	7th
21	Arthur Picoli	26	Crossfit instructor	Conduru	Evicted: Day 93	6th
21	Pocah	26	Singer	Queimados	Evicted: Day 95	5th
21	Gilberto Nogueira	29	Doctorate in Economy	Paulista	Evicted: Day 98	4th
21	Fiuk	30	Actor & singer	São Paulo	Finalist: Day 100	3rd
21	Camilla de Lucas	26	Digital influencer	Nova Iguaçu	Finalist: Day 100	Runner-Up
21	Juliette Freire	31	Lawyer & makeup artist	Campina Grande	Finalist: Day 100	Winner
22	Luciano Estevan	28	Actor & dancer	Florianópolis	Evicted: Day 09	22nd
22	Rodrigo Mussi	36	Commercial manager	São José dos Campos	Evicted: Day 16	21st
22	Naiara Azevedo	32	Singer	Farol	Evicted: Day 23	20th
22	Maria Andrade	21	Actress & singer	Rio de Janeiro	Ejected: Day 30	19th
22	Bárbara Heck	29	Public relations & model	Novo Hamburgo	Evicted: Day 30	18th
22	Brunna Gonçalves	30	Dancer & digital influencer	Nilópolis	Evicted: Day 37	17th
22	Tiago Abravanel	34	Actor & TV presenter	São Paulo	Walked: Day 42	16th
22	Larissa Tomásia	25	Digital influencer & marketing coordinator	Limoeiro	Evicted: Day 44	15th
22	Jade Picon	20	Digital influencer & businesswoman	São Paulo	Evicted: Day 51	14th
22	Vinicius de Sousa	23	Bachelor of law	Crato	Evicted: Day 58	13th
22	Laís Caldas	30	Doctor	Crixás	Evicted: Day 65	12th
22	Lucas Bissoli	31	Engineer & medicine student	Vila Velha	Evicted: Day 72	11th
22	Eslovênia Marques	25	Model & marketing student	João Pessoa	Evicted: Day 77	10th
22	Linn da Quebrada	31	Actress & singer	São Paulo	Evicted: Day 84	9th
22	Natália Deodato	22	Nail designer & model	Belo Horizonte	Evicted: Day 86	8th
22	Jessilane Alves	26	Biologist & biology teacher	Bom Jesus da Lapa	Evicted: Day 91	7th
22	Gustavo Marsengo	31	Bachelor of law	Curitiba	Evicted: Day 93	6th
22	Pedro Scooby	33	Surfer	Rio de Janeiro	Evicted: Day 95	5th
22	Eliezer do Carmo	31	Designer & businessman	Volta Redonda	Evicted: Day 98	4th
22	Douglas Silva	33	Actor	Rio de Janeiro	Finalist: Day 100	3rd
22	Paulo André Camilo	23	Sprinter	Santo André	Finalist: Day 100	Runner-Up
22	Arthur Aguiar	32	Actor & singer	Rio de Janeiro	Finalist: Day 100	Winner
23	Manoel Vicente	32	Psychiatrist	Cuiabá	Evicted: Bubble	23rd–24th
23	Giovanna Leão	25	Businesswoman	Campinas	Evicted: Bubble	23rd–24th
23	Marília Miranda	32	Make up artist & digital influencer	Natal	Evicted: Day 11	22nd
23	Gabriel Tavares	24	Administrator & model	Ribeirão Preto	Evicted: Day 16	21st
23	Tina Calamba	29	Marketing analyst & model	Huambo, Angola	Evicted: Day 23	20th
23	Paula Freitas	28	Biomedical	Jacundá	Evicted: Day 30	19th
23	Bruno Nogueira	32	Pharmacy attendant	São José da Laje	Walked: Day 33	18th
23	Cristian Vanelli	32	Businessman	Caxias do Sul	Evicted: Day 37	17th
23	Gustavo Benedetti	27	Farmer & businessman	Sinop	Evicted: Day 41	16th
23	Key Alves	23	Volleyball player	Bauru	Evicted: Day 51	15th
23	MC Guimê	30	Singer-songwriter	Osasco	Ejected: Day 60	13th–14th
23	Antônio Cara de Sapato	32	MMA fighter	João Pessoa	Ejected: Day 60	13th–14th
23	Fred Carneiro	33	Journalist & digital influencer	São Paulo	Evicted: Day 65	12th
23	Gabriel Santana	23	Actor	Rio de Janeiro	Evicted: Day 72	11th
23	Kassia Marvvila	23	Singer	Rio de Janeiro	Evicted: Day 79	10th
23	Fred Nicácio	35	Doctor & physiotherapist	Campos dos Goytacazes	Evicted: Day 44; Evicted: Day 86	9th
23	Cezar Black	34	Nurse	Salvador	Evicted: Day 88	8th
23	Sarah Aline Rodrigues	25	Psychologist & diversity analyst	Osasco	Evicted: Day 91	7th
23	Domitila Barros	38	Model & social activist	Recife	Evicted: Day 93	6th
23	Ricardo Camargo	30	Biomedical	Aracaju	Evicted: Day 95	5th
23	Larissa Santos	24	Physical education teacher	Sombrio	Evicted: Day 58; Evicted: Day 98	4th
23	Bruna Griphao	23	Actress	Rio de Janeiro	Finalist: Day 100	3rd
23	Aline Wirley	41	Singer	Cachoeira Paulista	Finalist: Day 100	Runner-Up
23	Amanda Meirelles	31	Doctor	Astorga	Finalist: Day 100	Winner
24	Carolina Ferreira	27	Stylist & model	Rio de Janeiro	Evicted: Annex	27th–31st
24	Juliana Xavier	27	Make up artist	Florianópolis	Evicted: Annex	27th–31st
24	Jorge Mateus Viana	31	Dentist	Recife	Evicted: Annex	27th–31st
24	Caio Andrade	29	Nutritionist	Salvador	Evicted: Annex	27th–31st
24	Plínio Simões	30	Jewelry designer	Salvador	Evicted: Annex	27th–31st
24	Maycon Cosmer	35	School cook	Tijucas	Evicted: Day 04	26th
24	Thalyta Alves	26	Lawyer	Belo Horizonte	Evicted: Day 07	25th
24	Lucas Pizane	22	Musician	Itaparica	Evicted: Day 09	24th
24	Vanessa Lopes	22	Digital influencer	Brasília	Walked: Day 12	23rd
24	Nizam Hayek	32	International account executive	São Paulo	Evicted: Day 14	22nd
24	Vinícius Rodrigues	29	Paralympic athlete	Rosana	Evicted: Day 16	21st
24	Lucas Luigi	28	Salesman	Rio de Janeiro	Evicted: Day 23	20th
24	Juninho Silva	41	Motorcycle taxi driver	Rio de Janeiro	Evicted: Day 30	19th
24	Marcus Vinicius Ferreira	30	Flight attendant	Belém	Evicted: Day 37	18th
24	Deniziane Ferreira	29	Physiotherapist	Esmeraldas	Evicted: Day 44	17th
24	Rodriguinho	45	Singer	Bauru	Evicted: Day 51	16th
24	Wanessa Camargo	41	Singer	Goiânia	Ejected: Day 55	15th
24	Michel Nogueira	30	Geography teacher	Belo Horizonte	Evicted: Day 58	14th
24	Yasmin Brunet	35	Model & businesswoman	Rio de Janeiro	Evicted: Day 65	13th
24	Raquele Cardozo	22	Confectioner & student	Conceição da Barra	Evicted: Day 72	12th
24	Leidy Elin Alvarenga	26	Hairdresser & cashier	São Gonçalo	Evicted: Day 79	11th
24	Fernanda Bande	32	Baker & model	Niterói	Evicted: Day 84	10th
24	Giovanna Pitel	24	Social worker	Maceió	Evicted: Day 86	9th
24	MC Bin Laden	30	Singer	São Paulo	Evicted: Day 88	8th
24	Giovanna Lima	27	Nutritionist	Belo Horizonte	Evicted: Day 91	7th
24	Lucas Henrique Ferreira	29	Physical education teacher	Rio de Janeiro	Evicted: Day 93	6th
24	Beatriz Reis	23	Clothing seller	Guarulhos	Evicted: Day 95	5th
24	Alane Dias	24	Ballet dancer & model	Belém	Evicted: Day 98	4th
24	Isabelle Nogueira	31	Dancer & digital influencer	Manaus	Finalist: Day 100	3rd
24	Matteus Amaral	27	Agricultural engineering student	Alegrete	Finalist: Day 100	Runner-Up
24	Davi Brito	21	App driver	Salvador	Finalist: Day 100	Winner
25	Cléber Santana	24	Geography teacher	Jequié	Evicted: Wildcard	25th–28th
25	Joseane Monteiro	41	Nursing technician	Jequié	Evicted: Wildcard	25th–28th
25	Nicole Oliveira	28	Law student	São José dos Campos	Evicted: Wildcard	25th–28th
25	Paula Oliveira	48	Parliamentary advisor	São José dos Campos	Evicted: Wildcard	25th–28th
25	Marcelo Prata	38	Public servant	Manaus	Evicted: Day 09	23rd–24th
25	Arleane Marques	34	Digital influencer	Manaus	Evicted: Day 09	23rd–24th
25	Edilberto Simões	42	Circus owner & clown	Elói Mendes	Evicted: Day 16	21st–22nd
25	Raissa Simões	19	Circus artist	Ubá	Evicted: Day 16	21st–22nd
25	Giovanna Jacobina	26	Veterinarian	Campo Grande	Evicted: Day 23	20th
25	Gabriel Yoshimoto	30	Model & event promoter	São Paulo	Evicted: Day 30	19th
25	Mateus Pires	28	Architect	São José dos Campos	Evicted: Day 37	18th
25	Diogo Almeida	40	Actor & psychologist	Rio de Janeiro	Evicted: Day 44	17th
25	Camilla Maia	34	Hair braider	Rio de Janeiro	Evicted: Day 51	16th
25	Thamiris Maia	33	Nutritionist	Rio de Janeiro	Evicted: Day 58	15th
25	Gracyanne Barbosa	42	Fitness model	Campo Grande	Evicted: Day 65	14th
25	Aline Patriarca	32	Military police officer	Salvador	Evicted: Day 72	13th
25	Eva Pacheco	31	Dancer & physiotherapist	Fortaleza	Evicted: Day 77	12th
25	Vilma Nascimento	68	Nutrition student	Aracaju	Evicted: Day 79	11th
25	Daniele Hypólito	40	Former artistic gymnast	Santo André	Evicted: Day 84	10th
25	João Gabriel Siqueira	21	Rodeo lifeguard	Goiatuba	Evicted: Day 86	9th
25	Maike Cruz	30	Sales representative	São Paulo	Evicted: Day 88	8th
25	Vinícius Nascimento	28	Event promoter	Nazaré	Evicted: Day 91	7th
25	Joselma Silva	54	Housewife	Olinda	Evicted: Day 93	6th
25	Diego Hypólito	38	Former artistic gymnast	Santo André	Evicted: Day 95	5th
25	Vitória Strada	28	Actress	Porto Alegre	Evicted: Day 98	4th
25	João Pedro Siqueira	21	Rodeo lifeguard	Goiatuba	Finalist: Day 100	3rd
25	Guilherme Vilar	27	Geriatric physiotherapist	Olinda	Finalist: Day 100	Runner-Up
25	Renata Saldanha	32	Dancer	Fortaleza	Finalist: Day 100	Winner

== Notes ==
^{^1} Contestant's age at the time the season was filmed.
