= Aline Dahlen =

Brazilian actress and bodybuilder

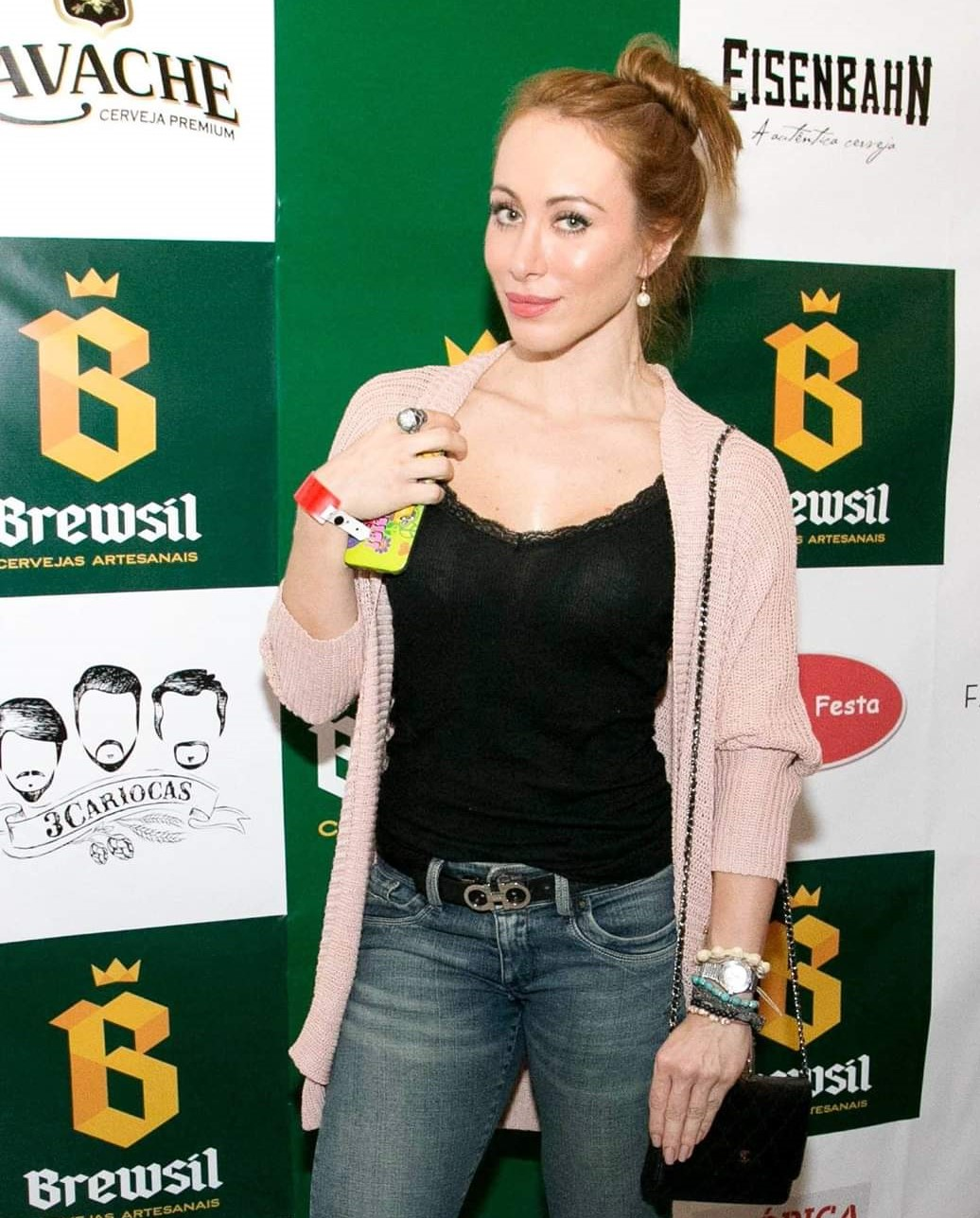
- Aline Moraes in 2015
- Born: Aline Moraes Dahlen Ganthz
- Occupation: Actress
- Years active: 2006–present

Aline Moraes Dahlen Ganthz, also known as Liz Moraes, is a Brazilian actress and bodybuilder. Known for her work in television and theatre, she gained national recognition for her roles in telenovelas of Rede Globo, playing characters such as Cintia in Pé na Jaca (2007), Rapunzel in Sítio do Picapau Amarelo (2007), Nívea in Faça Sua História (2008), and Gaúcha in Clandestinos (2010), among others. In 2014, she participated in Big Brother Brasil 14. In 2021, she was crowned the European champion in the Diva Fitness Model category at World Beauty Fitness & Fashion.

== Biography ==
Aline Moraes Dahlen studied journalism and also took courses in medicine and law. In addition to her acting career, she pursued literary interests including writing poetry and theatrical plays. After studying at the Teatro Escola de Porto Alegre, she appeared in several amateur and professional plays in southern Brazil, before moving to Rio de Janeiro. While working as a model for 40 Graus Models and studying at the Casa das Artes de Laranjeiras, she began auditioning for roles at Rede Globo. She was selected as one of 20 newcomers from a pool of 300 applicants to join the cast of the telenovela Cobras & Lagartos, directed by Wolf Maya. She subsequently made guest appearances in the telenovelas O Profeta and Pé na Jaca. She later appeared in the television series Guerra e Paz, Faça Sua História, and Clandestinos. She also appeared in the children's series Sítio do Picapau Amarelo, the teen soap opera Malhação, the telenovela Gabriela, and made a guest appearance in the remake of Guerra dos Sexos.

In 2014, Aline was a contestant in Big Brother Brasil 14. She later appeared on Zorra Total. In 2016, she was hired as a host for Studio Pampa, a program telecast on Rede Pampa, the Porto Alegre affiliate of RedeTV!.

Following her mother's death, Aline decided to move to London and pursue a career in bodybuilding. In February 2021, she won a gold medal in the Wellness category at the Dubai Muscle Classic bodybuilding championship in Dubai. In November 2021, Aline was crowned the European champion in the Diva Fitness Model category at World Beauty Fitness & Fashion Inc.

== Personal life ==
Aline is openly bisexual. In July 2022, shortly after her departure from the reality show Ilha Record, she revealed that she was in a same-sex relationship with Melina Requião.

== Filmography ==
=== Telenovelas ===
Year	Title	Character
2006	Cobras & Lagartos	Guest appearance
2007	Pé na Jaca	Cintia
2007	O Profeta	Guest appearance
2007	Sítio do Picapau Amarelo	Rapunzel
2008	Faça Sua História	Nívea
2008	Guerra e Paz	Professor Traficante
2009	Malhação	Guest appearance
2010	Tempos Modernos	Patrícia
2010	Clandestinos	Gaúcha
2011	Lara com Z	Vampire
2011	Macho Man	Guest appearance
2012	Aquele Beijo	Salesperson
2012	Gabriela	Bataclã
2013	Guerra dos Sexos	Joalheira

=== Television shows ===
Year	Title	Character
2011	Zorra Total	Luiza
2011	Domingão do Faustão	Quadro "Como Saio Dessa"
2014	Zorra Total	Gláucia
2014	Zorra Total	Aline
2014	Big Brother Brasil 14	Participant
2016	Studio Pampa	Host
2022	Ilha Record 2	Participant
