= Big Brother Brasil 14 =

- Season 14
- Presented by: Pedro Bial
- No. of days: 78
- No. of housemates: 20
- Winner: Vanessa Mesquita
- Runner-up: Angela Munhoz
- No. of episodes: 78

Release
- Original network: Globo
- Original release: January 14 – April 1, 2014

Season chronology
- ← Previous; Big Brother Brasil 13 Next → Big Brother Brasil 15

Big Brother Brasil 14 was the fourteenth season of Big Brother Brasil which premiered January 14, 2014, with the season finale airing April 1, 2014, on the Rede Globo television network.

The show is produced by Endemol Globo and presented by journalist and interviewer Pedro Bial. The season is officially confirmed since March 2012 as part of a millionaire contract between international Endemol and Rede Globo, which guaranteed the show's rights until 2016.

The grand prize is R$1.5 million with tax allowances, with a R$150,000 prize offered to the runner up and a R$50,000 prize offered to the 3rd place.

For the first time ever, three women reached together the Big Brother final. Also, for the first time, BBB had two female winners in back-to-back seasons.

Fitness model Vanessa Mesquita won the competition over lawyer Angela Munhoz and cam-girl Clara Aguilar with 53% of the final vote.

== Production ==
=== Cast ===
Regional applications were due from March 26, 2013 to September 30, 2013. Regional auditions were held from June 22, 2013 to November 22, 2013 in ten different cities over Brazil.

National applications started on October 1, 2013 until November 15, 2013. The semi-finalist interviews were held late in November 2013 and the final casting interviews took place early in December 2013.

== The game ==
=== Big Brother in fiction ===
A plot line on Rede Globo's primetime telenovela Amor à Vida, involved the character of Valdirene (Tatá Werneck) becoming a Big Brother Brasil housemate.

In the series, having dreamed of competing on the show, Valdirene ends up in a fake Glass house with Murilo (Emílio Orciollo Neto) and Jefferson (Celso Bernini). The trio was joined by blonde bombshell Ellen (Dani Vieira), who instantly became Val's greatest enemy. Ultimately, Valdirene "received" the most votes from the public (who did not actually vote) and secured a place in the Big Brother house.

Valdirene entered the actual Big Brother house on January 15, 2014, and her journey can be described as an emotional rollercoaster. During a 12 hour-stay, Valdirene kissed, celebrated and got involved in arguments with her fellow housemates (the actual Big Brother housemates who were instructed by the producers to play along with her).

In the morning of January 16, 2014, Valdirene was "evicted" after came in last in a fictional elimination challenge. She refused to leave and had to be carried by security on her way out of the house. Real footage of Valdirene in the house aired on the same day during episode 208 of Amor à Vida, with Tatá Werneck's improvisation acting skills being heavily praised by the critics and the public.

=== Big Brother Turbo ===
During the first week, for the first time ever, three housemates were evicted from the House (the first on day 3, the second on day 6 and the third on day 8) after separate rounds of nominations and public vote. This '3 weeks in 1' event was billed by the producers as BBB Turbo. On week 2, three more housemates left the game (the first on day 10, the second on day 13 and the third on day 15), resulting in six housemates evicted from the competition in the first two weeks.

=== Big Mother Brasil ===
On March 8 (day 54), in the International Women's Day, 7 mothers and 2 aunts, relatives of the 9 remaining housemates, entered the Big Brother Brasil house to celebrate that day. This was the twist promised by Boninho, chief director in his Twitter profile. The housemates could not see or touch their relatives because the house was divided by a wall, as occurred in the first week of Big Brother Brasil 9, which divided the house in side A and side B. An improvised house was assembled for the mothers and aunts. They stayed in the house until March 13.

On day 55, relatives had to vote for the housemate they want to win an immunity for week 8's nominations. Sol (Vanessa's mother) and Susi (Cássio's mother) voted for Clara. Ivone (Angela's mom) and Bel (Tatiele's mother) voted for Marcelo. Adriana (Clara's aunt) chose Vanessa. Márcia (Diego's mom) chose Cássio. Ledi (Aline's mom) voted for Diego. Leda (Marcelo's mom) and Zezinha (Valter's aunt) chose Angela. So, Clara, Marcelo and Angela tied with 2 votes each and Zezinha had the casting vote. She chose Angela to be immune.

On day 57, due to Aline's eviction, her mother Ledi, who was the relative most popular among viewers, had to leave the house too.

On day 59, after helping housemates in the HoH competition, mothers and aunts left the house.

=== Power of No ===
Week	Power of No	Total vetoed	Previous HoH	Vetoed housemates
2	Franciele	3	Cássio	Amanda, Roni, Tatiele
3	Letícia	5	Roni	Aline, Diego, Junior, Marcelo, Valter
4	Cássio	2	Cássio	Angela, Vanessa
5	Cássio	2	Marcelo	Aline, Vanessa
6	Clara	5	Clara	Cássio, Marcelo, Roni, Tatiele, Valter
8	Raffle	4	Tatiele	Angela, Cássio, Diego, Marcelo
10	Tatiele	3	Cássio	Angela, Clara, Valter

=== Big Phone ===
Week	Date	Timeslot (BRT)	Housemate	Consequences
3	January 31, 2014	Friday; 11:45pm	Vanessa	See; Note 14
4	February 7, 2014	Friday; 11:15pm	Aline	See; Note 15
5	February 14, 2014	Friday; 11:15pm	Diego	See; Note 18
9	March 16, 2014	Sunday; 11:45pm	Cássio	See; Note 24

== Housemates ==
The cast list was unveiled on January 7, 2014.

(ages stated at time of contest)

Name	Age	Occupation	Hometown	Day entered	Day exited	Result
Vanessa Mesquita	27	Model	São Paulo	1	78	Winner
Angela Munhoz	26	Lawyer	São Roque	1	78	Runner-up
Clara Aguilar	25	Businesswoman	São Paulo	1	78	Third place
Marcelo Zagonel	26	Administrator	Curitiba	1	76	17th Evicted
Valter Araújo	35	Rapper	São Paulo	1	73	16th Evicted
Tatiele Polyana	22	Miss	Cianorte	1	71	15th Evicted
Cássio Lannes	22	Advertising student	Alvorada	1	69	14th Evicted
Diego Grossi	31	Advertiser	Brasília	1	64	13th Evicted
Aline Dahlen	29	Actress	Porto Alegre	1	57	12th Evicted
Franciele Almeida	24	Event producer	Santa Rosa	1	50	11th Evicted
Roni Mazon	27	Model	Iacri	1	43	10th Evicted
Letícia Santiago	27	Bachelor of Law	Belo Horizonte	1	36	9th Evicted
Junior Gianetti	27	Sales supervisor	São Paulo	1	29	8th Evicted
Amanda Gontijo	23	Engineering student	Divinópolis	1	22	7th Evicted
Vagner Lara	37	Businessman	São Paulo	1	15	6th Evicted
Bella Maia	27	Ballet dancer	Recife	1	13	5th Evicted
Princy Cavalcante	32	Real estate agent	Goiânia	1	10	4th Evicted
Rodrigo Lima	28	Chef	Recife	1	8	3rd Evicted
Alisson Gomes	27	Teacher	Contagem	1	6	2nd Evicted
João Almeida	31	Fortune-teller	Rio de Janeiro	1	3	1st Evicted

== Future appearances ==
In 2018, Franciele Grossi (née Almeida) and Diego Grossi appeared as a couple in Power Couple Brasil 3, they finished in 9th place after being ejected because of Diego's violent behaviour towards other housemates.

In 2018, Franciele Grossi appeared in Dancing Brasil 4, she finished in 13th place.

In 2019, Diego Grossi appeared in A Fazenda 11, he finished as 2nd Runner-Up

In 2022, Aline Dahlen appeared in Ilha Record 2, she quit the game, finishing in 12th place.

== Voting history ==
Key
– Orange team
– Purple team

	Week 1			Week 2			Week 3	Week 4	Week 5	Week 6	Week 7	Week 8	Week 9	Week 10		Week 11		
	Day 2	Day 5	Day 7	Day 8	Day 11	Day 14	Week 3	Week 4	Week 5	Week 6	Week 7	Week 8	Week 9	Day 67	Day 69	Day 71	Day 75	Finale
Head of Household	Amanda	Valter	Tatiele	Cássio	Letícia	Roni	Cássio	Marcelo	Clara	Aline	Tatiele	Valter	Cássio	Vanessa	Valter	Marcelo	Angela	(none)
Power of Immunity	(none)						Aline	Junior	Marcelo	Angela	Valter	Tatiele	Marcelo	(none)				
Saved	(none)						Valter	Cássio	Roni	Valter	Cássio	Tatiele	Tatiele	(none)				
Nomination (Twists)	(none)						Marcelo	Aline	Diego	(none)			Vanessa	(none)				
Nomination (HoH)	Valter	Alisson	Angela	Marcelo	Diego	Franciele	Vanessa	Junior	Letícia	Diego	Franciele	Aline	Marcelo	Cássio	Tatiele	Valter	Vanessa	(none)
Nomination (Housemates)	Diego; João	Amanda; Princy	Aline; Rodrigo	Princy; Vanessa	Bella; Franciele	Cássio; Vagner	Amanda	Vanessa	Cássio	Roni	Angela	Marcelo	Diego	Marcelo	Marcelo	Clara	Marcelo	(none)
Vanessa	João	Princy	Aline	Princy	Franciele	Cássio	Aline	Franciele	Cássio	Franciele	Angela	Diego	Diego	Head of Household	Marcelo	Angela	Marcelo	Winner (Day 78)
Angela	Diego	Roni	Rodrigo	Tatiele	Franciele	Diego	Diego	Clara	Cássio	Roni	Clara	Clara	Diego	Clara	Vanessa	Clara	Head of Household	Runner-up (Day 78)
Clara	João	Princy	Aline	Princy	Franciele	Aline	Aline	Franciele	Cássio	Roni	Angela	Marcelo	Diego	Marcelo	Marcelo	Angela	Not eligible	3rd Place (Day 78)
Marcelo	Clara	Rodrigo	Cássio	Vanessa	Vagner	Junior	Junior	Vanessa	Vanessa	Vanessa	Valter	Cássio	Valter	Valter	Clara	Clara	Not eligible	Evicted (Day 76)
Valter	Cássio	Head of Household	Rodrigo	Roni	Amanda	Vagner	Amanda	Vanessa	Marcelo	Roni	Marcelo	Head of Household	Clara	Marcelo	Marcelo	Clara	Evicted (Day 73)	
Tatiele	Clara	Princy	Rodrigo	Franciele	Franciele	Vagner	Franciele	Franciele	Aline	Franciele	Head of Household	Diego	Valter	Valter	Clara	Evicted (Day 71)		
Cássio	Letícia	Marcelo	Marcelo	Head of Household	Clara	Vanessa	Head of Household	Vanessa	Vanessa	Angela	Marcelo	Marcelo	Head of Household	Marcelo	Evicted (Day 69)			
Diego	João	Roni	Aline	Princy	Bella	Amanda	Amanda	Vanessa	Aline	Tatiele	Angela	Clara	Angela	Evicted (Day 64)				
Aline	Diego	Amanda	Vanessa	Vanessa	Bella	Clara	Letícia	Letícia	Cássio	Head of Household	Angela	Marcelo	Evicted (Day 57)					
Franciele	João	Princy	Rodrigo	Vanessa	Vanessa	Cássio	Amanda	Vanessa	Tatiele	Roni	Clara	Evicted (Day 50)						
Roni	Diego	Letícia	Vanessa	Vanessa	Franciele	Vagner	Diego	Franciele	Angela	Angela	Evicted (Day 43)							
Letícia	Cássio	Princy	Aline	Princy	Head of Household	Diego	Aline	Franciele	Aline	Evicted (Day 36)								
Junior	Franciele	Amanda	Letícia	Vanessa	Franciele	Amanda	Amanda	Vanessa	Evicted (Day 29)									
Amanda	Diego	Princy	Princy	Franciele	Franciele	Cássio	Diego	Evicted (Day 22)										
Vagner	Clara	Roni	Marcelo	Tatiele	Junior	Angela	Evicted (Day 15)											
Bella	Franciele	Princy	Cássio	Franciele	Franciele	Evicted (Day 13)												
Princy	Vanessa	Amanda	Vanessa	Vanessa	Evicted (Day 10)													
Rodrigo	Clara	Amanda	Aline	Evicted (Day 8)														
Alisson	Diego	Roni	Evicted (Day 6)															
João	Diego	Evicted (Day 3)																
Notes	1, 2	3, 4	5, 6	7, 8	9, 10	11, 12, 13	14	15, 16, 17	18, 19, 20	21	(none)	22, 23	24	(none)	25, 26, 27	28, 29, 30	31	32
Nominated for Eviction	Diego; João; Valter	Alisson; Amanda; Princy	Aline; Angela; Rodrigo	Marcelo; Princy; Vanessa	Bella; Diego; Franciele	Cássio; Franciele; Vagner	Amanda; Marcelo; Vanessa	Aline; Junior; Vanessa	Cássio; Diego; Letícia	Diego; Roni	Angela; Franciele	Aline; Marcelo	Diego; Marcelo; Vanessa	Cássio; Marcelo	Marcelo; Tatiele	Clara; Valter	Marcelo; Vanessa	Angela; Clara; Vanessa
Evicted	João; 44% to evict	Alisson; 40% to evict	Rodrigo; 48% to evict	Princy; 64% to evict	Bella; 56% to evict	Vagner; 50% to evict	Amanda; 65% to evict	Junior; 68% to evict	Letícia; 54% to evict	Roni; 60% to evict	Franciele; 66% to evict	Aline; 80% to evict	Diego; 61% to evict	Cássio; 62% to evict	Tatiele; 54% to evict	Valter; 75% to evict	Marcelo; 55% to evict	Clara; 19% to win
Evicted	João; 44% to evict	Alisson; 40% to evict	Rodrigo; 48% to evict	Princy; 64% to evict	Bella; 56% to evict	Vagner; 50% to evict	Amanda; 65% to evict	Junior; 68% to evict	Letícia; 54% to evict	Roni; 60% to evict	Franciele; 66% to evict	Aline; 80% to evict	Diego; 61% to evict	Cássio; 62% to evict	Tatiele; 54% to evict	Valter; 75% to evict	Marcelo; 55% to evict	Angela; 28% to win
Survived	Diego; Fewest votes to evict	Amanda; Fewest votes to evict	Aline; Fewest votes to evict	Marcelo; Fewest votes to evict	Diego; Fewest vote to evict	Cássio; Fewest votes to evict	Marcelo; Fewest votes to evict	Aline; Fewest votes to evict	Cássio; Fewest votes to evict	Diego; 40% to evict	Angela; 34% to evict	Marcelo; 20% to evict	Marcelo; Fewest votes to evict	Marcelo; 38% to evict	Marcelo; 46% to evict	Clara; 25% to evict	Vanessa; 45% to evict	Vanessa; 53% to win
Survived	Valter; Fewest votes to evict	Princy; Fewest votes to evict	Angela; Fewest votes to evict	Vanessa; Fewest votes to evict	Franciele; Fewest votes to evict	Franciele; Fewest votes to evict	Vanessa; Fewest votes to evict	Vanessa; Fewest votes to evict	Diego; Fewest votes to evict	Diego; 40% to evict	Angela; 34% to evict	Marcelo; 20% to evict	Vanessa; Fewest votes to evict	Marcelo; 38% to evict	Marcelo; 46% to evict	Clara; 25% to evict	Vanessa; 45% to evict	Vanessa; 53% to win

=== Notes ===
- ^Note 1 : On day 1, housemates competed in the first HoH competition. The housemates were divided into two teams. Amanda won it and her team (Purple) also won immunity for the first nominations.
- ^Note 2 : At this nominations each group should nominate a housemate from Orange team. First, the Orange team nominated face to face one of them. The most voted was João, with 4 votes. Then, the Purple team nominated a member of Orange team in Diary Room. There was a tie vote between Clara and Diego, with 3 votes each. Amanda decided to nominate Diego.
- ^Note 3 : On day 4, housemates competed in the second HoH competition. The housemates were again divided into two teams with Leticia and Tatiele switching teams. Valter won it and his team (Orange) also won immunity for the second nominations.
- ^Note 4 : Like last nominations, each team should nominate a housemate. First, the Purple team nominated face to face one of them. Amanda received 4 votes, Princy received 3 votes and Letícia, Rodrigo and Roni received 1 vote each, so Amanda was nominated. Then, the immune team (Orange) nominated a member of the Purple team in the Diary Room. Princy received 4 votes, Roni received 3 votes and Marcelo received 1 vote, so Princy was also nominated.
- ^Note 5 : On day 6, housemates competed in the third HoH competition. Leticia and Tatiele switched back to their original teams. Tatiele won it, but this time, she had to choose only four housemates from her team (Purple) to win immunity. She chose Amanda, Bella, Junior and Roni.
- ^Note 6 : The two housemates who received the most nominations would face eviction. Aline received the most votes with 5, while Rodrigo and Vanessa tied with 3 votes each. Head of Household Tatiele broke the tie and decided to nominate Rodrigo, so he and Aline joined Angela (HoH's choice) as this round's nominees.
- ^Note 7 : On day 8, housemates competed in the fourth HoH competition. Following Rodrigo's eviction and Tatiele being ineligible as current HoH, Angela switched over to the Purple team to even out the teams. Cássio won it, but like last time, he had to choose only four housemates from his team (Orange) to win immunity. He chose Diego, Letícia, Vagner and Valter.
- ^Note 8 : The two housemates who received the most nominations overall would face eviction. Vanessa received the most votes with 5, followed by Princy who received 4. Both joined Marcelo (HoH's choice) as this round's nominees.
- ^Note 9 : For winning the HoH challenge, Letícia have guaranteed immunity for next round's eviction.
- ^Note 10 : The two housemates who received the most nominations overall would face eviction. Franciele received the most votes with 8, followed by Bella who received 2. Both joined Diego (HoH's choice) as this round's nominees.
- ^Note 11 : For being the Purple team Recycler (the winner team of the sixth HoH competition), Marcelo had the right to choose the next HoH. He chose Roni.
- ^Note 12 : The two housemates who received the most nominations overall would face eviction. Cássio received the most votes with 3, while Amanda, Diego and Vagner tied with 2 votes each. Head of Household Roni broke the tie and decided to nominate Vagner, so he and Cássio joined Franciele (HoH's choice) as this round's nominees.
- ^Note 13 : As HoH, Roni can choose two housemates from another team to gain an extra immunity. He chose Marcelo and Tatiele.
- ^Note 14 : Vanessa answered the Big Phone and should put three bracelets in three different housemates. On Sunday, she decided to which of the three gave an extra immunity (Clara) and who she nominated automatically for eviction (Marcelo).
- ^Note 15 : Aline answered the Big Phone and was automatically nominated. She also had to put a black bracelet in the housemate that she would nominate on Sunday and keep both informations as secret until the live vote. She chose Letícia.
- ^Note 16 : Since her vote as part of the Big Phone twist, Aline was not required to vote in the Diary Room along with her fellow housemates, so Letícia already had 1 vote even before the nominations began. The same process would happen again the following week.
- ^Note 17 : Franciele and Vanessa tied with 5 votes each. Head of Household Marcelo broke the tie and decided to nominate Vanessa, so she joined Aline (Big Phone's victim) and Junior (HoH's choice) as this week's nominees.
- ^Note 18 : Diego answered the Big Phone and was automatically nominated. He also had to put a black bracelet in the housemate that he would nominate on Sunday and keep both informations as secret until the live vote. He chose Aline.
- ^Note 19 : Due to a production error, Diego accidentally heard the same message Aline heard the previous week therefore, he was instructed to go to the Diary Room to hear the correct message that was: put a yellow bracelet in the housemate he wants to give an extra immunity. He chose Franciele. However, Diego's vote in Aline was not voided.
- ^Note 20 : Aline and Cássio tied with 3 votes each. Head of Household Clara broke the tie and decided to nominate Cássio, so he joined Diego (Big Phone's victim) and Letícia (HoH's choice) as this week's nominees.
- ^Note 21 : Marcelo won a challenge on Sunday before the nominations and gained an extra immunity.
- ^Note 22 : On day 52, Pedro Bial revealed to the audience that the winner of the Power of Immunity competition, instead of give immunity to someone else, would win the immunity. Tatiele won the PoI on day 54, but the housemates were only informed about the twist during the live nominations on day 55.
- ^Note 23 : On Big Mother Brasil twist, the mothers could choose one housemate to gain an extra immunity. Angela, Clara and Marcelo tied with 2 votes each. Valter's aunt (Head of Household at time) had the casting vote and gave the immunity to Angela.
- ^Note 24 : Cássio answered the Big Phone and won the power to automatically nominate someone. He chose Vanessa.
- ^Note 25 : Week 10 was the last week to featured Have and Have-Nots competition of the season. From this point on, housemates status would be permanent until the end of their stay in the house.
- ^Note 26 : Week 10 featured the first double eviction of the season. Following the first eviction on day 69, the remaining housemates played a week's worth of game – including HoH and nominations with the second eviction of the week taking place two days later in another live show on day 71, which featured another round of nominations.
- ^Note 27 : Clara and Marcelo tied with 2 votes each. Head of Household Valter broke the tie and decided to nominate Marcelo, so he joined Tatiele (HoH's choice) as this round's nominees.
- ^Note 28 : Week 11 featured the second double eviction of the season. Following the first eviction on day 73, the remaining housemates participated in the first part of the final HoH competition, with parts two and three to be played the next two days, followed by nominations and the final eviction taking place on day 76.
- ^Note 29 : Week 11's first HoH competition was the last where the previous HoH (Valter) was ineligible to take part in. From this point on, all remaining housemates would be eligible to compete.
- ^Note 30 : Angela and Clara tied with 2 votes each. Head of Household Marcelo broke the tie and decided to nominate Clara, so she joined Valter (HoH's choice) as this round's nominees.
- ^Note 31 : Angela won the final Head of Household competition and nominated Vanessa for eviction. Since Clara and Marcelo's votes would cancel each other out, only Vanessa was eligible to nominate. She chose Marcelo to be the second nominee.
- ^Note 32 : For the final, the public will vote for the housemate they want to win Big Brother Brasil 14.

=== Have and Have-Nots ===
	Week 1	Week 2	Week 3	Week 4	Week 5	Week 6	Week 7	Week 8	Week 9	Week 10
Vanessa	Have-Not	Have	Have	Have-Not	Have-Not	Have	Have	Have-Not	Yes Team	Yes Team
Angela	Have-Not	Have-Not	Have-Not	Have	Have	Have-Not	Have-Not	Have	No Team	No Team
Clara	Have-Not	Have-Not	Have-Not	Have	Have	Have-Not	Have	Have-Not	Yes Team	Yes Team
Marcelo	Have	Have	Have	Have-Not	Have-Not	Have	Have	Have-Not	Yes Team	Yes Team
Valter	Have-Not	Have-Not	Have-Not	Have	Have	Have-Not	Have-Not	Have	No Team	No Team
Tatiele	Have	Have	Have	Have-Not	Have-Not	Have	Have	Have-Not	Yes Team	Yes Team
Cássio	Have-Not	Have-Not	Have-Not	Have	Have	Have-Not	Have-Not	Have	No Team	No Team
Diego	Have-Not	Have-Not	Have-Not	Have	Have	Have-Not	Have-Not	Have	No Team	
Aline	Have	Have	Have	Have-Not	Have-Not	Have	Have	Have-Not		
Franciele	Have-Not	Have-Not	Have-Not	Have	Have	Have-Not	Have-Not			
Roni	Have	Have	Have	Have-Not	Have-Not	Have				
Letícia	Have-Not	Have-Not	Have-Not	Have	Have-Not					
Junior	Have	Have	Have	Have-Not						
Amanda	Have	Have	Have							
Vagner	Have-Not	Have-Not								
Bella	Have									
Princy	Have									
Rodrigo	Have									

== Ratings and reception ==
=== Brazilian ratings ===
All numbers are in points and provided by IBOPE.

First air date	MON	TUE	WED	THU	FRI	SAT	SUN	Weekly average
01/14 to 01/19/2014	—	31	32	28	28	25	14	26
01/20 to 01/26/2014	31	25	29	25	25	25	14	25
01/27 to 02/02/2014	32	28	34	29	26	22	15	27
02/03 to 02/09/2014	26	22	27	22	23	21	12	22
02/10 to 02/16/2014	27	24	31	22	24	20	10	23
02/17 to 02/23/2014	25	20	29	21	25	20	12	22
02/24 to 03/02/2014	26	20	27	21	22	23	14	22
03/03 to 03/09/2014	24	21	26	21	23	21	14	21
03/10 to 03/16/2014	25	23	26	20	22	20	15	22
03/17 to 03/23/2014	26	24	28	22	23	22	12	22
03/24 to 03/30/2014	24	20	24	22	23	19	14	21
03/31 to 04/01/2014	24	24	—	—	—	—	—	24
01/14 to 04/01/2014	Season Average							23

- In 2014, each point represents 65.000 households in São Paulo.
