= Vanessa Mesquita =

Brazilian model, bodybuilder, activist and reality television personality

- Born: Vanessa Andréa Mesquita; April 1, 1986 (age 39); São Paulo, Brazil
- Occupation(s): Model, TV personality
- Television: Big Brother Brasil 14 (Winner)
- Height: 1.63 m (5 ft 4 in)

Vanessa Andréa Mesquita (born April 1, 1986) is a Brazilian model, bodybuilder, activist and reality television personality best known for being the winner of the fourteenth season of the Brazilian version of the Big Brother, broadcast by Rede Globo in 2014. After the program, Mesquita made the cover of Playboy (Brazil)

== Personal life ==
Mesquita was born on April 1, 1986 in São Paulo. She lost her father as a child, 15 days before completing nine years. At various times in the Big Brother Brasil house, the model made it clear that, besides her (animal welfare) cause, she was there to make her mother, Mrs. Solange, proud. With the money game prize, she wants to return to study Veterinary Medicine, build a 24-hour clinic to care for dogs and cats for free and a site-shelter. The model is also an activist for animal rights, godmother of an NGO shields and participated in the removal of beagle breed dogs from the Royal Institute in São Roque in 2013.

== Big Brother ==
On January 7, 2014, Mesquita was announced as one of the twenty competitors of Big Brother Brasil.

In the Big Brother house, the first week starred with Clara's first kiss program. The two then formed the first gay couple in the overall reality. More than a showmance, the two have always been friends and companions. One was always next to the other. From start to finish, there was always mutual defense.

On the fourth nominations, Mesquita was one of the most voted by her fellow housemates and was put on the block, alongside Marcello Zagonel and Princy Cavalcante, who later was evicted with 68% of public vote. With strong attitude, she did not let go unchallenged the action of confinement she considered wrong. Also she did not let issues in the air. When she discovered that some of the other housemates had said something about her, she was to confront them. Because of that, she had arguments with Letícia Santiago and Franciele Almeida and fought with Cássio Lannes, who become her biggest rival in the game for some weeks.

Despite having a good performance in the competitions, Mesquita became Head of Household only once in the season, causing the eviction of Cássio, in a move which put Marcelo, with the help of Clara and Valter "Slim" Araújo, in order to eliminate one of them.

On April 1, 2014, after 78 days of confinement, she was announced by host Pedro Bial as the winner of the show, receiving 53% of the public vote, winning over the lawyer Angela Muñoz, who finished as runner-up and her close friend Clara Aguilar, who finished third.

== Trivia ==
- Mesquita is the third bisexual woman to win a Brazilian reality show chosen by the public. The first was Ellen Oléria from The Voice Brasil aired in 2012, also at Rede Globo, and the second one was Angelis Borges from Fazenda de Verão, which was exhibited at Rede Record from October 2012 to January 2013.
- She was declared the winner of Big Brother Brasil the same day of her 28th birthday.
- Is the first winner of Big Brother Brasil to merchandise a Furniture Brand - Alezzia Móveis
