= Andrew Leon =

Chinese-Australian businessman (1840?-1920)

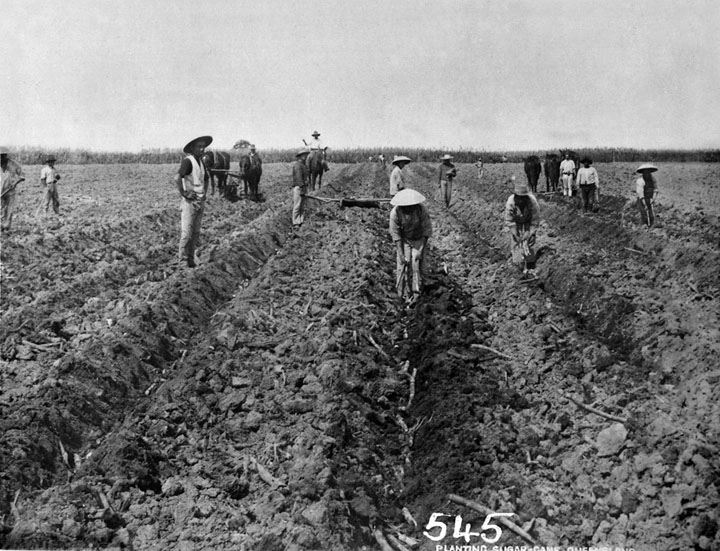
Chinese canegrowers in the Cairns area, late 1880s

Andrew Leon (circa 1841–1920) was a Chinese-born Australian businessman in northern Queensland, predominantly in the Cairns district. He established the Hap Wah plantation that pioneered the Cairns district sugarcane industry. He was the acknowledged leader of the Cairns Chinese community from the 1870s well into the 1890s.

== Early life ==
Leon, the son of a Cantonese merchant, came from Zhongshan, China. As a young man he gained agricultural experience in Cuba where sugar production was a major industry. He migrated to the Colony of Queensland where he settled in 1866. The earliest known evidence of Leon was in Bowen, where he was baptised in 1868 at St Mary's Roman Catholic Church before his marriage to Irish-born Mary Piggott in that church in February 1869. While in Bowen, he became a naturalised British subject in September 1869 which enabled him to own land in Queensland. At that time he had been in Queensland for three and a half years.

Over the next six years the Leon family moved from place to place following the discoveries of gold across North Queensland. Their four children were born in different towns: Elizabeth in Bowen, William in Townsville, Mary in Millchester, and Annie in Cooktown. In 1870 and 1871 he held miners rights on the Ravenswood goldfields and in 1874 he was in Millchester where he interpreted in court. By 1875 he moved his family to Cooktown, the new port and service centre for the Palmer goldfields. There he signed the petition for Cooktown to become a municipality, was employed by Sun Tung Lee and Co., and managed the Sun Yee Lee and Co. stores.

== Cairns business activities ==
1884 Cadastral map of Cairns, showing the Hap Wah plantation, selected by Andrew Leon. The selections were 6 and 15 (Portions 52 and 75) south of Chinaman Creek.

Leon was an early arrival in Cairns in 1876 where he managed Lee On’s large store and assisted Cooktown businessman Chuck Lum to establish the Sun Chong Lee store on Abbott Street. In February 1877, Lum purchased its allotment and Leon purchased an adjoining allotment. Both properties had buildings already constructed, the first Chinese-owned buildings in Cairns.

Two years later he commenced Hap Wah plantation (1878–1886) that pioneered the Cairns district sugarcane industry.

In 1878 and 1879 Leon selected 1,250 acres (510 ha) of agricultural land near Cairns. A group of Chinese traders in Hong Kong joined with local businessmen to form the Hap Wah Company and invested £45,000 in the venture to establish tropical agriculture. This was the first large scale sugar cultivation in Far North Queensland. Leon was the manager and only spokesman for the enterprise. The “Pioneer” sugar mill on the Hap Wah plantation was the first in the Cairns district. Its opening in 1882 was a large event attracting many stakeholders and official guests. The trial crushing was undertaken by early April before full production commenced in June. By the end of December 110 tons of Hap Wah sugar had been exported with a total value of £3,060.

The Hap Wah plantation and mill were located along Mulgrave Road (formerly Hap/Hop Wah Road). The plantation consisted of two parcels of land (known as Portions 52 and 75). Portion 52 was bounded to the north by Chinaman Creek with the following corner points:

- to the north-west 16.9429°S 145.7287°E
- to the south-west 16.9547°S 145.7275°E
- to the south-east 16.9560°S 145.7426°E
- to the north-east 16.9390°S 145.7443°E

In terms of current suburbs, it included the eastern part of Earlville, the north-western corner of Woree, and the north-eastern edge of Bayview Heights.

Portion 75 was bounded to the north by Portion 52 and extended south to Anderson Road with the following corner points:

- to the north-west 16.9547°S 145.7275°E (south-western corner of Portion 52)
- to the south-west 16.9661°S 145.7261°E
- to the south-east 16.9677°S 145.7463°E
- to the north-east 16.9542°S 145.7455°E
- and then west to connect to Portion 52 16.9538°S 145.7428°E

In terms of current suburbs, Portion 75 included the north-east part of Bayview Heights and the western part of Woree.

The plantation was at its peak in 1884 with 200 Chinese workers employed when world sugar prices fell by a third, depressing the emerging industry. Although the Hap Wah plantation produced at least as well as others of the period, it left the severely depressed industry in 1886. Swallow & Derham's Hambledon plantation had first crushed in 1883 and Loridan's Pyramid plantation in 1885 but none of the three had made a profit by 1889. Pyramid closed around 1890 while Hambledon continued for more than a century but broken up into small allotments. When the Hap Wah enterprise closed, the plantation land was sold to Charters Towers businessman Thomas Mills and the final standing crop to a group of Cairns businessmen. The sugar mill was sold to Noakes Bros of Bundaberg, dismantled and shipped in December 1887 to Bundaberg where it was re-erected. Despite the short life of the Hap Wah enterprise, its entrepreneurial investment and production were significant in the establishment of the Far North Queensland sugar industry.

Leon was an innovative agriculturalist and businessman. After the sale of Hap Wah plantation, he established orchards and sold timber from Maryvale Estate, his 1,280-acre (520 ha) property above the Barron River Valley. The growing agricultural industry in the Cairns region supported a large number of Chinese who were also involved in associated industries such as market gardening and shop keeping. In 1886 the Chinese population of the Cairns district accounted for 60% of all farmers and gardeners, and 90% of all farm labourers.

By 1886 Chinese migrants were nearly a third of the non-indigenous population of the rapidly-growing Cairns district, while in town one in five residents were Chinese. Sachs Street near the town centre became the focus of Chinese commerce and community including shop keepers and merchant houses, two temples, and boarding and gaming houses. Leon and James Ah Ching were among other Chinese investors who contributed to its development. Leon's early acquisitions provided the premises for Sam Sing and Co., Sun Wo Tiy, and Lee Yan Bros., the three largest and longest lasting Chinese merchant firms from the 1880s into the 1920s. His other properties included the Leon family home at 67 McLeod Street as well as a number of properties along the planned route of the Cairns-to-Herberton railway line. His holdings extended as far as Aramac. His last property acquisitions occurred during the 1893 depression.

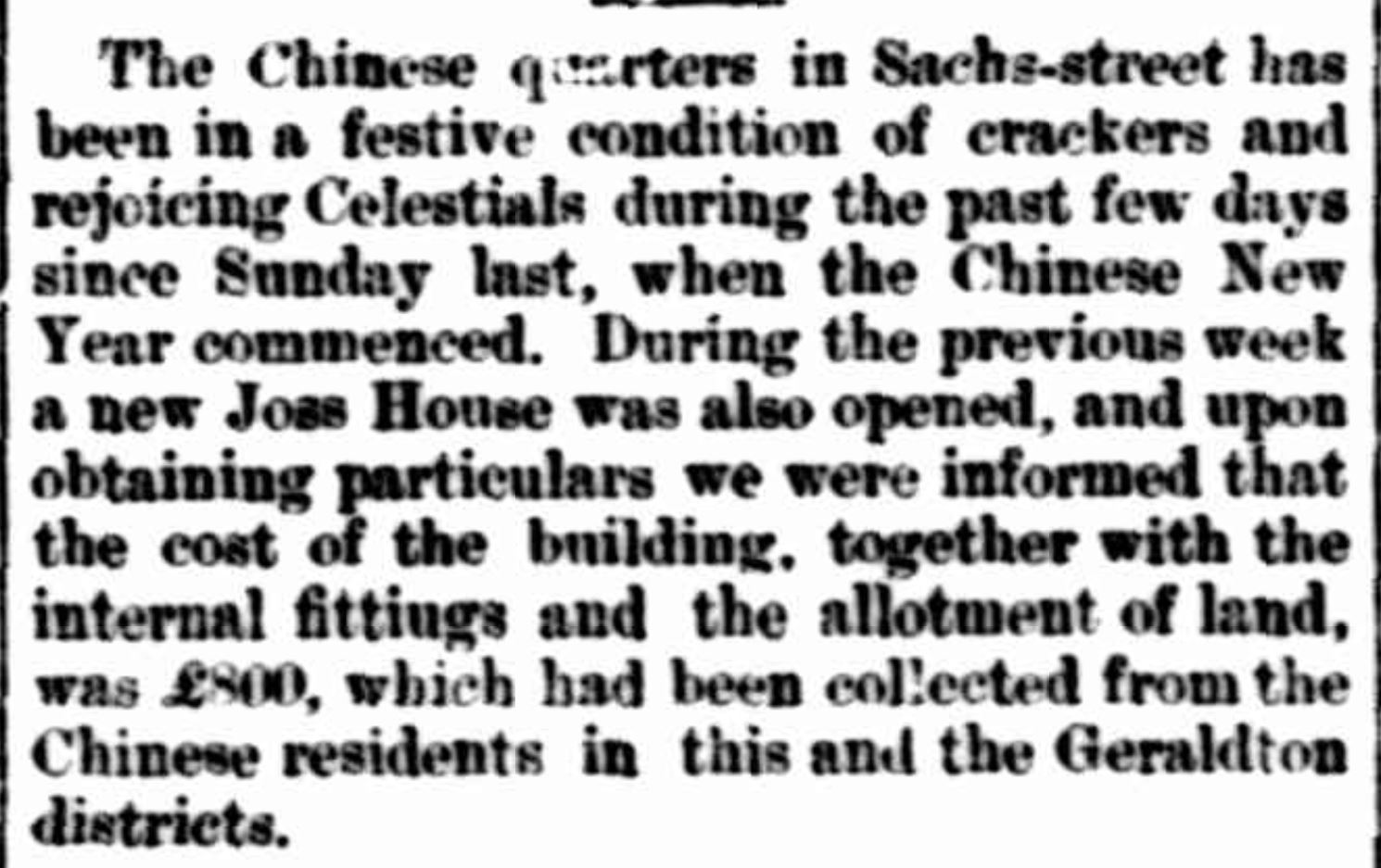
Newspaper report of the opening of the Lit Sung Goong temple

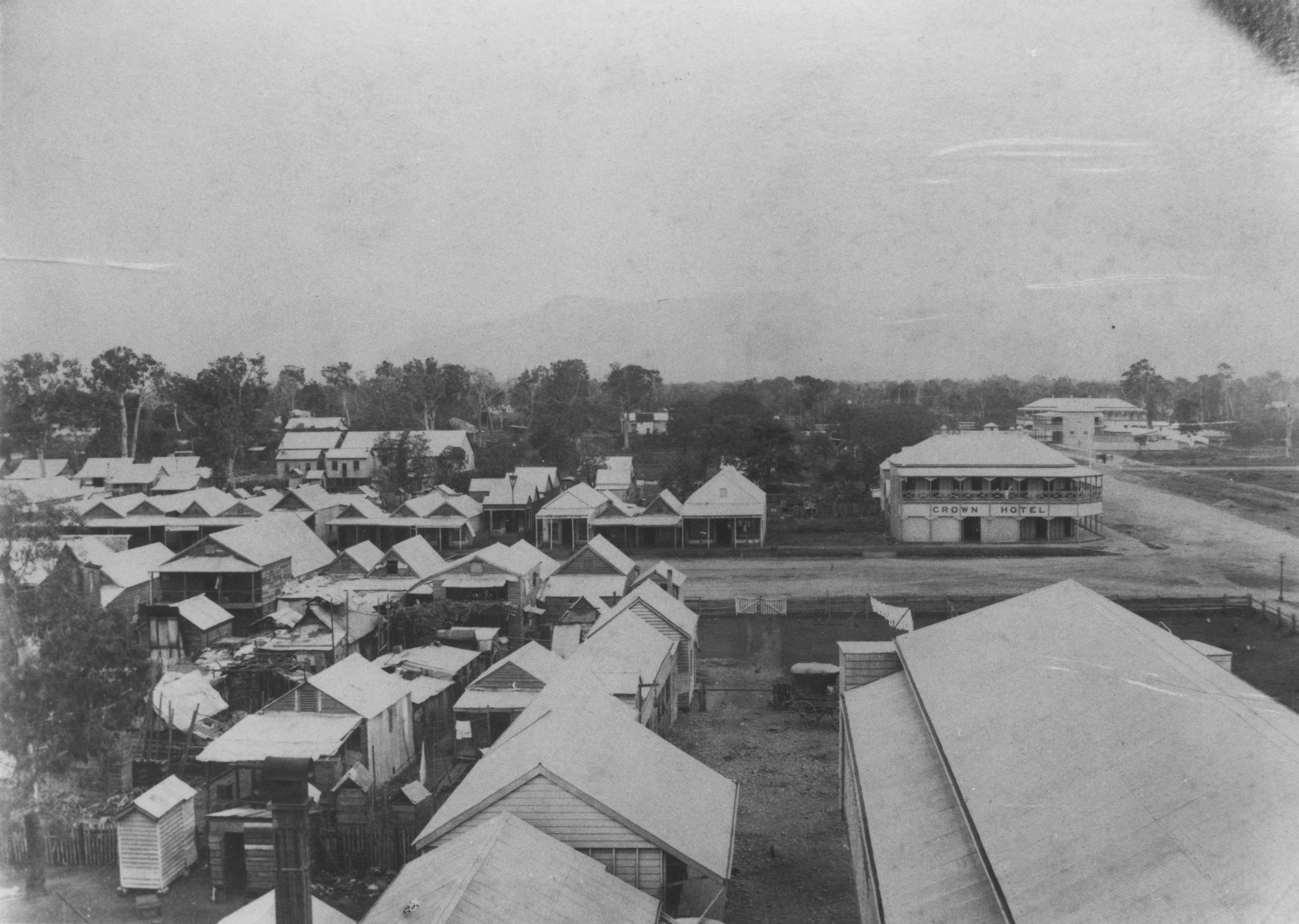
Chinatown Cairns in Sachs Street (now Grafton Street) showing the Lit Sung Goong Temple (no longer extant, centre of photo, flagpole in front) and the Crown Hotel (still exists, right of photo), circa 1890

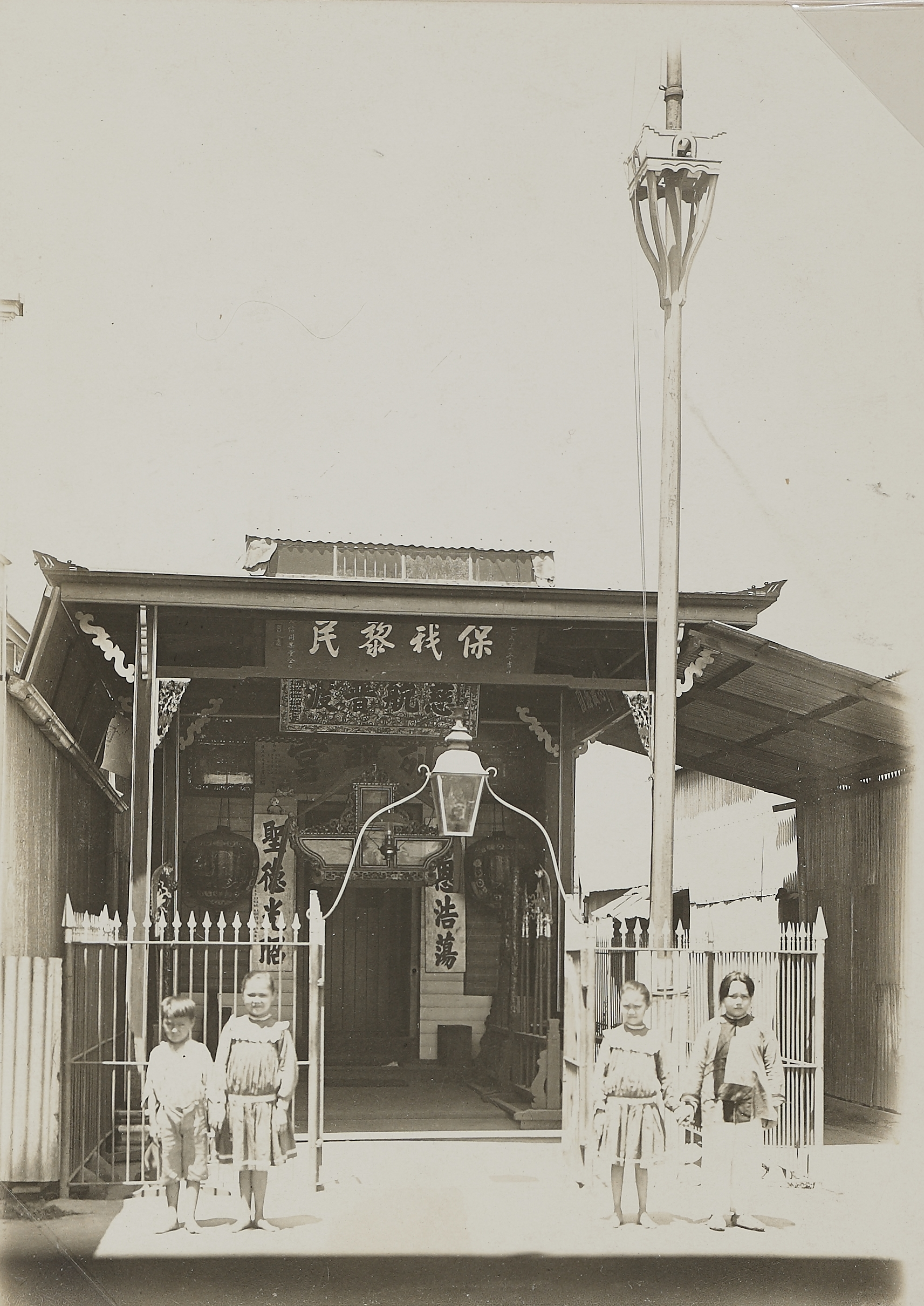
Lit Sung Goong temple, circa 1890

In late 1886 Leon purchased his third allotment in Sachs Street (now Grafton Street). The first building constructed was the Lit Sung Goong temple that opened during Chinese New Year 1887. Several years later four shops were erected and, today, the only one remaining is listed on the Queensland Heritage Register as 99 Grafton Street. A trust arrangement initiated by Leon in 1890 ensured that the temple property remained with the Cairns Chinese community; Leon and Jan Bung Chong were named as trustees. This trust protected the community's ownership. In 1966 economic pressures forced them to sell the temple land but the trust retained the contents of the temple. Consequently, the significant Lit Sung Goong collection of temple artefacts remains with the Chinese community under the care of the Cairns & District Chinese Association Inc (CADCAI). Leon made similar trust arrangements that assisted other Chinese to own property, using his status as a naturalised British subject to undertake land transactions not possible for the many Chinese residents who were not naturalised.

Court cases with Chinese participants required interpreters and Leon performed this role from at least 1874–1905 in Petty Sessions, Police Courts and, for perjury matters, the Northern Supreme Court in Townsville. His interpreting skills were also important to the Chinese community generally. For example, in the late 1890s the Cairns banana industry, dominated by Chinese growers and shippers, was plagued with fruit fly. Leon interpreted the many issues and concerns at a large meeting held at the Lit Sung Goong temple.

Chinese migrants were an integral part of the early Cairns district economy and played an important role in its development. Leon provided an essential link between the Chinese and wider community. His experience in business management, agriculture and property investment as well as his fluency in the English language, Westernised dress and manners earned him a respected position of leadership in the Chinese and wider communities.

Government dignitaries who visited Cairns were greeted by town officials, prominent citizens and, invariably, Chinese delegations. In 1881 Leon would have been the "Celestial" representative who presented the Queensland Governor Sir Arthur Kennedy with the Chinese address of welcome and expression of their loyalty. During Queensland Governor Sir Henry Wylie Norman's visit in 1890, Leon presented the Chinese address that affirmed the Governor's "uniform kindness" to the Chinese in the Colony of Queensland. It acknowledged that the Governor's short visit would prevent him from seeing the "agricultural and other industries of our countrymen" but trusted he would credit their "tribute, though small, to the advancement of the district we have adopted as our home…".

== Later life ==
As owner of Maryvale Estate in the Barron Division, Leon was involved with local government issues as well as with the property itself into the 1900s. In court, his reputation for reliability led to his selection as interpreter where major offences such as murder were involved. He remained a trustee of Lit Sung Goong temple until his death. During the years 1900–1906 the two Leon daughters who lived to adulthood married Irish-Catholic husbands in Cairns and each family had three children. One of the four Leon grandsons, Jack Cleary, became a well-known and respected musician in Innisfail and Cairns.

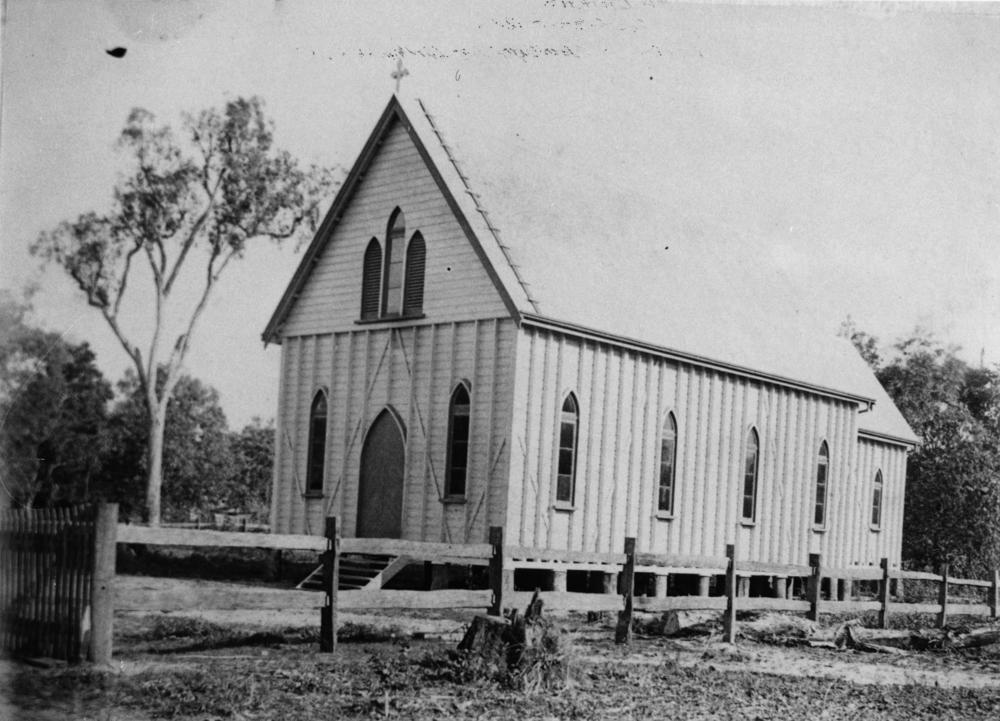
St Monica's Catholic Church

In 1901 the former colonies were united as the Commonwealth of Australia. The new Commonwealth immediately enacted its White Australia policy through the Immigration Restriction Act No. 17 of 1901 designed to exclude all non-Europeans from migrating or returning to the country. It had an immediate and severe impact on Chinese and others considered to be "aliens". It proved devastating to the Leon family. William Andrew Leon, the only son, had been sent to China for education in 1878. His intended return in 1899 was delayed by illness until 1903 and by that time the Immigration Restriction Act was firmly enforced. William was a Townsville-born British subject but he was considered an alien. Therefore, on re-entering, he would be subject to a dictation test: to write a 50-word passage dictated in any European language an immigration officer chose. Knowing this, Leon sought advice from Robert Taylor Hartley, Sub-Collector of Customs in Townsville. Hartley wrote to the Brisbane Collector of Customs and included William's Queensland birth certificate with his own 1899 endorsement that William be allowed to return. He also stated that he had known Andrew Leon for 25 years and was certain that he would not introduce any person other than William. A week later Atlee Hunt, Secretary of the Commonwealth of Australia, Department of External Affairs, replied that re-admittance was conditional on the dictation test. No evidence can be found that William ever returned to his family in Cairns.

Although many Chinese immigrants returned to China to retire, Leon remained in Cairns. On 27 June 1920 he died at his home in McLeod Street, Cairns, from cancer at age 80. His funeral was held at St Monica's Roman Catholic Church (the predecessor of St Monica's Old Cathedral) in Cairns, then the cortege progressed to the Martyn Street cemetery where he was buried.

== Legacy ==
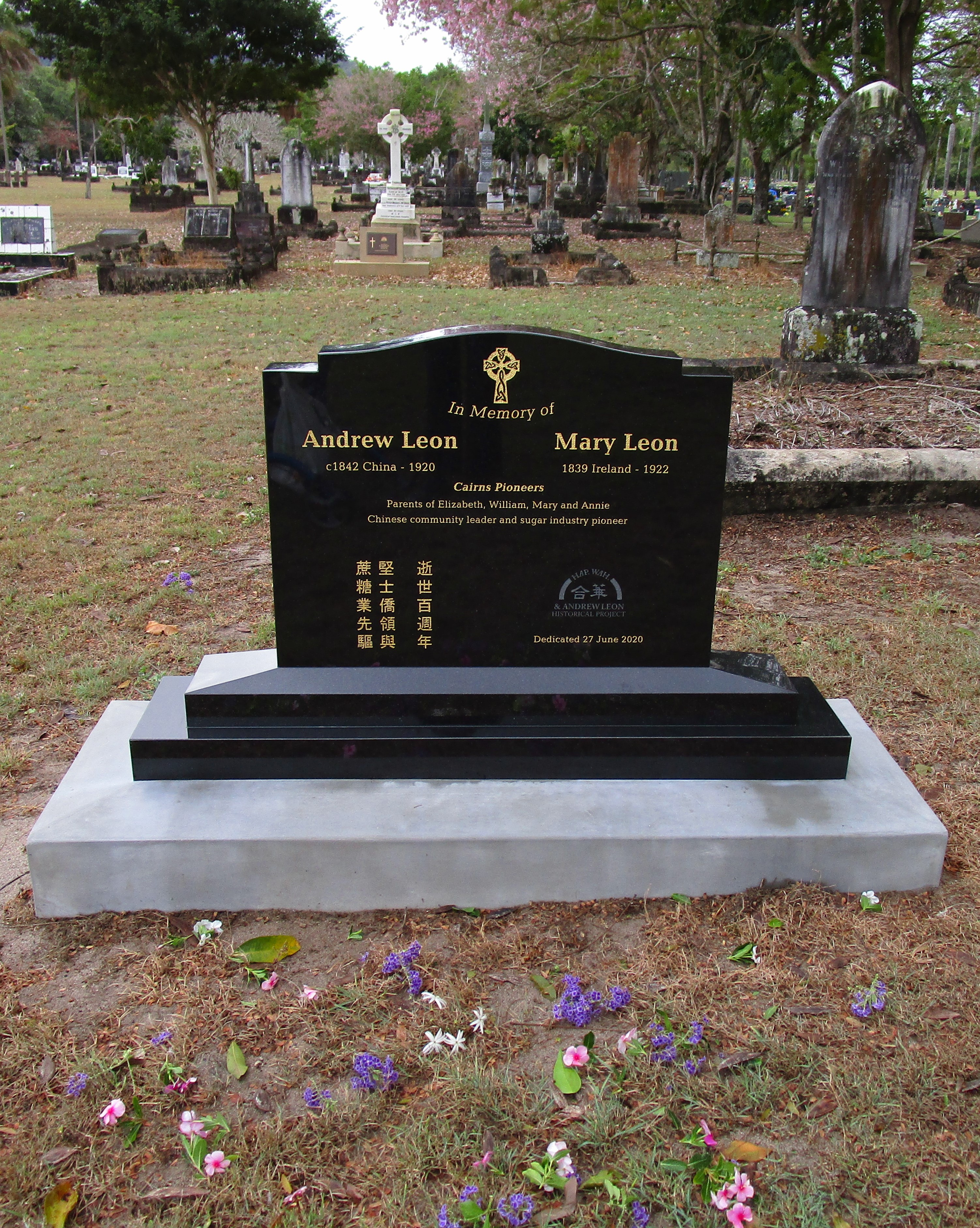
Andrew and Mary Leon Memorial Headstone, Martyn Street Cemetery, Cairns, 2020. The Chinese writing translates as "Centenary anniversary of death, Cairns Chinese community leader and cane sugar industry pioneer"

A plaque commemorating the Hap Wah enterprise was unveiled on 24 January 2013 at the Stockland Cairns shopping centre in Earlville, which was built on part of the former Hap Wah plantation. The plaque records the contributions of the pioneering Hap Wah venture, its manager Andrew Leon, and the "Chinese inspiration, businesses and agricultural enterprise that were crucial to the development and economic viability of early Cairns".

On 27 June 2020, the 100th anniversary of Leon's death, a memorial headstone was placed on the previously unmarked gravesite of pioneers Leon and his wife Mary who died on 21 June 1922.

Cairns Regional Council named Leon Close in Brinsmead after Andrew Leon.

Cairns Historical Society holds two collections concerning Leon:

- the Hap Wah & Andrew Leon Collection of new research and resources
- the Leon-Cleary Collection, Father Michael Bonner Estate, 2017

The latter includes over 200 family photographs from about the 1920s, and miscellaneous memorabilia. Both collections may be viewed by the public at the Cairns Historical Society Research Centre within the Cairns Museum. Despite extensive research, Leon's Chinese name remains unconfirmed and, despite his widely acknowledged leadership, no photographs of him or his wife have been found.
