= Michael 'Tarzan' Fomenko =

Georgian-born Australian hermit

Michael Fomenko
- Born: c.1927-1930 Georgian Soviet Socialist Republic
- Died: 17 August 2018 (aged 88); Babinda, Queensland, Australia
- Education: Shore School, Sydney
- Known for: Ocean rowing, Alternative lifestyle
- Relatives: Daniel Fomenko (father) (d. 1960); Princess Elizabeth Machabelli (mother) (d. 1988); Inessa Fomenko (sister); Nina Oom (sister) (d. 2008); Renee Maree (sister)

Michael 'Tarzan' Fomenko (c.1930 – 17 August 2018), was an eccentric, hermetic Australian bushman who spoke to few people and spent over five decades living mainly outdoors in the rainforests of Far North Queensland, Australia. Choosing to live his life in this manner, Fomenko became well known in the area, often spotted walking or jogging at the side of the Bruce Highway to the nearest town for supplies, usually bare chested, whilst carrying his "trademark" potato sack of belongings slung over his shoulder. He was first dubbed 'Tarzan' by children he befriended whilst in the Torres Strait on a solo canoeing expedition in his 20s. He became more widely known as 'Tarzan' from the late 1950s onwards, when a number of Australian newspapers referred to him as such in their coverage of his unconventional life.

For almost 60 years, from the mid-1950s until 2012, Fomenko roamed alone in Australia's northern wilderness, mainly in the sparsely populated area between the town of Ingham and Cape York in Queensland. Fomenko would sleep under the arch of giant strangler fig tree roots, or up in the trees to avoid creatures. Although described by the Cairns Post as a "Cairns legend", few people knew Fomenko well, as he choose to share little of himself or his past with anyone except his sister Inessa, and even they were estranged for decades. Despite not knowing where her brother had been for years at a time, Inessa was content that he was all right, acknowledging to ABC News a couple of years before his death that "he had a lovely life, he lived in paradise."

When Fomenko died in 2018, the Cairns Post wrote that "an incredible piece of Queensland history has come to an end." The Sydney Morning Herald wrote that he "captured the imaginations of countless Australians, who made him into a living frontier legend." He is the subject of several books on his life, including Michael 'Tarzan' Fomenko: The Man Who Dared to Live His Own Exotic Dream in 2016, and The King of the Coral Sea: The Untold Story of an Australian Legend in 2022.

== Early life ==
Sources differ as to the year that Fomenko was born. Some sources state 1930, whereas ABC Radio notes that he was aged 86 in 2013, putting his birth year c.1927. According to ABC News, Fomenko and his sister Inessa were born in Russia (then the Soviet Union) in the 1920s, and were of aristocratic descent with their mother Princess Elizabeth Matchabelli having come from "a long line of Georgian nobility" and their father Daniel Fomenko being a Cossack. Despite the claims by some sources that Fomenko's mother had been a princess (or was a 'former' princess by the time Michael was born), author Peter Ryle discovered in the 2010s whilst researching for a book on Fomenko's life that this "supposed connection with Russian royalty" had been little more than a "family allegation" all along.

The Sydney Morning Herald notes that "Michael was born in Georgia, then part of the Soviet Union, to the former Princess Elizabeth Machabelli, a member of the pre-revolution aristocracy, and one-time champion athlete Daniel Fomenko, a university lecturer."

The October Revolution, aka Bolshevik Revolution (part of the Russian Civil War), was already a decade old by the time Michael was born, and their parents' social status reportedly caused issues for the family in the political environment.

Living in Georgia, the impact of the October Revolution took time to reach the family, but by the late 1920s "things had taken a frightening turn" according to ABC News, who interviewed Inessa about the era in 2016:

"There (sic) were killing their own people, a kind of cultural genocide. Father was worried that mother would be killed as well," says Inessa. "Plus, we were starving. Michael's ribs stuck out and I used to faint from lack of food. Father would hold me up by the ankles so the blood would go back to my head. Father wanted to escape, somewhere or other. He was just so worried."

Inessa recalled that as a child, Michael was "petrified of thunder and lightning", but he would choose to go outside in it, or open the window and stick his head out, in a conscious effort to embrace the fear.

=== Escape from the Soviet Union ===
According to ABC News, when Michael was two-years-old, and Inessa five, the family fled on the Trans-Siberian Railway across the Soviet Union to the city of Vladivostok in the east, near Japan, using forged identification papers and wearing disguises. From there, the family paid Chinese bandits to "smuggle them across the border into Manchuria", bartering whatever items of value they had left, including jewellery which had been sewn into Inessa's toy dog for safekeeping. According to the Sydney Morning Herald, the family carried out this escape in the late 1930s.

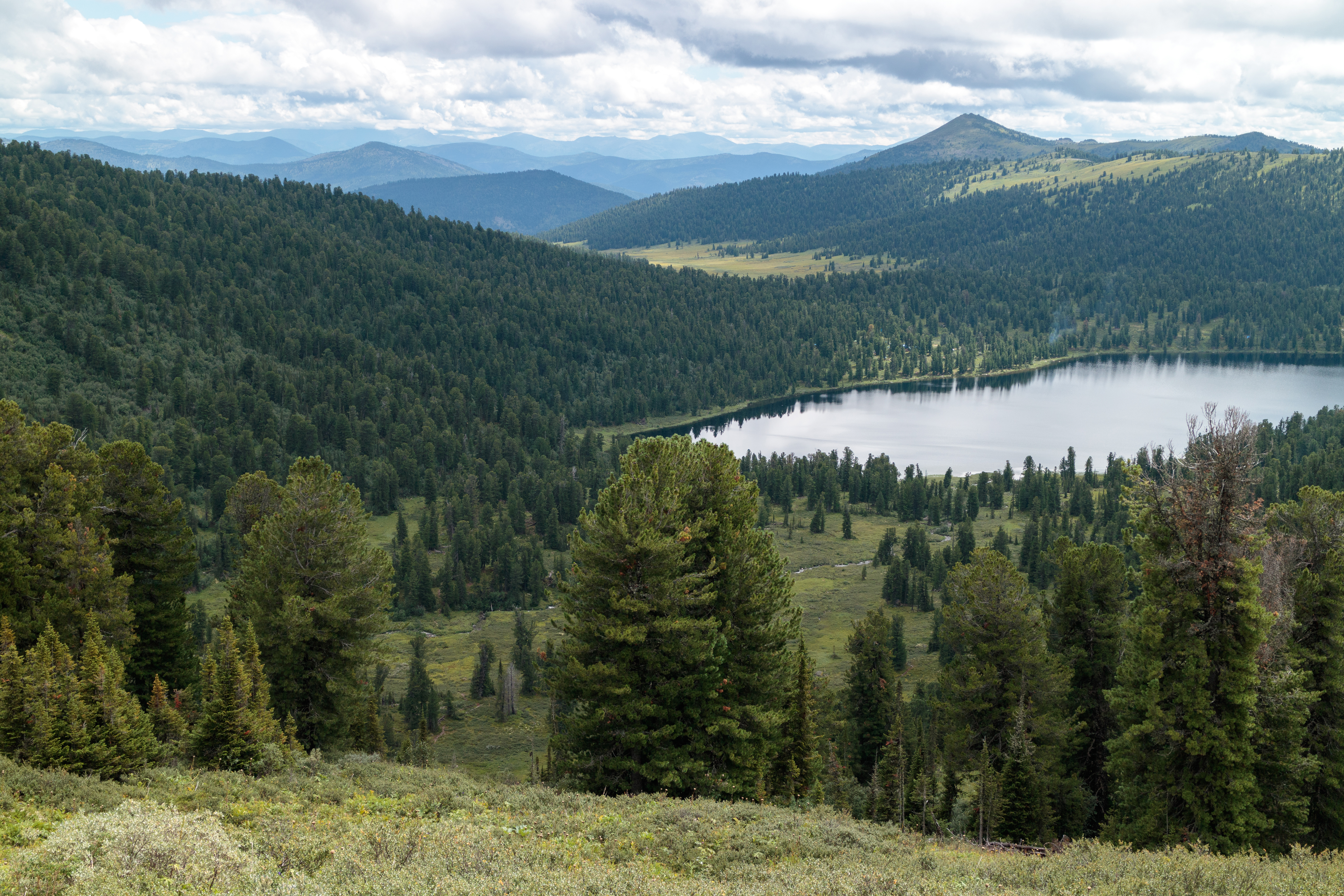
Dark coniferous Taiga forest near the Sayan Mountains in Siberia

Through the expanse of the Siberian Taiga pine forest, the family travelled by foot for a month, walking at night to avoid detection, hiding during the day, and surviving off very little food. Inessa recalls "We didn't know where we were going. The Taiga is huge — snow tiger country, you know. We relied totally on these bandits. I don't know how we made it, but we did."

The family settled in China for "a few years", before relocating to Japan and the relative safety it afforded, living in the countryside around the city of Kobe, where the children found themselves "immersed in nature." By the late 1930s, Daniel Fomenko's impression of Japan as a safe country was threatened by the looming threat of war (See: Japan during World War II), and the family moved once again, this time to Sydney, Australia, in 1941.

=== Move to Australia ===
Daniel Fomenko found work as a lecturer at the prestigious Sydney Church of England Grammar School, where Michael also began attending as a student. Daniel, apart from becoming one of the school's "most popular masters", was also engaged as a wartime radio commentator at this time. According to the Sydney Morning Herald, Michael, "alienated by language difficulties and his refugee ordeals," felt like an outsider at the school and, according to his father, began "to see himself" as a character from Homer's Odyssey, the Greek epic of endurance and alienation. Speaking before his death in September 1960, Daniel Fomenko said "I understand Michael's quest [because] his background and experiences epitomise a great tragedy of modern life."

Inessa confirms that Michael struggled socially during this time and found it hard to fit in, which she attributed in part to the turbulent experiences of their early years:

"Because we couldn't communicate our experiences as children, we were very much alone. The experiences we've had, nobody in Australia could begin to understand if we told them. There was danger, oh God, what we went through. Even though you might think he was too young, the past and all that drama really did have an effect on Michael. I think that's what got Michael into the forest, the background of our life."

On 3 December 1950, Fomenko's photograph appeared in the Sydney newspaper Truth, having competed the day prior at a shot put event at the Henson Park sports ground in the suburb of Marrickville. Michael was a natural athlete, according to ABC News, and excelled in the decathlon, "even being tipped" for the Melbourne 1956 Olympics at one point.

According to Robert Louis DeMayo, author of the 2022 historical fiction novel The King of the Coral Sea, Fomenko was "shut out" of the Commonwealth Games when he was twenty years old, however, for "financial and political reasons", an incident which led him to "question everything."

Decades later, in the 2010s, while trying to reconnect with her brother, Inessa painted him a pictured entitled "Corina, Corina", after one of his favourite songs from the 1950s. Inessa explained "I painted it to cheer him up, I thought it would remind him of those days in Sydney when we used to have sing-songs around the piano."

== Canecutting in northern Queensland ==
Upon leaving school in the mid-1950s, Fomenko took a job as a cane cutter in northern Queensland near Cairns. According to ABC News, this is when he "fell in love with the rainforest. He had found the place and the mode of living he felt most comfortable with." His decision to relocate to the jungles of Queensland was likened by the Sydney Morning Herald to the actions of the wanderer, warrior and athlete Odysseus from Homer's Odyssey.

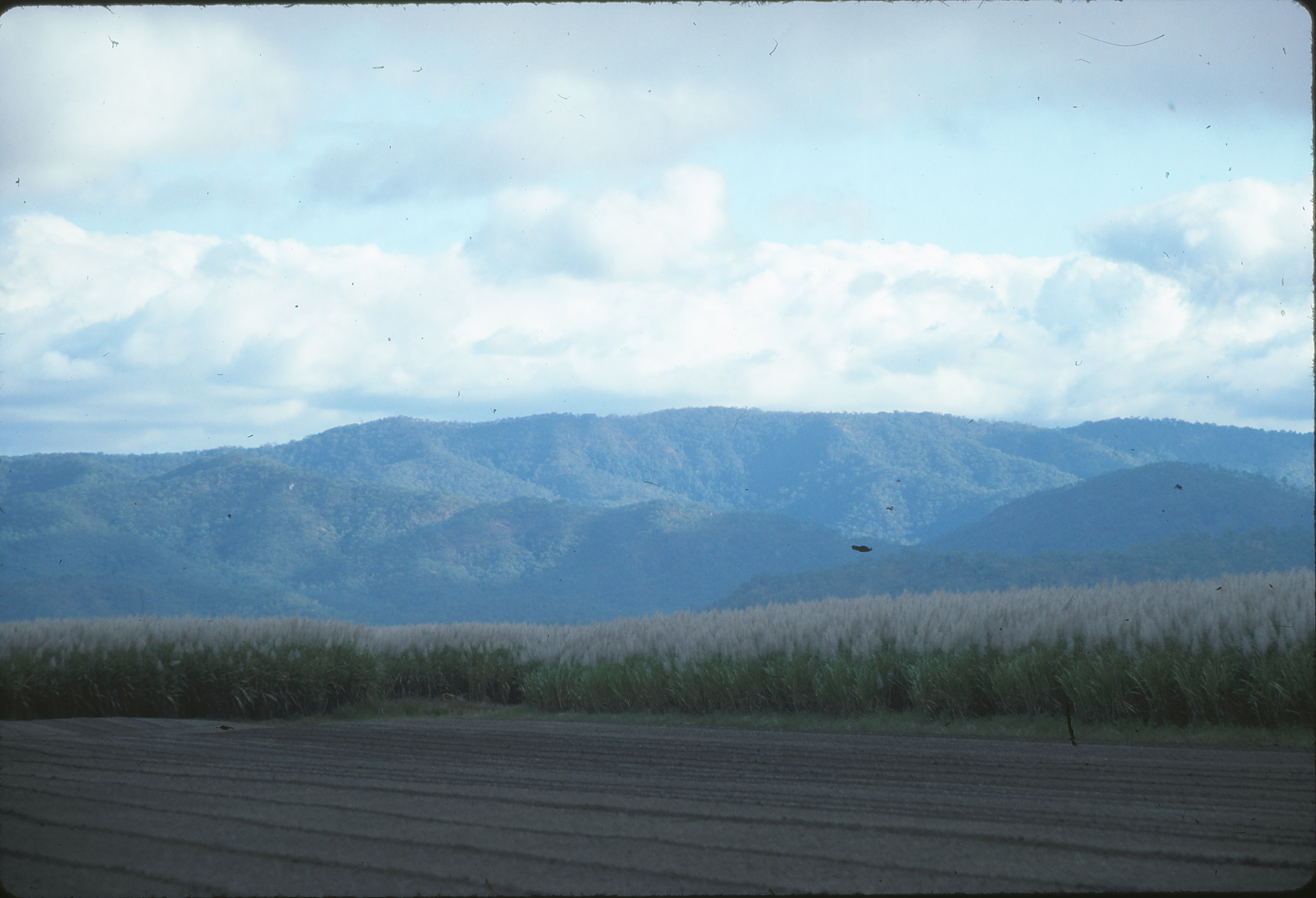
Cane fields and the Paluma Range of Queensland between Ingham and Townsville as seen from the Bruce Highway in July 1984

Periodically, Fomenko would return to the family's suburban Northbridge home in Sydney before he decided to finally quit the city permanently "and lost himself in the wilds of Cape York to worship what he called the 'nature god'". Fomenko would make Northern Queensland his home for the rest of his life, with some brief visits away.

According to the Sydney Morning Herald, there Fomenko "lived among Aborigines, killed crocodiles and wild boar with a machete", "grew obsessed with building and sailing dugout canoes (and) vanished like a ghost at any sign of officialdom."

=== Initial forays into canoeing ===
In July 1956, The Central Queensland Herald reported that Fomenko had been the individual responsible for a "native outrigger canoe" which had been seen floating unmanned "outside Cairns harbour" some days prior. Fomenko, then 26 and described as a "bearded (..) district canecutter", had set out from the town of Deeral in the canoe on Wednesday 18 July 1956 bound for Cooktown, with a dinghy in tow. Fomenko said he had anchored his canoe on Monday night off the south side of Double Island after "having been sighted" by the Cairns Harbour Board dredge boat, Trinity Bay, and had rowed ashore (presumably to Double Island) in the dinghy, intending to return for the canoe. When he returned the next morning, the canoe had been carried off by a high tide, and Fomenko went to the police station in Mossman for help in finding it.

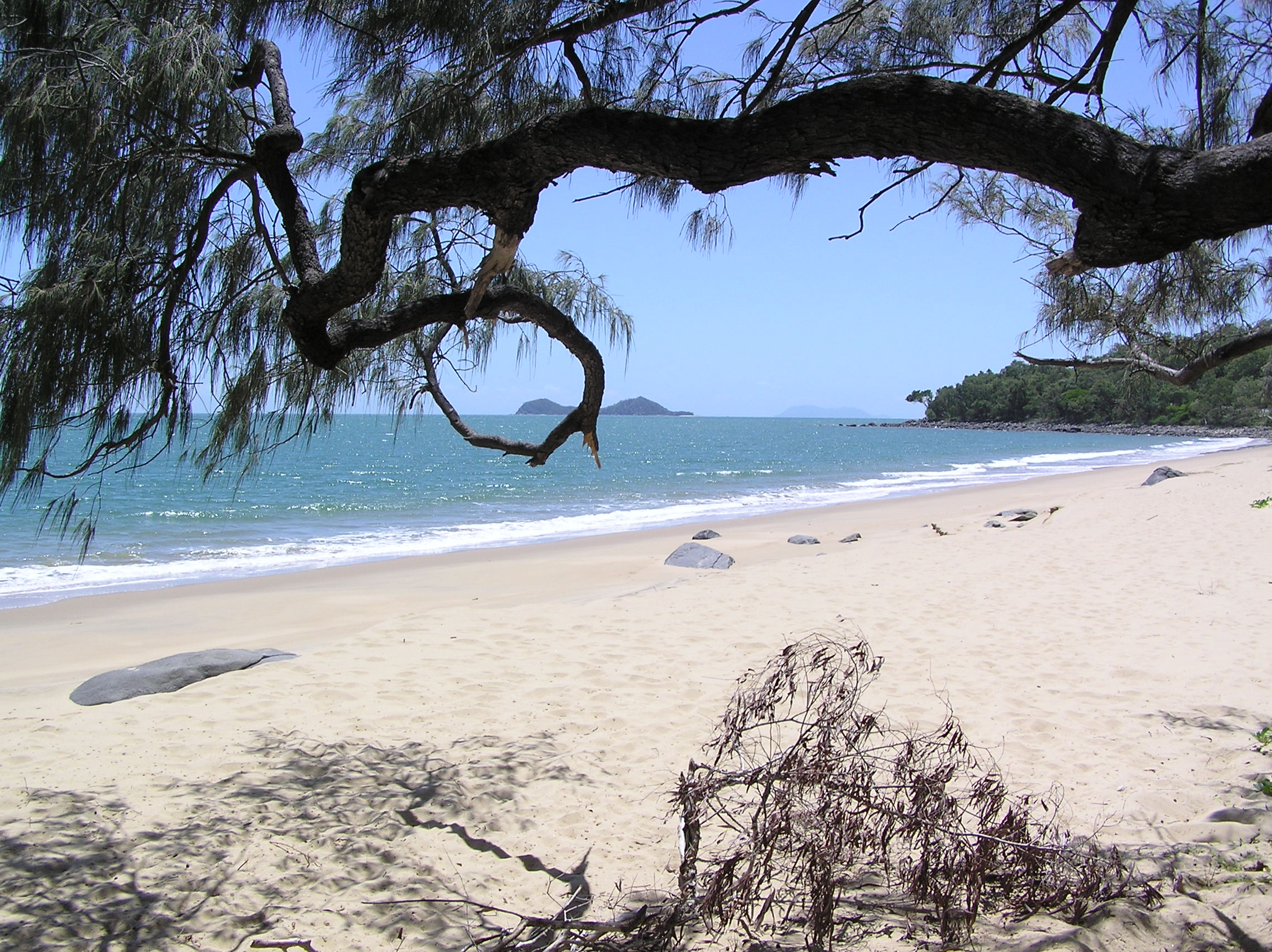
Looking out to Double Island, from the mainland Queensland coast in 2004

According to a 2011 article in the Sydney Morning Herald, Fomenko was "first dubbed 'Tarzan' by children he befriended in the Torres Strait." It is known that on 6 February 1959, the Toowoomba Chronicle and Darling Downs Gazette published an article about Fomenko entitled "'Tarzan' Once Attended Top Sydney School", and on the same day, the Bundaberg News Mail also published an article about him entitled "Father Tells of "Tarzan" Son".

== Journey to Dutch New Guinea ==
In March 1959, Fomenko reportedly landed by canoe at the Lockhart River Mission, near the tip of the Cape York Peninsula in Queensland, where he was "cared for by the missionaries and staff members" of the facility.

The Torres News of 17 March 1959 reported that Fomenko, then 27 (a "former Church of England school student and a son of the master of one of Sydney's most exclusive Church of England Grammar Schools") was "on his way" to Thursday Island in the Torres Strait:

He left (the Lockhart River Mission) a few days ago for T.I. and anticipates the journey will take three months. The bewhiskered "Tarzan" wears a lap lap of hassian, held up with a thick leather belt to which are attached two leather sheaths holding what appears to be daggers made from old cane knives. He has no other clothes, carries no food and there is no sail to his canoe, this appears to be a hollowed out tree trunk which he carved himself. His sole effects are a couple of drums of water and some spears. Several weeks ago he met the "Wewak" and the crew gave him sugar, rice and flour. The canoe, which is about 20ft long is fitted with an out-rigger made of rough hewn boughs. His father, who thinks Michael is leading a man's life, has asked that no publicity be given to his arrival on T.I. but the eyes of the south are focused on this man who is braving the elements in this life in the raw manner.

On 30 July 1959, The Canberra Times featured a brief update about Fomenko on its front page, reporting that he had then reached Horn Island, "only three miles east of Thursday Island." Fomenko was reportedly "living with about 100 natives in a settlement on the southern tip of the island" and planned within the coming days to visit Thursday Island to buy some supplies, before continuing on to New Guinea, which lay some 100 miles more across the Torres Strait.

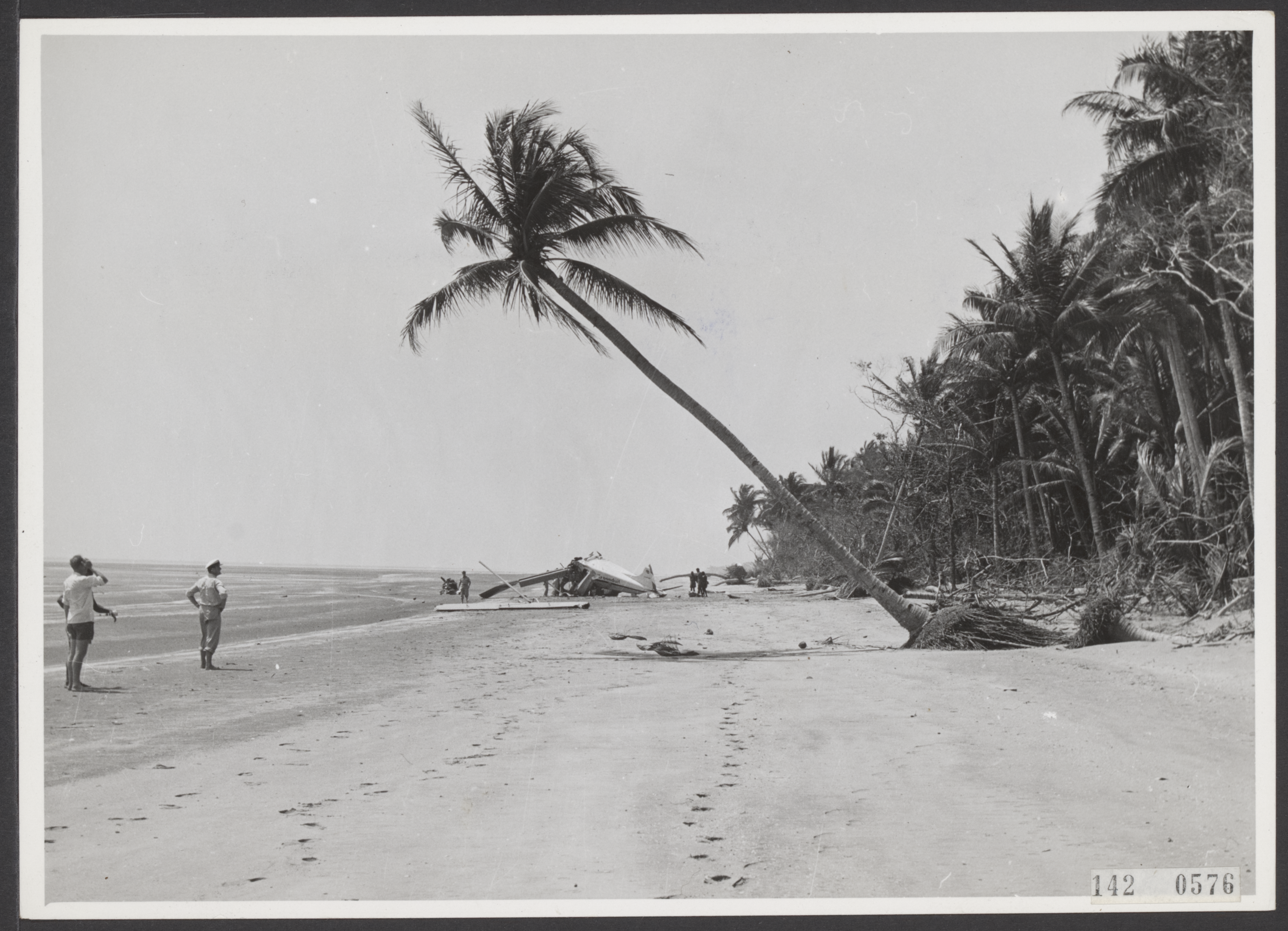
A beach near Merauke, then part of Dutch New Guinea, in 1957

By 8 December 1959, the Toowoomba Chronicle and Darling Downs Gazette reported that Fomenko had successfully reached New Guinea. He had paddled the canoe 126 miles across open sea, and having initially intended to reach the Solomon Islands, had been "blown off course by strong winds". The Canberra Times reported that on 11 December, Fomenko had been "washed ashore" at Tomerau, an area near the town of Merauke, then part of Dutch New Guinea, in a "native craft which was unseaworthy" and that he had "no money, passport or other papers." Dutch authorities in Sydney were advising that it would be "suicide" to allow Fomenko to leave the town in his canoe to attempt the 600 mile crossing to Australian New Guinea, as he was intending. A spokesperson for the Australian Department of Territories told the Canberra Times that it was "most unlikely" that Fomenko would even be granted permission to enter Australian New Guinea Territories anyway, as he would have to "conform to the usual requirements" to do so, and would be required to "hold a return ticket to Australia, have accommodation and employment or a bond to ensure that he would not become a charge on the Administration."

In mid-January 1960, 29-year-old Fomenko left the city of Jayapura (then known as Hollandia) suddenly, taking with him 12 pounds of sugar, and a number of empty bottles. He re-appeared in Hollandia in early February, apparently having spent the previous three weeks living in hills near the town. A spokesman reported that the Dutch authorities were arranging his repatriation to Australia, which occurred on 9 February 1960 via a KLM flight to Sydney:

"Tarzan" Fomenko – underweight and too weak to walk without assistance – was smuggled away from Sydney Airport when he returned from New Guinea to-night. Bushy-haired, stubble-faced and gaunt, and wearing only a khaki shirt and trousers with sandshoes, Michael Fomenko talked for almost an hour with his father, Mr. D. P. Fomenko, in the overseas terminal's customs room before leaving. He had not seen his father, a Sydney schoolteacher, since he left home three years ago to begin his canoe journey from Queensland to New Guinea (..) Mr. Fomenko Senior told the Pressmen last night, "Michael is not well. He is very tired after his trip and cannot speak to anyone to-night. It might take several days for him to recover, maybe longer. We are taking him home to bed."

== Return to North Queensland ==
Fomenko was treated for anaemia and malaria in Sydney. A week later he was spotted at Armidale railway station waiting for a train to go north once more, this time to the Great Barrier Reef, "to see the places and do some hunting and fishing." Fomenko, who had been recognised by a policeman at the train station, was described as wearing a "blazer, open-neck sports shirt and trousers and carrying only a small swag." He had told his mother he was going for a "short walk" when he left the family home earlier that day, and told his father he was going to Newcastle to visit friends. Upon being alerted about his sons whereabouts, Fomenko Senior told police he would wire his son some money.

ABC News notes that in 1960, Fomenko wrote "I have renounced what you call civilisation. I want the life I have been living, otherwise I will be only half alive", describing his home among nature as "my paradise of peace and personal endeavour".

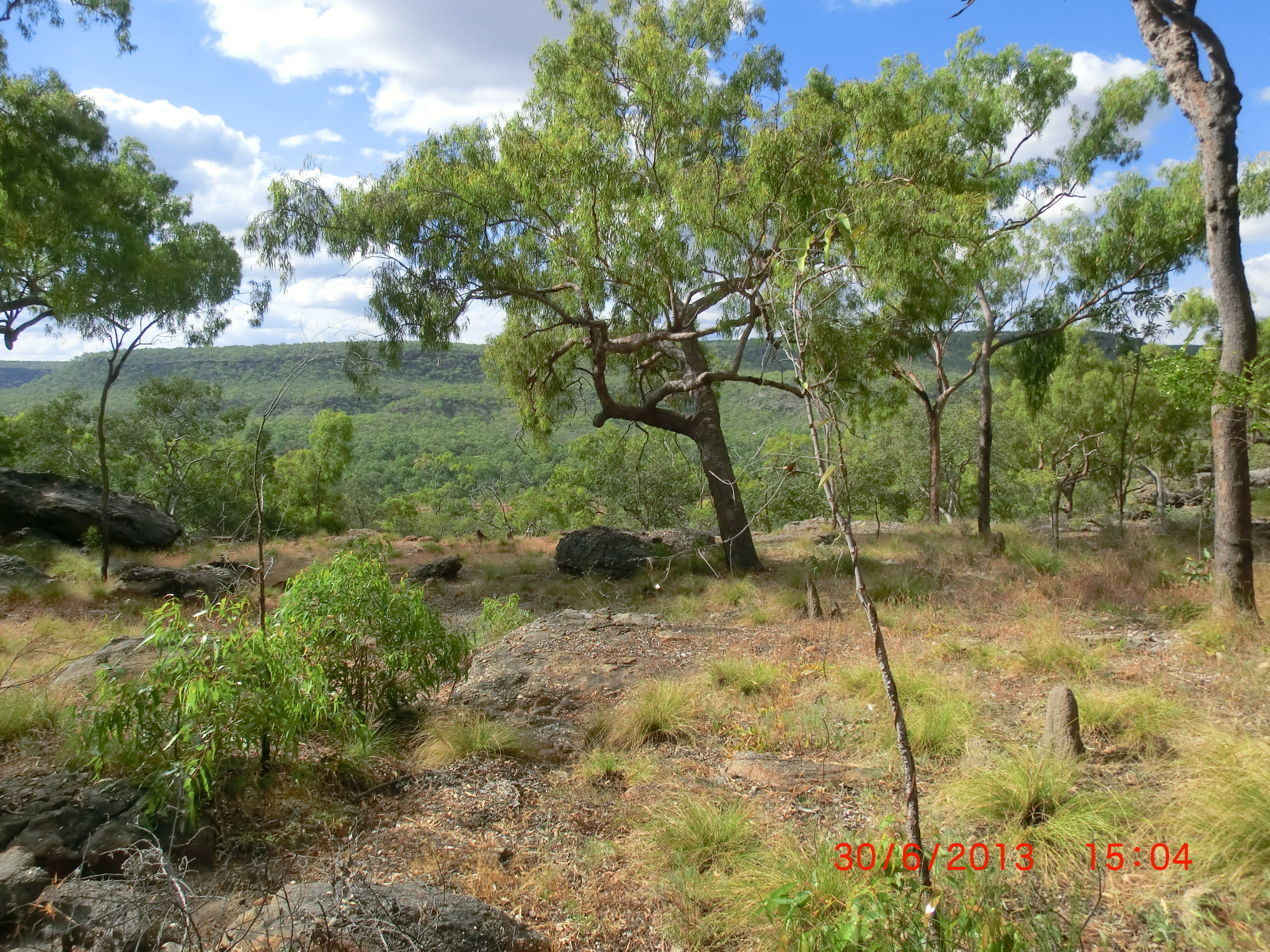
Landscape around Laura, Queensland in 2013

Fomenko's father Daniel was his "son's greatest supporter", according to the Sydney Morning Herald, and was the one responsible for "resisting his wife's pleas for Michael to be forcibly returned home from his adventuring." Following Daniel's death in late September 1960, Elizabeth Fomenko decided that her son needed help, and "set about having him committed."

By July 1961, Fomenko was living "somewhere near Timor" according to his sister Renee, interviewed in the magazine Pacific Islands Monthly. Renee, living in England at the time as a translator, planned to "eventually" write a book with her brother about his travels.

As of 1964, Fomenko was living in the area surrounding the town of Laura, inland of Cooktown, Queensland, and occupied himself in making another canoe. He was also in the habit of begging for food from the local cattle stations on occasion. Sam Elliott, a local prospector, recorded that:

He was a big burly bloke, full of goose eggs and rotten pig. He had to be about six foot, naked, and about sixteen stone. Some kids would wake up in the middle of the night screaming in fright... "Menko man! Menko man!"

== Incarceration and electric shock therapy ==
Fomenko was gored by a wild pig around this time, and in an attempt to heal himself, stole medicine and food from a cattle station. The police were called to put an end to Fomenko's stealing and vagrancy, and in early 1964 a team were assembled to track him down, with Sam Elliott joining. It took the team a "few days" to track him down, three days according to ABC News, before they eventually spotted him heading towards the scrub "like a wallaby." The team cuffed him from behind, and when Fomenko bit Elliott, he had to knock him out with the barrel of his "38", cutting a hole in Fomenko's head.

Once pacified, he was charged in Cooktown Police Court with behaving in an indecent manner (namely, wearing only the front section of a homemade lap-lap), vagrancy, stealing and resisting arrest. He pleaded guilty, and in April 1964 was examined by a psychiatrist in Townsville's Stuart Gaol. Queensland's Director of Psychiatric Services directed that Fomenko's six month prison sentence would be better served at Ipswich Special Mental Hospital (aka Sandy Gallop Mental Hospital), located in the Brisbane suburb of Ipswich.

Fomenko was eventually "declared insane" and incarcerated in a series of psychiatric institutions, the first of which being Sandy Gallop Mental Hospital, Brisbane, where he spent two years. Fomenko's mother was "very worried about him" and took him to a doctor at one point, who asked if her son was perhaps schizophrenic. Fomenko was later admitted to Callan Park Mental Hospital in Sydney, where he was given medication, sedated, and eventually electric-shock treatment, a process abhorred by his sister Inessa:

They gave him electric-shock treatment which absolutely, that's the thing that absolutely messed him up... that was it. It is the most horrific thing, it is so barbaric - it's going back to Middle Ages, to Dark Ages, you know? Because they don't cure anybody that way, they just stun them into death, you know? A sort of a, a spiritual death. And Michael hated it.

Barbara Dunne, a young nurse who worked in Callan Park Mental Hospital at the time, was interviewed in 2018 as part of the ABC radio documentary on Fomenko's life. She recalled seeing Fomenko, whose exploits as Tarzan she had already heard of at the time, who appeared as a "subdued, drugged-up fella sitting there in a shirt and a pair of trousers, watching the TV". Dunne noted that he looked like the "ghost of a person" by that stage, and was "basically a zombie."

"Mother insisted on Michael having psychiatric treatment because she never understood his [quest for adventure] (..) But I knew he wasn't insane, just different... and nothing they did to him in all the places she had him committed was of any benefit. It just made him more frightened, more of a recluse."

— Fomenko's sister Nina Oom (d. 2008), quoted posthumously in a 2015 Sydney Morning Herald article

The ABC radio documentary noted that Fomenko's medical records were still sealed as of time of airing in 2018, and it was not possible to know for how many years he was at Callan Park, but his family recall it as being years rather than months. His sister Inessa eventually took him out, but noted that he never trusted anybody again after that.

According to Nina Oom, one of Michael's three sisters, speaking in 1998:

The sad thing is, but for all that enforced 'treatment', Michael may well have returned and settled down by now. I think he was running away from a part of himself people couldn't understand, but there was another part of him that would have liked to be ordinary, with a lawnmower and a wife.

According to the ABC radio documentary, it took Fomenko "roughly a decade" after his release from Callan Park Mental Hospital to finally return to the place "he felt most at home" (i.e. Queensland). However, according to the Sydney Morning Herald, Fomenko returned to the jungles of Queensland upon his release from hospital in 1969.

From that point on, he returned to Sydney just twice more in his lifetime, once being for the funeral of his mother in 1988.

== 1980s ==
"What's Sydney like now? I do miss it. Yes. I miss dancing. Dancing and the parties. But I've been having such an adventurous time here... and I've travelled a lot, mostly in my canoe. And... and... I'm still very young!"

— Michael Fomenko speaking to Frank Robson in 1985

In 1985, Sydney Morning Herald journalist Frank Robson and photographer Arthur Mostead "chanced upon" Fomenko at one of his overnight bush camps near the entrance to the Bloomfield River, south of Cooktown, having been directed to him by an Aboriginal woman. When the two introduced themselves to him, he "rose from the dirt and shook hands formally. "My name's Mister Fomenko." Robson became one of the few journalists to interview Fomenko, who that evening "wore only shorts and his powerful, leathery frame was dark with ingrained grime." During the exchange, Fomenko shared Coca-Cola and chocolate bars with the men, which he had bought from a local store with his disability pension, and demonstrated an unfamiliarity with the goings on of the modern world:

With the dirt of the earth ingrained on his leathery skin and erratic tufts of hair about his ears and nose, the perfectly mannered recluse insisted he'd never heard the term 'nuclear war' and was shocked to learn that Johnny Weissmuller had died.

Robson recounts that Fomenko told the men "several times" how he missed his mother, who was by then in a nursing home, and how he "sent her shells and boar tusks to let her know he was well." Later that evening, Robson and Mostead invited Fomenko to a hippy party at a nearby property, but he declined, replying "I'd like to (..) But not tonight. I haven't got time." As the pair drove off, Fomenko called after them, thanking them for having visited him.

Soon after the encounter, Fomenko's sister Nina Oom travelled to the same area, hoping to meet her brother for the first time in a decade, and guided by Pearl Kendrick, a local shop owner from Ayton. They found him at a bay where he was "putting his latest dugout canoe through sea trials", and Oom ran to hug him, however he did not recognise her, and shrugged her off. Despite this, Oom stayed in the area longer, and a week later, when they saw him again, she wrote on a board "Michael – this is Nina, your sister. I'm staying with Pearl. Come in" and left it on the beach for him to find. Fomenko sent word for her to "come to the tree he was living under", and they "spent several days together before he abruptly disappeared." Oom died in 2008.

The Sydney Morning Herald reported that shortly before her death in 1988, Elizabeth Fomenko expressed remorse for having institutionalised her son, and confided in her daughter Nina that she had "been wrong to put him in hospital."

== 1990s ==
According to the Sydney Morning Herald journalist Frank Robson, around the year 1990, Fomenko relocated from Cape York to an area south of Cairns, where he had first lived in the 1950s after coming north to work as a cane-cutter. Local residents became used to the sight of him "loping effortlessly" along the Bruce Highway between Babinda and Cairns on supply trips, with his distinguishable sugar bag over his shoulder. Robson notes that "as time wore on the lope became a trot, then a shuffle."

Then aged in his 60s, Fomenko began spending the worst parts of the wet seasons indoors in empty buildings or budget hotels, but would return to the jungle in the less humid weather of the tropic winter.

== 2010s ==
By 2010, Fomenko was 80 years old, and still living outdoors for much of the year.

In early 2011, Robson travelled to north Queensland again and spent several days searching for Fomenko, who, less than 48-hours previously had been seen eating a Chinese takeaway in Cairns. He had also been seen at his bank a few days before that, "where staff complimented him on his smart new shirt."

Robson undertook the search accompanied by 44-year-old local courier driver Harold Jung, described as "perhaps the most avid of Fomenko's devotees" who had spent "much of the past decade" photographing Fomenko and researching his life. In searching for Fomenko across the sugar cane fields of north Queensland, Robson described Tarzan's renown in the area, and how "every one of the 50-odd people" they approached for clues on his whereabouts knew who he was:

"You mean Tarzan?" they say, or, "The old bloke with the sugar bag?" or "The guy who paddled a log to PNG?" From the Cairns CBD to the little town of Gordonvale, 20-odd kilometres to the south, every cop, barmaid, shopkeeper, cabbie and farmer we ask has seen him... but not today.

Jung explained to Robson how he had spent hundreds of hours looking for Fomenko, and even on occasions when he would find him, sometimes he (Fomenko) would decide not to talk to him. Jung explained at the time that Fomenko had a place where "he usually lives", which was amongst the roots of a giant strangler fig. Jung also explained how he had helped Fomenko to work on his "latest canoe" on occasions, but explained the difficulty of communicating with the man in that he "occupies his own world, and each time I see him it's a bit like starting from scratch."

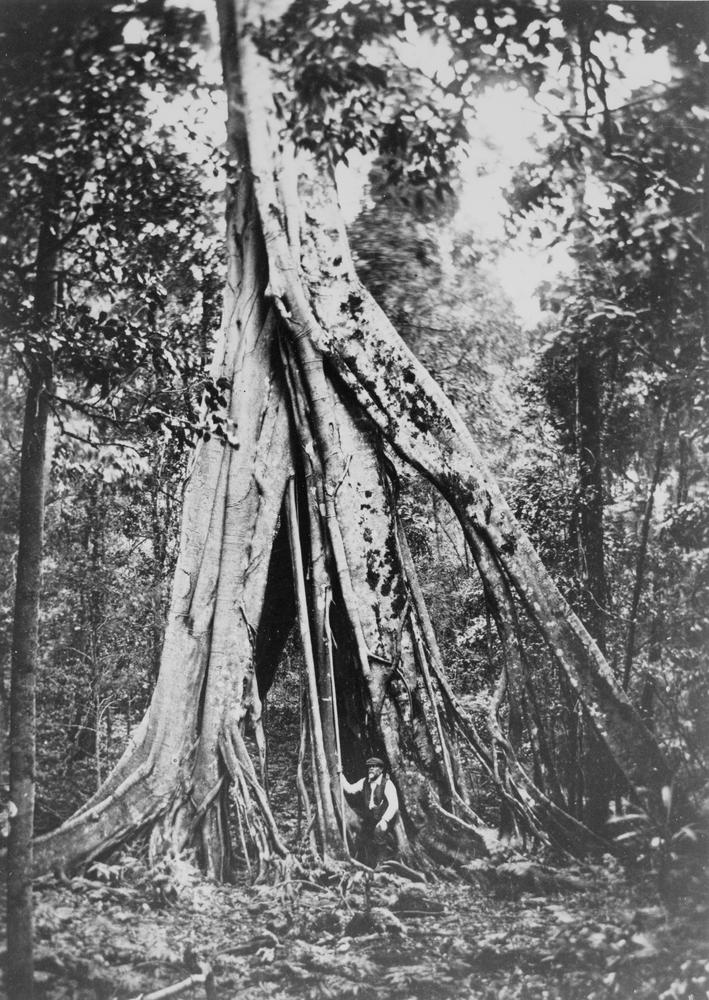
A giant strangler fig photographed in the Bunya Mountains, Queensland, in 1913

In 2016, Greg Reghenzani, whose family owned a sugar cane farm at Gordonvale, south of Cairns, brought James Vyver, an ABC News reporter, to a tree near their property in which Fomenko had formerly slept. Vyver described the journey to get to the tree:

After a short drive we come to the far end of the Reghenzanis' property, where the bright green cane fields meet wine-bottle coloured bush crowded along the banks of the Mulgrave River (..) We climb down a slippery bank onto an old riverbed and into a mass of vines, palms and giant trees. Mosquitoes are everywhere. It's dark, humid and the air is thick with the musty smell of wet mud (..) "They send the SAS out bush to get hard, but this is just how he lived," says Greg as we stand at the foot of a giant fig tree that Michael slept in. "He was an incredible guy."

Writing in 2016, ABC News wrote that Fomenko was "Part adventurer, part bushman, part vagrant — he was a hero or an oddity, depending on who you asked." Also in 2016, the Cairns Post placed Fomenko at Number 4 in its Top 50 Most Influential People list.

=== Move to a nursing home ===
At some point in 2012, Fomenko disappeared from public life in the Cairns district, and online forums were "full of messages from residents, worried about whatever happened to the ageing bushman", according to the Cairns Post. Innisfail police Senior Constable Scott Hayes was quoted as saying "he remembered Mr Fomenko well", and that he used to wave at officers while walking along the road, adding "To my knowledge he has disappeared from the public spotlight." Speculation grew amongst the northern Queensland community that he may have died alone in the bush.

In September 2015, the Cairns Post reported that Fomenko had been found and was living in the 'Cooinda Aged Care' nursing home in Gympie, southern Queensland. It transpired that during an attempted walk which Fomenko had been attempting to complete from Cairns to Sydney to visit his sister Inessa, he had taken ill near Gympie in late 2012 (ABC Radio states 2013), and spent time at Gympie Hospital, after which he was referred to Cooinda by the doctor who had been treating him.

Frank Robson contends that it may have been a wish to reconnect with his family which finally encouraged him to make the trip in 2012/13, or "perhaps, given his age and the appalling conditions he endured for so long, he'd simply had enough."

A clinical nurse at Cooinda confirmed to the Cairns Post that Fomenko was by then confined to a wheelchair at the facility, but was very mobile nonetheless, "self propelling" in the wheelchair. The nurse assured that Fomenko was otherwise "quite happy here, he doesn't communicate with anyone, he's a loner, but he's happy and contented here."

In October 2015, the Sydney Morning Herald published an article on Fomenko, noting that "Until a few years ago, the old man was still living in bush hideouts south of Cairns", but was now living an indoor life:

At 85, Fomenko has taken his solitariness indoors. He doesn't speak to other residents at the home, and, after assuring his followers in the north he was okay, declined all requests for interviews. "As far as we're aware, he's alone in the world," says Cooinda's CEO Robyn Kross. "He has no visitors and no known family connections... he came to us [from Gympie Hospital] with nothing, not even his sugar bag. He communicates a little with staff, but that's pretty much it."

Fomenko told staff upon his admission to the facility that he had been on his way to Sydney to visit his parents, which Kross had to explain to him were both dead. Kross attributed the memory loss to Fomenko's "earlier ordeals with electric shock therapy" which seemed to have led to decades of his life "slipping by unnoticed." Fomenko replied to Kross that it was possible his parents were both still living, although they would both be over 100 years old. The whereabouts of Fomenko's two other sisters were unknown as of October 2015, and when Kross offered to try find them through the Salvation Army, Fomenko initially agreed. However, when the necessary documents were arranged, Fomenko changed his mind and would not sign.

In January 2018, ABC Radio National released a thirty-minute documentary about Fomenko's life entitled "Finding Australia's Tarzan".

== Death ==
Fomenko died at Babinda Hospital on 17 August 2018, aged 88. A private cremation service was held in Innisfail.

== Physical description ==
As part of a 2018 ABC radio documentary, Cairns locals were interviewed about Fomenko, and described his personality and physical description in soundbites:

"He had a huge reputation in Cairns as just one of these great characters"... "y'know, you asked at shops, newsagents – everyone knew him"... "bronzed skin"... "aw, he was so fit"... "very tall, muscly sort of fella"... "about six foot something I suppose?"... "his hair blowing"... "hard to tell what age (he was)"... "sugar bag on his shoulder"... "knife and a tomahawk"... "he was always bare chested"... "but I liked him, he was quite a nice chap"... "so you know, he was one of those people who was everywhere and nowhere"...

Chris Wighton, a Cairns musician, who once gave Fomenko a lift in his car, recollected that "in the passenger seat where he had been sitting, was this perfect outline of him in soot and dirt and probably a couple of twigs too... the smell of the guy was not unattractive, it was like campfire and soot, but it wasn't a bad smell... earthy smell."

== Jung research ==
Harold Jung (born circa 1967), described by the Sydney Morning Herald in 2011 as "perhaps the most avid of Fomenko's devotees", died at some point prior to 2015 having collected twenty years' worth of documents, photos and interviews relating to Fomenko. Jung had become "quite friendly" with Fomenko over the years and had been intending to write a book about his life.

Following Harold's death, his brother Ingram Jung approached the Cairns Historical Society with his collection in the event they might have a suggestion with what to do with it. The Society put him in touch with author Peter Ryle, who combined the research with information from the National Archives of Australia to spend twelve months writing the book "Michael 'Tarzan' Fomenko: The Man Who Dared to Live His Own Exotic Dream", which was released in February 2016.

Over the course of his research, Ryle discovered that many of the tales which surrounded Fomenko, such as him tackling crocodiles and boars with his bare hands, had no evidence to support them, and notably the supposed connection with Russian royalty was found to have just been a "family allegation". Ryle continued "I learnt most of the stories told about him either didn't happen the way they were said to have happened or... there's no way to know if it happened at all". Ryle admitted, however, that "He did paddle to West Papua, which was then Dutch New Guinea, from the Daintree... it's still a great story."

== See also ==
- David Glasheen (d. 2025), a former mining tycoon who decided to live a solitary existence on an island in Far North Queensland
- List of people who have undergone electroconvulsive therapy
- Roger Jose (1893-1963), a hermit and labourer who spent much of his life in Borroloola in the Northern Territory
- Valerio Ricetti (1898-1952), an Italian-Australian hermit who lived mainly in a cave in the Griffith area of New South Wales for a period of 23 years
- Tarzan in film, television and other non-print media, which popularised the character of Tarzan from the 1930s onwards
