= Townsville Correctional Centre =

Australian prison facility

Coordinates: 19°21′00″S 146°50′44″E

Townsville Correctional Complex
- Interactive map of Townsville Correctional Complex
- Location: Stuart, Queensland
- Status: High Security Prison
- Security class: High/Low (Male); High/Low (Female)
- Capacity: 822 Current maximum capacity 1178
- Opened: 9 April 1893

Townsville Correctional Centre is an Australian prison facility in Stuart, Queensland, Australia. The facility has been known in the past as Her Majesty's Penal Establishment Stewart's Creek, H.M. Prison Townsville, Stuart Prison and Stuart Gaol.

It was the only correctional centre in Queensland to hold mainstream males, females and protection prisoners all within the same secure perimeter. It remains the most diverse correctional facility within Queensland accommodating high secure male, high secure female, high secure male protection, low open male custody and low open female custody operations.

A new female facility began construction in June 2006 in a complex adjacent to the male section with its own secure perimeter. Female inmates were finally moved over to the new centre in December 2008.

Townsville Correctional Centre's complex also includes a Farm Area located about 2.4 kilometres (1.5 mi) south-east of the Prison, and near to the Woongarra Crematorium.

Inaugural superintendent, Mr. James Ryan, was appointed on 6 April 1893, having been promoted from his former position as the superintendent of the "old" Townsville Gaol, which was located at the site of the current Townsville Central State School on Warburton street in North Ward.

Stewart's Creek Penal Establishment marked 120 years of operational service to the Queensland Community in 2013. Since the closure of Boggo Road Gaol in 1992, Townsville Correctional Centre is the longest continually operating Prison in Queensland. On 6 April 2015 it reached another milestone, the 125th anniversary of its establishment (6 April 1890) i.e. the date on which the building contractor Mr. Thomas Matthews accepted and signed the contract to construct the penal establishment, within two years. Work began on the "Her Majesty's Penal Establishment Stewart's Creek" on 9 June 1890.

== Notable people ==
Michael 'Tarzan' Fomenko (c.1930–2018), eccentric bushman was examined by a psychiatrist in the facility in 1964, before being transferred to Ipswich Special Mental Hospital

== See also ==
- List of Australian Prisons
