= Baillie Henderson Hospital =

Rehabilitation hospital in Queensland, Australia

- Queensland Health
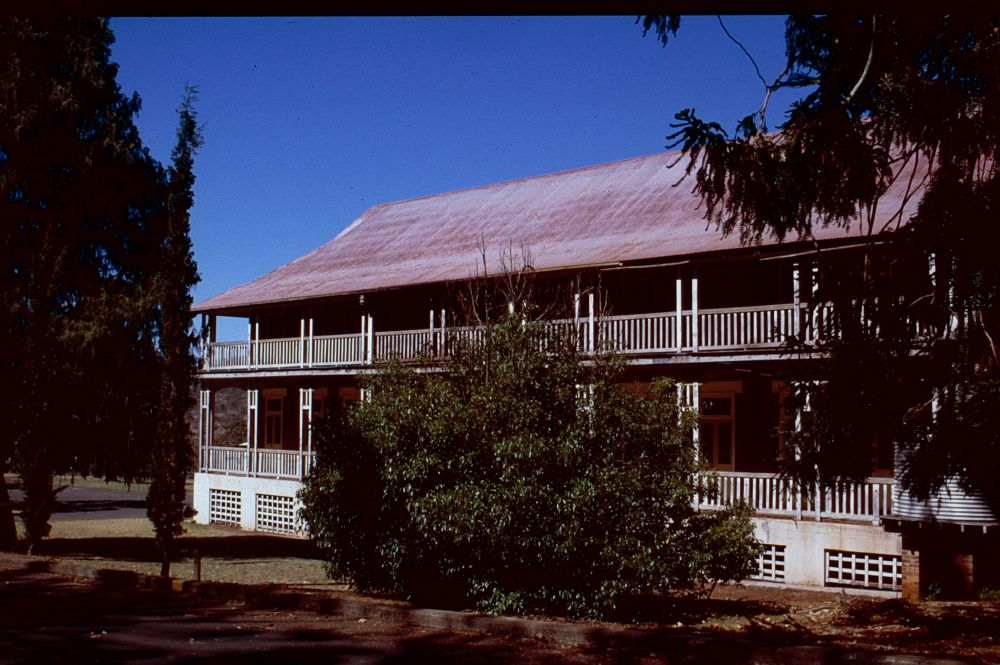
- Baillie Henderson Hospital in 1994

- Baillie Henderson Hospital in Queensland

Geography
- Location: Cranley, Queensland, Australia
- Coordinates: 27.52539750313058°S 151.93436895767493°E

Organisation
- Care system: Public Medicare (AU)
- Type: Specialist
- Network: Darling Downs Health

Services
- Beds: 400
- Speciality: Rehabilitation and mental health

History
- Former names: Toowoomba Hospital for the Insane; Toowoomba Lunatic Asylum; Toowoomba Mental Hospital
- Constructed: 1888
- Opened: 1890

Links
- Website: Baillie Henderson Hospital
- Lists: Hospitals in Australia
- Other links: Queensland Health website Darling Downs Health website

Baillie Henderson Hospital is a heritage-listed rehabilitation and mental health facility in Toowoomba, Queensland, Australia. Baillie Henderson Hospital is a public facility, owned and operated by Darling Downs Health, part of Queensland Health. It was built from 1888 to 1919, and was historically called the Toowoomba Hospital for the Insane, Toowoomba Lunatic Asylum, and Toowoomba Mental Hospital. It was added to the Queensland Heritage Register on 27 September 1999.

== History ==
Baillie Henderson Hospital is situated on the northwestern outskirts of Toowoomba. It was established as a lunatic asylum in 1890 and continues to provide psychiatric care with more than 400 patients and is the most intact nineteenth-century asylum in Queensland.

The treatment of lunacy or madness underwent a reformation in the first half of the nineteenth century in America, France and Britain from physical restraint and bizarre procedures to management through the provision of a pleasant environment and work opportunities. The new approach was based on reforming an individual by placing them in a suitable environment and by the 1860s, asylums were accepted as the most appropriate place for the treatment of insanity.

Prior to Queensland becoming a separate colony in 1859, residents who were classified as lunatics or insane and required control were simply placed in the local jail or sent south to an asylum at Sydney. Within thirty years of self-government, three asylums were operating in Queensland.

Queensland's first asylum was the Woogaroo Lunatic Asylum opened in 1865. Within a decade overcrowding was a chronic problem and a Royal Commission in 1877 recommended the establishment of asylums at Toowoomba and Rockhampton. An asylum was established at Sandy Gallop (the Challinor Centre at Ipswich) in 1878 and operated as an annexe of Goodna until 1910 when it became a separate institution. The Rockhampton asylum did not proceed and plans for the Toowoomba institution were prepared by the colonial architect John James Clark in 1885. These plans provided for a large complex with two rows of pavilion wards separated by service buildings.

The design and planning of the Toowoomba asylum was based on the principles of asylum design as enunciated by J Connolly in The Construction and Government of Lunatic Asylums and the original plan took more than 20 years to complete.

The power of symmetrical form with its inherent qualities of balance and order were used to great effect at the Toowoomba asylum in its master planning and building design. The site was laid out about an east–west axis on which service and ancillary buildings were centred with identical pairs of pavilion wards, males to the south and females to the north laid equidistant from the centre and from each other. The wards and service buildings were also of symmetrical design reinforced and connected by a continuous covered walkway. Each of the ward buildings had an associated outdoor area enclosed by a 3-metre (9.8 ft) high close-boarded timber fence into which, shelter sheds and gates were set. The requisite requirements for a pleasant environment were enhanced by landscaping which including planting of gardens and perimeter trees to create vistas and more intimate areas for repose.

Construction commenced in 1886 and by 1890 sufficient building has been completed for the asylum to open. In 1891, the Toowoomba Lunatic Asylum comprised a male (Jofre House) and female (Ray House) convalescent ward, a general female ward (Pinel House), and a group of buildings comprising the administration building (now MacDonald Hall), kitchen, bathrooms, washhouse and store and the medical superintendent's residence which was situated adjacent to Hogg Street away from the main complex. The first patients were transferred from the Goodna asylum and by the end of 1890, the number of patients totalled 196. The second male ward (Ward B - Rush House), Pinel House's complement, was completed in 1892.

Construction continued throughout the 1890s and 1900s with additional pairs of male and female pavilion wards constructed in 1898 (Male Ward C and Female Ward 3) and 1902 (Male Ward D-Clouston House and Female Ward 4 (now the Museum)), the assistant medical superintendent's residence (1899), nurses' quarters (1909) and administration block (1910). By 1910 the original plan was complete and the asylum accommodated more than 700 patients.

A second major building phase occurred in the period 1915–1919. In 1909 Dr Henry Byam Ellerton, an English-trained medical practitioner, was appointed Inspector of Hospitals for the Insane in Queensland. On his appointment, Ellerton immediately set about implementing changes and improvements to the asylums and reception houses in the state. Apart from numerous administrative changes, Ellerton oversaw a major upgrading and expansion of the infrastructure at Goodna, Ipswich and Toowoomba asylums.

At Toowoomba, five new buildings were erected as a result of Ellerton's initiatives. Ellerton was a strong advocate of the "moral treatment" approach to insanity. This approach stressed the need for providing a pleasant environment for patients and useful employment and recreation. This philosophy was evident in a pair of new large blocks erected in 1917–1919 Female Ward 5 (Whishaw House) and Male Ward E (Browne House) set within landscaped grounds with views to the surrounding countryside. Also in this period, a pair of domestic scale wards (Male Admission Ward - James House and Female Admission Ward - Hill House) and a hospital ward (Tredgold House) were completed. These buildings faced a recreation ground centred on the east–west axis of the original hospital plan. Throughout this period agriculture was important part of the asylum operations, partly to offset costs and also to provide employment for patients.

Few major building projects were undertaken in the subsequent decades. Improvements were limited to extensions to the nurses quarters (1934), new bathrooms, staff residences and laundrettes. The name of the institution was changed to the "Toowoomba Mental Hospital" following the Mental Hygiene Act of 1938. This Act signalled a number of changes in the administration of mental health and coincided with new approaches to treatment, particular the use of drug therapies. A further name change to "Toowoomba Special Hospital" followed the Mental Health Act of 1962. In August 1968 it was renamed "Baillie Henderson Hospital" in honour of Dr John Hector Baillie Henderson (1902–1981), Assistant Medical Superintendent 1939–1950 and Medical Superintendent 1950–1969.

Following decades of only minor building works, a major program of upgrading and replacing existing facilities commenced in the mid 1960s. New service buildings included laundry (1968), canteen (1968), kitchen (1972) and artisan's block (1980). New wards and accommodation facilities included Conolly, Tuke and Digby (1974), Penrose and Maudsley (1977), and Gowrie Hall complex (1991). Most of these buildings were erected to the north and west of the existing complex. Male Ward C and Female Ward 3 (1898) and the kitchen and laundry were amongst the original buildings demolished c. 1971 as part of this building program. The Recreation Complex located west of McDonald Hall was constructed during this later building program.

Since the 1980s, the number of patients has steadily declined with a greater emphasis on treating and caring for psychiatric patients in either community based facilities or facilities in general hospitals.

The Nurses' Quarters was demolished in 1997.

== Description ==
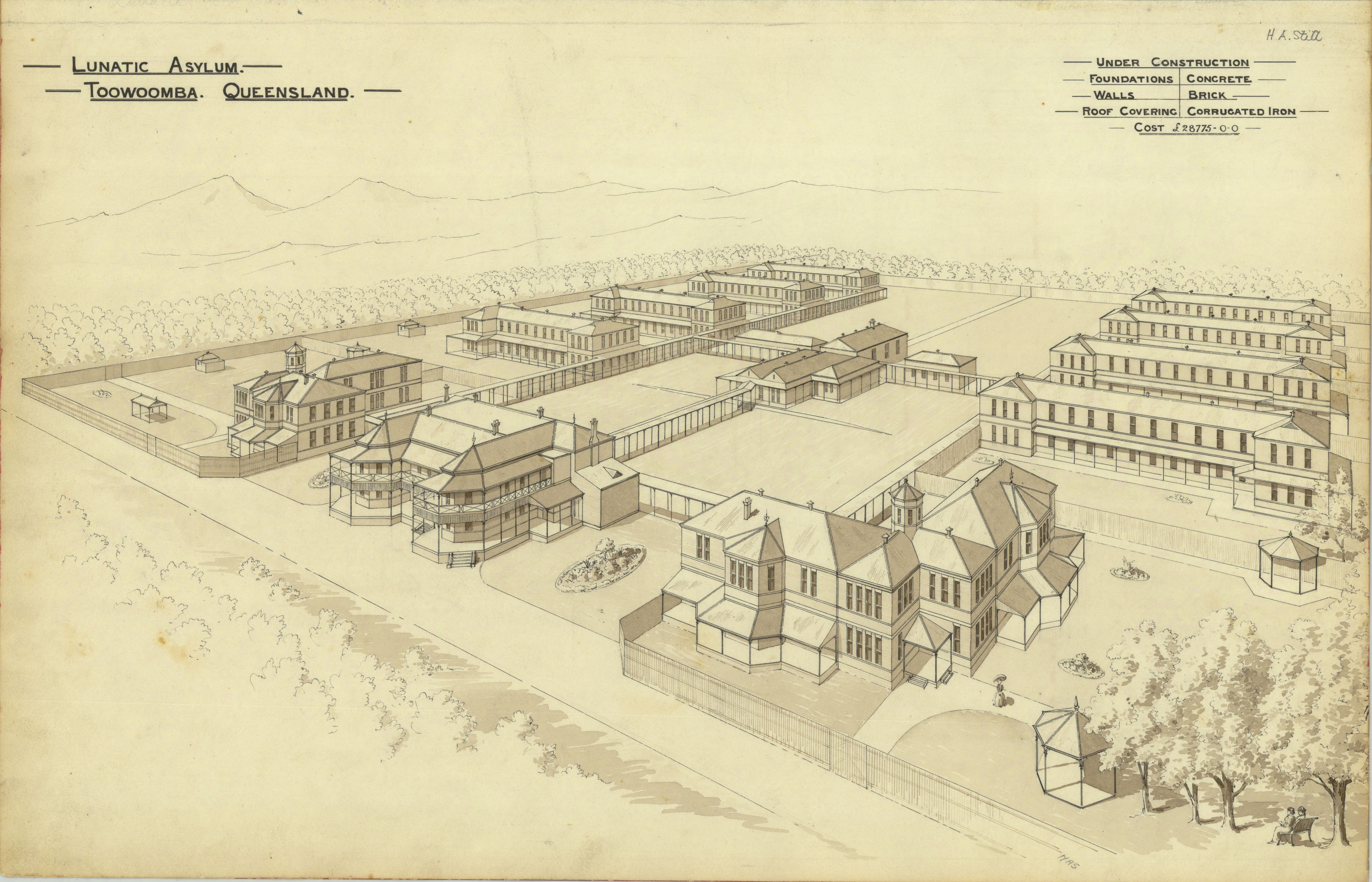
Perspective drawing of the "Lunatic Asylum, Toowoomba", circa 1888

The Baillie Henderson Hospital Complex occupies a 133.4 hectares (330 acres) site about 3 kilometres (1.9 mi) north-west of the city of Toowoomba in the suburb of Cranley. It is located on an elevated picturesque site on an east facing slope. The complex comprises over forty buildings, ten of which were constructed between 1888 and 1910 to the master plan of architect JJ Clark and five between 1915 and 1919 influenced by the principles upheld by Dr HB Ellerton.

Entry to the site is gained from the east via Mort Street or the south via Tor Street. The main access road encompasses the pre 1910 site with branches providing access to the staff accommodation at the western end of the grounds and to later hospital building to the west and north. The roads are lined with impressive avenues of mature trees including Bunya Pines.

The symmetrical layout of the hospital is still evident although obscured from some views by well developed landscaping and the large scale of the recreation and therapy complex located to the west of McDonald Hall.

The buildings, grounds and walkways connecting the buildings of the Baillie Henderson Hospital are of cultural significance and descriptions of individual elements follow.

=== Jofre House (Ward A – Male) and Ray House (Ward 1 – Female) ===
==== History ====
Jofre House and Ray House were constructed in 1888 as identical two-storey face brick masonry L-shaped convalescent wards, mirror reversed on opposite sides of the central administration and service area and forming the eastern corners of the original plan for the hospital complex. They were symmetrical in plan form about their entries at 45 degrees to the wings of the buildings. verandahs surrounded the ground floor.

On the elevated site, both wards were afforded views over the valley toward the city and surrounding area. The buildings housed a central lounge, dormitories, single rooms and attendants rooms on both floors with the dining room, servery and bathroom facilities located on the ground floor. These buildings are largely intact and continue to house patients.

==== Description ====
The convalescent wards are two-storey masonry buildings with hipped corrugated iron roofs. The red-brown English bond facebrick walls are relieved with banding at sill and floor level, contrasting lintels and multi-paned sash and frame windows. The first floor retains its symmetrical L-shape, but later single-storey masonry wings containing additional bathroom and recreation areas have been added to the east and south elevations (the north elevation of Ray House) breaking the continuity of the original surrounding ground level verandahs and restricting views.

The interiors, with the exception of the bathrooms are generally intact and contain original joinery, including staircases and doors with observation windows.

=== Rush House (Male Ward B) and Pinel House (Female Ward 2), Clouston House (Ward D) and Female Ward 4 (Museum) ===
==== History ====
The original plan for the Toowoomba asylum included six general pavilion wards, of identical design -two storey face brick masonry I-shaped buildings with hipped corrugated iron roofs, symmetrical in plan form about a north–south axis, with verandahs at ground level to three sides and a covered way to the inside elevation.

The ward buildings contained lavatories, stair, store and attendants room with fireplace in the wing adjacent to the covered way. The outside wing contained the dining room, which had two fireplaces and the wing in between along the north–south axis of the building housed an 18-bed dormitory with 10 single 8 ft × 9 ft (2.4 m × 2.7 m) cells and a stair and scullery adjacent to the dining room. The layout on the upper floors was similar, with the exception of dormitories over the lavatories and dining room and an attendant's room above the scullery.

Female Ward 2, Pinel House, was the first general ward constructed in 1888 and Male Ward B, Rush House was completed in 1892. Male Ward C and Female Ward 3 were constructed in 1898, and Clouston House and Female Ward 4 were completed in 1902.

Later wings containing bathroom facilities were added to the eastern elevation of each of the ward buildings, and semi-detached wings for recreation areas were added to the eastern elevations of Rush House and Pinel House.

Male Ward C and Female Ward 3 were demolished in 1971, and Rush House has been more recently refurbished and continues to house patients. Female Ward 4 houses the hospital's museum, and Clouston House is vacant. Shelter sheds and fencing that formed part of the original plan no longer survive.

==== Description ====
The general ward buildings are two storey I-shaped masonry buildings with hipped corrugated iron roofs. The red-brown English-bond face brick walls are relieved with banding at sill and floor levels, contrasting lintels and multi-paned sash and frame windows. Subtle differences between the construction periods of the pairs of wards is evident in the joinery treatment, window shutter details and ventilation grilles.

Pinel House is vacant and is very intact with the exception of the painting some time ago of the external face brickwork. Female Ward 4 now houses the hospital's museum and is in a very intact condition. Clouston House is also in an intact condition and is vacant and used for storage.

Rush House has been more recently refurbished and includes the removal of roof ventilator fleches and chimneys, the replacement of the roof sheeting in Colorbond sheeting and the painting of the brickwork. Changes to the interior include the addition of partitions to dormitory areas, the replacement of joinery, lining of floors and the addition of suspended ceilings and air conditioning.

=== MacDonald Hall ===
==== History ====
MacDonald Hall was first constructed in 1888 as a T-shaped single-storey masonry building with a double gabled roof over its central volume and hipped roofs over the outer wings, all surrounded by timber-framed verandahs and connected to kitchen, bathhouse and store behind and to the wards by the continuous covered walkway. Whilst designed as a recreation hall, the building was also used for hospital administration until the new administration building was completed in 1910. In 1913, the recreation hall was modified with the walls of the main hall increased in height to create a larger volume lit by high-level sash windows to all elevations and a hipped roof was added.

==== Description ====
The Administration building is a single-storey T-shaped building with verandahs to its east, north and south elevations. The walkway connected to its west elevation has been removed. It has red-brown English-bond face brick walls relieved with banding at sill levels, contrasting lintels and six pane sash and frame windows. Four pane centre pivoting sash windows are housed in the auditorium walls above the surrounding verandah roof and have contrasting lintels and sills. The hipped roof of the main hall is supported on impressive timber trusses and the raked ceiling lined with panels of v-jointed tongue and groove boards laid diagonally to the walls. The sewing room in the northern wing has had a roof light added and a small semi detached wing containing toilets has been added to the south elevation. The main hall houses a large pipe organ and contains a stage with decorative pressed metal proscenium supported on V-jointed tongue-and-groove walls. The single volume of the northern wing (the former sewing room) has been partitioned off into two rooms and only the north-western room was accessible from the stage. The southern wing was also not accessible. Fireplaces between the main hall and the wings have been bricked in. The later toilet addition is of stretcher bond masonry red-brown brick with a skillion roof.

=== Administration block ===
==== History ====
The construction of the Administration Building in 1910 completed the plan for the first stage of the Toowoomba Lunatic Asylum. The two-storey masonry building with hipped roof, clock tower and detached toilets differed from the original building illustrated in an 1888 perspective of the proposed hospital but is located in the same position along the site's central axis overlooking the circular drive and surrounding gardens.

The main entry to the building was via a central hall that opened from the front arcade into a stairhall intersected by a passage connecting the north and south side entrances to the building. Offices for the Medical Superintendent, the Assistant Medical Superintendent, the Steward, Matron, Chief Attendant, Dispensary and Hall Porter were contained on the ground floor with male visitors and female visitors' rooms located at the south and north ends of the arcade respectively. The first floor housed the Matrons' bedroom, sitting room, servant's room and kitchen as well as a library and photography and pathology room. The matron's bathroom was located on the northern end of the rear verandah and a dark room on the southern end. A stair from the western verandah led to the verandah at ground level.

==== Description ====
The Administration block is two storey brick masonry building with hipped corrugated iron roof and centred clock tower. Whilst its general architectural expression, its materials and detailing complement the hospital complex it clearly expresses the stylistic differences from the period in which it was built.

It has a symmetrical layout about its east–west axis and is located centrally between Ray House and Jofre House and along the same axis as McDonald Hall and is connected to these buildings by a covered timber framed walkway with gabled roof.

The front elevation of the Administration building presents a formal public face raised on a plinth of quarry faced stone above which an arcade of semi circular and flat arches of red-brown face brick are relieved with quarry faced stone banding, voussoirs and keystones. The corners of the arcade have parapets of ashlar stonework with curved copings which rise to form the solid corner balustrading of the verandah above. Timber verandah posts support curved verandah beams and eaves brackets and are of a scale and detail that suggest the domestic function of the first floor.

Three of the first floor verandah bays have been enclosed by a half high wall with aluminium windows above, replacing the original timber balustrading. The verandahs to the north and south have been enclosed with weatherboards and casement sash windows. The two storey timber verandah at the rear has been enclosed on the first floor with weatherboards and aluminium windows. A single storey, one room masonry addition with hipped roof has been added to the south-west and north-west corners of the building.

Detached lavatory buildings for males and females are located outside the south and north entrances. These are identical single storey red-brown English bond facebrick structures with hipped corrugated iron roofs and louvred windows with contrasting sills.

=== Browne House (Male Ward E) and Whishaw House (Female Ward 5) ===
==== History ====
Browne House and Whishaw House were erected between 1917 and 1919 to the west of Wards 4 and D as a pair of male and female ward buildings providing additional accommodation for patients needing comparatively less supervision. The buildings were part of the second stage of development of the hospital complex during Ellerton's period in office and were sited east–west facing the grounds and views.

They were constructed as two-storey masonry buildings with projecting gabled wings at each end and a larger central projecting gabled wing with bay window to both levels. The ground floor comprised a large, central dining room, sitting room, dormitory, scullery, lavatories, bathroom and stores were built in a one-storey annexe at the rear of the dining room centred between two semi detached masonry stairwells. The first floor comprised three large open dormitories.

==== Description ====
The substantial two-storey buildings with corrugated iron roofs have red-brown face brickwork to first floor level and rough-cast render above relieved with contrasting lintels and multi-paned sash and frame windows. The projecting central wing on the front elevations was finished on both levels with rough cast render relieved with contrasting quoining, banding, copings and lintels. Two storey timber verandahs provided the infill between the projecting wings of the front elevation.

The single storey annexe at the rear of Browne House has been replaced by a large two-storey masonry addition constructed c. 1970 and another single storey semi detached masonry wing with skillion roof has been added to the western end of the north elevation.

Whishaw House remains relatively intact including early bathroom and linen areas on the ground floor. The dining room is currently used for recreation for patients and therapeutic groups, which is run by Darling Downs Health Service Rehab and Recovery who also occupies the first floor.

=== James House and Hill House ===
==== History ====
James House and Hill House (also known as Tuke Annexe) were constructed between 1915 and 1917 as complementary admission wards and formed part of Ellerton's building program. These buildings continued to follow the symmetrical layout of the site but are set further away from the central axis on the outskirts of the recreation ground which they overlook. They were a result of Ellerton's desire to provide more suitable accommodation for patients and provide more privacy and views. The buildings housed 10 patients in single rooms with bathroom in the western wing, a dormitory of 12 beds with bath rooms in the eastern wing, central sitting and dining rooms with bay windows opening onto a verandah overlooking the recreation ground and semi detached kitchen and store.

==== Description ====
James and Hill Houses are a pair of single storey U-shaped buildings with hipped corrugated iron roofs, red-brown facebrick walls relieved with contrasting sills and lintels and multi-paned sash and frame windows. The verandah connecting the kitchen wing to the main structure has been enclosed on both buildings.

James House is intact and is currently being used as a site office for the redevelopment team. Hill House appears to be in an intact condition -access was not available.

=== Tredgold -Hospital Ward ===
==== History ====
Tredgold House was erected in 1917 as a hospital ward for treatment of patients with physical problems. It was one of three asylum hospitals built at the time which were all basically to the same plan. The smallest of these hospitals was built at Challinor and the other at Wolston Park which had a tile roof. Both of these are extant. Tredgold House continues to house patients.

==== Description ====
Tredgold House is a single storey red-brown face brick building of stretcher bond construction with large galvanised iron hipped roof. The building has a symmetrical plan form with a front entrance given prominence by a battened gabled end projecting above adjacent verandahs, a rough cast finish and roof fleche.

The symmetrical floor plan contains central entrance hall and office areas with a wing opposite containing kitchen and scullery. A pentagonal activity room opens into two adjoining rooms beyond the kitchen area. The two wings that open off the corridor at an angle to the central portion provide dormitory accommodation and a large activity room with later additions to the end of each of these wings providing further accommodation.

=== Assistant Medical Superintendent's Quarters ===
==== History ====
The quarters for the Assistant Medical Superintendent was built in 1898 as a single storey masonry residence with large hipped roof situated at the top of the slope on the western limit of the site for the hospital complex.

==== Description ====
The house is constructed of red-brown face brickwork with a hipped corrugated iron roof and projecting gables. It has an asymmetrical layout and includes an entrance hall, drawing room, dining room, three bedrooms, a bathroom and servant's bedroom. The pantry, kitchen and wash house are contained in a wing on the north west corner of the building with a masonry northern wall and timber framed and clad south and west wall. The house contains five fireplaces and has a verandah to the east and west.

The house is the oldest one of five occupying the western end of site and overlooking the hospital complex. The other houses built from the 1930s-1960s for staff form a residential streetscape and edge at the west of the complex.

The building is currently unoccupied but a tenant is being sought.

=== Medical Superintendent's Residence ===
==== History ====
The quarters for the Medical Superintendent was built in 1888 as a single storey masonry residence with large hipped roof situated away from the complex to the south east. In its original form the main portion of the house had a T-shaped symmetrical layout with verandahs to the north, south and east with a dining room, drawing room and two large bedrooms all with bay windows. Two small bedrooms were located at the rear of the house and a semi detached kitchen and pantry on the south eastern corner was accessible from a verandah. A later timber wing was added to the north west corner and a servant's bedroom and scullery was added to the kitchen in 1940.

==== Description ====
The house is constructed of red-brown face brickwork on a rendered base with a hipped corrugated iron roof with timber verandahs to the east and timber verandahs and bedroom wing to the west. The house was not inspected during the site visit.

The building continues to be occupied by the Medical Superintendent.

=== Recreation Ground & Landscaping ===
==== History ====
The landscape forms an integral part of the development of the Baillie Henderson Hospital complex as a major contributing element to the pleasant environment required for the treatment of patients in nineteenth and early twentieth century asylum planning. Terracing of the site, the planting of trees, hedges, gardens and the incorporation of garden elements such as shelter sheds and fencing were designed to provide an attractive and restful environment whilst providing for the requirements of containment of patients within the complex.

The recreation ground, located on the hospital plan's central axis formed an integral part of initiative of HB Ellerton for the second stage of the hospital development at Toowoomba providing a pleasant outlook from the complex of buildings erected at this time through trees to a large oval and beyond to more distant views.

==== Description ====
Approached from the east, the Baillie Henderson Hospital becomes apparent at some distance as a tree covered sanctuary on the east facing slope of the valley set back from the approach roads in a rural setting. On the site, significant and mature landscaping elements are planted along the principal driveways to the hospital proper and residences, around the buildings to provide shelter and restful gardens, to create vistas, pathways and to frame the recreation oval. These plantings include Bunya pines (Araucaria bidwilli) and many other species.

== Heritage listing ==
Baillie Henderson Hospital was listed on the Queensland Heritage Register on 27 September 1999 having satisfied the following criteria.

The place is important in demonstrating the evolution or pattern of Queensland's history.

The Baillie Henderson Hospital is important for its association with the development of mental health care in Queensland since 1890.

Although altered and extended over the years, the Baillie Henderson Hospital represents an important era in mental health care in Queensland and is the most intact group of mental health buildings of the period.

The place demonstrates rare, uncommon or endangered aspects of Queensland's cultural heritage.

Of the three main asylums built in Queensland prior to 1920, Baillie Henderson Hospital at Toowoomba is the only mental hospital in Queensland to have formal symmetrical site planning and demonstrates most clearly through this symmetry and that found in its building forms and landscaping, an asylum based on a highly formal and systematic design. It also, is the only such institution to retain its rural setting. Wolston Park, by comparison, has developed in a more haphazard and less formal manner although there are groups of buildings that are arranged in a systematic manner. The Ipswich asylum was also well planned but the buildings were arranged in an arc along a ridge to maximise views to the countryside. The buildings were not arranged in a formal and systematic manner.

The place is important in demonstrating the principal characteristics of a particular class of cultural places.

The place demonstrates the nineteenth century principles of asylum design, enunciated in its planning, landscaping and the design of its buildings. Baillie Henderson Hospital clearly demonstrates the principal characteristics of an asylum based on nineteenth and early twentieth century principles. The planning of the site and design of buildings was based on well established principles for asylum design as enunciated in John Conolly's The government and construction of lunatic asylums (first published in 1847). Another important publication concerning asylum design was the American Thomas Kirkebride, On the construction of asylums (1861). A common theme in both publications was the emphasis on the systematic arrangement of wards and service buildings and the high level of order and discipline required to control and manage a large number of patients. The buildings erected at Baillie Henderson between 1888 and 1910 were arranged in a systematic and formal manner. Despite the demolition of two of the earlier wards and some service buildings, and the erection of new buildings, the symmetrical planning is still clearly evident.

The place is important because of its aesthetic significance.

Baillie Henderson Hospital is significant for the architectural qualities of its buildings, in particular those erected in the period 1888–1919. The buildings include the Administration Building (1910), McDonald Hall (1888–1913), Jofre and Ray Houses (1888), Rush (1892) and Pinel (1891) Houses, Clouston House and the museum (1902), Browne and Whishaw House (1917), James and Hill Houses (1915–17), Tredgold House (1919), the Medical Superintendent's residence (1888) and the Assistant Medical Officer's Quarters (1899).

The hospital complex is also significant for the aesthetics of its setting as a tree covered haven in a rural landscape with views afforded both from and to the site. Its mature plantings, including avenues of Bunya Pines, contained within its grounds and gardens and along its principal driveways and pathways and around its recreation oval contribute to the pleasant setting that was a principal characteristic of asylum planning in the nineteenth and early twentieth centuries.

The place has a special association with the life or work of a particular person, group or organisation of importance in Queensland's history.

The Hospital is important for its association with the work of Colonial Architect JJ Clark and the Architectural Branch of the Department of Public Works. Clark was responsible for the site planning and design of the first stage of hospital buildings. The period between 1900 and 1915 was arguably the golden era of the Branch in terms of the quality of its work and the second stage of hospital buildings was designed and constructed during this period and are significant examples of the work produced by the Works Department.

It has added significance through its association with Dr HB Ellerton and his approach to treating insanity.

== Notable people ==
Notable staff include:

- Don Featherstone, first aid instructor and painting teacher
