= Darling Downs Health =

Local health district in the Darling Downs, Queensland, Australia

- Darling Downs Hospital and Health Service

Service overview
- Jurisdiction: Queensland Government
- Service executive: Annette Scott, Chief Executive
- Parent department: Queensland Health
- Website: darlingdowns.health.qld.gov.au

Darling Downs Health (DDH), formally the Darling Downs Hospital and Health Service, is the local health district servicing the Darling Downs region in Queensland, Australia. Darling Downs Health forms part of Queensland Health, the state's public health service, and operates 29 facilities across 90,000 km^{2} throughout the region. The health service's main referral facility is Toowoomba Hospital, which provides maternity, emergency, surgical, mental health, allied health and specialist outpatient services.

== Facilities ==
Darling Downs Health operates 29 facilities, including hospitals, community outreach and specialist services, Multipurpose Health Services, and Residential Aged Care Facilities (RACFs). Multipurpose Health Services are co-designed facilities that serve as both the local primary care clinic, and as an emergency and visiting specialist secondary care facility. RACFs provide specialist rehabilitation and geriatric care services to patients requiring dedicated nursing and allied health care.

- Toowoomba Hospital
- Baillie Henderson Hospital
- Dalby Hospital
- Goondiwindi Hospital
- Kingaroy Hospital
- Stanthorpe Hospital
- Warwick Hospital
- Cherbourg Health Service
- Chinchilla Hospital
- Darling Downs Community Care Unit
- Inglewood Multipurpose Health Service
- Jandowae Hospital
- Miles Hospital
- Millmerran Multipurpose Health Service
- Murgon Hospital
- Nanango Hospital
- Oakey Hospital
- Tara Hospital
- Taroom Hospital
- Texas Multipurpose Health Service
- Wandoan Outpatients Clinic
- Wondai Hospital
- Mt Lofty Heights Residential Aged Care
- Dr EAF McDonald Residential Aged Care
- The Oaks Residential Aged Care
- Karingal Residential Aged Care
- Milton House
- Forest View

== See also ==
- Toowoomba Hospital
- Baillie Henderson Hospital
- Queensland Health
