= Cairns Chinatown Building =

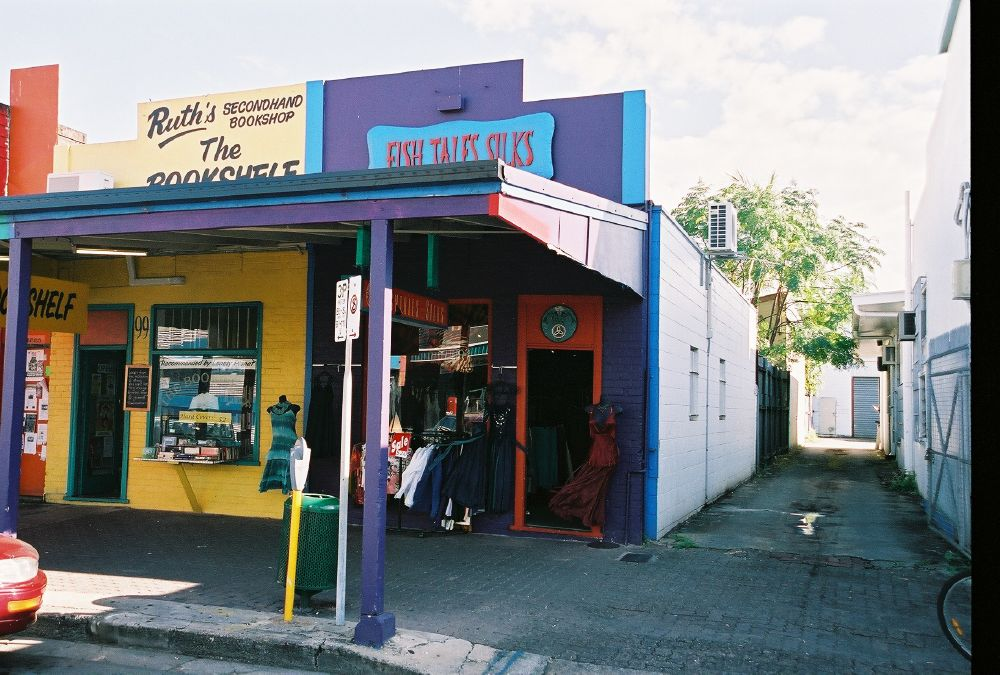
- Cairns Chinatown Building

- Location within Queensland Location within Australia
- 16.9236°S 145.7748°E
- Location: 99 Grafton Street, Cairns City, Cairns, Cairns Region, Queensland, Australia

History
- Design period: 1870s–1890s (late 19th century)
- Built: c. 1892–c. 1902

Queensland Heritage Register
- Official name: 99 Grafton St, Former Cairns Chinatown, Ruth Women's Bookshop, Andrew's Barber Shop, The Bookshelf, Fishtail Silks
- Type: state heritage (built)
- Designated: 27 May 2005
- Reference no.: 602511
- Significant period: 1890s, 1900s (fabric) c. 1892–ongoing (historical commercial use)

The Cairns Chinatown Building is a heritage-listed commercial building at 99 Grafton Street, Cairns City, Cairns, Cairns Region, Queensland, Australia. It was built from c. 1892 to c. 1902 and is one of the last remaining buildings from the Cairns Chinatown. It was added to the Queensland Heritage Register on 27 May 2005.

== History ==
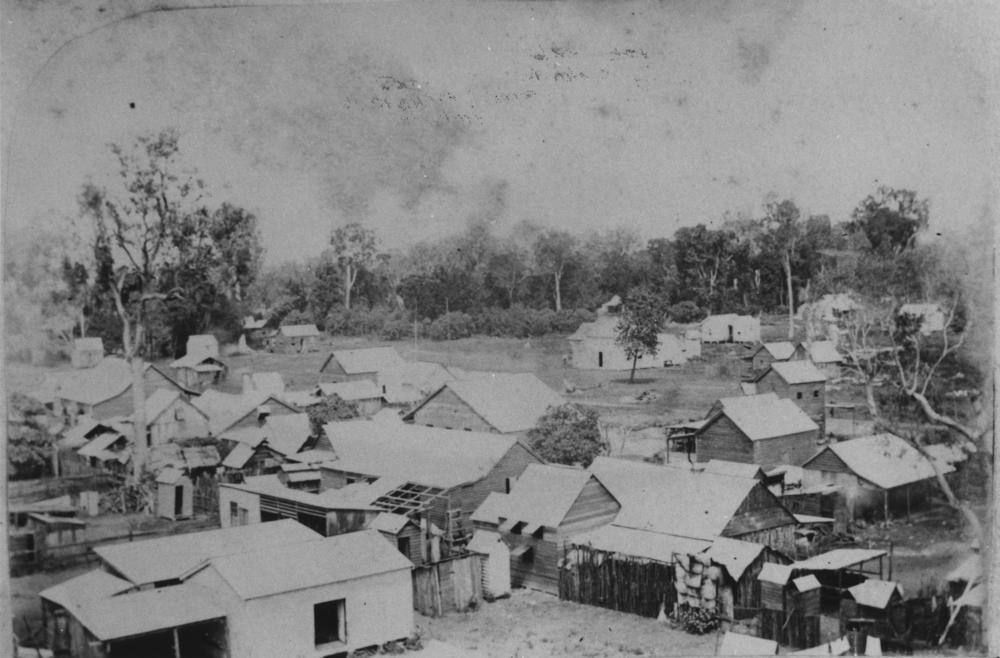
Chinatown in Cairns, 1886. It is not known if this building appears in this photo.

It is likely that the building at 99 Grafton Street, Cairns was constructed in the late nineteenth century or early twentieth century. The existing building was constructed of handmade bricks and divided into two shops with multiple gabled roof of differing heights. At the time of construction the building formed part of a much larger group of buildings which became known as Cairns Chinatown. At that time it was Lot 2, Allotment 18, Section 27, Sachs Street which has been changed to Grafton Street and in now situated on Lot 2 RP721943.

One of the first Chinese businesses in Cairns was established in Abbott Street by Mr Andrew Leon (Leong Chong) soon after his arrival in 1876. In 1881 Andrew Leon and 100 other Chinese businessmen formed a co-operative of shareholders to cultivate a selection known as Portion 52, owned by Leon. This was the first large scale sugar cultivation in far north Queensland. The mill, known as "Pioneer", was opened in August 1881 in a large event attracting many stakeholders and official guests. The mill and its assets were sold in 1886 and Andrew Leon concentrated his business interests in Sachs Street, Cairns (renamed Grafton Street in the 1930s). Andrew Leon was an innovative agriculturalist and businessman who represented the Cairns Chinese community on official occasions, presenting welcome addresses from the Chinese community, acted as an interpreter in court, and provided the means for preserving cultural linkages as one of the principle trustees for the Lit Sung Goong Temple.

The growing agricultural industry in the Cairns region supported a large number of Chinese in industries such as market gardening and shop keeping. In 1886 the Chinese population of Cairns accounted for 60% of all farmers and 90% of all market gardeners, and Sachs Street was recognized as a focus for Chinese activities. Chinese businesses in Sachs Street included boarding houses, gaming houses, opium dens and merchant stores.

Ten years after arriving in Cairns, Andrew Leon purchased allotment 18 Section 27 off Robert Philp in 1886. The allotment was subdivided into two allotments and the Lit Sung Goong Temple was constructed.

In 1892 Andrew Leon took out a substantial mortgage with the Queensland National Bank for £200 (and further advances) on Lot 2 Allotment 18. The next year four shops were noted for the first time in the Cairns Municipal Rates Book on Lot 2, Allotment 18. A Chinese bricklayer Lee Bat was noted by The Cairns Post in October 1896 as working in the district and the Cairns Argus noted that the Temple on Lot 1 had a great brick oven.

Andrew Leon leased the property to merchants Lee Yan Kee, a consortium of four brothers. One of the brothers Lee Yan, brought his wife and a child servant from China in 1895 and they are the first Chinese women to arrive directly from China to live in Chinatown. They then lived behind the adjoining timber building until 1902.

In late 1902 Andrew Leon took out another loan for £200, this time with the Bank of North Queensland. Two shops on the site were subleased to a Chinese man and a Japanese prostitute O'Kunato in 1903. This was the beginning of a long association with the property being used to house women who worked as prostitutes. Three Japanese women worked at different periods from the shop until 1922; after which European women then took up the tenancy. They lived and worked in either one or both sides of the building for the next forty-four years. In 1922, the last of the Japanese women tenants, Osangi, left the shops. In her place, Mrs Miller took up residence and she lived and worked there under the euphemism of "domestic duties" for the next ten years.

In October 1908 Andrew Leon entered an arrangement with Goon Chew who had placed a caveat over the land until it was purchased by another leading merchant Willie Ming in 1911. When he purchased it he also took over Andrew Leon's mortgage. The place was resold in 1914 to Neils Schmidt who died not long after and it passed to his beneficiaries who owned the property until mid 1925. The property was then bought by Frank Lee Chin (See Chin) in a private agreement because he took out a loan with the previous European owners. He was a wealthy sugar cane farmer in the district.

In the 1930s Sachs Street was renamed Grafton Street through the efforts of the city's alderman to clean up the image of the area. In 1932 Frank See Chin, sold the property to John Hasting Reed. Chinese shopkeepers and women tenants continued to live in the building until the Second World War. After the Second World War the shops were utilised commercially in the same way as the rest of the Cairns central business district.

In the 1950s the Deeb brothers bought 99 Grafton Street and minimal changes were made during this time. The addition to the parapet may have been constructed during this period.

In the late 1960s the northern shop was occupied by a self-service Laundromat and the southern shop by an electrical repair shop.

In the 1970s the northern building was rented by Andronicos Stylianou who operated a successful barber shop from the premises for thirty years. At the time he was to move in the owners were required by the Cairns City Council to replace a timber stud frame wall with horizontal boarding. This wall had windows which were removed at the same time. This was replaced with cement block wall with window openings and louvres in the block wall with metal frames. At the time, the roof ceiling was supported and the corrugated roof replaced. While he built an internal wall to assist business operations, this was later removed after he had left.

Later a second hand bookshop operated by Ruth's Women's Shelter later occupied the northern shop, while the southern shop was occupied by Fish Tales Silks.

Since 1997, the property has been occupied by Fetta's Greek Taverna.

== Description ==
99 Grafton St, Cairns is located on the western side of Grafton Street, between Shields Street and Spence Street. The building is constructed of hand made brick and divided into two shops. The hand made bricks are irregular in size, bright red and indicate clay high in iron. They are wood-fired and some bricks display variations of colour within the brick indicating uneven firing temperatures. There are also kiss marks present on some of the bricks where they have been stacked close together. The bricks themselves display the use of river sand in the clay and occasional largish fragments of stone. On the outside of some the bricks a definite pattern of fabric similar to canvas or cotton drill is imprinted indicating that the bricks were laid out on canvas or cloth sheeting, rather than on a Hack Barrow. Some have marks like trowel marks, others have scrape marks and some evidence of hand and finger marks usually made when the brick is handled when soft. There are also plug joins on some bricks where two different plugs of clay have been placed into the mould during the molding process and signs of damage from being handled or dropped before drying. The bricks are laid in a variation of English garden wall bond also known as Colonial bond. They are not second hand and are not consistent with the size or scale of modern brick making techniques. They are more consistent with an earlier period before the 1930s.

The bricks are not laid by an expert bricklayer which is indicated by an irregular variation of the header courses from 4 rows apart to 12 between the stretcher rows. The mortar is quite hard and struck in the same way consistent with a building in Abbott Street built the late 1880s. The southern wall runs back from the front to the back past the main roof at a similar height but becomes a parapet end to the skillion roof. The hand made bricks are in all brick elevations, the side rear and front of the shops and in the parapet section over the skillion at the back. The place shows an early construction method with the wall top plate for the roof tied down with hoop iron straps which come down from the outside and are built into the mortar course two brick courses down.

The shop front has a wide awning that extends out over the footpath. Two doors fronting Grafton Street, which are set off centre, provide access to each shop. Next to each door is a large display window. The front window on the southern shop has been replaced with a window incorporating louvres but the northern shop moulded outer timber window frame remains original but has been modified from four panes to a single pane. Above each door is another smaller window, possibly originally a hopper. A brick parapet was made prior to 1927 and the midsection of the parapet raised at the front sometime after. There are 2 steeply pitched corrugated iron gabled roofs over each shop, of uniform height. The gabled roof on the northern shop has remained the same but the southern shop has been altered to a similar pitch. There is patchy flat metal flashing against the parapet. The rear skillion and framing is old and slightly bowed.

The interior of the shops incorporate a timber ceiling at an approximate height of 11 feet (3.4 m) and is made out pine of ex-6-inch (150 mm) beaded tongue in groove boards. The shops are each divided into two sections, the main commercial area of the shop in the front and a smaller back room large enough for storage, a small kitchenette or small bedroom. In the northern shop there is evidence of the use of wide boards for lining in the back room. Some sections of internal lining have been removed due to termite damage and remaining boards also show damage. In the back portion of the northern shop a timber stud frame is lined with more modern sheet lining panels. This covers some of the walls and the ceiling. The southern shop shows signs it was once divided into three rooms and the lining is not original. The building has a concrete floor that is roughly laid in irregular sized sections. At the back of the shop a low door leads out to a garden. Between the floor and the door a concrete lip has been built.

Two small timber framed windows with a wrought iron lintel are visible on the southern wall of the southern shop. The sill appears to be constructed of rendered brick and is consistent with other places constructed pre-1900 around Cairns. Metal bars cover the window, which are not considered part of the original structure. The double hung sash windows are constructed of silky oak.

== Heritage listing ==
Cairns Chinatown Building was listed on the Queensland Heritage Register on 27 May 2005 having satisfied the following criteria.

The place is important in demonstrating the evolution or pattern of Queensland's history.

The building is important in demonstrating the evolution of Queensland's history, in particular the building reflects Queensland's early multicultural society, specifically the important role of early Chinese settlers in the development of commercial activity in the Cairns region.

The place demonstrates rare, uncommon or endangered aspects of Queensland's cultural heritage.

The building is important in demonstrating rare and uncommon aspects of Queensland's cultural heritage. Together with the building at 55 Grafton Street, the former Sun Wo Tiy building, they are thought to be the last remaining structures directly associated with the former Cairns Chinatown. 99 Grafton Street is a rare surviving example of Queensland Chinese cultural heritage.

The place has potential to yield information that will contribute to an understanding of Queensland's history.

The building has the potential to yield information that will contribute to an understanding of Queensland's history. The building has undergone modification and elements of the original style may still exist underneath new additions. The bricks used to construct the building could provide additional information on early bricks and brickmaking techniques in Queensland. Sub-surface archaeological deposits, including Chinese artifacts, are expected on the allotment.

The place has a strong or special association with a particular community or cultural group for social, cultural or spiritual reasons.

The building has a strong or special association with a particular cultural group for social, cultural and spiritual reasons. As the last remaining small commercial building of the former Cairns Chinatown, the Cairns Chinese Community have expressed a strong association with the place as it represents a tangible link to the activities of the former Chinese community who lived and worked there. Many residents have direct family ties to these early Chinese settlers. The Cairns Chinese community occupied Cairns Chinatown primarily from the 1880s to the 1950s, however the Chinese connection with this portion of Grafton Street has in many ways never been broken. Today, the office of the Cairns and District Chinese Association Inc. is located at 103a Grafton Street.
