= Ipswich Mental Hospital =

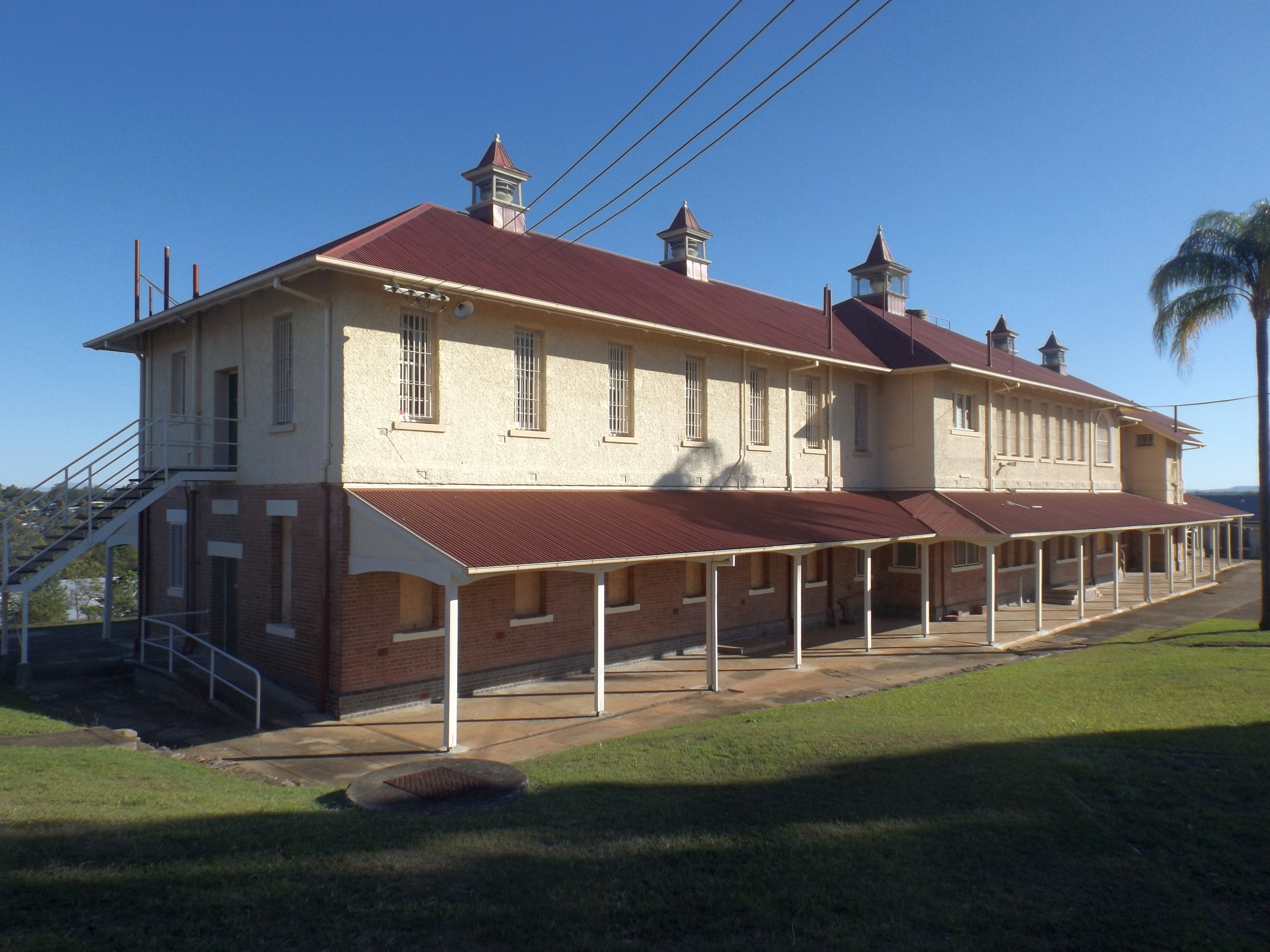
- Building in 2016

- Location within Queensland Location within Australia
- 27.6284°S 152.7555°E
- Location: 3 Parker Avenue, Ipswich, City of Ipswich, Queensland, Australia

History
- Built: 1933–1940

Site notes
- Architect: Queensland Works Department
- Architectural style: Georgian

Queensland Heritage Register
- Official name: Challinor Centre, Ipswich Hospital for the Insane, Ipswich Mental Hospital, Sandy Gallop Asylum
- Type: state heritage (built)
- Designated: 2 December 1996
- Reference no.: 601821
- Significant period: 1908–1946 (fabric); 1878–1968 (historical)
- Significant components: tree groups – copse, bathroom/bathhouse, machinery/plant/equipment – health/care services, ward – block, boiler room/boiler house, flagpole/flagstaff, kitchen/kitchen house, hall – concert, other – health/care services: component, garden/grounds, disinfecting room, trees/plantings, kerbing and channelling, laundry / wash house, tank – reservoir, driveway, tree groups – avenue of, hospital, orchard, store/s / storeroom / storehouse, garden – bed/s, pathway/walkway, office/administration building, chimney/chimney stack

Ipswich Mental Hospital is a heritage-listed psychiatric hospital at 3 Parker Avenue, Ipswich, City of Ipswich, Queensland, Australia. It was designed by Queensland Works Department and built from 1933 to 1940. It is also known as Ipswich Hospital for the Insane, Sandy Gallop Asylum, and Challinor Centre. It was added to the Queensland Heritage Register on 2 December 1996.

== History ==
Sandy Gallop asylum, as it was first known, was established in 1878 as a branch asylum of the Goodna asylum. It occupied a 140-acre site on the southern outskirts of Ipswich. The main building consisted of a single storey timber and masonry structure which contained three dormitories and two day rooms. The asylum received mainly chronic cases from Goodna. By the 1880s, it was accommodating more than 100 patients.

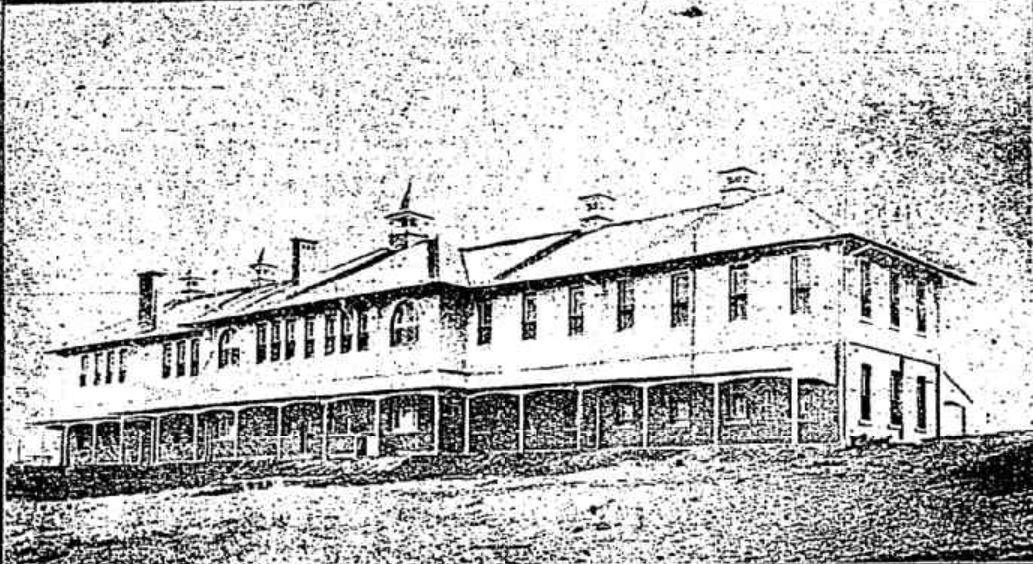
New ward for the male patients, 1908

The constant growth in admissions of patients to asylums in Queensland prompted the creation of Sandy Gallop as a separate institution. From 1910 it was known as the Ipswich Hospital for the Insane. A major building program was undertaken between 1908 and 1917 at the instigation of James Hogg who was the Inspector of Hospitals for the Insane (1898–1908), and his replacement Henry Byam Ellerton (1909–1937). Buildings erected included two male wards, three female wards, hospital, administration building, laundry, recreation hall, kitchen, boiler house, and medical superintendent's residence. By 1920 the asylum was accommodating almost 450 patients.

Changes in legislation in 1938 and approaches to the treatment of mental patients saw the name of the institution change to the Ipswich Mental Hospital in 1938. The number of patients continued to grow throughout the 1940s and 1950s and overcrowding and staff shortages became major problems. Another phase of building activity occurred in the late 1950s and early 1960s but did little to alleviate the difficulties of overcrowding. By the 1960s, more than 600 patients were being accommodated in the institution.

As a result of the reorganization of mental health services in 1968, the institution was designated as a training centre for the intellectually disabled. It was renamed Challinor Centre and remodeled. In 1973 the original 1878 building was demolished and replaced by a substantially larger single storey brick complex. Other new buildings included a canteen (1978), workshops (1979) and a staff development centre (1981). Attention was given to providing recreational facilities for residents and in 1978 a sporting oval was constructed on part of the site of the former farm.

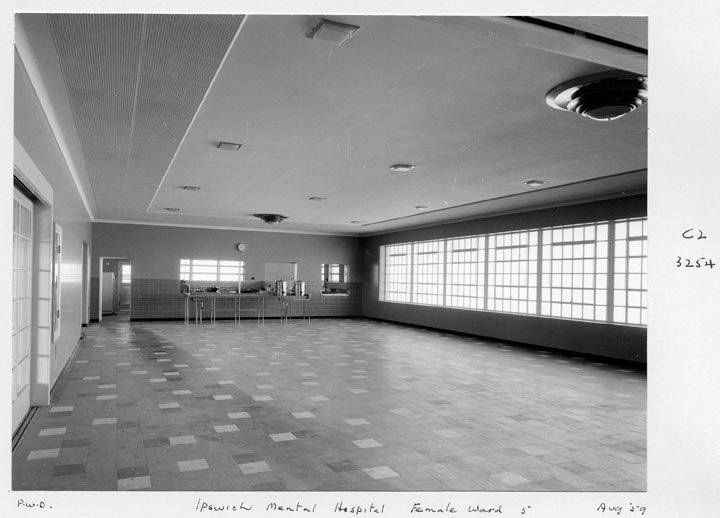
Female Ward, 1959

These building works and improvements were intended to forge a new identity for Challinor and make a distinction from its previous role as a lunatic asylum and mental hospital. This process also involved the demolition of buildings of the previous era where possible. Almost all evidence of farming activities including sheds and yards had been removed by the late 1970s. In 1973 Allison House (the former No 1 female ward) was demolished and a section of the nurses quarters was demolished in 1981. The former medical superintendent's residence was demolished in 1984 after being partially damaged by fire.

Since the 1970s a program of normalization and deinstutionalisation and has seen a steady decline in the numbers in the centre. Clients have been encouraged and assisted to move into community based accommodation, and plans are at hand to close the centre totally.

The Challinor Centre closed in 1998. The site then became the Ipswich campus of the University of Queensland. In 2015, the campus was transferred to the University of Southern Queensland although the University of Queensland will continue to run some courses on the site.

== Description ==
The Challinor Centre is a place which contains many buildings and items of significance. These include:

- the old pavilions:
  - Blair Pavilion (1908)
  - Byron House (1917)
  - Charles Pavilion (1917)
  - Clair House (1917)
  - Dagmar House (1933)
- buildings constructed as part of the administration/recreation/service area in the center of the site
  - the Administration Building (1914)
  - Bakery (1913)
  - Bath Houses (1913)
  - Boiler house and Chimney (1913 & 1946)
  - Former Disinfecting Room (1919)
  - Kitchen (1913)
  - Laundry (1912)
  - Store (1917)
  - Recreation Hall (1916)
- the former hospital:
  - Grace House (1917)
- features on the site including mature trees, grounds, roadways and the Reservoir (1914) located between the administration area and Byron House.

The site is accessed via Parker Avenue which runs alongside the show reserve from the Ipswich Boonah Road. The planning of the site is divided into distinct male and female areas separated by administration/recreation/service area which is sited at the end of the entrance driveway. A feature is the radial planning which facilitated development on the ridge line and allowed buildings to be positioned to provide the best views for patients. Roadways follow this radial planning.

Significant buildings are well designed and of individual architectural merit. Blair Pavilion is the largest building on the site and is in an arts and crafts style with dark brickwork and stucco walls and a high pitched roof. The Administration Building is in a neo-classical Georgian style and provides an imposing vista upon entering the site. The remaining buildings in the recreation/service area are in the arts and crafts style. Other significant buildings on the site are bungalow style brick structures, low set, allowing patients easy access to the grounds. These include Dagmar House, Byron House, Charles Pavilion, Clair House and Grace House.

The site has extensive grounds and contains many mature trees and some gardens. Some trees relate to the previous entry driveway which ran from the Boonah Ipswich Road to the original 1878 pavilion where Arthur pavilion now stands. The palm trees in front of the Administration Building were planted shortly after that building's construction. The circular garden developed at the same time exists in form but the planting has been replaced. The site also contains remnants of the sunken fence in front of Blair pavilion and end wall of a sunken fences in the old Female division which is now part of a carport.

== Notable patients ==
- Michael 'Tarzan' Fomenko spent two years at the institution in the mid-1960s

== Heritage listing ==
Challinor Centre was listed on the Queensland Heritage Register on 2 December 1996 having satisfied the following criteria.

The place is important in demonstrating the evolution or pattern of Queensland's history.

Challinor Centre is significant as the most complete example of an asylum in Queensland based on the principles of "moral treatment", which heavily influenced the design of most asylums in the 19th and early 20th century. The principles of "moral treatment" stressed the importance of providing a pleasant environment for patients, and are evident at Challinor in the extensive vistas, the well designed buildings, the distinct areas of male and female patients, the sunken fences, the gardens and mature trees, water supply, ventilation systems, and provision of employment, and recreation areas. Challinor Centre is also significant for its pivotal role in the development of services for intellectually disabled in Queensland. Throughout the 19th century and well into the 20th century, little consideration was given to the needs of the intellectually disabled in Queensland asylums. They were simply regarded as belonging to the class of insane. A growing awareness of the special needs of the intellectually disabled in Queensland resulted in the construction of the first facilities for children at Challinor in 1933. This building, later known as Dagmar House accommodated children with severe intellectual and physical disabilities. From the mid 1930s, Challinor began to cater more and more for these children.

The place demonstrates rare, uncommon or endangered aspects of Queensland's cultural heritage.

Similar radial planning was used at Claremont Hospital in Western Australia, but the Challinor site is unique in Queensland.

The place is important in demonstrating the principal characteristics of a particular class of cultural places.

At Challinor the extensive grounds and views from the site are one of the most striking aspects and are of significance in demonstrating the principles of "moral treatment". The buildings were sited to take advantage of the vistas and the sunken fences were constructed to maximise the views from the building and give patients a sense of freedom. The south-eastern section of the golf course is significant as an open space over which there are extensive views to the south and south-east. 'Moral treatment' also emphasised the value of useful employment and recreation and the Challinor site is significant in demonstrating this. Although only remnants of farming activities remain, the laundry, kitchen and other workrooms survive as evidence of the patients' activities. Evidence of recreational activities also survive. The recreation hall survives remarkably intact. A tennis court was constructed on the open area to the south of Blair Pavilion. The present golf course was constructed during the 1920s principally for the staff but it was also intended for use by the patients. Although the Challinor site is significant as a group of buildings and features, Blair Pavilion, along with its grounds, is of special significance as an exceptionally intact example of a building based on the philosophy of "moral treatment". No other building within the network of Queensland asylums more successfully demonstrates the principal aspects of 'moral treatment': the combination of large dormitories and single cells illustrates the separation of patients according to type of insanity; the design of the building, the sunken fences and the impressive vistas in all directions shows the importance attached to pleasant surrounds; the sophisticated ventilation system and large windows highlights the importance given to lighting and fresh air; and the remnants of the exercise yards and tennis court reveal the importance given to exercise and recreation.

The place is important because of its aesthetic significance.

Challinor Centre is significant for the architectural qualities of the buildings, in particular those erected in the period 1908–16. They included the administration building, recreation hall, service buildings, Blair Pavilion, Grace House, Byron and Clair Houses, and Charles Pavilion. The architectural branch of the Department of Public Works was responsible for the design of these buildings. The period between 1900 and 1915 was arguably the golden era of the branch in terms of the quality of its work. Many of the finest public buildings in Queensland were designed in this period and included courthouses, police stations, customs houses, public offices, and asylum buildings. The buildings at Challinor are significant examples of the work produced by the Works Department.

Of particular architectural significance are Blair Pavilion and the administration building. Blair Pavilion is an extremely good example of the Federation Arts and Crafts style. It has typical features of the style including dark brickwork, with roughcast upper walls. The external aspects of the ventilation system have been skilfully incorporated into the roof design in the form of large fleches. The administration building was designed by A S Hook, a young English architect, who after a brief period of employment with the Queensland Department of Works, had a successful and important architectural career in New South Wales. The building and its circular driveway, is an imposing entrance to the asylum. It is the front piece of the administration and service buildings. The Georgian style of the building was a speciality of the government architects office in Queensland. This building is one of the finest examples of this style in Queensland and one of the earliest. Challinor Centre is significant for its landmark qualities within the Ipswich townscape. Challinor centre occupies one of the highest ridges in Ipswich and is a landmark within Ipswich. While the showgrounds and vegetation conceals the Centre from immediate view, it is readily recognisable from more distant vantage points. From the southern side of Denmark Hill, the Centre is prominent on the southern skyline. Similarly the Challinor buildings, particularly the chimney, dominate the skyline eastwards from Lobb Street. Approaching Ipswich from the south along the Warwick Road, Blair Pavilion is prominent on the horizon. These vistas are given prominence by the openness of the site due to the minimal development of most of site and the open landscape of the golf course. This contributes to the institutional nature of the site and its landmark qualities.

The place is important in demonstrating a high degree of creative or technical achievement at a particular period.

The principles of "moral treatment" also influenced the design and planning of Wolston Park and Toowoomba asylums. However, at neither place were the principles of moral therapy as thoroughly applied or as clearly articulated as at Challinor. The site of Wolston Park was not chosen for its views but for its convenience, situated on the Brisbane River halfway between Ipswich and Brisbane. The development of Wolston Park has been haphazard. A constant shortage of funds prevented any systematic planning and major flooding in 1893 disrupted plans that had been made. Toowoomba asylum was based on the pavilion plan but the wards faced each other rather than outwards to allow for views. At Challinor, Blair Pavilion (1907) and the No 1 female ward (1908), were dramatically different. Both buildings and the layout of their features, such as sunken fences were located on a radial grid which ran around the ridge of the site in an arc. The buildings were orientated on top of the ridge looking out at the surrounding countryside. The combination of planning and site allowed the principles of "moral treatment" to be fully exploited in the physical configuration of the buildings and their grounds, and formed the basis of all future development on the site until 1940.
