= Cairns Historical Society =

The Cairns Historical Society was founded in 1958 to record and preserve the history of North Queensland, Australia.

It was formed under the sponsorship of the Cairns School of Arts and is located in the School of Arts Building, which also houses the Cairns Museum.

In 2014, it moved into temporary premises while the School of Arts Building undergoes a renovation.

As of 2014 it has 3,100 books, 23,000 photographs, 2,250 maps and 25,000 documents on local and area history.
