= The A-List: New York =

- Genre: Reality
- Theme music composer: Kaden James
- Opening theme: "A Boy Like Me"
- Country of origin: United States
- Original language: English
- No. of seasons: 2
- No. of episodes: 22

Production
- Executive producers: Christopher Willey; David Stefanou; Glenda Hersh; Steven Weinstock
- Running time: 42 minutes
- Production company: True Entertainment

Original release
- Network: Logo TV
- Release: October 4, 2010 – October 17, 2011

Related
- The A-List: Dallas

The A-List: New York is an American reality television series from the LGBT-interest network Logo that ran from October 4, 2010, to October 17, 2011.

== History and description ==
Frequently described as a Real Housewives-style show, the series followed the lives of six gay and bisexual men in New York City. It was announced under the title Kept, but the title was changed in pre-production. The series debuted on October 4, 2010.

On January 18, 2011, Logo announced a second season for the series. Season two began airing on July 25, 2011, and consists of 12 one-hour episodes. The entire original cast returned along with one new cast member. The season picked up several months after where the first season left off.

The A-List: New York was canceled in June 2012.

== Cast ==
- Reichen Lehmkuhl: known for winning the 4th season of The Amazing Race with former husband Chip Arndt and for his relationship with singer Lance Bass, Lehmkuhl is a model, author, actor, activist, jewelry designer and former Air Force pilot.
- Rodiney Santiago: a model from Brazil, Santiago is, at the beginning of the series, Lehmkuhl's boyfriend. Santiago is bisexual and his relationship with Lehmkuhl is his second with a man.
- Mike Ruiz: Ruiz is a film director and fashion photographer whose work has appeared in Interview and Vanity Fair. He had previously appeared on other reality series including America's Next Top Model and RuPaul's Drag Race.
- Austin Armacost: a model, Armacost dated designer Marc Jacobs for a short time.
- Derek Lloyd Saathoff: a former model turned casting agent.
- Ryan Nickulas: hair stylist and owner of Ryan Darius salon.

== Critical reception ==
Reviews for The A-List: New York were mixed. The New York Daily News found that the cast could be "tiresome" but held out hope for some quality drama. The A.V. Club was sharply critical, calling the cast "vapid and materialistic" and characterizing the series as being "about stupid people doing stupid things". Entertainment Weekly and Salon.com touched upon the possible cultural significance of the series. EW reflected on the outrage that some in the LGBT community have expressed about the image of gay men the series projects, answering that criticism by noting that other reality series including The Real Housewives franchise are not viewed with the expectation that its participants are representative of the class as a whole. Salon, while suggesting that the series is a source of "constant indignation" to viewers, nonetheless finds The A-List: New York to be "riveting" television and "a surprisingly thought-provoking reminder of how much representations of gay men on TV have changed and how gay identity is turning into a kind of consumer bracket rather than an act of self-expression".

== Episodes ==
=== Series overview ===
Season	Episodes	Originally released	
Season	Episodes	First released	Last released
1	10	October 4, 2010	December 6, 2010
2	12	July 25, 2011	October 17, 2011

=== Season 1 (2010) ===
No. overall	No. in season	Title	Original release date
1	1	"Codeword Delicious"	October 4, 2010
Reichen prepares for his stage debut in My Big Gay Italian Wedding. His busy schedule prevents him from helping Rodiney find a New York modeling agent so Reichen sends Rodiney to Mike for assistance. Austin begins training with trainer Mario Godiva Green to lose weight in preparation for relaunching his modeling career. He also sets about rekindling his romantic relationship with Reichen. The boys all turn out for Reichen's debut; he is proud of his performance but less pleased with the bad reviews he receives. Mike photographs Kelly Rowland for his "transformation project".
2	2	"Hanging With the Big Boys"	October 11, 2010
Ryan prepares for his 30th birthday party, a benefit for the Ali Forney Center for homeless LGBT youth by getting botox from his dentist. Reichen and Austin go out to dinner and Reichen wonders if it's a date. Rodiney does a photo shoot with Mike, then he and Reichen prepare to move into a new apartment. Derek and Austin spend time together in The Hamptons and Derek finds Austin's manners and his penchant for commenting on Reichen's genitalia appalling. Derek tells Reichen about it and he confronts Austin at Ryan's party.
3	3	"Love Bares All"	October 18, 2010
The guys are shocked to learn that Austin has been keeping his boyfriend of two years a secret and that they are engaged. Ryan decides to make Austin his "project" by serving as a mentor. Reichen unveils the new decor for his and Rodiney's apartment to general disapproval. Rodiney meets with a potential agent but is too short. Derek visits a "millionaire matchmaker" who sets him up with someone he'd already dated. At Carnival, a weekly party hosted by Amanda Lepore, Derek gets drunk and meets a man while Rodiney is upset by Reichen's drinking and flirtations with other guys. At home Rodiney confronts Reichen about his attitude, leading Reichen to say he doesn't like coming home to the situation anymore.
4	4	"A Hot Messy Pride"	October 25, 2010
Derek and new assistant Gina meet with a party planner to put together Derek's gay pride party. He meets Roberto, the man he met at Carnival, for a date and invites him to the party but Roberto doesn't show. Reichen and Rodiney meet Derek and Ryan for a spa day and discuss their relationship issues. The couple later meet with a counselor who tries to help them sort things out. Ryan takes Austin to a stylist friend and arranges a photo shoot for him but is appalled when Austin poses nude. Austin and Jake discuss meeting with an immigration lawyer they contacted through Ryan but don't make the meeting, with Austin claiming to Ryan that he and Jake got into a fistfight the night before. Mike does a photo shoot to benefit cancer patients. His dad Tony flies in for Pride and they reflect on their relationship. Ryan tells Derek that Austin is out of his life. When Austin shows up at Derek's party, he, Ryan, Derek and TJ have an altercation.
5	5	"All Fired Up"	November 1, 2010
Derek and TJ reflect on the blowup with Austin and make plans to spend July 4 weekend Fire Island Pines, New York. Reichen and Rodiney rehash their therapy session and, to contribute financially to the relationship, Rodiney plans a calendar. Derek has lip injections to prepare for an impromptu drag party. Mike and Ryan exchange colonic stories. Reichen's half-sister visits and they discuss whether she should come out to her parents. Reichen learns that he's being dropped from the play. He meets up with Austin and invites him to Fire Island for the holiday. On the Island, Austin's antics lead to another clash with Derek and TJ.
6	6	"Texting and Tears"	November 8, 2010
Reichen decides to hold a model search for a "co-pilot" to represent his jewelry line. Mike, Derek and TJ will serve as judges. Ryan and Rodiney go shopping and Rodiney tearfully confesses that he searched Raichen's phone and discovered texts that he believes prove Reichen cheated on him. Rodiney later tells Mike that he sent texts to Reichen's friend pretending to be Reichen. Derek and Roberto go out to dinner and Derek invites him to meet his mother. Derek, his mother Lisa and TJ go on a Hudson River cruise out of Chelsea Piers but Roberto stands Derek up with a one-word text, "Sorry". Rodiney and Reichen argue and break up, with Rodiney returning to Miami, possibly permanently.
7	7	"Going Down in Flames"	November 15, 2010
Rodiney books a job in Miami but his agent Julian tells him that it is not a good time to move back permanently. Austin brings champagne to Reichen's place. They discuss Reichen's living arrangements and Austin suggests that Reichen should stay single for a while. Derek, Ryan and TJ plan a trip to Maine with Reichen and they are horrified that Reichen wants Austin along. Derek and TJ decide to make up with Austin to make Reichen happy. Later they meet Austin for drinks and Austin apologizes for his behaviour. The group meets Reichen following his last performance and Rodiney shows up unexpectedly. Everyone but Mike meets for dinner. Reichen and Rodiney announce their reconciliation and Austin expresses shock and disbelief. He and Rodiney argue and the altercation turns physical.
8	8	"Mainetervention"	November 22, 2010
Reichen tries to manage the guys when they in various combinations refuse to go to Maine depending on whether Rodiney or Austin goes. Finally the various factions agree that they will all go. At Lake Pennesseewassee, Reichen confesses to Austin that he's lost the "boyfriend feeling" for Rodiney. Austin agrees to back off to let Reichen decide what to do about his relationship. Rodiney and Austin apologize to each other but the apologies turn into an argument and Reichen wonders aloud if he should have broken up with Rodiney earlier. Ryan discusses his marriage and Austin bursts into tears, apologizing profusely for coming between Rodiney and Reichen. Reichen privately tells Rodiney that he is tired of the stress of their relationship. Mike does not go to Maine as he has a fundraiser for The Trevor Project with Vanessa Williams being honored.
9	9	"To the Sky"	November 29, 2010
Mike prepares for his first solo show at the Leslie/Lohman Gallery. He has photographs taken of himself as various Tom of Finland characters for inclusion in the show. Ryan tells TJ that he has an appointment with a surrogacy counselor in hopes of having a child. Austin tells Derek that he is going back to England and may not return. Reichen records a single, "To the Sky", based on a letter he received from a gay Air Force pilot, in support of repealing Don't ask, don't tell. He performs the song live at a party he and Rodiney host. Everyone praises his performance to his face, but Reichen overhears Austin trashing him behind his back. Reichen confronts Austin, who tells him he should break up with Rodiney. Reichen apologizes to Rodiney for not believing him about Austin.
10	10	"Reunion"	December 6, 2010
Moderator Wendy Williams introduces retrospective clips for each of the A-Listers and they field questions from viewers. Reichen and Rodiney confirm that they are still together and have gotten past their problems. Austin calls Rodiney a "prostitute", saying he sleeps with Reichen so Reichen will pay the bills. TJ reveals he has had crushes on most of the panel. Austin and Jake shock everyone by announcing that they were married in England in July.

=== Season 2 (2011) ===
No. overall	No. in season	Title	Original release date
1	11	"Dirty Exposure"	July 25, 2011
Reichen's online scandal generates gossip about his relationship with Rodiney. Austin and his husband Jake return to New York. Austin has an offer to appear on the cover of Playgirl magazine but Derek and Ryan wonder if he is in proper shape. Rodiney moves into his own apartment. TJ confides to Derek that he fears his friendship with Ryan is in trouble. Mike and Martin meet Nyasha, a budding recording artist who also owns a hair extension and wig company. Mike invites her to the launch of his t-shirt line, where she meets the rest of the group. Reichen and Rodiney like her but the rest are not impressed. At the after-party, Rodiney and Austin rehash last year's arguments. It turns physical and Austin inadvertently hits Nyasha. They meet later and he apologizes, but Nyasha dismisses him as a child and a bully.
2	12	"Porn and Prejudice"	August 1, 2011
Rodiney considers taking out a temporary restraining order against Austin but after meeting with the group decides not to. Ryan worries that he's "too gay" and that it's affecting his business opportunities but Mike assures him there is no such thing as "too gay". Reichen confronts Austin about Austin's behaviour while under the influence of alcohol. Ryan fires TJ as his assistant in hopes of salvaging their friendship. He also helps Nyasha audition back-up dancers for her new music video. Austin does a test photo shoot for Playgirl which includes full-frontal nudity and being "fluffed" to achieve an erection. His husband Jake is displeased to hear of this.
3	13	"Bestie Break-up"	August 8, 2011
Derek's potential boyfriend Duncan arrives in town but on a dinner date Derek loses all interest because of Duncan's boorish manners. He later tells his assistant Gina that Austin and Jake came into the restaurant and became fast friends with Duncan. Reichen invites TJ to go with him to Hawaii for a gay event Reichen is hosting. Austin throws a cocktail party to show he can handle his liquor. Derek refuses to attend because Duncan is invited. The next day Derek tells Ryan that he is ending his friendship with Austin because of the betrayal.
4	14	"Unholy Alliances"	August 15, 2011
Derek tries to mend fences with Rodiney and Nyasha after his fallout with Austin. Reichen and TJ travel to Hawaii, where Reichen tries to connect with Mike Manning from The Real World: Washington, D.C.. Ryan advises Austin that he should back off of Derek. Rodiney goes on a date with a woman named Liza, who is surprised when he tells her he's bisexual. Derek performs in a "boylesque" number to promote his new spray tan line.
5	15	"Cattiness on the Catwalk"	August 22, 2011
Rodiney consults a speech coach to try to improve his English. Later he travels to California to shoot a calendar with Mike. Mike is honored for his work on behalf of LGBT homeless youth. Austin pursues his Playgirl opportunity but keeps it from Jake. Reichen and Nyasha get to know each other but Nyasha takes offense at Reichen's advice. Nyasha expresses her attraction to Rodiney but he does not share her feelings. Ryan arranges for the guys and Nyasha to walk in a fashion show for a friend; Derek and Nyasha snipe at Austin backstage but the event goes off.
6	16	"Wig Parties and Threesomes"	August 29, 2011
Nyasha stresses over hiring models for her hair company's launch party. Mike does a photo shoot with Kathy Griffin in Los Angeles. Later he and Martin babysit a friend's children and Martin misses his own children from a previous relationship. Austin and Jake plan to renew their vows but while on a double date with Reichen and a friend of Austin's, Austin's flirting with Reichen leads to an argument with Jake. Nyasha's hair party is a success but a fight with Rodiney leads her to leave her own after-party.
7	17	"Hamptons Hellraising"	September 12, 2011
Several of the guys and Nyasha have a "day of beauty" (meaning botox injections) in anticipation of a function in The Hamptons for the charity God's Love We Deliver. Jake meets with Derek in hopes of convincing him to smooth things over with Austin. Reichen meets with branding consultants to develop a fragrance line which he plans to call "Reichen". After talking it over with Mike, Austin decides not to appear in Playgirl. Rodiney poses for the cover of Instinct magazine and later undergoes a hair transplant to address his receding hairline. At the charity event a tearful Austin begs Derek for forgiveness but Derek refuses him.
8	18	"Lies, Hypocrisy and Marriage Equality"	September 19, 2011
In the days leading up to marriage equality in New York, Jake and Austin look for a venue for their vow renewal while the group trades rumors about their alleged infidelities and physically abusive relationship. Nyasha signs up for an Internet dating site but while on a date with a man she met offline she confides her discomfort with the idea. Reichen informs his mother about his Internet scandal and later throws himself a "half-birthday" party; the group is shocked when Rodiney brings Liza. Mike directs a music video for recording artist Brian Kent and Rodiney appears as an extra. Austin and Derek rehash their relationship again and Derek indicates that he's open to a reconciliation.
9	19	"Tense-sexual Party"	September 26, 2011
Austin and Jake continue to plan their bachelor party in Atlantic City but the group goes back and forth on whether to go, even though they will be in town for Nyasha's live singing debut. Derek looks for retail space for his tanning business and plans a launch party for his line. Mike does a photo shoot with Jessie J and later attends a promotional party for his and Rodiney's calendar. In the run-up to Derek's launch party Austin and Nyasha try to work out their issues but the meeting devolves into a screaming match. This leads Austin to decide not to attend Derek's event. Derek takes this as another betrayal and he, Ryan, Reichen, Rodiney and Nyasha all pledge not to attend Jake and Austin's party.
10	20	"Ultimate Betrayal at the Boardwalk"	October 3, 2011
Mike proposes marriage to Martin, and Martin accepts. Reichen, Rodiney, Ryan and Derek take a spa day in Atlantic City before Nyasha's show. They decide that Reichen and Rodiney will confront Austin about the infidelity rumors. Jake, Austin and two friends arrive in Atlantic City for Jake and Austin's bachelor party. When Reichen and Rodiney confront Austin, he bursts into tears; Reichen and Rodiney say they won't support the relationship but they will support Austin. Nyasha performs her single. Austin and Jake argue about their relationship, culminating in a renewed commitment to each other and the decision to cut the others out of their lives. After finding pictures of the bachelor party online, the others reach the same decision about them.
11	21	"Reunion Part I"	October 10, 2011
Wendy Williams moderates a discussion among the A-Listers. Subjects include Mike's strategy for staying out of the drama, Austin's ongoing conflicts with Nyasha and Derek, whether or not Ryan is "two-faced" and a light-hearted look at Rodiney's "battle" with the English language.
12	22	"Reunion Part II"	October 17, 2011
Wendy Williams moderates the second half of the reunion.

== DVD release ==
Season	Release date	Episodes	Special features	Discs
1	August 17, 2011	10	Never-before-seen footage	4
