= Reichen Lehmkuhl =

American lawyer, businessman, and reality show winner

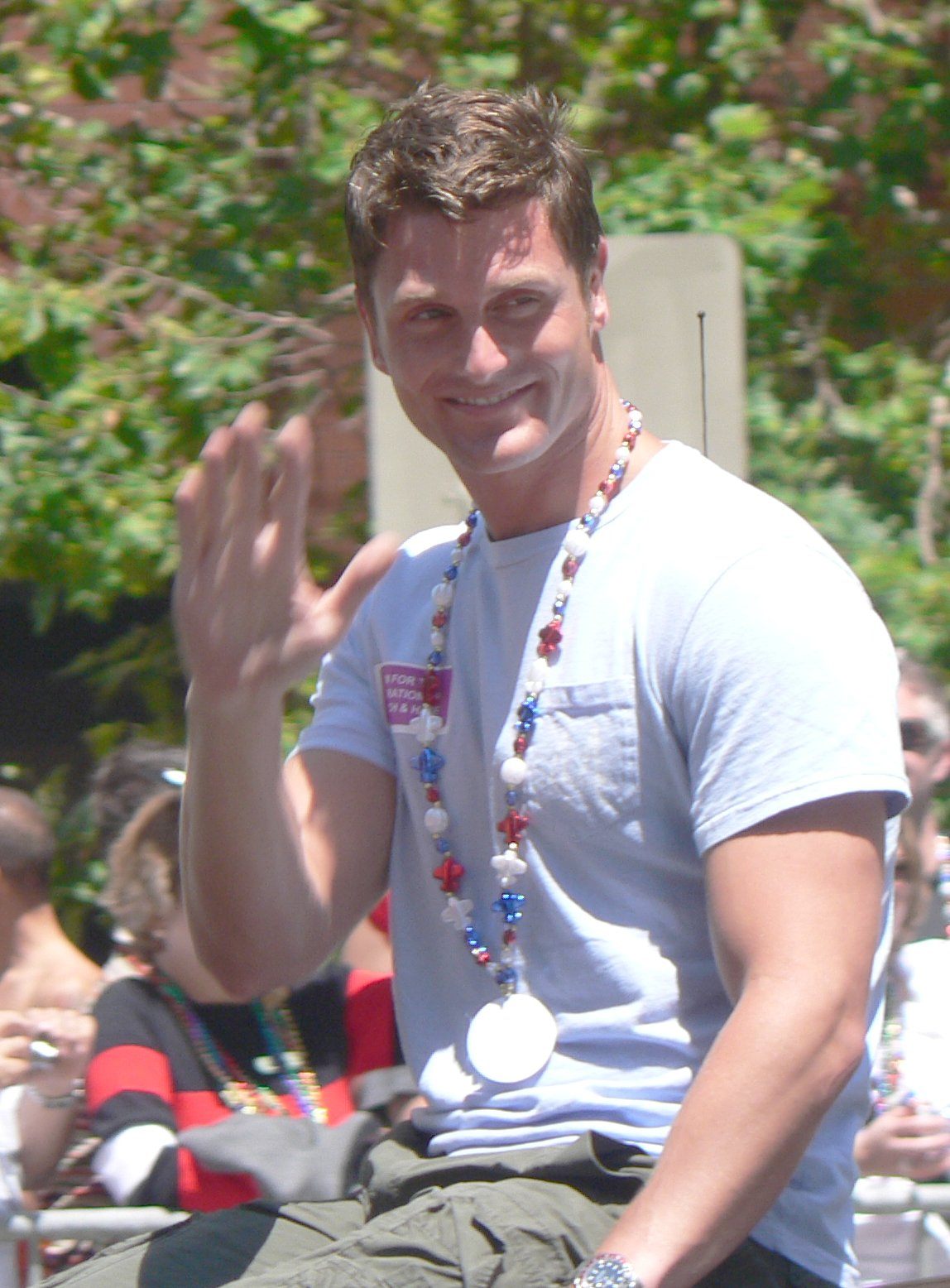
- Reichen Lehmkuhl during the 2006 San Francisco Gay Pride celebration
- Born: Richard Allen Lehmkuhl; December 26, 1973 (age 52); Cincinnati, Ohio, U.S.
- Education: United States Air Force Academy; Loyola Law School
- Occupations: CEO, LeaseLock
- Years active: 1996–present
- Television: The Amazing Race 4 Dante's Cove; The A-List: New York
- Partner(s): Chip Arndt (1999–2003); Lance Bass (2006–2007); Rodiney Santiago (2009–2010); Keith D. Black (2012–2013)

Reichen Lehmkuhl (born Richard Allen Lehmkuhl; December 26, 1973) is an American lawyer, businessman, reality show winner, former model, and former occasional actor. A former United States Air Force officer with the rank of captain, he is best known for winning season four of the reality game show The Amazing Race with his then-partner Chip Arndt, and for his much publicized 2006 relationship with pop singer Lance Bass.

== Early life ==
After Lehmkuhl's parents, a policeman and a nurse, divorced when he was five, his family moved to Norton, Massachusetts, and his mother remarried. Sometime after 2002, he changed his first name legally from Richard to Reichen.

Lehmkuhl graduated from the United States Air Force Academy. He has since advocated for gay rights in the military as a spokesperson for Servicemembers Legal Defense Network.

== The Amazing Race ==
Lehmkuhl was working simultaneously as a physics teacher at Crossroads School for the Arts and Sciences, flight instructor, and model in Los Angeles when he was approached by a casting director for The Amazing Race. Lehmkuhl and Chip Arndt were a couple during the competition but have since split. Lehmkuhl moved to Dallas, Texas briefly after his win on The Amazing Race, but before all episodes had been broadcast. Reichen's spending habits at that time caused speculation that he had won The Amazing Race — and that he and Arndt had broken up. During the show, the couple was typically described as "Married" in the subtitles that are used to illustrate the relationship between team members (other teams being, for example, "Best Friends" or "Father-Daughter").

In January 2003, Lehmkuhl competed on the fourth season of the CBS adventure reality show The Amazing Race with his "husband" Chip Arndt. The two reached the final leg of the race and won the season.

=== The Amazing Race 4 finishes ===
- A green ƒ indicates that Reichen and Chip won the Fast Forward.

Roadblocks performed by Lehmkuhl are bolded.

Episode	Leg	Destination(s)	Detour choice (underlined)	Roadblock performance	Placement	Notes
1	1	United States → Italy	Search/Rescue	No Roadblock	9th of 12	
2	2	Italy	Waterway/Pathway	Chip	2nd of 11	
3	3	Italy → Austria	Mozart/Beethoven	**Reichen**	3rd of 10	
4	4	Austria → France	Ropes/Slopes	Chip	5th of 9	
5	5	France → Netherlands	500 kilograms/15 feet	**Reichen**	4th of 8	
6	6	Netherlands → India	Suds/Duds	Chip	2nd of 7	
7	7	India	Baskets/Trunks	**Reichen**	5th of 6	
8	8	India → Malaysia	Net/Trap	Chip	2nd of 5	
9	9	Malaysia	Used fast forward		1st of 5ƒ	
10	10	Malaysia → South Korea	Strong hands/Strong stomach	Chip	2nd of 4	
11	11	South Korea → Australia	Face first/Feet first	**Reichen**	3rd of 4	(Note: Reichen & Chip initially arrived 2nd, but they drove to the Pit Stop instead of traveling on foot and were issued a 35-minute penalty. During this time, Kelly & Jon checked in, dropping Reichen & Chip to 3rd.)
12	12	Australia	Saddle/Paddle	Chip	2nd of 3	
13	13	Australia → United States	Wing it/Wander it	Chip	1st of 3	

== After The Amazing Race ==
Lehmkuhl had a cameo in an episode of Frasier in September 2003 as "Impossibly Handsome Man" followed by a cameo on The Drew Carey Show.

Lehmkuhl hosted The Reichen Show on Q Television Network until Q Television ceased operations in May 2006.

His autobiography, Here's What We'll Say, about his time in the Air Force under the military's official "Don't ask, don't tell" policy, was released by Carroll and Graf on October 28, 2006.

He published a beefcake calendar for several years and has appeared on sitcoms, soap operas, and other reality television shows.

On May 1, 2007, the LGBT-interest television network here! announced that Lehmkuhl had joined the cast for the third season of its original gothic soap opera, Dante's Cove. He plays the role of Trevor, originally described as "a business school graduate who comes to Dante's Cove looking to find himself."

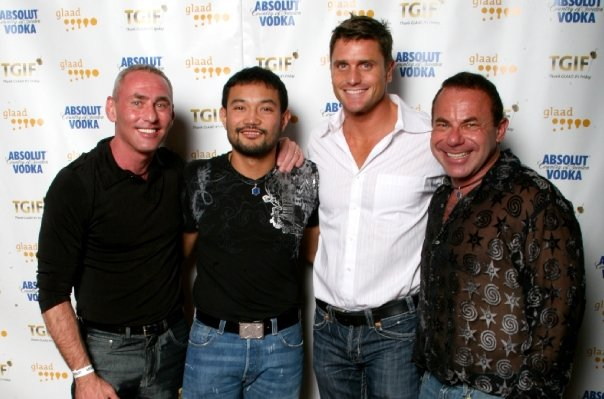
(L-R) Don Norte, friend, Lehmkuhl, Kevin Norte at GLAAD's annual Summer West Hollywood

Lehmkuhl starred in My Big Gay Italian Wedding, an off-Broadway production from its opening May 5, 2010, in New York City to July 24, 2010. A percentage of ticket sales promoted legalization of same-sex marriages in the US through Broadway Impact.

LGBT-interest network Logo announced on June 3, 2010, that Lehmkuhl and boyfriend, model Rodiney Santiago had joined the cast of Logo's reality series, The A-List: New York. The series was cancelled after two seasons. Since the airing, Lehmkuhl and Santiago are no longer a couple.

He released an album, Up to the Sky, in 2010. He also founded a company LeaseLock.com.

== Personal life ==
In July 2006, former NSYNC band member Lance Bass told People that he is gay and in a "very stable relationship" with Lehmkuhl. The couple broke up in January 2007. Bass said they remained "good friends".
