= The A-List: Dallas =

- Promotional image of the cast
- Genre: Reality
- Starring: Levi Crocker; James Doyle; Chase Hutchinson; Ashley Kelly; Philip Willis; Taylor Garrett
- Opening theme: "A Boy Like Me" by Kaden James
- Country of origin: United States
- Original language: English
- No. of seasons: 1
- No. of episodes: 11

Production
- Executive producers: Steven Weinstock; Glenda Hersh
- Production locations: Dallas, Texas
- Production company: True Entertainment

Original release
- Network: Logo
- Release: October 10 – December 19, 2011

Related
- The A-List: New York

The A-List: Dallas is an American reality television series that aired on Logo in 2011. The series, the second entry in Logo's The A-List franchise after The A-List: New York, follows the lives of several gay men and one woman as they traverse the gay scene of Dallas, Texas. The series premiered on October 10, 2011, airing through December 19, 2011. In June 2012, Logo announced the series was canceled along with The A-List: New York.

== Production ==
Logo announced on April 18, 2010, that it was expanding its A-List franchise. Casting for The A-List: Dallas began in November 2010. In April 2011, the network announced that it had ordered eleven episodes for the first season. The series was produced by True Entertainment, with Steven Weinstock and Glenda Hersh serving as executive producers.

== Cast ==
- Levi Crocker, a fashion designer and former rodeo performer
- James Doyle, a self-described "trust fund baby"
- Chase Hutchinson, a real estate/equity investments broker
- Ashley Kelly, a photographer and the show's only female cast member
- Philip Willis, a fashion stylist
- Taylor Garrett, a Republican lobbyist

== Episodes ==
| No. | Title | Original release date |
|---|---|---|
| 1 | "The Higher the Hair, the Closer to Jesus" | October 10, 2011 |
| 2 | "Mark My Words" | October 17, 2011 |
| 3 | "Revenge and Karma's a Bitch" | October 24, 2011 |
| 4 | "How Do You Measure Up?" | October 31, 2011 |
| 5 | "That's Illegal In Texas" | November 7, 2011 |
| 6 | "Get Out From Under My Boot!" | November 14, 2011 |
| 7 | "BatCrazy" | November 21, 2011 |
| 8 | "Horseplay" | November 28, 2011 |
| 9 | "Forgive My Vengeful Ways" | December 5, 2011 |
| 10 | "Showdown At The Rodeo" | December 12, 2011 |
| 11 | "Reunion" | December 19, 2011 |

== Controversy ==
It was reported that political commentator Ann Coulter would make a guest appearance on the series. The announcement generated some controversy because of Coulter's expressed views on homosexuality.

On October 7, 2011, cast member Taylor Garrett announced via Twitter that his home had been vandalized, tweeting "My place is nice and breezy now thanks to a liberal!" along with a picture of a broken window. Reportedly a rock bearing a note calling Garrett "Z list" and "an embarrassment to the gay community" was thrown through a window of his Dallas-area home. LGBT bloggers became suspicious of the story, noting that apparently no police report had been filed and that series executive producer John Hill tweeted Garrett after the incident was reported in The Huffington Post congratulating him for generating headlines. Garrett and Logo did not immediately respond to questions about the incident, leading to suspicion that Garrett and/or someone associated with the series or the network faked the incident. Garrett denied any involvement, stating that he was out of town when the incident occurred and that he didn't initially file a police report because his building manager had already filed one. He provided copies of both reports to The Huffington Post.

== See also ==
- LGBT culture in Dallas–Fort Worth
