= Mario Godiva =

American exercise instructor

- Born: May 30, 1982 (age 43); Kenosha, Wisconsin, U.S.
- Occupation: Fitness expert
- Website: MarioGodiva.com

Mario Godiva (born May 30, 1982) is a fitness expert, food coach, and media spokesperson who has appeared on The Tyra Banks Show, The Steve Harvey Show, The New York Times, The Today Show, ABC News, Weekend Today, Nightline, BET: Business Today, Time Out, New York, W Magazine, New York Daily News, and many other local and state publications.

== Early life ==
Mario Godiva grew up in Kenosha, Wisconsin and struggled with childhood obesity. After the loss of his mother at a young age, Godiva realized the epidemic of obesity, high blood pressure and diabetes afflicting the African American community. Godiva began to exercise so that he could lose weight and live a long and healthy life.

He attended the University of Wisconsin-Stevens Point. While studying, Godiva began teaching dance and aerobics classes and encouraging others to live healthier lives through exercise.

== Career ==
After graduation, Godiva moved to Chicago, Illinois and became an aerobics instructor and a personal trainer. He moved to New York City and became a celebrity personal trainer and has worked with Jillian Michaels, Vanessa Marcil-Giovanazzo, Lauren Holly, the cast of The A-List: New York, Wicked Fit, and JaQuin Allen of The Biggest Loser and others.

Godiva was first introduced to Kangoo Jumps at a fitness expo in 2008. He worked as a national spokesperson for Kangoo Jumps, introducing them to a larger audience. Mario now works for Equinox Fitness, creating WERK and RIDE.

Mario Godiva Green works to find innovative ways to encourage people to lose weight and live healthy lives. He develops effective exercises for people with all types of health issues, from chronic knee pain to scoliosis and has helped people shed hundreds of pounds. Godiva worked with Diapers.com and Soap.com to create a The Biggest Loser-style competition and wellness initiative to encourage staff members to lose weight. With Godiva's help, the company collectively lost more than the goal of 1,000 lbs. His success has been attributed to his personality, for which he has been described as a "strongly charismatic leader with a big heart and a tower of strength to those he touches with his message and support".

Godiva is a stage IV cancer survivor.
