= Ellis Beach, Queensland =

Ellis Beach
- Suburb
- Ellis Beach – view south to Buchan Point

- Interactive map of Ellis Beach
- Coordinates: 16.7261°S 145.6725°E
- Country: Australia
- State: Queensland
- LGA: Cairns Region
- Location: 11.3 km (7.0 mi) NNW of Trinity Beach; 14.4 km (8.9 mi) NNW of Smithfield; 28 km (17 mi) NNW of Cairns CBD; 1,726 km (1,072 mi) NNW of Brisbane

Government
  - State electorate: Barron River
  - Federal division: Leichhardt

Area
  - Total: 13.3 km^{2} (5.1 sq mi)

Population
  - Total: 5 (2021 census)
  - Density: 0.38/km^{2} (0.97/sq mi)
- Time zone: UTC+10:00 (AEST)
- Postcode: 4879
Suburbs around Ellis Beach
Macalister Range	Macalister Range	Coral Sea
Macalister Range	Ellis Beach	Coral Sea
Macalister Range	Palm Cove	Coral Sea

Ellis Beach is a coastal locality in the Cairns Region, Queensland, Australia. In the 2021 census, Ellis Beach had a population of 5 people.

== Geography ==
Ellis Beach, looking to the north

The five-kilometre strip of Ellis Beach is located along the Coral Sea 20 kilometres (12 mi) north of Cairns on the Captain Cook Highway between Cairns and Port Douglas, within the Cairns Region local government area. The Ellis Beach locality extends into the Coral Sea and includes the off-shore islands:

- Double Island (16.7256°S 145.6835°E)
- Haycock Island (16.7313°S 145.6942°E)

== History ==
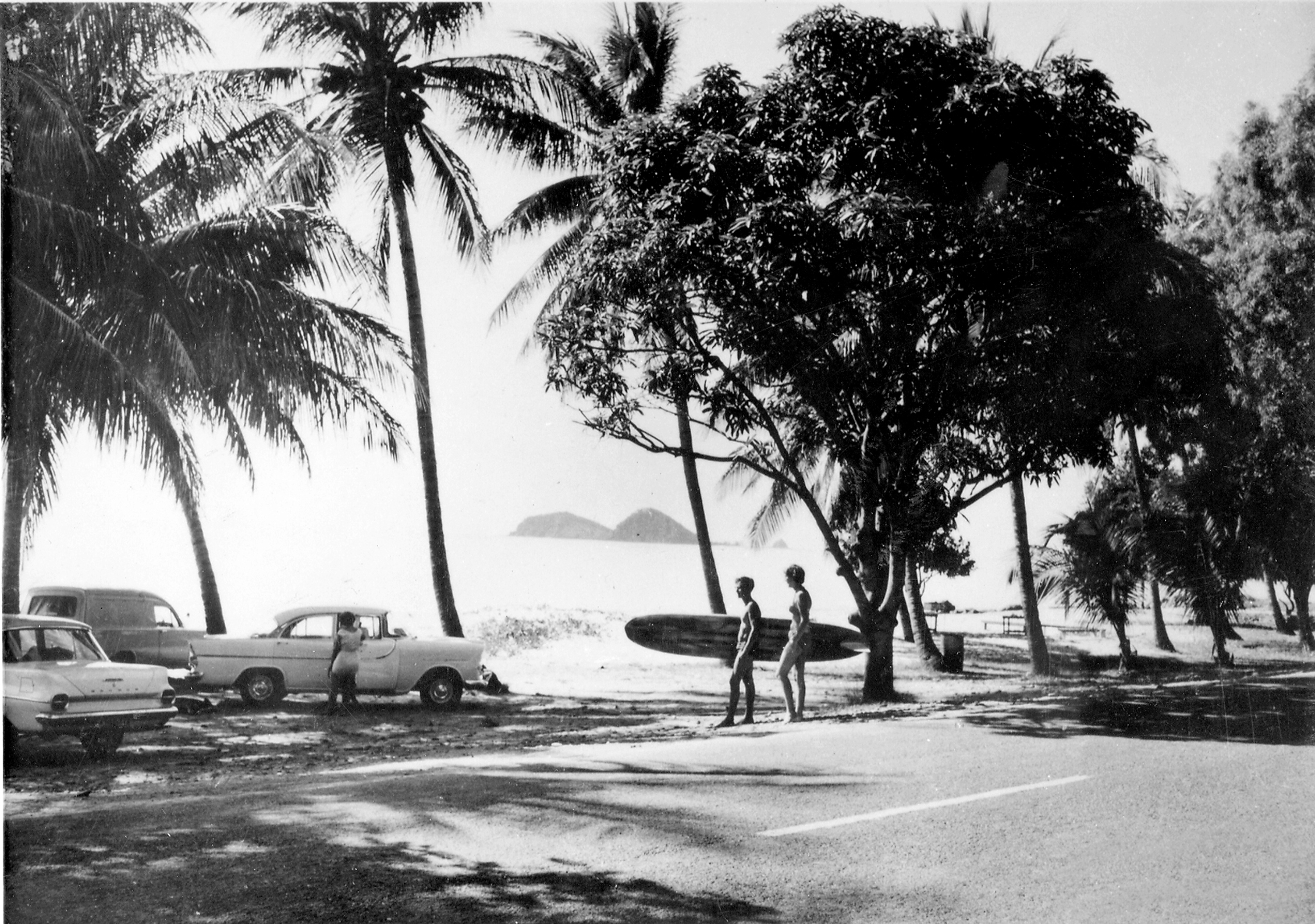
Surfers at Ellis Beach, 1965

Ellis Beach is situated in the Djabugay (Tjapukai) traditional Aboriginal country.

Double Island was developed as a luxury resort but has fallen into disrepair. As the island is leased by the Queensland Government to the resort operator, in 2023 there have been calls to the government to revoke the lease. In June 2024, Wu's lease was revoked and the island was returned to the state of Queensland.

== Demographics ==
In the 2006 census, Ellis Beach had a population of 30 people.

In the 2016 census, Ellis Beach had a population of 24 people.

In the 2021 census, Ellis Beach had a population of 5 people.

== Education ==
There are no schools in Ellis Beach. The nearest government primary school is Trinity Beach State School in Trinity Beach to the south. The nearest government secondary school is Smithfield State High School in Smithfield to the south.

== Amenities ==
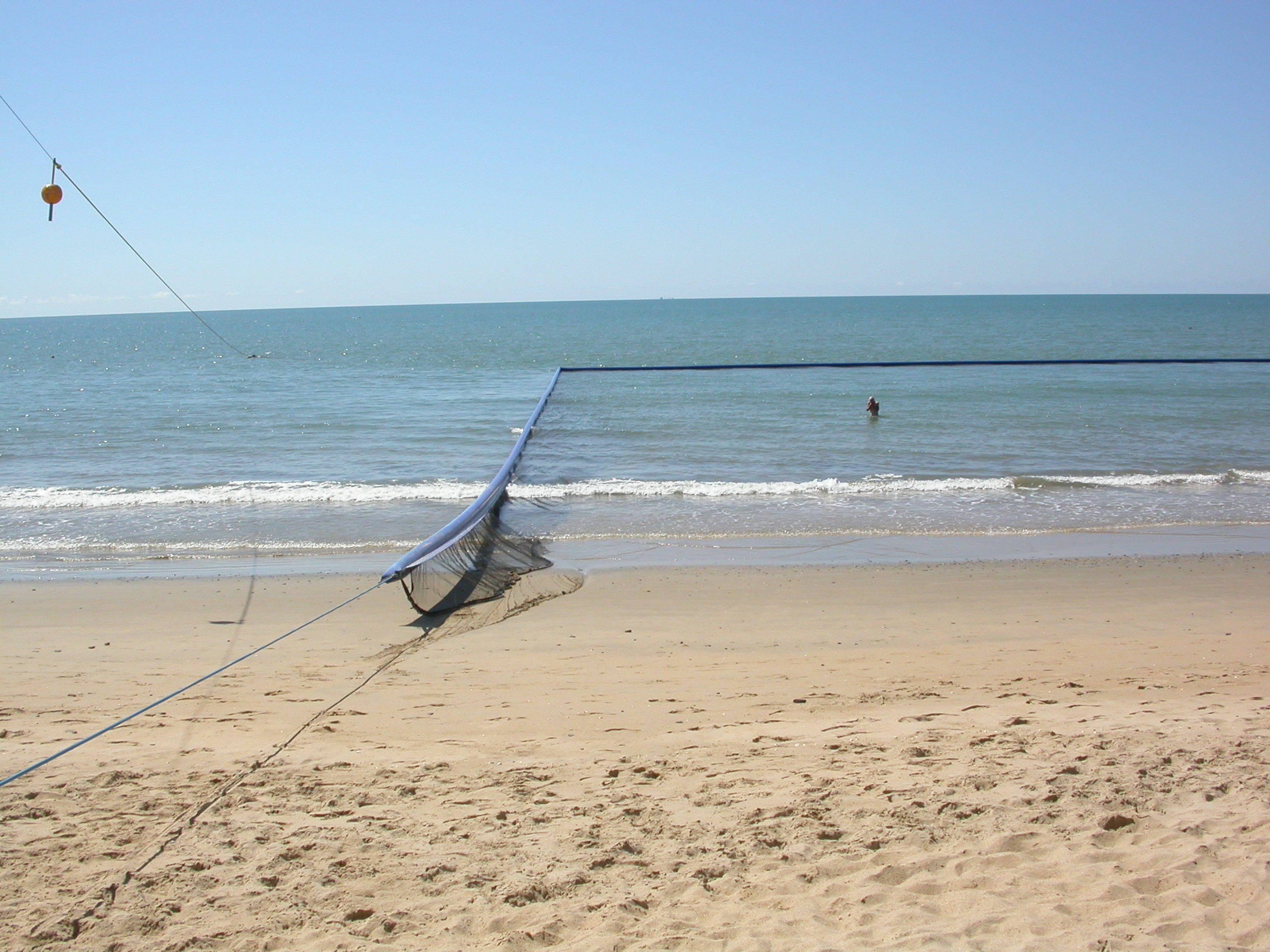
Jellyfish enclosure at Ellis Beach

Ellis Beach is also home to the Ellis Beach Surf Lifesaving Club which regularly hosts competitions and events. From November to May, a stinger net patrolled by the club helps protect swimmers from marine "stingers" (jellyfish species of Chironex and Irukandji) which inhabit the waters during those months. Ellis Beach features pumice stones along its shores.

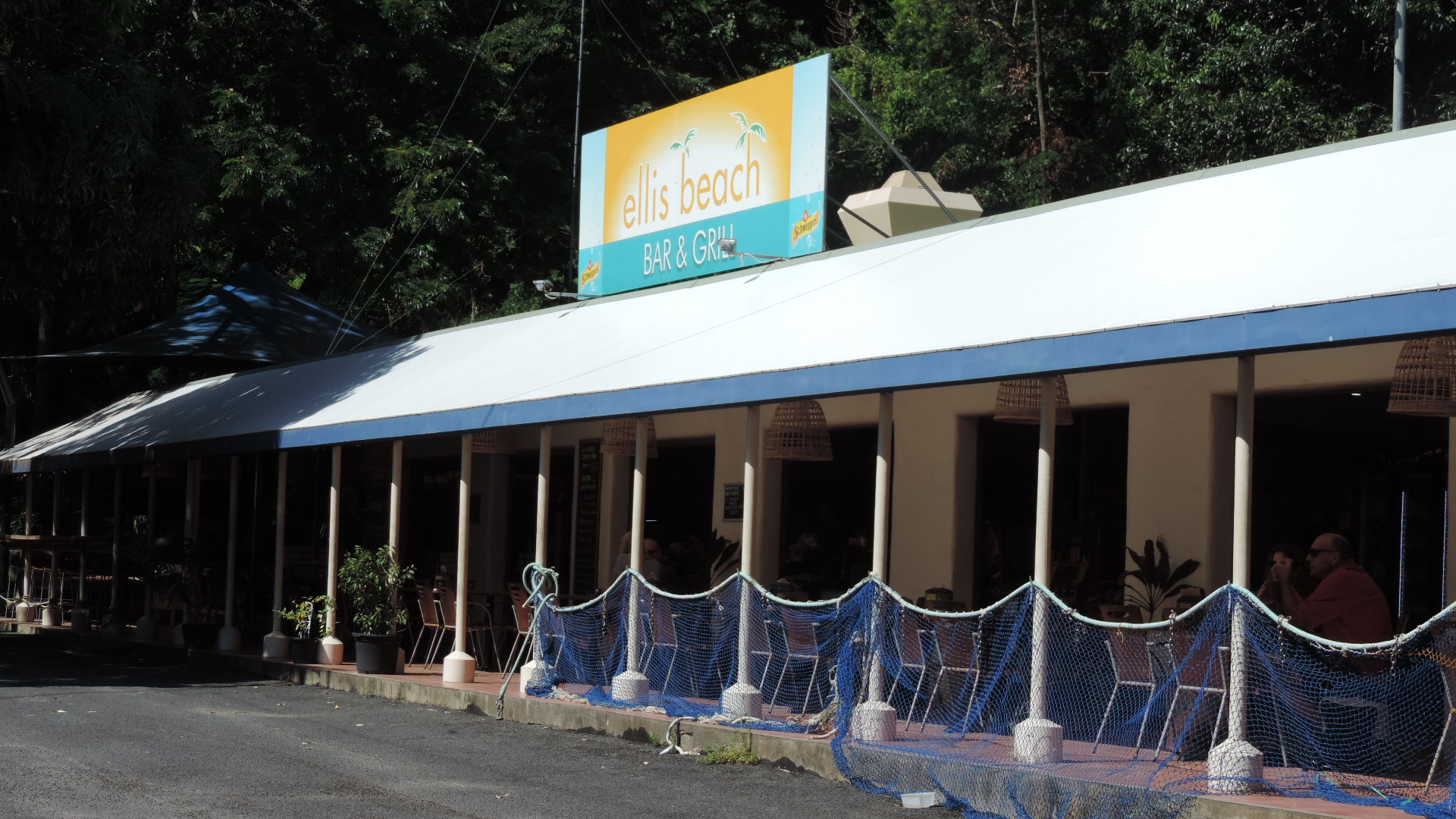
Ellis Beach Bar & Grill, 2018

There is a camping ground and a bar and grill restaurant.

== Facilities ==
Buchan Point SES Facility is on the western side of the Captain Cook Highway (16.7395°S 145.6619°E).

== In popular culture ==
Ellis Beach was featured in the fourth season of The Amazing Race.
