= Double Island, Queensland =

Island in Queensland, Australia

Double Island
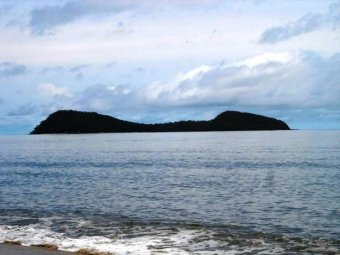
- View of Double Island from shore, 2005
- Interactive map of Double Island

Geography
- Location: Ellis Beach, Queensland
- Coordinates: 16.7258°S 145.6836°E

Administration
- Australia

Double Island is an island approximately 3 kilometres (1.9 mi) off Ellis Beach, inside the Great Barrier Reef on the coast of Queensland, Australia.

== Geography ==
The island lies approximately 1.5 km north-east of Palm Cove, Queensland, and about 30 km north of Cairns.

== History ==
The discovery of gold on the mainland west of the area made Double Island well-known in the 1880s and 1890s. Supposedly, a mining company at Irvinebank used the island around that time as a resort for its employees.

In 1956, bushman Michael 'Tarzan' Fomenko (c.1930–2018) anchored his dugout canoe off the south side of the island on his intended journey from Deeral to Cooktown.

Double Island is the site of a now-derelict exclusive resort. Hollywood stars Jennifer Aniston, Brad Pitt and Keanu Reeves were among the celebrities who stayed on there.

In 2012, Benny Wu from Hong Kong bought the lease of the island and planned a $10 million upgrade to the resort to attract wealthy tourists. However, by 2023, no maintenance or upgrades had been performed. With the resort having fallen into disrepair, there were calls for the lease to be cancelled. In June 2024, Wu's lease was revoked and the island was returned to the state of Queensland.
