= The Amazing Race 4 =

Season of television series

- Season 4
- Region 1 DVD cover
- Presented by: Phil Keoghan
- No. of teams: 12
- Winners: Reichen Lehmkuhl and Chip Arndt
- No. of legs: 13
- Distance traveled: 44,000 mi (71,000 km)
- No. of episodes: 13

Release
- Original network: CBS
- Original release: May 29 – August 21, 2003

Additional information
- Filming dates: January 18 – February 14, 2003

Series chronology
- ← Previous; Season 3 Next → Season 5

The Amazing Race 4 is the fourth season of the American reality competition show The Amazing Race. Hosted by Phil Keoghan, it featured twelve teams of two, each with a pre-existing relationship, competing in a race around the world. This season visited four continents and nine countries, traveling approximately 44,000 miles (71,000 km) over thirteen legs. Filming took place from January 18 to February 14, 2003. Starting in Los Angeles, racers traveled through Italy, Austria, France, the Netherlands, India, Malaysia, South Korea, and Australia, before returning to the United States, traveling through Hawaii, and finishing in Phoenix. The season premiered on CBS on May 29, 2003, and concluded on August 21, 2003.

Married couple Reichen Lehmkuhl and Chip Arndt were the winners of the season, while engaged couple Jon Corso and Kelly Parks finished in second place, and best friends David Dean and Jeff Strand finished in third place.

== Format ==
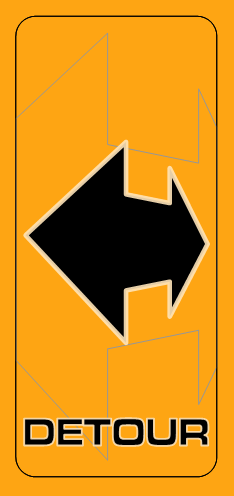
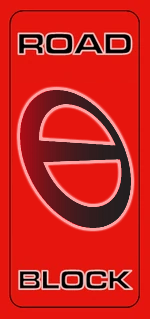
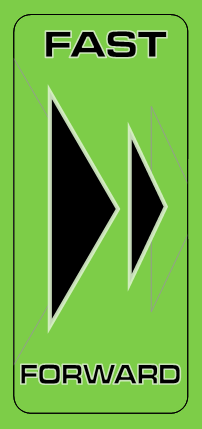
The clues which contestants receive during the course of the race generally fall into four categories: Route Info, Detour, Roadblock, and Fast Forward.

The Amazing Race is a reality television show created by Bertram van Munster and Elise Doganieri, and hosted by Phil Keoghan. The series follows teams of two competing in a race around the world. Each leg of the race requires teams to deduce clues, navigate foreign environments, interact with locals, perform physical and mental challenges, and travel on a limited budget provided by the show. At each stop during the leg, teams receive clues inside sealed envelopes, which fall into one of these categories:

- Route Info: These are simple instructions that teams must follow before they can receive their next clue.
- Detour: A Detour is a choice between two tasks. Teams may choose either task and switch tasks if they find one option too difficult. There is usually one Detour present on each leg.
- Roadblock: A Roadblock is a task that only one team member can complete. Teams must choose which member will complete the task based on a brief clue they receive before fully learning the details of the task. There is usually one Roadblock present on each leg.
- Fast Forward: A Fast Forward is a task that only one team may complete, which allows that team to skip all remaining tasks on the leg and go directly to the next Pit Stop. Teams may only claim one Fast Forward during the entire race.

Most teams who arrive last at the Pit Stop of each leg are progressively eliminated, while the first team to arrive at the finish line in the final episode wins the grand prize of US$1,000,000.

== Production ==
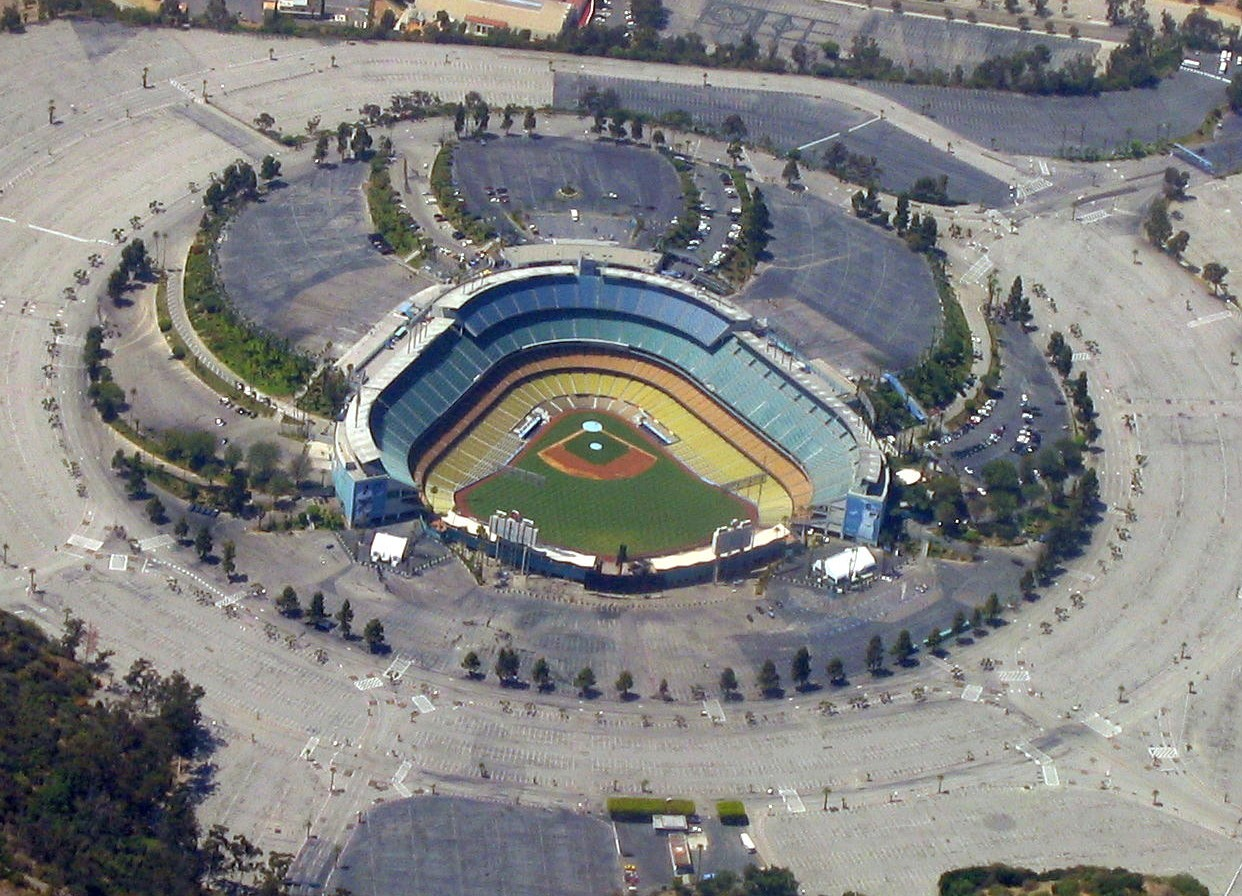
The starting line was on the grounds of Dodger Stadium in Los Angeles, California.

The fourth season of The Amazing Race spanned 44,000 miles (71,000 km) across four continents and nine countries, two of which were new to the series: the Netherlands and South Korea. Casting for this season began in August 2002. Filming for the show began on January 18, 2003, and finished on February 14.

== Contestants ==
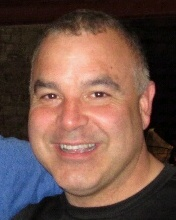
Al Rios

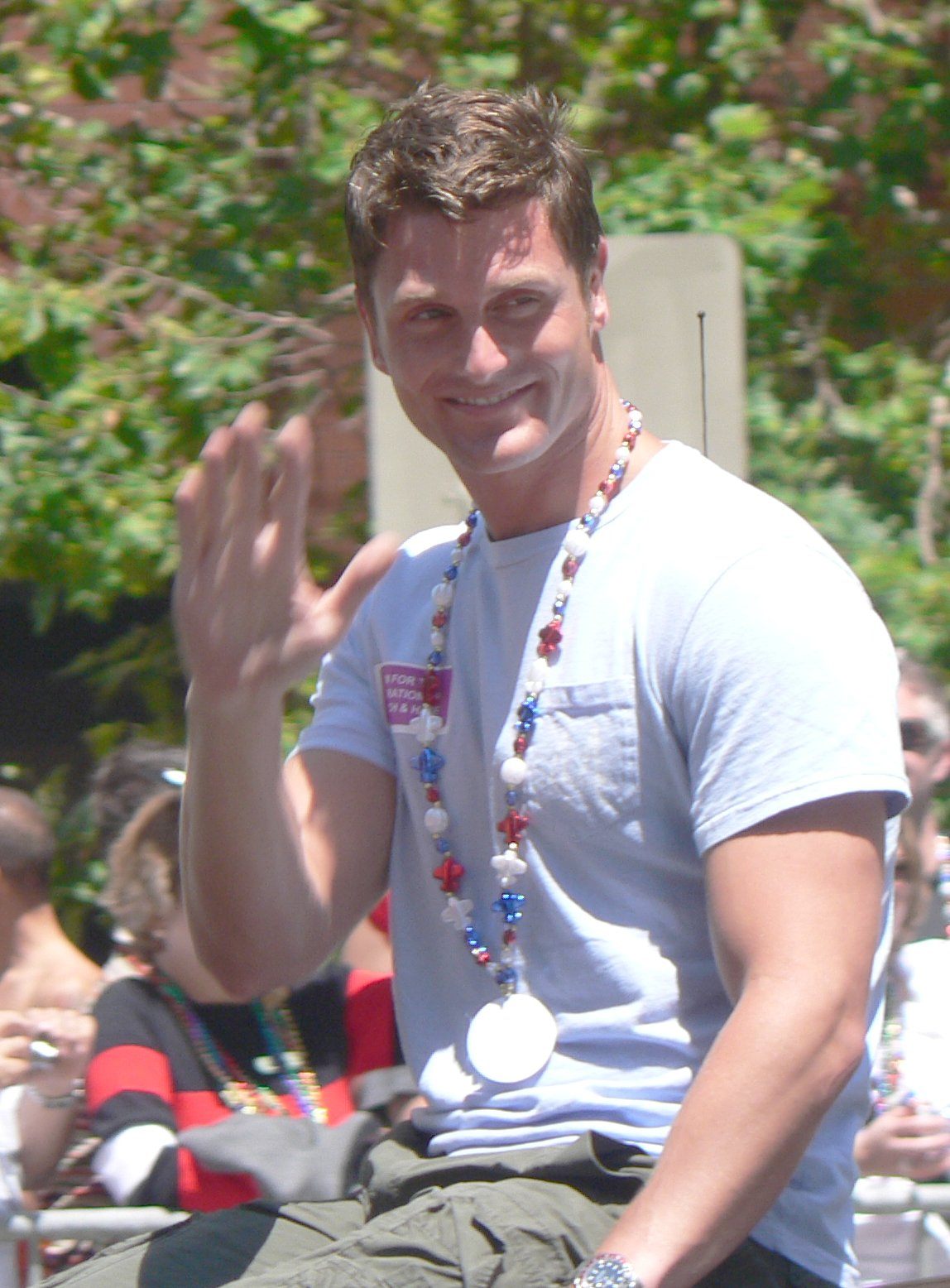
Reichen Lehmkuhl

The cast of The Amazing Race 4 included twelve teams. Monica Ambrose and Sheree Buchanan were married to Ashley Ambrose and Ray Buchanan, respectively, who both played for the Atlanta Falcons the season before the television series was filmed. When this season was filmed and broadcast, same-sex marriage had not yet been legalized in the United States. Reichen and Chip were never legally married, although they were married in a religious ceremony. CBS decided for the purpose of the show to respect the fact that they recognized themselves as a married couple. Not long after the season ended, Reichen revealed that he and Chip had separated.

Contestants	Age	Relationship	Hometown	Status
Debra Carmody	49	Married Parents	Louisville, Kentucky	Eliminated 1st (in Cortina d'Ampezzo, Italy)
Steve Carmody	40	Married Parents	Louisville, Kentucky	Eliminated 1st (in Cortina d'Ampezzo, Italy)
Amanda Adams	25	Dating	Sioux Falls, South Dakota	Eliminated 2nd (in Venice, Italy)
Chris Garry	28	Dating	Sioux Falls, South Dakota	Eliminated 2nd (in Venice, Italy)
Russell Brown	32	Friends & Dating	Hermosa Beach, California	Eliminated 3rd (in Gmunden, Austria)
Cindy Duck	39	Friends & Dating	Los Angeles, California	Eliminated 3rd (in Gmunden, Austria)
Steve Cottingham	47	Father & Son	Santa Barbara, California	Eliminated 4th (in Saint-Rémy-de-Provence, France)
Josh Cottingham	21	Father & Son	Los Angeles, California	Eliminated 4th (in Saint-Rémy-de-Provence, France)
Steve Meitz	46	Air Traffic Controllers	Chicago, Illinois	Eliminated 5th (in Muiden, Netherlands)
Dave Cottingham	43	Air Traffic Controllers	Chicago, Illinois	Eliminated 5th (in Muiden, Netherlands)
Monica Ambrose	29	NFL Wives & Moms	Duluth, Georgia	Eliminated 6th (in Mumbai, India)
Sheree Buchanan	31	NFL Wives & Moms	Duluth, Georgia	Eliminated 6th (in Mumbai, India)
Tian Kitchen	30	Friends & Models	Miami, Florida	Eliminated 7th (in Alleppey, India)
Jaree Poteet	33	Friends & Models	Miami, Florida	Eliminated 7th (in Alleppey, India)
Millie Smith	29	Dating 12 Years & Virgins	Chattanooga, Tennessee	Eliminated 8th (in Sepilok, Malaysia)
Chuck Shankles	28	Dating 12 Years & Virgins	Chattanooga, Tennessee	Eliminated 8th (in Sepilok, Malaysia)
Jon Weiss	40	Best Friends & Clowns	Long Island, New York	Eliminated 9th (in Mooloolaba, Australia)
Al Rios	34	Best Friends & Clowns	Long Island, New York	Eliminated 9th (in Mooloolaba, Australia)
David Dean	32	Best Friends	Los Angeles, California	Third place
Jeff Strand	37	Best Friends	Los Angeles, California	Third place
Kelly Parks	30	Engaged	Miami, Florida	Runners-up
Jon Corso	28	Engaged	Miami, Florida	Runners-up
Reichen Lehmkuhl	28	Married	Los Angeles, California	Winners
Chip Arndt	36	Married	Los Angeles, California	Winners

Future appearances

In 2005, Reichen Lehmkuhl appeared on a "Reality All-Stars" episode of Fear Factor. Reichen also appeared as part of the cast of The A-List: New York in 2011. Monica and Sheree, now both divorced, appeared on Atlanta Exes in 2014.

== Results ==
The following teams are listed with their placements in each episode. Placements are listed in finishing order.

- A red placement with a dagger (†) indicates that the team was eliminated.
- An underlined blue placement with a double-dagger (‡) indicates that the team was the last to arrive at a Pit Stop in a non-elimination leg.
- A green ƒ indicates that the team won the Fast Forward.

Team placement (by leg)
Team	1	2	3	4	5	6	7	8	9	10	11	12	13
Reichen & Chip	9th	2nd	3rd	5th	4th	2nd	5th	2nd	1stƒ	2nd	3rd (Note: Reichen and Chip initially arrived 2nd, but were issued a 35-minute penalty because they had driven to the Pit Stop instead of traveling on foot as the clue had instructed. Kelly and Jon checked in during this penalty time, dropping Reichen and Chip to 3rd.)	2nd	1st
Kelly & Jon	6th	3rd	8th	7th	3rd	3rd	3rd	5th‡	4th	1st	2nd	3rd‡	2nd
David & Jeff	10th	5th	7th	6th	6th	1st	1st	4th	3rd	4th‡	1stƒ	1st	3rd
Jon & Al	7th	6th	6th	2nd (Note: Jon and Al, and Millie and Chuck, tied for 2nd place after both teams stepped on the Pit Stop mat at the same time.)	2nd	6th	2nd	1st	2nd	3rd	4th†		
Millie & Chuck	1st (Note: Amanda and Chris; Millie and Chuck; and Steve and Josh all tied for 1st place after the three teams stepped on the Pit Stop mat at the same time.)	8th	5th	2nd	1stƒ	4th	4th	3rd	5th†				
Tian & Jaree	11th	4th	4th	1stƒ	7th	5th	6th†						
Monica & Sheree	4thƒ	10th	2nd	4th	5th	7th†							
Steve & Dave	5th	1stƒ	9th	8th	8th†								
Steve & Josh	1st	9th	1stƒ	9th†									
Russell & Cindy	8th	7th	10th†										
Amanda & Chris	1st	11th†											
Debra & Steve	12th†												

== Race summary ==
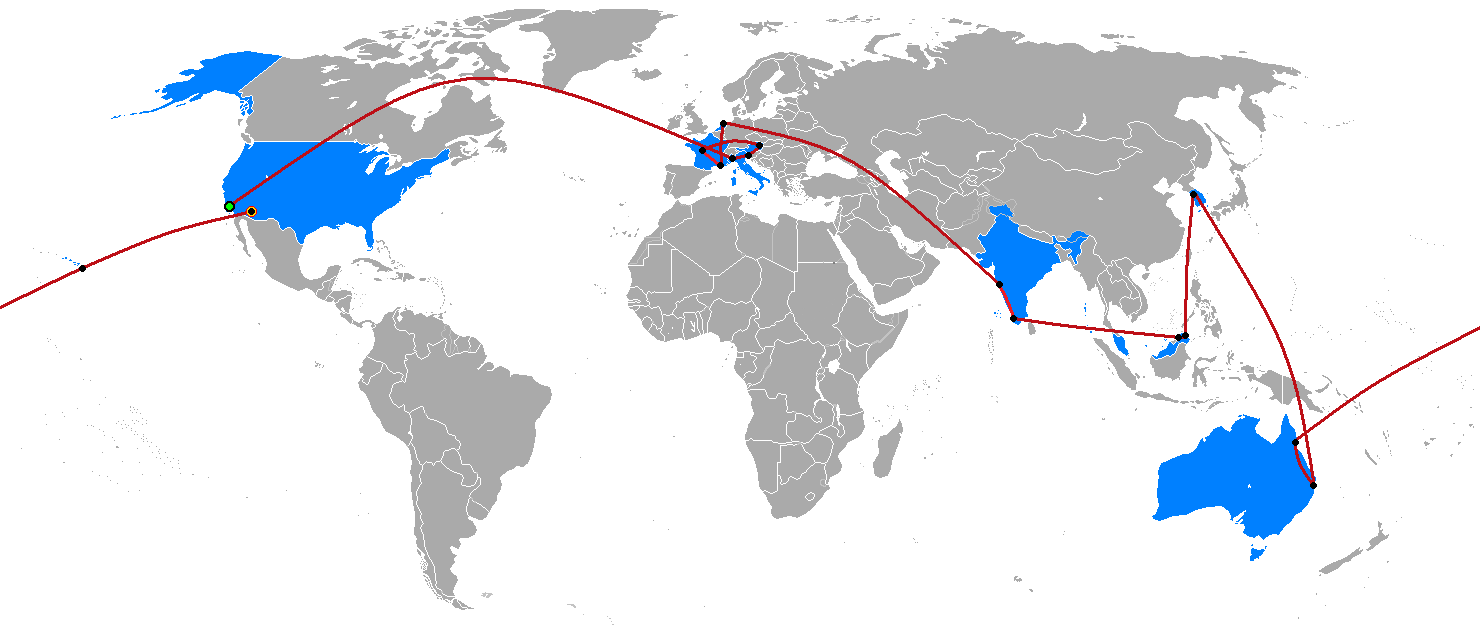
The route of The Amazing Race 4.

Destinations	Air travel Rail travel Water travel Bus travel Helicopter travel Bicycle travel Gondola travel
Route Markers	Detour Roadblock Fast Forward Pit Stop

=== Leg 1 (United States → Italy) ===
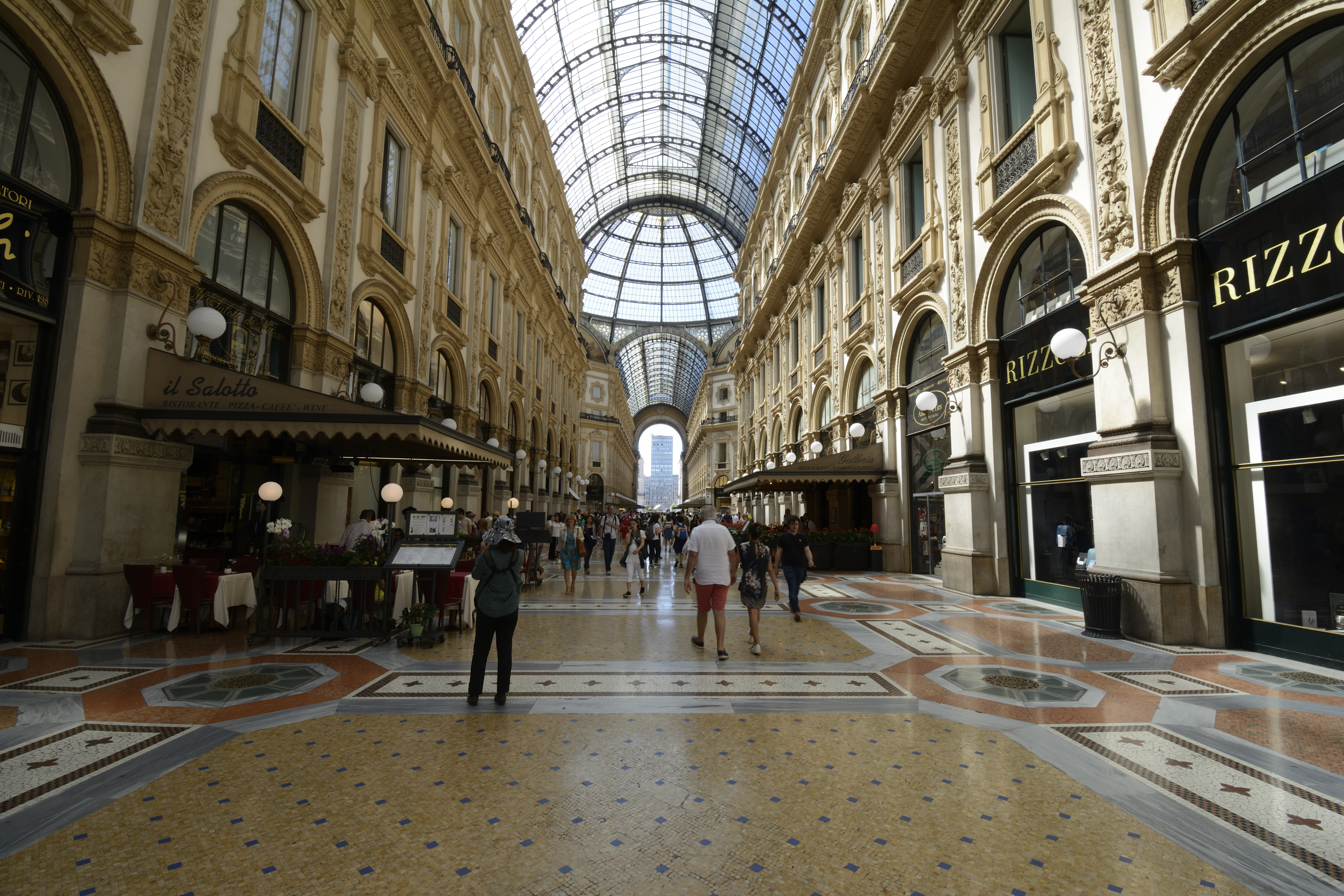
The teams' first stop in Milan was the Galleria Vittorio Emanuele II.

- Episode 1: "Cheaters Never Win... and They Cheated!" (May 29, 2003)
- Prize: A trip to Hawaii (awarded to Amanda and Chris; Millie and Chuck; and Steve and Josh)
- Eliminated: Debra and Steve

Locations

- Los Angeles, California (Dodger Stadium) (Starting Line)
- Los Angeles → Milan, Italy
- Milan (Galleria Vittorio Emanuele II)
- Milan (Piazza Fontana) → Cortina d'Ampezzo (Church of St. Filippo and Giacomo)
- Colle Santa Lucia (Passo Giau)
- Cortina d'Ampezzo (Cinque Torri)
- Cortina d'Ampezzo (Hotel Lajadira)

Episode summary

- Teams set off from Dodger Stadium with instructions to fly to Milan, Italy, on one of three flights. Once there, teams had to travel to the Galleria Vittorio Emanuele II, where they had to search the complex for tickets on one of three charter buses leaving the next day for an unknown destination (Cortina d'Ampezzo in the Dolomite Mountains). Once at the Church of St. Filippo and Giacomo, teams found their next clue, which directed them to the Cinque Torri. There, teams had to ride a chairlift to the top and find their next clue on the mountain.
- This season's first Fast Forward required one team to travel to Passo Giau, put on snowshoes, and trek to the top of a snowy hill. Monica and Sheree won the Fast Forward.
- This season's first Detour was a choice between Search or Rescue. In Search, teams would have used a locator beacon to find a beeper hidden in the snow with a set of keys for a snowmobile that they could have driven to their next clue. In Rescue, teams crossed a traditional alpine rescue bridge of four steel cables. They then had to use a zipline to travel across the ravine to their next clue. All teams chose Rescue.
- After the Detour, teams had to ride the chairlift back down the mountain and then travel to the Pit Stop: the Hotel Lajadira.

=== Leg 2 (Italy) ===
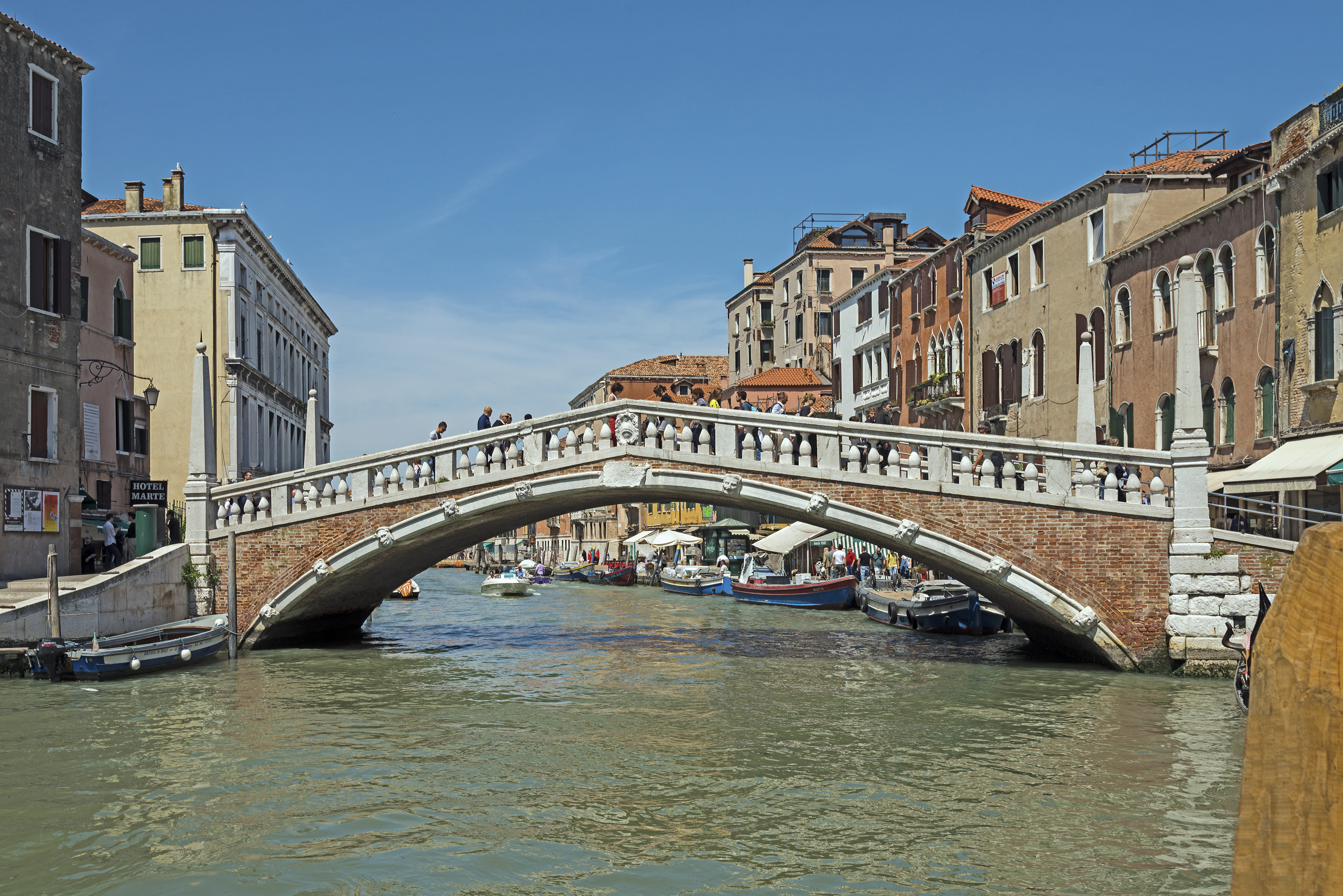
The Ponte delle Guglie in Venice was the starting point of this leg's Detour.

- Episode 2: "It Doesn't Say Anything About First Come First Served... and We're Bigger" (June 5, 2003)
- Eliminated: Amanda and Chris

Locations

- Cortina d'Ampezzo (Hotel Lajadira)
- Cortina d'Ampezzo (Trampolino Olimpico)
- Calalzo di Cadore or Ponte nelle Alpi → Venice
- Venice (Ponte delle Guglie → Campo Querini Stampalia)
- Venice (Campo San Vio)
- Venice (Palazzo da Mosto)
- Venice (Venetian Lagoon – Citta di Padova)

Episode summary

- At the start of this leg, teams traveled to the Trampolino Olimpico. There, they rode an inflatable snow raft down the hill to receive their next clue, which instructed them to travel by train to Venice. Once there, teams had to find their next clue at the Ponte delle Guglie.
- This leg's Detour was a choice between Waterway or Pathway. In Waterway, teams had to travel by gondola, using only a map to guide their gondolier, to the Campo Querini Stampalia, where they found their next clue. In Pathway, teams had to travel by foot through the city's streets and bridges to the same plaza, but without a map, although they could ask for directions.
- This leg's Fast Forward required one team to go to Campo San Vio and join a troupe of actors performing street theater known as commedia dell'arte until the Fast Forward award appeared in the skit. Steve and Dave won the Fast Forward.
- After the Detour, teams had to travel to the Palazzo da Mosto and wait for a masquerade ball to begin before receiving their next clue.
- In this season's first Roadblock, one team member had to choose a picture of a Venetian mask, enter the Palazzo da Mosto, and search the rooms filled with masked revelers to find the one wearing the same mask shown in their photo, who gave them their next clue. If they chose incorrectly, the reveler took the photo and walked away, and the racer had to go back outside to wait to receive another photo, since only four contestants could enter the palace at a time.
- After the Roadblock, teams had to check in at the Pit Stop: the Citta di Padova, moored at the Venetian Lagoon.

=== Leg 3 (Italy → Austria) ===
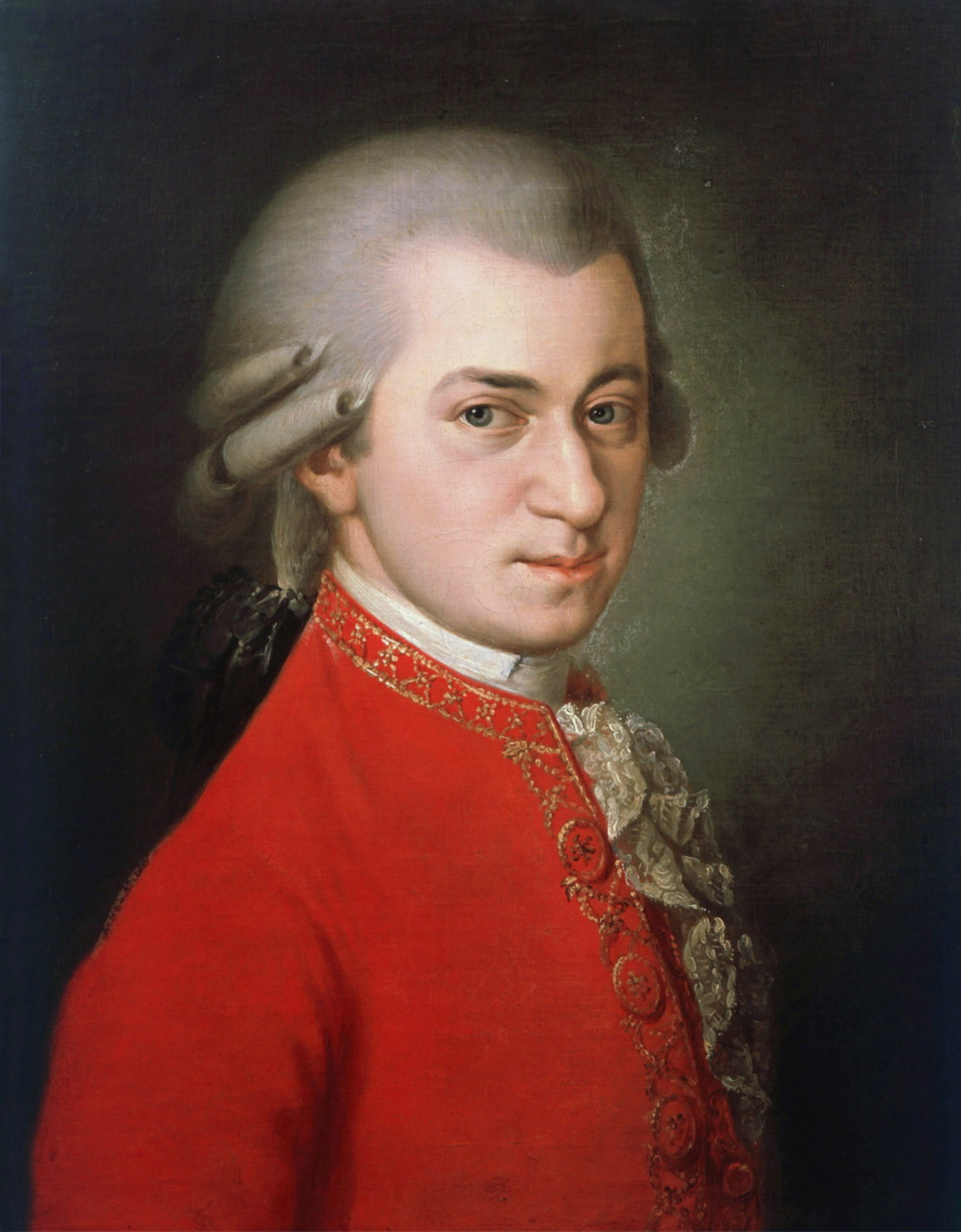
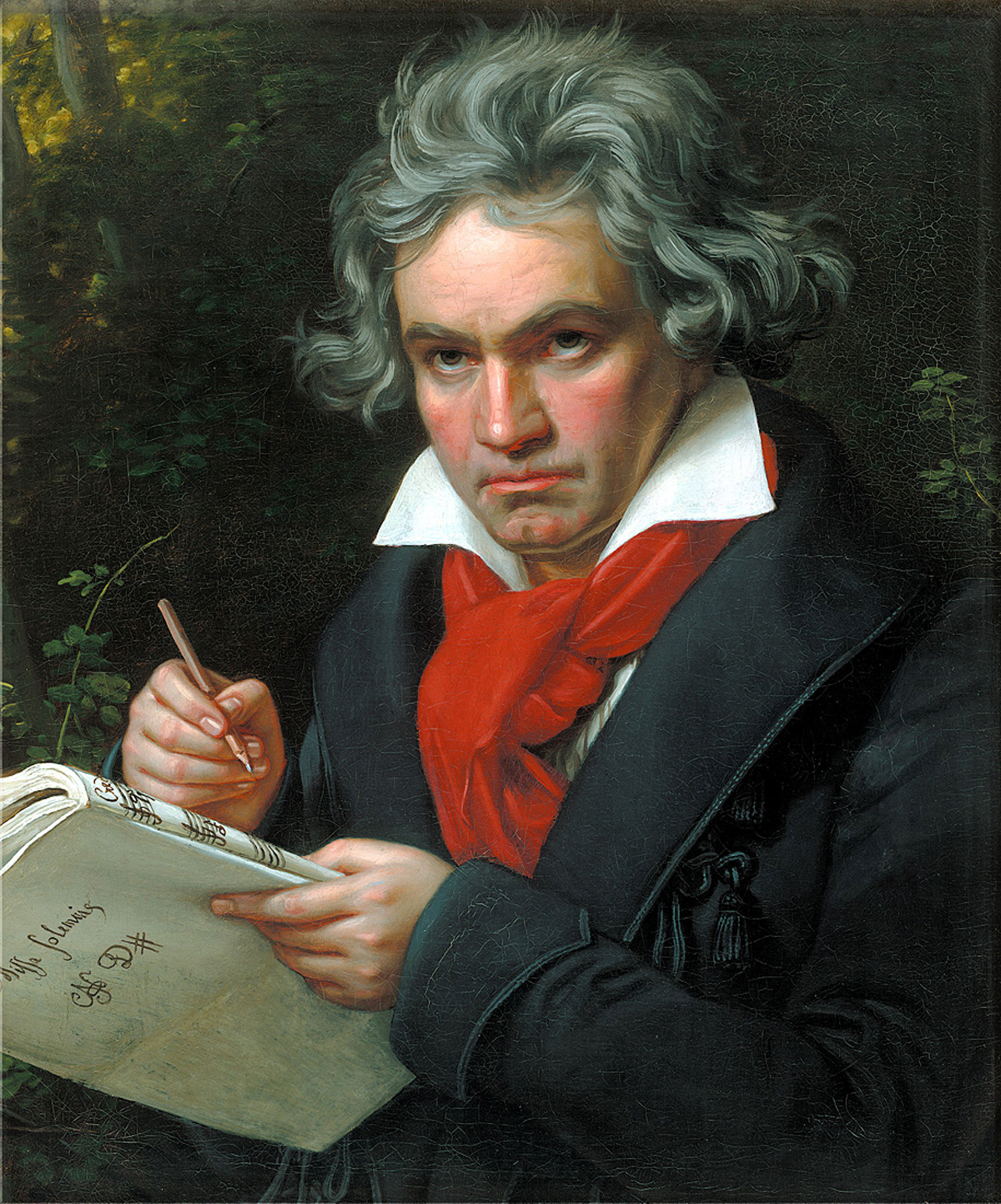
The Detour in Vienna paid homage to two iconic figures of classical music: Wolfgang Amadeus Mozart (left) and Ludwig van Beethoven (right).
- Episode 3: "I Wasn't Even Going to Touch You Until You Slammed My Head Backwards" (June 12, 2003)
- Eliminated: Russell and Cindy

Locations

- Venice (Laguna Veneta – Citta di Padova)
- Venice → Vienna, Austria
- Vienna (Vienna Sewers – Intersection of Friedrichstraße & Operngasse → Heumarkt)
- Vienna (Stadtpark)
- Vienna (Schönbrunn Palace)
- Vienna (Mozart House or Beethoven House)
- Vienna (Donauturm)
- Vienna → Gmunden
- Gmunden (Schloss Ort)

Episode summary

- At the start of this leg, teams were instructed to travel by train to Vienna, Austria. Once there, they had to enter the city's sewers at the intersection of Friedrichstraße and Operngasse and follow a path to the Johann Strauss II monument at the Stadtpark, where they found their next clue. Teams then had to flag down a horse-drawn carriage called a fiacre and grab the ticket hanging on the carriage for one of three departure times. Teams then directed their fiacre to Schönbrunn Palace, where they found their next clue.
- This leg's Fast Forward required one team to enter the ballroom at Schönbrunn Palace, where each team member had to carry a tray full of champagne glasses across the room and through the crowd without spilling any of the drinks. Steve and Josh won the Fast Forward.
- This leg's Detour was a choice between Mozart or Beethoven. In Mozart, teams had to carry a string bass six miles (9.7 km) to the well-known house where Wolfgang Amadeus Mozart wrote The Marriage of Figaro to receive their next clue. In Beethoven, teams had to carry a portfolio of sheet music 11 miles (18 km) to a lesser-known house where Ludwig van Beethoven wrote The Heiligenstadt Testaments to receive their next clue.
- After the Detour, teams had to travel to the Donauturm, where they found their next clue.
- In this leg's Roadblock, one team member had to perform a 460-foot (140 m) bungee jump off the Donauturm to receive their next clue.
- After the Roadblock, teams had to travel by train to Gmunden and then on foot to the Pit Stop: Schloss Ort.

Additional note

- The bungee jump at the Donauturm was later featured as a Switchback and Fast Forward in season 23, but due to high winds, the Fast Forward was unavailable, and no teams chose to wait for weather conditions to improve.

=== Leg 4 (Austria → France) ===
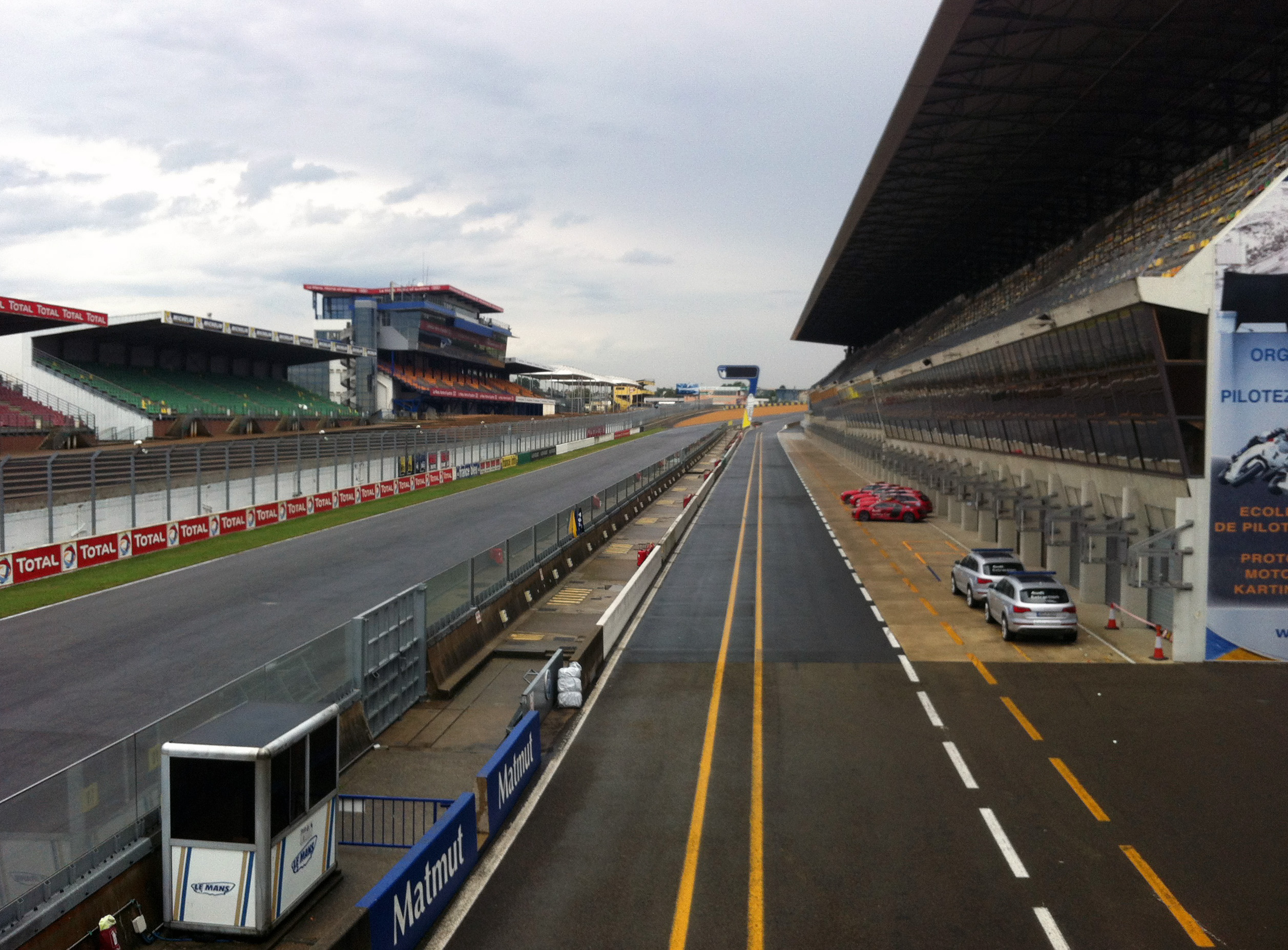
Teams visited the Circuit Bugatti in the French city of Le Mans in the fourth leg.

- Episode 4: "Check Your Tires Because... Oh God, You Never Know What'll Happen!" (June 19, 2003)
- Eliminated: Steve and Josh

Locations

- Gmunden (Schloss Ort)
- Gmunden → Salzburg or Munich, Germany
- Salzburg or Munich → Paris, France
- Paris → Le Mans
- Le Mans (Circuit de la Sarthe – Circuit Bugatti)
- Marseille (Phare de Sainte Marie)
- Aix-en-Provence (Musée de Tapisseries)
- Bagnols-en-Forêt (Gorges du Blavet – Point de Vue du VAR)
- Saint-Rémy-de-Provence (Château des Alpilles)

Episode summary

- At the start of this leg, teams were instructed to fly to Paris, France, and then travel by train to Le Mans. To get to Paris, teams traveled by train to either Salzburg or Munich, Germany, and then flew to Paris. Once there, teams had to travel to the Circuit de la Sarthe and find their next clue.
- In this leg's Roadblock, one team member had to change the tires on a race car and then drive a high-speed lap around the Circuit Bugatti with a professional driver. Once the lap was completed, they received their next clue at the winners' podium.
- After the Roadblock, teams had to drive themselves to the Phare de Sainte Marie lighthouse in Marseille, where they found their next clue.
- This leg's Fast Forward required one team to find the Musée de Tapisseries in Aix-en-Provence and then arrange a 20-piece puzzle to form a picture of the Château des Alpilles. Tian and Jaree won the Fast Forward.
- Teams who did not attempt the Fast Forward had to drive to the Gorges du Blavet and find their next clue.
- This leg's Detour was a choice between Ropes or Slopes. In Ropes, teams had to rappel down a cliff and then hike a short way to the clue. In Slopes, teams would have had to walk down a much longer trail to the same clue. All teams chose Ropes.
- After the Detour, teams had to check in at the Pit Stop: the Château des Alpilles in Saint-Rémy-de-Provence.

=== Leg 5 (France → Netherlands) ===
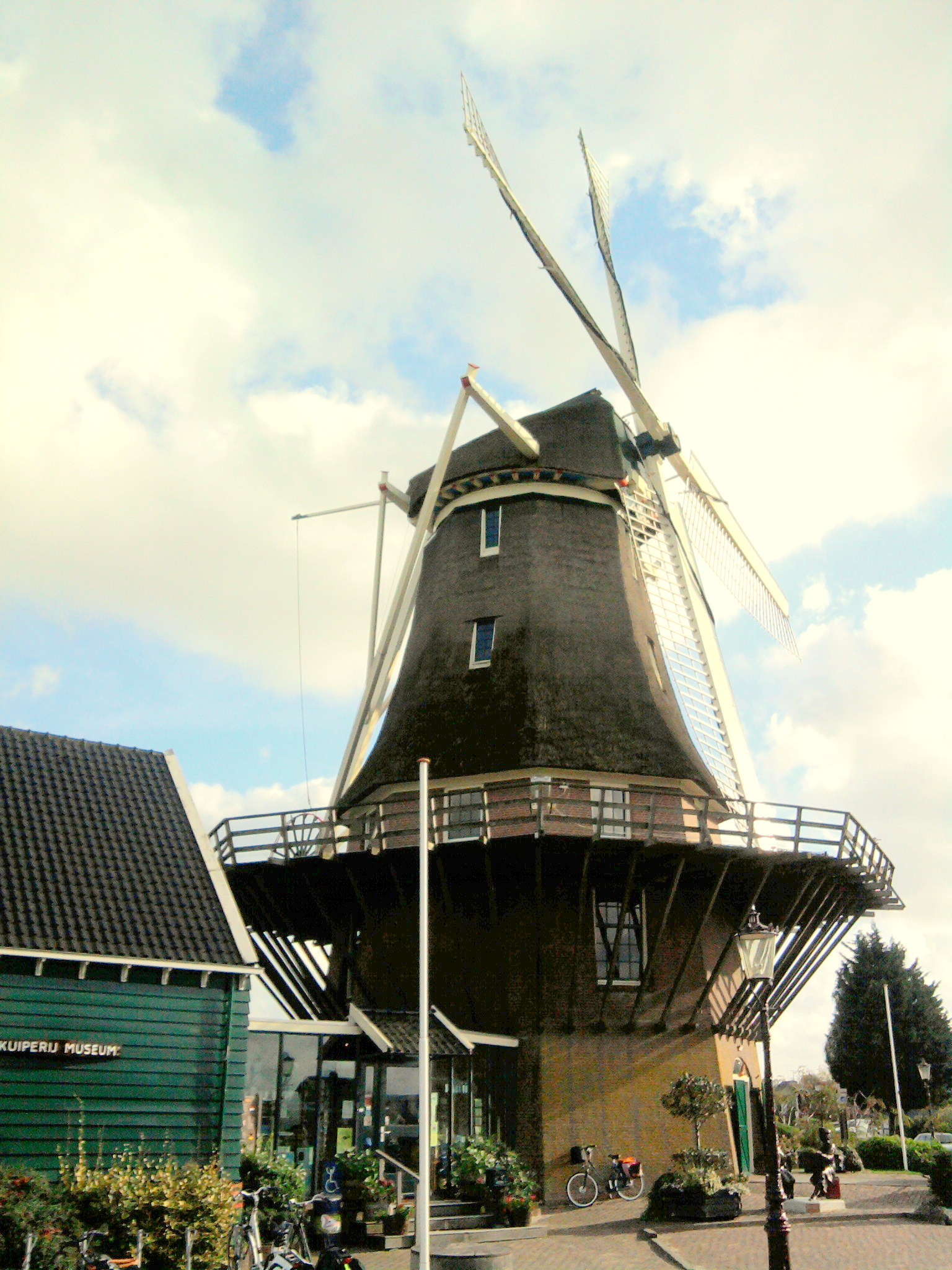
This leg's Fast Forward took place at the Molen van Sloten windmill in Amsterdam.

- Episode: "You Are Just Deliberately Trying to Make Us Lose!" (June 26, 2003)
- Prize: A seven-day Mexican Riviera cruise (awarded to Millie and Chuck)
- Eliminated: Steve and Dave

Locations

- Saint-Rémy-de-Provence (Château des Alpilles)
- Marseille → Amsterdam, Netherlands
- Amsterdam (Magere Brug → Scheepvaart Museum)
- Amsterdam (Molen van Sloten)
- Alkmaar (Alkmaar Cheese Market) or Zuiderwoude (Ranch)
- Monnickendam (Smoker Statue)
- Muiden (Muiden Castle)

Episode summary

- At the start of this leg, teams were instructed to fly to Amsterdam, Netherlands. Once there, teams had to find the "White Skinny Bridge" (the Magere Brug), where they found their next clue. Teams had to take a boat and, using a provided map, navigate through the Amsterdam canals to the Scheepvaart Museum to find their next clue.
- This leg's Fast Forward required one team to travel to the Molen van Sloten. There, each team member was strapped onto the sails of the windmill and had to endure ten rotations once the windmill was set in motion. Millie and Chuck won the Fast Forward.
- This leg's Detour was a choice between 500 Kilograms or 15 Feet. In 500 Kilograms, teams drove to Alkmaar's outdoor market, donned wooden clogs, and used a wooden stretcher to carry cheese from a stockpile to a scale. Once they transported exactly 500 kilograms (1,100 lb) of cheese, teams received their next clue. In 15 Feet, teams drove to a ranch outside Amsterdam that processed cow manure into fertilizer, and had to search through a pile of manure 15 feet (4.6 m) high for their next clue.
- In this leg's Roadblock, one team member had to get on a marked boat, catch 25 eels with their hands, and transfer them to a container to receive their next clue, which directed them to the Pit Stop: the Muiden Castle in Muiden.

=== Leg 6 (Netherlands → India) ===
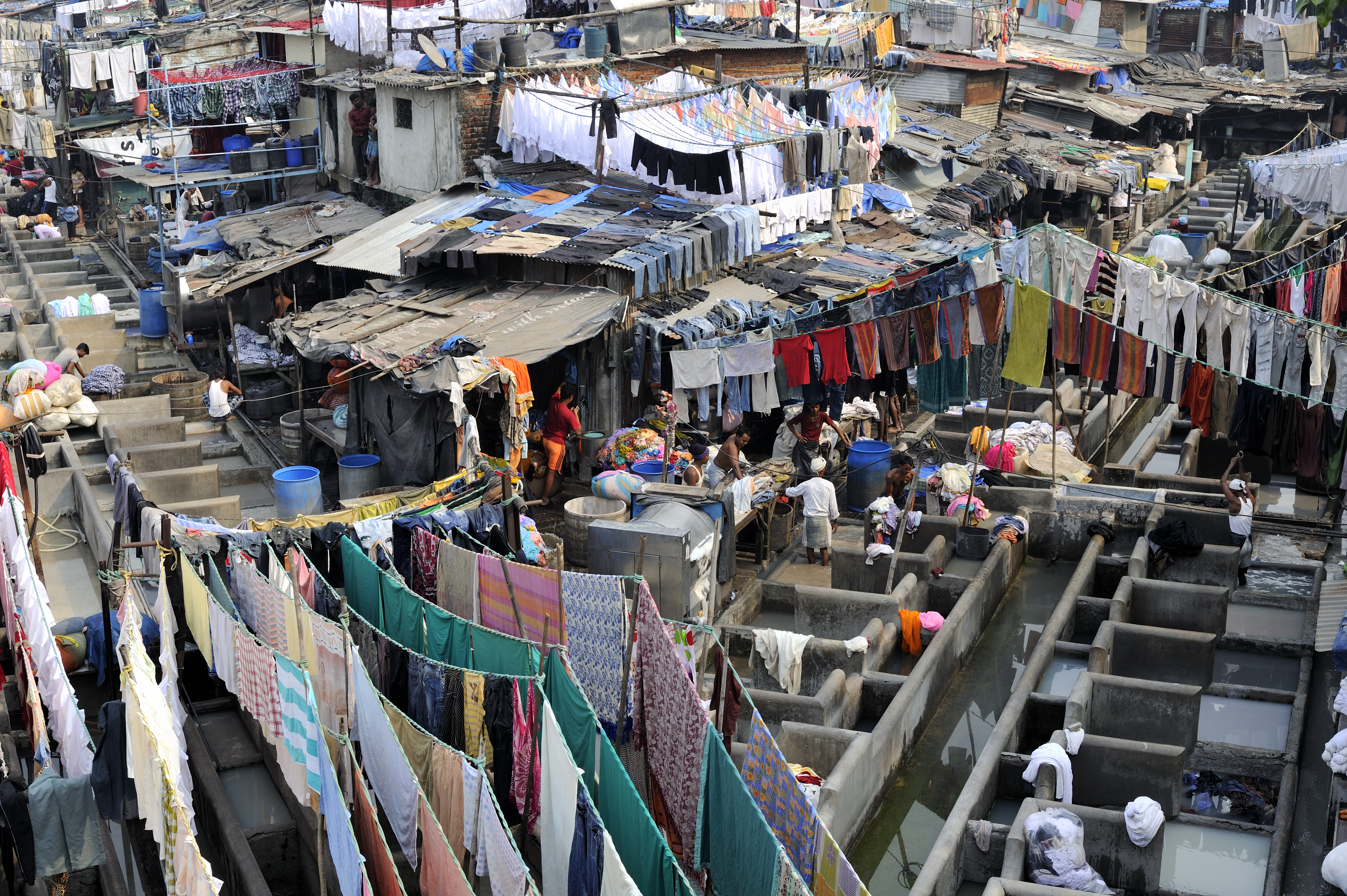
For one half of the Detour in Mumbai, teams had to wash a bundle of clothing in Dhobi Ghat to find a printed clue.

- Episode: "I Could Have Never Been Prepared For What I'm Looking at Right Now" (July 3, 2003)
- Prize: A seven-night cruise to the Hubbard Glacier (awarded to David and Jeff)
- Eliminated: Monica and Sheree

Locations

- Muiden (Kasteel Muiderslot)
- Amsterdam → Mumbai, India
- Mumbai (Film City)
- Mumbai (Dhobi Ghat or P. Amarlel Clothing Shop)
- Mumbai (Sassoon Docks – Indo Universal Engineering)
- Mumbai (Gateway of India)

Episode summary

- At the start of this leg, teams were instructed to fly to Mumbai, India. Once there, teams had to travel to Film City, where they were directed to ride bicycles through the movie backlot to a Bollywood sound stage, where they found their next clue.
- This leg's Detour was a choice between Suds or Duds. In Suds, teams had to find an outdoor laundromat in Dhobi Ghat and hand wash a bundle of clothing to reveal their next clue imprinted on one piece of the clothing. In Duds, teams had to locate a clothing shop, search through hundreds of saris, find one imprinted with their next clue.
- After the Detour, teams had to travel to the Sassoon Docks where they found their next clue.
- In this leg's Roadblock, one team member had to carry twenty fish out of a large catch of mixed fish to the market manager to receive their next clue, which directed them to the Pit Stop: the Gateway of India.

=== Leg 7 (India) ===
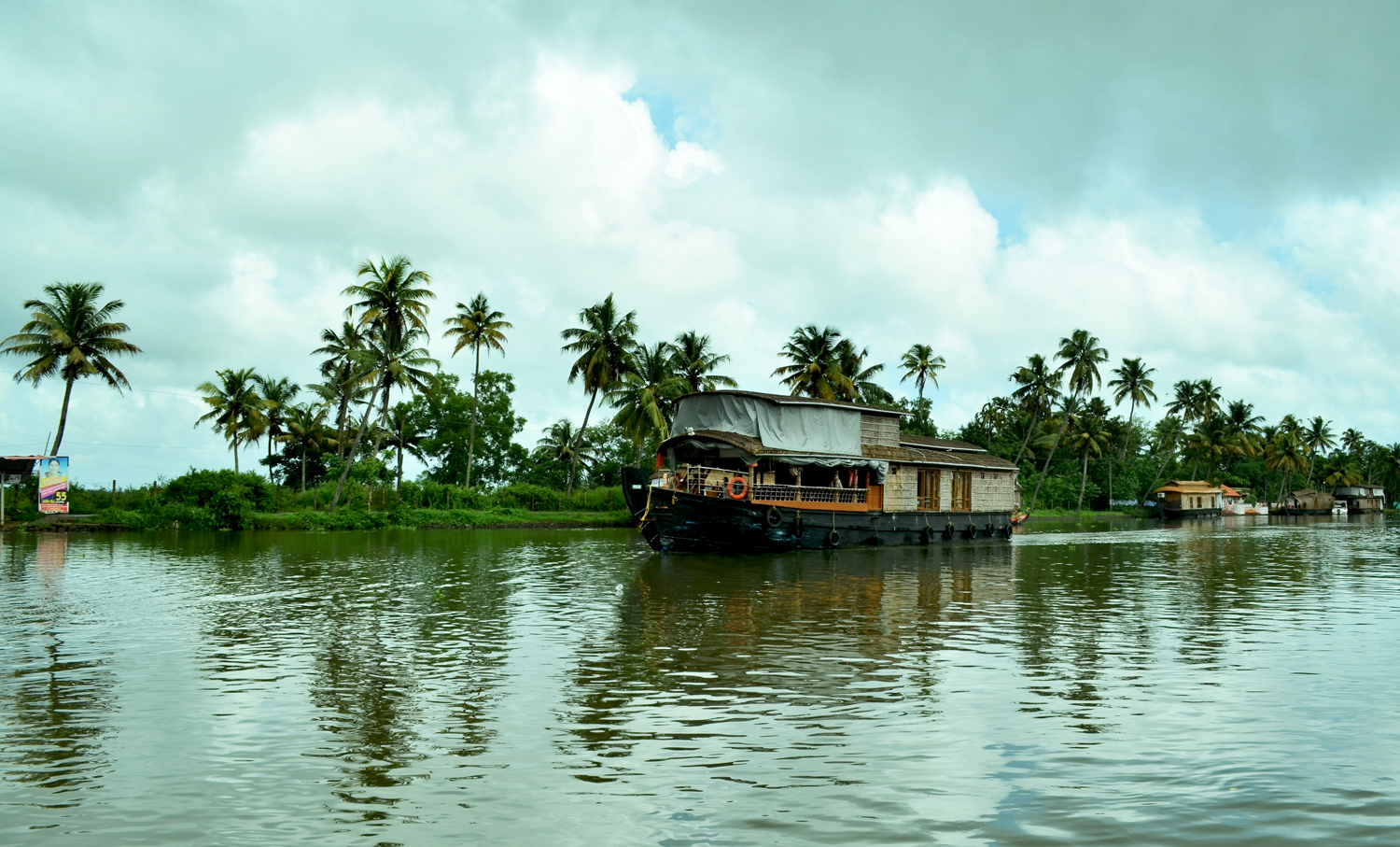
The Finishing Point houseboat at Punnamada Lake in Alleppey served as the Pit Stop for this leg.

- Episode 7: "We're Going Down the Wrong Side of The Freeway... and the Lights Are Off!" (July 10, 2003)
- Prize: A seven-night cruise to the Western Caribbean (awarded to David and Jeff)
- Eliminated: Tian and Jaree

Locations

- Mumbai (Gateway of India)
- Panvel → Kochi (Ernakulam Junction)
- Ernakulam (National Highway 47)
- Alleppey (Sports Field on the Alappuzha–Changanassery Highway)
- Alleppey (Beach Road)
- Alleppey (Punnamada Lake – The Finishing Point)

Episode summary

- At the start of this leg, teams were instructed to travel by overnight train to Ernakulam Junction in the Ernakulam neighborhood of Kochi. Once there, teams had to search along a stretch of highway for a clue hidden amongst thousands of yellow-and-red billboards.
- In this leg's Roadblock, one team member had to take part in bull racing by hanging onto a team of bulls running across a mud course to receive their next clue.
- After the Roadblock, teams had to travel to Beach Road to find their next clue.
- This leg's Detour was a choice between Baskets or Trunks. In Baskets, teams had to load ten live chickens into baskets on a bicycle-powered wagon and then pedal to a farm, where they could exchange the chickens for their next clue. In Trunks, teams had to load two bales of coir onto an elephant and then ride the elephant to a coir shop, trading their cargo for their next clue.
- After the Detour, teams had to check in at the Pit Stop: Punnamada Lake in Alleppey.

=== Leg 8 (India → Malaysia) ===
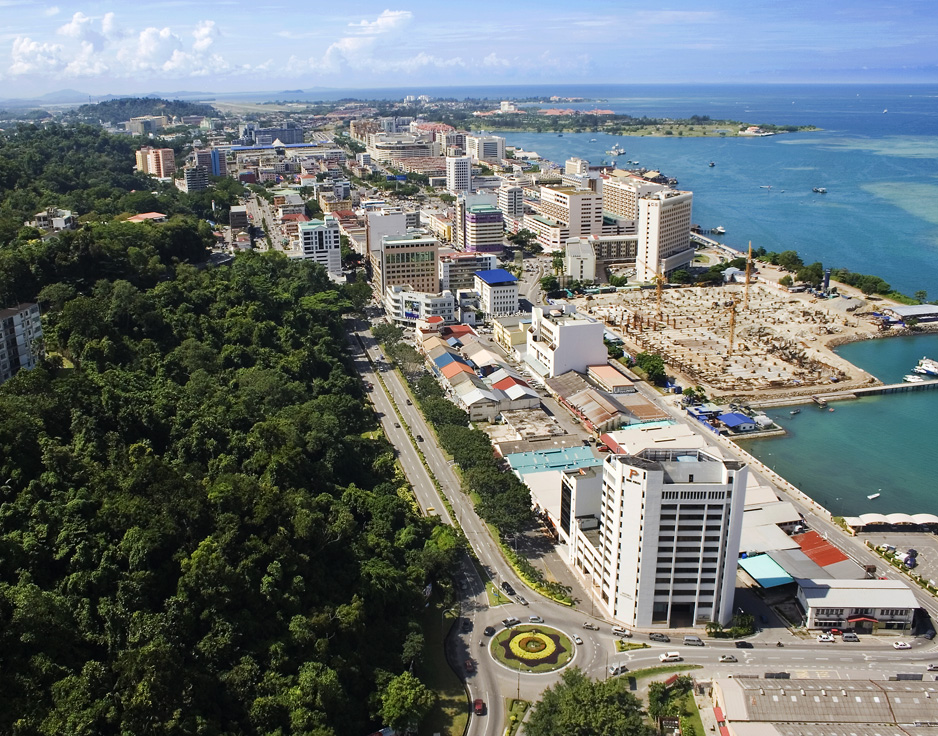
Teams traveled to Kota Kinabalu in Malaysian Borneo during this leg.

- Episode 8: "The Priestess Reminded Me of My Grandmother. She Was Very Old But Still Very, Very With It" (July 17, 2003)
- Prize: A trip to Mexico (awarded to Jon and Al)

Locations

- Alleppey (Punnamada Lake – The Finishing Point)
- Kochi → Kota Kinabalu, Malaysia
- Penampang (Monsopiad Cultural Village)
- Kota Kinabalu (Kota Kinabalu Boat Jetty)
- Tunku Abdul Rahman National Park (Manukan Island)

Episode summary

- At the start of this leg, teams were instructed to fly to Kota Kinabalu, Malaysia, on the island of Borneo. Once there, teams went to the Monsopiad Cultural Village, where they received a traditional Malaysian blessing and their next clue. They were directed to travel to Jesselton Point, which was referred to as the "Kota Kinabalu Boat Jetty", and had to choose a boat to take them to a fishing trawler, where they found their next clue.
- This leg's Detour was a choice between Net or Trap. In Net, teams had to take their boat to a fishing platform and use a net to catch fifteen fish out of a pen to receive their next clue. In Trap, teams had to take their boat to a group of lobster boats and pull up one weighted lobster trap to retrieve the clue from inside.
- After the Detour, teams had to travel by boat to Manukan Island to find their next clue.
- In this leg's Roadblock, one team member had to hit three targets using three different Malaysian weapons: a bow and arrow, a blowpipe, and a spear. After successfully hitting all three targets, teams could run to the nearby Pit Stop.

Additional note

- This was a non-elimination leg.

=== Leg 9 (Malaysia) ===
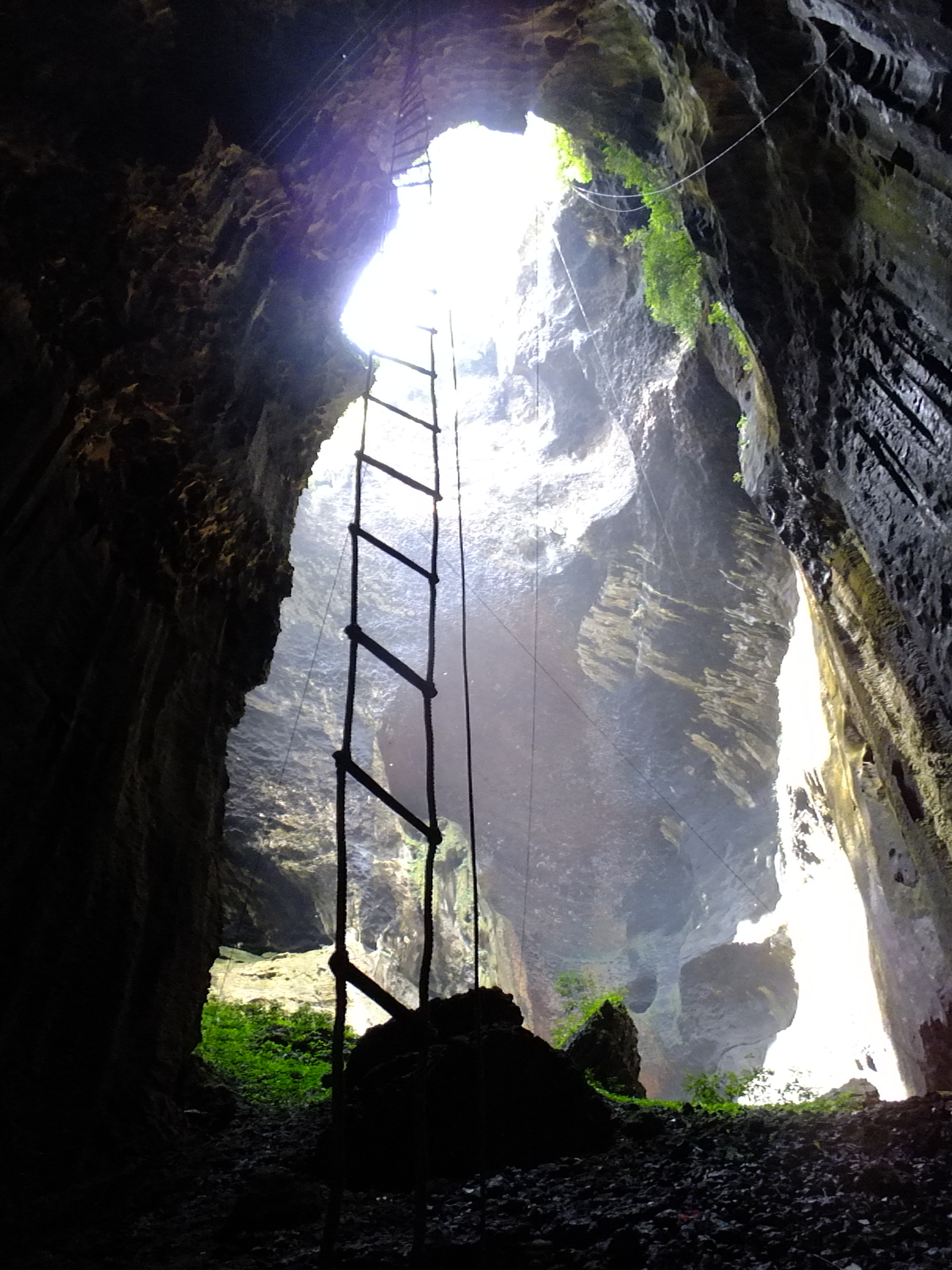
For the Roadblock, team members climbed Gomantong Caves, known for their intricate limestone formations.

- Episode 9: "We're Not at Charm School Learning How to Be a Gentleman, We're Racing" (July 24, 2003)
- Prize: A Latin American vacation (awarded to Reichen and Chip)
- Eliminated: Millie and Chuck

Locations

- Tunku Abdul Rahman National Park (Manukan Island)
- Ranau (Poring Hot Springs)
- Sepilok (Sepilok Orangutan Sanctuary)
- Sandakan (Trushidup Palm Oil Plantation)
- Kinabatangan (Gomantong Caves)
- Sepilok (Sepilok Nature Resort)

Episode summary

- At the start of this leg, teams were instructed to travel by boat back to the mainland and then drive to the Poring Hot Springs in Ranau. There, teams had to cross a series of tree bridges to reach their next clue, which directed them to the Trushidup palm oil plantation in Sandakan.
- This leg's Fast Forward required one team to drive to the Sepilok Orangutan Sanctuary. There, the team had to hike to a feeding station in the jungle and feed two pieces of fruit to an orangutan. Reichen and Chip won the Fast Forward.
- This leg's Detour was a choice between Chop or Haul. In Chop, teams had to chop down palm nut bunches with a clue attached. However, only one out of every four envelopes contained a clue. In Haul, teams used a wheelbarrow to carry 25 palm nut bunches to a truck. When the truck was fully loaded, it was driven forward and revealed the teams' next clue underneath.
- After the Detour, teams had to drive to Gomantong Caves to find their next clue.
- In this leg's Roadblock, one team member had to climb a rattan ladder to a point 50 feet (15 m) above the Gomantong Caves floor, grab a basket, and retrieve their next clue from inside.
- After the Roadblock, teams had to check in at the Pit Stop: the Sepilok Nature Resort.

=== Leg 10 (Malaysia → South Korea) ===
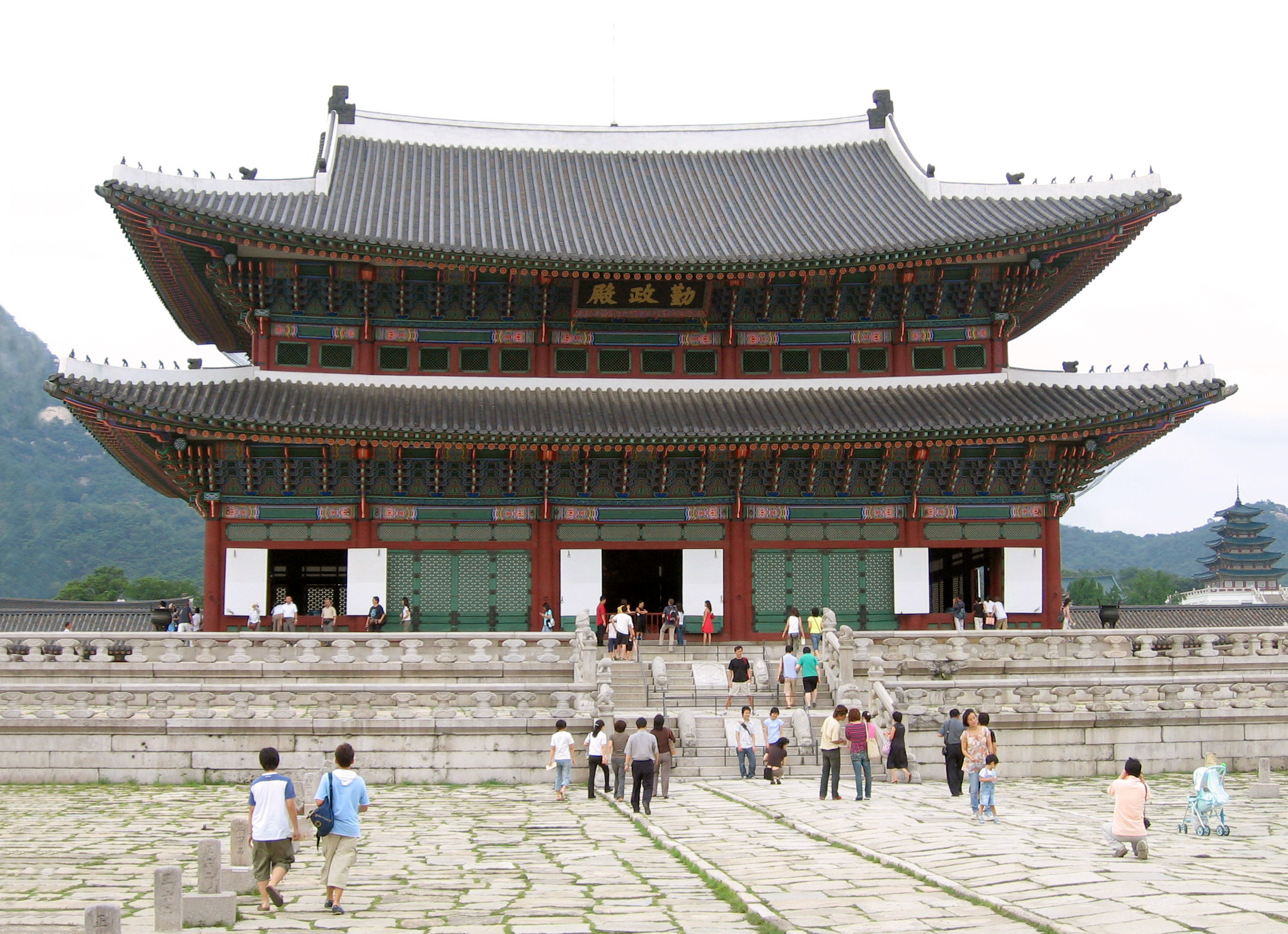
Gyeongbokgung Palace in Seoul was the Pit Stop for this leg.

- Episode 10: "That's Me. That's My Face. Just Hit My Face. Hit My Face!" (July 31, 2003)
- Prize: A Caribbean vacation (awarded to Kelly and Jon)

Locations

- Sepilok (Sepilok Nature Resort)
- Sandakan (Puu Jih Shih Temple)
- Kota Kinabalu → Seoul, South Korea
- Seoul (Namsan Park – Seoul Tower)
- Cheorwon (Hantan River – Rafting Korea)
- Seoul (Subway Station 228)
- Seoul (Taekwondo Dojang or Haetae Restaurant)
- Seoul (Gyeongbokgung Palace – Geunjeongjeon Hall)

Episode summary

- At the start of this leg, teams were instructed to travel to the Puu Jih Shih Temple and search through thousands of tiny Buddha figurines for one with their names on it. Behind the figurine was a key to a rattan bag holding their next clue, which instructed them to return to Kota Kinabalu and then fly to Seoul, South Korea. Once there, teams had to travel to Namsan Park and find their next clue at the base of the Seoul Tower. Team then had to travel to Rafting Korea in the Sundam Valley to find their next clue.
- In this leg's Roadblock, one team member had to plunge into the icy Hantan River and swim under the ice to an exit hole. Once their body temperature had returned to a safe level, a doctor cleared them to leave and gave them their next clue.
- After the Roadblock, teams were instructed to travel back to Seoul and search Station 228 of the Seoul Metropolitan Subway for their next clue.
- This leg's Detour was a choice between Strong Hands or Strong Stomach. In Strong Hands, teams used a map to find a Taekwondo dojang, where both team members had to break three sets of wooden boards to receive their next clue. In Strong Stomach, teams used a map to find the Haetae Restaurant, where both team members had to eat san-nakji – raw octopus – to receive their next clue.
- After the Detour, teams had to check in at the Pit Stop: Gyeongbokgung Palace.

Additional note

- This was a non-elimination leg.

=== Leg 11 (South Korea → Australia) ===
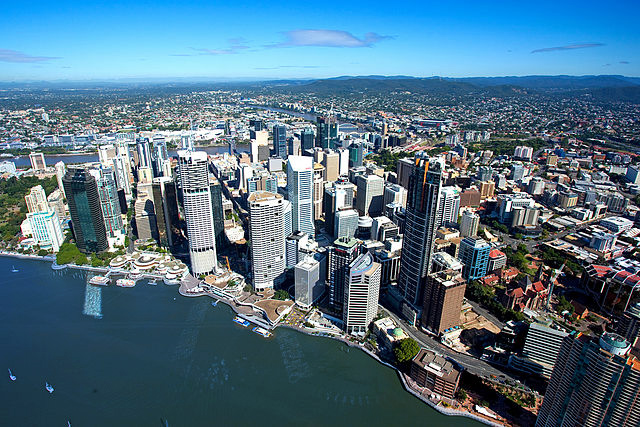
Teams traveled to Brisbane, Australia, in this leg.

- Episode 11: "Such a Nice Pheromone Smell to You; Just Makes Me Want to Stay Close to You" (August 7, 2003)
- Prize: A trip to Mexico (awarded to David and Jeff)
- Eliminated: Jon and Al

Locations

- Seoul (Gyeongbokgung Palace – Geunjeongjeon Hall)
- Seoul (Yeouido Island – Hangang Park)
- Seoul → Brisbane, Australia
- Sunshine Coast (Beach)
- Brisbane (City Centre – Holiday Inn)
- Mooloolaba (UnderWater World)
- Mooloolaba (Mooloolaba Yacht Club)

Episode summary

- At the start of this leg, teams were instructed to go to Hangang Park, where they had to pull on a string to release their next clue dangling from a kite. This clue instructed teams to fly to Brisbane, Australia.
- This season's final Fast Forward required one team to drive to a beach on the Sunshine Coast and pass a lifeguard test by paddling surfboards into a heavy surf, pulling a swimmer out of the water, and returning her safely to the beach. David and Jeff won the Fast Forward.
- Teams who did not attempt the Fast Forward had to travel to the Holiday Inn hotel and find the concierge, who led them to the penthouse, where they found their next clue.
- This leg's Detour was a choice between Face First or Foot First. In Face First, teams had to complete a face-first rappel from the penthouse to the ground to receive their next clue. In Foot First, teams would have had to locate a nearby Sheraton hotel, race downstairs from the penthouse, across the street, and then up thirty stories to the roof where they would have received their next clue. All teams chose Face First.
- After the Detour, teams drove to UnderWater World in Mooloolaba, where they found their next clue.
- In this leg's Roadblock, one team member had to don scuba gear, walk through an aquarium filled with sharks and rays, and then retrieve their clue from a treasure chest on the aquarium floor.
- After the Roadblock, teams had to travel on foot to the Pit Stop: the Mooloolaba Yacht Club.

=== Leg 12 (Australia) ===
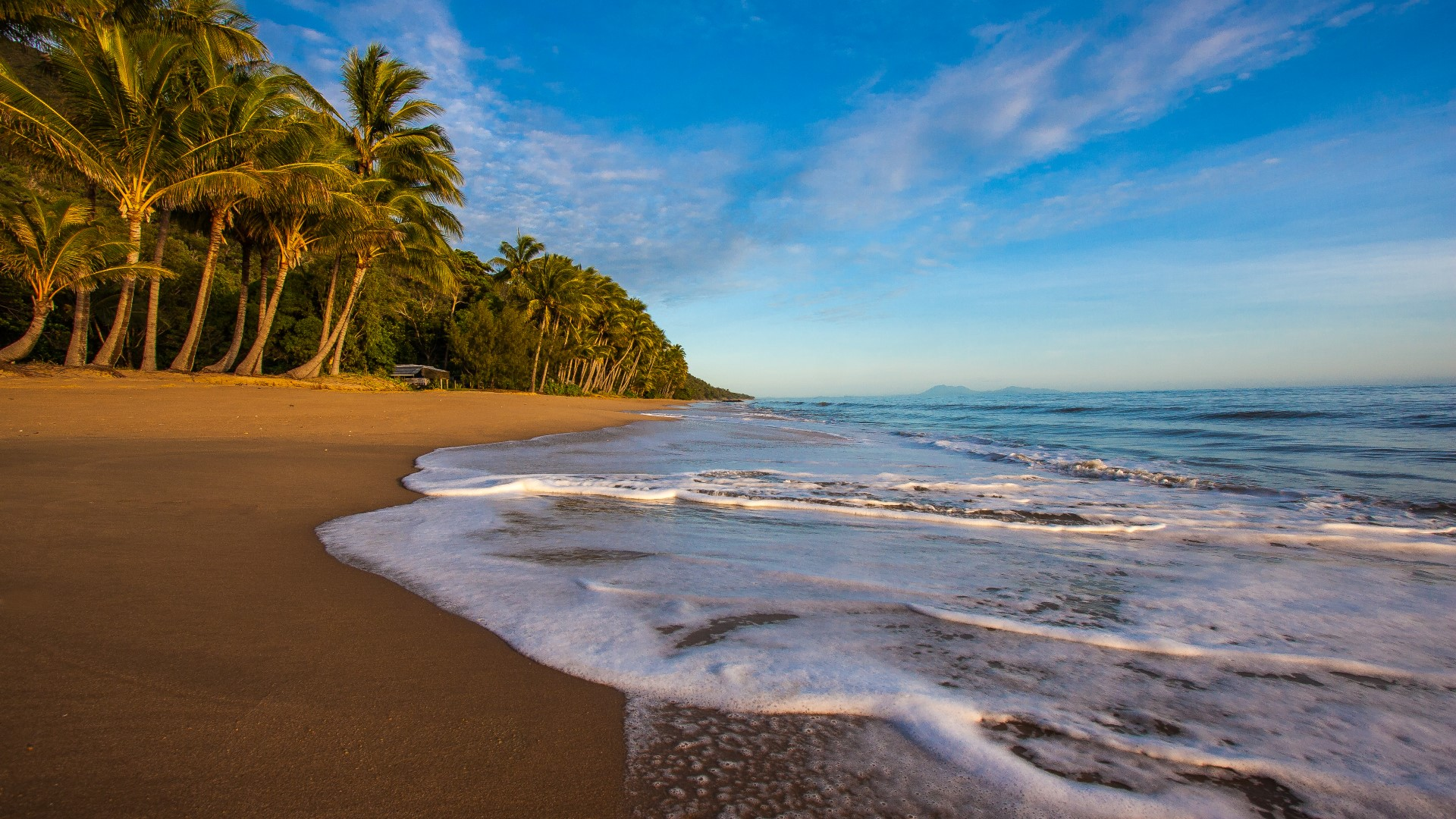
Ellis Beach near Cairns was the Pit Stop for this leg.

- Episode 12: "He's A Couple of Ticks Away From Having a Heart Attack" (August 14, 2003)
- Prize: A trip to Europe (awarded to David and Jeff)

Locations

- Mooloolaba (Mooloolaba Yacht Club)
- Ferny Hills (Australian Woolshed)
- Brisbane → Cairns
- Cairns (Wild World)
- Wangetti (Wangetti Beach)
- Julatten (Off Road Rush)
- Ellis Beach (Ellis Beach)

Episode summary

- At the start of this leg, teams had to search through one of three piles of wool in Ferny Hills for their next clue, which instructed them to fly to Cairns. Once there, teams had to drive to Wild World, where they had to follow a path to the crocodile pen. One team member had to use a feeding stick to feed a crocodile while their teammate took a picture with a digital camera. They then had to find the souvenir shop and develop their picture, where they found their next clue printed on the back.
- This leg's Detour was a choice between Saddle or Paddle. In Saddle, teams had to search a stretch of beach on horseback to find one of four route markers, and then search a 25-yard (23 m) radius for a cluster of clue envelopes. However, only one cluster contained the correct clue, while the other three instructed them to try again. In Paddle, teams would have had to inflate a kayak using a hand pump, push the kayak into the ocean, and paddle to an orange buoy to retrieve their next clue. All teams chose Saddle.
- After the Detour, teams had to drive to Off Road Rush to find their next clue.
- In this leg's Roadblock, one team member had to drive a race buggy at high speeds through a seven-mile (11 km) course to receive their next clue, which directed them to the Pit Stop: Ellis Beach.

Additional note

- This was a non-elimination leg.

=== Leg 13 (Australia → United States) ===
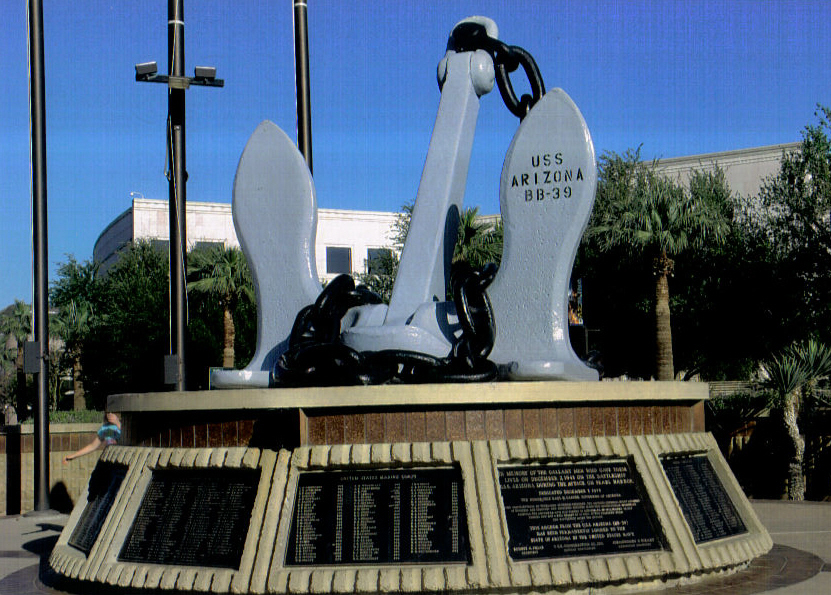
The season's final leg required teams to visit the USS Arizona Memorial in Phoenix, Arizona.

- Episode 13: "It's Like Adam Building His First House!" (August 21, 2003)
- Prize: US$1,000,000
- Winners: Reichen and Chip
- Second Place: Kelly and Jon
- Third Place: David and Jeff

Locations

- Ellis Beach (Ellis Beach)
- Smithfield (Tjapukai Aboriginal Cultural Park)
- Cairns (Cairns Airport – General Aviation Terminal)
- Cairns → Kona, Hawaii
- Hawaiʻi (Kaulana Bay)
- Hawaiʻi (Hawaii Volcanoes National Park)
- Hilo or Kona → Phoenix, Arizona
- Phoenix (USS Arizona Memorial)
- Tempe (Sun Devil Stadium)
- Phoenix (Papago Park)

Episode summary

- At the start of this leg, teams traveled to the Tjapukai Aboriginal Cultural Park, where they observed a traditional Aboriginal ceremony. After the ceremony, teams were presented with their next clue, which directed them to the General Aviation Terminal at Cairns Airport.
- This season's final Detour was a choice between Wing It or Wander It. In Wing It, teams had to skydive in tandem with an instructor to retrieve their next clue at the landing zone. In Wander It, teams would have driven to a mangrove forest, found a boat, and then navigated out of the forest to the skydive landing zone to retrieve their next clue. All teams chose Wing It.
- Teams were then instructed to fly to the Big Island of Hawaii. Once there, teams had to drive to the southernmost point of the United States – Kaulana Bay – to find their next clue.
- In this season's final Roadblock, one team member had to swim out to a floating tiki head and then dive down to retrieve a large stone from the ocean floor. They then had to carry it back to the beach and smash it open using an assortment of tools to find the clue inside.
- After the Roadblock, teams had to travel to Hawaii Volcanoes National Park, where they followed a path over a bed of volcanic rock to their next clue, which instructed them to fly to Phoenix, Arizona. Once there, teams had to find their next clue at the anchor of the USS Arizona at the Arizona Memorial. Teams were then instructed to travel to Sun Devil Stadium, where they had to solve a riddle to locate a specific seat where they found their final clue, which directed them to the finish line at Papago Park.

Additional note

- David and Jeff, thinking they could get a faster flight to Hawaii through Sydney, were stranded in the Sydney Airport for so long that by the time they finally arrived in Hawaii, they received notification that the other teams had already crossed the finish line in Phoenix.

== Reception ==
Compared to the first three seasons, which were positively received, The Amazing Race 4 received more mixed reviews. Linda Holmes of Television Without Pity wrote, "I loved a lot of things about the season, but that ending blew." Heather Havrilesky of Salon wrote that "'The Amazing Race' has always been an imaginative and well-produced show, but this year's lineup of couples has offered more hilarious calamities and personality clashes than usual." Kareem Gantt of Screen Rant wrote that "season four may not have had a cast that was particularly likable, but it did visit some cool locations". In 2016, this season was ranked 22nd out of the first 27 seasons by the Rob Has a Podcast Amazing Race correspondents. In 2024, Rhenn Taguiam of Game Rant placed this season within the bottom 13 out of 36.

In 2004, this season of The Amazing Race won the series its second consecutive Primetime Emmy Award for Outstanding Reality Competition Program.

== Ratings ==
No. overall	No. in season	Title	Original release date	U.S. viewers (millions)	Rating/share (18–49)
36	1	"Cheaters Never Win... and They Cheated!"	May 29, 2003	9.94	3.7/12
37	2	"It Doesn't Say Anything About First Come First Served... and We're Bigger"	June 5, 2003	8.27	3.2/11
38	3	"I Wasn't Even Going to Touch You Until You Slammed My Head Backwards"	June 12, 2003	8.13	3.1/10
39	4	"Check Your Tires Because... Oh God, You Never Know What'll Happen!"	June 19, 2003	7.59	2.8/10
40	5	"You Are Just Deliberately Trying to Make Us Lose!"	June 26, 2003	7.86	2.9/10
41	6	"I Could Have Never Been Prepared for What I'm Looking at Right Now"	July 3, 2003	6.93	2.4/10
42	7	"We're Going Down the Wrong Side of The Freeway... and the Lights Are Off!"	July 10, 2003	8.05	3.0/11
43	8	"The Priestess Reminded Me of My Grandmother. She Was Very Old but Still Very, Very With It"	July 17, 2003	7.78	2.9/10
44	9	"We're Not at Charm School Learning How to Be a Gentleman, We're Racing"	July 24, 2003	8.60	3.3/12
45	10	"That's Me. That's My Face. Just Hit My Face. Hit My Face!"	July 31, 2003	8.13	2.9/10
46	11	"Such a Nice Pheromone Smell to You; Just Makes Me Want to Stay Close to You"	August 7, 2003	8.35	3.1/11
47	12	"He's a Couple of Ticks Away from Having a Heart Attack"	August 14, 2003	8.70	2.9/10
48	13	"It's Like Adam Building His First House"	August 21, 2003	9.88	3.7/12

== Works cited ==
- Castro, Adam-Troy (2006). My Ox Is Broken!. BenBella Books. ISBN 978-1-932100-91-4.
