= Chip Arndt =

American gay activist (born 1966)

- Born: Willis Chapman Arndt Jr. October 2, 1966 (age 59); West Hartford, Connecticut, U.S.
- Education: Yale University (BA); Harvard University (MBA)
- Occupations: Business consultant, LGBT rights activist
- Years active: 1990–present
- Television: The Amazing Race 4
- Partner: Reichen Lehmkuhl (1999–2003)

Willis Chapman "Chip" Arndt Jr. (born October 2, 1966) is an American gay activist, best known as a winner of The Amazing Race 4 in 2003 with former partner Reichen Lehmkuhl. Arndt attended Hotchkiss School, Yale University, and Harvard University, where he was the president of the Harvard Business School Gay and Lesbian Student Association. Prior to The Amazing Race, he worked as an investment banker.

== Early life and education ==
The youngest and only boy of four children, Arndt attended Hotchkiss School, a private school in his native Connecticut, and won a fellowship to a 13th year at Harrow College in Northwest London. He earned his undergraduate degree in history, with honors, at Yale University in 1990, where he was captain of the golf team. He worked for five years as an investment banker for Morgan Stanley as well as in the entertainment industry in Los Angeles. He then entered Harvard University for an MBA in 1996. He was president of the Harvard Graduate School Leadership and Ethics Forum, chairman and founder of the Annual Harvard Business, Law, and Harvard Kennedy School Debate, and president of the Harvard Business School Gay and Lesbian Student Association.

== The Amazing Race ==
Arndt and former partner Reichen Lehmkuhl competed against eleven other teams the fourth season, taped in January and February 2003, and premiering in May. The couple, who had met in 1999 while Reichen was still in the United States Air Force, had a commitment ceremony on February 2, 2002. While not legally married, they had asked that CBS identify them as a married couple. The identification of a gay couple as married drew criticism from anti-gay groups. By the final episode, Reichen and Chip had an 83% popularity rating on the show's official website. Arndt performed seven of eleven roadblocks (tasks only one team member can perform). In total, they placed second on five legs of the race, with their win on the final leg being their second first place, eight minutes ahead of runners up Kelly and Jon. The finale was broadcast on August 21, 2003, with CBS winning both its time slot and the night. Season 4 would later win an Emmy award for Outstanding Reality-Competition Program.

=== The Amazing Race 4 finishes ===
- A green ƒ indicates that Reichen and Chip won the Fast Forward.

Roadblocks performed by Arndt are bolded

Episode	Leg	Destination(s)	Detour choice (underlined)	Roadblock performance	Placement	Notes
1	1	United States → Italy	Search/Rescue	No Roadblock	9th of 12	
2	2	Italy	Waterway/Pathway	**Chip**	2nd of 11	
3	3	Italy → Austria	Mozart/Beethoven	Reichen	3rd of 10	
4	4	Austria → France	Ropes/Slopes	**Chip**	5th of 9	
5	5	France → Netherlands	500 kilograms/15 feet	Reichen	4th of 8	
6	6	Netherlands → India	Suds/Duds	**Chip**	2nd of 7	
7	7	India	Baskets/Trunks	Reichen	5th of 6	
8	8	India → Malaysia	Net/Trap	**Chip**	2nd of 5	
9	9	Malaysia	Used fast forward		1st of 5ƒ	
10	10	Malaysia → South Korea	Strong hands/Strong stomach	**Chip**	2nd of 4	
11	11	South Korea → Australia	Face first/Feet first	Reichen	3rd of 4	(Note: Reichen & Chip initially arrived 2nd, but they drove to the Pit Stop instead of traveling on foot and were issued a 35-minute penalty. During this time, Kelly & Jon checked in, dropping Reichen & Chip to 3rd.)
12	12	Australia	Saddle/Paddle	**Chip**	2nd of 3	
13	13	Australia → United States	Wing it/Wander it	**Chip**	1st of 3	

== Post-Amazing Race ==
Arndt has been active in the LGBT community following the win, and has appeared on the cover of The Advocate. Later that month, Arndt addressed a group of gay-straight alliance leaders. Express Gay News named him "Best Local Male Hero" for using "his fame and good fortune to help others." He is a spokesperson for the annual five-state Braking the Cycle AIDS ride benefiting New York's GLBT Community Center, and Miami's SMART AIDS rides, and has helped raise money for other groups including the Point Foundation, the Human Rights Campaign, and the Matthew Shepard Foundation for which he is a Strategic Advisor. He is a co-director of The Gay American Heroes Foundation, (founded by Scott Hall) and the website CoupleForEquality.com. Arndt was also one of the commentators on the official CBS Website for The Amazing Race 10, where he answered questions from fans of the show about his experiences and behind-the-scenes knowledge about the series, and revealed that he accidentally ran into the returning teams secretly chosen for the program's 11th season, the anticipated "All Stars" version, at an airport.

Each year, Arndt conducts a golf clinic at the Advocate Golf Classic benefiting the National Gay & Lesbian Task Force (NGLTF). As the former Public Relations and Marketing Manager for Care Resource, South Florida's oldest and largest HIV/AIDS services organization, he produced the 2005 AIDS Walk Miami, and spearheaded the 21st annual White Party Miami, its week-long fund-raiser, which, at his initiative, emphasized a zero tolerance drugs policy for the first time. Other charity initiative includes a US$100,000 challenge benefiting nine HIV/AIDS service organizations through his participation in two AIDS ride and two AIDS walks in 2007, and solicited donations via a special MySpace page.

Currently, he is Executive Vice President and Director of Business Development at Merchant Advantage, a Miami-based e-commerce software company he helped found.

Arndt was elected a PLEO (Party Leader and Elected Official) Obama delegate to the 2008 Democratic National Convention and was named one of Florida's 27 electors representing the state in the Electoral College. He cast his vote in the state capital of Tallahassee, Florida for President-elect Obama and Vice President-elect Biden. Arndt was the first openly gay man to have cast an electoral vote in the state of Florida.
