= Infant (disambiguation) =

An infant is a human at the youngest stage of life.

Infant or Infants may also refer to:

- Cleveland Infants, a one-year baseball team in the Players' League
- Zanesville Infants, a short-lived baseball franchise affiliated with the Central League
- Infante, also anglicised as Infant, a title and rank in the Iberian kingdoms of Spain and Portugal
- a legal term referring to any child under the age of legal adulthood
- The Infant (Fonvizin play), 1872
- Infant school, a school for children up to age 7 in England and Wales
- Infant simulator, a lifelike electronic doll

== See also ==
- Infant moth (disambiguation), several species of moth
- Infanta (disambiguation)
- Infante (disambiguation)
- Babyhood (disambiguation)
- Baby (disambiguation)
- Child (disambiguation)
