= Big Brother (Australian TV series) season 8 =

Big Brother
- Season 8
- Presented by: Kyle Sandilands; Jackie O
- No. of days: 85
- No. of housemates: 20
- Winner: Terri Munro
- Runners-up: Rory Ammon; Ben McCallum
- Companion shows: Big Brother's Big Mouth; Friday Night Live
- No. of episodes: 112

Release
- Original network: Network Ten
- Original release: 28 April – 21 July 2008

Season chronology
- ← Previous; Season 7 Next → Season 9

The eighth season of the Australian reality television series, Big Brother, also known as Big Brother 2008, began on 28 April 2008 and was the final season to air on Network Ten during its original run on the network. A total 20 housemates competed in the show. Halfway through the show, the prize money was revealed to be $250,000, the amount originally given in the earlier season of the show.

This season introduced Kyle Sandilands and Jackie O as the new hosts, replacing Gretel Killeen, who had previously hosted the show since its launch. It also featured the return of an adult-themed weekly installment titled Big Mouth. The season featured a new voice for Big Brother, provided by Leon Murray. Compared to Nick Colquhoun's stricter and more authoritarian tone in the 2005–2007 seasons, Murray adopted a more lenient and approachable style. Murray later returned to provide the voice of Big Brother when the series moved to the Nine Network for the 2012–2014 seasons, maintaining a similarly more relaxed and less punitive approach.

== Production ==
=== Auditions ===
Auditions opened in late 2007. People wishing to audition were required to post a video audition of themselves on the official Big Brother website. Voting closed on 7 January 2008. The three people with the highest number of votes would be guaranteed a place in the House with the top 50 others to go through a second selection process.

This season featured a new audition process similar to the format used in the earlier seasons, where people wishing to audition sent in a tape rather than attending cattle call audition sessions. For the first time in Big Brother Australia history, the public could vote which housemates they wanted to see in the House before the start of the show.

=== Promotions ===
Promotional advertisements for the new season premiered on 6 April 2008 featuring a short video of former Australian Prime Minister John Howard criticising the show in 2006, stating that Channel Ten should "get this stupid show off the air", followed by the tagline "I Don't Think So" from the eponymous Kelis track.

=== The show ===
This season began Monday 28 April 2008 at 7:00 pm. The opening episode had the lowest-ever ratings of any launch of Big Brother Australia. The episode mostly outrated its competitors in most timeslots—except its second half-hour when it lost out to Border Security. The audience for the launch peaked at 1.91 million.

This season lasted a total of 84 days. The 2008 finale aired on Monday 21 July 2008 at 7:00 pm on Network Ten. It was the first Big Brother Australia finale to feature three finalists and the first hosted by Kyle Sandilands and Jackie O.

=== Season changes ===
Starting this season, new hosts Kyle Sandilands and Jackie O replaced Gretel Killeen, who had hosted since the show's launch in 2001. Sandilands notably previously appeared as a Housemate on Celebrity Big Brother and was a house guest on Big Brother 2007. The nomination and eviction processes were changed for this season and those elements were both covered in the same weekly episode of the program. In previous seasons nominations and evictions were conducted separately and each had a weekly special dedicated to them. Big Brother: UpLate did not air this season due to Ten's late night programming schedule being used for Indian Premier League cricket telecasts in May and June. In comparison to 2007's broadcast, this season saw 11 hours less free-to-air telecasts a week, solely due to the absence of Mike Goldman's Big Brother: UpLate.

Television broadcast episodes featured a slightly updated logo and graphics, and much shorter theme music intros to each show. The free internet streaming was also changed. The time allotted to free streaming was cut to three five-minute blocks per-day. The full-membership subscriptions cost around A$33.00.

=== Big Mouth ===
A new panel discussion program titled Big Brother's Big Mouth was hosted by Tony Squires and Rebecca Wilson. This show was similar in format to the UK Big Brother panel show of the same name. It screened Monday nights, initially at 9:30 pm before being moved later due to low ratings. The program included material previously featured in Big Brother: Uncut. It featured former housemates and guests, including Tim Brunero (2005) and Paul Dyer (2004). With its MA15+ classification, the show used previously unseen footage from the house where editorially justified and served as a platform for discussion of adult content. The program was described as providing “exclusive scenes, access-all-areas coverage, and discussion of housemates’ actions, both positive and negative,” with no topic considered too sensitive for the panel.

=== The House ===
The House was rebuilt with a new layout as has occurred with most seasons of Big Brother Australia. The bedroom contained just one big bed for all housemates to share. The garden featured a Volkswagen Type 2 in which one housemate had to sleep. There was also a vending machine in the garden. The housemates could buy various items such as snacks, and sunglasses. Coins for the vending machine were distributed to housemates as a reward for sustaining good behaviour.

== Nomination and eviction voting format ==
In the previous season of Big Brother, housemates nominated two other housemates for eviction and viewers then voted to actually evict. In this season the nominations were based on viewer votes collected through the week. The public were only able to vote for which housemate to save from eviction. The three housemates with the fewest save votes were nominated for eviction on Sunday. The housemates then voted to evict one of these three. Housemates gave two points to one person they want evicted, and one point to another of the three.

The winner of Friday Night Games had the power to remove one nominated housemate from the nomination lineup, after which the housemate(s) in fourth place moved into the nomination lineup. In awarding eviction points, the winner could award four points to one person, and two points to another.

After five weeks, the nomination and eviction process reverted to the traditional format of all previous seasons: the housemates nominate, and viewers vote for the housemate to be evicted. Unlike the preceding few seasons, there was no save vote for nominated housemates; viewers could only vote to evict.

At the start of this season, Big Brother announced to the housemates that "snap evictions" will be executed at various points during the show. Terri was evicted on the first night in what was described as a "snap eviction", but she was soon returned to the house. Two of the three viewer-voted housemates, Barney and Michael, were quickly removed in what was described by the show's makers as a "snap eviction". In the final week, housemates were asked to vote to evict two housemates in a surprise "snap eviction". Alice and Travis were "evicted" and moved to another section of the compound. Later, it was revealed to Alice and Travis, and then the other housemates, that this eviction was fake and Alice and Travis returned to the main House.

== Housemates ==
It was initially confirmed that there would be 18 housemates this season. A young Afghan Muslim housemate withdrew from the show before it began. Big Brother executive producer Virginia Hodgson stated that he was originally selected as a housemate but was unable to participate due to personal and family reasons. Ultimately, 14 housemates entered the house on the opening night – three housemates voted on during the audition process entered during the first week, while three intruders entered during the sixth week.

Name	Age on entry	Hometown	Day entered	Day exited	Result
Terri Munro	52	North Richmond, New South Wales	0	1	Winner (Note: Terri was originally evicted from the house on Day 1, before re-entering the house on Day 7.)
Terri Munro	52	North Richmond, New South Wales	7	85	Winner
Rory Ammon	21	Geelong, Victoria	0	85	Runner-up
Ben McCallum	19	Western Australia	0	85	3rd place
Alice Redwood	25	Bendigo, Victoria	0	84	Evicted
Travis Keyser	20	Liverpool, New South Wales	0	84	Evicted
Edward Cherry	22	Gold Coast, Queensland	35	77	Evicted
Brigitte Stavaruk	20	Canberra, Australian Capital Territory	0	73	Evicted
Bianca Benigno	18	Queensland	0	70	Evicted
Terrence Hardie	51	Perth, Western Australia	35	63	Evicted
Nobuyuki "Nobbi" Tanaka	21	Victoria	0	56	Evicted
Rhianna Baxter	25	New South Wales	35	49	Evicted
Renee Black	22	Dubbo, New South Wales	0	42	Evicted
Dixie Crawford	21	Dubbo, New South Wales	0	35	Evicted
David Tchappat	32	New South Wales	0	28	Evicted
Nathan Strempel	27	South Australia	7	28	Evicted
Rebecca Morgan	22	Western Australia	0	21	Evicted
Saxon Pepper	22	South Australia	0	14	Evicted
Barney Barnett	32	Western Australia	7	10	Evicted
Michael Crafter	26	Victoria	7	10	Evicted
Rima Hadchiti	25	Victoria	0	5	Walked

== House guests ==
There were several celebrity guests appearances featured during this season. Carson Kressley arrived and gave the housemates a makeover to promote his new show, How to Look Good Naked. He stayed for only several hours. Former housemate Rima returned briefly late in the show. Rima was originally a housemate, but left after breaking her leg on the first Friday Night Live games. She returned on Day 63 with a special task of telling the housemates that there was a mole among them. She left on Day 66 after a four-day return.

Pamela Anderson entered as a guest on Day 73, then returned the following day for a special task. She did not stay in the house overnight. When asked how much she was paid to do the show, she said, "Much more than I am worth" and "I don't want to say how much but it is a lot." The day after her first Big Brother appearance, Anderson took part in a campaign against alleged KFC cruelty outside Southport KFC Restaurant, Gold Coast, where she hand-delivered a letter to the manager opposing expressing her concerns. Anderson's appearance generated the highest ratings of the entire season to that time.

== Friday Night Live themes and winners ==
Week	Theme	Winner	Runner up
1	Out of This World	Nobbi	Brigitte
2	Hip-Hop	Nathan	Travis
3	Celebrities	Rebecca	Nathan
4	Scouts	Alice	Terri
5	A Day at the Races	Renee	Nobbi
6	Superheroes	Nobbi	Bianca
7	Friday the 13th	Nobbi	Travis
8	Heavy Metal	Brigitte	Travis
9	Spy Night	Cherry	Brigitte
10	I Love New York	Cherry	Bianca
11	Circus Night	Ben	Travis
12	Playing to Win	Rory	Travis

== Reception ==
After the telecast of the season's third eviction show, critic Andrew Mercado summarised the 2008 season eviction shows, which he described as in previous seasons being a viewing highlight of the season, as having descended into "just a boring, hateful shemozzle, where Kyle insults everybody around him (housemates are psychos, the crew are work experience and the audience is a 'pack of pigs')." The 2008 season showed a marked downturn in ratings for the program. Another commentator, Peter Craven, described the 2008 season as being increasingly gimmicky. The visit by Carson Kressley to make over the housemates was seen as an obvious gimmick; when Kressley made a second appearance in another makeover episode screened several days later, Craven felt that it looked forced.

Both the Daily Show and the eviction shows rated significantly lower than previous seasons. Ratings for the first 2008 eviction were half those achieved by eviction shows during the program's peak. Academic Alan McKee singled-out the departure of previous host Gretel Killeen as having weakened the season. McKee judged that Killeen had successfully provided the show's "moral centre". Of the replacement hosts, McKee said that "Kyle and Jackie O just don't serve the same purpose. Jackie is quite limp and Kyle prides himself on just being wrong—he will always say the wrong, obnoxious thing and hurt people." By the eviction show on 1 June 2008, the program's ratings were said to have "almost flatlined on Sunday night, dropping below 500,000 in the key demographic along the East Coast."

The visit by hypnotist Peter Powers (Craven erroneously named Derren Brown as the hypnotist visitor) was described as being "riveting", but also as turning Big Brother into more a variety show. The choice of eccentric housemates and an appearance by Corey Worthington was seen as an attempt "to highlight the superficially weird" while the absence of Uplate and Uncut for 2008 was judged by Craven as being a mistake. Craven suggested the worst mistake of the season was replacing Gretel Killeen, whom Craven praised for being "formidable and charismatic" and skilled at her role, with new hosts. Craven judged Kyle Sandilands the more intelligent of the new hosts, but noted he gave no impression of having kept up with the show, as Killeen always did. Craven believed Sandilands to be "sensationally ill-suited to the format, which requires a warm embrace of the Big Brother ethos. By contrast, Jackie O, as the good cop was seen all vapid smiles and gooey attentiveness."

In a news report where the season was described as suffering a "ratings slump" and where the new hosts were said to have been unable to save the show, former host Killeen was quoted as saying she refused to watch the current season and refused to comment on its low ratings. "I haven't watched it because I don't want to be in the situation where I am not telling the truth and I know people will want to know my opinion of it and I think it is much better not to have seen it," Killeen said. "I don't think it's dignified for me to come back and say this should be done like this and this should be changed."

=== Ratings ===
	Viewers (millions) 5-City Metro												
	Week 1	Week 2	Week 3	Week 4	Week 5	Week 6	Week 7	Week 8	Week 9	Week 10	Week 11	Week 12	Week 13
Sunday		0.98 (Daily)	**0.87 (Daily)**	0.77 (Daily)	**0.80 (Daily**)	0.84 (Daily)	0.78 (Daily)	0.73 (Daily)	0.69 (Daily)	1.01 (Daily)	0.92 (Daily)	1.03 (Daily)	**1.04 (Daily)**
Sunday		1.12 (The Gatecrashers)	**1.00 (Eviction**)	0.96 (Eviction)	**1.02 (Eviction)**	0.98 (Eviction)	0.89 (Eviction)	0.84 (Eviction)	0.80 (Eviction)	1.38 (Pammy Busts In/Eviction)	1.03 (Eviction)	1.09 (Eviction)	**1.11 (Eviction)**
Monday	1.53 (Launch)	0.88	**0.76**	0.71	**0.73**	0.76	0.70	0.66	0.61	0.90	0.83	0.89	**1.50 (Finale)**
Monday	1.53 (Launch)	0.68 (Big Mouth)	**0.51 (Big Mouth)**	0.44 (Big Mouth)	**0.40 (Big Mouth)**	0.41 (Big Mouth)	0.37 (Big Mouth)	0.33 (Big Mouth)	0.29 (Big Mouth)	0.36 (Big Mouth)	0.33 (Big Mouth)	0.39 (Big Mouth)	
Tuesday	0.91	0.79	**0.79**	0.73	**0.69**	0.74	0.66	0.62	0.59	0.68	0.70	0.71	
Wednesday	0.83	0.85	**0.80**	0.77	**0.75**	0.71	0.67	0.63	0.62	0.70	0.70	0.69	
Thursday	0.80	0.90	**0.88**	0.88	**0.83**	0.80	0.74	0.70	0.68	0.77	0.80	0.87	
Friday	0.94	0.94	**0.97**	0.94	**0.90**	0.90	0.84	0.79	0.74	0.80	0.83	0.91	
Friday	1.12 (FNL)	1.01 (FNL)	**1.01 (FNL)**	0.99 (FNL)	**0.96 (FNL)**	0.98 (FNL)	0.89 (FNL)	0.85 (FNL)	0.78 (FNL)	0.91 (FNL)	0.93 (FNL)	1.15 (FNL)	
Weekly average	1.02	0.93	**0.89**	0.84	**0.84**	0.84	0.77	0.73	0.69	0.89	0.73	0.92	**1.12**
Running average	1.02	0.98	**0.95**	0.92	**0.90**	0.89	0.88	0.86	0.84	0.84	0.83	0.84	**0.86**
Season average	0.86m												

Ratings are rounded to the nearest ten thousand. Big Mouth Shows are not included in official averages. Figures in bold include consolidated viewing figures.

=== Cancellation ===
The season rated poorly, leading to the cancellation of the series, announced 13 July 2008. Ten's chief programmer, David Mott, admitted the season had recently experienced "audience erosion" and widespread criticism of the new hosts. Mott reasoned that after so many seasons there were few new surprises in the format, leading to reduced viewing figures. Mott defended the new hosts saying that the ratings for eviction shows held up. The lowest-rating component of the season was the Big Mouth late night weekly panel show. Its audience slipped to the half-a-million mark and it was moved to a later time slot. A new season of Big Brother was announced in 2011.

=== Controversies and incidents ===
- Travis Keyser, who was known for his high-pitched voice and soft-spoken nature, was thought to be a victim of bullying by the fans of the show. In one incident, Keyser suffered an eye injury after another housemate squirted bodywash in his eye, as he screamed in pain. Later, at the Friday Night Games, Travis felt progressively unwell and he disappeared at some point during the games, though Big Brother remained silent about it, before the official Big Brother website announced that Keyser was hospitalised. Though years later, Keyser revealed that he did not feel like he was bullied whilst in the house.
- This season's winner Teri Munro was labeled a "racist" and "xenophobic" for her comments in the show's promos, where she stated, "A lot of people that we've let come here have brought all their problems with them and now we're paying the price". Munro divided viewers of the show with her right-wing political ideas in a manner evocative of Pauline Hanson's public advent in 1996. Despite her right-wing politics, Munro was also against religion and critical of it. Because of her views, One Nation's NSW president Jim Cassidy commented in July 2008 that he was interested in talking to her.
- Bianca Benigno became involved in a heated argument with fellow housemate Renee over remarks about her large breasts, with the confrontation nearly escalating into a physical altercation. She later expressed regret over her behaviour, acknowledging that her response had been inappropriate.
- Host Kyle Sandilands called in sick for this program and his co-hosting duties were handled by usual show announcer and narrator Mike Goldman. Sandilands missed his second eviction show the following week, 8 June 2008, after again calling in sick, with a severe chest infection. It was reported that hundreds of fans took to message boards calling for Mike Goldman, his stand-in for the 1 June and 8 June eviction episodes, to become a permanent eviction host. Some speculated Sandilands had already been sacked; others accused him of faking his illness. A spokeswoman for the season said Sandilands was expected to return for the following eviction show. Sandilands revealed on his radio show years later that his illnesses were actually an addiction to cocaine.

== Weekly summary ==
Week 1	Events	On Day 0, the 14 Housemates entered the House on launch night. Each Housemate placed a valuable possession on the "Big Brother Memento Cabinet" before entering the House.; Big Brother informed the Housemates that a "snap eviction" would take place the next day at sunrise. The House was out of bounds until the snap eviction was over.; On Day 2, Big Brother gave evicted Housemate Terri a special power called the "Housemate Hand Grenade". With the Housemate Hand Grenade, Terri banished Nobbi to the Volkswagen van in the backyard. He was not allowed to enter the House unless invited by Big Brother.; On Day 5, during the first Friday Night Live games, Rima injured herself during a competition. After being seen by a medic, she was taken to the hospital, where X-rays revealed that she had broken her leg.
Week 1	Entrances	Alice, Ben, Bianca, Brigitte, David, Dixie, Nobbi, Rebecca, Renee, Rima, Rory, Saxon, Terri and Travis entered the House on Day 0.
Week 1	Exits	Terri was evicted from the House on Day 1 with 4 votes total out of 14.; Rima left the House due to an injury on Day 5.
Week 2	Events	On Day 9, Big Brother conducted a snap eviction. Terri accepted the task of deciding the evictees after Corey declined.; On Day 10, Terri was re-instated as a Housemate for completing her task to evict two housemates. Later in the day, Big Brother called all Housemates to the Diary Room and explained the new nomination and eviction process.
Week 2	Tasks	On Day 8, Big Brother set the Housemates a task to clean up a mess in the backyard placed by the show's makers after the Housemates went to bed. Each morning, the Housemates had one hour after Big Brother wakes up the House to clean the backyard.; On Day 9, Corey was given the task of evicting two of the three new Housemates. He declined the task and Big Brother then offered the task to Terri. If she executed this task, she would be re-instated as a Housemate. Terri accepted the task.
Week 2	Entrances	Barney, Michael and Nathan entered the House as Housemates on Day 7.; Terri and Corey entered the House as House Guests on Day 7.
Week 2	Exits	Barney and Michael were evicted from the House on Day 10.; Saxon was evicted from the House on Day 14 with 16 of 39 Points to evict.
Week 3	Events	On Day 15, Saxon handed the second Housemate Hand Grenade to Brigitte, which led to the indefinite removal of all her items.; On Day 15, Rory, Alice, David, and Renee were treated to a trip to "Bali": actually a specially decorated pool area within the Big Brother compound.; On Day 16, celebrity Carson Kressley entered the House to give Housemates makeovers.
Week 3	Tasks	On Day 15, Housemates were assigned the Cricket Task: three Housemates at a time had to stand in the backyard facing a ball launcher and attempt to catch the ball when it is ejected. They had to wear the proper gear at all times while on the field, and show great enthusiasm when catching a ball.
Week 3	Exits	On Day 19, House Guest Corey left the House.; On Day 21, Rebecca was evicted from the house after receiving 22 out of 42 possible points.
Week 4	Events	On Day 22, Rebecca handed the third Housemate Hand Grenade to Dixie; she had to do all of the Housemates clothes.; On Day 27, So You Think You Can Dance judges Matt Lee and Jason Coleman judged the Dance Task.
Week 4	Tasks	On Day 22, the Dance Task was assigned. Split into couples, the housemates had to learn a dance and perform it together, with their performance judged by the judges from talent show So You Think You Can Dance.
Week 4	Exits	On Day 28, Nathan and David were evicted in a surprise double eviction.
Week 5	Events	On Day 29, David handed the fourth Hand Grenade to Bianca, designating her as the night watchwoman. Nathan handed the fifth Hand Grenade to Travis, requiring him to be the first to rise each morning. Thereafter, he is unable to return to sleep.
Week 5	Task	Starting Day 29, Housemates had to maintain the training of a seeing eye dog from Seeing Eye Dogs Australia. Alice named the dog Ollie.
Week 5	Exits	On Day 33, Travis was squirted in the eye with shampoo as he came out of the toilet as a prank played by Ben that went wrong. He was then rushed to hospital but returned on day 35.; On Day 35, Dixie was evicted after receiving 14 out of a possible 33 points to evict. Usual host Kyle Sandilands did not host the eviction due to illness, and was replaced by Mike Goldman, who hosted with Jackie O.
Week 6	Events	On Day 35, the voting format changed. Housemates nominate for eviction, and the nominated housemates are then evicted by the public.; On Day 36, Dixie's Hand Grenade was to save one of the three nominated Housemates. She saved Alice. This moved Renee and Terri into the list of nominated Housemates.
Week 6	Task	On Day 36, the Ignore the Obvious Task was assigned. Housemates were to ignore obvious unusual occurrences in the House, such as a fireworks display, A marching band entering the house, Scottish dancers dancing along to the bagpipes, a platter with $2,000 with a sign saying "Free Money", Housemates' relatives shown in footage on the House TV screen, and Brigitte's name constantly called out by a voice-over.
Week 6	Entrances	Intruders Cherry, Rhianna and Terrence entered the House on Day 35.; On Day 36, Travis returned to the House after receiving medical treatment.
Week 6	Exits	On Day 41, Ollie, the seeing-eye dog, left the House.; On Day 42, Renee was evicted with 37.9% to evict. Kyle Sandilands was again replaced by Mike Goldman as Jackie O's co-host for the eviction show, reportedly again due to illness.
Week 7	Events	On Day 43, Renee handed the sixth Hand Grenade to Brigitte. This hand grenade denied her a family message that all Housemates were to receive.; Brigitte celebrated her 21st birthday on Day 48 with a Sparkle theme. As a present, Big Brother returned confiscated stuffed toy Princess Sparkles to Brigitte.
Week 7	Task	Day 43, The Salon Task was assigned to the Housemates. 24 hours a day, Housemates took turns at being hairdresser, and being the person getting a hairdo, keeping up the salon chit chat the whole time.
Week 7	Exit	On Day 49, Rhianna was evicted with 37.7% to evict.
Week 8	Events	On Day 50, Rhianna handed the seventh Hand Grenade to Cherry, making him the new house maid.; Housemates discovered the Grand Prize within the Diary Room chair, $250,000. Each Housemate received $25,000 at that point, and if evicted, has to give their money to the remaining housemate of their choice.
Week 8	Task	On Day 50, while the other Housemates took part in a decoy task involving rowing away from a shark, Nobbi and Bianca were assigned the real task, becoming Moon Monks. They had to go out at 2:00 a.m. each morning to worship the moon and to recruit a new member to the cult each night, without letting the other Housemates find out.
Week 8	Exit	On Day 56, Nobbi was evicted with 59.1% of votes from the public.
Week 9	Events	On Day 57, Nobbi used his Hand Grenade to put Terri and Terrence both in the Kombi van.
Week 9	Entrances	Rima re-entered the house on Day 63.
Week 9	Task	The "Trainspotting" Task required Housemates to wait at a train station set built on the stage until a model train appeared from a tunnel. They had to remember the numbers on the trains to pass the task.
Week 9	Exit	On Day 63, Terence was evicted from the Big Brother House with 41.7% to evict.
Week 10	Events	On Day 64, Terrence used his Hand Grenade to allow Terri back into the house. He also gave her his $25,000 prize share and confiscated the hair straightener.
Week 10	Task	The Housemates become wrestlers with a "deadly ninja" opponent—a large stuffed toy. Whenever a Housemate hears their "theme song", they had 90 seconds to put on their costume and get out into the ring to fight the ninja.; Rima returned and told the Housemates that one of the Housemates was actually a mole and they had three days to decide who it was. If they chose correctly, the mole would be evicted. If not, the mole could stay and would be eligible to win the prize if not evicted in the normal course. Most housemates ultimately decided Brigitte was the mole. However, Cherry believed it was Alice. Rima then appeared on a video screen inside the House, revealing to housemates that on her return, she was not a Housemate, and was ineligible to win the money. She revealed she had now left the House and that there was no mole: her mission was to create drama and tension amongst the Housemates. This was greeted by much outrage, especially by Bianca.
Week 10	Exit	Rima exited the house on Day 66.; On Day 70, Bianca was evicted from the Big Brother House.
Week 11	Events	Celebrity Pamela Anderson entered the house on Day 73. She was in and out of the house for 3 days.; On Day 77, Network Ten announced to the public that Big Brother had been axed.; On Day 77, Housemates were asked to vote to evict two Housemates in a surprise "snap eviction". Alice and Travis were "evicted" and moved to another section of the compound. Later, it was revealed to Alice and Travis, and then the other Housemates, that this eviction was fake and Alice and Travis returned to the House.
Week 11	Task	Housemates were paired up and must, at prescribed intervals and within limited time, become paparazzi and track down "celebrities" (either photographs of actual celebrities, or impersonators) briefly appearing in the internal windows and mirrors of the House.
Week 11	Exits	Brigitte was evicted from the Big Brother House on Day 73.; Cherry was evicted from the Big Brother House on Day 77.
Week 12	Events	After Cherry's eviction Housemates had to conduct two housemate-voted evictions; Alice and Travis were evicted; later this eviction was revealed as fake and they had never actually left the compound.; Terri was announced the winner of Big Brother 2008, and Rory as the Runner-Up.
Week 12	Task	Housemates were required to iron a large quantity of clothes while wearing special uniforms.
Week 12	Exits	Alice and Travis were both evicted on Day 84.; Rory, Ben and Terri exited the Big Brother House after 85 Days.

== Voting and nominations table ==
The voting format this season was split into two phases:

- From Week 2 to 5, the public voted for whom to save from nomination. The bottom three housemates with the fewest votes were up for eviction. On eviction night, the housemates then voted for whom to evict, designating 2 points to their first vote and 1 point for their second vote. Nominees were permitted to cast eviction points for themselves. The nominee (or nominees in the event of a double eviction) with the most points was then evicted. This year, the weekly winner of the Friday Night Games was also named Head of House. They had the power to save someone in the bottom three from eviction, with the housemate receiving the next fewest votes becoming the replacement nominee. The Head of House also votes with double eviction points.
- From Week 6 onwards, the voting system reverted to the original format. Housemates nominated each other for eviction (with their first nomination receiving 2 points and the second receiving 1 point), and the three or more housemates with the most points faced the public vote. Housemates were no longer permitted to nominate themselves. The Head of House no longer had double nomination points, but could still save a nominee (with the housemate or housemates with the next highest point totals being the replacement nominee).

	Voting to Evict Phase						Nominate to Evict Phase									
	Week 1	Week 2		Week 3	Week 4	Week 5	Week 6	Week 7	Week 8	Week 9	Week 10	Week 11		Week 12		
	Week 1	Day 10	Day 14	Week 3	Week 4	Week 5	Week 6	Week 7	Week 8	Week 9	Week 10	Day 73	Day 77	Day 84	Day 85	
Head of House	Nobbi	~~Nathan~~; Travis		Rebecca	~~Rebecca~~; Alice	Renee		Nobbi	Nobbi	Brigitte	Cherry		Ben	none		
Public Nominations	none		David; Rebecca; Saxon	Ben; Rory; Travis	Alice; David; Nathan	Alice; Bianca; Dixie	none									
Saved	none		Rebecca	Travis	Alice	Alice	none									
Public Nominations (post-HoH)	none		David; Saxon; Rory	Ben; Rebecca; Terri	David; Nathan; Rory	Bianca; Dixie; Nobbi	none									
Automatic Nomination	All; Housemates	Barney; Michael; Nathan	none													
Terri	Nobbi	Barney; Michael	Exempt	Ben; Rebecca	Nathan; David	Bianca; Dixie	Renee; Nobbi	Nobbi; Bianca	Terrence; Bianca	Rory; Bianca	Bianca; Rory	Rory; Cherry	No nominations	No nominations	Winner (Day 85)	
Rory	Terri	Not eligible	David; Saxon	Rebecca; Ben	Nathan; David	Dixie; Bianca	Brigitte; Terri	Alice; Brigitte	Brigitte; Cherry	Travis; Brigitte	Alice; Brigitte	Brigitte; Cherry	No nominations	No nominations	Runner-Up (Day 85)	
Ben	Terri	Not eligible	David; Saxon	Rebecca; Rory	David; Nathan	Dixie; Bianca	Alice; Brigitte	Alice; Cherry	Alice; Cherry	Brigitte; Alice	Travis; Alice	Alice; Cherry	No nominations	No nominations	Third place (Day 85)	
Alice	Ben	Not eligible	Saxon; Rory	Rebecca; Rory	Nathan; David	Bianca; Nobbi	Bianca; Travis	Nobbi; Ben	Ben; Rory	Bianca; Ben	Bianca; Rory	Rory; Ben	No nominations	No nominations	Evicted (Day 84)	
Travis	Rory	Not eligible	David; Rory	Rory; Ben	David; Nathan	Dixie; Nobbi	Brigitte; Renee	Nobbi; Ben	Terri; Terrence	Terrence; Rory	Bianca; Rory	Terri; Rory	No nominations	No nominations	Evicted (Day 84)	
Cherry	Not in House						Exempt	Terrence; Rhianna	Rory; Nobbi	Rory; Ben	Rory; Bianca	Ben; Rory	No nominations	Evicted (Day 77)		
Brigitte	Rima	Not eligible	Saxon; Rory	Ben; Rory	Nathan; Rory	Bianca; Dixie	Ben; Nobbi	Nobbi; Cherry	Nobbi; Rory	Terrence; Rory	Rory; Ben	Rory; Terri	Evicted (Day 73)			
Bianca	Nobbi	Not eligible	Saxon; David	Rebecca; Ben	David; Nathan	Dixie; Nobbi	Alice; Terri	Terrence; Terri	Terrence; Terri	Terrence; Terri	Terri; Alice	Evicted (Day 70)				
Terrence	Not in House						Exempt	Cherry; Rhianna	Cherry; Brigitte	Brigitte; Alice	Evicted (Day 63)					
Nobbi	Terri	Not eligible	David; Rory	Rebecca; Ben	Nathan; David	Dixie; Bianca	Alice; Terri	Rhianna; Alice	Alice; Cherry	Evicted (Day 56)						
Rhianna	Not in House						Exempt	Terrence; Brigitte	Evicted (Day 49)							
Renee	David	Not eligible	Saxon; David	Rebecca; Ben	Rory; David	Nobbi; Bianca	Bianca; Brigitte	Evicted (Day 42)								
Dixie	Brigitte	Not eligible	Saxon; David	Rebecca; Ben	Nathan; Rory	Dixie; Bianca	Evicted (Day 35)									
David	Ben	Not eligible	Saxon; Rory	Ben; Rebecca	Rory; Nathan	Evicted (Day 28)										
Nathan	Not in House	Not eligible	Exempt	Rebecca; Ben	David; Rory	Evicted (Day 28)										
Rebecca	Ben	Not eligible	Saxon; Rory	Rebecca; Ben	Evicted (Day 21)											
Saxon	Terri	Not eligible	David; Rory	Evicted (Day 14)												
Barney	Not in House	Not eligible	Evicted (Day 10)													
Michael	Not in House	Not eligible	Evicted (Day 10)													
Rima	Brigitte	Walked (Injured) (Day 5)									Guest (Day 63–66)	Left (Day 66)				
Notes		,	,					none						none		
Housemate Nominations	none						Alice; Bianca; Brigitte	Alice; Nobbi; Terrence	Alice; Cherry; Rory; Terrence	Brigitte; Rory; Terrence	Alice; Bianca; Rory	Ben; Cherry; Rory; Terri	All; Housemates			
Saved	none						Alice	Nobbi	Rory	Brigitte	Alice	Cherry	All; Housemates			
Housemate Nominations (post-HoH)	none						Bianca; Brigitte; Renee; Terri	Alice; Cherry; Rhianna; Terrence	Alice; Brigitte; Cherry; Nobbi; Terrence; Terri	Bianca; Rory; Terrence	Bianca; Rory; Terri; Travis	Alice; Ben; Brigitte; Rory; Terri	All; Housemates			
Walked	Rima	none														
Evicted	Terri; 4 of 14 votes to evict	Barney & Michael; Terri's choices to evict	Saxon; 16 of 39 points to evict	Rebecca; 22 of 42 points to evict	Nathan; 18 of 39 points to evict	Dixie; 14 of 33 points to evict	Renee; 37.9% to evict	Rhianna; 37.7% to evict	Nobbi; 59.1% to evict	Terrence; 41.7% to evict	Bianca; 48.1% to evict	Brigitte; 29.7% to evict	Cherry; 50.5% to evict	Travis; 31.4% to evict	Ben; Most votes to evict	Rory; Most votes to evict
Evicted	Terri; 4 of 14 votes to evict	Barney & Michael; Terri's choices to evict	Saxon; 16 of 39 points to evict	Rebecca; 22 of 42 points to evict	David; 14 of 39 points to evict	Dixie; 14 of 33 points to evict	Renee; 37.9% to evict	Rhianna; 37.7% to evict	Nobbi; 59.1% to evict	Terrence; 41.7% to evict	Bianca; 48.1% to evict	Brigitte; 29.7% to evict	Cherry; 50.5% to evict	Alice; 21.3% to evict	Terri; Fewest votes to evict	

– A feature that was not in use at the time.

=== Notes ===
- ^1Big Brother revealed to the Housemates that someone will be evicted the next day. Housemates had to decide who would leave the House on Day 1. Rima was removed from the house after breaking her leg.
- ^2 Terri returned to the House along with Corey as House Guests. Big Brother set Terri a mission to be Corey's guardian during his time in the House. If successful, she would be re-instated as a Housemate. However, she failed this mission.
- ^3On Day 9, Big Brother announced another snap eviction. Corey was initially offered the task of deciding which two of the three housemates voted in by the Australian public would be evicted. Corey declined this task. It was then offered to Terri and she accepted the task after failing her original task given to her by Big Brother. After the eviction, Terri was re-instated as a Housemate.
- ^4On Day 12, during FNL, Big Brother announced the winner of FNL would also become Head of House, who would get to vote with double eviction points, and get a dinner for two in the Strategy Room, where they are allowed to talk about nominations and eviction. Nathan won FNL, but because he was exempt from eviction, runner-up Travis took his place.
- ^5Although Nathan won FNL, since he was exempt and couldn't vote, Big Brother gave the eviction duties of Head of House to the runner-up, Travis.
- ^6As Rebecca was evicted, she had to give her rights as HOH to another housemates. During her goodbye message, she gave the rights as HOH to Alice.
- ^7This week was a double eviction; the two Housemates with the highest points were evicted.
- ^8Intruders Cherry, Rhianna and Terrence entered the House on Day 35.
- ^9On Day 36, Brigitte (six points), Alice (six points) and Bianca (four points) were nominated for eviction. However, evicted Housemate Dixie used a Housemate Hand Grenade and saved Alice from eviction. Both Renee and Terri were then nominated in place of Alice. Both Terri and Renee had three nomination points total.
- ^10On Day 77, Alice and Travis were evicted. Later, this eviction was revealed as fake.
- ^11This year, the public voted for whom to evict, not win. The winner was the person with the fewest votes to evict.

=== Housemate Hand Grenades ===
This season, housemates evicted by the usual process are given the power to decide which housemate receives the penalty—or sometimes the benefit—which has been devised by Big Brother for that eviction. These are dubbed the 'Housemate Hand Grenade' by the makers of the show. Sometimes, the ruling is permanent. Rulings later removed are marked by (R).

Evicted Housemate	Hand Grenade	Recipient
Terri	Housemate must live in the Volkswagen Kombi for the rest of their time in the house.	Nobbi
Saxon	Housemate will lose all of their possessions indefinitely. (R)	Brigitte
Rebecca	Housemate is required to do everybody's laundry.	Dixie
Nathan	Housemate must wake up before all other housemates and serve Big Brother breakfast.	Travis
David	Housemate must be the last housemate to go to bed every night. (R)	Bianca
Big Brother	Housemates will now nominate and the public will vote to evict.	All Housemates
Dixie	Housemate could save one nominated Housemate from eviction.	Alice
Renee	Housemate would not receive a message from home.	Brigitte
Rhianna	Housemate required to all washing up and clean toilets every day. (R)	Cherry
Nobbi	Two housemates must live in the Volkswagen Kombi van until further notice. (R)	Terri and Terrence
Terrence	Reversal of Nobbi's Grenade; removal of hair straightener from the house.	Terri; All housemates
Rima	Housemates are told there is not a mole in the house.	All housemates
Bianca	Housemate will become the house chef until further notice. (R)	Ben
Brigitte	Housemate must eat only simple staple food prepared by Big Brother indefinitely. (R)	Rory
Cherry	Cherry presented the announcement that Big Brother would be conducting a housemate-voted eviction that evening.	All housemates had to vote; Alice was fake evicted.
Alice	Alice presented the announcement that Big Brother would be conducting another housemate-voted eviction that evening.	All housemates had to vote; Travis was fake evicted.
Alice & Travis	Alice and Travis returned to the game.	All housemates

== Special episodes ==
A number of special episodes aired during the original run of the season. These included:
