= Big Brother 6 nominations table =

Big Brother 6 nominations table may refer to:

- Big Brother Australia 2006 nominations table
- Big Brother 2005 nominations table (UK)
