= Big Brother (Australian TV series) season 7 =

Big Brother
- Season 7
- Presented by: Gretel Killeen
- No. of days: 100
- No. of housemates: 24
- Winner: Aleisha Cowcher
- Runner-up: Zach Douglas
- Companion shows: Big Brother Nominations; Big Brother: UpLate; Friday Night Live
- No. of episodes: 129 (+ 81 UpLate)

Release
- Original network: Network Ten
- Original release: 22 April – 30 July 2007

Season chronology
- ← Previous; Season 6 Next → Season 8

The seventh season of the Australian reality television series, Big Brother, also known as Big Brother 2007, began on 22 April 2007. Despite a drop in ratings compared to previous seasons, and a number of controversies, the then Big Brother executive producer Kris Noble considers the year's season a success.

During the 2007 series, Nick Colquhoun served as the primary voice of Big Brother. As in the previous two seasons, Colquhoun portrayed Big Brother with a stricter and more authoritarian tone, continuing the more intimidating style that had been introduced in 2005. Throughout the season, Big Brother maintained the firm disciplinary approach established in earlier series, frequently enforcing house rules and issuing fines or punishments when housemates breached them.

At the end of this season's finale broadcast 30 July 2007, it was announced by host Gretel Killeen that Big Brother would be returning for an eighth season in 2008. although she did not return. In the finale Aleisha Cowcher was announced as the winner. She won by the closest winning margin ever in the Australian version. The news the following day reported a margin of 51% versus 49% – a difference of 65 votes. This was the last season hosted by Gretel Killeen.

== Development ==
During the sixth-season finale, a seventh season of the show was confirmed. Auditions were held throughout November and December 2006, taking place in Brisbane, Sydney, Melbourne, Adelaide, Perth, Hobart, and Darwin. The house this season was confirmed to have an 'eco-friendly' theme and style; It featured a pedal-powered washing machine, a rubber garden turf made from recycled car tyres and carpets made from goat hair. On 18 April 2007, after housemates were put into lockdown, it was revealed that there would be no prize money this season. The launch date of the seventh season was rumoured to be 22 April 2007. These rumours were later confirmed.

=== No housemates on Rove ===
Housemates this season were not featured as guests on variety/talk show Rove. Previously housemates would appear on Rove in the days following their eviction. As of 2007 Rove aired on Sunday nights at 8:30, immediately after the Big Brother eviction show. As Rove is taped in Melbourne, Victoria it was impossible for the housemates to travel so quickly to appear on both shows (it is normally a two-to-three-hour flight from the Gold Coast to Melbourne). Even so, Rove chose not to cross to evicted contestants following the eviction shows, as Rove would not start airing immediately after Big Brother.

== Format ==
Like other seasons of the show, the series revolves around a group of strangers living in a house together with no communication with the outside world. Referred to as "housemates", the group is constantly filmed during their time in the house and are not permitted to communicate with those filming them, except with the titular "Big Brother" – an embodiment of the show's producers.

Every week, the housemates would vote who they wished to leave the house, and those with the most votes are nominated for eviction, with the Australian public voting for which nominees should be evicted, with the evictee leaving during a live show. This process continued until only one housemate remained to win the grand prize.

=== Twists ===
Big Brother 2007 introduced several new elements not seen in previous seasons of the series.

=== Prize money ===
Big Brother originally informed the housemates that there was zero prize money. Later they were informed that they could earn prize money by completing various tasks (similar to that of The Mole). This was revealed at the conclusion of the secret relationship twist.

=== Secret Relationships ===
It was revealed on the Game On episode that housemates Hayley and Andrew were secretly in a relationship. Big Brother set the task to both housemates to enter the house and keep their relationship secret for one week. If successful in this task both would be allowed stay in the house; if they failed then one of them would be evicted. All other housemates had individually been challenged by Big Brother to secretly discover who was in a secret relationship, each believing they were the only housemate to be issued this challenge. Housemate Billy was added on Day 2. Billy is Hayley's former boyfriend and was added specifically to complicate her task of keeping her relationship with Andrew secret. Hayley was not allowed to inform anyone, including Andrew, of Billy's true status. Each day he received a mission from Big Brother to put pressure on Hayley's secret challenge.

==== Billy's Tasks ====
1. Day 2: Before Billy went to bed, he had to say "Goodnight Hayley, sweet dreams".
2. Day 3: From the moment Hayley woke up, Billy had to "wait on her hand and foot" and become her best friend. He also had to pick a bunch of flowers from the garden and give them to Hayley, and ask her to help pick the herbs.
3. Day 4: When Billy was asked to take a housemate with him to tend the animals, he had to choose Hayley.
4. Day 5: Billy had to become Andrew's best friend.

Big Brother confirmed on Day 8 that Billy's mission was an overall success, and his reward was becoming an official Big Brother 2007 housemate (who could compete to win the show) on Day 16. On 29 April episode, Big Brother revealed the secret relationship. Three housemates had correctly guessed Hayley and Billy were involved. As fewer than half of the housemates had guessed correctly, Big Brother deemed Hayley and Andrew as successful in their challenge so both were allowed to stay. Big Brother also revealed that as Hayley and Andrew had completed their task successfully $50,000 had been awarded into the prize pool.

=== White Room ===
On 23 April 2007, the four remaining wild-card housemates not selected to enter the House via the public vote on Days 1 and 2 were isolated in the "White Room". The housemates were Cruz, Demet, Kara, and Harrison. The White Room and its fixtures and fittings were all entirely white, and the housemates had only white clothes to wear. White Room housemates were provided with a white porridge which fulfilled all nutritional needs. In the centre of the room was a red button. At any time, a housemate could press the red button if they wished to leave. This decision to leave was final and the quitting housemate could not return to the Big Brother House or the White Room. The challenge was that the housemate who stayed in the White Room the longest without pressing the red button would become a legitimate Big Brother housemate and enter the main house with the rest of the housemates.Monitors in the Big Brother House allowed the housemates to watch, without audio, the White Room housemates at all times. The White Room housemates were unaware that they were being watched by the Big Brother housemates.

Cruz was the first white room resident evicted when he pressed the red button after accepting a $750 bribe from Big Brother to whoever pushed the red button first. After Cruz accepted the Bribe, no one else volunteered to leave.

On Day 11 and after 9 days in the White Room, Big Brother told the remaining three White Room housemates that one would enter the House that night, first Big Brother instructed them to vote one of their own off - Kara was evicted when Harrison and Demet voted against her. Then, the Big Brother housemates, after watching the White Room Finalists compete in a Heights Challenge (similar to the Final Challenge from the First Friday Night Live), voted between the White Room Final 2 on who they wanted to enter the house. Demet was voted into the house in an 8–6 vote and became an official housemate.

==== Housemates' voting ====
- Demet: Aleisha, Andrew, Emma, Hayley, Jamie, Joel, Kate, Rebecca
- Harrison: Bodie, Susannah, TJ, Thomas, Travis, Zoran

=== Big Brother Starburst Golden Key ===
On 29 January 2007, Network Ten, Endemol Southern Star, and Masterfoods announced "Australia's biggest ever integrated television promotion", the Big Brother Starburst Golden Key. This was modeled after a similar promotion on Big Brother UK 7, which would allow a member of the public to enter the Big Brother House as a Housemate via golden tickets in Kit Kat bars. During the promotion, 100 packets of Starburst featured a "Golden Key" - the concept was similar to the Golden Tickets in the story Charlie and the Chocolate Factory. These keys were in the form of a unique alphanumeric code. One hundred codes awarded the holder an all-expenses-paid holiday to the Gold Coast, during which they would participate in a special audition.

During a live special episode called "Golden Key", the 100 winners gathered in the Audience to discover who among them would be selected as the 5 Finalists based on the auditions as well as police and medical checks. By random draw, one Finalist would become a housemate, finding a Golden Key in a randomly selected box of Starburst and be eligible to win the season and all prizes. On Day 18, Nick Sady was announced the "Golden Key" winner and entered the Big Brother House.

=== Friday Night Live Changes ===
This year, the winner of Friday Night Live was given greater power in nominations. Replacing the Three Point Twist of previous seasons, the Friday Night Live winner each week this season was required to choose one nominated housemate to be removed from the nomination line-up, and to nominate another to replace them - unlike past seasons, the outcome of their save and nomination was only revleaed to the Housemates shortly before the Sunday Eviction. The winner of Friday Night Live this season was also given the chance to discuss their nominations, both past and present, with their chosen housemate whilst inside the Rewards Room.

=== Nominations ===
==== Week 11 - Australia Cast Nominations Points ====
The public were able to vote for a Housemate to nomination via SMS for 2 July nominations. The housemate with the most votes received two nomination points, and the next housemate received one point. With the tally counted, Michelle had the most votes from the public and so received an extra two nomination points. Daniela received an extra nomination point. As winner of Friday Night Games Daniela had the power of saving one housemate from eviction. She saved herself.

==== Week 12 - Australia Nominates & the Housemates Vote to Evict ====
Big Brother changed the usual format for Week 12 nominations. For this week viewers could nominate housemates, and from the nominated housemates the housemates themselves could vote to evict, reversing the usual procedure. While housemates were put through the usual nomination procedure and their nominations were screened, unknown to them, their nominations were ignored. Viewer nomination points were counted. On Sunday's eviction, the housemates were surprised by this twist, and then were individually asked to nominate to evict any of the nominated housemates. The nominated housemate with the most votes was to be evicted. Daniela was evicted with a total of 12 points.

== The House ==
=== Storeroom ===
All staple foods provided to housemates this year were vegan. The housemates could supplement this with milk and eggs supplied from the farm yard and herbs and mushrooms from the herb garden.

=== Telephone ===
For the first time Big Brother Australia featured a telephone in the house. It was situated in the lounge and was shown on the Opening Night broadcast before the housemates entered the house. On Day 37, Big Brother informed housemates that if the phone rang only one housemate could answer it. Joel was nominated to answer it on the housemates' behalf. On Day 52 Joel received a call from Big Brother advising that he would be away from the house and would communicate via the phone to Joel at various times. On Day 58 Andrew picked up the phone as a joke, and was penalised by being sent to the Punishment Room to polish boots. Michelle joined him in the Punishment Room due to the weekly task which involved housemates remaining partnered. On Day 97 the housemates were allowed to speak with several of the Big Brother UK 8 housemates. The UK Big Brother House also had a telephone and unlike the Australian version this was the first time the phone was used in the UK version.

=== Chill Out Room ===
Adjacent to the kitchen was a new room called the "Chill Out Room". As an official rule, no more than three housemates were allowed in the room at a time. It provided a quiet place to talk or relax, away from the rest of the housemates.

== Housemates ==
In this season, producers selected housemates who were generally more sophisticated, modest, intelligent, and with a unique worldview - notable examples being Rebecca Dent, a devout Mormon, and Jamie McDonald, a computer geek. This contrasted with the 2005, 2006 editions and was more in line with the series' genuine "Social Experiment" intention. The change in casting was also an attempt to lower censorship controversies and reputational issues, which resulted from the housemates' overall lascivious and outlandish personality types from 2005 and 2006.

Over the 100-day season, a total of 24 housemates entered the Big Brother House, twelve during the opening night and a further twelve at various points throughout the series. On the opening night, viewers were given the opportunity to vote in two additional housemates, one male and one female, from a selection of six potential housemates, while the remaining four would be isolated in the White Room to compete to enter the house.

The following night, Susannah and Zoran were voted into the house by Australia, along with Billy, who was previously teased as "Mr X", entered the house as a guest with the purpose of jeopardising Andrew and Hayley's secret relationship challenge, as he was Hayley's ex. Billy was not officially recognised as a legitimate housemate until Day 16. Demet, one of the four White Room Wildcards, was voted into the House by the housemates on Day 11, while Nick entered on Day 18 as the winner of the Starburst Golden Key promotion.

A further four Intruders followed, Daniela and Laura on Day 31 and Michelle and Zach on Day 50. In a promotion for the upcoming season of Australian Idol, Idol judge and former Celebrity Big Brother housemate, Kyle Sandilands entered the House as a celebrity guest with a mission from Big Brother to encourage housemates to "be themselves", but left the House early due to a severe migraine. Due to an incident prior to the Big Brother 2007 finale, Intruder Laura was not invited to attend and participate while all other former Big Brother housemates - including White Room wildcards and intruders were present.

Name	Age on entry	Day entered	Day exited	Result
Aleisha Cowcher	20	0	100	Winner
Zach Douglas	24	50	100	Runner-up
Travis Perkins	32	0	99	Evicted
Chris "Billy" Bentley	23	2 (Note: While Billy entered on Day 2, he only formally became a Housemate on Day 16.)	99	Evicted
Zak "Zoran" Vidinovski	23	2	92	Evicted
Joel Scalzi	24	0	92	Evicted
Daniela Da Silva Pola	24	31	85	Evicted
Michelle Olsen	33	50	78	Evicted
Jamie McDonald	29	0	71	Evicted
Thomas Haynes	27	0	64	Evicted
Andrew Temment	28	0	64	Evicted
Laura Clare	20	31	57	Evicted
Rebecca Dent	23	0	50	Evicted
Emma Cornell	24	0	50	Evicted
Susannah Murray	30	2	43	Evicted
Nick Sady	25	18	36	Evicted
Hayley Zalewski	24	0	31	Evicted
Demet Sahan	25	11	29	Evicted
Bodie Czeladka	24	0	22	Evicted
Theresa-Jane "TJ" Whitlock	22	0	22	Evicted
Kate Gladman	25	0	15	Evicted

== Weekly summary and highlights ==
The main events in the Big Brother 7 house are summarised in the table below. Evictions, tasks, and other events for a particular week are noted. Events in the house are listed in order of sequence.

Weekly summary
Week 1	Entrances	On Day 0, Aleisha, Andrew, Bodie, Emma, Hayley, Jamie, Joel, Kate, Rebecca, Thomas, TJ and Travis entered the Big Brother House.; On Day 2, Susannah and Zoran entered the house, having both received the highest number of votes to enter via public voting (while the final count was not revealed, a vote count around 10 minutes before lines closed had Susannah 65% among the wildcard women, and Zoran on 45% of the vote between the wildcard men). Billy, also known as Mr. X, entered the house as a guest on Day 2.
Week 1	Tasks	On Day 2, housemates began their first weekly task. In the first part of the task, one by one, each housemate was called to the Diary Room in order to take a compatibility test. The test involved Big Brother giving a housemate two options, such as 'Saint' or 'Sinner', with the housemate asked to choose the option that best reflects their personality. In the second part of the task, Big Brother revealed that two of the housemates were in a secret relationship to each housemate and that they each had one week to decipher who these two housemates were. Housemates thought they were the only one to be given the task.; Billy's Tasks: On Day 2, Hayley's ex-boyfriend Billy was told that before he went to bed, he had to say "Goodnight Hayley, sweet dreams". On Day 3, Billy received his next task; he had to wait on Hayley from the moment she woke up until the moment she went to bed. The following day, when Billy was asked to take a housemate with him to tend the animals, he had to choose Hayley. On the fifth day, Billy had to become Andrew's best friend.; Friday Night Live: On Day 6, housemates competed in the first Friday Night Live of the season. The theme was 'Gladiators' this week. Emma was the winner. As a result of her win, she was allowed to choose one other housemate to take into the Rewards Room later that night and had to choose between three boxes which each contained a mystery prize; She decided to take Aleisha with her into the Rewards Room and won a New Zealand holiday.
Week 1	Twists	On Day 0, Big Brother revealed to the housemates that there was zero prize money.; To the viewers, Gretel Killeen confirmed that two more housemates would enter the house the following night according to who received the highest number of votes to enter from the public. It was also explained that two housemates entering the house on Day 0 had been tasked with hiding their true relationship. Hayley and Andrew were revealed as being in the secret relationship on Day 2 to the viewers; If they failed to hide their true relationship, one of them would be evicted. Hayley's ex-boyfriend, Billy, entered the house later that day to complicate their secret task (see Billy's Tasks).; On Day 2, Cruz, Demet, Harrison and Kara entered The White Room in a last chance attempt to become a housemate this season. Big Brother told them that the person who stayed in the room the longest would become a housemate.
Week 1	Punishments	On Day 7, Kate received her first official strike for showing aggression towards fellow housemate Emma.
Week 2	Tasks	On Day 8, Hayley and Andrew's relationship was revealed to the rest of the house. Because most of the housemates failed to guess that these two were the ones in a secret relationship, the house passed the first weekly task and added $50,000 to the total prize fund as a reward. Billy's identity as Hayley's ex-boyfriend was also revealed. As a further reward for successfully completing their secret tasks, Hayley and Andrew earned immunity from the first round of nominations.; The female housemates were then paired with a male housemate and given a realistic plastic baby and were required to feed it, change it and comfort it when it cried. When Thomas and Kate were called to the Diary Room, Kate told Big Brother that she would “rather leave the house than do the task.” She explained that she had lost a child during childbirth and could not bring herself to take part. Big Brother immediately cancelled the task and instructed the other housemates to return their babies to the Diary Room. Kate later explained the situation to the house, and the other housemates supported her. Big Brother then announced that a new task would take place later in the week.; On Day 11, the paired housemates were required to sit around a well and catch fish that were shot into the air. Once a fish was caught, the housemate had to kiss it and send it back into the well.
Week 2	Twists	On Day 8, Cruz, Demet, Harrison, and Kara (from The White Room) were offered money in exchange for their departure. Big Brother announced that the first housemate to press the red button would walk away with the money on offer. Cruz eventually pressed the button, leaving The White Room and his chance to become a housemate this season behind, taking $750 with him.; On Day 11, Demet was the last person remaining in the White Room, and entered the house as a fully fledged housemate.; Kate, Bodie, and Emma were originally up for nomination.; Emma, who had won the Friday Night Live games, used her new power, which allowed a housemate to directly swap someone in or out of the nomination lineup. She removed herself and replaced herself with Jamie.; The final nominated housemates were Kate, Bodie, and Jamie.
Week 2	Punishments	On Day 8, as a result of constant rule breaches—such as exceeding the four-minute shower limit—housemates were forced to earn their weekly food budget. For every rule broken during the week, they would be fined one dollar. As a further punishment, the housemates were supplied with porridge as their only source of food until further notice.; On Days 9 and 10, Bodie got into trouble for telling Aleshia who he had nominated. Big Brother informed the housemates that Bodie was no longer considered a housemate and was to be ignored until further notice. After a little over 24 hours, Big Brother called him into the Diary Room and told him he was officially a housemate again, and the rest of the house celebrated his return.; Thomas was given a nominations point for not nominating properly.
Week 2	Exits	On Day 8, Cruz left The White Room (see Twists).; The White Room twist ended on Day 10, when Big Brother instructed the three remaining housemates to evict one another. Harrison and Demet both chose Kara, and she was immediately evicted.; Harrison and Demet then competed in a special Friday Night Live–style game above the main house area while the housemates watched below. After the challenge, the housemates voted for which of the two should enter the house. Demet won the vote and became an official housemate.; Kate was evicted on Day 15 with 55% of the public vote to evict.
Week 3	Tasks	The housemates had to perform a pantomime for their weekly task. Housemates had to perform for a combined three minutes, however they went over four minutes. However, due to their performance, which Big Brother liked, they added $25,000 to the prize pool.
Week 3	Twists	As Billy has been successful in his tasks, he was granted full housemate status on Day 16.; Nick entered the house on Day 18 as winner of the Starburst Golden Key.; Hayley, who had won the Friday Night Live games, used her new power, which allowed a housemate to directly swap someone in or out of the nomination lineup. She removed Emma and replaced Emma with Joel.; Thomas was given a nominations point for not nominating properly.
Week 3	Punishments	
Week 3	Exits	TJ & Bodie were evicted on Day 22 with 54% and 7% of the public vote to evict respectively.
Week 4	Tasks	The housemates had to sleep for less than 21 hours from Monday to Friday. Also, whenever an alarm rang, in pairs, housemates had twenty seconds to press the snooze button. As a result of sleeping less than 21 hours, but failing seven times to press the snooze button, they added $15,000 to the prize pool.
Week 4	Twists	Andrew, who had won the Friday Night Live games, used his new power, which allowed a housemate to directly swap someone in or out of the nomination lineup. He removed Thomas and replaced Thomas with Demet.
Week 4	Punishments	
Week 4	Exits	Demet was evicted on Day 29 with 65% of the public vote to evict.
Week 5	Tasks	Housemates celebrated New Year's Eve and were each given a New Year's Resolution. They had to maintain their resolution for the duration of the whole week. During each New Year's Countdown, housemates had 10 seconds to reach the mat in the backyard and celebrate the new year, and sing 'Auld Lang Syne'. They added $10,000 to the prize pool.
Week 5	Twists	Demet, who had won the Friday Night Live games, used her new power, which allowed a housemate to directly swap someone in or out of the nomination lineup, even though she was evicted the previous night. She removed Emma and replaced Emma with Andrew.; Big Brother decided that Hayley and Andrew had to decide which one of them would leave the house. This was a condition of them entering the house that Big Brother held the power to remove one of them at anytime.; On Day 31, intruders Laura & Daniela entered the house as intruders.
Week 5	Punishments	The Punishment Room was used for the first time on Day 30, with Aleisha & Emma being sent there for discussing and alluding to nominations.; Aleisha & Emma were both given a nomination point for discussing and alluding to nominations.
Week 5	Exits	Hayley was evicted on Day 31, as her and Andrew had to decide which one of them would leave the house as per the agreement with Big Brother upon entering the house.; Nick was evicted on Day 36 with 51% of the public vote to evict.
Week 6	Tasks	Housemates had to eat, sleep and breathe India, which culminated in the housemates performing a Bollywood musical. They were given dance instructions, and had to rehearse for 1 hour each day. The director and the 6 starring actors were to be treated like stars, whilst the extras had to serve the needs and wait on the starring actors. The actors had to make each request with "I want", whilst the extras had to wear neck scarves, and give their mattresses to the diary room. The main actors also had exclusive access to the pool, spa, and gym. Housemates added $0 to the prize pool due to 33 breaches of rules.
Week 6	Twists	Andrew, who had won the Friday Night Live games, used his new power, which allowed a housemate to directly swap someone in or out of the nomination lineup. He removed Zoran and replaced Zoran with Susannah.
Week 6	Punishments	Big Brother gave Travis & Andrew a fine for talking in nominations in code.
Week 6	Exits	Susannah was evicted on Day 43 with 47% of the public vote to evict.
Week 7	Tasks	Housemates had to become self-sufficient. They had to eat, sleep and bathe outdoors, and must survive with only 15 buckets of rain-water for the whole week. They were not allowed to enter the house at all. Housemates were tasked with capturing water from a tank, and successfully transferring it to another tank. Big Brother also asked for 4 housemates to be volunteer to become 'ice-mates', these housemates entered the 'ice-cave' where they had to keep the experience a secret as they were granted luxuries that the other housemates had to do, whilst also slowly chipping away at ice-blocks. More housemates were recruited to the 'ice-cave later in the week'. Housemates earned $50,000 to the prize pool.
Week 7	Twists	This week, Housemates were asked to nominate the two Housemates they saw as the biggest threat to them winning Big Brother. This week was also a double eviction, and the five or more Housemates with the most points faced the public vote.; Billy, who had won the Friday Night Live games, used his new power, which allowed a housemate to directly swap someone in or out of the nomination lineup. He removed Aleisha and replaced Aleisha with Rebecca.; On Day 50, Michelle & Zach entered the house as intruders.
Week 7	Punishments	On Day 49, Laura received a $7 fine for taking selfies/photos with a digital camera that was from the 'ice-cave'.
Week 7	Exits	Emma & Rebecca were evicted on Day 50 with 76% and 4% of the public vote to evict respectively.
Week 8	Tasks	Big Brother stepped away from the house for 4 days, and the housemates had to run the Big Brother house by themselves. They had to govern themselves, and elect a leader; Thomas, and an enforcer; Billy. They decided the type of house they wanted to live in by coming up with 6 rules; becoming the Big Brother Constitution. Big Brother decided to let the housemates decide the judgement of the task, where they had to vote individually out of 10 how successful they were. The average score was 7, which meant that $65,000 was added to the prize pool due to a deduction from broken house rules.
Week 8	Twists	Andrew, who had won the Friday Night Live games, used his new power, which allowed a housemate to directly swap someone in or out of the nomination lineup. He removed himself, and replaced himself with Joel.
Week 8	Punishments	On Day 51, Thomas & Jamie were given a nomination point for their poor reasons of nominating.
Week 8	Exits	Laura was evicted on Day 57 with 43% of the public vote to evict.
Week 9	Tasks	
Week 9	Twists	As there was an unbalanced ratio of males to females in the House (8 males and 3 females), the females were all awarded immunity.
Week 9	Punishments	On Day 58 Andrew picked up the phone as a joke, and was penalised by being sent to the Punishment Room to polish boots.
Week 9	Exits	Andrew & Thomas were evicted on Day 64 with 24% and 22% of the public vote to evict respectively.
Week 10	Tasks	
Week 10	Twists	
Week 10	Punishments	Aleisha automatically faced the public vote this week after failing her secret mission as part of the Police Academy task.
Week 10	Exits	Jamie was evicted on Day 71 with 25% of the public vote to evict.
Week 11	Tasks	
Week 11	Twists	Joel was awarded immunity from nomination this week after passing a task the previous week.; Big Brother gave Australia 24 hours to vote for whom they want to nominate. The top vote recipient had two points cast against them in nominations, and the second top vote recipient received one point. The public chose Michelle (77%) and Daniela (15%).
Week 11	Punishments	
Week 11	Exits	Michelle was evicted on Day 78 with 73% of the public vote to evict.
Week 12	Tasks	
Week 12	Twists	This week, the nomination process was reversed, with the public nominating and the Housemates evicting. However, the Housemates still nominated, unaware that their nominations did not count. The public chose to nominate Daniela (26%), Billy (16%), Zach (14%) and Travis (13%) - these nominees were announced to the house as if they were voted on by the Housemates. Joel then used his FNL power to save Travis and Nominate Aleisha. On Day 85, the housemates were surprised with a House Eviction Vote.
Week 12	Punishments	
Week 12	Exits	Daniela was evicted on Day 85 with 12 of the 21 available points from the housemates left in the house. Daniela received two points from every other Housemate.
Week 13	Tasks	
Week 13	Twists	
Week 13	Punishments	
Week 13	Exits	Joel & Zoran were evicted on Day 93 with 7% and 1% of the public vote to evict respectively.
Week 14	Tasks	
Week 14	Twists	
Week 14	Punishments	
Week 14	Exits	On Day 99, Billy & Travis were evicted in a double eviction, with 14% and 18% of the public vote to evict, respectively, leaving Aleisha and Zach as the final two.; On Day 100, Aleisha was announced the winner, with 51% of the vote, leaving Zach the runner-up, with 49% of the vote.

== Friday Night Live ==
	Week 1	Week 2	Week 3	Week 4	Week 5	Week 6	Week 7	Week 8	Week 9	Week 10	Week 11	Week 12	Week 13	Week 14
Theme	Gladiator	Japanese Game Show	Bling Bling	On the Beach	Almost Famous	Outback Adventure	Jungle	Mexican	Nightmare	Back to School	Pirate	70's Disco	Seven Deadly Sins	Quest for Glory
Winner	Emma	Hayley	Andrew	Demet	Andrew	Billy	Andrew	Jamie	Daniela	Daniela	Joel	Billy	Travis	Zach
Winner's Choice	Aleisha	Andrew	Travis	Joel	Thomas	Zoran	Jamie	Thomas	Michelle	Zach	Zoran	Travis	Zach; Billy	—N/a
Major Prize	**New Zealand Holiday**	Domestic Holiday	**Watches**	Holiday	**Egypt Holiday**	Vietnam Holiday	Borneo Holiday	South America Holiday	Cambodia Holiday	Vietnam Holiday	Thailand Holiday	South Africa Holiday	South America Holiday	—N/a
Minor Prize	Scooter	Scooter	Scooter	**Scooter**	Scooter	Scooter	**Nintendo Wii**	Nintendo Wii	**Scooter**	Nintendo Wii	**Scooter**	Nintendo Wii	Nintendo Wii	—N/a
Booby Prize	Baby Shoes	**Porridge**	Zebra Underpants	Bucket & Spade	Hiking Boots	**Kangaroo Poo**	Half-Eaten Banana	**Chili Con Carne**	Skeleton Foot	**Whoopee Cushion**	Pirate Videotape	**Leo Sayer Greatest Hits CD**	**Seven Deadly Pins**	—N/a

Italic and bold denotes prize won.

- In the 13th Friday Night Games, as the winner, Travis was allowed to bring two guests into the Rewards Room.
- Andrew has won more Friday Night Games than any other housemate, in any season that "FNL" has aired in on Big Brother.
- As an extra on the final Friday Night Games, Zach (the winner) won the chance to spend a few minutes with his best friend Zac, Zack, or Zachary who Big Brother used in the last mini-task, instead of the usual prizes.

== Nominations table ==
Color key:

Winner
Runner-up
Friday Night Live (FNL) winner
Nominated
Exempt
No Nomination
Evicted

	Week 2	Week 3	Week 4	Week 5	Week 6	Week 7	Week 8	Week 9	Week 10	Week 11	Week 12		Week 13	Week 14		Nomination points received
	Week 2	Week 3	Week 4	Week 5	Week 6	Week 7	Week 8	Week 9	Week 10	Week 11	Fake Noms	Real Eviction	Week 13	Day 99	Day 100 (Finale)	Nomination points received
FNL Winner	Emma	Hayley	Andrew	Demet	Andrew	Billy	Andrew	Jamie	Daniela	Daniela	Joel		Billy	Travis	Zach	
Aleisha	2–Kate; 1–Jamie	2–Jamie; 1–TJ	2–Zoran; 1–Thomas	2–Nick; 1–Rebecca	2–Jamie; 1–Rebecca	2–Travis; 1–Joel	2–Daniela; 1–Jamie	2–Thomas; 1–Travis	2–Michelle; 1–Jamie	2–Michelle; 1–Zach	2–Daniela; 1–Zoran	2–Daniela; 1–Zach	2–Zoran; 1–Joel	No; Nominations	Winner (Day 100)	16
Zach	Not in House						Exempt	Exempt	2–Zoran; 1–Jamie	2–Zoran; 1–Michelle	2–Joel; 1–Zoran	2–Daniela; 1–Billy	2–Travis; 1–Joel	No; Nominations	Runner-Up (Day 100)	13
Travis	2–Zoran; 1–Emma	2–Zoran; 1–Emma	2–Emma; 1–Thomas	2–Nick; 1–Thomas	2–Jamie; 1–Rebecca	2–Thomas; 1–Zoran	2–Laura; 1–Daniela	2–Jamie; 1–Thomas	2–Daniela; 1–Joel	2–Zach; 1–Daniela	2–Daniela; 1–Zach	2–Daniela; 1–Zach	2–Zoran; 1–Zach	No; Nominations	Evicted (Day 99)	23
Billy	Exempt	2–TJ; 1–Zoran	2–Zoran; 1–Thomas	2–Susannah; 1–Rebecca	2–Jamie; 1–Rebecca	2–Travis; 1–Andrew	2–Laura; 1–Daniela	2–Zoran; 1–Travis	2–Michelle; 1–Daniela	2–Daniela; 1–Zoran	2–Daniela; 1–Zach	2–Daniela; 1–Zach	2–Zoran; 1–Joel	No; Nominations	Evicted (Day 99)	14
Zoran	2–Bodie; 1–Aleisha	2–Bodie; 1–Emma	2–Rebecca; 1–Jamie	2–Rebecca; 1–Nick	2–Jamie; 1–Rebecca	2–Travis; 1–Andrew	2–Laura; 1–Daniela	2–Andrew; 1–Billy	2–Billy; 1–Michelle	2–Michelle; 1–Daniela	2–Zach; 1–Daniela	2–Daniela; 1–Billy	2–Billy; 1–Travis	Evicted (Day 92)		47
Joel	2–Kate; 1–TJ	2–TJ; 1–Susannah	2–Susannah; 1–Travis	2–Jamie; 1–Nick	2–Jamie; 1–Rebecca	2–Travis; 1–Aleisha	2–Laura; 1–Andrew	2–Jamie; 1–Billy	2–Jamie; 1–Zach	2–Zach; 1–Travis	2–Daniela; 1–Zach	2–Daniela; 1–Zach	2–Aleisha; 1–Billy	Evicted (Day 92)		18
Daniela	Not in House				Exempt	2–Travis; 1–Andrew	2–Andrew; 1–Laura	2–Andrew; 1–Joel	2–Billy; 1–Zoran	2–Billy; 1–Aleisha	2–Zoran; 1–Billy	2–Billy; 1–Aleisha	Evicted (Day 85)			30
Michelle	Not in House						Exempt	Exempt	2–Zoran; 1–Zach	2–Aleisha; 1–Zoran	Evicted (Day 78)					12
Jamie	2–Emma; 1–TJ	2–Emma; 1–Bodie	2–Emma; 1–Aleisha	2–Emma; 1–Nick	2–Emma; 1–Zoran	2–Emma; 1–Aleisha	2–Joel; 1–Aleisha	2–Billy; 1–Joel	2–Joel; 1–Zoran	Evicted (Day 71)						35
Thomas	2–Kate; 1–Aleisha	2–Zoran; 1–Aleisha	2–Demet; 1–Hayley	2–Aleisha; 1–Emma	2–Zoran; 1–Travis	2–Travis; 1–Andrew	2–Laura; 1–Travis	2–Andrew; 1–Travis	Evicted (Day 64)							13
Andrew	Exempt	2–Bodie; TJ	2–Demet; 1–Emma	2–Nick; 1–Susannah	2–Zoran; 1–Rebecca	2–Daniela; 1–Jamie	2–Daniela; 1–Laura	2–Jamie; 1–Thomas	Evicted (Day 64)							14
Laura	Not in House				Exempt	2–Daniela; 1–Emma	2–Zoran; 1–Andrew	Evicted (Day 57)								12
Rebecca	2–Bodie; 1–TJ	2–Emma; 1–Bodie	2–Emma; 1–Zoran	2–Emma; 1–Joel	2–Joel; 1–Emma	2–Emma; 1–Travis	Evicted (Day 50)									21
Emma	2–Kate; 1–Jamie	2–Rebecca; 1–Jamie	2–Thomas; 1–Rebecca	2–Rebecca; 1–Susannah	2–Rebecca; 1–Jamie	2–Daniela; 1–Jamie	Evicted (Day 50)									37
Susannah	2–Jamie; 1–Bodie	2–Bodie; 1–Aleisha	2–Emma; 1–Aleisha	2–Emma; 1–Jamie	2–Emma; 1–Zoran	Evicted (Day 43)										11
Nick	Not in House		Exempt	2–Joel; 1–Emma	Evicted (Day 36)											9
Hayley	Exempt	2–Bodie; 1–TJ	2–Demet; 1–Emma	No; Nominations	Evicted (Day 31)											2
Demet	In White; Room	Exempt	2–Susannah; 1–Thomas	Evicted; FNL Winner	Evicted (Day 29)											4
Bodie	2–Kate; 1–Rebecca	2–Zoran; 1–Rebecca	Evicted (Day 22)													14
TJ	2–Zoran; 1–Kate	2–Susannah; 1–Hayley	Evicted (Day 22)													9
Kate	2–Emma; 1–Bodie	Evicted (Day 15)														11
Notes	1	2	3	4	5	6	7	8	9	10	11		none	12	13	
Nominated (pre-Twist of Fate)	Bodie, Emma, Kate	Bodie, Emma, TJ, Zoran	Emma, Thomas, Zoran	Emma, Nick, Rebecca	Jamie, Rebecca, Zoran	Aleisha, Andrew, Daniela, Emma, Jamie, Thomas, Travis	Andrew, Daniela, Laura	Andrew, Billy, Jamie, Thomas	Aleisha, Billy, Jamie, Michelle, Zoran	Daniela, Michelle, Zach	Billy, Daniela, Travis, Zach		Billy, Joel, Travis, Zoran	none		
Saved	Emma	Emma	Thomas	Emma	Zoran	Aleisha	Andrew	Jamie	Michelle	Daniela	Travis		Billy	none		
Against public vote	Bodie, Jamie, Kate	Bodie, Joel, TJ, Zoran	Demet, Emma, Zoran	Andrew, Nick, Rebecca	Jamie, Rebecca, Susannah	Andrew, Daniela, Emma, Jamie, Rebecca, Thomas, Travis	Daniela, Joel, Laura	Andrew, Billy, Joel, Thomas	Aleisha, Billy, Jamie, Joel, Zoran	Aleisha, Michelle, Zach	Aleisha, Billy, Daniela, Zach		Joel, Travis, Zach, Zoran	Aleisha, Billy, Travis, Zach	Aleisha, Zach	
Evicted	Kate; 55% to evict	TJ; 54% to evict	Demet; 65% to evict	Hayley; Chosen to evict	Susannah; 47% to evict	Emma; 76% to evict	Laura; 43% to evict	Andrew; 24% to evict	Jamie; 25% to evict	Michelle; 73% to evict	Daniela; 12 of 21 points to evict		Joel; 7% to evict	Billy; 14% to evict	Zach; 49% to save	
Evicted	Kate; 55% to evict	Bodie; 7% to evict	Demet; 65% to evict	Nick; 51% to evict	Susannah; 47% to evict	Rebecca; 4% to evict	Laura; 43% to evict	Thomas; 22% to evict	Jamie; 25% to evict	Michelle; 73% to evict	Daniela; 12 of 21 points to evict		Zoran; 1% to evict	Travis; 18% to save	Aleisha; 51% to save	

=== Notes ===
- ^Note 1: Andrew and Hayley won immunity in this week's nominations, after managing to keep their relationship a secret. However, they were to vote as a couple until further notice; they could, however, be nominated as individuals. At this time, Billy was only a guest in the House and could not nominate. Thomas was penalised with a nomination point after failing to properly nominate.
- ^Note 2: As a new Housemate, Demet was exempt from nominating this week. Billy became an official Housemate and was allowed to nominate for the first time. This week was a Double Eviction.
- ^Note 3: As a new Housemate, Nick was exempt from nomination this week.
- ^Note 4: Hayley was evicted when she and Andrew were forced to choose one of them to leave the House. Daniela and Laura entered shortly after her Eviction. Emma and Aleisha were both penalised a nomination point by Big Brother for discussing nominations. In the nominations twist, prior to leaving the House, Friday Night Games winner Demet – who was evicted the night before nominations – provided a choice of Housemates whom she wished to save and whom she wished to nominate. Once her selection were applied, Emma was saved from nomination, and Andrew was the replacement nominee.
- ^Note 5: As new Housemates, Daniela and Laura were exempt from nomination this week.
- ^Note 6: This week, Housemates were asked to nominate the two Housemates they saw as the biggest threat to them winning Big Brother. This week was also a double eviction, and the five or more Housemates with the most points faced the public vote.
- ^Note 7: New Housemates Michelle and Zach were exempt from nominations for the first two weeks of their stay. Thomas was penalised one nomination point for poor reasons of nominating.
- ^Note 8: As there was an unbalanced ratio of males to females in the House (8 males and 3 females), the females were all awarded immunity.
- ^Note 9: Aleisha automatically faced the public vote this week after failing her secret mission as part of the Police Academy task.
- ^Note 10: Joel was awarded immunity from nomination this week after passing a task the previous week. Big Brother gave Australia 24 hours to vote for whom they want to nominate. The top vote recipient had two points cast against them in nominations, and the second top vote recipient received one point. The public chose Michelle (77%) and Daniela (15%).
- ^Note 11: This week, the nomination process was reversed, with the public nominating and the Housemates evicting. However, the Housemates still nominated, unaware that their nominations did not count. The public chose to nominate Daniela (26%), Billy (16%), Zach (14%) and Travis (13%) - these nominees were announced to the house as if they were voted on by the Housemates. Joel then used his FNL power to save Travis and Nominate Aleisha. On Day 85, the housemates were surprised with a House Eviction Vote. Daniela was evicted with 12 out of 21 points, receiving two points from every other Housemate.
- ^Note 12: The final four Housemates were all nominated for a Double Eviction.
- ^Note 13: The final two Housemates, Aleisha and Zach, both automatically faced the public vote to determine the winner; whoever received the most save votes (or the least evict votes) would be the winner.

== Special episodes ==
A number of special episodes aired during the original run of the season. These included:

=== Game On ===
"Game On" was a live show that was broadcast on Day 2 (23 April 2007). The results of the overnight wild-card SMS vote were revealed. Susannah and Zoran were the chosen two out of the six wild-card housemates. The remainder of the wild-card housemates were isolated in the White Room. The Daily Show was incorporated into the first part of the live show. Hosted by Gretel Killeen.

=== Full House ===
"Full House" was a live show that was broadcast on Day 8 (29 April 2007). It was aired in the timeslot usually occupied by Eviction shows. Firstly, the secure relationship between Andrew and Hayley was revealed to the house, as was Billy's role to impede Hayley's task of keeping that relationship secret from the other housemates. Hayley and Andrew were deemed by Big Brother to have successfully kept their relationship a secret from the housemates for the week (fewer than half of the housemates had successfully guessed their relationship) which meant they could both stay in the house. Big Brother also revealed that for succeeding in their task they had earned $50,000 to be added to the prize money, which was previously set at zero.

Big Brother also tempted the wildcard housemates to leave the White Room by offering a sum of money to them (A$750), which Cruz accepted. Hosted by Gretel Killeen.

=== Wild Card Entry ===
"Wild Card Entry" was a live show broadcast on Day 11 (2 May 2007). The White Room housemates had left the room and, dependent on the following events, one of them would enter the Big Brother house as a housemate.

- The first evictee was determined by the White Room housemates had to vote off one of their own; Kara was eliminated with two votes.
- In the second round, the Final 2 competed in a Heights Challenge (similar to that used as the final game in the first FNL) - having had to collect three major items of clothing and dress a model while airborne on a large steel frame. This was witnessed by the Big Brother Housemates, who cast their votes for either Harrison or Demet to enter the house. Demet won with 8 votes against 6.

Hosted by Gretel Killeen.

=== Golden Key ===
"Golden Key" was a live show broadcast on Day 18 (9 May 2007). This special was to select the winner of the Starburst Golden Key. The show's producers had selected five finalists from the original 100 Golden Key winners after an intensive audition process. The chosen finalists were Carolyn, Nick, Natalie, Angie and Laura. To select which would become a housemate contestants chose one of five numbered discs randomly from a bag. Then they were allocated a clear box of confectionery depending on which disc they had selected. One box also contained a golden key, and the contestant whose box contained the key, Nick, was designated the new housemate. He entered the house during the show, while the housemates were performing a Pantomime as part of a weekly task. Hosted by Gretel Killeen.

=== Intruder Alert! / Intruder Eviction ===
"Intruder Alert!" was a live 90-minute special that aired on Day 31 (22 May 2007). Hayley was evicted from the house during the episode. Later new housemates Daniela and Laura entered as intruders. Hosted by Gretel Killeen.

=== The Works ===
"The Works" was a scheduled Big Brother special focusing on behind the scenes footage that was planned to air on Day 46 (6 June 2007). The show would have been recorded on the same day at Network Ten's Pyrmont studios. The show was later cancelled for unapparent reasons.

=== Live Eviction 6 / Intruders Incoming ===
The 6th Live Eviction show was a 90-minute eviction and intruder special that aired on Day 50 (10 June 2007). It featured a double eviction and introduced the two new intruders, Michelle and Zach. Michelle entered and met the remaining housemates. Zach remained in the Rewards Room, awaiting entry during UpLate later that evening. Hosted by Gretel Killeen and Mike Goldman.

=== Kyle in the House ===
"Kyle in the House" was a special version of the daily show that aired for 60 minutes before Live Eviction 11 on Day 85 (15 July 2007). It featured a recap on Kyle Sandilands' entry to the house and during the show Big Brother set Sandilands a special task to "challenge the housemates".

=== Gretel Goes In ===
The final nomination show on Day 93 (23 July 2007) was a special where the housemates did not need to nominate and instead Killeen went into the Rewards Room to interview the housemates individually and ask questions supplied by the viewers. Hosted by Gretel Killeen.

=== Final Sunday Double Eviction ===
Final Sunday Double Eviction was the last Eviction of Big Brother 2007, and was broadcast live in front of an audience on Day 99 (29 July 2007) from Dreamworld, and was hosted by Gretel Killeen.

=== Finale ===
The season finale aired on Day 100 (30 July 2007) in which all the previous houseguests returned to reflect on the season, and included a special Pantomime in which the past houseguests recreated some of the season's best moments. In addition, the final two housemates were reunited with loved ones, before leaving the house together.

For the finale, the stage was modified with two large screens covering the sides of the eviction stage.

It was the closest final in Australian Big Brother history of less than 500 votes and the announcement of the winner was delayed by an hour after the voting lines closed as votes were rechecked. At one point during the final episode, there was just 64 votes difference between the last two housemates. At the end of the show, Aleisha was announced the winner and Zach the runner-up. Aleisha is the second female to win Big Brother Australia.

== Reception ==
The 2007 launch had the smallest ever opening episode audience in all seven Australian Big Brother series, and a 14% drop from the previous year's opening night. Network Ten came second overall but lost the night to Nine Network's 60 Minutes. Nevertheless, with an average of 1.549 million viewers, the opening night was Ten's best Sunday night of the year, to date. The series finale was expected to have just under two million viewers, a 10% drop from 2006's finale. Network Ten later announced that the peak audience for the finale was 2.3 million viewers. Crikey's media reporter Glenn Dyer stated that Ten's reported figures were exaggerated, and that the average number of viewers was 1.791 million for the entire show, not 1.9 as Ten had stated, which only accounted for 8.30pm – 10pm. He also said that while the peak of 2.3 million viewers beat the 2006 finale, the average audience was fewer than the 2006 finale's average 1.88 million viewers. In June, the series ratings were down 5% overall and 13% in the 16- to 39-year-old demographic compared to the previous year's series.

By the series' final week in July these figures had dropped a further 5% and 2% respectively. The Daily Show and Live Eviction Show were down 100,000 and 200,000 viewers respectively. Overall the season attracted around one million viewers each night. The show received several bad reviews. The Sunday Telegraph stated that "nothing could get worse for the ratings-challenged BB". The Daily Telegraph named the series "Most. Boring. Ever." The Sunday Herald Sun said that the show "has committed the worst television sin – it is boring." eBroadcast Australia considered the program "left lifeless and fading" after the finale. Christian Today thought the entire season "a slump in rating". One review in The Age praised the series, pointing out the highlights of the season and claiming "[Big Brother] is as enjoyable as watching a quality sitcom or drama". Another Age journalist disagreed, commenting that the 2007 series "just didn't sparkle". In comments reported in a newspaper article, evicted housemate Emma reflected on the program's reduced ratings and noted that whilst inside the house the housemates joked about whether the show had been cancelled.

=== Ratings ===
	Viewers (millions) 5-City Metro													
	Week 1	Week 2	Week 3	Week 4	Week 5	Week 6	Week 7	Week 8	Week 9	Week 10	Week 11	Week 12	Week 13	Week 14
Sunday	1.55	1.10	1.02	1.06	1.00	0.98	1.01	1.03	1.09	1.01	1.01	1.13	1.07	**1.09**
Sunday		1.24	1.16	1.19	1.12	1.08	1.10	1.13	1.16	1.09	1.07	1.19	1.11	**1.17**
Monday	1.04	1.01	0.98	1.02	0.95	0.90	0.98	1.01	1.01	0.99	1.00	1.06	1.08	**1.79**
Monday	1.12	1.10	1.07	1.13	1.05	0.99	1.06	1.07	1.09	1.04	1.06	1.10	1.13	
Tuesday	0.96	0.98	0.93	0.97	1.10	0.89	1.13	0.96	0.91	0.87	0.89	0.94	0.97	
Wednesday	1.00	1.08	1.10	1.00	0.97	0.94	1.04	1.03	1.07	1.01	1.00	1.06	1.09	
Thursday	1.04	1.01	1.00	0.98	0.94	0.91	0.99	1.00	1.04	0.97	0.99	1.04	1.01	
Friday	1.01	1.06	1.02	1.06	1.03	0.98	1.04	1.07	1.06	1.01	1.03	1.07	1.09	
Friday	1.09	1.12	1.07	1.11	1.08	1.03	1.09	1.10	1.11	1.07	1.07	1.17	1.23	
Weekly average	1.10	1.08	1.04	1.06	1.03	0.97	1.05	1.04	1.06	1.01	1.01	1.08	1.09	**1.35**
Running average	1.10	1.09	1.07	1.07	1.06	1.05	1.05	1.05	1.05	1.04	1.04	1.04	1.05	**1.07**
Series average	1.07m													

Ratings are rounded to the nearest ten thousand. Uplate shows are not included in official averages. Figures in bold include consolidated viewing figures.

== Controversies ==
- The Daily Telegraph had reported on 21 April 2007 – the day before the show's launch – that an internet hacker claimed to have obtained the names of the 18 housemates from the official Three Mobile website: "Aleisha, Andrew, Brodie, Cruz, Demet, Emma, Harrison, Hayley, Jamie, Joel, Kara, Kate, Rebecca, Sussannah, Thomas, TJ, Travis, and Zoran". A Three Mobile spokeswoman denied the claims and told the media that the names were not "hacked" or "leaked" from the Three Mobile site, refusing to confirm whether the housemates names' and photos were real.
- Because of the pre-recorded nature of launch shows, members of different forums and websites decided to have live streams using mobile phones allowing people to listen to the show before it was broadcast on national television. Because of this, recording of the show stopped until the streaming was stopped. Eventually, production staff offered prizes if audience members would pick out people from the crowd using phones to broadcast the show.
- The Daily Telegraph had reported that Big Brother producers had failed to censor offensive language when housemate Bodie told other housemates he was a "dense cunt" during the PG-rated Daily Show on Tuesday 24 April 2007.
- The Sunday Mail on 29 April 2007 had reported that the parents of Mormon housemate Rebecca, were upset that their daughter was under siege from fellow housemates over her decision not to join in their party antics.
- The Daily Telegraph had reported on 4 May 2007 that housemate Kate's situation regarding her pregnancy and pre-eclampsia was known by Network Ten and producer Endemol Southern Star before her entry to the house. This subsequently led to her breakdown regarding the "Newborn Group Task".
- The Courier-Mail, The Daily Telegraph and The Age had reported that backpackers, students and other young people were being paid as little as $50 a day cash-in-hand for stunt work for the Friday Night Live Games episodes of Big Brother. It is claimed that they were used to test the various stunts that the housemates would have to perform. The Office of Workplace Services and other government departments were investigating the claims to see if the producers Endemol Southern Star were in breach of any laws or regulations.
- Week 8 of Friday Night Live had a "Mexican" theme where housemates had to throw liquid-filled balloons at a Mexican Flag, with the intention of drenching the fabric. This use of the Mexican flag provoked criticism from Mexican officials. In a letter to the Australian Communications and Media Authority and production company Endemol Southern Star, Mexico's Foreign Ministry complained about the offensive use of the country's flag. "(We) demand they take adequate measures to avoid this type of incident in the future", the ministry said. The show's producers later issued an apology.
- The Daily Telegraph reported on 3 July that host Gretel Killeen was aggressive towards some housemates, in particular Jamie during his eviction interview after he suggested the video package shown of him crying and sitting alone was biased towards the negative. Later she was criticised for being particularly passive aggressive towards other male housemates like Thomas and Nick. Killeen was also criticised for hypocrisy having aggressively questioned why Jamie did not intervene when Michelle argued with Aleisha, and yet she was receptive towards Michelle herself on her eviction, and even rationalised Michelle's behaviour during the argument. Michelle was also named the most unpopular housemate ever to inhabit the Australian Big Brother House.
- Former housemate Susannah had left her partner and started dating fellow housemate Thomas after leaving the BB house. It was reported that her ex, Anthony Murphy, had blamed the reality TV show for the demise of their relationship.
