= Infanta (disambiguation) =

In the Spanish and former Portuguese monarchies, Infanta is the title given to a daughter of the reigning monarch who is not the heir-apparent to the throne.

Infanta may also refer to:

- Infanta Maria Escalosa of Spain, a fictional infanta played by Miriam Margolyes in the BBC sitcom, Blackadder
- Infanta was the former name of the USS Amber (PYc-6), a United States Navy patrol vessel used in World War II
- "The Infanta" is the title of the first track on the album Picaresque by The Decemberists

As a place name, Infanta may refer to:

- Infanta, Pangasinan, a municipality in the Philippines
- Infanta, Quezon, a municipality in the Philippines
- Infanta, a coastal village at Cape Infanta, South Africa

== See also ==
- Infant (disambiguation)
- Infante (disambiguation)
