= Infante (disambiguation) =

Infante was a title and rank given in the Iberian kingdoms during the Middle Ages, and still given today in Spain.

Infante can also refer to:

- Alexis Infante (born 1961), Venezuelan baseball player (retired infielder)
- Edward Anthony Infante (born 1940), former chief magistrate judge, United States District Court for the Northern District of California
- José Miguel Infante (1778–1844), Chilean politician
- Lindy Infante (1940–2015), American professional football coach
- Lupita Infante, American singer-songwriter
- Manuel Infante (1883–1958), Spanish composer
- Omar Infante (born 1981), Venezuelan baseball player (current infielder)
- Pedro Infante (1917–1957), Mexican singer and actor
- Guillermo Cabrera Infante (1929–2005), Cuban writer
- Spanish ship Infante, a 50-gun ship of the line

== See also ==
- Infant (disambiguation)
- Infanta (disambiguation)
