= Swaffelen =

Dutch sexual term

Swaffelen (or zwaffelen, similar to "dick-slap") is to hit one's soft or semi-erect penis — often repeatedly — against an object or another person's body. Swaffelen is Dutch and was named as the word of the year in the Netherlands and Belgium in 2008.

The act of swaffelen often takes place in the form of teasing, crude humor, or a degrading context, but it can also be a sexual act. When the act is practiced on a person, it is often the person's cheek that is hit with the flaccid or semi-hard penis. Similar terms exist in other languages.

== Origin ==
The term "swaffelen" is believed to have originated in English-speaking areas. It is believed to originate from Dutch words meaning swing, sway and swoop, as well as the German words for tail or penis (Schweif and Schwanz).

== Australian English (turkey-slap) ==
Turkey-slap is another term for swaffelen. The phrase gained notoriety in Australia during 2006, after two male contestants, Ashley Cox and John Bric, in the Big Brother reality TV series performed the act on a female housemate, Camilla Severi. In the ensuing controversy, the male housemates were expelled from the house and contest for violating the show's terms of agreement.

== Dutch (swaffelen) ==
In April 2008, the term received wide media attention in the Netherlands and Belgium, when a Dutch student committed the act on the Taj Mahal and uploaded the video to YouTube. The student was suspended for this action.

In response, the BNN TV program Spuiten en Slikken invited viewers to make their own videos of other objects being swaffeled. They also called for a BNN Nationale Swaffeldag (BNN National Swaffel Day) to be declared. The Royal Palace of Amsterdam and the Basilica of Saint Servatius in Maastricht were among the objects swaffeled in the submissions.

In 2015 a firefighter in Enkhuizen was fired for swaffeling a colleague.

When the topic of swearing in various languages arose, in episode 4, series N, of the British panel show QI, one of the show's panelists, Jeremy Clarkson, mentioned the word, defining it as "...to bang your penis against the Taj Mahal."

=== Word of the year ===
Swaffelen was voted as the word of the year in a 2008 competition organized by Genootschap Onze Taal ("Society for Our Language"), Van Dale Uitgevers (Van Dale Publishers) and the newspaper De Pers. The blog GeenStijl encouraged readers to vote for swaffelen. Swaffelen received 57% of the votes while wiiën ("play Wii") drew 12% and bankendomino (referring to credit crisis) received 6% of the votes. Gastroseksueel and smirten each received 5% of the vote.

== Swedish (ollning) ==
In Swedish, a similar act is ollning, which roughly translates to "glans-ing" (att olla, "to glans"; from noun ollon, "glans", and verb-building suffix -a), which is the act of touching or rubbing the penis tip against something, typically exotic places or places which others will touch.

The act is said to be facetious but can be perceived as gross and sexual, and it can be prosecuted.

== See also ==
- Erotic humiliation
- Teabagging, term for the sexual act involving placing the scrotum into the mouth of a sexual partner
