= Spanish ship Infante =

Spanish ship Infante may refer to the following ships:

- Spanish ship Infante (1750), a 70-gun ship of the line
- Spanish brig Infante (1787), a 18-gun brig

== See also ==
- Infante (disambiguation)
