= Big Brother (Australian TV series) season 6 =

Big Brother
- Season 6
- Presented by: Gretel Killeen
- No. of days: 100
- No. of housemates: 23
- Winner: Jamie Brooksby
- Runner-up: Camilla Severi
- Companion shows: Big Brother Nominations; Big Brother: Adults Only; Big Brother: UpLate; Friday Night Live
- No. of episodes: 135 (+ 70 UpLate)

Release
- Original network: Network Ten
- Original release: 23 April – 31 July 2006

Season chronology
- ← Previous; Season 5 Next → Season 7

The sixth season of the Australian reality television series, Big Brother, also known as Big Brother 2006, began on 23 April 2006, with housemates going into the house the day before, and finished on 31 July 2006; a duration of 101 days. In the auditions, which had been held in November and December 2005, producers asked for contestants who were "smart, strong, and looking for a fight".

The Launch was aired on the evening of 23 April 2006 (a 24-hour delay). Fifteen housemates initially entered the house on Day 0, with the addition of three Intruder housemates entering the Big Brother House in Week 4, another three Intruders in Week 9, and two replacement housemates entering in Week 12. On Day 100, Jamie was declared the winner of Big Brother 2006, with Camilla the runner-up. At the time it was the closest winning margin in any Australian series of the show, later beaten by Series 7 in 2007.

As in the previous season, the voice of Big Brother was provided by Nick Colquhoun, who continued to portray the character with a stricter and more authoritarian tone. Throughout the 2006 series, Big Brother frequently issued fines and penalties to housemates for rule breaches and maintained a firm disciplinary approach. On several occasions, housemates who broke the rules were also given specific punishments by Big Brother. This season proved to be highly controversial after two male housemates sexually harassed a female housemate, resulting in the pair’s ejection from the show. The incident sparked calls for the series to be investigated for possible breaches of broadcasting laws, and calls for the cancellation of the series by several commentators and politicians, including then Australian Prime Minister John Howard and opposition leader Kim Beazley.

== Ratings ==
Ratings for Big Brother 2006 were up slightly on the previous year. The Daily Show increased its average audience to 1.13 million viewers, up from 1.11 million in 2005. The live Sunday evening Eviction shows averaged an audience of around 1.3 million for the 2006 series. The 2006 Finale attracted 1.9 million viewers with the viewing audience peaking at 2.2 million at 9:39 pm

== Changes and additions ==
The sixth season featured several innovations to the formula.

=== Voting format ===
In previous seasons, viewers could only vote to evict the nominated housemates they wanted to leave the house. This season added the save vote. Any viewer may cast as many evict or save votes as they choose. Prior to eviction each housemates' save votes were merged with their evict votes; the housemate with the highest number of evict votes—or lowest number of save votes—remaining after the merge is evicted.

=== The House ===
As with some previous seasons, a new house with an original layout was constructed for this series. A new feature was the addition of a Punishment Room to which rule-breaking housemates would be consigned by Big Brother. Housemates in the Punishment Room were required to perform tedious, difficult, embarrassing, or mildly painful tasks and jobs, such as sorting white rice from brown rice, sanding a wooden cube into a sphere, or dancing around a sombrero for hours.

=== Related housemates secret ===
One of the twists of this season, promoted in advertising hyperbole as "Australia's World First", was that housemates Karen and Krystal are mother and daughter. This was not revealed to the other housemates, who were challenged to uncover the secret relationship in the house. The other housemates failed to uncover their secret, and as a reward for success in keeping their secret Karen and Krystal were exempt from being nominated by other housemates in the first round. Karen was later evicted from the House on Day 22. In Big Brother 2005 a different related-housemates secret task was conducted. Twin brothers Greg and David Mathew were, one at a time, put in the House, and were told to swap places at given times without being noticed by other housemates. They were given the mission to keep this a secret for the opportunity to be entered into the game as individual housemates, each with the chance of winning Big Brother 2005.

=== The Insider ===
This season featured The Insider. Australia voted between the Housemates deemed "The Most Competitive" - David, Michael & Camilla. Michael was voted by Australia to be The Insider with 43% of the vote. Michael had to complete secret missions tasked by Big Brother in order to win immunity from Nomination Voting and hence, Eviction. Failure in a mission would result in Automatic Nomination.

After 3 weeks, Michael retired as The Insider. Australia voted between David, Clare and Jade during Week 4's eviction. Jade was selected with 45% of the vote.

=== Big Brother Uncut ===
2006 saw the renaming of Big Brother Uncut to Big Brother: Adults Only. Network Ten discontinued Adults Only early due to pressure from politicians, with the final episode broadcast on 19 June 2006. The content that was to be used on unscreened episodes was made available on a new Big Brother Premium (paying members) section of the Big Brother website called Adults Only.

== Housemates ==
Fifteen housemates entered at the beginning of the season. A total of eight additional housemates entering during the series. The first batch of intruders were Danielle Foote, Jade Stack and Rob Rigley. The second batch of intruders were Perry Apostolu, Darren Bowley and Lauren Clayton. After Ashley Cox and John Bric were removed after the controversial "turkey slapping incident" replacement housemates Max and Chris were added.

The winner was announced in July to be Jamie Brooksby, with Camilla Severi (alias "Camilla Halliwell") runner-up. It was the closest public voting in the Australian Big Brother series up to this point. While all former 2006 Big Brother housemates and intruders were all reunited for the 2006 Finale, Ashley and John were not invited to attend and participate.

Name	Age on entry	Day entered	Day exited	Result
Jamie Brooksby	22	0	100	Winner
Camilla Severi	22	0	100	Runner-up
David Graham	26	0	99	Evicted
James "Max" Panebianco	20	80	99	Evicted
Chris Everden	22	80	95	Evicted
Krystal Forscutt	19	0	92	Evicted
Claire Madden	22	0	92	Evicted
Darren Bowley	19	60	85	Evicted
Perry Apostolou	39	60	78	Evicted
Gaelan Walker	26	0	71	Evicted
Michael "Ashley" Cox	20	0	70	Ejected
Michael "John" Bric	20	0	70	Ejected
Rob Rigley	26	24	64	Evicted
Lauren Clayton	22	60	64	Evicted
Katie Hastings	19	0	57	Evicted
Danielle Foote	18	24	50	Evicted
Dino Delic	21	0	43	Evicted
Jade Stack	19	24	43	Evicted
Michael McCoy	25	0	36	Evicted
Anna Lind-Hansen	20	0	29	Evicted
Karen Forscutt	36	0	22	Evicted
Elise Chen	21	0	15	Evicted
Matilda "Tilli" Clapham	19	0	15	Evicted

== Weekly summary and highlights ==
=== Week 1 ===
(up to and including Sunday night)

- Michael McCoy was the first to enter the house, followed by Camilla Severi.
- On Launch Night, Australia voted between the Housemates deemed "The Most Competitive" - Michael, David & Camilla - to be made The Insider, and act as a secret saboteur in the House.
- On Day 2, Michael McCoy was voted to be The Insider. He was offered an ultimatum by Big Brother, to become The Insider or be instantly evicted by Big Brother. He was to play specific pranks at Big Brother's command, to work against and annoy other housemates, and to attempt to stymie the housemates' attempts to successfully complete assigned compulsory tasks. He had to remain undetected in these strategies and keep his role as the Insider a secret, or be automatically nominated for eviction.
- Michael McCoy failed his first mission - to make two Housemates uncomfortable by pouring a whole bottle of water on a bed - within minutes of receiving it as he did not pour the whole bottle out. He received his first strike because of it.
- Through his diary room discussions with Big Brother, viewers learned that David is gay but had not disclosed this to his fellow housemates. David came out to them on Wednesday, 26 April 2006.
- Gaelan won the first Big Brother Friday Night Live 2006, and chose runner-up Katie as his partner in the Rewards Room. The theme was Cavemen.
- A new twist was revealed to the Housemates; a fourth prize would be awarded to the winner of Friday Night Live. Three sealed boxes would be presented to the winner, marked 1, 2 and 3. The winner would select one box only before being allowed to open the box of their choice. The three boxes would inevitably contain a major prize (an overseas holiday), a medium-sized prize and a booby prize. The three prizes would follow a theme or be associated with each other in a homonymous manner (e.g. Cambodia, camera, Camembert).
- The three boxes were presented to Gaelan. They contained a trip to Thailand, a Thai banquet for all of the Housemates for the following night, and a large red bow tie. Gaelan chose the box containing the novelty bow tie.
- Krystal revealed to the house that Karen was her mother.
- On Day 8, Big Brother asked housemates to nominate which two they found 'Most Annoying'. The two who had the highest nominations were Anna and Camilla. They were both evicted from the house but unknown to the remaining housemates never left the compound and were sent to the Revenge Room. From there they could view the activities in the house and were given a task to enact revenge on their housemates for nominating them.
- Prize money at the end of Week 1 was $820,000.

=== Week 2 ===
- Monday, 1 May saw the first official nominations of series 6. Elise, Tilli, Claire and Dino were nominated. Michael was also up for nomination after failing his Insider task.
- On 2 May, the two isolated Housemates, Anna and Camilla, were returned to the House in Revenge Room Return. Both were immune to nomination points received during Week 3's Nominations.
- Dino wins the second Friday Night Live and takes runner-up Claire to the Rewards Room. The theme for the night is the Farmyard. The three boxes contain a trip to Cambodia, a digital camera and some Camembert cheese. Dino chooses the box containing the Camembert cheese.
- Tilli and Elise were evicted in a double eviction on 7 May.
- Prize money at the end of Week 2 was $645,000.

=== Week 3 ===
- Michael McCoy surviving eviction in week two became a controversial character within the House
- Karen, Krystal and Camilla were nominated.
- Michael McCoy's 'Insider challenge' for the week was to ensure that he was nominated by eight Housemates in the next week's nominations. Success would mean immunity from eviction for the week. He spun a complex and fictitious tale of a son called Reuben and a paternity test supposedly taken shortly before he entered the House that revealed he was not (as he had believed for nearly nine years) Reuben's biological father, in a bid to make other Housemates think he wanted to leave the house.
- Michael McCoy won Friday Night Live, choosing Ashley to join him in the Rewards Room. The theme for the night was Back To Work (an office theme). The three boxes contained a trip to China, complimentary Chinese laundry services for three Housemates for the week, and a Chinese fortune cookie. Michael McCoy chose the box containing the laundry services.
- Housemates held a mock wedding for Jamie and Katie.
- Michael McCoy's deception began tearing the house apart as Housemates did not know what to believe
- Karen was evicted on 14 May.
- Prize money at the end of Week 3 was $610,000.

=== Week 4 ===
- Michael succeeded in his Insider task to get eight housemates to nominate him and therefore was safe from eviction. Michael used his Three Point Twist to save Dino from eviction. Camilla, Ashley, Anna, David and Krystal were up for eviction.
- Michael's 'Insider' role was revealed to the house by Big Brother. Many housemates felt that Michael had betrayed them.
- All three Intruders, Rob, Jade and Danielle, went into the house at different times during the night during Day 24.
- Michael and David nearly shared a kiss in the bathroom. It was later revealed by Michael on Rove Live, and also during "The Gretel Incident" that it was a joke.
- Gaelan won the rockstar-themed Friday Night Live, his second Friday Night Live win. He invited Krystal to the Rewards Room. They received a special prize: a dinner at Tiger Island (situated inside Dreamworld, but outside the Big Brother House). This prize was hailed as another of Big Brother Australia's "World Firsts", due to the notion that these two Housemates left the confines of the House as part of the game, and were returned an hour later.
- Anna was evicted on 21 May.
- Jade was voted as the new Insider by the public and was notified that night.
- Prize money at the end of Week 4 was $545,000.

=== Week 5 ===
- Originally, Michael McCoy, Camilla and David were nominated. Because he won Friday Night Live, Gaelan used his Three Point Twist on David, changing the final eviction line-up to Michael McCoy, Camilla and John.
- Katie gives Dino the challenge of having to remain within 5 metres of Camilla for half the day in exchange for Katie's bread rations. When Camilla found Dino spending most of the day with her she thought he might have been interested in her.
- Katie celebrated her 20th birthday on 23 May. Big Brother threw a surprise birthday party for her in the Rewards Room. The party had a Hawaiian beach theme where all the housemates dressed in Hawaiian costumes. Dino and Intruder Danielle pash at Katie's party. Camilla was upset because she thought Dino was interested in her.
- Jade's first Insider mission was on 23 May, where she was only allowed to sing and not speak in her usual manner from sunrise to sunset. She spent the day in silence in an effort to complete her task, only having to resort to singing on a few occasions.
- On 24 May, Michael McCoy stole a number of Housemates' toothbrushes and hid them in a sock under a bed in an effort to create conflict and entertainment within the House. The housemates never found the toothbrushes despite Big Brother showing the housemates where they were located. Michael McCoy never admitted he was the culprit. Michael did all of this of his own accord, having been relieved of his Insider role the previous week.
- Intruder Danielle won Friday Night Live, and chose John to join her in the Rewards Room. The theme for the night was Horror Night. The three boxes contained a trip to South Africa, a motor scooter and a salad sandwich. Danielle chose the box containing the sandwich.
- Camilla received a $5,000 fine for entering the rewards room which only Danielle and John were allowed in. This brought the fine total to $500,000.
- Michael McCoy was evicted from the House on 28 May. His farewell message implicated another housemate in the theft of the toothbrushes.
- Prize money at the end of Week 5 was $500,000.

=== Week 6 ===
- Big Brother played the video of Michael Mccoy stealing the toothbrushes before nomination.
- Originally in general nominations, Jade, Dino, Camilla and Krystal were nominated. Because Danielle won the Friday Night Games, Danielle used her Three Point Twist on Krystal, removed Krystal from the list of nominees.
- Under the Radar nominations took place on Day 38 (29 May). This allowed the public to nominate a housemate on the basis of whether they have been using the "under the radar" strategy. Big Brother chose Krystal, John, Gaelan, Clare, Ashley as the Under the Radar candidates and viewer votes resulted in Krystal and John being added to nominations.
- During the Nominations show, evicted housemate Michael McCoy and host Gretel Killeen have a heated interview about whether Big Brother used editing techniques to misconstrue an incident where Michael appeared to express a desire to kiss David. Killeen strongly defended the series, insisting that misleading editing techniques are not used. McCoy claims the kissing incident was a joke but that by cutting the shot too soon, it appeared in the footage as broadcast to be serious. Killeen clearly appeared uneasy and ambivalent about defending the actions of the Big Brother program when later in the Nominations show, she apologised to Michael McCoy and the 'full' footage is shown. This includes only a few seconds extra of footage, albeit from a different angle, in which it appears the move by David and Michael to kiss each other may have been a joke.
- Katie was the winner of Friday Night Live, and choose Jamie to join her in the rewards room. The theme was Caribbean. The prizes in the three boxes were a dreadlock, a motor scooter and a $1,000 JeansWest gift voucher. Katie selected the box with the motor scooter. (She was the first housemate to pick the best prize in this series.)
- Jade succeeded in her Insider task which gave her a one-week immunity from nominations in the next week if she survived eviction on 3 June.
- Jade and Dino were evicted on Day 43, 4 June.
- Prize money at the end of Week 6 was $470,000.

=== Week 7 ===
- Rob, Danielle and Camilla were nominated for eviction. Katie used her 3-point twist from winning Friday Night Live to remove points from Camilla—even though she nominated her herself—and this did not affect the nominations.
- Danielle's 19th birthday was on Day 47 (8 June 2006). A horror-themed birthday party, themed by the housemates' current task, took place. During the party Danielle incurred a $5000 fine and was sent to the Punishment Room to clean dirty dentures after speaking without her microphone.
- David won a World Cup themed Friday Night Live and takes Camilla to the Rewards Room. The Three Boxes contained a Vietnam trekking holiday, an Xbox 360 and a photo of the ex-housemates. David picked the box containing the holiday.
- Danielle was evicted on Day 50, 11 June.
- Prize money at the end of Week 7 was $390,000.

=== Week 8 ===
- Ashley, David, Jamie and Katie were nominated for eviction. David used his Three Point Twist on Ashley, changing the eviction line-up to David, Jamie and Katie. This was the first week Camilla had not been nominated where she was eligible to be nominated.
- Jamie, Katie and John each received a strike for discussing nominations.
- John won "Pommy Night", a British-themed Friday Night Live and took Claire into the Rewards Room with him. The three boxes contained a digital camera, a mug and a trip to Africa. He picked Box 3, and won a digital camera.
- Claire celebrated her 23rd birthday on 17 June, and had an animal-themed birthday party where the housemates had to dress up in animal costumes.
- Katie was evicted on Day 57, 18 June.
- Prize money at the end of Week 8 was $375,000.

=== Week 9 ===
- Camilla, Jamie and Rob were nominated for eviction. John used his Three Point Twist on Jamie, but it did not change the final lineup of nominations.
- John was given a strike and banned from Friday Night Live for discussing nominations and alluding to whom he removed points from as part of the Three Point Twist. Jamie was given a warning for the same discussion.
- Three more Intruders (Perry, Darren and Lauren) entered the house on 21 June's (Day 60) Intruders – Incoming show.
- Two federal government backbenchers complained about Big Brother – Adults Only, despite the show been extremely toned down this year.
- Network Ten crumbles to the pressure of these conservative MPs and pulls Adults Only from air early, announcing on 23 June 2006 that the program had "completed its season run".
- Day 62's Friday Night Live was themed "Bugs Night". and all of the games were bug related. Claire won the Friday Night Games, defeating Gaelan in the final round. After inviting Rob to join her in the Rewards Room, she won a trip to China from the three boxes.
- Krystal was injured during Day 62's Friday Night Games, and had to leave the Friday Night Live arena. She was treated by a doctor in the Spare Room, receiving nine stitches under her chin. She was also unable to compete in the following week's FNL.
- Lauren was evicted on Day 64 in a Housemates' vote where they had to decide which of the new Intruders they wanted to see go.
- Rob was evicted on Day 64.
- Prize money at the end of Week 9 was $325,000.

=== Week 10 ===
- David, Gaelan and Krystal were nominated for eviction. Claire used her Three Point Twist on David, changing the final eviction line-up to David, Gaelan, Krystal and Camilla.
- Jamie celebrated his 23rd birthday on Day 67 with a Mexican-theme party.
- David won a Chinese-themed Friday Night Live and took Perry into the rewards room. The Three Boxes contained a trip to Thailand, an Xbox 360 and a pair of chopsticks. David chose the Thailand holiday, winning him a second holiday.
- On Day 70 (1 July 2006), Ashley allegedly slapped his genitals in Camilla's face while John held her down, at approximately 04:30; Ashley and John were escorted from the house by security later that day. As a result, the Big Brother forum on the official website was taken offline until further notice after fans flooded the forum with posts discussing the incident. This was the first time the forum had been taken offline since the "Belindagate" incident of Big Brother 2003. Behind Big Brother Australia reported that the reason was for sexual harassment towards Camilla. While the housemates were made aware of this, the live feeds were cut, and in their place was an old UpLate Update of the housemates doing their Football task on a continuous loop. It was the first time in an Australian Big Brother series that a housemate was removed from the show by the show's producer, although Warwick Capper had been ejected from Celebrity Big Brother in 2002 by that show's producer after flashing his penis at a female housemate during an argument.
- On Day 70, the Rogue Traders entered the house and performed four songs for the housemates in the backyard.
- On Day 71, Gaelan was evicted from the house.
- Prize money at the end of Week 10 stood at $275,000.

=== Week 11 ===
- Darren, David, Krystal and Perry were nominated for eviction. David used his Three Point Twist on Darren, which successfully removed Darren from the eviction line-up.
- Ashley and John gave a televised interview with Gretel Killeen regarding the incident that got them removed.
- Regular episodes of Big Brother attracted higher than-normal ratings in the wake of the controversy over the removal of John and Ashley from the house.
- Housemates are told to stay indoors after helicopters from rival networks fly dangerously low over the Big Brother compound. The helicopters were news crews filming the house after the incident from the weekend.
- On Day 74, an argument between David and Krystal, Camilla and Perry escalates and David threatens to leave the house following a dispute with Perry. David stormed into the Diary Room throwing his hat and removing his microphone, ordering Big Brother to let him out. David remained in the Diary Room for ninety minutes discussing the issue with the Big Brother psychologist, before returning to the house.
- On Day 76, Darren won an American-themed Friday Night Live, and chose Krystal to accompany him to the rewards room. The three boxes contained a peanut butter and jelly sandwich, a Swiss army gadget and a trip through South America, including Bolivia and Chile. Darren chose box three, revealed to contain the Swiss army gadget.
- Shortly after Perry's eviction on Sunday, 9 July 2006, Gretel Killeen announced during the eviction show that, unbeknown to the current housemates, two new male housemates would be entering the house as replacements for Ashley and John.
- Prize money at the end of Week 11 stood at $265,000.

=== Week 12 ===
- Darren, David and Camilla were nominated for eviction. Darren used his Three Point Twist on himself. This reduction in his nomination points tally brought him into the third-place tied position with Krystal, adding Krystal to the eviction line-up.
- Day 80 (11 July) saw the induction of two new housemates entering the compound. They are 20-year-old Max and 22-year-old Chris, both from New South Wales. Unlike Intruder housemates, Chris and Max can nominate and be nominated immediately. Max entered during the special one-hour show The New Housemates, where he posed as Darren in a pirate costume, quickly being identified. Chris, was held in the revenge room, and entered the House live on Rove.
- Krystal's 20th birthday was on Day 81 (12 July 2006). She had a Hollywood-themed party.
- On Day 82, Camilla received a $5,000 fine for referring to Big Brother by another name. This fine brought the remaining prize money total to $250,000, the prize offered in the first three seasons of Big Brother Australia.
- On Day 83 (14 July 2006), Jamie wins Friday Night Live, taking Camilla to the rewards room with him.
- Darren was evicted on Day 85, with 73% of the merged vote, the highest eviction percentage this series.
- Prize money at the end of Week 12 stood at $235,000.

=== Week 13 ===
- David, Chris and Camilla were nominated for eviction. As winner of Friday Night Live, Jamie used his Three Point Twist to save Camilla. This reduction in Camilla's nomination points caused the final nominees to be David, Chris, Max, Krystal and Claire, leaving only Jamie and Camilla free from possible eviction.
- On Day 90 (21 July), Jamie won the Christmas in July-themed Friday Night Live, taking Chris with him to the rewards room. This was Jamie's second consecutive win. Jamie is presented with six mystery prizes boxes to choose from, rather than the usual three. The box he chose won him a scooter.
- In a Double Eviction on Day 92, Claire and Krystal were evicted.
- At the end of Week 13, total prize money stood at $215,000.

=== Week 14 ===
- Jamie, Max and Chris were up for eviction. As winner of Friday Night Live Jamie used his Three Point Twist to remove nomination points from himself. This successfully removed Jamie from the line-up, and resulted in David and Camilla joining the line-up of housemates up for eviction.
- A surprise eviction was held on Wednesday, 26 July (Day 95) in which Chris was evicted with 69% of the merged vote.
- After Chris's eviction Big Brother announced to the remaining four housemates that they are all nominated for eviction.
- During the Surprise Eviction show host Gretel Killeen announced that the next eviction will be on Sunday night, and it will be a double eviction.
- Network Ten advertised The Prize Fight, a special Friday Night Live, to take place on Day 97, in which the remaining housemates would have the chance to reclaim some of their lost prize money. Housemates were put to the test through a range of obstacles, varying in difficulty and value. Because of their efforts, the final four managed to secure an additional $311,000. This brought the prize money to $511,000.
- At the conclusion of The Prize Fight, Big Brother announced that the final housemate standing would win the prize money, less all fines they had accumulated during their time in the house. This means that out of $511,000 in prize money, Camilla could have won $406,000; David could have won $446,000; Jamie could have won $426,000, and did; and Max could have won $496,000.
- On Day 98, one housemate was invited into the Diary Room. Camilla entered, and received a celebratory reception as she was informed she was the 1500th visitor to the Big Brother diary room. She was then told that she, and three friends in the house, would later that day dine with Big Brother. While the housemates had their meal with Big Brother, they were oblivious to the fact that one of each had a loved one in the house, leaving a gift for them. Max's mother cooked his favourite meal and left it simmering on the stove, David's mother left his saddle and boots for him in the bedroom, Camilla's friend left her some clothes and personal possessions, and Jamie's mother left him a clean pair of fisherman pants, a new headband and a much-needed belt.
- Max and, soon after, David, were evicted on Day 99 in Final Sunday Eviction. David was the first housemate to be evicted despite his save votes outnumbering his evict votes; in this nomination Max was the only housemate to have a greater number of evict votes than save votes.
- Disqualified housemates John and Ashley were excluded from participating in the 2006 Finale; all other former Big Brother 2006 housemates appeared in the show.
- While inside the house, Jamie was announced winner of Big Brother 2006, while Camilla was runner-up.

== House ==
The Big Brother 2006 House had the following areas and facilities:

Floorplan of the Big Brother House as designed in 2006

- Kitchen
- Lounge
- Dining Room
- Bedroom (split by a dividing wall)
- Bathroom
- Sauna
- Yard
- Pool
- Gym
- Spa
- Rewards Room
- Animal enclosure
- Shop
- Friday Night Live Arena
- Air lock, Diary Room, and Eviction exit
- Punishment Room
- Spare room, which has been used as the Revenge Room and the Exit Room

== Fines ==
The Prize Fund at the beginning of Big Brother 2006 was A$1 million; however, following on from Big Brother 2005, the housemates were fined $5,000 a time for committing various offenses. In Big Brother 2006, the housemates were not allowed any grace period that Big Brother 2005 housemates experienced, and fines were awarded within minutes of all the housemates entering the House on launch night. Following the first week, the Punishment Room was revealed, where housemates were often sent after receiving their $5,000 fine from Big Brother. Housemates were also repeatedly warned that once a fine has been incurred, that money could never be regained. After final four housemates added $311,000 back to the remaining $200,000 prize money taking it to $511,000 during the last Friday Night Games they were told that whoever wins Big Brother 2006 will have all of their fines incurred during their stay deducted from the prize money. The fine tallies of the lowest and highest were from Lauren Clayton who broke the Big Brother record for receiving no fines at all since the concept developed in Big Brother 2005 and Camilla Severi who received the highest fine total in Big Brother History of $105,000.

== Friday Night Live ==
Week	Theme	Winner	Runner-up
1	Caveman	Gaelan	Katie
2	On the Farm	Dino	Claire
3	Back to Work	Michael	Ashley
4	Rockstar	Gaelan	
5	Horror	Danielle	Krystal
6	Caribbean	Katie	
7	World Cup	David	Camilla
8	Pommy	John	
9	Bugs	Claire	
10	Asian	David	
11	Yankee Doodle	Darren	
12	Ooh La La	Jamie	
13	Christmas in July	Jamie	
14	Money	Camilla	

== Nominations table ==
Color key:

Winner
Runner-up
Friday Night Live (FNL) winner
Nominated
Exempt
No Nomination
Intruder Vote
Evicted

	Week 1	Week 2	Week 3	Week 4	Week 5	Week 6	Week 7	Week 8	Week 9		Week 10	Week 11	Week 12	Week 13	Week 14			Nomination points received
	Week 1	Week 2	Week 3	Week 4	Week 5	Week 6	Week 7	Week 8	Nominations	Intruder Eviction	Week 10	Week 11	Week 12	Week 13	Day 93	Day 99	Day 100 (Finale)	Nomination points received
FNL Winner	none	Gaelan	Dino	Michael	Gaelan	Danielle	Katie	David	John	none	Claire	David	Darren	Jamie	Jamie	Housemates won $311,000		Nomination points received
Jamie	2–Michael; 1–Anna	2–Ashley; 1–Michael	2–Ashley; 1–Michael	2–Ashley; 1–Michael	2–David; 1–Michael	2–David; 1–Jade	2–Rob; 1–David	2–David; 1–Rob	2–Rob; 1–Claire	Lauren; Perry	Banned	2–David; 1–Perry	2–Darren; 1–David	2–David; 1–Chris	2–Max; 1–Chris	No nominations	Winner (Day 100)	19
Camilla	2–Anna; 1–Michael	Revenge; Room	2–Dino; 1–Gaelan	2–Michael; 1–Dino	2–Michael; 1–Claire	2–Jade; 1–Dino	2–Danielle; 1–Ashley	2–Katie; 1–Ashley	2–Gaelan; 1–Ashley	Perry; Lauren	2–Gaelan; 1–Claire	2–Perry; 1–Darren	2–Darren; 1–David	2–Claire; 1–David	2–Max; 1–Chris	No nominations	Runner-up (Day 100)	64
David	2–Dino; 1–Michael	2–Michael; 1–Krystal	2–Dino; 1–Anna	2–Ashley; 1–Michael	2–John; 1–Jamie	2–Dino; 1–Krystal	2–John; 1–Danielle	2–Jamie; 1–Katie	2–Jamie; 1–John	Lauren; Darren	2–Gaelan; 1–Camilla	2–Jamie; 1–Krystal	2–Camilla; 1–Krystal	2–Krystal; 1–Chris	2–Jamie; 1–Chris	No nominations	Evicted (Day 99)	40
Max	Not in House													2–Chris; 1–Camilla	2–Chris; 1–Camilla	No nominations	Evicted (Day 99)	8
Chris	Not in House													2–David; 1–Max	2–Max; 1–David	Evicted (Day 95)		9
Krystal	2–Anna; Camilla	Not eligible	2–Michael; 1–Anna	2–Michael; 1–Dino	2–Michael; 1–Dino	2–Jade; 1–Dino	2–Rob; 1–Katie	2–Katie; 1–Ashley	2–Jamie; 1–Rob	Perry; Lauren	2–David; 1–John	2–Perry; 1–Darren	2–David; 1–Darren	2–David; 1–Max	Evicted (Day 92)			33
Claire	2–Karen; 1–Anna	2–Michael; 1–Ashley	2–Michael; 1–Karen	2–Anna; 1–David	2–John; 1–Michael	2–Dino; 1–David	2–Gaelan; 1–Ashley	2–Katie; 1–Ashley	2–Jamie; 1–Camilla	Lauren; Perry	2–Krystal; 1–Ashley	2–Krystal; 1–Camilla	2–Camilla; 1–Krystal	2–Camilla; 1–Jamie	Evicted (Day 92)			9
Darren	Not in House									Nominated	Exempt	2–Perry; 1–Camilla	2–Camilla; 1–Claire	Evicted (Day 85)				9
Perry	Not in House									Nominated	Exempt	2–Darren; 1–David	Evicted (Day 78)					8
Gaelan	2–Karen; 1–Camilla	2–Elise; 1–Katie	2–Michael; 1–Camilla	2–Michael; 1–Anna	2–Michael; 1–Camilla	2–Jade; 1–Camilla	2–Camilla; 1–Danielle	2–Katie; 1–Camilla	2–Camilla; 1–Rob	Lauren; Perry	2–Camilla; 1–David	Evicted (Day 71)						13
Ashley	2–Camilla; 1–Anna	2–Dino; 1–Elise	2–Karen; 1–Camilla	2–David; 1–Dino	2–Camilla; 1–Dino	2–Camilla; 1–Jade	2–Camilla; 1–Krystal	2–Camilla; 1–David	2–Rob; 1–Camilla	Perry; Lauren	2–Krystal; 1–David	Ejected (Day 70)						22
John	2–Camilla; 1–Karen	2–Tilli; 1–Elise	2–Camilla; 1–Karen	2–Camilla; 1–Michael	2–David; 1–Camilla	2–Rob; 1–Camilla	2–Rob; 1–David	2–Rob; 1–David	2–Rob; 1–Camilla	Perry; Lauren	2–David; Claire	Ejected (Day 70)						10
Rob	Not in House				Exempt	2–Dino; 1–Krystal	2–Katie; 1–Jamie	2–Jamie; 1–John	2–Jamie; 1–John	Lauren; Perry	Evicted (Day 64)							21
Lauren	Not in House									Nominated	Evicted (Day 64)							N/A
Katie	2–Ashley; 1–Tilli	2–Michael; 1–Tilli	2–Krystal; 1–David	2–Dino; 1–Michael	2–Michael; 1–David	2–Gaelan; 1–Krystal	2–Rob; 1–Camilla	2–Krystal; 1–David	Evicted (Day 57)									13
Danielle	Not in House				Exempt	2–Jade; 1–Ashley	2–Camilla; 1–Ashley	Evicted (Day 50)										4
Dino	2–Camilla; 1–Ashley	2–Elise; 1–Michael	2–Karen; 1–Krystal	2–Camilla; 1–Michael	2–Camilla; 1–Krystal	2–Jade; 1–Camilla	Evicted (Day 43)											24
Jade	Not in House				Exempt	2–Krystal; 1–Dino	Evicted (Day 43)											12
Michael	2–Camilla; 1–Karen	2–Elise; 1–Ashley	2–Karen; 1–Krystal	2–Krystal; 1–Camilla	2–Krystal; 1–Camilla	Evicted (Day 36)												47
Anna	2–Krystal; 1–Gaelan	Revenge Room	2–Karen; 1–Krystal	2–Michael; 1–Krystal	Evicted (Day 29)													16
Karen	2–Camilla; 1–Anna	2–Michael; 1–Gaelan	Not eligible	Evicted (Day 22)														16
Elise	2–Michael; 1–Anna	2–Claire; 1–Tilli	Evicted (Day 15)															10
Tilli	2–Anna; 1–Camilla	2–Elise; 1–Michael	Evicted (Day 15)															5
Notes	1	2	3	4	5	6	none	7	none	8	9	10	none		11			
Nominated (pre-Three Point Twist)	none	Ashley, Elise, Tilli	Camilla, Dino, Karen, Krystal	Ashley, Camilla, Dino	Camilla, David, Michael	Camilla, Dino, Jade, Krystal	Camilla, Danielle, Rob	Ashley, David, Jamie, Katie	Camilla, Jamie, Rob	none	David, Gaelan, Krystal	Darren, David, Krystal, Perry	Camilla, Darren, David	Camilla, Chris, David	Chris, Jamie, Max	none		
Three Point Twist	none	Ashley	Dino	Dino	David	Krystal	Camilla	Ashley	Jamie	none	David	Darren	Darren	Camilla	Jamie	none		
Against public vote	none	Claire, Dino, Elise, Michael, Tilli	Camilla, Karen, Krystal	Anna, Ashley, Camilla, David, Krystal	Camilla, John, Michael	Camilla, Dino, Jade, John, Krystal	Camilla, Danielle, Rob	David, Jamie, Katie	Camilla, Jamie, Rob	Darren, Lauren, Perry	Camilla, David, Gaelan, Krystal	David, Krystal, Perry	Camilla, Darren, David, Krystal	Chris, Claire, David, Krystal, Max	Camilla, Chris, David, Max	Camilla, David, Jamie, Max	Camilla, Jamie	
Ejected	none										John, Ashley	none						
Evicted	Camilla; 13 of 45 points to fake evict	Tilli; 20% to evict	Karen; 36% to evict	Anna; 25% to evict	Michael; 25% to evict	Jade; 8% to evict	Danielle; 44% to evict	Katie; 64% to evict	Rob; 55% to evict	Lauren; 1 net vote to evict	Gaelan; 51% to evict	Perry; 64% to evict	Darren; 73% to evict	Claire; 49% to evict	Chris; 69% to evict	Max; 10% to evict	Camilla; 47% to save	
Evicted	Anna; 11 of 45 points to fake evict	Elise; 5% to evict	Karen; 36% to evict	Anna; 25% to evict	Michael; 25% to evict	Dino; 5% to evict	Danielle; 44% to evict	Katie; 64% to evict	Rob; 55% to evict	Lauren; 1 net vote to evict	Gaelan; 51% to evict	Perry; 64% to evict	Darren; 73% to evict	Krystal; 34% to evict	Chris; 69% to evict	David; 17% to save	Jamie; 53% to save	

=== Notes ===
- ^Note 1: This Week Housemates nominated in a special round of "most annoying" nominations. The two Housemates with the most nomination points would be given a fake eviction and moved into the Revenge Room, where they would be able to watch their fellow Housemates, see who nominated them, and enact their revenge without their fellow Housemates knowing. Anna and Camilla received the most nomination points and were moved into the Revenge Room, where they remained for forty-eight hours.
- ^Note 2: Anna and Camilla were in the Revenge Room during this week's nominations and could not nominate, nor be nominated. Because Michael failed his Insider task to expose the relationship between Karen & Krystal, he automatically faced the public vote. This week Karen and Krystal nominated as a single entity, represented by Karen.
- ^Note 3: Michael was immune from nominations after he passed his Insider Mission. Karen and Krystal nominated as one entity represented by Krystal.
- ^Note 4: Michael was set an Insider Mission to be nominated by at least eight Housemates — and as nine Housemates nominated him, he passed and was immune from nomination this week.
- ^Note 5: Michael's Insider position was relinquished and his eligibility for nomination no longer rested upon Insider Missions. Jade was voted by Australia as the new Insider during Week 5's Eviction Show. New Housemates Danielle, Jade and Rob were exempt from the nomination process in their first week in the house. Michael and Katie were each awarded an extra point by Big Brother for giving poor nomination reasons.
- ^Note 6: After nominations, which saw Camilla, Dino, Jade and Krystal nominated, for Danielle to save Krystal using the three-point twist—reducing the line-up to Camilla, Dino and Jade. After nominations Big Brother nominated five other Housemates considered to be operating "under the radar"—deliberately staying quiet and avoiding controversy to avoid nomination. The five nominees were Ashley, Claire, Gaelan, John, and Krystal, and Australia voted for two more to be added to the final nomination lineup. The public chose Krystal (31%) and John (30%) to be nominated, joining Camilla, Dino, and Jade in facing Australia's Vote for a double eviction. Finally, while Jade succeeded in her first Insider Mission in Week 6 - to sabotage the weekly task - she was evicted before her Nomination Immunity could be awarded for Week 7.
- ^Note 7: Big Brother penalised Ashley and Katie with one extra point each for not giving valid nomination reasons.
- ^Note 8: Shortly before Rob's eviction, the Housemates voted in an Intruder Eviction between Darren, Lauren and Perry. Housemates voted for the Intruder they would like to evict (top of Nomination Box) and one they would like to save (bottom of Nomination Box). When the Intruder's save votes were deducted from their evict votes, Lauren had one net-vote against her and was evicted shortly before Rob.
- ^Note 9: New Housemates Darren and Perry were exempt from the nomination process. Big Brother penalised John with a point after he failed to give adequate reasons for nominating. Jamie lost his voting privileges as a result of rule breaches regarding the discussion of nominations. Despite the removal and disqualification of John and Ashley on Day 70, Gaelan's eviction still took place on Day 71.
- ^Note 10: Big Brother penalised both Claire and Perry with one point for giving inadequate nomination reasons.
- ^Note 11: Week 14 was the final week. After the Final Nominations, Chris was evicted in a Surprise Eviction on Day 95. Then all Housemates were nominated for a Double Eviction for the Final Sunday Eviction on Day 99, in which Max and David were Evicted. Finally, for the next 24 hours, Australia voted for the winner of Big Brother Australia 2006, between Camilla or Jamie. The Final Friday Night Live was held with the Housemates competing as a team to win back lost prize money; these games had no impact on the Nominations or Evictions.

== Special episodes ==
A number of special episodes aired during the original run of the season. These included:

=== The Insider ===
The Insider was a live show, broadcast on Day 2, where the result of the Insider public vote was revealed. Viewers had to vote for whether David, Camilla or Michael should be appointed the Insider. The Daily Show was broadcast as part of The Insider. Hosted by Gretel Killeen. Michael McCoy was selected as the insider. Michael McCoy (born 16 June 1980) is a political science student from Sydney, New South Wales. He is of Anglo-Celtic and Filipino descent. Michael was the first housemate to enter the Big Brother House this year. On Day 2, he was given the task of the Insider by Big Brother, having been chosen by the viewing public. If he succeeded in his tasks, he would be immune from being nominated, but if he failed he would automatically be put up for eviction.

He failed his first mission within minutes of being assigned it, which required him to secretly spill water on a bed occupied by two housemates. Michael chose to spill water on Gaelan's bed, which at the time was occupied only by Gaelan. As he had also failed to empty the entire bottle, he received his first strike. He was subsequently given further missions, one of which required him to be nominated by at least eight fellow housemates in the next round of nominations. To complete the mission, he fabricated a story about a custody dispute involving his young son, Reuben, claiming that he wanted to leave the house to deal with the matter. Despite no longer being the Insider, Michael continued to cause conflict during Week 5 by hiding cutlery and the housemates' toothbrushes, refusing to reveal their locations even after his eviction and attempting to create uncertainty over whether another Insider remained in the house. He was the fifth housemate to be evicted, on Day 36, receiving 20% of the merged vote. Michael subsequently appeared on Rove Live. During the appearance, host Rove McManus remarked, "don't do that, you're not The Rock", after Michael raised his eyebrow, prompting Michael to respond that McManus was not as funny as the show's co-host Peter Helliar.

=== Surprise Eviction ===
Surprise Eviction was a live show that was broadcast on the first Sunday (Day 8) following Launch, where the housemates each had to vote for two of the housemates that they wanted to see evicted. Kept hidden from them was that the two housemates with the most votes, Anna and Camilla, were not evicted; but were sent to the Revenge Room to secretly cause havoc on the house. Hosted by Gretel Killeen.

=== Unforgettable ===
Unforgettable was a special live show aired on Day 9. Hosted by Gretel Killeen.

=== Revenge Room Return ===
Revenge Room Return was a special live show aired on Day 10, two days after Anna and Camilla were evicted to the Revenge Room in Special Eviction. The one-hour episode incorporated the Daily Show. It ended with Anna and Camilla re-entering the house as John's special birthday gift. Hosted by Gretel Killeen.

=== Intruders Go In ===
Intruders Go In was a live special held on Day 24 (16 May 2006), when housemates Rob, Danielle and Jade were revealed and entered the House as Intruders throughout the night. Footage of Michael being revealed as the Insider to the housemates was also shown, including the reaction of the housemates. Rob entered first towards the end of the special. Jade entered the house shortly before Rove Live, and Danielle entered during UpLate.

=== Truth, Lies, Eviction ===
Truth, Lies, Eviction was a live show used on Day 36. Big Brother felt that some housemates were lying or holding back on things about themselves, therefore flying Under the Radar. On Day 35, each housemate went into the diary room and was asked some questions. A lie-risk detector, said to be 90% accurate, was used to determine from the frequency of their voice whether or not they were lying. They weren't informed that a lie detector was used, or what the information would be used for until during Truth, Lies, Eviction was broadcast. The show also featured Michael's eviction, and the Daily Show was broadcast as part of Truth, Lies, Eviction.

=== Under the Radar ===
Under the Radar was a show that aired during Day 38. Based on the results of Day 36's Truth, Lies, Eviction show, Big Brother selected five housemates that he felt were not contributing to the house, who were intentionally acting in a reserved manner to avoid conflict and thereby avoid being nominated, or flying Under the Radar. These housemates were up for a 24-hour public vote to decide which of them would be added to the list of housemates up for eviction that week. The public vote started on Day 37's Nominations show. The housemates Big Brother felt were "flying under the radar" were Ashley, Claire, Gaelan, John and Krystal. Based on viewer votes John and Krystal were added to the list of housemates up for eviction. On Eviction night, neither of them were evicted.

=== Intruders – Incoming ===
Intruders – Incoming was a live show that was broadcast on Day 60 (21 June 2006). In the show, new Intruders Darren and Perry entered the house. Lauren entered the House later, in UpLate. The Daily Show was broadcast as part of Intruders – Incoming. The show was hosted by Gretel Killeen.

=== Housemates on Trial ===
Housemates on Trial was a live show that aired on Day 67 (28 June 2006). This special replaced a previously advertised special where housemates were to be hypnotised by hypnotist, Peter Powers, because not enough housemates consented to being hypnotised for enough footage to be produced for a special. In this special, Housemates were asked a series of questions previously submitted by viewers and were run through a Layered Voice Analysis device to determine how honest the housemates were with their answers. This device did not require housemates to give yes or no answers. This special ran in a similar format to the previous special Truth, Lies, Eviction, except without an Eviction. The show was hosted by Gretel Killeen.

=== The New Housemates ===
The New Housemates was a live show aired on Day 80 (11 July 2006), where new housemates Max and Chris, both from New South Wales, entered the house to replace Ashley and John. Unlike Intruders, Chris and Max could nominate and be nominated immediately (the next opportunity to nominate would be six days later). Max entered during the special one-hour show, where he posed as Darren in a pirate costume, quickly being identified. Chris entered live during Rove. The Daily Show was broadcast as part of The New Housemates.

=== Surprise Eviction ===
Surprise Eviction was a live show on Day 95 (26 July 2006), in which the Housemates were surprised by a special mid-week Eviction. The show was hosted by Gretel Killeen.

=== The Prize Fight ===
The Prize Fight was a special Friday Night Live that was broadcast on Day 97 (28 July 2006). This was the last Friday Night Live of Big Brother 2006. The housemates were told by Big Brother that there would be no Rewards Room, Three Boxes, or Three Point Twist to compete for; and no chores to allocate; but would instead be given the opportunity to win any amount up to $416,000 to add to the prize fund of $200,000, depending on what percentage of the games they successfully completed. Ryan Fitzgerald, co-host of Friday Night Live, was involved in one of the games, as an "Ex-Professional Football Player". At the end of the games, the housemates were told that they added $311,000 to the prize fund, giving the winner the opportunity to win $511,000, less all the fines the winning housemate had incurred during their stay in the Big Brother House as they were all repeatedly warned that their fine money could never be regained.

- While in the house, Max received fines totaling $15,000. If Max won Big Brother 2006, he would have received $496,000.
- While in the house, David received fines totaling $65,000. If David won Big Brother 2006, he would have received $446,000.
- While in the house, Jamie received fines totaling $85,000; and he received $426,000 as winner of Big Brother 2006.
- While in the house, Camilla received fines totaling $105,000; more than any other housemate in Big Brother history. Therefore, if Camilla had won Big Brother 2006, she would have received $406,000.

=== Surprise Visit ===
Surprise Visit was the last Daily Show of Big Brother 2006, and was broadcast on Day 99 (30 July 2006). Camilla became the 1500th Housemate to use the Diary Room, and won a date with Big Brother with three friends of her choice - which were the other three housemates in the House, by default. While they were in the Diary Room on their "date", David's, Jamie's and Max's mothers, and Camilla's best friend, had entered the House to cook a special dinner and leave items that the housemates would recognise. After their departure, the housemates were allowed back into the House to watch a video message from their loved ones while they were in the House. Hosted by Gretel Killeen.

=== Final Sunday Double Eviction ===
Final Sunday Double Eviction was the last Eviction of Big Brother 2006, and was broadcast live in front of an audience on Day 99 (30 July 2006) from Dreamworld, and was hosted by Gretel Killeen. It was during this show that Max and David were evicted. On Day 98, the Final Four each had a separate discussion with Gretel in the Revenge Room, discussing their time in the house and what they may have regretted. During his eviction, David was nearly apparently attacked by a member of the crowd when he was making his walk through the auditorium to the Eviction stage. A security guard tackled the man, who was later revealed to be a friend of David's, to the ground, and David walked around them.

=== Finale ===
The season finale aired on Day 100 (31 July 2006) in which Jamie was announced the winner and Camilla the runner-up.

== Controversies ==
=== Sexual assault ===
On 1 July 2006, a sexual assault during which John (real name Michael Bric) held down Camilla Severi on her bed while Ashley (Michael Cox) pushed his crotch into her face, resulted in the ejection of the pair from the show. The incident and in particular the Prime Minister John Howard's comments, who called the show "stupid", were reported internationally, running on CNN and the BBC and in various other international publications. Because of the incident, Big Brother – Adults Only ended its run after politicians warned Network Ten that its screening of the show could harm its push for media reforms.

The incident sparked a high level of discussion on Internet forums where commentators were split over whether the incident was playful fun or actual assault. In many forums there was overwhelming censure of the Big Brother series itself, with many calling for the show to be cancelled. Subsequent to the controversy the program's ratings showed an increase; however, this proved to be only a temporary boost; the show's regular ratings did not show a significant overall increase and the Daily Show continued to rate significantly lower than its competitors on other commercial networks. Network Ten indicated that they planned to continue producing the series despite the barrage of criticism. In the wake of the controversy, several former housemates came forward with descriptions of audition processes that require potential housemates to parade nude, and the frequent occurrence of sexual acts in the house similar to the one that the two housemates were ejected for.

Following the removal of the two offenders the show continued as normal, with housemate Gaelan evicted via the usual procedure the following day. In an interview, Gaelan claimed that the Big Brother producers had not advised housemates on how to deal with sexual tension. On the night of 3 July, Network Ten broadcast an interview with the ejected housemates John and Ashley speaking to Big Brother host Gretel Killeen. The two stated that the incident was only "out of fun", and that they "did not mean to hurt Camilla", as they have "a great deal of respect for her".

As a result of the incident, a report by the Australian Communications and Media Authority (ACMA) was compiled a few days after the incident. The report concluded that loopholes in broadcasting rules should be closed, and Internet content regulations tightened. It was found that Big Brother itself could not be penalised as the footage was never broadcast by Network Ten but was seen only via web streaming, and the Internet falls outside ACMA's authority. Websites running the footage would not be penalised under other regulations governing web broadcasts as they had removed the footage when requested. Rival network current affairs programs A Current Affair on the Nine Network, and the Seven Network's Today Tonight, both broadcast the footage in full. Neither show faced a reprimand from ACMA as they can argue the footage was used as part of a news story. Presenting the ACMA report, Communications Minister Helen Coonan said that legislation to broaden the authority's regulatory powers to cover the Internet and mobile phone broadcasts, would be introduced into Parliament as soon as possible.

=== Michael and David's "kiss" ===
Host Gretel Killeen and evicted housemate Michael McCoy had a heated argument during the Monday live nomination show after he adamantly accused the producers of "editing" the footage with him and housemate David Graham to make it seem like they were kissing. McCoy censured that "it was great editing by Big Brother." Killeen took offense to this accusation, where she brusquely responded, "Listen mate, if you're going to tell me, when I've worked on a show for six years, that we have edited something and it has not been edited, I would like to know who told you that."

After the commercial break, Killeen apologised to McCoy, stating that she gets offended when housemates claim that the producers "edit material". At first, the show declined to air the footage of the alleged kiss, but later released the clip after objection from Michael McCoy and Big Brother fans. It was discovered that McCoy and Graham did not kiss, but only "appeared" to have kissed because they were filmed from a high-angle wide shot from behind, which gave the illusion that they were kissing. The incident and the heated interview garnered some media attention where it was labelled "The Gretel Incident" by some fans due to Gretel's aggressively defensive interviewing style with McCoy. When asked about the "Gretel Incident" on Rove Live, Michael suggested that Mike Goldman, host of Friday Night Live and Big Brother UpLate, or Ryan Fitzgerald, co-host of Friday Night Live and a former housemate, would be better suited to hosting Big Brother than Gretel Killeen.

=== Fabricated Reuben story ===
There was a controversy regarding Michael McCoy's fabricated story about “Reuben”, whom he claimed was his nine-year-old son. Michael's third task required him to persuade eight housemates to nominate him for eviction in exchange for immunity. To achieve this, he invented a son named Reuben and claimed that he could lose custody of him in an impending paternity dispute if he could not leave the Big Brother compound. The story formed part of his role as the Big Brother Insider, but several housemates believed it was a genuine family crisis and became emotionally affected by it. Michael later explained that he wanted to “mix things up” in the game and was willing to do things he would not normally do in everyday life, saying he would do whatever was necessary to fulfil his role. After Big Brother revealed to the other housemates that Michael was the Insider and that the story about Reuben was fictional, several housemates reacted angrily to having been deceived, particularly Anna, who had a strained relationship with her father. Others felt that Michael had manipulated their emotions to complete his task. On Michael's eviction night, it was revealed that Reuben was actually the name of one of Michael's real-life friends. The controversy contributed to the tension surrounding his departure from the program.

== Aftermath ==
Several 2006 housemates were contestants in an Australia's Brainiest special named Australia's Brainiest BB06 Housemate produced for Network Ten in the weeks following the end of the season. It was broadcast on 13 August 2006.

The phrase "game on, moles", coined by Anna Lind-Hansen during the 2006 series, was uttered after fellow housemate Karen, the mother of Krystal Forscutt, refused to continue sharing a bed with her following an argument. The remark became one of the program's most recognisable catchphrases and entered the Australian vernacular. Lind-Hansen later said she had no recollection of saying it, describing it as a spontaneous remark made "in the heat of the moment". 2006 Housemate David Graham appeared in Season 14 of Big Brother Australia, where past housemates merged with new players.
