= Infant moth =

Infant moth may refer to:

- Infant (Archiearis infans), a moth of the family Geometridae
- Scarce infant moth (Leucobrephos brephoides), a moth of the family Geometridae
