= Gretel Killeen =

Australian television host, author and comedian (born 1963)

- Born: 3 February 1963 (age 63); Sydney, New South Wales, Australia
- Occupations: Comedian; television presenter; author; media personality
- Years active: 1989–present
- Children: 2

Gretel Killeen (born 3 February 1963) is an Australian television presenter, media personality, comedian and author. She is known for being the host of Big Brother Australia from its inception in 2001 until the 2007 season (including Celebrity Big Brother in 2002). Killeen hosted the 2009 TV Week Logie Awards. Most recently, she was announced as the new host of The Traitors Australia.

== Career ==
=== Television ===
==== Midday ====
From 1989 to 1991, Killeen was a regular on Midday with Ray Martin on the Nine Network. She wrote and featured in the sketch A Town Like Dallas, a parody of the genre of soap opera.

==== Coast to Coast ====
In 1990, Terry Willesee, John Mangos and Killeen hosted Coast to Coast for the Nine Network after the departure of Graham Kennedy from the program, but the program in the new format was short-lived.

==== Big Brother ====
Killeen was host of Big Brother Australia, from its first season in 2001. She hosted each series up until its seventh season in 2007.

On 28 October 2007, The Sunday Telegraph reported that, as a part of a revamp of the show, Killeen was being replaced as host by Kyle Sandilands and Jackie O from 2Day FM.

==== The Traitors ====
In late 2025, she was announced as the new host of The Traitors Australia, set to air in 2026. She replaces Rodger Corser.

==== Other television roles ====
Killeen, along with Daniel MacPherson, co-hosted the Sydney New Year's Eve 2006–07 telecast and also the Australia Day eve celebrations on 25 January 2006. She was also the host of Ten's coverage of the Australia Day ceremony in 2007.

In 2009 Killeen hosted the Logies and was lowered onto the stage in an angel costume.

She played nurse Angela Mercie in two episodes of the YouTube web series The Horizon in 2013.

In 2015, Killeen co-hosted ABC TV series How Not to Behave with Matt Okine.

In 2019, Killeen appeared as a contestant on the Australian version of The Masked Singer as the Octopus, and was voted off in the first episode.

Killeen is a regular guest on morning/talk-shows such as; Studio 10, Sunrise, Today Australia and Today Extra Australia and The Project. Killeen has also appeared on Beauty and the Beast, Midday, SlideShow, Good Morning Australia, Celebrity Name Game, Q&A, Good News Week, You Have Been Watching and Talkin' 'Bout Your Generation.

In 2025, she competed in The Amazing Race Australia: Celebrity Edition with her daughter Epiphany. They were eliminated after the twelfth leg, ultimately placing fifth.

=== Radio ===
==== Nova 100 ====
In 2003, Killeen filled in on Nova 100's Hughesy, Kate & Dave whilst Kate Langbroek was on maternity leave.

=== Literary works ===
As an author of a number of books,

- The Night my Bum Dropped (2009), ISBN 978-0-670-07295-8
- How To Live With a Sausage in a Bonnet (1991), ISBN 0-09-182583-0
- Baby on Board: A Beginner's Guide to Pregnancy (1991), ISBN 1-86330-106-2
- Every Girl's Geek Guide (1992), ISBN 0-09-182697-7
- Visible Panty Line (1998), ISBN 0-14-028891-0
- Cherry Pie (1999), ISBN 0-09-183749-9
- What'll We Get for Grandma? (1999), ISBN 0-09-183869-X
- You're Joking! (2001), ISBN 1-74051-772-5

==== Fleur Trotter series ====
- My Life Is a Toilet (1994), ISBN 0-09-182850-3
- The 'My Life Is a Toilet' Instruction Book: How To Make the Most of Your Pathetic Existence (1995), ISBN 0-09-183270-5
- My Life Is a Wedgie (2000), ISBN 0-09-183955-6
- My Life Is a Boob Tube (2002), ISBN 1-74051-758-X
- My Life Is a Girdle (2003), ISBN 1-74051-899-3

==== The My Sister series ====
- My Sister's a Yoyo (1997), ISBN 0-09-183479-1
- My Sister's an Alien (1998), ISBN 0-09-183902-5
- My Sister's a Sea Slug (1999), ISBN 0-09-183954-8
- My Sister's a Burp (1999), ISBN 0-09-183962-9
- My Sister's a Full Stop (2000), ISBN 0-09-183968-8
- My Sister's a Nightmare (2000), ISBN 0-09-184079-1

==== Hot Buns & Ophelia series ====
- Hot Buns & Ophelia Get a Bloke (2000), ISBN 0-14-029965-3
- Hot Buns & Ophelia Get Shipwrecked (2001), ISBN 0-14-029966-1

==== The Very Naughty Mother series ====
- The Very Naughty Mother Goes Green (2002), ISBN 1-74051-763-6
- The Very Naughty Mother Runs Away (2003), ISBN 1-74051-764-4
- The Very Naughty Mother Goes Invisible (2003), ISBN 1-74051-906-X
- The Very Naughty Mother Is a Spy (2004), ISBN 1-74051-907-8

=== Movie roles ===
Killeen has a cameo in the Australian film Gettin' Square as Rhonda Halliwell.

=== Stage roles ===
Killeen appeared as the Narrator in a stage production of The Rocky Horror Show in Sydney and Melbourne in 2008 and in Sydney in 2024.

== Personal life ==
Killeen was born in Sydney and has two adult children from her former marriage to Mark Morgan.

== Awards ==
=== Mo Awards ===
The Australian Entertainment Mo Awards (commonly known informally as the Mo Awards), were annual Australian entertainment industry awards. They recognise achievements in live entertainment in Australia from 1975 to 2016. Gretel Killeen won one award in that time.

Year	Nominee / work	Award	Result (wins only)
2000	Gretel Killeen	Female Comedy Performer of the Year	Won
