= Baby simulator =

Electronic doll

A baby simulator or infant simulator is a lifelike electronic doll that is programmed to simulate the needs of a real baby, such as feeding, nappy changing or attention. They are used to help prospective parents or caregivers become aware of the responsibilities associated with childcare. They have been found to invoke "parental sensitivity highly correlated with parental sensitivity to one's own infant". Research has been conducted into whether programmes providing infant simulators to adolescents change their attitudes towards parenting and their related behaviour. Evidence is "not unequivocal" and a 2011 committee in the US concluded "the use of infant simulators will remain controversial" pending better research.

== See also ==
- Category:Virtual babies
