= List of Big Brother (Australian TV series) housemates =

Big Brother is an Australian reality television show, and is the Australian version of the Big Brother franchise. Contestants are referred to as "housemates," and live together in a specially constructed house that is isolated from the outside world. The housemates are continuously monitored during their stay in the house by live television cameras as well as personal audio microphones. Throughout the course of the competition, housemates are evicted from the house. The last remaining housemate wins the competition and is awarded a cash prize. The series began airing in 2001, and as of 2023, 15 seasons and 2 spin-off seasons have been broadcast.

As of season 16, there have been a total of 304 civilian housemates, 12 Celebrity Big Brother housemates and 12 Big Brother VIP housemates; 10 of which have been housemates on two seasons. There have been 14 winners of Big Brother; ten men and three women (with one woman winning twice), while the winners of Celebrity Big Brother and Big Brother VIP were both men. The youngest winner is Aleisha Lee Cowcher, who was 20 at the time of winning season 7, and the oldest is Terri Munro, who was 52 when she won season 8.

== Housemates ==
Key

Winner
Runner-up
Third place
Walked
Ejected
Housemate entered for the second time

| Series | Housemate | Age | Hometown | Status |
|---|---|---|---|---|
| 1 | Benjamin "Ben" Williams | 21 | Epping, Victoria | 1st – Winner |
| 1 | Blair McDonough | 19 | Melbourne | 2nd – Runner-up |
| 1 | Sara-Marie Fedele | 22 | Perth | 3rd – Evicted |
| 1 | Christina Davis | 27 | Sydney | 4th – Evicted |
| 1 | Jemma Gawned | 26 | Melbourne | 5th – Evicted |
| 1 | John "Johnnie" Cass | 30 | [Sydney | 6th – Evicted |
| 1 | Anita Bloomfield | 22 | Sydney | 7th – Evicted |
| 1 | Peter Timbs | 28 | Sydney | 8th – Evicted |
| 1 | Lisa Standing | 24 | Melbourne | 9th – Evicted |
| 1 | Rachel Corbett | 20 | Sydney | 10th – Evicted |
| 1 | Gordon Sloan | 28 | Melbourne | 11th – Evicted |
| 1 | Todd James | 27 | Melbourne | 12th – Evicted |
| 1 | Sharna West | 34 | Melbourne, Victoria | 13th – Evicted |
| 1 | Andrea "Andy" Silva | 25 | Sydney, New South Wales | 14th – Evicted |
| 2 | Peter Corbett | 23 | Wollongong, New South Wales | 1st – Winner |
| 2 | Nathan "Marty" Martin | 20 | Toodyay, Western Australia | 2nd – Runner-up |
| 2 | Sahra Kearney | 23 | | 3rd – Evicted |
| 2 | Jessica Hardy | 24 | Tweed Heads, New South Wales | 4th – Evicted |
| 2 | Kieran Tanner | 24 | Sydney | 5th – Evicted |
| 2 | Mirabai Peart | 21 | | 6th – Evicted |
| 2 | Alex Christie | 30 | Melbourne | 7th – Evicted |
| 2 | Nathan Morris | 25 | Perth, Western Australia | 8th – Evicted |
| 2 | Brodie Young | 24 | Melbourne | 9th – Evicted |
| 2 | Turkan Aksoy | 30 | Sydney | 10th – Evicted |
| 2 | Nicole Dickmann | 23 | Adelaide, South Australia | 11th – Evicted |
| 2 | Shannon Cleary | 31 | Sydney | 12th – Evicted |
| 2 | Aaron Benton | 24 | Wagga Wagga, New South Wales | 13th – Evicted |
| 2 | Katrina Miani | 21 | Melbourne | 14th – Evicted |
| 2 | Damian Hoo | 21 | Sydney | 15th – Evicted |
| 3 | Regina Bird | 29 | Cambridge, Tasmania | 1st – Winner |
| 3 | Chrissie Swan | 29 | Melbourne, Victoria | 2nd – Runner-up |
| 3 | Daniel McInness | 28 | Adelaide, South Australia | 3rd – Evicted |
| 3 | Patrick Flanagan | 29 | Sydney | 4th – Evicted |
| 3 | Vincent Amato | 29 | Melbourne | 5th – Evicted |
| 3 | Jamie O'Brien | 22 | Melbourne | 6th – Evicted |
| 3 | Kim Drury | 21 | Armadale, Western Australia | 7th – Evicted |
| 3 | Daniel "Saxon" Small | 19 | Central Coast, New South Wales | 8th – Evicted |
| 3 | Joanne Ashton | 23 | Adelaide, South Australia | 9th – Evicted |
| 3 | Claire Bellis | 24 | Gold Coast, Queensland | 10th – Evicted |
| 3 | Benjamin "Ben" Archbold | 28 | | 11th – Evicted |
| 3 | Belinda Thorpe | 20 | Queensland | 12th – Walked |
| 3 | Leah White | 18 | | 13th – Evicted |
| 3 | Carlo Marino | 21 | | 14th – Evicted |
| 3 | Jaime Cerda | 18 | Melbourne | 15th – Evicted |
| 3 | Irena Bukhshtaber | 29 | | 16th – Evicted |
| 4 | Trevor Butler | 30 | Broken Hill, New South Wales | 1st – Winner |
| 4 | Bree Amer | 21 | Gold Coast, Queensland | 2nd – Runner-up |
| 4 | Paul Dyer | 31 | Victoria | 3rd – Evicted |
| 4 | Ryan Fitzgerald | 27 | Adelaide, South Australia | 4th – Evicted |
| 4 | Catherine Tremolada | 33 | Albion Park, New South Wales | 5th – Evicted |
| 4 | Ashalea McWalters | 19 | Perth, Western Australia | 6th – Evicted |
| 4 | Monica De Bolso | 32 | New South Wales | 7th – Evicted |
| 4 | Wesley Dening | 20 | Brisbane, Queensland | 8th – Evicted |
| 4 | Violeta Black | 20 | Melbourne | 9th – Evicted |
| 4 | Kane Dignum | 20 | Queensland | 10th – Evicted |
| 4 | Terri Mann | 31 | Western Australia | 11th – Evicted |
| 4 | Merlin Luck | 23 | New South Wales | 12th – Evicted |
| 4 | Bree "Elle" Quartermaine | 22 | Western Australia | 13th – Evicted |
| 4 | Krystal Ince | 20 | Queensland | 14th – Evicted |
| 4 | Igor Vurmeski | 27 | Melbourne | 15th – Evicted |
| 4 | Aphrodite Vuitton | 25 | | 16th – Evicted |
| 5 | David and Greg "Logan" Matthew | 23 | Wagga Wagga, New South Wales | 1st – Winner |
| 5 | Tim Brunero | 27 | Sydney | 2nd – Runner-up |
| 5 | Vesna Tofevski | 27 | Melbourne | 3rd – Evicted |
| 5 | Melanie Smerdon | 19 | Adelaide, South Australia | 4th – Evicted |
| 5 | Richelle "Kate" Benson | 21 | Perth, Western Australia | 5th – Evicted |
| 5 | Christie Mills | 19 | Gold Coast, Queensland | 6th – Evicted |
| 5 | Rita Lazzarotto | 29 | | 7th – Evicted |
| 5 | Dean Glucina | 24 | Melbourne | 8th – Evicted |
| 5 | Simon "Hotdogs" Deering | 27 | Western Australia | 9th – Evicted |
| 5 | Heath Tournier | 20 | Grovedale, Victoria | 10th – Evicted |
| 5 | Glenn Dallinger | 21 | Stawell, Victoria | 11th – Evicted |
| 5 | Geneva Loader | 19 | Sydney | 12th – Evicted |
| 5 | Rachael Burns | 21 | | 13th – Evicted |
| 5 | Michelle Carew-Gibson | 24 | Queensland | 14th – Evicted |
| 5 | Michael Farnsworth | 27 | New South Wales | 15th – Evicted |
| 5 | Jane "Gianna" Pattison | 24 | South Australia | 16th – Evicted |
| 5 | Angela Aiken | 29 | Victoria | 17th – Evicted |
| 5 | Nelson Russell | 23 | Queensland | 18th – Evicted |
| 5 | Constance Hall | 21 | Melbourne | 19th – Evicted |
| 6 | Jamie Brooksby | 22 | Claremont, Western Australia | 1st – Winner |
| 6 | Camilla Halliwell | 22 | Victoria | 2nd – Runner-up |
| 6 | David Graham | 26 | Goondiwindi, Queensland | 3rd – Evicted |
| 6 | James "Max" Panebianco | 20 | Sydney | 4th – Evicted |
| 6 | Chris Everden | 22 | Sydney | 5th – Evicted |
| 6 | Krystal Forscutt | 19 | Batemans Bay, New South Wales | 6th – Evicted |
| 6 | Claire Madden | 22 | Sunshine Coast, Queensland | 7th – Evicted |
| 6 | Darren Bowley | 24 | Brisbane, Queensland | 8th – Evicted |
| 6 | Perry Apostolou | 39 | New South Wales | 9th – Evicted |
| 6 | Gaelan Walker | 26 | Melbourne | 10th – Evicted |
| 6 | Michael "Ashley" Cox | 20 | Rockingham, Western Australia | 11th – Ejected |
| 6 | Michael "John" Bric | 20 | Melbourne | 12th – Ejected |
| 6 | Rob Rigley | 26 | Wollongong, New South Wales | 13th – Evicted |
| 6 | Lauren Clayton | 22 | New South Wales | 14th – Evicted |
| 6 | Katie Hastings | 19 | Perth, Western Australia | 15th – Evicted |
| 6 | Danielle Foote | 18 | Adelaide, South Australia | 16th – Evicted |
| 6 | Dino Delic | 21 | Melbourne | 17th – Evicted |
| 6 | Shoshana "Jade" Stack | 19 | Penrith, New South Wales | 18th – Evicted |
| 6 | Michael McCoy | 25 | Sydney | 19th – Evicted |
| 6 | Anna Lind-Hansen | 20 | Melbourne | 20th – Evicted |
| 6 | Karen Forscutt | 36 | Batemans Bay, New South Wales | 21st – Evicted |
| 6 | Elise Chen | 21 | Sydney | 22nd – Evicted |
| 6 | Matilda "Tilli" Clapham | 19 | Adelaide, South Australia | 23rd – Evicted |
| 7 | Aleisha Lee Cowcher | 20 | Cobram, Victoria | 1st – Winner |
| 7 | Zach Douglas | 24 | Echuca, Victoria | 2nd – Runner-up |
| 7 | Travis Perkins | 32 | Pakenham, Victoria | 3rd – Evicted |
| 7 | Chris "Billy" Bentley | 23 | Sydney | 4th – Evicted |
| 7 | Zak "Zoran" Vidinovski | 23 | Queensland | 5th – Evicted |
| 7 | Joel Scalzi | 24 | South Australia | 6th – Evicted |
| 7 | Daniela Da Silva Pola | 24 | Western Australia | 7th – Evicted |
| 7 | Michelle Olsen | 33 | Western Australia | 8th – Evicted |
| 7 | Jamie McDonald | 29 | Ballarat, Victoria | 9th – Evicted |
| 7 | Thomas Haynes | 27 | Western Australia | 10th – Evicted |
| 7 | Andrew Temment | 28 | Victoria | 11th – Evicted |
| 7 | Laura Haas | 20 | Tasmania | 12th – Evicted |
| 7 | Rebecca Dent | 23 | Queensland | 13th – Evicted |
| 7 | Emma Cornell | 24 | New South Wales | 14th – Evicted |
| 7 | Susannah Murray | 30 | Melbourne | 15th – Evicted |
| 7 | Nick Sady | 25 | Victoria | 16th – Evicted |
| 7 | Hayley Zalewski | 24 | Victoria | 17th – Evicted |
| 7 | Demet Sahan | 25 | Victoria | 18th – Evicted |
| 7 | Bodie Czeladka | 24 | Western Australia | 19th – Evicted |
| 7 | Theresa-Jane "TJ" Whitlock | 22 | Darwin, Northern Territory | 20th – Evicted |
| 7 | Kate Gladman | 25 | Geelong, Victoria | 21st – Evicted |
| 7 | Harrison Rhoades | 20 | Sydney | 22nd – Evicted |
| 7 | Kara Otter | 18 | New South Wales | 23rd – Evicted |
| 7 | Travers "Cruz" Chue | 23 | Queensland | 24th – Evicted |
| 8 | Terri Munro | 52 | Sydney | 1st – Winner |
| 8 | Rory Ammon | 21 | Geelong, Victoria | 2nd – Runner-up |
| 8 | Benjamin "Ben" McCallum | 19 | Western Australia | 3rd – Third place |
| 8 | Alice Redwood | 25 | Bendigo, Victoria | 4th – Evicted |
| 8 | Travis Keyser | 20 | Sydney | 5th – Evicted |
| 8 | Edward "Cherry" Cherry | 22 | Gold Coast, Queensland | 6th – Evicted |
| 8 | Brigitte Stavaruk | 20 | Canberra, Australian Capital Territory | 7th – Evicted |
| 8 | Bianca Benigno | 18 | Queensland | 8th – Evicted |
| 8 | Terrence Hardie | 51 | Perth, Western Australia | 9th – Evicted |
| 8 | Nobuyuki "Nobbi" Tanaka | 21 | Victoria | 10th – Evicted |
| 8 | Rhianna Baxter | 25 | New South Wales | 11th – Evicted |
| 8 | Renee Black | 22 | Dubbo, New South Wales | 12th – Evicted |
| 8 | Dixie Crawford | 21 | Dubbo, New South Wales | 13th – Evicted |
| 8 | David Tchappat | 32 | Gosford, New South Wales | 14th – Evicted |
| 8 | Nathan Strempel | 27 | South Australia | 15th – Evicted |
| 8 | Rebecca Morgan | 22 | Western Australia | 16th – Evicted |
| 8 | Saxon Pepper | 22 | South Australia | 17th – Evicted |
| 8 | Craig "Barney" Barnett | 32 | Western Australia | 18th – Evicted |
| 8 | Michael Crafter | 26 | Victoria | 19th – Evicted |
| 8 | Rima Hadchiti | 25 | Victoria | 20th – Walked |
| 9 | Benjamin Norris | 32 | Melbourne | 1st – Winner |
| 9 | Layla Subritzky | 24 | Brisbane, Queensland/Hambleton, England | 2nd – Runner-up |
| 9 | Estelle Landy | 24 | Morwell, Victoria | 3rd – Third place |
| 9 | Michael Beveridge | 26 | Brisbane, Queensland | 4th – Evicted |
| 9 | Zoe Westgarth | 23 | New South Wales | 5th – Evicted |
| 9 | Sam Wallace | 21 | Gold Coast, Queensland/ Tamworth, New South Wales | 6th – Evicted |
| 9 | Stacey Wren | 24 | Sydney | 7th – Evicted |
| 9 | Angela (Angie) Murray | 21 | Gold Coast, Queensland | 8th – Evicted |
| 9 | Josh Moore | 28 | South Australia | 9th – Walked |
| 9 | Bradley Darke | 19 | Coraki, New South Wales | 10th – Evicted |
| 9 | Ava David | 29 | Victoria | 11th – Evicted |
| 9 | George Baramily | 25 | Western Australia | 12th – Evicted |
| 9 | Ray Baxter | 25 | Brisbane, Queensland | 13th – Evicted |
| 9 | Sarah Wentworth-Perry | 30 | Wagga Wagga, New South Wales | 14th – Evicted |
| 9 | Ryan Buckingham | 22 | Victoria | 15th – Evicted |
| 9 | Charne Louise | 31 | Gold Coast, Queensland | 16th – Evicted |
| 10 | Tim Dormer | 27 | Sydney | 1st – Winner |
| 10 | Jade Albany Pietrantonio | 22 | Ballina, New South Wales | 2nd – Runner-up |
| 10 | Tahan Lew-Fatt | 24 | Darwin, Northern Territory | 3rd – Third place |
| 10 | Anthony "Drew" Drew | 24 | Victoria | 4th – Evicted |
| 10 | Alex "Boog" Roe | 23 | Melbourne, Victoria | 5th – Evicted |
| 10 | Ed Lower | 26 | Adelaide, South Australia / Melbourne | 6th – Evicted |
| 10 | Madaline Cogar | 24 | Sydney | 7th – Evicted |
| 10 | Mikkayla Mossop | 24 | New South Wales | 8th – Evicted |
| 10 | Benjamin "Ben" Zabel | 30 | Queensland | 9th – Evicted |
| 10 | Nathan Little | 35 | Victoria | 10th – Walked |
| 10 | Katie and Lucy Mercer | 21 & 22 | Perth, Western Australia | 11th – Evicted |
| 10 | Justynn Harcourt | 33 | New South Wales | 12th – Evicted |
| 10 | Tully Smyth | 25 | Sydney | 13th – Evicted |
| 10 | Matthew "Matt" Filippi | 27 | Sunshine Coast, Queensland | 14th – Evicted |
| 10 | Heidi Anderson | 29 | Newcastle, New South Wales | 15th – Evicted |
| 10 | Caleb Geppert | 33 | Melbourne | 16th – Evicted |
| 10 | Jasmin Aguilera | 24 | Victoria | 17th – Evicted |
| 10 | Xavier Holland | 27 | Victoria | 18th – Evicted |
| 10 | Rohan Mirchandaney | 24 | Melbourne | 19th – Evicted |
| 10 | Sharon Smith | 41 | Victoria | 20th – Evicted |
| 11 | Ryan Ginns | 26 | Sydney | 1st – Winner |
| 11 | Travis Lunardi | 24 | Melbourne | 2nd – Runner-up |
| 11 | Skye Wheatley | 20 | Gold Coast, Queensland | 3rd – Third place |
| 11 | Priya Malik | 27 | Adelaide, South Australia | 4th – Evicted |
| 11 | Penny Higgs | 30 | Melbourne | 5th – Evicted |
| 11 | Lina Grant | 24 | Melbourne | 6th – Evicted |
| 11 | David Hodis | 31 | Sydney | 7th – Evicted |
| 11 | Ryan "Leo" Burke | 30 | Gold Coast, Queensland / Canada | 8th – Evicted |
| 11 | Richard Hordern-Gibbings | 25 | Sydney | 9th – Evicted |
| 11 | Tom Mackay | 26 | Sydney | 10th – Evicted |
| 11 | Kate "Cat" Law | 31 | Melbourne | 11th – Evicted |
| 11 | Aisha Mckinnon | 22 | Sydney / New Zealand | 12th – Evicted |
| 11 | Lawson Reeves | 23 | Perth, Western Australia | 13th – Evicted |
| 11 | Marina Rakovskaia | 30 | Adelaide, South Australia / Kazakhstan | 14th – Evicted |
| 11 | Jason Roses | 26 | Canberra, Australian Capital Territory | 15th – Evicted |
| 11 | Sandra Nixon | 30 | Wagga Wagga, New South Wales | 16th – Evicted |
| 11 | Sam Bramham | 26 | Melbourne | 17th – Evicted |
| 11 | Lisa Clark | 29 | Sydney | 18th – Evicted |
| 11 | Jake Richardson | 25 | Brisbane, Queensland | 19th – Evicted |
| 11 | Katie Schepis | 25 | Sydney | 20th – Evicted |
| 11 | Dion Kallis | 24 | Brisbane, Queensland | 21st – Evicted |
| 11 | Gemma Kinghorn | 29 | Perth, Western Australia | 22nd – Evicted |
| 12 | Chad Hurst | 27 | Campbelltown | 1st – Winner |
| 12 | Daniel Gorringe | 27 | Melbourne | 2nd – Runner-up |
| 12 | Sophie Budack | 25 | Darwin | 2nd – Runner-up |
| 12 | Mat Garrick | 30 | Broken Hill | 4th – Evicted |
| 12 | Sarah McDougal | 19 | Melbourne | 5th – Evicted |
| 12 | Kieran Davidson | 21 | Adelaide | 6th – Walked |
| 12 | Casey Mazzucchelli | 25 | Perth | 7th – Evicted |
| 12 | Marissa Rancan | 61 | Sydney | 8th – Evicted |
| 12 | Xavier Molyneux | 23 | Sydney | 9th – Evicted |
| 12 | Hannah Campbell | 26 | Perth | 10th – Evicted |
| 12 | Angela Clancy | 37 | Perth | 11th – Evicted |
| 12 | Shane Vincent | 39 | Tweed Heads, New South Wales | 12th – Evicted |
| 12 | Zoe George | 39 | Melbourne | 13th – Evicted |
| 12 | Garth Saville | 50 | Sydney | 14th – Evicted |
| 12 | Ian Joass | 25 | Perth | 15th – Evicted |
| 12 | Danni Keogh | 34 | Townsville | 16th – Evicted |
| 12 | Talia Rycroft-Sommariva | 21 | Adelaide | 17th – Evicted |
| 12 | SooBong Hwang | 48 | Adelaide | 18th – Evicted |
| 12 | Allan Liang | 30 | Sydney | 19th – Evicted |
| 12 | Laura Coriakula | 25 | Melbourne | 20th – Evicted |
| 13 | Marley Biyendolo | 25 | Melbourne, Victoria | 1st – Winner |
| 13 | Christina Podolyan | 21 | Melbourne, Victoria | 2nd – Runner-up |
| 13 | Sarah Jane "SJ" Adams | 65 | Sydney, New South Wales | 2nd – Runner-up |
| 13 | Ari Kimber | 22 | Sydney, New South Wales | 4th – Evicted |
| 13 | Daniel Hayes | 48 | Geelong, Victoria | 5th – Evicted |
| 13 | Sid Pattni | 34 | Perth, Western Australia | 6th – Evicted |
| 13 | Adriana Fernandez | 53 | Wollongong, New South Wales | 7th – Evicted |
| 13 | Tilly Whitfeld | 20 | Sydney, New South Wales | 8th – Evicted |
| 13 | Charlotte McCristal | 25 | Melbourne, Victoria | 9th – Evicted |
| 13 | Mary Kalifatidis | 55 | Melbourne, Victoria | 10th – Evicted |
| 13 | Jess Trend | 29 | Melbourne, Victoria | 11th – Evicted |
| 13 | Brenton Balicki | 31 | Sydney, New South Wales | 12th – Evicted |
| 13 | Mitch Giles | 26 | Perth, Western Australia | 13th – Evicted |
| 13 | Gabe Christe | 27 | Brisbane, Queensland | 14th – Walked |
| 13 | Charlotte Hall | 23 | Brisbane, Queensland | 15th – Evicted |
| 13 | Alex McCristal | 25 | Melbourne, Victoria | 16th – Evicted |
| 13 | Katie Williams | 26 | Sydney, New South Wales | 17th – Evicted |
| 13 | Melissa McGorman | 33 | Cambrai, South Australia | 18th – Evicted |
| 13 | Nick Benton | 29 | Adelaide, South Australia | 19th – Evicted |
| 13 | Mitchell Spencer | 26 | Cairns, Queensland | 20th – Evicted |
| 13 | Carlos Castro | 39 | Perth, Western Australia | 21st – Evicted |
| 13 | Christopher Wayne | 37 | Brisbane, Queensland | 22nd – Evicted |
| 13 | Michael Brown | 29 | Perth, Western Australia | 23rd – Evicted |
| 13 | Renata Bubeniene | 45 | Adelaide, South Australia | 24th – Evicted |
| 13 | Lillian Ahenkan | 26 | Sydney, New South Wales | 25th – Evicted |
| 13 | Max Beattie | 28 | Gold Coast, Queensland | 26th – Evicted |
| 14 | Regina "Reggie" Sorensen | 48 | Queensland | 1st – Winner |
| 14 | Johnson Ashak | 25 | Maroubra, New South Wales | 2nd – Runner-up |
| 14 | Taras Hrubyj-Piper | 34 | Bondi Beach/Clovelly, New South Wales | 2nd – Runner-up |
| 14 | Brenton Parkes | 26 | Sydney, New South Wales | 4th – Evicted |
| 14 | Aleisha Campbell | 24 | New South Wales | 5th – Evicted |
| 14 | Tim Dormer | 37 | Sydney, New South Wales | 6th – Evicted |
| 14 | Estelle Landy | 33 | Queensland | 7th – Evicted |
| 14 | Gabbie Keevill | 22 | Central Coast, New South Wales | 8th – Evicted |
| 14 | Jaycee Edwards | 23 | Perth, Western Australia | 9th – Evicted |
| 14 | Anthony Drew | 33 | Victoria | 10th – Evicted |
| 14 | Tully Smyth | 34 | Melbourne, Victoria | 11th – Evicted |
| 14 | Jules Rangiheuea | 28 | Sydney, New South Wales | 12th – Evicted |
| 14 | David "Dave" Graham | 42 | New South Wales | 13th – Evicted |
| 14 | Sam Manovski | 31 | Peregian Beach, Queensland | 14th – Evicted |
| 14 | Lulu Oliveira | 39 | Brisbane, Queensland | 15th – Evicted |
| 14 | Trevor Butler | 48 | Broken Hill, New South Wales | 16th – Evicted |
| 14 | Joel Notley | 27 | Newcastle, New South Wales | 17th – Evicted |
| 14 | Lara Phillips | 52 | Bateau Bay, New South Wales | 18th – Evicted |
| 14 | Layla Subritzky | 34 | Brisbane, Queensland | 19th – Evicted |
| 14 | Mel Todd | 41 | Melbourne, Victoria | 20th – Evicted |
| 14 | Josh Goudswaard | 32 | Byron Bay, New South Wales | 21st – Evicted |
| 15 | Tay & Ari Wilcoxson | 23 & 20 | Queensland | 1st – Winner |
| 15 | Louis Phillips | 23 | Melbourne, Victoria | 2nd – Runner-up |
| 15 | Mineé Marx | 22 | Perth, Western Australia | 2nd – Runner-up |
| 15 | Taylah Davies | 27 | Victoria | 4th – Evicted |
| 15 | Josh Everett | 20 | Sydney, New South Wales | 5th – Evicted |
| 15 | Dion Prasad | 26 | Melbourne, Victoria | 6th – Evicted |
| 15 | Lewis Beers | 26 | Victoria | 7th – Evicted |
| 15 | Graciemae Sinclair | 26 | New South Wales | 8th – Evicted |
| 15 | Teejay Halkias | 26 | Brisbane | 9th – Evicted |
| 15 | Oli Walton | 24 | Perth, Western Australia | 10th – Evicted |
| 15 | Jake Vella | 25 | Victoria | 11th – Evicted |
| 15 | Maddi-Rose McGuire | 19 | Central Coast, New South Wales | 12th – Walked |
| 15 | Bella Sommers | 25 | Melbourne, Victoria | 13th – Evicted |
| 15 | Zach Davis | 22 | Victoria | 14th – Evicted |
| 15 | Luke Hallinan | 33 | Sydney, New South Wales | 15th – Evicted |
| 15 | Annelise Drake | 24 | Gold Coast, Queensland | 16th – Evicted |
| 15 | AnnaSophia Lambrou | 30 | New South Wales | 17th – Evicted |
| 15 | Quan Ja | 33 | Victoria | 18th – Evicted |
| 16 | Coco Beeby | 30 | New South Wales | 1st – Winner |
| 16 | Emily Dale | 30 | Perth, Western Australia | 2nd – Runner-up |
| 16 | Colin Ridley | 21 | Wollongong, New South Wales | 3rd – Evicted |
| 16 | Bruce Dunne | 25 | Sunshine Coast, Queensland | 4th – Evicted |
| 16 | Allana Jackson | 45 | Gold Coast, Queensland | 5th – Walked |
| 16 | Conor Maysey | 31 | Gold Coast, Queensland | 6th – Evicted |
| 16 | Edward Doak | 30 | Adelaide, South Australia | 7th – Evicted |
| 16 | Vincent "Vinnie" Brigante | 21 | Melbourne, Victoria | 8th – Evicted |
| 16 | Holly Young | 31 | Perth, Western Australia | 9th – Evicted |
| 16 | Abiola Oreyomi | 24 | Victoria | 10th – Walked |
| 16 | Mia Wijewardene | 23 | Victoria | 11th – Evicted |
| 16 | Jane Marshall-Doherty | 67 | Melbourne, Victoria | 12th – Evicted |
| 16 | Michael Downs | 49 | Sydney | 13th – Evicted |
| 17 | Andrew "Marshy" Marschall | 24 | South Australia | Participating |
| 17 | Anita Bingham | 47 | Tasmania | Participating |
| 17 | Austin Hendrey | 22 | Queensland | Participating |
| 17 | Charity Bosco | 29 | New South Wales | Participating |
| 17 | Ebony Vandermont | 23 | Victoria | Participating |
| 17 | Heath Slater | 23 | Gold Coast, Queensland | Participating |
| 17 | Kyrah Brock-Fenton | 25 | Sydney, New South Wales | Participating |
| 17 | Matthew Karlsson | 37 | Victoria | Participating |
| 17 | Matthew "Matty" Michael | 39 | Western Australia | Participating |
| 17 | Ryan Macri | 27 | New South Wales | Participating |
| 17 | Tahlia Macri | 25 | Victoria | Participating |
| 17 | Pheobe Joyce | 26 | Queensland | 12th – Evicted |
| 17 | Pam Davidson | 62 | Adelaide, South Australia | 13th – Evicted |
| 17 | Harmon Singh | 29 | Queensland | 14th – Evicted |

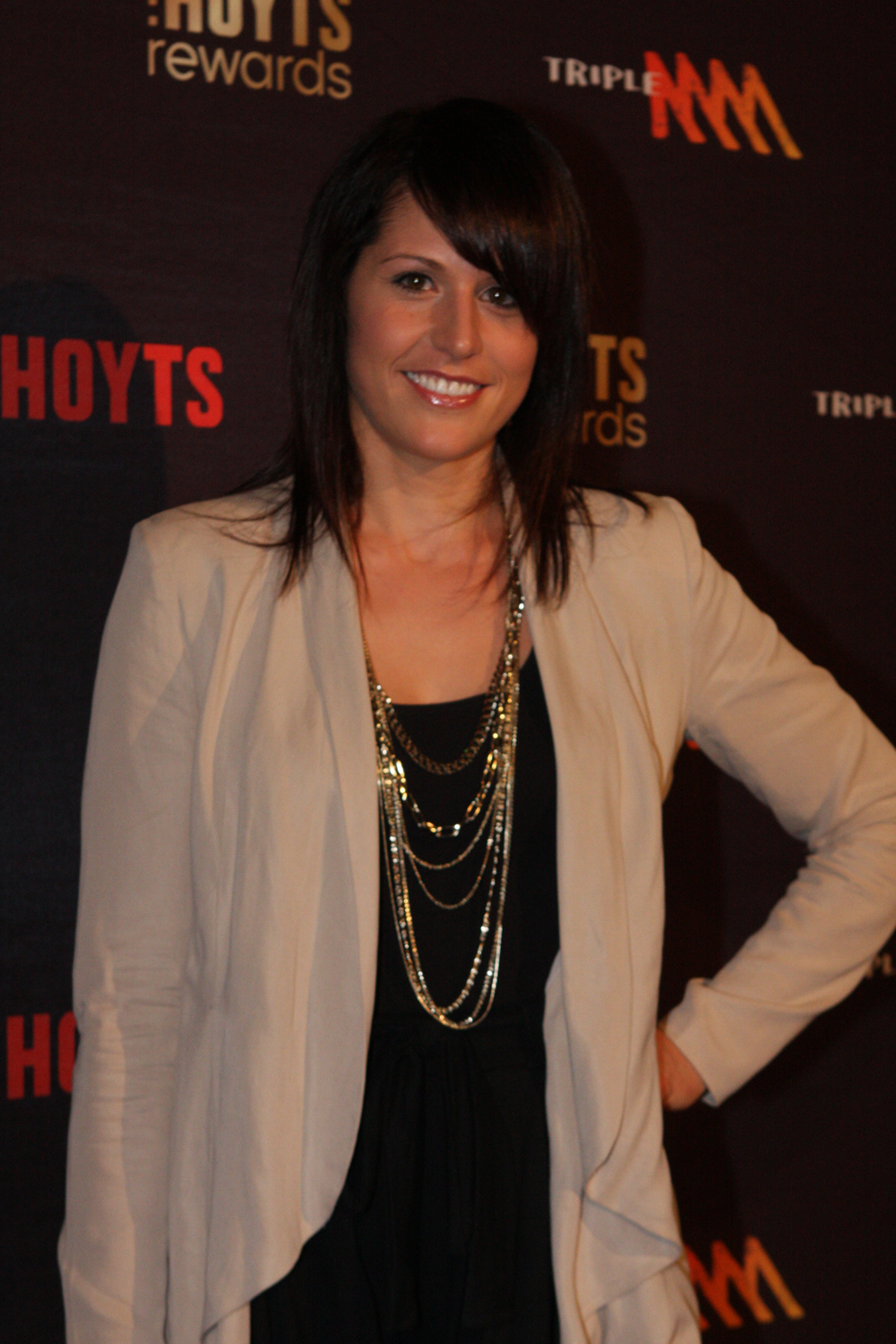
Rachel Corbett, Season 1

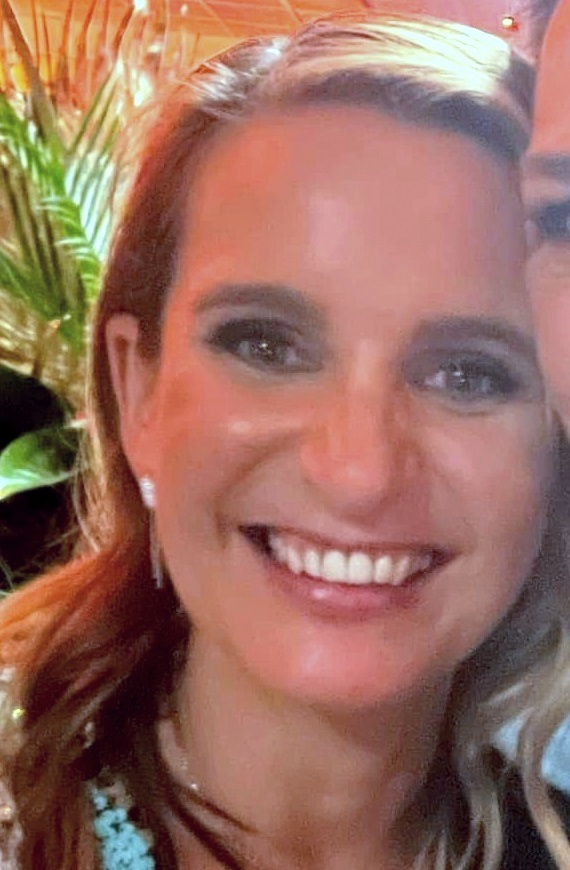
Regina Bird, Season 3 winner and Season 14 winner

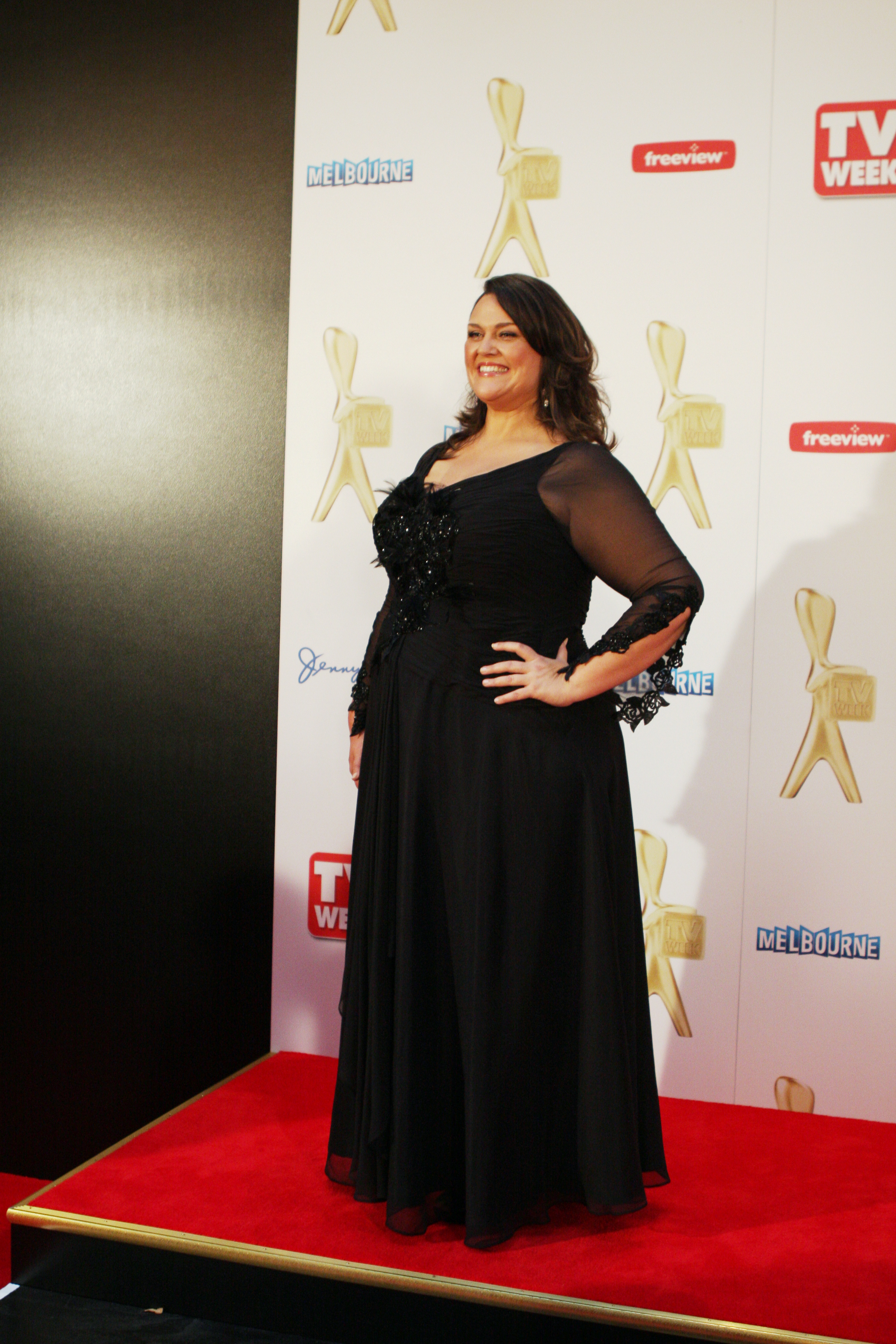
Chrissie Swan, Season 3 runner-up

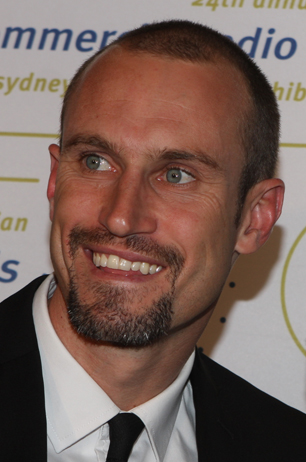
Ryan Fitzgerald, Season 4

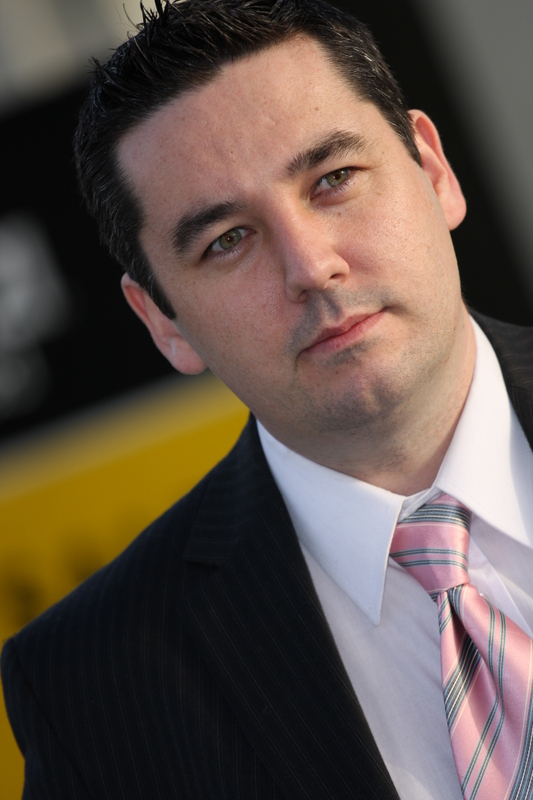
Jamie McDonald, Season 7

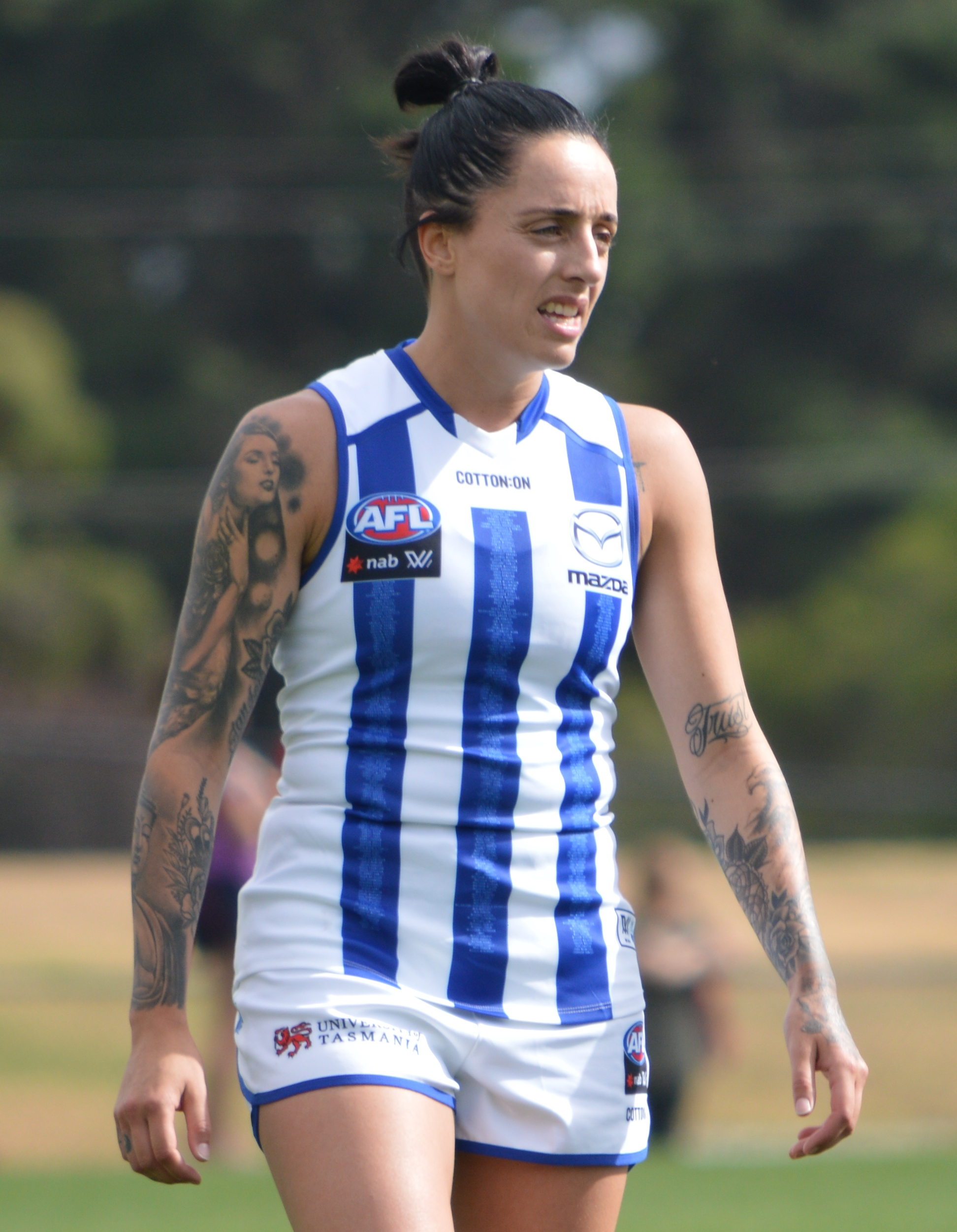
Jess Trend, Season 13

== Spin-off housemates ==
Key

Winner
Runner-up
Third place
Walked
Ejected
Housemate entered for the second time

=== Celebrity Big Brother housemates ===
| Series | Celebrity | Age | Notability | Status |
|---|---|---|---|---|
| 1 | Dylan Lewis | 29 | TV and radio personality | 1st – Winner |
| 1 | Jay Laga'aia | 38 | Actor | 2nd – Runner-up |
| 1 | Kyle Sandilands | 31 | TV and Radio personality | 3rd – Third place |
| 1 | Sara-Marie Fedele | 23 | Big Brother 1 housemate | 4th – Evicted |
| 1 | Gabby Millgate | 32 | Comedian | 5th – Evicted |
| 1 | Kimberley Cooper | 22 | Actress | 6th – Evicted |
| 1 | Adriana Xenides | 47 | TV Host | 7th – Evicted |
| 1 | Warwick Capper | 39 | Former AFL Star | 8th – Ejected |
| 1 | Imogen Bailey | 25 | Model | 9th – Evicted |
| 1 | Anthony Mundine | 27 | Boxer | 10th – Evicted |
| 1 | Vanessa Wagner | 37 | Gay community icon and drag-queen | 11th – Evicted |
| 1 | Red Symons | 53 | Musician, writer, and radio host | 12th – Walked |

=== Big Brother VIP housemates ===
| Series | VIP | Age | Notability | Status |
|---|---|---|---|---|
| 1 | Luke Toki | 34 | Australian Survivor contestant | 1st – Winner |
| 1 | Ellie Gonsalves | 31 | Model and actress | 2nd – Runner-up |
| 1 | Josh Carroll | 31 | Model | 2nd – Runner-up |
| 1 | Imogen Anthony | 30 | Model | 4th – Evicted |
| 1 | Jessika Power | 28 | Married at First Sight contestant | 5th – Evicted |
| 1 | Thomas Markle Jr. | 55 | Meghan Markle's brother | 6th – Evicted |
| 1 | Dayne Beams | 31 | Former AFL Player | 7th – Evicted |
| 1 | Bernard Curry | 47 | Actor | 8th – Evicted |
| 1 | Daniel "Danny" Hayes | 48 | Big Brother 13 housemate | 9th – Evicted |
| 1 | Caitlyn Jenner | 71 | Olympic gold medalist and media personality | 10th – Evicted |
| 1 | Matt Cooper | 42 | Former NRL player | 11th – Evicted |
| 1 | Omarosa Manigault | 47 | Reality TV star, author and former political aide | 12th – Evicted |

== Contestants competing in International versions ==
| Name | Big Brother Australia history | | Big Brother International history | | |
| Name | Series | Status | Country | Series | Status |
|---|---|---|---|---|---|
| Priya Malik | Big Brother 2014 | Evicted – 4th place | India | Bigg Boss 9 | Evicted – 6th place |
| Tim Dormer | Big Brother 2013 | Winner – 1st place | Canada | Big Brother Canada (season 4) | Evicted – 3rd place |
| Tim Dormer | Big Brother 2022 | Evicted – 5th place | Canada | Big Brother Canada (season 4) | Evicted – 3rd place |
| Omarosa Manigault | Big Brother VIP | Evicted – 12th place | United States | Celebrity Big Brother 1 | Evicted – 5th place |
