= Big Brother (Australian TV series) season 1 =

Season of television series

Big Brother
- Season 1
- Presented by: Gretel Killeen
- No. of days: 85
- No. of housemates: 14
- Winner: Ben Williams
- Runner-up: Blair McDonough
- Companion shows: Big Brother Saturday; Big Brother: Uncut
- No. of episodes: 95 (+ 4 specials)

Release
- Original network: Network Ten
- Original release: 24 April – 16 July 2001

Season chronology
- Next → Season 2

The first season of the Australian reality television series, Big Brother, retroactively known as Big Brother 2001, premiered on Network Ten on 24 April 2001 and lasted twelve weeks until the live finale on 16 July 2001. The show proved to be an early ratings success. In total, the season averaged 1.4 million viewers, thus making it the fourth highest rated season to date. This season aired for a total of 85 days, with evictions occurring once every week beginning with the second week. In total, fourteen Housemates competed in this season. The original twelve entered on the first night, with two intruders entering at a later date. Ultimately, housemate Ben Williams was later announced as the winner of the series, with Blair McDonough becoming the runner-up. The finale was watched by 2.789 million Australian viewers, making it the second most-watched television program of 2001 in the country.

The premise of the show remained largely unchanged from most other installments of the series. Big Brother revolves around a group of strangers living in a house together with no communication with the outside world. They are filmed constantly during their time in the house, and can have no communication with those filming them. Each week, each contestant, referred to as "Housemates", vote for two people to be nominated for Eviction. The three (or more) people with the most votes will be nominated to leave the house. The viewers then decide which of the nominees should leave, with the selected person leaving during a live show. This process continued until only three Housemates remained, in which the viewers would decide which of the Housemates would win the grand prize. A Housemate can be ejected from the show for breaking rules, such as discussing nominations when not permitted.

== Production ==
=== Broadcast ===
Shortly before the premiere of the season, a special entitled Big Brother Revealed aired, featuring information on the casting process and the development of the house. The series premiered on 24 April 2001, with the Housemates entering the day before. The contestants were recorded 24 hours a day with cameras fixed around the house, and had to wear portable microphones. Each night, Network Ten broadcast a daily highlights show, and from the second week there was a live eviction show hosted by Gretel Killeen, where the evicted Housemate was interviewed. The nominations aired during the daily highlights show during this season, making it the only season to not feature a live nominations special. This season also aired alongside the Big Brother Saturday spin-off series. This was an hour-long special that aired on Saturday evenings, with Gretel Killeen presenting an overview of press discussions of the series that week. The series also featured interviews with fans, which were conducted by reporter Sami Lukis. News about the previously evicted Housemates was also featured on this special. Big Brother Saturday was not featured in any subsequent seasons. The season concluded on 16 July 2001, lasting for a total of 85 days; this tied Big Brother 2001 and Big Brother 2008 as the shortest main editions of the Australian series until Big Brother 2014 and seasons beyond.

=== Prizes ===
The fourteen Housemates in the game were competing for the grand prize of $250,000. Each week, the Housemates attempted to complete various tasks assigned by Big Brother in exchange for a weekly budget, which they used to buy food and luxuries; this included buying things such as alcohol. This season, unlike later editions, did not feature luxury competitions or prizes throughout the series.

== House ==
The Big Brother House was located in a compound at Dreamworld. The House featured a total of 25 cameras and 32 microphones in the various rooms and backyard. The house for the first series was very basic, as part of the theme of the series. The House featured a living room, which had a fireplace for the Housemates to use, and a kitchen, which featured a stove and sink, along with the fridge. There was a large dining table in the kitchen, with room for all of the Housemates. Various two way mirrors are in the house, with a camera crew behind him. The House also featured two bedrooms, with each bedroom featuring six beds. The first bedroom had a double bed and featured blue walls and orange sheets. The bathroom featured blue tile flooring and a clear shower. Housemates could communicate with producers in the room known was the "Diary Room". The Diary Room in this season featured yellow walls and an orange chair, and had a simplistic design. This was where nominations took place, and where Housemates could reveal their thoughts. Housemates could be seen by a medical professional in the Diary Room if necessary. Furniture and homewares in the house were provided by Freedom Furniture. The outside of the House featured a chicken coop with various chickens inside, from which the Housemates collect eggs. The Housemates were also given a swimming pool in the backyard to use. There was also a garden in the backyard, which featured a vegetable patch which the Housemates could use.

== Format ==
The format used for Big Brother in Australia remained largely unchanged from that featured in other editions of the series, though some differences were incorporated. Big Brother is a game show in which a group of contestants, called Housemates, live in isolation from the outside world in a custom built "house", which includes everyday facilities such as a fully equipped kitchen, garden, two bedrooms, and a bathroom. The house is also a television studio with cameras and microphones in most of the rooms to record the activities of the Housemates. The only place where Housemates can escape the company of the other contestants is the Diary Room, where they are encouraged to voice their true feelings. Not all Diary Room footage is broadcast due to the privacy of the contestants. Each week all Housemates nominate two of their fellow contestants for potential eviction. They award two points to one Housemate, and one point to another. Failure to do so may result in a punishment, such as a reduction in the prize fund. The three, or more, Housemates with the highest number of nominations face a public vote conducted by phone, with the contestant receiving the most votes being evicted from the house. The last contestant remaining in the house is declared the winner and is awarded a cash prize of $250,000. On eviction night, host Gretel Killeen would inform the nominees which of them had been evicted from the house. Following the announcement, the evicted Housemate had to gather their belongings and exit the house. Upon exiting through the house's front door, Killeen led the evictee into a studio where they met with their family and friends. While in the studio, Killeen had an interview with the evicted Housemate, and showed their best bits – a video compilation of their time in the house.

Over the duration of the series, the Housemates were given a series of tasks by Big Brother which tested them in many ways. They were also put to the test by their own ideals, prejudices and opinions against other people from different walks of life. They lived in the communal House and shared cooking and cleaning chores amongst themselves. Housemates were forbidden to sleep during daylight hours (unless unwell) – Big Brother plays the wake-up call persistently in the morning if Housemates do not wake up and will play an alarm clock noise into the house if a Housemate falls asleep during the day. Housemates must also live by the fundamental rules of Big Brother; if the rules are broken it can result in formal warnings, various punishments or even a Housemate's removal from the game. They must wash their own clothes by hand, and they have to make their own bread from scratch. Each week Big Brother sets the Housemates a task in order to determine the shopping budget for the following week. They must work together to win the tasks in order to win a luxury shopping budget which changed based on the number of people remaining in the house. If all food runs out in the House, Big Brother provides emergency rations of chickpeas and rice. Housemates were responsible for their own shopping and decide which items the budget will allow them to have. Only a small percentage of the overall budget can be spent on alcohol.

This season featured some twists to the format throughout the course of the season. On Day 36, Housemates Anita and Rachel entered the house as intruders. Though they were official Housemates, they learned that they were automatically nominated for eviction. Their fellow Housemates then decided which of the two should be evicted from the house, and the Housemate with the most votes was then evicted. The survivor of the eviction was then given immunity from the following round of nominations. Yet another twist in the format occurred on Day 84, only a day before the season finale, when the Housemate who had come in third place was evicted from the house. The finale occurred on the final day, with only two of the three finalists remaining in the house. Weekly eviction shows often included live performances by musical guests. These segments formed part of the live broadcast alongside the eviction announcement and post-eviction interview, establishing an early format that combined reality television with light entertainment elements. Housemates were also permitted a greater range of personal comforts than in later seasons, including the ability to read books while in the house, a practice that was discontinued by the fourth season as the show adopted stricter rules and limitations.

== Housemates ==
Name	Age on entry	Hometown	Day entered	Day exited	Result
Ben Williams	21	Epping, New South Wales	1	85	Winner
Blair McDonough	19	Melbourne, Victoria	1	85	Runner-up
Sara-Marie Fedele	22	Western Australia	1	84	Evicted
Christina Davis	27	Sydney, New South Wales	1	77	Evicted
Jemma Gawned	26	Melbourne, Victoria	1	70	Evicted
John "Johnnie" Cass	30	Sydney, New South Wales	1	63	Evicted
Anita Bloomfield	22	Sydney, New South Wales	37	56	Evicted
Peter Timbs	28	Sydney, New South Wales	1	49	Evicted
Lisa Standing	24	Melbourne, Victoria	1	42	Evicted
Rachel Corbett	20	Sydney, New South Wales	37	40	Evicted
Gordon Sloan^{†}	28	Melbourne, Victoria	1	35	Evicted
Todd James	27	Melbourne, Victoria	1	28	Evicted
Sharna West	34	Melbourne, Victoria	1	21	Evicted
Andy Silva	25	Glebe, New South Wales	1	14	Evicted

=== Further Appearances ===
Sara-Marie returned to the Big Brother House as a Housemate on Celebrity Big Brother in 2002, she was also contestant on Dancing with the Stars in 2005 and appeared on the loved ones episode of Australian Celebrity Survivor as a friend of castaway and her Celebrity BB housemate, Imogen Bailey.

In 2010, Blair was a contestant on Dancing with the Stars.

== Episodes ==
No. overall	No. in season	Title	Day (Note: Denotes the real-time Day in the house at the time each episode aired. Note: In 2001, the first night was not considered Day 0 like it was in future seasons. See following note for additional information.)	Original release date	Network
Week 1
2	1	Premiere (Daily Show 1)	Day 2 (Note: It is typical for a Big Brother Launch episode to be pre-recorded 24-hours prior to broadcast. In 2001, this night was officially labelled Day 1 (despite it being considered Day 0 in every other season, except 2002). As a result, it was Day 2 (in real-time) by the time the series aired.)	24 April 2001	Ten
3	2	Daily Show 2 (Note: A ’Daily Show’ episode typically recaps events from the preceding Day(s) in the house. For example, an episode that aired on Day 3 generally covers the events from Day 2.)	Day 3	25 April 2001	Ten
4	3	Daily Show 3	Day 4	26 April 2001	Ten
5	4	Daily Show 4	Day 5	27 April 2001	Ten
6	5	Nominations	Day 7	29 April 2001	Ten
Week 2
7	6	Daily Show 5	Day 8	30 April 2001	Ten
8	7	Daily Show 6	Day 9	1 May 2001	Ten
9	8	Daily Show 7	Day 10	2 May 2001	Ten
10	9	Daily Show 8	Day 11	3 May 2001	Ten
11	10	Uncut 1	N/A	3 May 2001	Ten
12	11	Daily Show 9	Day 12	4 May 2001	Ten
13	12	Saturday Show 1	Day 13	5 May 2001	Ten
14	13	Daily Show 10 (Note: On the official YouTube channel, this ‘Daily Show’ has been spliced together with the first ‘Live Eviction’. As a result, it was not officially included in the overall ‘Daily Show’ count for 2001, however it originally aired as a separate episode with standalone opening/closing credits.)	Day 14	6 May 2001	Ten
15	14	Live (Eviction 1)	Day 14	6 May 2001	Ten
Week 3
16	15	Daily Show 11	Day 15	7 May 2001	Ten
17	16	Daily Show 12	Day 16	8 May 2001	Ten
18	17	Daily Show 13	Day 17	9 May 2001	Ten
19	18	Daily Show 14	Day 18	10 May 2001	Ten
20	19	Uncut 2	N/A	10 May 2001	Ten
21	20	Daily Show 15	Day 19	11 May 2001	Ten
22	21	Saturday Show 2	Day 20	12 May 2001	Ten
23	22	Live (Eviction 2)	Day 21	13 May 2001	Ten
Week 4
24	23	Daily Show 16	Day 22	14 May 2001	Ten
25	24	Daily Show 17	Day 23	15 May 2001	Ten
26	25	Daily Show 18	Day 24	16 May 2001	Ten
27	26	Daily Show 19	Day 25	17 May 2001	Ten
28	27	Uncut 3	N/A	17 May 2001	Ten
29	28	Daily Show 20	Day 26	18 May 2001	Ten
30	29	Saturday Show 3	Day 27	19 May 2001	Ten
31	30	Live (Eviction 3)	Day 28	20 May 2001	Ten
Week 5
32	31	Daily Show 21	Day 29	21 May 2001	Ten
33	32	Daily Show 22	Day 30	22 May 2001	Ten
34	33	Daily Show 23	Day 31	23 May 2001	Ten
35	34	Daily Show 24	Day 32	24 May 2001	Ten
36	35	Uncut 4	N/A	24 May 2001	Ten
37	36	Daily Show 25	Day 33	25 May 2001	Ten
38	37	Saturday Show 4	Day 34	26 May 2001	Ten
39	38	Live (Eviction 4)	Day 35	27 May 2001	Ten
Week 6
40	39	Daily Show 26	Day 36	28 May 2001	Ten
41	40	Daily Show 27	Day 37	29 May 2001	Ten
42	41	Daily Show 28	Day 38	30 May 2001	Ten
43	42	Daily Show 29	Day 39	31 May 2001	Ten
44	43	Uncut 5	N/A	31 May 2001	Ten
45	44	Daily Show 30 / Special Intruder Eviction (Note: On the official YouTube channel, the ‘Daily Show’ and ‘Special Intruder Eviction’ segments have been split into two videos. However, it was originally aired as a single episode.)	Day 40	1 June 2001	Ten
46	45	Saturday Show 5	Day 41	2 June 2001	Ten
47	46	Live (Eviction 5)	Day 42	3 June 2001	Ten
Week 7
48	47	Daily Show 31	Day 43	4 June 2001	Ten
49	48	Daily Show 32	Day 44	5 June 2001	Ten
50	49	Daily Show 33	Day 45	6 June 2001	Ten
51	50	Daily Show 34	Day 46	7 June 2001	Ten
52	51	Uncut 6	N/A	7 June 2001	Ten
53	52	Daily Show 35	Day 47	8 June 2001	Ten
54	53	Saturday Show 6	Day 48	9 June 2001	Ten
55	54	Live (Eviction 6)	Day 49	10 June 2001	Ten
Week 8
56	55	Daily Show 36	Day 50	11 June 2001	Ten
57	56	Daily Show 37	Day 51	12 June 2001	Ten
58	57	Daily Show 38	Day 52	13 June 2001	Ten
59	58	Daily Show 39	Day 53	14 June 2001	Ten
60	59	Uncut 7	N/A	14 June 2001	Ten
61	60	Daily Show 40	Day 54	15 June 2001	Ten
62	61	Saturday Show 7	Day 55	16 June 2001	Ten
63	62	Live (Eviction 7)	Day 56	17 June 2001	Ten
Week 9
64	63	Daily Show 41	Day 57	18 June 2001	Ten
65	64	Daily Show 42	Day 58	19 June 2001	Ten
66	65	Daily Show 43	Day 59	20 June 2001	Ten
67	66	Daily Show 44	Day 60	21 June 2001	Ten
68	67	Uncut 8	N/A	21 June 2001	Ten
69	68	Daily Show 45	Day 61	22 June 2001	Ten
70	69	Saturday Show 8	Day 62	23 June 2001	Ten
71	70	Live (Eviction 8)	Day 63	24 June 2001	Ten
Week 10
72	71	Daily Show 46	Day 64	25 June 2001	Ten
73	72	Daily Show 47	Day 65	26 June 2001	Ten
74	73	Daily Show 48	Day 66	27 June 2001	Ten
75	74	Daily Show 49	Day 67	28 June 2001	Ten
76	75	Uncut 9	N/A	28 June 2001	Ten
77	76	Daily Show 50	Day 68	29 June 2001	Ten
78	77	Saturday Show 9	Day 69	30 June 2001	Ten
79	78	Live (Eviction 9)	Day 70	1 July 2001	Ten
Week 11
80	79	Daily Show 51	Day 71	2 July 2001	Ten
81	80	Daily Show 52	Day 72	3 July 2001	Ten
82	81	Daily Show 53	Day 73	4 July 2001	Ten
83	82	Mastercard $100,000 Challenge	Day 73	4 July 2001	Ten
84	83	Daily Show 54	Day 74	5 July 2001	Ten
85	84	Uncut 10	N/A	5 July 2001	Ten
86	85	Daily Show 55	Day 75	6 July 2001	Ten
87	86	Saturday Show 10	Day 76	7 July 2001	Ten
88	87	Live (Eviction 10)	Day 77	8 July 2001	Ten
Week 12
89	88	Daily Show 56	Day 78	9 July 2001	Ten
90	89	Daily Show 57	Day 79	10 July 2001	Ten
91	90	Daily Show 58	Day 80	11 July 2001	Ten
92	91	Daily Show 59	Day 81	12 July 2001	Ten
93	92	Daily Show 60	Day 82	13 July 2001	Ten
94	93	Saturday Show 11	Day 83	14 July 2001	Ten
95	94	Live (Eviction 11)	Day 84	15 July 2001	Ten
Week 13
96	95	The Final Eviction (Live Finale)	Day 85	16 July 2001	Ten

=== Specials ===
No. overall	No. in season	Title	Original release date
N/A	N/A	Big Brother Is Coming	2 December 2000
An early pre-series special that aired in 2000, focussing on the concept of Big Brother overseas. It showcased international versions of the show, such as Big Brother UK and the original Dutch series. It also explained the rules of the show and detailed how Australians could apply to become a contestant. This special is not considered part of the official episode count for Big Brother Australia.
1	N/A	Big Brother Revealed	11 April 2001
A special that aired shortly before the first season, introducing Australia to the concept of Big Brother. The special featured information about the casting process, as well as details about the development of the house and auditorium at Dreamworld. It was narrated by Gretel Killeen.
97	N/A	Big Brother Wrap Party	16 July 2001
Following the broadcast of the 2001 finale, footage from the after-party at Conrad Jupiters was shown. The housemates were also interviewed by Sami Lukis.
98	N/A	Evicted: Life in the Real World	22 July 2001
The housemates share their experiences after being evicted from the show and discuss the impact Big Brother had on their lives. It was hosted by Gretel Killeen.
99	N/A	Big Brother Secrets	29 July 2001
A one-hour special (originally titled ‘Big Brother Revisited’) that took viewers behind-the-scenes to unlock secrets from the house, the Housemates and featured unseen footage from the first season. It was hosted by Gretel Killeen.

== Nominations table ==
Color key:

Winner
Runner-up
Nominated
Exempt
No Nominations
Intruder Vote
Evicted

	Week 2	Week 3	Week 4	Week 5	Week 6		Week 7	Week 8	Week 9	Week 10	Week 11	Week 12		Nomination points received
	Week 2	Week 3	Week 4	Week 5	Nominations	Intruder Eviction	Week 7	Week 8	Week 9	Week 10	Week 11	Day 84	Finale	Nomination points received
Ben	2–Gordon, 1–Sara-Marie	2–Peter, 1–Sharna	2–Gordon, 1–Christina	2–Gordon, 1–Peter	2–Lisa, 1–Sara-Marie	Anita	2–Peter, 1–Sara-Marie	2–Anita, 1–Sara-Marie	2–Sara-Marie, 1–Johnnie	2–Christina, 1–Sara-Marie	2–Sara-Marie; 1–Christina	No nominations	Winner (Day 85)	22
Blair	2–Andy, 1–Gordon	2–Sharna, 1–Peter	2–Gordon, 1–Sara-Marie	2–Gordon, 1–Lisa	2–Christina, 1–Lisa	Anita	2–Christina, 1–Peter	2–Anita, 1–Christina	2–Christina, 1–Jemma	2–Jemma, 1–Christina	2–Christina, 1–Sara-Marie	No nominations	Runner-up (Day 85)	14
Sara-Marie	2–Sharna, 1–Gordon	2–Sharna, 1–Todd	2–Jemma, 1–Todd	2–Jemma, 1–Peter	2–Blair, 1–Ben	Rachel	2–Johnnie, 1–Peter	2–Jemma, 1–Ben	2–Johnnie, 1–Jemma	2–Blair, 1–Ben	2–Ben, 1–Blair	No nominations	Evicted (Day 84)	35
Christina	2–Ben, 1–Lisa	2–Todd, 1–Gordon	2–Lisa, 1–Jemma	2–Lisa, 1–Johnnie	2–Johnnie, 1–Jemma	Anita	2–Blair, 1–Ben	2–Johnnie, 1–Jemma	2–Ben, 1–Johnnie	2–Jemma, 1–Ben	2–Ben, 1–Blair	Evicted (Day 77)		32
Jemma	2–Andy, 1–Sara-Marie	2–Gordon, 1–Christina	2–Gordon, 1–Sara-Marie	2–Gordon, 1–Peter	2–Sara-Marie, 1–Blair	Rachel	2–Sara-Marie, 1–Peter	2–Anita, 1–Sara-Marie	Banned	2–Christina, Blair	Evicted (Day 70)			21
Johnnie	2–Jemma, 1–Andy	2–Sharna, 1–Christina	2–Gordon, 1–Todd	2–Sara-Marie, 1–Gordon	2–Jemma, 1–Ben	Rachel	2–Christina, 1–Sara-Marie	2–Christina, 1–Anita	2–Ben, 1–Sara-Marie	Evicted (Day 63)				11
Anita	Not in House					Nominated	Exempt	2–Blair, 1–Ben	Evicted (Day 56)					7
Peter	2–Gordon, 1–Andy	2–Todd, 1–Gordon	2–Todd, 1–Gordon	2–Lisa, 1–Gordon	2–Sara-Marie, 1–Lisa	Rachel	2–Jemma, 1–Sara-Marie	Evicted (Day 49)						16
Lisa	2–Christina, 1–Andy	2–Christina, 1–Peter	2–Gordon, 1–Peter	2–Christina, 1–Blair	2–Christina, 1–Blair	Rachel	Evicted (Day 42)							16
Rachel	Not in House					Nominated	Evicted (Day 40)							N/A
Gordon	2–Sara-Marie, 1–Ben	2–Peter, 1–Ben	2–Ben, 1–Peter	2–Lisa, 1–Ben	Evicted (Day 35)									29
Todd	2–Sara-Marie, 1–Andy	2–Sara-Marie, 1–Sharna	2–Sara-Marie, 1–Lisa	Evicted (Day 28)										9
Sharna	2–Andy, 1–Sara-Marie	2–Christina, 1–Sara-Marie	Evicted (Day 21)											12
Andy	2–Sharna, 1–Lisa	Evicted (Day 14)												10
Note	none					1	2	none	3	none		4	5	
Nominated	Andy, Gordon, Sara-Marie	Christina, Peter, Sharna	Gordon, Sara-Marie, Todd	Gordon, Lisa, Peter	Blair, Christina, Lisa, Sara-Marie	Anita, Rachel	Christina, Peter, Sara-Marie	Anita, Christina, Jemma	Ben, Johnnie, Sara-Marie	Blair, Christina, Jemma	Ben, Christina, Sara-Marie	Ben, Blair, Sara-Marie	Ben, Blair	
Evicted	Andy; 44% to evict	Sharna; 76% to evict	Todd; 38% to evict	Gordon; 41% to evict	Lisa; 50% to evict	Rachel; 5 of 8 votes to evict	Peter; 42% to evict	Anita; 79% to evict	Johnnie; 70% to evict	Jemma; 61% to evict	Christina; 41% to evict	Sara-Marie; 37% to evict	Blair; 62% to evict	
Saved	Sara-Marie; 40% Gordon; 16%	Christina; 14% Peter; 10%	Gordon; 32% Sara-Marie; 30%	Lisa; 39% Peter; 20%	Christina; 21% Sara-Marie; 21% Blair; 8%	Anita; 3 of 8 votes	Sara-Marie; 30% Christina; 28%	Jemma; 15% Christina; 6%	Ben; 15% Sara-Marie; 15%	Christina; 26% Blair; 13%	Ben; 31% Sara-Marie; 28%	Ben; 36% Blair; 27%	Ben; 38% to evict	

=== Notes ===
- ^Note 1: On Day 37, Intruders Anita and Rachel entered the house. On Day 40, the Intruders faced a House Eviction vote. As Rachel received the majority of the votes, she was evicted from the house.
- ^Note 2: Due to surviving the Intruder Eviction, Anita could not nominate or be nominated.
- ^Note 3: Jemma lost her voting privileges as a result of rule breaches regarding the discussion of Nominations.
- ^Note 4: There were no Nominations in Week 12. The final three housemates automatically faced Australia's Vote.
- ^Note 5: For the finale, Australia voted to evict between the final two housemates. The winner of Big Brother Australia 2001 and the $250,000 grand prize would be the finalist with the fewest votes to evict.

== Other specials ==
Due to the popularity and success of the series, the housemates also featured on a number of other television programmes in the months after the show concluded.

=== Big Brother's Beauties and the Beast ===
This is a special episode of the panel talk show Beauty and the Beast that aired on July 19 2001, featuring Housemates from the first season of Big Brother.

=== Sale of the Century: The Housemates Final Test ===
A special week of episodes of the game show Sale Of The Century aired from July 30 2001 on Nine Network, featuring contestants from the first season of Big Brother. Contestants competed to amass the highest score by answering questions correctly. The winner from each episode returned at the end of the week as a carry-over champion in order to win the grand prize. Contestants included former Housemates: Sharna West, Todd James, Andy Silva, Rachel Corbett, Gordan Sloan, Lisa Standing, Johnnie Cass, Anita Bloomfield, Ben Williams, Jemma Gawned, Blair McDonough, Christina Davis and Peter Timbs, with a guest appearance by Sara-Marie Fedele.

=== The Weakest Link: Housemates' Revenge ===
On 27 August 2001, a special episode of the Seven Network game show The Weakest Link aired, also featuring contestants from the first season. Contestants answered general knowledge questions and voted to eliminate each other as they competed for a cash prize. Contestants included former Housemates: Ben Williams, Rachel Corbett, Andy Silva, Todd James, Johnnie Cass, Jemma Gawned, Sharna West, Anita Bloomfield and Gordan Sloan. The results were as follows:

	Main Rounds								Final Round
Round:	1	2	3	4	5	6	7	8	Final
Voted Out:	Ben; 7/9 Votes	Rachel; 3/8 votes	Andy; 4/7 Votes	Todd^{1} 2/6 Votes	Johnnie^{2} 2/5 Votes	Jemma; 3/4 Votes	Sharna; 2/3 Votes	–	Gordon (Winner); Anita (Runner-up)
Money Banked:	$10,000	$3,000	$7,000	$2,500	$3,000	$3,000	$2,500	$200 x 3	$31,600; TOTAL
Contestant	Votes								
Gordon	Ben	Jemma	Johnnie	Johnnie	Johnnie	Jemma	Sharna	Won	
Anita	Ben	Rachel	Andy	Sharna	Sharna	Jemma	Sharna	Lost	
Sharna	Ben	Andy	Andy	Todd	Johnnie	Jemma	Anita		
Jemma	Sharna	Rachel	Andy	Johnnie	~~Gordon~~; Johnnie^{2}	Anita			
Johnnie	Ben	Rachel	Andy	Todd	Sharna				
Todd	Ben	Johnnie	Sharna	Sharna					
Andy	Ben	Sharna	Johnnie						
Rachel	Ben	Johnnie							
Ben	Gordon								

- Note that the following are regarding the contestant, not the contestant the contestant votes against:

Red indicates the contestant was the weakest link
Lime indicates the contestant was the strongest link

^{1} Todd, Sharna and Anita tied with two votes each, but as Sharna was the strongest link, and could not vote herself off, she opted to vote Todd off.

^{2} Johnnie and Sharna tied with two votes each, but as Jemma was the strongest link, she opted to vote Johnnie off, though she originally voted for Gordon who was not part of the tie.

Ben was first eliminated for being too greedy. Rachel was next for not answering any questions correctly. Andy followed for not answering enough questions correctly. Todd was voted out on a countback also for not answering any questions correctly. Johnnie was eliminated on a countback for not banking any money nor answering enough questions correctly. Jemma was voted out for being too big a threat to the team. Sharna was voted out also for being too big of a threat to the team. In the end, Gordon defeated Anita in the head-to-head round.

The final total won was $31,600.

=== Big Brother's Starlight Challenge ===
A special fundraising telethon for the Starlight Children's Foundation aired on Ten on October 3 2001. All Housemates from the first season returned to perform a spectacular pantomime, narrated by Tim Ferguson. Gretel Killeen also made a guest appearance during the special. It was filmed live at the Star City Casino in front of an audience, with many celebrities in attendance to help raise funds for the charity. It was hosted by Bert Newton and Rove McManus.

== Controversies ==
When Big Brother Australia premiered in 2001, it was among the first reality television programs in Australia to depict nudity and suggestive behaviour. Although such content was typically broadcast in late-night segments and carried an MA15+ classification, its presence on mainstream television was considered controversial by some viewers. A "bondage" party caused concerns when housemate Andrea Silva, a dominatrix in profession, displayed some of her sexual fetishes to the other housemates, where she tied up her shirtless male housemates, pinched their nipples and lashed them with a scourge. Big Brother Uncut received backlash for airing footage of Peter Timbs and Christina Davis appearing to simulate sex under the bedsheets, although the pair later stated that they had not engaged in sexual intercourse despite making rhythmic sexual movements.

Contestant Johnnie Cass was among the first openly gay participants on Australian reality television. During the series, he was portrayed as a “villain,” and was labelled “Johnnie Rotten” by sections of the media, a characterisation shaped through editing and narrative framing. Cass later stated that this depiction led to significant public backlash and had a negative impact on his mental health, noting that it contributed to the emergence of personal doubts and to difficulties he experienced following his appearance on the program. When footage of him striking his head while diving into a pool was broadcast, the studio audience reportedly responded with applause. Cass later considered legal action against the Ten Network over his portrayal.

== Popular culture ==
- "The Housemates Song (Don’t You Think That’s Strange)" was a track performed by the housemates and featured on the program’s accompanying album, released by BMG Australia Limited.
- Peter Timbs and Christina Davis’s “dancing doona” moment became widely referenced in Australian popular culture, with the pair’s suggestive under-the-bedcovers footage gaining notoriety and becoming a recurring talking point in media discussions of the series.
- Sara-Marie Fedele became widely recognised in Australian popular culture for her “bum dance,” a playful dance routine she frequently performed during the series. The routine gained significant public attention during the show’s broadcast and contributed to her emergence as one of the season’s most memorable and talked-about housemates, with the moment becoming a notable element of early Australian reality television fandom. Following her appearance on the show, she released a novelty single titled “I'm So Excited (The Bum Dance)”, which reached the ARIA Top 20, further cementing the dance as a recognised media and pop culture moment associated with the program.
- In September 2007, Gordon Sloan's death received national media coverage in Australia following his collapse in Beijing and subsequent death at the age of 34. The circumstances surrounding his death remained unclear and subject to speculation. Following his death, tributes were paid by former housemates, including the series winner, who publicly expressed their condolences. Unconfirmed reports suggested Sloan may have died from a heroin overdose; however, his family denied this and suggested he may have been drugged. A police investigation was later abandoned due to a lack of evidence. Sloan was laid to rest at a private Sydney funeral attended by around 150 mourners, including his ex-girlfriend Natalie Bassingthwaighte and Big Brother host Gretel Killeen.
- In 2021, Anita Bloomfield gained viral attention after posting a TikTok video demonstrating a tool-free dishwasher “rack hack” that allows the upper rack to be raised, creating extra space for large plates. The video received widespread engagement online, accumulating hundreds of thousands of views and prompting discussion about the commonly overlooked adjustable feature in dishwashers.

== Track listing ==
Big Brother: The Album (2001)
No.	Title	Artist	Length
1.	"Big Brother Theme"	001 Productions	3:26
2.	"Broken Bones (City of Love Radio Mix)"	Love Inc.	4:02
3.	"Feel the Beat (Radio Edit)"	Darude	3:19
4.	"Real to Me (Barcelona Mix)"	Lydia Denker	3:27
5.	"The Final (Radio Flight)"	Phil Fuldner	3:39
6.	"Dirt (Slayer Edit)"	Death in Vegas	3:52
7.	"Scorchio (Radio Edit)"	Sasha and Darren Emerson	3:35
8.	"The Contender (Mac Mix/Radio Edit)"	The Mark of Cain	4:50
9.	"The Fall"	Way Out West	3:39
10.	"Come Together"	Spiritualized	4:44
11.	"Comin' Down (Players Remix)"	Bleachin'	5:26
12.	"Touch Me (Radio Edit)"	Rui da Silva	3:26
13.	"Darling"	Sheila Bonino	4:01
14.	"The Future of the Future (Stay Gold) (David Morales Radio Edit)"	Deep Dish feat. Everything But The Girl	3:52
15.	"Give a Little Love (Happy Robot Mix)"	Sirens	3:59
16.	"Tast-e (Vocal Mix – Radio Edit)"	Paul Dakeyne and Andy Gray	3:20
17.	"The Housemates Song (Don't You Think That's Strange) (Original Raw Mix)"	Big Brother Housemates / 001 Productions	4:21

Big Brother: The Single
No.	Title	Length
1.	"Big Brother Theme"	3:25
2.	"B.B. Uncut Mix"	3:55
3.	"The Diary Room Mix"	5:44

== Bibliography ==
- Johnson-woods, Toni (2002). Big Brother: Why Did That Reality TV Show Become Such a Phenomenon?. Australia: University of Queensland Press. p. 256. ISBN 0-7022-3315-3.
