= Celebrity Big Brother (Australian TV series) =

- Presented by: Gretel Killeen
- No. of days: 24
- No. of housemates: 12
- Winner: Dylan Lewis
- Runner-up: Jay Laga'aia
- No. of episodes: 20

Release
- Original network: Network 10
- Original release: 21 July – 12 August 2002

Series chronology
- Next → Big Brother VIP

Celebrity Big Brother was a celebrity edition of Big Brother. It lasted for 24 days, starting on 21 July 2002 and ending on 12 August 2002. A proportion of the profits from Eviction votes went to charities. This was the only series of Celebrity Big Brother that was made as a part of the Big Brother Australia format. This series used the same house from Big Brother 2, which itself used the house from Big Brother 1, but slightly remodeled. The bathroom was off limits to the cameras. No further celebrity editions were commissioned on Network 10 before the entire franchise was axed by the network in 2008. Big Brother was rebooted on the Nine Network from 2012 to 2014. Following the conclusion of the 2014 civilian season, rumours had begun circulating that Nine were looking at reviving the Celebrity Big Brother edition of the show for broadcast in 2015 which were later confirmed by host Sonia Kruger. However, By July 2015, The Celebrity Apprentice Australia had replaced the proposed Celebrity Big Brother revival. A third revival of the show by Seven Network saw the second celebrity instalment of the series, titled Big Brother VIP.

Several guest celebrities appeared briefly in the series on only a temporary basis without becoming a housemate. These included Carla Bonner (Neighbours actress) and Bert Newton. Warwick Capper was ejected from the house for flashing his penis at Kimberley Cooper during an argument.

== Housemates ==
Housemate	Occupation	Entered	Exited	Status	Refs
Dylan Lewis	Television & radio presenter	Day 1	Day 24	Winner	
Jay Laga'aia	Water Rats actor	Day 16	Day 24	Runner-up	
Kyle Sandilands	2Day FM radio presenter	Day 1	Day 23	Evicted	
Sara-Marie Fedele	Big Brother 2001 housemate	Day 1	Day 20	Evicted	
Gabby Millgate	Comedian	Day 9	Day 18	Evicted	
Kimberley Cooper	Former Home and Away actress	Day 1	Day 16	Evicted	
Adriana Xenides†	Former Wheel of Fortune presenter	Day 1	Day 13	Evicted	
Warwick Capper	Former AFL player	Day 11	Day 13	Ejected	
Imogen Bailey	Model & singer	Day 1	Day 11	Evicted	
Anthony Mundine	Professional boxer	Day 1	Day 9	Evicted	
Vanessa Wagner	Drag-queen	Day 1	Day 9	Evicted	
Red Symons	Musician, writer, & radio presenter	Day 7	Day 8	Walked	

== Episodes ==
No. overall	No. in season	Title	Day (Note: Denotes the real-time Day in the house at the time each episode aired. Note: In 2002, the first night was not considered Day 0 like it was in future seasons.)	Original release date
Week 1
201	1	Opening Night	Day 2 (Note: It is typical for a Big Brother Launch episode to be pre-recorded 24-hours prior to broadcast. In 2002, this night was officially labelled Day 1 (despite it being considered Day 0 in most other seasons). As a result, it was Day 2 (in real-time) by the time the series aired.)	21 July 2002
202	2	Daily Show 1	Day 3	22 July 2002
203	3	Live (McDonald’s $10,000 Challenge)	Day 4	23 July 2002
204	4	Daily Show 2	Day 5	24 July 2002
205	5	Live (Nominations 1)	Day 6	25 July 2002
206	6	Daily Show 3	Day 7	26 July 2002
Week 2
207	7	Live (Eviction 1 & Nominations 2)	Day 9	28 July 2002
208	8	Daily Show 4	Day 10	29 July 2002
209	9	Live (Eviction 2 & Nominations 3)	Day 11	30 July 2002
210	10	Daily Show 5	Day 12	31 July 2002
211	11	Live (Eviction 3 & Nominations 4)	Day 13	1 August 2002
212	12	Daily Show 6	Day 14	2 August 2002
Week 3
213	13	Live (Eviction 4 & Nominations 5)	Day 16	4 August 2002
214	14	Daily Show 7	Day 17	5 August 2002
215	15	Live (Eviction 5 & Nominations 6)	Day 18	6 August 2002
216	16	Daily Show 8	Day 19	7 August 2002
217	17	Up Late (Note: This special episode, titled ‘Up Late’, is not related to the Big Brother Australia companion show with the same name.) Live (Eviction 6)	Day 20	8 August 2002
218	18	Daily Show 9	Day 21	9 August 2002
Week 4
219	19	Live (Eviction 7)	Day 23	11 August 2002
220	20	The Final Curtain (Live Finale)	Day 24	12 August 2002

== Nominations table ==
The first housemate in each box was nominated for two points, and the second housemate was nominated for one point.

	Day 6	Day 9	Day 11	Day 13	Day 16	Day 18	Day 20	Day 24 Finale	Nomination points received
Dylan	Anthony, Kyle	Adriana, Kimberley	Adriana, Kimberley	Gabby, Sara-Marie	Gabby, Kyle	Jay, Kyle	No; Nominations	Winner (Day 24)	1
Jay	Not in House				Exempt	Sara-Marie, Kyle	No; Nominations	Runner-Up (Day 24)	6
Kyle	Vanessa, Anthony	Adriana, Kimberley	Adriana, Gabby	Sara-Marie, Kimberley	Gabby, Sara-Marie	Jay, Sara-Marie	No; Nominations	Evicted (Day 23)	12
Sara-Marie	Adriana, Imogen	Imogen, Adriana	Adriana, Dylan	Gabby, Kyle	Gabby, Kyle	Jay, Kyle	Evicted (Day 20)		12
Gabby	Not in House	Exempt	Kimberley, Adriana	Kimberley, Sara-Marie	Kyle, Sara-Marie	Evicted (Day 18)			16
Kimberley	Anthony, Vanessa	Imogen, Adriana	Adriana, Gabby	Gabby, Kyle	Evicted (Day 16)				18
Adriana	Sara-Marie, Anthony	Kimberley, Sara-Marie	Gabby, Kyle	Evicted (Day 13)					18
Warwick	Not in House			Ejected (Day 13)					0
Imogen	Kimberley, Anthony	Kimberley, Adriana	Evicted (Day 11)						6
Anthony	Kimberley, Imogen	Evicted (Day 9)							7
Vanessa	Kimberley, Kyle	Evicted (Day 9)							3
Red	Not in House	Walked (Day 8)							0
Nominated	Anthony, Kimberley, Vanessa	Adriana, Imogen, Kimberley	Adriana, Gabby, Kimberley	Gabby, Kimberley, Sara-Marie	Gabby, Kyle, Sara-Marie	Jay, Kyle, Sara-Marie	Dylan, Jay, Kyle	Dylan, Jay	
Walked	Red	none							
Ejected	none		Warwick	none					
Evicted	Vanessa; Most votes to evict	Imogen; Most votes to evict	Adriana; Most votes to evict	Kimberley; Most votes to evict	Gabby; Most votes to evict	Sara-Marie; Most votes to evict	Kyle; Most votes to evict	Jay; Most votes to evict	
Evicted	Anthony; Most votes to evict	Imogen; Most votes to evict	Adriana; Most votes to evict	Kimberley; Most votes to evict	Gabby; Most votes to evict	Sara-Marie; Most votes to evict	Kyle; Most votes to evict	Dylan; Fewest votes to evict	

== Summary ==
Daily Summary of Events
Day 1	Entrances	Adriana, Dylan, Kimberley, Vanessa, Kyle, Imogen, Anthony and Sara-Marie entered the House.
Day 2	Tasks	The Housemates looked after two baby goats visiting the House.; The Housemates had to compose a song. Each Housemate that participated received double their daily shopping allowance.
Day 3	Tasks	The Housemates played cowboy-themed games to win $10,000 for the charities. Lee Kernaghan, Gretel Killeen and Marty from the second season visited to host the games.
Day 4	General	The Housemates were woken up by The Wiggles, who sang some of their songs.
Day 4	Tasks	The baby goats left the Big Brother House.
Day 5	Tasks	The Housemates composed a children's song, as part of a Task left by The Wiggles
Day 5	Nominations	The Housemates nominated for the first time. The order in which the housemates nominated was revealed by Gretel.
Day 6	General	The Housemates were woken up by Mikey Robins, broadcasting live from the House for Triple M in Sydney.; The Housemates had a medieval-themed feast.
Day 7	Entrances	Red entered the House.
Day 7	General	Red appraised paintings made by the Housemates about each other.
Day 8	Exits	Red voluntarily left the House via a hole he created in the wall.
Day 9	Tasks	The Housemates participated in the "Common Games", a version of the Commonwealth Games with simpler games.
Day 9	Exits	Vanessa and Anthony were evicted from the House.
Day 9	Nominations	Fresh from the first eviction, the Housemates nominated for the second round. The order of nominations was decided by Sara-Marie's rocks.
Day 9	Entrances	Gabby entered the House.
Day 10	Tasks	The Housemates were woken by the 2Day FM breakfast team to play Battle of the Sexes for charity.
Day 11	General	Bert Newton visited the House.; Peter Helliar visited the House.
Day 11	Exits	Imogen was evicted from the House.
Day 11	Nominations	The third round of nominations were conducted. The order of nominations was decided by Dylan and a teddy bear.
Day 11	Entrances	Warwick entered the House.
Day 12	Tasks	The "Common Games" continue, with Housemates kicking Australian rules football goals, attempting to score 100 points from 4 attempts each.
Day 12	General	Iain Hewitson visited the House to cook a meal for the Housemates.
Day 13	General	Anthony and Vanessa returned to the House. Anthony challenged Sara-Marie to a rematch of basketball shootout. Sydney Kings captain Shane Heal acted as referee.
Day 13	Exits	Warwick was removed from the House for inappropriate behaviour towards the female Housemates.; Adriana was evicted from the House.
Day 13	Nominations	The fourth round of nominations were conducted. The nominations order was decided by popping balloons with numbers inside them.
Day 14	Entrances	Carla entered the House.
Day 15	General	Magician Robert Gallup visited the House to perform for the Housemates. His final trick was to make Carla disappear (leave the House) and Jess from the second season to appear.; Jess picked playing cards at random to determine the next order of nominations.
Day 16	Tasks	The Housemates make outfits and perform in a fashion parade.
Day 16	Exits	Kimberley was evicted from the House
Day 16	Nominations	The fifth round of nominations was conducted, using the order decided by Jess the previous night.
Day 16	Entrances	Jay entered the House.
Day 17	Tasks	The Housemates created three-dimensional clay objects.; The Housemates took photos with a supplied mobile phone and sent them to Rove Live.
Day 18	Exits	Gabby was evicted from the House.
Day 18	Nominations	The sixth and final round of nominations were conducted. The nominations order was decided by picking numbered balls at random from a tub of lather.
Day 18	General	Sara-Marie and Kyle trashed the lounge room, which upset Dylan.
Day 19	General	Dylan started making more mess in the house, so Sara-Marie decided to tell him that it was her and Kyle who made the original mess.
Day 20	Tasks	Ten News weatherman Tim Bailey visited the House to present the "Pash for Cash" challenge. Sara-Marie was asked to kiss Tim to win $7,000 for the charities.
Day 20	Exits	Sara-Marie was evicted.
Day 21	Tasks	The Housemates are given a video camera to create a short film. Instead they use it to film their escape on to the roof of the House.
Day 23	Exits	Kyle is evicted from the House.
Day 24	Exits	Jay was evicted from the House, leaving Dylan in the House as the winner.
