= Sara-Marie Fedele =

Australian television reality show contestant

- Born: 18 August 1978 (age 48); Perth, Western Australia, Australia
- Occupations: Model, former television reality show contestant
- Known for: Big Brother Australia

Sara-Marie Fedele (born 18 August 1978) is an Australian television personality, entrepreneur, author and model. She first appeared as a contestant on the reality television series Big Brother Australia 2001. Fedele became known for her signature “bum dance” and, following the show, released a cover of “I'm So Excited”, authored children’s books, and launched a successful line of pyjamas, in addition to being a plus-size model. She emerged as one of the earliest breakout figures of Australian reality television.

== Career ==
=== Big Brother ===
On Big Brother, Fedele became known for the "bum dance" she performed while in the House, as well as for her bunny ears headband, chubby physique and for being one of the more outspoken and flamboyant housemates of the series. She entered the Big Brother Australia (2001) house as an unknown 22-year-old strip club manager from Western Australia and left to widespread public recognition, with large crowds of fans imitating her on-screen style, including pyjamas and bunny ears, and performing her signature “bum dance.” She was evicted on 15 July 2001, after making it to the final 3, and finished her stay in the house in 3rd place. Due to her loud nature in the house, she was nominated for eviction six times previously.

=== Post-Big Brother ===
Fedele released a humour book The Sara-Marie Guide To Life, a CD single (a cover of "I'm So Excited", titled "I'm So Excited (The Bum Dance)" – with The Sirens), and a line of sleepwear after leaving the Big Brother House. Fedele later became a best-selling author with the book she released. She was a housemate on Australian Celebrity Big Brother in 2002, and later a presenter on children's television series, Totally Wild. Her celebrity subsequently cooled and she took a retail job in Sydney. Following her initial fame, she briefly operated an online business selling personalised grains of rice. She was a contestant in series two of Dancing with the Stars in early 2005. She was featured in the TV series Body Work and also appeared in television advertisements in 2005.

On the Big Brother website, during the sixth season, there was a poll asking Big Brother fans who their favourite Big Brother Housemate of all time was. Fedele came first. Following her appearance on Big Brother Australia, Sara-Marie Fedele declined opportunities to make paid nightclub appearances, a common practice among former housemates. Fedele also made an appearance on John Safran vs God, where she was featured in a focus group to do with the Israeli–Palestinian conflict. In 2006, she appeared on an episode of Australia's Celebrity Survivor as a friend of contestant Imogen Bailey, who had been a fellow contestant of Fedele's on the first series of Celebrity Big Brother.In 2008, she appeared as a panelist on Big Mouth, Big Brother's weekly panel show.

After working in retail and childcare, Fedele became a plus-sized model for BGM in Sydney in 2010. She returned to working in childcare and retail, before returning to her hometown of Bunbury, where she is currently studying to be a teacher's aide for special needs children. In subsequent media appearances, including on Sunrise in 2023 and Studio 10 in 2018, Fedele reflected on her time on Big Brother Australia (2001) and her later life. She described how elements of her on-screen persona contributed to her popularity, while also noting the challenges of adjusting to public attention and performing before large audiences. She made occasional television appearances during the 2010s, including on the ABC program You Can't Ask That in 2018. Fedele has also spoken about the difficulties she experienced after the show, including feelings of isolation and negative interactions with members of the public, despite periods of commercial success and media opportunities. As her daughter has grown older, Fedele has indicated that she would consider returning to reality television, expressing particular interest in appearing on I'm a Celebrity...Get Me Out of Here!.

== Personal life ==
In 2005, Fedele underwent a breast lift to address excessive sagging, likely resulting from her weight loss of 24 kilograms (53 lb). The surgery apparently cost $14,050.

Fedele gave birth to a daughter in 2015 and has spoken publicly about her health, including undergoing a hysterectomy and bladder surgery. She had stated that she did not intend to have more children and had experienced long-term health issues, including endometriosis and cysts. Her hysterectomy was complicated by an accidental injury to her bladder, requiring an extended surgical procedure to repair the damage. Fedele later recovered from the procedure and has since lived a largely private life in Perth, away from the public spotlight.

== Discography ==
=== Singles ===
List of singles, with selected chart positions
Title	Year	Peak chart positions
Title	Year	AUS
"I'm So Excited (The Bum Dance)" (with Sirens)	2001	12
