= Big Brother (Australian TV series) season 11 =

Big Brother
- Season 11
- Presented by: Sonia Kruger
- No. of days: 80
- No. of housemates: 22
- Winner: Ryan Ginns
- Runners-up: Travis Lunardi; Skye Wheatley
- No. of episodes: 56

Release
- Original network: Nine Network
- Original release: 8 September – 26 November 2014

Season chronology
- ← Previous; Season 10 Next → Season 12

The eleventh season of the Australian reality television series Big Brother, also known as Big Brother 2014, began on 8 September 2014 on the Nine Network. The season ended on 26 November 2014, lasting 80 days. Excluding the celebrity edition and the Channel Seven editions of the show, this is the shortest Big Brother season of the original format on Nine. The winner of the season was Ryan Ginns, who won a total of A$200,000. The show's renewal was confirmed by the Nine Network, who air the show, at the end of the previous season's finale. This was the third season of the show to air on the Nine Network after it picked up the series in 2012, following a four-year absence. The show was originally screened on Network Ten. Sonia Kruger continued as the host of the show, and Mike Goldman continued as the narrator.

== Production ==
=== Auditions ===
On 8 March 2014, details of open auditions for this season were revealed to be taking place in: Perth (3 April 2014), Brisbane (5 & 6 April 2014), Newcastle (10 April 2014), Sydney (12 & 13 April 2014), Albury (15 April 2014), Launceston (23 April 2014), Melbourne (26 & 27 April 2014), Adelaide (29 April 2014), Canberra (1 May 2014) and Townsville (7 May 2014). Applications were also accepted through sending an online video audition and were the only form of auditioning in the Northern Territory, where an applicant would film themselves and address why they thought they would be an ideal candidate for the show. However, these candidates would also be required to attend the open auditions but some may have been fast-tracked to a further stage of auditions if their video was deemed good enough by the show's producers. All applicants were required to be 18 years of age at least and have the necessary paperwork allowing them to stay in Australia until 1 January 2015. A new feature to the audition process was that people were invited to nominate 'a mate'. This involved someone putting another person forward who they thought would be an ideal candidate for the show. Those who were put forward by their 'mate' and were deemed good enough by producers were encouraged to attend further rounds of auditions or in some cases fast-tracked.

=== Development ===
==== Commercial ====
On 13 August 2014, Big Brother Australia posted a photo with the caption "A Storm Is Coming" to their Facebook page. A day later the first commercial aired for the upcoming season featuring a Noah's Ark theme. On 24 August 2014, a second commercial aired stating that "One Housemate will have the ultimate power".

==== The House ====
On 2 April 2014, it was rumoured that for the first time in the show's history, the house would have a second storey when the show's host, Sonia Kruger, announced that the house was "going up". It turned out that the diary room would form the upstairs portion of the house.

== Overview ==
=== Twists ===
- Pair Housemates- Two strangers will compete in pairs. This twist was however put out of play on Day 16.
- Power Play – Each week housemate will be assigned as the Head/s of House and will be given a power play. A housemate is responsible for making decisions regarding on the task given to them. It is similar to United Kingdom's Big Brother UK: Power Trip's Power Trip twist.
- Double Night, Double Eviction – Most weeks would feature two eviction episodes, the first would reveal some of the safe housemates and the first evictee of the week and the second would reveal the second evictee among those that were not safe at the conclusion of the first eviction.
- Mass Eviction – More than 2 housemates got evicted within the week.

=== The House ===
The purpose built house is located at Dreamworld on the Gold Coast Australia. There are two storeys to the House for the first time in the franchise. Housemates enter through a set of gates into the backyard area, which has been described as 'old school Miami cool' with a hint of Hollywood glamour, due to the big pool, flamingo statues, sun loungers, gym area and the skin-coloured textures that are used. Within the pool there is a plastic oversized tube, known as the fishbowl, where Housemates may be sent if they are punished by Big Brother. Also located in the backyard is a treehouse – where Housemates can gossip – for the very first time. The kitchen overlooks the backyard; it has a tropical colouring, with an infusion of yellow and green colours. It includes a surface for preparing food, dining table, and a bar. There is a state-of-the-art shower in the spacious white and blue coloured bathroom, with 'edgy' artwork used as décor. There are two bedrooms, the blue bedroom and the pink bedroom, where Housemates must share a bed with their paired partner. The Diary Room chair is the only room to be located on the second storey. It has wings around it, with the whole room signalling an angelic theme. This season Housemates are playing in pairs and can win the role of Heads of House. During their time as Heads of House, pairs are invited to sleep in the Sanctuary, a private place that includes a bedroom, pool and a hot tub. The Heads of House make important decisions in the Power Room, where any conversations they have must be kept private unless told otherwise by the all-seeing ruler, Big Brother.

On 22 June 2019, Six children were arrested after they burnt down the house itself. The children were found at Coomera railway station shortly after the arson. Two of the children were charged with vandalism. The house was completely destroyed and it was demolished along with the Dreamworld Studios shortly after. Australian YouTuber Muitube filmed the whole house which was a month before the house was burnt down.

== Housemates ==
As of 9 September 2014, sixteen Housemates had entered the House. It was revealed that the Housemates would be entering and playing as pairs. Big Brother determined that each pair was either a good or bad match, based on psychological evaluations.

On Day 24, first intruder Leo entered the house, followed by Marina on Day 35, and Lina, Penny, Richard and Tom on Day 49.

Name	Age on entry	Hometown	Day entered	Day exited	Result
Ryan Ginns	26	Sydney	0	80	Winner
Travis Lunardi	24	Melbourne	0	80	Runner-up
Skye Wheatley	20	Gold Coast	0	80	3rd place
Priya Malik	27	Adelaide	0	79	Evicted
Penny Higgs	30	Victoria	49	79	Evicted
Lina Grant	25	Victoria	49	79	Evicted
David Hodis	31	Sydney	0	72	Evicted
Ryan "Leo" Burke	30	Gold Coast	24	71	Evicted
Richard Hordern-Gibbings	25	Sydney	49	66	Evicted
Tom Mackay	26	Sydney	49	65	Evicted
Kate "Cat" Law	31	Melbourne	2	58	Evicted
Aisha McKinnon	22	Sydney	2	58	Evicted
Lawson Reeves	23	Perth	2	57	Evicted
Marina Rakovskaia	30	Adelaide	36	51	Evicted
Jason Roses	26	Canberra	0	45	Evicted
Sandra Nixon	30	Wagga Wagga	0	44	Evicted
Sam Bramham	26	Melbourne	2	37	Evicted
Lisa Clark	29	Sydney	0	30	Evicted
Jake Richardson	25	Sydney	0	29	Evicted
Katie Schepis	25	Sydney	0	23	Evicted
Dion Kallis	24	Brisbane	0	22	Evicted
Gemma Kinghorn	29	Perth	0	16	Evicted

=== Future appearances ===
In 2015, Priya Malik competed on the ninth season of indian adaptation of Big Brother - Bigg Boss .

In 2024, Skye Wheatley competed and won the tenth season of I'm a Celebrity...Get Me Out of Here!

=== Pairs ===
On launch night it was announced that the housemates would be playing in pairs. Below is a list of the paired housemates. However, this twist was announced to be over on Day 16 after the first eviction.

Pair	Good or Bad Match. (between pairs)
Priya and Katie	Bad
Jake and Gemma	Bad
David and Sandra	Good
Dion and Jason	Good
Skye and Lisa	Bad
Travis and Ryan	Good swapped by Jason
Sam and Cat	Good swapped by Dion
Aisha and Lawson	Good
Travis and Cat	Good
Sam and Ryan	Unknown

The pairs were separated following a swap executed by the Heads of House, Dion and Jason, on Day 8.

=== Head of House ===
The Head of House is responsible for making important decisions in the House (known as Power Plays). As the Housemates are playing in pairs, there will be two Heads of House at a time.

- On Day 0, pre-selected Head of House Priya had to choose whom to pair up with (either Katie or Jake) making them also a 'HoH'. She choose Katie and the pair were given their first Power Play. They had to select one pair of Housemates to be isolated from the House for the first night. They chose Dion & Jason, who were then banished to the fish bowl in the garden. Katie & Priya were then offered a sum of money from the prize fund, however food would be taken from the House. The more money they took, the longer the Housemates would live without food. They decided to take $10,000 in exchange for no food for a week. The amount of money they took was later revealed to the other Housemates – by way of Katie & Priya having to have the $10,000 with them at all times – but, what was not revealed (until Day 4) was that this money was taken from the total prize fund. On Day 6, Katie & Priya made their last Power Play as the Heads of House. They were able to barter with Big Brother, and, for $1,500 each, were able to grant themselves immunity from the first eviction.
- On Day 6, it was revealed that the Australian public had chosen Dion & Jason to be the next Heads of House. On Day 8, Dion and Jason made their first Power Play as the Heads of House. They had to swap a member of one pair with a member from another, thereby creating two new pairs. They chose to switch Cat and Sam and Travis and Ryan. This meant that the new pairs formed were Cat and Travis, and Sam and Ryan. On Day 10, Dion & Jason received the Nominations Power Play. This resulted in them having double the usual number of nomination points to spread across any number of Housemates in the first round of nominations.
- On Day 12, Big Brother 10 winner Tim Dormer re-entered the Big Brother House. He was asked to select the first solo Head of House and was assigned a series of tasks during his stay, which included telling the Housemates they will no longer be playing as pairs after the first eviction. Tim ended up choosing Lawson on Day 13. On Day 16, Lawson received the Nominations Power Play. This resulted in him having 12 nomination points, which could be used to both view other housemates positions on the Nominations Table, as well as nominate. As his second Power Play, Lawson got to choose two housemates that would think they were taking part in an online web chat with fans of the show, when in actuality, the questions from the fans were coming from Lawson and Sam. Lawson chose David and Jason.
- On Day 20, it was revealed that the Australian public had chosen Sam as the new Head of House. Sam was given the opportunity to prank a fellow housemate, along with a housemate of his choice (Sandra). They were asked to pick a housemate that would possibly promote a fake product. They chose Travis to do this. Sam also received the Nominations Power Play, resulting in him having 12 nomination points, which could be used to both view other housemates positions on the Nominations Table, as well as nominate.
- On Day 27, it was revealed that the Australian public had chosen Cat as the new Head of House. As part of the hotel task, where housemates are split into hotel guests and staff that cater to the guests' every need, Cat was asked to divide the housemates into the two categories as her first Power Play. As Head of House, Cat was already a guest, and chose the other six nominated housemates at the time; Aisha, David, Jake, Lisa, Skye and Travis to join her, leaving Jason, Lawson, Leo, Priya, Ryan, Sam and Sandra to be the hotel staff. On Day 30, Cat received the Nominations Power Play, resulting in her having 12 nomination points, which could be used to both view other housemates positions on the Nominations Table, as well as nominate. On Day 31, Cat was offered the chance to view every housemate's nominations from the previous night, in exchange for letting the other housemates view her and Lawson's night in the sanctuary earlier in the week. Cat chose not to view the nominations in exchange for the night in the sanctuary remaining secret.
- On Day 35, it was revealed that the Australian public had chosen Skye as the new Head of House. On Day 37, Skye received the Nominations Power Play, resulting in her having 12 nomination points, which could be used to both view other housemates positions on the Nominations Table, as well as nominate. On Day 38, Skye was offered the chance to win $5,000 by digging through a treasure chest to find 5 gold coins (worth $1,000 each) within 60 seconds, in exchange for her nominations being shown to the rest of the housemates. Skye accepted this task and won the $5,000.
- On Day 41, it was revealed that the Australian public had chosen Priya as the new Head of House. As Priya's first Power Play, she was asked who she thought was coasting in the game. Priya thought Aisha was, and as a result, Aisha was offered $20,000 to evict herself from the house. Aisha declined. However a counteroffer was made. Aisha and Travis were offered $50,000 to split between them if they evicted themselves together. Aisha and Travis declined. On Day 45, Priya received the Nominations Power Play, resulting in her having 12 nomination points, which could be used to both view other housemates positions on the Nominations Table, as well as nominate.
- On Day 49, it was revealed that the Australian public had chosen Ryan as the new Head of House. On Day 51, Ryan was informed that the four new intruders, Lina, Penny, Richard and Tom, were moving from the Sanctuary into the Big Brother House. Ryan was tasked with choosing four original housemates to live in the Sanctuary in their place, indefinitely. Ryan chose Cat, Leo, Priya and Travis.
- On Day 55, it was revealed that the Australian public had chosen David as the new Head of House. As soon as David was appointed, he was asked to choose a housemate living in the Sanctuary to join the housemates for a party. Cat, Leo, Priya and Travis had the opportunity to plea to David to let them attend. David chose Cat to attend the party. On Day 60, David received the Nominations Power Play, resulting in him having 12 nomination points, which could be used to both view other housemates positions on the Nominations Table, as well as nominate.
- On Day 61, the housemates voted in a secret ballot to select the new Head of House. There was a tie between Richard and Travis. The deciding vote was cast by the existing Head of House, David. He picked Travis as the new Head of House. On Day 65, Travis was given a Power Play with several choices. He could eat a whole lasagne cooked by his mother, a smaller portion of lasagne and get the chance to ask Aisha a question, or eat an extremely small portion of lasagne and ask Aisha two questions. Travis chose the final option. His two questions were whether Aisha will move to Melbourne to be with him (she said yes) and which three housemates were most popular based on Sportsbet (Travis, Skye and Ryan). Travis also received the Nominations Power Play, resulting in him being able to nominate for himself, as well as having a loved one nominate on his behalf.
- On Day 69, Travis' week as the Head of House came to end. Entering the final week of the game, no further Heads of House were selected.

Colour key
Won the title of Head of House
Eligible to become Head of House
Not in the House at the time when the Head of House was decided
Was not eligible to become Head of House

Housemate	Day 0–6	Day 6–13	Day 13–20	Day 20–27	Day 27–35	Day 35–41	Day 41–49	Day 49–55	Day 55–61	Day 61–69
Housemate	Pre-selected	Public vote	Tim's choice	Public vote	Public vote	Public vote	Public vote	Public vote	Public vote	House vote
Ryan										
Travis										
Skye										
Priya										
Penny										
Lina										
David										
Leo										
Richard										
Tom										
Cat										
Aisha										
Lawson										
Marina										
Jason										
Sandra										
Sam										
Lisa										
Jake										
Katie										
Dion										
Gemma										

== Weekly Summary ==
Week 1	Entrances	On Day 0, Priya, Katie, Jake, Gemma, David, Sandra, Dion, Jason, Skye, Lisa, Travis and Ryan
Week 1	Twists	On Day 0, it was revealed that the Housemates would play in pairs. The pairs are Katie & Priya, Gemma & Jake, David & Sandra, Dion & Jason, Lisa & Skye, Ryan & Travis, Cat & Sam and Aisha & Lawson.; On Day 0, Katie & Priya were selected as the Heads of House and were given their first Power Play. They had to choose one pair to be banished to the fish bowl in the garden. They chose Dion and Jason. They were then offered up to $10,000 of the prize fund each, however if they chose to accept, the House would go without food for a week. They chose to take $10,000 in exchange for a week without food. The amount of money they took was later revealed to the other Housemates – by way of Katie & Priya having to have the $10,000 with them at all times – but, what was not revealed (until Day 4) was that this money was taken from the total prize fund.; On Day 3, Big Brother opened up 'BB's Diner' in order to test Katie & Priya. Throughout the week, Big Brother will tempt the Housemates with food that they do not have access to. However, the food comes at exorbitant prices, and as only Katie & Priya have money, all other Housemates must go through them if they wish to buy anything. On Day 3, Big Brother offered dessert cakes at $100 a slice. On Day 4, Big Brother offered coffee at $30 a cup, and then later offered a full rib dinner along with two servings of alcohol for $100 a meal.; On Day 6, Katie & Priya made their last Power Play as the Heads of House. They were able to barter with Big Brother, and, for $1,500 each, were able to grant themselves immunity from the first eviction.; On Day 6, it was revealed that the Australian public had chosen Dion & Jason to be the next Heads of House.
Week 1	Punishments	On Day 1, for smuggling a watch into the House, Jason was sent back to the fish bowl where he had to count out loud to 5,000 before he could be released. Since Dion was his partner in the House, Dion had to join him in the fish bowl.
Week 2	Entrances	On Day 9, two poodles called Ned and Kelly entered the Big Brother House.
Week 2	Tasks	On Day 9, Skye & Lisa were tasked with being the chief care givers of Ned & Kelly during their time in the House.; On Day 9, Housemates competed in 'The Perfect Pair' task. This task was based around a number of knock-out rounds between pairs, through several elimination stages, with the winning pair at the end receiving a $30,000 grand prize. In the first round, it was Priya & Katie versus David & Sandra. They had to guess whether the rest of their fellow Housemates would say "Yes" or "No" in response to a series of questions or dilemmas. David & Sandra progressed to the next stage. Aisha & Lawson played against Skye & Lisa in a task where they had to guess the reason for the line-up of the Housemates in the garden. This line-up would always correlate "Most" to "Least" likely (to...). Aisha & Lawson progressed to the next stage. Jake & Gemma were involved in a knock-out round between Cat & Travis. The women from each pair had to sit with their backs to their partner, wearing headphones to ensure they could not hear anything. Their partner meanwhile had to make up a profile of them, guessing things such as who their ideal man was and what their guilty pleasure was. Once they had locked in their answer, the women – who had to make their own decision whilst their backs were turned –, had to reveal their answer. If their partner got it right, the pair would earn one point. In the end, Jake & Gemma were the winning pair, progressing to the next stage.; On Day 11, Aisha & Lawson faced off against David & Sandra in the semi-final round. The winner would progress to the grand final for a chance at the $30,000 grand prize. For this round, they had to stand as a pair on a podium, with the last pair standing being the winners. Aisha & Lawson were the winners, having stood on their podium for more than 4 hours.; On Day 12, Dion & Jason faced off against Jake & Gemma in the semi-final round. They completed in a challenge called 'Living together'. Both pairs had to stay in a small doghouse together. The first to pair to leave the house failed. Neither team left their house and Big Brother finally called an end to the challenge. It came down to a challenge question of how long they had been in the small houses. Dion & Jason was closest to the actual time of 6 hours 19 minutes and 41 seconds and they move on to the final round.; On Day 13, Dion & Jason and Aisha & Lawson competed in "Dancing for Dollars" in the Grand Final for $30,000. They were able to practise in the Big Brother Dance Studio. They needed to develop a dance which incorporated Ballroom and Hip Hop dance moves. The dances were performed during the live show and judged during a snap poll by the viewing public. The winners with 51.8% of the vote was: Aisha & Lawson. The $30,000 had to be split unevenly and as a couple they decided to assign it as follows: Aisha ($20,000), Lawson ($5,000) and gave Jake $5,000.
Week 2	Twists	On Day 8, Dion and Jason made their first Power Play as the Heads of House. They had to swap a member of one pair with a member from another, thereby creating two new pairs. They chose to switch Cat and Sam and Travis and Ryan. This meant that the new pairs formed were Cat and Travis, and Sam and Ryan.; On Day 10, Dion & Jason received the Nominations Super Power for their next Power Play (see Nominations).
Week 2	Punishments	On Day 8, for destroying a pillow, Katie was sent to the fish bowl and was made to sort a box of confetti using only a pair of tweezers. As Priya was her partner, she had to join Katie in completing the punishment set by Big Brother.
Week 2	Nominations	Having won immunity the previous week, Katie & Priya were both safe from being nominated in the first round of Nominations.; As Heads of House, Dion & Jason received the Nominations Super Power for their next Power Play. For the first round of Nominations, they therefore had double the number of nomination points to spread across any number of fellow pairings in the House.; On Day 10, Housemates nominated for the first time and as a result Jake & Gemma, David & Sandra, Cat & Travis and Skye & Lisa all received the most nomination points and were therefore up for eviction this week.; On Day 13, Lisa & Skye, who were the couple with the most save votes at this point, was removed from the couples up for eviction.
Week 2	Exits	On Day 16, Gemma became the first housemate to be evicted from the house

== Nominations Table ==
=== Nominations Power Play ===
The Nominations Power Play is a weekly twist to nominations. It is a special secret power given to the Heads of House. The Nominations Power Play gives an advantage to the Heads of House for nominations in that given week.

- In Week 2's nominations, whilst the other pairs had to distribute five points between their nominations, Heads of House Dion & Jason had ten.
- From Week 3 to Week 7 and Week 9, the Head of House during each week had 12 nomination points, which could be used to both view other housemates positions on the Nominations Table, as well as nominate.
- In Week 10's nominations, whilst all the other housemates had a loved one nominate on their behalf, Head of House Travis was able to nominate for himself, as well as having a loved one nominate on his behalf.

Color key:

Winner
Runner-up
Head(s) of House
Nominated
Exempt
No Nomination
Fake evicted
Evicted

	Week 2		Week 3	Week 4	Week 5	Week 6	Week 7	Week 8	Week 9	Week 10	Week 11			Nomination points received
	Nominations	To save	Week 3	Week 4	Week 5	Week 6	Week 7	Week 8	Week 9	Week 10	Day 79	Finale		Nomination points received
Head(s) of House	Dion & Jason		Lawson	Sam	Cat	Skye	Priya	Ryan	David	Travis	none			Nomination points received
Ryan	4-Gemma & Jake; 1-Lisa & Skye	Not eligible	3-Cat; 2-Jake	3-Skye; 2-Travis	3-Cat; 2-Jason	3-Priya; 2-Skye	3-Travis; 2-Aisha	No nominations	3-Penny; 2-Tom	3-Priya; 2-Lina	No nominations	Winner (Day 80)		28
Travis	3-Gemma & Jake; 2-David & Sandra	Not eligible	4-Dion; 1-Sam	3-Priya; 2-David	3-Sandra; 2-Jason	3-Sandra; 2-Jason	3-Leo; 2-Cat	No nominations	4-Leo; 1-Lina	3-David; 5-Ryan; 2-Leo	No nominations	Runner-up (Day 80)		39
Skye	4-David & Sandra; 1-Ryan & Sam	Not eligible	3-Priya; 2-Dion	3-Lisa; 2-Ryan	4-Lawson; 1-Sam	4-David	3-David; 2-Ryan	No nominations	3-David; 2-Ryan	3-Skye; 4-David; 1-Lina	No nominations	Third place (Day 80)		43
Priya	3-Gemma & Jake; 2-Cat & Travis	Gemma	3-Cat; 2-David	3-Cat; 2-Lawson	3-Lawson; 2-Sandra	2-Sandra; 3-Ryan	1-Travis; 2-David; 2-Skye; 1-Lawson; 1-Leo; 1-Aisha; 1-Marina	No nominations	2-Leo; 3-Richard	3-Priya; 3-David; 2-Ryan	No nominations	Evicted (Day 79)		55
Penny	Not in House							No nominations	3-Leo; 2-Tom	2-Leo; 3-Travis	No nominations	Evicted (Day 79)		6
Lina	Not in House							No nominations	3-Ryan; 2-Tom	3-David; 2-Ryan	No nominations	Evicted (Day 79)		7
David	4-Lisa & Skye; 1-Gemma & Jake	Not eligible	3-Dion; 2-Priya	4-Jake; 1-Priya	3-Jason; 2-Lawson	4-Jason; 1-Leo	3-Priya; 2-Marina	No nominations	5-Skye; 3-Priya	1-Leo; 4-Priya	Evicted (Day 72)			67
Leo	Not in House				Exempt	2-Sandra; 3-Priya	3-Priya; 2-Marina	No nominations	3-Penny; 2-Ryan	2-Skye; 3-David	Evicted (Day 71)			26
Richard	Not in House							No nominations	4-Tom; 1-David	Evicted (Day 66)				5
Tom	Not in House							No nominations	3-Lina; 2-Richard	Evicted (Day 65)				10
Cat	3-Gemma & Jake; 2-David & Sandra	Jake	3-Katie; 2-David	3-David; 2-Lisa	3-Sam; 5-Priya	1-Cat; 2-Leo; 3-Ryan	3-Travis; 2-Priya	No nominations	Evicted (Day 58)					38
Aisha	2-Gemma & Jake; 3-David & Sandra	Jake	3-Katie; 2-Sam	3-Jake; 2-David	3-Sandra; 2-Sam	4-Cat; 1-Ryan	3-Cat; 2-Leo	No nominations	Evicted (Day 58)					13
Lawson	2-Gemma & Jake; 3-David & Sandra	Not eligible	2-Skye; 5-Katie	3-Travis; 2-David	3-Skye; 2-Jason	3-Aisha; 2-Priya	4-Skye; 1-Priya	No nominations	Evicted (Day 57)					22
Marina	Not in House					Exempt	3-Leo; 2-Lawson	Evicted (Day 51)						5
Jason	4-Gemma & Jake; 4-David & Sandra; 2-Lisa & Skye	Jake	3-Sam; 2-Lisa	3-David; 2-Lawson	3-Lawson; 2-Sandra	2-David; 3-Sandra	Evicted (Day 45)							19
Sandra	4-Lisa & Skye; 1-Gemma & Jake	Jake	3-Travis; 2-Skye	3-Skye; 2-David	3-Travis; 2-Skye	3-Priya; 2-Aisha	Evicted (Day 44)							34
Sam	4-Gemma & Jake; 1-Lisa & Skye	Jake	1-Dion; 4-Travis	3-Travis; 5-Aisha	3-Travis; 2-Priya	Evicted (Day 37)								13
Lisa	4-David & Sandra; 1-Ryan & Sam	Jake	3-Cat; 2-Travis	3-David; 2-Cat	Evicted (Day 30)									14
Jake	1-David & Sandra; 4-Cat & Travis	Nominated	2-Katie; 3-Priya	4-Jason; 1-David	Evicted (Day 29)									26
Katie	3-Gemma & Jake; 2-Cat & Travis	Jake	3-Lawson; 2-Cat	Evicted (Day 23)										15
Dion	4-Gemma & Jake; 4-David & Sandra; 2-Lisa & Skye	Jake	2-Katie; 3-Cat	Evicted (Day 22)										10
Gemma	1-David & Sandra; 4-Cat & Travis	Nominated	Evicted (Day 16)											17
Nomination notes	1		2	3	4	5	none	6	7	8	9			
Against public vote	Cat & Travis, David & Sandra, Gemma & Jake, Lisa & Skye	Gemma, Jake	Cat, Dion, Katie, Priya; Travis	Aisha, Cat, David, Jake, Lisa, Skye, Travis	Jason, Lawson, Priya, Sam, Sandra, Travis	David, Jason, Priya, Ryan, Sandra	Cat, David, Leo, Marina, Priya, Skye, Travis	Aisha, Cat, David, Lawson, Leo, Priya, Ryan, Skye, Travis	Leo, Penny, Richard, Ryan, Skye, Tom	David, Leo, Priya, Ryan, Skye	Lina, Penny, Priya, Ryan, Skye, Travis	Ryan, Skye, Travis		
Evicted	None	Gemma; 1 of 9 votes to save	Dion; 16% to save (out of 5)	Jake; 7% to save (out of 7)	Sam; 7% to save	Sandra; 8.8% to save	Marina; 3% to save	Lawson; Fewest votes to save (out of 9)	Tom; Fewest votes to save (out of 6)	Leo; Fewest votes to save (out of 5)	Lina; Fewest votes to win (out of 6)	Skye; 31% to win	Travis; 33% to win	
Evicted	None	Gemma; 1 of 9 votes to save	Dion; 16% to save (out of 5)	Jake; 7% to save (out of 7)	Sam; 7% to save	Sandra; 8.8% to save	Marina; 3% to save	Aisha; Fewest votes to save (out of 4)	Tom; Fewest votes to save (out of 6)	Leo; Fewest votes to save (out of 5)	Penny; Fewest votes to win (out of 6)	Ryan; 36% to win		
Evicted	None	Gemma; 1 of 9 votes to save	Katie; 24% to save (out of 3)	Lisa; 12% to save (out of 5)	Travis; 37% to save	Jason; 16.9% to save	Marina; 3% to save	Aisha; Fewest votes to save (out of 4)	Richard; Fewest votes to save (out of 5)	David; Fewest votes to save (out of 4)	Penny; Fewest votes to win (out of 6)	Ryan; 36% to win		
Evicted	None	Gemma; 1 of 9 votes to save	Katie; 24% to save (out of 3)	Lisa; 12% to save (out of 5)	Travis; 37% to save	Jason; 16.9% to save	Marina; 3% to save	Cat; Fewest votes to save (out of 4)	Richard; Fewest votes to save (out of 5)	David; Fewest votes to save (out of 4)	Priya; Fewest votes to win (out of 6)	Ryan; 36% to win		

=== Notes ===
- ^Note 1: On Day 6, Katie & Priya made their last Power Play as the Heads of House. They were able to barter with Big Brother, and, for $1,500 each, they negotiated themselves immunity from the first nominations. As housemates were playing in pairs during this week, each pairs would vote for other pairs to face eviction. On Day 16, Gemma & Jake received the fewest votes to save and were subject to a house vote to determine which of the two would be evicted. Housemates, by order of random draw, voted to save either Gemma or Jake from eviction. The first Housemate with eight votes to save would be safe, while the other would be evicted. Because Jake received eight votes before all of the votes were cast, David, Lawson, Ryan, Skye, and Travis did not have to vote.
- ^Note 2: Week 3 was a double eviction week, with a surprise eviction occurring on Day 22, where Dion was evicted and Cat was saved. The regularly scheduled eviction took place on Day 23.
- ^Note 3: Week 4 was a double eviction week, with an eviction occurring on both Day 29, where Jake was evicted and Skye was saved, and on Day 30.
- ^Note 4: Leo was exempt from nominations this week, being an intruder. Week 5 was a fake double eviction week, with the first one being fake, and the second being real. Travis received the highest number of votes to save and was fake-evicted.
- ^Note 5: Assuming Travis had been evicted, the housemates could not nominate him; however, Travis secretly nominated from the Sanctuary. Marina was exempt from nominations this week, being an intruder. After telling Lawson who she did not nominate, Cat was penalized, and given one nomination point by Big Brother. Week 6 was a double eviction week, with an eviction occurring on both Day 44, where Sandra was evicted and Ryan was saved, and on Day 45.
- ^Note 6: There were no nominations in Week 8. Instead, all housemates were automatically nominated for eviction. Lina, Penny, Richard and Tom were exempt from nominations this week, being intruders. Week 8 was a triple eviction week, with a singular eviction occurring on Day 57, where Lawson was evicted and David, Priya, Ryan and Skye were saved, and a double eviction occurring on Day 58, where Aisha and Cat were evicted.
- ^Note 7: Week 9 was a double eviction week, with an eviction occurring on Day 65, where Tom was evicted, and on Day 66, where Richard was evicted.
- ^Note 8: On Day 66, after convincing Travis to give them information about his power play, Priya and Skye were penalised and were automatically given three nomination points by Big Brother. Travis was not penalised. This week, each housemate had a loved one enter the house and nominate on their behalf. Week 10 was a double eviction week, with an eviction occurring on Day 71, where Leo was evicted, and on Day 72.
- ^Note 9: For the Final Week, the Australian public began voting for the winner of the eleventh season and the $200,000 grand prize between the Final 6 Housemates. The voting lines froze on Day 79, and the three housemates with the lowest vote totals were evicted, leaving three housemates in the house for the finale.

== Ratings ==
Ratings are rounded to the nearest ten thousand. Figures in Bold indicate timeshifted viewing figures.

	Viewers (millions) 5-City Metro											
	Week 1	Week 2	Week 3	Week 4	Week 5	Week 6	Week 7	Week 8	Week 9	Week 10	Week 11	Week 12
Sunday		**0.71**	**0.71**	**0.63**	0.54							
Monday	1.14	**0.84**	**0.71**	**0.75**	0.72	0.71	0.71	0.78	**0.73**	**0.67**	**0.68**	0.57
Tuesday	0.98	**0.75**	**0.76**	**0.63**	0.72	0.70	0.68	0.65	**0.65**	**0.57**	**0.60**	**0.62**
Wednesday	0.81	**0.71**	**0.67**	**0.70**	0.73	0.63	0.67	0.65	0.36	0.46	0.25	**0.66**
Wednesday	0.81	**0.71**	**0.67**	**0.70**	0.73	0.63	0.67	0.65	0.36	0.46	0.25	**0.73**
Wednesday	0.81	**0.71**	**0.67**	**0.70**	0.73	0.63	0.67	0.65	0.36	0.46	0.25	**0.78**
Thursday	0.94	**0.79**	0.41	0.44	0.76	0.60	0.62	0.71	**0.56**	**0.62**	**0.58**	
Friday	0.36	0.25	0.29	**0.55**	0.55							
Weekly average	0.85	**0.67**	**0.60**	**0.62**	0.67	0.66	0.67	0.70	**0.57**	**0.58**	**0.53**	**0.67**
Running average	0.85	**0.76**	**0.70**	**0.68**	0.68	0.68	0.68	0.68	**0.67**	**0.66**	**0.65**	**0.65**
Series average	0.65											

Combined ratings; the show aired on both Channel Nine & GO! at different times in different states.

== Criticism ==
=== Axing of Live Updates ===
The current season has received criticism for not offering live updates via Twitter and on the official website – with news stories on the site not being posted until after the event has aired, which can be up to 24 hours after the event in question has actually occurred. This lack of live information follows Nine's decision not to offer live camera feeds online after it rebooted the series, believing it did not meet in with their family-friendly rebranded series.

=== Gemma's Eviction ===
The format of the first eviction which saw housemate Gemma evicted, has been considered controversial by many media sources and fans alike. It was seen almost as a form of bullying as the housemates choose in a schoolyard pick style for who stays and goes. Gemma lost to Jake as she only got one person behind her (Priya) and Jake had everyone else
