= Big Brother (Australian TV series) season 2 =

Big Brother
- Season 2
- Presented by: Gretel Killeen
- No. of days: 85
- No. of housemates: 15
- Winner: Peter Corbett
- Runner-up: Marty Martin
- Companion shows: Big Brother Nominations; Big Brother: Uncut
- No. of episodes: 100 (+ 1 special)

Release
- Original network: Network Ten
- Original release: 8 April – 1 July 2002

Season chronology
- ← Previous; Season 1 Next → Season 3

The second season of the Australian reality television series, Big Brother, also known as Big Brother 2002, started on 8 April 2002, and ended on 1 July 2002, lasting 86 days. This season was similar to the first season, and was the only one to use the same house from a previous season, albeit with some small modifications. Simultaneous with the main house was a house of six potential Intruders. A number of television specials allowed viewers to get to know the intruders and viewers were able to vote which three eventually went into the house. Peter Abbott, the show's executive producer, also served as the voice of Big Brother.

A close relationship formed between Nathan Martin and Jess Hardy (Marty and Jess) who later got married after leaving the show. Their wedding plans and the ceremony were showcased in television special Marty & Jess: An Outback Wedding. The couple divorced in 2006. The Australian rock band Killing Heidi entered the house for a special surprise birthday party for Jess. During an Eviction, a 25-year-old male ran naked onto the stage and was subsequently fined $100 in court. The reserved Peter Corbett won the $250,000 first prize, with Marty coming second.

== Housemates ==
Of the Housemates, Jess Hardy previously featured on The Mole 2 and was eliminated in the qualification challenge to determine the main cast. First evictee Damian Hoo is the brother of comeidan Lizzy Hoo who would rise to prominence in the early 2020s.

Name	Age on entry	Day entered	Day exited	Result
Peter Corbett	23	1	86	Winner
Nathan "Marty" Martin	20	1	86	Runner-up
Sahra Kearney	23	1	85	Evicted
Jessica "Jess" Hardy	24	1	78	Evicted
Keiran Tanner	24	31	71	Evicted
Mirabai Peart	21	1	64	Evicted
Alex Christie	30	1	57	Evicted
Nathan Morris	25	1	57	Evicted
Brodie Young	24	31	50	Evicted
Turkan Aksoy	30	1	43	Evicted
Nicole Dickmann	23	31	39	Evicted
Shannon Cleary	31	1	36	Evicted
Aaron Benton	24	1	29	Evicted
Katrina Miani	21	1	22	Evicted
Damian Hoo	21	1	15	Evicted

Previous Potential Housemates

The following three contestants were potential housemates. They lived in an Intruder House along with Nicole, Brodie and Keiran, and were not voted in to the Big Brother house by Australia after a month.

Name	Age on entry	Day entered	Day exited	Result
Hayley	24	1	31	Did Not Enter
Nicki	21	1	31	Did Not Enter
Will	21	1	31	Did Not Enter

== Episodes ==
No. overall	No. in season	Title	Day (Note: Denotes the real-time Day in the house at the time each episode aired. Note: In 2002, the first night was not considered Day 0 like it was in future seasons.)	Original release date	Network
Week 1
101	1	Day One / Daily Show 1	Day 2 (Note: It is typical for a Big Brother Launch episode to be pre-recorded 24-hours prior to broadcast. In 2002, this night was officially labelled Day 1 (despite it being considered Day 0 in every other season, except 2001). As a result, it was Day 2 (in real-time) by the time the series aired.)	8 April 2002	Ten
102	2	Intruders	Day 2	8 April 2002	Ten
103	3	Daily Show 2	Day 3	9 April 2002	Ten
104	4	Daily Show 3	Day 4	10 April 2002	Ten
105	5	Daily Show 4	Day 5	11 April 2002	Ten
106	6	Daily Show 5	Day 6	12 April 2002	Ten
107	7	The Honeymoon’s Over	Day 8	14 April 2002	Ten
Week 2
108	8	Daily Show 6	Day 9	15 April 2002	Ten
109	9	Live Nominations 1	Day 9	15 April 2002	Ten
110	10	Daily Show 7	Day 10	16 April 2002	Ten
111	11	Daily Show 8	Day 11	17 April 2002	Ten
112	12	Daily Show 9	Day 12	18 April 2002	Ten
113	13	Uncut 1	N/A	18 April 2002	Ten
114	14	Daily Show 10	Day 13	19 April 2002	Ten
115	15	Live Eviction 1	Day 15	21 April 2002	Ten
Week 3
116	16	Daily Show 11	Day 16	22 April 2002	Ten
117	17	Live Nominations 2	Day 16	22 April 2002	Ten
118	18	Daily Show 12	Day 17	23 April 2002	Ten
119	19	Daily Show 13	Day 18	24 April 2002	Ten
120	20	Daily Show 14	Day 19	25 April 2002	Ten
121	21	Uncut 2	N/A	25 April 2002	Ten
122	22	Daily Show 15	Day 20	26 April 2002	Ten
123	23	Live Eviction 2	Day 22	28 April 2002	Ten
Week 4
124	24	Daily Show 16	Day 23	29 April 2002	Ten
125	25	Live Nominations 3	Day 23	29 April 2002	Ten
126	26	Daily Show 17	Day 24	30 April 2002	Ten
127	27	Daily Show 18	Day 25	1 May 2002	Ten
128	28	Daily Show 19	Day 26	2 May 2002	Ten
129	29	Uncut 3	N/A	2 May 2002	Ten
130	30	Daily Show 20	Day 27	3 May 2002	Ten
131	31	Live Eviction 3	Day 29	5 May 2002	Ten
132	32	Intruders: You Decide	N/A	5 May 2002	Ten
Week 5
133	33	Daily Show 21	Day 30	6 May 2002	Ten
134	34	Live Nominations 4	Day 30	6 May 2002	Ten
135	35	Daily Show 22	Day 31	7 May 2002	Ten
136	36	Intruders Unleashed	Day 31	7 May 2002	Ten
137	37	Daily Show 23	Day 32	8 May 2002	Ten
138	38	Daily Show 24	Day 33	9 May 2002	Ten
139	39	Uncut 4	N/A	9 May 2002	Ten
140	40	Daily Show 25	Day 34	10 May 2002	Ten
141	41	Live Eviction 4	Day 36	12 May 2002	Ten
Week 6
142	42	Daily Show 26	Day 37	13 May 2002	Ten
143	43	Live Nominations 5	Day 37	13 May 2002	Ten
144	44	Daily Show 27	Day 38	14 May 2002	Ten
145	45	Daily Show 28	Day 39	15 May 2002	Ten
146	46	Housemates’ Revenge (Intruder Eviction)	Day 39	15 May 2002	Ten
147	47	Daily Show 29	Day 40	16 May 2002	Ten
148	48	Uncut 5	N/A	16 May 2002	Ten
149	49	Daily Show 30	Day 41	17 May 2002	Ten
150	50	Live Eviction 5	Day 43	19 May 2002	Ten
Week 7
151	51	Daily Show 31	Day 44	20 May 2002	Ten
152	52	Live Nominations 6	Day 44	20 May 2002	Ten
153	53	Daily Show 32	Day 45	21 May 2002	Ten
154	54	Daily Show 33	Day 46	22 May 2002	Ten
155	55	Daily Show 34	Day 47	23 May 2002	Ten
156	56	Uncut 6	N/A	23 May 2002	Ten
157	57	Daily Show 35	Day 48	24 May 2002	Ten
158	58	Live Eviction 6	Day 50	26 May 2002	Ten
Week 8
159	59	Daily Show 36	Day 51	27 May 2002	Ten
160	60	Live Nominations 7	Day 51	27 May 2002	Ten
161	61	Daily Show 37	Day 52	28 May 2002	Ten
162	62	Daily Show 38	Day 53	29 May 2002	Ten
163	63	Daily Show 39	Day 54	30 May 2002	Ten
164	64	Uncut 7	N/A	30 May 2002	Ten
165	65	Daily Show 40	Day 55	31 May 2002	Ten
166	66	Live Eviction 7	Day 57	2 June 2002	Ten
Week 9
167	67	Daily Show 41	Day 58	3 June 2002	Ten
168	68	Live Nominations 8	Day 58	3 June 2002	Ten
169	69	Daily Show 42	Day 59	4 June 2002	Ten
170	70	Daily Show 43	Day 60	5 June 2002	Ten
171	71	Daily Show 44	Day 61	6 June 2002	Ten
172	72	Uncut 8	N/A	6 June 2002	Ten
173	73	Daily Show 45	Day 62	7 June 2002	Ten
174	74	Live Eviction 8	Day 64	9 June 2002	Ten
Week 10
175	75	Daily Show 46	Day 65	10 June 2002	Ten
176	76	Live Nominations 9	Day 65	10 June 2002	Ten
177	77	Daily Show 47	Day 66	11 June 2002	Ten
178	78	Mastercard $100,000 Challenge	Day 66	11 June 2002	Ten
179	79	Daily Show 48	Day 67	12 June 2002	Ten
180	80	Daily Show 49	Day 68	13 June 2002	Ten
181	81	Uncut 9	N/A	13 June 2002	Ten
182	82	Daily Show 50	Day 69	14 June 2002	Ten
183	83	Live Eviction 9	Day 71	16 June 2002	Ten
Week 11
184	84	Daily Show 51	Day 72	17 June 2002	Ten
185	85	Live Nominations 10	Day 72	17 June 2002	Ten
186	86	Daily Show 52	Day 73	18 June 2002	Ten
187	87	Daily Show 53	Day 74	19 June 2002	Ten
188	88	Daily Show 54	Day 75	20 June 2002	Ten
189	89	Uncut 10	N/A	20 June 2002	Ten
190	90	Daily Show 55	Day 76	21 June 2002	Ten
191	91	Live Eviction 10	Day 78	23 June 2002	Ten
Week 12
192	92	Daily Show 56	Day 79	24 June 2002	Ten
193	93	The Final Countdown	Day 79	24 June 2002	Ten
194	94	Daily Show 57	Day 80	25 June 2002	Ten
195	95	Daily Show 58	Day 81	26 June 2002	Ten
196	96	Daily Show 59	Day 82	27 June 2002	Ten
197	97	Uncut 11 (International Special)	N/A	27 June 2002	Ten
198	98	Daily Show 60	Day 83	28 June 2002	Ten
199	99	Live Eviction 11	Day 85	30 June 2002	Ten
Week 13
200	100	The Final Eviction (Live Finale)	Day 86	1 July 2002	Ten

=== Specials ===
No. overall	No. in season	Title	Original release date
100	N/A	Housemates: Who Will They Be?	7 April 2002
A special that aired shortly before the second season, featuring information about the casting process. It was hosted by Gretel Killeen.

== Nominations table ==
Color key:

Winner
Runner-up
Nominated
Exempt
No Nominations
Intruder Vote
Evicted

	Week 2	Week 3	Week 4	Week 5	Week 6		Week 7	Week 8	Week 9	Week 10	Week 11	Week 12		Nominations points received
	Week 2	Week 3	Week 4	Week 5	Nominations	Intruder Eviction	Week 7	Week 8	Week 9	Week 10	Week 11	Day 85	Finale	Nominations points received
Peter	2–Damian; 1–Shannon	2–Katrina; 1–Alex	2–Turkan; 1–Jessica	2–Shannon; 1–Jessica	2–Sahra; 1–Nathan	Nicole; Keiran	2–Marty; 1–Nathan	No nominations	2–Keiran; 1–Mirabai	2–Marty; 1–Jessica	2–Sahra; 1–Jessica	No nominations	Winner (Day 86)	17
Marty	2–Turkan; 1–Katrina	2–Mirabai; 1–Katrina	2–Turkan; 1–Aaron	2–Mirabai; 1–Turkan	2–Turkan; 1–Sahra	Brodie; Keiran	2–Brodie; 1–Mirabai	No nominations	2–Mirabai; 1–Keiran	2–Keiran; 1–Sahra	2–Peter; 1–Sahra	No nominations	Runner-Up (Day 86)	10
Sahra	2–Katrina; 1–Shannon	2–Katrina; 1–Turkan	2–Turkan; 1–Aaron	2–Shannon; 1–Mirabai	2–Turkan; 1–Mirabai	Brodie; Keiran	2–Mirabai; 1–Brodie	No nominations	2–Mirabai; 1–Keiran	2–Keiran; 1–Jessica	2–Peter; 1–Jessica	No nominations	Evicted (Day 85)	16
Jessica	2–Katrina; 1–Alex	2–Katrina; 1–Turkan	2–Turkan; 1–Alex	2–Peter; 1–Turkan	2–Alex; 1–Turkan	Brodie; Keiran	2–Keiran; 1–Brodie	No nominations	2–Peter; 1–Sahra	2–Keiran; 1–Sahra	2–Sahra; 1–Peter	Evicted (Day 78)		36
Keiran	Intruder; House			Entered	Exempt	Nominated	2–Marty; 1–Jessica	No nominations	2–Mirabai; 1–Jessica	2–Jessica; 1–Marty	Evicted (Day 71)			14
Mirabai	2–Alex; 1–Jessica	2–Alex; 1–Jessica	2–Jessica; 1–Alex	2–Alex; 1–Jessica	2–Sahra; 1–Jessica	Brodie; Nicole	2–Jessica; 1–Keiran	No nominations	2–Sahra; 1–Keiran	Evicted (Day 64)				23
Alex	2–Mirabai; 1–Turkan	2–Turkan; 1–Mirabai	2–Jessica; 1–Shannon	2–Shannon; 1–Mirabai	2–Jessica; 1–Mirabai	Exempt	2–Jessica; 1–Brodie	No nominations	Evicted (Day 57)					16
Nathan	2–Katrina; 1–Turkan	2–Turkan; 1–Katrina	2–Turkan; 1–Mirabai	2–Peter; 1–Turkan	2–Peter; 1–Turkan	Brodie; Keiran	2–Brodie; 1–Mirabai	No nominations	Evicted (Day 57)					7
Brodie	Intruder; House			Entered	Exempt	Nominated	2–Jessica; 1–Marty	Evicted (Day 50)						7
Turkan	2–Jessica; 1–Alex	2–Jessica; 1–Sahra	2–Jessica; 1–Nathan	2–Shannon; 1–Nathan	2–Nathan; 1–Jessica	Brodie; Nicole	Evicted (Day 43)							36
Nicole	Intruder; House			Entered	Exempt	Nominated	Evicted (Day 39)							N/A
Shannon	2–Peter; 1–Turkan	2–Peter; 1–Turkan	2–Turkan; 1–Jessica	2–Alex; 1–Turkan	Evicted (Day 36)									11
Hayley	Intruder; House			Did Not Enter	Evicted (Day 31)									N/A
Nikki	Intruder; House			Did Not Enter	Evicted (Day 31)									N/A
Will	Intruder; House			Did Not Enter	Evicted (Day 31)									N/A
Aaron	2–Katrina; 1–Damian	2–Marty; 1–Katrina	2–Jessica; 1–Nathan	Evicted (Day 29)										4
Katrina	2–Damian; 1–Turkan	2–Aaron; 1–Alex	Evicted (Day 22)											20
Damian	2–Katrina; 1–Turkan	Evicted (Day 15)												5
Notes	none			1	1	1	none	2	none			3	4	
Nominated	Damian, Katrina, Turkan	Alex, Katrina, Turkan	Aaron, Alex, Jessica, Nathan, Turkan	Alex, Mirabai, Peter, Shannon, Turkan	Brodie, Keiran, Nicole	Jessica, Sahra, Turkan	Brodie, Jessica, Marty	Alex, Jessica, Keiran, Marty, Mirabai, Nathan, Peter, Sahra	Keiran, Mirabai, Sahra	Jessica, Keiran, Marty	Jessica, Peter, Sahra	Marty, Peter, Sahra	Marty, Peter	
Evicted	Damian; 40% to evict	Katrina; 57% to evict	Aaron; 51% to evict	Hayley, Nikki, Will; Fewest votes to enter	Turkan; 49% to evict	Nicole; 3 of 14 votes to stay	Brodie; 49% to evict	Nathan; 39% to evict (out of 8)	Mirabai; 62% to evict	Keiran; 55% to evict	Jessica; 37% to evict	Sahra; 41% to evict	Marty; 59% to evict	
Evicted	Damian; 40% to evict	Katrina; 57% to evict	Aaron; 51% to evict	Shannon; 37% to evict	Turkan; 49% to evict	Nicole; 3 of 14 votes to stay	Brodie; 49% to evict	Alex; 24% to evict (out of 7)	Mirabai; 62% to evict	Keiran; 55% to evict	Jessica; 37% to evict	Sahra; 41% to evict	Marty; 59% to evict	
Saved	Turkan; 30.5% Katrina; 29.5%	Turkan; 23% Alex; 20%	Jessica; 21% Nathan; 13% Turkan; 10% Alex; 5%	Turkan; 30% Peter; 16% Mirabai; 9% Alex; 8%	Jessica; 33% Sahra; 18%	Keiran; 5 votes Brodie; 6 votes	Jessica; 39% Marty; 12%	Jessica; Keiran; Marty; Mirabai; Peter; Sahra	Keiran; 20% Sahra; 18%	Jessica; 33% Marty; 12%	Peter; 32% Sahra; 31%	Peter; 30% Marty; 29%	Peter; 41% to evict	

=== Notes ===
- ^Note 1: Australia voted Brodie, Keiran, and Nicole into the House as Intruders on Day 31. While they were immune from the regular Nominations, they were nominated for a house vote eviction on Day 39. The Housemates participated in a structured debate on which intruder should stay before the intruders pleaded their case before voting. The Housemates vote for the 2 intruders they wish to stay. As Alex was the moderator for the intruder debate, he did not vote.
- ^Note 2: This week, Big Brother informed the Housemates that they all were nominated in a special Double Eviction. On Nominations night, instead of voting, each Housemate pleaded their case to Australia on why they should stay.
- ^Note 3: There were no Nominations in Week 12. The final three housemates automatically faced Australia's Vote.
- ^Note 4: For the finale, Australia voted to evict between the final two housemates. The winner of Big Brother Australia 2002 and the $250,000 grand prize would be the finalist with the fewest votes to evict.

== Special episodes ==
In addition to the pre season special, a number of special episodes also aired during the original run of the season. These included:

=== Intruders ===
Aired the same night as the Launch show, the Intruders special revealed the six possible intruders: Hayley, Kieran, Brodie, Nicki, Nicole and Will. Gretel explained that the public will decide which intruders will enter the Big Brother house. Psychologist Carmel Hill provided insight into the personalities of the intruders.

=== The Honeymoon's Over ===
One week after the launch, Gretel presents a program in anticipation of the first round of nominations the following night. Packages are shown exploring the impact of different platonic and romantic relationships in the House, with added comments from Daily Show supervising producer Chris Blackburn. First season winner Ben Williams and psychologist Carmel Hill analyse potential nomination strategies.

=== Intruders: You Decide ===
After nearly four weeks living in the secret intruder house, it is time for the public to vote on which three intruders will enter the main Big Brother house. Viewers are shown the secret intruder house for the first time and how the intruders are adjusting to life together, and also to no communication from the outside world.

=== Intruders Unleashed ===
Gretel hosts a live special in which the results of the intruder vote are revealed and the intruders are released into the house. Psychologist Carmel Hill is on hand to analyse the impact of arrivals. Also, one housemate asks for permission to leave the house.

=== Housemates' Revenge ===
Gretel hosts a live special in which the original Housemates must vote to evict one of the three Intruders. Each Housemate is given one minute to make a case for the Intruder(s) they want to keep, then each Intruder is given an opportunity to state their case, before the Housemates cast their votes.

=== Mastercard Charity Challenge ===
Gretel drops in on the house in a live special to host a series of challenges for the Final 5 Housemates to raise up to $50,000 for their chosen charities. Before the final challenge, Mastercard surprised the Housemates with a personal cash prize split between the 5, equal to the amount raised for their charities.

=== The Final Countdown ===
With three housemates remaining and no Nominations to cast, Gretel is joined by Psychologist Carmel Hill, Big Brother 2001 finalists, Sara-Marie, Blair and Ben, as well as evicted housemates Shannon & Nathan and the most recent evictee Jess to discuss the Final 3 ahead of their final week in the house.

== Aftermath ==
Following his appearance on Big Brother, Nathan Morris transitioned into radio broadcasting and became co-host of Perth's top-rating breakfast program, Nathan, Nat & Shaun, on Nova 93.7. Morris later revealed that he had been offered several high-profile entertainment opportunities following his appearance on the show, including a talk show modelled on Rove Live, an animated television series based on his personality, a role in the New Zealand soap opera Shortland Street, and a recording contract, despite joking that no one had checked whether he "could actually sing". Moreover, Nathan, Nat & Shaun has been Perth's highest-rating breakfast radio program for six consecutive years.

During the series, Jess Hardy began a relationship with fellow housemate Nathan "Marty" Martin, with the pair becoming known in the media as "Australia's sweethearts". They later starred in the television special Marty and Jess: An Outback Wedding, which documented their marriage in 2004. The couple divorced in 2006, approximately 15 months after the televised wedding. Hardy's brother, Billy Hardy, was among those killed in the 2002 Bali bombings. In 2025, Hardy revealed that she had been diagnosed with breast cancer. She underwent a double mastectomy and has continued to receive chemotherapy following the diagnosis after the cancer was found to have persisted. Hardy has continued working in radio with Star 104.5 and remains active on social media.

Following public criticism of Governor-General Peter Hollingworth over his handling of child sexual abuse allegations while Anglican Archbishop of Brisbane, Turkan Aksoy publicly revealed that she had been sexually abused as a child and joined Big Brother winner Peter Corbett in supporting the Bravehearts White Balloon Day campaign. Aksoy said she hoped that sharing her experience would encourage other survivors to speak out, while the campaign sought to raise awareness that child sexual abuse often remains hidden. In 2018, Aksoy, then a Cultural and Inclusion Officer with the City of Canterbury-Bankstown, was recognised among the Top 50 Public Sector Women in New South Wales for her leadership in the public sector.
