= Big Brother (Australian TV series) =

Australian television series

- Logo since season 16
- Genre: Reality television
- Based on: Big Brother by John de Mol Jr.
- Presented by: Gretel Killeen; Kyle Sandilands; Jackie O; Sonia Kruger; Mel Tracina
- Narrated by: Mike Goldman; Sonia Kruger
- Country of origin: Australia
- Original language: English
- No. of seasons: 17 (regular seasons); 2 (celebrity seasons)
- No. of episodes: 1,671

Production
- Executive producers: Peter Abbot (2001–2003); Kris Noble (2004–2007); Virginia Hodgson (2008); Alex Mavroidakis (2012–2014); Amelia Fisk (2020–2023); Sarah Thornton (2025–present)
- Production companies: Southern Star Endemol (2001–03; 2013); Endemol Southern Star (2004–08); Southern Star Entertainment (2012); Endemol Australia (2012, 2014); Endemol Shine Australia (2020–present)

Original release
- Network: Network Ten
- Release: 24 April 2001 – 21 July 2008
- Network: Nine Network
- Release: 13 August 2012 – 26 November 2014
- Network: Seven Network
- Release: 8 June 2020 – 6 December 2023
- Network: Network 10
- Release: 9 November 2025 – present

Related
- Celebrity Big Brother; Big Brother VIP

Big Brother (also known as Big Brother Australia) is an Australian reality show based on the international Big Brother format created by John de Mol Jr.. Following the premise of other versions of the format, the show features a group of contestants, known as "housemates" who live together in a specially constructed house that is isolated from the outside world. The housemates are continuously monitored during their stay in the house by live television cameras as well as personal audio microphones. Throughout the course of the competition, housemates are evicted from the house – eliminated from the competition. The last remaining housemate wins the competition and is awarded a cash prize. The series is named after the fictional totalitarian dictator from George Orwell's 1949 novel Nineteen Eighty-Four.

Big Brother was produced from 2001 and ran for eight seasons and a Celebrity Edition on Network Ten before the network cancelled it in July 2008 after experiencing audience erosion and controversy. Big Brother returned in 2012 on the Nine Network. Nine's iteration of the series lasted 3 seasons and was not renewed beyond 2015. Each of the first eleven previous seasons was produced by Endemol Australia and Endemol Southern Star.

In 2019, the Seven Network picked up the series, which was produced by Endemol Shine Australia. This iteration of the series was pre-recorded and featured a revamped competitive format, based on the American version of Big Brother and ran for four regular seasons (including a special edition featuring new and returning housemates in commemoration of the show's 21st anniversary in 2022) as well as a celebrity edition titled Big Brother VIP. As a result of a poor reception to the 15th season, a planned 16th season (and the fifth to be aired by Seven) that was announced for 2024 did not eventuate.

In November 2025, Big Brother returned to Network 10 for its sixteenth season, returning to the original live format with live nominations and evictions, with evictions decided by viewers and a 24/7 live stream, with Endemol Shine Australia continuing to produce. In April 2026, Big Brother was confirmed to be returning in 2026 for its seventeenth season, to again air on Network 10. The season began airing on 26 October 2026.

On 28 October 2026, at the Network 10 Upfronts Big Brother was renewed for its eighteenth season which will be aired in 2027.

== Format ==
Housemates must remain in the house at all times, with the aim of avoiding eviction from the house to be the last Housemate remaining to win a substantial cash prize at the end of the series. Alternatively, housemates can also be removed from the house if Big Brother feels this is necessary and can voluntarily leave the show at any time. In order to support the housemates' well-being, all participants have access to psychologists and a doctor at all times. Housemates are filmed 24 hours per day with edited highlights broadcast during prime time slots every evening.

=== Big Brother ===
While in the house, the housemates are under the watchful eye of Big Brother — the embodiment of the show's producers, who will act as an authoritative all-seeing voice of God to the housemates. Housemates are at all times under the control of Big Brother, a rule-enforcing authority figure who monitors the housemates' behaviour, sets tasks and punishments and provides the mechanism for contestants to make external requests. Unlike other versions of Big Brother, housemates would refer to Big Brother as if it was one person. Over the course of the series, Big Brother developed a dry wit in his interactions with the housemates. He would also offer to counsel his housemates in need of his wisdom.

==== Voice ====
Executive producer Peter Abbott voiced Big Brother in seasons 1–3. Executive producer Nick Colquhoun provided the main voice of Big Brother in seasons 4–7, particularly during live nominations, eviction nights and other special shows, with Aaron Lucas and Rikkie Proost serving as the voice at other times during the show in the aforementioned seasons. Jonathan Coffey and Mark Grieve also voiced Big Brother in the early-mid seasons, and Amy Peel provided the female voice of Big Brother in season 7. Leon Murray provided the voice in the 2008 and 2012–2014 seasons. Chris Coucouvinis voiced Big Brother in the 2020–2023 seasons and Gold Coast-based voice artist Pete Cunningham provided the voice of Big Brother for the 2025 season.

In addition to the character of Big Brother, seasons 9–11 featured Surly the Pufferfish, who was voiced by the show's executive producer Alex Mavroidakis using a Cockney accent.

=== Eviction format ===
Over the duration of the competition, the housemates will face nominations and evictions to evict housemates from the house, eliminating them from the game. However, throughout the series, the format regarding evictions has changed.

==== Original format ====
For Ten's and Nine's iterations of the series, the format of the show resembled the original Dutch version of the show - a format adapted by most versions of the Big Brother format. In this format, the competitive aspects are minimised. The eviction decisions were determined by viewer voting, housemates were not allowed to discuss nominations (at the risk of punishment) and most seasons did not feature any regular competitions for power or safety (except the Friday Night Games (seasons 5–8) and Showdowns (season 10) — where the winners were offered limited power to change the Nominations after the house had voted).

The main elements of the original format are as follows:

- Nominations: Every week, the housemates would participate in nominations, a secret voting process to determine who would be nominated for eviction that week. Each Housemate nominated two other fellow housemates in the Diary Room, providing full reasons to Big Brother for their nominations. The three or more housemates with the most nominations were nominated and faced Australia's vote
  - For seasons 1–7 and the second half of season 8; each housemate had 3 nomination points to vote for two housemates — one housemate for two points, and another with one.
  - For the first half of season 8; The power over nominations was given the viewers, with Australia voting to save a housemate via televoting and the 3 lowest vote receivers facing a House Eviction Vote.
  - For seasons 9–11 and 16–present; each housemate had 5 nomination points to vote for two housemates - For a 3/2 or 4/1 point allocation.
- Eviction: After the nominations are finalised, voting for viewers is open, with Australia voting to determine the evictee of that week.
  - For seasons 1–5 and the second half of season 8; viewers voted to evict a nominee. The nominee with the most votes is evicted.
  - For seasons 6 and 7; viewers had the option to both save and evict. Both vote tallies would be combined and the nominee with the highest net-evict vote (or lowest net-save vote), is evicted.
  - For the first half of season 8; the housemates voted between Australia's nominees in a similar style to the original nomination vote (3 Eviction Votes to be allocated in a 2/1 vote allocation). The housemate with the most votes is evicted.
  - For seasons 9–11 and 16–present; viewers voted to save a nominee. The nominee with the fewest votes is evicted.
- Finale: The final housemates would face a final vote to determine the winner of the series.
  - For seasons 1–5 and 8; viewers voted to evict between the final 2 (seasons 1–5) or final 3 (season 8) housemates. The housemate with the fewest votes is declared the winner.
  - For seasons 6 and 7; viewers had the option to both vote to save and to evict between the final 2 housemates. Both vote tallies would be combined and the housemates with the highest net-save vote (or lowest net-evict vote), is declared the winner.
  - For seasons 9–11; final voting began with the final 5 or 6 housemates with Australia voting to win. Throughout the final week, the housemates with the lowest vote total are progressively evicted until 3 remain for the grand finale. Of the final 3, the finalist with the most votes to win is declared the winner.
  - For season 16, final voting began with the final 5 housemates with Australia voting to win. The finalist with the most votes to win is declared the winner.
- Voting Method: Australia voted throughout the show by the following methods
  - The first 8 seasons featured televoting - with viewers being invited to call the phone number during the show.
  - Seasons 9-11 featured televoting and voting via social media.
  - Seasons 16–present featured voting integrated on the 10 App.

==== Seven Network format (seasons 12–15) ====
In 2020, the Seven Network revived the series in a format inspired by the American and Canadian editions - with housemates deciding both nominations and evictions among themselves. The new format emphasised the competitive aspect of surviving the eviction process. As such, the housemates were allowed to strategise, politic and collude about the nominations and evictions. However, there were still be key differences compared to the American and Canadian formats, most prominently with the Australian public still deciding the eventual winner - rather than being decided by a "Jury" of evicted housemates (as is the case on the American and Canadian show).

- Nominations: At the start of each round, the housemates compete in a "Nomination Challenge". The winner of the challenge is safe from eviction and get power over the nominations. Immediately after the challenge, Big Brother will call the winning housemate to the Diary Room to name their nominees and provide full reasons for their nominations. The number of nominees is determined by how far into the overall game housemates are, as the game starts with three nominees and reduces to two nominees towards the end of the game.
- Eviction: On eviction night, all housemates must vote to evict one of the nominees, with the exception of the nominating housemate (who will only cast a tie-breaker vote, if required), nor do the nominated housemates vote when there are only two nominees (on account of their votes cancelling the other's out). The eviction vote is by secret ballot, with housemates casting their votes orally in the Diary Room to Big Brother and must provide a reason for their vote. The nominee with the most votes is evicted from the house.
- Finale: At the end of the series when the grand final makes its way, the final three housemates that are left will face Australia's vote to determine the winner. This vote is conducted on a dedicated website, with voters voting for a winner. The finalist with the most votes is declared the winner of Big Brother.

=== Prize money ===
The winner of Big Brother Australia receives a cash prize for being the last remaining housemate.

- In seasons 1–3, 8–10 and 13–14, the prize was guaranteed A$250,000. Some seasons only mentioned the grand prize part-way through the series.
  - Seasons 11 and 12 also intended to have a A$250,000 prize, but tasks and challenges during both seasons resulted in the prize decreasing. In season 11, the final prize was A$200,000 and in season 12 the prize was A$234,656.
- In season 4, the prize money was a guaranteed A$1,000,000.
- Seasons 5 and 6 continued to offer the A$1,000,000 but introduced a fine system. The winner of season 5 received $836,000, while the winner of season 6 received A$426,000.
- Season 7 was advertised as having no prize money. When the series began, it was revealed the grand prize would be based on the household's completion of weekly tasks. The grand-prize money was A$450,000.
  - A variation of this twist was used on season 16 and 17, with the prize starting as A$100,000, and able to increase or decrease based on tasks and events in the house. The grand total was A$135,000.
- The shortened season 15 had a prize of A$100,000.
- In both celebrity spin-offs, Celebrity Big Brother Australia and Big Brother VIP Australia, the winner was awarded A$100,000 to the charity of their choice.

In addition to the grand prize, housemates may also win additional prizes in different challenges and tasks held in the house. Further, each evictee (particularly during the first Network Ten iteration) would receive a consolation prize, which could include holidays, cars and a small cash prize - usually from the show's sponsors as a form of Product placement.

=== Tasks and missions ===
During their time in the house, housemates are given tasks by Big Brother.

=== Punishments ===
Season 5 introduced a fines system in which the $1,000,000 cash prize was decreased by $5,000 each time housemates violated a rule of Big Brother. The house used for season 6 featured a Punishment Room, where housemates would sometimes be sent to be punished in addition to the $5,000 fine. In season 7, some changes were made. These monetary fines were subtracted from the household budget rather than from the prize money, while the Punishment Room remained.

In season 9, there was a small, rectangular-shaped room, linked to the lounge. This room was the Naughty Corner. This room was similar to the Punishment Room of the sixth and seventh seasons. The eighth and ninth seasons featured no fines system at all. Instead, Big Brother used the original striking system more frequently which meant when a housemate received three strikes they were evicted.

=== Intruders ===
Most seasons of Big Brother Australia usually includes "Intruders". Intruders are new housemates added to the house by the show's producers as ongoing housemates after the series has started. Intruders will be eligible to win the series but will often face a special "Intruder Eviction" shortly after their entrance to the house (either by house vote, Australia's vote or some combination of both).

== Big Brother in Australia ==
=== First Network Ten iteration (2001–2008) ===
The first Australian series began to broadcast on 24 April 2001. It was hosted by Gretel Killeen from 2001 to 2007. In late 2007 it was announced that Gretel Killeen would not host the show for its 2008 return as part of a revamp of the formula.

In 2008, Big Brother returned for its eighth season with hosts Kyle Sandilands and Jackie O. Ten's chief programmer, David Mott, admitted the series had recently experienced "audience erosion" inherent with the show's long run. Mott defended the new hosts saying that the ratings for eviction shows held up.

Mike Goldman provided narration and voice-overs for all eight seasons, as well as hosting many of the companion shows. He was also notably the audience warm-up person during Live Evictions.

=== First hiatus ===
Big Brother Australia was axed by Network Ten on 14 July 2008 with the broadcaster confirming that the 2008 season would be the last to air on the channel. A decrease in ratings for the daily shows was cited as the reason for Network Ten opting not to renew its contract for another season.

After the show was axed in 2008, there were many rumours about a possible revival by Nine, Seven, Ten, or SBS. SBS Programmer Shawn White denied the show would be revived on their channel despite rumours with Nine CEO David Gyngell notably 'interested' in the idea soon after the cancellation, only to turn it down days later. The Seven Network expressed interest since bidding for the show after the seventh-season finale; however, denied any and all revival occurring a week after the 2008 finale on morning program Sunrise.

Most notably, Network Ten expressed some interest in the format when on 3 June 2011, News Limited posted an article suggesting the network may be interested in putting it on its digital channel, Eleven. In the article, Chief Programming Officer David Mott stated that "...Ten have considered ways to bring the show back on a number of occasions'; however, was worried that audiences had 'moved on'. Made mention was the American version where the show has had 12 successful seasons, and a thirteenth on the way." Mott said; "It's a summer show for CBS, it doesn't play in the heart of the ratings season but it's done a pretty good job for them."

=== Nine Network iteration (2012–2014) ===
On 9 September 2011, it was reported and later confirmed that the Nine Network had signed a deal with Southern Star Group to bring the Australian version of Big Brother back. On 22 February 2012 it was confirmed that Dreamworld would be used again as the location for the 2012 series.

The first episode of the revived series premiered on 13 August 2012 with its daily show airing five nights a week at a family-friendly timeslot of 7pm.

After a successful season in 2012, Nine confirmed that the series would be renewed for Season 10 in 2013 during their Nine Network 2013 promotion and during the 2013 finale, host Sonia Kruger confirmed the series renewal for Season 11 in 2014 formally opening auditions.

=== Second hiatus ===
In 2018, Big Brother returned to Australia as Nine confirmed they would air the first season of Celebrity Big Brother. Nine created a special logo for the show resembling the eye logo of Nine's iteration of Big Brother Australia that previously aired on the network. Episodes were "fast-tracked" and available on their streaming service 9Now shortly after their American airing with televised broadcast on 9Go! starting 11 February 2018. Due to low ratings episodes were moved from the 9:30 pm timeslot to 11:30 pm effective 14 February 2018. No further American seasons of Big Brother aired.

On 1 April 2018, a highly publicised April Fools prank by the Australian television news blog TV Tonight reported the return of Big Brother on Ten with Lisa Wilkinson to host.

=== Seven Network iteration (2020–2023) ===
On 23 October 2019, Seven Network confirmed it would be reviving the series in 2020. Rumours indicated the series would be closer in format to the American and Canadian versions - particularly given the upfronts trailer featured footage from Big Brother US 17, Big Brother Canada 2 and Big Brother Canada 3 as well as the emphasis on the phrase "Control, Evict, Win" in the promo.

The reboot has been compared to Survivor — in which the politicking and strategising regarding the Nomination and Eviction processes is allowed (being disallowed in earlier iterations) and central to the format, with housemates directly voting each other out of the house. Seven's Director of Programming Angus Ross confirmed that the revived format would be prerecorded and aired at a later date on 26 October 2019. It was announced on 5 February 2020 that Sonia Kruger would return to host the revival.

The first season of the new revival (and twelfth overall) launched on 8 June 2020, running until 22 July 2020. Midway through the season, the show was renewed for a thirteenth season (the second with 7) on 28 June 2020; once again, the season was prerecorded and aired in late 2020 and aired from 26 April to 29 June 2021.

In October 2021, the series was confirmed to return for a fourteenth overall season. In celebration of Big Brother Australia's twenty-first anniversary, the season featured former housemates from all eras of the show returning to compete against new housemates. Filmed in late 2021, the season aired from 9 May to 12 July 2022.

A fifteenth season was announced in October 2022. Initially teased as Big Brother: House of Love due to the intentional casting of young, attractive single people, criticism of the show trying to imitate Love Island led to the network dropping the title. Pre-recorded in its entirety in late 2022, the season premiered over a year later, running from 6 November to 6 December 2023. Harshly reviewed by critics and viewers alike due to its pivot to a dating show instead of a social experiment and the lack of diverse casting and LGBT+ participants, the show rated poorly. As a result, a planned sixteenth season that was announced for 2024 was rescinded. While the show was not officially cancelled prior to the October announcement of the show leaving the network, Seven confirmed there would be no 2024 edition of the show.

Prior to the start of season 14, a second celebrity edition was also confirmed. Pre-recorded in its entirety from July to August 2021, the season aired from 1 to 23 November 2021. Though a second edition (third celebrity season of the format overall) was announced in October 2021, following the season's poor ratings, it was announced in February 2022 that the series was "not proceeding".

=== Second Network 10 iteration (2025–present) ===
On 16 September 2024, it was confirmed that Big Brother would be returning to Network 10 for its sixteenth season in 2025, with comedian, Nova Melbourne announcer, and The Cheap Seats showbiz correspondent Mel Tracina announced as the new host. The promo advertising the return noted the series' return to its original format with 24-hour live streaming, live nominations and evictions and prominently featured footage from the original Network 10 iteration of the series. Although promoted as a return to the original format, the revival only partially restored the traditional live elements; the live format returned, but the show remained highly edited with producer-guided narratives instead of the looser, continuous style of the early years.

On 27 July 2025, it was confirmed that the series would return to Dreamworld with the new house constructed inside the Exhibition Centre; the original house had burned down in 2019 and the land later sold for development. In November 2025, Mike Goldman, who previously narrated the original Ten and Nine seasons, was announced to be returning to the show for the upcoming season.

The series premiered on 9 November 2025 and concluded on 8 December 2025.

The seventeenth season of Big Brother, premiered on 10 on 26 October 2026, with Tracina and Goldman both returning. Due to scheduling conflicts, production moved from Dreamworld to the Screen Queensland studios in Brisbane.

== Series details and viewership ==
Season	Episodes	Originally released			Days	Housemates	Winner	Runner(s)-up	Prize money	Average viewers (millions)
Season	Episodes	First released	Last released	Network	Days	Housemates	Winner	Runner(s)-up	Prize money	Average viewers (millions)
1	95	24 April 2001	16 July 2001	Ten	85	14	Ben Williams	Blair McDonough	$250,000	1.40
2	100	8 April 2002	1 July 2002	Ten	86	15	Peter Corbett	Nathan "Marty" Martin	$250,000	1.50
Celebrity	20	21 July 2002	12 August 2002	Ten	24	12	Dylan Lewis	Jay Laga'aia	$100,000 (for charity)	1.10
3	122	27 April 2003	21 July 2003	Ten	86	16	Regina Sorensen	Chrissie Swan	$250,000	1.70
4	109	2 May 2004	26 July 2004	Ten	86	16	Trevor Butler	Bree Amer	$1,000,000	1.50
5	141	8 May 2005	15 August 2005	Ten	100	20	Greg Mathew	Tim Brunero	$836,000	1.20
6	135	23 April 2006	31 July 2006	Ten	100	23	Jamie Brooksby	Camilla Severi	$426,000	1.30
7	129	22 April 2007	30 July 2007	Ten	100	24	Aleisha Cowcher	Zach Douglas	$450,000	1.07
8	112	28 April 2008	21 July 2008	Ten	85	20	Terri Munro	Rory Ammon	$250,000	0.86
9	89	13 August 2012	7 November 2012	Nine	87	16	Benjamin Norris	Layla Subritzky	$250,000	1.04
10	89	29 July 2013	6 November 2013	Nine	101	20	Tim Dormer	Jade Albany Pietrantonio	$250,000	0.89
11	56	8 September 2014	26 November 2014	Nine	80	22	Ryan Ginns	Travis Lunardi	$200,000	0.65
12	28	8 June 2020	22 July 2020	Seven	39	20	Chad Hurst	Sophie Budack and Daniel Gorringe	$234,656	0.83
13	31	26 April 2021	29 June 2021	Seven	63	26	Marley Biyendolo	Christina Podolyan and Sarah Jane "SJ" Adams	$250,000	0.66
VIP	11	1 November 2021	23 November 2021	Seven	22	12	Luke Toki	Ellie Gonsalves and Josh Carroll	$100,000 (for charity)	0.38
14	31	9 May 2022	12 July 2022	Seven	62	21	Reggie Sorensen	Johnson Ashak and Taras Hrubyj-Piper	$250,000	0.34
15	25	6 November 2023	6 December 2023	Seven	25	18	Tay and Ari Wilcoxson	Louis Phillips and Mineé Marx	$100,000	0.14
16	26	9 November 2025	8 December 2025	10	30	13	Coco Beeby	Emily Dale	$135,000	0.82
17	TBA	26 October 2026	TBA	10	TBA	17	TBA	TBA	$100,000	TBA

=== Host and Narrators ===
Person	Series																		
Person	1	2	Celebrity	3	4	5	6	7	8	9	10	11	12	13	VIP	14	15	16	17
Host
Gretel Killeen																			
Jackie O																			
Kyle Sandilands																			
Sonia Kruger																			
Mel Tracina																			
Narrator
Mike Goldman																			
Sonia Kruger																			

== Location ==
=== First house (2001–2014) ===
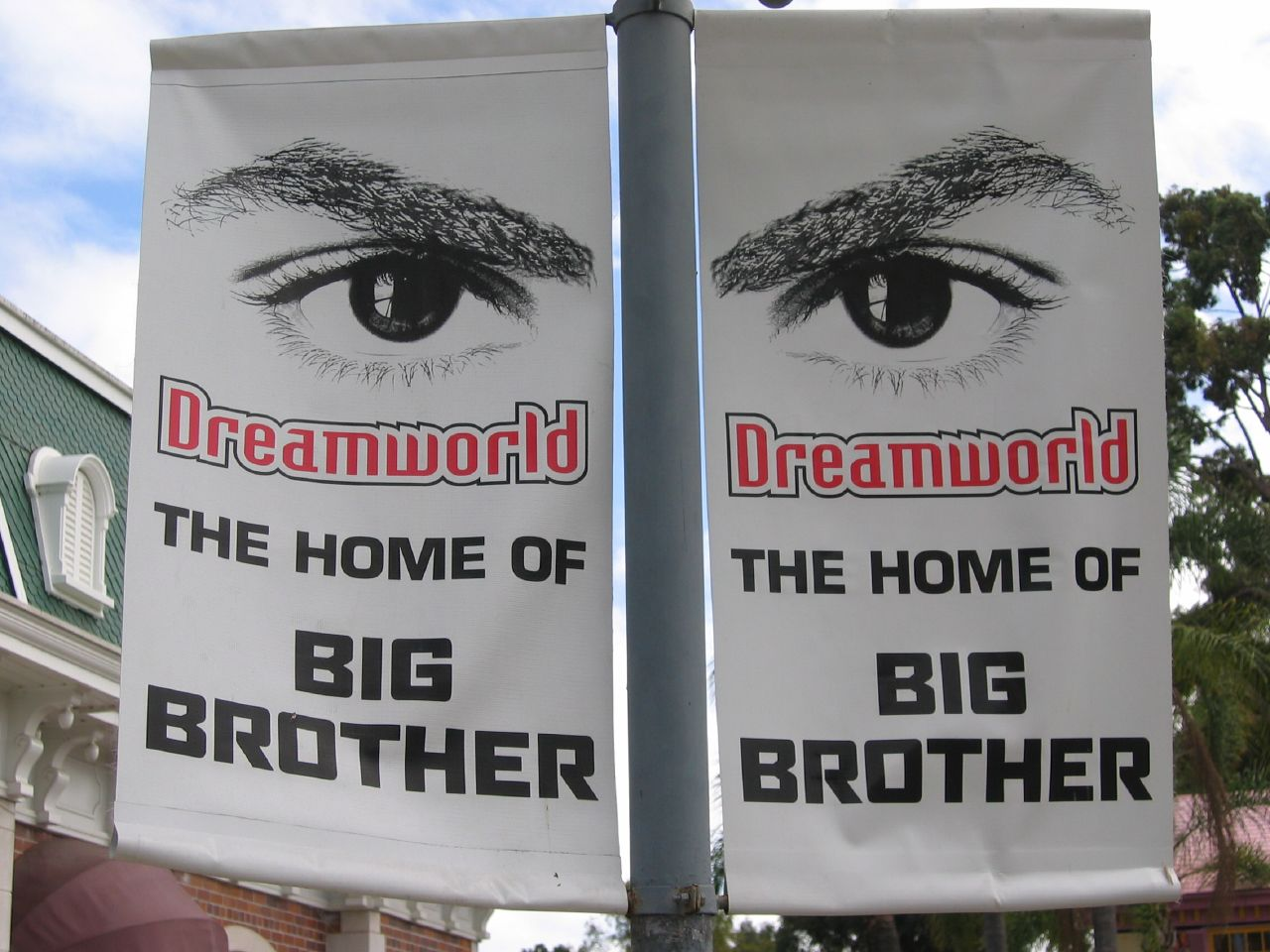
Banners advertising the show in Dreamworld's Main Street

The first Big Brother House was located at 27°51′32″S 153°18′53″E near Dreamworld, a theme park in Coomera, a northern suburb of the city of the Gold Coast, Queensland. The house was used for Ten and Nine's iteration of Big Brother. Footage from the house is monitored and edited in Dreamworld Studios. There is also an auditorium where the live audience shows, such as the eviction and finale episodes, were staged. The auditorium was an existing facility at Dreamworld used for live stage shows prior to the first series of Big Brother. It was leased to Endemol Southern Star for the duration of the series each year.

Only slight modifications were made to the interior of the house for the second series and the special Celebrity Big Brother Australia series that were screened in 2002. Subsequent to those series, the interior of the house has been rebuilt or extensively remodelled for each new series. Two separate houses were built for Big Brother 2003, and they were merged twenty-three days into the series when previously hidden connecting rooms were revealed. The fifth series introduced a Friday Night Live games arena. An animal enclosure was added to the side of the compound for the sixth series. It was retained for the seventh series.

During production on the series, visitors could access the Big Brother auditorium and view live footage from the house. This feature was, however, discontinued at the start of the ninth series.

=== Second house (2020–2021) ===
As the original house had burned down, Seven Network who previously produced and broadcast the series decided on a new location for the Big Brother House much closer to where production and crew members live. It has been understood the house has been built inside a warehouse which existed during World War II as an artillery shed, with a secondary building (previously used a gym) housing activities and challenges for the housemates. The exact location is 33°49′0″S 151°17′50″E next to the North Head Sanctuary Visitor Centre car park on Sydney Harbour's North Head near Manly. This house has since been pulled down following the 2021 season.

=== Third house (2021–2023) ===
The third Big Brother house was built at Sydney Olympic Park in the White Pavilion. The VIP edition was filmed at a newly built compound as well the main series since season 14 and fifteenth season.

Like the Dreamworld house, the Sydney Olympic Park House was available to be visited by the public during the Sydney Royal Easter Show in 2022, in promotion of the then-upcoming 14th season.

=== Fourth house (2025) ===
On 27 July 2025, it was confirmed that Big Brother would return to Dreamworld for Channel 10’s new series, with the new house situated in the Dreamworld Exhibition Centre. In addition, live shows will also come from a new studio set in Dreamworld right outside of the house.

Due to the house being located inside Dreamworld, this allowed patrons on certain rides to see into the house garden, with some overhead yelling to the housemates during episodes and live streams.

Following the conclusion of the 2025 season, the house was opened up for tours between 26 December 2025 - 11 January 2026.

=== Fifth house (2026) ===
Channel 10 has confirmed production of Big Brother will relocate from the Gold Coast to Brisbane for the upcoming 2026 season. The new house was built inside Screen Queensland Studios in Hemmant, Brisbane.

== Theme music ==
The theme music was adapted from the original theme used in the original Big Brother, which aired in the Netherlands. The theme for Big Brother Australia was written by Siew Ooi and 001 Productions in Melbourne. The track is an extended version of the main title theme used in the first two seasons of Big Brother Australia, and tracks heard throughout the seasons that followed are shorter, remixed versions of this track. The original track can sometimes be heard in the background when eviction votes, or the nomination tally in the Nominations show, are shown on screen, or when eviction phone numbers are during a show. In 2008, the theme music was retooled into an electric amplified remix, in counterpart of the format changes that were made that year. Four years later in the 2012 revival of the program, the original theme song returned with a futuristic remix. The theme song was completely absent from seasons that aired on Seven Network from 2020 to 2023. From 2025 onwards, the original theme song returned to the show with a remix, combining elements from the original theme music and later remixes in its original run.

The title theme was initially released as a single. The track was an extended mix of the main title theme used in the first two seasons and was released with an acoustic "Diary Room" mix and a more trance-influenced "Eviction" mix. It barely scraped in the top 50, but was re-released a few months later where it reached #12 on the ARIA charts in 2001 with a B-Side of The Sirens' hit "Don't You Think That It's Strange", which was also co-written by Big Brother 2001 housemates; the Diary Room mix; and an extended version of the Big Brother Uncut theme.

== International broadcasts ==
=== New Zealand ===
Between 2001 and 2003, as well during 2005, Big Brother Australia aired on TV2 in New Zealand. The show aired on Prime in 2004. Between 2001 and 2004, the show aired on a one-day delay from the Australian broadcast. As such New Zealand viewers had the ability to cast eviction votes to determine the weekly evictee, however this did not continue in 2005 as the show aired on a three-week delay long after voting in Australia had concluded.

The show returned to New Zealand, as part of the TV3 summer line-up in November 2013 with the tenth season of the show. The following eleventh season was also broadcast by TV3 in November 2014.

The show then returned to New Zealand and TV3, which has since rebranded as Three, with the Seven iteration of the show in June 2020. This marked the first time the show has aired in primetime in New Zealand since the conclusion of the 2004 season due to the network needing to fill a scheduling gap caused by the COVID-19 pandemic delaying The Block NZ's ninth season to 2021. On 14 July 2020, it was announced due to low ratings, the show would be moving into a later timeslot and would drop to airing two episodes per week.

The second season to air on Seven was broadcast online-only, via TVNZ OnDemand, starting 4 May 2021 with the first four episodes and each subsequent episodes being released within 48 hours of the Australian broadcast.

=== Finland ===
The 2020 edition of the show was also broadcast on Finnish streaming service Ruutu.fi from 6 December 2020, with two episodes airing every Sunday.

=== The Netherlands ===
Dutch broadcaster RTL revealed that they are going to broadcast Big Brother Australia from season 12 on RTL 5, starting from 9 April 2021, only one day after their Dutch-Flemish version ended. The broadcast would occur each weekday at 9:30 pm.

=== United States ===
In the United States, seasons 12 and 13 were added to Paramount+ on 16 February 2022.

=== United Kingdom ===
In the United Kingdom, the VIP series and the 2020 season were broadcast on E4, with episodes being released on the Channel 4 on-demand service.

=== India ===
In India, seasons 12, 13, 14 and 15 were added to the JioCinema streaming platform.

== Reception ==
=== Criticism and controversy ===
The series received some criticism from commentators and audiences for its sexual content. The series was occasionally referred to as "Big Brothel" in the press, in reference to the sexual content of the Uncut episode. Criticism was also voiced in the Australian Government, with one politician referring to it as "toxic television". Complaints about Uncut led to it being rebranded Big Brother: Adults Only for the 2006 season. Adults Only was cancelled early in the season due to continuing controversy.

In Big Brother Australia 2003, contestant Belinda Thorpe revealed the identity of her underage sister, who was facing trial for murder, during a live broadcast. The disclosure led to the immediate termination of the segment, attracted extensive media coverage, and sparked widespread public discussion and online debate regarding the legal and ethical issues surrounding the identification of minors involved in ongoing criminal proceedings, with the incident subsequently becoming known as "Belindagate".

=== Censorship and sexual content ===
After the 2005 series, complaints prompted the Australian Communications and Media Authority to launch an investigation into Big Brother: Uncut. The main complaint was that Network Ten had breached the industry code of practice by broadcasting footage that went past the maximum MA15+ rating for Australian commercial television.

The ACMA found Network Ten had breached the code on a number of occasions:

- The airing of housemate Michael massaging his penis on Gianna's back and hair, allegedly without her consent. Gretel Killeen later expressed her disapproval with Michael's indecent actions (BB 2005).
- Vesna Tosevska plucking her pubic hair in bed (BB 2005).
- A song about sexual fetishes (BB 2005).
- Tim hogtied and dumped in the diary room, where he was tackled and had his testicles hit with a leather strap (BB 2005).
- Airing of housemates Glenn Dallinger and Michelle Carew-Gibson appearing to have sex in a sauna (BB 2005).
- In the 2001 season, Big Brother Uncut received backlash for airing a "sex scene" between Peter Timbs and Christina Davis, though neither of the two were having sex, despite making rhythmic sexual movements under the bedsheets.
- A "bondage" party earlier in the 2001 season caused concerns when housemate Andrea Silva, a dominatrix in profession, displayed some of her sexual fetishes to the other housemates, where she tied up her shirtless male housemates, pinched their nipples and lashed them with a scourge.
- Later that night, Sara-Marie Fedele tied up Gordon Sloan on a wooden table and sensually stroked his bare chest.

The ACMA did not impose any direct punishment on Network Ten, however outlined requirements for the 2006 series of Uncut. Included in those requirements is a commitment by Network Ten to compile episode footage early enough for censors to evaluate it. Two censors were taken on by the network specifically for Big Brother, and crew were trained on the restrictions of the MA15+ television rating. As a result of criticism, the show was renamed Big Brother: Adults Only for the 2006 season.

The daily shows in the first 4 seasons were rated G, despite their (mild) sexual references or innuendos and adult subject matter. The daily shows in the latter seasons were rated PG. Late Night Feast, an adult-oriented show first aired in the 2013 season, was rated M for moderate sexual references, (non-graphic) nudity and coarse language.

==== 2006 alleged sexual assault controversy ====
On 1 July 2006 two housemates, Michael Cox (using the alias Ashley for the show) and Michael Bric (using the alias John), were removed from the house for allegedly sexually assaulting, "Turkey slapping" female housemate, Camilla Halliwell, in a season of the series that had already attracted significant controversy. Queensland Police were shown the relevant footage, but opted not to conduct a criminal investigation. Subsequent to this incident former housemate Rita Lazzarotto reported that she had been subjected to a similar incident during her time in the Big Brother house in the 2005 series.

Australian prime minister John Howard asked for Big Brother to be cancelled, saying, "Here's a great opportunity for Channel 10 to do a bit of self-regulation and get this stupid program off the air"; leader of the opposition Kim Beazley and senator Steve Fielding supported this view. Queensland premier Peter Beattie argued that the show employed many Australians in production and that, because of the already diminished size of the Australian television industry, the show should continue.

=== Housemate selection ===
The show's producers aim to get "real people" in the house. This has been done by personality testing, engaging with people around the country and appearances. While there are housemates who are "unique" and reflect many diverse people in Australia, there has been a high number of individuals in the latter seasons who come from a modelling background which has alienated them from the public audience.

In the 2007 season, to lower censorship controversies that stemmed from the housemates' generally salacious and revelling personality types from the previous seasons, producers selected more sophisticated, reserved and modest type of housemates, such as Rebecca Dent, a devout Mormon, and Jamie McDonald, a computer geek. Such practise of selecting more educated and mature type of people continued into the latter seasons, with other examples being Michael Beveridge from the 2012 season, who had the IQ of a genius, and Priya Malik, an Indian Australian schoolteacher with an English Honours degree from the 2014 season.

=== Awards and nominations ===
Year	Award	Category	Result	Ref
2002	Logie Awards	Most Popular Reality Program	Won	
2003	Logie Awards	Most Popular Reality Program	Nominated	
2004	Logie Awards	Most Popular Reality Program	Nominated	
2005	Logie Awards	Most Popular Reality Program	Nominated	
2006	Logie Awards	Most Popular Reality Program	Nominated	
2007	Logie Awards	Most Popular Reality Program	Nominated	
2008	Logie Awards	Most Popular Reality Program	Nominated	
2013	Logie Awards	Most Popular Reality Program	Nominated	
2014	Logie Awards	Most Popular Reality Program	Nominated	

== Other media ==
Since 2001, many home media iterations of Big Brother Australia have been produced, including books, magazines, music, games, VHS and DVDs.

=== VHS ===
Name	Release year	Distributor	Notes
The Best of Big Brother: The Official Video	2001	Warner Vision Australia	A 2-hour compilation featuring all the highlights from the first season of Big Brother Australia.

=== DVD ===
Name	Release year	Distributor	Notes
Big Brother: Unseen/Uncut/Unreel	2003	Columbia TriStar Home Entertainment	A collection of exclusive content, including never-before-seen footage, extended scenes and a comprehensive look at the making of Big Brother Australia.

=== Streaming ===
In August 2025, it was announced that full episodes of classic Big Brother Australia seasons will be digitised and officially released for the first time ever. As of November 2026, all seasons before the rebooted Network 10 season (except season 10, Big Brother VIP, and 15) are available on YouTube. In addition, the rebooted sixteenth season and seventeenth season of Big Brother Australia are also available on 10 after the initial broadcast.

Some of the seasons of the Channel 7 iteration (season 14 and 15) remain available on 7Plus.

=== Music ===
Name	Release year	Distributor	Notes
Big Brother Theme: The Single	2001	BMG Music Australia	Includes the theme song and two remixes, as well as "The Housemates Song (Don't You Think That It's Strange?)" which was recorded by the 2001 Housemates.
Big Brother: The Album	2001	BMG Music Australia	Includes compilation music featured in, and inspired by, the first season of Big Brother Australia.
Big Brother 2002	2002	BMG Music Australia	Includes compilation music featured in, and inspired by, the second season of Big Brother Australia.
Big Brother '07: Party Mix	2007	Universal Music Australia	Compilation album featuring various pop songs from the time of release. None of the music was featured on Big Brother Australia.

=== Other merchandise ===
Two official board games have been released. In 2001, "Big Brother Uncut" had players ask each other questions from one of four categories - Relationships, Romance, Fantasy & Desire - and guess which answer belonged to which player. While in 2002, the second official board game "Big Brother" had players ask each other questions from four different categories - Friendship, Romance, Scandal & True Colours. In both games, players nominate each other to be evicted. Just like in the TV show, votes are made in secret and then tallied when the last player passes the eviction point, which is about halfway around the board. The player with the most votes goes back to the beginning, while the first player to reach the final position wins the game.

During the 2002 season, an official Big Brother magazine was released, containing exclusive news, photos and interviews from the show. Only four editions were ever published.

An unofficial book titled Big Bother: Why Did That Reality TV Show Become Such a Phenomenon?, written by Toni Johnson-Woods, was also released in 2002. It was an in-depth analysis of the Big Brother phenomenon and a behind-the-scenes look at the groundbreaking first season in Australia, exploring the production of the show and of reality TV in general.

== Notable contestants ==
2001

- Rachel Corbett
- Sara-Marie Fedele
- Blair McDonough

2002

- Brodie Young

2003

- Regina Sorensen
- Chrissie Swan

2004

- Bree Amer
- Trevor Butler
- Wesley Dening
- Ryan Fitzgerald

2005

- Greg and David Mathew

2006

- Danielle Foote
- Krystal Forscutt

2008

- Craig Barnett
- Michael Crafter

2013

Tully Smyth

Tim Dormer

- Ed Lower

2014

Skye Wheatley

- Sam Bramham

2020

- Daniel Gorringe, (AFL player)

2021

- Nick Benton (cricketer)
- Jess Trend

2022

- Trevor Butler
- Regina Sorensen

== See also ==
- List of Australian television series

== Bibliography ==
- Johnson-woods, Toni (2002). Big Bother: Why Did That Reality TV Show Become Such a Phenomenon?. Australia: University of Queensland Press. p. 256. ISBN 0-7022-3315-3.
