= Regina Sorensen =

Australian television personality (born 1974)

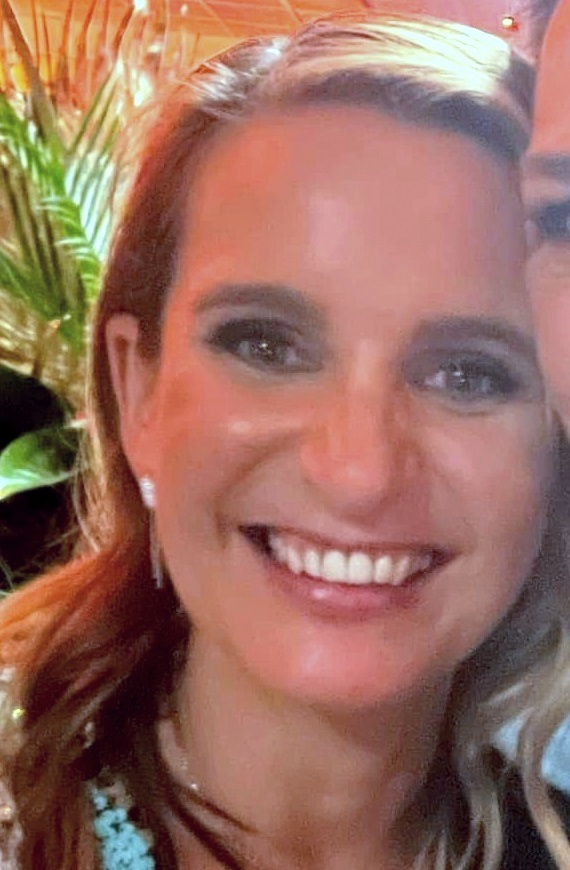
- Sorenson in 2022
- Born: Regina Jennifer Bingham; 19 March 1974 (age 52); Tasmania
- Other name: Reggie
- Occupation: TV personality
- Known for: Reality TV contestant

Regina Jennifer "Reggie" Sorensen (née Bingham; formerly Bird; born 19 March 1974) is an Australian television personality. She is best known for being a contestant on, and winning, the third and fourteenth seasons of Big Brother Australia in 2003 and 2022 respectively, and is the only Australian contestant to win twice.

Small in stature with a nasal intonation, she earned public admiration with her charm, strong work ethic, and naivety. She was the first Big Brother contestant to win twice (2003 and 2022 respectively). "Go Reggie" bumper stickers were a big hit in Tasmania in 2003.

Sorensen was included in Hobart newspaper The Mercury's list of "Tassie's Top 200" movers and shakers in 2007.

== Career ==
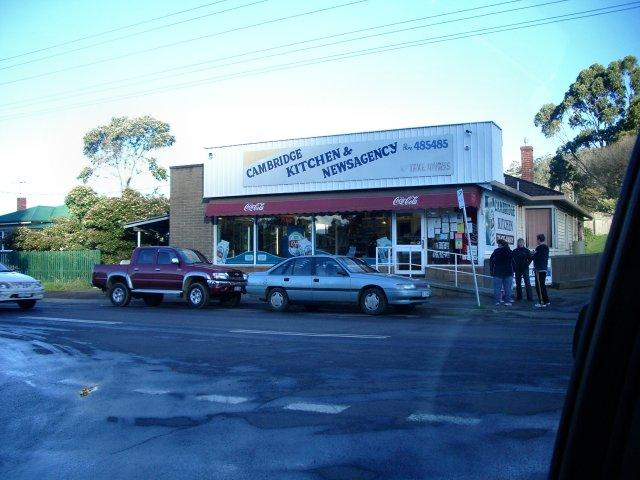
The fish and chip shop in Cambridge which Bird used to own

In late 2003, Sorensen signed up with manager Harry M. Miller and filmed a pilot for a TV show which never made it to air. Later she appeared as a contestant on 2005 Nine Network celebrity skating competition series Skating on Thin Ice. From December 2004 to May 2005, she worked for airline Virgin Blue as a flight attendant – her "dream job" – although she resigned claiming she had been bullied by her colleagues.

In 2025, Sorensen appeared as a contestant on the eleventh season of I'm a Celebrity...Get Me Out of Here!, where she ended up joint runner-up.

== Big Brother ==
In 2003, Sorensen won third season of Big Brother with 72% of the final vote, the biggest margin in a Big Brother finale to date, in addition to being the first female winner of the Australian show.

Sorensen was involved in the Week 12 task on season 9 of Big Brother in 2012, the show's comeback season on the Nine Network. She was one of several former housemates that entered the house to try to get the current housemates to fail their weekly task, which was to ignore everyone who entered the house that was not a housemate.

In 2022, Sorensen starred in a third network, the Seven Network's, iteration of Big Brother, Big Brother 14, as one of eight past housemates, in the mix with newly cast stars. She was one of three former winners to enter the house, alongside Big Brother 4 winner Trevor Butler and Big Brother 10 winner Tim Dormer. She was ultimately crowned the winner of Big Brother for a second time, where she spent a total of 148 days in the house (in both seasons). She became the fifth contestant in the world to win the show twice and the first person to do so in Big Brother Australia, also she was the first female winner of Big Brother since Terri Munro won the eighth and final season on Network Ten in 2008.

== Personal life ==
Before appearing in Big Brother in 2003, Bird and her husband Adrian managed a fish and chip shop in Cambridge, Tasmania. Their marriage ended shortly after the season finale.

She spent some time residing in Sydney and later Melbourne. She now lives in Queensland. In 2007, she gave birth to her first child, a daughter with her second husband, Dale Sorensen. In 2009, she gave birth to a son, who was diagnosed with cystic fibrosis at four weeks old.

In 2005, Bird lost $40,000 to a conman who claimed to be a television producer where she paid him the money to fund the pilot of a travel show she would appear in. She has also been a victim of stalking.

=== Health ===
In 2008 she underwent emergency surgery arising from an ectopic pregnancy and was also declared legally blind after having been diagnosed with a degenerative eye condition, retinitis pigmentosa, a rare hereditary eye disease that may lead to blindness. She had lost 90% of her central vision. About her condition, she states "I've now lost all of my peripheral vision, I have no night vision. I could wake up tomorrow and it's going to be gone".

She was interviewed by 60 Minutes in July 2009, during which she discussed her ongoing degenerative eye condition and her second child due in August 2009. She has also appeared on The Daily Edition in 2016 to discuss her illness.

In 2017, Sorensen suffered from a stroke caused by a heart condition.

== Filmography ==
=== Television ===
Year	Title	Role	Notes
2003	Big Brother (Australian TV series)	Housemate	Season 3 Winner
2022	Big Brother (Australian TV series)	Housemate	Season 14 Winner
2025	I'm a Celebrity...Get Me Out of Here! (Australian TV series)	Contestant	Season 11 Runner-up

Preceded by Peter Corbett	Big Brother Australia winner Series 3 (2003)	Succeeded by Trevor Butler

Preceded by Marley Biyendolo	Big Brother Australia winner Series 14 (2022)	Succeeded by Tay & Ari Wilcoxson
