= Trevor Butler =

Australian Big Brother winner (born c. 1973)

- Born: c. 1973 (age 52–53); Fiji
- Other name: Big Trev
- Occupations: Radio and TV personality
- Known for: Big Brother Australia contestant and winner; Big Brother Australia 2022 contestant; First winner of the Australian series to be awarded the $1 million prize

Trevor Butler is a Fijian-Australian TV personality, best known for being a contestant and winner of Big Brother Australia series 4 (airing in 2004). He known for being the first, and currently only, contestant to win the million-dollar prize, as opposed to previous seasons when the prize money was $250,000. The amount is also the highest amount of prize money awarded in Australian game show history, making Butler one of the highest paid Australian TV personalities.

Butler also boosted interest in the final eviction night by proposing to his then-girlfriend Breea Forrest live on the eviction stage.

There was some controversy regarding how much of his winnings could be claimed as tax. At one point the Australian Taxation Office (ATO) considered it to be payment for spending the time in the house, and therefore wanted to take nearly half of the winnings away. The ATO eventually gave in and did not take the money.

Butler returned as a contestant for Big Brother 14 alongside other previous contestants.

== Biography ==
Butler was born in c. 1973 on the Pacific Island nation of Fiji, and lived most of his life in Broken Hill, New South Wales, before appearing in Big Brother.

Butler was one of seven celebrities to feature in a television program named Celebrity Overhaul. The program aired in February and March 2005. All five episodes won the highest audience numbers for the Sunday 6:30 p.m. timeslot. Butler lost 15 kg.

Butler appeared in episode 6 of Summer Heights High as a special guest on "Polynesian Cultural Appreciation Day".

Butler currently works for the Gold Coast Radio Station 102.9 Hot Tomato.

Butler and his wife Breea, live in Tweed Heads in far north New South Wales. On 11 October 2007, Breea gave birth to their first child, a boy named Maika Jeremy Butler. On 31 December 2010, Breea gave birth to their second son, Creedance Heath Butler.

Known as Big Trev, he works on the Drive Home Show alongside Moyra Major on Hot Tomato.

In 2022, Trevor returned for Big Brother 14 as one of eight returning housemates. Butler was one of three former winners to enter the house, alongside Big Brother 3 winner Regina Bird and Big Brother 10 winner Tim Dorner. He was the sixth housemate to be evicted, finishing in 16th place.

Preceded by Regina Bird	Big Brother Australia winner Series 4 (2004)	Succeeded by Greg Mathew
