= Big Brother (Australian TV series) season 15 =

Big Brother
- Season 15
- Presented by: Sonia Kruger
- No. of days: 25
- No. of housemates: 18
- Winners: Tay & Ari Wilcoxson
- Runners-up: Louis Phillips; Mineé Marx
- Companion show: Big Brother Uncut
- No. of episodes: 25

Release
- Original network: Seven Network
- Original release: 6 November – 6 December 2023

Additional information
- Filming dates: 31 October – 24 November 2022

Series chronology
- ← Previous; Season 14 Next → Season 16

The fifteenth season of the Australian reality television series Big Brother, also known as Big Brother 2023, began airing on 6 November 2023 on Seven Network. Sonia Kruger returned as the host of the show. The series was initially teased as Big Brother: House of Love and featured a younger cast consisting of single housemates.

On 6 December 2023 Tay & Ari Wilcoxson won the series becoming the second joint-housemate winners in the history of the Australian version of Big Brother, after the Logan twins won season 5.

This was the last season to air on Seven Network before the rights were reacquired by Network 10.

== Production ==
In October 2022 Seven Network announced that Big Brother would return for a fifteenth season. It was initially given the title Big Brother: House of Love and was teased to feature "a younger cast of sexy singles looking for love". The format was criticised on social media by viewers who said [the show] really needed to go back to the old Big Brother [format]". The series was again pre-recorded, and filming began on 31 October 2022. Following the criticism, the "House of Love" title was dropped, and after the conclusion of filming Seven Network described the series as the "spiciest yet" and a "more stripped-back, traditional Big Brother, where the cast is younger". It was also confirmed that the spin-off show Big Brother Uncut would return after seventeen years, having last aired during the sixth season. The season ran for 25 days, the shortest civilian season in Big Brother Australia history.

The season ended in a pre-recorded finale, similar to Big Brother VIP, where three possible endings were filmed for each of the finalist ahead of time with the outcome of Australia's vote determining which was broadcast.

=== International broadcast ===
The season aired in New Zealand, with episodes being made available via TVNZ+ the day after their broadcast in Australia. The Uncut episodes were not made available.

=== Controversy ===
The fifteenth season faced widespread backlash from viewers and long-time fans due to a major shift in format and casting. The season heavily emphasized dating and romantic interactions, featuring a cast primarily made up of young, model-like contestants. This pivot drew criticism for abandoning the show's traditional "social experiment" format in favour of a reality dating show aesthetic. Many fans accused the show of "selling out" and trying to imitate programs like Love Island, sacrificing the quirky, diverse personalities that had defined earlier seasons. The season recorded the lowest premiere ratings in Big Brother Australia history, with just 274,000 metro viewers tuning in, and was later moved to a later time slot due to poor performance. The finale fared even worse, drawing only 152,000 overnight viewers. As a result, the franchise was placed on hiatus, and the planned 2024 season was quietly scrapped. In 2024, Network 10 announced it had plans to revive Big Brother with the original format that focused more on social dynamics and public voting. This led to Channel Seven issuing a legal letter to Channel 10, as the network held the rights to Big Brother until mid-2025. Channel 10's version is slated to return in November 2025.

== Housemates ==
The housemates were revealed in October 2023 and were described by Seven Network as the "sexiest housemates in Australia".

Name	Age on entry	Hometown	Day entered	Day exited	Result
Taylor "Tay" & Ariana "Ari" Wilcoxson	23 & 20	Gold Coast, Queensland	1	25	Winners
Louis Phillips	23	Melbourne, Victoria	1	25	Runner-up
Mineé Marx	22	Perth, Western Australia	1	25	Runner-up
Taylah Davies	27	Bendigo, Victoria	1	24	Evicted
Josh Everett	28	Sydney, New South Wales	1	23	Evicted
Dion Prasad	26	Melbourne, Victoria	1	22	Evicted
Lewis Beers	26	Melbourne, Victoria	1	22	Evicted
Graciemae Sinclair	26	Sydney, New South Wales	1	19	Evicted
Teejay Halkias	26	Brisbane, Queensland	5	19	Evicted
Oli Walton	24	Perth, Western Australia	11	16	Evicted
Jake Vella	25	Melbourne, Victoria	1	15	Evicted
Maddi-Rose McGuire	19	Newport, New South Wales	11	15	Walked
Isabella "Bella" Sommers	25	Melbourne, Victoria	5	12	Evicted
Zach Davis	22	Colac, Victoria	1	9	Evicted
Luke Hallinan	33	Sydney, New South Wales	1	9	Evicted
Annelise Drake	24	Gold Coast, Queensland	1	7	Evicted
AnnaSophia Lambrou	30	Sydney, New South Wales	1	5	Evicted
Quan Ja	33	Melbourne, Victoria	1	3	Evicted

=== Further appearances ===
In 2025, Tay Wilcoxson competed on the American MTV series The Challenge: Vets & New Threats.

Teejay Halkias appeared on Married at First Sight.

== King and Queen of the House ==
Introduced on Day 2 was the title of "King and Queen of the House". The house will elect a King and a Queen, who will have access to the Suite.

Week	King	Queen
1	Josh	Tay
2	Teejay	Bella
3	Louis	Mineé
4	Lewis	Graciemae
5	Josh	Tay

== Episodes ==
No. overall	No. in season	Title	Day(s)	Original release date	Australian viewers
Week 1
1617	1	Episode 1	Days 1–2	6 November 2023	274,000
1618	2	Episode 2	Day 3	7 November 2023	213,000
1619	3	Episode 3	Days 3–4	8 November 2023	212,000
1620	4	Episode 4	Days 5–6	9 November 2023	183,000
1621	5	Episode 5 – Uncut	Days 1–6	9 November 2023	N/A
Week 2
1622	6	Episode 6	Days 6–7	13 November 2023	156,000
1623	7	Episode 7	Day 8	14 November 2023	130,000
1624	8	Episode 8	Day 9	15 November 2023	112,000
1625	9	Episode 9	Days 10–11	15 November 2023	86,000
1626	10	Episode 10 – Uncut	Days 7–11	16 November 2023	N/A
Week 3
1627	11	Episode 11	Days 11–13	20 November 2023	134,000
1628	12	Episode 12	Day 14	21 November 2023	128,000
1629	13	Episode 13	Day 15	22 November 2023	121,000
1630	14	Episode 14	Day 16	22 November 2023	91,000
1631	15	Episode 15 – Uncut	Days 11–15	23 November 2023	N/A
Week 4
1632	16	Episode 16	Days 16–17	27 November 2023	169,000
1633	17	Episode 17	Days 17–18	28 November 2023	134,000
1634	18	Episode 18	Day 19	29 November 2023	138,000
1635	19	Episode 19	Days 21–22	29 November 2023	97,000
1636	20	Episode 20 – Uncut	Days 16–19	30 November 2023	N/A
Week 5 – Grand Final Week
1637	21	Episode 21	Day 22	4 December 2023	135,000
1638	22	Episode 22	Days 22–23	4 December 2023	96,000
1639	23	Episode 23 – Top 3 Reveal	Day 24	5 December 2023	142,000
1640	24	Episode 24 – Uncut	Day 1–24	5 December 2023	N/A
1641	25	Episode 25 – Finale	Day 25	6 December 2023	152,000

== Voting history ==
Key
This housemate was nominated for eviction.
This housemate was the nominating Housemate on this round.
This housemate was immune from this round of eviction due to a twist.
This housemate won the challenge and is immune for this round of eviction.
This housemate was originally nominated but won a second chance and was thus saved from eviction.

	Week 1			Week 2			Week 3				Week 4				Week 5			
Episode	2	3	4	6	7	8	11	12	13	14	16	17	18		21	22	23	Finale
Challenge Winner(s)	Luke	(none)	Annelise	Graciemae; Luke	(none)		Tay & Ari	(none)			Josh; Tay & Ari	(none)			Mineé	Mineé	Louis	(none)
Against House Vote	Jake; Quan; Zach	All Housemates	AnnaSophia; Zach	Annelise; Josh; Louis	All Housemates	Bella; Luke; ~~Taylah~~; Zach	Bella; Jake; Taylah	All Housemates	Jake; ~~Maddi-Rose~~; Oli; Teejay	Oli; Teejay	Graciemae; Mineé; Taylah	All Housemates	Dion; Taylah; Teejay	Graciemae; Mineé	Dion; Josh; Lewis	Josh; Tay & Ari; Taylah	Mineé; Tay & Ari; Taylah	(none)
Vote to:	Evict	Nominate	Evict		Nominate	Evict		Nominate	Evict			Nominate	Evict					Win
Tay & Ari	Quan	AnnaSophia	AnnaSophia	Annelise	Bella; Luke	Luke	Nominating; Housemate	Jake	Jake	Oli	Nominating; Housemate	Teejay	Taylah	Not eligible	Lewis	Taylah	Nominated	Winners (Day 25)
Louis	Quan	N/A	AnnaSophia	Annelise	Luke; Zach	Luke	Bella	Maddi-Rose; Oli	Oli	Oli	Graciemae	Dion	Dion	Mineé (to stay)	Dion	Josh	Taylah	Runner-up (Day 25)
Mineé	Zach	AnnaSophia	AnnaSophia	Annelise	Luke; Zach	Luke	Bella	N/A	Jake	Teejay	Graciemae	In Half; House	Teejay	Nominated	Nominating; Housemate	Josh	Nominated	Runner-up (Day 25)
Taylah	Zach	N/A	Zach	Josh	Luke	In BB; Speakeasy	Jake	N/A	Jake	Oli	Mineé	Teejay; Tay & Ari	Teejay	Not eligible	Josh	Josh	Nominated	Evicted (Day 24)
Josh	Quan	Mineé	AnnaSophia	Annelise	Luke; Taylah	Luke	Jake	Oli	Oli	Oli	Nominating; Housemate	Teejay	Teejay	Not eligible	Lewis	Taylah	Evicted (Day 23)	
Dion	Zach	Annelise	AnnaSophia	Louis	Luke; Mineé	In BB; Speakeasy	Bella	Oli	Jake	Oli	Graciemae	Louis	Teejay	Not eligible	Lewis	Evicted (Day 22)		
Lewis	Zach	N/A	AnnaSophia	Annelise	Luke	Luke	Bella	N/A	Oli	Oli	Mineé	Dion	Dion	Graciemae (to evict)	Dion	Evicted (Day 22)		
Graciemae	Quan	Louis; Annelise	AnnaSophia	Nominating; Housemate	Luke	Luke	Bella	N/A	Jake	Oli	Mineé	In Half; House	Teejay	Nominated	Evicted (Day 19)			
Teejay	Not in House			Annelise	Luke; Taylah	Luke	Jake	Jake	Oli	Nominated	Graciemae	Dion; Taylah	Dion	Evicted (Day 19)				
Oli	Not in House						Bella	Teejay	Jake	Nominated	Evicted (Day 16)							
Jake	Quan	Taylah	AnnaSophia	Annelise	Luke	Luke	Taylah	Teejay	Oli	Evicted (Day 15)								
Maddi-Rose	Not in House						Bella	N/A	Nominated	Walked (Day 15)								
Bella	Not in House			Josh	Luke	Luke	Jake	Evicted (Day 12)										
Zach	Quan	N/A	Nominated	Annelise	Luke	Luke	Evicted (Day 9)											
Luke	Nominating; Housemate	Zach	AnnaSophia	Nominating; Housemate	Louis	Zach	Evicted (Day 9)											
Annelise	Quan	Zach	AnnaSophia	Louis	Evicted (Day 7)													
AnnaSophia	Jake	Louis	Nominated	Evicted (Day 5)														
Quan	Zach	Evicted (Day 3)																
Notes	(Note: On Day 2, Annelise, Lewis, Louis, and Luke were still left in the BB Express by housemates in the main house. Only these four forgotten housemates were eligible to compete in the first Nominations Challenge.)	(Note: On Day 4, housemates participated in House Nominations, with all housemates voting for two Housemates to be nominated for the next Eviction. The three Housemates with the most votes are nominated for eviction.)	(Note: On Day 5, Big Brother offered the three nominated housemates a chance to save themselves by taking the offer. Annelise choose the offer and saved herself from Eviction. In return, Big Brother took away all the clothes of rest of the housemates.)	(Note: This was a Pairs Challenge. The winning pair had to agree on nominations.) (Note: As new housemates Bella and Teejay were immune and couldn't be nominated.)	(Note: On Day 8, housemates participated in House Nominations, with all housemates voting for two Housemates to be nominated for the next Eviction. The four Housemates with the most votes are nominated for eviction.)	(Note: On Day 8, Dion could choose to save one of the nominees. He saved Taylah.) (Note: This round was a double eviction and two housemates with the most votes were evicted.)	none	(Note: On Day 14, housemates participated in House Nominations, with all housemates voting for two Housemates to be nominated for the next Eviction. The four Housemates with the most votes are nominated for eviction.)	(Note: On Day 15, Maddi-Rose decided to leave the house.) (Note: On Day 15, a sudden snap eviction took place, resulting in Jake to be evicted. Oli and Teejay faced another eviction on Day 16.)		(Note: On Day 17, the male housemates had to choose a random ball from the box, Teejay got the black ball and had to sit out from the Nominations Challenge and Big Brother gave him immunity.) (Note: On Day 17, Graciemae and Mineé were Fake Evicted and sent to the Half House.)	(Note: On Day 18, as Graciemae and Mineé were in the Half House, they were not eligible to nominate.)	(Note: On Day 19, as Graciemae and Mineé were in the Half House, they each got a half vote. They mutually had to vote for one housemate.)	(Note: On Day 19, Graciemae chose Lewis and Mineé chose Louis, who had to decide if they would take 5000 dollars cash or their partner from the Half House.)		none	(Note: The winner of the Final Challenge won a place in the Final 3 and the sole vote at the Final Eviction. The other housemates were nominated for the Final Eviction.)	(Note: For the finale, Australia voted for the winner of "Big Brother Australia 15" and the $100,000 grand prize.)
Walked	none								Maddi-Rose	none								
Vote Outcome	Quan; 7 of 13 votes to evict	Zach; 7 nominations	AnnaSophia; 10 of 11 votes to evict	Annelise; 8 of 12 votes to evict	Luke; 12 nominations	Luke; 10 of 11 votes to evict	Bella; 7 of 12 votes to evict	Maddi-Rose; 8 nominations	Jake; 6 of 11 votes to evict	Oli; 7 of 8 votes to evict	Graciemae; 4 of 7 votes to fake evict	Dion; 4 nominations	Teejay; 4 of 8 votes to evict	Graciemae; Lewis's choice to evict	Lewis; 3 of 6 votes to evict	Josh; 3 of 5 votes to evict	Taylah; Louis's choice to evict	Louis; Fewest votes to win
Vote Outcome	Quan; 7 of 13 votes to evict	AnnaSophia; 5 nominations	AnnaSophia; 10 of 11 votes to evict	Annelise; 8 of 12 votes to evict	Taylah; Zach; 4 nominations	Luke; 10 of 11 votes to evict	Bella; 7 of 12 votes to evict	Oli; 6 nominations	Jake; 6 of 11 votes to evict	Oli; 7 of 8 votes to evict	Graciemae; 4 of 7 votes to fake evict	Taylah; 4 nominations	Teejay; 4 of 8 votes to evict	Graciemae; Lewis's choice to evict	Lewis; 3 of 6 votes to evict	Josh; 3 of 5 votes to evict	Taylah; Louis's choice to evict	Louis; Fewest votes to win
Vote Outcome	Quan; 7 of 13 votes to evict	AnnaSophia; 5 nominations	AnnaSophia; 10 of 11 votes to evict	Annelise; 8 of 12 votes to evict	Taylah; Zach; 4 nominations	Zach; 1 of 11 votes to evict	Bella; 7 of 12 votes to evict	Jake; 5 nominations	Jake; 6 of 11 votes to evict	Oli; 7 of 8 votes to evict	Mineé; 3 of 7 votes to fake evict	Taylah; 4 nominations	Teejay; 4 of 8 votes to evict	Graciemae; Lewis's choice to evict	Dion; 2 of 6 votes to evict	Josh; 3 of 5 votes to evict	Taylah; Louis's choice to evict	Mineé; Fewest votes to win
Vote Outcome	Quan; 7 of 13 votes to evict	Annelise; 5 nominations	AnnaSophia; 10 of 11 votes to evict	Annelise; 8 of 12 votes to evict	Bella; 3 nominations	Zach; 1 of 11 votes to evict	Bella; 7 of 12 votes to evict	Teejay; 2 nominations	Jake; 6 of 11 votes to evict	Oli; 7 of 8 votes to evict	Mineé; 3 of 7 votes to fake evict	Teejay; 4 nominations	Teejay; 4 of 8 votes to evict	Graciemae; Lewis's choice to evict	Dion; 2 of 6 votes to evict	Josh; 3 of 5 votes to evict	Taylah; Louis's choice to evict	Mineé; Fewest votes to win
Vote Outcome	Zach; 5 of 13 votes	Mineé; 3 nominations	Zach; 1 of 11 votes	Josh; 2 of 12 votes	Louis; Mineé; Teejay; 1 nomination each	Bella; 0 of 11 votes	Jake; 4 of 12 votes	N/A; 1 nomination each	Oli; 5 of 11 votes	Teejay; 1 of 8 votes	Taylah; 0 of 7 votes to fake evict	N/A; 1 nomination each	Dion; 3 of 8 votes	Mineé; Louis's choice to stay	Josh; 1 of 6 votes	Taylah 2 of 5 votes	Mineé; Louis's choice to stay	Tay & Ari; Most votes to win
Vote Outcome	Zach; 5 of 13 votes	Louis; 2 nominations	Zach; 1 of 11 votes	Josh; 2 of 12 votes	Louis; Mineé; Teejay; 1 nomination each	Bella; 0 of 11 votes	Jake; 4 of 12 votes	N/A; 1 nomination each	Oli; 5 of 11 votes	Teejay; 1 of 8 votes	Taylah; 0 of 7 votes to fake evict	N/A; 1 nomination each	Dion; 3 of 8 votes	Mineé; Louis's choice to stay	Josh; 1 of 6 votes	Taylah 2 of 5 votes	Mineé; Louis's choice to stay	Tay & Ari; Most votes to win
Vote Outcome	Jake; 1 of 13 votes	Jake; Lewis; Luke; Taylah; 1 nomination each	Zach; 1 of 11 votes	Louis; 2 of 12 votes	Louis; Mineé; Teejay; 1 nomination each	Bella; 0 of 11 votes	Taylah; 1 of 12 votes	N/A; 1 nomination each	Teejay; 0 of 11 votes	Teejay; 1 of 8 votes	Taylah; 0 of 7 votes to fake evict	N/A; 1 nomination each	Taylah; 1 of 8 votes	Mineé; Louis's choice to stay	Josh; 1 of 6 votes	Tay & Ari; 0 of 5 votes	Tay & Ari; Louis's choice to stay	Tay & Ari; Most votes to win

== Reception ==
=== Viewership ===
This season returned with 274,000 metro viewers, which is half the viewers of last season premiere of 487,000. The second episode fared no better with only 213,000 viewers and losing another thousand viewers in episode three at 212,000. By the fourth episode, the season had dropped almost half of its premiere viewers with only 183,000. Due to low viewership, subsequent episodes were moved from 7:30 to the 8:30 timeslot from 13 November, with a double episode on the 15th. The season finale drew 152,000 viewers, down from season 14's 363,000 viewers.

=== Criticism ===
This season of Big Brother has been negatively received by viewers saying it resembles more a dating show than a social experiment. In particular, the season was unfavourablebly compared to Love Island, Married at First Sight, and the concurrently airing reboot of the British version. Criticism was also pointed to the lack of diversity – including the few People of Colour and the lack of LGBT participants.
