= Big Brother (Australian TV series) season 14 =

Big Brother
- Season 14
- Presented by: Sonia Kruger
- No. of days: 62
- No. of housemates: 21
- Winner: Reggie Sorensen
- Runners-up: Johnson Ashak; Taras Hrubyj-Piper
- No. of episodes: 31

Release
- Original network: Seven Network
- Original release: 9 May – 12 July 2022

Additional information
- Filming dates: 12 October – 13 December 2021

Season chronology
- ← Previous; Season 13 Next → Season 15

The fourteenth season of the Australian reality television series Big Brother, also known as Big Brother 2022, was filmed from 12 October through 13 December 2021, and premiered on Seven Network on 9 May 2022. Hosted by Sonia Kruger,

In the series, the Housemates – both new and returning housemates from earlier seasons deemed as "Big Brother Royalty" – lived in a house together with no communication with the outside world as they compete for $250,000. They were constantly filmed during their time in the house and were not permitted to communicate with those filming them. Over the course of the competition, housemates will compete in challenges for power and safety before voting each other out of the house. When three housemates remained, the Australian public decided which finalist would win the grand prize of $250,000.

The series was won by season 3 winner Reggie Sorensen, who was voted the winner by Australia over Johnson Ashak and Taras Hrubyj-Piper. With her win, Sorensen became the first person to win the Australian adaptation of the show twice, and the fifth worldwide. The season finale was aired on 12 July 2022, with 363 thousand viewers tuning in.

== Production ==
In October 2021, Seven Network released a promotional teaser for the season with the slogan "Back to the Future," revealing that former housemates from previous seasons of Big Brother would return to compete against new housemates. The season was filmed at the White Pavilion in Sydney Olympic Park, the same location as Big Brother VIP, making it the first civilian season to be filmed in the new location, following the demolition of the previous house in January 2021.

The finale was broadcast live from the Hordern Pavilion with all housemates in attendance – which will be the first time since moving to Seven that the show has reunited the full cast due to previous seasons having issues with COVID-19 restrictions in Sydney.

=== International broadcast ===
The season is being broadcast in New Zealand via TVNZ Ondemand the day after the episode first airs in Australia, and is then being broadcast on one of TVNZ's linear channels the day after that. The season was originally being broadcast on TVNZ 2, but following poor ratings it was moved to TVNZ Duke airing at mid-day from May 25.

== Format ==
The fourteenth season aired three nights a week from Monday to Wednesday. Each week, two Housemates were typically Evicted. For the first time since the 2020 revival, significant additions were made to the Big Brother game structure.

Each episode takes place over 2–3-day of the game, showcasing highlights from the house and house tasks (to determine the weekly shopping budget and award various luxuries) and the Nomination and Eviction process. Regarding the nomination and eviction process, each night features a different episode format. While some episodes modify the format slightly – usually to feature a twist to the game – the typical episode structure is as follows:

- Monday: The Housemates compete in a Nomination Challenge, the winner of which has power over the next set of Nominations. Immediately after the challenge, the winner will be called to the Diary Room to name three nominees for that Night's Eviction Ceremony. At the Eviction Ceremony all housemates must vote to evict one of the nominees, except the nominating housemate (who will only cast a tie-breaker vote, if required). The nominee with the most votes is evicted from the house.
- Tuesday: The housemates compete in an Immunity Challenge, the winner is immune from the next set of Nominations and Eviction. Then the House will vote in House Nominations, with all housemates voting for one Housemate to be nominated for the next Eviction. The three Housemates with the most votes are nominated for eviction. In the event of a tie, the Immunity winner will break the tie to determine three nominees.
- Wednesday: The Housemates nominated by the house compete in the Second Chance Challenge, with the winner saving themself from that night's Eviction. At the Eviction Ceremony all housemates must vote to evict one of the two remaining nominees, except the nominees themselves (as their votes would cancel the other's out). In the event of a tie, the Head of House will break the tie. The nominee with the most votes is evicted from the house.

=== Finale ===
Following the final eviction, the remaining three housemates will face Australia's vote to determine the winner. This vote is conducted on the show's website, with voters voting for a winner, with the finalist with the most votes winning.

== Head of House ==
Introduced in Week 2 was the title of "Head of House". The house will elect an HoH, who will be given total immunity for the week and access to the HOH Suite along with two/three housemates of their choice. They were also granted a unique game power to use during their reign. No Housemate can be Head of House in back to back weeks.

Week	HoH	HoH's choice for Suite Access	Power	Outcome
2	Tully (Note: Tully was made HoH by Big Brother upon her entrance into the house.)	Drew; Tim	At House Nominations, Tully could give Immunity to one Housemate. This was awarded after votes were cast and before they were revealed.	Tully gave Trevor Immunity, cancelling 2 nomination votes against him.
3	Aleisha	Gabbie; Lulu	At House Nominations, Aleisha was given 3 nomination votes.	Aleisha cast a vote against Estelle and 2 votes against Dave.
4	Jules (Note: The house only had the option to elect either one of the intruders (Jules or Brenton) as HoH.)	Dave; Estelle; Tully	At the first Nominations Challenge of the week, Jules could choose one Housemate to sit out. This Housemate couldn't win the power to nominate, but could still be nominated.	Jules chose for Drew to sit out of the Nominations Challenge.
5	Estelle	Brenton; Johnson	After the house nomination was revealed, Estelle could choose to save one of the nominated housemate from eviction and replace with another housemate of her choice.	Estelle saved Tully, cancelling 3 nomination votes against her, and replace her spot with Aleisha.
6	Johnson	Jaycee; Reggie	Before the Immunity Challenge, Johnson could banish two of his fellow housemates to the waiting room and are not able to participate in the challenge.	Johnson banished Brenton and Tim to the waiting room, which prevented them from participating in the Nominations Challenge and was saved from the House Nominations.
7	Jaycee	Not shown	Not shown	Not shown
8	Tim (Note: For being chosen as the "Unlucky Four", only Aleisha, Reggie, Taras or Tim are eligible to become the final Head of House, where those 4 will have to come up with a unanimous decision. At the end, Tim was selected to be the HoH)	Aleisha (Note: Tim has won a HoH suite visitor pass during the house task, and he has decided to give it to Aleisha, granting her the access to the HoH suite as well.); Reggie; Taras	By spinning the power wheel, Tim have earned the "Swap Nominee" power. After nomination, Tim could save one nominee and replace them with a save housemate.	Tim saved Johnson, cancelling 3 nomination votes against him, and replace his spot with Brenton.

=== Voting history ===
Colour key
Elected as Head of House
Selected by Head of House to gain access to the Suite
Eligible to become Head of House
Not in the House at the time when the Head of House was decided
Was not eligible to become Head of House

	Week 2	Week 3	Week 4	Week 5	Week 6	Week 7	Week 8
Method:	Pre-selected	House Vote					Consensus
Reggie	No Voting	Dave	Jules	Estelle	Johnson	Taras	Tim
Johnson	No Voting	Aleisha	Brenton	Jaycee	Reggie	Jaycee	Ineligible
Taras	No Voting	Aleisha	Brenton	Jaycee	Johnson	Jaycee	Tim
Brenton	Not in House		Ineligible	Estelle	Johnson	Jaycee	Ineligible
Aleisha	No Voting	Dave	Brenton	Jaycee	Johnson	Jaycee	Tim
Tim	No Voting	Dave	Jules	Estelle	Johnson	Jaycee	Tim
Estelle	No Voting	Dave	Jules	Jaycee	Reggie	Reggie	Ineligible
Gabbie	No Voting	Aleisha	Jules	Estelle	Reggie	Reggie	Ineligible
Jaycee	No Voting	Aleisha	Brenton	Estelle	Johnson	Reggie	Ineligible
Drew	No Voting	Aleisha	No Voting	Jaycee	Johnson	Jaycee	Evicted
Tully	No Voting	Dave	Jules	Estelle	Reggie	Reggie	Evicted
Jules	Not in House		Ineligible	Estelle	Reggie	Evicted	
Dave	No Voting	Aleisha	Jules	Estelle	Reggie	Evicted	
Sam	No Voting	Reggie	Brenton	Jaycee	Evicted		
Lulu	No Voting	Aleisha	Jules	Evicted			
Trevor	No Voting	Dave	Jules	Evicted			
Joel	No Voting	Aleisha	Evicted				
Lara	No Voting	Evicted					
Layla	No Voting	Evicted					
Mel	Evicted						
Josh	Evicted						
Notes		none	(Note: Since Jules already receiving the majority of the votes (8 Votes), Drew did not cast a vote by default.)	none			
Head of House	Tully; Pre-selected	Aleisha; 8 of 15 votes to elect	Jules; 8 of 13 votes to elect	Estelle; 8 of 14 votes to elect	Johnson; 7 of 13 votes to elect	Jaycee; 6 of 11 votes to elect	Tim; Unlucky 4's choice to elect
Suite Access	Drew; Tim	Gabbie; Lulu	Dave; Estelle; Tully	Brenton; Johnson	Jaycee; Reggie	none	Aleisha; Reggie; Taras

== Housemates ==
Twenty-one Housemates competed in the series. The first five new housemates and the eight returning housemates were announced on 7 April 2022, with the remaining 6 of the initial cast being revealed ahead of the launch. The identities of the intruders, were revealed on 26 May, ahead of their entrance on Episode 11.

Name	Age on entry	Hometown	Big Brother history		Season 14 results		
Name	Age on entry	Hometown	Season	Status	Day entered	Day exited	Result
Regina "Reggie" Sorensen	48	Cambridge, Tasmania	Big Brother 3	Winner	1	62	Winner
Johnson Ashak	25	Maroubra, New South Wales	—N/a		1	62	Runner-up
Taras Hrubyj-Piper	34	Bondi Beach, New South Wales	—N/a		1	62	Runner-up
Brenton Parkes	26	Sydney, New South Wales	—N/a		24	62	Evicted
Aleisha Campbell	24	Sydney, New South Wales	—N/a		1	61	Evicted
Timothy "Tim" Dormer	37	Sydney, New South Wales	Big Brother 10	Winner	1	59	Evicted
Timothy "Tim" Dormer	37	Sydney, New South Wales	Big Brother Canada 4	Evicted	1	59	Evicted
Estelle Landy	33	Morwell, Victoria	Big Brother 9	Evicted	1	57	Evicted
Gabrielle "Gabbie" Keevill	22	Central Coast, New South Wales	—N/a		1	53	Evicted
Jaycee Edwards	23	Perth, Western Australia	—N/a		1	50	Evicted
Anthony Drew	33	Victoria	Big Brother 10	Evicted	3	48	Evicted
Tully Smyth	34	Melbourne, Victoria	Big Brother 10	Evicted	10	45	Evicted
Jules Rangiheuea	28	Sydney, New South Wales	—N/a		24	43	Evicted
David "Dave" Graham	42	New South Wales	Big Brother 6	Evicted	1	39	Evicted
Samantha "Sam" Manovski	31	Perigian Beach, Queensland	—N/a		1	32	Evicted
Luciana "Lulu" Oliveira	39	Brisbane, Queensland (originally from Brazil)	—N/a		1	30	Evicted
Trevor Butler	48	Broken Hill, New South Wales	Big Brother 4	Winner	3	25	Evicted
Joel Notley	27	Newcastle, New South Wales	—N/a		1	18	Evicted
Lara Phillips	52	Bateau Bay, New South Wales	—N/a		1	16	Evicted
Layla Subritzky	34	Brisbane, Queensland	Big Brother 9	Runner-up	3	11	Evicted
Melanie "Mel" Todd	41	Melbourne, Victoria	—N/a		1	9	Evicted
Joshua "Josh" Goudswaard	32	Byron Bay, New South Wales	—N/a		1	4	Evicted

=== Future appearances ===
In 2025, Reggie Sorensen was the joint runner-up in the eleventh season of I'm a Celebrity...Get Me Out of Here!

In 2026, Johnson Ashak competed on Australian Survivor: Redemption.

Also in 2026, Tully Smyth would go on to compete in season 3 of The Traitors Australia.

== Episodes ==
No. overall	No. in season	Title	Day(s)	Original release date	Australian viewers
Week 1 – Launch Week
1586	1	Episode 1	Day 1–2	9 May 2022	487,000
1587	2	Episode 2	Day 2–4	10 May 2022	394,000
1588	3	Episode 3	Day 5–6	11 May 2022	379,000
1589	4	Episode 4	Day 8–9	12 May 2022	358,000
Week 2 – Battle Week
1590	5	Episode 5	Day 10–11	16 May 2022	373,000
1591	6	Episode 6	Day 12–13	17 May 2022	379,000
1592	7	Episode 7	Day 14–16	18 May 2022	359,000
Week 3 – Party Week
1593	8	Episode 8	Day 17–18	23 May 2022	343,000
1594	9	Episode 9	Day 18–21	24 May 2022	327,000
1595	10	Episode 10	Day 22–23	25 May 2022	349,000
Week 4
1596	11	Episode 11	Day 24–26	30 May 2022	294,000
1597	12	Episode 12	Day 27–28	31 May 2022	306,000
1598	13	Episode 13	Day 29–30	1 June 2022	323,000
Week 5
1599	14	Episode 14	Day 31–32	6 June 2022	378,000
1600	15	Episode 15	Day 32–33, 35	7 June 2022	369,000
1601	16	Episode 16	Day 36–37	8 June 2022	255,000
Week 6 – Temptation Week
1602	17	Episode 17	Day 37–39	13 June 2022	363,000
1603	18	Episode 18	Day 41	14 June 2022	356,000
1604	19	Episode 19	Day 42–43	15 June 2022	337,000
Week 7
1605	20	Episode 20	Day 44–45	20 June 2022	361,000
1606	21	Episode 21	Day 45–47	21 June 2022	313,000
1607	22	Episode 22	Day 48	22 June 2022	319,000
Week 8 – High Stakes Week
1608	23	Episode 23	Day 48–50	27 June 2022	304,000
1609	24	Episode 24	Day 51	28 June 2022	328,000
1610	25	Episode 25	Day 52–53	29 June 2022	320,000
Week 9
1611	26	Episode 26	Day 56	4 July 2022	348,000
1612	27	Episode 27	Day 56–57	5 July 2022	322,000
1613	28	Episode 28	Day 58–59	6 July 2022	341,000
Week 10 – Finale Week
1614	29	Episode 29	Day 59–61	10 July 2022	278,000
1615	30	Episode 30	Day 61–62	11 July 2022	329,000
1616	31	Episode 31 – Finale	TBA	12 July 2022	363,000

== Voting history ==
Key
This housemate was nominated for eviction.
This housemate was the nominating Housemate on this round.
This housemate was immune from this round of eviction due to a twist.
This housemate won the challenge and is immune for this round of eviction.
This housemate was not in the Main House and did not participate in this round of eviction.
This housemate was originally nominated but won the second chance challenge and was thus saved from eviction.
This housemate was elected Head of House and was given immunity for the week.

	Week 1				Week 2			Week 3			Week 4			Week 5				Week 6			Week 7			Week 8			Week 9					Week 10				
Episode	1	2	3	4	5	6	7	8	9	10	11	12	13	14	15	16		17	18	19	20	21	22	23	24	25	26		27		28	29		30	Finale	
Head of House	(none)				Tully			Aleisha			Jules			Estelle				Johnson			Jaycee			Tim			(none)									
Challenge Winner(s)	Joel	Joel	Lara	Layla	Red Team	Joel; Tully	Jaycee	Estelle	Taras	Johnson	Dave	Gabbie; Jules	Dave	Jules	Brenton; Taras	(none)	Jaycee	Brenton	Jaycee; Taras	Estelle	Taras	Gabbie; Tim	Brenton	Gabbie; Tim	Aleisha; Taras	Estelle	Taras		(none)	Taras	Taras	Taras	Taras	Taras	(none)	
Against House Vote	Aleisha; Lulu; Mel	Estelle; Josh; Sam	All Unimmune Housemates	Drew; Mel	Dave; Johnson; Layla	All Unimmune Housemates	Lara; Lulu	Jaycee; Joel; Johnson	All Unimmune Housemates	Estelle; Sam	Aleisha; Gabbie; Trevor	All Unimmune Housemates	Lulu; Sam	Aleisha; Drew; Sam	All Unimmune Housemates	Aleisha; Drew; Gabbie; Jaycee	Aleisha; Gabbie	Dave; Estelle; Reggie	All Unimmune Housemates	Drew; Jules	Drew; Johnson; Tully	All Unimmune Housemates	Drew; Taras	Aleisha; Jaycee; Johnson	All Unimmune Housemates	Brenton; Gabbie	Estelle; Reggie; Tim		All Housemates	Estelle; Reggie	Brenton; Johnson; Tim	All Unimmune Housemates	Aleisha; **Johnson**	All Unimmune Housemates	(none)	
Vote to:	Evict		Nominate	Evict		Nominate	Evict		Nominate	Evict		Nominate	Evict		Nominate	Evict			Nominate	Evict		Nominate	Evict		Nominate	Evict			Nominate	Evict		Nominate	Evict		Win	
Reggie	Main Frame	Sam	Layla	Mel	Johnson	Lara	Lara	Joel	Sam	Sam	Aleisha	Sam	Sam	Sam	Gabbie	Aleisha	Aleisha	Estelle	Jules	Not eligible	Drew	Johnson	Taras	Jaycee	Gabbie	Gabbie	Tim	Nominated	Secret; Arcade	Nominated	Johnson	Not eligible	Aleisha	Nominated	**Winner** (Finale)	
Johnson	No voting	Josh	Mel	Drew	Layla	Gabbie	Lulu	Joel	Estelle	Estelle	Trevor	Estelle	Lulu	Sam	~~Tully~~	Drew	Gabbie	Dave	Estelle	Not eligible	Tully	Estelle	Drew	Jaycee	Estelle	Gabbie	Estelle	Reggie	Taras	Estelle	Tim	Not eligible	Nominated	Nominated	**Runner-up** (Finale)	
Taras	No voting	Josh	Drew	Drew	Layla	~~Trevor~~	Lulu	Jaycee	Sam	Sam	Trevor	Lulu	Lulu	Drew	Drew	Drew	Gabbie	Estelle	Estelle	Not eligible	Nominating Housemate	Drew	Nominated	Jaycee	~~Johnson~~	Gabbie	Nominating; Housemate		Taras	Estelle	Nominating; Housemate	**Johnson**	Johnson	**Brenton**	**Runner-up** (Finale)	
Brenton	Not in House										Trevor	Dave	Lulu	Drew	~~Tully~~	Drew	Gabbie	Nominating Housemate	Waiting; Room	Jules	Tully	Drew	Drew	Jaycee	Gabbie	Nominated	Estelle	Tim	Taras	Estelle	Tim	Not eligible	Aleisha	Nominated	Evicted (Day 62)	
Aleisha	No voting	Sam	Layla	Drew	Layla	Estelle	Lulu	Jaycee	Dave ^{×2} Estelle	Estelle	Trevor	Estelle	Lulu	Sam	~~Tully~~	Drew	Nominated	Dave	Drew	Not eligible	Tully	Brenton	Drew	Jaycee	~~Johnson~~	Brenton	Estelle	Reggie	Taras	Estelle	Tim	Not eligible	Nominated	Evicted (Day 61)		
Tim	Main Frame	Sam	Joel	Mel	Dave	Lulu	Lara	Jaycee	Sam	Sam	Trevor	Dave	Sam	Sam	Jaycee	Aleisha	Gabbie	Dave	Waiting; Room	Jules	Tully	Taras; **Brenton**/**Taras**	Taras	Nominating Housemate	Estelle; **Brenton**	Brenton	Estelle	Nominated	Taras	Estelle	Johnson	Evicted (Day 59)				
Estelle	Main; Frame	Sam	Mel	Mel	Johnson	Lulu	Lara	Nominating; Housemate	Johnson	Nominated	Aleisha	Johnson	Sam	Drew	Drew; **Aleisha**	Drew	Aleisha; **Aleisha**	Dave	Drew	Not eligible	Johnson	Johnson	Taras	Johnson	~~Johnson~~	Gabbie	Tim	Secret; Arcade		Nominated	Evicted (Day 57)					
Gabbie	No voting	Sam	Mel	Mel	Layla	Lara	Lara	Jaycee	Jaycee	Sam	Trevor	Dave	Sam	Sam	Jaycee	Jaycee	Nominated	Dave	Jules	Not eligible	Johnson	Brenton; **Brenton**/**Taras**	Taras	Nominating Housemate	Brenton	Nominated	Evicted (Day 53)									
Jaycee	No voting	Josh	Drew	Drew	Layla	Lulu	Lulu	Joel	Estelle	Estelle	Trevor	Dave	Lulu	Drew	Drew	Drew	Gabbie	Dave	Drew	Not eligible	Tully	Drew	Drew; **Drew**	Johnson	Evicted (Day 50)											
Drew	Not in House	In Sewer	Lulu	Nominated	Johnson	Jaycee	Lara	Joel	Johnson	Estelle	Trevor	Lulu	Lulu	Aleisha	Jaycee	Jaycee	Main; Frame	Dave	Estelle	Nominated	Tully	Taras	Nominated	Evicted (Day 48)												
Tully	Not in House				Johnson	Jaycee	Lara	Joel	Johnson	Sam	Aleisha	Dave	Lulu	Sam	Johnson	Drew	Aleisha	Dave	Jules	Not eligible	Johnson	Evicted (Day 45)														
Jules	Not in House										Aleisha	Johnson	Sam	Nominating; Housemate	Gabbie	Drew	Aleisha	Reggie	Drew	Nominated	Evicted (Day 43)															
Dave	Main Frame	Sam	Layla	Drew	Johnson	Jaycee	Lulu	Joel	Johnson	Sam	Nominating Housemate	Sam	Sam	Drew	Gabbie	Drew	Aleisha	Estelle	Evicted (Day 39)																	
Sam	No voting	Estelle	Layla	Mel	Layla	Lara	Lara	Joel	Jaycee	Nominated	Trevor	Lulu	Nominated	Aleisha	Evicted (Day 32)																					
Lulu	No voting	Josh	Joel	Mel	Layla	Lara	Nominated	Joel	Sam	Sam	Aleisha	Sam	Nominated	Evicted (Day 30)																						
Trevor	Not in House	In Sewer	Joel	Mel	Johnson	Jaycee	Lara	Joel	Johnson	Sam	Gabbie	Evicted (Day 25)																								
Joel	Nominating; Housemate	**Josh**	Drew	Drew	Layla	~~Trevor~~	Lulu	Jaycee	Evicted (Day 18)																											
Lara	No voting	Josh	Drew; **Mel**	Drew	Layla	Gabbie	Nominated	Evicted (Day 16)																												
Layla	Not in House	In Sewer	Sam	Mel	Dave	Evicted (Day 11)																														
Mel	No voting	Josh	Layla	Nominated	Evicted (Day 9)																															
Josh	No voting	Estelle	Evicted (Day 4)																																	
Notes	(Note: On Night 1, Dave, Estelle, Reggie and Tim secretly entered the Main Frame. At the first Eviction Ceremony, the Main Frame was revealed, and the Main Frame was given the option to cancel the eviction. The Main Frame cancelled the eviction, and the Main Frame Housemates entered the house.)	(Note: On Night 2, Trevor, Drew and Layla entered the sewer. They entered the House on Day 5.) (Note: As the vote was tied, a tie-break vote was cast (indicated in Bold))		none	(Note: On Night 11, Big Brother introduced the Head of House title, with Tully entering the game as the first HoH.) (Note: This was a Team Nomination Challenge. The Winning Team collectively held the power to nominate. All housemates voted in the Eviction.)	(Note: As HoH, Tully could award immunity to a Housemate. This immunity was used after the Nomination Vote was held but before the results were revealed. Tully saved Trevor, cancelling two votes against him.) (Note: This was a Pairs Challenge. The winning pair would both earn immunity for the round.)	none		(Note: As HoH, Aleisha was given 3 Nomination Votes to cast.)	(Note: This was a fake eviction. After being voted off, Sam found a party envelope at the door. Sam's eviction was cancelled upon opening the envelope, and she remained in the house.)	none	(Note: As Reggie was not medically cleared to compete in this Immunity Challenge, Big Brother gave her immunity from House Nominations.)	none		(Note: Big Brother informed the Housemates that four nominees would be nominated during this House Nominations.) (Note: As HoH, Estelle could choose to save one of the nominated housemates from eviction and replace them with another housemate of her choice. She saved Tully, cancelling three votes against her, and named Aleisha as the replacement nominee.)	(Note: After failing a Panic Room task, Big Brother held an Instant Eviction. With the House voting in a face-to-face vote to evict one of the four nominees. Drew was voted out and was secretly sent to the Mainframe. Aleisha also entered the Mainframe after being voted out following the Second Chance Challenge and Eviction Ceremony.)		none	(Note: As HoH, Johnson sent Brenton & Tim to the Waiting Room, where they waited for 48 hours. The pair did not participate in House Nominations and were safe from the vote. After 48 hours, they were given a choice – go to the Eviction Room and continue the Eviction vote as normal or head straight to the Diary Room where they would have the joint power to evict either nominee. They chose to go to the Diary Room and evicted Jules.)		none			(Note: This was a Pairs Challenge. The winning pair had to agree on nominations.)	(Note: As HoH, Tim could choose to save one of the nominees and replace them with another housemate of his choice. He saved Johnson, cancelling three votes against him, and named Brenton as the replacement nominee.)	none	(Note: This eviction is a double fake eviction. After the first fake eviction of Estelle, another fake eviction vote immediately took place, sending Reggie to the Secret Arcade as well.)		(Note: After Estelle and Reggie are revealed to be in the Arcade, the remaining housemates have to nominate a housemate among themselves to join Estelle and Reggie as the next Nominees. Taras was nominated.)	none		(Note: Two Nomination Challenges took place, with the winner of each challenge being able to nominate one housemate for eviction. Additionally, the first nominee was prohibited from playing in the second challenge. Taras won the first challenge and nominated Johnson for eviction.)		(Note: The winner of the Final Challenge won a place in the Final 3 and the sole vote at the Final Eviction. The other housemates were nominated for the Final Eviction.)	(Note: For the finale, Australia voted for the winner of the fourteenth season and the $250,000 grand prize.)	
Source	none				none				none			none			none				none			none			none				none			none			none	
Vote Outcome	Eviction cancelled by Main Frame	**Josh**; 7 of 15 votes to evict	**Layla**; 5 nominations	**Mel**; 8 of 15 votes to evict	**Layla**; 9 of 17 votes to evict	**Jaycee**; 4 nominations	**Lara**; 8 of 14 votes to evict	**Joel**; 9 of 14 votes to evict	**Johnson**; 5 nominations	**Sam**; 8 of 12 votes to fake evict	**Trevor**; 9 of 15 votes to evict	**Dave**; 5 nominations	**Lulu**; 7 of 13 votes to evict	**Sam**; 6 of 13 votes to evict	**Drew**; 3 nominations	**Drew**; 9 of 13 votes to fake evict	**Aleisha**; 6 of 11 votes to fake evict	**Dave**; 8 of 12 votes to evict	**Drew**; 4 nominations	**Jules**; Tim & Brenton's choice to evict	**Tully**; 6 of 10 votes to evict	**Drew**; 3 nominations	**Drew**; 5 of 9 votes to evict	**Jaycee**; 5 of 7 votes to evict	**Estelle**; 2 nominations	**Gabbie**; 4 of 6 votes to evict	**Estelle**; 4 of 6 votes to fake evict	**Reggie**; 2 of 3 votes to fake evict	**Taras**; House's choice to nominate	**Estelle**; 5 of 5 votes to evict	**Tim**; 3 of 5 votes to evict	**Johnson**; Taras's choice to nominate	**Aleisha**; 2 of 3 votes to evict	**Brenton**; Taras's choice to evict	**Johnson**; Fewest votes to win	**Taras**; Fewest votes to win
Vote Outcome	Eviction cancelled by Main Frame	**Josh**; 7 of 15 votes to evict	**Layla**; 5 nominations	**Mel**; 8 of 15 votes to evict	**Layla**; 9 of 17 votes to evict	**Jaycee**; 4 nominations	**Lara**; 8 of 14 votes to evict	**Joel**; 9 of 14 votes to evict	**Johnson**; 5 nominations	**Sam**; 8 of 12 votes to fake evict	**Trevor**; 9 of 15 votes to evict	**Dave**; 5 nominations	**Lulu**; 7 of 13 votes to evict	**Sam**; 6 of 13 votes to evict	**Gabbie**; 3 nominations	**Drew**; 9 of 13 votes to fake evict	**Aleisha**; 6 of 11 votes to fake evict	**Dave**; 8 of 12 votes to evict	**Drew**; 4 nominations	**Jules**; Tim & Brenton's choice to evict	**Tully**; 6 of 10 votes to evict	**Drew**; 3 nominations	**Drew**; 5 of 9 votes to evict	**Jaycee**; 5 of 7 votes to evict	**Estelle**; 2 nominations	**Gabbie**; 4 of 6 votes to evict	**Estelle**; 4 of 6 votes to fake evict	**Reggie**; 2 of 3 votes to fake evict	**Taras**; House's choice to nominate	**Estelle**; 5 of 5 votes to evict	**Tim**; 3 of 5 votes to evict	**Johnson**; Taras's choice to nominate	**Aleisha**; 2 of 3 votes to evict	**Brenton**; Taras's choice to evict	**Johnson**; Fewest votes to win	**Taras**; Fewest votes to win
Vote Outcome	Eviction cancelled by Main Frame	**Josh**; 7 of 15 votes to evict	**Drew**; 4 nominations	**Mel**; 8 of 15 votes to evict	**Layla**; 9 of 17 votes to evict	**Lara**; 4 nominations	**Lara**; 8 of 14 votes to evict	**Joel**; 9 of 14 votes to evict	**Sam**; 4 nominations	**Sam**; 8 of 12 votes to fake evict	**Trevor**; 9 of 15 votes to evict	**Lulu**; 3 nominations	**Lulu**; 7 of 13 votes to evict	**Sam**; 6 of 13 votes to evict	**Jaycee**; 3 nominations	**Drew**; 9 of 13 votes to fake evict	**Aleisha**; 6 of 11 votes to fake evict	**Dave**; 8 of 12 votes to evict	**Estelle**; 3 nominations	**Jules**; Tim & Brenton's choice to evict	**Tully**; 6 of 10 votes to evict	**Brenton**; 3 nominations	**Drew**; 5 of 9 votes to evict	**Jaycee**; 5 of 7 votes to evict	**Gabbie**; 2 nominations	**Gabbie**; 4 of 6 votes to evict	**Estelle**; 4 of 6 votes to fake evict	**Reggie**; 2 of 3 votes to fake evict	**Taras**; House's choice to nominate	**Estelle**; 5 of 5 votes to evict	**Tim**; 3 of 5 votes to evict	**Johnson**; Taras's choice to nominate	**Aleisha**; 2 of 3 votes to evict	**Brenton**; Taras's choice to evict	**Johnson**; Fewest votes to win	**Taras**; Fewest votes to win
Vote Outcome	Eviction cancelled by Main Frame	**Josh**; 7 of 15 votes to evict	**Mel**; 4 nominations	**Mel**; 8 of 15 votes to evict	**Layla**; 9 of 17 votes to evict	**Lulu**; 3 nominations	**Lara**; 8 of 14 votes to evict	**Joel**; 9 of 14 votes to evict	**Estelle**; 3 nominations	**Sam**; 8 of 12 votes to fake evict	**Trevor**; 9 of 15 votes to evict	**Sam**; 3 nominations	**Lulu**; 7 of 13 votes to evict	**Sam**; 6 of 13 votes to evict	**Aleisha**; Nominated by Estelle	**Drew**; 9 of 13 votes to fake evict	**Aleisha**; 6 of 11 votes to fake evict	**Dave**; 8 of 12 votes to evict	**Jules**; 3 nominations	**Jules**; Tim & Brenton's choice to evict	**Tully**; 6 of 10 votes to evict	**Taras**; 3 nominations	**Drew**; 5 of 9 votes to evict	**Jaycee**; 5 of 7 votes to evict	**Brenton**; Nominated by Tim	**Gabbie**; 4 of 6 votes to evict	**Estelle**; 4 of 6 votes to fake evict	**Reggie**; 2 of 3 votes to fake evict	**Taras**; House's choice to nominate	**Estelle**; 5 of 5 votes to evict	**Tim**; 3 of 5 votes to evict	**Johnson**; Taras's choice to nominate	**Aleisha**; 2 of 3 votes to evict	**Brenton**; Taras's choice to evict	**Johnson**; Fewest votes to win	**Taras**; Fewest votes to win
Vote Outcome	Eviction cancelled by Main Frame	**Sam**; 6 of 15 votes to evict	**Joel**; 3 nominations	**Drew**; 7 of 15 votes to evict	**Johnson**; 6 of 17 votes to evict	**Gabbie**; **~~Trevor~~**; 2 nominations	**Lulu**; 6 of 14 votes to evict	**Jaycee**; 5 of 14 votes to evict	**Dave**; **Jaycee**; 2 nominations	**Estelle**; 4 of 12 votes to fake evict	**Aleisha**; 5 of 15 votes to evict	**Estelle**; **Johnson**; 2 nominations	**Sam**; 6 of 13 votes to evict	**Drew**; 5 of 13 votes to evict	**~~Tully~~**; 3 nominations	**Aleisha**; **Jaycee**; 2 of 13 votes to fake evict	**Gabbie**; 5 of 11 votes to fake evict	**Estelle**; 3 of 12 votes to evict	**Aleisha**; **Gabbie**; **Reggie**; **Tully**; 0 nominations	**Drew**; Tim & Brenton's choice to save	**Johnson**; 3 of 10 votes to evict	**Johnson**; 2 nominations	**Taras**; 4 of 9 votes to evict	**Johnson**; 2 of 7 votes to evict	**~~Johnson~~**; 3 nominations	**Brenton**; 2 of 6 votes to evict	**Tim**; 2 of 6 votes to evict	**Tim**; 1 of 3 votes to evict	**Aleisha**; **Brenton**; **Johnson**; **Tim**; Safe from House nominations	**Reggie**; 0 of 5 votes to evict	**Johnson**; 2 of 5 votes to evict	**Aleisha**; **Brenton**; **Reggie**; Taras's choice to save	**Johnson**; 1 of 3 votes to evict	**Johnson**; Taras's choice to save	**Reggie**; Most votes to win	
Vote Outcome	Eviction cancelled by Main Frame	**Estelle**; 2 of 15 votes to evict	**Lulu**; **Sam**; 1 nomination each	**Drew**; 7 of 15 votes to evict	**Dave**; 2 of 17 votes to evict	**Estelle**; 1 nomination	**Lulu**; 6 of 14 votes to evict	**Johnson**; 0 of 14 votes to evict	**Dave**; **Jaycee**; 2 nominations	**Estelle**; 4 of 12 votes to fake evict	**Gabbie**; 1 of 15 votes to evict	**Estelle**; **Johnson**; 2 nominations	**Sam**; 6 of 13 votes to evict	**Aleisha**; 2 of 13 votes to evict	**Johnson**; 1 nomination	**Gabbie**; 0 of 13 votes to fake evict	**Gabbie**; 5 of 11 votes to fake evict	**Reggie**; 1 of 12 votes to evict	**Aleisha**; **Gabbie**; **Reggie**; **Tully**; 0 nominations	**Drew**; Tim & Brenton's choice to save	**Drew**; 1 of 10 votes to evict	**Estelle**; 1 nomination	**Taras**; 4 of 9 votes to evict	**Aleisha**; 0 of 7 votes to evict	**~~Brenton~~**; 1 nomination	**Brenton**; 2 of 6 votes to evict	**Reggie**; 0 of 6 votes to evict	**Tim**; 1 of 3 votes to evict	**Aleisha**; **Brenton**; **Johnson**; **Tim**; Safe from House nominations	**Reggie**; 0 of 5 votes to evict	**Brenton**; 0 of 5 votes to evict	**Aleisha**; **Brenton**; **Reggie**; Taras's choice to save	**Johnson**; 1 of 3 votes to evict	**Reggie**; Taras's choice to save	**Reggie**; Most votes to win	

== Ratings ==
Ratings data is from OzTAM and represents the viewership from the 5 largest Australian metropolitan centres (Sydney, Melbourne, Brisbane, Perth and Adelaide). Total audience based on Metro and Regional ratings, 7-day time shifts and BVOD ratings.

Wk	Ep	Air date	Timeslot	Overnight ratings		Total ratings		Ref(s)
Wk	Ep	Air date	Timeslot	Viewers	Rank	Viewers	Rank	Ref(s)
1	1	9 May 2022	Monday 7:30 pm	487,000	14	976,000	10	
1	2	10 May 2022	Tuesday 7:30 pm	394,000	13	902,000	10	
1	3	11 May 2022	Wednesday 7:30 pm	379,000	18	857,000	12	
1	4	12 May 2022	Thursday 7:30 pm	358,000	14	797,000	10	
2	5	16 May 2022	Monday 7:30 pm	373,000	18	849,000	14	
2	6	17 May 2022	Tuesday 7:30 pm	379,000	14	857,000	10	
2	7	18 May 2022	Wednesday 7:30 pm	359,000	17	802,000	14	
3	8	23 May 2022	Monday 7:30 pm	343,000	19	778,000	14	
3	9	24 May 2022	Tuesday 7:30 pm	327,000	16	773,000	10	
3	10	25 May 2022	Wednesday 7:30 pm	349,000	17	795,000	12	
4	11	30 May 2022	Monday 7:30 pm	294,000	—N/a	723,000	14	
4	12	31 May 2022	Tuesday 7:30 pm	306,000	18	760,000	11	
4	13	1 June 2022	Wednesday 7:30 pm	323,000	19	729,000	13	
5	14	6 June 2022	Monday 7:30 pm	378,000	16	846,000	13	
5	15	7 June 2022	Tuesday 7:30 pm	369,000	16	793,000	11	
5	16	8 June 2022	Wednesday 7:30 pm	255,000	—N/a	686,000	15	
6	17	13 June 2022	Monday 7:30 pm	363,000	20	773,000	12	
6	18	14 June 2022	Tuesday 7:30 pm	356,000	16	774,000	11	
6	19	15 June 2022	Wednesday 7:30 pm	337,000	19	761,000	13	
7	20	20 June 2022	Monday 7:30 pm	361,000	17	774,000	13	
7	21	21 June 2022	Tuesday 7:30 pm	313,000	20	740,000	13	
7	22	22 June 2022	Wednesday 7:30 pm	319,000	17	724,000	13	
8	23	27 June 2022	Monday 7:30 pm	304,000	20	699,000	14	
8	24	28 June 2022	Tuesday 7:30 pm	328,000	17	736,000	13	
8	25	29 June 2022	Wednesday 7:30 pm	320,000	16	710,000	14	
9	26	4 July 2022	Monday 7:30 pm	348,000	—N/a	733,000	14	
9	27	5 July 2022	Tuesday 7:30 pm	322,000	16	713,000	12	
9	28	6 July 2022	Wednesday 7:30 pm	341,000	18	711,000	14	
10	29	10 July 2022	Sunday 8 pm	278,000	16	607,000	12	
10	30	11 July 2022	Monday 7:30 pm	329,000	—N/a	693,000	18	
10	31	12 July 2022	Tuesday 7:30 pm	363,000	16	750,000	11	
