= BMG Music Australia =

Australian record label

BMG Australia is the Australian office of the international music company BMG Rights Management.

The Australian office opened in March 2016, with music executive Heath Johns heading the company as managing director. Johns previously worked at Universal Music Publishing Group where he signed and developed Australian talent such as Wolfmother, Jet, The Veronicas, M-Phazes, Guy Sebastian and Peking Duk.

In July 2016, the iconic Australian independent music company Albert Music was acquired by BMG, diverting much of Alberts' contemporary and catalogue writers to BMG Australia's growing local roster.

== BMG Australia Roster ==
- The Cat Empire
- The Delta Riggs
- Drapht
- Emmi (Australian singer)
- Felix Riebl
- Harry James Angus
- Jean-Paul Fung
- Josh Pyke
- L D R U
- The Living End
- Megan Washington
- Montaigne (musician)
- Nicole Millar
- Old Man River (musician)
- Ollie McGill
- Peking Duk
- Roscoe James Irwin
- Russell Morris
- SAFIA
- San Cisco
- Urthboy
- Wave Racer
- Wolfmother
- Lists of record labels
