= Big Brother (Australian TV series) season 9 =

Big Brother
- Season 9
- Presented by: Sonia Kruger
- No. of days: 87
- No. of housemates: 16
- Winner: Benjamin Norris
- Runners-up: Layla Subritzky; Estelle Landy
- Companion shows: Big Brother Confidential
- No. of episodes: 89

Release
- Original network: Nine Network
- Original release: 13 August – 7 November 2012

Season chronology
- ← Previous; Season 8 Next → Season 10

The ninth season of the Australian reality television series Big Brother, also known as Big Brother 2012, was the first to air on the Nine Network who signed a deal with Southern Star Group in September 2011 to broadcast the show. The season began with a pre-recorded launch show on 13 August 2012. Benjamin Norris was announced the winner of the ninth season on 7 November 2012, making him the first openly gay person to win the Australian version of Big Brother. Benjamin proposed to his boyfriend, also named Ben, during the show's finale.

This season introduced Sonia Kruger as the new host of Big Brother. Mike Goldman continued his role of providing voice over narration for the show. The production was based at the same compound, located within the Dreamworld theme park, that had been used in all previous Australian seasons. This season also use some of the game mechanics from the Secret Story franchise. In this season, Big Brother was voiced by Leon Murray. Unlike the stricter and more authoritarian tones of previous voice actors such as Nick Colquhoun, Murray adopted a friendly and jokey style, often interacting with housemates in a more lighthearted manner. He maintained this approachable and humorous style throughout the 2013 and 2014 seasons, continuing the shift away from the more punitive tone of earlier years.

== Production ==
After four years off air, the Nine Network confirmed on 9 September 2011 that they had signed a contract with Southern Star Group to air the series in 2012; the first time a broadcaster other than Network Ten has broadcast the show in Australia. In September 2011, when the location of the Big Brother compound had not yet been officially confirmed, Queensland Premier Anna Bligh stated that she would do everything possible to see the show return to the Gold Coast. A spokesperson from Dreamworld, the original home of Big Brother, stated on 21 September 2011 that nothing was locked in but that the theme park would welcome the return of the show. In December 2011, The Daily Telegraph reported that Fox Studios Australia and Warner Bros. Movie World had also expressed interest. In an interview ahead of the season launch, Kruger suggested that Big Brother would be family friendly and air at 7.00 pm.

Several days after the news Big Brother was to return, Southern Star Group announced on their casting website that they would be accepting pre-audition applications for people who were interested in participating on the season. The official Facebook page for the show, as directed to by the Southern Star website, was opened on 15 September 2011. On 22 February 2012, it was officially announced that Big Brother would return to Dreamworld in 2012. Auditions began on 15 March, and took place in all major capital cities, as well as Gold Coast, in April and May 2012. More than twenty thousand people applied to be on the ninth season. The Official Big Brother Australia website reported that 14 housemates would be entering the house after going into lockdown on 4 August.

== Format ==
This season each of the original fourteen housemates entered with a secret. The task in the first week was for the female housemates to match up the male housemates with their secrets. The secrets were that: one has the IQ of a genius (Michael), one became scared of birds after an emu attack (Bradley), one has been fired from every job he's ever had (Benjamin), one hasn't had a girlfriend since he was 11 (Ryan), one was a juvenile offender (Ray), one has dated more than 100 women (Josh), and one is a multimillionaire (George). The following week the girl's secrets were revealed for the male members of the house to solve. The secrets were that: one had Obsessive Compulsive Disorder (Charne), one was a champion weightlifter (Angie), one is a high school dropout (Estelle), one was a nude protester (Sarah), one used to be an emo (Zoe), one was a hand model (Stacey) and that one is a member of a royal family (Layla).

== Housemates ==
On launch night, ten housemates (seven women and three men) entered the house on Day 0. The seven women first entered through a room called the parlour for a secret task, but later entered the house. Two more male housemates entered the house on Day 2, two via a live special, and two more revealed on the next day's show. After Week 5's and Week 6's nominations, a female and male intruder entered the house. Ava entered on Day 29, and Sam entered on Day 36. Unlike the original fourteen housemates, no intruders are keeping a secret in the house.

Name	Age on entry	Hometown	Secret	Day entered	Day exited	Result
Benjamin Norris	32	Victoria	"I have been fired from every job I've had"	3	87	Winner
Layla Subritzky	24	Brisbane (originally from the United Kingdom)	"I am a member of a royal family"	0	87	Runner-up
Estelle Landy	24	Morwell, Victoria	"I was a high-school drop out"	0	87	3rd place
Michael Beveridge	26	Brisbane	"I have the IQ of a genius"	0	85	Evicted
Zoe Westgarth	23	New South Wales	"I used to be an emo"	0	85	Evicted
Sam Wallace	21	Gold Coast/Tamworth, New South Wales	—N/a	36	84	Evicted
Stacey Wren	24	Sydney	"I was a hand model"	0	77	Evicted
Angela "Angie" Murray	21	Gold Coast	"I was a champion weight lifter"	0	70	Evicted
Josh Moore	28	South Australia	"I have dated over 100 women"	0	60	Walked
Bradley Darke	19	Coraki	"I have Ornithophobia as the result of an emu attack"	0	56	Evicted
Ava David	29	Victoria	—N/a	29	51	Evicted
George Baramily	25	Western Australia	"I am a multi-millionaire"	2	42	Evicted
Ray Baxter	25	Brisbane	"I was a juvenile offender"	2	35	Evicted
Sarah Wentworth-Perry	30	Wagga Wagga	"I was a nude protester"	0	28	Evicted
Ryan Buckingham	22	Victoria	"I haven't had a girlfriend since I was 11"	2	21	Evicted
Charne Louise	31	Gold Coast	"I have Obsessive Compulsive Disorder"	0	14	Evicted

== Weekly summary and highlights ==
Week 1	Entrances	On Day 1, Michael, Sarah, Angie, Zoe, Layla, Josh, Charne, Estelle, Stacey and Bradley entered the Big Brother house. The women all entered through the parlour, while the men entered through the main entrance.; On Day 2, George and Ryan entered the House. Benjamin and Ray, the final two male housemates, entered during the late hours of Day 2.
Week 1	Events	On Day 5, Bradley celebrated his 19th Birthday with Big Brother organising a surprise Superheroes party for him. Bradley was given a Batman costume with B-Rad written on it. While Big Brother distracted Bradley in the Diary Room, the other housemates got dressed up as superheroes and set up the backyard for the party.
Week 1	Tasks	A secret task was given to the female housemates before entering the house. To ensure safety for the first eviction, they must match up seven secrets to the seven male housemates, by the end of the week. The female housemates can only discuss these secrets inside the parlour. After the task announcement, all the female housemates entered the House.; On Day 3, all housemates were set their first weekly task that "kept them on their toes". Throughout the day, housemates had to dance to music being played by Big Brother. On Day 4, housemates were informed they had passed the task and given access to the gym and a generous food budget.
Week 2	Tasks	On Day 7, the female housemates failed their secret task, granting the male housemates safety from nomination for the week. The male housemates then received the same task (to guess the female housemates secrets) with the same outcome should they fail. The male housemates can only discuss these secrets inside the 'man cave'.; Housemates were also given their weekly task called the Road Trip Task. They would have to complete a 3627 kilometre trip in a motorbike and side-car (two housemates sitting in the vehicle at all times until the odometer passes 3627 km). Success will give housemates a luxury food budget.; While cleaning the fish tank, Michael is given a secret task from Surly the Fish. After successfully hugging each housemate within ten minutes without raising suspicion, Michael is granted access to the Secret Executive Bathroom, complete with bath, shower, champagne, bath soaps and dressing gowns.
Week 2	Nominations	On Day 8, Housemates nominated for the first time, dividing five nomination points between two houseguests. For failing the Week 1 task, only female housemates were eligible to be nominated. Charne received the most votes, with Estelle and Layla also nominated.
Week 2	Exits	On Day 14, Charne was the first evicted housemate. She received the lowest 'save' vote from the public (24%). Estelle received 27%, and Layla received 49%.
Week 3	Tasks	On Day 14, the male housemates also failed their task, granting the female housemates safety from nomination for the week.
Week 3	Nominations	On Day 15, only male housemates were eligible to be nominated. Ryan, Benjamin and Bradley were nominated.
Week 3	Exits	On Day 21, with 32% of the public 'save' vote, Ryan was the second housemate to be evicted from the Big Brother House. Benjamin narrowly escaped eviction with 33%, and Bradley with 35%.; Ryan was given the opportunity to gift the 'Nominations Super Power' to any current housemate. He gave the power to Estelle, giving her a mystery advantage for the next round of nominations.
Week 4	Tasks	As part of the Day 21 Eviction, an 'error' was broadcast to the house that accidentally revealed 'House 2', a second Big Brother house existing alongside them, following the same rules. The house competed in challenges 'against House 2' throughout the week. In reality, there was no House 2 and the housemates were shown fake footage with actors pretending to be another set of housemates.
Week 4	Nominations	As holder of the 'Nominations Super Power', Estelle was able to view the nominations tally as it stood before she cast her votes.; Sarah, Bradley and Ray received the most votes and were nominated.
Week 4	Exits	On Day 28, Sarah became the third housemate to be evicted. Sarah was given 18% of votes to save, Bradley was given 32% and Ray was given 50%.; Sarah gave her 'Nominations Super Power' to Benjamin.
Week 5	Entrances	On Day 29, intruder Ava entered the house.
Week 5	Tasks	Housemates acted as animals in the Big Brother wildlife documentary. Housemates must follow the instructions of a David Attenborough-esque narrator to pass the task.
Week 5	Nominations	As holder of the 'Nominations Super Power', Benjamin was given two sets of five nomination points to distribute for the week, giving him the power to distribute ten points over four housemates.; Ava was given safety from nomination for her first week in the house.
Week 5	Exits	On Day 35, Ray was evicted from the Big Brother House. He gave the 'Nominations Super Power' to George.
Week 6	Entrances	On Day 36, intruder Sam entered the house.
Week 6	Tasks	
Week 6	Nominations	As holder of the 'Nominations Super Power', George was given the right to view the nominations tally board as the housemates nominated, and saw the points distributed on the board as they changed. He was also given the right to select one housemate of his choice and erase their nominations. Unluckily, as a result George was one of the three nominees for the week.; Sam was given safety from nomination for his first week in the house.
Week 6	Exits	On Day 42, George was evicted, with 1% less 'save' votes than Bradley. He gave the 'Nominations Super Power' to Layla.
Week 7	Events	On Day 44, Delilah, the dog, enters the house as the "17th housemate".
Week 7	Tasks	This week's task was 'The Big Brother Factory'. Housemates had to 'clock in' for their shift doing menial labour with only headphones playing music to entertain them. Unbeknownst to new housemate Sam, this was a fake task at his expense. While Sam competed his shift, all other housemates were given special food and fun activities. Housemates successfully fooled Sam into thinking they were all working in the Factory and passed the task.
Week 7	Nominations	As holder of the 'Nominations Super Power', Layla was only permitted to give one nomination (for 6 points) but it could be for any reason at all.
Week 7	Exits	The Week 7 eviction was held two days late due to scheduling reasons.; On Day 51, Ava was evicted. She gave the 'Nominations Super Power' to Estelle.
Week 8	Tasks	For this week's task, housemates must accept misleading offers from Big Brother.
Week 8	Nominations	As holder of the 'Nominations Super Power', Estelle was given the opportunity to listen to two housemates' nominations, and use the information to make her subsequent nominations.
Week 8	Exits	On Day 56, Bradley is evicted. He gave the 'Nominations Super Power' to Josh.
Week 9	Events	On Day 58, Big Brother went quiet. When he returned, housemates received a warning for breaking house rules in his absence.
Week 9	Tasks	For this week's task, the house was split into two halves, Red and Blue. They would compete for rewards (such as bedroom access, pantry/staples) and prizes. Layla won a new Holden Volt, beating Benjamin and Angie on a Big Brother quiz. The task was cancelled on Day 60.; Following Josh's departure, the housemates received a new task: to act out a live sitcom, re-enacting important times from the house.
Week 9	Nominations	As holder of the 'Nominations Super Power', Josh had to guess who each housemate would nominate and for every correct guess he would receive one point. Out of a possible sixteen points, Josh correctly guessed 8 times and used these points for his nominations.
Week 9	Exits	On Day 60, Josh withdrew from the competition after receiving some tragic personal news from outside the house. As a result, the weekly task was cancelled, social media updates were paused, and the week's eviction was cancelled.
Week 10	Tasks	This week the housemates had to look after 'Big Baby', a realistic baby doll. Every time it cries, housemates have 30 seconds for two of them to comfort the baby in its nursery.
Week 10	Nominations	Due to the cancelled eviction in Week 9, the three nominees were automatically nominated in Week 10. Housemates had to nominate three more nominees to join them. As a result, Angie, Benjamin, Estelle, Layla, Sam and Zoe were all up for eviction.; As holder of the 'Nominations Super Power', Michael was given the opportunity to select someone's nominations, cancel them out and replace them with his nominations a second time.
Week 10	Exits	On Day 70, Angie is evicted. She gave Layla the 'Nominations Super Power'.
Week 11	Tasks	This week's task was to ignore "unwelcome guests", no matter who they are and what they do, who try to provoke the current housemates. Past housemates Pete Timbs (BB'01), Nathan Morris (BB'02), Regina Bird (BB'03), Trevor Butler, Ryan Fitzgerald and Paul Dyer (BB'04), and Vesna Tosevska and Tim Brunero (BB'05), all entered the house as part of this task. The housemates failed to ignore the guests successfully.
Week 11	Nominations	Housemates family members entered the house to assist with nominations. After each housemate nominated one person for 4 points, their family member nominated one person for 1 point. They were not permitted to communicate with their family member whatsoever.; As holder of the 'Nominations Super Power', Layla was the final housemate to nominate and was able to view the nominations tally before she voted. Additionally, she had full control over her points, could allocate them as she wished, and was able to talk with her father who could give Layla advice.
Week 11	Exits	On Day 77, Stacey was evicted.
Week 12	Events	On Day 78, Big Brother revealed the secrets that housemates had not yet revealed from their time in the game. Surly the Fish, the Executive Bathroom, and other secret tasks were revealed.
Week 12	Tasks	For their last weekly task, housemates made their own television shows.
Week 12	Nominations	All housemates were nominated for Week 12.
Week 12	Exits	On Day 84, Sam was evicted. Delilah also leaves the house, adopted by new family.
Week 13	Exits	On Day 85, Michael and Zoe were evicted, leaving the final three housemates: Benjamin, Estelle and Layla.; On Day 87: Estelle was evicted in third and was awarded $5,000. Layla placed second winning $10,000 (plus the Holden Volt she previously won in a task). First place went to Benjamin winning $250,000 and a brand new Holden Cruze. He also proposed to his boyfriend, also named Ben.

== Nominations Super Power ==
The Nominations Super Power is a weekly twist to nominations. It is a special secret power given to a housemate. The Nominations Super Power gives an advantage to that housemate for nominations in that given week.

	Housemate	Super Power	Used on
Week 4	Estelle	The ability to view the current nominations tally as it stood before she cast her vote.	N/A
Week 5	Benjamin	The ability to distribute ten points over four housemates	Angie, Bradley, Estelle and Ray
Week 6	George	The ability to view the nominations tally board as the housemates nominated, saw the points distributed on the board as they changed and swapped and to select one housemate of his choice and get rid of the nomination.	Benjamin
Week 7	Layla	The ability to give one nomination (for 6 points) for any reason at all.	Estelle
Week 8	Estelle	The ability to listen in on the nominations of two housemates.	Bradley and Michael
Week 9	Josh	The ability to win up to 16 nomination points to nominate as many housemates as he wished if they guessed who each housemate would nominate and for every correct guess he would receive one point.	N/A
Week 10	Michael	The ability to select someone's nominations, cancel them out and replace them with exactly the same as his.	Estelle
Week 11	Layla	The ability to view the nominations tally before she voted and had full control over her points (whether to nominate regularly in a 3/2 or 4/1 vote allocation, or just one person with all 5 points). Additionally, she was able to talk with her father (as the "Open House" task did not apply to the Diary Room, where she cast her vote) who could give Layla advice about her nominations in addition to moral support.	Benjamin and Stacy

== Nominations table ==
This series, housemates were allowed to distribute five nomination points between their two nominations, with a maximum of four points to be allocated to one housemate. The three or more housemates with the most votes face the public vote to save. In addition, nominations are now held in a sound-proof chamber inside a Nominations Room, as opposed to the Diary Room.

Color key:

Winner
Runner-up
Nomination Super Power winner
Nominated
Exempt
No Nomination
Walked
Evicted

	Week 2	Week 3	Week 4	Week 5	Week 6	Week 7	Week 8	Week 9	Week 10	Week 11	Week 12	Week 13		Nomination points received
	Week 2	Week 3	Week 4	Week 5	Week 6	Week 7	Week 8	Week 9	Week 10	Week 11	Week 12	Day 85	Finale	Nomination points received
Nominations Super Power	none		Estelle	Benjamin	George	Layla	Estelle	Josh	Michael	Layla	none			Nomination points received
Benjamin	4-Layla; 1-Angie	3-Ryan; 2-Bradley	4-Bradley; 1-Estelle	4-Estelle; 1-Ray	~~4-Bradley~~; ~~1-Angie~~	1-Josh; 4-Angie	4-Sam; 1-Angie	4-Sam; 1-Angie	4-Layla; 1-Zoe	4-Sam; 1-Layla	No nominations	No nominations	Winner (Day 87)	44
Benjamin	4-Layla; 1-Angie	3-Ryan; 2-Bradley	4-Bradley; 1-Estelle	4-Bradley; 1-Angie	~~4-Bradley~~; ~~1-Angie~~	1-Josh; 4-Angie	4-Sam; 1-Angie	4-Sam; 1-Angie	4-Layla; 1-Zoe	4-Sam; 1-Layla	No nominations	No nominations	Winner (Day 87)	44
Layla	3-Estelle; 2-Charne	3-Ryan; 2-Benjamin	4-Bradley; 1-Ray	4-Estelle; 1-Bradley	4-Estelle; 1-Bradley	6-Estelle	4-Bradley; 1-Angie	3-Angie; 2-Estelle	3-Benjamin; 2-Stacey	3-Stacey; 2-Benjamin	No nominations	No nominations	Runner-up (Day 87)	37
Estelle	3-Layla; 2-Stacey	3-Benjamin; 2-Michael	4-Sarah; 1-Angie	3-Stacey; 2-Zoe	3-Angie; 2-Bradley	2-Angie; 3-Stacey	2-Michael; 3-Bradley	3-Stacey; 2-Michael	~~4-Stacey~~; ~~1-Michael~~	4-Benjamin; 1-Michael	No nominations	No nominations	Third place (Day 87)	89
Estelle	3-Layla; 2-Stacey	3-Benjamin; 2-Michael	4-Sarah; 1-Angie	3-Stacey; 2-Zoe	3-Angie; 2-Bradley	2-Angie; 3-Stacey	2-Michael; 3-Bradley	3-Stacey; 2-Michael	3-Zoe; 2-Layla	4-Benjamin; 1-Michael	No nominations	No nominations	Third place (Day 87)	89
Michael	4-Charne; 1-Estelle	3-Ray; 2-Ryan	4-Ray; 1-Bradley	3-Ray; 2-Estelle	4-George; 1-Estelle	4-Ava; 1-Estelle	2-Sam; 3-Estelle	2-Estelle; 3-Sam	3-Zoe; 2-Layla	4-Estelle; 1-Layla	No nominations	No nominations	Evicted (Day 85)	30
Zoe	4-Estelle; 1-Sarah	3-Bradley; 2-Ryan	3-Ray; 2-Estelle	3-Estelle; 2-Ray	3-Bradley; 2-Angie	2-Ava; 3-Angie	3-Michael; 2-Sam	3-Angie; 2-Sam	3-Stacey; 2-Layla	4-Stacey; 1-Sam	No nominations	No nominations	Evicted (Day 85)	20
Sam	Not In; House					Exempt	3-Benjamin; 2-Bradley	4-Josh; 1-Stacey	3-Benjamin; 2-Zoe	4-Benjamin; 1-Stacey	No nominations	Evicted (Day 84)		29
Stacey	3-Charne; 2-Estelle	3-Bradley; 2-Ray	3-Ray; 2-Bradley	3-Ray; 2-Angie	3-Bradley; 2-Estelle	3-Michael; 2-Angie	3-Bradley; 2-Josh	3-Sam; 2-Estelle	3-Layla; 2-Michael	4-Estelle; 1-Sam	Evicted (Day 77)			37
Angie	3-Estelle; 2-Charne	3-Bradley; 2-Ray	4-Ray; 1-Estelle	3-Estelle; 2-Ray	3-Estelle; 2-Bradley	3-Estelle; 2-Ava	3-Sam; 2-Bradley	3-Michael; 2-Estelle	3-Zoe; 2-Layla	Evicted (Day 70)				61
Josh	3-Charne; 2-Sarah	3-Ryan; 2-George	4-Estelle; 1-Layla	3-Ray; 2-Bradley	3-Estelle; 2-George	3-Estelle; 2-Angie	4-Angie; 1-Stacey	5-Angie; 3-Layla	Walked (Day 60)					8
Bradley	4-Charne; 1-Zoe	3-Benjamin; 2-Ryan	4-Sarah; 1-Michael	3-Benjamin; 2-Stacey	4-Estelle; 1-Stacey	3-Michael; 2-Zoe	4-Layla; 1-Michael	Evicted (Day 56)						67
Ava	Not In; House				Exempt	3-Bradley; 2-Stacey	Evicted (Day 51)							8
George	3-Angie; 2-Layla	4-Benjamin; 1-Ryan	3-Sarah; 2-Bradley	3-Angie; 2-Bradley	3-Benjamin; 2-Estelle	Evicted (Day 42)								8
Ray	4-Charne; 1-Estelle	4-Benjamin; 1-Bradley	4-Angie; 1-Sarah	4-Angie; 1-Benjamin	Evicted (Day 35)									36
Sarah	3-Angie; 2-Layla	4-Michael; 1-Josh	3-Michael; 2-Angie	Evicted (Day 28)										15
Ryan	4-Stacey; 1-Layla	4-Bradley; 1-Benjamin	Evicted (Day 21)											16
Charne	3-Zoe; 2-Stacey	Evicted (Day 14)												22
Notes	1	2	None			3, 4	None	5		6	7			
Against public vote	Charne, Estelle, Layla	Benjamin, Bradley, Ryan	Bradley, Ray, Sarah	Angie, Estelle, Ray	Bradley, Estelle, George	Angie, Ava, Estelle	Angie, Bradley, Michael, Sam	Angie, Estelle, Sam	Angie, Benjamin, Estelle, Layla, Sam, Zoe	Benjamin, Estelle, Stacey	Benjamin, Estelle, Layla, Michael, Sam, Zoe	Benjamin, Estelle, Layla, Michael, Zoe	Benjamin, Estelle, Layla	
Walked	none							Josh	none					
Evicted	Charne; 24% to save	Ryan; 32% to save	Sarah; 18% to save	Ray; 26% to save	George; 30% to save	Ava; 14% to save	Bradley; 14% to save	Eviction cancelled	Angie; 10.6% to save	Stacey; 24% to save	Sam; 7% to win	Zoe; 14% to win	Estelle; 29% to win	
Evicted	Charne; 24% to save	Ryan; 32% to save	Sarah; 18% to save	Ray; 26% to save	George; 30% to save	Ava; 14% to save	Bradley; 14% to save	Eviction cancelled	Angie; 10.6% to save	Stacey; 24% to save	Sam; 7% to win	Michael; 16% to win	Layla; 31% to win	
Saved	Estelle; 27% Layla; 49%	Benjamin; 33% Bradley; 35%	Bradley; 32% Ray; 50%	Estelle; 29% Angie; 45%	Bradley; 31% Estelle; 39%	Estelle; 38% Angie; 48%	Angie; 19% Sam; 21% Michael; 46%	Eviction cancelled	Sam; 11.4% Zoe; 15.5% Estelle; 20.1% Benjamin; 20.8% Layla; 21.6%	Benjamin; 30% Estelle; 46%	Zoe; 15% Michael; 16% Layla; 18% Benjamin; 20% Estelle; 24%	?? 23% ?? 23% ?? 24%	Benjamin; 40% to win	

=== Notes ===
- ^Note 1: The female housemates were set a secret task to potentially earn immunity for the second week. They had to match up the seven given secrets to the seven male housemates who entered the house throughout the week. If all seven secrets were correctly matched to the correct male, all the female housemates would be immune. The females failed to match up the secrets, and therefore were the only ones who could be nominated in Week 2.
- ^Note 2: Right after the reveal of the males' secrets, the male housemates were set a secret task to potentially earn immunity for the third week. They were to match up seven given secrets to the seven female housemates throughout the week. If all seven secrets were correctly matched to the correct female, all the male housemates would be immune for the second straight week. On the night of the first live eviction, the males failed the task, making the females immune for the third week in the Big Brother house.
- ^Note 3: Because of scheduling conflicts with the network's airing of the NRL Grand Final, Week 7's eviction took place on Day 51 instead of Day 49.
- ^Note 4: This week's nominations contained a compulsory strategic vote, in which one nomination from each housemate had to be for strategic reasons.
- ^Note 5: Josh left the Big Brother House on Day 60 due to a personal emergency. After his departure, voting lines were terminated – with the funds from the votes going to a charity of Josh's choice – and the eviction was cancelled. The eviction was replaced with a live special celebrating Josh's time in the House. The Housemates nominated for the cancelled eviction (Angie, Estelle and Sam) remained nominated for the next eviction, with a new round of Nomination Voting adding at least three more nominees for eviction (between Michael, Benjamin, Zoe, Stacey and Layla).
- ^Note 6: Week 11's nominations were the final nominations of the season. However, friends and family of the housemates – who entered the house as part of the "Open House" task – would perform the second nomination, nominating with one point, whereas the housemate themselves (apart from Layla, per her Nomination Super Power) had to nominate one housemate for four points. They were separated during the nominations process, with the relatives sitting in the lounge and called into the nominations room after their housemate had voted. Housemates sat in the nominations room as usual and were instructed to "ignore" their loved one for their weekly shopping task.
- ^Note 7: Following Week 11's eviction on Day 77, the public began voting for the winner. On Day 84, the lines froze for a vote reading; Sam was evicted, having garnered the fewest votes to win. Big Brother revealed the percentage of "win" votes each housemate garnered. On Day 85, the season's first and only double eviction took place; Zoe and Michael were evicted, having garnered the fewest votes to win.

== Josh's departure ==
On Day 59, Josh was called to the Captains Quarters, where he was taken out of the house to see his parents. They told him of the sudden death of his only sibling, Toby. Josh spent the night outside of the house, where he made the decision to stay with his family and not return to the house. On Day 60, housemates were informed of the situation, and said their goodbyes in the early hours of Day 60. Out of respect for Josh and his family, Big Brother turned the cameras off for these goodbyes. As a result of Josh leaving, voting lines for eviction were closed—with any votes cast prior being invalidated—and the funds donated to the Salvation Army; a choice by Josh and his family. Also, the weekly challenge was ended prematurely and live feeds from the official website were paused. The upcoming eviction was also canceled, instead replaced with Josh's return to say thank you to the public for their support which was followed by the routinely used 'highlights' show.

== Special episodes ==
A number of special episodes aired during the original run of the season. These included:

=== Live Special ===
"Live Special" was a live daily show that was broadcast on Day 2 in which the final four male housemates entered the House. Two were revealed live (George and Ryan), and two were revealed on the next day's daily show.

A second Live Special was broadcast on Day 63 to replace what was supposed to be the eighth eviction of the season, but was cancelled due to the sudden departure of housemate Josh on Day 60. Along with the regular highlights from the past few days, there was also clips reminiscing about Josh's time in the house.

=== The New Housemates ===
"The New Housemates" was a live daily show that was broadcast on Day 3

=== Secrets Revealed Live ===
"Secrets Revealed Live" was a live show that was broadcast on Day 7. The parlour twist was revealed to all the housemates, and the female housemates had to correctly match all the males' secrets without failing four times. The females failed to match the final secrets belonging to Benjamin and George, and so the females were to risk being nominated for Week 2. After the task, the male housemates were set the same task for the new week, and began to evaluate the females' secrets in the renovated parlour called the man cave.

=== Live Nominations 4 / Intruder Alert ===
The "4th Live Nominations" was the nomination and intruder special that was broadcast on Day 29.

=== Intruder Incoming ===
"Intruder Incoming" was a live daily show that was broadcast on Day 37

=== Live Josh Special ===
"Live Josh Special" was a live special where instead of an eviction that was broadcast on Day 63.

=== Little Sister Special ===
"Big Brother's Little Sister" were two special episodes broadcast on Day 65 and 79 where Big Brother's "Little Sister" asked the housemates questions sent in by the viewers.

=== Big Secrets ===
"Big Secrets" was a live daily show that was broadcast on Day 78

== Ratings ==
The launch ratings for this season were up significantly from 2008 as the opening night show reached 2.1 million viewers at its peak and averaged at 1.6 million viewers, the franchise's highest ratings since the 2003 series.

	Viewers (millions) 5-City Metro												
	Week 1	Week 2	Week 3	Week 4	Week 5	Week 6	Week 7	Week 8	Week 9	Week 10	Week 11	Week 12	Week 13
Sunday		0.23	**1.30**	**1.00**	**1.09**	**1.05**	**1.05**		**0.99**	**0.94**	**0.98**	**0.97**	**0.95**
Sunday		**1.42**	**1.30**	**1.00**	**1.09**	**1.05**	**1.05**		**0.99**	**0.94**	**0.98**	**0.97**	**0.95**
Monday	**1.71**	**1.29**	**1.16**	**1.05**	**1.02**	**1.06**	**0.97**	**0.99**	**0.90**	**0.94**	**0.94**	**1.13**	**1.06**
Monday	**1.71**	**1.26**	**1.15**	**1.06**	**1.09**	**1.02**	**1.02**	**0.99**	**1.02**	**1.02**	**1.07**	**1.13**	**1.16**
Tuesday	**1.41**	**1.10**	**1.12**	**1.02**	**1.13**	**1.07**	**1.05**	**1.06**	**0.99**	**1.00**	**0.96**	**0.94**	**1.00**
Wednesday	**1.22**	**1.09**	**1.16**	**1.09**	**1.01**	**1.04**	**1.07**	**1.03**	**0.95**	**0.96**	**0.95**	**0.85**	**1.30**
Wednesday	**1.22**	**1.09**	**1.16**	**1.09**	**1.01**	**1.04**	**1.07**	**1.15**	**0.95**	**0.96**	**0.95**	**0.85**	**1.39**
Wednesday	**1.22**	**1.09**	**1.16**	**1.09**	**1.01**	**1.04**	**1.07**	**1.15**	**0.95**	**0.96**	**0.95**	**0.85**	**1.58**
Thursday	**1.06**	**1.12**	**1.10**	**1.03**	**0.98**	**0.94**	**0.90**	**0.85**	**0.98**	**0.86**	**0.88**	**0.99**	
Friday	**0.90**	**0.97**	**0.87**	**0.82**	**0.82**	**0.86**	**0.87**	**0.86**	**0.92**	**0.76**	**0.71**	**0.76**	
Weekly average	1.26	1.18	1.12	1.01	1.02	1.00	0.99	0.99	0.96	0.93	0.93	0.94	1.21
Running average	1.26	1.22	1.19	1.14	1.12	1.11	1.08	1.07	1.06	1.05	1.04	1.03	1.04
Series average	1.04m												

Ratings are rounded to the nearest ten thousand. Shows on GO! are not included in official averages. Figures in bold include consolidated viewing figures.

== Alleged bullying ==
Estelle Landy alleged that Ben Norris engaged in bullying behaviour toward her during their time in the Big Brother house. Norris acknowledged interpersonal conflict between them but rejected the characterisation of his behaviour as bullying. Landy and Big Brother 2013 winner Tim Dormer publicly criticised Norris in the years following this season, based on their belief that he had mistreated her during filming. In response to accusations of bullying, Norris stated that his outspoken behaviour was frequently misrepresented in the televised edit and argued that his interactions with Landy were interpreted unfairly. Norris suggested that the program's portrayal framed Landy as a victim, which he believed exaggerated the extent and intent of his behaviour toward her. Norris further stated that describing his behaviour as "bullying" was inaccurate and, in his view, undermined the seriousness of genuine bullying. He maintained that his actions amounted to speaking frankly rather than engaging in harassment.

It was claimed that Landy later stated she had ceased contact with Norris due to her belief that he had bullied her, and suggested that similar allegations were also made by Landy regarding fellow housemate and runner-up Layla Subritzky. Despite these allegations, Landy and Norris maintained a close friendship following the conclusion of Big Brother 2012. It was alleged that Norris provided Landy with personal support during this period, including assistance with travel and accommodation, and remained supportive during times when she was struggling. After competing alongside Landy on Big Brother 2022, Dormer later publicly distanced himself from her, stating that he had supported her claims for many years before reconsidering his position. Dormer indicated that he had come to believe others were unfairly cast as antagonists and rejected the idea that he and Norris should be portrayed as villains in her narrative.
