= List of Big Brother (Australian TV series) shows =

During each series, specific elements of the competition have a special show dedicated to them, usually presented on a specific evening. Each weeknight and on Sunday evenings a compilation of the general events in the House for the previous day are presented. All live shows are broadcast with a 30-second delay so that images or language that cannot be broadcast due to Australia's censorship laws can be cut. These programs add up to approximately 16 hours per week. Except for during its first season, Big Brother episodes screened each day except Saturday.

== Main shows ==
=== Launch ===
Launch is the first episode of the Big Brother Australia series that introduces the new Housemates and the House for that year. Much like overseas iterations, the first episode is often pre-recorded 24-hours before it airs, except for 2003 when it was broadcast live for the first and only time. When the series aired on the 7 Network from 2020–23, the entire season was pre-recorded, including the launch night. Previously, the show was hosted by Gretel Killeen from 2001–07, Kyle Sandilands and Jackie O in 2008, Sonia Kruger from 2012-2023 and currently Mel Tracina from 2025 onwards. In different seasons it ran under various titles such as Day One, In They Go and The Secret Revealed.

=== Daily Show ===
The Daily Show aired Monday - Friday at 7:00 pm – 7:30 pm for all seasons of the series. It reported on the previous day's happenings inside the House. Mike Goldman provided voice over narration from season 1 — 11, and currently from season 16 onwards. Host Sonia Kruger narrated the show when it aired on Channel 7 from seasons 12–15, including Big Brother VIP.

Later seasons of Big Brother added a Sunday edition of the Daily Show, which covered the preceding Friday and Saturday, which screened Sundays at 6:30 pm – 7:30 pm. Occasionally, in various seasons of the series, the Daily Show episode would run to one hour, sometimes to accommodate a special event in the house.

For the 2001 through to the 2007 seasons, on screen it simply carried the title Big Brother. For the 2008 season the on-screen title was shown as Big Brother: Daily Show. During the 2008 season the Monday evening installment was extended to a one-hour duration when the housemate nominations were incorporated into the episode.

In 2012, the Daily Show aired from Tuesday - Thursday at 7:00 pm – 8:00 pm and Friday at 7:00 pm – 7:30 pm. Sunday and Monday did not include a Daily Show – instead a recap of the day was merged into the Sunday and Monday live shows.

From 2020-23, the season was pre recorded in its entirety, with each episode indicating the day it was featuring.

=== Eviction ===
Housemate evictions occur in a program titled Big Brother Live Eviction. The housemate who has attracted the most viewer votes to evict is evicted. The eviction shows are televised each Sunday night at 7:30 pm (Australian Eastern Standard Time). Actual events start a short time before 7:30 pm. Proceedings are conducted in an auditorium in front of a live audience at Dreamworld.

These shows are broadcast live. In this show usually one housemate, but occasionally two, is evicted from the house, usually at around 7:45–8:00 pm. Shows that feature two evictions are called Double Eviction. The first Australian Double Eviction, described in advertising hyperbole as a "world first", took place during Big Brother 2002. Big Brother 2006 added the save vote, allowing viewers to vote to save a housemate as well as evict; in the final tally housemates' save votes are subtracted from their evict votes.

The 2008 season introduced a new nomination and eviction process. For the 2008 season the public vote for which housemate to save from eviction. The three housemates with the fewest save votes are nominated for eviction. The housemates then vote to evict one of the three. From week five this new routine was abandoned the original eviction procedure reinstated: housemates nominate each other and viewers may vote only to evict those nominated.

Big Brother 2012 changed the voting once again, getting viewers to save the nominees they want to stay in the house. They can only vote for those housemates that are up for nomination and the housemate with the fewest votes to save them are evicted. This format of voting has been followed in the Nine Network seasons (11–13) and the current Channel 10 reboot (2025 onwards.)

In Big Brother 2004 after the eviction of Bree Amer, it was found the votes for that eviction had been incorrectly counted. Amer had not received the most eviction votes, and she took up the option of returning to the house the following Monday night. A special eviction was held on the following Thursday evening in which the housemate to actually receive the most votes, Wesley Denning, was evicted. A representative of Legion Interactive, the company that manages eviction votes and compiles the results, appeared on the second eviction show to explain how the error occurred.

=== Finale ===
The Big Brother Finale is a significant event conducted in front of an audience at Dreamworld and broadcast live on television. The usual series host presents the finale. The television presentation has been scheduled to run as long as three hours, sometimes running even longer. The 2007 season finale was extended by almost an hour due to a delay in finalising eviction vote tallies.

In all Australian series the Finale features footage from the final day in the house, by which time there are only two housemates remaining, culminating in the announcement of the winner. Usually the runner-up leaves the house in the manner of an evicted housemate, and is interviewed by the host on stage. Later the winner is asked to leave the house, finally joining the host on stage.

The final two housemates of Big Brother 2004, Big Brother 2005 and Big Brother 2007 left the House together, and were on stage when the winner of those seasons was announced. Big Brother 2006 had featured the original format where the winner is announced while the final two housemates are in the House, and they both left separately. Big Brother 2008 had the finalists on the stage with the hosts. Season 9 retained the original format but with three housemates.

Previous housemates of the season sometimes put on a musical or dance performance. Sometimes the performance is set to popular music and is based on several of the tasks the housemates had participated in during the season. In 2006, Danielle Foote sang her single, while the other housemates did dance routines around her, using costumes and elements from various tasks of that season.

The 2007 Finale was the last Big Brother program to be hosted by series host of seven years, Gretel Killeen. In 2008, the Finale was hosted by the replacement Big Brother hosts Kyle and Jackie O. The 2008 Finale featured a special dedication to past series as the 2008 season was the last to air at that time.

Since the 2008 cancellation, each following season on the Nine Network (season 11-13), and the current 10 reboot (season 16 onwards), has featured live finales.

When the series aired on the Seven Network between 2020-23, the entire season was pre-recorded, including the finale. Australia voted which final three housemate would win, resulting in three pre recorded endings, and the finalist with the most votes to win, having their ending being aired. This was hosted by Sonia Kruger.

== Companion shows ==
=== Friday Night Live ===
Big Brother Friday Night Live is a live competition show hosted by Mike Goldman and former Big Brother 2004 housemates Ryan Fitzgerald and Bree Amer, showcasing a live housemate games competition conducted in an arena attached to the Big Brother compound every Friday evening. The housemate evicted the previous week joins the hosting panel. The show was introduced with Big Brother 2005, aired on Fridays at 7:30 p.m.

The show was originally set to be hosted by just Goldman and Fitzgerald, with Amer appearing in the first episode as the third chair would be the latest evictee and the first eviction hadn't taken place. Amer was brought back last minute for the second show when it felt like "it wasn't working" with just the duo. She then continued to appear weekly as a guest on a casual basis before officially becoming the third host for the eighth show onward.

The prize had varied throughout the series, but the winner of the overall games is usually rewarded with the following:

1. Becoming Head of House - With responsibilities and duties over the household;
2. Sharing a Rewards Room with a Housemate of their choice for the weekend - Where they would enjoy the luxaries of the room and be allowed to discuss Nomination Strategy;
3. And power over the Nomination Process.

Friday Night Live returned for Big Brother 2006. A fourth prize was added for the winner, a "luckydip" type prize draw where they are presented with three boxes, each containing a prize, and may choose one box, not knowing what any of the boxes contains. The three boxes are usually themed based on the Night's Games - with a Major Prize (usually an international holiday to enjoy a country after the conclusion of the series), a Minor Prize (which may be a smaller pize to enjoy after the series or a special privilege that may be used within the house (such as laundry services or a special dinner)), and a Booby Prize. Booby prizes have included a bow tie and a chunk of Camembert cheese. On one occasion, the three boxes were replaced with a special prize where the winner was allowed to go on an excursion outside the Big Brother House to Tiger Island at Dreamworld, where they were treated to a feast and a tiger show. They then had the entire park to themselves for a night. The winner on this occasion was Gaelan, who invited Krystal to share in his prize. On a second occasion, the winner of Friday Night Live, Jamie, was given the four usual prizes, and a fifth "mystery prize". The prize involved Jamie and the person he invited to the Rewards Room, Chris, leaving the House to get a first go on FlowRider, a new ride at Dreamworld.

For the Big Brother 2007 season Friday Night Live remained largely unchanged. For this season the prize boxes generally contained an overseas holiday, a large item such as expensive watches or a scooter, and a booby prize. But a twist in the power to change the nominations lineup made this a more valuable than ever prize for the winner of Friday Night Live in Big Brother 2007 as they were able to remove themselves altogether (if nominated) or another housemate from the nominees for that week, and replace them with another housemate, rather than in the last two series where the winner had the power to change nominations by deducting 3 points from a nominee. The Friday Night Live format was reused in the Network Ten spinoff series Friday Night Games which began in February 2006 and ended before Big Brother resumed for 2006. This weekly program is also filmed at Dreamworld, and features two teams of celebrities (who are joined by members of the public) to compete in a series of games. The program was again hosted by Goldman, Amer, and Fitzgerald.

The 2008 season of Big Brother did not include a rewards room, instead allowing the winning housemate entry to the new "Strategy Room" with one other housemate of their choice. Due to the changes in the nomination and eviction process, the winner was able to save one housemate from eviction, and votes with double points during evictions.

=== UpLate ===
Big Brother: UpLate is a late-night show screened every weeknight throughout the Big Brother seasons in 2003, 2004, 2005, 2006, 2007 and hosted by Mike Goldman. The show was first introduced with Big Brother 2003. The show aired at 11:15pm on Monday—Thursdays, 10:30pm on Fridays and 10:10pm. Episodes usually had a duration between 60 and 120 minutes.

The show features live footage from the House; interviews with evicted housemates; and brain teasers where viewers attempt to solve challenges such as word games, and may phone in for a chance to win up to $1000. An online stream was made available for the 2006 season at QuizTV.com.au specifically for viewers in states that do not receive UpLate live on television (i.e. South Australia, Western Australia and the Northern Territory), enabling them to enter the competitions. It was possible for this stream to be viewed by those outside of Australia. An online stream was made available once more for the 2007 season. During the 2007 season of Big Brother a Sunday evening edition of the show was added.

UpLate did not return for the 2008 season of Big Brother.

=== Uncut/Adults Only ===
Big Brother: Uncut was a companion programme to Big Brother that showcased adult content from the House that was unsuitable for the early evening Daily Show. This mainly consisted of footage of the housemates showering, general risque behaviour, and discussions about sexual matters. The show aired for an hour each week including commercials and was hosted by Gretel Killeen. Uncut premiered on 23 July 2001 on Network Ten and was shown aired at 9:30 pm on Thursday nights. It later switched to 9:30 pm Monday nights, and then 9:40 pm Monday nights and was rated MA15+.

During the fifth season the programme came under controversy after the viewing audience began to complain about the content shown. Communications Minister Helen Coonan asked the Australian Broadcasting Authority (ABA) to investigate whether Uncut complied with the TV industry's code of practice and to check whether current mechanisms were enough to deal with reality TV shows. Community groups complained to the industry watchdog about nudity and sexual acts that had gone to air in the uncut version of the show. Network Ten said it would cooperate with any investigation. It was later found that the network breached the code of practice but no direct punishment was imposed by the Australian Communications and Media Authority.

For the sixth season Uncut was renamed to Big Brother: Adults Only with Gretel Killeen continuing to host. The ACMA required that footage be compiled in advance so it could be edited by censors to meet the MA15+ rating. Network Ten hired two censors and crew were trained in the restrictions of the MA15+ rating. Adults Only ended early after politicians warned Network Ten that its screening of the show could harm its push for media reforms.

Uncut returned in November 2023 alongside the fifteenth season exclusively on Channel 7's streaming service 7plus.

=== Nominations ===
Big Brother Nominations was a one-hour special show that aired on Monday evenings after the Daily Show for the 2002, through to the 2007 seasons.

In the first series of Big Brother Australia there was no special show for nominations; they were simply shown as a part of the Daily Show on Tuesday evening. In the first season of the series housemates did not have to give reasons for their nominations. Subsequent seasons added a special dedicated to the nomination process. This was usually pre-taped; in Big Brother 2005 the announcement of which housemates were nominated for eviction was presented live. For the first half of the 2008 season, the housemates no longer nominated, and there was no special nominations show. When nominations resumed in the middle of that season they were shown as part of the Monday evening Daily Show. Where there was special dedicated to the nomination process, this episode presented footage of the housemates as they explain in the Diary Room who they nominate for eviction.

In the nomination process, housemates each have three points to vote for two other housemates. Their first nomination assigns two points to one housemate, while the second nomination gives another housemate one point. If Big Brother feels a housemate's nomination is not clear and concise, he may decide to give the nominating housemate one nomination point. The three housemates with the highest number of points are revealed to the housemates. In the case of a third-place tie, all those tying for third place are eligible for eviction. On these occasions, more than three housemates would be up for eviction.

An innovation introduced in Big Brother 2005 was the Three Point Twist whereby the winner of Friday Night Live must subtract three nomination points from one of the nominated housemates. If they themselves are included in the original lineup of potential evictees, they may opt to subtract the points from themselves. This occurs after the initial nominations have been announced to all housemates, and while housemates may not discuss which housemate they remove points from, where the line-up changes, it is often clear which housemate has had their nomination points deducted. The three housemates with the highest number of nomination points after the Three Point Twist will face eviction. Again, in the case of a third-place tie, more than three housemates may be up for eviction. The Three Point Twist got its name as part of a sponsorship deal with KFC. Big Brother 2007 introduced a new version of the "nominations twist" where the winner of Friday Night Games must now entirely remove a housemate who is nominated for eviction, and then nominate a new housemate to be up for eviction.

For the first five weeks of the Big Brother 2008 season, there were no housemate nominations viewers could vote to nominate, and the housemates voted to evict. Those housemate eviction votes were delivered on air during the Sunday evening eviction show. Halfway through the season nominations made a return after the eviction process was reverted to the original format in which the housemates nominate and the public may vote to evict. There was no special show for the nominations in the 2008 season; they were screened in an extended (one-hour) Daily Show on Monday night.

Camilla Halliwell holds the record for the most times nominated for eviction. Halliwell, who finished runner-up in the 2006 season, faced the public vote ten times. Rory Ammon, who appears in the eighth season of the show, faced possible eviction on nine occasions.

=== Confidential ===
Big Brother Confidential is a mature late-night show narrated by Mike Goldman that premiered on 22 August 2012 as a companion show of the ninth season of the programme. The series is styled with a series of random vignettes showing housemates getting up to trouble or doing something funny. Mike Goldman narrates each sketch which often begins with an animation making a joke out of what will be shown. Reviews for the programme were negative when compared to previous companion shows that aired during Network Ten's run of the show like Uncut and Adults Only. Initially the series was given an M classification when it premiered in its original Wednesday 10:10pm timeslot but after one week Nine moved it to air on Thursdays at 8pm. This resulted in its classification being changed from M to PG which was the same as the family-friendly 7pm daily shows. The move was seen as a contradiction to what Nine's Director of Programming and Production told Australian website TV Tonight prior to the launch of the show's launch a month prior in regards to adult debate and discussions that "wouldn't play out in a PG slot".

=== Showdown ===
Big Brother Showdown in its original format is a 60-minute Saturday-night take on Friday Night Live hosted by Shelley Craft with commentation from Mike Goldman and 2012 housemate Michael Beveridge. The games occurred in the house each Friday, but aired Saturdays. The original format lasted 3 weeks.

In Showdown's new format, Showdown is recorded on Wednesday, and aired as part of the Big Brother daily show on Thursday. The new format was not hosted.

=== Late Night Feast ===
Big Brother Late Night Feast is a late-night adult-orientated weekly episode, aired every Tuesday starting from week 4, at 9.30 pm. This show follows along the lines of Ten's long running Uncut show, but with a point of difference not to focus on nudity.

== Panel shows ==
=== Saturday ===
Big Brother Saturday was a one-hour long show aired on Saturday evenings during Big Brother 2001, with Gretel Killeen presenting an overview of press discussions of the series that week, interviews with fans by reporter Sami Lukis, and stories about the activities of evicted housemates. The show featured little actual footage originating from the Big Brother House itself.

This show did not return after the first series, largely because Network Ten acquired the rights to televise Saturday night Australian Football League games after the first series of Big Brother ended, with these telecasts taking the show's timeslot.

=== The Insider ===
The Insider was a panel-type show introduced for the 2003 season hosted by Tim Ferguson with additional gossip and discussion about the show. Frequently the week's evicted housemate would be one of the show's guests.

=== Big Brother's Big Mouth ===
Big Brother's Big Mouth is a panel show introduced for the 2008 season of the show, based on the Big Brother UK show of the same title. The show was hosted by Tony Squires and Rebecca Wilson with comedian Tom Gleeson and journalist and Big Brother 5 Housemate Tim Brunero joining as panellists. It also features evicted housemates. Big Mouth aired at 9.30pm each Monday night from 6 May 2008 to 23 May 2008. Due to a ratings decline it was moved to 10.00pm Monday starting 30 June 2008, with new series Mark Loves Sharon taking its original slot. Each week different former Australian housemates were guest panel members. There was a total of 11 one hour episodes.
