= Download (TV series) =

- Also known as: Friday Night Download (2007)
- Genre: Improvisational comedy
- Created by: Endemol Southern Star
- Presented by: Mike Goldman; Ryan Fitzgerald; Bree Amer
- Country of origin: Australia
- Original language: English
- No. of seasons: 2
- No. of episodes: 8

Production
- Production locations: Sydney, New South Wales
- Running time: Approx. 42 minutes (60 minutes Including commercials)
- Production company: Endemol Southern Star

Original release
- Network: Network Ten
- Release: 26 October 2007 – 24 October 2008

Related
- Friday Night Games; Big Brother – Friday Night Live

Download (formerly Friday Night Download) is an Australian TV show hosted by Friday Night Games hosts Mike Goldman, Ryan Fitzgerald and Bree Amer. The show first aired on 26 October 2007. A second series began on 17 October 2008, but the show was pulled from schedules only two episodes into its run.

== Overview ==
Download stole video clips collected from the Internet, such as those hosted on YouTube and Google Video. The show also prompted viewers to submit their own videos to the show.

Download also labels the hosts' top 5 favourite video downloads, each one shown just before a commercial break.

== Reception ==
The Sydney Morning Herald TV critic noted that the videos shown on the show could be viewed as easily on the internet without advertisement breaks, and as such claimed it should be "hosed off the pavement forthwith".

The show only averaged 748,000 viewers on its premiere night and was beaten by the Seven Network's Better Homes and Gardens. Although rating good enough for Ten to retain the show for their 2008 lineup, the show was axed when it slumped to 526,000 viewers in its last aired episode.

== See also ==
- i-Caught
