= Mike Goldman =

Australian television and radio host (born 1972)

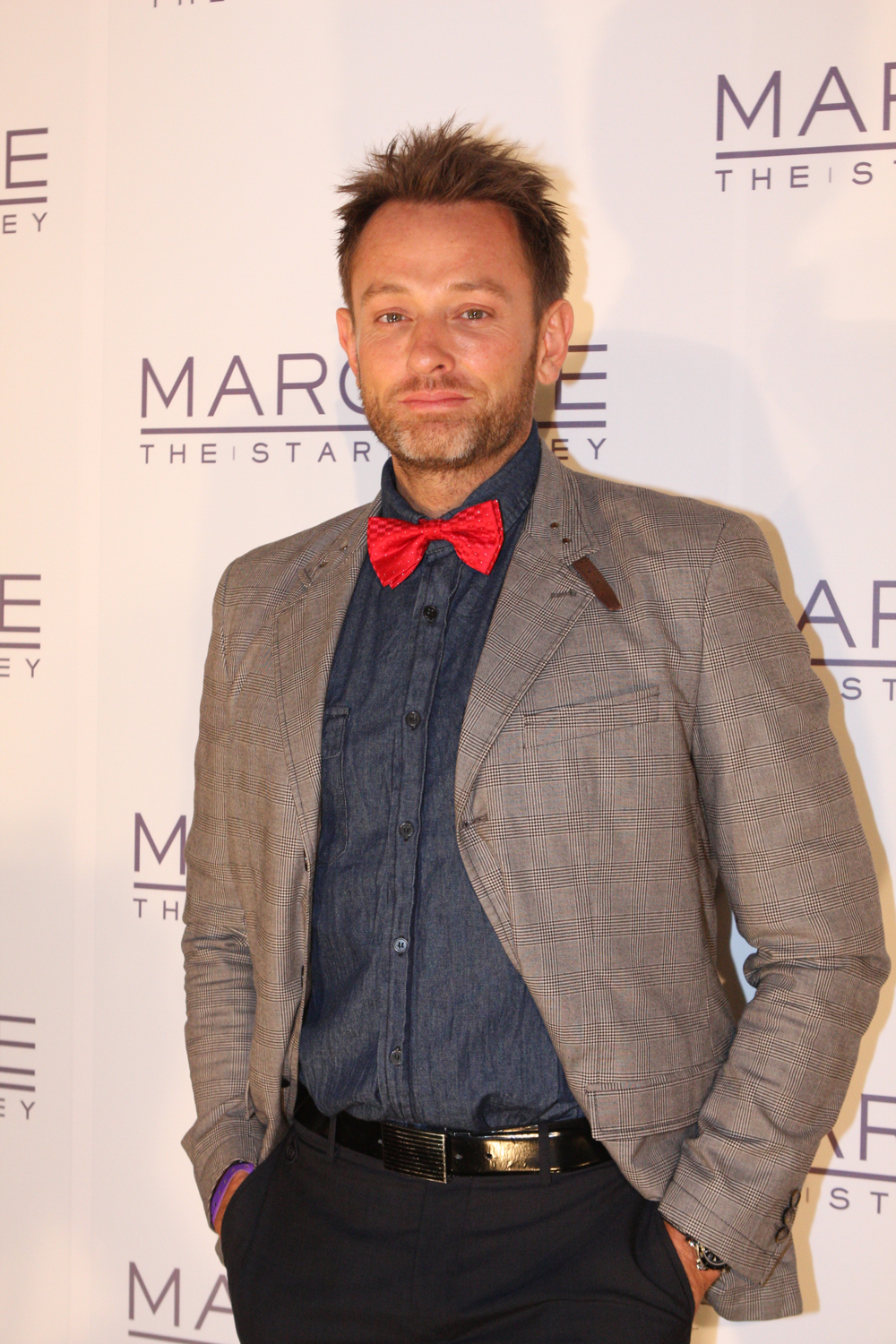
- Hollywood Celebrities Open Marquee – The Star, Sydney, Australia, 2012
- Born: Michael Goldman; 7 November 1972 (age 54); Gold Coast, Queensland, Australia
- Occupations: Television host; radio host; actor; voice-over
- Known for: Young Rock (2021–2023); Big Brother Australia (2001–2008, 2012–2014, 2025); Friday Night Games (2006); Joker Poker (2006); Download (2007–2008)
- Spouse: Bianca Zouppas (m. 2019)
- Children: 1
- Parent(s): Grant Goldman; Erica Hammond
- Website: www.onthemike.com

Michael Aaron Goldman (born 7 November 1972) is an Australian actor, television and radio host and voice-over artist. He is best known for his involvement in Big Brother Australia, in narrating the Daily Hightlight episodes as well as hosting many of the companion shows - Including the live competition series Friday Night Live and the live late-night interactive series UpLate.

He has also appeared in television roles, mini-series and films like Young Rock, The Wilds and A Place to Call Home. He is the son of television and radio personality Grant Goldman and weather presenter, former Miss Australian Beach Girl Erica Hammond.

== Career ==
=== Television ===
Mike Goldman played a cop in Dangerous Animals, American lawyer in episodes 6 and 7 on Young Rock 2 on NBC/Peacock. Game show host on The Wilds on Amazon Prime, In Joe VS Carole on Binge he was an exotic wildlife auctioneer and A Place to Call Home on 7 network played an American studio boss. Goldman was a speaker at SXSW 2025. An actor and Voiceover artist, Goldman's first role in television was in a 1991 episode of Home and Away playing a character named Gavin. Goldman was also a live announcer in an American accent on the FIBA World Cup on ESPN2 USA and court side announcer for The Sydney Kings Basketball. He then spent three years at Sydney Film and TV Academy.

Since 1997 Goldman has voiced TV commercials for Amart Sports, and later Rebel

In 2001 Goldman became the narrator of Big Brother Australia, as well as other behind-the-scenes roles. From 2003 until 2008 he was the host of Big Brother spin-off UpLate. In 2005 until 2008 he became the host of Big Brother Friday Night Live with former Housemates Bree Amer and Ryan Fitzgerald. This also led to hosting Friday Night Games in 2006 with Amer and Fitzgerald. The trio also presented Download in 2007 and 2008. He remained the narrator of Big Brother until the show was cancelled at the end of the 2008 season.

In 2006 Goldman became the local narrator of Meerkat Manor, dubbing his voiceover in place of that of Bill Nighy in the British show. In 2007, he hosted the second season of Joker Poker alongside poker pro Lee Nelson.

In 2012 Goldman returned to his post as narrator of Big Brother when the show returned on the Nine Network. He also returned in 2013 as commentator of the weekly House games night, now rebranded as Showdown alongside Shelley Craft and former Housemate Michael Beveridge.

In 2019 Goldman appeared in an episode of A Place to Call Home. In 2020 he appeared in single episodes of Wentworth, Monsters of Man and The Wilds. He also presented online Big Brother companion series The Big Bro Show for the Seven News website.

Goldman returned to narrate Big Brother in 2025, with the show returning to Network 10 and Dreamworld.

=== Film ===
Goldman appeared in 2013 film Monsters Of Man starring Neal McDonough He was also in 2013 film Goddess starring Ronan Keating and Magda Szubanski and starred as himself in indie film Shooting Goldman in 2014 that played film.

=== Radio & Podcasts ===
Goldman's first job in radio was for 2SM in Sydney working in the office and helping a blind DJ by putting Braille titles on the CDs and operating the CD player for the overnight shift. When that DJ didn't show up, Goldman was put in charge of the shift instead.

From 1994 until 1998 he hosted the Triple M night show The Rubber Room.

Goldman hosted the summer breakfast radio show on 2Day FM in 2007-08 with Brian McFadden and Ricki-Lee Coulter.

Until January 2010 Goldman was the breakfast host for the Sydney Digital dance radio Gorilla on weekday evenings. He also hosted the drive program for Campbelltown station C91.3.

Mike currently hosts a podcast called On The Mike where he interviews a range of different personalities.

== Personal life ==
Goldman began dating actress and comedian Bianca Zouppas in 2016 after meeting in an acting class; the couple married in 2019. Their first child, a son, was born via in-vitro fertilization in 2024. Prior to Jagger's birth, Zouppas had documented various complications surrounding the couple's efforts to conceive a child, including Zouppas suffering from severe endometriosis and Goldman's low sperm count, through her podcast series IVF - What Your Mumma Went Through.

== Bibliography ==
=== Contributor ===
- Goldman, Mike (2007). "Contributor". Laugh Even Louder!. By Camp Quality. Gosford, New South Wales: Scholastic Australia Pty Limited. ISBN 978-1-74169-022-4.
