= The Up-Late Game Show =

- Genre: Live, Phone-in Quiz show
- Presented by: Simon Deering; Rob Rigley; Chrissy Bray
- Country of origin: Australia
- Original language: English
- No. of seasons: 2

Production
- Production locations: Canberra, Australian Capital Territory
- Running time: 120 minutes
- Production company: Southern Star Group

Original release
- Network: Network Ten
- Release: 16 August 2005 – 15 December 2006

The Up-Late Game Show was a late night interactive television quiz program shown in Australia on Network Ten, written and hosted by Big Brother Australia 2005 contestant Simon Deering, commonly known by the nickname Hotdogs. The show's format had the host presenting simple puzzles which viewers could attempt to solve over the phone. Successfully solving a puzzle would result in a cash prize for the contestant.

The show debuted on 16 August 2005, the day after the Big Brother 2005 finale. The first caller in was Big Brother winner Greg Mathew, who congratulated Hotdogs on his new show. The first series ended 22 April 2006 to make way for Big Brother UpLate.

The second series started on 31 July 2006, the day of the Big Brother Australia 2006 finale, with Deering returning as host. From August 2006, Hotdogs was joined by co-hosts Big Brother 2006 housemate Rob Rigley and singer Chrissy Bray. On Monday 7 August and Tuesday 26 September former Big Brother contestant Krystal Forscutt co-hosted the show.

The show's format initially had the host sitting at a table, with a bowl of popcorn and a mug. After the Christmas and New Year break, the format had changed to Deering walking around the set.

In 2006, the show was made available via Internet streaming at QuizTV.com.au, the same site that Big Brother UpLate 2006 streamed from when Big Brother was in season, for the benefit of those not in states that receive The Up-Late Game Show live. It was also aired for a short period on Pay-TV channel the Expo Channel, featuring content not seen on the Network Ten version, and with a different host.

The Up-Late Game Show went to air for the final time on Friday 15 December 2006.

The show was broadcast from the Southern Cross Broadcasting studios in Canberra, Australian Capital Territory.

== Criticism ==
On 11 August 2006, satirical comedy series The Chaser's War on Everything featured a segment on the influx of late-night phone-in quiz shows. The segment mocked the standard of all late-night quiz programs and their questions. Accusing this style of programming of making money by "hardly ever letting callers through", therefore limiting the chances for people to win prizes. The segment showed taped footage of a Quizmania two-minute bonus round, where host Amy Parks stalled for the entire length of the round and no calls were taken, despite the claim of taking "as many calls as possible". To add further to this, Julian Morrow and Chas Licciardello claimed to have been calling the Up-late Game Show hundreds of times during this segment. Many jokes were also made during the length of the first season about Hotdogs himself, with Chris Taylor appearing shocked that Hotdogs failed to take out a Logie.

Similar complaints have been voiced by Australian entertainment critics.

Current affairs show Today Tonight also featured a segment in mid-2006 where viewers complained that despite calling numerous times, they were never put through to the show.

== See also ==
- List of Australian game shows
