= Endemol Southern Star =

- Formerly: Southern Star Endemol (2000–2004)
- Type: Joint venture
- Industry: Television
- Founded: 2000
- Defunct: 2010
- Fate: Closed and absorbed into Southern Star Group
- Successors: Endemol Australia; Endemol Shine Australia
- Headquarters: Sydney, New South Wales, Australia
- Services: Television production
- Owners: Southern Star Group; Endemol

Endemol Southern Star (also known as Southern Star Endemol until February 2004) was an Australian television production company made up of a joint venture between Australian production company Southern Star Group and its Endemol. On 23 February 2004, Southern Star Endemol changed its name to Endemol Southern Star with both names switching their places. In 2010, the joint company ceased to exist after Endemol bought Southern Star from Fairfax in January 2009. Following this, all programmes under the ESS name were credited to Southern Star.

== Programs ==
- Big Brother Australia – Network Ten (2001–2008), Nine Network (2012–2014), Seven Network (2020–2023) as Endemol Shine Australia
- Y? – Nine Network (1999–2002)
- Burgo's Catch Phrase – Nine Network (1997–2003)
- Deal or No Deal – Seven Network (2003–2013, joint by a Seven News production)
- Fear Factor – Nine Network (2002)
- Shafted – Nine Network (2002)
- Friday Night Games – Network Ten (2006)
- The Power of One – The Comedy Channel (2006–2007)
- Ready Steady Cook – Network Ten (2005–2013)
- The Up-Late Game Show – Network Ten (2005)
- 1 vs. 100 – Nine Network (2007–2008)
- Download – Network Ten (2007–2008)
- Gladiators – Seven Network (2008)
- Wipeout Australia – Nine Network (2009)
- Beauty and the Geek Australia – Seven Network (2009–2014)
