= Big Brother 4 nominations table =

Big Brother 4 nominations table may refer to:

- Big Brother Australia 2004 nominations table
- Big Brother 2003 nominations table (UK)
