= Big Brother 2004 =

Big Brother 2004 may refer to two reality television shows:

- Big Brother (Australian TV series) season 4
- Big Brother (British TV series) series 5
