= Harsh Reality (podcast) =

Podcast about a television show

Harsh Reality: The Story of Miriam Rivera

Cast and voices
- Hosted by: Trace Lysette

Production
- Production: Novel

Publication
- No. of episodes: 7
- Original release: November 29 – December 27, 2021
- Provider: Wondery

Related
- Website: wondery.com/shows/the-story-of-miriam-rivera/

Harsh Reality: The Story of Miriam Rivera is a 2021 podcast produced by Novel, provided by Wondery. The series is hosted by Trace Lysette and focuses on the show There's Something About Miriam and the life of Mexican transgender model Miriam Rivera.

== Synopsis ==
The series covers the life of the controversial British reality dating show There's Something About Miriam, as well as the life of its star, Mexican model Miriam Rivera. The series also examines the topics of gender, sexuality, and the decision-making process that went into the show's creation and filming.

The series begins with a look into Miriam's early life, from her childhood in Mexico to her time in the United States and participation in the House of Xtravaganza. Miriam was eventually discovered by British television producer Remy Blumenfeld, who planned on making her the focus of a dating game show. He and the other show creators wanted to treat There's Something About Miriam as a social experiment about gender and sexuality. They chose not to reveal that Miriam was a transgender woman until the final episode, upon which point all of the bachelors would be informed. Great effort was taken to keep this secret and to this end none of the contestants were allowed to spend much time with Miriam. Contestants who suspected were quickly eliminated from the show. Miriam became particularly close with Tom despite these limitations. Lysette compares this to a relationship Miriam had while she was a teenager attending high school in the United States as an undocumented immigrant. Miriam did not tell her classmates or the boy she was dating that she was assigned male at birth. Upon discovering this the boy reacted with disgust and told others at school, many of whom reacted similarly. Miriam chose to drop out of school.

As the show's final episode approached the crew brought in a psychiatrist who had experience working with reality shows. According to Lysette, the producers had not brought in anyone to counsel the contestants or ensure that they were appropriate for the show prior to this point. The psychiatrist, who was interviewed for the podcast, felt that this led to the events that occurred after filming was completed; contestant Scott was so enraged by the revelations that he destroyed the set. After the contestants returned home, they were informed that they had a case for a lawsuit, even before the show was aired on television.

== Release ==
Harsh Reality released its first episode on November 29, 2021, and ran for six episodes.

== Episodes ==
| No. | Title | Original release date |
|---|---|---|
| 1 | "Something About Miriam" | November 29, 2021 |
| 2 | "Outlaw Superstar" | November 29, 2021 |
| 3 | "Champagne, Canapés and Clubbing" | December 6, 2021 |
| 4 | "Sh*t Show" | December 13, 2021 |
| 5 | "Scene of a Crime?" | December 13, 2021 |
| 6 | "Speed Angel" | December 27, 2021 |
| 7 | "Behind the Lens" | December 27, 2021 |

== Reception ==
Them praised Harsh Reality, stating that "It’s a rare show of any kind that brings trans talent like this together on every level of production, and the combination pays off, particularly during interviews with the cis people who were involved in creating There’s Something About Miriam." The Sunday Times was also favorable, giving it four out of five stars, as was The Guardian.
