= Big Brother (Australian TV series) season 5 =

Big Brother
- Season 5
- Presented by: Gretel Killeen
- No. of days: 100
- No. of housemates: 20
- Winner: Greg Mathew
- Runner-up: Tim Brunero
- Companion shows: Big Brother Nominations; Big Brother: Uncut; Big Brother: UpLate; Friday Night Live
- No. of episodes: 141 (+ 70 UpLate)

Release
- Original network: Network Ten
- Original release: 8 May – 15 August 2005

Season chronology
- ← Previous; Season 4 Next → Season 6

The fifth season of the Australian reality television series, Big Brother, also known as Big Brother 2005, began on 8 May 2005, with housemates going into the House the day before, and finished on 15 August 2005, lasting 101 days. The season was aired on Network Ten in Australia, and TV-2 in New Zealand with a four-week delay. Promos for the show suggested that Big Brother would be different this year, and phrases such as "Assume Nothing, Expect Anything", "Let's Play" and "Think Again" were used throughout the series, especially during Opening Night. The winner was announced on the finale that was watched by 2.282 million Australian viewers.

The theme for this season was "single, sexy and competitive". Auditions for housemates were held in March 2005. In a departure from usual procedure, candidates were not required to send in videos of themselves as had been the case for prior auditions. Instead, the producers toured major Australian cities and conducted interviews. They searched for attractive singles that were willing to have sexual relations on camera. The fifth season marked a noticeable change in the portrayal of 'Big Brother'. Compared to earlier seasons, the voice, provided by Nick Colquhoun, adopted a much stricter and more authoritarian tone, often described by viewers as "evil". During this season, Big Brother frequently imposed fines and penalties on housemates for rule breaches, reinforcing a tougher approach to house discipline. This stricter style and vocal delivery continued in the following two seasons, with Big Brother maintaining the same stern tone and enforcement of rules throughout the 2006 and 2007 series.

The season came under controversy after viewers complained about nudity and sexual acts shown on 'Uncut'. Communications Minister Helen Coonan asked the Australian Broadcasting Authority (ABA) to investigate whether Uncut complied with the TV industry's code of practice. It was later found that Network Ten breached the code of practice but no direct punishment was imposed by the Australian Communications and Media Authority (ACMA).

== Changes and additions ==
=== Fines ===
On Opening Night, it was revealed that A$5,000 would be subtracted from the $1 million prize money every time the housemates broke a rule. Such rules included discussing nominations, which must remain secret, not giving adequate reasons for nominating, and forgetting to wear microphones at all times. Michelle was known for being the housemate to get the most such fines—$60,000. Geneva had the least amount of fines $15,000, two in the early days at the house and one near the end of her eviction.

=== The Logans ===
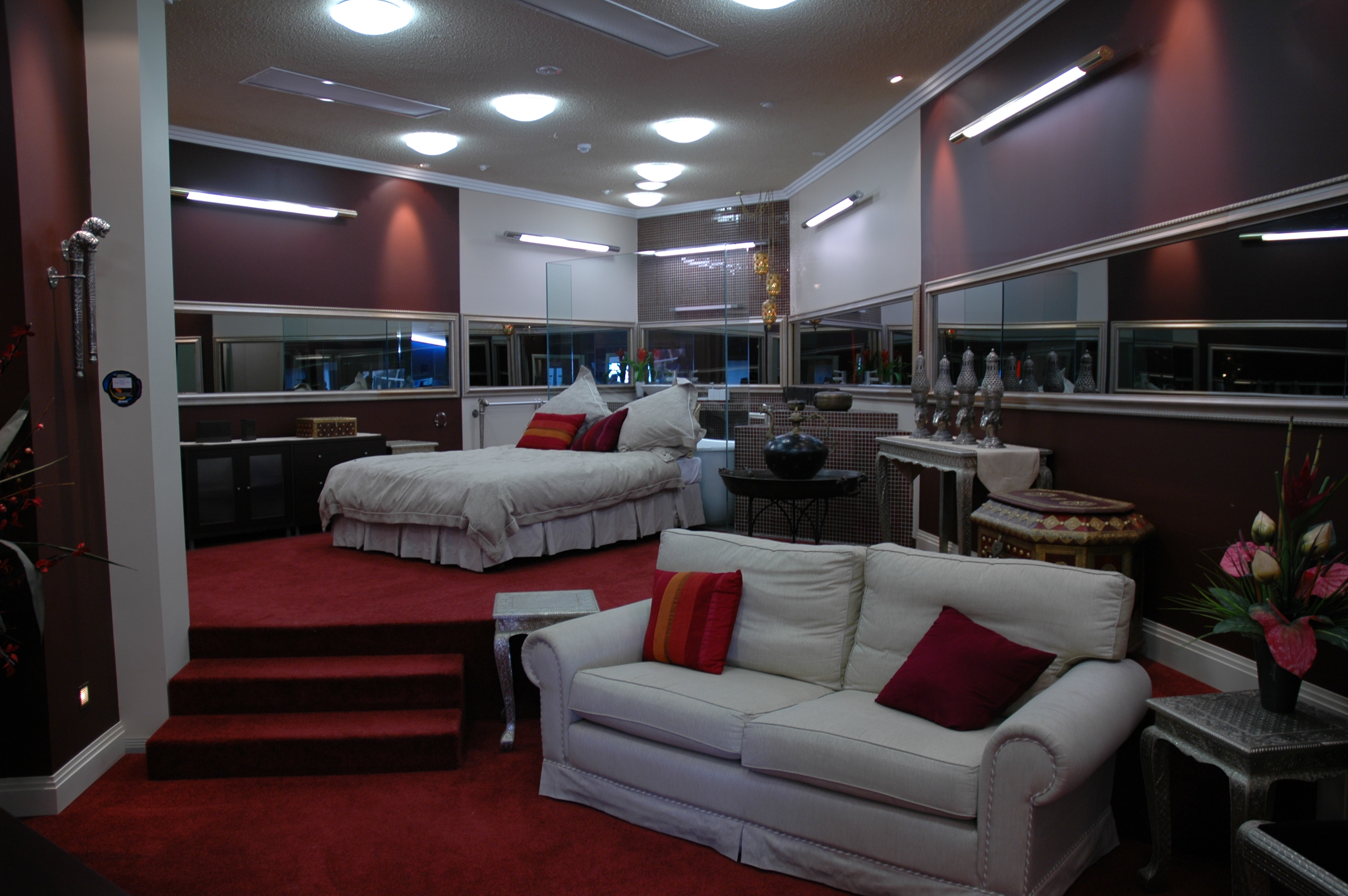
The Rewards Room

It was revealed that twins would be entering the House, regularly changing places without the other housemates knowing—this was a twist first used on the fifth American series of Big Brother. Greg and David entered the House as a single person named Logan (their shared middle name). Their task was to remain undetected for two weeks while swapping places at Big Brother's command, and as a reward, they would participate as separate housemates. The secret of the twins was discovered one week into the series by housemate Glenn, and this was revealed during Lies Exposed.

As a result, both Logans were able to continue living in the House, but would be treated as a single person in matters such as evictions and nominations. Late in the series, a special eviction was held where one twin was evicted based on the votes of the other housemates, and the remaining twin was allowed to continue in the House as a normal housemate. During this eviction process, David was evicted. However, because Greg was voted the winner, both David and Greg shared the prize equally.

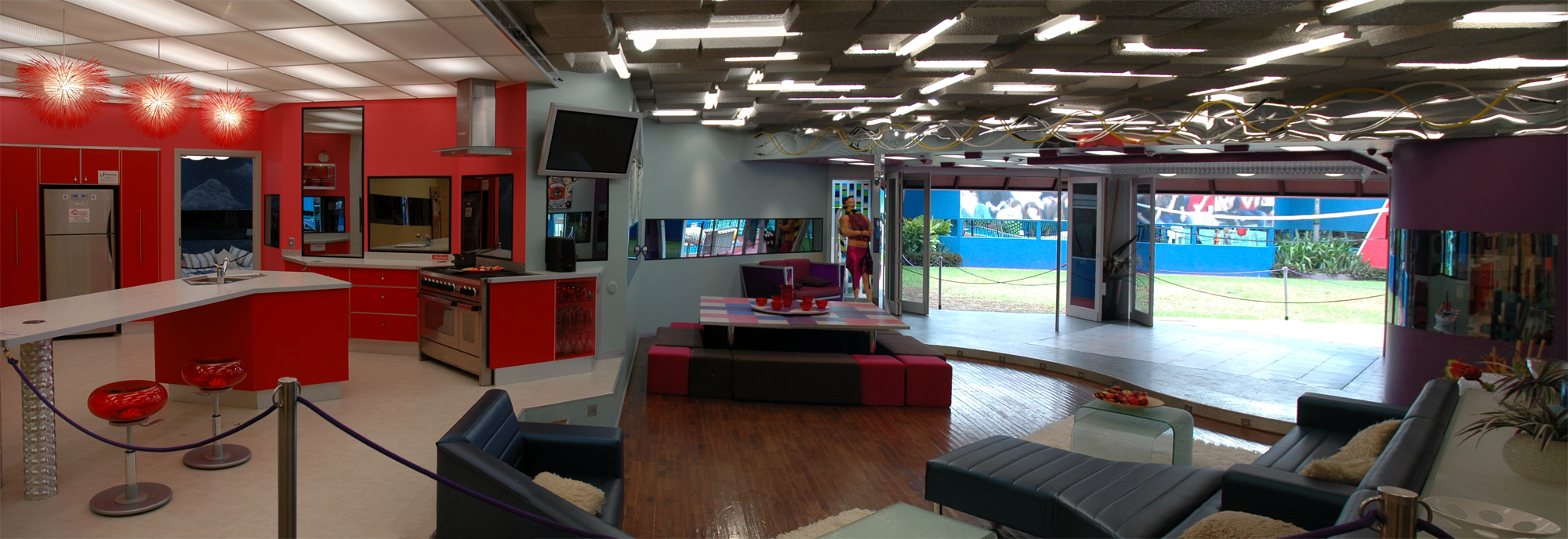
Interior of the Big Brother house in 2005

== Housemates ==
Name	Age on entry	Day entered	Day exited	Result
Greg Mathew	23	0	100	Winner
Tim Brunero	27	0	100	Runner-up
Vesna Tosevska	27	25	99	Evicted
Melanie Smerdon	19	53	92	Evicted
Richelle "Kate" Benson	21	0	85	Evicted
Christie Mills	19	0	78	Evicted
Rita Lazzarotto	29	53	78	Evicted
David Mathew	23	0	74	Evicted (Note: David was evicted on Day 74 but as his twin was voted the winner of Big Brother, he split the prize with Greg.)
Dean Glucina	24	0	71	Evicted
Simon "Hotdogs" Deering	27	0	64	Evicted
Heath Tournier	20	53	59	Evicted
Glenn Dallinger	21	0	57	Evicted
Geneva Loader	19	0	50	Evicted
Rachael Burns	21	25	43	Evicted
Michelle Carew-Gibson	24	0	36	Evicted
Michael Farnsworth	27	0	29	Evicted
Jane "Gianna" Pattison	24	0	22	Evicted
Angela Aiken	29	0	15	Evicted
Constance Hall	21	0	10	Evicted
Nelson Russell	23	0	10	Evicted

== Friday Night Live themes and winners ==
Week	Theme	Winner	Runner up
1	Romans	Glenn	Logan David
2	50's	Gianna	Tim
3	Wacky Athletics	Michelle	Hotdogs
4	Italy	Rachael	Tim
5	Country Fair	Glenn	Christie
6	Nautical	Dean	Rachael
7	Boot Camp	Kate	Tim
8	Asian	Logan Greg	Heath
9	Life in Space	Logan David	Christie
10	Winter Wonderland	Logan Greg	Christie
11	DIY	Tim	Melanie
12	Australian	Tim	Logan Greg
13	Mad Max	All Star Team	Housemate Team
14	Prize Fight	Housemates won $236,000/$400,000	

== Nominations table ==
Color key:

Winner
Runner-up
Friday Night Live (FNL) winner
Nominated
Exempt
No Nominations
Intruder/Twin Vote
Evicted

	Week 1	Week 2	Week 3	Week 4	Week 5	Week 6	Week 7	Week 8	Week 9	Week 10	Week 11		Week 12	Week 13	Week 14		Nomination points received
	Week 1	Week 2	Week 3	Week 4	Week 5	Week 6	Week 7	Week 8	Week 9	Week 10	Fake Nominations	Twin Eviction	Week 12	Week 13	Day 99	Finale	Nomination points received
FNL Winner	(none)	Glenn	Gianna	Michelle	Rachael	Glenn	Dean	Kate	Logan (Greg)	Logan (David)	Logan (Greg)	(none)	Tim	Tim	All-Stars won $20,000	Housemates won $236,000	Nomination points received
Greg	2-in-1 connection with David (Days 1–74)											Nominated	2–Vesna; 1–Melanie	2–Vesna; 1–Melanie	No nominations	Winners (Day 100)	6
Tim	No nominations	2–Angela; 1–Gianna	2–Geneva; 1–Dean	2–Dean; 1–Hotdogs	2–Dean; 1–Christie	2–Dean; 1–Christie	2–Dean; 1–Geneva	2–Dean; 1–Christie	2–Kate; 1–Dean	2–Dean; 1–Christie	~~2–Rita~~; ~~1–Christie~~	David	2–Melanie; 1–Vesna	2–Vesna; 1–Greg	No nominations	Runner-up (Day 100)	21
Vesna	Not in house				Exempt	2–Dean; 1–Geneva	2–Geneva; 1–Logan	2–Dean; 1–Logan	2–Kate; 1–Logan	2–Logan; 1–Dean	~~2–Rita~~; ~~1–Logan~~	Greg	2–Kate; 1–Greg	2–Greg; 1–Tim	No nominations	Evicted (Day 99)	32
Melanie	Not in house								Exempt	2–Logan; 1–Rita	~~2–Rita~~; ~~1–Logan~~	David	2–Vesna; 1–Tim	2–Vesna; 1–Tim	Evicted (Day 92)		6
Kate	No nominations	2–Tim; 1–Geneva	2–Gianna; 1–Geneva	2–Dean; 1–Tim	2–Hotdogs; 1–Christie	2–Rachael; 1–Christie	2–Vesna; 1–Hotdogs	2–Glenn; 1–Dean	2–Hotdogs; 1–Vesna	2–Rita; 1–Christie	~~2–Rita~~; ~~1–Christie~~	Greg	2–Greg; 1–Vesna	Evicted (Day 85)			27
Christie	No nominations	2–Tim; 1–Michael	2–Hotdogs; 1–Dean	2–Tim; 1–Michael	2–Michelle; 1–Kate	2–Rachael; 1–Vesna	2–Hotdogs; 1–Vesna	2–Dean; 1–Hotdogs	2–Kate; 1–Hotdogs	2–Kate; 1–Tim	~~2–Rita~~; ~~1–Kate~~	David	Evicted (Day 78)				24
Rita	Not in house								Exempt	2–Melanie; 1–Kate	~~2–Kate~~; ~~1–Christie~~	David	Evicted (Day 78)				15
David	2-in-1 connection with Greg (Days 1–74)											Nominated	Evicted (Day 74)				N/A
Logan (Greg & David)	No nominations	2–Christie; 1–Geneva	2–Gianna; 1–Michelle	2–Geneva; 1–Michael	2–Michelle; 1–Hotdogs	2–Geneva; 1–Hotdogs	2–Hotdogs; 1–Vesna	2–Kate; 1–Hotdogs	2–Kate; 1–Vesna	2–Vesna; 1–Kate	~~2–Vesna~~; ~~1–Rita~~	2-in-1 connection ended (Days 74)					12
Dean	Holding; Room	Nominated	2–Gianna; 1–Tim	2–Christie; 1–Michelle	2–Michelle; 1–Tim	2–Rachael; 1–Vesna	2–Vesna; 1–Tim	2–Vesna; 1–Christie	2–Tim; 1–Vesna	2–Tim; 1–Rita	Evicted (Day 71)						31
Hotdogs	No nominations	2–Geneva; 1–Angela	2–Michael; 1–Geneva	2–Christie; 1–Michael	2–Michelle; 1–Christie	2–Rachael; 1–Glenn	2–Geneva; 1–Glenn	2–Kate; 1–Christie	2–Kate; 1–Tim	Evicted (Day 64)							31
Heath	Not in house								Exempt	Evicted (Day 59)							N/A
Glenn	No nominations	2–Geneva; 1–Gianna	2–Hotdogs; 1–Geneva	2–Christie; 1–Dean	2–Geneva; 1–Dean	2–Christie; 1–Geneva	2–Hotdogs; 1–Vesna	2–Kate; 1–Christie	Evicted (Day 57)								10
Geneva	No nominations	2–Michelle; 1–Hotdogs	2–Hotdogs; 1–Gianna	2–Glenn; 1–Dean	2–Glenn; 1–Kate	2–Rachael; 1–Hotdogs	2–Vesna; 1–Hotdogs	Evicted (Day 50)									29
Rachael	Not in house				Exempt	2–Geneva; 1–Logan	Evicted (Day 43)										10
Michelle	No nominations	2–Angela; 1–Gianna	2–Michael; 1–Dean	2–Dean; 1–Michael	2–Hotdogs; 1–Logan	Evicted (Day 36)											16
Michael	No nominations	2–Michelle; 1–Hotdogs	2–Hotdogs; 1–Gianna	2–Glenn; 1–Logan	Evicted (Day 29)												10
Gianna	No nominations	2–Tim; 1–Geneva	2–Geneva; 1–Michael	Evicted (Day 22)													12
Angela	No nominations	2–Michelle; 1–Gianna	Evicted (Day 15)														5
Constance	Holding; Room	Evicted (Day 10)															N/A
Nelson	Holding; Room	Evicted (Day 10)															N/A
Notes	1	2	none		3	none			4, 5	none	6	7	none		8		
Nominated (pre-twist)	(none)	Geneva, Michelle, Tim	Geneva, Gianna, Hotdogs	Christie, Dean, Glenn, Michael	Christie, Dean, Hotdogs, Michelle	Christie, Dean, Geneva, Rachael	Geneva, Hotdogs, Vesna	Christie, Dean, Kate	Hotdogs, Kate, Tim, Vesna	Kate, Logan, Rita	All Housemates	(none)	Greg, Melanie, Vesna	Greg, Tim, Vesna	(none)		
Power Outcome	(none)	Michelle	Gianna	Glenn	Christie	Dean	Geneva	Christie	Tim	Logan	No; Immunity	(none)	Greg	Tim	(none)		
Against public vote	Constance, Dean, Nelson	Angela, Dean, Geneva, Tim	Geneva, Gianna, Hotdogs, Michael	Christie, Dean, Michael	Dean, Hotdogs, Michelle	Christie, Geneva, Rachael	Dean, Geneva, Hotdogs, Vesna	Dean, Glenn, Hotdogs, Kate, Vesna	Heath, Melanie	Dean, Kate, Rita, Tim	All; Housemates	David, Greg	Kate, Melanie, Vesna	Greg, Melanie, Vesna	All Housemates	All Housemates	
Against public vote	Constance, Dean, Nelson	Angela, Dean, Geneva, Tim	Geneva, Gianna, Hotdogs, Michael	Christie, Dean, Michael	Dean, Hotdogs, Michelle	Christie, Geneva, Rachael	Dean, Geneva, Hotdogs, Vesna	Dean, Glenn, Hotdogs, Kate, Vesna	Hotdogs, Kate, Vesna	Dean, Kate, Rita, Tim	All; Housemates	David, Greg	Kate, Melanie, Vesna	Greg, Melanie, Vesna	All Housemates	All Housemates	
Evicted	Nelson; 52% to evict	Angela; 41% to evict	Gianna; 53% to evict	Michael; 48% to evict	Michelle; 41% to evict	Rachael; 47% to evict	Geneva; 31.3% to evict	Glenn; 49% to evict	Heath; Australia’s choice to evict	Dean; 52% to evict	Rita; 35% (out of 7) to evict	David; 4 of 6 votes to evict	Kate; 56% to evict	Melanie; 59% to evict	Vesna; 39% to evict	Tim; 55% to evict	
Evicted	Constance; 32% to evict	Angela; 41% to evict	Gianna; 53% to evict	Michael; 48% to evict	Michelle; 41% to evict	Rachael; 47% to evict	Geneva; 31.3% to evict	Glenn; 49% to evict	Hotdogs; 53% to evict	Dean; 52% to evict	Christie; 39% (out of 6) to evict	David; 4 of 6 votes to evict	Kate; 56% to evict	Melanie; 59% to evict	Vesna; 39% to evict	Greg; 45% to evict	

=== Notes ===
- ^Note 1: As punishment for lying during the audition process, Constance, Dean, and Nelson were fake evicted and sent to the Holding Room. Believed to have been evicted, they could not be nominated by their housemates. On Day 9, they were informed that all three of them would be facing Australia's vote in a Special Eviction. Unbeknownst to everyone, this was also a Double Eviction.
- ^Note 2: Dean was nominated alongside nominees Angela, Geneva and Tim as a result of his previous rule break (see note 1).
- ^Note 3: As new housemates, Rachael and Vesna were exempt from nominations and could not nominate or be nominated.
- ^Note 4: As new housemates, Heath, Melanie and Rita were exempt from nominations and could not nominate or be nominated.
- ^Note 5: On Day 59, the Intruder Eviction was held - first, the housemates had to decide by consensus which of the three intruders they wanted to keep in the house. They saved Rita. Heath and Melanie then faced Australia's vote to determine the Intruder to be evicted over a 20 minute vote. Heath was evicted.
- ^Note 6: Week 10's nominations were fake, and it was revealed after voting that all housemates were nominated. In place of the Three-Point Twist, the Friday Night Live winner, Greg, was given a 50-50 chance to earn immunity by random choice for himself & David. The Logan twins were given two boxes, containing "Not Nominated" and "Nominated" cards, and told to select one box. They selected the "Nominated" box, leaving their nomination intact. While the Logans selected the box after Nominations, Greg (as the sole Logan remaining after the Twin-Eviction) only learned the outcome during the Sunday Eviction.
- ^Note 7: On Day 70, the housemates voted to evict one of the Logan twins in a special Twin Eviction. In the event of a tied vote, Australia would vote to evict a twin in a 5-minute vote. The surviving twin would represent both Logans, and the pair would share the prize money if they won. David was evicted.
- ^Note 8: All housemates faced Australia's vote in the final week; the housemate with the fewest votes to evict on the final night was declared the winner. A special eviction occurred on Day 99, in which Vesna was evicted after receiving the most votes to evict. Additionally, during the Final Weeks, the Friday Night Live was held with the Housemates competing as a team to win back lost prize money (the first against a team of Big Brother “All-Stars” and the second in which the housemates contested the games together); these games had no impact on the Nominations or Evictions.

== Suitcase nominations ==
On Day 0, each housemate was called to the diary room and asked to pick another housemate to not receive their suitcase for the duration of their time in the house. Constance had the majority and lost her suitcase. The voting went as follows:

Housemate	Voted for	Total votes
Angela	Gianna	0
Gianna	Nelson	2
Nelson	Dean	1
Dean	Kate	1
Christie	Kate	1
Tim	Michael	0
Glenn	Hotdogs	0
Constance	Gianna	4
Michelle	Constance	0
Kate	Constance	2
Logan	Constance	0
Michael	Constance	2
Hotdogs	Michael	1
Geneva	Christie	0

== Weekly summary and highlights ==
Week 1	Major events	Big Brother 2005 launched with a live opening night that was broadcast around Australia. Fourteen official housemates entered the House.; Logan David entered with the other Housemates, while Logan Greg entered in the Isolation Room.; On Day 2, the Logans swapped places for the first time, during a special show named Live Surprise.; Michelle's birthday was on Day 4.
Week 1	Group task	Getting to know each other: The housemates were asked questions about each other. They passed the task.
Week 1	Friday Night Live	Glenn won the first Friday Night Live and took Logan with him to the Rewards Room. The theme for the night was Roman. Logan came runner up
Week 1	Nominations	Suitcases: One by one, each housemate went to the Diary Room and nominated the person that he or she felt least deserved their suitcase. The housemates chose Constance, and therefore she returned her suitcase and it was not given to her for the rest of her stay in the Big Brother House.
Week 1	Evictions	On Day 8, Big Brother told the housemates that they were constantly told during the pre-production process, that should their relationship status change during the auditions process, that they should tell Big Brother immediately. Because Constance, Dean and Nelson did not do this, and lied to get into the House, they were all "evicted" to the Rewards Room.
Week 2	Major events	The three housemates previously sent to the Rewards Room were allowed back into the House.; Kate's birthday was on Day 10.; On Day 12, as part of Friday Night Live, Big Brother revealed the secret behind the checkered carpet on the wall, which was a bowling alley.
Week 2	Group task	On Day 11, the housemates were told of their new task: to build the perfect housemate. They each had to have a part of their body moulded and then they were all put together to make a person. The housemates bet 100% of their budget on their task. They passed the task on Day 12.
Week 2	Friday Night Live	Day 12 was Friday Night Live. Gianna won Friday Night Live, and took Christie to the Rewards Room. The theme for the night was 50's. Tim was the runner-up.
Week 2	Nominations	Nominations took place on Day 9. The housemates in the eviction line-up were Geneva, Michelle and Tim. After Glenn's Three Point Twist, the eviction line-up changed to Geneva, Tim and Angela.
Week 2	Evictions	Constance and Nelson were disqualified by public vote on Day 10 in a full-scale eviction. They were each told during their eviction interview that they would not receive any prizes.; Angela was evicted on Day 15.
Week 3	Major events	On Day 15, Geneva left a shopping bag in the supermarket.; On Day 18, the housemates showed their disgust at Dean's reluctance to clean the House; he was appointed janitor by Gianna.; Big Brother banned all housemates from using the spa until Dean cleaned the House. Big Brother then decided to limit the amount of alcohol to the housemates after drunken incidents involving Christie.; Christie got very drunk on Day 20 and was locked in the Airlock by Big Brother. Upon being locked in the Airlock, Christie referred to Big Brother by a series of derogatory terms and was awarded a strike for this action.; Geneva made out with Glenn in the lounge room, the pool and the sauna.
Week 3	Group task	A new task was announced on Day 17. A packing machine was set up in the garden, with conveyor belts. Housemates had to be on guard 24/7 because goods would be passed through the machine at any time. It was the housemates' job to pack all items into crates. On a majority vote, the housemates wagered 75% of their budget. They failed and had only $48 to spend.
Week 3	Friday Night Live	Day 20 was Friday Night Live. Michelle won Friday Night Live, and took Kate to the Rewards Room. The theme for the night was wacky athletics. Hotdogs was the runner-up.
Week 3	Nominations	Geneva, Gianna and Hotdogs were nominated. Gianna used her Three Point Twist on herself, changing the eviction line-up to Gianna, Geneva, Hotdogs and Michael.
Week 3	Evictions	Gianna was evicted on Day 22.
Week 4	Major events	Big Brother informed the housemates that because of the fines they had incurred during the previous week, their $48 shopping budget had been reduced by $50, $5 for each fine incurred. Because of this, the housemates owed Big Brother $2, and could only take staples from the shop. Dean was able to retrieve the bag left there the week before.; Replacement Housemates Rachael and Vesna entered the House on Day 25 during Housemates: Incoming!.
Week 4	Group task	On Day 23, the housemates were given a Tango task. They all had to learn how to tango, and could use a dance mat provided by Big Brother. They also had to learn using dummies. They wagered their full budget on the task.; Kate was given an Insider mission on Day 24. She was told that she had to sabotage the Tango task by removing at least three heads from three dummies, and hide them without being found out. She was given five days to complete her mission, and was told that she might be tailed. Tim was later given the task of discovering that Kate was trying to sabotage the task.; On Day 25, Kate managed to remove and hide some heads. The housemates suspected Tim of doing it.; On Day 28, it was announced that the housemates had failed their Tango task, but because Kate accomplished hers, and Tim failed his, the group passed the task.
Week 4	Friday Night Live	Rachael won Day 27's Friday Night Live, and took Tim to the Rewards Room. The theme was Italy.
Week 4	Nominations	The housemates up for eviction were Dean, Michael, Christie and Glenn. Michelle used her Three Point Twist on Glenn, and he escaped nomination.
Week 4	Evictions	Michael was evicted on Day 29.
Week 5	Major events	Hotdogs received a video message.
Week 5	Group task	On Day 31, the housemates were given a Housekeeping task. Housemates had to pair up as a chef and a waiter. The housemates wagered their full shopping budget again.; Because housemates did not always wash their hands during the task, and one housemate picked their nose while making spaghetti, Big Brother announced on Day 32 that the housemates failed their task.
Week 5	Friday Night Live	Glenn won Friday Night Live for the second time. He took Michelle to the rewards room. Christie was the runner-up. The theme was a day at the fair.
Week 5	Nominations	Christie, Dean, Hotdogs and Michelle were originally up for eviction. Rachael used her Three Point Twist on Christie, changing the eviction line-up to Dean, Hotdogs and Michelle.
Week 5	Evictions	Michelle was evicted on Day 36.
Week 6	Major events	Day 38's dinner was confiscated after Dean broke the rules.; The housemates found out that they passed their task on Day 40. Big Brother threw a party in celebration of their passing the task, that went into Day 41. There was a lot of alcohol, and Hotdogs got considerably drunk. He refused to clean up, and upset Geneva, Vesna and Glenn. On Day 42, he apologised for his behaviour. He received a strike from Big Brother on Day 43.
Week 6	Group task	The housemates were given a Calendar Task on Day 37. When the housemates heard a camera shutter, they had to strike a pose and hold it, as though for a calendar. They wagered their full shopping budget.
Week 6	Friday Night Live	Dean won Friday Night Live. The theme was water sports. Racheal was the runner-up. He took Hotdogs to the rewards room.
Week 6	Nominations	Christie, Dean, Geneva and Rachael were up for eviction. Glenn used his Three Point Twist on Dean, changing the eviction line-up to Christie, Geneva and Rachael.
Week 6	Evictions	Rachael was evicted on Day 43.
Week 7	Major events	The bedroom was split into two for the Masters and Servants task.; The Exit room (the rewards room but with small changes) is first introduced on eviction night on Day 50. The evictee would be evicted from the exit room and not the lounge room.
Week 7	Group task	On Day 44, Big Brother introduced the Masters and Slaves task, where half of the housemates were allocated slaves to one other housemate each. The masters were not allowed to say please, thank you or sorry to any of the slaves. They had hot water available to them whenever they wanted, but slaves had to shower outside and do laundry.; The Masters were given new slaves on Day 46. Dave became Greg's slave.; On Day 47, the Masters became slaves, and the new Masters got to choose whomever they wanted as their slave.
Week 7	Friday Night Live	Kate won Friday Night Live. Tim was the runner-up. The theme was Boot camp. Kate took Geneva with her to the rewards room.
Week 7	Nominations	The housemates up for eviction were Geneva, Hotdogs and Vesna. Dean used his Three Point Twist on Geneva, and added himself to the line-up.
Week 7	Evictions	Geneva was evicted on Day 50. The girls expressed disappointment in the fact that Dean did not get evicted.
Week 8	Major events	New Intruders Heath, Melanie and Rita, entered the House on Day 53.
Week 8	Group task	On Day 51, Big Brother set a Schoolyard Task, where the housemates had to act as though they were back at school and form a band. They were not allowed to swear from breakfast time up to the end of school. Big Brother provided the housemates with school uniforms. The housemates wagered their whole budget on the task.
Week 8	Friday Night Live	The Logans won the Friday night games. Heath was the runner-up. The theme was Asian. The Logans chose Hotdogs to go with them to the rewards room.
Week 8	Nominations	Housemates up for eviction were Christie, Dean, Kate. Kate used her Three Point Twist on Christie, changing the eviction line-up to Dean, Glenn, Hotdogs, Kate, Vesna.
Week 8	Evictions	Glenn was evicted on Day 57.
Week 9	Major events	Heath was given a strike on Day 57 for his abusive behaviour on Day 56.
Week 9	Group task	
Week 9	Friday Night Live	The Logans won Friday Night Live on Day 62, and they took Dean to the Rewards Room. The theme was life in space. Christie was the runner-up.
Week 9	Nominations	
Week 9	Evictions	Heath was evicted on Day 59 in Intruder Eviction.; Hotdogs was evicted on Day 64.
Week 10	Major events	
Week 10	Group task	The housemates were given a tap-dancing task on Day 66. They had to learn how to tap dance.; On Day 70, the housemates had to give a final performance that decided whether or not they passed their test. Big Brother later announced that he was impressed by the performance, therefore the housemates passed their task.
Week 10	Friday Night Live	Logan won Day 69's Friday Night Live, and took the Christie to the Rewards Room. Christie was the runner-up. The theme was winter wonderland. This week was notable for the boys offering to give up their position to Christie and allowing her to take someone else. She declined and admitted that she would've chosen the boys anyway
Week 10	Nominations	On Day 65, it was announced that Kate, Logan and Rita were up for eviction. The Logans used their Three Point Twist on themselves, changing the final line-up to Dean, Kate, Rita and Tim.
Week 10	Evictions	Dean was evicted on Day 71.
Week 11	Major events	
Week 11	Group task	Big Brother told the housemates on Day 72 that they had to form the "Big Brother Brigade" as part of their Survival task. The housemates decided to wager 100% of their budget.; Big Brother told the housemates on Day 75 that they would have passed their task if they did not swear so much, and if they did not shout instructions to the other housemates when they were to do something without help.
Week 11	Friday Night Live	Tim won Day 76's Friday Night Live, and he invited Vesna to the Rewards Room. Melanie was the runner-up. The theme was DIY.; As part of his prize, Tim won a family message. He gave it to Kate.
Week 11	Nominations	All housemates were up for eviction this week, but Big Brother gave the Logans the opportunity to save themselves, as the winners of Friday Night Live. They were given two boxes, and were told to pick one. They picked the box that means they are nominated, but they would not find this out until Sunday.
Week 11	Evictions	David was evicted in a Surprise Twin Eviction on Day 74.; Christie and Rita were evicted in a double eviction on Day 78.
Week 12	Major events	Vesna was told on Day 84 that she had to host a dinner, but keep her mission a secret. If she succeeded, Big Brother would provide her with a sweets pack.
Week 12	Group tasks	As part of the housemates' new task, announced to them on Day 79, they had to make a movie. They wagered their whole budget on it.; On Day 83, the housemates were invited to watch their movie. When the movie had finished, they were told they had passed their task.
Week 12	Friday Night Live	Tim won the Friday night games. Greg was the runner-up. Tim took Greg to the rewards room. The theme was Australian.
Week 12	Nominations	The housemates up for eviction were Greg, Melanie and Vesna. After Tim used his Three Point Twist on Greg, housemates nominated for eviction were Kate, Melanie and Vesna.
Week 12	Evictions	Kate was evicted on Day 85.
Week 13	Major events	On Day 88, Big Brother announced a bowling tournament, as the housemates were bowling at the time. Tim and Melanie won, and their prize was chocolate. They were not allowed to share it with any other housemates.
Week 13	Group tasks	Big Brother set a task on Day 87. Housemates had to be chained together at the wrist.; Melanie and Tim's chain broke on Day 88, and Tim wanted to find out if they had failed the task because of it. Big Brother said he would tell the housemates later.; On Day 89, Vesna deliberately broke her chain, and tried to convince the other housemates to give up on the task. Big Brother later switched the chained pairs and punished them for being disobedient.; The housemates were given a task to build a tower, and the team with the highest would win a takeaway meal. The housemates had to work with whomever they were chained to, as teams.; Big Brother announced to the housemates on Day 90 that they had failed their chain task.
Week 13	Friday Night Live	Day 90's Friday Night Live was an All-Stars game, and Bree, Ryan (Fitzy), Paul and Wesley, all from Big Brother 2004; Joanne (Jo) from Big Brother 2003; and Jessica (Jess) from Big Brother 2002, all competed in the games. In this game, the housemates were given the opportunity to win back some of the prize money they lost in fines. At the end of the games, they received a $20,000 cheque.
Week 13	Nominations	The housemates nominated for the last time on Day 86. Logan Greg, Vesna and Tim were up for eviction. Tim used his Three Point Twist on himself and changed the eviction line-up to Logan Greg, Vesna and Melanie.
Week 13	Evictions	Melanie was evicted on Day 92.
Week 14	Major events	Nadia Almada, winner of Big Brother 5 UK, entered the House on Day 93 as a house-guest. She was served dinner by the housemates, but they were soon discussing the fact that Nadia was transgender.; Nadia left the House on Day 95, after she was given framed photos of her time in the House. She was given the opportunity to record a goodbye message, similar to what housemates up for eviction do every week. She started the message by saying she hated all the housemates and that they were the worst people she had ever met, then left the screen. After a short while, she returned on screen and said that was a practical joke, and that she loved everybody really.; The housemates finally received their video messages from their families and friends on Day 96.
Week 14	Friday Night Live	Day 97’s Friday Night Live was The Prize Fight. Across four games, the housemates were given the opportunity to win back all of the prize money they had lost in fines. At the end of the games, they had collectively earned $236,000 back into the prize pool.
Week 14	Evictions	Vesna was evicted on Day 99.; Tim and Greg both left the House on Day 100.; Greg Mathew was announced winner of Big Brother 2005, and $836,000 for himself and his twin brother David.

== Special episodes ==
A number of special episodes aired during the original run of the season. These included:

=== Live Surprise ===
"Live Surprise" was a live show broadcast on Day 2. During this show, the Logan twins swapped places with each other for the first time. They were given two minutes in the Diary Room to exchange as much information as possible, and Greg then had to go to the Isolation Room while David went into the Big Brother House. The Daily Show was broadcast as a part of Live Surprise. Hosted by Gretel Killeen.

=== Lies Exposed ===
"Lies Exposed" was a show broadcast on Day 8. After Glenn's discovery that Logan was in fact two twins, this was revealed to all of the housemates. Before this, Constance, Dean and Nelson were all evicted to the Punishment Room; and were told their fate by Big Brother. Hosted by Gretel Killeen.

=== Viewers Verdict ===
"Viewers Verdict" was a live show broadcast on Day 10. This special was aired because Constance, Dean and Nelson, had all lied about their relationship status. A public vote was held, that was started on Day 9 and was closed during the show, minutes before two of these housemates who had broken the rules were evicted. Constance and Nelson were evicted in this show, and were reunited with their partners. They both had separate eviction interviews with Gretel, and were both told that, because they had deceived Big Brother, they would receive no prizes. Dean was safe, but Big Brother still punished him by banning him from nominations and by putting him up for the public vote next week.

=== Housemates: Incoming! ===
"Housemates: Incoming!" was a live show broadcast during Day 25, where replacement housemates Rachael and Vesna were introduced to the public and put in the House.

=== Intruders Arrive ===
"Intruders Arrive" was a live show broadcast on Day 53, where Intruders Heath, Rita and Melanie entered the Big Brother House.

=== Intruder Eviction ===
"Intruder Eviction" was a live show broadcast on Day 59. The housemates were given 1 minute and 30 seconds to discuss amongst themselves which of the new Intruders, Heath, Melanie and Rita, they wanted to keep. They decided to keep Rita, so Heath and Melanie were put up for eviction. As the public SMS vote started and finished during the show, lasting only twenty minutes, viewers in Western Australia, South Australia and the Northern Territory were not able to vote as television shows in Australia are broadcast with a delay depending on the state to compensate for differences in Australian time zones. Heath received the most votes and was evicted. It was hosted by Gretel Killeen.

=== Surprise Twin Eviction ===
"Surprise Twin Eviction" was a live Eviction aired on Day 74. With David and Greg both living in the House as a single housemate, the twins were put up for eviction as two separate people. David was evicted. Hosted by Gretel Killeen.

=== Friday Night Live – All-Stars ===
A special All Stars edition of Friday Night Live took place on Day 90. Greg, Melanie, Tim and Vesna all competed against a team of ex-housemates to try to win a A$20,000 addition to the prize fund. The team they were competing against was Paul and Wesley from Big Brother 2004, Joanne from Big Brother 2003, and Jess from Big Brother 2002; and if they won Friday Night Live, they would win the $20,000 in the form of $5,000 each. Bree Amer and Ryan Fitzgerald, Friday Night Live co-presenters and former Big Brother 2004 housemates, participated in one of the games, each as an additional member of one of the teams. The All Stars team won the Friday Night Live.

=== The Final Countdown ===
"The Final Countdown" was aired on Day 93. In this show, Nadia Almada, winner of Big Brother 5 UK, entered the Big Brother House as a house-guest. Hosted by Gretel Killeen.

=== The Prize Fight ===
"The Prize Fight" was a special Friday Night Live that aired on Day 97. The remaining housemates were given the opportunity to win the $400,000 the prize money they had lost in fines. They earned $236,000.

=== Finale ===
The season finale aired on Day 100 in which Logan Greg & Logan David was announced the winners and Tim the runner-up.

Logan councillor and future Queensland MP Aidan McLindon jumped on the set as Gretel Killeen prepared to announce the winner, and was later fined $250. He was elected as the member for Beaudesert in 2009.

== Controversies ==
=== Nudity and sexual content ===
In June 2005, the frolics involving nudity of the housemates urged politicians to request a review of how much nudity can be shown on television, as this season's 'Uncut' show featured frequent nudity (i.e. housemates showering in the nude) and sexual activities in the hot tub. The Australian Communications and Media Authority decided that 'Uncut' breached the MA classification of Commercial Industry Code of Practice two times, once was for full frontal male nudity and once for excessively coarse language.

The 'Uncut' episodes on 30 May, 6 June and 13 June, respectively, featured female housemates simulating masturbation with a vibrator, the females housemates in the spa using a shower nozzle to simulate masturbation, and housemates Glenn Dallinger and Michelle Carew-Gibson appearing to have sexual activity in a spa in the rewards room. Also on the 13 June episode, several male housemates ad libbed a sexual explicit song about a man with a sexual fetish who liked to "leave a skid mark on the chest" of females. Because of such content, the show was called "Big Brothel" by some critics.

MP Trish Draper remarked that housemates taking nude photos of each other in one 'Uncut' episode was like having "pornography and full frontal nudity on television at a time when children are watching," before adding that the housemates "have an aspiration to be porn stars." Housemate Michelle Carew-Gibson stated that viewers can turn off their television if they did not like what was shown, before remarking that the housemates are sexually active people and such interactions are "going to happen". Intruder Heath Tournier remarked that potential housemates for this season had to parade nude and perform lapdances during the auditions so the producers "know what they're like".

=== Alleged non-consensual sexual activities ===
On 'Uncut', aired on May 30, Michael, the oldest housemate, requested female housemate Gianna to come to him so he could give her a massage. While Gianna sat with her back to Michael, he took out his penis from his pants and stroked it in her hair, as she appeared to be oblivious to the act. It was alleged that he touched her sexually, seemingly without her consent, in order to amuse the housemates in the vicinity. Viewers had their own interpretations from the incident. Host Gretel Killeen expressed her disapproval of Michael's actions. In an interview with the two, Michael stated that it was a "practical joke", and Gianna agreed.

In the same 'Uncut' episode, male housemate Tim was hogtied and ditched in the diary room, after he was tackled and had his testicles hit with a leather strap. Big Brother responded to discuss with Tim whether or not he was comfortable with this treatment since Big Brother "does not condone bullying", though Tim replied that he was not bullied.

In July 2006, in light of the alleged sexual assault of female housemate Camilla during the sixth season, intruder Rita Lazzarotto claimed that she was "turkey-slapped" by fellow intruder Heath Tournier. Although the event was not mentioned publicly, Big Brother summoned the two to the diary room to discuss the incident and left the decision of whether Tournier should be ejected from the house up to her. Lazzarotto stated that she was not offended by it.

=== Investigations ===
Trish Draper and other government backbenchers demanded the Australia's communications minister Helen Coonan to brief MPs and senators on the rules for broadcasting adult material on free-to-air television in Australia. The aforementioned 'Uncut' episodes aired on 30 May, 6 June and 13 June 2005 caused a dispute between the Australian Communications and Media Authority (ACMA) and Network Ten due to having "a significant degree of intensity" for the MA15+ rating and thereby breaching the code. The Australian Broadcasting Authority (ABA) investigated the three 'Uncut' episodes in response to substantial media and public complaints about the show's explicit content.

Regarding the incident with Michael and Gianna, ACMA noted that it caused a negative reaction. Network Ten issued an apology for any offence caused by the behaviour of some of the male housemates and their attitude towards women. Network Ten did argue that the scene was not gratuitous, as it was exhibiting a side of Michael's personality. Network Ten also stated that the incident did not "debase" Gianna for the enjoyment of other housemates, although the Network did not condone Michael's behaviour.

In response to the backlash and dispute regarding the sexual content of the 'Uncut' episodes, Network Ten contended that 'Uncut' offered viewers a naturalistic depiction of life in the Big Brother house and such depictions of sensuality were justified by context. Moreover, a spokeswoman for Network Ten stated that 'Uncut' still complied with the Australian Commercial Television Code of Practice.
