= Miriam Rivera =

Mexican actress (1981–2019)

- Born: 20 January 1981; Mexico
- Died: 5 February 2019 (aged 38); Hermosillo, Sonora, Mexico
- Other names: Miriam; Miriam Xtravaganza
- Occupations: Model; actress; reality television personality
- Height: 5 ft 7 in (1.70 m)
- Spouse: Daniel Cuervo

Miriam Rivera (20 January 1981 – 5 February 2019), known by the mononym Miriam, was a Mexican model and television personality, who became known for starring on the British reality television show There's Something About Miriam and guesting on Big Brother Australia 2004. She became recognized as the first openly transgender reality television star.

Rivera was found dead in February 2019 at her apartment in Sonora, Mexico. She was deemed to have died by suicide, but her husband believed she had been murdered.

In 2021, Novel and Wondery published an investigative podcast series into Rivera's life and her appearance on the show There's Something About Miriam titled Harsh Reality. It was number one in the Podcast in the USA and Canada in December 2021, won the APA Gold award and the British Podcast awards in 2022.

In June 2022, a similar three-part documentary series, called Miriam: Death of a Reality Star, was commissioned by Channel 4 from Expectation Entertainment.

== Life and career ==
Rivera was born in 1981 in Mexico. She displayed signs of gender dysphoria since the age of four. She said that while her three brothers liked baseball, she preferred Barbie dolls. Rivera said strangers assumed she was a girl:

They used to come to my mother and say, "Oh you have a beautiful daughter", and my mother used to say "That's my son", and I used to get angry.

Rivera said she soon started taking hormones. She told reporters she came out after being suspended from school at age 12.

Remy Blumenfeld first saw Rivera performing in Speed Angels - a transgender girl band- after which he planned to cast her in a TV show that was later released as There's Something About Miriam. She was filmed in Ibiza for There's Something About Miriam in 2003, but the show's airdate was delayed until out-of-court settlement of litigation by contestants in 2004. It originally aired in the United Kingdom on Sky1 in February 2004. Hosted by Tim Vincent, it featured six men wooing Rivera without revealing that she was transgender until the final episode. Rivera enjoyed the attention she received following the show.

After the high ratings for the show, she was cast as a guest on Big Brother Australia 2004, also produced by Endemol. A documentary about her life was commissioned but not aired.

She stated she never planned to have sex reassignment surgery, citing concerns about complications or loss of sensation. She said, "My mother always says to me, 'Why would you want to be half-and-half? Why don't you want to be a complete woman?' But I just love myself and I'm really enjoying my life."

Rivera told reporters in 2007 that she fell out of a fourth-story window while trying to escape an intruder. In 2008, she was a special guest on Ewa Drzyzga's TVN show Rozmowy w toku in Poland. Rivera had also been active in Manhattan's ball culture, and was part of the House of Xtravaganza.

== Personal life and death ==
Rivera was married to Daniel Cuervo, with whom she lived in New York City. She was found dead on 5 February 2019, in her apartment in Mexico. Her death was confirmed by Cuervo in a Facebook post and received news coverage six months later. Her death was classified as suicide by hanging by the police, but Cuervo believes she was murdered. Cuervo received a death threat from someone who told Cuervo to "never come back to Mexico" and to prepare her funeral.

== Filmography ==
- There's Something About Miriam (2003, Brighter Pictures)
- Big Brother Australia 2004 (2004, Endemol)
- TV Burp (2004)
- Rove Live (2004)
- Good Morning Australia (2004)

== See also ==
- LGBTQ culture in New York City
- List of LGBTQ people from New York City
- NYC Pride March
