= Grant Goldman =

Australian broadcaster (1950–2020)

- Born: 3 February 1950; Brisbane, Queensland, Australia
- Died: 17 January 2020 (aged 69); Sydney, New South Wales, Australia
- Occupations: Radio and television presenter
- Years active: 1964–2019
- Children: Mike Goldman

Grant Goldman (3 February 1950 – 17 January 2020) was an Australian radio and television presenter. He worked as both a voice-over and live presenter.

Goldman was the father of Mike Goldman who is also a TV and radio personality and voice-over artist.

== Biography ==
Goldman was educated in Tamworth, New South Wales and began his radio career at the age of 14, and worked for numerous stations, including 2TM, 2GB, 2UE, 2WS, and 2Day FM. He was the breakfast announcer at 2SM and also broadcast to the Super Radio Network.

As a television presenter, Goldman hosted the live musical show Stairway to the Stars on the Seven Network, Juke Box Jury for the Seven Network in Brisbane, It's A Small World for Network Ten in Brisbane, the Lottery Draw on the Nine Network in Sydney and others.

Goldman was a feature presenter at the Big Day Out rock concert in 1970 and numerous other high-profile pop and rock concerts, and the ground announcer for all events held at Stadium Australia, and various sports events including the 2000 Summer Olympics. He also did voice-over work for a number of commercial and tourism-related purposes. Goldman also served as an announcer for the Manly Warringah Sea Eagles rugby league team and the Sydney Kings basketball team.

Goldman was also well known for his voiceover work for CityRail in Sydney, which was used for most platform announcements across the railway network from 1988 to 2000.

Goldman lived on the Northern Beaches in Sydney. He died of cancer at his home on 17 January 2020, 17 days short of his 70th birthday.
