= There's Something About Miriam =

2004 reality television series

- Genre: Reality television
- Presented by: Tim Vincent
- Starring: Miriam Rivera
- Country of origin: United Kingdom
- Original language: English
- No. of series: 1
- No. of episodes: 6

Production
- Executive producers: Remy Blumenfeld; Gavin Hay
- Production location: Ibiza, Spain
- Running time: 1 hour (60 min)
- Production company: Brighter Pictures

Original release
- Network: Sky1
- Release: 22 February – 24 March 2004

There's Something About Miriam is a British reality television series broadcast by Sky1. The six-episode series premiered on 22 February 2004 and concluded on 24 March 2004. Set in Ibiza, Spain, the series depicted six men in competition for a £10,000 reward over who could make the best impression on 21-year-old Mexican model Miriam Rivera. The men were required to compete in various physical challenges in addition to going on individual and group dates with Rivera. In the final episode, Rivera selected the one contestant who left the best impression on her; upon selection, Rivera revealed to the contestants that she was a transgender woman who had not yet undergone gender-affirming surgery. The series was hosted by Welsh television presenter Tim Vincent.

The series aired on Fox Reality Channel in 2007.

== Production and filming ==
Remy Blumenfeld first saw Rivera participating in a girl band, after which he planned to cast her in a TV show. The show was produced by the Brighter Pictures subsidiary of Endemol and was originally titled Find Me a Man. Recruitment ads for contestants promised "the adventure of a lifetime" with a £10,000 prize for men aged 20 to 35 who "want it all" and are "fit and up for everything." The contestants on the show were:

- Mark Dimino, 24, optician
- Toby Green, 23, student
- Aron Lane, 22, chef
- Tom Rooke, 23, lifeguard and ex-ski instructor
- Scott Gibson, 22, martial arts expert
- Dominic Conway, 28, Royal Marine

Brighter Pictures managing director Gavin Hay said "they had made a point of never referring to Miriam as a woman when getting the men to take part."

Rivera said "Several of them wondered about me in the first few days. But as the series unfolded, I really thought that we got to like and know each other as friends and had a lot of fun." In response to allegations that she revealed her big secret by lifting up her skirt she was quoted as saying "I would never lift my skirt up on national TV. My mother brought me up very well." On the version that aired, Rivera chose Rooke as the winner and then said in front of the assembled contestants:

I tried to be honest with all of you, not just some of you. Yes, I am from Mexico, I am a model, and I'm 21. But Tom, I really love spending time with you and kissing you. You see, I love men, and I love being a woman. But... shh, quiet everybody, please, quiet. But you see, Tom... I am not a woman. I was born as a man.

Miriam's childhood friend suspects this quote was scripted.

Rooke initially accepted the prize money and the trip with Rivera on camera. Rooke later rejected the prize prior to airing and joined the other contestants in a lawsuit that sought to prevent the airing of the show.

== Litigation and release ==
Following the completion of the show, it was scheduled to air in November 2003, but a lawsuit by the contestants delayed the airing. They alleged conspiracy to commit sexual assault, defamation, breach of contract, and personal injury in the form of psychological and emotional damage.

After the men settled for an undisclosed amount, the show premiered 22 February, and the sixth and final episode aired 24 March 2004.

The show was aired in Australia by Network Ten in May 2004, in Lithuania by TV3 in December 2004, in Poland by TVN in January 2005, and in Argentina in 2005 on América TV. The show was picked up by Fox Reality for airing in the United States in April 2006, and was aired in October 2007. and other European countries on August 12, 2006

== Reception ==
Responses from critics were generally unfavourable, calling it part of a trend in shows that exploit unwitting contestants. A British reviewer noted "The whole premise of There's Something About Miriam was not a celebration of transgender people's lives. It was designed to elicit horror from the winning contestant discovering that his dream date had a penis." The show was also criticized by transgender groups, who feared a backlash of public opinion. When the show aired in Australia, reviews were critical of both the premise and Rivera:

These guys were duped in more ways than one – while Miriam has a few unexpected bits in her package, she's notably deficient in others. It has become clear Miriam requires a personality implant. It must've been a challenge to find a transsexual pretty enough, mean enough and sufficiently attention-seeking to play this tawdry game, but what these producers found in Miriam is a sultry-looking dill prone to the cheesiest of clichés.

Other British commentators contrasted Rivera with the positive response to Nadia Almada, a Portuguese-born transgender woman who won Big Brother UK a few months later. That show was also produced by Endemol.

However, the show garnered high ratings in the final episode (970,000 viewers—large viewership for Sky One), and Rivera went on to become a guest on Big Brother Australia 2004.

There's Something About Miriam was featured on the 2005 clip show "40 Greatest Pranks" on VH1 and was ranked #11 on the 20 to One episode "Hoaxes, Cheats and Liars".

When the show aired in the United States on the 2007 Transgender Day of Remembrance, trans author Julia Serano noted "Programs like There's Something About Miriam not only reinforce the stereotype that trans people's birth sex is 'real' and our identified/lived sex is 'fake,' but they perpetuate the myth of deception and thus enable violence against us."

Video artist Phil Collins featured contestant Mark Dimino in an installation on "people who believe their lives have been ruined by appearing on reality TV."

== In popular culture ==
In 2021 Wondery published an investigative podcast series, Harsh Reality: The Story of Miriam Rivera, into Rivera's life and her appearance on the show. In June 2022, a similar three-part documentary series, called Miriam: Death of a Reality Star, was commissioned by Expectation Entertainment for Channel 4.

== See also ==
- The Bachelorette (2003)
- Transamerican Love Story (2008)
