= Joker Poker =

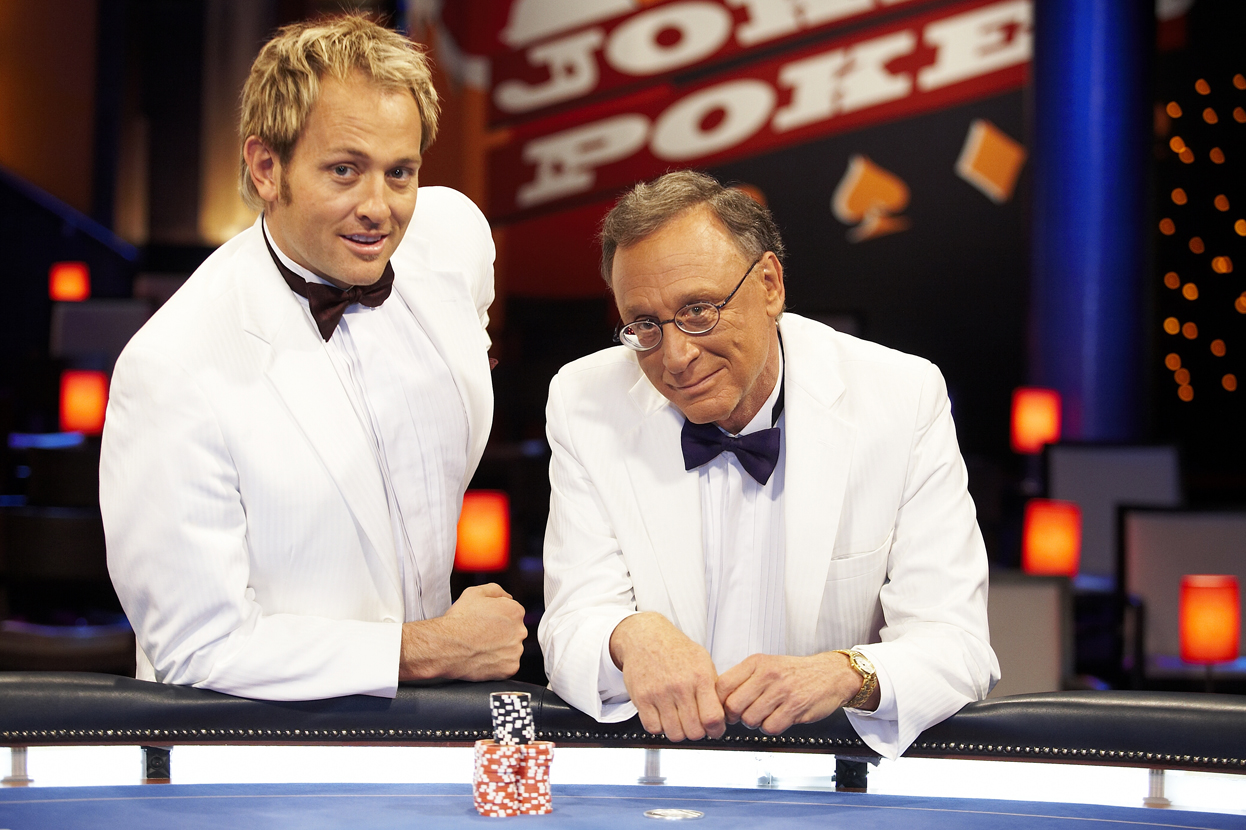
- Genre: Poker
- Presented by: Lee Nelson; Adam Spencer; Mike Goldman
- Country of origin: Australia
- Original language: English
- No. of seasons: 2

Production
- Production company: Freehand Productions

Original release
- Network: Network Ten
- Release: September 24, 2005 – 2006

Joker Poker was a late night Australian poker program on Network Ten which aired in 2005 and 2006. The 2005 edition was hosted by Adam Spencer, with the second and final edition hosted by Mike Goldman. Both were co-hosted by New Zealand poker pro Lee Nelson and Australian model Laura Weston acted as hostess. The show was produced by Australian Production Company Freehand Productions.

The show featured Australian comedians playing no-limit Texas hold'em poker. Four comedians compete in each episode on behalf of their chosen charity. It was recorded in the high rollers' room of Sydney's Star City Casino for the first season and in a studio at Fox Studios in Sydney for the second. The weekly winner donates $5,000 to charity, while the overall winner donates $25,000.

A New Zealand version also aired in 2007.

== Season one ==
Joker Poker was the first locally produced poker program to go to air in Australia. Hosted by Adam Spencer and Lee Nelson, it featured 40 local comedians during the course of the inaugural season. It aired on Saturday nights at 10:30pm.

The first season was won by comedian Andy Lee. The final players were Andy Lee, Doctor Turf, Simon Kennedy and Jackie Loeb.

=== Charities ===
Star City Casino provided the $100,000 prize pool that was distributed by the winners of each round and the two final tables to the following charities:

- The Westmead Hospital
- The Heart Foundation
- Prince of Wales Foundation
- Canteen
- The Australian Red Cross
- Barnardos Australia
- The Mirrabel Foundation
- The Fred Hollows Foundation
- The Aids Trust of Australia
- Amnesty International

== Season two ==
Joker Poker returned in 2006, with Lee Nelson being joined by Mike Goldman in place of Spencer. The second and final season consisted of 12 late night Joker Poker shows (airing on Wednesday nights at 11:15pm), Sporting Joker Poker and Lee Nelson Invitational specials, and four Celebrity Joker Poker specials (airing Tuesday nights at 9.30pm).

=== Contestants ===
Contestants on Joker Poker Season 2 by episode
Episode	Contestants
1	Jean Kittson, Steve Bedwell, Rusty Berther, Greg Fleet
2	Anh Do, George Kapiniaris, Lisa Ricketts, Josh Lawson
3	Ben Hewett, Akmal Saleh, Fitzy, Mick Meredith
4	Subby Valentine, Tommy Dean, Simon Kennedy, Bev Killick
5	Brendon Jones, Anthony Mir, Pommy Johnson, Rash Ryder
6	Chris Wainhouse, Russell Fletcher, Cindy Pan, Kip Wightman
7	Tahir Bilgiç, Jason Gann, Bruno Lucia, Adam Saunders
8	Tim Smith, Cal Wilson, Damian Callinan, Ewan Campbell
9	Julian Schiller, Tony Moclair, Tanya Bulmer, Marty Fields
10	Gabby Millgate, Chris Franklin, Jackie Loeb, Mario Doria
Final Table 1	Rusty Berther, Josh Lawson, Akmal Saleh, Subby Valentine, Pommy Johnson
Final Table 2	Chris Wainhouse, Julian Schiller, Damian Callinan, Tahir Bilgic, Mario Doria

Contestants on Celebrity Joker Poker and related specials
Special title	Contestants
Celebrity Joker Poker 1	Julia Zemiro, Nick Giannopoulos, Mikey Robins, Tim Ferguson
Celebrity Joker Poker 2	Brigitte Duclos, Daniel McPherson, John Jarratt, Bree Amer
Celebrity Joker Poker 3	Hamish Blake, Andy Lee, Andrew G, Arj Barker
Celebrity Joker Poker 4	Akmal Saleh, Kimberley Davies, Ajay Rochester, Tim Ferguson
Sporting Special	Shane Heal, Mat Rogers, Robert DiPierdomenico, Ryan Phelan, Steven Bradbury
Lee Nelson Invitational	Lisa Ricketts, Fitzy, George Kapiniaris, Cal Wilson, Erin McNaught

=== Charities ===
Wild Turkey provided the $140,000 prize pool that was distributed by the winners of each round and the two final tables to the following charities:

- Clown Doctors
- Amnesty International
- Matthew Talbot
- Variety Club
- Surf Life Saving Association
- Motor Neurone Disease
- Royal Children's Hospital in Melbourne – specifically the genetics department
- Royal Children's Hospital Melbourne
- Trisha & The Reach Broadridge Fund
- Kids Help Line
- Bonnie Babes Foundation
- Challenge Kids with Cancer

== New Zealand version ==
The New Zealand version of the show was hosted by Brooke Howard-Smith and co-hosted by Lee Nelson. The two editions of the New Zealand version of Joker Poker (consisting of 12 episodes) began screening on TV3 Sunday nights at 10:30pm from 10 February 2007. The series was repeated on C4 with great results, airing on the following Wednesday nights at 8:30pm beginning 13 February 2007.

Sponsors for the New Zealand were Pokerstars.net, Sky City Casino and Wild Turkey.

=== Contestants ===
==== Season one ====
- Episode 1: Jamie Linehan, Angus MacDonald, Ali Williams, Ben Boyce
- Episode 2: Craig Parker, Mark Ferguson, Che Fu, Pam Corkery
- Episode 3: Tim Shadbolt, Raybon Kan, Aja Rock, Steve Devine
- Episode 4: Peter Urlich, Hayley Holt, Elizabeth Gray, Monty Betham
- Episode 5: John Afoa, Daniel Braid, George Pisi, Jeremy Corbett

==== Season two ====
- Episode 1: Amber Peebles, Dave Gibson, Nick Dwyer, Jamie Carroll
- Episode 2: Dai Henwood, Teuila Blakely, Jessie Gurunathan, Phil Bostwick
- Episode 3: Mark Williams, Dallas Tamaira, Mu (Chris Faiumu), Devin Abrams
- Episode 4: Anna Scarlett, Temepara George, Sione Faumuina, Joe Cotton
- Episode 5: Mikey Havoc, Simon Doull, Will Wallace, Chris Belbin

=== Charities ===
- NZ Breast Cancer Foundation
- Kidz First Children's Hospital
- Starship Children's Hospital
- Starship Foundation
- Special Olympics NZ
- SPCA
