= Lee Nelson (poker player) =

New Zealand poker player (born 1943)

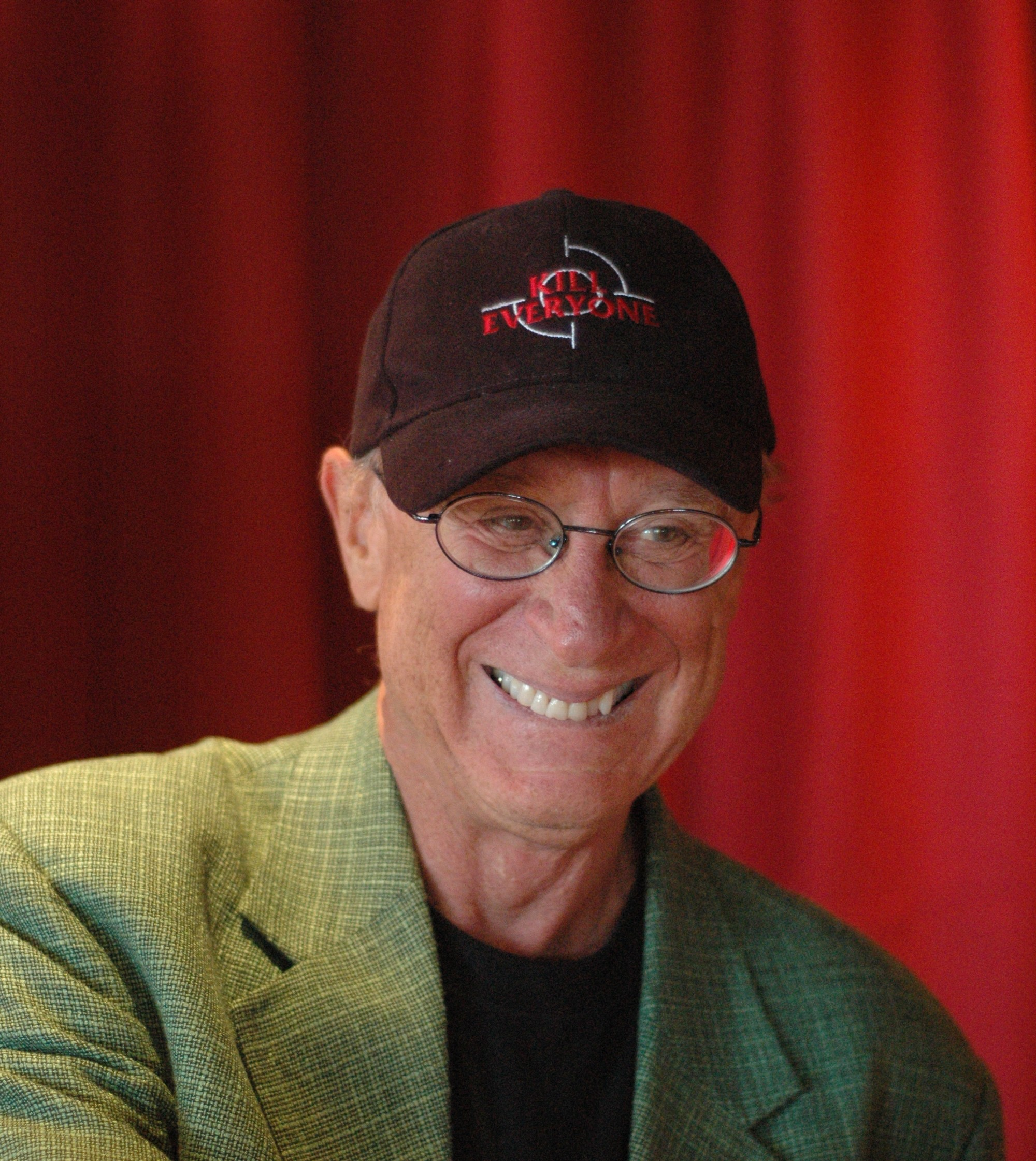
- Nelson in 2008
- Nickname: Final Table
- Born: 19 January 1943 (age 83); United States

Lee Nelson (born 19 January 1943) is a retired New Zealand doctor and now a professional poker player. He was born in the United States.

== Poker ==
In 2004, Nelson won the St. Maarten's event in December of that year. Because he wore a Hawaiian shirt to the final table, it became his signature outfit when he reaches the final table.

Nelson is a regular on the Australasian poker tournament circuit, having won two events at the 2005 Crown Australian Poker Championship. In April 2005, Nelson won the PartyPoker World Open in Maidstone, Kent, England, winning the $400,000 first prize after defeating "Gentleman" Liam Flood in the final heads-up confrontation. He also made the semi-finals of the VC Cup that year whilst in England. In January 2006, Nelson won the main event of the Crown Australian Poker Championship, taking home A$1,295,800. That also granted him a lifetime entry pass to the annual event, which he does return annually. As of 2022, Nelson's total live tournament winnings exceed $2,500,000.

Nelson was inducted in the Australian Poker Hall of Fame in 2009, and he won the $1,100 pot limit Omaha tournament in Aussie Millions side event. He previously represented PokerStars as one of the poker professionals on their "Team PokerStars".

Nelson is also the co-author (with Blair Rodman) of the poker strategy book Kill Phil: The Fast Track to Success in No-Limit Hold 'em Poker Tournaments (ISBN 0-929712-24-2), "Let's Play Poker" and a sequel to "Kill Phil" (named after many top poker players at the time named Phil: Phil Galfond, Phil Gordon, Phil Hellmuth, Phil Ivey and Phil Laak), "Kill Everyone." Nelson co-hosted Joker Poker with Mike Goldman on Network 10 in Australia and also co-hosted the New Zealand version on TV3 with Brooke Howard-Smith. Nelson provided expert commentary and explanations of poker rules and strategy to viewers.

Nelson is based in Auckland.

== Other pursuits ==
Lee's areas of medical interest are nutrition and wellness and longevity medicine. Lee is also recognized for his book on prostate cancer: Prostate Cancer Prevention and Cure.

He has recently built and opened an oceanfront wellness retreat at the border of the Abel Tasman National Park, near Nelson, New Zealand, that provides wellness programs for guests, including functional food, shiatsu massage, acupuncture, meditation, and exercise (especially walks, kayaking, and swimming with the seals in the National Park). Lee is the Retreat's Director and conducts optional personal wellness programs for guests. The Retreat was submitted for the New Zealand Architectural Awards in 2010.
