= Fear Factor (Australian game show) =

- Genre: Stunt/dare Game show
- Based on: Fear Factor
- Presented by: Marc Yellin
- Country of origin: Australia
- Original language: English
- No. of seasons: 1
- No. of episodes: 7

Production
- Running time: 60 minutes
- Production company: Southern Star Endemol

Original release
- Network: Nine Network
- Release: 19 February – 2 April 2002

Fear Factor is an Australian stunt/dare reality game show. It originally aired on Nine Network in 2002, but was abruptly cancelled after only 3 episodes, with the show's cancellation being announced during the end credits of the third episode with: "that was the final fear factor in this series". The program was hosted by Marc Yellin. The show pitted contestants against each other in a variety of stunts; each winner over the first six weeks received a small prize, then returned to compete against each other in a championship episode for the show's grand prize of AU $50,000.

Despite its abrupt cancellation, the entire 7-episode series was later aired in the United States on Chiller during 2011 and 2012.
