= Bree Amer =

Australian television personality

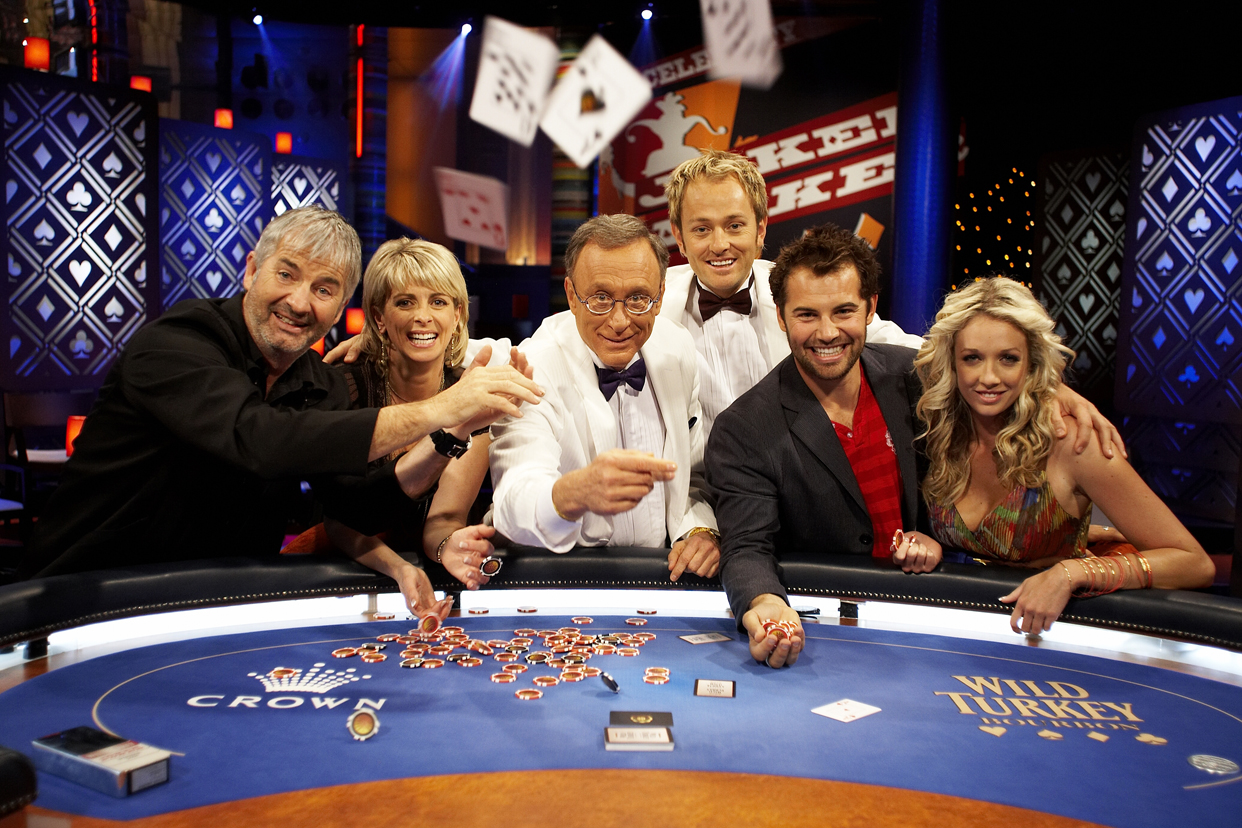
- Bree Amer (right) in a Joker Poker promotional shot
- Born: 17 August 1982 (age 43); Gold Coast, Australia
- Television: Big Brother season 4; Big Brother season 5; Big Brother season 6; Big Brother season 7; Big Brother season 8

Bree Amer (born 17 August 1982) is an Australian television personality.

== Biography ==
Amer was a contestant on Big Brother Australia 2004 from the Gold Coast, in Queensland, and the first housemate of Big Brother Australia to re-enter the House when, hours after her eviction, it was discovered the votes were miscalculated. She was returned to the House the night after, and a few days after that, in a special eviction show, the actual person to have received the most votes, Wesley Dening, was evicted.

Having worked in theatre restaurants, Amer co-hosted the Big Brother Friday Night Live games in the 2005 series of Big Brother Australia with Mike Goldman and fellow 2004 series Housemate, Ryan Fitzgerald. The same hosting team went on to front Friday Night Games in early 2006, and later continued as hosts of Big Brother Friday Night Live in the 2007 and 2008 series of Big Brother.

She co-hosted the Australian show Download along with Ryan Fitzgerald and Mike Goldman. In May 2011 Sydney-based author, Amanda Cole, issued Who Needs Prince Charming?, a self-realisation book for women, which collated contributions from 35 Australian women including Amer, Bianca Dye, Camilla Franks, Kathryn Eisman, Bessie Bardot, Molly Contogeorge, Tania Zaetta and Cindy Pan.

== Personal life ==
On 29 July 2006, The Sydney Morning Herald reported that a doctor noticed a lump on Amer's neck while watching a broadcast of Friday Night Live, and urged her to see a doctor. Amer has since undergone two surgeries for removal of thyroid cancer, and also had radiation therapy. However, she is now healthy again. Amer married TV producer Evan Wilkes on 7 November 2015 and together they have had two sons, Archie who was stillborn in April 2015, and a son who was born February 2017. Amer then had a daughter in 2019.
