= Big Brother (Australian TV series) season 4 =

Big Brother
- Season 4
- Presented by: Gretel Killeen
- No. of days: 86
- No. of housemates: 16
- Winner: Trevor Butler
- Runner-up: Bree Amer
- Companion shows: Big Brother Nominations; Big Brother: Uncut; Big Brother: UpLate
- No. of episodes: 109 (+ 60 UpLate)

Release
- Original network: Network Ten
- Original release: 2 May – 26 July 2004

Season chronology
- ← Previous; Season 3 Next → Season 5

The fourth season of the Australian reality television series, Big Brother, also known as Big Brother 2004, was aired on Network Ten, starting on Sunday 2 May 2004, with the housemates entering the day before, and ended on Monday 26 July 2004, lasting 86 days. The season was billed as "back to basics, but with one small secret". In a return to the basic format of the first two seasons, which had been eschewed in favour of twists and surprises in the previous season, all housemates were let into the house together and former surprise elements such as swimming pools and gym equipment were all exposed from the beginning.

The only main twist of the series was the prize money - which was raised from $250,000 to $1,000,000, but this was kept hidden from housemates until later in the season. Evicted housemates also received larger prizes than any season before, with every evictee receiving a top of the range Mitsubishi Lancer VR-X. The fourth season saw a change in the voice of Big Brother. Peter Abbott, who had provided the voice for the series from 2001 to 2003, departed the role prior to the 2004 season. The voice was subsequently provided by Nick Colquhoun, who had a more stern tone than in earlier years. However, the stricter and more authoritarian portrayal of Big Brother that became prominent in later seasons had not yet fully developed, with the harsher disciplinary style and frequent fines becoming more associated with the 2005–2007 series.

Two Intruders entered the house later in the game, and Miriam Rivera, the transgender star of the show There's Something About Miriam, entered as a houseguest near the end. The two Intruders were some of the least liked in all the four seasons, with Violeta being chosen for eviction by every single housemate, and then Monica, who already had a boyfriend outside, immediately started falling for Ryan, and she and Bree developed rivalry towards each other. When Monica was finally up for eviction, she was evicted with a large percentage of the votes. Mid-season, the housemates were able to see the unofficial premiere of The Day After Tomorrow. The final contestants in 2004 were Bree Amer and Trevor Butler. Trevor won, and then proposed to his girlfriend on stage. The winner announced of the finale was watched by 2.864 million Australian viewers, making it the second most-watched television program in Australia that year.

== Opening sequence ==
The opening sequence was similar to the 2003 opening sequence with some minor sound changes. The background colour is more gradient than the previous season. A scene of a green backyard appears between the diary room and kitchen scenes. The diary room chair is orange instead of red, and the evicted housemate in the titles was changed to blue. Lastly the 84 days was changed to the series 86 days. The theme also was slightly remixed with the introduction of a guitar component.

== Housemates ==
Name	Age on entry	Day entered	Day exited	Result
Trevor Butler	30	0	86	Winner
Bree Amer	21	0	86 (Note: Bree briefly left the house after being incorrectly evicted on Day 65. When the error was discovered, she was asked if she wanted to return, and she accepted. She was placed in lockdown after the Eviction Show and returned during Nominations on Day 66.)	Runner-up
Paul Dyer	31	0	85	Evicted
Ryan Fitzgerald	27	0	83	Evicted
Catherine Tremolada	33	0	78	Evicted
Ashalea McWalters	19	0	71	Evicted
Monica de Balso	32	55	71	Evicted
Wesley Dening	20	0	68	Evicted
Violeta Black	20	55	59	Evicted
Kane Dignum	20	0	57	Evicted
Terri Mann	31	0	50	Evicted
Merlin Luck	23	0	43	Evicted
Bree "Elle" Quartermaine	22	0	36	Evicted
Krystal Ince	20	0	29	Evicted
Igor Vurmeski	27	0	22	Evicted
Aphrodite Vuitton	25	0	15	Evicted

== Nominations table ==
Color key:

Winner
Runner-up
Nominated
Exempt
No Nominations
Intruder Vote
Votes to Save
Falsely evicted
Evicted

	Week 2	Week 3	Week 4	Week 5	Week 6	Week 7	Week 8	Week 9		Week 10	Week 11	Week 12			Nominations points received
	Week 2	Week 3	Week 4	Week 5	Week 6	Week 7	Week 8	Nominations	Intruder Eviction	To Save	Week 11	Day 83	Day 85	Finale	Nominations points received
Trevor	2–Igor; 1–Terri	2–Igor; 1–Paul	2–Paul; 1–Ashalea	2–Paul; 1–Ashalea	2–Merlin; 1–Paul	2–Terri; 1–Ashalea	2–Wesley; 1–Ashalea	~~2–Paul~~; ~~1–Ashalea~~	Violeta	~~Ryan~~; ~~Wesely~~	2–Paul; 1–Catherine	2–Paul; 1–Bree	No nominations	Winner (Day 86)	10
Bree	2–Terri; 1–Igor	2–Terri; 1–Igor	2–Terri; 1–Kane	2–Terri; 1–Paul	2–Terri; 1–Paul	2–Wesley; 1–Ryan	2–Kane; 1–Paul	~~2–Paul~~; ~~1–Wesley~~	Violeta	Falsely evicted (Day 64)	2–Paul; 1–Ryan	2–Paul; 1–Ryan	No nominations	Runner-Up (Day 86)	24
Paul	2–Aphrodite; 1–Igor	2–Elle; 1–Merlin	2–Merlin; 1–Krystal	2–Elle; 1–Trevor	2–Merlin; 1–Catherine	2–Ashalea; 1–Catherine	2–Trevor; 1–Bree	~~2–Trevor~~; ~~1–Bree~~	Violeta	~~Ryan~~; ~~Wesely~~	2–Trevor; 1–Ryan	2–Ryan; 1–Trevor	No nominations	Evicted (Day 85)	37
Ryan	2–Igor; 1–Aphrodite	2–Igor; 1–Terri	2–Krystal; 1–Terri	2–Terri; 1–Ashalea	2–Catherine; 1–Terri	2–Bree; 1–Terri	2–Ashalea; 1–Bree	~~2–Ashalea~~; ~~1–Paul~~	Violeta	~~Trevor~~; ~~Paul~~	2–Catherine; 1–Bree	2–Bree; 1–Paul	Evicted (Day 83)		17
Catherine	2–Ashalea; 1–Igor	2–Igor; 1–Terri	2–Paul; 1–Ashalea	2–Paul; 1–Terri	2–Merlin; 1–Trevor	2–Terri; 1–Ryan	2–Kane; 1–Ryan	~~2–Paul~~; ~~1–Ashalea~~	Violeta	~~Trevor~~; ~~Ashalea~~	2–Ryan; 1–Bree	Evicted (Day 78)			15
Ashalea	2–Igor; 1–Paul	2–Elle; 1–Merlin	2–Elle; 1–Trevor	2–Elle; 1–Kane	2–Merlin; 1–Kane	2–Wesley; 1–Kane	2–Wesley; 1–Ryan	~~2–Ryan~~; ~~1–Catherine~~	Violeta	~~Trevor~~; ~~Paul~~	Evicted (Day 71)				40
Monica	Not in House							~~2–Ashalea~~; ~~1–Bree~~	Nominated	~~Catherine~~; ~~Ryan~~	Evicted (Day 71)				N/A
Wesley	2–Aphrodite; 1–Krystal	2–Ashalea; 1–Krystal	2–Ashalea; 1–Bree	2–Elle; 1–Ashalea	2–Bree; 1–Catherine	2–Bree; 1–Catherine	2–Ashalea; 1–Catherine	~~2–Ryan~~; ~~1–Catherine~~	Violeta	~~Paul~~; ~~Catherine~~	Evicted (Day 68)				9
Violeta	Not in House							~~2–Ashalea~~; ~~Bree~~	Nominated	Evicted (Day 59)					N/A
Kane	2–Elle; 1–Catherine	2–Krystal; 1–Elle	2–Krystal; 1–Terri	2–Elle; 1–Terri	2–Ashalea; 1–Catherine	Ashalea; Terri	2–Bree; 1–Ashalea	Evicted (Day 57)							11
Terri	2–Igor; 1–Catherine	2–Igor; 1–Bree	2–Merlin; 1–Krystal	2–Bree; 1–Ryan	2–Bree; 1–Ashalea	2–Ashalea; 1–Kane	Evicted (Day 50)								37
Merlin	2–Igor; 1–Terri	2–Igor; 1–Terri	2–Paul; 1–Terri	2–Paul; 1–Terri	2–Paul; 1–Terri	Evicted (Day 43)									15
Elle	2–Igor; 1–Kane	2–Igor; 1–Terri	2–Ashalea; 1–Krystal	2–Ashalea; Ryan	Evicted (Day 36)										19
Krystal	2–Igor; 1–Aphrodite	2–Igor; 1–Terri	2–Terri; 1–Merlin	Evicted (Day 29)											13
Igor	2–Krystal; 1–Ashalea	2–Elle; 1–Kane	Evicted (Day 22)												32
Aphrodite	2–Terri; 1–Paul	Evicted (Day 15)													6
Notes	none							1, 2	3	4	none		5	6	
Nominated	Aphrodite, Igor, Terri	Elle, Igor, Terri	Ashalea, Krystal, Paul, Terri	Elle, Paul, Terri	Bree, Catherine, Merlin, Paul, Terri	Ashalea, Bree, Terri, Wesley	Ashalea, Bree, Kane, Wesley	Ashalea, Bree, Catherine, Paul, Ryan, Trevor, Wesley	Monica, Violeta	Ashalea, Bree, Catherine, Monica, Paul, Ryan, Trevor	Catherine, Paul, Ryan	Bree, Paul, Ryan	Bree, Paul, Trevor	Paul, Trevor	
Evicted	Aphrodite; 45% to evict	Igor; 47% to evict	Krystal; 41% to evict	Elle; 36% to evict	Merlin; 46% to evict	Terri; 41% to evict	Kane; 36% to evict	Bree falsely evicted	Violeta; 7 of 7 votes to evict	Monica; 43% (out of 7) to evict	Catherine; 41% to evict	Ryan; 37% to evict	Paul; Most votes to evict	Bree; Most votes to evict	
Evicted	Aphrodite; 45% to evict	Igor; 47% to evict	Krystal; 41% to evict	Elle; 36% to evict	Merlin; 46% to evict	Terri; 41% to evict	Kane; 36% to evict	Wesley; 23.3% to evict	Violeta; 7 of 7 votes to evict	Ashalea; 24% (out of 6) to evict	Catherine; 41% to evict	Ryan; 37% to evict	Paul; Most votes to evict	Bree; Most votes to evict	
Saved	Igor; 35% Terri; 20%	Terri; 35% Elle; 18%	Paul; 32% Terri; 21% Ashalea; 6%	Terri; 34% Paul; 30%	??? 19% ??? 18% ??? 13% ??? 4%	??? 24% ??? 21% ??? 14%	??? 28% ??? 19% ??? 17%	Bree; 18.4% ??? 17.4% ??? 15.4% ??? 14.2% ??? 7.4% ??? 3.9%	Monica; 0 of 7 votes	??? 22% ??? 21% ??? 16% ??? 14% ??? 3%	??? 33% ??? 26%	??? 35% ??? 28%	Bree; Trevor	Trevor; Fewest votes to evict	

=== Notes ===
- ^Note 1: All Housemates were nominated by Big Brother after most Housemates failed to give reasonable nomination reasons. Had this not happened, only Ashalea, Ryan, and Paul would have been nominated. Intruders Violeta and Monica, had Immunity but were able to vote.
- ^Note 2: On Day 64, Bree was incorrectly announced as the Week 9 evictee. Bree later returned to the House on Day 65, and the correct evictee, Wesley, was evicted on Day 68.
- ^Note 3: On Day 59, the two Intruders faced a House Vote, in which the Original Housemates would vote to evict one Intruder. The Housemates evicted Violeta.
- ^Note 4: Week 10 was a Double Eviction with all Housemates nominated. During Nominations, Housemates voted for the Housemates they wanted to save from Eviction - These Nominations did not count. As Wesley had not yet been evicted from the house, he participated in the Nominations. As Bree had not yet re-entered, she did not vote in Nominations. Further, as a result of an audit in relation to Week 9's Eviction, voting for Week 10's Eviction only opened after Wesley was evicted on Day 68.
- ^Note 5: There were no Nominations in Week 12. The final three housemates automatically faced Australia's Vote.
- ^Note 6: For the finale, Australia voted to evict between the final two housemates. The winner of Big Brother Australia 2004 and the $1,000,000 grand prize would be the finalist with the fewest votes to evict.

== Special episodes ==
A number of special episodes aired during the original run of the season. These included:

=== The Secret Revealed ===
'The Secret Revealed' was the show's launch night, in which the new housemates were introduced, and the Million Dollar Secret was revealed to the nation.

=== Housemate Secrets ===
'Housemate Secrets' was aired on the first Sunday of the season, in which the housemates were told to give out statements about themselves, two of which were lies, and one was the truth.

=== Meeting Miriam ===
A special episode introducing Miriam Rivera, the transgender star of the show There's Something About Miriam.

=== The Secret's Out ===
This episode saw housemates play a series of games to decide who would be the first amongst the housemates to learn of Big Brother's secret.

=== The Intruders ===
This episode introduced the season's Intruders.

=== Intruder Eviction ===
Aired on Day 59, this episode saw the housemates decide who they wanted to evict.

=== The Recount ===
Aired following the eviction of the wrong housemate, and Bree's subsequent return, a special eviction show aired to confirm the correct evictee.

== Controversy and incidents ==
- Paul was criticised for his treatment of fellow housemate Merlin during an argument over his Australian citizenship status, with the confrontation nearly escalating into a physical fight before Big Brother intervened. Paul was also criticised for persisting in the confrontation after Merlin began sobbing, during which Paul reportedly told him, “Crying won’t get you out of this one,” and followed him as he attempted to walk away. The two were involved in one of the most heated and confrontational arguments in Big Brother history. Past seasons have shown that audiences may tolerate playful or mischievous behaviour, but tend to react negatively when it crosses a line.
- Housemate Merlin Luck staged a protest at his live eviction show. Upon entering the arena, he revealed a makeshift banner which read "Free Th Refugees". The letter E had fallen off and it was intended to read "Free The Refugees" in reference to Australian Government policy of mandatory detention of asylum seekers. Merlin placed gaffer tape over his mouth and refused to speak during the live show. The following night, when he returned to appear as a guest on the Nomination show, he apologised to Killeen for putting her on the spot and making her job difficult by refusing to speak during the eviction show. On this show Merlin spoke about his actions in the highest rating show of the timeslot for that night.
- The producers were criticised for making a deal with housemate Ryan Fitzgerald who was permitted to wear a T-shirt that was branded with "MLS" (acronym for Massive Loser Squad). The T-shirts were being sold while the show was running and Ryan's friends admitted that a proportion of the profits was going towards votes to keep him in the house, thus giving him what was perceived to be an unfair advantage. However the producer pointed-out that many housemates had companies or local communities rally support for them, which was a little different, and that there was nothing stopping any other housemate's supporters doing a similar thing to Ryan's friends. Ryan has instead insisted on his radio program that his friends were not using the money to buy votes and instead spending it on alcohol.
- Housemate Bree Amer was incorrectly evicted instead of Wesley due to a vote counting error. The error was discovered after the Sunday night eviction show. Bree had already met up with friends and family. She was returned to the house the following night (Monday). Wesley was evicted in a special show on the following Thursday.
- Miriam Rivera's introductory video, including host Gretel Killeen’s remark, “This isn’t about deception, it’s about the reception,” and the ensuing interview segment, was later described by critics as awkward and degrading, with the public narrative surrounding the program widely regarded as being at Rivera's expense. Rather than centering on her as an individual, the show relied on a familiar "gotcha" trope, framing the premise around contestants being "tricked" into expressing romantic interest in a model without knowing she was transgender. Following Rivera's entry into the house, the narrative continued to focus heavily on speculation surrounding her gender identity. Producers highlighted moments of suspicion by housemates, including an instance in which housemate Ryan suggested Rivera was "a bloke," framing it as a dramatic revelation. While such discussions were presented as entertainment for audiences at the time, they were later criticised for contributing to Rivera's public humiliation.

== Reception ==
=== Australian TV ratings ===
MONDAY - FRIDAY DAILY SHOW

WEEK	Sydney	Melbourne	Brisbane	Adelaide	Perth	TOTAL	WEEKLY RANK
01	356,000	343,000	256,000	137,000	152,000	1,243,000	46
02	299,000	281,000	222,000	115,000	145,000	1,062,000	58
03	312,000	268,000	199,000	110,000	148,000	1,037,000	70
04	, 000	, 000	, 000	, 000	, 000	, 000	
05	311,000	296,000	208,000	121,000	146,000	1,082,000	65
06	325,000	278,000	195,000	116,000	148,000	1,063,000	66
07	341,000	294,000	221,000	132,000	131,000	1,119,000	49
08	289,000	272,000	233,000	126,000	133,000	1,052,000	65
09	302,000	287,000	242,000	135,000	133,000	1,100,000	57
10	309,000	322,000	234,000	141,000	132,000	1,138,000	45
11	328,000	302,000	231,000	143,000	121,000	1,124,000	53
12	357,000	307,000	249,000	100,000	124,000	2,191,000'	46
