= Friday Night Games =

- Created by: Endemol Southern Star
- Presented by: Mike Goldman; Bree Amer; Ryan ‘Fitzy’ Fitzgerald
- Country of origin: Australia
- Original language: English
- No. of seasons: 1
- No. of episodes: 10

Production
- Running time: approx. 70 minutes with commercials
- Production company: Endemol Southern Star

Original release
- Network: Network Ten
- Release: 17 February – 21 April 2006

Friday Night Games was a spin-off from Big Brother Australia's Friday Night Live, hosted by Mike Goldman (Blue Coordinator only in the Grand Final) with Bree Amer (Green Coordinator) and Ryan "Fitzy" Fitzgerald (Yellow Coordinator) and was produced at Dreamworld, Gold Coast, Australia by Network Ten.

Two teams, each composed of three celebrities and one chosen contestant (dubbed the "celeb-to-be"), competed and tested their skills in a series of games and challenges. Each game had a different set of rules and difficulty rating.

The "celeb-to-be" was chosen out of hundreds of applicants, most being eliminated through challenges until a final challenge on the Friday Night Games set. Challenges included holding onto a balloon whilst riding "Wipeout", or holding a piece of paper above their head whilst riding on the Tower Of Terror, a roller coaster at Dreamworld, without ripping it.

During each Game there would be a referee (or ref for short) which the crowd booed at. At the grand final the ref was booed off stage and The ref Gave the crowd The Finger.However this was edited out.

Each episode was pre-recorded in front of a live audience at Dreamworld's games arena and aired on Friday nights. The ultimate Friday Night Games Champion Team won a A$50,000 donation to the charity of their choice, courtesy of Supercheap Auto.

Slightly less than half of the show's episodes are still lost to this day. Episodes 2, 4, 6, 7 and 10 have been found in their entirety and Episode 8 has had 47 minutes of its 64 minutes run time discovered. A six-minute ending to Episode 9 also exists. All of these full episodes and clips are available for viewing on YouTube. Everything else from the show still remains lost.

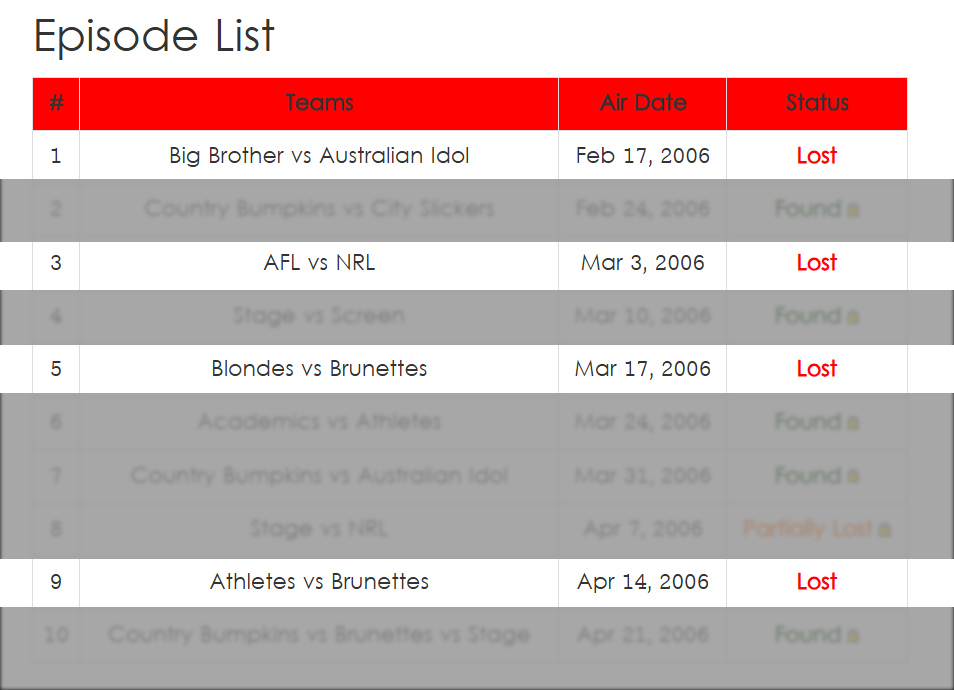
remaining lost episodes

== Episodes ==
The winner of each episode is marked in Bold.

No. in series	Title	Original release date
1	"Big Brother vs **Australian Idol**"	17 February 2006
2	"**Country Bumpkins** vs City Slickers"	24 February 2006
3	"AFL vs **NRL**"	3 March 2006
4	"**Stage** vs Screen"	10 March 2006
5	"Blondes vs **Brunettes**"	17 March 2006
6	"Academics vs **Athletes**"	24 March 2006
7	"Pre-Final #1 - **Country Bumpkins** vs Australian Idol"	31 March 2006
8	"Pre-Final #2 - **Stage** vs NRL"	7 April 2006
9	"Pre-Final #3 - Athletes vs **Brunettes**"	14 April 2006
10	"Grand Final - Country Bumpkins vs **Brunettes** vs Stage"	21 April 2006

The Brunettes, consisting of Patrick Harvey, Craig Lowndes, team captain Ricki-Lee Coulter and Celeb-to-be Karyn, were the winners of the series. They chose to give the $50,000 to Beyond Blue.
