= Ryan Fitzgerald (footballer) =

Australian rules footballer and media personality

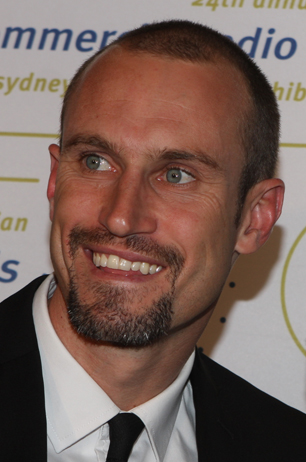

Personal information
- Full name: Ryan James Fitzgerald
- Nickname: Fitzy
- Born: 16 October 1976 (age 50); Adelaide, South Australia
- Original team: South Adelaide (SANFL)
- Draft: 1. 4, 1998 National Draft, Sydney
- Height: 199 cm (6 ft 6 in)
- Weight: 96 kg (212 lb)
- Position: Forward

Playing career^{1}
Years	Club	Games (Goals)
1999–2001	Sydney	10 (15)
2002	Adelaide	8 (8)
Total		18 (23)
- ^{1} Playing statistics correct to the end of 2002.

Ryan James Fitzgerald (born 16 October 1976) is an Australian radio personality, television presenter, comedian and former Australian rules footballer. After being drafted from the South Adelaide Football Club, he made his Australian Football League debut for Sydney in 2000, before being traded to Adelaide, where he played eight games in 2002. Fitzgerald appeared as a contestant in Big Brother Australia 2004, beginning a wider media career in television on Channel 10's Saturday night AFL show Before The Game.

== Early life ==
Fitzgerald attended Wirreanda High School and played junior football for Port Noarlunga.

== AFL career: 2000–2002 ==
A tall forward drafted by the Sydney Swans with the 4th overall selection in the 1998 AFL draft from South Australian National Football League club, South Adelaide, Fitzgerald was unable to make his AFL debut until 2000 due to a shoulder injury. On debut, Fitzgerald kicked five goals and "looked set for a big career". He played nine more games for the rest of the season. At the start of 2001, Fitzgerald injured his knee, requiring a reconstruction that resulted in him missing the entire season. In 2002, he was traded to the Adelaide Crows, but only played eight games for the Crows before retiring from AFL football due to another ACL injury that required a reconstruction.

== Television and radio career ==
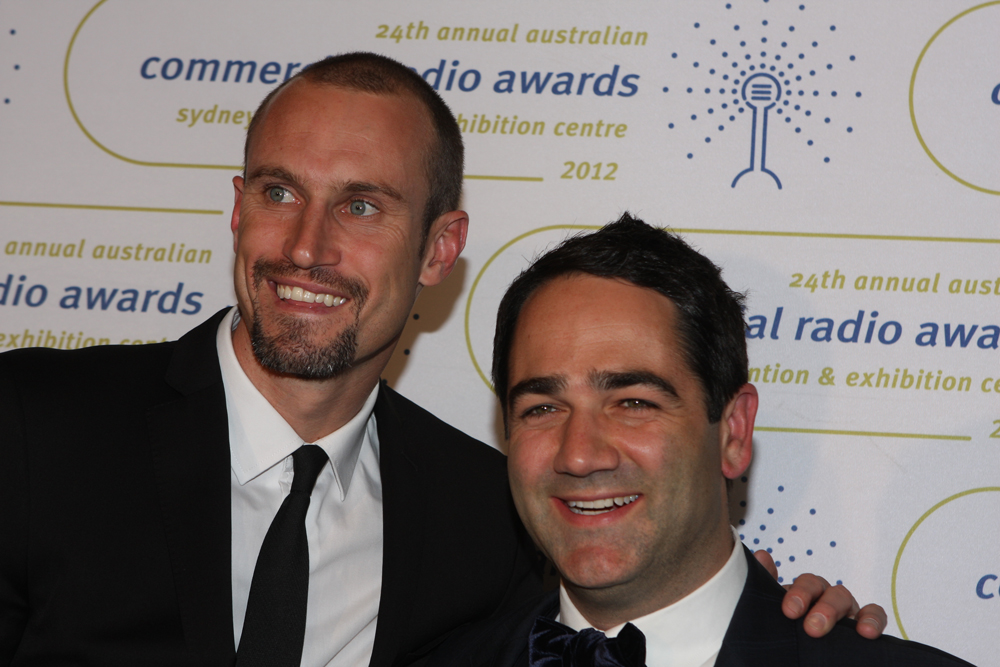
Fitzy and Wippa

Fitzgerald has appeared on The Project, Studio 10, Before The Game, Reality Check, All Star Family Feud, The Front Bar and Hughesy, We Have a Problem.

Fitzgerald was a contestant in Big Brother Australia in 2004, and finished in fourth place at the conclusion of the show. After that, he became co-host of the Adelaide Nova 91.9 breakfast show and made occasional appearances on Before The Game (AFL). In 2005, he had a new role as a co-host on the new Friday night Big Brother Australia show Friday Night Live with fellow Big Brother contestant Bree Amer, which became a stand-alone show in its own right in 2006 as Friday Night Games.

This show then returned as Friday Night Download, featuring internet videos. It was cancelled early in its second season.

In October 2010, Fitzgerald announced that he would be leaving Nova 91.9 Breakfast to be a part of Nova's drive show Fitzy & Wippa with co-host Michael Wipfli, which then became the Nova 96.9 Sydney breakfast show. The pair was nominated for the 2011 Australian Commercial Radio Awards in the best on-air team, metro FM category.

Fitzgerald is also a regular player in the E. J. Whitten Legends Game.

In 2012, he made his acting debut on the seventh episode of the Nine Network series House Husbands.

In 2016, Fitzgerald joined Wipfli to co-host the Nine Network show 20 to 1.

Fitzgerald also appears on The Front Bar, covering for the absence of regular panellists Mick Molloy or Sam Pang.

In February 2026, Fitzy, Wippa & Kate moved from Nova 96.9 Sydney breakfast to host a national drive show.
