= Australian Survivor season 6 =

Australian Survivor
- Season 6
- Presented by: Jonathan LaPaglia
- No. of days: 50
- No. of castaways: 24
- Winner: Pia Miranda
- Runner-up: Baden Gilbert
- Location: Savusavu, Fiji
- No. of episodes: 24

Release
- Original network: Network 10
- Original release: 24 July – 17 September 2019

Additional information
- Filming dates: 4 May – 22 June 2019

Season chronology
- ← Previous; Champions V Contenders Next → All Stars

The sixth season of Australian Survivor, also known as Australian Survivor: Champions V Contenders, is a television series based on the international reality competition franchise Survivor. It is the fourth season to air on Network 10 and was hosted by Jonathan LaPaglia and filmed in the Fijian community of Savusavu.

As with the previous season, the season features 24 contestants divided into two tribes: "Champions", composed of twelve high-achievers who excelled in their fields, and "Contenders", composed of twelve everyday Australians.

It premiered on Wednesday, 24 July 2019, and concluded on 17 September 2019 with Pia Miranda named the winner over Baden Gillbert in a unanimous 9–0 vote, winning the grand prize of A$500,000 and title of Sole Survivor.

== Contestants ==
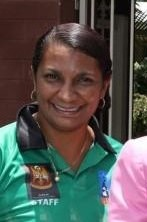
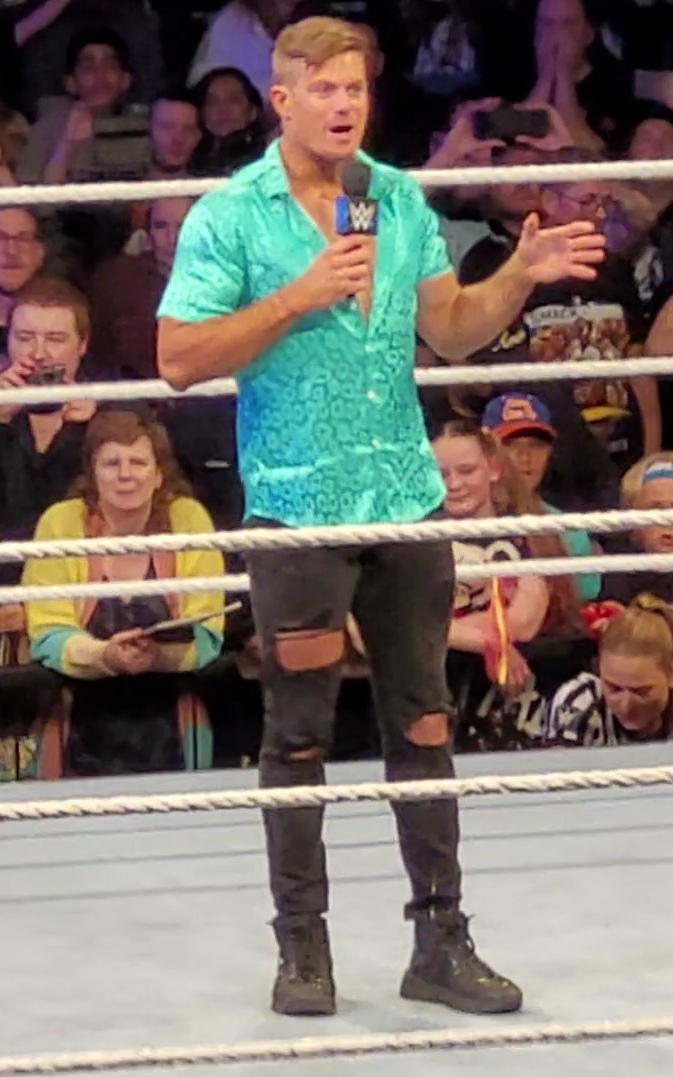
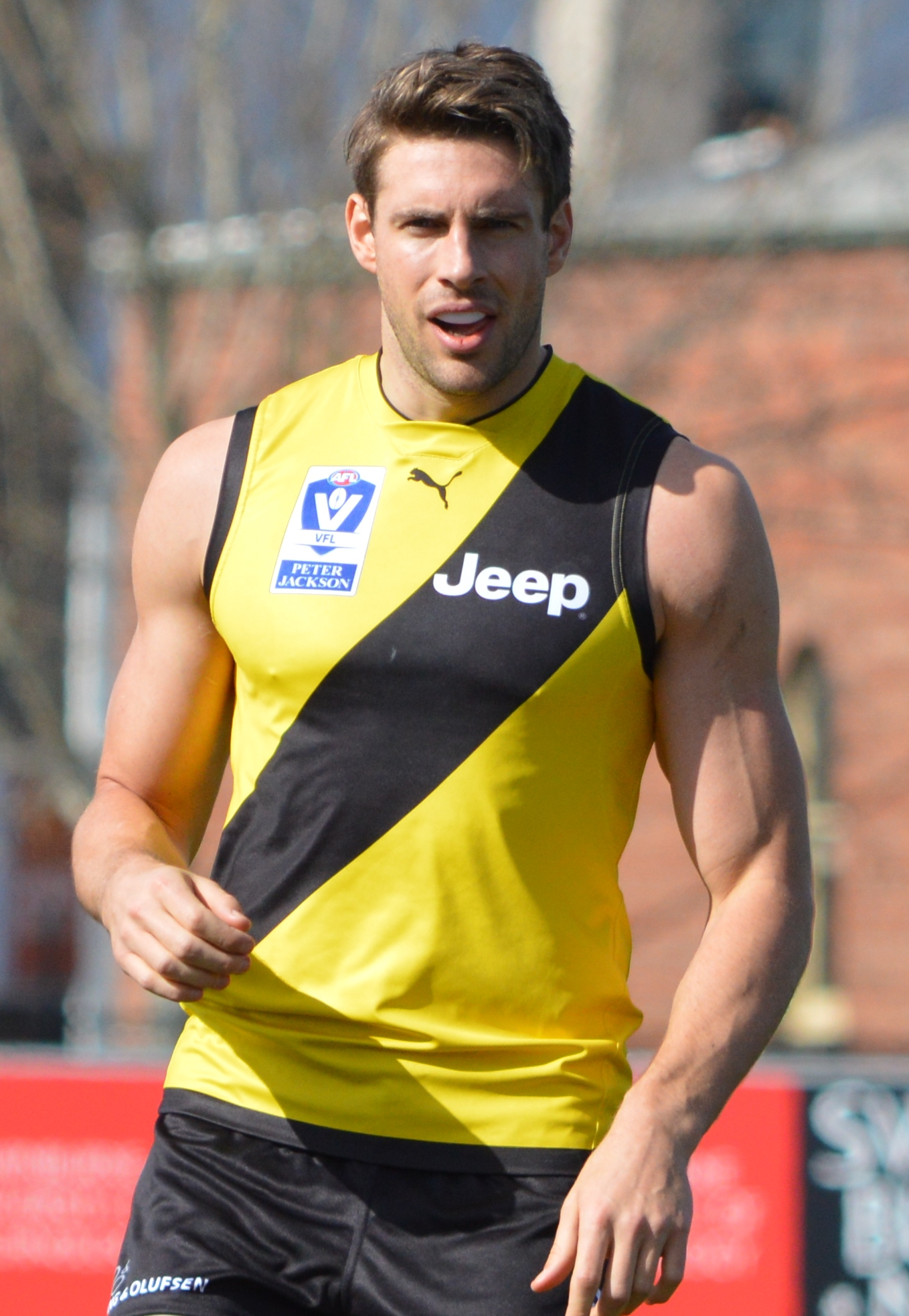
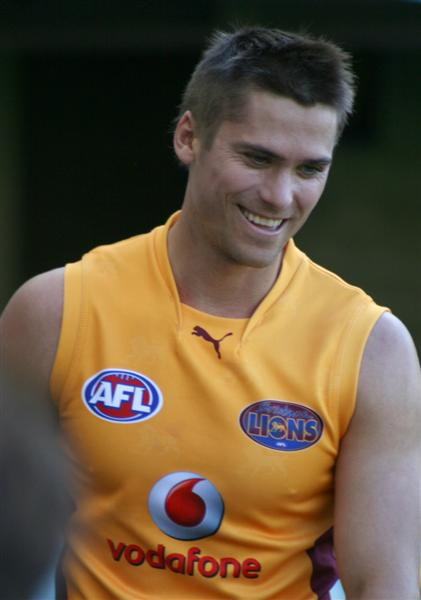
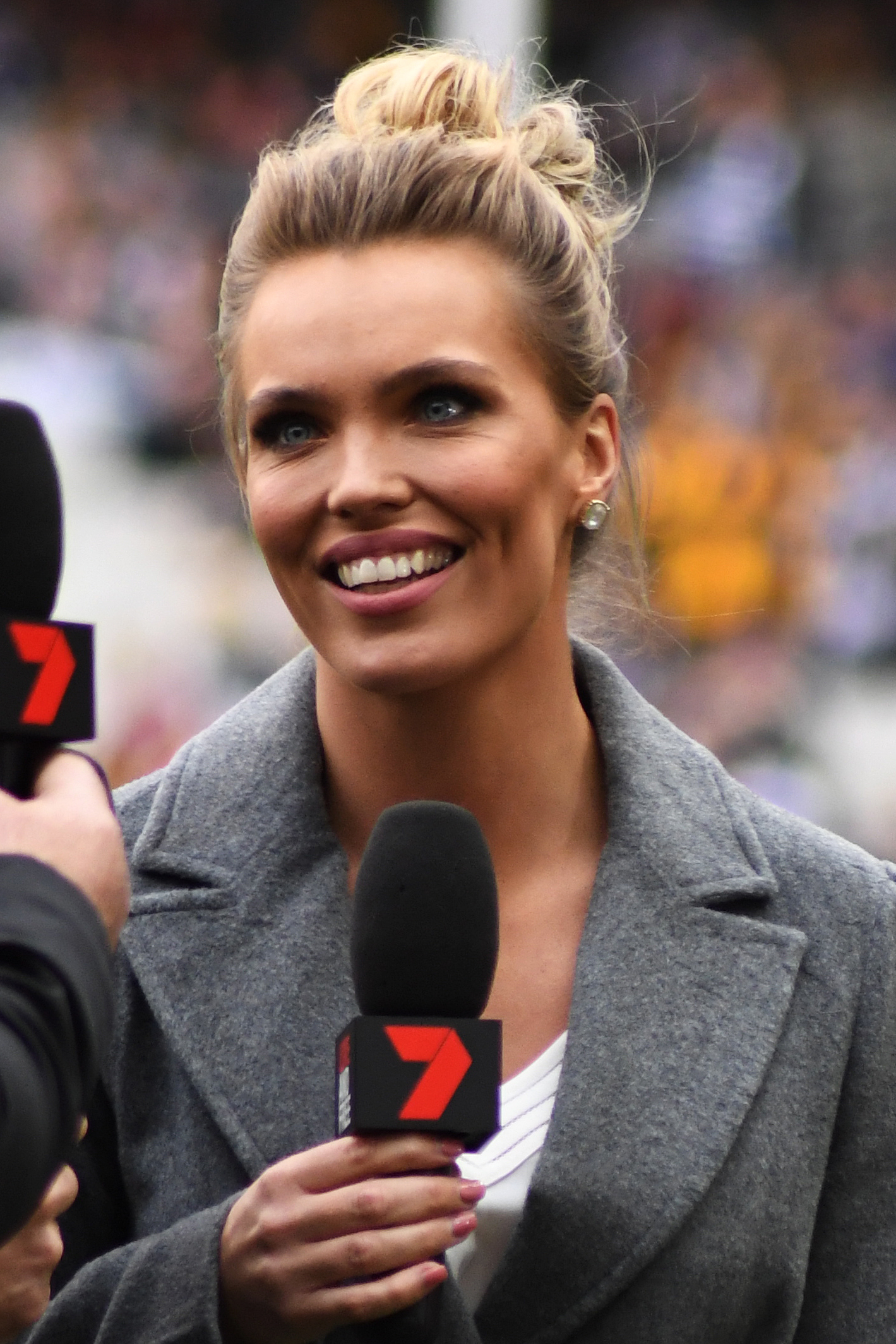
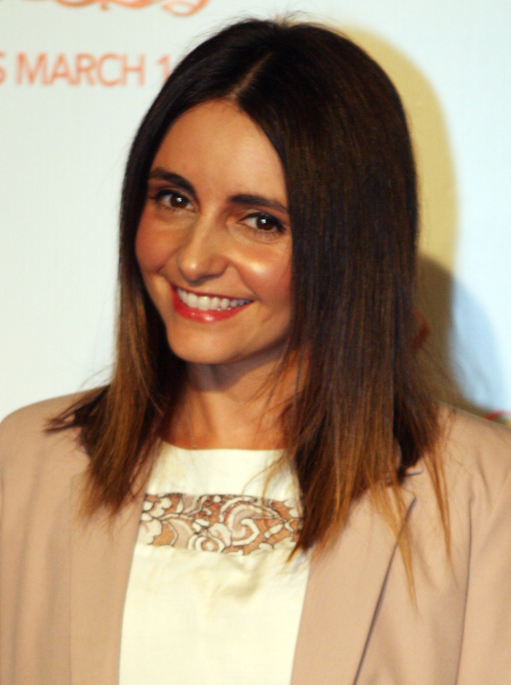
From left to right: Nova Peris, Matt Farrelly, Shaun Hampson, Simon Black, Abbey Holmes and Pia Miranda

The 24 contestants were divided into two tribes based on celebrity status: "Champions," composed of 12 people who have received accolades and fame for their exceptional work in their given fields, and "Contenders," composed of 12 non-celebrities. The Champions include Boost Juice founder and Shark Tank star Janine Allis, former senator, Olympic hockey gold medalist and Olympic sprinter Nova Peris, Olympic speed skating gold medalist Steven Bradbury and Australian Survivor season 4 contestant Luke Toki, who is the first former Australian Survivor player to return for another season. Among the Contenders is professional wrestler Matt Farrelly, former AFL player Shaun Hampson and The Amazing Race Australia 1 contestant Sam Schoers.

List of Australian Survivor season 6 contestants
Contestant	Original tribe	Shuffled tribe	Post-Kidnap Tribe	Merged tribe	Finish
Anastasia Woolmer; 42, Brisbane, Qld; Australian Memory Champion	Champions				1st voted out Day 2
Laura Choong; 31, Sydney, NSW	Contenders				2nd voted out Day 5
Susie Maroney; 44, Cronulla, NSW; Marathon swimmer	Champions				3rd voted out Day 7
Nova Peris; 48, Darwin, NT; Former politician and Olympic athlete	Champions				4th voted out Day 10
Steven Bradbury; 45, Camden, NSW; Olympic speed skater	Champions				5th voted out Day 12
Andrew "E.T." Ettingshausen; 53, Sutherland, NSW; Former NRL player	Champions				6th voted out Day 14
Sam Schoers; 30, Perth, WA	Contenders	Champions			7th voted out Day 16
Sarah Ayles; 45, Adelaide, SA	Contenders	Champions			8th voted out Day 18
Hannah Pentreath; 27, Bendigo, Vic	Contenders	Champions	Champions		9th voted out Day 22
Casey Hawkins; 31, Melbourne, Vic	Contenders	Contenders	Contenders		10th voted out Day 24
Matt Farrelly; 29, Sydney, NSW	Contenders	Contenders	Contenders		11th voted out Day 26
Ross Clarke-Jones; 53, Central Coast, NSW; Big wave surfer	Champions	Contenders	Contenders		Medically evacuated Day 28
Andy Meldrum; 47, Noosa, Qld	Contenders	Champions	Champions	Soli Bula	12th voted out Day 30
Shaun Hampson; 31, Melbourne, Vic	Contenders	Contenders	Champions	Soli Bula	13th voted out 1st jury member Day 32
David Genat; 39, Brooklyn, New York, USA; International supermodel	Champions	Champions	Champions	Soli Bula	14th voted out 2nd jury member Day 34
John Eastoe; 28, Kalgoorlie, WA	Contenders	Champions	Champions	Soli Bula	15th voted out 3rd jury member Day 36
Daisy Richardson; 24, Adavale, Qld	Contenders	Champions	Champions	Soli Bula	Lost exile duel (Note: The 16th and 17th castaways voted out were exiled to Exile Beach. On Day 38 Daisy was the 16th person voted out and on Day 40 Simon became the 17th person voted out. On Day 41, the exiled castaways dueled to remain in the game - the winner returned to the Soli Bula tribe, the loser would be officially eliminated. Simon defeated Daisy in the duel, eliminating Daisy.); 4th jury member Day 41
Simon Black; 40, Brisbane, Qld; Former AFL player	Champions	Contenders	Contenders	Soli Bula	16th voted out 5th jury member Day 42
Janine Allis; 53, Melbourne, Vic; Businesswoman	Champions	Contenders	Contenders	Soli Bula	17th voted out 6th jury member Day 44
Abbey Holmes; 28, Adelaide, SA; AFL Women's player	Champions	Contenders	Contenders	Soli Bula	18th voted out 7th jury member Day 46
Luke Toki; 32, Perth, WA; Australian Survivor 2017	Champions	Champions	Champions	Soli Bula	19th voted out 8th jury member Day 47
Harry Hills; 30, Perth, WA	Contenders	Contenders	Contenders	Soli Bula	20th voted out 9th jury member Day 49
Baden Gilbert; 23, Adelaide, SA	Contenders	Champions	Champions	Soli Bula	Runner-up; Day 50
Pia Miranda; 46, Melbourne, Vic; Actress	Champions	Contenders	Contenders	Soli Bula	Sole Survivor; Day 50

=== Future appearances ===
In 2020, David Genat, John Eastoe, Daisy Richardson, Abbey Holmes and Harry Hills competed on Australian Survivor: All Stars.

in 2022, Andy Meldrum competed on Australian Survivor: Blood V Water with his sister Kate.

In 2023, Shaun Hampson competed as a hero in Australian Survivor: Heroes V Villains.

In 2025, Genat, Janine Allis and Luke Toki competed again on Australian Survivor: Australia V The World.

In 2026, Hills competed on Australian Survivor: Redemption.

Outside of Survivor, Genat competed on the fifth season of The Celebrity Apprentice Australia with Allis appearing on the series as an advisor. In 2021, Steven Bradbury competed on Celebrity Holey Moley. Toki competed on Big Brother VIP. In 2022, Pia Miranda competed on the fourth season of The Masked Singer. Also in 2022, John Eastoe competed on The Challenge: Australia. In 2025, Genat competed on the second season of the American reality show Deal or No Deal Island.

== Season summary ==
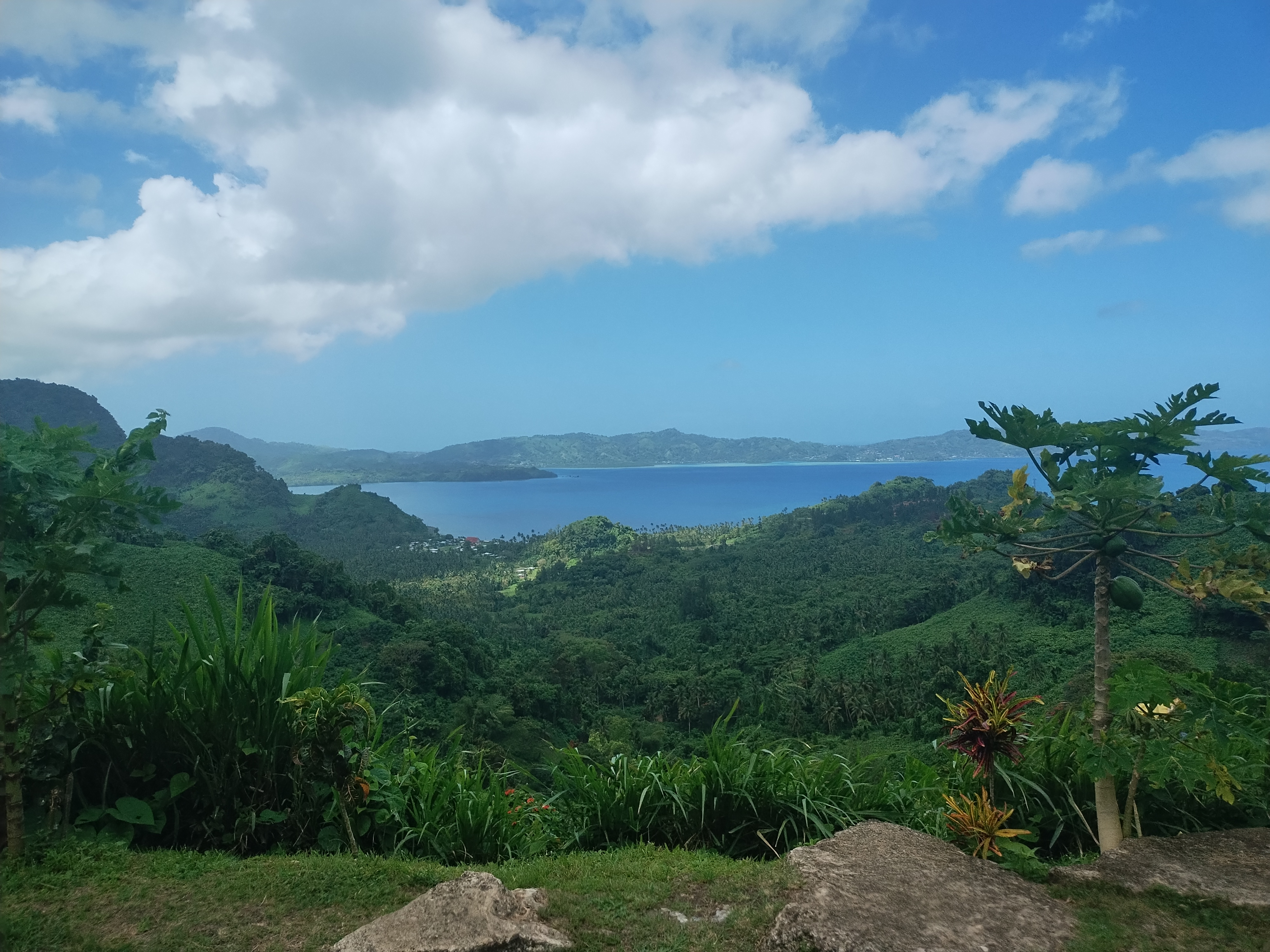
The season filmed in Savusavu in Fiji.

The sequel to last season's theme, 24 contestants were divided into two tribes . 12 Contenders, representing everyday Australians, faced off against the 12 Champions, high achievers in their respective fields. Joining the Champions was Luke from Australian Survivor 2017 as the People's Champion. Despite having a returning player in their tribe, the Champions struggled in challenges with an initial Sporty Seven leading the tribe, until David, Janine, Luke, and Pia managed to get the alliance to turn on themselves. Meanwhile, the Contenders were a united front with Shaun, a former AFL player, and Daisy as a power duo, with Andy and Harry floating in the middle.

Down 11 to 7, the Champions' new alliance were split apart in a tribe swap that left allies David and Luke stranded in a Champions tribe with 7 original Contenders. However, with clever idol plays, and the Contenders working to break up Andy's social game with the women, the duo managed to survive even after a surprise kidnap vote which saw Shaun being stolen from the Contenders by the new Champions tribe. With the physical power shifting to the new Champions, Harry and Janine led opposing alliances which saw Harry's remaining allies picked off one by one while he saved himself with idols. Before the merge arrived, the two made a truce to blindside the last of the remaining Sporty Seven Champions in Simon, but an injury at the last tribal immunity challenge by Ross saw Tribal Council cancelled for the Contenders.

Ross's evacuation saw the Champions and Contenders on equal level entering the merge, but the Contenders lost their numbers when the merged tribe, Soli Bula, unanimously decided to take out Andy as an untrustworthy player, with Shaun following due to his status as a physical threat. The women in the Champions' alliance gathered the Contenders and Simon to blindside David and Luke, but a key immunity win by Luke saw the supermodel be sent to the jury instead of him. As the Contenders' numbers shrunk, Luke and Abbey started to stray from the Champions and aligned with the last two Contenders, Harry and Baden, to vote Simon to Exile Beach to defeat the last remaining Contender woman, Daisy. After Simon's return and subsequent permanent elimination, the new alliance turned on a perceived strategic powerhouse in Janine. With the bigger challenge threats eliminated, Luke began an immunity streak which also saw him finding an Send Back advantage, which allowed him to pick any player to send back to camp during Tribal before the vote. He used the advantage to send Baden back to camp in order to turn on Abbey over his closer ally, Pia. However, Luke's immunity run ended at the final four with the two Contenders and Pia sending him to the jury. With an Australian Survivor record-breaking final immunity challenge lasting over 6 hours and 40 minutes, Baden surprised the jury with an immunity win and sent the wily Harry to the jury instead of Pia.

The final two, Baden and Pia, were both criticized for their subtle social game by the jury. However, Pia managed to point out her contributions to the numerous decisions made by the Champions' alliance post swap and kidnapping until the merge, which saw louder power players systematically voted out. Baden struggled to assert his agency in his game, rather than the game being played past him. With a unanimous decision of 9 votes by the jury, Pia's social and strategic game was awarded at the end of the final Tribal Council in Fiji with the grand prize and the title of Sole Survivor.

Challenge winners and eliminations by episode

Tribal phase (Day 1-28)
Episode		Challenge winner(s)		Eliminated	Finish
No.	Air date	Reward	Immunity	Eliminated	Finish
1	24 July 2019	Champions	Contenders	Anastasia	1st voted out Day 2
2	25 July 2019	Champions	Champions	Laura	2nd voted out Day 5
3	28 July 2019	Contenders	Contenders	Susie	3rd voted out Day 7
4	29 July 2019	Champions	Contenders	Nova	4th voted out Day 10
4	29 July 2019	[John] (Note: The Champions were told to invite a castaway from the Contenders on their reward; they chose John.)	Contenders	Nova	4th voted out Day 10
5	30 July 2019	Champions	Contenders	Steven	5th voted out Day 12
6	4 August 2019	Champions	Contenders	E.T.	6th voted out Day 14
6	4 August 2019	[Baden, Shaun] (Note: The Champions were told to invite a castaway from the Contenders on their reward; they chose Baden. Baden was then told to bring another Contender on reward; he chose Shaun.)	Contenders	E.T.	6th voted out Day 14
7	5 August 2019	None (Note: No Reward Challenge, due to Tribe Swap.)	Contenders	Sam	7th voted out Day 16
8	6 August 2019	Contenders	Contenders	Sarah	8th voted out Day 18
9	11 August 2019	Champions	Champions	No elimination on Day 20 due to Kidnap vote. (Note: Instead of the Contenders tribe voting out a castaway, the Champions tribe voted for a Contender to kidnap — bringing them over to their tribe. Shaun was 'stolen' by the Champions tribe and become part of their tribe.)	
10	12 August 2019	None	Contenders	Hannah	9th voted out Day 22
11	13 August 2019	Champions	Champions	Casey	10th voted out Day 24
12	18 August 2019	Champions	Champions	Matt	11th voted out Day 26
12	18 August 2019	[Harry] (Note: The Champions were told to invite a castaway from the Contenders on their reward; they chose Harry.)	Champions	Matt	11th voted out Day 26
13	19 August 2019	None	Champions	Ross (Note: Ross was evacuated due to a broken ankle sustained during the Immunity Challenge. The Immunity Challenge continued while Ross’ injuries could be diagnosed by the medical team. Later in the day, both tribes were informed of Ross’ injuries and that he was not deemed fit to continue. Because of Ross’ evacuation, the planned Contenders’ Tribal Council was canceled.)	Medically evacuated Day 28

Individual phase (Day 29–50)
Episode		Challenge winner(s)		Eliminated	Finish
No.	Air date	Reward	Immunity	Eliminated	Finish
14	20 August 2019	Daisy	Shaun	Andy	12th voted out Day 30
15	25 August 2019	Abbey [David, John]	David	Shaun	13th voted out 1st jury member Day 32
16	26 August 2019	None (Note: In place of a reward challenge, a Dilemma occurred. Simon (as elected by the tribe) was given a pizza with 10 slices of varying sizes and had to assign the slices to everyone in the tribe - this dilemma went unaired in the episode, but was available as an extra on 10play.)	Luke	David	14th voted out 2nd jury member Day 34
17	27 August 2019	Abbey, Janine, Harry (Note: The Challenge was contested in pairs. Harry did not have a partner and therefore did not compete. As Harry had correctly guessed the winning team, he joined them on the reward.) [Simon]	Simon	John	15th voted out 3rd jury member Day 36
18	1 September 2019	Janine, Simon, [Daisy, Pia]	Janine	Daisy	16th voted out Exiled (Note: On Days 38 and 40, the Soli Bula tribe voted to exile a tribemate. On Day 41 the two exiled castaways competed in a duel, with the winner returning to the tribe and the loser being officially eliminated form the game. Daisy and Simon were exiled. Simon won the duel, officially eliminating Daisy.); Day 38
19	2 September 2019	None	Pia	Simon	17th voted out Exiled; Day 40
20	3 September 2019	None (Note: No Reward Challenge, due to Exile Duel.)	Luke	Daisy	Lost Exile Duel; 4th jury member Day 41
20	3 September 2019	None	Luke	Simon	18th voted out 5th jury member Day 42
21	9 September 2019	None	Luke	Janine	19th voted out 6th jury member Day 44
22	10 September 2019	None	Luke	Abbey	20th voted out 7th jury member Day 46
23	16 September 2019	None (Note: No Reward Challenge was held. Instead, the Final 4 participated in a questionnaire activity, which resulted in Luke and Baden receiving Burgers.)	Harry	Luke	21st voted out 8th jury member Day 47
24	17 September 2019	None	Baden	Harry	22nd voted out 9th jury member Day 49
24	17 September 2019			Final vote	
24	17 September 2019			Baden	Runner-up; Day 50
24	17 September 2019			Pia	Sole Survivor; Day 50

In the case of multiple tribes or castaways who win reward or immunity, they are listed in order of finish, or alphabetically where it was a team effort; where one castaway won and invited others, the invitees are in brackets.

== Episodes ==
No. overall	No. in season	Title	Timeline	Original release date
103	1	"Episode 1"	Days 1—2	24 July 2019
Just as the previous season, the 12 champions of their field and 12 everyday Australians arrived on the island. There, they battled in their first challenge for tribal necessities.: Reward challenge: One castaway from each tribe will race towards a sandbag and bring it back to their team; the winner scores a point. The first tribe to score three points would win a survival start-up kit, which includes fruits, vegetables, rope, firewood and a flint. The Champions won.; At the Champions camp, Steven made alliances with his fellow athletes on the tribe, calling themselves the "Sporty Seven". This included E.T., Simon, Ross, Susie, Abbey, and Nova. However, Luke started catching onto the fact that the athletes were starting to band together. Luke bonded with David, seeing him as a friend like Jericho from his last season, and the former approached Pia, Anastasia, and Janine for alliances. At the Contenders camp, while everyone is introducing themselves, Andy lies and tells everyone he is a freelance writer when he is actually an entrepreneur and poker player. Andy hopes to play the most dominant game, to date, and has been practicing various challenge skills in his backyard to prepare. On the first night, the Contenders' shelter ends up collapsing on them and they end up getting sick the next morning after eating the beans that they soaked in water overnight.: Immunity challenge: Both tribes will race through a series of walls and a giant A-frame. At the end of the A-frame, the tribes will push a heavy deck though their track; at the end of the track, they will foot the deck up to create a ramp to climb over a tower. Once every tribe member is on the tower, the tribe will get down to the other side and pull up a heavy frame with five tiles. Two members of each tribe will throw war clubs though the tiles. The first tribe to break all tiles will win immunity.; At the immunity challenge, the Champions were leading, but the Contenders pulled off an upset to win immunity. With Tribal Council looming, the Sporty Seven targeted Pia to keep the tribe stronger. Steven was concerned about being seen as the leader of the group and hoped to label E.T. as a false leader to keep himself safe. Luke's group wanted to target Susie as they perceived her as weakest, but Nova eavesdropped on their conversation. Nova was put off by how Anastasia was campaigning to her, leading Nova to believe that Anastasia might be a huge threat down the road and should leave first. Nova told Susie that her name was being thrown around and both attempted to convince the rest of the Sporty Seven to vote out Anastasia. E.T. had doubts because of how well Anastasia performed in the first challenge. Nova told Luke that she wanted Anastasia out, but Luke ended up revealing this information to Anastasia. In order to keep the tribe and their alliance stronger, Luke and David were willing to vote out Pia first to keep Anastasia in the game as they knew the Sporty Seven was unbreakable and they didn't have the numbers. Pia realized that her allies would rather keep Anastasia over her and began to campaign within the Sporty Seven to convince them to keep her instead. At Tribal Council, both Anastasia and Pia acknowledged that they were on the chopping block. Pia hoped that her positive attitude would make people want to keep her while Anastasia referred to her good performances in the challenges as the reason why she should stay. When the votes were read, the Sporty Seven agreed to go along with Nova's plan to eliminate Anastasia. Anastasia becomes the first person voted out of Australian Survivor.
104	2	"Episode 2"	Days 3—5	25 July 2019
At the Champions camp, Pia believes her acting skills helped her survive the vote. Susie is hoping that her Sporty Seven alliance will continue to stay strong moving forward. However, Luke has intentions on trying to break up the alliance. Luke creates another "Spy Shack" (a tactic also used by Tony of Survivor US: Cagayan) and speaks with David about their plans moving forward. David knows that they need to flip two people from the Sporty Seven and he plans on using his charm and looks to flip Abbey and Ross to their side.: Reward challenge: One pair from each tribe will face off, pushing against each other on a giant turnstile. First pair to cross the finish line will score a point for their tribe. The first tribe to score three points will win a tarp, a fishing kit and materials to build their own raft that will be waiting on their camp.; After a close battle, Abbey and Janine scored the third point, winning the challenge for the Champions. Having played before, Luke surmised there would likely be a clue hidden among the reward items. When night falls, Luke searches the raft the tribe won and finds an idol clue inside. The clue reveals the idol is buried underground.: Immunity challenge: Each castaway from each tribe will slide into a mud pit. Once all the tribe members are across the mud pit, four tribe members will climb over two big walls and push them down to create a clear path. Then, the whole tribe will drag a box full of puzzle pieces through the path; at the end of the path, the'll have to create a giant puzzle from the box to win immunity.; As the area was muddy, both tribes struggled to drag the box across the path. The Champions were the first to successfully do so, and Ross and Steven completed the puzzle to win immunity for the Champions. At Contenders, Baden is extremely worried that he'll be voted out because he isn't physically strong and he doesn't feel like he's fitting in socially with his tribe. There is a consensus among the tribe that Baden should be first out, with Matt being the strongest advocate. However, Andy and Harry believe that Laura is more of a threat moving forward than Baden. Laura had previously been upset to have been sat out of the Reward Challenge, so Laura began working on her social and strategic game by talking with everyone because she felt her being sat out meant the tribe viewed her as weak. Harry had noticed Laura talking and believed that she was playing the game hard. Harry begins to approach everyone to try and flip the vote towards Laura. Matt is not happy that people are suggesting Laura because he believes Laura has been underestimated and can contribute more than Baden. Laura can tell that Harry has been talking with everyone, except her, and asks who Baden is supposed to be voting for. Harry says that they told Baden to vote for Sarah, which doesn't make a lot of sense to Laura. Laura begins to feel like people are targeting her so she begins to reaffirm some relationships to keep herself safe. At Tribal Council, the tribe discusses keeping themselves strong and Matt specifically states that some people have not contributed equally in the strength in the challenges. Both Laura and Baden state that they are on the chopping block. Baden gives an impassioned speech to plead his case and believes he will be valuable to the tribe in future challenges. When the votes are cast, Andy and Harry have both interestingly voted for Baden along with Daisy and Laura, but their plan to have Laura voted out works as the remaining eight players vote for Laura. Laura becomes the second person voted out of Australian Survivor.
105	3	"Episode 3"	Days 6—7	28 July 2019
At the Champions camp, Luke, David, Janine, and Pia continue to look for cracks in the Sporty Seven alliance. They believe they might have found one when Nova instructs her tribemates to only eat one banana per day, which doesn't make Ross very happy. Luke observes that Ross is a free spirit, he doesn't really take well to being told what to do, and he believes that he can use this to get Ross to flip to his side.: Reward challenge: One castaway from each tribe will face off on a trench, where they'll race towards a bell at the opposite end, while the opponent will block the other castaway. First castaway to ring the rival's bell will score a point. The first tribe to score five points will win a crate of mystery items.; Shaun scored the fifth point to win the crate for the Contenders. Back at camp, the Contenders find out that they must select one of their tribe members to divide up the reward items among the tribe. The tribe chooses John. Andy observes the items being handed out and deduces that Shaun, Daisy, Matt, and John are running the camp; Baden, Hannah, and Sarah are on the bottom, while he, Sam, Casey, and Harry were in the middle. At the Champions camp, Luke and David find the idol from the clue Luke had and Luke takes possession of the idol.: Immunity challenge: Both tribes will race through a log that they'll have to dig under. When all the tribe mates crossed the log, they'll carry a heavy plank through a series of obstacles. They'll use the plank as a seesaw to collect sand bags. Once all sand bags are collected, five castaways will hold on a pole, while two tribe mates will try to land the sandbags on the top of the pole. The first tribe to land sandbags on all five poles will win immunity.; Andy and Hannah landed all the sandbags to win immunity for the Contenders. Several of the Champions blamed Janine for the loss since she suggested that the tribe dig a longways trench under the log instead of a deep trench and the tribe followed her instructions. Steven, Nova, and Susie believe that Janine should own up to her mistake and be voted out. However, Abbey is not in agreement with the rest of the Sporty Seven and believes that Janine will be beneficial to the Champions. Abbey expresses concern that she doesn't have a voice in the decision making in the Sporty Seven and she is instead being told what to do. David and Janine pitch to Abbey that Susie is the weakest tribe member and should be voted out. David tells Abbey that she can use this opportunity to send a message to the Sporty Seven to take her more seriously. Meanwhile, Luke also attempts to convince Ross to join their alliance to vote out Susie. Both Abbey and Ross are on the fence about the vote and are not sure which way to go. At Tribal Council, the tribe talks about relationships that have been built and keeping the tribe strong. Susie hopes that the trust she has built already in the game will come through for her tonight. Janine takes the opportunity to plea to everyone to think about the strength in the tribe and not to just follow along with a plan. Janine argues that voting her out is not the smartest move and hopes if anyone is on the fence, they consider that when they vote. When the votes are cast, Abbey and Ross decide to flip and cast their votes for Susie, making the vote 6-5. Susie becomes the third person voted out of Australian Survivor.
106	4	"Episode 4"	Days 8—10	29 July 2019
At the Champions, Luke celebrates his victory of splitting up the Sporty Seven and having his alliance bring Ross and Abbey over to their side. Abbey and Ross are both feeling the heat from flipping as Steven and Nova have been very bitter towards them. Steven is feeling extremely vulnerable as he organized this alliance and he thinks he's next to go.: Reward challenge: One by one, castaways from each tribe ran out and jump from a tower in an attempt to grab a flag. Once they have their flag, they will swim to a platform, and put the flag into a holder. Once all ten flags have been collected, they'll dive down to retrieve a set of buoys. Once they have all of their buoys, they will use them to solve a word puzzle. The first tribe to finish their puzzle wins hot chocolate and marshmallows.; At the challenge, Sarah, remembering her experience surviving the Boxing Day Tsunami, froze before leaping in the water. The Champions ultimately won reward; Jonathan told them to pick a Contender to join them, and they selected John. Janine searched the reward items for an advantage and found a clue to an idol. David sees her take the clue, but doesn't say anything. Janine does find the idol, but it is an idol with limited powers: Janine has found an idol that only has power if a Contender takes possession of it and plays it. The parchment states that another idol is hidden at the Contenders beach which can only be played by a Champion. Janine knows that she'll have to try and figure out if there's anyone on the Contenders she can trust in order to give them the idol and hopefully build some trust.: Immunity challenge: Eight castaways from each tribe will be tethered to a rope wrapped around several obstacles. Two at a time, they will go through the course. The last pair to finish the course will have a key, used to unlock a gate and release four balls. The last two members of the tribe will use the balls to toss up a vertical ramp and get them in a bucket. The first tribe to get all four balls in their bucket wins immunity. (Contenders win); At the Champions, Luke and Pia feel responsible for the tribe's loss. Simon takes an opportunity to talk to Abbey to see if she would rejoin the Sporty Seven. Abbey states that she cannot because she feels Steven and Nova did nothing to make her feel welcome and she cannot work with them. Abbey does talk with Steven and Nova about why she flipped on the Sporty Seven, but Steven cannot accept her explanation and states that Abbey was weak, she lied, and he doesn't appreciate her deceptive gameplay. Abbey is very upset by this conversation and is moved to tears, which prompts David to confront Steven over his behavior. Several people are mad because Steven called Abbey weak. Steven claims that he didn't say Abbey was weak, but rather he stated that her gameplay was weak. Nova comes to Steven's defense stating that Steven did not get confrontational or personal. Nova states that Abbey was called out for her actions, she couldn't handle the pressure, and she accuses Abbey of fake crying. While Steven does apologize to Abbey for how he made her feel, he knows that he's in a position where he will likely be next to go. At Tribal Council, the tribe discusses the tension that arose at camp between Steven and Abbey. Members of Abbey's alliance accuse Steven of launching a personal attack against Abbey while Steven and Nova dispute that and state that Steven never called Abbey weak and was just confronting her about her game. The tribe states that it is feeling a lot of pressure because they've lost three out of the four immunity challenges. When the votes take place, the majority alliance actually decides to vote Nova out to keep the tribe strong and for her defending Steven. Nova becomes the fourth person voted out of Australian Survivor.
107	5	"Episode 5"	Days 11—12	30 July 2019
At Contenders, Shaun and Daisy have made a tight alliance. During a trip to the well, Shaun discovers an idol with Daisy that turns out to be the idol with special rules that Janine found last episode. Shaun knows he has to give it to a Champion in order for it to have any power. Shaun is hoping that he can use this idol to establish tight relationships on the other tribe for the merge. At Champions, Steven is surprised to still be in the game and is trying to work on his social game to get back in the good graces of the tribe. However, David states that Steven has no clue how to play the game and he'll surely be out next. David is liking his position in the game with his alliances, his knowledge of Luke and Janine's idol, but he wants an idol of his own. Janine does finally tell David about her idol in order to gain his trust. David believes he might be able to use this knowledge to his advantage.: Reward challenge: Three members from each tribe must race through the water to get control of the ball. They will then pass the ball onto a fourth member on a platform, who will kick it in. The first tribe to kick five goals wins fish and chips. (Champions win); At the reward challenge, David and Shaun reveal their knowledge of the special idols and agree to swap them at the next immunity challenge. When David asks Janine if he can have the idol, Janine states that she wants to keep it for the merge. However, David wants to get a hold of Shaun's idol so he creates a fake idol to discreetly swap with Shaun's real one.: Immunity challenge: Five members of each tribe will be locked in a series of cages throughout an obstacle course. Two more members of the tribe will run the course, freeing their tribemates along the way. Once everyone is free, all members of the tribe will go under a net and collect a set of sandbags. The final two members will use a set of blocks to create the Australian Survivor logo. Once that is finished, they will use the sandbags to knock down the blocks. The first tribe to knock down all of their blocks wins immunity. (Contenders win); During the immunity challenge, David and Shaun swap idols but Shaun is not aware he got a fake one while David does get the real idol. Back at camp, the majority alliance decides to split their votes between E.T. and Steven in case Steven has an idol. In order to prevent a possible blindside, David tells E.T. and Simon to vote Steven out tonight in order to save themselves. The tribe feels David was a little too arrogant and bossy with his pitch and his alliance wonders if the power is going to David's head. E.T. and Simon don't appreciate the way David spoke to them and believe that the majority alliance is splitting the vote. Steven, E.T., and Simon attempt to convince Ross to join back with them to blindside Pia in order to keep the tribe strong and upset the majority alliance. Pia observes Simon talking to Ross and tells her alliance that they should just all vote for Steven instead of splitting the vote. The alliance is concerned whether Ross will stay loyal to them or will flip back. At Tribal Council, there is whispering among the majority alliance about whether to split the vote or just vote Steven and whether they can trust Ross. At once point, Ross actually states that he deserves to go home for his poor performance. However, the tribe observes that the vote is not about challenge performance, but about numbers and alliances. Steven states that he is still vulnerable and David states that Steven put himself in that position with the way he played the game. Pia also admits that she is in danger and worries about the vote going awry because of various plans. However, when the votes are cast, the tribe unanimously votes for Steven. Steven becomes the fifth person voted out of Australian Survivor.
108	6	"Episode 6"	Days 13—14	4 August 2019
At the Contenders, the tribe is enjoying their life of not going to Tribal Council and are bonding better as a team. At the Champions, E.T. and Simon know that they are on the bottom of the tribe and perceive David to be running the camp. E.T. approaches Luke and Ross to convince them to join in an alliance with him and Simon to keep the tribe strong moving forward. Meanwhile, Janine, Pia, and Abbey have formed a tight girls alliance.: Reward challenge: Members of each tribe will face off in a tug-o-war in an attempt to smash a pole into a wooden board to score a point. The first two rounds are three-on-three, the next two are four-on-four, and the final round is one-on-one. The first tribe to score 3 points wins burgers and ice-cold beer. (Champions win); Despite being down in numbers, the Champions continued their dominance in reward challenges, selecting Baden to join them on reward. Baden then chose Shaun to also accompany them. David is not thrilled that Shaun is visiting and worries he'll discover the idol is fake. While eating, David and Shaun talk about their idols. David lies to Shaun and tells him that he had to play his idol for Pia at the last Tribal Council because Steven tried to take her out. Abbey notices Shaun and David whispering frequently and she worries that David might be trying to make plans with the other tribe.: Immunity challenge: Two members of each tribe will stand on a narrow beam atop a tower. Two of the remaining six members will hold a pair of rope in order to keep a sandbag within a painted area. If the sandbag goes below the painted area, the castaway on the beam will fall into the water. Three castaways are assigned to one rope, and are able to switch out at any time, but only once. The last castaway standing on their beam wins immunity for their tribe. (Contenders win); During the challenge, Casey asks Pia and Simon if David really played an idol for Pia and the two relate back that they are confused about the story. Back at camp, David candidly tells E.T. that he is leaving next. David believes that the vote will be a simple split between E.T. and Simon. E.T. tries to convince Abbey to come back into an alliance with him and keep him around. Abbey is in a true dilemma as she trusts and likes both E.T. and Simon. After David talks with Abbey about blindsiding Pia at the very next Tribal Council, Abbey discusses with Janine and Pia the possibility of blindsiding David tonight as they believe his ego is out of control and that he is playing too hard of a game. At Tribal Council, E.T. and Simon discuss why their tribe should keep them in the game. Abbey relates to the tribe that this vote is very difficult for her while David states that the vote is very simple and essentially tells everyone in his alliance that they should do what they were told. Despite the earlier discussions, the majority alliance stays strong and cast more votes against E.T.. E.T. becomes the sixth person voted out of Australian Survivor.
109	7	"Episode 7"	Days 15—16	5 August 2019
At Contenders, Shaun is concerned about the strong strategic games Andy and Harry are playing and he wants to keep them on his side so they don't blindside him. Shaun shares with Andy that he and David swapped idols and both possess idols. Andy is happy to learn about the idol, but reveals in private that Shaun was foolish to reveal this to him and he plans to use it against Shaun when the time is right. On the morning of Day 15, a tribe swap occurs. The new tribes are as follows: New Champions: Andy, Baden, Daisy, David, Hannah, John, Luke, Sam, and Sarah New Contenders: Abbey, Casey, Harry, Janine, Matt, Pia, Ross, Shaun, and Simon At New Contenders, Simon believes that he finally has new life in the game. Janine is happy that on this tribe there are five Champions versus four Contenders so they have the numbers. Harry is very concerned that he is now on the bottom of the new Contenders tribe. While the tribe introduces themselves, Harry finds that the Champions are all very family oriented so he lies to the tribe and tells them he has a three-year-old son named Oscar. Harry doesn't have children, but he is hoping that the lie will coerce people into liking him and allow him to infiltrate the Champions alliance.: Immunity challenge: Four pairs of two on each tribe will assume a squatting position while attempting to balance a bar on their shoulders together. If the bar moves enough, it will knock over a stack of blocks, eliminating the pair from the challenge. The last pair standing wins immunity for their tribe. (Contenders win); During the challenge, it comes down to Daisy/Sam versus Janine/Abbey. Luke actually asks Janine and Abbey in front of everyone to throw the challenge. Nobody responds to Luke's plea and Contenders go on to win. At New Champions, Luke and David realize that they are completely outnumbered as they are the only two Champions on this tribe against seven Contenders. Andy knows that David has an idol, so he plans to split the votes between Luke and David to ensure one of them leaves. Andy proposes that the deciding vote should be based on a coin flip so Luke and David don't know which one is leaving. Luke and David begin to pull people aside to see if there are any cracks in the Contenders. Both Baden and Sam shoot them down, stating that the Contenders are strong. Luke and David both have idols and decide that they are going to double down and play both of their idols to ensure a Contender leaves. David proposes getting rid of Sam because he didn't like the way she spoke to him during their talk. Luke and David pulling everyone aside begins to worry Andy. Andy informs the Contenders, minus Daisy, that David has an idol and reveals that Shaun told him about the idol swap. Daisy was not present for this conversation, but overhears Andy talking once she gets back to camp. Daisy is furious that Andy would reveal Shaun's idol to the group when Shaun shared that to Andy in private. Daisy talks privately with John and tells him that she isn't interested in moving forward Contender strong anymore. Daisy doesn't trust Andy and believes he's gotten too much power in this game. Daisy proposes to John that they join with Luke and David to vote out Sam tonight because they need Andy for the challenges, but taking out Sam will weaken Andy's control on the tribe. However, they know they will need five votes for a majority. David and Luke easily agree to this plan. Daisy and John then approach Baden to see if he will join with them. Baden is unsure of how to vote because he believes Luke and David are a huge power duo in the game, but Baden also wants to establish his position in the game and this could do it. At Tribal Council, Luke and David discuss their precarious positions on the tribe. The tribe also discusses whether tonight is the right time to make a move or not. Several Contenders believe that tonight is not the right time to make a move, but Daisy states that she is going to be voting for whatever is best for her game. When the votes are cast, Baden decides to flip on the Contenders along with Daisy and John as Sam is blindsided with five votes. Sam becomes the seventh person voted out of Australian Survivor.
110	8	"Episode 8"	Days 17—18	6 August 2019
At Champions, David is thrilled that he was able to turn the Contenders against each other and he feels powerful in his position. Andy is feeling very shaken by the last vote and tries to align with David to see if he can improve his position in the game. However, David doesn't really want to align with Andy as he believes Andy is too good of a player to keep around. Sarah is also upset that the Contenders have suddenly flipped on each other and is particularly mad at Daisy for ruining the Contenders alliance. Sarah and Hannah hope to blindside Daisy at the next Tribal Council and discuss getting Andy and Baden to come onboard with their plan. At Contenders, the former Champions are determined to stick together and get rid of the other Contenders on the tribe. However, Harry is hoping to take down the Champions and plans to look for an idol to help give the Contenders a better advantage. Harry is convinced that either David or Luke went home last night and is sure that the Contenders are going strong on the new Champions tribe.: Reward challenge: One person from each tribe will attempt to fight a strong current and keeping within a marked area. The last person in the marked area earns a point for their tribe. The first tribe to 3 points wins pastries and coffee at a Survivor café. (Contenders win); At the reward site, Harry is stunned that Sam went home and believes that Daisy flipped on the Contenders. Harry knows now that he can only rely on himself to try and improve his situation on the new Contenders tribe. Harry attempts to build a bond with Janine as he sees her as the leader of the Champions alliance. Harry is concerned that either himself or Casey will be voted out if the Contenders lose since Matt and Shaun are good competitors. In order to improve her situation, Casey begins to play both sides and tries to get close with Janine, Pia, and Abbey. Later that day, Harry is able to find the idol in the woods and hopes to use it to blindside Janine.: Immunity challenge: Two members of each tribe will lie in a chamber. The remaining six members of the tribe will race to get a bucket of water from the ocean, then cross a balance beam. From there, they will pour it into a barrel with a pipe, filling the chamber. Once there is enough water in the chamber, it will become more confined and difficult to get air, pressuring them to drop out. The last person standing wins for their tribe. (Contenders win); Back at camp, Andy again proposes to David that they join forces in the game. David gathers up the majority alliance, including Andy, and proposes that they vote Sarah out tonight as he perceives her as the weakest member of the tribe. The alliance comes to a consensus that Sarah should go. Later, Sarah approaches Andy and Hannah with a plan to blindside Daisy to take back control of the Contenders. However, Sarah later observes Andy speaking with Daisy in the shelter and overhears Andy tell Daisy about Sarah's plan to blindside Daisy. Sarah is furious at Andy and now knows that Andy will do whatever it takes to keep himself safe and he needs to go. Sarah tells Luke, Baden, Hannah, and David about Andy spilling the beans to Daisy. David proposes to the group that they should instead vote Andy out because he's been playing the game hard and is having a tough time keeping his lies straight. Sarah is confident that she can turn the tide against Andy tonight. At Tribal Council, the tribe discusses how Sam's blindside had a huge impact on the tribe. Sarah states that the lines and loyalties have blurred between the Champions and Contenders on this tribe. Daisy remarks that the loyalty may not have been there to begin with. The tribe also brings up the situation between Andy and Sarah where Andy was caught talking to Daisy. Sarah states that Andy proved today that he cannot be trusted. However, Andy is hoping that what he has done today will show that trust has been rebuilt and the tribe can move forward. When the votes are cast, Hannah and Sarah voted for Andy, but the remainder of the tribe banded together to get rid of Sarah. Sarah becomes the eighth person voted out of Australian Survivor.
111	9	"Episode 9"	Day 19—20	11 August 2019
At the Contenders camp, Shaun has not yet had an opportunity to look at the hidden immunity idol David gave him a few episodes ago. Shaun finally does take a look at it and realizes that it is not the same idol that he gave to David. Shaun is convinced that David has given him a fake idol and he is furious. Shaun shares this with the tribe and Janine confirms that the idol Shaun received is fake. Janine, Pia, and Abbey realize that David is playing an intense game and they know they need to get him out. Shaun is determined to make sure that he votes David out the first chance he gets.: Reward challenge: In one-on-one match-ups, each castaway is tethered to an idol. They must knock down their opponent's idol first to score a point for their tribe. The first tribe to 5 points wins a toasted sandwich making kit and souvenir plates with messages from their loved ones.; The Champions won reward. After the win, Shaun gives Daisy a hug and informs her that David gave him a fake idol and asks her to get rid of David for him. Back at camp, Daisy lets Baden know about David giving Shaun the fake idol.: Immunity challenge: One tribe member will chop through a log to release a set of blocks from an arch. The remaining six members will balance the blocks on a disk across a pair of balance beams and a bamboo curtain. Once all the blocks from the first set are across the bamboo curtain, two members will then untie a set of poles, then use them to get a second set of blocks from an overhead net. Once the tribe has all of their blocks, they must stack them. The first tribe to finish their stack of blocks that can stay up for 3 seconds wins immunity.; The Champions finally ended their losing streak in immunity challenges and won immunity. After the challenge, Harry whispers to Daisy that if he is voted out tonight then she should be aware that Shaun is next. Jonathan then informs the tribes that the Champions will attend the Contenders' Tribal Council tonight. Back at Contenders, Janine is confident that her alliance of five will stick together and this will be a perfect opportunity to eliminate some Contenders to better their position in the merge. The Champions all meet and agree to get rid of Harry tonight. However, Harry has the idol and he is determined to use his idol to get rid of Janine as he believes she is the leader of the Champions Alliance. Harry hopes to create paranoia in the Champions by sending Casey to spread rumors that Harry has an idol. Casey does talk with the girls and reveals that Harry absolutely has an idol. However, this makes Janine believe that Casey is playing both sides and is not to be trusted. The Champions note that Casey is relaying information back and forth. The Champions agree that they should maintain the idea that it is going to be Harry, but instead vote for Casey to flush Harry's idol and get rid of a threat. Going into Tribal Council, Harry knows that the Champions might vote out a different Contender to make sure the idol doesn't affect them. Harry decides that he's going to draw attention to himself at Tribal Council by calling people out to make the Champions all vote for him and then he can use the idol to get rid of Janine. At Tribal Council, Janine acknowledges that the Champions were blessed during the swap. Casey states that she feels vulnerable because Ross has told her that he cannot trust her. Harry goes on the offense and states that only six people in this game are really playing to win and everyone else is cruising. Harry accuses the Champions of following Janine and not really playing the game. Harry then drops the biggest bombshell when he reveals that he lied about having a son. It is during this Tribal Council that Harry earns his nickname, "Dirty Harry", and Janine is dubbed by Harry as the Godmother. Despite the big build up to the vote, Jonathan reveals that tonight's vote is going to be different. Jonathan reveals that nobody is leaving the game tonight. Instead, the Champions are going to be voting for someone on the Contenders that they would like to kidnap and have join the Champions tribe. When the votes are revealed, the majority has chosen Shaun to join the Champions. Shaun joins the Champions tribe and nobody leaves the game on this night.
112	10	"Episode 10"	Day 21—22	12 August 2019
At Champions, Shaun is happy to have joined the Champions tribe and reuniting with his allies Daisy and John. Shaun shares with them that the Champions on the Contenders tribe were unbreakable which leads Daisy and John to conclude that the Contenders here need to stick together and get rid of David and Luke. Shaun is also looking to get revenge on David for giving him the fake idol. David and Luke are beginning to realize that with Shaun joining the tribe, he has been able to rally the Contenders and the two of them are no longer able to control the vote. David does talk with Shaun in the hopes of solidifying their alliance and David is still convinced that Shaun has no clue the idol is fake. At Contenders, the tribe is still dealing from the fallout of losing Shaun and the drama at Tribal. Janine is worried about Harry painting a target on her and showing his true colors. Harry is also feeling upset because he acted up at Tribal so that he could draw the votes and play his idol, but the twist ruined his plans. Harry knows that he's put himself in a bad position with his behavior and wonders how he will be able to survive.: Immunity challenge: Two at a time, castaways will go through an obstacle course, collecting a pair of balls. Once they've collected their balls, they'll go to the top of a tower, where one member of the tribe will dive underwater to pull on a rope, opening a goal. The first tribe to get all eight balls into a goal wins immunity.; During the Challenge, the Contenders fell behind at the beginning. However, at the second half, Simon's accuracy and Ross's remarkable ability to hold his breath allowed the Contenders to come back and win immunity. Back at Champions, the former Contenders agree to split their votes between Luke and David. The group is aware that David has an idol, so they attempt to paint Hannah as the fake target because she came back from the challenge feeling sick. Because Daisy had prior connections with Luke and David, she tells them that the plan is to unanimously vote out Hannah to keep the tribe strong. The Contenders tell Hannah to play up the fact she is sick and to act like she is worried about being voted out. David and Luke believe that the plan is to truly get rid of Hannah and feel pretty safe about not playing their idols. However, Andy begins to believe that getting rid of David is not the best move for him as he wants to work with David and is tired of Shaun and Daisy being in control. Shortly before Tribal, Andy approaches David and Luke to tell them that the Contenders lied to them, the plan is to split the votes against the two. Andy proposes that the two of them join him and vote out Daisy to break up her and Shaun's strong alliance. After hearing this, David and Luke have no idea what to think because they still have reservations about whether they can trust Andy. At Tribal Council, the tribe discusses how Shaun's addition has been good for the tribe and Hannah shares that she is feeling vulnerable and on the bottom of the tribe. The tribe seems to indicate that what Hannah has said is true. As Hannah speaks, David whispers to Luke that he doesn't think Hannah is telling the truth and that they need to play their idols tonight. Luke agrees, but the two debate whether or not they should vote for Daisy like Andy proposed. The tribe notices Luke and David whispering. David states that he thought the tribe was united in the vote, but it is clear something different is happening and he pulls out his idol to reveal it to everyone. As the tribe scrambles to figure out what to do, David proposes to Luke that they vote for Shaun because he thinks the six Contenders will vote for both of them and then their votes will be the only ones that count. When the voting takes place, both David and Luke play their idols. Nobody voted for Luke, but David's idol negates three votes that were cast against him. Andy did indeed vote for Daisy, while David and Luke voted for Shaun. However, Baden and John have cast their votes for Hannah, resulting in a 2-2 tie between Shaun and Hannah. The tribe is told to vote again for either Hannah or Shaun. While David and Luke vote for Shaun again, the remaining Contenders decide that they need to keep Shaun and cast their votes for Hannah. Hannah becomes the ninth person voted out of Australian Survivor.
113	11	"Episode 11"	Day 23—24	13 August 2019
After Tribal, the former Contenders are still in shock that both David and Luke had idols. Andy is very upset that David and Luke didn't follow his plan. David and Luke begin to realize that they made a mistake voting for Shaun as Andy gave them a lifeline and they turned it down. Now, the two realize that the Contenders can easily vote them out if they lose again. The next morning, Shaun does reveal to David that he knows the idol is fake and makes it clear David is next to leave. David knows that he needs to find an idol to get some power back. At Contenders, the former Champions are still a strong unit with Matt, Casey, and Harry trying to figure out how to survive. While Matt relies on his strength and Harry relies on his idol, Casey is still attempting to convince Janine, Pia, and Abbey that she wants to work with them. However, Janine doesn't believe she can trust Casey because Casey has been playing both sides and sharing information back and forth.: Reward challenge: In one-on-one match-ups, castaways will race across a set of monkey bars to grab a flag. The first person to grab the flag earns a point for their tribe. If they fall into the water, they are out, but the person still on the monkey bars does not automatically earn a point. The first tribe to 3 wins a private viewing of their loved ones' videos from home at a Survivor cinema. (Champions win); After the reward challenge, David whispers to Simon that he had to play his idol and him and Luke are in trouble if they lose again. The Champions find out at the reward site that the movies will be a private viewing so the players will go in one at a time to watch the movies and they have to decide on an order. Surprisingly, the tribe agrees to let David go first, which they later realize was a mistake as these kinds of rewards have either an idol or a clue hidden. David is very much aware of this and is able to locate an idol in the large popcorn machine underneath the popcorn. Back at Contenders, the former Champions discuss throwing the next immunity challenge to get rid of a Contender and keep Luke and David safe on the other tribe. Casey overhears this conversation take place.: Immunity challenge: Three pairs of two will stand on a narrow perch while hold a gutter with a ball in it. The goal to try to keep the ball in the gutter. If the ball falls out of the gutter or fall off the beam, that pair is eliminated. At regular intervals, they will move down on a narrower beam. The last pair standing wins for their tribe. (Champions win); During the immunity challenge, Pia and Simon do fall off the balancing beam during the transition which is indicative that they threw the challenge. Back at Contenders, Casey tells Harry and Matt about the Champions' conversation to throw the challenge. Harry tells Matt and Casey that he will play his idol and they should vote for Abbey tonight. However, Casey believes it is in her best interest to join the Champions to save herself and tells Abbey and Janine about Harry's plan. However, the women don't believe that Harry actually has an idol. The Champions also doubt whether they can trust Casey because she plays both sides. To be safe, the Champions agree to split their votes between Harry and Casey that way if Harry plays his idol, Casey will leave. The Champions do approach Casey and Matt to tell them to vote for Harry to save themselves. Matt is on the fence because he knows he needs to watch out for his own interests, but he also wants a Contender to win the game. Harry notices the conversations going on around camp and does suspect that Matt and Casey might have turned on him. At Tribal, Harry continues to assert that Janine is the leader of the Champions while Janine states that Harry's game is just about putting the spotlight on other people. Harry does bring up the fact that the former Champions might have conspired to throw the challenge. Matt does confirm that he was told about this conversation. Initially, Casey claims that Harry told them this, but Matt and Harry both state that it was Casey who informed them the Champions told her they would throw the challenge so they could get rid of the Contenders. Casey denies doing this and Janine denies that any conversation about throwing the challenge took place with Casey. Harry warns that if the Contenders don't stick together, then they are going to get picked off by the Champions. After the votes, Harry does play his idol which negates four votes. It is revealed that Matt and Casey did join the Champions to vote out Harry. However, the Champions did follow through with splitting their votes and Casey received the other four votes. Casey becomes the tenth person voted out of Australian Survivor.
114	12	"Episode 12"	Day 25—26	18 August 2019
At Contenders, Harry and Matt acknowledge that if their tribe loses again one of them will be voted out. Harry has begun looking for an idol again while Ross tries to follow him. Harry is able to give him the slip and finds a clue by the watering well stating that the idol is above the shelter. Before the tribe leaves for the reward challenge, Harry is able to lean the tribe's flag up against the shelter and grabs the idol as the tribe leaves. At Champions, David and Luke still find themselves in a precarious position. David tells Luke he has found the idol, but David also wants to plan ahead for the future as the idol won't protect him for long. David attempts to make amends with Shaun, trying to convince him that the physical threats need to stay together after the merge or they will be picked off. Shaun cannot trust David, but believes that David has made some good points that make him think about the future.: Reward challenge: On one-on-one match-ups, castaways will be blindfolded and attempt to collect a ring at the end of a narrow beam on top of a tower. Once they have a ring, they will dive in the water and remove their blindfold and attempt to land the ring on a peg. The first person to get their ring on the peg earns a point for their tribe. The first tribe to 3 points wins a trip to a Survivor pub.; The Champions win the reward and are allowed to select one person from Contenders to join them. The Champions choose Harry with the hopes that he will give them information. Harry absolutely spills everything to the Champions tribe about what has been going on at Contenders and informs his former Contenders that the Champions are sticking together. While this is good news for Luke and David, tribe members Daisy, Shaun, and Andy consider throwing the next immunity challenge to vote out Luke or David to keep the Champions and Contenders numbers even.: Immunity challenge: One at a time, five castaways from each tribe will slide down a water slide and attempt to grab one of four number tiles. Once all four tiles are collected and all five members are down the slide, they will use the number tiles to unlock a combination lock, releasing a sledgehammer. Once they have the sledgehammer, they will use it to smash three wooden targets, releasing three sets of bags containing puzzle pieces. The final two tribe members will use the puzzle pieces to complete a puzzle. The first tribe to complete their puzzle wins.; During the challenge, it appears Andy might be throwing it as he does poorly on the puzzle. However, Baden is not in on the plan to throw the challenge and ends up winning it for the Champions. Back at Contenders, Matt expresses frustration over his position in the game and the tribe's consistent losses. The Champions decide to throw their votes towards Harry because they believe he doesn't have an idol. However, Harry and Matt are not giving up and both decide to approach Simon and Ross to see if they will join them in a men's alliance. Harry and Matt point out to Simon that he was on the bottom of the Champions before the switch and try to convince both Ross and Simon that Janine, Pia, and Abbey are in control and would vote them out if Harry and Matt weren't there. Ross does tell Harry that he would be interested to shake things up, but Harry can't tell if Ross is being serious. Harry decides to put on some tears to convince Ross to keep him in the game and Ross does seem to genuinely want to help Harry. While Janine sees Harry and Ross working hard on the men, she remains confident in her position. At Tribal, the tribe discusses the tension between Harry and Janine. Harry actually states that he wants to play against tough players and he has a lot of respect for Janine. Harry and Matt discuss their helpless positions in the game which Janine and Abbey pretty much confirm. Harry and Matt make one last pitch to Simon and Ross to flip and vote out Pia with them to break up Janine's strong alliance. When the votes are cast, Harry plays his idol, which negates three votes cast against him. Janine also decides to play her idol, but she receives no votes. Harry and Matt do vote for Pia, however, it is revealed the Champions did decide to split the vote between Harry and Matt. The vote ends up in a 2-2 tie between Pia and Matt. On the revote, the Champions remain solid and cast their votes for Matt. Matt becomes the eleventh person voted out of Australian Survivor.
115	13	"Episode 13"	Day 27—28	19 August 2019
On Contenders, Ross seems to be genuinely enjoying life on the island and found that Survivor is teaching him what is important in life. Ross states that his strategy for Survivor is like surfing: you be patient, wait for the best wave, and then go get it when the time is right. Harry is feeling somewhat victorious at surviving another Tribal and making Janine waste her idol. However, Harry wants to survive longer and actually approaches Janine with a pitch to work together in the game. Harry tells Janine that he has connections with the former Contenders that can help her in the game. Janine begins to seriously consider Harry's proposal as her strategy is to play the game like she does her business and she is weighing the pros and cons of Harry's arguments very seriously. At Champions, David and Luke are convinced that Andy tried to throw the immunity challenge yesterday, which Andy confirms in a confessional. Luke is appreciative that Baden did not join in on the plan to throw the challenge and he thinks that he can work with him moving forward. Luke states that the social game is the most important part of Survivor so he approaches Baden with the hope of making an alliance moving forward.: Immunity challenge: Castaways will race across a series of stepping poles and swing across on a rope swing. Then one person will toss a pair monkey's fist into a pair of fork to make a set safety lines for a pair of hanging balance beams. Two members will then unscrew a crate of ladder rungs. The tribes will then use the ladder rungs to complete a ladder to the top of a tower. The first tribe to get all of their castaways to the top of the tower and light their fire wins.; During the immunity challenge, a terrible accident occurs. While Ross is swinging across the rope to the other platform, the rope comes undone and Ross ends up hitting his legs onto the platform and falls to the ground. Ross screams in pain, believing he has broken his ankle. The medics come in to check him out and determine they need to take Ross out of the challenge to run more tests. The contestants resume the challenge without Ross and the Champions win immunity. Back at camp, the Contenders are devastated that Ross suffered an injury and they have to go to Tribal again. Pia also feels very embarrassed about her performance in the challenge, which she believes held her team back. The Champions come to a consensus that Harry could not have found another idol in such a short amount of time and plan to vote him out. However, Janine and Pia discuss Harry's proposal and believe that he might be worth keeping for the merge. Janine proposes to Pia that they switch up the vote and get rid of Simon as he was already on the bottom of the Champions and she doesn't think Simon can offer as much in the merge as Harry can. Pia appears onboard with the plan, but when they make the pitch to Abbey, she doesn't agree believing that they should stick to their word with Simon. Janine observes that Abbey sometimes plays the game with emotions and encourages her to make a strategic decision. Pia believes that voting Simon out would be a good move as Harry does have connections and Simon would be a physical threat at the merge. Janine and Pia inform Harry that he should vote for Simon tonight and Harry is thrilled that things have changed for him. Later that day, Ross and Jonathan return to the beach. Jonathan informs the contestants that Ross has fractured his ankle in the challenge and he must be evacuated from the game as a result. The tribe is very sad to hear this news. Jonathan informs the Contenders that with Ross leaving, there will be no Tribal Council and nobody else will leave. The Champions and the Contenders tribe both gather together to say goodbye to Ross. Everyone is in agreement that Ross has been a morale boost for the entire camp and everyone has truly grown to love his presence and company. Ross becomes the twelfth person to be eliminated from Australian Survivor.
116	14	"Episode 14"	Day 29—30	20 August 2019
On Day 29, the Champions and Contenders tribes merge into one. Everyone celebrates the achievements that they've made in the game and are looking forward to the next stage of the game. The contestants immediately compete in their first reward challenge.: Reward challenge: Castaways will stand holding a sandbag tethered to a bucket of water above their head. During the challenge, castaways will be offered various temptations including food items, a call home and game advantages, which they may eliminate themselves to receive. The last person left standing wins a mystery crate which will provide them with exactly what they need "to start the next phase of the game".; During the Challenge, Pia and Harry drop out for a phone call home and everyone else except for Daisy, David, and Simon drop out for food. Daisy wins the reward challenge. Back at camp, Andy names the merged tribe, "Soli Bula", which he claims means coming together, but he reveals later it means "sacrifice". After the initial meet and greet, David gathers the original Champions, minus Luke, to discuss reuniting to take out the Contenders. David fills the Champions in about everything going on with his tribe, including Shaun and Daisy's relationship and Andy's lies and trying to throw the immunity challenge. David proposes that either Shaun or Daisy go first as they are a powerful duo and Shaun could win a lot of challenges moving forward. Luke remains back at camp to be a spy on the Contenders and prevent them from talking together too much. Shaun does attempt to rally the original Contenders together to get rid of the Champions because he feels they are a united group. Later, Janine, Pia, and Abbey do discuss potentially blindsiding David as they believe his ego is getting out of hand and he is a dangerous player. Later, Daisy does receive the crate from the reward challenge and it contains all of the items used to tempt people to drop out of the challenge, including food, a phone call home, and an advantage in the next immunity challenge. Daisy also discovers a hidden immunity idol in the crate. When Daisy returns to camp, she tells everyone that the crate contained the food items. However, David believes she is lying because Jonathan said the crate would contain the tools to get you through the next phase of the game and he believes that this means Daisy got an idol. Daisy only reveals to Shaun that she got an idol, which gives the Contenders hope that they can use it to gain power.: Immunity challenge: Castaways will stand holding a rope which holds up a barrel containing 60 per cent of their individual body weight. The rope is threaded through a tile which will smash when the barrel is dropped. The last person left standing wins immunity.; Daisy's advantage is revealed to be that she can start the competition ten minutes after everyone else. After fifty minutes, the competition comes down to Abbey, Daisy, and Shaun. Shaun outlasts the others to win immunity. Back at camp, the Champions know their plan to get rid of Shaun will not happen as he won immunity. Since they are also concerned Daisy has an idol, the Champions propose to take out Andy as they believe that Andy is a strategic threat and they believe he has told several lies in the game which make him untrustworthy. The Champions even approach the Contenders to see if they would get rid of Andy. David also hopes to flush Daisy's idol and tells her that she is going to receive some votes because people believe she has an idol. Shaun believes that the Contenders should remain together and proposes to Daisy that the Contenders place their votes on David and that Daisy play her idol on Andy. However, Daisy has a concern about whether she can trust Andy because he tried to blindside her before. In an effort to save himself, Andy approaches David and tells him that he wasn't trying to throw the challenge and that Shaun and Daisy were the ones that wanted to lose the challenge. David doesn't know whether he can trust Andy or not and tells him that the only way he can prove his trust is if he votes for Daisy tonight. At Tribal Council, the tribe discusses the tribal lines, whether it is still Champions versus Contenders, and the concept of loyalty. During this discussion, Andy takes a lot of heat from David and Luke regarding some previous lies he's told, including throwing the immunity challenge and his attempt to blindside Daisy when Hannah left. Andy attempts to defend his actions to the tribe. After the votes are cast, Daisy decides to play her idol for herself. Daisy does negate one vote cast against her by Andy. However, the rest of the tribe unanimously determines that Andy's lies have caught up to him and he cannot be trusted. Andy becomes the thirteenth person voted out of Australian Survivor. On the way out, Andy admits to Daisy he did cast a vote or two for her and also blurts out that David has an idol with the hopes that he derails David's game.
117	15	"Episode 15"	Day 31—32	25 August 2019
On Day 31, the Champions celebrate winning the battle last night as they were able to force the Contenders to get rid of Andy and now they believe they can pick off the Contenders one by one. Some Champions are considering their own personal strategies: David is hoping to keep playing the model stereotype to throw people off, but he hopes to keep the Champions united to the end. Pia believes that she has been playing a good social game, she believes other Champions are her shields, and she hopes that if there is a blindside against a Champion, it would not be against her. Luke also believes that a good social game will get him far like it did the last time he played. Meanwhile, some of the Contenders are thinking about their own future. Shaun is very upset that the Contenders could not unite together because there was so much distrust between Andy and Daisy. Shaun believes that the Contenders will be picked off one by one unless they can sway some Champions to get rid of David. Baden incorporates a strategy of playing the middle and talks with Luke about moving forward together.: Reward challenge: The contestants will use their arms to brace themselves between two poles while their feet are perched on footholds. Throughout the challenge, they'll be moving down the pole to narrower footholds. The last person remaining on the poles will win a brand new MG ZS SUV and a picnic lunch.; After 100 minutes, Abbey wins reward. Abbey chooses David and John to go with her. While on the reward, David attempts to propose a final three with John and Abbey, but Abbey considers blindsiding him next Tribal. Back at camp, Shaun attempts to talk to Janine about getting rid of David because he's a strategic threat. Janine does take Shaun's arguments into consideration and strongly considers blindsiding David next.: Immunity challenge: Each contestant will take their position in between a barrier with bars. As the water comes in, the tide will rise and the breathing room will start to get shallower. Last person left under the bars will win immunity.; The challenge comes down to a fierce battle between Shaun and David. In the end, David wins immunity. Because of how late the challenge has gone, the tribe will be going to Tribal Council immediately after the challenge. In between, there are discussion regarding who should leave. Because David has won immunity, Shaun's plan to blindside him will not work. Shaun proposes to the Contenders that they vote Luke out because he is the biggest threat of the Contenders and he will win the game if he makes it to the end with his backstory. Meanwhile, the Champions consider sticking with their original plan to get rid of Shaun because he's been doing well in the challenges. At Tribal, David proposes to the Champions that they should just focus on the conversations from before the immunity challenge. Shaun proposes his plan to everyone that Luke should be voted out now because he's been playing a strong game and if he makes it to the end, he will win. David and Luke argue that Shaun will always be a physical threat in the challenges. Janine states that, tonight, she is intending on getting rid of a competition threat with her vote. The Contenders try to argue that Shaun is not going to win every immunity as the odds are so against that. When the voting takes place, Harry and Shaun vote for Luke, Baden and Simon vote for Daisy, but the remaining members of the tribe, including Shaun's closest ally Daisy, cast their votes for Shaun. Shaun becomes the fourteenth person voted out and the first member of the jury.
118	16	"Episode 16"	Day 33—34	26 August 2019
On Day 33, Daisy is feeling upset that she had to vote for Shaun last night, but she did so for her own protection as she felt she might have been voted out. Daisy believes that the Champions are just going to pick the Contenders off one by one. Meanwhile, David does believe that he is in control of the entire game as he has loyal allies in the Champions and he has an idol. David proposes to the Champions that they continue picking off the Contenders and vote Daisy out next as she has no connections to use in the game. However, Janine, Pia, and Abbey have been feeling for some time that David has been too overconfident and that if they don't take David out he will win. The three believe it is time to blindside David.: Immunity challenge: The contestants will race to dig up a bag of balls which they will bring back to a paddle. They will then have to roll their balls down the handle and land them on notches on the board of their paddle. The first person to land all six balls win win immunity.; Only Luke, Baden, and Abbey are able to actually dig up the balls and work on the paddle. Luke is able to land all six balls and wins his first immunity in any season he's participated. Back at camp, Janine, Pia, and Abbey put their plan into action to blindside David. Pia tells John and Harry while Abbey tells Daisy that David will be blindsided, but she needs to act like she is upset and going home to fool David. Pia believes that her acting skills will help with this blindside as she acts like she is being nice to David to prevent him from realizing something is up. Everyone is told about the blindside against David, except for Luke and David as they believe Luke would tip David off as they've been pals since the beginning. Janine and Pia hope that nobody tips David off because if they do, he could play an idol and really mess up plans. David states that he always brings his idol to Tribal with him and if he believes that something is up, he will play it. At Tribal, David and Janine both discuss how the Champions alliance has been strong since the merge and their votes tonight will be about keeping the numbers and alliances solid in the game. Daisy expresses concern that tonight will be her turn to leave. John also proposes to the Champions that they need to start thinking about their own positions in the game as somebody is on the bottom of the Champions alliance and that the Champions are playing it too safe. However, Janine specifically vocalizes that tonight is not the night to start making moves. These conversations are all done in an attempt to not make David suspect where the votes are actually going. When the voting takes place, Luke and David both vote for Harry. However, the rest of the tribe follows through with blindsiding David and David does not play his idol before the votes are read. David becomes the fifteenth person voted out of Australian Survivor and the second member of the jury.
119	17	"Episode 17"	Day 35—36	27 August 2019
After Tribal, the tribe celebrates the blindside against David. However, the Champions are very concerned about how Luke is feeling since he was left out of the plan. Daisy, Harry, and Baden still believe that the Champions will stay tight and try to look for an idol. Daisy is able to find an idol, but Luke and Pia discover that she found it when they come upon her and she starts acting suspicious. Luke and Pia consider keeping Daisy's idol a secret to possibly benefit them.: Reward challenge: The contestants will be divided into pairs and will use a pole to balance an idol. At regular intervals, they will add a section of pole to make the idol more difficult to hold up. If the idol drops, they are out. The last pair remaining will win a Chinese takeout.; Abbey and Janine win reward. Harry also wins because he sat out and picked the right pair to win. Simon is also picked to come on the reward. While on the reward, Janine proposes that Daisy be sent home next as the Champions are remaining strong and she has been able to build some trust with Harry.: Immunity challenge: The contestants will balance between two rails in a plank position. As the challenge goes on, the contestants' bodies will tire and they will fall off. Last person balanced between the rails will win immunity. (Simon wins); Back at camp, Daisy attempts to rally Harry, John, and Baden together with the hopes of taking out one of the former Champions. Daisy reveals to them that she found the idol, but that Luke and Pia found out about it. The former Contenders agree that tonight is their only night left to unite and they are just going to have to gamble that Daisy plays the idol on the right person. They also note that the Champions cannot split the vote. The Champions initially consider voting Daisy out like they initially planned, but Luke and Pia do reveal to the Champions that Daisy found an idol. In addition, Baden also reveals to Luke the Contenders' intention to unite as he wants to keep playing the middle and have options down the road. The Champions then consider whether they want to vote for Harry as the second option or vote for John because he would be third in line. The Champions also try to make Daisy paranoid that the votes are coming for her because she previously played her idol on herself last time she had it. At Tribal, Daisy openly wears her idol for everyone to see. The scenario is clearly laid out that the Champions are staying united and the Contenders will be playing their idol to try and overthrow them. The issue is whether Daisy plays the idol on the right person. Harry and John try to put in the minds of the Champions that they will eventually have to vote each other out and someone is on the bottom. Janine appeals to Daisy not to play her idol on the wrong person because as long as Daisy is in the game, she will still have life in the game and things can change. The voting takes place and Daisy plays her idol on herself. However, the Champions decided to place their votes on John. Luke threw a vote towards Harry and the Contenders placed their votes on Abbey. This results in a 4-4 tie between Abbey and John. The tribe revotes and this time the Champions unite in their vote to vote out John. John becomes the sixteenth person voted out and becomes the third member of the jury.
120	18	"Episode 18"	Day 37—38	1 September 2019
On Day 37, the Champions have once again claimed victory with the vote and Daisy is feeling down about playing her idol incorrectly. Daisy and Harry both try to look for another idol. In order to stir up trouble, Daisy lies and tells Luke that someone from his alliance told her that Luke revealed Daisy's idol discovery to the Champions. This upsets Luke and causes him to believe that there might be a mole feeding information to the Contenders. Luke believes it might be Pia as she was also there when Daisy's idol was discovered.: Reward challenge: The contestants will be divide into pairs and will hold onto a wall using numbered pegs. At regular intervals, the contestants will alternate removing pegs from the wall. If anyone falls off the wall, the pair is out. Last pair standing wins an overnight stay at the Survivor spa.; Simon and Janine win the reward and choose Pia and Daisy to join them on the reward. While at the spa reward, the four discuss Daisy's previous idol play and how Luke thinks Pia told Daisy about the idol reveal to the Champions. Pia is very concerned that this might have damaged her relationship with Luke and she isn't able to talk to him until tomorrow. The four discuss the fact that Luke is a strong competitor and will win the game if he gets to the end. They discuss blindsiding Luke at the next Tribal. Back at camp, Luke questions Harry and Baden about whether there is a mole from the Contenders. Harry and Baden state that Pia told Daisy about the idol revelation. Luke believes that if he doesn't make a move soon, then the Champions are just going to blindside him. Harry proposes to Luke that he join them to take out Janine at the next Tribal and Luke actually states that he would be onboard to vote out Janine.: Immunity challenge: The contestants will pull up on a weighted frame, clamping a ball between two jaws. If the contestant releases the pressure, the ball will drop and they are out. The last person holding their ball up will win immunity.; At the end of the challenge, Simon cuts a deal with Janine that if he gives her immunity, she'll take him on one of the next two rewards. Janine agrees and ends up winning immunity. Back at camp, Janine rallies Abbey, Pia, and Simon and proposes to vote Daisy out next because she doesn't have many strong relationships and she is an unpredictable player. Simon believes that they should stick with the plan to get rid of Luke since they discussed it at the spa. In order to make Daisy feel safe, Janine tells Daisy that the vote is against Harry. This makes Daisy suspicious as the plan at the spa was to vote out Luke. Daisy then pulls Luke aside and reveals the plan at the spa to blindside Luke. Pia does talk with Luke to see if she can convince him that she never revealed information to the Contenders. Because Janine won immunity, the Contenders propose to Luke that they vote out Pia as she is Janine's closest ally. Luke is unsure of what to do because he doesn't know if he can trust his Champions alliance anymore, but he also doesn't know how much farther he would get with the Contenders. At Tribal, the discussions at the spa reward regarding voting Luke out are discussed. Janine argues that the plan to vote Luke out was merely a plan to misdirect Daisy into believing that she was safe because Daisy was the next to go. Daisy argues that this was not a misdirection and believes that the Champions were truly intending to turn on Luke. At this point, Jonathan reveals to the group that there is a twist. Jonathan states that the next two people vote out will go to Exile Beach, compete in a duel, and the winner will return to the game. After the tribe votes, Pia and Daisy vote for Harry, but the remaining members of the tribe all vote Daisy out. Daisy is sent to Exile Beach.
121	19	"Episode 19"	Day 39—40	2 September 2019
On Day 39, Baden and Harry are concerned about the Champions sending one of them to Exile Beach to battle Daisy and hope to make a move to split up the Champions. Harry and Baden approach Luke to see if he is ready to make a move and Luke states that he's ready to shake up the game. In order to have the majority, Harry also approaches Abbey to convince her to flip on Janine, Simon, and Pia. Harry argues that it would be risky for Abbey to go to the end with Janine or Pia because Janine is perceived to be in control and Pia has an amazing social game. Abbey begins to ponder on whether she has relied too much on her allies and whether she does need to make a move to improve her chances of winning.: Immunity challenge: The contestants will lay on a steep ramp with water running down it while holding onto a bar. If they let go of the bar and fall, they are out. Last person holding the bar will win Immunity. (Pia wins); Back at camp, Janine proposes to the Champions that they send Baden to Exile Beach as he has proven himself in the challenges. Harry, Baden, and Luke are set to blindside Janine, but when they approach Abbey with the plan she is not comfortable with it. Abbey believes that if she blindsides Janine and Janine comes back into the game then she could rally the votes to get rid of her. Abbey does express an interest in sending Simon to Exile Beach because he's a physical threat and he likely wouldn't be able to orchestrate a move against her if he came back. At Tribal, Janine believes that the Champions will stay solid and send another Contender to Exile Beach because sending a Champion would just cause more tension in camp. Harry and Baden argue that with seven people left, now would be a smart time for certain Champions to make their move. When the votes are cast, Simon voted for Abbey, Pia and Janine voted for Baden, but Luke and Abbey joined with Harry and Baden to blindside Simon. Simon is sent to Exile Beach.
122	20	"Episode 20"	Day 41—42	3 September 2019
Simon arrives on Exile Beach, stunned that he was blindsided by Abbey and Luke. Daisy is also surprised to see that Simon was voted out and expected a Contender to join her. Both are motivated to get back into the game and get revenge on the people that blindsided them.: Exile Duel: Daisy and Simon will walk across a balance beam with a long pole and use that pole to guide a series of discs through a maze, stacking the discs on top of each other. If they hit the maze, it will cause the discs to fall and they will have to start over. First person to stack all ten discs will win their spot back into the game.; After a close back and forth battle, Simon defeats Daisy and reenters the game. Daisy becomes the seventeenth person eliminated from Australian Survivor and the fourth member of the jury. Back at camp, Simon sets out to look for an idol to keep himself in the game. As it stands, Janine and Pia now feel like they are on the bottom of the tribe after Luke and Abbey blindsided Simon and are feeling vulnerable.: Immunity challenge: The contestants will hold onto a rope to balance a wobbly table, race out to collect wooden blocks, and stack them on the table to spell the word, "Immunity". First person to finish will win. (Luke wins); Back at camp, Abbey is hoping to vote Simon out again as he has proven himself to be a physical threat. Abbey and Luke try to get Janine and Pia onboard with a plan to blindside Simon, promising to reunite the Champions once Simon is gone. However, Janine and Pia believe they've lost all trust in Abbey and attempt to convince Simon and Harry to join with them to blindside Abbey as she has proven herself to be untrustworthy. Simon joins the plan as he knows that Janine and Pia did not vote him out at the last Tribal. Harry considers his options as he does want to continue making big moves, but questions if Abbey is the right person to vote out. At Tribal, the tribe discusses Simon's previous elimination and the fact that they are getting so close to the end. Janine does acknowledge how blindsided she felt after the last Tribal and Abbey justifies the moves she has made in the game, thus far. When the votes are cast, it is revealed that the alliance of Harry, Abbey, Baden, and Luke have stuck together and even Janine and Pia joined with them to unanimously eliminate Simon for the second time. Simon becomes the eighteenth person voted out of Australian Survivor and the fifth member of the jury.
123	21	"Episode 21"	Days 43—44	9 September 2019
On Day 43, Pia celebrates her birthday while the game is still going. Pia hopes to be able to turn the game around as she does feel like she is on the bottom after Abbey flipped. Luke is starting to feel like he's become a target and hopes to continue winning immunity to get to the end. Harry believes that in order for him to win, he does need to take Luke out. Harry, Pia, Janine, and Baden propose to band together and vote Luke out next if he doesn't win immunity.: Immunity challenge: The contestants will be tethered to a rope woven through a frame. They will have to untangle as much rope as they think they need to get across a balance beam to throw beanbags at a target to release a key. They will then unlock themselves from the rope and complete a puzzle. First to finish the puzzle wins immunity. (Luke wins); With Luke winning immunity, plans to blindside him cannot occur. Janine proposes to Pia, Harry, and Baden that they vote Abbey out as she is the next biggest physical threat. However, Harry considers blindsiding Janine next as she has been seen as a leader among the Champions and he believes that getting rid of his nemesis will allow him to win the game. In order to get Luke and Abbey to stay on their side, Harry and Baden reveal that they had previously talked with Janine and Pia about getting rid of Luke. This surprises both Abbey and Luke as they thought they could trust Harry and Baden. Luke and Abbey both discuss plans with Janine and Pia about reuniting the Champions to get rid of Harry and Baden and also consider sticking with Harry and Baden to get rid of Janine. At Tribal, there are discussions about the Champions reuniting and going to the end together. Harry and Baden try to convince Luke and Abbey to stick with them and make the right move for their own games. In the end, Janine and Pia both vote for Baden, but Luke and Abbey stick with their alliance with Harry and Baden to blindside Godmother Janine. Janine becomes the nineteenth person voted out of Australian Survivor and becomes the sixth member of the jury.
124	22	"Episode 22"	Days 45—46	10 September 2019
After Janine's elimination, Abbey, Harry, and Baden make a final three deal and propose to get rid of Luke next with Pia as a backup option if Luke wins immunity. Meanwhile, Pia is very aware that she is on the bottom with Janine being eliminated. Pia tries to reestablish her connection with Luke and tells him that she has no interest in voting him out. Luke knows that he has established himself as a physical threat and his strong game and he needs to keep winning immunity. While walking in the woods, Luke spots a note on a tree branch and is led to a marked coconut near the beach. He opens and finds an advantage: he has the power to send anyone back to camp at the next Tribal Council. This person would not take part in the vote, but would be safe. Luke is thrilled to have found this power.: Immunity challenge: The contestants will stack a series of blocks on a beam while attempting to avoid a trip obstacle. They will stack the blocks like dominoes, knocking them over, and hitting a gong at the end. The first to do this successfully will win immunity. (Luke wins); Back at camp, Abbey, Baden, and Harry agree to vote Pia out next since Luke won immunity. Pia proposes to Luke that they vote Abbey out because she is the next biggest physical threat next to Luke. However, Pia knows that they don't have the numbers to do so. Luke tells Pia to trust him tonight because he has a plan that can help them. At Tribal, Luke plays his advantage and sends Baden back to camp. Luke then has private, whisper conversations with Pia and Abbey. The Tribal is full of whispering and Harry believes that it is going to be him voted out as nobody has whispered to him. It is believed that Luke whispered to Abbey that the plan was to vote out Harry to split up Harry and Abbey's votes and prevent a tie. When the votes are read, Harry voted for Pia, Abbey voted for Harry, but Luke and Pia have banded together and their two votes for Abbey are enough. Abbey becomes the twentieth person voted out and the seventh member of the jury.
125	23	"Episode 23"	Days 47	16 September 2019
After Tribal, Luke is happy that everything went according to plan and Abbey left. Pia is pleased with herself for reestablishing her relationship with Luke and believes that this saved her. At this point, Luke hopes to continue winning immunity to get to the end as he believes he has played the best game and he will surely be voted out without immunity. The final four receive a small box at tree mail which is a small question and answer game about their fellow contestants. During the challenge, Luke and Baden win a reward of burgers.: Immunity challenge: The contestants will drop a ball into the top of a maze, run back down the stairs to catch the ball at the bottom, and feed it back into the top. At regular intervals, they will add three additional balls. If any ball drops, they are out. Last person to keep all their balls in the maze wins. (Harry wins); Back at camp, Harry is intent on voting Luke out as he knows that Luke will win the game if he makes it to the end. Luke is very aware of his precarious position. Luke talks with Baden and Pia to see if they would be willing to give him a chance at fire. Baden is set on getting rid of Luke, but Pia antagonizes over the decision of whether to vote for Baden or Luke. Pia knows that Luke is here for his family and she knows that the money would mean a lot to his children, but she also has her own family to provide for. This conversations causes Luke and Pia to both express emotion about the scenario they find themselves in the game. At Tribal, Harry expresses that Luke must leave if the other three want a chance to win. Luke makes his final pitch to Pia asking if she would force a tie vote and at least give Luke a chance at a fire challenge with Baden and reminds her that he did save her the previous night when he voted out Abbey. Luke also promises Pia the spot in the final two with him. Pia observes that tonight is a crucial moment for her because she has to weigh whether she can beat Luke versus whether Harry or Baden would take her to the final two. After the votes are cast, Pia ultimately decides to join Harry and Baden in the vote to eliminate Luke. Luke becomes the twenty-first person voted out of Australian Survivor and the eighth member of the jury.
126	24	"Episode 24"	Days 48—50	17 September 2019
The final three arrive for the final immunity challenge of the season. They are joined by their family: Baden's parents and brother, Harry's girlfriend and mother, and Pia's husband and her children.: Final immunity challenge: The contestants will stand on narrow pedestals while holding onto ropes attached to two heavy idols. If they release their idols or take a foot off the pedestal, they will be out. The last person remaining will win immunity and guarantee their spot in the final two.; All three contestants last more than six hours and break the record for longest challenge in Australian Survivor history. Harry is the first to drop out with Pia dropping out soon after. Baden wins final immunity. At Tribal, both Harry and Pia make pitches to Baden for their spot in the final two. Pia argues that Harry has played a stronger game, if Harry goes to the end then Baden might have trouble claiming some moves, and Pia also argues that Harry has been a target in the game and taking him out would be a good move for Baden. Harry argues that Pia has played a strong social game, Champions outnumbers Contenders on the jury, and Harry also notes to Baden that Baden has made stronger connections with the Champions than Harry ever did. In the end, Baden decides to cast his vote to eliminate Harry. Harry becomes the twenty-second person voted out of Australian Survivor and the ninth and final member of the jury.: Final Tribal Council: At final Tribal, both Baden and Pia make their arguments to the jury for why they should be crowned Sole Survivor. Baden states that his game was to always play the middle, he knew the Contenders would not be united going into the merge so he made relationships with the Champions, gathered as much information as he could from them, and he argues that he was never blindsided by any vote because he knew what would happen. Baden states that leaders in Australian Survivor get voted out so he waited until the last possible moment to step up, which is why he fought hard for immunity and eliminated Harry. Baden also cites his personal growth from being shy and awkward to actually being social and making friendships. Pia states that her game was to play a very social game as she knew she wasn't the most athletic and she was put on a Champions tribe of athletes. Pia notes how she was almost voted out first and helped change the vote to Anastasia. Pia states that she made strong alliances in the game and argues that she played a very strategic game when she blindsided David and aligned herself with bigger threats like Simon, Janine, and Luke to make sure that when the Champions alliance broke apart, she was not going to be voted out. From the jury questioning, Shaun wants both finalists to state why the other person shouldn't win, David accuses both Baden and Pia of being goats, Janine praises Pia as being the smiling assassin and having a strong social game, the jury does acknowledge that Baden did always seem to know what was going on with the votes, Luke asks Pia why he should vote for her, and Harry asks them to differentiate between being a passenger and navigating the votes. Both Baden and Pia admit that their games were more reserved and that they were never playing visible, out in the open games like some other players were. Both argue that when players put their games out in the open in Australian Survivor, it immediately makes them a target and they'll be voted out. Both believe that they guided votes and orchestrated blindsides behind the scenes and that neither one of them were just riding along in the game. Baden argues that Pia shouldn't win because she only rode the coattails of her alliance and was blindsided twice by the Simon and Janine votes whereas he was never blindsided. Baden also argues that he was always giving his input on the vote and he argues he was able to put a target more on David rather than Luke because he was working so well with Luke. Pia argues that Baden shouldn't win because he did not play any strategic game and surrounded himself with people who would just take him to the final two. Pia argues to David that she was never a goat and that she did orchestrate his blindside with Janine and Abbey. Pia also argues that she utilized her acting skills and social skills to make moves like when she got Anastasia voted out and when she blindsided David, she made sure David never saw the blindside coming. In addressing Luke, Pia states that voting him out was the hardest decision she made, she knew she could not beat him, but Pia argues that she stayed in the challenge for six hours to beat Harry because she knew if she took the opportunity away from Luke, then she was going to make it worth it. In the end, all nine members of the jury unanimously vote for Pia to be crowned the winner of Australian Survivor: Champions vs. Contenders II.

== Voting history ==
Tribal Phase (Days 1-28)

	Original tribes						Switched tribes		Kidnap (Note: On Day 20, instead of the Contenders voting out a castaway, the Champions chose a Contender to kidnap — bringing them over to the Champions. Shaun was 'kidnapped' by the Champions and became part of their tribe.)	Post-Kidnap					
Episode #	1	2	3	4	5	6	7	8	9	10		11	12		13
Day #	2	5	7	10	12	14	16	18	20	22		24	26		28
Eliminated	Anastasia	Laura	Susie	Nova	Steven	E.T.	Sam	Sarah	Shaun	Tie (Note: The Tribal Council vote resulted in a tie. Per the rules, a second vote was held where the castaways involved in the tie would not vote and the remaining castaways could only vote for those who tied.)	Hannah	Casey	Tie	Matt	Ross
Votes	9–3	8–4	6–5	6–2–2	8–1	5–3	5–2–2	6–2	6–1	2–2–1–0 (Note: David played a hidden immunity idol, therefore three votes against him were negated; Luke played a hidden immunity idol, however there were no votes against him.)	4–2	4–0 (Note: Harry played a hidden immunity idol, therefore four votes against him were negated.)	2–2–0 (Note: Harry played a hidden immunity idol, therefore three votes against him were negated.)	4–1	Evacuated (Note: No vote; Ross was pulled from the game due to a broken ankle. The planned Contender's Tribal Council was cancelled.)
Voter	Vote														
Pia	Anastasia		Susie	Nova	Steven	Simon						Casey	~~Harry~~	None (Note: Matt and Pia were not eligible to vote in the revote.)	
Baden		Laura					Sam	Sarah	Shaun	Hannah	Hannah				
Harry		Baden										Casey	Pia	Pia	
Luke	Pia		Susie	Nova	Steven	E.T.	Sam	Sarah	Shaun	Shaun	Shaun				
Abbey	Anastasia		Susie	Nova	Steven	E.T.						Casey	~~Harry~~	Matt	
Janine	Pia		Susie	Nova	Steven	E.T.						Casey	Matt	Matt	
Simon	Anastasia		Janine	Steven	Steven	E.T.						~~Harry~~	Matt	Matt	
Daisy		Baden					Sam	Sarah	Shaun	~~David~~	Hannah				
John		Laura					Sam	Sarah	Shaun	Hannah	Hannah				
David	Anastasia		Susie	Nova	Steven	Simon	Sam	Sarah	Shaun	Shaun	Shaun				
Shaun		Laura							Kidnap	~~David~~	None (Note: Hannah and Shaun were not eligible to vote in the revote.)				
Andy		Baden					Luke	Sarah	Shaun	Daisy	Hannah				
Ross	Anastasia		Susie	Nova	Steven	E.T.						~~Harry~~	~~Harry~~	Matt	
Matt		Laura										~~Harry~~	Pia	None	
Casey		Laura										~~Harry~~			
Hannah		Laura					Luke	Andy	Matt	~~David~~	None				
Sarah		Laura					David	Andy							
Sam		Laura					David								
E.T.	Anastasia		Janine	Steven	Steven	Simon									
Steven	Anastasia		Janine	Abbey	Pia										
Nova	Anastasia		Janine	Abbey											
Susie	Anastasia		Janine												
Laura		Baden													
Anastasia	Pia														

Individual phase (Day 29–50)

	Merged tribe					Exile Twist (Note: On Days 38 and 40, the Soli Bula tribe voted to send a tribemate to Exile Beach. On Day 41 the two exiled castaways dueled, with the winner returning to the tribe and the loser being officially eliminated form the game. Daisy and Simon were exiled. Simon won the duel, officially eliminating Daisy.)			Merged tribe				
Episode #	14	15	16	17		18	19	20		21	22	23	24
Day #	30	32	34	36		38	40	41	42	44	46	47	49
Eliminated	Andy	Shaun	David	Tie	John	Daisy	Simon	Daisy	Simon	Janine	Abbey	Luke	Harry
Vote	11–0 (Note: Daisy played a hidden immunity idol, therefore one vote against her was negated.)	7–2–2	8–2	4-4-1–0 (Note: Daisy played a hidden immunity idol, however there were no votes against her.)	4-3	6-2	4–2–1	Challenge	6–1	4–2	2–1–1	3–1	1–0
Voter	Vote												
Pia	Andy	Shaun	David	John	John	Harry	Baden		Simon	Baden	Abbey	Luke	None (Note: This contestant was only able to vote for one other contestant, thus they were not eligible to vote.)
Baden	Andy	Daisy	David	Abbey	Abbey	Daisy	Simon		Simon	Janine	Immune (Note: Luke played a "Send Away" Power on Baden - this sent Baden away from Tribal Council, so he did not participate in the vote but could not be voted against at this Tribal Council.)	Luke	Harry
Harry	Andy	Luke	David	Abbey	Abbey	Daisy	Simon		Simon	Janine	Pia	Luke	None
Luke	Andy	Shaun	Harry	Harry	John	Daisy	Simon		Simon	Janine	Abbey	Baden	
Abbey	Andy	Shaun	David	John	None (Note: Abbey and John were not eligible to vote in the revote.)	Daisy	Simon		Simon	Janine	Harry		
Janine	Andy	Shaun	David	John	John	Daisy	Baden		Simon	Baden			
Simon	Andy	Daisy	David	John	John	Daisy	Abbey	Win	Abbey				
Daisy	Andy	Shaun	David	Abbey	Abbey	Harry	Exiled	Lose					
John	Andy	Shaun	David	Abbey	None								
David	Andy	Shaun	Harry										
Shaun	Andy	Luke											
Andy	~~Daisy~~												

Final vote
Episode #	24	
Day #	50	
Finalist	Pia	Baden
Vote	9–0	
Juror	Vote	
Harry	Pia	
Luke	Pia	
Abbey	Pia	
Janine	Pia	
Simon	Pia	
Daisy	Pia	
John	Pia	
David	Pia	
Shaun	Pia	

== Reception ==
=== Ratings ===
Ratings data is from OzTAM and represents the viewership from the 5 largest Australian metropolitan centres (Sydney, Melbourne, Brisbane, Perth and Adelaide).

Wk	Ep	Air date	Timeslot	Overnight ratings		Consolidated ratings		Total ratings		Source
Wk	Ep	Air date	Timeslot	Viewers	Rank	Viewers	Rank	Viewers	Rank	Source
1	1	24 July 2019	Wednesday 7:30pm	807,000	5	117,000	3	925,000	3	
1	2	25 July 2019	Thursday 7:30pm	712,000	5	64,000	5	776,000	5	
2	3	28 July 2019	Sunday 7:30pm	562,000	7	82,000	3	644,000	6	
2	4	29 July 2019	Monday 7:30pm	655,000	11	108,000	2	763,000	9	
2	5	30 July 2019	Tuesday 7:30pm	641,000	10	128,000	1	768,000	7	
3	6	4 August 2019	Sunday 7:30pm	630,000	7	73,000	5	703,000	6	
3	7	5 August 2019	Monday 7:30pm	713,000	8	78,000	5	791,000	7	
3	8	6 August 2019	Tuesday 7:30pm	723,000	8	102,000	7	825,000	7	
4	9	11 August 2019	Sunday 7:30pm	693,000	5	71,000	5	764,000	5	
4	10	12 August 2019	Monday 7:30pm	711,000	8	84,000	4	795,000	8	
4	11	13 August 2019	Tuesday 7:30pm	739,000	7	94,000	3	833,000	6	
5	12	18 August 2019	Sunday 7:30pm	652,000	6	59,000	5	711,000	5	
5	13	19 August 2019	Monday 7:30pm	744,000	7	77,000	2	821,000	8	
5	14	20 August 2019	Tuesday 7:30pm	794,000	6	118,000	2	912,000	4	
6	15	25 August 2019	Sunday 7:30pm	735,000	4	65,000	5	801,000	4	
6	16	26 August 2019	Monday 7:30pm	819,000	7	72,000	5	891,000	6	
6	17	27 August 2019	Tuesday 7:30pm	804,000	7	109,000	2	912,000	5	
7	18	1 September 2019	Sunday 7:30pm	751,000	4	65,000	4	817,000	4	
7	19	2 September 2019	Monday 7:30pm	790,000	7	67,000	6	857,000	6	
7	20	3 September 2019	Tuesday 7:30pm	808,000	6	91,000	5	900,000	5	
8	21	9 September 2019	Monday 7:30pm	810,000	8	57,000	7	872,000	7	
8	22	10 September 2019	Tuesday 7:30pm	809,000	7	92,000	5	903,000	6	
9	23	16 September 2019	Monday 7:30pm	926,000	5	50,000	5	976,000	4	
9	24 (Note: The final episode was coded into two programs - the first titled "Grand Finale" and the second titled "Winner Announced". Because of this, two separate sets of ratings were produced.)	17 September 2019	Tuesday 7:30pm	923,000	5	45,000	7	968,000	4	
9	24	17 September 2019	Tuesday 7:30pm	1,040,000	3	52,000	5	1,079,000	1	
