= Shaun Hampson =

Australian rules footballer (born 1988)

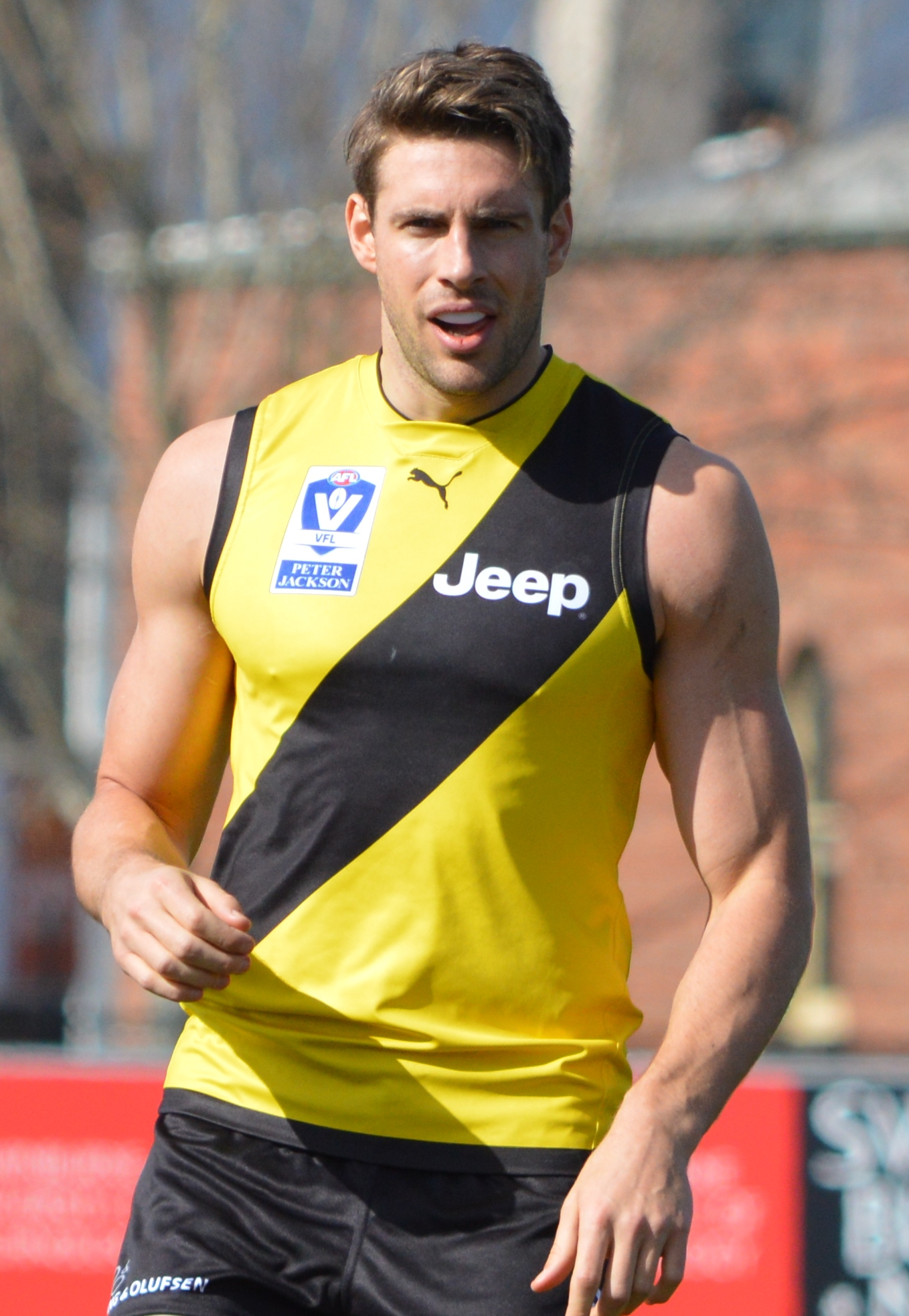
- Hampson with Richmond's VFL team in August 2017

Personal information
- Nickname: Hammer
- Born: 21 March 1988 (age 38); Box Hill, Victoria
- Original team: Mount Gravatt (AFLQ)
- Draft: No. 17, 2006 AFL National Draft
- Debut: Round 21, 2007, Carlton vs. North Melbourne, at Marvel Stadium
- Height: 201 cm (6 ft 7 in)
- Position: Ruckman/Forward

Club information
- Current club: North Melbourne

Playing career
Years	Club	Games (Goals)
2007–2013	Carlton	63 (32)
2014–2018	Richmond	35 (6)
Total		98 (38)

Shaun Hampson (born 21 March 1988) is a former Australian rules footballer who played 98 games across a 12-year career with Carlton and Richmond in the Australian Football League (AFL).

== Junior Football ==
Hampson excelled at sport at school, including athletics, swimming and soccer. He did not begin playing Australian football until 2004. He then joined Mount Gravatt Football Club in 2005, and by the end of the year he was the club's number one ruckman.

== AFL career ==
Hampson was drafted in the 2006 AFL draft by the Carlton Football Club (17th pick overall). He made his debut with Carlton in Round 21, 2007, against North Melbourne.

Hampson struggled with short-sightedness early in his career and had laser eye surgery prior to the 2012 season to improve it.

Hampson played 63 senior games for Carlton from 2007 until the end of the 2013 season. He was traded to Richmond in October 2013, in exchange for pick 28 in the AFL draft. He made his senior debut for Richmond in round one of the 2014 season against the Gold Coast Suns.

Hampson was affected by a back injury in 2017 and did not manage to play a match at AFL level. He managed six appearances with the club's VFL side.

He played in round 1 of the VFL season in 2018 but did not play another match after that due to a re-occurrence of the same back injury. Hampson announced his immediate retirement from AFL football on 26 June 2018, citing the ongoing effects of his two-year back troubles.

== Coaching career ==
In 2020, Hampson joined the Carlton Football Club AFLW program as a Ruck Coach, a role he held until the end of the 2022 season.

He returned to the Richmond Football Club in 2023 as an AFLW Assistant Coach in the Midfield, before moving into the club's VFL program as an Assistant Coach in the Midfield in 2024. In 2025, Hampson progressed to the AFL program as an Assistant Coach in the Midfield with the Richmond's men's team.

Ahead of the 2026 season, Hampson joined the North Melbourne Football Club as a Development Coach.

== Statistics ==
Legend
G	Goals	K	Kicks	D	Disposals	T	Tackles
B	Behinds	H	Handballs	M	Marks	H/O	Hit-outs

Season	Team	No.	Games	Totals								Averages (per game)							
Season	Team	No.	Games	G	B	K	H	D	M	T	H/O	G	B	K	H	D	M	T	H/O
2007	Carlton	22	2	1	0	6	5	11	5	0	16	0.5	0.0	3.0	2.5	5.5	2.5	0.0	8.0
2008	Carlton	22	10	1	0	26	34	60	20	6	82	0.1	0.0	2.6	3.4	6.0	2.0	0.6	8.2
2009	Carlton	22	15	3	4	35	89	124	34	31	278	0.2	0.3	2.3	5.9	8.3	2.3	2.1	18.5
2010	Carlton	22	8	6	8	28	29	57	22	19	104	0.8	1.0	3.5	3.6	7.1	2.8	2.4	13.0
2011	Carlton	22	9	3	5	29	45	74	21	17	185	0.3	0.6	3.2	5.0	8.2	2.3	1.9	20.6
2012	Carlton	22	13	15	4	61	59	120	51	24	240	1.2	0.3	4.7	4.5	9.2	3.9	1.8	18.5
2013	Carlton	22	6	3	5	38	25	63	26	12	70	0.5	0.8	6.3	4.2	10.5	4.3	2.0	11.7
2014	Richmond	16	11	1	2	26	66	92	20	11	318	0.1	0.2	2.4	6.0	8.4	1.8	1.0	28.9
2015	Richmond	16	4	0	3	18	10	28	13	3	90	0.0	0.8	4.5	2.5	7.0	3.3	0.8	22.5
2016	Richmond	16	20	5	4	65	93	158	50	36	652	0.3	0.2	3.3	4.7	7.9	2.5	1.8	32.6
2017	Richmond	16	0	—	—	—	—	—	—	—	—	—	—	—	—	—	—	—	—
2018	Richmond	16	0	—	—	—	—	—	—	—	—	—	—	—	—	—	—	—	—
Career			98	38	35	332	455	787	262	159	2035	0.4	0.4	3.4	4.6	8.0	2.7	1.6	20.8

== Personal life ==
In January 2011, Hampson began a relationship with Australian model Megan Gale. The pair's first child was born in May 2014. Their daughter Rosie was born in September 2017. Hampson and Gale announced their engagement in July 2017.

In 2019, Hampson competed in the sixth season of Australian Survivor, also known as Australian Survivor: Champions vs Contenders. He was eliminated on day 32, finishing in 11th place. In 2023, he returned to compete on Australian Survivor: Heroes V Villains. He improved from his original season, but was eliminated on Day 37, finishing in 8th place and becoming the third member of the jury.
