= Luke Toki =

Australian television personality (born 1986)

- Born: 7 October 1986 (age 40); Perth, Australia
- Occupations: Television personality; Real estate agent; Mining technician
- Years active: 2017–present
- Television: Australian Survivor 2017; Australian Survivor 2019; Big Brother VIP (winner); The Traitors; Australian Survivor: Australia V The World
- Spouse: Mary-Louise Toki
- Children: 3

Luke Toki (born 7 October 1986) is an Australian television personality, real estate agent and former mining technician who became known to reality television audiences as a contestant in the fourth, sixth and thirteenth seasons of the competition reality program Australian Survivor. Since appearing on Survivor, he has co-hosted its spin-off companion aftershow, Australian Survivor: Talking Tribal, and has participated in and won the first season of Big Brother VIP.

== Career ==
=== Australian Survivor ===
==== Season 4 ====
Toki was selected as one of twenty-four participants in the show's 2017 edition. Initially he was assigned to the Asaga tribe where he formed a close bond and alliance with Jericho Malabonga throughout the game. Toki survived forty-six days before being voted out in seventh place. He voted for Jericho to win.

==== Season 6 ====
Toki returned in the 2019 edition in the second Champions vs Contenders iteration as a member of the Champions tribe. He maintained solid bonds with the majority of his tribe and formed an alliance with David Genat when gaining possession of a hidden immunity idol. Aware that he would become a late-game target, Toki began to win numerous individual challenges and orchestrate several eliminations. After narrowly being beaten at the final four immunity challenges by Harry Hills, he pitched to Pia Miranda to force a vote between himself and Baden Gilbert which would go to a fire-making challenge. The plan failed and Toki survived forty-seven days overall finishing in fourth place. He voted for Pia to win.

==== Post-Survivor ====
Following his elimination from Champions vs Contenders, a GoFundMe page was created to raise funds. In under two days, upwards of A$500,000 had been raised (exceeding the grand prize of Australian Survivor). Toki has been branded by Australian Survivor fans as the "greatest player to have never won" the show.

Since 2020, Toki has co-hosted the Australian Survivor aftershow Talking Tribal, a companion series introduced in the All Stars season, which unpacks all of the castaways’ strategies from the main show. The show aired weekly, after each Wednesday episode of the main show, as a web series on 10 Play and as an audio podcast on 10's podcast platform 10 Speaks.

In May 2023, Toki was announced as a contestant on the second season of the Australian version of The Traitors, which aired in August 2023.

=== Big Brother VIP ===
In August 2021, Toki was announced by Seven Network as a contestant on the first series of Big Brother VIP, a spin-off celebrity series of Big Brother. On 23 November 2021, Toki was announced as the series' winner.

== Personal life ==
Toki worked as a mining technician in Western Australia. In July 2022, he announced that he had changed professions and was now working as a real estate agent.

He is married to Mary-Louise Toki and has three children: two sons, born in 2012 and 2014, and a daughter, born in 2019, who has cystic fibrosis.

=== Controversy ===
In December 2021, Toki's home was raided by the police after it was revealed that he was a co-owner of trucking business Segano Holdings, which was directed and co-owned by biker gang commander Nikola Maksimovic who was convicted of methamphetamine trafficking and property and money laundering. Toki denied the allegations of links to bikie gangs and had not been linked by police to Maksimovic's offences.

== Filmography ==
=== Television ===
Year	Programme	Role	Notes
2017, 2019, 2025	Australian Survivor	Contestant	Season 4, Season 6 & Season 13
2017	All Star Family Feud	Contestant	
2020–2021	Australian Survivor: Talking Tribal	Co-host	Companion show
2021	Big Brother VIP	Contestant	
2023	The Traitors	Contestant - Faithful	
