= Big Brother VIP (Australian TV series) =

Australia version of celebrity big brother

- Also known as: Celebrity Big Brother Australia (UK)
- Genre: Reality
- Based on: Big Brother by John de Mol Jr.
- Presented by: Sonia Kruger
- Country of origin: Australia
- Original language: English
- No. of seasons: 1
- No. of episodes: 11

Production
- Camera setup: Multi-camera
- Production company: Endemol Shine Australia

Original release
- Network: Seven Network
- Release: 1 November – 23 November 2021

Related
- Big Brother

Big Brother VIP is a spin-off series of the Australian version of the Dutch reality television franchise Big Brother. The series was announced on 30 March 2021 and was hosted by Sonia Kruger. The series premiered on 1 November 2021.

This season revolved around 12 celebrities living in a house together with no communication with the outside world as they competed for $100,000 charity prize. They were constantly filmed during their time in the house and were not permitted to communicate with those filming them. The format of the series was the same as the Channel 7 civilian version, with the format emphasising competition and gameplay. The celebrity housemates competed in challenges for power and safety before voting each other out of the house. When only three housemates remained, the Australian public voted to decide which finalist would win the game and win the grand prize for their nominated charity.

== History ==
The first celebrity edition, titled Celebrity Big Brother, aired on Network Ten in 2002 and was won by Dylan Lewis. No further celebrity editions were commissioned before the entire franchise was axed by the network in 2008.

In 2011, it was confirmed that the Big Brother franchise would be revived by Nine Network. Following the conclusion of the 2014 civilian season, rumours had begun circulating that Nine were looking at reviving the Celebrity Big Brother edition of the show for broadcast in 2015 which were later confirmed by host Sonia Kruger. By July 2015, it was reported that the fourth season of The Celebrity Apprentice Australia had replaced the proposed Celebrity Big Brother revival. While it was also said it was possible something could happen the following year in 2016, nothing ever eventuated and the 2014 season became the last season of the franchise to air on Nine.

== Format ==
Big Brother VIP follows the same rebooted format of the series that launched with the twelfth season of the series, which itself resembles the format of the American & Canadian editions of Big Brother - with housemates determining both Nominations and Evictions. The format has emphasis on the competitive aspect of surviving the eviction process. As such, the housemates are permitted to strategise, politic and collude about the nominations and evictions. However, there are still key differences compared to the North American format, most prominently, no "Power of Veto" is included as part of the format (a staple of the American and Canadian shows), and the Australian public deciding the eventual winner - rather than being decided by a Jury formed of evicted housemates.

- Nominations: At the start of each round, the housemates compete in a "Nomination Challenge". The winner of the competition has the sole power over the nominations. Immediately after the challenge, the winning housemate will be called to the Diary Room by Big Brother to name their nominees, and provide full reasons for their nominations. The number of nominees is determined by how far into the overall game housemates are, as the game starts with three nominees and reduces to two nominees towards the end of the game.
- Eviction: On eviction night, all housemates must vote to evict one of the nominees, with the exception of the nominating housemate (who will only cast a tie-breaker vote, if required), nor do the nominated housemates vote when there are only two nominees (on account of their votes cancelling the other's out). The eviction vote is by secret ballot, with housemates casting their votes orally in the Diary Room to Big Brother, and must provide a reason for their vote. The nominee with the most votes is evicted from the house.
- Finale: The final housemates will face Australia's vote to determine the winner.

=== Teams ===
Following completing a secret mission issued to them by Big Brother, Caitlyn and Ellie earned the right to each become a captain of one of the two teams that the house would be split into. During this team phase of the game the Nomination Challenge saw the two teams competing against each other, with the winning team earning safety for themselves and the team captain being responsible for deciding who to nominate for eviction from the opposing team. The team phase of the game concluded after the second eviction.

Team	Captain	Members
Jenner-ators	Caitlyn	Imogen, Josh, Matt, Thomas
Hard Knocks	Ellie	Bernard, Dayne, Luke, Jessika, Omarosa

== Housemates ==
On 8 August 2021, Channel Seven revealed the 12 celebrities competing in the series.

Housemate	Age	Notability	Charity	Day entered	Day exited	Status
Luke Toki	34	Australian Survivor contestant	Perth Children's Hospital Foundation	1	22	Winner
Ellie Gonsalves	31	Model and actress	Wildlife Warriors	1	22	Runner-up
Josh Carroll	31	Model	Keith's Closet	1	22	Runner-up
Imogen Anthony	30	Model	Zambi Wildlife Foundation	1	21	Evicted
Jessika Power	28	Married at First Sight contestant	Australian Childhood Foundation	1	20	Evicted
Thomas Markle Jr.	55	Meghan, Duchess of Sussex's brother	ASTHA	1	18	Evicted
Dayne Beams	31	Former AFL player	Love Me, Love You	1	17	Evicted
Bernard Curry	47	Actor	One In Five	1	12	Evicted
Danny Hayes	48	Big Brother 2021 housemate	Lifeline	6	10	Evicted
Caitlyn Jenner	71	Olympic gold medalist and media personality	Trans Pride Australia	1	8	Evicted
Matt Cooper	42	Former NRL player	Livin	1	6	Evicted
Omarosa	47	Reality TV star, author and former political aide	Deaf Children Australia	1	4	Evicted

== Episodes ==
No.	Title	Day(s)	Original release date	Australian viewers
Week 1
1	Episode 1	Day 1–3	1 November 2021	377,000
2	Episode 2	Day 3–4	2 November 2021	380,000
3	Episode 3	Day 4–6	3 November 2021	375,000
Week 2
4	Episode 4	Day 6–8	8 November 2021	363,000
5	Episode 5	Day 8–10	9 November 2021	337,000
6	Episode 6	Day 10–12	10 November 2021	310,000
Week 3
7	Episode 7	Day 14–15	15 November 2021	320,000
8	Episode 8	Day 15–17	16 November 2021	302,000
9	Episode 9	Day 17–18	17 November 2021	295,000
Week 4
10	Episode 10	Day 20–21	22 November 2021	340,000
11	Episode 11	Day 21–22	23 November 2021	311,000

== Production ==
In advance of the series being announced in March 2021, it was confirmed in December 2020 that the show was issued an eviction notice by NSW National Parks & Wildlife Service for the North Head site used as the location of the house for the previous two series of the civilian series over concerns for local wildlife due to concerns from increased traffic and attention to the site. In July 2021, it was confirmed that the site of the new Big Brother house used for the series would be constructed in the White Pavilion at the Sydney Olympic Park at Homebush Bay.

In June 2021, it was confirmed that the series would be extended in some capacity due to the tenth season of Australia's Got Talent being delayed due to COVID-19 pandemic restrictions that came into effect in Sydney shortly before production was set to begin.

Filming commenced on 30 July 2021 and wrapped on 20 August 2021 after 22 days of filming. Unlike previous seasons that have aired on Seven, the finale was not broadcast live and was pre-recorded with the rest of the season. All three possible outcomes were filmed and the result of the vote by the Australian public determined which was aired.

In October 2021, a second season of Big Brother VIP was announced at Seven's 2022 Upfront presentation — prior to the broadcast of the first season — and was slated to air in 2022. However, it was announced in February 2022 the series was "not proceeding".

=== Katie Hopkins controversy ===
In July 2021, Katie Hopkins, who was set to appear on the show after appearing on the fifteenth season of Celebrity Big Brother UK in 2015, made multiple posts on Instagram mocking several lockdown measures in place in Sydney, as well as stating she was intentionally not following rules in place. Her entry into the country sparked backlash due to the number of Australians stranded overseas due to state intake limits that were in place as well as the controversial nature of Hopkins as a public figure. Seven condemned the statements she had made and also confirmed she would no longer be a part of the series. Her visa was ultimately canceled, she was fined $1,000 and was also escorted to Sydney Airport by police on July 19, 2021, for deportation back to the UK. Due to a pay-or-play clause in her contract, Hopkins was still paid her full appearance fee.

=== International broadcast ===
The series was broadcast in New Zealand on TVNZ 2 and TVNZ OnDemand, with episodes being released the day after their broadcast in Australia. The series was later broadcast in the UK, under the localised title Celebrity Big Brother Australia, on E4 starting on 6 February 2022, however it was removed from the schedule after airing four episodes but continued to be released via the All 4 on-demand service.

== Voting history ==
This housemate was nominated for eviction.
This housemate was the nominating Housemate on this round.
This housemate was immune from this round of eviction due to a twist.
This housemate was on the winning team in the challenge and is immune for this round of eviction.
This housemate was not in the Main House and did not participate in this round of eviction.
This housemate was originally nominated but was saved from eviction.

Team Phase

For the first two rounds of eviction, the housemates competed in two teams.

- The Jenner-ators (denoted by ), led by Caitlyn
- Hard Knocks (denoted by ), led by Ellie.

The winning team would win immunity, with their captain earning the power over nominations. Danny, who entered after the final team challenge, was not assigned to either team. After the second eviction on Day 6, the game reverted to the regular format, with the Housemates playing as individuals.

	Pre-Teams	Team Phase		Individual Phase											
Week	Week 1			Week 2			Week 3					Week 4			
Episode	1	2	3	4	5	6	7		8	9		10		Finale	
Nominating Housemate(s)	Ellie	Caitlyn	Ellie	(none)	Bernard	Josh	Jessika		(none)	Imogen; Jessika	Luke	Ellie	Josh	(none)	
Nominations	(none)	Bernard; Dayne; Omarosa	Josh; Matt; Thomas	All; Housemates	Danny; Josh; Thomas	Bernard; Ellie; ~~Luke~~	Dayne; Ellie; Thomas	Dayne; Thomas	Dayne; Ellie	Thomas	Ellie	Imogen; Jessika	Ellie; Imogen; Luke	(none)	
Luke	Half Room	Omarosa	Matt	Nominated	Josh	Hidden	Ellie	Dayne	Dayne	Thomas		Jessika	Nominated	Winner (Day 22)	
Ellie	Nominating; Housemate	Omarosa	Nominating; Housemate	Nominated	Danny	Nominated	Dayne	Fake; Evicted	Nominated	Nominated		Nominating; Housemate	Nominated	Runner-up (Day 22)	
Josh	No voting	Bernard	Matt	Nominated	Danny	Nominating; Housemate	Ellie	Thomas	Ellie	Thomas		Jessika	Imogen	Runner-up (Day 22)	
Imogen	Half Room	Omarosa	Matt	Nominated	Danny	Bernard	Ellie	Dayne	Dayne	Thomas		Nominated	Nominated	Evicted (Day 21)	
Jessika	No voting	Omarosa	Matt	Nominated	Thomas	Bernard	Nominating; Housemate		Dayne	Thomas		Nominated	Evicted (Day 20)		
Thomas	No voting	Dayne	Josh	Nominated	Danny	Bernard	Ellie	Nominated	Ellie	Nominated		Evicted (Day 18)			
Dayne	No voting	Bernard	Thomas	Nominated	Josh	Bernard	Ellie	Nominated	Nominated	Evicted (Day 17)					
Bernard	No voting	Omarosa	Matt	Nominated	Nominating; Housemate	Nominated	Evicted (Day 12)								
Danny	Not in House		Matt	Nominated	Thomas	Evicted (Day 10)									
Caitlyn	Half Room	Nominating; Housemate	Thomas	Nominated	Evicted (Day 8)										
Matt	No voting	Bernard	Thomas	Evicted (Day 6)											
Omarosa	No voting	Dayne	Evicted (Day 4)												
Notes	(Note: Episode 1 was a non-eviction episode. Instead, Ellie was tasked to save one Housemates in the Half-Room, making both the rescueee and Elle team captains,)	(Note: While Omarosa was evicted, she visited new Housemate Danny in a secret room to provide insight before he enters the game. Danny entered the game on Day 6 after nominations were made.)		(Note: After the VIP Museum task, Big Brother informed the housemates that they were all nominated for Instant Eviction - with the Housemates having to decide the next evictee by group decision. Caitlyn decided to be the instant evictee, and the other housemates agreed.)	(Note: Caitlyn got to award a Housemate immunity from the next eviction. She gave immunity to Ellie)	(Note: Luke won an Advantage Challenge - granting him the advantage to hide a nominee in the “Waste Room” during the Eviction Ceremony, vetoing their Nomination. Luke chose to hide himself. As he was hidden, Luke did not vote. The eviction continued with Ellie & Bernard nominated, with the nominees not voting as their votes would cancel the other's out.)	(Note: Day 15 was a Fake Double Eviction. Following Ellie's eviction, a second vote between surviving nominees Thomas & Dayne was held. As their votes would cancel the others out, Thomas & Dayne did not vote. After being voted out, Ellie & Dayne secretly moved to the Big Brother Gym.)		(Note: On Day 17, the Fake Evictees returned to the main house to compete in a challenge against the remaining Housemates. The winning team would officially evict someone from the other group. The remaining Housemates won and Dayne was officially evicted.)	(Note: Two Nomination Challenges took place, with the winner of each challenge being able to nominate a single housemate for eviction. The first challenge was contested in pairs and won by Imogen and Jessika. The first housemate nominated, Thomas, was ineligible to compete in the second challenge.)			(Note: The winner of Final Challenge won their place in the Final 3 and the sole vote at the Final Eviction. The other three housemates were nominated for the Final Eviction.)	, (Note: The Final 3 competed in a special Charity Challenge for $10,000 for their charity. Luke won.) (Note: For the finale, Australia decided the winner of Big Brother VIP and the $100,000 charity prize.)	
Source	none			-					-	-		-	-	-	
Evicted	No Eviction	Omarosa; 5 of 10 votes to evict	Matt; 6 of 10 votes to evict	Caitlyn; Consensus decision to evict	Danny; 4 of 8 votes to evict	Bernard; 4 of 4 votes to evict	Ellie; 5 of 6 votes to fake evict	Dayne; 2 of 3 votes to fake evict	Dayne; 3 of 5 votes to evict	Thomas; 4 of 4 votes to evict		Jessika; 2 of 2 votes to evict	Imogen; Josh's choice to evict	Josh; Fewest votes to win	Ellie; Fewest votes to win
Saved	No Eviction	Bernard; 3 of 10 votes to evict	Thomas; 3 of 10 votes to evict	All Other; Housemates; Consensus decision to stay	Josh; 2 of 8 votes to evict	Ellie; 0 of 4 votes to evict	Dayne; 1 of 6 votes to fake evict	Thomas; 1 of 3 votes to fake evict	Ellie; 2 of 5 votes to evict	Ellie; 0 of 4 votes to evict		Imogen; 0 of 2 votes to evict	Ellie; Josh's choice to save	Luke; Most votes to win	
Saved	No Eviction	Dayne; 2 of 10 votes to evictt	Josh; 1 of 10 votes to evict	All Other; Housemates; Consensus decision to stay	Thomas; 2 of 8 votes to evict	Ellie; 0 of 4 votes to evict	Thomas; 0 of 6 votes to fake evict	Thomas; 1 of 3 votes to fake evict	Ellie; 2 of 5 votes to evict	Ellie; 0 of 4 votes to evict		Imogen; 0 of 2 votes to evict	Luke; Josh's choice to save	Luke; Most votes to win	

== Reception ==
=== Ratings ===
Ratings data is from OzTAM and represents the viewership from the 5 largest Australian metropolitan centres (Sydney, Melbourne, Brisbane, Perth and Adelaide).

Wk	Ep	Air date	Timeslot	Overnight ratings		Consolidated ratings		Total ratings		Ref(s)
Wk	Ep	Air date	Timeslot	Viewers	Rank	Viewers	Rank	Viewers	Rank	Ref(s)
1	1	1 November 2021	Monday 7:30pm	377,000	16					
1	2	2 November 2021	Tuesday 7:30pm	380,000	18					
1	3	3 November 2021	Wednesday 7:30pm	375,000	16					
2	4	8 November 2021	Monday 7:30pm	363,000	18					
2	5	9 November 2021	Tuesday 7:30pm	337,000	16					
2	6	10 November 2021	Wednesday 7:30pm	310,000	17					
3	7	15 November 2021	Monday 7:30pm	320,000	18					
3	8	16 November 2021	Tuesday 7:30pm	302,000	17					
3	9	17 November 2021	Wednesday 7:30pm	295,000	16					
4	10	22 November 2021	Monday 7:30pm	340,000	20					
4	11	23 November 2021	Tuesday 7:30pm	311,000	18					

=== Accolades ===
Year	Award	Category	Nominee(s)	Result	Ref.
2022	TV Tonight Awards: Worst of 2021	Worst Australian Show	Big Brother VIP	Nominated	
