= The Naked Magicians =

Australian live comedy magic show

The Naked Magicians Mike Tyler & Christopher Wayne
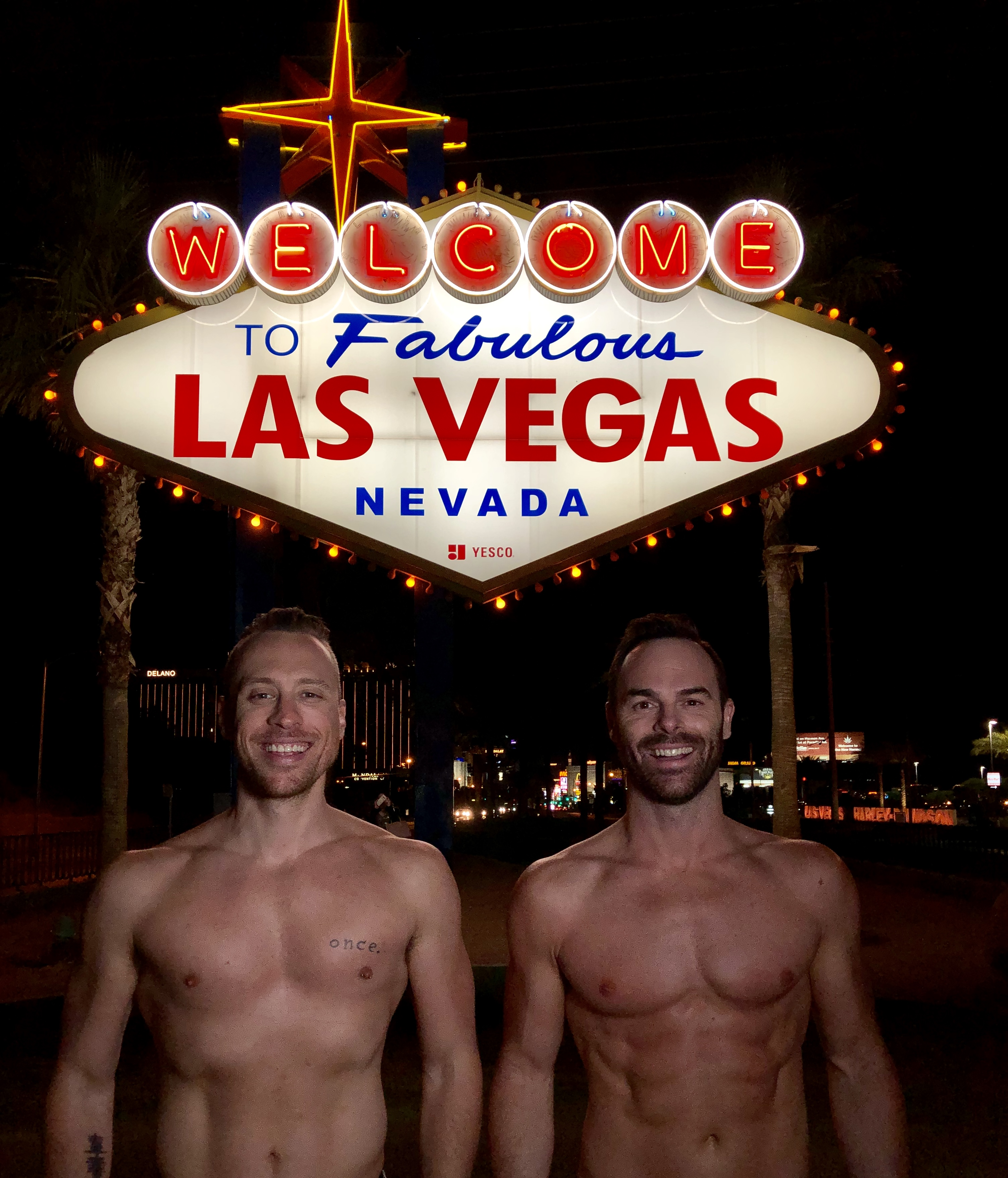
- Occupation: Comedic Magicians
- Website: www.nakedmagicians.com

The Naked Magicians is a live comedy magic show from Australia. The tagline for the show is "good magicians don’t need sleeves and great magicians don’t need pants", and show was created by Australian comedy magicians, Mike Tyler and Christopher Wayne, who perform it as a duo on-stage. The show is a mix of magic and comedy delivered by the magicians who slowly remove their clothing during the show until they are completely naked.

Premiering at Brisbane Comedy Festival in Feb 2014, the show began as an act at comedy festivals and fringe festivals in Australia and New Zealand. It has since performed in over 250 cities across Australia, New Zealand, UK, USA, Canada and Hong Kong. Its most notable shows include its season at Trafalgar Studios on London’s West End in 2016 and a four-month residency at MGM Grand in Las Vegas in 2019.

The show performed an act on the Judge Cuts round of Season 12 of America’s Got Talent. It also made appearances on E!News, Entertainment Tonight, and Access Hollywood.

The Naked Magicians have performed a 96-show residency at MGM Grand in Las Vegas, becoming the first all-Australian magic show in history with a residency on the Las Vegas strip.

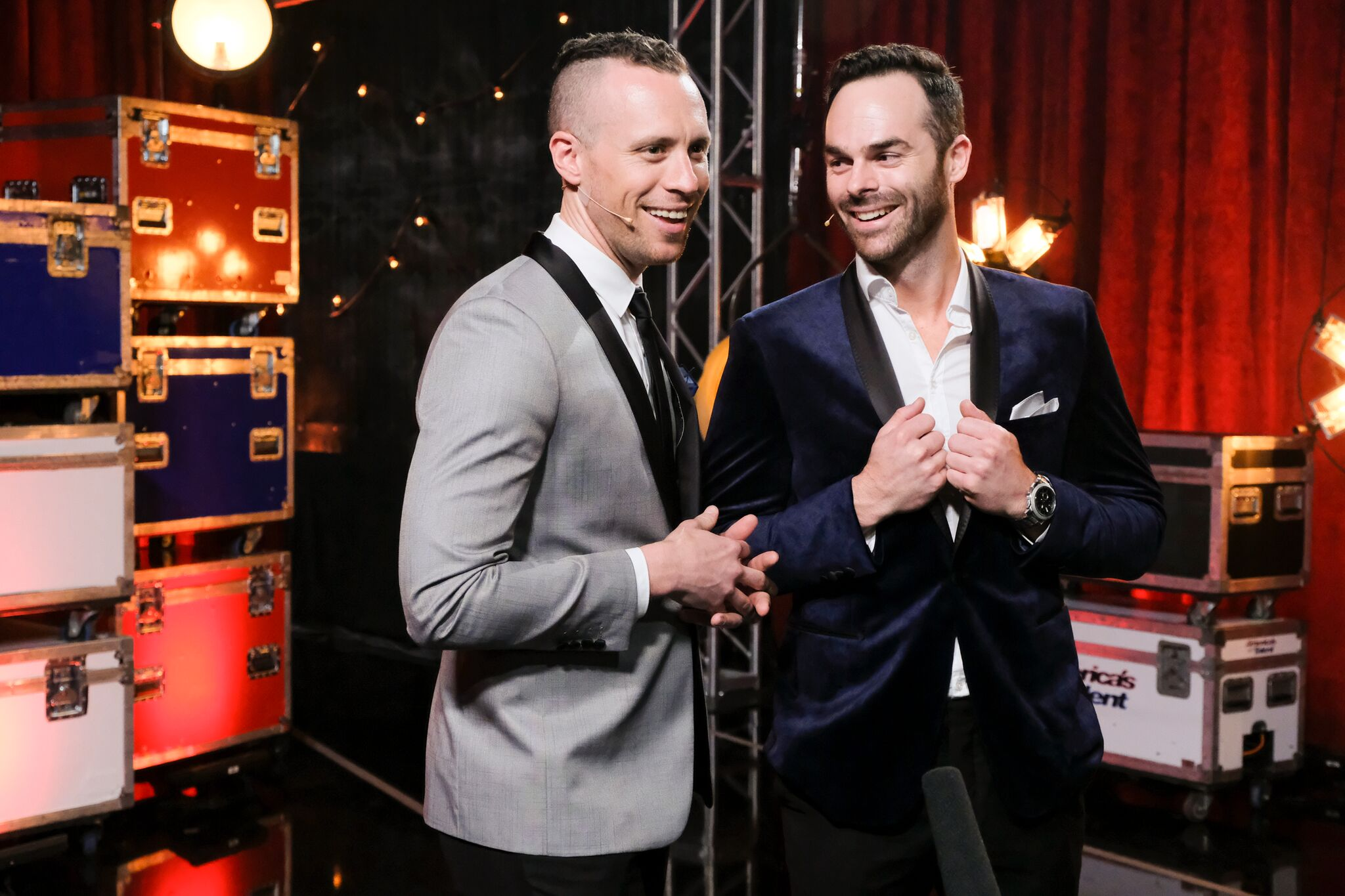
The Naked Magicians

On April 27, 2021, it was revealed that Christopher Wayne will be a housemate on Big Brother Australia Season 13 where he finished in 22nd place after being evicted on Day 12 after 9 days in the house.

== Festivals ==
- Perth World Fringe Festival (2015, 2018).
- Edinburgh Fringe Festival (2016 and 2017).
- Adelaide Fringe Festival (2014, 2015, 2016, 2018).
- New Zealand Comedy Festival (2015, 2018).
- Melbourne International Comedy Festiva (2015, 2018).
