= Big Brother (Australian TV series) season 13 =

Big Brother
- Season 13
- Presented by: Sonia Kruger
- No. of days: 63
- No. of housemates: 26
- Winner: Marley Biyendolo
- Runners-up: Christina Podolyan; Sarah Jane "SJ" Adams
- No. of episodes: 31

Release
- Original network: Seven Network
- Original release: 26 April – 29 June 2021

Additional information
- Filming dates: October 2020 – December 2020

Season chronology
- ← Previous; Season 12 Next → Season 14

The thirteenth season of the Australian reality television series Big Brother, also known as Big Brother 2021, began airing on 26 April 2021 on Seven Network. Sonia Kruger returned as host of the series. The concept for this season is More Than Meets the Eye.

This season revolved around strangers living in a house together with no communication with the outside world as they competed for $250,000. They were constantly filmed during their time in the house and were not permitted to communicate with those filming them. Over the course of the competition, housemates will compete in challenges for power and safety before voting each other out of the house. When three housemates remain, the Australian public decided which finalist would win the grand prize.

The series was filmed from October to December 2020 and aired from April to late June in the following year on Seven Network. The live finale was aired on 29 June 2021, where Marley Biyendolo was declared the winner and won a prize of $250,000 with Christina Podolyan and Sarah Jane "SJ" Adams being declared as the Runners-up. In addition, Biyendolo also won a prize of $10,000 after winning the challenge on Episode 26.

== Production ==
In June 2020, during the release of the twelfth season, it was announced that Big Brother Australia had been renewed for a thirteenth season set to air in 2021. As in the previous season, the show was pre-recorded and was filmed between October and December 2020. On 11 April Seven announced that the season would premiere on 26 April.

=== International broadcast ===
The season was broadcast in New Zealand online-only, via TVNZ OnDemand, starting 4 May 2021 with the first four episodes and each subsequent episodes being released within 48 hours of the Australian broadcast. This marked the return of the show to TVNZ after a 16-year absence following the conclusion of the 2005 season.

=== Impact of the COVID-19 pandemic ===
The live finale was impacted by the on-going pandemic, as the plan was to broadcast from Hordern Pavilion at Fox Studios in Randwick in front of an audience of 2,000 people with all 26 housemates in attendance. As the result of lockdowns announced on June 24, 2021, it was confirmed the following day that no audience would be in attendance for the finale. In addition, due to inter-state travel restrictions nine housemates opted to appear via video link despite an initial desire from Endemol Shine Australia to still have everyone appear in-person. Lillian Ahenkan, the second evictee of the series, did not participate in the finale as she was given the option to not attend in-person due to the lockdowns - but did not appear via video link like other housemates that were unable to attend in-person.

== Housemates ==
On 14 March 2021, Channel Seven revealed Sarah Jane Adams as the first housemate for the series. More housemates were revealed over the following weeks, with the full cast of the 20 original Housemates being introduced on 25 April. Among the Intruders, Brenton was revealed in pre-show material, whilst the other 5 intruders were revealed on 15 May, a few days before their introduction on the show on Episode 12.

Two pre-existing relationships were a part of the game in a minor twist: Max and Katie are ex-boyfriend and girlfriend and intruders Alex and Charlotte M are twin sisters. Other than the personal effects of their relationships, there was no direct effect on the mechanics of the game.

Name	Age on entry	Hometown	Day entered	Day exited	Result
Marley Biyendolo	25	Melbourne, Victoria	4	63	Winner
Christina Podolyan	21	Melbourne, Victoria	1	63	Runner-up
Sarah Jane "SJ" Adams	65	Sydney, New South Wales	1	63	Runner-up
Ari Kimber	22	Sydney, New South Wales	4	63	Evicted
Daniel "Danny" Hayes	48	Geelong, Victoria	1	62	Evicted
Sid Pattni	34	Perth, Western Australia (originally from the United Kingdom)	1	61	Evicted
Adriana Fernandez	53	Wollongong, New South Wales	27	60	Evicted
Tilly Whitfeld	20	Sydney, New South Wales	4	58	Evicted
Charlotte McCristal	25	Melbourne, Victoria	27	51	Evicted
Mary Kalifatidis	55	Melbourne, Victoria	4	50	Evicted
Jessica "Jess" Trend	29	Melbourne, Victoria	4	45	Evicted
Brenton Balicki	31	Sydney, New South Wales	27	42	Evicted
Mitchell "Mitch" Giles	26	Perth, Western Australia	27	40	Evicted
Gabriel "Gabe" Criste	27	Brisbane, Queensland	27	33	Walked
Charlotte Hall	23	Brisbane, Queensland	4	33	Evicted
Alexandra "Alex" McCristal	25	Melbourne, Victoria	27	32	Evicted
Katie Williams	26	Sydney, New South Wales	1	26	Evicted
Melissa McGorman	33	Cambrai, South Australia	1	24	Evicted
Nicholas "Nick" Benton	29	Adelaide, South Australia	1	22	Evicted
Mitchell Spencer	26	Cairns, Queensland	1	19	Evicted
Carlos Castro	39	Perth, Western Australia (originally from Colombia)	1	16	Evicted
Christopher Wayne	37	Brisbane, Queensland	4	12	Evicted
Michael Brown	29	Perth, Western Australia	4	10	Evicted
Renata Bubeniene	45	Adelaide, South Australia	1	7	Evicted
Lillian Ahenkan	26	Sydney, New South Wales	1	5	Evicted
Max Beattie	28	Gold Coast, Queensland	1	3	Evicted

=== Future appearances ===
Daniel Hayes competed in Big Brother: VIP. He was the fourth housemate to be evicted from the house. In 2022, Marley Biyendolo competed on The Challenge: Australia.

== Episodes ==
No. overall	No. in season	Title	Timeline	Original release date
Week 1
1560	1	Episode 1	Day 1–3	26 April 2021
Twelve housemates enter the Big Brother house. Daniel is given a secret mission to take another housemate, Nick, to Big Brother's Boiler room and be immune from the first eviction. While they are away, their Housemates compete in the first Nominations Challenge to retrieve and stack 17 eye-shaped blocks between 2 posts in the ground. On their return, they are shocked to find that they are the only ones allowed to cast votes in the eviction.
1561	2	Episode 2	Day 4–5	27 April 2021
Big Brother gives Melissa a secret mission to hide sheep of different sizes around the House. Later that night, eight new Housemates board BB Air on a 24-hour flight before they enter the house. The next day, the current housemates participate in a Nominations Challenge in which they must balance on progressively smaller hanging balls. After the eviction, the new Housemates are released into the House.
1562	3	Episode 3	Day 6–8	28 April 2021
Big Brother placed thousands of balloons in the house. Inside of eighteen of them were golden cinema tickets. If the housemates find a balloon with a ticket, Big Brother would award them a movie night. The next day, the housemates had to hold on to a rope attached to a bar weighing 30% of each housemate's body weight. If the housemates drop the rope, they would be eliminated from the challenge. The last housemate standing would win the challenge.
Week 2
1563	4	Episode 4	Day 9–10	2 May 2021
It's the beginning of Surprise week, and Big Brother wakes the Housemates by playing Walking on Sunshine into the House. Nick goes on the offensive, targeting the divide between the originals and those who came on the plane. In the House Task, Housemates must perform a rendition of the song while putting their hands in boxes of critters and other items designed to distract them. The housemates deal with low food levels, eating only spinach straight from the bag, tinned tuna and Mary's pumpkin soup. The nominations challenge features two teams of Housemates in a series of battles of strength, pushing a platform to the end of a rail. The team that wins three times winning the challenge overall and collectively winning the nomination power. At the eviction, Daniel says that it is a coincidence that only Housemates from the plane got nominated. Tilly bares her heart and rattles off all the things she's learnt about all her other Housemates.
1564	5	Episode 5	Day 11–12	3 May 2021
Surprise Week continues in the House, and some Housemates have decided to make their own surprises on each other. Daniel decides to sneak up on Katie and scare her out of bed, while Jess and Marley frighten Christina as she enters the small lounge room. In the house task, Housemates are to ignore anything out of the ordinary that happens in the House, such as spider webs in the Diary Room or surprise visitors, to receive a meal from KFC. In the Nominations Challenge, the housemates work in pairs to balance 10 balls on one end of a seesaw. In the eviction room, Sarah Jane says she's learning about the strategy of the game now. Christopher says that he is going for the Housemates who are going after him.
1565	6	Episode 6	Day 13–14	4 May 2021
Big Brother calls Charlotte to the Diary Room, asks her to choose a fellow Housemate to give a makeover, so she chooses Nick. Charlotte, with Ari's help, styles Nick in different outfits. Meanwhile, the Housemates are losing their patience over the food rations. In the House Task, Housemates must help test a new security system for Big Brother. When an alarm sounds, the Housemate indicated on the screen in the living room must press the button to disable it before time runs out. Each alarm disabled earns AU$10 for the upcoming shopping. After 12 hours, the house receives a total of $220 in the challenge. The nominations challenge requires pairs of Housemates to stand on a sloped apparatus by distributing their weight using a rope.
1566	7	Episode 7	Day 15–16	5 May 2021
Week 3
1567	8	Episode 8	Day 18–19	9 May 2021
1568	9	Episode 9	Day 20–21	10 May 2021
1569	10	Episode 10	Day 22–24	11 May 2021
1570	11	Episode 11	Day 25–26	12 May 2021
Week 4
1571	12	Episode 12	Day 27–28	17 May 2021
1572	13	Episode 13	Day 29–30	18 May 2021
1573	14	Episode 14	Day 31–32	19 May 2021
Week 5
1574	15	Episode 15	Day 32–33	24 May 2021
1575	16	Episode 16	Day 34–37	25 May 2021
1576	17	Episode 17	Day 38–40	26 May 2021
Week 6
1574	18	Episode 18	Day 41–42	31 May 2021
1575	19	Episode 19	Day 43–45	1 June 2021
1576	20	Episode 20	Day 46–47	2 June 2021
Week 7
1578	21	Episode 21	Day 48–50	7 June 2021
1579	22	Episode 22	Day 51	8 June 2021
1580	23	Episode 23	Day 52–53	9 June 2021
Week 8
1581	24	Episode 24	Day 54–55	14 June 2021
1582	25	Episode 25	Day 56–57	15 June 2021
1583	26	Episode 26	Day 58	16 June 2021
Week 9
1584	27	Episode 27	Day 59–60	21 June 2021
1585	28	Episode 28	Day 61	22 June 2021
1585	29	Episode 29	Day 62	23 June 2021
Week 10
1585	30	Episode 30	Day 63	28 June 2021
1585	31	Episode 31 – Finale	N/A	29 June 2021

== Voting history ==
This housemate was nominated for eviction.
This housemate won the Challenge on this round.
This housemate was immune from this round of eviction.
This housemate was not in the Main House and did not participate in this round of eviction.
This housemate was originally nominated but was saved from eviction.

	Week 1			Week 2					Week 3				Week 4			Week 5			Week 6			Week 7			Week 8			Week 9			Week 10		
Episode	1	2	3	4	5	6		7	8	9	10	11	12	13	14	15	16	17	18	19	20	21	22	23	24	25	26	27	28	29	30	Finale	
Challenge Winner(s)	Renata	Melissa	Jess	Blue Team	Melissa; Tilly	Christina; Daniel		Tilly	Tilly	Katie	Ari	Daniel; Marley	Mitch	Brenton	Mitch	Mitch; Marley	Tilly	Tilly	Red Team	Christina	Ari; Christina	Marley	Tilly	Daniel	Sid	~~Christina~~; Adriana	Marley	Daniel	Christina	Ari; Christina	Marley	(none)	
Nominations	Christina; Max; Melissa	Katie; Lillian; SJ	Melissa; Renata; Sid	Mary; Michael; Tilly	Charlotte H Christopher; SJ	Mary; SJ; Sid	Mary; Sid	Carlos; Charlotte H Jess	Mitchell; SJ; Sid	Ari; Melissa; Nick	Daniel; Marley; Melissa	Ari; Charlotte H Katie	Adriana; Alex; Brenton; Charlotte M Gabe	Alex; Charlotte M Gabe	~~Ari~~; Charlotte H Gabe	Adriana; Ari; Christina	Ari; Brenton; Mitch	**Brenton**; Christina; Mitch	Brenton; Christina; SJ	~~Ari~~; Jess; SJ	Marley; Mary; SJ	Ari; Christina; Mary	Adriana; **Charlotte M** Christina	Daniel; Marley; SJ	Daniel; Marley; Tilly	Ari; Marley; SJ	(none)	Adriana; Christina; ~~SJ~~	Ari; ~~Daniel~~; Sid	Daniel; SJ	Ari; Christina; SJ	(none)	
Marley	Not in House	BB Air	Renata	Tilly	Charlotte H	Sid	Sid	Carlos	Mitchell	Nick	Melissa	Nominating; Housemate	Gabe	Gabe	Charlotte H	Nominating; Housemate	Brenton	Brenton	Brenton	SJ	SJ	Nominating; Housemate	Christina	Nominated	Daniel	Ari	No voting	Adriana	Ari	SJ	Ari	**Winner** (Finale)	
Christina	Nominated	Lillian	Renata	Michael	Christopher	Nominating; Housemate	Mary	Carlos	Mitchell	Nick	Daniel	Katie	Adriana	Gabe	Gabe	Adriana	Halfway; House	Mitch	SJ	Nominating; Housemate	Nominating; Housemate	Mary	Charlotte M	Sarah Jane	Tilly	SJ	No voting	Nominated	Nominating; Housemate	Daniel	Nominated	**Runner-up** (Finale)	
SJ	Ineligible	Lillian	Renata	Tilly	Christopher	Mary	In Attic		Mitchell	Nick	Melissa	Katie	Adriana	Gabe	Gabe	Christina	Mitch	Mitch	Brenton	Nominated	Marley	Mary	Charlotte M	Nominated	~~Marley~~	Ari	No voting	Adriana	Sid	Nominated	Nominated	**Runner-up** (Finale)	
Ari	Not in House	BB Air	Renata	Michael	Christopher	SJ	Mary	Carlos	Mitchell	Nick	Nominating; Housemate	Katie	Adriana	Gabe	Not eligible	Christina	Mitch	Mitch	Brenton	Not eligible	Nominating; Housemate	Mary	Charlotte M	Marley	Tilly	SJ	In Mirrored Room	Adriana	Nominated	Daniel	Nominated	Evicted (Day 63)	
Daniel	**Max**	Lillian	Sid	Michael	Christopher	Nominating; Housemate	Mary	Jess	SJ	Medically; Isolating	Melissa	Nominating; Housemate	Adriana	Alex	Charlotte H	Christina	Mitch	Mitch	Christina	Jess	Marley	Mary	Charlotte M	Nominated	~~Marley~~	Ari	No voting	Nominating; Housemate	Sid	Nominated	Evicted (Day 62)		
Sid	Ineligible	Lillian	Renata	Tilly	Charlotte H	SJ	Nominated	Carlos	Mitchell	Nick	Melissa	Katie	Gabe	Gabe	Gabe	Christina	Brenton	Mitch	Brenton	Jess	SJ	Christina	Christina	Marley	Nominating; Housemate	Ari	No voting	Adriana	Nominated	Evicted (Day 61)			
Adriana	Not in House												Nominated	Gabe	Gabe	Christina	Mitch	Mitch	Sarah Jane	Jess	Marley	Mary	Charlotte M	SJ	Tilly	Nominating; Housemate	No voting	Nominated	Evicted (Day 60)				
Tilly	Not in House	BB Air	Renata	Michael	Nominating; Housemate	SJ	Sid	Nominating; Housemate	Nominating; Housemate	Melissa	Melissa	Katie	Gabe	Alex	Charlotte H	Ari	Nominating; Housemate	Nominating; Housemate	Brenton	SJ	SJ	Christina	Nominating; Housemate	Marley	Daniel	In Mirrored Room		Evicted (Day 58)					
Charlotte M	Not in House												Nominated		Charlotte H	Ari	Brenton	Brenton	Brenton	SJ	SJ	Christina	Christina	Evicted (Day 51)									
Mary	Not in House	BB Air	Renata	Michael	Charlotte H	SJ	Nominated	In Attic	Mitchell	Nick	Melissa	Charlotte H	Adriana	Gabe	Gabe	Christina	Mitch	Mitch	Brenton	Jess	SJ	Christina	Evicted (Day 50)										
Jess	Not in House	BB Air	Nominating; Housemate	Tilly	Charlotte H	SJ	Sid	Carlos	Mitchell	Nick	Melissa	Ari	Adriana	Alex	Charlotte H	Christina	Brenton	Brenton	Brenton	Nominated	Evicted (Day 45)												
Brenton	Not in House												Nominated	Intruder; Winner	Charlotte H	Adriana	Mitch	Mitch	SJ	Evicted (Day 42)													
Mitch	Not in House												Intruder; Winner	Alex	Nominating; Housemate	Nominating; Housemate	Brenton	Brenton	Evicted (Day 40)														
Gabe	Not in House												Nominated		Nominated	Walked (Day 33)																	
Charlotte H	Not in House	BB Air	Renata	Michael	Christopher	SJ	Sid	Carlos	Mitchell	Nick	Melissa	Katie	Adriana	Gabe	Nominated	Evicted (Day 33)																	
Alex	Not in House												Nominated		Evicted (Day 32)																		
Katie	Ineligible	Lillian	Renata	Tilly	Charlotte H	Sid	Sid	Carlos	Mitchell	Nominating; Housemate	Melissa	Ari	Evicted (Day 26)																				
Melissa	Nominated	Nominating; Housemate	Renata	Michael	Nominating; Housemate	SJ	Mary	Jess	SJ	Nick	Daniel	Evicted (Day 24)																					
Nick	Abstained	Lillian	Renata	Michael	Christopher	Mary	Mary	Charlotte H	SJ	Ari	Evicted (Day 22)																						
Mitchell	Ineligible	Lillian	Renata	Michael	Christopher	SJ	Mary	Jess	Sarah Jane	Evicted (Day 19)																							
Carlos	Ineligible	Katie	Melissa	Tilly	Christopher	Mary	Mary	Jess	Evicted (Day 16)																								
Christopher	Not in House	BB Air	Renata	Tilly	Charlotte H	Evicted (Day 12)																											
Michael	Not in House	BB Air	Renata	Tilly	Evicted (Day 10)																												
Renata	Nominating; Housemate	Katie	Sid	Evicted (Day 7)																													
Lillian	Ineligible	SJ	Evicted (Day 5)																														
Max	Nominated	Evicted (Day 3)																															
Notes	(Note: Daniel entered the Diary Room first and was tasked to win immunity for himself and another Housemate. The mission was to hide in the Boiler Room until the first Eviction. He chose Nick, and the pair completed the mission. Daniel & Nick returned to the house at the Eviction Ceremony, where they were given the only two votes for the eviction, with an option to abstain from voting. Had both abstained, no one would be evicted. Daniel cast the only vote to evict Max.)	(Note: 8 New Housemates spent 24 Hours completing the BBAir Task and entered the main house after Lillian's Eviction.)	None	(Note: This was a Team Challenge. The Winning Team collectively held the power to nominate. All housemates cast votes in the Eviction.)	(Note: This was a Pairs Challenge. The winning pair had to agree on nominations.)	(Note: Due to the odd number of Housemates for a Pairs Challenge, the Housemate indicated by was randomly drawn to not participate and receive Immunity.) (Note: This was a Fake Double Eviction. Following SJ's eviction, a second vote between surviving nominees Sid & Mary was held. As their votes would cancel the others out, Sid & Mary did not vote in this vote. After being voted out, SJ & Mary secretly moved to the Attic & returned following Carlos's eviction.)	(Note: As the vote was tied, the nominating housemate cast a tie-break vote.)		None	(Note: After falling ill, Dan was isolated from the other Housemates & tested for Covid-19. As he missed the Nomination Challenge & the Eviction Ceremony, he was ineligible to be evicted and to vote.)	None		(Note: On Episode 12, 6 Intruders entered the game. During Episodes 12 & 13, the Intruders competed in Two Intruder Challenges & Two House Votes (where the Original Housemates would vote for an Intruder to stay) to determine which 4 would stay in the game.)		(Note: After the 2nd Intruder Vote, Big Brother gave Alex & Charlotte M a final chance to enter the game with a Challenge.) (Note: Ari was originally nominated. However, as his challenge build was faulty, Big Brother voided his Nomination (as he was unable to win). In exchange for his safety, Ari did not vote. The eviction continued with Charlotte H & Gabe nominated, with the nominees not voting as their votes would cancel the others out.) (Note: After Episode 14's Eviction, Gabe quit the game.)	(Note: This was a Walking Dead Vote. Housemates voted to be the Walking Dead Housemates were exiled in the Halfway House until the end of the week, where Three Walking Dead Housemates are facing an Eviction Vote.)		(Note: The winner of this Challenge won the power to directly name the Final Walking Dead Housemate, Nominating them for that night's Walking Dead Eviction. This Nomination is indicated in Bold.)		(Note: As the Housemate who did not enter the Panic Room Task, Big Brother gave Dan the key to a secret Bunker. He could give the key to a nominee, allowing them to hide for the Eviction, vetoing their Nomination. Dan gave the key to Ari. As he was hidden, Ari did not vote. The eviction continued with Jess & SJ nominated, with the nominees not voting as their votes would cancel the others out.)	(Note: This was a Fake Eviction. The Housemate with the most votes would instead, become Head of House, along with another Housemate of their choice. SJ selected Daniel. The HoH position included Immunity for the duration of their reign as well as other perks & privileges revealed during their reign.)		(Note: Heads of House SJ & Daniel had the power to nominate the 3rd Nomination. This Nomination is indicated in Bold)	(Note: Episode 23 was not an Eviction Episode. Instead, the Challenge Winner & Two Nominees of their choice were Nominated for a special vote to receive a Game Advantage called The Eye - The Eye allowed the holder to cancel the votes against a nominee at one of the Next Two Evictions. Marley was voted to receive The Eye and used it on himself on Episode 24's Vote.)	(Note: Episodes 24 and 25 were both fake eviction episodes with both evictees (Tilly and Ari) being secretly sent to the Mirror Room upon being voted off. In Episode 26, Tilly & Ari participated in a Russian Roulette game to determine which of the two would officially be evicted.)	(Note: SJ won a Replay Advantage in Episode 25's Task - allowing her to nullify the results of a Nomination Challenge and force everyone to replay the Challenge. Christina won the first run of the challenge, before SJ used the replay. Adriana won the second run of the challenge and won the Nomination Power.)	(Note: In this episode's challenge, the housemates were competing to win a $10,000 prize instead of the power to nominate.)	(Note: For the Final Week of the Game, the Three Nominated Housemates were given a chance to save themselves in a Veto Showdown Challenge. The winner of this challenge (represented by ~~strikethrough~~) would veto their nomination and would not face the House's Vote. This would leave two nominees for the House's Vote, with the nominees not voting as their votes would cancel the others out.)			(Note: The winner of Final Challenge won their place in the Final as well as the sole vote at the Final Eviction. The other three housemates were nominated for the Final Eviction.)	(Note: For the finale, Australia voted for the winner of the thirteenth season and the $250,000 grand prize.)	
Source																								(none)			(none)					(none)	
Walked	none														**Gabe**	none																	
Evicted	**Max**; 1 of 2 votes to evict	**Lillian**; 7 of 10 votes to evict	**Renata**; 14 of 17 votes to evict	**Michael**; 9 of 17 votes to evict	**Christopher**; 8 of 14 votes to evict	**SJ**; 8 of 13 votes to fake evict	**Mary**; 6 of 11 votes to fake evict	**Carlos**; 7 of 12 votes to evict	**Mitchell**; 9 of 13 votes to evict	**Nick**; 9 of 11 votes to evict	**Melissa**; 9 of 11 votes to evict	**Katie**; 6 of 9 votes to evict	**Alex**; **Brenton**; **Charlotte M** 0 of 10 votes to enter each	**Charlotte M** 0 of 12 votes to enter	**Alex**; Lost Final; Intruder Challenge	**Christina**; 7 of 11 votes to be a Walking Dead	**Mitch**; 6 of 11 votes to be a Walking Dead	**Brenton**; Tilly's choice to be a Walking Dead	**Brenton**; 8 of 12 votes to evict	**Jess**; 4 of 7 votes to evict	**SJ**; 5 of 8 votes to fake evict	**Mary**; 5 of 9 votes to evict	**Charlotte M** 5 of 8 votes to evict	**Marley**; 3 of 5 votes to receive The Eye	**Tilly**; 3 of 7 votes to fake evict	**Ari**; 4 of 6 votes to fake evict	**Tilly**; Lost; Challenge	**Adriana**; 4 of 4 votes to evict	**Sid**; 2 of 3 votes to evict	**Daniel**; 2 of 3 votes to evict	**Ari**; Marley's choice to evict	**SJ**; Fewest votes to win	**Christina**; Fewest votes to win
Evicted	**Max**; 1 of 2 votes to evict	**Lillian**; 7 of 10 votes to evict	**Renata**; 14 of 17 votes to evict	**Michael**; 9 of 17 votes to evict	**Christopher**; 8 of 14 votes to evict	**SJ**; 8 of 13 votes to fake evict	**Mary**; 6 of 11 votes to fake evict	**Carlos**; 7 of 12 votes to evict	**Mitchell**; 9 of 13 votes to evict	**Nick**; 9 of 11 votes to evict	**Melissa**; 9 of 11 votes to evict	**Katie**; 6 of 9 votes to evict	**Gabe**; 3 of 10 votes to enter	**Alex**; 4 of 12 votes to enter	**Charlotte H** 6 of 11 votes to evict	**Christina**; 7 of 11 votes to be a Walking Dead	**Mitch**; 6 of 11 votes to be a Walking Dead	**Mitch**; 8 of 12 votes to evict	**Brenton**; 8 of 12 votes to evict	**Jess**; 4 of 7 votes to evict	**SJ**; 5 of 8 votes to fake evict	**Mary**; 5 of 9 votes to evict	**Charlotte M** 5 of 8 votes to evict	**Marley**; 3 of 5 votes to receive The Eye	**Tilly**; 3 of 7 votes to fake evict	**Ari**; 4 of 6 votes to fake evict	**Tilly**; Lost; Challenge	**Adriana**; 4 of 4 votes to evict	**Sid**; 2 of 3 votes to evict	**Daniel**; 2 of 3 votes to evict	**Ari**; Marley's choice to evict	**SJ**; Fewest votes to win	**Christina**; Fewest votes to win
Saved	**Christina**; 0 of 2 votes to evict	**Katie**; 2 of 10 votes to evict	**Sid**; 2 of 17 votes to evict	**Tilly**; 8 of 17 votes to evict	**Charlotte H** 6 of 14 votes to evict	**Mary**; 3 of 13 votes to fake evict	**Sid**; 5 of 11 votes to fake evict	**Jess**; 4 of 12 votes to evict	**SJ**; 4 of 13 votes to evict	**Ari**; 1 of 11 votes to evict	**Daniel**; 2 of 11 votes to evict	**Ari**; 2 of 9 votes to evict	**Mitch**; Won Intruder; Challenge	**Brenton**; Won Intruder; Challenge	**Charlotte M** Won Intruder; Challenge	**Adriana**; 2 of 11 votes to be a Walking Dead	**Brenton**; 5 of 11 votes to be a Walking Dead	**Brenton**; 4 of 12 votes to evict	**SJ**; 3 of 12 votes to evict	**SJ**; 3 of 7 votes to evict	**Marley**; 3 of 8 votes to fake evict	**Christina**; 4 of 9 votes to evict	**Christina**; 3 of 8 votes to evict	**SJ**; 2 of 5 votes to receive The Eye	**Daniel**; 2 of 7 votes to fake evict	**SJ**; 2 of 6 votes to fake evict	**Ari**; Won; Challenge	**Christina**; 0 of 4 votes to evict	**Ari**; 1 of 3 votes to evict	**SJ**; 1 of 3 votes to evict	**Christina**; Marley's choice to save	**Marley**; Most votes to win	
Saved	**Melissa**; 0 of 2 votes to evict	**SJ**; 1 of 10 votes to evict	**Melissa**; 1 of 17 votes to evict	**Mary**; 0 of 17 votes to evict	**SJ**; 0 of 14 votes to evict	**Sid**; 2 of 13 votes to fake evict	**Sid**; 5 of 11 votes to fake evict	**Charlotte H** 1 of 12 votes to evict	**Sid**; 0 of 13 votes to evict	**Melissa**; 1 of 11 votes to evict	**Marley**; 0 of 11 votes to evict	**Charlotte H** 1 of 9 votes to evict	**Adriana**; 7 of 10 votes to enter	**Gabe**; 8 of 12 votes to enter	**Gabe**; 5 of 11 votes to evict	**Ari**; 2 of 11 votes to be a Walking Dead	**Ari**; 0 of 11 votes to be a Walking Dead	**Christina**; 0 of 12 votes to evict	**Christina**; 1 of 12 votes to evict	**SJ**; 3 of 7 votes to evict	**Mary**; 0 of 8 votes to fake evict	**Ari**; 0 of 9 votes to evict	**Adriana**; 0 of 8 votes to evict	**Daniel**; 0 of 5 votes to receive The Eye	**Marley**; 2 of 7 votes Nullified	**Marley**; 0 of 6 votes to fake evict	**Ari**; Won; Challenge	**Christina**; 0 of 4 votes to evict	**Ari**; 1 of 3 votes to evict	**SJ**; 1 of 3 votes to evict	**SJ**; Marley's choice to save	**Marley**; Most votes to win	

== Reception ==
=== Ratings ===
Ratings data is from OzTAM and represents the viewership from the 5 largest Australian metropolitan centres (Sydney, Melbourne, Brisbane, Perth and Adelaide).

Wk	Ep	Air date	Timeslot	Segment	Overnight ratings		Consolidated ratings		Total ratings		Ref(s)
Wk	Ep	Air date	Timeslot	Segment	Viewers	Rank	Viewers	Rank	Viewers	Rank	Ref(s)
1	1	26 April 2021	Monday 7:30pm	Arrival	664,000	8	94,000	2	758,000	7	
1	1	26 April 2021	Monday 7:30pm	Episode	662,000	9	74,000	3	736,000	8	
1	1	26 April 2021	Monday 7:30pm	Eviction	650,000	10	73,000	4	723,000	9	
1	2	27 April 2021	Tuesday 7:30pm		622,000	9	66,000	6	690,000	8	
1	3	28 April 2021	Wednesday 7:30pm		558,000	11	65,000	4	623,000	10	
2	4	2 May 2021	Sunday 7:00pm		534,000	6	67,000	5	590,000	7	
2	5	3 May 2021	Monday 7:30pm		552,000	13	71,000	5	623,000	11	
2	6	4 May 2021	Tuesday 7:30pm		515,000	14	63,000	6	578,000	11	
2	7	5 May 2021	Wednesday 7:30pm		556,000	10	47,000	7	604,000	10	
3	8	9 May 2021	Sunday 7:00pm		531,000	6	71,000	6	602,000	7	
3	9	10 May 2021	Monday 7:30pm		638,000	9	56,000	6	694,000	8	
3	10	11 May 2021	Tuesday 7:30pm		558,000	10	52,000	5	610,000	10	
3	11	12 May 2021	Wednesday 7:30pm		562,000	10	54,000	6	616,000	9	
4	12	17 May 2021	Monday 7:30pm		592,000	11	63,000	5	655,000	10	
4	13	18 May 2021	Tuesday 7:30pm		583,000	7	79,000	5	662,000	6	
4	14	19 May 2021	Wednesday 7:30pm		539,000	13	73,000	4	612,000	9	
5	15	24 May 2021	Monday 7:30pm		591,000	13	81,000	3	671,000	9	
5	16	25 May 2021	Tuesday 7:30pm		575,000	10	83,000	5	658,000	8	
5	17	26 May 2021	Wednesday 7:30pm		558,000	14	88,000	4	646,000	9	
6	18	31 May 2021	Monday 7:30pm		590,000	14	67,000	3	657,000	12	
6	19	1 June 2021	Tuesday 7:30pm		583,000	10	75,000	5	657,000	9	
6	20	2 June 2021	Wednesday 7:30pm		602,000	10	80,000	3	682,000	9	
7	21	7 June 2021	Monday 7:30pm		620,000	8	56,000	4	676,000	9	
7	22	8 June 2021	Tuesday 7:30pm		569,000	13	74,000	3	643,000	9	
7	23	9 June 2021	Wednesday 7:30pm		510,000	15	100,000	1	610,000	9	
8	24	14 June 2021	Monday 7:30pm		568,000	17	74,000	2	642,000	14	
8	25	15 June 2021	Tuesday 7:30pm		617,000	9	66,000	5	683,000	9	
8	26	16 June 2021	Wednesday 7:30pm		597,000	12	72,000	3	670,000	9	
9	27	21 June 2021	Monday 7:30pm		613,000	12	63,000	3	675,000	11	
9	28	22 June 2021	Tuesday 7:30pm		568,000	10	63,000	5	631,000	9	
9	29	23 June 2021	Wednesday 7:30pm		652,000	8	53,000	4	705,000	8	
10	30	28 June 2021	Monday 7:30pm		667,000	8	20,000	9	687,000	13	
10	31	29 June 2021	Tuesday 7:30pm	Finale	672,000	8	20,000	7	701,000	8	
10	31	29 June 2021	Tuesday 7:30pm	Winner Announced	726,000	7	14,000	8	804,000	6	

=== Accolades ===
Year	Award	Category	Nominee(s)	Result	Ref.
2022	TV Tonight Awards: Worst of 2021	Worst Australian Show	Big Brother	Nominated	

== Controversy ==
=== Alleged game rigging from production ===
This season of Big Brother has several alleged instances of the production team favouring game events for particular Housemates, including Daniel. One alleged incident is that of the Panic Room task in Episode 19. The alleged incident reported that Daniel wanted to enter the room early in the task, before being asked to go to the Diary Room. After the Diary Room visit, Daniel requested to go last (the position that would be awarded a secret game power).
