= Jess Trend =

Australian rules footballer

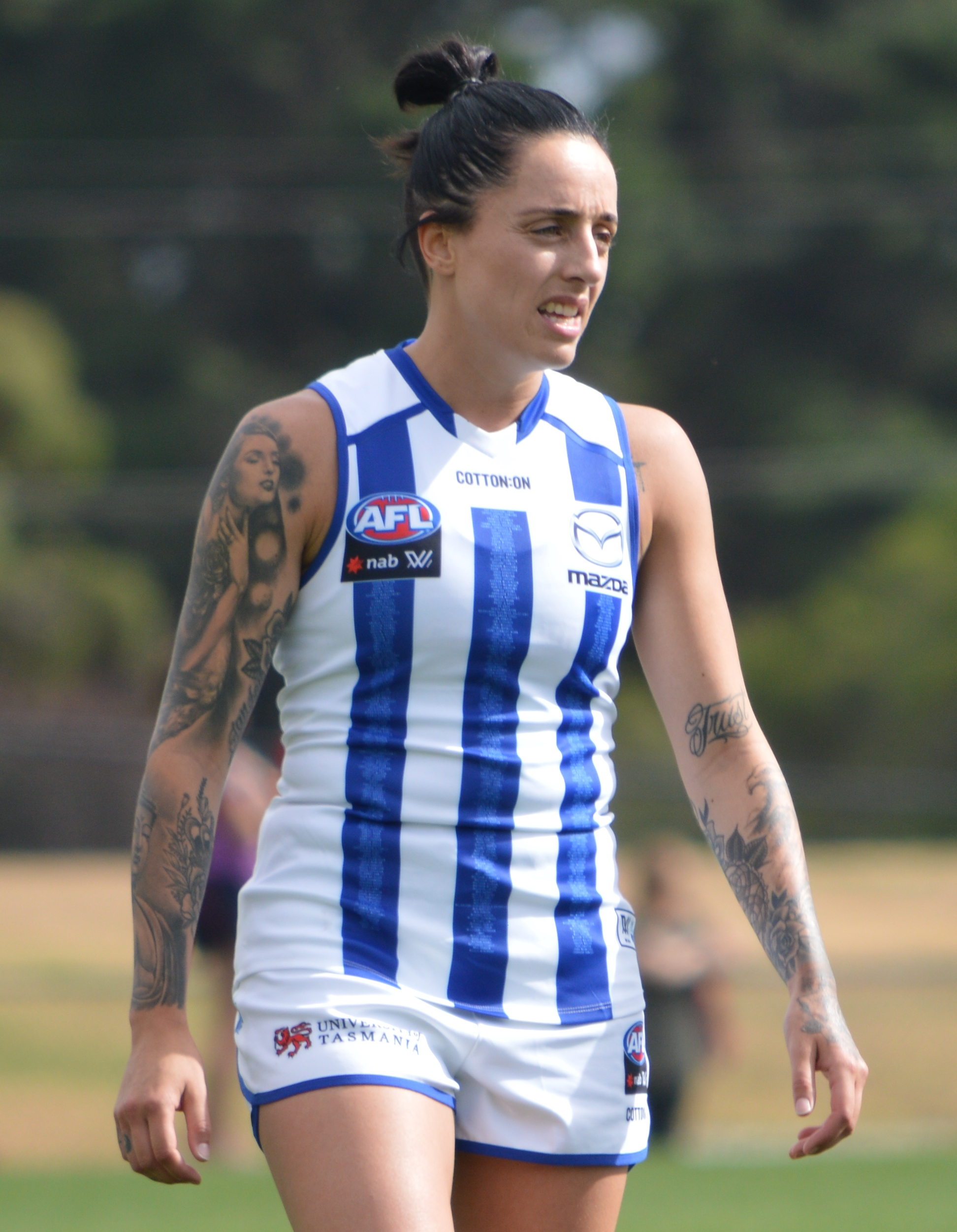
- Trend with North Melbourne in January 2019

Personal information
- Full name: Jessica Trend
- Born: 1 July 1991 (age 35)
- Original team: Essendon (VFLW)
- Debut: Round 1, 2019, North Melbourne vs. Carlton, at North Hobart Oval
- Height: 164 cm (5 ft 5 in)
- Position: Midfielder

Playing career^{1}
Years	Club	Games (Goals)
2019–2020	North Melbourne	14 (1)
2021	Fremantle	0 (0)
Total		14 (1)
- ^{1} Playing statistics correct to the end of the 2021 season.

Jessica Trend (born 1 July 1991) is an Australian rules footballer who played for North Melbourne in the AFL Women's (AFLW) competition. She was also part of Fremantle's squad for a season, but was on the inactive list and didn't play. She also appeared as a contestant in the 2021 Big Brother Australia Season 13.

== AFLW career ==
=== North Melbourne ===
Trend was signed by North Melbourne as a free agent during the expansion club signing period in 2018. She made her debut in the club's inaugural match, a 36-point victory over Carlton at North Hobart Oval in the opening round of the 2019 season.

=== Fremantle/Hawthorn VFLW ===
In the AFL trade period in August 2020, ahead of the 2021 season, Trend was traded to Fremantle. Later that year however Trend was placed on an inactive list to pursue non-football related opportunities and so returned to Victoria. She joined Hawthorn in the VFL Women's (VFLW) competition and was made captain of the club for the 2021 season. At the end of the 2021 season, she was delisted by Fremantle.

On April 27, 2021, it was revealed that Trend would be a housemate on the 2021 season of Big Brother Australia where she finished in 11th place after being evicted on day 45 after 41 days in the house.
