= Big Brother (Australian TV series) season 12 =

Season of Big Brother Australia

Big Brother
- Season 12
- Presented by: Sonia Kruger
- No. of days: 39
- No. of housemates: 20
- Winner: Chad Hurst
- Runners-up: Sophie Budack; Daniel Gorringe
- No. of episodes: 21 (+ 7 Eye Spy)

Release
- Original network: Seven Network
- Original release: 8 June – 22 July 2020

Additional information
- Filming dates: 21 February – 30 March 2020

Season chronology
- ← Previous; Season 11 Next → Season 13

The twelfth season of the Australian reality television series Big Brother, also known as Big Brother 2020, began airing on 8 June 2020. It was the first season of the show to air on the Seven Network after it bought the rights to the series in 2019, following a six-year absence. The show was originally screened on Network Ten from 2001 to 2008, then the Nine Network from 2012 to 2014. Sonia Kruger returned as the host of the show. Production was uniquely disrupted by the COVID-19 pandemic, forcing a temporary filming lockdown due to a crew member's exposure, an unprecedented format break to inform housemates off-camera, and an accelerated daily eviction schedule to prevent cancellation.

This season revolved around 20 strangers living in a house together with no communication with the outside world as they competed for $250,000. They were constantly filmed during their time in the house and were not permitted to communicate with those filming them. Unlike earlier seasons, the format of the series was revised to emphasise competition and gameplay - much like the American edition - with housemates now competing in challenges for power and safety before voting each other out of the house. When only three housemates were left, the Australian public decided which finalist would win the grand prize. This season was also the first to be completely pre-recorded before airing, except for a live finale.

The series was filmed in late February and March 2020 and aired during June and July 2020 on the Seven Network, culminating in a live finale on 22 July 2020, where Australia voted for model and tradie Chad Hurst to win the series, over Sophie Budack and Daniel Gorringe. Hurst won a cash prize of $234,656. Additionally, Kieran Davidson was bribed out of the game with a cash bribe of $15,344 during the White Room twist, taking that amount from the intended $250,000 grand prize.

== Production ==
On 23 October 2019, Seven Network confirmed it will be reviving the series in 2020. Rumours indicated the series would be closer in format to the American & Canadian versions - particularly given the upfronts trailer featured footage from Big Brother 17, Big Brother Canada 2 and Big Brother Canada 3 as well as the emphasis on the phrase "Control, Evict, Win" in the promo.

The reboot has been compared to Survivor - in which the politicking and strategising regarding the nomination and eviction processes are not only allowed (being disallowed in earlier iterations) but central to the format. Seven's Director of Programming Angus Ross confirmed there would be no regular live shows on 26 October. It was announced on 5 February 2020 that Sonia Kruger will return to host Big Brother.

=== The House ===
The Ten and Nine iterations of the series used a compound located at the Dreamworld theme park, on the Gold Coast, Queensland, as the Big Brother House. It had since been abandoned and vandalised. In June 2019, the house was set ablaze and burnt down entirely. The entire compound was demolished by Dreamworld in August 2019.

The new Big Brother House was officially revealed on 3 June 2020, located in a refurbished World War II Warehouse inside Sydney Harbour's North Head near Manly. Pictures of the new house had been leaked on 12 February 2020. This season's house had a modern eco-style interior design, featuring living walls and wood panelling as well as LED lighting and screens. A separate activity area adjacent to the main house, dubbed "Big Brother's Basement" would be used to host many of the nomination challenges. Technical changes were also evident in this house. For the first time in the Australian version, camera runs were replaced by AI cameras.

=== Impact of the COVID-19 pandemic ===
On 19 March 2020, it was confirmed that the housemates had been informed of the COVID-19 pandemic off-camera after Endemol Shine Group ordered all Big Brother adaptations in production across the world to break the format's strict rule of being disconnected with current events taking place in the world.

Days later on 22 March 2020, production of the show was shut down after a crew member had been exposed to a confirmed positive case of COVID-19 pending test results to confirm whether they had contracted the virus. During this time, all camera operators were removed from the house and housemates were filmed exclusively via the rigged cameras which were not tracking movement, while also being allowed to phone home to speak directly with loved ones. On 23 March 2020, the test of the crew member came back negative and it was announced that production would resume the following day. The events of this shutdown were depicted on Episode 13 of the season.

Production of the remainder of the series was then accelerated to avoid any further impacts on production (potentially including the season being cancelled mid-production, as was the case with the live-produced Big Brother Canada 8). Rather than having a nomination challenge and eviction every second or third day, those events then occurred mostly daily, until filming concluded.

As the COVID-19 pandemic was ongoing at the time of the broadcast, the live reunion and winner announcement was also impacted by the pandemic. On the stage, the attending housemates and a small audience of 70 (mostly loved-ones of the housemates) were seated 1.5 metres apart from each other, in regulation with the New South Wales government's COVID-19 restrictions. Additionally, Housemates Laura and Zoe were unable to make the finale due to interstate travel restrictions restricting travel between New South Wales and Victoria resulting from Second Wave and Lockdown in Victoria.

=== International broadcast ===
As with previous seasons of the show, the season was also broadcast in New Zealand. The season was broadcast on Three - which also aired the previous two seasons of the show - and premiered on 28 June 2020. This marked the first time the series had aired in primetime in New Zealand since the conclusion of the 2004 season due to the network needing to fill a scheduling gap caused by the COVID-19 pandemic delaying The Block NZ's ninth season to 2021. On 14 July 2020, it was announced due to low ratings, the show would be moving into a later timeslot and would drop to airing two episodes per week. The revised schedule saw the finale air on 25 August 2020.

This season was also broadcast on Finnish stream service Ruutu.fi from 6 December 2020 and two episodes would show every Sunday. Dutch broadcaster RTL revealed that they are going to broadcast Big Brother Australia season 12 on RTL 5, starting from 9 April 2021, only one day after their Dutch-Flemish version ended. And will broadcast every workdays on 9:30 pm.

== Format ==
For this revival series, the format was rebooted to resemble the format of the American & Canadian editions of Big Brother - with housemates determining both Nominations and Evictions. The new format added emphasis to the competitive aspect of surviving the eviction process. As such, the housemates will now be allowed to strategise, politic and collude about the nominations and evictions. However, there will still be key differences compared to the American format, most prominently, no "Power of Veto" was included as part of the format (a staple of the American and Canadian shows), and the Australian public deciding the eventual winner - rather than being decided by a Jury formed of evicted housemates (as is the case on the American and Canadian shows).

- Nominations: At the start of each round, the housemates compete in a "Nomination Challenge". The winner of the competition has the sole power over the nominations. Immediately after the challenge, the winning housemate will be called to the Diary Room by Big Brother to name three nominees, and provide full reasons for their nominations. When there are 10 Housemates remaining, only two Housemates would be nominated, instead of three.
- Eviction: On eviction night, all housemates must vote to evict one of the nominees, with the exception of the nominating housemate (who will only cast a tie-breaker vote, if required), nor do the nominated housemates vote when there are only two nominees (on account of their votes cancelling the other's out). The eviction vote is by secret ballot, with housemates casting their votes orally in the Diary Room to Big Brother, and must provide a reason for their vote. The nominee with the most votes is evicted from the house.
- Finale: The final three housemates will face Australia's vote to determine the winner.

== Companion Series ==
=== Big Brother's Eye Spy ===
Big Brother's Eye Spy, hosted by Sonia Kruger is a weekly show on the Seven Network's online streaming service 7plus. It features the evicted housemates from the week and will discuss the highlights and will also reveal the votes from the evictions over the week.

=== The Big Bro Show ===
The season includes an online companion show which features behind the scenes footage of the series, and is hosted by former Big Brother narrator as well as the host of many of the former companion shows Mike Goldman. The show is hosted via the 7 News website and social media platforms.

== Housemates ==
While some housemates were revealed early via promotion material, the full roster of 20 housemates was revealed one week before the season premiere on 1 June 2020. Twelve housemates entered on day one (episode 1), with an additional eight housemates that entered in two groups of four on day four (episodes two) and day six (episode three), respectively.

| Name | Age on entry | Hometown | Day entered | Day exited | Result |
|---|---|---|---|---|---|
| Chad Hurst | 27 | Campbelltown, New South Wales | 4 | 39 | Winner |
| Sophie Budack | 25 | Darwin, Northern Territory | 4 | 39 | Runner-up |
| Daniel Gorringe | 27 | Melbourne, Victoria | 1 | 39 | Runner-up |
| Mat Garrick | 30 | Broken Hill, New South Wales | 1 | 39 | Evicted |
| Sarah McDougal | 19 | Melbourne, Victoria | 4 | 38 | Evicted |
| Kieran Davidson | 21 | Adelaide, South Australia | 1 | 36 | Bribed (Note: Kieran accepted a bribe of $15,344. However, by accepting the offer, he had to leave the game immediately as a result.) |
| Casey Mazzucchelli | 25 | Perth, Western Australia | 1 | 33 | Evicted |
| Marissa Rancan | 61 | Sydney, New South Wales | 1 | 31 | Evicted |
| Xavier Molyneux | 22 | Sydney, New South Wales | 1 | 30 | Evicted |
| Hannah Campbell | 26 | Perth, Western Australia | 6 | 27 | Evicted |
| Angela Clancy | 37 | Perth, Western Australia | 1 | 25 | Evicted |
| Shane Vincent | 39 | Tweed Heads, New South Wales | 6 | 23 | Evicted |
| Zoe George | 39 | Melbourne, Victoria | 1 | 20 | Evicted |
| Garth Saville | 50 | Sydney, New South Wales | 4 | 18 | Evicted |
| Ian Joass | 25 | Perth, Western Australia | 1 | 16 | Evicted |
| Danni Keogh | 34 | Townsville, Queensland | 6 | 11 | Evicted |
| Talia Rycroft-Sommariva | 21 | Adelaide, South Australia | 1 | 9 | Evicted |
| SooBong Hwang | 48 | Adelaide, South Australia | 6 | 7 | Evicted |
| Allan Liang | 30 | Sydney, New South Wales | 1 | 5 | Evicted |
| Laura Coriakula | 25 | Melbourne, Victoria | 1 | 3 | Evicted |

== Episodes ==
| No. overall | No. in season | Title | Timeline | Original release date |
|---|---|---|---|---|
Week 1
| 1539 | 1 | Episode 1 | Days 1–3 | 8 June 2020 |
Each housemate was individually greeted by host Sonia Kruger before going inside the house. As the first housemate, Kieran was given a secret mission by Big Brother to unlock the bedroom by giving each housemate a high-five, invent a nickname, and massage which later included a secret handshake on entry. Once all twelve housemates entered, Kieran's mission was made public and passed the task, unlocking the bedroom. Ian gifted each housemate a fossil, Angela was upset about the lack of tea, and Talia felt uncertain about Daniel's perception of her though Daniel affirmed this belief to be false. The following morning, Daniel's snoring caused ire among the housemates which Allan hoped to use against Daniel. During a house meeting discussing their rations, Laura took a booklet from Marissa which led to her abrasiveness becoming a topic of discussion for some housemates.: Nomination Challenge: Housemates are secured onto a swing and will use their momentum to swing back and forth, gaining enough speed and height to reach a shelf where the housemate must place five balls from their bag of fifty balls. If a housemate runs out of balls they cannot continue. The first housemate to place five balls on their shelf wins.; Talia won in a close challenge against Laura. Talia immediately made her nominations for Kieran, Laura and Zoe. The housemates began discussing their options with Laura being highlighted for her attitude, and a paranoid Kieran scrambling to secure votes against Laura and Zoe. At the eviction, the housemates chose to evict the less sociable Laura in a 6-3-2 vote.
| 1540 | 2 | Episode 2 | Days 4–5 | 9 June 2020 |
Following the eviction of Laura, the housemates went to bed. At midnight, host Sonia Kruger greeted four new housemates outside the Big Brother house: Chad, Garth, Sarah and Sophie and informed them that the game had started a few days ago. Big Brother gave the new housemates a secret mission to find the second bedroom, and place their personal belongings there without being detected until the morning, passing the task would reward the housemates with a Sunday roast. Chad mistakenly walked into the wrong bedroom, touching other sleeping housemates before finding the vacant room, though was nearly caught by Allan and Marissa. The following morning, the new housemates introduced themselves and Big Brother announced they had passed their task. Talia grew weary of the new housemates' optimism to the game which Garth picked up on. Kieran spoke of his insecurities and how he felt on the edge of the relationships the rest of the housemates are making and fears being nominated again due to the new arrivals integrating better. Before going to sleep, Allan approached the new housemates about winning the upcoming nomination challenge which raised suspicions about his game-play.: Nomination Challenge: Housemates must retrieve a flag from an upright block of ice using only their body, or what is on their body. Also, the flag must not break in the ice. The first housemate to retrieve and wave their flag wins.; Garth won the challenge over Daniel and immediately nominated Allan, Angela and Kieran. The housemates began discussing their options with Garth reassuring Angela was safe and the vote would come down to Allan and Kieran. In the Diary Room, a dejected Kieran was given a pep-talk from Big Brother to continue to campaign and apologised to several housemates for his previous behaviours. Allan's confidence that Kieran would be eliminated in a landslide decision caused him to not worry about campaigning. At the eviction, Angela defended Kieran as Allan deflected his presumed intelligence. When the votes were announced, Allan was blindsided in a 12-1-1 vote.
| 1541 | 3 | Episode 3 | Days 6–7 | 10 June 2020 |
The morning after Allan's eviction, Kieran plans to avoid talking strategy, be more involved with more group activities and appease those in power. In the backyard, a crane appears overhead with four new housemates: Danni, Hannah, Shane and SooBong. Sarah immediately recognised Hannah from the audition process and had a negative opinion of her. Big Brother announced the new housemates would remain in the cage as part of their shopping task.: Shopping Task: The four new housemates: Danni, Hannah, Shane, and SooBong are suspended in a cage above the backyard, for each hour they remain in the cage $50 will be added to their shopping budget. How long they remain in the cage is determined by the current group of housemates.; The current housemates held a meeting in the lounge about how long the new housemates would stay in the cage. In the backyard, Talia asked the caged housemates to guess her profession. Talia was offended when Hannah guessed Talis was a stripper. After three hours and $150 earned, the current housemates released the new housemates and officially entered the house. Talia and Daniel began to push for one of the original housemates to win the nomination challenge, with Daniel refusing to acknowledge the newcomers as housemates. Garth and Zoe were chosen to select the shopping, as SooBong showed off his athleticism and hoped to use it to create alliances. The housemates received their groceries with Angela finally having tea.: Nomination Challenge: Housemates are divided into pairs and will support each other on a series of narrow posts. At certain intervals, each pair must transition to a smaller and taller post. The last pair standing will win and share the responsibility to nominate.; Sarah and Talia won the challenge over Mat and Sophie. Together, Sarah and Talia immediately nominated Hannah, Marissa and SooBong. The housemates began discussing their options, with Talia leading the charge against Hannah, whilst the men favoured SooBong due to his strength, and Marissa opted to not campaign for votes but did make several housemates angry about her reaction. At the eviction, SooBong declared himself a threat, which was enough for the house to evict him in a 12-2-2 vote.
Week 2
| 1542 | 4 | Episode 4 | Days 8–9 | 14 June 2020 |
The morning after SooBong's eviction, Angela joins her fellow housemates in the morning yoga session, despite being uncoordinated.: In-House Task: A life-size gingerbread house appears in the backyard. One by one, selected housemates must enter the "ginger-dread" house and be confronted by their biggest fears without pushing a panic button. Sarah, Danni, Angela, Sophie, Garth, Casey and Daniel are selected by Big Brother to participate in the task.; The housemates pass the task and win a chocolate fountain, sweets, fruit and champagne. After the task, Ian reveals to Angela that he misses his pets at home. The following morning Talia talks strategy and mentions how her alliance (herself, Daniel, Casey, Zoe, and Mat) expect to be together at the end. Angela was very uncomfortable with the house divide brought on by Talia's group and discusses voting Talia out with Marissa. They discuss with several other housemates their plan for voting her out. Kieran overhears Dan and Talia saying they want to nominate him and tries to stop that happening.: Nomination Challenge: Housemates must climb on "over-sized windchimes" suspended from the ceiling and stand on tiny footholds. At certain intervals, housemates must transition to a smaller foothold. The last housemate left on their "windchime" wins the power of nomination.; Angela wins the challenge when Sophie bows out after more than 2 hours on the pole. Angela immediately nominates Daniel, Talia and Casey. Daniel and Talia's group immediately call a meeting in the backyard and decide to evenly spread their votes. Marissa and Shane discuss voting Dan out. At the eviction, Talia and Angela argue about Talia threatening Angela over nominating her and Dan. The house evicts Talia in a 11-4-1 vote.
| 1543 | 5 | Episode 5 | Days 10–11 | 15 June 2020 |
The morning after Talia's eviction, Big Brother informed Ian that his pet huntsman spider Patricia had passed away. Ian was consoled by his housemates. Angela was still celebrating that she was able to get Talia evicted the night before. Daniel had a chat with Angela to clear the air over the divide that he and Talia brought to the house.: In-House Task: Kieran must perform a three-point turn using a supplied motorised buggy in the backyard within a reasonable time limit and with minimal damage to win pizza for the house. He completes the task with a few seconds left but leaves a large hole in the sidewall of the designated area. Because of this, Big Brother decides the house can have their pizza, but Kieran is not allowed to have any.; Later that afternoon, Mat, Daniel and Danni got makeovers from Angela, Zoe and Marissa. Kieran decided to try and make the house evict Danni by starting a rumour about her to Garth. Garth spread the rumour to several other housemates and decides that she must be evicted. This resulted in multiple housemates feeling uneasy towards Danni.: Nomination Challenge: The following morning, the housemates discover cylinders of water in the backyard. To win the power of nomination, housemates must each plug their draining cylinder with their fingers so that the water isn't lost onto the ground. The last housemate with water in their cylinder wins. In this challenge, housemates are allowed to move away from their cylinders, but that increases the risk of losing the challenge. Because of this, Big Brother periodically offered temptations to the housemates in the diary room, such as a visit from a beloved pet or gaining a second vote at the eviction.; Angela wins the challenge when Xavier steps away and lets his cylinder empty after competing for nearly 7 hours. Angela nominates Danni, Zoe and Garth. Garth felt a bit betrayed by being nominated by Angela. Danni thought she could be viewed as a threat. Kieran wanted people to vote for Danni because she'll figure out his lie. At the eviction, Garth reveals his second vote to his housemates, which makes Danni nervous. The housemates discuss the situation between Garth, Danni and Zoe that was started by Kieran's rumour. The house evicts Danni in an 11-3-2 vote. After the eviction, Garth realised that Kieran had lied to him.
| 1544 | 6 | Episode 6 | Days 12–13 | 16 June 2020 |
The morning after Danni's eviction, Big Brother gave Ian a gift of some fish to help him cope with losing Patricia, his spider, the day before. Kieran apologises to several housemates for lying to Garth the day before. Several housemates are getting frustrated by the low levels of food in the kitchen.: Shopping Task: A large ramp apparatus is unveiled in the backyard. At any time in 24 hours, a ball may be released on to the ramp, at which point an alarm will sound and a housemate's name shown on the living room screen. The indicated housemate must immediately stop what they are doing, run to the backyard and catch the ball from the end of the ramp. Each successful catch earns $10 towards the shopping budget.; Garth, Shane, Xavier and Ian discuss how Kieran is playing the game, but agree that it's probably better to keep him around to help remove a larger threat. The next morning the shopping task ends with the housemates having earned $190 for their shopping. Zoe decides not to order black tea for Angela, who is not happy with the decision.: Nomination Challenge: Giant spools of rope appear in the room. Housemates must wrap the 100m of rope on to their own body as if it were a spool, then wrap it back on to a matching spindle on the other side of the room. The first housemate to complete the task and return to the original spool wins.; Ian won the challenge and immediately nominated Marissa, Angela and Chad. Kieran, Daniel and Xavier are happy with the nominations. The housemates discuss voting for Angela, but Angela doesn't want a boys' club. At the eviction, Angela says they should start nominating for reasons other than strategy. Daniel says that he has no game plan, and Angela says "it's not Centrelink". The house voted to evict Angela in an 8-4-2 vote, but Big Brother told her in the tunnel that she wasn't evicted and to move to a secret room called Big Brother's Bunker.
Week 3
| 1545 | 7 | Episode 7 | Days 15–16 | 21 June 2020 |
Immediately after her fake eviction, Angela moved into Big Brother's Bunker, which contained a control panel and monitors for watching video feeds from the cameras. Big Brother also explained that she was to help Big Brother carry out some tasks. The following morning, the housemates awoke after having a good night's sleep. From the Bunker, Angela watched the housemates in their morning routines. Daniel targeted Kieran as the next person to be evicted.: In-House Task: The housemates must say "yes" to any request Big Brother makes. The reward for this task is a KFC bucket meal for the house.; The housemates passed the task and enjoyed their KFC. Later, the housemates got annoyed at Kieran for not helping with household chores.: Nomination Challenge: In pairs, housemates must stack ten cylinders on a wooden shelf, while keeping it balanced in the air using pulleys. Housemates must also wear Velcro-lined boots and walk on a Velcro floor. If the stack falls, they must start again.; Sarah and Zoe won the challenge. In their discussion in the diary room, Sarah stated that she wanted to nominate Garth, Casey or Xavier because she perceived them to be threats, with the latter two being in Daniel's group. However, Zoe insisted on nominating Kieran, stating that it was "non-negotiable" for her. On Zoe's urging, the pair end up nominating Kieran, Marissa and Ian with Ian being nominated strategically as a swing vote to persuade the house to evict Kieran. Ian processed his first nomination, so Daniel had a chat with him. Garth advised Kieran not to scramble. Angela was unhappy with the nominations because Kieran and Marissa were her allies. Big Brother allowed Angela to bring one housemate to the Bunker to chat with them. Angela chose Garth, and once he entered, she asked him to convince the housemates to evict Ian, to stop Daniel's group from becoming more powerful in the house. Garth re-entered the house and started spreading Angela's word, convincing those outside Daniel's group to evict Ian as a strategic move that was in their best interest. At the eviction, Kieran said he was nominated because he plays the game, and Ian reckoned his nomination was to make people vote for the others. Zoe's plan backfired when the house voted to evict Ian in a 7-4-1 vote.
| 1546 | 8 | Episode 8 | Days 17–18 | 22 June 2020 |
The morning after Ian's eviction, Daniel reminisces about his time in the house. He says that a lot of things remind him of Ian. He also says that doesn't trust Garth any more. Angela wakes up in the Bunker. Big Brother tells her that she is returning to the house shortly. Garth is excited after being able to evict Ian the night before, even though he realises he has lost face with Daniel's group for it. Big Brother reveals his Bunker and releases Angela back into the house. The housemates show excitement at her return. Angela pretends that she doesn't know Ian got evicted the night before. Mat tells Big Brother that he feels uncomfortable knowing that Garth was the driver behind Ian going home. Mat says he is a loyal man, and being betrayed has made him lose confidence in Garth. That night, Big Brother organised an Italian feast to celebrate Angela's return; the housemates stayed quiet over dinner due to the tension between the groups. To break the ice, Big Brother provided housemates with letters from their families. Early the next morning, Garth tried to smooth things over with the Alpha group. Mat says he doesn't trust him at all. He calls a meeting with the group to discuss nominating Garth and stacking votes against him. Zoe gets nervous about the plan when she hears about it.: Nomination Challenge: Long, narrow platforms run down the length of the Basement, and ribbons run down the platforms. Housemates must stack five wooden blocks on the end of the ribbon and pull on it so that the blocks move down the track and make it to the other end without falling over. The first housemate to have their stack cross the coloured line wins.; Zoe wins the challenge but says she didn't want to. She nominates Daniel, Shane and Garth, hoping that Garth goes home. Angela is pleased that Daniel is up for eviction, and tries to rally troops to vote for him. Daniel says he is happy to be the bait to get Garth out. At the eviction, Angela says she wants to get rid of dangerous players before they get rid of her. Garth says no-one should feel comfortable in the game and that everyone should be on edge. Shane says it's hard to put your complete trust in anyone. The house evicts Garth in a 12-1-0 vote. Before he leaves, he announces that he was in the Bunker.
| 1547 | 9 | Episode 9 | Days 19–20 | 23 June 2020 |
It's morning, and the girls are taking their time doing their morning beauty routines in the bathroom. Daniel is in the kitchen and says he would like to use the bathroom, but can't in front of other people. He eventually relents and goes. Early in Day 19, Shane went to the diary room because he couldn't sleep due to thoughts about the previous eviction. He wants to vote out Daniel, Mat and Xavier because they control the vote and that he wouldn't be there at the end. After sunrise, Big Brother gives the housemates a wake-up call and calls them to the lounge. He says that the girls take up to 5 hours every day doing their makeup, which means the boys don't get any time in there. He offers the boys exclusive use of the bathroom for 2 hours. The girls each get one "toilet pass" for use during this time. The girls all enter the diary room to protest. Later that day, the housemates complain of having low food stocks and talk about what their first meals on the outside would be. Kieran complains that he wouldn't eat the basic rations of tuna, rice and soy sauce on the outside and that he's craving tomato bruschetta.: Shopping Task: A few fake rain clouds appear hanging in the backyard. Over 24 hours, there will be rainstorms coming from these clouds when indicated by the lounge room screen, and housemates must collect the water and transfer it to a "rain gauge" receptacle. The more water collected, the more money won for shopping.; Big Brother gives a secret mission to the housemates for the duration of the shopping task. They are to secretly make Chad clock 12km on a pedometer hidden in his microphone. The boys get Chad running around the house and backyard, even though some of them get exhausted. By that night, the housemates collect $150 worth of water. Sophie decides to make Chad follow her around the house, but tells him that she's trying to "get his step take up". The next morning Big Brother announces the end of the task, saying they have won $175. Big Brother also announces the secret mission to Chad. However, because Sophie mentioned his step count the night before, they fail the secret mission. Sophie goes to the diary room to protest the ruling, but Big Brother stays firm. She then goes to the bedroom and chucks a tantrum. Later, Angela and Marissa are in the bathroom discussing Sophie's outburst, when Mat comes to talk to them. Angela says he is insecure and that he wants them on his side because they are strong together.: Nomination Challenge: See-saw devices appear in the backyard. Housemates must place balls on the top of the see-saw and keep them balanced using a stirrup connected to one side of it. The last housemate to keep their balls balanced on the device wins.; Marissa wins the challenge over Hannah after 45 minutes. She decides to nominate Xavier, Mat and Zoe. Sarah says those nominations are "a bombshell". Zoe got very upset that she went up against the boys, saying that she's guaranteed to go home. Angela says that her alliance is going to vote for Zoe. 15 minutes before the eviction, Shane says that he wants to vote for Mat because he is a strong player. This news is relayed back to him via Daniel. Kieran is unsure how he wants to vote. At the eviction, Zoe says she wants to stay because she wants to show people how fun she is. Mat says it's his turn to be nominated for the first time. Kieran says there were discussions about how to vote, but that he isn't sure how to vote. The housemates evict Zoe in a 6-5-1 vote.
Week 4
| 1548 | 10 | Episode 10 | Days 22–23 | 28 June 2020 |
In the morning of Day 22, Casey gets up to go to the toilet. She has been suffering from a bout of constipation for eight days, despite taking four times the recommended dosage of medication. In the green lounge room, Shane talks to Sarah about failing to evict Mat at the previous eviction. Mat wants to take down his group, consisting of Chad, Sophie, Hannah and Sarah.: In-House Task: In pre-determined pairs, housemates must stay under cardboard boxes for as long as they can. The pair that remain under their box for the longest time wins the task and receive an opulent seafood buffet.; Mat and Daniel win the meal, and Big Brother asks them to pick another box pair to join them. They choose Angela and Xavier and announce it to their housemates. That night, the four housemates enjoy their buffet in the green lounge room. Chat quickly turns to the next nominations and Daniel mentions Shane as their next target. Angela decides to team up with the boys to take Shane out. Meanwhile in the bedroom, Shane, Sarah and Hannah agree that if the boys win the nominations, then they will be put up. On her return from dinner, Angela informs Marissa of the plan to evict Shane. Marissa isn’t comfortable with what Angela has in mind.: Nomination Challenge: Housemates stand next to conveyor belts delivering coloured boxes. When the housemates’ assigned coloured box arrives on the conveyor, they must use it to form a horizontal stack against a platform. If the stack falls, the housemate is out of the challenge. The last housemate to keep their stack intact wins.; Mat wins the challenge and decides to nominate Shane, Marissa and Angela. He tells Marissa and Angela that he put them up so that it didn’t look like they were working together. Sarah offers to talk to people and convince them not to vote for Shane. Mat warns Angela that he is going to put on an act in the eviction room. At the eviction, Shane says that Angela is a manipulative genius. Mat says that the seafood dinner only brought him closer to Angela for a couple of hours. Shane gets evicted in a 6-5-0 vote.
| 1549 | 11 | Episode 11 | Days 24–25 | 29 June 2020 |
It’s the morning of Day 24, and Casey has finally been able to go to the toilet. Later, Angela goes to the diary room to talk about yesterday’s deal with the boys. She says that she has faith in them, despite being nominated by them. Xavier, however, doesn’t trust her. Mat wants to keep his enemies close.: In-House Task: Housemates must each wear a balloon filled with confetti on their waist and not let it pop until sunset. If their balloon pops, they are to remain in the backyard until sunrise and eat, wash and sleep there. Housemates that keep their balloons intact at sunset get exclusive access to the house and enjoy a home-cooked meal.; With an hour left before sunset and three housemates left in the challenge, Big Brother requests one of them to visit the diary room. Mat discovers the reason for the visit is a secret mission to pop the others’ balloons, in exchange for inviting one other housemate back into the house to enjoy the meal. Mat succeeds in popping Angela’s and Marissa’s balloons and selects Daniel to join him inside. Angela is upset about having to camp outside for the first time. The campers receive camping beds, sleeping beds and dehydrated meals, while Mat and Daniel enjoy their roast dinner. Later that night, Daniel and Mat decide to dress up in Angela and Marissa’s clothes from the bedroom and parade in front of their housemates to the amusement of all except Angela and Marissa. In bed, Angela gets paranoid over the presence of wildlife. The next morning, the wildlife is still scaring Angela, so she pleads to go back inside. Once inside, Angela declares that camping isn’t for her. In the bedroom, Mat starts rallying the housemates to evict Angela, especially after she woke them up early. Marissa overhears this and alerts Angela, who has a chat with Sophie about this.: Nomination Challenge: Housemates must use their feet to rest a cylinder against a board in front of them. If they drop their cylinder, then they are eliminated.; After 45 minutes, Big Brother instructs the remaining six housemates to use both feet on the cylinder. Sophie wins the challenge after Daniel and Sarah both decide to drop out. She nominates Angela, Kieran and Casey. Angela has a chat with her about being put up. She says that Angela is her biggest threat in the challenges, even though she trains as an elite athlete. Angela starts to target Casey for eviction and tries to convince others to vote for her. At the eviction ceremony, Angela calls Mat two-faced and that Casey hasn’t earned her place in the house. The house chooses to evict Angela in a 9-1-0 vote.
| 1550 | 12 | Episode 12 | Days 26–27 | 30 June 2020 |
It's day 26, and the housemates are congratulating each other on making it to the top 10. Kieran says that he thought he wouldn't make it to the top 10 and celebrated in the diary room by dancing. He asks Big Brother to rate his dance out of 10, and Big Brother gives his dance a 9. Whilst the rest of the house is celebrating, Daniel was not. Talking to Sarah and Chad, he says he misses his girlfriend, Anna. Sarah says that Daniel has fallen in love with her from being apart. In the diary room, he reveals that they broke up because of him not being mature enough. Before entering, they rekindled but didn't make anything official. Daniel reveals that Anna asked him to apply for Big Brother. In Daniel's words, "Anna is the greatest thing that has happened to me". In the living room, Anna appears on the screen, and the housemates gather around. Daniel asks Anna if she still loves him, her response being yes. The housemates celebrate and Daniel breaks down. Later on, the house begins a small cricket game, but they realise Hannah is missing. Hannah is strategising and wants to get rid of one of the alpha boys Mat, Daniel and Xavier after what Angela had said at the last eviction. She gathers Marissa, Sarah and Sophie and says that they will target Chad. Sophie relays this to Chad, and Chad takes it with a grain of salt. Housemates are then gathered in the living room by Big Brother for the shopping task.: Shopping Task: Housemates were given twenty minutes to complete a series of tasks for shopping money. Big Brother would call each housemate up into the diary room with a task to complete, and all the tasks had to be completed within twenty minutes. If they were successful they would get $250.; Kieran's task was to eat 5 hot chilis. Sarah and Mat had to thread five needles whilst wearing muscle stimulators. Xavier and Marissa had to wrap presents whilst wearing oven mittens. Chad had to eat some dry wheat biscuits. Casey and Dan had to blow up a series of balloons until they popped. Finally, Hannah and Sophie (with 5 minutes and 18 seconds left) had to clean up a mess of confetti in the diary room. They won $250 and a Mexican feast with only five seconds to spare. The next day, Big Brother gives Kieran a riddle, Kieran gives up but Mat gives the correct answer. Kieran talks with Daniel and says that Casey should be evicted. Kieran asks Daniel to keep it a secret, but Daniel tells Casey immediately. Casey immediately talks to Kieran about this, and Casey is annoyed at Kieran for doing this, making Kieran Casey's target. Xavier warns Casey about her move to tell Kieran. Casey apologises to Daniel for what she did. Kieran wants to win the challenge and nominate Casey for eviction.: Nomination Challenge: In pairs, housemates were to assemble a domino stack across a large track. The first team to build and then knock their first domino stack to hope that the domino run would fall in succession and knock the last four large dominos.; The winners of the challenge Daniel and Xavier had to nominate two housemates for eviction. They put up Sophie and Hannah. Before the eviction, the numbers are on Hannah. Casey is persuaded to evict Hannah, however, she wanted to evict Sophie. Hannah and Casey make a pact for Casey to evict Sophie. At the eviction ceremony, Sophie is emotional after Sonia asks her about her relationship with Chad. She says that she wasn't looking for anyone in the house until she met Chad. Chad has similar feelings and would protect Sophie. Some housemates are scared that if they vote Sophie, Chad will get revenge. Chad adds fuel to the fire saying that if they evict Sophie he will have revenge. Hannah gets evicted after a 5-1 vote.
Week 5
| 1551 | 13 | Episode 13 | Days 28–30 | 5 July 2020 |
It's day 28 and all starts well until all the cameras found in the house's windows are covered up and the fixed cameras in the house stop moving. The housemates are all confused and Sophie and Sarah go to Big Brother to find out what is happening. The footage from the house cuts to Sonia out the front of the house, reporting that a crew member has been in contact with someone who has tested positive to COVID-19. The game is therefore temporarily suspended until Big Brother gets the results from the crew member's test. The housemates are still being filmed, however through the cameras fixed around the house. All housemates have been given some information over the time that they have been in the house. The housemates are called into the diary room where he breaks the news about the crew member. All housemates were also able to get one phone call from home. Sarah asks Daniel if COVID-19 is as bad as chickenpox, and Daniel replies with it being way worse. Each person is called up to the diary room and given some time to call their person of choice. On day 30, the crew member tested negative and the game resumed.: In-House Task: Housemates need to search for a Big Brother eye token hidden somewhere in the house. When they find it, they need to go to the diary room with the eye and they will receive the advantage.; Sarah finds it hidden in an artificial pot plant in the green room. Her advantage is that she can veto herself or one of her fellow housemates from an eviction. She is allowed to tell people or keep it to herself. The housemates when she leaves the diary room keep hassling her to tell them her advantage. Sarah tells Sophie her advantage and Sarah promises to keep it a secret.: Nomination Challenge: Chairs are scattered around the house. When Big Brother says go the housemates need to run to a chair and claim it. The person without a chair is then out of the challenge. Two housemates can not be on one chair and a chair is removed after every round. The last one standing wins.; Chad won the challenge and nominated Casey, Xavier and Sarah. Sarah removed herself from the nominations, after winning the scavenger challenge leaving Casey and Xavier as the two nominees for eviction. At the eviction ceremony, Xavier was evicted in a 6-0 vote.
| 1552 | 14 | Episode 14 | Day 31 | 6 July 2020 |
On day 31, the housemates are up and working, except Kieran who is again not helping with any chores. In a secret mission, Chad was tasked with getting Sophie up and dressed up in some fancy clothes, but only tell her that the reason why he is making her do it is for a 'surprise'. If he successfully did so, Big Brother would reward both of them a picnic breakfast to celebrate their one month anniversary. Chad completes the task and Sophie and Chad enjoy their breakfast in the backyard, with the other housemates watching from the inside. Casey is determined to get the power couple (Chad and Sophie) out of the house after they were responsible for Xavier's eviction the night before. Mat insists they evict Kieran as he is a pest, only with Casey telling him that there are bigger fish to fry.: In-House Task: Big Brother had the ability to control every housemate in the house using the phrases: 'fast forward', "rewind" and "pause". The housemates had to do as he wished, and if they did they would be treated with burgers.; The housemates were successful in the house task and burger lunch. Marissa tried to regain trust with Chad, Sophie and Sarah. Marissa tries to do this by giving the group information from Casey about her plan to evict Sophie and Chad. However, Chad walks in on a conversation between Casey and Dan on Casey's wish to try and get rid of Sophie and Chad. Casey accidentally slips up and throws Marissa under the bus saying that Marissa wants Chad and Sophie gone. Marissa says that Casey is the one lying, but Chad doesn't believe her.: Nomination Challenge: In the backyard, the housemates had to hold onto two blue discs with their hands and have their feet rest on two of the six numbered discs placed in different positions. For each housemate, the discs were placed based on their height. If they accidentally took their hands off the blue discs or their feet off the right discs, they were out.; Casey wins after persuading to Chad and Sophie that she won't nominate them. Casey puts up Marissa and Kieran for eviction. In a last-ditch effort to keep herself in the house, Marissa goes to each housemate and talks to them. However this proves useless because at the eviction ceremony, she was evicted from the house in a 5-0 vote. Her parting words were for the housemates was to tell them that she had a lasagne in the oven for them.
| 1553 | 15 | Episode 15 | Day 32–33 | 7 July 2020 |
After Marissa's eviction the night before, Casey and Mat are situated in the living room, taking time to strategise. As usual, their targets Chad and Sophie have survived, winning more nomination challenges, keeping them safe. Casey is determined to change Sarah's mind and make her part of the alliance consisting of Casey, Mat and Dan.: Shopping Task: Housemates were divided into pairs (except Sophie as there was an odd number of housemates). They had to complete some shifts for Big Brother. If they had completed the jobs, they would win $200 shopping money.; In rotation one, Chad and Daniel were required to sort out two bowls of potato chips into three containers based on their flavours: Original; cheese and onion and salt and vinegar. However, the catch was that they could only lick the chips to find out what flavour they were and weren't allowed to eat any chips. Sophie was required to count a series of flashing lights. Sarah and Casey were told to remove nuts and bolts from some disgusting water. Mat and Kieran, however, had a table of high tea that they could enjoy whilst their fellow housemates suffered. Their task was to not tell any of the housemates that they were being pampered, if they completed the task successfully, the $200 would double. Later on the day, the housemates were called back to complete more jobs. Chad and Daniel's second job was to find coloured buttons within some manure. Sophie had to clean mud from shoes, Sarah and Casey had to top and tail prawns. Mat and Kieran were again given some pampering with face masks and champagne. The housemates completed their tasks to Big Brother's standards, and Mat and Kieran had kept their pampering a secret from all housemates, they had won $400 shopping budget. On day 33, the housemates were again all about strategy, especially the couple Chad and Sophie who noticed Casey trying to get Sarah to be part of Casey's alliance. Chad says that they need to make sure that Sarah doesn't flip. Sophie reassures Chad that Sarah wouldn't do that to them.: Nomination Challenge: Housemates had to stand on a large frame, and hang on. The frame would slowly tilt forward. The last housemate standing would get to nominate two housemates.; Kieran lasts 45 minutes on the frame, which is the longest amount of time he has stayed on in an endurance challenge. However, Sophie wins the challenge, immediately nominating Casey and Kieran, the latter being his sixth time as a nominee for eviction. Sophie's strategy is to keep Kieran as the safe vote so she can cause a tie, meaning that Sophie would have a final choice. However, Sarah is the vote that would be able to make it work. Being torn between two alliances, Sarah is the deciding vote in the game. At the eviction ceremony, the vote is a 2-2 causing a tie. Sophie had to decide who to evict and she decided to evict Casey making it a 3-2 vote.
Week 6
| 1554 | 16 | Episode 16 | Days 33–34 | 13 July 2020 |
Immediately after Casey's eviction, the housemates stand around in the eviction room. After being dismissed from the eviction room, the housemates walk outside. On day 34, the housemates wake to both Daniel's snoring and Kieran's celebrations of surviving his sixth eviction. Usually, Mat and Daniel would be determined to get rid of Kieran, however, Daniel realises Kieran would be the perfect number to use to evict either Sophie or Chad.: In-House Task: In the backyard is a glass box, dubbed "Big Brother's Power Booth". At certain times, housemates would be able to enter the booth and try to grab either a blue or pink piece of confetti. If they grabbed a pink piece of confetti they would get a reward. If they grabbed a blue one, they could inflict a punishment on a fellow housemate.; Sarah was allowed to go first and picked a blue piece of confetti. She was told to make someone the resident dishwasher (meaning this person had to clean the dishes for the day). Instinctively, she chose Kieran who had washed the dishes fewer times than he had been up for eviction. Kieran was naturally angry and was angrier when he didn't know where soap was. Chad grabbed a blue piece of confetti and was allowed to ask one housemate to grab their belongings and give them to Big Brother for the day. Kieran received the punishment, however having a glass half full look on it saying that if he was nominated he wouldn't need to pack. Daniel and Mat enjoyed Kieran's dishwashing duty by making sure that they had made the kitchen a total mess for Kieran to clean up. When Sophie went into the booth, she got a blue piece of confetti and banished Daniel to stand at the front door and not participate in the challenge. Finally, Sophie and Sarah won some KFC that they could enjoy in the diary room.: Nomination Challenge: Housemates had to stand on a wobbly board and balance a ball on a platform at the same time. The last one standing gets the power to nominate.; Chad won the nominate challenge, beating out Dan slightly. Chad once again put Kieran up for his seventh nomination and Mat which Chad says is going to be the safe vote. At the eviction, Kieran was evicted in a 3-0 vote. However, in a twist, he was stopped in the hallway of the main entrance and transported into the white room, a room where everything is white meant to drive the housemates inside insane. Big Brother tells him to survive as long as he can in there, as that may be a way to get himself back in the game.
| 1555 | 17 | Episode 17 | Day 35 | 14 July 2020 |
At the start of the episode, Kieran is ushered into Big Brother's white room, where Big Brother tells him to stay in the white room as long as he says so. If he succeeds, he will get a second chance at the game. There are also two red buttons in the middle of the room. Big Brother tells Kieran that if he cannot handle the white room anymore, he can press the button and leave the house immediately. Big Brother also made a pun at the end of his monologue, saying that everything is going to be "all white (alright). Meanwhile, in the other sections of the house, the housemates wake up to a nasty surprise, as someone or somebody took every single object in the living room, kitchen and dining room, and even drained the water out of the pool and stole Daniel's fish. Big Brother talks to the housemates, revealing that he did not take it on purpose, and asked every housemate to come to the diary room to state their opinion on what happened. Daniel claimed that he heard Mat pick up the couch and mutter to himself how heavy it was, scoop cups of water out of the pool, try to jiggle the microwave out, and most importantly, steal Daniel's fish. Mat claimed that he heard Daniel crying about something in bed, which was claimed to be usual. He also noted that Chad's lollies from the previous episodes were not stolen. He also said that Chad and Sophie have given him looks and noted suspicious behaviour. At the white room, Kieran jokingly asks for a glass of red wine and a steak, but Big Brother says that that wouldn't be white. Kieran then asked, as a response, for a vanilla milkshake instead, saying that was white. Big Brother later says to Kieran to think of the white room as a halfway house, in which Kieran adds on by calling it a prison. Kieran composes a tune about how he wants someone to save him from "this hell", which, in this case, is the white room. Big Brother talks to Sarah and asks her what happened. She claimed that she watered some inside plants, much to Mat and Sophie's disbelief, claiming that it wasn't a normal routine. Sarah slowly gets annoyed, in which Big Brother tells her to calm down. Big Brother then abruptly ends Sarah's interview and calls Chad to the Diary Room. Big Brother tells Chad to remove his hood and thus asks him why he looks tired. He says that there's probably a thief in the house and claims Sarah was acting strange. After a few more interviews, Daniel is called into the diary room where he is greeted by a bunch of the kitchen appliances and his fish. Big Brother says that he has to choose one of the two options, but not both. He regretfully declines his fish and accepts the appliances instead. When Sophie is called in, she is greeted by a confetti pop and a small KFC meal, as a reward for her being the 1000th diary room entrant.: Nomination Challenge: - In Big Brother's basement, each housemate wears a brown harness vest and are all individually hooked to a heavy bag that is 70% of their total body weight. In each housemate's lane are three boxes filled with several puzzle pieces. Each housemate is given a ring of 30 keys, in which only three can open all the boxes. The aim is to open all the puzzle piece boxes and assemble the puzzle pieces as quickly as possible. The first housemate to complete this task gets the power to nominate two housemates for eviction.; Daniel wins the challenge by a very small sliver and nominates Sarah and Sophie. Sarah is annoyed just because she was singled out as the only person that doesn't have a partner in the house. She also talks to Sophie saying that one vote could be the difference between her going home and staying in the house. She also says that Chad will convince Mat to back up Sophie and claims that she could be the easy vote. At the end of the day, at the eviction, Sophie and Sarah receive one vote each, which leaves Daniel with the power to decide who goes home. Daniel eventually decides to evict Sophie, who says her goodbyes and starts making her way to the door. However, Big Brother tells Sophie that she has not been evicted and is asked to make her way to the end of the corridor, which is where the white room is. When she walks in, she is surprised by Kieran who is behind the door.
| 1556 | 18 | Episode 18 | Days 35–36 | 15 July 2020 |
At the beginning of the episode, we return to Sophie opening the white room door and being surprised by Kieran who was behind the door. Her immediate reaction nearly caused her to press the red button in the middle of the room by accident. After the shock, Big Brother explained how the white room worked to Sophie and is told to change into the white clothes provided by Big Brother. During the evening back in the house, Chad is awake thinking about Sophie after she was evicted from the game. Meanwhile, in the diary room Dan is quite happy with his move to evict Sophie, telling Big Brother that the eviction of Sophie was purely strategical and not a personal attack against Chad. Chad, however in his chat with Big Brother says that Dan had betrayed the final four pact that they made earlier in the game. In the white room, Sophie has found herself with quite a vengeance and wants revenge on the bromance (Dan and Mat). Talking to Kieran, who seemingly is in a different world to Sophie, she tells him that she wants to destroy the boys and is out for blood, whilst doing a walk around the room. Then with a butter knife she writes 'Revenge is a b***h' on the wall, with two stick figures below. Big Brother once again tells them that they can press the button at any time, with Sophie responding with 'You're not gonna break us'. Meanwhile back in the house, Mat and Dan are talking about who they would rather have in the final three- Chad or Sarah whilst taking a shower. They come to a conclusion to take Chad over Sarah to the final 3. Big Brother calls the remaining housemates and then tells them that the challenge is not a nomination challenge, rather a challenge to win a power.: In-House Task: Set up in the backyard, each housemate had a catapult and a corresponding net. Their challenge was to use the balls provided to launch them into their opponents nets. Once a certain amount of balls had made it into the net, the person would be out. The one who is left standing wins a power that would not be revealed until later that night.; Mat and Dan had eliminated both Sarah and Chad and then Mat eliminated Dan, meaning Mat had won the challenge and would receive the power. As a treat for the final four, Big Brother threw a soiree for them, which Sarah called a soi-rez. They are given small finger food and some champagne as part of their soiree. However, during their soiree, the living room screen displayed the white room feed. The housemates were shocked, especially Mat and Dan who couldn't believe their eyes. Sonia appears through the white room's screen and tells Sophie and Kieran that one of them will be returning to the house. However, to decide who would go back to the house a cash sum would appear on the screen and rise over a minute. If they pressed the red button in that one minute they would receive the sum that they stopped on. If no one or someone is too late to press the button, Mat would decide who to bring back, as he had won the challenge that afternoon. Kieran presses the button and is stopped at $15,344. He is required to leave the house immediately, and the money would be deducted from the grand prize of $250,000. Kieran tells Sophie to get revenge on the boys that evicted her and tells her to win it for me (Kieran). Sophie returns to the house, and Mat and Dan throws a tantrum when she walks through the door. Mat goes to the diary room and throws a tantrum at Big Brother. Dan threatens to walk from the house, and goes to Big Brother in the diary room. Big Brother tells Dan the twists 'are an integral part of the game'. Dan tells Big Brother than he has been blindsided by Big Brother. The episode ends with Sophie sipping on champagne saying "Game on moles".
Week 7
| 1557 | 19 | Episode 19 | Days 37–38 | 20 July 2020 |
At the start of day 37, the recently reunited lovers, Chad and Sophie are seen in the bedrooms hugging each other. Mat and Daniel have woken up, still annoyed over the white room twist, which brought Sophie back into the house. In return for his twist, Big Brother called Sarah and Dan into the diary room and letting them meet a special visitor, the visitor was a golden retriever named Banjo. Dan brings Banjo out of the diary room so the other housemates could meet the dog. Everyone except Mat were happy meeting Banjo the dog, with Mat not really caring at all. Big Brother then told Daniel to bring Banjo back to the diary room as their time with him was over.: Nomination Challenge- Part One: In the first part of the nomination challenge, the basement had five large containers of corn. Each housemate was allocated to a container and on Big Brother's count, they had to open a small door at the bottom of the container letting the corn out. With a bucket provided to them, they had to catch the corn that was being let out and bring it back to the top of the container to refill it. They would need to repeat this process to keep as much corn in the container. The first person who does not have corn left in their container will be eliminated and won't sit part two of the challenge, and be immediately up for eviction.; Sophie, who was given a second chance at the game would have less corn in her container, making the challenge more difficult, as the less corn in the container, the quicker the container would empty. Mat would be given an advantage of a second vote at the eviction, as he was unable to use the power given to him the night before. Sarah is the first with an empty container, eliminating her from the next part of the nomination challenge and would be up for eviction.: Nomination Challenge- Part Two: The competing housemates had to lie in a cage and open five locks to get them out, using the many keys provided to them. However, the cage would fill up with water. The one to free themselves first would become the nominator, and nominate someone else to sit with Sarah at the eviction.; Sophie was given the disadvantage, because of being given the second chance and would be required to open six locks instead of five. Chad managed to free himself first, and won the power to nominate one extra person for eviction. He chose Mat, and because of Mat's advantage he will still be able to cast one vote, even though he is nominated for eviction. At the eviction ceremony, Sarah is evicted in a vote of 2-1. After Sarah leaves the house, Big Brother tells the final four that tomorrow will be the last day of the Big Brother game.
| 1558 | 20 | Episode 20 | Day 39 | 21 July 2020 |
The final four; Mat, Dan, Sophie and Chad, wake up on their final day in the Big Brother house. Big Brother calls them into the living room where he has a special surprise for all of them. On the large screen, Big Brother had asked the evicted housemates to send video messages in for the final four in the house. Once all the video messages had been seen, the housemates were all given a special breakfast for making it to the final four. At the dining table, they all reflect on their time in the Big Brother house.: Nomination Challenge: In Big Brother's basement, there were four large marble runs. When Big Brother instructed them, they would need to drop a ball from the top of the run and have to make their way to the bottom of the stairs and catch their ball at the bottom of the track without dropping them. They would then need to make their way to the top of the track and drop the marble from the top and repeat the same process. At certain times, Big Brother would ask them to add another ball to the run. The last one to not let any balls fall to the ground, they will win the first spot in the Final 3 and be cast the sole vote to evict one person out of the house.; Mat and Sophie drop out after having four balls on their track, leaving Dan and Chad (with an ankle injury) to fight it out for the power to nominate. Daniel drops out, when a ball falls at the bottom of the track, making Chad the winner. Chad is called to the diary room, and Big Brother congratulates him on the win, and gives Chad a surprise phone call to his mum. Chad tells his mum that he has made it to the final three and his mum congratulates him. However, even though winning the challenge, he is required to evict either Sophie, Dan or Mat. Sophie and Chad talk it over, and is faced with the dilemma of either stick to his morals or something that will make him win. At the eviction ceremony, Chad comes to a decision that he would rather take Dan to the final three than Mat, ultimately evicting Mat from the house. Once Mat has been evicted, Big Brother sets off fireworks in the backyard and the final three celebrate with champagne and a hug, as one of them will ultimately be the winner of Big Brother.
Finale
| 1559 | 21 | Finale | N/A | 22 July 2020 |
The live finale and reunion hosted by Sonia Kruger brings back the evicted housemates and looks back on the best, funniest and saddest moments of the season in front of an audience. Later on, the final three (Chad, Sophie and Dan) were given one minute to pitch why they should be crowned the winner. The live vote crowned Chad Hurst as the winner, who had accidentally slipped the f-word live after finding out his win.

== Voting history ==
- This housemate was nominated for this round of eviction.
- This housemate won the Nomination Challenge on this round of eviction.
- This housemate was in a different room of the house and did not participate in this round of eviction.

| | Week 1 | | | Week 2 | | | Week 3 | | | Week 4 | | | Week 5 | | | Week 6 | | | Week 7 | | | |
| Episode | 1 | 2 | 3 | 4 | 5 | 6 | 7 | 8 | 9 | 10 | 11 | 12 | 13 | 14 | 15 | 16 | 17 | 18 | 19 | 20 | Finale | |
|---|---|---|---|---|---|---|---|---|---|---|---|---|---|---|---|---|---|---|---|---|---|---|
| Nominating Housemate(s) | Talia | Garth | Sarah; Talia | Angela | Angela | Ian | Sarah; Zoe | Zoe | Marissa | Mat | Sophie | Daniel; Xavier | Chad | Casey | Sophie | Chad | Daniel | Mat | Chad | Chad | (none) | |
| Nominations | Kieran; Laura; Zoe | Allan; Angela; Kieran | Hannah; Marissa; SooBong | Casey; Daniel; Talia | Danni; Garth; Zoe | Angela; Chad; Marissa | Ian; Kieran; Marissa | Daniel; Garth; Shane | Mat; Xavier; Zoe | Angela; Marissa; Shane | Angela; Casey; Kieran | Hannah; Sophie | Casey; ~~Sarah~~; Xavier | Kieran; Marissa | Casey; Kieran | Kieran; Mat | Sarah; Sophie | (none) | **Sarah**; Mat | Daniel; Mat; Sophie | (none) | |
| Chad | Not in House | Allan | SooBong | Talia | Danni | Marissa | Ian | Garth | Mat | Angela | Angela | Hannah | Nominating Housemate | Marissa | Casey | Nominating Housemate | Sarah | No voting | Nominating Housemate | Mat | **Winner** (Finale) | |
| Sophie | Not in House | Allan | SooBong | Casey | Danni | Angela | Ian | Garth | Mat | Angela | Nominating Housemate | Nominated | Xavier | Marissa | Casey | Kieran | Nominated | White; Room | Mat | Nominated | **Runner-up** (Finale) | |
| Daniel | Laura | Allan | SooBong | Casey | Danni | Angela | Kieran | Garth | Zoe | Shane | Angela | Nominating Housemate | Xavier | Marissa | Kieran | Kieran | Sophie | No voting | Sarah | Nominated | **Runner-up** (Finale) | |
| Mat | Laura | Allan | SooBong | Casey | Danni | Angela | Kieran | Garth | Zoe | Nominating Housemate | Angela | Hannah | Xavier | Marissa | Kieran | Nominated | Sophie | No voting | Sarah | Nominated | Evicted (Day 39) | |
| Sarah | Not in House | Allan | Nominating Housemate | Talia | Garth | Marissa | Nominating Housemate | Garth | Xavier | Angela | Angela | Hannah | Xavier | Marissa | Casey | Kieran | Nominated | No voting | Nominated | Evicted (Day 38) | | |
| Kieran | Zoe | Allan | SooBong | Talia | Danni | Chad | Ian | Garth | Zoe | Shane | Angela | Hannah | Xavier | Nominated | Nominated | Nominated | White; Room | | Bribed (Day 36) | | | |
| Casey | Laura | Allan | SooBong | Talia | Danni | Angela | Kieran | Garth | Zoe | Shane | Angela | Hannah | Nominated | Nominating Housemate | Nominated | Evicted (Day 33) | | | | | | |
| Marissa | Zoe | Angela | SooBong | Talia | Garth | Chad | Ian | Garth | Nominating Housemate | Shane | Angela | Sophie | Xavier | Nominated | Evicted (Day 31) | | | | | | | |
| Xavier | Laura | Allan | Hannah | Talia | Danni | Angela | Marissa | Garth | Zoe | Shane | Angela | Nominating Housemate | Nominated | Evicted (Day 30) | | | | | | | | |
| Hannah | Not in House | | SooBong | Talia | Zoe | Chad | Ian | Garth | Mat | Angela | Angela | Nominated | Evicted (Day 27) | | | | | | | | | |
| Angela | Laura | Allan | Hannah | Nominating Housemate | Nominating Housemate | Chad | Bunker | Garth | Zoe | Shane | Casey | Evicted (Day 25) | | | | | | | | | | |
| Shane | Not in House | | SooBong | Casey | Zoe | Angela | Ian | Garth | Mat | Angela | Evicted (Day 23) | | | | | | | | | | | |
| Zoe | Kieran | Allan | SooBong | Talia | Danni | Angela | Nominating Housemate | Nominating Housemate | Mat | Evicted (Day 20) | | | | | | | | | | | | |
| Garth | Not in House | Nominating Housemate | SooBong | Talia | Danni^{(x2)} | Angela | Ian | Daniel | Evicted (Day 18) | | | | | | | | | | | | | |
| Ian | Laura | Allan | Marissa | Talia | Danni | Nominating Housemate | Kieran | Evicted (Day 16) | | | | | | | | | | | | | | |
| Danni | Not in House | | SooBong | Talia | Garth | Evicted (Day 11) | | | | | | | | | | | | | | | | |
| Talia | Nominating Housemate | Allan | Nominating Housemate | Daniel | Evicted (Day 9) | | | | | | | | | | | | | | | | | |
| SooBong | Not in House | | Marissa | Evicted (Day 7) | | | | | | | | | | | | | | | | | | |
| Allan | Zoe | Kieran | Evicted (Day 5) | | | | | | | | | | | | | | | | | | | |
| Laura | Kieran | Evicted (Day 3) | | | | | | | | | | | | | | | | | | | | |
| Notes | none | | (Note: This was a pairs Nomination Challenge. The nominating pair had to agree on nominations.) | none | (Note: During Episode 5's nomination challenge, Big Brother attempted to bribed the housemates. One bribe was a “Game Advantage” which was taken by Garth, which was an extra vote for that night's eviction. He cast both votes for Danni.) | (Note: Episode 6 was a fake eviction episode. After being voted off, Angela secretly moved into Big Brother's Bunker, where she was able to secretly watch the remaining housemates. Additionally, she was allowed to consult any Housemate regarding what she had seen to help them. She consulted Garth. She returned to the house in Episode 8.) | , | none | | | | , (Note: From Episodes 12, only two housemates were nominated instead of three. As a nominees' votes would cancel the other's out, nominated housemates no longer voted in evictions.) | (Note: During Episode 13, Big Brother gave the housemates a scavenger hunt for a “Game Advantage”. Sarah won and was awarded the power to save one of the next nominees. At the Nomination Ceremony, Sarah vetoed her nomination.) | none | (Note: As, the house’s vote was tied, the nominating housemate cast a tie-breaker vote.) | (Note: Episodes 16 and 17 were both fake eviction episodes with both evictees (Kieran and Sophie) being secretly sent to the white room. On Episode 18, Kieran and Sophie participated in a dilemma. Big Brother offered a monetary bribe that would increase over a minute. If the bribe was accepted, the bribed housemate would leave the game, taking the bribe from the intended $250,000 grand prize. Had no one accepted, the grand prize remained intact and Mat (the winner of that episode's "Advantage Challenge"), would decide who to evict between Kieran and Sophie.) | , | | , (Note: Episode 19 featured two challenges. In the first challenge, the loser was instantly nominated and could not compete in the second challenge. Sarah lost this challenge and her nomination is indicated in Bold. The second challenge was for the power to name the second nominee.) (Note: As Sophie returned to the game, she was given a penalty in both of episode 19's challenges, making the challenges more difficult to win. As Mat's advantage in episode 18 didn't come into play, he was given a new advantage for episode 19 - an extra vote in that episode's Eviction, regardless of whether he is nominated.) | (Note: The winner of Final Challenge won their place in the Final as well as the sole vote at the Final Eviction. The other three housemates were nominated for the Final Eviction.) | (Note: For the finale, Australia voted for the winner of the twelfth season and the $234,656 grand prize.) | |
| Source | | | | | | | | | | | | | | | | | | none | | | | |
| Evicted | **Laura**; 6 of 11 votes to evict | **Allan**; 12 of 14 votes to evict | **SooBong**; 12 of 16 votes to evict | **Talia**; 11 of 16 votes to evict | **Danni**; 11 of 16 votes to evict | **Angela**; 8 of 14 votes to fake evict | **Ian**; 7 of 12 votes to evict | **Garth**; 12 of 13 votes to evict | **Zoe**; 6 of 12 votes to evict | **Shane**; 6 of 11 votes to evict | **Angela**; 9 of 10 votes to evict | **Hannah**; 5 of 6 votes to evict | **Xavier**; 6 of 6 votes to evict | **Marissa**; 5 of 5 votes to evict | **Casey**; 3 of 5 votes to evict | **Kieran**; 3 of 3 votes to fake evict | **Sophie**; 2 of 3 votes to fake evict | **Kieran**; Bribed ($15,344) | **Sarah**; 2 of 3 votes to evict | **Mat**; Chad’s choice to evict | **Daniel**; Fewest votes (out of 3) | **Sophie**; Fewest votes (out of 3) |
| Saved | **Zoe**; 3 of 11 votes to evict | **Angela**; 1 of 14 votes to evict | **Hannah**; 2 of 16 votes to evict | **Casey**; 4 of 16 votes to evict | **Garth**; 3 of 16 votes to evict | **Chad**; 4 of 14 votes to fake evict | **Kieran**; 4 of 12 votes to evict | **Daniel**; 1 of 13 votes to evict | **Mat**; 5 of 12 votes to evict | **Angela**; 5 of 11 votes to evict | **Casey**; 1 of 10 votes to evict | **Sophie**; 1 of 6 votes to evict | **Casey**; 0 of 6 votes to evict | **Kieran**; 0 of 5 votes to evict | **Kieran**; 2 of 5 votes to evict | **Mat**; 0 of 3 votes to fake evict | **Sarah**; 1 of 3 votes to fake evict | **Sophie**; Returned to house | **Mat**; 1 of 3 votes to evict | **Daniel**; Chad's choice to save | **Chad**; Most votes to win | |
| Saved | **Kieran**; 2 of 11 votes to evict | **Kieran**; 1 of 14 votes to evict | **Marissa**; 2 of 16 votes to evict | **Daniel**; 1 of 16 votes to evict | **Zoe**; 2 of 16 votes to evict | **Marissa**; 2 of 14 votes to fake evict | **Marissa**; 1 of 12 votes to evict | **Shane**; 0 of 13 votes to evict | **Xavier**; 1 of 12 votes to evict | **Marissa**; 0 of 11 votes to evict | **Kieran**; 0 of 10 votes to evict | **Sophie**; 1 of 6 votes to evict | **Casey**; 0 of 6 votes to evict | **Kieran**; 0 of 5 votes to evict | **Kieran**; 2 of 5 votes to evict | **Mat**; 0 of 3 votes to fake evict | **Sarah**; 1 of 3 votes to fake evict | **Sophie**; Returned to house | **Mat**; 1 of 3 votes to evict | **Sophie**; Chad's choice to save | **Chad**; Most votes to win | |

== Ratings ==
Ratings data is from OzTAM and represents the viewership from the 5 largest Australian metropolitan centres (Sydney, Melbourne, Brisbane, Perth and Adelaide).

| Wk | Ep | Air date | Timeslot | Segment | Overnight ratings | | Consolidated ratings | | Total ratings | | Ref(s) |
| Wk | Ep | Air date | Timeslot | Segment | Viewers | Rank | Viewers | Rank | Viewers | Rank | Ref(s) |
|---|---|---|---|---|---|---|---|---|---|---|---|
| 1 | 1 | 8 June 2020 | Monday 7:30pm | Arrival | 853,000 | 8 | 81,000 (Note: Episode 1 was re-coded into two segments for the timeshift ratings - the arrival and main episode segment was re-coded into one segment titled "Launch".) | 3 | 947,000 | 6 | |
| 1 | 1 | 8 June 2020 | Monday 7:30pm | Episode | 866,000 | 6 | 81,000 | 3 | 947,000 | 6 | |
| 1 | 1 | 8 June 2020 | Monday 7:30pm | Eviction | 930,000 | 5 | 78,000 | 5 | 1,008,000 | 5 | |
| 1 | 2 | 9 June 2020 | Tuesday 7:30pm | Episode | 817,000 | 7 | 93,000 | 1 | 910,000 | 7 | |
| 1 | 2 | 9 June 2020 | Tuesday 7:30pm | Eviction | 842,000 | 6 | 72,000 | 2 | 914,000 | 6 | |
| 1 | 3 | 10 June 2020 | Wednesday 7:30pm | Episode | 748,000 | 8 | 90,000 | 1 | 838,000 | 7 | |
| 1 | 3 | 10 June 2020 | Wednesday 7:30pm | Eviction | 805,000 | 6 | 84,000 | 2 | 889,000 | 6 | |
| 2 | 4 | 14 June 2020 | Sunday 7:00pm | Episode | 680,000 | 7 | 75,000 | 4 | 755,000 | 7 | |
| 2 | 4 | 14 June 2020 | Sunday 7:00pm | Eviction | 695,000 | 6 | 65,000 | 6 | 760,000 | 6 | |
| 2 | 5 | 15 June 2020 | Monday 7:30pm | Episode | 658,000 | 12 | 87,000 | 3 | 745,000 | 11 | |
| 2 | 5 | 15 June 2020 | Monday 7:30pm | Eviction | 655,000 | 13 | 92,000 | 4 | 747,000 | 10 | |
| 2 | 6 | 16 June 2020 | Tuesday 7:30pm | Episode | 777,000 | 7 | 94,000 | 1 | 871,000 | 7 | |
| 2 | 6 | 16 June 2020 | Tuesday 7:30pm | Eviction | 807,000 | 6 | 86,000 | 3 | 892,000 | 6 | |
| 3 | 7 | 21 June 2020 | Sunday 7:00pm | Episode | 751,000 | 5 | 89,000 | 4 | 840,000 | 5 | |
| 3 | 7 | 21 June 2020 | Sunday 7:00pm | Eviction | 721,000 | 6 | 72,000 | 6 | 793,000 | 6 | |
| 3 | 8 | 22 June 2020 | Monday 7:30pm | Episode | 719,000 | 11 | 98,000 | 3 | 817,000 | 10 | |
| 3 | 8 | 22 June 2020 | Monday 7:30pm | Eviction | 744,000 | 10 | 81,000 | 4 | 825,000 | 9 | |
| 3 | 9 | 23 June 2020 | Tuesday 7:30pm | Episode | 713,000 | 8 | 114,000 | 1 | 827,000 | 6 | |
| 3 | 9 | 23 June 2020 | Tuesday 7:30pm | Eviction | 739,000 | 7 | 88,000 | 2 | 827,000 | 7 | |
| 4 | 10 | 28 June 2020 | Sunday 7:00pm | | 701,000 | 6 | 83,000 | 3 | 784,000 | 5 | |
| 4 | 11 | 29 June 2020 | Monday 7:30pm | | 686,000 | 11 | 94,000 | 2 | 780,000 | 10 | |
| 4 | 12 | 30 June 2020 | Tuesday 7:30pm | | 695,000 | 9 | 91,000 | 1 | 786,000 | 7 | |
| 5 | 13 | 5 July 2020 | Sunday 7:00pm | | 695,000 | 7 | 93,000 | 2 | 787,000 | 5 | |
| 5 | 14 | 6 July 2020 | Monday 7:30pm | | 664,000 | 11 | 91,000 | 2 | 755,000 | 10 | |
| 5 | 15 | 7 July 2020 | Tuesday 7:30pm | | 695,000 | 9 | 97,000 | 1 | 792,000 | 7 | |
| 6 | 16 | 13 July 2020 | Monday 7:30pm | | 723,000 | 10 | 70,000 | 3 | 793,000 | 10 | |
| 6 | 17 | 14 July 2020 | Tuesday 7:30pm | | 714,000 | 9 | 89,000 | 1 | 803,000 | 7 | |
| 6 | 18 | 15 July 2020 | Wednesday 7:30pm | | 711,000 | 7 | 94,000 | 2 | 805,000 | 6 | |
| 7 | 19 | 20 July 2020 | Monday 7:30pm | | 712,000 | 10 | 49,000 | 5 | 761,000 | 10 | |
| 7 | 20 | 21 July 2020 | Tuesday 7:30pm | | 832,000 | 5 | 49,000 | 4 | 881,000 | 5 | |
| 7 | 21 | 22 July 2020 | Wednesday 7:30pm | Finale | 769,000 | 7 | 29,000 | 6 | 798,000 | 8 | |
| 7 | 21 | 22 July 2020 | Wednesday 7:30pm | Winner Announced | 876,000 | 5 | 29,000 | 7 | 905,000 | 5 | |
