= The Block (Australian TV series) =

Australian reality television series

- Created by: Julian Cress; David Barbour
- Presented by: Jamie Durie (2003–2004); Scott Cam (2010–present); Shelley Craft (2011–present)
- Starring: Foreman: Keith Schleiger; Dan Reilly
- Judges: John McGrath; Neale Whitaker; Shaynna Blaze; Darren Palmer; Marty Fox
- Opening theme: "Here Comes Another One" by Groove Terminator; Original version (seasons 1–5); Remixed editions (season 6–13)
- Country of origin: Australia
- Original language: English
- No. of seasons: 23
- No. of episodes: 1,059

Production
- Executive producers: Julian Cress; Justin Sturzaker
- Production locations: Sydney (seasons 1–3, 6); Melbourne (seasons 4–5, 7–present)
- Running time: 30–90 mins (including ads)
- Production companies: Watercress Productions (seasons 4–11); Cavalier Productions (seasons 12–present)

Original release
- Network: Nine Network
- Release: 1 June 2003 – 25 July 2004
- Release: 22 September 2010 – present

The Block is an Australian reality television series broadcast on the Nine Network. The series follows four or five couples as they compete against each other to renovate and style houses/apartments and sell them at auction for the highest price.

The original series first ran for two consecutive seasons in 2003 and 2004, and was originally hosted by Jamie Durie.

The Nine Network revived The Block after a six-year absence, with a third season commenced airing on 22 September 2010, this time hosted by television personality and builder Scott Cam. Shelley Craft joined as co-host from the fourth season.

The Block has a large number of commercial sponsors and prominently features brand sponsorships regularly throughout episodes.

== Format ==
The original format of the series featured four couples with a prior relationship renovating a derelict apartment block in the Sydney suburb of Bondi, with each couple renovating a separate apartment over a period of 12 weeks and with a budget of A$40,000. The apartments were then sold at auction, with each couple keeping any profit made above a set reserve price and the couple with the highest profit winning a A$100,000 prize. The current format is relatively the same except the series usually features five couples, it is mainly based in Melbourne suburbs and the budget is $100,000+.

The first season was filmed at Bondi and the second at Manly. The third season again took place in Sydney, in the suburb of Vaucluse. Moving to Victoria, the fourth season was filmed in the Melbourne suburb of Richmond, Victoria on Cameron Street. Breaking with tradition, season four was filmed in four side-by-side houses as opposed to an apartment block of four. Season four saw television personality Shelley Craft join Scott Cam in hosting the show.

Season five began airing in April 2012. As with season four, season five has retained the four separate houses format, as opposed to four apartments in a single apartment block as in earlier seasons. Season five is again set in Melbourne, on Dorcas Street, and is set in four adjacent multi-storey town houses. Season six returned to Sydney, in Bondi, for the tenth anniversary. The program has remained in Melbourne since season seven.

The first three seasons of The Block aired once weekly for 13, 26 and 9 weeks respectively. Since season four, the program has aired across multiple nights per week.

== Hosts and judges ==
Timeline of hosts, judges and other personnel
Starring	Seasons																					
Starring	1	2	3	4	5	6	7	8	9	10	11	12	13	14	15	16	17	18	19	20	21	22
Hosts
Jamie Durie	Host	Host																				
Scott Cam			Host	Host	Host	Host	Host	Host	Host	Host	Host	Host	Host	Host	Host	Host	Host	Host	Host	Host	Host	Host
Shelley Craft				Host / Challenge Master	Host / Challenge Master	Host / Challenge Master	Host / Challenge Master	Host / Challenge Master	Host / Challenge Master	Host / Challenge Master	Host / Challenge Master	Host / Challenge Master	Host / Challenge Master	Host / Challenge Master	Host / Challenge Master	Host / Challenge Master	Host / Challenge Master	Host / Challenge Master	Host / Challenge Master	Host / Challenge Master	Host / Challenge Master	Host / Challenge Master
Judges
John McGrath	Judge	Judge	Judge	Judge	Judge	Guest				Guest		Guest	Guest	Guest								
Neale Whitaker			Judge	Judge	Judge	Judge	Judge	Judge	Judge	Judge	Judge	Judge	Judge	Judge	Judge	Judge	Judge	Judge	Guest	Guest	Guest	Guest
Shaynna Blaze					Judge	Judge	Judge	Judge	Judge	Judge	Judge	Judge	Judge	Judge	Judge	Judge	Judge	Judge	Judge	Judge	Judge	Judge
Darren Palmer				Guest	Guest	Judge	Judge	Judge	Judge	Judge	Judge	Judge	Judge	Judge	Judge	Judge	Judge	Judge	Judge	Judge	Judge	Judge
Marty Fox																Agent		Agent	Judge	Judge	Judge	Judge
Foremen
Keith Schleiger				Foreman	Foreman	Foreman	Foreman	Foreman	Foreman	Foreman	Foreman	Foreman	Foreman	Foreman	Foreman	Foreman	Foreman	Foreman	Foreman	Guest		
Dan Reilly					Contestant	Contestant				"Foreboy"	"Foredan"	"Foredan"	"Foredan"	"Foredan"	"Foredan"	"Foredan"	"Foredan"	"Foredan"	"Foredan"	"Foredan"	"Foredan"	"Foredan"

== Series overview ==
Series	Title	Type of building	Location	Episodes	Originally released		Winning team	Winning profit	Total winnings
Series	Title	Type of building	Location	Episodes	First released	Last released	Winning team	Winning profit	Total winnings
1	The Block 2003^{[a]}	Rundown Apartment Complex	Bondi, New South Wales	14	1 June 2003	17 August 2003	Adam Thorn; Fiona Mills	$156,000	$256,000
2	The Block 2004^{[a]}	Rundown Apartment Complex	Manly, New South Wales	26	18 April 2004	25 July 2004	Andrew Rochford; Jamie Nicholson	$78,000	$178,000
3	The Block 2010	Rundown Apartment Complex	Vaucluse, New South Wales	9	22 September 2010	24 November 2010	John and Neisha Pitt	$205,000	$305,000
4	The Block 2011	Rundown Workers Cottages	Richmond, Victoria	51	20 June 2011	21 August 2011	Polly Porter; Warwick "Waz" Jones	$15,000	$115,000
5	The Block 2012	Rundown Terrace Houses	South Melbourne, Victoria	69	16 April 2012	1 July 2012	Brad Cranfield; Lara Welham	$506,000	$606,000
6	All Stars	Rundown Heritage-Listed Semi-Detached Houses	Bondi, New South Wales	39	4 February 2013	20 March 2013	Phil Rankine; Amity Dry	$295,000	$395,000
7	Sky High	Former Motel	South Melbourne, Victoria	68	12 May 2013	28 July 2013	Alisa and Lysandra Fraser	$295,000	$395,000
8	Fans v Faves	Former Warehouse	Albert Park, Victoria	61	27 January 2014	9 April 2014	Steve O'Donnell; Chantelle Ford	$636,000	$736,000
9	Glasshouse	Former Office Building	Prahran, Victoria	65	27 July 2014	12 October 2014	Shannon and Simon Voss	$335,000	$435,000
10	Triple Threat	Former Apartment Block	South Yarra, Victoria	58	27 January 2015	29 April 2015	Darren and Deanne Jolly	$835,000	$935,000
11	Blocktagon^{[c]}	Former Hotel	South Yarra, Victoria	47	6 September 2015	25 November 2015	Dean and Shay Paine	$655,000	$755,000
12	The Block 2016	Heritage Art Deco Building	Port Melbourne, Victoria	46	21 August 2016	13 November 2016	William Bethune; Karlie Cicero	$715,000	$815,000
13	The Block 2017	Rundown Weatherboard Houses	Elsternwick, Victoria	52	30 July 2017	29 October 2017	Elyse Knowles; Josh Barker	$447,000	$547,000
14	The Block 2018	Former Hotel	St Kilda, Victoria	47	5 August 2018	28 October 2018	Hayden and Sara Vale	$545,000	$645,000
15	The Block 2019	Former Hotel	St Kilda, Victoria	57	4 August 2019	10 November 2019	Tess Cattana; Luke Struber	$630,000	$730,000
16	The Block 2020	Rundown Weatherboard Houses from Different Decades	Brighton, Victoria	50	23 August 2020	22 November 2020	Jimmy and Tam Wilkins	$966,000	$1.066m
17	Fans v Faves	Rundown Cul-de-Sac Houses	Hampton, Victoria	50	8 August 2021	7 November 2021	Mitch Edwards; Mark McKie	$644,444.44	$744,444.44
18	Tree Change	Country Houses	Macedon Ranges, Victoria	51	7 August 2022	6 November 2022	Omar Slaimankhel; Ozman 'Oz' Abu Malik	$1,586,666.66	$1,686,666.66
19	The Block 2023	Rundown Brick Houses	Hampton East, Victoria	51	6 August 2023	5 November 2023	Steph and Gian Ottavio	$1.65m	$1.75m
20	The Block XX	Holiday Houses	Phillip Island, Victoria	52	12 August 2024	10 November 2024	Maddy & Charlotte Harry	$1.55m	$1.65m
21	The Block 2025	Country Houses	Daylesford, Victoria	50	27 July 2025	26 October 2025	Britt & Taz Etto	$420,000	$520,000
22	The Block 2026	Beach Houses	Mount Eliza, Victoria	50	2 August 2026	1 November 2026	Courtney Kain & Sev Keser	$1.27m	$1.37m
23	The Block 2027	Heritage buidlings	Sunbury, Victoria	TBA	2027	2027	TBA	TBA	TBA

== Combined profits ==
=== Auction ===
Season		No. of teams	No. of properties sold at auction	After auction sales	Winning prize	Combined auction profit (Note: The combined auction profit excludes the winning prize money and after auction sales.)
1	2003	4		$0	$100,000	$443,000
2	2004	4	2	$0	$100,000	$155,000
3	2010	4	3	$90,000	$100,000	$339,500
4	2011	4	1	$122,000	$100,000	$15,000
5	2012	4		$0	$100,000	$1,723,001
6	2013	4		$0	$100,000	$815,000
7	2013	5		$0	$100,000	$1,283,000
8	2014	4		$0	$100,000	$2,326,500
9	2014	5		$0	$100,000	$705,000
10	2015	4		$0	$100,000	$3,065,000
11	2015	5		$0	$100,000	$2,439,000
12	2016	5		$0	$100,000	$2,835,000
13	2017	5		$0	$100,000	$1,220,000
14	2018	5		$0	$100,000	$1,880,000
15	2019	5		$0	$100,000	$2,292,000
16	2020	5		$0	$100,000	$3,232,002
17	2021	5		$0	$100,000	$2,171,968.12
18	2022	5	2	$339,000.50	$100,000	$1,606,667.65
19	2023	5	4	$155,000	$100,000	$2,895,000
20	2024	5		$0	$100,000	$5,330,000
21	2025	5	3	$0	$100,000	$649,999.1
22	2026	5		$0	$100,000	$3,547,000
Overall combined profit						$40,968,637.87
Including prize money ($2,200,000)						$43,168,637.87
Including after auction sales ($551,000.50)						$43,719,638.37

=== Returning teams ===
Contestants	Relationship	Original season		Returning season		Combined profit
Mitch Edwards & Mark Mckie	Partners	15	$384,000	17	$644,444.44	$1,028,444.44
Alisa & Lysandra Fraser	Twin sisters	7	$395,000	8	$616,000	$1.011m^{3}
Darren & Deanne Jolly	Married with children	9	$10,000	10	$935,000	$945,000
Brad Cranfield & Dale Vine^{2}	Best mates	5	$606,000 & $355,000	8	$507,250^{3}	$859,625 & $608,625
Dan & Dani Reilly	Married	5	$448,000	6	$220,000	$668,000
Georgia & Ronnie Caceres	Married with children	13	$161,000	17	$296,000	$457,000
Phil Rankin & Amity Dry	Married with children	1	$60,000	6	$395,000	$455,000
Josh & Jenna Densten	Married	4	$50,000	6	$275,000	$325,000
Mark Bowyer & Duncan Miller	Best mates	3	$47,000	6	$25,000	$72,000^{3}

- ^2 Brad & Dale were both contestants on Season 5, but they were with their partners (Lara & Sophie respectively). In Season 8, they returned to the show as a team.
- ^3 This amount of money is split between the two contestants in the team.

== Season synopsis ==
=== Season 1 ===
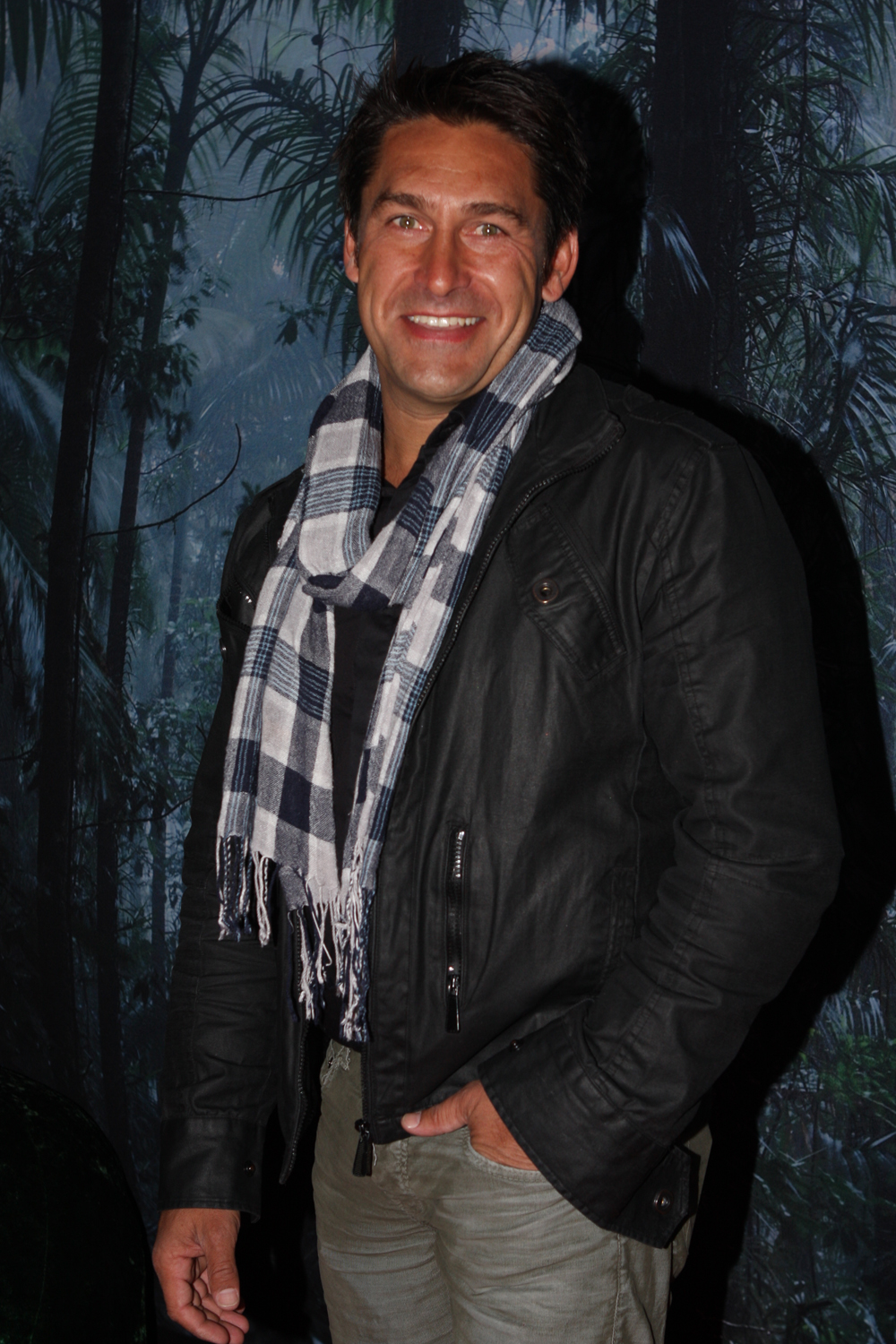
Jamie Durie hosted the first two seasons of the show.

The first season of The Block began airing on 1 June 2003 on the Nine Network, replacing Backyard Blitz and Location Location in the network's flagship time slot of Sunday at 6:30 to 7:30 pm (AEST). The season was presented by Backyard Blitz host Jamie Durie and filmed in Bondi, New South Wales, with the majority of filming being completed prior to the series airing for editing purposes.

Selected from approximately 2,000 applicants, the four couples in the season were:

- Adam Thorn (aged 30) and Fiona Mills (27), a married couple from Banksia. A data analyst and former sales representative, the couple had renovated three properties prior to competing on The Block. They renovated the first ground-floor apartment (flat number one) and were widely considered the "show favourites" throughout the course of the season. Their apartment—which was the last to be auctioned—sold for $751,000 earning them the highest profit of $156,000 as well as the winning prize of $100,000. Mills appeared on the cover of Ralph while the season was airing in July 2003.
- Warren Sonin (37) and Gavin Atkins (35), a sales manager and public relations manager from Elizabeth Bay, New South Wales. They are the first male same-sex couple to compete on The Block.
- Paul and Kylie Ingram
- Phil Rankine and Amity Dry

The auction profits had a combined result of $443,000.

Flat	Auction spot	Couple	Reserve	Auction result	Profit	Total winnings	Placing spot
1	4	Adam & Fiona	$595,000	$751,000	$156,000	$256,000	1st
2	2	Warren & Gavin	$595,000	$670,000	$75,000	$75,000	3rd
3	1	Phil & Amity	$595,000	$655,000	$60,000	$60,000	4th
4	3	Paul & Kylie	$595,000	$747,000	$152,000	$152,000	2nd

=== Season 2 ===
The site used for the second season, as seen several days prior to auction

Following the success of the first season, an expanded second season of 26 episodes, airing twice weekly, premiered on 18 April 2004. The season was again set in Sydney, although in the suburb of Manly rather than Bondi where the first season was located.

The auction profits had a combined result of $155,000 with two properties not selling at auction.

Selected from over 18,000 applicants, the four couples in the season were:

Flat	Auction spot	Couple	Reserve	Auction result	Profit	Total winnings	Placing spot
1	2	Jason & Kirsten	$795,000	$872,000	$77,000	$77,000	2nd
2	3	Andrew & Jamie	$790,000	$868,000	$78,000	$178,000	1st
3	1	Matt & Jane	$795,000	$795,000	$0	$0	3rd (tied)
4	4	Steven & Richard	$800,000	$800,000	$0	$0	3rd (tied)

Two original contestants, Dani and Monique Bacha, left the program in January 2004, two weeks into the second season, when it was reported that Dani had spent six months in jail in 2002 following his conviction for a drug-related offence. Andrew Rochford and Jamie Nicholson replaced Dani and Monique Bacha.

=== Season 3 ===
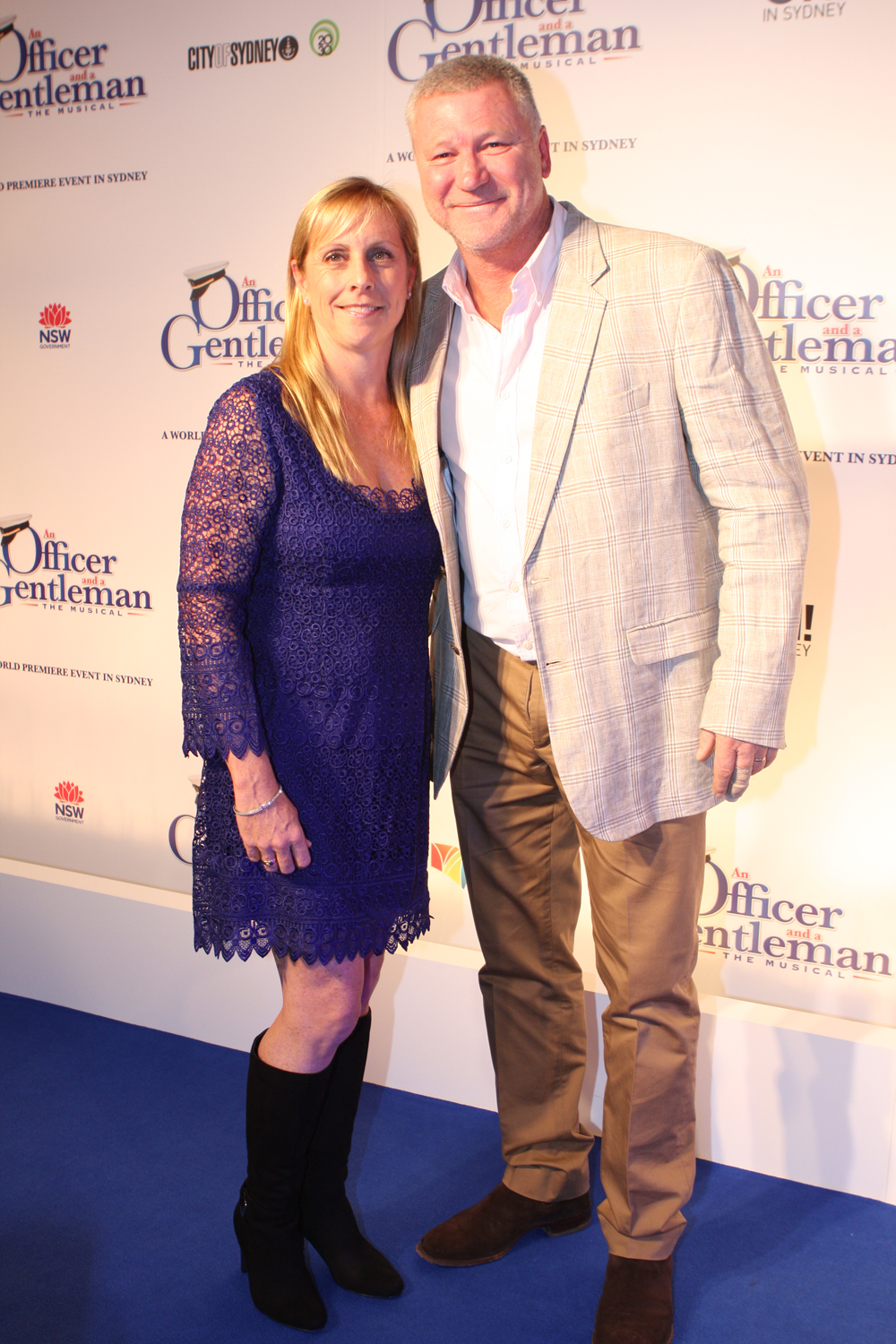
Scott Cam (right), host since 2010

After a long break, the series was revived in 2010 with a set of four apartments in the upmarket suburb of Vaucluse in Sydney being renovated and Scott Cam replacing Jamie Durie as host.

The auction profits had a combined result of $339,500 with only one property not selling at auction.

Flat	Auction spot	Couple	Reserve	Auction result	Amount sold for after Auction	Profit	Total winnings	Placing spot
1	1	Josh & Nisha	$900,000	$1.105m	N/A	$205,000	$305,000	1st
2	2	Mark & Duncan	$860,000	$907,000	N/A	$47,000	$47,000	3rd
3	4	Erin & Jake	$910,000	$997,500	N/A	$87,500	$87,500	2nd
4	3	Chez & Brenton	$880,000	Passed in	$970,000	$90,000	$90,000	4th

=== Season 4 ===
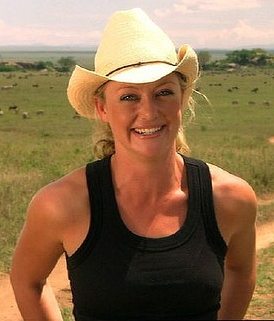
Shelley Craft joined Scott Cam as a host from the fourth season onwards.

Season four saw six major changes to the format of The Block.

- The location has changed to Melbourne instead of Sydney.
- An initial elimination week sees eight couples reduced to four.
- Instead of a block of flats with four apartments, there are four separate houses next to one another.
- Contestants now have to renovate the exterior of their home, in addition to the interior.
- Contestants no longer work at their jobs during the week, they now renovate full time.
- Instead of two one-hour-long episodes airing per week, six episodes now air per week with a mix of one-hour- and half-hour-length episodes.
- Shelley Craft has been introduced to help host special challenges where contestants can win extra cash and prizes for their houses.
- A weekly episode named "The Blocked: Unlocked" was introduced. Hosted by Shelley Craft, the episode shares a personal insight into The Block transformations as the couples guide viewers through their completed rooms. It also includes behind the scenes footage and footage not seen on the main show.

Eight couples were initially selected, with four being eliminated and the other four being given keys to the houses. The four remaining teams are:

- Josh and Jenna – House 1 (blue)
- Polly and Waz – House 2 (yellow)
- Katrina and Amie – House 3 (green)
- Rod and Tanya – House 4 (red)

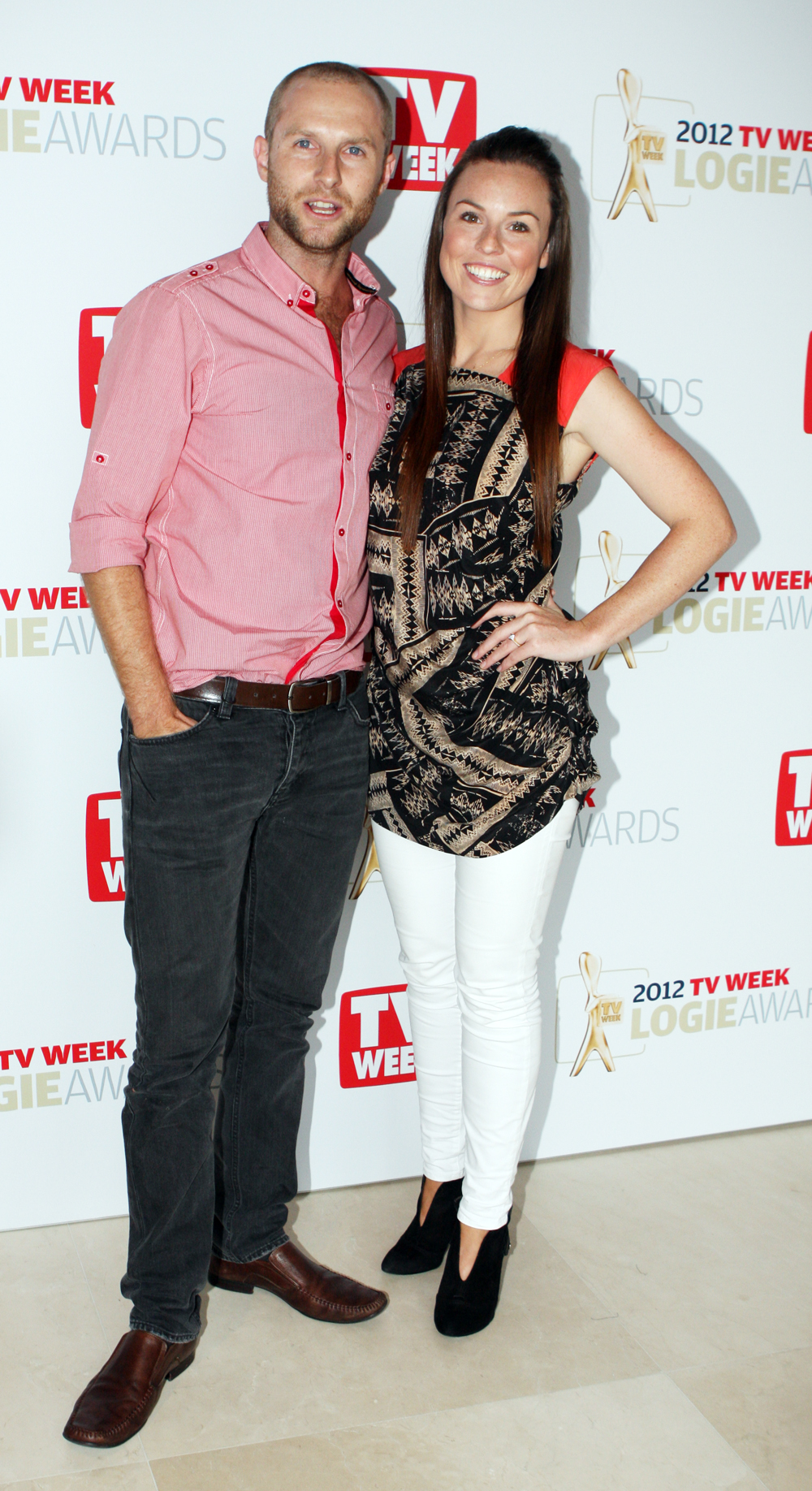
Waz Jones and Polly Porter, winners of the fourth season of The Block

The winners of The Block were Polly and Waz. They made $15,000 in profit, and won the $100,000 grand prize, due to the other three couples' houses being passed in. In this finale episode, Josh proposed to Jenna, his girlfriend for five years and partner on The Block.

This was the worst auction in the history of The Block with auction profits having a combined result of $15,000 due to only one property selling at auction.

House	Auction spot	Couple	Reserve	Auction result	Amount sold for after Auction	Profit	Total winnings	Placing spot
1	1	Josh & Jenna	$950,000	Passed in	$1.000m	$50,000	$50,000	2nd (tied)
2	2	Polly & Waz	$840,000	$855,000	N/A	$15,000	$115,000	1st
3	3	Amie & Katrina	$860,000	Passed in	$860,000	$0	$0	2nd (tied)
4	4	Rod & Tania	$850,000	Passed in	$922,000	$72,000	$72,000	2nd (tied)

Polly and Waz were the only couple whose property sold at auction, with the other three failing to meet their reserve prices. Following the auction, Amie and Katrina's property sold for their exact reserve amount, meaning they would not take any winnings from appearing on The Block. Also, Rod and Tania's property sold for the highest profit on The Block, at $72,000 (however, as it was after the auction, Polly and Waz are still the winners).

=== Season 5 ===
This season, like season four, was also based in Melbourne, in the inner city suburb of South Melbourne with four double storey side by side terrace houses located at 401 – 407 Dorcas Street. The properties are all on separate titles with car access from Montague Street and plans approved to allow for a third story extension.

Eight couples were initially selected, with four being eliminated and the other four being given keys to the houses. The four remaining teams are:

- Dale and Sophie – House 1 (blue)
- Mike and Andrew – House 2 (yellow)
- Brad and Lara – House 3 (green)
- Dan and Dani – House 4 (red)

The auction profits had a combined result of $1,723,001.01

House	Auction spot	Couple	Reserve	Auction result	Profit	Total winnings	Placing spot
1	3	Dale & Sophie	$975,000	$1.330m	$335,000	$335,000	4th
2	4	Mike & Andrew	$966,000	$1,400,001.01	$434,001.01	$434,001.01	3rd
3	1	Brad & Lara	$1.114m	$1.620m	$506,000	$606,000	1st
4	2	Dan & Dani	$992,000	$1.440m	$448,000	$448,000	2nd

=== Season 6 ===
It was announced during the finale of the fifth season that an all-star edition of the series would air in 2013, with viewers able to vote for couples to return from past seasons. These votes were taken into consideration when selecting the contestants, and the four returning couples were announced in October 2012 as Phil and Amity (of season one), Mark and Duncan (season three), Josh and Jenna (season four) and Dan and Dani (season five). Phil and Amity won All Stars with a total of $1,670,000 selling for their home. The auction profits had a combined result of $815,000.

Production for the series relocated from Melbourne—which had hosted the prior two seasons—to its original location of Bondi in Sydney to celebrate the tenth anniversary of the show's first season. Filming took place over nine weeks from October to December 2012.

Darren Palmer, who was a guest judge in the fourth and fifth seasons, replaced John McGrath as a permanent judge for this season. Both Neale Whitaker and Shaynna Blaze reprised their roles as judges from the previous season.

House	Auction spot	Couple	Reserve	Auction result	Profit	Total winnings	Placing spot
1	4	Phil & Amity	$1.375m	$1.670m	$295,000	$395,000	1st
2	2	Mark & Duncan (& Dale)	$1.345m	$1.370m	$25,000	$25,000	4th
3	1	Josh & Jenna	$1.375m	$1.650m	$275,000	$275,000	2nd
4	3	Dan & Dani	$1.355m	$1.575m	$220,000	$220,000	3rd

=== Season 7 ===
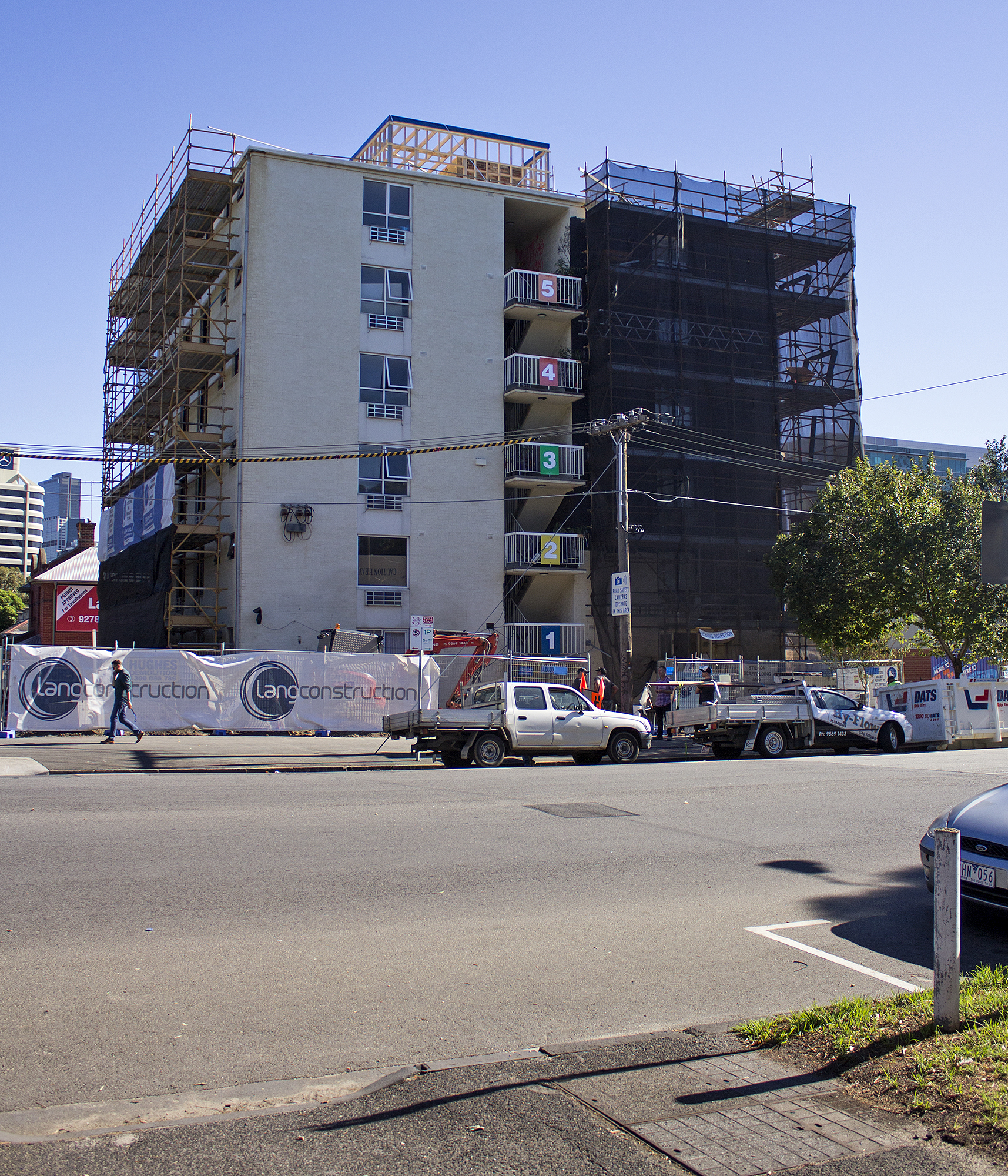
"The Block: Sky High" under construction

The Nine Network renewed The Block for a seventh season to air after Easter in 2013. The location for this season was 142 Park Street, South Melbourne. The building consists of 5 levels, with each couple allocated a full level to renovate. Alisa and Lysandra renovated level 1, Matt and Kim were responsible for level 2, level 3 was occupied by Bec and George, level 4 was completed by Madi and Jarrod and level 5 was made over by Trixie and Johnno.

Twin sisters Alisa and Lysandra won The Block, with a profit of $295,000. The auction profits had a combined result of $1,283,000.

Level	Auction spot	Couple	Reserve	Auction result	Profit	Total winnings	Placing spot
1	1	Alisa & Lysandra	$1.140m	$1.435m	$295,000	$395,000	1st
2	5	Matt & Kim	$1.205m	$1.455m	$250,000	$250,000	3rd
3	4	Bec & George	$1.265m	$1.507m	$242,000	$242,000	4th
4	3	Madi & Jarrod	$1.310m	$1.601m	$291,000	$291,000	2nd
5	2	Johnno & Trixie	$1.400m	$1.605m	$205,000	$205,000	5th

• Alisa & Lysandra win The Block with a $4000 profit lead over Madi & Jarrod.

=== Season 8 ===
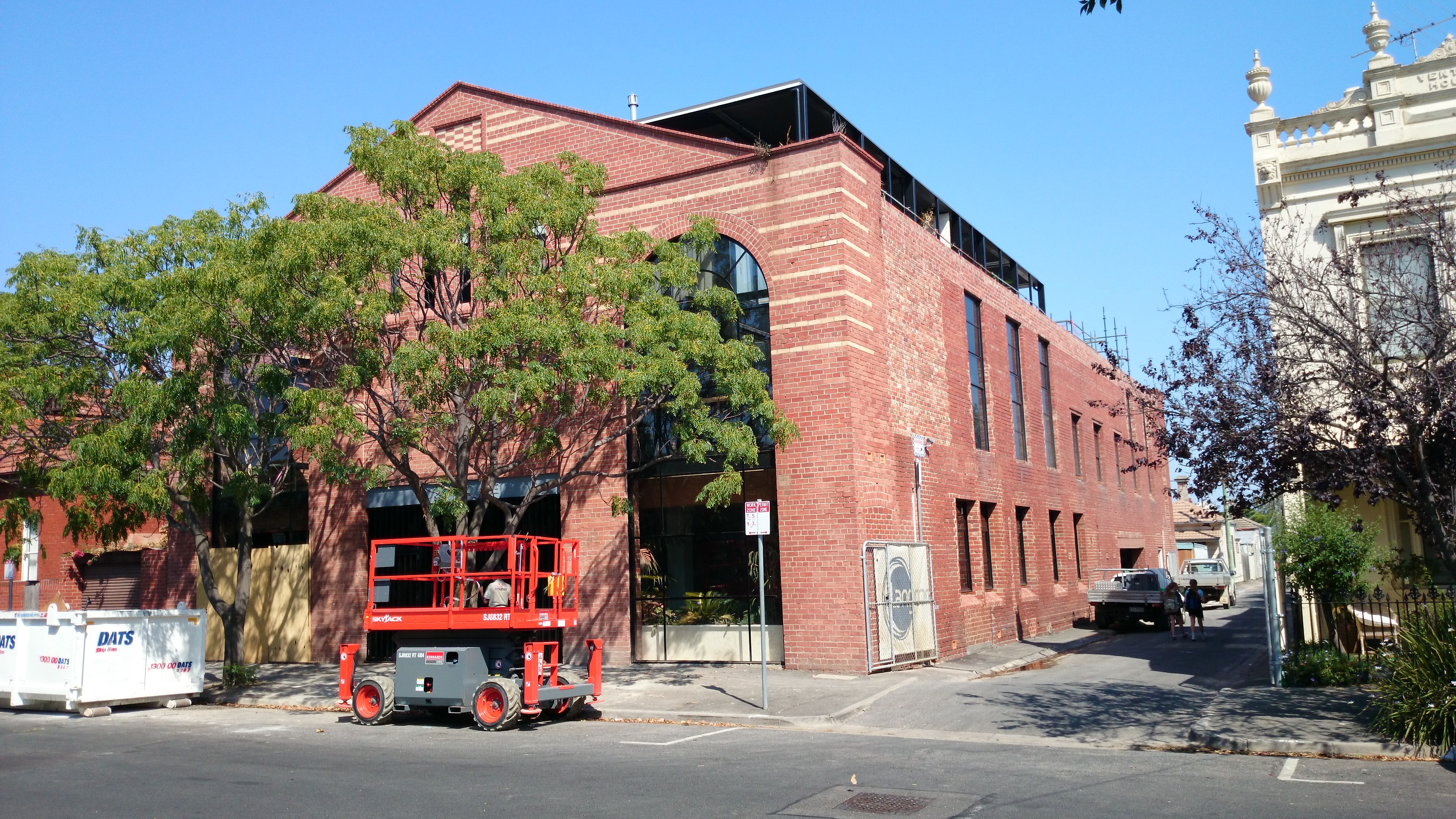
"Dux House" in February 2014

Applications for the eighth season of the series opened whilst the seventh season was airing, with couples aged between 18 and 65 years old being sought by casting agents. Filming for the season was scheduled to occur between November 2013 and January 2014, and aired from 27 January 2014.

Season 8 was based in the Melbourne suburb of Albert Park, Victoria. The production company paid $5.9 million for 47 O’Grady Street, a brick warehouse that was then transformed into four luxury apartments.

The working title of season 8 was "Fans vs Favourites" as shown in the 2014 preview that was aired on the Big Brother 2013 finale. Returning to The Block were Brad and Dale (season 5) / Alisa and Lysandra (season 7). Joining The Block were The Super K's – Kyal and Kara, and The Retro Rookies – Steve and Chantelle. Steve O'Donnell and Chantelle Ford won The Block with a profit of $636,000 + $100,000 winners' prize money. The auction profits had a combined result of $2,326,500.

Loft	Auction spot	Couple	Reserve	Auction result	Profit	Total winnings	Placing spot
1	4	Steve & Chantelle	$1.834m	$2.470m	$636,000	$736,000	1st
2	2	Kyal & Kara	$1.872m	$2.440m	$567,250	$567,250	3rd
3	3	Alisa & Lysandra	$1.759m	$2.375m	$616,000	$616,000	2nd
4	1	Brad & Dale	$1.802m	$2.310m	$507,250	$507,250	4th

In May 2014, Lukas Kamay – who had won the auction for Alisa and Lysandra's apartment – was arrested for his involvement in an insider trading scam, for which he was later convicted and jailed. Commonwealth Director of Public Prosecutions Robert Bromwich told the court that the apartment purchase gave Kamay's crimes "a cloak of respectability". The sale agreement was broken, with the apartment to be re-sold at a later date.

=== Season 9 ===
The ninth season of The Block featured contestants renovating a former office building in Prahran into luxury apartments, with the season subtitled as The Block: Glasshouse. Filming began in April 2014. One of the contestants was former professional Australian rules footballer Darren Jolly and his wife Deanne as one of the couples. The season debuted on 27 July 2014 at the 6:30 time slot.

Shannon and Simon Voss won The Block with a profit of $335,000 + $100,000 winners' prize money, while Michael & Carlene and Darren & Deanne made the bare minimum of $10,000 above reserve. Even newly-weds Karstan & Maxine only netted $40,000 in winnings. The auction profits had combined results of $705,000.

Apt	Auction spot	Couple	Reserve	Auction result	Profit	Total winnings	Placing spot
1	5	Michael & Carlene	$1.380m	$1.390m	$10,000	$10,000	4th (tied)
2	1	Chris & Jenna	$1.500m	$1.810m	$310,000	$310,000	2nd
3	3	Max & Karstan	$1.670m	$1.710m	$40,000	$40,000	3rd
4	2	Simon & Shannon	$1.565m	$1.900m	$335,000	$435,000	1st
5	4	Darren & Deanne	$1.370m	$1.380m	$10,000	$10,000	4th (tied)

=== Season 10 ===
The Block was renewed for a Tenth season which was to begin airing on 27 January 2015.

The working title of season 10 was "Triple Threat" as shown in the 2014 preview that was aired on 23 November 2014. It was premiered on 27 January 2015 where contestants renovate a former three-level block of flats. Darren & Deanne (season 9), Bec & George and Matt & Kim (both season 7) returned to vie for a spot as contestants. Former contestant Dan Reilly from seasons 5 and 6 returned, this time as an apprentice foreman ("foreboy") under Keith's guidance after Dan himself became a qualified builder, who was a qualified carpenter during his stints as a contestant.

Former contestants Darren & Deanne won the season with $835,000 + $100,000 prize money, and all contestants won over $665,000. The auction profits had a combined result of $3,065,000.

Apt	Auction spot	Couple	Reserve	Auction Result	Profit	Total winnings	Placing spot
1	4	Josh & Charlotte	$1.390m	$2.200m	$810,000	$810,000	2nd
2	1	Tim & Anastasia	$1.420m	$2.175m	$755,000	$755,000	3rd
3	2	Ayden & Jess	$1.335m	$2.000m	$665,000	$665,000	4th
4	3	Darren & Deanne	$1.455m	$2.290m	$835,000	$935,000	1st

=== Season 11 ===
The Block was renewed for an eleventh season, which went into production in May 2015. Season 11 put the show 'back-to-basics' after ratings declines during the tenth season; episodes were cut from 90 to 60 minutes, fewer episodes, the eliminations were removed and Thursday night episodes were dropped.

Filming for season 11 began on 15 May 2015. This season renovated the former Hotel Saville in South Yarra – an octagonal, eight floor brick building. The title for Season 11 is "The Block: Blocktagon".

Co-creator Julian Cress said that this season of The Block would have no tradies and only passionate do-it-yourself couples. In other seasons, at least one person in each team had a trade. The change came in the new direction in the back-to-basics change to the season. Cress said viewers would relate more to the characters who are big on spirit but small on skills when the show returned later in the year.

This season was sponsored by Mitre 10 (building equipment), Swisse Australia (vitamins), Aldi (groceries), Domain (money and apartment information), The Good Guys (electronics and kitchens) and Suzuki (transport).

Shay & Dean Paine won the season with $655,000 + $100,000 prize money, and all contestants won over $349,000. The auction profits had a combined result of $2,439,000.

Level	Auction spot	Couple	Reserve	Auction result	Profit	Total winnings	Placing spot
1	1	Kingi & Caro	$1.330m	$1.735m	$405,000	$405,000	3rd
2	4	Andrew & Whitney	$1.400m	$1.790m	$390,000	$390,000	4th
3	2	Suzi & Voni	$1.480m	$1.829m	$349,000	$349,000	5th
4	5	Luke & Ebony	$1.560m	$2.200m	$640,000	$640,000	2nd
5	3	Dean & Shay	$1.645m	$2.300m	$655,000	$755,000	1st

=== Season 12 ===
On 28 October 2015, Nine renewed the series for a twelfth season. Since 2013, the Nine Network had aired two seasons of the show each year. In 2016, however, this would be the one and only season airing, and it did not air until the last quarter of 2016. It was once again set in Melbourne. On 27 December 2015, Frank Valentic teased a video saying that there are rumours of The Block going to Greville Street, Prahran.

On 18 February 2016, it was reported that The Block's producers had bought an old heritage-listed soap factory for $5 million at 164 Ingles Street, Port Melbourne. This address was confirmed by Scott Cam on The Today Show on 9 May 2016. Filming began on 26 May 2016. The series began airing in August 2016 and had 5 teams competing. The season premiered on Sunday 21 August 2016. This season's contestants, Julia & Sasha, are the first ever female same-sex couple to compete on any season of The Block. The season concluded on 13 November 2016.

This season is sponsored by Mitre 10 (building equipment), Aldi (groceries), Domain (cash flow and apartment information), McCafé (snacks, beverages, and the McCafe Quality Award), Stayz (challenge and additional finale prizes), Suzuki (transport and viewer voting prize) and Telstra (Smart Home Technology and additional cash flow).

William Bethune & Karlie Cicero won the season with $715,000 + $100,000 prize money. Each team of contestants won $425,000 or more. The auction profits had a combined result of $2,835,000.

Apt	Auction spot	Couple	Reserve	Auction result	Profit	Total winnings	Placing spot
1	1	William & Karlie	$1.885m	$2.600m	$715,000	$815,000	1st
2	3	Dan & Carleen	$1.775m	$2.300m	$525,000	$525,000	3rd
3	5	Andy & Ben	$1.740m	$2.250m	$510,000	$510,000	4th
4	2	Julia & Sasha	$1.930m	$2.590m	$660,000	$660,000	2nd
5	4	Chris & Kim	$1.880m	$2.305m	$425,000	$425,000	5th

=== Season 13 ===
On 8 November 2016, The Block was renewed for a thirteenth season at Nine's upfronts. Applications for the thirteenth season of the series opened on 9 January 2017, with energetic couples aged between 18 and 65 years old being sought by casting agents. Filming for the season is scheduled to occur between April 2017 and July 2017. The casting call also specifies first round couples will be reduced to final participants in the first week of filming, which suggests Season 13 will feature an elimination round similar to that of Season 5.

On 11 March 2017, it was reported that a vacant block of land at 46 Regent Street, Elsternwick, had been purchased for $9.6 million back in December 2016, with plans approved to build a five lot subdivision, meaning for the first time ever, they would be building a property from the ground up, instead of renovating an existing building. On 17 March 2017, it was officially confirmed that 46 Regent Street Elsternwick will be the location of The Block's thirteenth season with filming to begin on 27 April 2017, however they will not be building a property from the ground up, as five old rundown weatherboard houses are being relocated to the location, meaning this will be the first time since the sixth season the contestants will renovate a house.

In June 2017, Network Nine officially announced the location and teams for the thirteenth season of The Block, one team being Aussie Model Elyse Knowles and her Boyfriend Josh. The season will premiere on Sunday 30 July 2017.

This season is sponsored by Mitre 10 (building equipment), Domain (cash flow & house marketing), McCafé (snacks & beverages), Stayz (challenge & additional finale prizes), Volkswagen (transport & cash flow), Centrum (vitamins) & Youfoodz (groceries & meals).

Elyse Knowles & Josh Barker won the season with $447,000 + $100,000 prize money. Each team of contestants won $95,000 or more. The auction profits had a combined result of $1,220,000.

House	Auction spot	Couple	Reserve	Auction result	Profit	Total winnings	Placing spot
1	2	Jason & Sarah	$2.620m	$3.007m	$387,000	$387,000	2nd
2	5	Clint & Hannah	$2.520m	$2.615m	$95,000	$95,000	5th
3	4	Georgia & Ronnie	$2.620m	$2.781m	$161,000	$161,000	3rd
4	3	Sticks & Wombat	$2.520m	$2.650m	$130,000	$130,000	4th
5	1	Elyse & Josh	$2.620m	$3.067m	$447,000	$547,000	1st

=== Season 14 ===
On 21 November 2016, it was reported the producers were looking at The Gatwick Private Hotel at 34 Fitzroy Street, St Kilda as a possible site for its thirteenth season. On 17 December 2016, it was reported that The Block producers and the owners of The Gatwick Hotel are currently in negotiations on purchasing the property. On 4 March 2017, it was reported that the Gatwick Hotel deal did not go ahead and that the producers are searching for another property, however on 6 March 2017, it was reported the producers were in a closing deal to buy the property as residents of the building are to move out. On 17 March 2017, it was reported that The Gatwick Hotel would not be the location of The Block's thirteenth season, although there was still interest in the building. On 22 March 2017, Nine officially confirmed that the building had been purchased and will be used for a future season of The Block.

In June 2017, The Block producers lodged renovation plans for The Gatwick Hotel with Port Phillip City Council. On 23 July 2017, the renovation plans were officially released, the information included that the network paid $10 million for the building (not $15 million as originally reported), it was confirmed that the site will have eight apartments, two-bedrooms on the ground level and three-bedrooms for the remaining homes, the existing roof to be partly demolished and a fourth floor built to include pergolas above outdoor terraces & a car park area would have six car spaces and bicycle parking, and each apartment would come with secure storage.

Applications for the fourteenth season of the series opened in August 2017 until 10 September 2017, looking for couples aged between 18 and 65 years old being sought by casting agents. Filming for the season was originally slated to occur between January 2018 and April 2018, but will begin filming on 8 February 2018. In October 2017, the fourteenth season and location of The Block were officially confirmed at Nine's upfronts. In June 2018, Network Nine announced the teams for the fourteenth season of The Block. In July 2018, Network Nine announced the premiere date of Season 14 as Sunday, 5 August at 7pm.

This season is sponsored by Mitre 10 (building equipment), Domain (cash flow & house marketing), McCafé (snacks & beverages), Volkswagen (transport & cash flow), Youfoodz (groceries & meals) & BlueScope Steel (housing foundation, weekly viewer's choice voting & promotion).

Hayden Vale & Sara Tumino won the season with $545,000 + $100,000 prize money. Each team of contestants won $209,000 or more. The auction profits had a combined result of $1,880,000.

Apt	Auction spot	Couple	Reserve	Auction result	Profit	Total winnings	Placing spot
1	1	Kerrie & Spence	$2.435m	$2.850m	$415,000	$415,000	2nd
2	5	Hans & Courtney	$2.360m	$2.770m	$410,000	$410,000	3rd
3	2	Hayden & Sara	$2.475m	$3.020m	$545,000	$645,000	1st
4	3	Norm & Jess	$2.650m	$2.859m	$209,000	$209,000	5th
5	4	Bianca & Carla	$2.690m	$2.991m	$301,000	$301,000	4th

=== Season 15 ===
In June 2018, it was reported that The Block producers had acquired a rundown backpackers accommodation, Oslo Hotel, at 38 Grey Street, St Kilda, through an off-market deal struck after the series approached one of the owners. The building contains five mansions hidden behind the facade. The series producers and building planners set to submit renovation plans to the City of Port Phillip council imminently. In October 2018, the Oslo Hotel was confirmed as the next location for renovation, Nine Network acquired the building for $10.8 million.

In July 2019, Network Nine announced the teams for the fifteenth season of The Block and announced the premiere date as Sunday, 4 August at 7pm.

This season is sponsored by Mitre 10 (building equipment), Domain (cash flow & house marketing), McCafé (snacks & beverages), Volkswagen (transport & cash flow), Lite N‘ Easy (groceries & meals) & BlueScope Steel (housing foundation, weekly viewer's choice voting & promotion).

Tess Cattana & Luke Struber won the season with $630,000 + $100,000 prize money. Each team of contestants won $384,000 or more. The auction profits had a combined result of $2,292,000.

House	Auction spot	Couple	Reserve	Auction result	Profit	Total winnings	Placing spot
1	1	Mitch & Mark	$2.990m	$3.374m	$384,000	$384,000	5th
2	2	Tess & Luke	$2.990m	$3.620m	$630,000	$730,000	1st
3	4	Andy & Deb	$2.990m	$3.420m	$430,000	$430,000	3rd
4	3	Elise & Matt	$2.990m	$3.450m	$460,000	$460,000	2nd
5	5	Jesse & Mel	$2.990m	$3.378m	$388,000	$388,000	4th

=== Season 16 ===
In July 2019, it was reported by the Herald Sun that The Block and Channel 9 had acquired a vacant block of land in the exclusive bayside suburb of Brighton on 360 New Street, Brighton. Newly renovated houses are expected to be built on the land in 2020 for the 16th season of the Block.

Applications for the sixteenth season of the series opened in August 2019 until 15 September 2019, looking for couples aged between 18 and 65 years old being sought by casting agents. Filming for the season is slated to begin in late January 2020.

In October 2019, the sixteenth season and location of The Block were officially confirmed at Nine's upfronts.

In March 2020, the season was suspended due to the coronavirus pandemic and the potential risk it could cause to the crew, workers and contestants. After more than a month of suspension, the season resumed production on 4 May 2020 With extra safety precautions set in place.

In July 2020, Nine Network announced the teams for this season. The sixteenth season of The Block will premiere on Sunday, 23 August at 7pm.

This season is sponsored by Mitre 10 (building equipment), Domain (cash flow & house marketing), McCafé (snacks & beverages), Ford (transport & cash flow), Lite N‘ Easy (meals), Aldi (groceries) & BlueScope Steel (housing foundation, weekly viewer's choice voting & promotion).

Jimmy & Tam Wilkins won the season with $966,000 + $100,000 prize money, which makes them the first team to win over $1 million. Each team of contestants won $460,000 or more. The auction profits had a combined result of $3,232,002.

House	Auction spot	Couple	Reserve	Auction result	Profit	Total winnings	Placing spot
1	5	Harry & Tash	$3.350m	$4m	$650,000	$650,000	3rd
2	3	Sarah & George	$3.350m	$4,000,002	$650,002	$650,002	2nd
3	4	Daniel & Jade	$3.340m	$3.8m	$460,000	$460,000	5th
4	1	Luke & Jasmine	$3.350m	$3.856m	$506,000	$506,000	4th
5	2	Jimmy & Tam	$3.290m	$4.256m	$966,000	$1.066m	1st

=== Season 17 ===
Applications for the seventeenth season of the series opened in August 2020 until 27 September 2020, looking for couples aged between 18 and 65 years old being sought by casting agents. Filming is expected to be a 10–12 week shoot period from late February 2021 In September 2020, the seventeenth season of The Block was officially confirmed at Nine's 2021 upfronts. In October 2020, it was reported that 5 properties on Bronte Court in Hampton, Victoria, were in the process of being purchased by Nine. In December 2020, it was confirmed that Bronte Court will be the next location for renovation, Nine Network acquired five houses in the area for $11.5 million combined.

In July 2021, it was officially confirmed the season will be Fans vs Faves, the second iteration of the format since season 8.^{[d]} Returning to the series are Mitch and Mark (season 15) / Ronnie and Georgia (season 13). Joining The Block will be Tanya and Vito, Josh and Luke & Kirsty and Jesse.

The seventeenth season of The Block premiered on Sunday, 8 August at 7pm.

Mitch Edwards & Mark McKie won the season with $644,444.44 + $100,000 prize money, Each team of contestants won $296,000 or more. The auction profits had a combined result of $2,171,968.12.

House	Auction spot	Couple	Reserve	Auction result	Profit	Total winnings	Placing spot
1	1	Ronnie & Georgia	$3.400m	$3.696m	$296,000	$296,000	5th
2	2	Mitch & Mark	$3.400m	$4,044,444.44	$644,444.44	$744,444.44	1st
3	3	Tanya & Vito	$3.400m	$3,800,000.01	$400,000.01	$400,000.01	3rd
4	4	Josh & Luke	$3.400m	$3.93m	$530,000	$530,000	2nd
5	5	Kirsty & Jesse	$4.100m	$4,401,523.67	$301,523.67	$301,523.67	4th

=== Season 18 ===
Applications for the eighteenth season of the series opened in September 2021 until 18 October 2021, looking for couples aged between 18 and 65 years old being sought by casting agents. Filming is expected to be a 10–12 week shoot period from late February 2022. In September 2021, the eighteenth season of The Block was officially confirmed at Nine's 2022 upfronts, and for the first time the series will be heading to a regional location, the Macedon Ranges, where the contestants will be transforming country houses.

In early April 2022, the day filming was scheduled to commence it was confirmed by sources that a contestant had tested positive to COVID-19. Filming was delayed by a week with filming commencing mid-April.

Omar & Oz won the season with $1,586,666.66 + $100,000 prize money, leaving both of them with $843,333 each and being the second biggest profit to date for one team. Despite the huge win the other teams didn't fare so well. Ryan & Rachel passed in at auction but immediately sold to the highest bidder for $169,000.50 and Tom & Sarah-Jane sold for $20,000.99 the lowest profit since season 9. Ankur & Sharon and Dylan & Jenny's homes were both passed in with no result on auction day. On 11 November 2022, it was confirmed Ankur & Sharon's house had sold for $4.25 million giving them a profit of $170,000. On 13 February 2023, Dylan and Jenny's house was sold for an undisclosed amount more than 3 months after auction. In May 2023, it was revealed their house had sold for $3.9 million, $180,000 under reserve, meaning they did not make any profit.

House	Auction spot	Couple	Reserve	Auction result	Amount sold for after Auction	Profit	Total winnings	Placing spot
1	2	Tom & Sarah-Jane	$4.08m	$4,100,000.99	N/A	$20,000.99	$20,000.99	4th
2	3	Ryan & Rachel	$4.08m	Passed in	$4,249,000.50	$169,000.50	$169,000.50	3rd
3	4	Ankur & Sharon	$4.08m	Passed in	$4.25m	$170,000	$170,000	2nd
4	5	Dylan & Jenny	$4.08m	Passed in	$3.9m	$0	$0	5th
5	1	Omar & Oz	$4.08m	$5,666,666.66	N/A	$1,586,666.66	$1,686,666.66	1st

=== Season 19 ===
Applications for the nineteenth season of the series opened in September 2022. In September 2022, it was reported Nine had bought five classic brick homes in Charming street, Hampton East, Victoria, for an estimated amount of $14.3 million. Construction began on the houses in mid-March 2023, and a series promo with a 1950s theme was filmed on the street with the unconfirmed contestants in the same month. Filming is expected to be a 10- to 12-week shoot period from early March 2023. Filming of the series was completed in mid June 2023. In July 2023, it was announced judge Neale Whitaker will be stepping back on judging duties and Marty Fox will step in as a judge. On 20 July 2023, the nineteenth season of The Block was confirmed to premiere on Sunday, 6 August at 7pm along with the reveal of the contestants.

Gian & Steph won the season with $1,650,000 + $100,000 prize money, leaving both of them with $1,750,000 and being the biggest profit to date for one team. The second auction held by Eliza & Liberty gave them a profit of $1,050,000 which will be split between each other. Despite these two huge wins the other teams didn't fare so well. Kristy & Brett (third auction) only made a profit of $65,000 whilst Kyle & Leslie (fourth auction) made a profit of $130,000, a fraction of the winners' profit. The fifth and last auction by Leah & Ash ended up passing in with no result on auction day. On 28 February 2024, it was confirmed Leah & Ash's house had sold for $3.125 million, giving them a profit of $155,000.

House	Auction spot	Couple	Reserve	Auction result	Amount sold for after Auction	Profit	Total winnings	Placing spot
1	4	Kyle & Leslie	$2.97m	$3.1m	N/A	$130,000	$130,000	4th
2	5	Leah & Ash	$2.97m	Passed in	$3.125m	$155,000	$155,000	3rd
3	3	Kristy & Brett	$2.97m	$3.035m	N/A	$65,000	$65,000	5th
4	1	Gian & Steph	$3.35m	$5m	N/A	$1.65m	$1.75m	1st
5	2	Eliza & Liberty	$3.25m	$4.3m	N/A	$1.05m	$1.05m	2nd

=== Season 20 ===
Applications for the twentieth season of the series opened in September 2023 until 15 October 2023, looking for couples aged between 18 and 65 years old being sought by casting agents. Filming is expected to be a 12 week shoot period from late February 2024. In September 2023, the twentieth season of The Block was officially confirmed at Nine's 2024 upfronts. The location for this season was set to be in Daylesford, Victoria, however due to permit issues and complaints by local residents, Nine decided not to build in the area and started searching for a new location. In October 2023, it was reported Nine had purchased the Island Cove Villas, set over 2.5 acres, for $9.5 Million on Phillip Island. On 3 November 2023, the location was officially confirmed by Nine. In December 2023, a tall privacy wall was built around the perimeter of the location to prevent locals from entering the premises. In May 2024, foreman Keith Schleiger announced he would be drawing back his appearance to guest this season due to family commitments. On 26 June 2024, the first teaser was shown which also revealed the contestants. It was also revealed that longtime judge Neale Whitaker would not be returning to the show as a regular judge, after previously stepping back on judging duties in 2023. Marty Fox will return as his replacement, and Whitaker will make a guest appearance.

During the fifth week of filming, Jesse & Paige decided to leave the competition based on advice from the series psychologist, and a new team will take their place with already 4 rooms complete. In episode 18, Sydney sisters Maddy & Charlotte replaced Jesse & Paige in house 1.

For the first time in two seasons, all houses sold at auction. Maddy & Charlotte Harry won the season with $1,550,000 + $100,000 prize money, leaving them both with $825,000 each and making them the youngest winning team in the history of The Block. Each team of contestants won $650,000 or more. The auction profits had a combined result of $5,330,000, which is currently the highest combined result over all seasons.

All five houses were bought by the same person, billionaire Adrian Portelli who had previously bought houses in season 18 & 19.

House	Auction spot	Couple	Reserve	Auction result	Profit	Total winnings	Placing spot
1	5	Maddy & Charlotte	$1.95m	$3.5m	$1.55m	$1.65m	1st
2	1	Courtney & Grant	$1.95m	$3.3m	$1.35m	$1.35m	2nd
3	4	Ricky & Haydn	$1.95m	$2.7m	$750,000	$750,000	4th
4	2	Kylie & Brad	$1.95m	$2.6m	$650,000	$650,000	5th
5	3	Kristian & Mimi	$1.9m	$2.93m	$1.03m	$1.03m	3rd

=== Season 21 ===
The location for the 2024 season (season 20) was set to be in Daylesford, Victoria, however due to permit issues and complaints by local residents, Nine decided not to build in the area and went with new location of Phillip Island. In July 2024, it was announced that the 2025 season would return to Daylesford after permits were approved by the council, a 2400 square-metre block on 1 Raglan Street was sold to Nine earlier in 2024 for an undisclosed price. In October 2024, the season was officially confirmed at Nine's 2025 upfronts.

The auctions received very mixed results and became one of the worst auctions seen in years. The first auction led by Britt & Taz ended with them receiving $420k, however it was the only auction to make a profit over $120k, the second auction by Robby & Mat landed them with $109,999.10 which they have to split. From the third auction onwards, each team took a vendors bid, unfortunately third auction by Emma & Ben passed in, fourth by Sonny & Alicia just went over their vendor bid giving them $120k and the fifth by Han & Can was also passed in, leading Britt & Taz to win The Block and receive the prize of $100k, making their final profits $520k. The combined result was $649,999.10, the lowest combined result since Season nine.

As of April 2026, Han & Can and Emma & Ben’s homes were still for sale, with the formers house now $90k under the reserve, meaning if sold they will not receive any money. In June 2026, both houses were still for sale and the sale prices were cut back to $2.6 million, $300k off their reserves, now meaning both teams won’t receive any money if sold. On 7 August 2026, it was reported that both houses were now "under offer" however a sale price has yet to be provided for both houses. On 13 August, it was revealed avid The Block auction buyer Danny Wallis, had bought both houses for $2.15 million each, $840k under both reserves which leaves Han & Can and Emma & Ben with no winnings.

House	Auction spot	Couple	Reserve	Auction result	Amount sold for after Auction	Profit	Total winnings	Placing spot
1	3	Emma & Ben	$2.99m	Passed in	$2.15m	$0	$0	4
2	5	Han & Can	$2.99m	Passed in	$2.15m	$0	$0	4
3	1	Britt & Taz	$2.99m	$3.41m	—N/a	$420,000	$520,000	1
4	4	Sonny & Alicia	$2.94m	$3.06m	—N/a	$120,000	$120,000	2
5	2	Robby & Mat	$2.99m	$3,099,999.10	—N/a	$109,999.10	$109,999.10	3

=== Season 22 ===
In August 2025, it was reported that Nine had bought a 1.35ha site which contains six blocks of land at 109 Old Mornington Rd, Mount Eliza, Victoria, for $11 million. Auditions for the 22nd season opened in September 2025 with shooting expected to begin in February 2026 for 12 weeks. In October 2025, the 22nd season and location was officially confirmed at Nine’s 2026 upfronts. Filming of the series began in mid-March 2026. In a first for the series, the contestants will be living together in a share house off-site in Mt Eliza. In July 2026, the contestants were revealed along with the airdate of 2 August 2026.

For the first time due to a victorian law change, the reserve prices for each house will be revealed seven days before auction, which could possibly cause impact on their selling prices.

For the first time since 2024, all houses sold at auction. Courtney & Sev won the season with $1,270,000 + $100,000 prize money & $500k prize pool, leaving them both with $685,000 each. Each team of contestants won $367,000 or more. The auction profits had a combined result of $3,547,000.

House	Auction spot	Couple	Reserve	Auction result	Profit	Total winnings	Placing spot
1	1	Adam & Joelene	$3.45m	$3.905m	$455,000	$455,000	4
2	4	Chantel & Wyatt	$3.45m	$3.817m	$367,000	$367,000	5
3	3	Lisa & Rosco	$3.45m	$4m	$550,000	$550,000	3
4	2	Courtney & Sev	$3.45m	$4.72m	$1.27m	$1.37m & $500k prize pool	1
5	5	Rick & Tayla	$3.45m	$4.355m	$905,000	$905,000	2

=== Season 23 ===
Auditions for the 23rd season opened in September 2026 with shooting expected to begin in February 2027 for 12 weeks and is rumoured to be filmed in Sunbury, Victoria but is not yet confirmed. In the same month during Nine’s upfronts, the series and the location of Jacksons Hill in Sunbury, Victoria, were confirmed along with the announcement that season 23 will have a companion series titled "The Block: The House Next Door" which will air weekly on Stan that will see the return of five all-star teams renovating a sixth property near the same location at the same time as the main seasons contestants. In November 2026, it was reported the location for the season, which sits 3 buildings including the Sunbury Asylum, was bought for only $1.1 million in September 2026.

== Viewership ==
The two first seasons were successful with audience viewership, with the first season averaging 2.2 million viewers. The season one finale was watched by 3.115 million viewers, and Season 2 was watched by 2.273 million viewers.

The third season debuted with 1,134,000, a daily rank of 9. It lost to all its main time slot competition, which consisted of Glee on Network Ten and Border Security on the Seven Network. However, it remained successful with key demographics and enjoyed steady ratings throughout the season. Season 3 concluded with 1.712 million viewers, and it was the top program of the night in total people and all key demographics. It was also the second-most-watched program of the week.

Season	Episodes	Premiere			Finale					Source
Season	Episodes	Premiere date	Premiere ratings	Rank	Finale date	Finale ratings (Grand final)	Rank	Finale ratings (Winner announced)	Rank	Source
One	13	1 June 2003	—N/a		17 August 2003	3.115	#1	—N/a		
Two	26	18 April 2004	—N/a		25 July 2004	2.273	#1	—N/a		
Three	9	22 September 2010	1.139	#9	24 November 2010	1.305	#3	1.716	#1	
Four	51	20 June 2011	1.342	#4	21 August 2011	2.283	#4	3.289	#1	
Five	69	16 April 2012	1.404	#2	1 July 2012	2.145	#3	2.715	#1	
Six	39	4 February 2013	0.959	#9	20 March 2013	1.646	#3	2.119	#1	
Seven	68	12 May 2013	1.312	#4	28 July 2013	2.132	#3	2.808	#1	
Eight	61	27 January 2014	1.143	#7	9 April 2014	1.884	#3	2.181	#1	
Nine	65	27 July 2014	1.374	#1	12 October 2014	1.796	#4	2.764	#1	
Ten	58	27 January 2015	0.860	#8	29 April 2015	1.645	#3	2.027	#1	
Eleven	47	6 September 2015	1.074	#4	25 November 2015	1.579	#2	1.812	#1	
Twelve	46	21 August 2016	1.074	#3	13 November 2016	1.712	#2	2.104	#1	
Thirteen	52	30 July 2017	1.117	#4	29 October 2017	1.976	#2	2.255	#1	
Fourteen	47	5 August 2018	1.163	#1	28 October 2018	1.674	#2	1.865	#1	
Fifteen	57	4 August 2019	0.991	#3	10 November 2019	1.541	#2	1.924	#1	
Sixteen	50	23 August 2020	0.947	#3	22 November 2020	1.428	#2	1.792	#1	
Seventeen	50	8 August 2021	0.747	#7	7 November 2021	1.555	#2	1.835	#1	
Eighteen	51	7 August 2022	0.867	#2	6 November 2022	1.384	#2	1.692	#1	
Nineteen	51	6 August 2023	0.722	#3	5 November 2023	1.274	#2	1.592	#1	
Twentieth^{[e]}	52	12 August 2024	1.108	#1	10 November 2024	2.110	#2	2.190	#1	
Twenty-one^{[e]}	50	27 July 2025	1.303	#1	26 October 2025	2.393	#1	—N/a		
Twenty-two^{[e]}	50	2 August 2026	1.110	#3	1 November 2026	1.928	#1	—N/a		

== Awards and nominations ==
Year	Award	Category	Nominee	Result
2004	Logie Awards	Most Popular Reality Program	The Block	Nominated
2005	Logie Awards	Most Popular Reality Program	The Block 2	Nominated
2012	Logie Awards	Most Popular Reality Program	The Block 2011	Won
2013	Logie Awards	Most Popular Reality Program	The Block 2012	Won
2014	Logie Awards	Most Popular Reality Program	The Block: All Stars	Nominated
2014	Logie Awards	Most Popular Reality Program	The Block: Sky High	Nominated
2014	Logie Awards	Gold Logie for Most Popular Personality on Australian TV	Scott Cam	Won
2014	Logie Awards	Most Popular Presenter	Scott Cam	Won
2015	Logie Awards	Gold Logie for Most Popular Personality on Australian TV	Scott Cam	Nominated
2015	Logie Awards	Most Popular Reality Program	The Block: Glasshouse	Won
2016	Logie Awards	Gold Logie for Best Personality on Australian TV	Scott Cam	Nominated
2016	Logie Awards	Best Reality Program	The Block: Blocktagon	Won
2016	Logie Awards	Best New Talent	Dan Reilly	Nominated
2017	Logie Awards	Best Reality Program	The Block 2016	Won
2018	Logie Awards	Best Reality Program	The Block 2017	Won
2019	Logie Awards	Most Popular Reality Program	The Block 2018	Nominated
2022	Logie Awards	Most Popular Reality Program	The Block: Fans vs Faves 2021	Nominated
2023	Logie Awards	Bert Newton Award for Most Popular Presenter	Scott Cam	Nominated
2023	Logie Awards	Most Popular Reality Program	The Block 2022	Nominated
2023	Logie Awards	Most Outstanding Reality Program	The Block 2022	Nominated
2024	Logie Awards	Best Competition Reality Program	The Block 2023	Nominated
2025	Logie Awards	Best Competition Reality Program	The Block 2024	Nominated
2026	Logie Awards	Best Competition Reality Program	The Block 2025	Nominated

== Reno Rumble ==
Reno Rumble was a program that pit teams from The Block against teams from the Seven Network's reality series House Rules. The program aired on the Nine Network and was produced by the same production company as The Block.

The series was renewed for a second season but did not involve former contestants from The Block or House Rules and was only produced by the Nine Network.

== Adaptations ==
Country	Title	Broadcaster	Presenter(s)	Original run
Israel	The Block	Channel 10	Haim Etgar	30 May 2009 – 10 September 2009
Netherlands	Het Blok	NET 5	Erik van der Hoff	2004–2008, 2010–2011
New Zealand	The Block NZ	Three	Mark Richardson & Shelley Ferguson	4 July 2012 – 9 October 2022
United Kingdom	The Block	ITV	Lisa Rogers	3 August – 21 September 2004
Finland	Unelmakämppä	Nelonen	Sanna Saarijärvi	26 September 2004 – 14 May 2006
Belgium	The Block	VT4	Hans Otten & Hanne Troonbeeckx	2004 – 2009
Germany	Wettkampf in 4 Wänden – Die ultimative Bau-Challenge	RTL	TBD	2024

== Death ==
One of the workers, John Jeremy Bradley, died earlier in October 2022. He suffered a heart attack at age 42.

== Notes ==
- ^{a} The first and second seasons have retroactively been titled as The Block 2003, as shown in The Block: All Stars, and The Block 2004, respectively.
- ^{c} Despite constant references to "The Blocktagon" being made by hosts, contestants and other media, the eleventh season was the first to not have the title appear on-screen; this became standard for most following seasons.
- ^{d} Although this is the second time the title Fans vs Faves will be used, this is actually the third season to have returning contestants versus new contestants (seasons 8 and 10 respectively).
- ^{e} Ratings data is from OzTAM and represents the national average viewership.

== See also ==
- List of Australian television series
- List of programs broadcast by Nine Network
- House Rules (Australian TV series)
- The Renovators
