= The Block season 21 =

Season of television series

The Block
- Season 21
- No. of episodes: 50

Release
- Original network: Nine Network
- Original release: 27 July – 26 October 2025

Season chronology
- ← Previous; Season 20 Next → Season 22

The twenty-first season of Australian reality television series The Block premiered on 27 July 2025 on the Nine Network. Hosts Scott Cam and Shelley Craft, Dan Reilly returns as site foreman and judges Shaynna Blaze, Darren Palmer and Marty Fox all returning from the previous season.

== Production ==
In July 2024, it was announced that the 2025 season would return to Daylesford after permits were approved by the council, a 2400 square-metre block on 1 Raglan Street was sold to Nine earlier in 2024 for an undisclosed price. Applications for the twenty-first season of the series opened in September 2024 until 4 November 2024, looking for couples aged between 18 and 65 years old. If a person wants to join the cast for the 2025 season, they must be available for a 12-week shoot from February 2025, and they will not be able to work their regular jobs throughout the shoot period. Having previous reno (house renovation) experience will give an applicant an advantage, but even total beginners are welcome to apply. In October 2024, the season was officially confirmed at Nine's 2025 upfronts. Series producer Julian Cress speculated (correctly) there will be no open house to the public due to the logistics of the area including lack of parking. The Block auctions took place on Saturday, 25 October 2025 and aired the next day on Sunday, 26 October 2025.

=== Format changes ===
This season, houses will be built from scratch in the exact same layout and size. Also this season all-nighters are outlawed, and the building site will be locked every night, impacting the teams time-management skills. During the first episode, for the first time ever the weekly schedule and budget of each room and complete budget of $250K were provided to the teams, also a "powerpass" of $40,000 from Bunnings.

== Contestants ==
House	Couple	Age	Location	Relationship	Occupations
1	Emma (Em) & Ben Cox	33 & 32	Melbourne, VIC	Married / Parents-to-be	Dance teacher & engineer
2	Hannah (Han) Thetford & Candice (Can) Wood	29 & 31	Perth, WA	Couple	Geologist & social media and marketing analyst
3	Britt & Taz Etto	Both 30	Newman, WA	Married	Both police officers
4	Sonny & Alicia Aplin	44 & 42	Gold Coast, QLD	Married	Plumber & Dental Practice Manager
5	Robby Lippett & Mat Johnson	37 & 41	Adelaide, SA	Best mates	Barber & hairdresser

== Score history ==
Teams' progress summarised through the competition
	Teams				
	Emma & Ben	Han & Can	Britt & Taz	Sonny & Alicia	Robby & Mat
Rooms	Scores				
Bathroom	24	19 1/2	24	25 1/2	26 1/2
Kids Rooms	25 1/2	24	28	24 1/2	20 1/2
Main Ensuite	28	29	21 1/2	26 1/2	27 1/4
Main Bedroom & WIR	28 1/2	20	29	21 1/2	25
Living & Dining	22	27 1/2	28 1/2	21	29 1/2
Rumpus Room	28	29 3/4	20 1/2	27 1/2	18
Kitchen	26	26 1/2	28 1/2	27	28 1/2
Guest Suite	29 1/2	23 1/2	19	28	20 1/2
Laundry WC, Mudroom & Garage	22	27 1/2	28	26 1/2	25 1/2
Alfresco Terrace & Stratco Shed	26	21	27	29	30
Backyard & Pool	38 1/2	31 1/2	37 3/4	36 3/4	38
Front Facade	37	35 1/2	31	38	34 1/2

=== Weekly Room Expenditures ===
Week	Room(s)	Budget ($250k)	Costs				
Week	Room(s)	Budget ($250k)	Emma & Ben	Han & Can	Britt & Taz	Sonny & Alicia	Robby & Mat
1	Bathroom	$20,000	$22,552	$19,711	$21,350	$14,739	$25,394
2	Kids Rooms	$15,000	$17,554	$15,477	$16,970	$14,970	$24,432
3	Main Ensuite	$20,000	$18,360	$23,853.33	$20,999.99	$18,146	$21,643.33
4	Main Bedroom & WIR	$15,000	$24,575	$18,643	$15,074	$19,172	$17,933
5	Living & Dining	$20,000	$22,269	$32,412	$33,585	$19,999	$21,225
6	Rumpus Room	$10,000	$8,700	$11,570	$10,872	$8,846	$9,986
7	Kitchen	$10,000	$12,223	$20,845	$17,968	$12,103	$19,413
8	Guest Suite	$30,000	$35,399	$38,787	$33,804	$31,077	$33,374
9	Laundry, WC, Mudroom & Garage	$20,000	$35,167	$40,455	$37,930	$38,215	$34,232
10	Alfresco Terrace & Stratco Shed	$20,000	—N/a				
11	Backyard & Pool	$50,000	$19,575	$9,753	$40,348	$18,551	$57,151
12	Front Facade	$20,000	$149,903	$51,132	$116,920	$131,551	$66,356
Final Total Costs			$366,277	$282,638.33	$365,820.99	$327,369	$331,139.33

=== Weekly Room & Best Budget Prize ===
Week	Room	Winning team	Prize
1	Bathroom	Robby & Mat	$10k and a night away courtesy of MG
2	Kids Rooms	Britt & Taz	$10k, a night away courtesy of MG and $175k worth of kitchen appliances courtesy of E&S
3	Main Ensuite	Han & Can	$10k and a night away courtesy of MG
4	Main Bedroom & WIR	Britt & Taz	$10k for scoring a 10, $10k and a night away courtesy of MG
5	Living & Dining	Robby & Mat	$10k and a night away courtesy of MG
6	Rumpus Room	Han & Can	$10k for scoring a 10, $10k and a night away courtesy of MG
7	Kitchen	Britt & Taz	$10k each courtesy of MG
7	Kitchen	Robby & Mat	$10k each courtesy of MG
8	Guest Suite	Emma & Ben	$20k for scoring two 10s, $10k and a night away courtesy of MG
9	Laundry, WC, Mudroom & Garage	Britt & Taz	$10k for scoring a 10, $10k and a night away courtesy of MG
10	Alfresco Terrace & Stratco Shed	Robby & Mat	$30k for scoring three 10's, $10k and a night away courtesy of MG
11	Backyard & Pool	Emma & Ben	$10k and a night away courtesy of MG
12	Front Facade	Sonny & Alicia	$50K off their reserve price, $10k for scoring a 10, an MG Ute for the driveway and a hybrid for themselves

After the weekly winning team is announced, the team that keeps the best track of their budget at the end of each week will win 10k to their budget.

Week	Best Budget Team	Prize
1	Sonny & Alicia	$30k
2	Sonny & Alicia	$30k
3	Sonny & Alicia	$30k
4	Britt & Taz	$10k
5	Sonny & Alicia	$10k
6	Emma & Ben	$10k
7	Sonny & Alicia	$20k
8	Sonny & Alicia	$20k
9	Nobody won	$0
10	Han & Can	$20K
11	Han & Can	$10K
12	None	—N/a

== Results ==
=== Judges' Scores ===
Colour key:
Highest Score
Lowest Score

Summary of Judges' Scores
Week	Area(s)	Scores	Teams				
Week	Area(s)	Scores	Emma & Ben	Han & Can	Britt & Taz	Sonny & Alicia	Robby & Mat
1	Bathroom	Darren	8 1/2	6 1/2	8	9	9
1	Bathroom	Marty	7 1/2	6 1/2	8	8 1/2	9
1	Bathroom	Shaynna	8	6 1/2	8	8	8 1/2
1	Bathroom	Total	24	19 1/2	24	25 1/2	26 1/2
2	Kids Rooms	Darren	9	9	9 1/2	9	7 1/2
2	Kids Rooms	Marty	8	7 1/2	9	7 1/2	6 1/2
2	Kids Rooms	Shaynna	8 1/2	7 1/2	9 1/2	8	6 1/2
2	Kids Rooms	Total	25 1/2	24	28	24 1/2	20 1/2
3	Main Ensuite	Darren	9 1/2	9 1/2	7 1/2	9	9 1/2
3	Main Ensuite	Marty	9	9 1/2	6 1/2	9	9 3/4
3	Main Ensuite	Shaynna	9 1/2	9+1	7 1/2	8 1/2	8
3	Main Ensuite	Total	28	29	21 1/2	26 1/2	27 1/4
4	Main Bedroom & WIR	Darren	9 1/2	6 1/2	10	7	9
4	Main Bedroom & WIR	Marty	9 1/2	6 1/2	9 1/2	7 1/2	8
4	Main Bedroom & WIR	Shaynna	9 1/2	7	9 1/2	7	8
4	Main Bedroom & WIR	Total	28 1/2	20	29	21 1/2	25
5	Living & Dining	Darren	8	9 1/2	9 1/2	8	9 1/2
5	Living & Dining	Marty	6 1/2	9	9 1/2	6 1/2	9 1/2
5	Living & Dining	Shaynna	7 1/2	9	9 1/2	6 1/2	9 1/2 +1
5	Living & Dining	Total	22	27 1/2	28 1/2	21	29 1/2
6	Rumpus Room	Darren	9 1/2	10	7	9 1/2	6
6	Rumpus Room	Marty	9 1/2	9 3/4	6 1/2	9	6
6	Rumpus Room	Shaynna	9	9 1/2	7	9	6
6	Rumpus Room	Total	28	29 1/4	20 1/2	27 1/2	18
7	Kitchen	Darren	9	9 1/2	9 1/2	9 1/2	9 1/2
7	Kitchen	Marty	8 1/2	9	9 1/2	8 1/2	9 1/2
7	Kitchen	Shaynna	8 1/2	8	9 1/2	9	9 1/2
7	Kitchen	Total	26	26 1/2	28 1/2	27	28 1/2
8	Guest Suite	Darren	10	8	6 1/2	9 1/2	7
8	Guest Suite	Marty	9 1/2	8	6 1/2	9	7
8	Guest Suite	Shaynna	10	7 1/2	6	9 1/2	6 1/2
8	Guest Suite	Total	29 1/2	23 1/2	19	28	20 1/2
9	Laundry WC, Mudroom & Garage	Darren	7 1/2	9	9 1/2	9	8 1/2
9	Laundry WC, Mudroom & Garage	Marty	7 1/2	9	8 1/2	8 1/2	8 1/2
9	Laundry WC, Mudroom & Garage	Shaynna	7	9 1/2	10	9	8 1/2
9	Laundry WC, Mudroom & Garage	Total	22	27 1/2	28	26 1/2	25 1/2
10	Alfresco Terrace & Stratco Shed	Darren	9 1/2	7	9	10	10
10	Alfresco Terrace & Stratco Shed	Marty	8 1/2	7	9	9 1/2	10
10	Alfresco Terrace & Stratco Shed	Shaynna	8	7	9	9 1/2	10
10	Alfresco Terrace & Stratco Shed	Total	26	21	27	29	30
11	Backyard & Pool	Dave	9 1/2	8	9 1/2	9	9 1/2
11	Backyard & Pool	Darren	9 1/2	8	9 1/2	9 1/2	9 1/2
11	Backyard & Pool	Marty	9	7 1/2	9	9 1/4	9 1/2
11	Backyard & Pool	Shaynna	9 1/2+1	8	9¾	9	9 1/2
11	Backyard & Pool	Total	38 1/2	31 1/2	37¾	36¾	38
12	Front Facade	Dave	9	9	7 1/2	9	8
12	Front Facade	Darren	9 1/2	9 1/2	9	9 1/2	9
12	Front Facade	Marty	9	8 1/2	7	10	8 1/2
12	Front Facade	Shaynna	9 1/2	8 1/2	7 1/2	9 1/2	9
12	Front Facade	Total	37	35 1/2	31	38	34 1/2

=== Challenge scores ===
Summary of challenge scores
Week	Challenge		Reward	Teams				
Week	Challenge	Description	Reward	Emma & Ben	Han & Can	Britt & Taz	Sonny & Alicia	Robby & Mat
1	House Decider Challenge	Create a float to take part in Daylesford's ChillOut Festival	Decides their house	House 1	House 2	House 3	House 4	House 5
2	Upholster Challenge	Blockheads have to design and upholster under the guidance of Andy	$10k courtesy of Snooze, David Bromley Sesame Street original paintings worth $30k and Dayle S. Ford Gnome, the bonus point		1st			
3	Spa Challenge (completed in week 6)	Over a few weeks, the Blockheads have to renovate the Daylesford's natural spring spa rooms	Titanium Caravan worth $260k				1st	
4	Clay Shooting Challenge	Blockheads have to shoot things made of clay	$5k & $20k zip screen backyard blinds	1st				
5	Comedy Roast	Blockheads have to roast each other	$5k, Trendz outdoor fireplace($52k) and the gnome.					1st
5	Pickleball Challenge	Blockheads have to play each other in a pickleball game	$10k and a court worth $50k for their backyard.					1st
5	Style Lounge Challenge	One Blockhead from each team has to style a lounge at Freedom	$5k				1st	
6	Grafico Wallpaper	Blockheads have to create a design for a wallpaper from Grafico	$5k & a $15k wallpaper feature					1st
7	Rex Cinema Challenge	In two teams, they must renovate either the candy bar or the cinema/foyer at Daylesford's old Rex Cinema	$10k and a $10k voucher from Stony Creek Gallery split between teams	Team Candybar	Team Cinema	Team Candybar	Team Cinema	Team Cinema
8	Lake race Challenge	Race across Lake Daylesford in floaters and be the first across the finish line	$5k indoor three-person sauna	1st				
8	Domain Buyers Jury Challenge	100 potential buyers vote on which house is the best	$50k + secret gnome	24% of the votes	13% of the votes	21% of the votes	19% of the votes	23% of the votes
9	Tradie Games Challenge	Each team competes in a number of games	$10k + $10k of mature trees				1st	
10	Arnott's Baking Challenge	Each team makes a baked good, judged by the local country women's association	$10k			1st		

== Auction ==
Auction results
Rank	Couple	Reserve	Auction Result	Amount sold for after Auction	Profit made	Total Profit	Auction Order
1	Britt & Taz	$2.99m	$3.41m	—N/a	$420,000	$520,000	1
2	Sonny & Alicia	$2.94m	$3.06m	—N/a	$120,000	$120,000	4
3	Robby & Mat	$2.99m	$3,099,999.10	—N/a	$109,999.10	$109,999.10	2
4	Emma & Ben	$2.99m	Passed in	$2.15m	$0	$0	3
4	Han & Can	$2.99m	Passed in	$2.15m	$0	$0	5

== Ratings ==
The Block 2025 National Reach and Total viewership and nightly position Colour key: – Highest rating during the series – Lowest rating during the series
Week	Episode		Original airdate	Timeslot	National Reach Viewers (millions) (Note: Ratings data is from OzTAM and represents the National Reach and National average viewership)	National Total Viewers (millions)	Nightly rank	Source
1	1	"Welcome to The Block"	27 July 2025	Sunday 7:00 pm	2.700	1.303	1	
1	2	"Bathroom week begins"	28 July 2025	Monday 7:30 pm	1.919	1.100	3	
1	3	"Bathroom week mid-week"	29 July 2025	Tuesday 7:30 pm	1.898	1.120	3	
1	4	"Bathroom week continues"	30 July 2025	Wednesday 7:30 pm	1.836	1.029	3	
2	5	"Bathrooms revealed"	3 August 2025	Sunday 7:00 pm	2.497	1.312	3	
2	6	"Kids Rooms begin"	4 August 2025	Monday 7:30 pm	2.050	1.082	3	
2	7	"Kids Rooms continues"	5 August 2025	Tuesday 7:30 pm	2.025	1.079	3	
2	8	"Upholster challenge"	6 August 2025	Wednesday 7:30 pm	1.926	1.061	3	
3	9	"Kids Bedrooms revealed"	10 August 2025	Sunday 7:00 pm	2.617	1.412	1	
3	10	"Main Ensuites begin"	11 August 2025	Monday 7:30 pm	1.952	1.074	3	
3	11	"Spa Challenge"	12 August 2025	Tuesday 7:30 pm	1.711	0.961	3	
3	12	"Main Ensuites Continues"	13 August 2025	Wednesday 7:30 pm	1.722	1.029	4	
4	13	"Main Ensuites revealed"	17 August 2025	Sunday 7:00 pm	2.622	1.443	1	
4	14	"Main Bedroom & WIR begin"	18 August 2025	Monday 7:30 pm	2.034	1.099	3	
4	15	"Clay Shooting challenge"	19 August 2025	Tuesday 7:30 pm	1.852	1.040	3	
4	16	"Main Bedroom & WIR continues"	20 August 2025	Wednesday 7:30 pm	1.983	1.113	3	
5	17	"Main Bedroom & WIR revealed"	24 August 2025	Sunday 7:00 pm	2.635	1.492	1	
5	18	"Living & Dining Week Begin"	25 August 2025	Monday 7:30 pm	2.180	1.210	3	
5	19	"Pickelball Challenge"	26 August 2025	Tuesday 7:30 pm	2.257	1.179	2	
5	20	"Living & Dining Week Continues"	27 August 2025	Wednesday 7:30 pm	2.018	1.093	3	
6	21	"Living & Dinings revealed"	31 August 2025	Sunday 7:00 pm	2.743	1.569	1	
6	22	"Rumpus Room Begins"	1 September 2025	Monday 7:30 pm	2.232	1.249	3	
6	23	"Spa Challenge Ends"	2 September 2025	Tuesday 7:30 pm	2.059	1.214	3	
6	24	"Rumpus Room Continues"	3 September 2025	Wednesday 7:30 pm	2.060	1.217	2	
7	25	"Rumpus Room revealed"	7 September 2025	Sunday 7:00 pm	2.767	1.621	1	
7	26	"Kitchen Begins"	8 September 2025	Monday 7:30 pm	2.199	1.220	3	
7	27	"Rex Cinema Challenge"	9 September 2025	Tuesday 7:30 pm	1.831	1.196	5	
7	28	"Kitchen Continues"	10 September 2025	Wednesday 7:30 pm	2.054	1.165	3	
8	29	"Kitchen revealed"	14 September 2025	Sunday 7:00 pm	3.255	1.731	1	
8	30	"Guest Suite Begins"	15 September 2025	Monday 7:30 pm	2.065	1.246	3	
8	31	"Guest Suite Continue"	16 September 2025	Tuesday 7:30 pm	1.975	1.242	3	
8	32	"Domain Buyers Jury Challenge"	17 September 2025	Wednesday 7:30 pm	2.214	1.246	2	
9	33	"Guest Suite revealed"	21 September 2025	Sunday 7:00 pm	2.804	1.597	2	
9	34	"Back Of House Begins"	22 September 2025	Monday 7:30 pm	2.146	1.187	3	
9	35	"Back Of House Continue"	23 September 2025	Tuesday 7:30 pm	2.136	1.252	3	
9	36	"Tradie Games Challenge"	24 September 2025	Wednesday 7:30 pm	2.198	1.217	1	
10	37	"Back Of House revealed"	28 September 2025	Sunday 7:00 pm	2.808	1.632	3	
10	38	"Terrace & Shed Begins"	29 September 2025	Monday 7:30 pm	2.101	1.309	3	
10	39	"Terrace & Shed Continue"	30 September 2025	Tuesday 7:30 pm	2.174	1.268	1	
10	40	"Arnott's Baking Challenge"	1 October 2025	Wednesday 7:30 pm	2.093	1.217	3	
11	41	"Terrace & Shed revealed"	6 October 2025	Monday 7:30 pm	2.533	1.518	1	
11	42	"Backyard Begins"	7 October 2025	Tuesday 7:30 pm	2.323	1.307	1	
11	43	"Backyard Continue"	8 October 2025	Wednesday 7:30 pm	2.130	1.251	1	
11	44	"Backyard Continue"	9 October 2025	Thursday 7:30 pm	1.974	1.109	1	
12	45	"Backyard revealed"	12 October 2025	Sunday 7:00 pm	2.971	1.693	3	
12	46	"Front Facade begins"	13 October 2025	Monday 7:30 pm	2.261	1.294	1	
12	47	"Front Facade continues"	14 October 2025	Tuesday 7:30 pm	2.083	1.340	1	
12	48	"Front Facade continues"	15 October 2025	Wednesday 7:30 pm	2.110	1.218	1	
12	49	"Front Facade revealed"	19 October 2025	Sunday 7:00 pm	2.998	1.775	1	
12	50	"Grand Final/ Auctions"	26 October 2025	Sunday 7:00 pm	3.645	2.393	1	
