= The Block season 8 =

The Block
- Season 8
- No. of episodes: 61

Release
- Original network: Nine Network
- Original release: 27 January – 9 April 2014

Season chronology
- ← Previous; Season 7 Next → Season 9

The eighth season of Australian reality television series The Block, titled The Block: Fans v Faves, premiered on Monday, 27 January 2014 at 7:00 pm on the Nine Network. Scott Cam (host) and Shelley Craft (Challenge Master) returned from the previous season, as did the three judges: Neale Whitaker, Shaynna Blaze and Darren Palmer. Production for the series in Melbourne, which was the location for the previous season, in the suburb of Albert Park. Steve & Chantelle were the eventual winners of The Block with a $636,000 profit on a sale price of $2,470,000 plus an additional $100,000 bonus for winning The Block.

== Contestants ==
This season introduces 2 new couples (dubbed "Fans") and 2 returning couples (dubbed "Favourites"/"Faves"). The couples selected were as follows:

Apt	Couple	State	Relationship
Fans
1	Chantelle Ford and Steve O'Donnell	Melbourne, VIC	Partners
2	Kyal and Kara Demmerich	Central Coast, NSW	Married for 6 years
Faves
3	Alisa and Lysandra Fraser (Note: Former contestants on season 7)	Adelaide, SA	Identical twin sisters
4	Brad Cranfield and Dale Vine (Note: Former contestants on season 5)	Newcastle, NSW & Melbourne, VIC	Best Mates

== Score history ==
Teams' progress through the competition
Scores:	Teams			
Scores:	Chantelle & Steve	Kyal & Kara	Alisa & Lysandra	Brad & Dale
Rooms	Scores			
1st Guest Bedroom	21	22½	24½	22½
Downstair Bathroom/Laundry & Terrace	21½	18½	22	28
2nd Guest Bedroom	24½	25½	24½	22
Upstairs Bathroom	21	30	18½	24½
Kitchen	23	27½	28½	24½
Living/Dining Room	28 (+1)	24½	27	24½
Master Bedroom & Ensuite	28	22½	25	28½
Rooftop, Outside Terrace & Re-do	22	28½	25	28
Challenge House - Reveal 1	24	25½	24	25½
Challenge House - Reveal 2	64	69	64	69
Auction Order	4th	2nd	3rd	1st
Auction Result	1st	3rd	2nd	4th

== Results ==
=== Room Reveals ===
Week	Room	Winning Couple	2nd Couple	3rd Couple	Chumps
1	1st Guest Bedroom	Alisa and Lysandra	Kyal and Kara / Brad and Dale	Chantelle and Steve	—N/a
2	Downstairs Bathrooms, Laundry & Terrace	Brad and Dale	Alisa and Lysandra	Chantelle and Steve	Kyal and Kara
3	2nd Guest Bedroom	Kyal and Kara	Chantalle and Steve	Alisa and Lysandra	Brad and Dale
4	Upstairs Bathroom	Kyal and Kara	Brad and Dale	Chantelle and Steve	Alisa and Lysandra
5	Kitchen	Alisa and Lysandra	Kyal and Kara	Brad and Dale	Chantelle and Steve
6	Living Room and Dining Room	Chantelle and Steve	Alisa and Lysandra	Brad and Dale / Kyal and Kara	—N/a
7	Master Bedroom and Ensuite	Brad and Dale	Chantelle and Steve	Alisa and Lysandra	Kyal and Kara
8	Rooftop/Outside Terrace	Kyal and Kara	Brad and Dale	Alisa and Lysandra	Chantelle and Steve

=== Judges' Scores ===
Summary of judges' scores
Week	Area(s)	Scores	Teams			
Week	Area(s)	Scores	Chantelle & Steve	Kyal & Kara	Alisa & Lysandra	Brad & Dale
1	1st Bedroom	Darren	7	8	8½	7½
1	1st Bedroom	Shaynna	7½	7½	8	7½
1	1st Bedroom	Neale	6½	7	8	7½
1	1st Bedroom	Total	21	22½	24½	22½
2	Downstairs Bathrooms, Laundry & Terrace	Darren	7	6½	8	9½
2	Downstairs Bathrooms, Laundry & Terrace	Shaynna	7½	6	7	9
2	Downstairs Bathrooms, Laundry & Terrace	Neale	7	6	7	9½
2	Downstairs Bathrooms, Laundry & Terrace	Total	21½	18½	22	28
3	2nd Bedroom	Darren	8½	9	8½	8
3	2nd Bedroom	Shaynna	8	8	7	7
3	2nd Bedroom	Neale	8	8½	9	7
3	2nd Bedroom	Total	24½	25½	24½	22
4	Upstairs Bathroom	Darren	7	10	6½	8
4	Upstairs Bathroom	Shaynna	7	10	5	8
4	Upstairs Bathroom	Neale	7	10	7	8½
4	Upstairs Bathroom	Total	21	30	18½	24½
5	Kitchen	Darren	8	9	9½	8½
5	Kitchen	Shaynna	7½	9½	9½	8½
5	Kitchen	Neale	7½	9	9½	7
5	Kitchen	Total	23	27½	28½	24½
6	Living/Dining Room	Darren	9	8	9	8
6	Living/Dining Room	Shaynna	9	8	9	8
6	Living/Dining Room	Neale	9	8½	9	8½
6	Living/Dining Room	Total	28 (+1)	24½	27	24½
7	Master Bedroom & Ensuite	Darren	9	8	8½	9½
7	Master Bedroom & Ensuite	Shaynna	10	7	8	9½
7	Master Bedroom & Ensuite	Neale	9	7½	8½	9½
7	Master Bedroom & Ensuite	Total	28	22½	25	28½
8	Rooftop, Outside Terrace & Re-do Room^{1}	Darren	7½	9½	8	9½
8	Rooftop, Outside Terrace & Re-do Room^{1}	Shaynna	7	9½	8½	9½
8	Rooftop, Outside Terrace & Re-do Room^{1}	Neale	7½	9½	8½	9
8	Rooftop, Outside Terrace & Re-do Room^{1}	Total	22	28½	25	28
9	Challenge House - Reveal 1	Darren	8	7½	8	7½
9	Challenge House - Reveal 1	Shaynna	9	9	9	9
9	Challenge House - Reveal 1	Neale	7	9	7	9
9	Challenge House - Reveal 1	Total	24	25½	24	25½
10	Challenge House - Reveal 2^{2}	Darren	N/A	N/A	N/A	N/A
10	Challenge House - Reveal 2^{2}	Shaynna	N/A	N/A	N/A	N/A
10	Challenge House - Reveal 2^{2}	Neale	N/A	N/A	N/A	N/A
10	Challenge House - Reveal 2^{2}	Total	64	69	64	69

- ^1 The prize for this week was $10,000 cash, towards the couple's winnings. They were told to redo the room that the judges disliked the most:-
  - Chantelle and Steve - Guest Bedroom 1
  - Kyal and Kara - Drying Terrace
  - Alisa and Lysandra - Main Bathroom
  - Brad and Dale - Kitchen
- ^2 The prize for reveal 2 was to receive money off their reserves. There were two teams:

• Brad & Dale + Kyal & Kara (House 2)
• Alisa & Lysandra + Chantelle & Steve (House 1)
The teams split the money they won as a team

=== Auction ===
Rank	Couple	Reserve	Auction Result	Profit	Total Winnings	Auction Order
1	Steve & Chantelle	$1.834m	$2.47m	$636,000	$736,000	4th
2	Alisa & Lysandra	$1.759m	$2.375m	$616,000	$616,000	3rd
3	Kyal & Kara	$1.872m	$2.440m	$567,250	$567,250	2nd
4	Brad & Dale	$1.802m	$2.310m	$507,250	$507,250	1st

== Ratings ==
The Block: Fans v Faves metropolitan viewership and nightly position Colour key: – Highest rating episode and week during the series – Lowest rating episode and week during the series
Week	Episode		Original airdate	Viewers (millions)^{[a]}	Nightly rank^{[a]}	Source	Week Avg
1	1	"Elimination 1"	27 January 2014	1.143	#7		1.165
1	2	"Elimination 2"	28 January 2014	1.131	#9		1.165
1	3	"Fans Meet Faves"	30 January 2014	1.220	#1		1.165
2	4	"Apartment Challenge: Fans v faves"	2 February 2014	0.638	#10		0.959
2	5	"Move In, Camp Out"	3 February 2014	1.125	#7		0.959
2	6	"Super Luke"	4 February 2014	1.030	#7		0.959
2	7	"Challenge: Christopher Boots"	5 February 2014	0.975	#4		0.959
2	8	"Scott and Shelley Walk Around The Block"	6 February 2014	1.134	#1		0.959
2	9	"The Block UNLOCKED #1"	6 February 2014	0.854	#8		0.959
3	10	"Guest Bedroom Room Reveal"	9 February 2014	1.274	#5		1.051
3	11	"Triple Room Week"	10 February 2014	1.068	#7		1.051
3	12	"Bathroom Disasters"	11 February 2014	1.100	#3		1.051
3	13	"Square Metre House Challenge"	12 February 2014	0.964	#7		1.051
3	14	"Sleepy Steve and Chantelle"	13 February 2014	1.070	#2		1.051
3	15	"The Block UNLOCKED #2"	13 February 2014	0.830	#9		1.051
4	16	"Guest Bedroom Room Reveal"	16 February 2014	1.361	#4		1.119
4	17	"Darren Palmer Master Class"	17 February 2014	1.198	#3		1.119
4	18	"The Morning After"	18 February 2014	1.149	#2		1.119
4	19	"The Mark Tuckey Challenge"	19 February 2014	1.045	#7		1.119
4	20	"Wall Wars"	20 February 2014	1.102	#1		1.119
4	21	"The Block UNLOCKED #3"	20 February 2014	0.858	#6		1.119
5	22	"Bedroom Two Room Reveal"	23 February 2014	1.327	#4		1.167
5	23	"The Forgotten Pool	24 February 2014	1.079	#7		1.167
5	24	"Pool Reveal"	25 February 2014	1.192	#2		1.167
5	25	"A Block Wedding & The Hotel Art Challenge"	26 February 2014	1.234	#2		1.167
5	26	"Keith In The Middle"	27 February 2014	1.297	#1		1.167
5	27	"The Block UNLOCKED #4"	27 February 2014	0.875	#7		1.167
6	28	"Main Bathroom Room Reveal"	2 March 2014	1.504	#2		1.257
6	29	"Kitchen Week Begins"	3 March 2014	1.197	#3		1.257
6	30	"Budget Blues"	4 March 2014	1.233	#2		1.257
6	31	"Shelley's Wallpaper Challenge"	5 March 2014	1.092	#4		1.257
6	32	"The Heart of the Home"	6 March 2014	0.644	#15		1.257
6	33	"The Block UNLOCKED #5"	8 March 2014	—N/a	—N/a		1.257
7	34	"Kitchens Room Reveal"	9 March 2014	1.568	#1		1.329
7	35	"The Great Floor"	10 March 2014	1.283	#2		1.329
7	36	"The Block Under Attack"	11 March 2014	1.327	#2		1.329
7	37	"Phil and Amity Return"	12 March 2014	1.140	#3		1.329
7	38	"The Block's Best Kept Secret"	13 March 2014	1.328	#1		1.329
7	39	"The Block UNLOCKED #6"	15 March 2014	—N/a	—N/a		1.329
8	40	"Living & Dining Room Reveals"	16 March 2014	1.571	#1		1.131
8	41	"Winners Aren't Always Grinners"	17 March 2014	1.225	#2		1.131
8	42	"Comedy Night"	18 March 2014	1.302	#2		1.131
8	43	"Lighthouse Foundation Challenge"	19 March 2014	1.233	#2		1.131
8	44	"Silly Pranks and Short Tempers"	20 March 2014	1.121	#1		1.131
8	45	"The Block UNLOCKED #7"	22 March 2014	0.334	#12		1.131
9	46	"Master Bed & Ensuite Room Reveal"	23 March 2014	1.758	#1		1.259
9	47	"Time to Finish The Block"	24 March 2014	1.455	#2		1.259
9	48	"The Heat is On"	25 March 2014	1.341	#3		1.259
9	49	"Beach Volleyball Tournament"	26 March 2014	1.293	#2		1.259
9	50	"The Last Day"	27 March 2014	1.434	#1		1.259
9	51	"The Block UNLOCKED #8"	29 March 2014	0.273	#20		1.259
10	52	"Terrace Room Reveal"	30 March 2014	1.732	#1		1.280
10	53	"Terrace Winner Revealed"	31 March 2014	1.554	#2		1.280
10	54	"Bedroom Blitz"	1 April 2014	1.415	#4		1.280
10	55	"The First Points"	2 April 2014	1.326	#2		1.280
10	56	"Two House Challenge Continues"	3 April 2014	1.372	#1		1.280
10	57	"The Block UNLOCKED #9"	5 April 2014	0.283	#20		1.280
11	58	"The Interiors"	6 April 2014	1.829	#1		1.837
11	59	"The Final Judgement"	7 April 2014	1.485	#2		1.837
11	60	"Open For Inspection"	8 April 2014	1.487	#2		1.837
11	61	"Grand Final"	9 April 2014	1.884	#3		1.837
11	61	"Auctions"	9 April 2014	2.156	#2		1.837
11	61	"Winner Announced"	9 April 2014	2.181	#1		1.837

- ^{a} Ratings data is from OzTAM and represents the live and same day average viewership from the 5 largest Australian metropolitan centres (Sydney, Melbourne, Brisbane, Perth and Adelaide).
