= The Block season 9 =

The Block
- Season 9
- No. of episodes: 65

Release
- Original network: Nine Network
- Original release: 27 July – 12 October 2014

Season chronology
- ← Previous; Season 8 Next → Season 10

The ninth season of Australian reality television series The Block, titled The Block: Glasshouse, premiered on Sunday, 27 July 2014 at 6:30pm on the Nine Network. Scott Cam (host) and Shelley Craft (Challenge Master) returned from the previous season, as did the three judges: Neale Whitaker, Shaynna Blaze and Darren Palmer. It is the second season to have five couples appear on the show, instead of four.

The Glasshouse building is at 121-127 High Street Prahran, Melbourne. The building is double the size of the previous season's building, Dux House, and was the biggest block to date. For a first in any block season, not only do the judges vote on the contestants rooms, but the contestants judge each other's rooms. Shannon and Simon Vos were the eventual winners of the show with a $335,000 profit on a sale price of $1.9 million plus an additional $100,000 bonus prize.

== Contestants ==
The Block: Glasshouse is the second season to have five couples instead of the traditional four couples.

Apt	Couple	Age	Location	Relationship	Occupations
1	Michael & Carlene Duffy	Both 31	Gold Coast, QLD	Married with children	Project Manager/Carpenter & Communications Officer
2	Chris & Jenna Susetio	24 & 26	Campbelltown, NSW	Married	Cabinet Maker & Video Editor
3	Karstan & Maxine Smith	26 & 24	Newcastle, NSW	Engaged (Married on the set)	Coal Miner & Event Manager
4	Shannon & Simon Vos	35 & 28	Coffs Harbour, NSW	Brothers	Painter & Plumber
5	Darren & Deanne Jolly	32 & 44	Melbourne, VIC	Married with children	Studying Building & Stay-at-Home Mum

== Score history ==
Teams' progress through the competition
Scores:	Teams				
Scores:	Michael & Carlene	Chris & Jenna	Karstan & Maxine	Shannon & Simon	Darren & Deanne
Rooms	Scores				
1st Guest Bedroom	26	23	17	27	25½
Main Bathroom	24	30	26	23	28
2nd Guest Bedroom & Study	27	19	21	27	28½
Master Bedroom	27½	23	28	27	25
Staircase & Laundry	28	20	23	27	17
Kitchen	29	28	26	29	28
Living/Dining Room	28	22	27½	23½	26½
Ensuite	25½	23	24	29½	28½
Terrace	29½ (-1)	21	28½ (-1)	25 (-1)	30 (-1)
Challenge Apartment: Room 1	24½	22	26½	26	29
Challenge Apartment: Room 2	29	24½	28½	24½	28
Auction Order	5th	1st	3rd	2nd	4th
Auction Result	= 4th	2nd	3rd	1st	= 4th

== Results ==
=== Room reveals ===
Week	Room	Judges' verdict		Contestants' verdict	
Week	Room	Winner	Score	Winner	Score
1	1st Guest Bedroom	Shannon & Simon	27	Michael & Carlene	34½
2	Main Bathroom	Chris & Jenna	30	Darren & Deanne	37½
3	2nd Guest Bedroom and Study	Darren & Deanne	28½	Darren & Deanne	33
4	Master Bedroom	Max & Karstan	28	Simon & Shannon	34½
5	Staircase and Laundry	Michael & Carlene	28	Max & Karstan	51½
6	Kitchen	Simon & Shannon	29	Chris & Jenna	36½
7	Living and Dining	Michael & Carlene	28	Darren & Deanne	32
8	Ensuite Bathrooms	Shannon & Simon	29½	Chris & Jenna	46½
9	Terraces	Darren & Deanne	30 (-1) 29	—N/a	—N/a
10	Challenge Apartment: Room 1	Darren & Deanne	29	—N/a	—N/a
11	Challenge Apartment: Room 2	Michael & Carlene	29	—N/a	—N/a

=== Judges' Scores ===
Colour key:
Highest Score
Lowest Score

Summary of judges' scores
Week	Area(s)	Scores	Teams				
Week	Area(s)	Scores	Michael & Carlene	Chris & Jenna	Karstan & Maxine	Shannon & Simon	Darren & Deanne
1	1st Guest Bedroom	Darren	9	7½	6	9	8½
1	1st Guest Bedroom	Shaynna	8½	8	5	9	8½
1	1st Guest Bedroom	Neale	8½	7½	6	9	9½
1	1st Guest Bedroom	Total	26	23	17	27	26½
2	Main Bathroom	Darren	8½	10	8½	7½	9½
2	Main Bathroom	Shaynna	7½	10	8½	7½	9
2	Main Bathroom	Neale	8	10	9	8	9½
2	Main Bathroom	Total	24	30	26	23	28
3	2nd Guest Bedroom & Study	Darren	9	6	7	10	9½
3	2nd Guest Bedroom & Study	Shaynna	9	6½	6½	9	9½
3	2nd Guest Bedroom & Study	Neale	9	6½	7½	8	9½
3	2nd Guest Bedroom & Study	Total	27	19	21	27	28½
4	Master Bedroom	Darren	9½	8	9½	9	8½
4	Master Bedroom	Shaynna	9	7½	10	9	8½
4	Master Bedroom	Neale	9	7½	9½	9	8
4	Master Bedroom	Total	27½	23	29	27	25
5	Staircase & Laundry	Darren	9½	7	8	9½	6½
5	Staircase & Laundry	Shaynna	10	6½	7½	9	5½
5	Staircase & Laundry	Neale	9½	6½	7½	8½	5
5	Staircase & Laundry	Total	29	20	23	27	17
6	Kitchen	Darren	9½	9½	9	10	9½
6	Kitchen	Shaynna	10	9	8½	9	9
6	Kitchen	Neale	9½	9½	8½	10	9½
6	Kitchen	Total	29	28	26	29	28
7	Living/Dining Room	Darren	9½	7	9½	7½	9
7	Living/Dining Room	Shaynna	9	7½	9	8	9
7	Living/Dining Room	Neale	9½	7½	9	8	8½
7	Living/Dining Room	Total	28	22	27½	23½	26½
8	Ensuite	Darren	8½	7½	8	10	10
8	Ensuite	Shaynna	8½	7½	8	9½	9
8	Ensuite	Neale	8½	8	8	10	9½
8	Ensuite	Total	25½	23	24	29½	28½
9	Terrace	Darren	9½	7	9½	9	10
9	Terrace	Shaynna	10	6½	9½	7	10
9	Terrace	Neale	10	7½	9½	9	10
9	Terrace	Total	29½ (-1) 28½	21	28½ (-1) 27½	25 (-1) 24	30 (-1) 29
10	Challenge Apartment: Room 1	Darren	8	7½	8½	9	9½
10	Challenge Apartment: Room 1	Shaynna	8	7	8½	8½	9½
10	Challenge Apartment: Room 1	Neale	8½	7½	9½	8½	10
10	Challenge Apartment: Room 1	Total	24½	22	26½	26	29
11	Challenge Apartment: Room 2	Darren	9	8	9½	8	9½
11	Challenge Apartment: Room 2	Shaynna	10	8	9½	8	9
11	Challenge Apartment: Room 2	Neale	10	8½	9½	8½	9½
11	Challenge Apartment: Room 2	Total	29	24½	28½	24½	28

=== Challenge Apartment ===
Score Rank	Apartment 6		Prize^{[f]}
Score Rank	Week 10	Week 11	Prize^{[f]}
Score Rank	Room 1	Room 2	Prize^{[f]}
1st	Darren & Deanne	Michael & Carlene	$20,000
2nd	Max & Karstan		$15,000
3rd	Shannon & Simon	Darren & Deanne	$10,000
4th	Michael & Carlene	Chris & Jenna; Simon & Shannon	$0
5th	Chris & Jenna	—N/a	$0

Team	Total off Reserve	Original Reserve	New Reserve
Max & Karstan	$30,000	$1.700m	$1.670m
Darren & Deanne	$30,000	$1.400m	$1.370m
Michael & Carlene	$20,000	$1.400m	$1.380m
Shannon & Simon	$10,000	$1.575m	$1.565m
Chris & Jenna	$0	$1.500m	

=== Auction ===
Rank	Couple	Reserve	Auction Result	Profit	Total Winnings	Auction Order
1	Shannon & Simon	$1.565m	$1.900m	$335,000	$435,000	2nd
2	Chris & Jenna	$1.500m	$1.810m	$310,000	$310,000	1st
3	Karstan & Maxine	$1.670m	$1.710m	$40,000	$40,000	3rd
4 =	Michael & Carlene	$1.380m	$1.390m	$10,000	$10,000	5th
4 =	Darren & Deanne	$1.370m	$1.380m	$10,000	$10,000	4th

== Ratings ==
The Block: Glasshouse metropolitan viewership and nightly position Colour key: – Highest rating episode and week during the series – Lowest rating episode and week during the series
Week	Episode		Original airdate	Timeslot (approx.)	Viewers (millions)^{[a]}	Nightly rank^{[a]}	Source	Week Avg
1	1	"Welcome to The Block"	27 July 2014	Sunday 6:30 pm	1.374	#1		0.979
1	2	"First Room Begins"	28 July 2014	Monday 7:30 pm	0.926	#7		0.979
1	3	"Settle the Score"	29 July 2014	Tuesday 7:30 pm	1.002	#6		0.979
1	4	"Building Delays"	30 July 2014	Wednesday 7:30 pm	0.813	#9		0.979
1	5	"Design Disputes"	31 July 2014	Thursday 7:30 pm	0.781	#7		0.979
2	6	"Guest Bedroom Room Reveal"	3 August 2014	Sunday 6:30 pm	1.377	#1		1.154
2	7	"Scotty's Game Changer"	4 August 2014	Monday 7:30 pm	1.112	#5		1.154
2	8	"Safety First"	5 August 2014	Tuesday 7:30 pm	1.128	#2		1.154
2	9	"Challenge Day – Love Thy Neighbour"	6 August 2014	Wednesday 7:30 pm	1.090	#3		1.154
2	10	"Problem After Problem"	7 August 2014	Thursday 7:30 pm	1.063	#2		1.154
2	11	"The Block Unlocked"	8 August 2014^{[b]}	Friday 7:30 pm	—N/a	—N/a		1.154
2	11	"The Block Unlocked"	9 August 2014^{[c]}	Saturday 7:00 pm	—N/a	—N/a		1.154
3	12	"Main Bathrooms Reveal"	10 August 2014	Sunday 6:30 pm	1.496	#1		1.073
3	13	"The Jury Votes"	11 August 2014	Monday 7:30 pm	1.231	#1		1.073
3	14	"Secret Rooms and Building Delays"	12 August 2014	Tuesday 7:30 pm	1.091	#3		1.073
3	15	"Pop Up Shop Challenge"	13 August 2014^{[b]}^{[c]}	Wednesday 7:30 pm	1.024	#4		1.073
3	16	"Pop Up Shop Politics"	14 August 2014^{[d]}	Thursday 7:30 pm	0.525	#20		1.073
3	17	"The Block Unlocked"	15 August 2014^{[b]}	Friday 7:30 pm	—N/a	—N/a		1.073
3	17	"The Block Unlocked"	16 August 2014^{[c]}	Saturday 7:00 pm	—N/a	—N/a		1.073
4	18	"Bedrooms and Study Room Revealed"	17 August 2014	Sunday 6:30 pm	1.498	#1		1.122
4	19	"Jury With a Difference"	18 August 2014	Monday 7:30 pm	1.280	#1		1.122
4	20	"Take Down The Walls"	19 August 2014	Tuesday 7:30 pm	1.192	#1		1.122
4	21	"Taking Shape"	20 August 2014^{[b]}^{[c]}	Wednesday 7:30 pm	1.056	#3		1.122
4	22	"In Trouble"	21 August 2014^{[d]}	Thursday 7:30 pm	0.585	#17		1.122
4	23	"The Block Unlocked"	22 August 2014^{[b]}	Friday 7:30 pm	—N/a	—N/a		1.122
4	23	"The Block Unlocked"	23 August 2014^{[c]}	Saturday 7:00 pm	—N/a	—N/a		1.122
5	24	"Master Bedrooms Revealed"	24 August 2014	Sunday 6:30 pm	1.641	#1		1.270
5	25	"The Block Jury Votes"	25 August 2014	Monday 7:30 pm	1.191	#1		1.270
5	26	"Pop Up Shop is Revealed"	26 August 2014	Tuesday 7:30 pm	1.181	#1		1.270
5	27	"The Best Challenge Ever"	27 August 2014^{[b]}^{[c]}	Wednesday 7:30 pm	1.066	#5		1.270
5	28	"Staircases and Laundries"	28 August 2014^{[d]}	Thursday 7:30 pm	—N/a	—N/a		1.270
5	29	"The Block Unlocked"	29 August 2014^{[b]}	Friday 7:30 pm	—N/a	—N/a		1.270
5	29	"The Block Unlocked"	30 August 2014^{[c]}	Saturday 3:00 pm	—N/a	—N/a		1.270
6	30	"Laundry and Staircase Reveal"	31 August 2014	Sunday 6:30 pm	1.548	#1		1.182
6	31	"The Buyers Vote"	1 September 2014	Monday 7:30 pm	1.352	#1		1.182
6	32	"Kitchen Build Continues"	2 September 2014	Tuesday 7:30 pm	1.211	#1		1.182
6	33	"Brothers' Kitchen Nightmare"	3 September 2014^{[b]}^{[c]}	Wednesday 7:30 pm	1.151	#1		1.182
6	34	"Will There be an Audit?"	4 September 2014^{[d]}	Thursday 7:30 pm	0.650	#14		1.182
6	35	"The Block Unlocked"	5 September 2014^{[b]}	Friday 7:30 pm	—N/a	—N/a		1.182
6	35	"The Block Unlocked"	6 September 2014^{[c]}	Saturday 3:00 pm	—N/a	—N/a		1.182
7	36	"Kitchen Reveal"	7 September 2014	Sunday 6:30 pm	1.622	#1		1.427
7	37	"The Jury Vote"	8 September 2014	Monday 7:30 pm	1.556	#1		1.427
7	38	"Living and Dining on a Budget"	9 September 2014	Tuesday 7:30 pm	1.425	#1		1.427
7	39	"Australian Made Challenge"	10 September 2014	Wednesday 7:30 pm	1.249	#1		1.427
7	40	"The Block Audit"	11 September 2014	Thursday 7:30 pm	1.283	#1		1.427
7	41	"The Block Unlocked"	12 September 2014^{[b]}	Friday 7:30 pm	—N/a	—N/a		1.427
7	41	"The Block Unlocked"	13 September 2014^{[c]}	Saturday 3:00 pm	—N/a	—N/a		1.427
8	42	"Living and Dining Room Reveal"	14 September 2014	Sunday 6:30 pm	1.695	#1		1.210
8	43	"The Jury Revenge"	15 September 2014	Monday 7:30 pm	1.507	#1		1.210
8	44	"Keith's Discovery"	16 September 2014	Tuesday 7:30 pm	1.364	#1		1.210
8	45	"Reno Replay Challenge Begins"	17 September 2014	Wednesday 7:30 pm	1.167	#1		1.210
8	46	"Reno Replay Challenge Results"	18 September 2014	Thursday 7:30 pm	1.180	#1		1.210
8	47	"The Block Unlocked"	19 September 2014^{[b]}	Friday 7:30 pm	—N/a	—N/a		1.210
8	47	"The Block Unlocked"	20 September 2014^{[c]}	Saturday 7:00 pm	0.349	#15		1.210
9	48	"Ensuite Reveal"	21 September 2014	Sunday 6:30 pm	1.664	#1		1.318
9	49	"Jury Votes"	22 September 2014	Monday 7:30 pm	1.327	#1		1.318
9	50	"Children First Charity Challenge"	23 September 2014	Tuesday 7:30 pm	1.279	#1		1.318
9	51	"Terraces Take Shape"	24 September 2014	Wednesday 7:30 pm	1.185	#1		1.318
9	52	"Keith Faces an Uprising"	25 September 2014	Thursday 7:30 pm	1.134	#1		1.318
9	53	"The Block Unlocked"	26 September 2014^{[b]}	Friday 7:30 pm	—N/a	—N/a		1.318
9	53	"The Block Unlocked"	27 September 2014^{[c]}	Saturday 7:00 pm	—N/a	—N/a		1.318
10	54	"Terraces are Revealed"	28 September 2014	Sunday 6:30 pm	1.546	#1		1.210
10	55	"Block's Biggest Bust Up"	29 September 2014	Monday 7:30 pm	1.333	#1		1.210
10	56	"Apartment 6 Challenge Gets Competitive"	30 September 2014	Tuesday 6:30 pm	1.184	#1		1.210
10	57	"Keith Recruits New Labourers"	1 October 2014	Wednesday 7:30 pm	1.137	#1		1.210
10	58	"Keith Accused Of Playing Favourites"	2 October 2014	Thursday 7:30 pm	1.062	#2		1.210
10	59	"The Block Unlocked"	3 October 2014^{[b]}^{[c]}	Friday 7:30 pm	0.615	#9		1.210
11	60	"Apartment 6 - Reveal 1"	6 October 2014^{[e]}	Monday 7:30 pm	1.481	#1		1.251
11	61	"Darren Defies Keith's Kitchen Request"	7 October 2014	Tuesday 6:30 pm	1.390	#1		1.251
11	62	"Brothers Caught In Rooftop Hell"	8 October 2014	Wednesday 7:30 pm	1.319	#1		1.251
11	63	"Apartment 6 - Reveal 2"	9 October 2014	Thursday 7:30 pm	1.388	#1		1.251
11	64	"The Block Unlocked"	10 October 2014^{[b]}^{[c]}	Friday 7:30 pm	0.625	#9		1.251
12	65	"Grand Final"	12 October 2014	Sunday 6:30 pm	1.796	#4		2.296
12	65	"Auctions"	12 October 2014	Sunday 6:30 pm	2.327	#2		2.296
12	65	"Winner Announced"	12 October 2014	Sunday 6:30 pm	2.764	#1		2.296

- ^{a} Ratings data is from OzTAM and represents the live and same day average viewership from the 5 largest Australian metropolitan centres (Sydney, Melbourne, Brisbane, Perth and Adelaide).

== Notes ==
- ^{b} Aired in Melbourne, Adelaide and Perth
- ^{c} Aired in Sydney and Brisbane
- Due to Thursday night football, the Thursday night episode airs on Wednesdays in Sydney and Brisbane recurring after Wednesday night episode, whereas in Melbourne, Adelaide and Perth air the Thursday night episode on the Thursday.
- ^{d} Thursday night ratings only include Melbourne, Adelaide and Perth
- ^{e} Sunday night episode will air Monday night due to the Football Grand Final
- ^{f} The prize money that the team receives is taken off their reserve
