= The Block season 2 =

The Block
- Season 2
- No. of episodes: 26

Release
- Original network: Nine Network
- Original release: 18 April – 25 July 2004

Season chronology
- ← Previous; Season 1 Next → Season 3

The site used for the second season, as seen several days prior to auction.

The second season of Australian reality television series The Block, retroactively titled The Block 2004, aired on the Nine Network. Jamie Durie returned as host from the first season as did judge John McGrath. It first premiered on 18 April 2004.

Following the success of the first season, an expanded second season of 26 episodes, airing twice weekly, premiered on 18 April 2004. The series was again set in Sydney, although in the suburb of Manly rather than Bondi where the first season was located.

== Auction ==
Auction results
Rank	Couple	Reserve	Auction Result	Profit	Total Winnings	Auction order
1	Andrew Rochford and Jamie Nicholson	$790,000	$868,000	$78,000	$178,000	3rd
2	Jason and Kirsten Johnson	$795,000	$872,000	$77,000	$77,000	2nd
= 3	Steven Starkey and Richard Sterry	$800,000	$800,000	$0		4th
= 3	Matt Martino and Jane Newton	$795,000	$795,000	$0		1st

== Reception ==
Though the viewership was lower this season from season one, the season was successful in the ratings with an average viewership of 1.6 million watching daily, and the Grand Finale of the season had a viewership of 2.273 million.

== Controversy ==
Two original contestants, Dani and Monique Bacha, left the program in January 2004, two weeks into the second series, when it was reported that Dani had spent six months in jail in 2002 following his conviction for a drug-related offence and Monique's grandfather had died. The couple decided it was best to leave in order to protect friends and family. Andrew Rochford and Jamie Nicholson replaced Dani and Monique Bacha.
