= The Block season 10 =

The Block
- Season 10
- No. of episodes: 58

Release
- Original network: Nine Network
- Original release: 27 January – 29 April 2015

Season chronology
- ← Previous; Season 9 Next → Season 11

The tenth season of Australian reality television series The Block, titled The Block: Triple Threat, premiered on Tuesday, 27 January 2015 on Nine Network. Scott Cam (host) and Shelley Craft (Challenge Master) returned from the previous season, as did the three judges: Neale Whitaker, Shaynna Blaze and Darren Palmer.

The Block producer Watercress has lodged an application with Stonnington City Council to extend, reconfigure and renovate a rectangle-shaped, 1970's style, three-level block of flats it bought four months ago for $5.7 million. The Block is located at 27 Darling Street in South Yarra which will be transformed into four north-facing townhouses – some able to enjoy city views from upper levels.

Darren and Deanne Jolly from former The Block: Glasshouse are back to challenge former fan favourites Bec and George Douros and Perth's Kim Owen and Matt Di Costa for one spot for returning players in the 2015 competition. Six teams of new players will contest a number of challenges, before being whittled down to a final three, who will then go on to renovate an apartment block in South Yarra, with the surviving fan favourite couple.

Former contestant Dan Reilly also returned from seasons 5 and 6, but this time as apprentice foreman, or 'foreboy' under Keith Schleiger. He was a qualified carpenter, and became a qualified builder before he applied for the role. He was also brought in to ease the workload on Keith Schleiger, who was reported to be sick and exhausted by the end of the last series.

== Former Contestants ==
The Block: Triple Threat will see the return of three former block couples in challenges for one spot as this season's contestants

Couple	Relationship	Season
Bec and George	Married	7 (Sky High)
Matt and Kim	Married	7 (Sky High)
Darren and Deanne	Married	9 (Glass House)

Green: This couple won the challenge and became the returning Block couple on The Block: Triple Threat.

Red: This couple failed to win the elimination challenge and did not become the returning Block couple.

== Challenge Contestants ==
The Block: Triple Threat will introduce six new teams that will go head to head to receive one of three spots in the competition.

Rank	Couple	Relationship	Location
4	Ebony & Luke	Brother & Sister	Western Australia
1	Ayden & Jess	Married with Children	Queensland
1	Tim & Anastasia	Married with Children	South Australia
6	Mark & JJ	Engaged	New South Wales
5	Aimee & Brooke	Cousins	Victoria
1	Josho & Charlotte	Boyfriend & Girlfriend	New South Wales

Green: This couple won the challenge and became a Block couple on The Block: Triple Threat.

Red: This couple failed to win the elimination challenge and did not become a Block couple.

== Contestants ==
Apt	Couple	Age	Location	Relationship	Occupations
1	Josh Terrett & Charlotte Ekas	Both 25	Sydney, NSW	Boyfriend & Girlfriend	Chippy & Food Stylist
2	Tim & Anastasia Ielasi	40 & 38	Adelaide, SA	Married with Children	General manager & Operations Manager
3	Ayden & Jess Hogan	30 & 31	Gold Coast, QLD	Married with Children	Cabinet Maker & Sales Manager
4	Darren & Deanne Jolly	30 & 44	Melbourne, VIC	Married with Children	Builder & Stay at Home Mum

== The Block-Open House ==
The Block-Open House is a new format (replacing unlocked) shown once a week which shows former contestants fixing and/or renovating rooms and areas of peoples home into modern looks. It was unsuccessful with ratings and was cancelled after seven episodes.

== Score history ==
Teams' progress through the competition
Scores:	Teams			
Scores:	Josh & Charlotte	Tim & Anastasia	Ayden & Jess	Darren & Deanne
Rooms	Scores			
Guest Bedroom	21	18½	21½	27½
Main Bathroom	24½	26	21	27½^{(-1)}^{[B]}
Second Bedroom	24½	27^{(-1)}^{[B]}	22½	25
Laundry/Powder Room/Cellar	27	26	23	28½^{(-1)}^{[B]}
Living/Dining Room	25^{(-1)}^{[B]}	21	22	18
Ensuite	28½	23	25½	27½^{(-1)}^{[B]}
Master Bedroom	30^{[E]}	24½	24½	28^{(-1)}^{[B]}
Kitchen	22½	23½	26	21^{(-1)}^{[B]}
Study & Stairs	19	8	29^{(-1)}^{[B]}	15
Terrace	28½	23	25	30
Auction Order	4th	1st	2nd	3rd
Auction Result	2nd	3rd	4th	1st

== Results ==
=== Room reveals ===
This season of The Block had a new room judging. Alongside The Block judges, each week three real estate buyers also judged the rooms and the winner received money towards their apartment

Week	Room	Judges' verdict		Buyers'/Contestants' verdict^{[C]}	
Week	Room	Winner	Score	Winner	Score
1	Guest Bedroom	Darren and Deanne	27½	—N/a	—N/a
2	Main Bathroom	Darren and Deanne	27½ (-1) 26½^{[B]}	Darren and Deanne	49
3	Second Bedroom	Tim and Anastasia	27 (-1) 26^{[B]}	Charlotte and Josh	48
4	Laundry/Powder Room/Cellar	Darren and Deanne	28½ (-1) 27½^{[B]}	Tim and Anastasia	50½
5	Living and Dining Room	Charlotte and Josh	25 (-1) 24^{[B]}	Tim and Anastasia	39
6	Ensuite	Charlotte and Josh	28½	Darren and Deanne	47
7	Master Bedroom	Darren and Deanne	28 (-1) 27^{[B]}	Charlotte and Josh	56
8	Kitchen	Ayden and Jess	26	Tim and Anastasia	46½
9	Study and Stairs	Ayden and Jess	29 (-1) 28^{[B]}	Ayden and Jess	47
10	Terrace	Darren and Deanne	30	—N/a	—N/a

==== Judges' scores ====
Colour key:
Highest Score
Lowest Score

Summary of judges' scores
Week	Area(s)	Scores	Josh & Charlotte	Tim & Anastasia	Ayden & Jess	Darren & Dea
1	Guest bedroom	Darren	7	6	7	9
1	Guest bedroom	John	7	6	7	9
1	Guest bedroom	Neale	7	6½	7½	9½
1	Guest bedroom	Total	21	18½	21½	27½
2	Main bathroom	John	7½	8½	6½	9
2	Main bathroom	Shaynna	8½	8½	6½	9
2	Main bathroom	Neale	8½	9	6½	9½
2	Main bathroom	Total	24½	26	21	27½
3	Second bedroom	Darren	8½	9	8	9
3	Second bedroom	Shaynna	8	9	7	7½
3	Second bedroom	Neale	8	9	7½	9
3	Second bedroom	Total	24½	27^{(-1)}^{[B]}	22½	25½
4	Laundry, powder room & cellar	Darren	9	9	7½	9½
4	Laundry, powder room & cellar	Shaynna	9	9	8	9½
4	Laundry, powder room & cellar	Neale	9	9	7½	9½
4	Laundry, powder room & cellar	Total	27	27	23	28½^{(-1)}^{[B]}
5	Living & dining room	Darren	8	7	7	6½
5	Living & dining room	Shaynna	8½	7	7	5
5	Living & dining room	Neale	8½	7	8	6½
5	Living & dining room	Total	25^{(-1)}^{[B]}	21	22	18
6	Ensuite	Darren	9½	7½	8½	9
6	Ensuite	Shaynna	9½	7½	8½	9
6	Ensuite	Neale	9½	8	8½	9½
6	Ensuite	Total	28½	23	25½	27½^{(-1)} ^{[B]}
7	Master bedroom & walk-in wardrobe	Darren	10	8	7½	9½
7	Master bedroom & walk-in wardrobe	Shaynna	10	8½	8	9
7	Master bedroom & walk-in wardrobe	Neale	10	8	9	9½
7	Master bedroom & walk-in wardrobe	Total	30 ^{[E]}	24½	24½	28^{(-1)}^{[B]}
8	Kitchen	Darren	7	8	8½	7
8	Kitchen	Shaynna	7½	7½	8½	6½
8	Kitchen	Neale	8	8	9	7½
8	Kitchen	Total	22½	23½	26	21^{(-1)}^{[B]}
9	Study & stairs	Darren	6	2	9½	6
9	Study & stairs	Shaynna	6	3	9½	3
9	Study & stairs	Neale	7	3	10	6
9	Study & stairs	Total	19	8	29^{(-1)}^{[B]}	15
10	Terrace	Darren	9½	7½	8½	10
10	Terrace	Shaynna	9½	7	8	10
10	Terrace	Neale	9½	8½	8½	10
10	Terrace	Total	28½	23	25	30
11	Overall	Darren	9	7	8½	9
11	Overall	Shaynna	9	6½	8½	9
11	Overall	Neale	8½	6½	9	9½
11	Overall	Buyers	24½	23	26	27
11	Overall	Total	51	43	52	54½

=== Auction ===
Rank	Couple	Reserve	Auction Result	Profit	Total Winnings	Auction Order
1	Darren and Deanne	$1.455m	$2.290m	$835,000	$935,000	3rd
2	Josh and Charlotte	$1.390m	$2.200m	$810,000	$810,000	4th
3	Tim and Anastasia	$1.420m	$2.175m	$755,000	$755,000	1st
4	Ayden and Jess	$1.335m	$2.000m	$665,000	$665,000	2nd

== Ratings ==
The Block: Triple Threat metropolitan viewership and nightly position Colour key: – Highest rating during the series – Lowest rating during the series
Week	Episode		Original airdate	Timeslot	Viewers (millions)^{[a]}	Nightly rank^{[a]}	Source	Week Avg
1	1	"Welcome to The Block!"	27 January 2015	Tuesday 7:30 pm	0.860	#8		0.868
1	2	"Elimination Number One"	28 January 2015	Wednesday 7:30 pm	0.965	#4		0.868
1	3	"Elimination Challenge Two"	29 January 2015	Thursday 7:30 pm	0.779	#7		0.868
2	4	"Who's the Next to Go?"	2 February 2015	Monday 7:30 pm	0.802	#12		0.769
2	5	"The Final Elimination Round Begins"	3 February 2015	Tuesday 7:30 pm	0.739	#11		0.769
2	6	"Bathrooms in 72 hours!"	4 February 2015	Wednesday 7:30 pm	0.683	#10		0.769
2	7	"Meet the Blockheads"	5 February 2015	Thursday 7:30 pm	0.852	#4		0.769
3	8	"The Triple Threat Arrives"	9 February 2015	Monday 7:30 pm	0.919	#8		0.750
3	9	"Let the Renovating Begin"	10 February 2015	Tuesday 7:30 pm	0.742	#12		0.750
3	10	"Demolition and Design"	11 February 2015	Wednesday 7:30 pm	0.720	#11		0.750
3	11	"Open House – Episode 1"	12 February 2015	Thursday 7:30 pm	0.620	#11		0.750
4	12	"Bedrooms Are Revealed"	15 February 2015	Sunday 6:30 pm	0.982	#6		0.783
4	13	"Bathroom Week Begins"	16 February 2015	Monday 7:30 pm	0.755	#13		0.783
4	14	"The Rug Rat Challenge"	17 February 2015	Tuesday 7:30 pm	0.779	#11		0.783
4	15	"Bathroom Week Continues"	18 February 2015	Wednesday 7:30 pm	0.738	#10		0.783
4	16	"Open House – Episode 2"	19 February 2015	Thursday 7:30 pm	0.664	#9		0.783
5	17	"Bathroom Reveals"	22 February 2015	Sunday 7:00 pm	1.114	#1		0.811
5	18	"Buyers Jury"	23 February 2015	Monday 7:30 pm	0.832	#9		0.811
5	19	"Jimmy Possum Challenge"	24 February 2015	Tuesday 7:30 pm	0.793	#10		0.811
5	20	"The battle of the seagrass wallpaper"	25 February 2015	Wednesday 7:30 pm	0.753	#8		0.811
5	21	"Open House – Episode 3"	26 February 2015	Thursday 7:30 pm	0.562	#10		0.811
6	22	"Bedrooms Revealed"	1 March 2015	Sunday 7:00 pm	1.016	#2		0.768
6	23	"Buyers Jury"	2 March 2015	Monday 7:30 pm	0.723	#13		0.768
6	24	"Make A Wish Challenge"	3 March 2015	Tuesday 7:30 pm	0.726	#11		0.768
6	25	"Three Room Reality"	4 March 2015	Wednesday 7:30 pm	0.609	#10		0.768
6	26	"Open House – Episode 4"	7 March 2015	Saturday 4:00 pm	—N/a	—N/a		0.768
7	27	"Powder Room, Laundry and Cellar Reveal"	9 March 2015	Monday 7:30 pm^{D}	0.926	#6		0.738
7	28	"Buyers Jury"	10 March 2015	Tuesday 7:30 pm	0.706	#11		0.738
7	29	"Model Tenants Challenge"	11 March 2015	Wednesday 7:30 pm	0.638	#12		0.738
7	30	"Living And Dining Rooms Take Shape"	12 March 2015	Thursday 7:30 pm	0.680	#11		0.738
7	31	"Open House – Episode 5"	15 March 2015	Sunday 2:30 pm	—N/a	—N/a		0.738
8	32	"Episode 32"	15 March 2015	Sunday 7:00 pm	1.103	#4		0.852
8	32	"Living and Dining Rooms Revealed"	15 March 2015	Sunday 7:00 pm	1.205	#2		0.852
8	33	"Shaynna Mentors Dea"	16 March 2015	Monday 7:30 pm	0.861	#9		0.852
8	34	"Face Value Challenge"	17 March 2015	Tuesday 7:30 pm	0.821	#10		0.852
8	35	"Ensuite Week Continues"	18 March 2015	Wednesday 7:30 pm	0.756	#9		0.852
8	36	"Open House – Episode 6"	19 March 2015	Thursday 7:30 pm	0.370	#19		0.852
9	37	"Episode 37"	22 March 2015	Sunday 7:00 pm	1.137	#3		0.987
9	37	"Ensuites Revealed"	22 March 2015	Sunday 7:00 pm	1.261	#1		0.987
9	38	"Master Bedroom Begins"	23 March 2015	Monday 7:30 pm	0.836	#10		0.987
9	39	"style to Sell Challenge"	24 March 2015	Tuesday 7:30 pm	0.816	#10		0.987
9	40	"The Wine Audit"	25 March 2015	Wednesday 7:30 pm	0.885	#6		0.987
9	41	"Open House – Episode 7"	28 March 2015	Saturday 3:00 pm	—N/a	—N/a		0.987
10^{[F]}	42	"Episode 42"	30 March 2015	Monday 7:30 pm^{D}	1.111	#2		1.020
10^{[F]}	42	"Master Bedrooms Revealed"	30 March 2015	Monday 7:30 pm^{D}	1.271	#1		1.020
10^{[F]}	43	"The Block Triple Threat - Story so far"	4 April 2015	Saturday 4:00 pm	—N/a	—N/a		1.020
10^{[F]}	44	"Kitchen Week Begins"	5 April 2015	Sunday 7:00 pm	0.783	#3		1.020
10^{[F]}	45	"Kitchen Week"	6 April 2015	Monday 7:30 pm	0.986	#8		1.020
10^{[F]}	46	"Challenge Day"	7 April 2015	Tuesday 7:30 pm	0.949	#7		1.020
11	47	"Episode 47"	12 April 2015	Sunday 7:00 pm	1.082	#6		0.961
11	47	"Kitchens Revealed"	12 April 2015	Sunday 7:00 pm	1.112	#5		0.961
11	48	"Study and Stairs"	13 April 2015	Monday 7:30 pm	0.923	#7		0.961
11	49	"Triple Threat Radio"	14 April 2015	Tuesday 7:30 pm	0.886	#7		0.961
11	50	"Kitchen Capers Challenge"	15 April 2015	Wednesday 7:30 pm	0.801	#9		0.961
12	51	"Episode 51"	19 April 2015	Sunday 7:00 pm	1.183	#6		1.110
12	51	"Study and Stairs Revealed"	19 April 2015	Sunday 7:00 pm	1.284	#3		1.110
12	52	"Terrace Week Begins"	20 April 2015	Monday 7:30 pm	0.981	#6		1.110
12	53	"Terraces Take Shape"	21 April 2015	Tuesday 7:30 pm	1.039	#6		1.110
12	54	"The Budget Blowout"	22 April 2015	Wednesday 7:30 pm	1.061	#6		1.110
13	55	"Episode 55"	26 April 2015	Sunday 7:00 pm	1.218	#5		1.505
13	55	"Terraces Revealed"	26 April 2015	Sunday 7:00 pm	1.423	#1		1.505
13	56	"The Final Challenge"	27 April 2015	Monday 7:30 pm	1.113	#4		1.505
13	57	"Final Inspection"	28 April 2015	Tuesday 7:30 pm	1.141	#3		1.505
13	58	"Grand Final"	29 April 2015	Wednesday 7:30 pm	1.645	#3		1.505
13	58	"Auctions"	29 April 2015	Wednesday 7:30 pm	1.971	#2		1.505
13	58	"Winner Announced"	29 April 2015	Wednesday 7:30 pm	2.027	#1		1.505

- ^{a} Ratings data is from OzTAM and represents the live and same day average viewership from the 5 largest Australian metropolitan centres (Sydney, Melbourne, Brisbane, Perth and Adelaide).

== Notes ==
- ^{B} The winner of weekly room challenge receives a piece of chalk to subtract one point of a couple's score.
- ^{C} The contestants and buyers verdict is a combined score for a cash prize
- ^{D} Sunday episode aired on Monday due to cricket
- ^{E} Josh and Charlotte were disqualified this week due to not using a bed which they created during The Jimmy Possum Challenge in any of their rooms
- ^{F} This week is divided over two weeks due to Easter break
