= The Block season 3 =

The Block
- Season 3
- No. of episodes: 9

Release
- Original network: Nine Network
- Original release: 22 September – 24 November 2010

Season chronology
- ← Previous; Season 2 Next → Season 4

The third season of Australian reality television series The Block, titled The Block 2010, aired on the Nine Network. Jamie Durie didn't return as host and was replaced by Scott Cam, John McGrath returned as judge & introduced new judge Neale Whitaker, premiered on Wednesday, 22 September 2010 at 7:00 pm.

After a long break, the series was revived in 2010 with a set of four apartments in the upmarket suburb of Vaucluse in Sydney being renovated and Scott Cam replacing Jamie Durie as host.

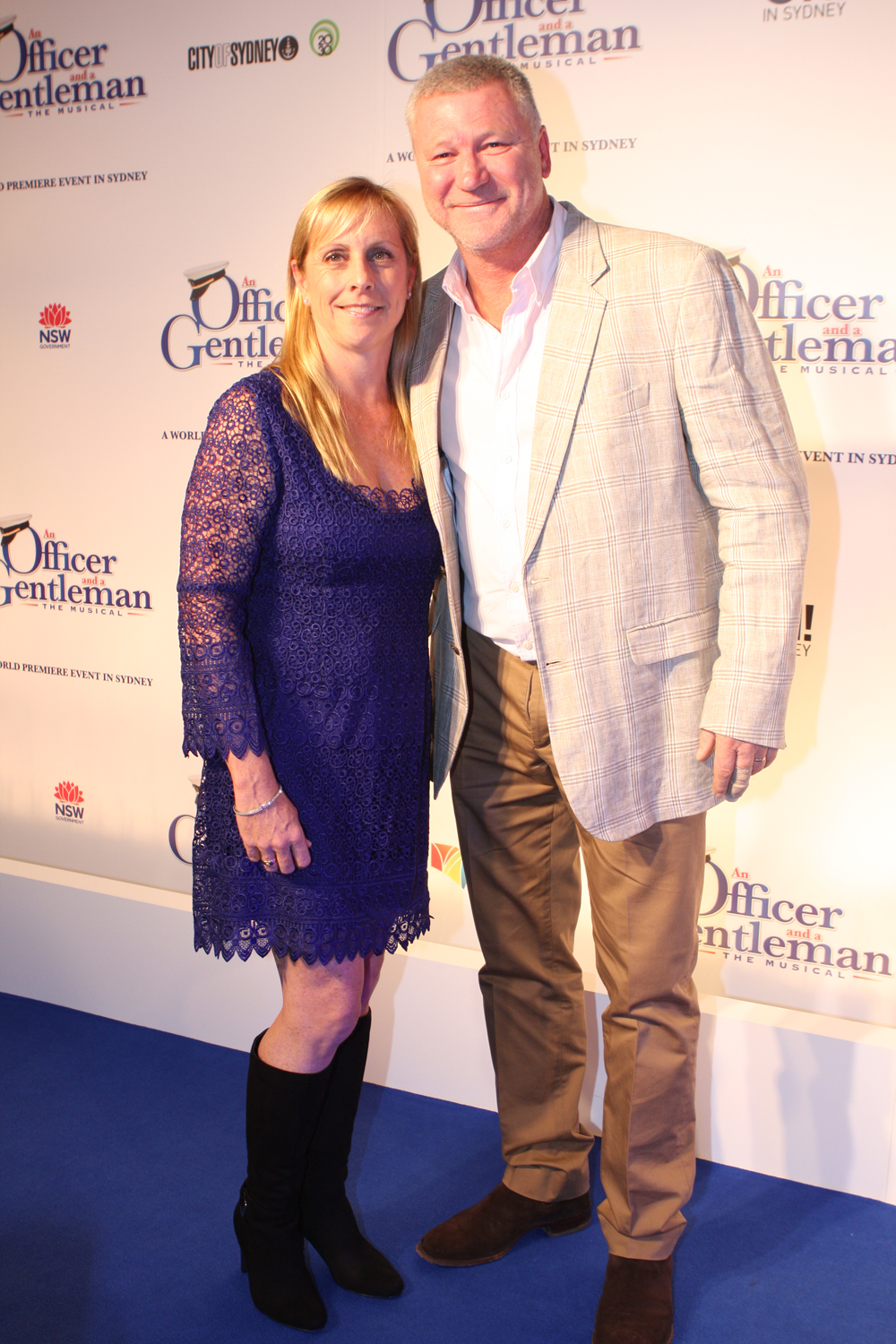
Scott Cam (right), host since 2010

== Results ==
=== Room Reveals ===
Colour key:
Indicates weekly room winner

Weekly results
Week	Room(s)	Costs			
Week	Room(s)	John and Neisha	Mark and Duncan	Erin and Jake	Chez and Brenton
1	Guest room/study	$4,737	$7,205	$5,735	$6,471
2	"Spare room"	$6,457	$6,175	$6,916	$7,331
3	Ensuite	$9,027	$11,114	$10,811	$11,936
4	Master bedroom	$9,465	$7,925	$6,810	$8,806
5	Main bathroom and laundry	$18,640	$13,853	$16,901	$16,486
6	Living room	$15,347	$10,320	$13,883	$9,924
7	Kitchen	$28,039	$31,159	$31,400	$25,720

=== Auction ===
Auction results
Rank	Couple	Reserve	Auction Result	Amount sold for after Auction	Profit	Total Winnings	Auction order
1	John and Neisha Pitt	$900,000	$1.105m	—N/a	$205,000	$305,000	1st
2	Erin and Jake Michael	$910,000	$997,500	—N/a	$87,500	$87,500	4th
3	Mark Bowyer and Duncan Miller	$860,000	$907,000	—N/a	$47,000	$47,000	2nd
4	Cheryl "Chez" Gravina and Brenton Courts	$880,000	not sold at auction	$970,000	$90,000	$90,000	3rd

== Ratings ==
Episode		Original airdate	Timeslot	Viewers (millions)	Nightly rank	Weekly rank	Source
1	"Welcome to The Block"	22 September 2010	Wednesday 7:30–8:30 pm	1.139	#9	#27	
2	"1st Bedroom"	29 September 2010	Wednesday 7:30–8:30 pm	1.125	#10	#23	
3	"Guest Bedroom"	6 October 2010	Wednesday 7:30–8:30 pm	1.122	#5	#16	
4	"The Ensuite"	13 October 2010	Wednesday 7:30–8:30 pm	1.135	#5	#14	
5	"Master Bedroom"	20 October 2010	Wednesday 7:30–8:30 pm	1.197	#5	#13	
6	"Bathroom And Laundry"	27 October 2010	Wednesday 7:30–8:30 pm	1.154	#7	#18	
7	"Living Room"	10 November 2010	Wednesday 7:30–8:30 pm	1.243	#4	#14	
8	"Kitchen And Dining Room"	17 November 2010	Wednesday 7:30–8:30 pm	1.247	#2	#7	
9	"Grand Finale"	24 November 2010	Wednesday 7:30–9:00 pm	1.305	#3	#9	
9	"Winner Announced"	24 November 2010	Wednesday 7:30–9:00 pm	1.716	#1	#2	
