= Caravan Head Bushland Reserve =

Nature reserve in Sydney, Australia

Coordinates: 33.9988°S 151.0819°E

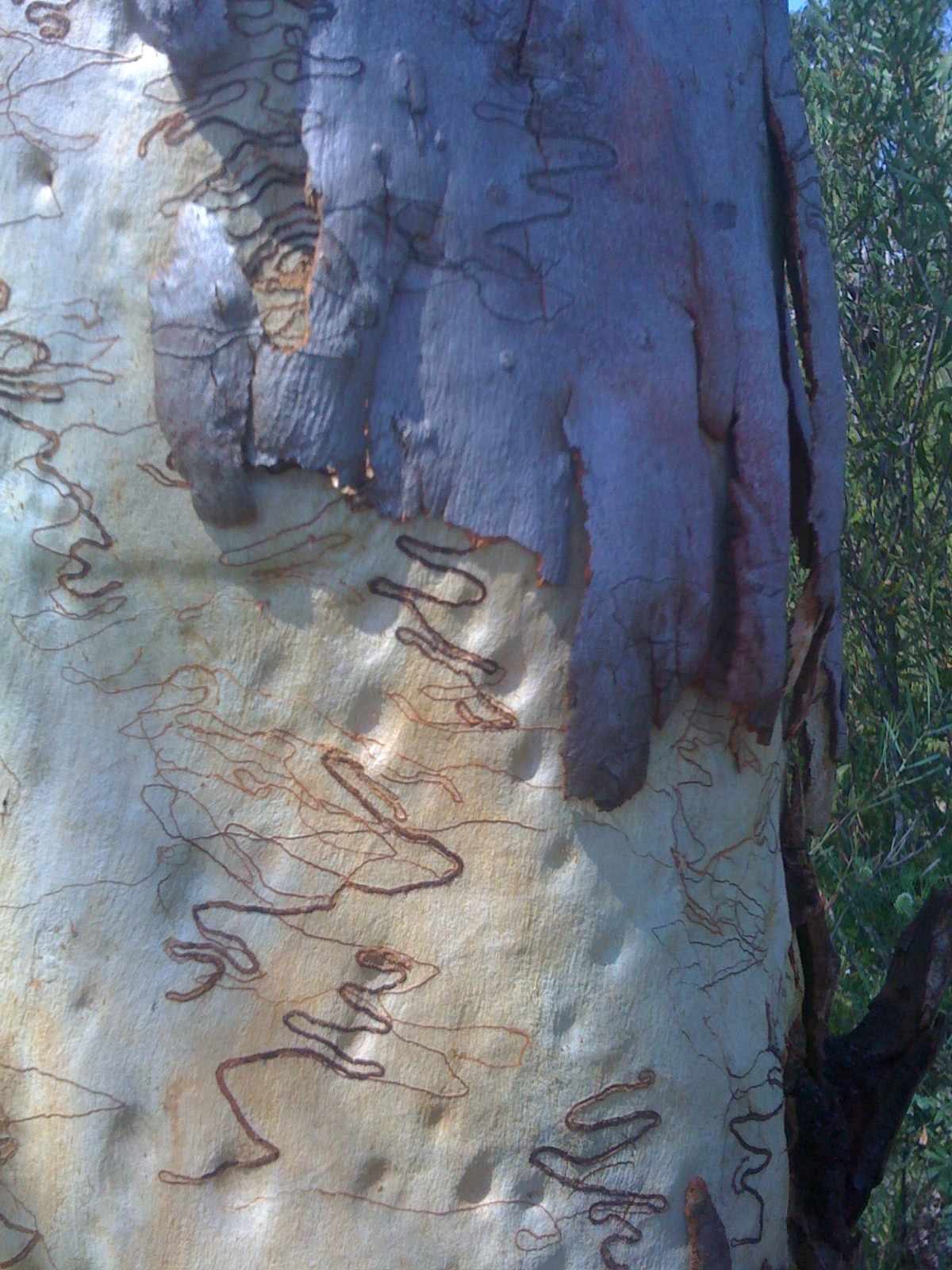
Eucalyptus haemastoma (Scribbly gum) (detail)

Caravan Head Bushland Reserve is a reserve of approximately 2.2ha located in Sutherland Shire, southern Sydney, in the state of New South Wales, Australia.

The reserve is bounded by Caravan Head Road, Cook Road and private property located in the northern part of the suburb of Oyster Bay. It consists of two parcels of land, Lot 9 Deposited Plan 203088 owned by the State of NSW and Lot 31 DP 203088 owned by Sutherland Shire Council. The land is zoned E2 - Environmental Conservation under Sutherland Shire Local Environmental Plan 2015.

It contains a diverse array of native ridgetop native vegetation due to the fact the land was put aside for a proposed school that was never built eventually its ownership was transferred and a development proposal was put forward in the 1990s after local uproar and political support the land was bought by the state government and it was turned into a bushland reserve. During the reserves early history it was severely damaged when the centre of the site was gutted of vegetation and bike tracks cut the remaining vegetation into smaller fragments. After over a decade of regeneration efforts by the local Bushcare Group of volunteer members the site has been nearly restored to its former glory even though it will always need constant attention in the future.

On the eastern side of the reserve a dense callitris woodland exists Callitris rhomboidea (Port Jackson pine) under which grow extensive native pasture and an open shrubbery. The majority of the site consists of semi-disturbed woodland dominated by Corymbia gummifera (red bloodwoods); Angophora costata (Sydney red gum) and Eucalyptus haemastoma (scribbly gums).

The majority of the site is on a very slight slope with few exposed rock and deep sandy soils except for the northern edge where massive boulders of Sydney sandstone protrude from a more steep hillside which has acted to preserve a more diverse groundcover. The southern edge and the center of the site have all been re-vegetated by Bushcare to a near-natural state with a variety of species and other species from the surrounding bushland are re-colonising these areas. A total of nearly 150 species of native flora have been recorded in the reserve.

== Shrubs ==
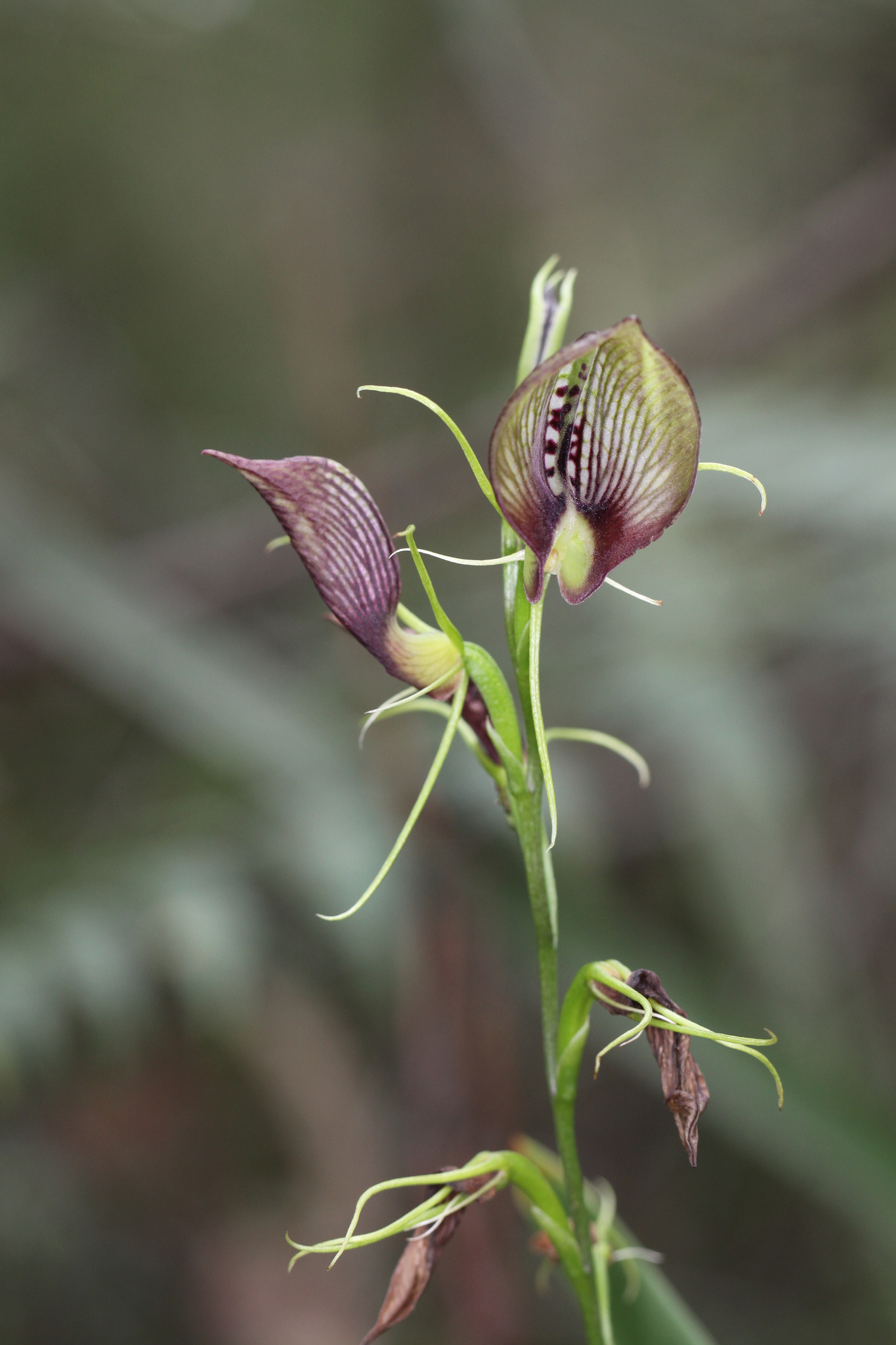
Cryptostylis erecta (Bonnet orchid)

Some common shrubs found in the reserve include: Hakea sericea (silky hakea); Hakea dactyloides (broad-leaved hakea); Grevillea sericea (waxflower); Philotheca scabra; Petrophile pulchella (conesticks); Acacia terminalis (sunshine Wattle); Acacia suaveolens (sweet scented wattle); Acacia linifolia (flax-leafed wattle); Xanthorrhoea arborea (trunkless grass tree); Angophora hispida (dwarf apple); Ozothamnus diosmifolius (riceflower); Banksia spinulosa (hairpin banksia); Persoonia laurina (laurel geebung); Persoonia levis (broad-leaved geebung); Dillwynia sieberi (native pea); Elaeocarpus reticulatus (blueberry ash); Glochidion ferdinandi (cheese tree) and Allocasuarina littoralis (black she-oaks).

Common understorey herbs include: Pomax umbellata; Platysace linearifolia; Hardenbergia violacea (purple twining pea); Smilax australis (native Sarsaparilla); Kennedia rubicunda (dusky coral pea); Dianella caerulea, Dianella revoluta (Blue Flax Lily); Lindsaea linearis (screw fern); Hibbertia riparia (Guinea flower); Gonocarpus teucrioides (raspwort); Zieria tridentata; Lomatia silaifolia (native parsley); Plectranthus parviflorus; Actinotus minor (lesser flannel flower) and Glycine clandestina.

Common grasses include: Micrloaena stipoides (weeping meadow grass); Entolasia sp. (native panic); Juncus usiatus; Echinopogon caespitosus (hedgehog grass); Aristida vagans; Cymbopogon refractus (barbed-wire grass); Dichelachne crinita and Themeda triandra (kangaroo grass).

Several species of tiny orchids grow in this reserve, their leaves are so tiny as to be mistaken for a piece of grass when not in flower and often die back to a tiny little bulb in hot weather. Orchid species recorded include: Theylmitra pauciflora; Cryptostylis erecta; Calochilus paludosus and Pterostylis sp.

== Birds ==
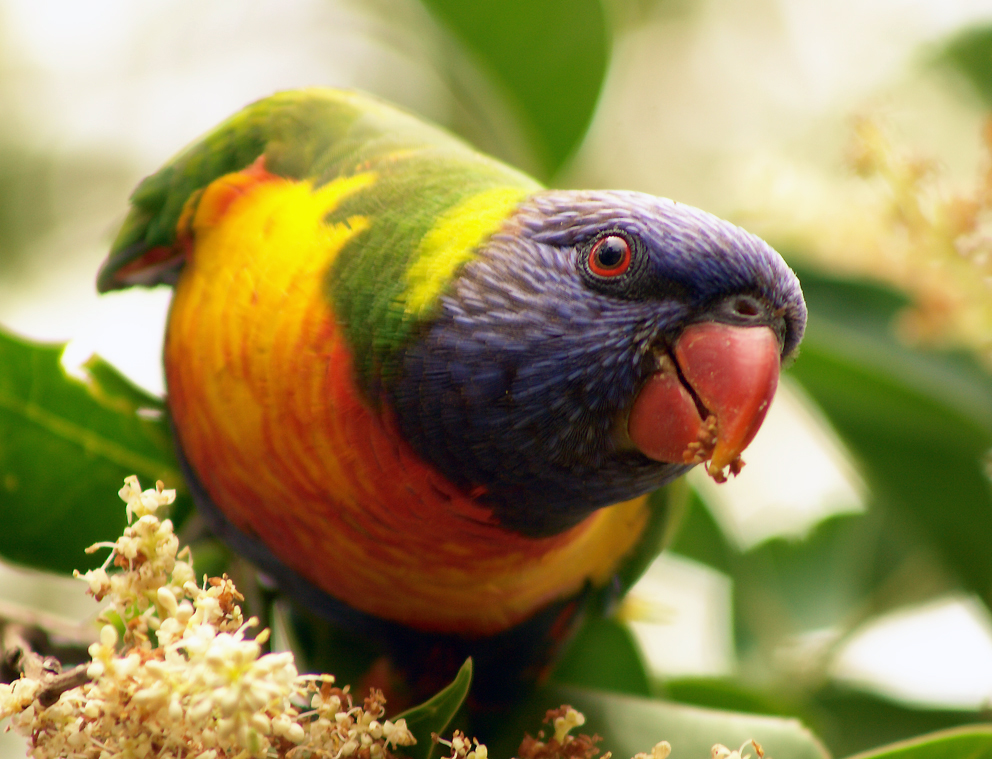
Trichoglossus moluccanus (Rainbow lorikeet)

Native birds that frequent or inhabit the reserve include the: Pied currawong; Australian magpie; Noisy miner; Laughing kookaburra; Pied butcherbird; Trichoglossus moluccanus (Rainbow lorikeet); Yellow-tailed black cockatoo; Sulphur-crested cockatoo; Magpie-lark; Koel; Tawny frogmouth; and Australian raven. Birds that once did use the site but are now recently extinct from this locality include the Superb fairy wren; Spotted pardalote and Silver-eye.

== Mammals ==
Native mammals that inhabit or visit Caravan Head Reserve are more or less limited to the: Pseudocheiridae (Ringtail possum); Brushtail possum, (a threatened species); Pteropus (grey-headed flying foxes, a threatened species); native rodents as wells as a variety of micro-bat species many of which are threatened with extinction.

== Weeds ==
Weed species found in reserve include: Erharta ercta (panic veldt grass); Paspalum grass, Ochna, Pittosporum undulatum (technically a native which is out of control due to changed conditions); Lantana camara; Blechnum nudum (Fishbone fern); Protoasparagus (Asparagus fern sp) and Paddys curse. Feral animals present in the reserve include the: Red fox; Domestic cat; Domestic dog and Common myna.
