= Hylaeus subcoronatus =

Scientific classification
- Kingdom: Animalia
- Phylum: Arthropoda
- Clade: Pancrustacea
- Class: Insecta
- Order: Hymenoptera
- Family: Colletidae
- Genus: Hylaeus
- Species: H. subcoronatus

Binomial name
- Hylaeus subcoronatus Rayment, 1935

Species of bee

Hylaeus subcoronatus, or Hylaeus (Prosopisteron) subcoronatus, is a species of bee in the family Colletidae and subfamily Hylaeinae. It is endemic to Australia. It was described by Australian entomologist Tarlton Rayment in 1935.

== Description ==
Body length of males and females is about 5.5 mm. Integumental colouration is mainly black, with yellow markings.

== Distribution and habitat ==
The species occurs in Victoria in south-eastern Australia. The type locality is Healesville. It has also been recorded from Beaumaris.

== Behaviour ==
The adults are flying mellivores. Flowering plants visited by the bees include Dianella revoluta and Corymbia calophylla.

Dianella revoluta (blue flax-lily), a forage plant of the bees

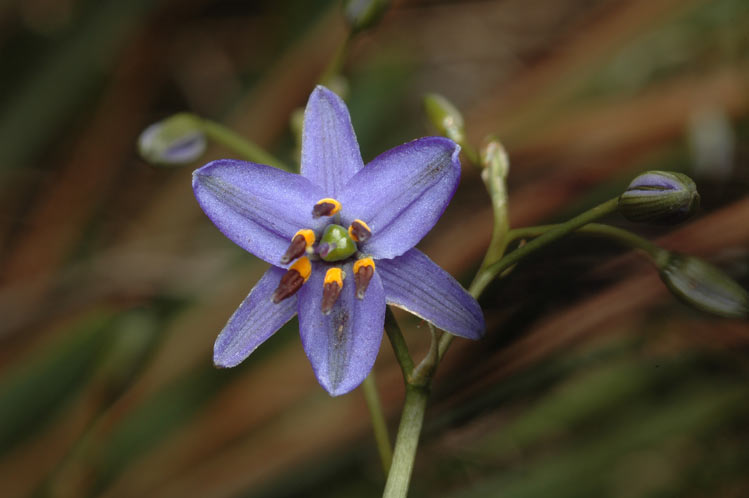
Dianella revoluta flower
