= The Block season 19 =

The Block
- Season 19
- No. of episodes: 51

Release
- Original network: Nine Network
- Original release: 6 August – 5 November 2023

Season chronology
- ← Previous; Season 18 Next → Season 20

The nineteenth season of Australian reality television series The Block premiered on 6 August 2023 on the Nine Network. Hosts Scott Cam and Shelley Craft, site foremen Keith Schleiger and Dan Reilly, and judges Shaynna Blaze and Darren Palmer, all returning from the previous season, with Marty Fox stepping in as partial guest judge for Neale Whitaker. Season 18 contestant Tom Calleja joins this season as the main Hipages plumber who will also judge each rooms for Best on Block.

== Production ==
Applications for the nineteenth season of the series opened in September 2022. In September 2022, it was reported Nine had bought five classic brick homes in Charming Street, Hampton East, Victoria, for an estimated amount of $14.3 million. Construction began on the houses in mid-March 2023, and a series promo with a 1950s theme was filmed on the street with the unconfirmed contestants in the same month. Filming is expected to be a 10- to 12-week shoot period from early March 2023. Filming of the series was completed in mid June 2023.

The Block auctions (or Block-tions) for the houses were held on Saturday, 4 November 2023, with the final episode of 2023 airing the next day on Channel Nine and 9Now at 7:00 pm (AEDT) on Sunday, 5 November 2023.

=== Series changes ===
For the first time in any season, the contestants were given the entire renovation schedule for the duration of the build on day 1.

== Contestants ==
This is the tenth season of The Block to have five couples.

House	Couple	Age	Location	Relationship	Occupations
1	Kyle & Leslie Cottone	36 & 34	Perth, WA	Married with children	Firefighter & Education Assistant
2	Leah & Ash Milton	31 & 38	Brisbane, QLD	Married with children	First Aid Trainer & Builder
3	Kristy & Brett Beames	Both 34	Adelaide, SA	Married	Project Manager & Safety Advisor
4	Steph & Gian Ottavio	Both 27	Sydney, NSW	Married	Architect & Start-Up Worker
5	Eliza & Liberty Paschke	37 & 34	Melbourne, VIC	Sisters	Personal Assistant & Producer

== Score history ==
Teams' progress summarised through the competition
	Teams				
	Kyle & Leslie	Leah & Ash	Kristy & Brett	Steph & Gian	Eliza & Liberty
Rooms	Scores				
Studio Bathroom	25	24½	21	20½	23
Studio Bedroom	23	21	21	24½	21½
Work from Home Space	26	22½	24	26½	22½
Downstairs Bathroom	26	28	27½	25	25
Living and Dining Room	20	29	25½	25½	27
Master Bedroom and WIR	21	23½	27½	29	22½
Kitchen and Laundry	25	23½	28½	22	30
Master Ensuite	22½	23½	28	21	28
Double Bedroom for Kids	24	28	27½	30	26½
Final Bathroom and Re-do Room	23½	27	18½	26	27½
Backyard and Pool/Spa Area	33	37½	28	38	27
Front Garden and Facade	32½	39	35	38½	34½

=== Weekly Room Expenditures ===
Week	Room(s)	Budget	Costs				
Week	Room(s)	Budget	Kyle & Leslie	Leah & Ash	Kristy & Brett	Steph & Gian	Eliza & Liberty
1	House Decider	$5,000	$4,925	$4,999	$4,867	$4,972	$4,904
1	Studio Bathroom	$250,000 divided	$29,592	$19,484	$17,541	$21,895	$26,022
2	Studio Bedroom	$250,000 divided	$26,365	$20,219	$17,647	$22,921	$19,357
3	Work from Home Space	$250,000 divided	$13,917	$37,586	$29,919	$22,381	$23,670
4	Downstairs Bathroom	$250,000 divided	$18,517	$25,389	$33,660	$24,686	$37,130
5	Living and Dining Room	$250,000 divided	$31,561	$38,210	$23,325	$31,739	$37,707
6	Master Bedroom and WIR	$250,000 divided	$32,794	$32,372	$42,826	$44,065	$23,953
7	Kitchen and Laundry	$250,000 divided	$33,740	$22,084	$29,878	$25,304	$23,669
8	Master Ensuite	$250,000 divided	$25,969	$26,014	$31,609	$31,753	$29,662
9	Double Bedroom for Kids	$250,000 divided	$16,734	$21,912	$14,890	$25,580	$13,217
10	Final Bathroom and Re-do Room	$250,000 divided	$23,898	$26,118	$28,603	$55,930	$28,665
11	Backyard and Pool/Spa Area	$250,000 divided	$41,800	$46,360	$40,649	$71,704	$55,893
12	Front Garden and Facade	$250,000 divided					
Total costs		$255,000	$294,887	$315,748	$310,547	$377,958	$318,945

=== Weekly Room Prize ===
Week	Room	Winning team	Prize
1	Studio Bathroom	Kyle & Leslie	$10,000 and a night away to Camelot with Scott Cam
2	Studio Bedroom	Steph & Gian	$10,000, a $20,000 Hermes handbag, a $20,000 Kinsman wardrobe upgrade and a night away with Scott Cam at the Balgownie Estate in Yarra Valley
3	Work from Home Space	Steph & Gian	$10,000 and a night away with Scott Cam to the Sorrento hotel
4	Downstairs Bathroom	Leah & Ash	$10,000 and a night away with Scott Cam to Kyneton Springs Motel
5	Living and Dining Room	Leah & Ash	$10,000, and extra $10,000 for scoring a 10 and a night away with Scott Cam to Hotel Bellinzona in Daylesford
6	Master Bedroom and WIR	Steph & Gian	$10,000, an extra $10,000 for scoring a 10 and a night away with Scott Cam to Crown Metropol Hotel and a trip to Phillip Island to test drive the new ford
7	Kitchen and Laundry	Eliza & Liberty	$10,000, an extra $10,000 for scoring a 10 and a night away with Scott Cam to Peninsula Hot Springs
8	Master Ensuite	Kristy & Brett	$10,000 each and a night away to Camelot with Scott Cam
8	Master Ensuite	Eliza & Liberty	$10,000 each and a night away to Camelot with Scott Cam
9	Double Bedroom for Kids	Steph & Gian	$10,000, an extra $30,000 for scoring 3 10's and a night away with Scott Cam to Lancemore
10	Final Bathroom and Re-do Room	Eliza & Liberty	$10,000 and a night away with Scott Cam to Langham hotel
11	Backyard and Pool/Spa Area	Steph & Gian	$10,000 and an extra $10,000 for scoring a 10
12	Front Garden and Facade	Leah & Ash	Ford Mustang Mach-E worth $80,000

== Results ==
=== Judges' Scores ===
Colour key:
Highest Score
Lowest Score

Summary of Judges' Scores
Week	Area(s)	Scores	Teams				
Week	Area(s)	Scores	Kyle & Leslie	Leah & Ash	Kristy & Brett	Steph & Gian	Eliza & Liberty
1	Studio Bathroom	Darren	8½	8½	7½	7	8
1	Studio Bathroom	Marty	8	7½	7	7	7½
1	Studio Bathroom	Shaynna	8½	8½	6½	6½	7½
1	Studio Bathroom	Total	25	24½	21	20½	23
2	Studio Bedroom	Darren	8	7½	7½	8	8
2	Studio Bedroom	Marty	7½	7	7	9	6½
2	Studio Bedroom	Shaynna	7½	6½	6½	7½	7½
2	Studio Bedroom	Total	23	21	21	24½	21½
3	Work from Home Space	Darren	9	7½	9	9	7½
3	Work from Home Space	Marty	8	7½	7½	8½	7½
3	Work from Home Space	Shaynna	9	7½	7½	9	7½
3	Work from Home Space	Total	26	22½	24	26½	22½
4	Downstairs Bathroom	Darren	9	9	9½	9	9½
4	Downstairs Bathroom	Marty	8	9	8½	7½	7½
4	Downstairs Bathroom	Shaynna	9	9	9½	8½	8
4	Downstairs Bathroom	Total	26	28	27½	25	25
5	Living and Dining Room	Darren	6½	9½	8½	8½	9
5	Living and Dining Room	Shaynna	6½	9½	8½	8	9
5	Living and Dining Room	Neale	7	10	8½	9	9
5	Living and Dining Room	Total	20	29	25½	25½	27
6	Master Bedroom and WIR	Darren	7	8	9½	9½	7½
6	Master Bedroom and WIR	Marty	7½	8	9	10	7½
6	Master Bedroom and WIR	Shaynna	6½	7½	9	9½	7½
6	Master Bedroom and WIR	Total	21	23½	27½	29	22½
7	Kitchen and Laundry	Darren	8½	8	9½	7½	9½
7	Kitchen and Laundry	Neale	8½	8	9½	7½	9½
7	Kitchen and Laundry	Shaynna	8	7½	9½	7	10
7	Kitchen and Laundry	Total	25	23½	28½	22	30
8	Master Ensuite	Darren	7½	8	9½	7½	9
8	Master Ensuite	Marty	7½	8	9	6½	9½
8	Master Ensuite	Shaynna	7½	7½	9½	7	9½
8	Master Ensuite	Total	22½	23½	28	21	28
9	Double Bedroom for Kids	Darren	8½	9½	9½	10	9
9	Double Bedroom for Kids	Marty	7½	9	8½	10	8
9	Double Bedroom for Kids	Shaynna	8	9½	9½	10	9½
9	Double Bedroom for Kids	Total	24	28	27½	30	26½
10	Final Bathroom and Re-do Room	Darren	7½	8½	6	8½	9½
10	Final Bathroom and Re-do Room	Neale	8	9½	6½	9	8½
10	Final Bathroom and Re-do Room	Shaynna	8	9	6	8½	9½
10	Final Bathroom and Re-do Room	Total	23½	27	18½	26	27½
11	Backyard and Pool/Spa Area	Dave	8½	9	6	9	7
11	Backyard and Pool/Spa Area	Darren	8	9½	7½	9½	7
11	Backyard and Pool/Spa Area	Marty	8½	9½	7	9½	6½
11	Backyard and Pool/Spa Area	Shaynna	8	9½	7½	10	6½
11	Backyard and Pool/Spa Area	Total	33	37½	28	38	27
12	Front Garden and Facade	Dave	8	9½	8½	9½	8
12	Front Garden and Facade	Darren	8½	9½	9	9½	9
12	Front Garden and Facade	Marty	8	9½	8½	9	8½
12	Front Garden and Facade	Shaynna	8	9½	9	9½	9
12	Front Garden and Facade	Total	32½	39	35	38½	34½

=== Challenge scores ===
Summary of challenge scores
Week	Challenge		Reward	Teams				
Week	Challenge	Description	Reward	Kyle & Leslie	Leah & Ash	Kristy & Brett	Steph & Gian	Eliza & Liberty
1	House decider	Each team is given $5,000 to create a Disney themed kids bedroom in 48 hours	First choice of the houses	17.5 (House 1)	27 (House 2)	18 (House 3)	14 (House 4)	18.5 (House 5)
2	BBQ Challenge	Each team is tasked to cook Scott Cam a perfect steak	$10,000 towards their house budget			win		
3	Plunge Challenge	Each team had to build a sand sculpture that was equally as impressive as the bonus point gnome	$5,000 cash and a bonus point gnome	Clown Fish	Sea Horse	Shark	Turtle	Octopus
4	Breakdancing Challenge	Blockheads will be facing off in the ultimate breakdancing battle	1st place $5,000 and a secret bonus point gnome, 2nd place $3,000 and 3rd place $2,000 cash	5th place	2nd place	4th place	3rd place	1st place
5	Surfing Challenge	The Blockheads take Eliza to URBNSURF for her birthday on a public holiday and Scott Cam makes it a challenge	$2000 to the Blockhead with the best wave and $500 to the most improved Blockhead			best wave		most improved surfer
5	Blacksmith Challenge	Blockheads have to make a sculpture out of metal that will be used in their Living or Dining spaces	$5,000 cash	Bottle Shape	Remote control holder/vase	Olympic Torch Cup	Candle Holder	Abstract Sculpture
6	Driving Challenge	Blockheads are to drive the obstacle course at the Ford ground in Lara in the fastest combined time	$10,000 and a bonus point gnome	6 minutes & 1 second	6 minutes & 43 seconds	6 minutes & 27 seconds	7 minutes & 22 seconds	8 minutes & 6 seconds
7	Team Challenge	The Blockheads have the task of renovating The Bayside Community Information and Support service	$10,000 for the winning team	Team 1	Team 2		Team 1	Team 2
8	Domain Buyers Jury	The Blockheads open their homes to 100 possible buyers and the buyers vote on whose house they like the most	$50,000 and a lunch with Shelly, Alice and Nicola at Grossi Florentino	2nd place (21 votes)	3rd place (11 votes each)		1st place (36 votes)	2nd place (21 votes)
9	Ronald McDonald Charity Challenge	The Blockheads have the task of renovating the backyard area of Ronald McDonald house	$15,000 for the winning team	Team 1	Team 2		Team 1	Team 2
9	Weber Challenge	Each team is tasked to cook Scott Cam a meal	$15,000 towards their house budget			win		
10	Ninja Warrior Challenge	Each team has to complete a wet parkour course in the fastest combined time	$10,000 for the fastest team				win	

== Auction ==
Auction results
Rank	Couple	Reserve	Auction Result	Amount sold for after Auction	Profit made	Total Profit	Auction Order
1	Steph & Gian	$3.35m	$5m	N/A	$1.65m	$1.75m	1st
2	Eliza & Liberty	$3.25m	$4.3m	N/A	$1.05m	$1.05m	2nd
3	Leah & Ash	$2.97m	Passed In	$3.125m	$155,000	$155,000	5th
4	Kyle & Leslie	$2.97m	$3.1m	N/A	$130,000	$130,000	4th
5	Kristy & Brett	$2.97m	$3.035m	N/A	$65,000	$65,000	3rd

== Ratings ==
The Block 2023 metropolitan viewership and nightly position Colour key: – Highest rating during the series – Lowest rating during the series
Week	Episode		Original airdate	Timeslot	Viewers (millions) (Note: Ratings data is from OzTAM and represents the live and same day average viewership from the 5 largest Australian metropolitan centres (Sydney, Melbourne, Brisbane, Perth and Adelaide).)	Nightly rank	Source
1	1	"House Decider Challenge"	6 August 2023	Sunday 7:00 pm	0.722	3	
1	2	"Studio Bathrooms Begin"	7 August 2023	Monday 7:30 pm	0.557	11	
1	3	"Studio Bathrooms Continue"	8 August 2023	Tuesday 7:30 pm	0.568	7	
1	4	"Bathroom Stress"	9 August 2023	Wednesday 7:30 pm	0.558	7	
2	5	"Studio Bathrooms Revealed"	13 August 2023	Sunday 7:00 pm	0.786	4	
2	6	"Studio Bedrooms Begin"	14 August 2023	Monday 7:30 pm	0.660	6	
2	7	"Studio Bedrooms Continue"	15 August 2023	Tuesday 7:30 pm	0.597	6	
2	8	"Perfect Steak Challenge"	16 August 2023	Wednesday 7:30 pm	0.175 (Note: Brisbane and Sydney only.)	<20	
2	8	"Perfect Steak Challenge"	17 August 2023	Thursday 7:30 pm	0.260 (Note: Melbourne, Perth and Adelaide only)	18	
3	9	"Studio Bedrooms Revealed"	20 August 2023	Sunday 7:00 pm	0.778	6	
3	10	"Work From Home Space Week Begin"	21 August 2023	Monday 7:30 pm	0.619	7	
3	11	"Plunge Challenge"	22 August 2023	Tuesday 7:30 pm	0.568	7	
3	12	"Work From Home Space Week Continue"	23 August 2023	Wednesday 7:30 pm	0.541	8	
4	13	"Work From Home Space Week Revealed"	27 August 2023	Sunday 7:00 pm	0.745	3	
4	14	"Bathroom/Powder Room Week Begin"	28 August 2023	Monday 7:30 pm	0.622	7	
4	15	"Bathroom/Powder Room Week Continue"	29 August 2023	Tuesday 7:30 pm	0.585	7	
4	16	"Breakdancing Challenge"	30 August 2023	Wednesday 7:30 pm	0.578	6	
5	17	"Bathroom/Powder Room Week Revealed"	3 September 2023	Sunday 7:00 pm	0.816	1	
5	18	"Living And Dining Room Week Begin"	4 September 2023	Monday 7:30 pm	0.651	6	
5	19	"Blacksmith Challenge"	5 September 2023	Tuesday 7:30 pm	0.597	6	
5	20	"Living And Dining Room Week Continue"	6 September 2023	Wednesday 7:30 pm	0.557	6	
6	21	"Living And Dining Room Week Revealed"	10 September 2023	Sunday 7:00 pm	0.812	3	
6	22	"Master Bedroom And WIR Week Begin"	11 September 2023	Monday 7:30 pm	0.557	8	
6	23	"Driving Challenge"	12 September 2023	Tuesday 7:30 pm	0.559	7	
6	24	"Master Bedroom And WIR Week Continue"	13 September 2023	Wednesday 7:30 pm	0.526	8	
7	25	"Master Bedroom And WIR Week Revealed"	17 September 2023	Sunday 7:00 pm	0.786	3	
7	26	"Kitchen And Lanudry Week Begin"	18 September 2023	Monday 7:30 pm	0.634	6	
7	27	"Kitchen And Lanudry Week Continue"	19 September 2023	Tuesday 7:30 pm	0.621	6	
7	28	"Kitchen And Laundry Week Continue"	20 September 2023	Wednesday 7:30 pm	0.555	7	
8	29	"Kitchen And Laundry Week Revealed"	24 September 2023	Sunday 7:00 pm	0.844	1	
8	30	"Master Ensuite Week Begin"	25 September 2023	Monday 7:30 pm	0.628	7	
8	31	"Master Ensuite Week Continue"	26 September 2023	Tuesday 7:30 pm	0.626	6	
8	32	"Master Ensuite Week Continue"	27 September 2023	Wednesday 7:30 pm	0.619	5	
9	33	"Master Ensuite Week Revealed"	2 October 2023	Monday 7:30 pm	0.716	5	
9	34	"Double Kids' Bedroom Week Begin"	3 October 2023	Tuesday 7:30 pm	0.692	6	
9	35	"Double Kids' Bedroom Week Continue"	4 October 2023	Wednesday 7:30 pm	0.589	6	
9	36	"Double Kids' Bedroom Week Continue"	5 October 2023	Thursday 7:30 pm	0.499	7	
10	37	"Double Kids' Bedroom Week Revealed"	9 October 2023	Monday 7:30 pm	0.757	3	
10	38	"Upstairs Bathroom And Re-do Room Week Begin"	10 October 2023	Tuesday 7:30 pm	0.657	5	
10	39	"Upstairs Bathroom And Re-do Room Week Continue"	11 October 2023	Wednesday 7:30 pm	0.574	7	
10	40	"Upstairs Bathroom And Re-do Room Week Continue"	12 October 2023	Thursday 7:30 pm	0.595	5	
11	41	"Upstairs Bathroom And Re-do Room Revealed"	15 October 2023	Sunday 7:00 pm	0.874	1	
11	42	"Backyard And Pool Week Begin"	16 October 2023	Monday 7:30 pm	0.677	5	
11	43	"Backyard And Pool Week Continue"	17 October 2023	Tuesday 7:30 pm	0.671	5	
11	44	"Backyard And Pool Week Continue"	18 October 2023	Wednesday 7:30 pm	0.663	3	
12	45	"Backyard And Pool Week Revealed"	22 October 2023	Sunday 7:00 pm	0.909	1	
12	46	"Front Garden and Facade Week Begin"	23 October 2023	Monday 7:30 pm	0.658	5	
12	47	"Front Garden and Facade Week Continue"	24 October 2023	Tuesday 7:30 pm	0.650	5	
12	48	"Front Garden and Facade Week Continue"	25 October 2023	Wednesday 7:30 pm	0.611	5	
13	49	"Front Garden and Facade Week Revealed"	29 October 2023	Sunday 7:00 pm	0.990	1	
13	50	"Open For Inspections"	30 October 2023	Monday 7:30 pm	0.651	6	
13	51	"Grand Final/ Auctions"	5 November 2023	Sunday 7:00 pm	1.274	2	
13	51	"Winner Announced"	5 November 2023	Sunday 7:00 pm	1.592	1	
