= National Australian Convention of Amateur Astronomers =

The National Australian Convention of Amateur Astronomers (NACAA) is a biennial national forum for amateur astronomy in Australia.

In 1966 two enthusiastic amateur astronomical groups, the James Cook Astronomers Club (now called the Sutherland Astronomical Society) and the Canberra Astronomical Society met in Katoomba to discuss holding an astronomy convention in Australia. The first national Australian astronomy convention was subsequently held over Easter in Canberra in 1967, jointly hosted by the James Cook Astronomers Club and the Pacific Astronomical Society (both Sydney-based organisations). Subsequent conventions were held in Port Macquarie (1968), Ballarat (1969), and Wollongong (1970). After four initial annual conventions, it was agreed to hold the event biennially.

The first convention using the title NACAA was held in Melbourne in 1972, hosted by the Astronomical Society of Victoria. The title was devised by John Perdrix by arranging pieces of cardboard, each with the letter of a suitable word, until an appropriate acronym was found. The pronunciation rhymes with "backer".

The choice of Easter as the date to hold the conventions has been problematical. In the early years, the four-day holiday provided sufficient time for attendees to travel the long distances involved, mostly by car or train. The convention usually began with a welcome reception on the Friday evening and ended on Monday morning with two days of technical sessions in between. Faster transport in later years lead to suggestions to move the event to a three-day holiday weekend instead. The absence of a common holiday weekend shared by all Australian states has prevented this from happening. Instead, the event has expanded in recent years to include additional workshops and symposia, and to encompass most of the four-day holiday.

An interesting aspect of NACAA is that for nearly forty years there was no national steering committee to co-ordinate the event. The organisation of each NACAA was left entirely to the hosting group or society. This arrangement worked surprisingly well for many years, due mainly to the dedication of a small number of regular attendees from the various amateur societies. However, it suffered from problems such as the financial capacity of the hosting society, the level of understanding of the requirements of hosting the event, etc.

A group of regular attendees decided at the 2006 NACAA, following slowly dwindling attendances over the preceding ten years, to create a body to ensure that the tradition of NACAA would continue. NACAA Inc was incorporated in December 2006, only a few months short of forty years after the first national convention. The new body consists of a Secretariat of seven members, assisted by a local organising and a programme committee.

To date, there have been 24 national astronomy conventions in Australia, as detailed below (from Perdix, 2004.)

| Year | City | Host(s) |
|---|---|---|
| 1967 | Canberra | James Cook Astronomers Club (now called the Sutherland Astronomical Society), Pacific Astronomical Society |
| 1968 | Port Macquarie | Port Macquarie Astronomical Association |
| 1969 | Ballarat | Ballaarat Astronomical Society |
| 1970 | Wollongong | Illawarra Astronomical Society |
| 1972 | Melbourne | Astronomical Society of Victoria |
| 1974 | Adelaide | Astronomical Society of South Australia |
| 1976 | Sydney | Astronomical Society of New South Wales |
| 1978 | Canberra | Canberra Astronomical Society |
| 1980 | Geelong | Astronomical Society of Geelong |
| 1982 | Brisbane | Astronomical Association of Queensland |
| 1984 | Perth | Astronomical Society of Western Australia |
| 1986 | Hobart | Astronomical Society of Tasmania |
| 1988 | Sydney | Astronomical Society of New South Wales, British Astronomical Association (NSW Branch), Sutherland Astronomical Society |
| 1990 | Frankston | Astronomical Society of Frankston (now called the Mornington Peninsula Astronomical Society), Astronomical Society of Victoria |
| 1992 | Adelaide | Astronomical Society of South Australia |
| 1994 | Canberra | Canberra Astronomical Society |
| 1996 | Brisbane | Astronomical Association of Queensland, Southern Astronomical Society, Brisbane Astronomical Society, Southeast Queensland Astronomical Society |
| 1998 | Sutherland | Sutherland Astronomical Society |
| 2000 | Perth | Astronomy WA |
| 2002 | Adelaide | Astronomical Society of South Australia |
| 2004 | Hobart | Astronomical Society of Tasmania |
| 2006 | Frankston | Mornington Peninsula Astronomical Society |
| 2008 | Penrith | DMR and NACAA Inc |
| 2010 | Canberra | Canberra Astronomical Society |
| 2012 | Brisbane | Astronomical Association of Queensland |
| 2014 | Melbourne | Astronomical Society of Victoria |
| 2016 | Sydney | Sutherland Astronomical Society |

The Astronomical Society of Australia has since 1973 presented the Berenice and Arthur Page Medal (known as the Berenice Page Medal until 2011) to recognise the contributions to astronomical science by Australian amateur astronomers. The Medal has been presented at the NACAA convention dinner since 1986. The recipients to date are:

| Year | Recipient | For |
|---|---|---|
| 1973 | Mr Sid Elwin | Photometric observations of the occultation of Beta' Scorpii by Jupiter |
| 1975 | Mr Dave Herald | Observations of Baily Beads in the solar eclipse of 20 June 1974 |
| 1981 | Mr Bill Bradfield | The discovery, up to that time, of 11 comets |
| 1983 | Mr Byron Soulsby | Work on the oblateness of the umbral shadow |
| 1986 | Rev'd Robert Evans | Visual discoveries of supernovae |
| 1988 | Mr Robert McNaught | Photographic nova and supernova observations and discoveries |
| 1990 | Mr Barry Adcock | Telescope design work and planetary observations |
| 1992 | Dr Mal Wilkinson | The design and construction of a radio-telescope and subsequent observations of the Io-Jupiter system and for his development of a model for the emissions |
| 1994 | Mr Paul Camilleri | Discoveries of novae and Mira variables and the development of simple photographic techniques for nova searches |
| 1996 | Mr Peter Williams | Extensive on-going visual observations of variable stars, especially the R Coronae Borealis variables |
| 1998 | Mr Gordon Garradd | Significant contributions in the observation of asteroids, comets, novae and supernovae |
| 2000 | Mr Andrew Pearce | High quality visual observations of comets, variable stars and novae |
| 2002 | The Reynolds Amateur Photometry Team | Work in association with professional astronomers to provide data on objects such as supernovae, blazars and gamma ray bursts, using the Reynolds 30" telescope at Mount Stromlo Observatory |
| 2004 | Mr Colin Bembrick | Significant contributions to astronomy from photometric observations of minor planets |
| 2006 | Dr Tom Richards | Broad ranging CCD photometry lightcurve observations, particularly of minor planets, variable stars and exoplanet searches |
| 2008 | Mr John Broughton | Systematic survey for southern declination Near Earth Objects, and numerous occultation timings |
| 2010 | Mr David Gault | Significant observations of Pluto occultations |
| 2012 | Mr Anthony Wesley | High quality observations of the Jovian and Saturnian atmospheres and the discovery of an impact cloud and atmospheric flash on Jupiter. |
| 2014 | Tim Napier-Munn | Modelling the factors that affect the resolving of double stars by visual observers. |

As well, the Astral Award, originally sponsored by John Perdrix's Astral Press, has been presented for the best presentation at the convention. The recipients of the Astral Award to date are:

| Year | Recipient | Title of paper |
|---|---|---|
| 1986 | Tom Cragg | CV Aquarii |
| 1988 | Peter Jones | Computer star maps |
| 1990 | Peter Nelson, JL Blanksby, and AW Kruijshoop | Recent planetary and lunar occultations by the Occultation Section of the ASV |
| 1992 | Peter Nelson and Jim Park | Observing mutual phenomena of Jupiter's moons 1991 |
| 1994 | Fraser Farrell | The recruitment and supervision of amateur variable star observers |
| 1996 | Zac Pujic | The Cookbook CB245 CCD camera: evaluation of performance |
| 1998 | Vello Tabur | Computer-aided comet hunting |
| 2000 | Stephen Russell | Chasing shadows: photographing solar eclipses |
| 2002 | Colin Bembrick | Minor planet light curve determination |
| 2004 | Tom Richards | Amateurs getting violent: black holes, synchrotrons and magnetic flares |
| 2006 | Jeff Byron | Itokawa, YORP and the Cecil Sayers Observatory |
| 2008 | Surjit Wadhwa | Light Curve Analysis of Contact Binary Stars |
| 2010 | David O'Driscoll | Robotic Research for the Amateur Astronomer |
| 2012 | Tony Dutton, Greg Bond and Julian West | Spectrography and Variable Star Research |
| 2014 | Saeed Salimpour | The exciting life of Captain Henry Evans Baker |

== See also ==
- List of astronomical societies
