= Caravan Head =

Coordinates: 33.99724°S 151.08772°E

Caravan Head is a locality in Sutherland Shire, southern Sydney, in the state of New South Wales, Australia. It is located in the north-eastern part of the suburb of Oyster Bay. It is situated on the southern bank of the Georges River.
