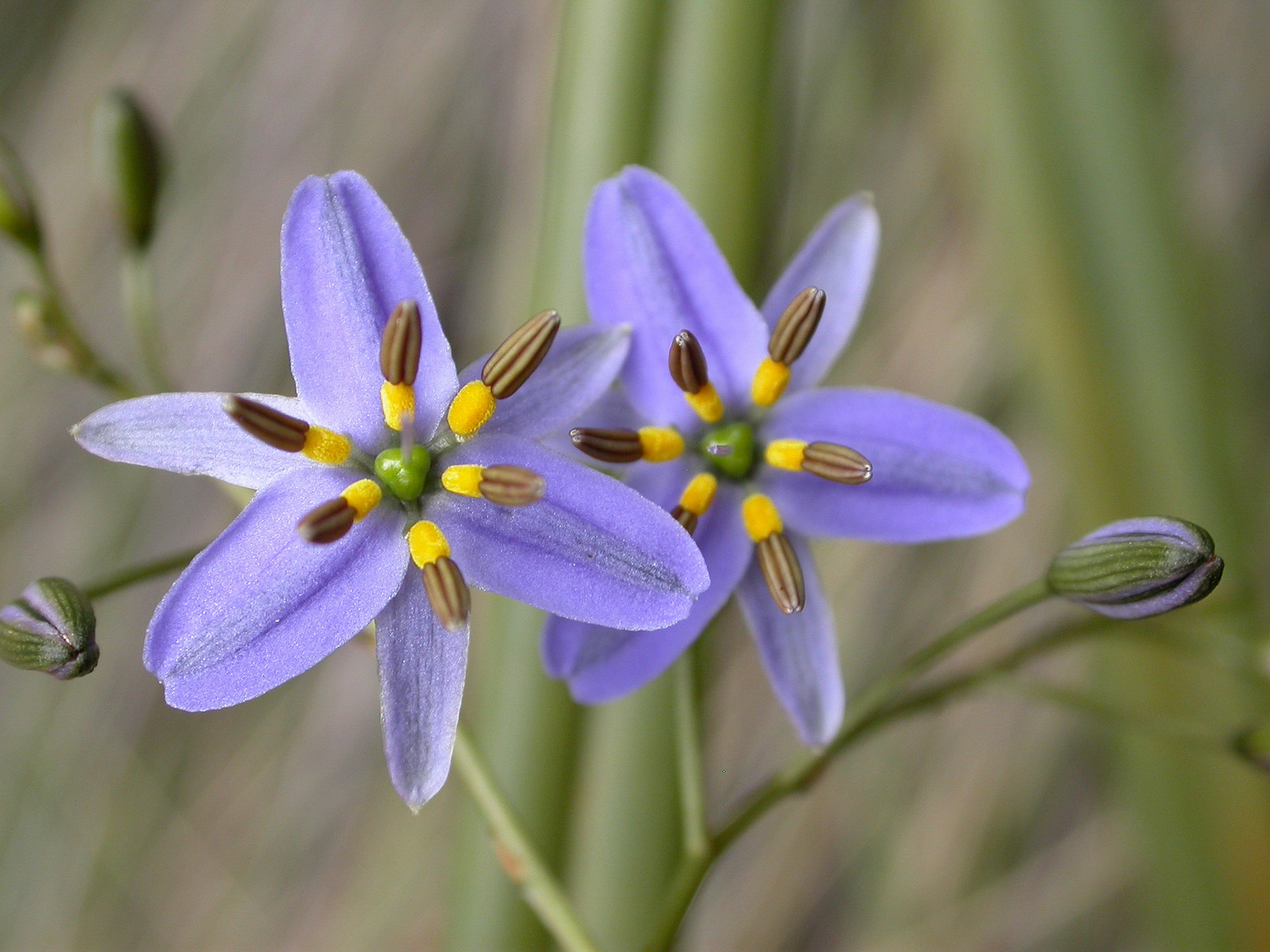

Scientific classification
- Kingdom: Plantae
- Clade: Embryophytes
- Clade: Tracheophytes
- Clade: Spermatophytes
- Clade: Angiosperms
- Clade: Monocots
- Order: Asparagales
- Family: Asphodelaceae
- Subfamily: Hemerocallidoideae
- Genus: Dianella
- Species: D. admixta

Binomial name
- Dianella admixta Gand.

= Dianella admixta =

Species of flowering plant

Dianella admixta, also known as the Black-anther lily or Spreading flax-lily or Black-anther flax lily, is a species of Dianella native to South-eastern Australia. It was once considered to be a subspecies or variety of Dianella revoluta.

D. admixta is a dense tufted perennial that typically grows to a height of 0.3 to 0.8 m (1 ft 0 in to 2 ft 7 in) and a width of 0.5 to 1.5 m (1 ft 8 in to 4 ft 11 in) and spreads by underground stems. It produces small blue flowers that bloom from August to May. It's berries and seeds are considered edible.
