= The Block season 18 =

The Block
- Season 18
- No. of episodes: 51

Release
- Original network: Nine Network
- Original release: 7 August – 6 November 2022

Season chronology
- ← Previous; Season 17 Next → Season 19

The eighteenth season of Australian reality television series The Block, titled The Block: Tree Change, premiered on 7 August 2022 on the Nine Network. Hosts Scott Cam and Shelley Craft, site foremen Keith Schleiger and Dan Reilly, and judges Neale Whitaker, Shaynna Blaze and Darren Palmer, all returned from the previous season.

== Production ==
Applications for the eighteenth season of the series opened in September 2021 until 18 October 2021, looking for couples aged between 18 and 65 years old being sought by casting agents. Filming is expected to be a 10–12 week shoot period from late February 2022. In September 2021, the eighteenth season of The Block was officially confirmed at Nine's 2022 upfronts, and for the first time the series will be heading to a regional location, the Macedon Ranges, where the contestants will be transforming country houses.

The Block in 2022 was located on McGeorge Road, in Gisborne, Victoria.

In early April 2022, the day filming was scheduled to commence it was confirmed by sources that a contestant had tested positive to COVID-19. Filming was delayed by a week with filming commencing mid-April.

The Block auctions (or Block-tions) for the houses were held on Saturday, 5 November 2022, with the final episode of 2022 airing the next day on Channel Nine and 9Now at 7:00pm (AEDT) on Sunday, 6 November 2022.

== Contestants ==
This is the ninth season of The Block to have five couples.

House	Couple	Age	Location	Relationship	Occupations
1	Tom Calleja & Sarah-Jane Wilson	34 & 30	Gladstone Park, VIC	Married with a child	Plumber & Social Worker
2	Rachel & Ryan Carr	Both 36	Oyster Bay, NSW	Married with children	Makeup Artist & Plumber
3	Ankur Dogra & Sharon Johal	41 & 35	Melbourne, VIC	Married	Accountant & Actress
4	Dylan Adams & Jenny Heath	28 & 25	Palm Beach, QLD	Engaged	Builder & Apprentice Chippy
5	Omar Slaimankhel & Ozman ‘Oz’ Abu Malik	Both 30	Western Sydney, NSW	Best Mates	Former NRL player & Building Maintenance Manager

=== Team controversy ===
Originally in the first 48 hours of the series, there was another team, Joel Patfull & Elle Ferguson, however they left the series abruptly in the first night without notice as they found the series was not “on brand” for them, therefore the team were replaced by Rachel & Ryan. Elle posted on Instagram that reason they left was because of Joel's mother having a bad fall, but the real reason was exposed on the show. Joel and Elle were portrayed as runaways and troublemakers who put in no effort on the show, and they were generally disliked by the public.

== Score history ==
Teams' progress summarised through the competition
	Teams				
	Tom & Sarah-Jane	Rachel & Ryan	Ankur & Sharon	Dylan & Jenny	Omar & Oz
Rooms	Scores				
Main Bathroom	25½	23½	20½	25½	26
Guest Bedroom	23½	24½	27	26½	23½
Master Ensuite	26	23½	27	23½	27½
Master Bedroom & Walk-in-Robe	28½	27½	28	25½	22½
Guest Bedroom & Bathroom	30	26	22	24½	29
Kitchen	30	24	24½	28½	28½
Living & Dining Room	25½	29½	19	22½	25½
Hallway, Laundry & Breezeway	26½	25	23	27	20½
Kids Bedroom	27½	28½	26½	29	21
Guest Bedroom & Re-do room	28	28	23½	27½	25
Working from home space	26	24½	19½	22½	24
Landscaping	30	26½	19½	26½	28½
Super Power Leader Board	297	284½	260½	282	273

=== Weekly Room Budget ===
Week	Room(s)	Budget	Costs				
Week	Room(s)	Budget	Tom & Sarah-Jane	Rachel & Ryan	Ankur & Sharon	Dylan & Jenny	Omar & Oz
1	House Decider	$5,000	$4,892	$4,247	$4,640	$4,907	$4,660
1	Main Bathroom	$22,000	$22,722	$33,211	$29,693	$28,003	$20,599
2	Guest Bedroom	$19,000	$8,854	$14,926	$13,403	$12,145	$10,681
3	Master Ensuite	$22,000	$19,057	$27,165	$32,916	$24,350	$25,873
4	Master Bedroom & Walk-in-Robe	$21,000	$21,992	$21,235	$37,213	$30,358	$20,048
5	Guest Bedroom & Bathroom	$30,000	$26,613	$30,124	$36,855	$26,459	$38,319
6	Kitchen	$21,000	$31,956	$20,358	$25,362	$24,322	$30,492
7	Living & Dining Room	$23,000	$61,844	$37,898	$60,459	$36,614	$55,611
8	Hallway, Laundry & Breezeway	$25,000	$56,804	$53,519	$60,014	$36,279	$73,814
9	Kids Bedroom	$15,000	$12,884	$10,160	$14,826	$6,085	$14,344
10	Guest Bedroom & Re-do room	$13,000+ $5,000	$12,589	$11,675	$12,187	$19,062	$27,426
11	Working From Home Space	$25,000	$23,209	$24,140	$15,104	$24,207	$23,798
12	Landscaping	$90,000					
Total costs		$336,000	$303,416	$288,658	$342,672	$272,791	$345,665

=== Weekly Room Prize ===
Week	Room	Winning team	Prize
1	Main Bathroom	Omar & Oz	$10,000, a $250,000 kitchen upgrade & a mature to plant in their garden
2	Guest Bedroom	Ankur & Sharon	$10,000 & a mature tree to plant in their garden
3	Master Ensuite	Omar & Oz	$10,000 and a mature tree to plant in their garden
4	Master Bedroom & Walk-in-Robe	Tom & Sarah-Jane	$10,000, an extra $5,000 for scoring a 10, a walk-in wine cellar and a mature tree to plant in their garden
5	Guest Bedroom & Bathroom	Tom & Sarah-Jane	$10,000, an extra $5,000 for scoring a 10 and a mature tree to plant in their garden
6	Kitchen	Tom & Sarah-Jane	$10,000, an extra $15,000 for scoring three 10's and a mature tree to plant in their garden
7	Living & Dining Room	Rachel & Ryan	$10,000, an extra $10,000 for scoring two 10's and a mature tree to plant in their garden.
8	Hallway, Laundry & Breezeway	Dylan & Jenny	$10,000 and a mature tree to plant in their garden
9	Kids Bedroom	Dylan & Jenny	$10,000, an extra $5,000 for scoring a 10 and a mature tree to plant in their garden
10	Guest Bedroom & Re-do room	Tom & Sarah-Jane	$10,000 split ($5,000 each) and the mature tree prize was won by Tom during a coin toss
10	Guest Bedroom & Re-do room	Rachel & Ryan	$10,000 split ($5,000 each) and the mature tree prize was won by Tom during a coin toss
11	Working From Home Space	Tom & Sarah-Jane	$10,000 and a mature tree to plant in their garden
12	Landscaping	Tom & Sarah-Jane	$5,000 and a Next Generation Ford Ranger

== Results ==
=== Judges' Scores ===
Colour key:
Highest Score
Lowest Score

Summary of Judges' Scores
Week	Area(s)	Scores	Teams				
Week	Area(s)	Scores	Tom & Sarah-Jane	Rachel & Ryan	Ankur & Sharon	Dylan & Jenny	Omar & Oz
1	Main Bathroom	Darren	8½	8½	7½	9	9
1	Main Bathroom	Shaynna	8½	8	6½	8½	8
1	Main Bathroom	Neale	8½	7	6½	8	9
1	Main Bathroom	Total	25½	23½	20½	25½	26
2	Guest Bedroom	Darren	8	8½	9	9	8
2	Guest Bedroom	Shaynna	7½	8	8½	9	7½
2	Guest Bedroom	Neale	8	8	8½	8½	8
2	Guest Bedroom	Total	23½	24½	27	26½	23½
3	Master Ensuite	Darren	9	9	9	8	9
3	Master Ensuite	Shaynna	8½	7½	8½	7½	9
3	Master Ensuite	Neale	8½	7	9½	8	9½
3	Master Ensuite	Total	26	23½	27	23½	27½
4	Master Bedroom & Walk-in-Robe	Darren	9	9½	9	8½	7½
4	Master Bedroom & Walk-in-Robe	Shaynna	9½	9	9½	8½	7½
4	Master Bedroom & Walk-in-Robe	Neale	10	9	9½	8½	7½
4	Master Bedroom & Walk-in-Robe	Total	28½	27½	28	25½	22½
5	Guest Bedroom & Bathroom	Darren	9½	9	7½	8½	9½
5	Guest Bedroom & Bathroom	Shaynna	9½	8½	7½	8	9½
5	Guest Bedroom & Bathroom	Neale	10	8½	7	8	10
5	Guest Bedroom & Bathroom	Total	30	26	22	24½	29
6	Kitchen	Darren	10	8	8	9½	9½
6	Kitchen	Shaynna	10	8	8	9½	9½
6	Kitchen	Neale	10	8	8½	9½	9½
6	Kitchen	Total	30	24	24½	28½	28½
7	Living & Dining Room	Darren	8½	9½	6	7½	9½
7	Living & Dining Room	Shaynna	8	10	6	7	9½
7	Living & Dining Room	Neale	9	10	7	7½	9½
7	Living & Dining Room	Total	25½	29½	19	22	25½
8	Hallway, Laundry & Breezeway	Darren	8½	8½	8	8½	7½
8	Hallway, Laundry & Breezeway	Shaynna	9	8½	7	9	6½
8	Hallway, Laundry & Breezeway	Neale	9	8	8	9½	6½
8	Hallway, Laundry & Breezeway	Total	26½	25	23	27	20½
9	Kids Bedroom	Darren	9	9½	9	9½	7
9	Kids Bedroom	Shaynna	9½	9½	8½	9½	7
9	Kids Bedroom	Neale	9	9½	9	10	7
9	Kids Bedroom	Total	27½	28½	26½	29	21
10	Guest Bedroom & Re-do room	Darren	9½	9½	8	9	9
10	Guest Bedroom & Re-do room	Shaynna	9½	9½	8	9	8
10	Guest Bedroom & Re-do room	Neale	9	9	7½	9½	8
10	Guest Bedroom & Re-do room	Total	28	28	23½	27½	25
11	Working from home space	Alisa	8½	8	6½	7½	8
11	Working from home space	Lysandra	8½	8	6½	7½	8
11	Working from home space	Darren	9	8½	6½	7½	8
11	Working from home space	Total	26	24½	19½	22½	24
12	Landscaping	Darren	9½	9	6½	9	9½
12	Landscaping	Shaynna	9½	9	6½	9	9½
12	Landscaping	Neale	10	8½	6½	8½	9½
12	Landscaping	Total	30	26½	19½	26½	28½

=== Challenge scores ===
Summary of challenge scores
Week	Challenge		Reward	Teams				
Week	Challenge	Description	Reward	Tom & Sarah-Jane	Rachel & Ryan	Ankur & Sharon	Dylan & Jenny	Omar & Oz
1	House decider	Makeover a bedroom in 48 hours with a budget of $5,000	First choice of the houses	1st (House 1)	N/A (House 2)	3rd (House 3)	2nd (House 4)	5th (House 5)
2	Nosey Neighbour challenge	A quiz on country housing	$5,000 and 1 bonus point	-	-	1st	-	-
3	Letterbox challenge	$500 to build the best postbox that will be installed at the front of their houses.	$10,000 & a night away	1st	-	-	-	-
4	Grape Escape Challenge	Stage 1: Grape Crushing; Stage 2: Wine Blending; Stage 3: Label Design	Prize 1: $10,000; Prize 2 & 3: $50,000 of Wine Prize	Prize 1	Prize 3	Prize 2	-	-
5	Topiary Challenge	Clipping a shrub into a shape	$10,000 and 1 bonus point	1st	-	-	-	-
6	Antique Evaluation Challenge	$100 to buy an antique item for their kitchen and reevaluate it for the highest price	$12,000 fireplace from Schots plus $1,000	Copper Jug; Bought for: $35 revaluation: $85	Collectible Spoons; Bought for: $90 revaluation: $90	Mirror; Bought for: $100 revaluation: $250	Teapot; Bought for: $50 revaluation: $80	Gold-plated Tea Cup; Bought for: $30 revaluation: $70
6 & 7	Team Challenge	The Blockheads have the task of renovating Tim and Tyler's house over two weeks	$10,000	winners				
8	Driving Challenge	Each contestant will have to back their trailer from the first checkpoint into the second, then drive to the third checkpoint and reverse the whole way back	The team combined who has the fastest score get $10,000	-	-	-	-	fastest combined time
9	Sculpture Challenge	Make a sculpture out of clay incorporating some automotive design aspects	A fully loaded blue Ford Everest worth $80,000	Can you handle it	The Side Window	The Vase	The Console	The Headlight
10	Domain Property Challenge	Clean and style their houses for domain buyers jury and photoshoot	$10,000 and 1 bonus point	26 votes Danny Willis award the gnome	27 votes	12 votes	16 votes	19 votes
11	Cleaning Challenge	Clean a hotel suite each for their families to stay in	$10,000	-	Win	-	-	-
12	Simmons Home Defects Challenge	Blue tape Nate is back and he's giving $5,000 to the team that's done the best job at fixing all their defects.	$5,000	-	Win	-	-	-

== Auction ==
Auction results
Rank	Couple	Reserve	Auction Result	Amount sold for after Auction	Profit made	Total Profit	Auction Order
1	Omar & Oz	$4,080,000	$5,666,666.66	N/A	$1,586,666.66	$1,686,666.66	1st
2	Ankur & Sharon	$4,080,000	Passed in	$4,250,000	$170,000	$170,000	4th
3	Rachel & Ryan	$4,080,000	Passed in	$4,249,000.50	$169,000.50	$169,000.50	3rd
4	Tom & Sarah-Jane	$4,080,000	$4,100,000.99	N/A	$20,000.99	$20,000.99	2nd
5	Dylan & Jenny	$4,080,000	Passed in	$3,900,000	$0	$0	5th

The Auctions were held on Saturday November 5, 2022, with the episode being aired the following night. Omar & Oz broke the record for the highest amount of profit ever made in a Block auction, taking home a total profit of $1,686,666.66, which equates to $843,333 each. Meanwhile, the other auctions did not fare so well. High interest rates and inflation lead to the lowest result since 2011, with favourites Tom & Sarah-Jane taking home just $20,000.99. Rachel & Ryan passed in their home and it sold immediately after for $4,249,000.50, netting them a profit of $169,000.50. Ankur & Sharon and Dylan & Jenny followed Rachel & Ryan's strategy by passing in their homes in hope for a better result down the track. On 11 November, Ankur & Sharon's house sold for $4.25 million giving them a profit of $170,000. On 13 February, Dylan and Jenny's house was sold for an undisclosed amount more than 3 months after auction. In May 2023, it was revealed their house had sold for $3.9 million, $180,000 under reserve, meaning they did not make any profit.

== Ratings ==
The Block 2022 metropolitan viewership and nightly position Colour key: – Highest rating during the series – Lowest rating during the series
Week	Episode		Original airdate	Timeslot	Viewers (millions) (Note: Ratings data is from OzTAM and represents the live and same day average viewership from the 5 largest Australian metropolitan centres (Sydney, Melbourne, Brisbane, Perth and Adelaide).)	Nightly rank	Source
1	1	"Welcome to The Block/House Decider"	7 August 2022	Sunday 7:00pm	0.867	2	
1	2	"Main Bathrooms Begin"	8 August 2022	Monday 7:30pm	0.835	5	
1	3	"Main Bathrooms Continue"	9 August 2022	Tuesday 7:30pm	0.775	5	
1	4	"Bathroom Pressure"	10 August 2022	Wednesday 7:30pm	0.749	5	
2	5	"Main Bathrooms Revealed"	14 August 2022	Sunday 7:00pm	0.984	1	
2	6	"Guest Bedrooms Begin"	15 August 2022	Monday 7:30pm	0.805	5	
2	7	"Nosey Neighbour Challenge"	16 August 2022	Tuesday 7:30pm	0.749	5	
2	8	"Guest Bedrooms Continue"	17 August 2022	Wednesday 7:30pm	0.757	5	
3	9	"Guest Bedrooms Revealed"	21 August 2022	Sunday 7:00pm	0.911	2	
3	10	"Master Ensuites Begin"	22 August 2022	Monday 7:30pm	0.744	5	
3	11	"Letterbox Challenge"	23 August 2022	Tuesday 7:30pm	0.723	5	
3	12	"Master Ensuites Continue"	24 August 2022	Wednesday 7:30pm	0.665	6	
4	13	"Master Ensuites Revealed"	28 August 2022	Sunday 7:00pm	0.981	1	
4	14	"Master Bedrooms & WIRs Begin"	29 August 2022	Monday 7:30pm	0.789	5	
4	15	"Wine Making Challenge"	30 August 2022	Tuesday 7:30pm	0.777	5	
4	16	"Master Bedrooms & WIRs Continue"	31 August 2022	Wednesday 7:30pm	0.744	5	
5	17	"Master Bedroom & WIRs Revealed"	4 September 2022	Sunday 7:00pm	0.922	1	
5	18	"Guest Bedroom & Bathrooms Begin"	5 September 2022	Monday 7:30pm	0.740	5	
5	19	"Topiary Challenge"	6 September 2022	Tuesday 7:30pm	0.708	5	
5	20	"Guest Bedroom & Bathrooms Continue"	7 September 2022	Wednesday 7:30pm	0.796	3	
6	21	"Guest Bedroom & Bathrooms Revealed"	11 September 2022	Sunday 7:00pm	0.983	2	
6	22	"Kitchens Begin & Special Challenge"	12 September 2022	Monday 7:30pm	0.719	5	
6	23	"Houses Shut Down"	13 September 2022	Tuesday 7:30pm	0.715	5	
6	24	"Kitchens Continue"	14 September 2022	Wednesday 7:30pm	0.772	4	
7	25	"Kitchens Revealed"	18 September 2022	Sunday 7:00pm	0.948	2	
7	26	"Living & Dining Begins"	20 September 2022	Tuesday 7:30pm	0.706	5	
7	27	"Special Challenge Ends"	21 September 2022	Wednesday 7:30pm	0.685	5	
7	28	"Living & Dining Continues"	22 September 2022	Thursday 7:30pm	0.638	5	
8	29	"Living & Dining Revealed"	25 September 2022	Sunday 7:00pm	1.040	1	
8	30	"Hallway, Laundry & Breezeway Begins"	26 September 2022	Monday 7:30pm	0.773	5	
8	31	"Driving Challenge"	27 September 2022	Tuesday 7:30pm	0.752	5	
8	32	"Hallway, Laundry & Breezeway Continues"	28 September 2022	Wednesday 7:30pm	0.703	5	
9	33	"Hallway, Laundry & Breezeway Revealed"	3 October 2022	Monday 7:30pm	0.884	3	
9	34	"Kids Bedroom Begins"	4 October 2022	Tuesday 7:30pm	0.747	5	
9	35	"Kids Bedroom Continues"	5 October 2022	Wednesday 7:30pm	0.750	5	
9	36	"Sculpture Challenge"	6 October 2022	Thursday 7:30pm	0.670	5	
10	37	"Kids Bedroom Revealed"	9 October 2022	Sunday 7:00pm	0.904	3	
10	38	"Guest Bedroom & Re-do room Begins"	10 October 2022	Monday 7:30pm	0.756	5	
10	39	"Guest Bedroom & Re-do room Continues"	11 October 2022	Tuesday 7:30pm	0.681	5	
10	40	"Domain Challenge"	12 October 2022	Wednesday 7:30pm	0.752	3	
11	41	"Guest Bedroom & Re-do room Reveal"	16 October 2022	Sunday 7:00pm	0.970	1	
11	42	"Working from home space Begins"	17 October 2022	Monday 7:30pm	0.790	3	
11	43	"Cleaning Challenge"	18 October 2022	Tuesday 7:30pm	0.735	3	
11	44	"Working from home space"	19 October 2022	Wednesday 7:30pm	0.726	3	
12	45	"Working from home space Reveal"	23 October 2022	Sunday 7:00pm	1.005	1	
12	46	"Landscaping Begins"	24 October 2022	Monday 7:30pm	0.849	3	
12	47	"Landscaping Continues"	25 October 2022	Tuesday 7:30pm	0.782	3	
12	48	"Landscaping Continues"	26 October 2022	Wednesday 7:30pm	0.763	3	
13	49	"The final stretch"	30 October 2022	Sunday 7:00pm	0.975	1	
13	50	"Landscaping Reveal"	31 October 2022	Monday 7:30pm	0.903	3	
13	51	"Grand Final/ Auctions"	6 November 2022	Sunday 7:00pm	1.384	2	
13	51	"Winner Announced"	6 November 2022	Sunday 7:00pm	1.692	1	

== Death ==
One of the workers, Jon-Jeremy Bradey, died in October 2022. He suffered a heart attack and he was 42.
