= Oyster Bay, New South Wales =

Oyster Bay
- Suburb
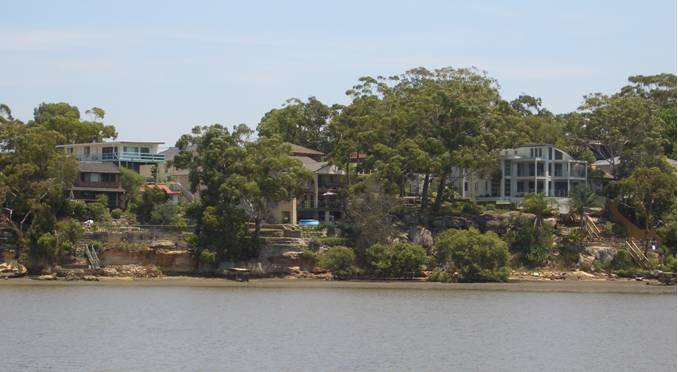
- Oyster Bay

- Interactive map of Oyster Bay
- Country: Australia
- State: New South Wales
- City: Sydney
- LGA: Sutherland Shire
- Location: 26 km (16 mi) south of Sydney CBD
- Established: 1933

Government
  - State electorate: Miranda
  - Federal division: Cook
- Elevation: 15 m (49 ft)

Population
  - Total: 5,689 (2021 census)
- Postcode: 2225
Suburbs around Oyster Bay
Oatley	Connells Point	Kangaroo Point
Como	Oyster Bay	Sylvania
Jannali	Gymea	Kareela

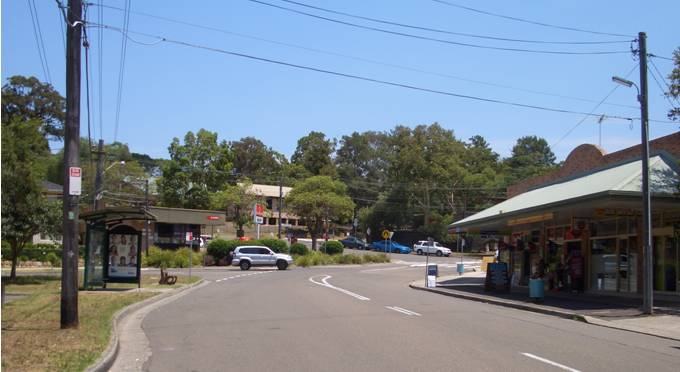
Oyster Bay Road and Como Road intersection

Oyster Bay is a suburb in Southern Sydney, in the state of New South Wales, Australia. It is located 26 kilometres south of the Sydney central business district in the local government area of the Sutherland Shire.

== Location ==
Oyster Bay is a natural feature on the southern bank of the Georges River.

Green Point and Caravan Head are localities within the suburb of Oyster Bay. Green Point is home to the Green Point Observatory, home of the Sutherland Astronomical Society. Coronation Bay is also located on the Georges River between Green Point and Caravan Head. At Coronation Bay there is a large mangrove area that creates a diverse and dynamic eco-system, which supports a variety of bird-life. Carina Bay is located on the western boundary of the suburb.

== History ==
Oyster Bay takes its name from the abundance of oysters that were found in the bay. The name had appeared on maps prepared by Surveyor Wells in 1840. Oyster Bay was part of the Thomas Holt Estate of 12,000 acres purchased in 1861 by Thomas Holt (1811-1888), pastoralist and at one time, Colonial Treasurer of New South Wales. His estate covered most of present-day Sutherland Shire.

Parish maps dating from 1880 show Scylla and Carina Roads clearly dissecting the area known as Oyster Bay. These were boundary lines between the individual Holt acreages. The Parish Map of 1913 shows a subdivision, called "By the Water Estate", with an early alignment of Caravan Head, Como and Oyster Bay Roads. The first house, situated at 19 Como Road was built in 1910. It belonged to Samuel and Eliza Hall. A general store was opened in 1925. The 1925 Parish Map has "The Village of Oyster Bay" written on it. The suburb's name was officially recognised in 1933. Oyster Bay Public School was opened in 1945. Oyster Bay developed after this with post World War II migration creating a need for the release of land for housing.

A feature of Oyster Bay is that steps and pathways, which were built during the 1930s, provide pedestrian access from the highest part of the suburb to the shops beside the bay. Steps and a pathway also lead from Green Point to Como, giving access to the old Como railway station and to Como Public School (est. 1921).

== Commercial area ==
A small arrangement of shops is located at the intersection of Como Road and Oyster Bay Road, just above sea level. It includes a post office, chemist, a liquor shop, a café, a newsagency, and a bakery/café. Oyster Bay Public School is nearby.

== Churches ==
Churches in Oyster Bay include St Joseph Catholic Church, located on the border of Oyster Bay & Como, Oyster Bay Baptist Church, located at Green Point and Kingsway Community Church.

== School ==
Oyster Bay Public School holds its annual Arts and Craft festival every year in the last weekend of May. The festival has taken place annually since 1970 with a 2020-22 hiatus caused by the COVID-19 pandemic. Oyster Bay Public School is split between two locations on Phillip Street: primary site (Year 3-6) and the infants site (Kindergarten-Year 2), 300 metres up the road. There are two pre-schools in Oyster Bay. One is at Caravan Head, and another at Green Point in the same area as Green Point Observatory.

== Parks ==
Oyster Bay Oval lies on the bay. It was reclaimed in the 1960s from the Mangroves which surround the bay. It is home to the local Soccer & Cricket clubs.

Caravan Head Bushland Reserve is located in the northern part of Oyster Bay.

== Sport ==
There are a number of local clubs in other sports throughout Oyster Bay. Notable ones include:

Clubs
Team	Sport
Georges River Tigers	Soccer
Oyster Bay Bullets	Basketball
Green Point Kookaburras	Netball

== Transport ==
The area is serviced by U-Go Mobility buses, which travel around Caravan Head 10 times per day. It is a short distance from both Jannali railway station and Como railway station. Roads connect the suburb to the nearby Princes Highway at Kareela and to Sutherland.

== Population ==
According to the 2021 census of Population, there were 5,689 people usually resident in Oyster Bay. 19.2% stated they were born overseas with the top countries of birth being England 4.2%, China 1.5%, New Zealand 1.4%, South Africa 0.6% and Ireland 0.5%. English was stated as the only language spoken at home by 88.3% of residents and the most common other languages spoken were Mandarin 1.4%, Greek 1.3%, Cantonese 0.6%, German 0.5% and Spanish 0.5%. The most common responses for religion were No Religion 36.2%, Catholic 28.9%, Anglican 17.1%, Eastern Orthodox 3.6% and Not stated 3.0%.

== Notable residents ==
- Rachel & Ryan Carr, 2nd place on the 18th season of the Australian reality TV competition The Block, The Block: Tree Change
