= The Block season 20 =

Season of television series

The Block
- Season 20
- No. of episodes: 52

Release
- Original network: Nine Network
- Original release: 12 August – 10 November 2024

Season chronology
- ← Previous; Season 19 Next → Season 21

The twentieth season of Australian reality television series The Block premiered on 12 August 2024 on the Nine Network. Hosts Scott Cam and Shelley Craft, Dan Reilly takes over being site foremen from Keith Schleiger as he was unable to move to Phillip Island full time, and judges Shaynna Blaze and Darren Palmer, all returning from the previous season, with Marty Fox replacing Neale Whitaker as judge.

== Production ==
Applications for the twentieth season of the series opened in September 2023 until 15 October 2023, looking for couples aged between 18 and 65 years old being sought by casting agents. Filming was expected to be a 12-week shoot period from late February 2024. In September 2023, the twentieth season of The Block was officially confirmed at Nine's 2024 upfronts. The location for this season was set to be in Daylesford, Victoria, but due to permit issues and complaints by local residents, Nine decided not to build in the area and started searching for a new location. In October 2023, it was reported Nine had purchased the Island Cove Villas, set over 2.5 acres, for $9.5 Million on Phillip Island. On 3 November 2023, the location was officially confirmed by Nine. In December 2023, a tall privacy wall was built around the perimeter of the location to prevent locals from entering the premises. In May 2024, foreman Keith Schleiger announced he would be drawing back his appearance to guest this season due to family commitments. On 26 June 2024, the first teaser was shown which also revealed the contestants. It was also revealed that longtime judge Neale Whitaker would not be returning to the show as a regular judge, after previously stepping back on judging duties in 2023. Marty Fox was to return as his replacement, and Whitaker would make a guest appearance.

During the fifth week of filming, Jesse & Paige decided to leave the competition based on advice from the series psychologist, and a new team took their place with four rooms already complete. Former contestants Ronnie and Georgia filled their place for one day as a prank before Maddy and Charlotte, sisters and home flippers from New South Wales, joined The Block in the following episode. They are the youngest ever duo to compete on the show.

After the reveals of the final room, front yards, Kylie and Brad decided to leave and did not return for the final challenge. However, they did return on auction day. The last challenge, the club house, had all-stars return, but since Kylie and Brad did not come back to the work site, their all-star team, Jimmy & Tam (season 16 winners), had to renovate their rooms on their own.

The Block auctions (or Block-tions) for the houses were held on Saturday, 9 November 2024, with the final episode of 2024 airing the next day on Channel Nine and 9Now at 7:00 pm (AEDT) on Sunday, 10 November 2024.

== Contestants ==
House	Couple	Age	Location	Relationship	Occupations
~~1~~	~~Jesse Maguire & Paige Beechey~~	~~29 & 27~~	~~Perth, WA~~	~~Engaged~~	~~Carpenter & claims specialist~~
1	Maddy & Charlotte Harry	25 & 22	Sydney, NSW	Sisters	Freelance home flippers
2	Courtney McInnes & Grant Freeman	32 & 29	Denmham Court, NSW	Married couple	Events account director and furniture designer & landscape business development manager
3	Ricky Recard & Haydn Wise	34 & 37	Melbourne, VIC	Best mates	Plumber & IT worker
4	Kylie & Brad Baker	37 & 32	Cairns, QLD	Married parents	Hairdresser and business owner & electrician and plumber
5	Kristian & Mimi Belperio	31 & 28	Adelaide, SA	Newlyweds	Electrician & restaurant manager

== Score history ==
Teams' progress summarised through the competition
	Teams					
	~~Jesse & Paige~~	Maddy & Charlotte	Courtney & Grant	Ricky & Haydn	Kylie & Brad	Kristian & Mimi
Rooms	Scores					
Main Bathroom	18 1/2	—	28	24	22	28 1/2
Guest Bedroom	27	—	27 1/2	22	22	28
Main Ensuite	27 1/2	—	28	4	23	21 1/2
Guest Bedroom 2	26 1/2	—	27	26 1/2	27 1/2	28
Main Bedroom & Walk In Robe	—	24 1/2	28	21 1/2	27 1/2	28
Kitchen	—	29	27	23	29 1/2	26 1/2
Guest Ensuite	—	27 1/2	24	25	24 1/2	24 1/2
Living & Dining	—	25 1/2	26 1/2	25	29 1/2	23 1/2
Office Rumpus	—	28	23 1/2	28	16	12 1/2
Guest Bedroom & Laundry	—	20	29 1/2	29	22 1/2	20 1/2
Backyard	—	37	39	32	27	35
Frontyard	—	31	38	36 1/2	26	31 1/2
Disney+ Club House	—	28 1/2	28 1/2	27 1/2	29	30

=== Weekly room expenditures ===
Week	Room(s)	Budget	Costs					
Week	Room(s)	Budget	~~Jesse & Paige~~	Maddy & Charlotte	Courtney & Grant	Ricky & Haydn	Kylie & Brad	Kristian & Mimi
1	Main Bathroom	$250,000 divided	$26,968	—	$35,016	$31,848	$27,739	$21,732
2	Guest Bedroom	$250,000 divided	$9,078	—	$7,805	$8,240	$11,115	$11,730
3	Main Ensuite	$250,000 divided	$23,758	—	$20,575	$13,162	$22,225	$32,805
4	Guest Bedroom 2	$250,000 divided	$14,383	—	$8,946	$13,949	$9,505	$18,135
5	Main Bedroom & Walk In Robe	$250,000 divided	—	$22,537	$27,638	$25,405	$18,598	$19,570
6	Kitchen	$250,000 divided	—	$15,253	$13,402	$16,869	$12,030	$20,815
7	Guest Ensuite	$250,000 divided	—	$19,756	$27,573	$33,112	$28,148	$27,722
8	Living & Dining	$250,000 divided	—	$34,719	$36,282	$49,479	$50,235	$14,552
9	Office Rumpus	$250,000 divided	—	$38,108	$28,627	$40,647	$31,367	$34,330
10	Guest Bedroom & Laundry	$250,000 divided	—	$36,043	$26,362	$30,544	$26,260	$34,160
11	Backyard	$250,000 divided	—	$75,000				
12	Frontyard	$250,000 divided	—					
13	Disney+ Club House		—					
Running total costs			$74,187	$241,416	$232,226	$263,255	$237,222	$235,551

=== Weekly room prize ===
Week	Room	Winning team	Prize
1	Main Bathroom	Kristian & Mimi	$10k courtesy of Ford, $30k Wolf BBQ and $100k voucher for Camerich Furniture
2	Guest Bedroom	Kristian & Mimi	$10k courtesy of Ford
3	Main Ensuite	Courtney & Grant	$10k and a night away to InterContinental Sorrento courtesy of Ford
4	Guest Bedroom 2	Kristian & Mimi	$10k courtesy of Ford,$10k worth of Gucci dress and earrings, $10k wardrobe upgrade courtesy of Häfele and a night away to 5 Acres
5	Main Bedroom & Walk In Robe	Courtney & Grant	$5k each courtesy of Ford
5	Main Bedroom & Walk In Robe	Kristian & Mimi	$5k each courtesy of Ford
6	Kitchen	Kylie & Brad	$10k and a night away to the W in Melbourne, a night of luxury courtesy of Ford
7	Guest Ensuite	Maddy & Charlotte	$10k and a night away with Scotty to Hotel Chadstone Holism courtesy of Ford
8	Living & Dining	Kylie & Brad	$20k for scoring two 10's, $10k, a helicopter trip and night away to Ecohuts with Scotty courtesy of Ford
9	Office Rumpus	Maddy & Charlotte	5k each courtesy of Ford and 10k each for scoring a 10. Both teams will go to dinner with Scotty Cam to the Maha Restaurant.
9	Office Rumpus	Ricky & Haydn	5k each courtesy of Ford and 10k each for scoring a 10. Both teams will go to dinner with Scotty Cam to the Maha Restaurant.
10	Guest Bedroom & Laundry	Courtney & Grant	10k courtesy of Ford, 10k courtesy from Freedom towards their backyards and a night away with Scotty Cam
11	Backyard	Courtney & Grant	10k courtesy of Ford, 20k for scoring 2 10's courtesy of Arnott's and a night away with Scotty Cam to the Flinders Hotel
12	Frontyard	Courtney & Grant	Ford Mustang Mach-E worth $80,000 courtesy of Ford
13	Disney+ Club House	Kristian & Mimi	$50,000 off their reserve price

== Results ==
=== Judges' scores ===
Colour key
Highest score
Lowest score

Summary of judges' scores
Week	Area(s)	Scores	Teams					
Week	Area(s)	Scores	~~Jesse & Paige~~	Maddy & Charlotte	Courtney & Grant	Ricky & Haydn	Kylie & Brad	Kristian & Mimi
1	Main Bathroom	Darren	6 1/2	—	9 1/2	9	8	9 1/2
1	Main Bathroom	Marty	6	—	9 1/2	7 1/2	6	9 1/2
1	Main Bathroom	Shaynna	6	—	9	7 1/2	8	9 1/2
1	Main Bathroom	Total	18 1/2	—	28	24	22	28 1/2
2	Guest Bedroom	Darren	9 1/2	—	9 1/2	8 1/2	7 1/2	9 1/2
2	Guest Bedroom	Marty	8 1/2	—	8 1/2	6 1/2	8	9 1/2
2	Guest Bedroom	Shaynna	9	—	9 1/2	7	6 1/2	9
2	Guest Bedroom	Total	27	—	27 1/2	22	22	28
3	Main Ensuite	Darren	10	—	9 1/2	1 1/2	8	7
3	Main Ensuite	Marty	9	—	9 1/2	1 1/2	8	7 1/2
3	Main Ensuite	Shaynna	8 1/2	—	9	1	7	7
3	Main Ensuite	Total	27 1/2	—	28	4	23	21 1/2
4	Guest Bedroom 2	Darren	9	—	9	9	9 1/2	9 1/2
4	Guest Bedroom 2	Marty	8 1/2	—	9 1/2	8 1/2	9	9
4	Guest Bedroom 2	Shaynna	9	—	8 1/2	9	9	9 1/2
4	Guest Bedroom 2	Total	26 1/2	—	27	26 1/2	27 1/2	28
5	Main Bedroom & Walk In Robe Week	Darren	—	8 1/2	9 1/2	7 1/2	9 1/2	9 1/2
5	Main Bedroom & Walk In Robe Week	Marty	—	8	9 1/2	7	8 1/2	9
5	Main Bedroom & Walk In Robe Week	Shaynna	—	8	9	7	9 1/2	9 1/2
5	Main Bedroom & Walk In Robe Week	Total	—	24 1/2	28	21 1/2	27 1/2	28
6	Kitchen	Darren	—	10	9 1/2	8	9 1/2	9 1/2
6	Kitchen	Marty	—	9 1/2	8 1/2	7 1/2	9 1/2	8
6	Kitchen	Shaynna	—	9 1/2	9	7 1/2	9 1/2	9
6	Kitchen	Total	—	29	27	23	29 1/2	26 1/2
7	Guest Ensuite	Darren	—	9 1/2	8 1/2	9	8 1/2	8
7	Guest Ensuite	Marty	—	9	7 1/2	8	7 1/2	8 1/2
7	Guest Ensuite	Shaynna	—	9	8	8	8 1/2	8
7	Guest Ensuite	Total	—	27 1/2	24	25	24 1/2	24 1/2
8	Living & Dining	Darren	—	8 1/2	9	8	9 1/2	9
8	Living & Dining	Marty	—	9	8 1/2	8 1/2	10	7 1/2
8	Living & Dining	Shaynna	—	8	9	9 1/2	10	7
8	Living & Dining	Total	—	25 1/2	26 1/2	25	29 1/2	23 1/2
9	Office Rumpus	Darren	—	9	8	9	5	4
9	Office Rumpus	Marty	—	10	8	9	5	4
9	Office Rumpus	Shaynna	—	9	7 1/2	10	6	4 1/2
9	Office Rumpus	Total	—	28	23 1/2	28	16	12 1/2
10	Guest Bedroom & Laundry	Darren	—	7	9 1/2	9 1/2	7 1/2	7
10	Guest Bedroom & Laundry	Marty	—	7	9 1/2	9 1/2	7 1/2	6 1/2
10	Guest Bedroom & Laundry	Shaynna	—	6	9 1/2	10	7 1/2	7
10	Guest Bedroom & Laundry	Total	—	20	29 1/2	29	22 1/2	20 1/2
11	Backyard	Dave	—	9	9 1/2	7 1/2	6 1/2	9
11	Backyard	Darren	—	9 1/2	10	9	7	9
11	Backyard	Marty	—	9 1/2	9 1/2	7 1/2	6 1/2	8 1/2
11	Backyard	Shaynna	—	9	10	8	7	8 1/2
11	Backyard	Total	—	37	39	32	27	35
12	Front yard	Dave	—	7 1/2	9 1/2	9 1/2	6 1/2	8
12	Front yard	Darren	—	8	9 1/2	9 1/2	7	8
12	Front yard	Marty	—	8 1/2	9 1/2	8 1/2	6 1/2	7 1/2
12	Front yard	Shaynna	—	7	9 1/2	9	6	8
12	Front yard	Total	—	31	38	36 1/2	26	31 1/2

=== Challenge scores ===
Summary of challenge scores
Week	Challenge		Reward	Teams					
Week	Challenge	Description	Reward	~~Jesse & Paige~~	Maddy & Charlotte	Courtney & Grant	Ricky & Haydn	Kylie & Brad	Kristian & Mimi
1	A Game of Chance	Choose a penguin sculpture which has a colour on the back corresponding to one of the houses	Decides their house	Blue (House 1)	—N/a	Red (House 2)	Yellow (House 3)	Green (House 4)	Purple (House 5)
3	Penguin nesting box	The teams must create a nesting box for the penguins and the team that makes the best one will win.	$5000 & Bonus Point	—	—N/a	—	—	1st	—
4	Catch the Fish	The teams must catch a fish with the team with the heaviest fish wins	A Tommy Trout sign and $1000	—	—N/a	—	Won	—	—
4	Cook the Fish	Teams must cook a meal with the caught fish from the previous challenge; the best dish wins.	Bar Crusher Fishing Boat valued at $100k	—	—N/a	—	Won	—	—
5	Paper mache lamp	The teams must design a paper mache lamp to display in their bedroom and the team that makes the best one will win.	$5000 & $20000 Painting	—N/a	—	—	Won	—	—
6	Surf Club Renovation Challenge	The teams were divided into 2 teams and they will be renovating a mutli use area of Woolamai Beach Surf Life Saving Club, a volunteer lifesaving service on Phillip Island.	$10,000	—N/a	Team 2: Ocean side	Team 2: Ocean side	Team 1: Island side	Team 1: Island side	Team 2: Ocean side
7	The Block Art Exhibition Challenge	The teams have to paint a surfboard as a functional art piece that will be displayed in their homes	Gets to decide which space they would like to create in the Disney+ clubhouse and a bonus point gnome	—N/a	3rd place	1st place	4nd place	2nd place	5th place
7	Basketball Challenge	Blockheads played a game of round-robin	$5000	—N/a	runner-up		won		
8	Racing Challenge	The teams have to race in go-karts having 10 laps.Each pairs' fastest combined lap would be tallied to determine who placed first, second and third	1st place: $5000, 2nd place: $3000 and 3rd place:$2000	—N/a			1st place	3rd place	2nd place
9	Hallway Challenge	The teams need to complete their hallways as it was allocated to a week and will be judges by Neale Whitaker, Scott Cam and Shelley Craft	$10,000	—N/a		won			
9	Domain Buyers Jury	The teams open their homes to 100 possible buyers and the buyers vote on whose house they like the most	$50,000 and lunch with Alice Stolz and Shelley Craft	—N/a	8%	17%	29%	19%	27%
10	Fun Fair Challenge	the teams have to create a carnival stall stand.	$10,000	—N/a	Frozen themed	Giant-sized Guess Who? style game	Raffle	Balloon popping	Dunk tank
10	Depreciation Schedule Challenge	The teams have to calculate a value nearest the estimate Depreciation value of their houses compared to BMT	$7,895.10	—N/a	$5,329,591.10	$2,553,772.25	$4,195,800.22	$4,268,462	$3,620,266.36
13	Disney+ Clubhouse Challenge	The teams have to create a designated space in the clubhouse that was picked by them in week 7 in the order of winning the Block Art Challenge. Each team is paired up with an all-stars team from previous seasons.	$50,000 off their auctions reserves	—N/a	Ronnie & Georgia; BBQ Area	Steph & Gian; Spa Area	Eliza & Liberty; Alfresco Area	Jimmy & Tam; Games Area	Alisa & Lydandra; Cinema & Kitchen Area

== Auction ==
Auction results
Rank	Couple	Reserve	Auction result	Profit made	Total profit	Auction order
1	Maddy & Charlotte	$1.95m	$3.5m	$1.55m	$1.65m	5
2	Courtney & Grant	$1.95m	$3.3m	$1.35m	$1.35m	1
3	Kristian & Mimi	$1.9m	$2.930m	$1.030m	$1.030m	3
4	Ricky & Haydn	$1.95m	$2.7m	$750,000	$750,000	4
5	Kylie & Brad	$1.95m	$2.6m	$650,000	$650,000	2

== Ratings ==
The Block 2024 national reach and total viewership and nightly position Colour key – Highest rating during the series – Lowest rating during the series
Week	Episode		Original airdate	Timeslot	National reach viewers (millions) (Note: Ratings data is from OzTAM and represents the national reach and national average viewership.)	National total viewers (millions)	Nightly rank	Source
1	1	"Welcome to The Block"	12 August 2024	Monday 7:30 pm	2.540	1.108	1	
1	2	"Main Bathroom Begins"	13 August 2024	Tuesday 7:30 pm	2.025	1.005	3	
1	3	"Main Bathroom Continues"	14 August 2024	Wednesday 7:30 pm	1.887	0.974	3	
2	4	"Main Bathrooms Revealed"	18 August 2024	Sunday 7:00 pm	2.357	1.199	2	
2	5	"Guest Bedroom Begins"	19 August 2024	Monday 7:30 pm	1.918	1.013	3	
2	6	"Guest Bedroom Continues"	20 August 2024	Tuesday 7:30 pm	1.881	0.95	3	
2	7	"Guest Bedroom Shock"	21 August 2024	Wednesday 7:30 pm	1.708	0.865	4	
3	8	"Guest Bedroom Revealed"	25 August 2024	Sunday 7:00 pm	2.261	1.257	3	
3	9	"Master Ensuite Begins"	26 August 2024	Monday 7:30 pm	1.788	0.972	4	
3	10	"Penguin Nesting Box Challenge"	27 August 2024	Tuesday 7:30 pm	1.920	0.940	3	
3	11	" Master Ensuite Continues"	28 August 2024	Wednesday 7:30 pm	1.857	0.910	3	
4	12	"Master Ensuite Revealed"	1 September 2024	Sunday 7:00 pm	2.371	1.211	1	
4	13	"Guest Bedroom 2 Begins"	2 September 2024	Monday 7:30 pm	1.922	1.039	3	
4	14	"Guest Bedroom 2 Continues"	3 September 2024	Tuesday 7:30 pm	1.947	1.056	3	
4	15	"Fishing Challenge"	4 September 2024	Wednesday 7:30 pm	1.745	0.970	3	
5	16	"Guest Bedroom 2 Revealed"	8 September 2024	Sunday 7:00 pm	2.413	1.288	1	
5	17	"Main Bedroom & Walk In Robe Begins"	9 September 2024	Monday 7:30 pm	2.111	1.153	2	
5	18	"Lampshade Challenge"	10 September 2024	Tuesday 7:30 pm	1.927	1.044	3	
5	19	"Main Bedroom & Walk In Robe Continues"	11 September 2024	Wednesday 7:30 pm	1.872	0.987	3	
6	20	"Main Bedroom & Walk In Robe Revealed"	15 September 2024	Sunday 7:00pm	2.446	1.343	1	
6	21	"Kitchen Week Begins"	16 September 2024	Monday 7:30 pm	1.970	1.076	3	
6	22	"Kitchen Week Continues"	17 September 2024	Tuesday 7:30 pm	1.905	1.075	3	
6	23	"Kitchen Week Continues"	18 September 2024	Wednesday 7:30 pm	1.941	1.045	2	
7	24	"Kitchen Week Revealed"	22 September 2024	Sunday 7:00pm	2.290	1.273	1	
7	25	"Guest Ensuite Begins"	23 September 2024	Monday 7:30 pm	1.896	0.990	4	
7	26	"The Block Art Exhibition Challenge"	24 September 2024	Tuesday 7:30 pm	1.992	1.092	2	
7	27	"Guest Ensuite Continues"	25 September 2024	Wednesday 7:30 pm	1.850	1.016	3	
8	28	"Guest Ensuite Revealed"	29 September 2024	Sunday 7:00pm	2.413	1.315	1	
8	29	"Living & Dining Begins"	30 September 2024	Monday 7:30 pm	1.945	1.025	2	
8	30	"Racing Challenge"	1 October 2024	Tuesday 7:30 pm	1.703	0.970	4	
8	31	"Living & Dining Continues"	2 October 2024	Wednesday 7:30 pm	1.825	0.993	3	
9	32	"Living & Dining Revealed"	7 October 2024	Monday 7:30 pm	2.182	1.236	1	
9	33	"Office Rumpus Begins"	8 October 2024	Tuesday 7:30 pm	1.984	1.070	2	
9	34	"Office Rumpus Continues"	9 October 2024	Wednesday 7:30 pm	1.947	1.030	2	
9	35	"Office Rumpus Continues"	10 October 2024	Thursday 7:30 pm	1.863	0.959	2	
10	36	"Office Rumpus Revealed"	13 October 2024	Sunday 7:00pm	2.414	1.318	3	
10	37	"Guest Bedroom & Laundry Begins"	14 October 2024	Monday 7:30 pm	1.984	1.114	3	
10	38	"Guest Bedroom & Laundry Continues"	15 October 2024	Tuesday 7:30 pm	2.028	1.094	2	
10	39	"Guest Bedroom & Laundry Continues"	16 October 2024	Wednesday 7:30 pm	1.853	0.966	2	
11	40	"Guest Bedroom & Laundry Revealed"	20 October 2024	Sunday 7:00pm	2.516	1.320	1	
11	41	"Backyard Begins"	21 October 2024	Monday 7:30 pm	2.033	1.102	2	
11	42	"Backyard Continues"	22 October 2024	Tuesday 7:30 pm	1.837	1.098	3	
11	43	"Backyard Continues"	23 October 2024	Wednesday 7:30 pm	1.760	1.062	3	
12	44	"Backyard Revealed"	27 October 2024	Sunday 7:00pm	2.467	1.415	1	
12	45	"Frontyard Week Begins"	28 October 2024	Monday 7:30 pm	2.171	1.248	1	
12	46	"Frontyard Week Continues"	29 October 2024	Tuesday 7:30 pm	2.077	1.219	1	
12	47	"Frontyard Week Continues"	30 October 2024	Wednesday 7:30 pm	2.034	1.118	1	
13	48	"Frontyard Week Revealed"	3 November 2024	Sunday 7:00pm	2.650	1.527	1	
13	49	"Clubhouse Week"	4 November 2024	Monday 7:30 pm	2.167	1.192	1	
13	50	"Clubhouse Week Continues"	5 November 2024	Tuesday 7:30 pm	2.118	1.180	5	
13	51	"Clubhouse Week Reveal"	6 November 2024	Wednesday 7:30 pm	2.248	1.189	1	
13	52	"Grand Final/ Auctions"	10 November 2024	Sunday 7:00 pm	3.412	2.110	1	
13	52	"Winner Announced"	10 November 2024	Sunday 7:00 pm	2.371	2.190	2	
