= Green Point Observatory =

Astronomical observatory in Australia

Coordinates: 34.00181°S 151.07326°E

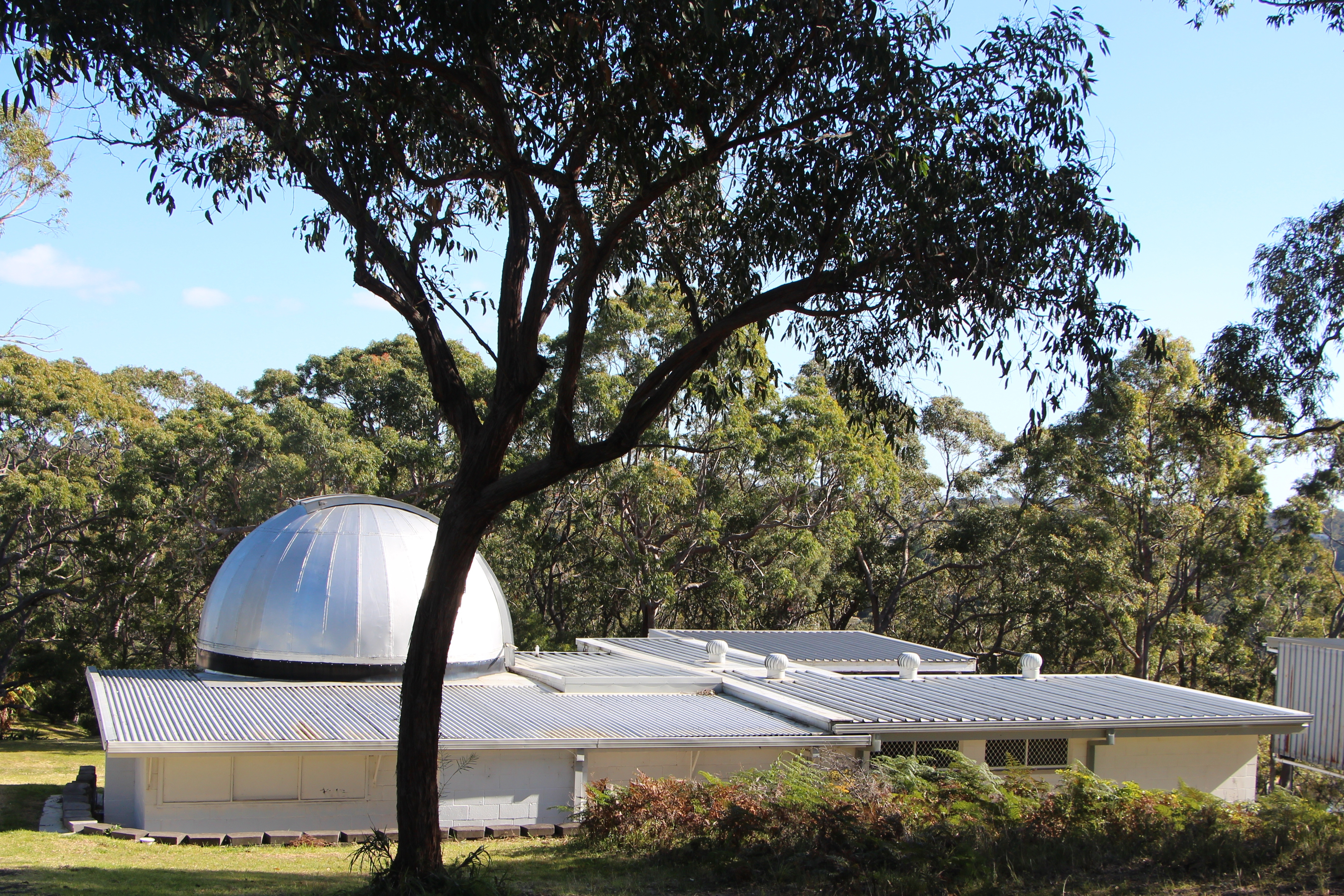
Green Point Observatory's dome gleams in the Sun, 2014.

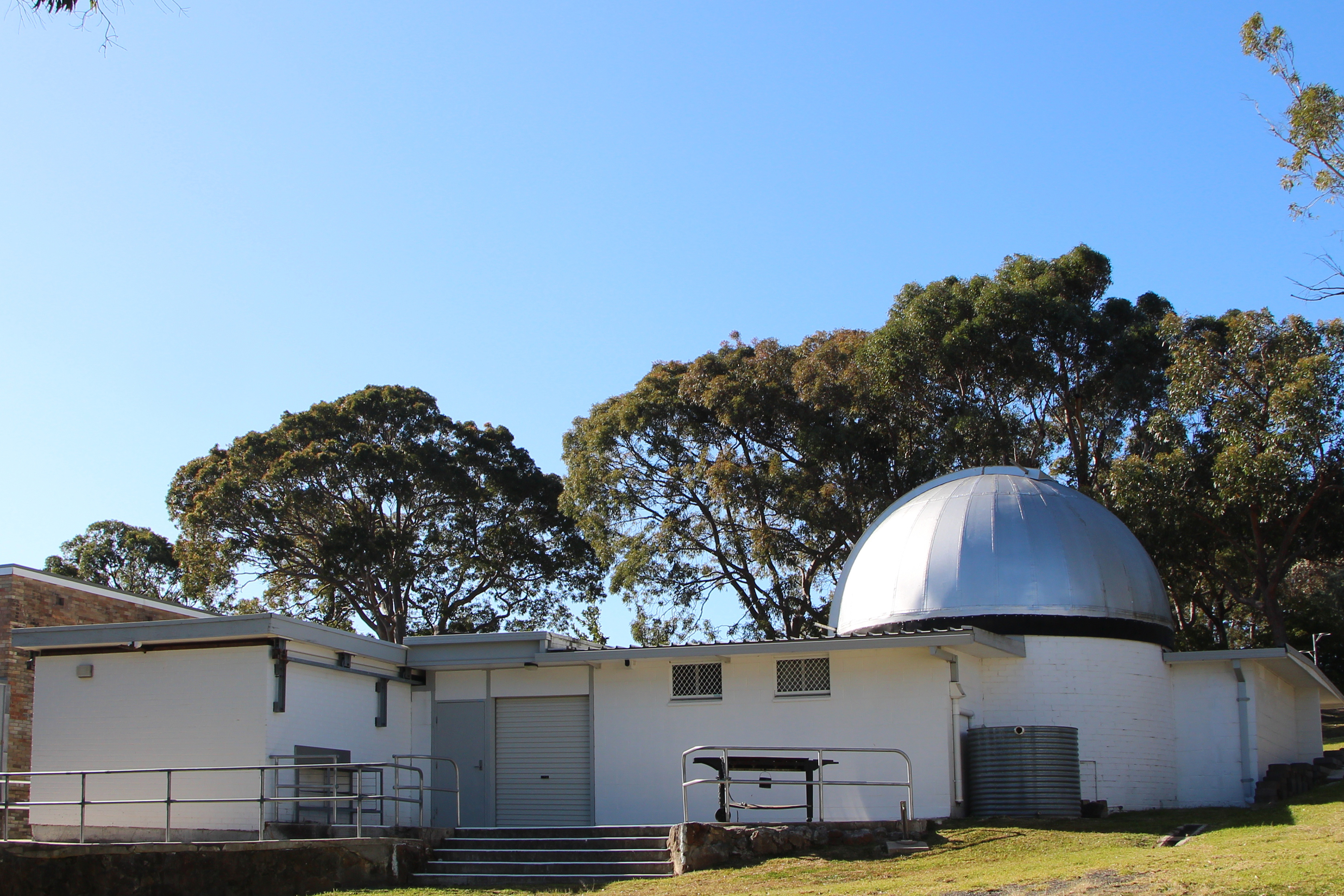
View of Green Point Observatory from the Western side, 2014.

Green Point Observatory is a private astronomical observatory in Oyster Bay, Sydney, Australia, and it is the home of the Sutherland Astronomical Society. It is located at the corner of Green Point and Caravan Head Roads. It consists of a dome, a roll-off roof observatory, a library, and a meeting hall seating 100 people.

The dome and observatory house two large telescopes: a 41 centimetres (16 in) Newtonian telescope and a 35 centimetres (14 in) Schmidt–Cassegrain telescope. The observatory is used by members of the society for observing stars and eclipses, research, astro imaging as well as hosting public education courses and monthly open nights.

The observatory was first constructed on the site, completed in 1969 following the founding of the Sutherland Astronomical Society, then known as the James Cook Astronomers Club. At that time, the observatory consisted of a dome housing a 41 centimetres (16 in) Newtonian telescope and small library. The telescope was made by members of the Society, and it is named in honour of Keith Selby, who was a founder of the Society.

In 1974, a foyer and meeting hall accommodating 50 people was added.

In 1997, a roll-off roof observatory and storeroom was added adjacent to the existing observatory. Soon afterwards, a Celestron 14 inches (36 cm) Schmidt Cassegrain telescope was added, along with CCD imaging equipment.

The observatory was closed for much of 2007 as further additions were made. The two buildings were joined into one, the meeting hall was extended to seat 100 people, and a unisex toilet and library annexe were added.

During COVID-19 lockdowns, extensive maintenance works were undertaken and the observatory resumed public operations in August 2022. The 41cm Selby telescope was upgraded so it is driven by computer, to improve its usability.

The observatory hosts annual public star parties, an annual astronomy course, group bookings for school/scout/community groups as well as excellent facilities for the members of the Sutherland Astronomical Society to meet, image and conduct research.
