= Sutherland Astronomical Society =

Amateur astronomical society in Australia

Sutherland Astronomical Society Inc.
- Abbreviation: SASI
- Formation: 1961
- Legal status: Incorporated association
- Region served: Sutherland Shire in the southern suburbs of Sydney, Australia
- Main organ: Southern Observer Journal
- Website: http://www.sasi.net.au

Sutherland Astronomical Society Incorporated (SASI) (previously known as the James Cook Astronomers Club) is an amateur astronomical society based in the Sutherland Shire, in the southern suburbs of Sydney, Australia. It operates the Green Point Observatory, it is one of the two founding organizations of the National Australian Convention of Amateur Astronomers, and its members have discovered two comets and two novae.

== Activities ==
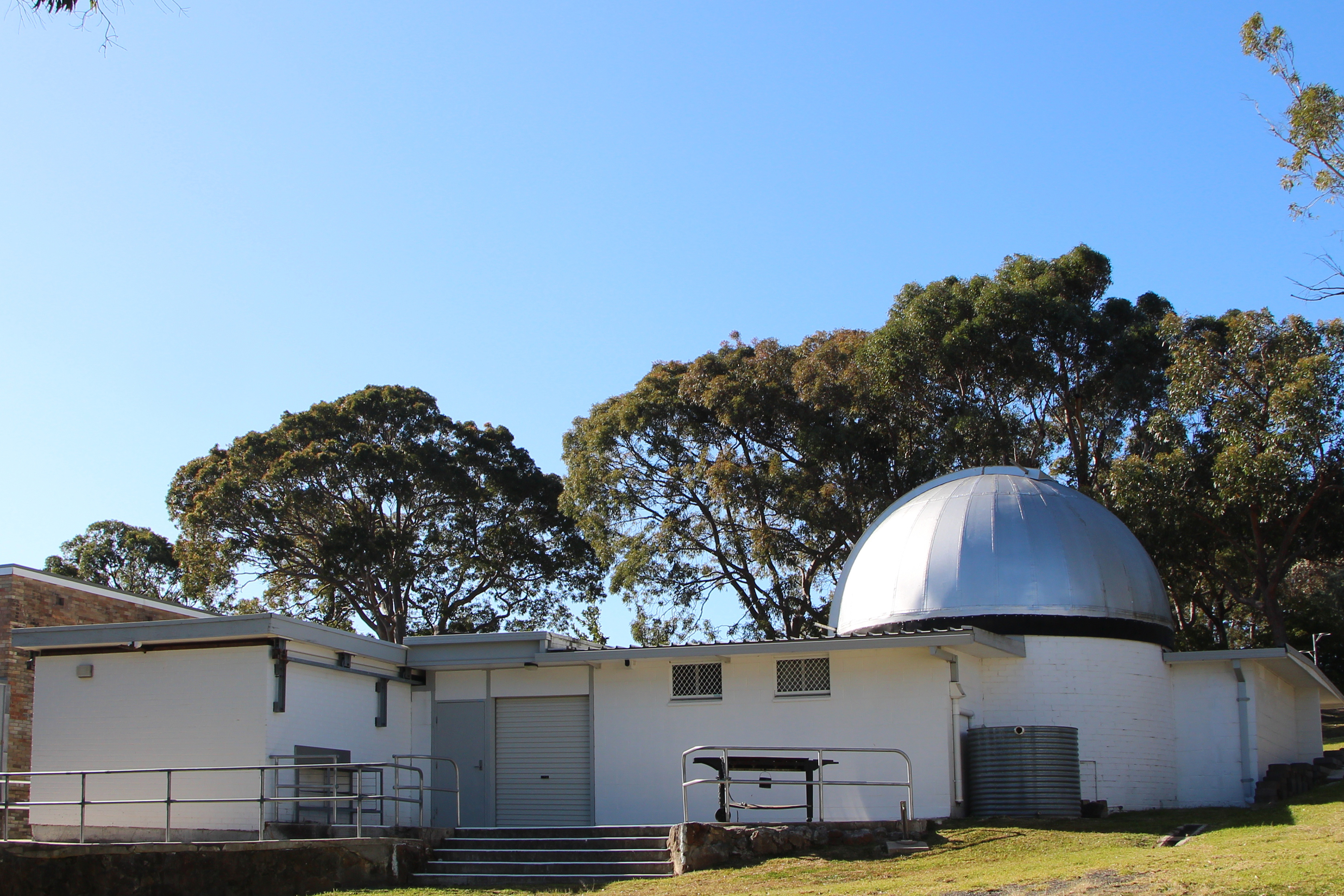
Green Point Observatory is the home of the Sutherland Astronomical Society.

The society meets every Thursday night at the Green Point Observatory. These meetings can take different formats: some meetings have invited speakers who are professional astronomers or specialists in related fields, keeping members updated with the latest developments in research and technology. Other meetings are less formal, with members holding discussions among themselves, exchanging techniques, tips and experiences, capturing and processing images, or just observing through the society's telescopes which are kept on site.

In 2016, the society will once again host the prestigious National Australian Convention of Amateur Astronomers (NACAA). This will be the sixth time the society has hosted or co-hosted NACAA.

The society produces a regular official publication for members, named the Southern Observer Journal. (OCLC Number: 222056167).

They support the Public Education Foundation's Stellar Astronomy Scholarship for Girls by providing the winner with society membership and mentoring.

The society is very active at promoting observational astronomy to the public, as well as for its own members at their Green Point Observatory, which is classified as a "designated" optical observatory by the Astronomical Society of Australia on the basis that it is judged to be a valuable astronomical resource for research, education and community use.

They conduct a number of public outreach events, including:

- Public Star Viewing nights, usually in March and August. These events are well supported by the local community, especially for children.
- Group bookings for observing and star parties
- Each year, they run a Practical Astronomy Course called SASPAC.

To assist with these activities, the society is authorized by the police to use high-powered lasers for astronomical purposes.

== History ==
The Society was formed in June 1961, and was then known as the James Cook Astronomers Club (JCAC), named after Captain James Cook, English explorer who first landed in Australia at Kurnell (a suburb in the Sutherland Shire) after successfully observing a transit of Venus from Tahiti.

The Society obtained Council land at Oyster Bay and commenced construction on the Green Point Observatory, the first stage of which, consisting of a dome and library, was completed in 1969. The observatory was extended in 1974 when a meeting hall was added, and further extended in 1997 when the roll-off roof observatory was added, and further in 2007 when the two buildings were merged, and the meeting hall extended, toilet added and kitchen improved.

The JCAC merged with the Pacific Astronomical Society in 1972 and the name was changed to the James Cook Astronomical Society. The name was further changed to Sutherland Astronomical Society in 1978 to further identify the society in the geographical area in which it is located. The Society was incorporated under the Associations Incorporation Act and the word "Incorporated" was added to the name.

In 1966, the James Cook Astronomers Club (as SASI was then known) and the Canberra Astronomical Society met to discuss holding a convention for amateur astronomers across Australia. These discussions resulted in the first National Australian Convention of Amateur Astronomers (NACAA) being held over Easter 1967 at the Australian National University in Canberra, jointly hosted by the James Cook Astronomers Club and the Pacific Astronomical Society These two clubs merged to form SASI, which has since co-hosted conventions in Katoomba (1966), Canberra (1967), Sydney (1988) and Penrith (2008) and sole hosts in 1998 at Sutherland.

When the Astronomy celebrated its fiftieth anniversary in 2011, the famous astronomer Fred Watson addressed their commemorative dinner, which was also covered by the press.

== Logo ==
The Society logo is the galaxy NGC2997 in Antlia and was adopted in 1979 and updated in 2008.

== Discoveries ==
Members of the Society have made the following discoveries:

Comets

- Comet 1998 P1/Williams discovered by life member Peter Williams on 10 August 1998.
- Comet 1999 H1/Lee discovered by member Steven Lee in March 1999.

Each of the two comet discoveries above brought Williams and Lee the Edgar Wilson Award for their discoveries.

Novae

- Nova V382 Velorum by life member Peter Williams on 23 May 1999 (independently co-discovered by P. Williams and A. Gilmore)
- Nova Ophiuchi 2006 also by life member Peter Williams on 6 April 2006.

Each of the two nova discoveries above brought Williams the Nova/Supernova Award of the American Association of Variable Star Observers.

== Past presidents ==
- 1961–1964: Keith Selby
- 1965–1966: Frank Napier
- 1967: Leo Klingen
- 1968: Arthur Northwood
- 1969: Keith Selby
- 1970–1971: Elaine Polglase
- 1972–1978: Mark Rea
- 1979–1988: Greg Hayward
- 1988–1990: Bill Witton
- 1991–1993: Rolando De Michiel
- 1994: Roger North
- 1995–1996: Christopher Toohey
- 1997: Bill Witton
- 1998–1999: Les Dalrymple
- 2000–2006: Brett McMillan
- 2007–2008: Brett Parker
- 2009: Loui Pagano

== See also ==
- List of telescopes of Australia
- List of astronomical societies
