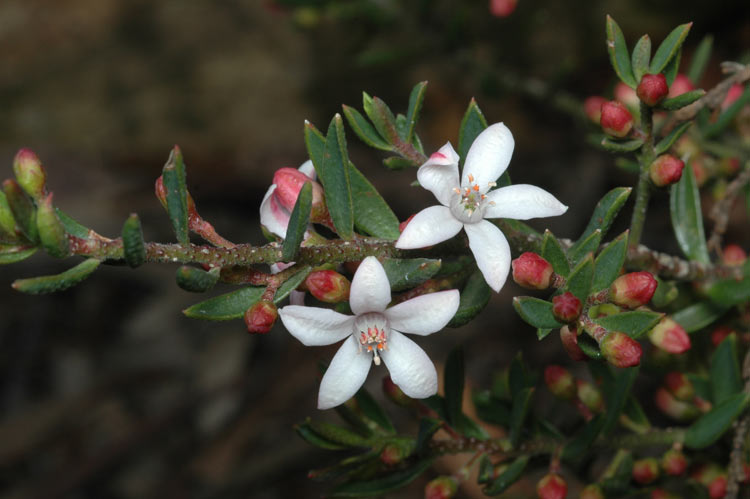
- Subspecies latifolia in the ANBG

Scientific classification
- Kingdom: Plantae
- Clade: Embryophytes
- Clade: Tracheophytes
- Clade: Angiosperms
- Clade: Eudicots
- Clade: Rosids
- Order: Sapindales
- Family: Rutaceae
- Genus: Philotheca
- Species: P. scabra

Binomial name
- Philotheca scabra (Paxton) Paul G.Wilson

Synonyms
- Eriostemon scaber Paxton; Eriostemon scaber Gérard nom. illeg.; Eriostemon scaber Paxton isonym; Eriostemon scaber A.DC. nom. illeg.; Eriostemon scabrum Paxton orth. var.; Eriostemon scabrum Gérard orth. var.; Eriostemon scabrum A.DC. orth. var.

= Philotheca scabra =

Species of plant

Philotheca scabra is a species of flowering plant in the family Rutaceae and is endemic to New South Wales. It is a small shrub with variably shaped leaves, depending on subspecies, and single white to pink flowers arranged on the ends of branchlets.

== Description ==
Philotheca scabra is a shrub that grows to a height of 0.6 m (2 ft 0 in) with more or less bristly stems. The leaves are sessile, 10–15 mm (0.39–0.59 in) long and either more or less cylindrical and folded lengthwise or narrow oblong-elliptic and concave on the lower side. The flowers are borne singly on the ends of branchlets on a peduncle 0.5–2 mm (0.020–0.079 in) long and a pedicel 2–5 mm (0.079–0.197 in) long with two pairs of tiny bracteoles at the base. There are five fleshy, semicircular sepals about 1 mm (0.039 in) long, five elliptical white to pink petals 7–8 mm (0.28–0.31 in) long and ten stamens. Flowering occurs in spring and the fruit is about 7 mm (0.28 in) long with a beak about 3 mm (0.12 in) long.

== Taxonomy ==
This philotheca was first formally described in 1844 by Joseph Paxton who gave it the name Eriostemon scaber and published the description in Paxton's Magazine of Botany from a specimen "in the nursery of Messrs. Henderson, of Pine Apple Place, who received it from the gardens of Baron Hugel, at Vienna, about twelve months back". In 1970, Paul G. Wilson described two subspecies of Eriostemon scaber in the journal Nuytsia:

- Eriostemon scaber subsp. latifolia (Paul G.Wilson) Paul G.Wilson that has glandular-warty stems and leaves about 12 mm (0.47 in) long and 3 mm (0.12 in) wide;
- Eriostemon scaber (Paul G.Wilson) Paul G.Wilson subsp. scaber that has smooth stems and more or less cylindrical leaves.

In 1998, Wilson changed the species name to Philotheca scabra and the subspecies to P. scabra subsp. latifolia and P. scabra subsp. scabra respectively, in a later edition of the same journal: The names of the subspecies are accepted by the Australian Plant Census:

- Philotheca scabra subsp. latifolia (Paul G.Wilson) Paul G.Wilson;
- Philotheca scabra (Paul G.Wilson) Paul G.Wilson subsp. scabra.

== Distribution and habitat ==
Philotheca scabra grows in heath and forest on the coast and nearby ranges of New South Wales between Sydney and the Nerriga and Nowra districts. Subspecies scaber occurs in the northern part of the species' distribution and subsp. latifolius near Nerriga and Nowra.
