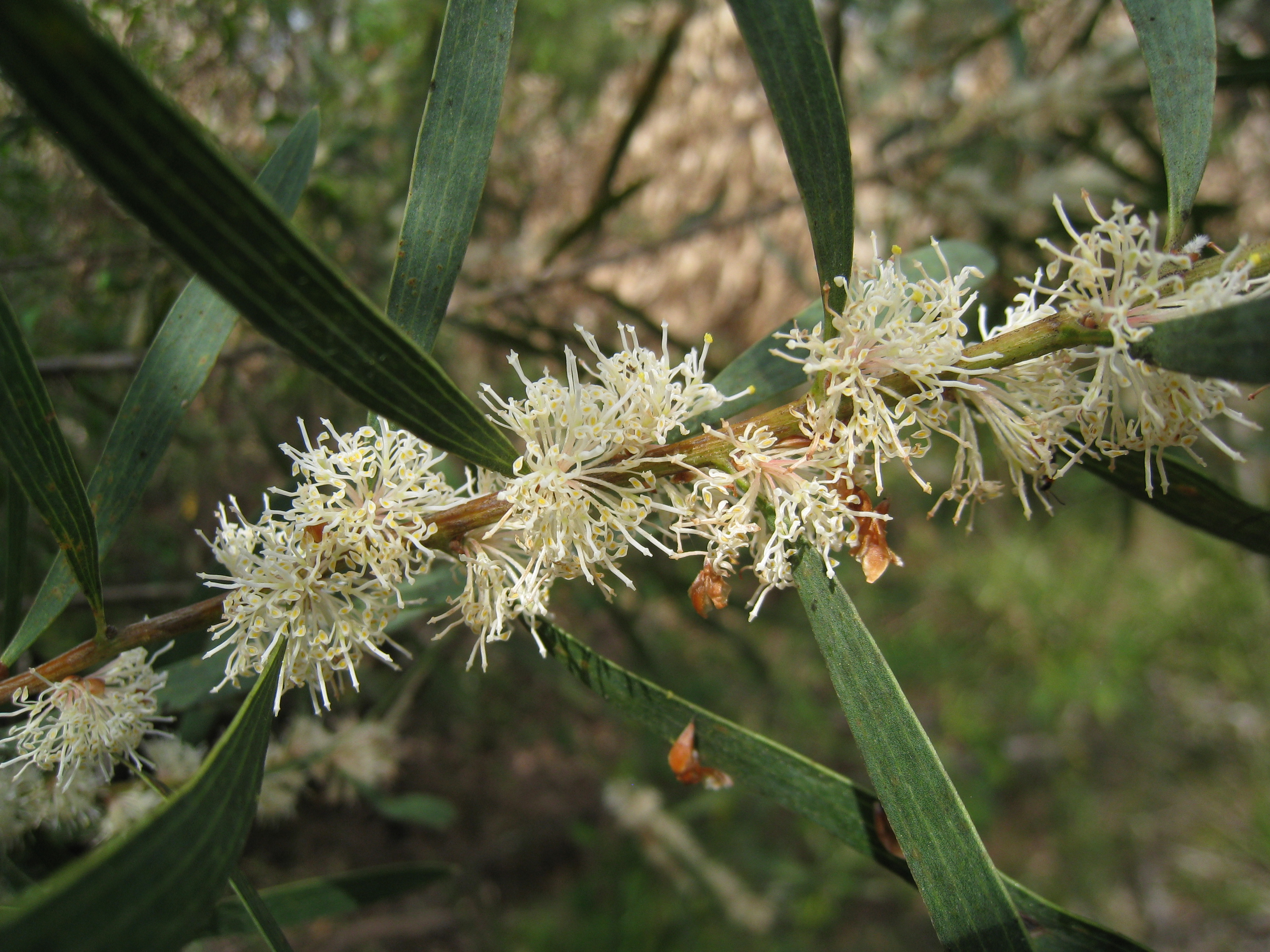

Scientific classification
- Kingdom: Plantae
- Clade: Tracheophytes
- Clade: Angiosperms
- Clade: Eudicots
- Order: Proteales
- Family: Proteaceae
- Genus: Hakea
- Species: H. dactyloides

Binomial name
- Hakea dactyloides (Gaertn.) Cav.
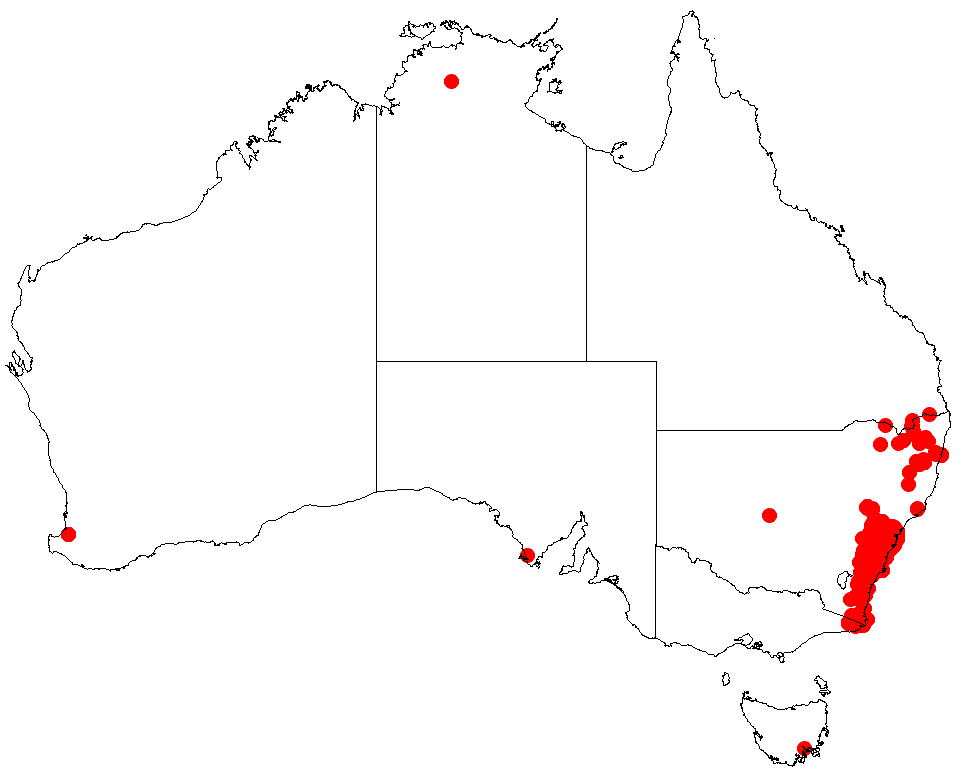
- Occurrence data from AVH

= Hakea dactyloides =

Finger hakea

Species of plant

Hakea dactyloides, commonly known as the finger hakea, is a species of flowering plant in the family Proteaceae. It is endemic to Australia, where it is widely distributed, mainly in southeastern New South Wales. It is an attractive shrub or small tree for the home garden bearing sprays of cream-white flowers.

== Description ==
Hakea dactyloides is a non-lignotuberous upright single-stemmed bushy shrub or small tree 2.4–4.5 m (8–10 ft) tall. Small branches are smooth and generally pale, covered with short matted fine hairs at flowering. Leaves are long and narrow, widest in the middle, rarely narrowly egg-shaped or sickle shaped 3.9–13 cm (2–5 in) long and 5–14.5 mm (0.2–0.6 in) wide. The mid-green leaves taper to a point with three prominent longitudinal veins above and below. The solitary inflorescence has 20–38 white flowers on a short stalk with white flat silky hairs and rarely rust coloured. The sepals and petals are cream-white, the style 4–6.5 mm (0.2–0.3 in) long. Fruit are warty and egg-shaped with a slight curve 2.5–3.5 cm (1–1 in) long and 1.7–2.3 cm (0.7–0.9 in) wide ending with a sharp short point. Small white flowers often with a pink tinge appear along branches in axillary clusters from October to November.

== Taxonomy and naming ==
Hakea dactyloides was first described in 1788 by Joseph Gaertner who gave it the name Banksia dactyloides. In 1800, it was described by Antonio Jose Cavanilles as Hakea dactyloides and published in Anales de Historia Natural. "The ending -oides indicates a resemblance, in this case to dactylos, Greek for finger, presumably a reference to the leaves of this species."

== Distribution and habitat ==
A widespread species growing on the Central Coast, South Coast, Tablelands of N.S.W including the Central Western Slopes and north-eastern Victoria. Hakea dactyloides grows on slopes, ridges and along watercourses on sandstone in sclerophyll forest. A hardy quick growing species tolerant of most situations.
