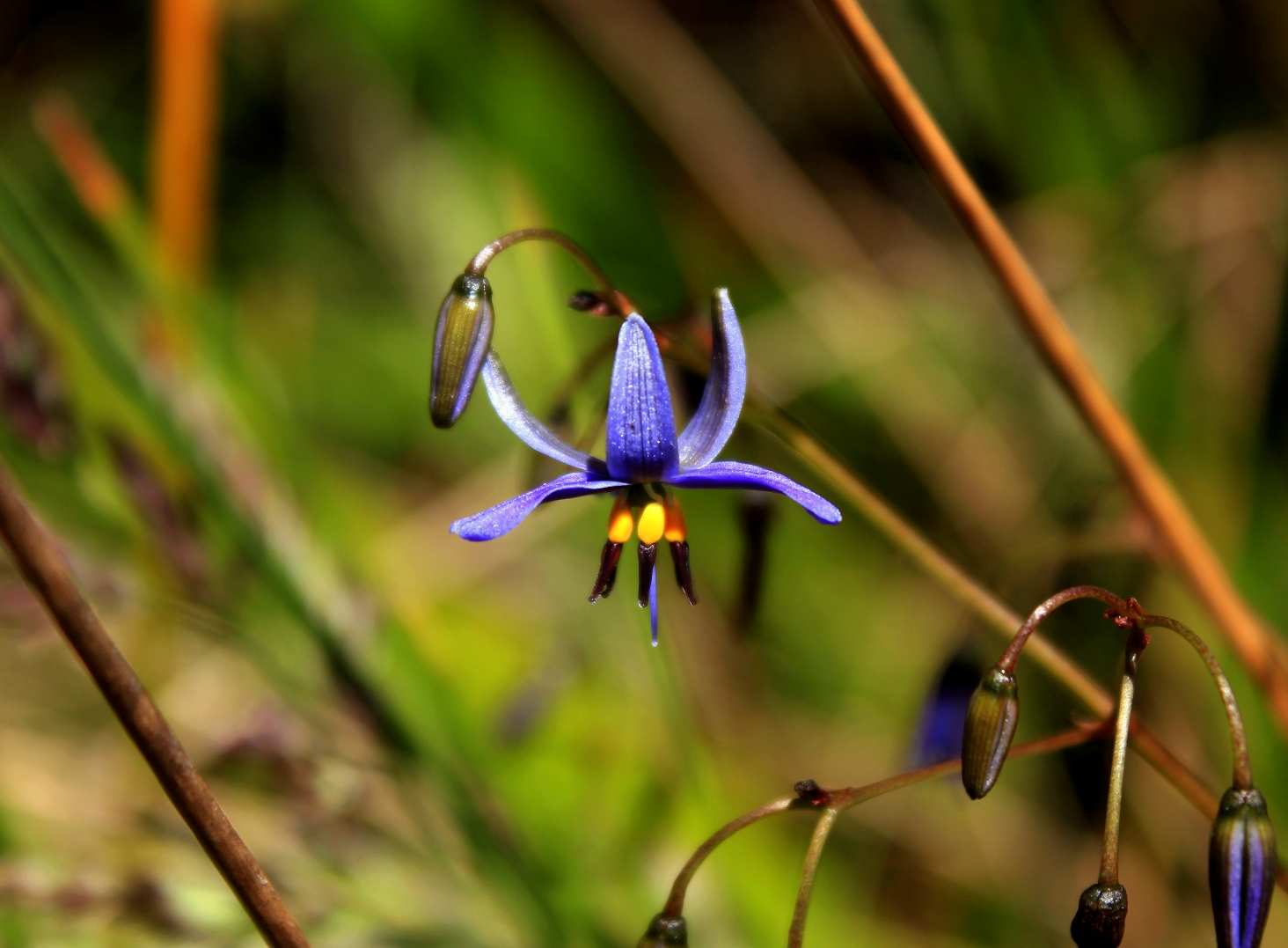
- Near the Great Ocean Road

Scientific classification
- Kingdom: Plantae
- Clade: Tracheophytes
- Clade: Angiosperms
- Clade: Monocots
- Order: Asparagales
- Family: Asphodelaceae
- Subfamily: Hemerocallidoideae
- Genus: Dianella
- Species: D. revoluta

Binomial name
- Dianella revoluta R.Br.

Synonyms
- Of var. revoluta: Dianella admixta Gand.

= Dianella revoluta =

Blueberry lily

Species of flowering plant

Dianella revoluta, commonly known as blueberry lily, blue flax-lily, or black-anther flax-lily, a species of flowering plant in the family Asphodelaceae and is endemic to, and widespread in Australia. It is a tufted, perennial herb with grass-like leaves and up to nine blue or violet flowers with six tepals, and stamens with bright yellow filaments and pale brown to almost black anthers.

== Description ==
Dianella revoluta is a tufted, perennial herb with stems less than 15 cm (5.9 in) long and touching or up to 30 cm (12 in) apart. The leaves are folded lengthwise and grass-like, 15–85 cm (5.9–33.5 in) long and 3–23 mm (0.12–0.91 in) wide. The flowers are blue to violet and are arranged in groups of two to nine, each flower 10–20 mm (0.39–0.79 in) wide on a pedicel 5–35 mm (0.20–1.38 in) long. The three sepals are 5.5–10 mm (0.22–0.39 in) long with five to seven veins and the petals 5.2–9.5 mm (0.20–0.37 in) long with five veins. The stamen filaments are 0.6–2.3 mm (0.024–0.091 in) long and bright yellow, the anthers 2.5–4.5 mm (0.098–0.177 in) long and pale brown to almost black. Flowering mainly occurs from spring to early summer and the fruit is a blue to purple berry, 4–10 mm (0.16–0.39 in) long.

== Taxonomy ==
Dianella revoluta was first formally described in 1810 by Robert Brown in his Prodromus Florae Novae Hollandiae et Insulae Van Diemen.

Five varieties of D. revoluta are accepted by the Australian Plant Census:

- Dianella revoluta var. divaricata (R.Br.) R.J.F.Henderson;
- Dianella revoluta var. minor R.J.F.Henderson;
- Dianella revoluta R.Br. var. revoluta R.J.F.Henderson;
- Dianella revoluta var. tenuis R.J.F.Henderson;
- Dianella revoluta var. vinosa R.J.F.Henderson.

== Distribution and habitat ==
Blueberry lily is common and widespread in all Australian states and the Australian Capital Territory but not the Northern Territory, growing in a wide range of habitats apart from very wet and very dry habitats.

== Uses ==
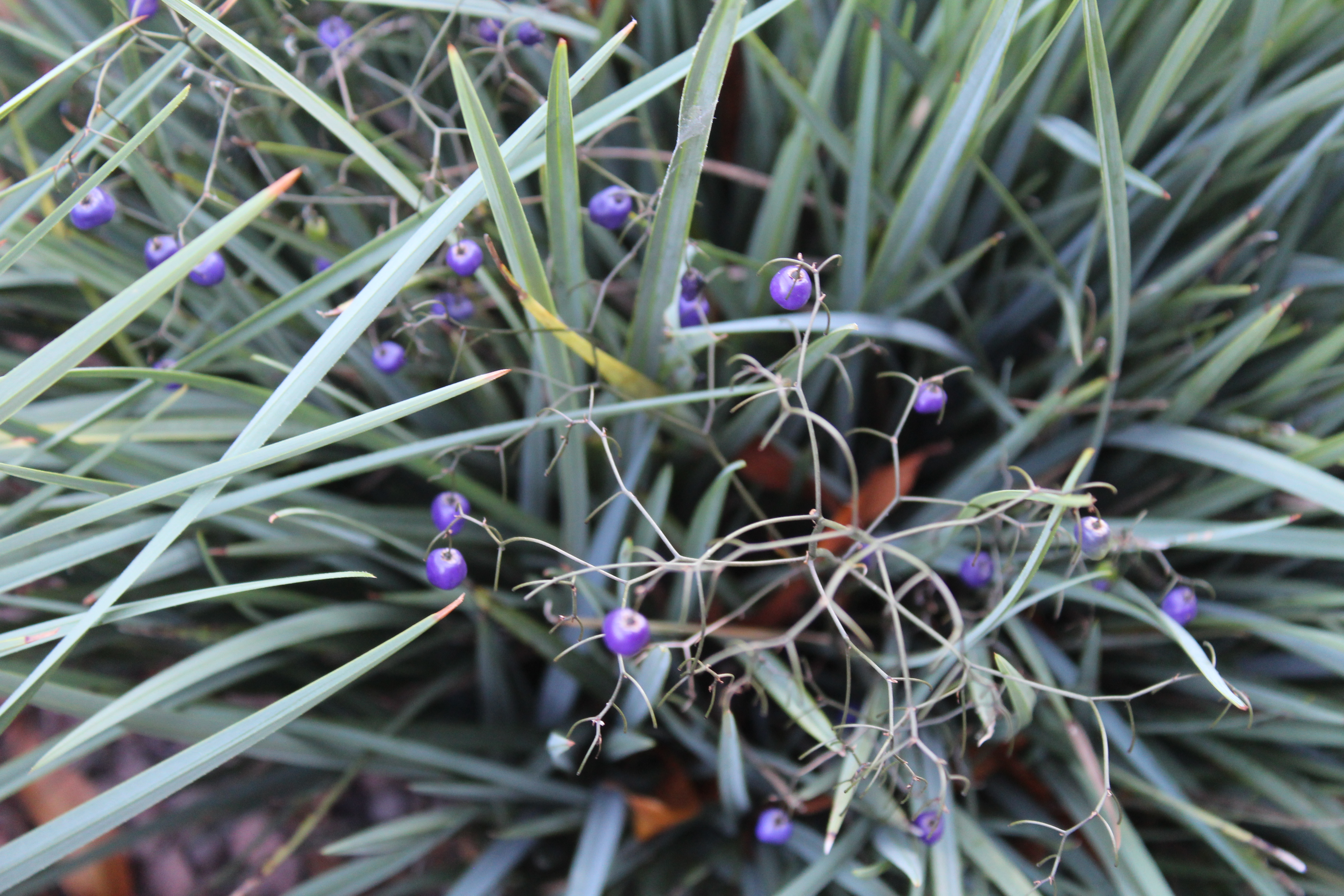
Blue berries on a plant in Kew Gardens

The berry of D. revoluta is reported to be edible.

== Cultural use ==
Dianella, Western Australia was named after this plant, which was plentiful in the area prior to the 1960s residential development.
