= Gatwick Hotel =

Coordinates: 37°51′37″S 144°58′32″E

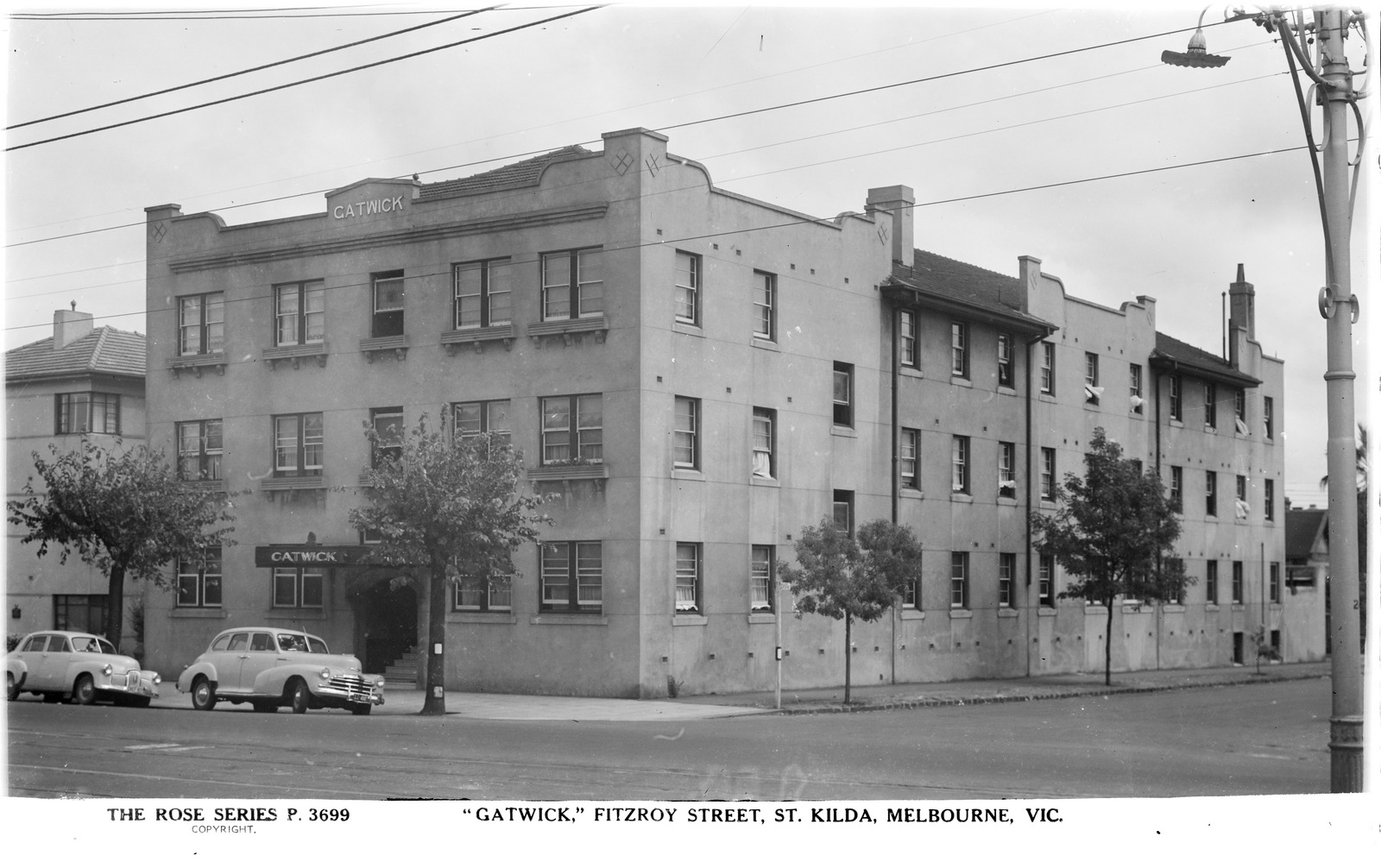
- The Gatwick Hotel c. 1939-1954
- Alternative names: Gatwick Private Hotel

General information
- Location: St Kilda, Victoria, 34 Fitzroy Street, Melbourne
- Opened: 1936
- Renovated: 2018
- Closed: 2017

Design and construction
- Architects: Harry Raymond Johnson (1936); Kosloff Architecture (2022)

The Gatwick Hotel was a hotel in St Kilda, Victoria that would later function as a flophouse before closing in 2017. Originally built in September 1937 as a luxury hotel, it was used as a boarding house from the 1950s, and housed disenfranchised people. In its later years, it earned a reputation for drug use and violent crime. Aside from "The Gat" or "The Gatty", the hotel was known by various nicknames, including "The Ghetto", "Hotel Hell", and "Hotel of Horrors".

The Gatwick closed in 2017, and was sold to Channel 9 to be used for the fourteenth season of renovation reality TV show The Block, where the hotel was converted into luxury apartments. The conversion has been described as "an archetypal example of gentrification", and it being bought by a TV show "sounds like fiction almost."

The legacy of the Gatwick Hotel is contested. Local business owners disliked the bad reputation it gave the area, with many nearby shopfronts vacant at the time of its closure. The former owners of the Gatwick have disputed its reputation. Its residents were overrepresented by marginalized groups, including local LGBT people or Indigenous Australians who may have otherwise ended up homeless. Many former residents have since lived on the street or been jailed because of a lack of replacement housing.

== History ==
=== Opening ===
The Gatwick Private Hotel was built in September 1937 to house navy personal. Advertised as "luxurious", the Spanish Mission-style building was designed by Harry Raymond Johnson, the grandson of architect George Raymond Johnson.

Since the 1950s, the Gatwick has offered low-cost accommodation. The building was bought in 1977 by Maltese immigrants René and Vittoria Carbone, who came to Australia in the 1950s. Vittoria became known as "Queen Vicky" for providing affordable places to live. Her twin daughters Rose Banks and Yvette Kelly began working at the Gatwick at 14, and after Vittoria died in 1998, they bought the hotel to continue providing accommodation.

The sisters were known for their generosity, as they rarely turned anyone away. Despite the hotel's notoriety, one support worker said her clients "described it as a place of last resort — of comfort and non-judgmental available residence." Many were LGBT minorities, Indigenous Australians, and sex workers. As part of the 2014 Victorian state election campaign, the Victorian Labor Party promised to deliver $600,000 to improve the Gatwick.

=== Murder of David Rodakis ===
On February 15, 2010, Neville Morrison and Robert Chaffey attacked David Rodakis outside his room at the Gatwick Hotel. Before the attack, Morrison was reported to have drunk 14 litres of cask wine, and could not remember the attack. Rodakis died 13 days later of pneumonia. Morrison was sentenced to 19 years of jail.

=== Closure ===
In 2015, the hotel was put up for sale. Minister for Housing Martin Foley said the sisters had approached the state government "some time ago" about their intention of selling the house. While they had built strong relationships with the residents, increasing costs and the rise of use in ice, had made running the hotel too difficult. Additionally, they were in their sixties, and nearing retirement. The state government had committed to work with housing agencies to rehouse residents.

Local police wanted the hotel to be handed over to the state government because of the high number of incidents. Between 2015 and 2016, there were 900 police call-outs. Ambulance Victoria reported twenty-one overdoses, ten psychiatric episodes, and seven physical or sexual assaults during a similar time span. Foley stated that "The Gatwick has long passed its time as a place that housed vulnerable people in safe and appropriate circumstances."

=== Sale to Channel 9 ===
After the hotel struggled to find buyers, there were rumours that the hotel was going to be sold to Channel 9 for renovation reality TV show The Block which were finally confirmed in March 2017. The hotel was bought $10 million, while it was originally advertised in December 2015 for between $11 and $12 million. Channel 9 said the purchase was not a stunt for attention, and was instead for the building's location. Their plan was to convert the rooms into eight apartments. After renovations, the apartments sold for between $2.7 and $3.2 million. The former owners Rose Banks and Yvette Kelly bought one of the renovated apartments for themselves for $2.77 million.

After production finished, the part of the ground floor the hotel that had previously been used for Channel 9's production equipment was converted into apartments by Kosloff Architecture. In the 2022 Victorian Architecture Awards, it won an Award for Interior Architecture.

== Legacy ==
The closure of the Gatwick Hotel has been described as "an archetypal example of gentrification." The neighbourhood character of St Kilda has changed significantly as other historic buildings have also been lost or renovated. The Greyhound Hotel was demolished to build an apartment block, and the Oslo Hotel renovated for The Block season 15.

If it wasn't for The Gatwick and the girls, a lot of people would be on the streets still, and a lot of people might be dead.

— Cindy, longtime resident of the Gatwick Hotel, The Saints of St Kilda

Despite many residents finding temporary accommodation after the closure of Gatwick, many were ultimately left homeless. ABC News reported that after the auctions of the renovated apartments were completed in 2018, at least 32 women who lived at the Gatwick had been imprisoned.

The closure of the Gatwick was compared to the conversion of The Regal, which was another boarding house in St Kilda. Rather than apartments, it was converted into accommodation for women over 55, but no additional resources being invested which caused a loss of beds. Compared to public housing, boarding houses do not require referral and allow residents to remain anonymous.

== Documentaries ==
Several documentaries have been produced the Gatwick Hotel and its former owners, Rose Banks and Yvette Kelly.

=== The Saints of St Kilda ===
In 2015, PLGRM released a fifteen minute documentary about Banks and Kelly for free on YouTube. In the documentary, Kelly expresses fear that there will be nowhere else for the residents to go, stating, "They have no compassion, not only not to house them, but to even just look at them or tolerate them."

=== The Gatwick Private Hotel ===
In 2017, the Guardian Australia produced an audio documentary about the Gatwick Hotel by Kristina Kukolja, with accompanying photographs by Sandy Rogulic.

=== Gatwick: The Last Chance Hotel ===
In 2018, the ABC produced a documentary by Jason Bryne about the final four years before the Gatwick Hotel was sold. One reviewer called the documentary "moving", and highlighted a scene where Banks and Kelly appear unfazed as they repair a broken window left bloodied after a suicide attempt. The film was made not-for-profit, and proceeds were donated to Launch Housing.
