= The Block season 17 =

The Block
- Season 17
- No. of episodes: 50

Release
- Original network: Nine Network
- Original release: 8 August – 7 November 2021

Season chronology
- ← Previous; Season 16 Next → Season 18

The seventeenth season of Australian reality television series The Block, titled The Block: Fans v Faves, premiered on 8 August 2021 on the Nine Network. Hosts Scott Cam and Shelley Craft, site foremen Keith Schleiger and Dan Reilly, and judges Neale Whitaker, Shaynna Blaze and Darren Palmer, all returned from the previous season.

== Production ==
Applications for the seventeenth season of the series opened in August 2020 until 27 September 2020, looking for couples aged between 18 and 65 years old being sought by casting agents. Filming is expected to be a 10–12 week shoot period from late February 2021 In September 2020, the seventeenth season of The Block was officially confirmed at Nine's 2021 upfronts. In October 2020, it was reported that 5 properties on Bronte Court in Hampton, Victoria, were in the process of being purchased by Nine. In December 2020, it was confirmed that Bronte Court will be the next location for renovation, Nine Network acquired five houses in the area for $11.5 million combined.

In July 2021, it was officially confirmed the season will be Fans vs Faves, although this is the second time the title Fans vs Faves will be used, this is actually the third season to have returning contestants versus new contestants (seasons 8 & 10 respectively). Season 8 was the first time the series was titled Fans vs Faves.

Mitch & Mark won the series with their house selling for over $4.04m. All houses sold on auction day with all teams profiting well over $295k.

== Contestants ==
This season introduces 3 new couples (dubbed "Fans") and 2 returning couples (dubbed "Favourites"/"Faves"). The couples selected were as follows: Of the new "Fans" Josh & Luke Packham have previously participated on Love Island Australia.

House	Couple		Age	Location	Relationship	Occupations
1	Faves	Georgia & Ronnie Caceres (Note: Former contestants on season 13)	37 & 45	Perth, WA	Married with children	Professional Renovators
2	Faves	Mitch Edwards & Mark McKie (Note: Former contestants on season 15)	58 & 59	Sydney, NSW	Partners	Resigned Grandparents
3	Fans	Tanya & Vito Guccione	39 & 44	Melbourne, VIC	Married with children	Makeup Artist & Window Furnisher
4	Fans	Josh & Luke Packham	both 27	Sydney, NSW	Identical Twins	Studying Mental Health & Synthetic Grass Installer
5	Fans	Kirsty Lee Akers & Jesse Anderson	32 & 31	Wangi Wangi, NSW	Married	Country Singer & Videographer

== Cheating scandal ==
Schedule scandal

Two of the teams — House 3's Tanya and Vito and House 4's Josh and Luke — had a photo of the production schedule, which meant they knew exactly when certain rooms would be called, and the dates of challenge days. Josh and Luke said that they received the photo but wouldn't say from where, and after denials, Tanya and Vito revealed that Tanya had sent the photo to Luke. Tanya said that she received the photo from a former tradesperson on The Block. Having the production schedule was a massive advantage. When the photo was brought to Scott Cam's attention, he wiped the schedule clean and said they would pick rooms at random to complete for the rest of the season. Scott Cam punished Tanya and Vito and Josh and Luke by deducting two points per team, effectively ruling them out from winning Basement Week. There was considerable anger among fans, who thought that this punishment should have been harsher.

In the final episode of the show, during the final interviews, Tanya was questioned about the cheating scandal once again. She again said that she hadn't taken the photograph and showed a text feed between her and a supposed ex-tradie from The Block. Her partner Vito was supporting and also denied the suspicions.

However, House 4's Josh & Luke decided to 'get [the truth] off their chests' and did a full tell-all interview. They explained how during the filming of the promotion, they were using the toilets in the production office (which was another house being rented out by Nine Network). When Luke went to use the bathroom he noticed an open door, which was Scotty's office. The entire production schedule was written on a whiteboard at the back of the room. Luke was only able to memorise the first 3–4 weeks on the schedule but never considered taking a photo. Later in the day, Luke (and possibly Josh) was approached by Tanya, who asked if they could be on guard for her while she took a photo. They reluctantly agreed.

The twins explained that the reason they had kept quiet was because Tanya wasn't willing to say her part in it. During Half Basement Week (the week the scandal was exposed), Josh & Luke came out but Tanya initially did not wish to. Josh and Luke initially kept her identity anonymous because of this reason. They later managed to convince Tanya to come out with her part by implementing the fake ex-tradie story which most people believed.

Josh & Luke also explained that they didn't want to go against Tanya's will because they wouldn't have been able to get several things signed off by them, including a moved driveway and ability to use their property for access so that they could dig their pool.

While the contestants were waiting for their reserves the day before Auctions, they were informed of the twins' story. Ronnie & Georgia and Mitch & Mark had suspected that this had been the case but had never known for sure. When Josh & Luke arrived, Luke apologised for his part in the scandal and this was generally accepted by the other contestants.

While driving to meet the other contestants, Tanya was annoyed at the twins for not informing her that they were going to tell the truth. Her husband Vito responded by saying that he was still on her side and would support her. Tanya got very upset when confronted by other contestants about it, and using Mitch's words, "... it's too late, now she's caught."

Laundry scandal

Because of the schedule scandal, the Block was thrown into disarray because all of the pre booked and planned work had to be restructured. One of these problems was Kinsman, who were booked in to do the laundries during the now Living & Dining Week. The contestants were told that they had to prep their laundries for install by Kinsman as well as doing their living/dining rooms. If they managed to complete this during the week, Kinsman would install for free as they were a sponsor. However, if a team failed to complete it they would have to pay for install during another week. All teams managed to complete it in time except for Tanya & Vito. As per the rules Tanya & Vito were required to pay for their late install, but instead they manipulated Kinsman who agreed to do it for free. However, the other contestants stepped in and caught Tanya & Vito out and made sure they paid for their laundries.

Reaction

Fans were angered by the whole scandal, particularly Tanya's failure to reveal the truth until the final episode. Most fans felt that the punishment should have been much higher, and like suggested by Ronnie, have all points and extra money taken away from the responsible teams. Some fans even felt that the auction results of the two teams should have been changed, mainly Tanya and Vito's.

The producers and casting agents of the show were also brought under fire, fans questioning the choices of Josh & Luke and Tanya & Vito as contestants. Many fans felt that the casting agents should have spotted the bad qualities in the contestants and not cast them. They also questioned the casting of Josh & Luke, as former Love Island contestants many felt that they were cast just to cause drama and as advertising for the show.

Theories

Fans have speculated many theories about the scandal and why Tanya would feel the need to take the photo in the first place. One of these theories is that Tanya may have felt disadvantaged as she was up against a bunch of All Stars.

== Score history ==
Teams' progress summarised through the competition
	Teams				
	Ronnie & Georgia	Mitch & Mark	Tanya & Vito	Josh & Luke	Kirsty & Jesse
Rooms	Scores				
Guest Bedroom	24½	22½	23	24	23
Guest Ensuite	26½	28	24½	20½	24
Master Bedroom & Walk-in-Robe	23½	26½	24	27	23
Basement	28½	28½	25½	19	29
Master Ensuite	29	22	22½	28½	26
Guest Bedroom & Redo Room	29	28	27	20	28½
Kitchen	27	22½	25½	26½	29½
Living & Dining	29½	25	29½	22½	29
Hallway, Laundry & Powder Room	29	26½	25	18½	29½
Backyard	28	28	22½	28	29½
Garage, Study & Wine Cellar	27	23½	19½	8	26½
Front Garden & Facade	27	29½	24	24½	28½
Super Power Leader Board	331½	310	292½	267	326

=== Weekly room budget ===
Week	Room(s)	Budget	Costs				
Week	Room(s)	Budget	Ronnie & Georgia	Mitch & Mark	Tanya & Vito	Josh & Luke	Kirsty & Jesse
1	Guest Bedroom	$21,000	$21,305	$13,823.20	$14,199.98	$20,722.80	$14,757.58
2	Guest Ensuite	$23,000	$24,500	$20,833	$33,237	$25,356	$19,022
3	Master Bedroom & Walk-in-Robe	$22,000	$24,500	$20,376	$25,649	$19,830	$24,920
4	Basement	$25,000	$23,410	$31,795	$32,106	$28,231	$34,117
5	Master Ensuite	$25,000	$22,200	$26,792	$17,458	$41,980	$27,044
6	Guest Bedroom & Redo Room	$21,000 + $5,000	$24,680	$22,461	$15,220	$17,248	$19,855
7	Kitchen	$21,000	$39,396	$33,768	$27,083	$33,024	$49,085
8	Living & Dining	$25,000	$47,001	$37,691	$49,618	$37,367	$47,863
9	Hallway, Laundry & Powder Room	$25,000	$37,418	$25,092	$34,138	$29,504	$44,428
10	Backyard	$35,000	$76,033	$46,425	$45,005	$53,538	$86,411
11	Garage, Study & Wine Cellar	$30,000	-	-	-	-	-
12	Front Garden & Facade	$40,000	-	-	-	-	-

=== Weekly room prize ===
Week	Room	Winning team	Prize
1	Guest Bedroom	Ronnie & Georgia	$10,000 and a getaway to the Mornington Peninsula
2	Guest Ensuite	Mitch & Mark	$10,000 and a getaway to the Lancemore Crossley St. Hotel
3	Master Bedroom & Walk-in-Robe	Josh & Luke	$10,000 and a night away to the Yarra Valley
4	Basement	Kirsty & Jesse	$10,000 + $5,000 for getting a 10 and a night away to the Lancemore Crossley St. Hotel
5	Master Ensuite	Ronnie & Georgia	$10,000 + $5,000 for getting a 10 and a luxury holiday to Lyon House in Ballarat
6	Guest Bedroom & Redo Room	Ronnie & Georgia	$10,000 + $5,000 for getting a 10 and a luxury holiday to Lancemore Werribee Mansion
7	Kitchen	Kirsty & Jesse	$10,000 + $10,000 for getting two 10's and a wall of $100k wine fridges from Gaggenau + a night away to the W Hotel
8	Living & Dining	Ronnie & Georgia	$5,000 each and a night away to Red Hill Polperro Farmhouse; Tanya & Vito gets $10,000 for getting two 10's
8	Living & Dining	Tanya & Vito	$5,000 each and a night away to Red Hill Polperro Farmhouse; Tanya & Vito gets $10,000 for getting two 10's
9	Hallway, Laundry & Powder Room	Kirsty & Jesse	$10,000 + $10,000 for getting two 10's and a night away to Mitchelton estate in an airstream caravan
10	Backyard	Kirsty & Jesse	$10,000
11	Garage, Study & Wine Cellar	Ronnie & Georgia	$10,000 + a one night away holiday to the Yarra Valley
12	Front Garden & Facade	Mitch & Mark	$10,000 and a Ford Puma

== Results ==
=== Judges' scores ===
Colour key:
Highest Score
Lowest Score

Summary of Judges' Scores
Week	Area(s)	Scores	Teams				
Week	Area(s)	Scores	Ronnie & Georgia	Mitch & Mark	Tanya & Vito	Josh & Luke	Kirsty & Jesse
1	Guest Bedroom	Darren	8	8	7½	8½	8½
1	Guest Bedroom	Shaynna	8½	7½	8	8	7
1	Guest Bedroom	Neale	8	7	7½	7½	7½
1	Guest Bedroom	Total	24½	22½	23	24	23
2	Guest Ensuite	Darren	9	9½	8½	7	8
2	Guest Ensuite	Shaynna	8½	9	8	7	8
2	Guest Ensuite	Neale	9	9½	8	6½	8
2	Guest Ensuite	Total	26½	28	24½	20½	24
3	Master Bedroom & Walk-in-Robe	Darren	8	9	9	9	8
3	Master Bedroom & Walk-in-Robe	Shaynna	7½	9	8	9	7½
3	Master Bedroom & Walk-in-Robe	Neale	8	8½	7	9	7½
3	Master Bedroom & Walk-in-Robe	Total	23½	26½	24	27	23
4	Basement	Darren	9½	9	9	7	9½
4	Basement	Shaynna	9½	10	9	7	9½
4	Basement	Neale	9½	9½	9½-2	7-2	10
4	Basement	Total	28½	28½	25½	19	29
5	Master Ensuite	Darren	9	7½	7½	9	8½
5	Master Ensuite	Shaynna	9	7	7½	9½	8½
5	Master Ensuite	Neale	10+1	7½	7½	10	9
5	Master Ensuite	Total	29	22	22½	28½	26
6	Guest Bedroom & Redo Room	Darren	9½	9½	9½	6½	9½
6	Guest Bedroom & Redo Room	Shaynna	10	9	8½	7	9½
6	Guest Bedroom & Redo Room	Neale	9½	9½	9	6½	9½
6	Guest Bedroom & Redo Room	Total	29	28	27	20	28½
7	Kitchen	Darren	9	7½	8½	9	9½
7	Kitchen	Shaynna	9	7½	8	9	10
7	Kitchen	Neale	9	7½	9	8½	10
7	Kitchen	Total	27	22½	25½	26½	29½
8	Living & Dining	Darren	9½	8½	9½	7	9½
8	Living & Dining	Shaynna	9½	8	10	7½	9½
8	Living & Dining	Neale	9½+1	8½	10	8	10
8	Living & Dining	Total	29½	25	29½	22½	29
9	Hallway, Laundry & Powder Room	Darren	9½	9	8½	6	9½
9	Hallway, Laundry & Powder Room	Shaynna	10	8½	8½	6½	10
9	Hallway, Laundry & Powder Room	Neale	9½	9	8	6	10
9	Hallway, Laundry & Powder Room	Total	29	26½	25	18½	29½
10	Backyard	Darren	9½	9	7½	9	9½
10	Backyard	Shaynna	9½	9½	7½	9½	9½
10	Backyard	Neale	9	9½	7½	9½	9½+1
10	Backyard	Total	28	28	22½	28	29½
11	Garage, Study & Wine Cellar	Darren	9	8½	6½	3	8½
11	Garage, Study & Wine Cellar	Shaynna	9	8	6½	3	9
11	Garage, Study & Wine Cellar	Neale	9	7	6½	2	9
11	Garage, Study & Wine Cellar	Total	27	23½	19½	8	26½
12	Front Garden & Facade	Darren	9	9½	8	8	9
12	Front Garden & Facade	Shaynna	9	10	8	8	9½
12	Front Garden & Facade	Neale	9	10	8	8½	10
12	Front Garden & Facade	Total	27	29½	24	24½	28½

=== Challenge scores ===
Summary of challenge scores
Week	Challenge		Reward	Teams				
Week	Challenge	Description	Reward	Ronnie & Georgia	Mitch & Mark	Tanya & Vito	Josh & Luke	Kirsty & Jesse
1	House decider	Complete a bedroom with a budget of $5,000 in 48 hours	First choice of the houses	House 1 (decided by Fans)	House 2 (decided by Fans)	3rd place (House 3)	2nd place (House 4)	1st place (House 5)
3	Bayley House Makeover	Makeover a communal area each on a budget of $7,000	$10,000 split between team members	Lost		Won		
5	Cubby House Challenge	Each team must build the most original Cubby house design	$10,000 and 1 bonus point	Rocket Ship Cubby House	Barbie Cubby House	Jungle Cubby House	Ballpit Cubby House	Cafe Cubby House
6	Shipwrecked Challenge	Create a piece for the guest bedroom using materials from old ships	$10,000 and a Myhome smart system or $10,000 and 1 bonus point	Hanging Shelf	Play Station	Fidget Planter Boxer	Bedside Table	Stool
7	Lip Sync Challenge	Perform and lip sync to a chosen genre of music	$5,000 and 1 bonus point	Pop star: Performing Chandelier by Sia	Boy band: Performing Wake me up before you go-go	Country Legend: Performing Dolly Parton and Kenny Rogers Island in the stream	Musical theatre: Performing the Lion King Hakuna Matata	Rock god : Performing Queen Bohemian Rhapsody
8	Domain listing Challenge	Create a listing for domain	$10,000 and 3 bonus points for Domain Super Power leader board	27½	24½	22½	24	27
10	Domain Buyers Jury challenge	Clean and prepare their houses for domain buyers jury	$10,000 won the money and Kirsty and Jess won the bonus point	31	34	32	27	26
11	Games night Challenge	4 leg race 1.Build a block tower 2.Sketch it 3.Pinning the tool on Scott Cam 4.Complete big blocks puzzle	$5,000	1st	2nd	5th	3rd	4th
11	Glass blowing Challenge	Making glass decanter for wine cellar	1st place:$5,000 2nd place:$3,000 3rd place:$2,000	Triangular decanter	Classic decanter	3rd 60's vibe decanter	2nd Side sitting decanter	1st Rounded decanter

=== Auction ===
Rank	Couple	Reserve	Auction Result	Profit	Total Winnings	Auction Order
1st	Mitch & Mark	$3.4m	$4,044,444.44	$644,444.44	$744,444.44	2nd
2nd	Josh and Luke	$3.4m	$3.93m	$530,000	$530,000	4th
3rd	Tanya and Vito	$3.4m	$3,800,000.01	$400,000.01	$400,000.01	3rd
4th	Kirsty and Jesse	$4.1m	$4,401,523.67	$301,523.67	$301,523.67	5th
5th	Ronnie and Georgia	$3.4m	$3.696m	$296,000	$296,000	1st

== Ratings ==
The Block 2021 metropolitan viewership and nightly position Colour key: – Highest rating during the series – Lowest rating during the series
Week	Episode		Original airdate	Timeslot	Viewers (millions) (Note: Ratings data is from OzTAM and represents the live and same day average viewership from the 5 largest Australian metropolitan centres (Sydney, Melbourne, Brisbane, Perth and Adelaide).)	Nightly rank	Source
1	1	"Welcome to The Block"	8 August 2021	Sunday 7:00pm	0.747	7	
1	2	"Guest Bedrooms Begin"	9 August 2021	Monday 7:30pm	0.627	10	
1	3	"Guest Bedrooms Continue"	10 August 2021	Tuesday 7:30pm	0.634	10	
1	4	"Fans & Faves collide"	11 August 2021	Wednesday 7:30pm	0.633	9	
2	5	"Guest Bedrooms Revealed"	15 August 2021	Sunday 7:00pm	0.758	4	
2	6	"Guest Ensuites Begin"	16 August 2021	Monday 7:30pm	0.619	12	
2	7	"Guest Ensuites Continue"	17 August 2021	Tuesday 7:30pm	0.591	12	
2	8	"Game Changing Surprise"	18 August 2021	Wednesday 7:30pm	0.678	9	
3	9	"Guest Ensuites Revealed"	22 August 2021	Sunday 7:00pm	0.779	4	
3	10	"Master Bedrooms & WIRs Begin"	23 August 2021	Monday 7:30pm	0.627	11	
3	11	"Bayley House Challenge Day"	24 August 2021	Tuesday 7:30pm	0.609	12	
3	12	"Master Bedrooms & WIRs Continue"	25 August 2021	Wednesday 7:30pm	0.668	7	
4	13	"Master Bedroom & WIR Revealed"	29 August 2021	Sunday 7:00pm	0.828	4	
4	14	"Basements Begin"	30 August 2021	Monday 7:30pm	0.809	7	
4	15	"Basements Continue"	31 August 2021	Tuesday 7:30pm	0.911	5	
4	16	"Cheating Scandal Erupts"	1 September 2021	Wednesday 7:30pm	0.941	5	
5	17	"Basements Revealed"	5 September 2021	Sunday 7:00pm	1.032	4	
5	18	"Master Ensuites Begin"	6 September 2021	Monday 7:30pm	0.852	5	
5	19	"Cubby House Challenge"	7 September 2021	Tuesday 7:30pm	0.971	5	
5	20	"Master Ensuites Continue"	8 September 2021	Wednesday 7:30pm	0.834	5	
6	21	"Master Ensuites Revealed"	12 September 2021	Sunday 7:00pm	0.952	5	
6	22	"Guest Bedrooms & Redo Rooms Begin"	13 September 2021	Monday 7:30pm	0.864	5	
6	23	"Shipwrecked Challenge"	14 September 2021	Tuesday 7:30pm	0.829	5	
6	24	"Guest Bedrooms & Redo Rooms Continue"	15 September 2021	Wednesday 7:30pm	0.810	5	
7	25	"Guest Bedrooms & Redo Rooms Revealed"	19 September 2021	Sunday 7:00pm	0.961	3	
7	26	"Kitchens Begin"	20 September 2021	Monday 7:30pm	0.812	5	
7	27	"Lip Sync Challenge"	21 September 2021	Tuesday 7:30pm	0.855	5	
7	28	"Kitchens Continue"	22 September 2021	Wednesday 7:30pm	0.855	5	
8	29	"Kitchens Revealed"	26 September 2021	Sunday 7:00pm	1.074	2	
8	30	"Living & Dinings Begin"	27 September 2021	Monday 7:30pm	0.876	5	
8	31	"Domain Listing Challenge"	28 September 2021	Tuesday 7:30pm	0.840	5	
8	32	"Living & Dinings Continue"	29 September 2021	Wednesday 7:30pm	0.902	5	
9	33	"Living & Dinings Revealed"	4 October 2021	Monday 7:00pm	0.995	3	
9	34	"Hallway, Laundry & Powder Rooms Begin"	5 October 2021	Tuesday 7:30pm	0.893	5	
9	35	"Hallway Week Heats Up"	6 October 2021	Wednesday 7:30pm	0.894	5	
9	36	"Hallway, Laundry & Powder Rooms Continue"	7 October 2021	Thursday 7:30pm	0.849	5	
10	37	"Hallway, Laundry & Powder Room Revealed"	10 October 2021	Sunday 7:00pm	0.920	4	
10	38	"Backyards Begin"	11 October 2021	Monday 7:30pm	0.835	5	
10	39	"Domain Buyers Jury Challenge"	12 October 2021	Tuesday 7:30pm	0.849	5	
10	40	"Backyards Continue"	13 October 2021	Wednesday 7:30pm	0.898	5	
11	41	"Backyards Revealed"	17 October 2021	Sunday 7:00pm	1.064	1	
11	42	"Garage, Study & Wine Cellar Begins"	18 October 2021	Monday 7:30pm	0.956	5	
11	43	"Games night & Glass blowing Challenges"	19 October 2021	Tuesday 7:30pm	0.928	5	
11	44	"Garage, Study & Wine Cellar Continues"	20 October 2021	Wednesday 7:30pm	0.851	5	
12	45	"Garage, Study & Wine Cellar Reveal"	24 October 2021	Sunday 7:00pm	1.100	1	
12	46	"Front Garden & Facade Begins"	25 October 2021	Monday 7:30pm	0.944	4	
12	47	"Front Garden & Facade Continues"	26 October 2021	Tuesday 7:30pm	0.901	3	
12	48	"Front Garden & Facade Final Stretch"	27 October 2021	Wednesday 7:30pm	0.861	3	
13	49	"Front Garden & Facade Reveal"	31 October 2021	Sunday 7:00pm	1.084	1	
13	50	"Grand Final/ Auctions"	7 November 2021	Sunday 7:00pm	1.555	2	
13	50	"Winner Announced"	7 November 2021	Sunday 7:00pm	1.835	1	
