= Dianna Corcoran =

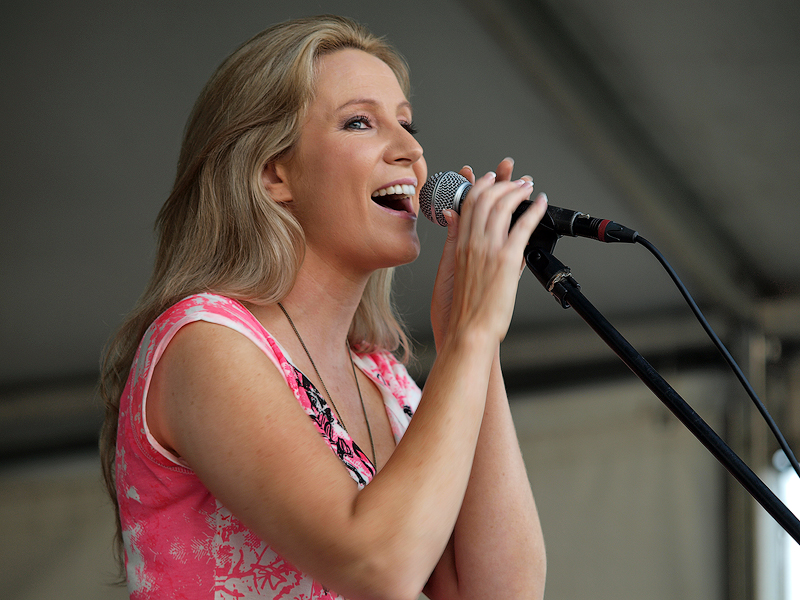
- Corcoran performing in 2010

Background information
- Born: Dianna Elizabeth Corcoran; 20 June 1979 (age 47); Parkes, New South Wales, Australia
- Genre: Country music
- Occupation: Singer-songwriter
- Instruments: Vocals, guitar
- Years active: 2003–present
- Website: diannacorcoran.com

Dianna Elizabeth Corcoran (born 20 June 1979 in Parkes, New South Wales) is an Australian country music singer-songwriter. Among numerous awards, she is a three-time Golden Guitar winner

== History ==
Corcoran's initial interest in country music involved yodelling. After finishing high school, Corcoran moved to Adelaide where she worked in three jobs (recruitment, dog food factory and car parts plant) to save enough money to make her first record (Little Bit Crazy). She became a professional musician in 2004. In that year, she toured with Adam Brand as an opening act. It was also in that year that she won her first Golden Guitar Award for New Talent of the Year.

Corcoran has been deployed on three occasions to perform for Australian troops on active duty in war zones around the world, including a tour of Afghanistan with Jenny Morris. During one such tour to the Solomon Islands in March 2007 she met Tom Hinds, an Australian soldier. Corcoran wrote the song "Come Back Home" on the album Keep Breathing for him. She has written other songs about family and childhood experiences, including her father ("If You Hear Angels"), her mother ("You'll Always Love Me More") and her hometown Parkes ("Rocky Hill").

In 2008, Corcoran won Female Artist of the Year. In August, Corcoran was invited by Deborah Conway to take part in the Broad Festival project, which toured major Australian cities including performing at the Sydney Opera House. With Corcoran and Conway were Laura Jean, Liz Stringer and Elana Stone – they performed their own and each other's songs.

== Discography ==
=== Albums ===
List of studio albums, with Australian positions
Title	Details
Little Bit Crazy	Released: 2004; Label: Compass Brothers
Then There's Me	Released: January 2007; Label: Compass Brothers (031CDCB)
Keep Breathing	Released: 16 January 2010; Label: Dianna Corcoran (DC10003)
In America	Released: 29 January 2016; Label: Compass Brothers

== Awards and nominations ==
Year	Nominee / work	Award	Result
2004	Dianna Corcoran ("I'll Fly Away")	CMAA Country Music Awards – Female Vocalist of the Year	Nominated
2003	Dianna Corcoran ("I'll Fly Away")	Australian Independent Country Music Awards – Rising Star Female	Won
2004	Dianna Corcoran	Australasian Performing Right Association – Professional Development Award	Won
2004	Dianna Corcoran ("I'll Fly Away")	CMAA Country Music Awards – New Talent of the Year	Won
2004	Dianna Corcoran ("I'll Fly Away")	CMAA Country Music Awards – Female Vocalist of the Year	Nominated
2008	Dianna Corcoran (Then There's Me)	CMAA Country Music Awards – Female Artist of the Year	Won
2008	Dianna Corcoran (Then There's Me)	CMAA Country Music Awards – Album of the Year	Nominated
2008	Dianna Corcoran and Karl Broadie ("Count Your Blessings")	CMAA Country Music Awards – Vocal Collaboration of the Year	Nominated
2010	Dianna Corcoran	Australian Independent Country Music Awards – Artist of the Year	Won
2010	Dianna Corcoran ("Thank You For Cheating on Me")	Australian Independent Country Music Awards – Female Vocalist of the Year	Won
2010	Dianna Corcoran ("Thank You For Cheating on Me")	Australian Independent Country Music Awards – Single of the Year	Won
2011	Dianna Corcoran (Keep Breathing)	CMAA Country Music Awards – Album of the Year	Nominated
2011	Dianna Corcoran ("Thank You For Cheating on Me")	CMAA Country Music Awards – Female Artist of the Year	Nominated
2011	Dianna Corcoran ("Thank You For Cheating on Me")	CMAA Country Music Awards – Single of the Year	Nominated
2021	"True Blue" (Amber Lawrence, Aleyce Simmonds, Kirsty Lee Akers and Dianna Corcoran)	CMAA Country Music Awards - Vocal Collaboration of the Year	Won
