= AIR Awards of 2009 =

4th edition of annual Australian music award

- Date: 23 November 2009
- Venue: The Forum Theatre, Melbourne, Australia
- Hosted by: Julian Morrow

Highlights
- Most wins: The Drones (2)
- Website: https://air.org.au/air-awards/

The AIR Awards of 2009 is the fourth annual Australian Independent Record Labels Association Music Awards (generally known as the AIR Awards and Jagermeister AIR Awards) and was an award ceremony at The Forum Theatre, in Melbourne, Australia on 23 November 2009 to recognise outstanding achievements of local artists who release their work through an Australian-owned independent record label and distribute their work through a locally owned distribution firm.

The event was again sponsored by German liquor brand, Jägermeister and was filmed for a one-hour special on Australian pay-TV music broadcaster Channel V. The event was hosted by The Chaser's Julian Morrow.

AIR GM Nick O'Byrne told Billboard the awards are slowly attracting more corporate sponsorship, saying "As far as the awards themselves go, we're developing a history of recognising artists that are yet to hit widespread mainstream success - like Gotye and Hilltop Hoods did in 2006 - or are just starting to blossom like Geoffrey Gurrumul Yunupingu and British India last year and Blue King Brown the year before."

== Nominees and winners ==
=== AIR Awards ===
Winners are listed first and highlighted in boldface; other final nominees are listed alphabetically.

Best Independent Artist of the Year	Best Independent Album
**The Drones**; Bertie Blackman; Dappled Cities; Sia; C.W. Stoneking	**The Drones - Havilah**; Bertie Blackman – Secrets and Lies; Dappled Cities – Zounds; Decoder Ring – They Blind the Stars, and the Wild Team; C.W. Stoneking – Jungle Blues
Best Independent Single/EP	Breakthrough Independent Artist of the Year
**Philadelphia Grand Jury – "Going to the Casino"**; Architecture in Helsinki – "That Beep"; Art vs. Science – Art vs. Science; Bertie Blackman – "Heart"; Sia – "Buttons"	**Bertie Blackman**; Art vs. Science; John Steel Singers; Oh Mercy; Sia
Best Independent Blues and Roots Album	Best Independent Country Album
**C.W. Stoneking – Jungle Blues**; Bonjah – Until Dawn; Ash Grunwald – Fish Out of Water; Carus Thompson – Creature of Habit; The Waifs – Live from the Union of the Soul	**Adam Brand – Hell of a Ride**; Kirsty Lee Akers – Better Days; James Blundell – Portrait of a Man; Tania Kernaghan – Livin' the Dream; Amber Lawrence – The Mile
Best Independent Dance Album	Best Independent Hard Rock or Punk Album
**Art vs. Science - Art vs. Science**	**The Nation Blue – Rising Waters**; The Amity Affliction – Severed Ties; Closure in Moscow – First Temple; I Killed the Prom Queen – Sleepless Nights & City Lights; Mammal – The Majority
Best Independent Hip Hop/Urban Album	Best Independent Jazz Album
**Pez – A Mind of My Own**; Astronomy Class – Pursuit of Happiness; Funkoars – The Hangover; Gully Platoon – The Great Divide; Hermitude – Threads	**The World According to James - Lingua Franca**

== See also ==
- Music of Australia
