= Aleyce Simmonds =

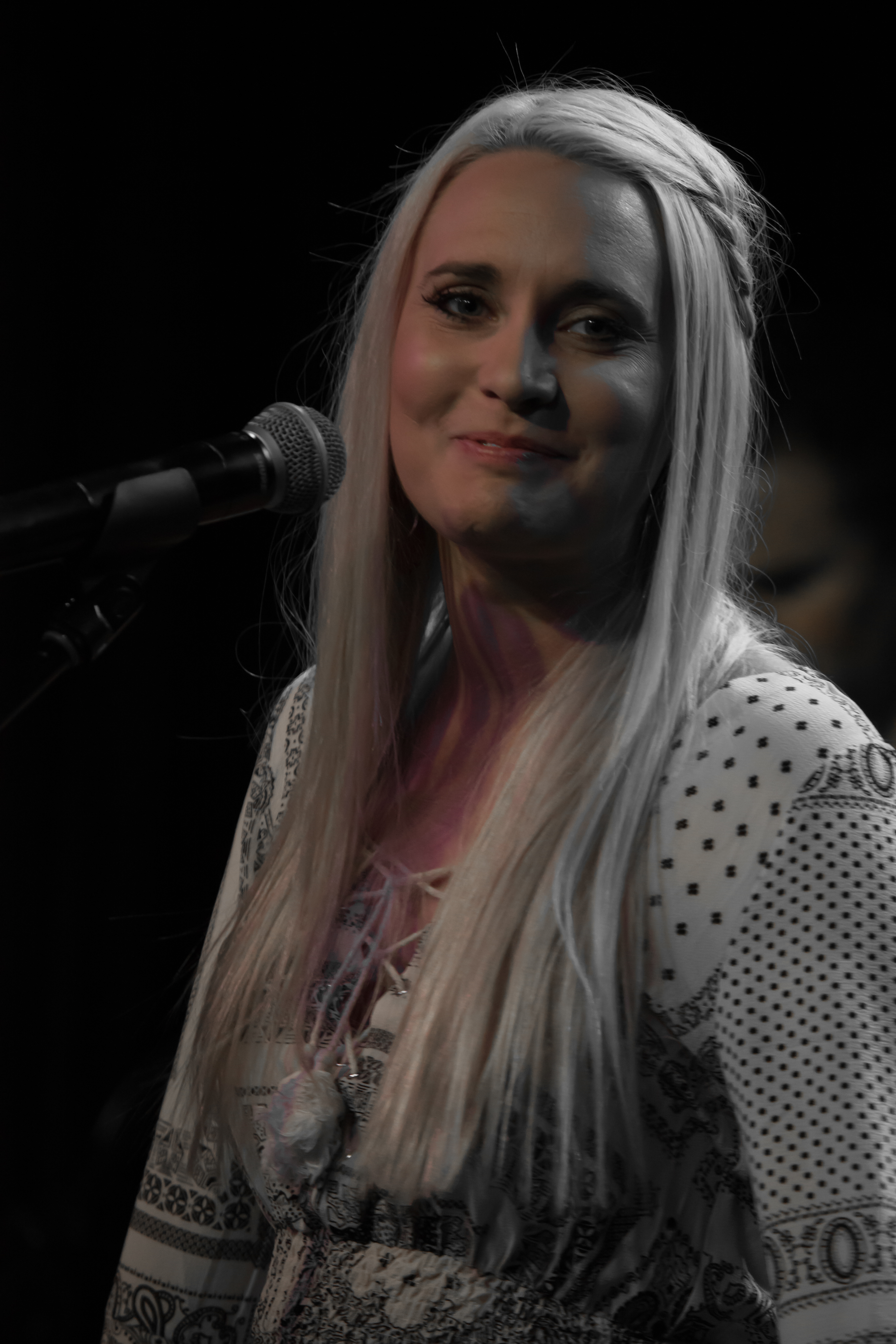
- Aleyce Simmonds in 2016

Background information
- Born: 6 December 1986 (age 39); Port Macquarie, New South Wales, Australia
- Origin: Tamworth, New South Wales, Australia
- Genres: Country, Country pop, Country rock
- Occupation: Singer-songwriter
- Instruments: Vocals, guitar
- Years active: 2001–present
- Labels: Capitol Records Nashville, Sony BMG, Universal Music Australia
- Website: www.aleyce.com

Aleyce Simmonds (born 6 December 1986 in Port Macquarie, New South Wales) is an Australian country music recording artist and singer-songwriter. Simmonds' accolades include the Telstra Road to Tamworth Winner in 2004. As a part of her prize Aleyce visited Nashville and recorded a successful single, "Mighty, Mighty Love". Simmonds also won an APRA Award, in 2017 for Country Work of the Year, with her song "Greatest Companion".

She won Australian and National Duet of the year winner with Paul Costa for "The Way You Make Me Feel" in 2007.

Simmonds received her 7th Golden Guitar (Country Music Awards of Australia) nomination in 2017. In 2014, Simmonds won Female Artist of the Year at the Australian Independent Country Music Awards for 2014. In October 2015, Simmonds was named Australian Independent Artist of the Year, Female Vocalist of the Year and awarded Best Country Single of the Year.

== Music career ==
Simmonds released her debut album in 2011 and four subsequent radio singles and music videos for "The Keeper", "When I Say Too Much", "The Healing Hands of Time" and "Bondwood Boat". All singles except "Bondwood Boat" achieved chart positions inside top 20.

Simmonds was nominated for three Golden Guitar awards at the Country Music awards of Australia, The Healing Hands of Time, written with the album's producer Rod McCormack (Beccy Cole, Adam Harvey, Amber Lawrence, Paul Kelly) being nominated for Female Artist of the Year and New Talent of the Year and "Bondwood Boat" written with Graeme Connors being nominated for Heritage Song of the year. She performed the song with Connors at the Golden Guitars.

Simmonds was a finalist at the 2016 Golden Guitar Awards for APRA AMCOS Song of the Year with her song "Joshua", about her stillborn baby brother. "Joshua" was awarded the No. 1 spot on the 88.9FM Tamworth Country Music Top 20 charts for 2015. Aleyce also secured No. 12 with "It Finds Us Anyway" and No. 14 with "The Greatest Companion" on the local station's countdown.

At the APRA Music Awards of 2017 Simmonds won the category, Country Work of the Year, with her song, "Greatest Companion"; it was inspired by being in the studio with Luke Bona on 2UE. It's about how important overnight radio is to so many people. Aleyce was blown away by the amazing callers Bona receives throughout the night and how important the radio is to them.

== Personal life ==
Aleyce Simmonds was born on 6 December 1986 in Port Macquarie, New South Wales and moved when she was age 12 to Tamworth. At age 13, Aleyce entered her first talent quest but did not win. Then at the age of 16 she entered the Country Capital Music Association's (CCMA) Talent Quest. She was voted the best overall artist under the age of 16 and won $1,000, with which she brought her first guitar. She started writing songs and found she had a natural country sound, and by age 15 she was playing gigs in pubs around Tamworth. While Simmonds still tours regularly, she is currently living on her parents' hundred-acre property outside of Tamworth, where she spends weekdays writing songs before hitting the road to tour on the weekends.

Simmonds is the host for BalconyTV Tamworth. An online music show that features bands, musicians and other variety acts on balconies around the world. Tamworth is the only city in Australia that is not a Capital City that has BalconyTV. It is in association with the Tamworth Country Music Festival.

== Discography ==
=== Studio albums ===
List of studio albums, with Australian positions
Title	Details	Peak chart positions
Title	Details	AUS
Pieces of Me	Released: January 2011; Label: Aleyce Simmonds; Formats: CD, DD	-
Believe	Released: September 2013; Label: Aleyce Simmonds; Formats: CD, DD	-
More Than Meets the Eye	Released: January 2017; Label: Aleyce Simmonds; Formats: CD, DD, streaming	25
Here & Now	Released: 17 January 2020; Label: Aleyce Simmonds; Formats: CD, DD, streaming	64

== Awards ==
=== APRA Awards ===
The APRA Awards are held in Australia and New Zealand by the Australasian Performing Right Association to recognise songwriting skills, sales and airplay performance by its members annually.

Year	Nominee / work	Award	Result
2017	"Greatest Companion"	Country Work of the Year	Won

=== Country Music Awards of Australia ===
The Country Music Awards of Australia (CMAA) (also known as the Golden Guitar Awards) is an annual awards night held in January during the Tamworth Country Music Festival, celebrating recording excellence in the Australian country music industry. They have been held annually since 1973.

Year	Nominee / work	Award	Result
2018	More Than Meets the Eye	Female Artist of the Year	Won
2021	"True Blue" (with Amber Lawrence, Kirsty Lee Akers and Dianna Corcoran)	Vocal Collaboration of the Year	Won

- Note: wins only
