= Amber Lawrence =

Australian country music singer-songwriter (born 1978)

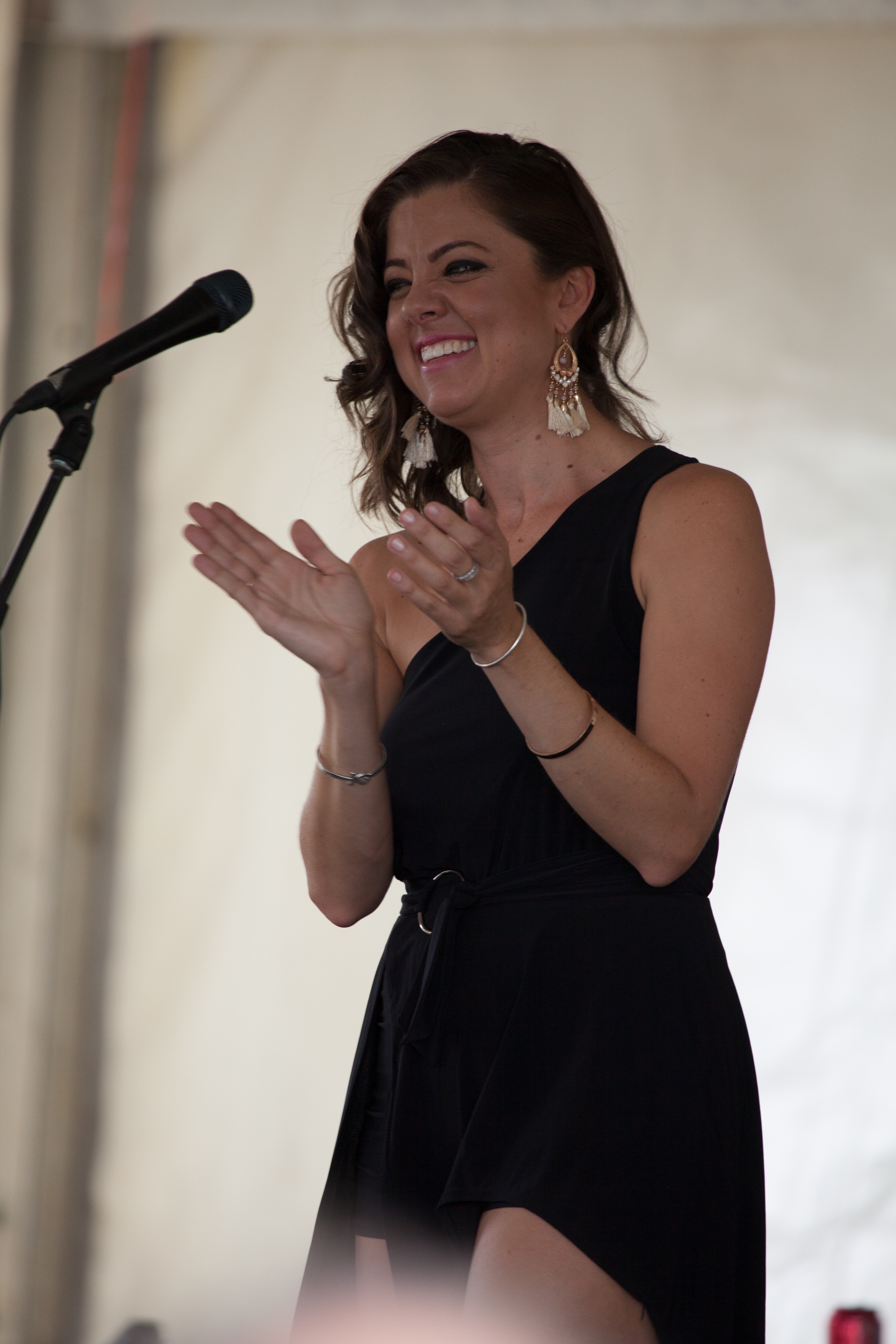
- Amber Lawrence, Penrith, March 2016

Background information
- Born: Amber Louise Lawrence; 19 April 1978 (age 48); Sydney, New South Wales, Australia
- Genres: Australian country; children's
- Occupation: Musician
- Instruments: Guitar; vocals
- Years active: 2003–present
- Labels: ABC; Universal; Core/Sony
- Website: amberlawrence.com.au

Amber Louise Lawrence (born 19 April 1978) is an Australian country music singer-songwriter-guitarist. Five of her studio albums have reached the ARIA Albums Chart top 50, 3 (2012), Superheroes (2014), Happy Ever After (2016), Our Backyard (2017) and Spark (2019, No. 13). At the Country Music Awards of Australia Lawrence has won six Golden Guitar trophies.

Lawrence has performed and is featured at many of the leading country music festivals, such as Gympie Muster, CMC Rocks The Hunter and QLD, Mildura Music Festival, Deni Ute Muster, Caboolture, Mudbulls & Music and Derwent Valley Muster. She has toured with the likes of Lee Kernaghan, The McClymonts, Adam Harvey, Melinda Schneider, Sunny Cowgirls, and Kaylens Rain, and event tours such as Chic Frontier.

Over the years, Lawrence has also been a supporter of Australia's military, performing for the troops both abroad and at various events around the country. In 2007, she played in East Timor, and in 2013, she was in the Sinai, entertaining Australian and coalition forces. Her song "Man Across The Street" is about a returned veteran; it resulted in her 2013 Golden Guitar nomination for "Best Female Artist of the Year".

== Personal life ==
Amber Louise Lawrence was born on 19 April 1978. She grew up in the Sydney suburb of Mascot with two siblings. Her father, Brian Lawrence, was a surf lifesaver at South Maroubra club until he had a stroke at age 40. When a toddler, Lawrence wandered onto the busy road in front of her home and was saved from serious injury by a neighbour. She attended Our Lady of the Sacred Heart College, Sydney where she completed the Higher School Certificate in 1995, including a place in the Order of Merit List. She excelled at athletics and tried out for the state team.

After graduating from the University of New South Wales with a commerce degree and working for six years as a chartered accountant for Qantas, Lawrence became a full-time musician. She had started guitar lessons from the age of 22. Brian Lawrence died in September 2008, aged 52, after being diagnosed with leukaemia.

Lawrence met marketer Martin Newman via a dating app in 2016. On Christmas Day 2017, Lawrence and Newman were engaged at Coogee Beach, and in August 2018 the couple had a child. On 2 May 2019 they married in Port Douglas, Queensland.

After a chance encounter at an airport in 2017, a unique opportunity presented itself when Lawrence was invited to perform in New York for an event commemorating the 75th Anniversary Battle of the Coral Sea with the American Association. The audience was made up of surviving war veterans, then-Australian prime minister Malcolm Turnbull, then-President of the United States of America, Barack Obama, and Donald Trump among others. Lawrence performed the poignant "100 Year Handshake" which she wrote especially for the event with her now-husband Martin Newman.

In 2019, Lawrence was invited to perform as part of Vision Australia's Carols by Candlelight, broadcast live annually on Christmas Eve from the Sidney Myer Music Bowl in Melbourne, Australia.

On 13 December 2025 Lawrence joined a range of high-profile performers at the 81st annual St John Ambulance Carols by Candlelight, a free open-air spectacular held at Elder Park in central Adelaide, South Australia. About 15,000 people attended. The event was televised live across Australia by the Seven Network and is available for replay on 7+.

Lawrence is also a mentor to young artists in the Australian Music industry and has provided free entertainment and mentoring in over 300 schools Australia wide, as part of her 'Be Your Own Superhero' program.

Lawrence is the face of iHeartRadio Australia Country, hosting the show each week, a guest presenter on Channel 9's 'Getaway' and was the co-host of the CMC Music Awards in 2017 – live on Foxtel, and the 2019 Golden Guitar Awards. Lawrence was also extremely honored to receive an Australia Day Bronze Achievement Award for her contribution to War Veterans and their families, via her work with RSL DefenceCare.

From February 2022 to 23 April 2022, Lawrence hosted ABC Radio's Saturday Night Country national show, temporarily replacing regular host Beccy Cole.

== Music career ==
=== 2003–2006: Career beginnings and I've Got the Blues ===
In January 2003, Lawrence started busking in Tamworth ahead of its annual country music festival although she has said that "I had no idea what Tamworth was about." She was still working as an accountant, "It wasn't really a conscious decision for me to become a country singer." Returning in 2004, she entered the Road to Tamworth competition and finished second behind Jessica Mauboy. Also that year she attended the College of Country Music, where she met fellow aspiring country singer Travis Collins. The singer-songwriter was one of nine grand finalists for the Star Maker Quest at the 2005 Country Music Awards of Australia (CMAA), but lost to Samantha McClymont.

In January 2006, Lawrence independently released her debut four-track extended play, I've Got the Blues. It was produced by Matt Fell and reached the ARIA singles chart top 100.

=== 2007–2011: The Mile and When It All Comes Down ===
Lawrence's debut studio album, The Mile, was released in July 2007 and was again produced by McCormack. The title track relates to Sam McRae, a "16-year-old jockey" who "died in a racing accident". The album reached No. 13 on the ARIA Country Albums chart.

At the 2008 CMAA, she was nominated for "Female Artist of the Year" and "New Talent", and in the following year she was nominated for "Female Artist of the Year", "APRA Song of the Year" and "Video Clip of the Year". She received a nomination for "Country Work of the Year" for The Mile's single, "Good Girls" at the APRA Music Awards of 2009. At the AIR Awards of 2009, The Mile was nominated for Independent Country Album of the Year.

Her second studio album, When It All Comes Down, was released in August 2009. It reached No. 17 on the ARIA Country Albums chart and No. 16 on the related Hitseekers Albums chart. Two of its tracks, "Always Kiss Me Goodnight" and "The Good Men" were in honour of her father, Brian, who had died in the previous year. Susan Jarvis of Capital News observed it was, "at the same time intensely personal and universally relevant. The songs — all Amber originals — are catchy, powerful and full of feeling."

In 2010 she won "Female Vocalist of the Year" at the Victorian National Country Music Awards (sponsored by the Whittlesea Country Music Festival), and was nominated for "Best Independent Country Album" at the Independent Country Music Awards (sponsored by the Mildura Country Music Festival). At the 2010 CMAA, When It All Comes Down was nominated for three categories.

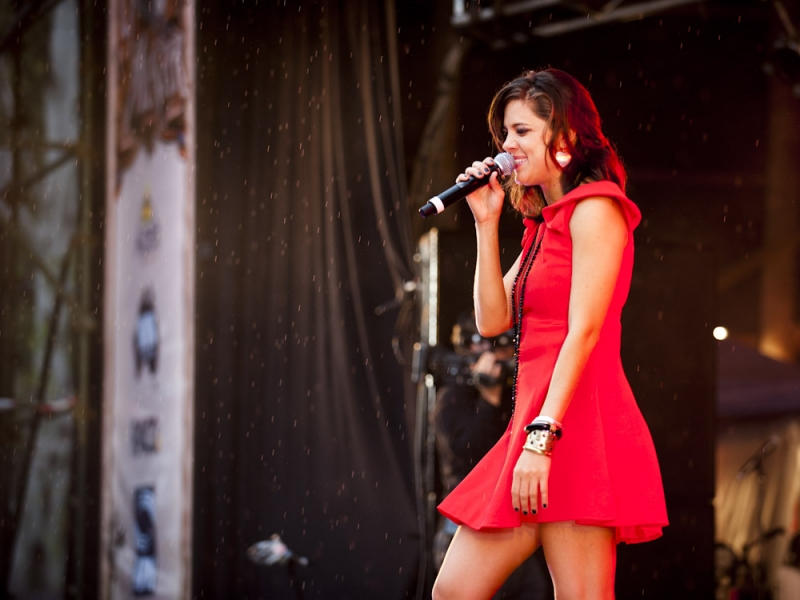
Lawrence performing in 2011

=== 2012–2015: 3 and Superheroes ===
The simply named 3, her third studio album, was released in January 2012 via Core Music/Sony Music Entertainment, which peaked in the ARIA Albums top 50 and reached No. 4 on the Country Albums chart. Its second single, "The Man Across the Street", relates to the experiences of her neighbour, Bill and other Vietnam Veterans. On 5 March, 3, was named Album of the Week at 98.9 FM, with their reviewer explaining, "its mixture of upbeat optimism, personal happiness and resilience along with some references to deeper issues including courage in the face of hardship, is another step upward on a sharply-angled career path that has seen [her] delight audiences all over the country." In both 2012 and 2013, Lawrence was again nominated for CMAA's "Female Artist of the Year". In 2014, Lawrence was nominated for "Female Artist of the Year" at the Australian Club Entertainment Awards.

In September 2014, Lawrence released her fourth studio album, Superheroes. It also reached the ARIA top 50, while debuting at No. 3 on the Country Albums chart. The CD's artwork includes a photo of her parents in their surfing era at Maroubra Beach, where they met. Dave Dawson of Nu Country observes that the album has her, "reeling from a relationship break-up and depression, sings of being her own superhero in the title track, name checking Wonder Woman, Spider Man and Iron Man." In 2015, Lawrence was awarded the CMAA's Golden Guitar trophy for Best Female Artist of the Year, the Australian Bush Laureate Award for Contemporary Song Lyric of the Year and was nominated for Heritage Song of the Year, both for "The Lifesaver". The song details her family's response to Brian's stroke in 1996. She was also named CMC Music Video Channel's Female Oz Artist of the Year.

=== 2016–2018: The Kid's Gone Country, Happy Ever After and Our Backyard ===
In April 2016, Lawrence released her fifth studio album, The Kid's Gone Country, her first children's albums. This was followed in September 2016 with her sixth, Happy Ever After, which reached the ARIA top 50 and Country Albums No. 6. Sunburnt Country Music's Sophie Hamley noticed that "[it's] full of well-crafted country pop that will delight ... she writes and sings from an authentic place, and she is unabashed about showing sentiment and emotion. You get the sense that in conversation she wouldn't be one for small talk – she would want to get right to the heart of a matter."

Her collaboration with fellow Australian country artist Travis Collins, the seven-track Our Backyard EP, was released in August 2017. It peaked at No. 40 on the ARIA Albums chart and No. 2 on the Country Albums chart. The title track was co-written by Lawrence, Collins and Matt Scullion. The EP was produced by Matt Fell. Jeremy Sollars of Southern Free Times found it, "Brimming with classics that tell quintessentially Australian stories, the music and lyrics ... reflect the true Australian experience across life, love and friendship." At the 2018 CMAA she won three Golden Guitar trophies: Vocal Collaboration of the Year (shared with Collins), Song of the Year (shared with Collins and Scullion) and Single of the Year (shared with Collins), all for "Our Backyard".

In November 2017, Lawrence released her second children's album, Aussie Aussie Christmas.

=== 2019–present: Spark and Living for the Highlights ===
In June 2019, Lawrence's released her eighth studio album, Spark, which peaked at No. 13 on the ARIA Albums chart and No. 1 on the Country Albums chart. It was produced by Stuart Stuart.

In 2020, Lawrence appeared as a featured artist on Jayne Denham's single "Porch Party", alongside Jasmine Rae.

In July 2022, Lawrence released her tenth studio album, Living for the Highlights, which peaked at number 5 on the ARIA Charts. Living for the Highlights received an ARIA nomination for Best Country Album in 2022.

Her eighth studio album Suburban Cowgirl was released on 29 May 2026, alongside a debut children's book of the same name.

== Discography ==
=== Studio albums ===
List of studio albums, with peak chart positions
Title	Album details	Peak chart positions
Title	Album details	AUS
The Mile	Released: 7 July 2007; Label: Amber Lawrence, ABC Music, MRA (MR60542); Formats: CD, Digital download	—
When It All Comes Down	Released: 24 August 2009; Label: Amber Lawrence, ABC, MGM (AL2); Formats: CD, Digital download	—
3	Released: 20 January 2012; Label: Amber Lawrence, ABC, Core Music/Sony Music Entertainment Australia (COREALA01); Formats: CD, Digital download	41
Superheroes	Released: 15 September 2014; Label: Amber Lawrence, ABC, Social Family Records (SFR)/EMI Records (SFR0021); Formats: CD, Digital download	43
The Kid's Gone Country	Released: 9 May 2016; Label: Social Family Records (SFR) (SFR0048); Formats: CD, Digital download	88
Happy Ever After	Released: 26 September 2016; Label: Amber Lawrence, ABC, Social Family Records (SFR)/Universal Music Australia (SFR0054); Formats: CD, Digital download, streaming	44
Aussie Aussie Christmas (Re-released in 2023 as A Very Aussie Aussie Christmas)	Released: 13 November 2017; Label: ABC, Universal Music Australia (6713315); Formats: CD, Digital download, streaming	—
Spark	Released: 10 June 2019; Label: Amber Lawrence, ABC, Universal Music Australia (7755602); Formats: CD, Digital download, streaming	13
The Kid's Gone Country II: Fun for All the Family	Released: November 2020; Label: UMA, ABC; Formats: CD, digital download, streaming	71
Living for the Highlights	Released: 22 July 2022; Label: UMA, ABC; Formats: CD, digital download, streaming	5
Suburban Cowgirl	Released: 29 May 2026; Label: ABC; Formats: CD, digital download, streaming	18

=== Live albums ===
List of live albums, with selected details
Title	Album details	Peak chart positions
Title	Album details	AUS Country
Hometown Girl	Released: 5 October 2015; Label: Amber Lawrence, ABC, Social Family Records (SFR)/EMI (ALLIVE001); Formats: CD, Digital download	7

=== Extended plays ===
List of EPs, with selected details and chart positions
Title	EP details	Peak chart positions	
Title	EP details	AUS	AUS Country
I've Got the Blues	Released: 16 January 2006; Label: Amber Lawrence OSE (ALCD001); Formats: CD, digital download	84	—
Our Backyard (with Travis Collins)	Released: 2 August 2017; Label: ABC/UMA (5780098); Formats: CD, digital download, streaming	40	2

== Awards and nominations ==
=== AIR Awards ===
The Australian Independent Record Awards (known colloquially as the AIR Awards) is an annual awards night to recognise, promote and celebrate the success of Australia's Independent Music sector.

Year	Nominee / work	Award	Result	Ref.
2009	The Mile	Best Independent Country Album	Nominated	
2010	When It All Comes Down	Best Independent Country Album	Nominated	
2015	Superheroes	Best Independent Country Album	Nominated	
2021	Kids Gone Country - Fun for All the Family	Best Independent Children's Album or EP	Nominated	
2024	A Very Aussie Aussie Christmas	Best Independent Children's Album or EP	Nominated	

=== ARIA Music Awards ===
The ARIA Music Awards is an annual ceremony presented by Australian Recording Industry Association (ARIA), which recognise excellence, innovation, and achievement across all genres of the music of Australia. They commenced in 1987.

Year	Nominee / work	Award	Result	Ref.
2021	The Kid's Gone Country 2: Fun for All the Family	Best Children's Album	Nominated	
2022	Living for the Highlights	Best Country Album	Nominated	

=== Country Music Awards of Australia ===
The Country Music Awards of Australia (CMAA) (also known as the Golden Guitar Awards) is an annual awards night held in January during the Tamworth Country Music Festival, celebrating recording excellence in the Australian country music industry. They have been held annually since 1973.

Year	Nominee / work	Award	Result (wins only)
2015	Amber Lawrence	Female Artist of the Year	Won
2018	"Our Backyard" (Travis Collins & Amber Lawrence)	Vocal Collaboration of the Year	Won
2018	"Our Backyard" (Travis Collins & Amber Lawrence)	APRA AMCOS Song of the Year	Won
2018	"Our Backyard" (Travis Collins & Amber Lawrence)	Single of the Year	Won
2021	"True Blue" (Amber Lawrence, Aleyce Simmonds, Kirsty Lee Akers and Dianna Corcoran)	Vocal Collaboration of the Year	Won
2023	Amber Lawrence	Female Vocalist of the Year	Won
