= Kirsty Lee Akers =

Australian country singer-songwriter

- Born: Australia
- Genres: Country
- Occupation: Singer-songwriter
- Instrument: Vocals
- Years active: 2007–present
- Labels: Compass Bros., Sony Music Australia, Social Family Records
- Website: kirstyleeakers.com

Kirsty Lee Akers (born 1990) is an Australian country singer-songwriter.

== Career ==
Akers performed in public for the first time at the age of three years and recorded her first EP in 2006, at the age of 16. She funded that recording with the money she made busking on the streets of Tamworth, New South Wales. Akers graduated from the CMAA Academy of Country Music.

In 2007, at the age of 18, Akers won the Star Maker Award at the Tamworth Country Music Festival and signed her first record deal and released her debut studio album, Little Things the same year. Akers reflected saying, "I used to write my own songs but I had maybe one original song on my first album which was really strange for me at the time because I only ever sang my own songs, but the label [Compass Bros.] at the time wanted me to record different songs, and when I look back now I wish I had that support to record my own music."

In 2010, Akers cut ties with Compass Bros. and released music independently. Her third album Naked was released in April 2011 and was nominated for 3 Golden Guitar Awards - Best Female Artist, Best Music Video, and Best Vocal Collaboration.

In early 2015, Akers signed a new deal with Maven/Sony Music Australia and in April 2016, released Burn Baby Burn.

In July 2018, Akers released Under My Skin which peaked at number 29 on the ARIA Charts.

In 2021, Akers competed on the seventeenth season of television series The Block with her husband Jesse Anderson.

In April 2022, Akers released her sixth studio album, and first on her own label, Rider Records, which she launched in 2021 with husband Jesse Anderson and manager Perrin Finlay-Brown. The album debuted at number 11 on the ARIA Charts.

== Discography ==
List of studio albums, with release date and label shown
Title	Album details	Peak chart positions
Title	Album details	AUS
Little Things	Released: 2007; Label: Compass Bros. (037CDCB); Formats: CD, digital download	
Better Days	Released: 2009; Label: Compass Bros.; Formats: CD, digital download	
Naked	Released: April 2011; Label: Kirsty Lee Akers; Formats: CD, digital download	
Burn Baby Burn	Released: April 2016; Label: Sony Music Australia (88875198632); Formats: CD, digital download	
Under My Skin	Released: 27 July 2018; Label: Social Family Records (SFR0077); Formats: CD, digital download	29
Wild	Released: 15 April 2022; Label: Rider Records (RR00001; Formats: CD, digital download	11

== Awards and nominations ==
=== AIR Awards ===
The Australian Independent Record Awards (commonly known informally as AIR Awards) is an annual awards night to recognise, promote and celebrate the success of Australia's Independent Music sector.

Year	Nominee / work	Award	Result	Ref.
2009	Better Days	Best Independent Country Album	Nominated	

=== APRA Awards ===
The APRA Awards are held in Australia and New Zealand by the Australasian Performing Right Association to recognise songwriting skills, sales and airplay performance by its members annually.

Year	Nominee / work	Award	Result	Ref.
2017	"Burn Baby Burn" (Kirsty Lee Akers, Trey Bruce)	Country Work of the Year	Nominated	

=== CMA Awards ===
The Country Music Awards of Australia is an annual awards night held in January during the Tamworth Country Music Festival, celebrating recording excellence in the Australian country music industry.

Year	Nominee / work	Award	Result (wins only)
2007	Kirsty Lee Akers	Star Maker Award	Won
2008	"Little Things" by Kirsty Lee Akers	Maton New Talent of the Year	Won
2021	"True Blue" (with Amber Lawrence, Aleyce Simmonds and Dianna Corcoran	Vocal Collaboration of the Year	Won
