= The Block season 14 =

The Block
- Season 14
- No. of episodes: 47

Release
- Original network: Nine Network
- Original release: 5 August – 28 October 2018

Season chronology
- ← Previous; Season 13 Next → Season 15

The fourteenth season of Australian reality television series The Block premiered on August 5, 2018, on the Nine Network. Hosts Scott Cam and Shelley Craft, site foreman Keith Schleiger with Dan Reilly, and judges Neale Whitaker, Shaynna Blaze and Darren Palmer, all returned from the previous season, with special guests William Schirripa and Roshan Abraham.

== Production ==
In June 2017, The Block producers lodged renovation plans for The Gatwick Hotel with Port Phillip City Council. In October 2017, the fourteenth season and location of The Block were officially confirmed at Nine's upfronts.

Applications for the fourteenth season of the series opened in August 2017 until 10 September 2017, looking for couples aged between 18 and 65 years old being sought by casting agents. Filming for the season was originally slated to occur between January 2018 and April 2018, however filming didn't begin until early February.

== Contestants ==
This is the sixth season of The Block to have five couples instead of the traditional four couples.

Apt	Couple	Age	Location	Relationship	Occupations
1	Kerrie & Spence Thomson	48 & 46	Barossa Valley, SA	Married	Nurse & Owner Builder
2	Hans & Courtney Baumgartner	37 & 33	Perth, WA	Engaged	Pilot & Flight Attendant
3	Hayden & Sara Vale	45 & 31	Bondi, NSW	Newlyweds	Construction project manager & stay-at-home mum
4	Norm Hogan & Jess Eva	40 & 33	Sunshine Coast, QLD	Engaged with children	Builder & Breakfast Radio Host
5	Bianca Chatfield & Carla Dziwoki	35 & 35	Melbourne, VIC	Best Friends	Ex-Professional Netballers

== Score history ==
Teams' progress through the competition
	Teams				
	Kerrie & Spence	Hans & Courtney	Hayden & Sara	Norm & Jess	Bianca & Carla
Rooms	Scores				
Main Bathroom	22½	25½	21½	24½	25
1st Guest Bedroom	23	25½	22½	24½	26
Master Ensuite	27½	24	22	23	27
Master Bedroom and Walk-in Robe	24	22	26½	22½	22½
Living and Dining	25	27½	23	25	27
Kitchen	30	24	28½	26½	26½
Hallway, Laundry, Powder Room	29	24	18	25	27½
2nd Guest Bedroom & Re-do Room	26	25	26	27½	28½
Terrace	25	23½	28½	30	29
Challenge Apartment: Week 1	20½	28½	27½	20	23½
Challenge Apartment: Week 2	28½	29	27	26½	21½
Auction Order	1st	5th	2nd	3rd	4th
Auction Result	2nd	3rd	1st	5th	4th

=== Weekly Room Prize ===
Week	Room	Winning team	Prize
1	Main Bathroom	Hans & Courtney	$10,000
2	1st Guest Bedroom	Bianca & Carla	$10,000
3	Master Ensuite	Kerri & Spence	$10,000
4	Master Bedroom and Walk-in Robe	Hayden & Sara	$10,000
5	Living and Dining	Hans & Courtney	$10,000
6	Kitchen	Kerrie & Spence	$10,000
7	Hallway, Laundry & Powder Room	Kerrie & Spence	$10,000
8	2nd Guest Bedroom & Re-do Room	Bianca & Carla	$10,000
9	Terrace	Norm & Jess	$10,000 personal prize money

=== Challenge Apartment ===
Week 10
Score Rank	Room 1		Prize
Score Rank	Team	Room	Prize
1	Hans & Courtney	2nd Guest Bedroom	$20,000
2	Hayden & Sara	Main Bathroom	$15,000
3	Bianca & Carla	Master Ensuite	$10,000
4	Kerrie & Spence	1st Guest Bedroom	$0
5	Norm & Jess	Master Bedroom	$0
Week 11
Score Rank	Room 2		Prize
Score Rank	Team	Room	Prize
1	Hans & Courtney	Kitchen	$20,000
2	Kerrie & Spence	Terrace	$15,000
3	Hayden & Sara	Hallway, Study, Laundry & WC	$10,000
4	Norm & Jess	Dining	$0
5	Bianca & Carla	Living	$0

== Results ==
=== Judges' scores ===
Colour key:
Highest Score
Lowest Score

Summary of judges' scores
Week	Area(s)	Scores	Teams				
Week	Area(s)	Scores	Kerrie & Spence	Hans & Courtney	Hayden & Sara	Norm & Jess	Bianca & Carla
1	Main Bathroom	Darren	7½	8½	8	8½	8½
1	Main Bathroom	Shaynna	7	8½	6½	8	8½
1	Main Bathroom	Neale	8	8½	7	8	8
1	Main Bathroom	Total	22½	25½	21½	24½	25
2	Guest Bedroom	Darren	8	9	7½	8½	9
2	Guest Bedroom	Shaynna	7½	8	7½	8	8½
2	Guest Bedroom	Neale	7½	8½	7½	8	8½
2	Guest Bedroom	Total	23	25½	22½	24½	26
3	Master Ensuite	John^{[c]}	8½	8	7½	8	8½
3	Master Ensuite	Shaynna	9	7½	7	7	9
3	Master Ensuite	Neale	9	8½	7½	8	9½
3	Master Ensuite	Total	27½^{[d]}	24	22	23	27
4	Master Bedroom and Walk-in Robe	Darren	8½	8	9	8½	7½
4	Master Bedroom and Walk-in Robe	Shaynna	7½	7	9	6½	7½
4	Master Bedroom and Walk-in Robe	Neale	8	7	8½	7½	7½
4	Master Bedroom and Walk-in Robe	Total	24	22	26½	22½	22½
5	Living and Dining	Darren	8	9	8	9½	9
5	Living and Dining	Shaynna	8½	9½	7½	6½	9
5	Living and Dining	Neale	8½	9	7½	9	9
5	Living and Dining	Total	25	27½	23	25	27
6	Kitchen	Darren	10	8	9½	9	8½
6	Kitchen	Shaynna	10	7½	9½	8	8½
6	Kitchen	Neale	10	8½	9½	9½	9½
6	Kitchen	Total	30	24	28½	26½	26½
7	Hallway, Laundry & Powder Room	Darren	9½	8	6½	8	9½
7	Hallway, Laundry & Powder Room	Shaynna	9½	7½	5	8	9
7	Hallway, Laundry & Powder Room	Neale	10	8½	6½	9	9
7	Hallway, Laundry & Powder Room	Total	29	24	18	25	27½
8	2nd Guest Bedroom & Re-do Room ^{[f]}	Darren	8½	8	9	9	9½
8	2nd Guest Bedroom & Re-do Room ^{[f]}	Shaynna	8½	8	8	9½	9½
8	2nd Guest Bedroom & Re-do Room ^{[f]}	Neale	9	9	9	9	9½
8	2nd Guest Bedroom & Re-do Room ^{[f]}	Total	26	25	26	27½	28½
9	Terrace	Darren	8½	8½	9½	10	9½
9	Terrace	Shaynna	8	7½	9½	10	9½
9	Terrace	Neale	8½	7½	9½	10	10
9	Terrace	Total	25	23½	28½	30	29
10	Challenge Apartment: Week 1	Darren	7	9½	8½	6½	8
10	Challenge Apartment: Week 1	Shaynna	6½	9½	9½	6½	8
10	Challenge Apartment: Week 1	Neale	7	9½	9½	7	7½
10	Challenge Apartment: Week 1	Total	20½	28½	27½	20	23½
11	Challenge Apartment: Week 2	Darren	9½	9½	9	9	7
11	Challenge Apartment: Week 2	Shaynna	9½	9½	9	9	7½
11	Challenge Apartment: Week 2	Neale	9½	10	9	8½	7
11	Challenge Apartment: Week 2	Total	28½	29	27	26½	21½

=== Challenge scores ===
Summary of challenge scores
Week	Challenge		Reward	Teams				
Week	Challenge	Description	Reward	Kerrie & Spence	Hans & Courtney	Hayden & Sara	Norm & Jess	Bianca & Carla
1	The 48-Hour Challenge	Renovate and style a kids bedroom	Pick which apartment they want	Apartment 1 (2nd)^{[b]}	Apartment 2 (5th)	Apartment 3 (1st)	Apartment 4 (4th)	Apartment 5 (3rd)
2	Style to Sell Challenge	Style a room to ready a house for auction	$5000	Study	Living room	Upstairs bedroom	Downstairs bedroom	Dining room
3	Kids Undercover Challenge	Makeover a Kids Undercover studio for at-risk youths	$5000	1st	—	—	—	—
4	Caravan Challenge	Renovate and style a caravan in 70s theme	$5000 & 1 Bonus Point	—	—	—	1st	—
5	Ronald McDonald House Challenge	Style a room for families with sick children	$5000	Didn't participate^{[e]}	1st	—	—	—
6	Steel Sculpture Challenge	Design and make a sculpture for the terraces	$5000	—	—	1st	—	—
7	Youfoodz Cooking Challenge	Create a meal for 50 people and sell it to the public	$5000 and meal added to Youfoodz menu	—	—	—	1st	—
8	Suncorp Challenge	Fling bags of cash into their team bucket.	Potentially $25,000	—	$14000	$10000	$1000	—

=== Domain Prize ===
Each week during the weekly walkthrough, Alice Stolz from Domain will judge each team's current room. She judges each room on suitability, continuity and flow, functionality, progress & budget. The weekly winner will be awarded a $10,000 weekly prize that is split equally in cash and marketing with domain. Each week the points are tallied and the team at the end with the highest score will have themselves and their property featured on the cover of Domain Magazine.

	Teams				
	Kerrie & Spence	Hans & Courtney	Hayden & Sara	Norm & Jess	Bianca & Carla
Rooms	Scores				
Main Bathroom	6	6	6½	8	7½
Guest Bedroom	6	6	6	7	8
Master Ensuite	7	7½	8	6½	6½
Master Bedroom and Walk-in Robe	8½	8	8	9	8½
Living and Dining	8½	7	6½	9	8
Kitchen	7	6½	6½	6½	6½
Hallway, Laundry & Powder Room	8½	9	8½	8	8½
2nd Guest Bedroom	8	7½	7½	8	8½
Terrace ^{[g]}	N/A ^{[g]}	N/A ^{[g]}	N/A ^{[g]}	N/A ^{[g]}	N/A ^{[g]}
Running Total	59½	57½	57½	62 ^{[g]}	62

=== Auction ===
Rank	Couple	Reserve	Auction Result	Profit	Total Winnings	Auction Order	Bought by
1	Hayden & Sara	$2.475m	$3.020m	$545,000	$645,000	2nd	Nicole
2	Kerrie & Spence	$2.435m	$2.850m	$415,000	$415,000	1st	Greville
3	Hans & Courtney	$2.360m	$2.770m	$410,000	$410,000	5th	Greville
4	Bianca & Carla	$2.690m	$2.991m	$301,000	$301,000	4th	Greville
5	Norm & Jess	$2.650m	$2.859m	$209,000	$209,000	3rd	Greville

== Ratings ==
The Block 2018 metropolitan viewership and nightly position Colour key: – Highest rating during the series – Lowest rating during the series
Week	Episode		Original airdate	Timeslot	Viewers (millions)^{[a]}	Nightly rank^{[a]}	Source
1	1	"Welcome to the Gatwick"	5 August 2018	Sunday 7:00pm	1.163	1	
1	2	"48 Hour Challenge"	6 August 2018	Monday 7:30pm	1.135	2	
1	3	"Main Bathroom Week"	7 August 2018	Tuesday 7:30pm	0.921	5	
1	4	"Main Bathroom Week Continues"	8 August 2018	Wednesday 7:30pm	0.920	5	
2	5	"Main Bathroom Reveals"	12 August 2018	Sunday 7:00pm	1.192	2	
2	6	"Guest Bedroom Week Begins"	13 August 2018	Monday 7:30pm	0.961	5	
2	7	"Style to Sell Challenge"	14 August 2018	Tuesday 7:30pm	0.918	4	
2	8	"Guest Bedroom Week Continues"	15 August 2018	Wednesday 7:30pm	0.823	6	
3	9	"Guest Bedroom Reveals"	19 August 2018	Sunday 7:00pm	1.119	1	
3	10	"Master Ensuite Begins"	20 August 2018	Monday 7:30pm	1.013	3	
3	11	"Kids Undercover Challenge"	21 August 2018	Tuesday 7:30pm	0.952	3	
3	12	"Master Ensuite Continues"	22 August 2018	Wednesday 7:30pm	0.901	5	
4	13	"Master Ensuite Reveals"	26 August 2018	Sunday 7:00pm	1.293	1	
4	14	"Master Bedroom and Walk-in Robe Begins"	27 August 2018	Monday 7:30pm	1.088	1	
4	15	"Caravan Challenge"	28 August 2018	Tuesday 7:30pm	1.015	1	
4	16	"Master Bedroom and Walk-in Robe Continues"	29 August 2018	Wednesday 7:30pm	0.846	6	
5	17	"Master Bedroom and Walk-in Robe Reveals"	2 September 2018	Sunday 7:00pm	1.234	1	
5	18	"Living and Dining Begins"	3 September 2018	Monday 7:30pm	1.068	1	
5	19	"Living and Dining Continues"	4 September 2018	Tuesday 7:30pm	1.027	1	
5	20	"Ronald McDonald House Challenge"	5 September 2018	Wednesday 7:30pm	0.980	2	
6	21	"Living and Dining Reveals"	9 September 2018	Sunday 7:00pm	1.296	1	
6	22	"Kitchen Begins"	10 September 2018	Monday 7:30pm	1.046	2	
6	23	"Steel Sculpture Challenge"	11 September 2018	Tuesday 7:30pm	0.987	1	
6	24	"Kitchen Continues"	12 September 2018	Wednesday 7:30pm	0.870	6	
7	25	"Kitchen Reveals"	16 September 2018	Sunday 7:00pm	1.341	1	
7	26	"Hallway, Laundry & Powder Room Begins"	17 September 2018	Monday 7:30pm	1.092	1	
7	27	"Hallway, Laundry & Powder Room Continues"	18 September 2018	Tuesday 7:30pm	0.983	2	
7	28	"Youfoodz Cooking Challenge"	19 September 2018	Wednesday 7:30pm	0.881	5	
8	29	"Hallway, Laundry & Powder Room Reveals"	23 September 2018	Sunday 7:00pm	1.263	1	
8	30	"2nd Guest Bedroom & Re-Do Room begins"	24 September 2018	Monday 7:30pm	0.962	4	
8	31	"Suncorp Challenge"	25 September 2018	Tuesday 7:30pm	0.978	1	
8	32	"2nd Guest Bed and Re-do Room Continues"	26 September 2018	Wednesday 7:30pm	0.928	4	
9	33	"2nd Guest Bed and Re-do Room Reveals"	1 October 2018	Monday 7:30pm	1.166	1	
9	34	"Terrace Week Begins"	2 October 2018	Tuesday 7:30pm	0.960	2	
9	35	"Terrace Week Continues"	3 October 2018	Wednesday 7:30pm	0.926	3	
9	36	"Volkswagen Challenge"	4 October 2018	Thursday 7:30pm	0.784	8	
10	37	"Terrace Reveals"	7 October 2018	Sunday 7:00pm	1.139	1	
10	38	"Challenge Apartment Week 1 Begins"	8 October 2018	Monday 7:30pm	1.035	1	
10	39	"Challenge Apartment Week 1 Continues"	9 October 2018	Tuesday 7:30pm	0.929	3	
10	40	"Challenge Apartment Week 1 Continues"	10 October 2018	Wednesday 7:30pm	0.918	3	
11	41	"Challenge Apartment Week 1 Reveals"	14 October 2018	Sunday 7:00pm	1.155	1	
11	42	"Challenge Apartment Week 2 Begins"	15 October 2018	Monday 7:30pm	1.003	3	
11	43	"Challenge Apartment Week 2 Continues"	16 October 2018	Tuesday 7:30pm	1.017	1	
11	44	"Challenge Apartment Week 2 Continues"	17 October 2018	Wednesday 7:30pm	0.921	3	
12	45	"Challenge Apartment Week 2 Reveals"	21 October 2018	Sunday 7:00pm	1.192	1	
12	46	"Open for Inspections"	22 October 2018	Monday 7:30pm	0.945	3	
13	47	"Grand Final/ Auctions"	28 October 2018	Sunday 7:00 pm	1.674	2	
13	47	"Winner Announced"	28 October 2018	Sunday 7:00 pm	1.865	1	

== Notes ==
- ^{a} Ratings data is from OzTAM and represents the live and same day average viewership from the 5 largest Australian metropolitan centres (Sydney, Melbourne, Brisbane, Perth and Adelaide).
- ^{b} In Apartment 1 resided a secret vault of which the contents were unknown until it was opened. Whoever selected Apartment 1 (Kerrie & Spence) were able to open it and take ownership of the contents within. The vault contained a 1 point gnome, $10,000 Suncorp budget card, $5,000 TV Mirror voucher, $50,000 Sub Zero voucher, $50,000 Gaggenau voucher, $6,300 Reece voucher, $15,000 Freedom Furniture voucher, $10,000 Beacon Lighting voucher, and a Domain Masterclass for feedback and advice on their apartment.
- ^{c} Real Estate Agent, John McGrath, filled in Darren Palmer during week three's Master Ensuite judging reveal.
- ^{d} Kerrie and Spence originally scored 26½ for their Master Ensuite, but used the bonus point they received as part of the safe in week one. Their score was changed to 27½, which gave them a half point overall win over Bianca and Carla.
- ^{e} Kerrie and Spence called a body corporate meeting to skip this challenge due to issues they were having back at the block. The challenge guest judges, Ronnie & Georgia Caceres, took their place and styled the 5th room.
- During the buyer's advocate walk through judging, Norm and Jess decided to use their bonus point and win by 1 1/2 points with 27 1/2 points over Bianca and Carla. They then walk away the $10,000 price.
- ^{f} Along with creating their 2nd Guest Bedroom, each contestant were given $5000 from Suncorp to re-do their worst room. These were their re-do rooms:
  Kerrie & Spence - Living & Dining
  Courtney & Hans - Master Bedroom
  Hayden & Sara - 1st Guest Bedroom
  Norm & Jess - Living & Dining
  Bianca & Carla - Master Bedroom

Weekly judge Shaynna Blaze, chose Norm & Jess’ re-done Living & Dining area as the best re-do. This won them $10,000 to go towards their build.

- ^{[g]} The individual scores for Terrace week's Domain prize was not revealed, however Norm & Jess were announced winners of this week's Domain prize. As they were tied with Bianca and Carla for first place the previous week, this means that they won the overall prize; the cover of Domain magazine.
