= The Block season 16 =

The Block
- Season 16
- No. of episodes: 50

Release
- Original network: Nine Network
- Original release: 23 August – 22 November 2020

Season chronology
- ← Previous; Season 15 Next → Season 17

The sixteenth season of Australian reality television series The Block premiered on 23 August 2020 on the Nine Network. Hosts Scott Cam and Shelley Craft, site foremen Keith Schleiger and Dan Reilly, and judges Neale Whitaker, Shaynna Blaze and Darren Palmer, all returned from the previous season.

== Production ==
In July 2019, it was reported by the Herald Sun that The Block and Channel 9 had acquired a vacant block of land in the exclusive bayside suburb of Brighton on 360 New Street, Brighton. Newly renovated houses are expected to be built on the land in 2020 for the 16th season of the Block.

Applications for the sixteenth season of the series opened in August 2019 until 15 September 2019, looking for couples aged between 18 and 65 years old being sought by casting agents. Filming for the season is slated to begin in late January 2020.

In October 2019, the sixteenth season and location of The Block were officially confirmed at Nine's upfronts.

In March 2020, the season was suspended due to the COVID-19 pandemic in Australia and the potential risk it could cause to the crew, workers and contestants. After more than a month of suspension, the season resumed production on 4 May 2020 with extra safety precautions set in place.

Due to the health and safety standards caused by COVID-19, The Block’s open for inspection will be a virtual experience which took place on 9Now on Monday, 16 November 2020. The Block auctions (or Block-tions) for the houses were held on Saturday, 21 November 2020, with the final episode of 2020 airing the next day on Channel Nine and 9Now at 7:00pm (AEDT) on Sunday, 22 November 2020.

Jimmy and Tam won the series with their house selling for over $4.2m. All houses sold on auction day with all teams profiting well over $400k.

== Contestants ==
This is the eighth season of The Block to have five couples instead of the traditional four couples.

House	Couple	Age	Location	Relationship	Occupations
1	Harry & Tash Pavlou	57 & 32	Melbourne, VIC	Father & Daughter	IT Manager & Social Media Project Manager
2	Sarah & George Bragias	27 & 33	Sydney, NSW	Married, expecting their first child	Teacher & Electrical worker
3	Daniel & Jade Joyce	35 & 35	Wandearah, SA	Married with children	Farmer & Hairdresser
4	Luke & Jasmin Neuwen	35 & 36	Perth, WA	Married with children	Chippy & Teacher
5	Jimmy & Tam Wilkins	33 & 31	Brisbane, QLD	Married with children	Plumber & Bar Manager

== Score history ==
Teams' progress through the competition
	Teams				
	Harry & Tash	Sarah & George	Daniel & Jade	Luke & Jasmin	Jimmy & Tam
Rooms	Scores				
Guest Bedroom	24	21	25	20½	25½
Guest Ensuite	21½	27	23	25½	28½
Master Bedroom & Walk-in-Robe	25½	23	25	25	21½
Master Ensuite	28½	28½	28	29	29^{[c]}
Guest Bedroom & Bathroom	23½	29	25½	30	29
Kitchen	29	28	29½ ^{[d]}	28	29
Living & Dining	28½	25	28	24½	21½
Upstairs	28	28½	27½	26	25½
Stairway, Hallway & Laundry	25	25	25	28½	29^{[f]}
Front Garden & Facade	26	29	28	28	29
Studio & Garage	20	29½	25½	25½	29
Backyard	22½	30	24	29½	27½
Total points^{[b]}	302	323½	314	320	324
Auction Order	5th	3rd	4th	1st	2nd
Auction Result	3rd	2nd	5th	4th	1st

=== Weekly Room Budget ===
Weekly Room Budget
Week	Room(s)	Budget	Costs				
Week	Room(s)	Budget	Harry & Tash	Sarah & George	Daniel & Jade	Luke & Jasmin	Jimmy & Tam
1	Guest Bedroom	$19,000	$14,150	$15,100	$15,700	$17,150	$14,250
2	Guest Ensuite	$22,000	$18,600	$20,000	$24,900	$25,300	$15,700
3	Master Bedroom & Walk-in-Robe	$19,000	$20,200	$25,000	$21,800	$20,200	$32,700
4	Master Ensuite	$24,000	$28,450	$21,700	$27,500	$24,500	$18,950
5	Guest Bedroom & Bathroom	$36,000	$30,200	$35,800	$37,700	$27,400	$27,000
6	Kitchen	$18,000	$23,474	$20,860	$16,284	$22,922	$31,316
7	Living & Dining	$18,000	$33,120	$17,387	$24,685	$18,946	$20,555
8	Upstairs	$21,000	$21,627	$21,777	$25,192	$23,500	$30,987
9	Stairway, Hallway & Laundry	$35,000	$48,470	$42,635	$35,961	$44,714	$47,240
10	Front Garden & Facade	$25,000	$41,986	$40,089	$25,811	$32,365	$51,696
11	Studio & Garage	$35,000	$29,800	$40,000	$45,400	$42,700	$42,700
12	Backyard	$40,000	—	—	—	—	—

=== Weekly Room Prize ===
Week	Room	Winning team	Prize
1	Guest Bedroom	Jimmy & Tam	$10,000 & $120,000 worth of Gaggenau kitchen appliances
2	Guest Ensuite	Jimmy & Tam	$10,000
3	Master Bedroom & Walk-in-Robe	Harry & Tash	$10,000
4	Master Ensuite	Luke & Jasmin	$10,000 split ($5,000 each)
4	Master Ensuite	Jimmy & Tam	$10,000 split ($5,000 each)
5	Guest Bedroom & Bathroom	Luke & Jasmin	$10,000
6	Kitchen	Daniel & Jade	$10,000
7	Living & Dining	Harry & Tash	$10,000 & a Mustang for a week
8	Upstairs	Sarah & George	$10,000
9	Stairway, Hallway & Laundry	Jimmy & Tam	$10,000
10	Front Garden & Facade	Sarah & George	$10,000 split ($5,000 each)
10	Front Garden & Facade	Jimmy & Tam	$10,000 split ($5,000 each)
11	Studio & Garage	Sarah & George	$10,000
12	Backyard	Sarah & George	Ford Puma

== Results ==
=== Judges' Scores ===
Colour key:
Highest Score
Lowest Score

Summary of Judges' Scores
Week	Area(s)	Scores	Teams				
Week	Area(s)	Scores	Harry & Tash	Sarah & George	Daniel & Jade	Luke & Jasmin	Jimmy & Tam
1	Guest Bedroom	Darren	8½	7	9	8	9
1	Guest Bedroom	Shaynna	8	7	8	6	8
1	Guest Bedroom	Neale	7½	7	8	6½	8½
1	Guest Bedroom	Total	24	21	25	20½	25½
2	Guest Ensuite	Darren	7½	9	8½	9	9½
2	Guest Ensuite	Shaynna	6½	9	7	8½	9½
2	Guest Ensuite	Neale	7½	9	7½	8	9½
2	Guest Ensuite	Total	21½	27	23	25½	28½
3	Master Bedroom & Walk-in-Robe	Darren	8½	8	8½	8½	7
3	Master Bedroom & Walk-in-Robe	Shaynna	8½	7½	8½	8½	7
3	Master Bedroom & Walk-in-Robe	Neale	8½	7½	8	8	7½
3	Master Bedroom & Walk-in-Robe	Total	25½	23	25	25	21½
4	Master Ensuite	Darren	9½	9½	9½	10	9½
4	Master Ensuite	Shaynna	9½	9	9½	9½	9½
4	Master Ensuite	Neale	9½	10	9	9½	9
4	Master Ensuite	Total	28½	28½	28	29	29^{[c]}
5	Guest Bedroom & Bathroom	Darren	7	9½	8½	10	10
5	Guest Bedroom & Bathroom	Shaynna	7½	9½	8½	10	9½
5	Guest Bedroom & Bathroom	Neale	9	10	8½	10	9½
5	Guest Bedroom & Bathroom	Total	23½	29	25½	30	29
6	Kitchen	Darren	9½	9½	9½	9½	9½
6	Kitchen	Shaynna	9½	9	9½	9	10
6	Kitchen	Neale	10	9½	9½	9½	9½
6	Kitchen	Total	29	28	29½^{[d]}	28	29
7	Living & Dining	Darren	9½	8½	10	8½	7
7	Living & Dining	Shaynna	9½	8	9	8	7½
7	Living & Dining	Neale	9½	8½	9	8	7
7	Living & Dining	Total	28½	25	28	24½	21½
8	Upstairs^{[e]}	Darren	9½	9½	9½	9	8½
8	Upstairs^{[e]}	Shaynna	9½	9½	9	8½	8½
8	Upstairs^{[e]}	Neale	9	9½	9	8½	8½
8	Upstairs^{[e]}	Total	28	28½	27½	26	25½
9	Stairway, Hallway & Laundry	Darren	9	8½	9½	9½	9½
9	Stairway, Hallway & Laundry	Shaynna	8	8	7½	9½	9½
9	Stairway, Hallway & Laundry	Neale	8	8½	8	9½	9
9	Stairway, Hallway & Laundry	Total	25	25	25	28½	29^{[f]}
10	Front Garden & Facade	Darren	8½	10	9½	9½	9½
10	Front Garden & Facade	Shaynna	8	9½	9	9½	9½
10	Front Garden & Facade	Neale	9½	9½	9½	9	10
10	Front Garden & Facade	Total	26	29	28	28	29
11	Studio & Garage	Darren	6½	9½	8½	8½	10
11	Studio & Garage	Shaynna	7	10	8½	8½	9½
11	Studio & Garage	Neale	6½	10	8½	8½	9½
11	Studio & Garage	Total	20	29½	25½	25½	29
12	Backyard	Darren	7½	10	8	9½	9
12	Backyard	Shaynna	7½	10	8	10	9
12	Backyard	Neale	7½	10	8	10	9½
12	Backyard	Total	22½	30	24	29½	27½

=== Challenge scores ===
Summary of challenge scores
Week	Challenge		Reward	Teams				
Week	Challenge	Description	Reward	Harry & Tash	Sarah & George	Daniel & Jade	Luke & Jasmin	Jimmy & Tam
1	Beach Boxes Challenge	Create a similar Melbourne Brighton Beach Boxes structure which will become their bedroom for the week	First choice of the houses	House 1 (1920s) (5th)	House 2 (1940s) (4th)	House 3 (1930s) (2nd)	House 4 (1910s) (3rd)	House 5 (1950s) (1st)
3	Block It In Challenge	Pick the closest to the correct price of the home the agent take them through	Agent for their house auction	Marty from Whitefox	Pete from The Agency	David from Belle property	Harley from Buxton	Michael from McGrath
3	Block It In Challenge	Guess the value (or closest to it) of one of India's most expensive family home valued at $1 billion.	$5,000 and a bonus point	Guess: Below $100 million	Guess: Below $100 million	Guess: Below $100 million	Guess: $177 million	Guess: $403 million
6	Pottery Challenge	create a specific item of pottery which must feature in their kitchens on reveal day.	$5,000 and a bonus point	Fruit Bowl	Condiment Dish	Sugar Bowl & Jug (1st)	Tea Cup & Saucer	Utensil Holder
7	Property Challenge	Present their properties in a PowerPoint presentation to 3 real estate executives	$5,000	25½	23½	26	25½	26½ (1st)
8	LEGO Dream House Challenge	Build their dream house out of LEGO	$10,000, a bonus point and a smart home system worth $10,000	–	–	–	–	1st
9	Contestant Portrait Challenge	2019 contestants create portraits of the 2020 contestants	$10,000	–	1st	–	–	–
10	Sell in Style Team Challenge	In 2 teams, each must furnish and style an apartment	$20,000 (split between teams)	–	–	1st ($6,666)	1st ($6,666)	1st ($6,666)
11	Re-upholstery Challenge	Re-upholster an old chair which must be used in their studio apartment	$5,000	1st	–	–	–	–
11	Moo-sical Chairs	Last contestant standing in musical chairs wins	$5,000	–	–	1st	–	–
12	Pub Trivia Challenge	Guess correctly the most trivia questions	1st: $3,000, 2nd: $2,000, 3rd: $1,000	2nd	–	–	1st	3rd

=== Auction ===
Rank	Couple	Reserve	Auction Result	Profit	Total Winnings	Auction Order
1st	Jimmy & Tam	$3.290m	$4,256,000	$966,000	$1,066,000^{[g]}	2
2nd	Sarah & George	$3.350m	$4,000,002	$650,002	$650,002	3
3rd	Harry & Tash	$3.350m	$4m	$650,000	$650,000	5
4th	Luke & Jasmin	$3.350m	$3.856m	$506,000	$506,000	1
5th	Daniel & Jade	$3.340m	$3.8m	$460,000	$460,000	4

== Ratings ==
The Block 2020 metropolitan viewership and nightly position Colour key: – Highest rating during the series – Lowest rating during the series
Week	Episode		Original airdate	Timeslot	Viewers (millions)^{[a]}	Nightly rank^{[a]}	Source
1	1	"Welcome to The Block"	23 August 2020	Sunday 7:00pm	0.947	3	
1	2	"Guest Bedrooms Begin"	24 August 2020	Monday 7:30pm	0.738	8	
1	3	"Guest Bedrooms Continue"	25 August 2020	Tuesday 7:30pm	0.762	8	
2	4	"Guest Bedrooms Revealed" "Room Winners Announced"	30 August 2020	Sunday 7:00pm	0.943 1.016	4 3	
2	5	"Guest Ensuites Begin"	31 August 2020	Monday 7:30pm	0.744	9	
2	6	"Guest Ensuites Continue"	1 September 2020	Tuesday 7:30pm	0.692	8	
2	7	"Guest Ensuites Walk Arounds"	2 September 2020	Wednesday 7:30pm	0.651	7	
3	8	"Guest Ensuites Revealed" "Room Winners Announced"	6 September 2020	Sunday 7:00pm	0.924 0.985	4 3	
3	9	"Master Bedrooms & WIRs Begin"	7 September 2020	Monday 7:30pm	0.789	6	
3	10	"Block It In Challenge"	8 September 2020	Tuesday 7:30pm	0.753	5	
3	11	"Master Bedrooms & WIRs Continue"	9 September 2020	Wednesday 7:30pm	0.687	7	
4	12	"Master Bedrooms & WIRs Revealed" "Room Winners Announced"	13 September 2020	Sunday 7:00pm	0.960 0.991	4 3	
4	13	"Master Ensuites Begin"	14 September 2020	Monday 7:30pm	0.791	7	
4	14	"Master Ensuites Continue"	15 September 2020	Tuesday 7:30pm	0.821	5	
4	15	"Master Ensuite Walk Arounds"	16 September 2020	Wednesday 7:30pm	0.742	7	
5	16	"Master Ensuites Revealed" "Room Winners Announced"	20 September 2020	Sunday 7:00pm	0.987 1.029	4 2	
5	17	"Guest Bedroom & Bathrooms Begin"	21 September 2020	Monday 7:30pm	0.885	5	
5	18	"Guest Bedroom & Bathrooms Continue"	22 September 2020	Tuesday 7:30pm	0.807	5	
5	19	"Guest Bedroom & Bathrooms Inspections"	23 September 2020	Wednesday 7:30pm	0.701	7	
6	20	"Guest Bedroom & Bathrooms Revealed" "Room Winners Announced"	27 September 2020	Sunday 7:00pm	0.928 0.997	4 3	
6	21	"Kitchens Begin"	28 September 2020	Monday 7:30pm	0.837	5	
6	22	"Kitchens Continue"	29 September 2020	Tuesday 7:30pm	0.809	5	
6	23	"Kitchen Inspections"	30 September 2020	Wednesday 7:30pm	0.828	5	
7	24	"Kitchens Revealed" "Room Winners Announced"	4 October 2020	Sunday 7:00pm	0.981 1.058	2 1	
7	25	"Living & Dinings Begin"	5 October 2020	Monday 7:30pm	0.939	5	
7	26	"Property Challenge"	6 October 2020	Tuesday 7:30pm	0.894	4	
7	27	"Living & Dinings Continue"	7 October 2020	Wednesday 7:30pm	0.744	5	
8	28	"Living & Dinings Revealed" "Room Winners Announced"	11 October 2020	Sunday 7:00pm	0.992 1.086	2 1	
8	29	"Upstairs Begin"	12 October 2020	Monday 7:30pm	0.863	5	
8	30	"LEGO Dream House Challenge"	13 October 2020	Tuesday 7:30pm	0.837	5	
8	31	"Upstairs Continue"	14 October 2020	Wednesday 7:30pm	0.744	7	
9	32	"Upstairs Revealed" "Room Winners Announced"	18 October 2020	Sunday 7:00pm	1.009 1.082	2 1	
9	33	"Stairway, Hallway & Laundries Begin"	19 October 2020	Monday 7:30pm	0.783	6	
9	34	"Portrait Challenge"	20 October 2020	Tuesday 7:30pm	0.793	6	
9	35	"Stairway, Hallway, Laundries Continue"	21 October 2020	Wednesday 7:30pm	0.809	5	
10	36	"Stairway, Hallway, Laundries Revealed" "Room Winners Announced"	26 October 2020	Monday 7:30pm	0.981 0.975	5 6	
10	37	"Front Gardens & Facades Begin"	27 October 2020	Tuesday 7:30pm	0.819	5	
10	38	"Sell in Style Challenge"	28 October 2020	Wednesday 7:30pm	0.762	6	
10	39	"Front Gardens & Facades Continue"	29 October 2020	Thursday 7:30pm	0.679	7	
11	40	"Front Gardens & Facades Revealed"	1 November 2020	Sunday 7:00pm	1.014	1	
11	41	"Studios & Garages Begin"	2 November 2020	Monday 7:30pm	0.830	5	
11	42	"Double Challenge Day"	3 November 2020	Tuesday 7:30pm	0.816	8	
11	43	"Studio & Garage Inspections"	5 November 2020	Thursday 7:30pm	0.739	6	
12	44	"Studios & Garages Revealed" "Room Winners Announced"	8 November 2020	Sunday 7:00pm	1.012 1.061	2 1	
12	45	"Backyards Begin"	9 November 2020	Monday 7:30pm	0.805	7	
12	46	"Backyards Continue"	10 November 2020	Tuesday 7:30pm	0.828	5	
12	47	"Backyard Inspections"	12 November 2020	Thursday 7:30pm	0.748	5	
13	48	"Backyards Revealed" "Room Winners Announced"	15 November 2020	Sunday 7:00pm	0.977 1.065	2 1	
13	49	"Open For Inspections - 9Now Exclusive"	16 November 2020	Monday 7:30pm	—N/a		
14	50	"Grand Final/ Auctions" "Winner Announced"	22 November 2020	Sunday 7:00pm	1.428 1.792	2 1	

== Notes ==
- ^{a} Ratings data is from OzTAM and represents the live and same day average viewership from the 5 largest Australian metropolitan centres (Sydney, Melbourne, Brisbane, Perth and Adelaide).
- ^{b} Throughout the course of the series, the teams total room score will be accumulated to decide which team will choose the auction order for all other teams.
- ^{c} The original score of Jimmy & Tam's Master Ensuite was 28, but they used a bonus point they won in the “Block It In Challenge”. Their score was changed to 29.
- ^{d} The original score of Daniel & Jade's Kitchen was 28½, but they used a bonus point they won in the “Pottery Challenge”. Their score was changed to 29½.
- ^{e} These are the rooms each teams has built Upstairs:
  - Sarah & George: Study, Powder Room & Bedroom
  - Luke & Jasmin: Living Room & Bedroom
  - Daniel & Jade: Bedroom, Living Room & Study
  - Harry & Tash: Bedroom & Study
  - Jimmy & Tam: Media Room & Bedroom
- ^{f} The original score of Jimmy & Tam's Stairway, Hallway & Laundry was 28, but they used a bonus point they won in the “LEGO Dream House Challenge”. Their score was changed to 29.
- These are the rooms each teams with Hipages Lever:
  - Harry & Tash: Master Bedroom & Walk-in-Robe
  - Luke & Jasmin: Guest Bedroom & Bathroom
  - Sarah & George: Living & Dining
  - Daniel & Jade: Front Garden & Facade
  - Jimmy & Tam: Studio & Garage
- ^{g} The buyer of the house at the auction failed to pay for the property for $4,256,000. Which made Jimmy and Tam win the series. This failure to pay for the property caused a void in the contract making the property go back on the market. However Jimmy and Tam were allowed to keep the prize of $100,000, as well as the money over reserve.
