= Fitzroy Street =

Fitzroy Street may refer to:

- Fitzrovia, a district of London including Fitzroy Street
- Fitzroy Street, Melbourne
- Fitzroy Street Group
