= Greyhound Hotel =

Former pub and gay bar in St Kilda, Victoria

The Greyhound Hotel
- The GH Hotel, the GH
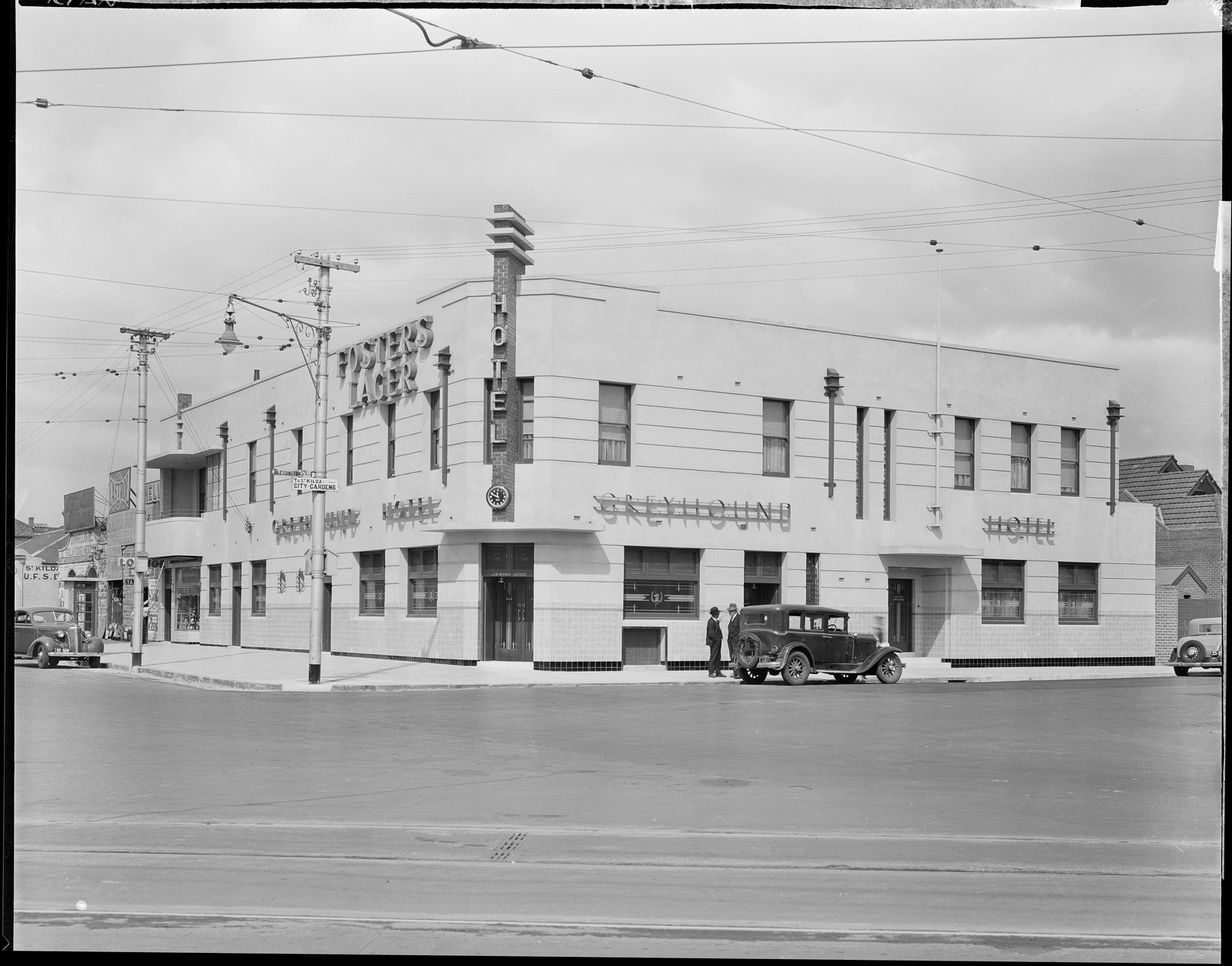
- Greyhound Hotel after renovation in 1937-1938
- Location: St Kilda, Victoria
- Type: Music venue
- Events: Independent music Drag performance

Construction
- Built: 1853
- Renovated: 1936-1938
- Demolished: 2017

The Greyhound Hotel was a pub and gay bar in St Kilda, Victoria. It was known for hosting live music and drag performances, described as the "drag capital of Melbourne". Despite community outcry and the council's recommendation otherwise, the pub failed to receive heritage protection and was demolished in 2017 after operating for 164 years. The building was a two-storey corner hotel, with an Art Deco/Moderne facade from its 1936-1938 remodelling.

== History ==
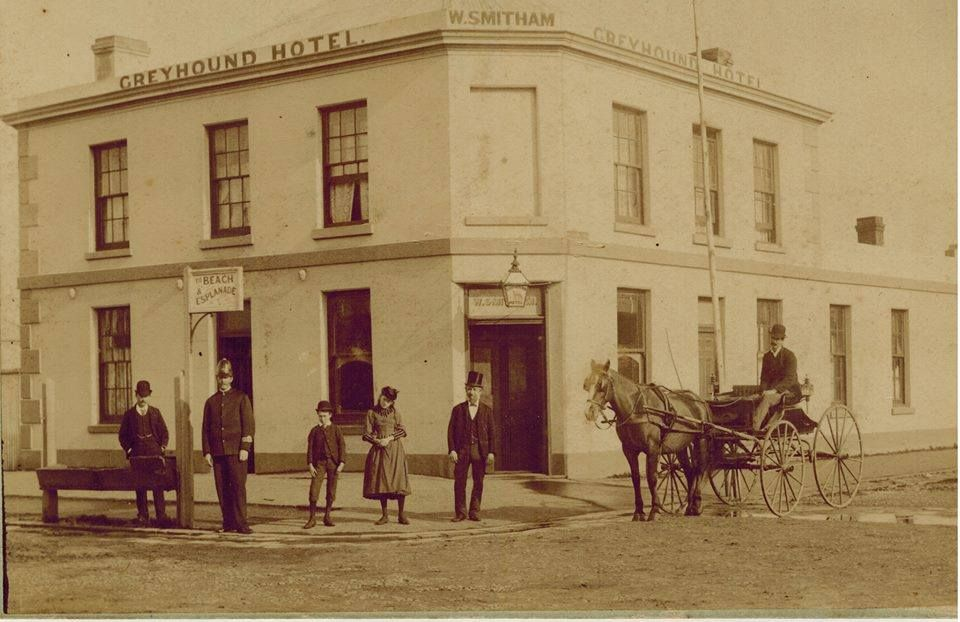
The Greyhound Hotel before its remodelling, c. 1886-93

The pub opened in 1853, with its name coming from the sport of greyhound racing, which the pub's first licensee, John Board, was a promoter of. The building was renovated extensively in 1936–38, with the construction of second storey, acquisition of neighboring land to expand the hotel, and a new Art Deco/Moderne facade.

The post-war reputation of the hotel was tied to its proximity to St Kilda's most prominent areas for sex workers. In the 1980s, the venue morphed from a "working man's boozer" into an important location for drag and LBGTQ culture.

In July 2016, an application to replace the Greyhound with an eight-storey apartment building was filed to City of Port Phillip council. While the director of the venue said demolition was a "back-up plan", the venue closed for good on 5 January 2017, despite its website still listening events as late as 20 January.

The pub could have been demolished at any time, as it did not meet heritage protection for architectural significance, despite its age, because it was remodelled in the 1930s. A public campaign to save the pub involving 2700 signatures caused the council to reevaluate the demolition. A report commissioned by the council found the venue was significant for reflecting the history of Victorian hotels, the "changing fortunes of St Kilda", and the local LGBT community. However, Planning Minister Richard Wynne declined to give the pub interim heritage protection despite the council's request.

The pub was demolished in May 2017. After the property developer went insolvent in 2019, construction on the apartments never commenced. As of 2026, the site continues to be vacant.

== Reaction and Legacy ==
Some fans and former patrons of the Greyhound Hotel went to the site after demolition to collect brick, plaster, and remnants of facade as keepsakes. An August 2022 heritage review from the City of Port Phillip considered sites of importance to the local LGBT community. Editor of the Star Observer, Matthew Wade, said that bars like the Greyhound were vital for the LGBT community, allowing people to explore their sexuality in a welcoming environment.

Crikey columnist Alan Davies said the closure of the venue was inevitable, as the business was commercially unviable with the ongoing gentrification in St Kilda. The demolition has been compared to the loss of other Melbourne pubs, including the London Hotel and the Corkman Irish Pub.
