= The Block season 15 =

The Block
- Season 15
- No. of episodes: 57

Release
- Original network: Nine Network
- Original release: 4 August – 10 November 2019

Season chronology
- ← Previous; Season 14 Next → Season 16

The fifteenth season of Australian reality television series The Block premiered on August 4, 2019, on the Nine Network. Hosts Scott Cam and Shelley Craft, site foreman Keith and Dan. Along with judges Neale Whitaker, Shaynna Blaze and Darren Palmer, with guest judges William Schirripa and Roshan Abraham, who all returned from the previous season. All time Ronald McDonald champion Erin Ng joined the show for the Ronald McDonald House challenge in week 8 of the shows filming.

== Production ==
In June 2018, it was reported that The Block producers had acquired a rundown backpackers accommodation, Oslo Hotel, at 38 Grey Street, St Kilda, through an off-market deal struck after the series approached one of the owners. The building contains five mansions hidden behind the facade. The series producers and building planners set to submit renovation plans to the City of Port Phillip council imminently. In October 2018, the Oslo Hotel was confirmed as the next location for renovation, Nine Network acquired the building for $10.8 million.

The Block’s open for inspection took place on Sunday, 20 October 2019. The Block auctions (or Block-tions) for the houses were held on Saturday, 9 November 2019, with the final episode of 2019 airing the next day on Channel Nine and 9Now at 7:00pm (ADST) on Sunday, 10 November 2019, including a 'In memory of' tribute to Peter Elliott (Peter Elliott Roofing).

Tess and Luke won the series with their house selling for over $3.6m. All houses sold on auction day with all couples profiting well over $300k.

== Contestants ==
This is the seventh season of The Block to have five couples instead of the traditional four couples.

House	Couple	Age	Location	Relationship	Occupations
1	Mitch Edwards & Mark McKie	56 & 57	Sydney, NSW	Partners	Marketing Manager & Business Manager
2	Tess Cattana & Luke Struber	28 & 30	Cairns, QLD	Married	Media Sales Partner & Carpenter
3	Andy & Deb Saunders	48 & 46	Wallabi Point, NSW	Married with children	Stand-up Comedian & Homewares Store Owner
4	El’ise & Matt Bothe	33 & 39	Perth, WA	Married with children	Fashion Manager & Carpenter
5	Jesse Raeburn & Melissa Manson	29 & 31	Melbourne, VIC	Partners	Real Estate Agent & Contracts Administrator

== Score history ==
Teams' progress through the competition
	Teams				
	Mitch & Mark	Tess & Luke	Andy & Deb	El’ise & Matt	Jesse & Mel
Rooms	Scores				
Guest Bedroom	24	17½	17½	21	25½
Guest Ensuite	27½	20	28	22	14
Formal Lounge	28½	22	25½	29	23
Master Bedroom & Walk-in Robe	27^{[b]}	24½	24½	26	22
Main Bathroom	24½	28	22½	26½	24
2nd Guest Bedroom	27	28½	29½^{[c]}	29	28½
Master Bathroom	29^{[d]}	27½	28½	26	28½
Kitchen	26	27½	29½	23½	28½
Living & Dining	22	22	28	24½	29
Courtyard	29	24½	26	26	29½
Studio	28½	29^{[e]}	28	27½	28½
Verandas	30	23½	20½	20½	16½
Hallways/Media Room/Study	26	20½	23	21	25½
Rooftop Terrace/Garage/Re-do room	22	27	29	30½^{[f]}	24
Front Garden/Veranda	21	26½	28	29½	22½
Auction Order	1st	2nd	4th	3rd	5th
Auction Result	5th	1st	3rd	2nd	4th

=== Weekly Room Prize ===
Week	Room	Winning team	Prize
1	Guest Bedroom	Jesse & Mel	Safe full of $140,000 worth of vouchers
1	Guest Ensuite	Andy & Deb	$10,000 cash
2	Formal lounge	El’ise & Matt	$10,000 cash and Gaggenau fridges
3	Master Bedroom & Walk-in-Robe	Mitch & Mark	$10,000 cash
4	Main Bathroom	Tess & Luke	$10,000 cash
5	2nd Guest Bedroom	Andy & Deb	$10,000 cash & $10,000 challenge win
6	Master Bathroom	Mitch & Mark	$10,000 cash
7	Kitchen	Andy & Deb	$10,000 cash & one night luxury getaway
8	Living & Dining	Jesse & Mel	$10,000 cash
9	Courtyard	Jesse & Mel	$10,000 cash
10	Studio	Tess & Luke	$10,000 cash
11	Verandas	Mitch & Mark	$10,000 cash
12	Hallways/Media Room/Study	Mitch & Mark	$10,000 cash & one night luxury getaway
13	Rooftop Terrace/Garage/Re-do room	El’ise & Matt	$10,000 cash
14	Front Garden/Veranda	El’ise & Matt	Volkswagen Tiguan

== Results ==
=== Judges' scores ===
Colour key:
Highest Score
Lowest Score

Summary of judges' scores
Week	Area(s)	Scores	Teams				
Week	Area(s)	Scores	Mitch & Mark	Tess & Luke	Andy & Deb	El’ise & Matt	Jesse & Mel
1	Guest Bedroom	Darren	8	6	6	7½	8½
1	Guest Bedroom	Shaynna	8	6	6	7	8
1	Guest Bedroom	Neale	8	5½	5½	6½	9
1	Guest Bedroom	Total	24	17½	17½	21	25½
1	Guest Ensuite	Darren	9½	7	9½	8	6
1	Guest Ensuite	Shaynna	9	7	9	7½	5
1	Guest Ensuite	Neale	9	6	9½	6½	3
1	Guest Ensuite	Total	27½	20	28	22	14
2	Formal Lounge	Darren	9½	7	8½	9½	8½
2	Formal Lounge	Shaynna	9½	7½	8½	9½	7½
2	Formal Lounge	Neale	9½	7½	8½	10	7
2	Formal Lounge	Total	28½	22	25½	29	23
3	Master Bedroom & Walk-in-Robe	Darren	9	8½	8½	9	7½
3	Master Bedroom & Walk-in-Robe	Shaynna	9	8	8	8½	7½
3	Master Bedroom & Walk-in-Robe	Neale	9	8	8	8½	7
3	Master Bedroom & Walk-in-Robe	Total	27^{[b]}	24½	24½	26	22
4	Main Bathroom	Darren	9	9½	7½	9	9
4	Main Bathroom	Shaynna	8	9½	7½	9	7½
4	Main Bathroom	Neale	7½	9	7½	8½	7½
4	Main Bathroom	Total	24½	28	22½	26½	24
5	2nd Guest Bedroom	Darren	9	10	9½	10	9½
5	2nd Guest Bedroom	Shaynna	9	9	9½	9½	9
5	2nd Guest Bedroom	Neale	9	9½	9½	9½	10
5	2nd Guest Bedroom	Total	27	28½	29½^{[c]}	29	28½
6	Master Bathroom	Darren	9½	9	9½	9	10
6	Master Bathroom	Shaynna	9½	9½	9	8	9
6	Master Bathroom	Neale	10	9	10	9	9½
6	Master Bathroom	Total	29^{[d]}	27½	28½	26	28½
7	Kitchen	Darren	9	9	9½	8	9½
7	Kitchen	Shaynna	8½	9½	10	7½	9½
7	Kitchen	Neale	8½	9	10	8	9½
7	Kitchen	Total	26	27½	29½	23½	28½
8	Living & Dining	Darren	7	7	9½	7½	10
8	Living & Dining	Shaynna	7	7	9	8	9½
8	Living & Dining	Neale	8	8	9½	9	9½
8	Living & Dining	Total	22	22	28	24½	29
9	Courtyard	Darren	10	8½	9	8½	9½
9	Courtyard	Shaynna	9½	7½	9	8½	10
9	Courtyard	Neale	9½	8½	8	9	10
9	Courtyard	Total	29	24½	26	26	29½
10	Studio	Darren	9	9½	9	9	9½
10	Studio	Shaynna	9½	9	9	9	9½
10	Studio	Neale	10	9½	10	9½	9½
10	Studio	Total	28½	29^{[e]}	28	27½	28½
11	Verandas	Darren	10	7½	7	8	5
11	Verandas	Shaynna	10	7½	6½	6½	6½
11	Verandas	Neale	10	8½	7	6	5
11	Verandas	Total	30	23½	20½	20½	16½
12	Hallways/Media Room	Darren	8½	6½	7½	7	8½
12	Hallways/Media Room	Shaynna	8½	7	7½	7	8½
12	Hallways/Media Room	Neale	9	7	8	7	8½
12	Hallways/Media Room	Total	26	20½	23	21	25½
13	Rooftop Terrace/Garage/Re-do room	Darren	7½	9	9½	9½	8
13	Rooftop Terrace/Garage/Re-do room	Shaynna	7½	9	9½	10	8
13	Rooftop Terrace/Garage/Re-do room	Neale	7	9	10	10	8
13	Rooftop Terrace/Garage/Re-do room	Total	22	27	29	30½^{[f]}	24
14	Front Garden/Veranda	Darren	7	9½	9½	9½	8
14	Front Garden/Veranda	Shaynna	7	8½	9½	10	7½
14	Front Garden/Veranda	Neale	7	8½	9	10	7
14	Front Garden/Veranda	Total	21	26½	28	29½	22½

=== Challenge scores ===
Summary of challenge scores
Week	Challenge		Reward	Teams				
Week	Challenge	Description	Reward	Mitch & Mark	Tess & Luke	Andy & Deb	El’ise & Matt	Jesse & Mel
1	The Mud Pit Challenge	Dig through a mud pit to find a house number	The number they find will be their house	House 1	House 2	House 3	House 4	House 5
3	The Domain Challenge	Guess the value of 5 different houses around Melbourne	The pick of real estate that will represent them for auction & $10,000 cash	4th	2nd	3rd	5th	1st
4	The Style a Room Challenge	Style a room for $3000 or less	$5,000 & 1 Bonus Point	—	—	1st	—	—
5	The Carpool Karaoke Mini-Challenge	Sing the best	$1,000	—	—	–	1st	—
5	The All-Stars Challenge	Work well with the All-stars and win room reveal	$10,000	—	—	1st	—	—
6	Luxury Styling Challenge	Create a high end, luxury style room on a budget	$5,000 each	—	—	1st	—	1st
7	Challenge Charity Challenge	Makeover a house for families of sick kids in Torquay	$5,000 & 1 Bonus Point	—	1st	—	—	—
8	Ronald McDonald House Challenge	Raising money by swapping $1000 for more valuable items	$5,000	$40,000	$20,000	$30,000	$45,000	$14,000
9	Lip Sync Challenge	Perform and lip sync a song	1st:$5000 2nd:$3000 3rd:$2000	—	3rd	1st	2nd	—
10	Little home Challenge	Make over a little home	$5,000	—	—	—	—	1st
11	Obstacle Course Challenge	Complete an obstacle course in the fastest time	$5,000 & 1 Bonus Point	—	—	—	1st	—
14	Public Vote Challenge	Public vote on their favourite house	$10,000	811 votes	959 votes	1292 votes	761 votes	788 votes

Savvy Saver Award ($5,000)

Episode	Airdate	Winning Team	Source
11	20 August	Jesse & Mel	
19	3 September	Mitch & Mark	
28	18 September	Andy & Deb	

=== Auction ===
Rank	Couple	Reserve	Auction Result	Profit	Total Winnings	Auction Order
1st	Tess & Luke	$2.990m	$3.620m	$630,000	$730,000	2nd
2nd	El'ise & Matt	$2.990m	$3.450m	$460,000	$460,000	3rd
3rd	Andy & Deb	$2.990m	$3.420m	$430,000	$430,000	4th
4th	Jesse & Mel	$2.990m	$3.378m	$388,000	$388,000	5th
5th	Mitch & Mark	$2.990m	$3.374m	$384,000	$384,000	1st

== Ratings ==
The Block 2019 metropolitan viewership and nightly position Colour key: – Highest rating during the series – Lowest rating during the series
Week	Episode		Original airdate	Timeslot	Viewers (millions)^{[a]}	Nightly rank^{[a]}	Source
1	1	"Welcome to the Oslo"	4 August 2019	Sunday 7:00pm	0.991	3	
1	2	"Guest Bedroom and Ensuites Begin"	5 August 2019	Monday 7:30pm	0.859	5	
1	3	"Guest Bedroom and Ensuites Continue"	6 August 2019	Tuesday 7:30pm	0.876	5	
1	4	"Guest Bedroom Early Reveal"	7 August 2019	Wednesday 7:30pm	0.886	4	
2	5	"Ensuites Revealed"	11 August 2019	Sunday 7:00pm	0.996	3	
2	6	"Formal Lounge Begins"	12 August 2019	Monday 7:30pm	0.842	5	
2	7	"Formal Lounge continues"	13 August 2019	Tuesday 7:30pm	0.851	5	
2	8	"Budget Blowouts"	14 August 2019	Wednesday 7:30pm	0.765	6	
3	9	"Formal Lounges Revealed"	18 August 2019	Sunday 7:00pm	1.120	1	
3	10	"Master Bedrooms & Walk-in-Robes Begin"	19 August 2019	Monday 7:30pm	0.893	5	
3	11	"Master Bedrooms & Walk-in-Robes continue"	20 August 2019	Tuesday 7:30pm	0.852	3	
3	12	"Budget Saving"	21 August 2019	Wednesday 7:30pm	0.803	5	
4	13	"Master Bedrooms & Walk-in-Robes Revealed"	25 August 2019	Sunday 7:00pm	1.094	2	
4	14	"Main Bathrooms Begin"	26 August 2019	Monday 7:30pm	0.916	4	
4	15	"Main Bathrooms Continue"	27 August 2019	Tuesday 7:30pm	0.883	5	
4	16	"Room Switch"	28 August 2019	Wednesday 7:30pm	0.828	5	
5	17	"Main Bathrooms Revealed"	1 September 2019	Sunday 7:00pm	0.975	1	
5	18	"2nd Guest Bedrooms Begin"	2 September 2019	Monday 7:30pm	0.906	5	
5	19	"2nd Guest Bedrooms Continue"	3 September 2019	Tuesday 7:30pm	0.847	5	
5	20	"All Stars Take Charge"	4 September 2019	Wednesday 7:30pm	0.750	5	
6	21	"2nd Guest Bedrooms Revealed"	8 September 2019	Sunday 7:00pm	1.145	1	
6	22	"Master Bathrooms Begin"	9 September 2019	Monday 7:30pm	0.978	4	
6	23	"Master Bathrooms Continue"	10 September 2019	Tuesday 7:30pm	0.968	3	
6	24	"Challenge Day"	11 September 2019	Wednesday 7:30pm	0.833	5	
7	25	"Master Bathrooms Revealed"	15 September 2019	Sunday 7:00pm	1.139	1	
7	26	"Kitchens Begin"	16 September 2019	Monday 7:30pm	0.940	4	
7	27	"Charity Challenge"	17 September 2019	Tuesday 7:30pm	0.857	7	
7	28	"Kitchens Continue"	18 September 2019	Wednesday 7:30pm	0.834	4	
8	29	"Kitchens Revealed"	22 September 2019	Sunday 7:00pm	1.155	1	
8	30	"Living & Dinings Begin"	23 September 2019	Monday 7:30pm	0.801	9	
8	31	"Living & Dinings Continue"	24 September 2019	Tuesday 7:30pm	0.816	6	
8	32	"Ronald McDonald Challenge"	25 September 2019	Wednesday 7:30pm	0.963	1	
9	33	"Living & Dinings Revealed"	29 September 2019	Sunday 7:00pm	1.032	1	
9	34	"Courtyards Begin"	30 September 2019	Monday 7:30pm	0.806	8	
9	35	"Courtyards Continue"	1 October 2019	Tuesday 7:30pm	0.820	6	
9	36	"Lip Sync Battle Challenge"	2 October 2019	Wednesday 7:30pm	0.853	3	
10	37	"Courtyards Revealed"	7 October 2019	Monday 7:30pm	0.979	1	
10	38	"Studios Begin"	8 October 2019	Tuesday 7:30pm	0.897	3	
10	39	"Studios Continue"	9 October 2019	Wednesday 7:30pm	0.855	3	
10	40	"Money Blowout"	10 October 2019	Thursday 7:30pm	0.747	5	
11	41	"Studios Revealed"	13 October 2019	Sunday 7:00pm	1.136	2	
11	42	"Verandas Begin"	14 October 2019	Monday 7:30pm	0.970	4	
11	43	"Verandas Continue"	15 October 2019	Tuesday 7:30pm	0.844	4	
11	44	"Obstacle Course Challenge"	16 October 2019	Wednesday 7:30pm	0.872	3	
12	45	"Verandas Revealed"	20 October 2019	Sunday 7:00pm	1.097	1	
12	46	"Hallways/Media Room/Study Begin"	21 October 2019	Monday 7:30pm	0.897	6	
12	47	"Hallways/Media Room/Study Continues"	22 October 2019	Tuesday 7:30pm	0.917	1	
12	48	"Domain Cover Winner"	23 October 2019	Wednesday 7:30pm	0.800	3	
13	49	"Hallways/Media Room/Study Revealed"	27 October 2019	Sunday 7:00pm	1.087	1	
13	50	"Roof Top Terrace/ Garage/ Re-do Room Begin"	28 October 2019	Monday 7:30pm	0.945	2	
13	51	"Roof Top Terrace/ Garage/ Re-do Room Continue"	29 October 2019	Tuesday 7:30pm	0.896	2	
13	52	"Money Struggles"	30 October 2019	Wednesday 7:30pm	0.804	3	
14	53	"Roof Top Terrace/ Garage/ Re-do Room Revealed"	3 November 2019	Sunday 7:00pm	1.131	1	
14	54	"Front Garden/Verandas Begin"	4 November 2019	Monday 7:30pm	0.953	1	
14	55	"Front Garden/Verandas Final Reveal"	5 November 2019	Tuesday 7:30pm	0.972	3	
14	56	"Open For Inspections"	6 November 2019	Wednesday 7:30pm	0.811	5	
15	57	"Grand Final/ Auctions"	10 November 2019	Sunday 7:00 pm	1.541	2	
15	57	"Winner Announced"	10 November 2019	Sunday 7:00 pm	1.924	1	

== Notes ==
- ^{a} Ratings data is from OzTAM and represents the live and same day average viewership from the 5 largest Australian metropolitan centres (Sydney, Melbourne, Brisbane, Perth and Adelaide).
- ^{b} Mitch & Mark changed the floor plans and presented an entertaining area rather than a Master Bedroom, reducing their house to 3 bedrooms.
- ^{c} The original score of Andy & Deb’s 2nd Guest Bedroom was 28½, but they used a bonus point they won in the “Style a room Challenge”. Their score was changed to 29½.
- ^{d} As well as presenting an ensuite, Mitch & Mark also presented a kitchenette to utilise in their upstairs entertaining area.
- ^{e} The original score of Tess & Luke’s Studio was 28, but they used a bonus point they won in the “Challenge charity challenge”. Their score was changed to 29.
- ^{f} The original score of El’ise & Matt’s Rooftop Terrace/Redo Room/Garage was 29½, but they used a bonus point they won in the “obstacle course challenge”. Their score was changed to 30½. This set a record as the highest room score in Block History.
