= The Block season 6 =

The Block
- Season 6
- No. of episodes: 39

Release
- Original network: Nine Network
- Original release: 4 February – 20 March 2013

Season chronology
- ← Previous; Season 5 Next → Season 7

The sixth season of Australian reality television series The Block, titled The Block: All Stars, aired on the Nine Network. Both Scott Cam returned as host and Shelley Craft as "Challenge Master". Neale Whitaker & Shaynna Blaze returned as judges, Darren Palmer returned as a full-time judge replacing John McGrath who returned as a guest judge. The season premiered on Monday, 4 February 2013 at 7:00 pm.

Production for the series relocated from Melbourne—which had hosted the prior two seasons—to its original location of Bondi in Sydney to celebrate the tenth anniversary of the show's first season.

== Contestants ==
This season saw the return of four former teams from past seasons of The Block retroactively named The "All-stars".

| House | Couple | Relationship | Season |
|---|---|---|---|
| 1 | Phil Rankine and Amity Dry | Married | 1 |
| 2 | Mark Bowyer and Duncan Miller | Best mates | 3 |
| 3 | Josh and Jenna Densten | Newlyweds | 4 |
| 4 | Dan and Dani Reilly | Boyfriend and Girlfriend | 5 |

This block was located at 2, 4, 6. and 8 Tasman Street in Bondi NSW.

== Score History ==
Teams' progress through the competition
| Scores: | Teams | | | |
| Scores: | Josh & Jenna | Mark & Duncan | Phil & Amity | Dan & Dani |
| Rooms | Scores | | | |
| 1st Bedroom | 22½ | 21½ | 19 | 14 |
| 2nd Bedroom | 21½ | 24 | 23 | 20 |
| Bathroom | 25 | 24 | 22 | 24 |
| Hallway, Lounge & Linen Closet | 18½ | 18 | 26 | 25 |
| Kitchen/Laundry | 29½ | 23 | 28½ | 25 |
| Living Room | 21 | 20 | 23½ | 26½ |
| Exteriors | 34 | 35½ | 35½ | 30 |
| Auction Order | 1st | 2nd | 4th | 3rd |
| Auction Result | 2nd | 4th | 1st | 3rd |

== Results ==
=== Room Reveals ===
| Week | Room | Winning Couple | 2nd Couple | 3rd Couple | Chumps |
|---|---|---|---|---|---|
| 1 | 1st Bedroom | Josh and Jenna | Mark and Duncan | Phil and Amity | Dan and Dani |
| 2 | 2nd Bedroom | Mark and Duncan | Phil and Amity | Josh and Jenna | Dan and Dani |
| 3 | Bathroom | Josh and Jenna | Dan and Dani/Mark and Duncan | | Phil and Amity |
| 4 | Hallway, Formal Lounge and Linen Closet | Phil and Amity | Dan and Dani | Josh and Jenna | Mark and Duncan |
| 5 | Kitchen and Laundry | Josh and Jenna | Phil and Amity | Dan and Dani | Dale and Duncan |
| 6 | Living Room | Dan and Dani | Phil and Amity | Josh and Jenna | Dale and Duncan |
| 7 | Front and Back Yards | Phil and Amity/Mark and Duncan | | Josh and Jenna | Dan and Dani |

=== Judges' Scores ===
Summary of judges' scores
| Week | Area(s) | Scores | Phil & Amity | Mark & Duncan | Josh & Jenna | Dan & Dani |
| 1 | 1st Bedroom | Darren | 7 | 7 | 7½ | 6 |
| 1 | 1st Bedroom | Shaynna | 6 | 7 | 7 | 4 |
| 1 | 1st Bedroom | Neale | 6 | 7½ | 8 | 4 |
| 1 | 1st Bedroom | Total | 19 | 21½ | 22½ | 14 |
| 2 | 2nd Bedroom | Darren | 8 | 8 | 7½ | 7 |
| 2 | 2nd Bedroom | Shaynna | 7½ | 8 | 7 | 6½ |
| 2 | 2nd Bedroom | Neale | 7½ | 8 | 7 | 6½ |
| 2 | 2nd Bedroom | Total | 23 | 24 | 21½ | 20 |
| 3 | Bathroom | Darren | 7½ | 8 | 8½ | 8½ |
| 3 | Bathroom | Shaynna | 7 | 8 | 7½ | 7½ |
| 3 | Bathroom | Neale | 7½ | 8 | 9 | 8 |
| 3 | Bathroom | Total | 22 | 24 | 25 | 24 |
| 4 | Hallway, Lounge & Linen Closet | Darren | 8 | 6½ | 6½ | 8 |
| 4 | Hallway, Lounge & Linen Closet | Shaynna | 9 | 6 | 6 | 9 |
| 4 | Hallway, Lounge & Linen Closet | Neale | 9 | 5½ | 6 | 8 |
| 4 | Hallway, Lounge & Linen Closet | Total | 26 | 18 | 18½ | 25 |
| 5 | Kitchen & Laundry | Darren | 9½ | 7½ | 9½ | 8 |
| 5 | Kitchen & Laundry | Shaynna | 10 | 7½ | 10 | 8 |
| 5 | Kitchen & Laundry | Neale | 10 (-1) | 8 | 10 | 9 |
| 5 | Kitchen & Laundry | Total | 28½ | 23 | 29½ | 25 |
| 6 | Living Room | Darren | 8 | 7 | 7 | 8½ |
| 6 | Living Room | Shaynna | 7½ | 7 | 7 | 9 |
| 6 | Living Room | Neale | 8 | 6 | 7 | 9 |
| 6 | Living Room | Total | 23½ | 20 | 21 | 26½ |
| 7 | Exteriors | Darren | 9 | 9 | 9 | 8 |
| 7 | Exteriors | Shaynna | 9½ | 9 | 9 | 7½ |
| 7 | Exteriors | Neale | 9 | 9 | 8 | 7½ |
| 7 | Exteriors | John | 8 | 8½ | 8 | 7 |
| 7 | Exteriors | Total | 35½ | 35½ | 34 | 30 |

=== Auction ===
| Rank | Couple | Reserve | Auction Result | Profit | Total Winnings | Auction Order |
|---|---|---|---|---|---|---|
| 1 | Phil and Amity | $1.375m | $1.670m | $295,000 | $395,000 | 4th |
| 2 | Josh and Jenna | $1.375m | $1.650m | $275,000 | $275,000 | 1st |
| 3 | Dani and Dan | $1.355m | $1.575m | $220,000 | $220,000 | 3rd |
| 4 | Mark and Duncan | $1.345m | $1.370m | $25,000 | $25,000 | 2nd |

== Ratings ==
The Block: All Stars metropolitan viewership and nightly position Colour key: – Highest rating episode and week during the series – Lowest rating episode and week during the series
| Week | Episode | | Original airdate | Viewers (millions)^{[a]} | Nightly rank^{[a]} | Source | Week Avg |
|---|---|---|---|---|---|---|---|
| 1 | 1 | "Move Into The Block" | 4 February 2013 | 0.959 | #9 | | 0.923 |
| 1 | 2 | "Charity Makeover Challenge" | 5 February 2013 | 0.952 | #9 | | 0.923 |
| 1 | 3 | "The Safe Opens" | 7 February 2013 | 0.858 | #9 | | 0.923 |
| 2 | 4 | "Bedroom 1 Reveal" | 10 February 2013 | —N/a | —N/a | | 0.725 |
| 2 | 5 | "Bedroom 2 Renovations Begins" | 11 February 2013 | 1.137 | #6 | | 0.725 |
| 2 | 6 | "Bedroom 2 Renovations Continue" | 12 February 2013 | 0.926 | #9 | | 0.725 |
| 2 | 7 | "Restoration Nation Challenge" | 13 February 2013 | 0.842 | #9 | | 0.725 |
| 2 | 8 | "Scott and Shelley Walk Around The Block" | 14 February 2013 | 0.842 | #7 | | 0.725 |
| 2 | 9 | "The Block Unlocked" | 15 February 2013 | 0.722 | #9 | | 0.725 |
| 3 | 10 | "Bedroom 2 Reveal" | 17 February 2013 | 1.119 | #7 | | 1.037 |
| 3 | 11 | "Bathroom Renovations Begin" | 18 February 2013 | 1.080 | #7 | | 1.037 |
| 3 | 12 | "The Block Olympian Challenge" | 19 February 2013 | 1.095 | #5 | | 1.037 |
| 3 | 13 | "The Belle Bathroom Challenge" | 20 February 2013 | 1.041 | #5 | | 1.037 |
| 3 | 14 | "Hell Week Continues" | 21 February 2013 | 0.980 | #4 | | 1.037 |
| 3 | 15 | "Dani Takes Charge" | 22 February 2013 | 0.908 | #4 | | 1.037 |
| 3 | 16 | "The Block Unlocked" | 22 February 2013 | —N/a | —N/a | | 1.037 |
| 4 | 17 | "Bathroom Reveal" | 24 February 2013 | 1.399 | #1 | | 1.129 |
| 4 | 18 | "Triple Room Week Begins" | 25 February 2013 | 1.194 | #6 | | 1.129 |
| 4 | 19 | "Triple Room Week Continues" | 26 February 2013 | 1.173 | #5 | | 1.129 |
| 4 | 20 | "Go-Karting Challenge" | 27 February 2013 | 1.030 | #5 | | 1.129 |
| 4 | 21 | "The 2nd Safe Opens" | 28 February 2013 | 1.040 | #5 | | 1.129 |
| 4 | 22 | "Brad and Lara Return" | 28 February 2013 | —N/a | —N/a | | 1.129 |
| 4 | 23 | "The Block Unlocked" | 1 March 2013 | 0.939 | #5 | | 1.129 |
| 5 | 24 | "Triple Room Reveal" | 3 March 2013 | 1.444 | #1 | | 1.265 |
| 5 | 25 | "Someone Leaves The block" | 4 March 2013 | 1.531 | #2 | | 1.265 |
| 5 | 26 | "Kitchen Renovations Continues" | 5 March 2013 | 1.372 | #3 | | 1.265 |
| 5 | 27 | "New Arrival On The Block" | 6 March 2013 | 1.294 | #2 | | 1.265 |
| 5 | 28 | "Dan Unchained" | 7 March 2013 | 1.234 | #2 | | 1.265 |
| 5 | 29 | "The Block Unlocked" | 8 March 2013 | 0.716 | #10 | | 1.265 |
| 6 | 30 | "Kitchen Reveal" | 10 March 2013 | 1.489 | #1 | | 1.254 |
| 6 | 31 | "War On The Block" | 11 March 2013 | 1.471 | #2 | | 1.254 |
| 6 | 32 | "Dan Strips For Charity" | 12 March 2013 | 1.357 | #3 | | 1.254 |
| 6 | 33 | "Bondi Sculpture Challenge" | 13 March 2013 | 1.226 | #2 | | 1.254 |
| 6 | 34 | "Phil's Revenge" | 14 March 2013 | 1.304 | #2 | | 1.254 |
| 6 | 35 | "The Block Unlocked" | 15 March 2013 | 0.677 | #8 | | 1.254 |
| 7 | 36 | "Living Room Reveal" | 17 March 2013 | 1.572 | #1 | | 1.712 |
| 7 | 37 | "Exterior Renovations Continue" | 18 March 2013 | 1.397 | #2 | | 1.712 |
| 7 | 38 | "Exterior Reveal " | 19 March 2013 | 1.526 | #2 | | 1.712 |
| 7 | 39 | "Grand Final" | 20 March 2013 | 1.646 | #3 | | 1.712 |
| 7 | 39 | "Auctions" | 20 March 2013 | 2.011 | #2 | | 1.712 |
| 7 | 39 | "Winner Announced" | 20 March 2013 | 2.119 | #1 | | 1.712 |

- ^{a} Ratings data is from OzTAM and represents the live and same day average viewership from the 5 largest Australian metropolitan centres (Sydney, Melbourne, Brisbane, Perth and Adelaide).
