= Manspace =

Manspace may refer to:

- Man cave
- ManSpace (TV series)
- ManSpace, a consumer magazine published by Connection Magazines
