= ManSpace (TV series) =

- Genre: Men's Magazine
- Presented by: Dan Anstey; Shane Jacobson; Dale Vine
- Country of origin: Australia
- Original language: English
- No. of seasons: 2
- No. of episodes: 10 (1st season); 6 (2nd season)

Production
- Executive producers: Harvey Silver; Shane Jacobson
- Running time: 30 minutes (1st season); 60 minutes (2nd season)
- Production company: Silver Spoon Productions

Original release
- Network: 9Go!
- Release: 26 May 2014 – present

ManSpace is an Australian television series that airs on 9Go! and repeats after midnight on the Nine Network. It began airing on 26 May 2014. It is hosted by Dan Anstey with Shane Jacobson and Dale Vine.

The program endeavours to showcase the most impressive man caves and collectors from across Australia, and also addresses men's issues and special interests. Season 1 was filmed in front of a live studio audience, whereas season 2 was shot on location.

Other contributors include comedian Des Dowling, former AFL players Brett Stephens and Michael Gale, aka “Moose and Butch”, and former Sale of the Century model Murray Bingham.

Shane Jacobson was involved in life-threatening accident whilst filming a segment for the show in 2015, when his Polaris racing buggy flipped multiple times during a competition. Whilst the incident appeared serious he was uninjured.

The show is based on the Australian magazine of the same name (ManSpace Magazine), which is published by Connection Magazines.
