= Dan Anstey =

Australian presenter

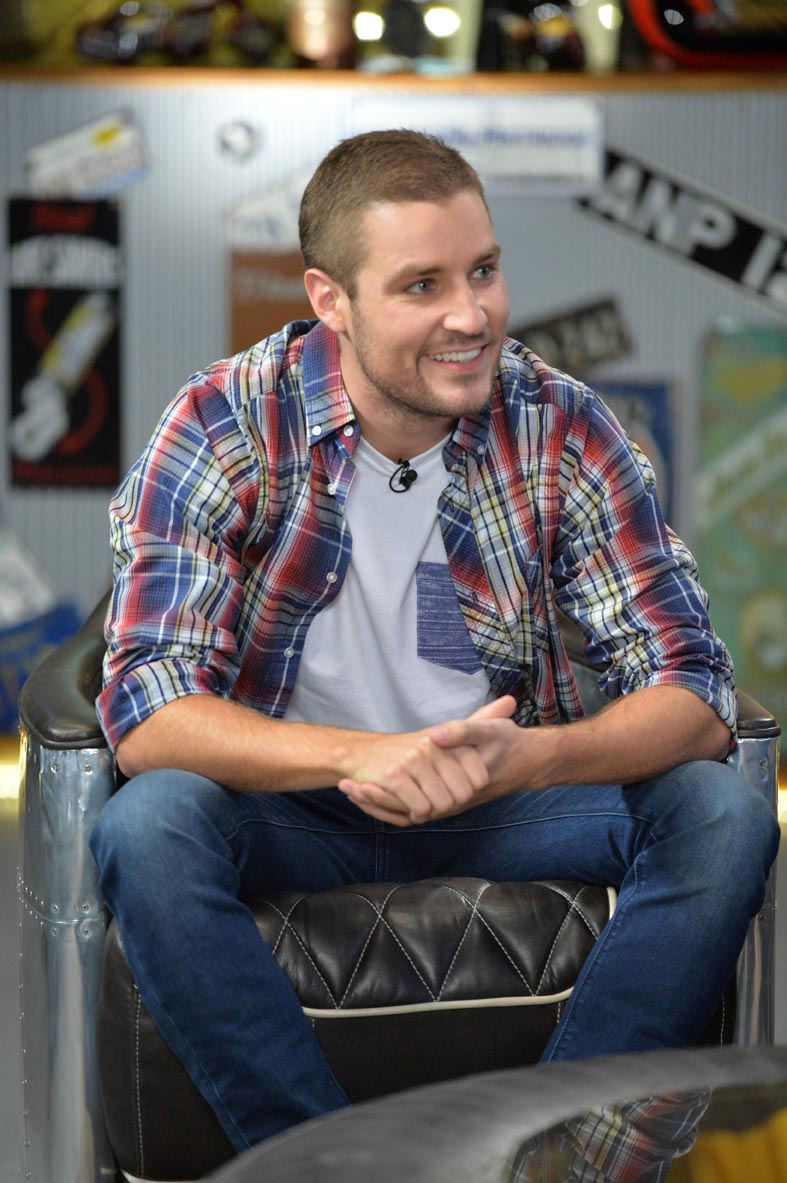
- Dan Anstey on the set of ManSpace in 2014
- Born: Daniel Matthew Anstey; 19 December 1984 (age 41); Brisbane, Australia
- Education: Bachelor of Electrical Engineering (Hons), University of Queensland
- Occupations: Radio and television presenter
- Employer(s): Nine Network, Triple M Brisbane

Dan Anstey (born 19 December 1984 in Brisbane, Queensland), is an Australian radio and television presenter.

He is currently host of Triple M Breakfast in Brisbane, weather presenter on Weekend Today and the Brisbane Lions number-one ticket holder.

Previously, he hosted the Nine Network television series ManSpace, the 7mate Stihl Timbersports Series, various radio shows across the Nova and Southern Cross Austereo networks, and has appeared on The Project.

== Personal life ==
After graduating as dux of Nambour State High School in 2001, Anstey attained a bachelor's degree in electrical engineering with Honours from the University of Queensland in 2005.

He has a verified IQ of 134, making him eligible to join Mensa.

On Christmas Day, 2017 he became engaged to his long-term girlfriend Clare Dufty. They married on the Gold Coast on 25 August 2018, and have a daughter named name Halle Ann born 14 April 2019 and a son named August Matthew born 31 August 2021.

== Career ==
=== Radio ===
Anstey began his radio career in 2007 as part of Brisbane's Nova 106.9 promotional street team, of which Scott Tweedie was also a member.

In 2011 he was named as co-host of the Nova 106.9 breakfast show alongside Ashley Bradnam, David Lutteral and Camilla Severi. When Kip Wightman returned to station in 2012 Anstey was shifted to "The Dan Anstey Show" which aired weekday afternoons, before again being moved to Melbourne sister station Nova 100 as anchor of the breakfast show Hughesy & Kate.

When Hughesy & Kate ended in 2013 Anstey was hired by rival Melbourne station Fox FM to anchor its new breakfast show Fifi & Dave. In 2015, Fox FM announced he would be leaving the show and was to be replaced by Byron Cooke.

On 27 May 2022, Anstey announced his resignation from 90.9 Sea FM and from the breakfast show with Bianca Dye and Ben Hannant after six years with the station. He later announced that he will join Triple M to anchor breakfast with Greg 'Marto' Martin and Margaux Parker.

=== Television ===
In 2007, Anstey began presenting short film reviews on Reel2Reel, a film review program broadcast by the Brisbane community television station Briz31 (now known as Queensland Online TV).

He has been a regular contributor to The Project since 2010, reporting from Brisbane, Melbourne and the Gold Coast.

In 2014, Anstey was named as host of the Nine Network television series ManSpace, alongside Shane Jacobson and Dale Vine. He hosted two seasons of the program.

In January 2022, Anstey joined Weekend Today as weather presenter.

In December 2024, Anstey filled in for Karl Stefanovic as co-host on Today with Samantha Armytage.

=== Other ===
Along with Leon Murray he hosted the internet series Add a Motor to it in 2011. The show featured various everyday items that had been motorised, including a couch that set the world record for fastest sofa at 163 km/h (101 mph).

In 2014, Anstey was part of an MLC advertising campaign that tasked him with delivering a plate of Australian lamb to Julian Assange, at the time a political refugee in the Ecuadorian Embassy of London. He was unsuccessful in his duty.

== Awards and honours ==
He is the current Brisbane Lions number-one ticket holder, having held the title since 2023.

Anstey was named one of "The Top New Talent to Watch" in 2014 by Radio Today.

He has twice won the Australian Commercial Radio Award for Best Comedy Segment, in 2012 and 2015, and was a presenter, appearing on stage dressed as a clown, at the ceremony in 2014 with Fifi Box.
