= Nick, Luttsy & Susie =

Nick, Luttsy & Susie O’Neill
- Genre: Comedy
- Running time: 180 minutes
- Country of origin: Australia
- Language: English
- Home station: Nova 106.9 Brisbane
- Hosted by: Nick Allen-Ducat (2025–present); David "Luttsy" Lutteral (2005–09; 2011–present); Susie O'Neill (2016–25, 2026–present)
- Executive producer: Ashleigh Smith
- Recording studio: Commercial Road, Teneriffe, Queensland
- Original release: April 4, 2005 – present (except 2009–2011)
- Audio format: Stereo
- Website: Official website

Nick, Luttsy & Susie O’Neill is an Australian Breakfast radio show made up of Nick Allen-Ducat, David "Luttsy" Lutteral and Susie O’Neill. It is broadcast on Nova 106.9 Brisbane from 6 am to 9 am on weekdays.

A daily podcast featuring the best bits from each show is available on the Nova Player as is the podcast for all other Nova FM shows in Australia.

== History ==
The show commenced with Nova 106.9's inaugural broadcast on 4 April 2005 starring Meshel Laurie, Ashley Bradnam, David "Luttsy" Lutteral and Kip Wightman. The show disbanded in 2009 with Wightman leaving to join his girlfriend Emileigh in Boston and Bradnam standing down due to personal issues. This eventually led to Laurie fronting a new show, Meshel, Tim and Marty.

The original breakfast show partially reformed in 2011 with Ash and Luttsy rejoining the station, alongside Camilla Severi and Dan Anstey.

In November 2011, it was announced that Kip Wightman would be re-joining the Breakfast show in 2012 to present Ash, Kip and Luttsy.

In May 2016, Susie O'Neill joined the show as co-host. They were the #1 Breakfast radio program in Brisbane in 2019.

In October 2021, Kip Wightman resigned from the show after 15 years with the network. Chris “Buzz” Bezzina was later appointed as anchor of the show.

Ange Anderson, the show's long-term newsreader, departed in mid-2023 after twelve years. She was a recipient of the Best Commercial Newsreader (FM) award at the Australian Commercial Radio Awards in 2016 and 2019.

In October 2024, O'Neill announced that she would be leaving the show on 28 November.

In November 2025, Nova announced that Nikki Osborne will join the show from January 2025 and the show will be named, Ash, Luttsy & Nikki Osborne.

Mitch Lewis, the son of NRL legend Wally Lewis), joined the program as an assistant producer before moving into an on‑air role as sports reporter, a position he held from March 2008 until April 2026.

Ashleigh Smith is the program’s Executive Producer, supported by Chris “Buzz” Bezzina as Program Manager and Lachlan Sands as Producer.

In December 2025, Nikki Osborne resigned live on air, and it was announced that Nick Allen-Ducat and Susie O’Neill would join the program, which was relaunched in 2026 as Nick, Luttsy & Susie O’Neill.

== Controversies ==
In June 2017, Lutteral made accusations on the show that comedy duo Hamish & Andy had stolen his idea for a show called Cracking Yarns which was used for True Story with Hamish & Andy. Lutteral said that he had shared his idea to Andy Lee three years prior during an encounter in New York City and later began filming a pilot for Channel Nine with co-host Bradnam which was never completed. A spokesman for Nine had denied the claims by Lutteral stating that "the program True Story with Hamish & Andy was conceived, and was in development by Radio Karate, over a year before Andy and Luttsy met in New York." On 8 June 2017 Lutteral apologised on the show over his claims that his idea was stolen. He said on the show "I fully accept now that that was not the case. I’ve now seen the concept document from 2013 developed by Hamish and Andy’s team for True Story. It is clear to me that they had conceived and documented the format for True Story over a year before I met with Andy in New York."
