= The Block season 7 =

The Block
- Season 7
- No. of episodes: 68

Release
- Original network: Nine Network
- Original release: 12 May – 28 July 2013

Season chronology
- ← Previous; Season 6 Next → Season 8

The seventh season of Australian reality television series The Block, titled The Block: Sky High, premiered on Sunday, 12 May 2013 at 6:30 pm on the Nine Network. Scott Cam (host) and Shelley Craft (Challenge Master) returned from the previous season, as did the three judges: Neale Whitaker, Shaynna Blaze and Darren Palmer. Production for the series returned to Melbourne, which was the location for the fifth seasons, in the suburb of South Melbourne.

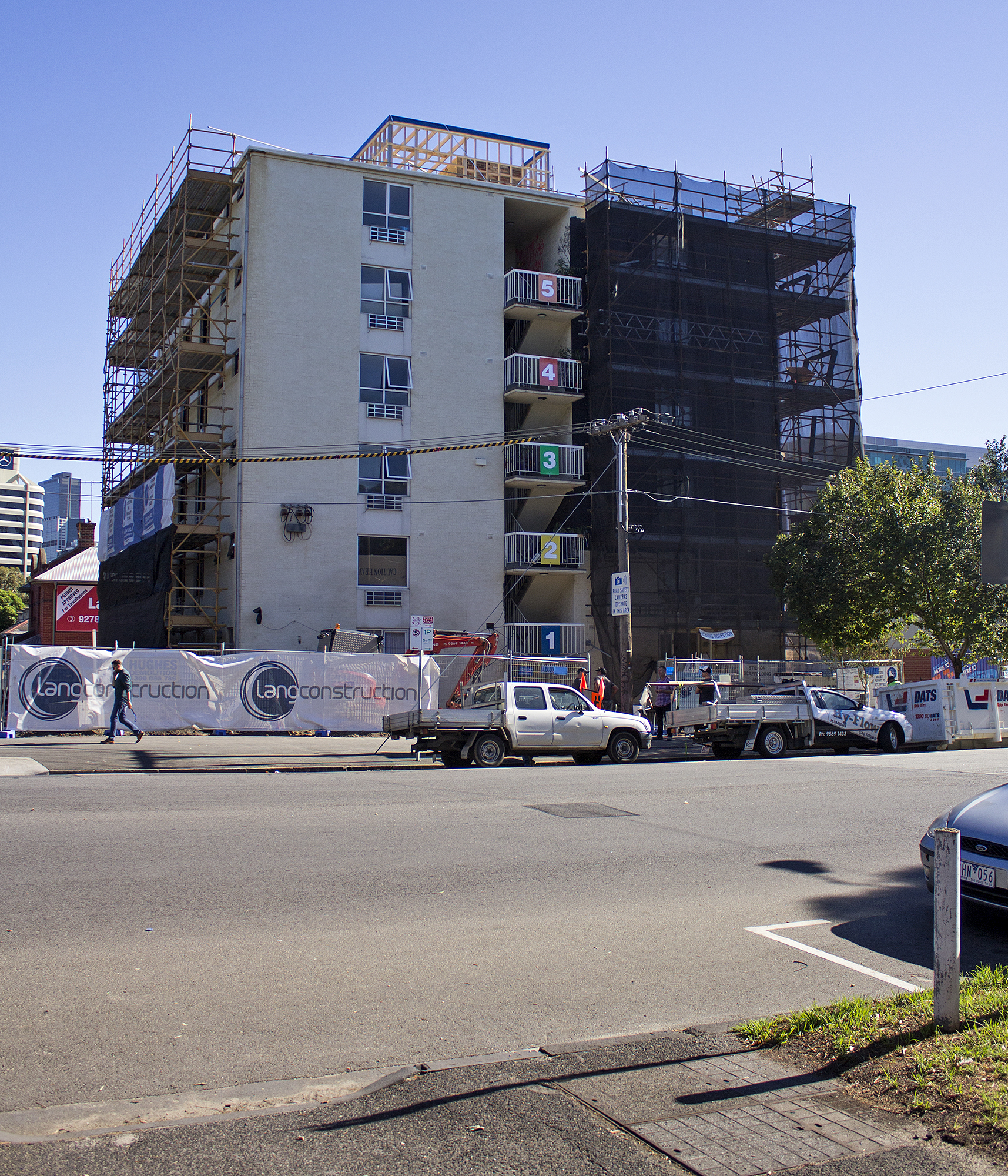
"The Block" under construction

== Contestants ==
This season introduces five couples (an increase from the four couples in preceding seasons) with each couple originating from a different state of Australia. The couples selected were as follows:

Apt	Couple	Location	Relationship	Occupations
1	Alisa and Lysandra Fraser	Adelaide, SA	Identical twin sisters	Police officers
2	Matt and Kim Di Costa	Perth, WA	Engaged	Studying Architecture and Primary School Teacher
3	Bec and George Douros	Melbourne, Vic	Married	Beauty Therapist and Bricklayer
4	Madi and Jarrod Coppock	Sydney, NSW	Married	Freelance Graphic Designer and Carpenter
5	Trixie and Mark "Johnno" Johnson	Brisbane, Qld	Married with 3 kids	Stay-at-home mum and Electrician/Sign Writer

== Score history ==
Teams' progress through the competition
Scores:	Teams				
Scores:	Alisa & Lysandra	Matt & Kim	Bec & George	Madi & Jarrod	Trixie & Johno
Rooms	Scores				
1st Guest Bedroom & Ensuite	20	15	22	20	21½
Ensuite	27½	25½	27½	24	26½
Master Bedroom & Dressing Room	28	27	26	24	25
2nd Guest Bedroom & Ensuite	27	29	24	29½	26
Kitchen/Pantry/Bar	28	25	27	26½	28½
Living/Dining Room	56½	64	54	52½	62½
Foyer & Laundry	24½	23½	20	20	23
Indoor Terrace & Re-do	27	29	26½	24½	16
Rooftop Foyer & Exterior	29½	26	23	23	25½
Ground Level - Reveal 1	20	24½	27½	28	25½
Ground Level - Reveal 2	30	28	26	27	25½
Auction Order	1st	5th	4th	3rd	2nd
Auction Result	1st	3rd	4th	2nd	5th

== Results ==
=== Room Reveals ===
Week	Room	Result				
Week	Room	Room Winner	2nd Couple	3rd Couple	4th Couple	Last Couple
1	1st Guest Bedroom & Ensuite	Bec & George	Trixie & Johno	Alisa & Lysandra	Matt & Kim	—N/a
1	1st Guest Bedroom & Ensuite	Bec & George	Trixie & Johno	Madi & Jarrod	Matt & Kim	—N/a
2	"His & Her" Ensuite Bathrooms	Alisa & Lysandra	Trixie & Johno	Matt & Kim	Madi & Jarrod	—N/a
2	"His & Her" Ensuite Bathrooms	Bec & George	Trixie & Johno	Matt & Kim	Madi & Jarrod	—N/a
3	Master Bedroom & Dressing Room	Alisa & Lysandra	Matt & Kim	Bec & George	Trixie & Johno	Madi & Jarrod
4	2nd Guest Bedroom & Ensuite	Madi & Jarrod	Matt & Kim	Alisa & Lysandra	Trixie & Johno	Bec & George
5	Kitchen, Pantry & Bar	Trixie & Johno	Alisa & Lysandra	Bec & George	Madi & Jarrod	Matt & Kim
6	Living & Dining Room	Matt & Kim	Trixie & Johno	Alisa & Lysandra	Bec & George	Madi & Jarrod
7	Foyer & Laundry Room	Alisa & Lysandra	Matt & Kim	Trixie & Johno	Bec & George	—N/a
7	Foyer & Laundry Room	Alisa & Lysandra	Matt & Kim	Trixie & Johno	Madi & Jarrod	—N/a
8	Indoor Terrace & Re-do	Matt & Kim	Alisa & Lysandra	Bec & George	Madi & Jarrod	Trixie & Johno
9	Rooftop Foyer & Exterior	Alisa & Lysandra	Matt & Kim	Trixie & Johno	Bec & George	—N/a
9	Rooftop Foyer & Exterior	Alisa & Lysandra	Matt & Kim	Trixie & Johno	Madi & Jarrod	—N/a
10	Ground Level - Room 1	Madi & Jarrod	Bec & George	Trixie & Johno	Matt & Kim	Alisa & Lysandra
11	Ground Level - Room 2	Alisa & Lysandra	Matt & Kim	Madi & Jarrod	Bec & George	Trixie & Johno

=== Judges' Scores ===
Summary of judges' scores
Week	Area(s)	Scores	Alisa & Lysandra	Matt & Kim	Bec & George	Madi & Jarrod	Trixie & Johno
1	1st Guest Bedroom & Ensuite	Darren	7	7	7	7	7½
1	1st Guest Bedroom & Ensuite	Shaynna	7	4	7½	6½	7
1	1st Guest Bedroom & Ensuite	Neale	6	4	7½	6½	7
1	1st Guest Bedroom & Ensuite	Total	20	15	22	20	21½
2	"His & Her" Ensuite Bathrooms	Darren	9	8½	9	8½	9½
2	"His & Her" Ensuite Bathrooms	Shaynna	9	8½	9½	8	8½
2	"His & Her" Ensuite Bathrooms	Neale	9½	8½	9	7½	8½
2	"His & Her" Ensuite Bathrooms	Total	27½	25½	27½	24	26½
3	Master Bedroom & Dressing Room	Darren	9½	9½	9	8½	8½
3	Master Bedroom & Dressing Room	Shaynna	9	8½	8½	8	8½
3	Master Bedroom & Dressing Room	Neale	9½	9	8½	7½	8
3	Master Bedroom & Dressing Room	Total	28	27	26	24	25
4	2nd Guest Bedroom & Ensuite	Darren	9½	10	8	10	9
4	2nd Guest Bedroom & Ensuite	Shaynna	8½	9½	8	9½	8½
4	2nd Guest Bedroom & Ensuite	Neale	9	9½	8	10	8½
4	2nd Guest Bedroom & Ensuite	Total	27	29	24	29½	26
5	Kitchen, Pantry & Bar	Darren	9½	9½	9	9½	9½
5	Kitchen, Pantry & Bar	Shaynna	9	7½	8½	8	9
5	Kitchen, Pantry & Bar	Neale	9½	8½	9½	9	10
5	Kitchen, Pantry & Bar	Total	28	25	27	26½	28½
6	Living & Dining Room	Darren	8	9½	7½	7	9½
6	Living & Dining Room	Shaynna	8½	10	7½	7½	9½
6	Living & Dining Room	Neale	8½	10	8	7½	9
6	Living & Dining Room	Blockheads^1	31½	34½	31	30	34½
6	Living & Dining Room	Total	56½	64	54	52½	62½
7	Foyer & Laundry Room	Darren	8½	9	7	7	8½
7	Foyer & Laundry Room	Shaynna	8	7½	7	7	7½
7	Foyer & Laundry Room	Neale	8^2	7^2	6^2	6^2	6^2
7	Foyer & Laundry Room	Total	24½	23½	20	20	23
8	Indoor Terrace & Re-do^3	Darren	9	9	8½	8	5
8	Indoor Terrace & Re-do^3	Shaynna	9½	10	9	8	6
8	Indoor Terrace & Re-do^3	Neale	8½	10	9	8½	5
8	Indoor Terrace & Re-do^3	Total	27	29	26½	24½	16
9	Rooftop Foyer & Exterior	Darren	9½	8½	8	8	8½
9	Rooftop Foyer & Exterior	Shaynna	10	8½	8	8	8½
9	Rooftop Foyer & Exterior	Neale	10	9	7	7	8½
9	Rooftop Foyer & Exterior	Total	29½	26	23	23	25½
10	Ground Level - Room 1	Darren	7½	9	9	9½	9
10	Ground Level - Room 1	Shaynna	6½	7½	9½	9	8
10	Ground Level - Room 1	Neale	6½	8	9	9½	8½
10	Ground Level - Room 1	Total	20	24½	27½	28	25½
11	Ground Level - Room 2	Darren	10	9½	8½	9½	8½
11	Ground Level - Room 2	Shaynna	10	9	9	8½	8½
11	Ground Level - Room 2	Neale	10	9½	8½	9	8½
11	Ground Level - Room 2	Total	30	28	26	27	25½

- ^1 The Block contestants were told to score each other's rooms. The scores were then tallied up to give a total "Blockheads" score which was then added to the judges' scores.
- ^2 John McGrath filled in for Neale Whitaker in judging the rooms this week.
- ^3 The prize for this week, is a trip to Lizard Island for 2 nights instead of $10,000 cash. Panic Room - as their second room for the week, they were told to redo the room that the judges disliked the most:-
  - Alisa and Lysandra - Guest Bedroom #1
  - Matt and Kim - Guest Bedroom #1
  - Bec and George - Study Room
  - Madi and Jarrod - Foyer
  - Trixie and Johnno - Dressing Room

=== Challenge Scores ===
Summary of challenge scores
Week	Challenge	Reward	Alisa & Lysandra	Matt & Kim	Bec & George	Madi & Jarrod	Trixie & Johno
1	Hotel Room	Pick which level they want	5th	4th	3rd	2nd	1st
1	Unique Bedhead^1	$5000	1st	-	-	-	1st
2	Tough Mudder & Dunny	$5000	-	-	-	1st	-
3	Screen Printed Furniture	$3000 & 2 Safety Deposit Keys	-	1st	-	-	-
4	Baby Brain (Nursery)	$5000	-	1st	-	-	-
5	Market Stall - Design^2	3 Keys (1st) + 2 Keys (2nd)	2nd	-	-	-	1st
5	Market Stall - Sales^2	$5000	$2,962	$2,815	$2,348	$1,283	$862
6	Gorilla Play Equipment	$5000	-	-	-	-	1st
6	Caulfield Races - Catwalk	2 Safety Deposit Keys	-	-	1st^3	-	-
6	Caulfield Races - Novelty Race^4	$3000 (1st), $1500 (2nd), $500 (3rd)	1st	3rd	4th	2nd	5th
7	Billy Cart Bandits - Design	$2000	-	-	-	-	1st
7	Billy Cart Bandits - Race^5	$2000	5th	2nd	4th	1st	3rd
7	History in a Box Art	$5000 painting from Mars Gallery Melbourne	-	1st	-	-	-
8	Myer Window Display^6	$10000 + $1000 for 1st	45 Votes ($1010)^7	56 Votes ($1010)^7	198 Votes ($3960 + $1000)	138 Votes ($2760)	38 Votes ($760)
8	Digging For Keys	Each key found opens a safety deposit box with prize inside	1	2	0	5	0
9	Historical room display	$5000 and advice from Neil	1st				
10	Video presentation	$5000			1st		

- ^1 The contestants had to use the bedhead they made, in one of the bedrooms of their apartment. Since there were two winners, they took home $2,500 each.
- ^2 Contestants were given $3,000 to open their own stall. They got to keep any amount they made over the three days the stalls were open. The teams made a total of $10,270 over the three days. Five safety deposit box keys were also up for grabs for the best designed/dressed stall. The winner got three safety deposit keys, the runner-up was given two keys.
- ^3 George and Jarrod went on the catwalk as a couple, and ended up with 1 key each. Bec and Madi were thus forced to be a couple for the catwalk.
- ^4 The contestants raced on the home straight inside a zorb ball on Family Day at the Caulfield Races.
- ^5 Cutouts of Scott Cam were placed along the race track, cutout also had a prize, being a tradie for a day:-
  - Alisa and Lysandra - Plumber
  - Matt and Kim - None
  - Bec and George - Tiler
  - Madi and Jarrod - Plaster
  - Trixie and Johnno - Sparky (Electrician), Carpenter
- ^6 The $10,000 prize money was split between the levels depending on the number of votes that they received. The amount that each team received is listed in brackets after the number of votes they received. Each vote was worth $20; 25 'votes' went missing, so the total amount won is $500 short.
- ^7 Alisa and Lysandra & Matt and Kim joined forces and agreed to split the money they both won 50/50.

== Auction ==
Auction results
Rank	Couple	Reserve	Auction Result	Profit	Total Winnings	Auction Order
1	Alisa & Lysandra	$1.140m	$1.435m	$295,000	$395,000	1st
2	Madi & Jarrod	$1.310m	$1.601m	$291,000	$291,000	3rd
3	Matt & Kim	$1.205m	$1.455m	$250,000	$250,000	5th
4	Bec & George	$1.265m	$1.507m	$242,000	$242,000	4th
5	Johnno & Trixie	$1.400m	$1.605m	$205,000	$205,000	2nd

• Alisa & Lysandra win the block with $4000 profit lead over Madi & Jarrod

== Ratings ==
Colour key:
– Highest rating episode and week during the series
– Lowest rating episode and week during the series

Week	Episode		Original airdate	Viewers (millions)^{[a]}	Nightly rank^{[a]}	Source	Week Avg
1	1	"Meeting the Teams"	12 May 2013	1.312	#4		1.143
1	2	"First Challenge"	13 May 2013	1.281	#3		1.143
1	3	"Room Reveal"	14 May 2013	1.308	#2		1.143
1	4	"Reality Sets In"	15 May 2013	1.062	#4		1.143
1	5	"Shelley's First Challenge"	16 May 2013	1.041	#4		1.143
1	6	"The Block Unlocked"	16 May 2013	0.853	#9		1.143
2	7	"Room Reveal"	19 May 2013	1.524	#3		1.169
2	8	"Steam Rooms"	20 May 2013	1.241	#4		1.169
2	9	"Leaks, Lies and Secret Weapons"	21 May 2013	1.196	#4		1.169
2	10	"Tough Mudder Challenge"	22 May 2013	1.156	#5		1.169
2	11	"Paint Roller Wars"	23 May 2013	1.073	#4		1.169
2	12	"The Block Unlocked"	23 May 2013	0.821	#10		1.169
3	13	"His and Hers Ensuite Room Reveal"	26 May 2013	1.476	#2		1.198
3	14	"Teams Team Up"	27 May 2013	1.394	#3		1.198
3	15	"A Birthday"	28 May 2013	1.244	#4		1.198
3	16	"Shelley Challenge"	29 May 2013	1.178	#3		1.198
3	17	"Master Bedroom and Dressing Room"	30 May 2013	1.087	#3		1.198
3	18	"The Block Unlocked"	30 May 2013	0.807	#12		1.198
4	19	"Master Bedroom and Dressing Room Reveal"	2 June 2013	1.612	#1		1.269
4	20	"Return to The Block"	3 June 2013	1.459	#2		1.269
4	21	"Bedhead Bedlam Begins"	4 June 2013	1.183	#3		1.269
4	22	"The Return of Number 3"	5 June 2013	1.302	#5		1.269
4	23	"Baby Brain Challenge and Madi vs Matt"	6 June 2013	1.160	#3		1.269
4	24	"The Block Unlocked"	6 June 2013	0.899	#7		1.269
5	25	"Guest Bedroom and Ensuite Room Reveal"	9 June 2013	1.300	#2		1.256
5	26	"Open for Inspections"	10 June 2013	1.466	#5		1.256
5	27	"Challenges and Cheats"	11 June 2013	1.242	#3		1.256
5	28	"The Candle Scandal Continues"	12 June 2013	1.367	#2		1.256
5	29	"Kitchen Week Controversy"	13 June 2013	1.276	#2		1.256
5	30	"The Block Unlocked"	13 June 2013	0.886	#9		1.256
6	31	"Kitchen Reveal"	16 June 2013	1.628	#1		1.248
6	32	"Living and Dining Room Demolition Begins"	17 June 2013	1.493	#3		1.248
6	33	"The Halfway Mark"	18 June 2013	1.131	#4		1.248
6	34	"Living Rooms"	19 June 2013	1.233	#2		1.248
6	35	"Living and Dining Rooms"	20 June 2013	1.174	#3		1.248
6	36	"The Block Unlocked"	20 June 2013	0.827	#10		1.248
7	37	"Room Reveal"	23 June 2013	1.653	#1		1.267
7	38	"Living and Dining Room Demolition Begins"	24 June 2013	1.369	#4		1.267
7	39	"The Halfway Mark"	25 June 2013	1.191	#4		1.267
7	40	"Living Rooms"	26 June 2013	1.504	#3		1.267
7	41	"Living and Dining Rooms"	27 June 2013	1.162	#2		1.267
7	42	"The Block Unlocked"	28 June 2013	0.721	#7		1.267
8	43	"Foyer and Laundry Room Reveal"	30 June 2013	1.503	#2		1.278
8	44	"The Last Room of The Apartment: Terrace Begins"	1 July 2013	1.227	#5		1.278
8	45	"Myer Challenge"	2 July 2013	1.292	#5		1.278
8	46	"Reality Hump Day"	3 July 2013	1.355	#1		1.278
8	47	"Terraces"	4 July 2013	1.237	#3		1.278
8	48	"The Block Unlocked"	4 July 2013	1.058	#5		1.278
9	49	"Terrace and Re-do Room Reveal"	7 July 2013	1.636	#1		1.362
9	50	"Team Work Together"	8 July 2013	1.485	#2		1.362
9	51	"Reality Rooftop and Entrance Foyer"	9 July 2013	1.446	#1		1.362
9	52	"Reality Rooftop and Entrance Foyer Update"	10 July 2013	1.345	#1		1.362
9	53	"Matt, The Foreman"	11 July 2013	1.266	#2		1.362
9	54	"The Block Unlocked"	11 July 2013	0.992	#6		1.362
10	55	"Family Time"	14 July 2013	1.758	#1		1.357
10	56	"Back to Renovating"	15 July 2013	1.447	#2		1.357
10	57	"Fighting with The Foreman"	16 July 2013	1.390	#1		1.357
10	58	"Real Estate Challenge"	17 July 2013	1.343	#4		1.357
10	59	"Keith's Soft Side"	18 July 2013	1.276	#2		1.357
10	60	"The Block Unlocked"	18 July 2013	0.930	#7		1.357
11	61	"Game Changing Prizes"	21 July 2013	1.548	#1		1.361
11	62	"The Final Week Begins"	22 July 2013	1.393	#3		1.361
11	63	"Keith The Problem Solver Foreman"	23 July 2013	1.372	#1		1.361
11	64	"Johno goes Sky High"	24 July 2013	1.335	#2		1.361
11	65	"The Final Scores are In"	25 July 2013	1.372	#1		1.361
11	66	"The Block Unlocked"	25 July 2013	1.146	#3		1.361
12	67	"Grand Final"	28 July 2013	2.132	#3		2.515
12	67	"Auctions"	28 July 2013	2.606	#2		2.515
12	67	"Winner Announced"	28 July 2013	2.808	#1		2.515
13	68	"Domestic blitz: block to the rescue"	4 August 2013	1.359	#4		1.359

- ^{a} Ratings data is from OzTAM and represents the live and same day average viewership from the 5 largest Australian metropolitan centres (Sydney, Melbourne, Brisbane, Perth and Adelaide).
