= Number-one ticket holder =

Person who holds membership tickets number 1 of a particular sporting club

A number-one ticket holder is a person who holds membership ticket #1 of a particular sporting club. Possession of the number one ticket is largely symbolic. The tradition of having a number-one ticket holder is mainly observed in Australia, and originated with the Australian Football League (AFL), the elite professional competition of Australian rules football. To increase the club's visibility and exposure, the ticket is often presented to a famous person or former athlete.

== Australian Football League ==
The Australian Football League is the premier Australian rules football competition in Australia. Most clubs nominate a single number one ticket holder each year.

Club	Ticket holder	Ref.
Adelaide Football Club	Guy Sebastian (2024–present)	
Brisbane Lions	Dan Anstey and Abby Coleman (2023–present)	
Carlton Football Club	Leisel Jones (2023–present) and Stephen Kernahan (2025–present)	
Collingwood Football Club	None	
Essendon Football Club	Kim Brennan (2017–present)	
Fremantle Football Club	Kevin Parker (2021–present)	
Geelong Football Club	Rebecca Maddern (2016–present)	
Gold Coast Football Club	Bruce Coulson and Jill Mathieson (2019–present)	
Greater Western Sydney Giants	Mitchell Starc and Alyssa Healy (2025–present)	
Hawthorn Football Club	Emma Race (2019–present) and John Kennedy Jr. (2017–present)	
Melbourne Football Club	Robert Flower (2011–?)	
North Melbourne Football Club	Ricky Ponting (2006–present)	
Port Adelaide Football Club	Teresa Palmer (2009–?)	
Richmond Football Club	Mick Molloy (2013–?), Ashleigh Barty (AFLW) (2020–present)	
St Kilda Football Club	Eric Bana (2010–present)	
Sydney Swans	Jason Kimberley (2025–present)	
West Coast Eagles	Jack Cowin (2025–present)	
Western Bulldogs	Alan Johnstone (2014–present)	

== National Rugby League ==
The National Rugby League is the premier rugby league competition in Australasia. Known dates are included in brackets.

Club	Ticket holder
Brisbane Broncos	Paul Tarlington (2014–24); Andrew Fraser ("until he left politics" in 2012); Kevin Rudd (2013–14)
Canterbury-Bankstown Bulldogs	Don Burke
Canberra Raiders	Mark Webber (2010); Brad Haddin (2005, 2009); Bob Hawke (1984, 1989)
Cronulla-Sutherland Sharks	Elle Macpherson (1994) Cathy Freeman; Peter Costello; Scott Morrison (2016)
Gold Coast Titans	None
Manly Warringah Sea Eagles	Gladys Berejiklian (2018)
Melbourne Storm	Molly Meldrum; Julia Gillard; Josh Frydenberg (2019)
Newcastle Knights	None
New Zealand Warriors	Peter "The Mad Butcher" Leitch
North Queensland Cowboys	None
Parramatta Eels	Danny Green
Penrith Panthers	Mark Geyer (2012–2016)
South Sydney Rabbitohs	Russell Crowe Phil Jamieson; Anthony Albanese
St. George Illawarra Dragons	John Howard
Sydney Roosters	Malcolm Turnbull
Wests Tigers	Binet Homes; Lee Hagipantelis (2014–15)

== A-League ==
The A-League is a professional men's soccer league in Australia and New Zealand.

Club	Ticket holder	Ref.
Central Coast Mariners	Julie Goodwin (2016–)	
Melbourne Heart FC	Jon Bon Jovi (2010; international)	
Melbourne Victory FC	George Calombaris (2015)	
Perth Glory FC	Lucy Sage (2011–2012) Dawn Fraser (2014–2015) Stephen Coniglio (2021–)	

== ANZ Championship ==
The ANZ Championship was the premier netball league in Australia and New Zealand that existed between 2008 and 2016.

Club	Ticket holder	Ref.
Queensland Firebirds	Anna Bligh (2008)	

== National Basketball League ==
The National Basketball League (NBL) is the premier professional basketball league in Australia and New Zealand.

Club	Ticket holder	Ref.
Sydney Kings	Dominic Perrottet (2021)	

== Suncorp Super Netball ==
Suncorp Super Netball is the premier professional netball league in Australia. The inaugural season commenced in February 2017.

Club	Ticket holder	Ref.
Melbourne Vixens	Anthony McDonald-Tipungwuti and Jane McDonald (2020)	
West Coast Fever	Nadia Mitsopoulos (2020)	

== See also ==
- Fan (person) § Sports
