= The Block season 4 =

The Block
- Season 4
- No. of episodes: 51

Release
- Original network: Nine Network
- Original release: 20 June – 21 August 2011

Season chronology
- ← Previous; Season 3 Next → Season 5

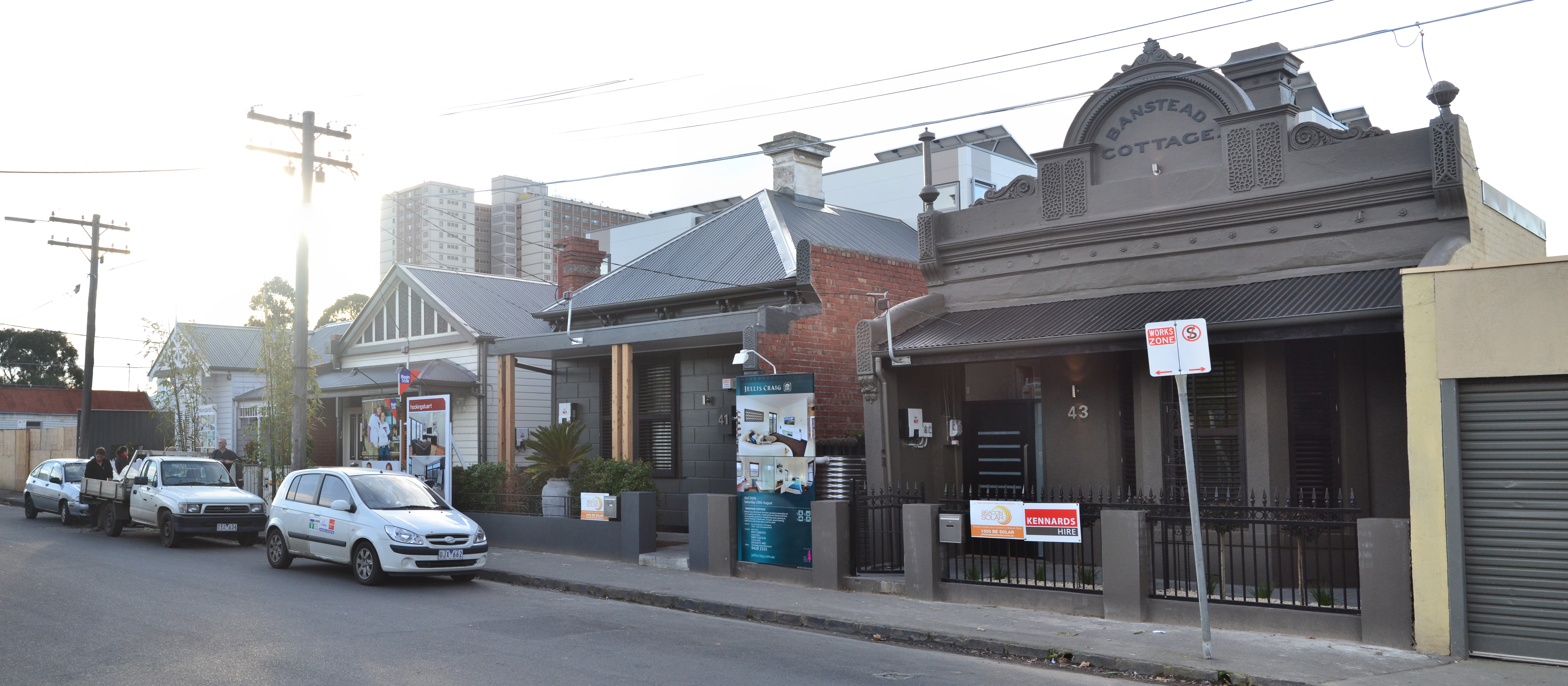
A panorama of the 4 renovated houses, taken 3 weeks prior to auction. (Pictured left to right, blue (Josh & Jenna), yellow (Polly & Waz), green (Katrina & Amie) and red (Rod & Tania))

The fourth season of Australian reality television series The Block, titled The Block 2011, aired on the Nine Network. Scott Cam returned as host as did John McGrath & Neale Whitaker as judges and Shelley Craft joined the season as "Challenge Master". The season premiered on Monday, 20 June 2011 at 7:00 pm.

Unlike previous series, the fourth season was filmed in Melbourne rather than Sydney, with the four houses to be renovated located in the inner-city suburb of Richmond.

The season was ultimately won by Polly Porter and Warwick "Waz" Jones, who were the only couple to sell their property at auction.

== The Block: Unlocked ==
The Block: Unlocked is a new format hosted by Shelley Craft which shares a personal insight into The Block transformations as the couples guide us through their completed rooms, it also includes behind the scenes footage and footage not seen on TV.

== Contestants ==
=== Elimination rounds ===
Couple (ages)	Relationship	State
Tania (39) and Rod (38) Walsh	Childhood sweethearts	Victoria
Chris and Carrie (both 27)	Newlyweds	New South Wales
Jenna Whitehead(23) and Josh Densten (24)	Engaged in the finale of The Block	Victoria
Chrissy (30) and Toby (32)	Husband and wife	Queensland
Polly Porter (24) and Warwick "Waz" Jones (27)	City girl and country boy	New South Wales
Aaron East (27) and Shannon McLeod (31)	Tradie and his lady	Western Australia
Katrina Chambers (33) and Amie Godde (31)	Sisters	New South Wales
Laura and Emily Sayers (both 25)	Twins	Victoria

Green: This couple won an elimination challenge and became a couple on the Block 2011.

Red: This couple failed to win an elimination challenge and did not become a Block couple.

=== Season Contestants ===
House	Couple	Ages	Relationship	State
1	Jenna Whitehead and Josh Densten	23 & 24	Engaged (at auction)	VIC
2	Polly Porter and Warwick "Waz" Jones	24 & 27	City Girl and Country Boy	NSW
3	Katrina Chambers and Amie Godde	33 & 31	Sisters	NSW
4	Rod and Tania Walsh	38 & 39	Childhood Sweethearts	VIC

== Score History ==
Teams' progress through the competition
Scores:	Teams			
Scores:	Josh & Jenna	Polly & Waz	Amie & Katrina	Rod & Tania
Rooms	Scores			
1st Bedroom	13½	9	13	11
2nd Bedroom	14	13	10	13
Bathroom/Laundry	12	13	13	15
Master Bedroom & Ensuite	33	33	28	29
Living Room/Hallway	12	13	17	16
Kitchen/Dining Room	18	15	17	16
Exterior	18	17	17	18½
Auction Order	1st	2nd	3rd	4th
Auction Result	3rd	1st	4th	2nd

== Scores ==
=== Summary ===
Wk.	Room(s)	Room Winner	Chumps	Challenges	
Wk.	Room(s)	Room Winner	Chumps	Shelley Craft	Scotty's Workshop
1	1st Bedroom	Josh & Jenna	n/a	Polly & Waz	Rod & Tania
2	2nd Bedroom	Josh & Jenna	n/a	Rod & Tania	Katrina & Amie
3	Bathroom/Laundry	Rod & Tania	Josh & Jenna		
4	Master Ensuite	Polly & Waz	Karina & Amie		Josh & Jenna
4	Ensuite	Josh & Jenna	Karina & Amie		Polly & Waz
5	Living Room/Hallway	Katrina & Amie	Josh & Jenna	Katrina & Amie	Rod & Tania
6	Kitchen/Dining Room	Josh & Jenna	Polly & Waz	Katrina & Amie	Rod & Tania
7	Exterior	Rod & Tania	n/a	Polly & Waz	

=== Judges' scores ===
Colour key:
Highest Score
Lowest Score

Summary of judges' scores
Week	Area(s)	Scores	Josh & Jenna	Polly & Waz	Katrina & Amie	Rod & Tania
1	1st Bedroom	Design	7.5	4	7	5
1	1st Bedroom	Execution	6	5	6	6
1	1st Bedroom	Total	13½	9	13	11
2	2nd Bedroom					
2	2nd Bedroom	Design	7	7	5	6
2	2nd Bedroom	Execution	7	6	5	7
2	2nd Bedroom	Total	14	13	10	13
3	Bathroom/Laundry					
3	Bathroom/Laundry	Design	7	7	7	7
3	Bathroom/Laundry	Execution	5	6	6	8
3	Bathroom/Laundry	Total	12	13	13	15
4	Master Bedroom					
4	Master Bedroom	Design	8	9	7	7
4	Master Bedroom	Execution	8	8	6	7
4	Master Bedroom	Total	16	17	13	14
5	Ensuite					
5	Ensuite	Design	9	8	8	8
5	Ensuite	Execution	8	8	7	7
5	Ensuite	Total	17	16	15	15
6	Living Room/Hallway					
6	Living Room/Hallway	Design	6	6	9	8
6	Living Room/Hallway	Execution	6	7	8	8
6	Living Room/Hallway	Total	12	13	17	16
7	Kitchen/Dining Room					
7	Kitchen/Dining Room	Design	9	7	8	8
7	Kitchen/Dining Room	Execution	9	8	9	8
7	Kitchen/Dining Room	Total	18	15	17	16
8	Exterior					
8	Exterior	Design	9	9	8	9
8	Exterior	Execution	9	8	9	9.5
8	Exterior	Total	18	17	17	18½

== Results ==
=== Elimination week ===
Elimination challenges (episodes 1–4)
#	Winning couple	Eliminated couple	Ref.
1	Jenna and Josh	Shannon and Aaron	
2	Polly and Waz	Chrissy and Toby	
3	Tania and Rod	Chris and Carrie	
4	Katrina and Amie	Laura and Emily	

The Key Challenge (episode 5)
Rank	Couple	House chosen	Ref.
1	Katrina and Amie	Number three (green door)	
2	Jenna and Josh	Number one (blue door)	
3	Rod and Tania	Number four (red door)	
4	Polly and Waz	Number two (yellow door)	

== Weeks ==
Event	Result
Week 1
Shelley Craft Challenge #1: "Run For Your Money"	The couples would race to collect five "red houses" hidden at five different locations around Melbourne. Each house was worth $5,000 in cash to go towards their renovating budget, and the first couple to collect all of their red houses would win the right to select any of the other couples' house as their own to renovate, or keep their current house. The winning couple was Polly and Waz. However, they decided to keep their own house.
Scotty's Workshop Challenge #1": "Wall To Wall"	The couples had two hours to construct an exact replica of a partition wall that Scott had built, as well as paint and hang four framed pictures (to the same dimensions as Scott's example). Guest judges, Mark and Duncan (from the previous season), assisted the couples with advice, and would provide a day's service as the prize. The winning couple was Tania and Rod.
Room Delivery Night #1: Bedroom 1	The winning couple was Jenna and Josh.
Week 2
Shelley Craft Challenge #2: "Trash To Treasure"	The couples had fifteen minutes, and a budget of up $100, to purchase a second-hand item that would then be fixed up in the space of four hours ready to sell at auction. The couple with the highest profit would win $1,000 to spend at an auction of their choice. The winning couple was Rod and Tania, with a profit of $135.
Scotty's Workshop Challenge #2": "New To Old"	The couples were set the task of distressing and painting a chest of drawers to achieve an "antique effect". Keeping in line with "second-hand week", the winning couple would select one of two boxes containing a prize, "old" or "new", with the runner-up receiving whatever prize that was in the other box. The winning couple, Katrina and Amie, selected the "old" box and received a vintage bottle of red wine and a crystal decanter, together worth $1,000, to use in their room. Runners-up Polly and Waz received the same prize to a lesser value of $100.
Room Delivery Night #2: Bedroom 2	The winning couple was Jenna and Josh.
Week 3
Shelley Craft Challenge #3: "Pipeworks"	The couples raced to connect a path of pipes, where the first couple who achieved running water from their tap, would win a night at The Langham, Melbourne. The winning couple was Jenna and Josh.
Scotty's Workshop Challenge #3": "On the Tiles"	The couples had fifteen minutes to select tiles to use to create a mosaic of their house in two hours. The couple that created a mosaic that most resembled their house, as adjudged by Scott, received either a free tiler or plumber for a day of work. The winning couple was Jenna and Josh.
Room Delivery Night #3: Bathroom/Laundry	The winning couple was Rod and Tania.
Week 4
Shelley Craft Challenge #4: "Puzzled Paper"	The couples had one hour to wallpaper a mobile billboard displaying an advertisement for the series with their pictures. The couple with the fewest imperfections, as judged by Scott and Shelley, would win $3,000. The winning couple was Katrina and Amie, who were then informed they would have to take their prize money from their fellow couples. Katrina and Amie decided to take $2,000 from Jenna and Josh, and $1,000 from Rod and Tania, representative of the rooms they had won to that point.
Scotty's Workshop Challenge #4": "Camberwell Markets"	The couples were divided into two teams: Jenna and Josh with Polly and Waz, Katrina and Amie with Rodney and Tania. Further expanding their teams were the eliminated couples from the elimination week challenges, with each eliminated couple forming a part of the team with the respective couples that eliminated them. Each team visited a Salvation Army store to collect items that would form a part of a stand they would run at the Camberwell Market, aiming to raise money for the Salvation Army. The team that raised the most money, would receive a $5,000 prize ($2,500 per couple), as well as the services of their eliminated team members for two days. The team of Jenna and Josh with Polly and Waz were the winners, raising $1,800 compared to $1,300 raised by Katrina and Amie with Rodney and Tania. The eliminated couples that returned for the two days were Shannon and Aaron (for Jenna and Josh), and Chrissy and Toby (for Polly and Waz).
Room Delivery Night #4: Main bedroom/Ensuite	There was a tie for the double room delivery, with Polly and Waz and Jenna and Josh both scoring 33/40. Polly and Waz achieved their score through a 17/20 for their master bedroom, whereas Jenna and Josh scored 17/20 for their ensuite; both couples scored 16/20 for the other room. As it was a double room delivery, both couples received $5,000, split from the original $10,000 prize.

== Auction ==
Auction results
Rank	Couple	Reserve	Auction Result	Amount sold for after Auction	Profit made	Total Profit	Auction Order
1	Polly and Waz	$840,000	$855,000	—	$15,000	$115,000	2nd
2	Rod and Tania	$850,000	$832,000^{[c]}	$922,000	$72,000	$72,000	4th
3	Josh and Jenna	$950,000	$901,000^{[c]}	$1.000m	$50,000	$50,000	1st
4	Amie and Katrina	$860,000	$822,000^{[c]}	$860,000	$0		3rd

== Reception ==
=== Ratings ===
Colour key:
– Highest rating episode and week during the series
– Lowest rating episode and week during the series

Week	Episode		Original airdate	Timeslot	Viewers (millions)^{1}	Nightly rank^{1}	Source	Weekly Avg
1	1	"Elimination Night 1"	20 June 2011	Monday 7:00 pm–8:00 pm	1.342	#4		1.044^{[a]}
1	2	"Elimination Night 2"	21 June 2011	Tuesday 7:00 pm–7:30 pm	1.114	#10		1.044^{[a]}
1	3	"Elimination Night 3"	22 June 2011	Wednesday 7:00 pm–7:30 pm	1.186	#4		1.044^{[a]}
1	4	"Elimination Night 4"	23 June 2011	Thursday 7:00 pm–8:00 pm	1.139	#3		1.044^{[a]}
1	5	"The Key Challenge"	24 June 2011	Friday 7:00 pm–7:30 pm	1.039	#4		1.044^{[a]}
2	6	"Moving in to The Block"	27 June 2011	Monday 7:00 pm–8:00 pm	1.440	#2		1.301
2	7	"Shelley Craft Challenge #1"	28 June 2011	Tuesday 7:00 pm–7:30 pm	1.337	#3		1.301
2	8	"Day 10"	29 June 2011	Wednesday 7:00 pm–7:30 pm	1.275	#3		1.301
2	9	"Scotty's Workshop Challenge #1"	30 June 2011	Thursday 7:00 pm–8:00 pm	1.188	#2		1.301
2	10	"Scotty and Shelley's Progress Report #1"	1 July 2011	Friday 7:00 pm–7:30 pm	1.153	#2		1.301
3	11	"Room Delivery Night #1"	4 July 2011	Monday 7:00 pm–8:00 pm	1.470	#2		1.340
3	12	"Shelley Craft Challenge #2"	5 July 2011	Tuesday 7:00 pm–7:30 pm	1.372	#3^{[b]}		1.340
3	13	"Day 17"	6 July 2011	Wednesday 7:00 pm–7:30 pm	1.390	#6		1.340
3	14	"Scotty's Workshop Challenge #2"	7 July 2011	Thursday 7:00 pm–8:00 pm	1.291	#3		1.340
3	15	"Scotty and Shelley's Progress Report #2"	8 July 2011	Friday 7:00 pm–7:30 pm	1.179	#2		1.340
4	16	"Room Delivery Night #2"	11 July 2011	Monday 7:00 pm–8:00 pm	1.552	#2		1.302
4	17	"Shelley Craft Challenge #3"	12 July 2011	Tuesday 7:00 pm–7:30 pm	1.354	#4		1.302
4	18	"Day 24"	13 July 2011	Wednesday 7:00 pm–8:00 pm	1.308	#3		1.302
4	19	"Scotty's Workshop Challenge #3 / Progress Report #3"	14 July 2011	Thursday 7:00 pm–8:00 pm	1.168	#3		1.302
4	20	"The Block Unlocked #1"	15 July 2011	Friday 7:00 pm–7:30 pm	1.130	#2		1.302
5	21	"Room Delivery Night #3"	17 July 2011	Sunday 6:30 pm–7:30 pm	1.593	#4		1.323
5	22	"Shelley Craft Challenge #4"	18 July 2011	Monday 7:00 pm–8:00 pm	1.364	#3		1.323
5	23	"Day 30"	19 July 2011	Tuesday 7:00 pm–7:30 pm	1.340	#5		1.323
5	24	"Day 31"	20 July 2011	Wednesday 7:00 pm–8:00 pm	1.242	#3		1.323
5	25	"Scotty's Workshop Challenge #4 / Progress Report #4"	21 July 2011	Thursday 7:00 pm–8:00 pm	1.265	#3		1.323
5	26	"The Block Unlocked #2"	22 July 2011	Friday 7:00 pm–7:30 pm	1.136	#3		1.323
6	27	"Room Delivery Night #4"	17 July 2011	Sunday 6:30 pm–7:30 pm	1.836	#1		1.438
6	28	"Shelley Craft Challenge #5"	25 July 2011	Monday 7:00 pm–8:00 pm	1.486	#2		1.438
6	29	"Day 37"	26 July 2011	Tuesday 7:00 pm–7:30 pm	1.518	#2		1.438
6	30	"Day 38"	27 July 2011	Wednesday 7:00 pm–7:30 pm	1.352	#3		1.438
6	31	"Scotty's Workshop Challenge #5 / Progress Report #5"	28 July 2011	Thursday 7:00 pm–8:00 pm	1.296	#3		1.438
6	32	"The Block Unlocked #3"	29 July 2011	Friday 7:00 pm–7:30 pm	1.139	#2		1.438
7	33	"Room Delivery Night #5"	31 July 2011	Sunday 6:30 pm–7:30 pm	1.737	#2		1.362
7	34	"Shelley Craft Challenge #6"	1 August 2011	Monday 7:00 pm–8:00 pm	1.396	#3		1.362
7	35	"Day 44"	2 August 2011	Tuesday 7:00 pm–7:30 pm	1.373	#5		1.362
7	36	"Day 45"	3 August 2011	Wednesday 7:00 pm–7:30 pm	1.250	#4		1.362
7	37	"Scotty's Workshop Challenge #6 / Progress Report #6"	4 August 2011	Thursday 7:00 pm–8:00 pm	1.355	#2		1.362
7	38	"The Block Unlocked #4"	5 August 2011	Friday 7:00 pm–7:30 pm	1.061	#4		1.362
8	39	"Room Delivery Night #6"	7 August 2011	Sunday 6:30 pm–8:00 pm	1.432	#7		1.464
8	39	"Room Delivery Night #6"	7 August 2011	Sunday 6:30 pm–8:00 pm	1.823	#3		1.464
8	40	"Shelley Craft Challenge #7"	8 August 2011	Monday 7:00 pm–8:00 pm	1.549	#1		1.464
8	41	"Day 51"	9 August 2011	Tuesday 7:00 pm–8:00 pm	1.466	#1		1.464
8	42	"Day 52"	10 August 2011	Wednesday 7:00 pm–8:00 pm	1.392	#1		1.464
8	43	"Scotty's Workshop Challenge #7 / Progress Report #7"	11 August 2011	Thursday 7:00 pm–8:00 pm	1.424	#1		1.464
8	44	"The Block Unlocked #5"	12 August 2011	Friday 7:00 pm–7:30 pm	1.163	#3		1.464
9	45	"Room Delivery Night #7"	14 August 2011	Sunday 6:30 pm–7:30 pm	2.000	#1		1.456
9	46	"Final Room Delivery Results / Last Day"	15 August 2011	Monday 7:00 pm–8:00 pm	1.675	#1		1.456
9	47	"Where Are They Now?"	16 August 2011	Tuesday 7:00 pm–7:30 pm	1.399	#1		1.456
9	48	"Auction Order Challenge (Part 1)"	17 August 2011	Wednesday 7:00 pm–7:30 pm	1.311	#1		1.456
9	49	"Auction Order Challenge (Part 2)"	18 August 2011	Thursday 7:00 pm–8:00 pm	1.316	#1		1.456
9	50	"The Block Unlocked #6: Your Say"	19 August 2011	Friday 7:00 pm–7:30 pm	1.037	#5		1.456
10	51	"Grand Final"	21 August 2011	Sunday 6:30 pm–8:25 pm	2.283	#4		2.753
10	51	"Auction"	21 August 2011	Sunday 6:30 pm–8:25 pm	2.687	#2		2.753
10	51	"The Winner Announced"	21 August 2011	Sunday 8:25 pm–8:35 pm	3.289	#1		2.753

Notes:

1. Ratings data is from OzTAM and represents the live and same day average viewership from the 5 largest Australian metropolitan centres (Sydney, Melbourne, Brisbane, Perth and Adelaide).

== Notes ==
- ^{a} The first week's average was incorrectly coded to include a repeat episode, resulting in a lower figure. Without this error, the average is 1.18 million, and is ranked 19th in the weekly Top 100 programs.
- ^{b} Due to a coding error for Australia's Got Talent, The Block was originally ranked third in nightly figures. With its adjusted figures, Australia's Got Talent was ranked first, therefore relegating The Block to fourth position.
- ^{c} Passed in at auction, not sold
