= The Block season 1 =

Season of the Australian reality television series

The Block
- Season 1
- No. of episodes: 13

Release
- Original network: Nine Network
- Original release: 1 June – 17 August 2003

Season chronology
- Next → Season 2

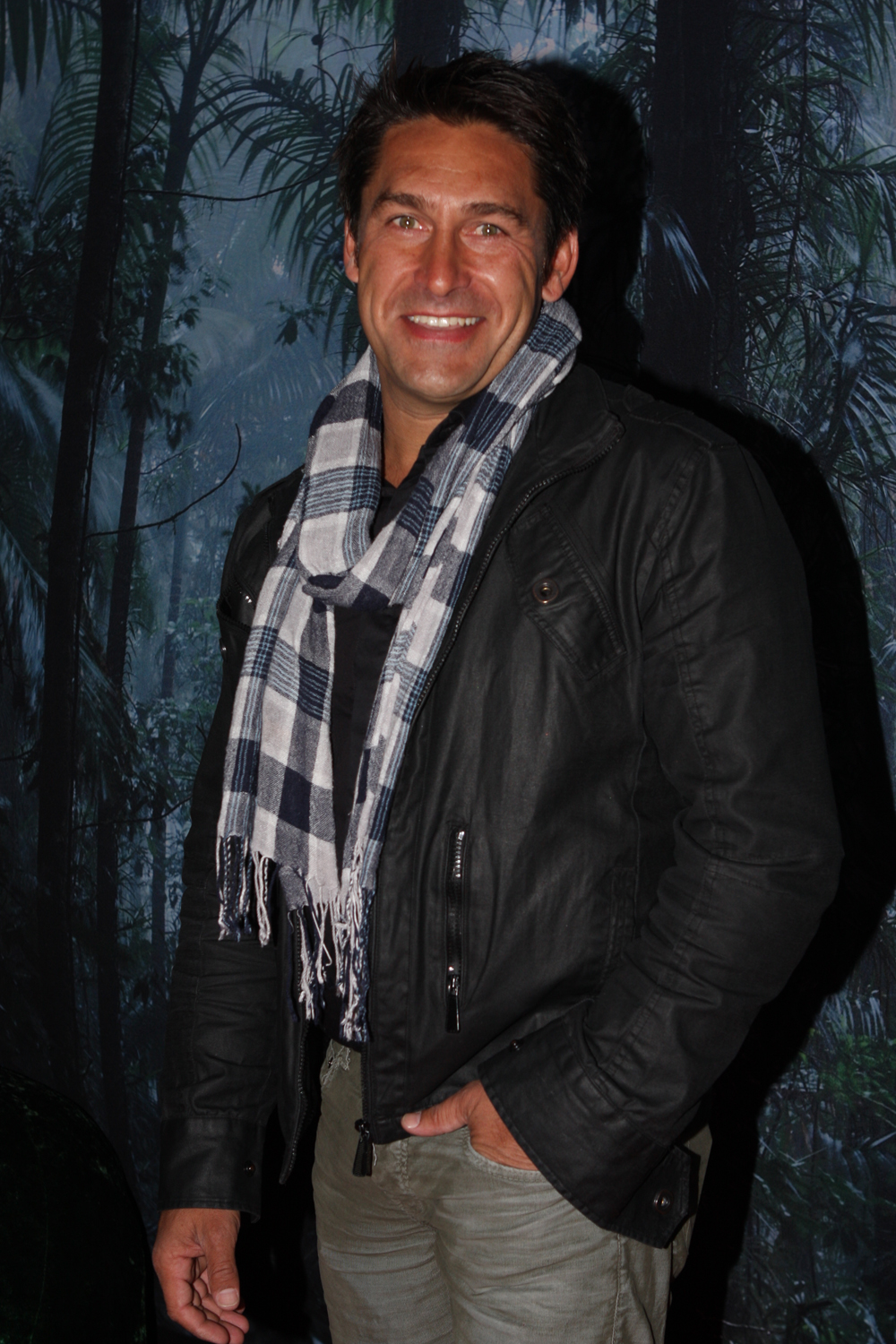
Jamie Durie host

The first season of Australian reality television series The Block, retroactively titled The Block 2003, aired on the Nine Network. Jamie Durie was announced as host and John McGrath was announced as Judge. The season premiered on 1 June 2003.

The first season of The Block began airing on 1 June 2003 on the Nine Network, replacing Backyard Blitz and Location Location in the network's flagship timeslot of Sunday at 6:30 to 7:30 pm (AEST). The series was presented by Backyard Blitz host Jamie Durie and filmed in Bondi, with the majority of filming being completed prior to the series airing for editing purposes.

== Contestants ==
Selected from approximately 2,000 applicants, the four couples in the series were:

- Adam Thorn (aged 30) and Fiona Mills (27), a married couple from Banksia. A data analyst and former sales representative, the couple had renovated three properties prior to competing on The Block. They renovated the first ground-floor apartment (flat number one) and were widely considered the "show favourites" throughout the course of the series. Their apartment—which was the last to be auctioned—sold for $751,000 earning them the highest profit of $156,000 as well as the winning prize of $100,000. Mills appeared on the cover of Ralph while the series was airing in July 2003.
- Warren Sonin (37) and Gavin Atkins (35), a sales manager and public relations manager from Elizabeth Bay.
- Paul (30) and Kylie Ingram (31), a plumber and travel agent married for two years
- Phil Rankine (33) and Amity Dry (24), marketing executive and singer married for a year from Kirribilli

The combined auction profits were $443,000.

== Room Wins ==
Couple	Room Wins
Adam & Fiona	2 / 5
Kylie & Paul	1.5 / 5
Gav & Waz	0.5 / 5
Phil & Amity	1 / 5

== Auction ==
Auction results
Rank	Couple	Apartment	Reserve	Auction Result	Profit	Total Winnings	Auction order	Buyer
1	Adam and Fiona	Flat 1 (Ground floor)	$595,000	$751,000	$156,000	$256,000	4th	Unidentified Sydney woman
2	Paul and Kylie	Flat 4 (Upstairs)	$595,000	$747,000	$152,000	$152,000	3rd	Sydney businessman, Wayne
3	Warren and Gavin	Flat 2 (Ground floor)	$595,000	$670,000	$75,000	$75,000	2nd	Crazy John's
4	Phil and Amity	Flat 3 (Upstairs)	$595,000	$655,000	$60,000	$60,000	1st	The Sun-Herald

== Reception ==
The first season was a ratings success with an average nightly reviewership of 2.239 million. The Grand Finale of the season had a viewership of 3.115 million viewers.
