= Connection Magazines =

Australian online and print publisher

Connection Magazines is an Australian online and print publisher. Its core interest is the publication of trade and consumer-focused magazines and online media in the building and construction sector. Connection Magazines also incorporates a market research division (Connection Research) and an events division (Connection Events), through which annual Australian industry forums are held. Connection Magazines also engages in advocacy for the various industries it covers and is a long-serving member of a variety of international trade organisations (such as the World Plumbing Council).

== History ==
Connection Magazines was originally called QUATSID Pty. Ltd., but also traded as Patchell Publishing Pty. Ltd. and Jeff Patchell Pty. Ltd. before adopting the name 'Connection Magazines' in June 2000.

=== Trade publications ===
The company was founded by Jeff Patchell in 1985 with the launch of Plumbing Connection magazine. The business has since expanded to include other trade magazine titles including, Electrical Connection, Building Connection, Business Connection, Cabling Connection, Retail Connection, Connected Home Australia, and Connected Home Middle East.

=== Consumer titles ===
In 2008, Connection Magazines began its first consumer-based website with the launch of its Connected Home website. This was followed in 2010 by the launch of BUILD, an online building and renovation resource for the Australian market. In 2011, the company launched its first consumer-focused magazine, Stunning Smart Homes, which was followed shortly thereafter by its second consumer magazine title ManSpace magazine.
