= The Block season 5 =

The Block
- Season 5
- No. of episodes: 68

Release
- Original network: Nine Network
- Original release: 16 April – 1 July 2012

Season chronology
- ← Previous; Season 4 Next → Season 6

The fifth season of Australian reality television series The Block, titled The Block 2012, aired on the Nine Network. Both Scott Cam returned as host and Shelley Craft as "Challenge Master". John McGrath & Neale Whitaker returned as judges and introduced new judge Shaynna Blaze and guest judge Darren Palmer. The season premiered on Monday, 16 April 2012 at 7:00 pm.

Like the previous season, this season was filmed in Melbourne, with the four houses to be renovated located in the inner-city suburb of South Melbourne at 401 Dorcas Street.

At first, this season wasn't to air in New Zealand, but has now been picked up by TV3 (the channel that broadcasts the New Zealand adaptation of the program). All four previous seasons have aired on Prime

This season was broadcast in the Netherlands in 2018 for the first time.

== Contestants ==
=== Elimination rounds ===
Couple (ages)	Relationship	State
Dan (28) and Dani (26)	Boyfriend and Girlfriend	Victoria
Brad (26) and Courtney (24)	Boyfriend and Girlfriend	Western Australia
Brad and Lara (Both 30)	Boyfriend and Girlfriend	New South Wales
Larry (51) and Jessie (22)	Father and daughter	Queensland
Sophie (24) and Dale (29)	Newlyweds	Victoria
Brendan and Michele (Both 22)	Newlyweds	Victoria
Mike (37) and Andrew (29)	Brothers	New South Wales
Brett (26) and Rana (46)	Mother and son	Victoria

Green: This couple won an elimination challenge and became a couple on The Block 2012.

Red: This couple failed to win an elimination challenge and did not become a Block couple.

== Scores ==
=== Summary ===
Week	Room(s)	Room Winner	Chumps	Challenges	
Week	Room(s)	Room Winner	Chumps	Shelley Craft	Scotty's Workshop
1	Front Room	Dan & Dani	Brad & Lara		Dan & Dani’s
2	Master Bedroom & Ensuite	Mike & Andrew	Dan & Dani		Brad & Lara
3	Guest Bedroom & Powder Room	Dan & Dani	Dale & Sophie	Dale & Sophie/Mike & Andrew	Dale & Sophie
4	Main Bathroom	Brad & Lara	Mike & Andrew		Brad & Lara
5	Guest Bedroom & Hallway	Dale & Sophie	Dan & Dani	Mike & Andrew/Dale & Sophie	Brad & Lara
6	Rooftop Terrace & Utility Room	Brad & Lara	Mike & Andrew	Brad & Lara/Dale & Sophie	Mike & Andrew
7	Living & Dining Room	Dan & Dani	Mike & Andrew	Dale & Sophie	N/A
7	Living & Dining Room	Dan & Dani	Brad & Lara	Dale & Sophie	N/A
8	Kitchen	Mike & Andrew	Dan & Dani		Dale & Sophie
8	Room Saver	Dale & Sophie	Mike & Andrew	Dale & Sophie	Dale & Sophie
9	Exterior	Dale & Sophie	Dan & Dani	Brad & Lara	—N/a
9	Exterior	Dale & Sophie	Dan & Dani	Dale & Sophie	—N/a

=== Judges' Scores ===
List indicator
- A * indicates that the team used one or more bonus points won previously to inflate their total score.

Summary of judges' scores
Week	Area(s)	Scores	Dale & Sophie	Mike & Andrew	Brad & Lara	Dan & Dani
1	Front Room	Shaynna	6	5	5	5
1	Front Room	John	5	5	5	6
1	Front Room	Neale	6	5½	5	6½
1	Front Room	Total	17	15½	15	17½
2	Master Bedroom & Ensuite	Shaynna	7	8	7½	6
2	Master Bedroom & Ensuite	Darren	7½	8	7½	6
2	Master Bedroom & Ensuite	Neale	8	8	8	6
2	Master Bedroom & Ensuite	Total	22½	24	23	18
3	Guest Bedroom & Powder Room	Lisa	7½	7½	7	7
3	Guest Bedroom & Powder Room	John	7	8	7½	7½
3	Guest Bedroom & Powder Room	Neale	7	7½	7½	8
3	Guest Bedroom & Powder Room	Total	21½	23	22	23½*
4	Main Bathroom	Shaynna	7	7	8	8
4	Main Bathroom	John	7	7	8	8
4	Main Bathroom	Neale	7½	7	9	8
4	Main Bathroom	Total	21½	21	26*	24
5	Guest Bedroom & Hallway	Shaynna	9	6½	7½	6
5	Guest Bedroom & Hallway	Darren	9	7	8	6½
5	Guest Bedroom & Hallway	Neale	9	6½	7½	6½
5	Guest Bedroom & Hallway	Total	27	20	23	19
6	Rooftop Terrace & Utility Room	Shaynna	7½	6	8	7
6	Rooftop Terrace & Utility Room	John	7	6	7½	6½
6	Rooftop Terrace & Utility Room	Neale	7	5	7	6
6	Rooftop Terrace & Utility Room	Total	21½	17	22½	19½
7	Living & Dining Room	Shaynna	8	7½	7½	7½
7	Living & Dining Room	John	7	7½	7½	8
7	Living & Dining Room	Neale	7	7½	7½	8
7	Living & Dining Room	Total	23*	22½	22½	24½*
8	Kitchen	Shaynna	9½	9	8½	8½
8	Kitchen	John	9½	9	8½	8
8	Kitchen	Neale	8½	8	8	8
8	Kitchen	Total	27½	28*	25	24½
9	Room Saver	Shaynna	8	6½	7½	7½
9	Room Saver	John	9	6½	7½	8
9	Room Saver	Neale	9	6	7	7
9	Room Saver	Total	26	19	22	23½
10	Exterior	Shaynna	9½	8½	9	8
10	Exterior	John	8½	9	8	8
10	Exterior	Neale	8½	8	7½	7½
10	Exterior	Total	26½	25½	24½	23½

== Results ==
=== Elimination week ===
Elimination challenges (episodes 1-4)

Order	Winning couple	Eliminated couple
1	Dani and Dan	Brad and Courtney
2	Brad and Lara	Larry and Jessie
3	Sophie and Dale	Brendan and Michele
4	Mike and Andrew	Brett and Rana

The Key Challenge (episode 5)

Rank	Couple	House chosen
1	Brad and Lara	Number three (green door)
2	Dani and Dan	Number four (red door)
3	Mike and Andrew	Number two (yellow door)
4	Sophie and Dale	Number one (blue door)

=== Room Reveals ===
Week	Room	Result			
Week	Room	Winning Couple	2nd Couple	3rd Couple	Chumps
1	Front Room	Dani and Dan	Sophie and Dale	Mike and Andrew	Brad and Lara
2	Master Bedroom and Ensuite	Mike and Andrew	Brad and Lara	Sophie and Dale	Dani and Dan
3	Guest Bedroom and Powder Room	Dani and Dan	Mike and Andrew	Brad and Lara	Sophie and Dale
4	Main Bathroom	Brad and Lara	Dani and Dan	Sophie and Dale	Mike and Andrew
5	Guest Bedroom and Hallway	Sophie and Dale	Brad and Lara	Mike and Andrew	Dani and Dan
6	Rooftop Terrace and Utility Room	Brad and Lara	Sophie and Dale	Dani and Dan	Mike and Andrew
7	Living and Dining Room	Dani and Dan	Sophie and Dale	-	Mike and Andrew Brad and Lara
8	Kitchen	Mike and Andrew	Sophie and Dale	Brad and Lara	Dani and Dan
8	Room Saver	Sophie and Dale	Dani and Dan	Brad and Lara	Mike and Andrew
9	Exterior	Sophie and Dale	Mike and Andrew	Brad and Lara	Dani and Dan
10	Challenge House	Sophie and Dale	Dani and Dan	Brad and Lara	Mike and Andrew

=== Auction ===
Auction results
Rank	Couple	Reserve	Auction Result	Profit	Total Winnings	Auction order
1	Brad and Lara	$1.114m	$1.620m	$506,000	$606,000	1st
2	Dan and Dani	$992,000	$1.440m	$448,000	$448,000	2nd
3	Mike and Andrew	$966,000	$1,400,001.01	$434,001.01	$434,001.01	4th
4	Dale and Sophie	$975,000	$1.330m	$355,000	$355,000	3rd

== Ratings ==
The Block Season 5 metropolitan viewership and nightly position Colour key: – Highest rating episode and week during the series – Lowest rating episode and week during the series
Week	Episode		Original airdate	Viewers (millions)^{[a]}	Nightly rank^{[a]}	Source	Week Avg
1	1	"Elimination Night 1"	16 April 2012	1.404	#2		1.072
1	2	"Elimination Night 2"	17 April 2012	1.308	#3		1.072
1	3	"Elimination Night 3"	18 April 2012	1.133	#5		1.072
1	4	"Elimination Night 4"	19 April 2012	1.099	#2		1.072
1	5	"House Decider Challenge"	20 April 2012	1.012	#2		1.072
1	6	"The Block Unlocked"	20 April 2012	0.478	#19		1.072
2	7	"Move into The Block"	23 April 2012	1.430	#2		1.099
2	8	"Shelley Craft's Challenge"	24 April 2012	1.270	#3		1.099
2	9	"Room 1 Renovations Continue"	25 April 2012	1.218	#5		1.099
2	10	"Scott's Workshop Challenge"	26 April 2012	1.109	#3		1.099
2	11	"Scott and Shelley walk around The Block"	27 April 2012	1.030	#3		1.099
2	12	"The Block Unlocked"	27 April 2012	0.537	#15		1.099
2	13	"Room Reveal"	29 April 2012	1.561	#1		1.256
3	14	"Shelley Craft's Challenge"	30 April 2012	1.400	#2		1.256
3	15	"Two-Room Week Continues"	1 May 2012	1.259	#3		1.256
3	16	"Scotty's Workshop Challenge"	2 May 2012	1.136	#5		1.256
3	17	"Scott and Shelley walk around The Block"	3 May 2012	1.151	#2		1.256
3	18	"The Block Unlocked"	4 May 2012	1.029	#2		1.256
3	19	"Room Reveal"	6 May 2012	1.476	#3		1.192
4	20	"Shelley Craft's Challenge"	7 May 2012	1.440	#2		1.192
4	21	"Guest/Powder Room Renovations Continue"	8 May 2012	1.200	#5		1.192
4	22	"Scotty's Challenge Featuring Shaynna Blaze"	9 May 2012	1.119	#5		1.192
4	23	"Renovations and Paintball"	10 May 2012	1.043	#4		1.192
4	24	"The Block Unlocked"	11 May 2012	0.871	#6		1.192
4	25	"Room Reveal"	13 May 2012	1.429	#2		1.155
5	26	"Challenge"	14 May 2012	1.274	#4		1.155
5	27	"Renovations Continue"	15 May 2012	1.109	#8		1.155
5	28	"Scotty's Workshop Challenge"	16 May 2012	1.104	#4		1.155
5	29	"Scott and Shelley walk around The Block"	17 May 2012	1.105	#2		1.155
5	30	"The Block Unlocked"	18 May 2012	0.911	#5		1.155
5	31	"Room Reveal"	20 May 2012	1.678	#1		1.298
6	32	"Challenge"	21 May 2012	1.322	#4		1.298
6	33	"Renovations Continue"	22 May 2012	1.254	#4		1.298
6	34	"Scotty's Workshop Challenge"	23 May 2012	1.354	#5		1.298
6	35	"Scott and Shelley walk around The Block"	24 May 2012	1.215	#2		1.298
6	36	"The Block Unlocked"	25 May 2012	0.966	#4		1.298
6	37	"Room Reveal"	27 May 2012	1.688	#1		1.303
7	38	"Challenge"	28 May 2012	1.333	#4		1.303
7	39	"Renovations Continue"	29 May 2012	1.361	#1		1.303
7	40	"Scotty's Workshop Challenge"	30 May 2012	1.330	#1		1.303
7	41	"Scott and Shelley walk around The Block"	31 May 2012	1.239	#1		1.303
7	42	"The Block Unlocked"	1 June 2012	0.869	#1		1.303
7	43	"Room Reveal"	3 June 2012	1.806	#1		1.359
8	44	"Shelley Craft's Challenge"	4 June 2012	1.348	#3		1.359
8	45	"Renovations Continue"	5 June 2012	1.339	#2		1.359
8	46	"Scotty's Workshop Challenge"	6 June 2012	1.283	#3		1.359
8	47	"Scott and Shelley walk around The Block"	7 June 2012	1.342	#1		1.359
8	48	"The Block Unlocked"	8 June 2012	1.035	#3		1.359
8	49	"Room Reveal"	10 June 2012	1.529	#1		1.370
9	50	"Shelley Craft's Challenge"	11 June 2012	1.485	#3		1.370
9	51	"Renovations Continue"	12 June 2012	1.420	#2		1.370
9	52	"Scotty's Workshop Challenge"	13 June 2012	1.378	#4		1.370
9	53	"Scott and Shelley walk around The Block"	14 June 2012	1.319	#3		1.370
9	54	"The Block Unlocked"	15 June 2012	1.086	#2		1.370
9	55	"Room Reveal"	17 June 2012	1.889	#2		1.478
10	56	"Shelley Craft's Challenge"	18 June 2012	1.501	#3		1.478
10	57	"Renovations Continue"	19 June 2012	1.408	#1		1.478
10	58	"Scotty's Workshop Challenge"	20 June 2012	1.511	#1		1.478
10	59	"Scott and Shelley walk around The Block"	21 June 2012	1.394	#1		1.478
10	60	"The Block Unlocked"	22 June 2012	1.165	#2		1.478
10	61	"Room Reveal"	24 June 2012	1.916	#1		1.519
11	62	"Challenge Week Commences"	25 June 2012	1.543	#1		1.519
11	63	"Challenge Week Renovations Continue"	26 June 2012	1.463	#1		1.519
11	64	"Scott and Shelley walk around The Challenge House"	27 June 2012	1.465	#1		1.519
11	65	"Challenge House Room Reveal"	28 June 2012	1.586	#1		1.519
11	66	"The Block Unlocked"	29 June 2012	1.139	#1		1.519
11	67	"Grand Finale"	1 July 2012	2.145	#3		2.440
11	67	"Auctions"	1 July 2012	2.459	#2		2.440
11	67	"Winner Announced"	1 July 2012	2.715	#1		2.440
—	—	"Domestic Blitz Special"	8 July 2012	1.646	#1		1.646

- ^{a} Ratings data is from OzTAM and represents the live and same day average viewership from the 5 largest Australian metropolitan centres (Sydney, Melbourne, Brisbane, Perth and Adelaide).
