= House Rules season 3 =

House Rules
- Season 3
- No. of episodes: 39

Release
- Original network: Seven Network
- Original release: 5 May – 20 July 2015

Season chronology
- ← Previous; Season 2 Next → Season 4

The third season of Australian reality television series House Rules, also known as House Rules 2015, was confirmed in 2014 and began airing on 5 May 2015. The series was produced by the team who created the Seven reality show My Kitchen Rules and was hosted by Johanna Griggs.

This season of House Rules places six new teams renovating each other's homes and further challenges for the ultimate prize of a full mortgage payment.

== Contestant Teams ==
This season of House Rules introduced six new teams. All teams are from different states in Australia.

Team		Ages	House	Relationship	Mortgage
1	Steve & Tiana Falzon	47 & 26	Sydney, NSW	Father & Daughter	$250,000
2	Ben & Danielle Edgeworth	32 & 31	Brisbane, Qld	Newly Married	$405,000
3	Bronik Davies & Corrine Ziemer	27 & 28	Melbourne, Vic	Melbourne Lovers	$448,000
4	Ryan Rebbeck & Marlee Murphy	29 & 26	Adelaide, SA	Young Contenders	$229,000
5	Cassie Allan & Matt Smith	31	Hobart, Tas	Tassie Go-getters	$248,000
6	Karina and Brian Day	42 & 44	Geraldton, WA	Married with Kids	$360,000

== Elimination history ==
Teams' progress through the competition
Phase:	Interior Renovation (Phase 1)								Phase 2	Exteriors (Phase 3)			Phase 4	Grand Finale	
Phase:	Vic	SA	NSW	Qld	Tas	WA	24 Hour Fix-Up	Round Total (out of 170)	Holiday House	Round 1	Round 2	Round Total (out of 40)	Charity House	Secret Room	Viewer's Vote
Team	Scores							Round Total (out of 170)	Total (out of 20)	Scores		Round Total (out of 40)	Total (out of 20)	Final Results	
Steve & Tiana	19	13	—	18	21	20	13	5th (104)	3rd (18)	14	14	3rd (28)	1st (17)	19	Winners
Ben & Danielle	17	19	22	—	24	21	18 (+5)	2nd (126)	1st (20)	13	17	2nd (30)	2nd (16)	17	Runners-Up
Bronik & Corrine	—	15	21	19	23	27	12	3rd (117)	1st (20)	17	18	1st (35)	3rd (14)	Eliminated (Episode 38)	
Ryan & Marlee	16	—	19	26	21	20	13	4th (115)	4th (17)	14	13	4th (27)	Eliminated (Episode 34)		
Cassie & Matt	15	23	20	28	—	26	16	1st (128)	5th (16)	Eliminated (Episode 30)					
Karina & Brian	20	22	10	20	16	—	15	6th (103)	Eliminated (Episode 26)						

== Competition details ==
=== Phase 1: Interior Renovation ===
The six teams travel around the country to completely renovate each other's home. Every week, one team hands over their house to their opponents for a complete interior transformation. A set of rules from the owners are given to the teams known as the 'House rules' which need to be followed to gain high scores from the judges and the homeowner team.

==== Victoria: Bronik & Corrine ====
- Episodes 1 to 4
- Airdate — 5 to 10 May 2015
- Description — Bronik and Corrine from Melbourne, Victoria are the first team to hand over their keys for renovation. For the first time, unlike the normal five House Rules in previous seasons, both Bronik and Corinne each had their own set of three 'His and Hers' House Rules, which meant that teams had to work with two sets of rules that conflicted with each other.

Renovation 1
Melbourne, Victoria
His House Rules
Rule 1	Deck out our place in black steel and timber					
Rule 2	Deliver hipster hotel in the master suite					
Rule 3	Make a statement with inner-city artwork					
Her House Rules
Rule 1	Style our house in chalky pastels					
Rule 2	Throw in quirky touches and delicate delights					
Rule 3	Feature geometric elements throughout					
Team	Zone	Scores			Total (out of 30)	Running Total (Reno 1)
Team	Zone	Homeowner	Joe	Wendy	Total (out of 30)	Running Total (Reno 1)
Karina & Brian	Ensuite & Living Room	9	5	6	20	20 / 30
Steve & Tiana	Bathroom & Dining Room	6	6	7	19	19 / 30
Ben & Danielle	Kitchen, Linen, Halls & Entry	7	4	6	17	17 / 30
Ryan & Marlee	Master Bedroom & Laundry	8	3	5	16	16 / 30
Cassie & Matt	Guest Bedroom, Walk-in-Robe & Deck	6	4	5	15	15 / 30
Bronik & Corrine	—					—

==== South Australia: Ryan & Marlee ====
- Episodes 5 to 8
- Airdate — 11 to 17 May 2015
- Description — Teams head to Ryan and Marlee's home in Adelaide, South Australia for the second renovation. Teams had to allocate the five zones amongst themselves as an additional twist.
  - Previous winner's advantage: Karina and Brian — A secret house rule which they could choose keep secret or share with the others.
  - Previous loser's disadvantage: Cassie and Matt — Camping in a tent during the renovation.

Renovation 2
Adelaide, South Australia
House Rules
Rule 1	Make our house upbeat sleek					
Rule 2	Hit us with a 'Bam!' in every room					
Rule 3	Serve up happiness and sunshine in our kitchen					
Rule 4	Create a man cave with a big day out feel					
Rule 5	Give our bedrooms cheeky attitude					
Secret Rule	Give us a throne fit for a King (Karina and Brian's advantage)					
Team	Zone	Scores			Total (out of 30)	Running Total (Reno 1 & 2)
Team	Zone	Homeowner	Joe	Wendy	Total (out of 30)	Running Total (Reno 1 & 2)
Cassie & Matt	Kitchen & Dining Room	7	8	8	23	38 / 60
Karina & Brian	Master Bedroom, Ensuite & Deck	7	7	8	22	42 / 60
Ben & Danielle	Guest Bedroom & Bathroom	8	5	6	19	36 / 60
Bronik & Corrine	Living Room, Laundry, Hallway & Entry	5	5	5	15	15 / 30
Steve & Tiana	Man Cave, Porch & Deck	6	3	4	13	32 / 60
Ryan & Marlee	—					16 / 30

==== New South Wales: Steve & Tiana ====
- Episodes 9 to 12
- Airdate — 18 to 24 May 2015
- Description — Teams head to Sydney, New South Wales to completely renovate Steve and Tiana's family home. Two of the bedrooms belong to Steve's sons; 23 year old, Andrew and 5 year old, Rory.
  - Previous winner's advantage: Cassie and Matt — Allocating the zones for themselves and all other teams.
  - Previous loser's disadvantage: Bronik and Corrine — Although Steve and Tiana were the lowest scoring team in the previous week, they do not participate in the renovation of their own home, therefore the loser's tent was given to the second-lowest scorer.

Renovation 3
Sydney, New South Wales
House Rules
Rule 1	Style our house like an award-winning display home					
Rule 2	Dazzle us with leather and concrete					
Rule 3	Add shiny bling to the master bedroom					
Rule 4	Give us black, white and red all over					
Rule 5	Go over the top in the boys' bedrooms					
Team	Zone	Scores			Total (out of 30)	Running Total (Reno 1 to 3)
Team	Zone	Homeowner	Joe	Wendy	Total (out of 30)	Running Total (Reno 1 to 3)
Ben & Danielle	Living Room & Andrew's Bedroom	9	6	7	22	58 / 90
Bronik & Corrine	Dining Room & Bathroom	6	7	8	21	36 / 60
Cassie & Matt	Rory's Bedroom & Laundry	7	6	7	20	58 / 90
Ryan & Marlee	Kitchen, Entry & Hallway	7	6	6	19	35 / 60
Karina & Brian	Master Bedroom, Toilet & Linen	3	3	4	10	52 / 90
Steve & Tiana	—					32 / 60

==== Queensland: Ben & Danielle ====
- Episodes 13 to 16
- Airdate — 25 to 31 May 2015
- Description — Teams head to Brisbane, Queensland the transform Ben and Danielle's old brick home and is the first home so far to feature a second storey area. It also happened to have been filmed during the 2014 Brisbane hailstorm.
  - Previous winner's advantage: Ben and Danielle — As the winners from last week and the owners of this week's house, their advantage was to give each room a special item which teams must use within the design of the room.
  - Previous loser's disadvantage: Karina and Brian — For coming last, they are given the loser's tent, camping in the yard for the duration of the renovation.

Renovation 4
Brisbane, Queensland
House Rules
Rule 1	Style our house preppy eclectic					
Rule 2	Deliver us a mix of old and new one-off pieces					
Rule 3	Make our entry quiet, but showy					
Rule 4	Retain a hint of 'ski chalet' in the living room					
Rule 5	Give us a dressing room to die for					
Team	Zone	Scores			Total (out of 30)	Running Total (Reno 1 to 4)
Team	Zone	Homeowner	Joe	Wendy	Total (out of 30)	Running Total (Reno 1 to 4)
Cassie & Matt	Living Room & Bathroom	9	10	9	28	86 / 120
Ryan & Marlee	Dining, Ensuite & Dressing Room	8	8	10	26	61 / 90
Karina & Brian	Kitchen, Art Studio & Stairs	6	7	7	20	72 / 120
Bronik & Corrine	Entry, Laundry & Guest Bedroom	7	6	6	19	55 / 90
Steve & Tiana	Master Bedroom, Back Entrance & Butler's Pantry	6	6	6	18	50 / 90
Ben & Danielle	—					58 / 90

==== Tasmania: Cassie & Matt ====
- Episodes 17 to 20
- Airdate — 1 to 7 June 2015
- Description — The teams head to Hobart, Tasmania for a retro revival as Cassie & Matt ask their competitors to merge the old with the new. As an additional challenge, every team must also incorporate an up-cycled feature in their zones that fits with the house rules.
  - Previous winner's advantage: Cassie & Matt — As the owners of this house, they gave each team a special item that must be used within their zones.
  - Previous loser's disadvantage: Steve & Tiana — Camping in the loser's tent for the duration of the renovation.

Renovation 5
Hobart, Tasmania
House Rules
Rule 1	Give us a modern take on a sixties vibe					
Rule 2	Make the bathroom a conversation starter					
Rule 3	Deck out our guest bedroom in a nautical theme					
Rule 4	Bring a surfie feel to the study					
Rule 5	Keep it sophisticated					
Team	Zone	Scores			Total (out of 30)	Running Total (Reno 1 to 5)
Team	Zone	Homeowner	Joe	Wendy	Total (out of 30)	Running Total (Reno 1 to 5)
Ben & Danielle	Entry, Halls, Linen, Laundry & Master Bedroom	8	8	8	24	82 / 120
Bronik & Corrine	Kitchen & Study	7	8	8	23	78 / 120
Ryan & Marlee	Guest Bedroom & Deck	9	6	6	21	82 / 120
Steve & Tiana	Living Room & Ensuite	8	6	7	21	71 / 120
Karina & Brian	Dining Room & Bathroom	6	5	5	16	88 / 150
Cassie & Matt	—					86 / 120

==== Western Australia: Karina & Brian ====
- Episodes 21 to 24
- Airdate — 8 to 14 June 2015
- Description — Teams headed to Karina and Brian's home in Geraldton, Western Australia for the final interior renovation. Being in such a remote location, teams had only limited time to purchase items from Perth. Karina and Brian's children also had their bedrooms renovated, for 6-year-old Lara, 15-year-old Bailey and 16-year-old Daniel. It was anticipated that the lowest scoring team overall was to be eliminated, however in a pre-determined twist, all teams remained safe and progressed into the next round.
  - Previous winner's advantage: Ben & Danielle — They were able to decide whether to sleep in a hotel room or join the other teams in the tents.
  - Previous loser's disadvantage: All teams — All other teams slept in tents this week as part of them being in the outback to have the experience. Karina and Brian were the lowest scoring team from last week.

Renovation 6
Geraldton, Western Australia
House Rules
Rule 1	Style our house desert coastal					
Rule 2	Bring the outside in with texture and tone					
Rule 3	Give nature's treasures pride of place					
Rule 4	Add brass and copper to our kitchen					
Rule 5	Make our kids' bedrooms #totes epic					
Team	Zone	Scores			Total (out of 30)	Running Total (Reno 1 to 6)
Team	Zone	Homeowner	Joe	Wendy	Total (out of 30)	Running Total (Reno 1 to 6)
Bronik & Corrine	Main Bathroom & Daniel's Bedroom	7	10	10	27	105 / 150
Cassie & Matt	Master Bedroom, Ensuite & Halls	9	9	8	26	112 / 150
Ben & Danielle	Dining Room & Lara's Bedroom	6	7	8	21	103 / 150
Ryan & Marlee	Entry, Walk-in Pantry, Living Room & Laundry	6	7	7	20	102 / 150
Steve & Tiana	Kitchen, Linen Closet & Bailey's Bedroom	7	6	7	20	91 / 150
Karina & Brian	—					88 / 150

==== 24 Hour Fix-Up ====
- Episodes 25 to 26
- Airdate — 15 to 16 June 2015
- Description — After the first six full house interior renovations, all teams head back to their own homes and must fix and redo one of the zones in 24 hours. Teams need to recreate the space/s to reflect their own style and also to impress the judges. All teams received the same set of five rules for the challenge. Scores are added to the current totals, where the lowest scoring team overall is eliminated. The winning team also received 5 extra points to their final tally.
  - Previous winner's advantage: Bronik & Corrine — As last week's winners, they received an additional $1000 to their budget

Renovation 7
24 Hour Fix-Up
House Rules
Rule 1	Choose one zone in your house to transform				
Rule 2	Your budget is $5000				
Rule 3	Take a risk with a hero piece				
Rule 4	You must stay together at all times				
Rule 5	The winner will receive five bonus points				
Team	Zone	Scores		Total (out of 20)	Final Total (Reno 1 to 7)
Team	Zone	Joe	Wendy	Total (out of 20)	Final Total (Reno 1 to 7)
Cassie & Matt	Dining Room & Bathroom	8	8	16	1st (128)
Ben & Danielle	Master Bedroom, Back Entrance & Butlers Pantry	9	9	18 (+5)	2nd (126)
Bronik & Corrine	Bathroom & Dining Room	5	7	12	3rd (117)
Ryan & Marlee	Living Room, Laundry, Hallway & Entry	6	7	13	4th (115)
Steve & Tiana	Master Bedroom, Toilet & Linen	6	7	13	5th (104)
Karina & Brian	Entry, Walk-in Pantry, Living Room & Laundry	7	8	15	6th (103)

=== Phase 2: Holiday House ===
- Episodes 27 to 30
- Airdate — 21 to 28 June 2015
- Description — In the biggest challenge in House Rules history, the five remaining teams renovate a disconnected run-down old house into the Ultimate dream holiday home which will be won through a home viewer competition. The house was transported and permanently placed on a block of land in Hervey Bay, Queensland. Each team was allocated an interior and exterior zone to complete, which include gardens and surrounding yard areas. At the end of the challenge, the lowest scoring team is eliminated.
  - Previous winner's advantage: Cassie & Matt — For coming first in the previous interior renovation phase, they were able to choose the zone they wanted.

Renovation summary
Holiday House - Hervey Bay, Queensland
House Rules
Rule 1	Revitalise this Queenslander with charm and character			
Rule 2	Inspire with patterns and colours			
Rule 3	Build a magical children's hide-away in the back yard			
Rule 4	Add touches of luxury inside and out			
Rule 5	Deliver the ultimate dream family holiday home			
Team	Zone	Scores		Round Total (out of 20)
Team	Zone	Joe	Wendy	Round Total (out of 20)
Ben & Danielle	Guest Bedroom, Bathroom, Rear Deck & Exterior Zone 2	10	10	20
Bronik & Corrine	Living Room, Shower Room & Exterior Zone 4	10	10	20
Steve & Tiana	Master Bedroom, Laundry, Side Verandah & Exterior Zone 3	9	9	18
Ryan & Marlee	Front Deck, Entry, Dining Room & Exterior Zone 1	8	9	17
Cassie & Matt	Kitchen, Kids' Bedroom & Exterior Zone 5	8	8	16

=== Phase 3: Gardens & Exteriors ===
The top 4 teams are challenged to transform the exteriors and gardens of each other's homes. Two teams are allocated to a home (that do not belong to them) and must renovate either the front or back yards, as well as improving the house exterior. They are held over two rounds, covering all houses of the current teams. After both rounds are complete, the lowest scoring team is eliminated.

==== Round 1 ====
- Episodes 31 to 32
- Airdate — 29 to 30 June 2015
- Description — In round 1 of the exterior renovations, the 4 remaining teams head to Brisbane and Sydney to transform the gardens and house exterior in 3 and a half days. Teams are allocated to the front or back yard of either Ben & Danielle's or Steve & Tiana's house.

Renovation summary
Round 1
House Rules	Ben & Danielle's (Qld)	Steve & Tiana's (NSW)
Rule 1	Style our yard French Riviera	Give us an angular contemporary yard
Rule 2	Feature hardy plants and rocks throughout	Dazzle us with fire and water
Rule 3	Use lots of levels to create interest	Use low maintenance plants throughout
Rule 4	Make a brave statement in the front entry-way	Create an alfresco dining area to share with the family
Rule 5	Choose your zone: front or back	

Team	House	Zone	Scores		Total (out of 20)	Running Total (Round 1)
Team	House	Zone	Joe	Wendy	Total (out of 20)	Running Total (Round 1)
Bronik & Corrine	Steve & Tiana's (Sydney, NSW)	Front Yard - Deck, Driveway, Carport	8	9	17	17 / 20
Ben & Danielle	Steve & Tiana's (Sydney, NSW)	Back Yard - Lawn, Shed, Dining Area	6	7	13	13 / 20
Steve & Tiana	Ben & Danielle's (Brisbane, QLD)	Front Yard - Entry, Pathway, Courtyard	7	7	14	14 / 20
Ryan & Marlee	Ben & Danielle's (Brisbane, QLD)	Back Yard - Patio, Lounge Area	7	7	14	14 / 20

==== Round 2 ====
- Episodes 33 to 34
- Airdate — 5 to 6 July 2015
- Description — The teams continue on to round 2 of the exterior renovations in Adelaide and Melbourne to transform the gardens and house exterior in 3 and a half days. Teams are allocated to the front or back yard of either Ryan & Marlee's or Bronik & Corrine's house. At the end of this round, the lowest scoring team will be eliminated.

Renovation summary
Round 2
House Rules	Ryan & Marlee's (SA)	Bronik & Corrine's (VIC)
Rule 1	Create a backyard perfect for an Australia Day party	Give us an urban cool back yard
Rule 2	Make the front bold and structured	Make the front sweet and simple
Rule 3	Give us an orchard to relax in	Surprise us with secret garden nooks
Rule 4	Surprise us with bursts of colour	Create a feature using climbing plants
Rule 5	Choose your zone: front or back	

Team	House	Zone	Scores		Total (out of 20)	Final Total (Round 1 & 2)
Team	House	Zone	Joe	Wendy	Total (out of 20)	Final Total (Round 1 & 2)
Bronik & Corrine	Ryan & Marlee's (Adelaide, SA)	Back Yard - Deck, Pergola, Cricket Pitch, Orchard	9	9	18	1st (35)
Steve & Tiana	Ryan & Marlee's (Adelaide, SA)	Front Yard - Deck, Pathway, Driveway	7	7	14	3rd (28)
Ben & Danielle	Bronik & Corrine's (Melbourne, VIC)	Front Yard - Deck, Entry, Driveway	9	8	17	2nd (30)
Ryan & Marlee	Bronik & Corrine's (Melbourne, VIC)	Back Yard - Deck, Bar, Garden Nook	7	6	13	4th (27)

=== Phase 4: CareSouth Charity House ===
- Episodes 35 to 38
- Airdate — 7 to 14 July 2015
- Description — The 3 remaining teams renovate a charity home for CareSouth who provide a safe place for children to live in. Zones were selected by choosing one of three random cards and each cover bedrooms, bathrooms and other living spaces. After one more team is eliminated, the top 2 advance into the live Grand Final.
  - Previous winner's advantage: Bronik & Corrine — For coming first in the Exteriors round, they were the first to choose their zone from the cards.

Renovation summary
Charity House - Shoalhaven, NSW
House Rules
Rule 1	Give our home a warm and cosy feel			
Rule 2	Style our house modern rustic			
Rule 3	Choose robust easy-care furniture			
Rule 4	Deliver inspiring bedrooms that are bright and fun			
Rule 5	Create a unique look in each bathroom			
Team	Zone	Scores		Round Total (out of 20)
Team	Zone	Joe	Wendy	Round Total (out of 20)
Steve & Tiana	Kitchen, Halls, Study, Shower Room, Sitting Room & Bedroom 4	8	9	17
Ben & Danielle	Entry, Lounge, Carer's Residence & Bedroom 1	8	8	16
Bronik & Corrine	Dining Room, Office, Bathroom & Bedroom 2 & 3	7	7	14

=== Grand Final: Secret Room and Australia's Vote ===
- Episode 39
- Airdate — 20 July 2015
- Description — The final 2 teams complete one final challenge at their opponent's home, to renovate the garage into a new space and entertainment area. The Australian public vote for their favourite team to win and the winner is decided by a combination of the judges score, for the final project and overall viewer votes. The team with the best result win a complete mortgage payment and is announced live. In addition, the winning viewer of the completed Holiday House is also announced.

Renovation summary
Grand Final
House Rules	Ben & Danielle's (QLD)	Steve & Tiana's (NSW)
Rule 1	Transform our garage into an entertainers paradise	
Rule 2	Give us a Ralph Lauren atmosphere to relax in	Style the room Fonzie cool
Rule 3	Celebrate unusual pieces	Keep it sleek and smooth
Rule 4	Make the room your ultimate design statement	
Rule 5	You only have 4 days	

Team	Secret Room	Scores		Total (out of 20)	Final Result^{1} (incl. Viewer's Vote)
Team	Secret Room	Joe	Wendy	Total (out of 20)	Final Result^{1} (incl. Viewer's Vote)
Steve & Tiana	Garage - Garden Shed, Pantry & Entertainment Area	9	10	19	Winners
Ben & Danielle	Garage - Bar & Entertainment Area	8	9	17	Runners-Up

Note:

- ^1 This result is a combination of 50% from the public vote and 50% from the judge's scores for the Secret Room

== Ratings ==
Colour key:
– Highest rating during the season
– Lowest rating during the season

Wk.	Ep no.	Episode titles by stage of season			Air date	Viewers (millions)^{[a]}	Nightly rank^{[a]}	Source
1	1	Phase 1: Interior Renovation	Vic Renovation (Bronik & Corrine)	Introduction	Tuesday, 5 May	0.791	#11	
1	2	Phase 1: Interior Renovation	Vic Renovation (Bronik & Corrine)	Renovation continues	Wednesday, 6 May	0.631	#14	
1	3	Phase 1: Interior Renovation	Vic Renovation (Bronik & Corrine)	Renovation continues	Thursday, 7 May	0.655	#13	
1	4	Phase 1: Interior Renovation	Vic Renovation (Bronik & Corrine)	House Reveal	Sunday, 10 May	0.931	#4	
2	5	Phase 1: Interior Renovation	SA Renovation (Ryan & Marlee)	Introduction	Monday, 11 May	0.684	#15	
2	6	Phase 1: Interior Renovation	SA Renovation (Ryan & Marlee)	Renovation continues	Tuesday, 12 May	0.675	#14	
2	7	Phase 1: Interior Renovation	SA Renovation (Ryan & Marlee)	Renovation continues	Wednesday, 13 May	0.781	#10	
2	8	Phase 1: Interior Renovation	SA Renovation (Ryan & Marlee)	House Reveal	Sunday, 17 May	1.154	#4	
3	9	Phase 1: Interior Renovation	NSW Renovation (Steve & Tiana)	Introduction	Monday, 18 May	0.779	#13	
3	10	Phase 1: Interior Renovation	NSW Renovation (Steve & Tiana)	Renovation continues	Tuesday, 12 May	0.759	#11	
3	11	Phase 1: Interior Renovation	NSW Renovation (Steve & Tiana)	Renovation continues	Wednesday, 20 May	0.763	#9	
3	12	Phase 1: Interior Renovation	NSW Renovation (Steve & Tiana)	House Reveal	Sunday, 24 May	1.068	#5	
4	13	Phase 1: Interior Renovation	Qld Renovation (Ben & Danielle)	Introduction	Monday, 25 May	0.820	#10	
4	14	Phase 1: Interior Renovation	Qld Renovation (Ben & Danielle)	Renovation continues	Tuesday, 26 May	0.756	#9	
4	15	Phase 1: Interior Renovation	Qld Renovation (Ben & Danielle)	Renovation continues	Wednesday, 27 May^{[b]}	0.410	—	
4	15	Phase 1: Interior Renovation	Qld Renovation (Ben & Danielle)	Renovation continues	Thursday, 28 May^{[c]}	0.379	—	
4	16	Phase 1: Interior Renovation	Qld Renovation (Ben & Danielle)	House Reveal	Sunday, 31 May	1.131	#3	
5	17	Phase 1: Interior Renovation	Tas Renovation (Cassie & Matt)	Introduction	Monday, 1 June	0.782	#10	
5	18	Phase 1: Interior Renovation	Tas Renovation (Cassie & Matt)	Renovation continues	Tuesday, 2 June	0.828	#9	
5	19	Phase 1: Interior Renovation	Tas Renovation (Cassie & Matt)	Renovation continues	Wednesday, 3 June	0.856	#8	
5	20	Phase 1: Interior Renovation	Tas Renovation (Cassie & Matt)	House Reveal	Sunday, 7 June	0.973	#3	
6	21	Phase 1: Interior Renovation	WA Renovation (Karina & Brian)	Introduction	Monday, 8 June	0.884	#10	
6	22	Phase 1: Interior Renovation	WA Renovation (Karina & Brian)	Renovation continues	Tuesday, 9 June	0.881	#8	
6	23	Phase 1: Interior Renovation	WA Renovation (Karina & Brian)	Renovation continues	Wednesday, 10 June	0.924	#8	
6	24	Phase 1: Interior Renovation	WA Renovation (Karina & Brian)	House Reveal	Sunday, 14 June	1.086	#3	
7	25	Phase 1: Interior Renovation	24 Hour Fix-Up	Introduction	Monday, 15 June	0.907	#8	
7	26	Phase 1: Interior Renovation	24 Hour Fix-Up	Reveal & Elimination	Tuesday, 16 June	1.004	#5	
8	27	Phase 2: Holiday House		Introduction	Sunday, 21 June	0.971	#4	
8	28	Phase 2: Holiday House		Renovation Continues	Monday, 22 June	0.860	#11	
8	29	Phase 2: Holiday House		Renovation Continues	Tuesday, 23 June	0.903	#9	
8	30	Phase 2: Holiday House		Reveal & Elimination	Sunday, 28 June	1.019	#5	
9	31	Phase 3: Gardens & Exteriors	Round 1	Introduction	Monday, 29 June	0.868	#10	
9	32	Phase 3: Gardens & Exteriors	Round 1	Reveal	Tuesday, 30 June	0.942	#8	
9	33	Phase 3: Gardens & Exteriors	Round 2	Introduction	Sunday, 5 July	0.992	#6	
9	34	Phase 3: Gardens & Exteriors	Round 2	Reveal & Elimination	Monday, 6 July	0.972	#9	
10	35	Phase 4: CareSouth Charity House		Introduction	Tuesday, 7 July	0.779	#9	
10	36	Phase 4: CareSouth Charity House		Renovation Continues	Sunday, 12 July	0.905	#6	
10	37	Phase 4: CareSouth Charity House		Renovation Continues	Monday, 13 July	0.866	#10	
10	38	Phase 4: CareSouth Charity House		Reveal & Elimination	Tuesday, 14 July	1.002	#8	
11	39	Grand Final		Live episode	Monday, 20 July	1.097	#6	
11	39	Grand Final		Winner announced	Monday, 20 July	1.295	#3	
Season average - 0.894

^{a} Ratings data used is from OzTAM and represents the live and same day average viewership from the 5 largest Australian metropolitan centres (Sydney, Melbourne, Brisbane, Perth and Adelaide).

== Notes ==
- ^{b} Melbourne, Adelaide & Perth only
- ^{c} Sydney & Brisbane only
