= House Rules season 4 =

House Rules
- Season 4
- Promotional title card for Crowded House Rules
- No. of episodes: 35

Release
- Original network: Seven Network
- Original release: 27 April – 3 July 2016

Season chronology
- ← Previous; Season 3 Next → Season 5

The fourth season of Australian reality television series House Rules, also known as Crowded House Rules, began airing on 27 April 2016. The series is produced by the team who created the Seven reality show My Kitchen Rules and is hosted by Johanna Griggs.

Season 4 of the program was officially announced in 2014 and was originally due to air in late 2015, however the Seven Network delayed the season until 2016 due to an overload of renovation shows that had aired in 2015 as well as lower than expected ratings for the third season.

This season of House Rules will consist of new teams renovating each other's homes and further challenges for the ultimate prize of their mortgage being paid off.

== Contestant Teams ==
This season of House Rules introduced six new teams. All teams are from different states in Australia

Team		Ages	House	Relationship	Mortgage
1	Luke & Cody Cook	23	Dalby, QLD	Country Twin Brothers	$120,000
2	Claire Lintzeris & Hagan Rice	28 & 27	Mornington Peninsula, VIC	Hairdresser & Plumber	$269,000
3	Fil & Joe	45 & 48	Melbourne, VIC	Experienced Renovators	$568,000
4	Brooke & Michelle Fogden	43 & 42	Adelaide, SA	Landscaper & Graphic Designer	$426,000
5	Nancy & Daniel Frilay		Sydney, NSW	Reno Rookies	$500,000
6	Rose & Rob Plater	29 & 41	Rockingham, WA	Navy Parents	$342,000

== Elimination history ==
Teams' progress through the competition
Phase:	Interior Renovation (Phase 1)							Phase 2	Exteriors (Phase 3)			Phase 4	Grand Finale	
Phase:	VIC	SA	NSW	QLD	WA	VIC	Round Total (out of 150)	24 Hour Fix-Up	Round 1	Round 2	Round Total (out of 40)	Charity Unit Makeover	Secret Room	Viewers' Vote
Team	Scores						Round Total (out of 150)	Total (out of 20)	Scores		Round Total (out of 40)	Total (out of 20)	Final Results	
Luke & Cody	26	23	17	N/A	22	30	1st (118)	2nd (16)	17	16	1st (33)	1st (17)	17	Winners
Claire & Hagan	16	21	20	30	18	N/A	5th (105)	3rd (15)	15	13	3rd (28)	2nd (15)	19	Runners-up
Fil & Joe	N/A	16	22	22	28	28	2nd (116)	4th (13)	16	14	2nd (30)	3rd (13)	Eliminated (Episode 34)	
Brooke & Michelle	21	N/A	16	25	25	23	3rd (110)	1st (17)	13	13	4th (26)	Eliminated (Episode 30)		
Nancy & Daniel	18	19	N/A	23	23	24	4th (107)	5th (12)	Eliminated (Episode 26)					
Rose & Rob	22	15	23	24	N/A	19	6th (103)	Eliminated (Episode 24)						

== Competition details ==
=== Phase 1: Interior Renovation ===
The six teams travel around the country to completely renovate each other's home. Every week, one team hands over their house to their opponents for a complete interior transformation. A set of rules from the owners are given to the teams known as the 'House rules' which need to be followed to gain high scores from the judges and the homeowner team.

==== Victoria: Fil & Joe ====
- **Episodes 1 to 4**
- **Airdate** — 27 April to 1 May 2016
- **Description** — Fil & Joe from Melbourne, Victoria are the first team to hand over their keys for renovation. Two of the bedrooms belong to their children Jayden, 18 years old and Celeste, 14 years old.

Renovation 1
Melbourne, Victoria
House Rules
Rule 1	Give us Hamptons - "Revenge" style					
Rule 2	Be bold: go black & white in the kitchen					
Rule 3	Glam up our master suite with Hollywood Deco					
Rule 4	Create a laidback teenage hideaway					
Rule 5	Go OTT with a five star wet room					
Team	Zone	Scores			Total (out of 30)	Running Total (Reno 1)
Team	Zone	Homeowner	Joe	Wendy	Total (out of 30)	Running Total (Reno 1)
Luke & Cody	Jayden’s Room, Deck, Back Stairs & Ensuite	9	9	8	**26**	**26 / 30**
Rose & Rob	Master Bedroom, WIR, Entry & Main Deck	8	7	7	**22**	**22 / 30**
Brooke & Michelle	Celeste’s Room, Linen Cupboard & Kitchen	7	7	7	**21**	**21 / 30**
Nancy & Daniel	Teenagers' Retreat, Dining Room & Laundry	6	6	6	**18**	**18 / 30**
Claire & Hagan	Living Room, Hallway & Family Bathroom	5	5	6	**16**	**16 / 30**
Fil & Joe	—					—

==== South Australia: Brooke & Michelle ====
- **Episodes 5 to 8**
- **Airdate** — 2 to 8 May 2016
- **Description** — Teams head to Brooke & Michelle's home in Adelaide, South Australia for the second renovation. One of the bedrooms will be shared for their children Addison, eight years old and Tildie, five years old.
  - Previous winner's advantage: Luke & Cody — They got to decide on which zone they wanted to renovate
  - Previous loser's disadvantage: Claire & Hagan — Camping in a tent during the renovation.

Renovation 2
Adelaide, South Australia
House Rules
Rule 1	Play up the elegant charm of our period home					
Rule 2	Add a funky, modern living area					
Rule 3	Give Michelle a tough luxe workspace with guest bed					
Rule 4	Surprise with a playful piece in every zone					
Rule 5	Make our bathroom a turquoise delight					
Team	Zone	Scores			Total (out of 30)	Running Total (Reno 1 & 2)
Team	Zone	Homeowner	Joe	Wendy	Total (out of 30)	Running Total (Reno 1 & 2)
Luke & Cody	Kitchen, Entry & WIR	9	7	7	**23**	49 / 60
Claire & Hagan	Girls' Bedroom, Dining Room & Pantry	8	6	7	**21**	37 / 60
Nancy & Daniel	Girls' Bathroom & Michelle’s Workspace	7	6	6	**19**	37 / 60
Fil & Joe	Master Bedroom & Main Bathroom	6	5	5	**16**	16 / 30
Rose & Rob	Living Room, Laundry & Hall	5	5	5	**15**	37 / 60
Brooke & Michelle	—					21 / 30

==== New South Wales: Nancy & Daniel ====
- **Episodes 9 to 12**
- **Airdate** — 9 to 15 May 2016
- **Description** — Teams head to South Sydney, New South Wales to completely renovate Nancy & Daniel's family home. Two of the bedrooms belong to their children; six year old, Jonathan and three year old, Sophia.
  - Previous winner's advantage: Luke & Cody — Decide to keep the zone they were allocated or swap zones with another team. They decided to keep their zone
  - Previous loser's disadvantage: Rose & Rob — Camping in a tent during the renovation.

Renovation 3
South Sydney, New South Wales
House Rules
Rule 1	Create an A-Lister's entertainer					
Rule 2	Style it coastal chic					
Rule 3	Wash the living room with a wave of colour					
Rule 4	Float some timber into the bathrooms					
Rule 5	Give our master suite a shot of pizzazz					
Team	Zone	Scores			Total (out of 30)	Running Total (Reno 1 to 3)
Team	Zone	Homeowner	Joe	Wendy	Total (out of 30)	Running Total (Reno 1 to 3)
Rose & Rob	Kitchen, Sophia's Bedroom & Linen Cupboard	9	7	7	**26**	61 / 90
Fil & Joe	Living Room, Entry & WIR	7	7	8	**22**	38/ 60
Claire & Hagan	Laundry, Master Bedroom & Back Deck	8	6	6	**20**	57 / 90
Luke & Cody	Ensuite, Study, Hall & Dining Room	6	5	6	**17**	66 / 90
Brooke & Michelle	Bathroom, Jonathan's Bedroom & Side Deck	5	5	6	**16**	37 / 60
Nancy & Daniel	—					37 / 60

==== Queensland: Luke & Cody ====
- **Episodes 13 to 16**
- **Airdate** — 16 to 22 May 2016
- **Description** — Teams head to Dalby, Queensland to renovate Luke & Cody's 1940s home. As their home is more than 200 km away from Brisbane, the teams only have limited time to purchase their items.
  - Previous winner's advantage: Rose & Rob — Allocating the zones for themselves and all other teams.
  - Previous loser's disadvantage: Brooke & Michelle — Camping in a tent during the renovation.

Renovation 4
Dalby, Queensland
House Rules
Rule 1	Add city shine to our country gem					
Rule 2	Give luke a classic gentleman's master suite					
Rule 3	Channel George Clooney in Cody's room					
Rule 4	Bloke it up with blue and put stone in every zone					
Rule 5	Throw in a porch to yarn on					
Team	Zone	Scores			Total (out of 30)	Running Total (Reno 1 to 4)
Team	Zone	Homeowner	Joe	Wendy	Total (out of 30)	Running Total (Reno 1 to 4)
All Teams^{1}	Back Deck^{1}					
Claire & Hagan	Kitchen, Dining Room & Guest Bedroom	10	10	10	**30**	87 / 120
Brooke & Michelle	Laundry & Luke's Master Bedroom	8	9	8	**25**	62 / 90
Rose & Rob	Bathroom & Porch	7	8	9	**24**	84 / 120
Nancy & Daniel	Ensuite & Cody's Room	9	7	7	**23**	60 / 90
Fil & Joe	Living Room, WIR, Hallway & Entry	6	7	9	**22**	60 / 90
Luke & Cody	—					66 / 90

Notes

- **^1** As Luke & Cody's birthday landed on the day of their House Reveal, Carolyn asked all the teams to work together to build a new back deck for the boys as a special birthday gift, this was however a non scored zone

==== Western Australia: Rose & Rob ====
- **Episodes 17 to 20**
- **Airdate** — 23 to 29 May 2016
- **Description** — Teams head to Rockingham, Western Australia to completely transform Rose & Rob's home. Two of the bedrooms belong to their three children; seven year old, David, six year old, Sam & three year old, Teddy
  - Previous winner's advantage: Claire & Hagan — They got to decide on which zone they wanted to renovate & five different fabrics with one to be given to each team to incorporate in their room
  - Previous loser's disadvantage: Fil & Joe — Camping in a tent during the renovation.

Renovation 5
Rockingham, Western Australia
House Rules
Rule 1	Style our home retro revival					
Rule 2	Splash around parika, teal & mustard					
Rule 3	Show off our art in the living room					
Rule 4	Go 'Shagadelic' in the bathroom					
Rule 5	No white walls or wallpaper					
Team	Zone	Scores			Total (out of 30)	Running Total (Reno 1 to 5)
Team	Zone	Homeowner	Joe	Wendy	Total (out of 30)	Running Total (Reno 1 to 5)
Fil & Joe	Laundry and Sam & David's Room	9	9	10	**28**	88 / 120
Brooke & Michelle	Dining Room & Ensuite	7	9	9	**25**	87 / 120
Nancy & Daniel	Kitchen & Master Bedroom	8	8	7	**23**	83 / 120
Luke & Cody	Living Room & Teddy's Bedroom	6	8	8	**22**	88 / 120
Claire & Hagan	Bathroom, WIR, Entry & Hallway	5	7	6	**18**	105 / 150
Rose & Rob	—					84 / 120

==== Victoria: Claire & Hagan ====
- **Episodes 21 to 24**
- **Airdate** — 30 May to 5 June 2016
- **Description** — Teams head to Peninsula, Victoria to renovate Claire & Hagan's home for the final interior renovation. In a House Rules first the teams added another level to Claire & Hagan's small house.
  - Previous winner's advantage: Fil & Joe — Cash bonus of $5000.
  - Previous loser's disadvantage: Luke & Cody — Although Claire and Hagan were the lowest scoring team in the previous week, they do not participate in the renovation of their own home, therefore the loser's tent was given to the second-lowest scorer.

Renovation 6
Peninsula, Victoria
House Rules
Rule 1	Stamp it 'warehouse raw'					
Rule 2	Choose an industrial palette					
Rule 3	Break it up with bold graphics & bites of colour					
Rule 4	Upcycle materials from the Peninsula					
Rule 5	Squeeze in a play space					
Team	Zone	Scores			Total (out of 30)	Running Total (Reno 1 to 6)
Team	Zone	Homeowner	Joe	Wendy	Total (out of 30)	Running Total (Reno 1 to 6)
Luke & Cody	Master Bedroom & Dining Room	10	10	10	**30**	1st (118)
Fil & Joe	Kitchen & Matilda's Bedroom	9	9	10	**28**	2nd (116)
Brooke & Michelle	Laundry & Darcy's Bedroom	8	8	7	**23**	3rd (110)
Nancy & Daniel	Living Room & Bathroom	7	9	8	**24**	4th (107)
Claire & Hagan	—					5th (105)
Rose & Rob	Family Room, Ensuite, Stairs & Hallway	6	7	6	**19**	6th (103)

=== Phase 2 ===
==== 24 Hour Fix-Up ====
- **Episode 25 & 26**
- **Airdate** — 6 & 7 June 2016
- **Description** — All teams head back to their own homes and must fix and redo one of the zones in 24 hours. Teams need to recreate the space/s to reflect their own style and also to impress the judges. All teams received the same set of five rules for the challenge. The lowest scoring team will be eliminated.

Renovation summary
24 Hour Fix-Up
House Rules
Rule 1	Choose one zone			
Rule 2	Rework it in your style			
Rule 3	Get creative with DIY			
Rule 4	Your budget is $5000			
Rule 5	Stay together at all times			
Team	Zone	Scores		Round Total (out of 20)
Team	Zone	Joe	Wendy	Round Total (out of 20)
Brooke & Michelle	Living Room, Laundry & Hall	8	9	**17**
Luke & Cody	Ensuite & Cody's Room	8	8	**16**
Claire & Hagan	Family Room, Ensuite, Stairs & Hallway	7	8	**15**
Fil & Joe	Living Room, Hallway & Family Bathroom	6	7	**13**
Nancy & Daniel	Ensuite, Study, Hall & Dining Room	6	6	**12**

=== Phase 3: Gardens & Exteriors ===
The top 4 teams are challenged to transform the exteriors and gardens of each other's homes. Two teams are allocated to a home (that do not belong to them) and must renovate either the front or back yards, as well as improving the house exterior. They are held over two rounds, covering all houses of the current teams. After both rounds are complete, the lowest scoring team is eliminated.

==== Round 1 ====
- **Episodes 27 & 28**
- **Airdate** — 12 & 13 June
- **Description** — In round 1 of the exterior renovations, the 4 remaining teams head to Adelaide and Mornington Peninsula to transform the gardens and house exterior in 4 Days. Teams are allocated to the front or back yard of either Brooke & Michelle's or Claire & Hagan's house.

Renovation summary
Round 1
House Rules	Brooke & Michelle's (SA)	Claire & Hagan's (VIC)
Rule 1	Make our front garden timeless and elegant	Style our garden coastal cool
Rule 2	Give us 'Tuscany on the train line' out back	Strike a balance between sleek and organic
Rule 3	Add a living pantry for Brooke the cook	Feature a fireplace and pop-up kitchen
Rule 4	Build a clever cubby house for our kids	Inspire our kids with a creative play space
Rule 5	Choose your zone: front or back	Choose your zone: left or right

Team	House	Zone	Scores		Total (out of 20)	Running Total (Round 1)
Team	House	Zone	Joe	Wendy	Total (out of 20)	Running Total (Round 1)
Luke & Cody	Brooke & Michelle's (Adelaide, SA)	Frontyard - Fence, Path, Driveway, Cubby & Lounge	8	9	**17**	**17 / 20**
Claire & Hagan	Brooke & Michelle's (Adelaide, SA)	Backyard - Paved Area, Garden Bed & Dining	7	8	**15**	**15 / 20**
Fil & Joe	Claire & Hagan's (Mornington; Peninsula, VIC)	Left side^{2} - Lounge Area, Fireplace, Shower & Cubby	8	8	**16**	**16 / 20**
Brooke & Michelle	Claire & Hagan's (Mornington; Peninsula, VIC)	Right side^{2} - Dining/Kitchen, Play Area & Driveway	6	7	**13**	**13 / 20**

Notes

- **^2** As Claire & Hagan's house doesn't have a front yard, the back yard was split into 2, a right side and a left side

==== Round 2 ====
- **Episodes 29 & 30**
- **Airdate** — 14 & 19 June
- **Description** — In round 2 of the exterior renovations, the 4 remaining teams head to Dalby and Melbourne to transform the gardens and house exterior in 4 Days. Teams are allocated to the front or back yard of either Luke & Cody's or Fil & Joe's house. The lowest scoring team overall is eliminated.

Renovation summary
Round 2
House Rules	Luke & Cody's (QLD)	Fil & Joe's (VIC)
Rule 1	Plant a no-fuss modern country garden	Give our Hamptons house a Hamptons garden
Rule 2	Tie it together with timber	Create a classy water feature out front
Rule 3	Make our back deck feel like a flash pub	Warm our hearts with a family fire pit
Rule 4	Bung in a beer garden	Add a deck for our kids to chill
Rule 5	Choose your zone: Front or Back	

Team	House	Zone	Scores		Total (out of 20)	Final Total (Round 1 & 2)
Team	House	Zone	Joe	Wendy	Total (out of 20)	Final Total (Round 1 & 2)
Fil & Joe	Luke & Cody's (Dalby, QLD)	Backyard - Garden, Lawn Pool Table & Bar	7	7	**14**	**2nd (30)**
Claire & Hagan	Luke & Cody's (Dalby, QLD)	Frontyard - Fence, Stairs, Driveway & Beer Garden	7	6	**13**	**3rd (28)**
Luke & Cody	Fil & Joe's (Melbourne, VIC)	Frontyard - Fence, Gazebo, Driveway & Water Feature	8	8	**16**	**1st (33)**
Brooke & Michelle	Fil & Joe's (Melbourne, VIC)	Backyard - Deck, Lounge, Dining & Paved area	6	7	**13**	**4th (26)**

=== Phase 4 ===
==== Charity Unit Makeover ====
- **Episodes 31 to 34**
- **Airdate** — 20 to 27 June
- **Description** — The 3 remaining teams have 7 days to renovate 3 units in an apartment building operated by The Leukaemia Foundation where patients from the country stay during treatment. Each team is given a zone with rooms from all 3 units & a garden area. Each unit has a design brief, Scandi Chic (Unit 1), Balinese Resort (Unit 2) & Manhattan Apartment (Unit 3). The lowest scoring team will be eliminated & the top 2 will advance into the live Grand Final.

Renovation summary
Charity Unit Makeover
House Rules
Rule 1	Create a home away from home			
Rule 2	Choose a warm and cheerful palette			
Rule 3	Style it relaxed and comfy			
Rule 4	Use luscious leather and touchable textures			
Rule 5	Install clever storage and a desk nook			
Team	Zone	Scores		Round Total (out of 20)
Team	Zone	Joe	Wendy	Round Total (out of 20)
Luke & Cody	Living Room^{3}, Bedrooms^{4}, Kitchen & Bathroom^{5} & Tranquil Garden	8	9	**17**
Claire & Hagan	Bedrooms^{3}, Kitchen & Bathroom^{4}, Living Room^{5} & Kids' Play Area	7	8	**15**
Fil & Joe	Kitchen & Bathroom^{3}, Living Room^{4}, Bedrooms^{5} & Social Space	6	7	**13**

Notes

- **^3** The room(s) was in Unit 1
- **^4** The room(s) was in Unit 2
- **^5** The room(s) was in Unit 3

=== Grand Final ===
==== Spa Area and Australia's Vote ====
- **Episode 35**
- **Airdate** — 3 July 2016
- **Description** — The final 2 teams complete one final challenge at their opponent's home, to create an entertainment spa area. The Australian public vote for their favourite team to win and the winner is decided by a combination of the judges score, for the final project and overall viewer votes. The team with the best result win a complete mortgage payment and is announced live. The secret zones were revealed to be outside entertaining areas that had to incorporate a spa with a pergola to top it off.

Renovation summary
Grand Final
House Rules	Luke & Cody's (QLD)	Claire & Hagan's (VIC)
Rule 1	Create the look of an outback billabong	Create the look of a coastal cabana
Rule 2	Incorporate a spa and pergola	
Rule 3	Use stone to beef up the bush setting	Get inspired by our local beach boxes
Rule 4	Feature native plants and grasses	Use coastal plants and weathered timbers
Rule 5	You have four days	

Team	Spa Area	Scores		Total (out of 20)	Final Result^{6} (incl. Viewer's Vote)
Team	Spa Area	Joe	Wendy	Total (out of 20)	Final Result^{6} (incl. Viewer's Vote)
Luke & Cody	VIC - Coastal Entertainment Spa Area	8	9	**17**	**Winners**
Claire & Hagan	QLD - Outback Entertainment Spa Area	9	10	**19**	**Runners-up**

Notes

- **^6** This result is a combination of 50% from the public vote and 50% from the judge's scores for the Secret Room

== Ratings ==
Colour key:
– Highest rating during the season
– Lowest rating during the season

Wk.	Ep no.	Episode titles by stage of season			Air date	Viewers (millions)^{[a]}	Nightly rank^{[a]}	Source
1	1	Phase 1: Interior Renovation	VIC Renovation (Fil & Joe)	Introduction	Wednesday, 27 April	0.718	#10	
1	2	Phase 1: Interior Renovation	VIC Renovation (Fil & Joe)	Renovation Continues	Thursday, 28 April	0.686	#10	
1	3	Phase 1: Interior Renovation	VIC Renovation (Fil & Joe)	Renovation Continues	Thursday, 28 April	0.542	#16	
1	4	Phase 1: Interior Renovation	VIC Renovation (Fil & Joe)	House Reveal	Sunday, 1 May	0.830	#10	
2	5	Phase 1: Interior Renovation	SA Renovation (Brooke & Michelle)	Introduction	Monday, 2 May	0.666	#16	
2	6	Phase 1: Interior Renovation	SA Renovation (Brooke & Michelle)	Renovation Continues	Tuesday, 3 May	0.702	#13	
2	7	Phase 1: Interior Renovation	SA Renovation (Brooke & Michelle)	Renovation Continues	Wednesday, 4 May	0.813	#8	
2	8	Phase 1: Interior Renovation	SA Renovation (Brooke & Michelle)	House Reveal	Sunday, 8 May	0.864	#6	
3	9	Phase 1: Interior Renovation	NSW Renovation (Nancy & Daniel)	Introduction	Monday, 9 May	0.765	#10	
3	10	Phase 1: Interior Renovation	NSW Renovation (Nancy & Daniel)	Renovation Continues	Tuesday, 10 May	0.729	#11	
3	11	Phase 1: Interior Renovation	NSW Renovation (Nancy & Daniel)	Renovation Continues	Wednesday, 11 May	0.786	#8	
3	12	Phase 1: Interior Renovation	NSW Renovation (Nancy & Daniel)	House Reveal	Sunday, 15 May	0.920	#4	
4	13	Phase 1: Interior Renovation	QLD Renovation (Luke & Cody)	Introduction	Monday, 16 May	0.730	#10	
4	14	Phase 1: Interior Renovation	QLD Renovation (Luke & Cody)	Renovation Continues	Tuesday, 17 May	0.825	#9	
4	15	Phase 1: Interior Renovation	QLD Renovation (Luke & Cody)	Renovation Continues	Wednesday, 18 May	0.787	#8	
4	16	Phase 1: Interior Renovation	QLD Renovation (Luke & Cody)	House Reveal	Sunday, 22 May	1.030	#4	
5	17	Phase 1: Interior Renovation	WA Renovation (Rose & Rob)	Introduction	Monday, 23 May	0.801	#8	
5	18	Phase 1: Interior Renovation	WA Renovation (Rose & Rob)	Renovation Continues	Tuesday, 24 May	0.746	#11	
5	19	Phase 1: Interior Renovation	WA Renovation (Rose & Rob)	Renovation Continues	Wednesday, 25 May	0.834	#8	
5	20	Phase 1: Interior Renovation	WA Renovation (Rose & Rob)	House Reveal	Sunday, 29 May	1.240	#3	
6	21	Phase 1: Interior Renovation	VIC Renovation (Claire & Hagan)	Introduction	Monday, 30 May	0.915	#8	
6	22	Phase 1: Interior Renovation	VIC Renovation (Claire & Hagan)	Renovation Continues	Tuesday, 31 May	0.865	#8	
6	23	Phase 1: Interior Renovation	VIC Renovation (Claire & Hagan)	Renovation Continues	Wednesday, 1 June^{[b]}	0.480	—	
6	23	Phase 1: Interior Renovation	VIC Renovation (Claire & Hagan)	Renovation Continues	Thursday, 2 June^{[c]}	0.428	—	
6	24	Phase 1: Interior Renovation	VIC Renovation (Claire & Hagan)	House Reveal & Elimination	Sunday, 5 June	1.207	#4	
7	25	Phase 2: 24 Hour Fix-Up		Introduction	Monday, 6 June	0.872	#9	
7	26	Phase 2: 24 Hour Fix-Up		Reveal & Elimination	Tuesday, 7 June	1.016	#6	
8	27	Phase 3: Gardens & Exteriors	Round 1	Introduction	Sunday, 12 June	0.956	#3	
8	28	Phase 3: Gardens & Exteriors	Round 1	Reveal	Monday, 13 June	0.990	#5	
8	29	Phase 3: Gardens & Exteriors	Round 2	Introduction	Tuesday, 14 June	0.917	#6	
8	30	Phase 3: Gardens & Exteriors	Round 2	Reveal & Elimination	Sunday, 19 June	1.084	#3	
9	31	Phase 4: Charity Unit Makeover		Introduction	Monday, 20 June	0.963	#6	
9	32	Phase 4: Charity Unit Makeover		Renovation Continues	Tuesday, 21 June	0.911	#7	
9	33	Phase 4: Charity Unit Makeover		Renovation Continues	Sunday, 26 June	1.019	#3	
9	34	Phase 4: Charity Unit Makeover		Reveal & Elimination	Monday, 27 June	1.051	#6	
10	35	Grand Final		Live episode	Sunday, 3 July	1.144	#4	
10	35	Grand Final		Winner announced	Sunday, 3 July	1.193	#3	
Season Average - 0.888

^{a} Ratings data used is from OzTAM and represents the live and same day average viewership from the 5 largest Australian metropolitan centres (Sydney, Melbourne, Brisbane, Perth and Adelaide).

== Notes ==
- ^{b} Melbourne, Adelaide & Perth only
- ^{c} Sydney & Brisbane only
