= House Rules season 2 =

House Rules
- Season 2
- No. of episodes: 37

Release
- Original network: Seven Network
- Original release: 30 April – 6 July 2014

Season chronology
- ← Previous; Season 1 Next → Season 3

The second season of Australian reality television series House Rules, also known as House Rules 2014, was confirmed in 2013 and began airing on 30 April 2014. The series is produced by the team who created the Seven reality show My Kitchen Rules and is hosted by Johanna Griggs.

This season of House Rules places six new teams renovating each other's homes and further challenges for the ultimate prize of a full mortgage payment.

== Contestant Teams ==
This season of House Rules introduced six new teams. All teams are from different states in Australia.

#	Team	House	Relationship	Mortgage
1	Adam Dovile & Lisa Lamond	Melbourne, VIC	Engaged	$520,000
2	Carole & Russell Bramston	Perth, WA	Empty Nesters	$290,000
3	Candy Stuart & Ryan Pusic	Sydney, NSW	Partners	$400,000
4	Maddi Carter & Lloyd Wright	Townsville, QLD	Soon to be married	$369,000
5	Michael Bamford & Mel Chatfield	Adelaide, SA	Newly Dating	$380,000
6	Brooke Strong & Grant Lovekin	Huon Valley, TAS	Partners, 7 kids	$258,000

== Elimination history ==
Teams' progress through the competition
Phase:	Interior Renovation (Phase 1)							Phase 2 and 3			Exteriors (Phase 4)			Phase 5	Grand Finale	
Phase:	NSW	WA	VIC	TAS	QLD	SA	Round Total (out of 150)	Unit Makeover	24 hour fix-up	Round Total (out of 40)	Round 1	Round 2	Total (out of 40)	Charity House	Secret Room	Viewer's vote
Team	Scores						Round Total (out of 150)	Scores		Round Total (out of 40)	Scores		Total (out of 40)	Total (out of 20)	Final Results	
Adam & Lisa	12	20	—	19	30	24	2nd (105)	15	12	3rd (27)	17	13	1st (30)	1st (18)	17	Winners
Carole & Russell	23	—	16	23	23	22	1st (107)	14	14	2nd (28)	14	14	3rd (28)	2nd (17)	19	Runners-up
Candy & Ryan	—	17	19	22	25	20	3rd (103)	19	15	1st (34)	13	16	2nd (29)	3rd (16)	Eliminated (Episode 36)	
Maddi & Lloyd	15	24	22	21	—	19	4th (101)	12	15	3rd (27)	11	12	4th (23)	Eliminated (Episode 32)		
Bomber & Mel	17	19	23	20	18	—	5th (97)	8	10	5th (18)	Eliminated (Episode 28)					
Brooke & Grant	18	15	16	—	19	23	6th (91)	Eliminated (Episode 24)								

== Competition Details ==
=== Phase 1: Interior Renovation ===
The interior renovation round followed similar rules to season 1. New advantages such as being able to allocate zones for the other teams or receiving additional hints from the owners through an online chat or video, were awarded to the top scorers of the week. Also for the first time, judges scored and critiqued in front of the teams rather than receiving a recap of the comments from the host (Jo). The team with the lowest combined score is eliminated as the other teams progress to the next stage of the competition.

==== New South Wales: Candy & Ryan ====
- Episodes 1 to 4
- Airdate — 30 April to 5 May 2014
- Description — Candy & Ryan from Emu Plains, New South Wales are the first team to hand over their keys for renovation.

Renovation 1
Emu Plains, New South Wales
House Rules
Rule 1	Style our home edgy & arty					
Rule 2	Deliver one-off pieces and graphic patterns					
Rule 3	Showcase the bath in the master suite					
Rule 4	Dish up citrus & concrete in our kitchen					
Rule 5	Give Candy crazy colour in a fun laundry					
Team	Zone	Scores			Total (out of 30)	Running Total (Reno 1)
Team	Zone	Homeowner	Joe	Wendy	Total (out of 30)	Running Total (Reno 1)
Carole & Russell	Kitchen & Dining	9	7	7	23	23 / 30
Brooke & Grant	Master Bedroom, Ensuite & WIR	6	6	6	18	18 / 30
Bomber & Mel	Bathroom & Guest Bedroom	7	5	5	17	17 / 30
Maddi & Lloyd	Living Room, Pantry & Laundry	6	4	5	15	15 / 30
Adam & Lisa	Study, Entry, Linen & Family Room	5	3	4	12	12 / 30
Candy & Ryan	—					—

==== Western Australia: Carole & Russell ====
- Episodes 5 to 8
- Airdate — 6 to 12 May 2014
- Description — Carole & Russell from Perth Hills, Western Australia are the second team to hand over their keys for renovation.
  - Previous winner's advantage: Carole & Russell — As it was there renovation, they got to choose one luxury item to add to the house, they chose a spa.
  - Previous loser's disadvantage: Adam & Lisa — Camping in the back yard in a tent during the renovation.

Renovation 2
Perth Hills, Western Australia
House Rules
Rule 1	Style us industrial chic					
Rule 2	Create a butler's pantry with a barn door					
Rule 3	Give us a stunning al fresco dining room					
Rule 4	Vintage luxe our bedrooms					
Rule 5	Shower our bathrooms in champagne and chocolate					
Team	Zone	Scores			Total (out of 30)	Running Total (Reno 1 & 2)
Team	Zone	Homeowner	Joe	Wendy	Total (out of 30)	Running Total (Reno 1 & 2)
Maddi & Lloyd	Ensuite & WIR	8	8	8	24	39 / 60
Adam & Lisa	Guest Bedroom & Bathroom	6	7	7	20	32 / 60
Bomber & Mel	Living Room, Linen Closet & Front Deck	6	6	7	19	36 / 60
Candy & Ryan	Master Bedroom & Deck, Laundry & Hallway	5	6	6	17	17 / 30
Brooke & Grant	Kitchen & Pantry	7	4	4	15	33 / 60
Carole & Russell	—					23 / 30

==== Victoria: Adam & Lisa ====
- Episodes 9 to 12
- Airdate — 13 to 19 May 2014
- Description — Adam & Lisa from Melbourne, Victoria are the third team to hand over their keys for renovation.
  - Previous winner's advantage: Maddi & Lloyd — Allocating the zones for themselves and all other teams.
  - Previous loser's disadvantage: Brooke & Grant — Camping in the back yard in a tent during the renovation.

Renovation 3
Melbourne, Victoria
House Rules
Rule 1	Create a modern showstopper					
Rule 2	Deliver a wow statement in every room					
Rule 3	Give us earthy tones and pops of patterns					
Rule 4	Glam it up with mirrors and wallpaper					
Rule 5	Make our bedroom a moody boudoir					
Team	Zone	Scores			Total (out of 30)	Running Total (Reno 1 to 3)
Team	Zone	Homeowner	Joe	Wendy	Total (out of 30)	Running Total (Reno 1 to 3)
Bomber & Mel	Entry and Kitchen	8	7	8	23	59 / 90
Maddi & Lloyd	Master Bedroom, Ensuite & WIR	7	7	8	22	61 / 90
Candy & Ryan	Living Room & Study	6	6	7	19	36 / 60
Brooke & Grant	Guest Bedroom & Laundry	5	5	6	16	49 / 90
Carole & Russell	Dining Room, Bathroom & Deck	6	5	5	16	39 / 60
Adam & Lisa	—					32 / 60

==== Tasmania: Brooke & Grant ====
- Episodes 13 to 16
- Airdate — 20 to 26 May 2014
- Description — Brooke & Grant from Huon Valley, Tasmania are the fourth team to hand over their keys for renovation. Their house is the first in House Rules history to receive an extension. Four bedrooms belong to their children Hayden, Logan, Oliver, Patrick, Harrison, Riley & Mihayla.
  - Previous winner's advantage: Bomber & Mel — They got to decide on which zone they wanted to renovate and an online call to the homeowners regarding the styling direction of the renovation
  - Previous loser's disadvantage: Carole & Russell — Although Brooke & Grant and Carole & Russell both came equal last, Brooke & Grant do not participate in the renovation of their own home, therefore the loser's tent was given to the equal-lowest scorer.

Renovation 4
Huon Valley, Tasmania
House Rules
Rule 1	Style us 'country farmhouse' with rustic charm					
Rule 2	Delight our kids with fantasy bedrooms					
Rule 3	Come up with creative storage solutions x 7					
Rule 4	Calm us all down with olive and miss tones					
Rule 5	Indulge us with a claw foot slipper bath					
Team	Zone^{1}	Scores			Total (out of 30)	Running Total (Reno 1 to 4)
Team	Zone^{1}	Homeowner	Joe	Wendy	Total (out of 30)	Running Total (Reno 1 to 4)
Carole & Russell	Living Room, Toilet & Master bedroom	7	8	8	23	62 / 90
Candy & Ryan	Kitchen, Hayden & Logan’s Bedroom & WIR	5	8	9	22	58 / 90
Maddi & Lloyd	Entry, Mihayla’s bedroom, Dining & Shower	5	8	8	21	82 / 120
Bomber & Mel	Harrison & Riley’s Bedroom & Bathroom	7	7	6	20	79 / 120
Adam & Lisa	Oliver & Patrick’s bedroom & Laundry	6	6	7	19	51 / 90
Brooke & Grant	—					49 / 90

- ^1 - For the Tasmania home renovation, there were a few minor changes made to the usual competition format. Unlike other renovated homes, a majority of the existing internal layout remained the same, meaning teams did not need to mark out their zone spaces. This house was also given an extension to accommodate a family of 9. Zones and room spaces for the extension were also pre-decided.
- During this renovation, some teams were allocated a kids' bedroom in their zone, and were given additional hints to what the kids want in their rooms, on top of the main five house rules.

==== Queensland: Maddi & Lloyd ====
- Episodes 17 to 20
- Airdate — 27 May to 1 June 2014
- Description — Maddi & Lloyd from Townsville, Queensland are the fifth team to hand over their keys for renovation.
  - Previous winner's advantage: Carole & Russell — Allocating the zones for themselves and all other teams.
  - Previous loser's disadvantage: Adam & Lisa — Camping in the back yard in a tent during the renovation.

Renovation 5
Townsville, Queensland
House Rules
Rule 1	Give us laid-back coastal paradise					
Rule 2	Add a splash of the Bahamas					
Rule 3	Furnish our kitchen with a dream island					
Rule 4	Layer in texture instead of colour					
Rule 5	Keep it organic					
Team	Zone	Scores			Total (out of 30)	Running Total (Reno 1 to 5)
Team	Zone	Homeowner	Joe	Wendy	Total (out of 30)	Running Total (Reno 1 to 5)
Adam & Lisa	Kitchen & Guest Bedroom	10	10	10	30^{2}	81 / 120
Candy & Ryan	Bathroom, Hall & Study	8	8	9	25	83 / 120
Carole & Russell	Living Room & Ensuite	8	7	8	23	85 / 120
Brooke & Grant	Master Bedroom. WIR, Linen & Deck 1	6	6	7	19	68 / 120
Bomber & Mel	Entry, Dining Room, Laundry & Deck 2	6	6	6	18	97 / 150
Maddi & Lloyd	—					82 / 120

- ^2 - Adam and Lisa were awarded the first ever perfect score in the interior rounds for this renovation.

==== South Australia: Bomber & Mel ====
- Episodes 21 to 24
- Airdate — 3 to 9 June 2014
- Description — Bomber & Mel from Adelaide, South Australia are the sixth and final team to hand over their keys for the interior renovation phase. Four bedrooms belong to their children Abby, Kaitlin, Ethan & Jordan. The lowest scoring team overall will be eliminated.
  - Previous winner's advantage: Adam & Lisa — A secret brief from the homeowners relevant to their zone
  - Previous loser's disadvantage: Brooke & Grant — Although Bomber & Mel were the lowest scoring team in the previous week, they do not participate in the renovation of their own home and because it was their own home they got to choose who got the tent and they chose Brooke and Grant.

Renovation 6
Adelaide, South Australia
House Rules
Rule 1	Style us 'junk-shop chic'					
Rule 2	Give our family room a warehouse feel					
Rule 3	Create kids' bedrooms that inspire creativity					
Rule 4	Bring a 'Whisky & cigar vibe' to our lounge					
Rule 5	up-cycle everything in our shed					
Team	Zone	Scores			Total (out of 30)	Final Total (Reno 1 to 6)
Team	Zone	Homeowner	Joe	Wendy	Total (out of 30)	Final Total (Reno 1 to 6)
Carole & Russell	Abby’s Bedroom, Hallway, Bathroom & Linen	7	7	8	22	1st (107)
Adam & Lisa	Entry, Master Bedroom, WIR & Ensuite	7	8	9	24	2nd (105)
Candy & Ryan	Ethan’s Bedroom, Laundry & Lounge	6	7	7	20	3rd (103)
Maddi & Lloyd	Kitchen, Dining Room & Kaitlin’s Bedroom	6	6	7	19	4th (101)
Bomber & Mel	—					5th (97)
Brooke & Grant	Jordan’s Bedroom, Family Room & Toilet	8	7	8	23	6th (91)

- During this renovation, some teams were allocated a kids' bedroom in their zone, and were given additional hints to what the kids want in their rooms, on top of the main five house rules. Abby was a clear favourite to bomber and mel. Bomber and mel have now split up and Mel and her daughter Abby live together in the house and Bomber and Jordan live together in a rental house, while Ethan and Kaitlin are living with their mum.

=== Phase 2 and 3 ===
Teams competed in two challenges. To make it a level playing field, all scores from the previous round were wiped clean. After both challenges were complete, scores are combined and the lowest scoring team is eliminated.

==== Phase 2: Unit makeover ====
- Episodes 25 & 26
- Airdate — 10 & 11 June 2014
- Description — Teams were each required to renovate a unit apartment in four days. The homeowners of the units each filmed a video brief for the teams to follow, outlining the styles and theme they wish to have in their homes. Teams must stay together during this challenge, meaning team's partners could not leave without the other. At the end, the highest scoring team will gain an advantage at the next challenge.

Renovation summary
Unit Makeover
House Rules
Rule 1	Clear out the clutter				
Rule 2	Amaze us with smart solutions for small spaces				
Rule 3	Go for high impact design				
Rule 4	Follow our video briefs				
Rule 5	You have four days				
Team	Unit Owner's brief	Scores		Total (out of 20)	Running Total (Phase 2)
Team	Unit Owner's brief	Joe	Wendy	Total (out of 20)	Running Total (Phase 2)
Candy & Ryan	Monica's "Edgy & Eclectic"	9	10	19	19 / 20
Adam & Lisa	Eleanor & Michael's "Modern Plantation"	7	8	15	15 / 20
Carole & Russell	Jack & Alice's "Tropical Resort"	7	7	14	14 / 20
Maddi & Lloyd	Maria's "Modern, Rustic Italian"	6	6	12	12 / 20
Bomber & Mel	Sulman & Sila's "Nepalese Heritage"	4	4	8	8 / 20

==== Phase 3: 24 Hour Fix-Up ====
- Episodes 27 & 28
- Airdate — 15 & 16 June 2014
- Description — For this challenge, teams headed back to their renovated homes and must fix or re-do one of the zones in 24 hours. With a $5000 budget, teams need to recreate the space/s to reflect their own style and also to impress the judges.
  - Previous winner's advantage: Candy & Ryan — Received an additional $1000 to their budget.

Renovation summary
24 Hour Fix-Up
House Rules
Rule 1	Choose just one zone to work on				
Rule 2	Impress with a unique vision				
Rule 3	Make is reflect your style				
Rule 4	Your budget is $5000				
Rule 5	You have 24 hours				
Team	Zone	Scores		Total (out of 20)	Final Total (Phase 2 & 3)
Team	Zone	Joe	Wendy	Total (out of 20)	Final Total (Phase 2 & 3)
Candy & Ryan	Study, Entry, Linen & Family Room	7	8	15	1st (34)
Carole & Russell	Master Bedroom, Deck, Laundry & Hallway	7	7	14	2nd (28)
Adam & Lisa	Guest Bedroom & Laundry	6	6	12	3rd (27)
Maddi & Lloyd	Master Bedroom, WIR, Linen & Deck 1	8	7	15	3rd (27)
Bomber & Mel	Kitchen, Dining Room & Kaitlin's Bedroom	5	5	10	5th (18)

=== Phase 4: Gardens and Exteriors ===
The top 4 teams are challenged to transform the exteriors and gardens of each other's homes. Two teams are allocated to a home (that do not belong to them) and must renovate either the front or back yards, as well as improving the house exterior. For each house, the owners also left an exclusive item that must be used in the zone. The semifinals are held over two rounds and after both rounds are complete, the lowest scoring team is eliminated.

==== Round 1 ====
- Episodes 29 & 30
- Airdate — 17 to 22 June 2014
- Description — In round 1 of the exterior renovations, the 4 remaining teams head to West Sydney and Perth Hills to transform the gardens and house exterior in 3 1/2 days. Teams are allocated to the front or back yard of either Candy & Ryan's or Carole & Russell's house.

Renovation summary
Round 1
House Rules	Candy & Ryan's (NSW)	Carole & Russell's (WA)
Rule 1	Make our garden sleek & modern	Create a Bali-inspired bush haven
Rule 2	Animate our entry with lights & water	Make it safe for our grandkids
Rule 3	Give us shades of green, no flowers!	Carve out tranquil relaxing spaces
Rule 4	Mix in timber, stone & metal accents	Light up our nights with a tropical vibe
Rule 5	Choose your zone: front or back	

Team	House	Zone	Scores		Total (out of 20)	Running Total (Round 1)
Team	House	Zone	Joe	Wendy	Total (out of 20)	Running Total (Round 1)
Adam & Lisa	Carole & Russell's (Perth, WA)	Front Yard	8	9	17	17 / 20
Candy & Ryan	Carole & Russell's (Perth, WA)	Back Yard	6	7	13	13 / 20
Carole & Russell	Candy & Ryan's (Sydney, NSW)	Back Yard	6	8	14	14 / 20
Maddi & Lloyd	Candy & Ryan's (Sydney, NSW)	Front Yard	5	6	11	11 / 20

==== Round 2 ====
- Episodes 31 & 32
- Airdate — 23 to 24 June 2014
- Description — The teams continue on to round 2 of the exterior renovations in Townsville and Melbourne to transform the gardens and house exterior in 3 1/2 days. Teams are allocated to the front or back yard of either Maddi & Lloyd's or Adam & Lisa's house. At the end of this round, the lowest scoring team will be eliminated.

Renovation summary
Round 2
House Rules	Maddi & Lloyd's (QLD)	Adam & Lisa's (VIC)
Rule 1	Make our garden 'Palm Springs cool'	Create a cottage garden with loads of charms
Rule 2	Deliver a statement entrance	Add character with brick and fretwork
Rule 3	Create a poolside paradise fit for a wedding	Delight us with a modern fresco backyard
Rule 4	Give our dogs a lush open backyard	Screen out the neighbours
Rule 5	Choose your zone: front or back	

Team	House	Zone	Scores		Total (out of 20)	Final Total (Round 1 & 2)
Team	House	Zone	Joe	Wendy	Total (out of 20)	Final Total (Round 1 & 2)
Adam & Lisa	Maddi & Lloyd's (Townsville, QLD)	Back Yard	6	7	13	1st (30)
Carole & Russell	Maddi & Lloyd's (Townsville, QLD)	Front Yard	7	7	14	3rd (28)
Candy & Ryan	Adam & Lisa's (Melbourne, VIC)	Front Yard	8	8	16	2nd (29)
Maddi & Lloyd	Adam & Lisa's (Melbourne, VIC)	Back Yard	6	6	12	4th (23)

=== Phase 5: Barnardos Charity House ===
- Episodes 33 to 36
- Airdate — 25 June to 2 July 2014
- Description — The top 3 teams give this old charity house a new interior makeover. The house belongs to the Barnardos Australia charity and is used as a holiday home for foster families. Rules for this challenge are very similar to the first interior renovations, where each team must renovate an allocated zone. This was selected through a random card draw. The winning two teams advance to the Grand Final, as one more is eliminated.

Renovation summary
Charity House - Shellharbour, NSW
House Rules
Rule 1	Delight us with a fun, family beach house			
Rule 2	Make it safe and friendly for kids			
Rule 3	Go for a relaxed, retro feel			
Rule 4	Keep it bright with 'pops' of colour			
Rule 5	Find creative, easy-care options			
Team	Zone	Scores		Round Total (out of 20)
Team	Zone	Joe	Wendy	Round Total (out of 20)
Adam & Lisa	Dining, Main Kids’ Bedroom, Laundry, Linen, Hall, Toilet & Deck	9	9	18
Carole & Russell	Living Room, Bathroom, Parents’ Bedroom & Ramp	8	9	17
Candy & Ryan	Entry, Kitchen, Games Area, Bedroom, Porch & Stairs	8	8	16

=== Grand Final: Final Renovation and Australia's Vote ===
- Episode 37
- Airdate — 6 July 2014
- Description — The final two teams completed one final challenge at their opponent's home, renovating a spare/secret room into a themed bar and spa area. The Australian public also voted for their favourite team to win. The winner was decided by a combination of the judges score, for the final project and overall viewer votes.

Renovation summary
Grand Final
House Rules	Adam & Lisa's (VIC)	Carole & Russell's (WA)
Rule 1	Transform our old shed into a bar	Transform our downstairs room into a bar
Rule 2	Add a spa where we can party	
Rule 3	Give it James Bond style	Give us six star Bali luxury
Rule 4	Make the room your ultimate design statement	
Rule 5	You only have 4 days	

Team	Secret Room	Scores		Total (out of 20)	Final Result^{1} (incl. Viewer's Vote)
Team	Secret Room	Joe	Wendy	Total (out of 20)	Final Result^{1} (incl. Viewer's Vote)
Adam & Lisa	WA Downstairs Room - Bar & Spa Entertainment Area	8	9	17	Winners
Carole & Russell	VIC Shed - Indoor/Outdoor Bar & Spa	9	10	19	Runners-Up

Note:

- ^1 - Final result combines both the judge's scores and the results from Australia's vote.

== Ratings ==
Colour key:
– Highest rating during the season
– Lowest rating during the season

Wk.	Ep no.	Episode titles by stage of season			Air date	Viewers (millions)^{[a]}	Nightly rank^{[a]}	Source
1	1	Phase 1: Interior Renovation	NSW Renovation (Candy & Ryan)	Introduction	Wednesday, 30 April	1.183	#2	
1	2	Phase 1: Interior Renovation	NSW Renovation (Candy & Ryan)	Renovation continues	Thursday, 1 May	0.987	#8	
1	3	Phase 1: Interior Renovation	NSW Renovation (Candy & Ryan)	Renovation continues	Sunday, 4 May	1.093	#6	
1	4	Phase 1: Interior Renovation	NSW Renovation (Candy & Ryan)	House reveal	Monday, 5 May	1.085	#8	
2	5	Phase 1: Interior Renovation	WA Renovation (Carole & Russell)	Introduction	Tuesday, 6 May	0.951	#8	
2	6	Phase 1: Interior Renovation	WA Renovation (Carole & Russell)	Renovation continues	Wednesday, 7 May	0.964	#8	
2	7	Phase 1: Interior Renovation	WA Renovation (Carole & Russell)	Renovation continues	Sunday, 11 May	1.058	#5	
2	8	Phase 1: Interior Renovation	WA Renovation (Carole & Russell)	House reveal	Monday, 12 May	1.292	#2	
3	9	Phase 1: Interior Renovation	VIC Renovation (Adam & Lisa)	Introduction	Tuesday, 13 May	1.029	#6	
3	10	Phase 1: Interior Renovation	VIC Renovation (Adam & Lisa)	Renovation continues	Wednesday, 14 May	1.072	#5	
3	11	Phase 1: Interior Renovation	VIC Renovation (Adam & Lisa)	Renovation continues	Sunday, 18 May	1.276	#5	
3	12	Phase 1: Interior Renovation	VIC Renovation (Adam & Lisa)	House reveal	Monday, 19 May	1.487	#2	
4	13	Phase 1: Interior Renovation	TAS Renovation (Brooke & Grant)	Introduction	Tuesday, 20 May	1.146	#6	
4	14	Phase 1: Interior Renovation	TAS Renovation (Brooke & Grant)	Renovation continues	Wednesday, 21 May	1.272	#2	
4	15	Phase 1: Interior Renovation	TAS Renovation (Brooke & Grant)	Renovation continues	Sunday, 25 May	1.264	#4	
4	16	Phase 1: Interior Renovation	TAS Renovation (Brooke & Grant)	House reveal	Monday, 26 May	1.658	#1	
5	17	Phase 1: Interior Renovation	QLD Renovation (Maddi & Lloyd)	Introduction	Tuesday, 27 May	1.312	#1	
5	18	Phase 1: Interior Renovation	QLD Renovation (Maddi & Lloyd)	Renovation continues	Wednesday, 28 May^{[b]}	0.640	#16	
5	18	Phase 1: Interior Renovation	QLD Renovation (Maddi & Lloyd)	Renovation continues	Thursday, 29 May^{[c]}	0.498	#20	
5	19	Phase 1: Interior Renovation	QLD Renovation (Maddi & Lloyd)	Renovation continues	Sunday, 1 June	1.301	#4	
5	20	Phase 1: Interior Renovation	QLD Renovation (Maddi & Lloyd)	House reveal	Monday, 2 June	1.652	#1	
6	21	Phase 1: Interior Renovation	SA Renovation (Bomber & Mel)	Introduction	Tuesday, 3 June	1.446	#1	
6	22	Phase 1: Interior Renovation	SA Renovation (Bomber & Mel)	Renovation continues	Wednesday, 4 June	1.377	#1	
6	23	Phase 1: Interior Renovation	SA Renovation (Bomber & Mel)	Renovation continues	Sunday, 8 June	1.170	#3	
6	24	Phase 1: Interior Renovation	SA Renovation (Bomber & Mel)	House reveal & Elimination	Monday, 9 June	1.793	#1	
7	25	Phase 2: Unit makeover		Introduction	Tuesday, 10 June	1.402	#1	
7	26	Phase 2: Unit makeover		Reveal	Wednesday, 11 June	1.527	#1	
8	27	Phase 3: 24 Hour Fix-Up		Introduction	Sunday, 15 June	1.407	#4	
8	28	Phase 3: 24 Hour Fix-Up		Reveal & Elimination	Monday, 16 June	1.572	#1	
9	29	Phase 4: Gardens & Exteriors	Round 1	Introduction	Tuesday, 17 June	1.484	#1	
9	30	Phase 4: Gardens & Exteriors	Round 1	Reveal	Sunday, 22 June	1.515	#2	
9	31	Phase 4: Gardens & Exteriors	Round 2	Introduction	Monday, 23 June	1.473	#1	
9	32	Phase 4: Gardens & Exteriors	Round 2	Reveal & Elimination	Tuesday, 24 June	1.630	#1	
10	33	Phase 5: Barnardos Charity House		Introduction	Wednesday, 25 June	1.375	#1	
10	34	Phase 5: Barnardos Charity House		Renovation continues	Monday, 30 June	1.491	#1	
10	35	Phase 5: Barnardos Charity House		Renovation continues	Tuesday, 1 July	1.514	#1	
10	36	Phase 5: Barnardos Charity House		Reveal & Elimination	Wednesday, 2 July	1.518	#1	
11	37	Grand Final		Live episode	Sunday, 6 July	1.730	#2	
11	37	Grand Final		Winner announced	Sunday, 6 July	1.988	#1	
Season Average - 1.248

^{a} Ratings data used is from OzTAM and represents the live and same day average viewership from the 5 largest Australian metropolitan centres (Sydney, Melbourne, Brisbane, Perth and Adelaide).

== Notes ==
- ^{b} Melbourne, Adelaide & Perth only
- ^{c} Sydney & Brisbane only
