= House Rules season 1 =

House Rules
- Season 1
- No. of episodes: 28

Release
- Original network: Seven Network
- Original release: 14 May – 1 July 2013

Season chronology
- Next → Season 2

The first season of Australian reality television series House Rules, also known as House Rules 2013, was commissioned in 2012 and began airing on 14 May 2013. The series is produced by the team who created the Seven reality show My Kitchen Rules and is hosted by Johanna Griggs.

House Rules places six teams renovating each other's homes and further challenges for the ultimate prize of a full mortgage payment.

== Contestant Teams ==
This season of House Rules introduced six new teams. All teams are from different states in Australia.

#	Team	Ages	House	Relationship	Mortgage
1	Carly Schulz & Leighton Brow	31 & 32	Adelaide, SA	Couple Two Years	$460,000
2	Michelle & Steve Ball	48	Sydney, NSW	Married 27 Years	$629,000
3	Jemma & Ben Van Ryt	26 & 27	Perth, WA	Just Married	$545,000
4	Nick & Chris Stavropoulos	22 & 27	Melbourne, VIC	Brothers	$524,000
5	Amy Garrett & Sean Cornish	30 & 26	Brisbane, QLD	Engaged	$300,000
6	Jane Polley & Plinio Taurian		Hobart, TAS	Married with children	$315,000

== Elimination history ==
Teams' progress through the competition
Phase:	Interior Renovation (Phase 1)							Phase 2	Exteriors (Phase 3)			Grand Finale
Phase:	WA	TAS	VIC	SA	QLD	NSW	Round Total (out of 150)	24 Hour Fix Up	Round 1	Round 2	Round Total (out of 40)	Viewers Choice
Team	Scores						Round Total (out of 150)	Total (out of 20)	Scores		Round Total (out of 40)	Result
Carly & Leighton	25	19	14	—	21	28	1st (107)	1st (18)	13	18	1st (31)	Winner
Michelle & Steve	17	19	16	17	28	—	4th (97)	Tie 2nd (15)	15	15	2nd (30)	Runner-Up
Nick & Chris	20	20	—	17	15	18	5th (90)	3rd (12)	11	15	3rd (26)	Eliminated (Episode 27)
Jemma & Ben	—	15	28	23	24	16	2nd (106)	Tie 2nd (15)	14	11	4th (25)	Eliminated (Episode 27)
Amy & Sean	10	21	25	20	—	22	3rd (98)	4th (11)	Eliminated (Episode 25)			
Jane & Plinio	19	—	20	16	19	15	6th (89)	Eliminated (Episode 24)				

== Competition Details ==
=== Phase 1: Interior Renovation ===
For the interior renovation round, all 6 teams had their homes transformed by each other through a rotation round format over a course of 6 weeks. At the end of each renovation, the highest scoring team received an advantage for the next renovation, and lowest scoring receiving a disadvantage. At the end, all scores were tallied up and the team with lowest overall total was eliminated from the competition.

==== Western Australia: Jemma & Ben ====
- Episodes 1 to 4
- Airdate — 14 to 20 May 2013
- Description — Teams head to the first renovation at Jemma & Ben's 1950s home in Perth, Western Australia.

Renovation 1
Perth, Western Australia
House Rules
Rule 1	Make it feel 'now' with an edge					
Rule 2	Create a kitchen/dining area we can party in					
Rule 3	Style a beauty room fit for a princess					
Rule 4	No bright annoying colours					
Rule 5	Give us leather and chandeliers					
Team	Zone	Scores			Total (out of 30)	Running Total (Reno 1)
Team	Zone	Homeowner	Joe	Wendy	Total (out of 30)	Running Total (Reno 1)
Carly & Leighton	Master Bedroom & Ensuite	8	8	9	25	25 / 30
Nick & Chris	Kitchen & Dining Room	7	6	7	20	20 / 30
Jane & Plinio	Bathroom & Laundry	6	7	6	19	19 / 30
Michelle & Steve	Lounge & Spare Bedroom	5	6	6	17	17 / 30
Amy & Sean	Hallway & Beauty Room	3	3	4	10	10 / 30
Jemma & Ben	—					—

==== Tasmania: Jane & Plinio ====
- Episodes 5 to 8
- Airdate — 21 to 27 May 2013
- Description — Teams head off to the second renovation at Jane & Plinio's 1930s home in Hobart, Tasmania. Two bedrooms belong to their children Jarra, 16 years old & Nina, eight years old.
  - Previous winner's advantage: Carly & Leighton — They got to decide on which zone they wanted to renovate
  - Previous loser's disadvantage: Amy & Sean — Camping in the back yard in a tent during the renovation.

Renovation 2
Hobart, Tasmania
House Rules
Rule 1	Make us an entry to remember					
Rule 2	Show off our books in a study nook					
Rule 3	Give us a family-friendly kitchen					
Rule 4	Deliver Danish design with an art deco twist					
Rule 5	Keep it eco friendly					
Team	Zone	Scores			Total (out of 30)	Running Total (Reno 1 & 2)
Team	Zone	Homeowner	Joe	Wendy	Total (out of 30)	Running Total (Reno 1 & 2)
Amy & Sean	Nina's Bedroom & Bathroom	8	7	6	21	31 / 60
Nick & Chris	Lounge, Dining & Entry	5	7	8	20	40 / 60
Carly & Leighton	Kitchen & Family Room	7	6	6	19	44 / 60
Michelle & Steve	Master Bedroom, Study & Hallway	5	7	7	19	36 / 60
Jemma & Ben	Jarra's Bedroom, Toilet & Laundry	6	4	5	15	15 / 30
Jane & Plinio	—					19 / 30

==== Victoria: Nick & Chris ====
- Episodes 9 to 12
- Airdate — 28 May to 3 June 2013
- Description — Teams travel to Nick & Chris's 1970s home in Melbourne, Victoria for the third renovation.
  - Previous winner's advantage: Amy & Sean — They got to decide on which zone they wanted to renovate
  - Previous loser's disadvantage: Jemma & Ben — Camping in the back yard in a tent during the renovation.

Renovation 3
Melbourne, Victoria
House Rules
Rule 1	Give us MAD MEN cool					
Rule 2	Colour our palette moody and murky					
Rule 3	Put a retro divider between the entrance and the lounge					
Rule 4	Style our kitchen bold and dramatic					
Rule 5	Take some risks					
Team	Zone	Scores			Total (out of 30)	Running Total (Reno 1 to 3)
Team	Zone	Homeowner	Joe	Wendy	Total (out of 30)	Running Total (Reno 1 to 3)
Jemma & Ben	Lounge & Entrance Hall	8	10	10	28	43 / 60
Amy & Sean	Kitchen, Family & Meals	6	9	10	25	56 / 90
Jane & Plinio	Chris' Bedroom & Ensuite	7	7	6	20	39 / 60
Michelle & Steve	Bathroom & Laundry	4	7	5	16	52 / 90
Carly & Leighton	Nick's Bedroom, Centre Hall & Den	5	4	5	14	58 / 90
Nick & Chris	—					40 / 60

==== South Australia: Carly & Leighton ====
- Episodes 13 to 16
- Airdate — 4 to 10 June 2013
- Description — Teams head to Carly & Leighton's 1950s home in Adelaide, South Australia for the fourth renovation.
  - Previous winner's advantage: Jemma & Ben — They got to decide on which zone they wanted to renovate
  - Previous loser's disadvantage: Michelle & Steve — Although Carly & Leighton were the lowest scoring team in the previous week, they do not participate in the renovation of their own home and because Jemma and Ben got the highest score they got to choose who went into the tent and they chose Michelle and Steve.

Renovation 4
Adelaide, South Australia
House Rules
Rule 1	Use stone and wood but don't give us rustic					
Rule 2	Make a "splash" in the entry					
Rule 3	Draw a palette from nature					
Rule 4	Give us a versatile island we can dine at					
Rule 5	Fit out the family room with a sandstone fireplace					
Team	Zone	Scores			Total (out of 30)	Running Total (Reno 1 to 4)
Team	Zone	Homeowner	Joe	Wendy	Total (out of 30)	Running Total (Reno 1 to 4)
Jemma & Ben	Kitchen, Meals, Halls & Linen	7	8	8	23	66 / 90
Amy & Sean	Ensuite & Walk-in-robe	5	7	8	20	76 / 120
Nick & Chris	Bathroom & Family Room	7	5	5	17	57 / 90
Michelle & Steve	Guest Room & Entry	6	5	6	17	69 / 120
Jane & Plinio	Master Bedroom, Laundry & Study	4	6	6	16	55 / 90
Carly & Leighton	—					58 / 90

==== Queensland: Amy & Sean ====
- Episodes 17 to 20
- Airdate — 11 to 17 June 2013
- Description — Teams travel to Brisbane, Queensland to renovate Amy & Sean's 1950s home for the fifth renovation.
  - Previous winner's advantage: Jemma & Ben — They got to decide on which zone they wanted to renovate
  - Previous loser's disadvantage: Jane & Plinio — Camping in the back yard in a tent during the renovation.

Renovation 5
Brisbane, Queensland
House Rules
Rule 1	Give our Queenslander heritage charm					
Rule 2	Style us "modern country" with clean lines					
Rule 3	Create an industrial-style kitchen with rustic warmth					
Rule 4	Incorporate wall panelling and fretwork arches					
Rule 5	Make it warm, welcoming and positive					
Team	Zone	Scores			Total (out of 30)	Running Total (Reno 1 to 5)
Team	Zone	Homeowner	Joe	Wendy	Total (out of 30)	Running Total (Reno 1 to 5)
Michelle & Steve	Kitchen, Meals & Deck	8	10	10	28	97 / 150
Jemma & Ben	Master Bedroom & Ensuite	6	9	9	24	90 / 120
Carly & Leighton	Study, Bathroom & Hall	5	8	8	21	79 / 120
Jane & Plinio	Living, Laundry & Exercise Area	7	6	6	19	74 / 120
Nick & Chris	Entry, Spare Bedroom & Porch	6	4	5	15	72 / 120
Amy & Sean	—					76 / 120

==== New South Wales: Michelle & Steve ====
- Episodes 21 to 24
- Airdate — 18 to 24 June 2013
- Description — Teams travel to Sydney, New South Wales to renovate Michelle & Steve's 1950s family home in the sixth and final interior renovation. Two bedrooms belong to their children; daughter Alex, 20 years old & son Jesse, 18 years old. The lowest scoring team overall will be eliminated.
  - Previous winner's advantage: None - Michelle & Steve came first in the last renovation, but due to this renovation being their home they are not involved in the renovation, therefore there is no winner advantage.
  - Previous loser's disadvantage: Nick & Chris — Camping in the back yard in a tent during the renovation.

Renovation 6
Sydney, New South Wales
House Rules
Rule 1	Create a relaxed family beach house					
Rule 2	Make it bright and airy with lime-washed floors					
Rule 3	Add a touch of Morocco in artwork and tiles					
Rule 4	Bring Waikiki in our kitchen					
Rule 5	Give us a deep spa bath to relax in					
Team	Zone	Scores			Total (out of 30)	Final Total (Reno 1 to 6)
Team	Zone	Homeowner	Joe	Wendy	Total (out of 30)	Final Total (Reno 1 to 6)
Carly & Leighton	Lounge Room & Deck	10	9	9	28	1st (107)
Jemma & Ben	Master Bedroom, Hall, Entry & Stairs	3	7	6	16	2nd (106)
Amy & Sean	Jesse's Bedroom, Porch & Toilet	7	7	8	22	3rd (98)
Michelle & Steve	—					4th (97)
Nick & Chris	Alex's Bedroom & Bathroom	4	7	7	18	5th (90)
Jane & Plinio	Kitchen & Dining Room	5	5	5	15	6th (89)

=== Phase 2: 24 Hour Fix-Up ===
- Episode 25
- Airdate — 25 June 2013
- Description — Each team returned to their own home and had to re-invent one of the zones in 24 hours. Teams must stick to a budget of $5000 and must stay together at all times. The lowest scoring team will be eliminated.

Renovation summary
24 Hour Fix-Up
House Rules
Rule 1	You have 24 hours			
Rule 2	You have a budget of $5000			
Rule 3	You may work on one zone only			
Rule 4	Make the zone reflect your style			
Rule 5	You must stay together at all times			
Team	Zone	Scores		Round Total (out of 20)
Team	Zone	Joe	Wendy	Round Total (out of 20)
Carly & Leighton	Master Bedroom, Laundry & Study	9	9	18
Michelle & Steve	Kitchen & Dining Room	8	7	15
Jemma & Ben	Hallway & Beauty Room	7	8	15
Nick & Chris	Nick's Bedroom, Centre Hall & Den	6	6	12
Amy & Sean	Entry, Spare Bedroom & Porch	6	5	11

=== Phase 3: Gardens and Exteriors ===
The top 4 teams are challenged to transform the exteriors and gardens of each other's homes. Two teams are allocated to a home (that does not belong to them) and must renovate either the front or back yards, as well as improving the house exterior. For each house, the owners also left an exclusive item that must be used in the zone. The semifinals are held over two rounds and after both rounds are complete, the two lowest scoring team are eliminated.

==== Round 1 ====
- Episode 26
- Airdate — 26 & 27 June 2013
- Description — In round 1 of the exterior renovations, the 4 remaining teams head to Sydney and Adelaide to transform the gardens and house exterior in 3 and a half days. Teams are allocated to the front or back yard of either Michelle & Steve's or Carly & Leighton's house.

Renovation summary
Round 1
House Rules	Michelle & Steve's (NSW)	Carly & Leighton's (SA)
Rule 1	Give us a resort-style entrance	Give us a year-round outdoor entertainment area
Rule 2	Build a BBQ deck in the backyard	Create a secluded haven in our backyard
Rule 3	Make a memorial at Grandpa's chair	Modernise our front yard and extend the carport
Rule 4	Light up our nights with a fire pit	Create an outdoor cinema
Rule 5	Choose your zone: front or back	

Team	House	Zone	Scores		Total (out of 20)	Running Total (Round 1)
Team	House	Zone	Jim^{1}	Wendy	Total (out of 20)	Running Total (Round 1)
Carly & Leighton	Michelle & Steve's (Sydney, NSW)	Back Yard	6	7	13	13 / 20
Jemma & Ben	Michelle & Steve's (Sydney, NSW)	Front Yard	7	7	14	14 / 20
Michelle & Steve	Carly & Leighton's (Adelaide, SA)	Back Yard	7	8	15	15 / 20
Nick & Chris	Carly & Leighton's (Adelaide, SA)	Front Yard	5	6	11	11 / 20

==== Round 2 ====
- Episodes 27
- Airdate — 30 June 2013
- Description — The teams continue on to round 2 of the exterior renovations in Perth and Melbourne to transform the gardens and house exterior in 3 and a half days. Teams are allocated to the front or back yard of either Jemma & Ben's or Nick & Chris' house. At the end of this round, the two lowest scoring teams will be eliminated.

Renovation summary
Round 2
House Rules	Jemma & Ben's (WA)	Nick & Chris' (VIC)
Rule 1	Design a private backyard entertainment area	Modernise our Californian Bungalow
Rule 2	Create a welcoming front garden	Give us a modern low maintenance garden
Rule 3	Revive the tired exterior	Build the ultimate café-style courtyard
Rule 4	Give our lions pride of place	Plant a veggie patch
Rule 5	Choose your zone: front or back	

Team	House	Zone	Scores		Total (out of 20)	Final Total (Round 1 & 2)
Team	House	Zone	Jim^{1}	Wendy	Total (out of 20)	Final Total (Round 1 & 2)
Carly & Leighton	Jemma & Ben's (Perth, WA)	Front Yard	9	9	18	1st (31)
Nick & Chris	Jemma & Ben's (Perth, WA)	Back Yard	7	8	15	3rd (26)
Michelle & Steve	Nick & Chris' (Melbourne, VIC)	Front Yard	8	7	15	2nd (30)
Jemma & Ben	Nick & Chris' (Melbourne, VIC)	Back Yard	6	5	11	4th (25)

Note:

- ^1 - The exterior garden renovations were judged by landscape designer, Jim Fogarty along with Wendy Moore.

=== Grand Final: Final Renovation and Australia's Vote ===
- Episode 28
- Airdate — 1 July 2013
- Description — The final two teams completed one final challenge at their opponent's home, renovating a spare/secret room as a blank canvas, though they were not scored on these rooms. The Australian public voted for their favourite team to win. The winner was decided by the public votes.

Renovation Summary
Grand Final
House Rules	Carly & Leighton's (SA) & Michelle & Steve's (NSW)	
Rule 1	Find the blank canvas in need of renovation	
Rule 2	Give your opposition the space of their dreams	
Rule 3	Think outside the box	
Rule 4	Make your room the ultimate design statement	
Rule 5	You only have 3 days	
Team	Zone	Final Result
Carly & Leighton	M&S Spare Room - Entertainment Area	Winners
Michelle & Steve	C&L Spare Room - Garden Studio	Runners-up

== Ratings ==
Colour key:
– Highest rating during the season
– Lowest rating during the season

Wk.	Ep no.	Episode titles by stage of season			Air date	Viewers (millions)^{[a]}	Nightly rank^{[a]}	Source
1	1	Phase 1: Interior Renovations	WA Renovation (Jemma & Ben)	Introduction	Tuesday, 14 May	0.803	#11	
1	2	Phase 1: Interior Renovations	WA Renovation (Jemma & Ben)	Renovation continues	Wednesday, 15 May	0.784	#11	
1	3	Phase 1: Interior Renovations	WA Renovation (Jemma & Ben)	Renovation continues	Thursday, 16 May	0.687	#12	
1	4	Phase 1: Interior Renovations	WA Renovation (Jemma & Ben)	House reveal	Monday, 20 May	1.036	#7	
2	5	Phase 1: Interior Renovations	TAS Renovation (Jane & Plinio)	Introduction	Tuesday, 21 May	0.954	#9	
2	6	Phase 1: Interior Renovations	TAS Renovation (Jane & Plinio)	Renovation continues	Wednesday, 22 May	0.900	#11	
2	7	Phase 1: Interior Renovations	TAS Renovation (Jane & Plinio)	Renovation continues	Thursday, 23 May	0.898	#9	
2	8	Phase 1: Interior Renovations	TAS Renovation (Jane & Plinio)	House reveal	Monday, 27 May	1.072	#6	
3	9	Phase 1: Interior Renovations	VIC Renovation (Nick & Chris)	Introduction	Tuesday, 28 May	0.908	#11	
3	10	Phase 1: Interior Renovations	VIC Renovation (Nick & Chris)	Renovation continues	Wednesday, 29 May	0.951	#8	
3	11	Phase 1: Interior Renovations	VIC Renovation (Nick & Chris)	Renovation continues	Thursday, 30 May	1.007	#4	
3	12	Phase 1: Interior Renovations	VIC Renovation (Nick & Chris)	House reveal	Monday, 3 June	1.306	#4	
4	13	Phase 1: Interior Renovations	SA Renovation (Carly & Leighton)	Introduction	Tuesday, 4 June	0.908	#11	
4	14	Phase 1: Interior Renovations	SA Renovation (Carly & Leighton)	Renovation continues	Wednesday, 5 June	0.630	#17	
4	15	Phase 1: Interior Renovations	SA Renovation (Carly & Leighton)	Renovation continues	Thursday, 6 June	1.066	#4	
4	16	Phase 1: Interior Renovations	SA Renovation (Carly & Leighton)	House reveal	Monday, 10 June	1.365	#6	
5	17	Phase 1: Interior Renovations	QLD Renovation (Amy & Sean)	Introduction	Tuesday, 11 June	1.093	#6	
5	18	Phase 1: Interior Renovations	QLD Renovation (Amy & Sean)	Renovation continues	Wednesday, 12 June	1.139	#5	
5	19	Phase 1: Interior Renovations	QLD Renovation (Amy & Sean)	Renovation continues	Thursday, 13 June	1.236	#4	
5	20	Phase 1: Interior Renovations	QLD Renovation (Amy & Sean)	House reveal	Monday, 17 June	1.390	#4	
6	21	Phase 1: Interior Renovations	NSW Renovation (Michelle & Steve)	Introduction	Tuesday, 18 June	1.059	#3	
6	22	Phase 1: Interior Renovations	NSW Renovation (Michelle & Steve)	Renovation continues	Wednesday, 19 June	1.130	#4	
6	23	Phase 1: Interior Renovations	NSW Renovation (Michelle & Steve)	Renovation continues	Thursday, 20 June	1.219	#3	
6	24	Phase 1: Interior Renovations	NSW Renovation (Michelle & Steve)	House reveal & Elimination	Monday, 24 June	1.540	#1	
7	25	Phase 2: 24 Hour Fix-Up		Renovation & Elimination	Tuesday, 25 June	1.474	#1	
7	26	Phase 3: Gardens & Exteriors		Round 1: SA and NSW	Wednesday, 26 June^{[b]}	0.713	#16	
7	26	Phase 3: Gardens & Exteriors		Round 1: SA and NSW	Thursday, 27 June^{[c]}	0.485	#18	
7	27	Phase 3: Gardens & Exteriors		Round 2: VIC and WA & Elimination	Sunday, 30 June	1.280	#5	
8	28	Grand Final		Live episode	Monday, 1 July	1.530	#2	
8	28	Grand Final		Winner announced	Monday, 1 July	1.837	#1	
Season Average - 1.194

^{a} Ratings data used is from OzTAM and represents the live and same day average viewership from the 5 largest Australian metropolitan centres (Sydney, Melbourne, Brisbane, Perth and Adelaide).

== Notes ==
- ^{b} Melbourne, Adelaide & Perth only
- ^{c} Sydney & Brisbane only
