= House Rules (2013 TV series) =

- Genre: Reality; Renovation
- Presented by: Johanna Griggs (2013–19); Jamie Durie (2020); Abbey Way (2020)
- Judges: Jim Fogarty (2013); Joe Snell (2013–16); Wendy Moore (2013–19); Drew Heath (2017–18); Laurence Llewelyn-Bowen (2017–20); Jamie Durie (2019); Kyly Clarke (2020); Saul Myers (2020)
- Opening theme: "Life in Color" by OneRepublic (Season 1); "Change Your Life" by Little Mix (Season 2–3); "Best Day of My Life" by American Authors (Season 4–5)
- Country of origin: Australia
- Original language: English
- No. of seasons: 8
- No. of episodes: 293

Production
- Executive producers: Rikkie Proost, Maxine Gray
- Production location: Australia-wide
- Production company: Seven Network (Operations) Limited

Original release
- Network: Seven Network
- Release: 14 May 2013 – 7 June 2020

Related
- My Kitchen Rules; Dream Home

House Rules is an Australian reality television series broadcast on the Seven Network. The series follows state-based teams of two who renovate each other's homes, with the team receiving the highest score winning an ultimate prize. The series is produced by the team who created the Seven reality show My Kitchen Rules.

House Rules premiered on 14 April 2013 and steadily gained viewers throughout its first season. The show's eighth season premiered on 6 April 2020. Seven did not renew the series for a ninth season at their annual upfronts in October 2020, however suggested the show may return in future.

In October 2021, during Seven's annual upfronts, it was announced a spin-off series, titled Apartment Rules, would originally air in 2022, As of June 2025, the series never went into production. In 2026, a new renovation show using the Rules branding, titled My Reno Rules was announced, with Chris Brown announced as host.

== Format ==
Paired teams (mostly couples) from different states complete rounds of renovations in homes and gardens in a competition to win an ultimate prize. All homes that belong to the contestants are transformed throughout the show.

=== Format changes ===
In season 2, Jim Fogarty (judge of the garden rounds in season 1), did not return as Wendy Moore and Joe Snell took over the garden rounds judging. In season 5, two new judges were introduced, Laurence Llewelyn-Bowen and Drew Heath, who both joined Wendy Moore as judges. Judge of seasons 1–4, Joe Snell, did not return. In season 7, Jamie Durie replaced Drew Heath as a new judge. In season 8, Jamie Durie replaced Joh Griggs as series host alongside a new co-host, Abbey Gelmi, Kyly Clarke, and Saul Myers joined Laurence Llewelyn-Bowen as new series judges.

For seasons 1–4, the ultimate prize was having their mortgage paid off. In season 5, the winning team received $200,000. In season 6, the amount of prize money was decided by the first challenge during which the contestants renovated a house which was sold at auction. The $355,000 profit became the prize money. In season 7, the winning contestants won $250,000. In season 8, the winning contestants won $100,000.

The Grand Finals of seasons 1–4, were televised live with the winners decided by a combination of the judges' scores and the viewers' vote. Since season 5, there has not been a Live Grand Final: the team that received highest score from the judges won the series.

== Hosts and judges ==
Timeline of hosts, judges, and other personnel
| Hosts | Seasons | | | | | | | |
| Hosts | 1 | 2 | 3 | 4 | 5 | 6 | 7 | 8 |
|---|---|---|---|---|---|---|---|---|
| Carolyn Burn-McCrave | Design Advisor | | | | | | | |
| Laurence Llewelyn-Bowen | | | | | Judge | | | |
| Jamie Durie | | | | | | | Judge | Host |
| Abbey Way | | | | | | | | Co-host |
| Kyly Clarke | | | | | | | | Judge |
| Saul Myers | | | | | | | | Judge |
| Johanna Griggs | Host | | | | | | | |
| Wendy Moore | Judge | | | | | | | |
| Joe Snell | Judge | | | | | | | |
| Chester Drife | Build Supervisor | | | | | | | |
| Jim Fogarty | Judge | | | | | | | |
| Drew Heath | | | | | Judge | | | |

=== Judges ===
At the end of each renovation, the judges review every zone in the house and score each team out of 10 for their efforts. From season 2, judges verdicts were delivered face to face in front of the contestants.

| Judge | Occupation | Series run |
|---|---|---|
| Laurence Llewelyn-Bowen | International Design Stylist | Season 5–8 |
| Kyly Clarke | Interior Designer | Season 8 |
| Saul Myers | Home Builder | Season 8 |
| Jim Fogarty | Garden Judge | Season 1 |
| Joe Snell | Architect/Designer | Season 1–4 |
| Drew Heath | Architect | Season 5–6 |
| Wendy Moore | Editor of 'Home Beautiful' magazine | Season 1–7 |
| Jamie Durie | Landscaper | Season 7 |

=== Experts ===
The role of the experts is to assist and guide the contestants throughout each renovation. They need to make sure the house construction and design flows and also settle any disputes between teams.

| Expert | Occupation | Series run |
|---|---|---|
| Carolyn; Burns-McCrave | Interior Designer | Season 1–8 |
| Chester Drife | Build Supervisor | Season 1–2 |

== Series details ==
| Season | Title | Episodes | Originally aired | | Result | |
| Season | Title | Episodes | Season premiere | Season finale | Winning team | Prize |
|---|---|---|---|---|---|---|
| 1 | House Rules 2013 | 28 | 14 May 2013 | 1 July 2013 | Carly Schulz & Leighton Brow | Full Mortgage Payment |
| 2 | House Rules 2014 | 37 | 30 April 2014 | 6 July 2014 | Adam Dovile & Lisa Lamond | Full Mortgage Payment |
| 3 | House Rules 2015 | 39 | 5 May 2015 | 20 July 2015 | Steve & Tiana Falzon | Full Mortgage Payment |
| 4 | Crowded House Rules | 35 | 27 April 2016 | 3 July 2016 | Luke & Cody Cook | Full Mortgage Payment |
| 5 | House Rules 2017 | 35 | 30 April 2017 | 9 July 2017 | Aaron & Daniella Winter | $200,000 |
| 6 | House Rules 2018 | 46 | 7 May 2018 | 30 July 2018 | Toad Heffernan & Mandy Stone | $355,000 |
| 7 | House Rules 2019 | 43 | 28 April 2019 | 23 July 2019 | Pete & Courtney Tserbis | $250,000 |
| 8 | High Stakes | 30 | 6 April 2020 | 7 June 2020 | Kimmy & Rhi Harris | $100,000 |

| Season | Premiere date | Finale date | Winners | Runners-up | Other competing teams (elimination order) |
|---|---|---|---|---|---|
| 1 | 14 May 2013 | 1 July 2013 | Carly Schulz & Leighton Brow (SA) | Michelle & Steve Ball (NSW) | Jane Polley & Plinio Taurian (TAS); Amy Garrett & Sean Cornish (QLD); Jemma Blenkinsop & Ben Van Ryt (WA); Nick & Chris Stavropoulos (VIC) |
| 2 | 30 April 2014 | 6 July 2014 | Adam Dovile & Lisa Lamond (VIC) | Carole & Russell Bramston (WA) | Brooke Strong & Grant Lovekin (TAS); Michael 'Bomber' Bamford & Mel Chatfield (SA); Maddi Carter & Lloyd Wright (QLD); Candy Stuart & Ryan Pusic (NSW) |
| 3 | 5 May 2015 | 20 July 2015 | Steve & Tiana Falzon (NSW) | Ben & Danielle Edgeworth (QLD) | Karina & Brian Day (WA); Cassie Allan & Matt Smith (TAS); Ryan Rebbeck & Marlee Murphy (SA); Bronik Davies & Corrine Ziemer (VIC) |
| 4 | 27 April 2016 | 3 July 2016 | Luke & Cody Cook (QLD) | Claire Lintzeris & Hagan Rice (VIC) | Rose & Rob Plater (WA); Nancy & Daniel Frilay (NSW); Brooke & Michelle Fogden (SA); Fil & Joe (VIC) |
| 5 | 30 April 2017 | 9 July 2017 | Aaron & Daniella Winter (QLD) | Kate Whiting & James "Harry" Harris (SA) | Troy Campbell & Bec Herning (NSW); Fiona Taylor & Nicole Prince (VIC); Sean Mackay & Ella Cuthbert (TAS); Andrew & Jono King (WA) |
| 6 | 7 May 2018 | 30 July 2018 | Toad Heffernan & Amanda "Mandy" Stone (NSW) | Mel & Dave Wilmott (QLD) | Leigh & Kristie Treeby (VIC); Kim & Michelle (NSW); Josh & Brandon Jarius (QLD); Jared Petrenko & Jessica Dover (SA); Chiara & David Clarson (WA) |
| 7 | 28 April 2019 | 23 July 2019 | Pete Tserbis & Courtney Reardon (VIC) | Tim Clark & Mat Cassim (VIC) | Mikaela & Eliza Greene (WA); Katie & Alex Middlemiss (NSW); Shayn & Carly Clark (QLD); Lisa & Andy Carman (SA) |
| 8 | 6 April 2020 | 7 June 2020 | Kimmy & Rhi Harris (TAS) | Kayne & Aimee Stanton (VIC) | Carly & Andrew (QLD); Susan & Anthony (VIC); Tanya & Dave Dawes (WA); Lenore McDermid & Bradley McLennan (NSW); Tamara Grant & Rhys Bennett (QLD); Laith Abu-Ali & George Batarseh (NSW) |

== Renovation Phases ==
=== Seasons 1–5 ===
==== Phase 1: Interior Renovation ====
The six teams travelled around the country to completely renovate each other's homes. Every week, one team handed over their house to their opponents for a complete interior transformation. A set of rules from the owners were provided to the teams known as the 'House Rules' which needed to be followed to gain high scores from the judges and the homeowner team. At the end of the interior renovations, one team was eliminated.

==== Phase 2: 24 Hour Fix-up ====
After the first six full house interior renovations, all teams returned to their own homes and renovated a nominated zone or zones within 24 hours. Teams needed to recreate the space/s to reflect their own style and to impress the judges. All teams received the same set of five rules for the challenge. Scores were added to the current totals, with the lowest scoring team overall eliminated.

==== Phase 3: Gardens & Exteriors ====
The top 4 teams were challenged to transform the exteriors and gardens of each other's homes. Two teams were allocated to a home (that did not belong to them) and renovated either the front or back yards, while also improving the exterior of the house. After both rounds were completed, the lowest scoring team was eliminated.

==== Phase 4: Charity House ====
Starting in season 2, the top three teams renovated an old charity house. The rules for this challenge were very similar to the first interior renovations, where each team renovated zone allocated through a random card draw. The two highest scoring teams advanced to the Grand Final and one team was eliminated.

==== Grand Final: Final Renovations & Australia's Vote ====
The final 2 teams completed one final challenge to renovate an additional room of their opponent's homes. The Australian public voted for their favourite team to win with the winner decided by a combination of the judges' scores for the final project and overall viewer votes. The team with the highest score won the season, which was announced live.

=== Season 6 ===
==== Phase 1: Auction House ====
The teams had seven days to renovate a house which was auctioned. Any profit they from that auction became the prize money for this season. In addition, the teams had to follow the rules given by the judges. No team was eliminated during this phase of the competition.

==== Phase 2: Interior Renovation ====
The seven teams travelled around the country to completely renovate each other's homes. Every week, one team handed over their house to their opponents for a complete interior transformation. A set of 'House Rules' from the owners were provided to the teams and needed to be followed to high scores from the judges and the homeowner team. One team was eliminated following the interior renovations.

==== Phase 3: Back Yards ====
The remaining 6 teams are challenged to transform the exteriors and gardens of each other's homes. Two teams are allocated to a home (that do not belong to them) and must renovate either the front or back yards, as well as improving the house exterior. They are held over three rounds, covering all houses of the current teams. After all three rounds are complete, the 3 lowest scoring teams are eliminated.

==== Phase 4: Give back round (semi final) ====
The three remaining teams have four days to renovate the entire house of a potential contestant that had some bad luck thrown their way. The lowest scoring team is eliminated. The remaining two teams are put through to the Grand Final.

==== Grand Final (front yards) ====
The two remaining teams had to renovate each other's front yard, the team that received the highest score from the judges were crowned the series winners.

=== Season 7 ===
==== Phase 1: Warehouse Apartment ====
The teams had three days to renovate a room each in a warehouse apartment (which is above their new home base). The highest scoring team will receive an advantage for the first interior renovation.

==== Phase 2: Interior Renovation ====
The six teams traveled around the country to completely renovate each other's home. Every week, one team handed over their house to their opponents for a complete interior transformation. A set of rules from the owners were given to the teams known as the 'House Rules' which needed to be followed to gain high scores from the judges and the homeowner team. One team was eliminated following the interior renovations.

==== Phase 3: Give Back House ====
The five remaining teams had to renovate the entire house of a potential contestant that had some bad luck thrown their way. The lowest scoring team is eliminated.

==== Phase 4: Gardens & Exteriors ====
The top 4 teams are challenged to transform the exteriors and gardens of each other's homes. Three teams are allocated to a home (that do not belong to them) and must renovate a zoned area in the gardens, as well as improving the house exterior. They are held over four rounds, covering all houses of the current teams. After the rounds are complete, the lowest scoring team is eliminated. The remaining three teams are put through to the Grand Final.

==== Grand Final ====
The final three teams have 7 days to renovate a loft apartment. The team that receives the highest score won the season.

=== Season 8 ===
==== Elimination rounds ====
The season began with eight teams, however over two rounds, two teams were eliminated. Each round consist of renovating one half of a Gold Coast Penthouse per round, the lowest scoring team from each round will be eliminated whilst the other six will receive a spot in the competition.

==== Interior Renovation ====
The six remaining teams travel around the country to completely renovate each other's home. Every week, one team hands over their house to their opponents for a complete interior transformation. A set of rules from the owners are given to the teams known as the 'House rules' which need to be followed to gain high scores from the judges and the homeowner team. At the end of the interior renovations, two teams are eliminated.

==== Grand Final ====
The remaining 4 teams completed one final challenge to renovate a Nano-Homes freight house with no demolition required for an individual who has lost his home due to circumstances beyond his control. The winner was decided by the judges' scores for the final project. The team with the highest score won the season.

== Season Synopses ==
Color key

Winner Runner-up Eliminated Withdrew

=== Season 1 (2013) ===
Season 1 aired on 14 April 2013 and ended on 6 May 2013. The season was won by South Australian couple Carly Schulz and Leighton Brow and as a reward had their mortgage of $460,000 paid off.

| # | Team | Ages | House | Relationship | Mortgage | Status |
|---|---|---|---|---|---|---|
| 1 | Carly Schulz & Leighton Brow | 31 & 32 | Adelaide, SA | Couple Two Years | $460,000 | Winners |
| 2 | Michelle & Steve Ball | 48 | Sydney, NSW | Married 27 Years | $629,000 | Runners-Up |
| 3 | Jemma Blenkinsop & Ben Van Ryt | 26 & 27 | Perth, WA | Just Married | $545,000 | Phase 3 (Gardens-Round 2) |
| 4 | Nick & Chris Stavropoulos | 22 & 27 | Melbourne, VIC | Brothers | $524,000 | Phase 3 (Gardens-Round 2) |
| 5 | Amy Garrett & Sean Cornish | 30 & 26 | Brisbane, QLD | Engaged | $300,000 | Phase 2 (24 Hour Fix-Up) |
| 6 | Jane Polley & Plinio Taurian | | Hobart, TAS | Married with children | $315,000 | Phase 1 (Interior Renovation) |

=== Season 2 (2014) ===
Season 2 was confirmed in 2013 and began airing on 30 April 2014. The season was won by Victorian couple Adam Dovile & Lisa Lamond and had their mortgage of $520,000 paid off.

After the series, Doville joined Better Homes & Gardens in 2015 as a DIY presenter.

| # | Team | Ages | House | Relationship | Mortgage | Status |
|---|---|---|---|---|---|---|
| 1 | Adam Dovile & Lisa Lamond | 31 & 29 | Melbourne, VIC | Engaged | $520,000 | Winners |
| 2 | Carole & Russell Bramston | 52 & 55 | Perth, WA | Empty Nesters | $290,000 | Runners-Up |
| 3 | Candy Stuart & Ryan Pusic | 26 & 29 | Sydney, NSW | Partners | $400,000 | Phase 4 (Charity House) |
| 4 | Maddi Carter and Lloyd Wright | 27 & 28 | Townsville, QLD | Soon to be married | $369,000 | Phase 3 (Gardens-Round 2) |
| 5 | Michael Bamford & Mel Chatfield | | Adelaide, SA | Newly Dating | $380,000 | Phase 2 (24 Hour Fix-Up) |
| 6 | Brooke Strong & Grant Lovekin | | Huon Valley, TAS | Partners, 7 kids | $258,000 | Phase 1 (Interior Renovation) |

=== Season 3 (2015) ===
Season 3 was confirmed in 2014 and began airing on 5 May 2015.

The season was won by New South Wales team Steve & Tiana Falzon and had their mortgage of $250,000 paid off.

| # | Team | Ages | House | Relationship | Mortgage | Status |
|---|---|---|---|---|---|---|
| 1 | Steve & Tiana Falzon | 47 & 26 | Sydney, NSW | Father & Daughter | $250,000 | Winners |
| 2 | Ben & Danielle Edgeworth | 32 & 31 | Brisbane, QLD | Newly Married | $405,000 | Runners-Up |
| 3 | Bronik Davies & Corrine Ziemer | 27 & 28 | Melbourne, VIC | Melbourne Lovers | $448,000 | Phase 4 (Charity House) |
| 4 | Ryan Rebbeck & Marlee Murphy | 29 & 26 | Adelaide, SA | Young Contenders | $229,000 | Phase 3 (Gardens - Round 2) |
| 5 | Cassie Allan & Matt Smith | 31 | Hobart, TAS | Tassie Go-getters | $248,000 | Phase 2 (Holiday House) |
| 6 | Karina & Brian Day | 42 & 44 | Geraldton, WA | Married with Kids | $360,000 | Phase 1 (Interior Renovation & 24 Hour Fix-Up) |

=== Season 4 (2016) ===
Season 4 was confirmed in 2014 and was set to later in 2015, but Network Seven shelved the series until 2016 due to an overload of renovation shows that had aired in 2015 and the lower than expected ratings for the third series. The season titled "Crowded House rules", which involves couples with families (excluding one), began airing on 27 April 2016.

The season was won by Queensland brothers Luke & Cody Cook and had their mortgage of $120,000 paid off.

| # | Team | Ages | House | Relationship | Mortgage | Status |
|---|---|---|---|---|---|---|
| 1 | Luke & Cody Cook | 23 | Dalby, QLD | Country Twin Brothers | $120,000 | Winners |
| 2 | Claire Lintzeris & Hagan Rice | 28 & 27 | Mornington Peninsula, VIC | Hairdresser & Plumber | $269,000 | Runners-Up |
| 3 | Fil & Joe | 45 & 48 | Melbourne, VIC | Experienced Renovators | $568,000 | Phase 4 (Charity Unit Makeover) |
| 4 | Brooke & Michelle Fogden | 43 & 42 | Adelaide, SA | Landscaper & Graphic; Designer | $426,000 | Phase 3 (Gardens-Round 2) |
| 5 | Nancy & Daniel Frilay | | Sydney, NSW | Reno Rookies | $500,000 | Phase 2 (24 Hour Fix-Up) |
| 6 | Rose & Rob Plater | 29 & 41 | Rockingham, WA | Navy Parents | $342,000 | Phase 1 (Interior Renovation) |

=== Season 5 (2017) ===
Applications for the fifth season of House Rules were open between 1 June & 30 July 2016 on the House Rules official network seven website. Johanna Griggs announced the series is in pre-production and that she is returning as host for season 5. Season 5 was officially confirmed in October 2016. This season will introduce two new judges: international design stylist, Laurence Llewelyn-Bowen and award-winning Australian architect and builder, Drew Heath, who will be joining Wendy Moore. Joe Snell will not be returning. The season began airing on 30 April 2017.

The season was won by Queensland couple Aaron & Daniella Winter and received $200,000 in prize money.

| Team | | Ages | House | Relationship | Status |
|---|---|---|---|---|---|
| 1 | Aaron & Daniella Winter | 31 & 38 | Gold Coast, QLD | Gold Coast Couple | Winners |
| 2 | Kate Whiting & James “Harry” Harris | 29 & 32 | Adelaide, SA | Teacher & Chippie | Runners-up |
| 3 | Andrew & Jono King | 27 | Mandurah, WA | Geek Twins | Phase 4 (Charity Unit Makeover) |
| 4 | Sean Mackay & Ella Cuthbert | 24 | Hobart, TAS | Engaged Ambos | Phase 3 (Gardens - Round 2) |
| 5 | Fiona Taylor & Nicole Prince | 44 | Lake Fyan, VIC | Best Friends | Phase 2 (24 Hour Fix-Up) |
| 6 | Troy Campbell & Bec Herning | 46 & 39 | Heckenberg, New South Wales | Battlers | Phase 1 (Interior Renovation) |

=== Season 6 (2018) ===
Season 6 was confirmed in June 2017 with Applications for the sixth season of House Rules open between 3 June & 31 August 2017 on the House Rules official network seven website. Season 6 was officially confirmed in October 2017. This will be the first season to include seven teams instead of the conventional six teams like in previous seasons. The season began airing on 7 May 2018.

| Team | | Ages | House | Relationship | Status |
|---|---|---|---|---|---|
| 1 | Toad Heffernan & Mandy Stone | 32 & 28 | Candelo, NSW | Engaged Dairy Farmers | Winners |
| 2 | Dave & Mel Willmot | 34 & 32 | Hope Island, QLD | Married Go-getters | Runners-up |
| 3 | Chiara & David Clarson | 32 & 38 | Yangebup, WA | Married Hot-heads | Phase 3 (Give Back Makeover) |
| 4 | Josh & Brandon Jarius | 23 & 21 | Maryborough, QLD | Chippie Brothers | Phase 2 (Back Yards) |
| = 5 | Kim & Michelle | 59 & 27 | Tweed Heads, NSW | Mother & Daughter | Phase 2 (Back Yards) |
| = 5 | Jared Petrenko & Jessica Dover | 28 & 25 | Adelaide, SA | Dating 2 Years | Phase 2 (Back Yards) |
| 7 | Leigh & Kristie Treeby | 33 & 36 | Rye, VIC | Competitive Couple | Phase 1 (Interior Renovation) |

=== Season 7 (2019) ===
Season 7 was confirmed in June 2018 with Applications for the seventh season of House Rules open between June & 7 September 2018 on the House Rules official network seven website. Season 7 was officially confirmed in October 2018, as well with the announcement of new judge, Jamie Durie, who will be replacing Drew Heath in 2019. Production for the series began in November 2018. The season began airing on 28 April 2019.

The season was won by Victoria couple Pete & Courtney Tserbis and received $250,000 in prize money.

| Team | | Ages | House | Relationship | Status |
|---|---|---|---|---|---|
| 1 | Pete & Courtney Tserbis | 32 & 31 | Ferntree Gully, VIC | Married Dance Teachers | Winners |
| 2 | Tim Clark & Mat Cassim | 32 & 27 | Thornbury, VIC | Melbourne Brothers | Runners-up |
| 3 | Lisa & Andy Carman | 30 & 32 | Adelaide, SA | Hostie & Fireman | Third Place |
| 4 | Shayn & Carly Clark | 33 & 31 | Aroona, QLD | Sunny Coast Couple | Phase 3 (Gardens & Exteriors) |
| 5 | Katie & Alex Middlemiss | 29 & 32 | Gundaroo, NSW | Small Town Parents | Phase 2 (Give Back House) |
| 6 | Mikaela & Eliza Greene | 24 & 21 | Yallingup, WA | Surfer Sisters | Phase 1 (Interior Renovation) |

=== Season 8 (2020) ===
Applications for Season 8 opened early in November 2018 and was confirmed in the seventh seasons grand final on the House Rules official network seven website. In July 2019, after seven seasons, Johanna Griggs announced she would not be returning as series host. In September 2019, Wendy Moore announced she would not be returning as series judge.

On 23 October 2019, the series was officially renewed for an eighth season which will be titled "House Rules: High Stakes" and for the first time will include eight teams, as well with the announcement of two new judges, interior designer Kyly Clarke and home builder Saul Myers, Laurence Llewelyn-Bowen will retain his role as judge, however Jamie Durie will become the new series host, along with new co-host Abbey Gelmi.

The season was originally set to begin airing on 5 April 2020, however premiered on 6 April 2020.

The season was won by Tasmanian twins Kimmy & Rhi Harris and received $100,000 in prize money.

| Team | | Ages | House | Relationship | Status |
|---|---|---|---|---|---|
| 1 | Kimmy & Rhi Harris | Both 31 | Launceston, TAS | Twin Sisters | Winners |
| 2 | Kayne & Aimee Stanton | 37 & 26 | Cranbourne, VIC | Plumber Couple | Runners-Up |
| 3 | Laith Abu-Ali & George Batarseh | 29 & 30 | Sydney, NSW | Best Mates | Third Place |
| 4 | Tamara Grant & Rhys Bennett | 28 & 29 | Brisbane, QLD | Lawyer & Fitness Pro (Couple) | Fourth Place |
| 5 | Lenore McDermid & Bradley McLennan | 55 & 31 | Greystanes, NSW | Mother & Son | Eliminated (Interior Renovation) |
| 6 | Tanya & Dave Dawes | 38 & 36 | Perth, WA | Married with children | Eliminated (Interior Renovation) |
| - | Susan & Anthony Lobriza | 31 & 27 | Berwick, VIC | Married Cheerleaders | Eliminated (Elimination Round 2) |
| - | Carly & Andrew | 38 & 46 | Brisbane, QLD | Married Straight Shooters | Withdrew (Elimination Round 1) |

== Viewership ==
The first season debuted to 803,000 viewers. Over the season, viewership started to grow significantly The season ended on a high of 1.53 million watching the finale and 1.83 million watching the winner's announcement. Including regional areas, the finale was watched by 2.42 million and 2.86 million watching winner announced.

The second season premiered to 1,183,000 million viewers and was the highest rated entertainment show of the night. The season final held 1.73 million watching the finale and 1.98 million watching the winner's announcement, and when including regional areas, the finale was watched by 2.75 million and 3.12 million watching winner announced.

The third season premiered to 791,000 viewers. The season final ended on a low of 1.09 million watching the finale and 1.29 million watching the winner's announcement, and when including regional areas, the finale was watched by 1.75 million and 1.99 million watching winner announced.

The fourth season premiered to 718,000 viewers. The season final ended on a low of 1.14 million watching the finale and 1.19 million watching the winner's announcement, but when including regional areas, the finale was watched by 1.95 million and 2.14 million watching winner announced, making it higher than the previous season.

The fifth season premiered to 1 million viewers, up 300,000 viewers from the previous season and being the second highest opening behind the second season. The season final ended on a low on 1.01 million watching the finale and 1.14 million watching the winner's announcement, when including regional areas, the finale was watched by 1.64 million and 1.84 million watching winner announced, which is lower than the previous season.

The sixth season premiered to 607,000 viewers, which is thus far the lowest opening ratings across all of the House Rules seasons. The season final ended on a low on 853,000 watching the finale and 915,000 watching the winner's announcement, when including regional areas, the finale was watched by 1.39 million and 1.51 million watching winner announced, which is lower than the previous season.

| Season | Episodes | Premiere | | | Finale | | | | | Ref. |
| Season | Episodes | Date | Premiere Ratings (in millions) | Rank | Date | Grand Final (in millions) | Rank | Winner Announced (in millions) | Rank | Ref. |
|---|---|---|---|---|---|---|---|---|---|---|
| One | 28 | 14 May 2013 | 0.803 | 11 | 1 July 2013 | 1.530 | 2 | 1.837 | 1 | |
| Two | 37 | 30 April 2014 | 1.183 | 2 | 6 July 2014 | 1.730 | 2 | 1.988 | 1 | |
| Three | 39 | 5 May 2015 | 0.791 | 11 | 20 July 2015 | 1.097 | 6 | 1.295 | 3 | |
| Four | 35 | 27 April 2016 | 0.718 | 10 | 3 July 2016 | 1.144 | 4 | 1.193 | 3 | |
| Five | 35 | 30 April 2017 | 1.000 | 6 | 9 July 2017 | 1.007 | 5 | 1.142 | 4 | |
| Six | 46 | 7 May 2018 | 0.607 | 12 | 30 July 2018 | 0.853 | 9 | 0.915 | 6 | |
| Seven | 43 | 28 April 2019 | 0.782 | 6 | 23 July 2019 | 0.730 | 9 | —N/a | | |
| Eight | 30 | 6 April 2020 | 0.660 | 13 | 7 June 2020 | 0.585 | 7 | —N/a | | |

== Reno Rumble ==
Reno Rumble was a reality program which began airing on the Nine Network on 5 May 2015, that pit teams from House Rules against teams from Nine's TV series The Block. The program was not associated with the Seven Network or the House Rules format, other than for the fact Reno Rumble featured former House Rules contestants who are no longer contracted to Seven.

The series was renewed for a second season but did not involve any former contestants from either House Rules or The Block.

== International ==
=== Broadcasters ===
In Portugal, the reality show is broadcast every day at 11:00 p.m. on SIC Mulher (since May 2016) and in Angola, the reality show is broadcast every day at 01:30 p.m and 10:30 p.m on SIC Mulher internacional (since May 2016). On Belgium television, the show runs every weekday at 15u45 on vtm2.

In Spain, the show is broadcast as Reglas de casa and runs on Saturdays and Sundays from 11:30 a.m for 15 hours each day on TEN.

=== Adaptations ===
The Netherlands has remade House Rules which has been produced by Skyhigh TV for SBS channel Net5. A spin-off, Hotel Rules, broadcast in 2019 for the first time.

An Irish version of House Rules will air on TV3.

Germany will produce a local version which will be produced by RedSeven Entertainment, for broadcaster Sat.1.

An American adaptation of House Rules was announced by influencer Laro Benz, set to be broadcast in 2026 on Tubi. Benz would serve as the show's host.

New Zealand broadcaster Three has announced a local version of House Rules, set to be broadcast in 2023. On 6 August 2023, the series confirmed its host, judges and five teams and will premiere on 10 September 2023 on Three.

== See also ==
- The Block (Australian TV series)
- My Kitchen Rules
- The Renovators
- Reno Rumble
