= Auction Squad =

- Genre: Reality
- Written by: Helen Parker, Ross Gallen
- Directed by: Helen Parker
- Presented by: Johanna Griggs
- Starring: Will Dangar, Candy Day, Luke Dyer, Jason Hodges, Patrick Thompson
- Country of origin: Australia
- Original language: English
- No. of seasons: 3

Production
- Producers: Helen Parker, Ross Gallen
- Production location: Various
- Cinematography: Richard Fowler, Andre Eavis, Steve Davis
- Editor: Jasper Coady
- Running time: 60 minutes
- Production company: Beyond Productions

Original release
- Network: Seven Network
- Release: 13 February 2002 – 2005

Auction Squad is an Australian lifestyle television series aired on the Seven Network from 13 February 2002 until 2005. The show focused on renovating and improving houses that were going to be sold at auction, increasing their market value and pleasing their owners.

The renovations and improvements were carried out by the "Auction Squad" consisting of the presenter, landscapers, builders, carpenters, designers and laborers, with the renovations needing to be done in a twelve-hour day and under $10,000.

== Host ==
Auction Squad was hosted by Johanna Griggs.
