= Johanna Griggs =

Australian swimmer and television presenter

Johanna Griggs AM
Personal information
- Nationality: Australian
- Born: Johanna Leigh Griggs; 17 October 1973 (age 53) Sydney, New South Wales, Australia
- Occupation: Television presenter
- Years active: 1990–present
- Employer: Seven Network
- Spouses: Todd Huggins (since 2006); Gary Sweet (1994–1997)

Johanna Griggs
Medal record

Representing Australia

Women's Swimming

Commonwealth Games
| Bronze medal – third place | 1990 Auckland | 100 m backstroke |

Johanna Leigh Griggs AM (born 17 October 1973) is an Australian television presenter and former competitive swimmer. She won a bronze medal at the 1990 Commonwealth Games.

Griggs has been at the Seven Network since 1993 where she joined Seven Sport, first as a host at the Australian Open. She hosts the network's Olympic Games, Commonwealth Games and the Australian Open, as well as being a presenter of their Melbourne Cup coverage. She has been the host of Better Homes and Gardens since 2005 and House Rules from 2013 until 2019.

== Commonwealth Games – swimming career ==
Griggs represented Australia at the Auckland Commonwealth Games in 1990—winning a bronze medal in the 100m backstroke event.

Her career was cut short after a battle with chronic fatigue syndrome that began when she was 17. She had previously attempted a comeback in 1992; however, the exertion of that comeback attempt had hospitalised her with pleurisy, and it ultimately caused her to withdraw from the 1992 Olympic trials. Nevertheless, she was able to successfully make a comeback in 1993 for the 50-metre backstroke race at the Australian Swimming Championships in 1993, where Griggs recorded the fastest time in the world (that year) for the event. The day following that swim, she announced her retirement from competitive swimming.

== Television career ==
Griggs was the first guest on the long-running ABC programme Live and Sweaty. As part of the programme, sporting guests were asked to donate various body parts to the "Sporting Hall of Fame". Griggs donated her appendix.

She appeared as a Swedish tourist in an episode of Home and Away in 1992.

Griggs built a solid career in media, and in the late 1990s was a regular panelist on the Network Ten program Beauty and the Beast. At this time she was also dating rugby league footballer Luke Ricketson.

She later joined the Seven Network. Griggs hosted Australia's longest-running sports program, Sportsworld, with Matthew White on Sunday mornings from 2001 to 2006.

Griggs hosted several seasons of lifestyle type shows, including Auction Squad and House Calls to the Rescue. She participated in the Australian Open coverage, and she was the first Australian woman to solely host an Olympics coverage when she covered the 2002 Winter Olympics in Salt Lake City.

In 2005, she replaced Noni Hazlehurst as the primary host of the long-running lifestyle program Better Homes and Gardens.

In 2009, after previously acting as a fill-in presenter for Seven News Sydney weekend sports bulletin, she took on the role full-time, replacing Alex Cullen, who moved to the weeknight role. In November 2010, Griggs resigned from Seven News to spend more time with her family.

Griggs covers several sporting events for Seven Sport.

Griggs was critical of organisers of the 2018 Commonwealth Games when the competitors were not included in the closing ceremony.

== Personal life ==
Griggs grew up in the Sydney suburb of Harbord which is now known as Freshwater. She was previously married to actor Gary Sweet, with whom she had two sons.

On 25 November 2006, Griggs married building foreman Todd Huggins in a private ceremony at their home in Collaroy Plateau, Sydney.

In September 2009, Griggs was awarded an honorary Doctor of Letters from Macquarie University, Sydney. She was appointed a Member of the Order of Australia in the 2020 Australia Day Honours.

Media offices
| Preceded by Noni Hazelhurst | Better Homes And Gardens; Host; 2005–present | Incumbent |
| Preceded by Alex Cullen | Seven News Sydney; Weekend sport presenter 2009–2010 | Succeeded by Matt Carmichael |
| Preceded by Program created | House Rules; Host; 2013–2019 | Succeeded by Jamie Durie & Abbey Way |
