= Television ratings in Australia =

Measuring television viewership in Australia

Television ratings in Australia are used to determine the size and composition of audiences across Australian broadcast and subscription television, primarily for the purpose of informing advertisers what programming is popular with the audience they are attempting to sell their product or service to.

A 2016 report found that commercial television in Australia reaches 85.1% of the population aged over 13 years old (down from 93.1% in 2008) with viewership decreasing fastest in viewers aged under 50. The decline in free-to-air television audiences of recent years has been attributed to a tougher and more competitive environment brought about by video on demand and streaming services.

== History ==
Until 1991, AGB McNair provided television ratings data, covering only homes in Sydney and Melbourne. From 1991 until 2000, 'Nielsen Media Research Australia' was the company that measured television ratings, introducing People meters for the first time. From 2001 onwards, OzTAM and Regional TAM took over. OzTAM is wholly owned by the three commercial broadcasters (Seven Network, Nine Network and Network 10), while Regional TAM is owned by a number of regional broadcasters, however both operate independently.

As of 2023, OzTAM measures ratings from 5,250 homes in Sydney, Melbourne, Brisbane, Adelaide, and Perth, with these ratings commonly referred to as 'five city metro ratings'. A further 3,198 homes outside these five cities are measured by Regional TAM. Nielsen are contracted to provide the audience measurement services to both OzTAM and Regional TAM having previously operated their own measurement service.

From 27 December 2009, OzTAM and Regional TAM introduced time shift ratings, measuring viewers who watch a program within seven days of its first broadcast. Ratings reports were subsequently broken out into two parts:

- Overnight ratings – preliminary figures combining real-time viewing and 'as live' viewing (timeshifted and watched the same day of broadcast), which are released the following calendar day at 9 am AEST.
- Consolidated ratings – final figures combining overnight ratings and time-shifted viewing watched within 7 days of initial broadcast, which are released the afternoon of the following week.

In October 2014, Australia became the third country to introduce Nielsen Twitter TV ratings, measuring reach and activity of television related discussions on the social media platform.

From 3 April 2016, OzTAM began releasing timeshift viewing data for programs watched up to 28 days after broadcast, noting that genres such as dramas, mini-series and films could add up to 20% of their audience with the new data, even though viewing between 8 and 28 days after initial broadcast accounted for only 1.8% of total television viewing.

In May 2023, OzTAM introduced VOZ ("Virtual Australia"), a metric that combines the existing panels with usage data from the free-to-air networks' broadcast video on demand (BVOD) apps, and also enables overnight ratings to include data from BVOD usage.

== Measurements ==
In Australian media, the most common ratings metric reported publicly is total viewers of a program from all age groups. However, advertisers typically prefer the viewership of demographic ranges based on the type of viewers they are seeking to promote their product to. The three common aged-based demographic groups, known as the 'key demographics,' include people aged 16 to 39, 18 to 49 and 25 to 54.

In advertising and media, the reporting of ratings has historically been confined to five city metro numbers. Since the 2010s, it has become more common for television networks to promote "national" viewership numbers combining the OzTAM and Regional TAM numbers .

=== Non-ratings periods ===
While ratings data is collected year-round, the networks traditionally excluded two non-peak periods—a ten-week span over the summer (including the Christmas and New Year holidays), and a two-week period around Easter—from their ratings calculations, with these periods collectively referred to as "non-ratings periods" or "non-survey periods". The non-ratings periods are typically deemed to be of less importance, with domestic programming deemphasized in favour of reruns, and imported programmes from New Zealand and the United Kingdom (including local versions of multinational series also aired in Australia). The summer period has usually also featured an emphasis on sport, including cricket (such as Australia's home fixtures, and the Big Bash League) and tennis (such as the Australian Open, the first Grand Slam of the year).

In the mid-2020s, the networks began to increasingly deemphasise the concept of a 40-week television season, with Seven, Nine, and 10 having shifted to "calendar year" results for annual viewership that is inclusive of ratings during the "non-ratings" weeks, and OzTAM officially referring to the twelve weeks as "holiday periods". 10 moved series such as I'm a Celebrity...Get Me Out of Here! into the summer period in 2025, and in January 2026, Seven West Media's chief content officer Brook Hall stated that the concept was antiquated due to their year-round content investments across multiple platforms, explaining that "advertisers don't pause, audiences don't disappear, and neither do we."

== Ratings performance ==
In 1989, for the first time since 1978, the Seven Network overtook its rivals Nine Network and Network 10 in terms of average viewers and have remained ahead of Nine and Ten every year until 1994, where due to lower ratings than expected, and a launch of new programs not performing as hoped, the Nine Network defeated Seven Network and regained the title as the highest rating television network in Australia, with the latter relegated back to second highest for the first time in twelve years. In 1990, for the first time since OzTAM began, the Seven Network won all forty weeks of the official ratings period, and, as of 1994, has won the last five years of ratings consecutively throughout the late 1980s and early 1990.

From 1994 up until 2004, the Nine Network had generally been the ratings leader in Australia, typically followed by the Seven Network and Network Ten respectively. While Network Ten generally rates lower in total viewers, it has traditionally been the market leader for younger viewers. The two national broadcasters, ABC TV and SBS, typically attract fewer viewers than the three commercial networks due to their various public service obligations.

In 2005, for the first time since 2000, the late 1980s and early 1990s and 1978, the Seven Network overtook its rival Nine Network in terms of average viewers and have remained ahead of Nine and Ten every year until 2019, where due to lower ratings than expected, and a launch of new programs not performing as hoped, the Nine Network defeated Seven Network and regained the title as the highest rating television network in Australia, with the latter relegated back to second highest for the first time in twelve years. In 2011, for the first time since OzTAM began, the Seven Network won all forty weeks of the official ratings period, and, as of 2017, has won the last thirteen years of ratings consecutively.

As of 2016, FOX8 is the most viewed subscription channel on the Foxtel platform.

=== Top-rated programs per year ===
The highest-rated programs on Australian television typically include sporting events, reality shows and locally produced scripted programs. They do not factor in digital streaming services, nor do they account for aggregate ratings for events simulcast across multiple networks (e.g. in 2011 the wedding of Prince William and Catherine Middleton attracted over 6 million viewers spread across five networks).

Year	Program	Network	Rating	Notes/Ref
2025	2025 NRL Grand Final: Melbourne Storm versus Brisbane Broncos	Nine	4.550 million	
2024	2024 AFL Grand Final: Sydney Swans versus Brisbane Lions	Seven	4.024 million	
2023*	2023 FIFA Women's World Cup Semi Final: Australia versus England	Seven	7.13 million	The highest rated broadcast since Oztam ratings began.
2022	2022 Australian Open – Women's singles Final: Ash Barty versus Danielle Collins	Nine	4.1 million	
2021	2021 AFL Grand Final: Melbourne versus Western Bulldogs	Seven	3.91 million	
2020	2020 AFL Grand Final: Richmond versus Geelong	Seven	3.01 million	
2019	2019 State of Origin series Game I: Queensland versus New South Wales	Nine	3.23 million	
2018	2018 AFL Grand Final Presentations: West Coast Eagles versus Collingwood	Seven	2.62 million	
2017	2017 AFL Grand Final: Adelaide Crows versus Richmond	Seven	2.72 million	
2016	2016 AFL Grand Final Presentations: Sydney Swans versus Western Bulldogs	Seven	3.20 million	
2015	2015 Cricket World Cup Final	Nine/FOX Sports 3	3.9 million	2015 CWC Final was simulcast on both Nine and FOX Sports 3.
2014	2014 NRL Grand Final: South Sydney versus Canterbury	Nine	3.99 million	
2013	My Kitchen Rules finale	Seven	3.27 million	
2012	The Voice finale	Nine	3.33 million	
2011	The Block finale	Nine	3.37 million	
2010	MasterChef Australia finale	Ten	4.03 million	
2009	MasterChef Australia finale	Ten	3.72 million	
2008	2008 Summer Olympics opening ceremony	Seven	2.82 million	
2007	2007 AFL Grand Final Geelong versus Port Adelaide	Ten	2.56 million	
2006	2006 Commonwealth Games opening ceremony	Nine	3.56 million	
2005	2005 Australian Open – Men's Singles final: Lleyton Hewitt versus Marat Safin	Seven	4.04 million	
2004	Australian Idol finale	Ten	3.34 million	
2003	2003 Rugby World Cup Final Australia versus England	Seven	4.02 million	
2002	Test Australia: The National IQ Test	Nine	2.78 million	
2001	2001 Wimbledon Championships – Men's Singles final: Pat Rafter versus Goran Ivanisevic	Nine	3.04 million	

*Year to date.

=== Yearly shares ===
The following table lists the average shares for the survey period of the calendar year, for total viewers in the 5 metropolitan cities during primetime between 6pm and midnight. Prior to 2010, shares were not broken out into a network's different multi-channels.

Network	2008	2009	2010	2012	2014	2016	2018	2019	2020
ABC	N/A	N/A	11.9%	10.3%	10.4%	10.1%		9.6%	10.8%
ABC Family	N/A	N/A	1.3%	2.1%	2.2%	2.4%		2.2%	2.3%
ABC Entertains	N/A	N/A	0.4%	0.6%	0.7%	0.6%		0.5%	0.4%
ABC News	N/A	N/A	0.2%	0.7%	0.9%	1.1%		1.1%	1.5%
ABC channels	14.2%	14.0%	13.8%	13.7%	14.2%	14.2%		15.8%	15.1%
Channel Seven	N/A	N/A	20.2%	18.6%	17.8%	14.9%	20.6%	12.9%	15.5%
7two	N/A	N/A	2.8%	3.4%	3.7%	3.0%	3.7%	2.9%	2.8%
7mate	N/A	N/A	0.5%	2.7%	3.3%	2.6%	4.1%	2.5%	2.8%
7flix	N/A	N/A	N/A	N/A	N/A	2.3%	2.0%	1.6%	1.6%
7food network	N/A	N/A	N/A	N/A	N/A	N/A	N/A	0.6%	N/A
Seven Network	24.2%	23.0%	23.5%	24.7%	24.8%	22.8%	30.4%	20.5%	22.8%
Channel Nine	N/A	N/A	19.2%	17.7%	17.3%	14.8%		16.7%	16.2%
9Go!	N/A	N/A	3.1%	3.1%	3.8%	2.9%		2.7%	2.2%
9Gem	N/A	N/A	0.3%	2.1%	2.7%	2.1%		2.9%	2.3%
9Life	N/A	N/A	N/A	N/A	N/A	1.9%		1.7%	1.7%
9Rush	N/A	N/A	N/A	N/A	N/A	N/A		N/A	0.7%
Nine Network	21.9%	21.9%	22.7%	22.9%	23.8%	21.7%		24.0%	23.1%
Network 10	N/A	N/A	16.2%	10.5%	9.7%	10.0%		9.5%	9.9%
10 Bold Drama	N/A	N/A	1.1%	2.0%	2.4%	2.8%		2.8%	3.1%
10 Peach Comedy	N/A	N/A	N/A	2.5%	2.4%	2.3%		1.7%	1.9%
Nickelodeon	N/A	N/A	N/A	N/A	N/A	N/A		N/A	0.1%
Network 10	17.0%	18.4%	17.3%	15.1%	14.6%	15.1%		14.0%	15.0%
SBS	N/A	N/A	4.1%	3.7%	3.4%	3.8%	5.4%	4.0%	4.3%
SBS Viceland	N/A	N/A	0.5%	0.7%	0.7%	0.8%		1.0%	1.1%
NITV	N/A	N/A	N/A	0.0%	0.1%	0.2%		0.1%	0.1%
SBS Food	N/A	N/A	N/A	N/A	N/A	0.9%		0.8%	0.8%
SBS World Movies	N/A	N/A	N/A	N/A	N/A	N/A		0.3%	0.8%
SBS channels	4.6%	4.8%	4.6%	4.4%	4.2%	5.7%	7.6%	6.3%	7.1%
Subscription channels	15.5%	15.9%	15.5%	16.9%	16.1%	18.5%		16.2%	14.5%

== See also ==
- Audience measurement
- Nielsen Media Research
