= OzTAM =

Australian firm making television ratings

- Industry: Market research
- Founded: 1999; 27 years ago in Australia
- Website: oztam.com.au

OzTAM is an Australian audience measurement research firm that collects and markets television ratings data. It is jointly and equally owned by the Seven Network (Seven Media Group), the Nine Network (Nine Entertainment) and Network 10 (Paramount ANZ), and is the official source of television ratings data for all metropolitan television in Sydney, Melbourne, Brisbane, Adelaide, and Perth, as well as subscription services (such as Foxtel) on a national basis.

OzTAM was created in 1999 after the Seven and Ten Networks led a call for a re-tendering of the contract to provide audience ratings. Executives from both networks were concerned that the previous ratings service did not accurately reflect viewing levels for their channels.

Prior to OzTAM, the dominant metropolitan ratings company was Nielsen Media Research. The two companies competed for a short time, before Nielsen pulled out. Nielsen continues to be active in some regional areas.

There are ten official survey periods, of four weeks each, covering 40 weeks of the year, excluding 2 weeks over Easter and 10 weeks over summer.

In total, OzTAM measures ratings from 3,500 homes, with 950 homes in Sydney, 900 in Melbourne, 650 in Brisbane and 500 each in Adelaide and Perth, with these ratings commonly referred to as 'five city metro ratings'. A further 2,000 homes outside these five cities are measured by Regional TAM, and an additional 1,200 homes monitor viewing of subscription television in Australia. Nielsen are contracted to provide the audience measurement services to both OzTAM and Regional TAM having previously operated their own measurement service.

The Nine Network, traditionally the ratings leader in Australia for many years, carried over its dominance into the OzTam era, winning six consecutive ratings seasons between 2001 and 2006 inclusive. Between 2007 and 2018 inclusive, it dropped to second position behind the Seven Network, before again reclaiming the mantle as the most-watched television network in Australia in 2019.

In 2017, the metropolitan homes measured will increase to 5,250, Regional TAM homes will increase to over 3,000 and subscription viewing homes to 2,120. Additionally, OzTAM's renewed its contract with Nielsen as a sub-contractor through until 2020.

== See also ==
- Television ratings in Australia
