= Richard Reid (entertainment reporter) =

American entertainment reporter

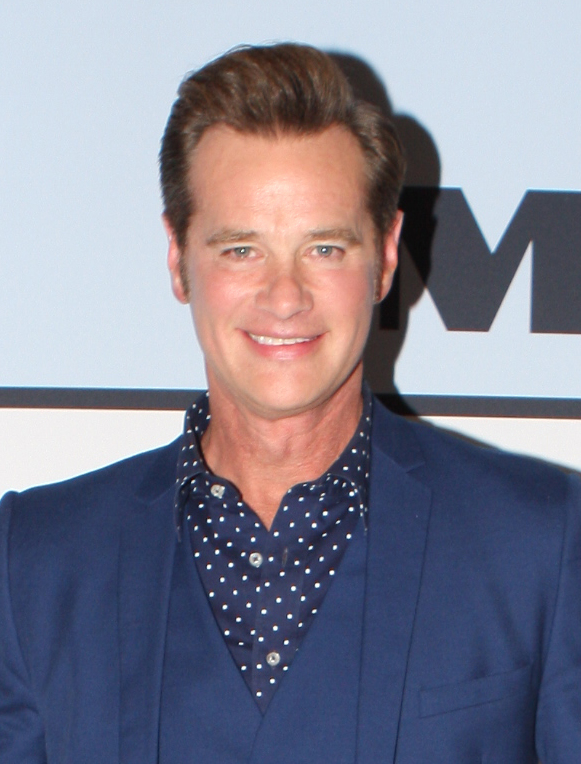
- Reid in 2015
- Occupation: Entertainment reporter
- Years active: 1999–present
- Known for: Today; Studio 10; I’m a Celebrity...Get Me Out of Here!
- Style: Entertainment reporter
- Website: richardreid.com.au

Richard Reid is an Australian-based American entertainment reporter.

He is known for his daily Hollywood gossip segment on the Nine Network's breakfast program Today from 2006 until 2015. During this time, he was also the resident style expert on Nine's makeover show, Domestic Blitz and appeared on other Nine programs such as 20 to One.

== Early life ==
Reid studied at Hunter College in New York City, where he graduated from the College of Arts and Sciences with honours in the film and theatre literature degree.

== Career ==
Hired as an entertainment reporter for Northwest Cable News in Seattle, Washington, Reid caused a stir in 1999 when he became the first openly gay on-air personality in the region. He quickly became known for his hilarious celebrity interviews, insider gossip and his ‘Richard’s Reels’ movie reviews.

In 2004, Reid moved to Hollywood and established a name for himself as a producer, creating daily stories for Access Hollywood, Entertainment Tonight, The Insider and the E! Network. While working on the Paramount Pictures lot, he began doing the occasional gossip cross for the Australian Today Show which immediately caught on with viewers. Soon, that once-a-week segment became a permanent fixture, culminating with four live crosses to Hollywood each and every day. He remained with the show for 8 years.

In 2008, Reid joined forces with Scott Cam and Shelley Craft as a team member on the popular Sunday night reality series Domestic Blitz. The show ran for four series.

From 2009 to 2015, Reid has been an entertainment and Hollywood gossip reporter on radio shows The Kyle and Jackie O Show on Australian station 2Day FM, Morning Crew on Malaysian station Hitz.fm and on the Breakfast show on South African station Jacaranda FM.

Having parted ways with Today in 2015, he would return to the Nine Network in the same year as a cast member on the fourth season of The Celebrity Apprentice Australia. While he appeared on every episode, he was fired in a double elimination on the second to the last episode.

In 2019, Reid returned to the reality show genre, participating in the fifth series of I'm a Celebrity...Get Me Out of Here! in South Africa. He was crowned "King of the Jungle" after winning the series, which had high viewer ratings.

In July 2019, Reid made his Australian stage debut in Bonnie Lythgoe’s spectacular 3D musical production of Jack and Beanstalk at Sydney's historic State Theatre.

Dividing his time between Los Angeles and Sydney, Reid appeared as a contributing panelist on Network Ten's morning show Studio 10.

In February 2020, Reid was featured in First Dates Australia.
