= Reno Rumble season 2 =

Reno Rumble
- Season 2
- No. of episodes: 15

Release
- Original network: Nine Network
- Original release: 21 March – 26 April 2016

Season chronology
- ← Previous; Season 1

Reno Rumble: East v West is the second season of Australian reality television series Reno Rumble, it aired on the Nine Network. Unlike the first season which pit former contestants from The Block against former contestants from House Rules, this season had state based rookie teams from either the East or West side of Australia competing against each other. It was hosted by Scott Cam and Shelley Craft and judged by Colin McAllister and Justin Ryan. It premiered Monday 21 March 2016. The first episode was available online (9Now & Facebook page) one day ahead of its premiere on Sunday 20 March 2016. Homebase is set at Pipemakers Park, Maribyrnong River.

Due to unexpected low ratings, from Monday 4 April only 2 episodes a week aired and was pushed back an hour to 8:30 pm timeslot. The season was won by Lisa & John who received $100,000.

== Format ==
Each week each individual team within
Team West (red) and Team East (blue) are allocated two rooms to deliver at the end of each week. The homeowners give each individual team a brief for their rooms. The whole team (red or blue) with the highest score are the weeks winning team and avoid elimination, the lowest scoring individual team in the losing team will be eliminated.

== Contestants ==
Nine has announced the 6 teams that will compete on Reno Rumble: East v West.

Team West			Team East		
Team	State	Relationship	Team	State	Relationship
Dane & Leanne	SA	Mother & Son	Sarah & Renee	QLD	Best Friends
Steve & Holly	WA	Married	Lisa & John	NSW	Partners
Jim & Hayley	SA	Engaged	Scott & Nadia	VIC	Couple with children

== Elimination history ==
immunity and elimination results
Team	House Renos							
Team	Wk 1	Team Total	Wk 2	Team Total	Wk 3	Team Total	Wk 4	Wk 5 Final Total
Team	Results							
Dane & Leanne	27	91^{[c]}	27	82^{[c]}	47	86	31	Eliminated (Week 4)
Jim & Hayley	24	91^{[c]}	25	82^{[c]}	39	86	Eliminated (Week 3)	
Steve & Holly	25	91^{[c]}	22	82^{[c]}	Eliminated (Week 2)			
Lisa & John	28	88^{[c]}	26	84^{[c]}	35	88	33	89
Scott & Nadia	24	88^{[c]}	21	84^{[c]}	26	88	32	88
Sarah & Renee	23	88^{[c]}	29	84^{[c]}	27	88	29	Eliminated (Week 4)

== Weekly results ==
Elimination Table
Teams	Wk 1	Wk 2	Wk 3	Wk 4	Wk 5
Lisa & John	28	26	35	33	89
Scott & Nadia	24	21	26	32	88
Dane & Leanne	27	27	47	31	Eliminated (Week 4)
Sarah & Renee	23	29	27	29	Eliminated (Week 4)
Jim & Hayley	24	25	39	Eliminated (Week 3)	
Steve & Holly	25	22	Eliminated (Week 2)		

The team was on the winning team
The team had immunity
The team were eliminated
The team won the series
The team came in second place in the series.

== Results ==
=== Week 1 ===
- Episodes 1 to 4.
- Airdate — 21 to 27 March 2016.
- Team West Homeowner — Sarah - she has been fighting a rare cancer, Hodgkin's Lymphoma, for seven years and is now in remission.
- Team East Homeowner — Maddy - she is Sarahs best friend, who helped raise $180,000 for her treatment which has cured Sarahs cancer.
- Description — Each team must deliver two rooms at the end of the week with the lowest scoring individual team on the losing team being eliminated. The team captain on the winning team will receive immunity for week 2. After results were announced, scotty announced there will be no elimination for week 1.

Colour key:
– Immunity
– Eliminated
– Advanced to Grand Final
– Winning Team
– Losing Team

Summary of week one results
Team		Rooms	Scores			Total	Team Total
Team		Rooms	Colin	Justin	Room Total	Total	Team Total
Team West (Sarah's House)
SA	Dane & Leanne (Team Captains)	Guest Bedroom 1	6	6	12	27	91
SA	Dane & Leanne (Team Captains)	Kitchen	8	7	15	27	91
WA	Steve & Holly	Guest Bedroom 2/Study	5	4	9	25	91
WA	Steve & Holly	Bathroom/Laundry	8	8	16	25	91
SA	Jim & Hayley	Master Bedroom	5	5	10	24	91
SA	Jim & Hayley	Living & Dining Room	8	6	14	24	91
Team Space		Front Yard	7	8	15	15	91
Team East (Maddy's House)
QLD	Sarah & Renee	Dining Room	5	4	9	23	88
QLD	Sarah & Renee	Kitchen	7	7	14	23	88
NSW	Lisa & John (Team Captains)	Guest Bedroom	7	7	14	28	88
NSW	Lisa & John (Team Captains)	Living Room	7	7	14	28	88
VIC	Scott & Nadia	Master Bedroom	6	7	13	24	88
VIC	Scott & Nadia	Bathroom/Laundry	5	6	11	24	88
Team Space		Front Yard	6	7	13	13	88

=== Week 2 ===
- Episodes 5 to 7
- Airdate — 28 March to 4 April 2016
- Team West Homeowner — Chris & Kate - They have witnessed the heartache and loss of road trauma firsthand working in emergency services. They are huge supporters and close friends of Christine & David whom they nominated for their home to be renovated on the show
- Team East Homeowner — Christine & David - This married couple have gone through heartbreak losing two daughters (Wendy & Melissa) in a car accident and another (Nicky) due to severe injuries from a car accident. They now care for Nicky's son, Blake, and focus on giving him a great future
- Description — Due to no elimination in week 1, this week will have the first elimination.

Summary of week two results
Team		Rooms	Scores			Total	Team Total
Team		Rooms	Colin	Justin	Room Total	Total	Team Total
Team West (Chris & Kate's House)
SA	Dane & Leanne	Living & Dining Room	6	6	12	27	82
SA	Dane & Leanne	Main Bathroom	7	8	15	27	82
WA	Steve & Holly	Master Bedroom	5	5	10	22	82
WA	Steve & Holly	Ensuite	6	6	12	22	82
SA	Jim & Hayley (Team Captains)	Kid's Room	5	7	12	25	82
SA	Jim & Hayley (Team Captains)	Kitchen	6	7	13	25	82
Team Space		Front Lounge Room	4	4	8	8	82
Team East (Cristine & David's House)
QLD	Sarah & Renee	Master Bedroom	7	7	14	29	84
QLD	Sarah & Renee	Main Bathroon	8	7	15	29	84
NSW	Lisa & John	Dining Room	6	5	11	26	84
NSW	Lisa & John	Kitchen	8	7	15	26	84
VIC	Scott & Nadia (Team Captains)	Kid's Bedroom	6	6	12	21	84
VIC	Scott & Nadia (Team Captains)	Living Room	5	4	9	21	84
Team Space		Games Room/Office	4	4	8	8	84

=== Week 3 ===
- Episodes 8 & 9
- Airdate — 5 to 11 April 2016
- Team West Homeowner — Joy - She is a single mother to daughter Tara and is a support care worker who brings in a modest wage but not enough to cover repairs needed after fire severely damaged her home in 2002
- Team East Homeowner — Peter and Michelle - This couple are parents to three (Matty, Naomi & Tamara) and are selfless members of the community. It was thanks to them that most of the Joy's family belongings were saved during the fire
- Description — Due to losing a team from elimination, the two individual teams in Team Red have to add an extra room to complete each making it three not two rooms

Summary of week three results
Team		Rooms	Scores			Total	Team Total
Team		Rooms	Colin	Justin	Room Total	Total	Team Total
Team West (Joy's House)
SA	Dane & Leanne (Team Captains)	Guest Bedroom	8	8	16	47	86
SA	Dane & Leanne (Team Captains)	Master Bedroom	6	6	12	47	86
SA	Dane & Leanne (Team Captains)	Kitchen	9	10	19	47	86
SA	Jim & Hayley	Tara's Bedroom	6	6	12	39	86
SA	Jim & Hayley	Bathroom	7	8	15	39	86
SA	Jim & Hayley	Living Room	6	6	12	39	86
Team East (Peter & Michelle's House)
QLD	Sarah & Renee (Team Captains)	Naomi & Tamara's Bedroom	6	7	13	27	88
QLD	Sarah & Renee (Team Captains)	Living Room	7	7	14	27	88
NSW	Lisa & John	Master Bedroom	8	8	16	35	88
NSW	Lisa & John	Bathroom	10	9	19	35	88
VIC	Scott & Nadia	Matt's Bedroom	5	5	10	26	88
VIC	Scott & Nadia	Kitchen & Dining Room	8	8	16	26	88

=== Week 4 (Semi-finals Week) ===
- Episodes 10 to 12
- Airdate — 12 to 19 April 2016
- Homeowner — Debbie - she has dedicated the last 30 years to the homeless using her home as a shelter, also distributes two vans full of second-hand goods to the homeless
- Description — Due to being the only Red Team left, Dane & Leanne will join the Blue Team and become one. They will only be renovating one house, there are no team captains & there will be a double elimination

Summary of week four results
Team		Rooms	Scores			Total
Team		Rooms	Colin	Justin	Room Total	Total
Combined Team West/East (Debbie's House)
SA	Dane & Leanne	Study/Office	8	8	16	31
SA	Dane & Leanne	Main Bathroom	8	7	15	31
QLD	Sarah & Renee	Sunroom	7	7	14	29
QLD	Sarah & Renee	Kitchen & Dining	8	7	15	29
NSW	Lisa & John	Guest Bedroom	9	8	17	33
NSW	Lisa & John	Living Room	8	8	16	33
VIC	Scott & Nadia	Master Bedroom	8	7	15	32
VIC	Scott & Nadia	Ensuite	8	9	17	32

=== Week 5 (Grand Final Week) ===
- Episodes 13 to 15
- Airdate — 25 & 26 April 2016
- Homeowner — Sue & Paul, the parents of Tara and Becky who were nominated for the show by the latter before she died from an inherited kidney disease in November 2015
- Description — In The Final Week, redoing first seasons format, the two final teams must present a room within the first 48 hours and deliver the rest of their rooms at the end of the week. The couple who receives the highest score will win the season and receive $100,000

Summary of week five results
Team		Rooms	Scores			Total (out of 100)
Team		Rooms	Colin	Justin	Room Total	Total (out of 100)
Grand Final Teams (Sue & Pauls House)
NSW	Lisa & John	Tara's Bedroom	8	9	17	Winners (89)
NSW	Lisa & John	Hallway	9	10	19	Winners (89)
NSW	Lisa & John	Main Bathroom	8	9	17	Winners (89)
NSW	Lisa & John	Living Room	9	10	19	Winners (89)
NSW	Lisa & John	Dining Room	9	8	17	Winners (89)
VIC	Scott & Nadia	Guest Bedroom	8	8	16	Runners-up (88)
VIC	Scott & Nadia	Laundry	8	9	17	Runners-up (88)
VIC	Scott & Nadia	Breakfast Area	9	9	18	Runners-up (88)
VIC	Scott & Nadia	Ensuite	10	9	19	Runners-up (88)
VIC	Scott & Nadia	Kitchen	10	8	18	Runners-up (88)

== Ratings ==
Colour key:
– Highest rating during the series
– Lowest rating during the series
– An elimination was held in this episode

Week	Episode		Original airdate	Timeslot	Viewers (millions)	Night Rank	Source	Wk Avg (millions)
1^{[b]}	1	"First Houses Begin"	21 March 2016	Monday 7:30 pm	0.395^{[a]}	—N/a^{[a]}^{[d]}		0.402
1^{[b]}	2	"Design & Budget Woes"	22 March 2016	Tuesday 7:30 pm	0.401^{[a]}	—N/a^{[a]}^{[d]}		0.402
1^{[b]}	3	"Leadership Problems"	23 March 2016	Wednesday 7:30 pm	0.381^{[a]}	—N/a^{[a]}^{[d]}		0.402
1^{[b]}	4	"Rooms Revealed And Judging"	27 March 2016	Sunday 8:00 pm	0.430^{[a]}	#9^{[a]}		0.402
2^{[b]}	5	"Second Houses Begin"	28 March 2016	Monday 7:30 pm	0.370^{[a]}	—N/a^{[a]}^{[d]}		0.388
2^{[b]}	6	"Week Two Half-Way Point"	29 March 2016	Tuesday 7:30 pm	0.370^{[a]}	—N/a^{[a]}^{[d]}		0.388
2^{[b]}	7	"House Reveals, Judging & Elimination"	4 April 2016	Monday 9:00 pm	0.424^{[a]}	—N/a^{[a]}^{[d]}		0.388
3	8	"Third Houses Begin"	5 April 2016	Tuesday 8:50 pm	0.352^{[a]}	—N/a^{[a]}^{[d]}		0.386
3	9	"House Reveals, Judging & Elimination"	11 April 2016	Monday 8:30 pm	0.420^{[a]}	—N/a^{[a]}^{[d]}		0.386
4	10	"Two Renos One House - Semi Finals"	12 April 2016	Tuesday 8:40 pm	0.354^{[a]}	—N/a^{[a]}^{[d]}		0.354
4	11	"Semi Final Week Continues"	18 April 2016	Monday 8:50 pm	0.356^{[a]}	—N/a^{[a]}^{[d]}		0.354
4	12	"Whole House Reveal And Judging"	19 April 2016	Tuesday 8:40 pm	0.352^{[a]}	—N/a^{[a]}^{[d]}		0.354
5	13	"Elimination And Demoltion"	25 April 2016	Monday 8:50 pm	0.300^{[a]}	—N/a^{[a]}^{[d]}		0.275
5	14	"Bedroom Judging"	25 April 2016	Monday 9:50 pm	0.300^{[a]}	—N/a^{[a]}^{[d]}		0.275
5	15	"Winners are announced"	26 April 2016	Tuesday 9:00 pm	0.249^{[a]}	—N/a^{[a]}^{[d]}		0.275
Season Average					0.361	< 20		

== Notes ==
- ^{a} Preliminary ratings – viewers and nightly position
- ^{b} Week/episodes aired during Easter non-ratings period
- ^{c} Includes team space points
- ^{d} Episode was below 20 rank
