= Reno Rumble season 1 =

Reno Rumble
- Season 1
- No. of episodes: 27

Release
- Original network: Nine Network
- Original release: 5 May – 22 June 2015

Season chronology
- Next → East v West

Reno Rumble is the first season of Australian reality television series Reno Rumble, it aired on the Nine Network. Season one had former contestants from The Block on the Nine Network against former contestants from House Rules on the Seven Network. It was hosted by Scott Cam and judged by Darren Palmer and Romy Alwill. It premiered on May 5, 2015. The season was won by Ayden and Jess Hogan who received $100,000 with half to charity and a Mazda CX-5.

== Format ==
Each week each individual team within The Redbacks (The Block) and The Bluetongues (House Rules) are allocated two rooms to deliver, first room is delivered within the first 48 hours, the highest scored individual team will receive immunity from elimination. The teams will then work on their second room the rest of the week, the team with the highest score are safe from elimination, the individual team with the lowest score in the losing team are eliminated.

== Contestants ==
Nine has announced the 8 teams from The Block & House Rules who will compete on Reno Rumble.

Redbacks (The Block)		Blue Tongues (House Rules)	
Contestants	Series	Contestants	Series
Josh & Jenna Densten	4 & 6	Carly Shulz & Leighton Brow	1
Kyal & Kara Demmrich	8	Michelle & Steve Ball	1
Michael & Carlene Duffy	9	Nick & Chris Stavropoulos	1
Ayden & Jess Hogan	10	Jemma & Ben Van Ryt	1

== Elimination history ==
immunity and elimination results
Team	House Renos										
Team	Wk 1	Team Total	Wk 2	Team Total	Wk 3	Team Total	Wk 4	Team Total	Wk 5	Team Total	Wk 6 Final Total
Team	Results										
Ayden & Jess	33	128	35½	140^{[b]}	38	113½	50½^{[c]}^{[b]}	102½	38½^{[c]}	113	142
Josh & Jenna	35½	128	38½	140^{[b]}	36	113½	34½	102½	37	113	Eliminated (Week 5)
Kyal & Kara	29	128	33½	140^{[b]}	39½	113½	35½	102½	37½	113	Eliminated (Week 5)
Michael & Carlene	30½	128	Eliminated (Week 1)								
Carly & Leighton	34½	129	36	134	37½	107½	52½^{[b]}	103	37	113½	141½
Ben & Jemma	31½	129	35½	134	35½	107½	32½^{[d]}	103	Eliminated (Week 4)		
Michelle & Steve	33½	129	34	134	34½	107½	Eliminated (Week 3)				
Nick & Chris	29½	129	28½	134	Eliminated (Week 2)						

== Weekly Results ==
Teams	Original team	Week 4 team	Week 5 team	Week 6 team	Elimination result	Record as Team Captain
Ayden & Jess	Red Backs	Blue Tongues		Red Backs	Winners	1
Carly & Leighton	Blue Tongues				Runners-Up	2
Josh & Jenna	Red Backs				Eliminated in week 5	2
Kyal & Kara	Red Backs				Eliminated in week 5	1
Ben & Jemma	Blue Tongues	Red Backs			Eliminated in week 4	1
Michelle & Steve	Blue Tongues				Eliminated in week 3	1
Nick & Chris	Blue Tongues				Eliminated in week 2	0
Michael & Carlene	Red Backs				Eliminated in week 1	0

Elimination table
Teams	Wk 1	Wk 2	Wk 3	Wk 4	Wk 5	Wk 6
Ayden & Jess	33	35½	38	50½^{[c]}	38½ ^{[c]}	142
Carly & Leighton	34½	36	37½	52½	37	141½
Josh & Jenna	35½	38½	36	34½	37	
Kyal & Kara	29	33½	39½	35½	37½	
Ben & Jemma	31½	35½	35½	32½^{[d]}		
Michelle & Steve	33½	34	34½			
Nick & Chris	29½	28½				
Michael & Carlene	30½					

The team was on the losing team.
The team was the winning team
The team had immunity
The team was eliminated.
The team were eliminated as team captains
Series winner
Series runner up

== Results ==
=== Week 1 ===
- Episodes 1 to 5
- Airdate — 5 to 11 May 2015
- Location — Mill Park

The week is split in two, The first 48 hours of renovation is to renovate their first room and the individual team with the highest score will receive immunity from elimination.

The rest of the week is to renovate the second room, the whole team (red or blue) with the highest score are the weeks winning team and avoid elimination, the lowest scoring individual team in the losing team will be eliminated.

Colour key:
– Immunity
– Eliminated
– Eliminated as Team Captains
– Winning Team
– Losing Team

Summary of week one results
Contestants	Rooms	Scores		
Contestants	Rooms	Room	Total	Team
Redbacks (Alex & Angela's House)
Josh & Jenna (Team Captains)	Master bedroom	16½	35½	128
Josh & Jenna (Team Captains)	Living room	19	35½	128
Kyal & Kara	Man cave	19	29	128
Kyal & Kara	Entrance & Dining room	10	29	128
Michael & Carlene	Jaimee's bedroom	16½	30½	128
Michael & Carlene	Bathroom	14	30½	128
Ayden & Jess	Dot's bedroom	18	33	128
Ayden & Jess	Kitchen	15	33	128
Blue Tongues (Lisa's House)
Carly & Leighton (Team Captains)	Hailey's bedroom	17½	34½	129
Carly & Leighton (Team Captains)	Bathroom	17	34½	129
Michelle & Steve	Master bedroom	15½	33½	129
Michelle & Steve	Living room	18	33½	129
Chris & Nick	Michael's bedroom	14	29½	129
Chris & Nick	Kitchen	15½	29½	129
Jemma & Ben	Guest bedroom	14	31½	129
Jemma & Ben	Dining room	17½	31½	129

=== Week 2 ===
- Episodes 6 to 9
- Airdate — 12 to 17 May 2015
- Location — Northcote

The redbacks had to add a team space to be judged for first room to make up points due to the eliminated team.

Summary of week two results
Contestants	Rooms	Scores		
Contestants	Rooms	Room	Total	Team
Redbacks (Kaye's House)
Josh & Jenna	Maggie's Bedroom	18½	38	140
Josh & Jenna	Kitchen & Dining	19½	38	140
Kyal & Kara (Team Captains)	Master Bedroom	17½	33½	140
Kyal & Kara (Team Captains)	Bathroom	16	33½	140
Ayden & Jess	Reggie's Room	16	35½	140
Ayden & Jess	Loungeroom	19½	35½	140
Team Space	Deck	16	33	140
Team Space	Hallway & Laundry	17	33	140
Blue Tongues (Doug & Jess's House)
Carly & Leighton	Charlie's Room	19	36	134
Carly & Leighton	Loungeroom & Dining	17	36	134
Michelle & Steve	Jess's Office/Guest Bedroom	16	34	134
Michelle & Steve	Laundry & Bathroom	18	34	134
Chris & Nick	Man Cave	14	28½	134
Chris & Nick	Bathroom	14½	28½	134
Jemma & Ben (Team Captains)	Master Bedroom	17	35½	134
Jemma & Ben (Team Captains)	Kitchen & Family Room	18½	35½	134

=== Week 3 ===
- Episodes 10 to 13
- Airdate — 18 to 24 May 2015
- Location — Hampton

Summary of week three results
Contestants	Rooms	Scores		
Contestants	Rooms	Room	Total	Team
Redbacks (Cathy's House)
Josh & Jenna	Guest Bedroom	16½	36	113½
Josh & Jenna	Bathroom	19½	36	113½
Kyal & Kara	Maddie's Bedroom	19½	39½	113½
Kyal & Kara	Kitchen & Dining	20	39½	113½
Ayden & Jess (Team Captains)	Master Bedroom	18½	38	113½
Ayden & Jess (Team Captains)	Living Room	19½	38	113½
Blue Tongues (Tara's House)
Carly & Leighton	Master Bedroom	17½	37½	107½
Carly & Leighton	Kitchen & Dining	20	37½	107½
Michelle & Steve (Team Captains)	Matt's Bedroom	16½	34½	107½
Michelle & Steve (Team Captains)	Living Room	18	34½	107½
Jemma & Ben	Guest Bedroom	17	35½	107½
Jemma & Ben	Bathroom	18½	35½	107½

=== Week 4 ===
- Episodes 14 to 16
- Airdate — 25 to 31 May 2015
- Location — Yarraville

This week, a team member from each side were swapped. Ayden and Jess joined bluetongues and Ben and Jemma joined redbacks

Summary of week four results
Contestants	Rooms	Scores		
Contestants	Rooms	Room	Total	Team
Redbacks (Earl & Steph's House)
Josh & Jenna (Team Captains)	Master Bedroom	18	34½	102½
Josh & Jenna (Team Captains)	Kitchen	16½	34½	102½
Kyal & Kara	Henry's Bedroom	17½	35½	102½
Kyal & Kara	Bathroom	18	35½	102½
Jemma & Ben	Victoria's Bedroom	16½	32½	102½
Jemma & Ben	Living & Dining	16½	32½	102½
Blue Tongues (Alice & Simon's House)
Carly & Leighton (Team Captains)	Master Bedroom	15½	52½	103
Carly & Leighton (Team Captains)	Kitchen & Dining	37	52½	103
Ayden & Jess	Guest Bedroom & Study	15	50½	103
Ayden & Jess	Bathroom & Loungeroom	35½	50½	103

=== Week 5 (Semi-Finals Week) ===
- Episodes 17 to 20
- Airdate — 1 to 7 June 2015
- Location — Kingsville

Due to Ben & Jemma's (Bluetongue) elimination, Carly and Leighton, the last bluetongue team, will have Ayden & Jess stay on as a Bluetongue team. There were no team captains as each couple on each team worked as one. This week has a double elimination & no immunity but an extra $10,000 for their reno. First rooms tied scores and both received $5,000 extra.

Summary of week five results
Contestants	Rooms	Scores		
Contestants	Rooms	Room	Total	Team
Redbacks (Belinda's House)
Josh & Jenna	1st Guest Bedroom	19½	37	113
Josh & Jenna	Bathroom & Powder Room	17½	37	113
Kyal & Kara	Master Bedroom	20	39	113
Kyal & Kara	Kitchen & Laundry	19	39	113
Team Space	2nd Guest Bedroom	18½	37	113
Team Space	Living/Dining Room	18½	37	113
Blue Tongues (Naomi & Sean's House)
Carly & Leighton	Darcy's Bedroom	18½	37	113½
Carly & Leighton	Bathroom	18½	37	113½
Ayden & Jess	Master Bedroom	19½	38½	113½
Ayden & Jess	Kitchen & Laundry	19	38½	113½
Team Space	Asher's Bedroom	20	38	113½
Team Space	Living/Dining Room	18	38	113½

=== Week 6 (Grand Final Week) ===
- Episodes 21 to 27
- Airdate — 8 to 22 June 2015
- Location — Seddon

For the second rooms, each team got to receive a helping hand from an eliminated team, bluetongues chose Jemma and Ben and redbacks choose Kyal and Kara.

Summary of week six results
Contestants	Rooms	Scores	
Contestants	Rooms	Room	Total Score
Ayden & Jess (Rob & Nicole's House)
Ayden & Jess	Master Bedroom	19	142
Ayden & Jess	Guest Bedroom	13½	142
Ayden & Jess	Front Yard & Entry	17½	142
Ayden & Jess	Girl's Room	16½	142
Ayden & Jess	Living Room	19	142
Ayden & Jess	Bathroom & Laundry	20	142
Ayden & Jess	Kitchen	18	142
Ayden & Jess	Back Garden	18½	142
Carly & Leighton (Lisa & Tezza's House)
Carly & Leighton	Master Bedroom	17	141½
Carly & Leighton	Guest Bedroom	16½	141½
Carly & Leighton	Front Yard & Entry	18½	141½
Carly & Leighton	Study	15½	141½
Carly & Leighton	Living Room	18	141½
Carly & Leighton	Bathroom & Laundry	17	141½
Carly & Leighton	Kitchen	19½	141½
Carly & Leighton	Back Garden	19½	141½

== Ratings ==
Colour key:
– Highest rating during the series
– Lowest rating during the series
– An elimination was held in this episode
– Finals week

Week		Episode		Original airdate	Timeslot	Viewers (millions)^{[a]}	Nightly rank^{[a]}	Source	Wk Avg. (millions)
1	Mill Park	1	"First Houses Begin"	5 May 2015	Tuesday 7:30 pm	0.873	#8		0.820
1	Mill Park	2	"First Rooms Revealed"	6 May 2015	Wednesday 7:30 pm	0.791	#9		0.820
1	Mill Park	3	"Immunity & Second Rooms Begin"	7 May 2015	Thursday 7:30 pm	0.766	#9		0.820
1	Mill Park	4	"Week One Continues"	10 May 2015	Sunday 7:00 pm	0.823	#6		0.820
1	Mill Park	5	"Second Rooms Revealed"	11 May 2015	Monday 7:30 pm	0.847	#9		0.820
2	Northcote	6	"Second Houses Begin"	12 May 2015	Tuesday 7:30 pm	0.718	#12		0.766
2	Northcote	7	"First Rooms Revealed & Immunity"	13 May 2015	Wednesday 7:30 pm	0.741	#11		0.766
2	Northcote	8	"Second Rooms Begin"	14 May 2015	Thursday 7:30 pm	0.765	#8		0.766
2	Northcote	9	"Second Rooms Revealed"	17 May 2015	Sunday 7:00 pm	0.841	#7		0.766
3	Hampton	10	"Third Houses Begin"	18 May 2015	Monday 7:30 pm	0.797	#12		0.792
3	Hampton	11	"First Rooms Revealed & Immunity"	19 May 2015	Tuesday 7:30 pm	0.828	#10		0.792
3	Hampton	12	"Week Three Continues"	20 May 2015	Wednesday 7:30 pm	0.692	#11		0.792
3	Hampton	13	"Second Rooms Revealed"	24 May 2015	Sunday 7:00 pm	0.851	#7		0.792
4	Yarraville	14	"First Rooms Revealed & Immunity"	25 May 2015	Monday 7:30 pm	0.733	#11		0.761
4	Yarraville	15	"Week Four Continues"	26 May 2015	Tuesday 7:30 pm	0.674	#13		0.761
4	Yarraville	16	"Second Rooms Revealed"	31 May 2015	Sunday 7:00 pm	0.876	#7		0.761
5	Kingsville	17	"Fifth Houses/Semi-Finals Begin"	1 June 2015	Monday 7:30 pm	0.698	#14		0.710
5	Kingsville	18	"First Rooms Revealed & Immunity"	2 June 2015	Tuesday 7:30 pm	0.752	#11		0.710
5	Kingsville	19	"Week Five Continues"	3 June 2015	Wednesday 7:30 pm	0.668	#13		0.710
5	Kingsville	20	"Second Rooms Revealed"	7 June 2015	Sunday 7:00 pm	0.722	#7		0.710
6	Seddon	21	"Sixth Houses & Final Week Begins"	8 June 2015	Monday 7:30 pm	0.773	#13		0.738
6	Seddon	22	"Finals Week Continues"	9 June 2015	Tuesday 7:30 pm	0.667	#15		0.738
6	Seddon	23	"First Rooms Revealed"	14 June 2015	Sunday 7:00 pm	0.896	#5		0.738
6	Seddon	24	"Grand Final Week Front & Back"	15 June 2015	Monday 7:30 pm	0.735	#15		0.738
6	Seddon	25	"Grand Final Week Continues"	16 June 2015	Tuesday 7:30 pm	0.719	#12		0.738
6	Seddon	26	"Grand Final Week Home Stretch"	21 June 2015	Sunday 7:00 pm	0.902	#6		0.738
6	Seddon	27	"Grand Finale/Last Rooms Revealed"	22 June 2015	Monday 7:30 pm	0.982	#9		0.738
6	Seddon	27	"Winner Announced"	22 June 2015	Monday 7:30 pm	1.215	#3		0.738
Season Average						0.765	#10		

== Notes ==
- ^{a} Preliminary ratings – viewers and nightly position.
- ^{b} Includes Team Space points
- ^{c} Redback team were swapped to Bluetongues team
- ^{d} Bluetongue team were swapped to Redbacks team
