= Domestic Blitz =

- Titlecard (with crew and logo)
- Genre: Lifestyle
- Created by: Tim Cobbin; Justin Sturzaker
- Presented by: Scott Cam; Shelley Craft
- Starring: Interior designer; Chontelle Samios; Landscape designer; Joel Hurrey; Family guide; Richard Reid
- Country of origin: Australia
- Original language: English
- No. of seasons: 4
- No. of episodes: 38 + 2 Specials

Production
- Running time: 60 minutes (incl. ads)

Original release
- Network: Nine Network
- Release: 18 May 2008 – 18 April 2010
- Release: 8 July 2012 – 4 August 2013

Related
- Backyard Blitz

Domestic Blitz is an Australian lifestyle and DIY television series that originally aired on the Nine Network from 18 May 2008 to 18 April 2010. The series is based on the format of Backyard Blitz, which had previously aired on the Nine Network, and generally occupied its same former timeslot of Sunday 6:30 to 7:30 pm. Rather than rewarding nominated candidates with solely a garden makeover though, Domestic Blitz introduced the element of house renovations as well. The series exhibits similarities to the American television series Extreme Makeover: Home Edition and the Angry Anderson A Current Affair "challenges" (1994–1998) in that the candidates either come from a disadvantaged background, or include someone with a terminal illness.

The series was hosted by Scott Cam and Shelley Craft, with Cam having previously been the resident builder on Backyard Blitz, and featured a design team of Chontelle Samios (interior) and Joel Hurrey (landscape), as well as Richard Reid as the family guide. There were also occasional celebrity guests, notably singers Michael Bublé, Pink and wrestler Dave Bautista.

Although the regular series ended in 2010, a television special featuring the contestants from The Block 2012 aired on 8 July 2012 on the Nine Network. Cam was joined in hosting the special by former Backyard Blitz host and counterpart Jamie Durie. A second television special featuring the contestants of The Block: Sky High aired on 4 August 2013.

== Series overview ==
Season	Episodes	Originally aired		Viewership			Most Watched Episode	
Season	Episodes	Series premiere	Series finale	Average Viewers (millions)	Average Nightly Rank	Average Weekly Rank	Episode	Viewers (millions)
1	15	18 May 2008	17 November 2008	1.486	#3	—N/a	"Episode 9"	1.680
2	9	4 February 2009	19 April 2009	1.027	#11	—N/a	"Episode 9"	1.292
3	6	9 August 2009	13 September 2009	1.224	#6	—N/a	"Episode 1"	1.339
4	8	28 February 2010	18 April 2010	0.971	#11	#36	"Zwaan's Renovation"	1.187
Specials	2	8 July 2012	4 August 2013	1.502	#2	—N/a	"The Block 2012"	1.646

== Reception ==
=== Ratings ===
The ratings for Domestic Blitz's first series were deemed very strong, with the show winning its 6:30pm Sunday and Monday 7:30pm timeslot every week since the show made its debut. The show's highest ratings to date were recorded on 13 July with 1.68 million people tuning in, making the show the second highest rating show of that night.

=== Series 1 (2008) ===
Series 1 (2008) ratings
Episode	Original airdate	Timeslot (approx.)	Viewers (millions)	Nightly rank	Ref
1	18 May 2008	Sunday 6:30–7:30 pm	1.351	#5	
2	25 May 2008	Sunday 6:30–7:30 pm	1.481	#4	
3	1 June 2008	Sunday 6:30–7:30 pm	1.514	#4	
4	8 June 2008	Sunday 6:30–7:30 pm	1.364	#4	
5	15 June 2008	Sunday 6:30–7:30 pm	1.515	#3	
6	22 June 2008	Sunday 6:30–7:30 pm	1.506	#4	
7	29 June 2008	Sunday 6:30–7:30 pm	1.512	#4	
8	6 July 2008	Sunday 6:30–7:30 pm	1.578	#2	
9	13 July 2008	Sunday 6:30–7:30 pm	1.680	#2	
10	20 July 2008	Sunday 6:30–7:30 pm	1.432	#3	
11	27 July 2008	Sunday 6:30–7:30 pm	1.547	#4	
12	31 August 2008	Sunday 6:30–7:30 pm	1.462	#4	
13	7 September 2008	Sunday 6:30–7:30 pm	1.349	#4	
14	10 November 2008	Monday 7:30–9:00 pm	1.677	#1	
15	17 November 2008	Monday 7:30–8:30 pm	1.324	#4	
Series Average			1.486	#3	-

=== Series 2 (2009) ===
Series 2 (2009) ratings
Episode	Original airdate	Timeslot (approx.)	Viewers (millions)	Nightly rank	Ref
1	4 February 2009	Wednesday 7:30–8:30 pm	0.971	#11	
2	15 February 2009	Sunday 6:30–7:30 pm	0.663*	#14	
3	22 February 2009	Sunday 6:30–7:30 pm	0.998	#11	
4	1 March 2009	Sunday 6:30–7:30 pm	0.925	#14	
5	8 March 2009	Sunday 6:30–7:30 pm	1.013	#11	
6	15 March 2009	Sunday 6:30–7:30 pm	1.172	#9	
7	22 March 2009	Sunday 6:30–7:30 pm	1.084	#11	
8	29 March 2009	Sunday 6:30–7:30 pm	1.126	#10	
9	19 April 2009	Sunday 6:30–7:30 pm	1.292	#6	
Series Average Ratings & Rank – 1.027 / #11

- * Melbourne and Sydney only

=== Series 3 (2009) ===
Series 3 (2009) ratings
Episode	Original airdate	Timeslot (approx.)	Viewers (millions)	Nightly rank	Ref
1	9 August 2009	Sunday 6:30–7:30 pm	1.339	#3	
2	16 August 2009	Sunday 6:30–7:30 pm	1.307	#6	
3	23 August 2009	Sunday 6:30–7:30 pm	1.142	#6	
4	30 August 2009	Sunday 6:30–7:30 pm	1.246	#6	
5	6 September 2009	Sunday 6:30–7:30 pm	1.070	#8	
6	13 September 2009	Sunday 6:30–7:30 pm	1.244	#7	
Series Average Ratings & Rank – 1.224 / #6

=== Series 4 (2010) ===
Series 4 (2010) ratings
Episode		Original airdate	Timeslot (approx.)	Viewers (millions)	Nightly rank	Weekly rank	Ref
1	"Hilarie Freeman's Renovation"	28 February 2010	Sunday 6:30–7:30 pm	0.826	#14	#55	
2	"The Brincat's Renovation"	7 March 2010	Sunday 6:30–7:30 pm	0.936	#12	#44	
3	"The Vella's Renovation"	14 March 2010	Sunday 6:30–7:30 pm	0.909	#11	#41	
4	"The Lewis' Renovation"	21 March 2010	Sunday 6:30–7:30 pm	0.953	#11	#39	
5	"The Potter's Renovation"	28 March 2010	Sunday 6:30–7:30 pm	1.085	#8	#19	
6	"Wade's Renovation"	4 April 2010	Sunday 6:30–7:30 pm	0.838	#14	#39	
7	"Zwaan's Renovation"	11 April 2010	Sunday 6:30–7:30 pm	1.187	#9	#21	
8	"Renovation 8"	18 April 2010	Sunday 6:30–7:30 pm	1.034	#14	#35	
Series Average Ratings & Rank – 0.971 / #11 / #36

=== The Block to the Rescue (Specials) ===
The Block to the Rescue (specials) ratings
Episode		Original airdate	Timeslot (approx.)	Viewers (millions)	Nightly rank	Ref
1	"The Block 2012"	8 July 2012	Sunday 6:30–7:30 pm	1.646	#1	
2	"The Block: Sky High"	4 August 2013	Sunday 6:30–7:30 pm	1.359	#4	
Average Ratings & Rank – 1.502 / #2

== See also ==
- List of Australian television series
