= I'm a Celebrity...Get Me Out of Here! (Australian TV series) season 5 =

I'm a Celebrity...Get Me Out of Here!
- Season 5
- Presented by: Chris Brown; Julia Morris
- No. of days: 33
- No. of contestants: 14
- Winner: Richard Reid
- Runner-up: Yvie Jones
- Location: Kruger National Park, South Africa
- Companion show: I'm A Celebrity: Saturday Schoolies
- No. of episodes: 24 (excl. companion show)

Release
- Original network: Network 10
- Original release: 13 January – 17 February 2019

Series chronology
- ← Previous; Season 4 Next → Season 6

The fifth season of I'm a Celebrity...Get Me Out of Here was commissioned by Network 10 on 10 September 2018. It launched on 13 January 2019 and was hosted by Julia Morris and Chris Brown. The series ended after 33 days on 13 February 2019 and a pre-recorded finale, won by Richard Reid, was aired on 17 February 2019.

== Celebrities ==
Celebrity	Known for	Status
Richard Reid	Former Today gossip correspondent	Winner on 13 February 2019
Yvie Jones	Former Gogglebox Australia star	Runner up on 13 February 2019
Shane Crawford	Retired AFL player & television presenter	Third place on 13 February 2019
Luke Jacobz	Actor & television presenter	Eliminated 11th on 12 February 2019
Angie Kent	Former Gogglebox Australia star	Eliminated 10th on 12 February 2019
Justin Lacko	Love Island Australia contestant & model	Eliminated 9th on 11 February 2019
Natasha Exelby	Journalist & news broadcaster	Eliminated 8th on 10 February 2019
Justine Schofield	Former MasterChef Australia contestant & TV chef	Eliminated 7th on 7 February 2019
Tahir Bilgiç	Stand-up comedian & Pizza actor	Eliminated 6th on 6 February 2019
Dermott Brereton	Retired AFL player	Eliminated 5th on 5 February 2019
Katherine Kelly Lang	The Bold and The Beautiful actress	Eliminated 4th on 4 February 2019
Jacqui Lambie	Former politician	Eliminated 3rd on 3 February 2019
Sam Dastyari	Former politician	Eliminated 2nd on 27 January 2019
Ajay Rochester	Former The Biggest Loser presenter	Eliminated 1st on 22 January 2019

=== Celebrity guests ===
Ep	Celebrity	Known for	Reason of visit	Ref
22	Sandra Sully	10 News First Broadcaster	Updated celebrities on world news	

== Results and elimination ==
Indicates that the celebrity received the most votes from the public
Indicates that the celebrity was immune from the vote
Indicates that the celebrity was named as being in the bottom 2 or 3.
Indicates that the celebrity received the fewest votes and was eliminated immediately (no bottom three)

Elimination results per celebrity
Celebrity	Week 1	Week 2		Week 3	Week 4				Week 5			Grand Finale	Number of Trials
Celebrity	Week 1	Day 11	Day 16	Week 3	Day 24	Day 25	Day 26	Day 27	Day 30	Day 31	Day 32	Grand Finale	Number of Trials
Richard	—N/a	Safe	Safe	Safe	Safe	Safe	Safe	Safe	Safe	Bottom three	Bottom three	Winner (Day 33)	11
Yvie	—N/a	Safe	Safe	Safe	Safe	Safe	Bottom three	Safe	Safe	Safe	Safe	Runner-up (Day 33)	7
Shane	Not in Camp	Immune	Safe	Bottom three	Safe	Safe	Safe	Safe	Safe	Bottom three	Safe	Third Place (Day 33)	9
Luke	—N/a	Safe	Safe	Safe	Safe	Safe	Safe	Bottom three	Bottom three	Safe	4th	Eliminated (Day 32)	7
Angie	—N/a	Safe	Safe	Safe	Safe	Safe	Safe	Safe	Bottom three	Safe	5th	Eliminated (Day 32)	5
Justin	—N/a	Safe	Safe	Bottom three	Safe	Bottom three	Bottom three	Bottom three	Safe	6th	Eliminated (Day 31)		13
Natasha	—N/a	Bottom three	Safe	Immune	Bottom three	Bottom three	Safe	Safe	7th	Eliminated (Day 30)			6
Justine	—N/a	Safe	Immune	Safe	Bottom three	Safe	Safe	8th	Eliminated (Day 27)				3
Tahir	—N/a	Safe	Safe	Safe	Safe	Safe	9th	Eliminated (Day 26)					3
Dermott	—N/a	Bottom three	Bottom three	Safe	Safe	10th	Eliminated (Day 25)						2
Katherine	Not in Camp			Immune	11th	Eliminated (Day 24)							2
Jacqui	—N/a	Safe	Bottom three	12th	Eliminated (Day 23)								3
Sam	—N/a	Safe	13th	Eliminated (Day 16)									2
Ajay	—N/a	14th	Eliminated (Day 11)										2
Bottom three	N/A	Ajay, Dermott; Natasha	Dermott, Jacqui, Sam	Jacqui, Justin, Shane	Justine, Katherine, Natasha	Dermott, Justin, Natasha	Justin, Tahir, Yvie	Justin, Justine, Luke	Angie, Luke, Natasha	Justin, Richard, Shane	Angie, Luke, Richard	None	
Eliminated	N/A	Ajay; Fewest votes to save	Sam; Fewest votes to save	Jacqui; Fewest votes to save	Katherine; Fewest votes to save	Dermott; Fewest votes to save	Tahir; Fewest votes to save	Justine; Fewest votes to save	Natasha; Fewest votes to save	Justin; Fewest votes to save	Angie; Fewest votes to save	Shane; Fewest votes to win	
Eliminated	N/A	Ajay; Fewest votes to save	Sam; Fewest votes to save	Jacqui; Fewest votes to save	Katherine; Fewest votes to save	Dermott; Fewest votes to save	Tahir; Fewest votes to save	Justine; Fewest votes to save	Natasha; Fewest votes to save	Justin; Fewest votes to save	Angie; Fewest votes to save	Yvie; Fewest votes to win	
Eliminated	N/A	Ajay; Fewest votes to save	Sam; Fewest votes to save	Jacqui; Fewest votes to save	Katherine; Fewest votes to save	Dermott; Fewest votes to save	Tahir; Fewest votes to save	Justine; Fewest votes to save	Natasha; Fewest votes to save	Justin; Fewest votes to save	Luke; Fewest votes to save	Yvie; Fewest votes to win	
Eliminated	N/A	Ajay; Fewest votes to save	Sam; Fewest votes to save	Jacqui; Fewest votes to save	Katherine; Fewest votes to save	Dermott; Fewest votes to save	Tahir; Fewest votes to save	Justine; Fewest votes to save	Natasha; Fewest votes to save	Justin; Fewest votes to save	Luke; Fewest votes to save	Richard; Most votes to win	

== Tucker trials ==
The contestants take part in daily trials to earn food. These trials aim to test both physical and mental abilities. Success is determined by a team winning the trial, with the winning team getting a large meal to share and the losing team getting small portions of rice and beans. If a participant in the trial says I'm A Celebrity, Get Me Out of Here! in the trial, the other team automatically wins.

The public voted for who they wanted to face the trial
The contestants decided who did which trial
The trial was compulsory and neither the public nor celebrities decided who took part
The contestants were chosen by the evicted celebrities
The voting for the trial was of dual origin - see note for details.

Trial number	Air date	Name of trial	Celebrity participation	Number of stars/Winner(s)	Notes	Source
1	13 January	Snakes and a Plane	Ajay; Dermott; Jacqui; Justin; Justine; Luke; Natasha; Richard; Sam; Tahir	Ajay; Dermott; Justin; Luke; Richard	1	
2	14 January	Flying Helicopters	Ajay; Richard	Richard	None	
3	15 January	A Frost Fight	Angie; Justin	Justin	None	
4	16 January	Breakfast in Bed	Jacqui; Justin; Justine; Natasha	Jacqui; Justin	None	
5	17 January	Basket Fall	Justin; Luke	Luke	None	
6	20 January	The Sunday Slam (1)	Justin; Tahir	Tahir	None	
7	21 January	Tunnel Vision	Justin	13/13 stars	2	
7	21 January	Tunnel Vision	Shane	13/13 stars	2	
8	22 January	Meal of Fortune	Dermott; Justin; Sam; Shane	13/13 stars	None	
9	23 January	Drop n' Pop	Angie; Yvie	1/5 stars	3	
10	24 January	Shocking Shopping	Justin; Luke; Natasha; Richard	8/12 stars	None	
11	27 January	The Sunday Slam (2)	Jacqui; Justin	12/12 stars	4	
12	28 January	Trubble Bath	Justine; Natasha; Richard; Shane	8/11 stars	None	
13	29 January	Escape From The Viper Room	Luke; Yvie	12/12 stars	None	
14	30 January	Groundhog Day	Justin; Shane	12/12 stars	None	
15	31 January	Scrotal Recall	Katherine; Tahir	3/12 stars	None	
16	3 February	The Sunday Slam (3)	Justin; Katherine	12/12 stars	None	
17	4 February	Bogged Down	Richard	11/11 stars	None	
18	5 February	Kindy Surprise	Angie; Luke; Yvie	10/10 stars	None	
19	6 February	Last Gasp	Shane	6/9 stars	None	
20	7 February	Spew Tube	Justin; Natasha; Richard	8/8 stars	None	
21	10 February	The Sunday Slam (Final- 4)	Angie; Justin; Luke; Natasha; Richard; Shane	10/10 stars	5	
22	11 February	Deep Trouble	Luke; Richard	4.5/6 stars	None	
23	12 February	Help From Our Friends	Angie; Luke; Richard; Shane; Yvie	2/5 stars	None	
24	13 February	Friendly Fire	Richard; Shane; Yvie	3/3 stars	6	

Notes

- ^1The celebrities were split into two teams, the red team and the blue team. These teams were chosen by the team leaders, Jacqui Lambie (red) and Richard Reid (blue), with Lambie choosing first as she won in a competition between them. The red and blue teams went head-to-head against each other in the immunity challenge.
- ^2Shane was automatically placed into the trial as an intruder. Justin was voted into the trial by the public. The trial consisted of two identical tunnels filled with rats, gunk and cockroaches, with Justin being in one that is lit and Shane being in a dark one without lights. Justin had to tell Shane how to get the stars which were in different 'puzzles' around the tunnel.
- ^3The tucker trial was sponsored by Origin and Angie & Yvie were not only competing for meals for their camp but also for the camp to be 'powered up'. Angie was suspended in the air above the dam and Yvie had to control her by using a pulley system with a rope. Five helium filled balloons, the final being a 'jackpot balloon', were below the celebrities and Angie had to pop them with a wooden spear by being manoeuvred into place by Yvie and 'dropped' towards the balloons. She had to pop the balloons while being 'dropped' to win the star. The two only popped one balloon, but as it was the 'jackpot balloon' it gave them the opportunity to power the camp, and they were able to use electrical appliances like a pedestal fan, microwaves and a kettle for an hour 'of power'.
- ^4During the Boulder Dash section of the second Sunday Slam, Jacqui bumped her head while the 'boulder' was rolling over her and sustained a large lump to her forehead. As a safety precaution, the next day she visited the hospital for a CT scan and was cleared by the doctors.
- ^5The final Sunday Slam was an 'all in' trial. Yvie was ruled out on medical grounds so instead of running the course she commentated with Chris and Julia. Justin had to do the challenge blindfolded, along with the rest of the celebrities, and had to collect 10 mini action figures of himself along the obstacle course.
- ^6The celebrities were reunited with their family members during this episode as it was their last day in the jungle. The family members were able to participate in the tucker trial with the celebrities with one of more of them manoeuvring a 'loop' through a buzz-wire course where they couldn't touch the wires. If they did, their celebrity would be zapped with electricity from electrodes. The celebrities earned all three 'superstars' which earned them and all of their families and friends dinner, which included chips, meat, bread and vegetables.

=== Star count ===
This star count includes points (where able to be counted) from the first few weeks of camps. In all other aspects, it is a normal star count.

Celebrity	Number of stars earned	Percentage
Ajay Rochester	3/3 stars	100%
Angie Kent	15.5/25 stars	70.45%
Dermott Brereton	3/3 stars	100%
Jacqui Lambie	15/15 stars	100%
Justin Lacko	74.25/77 stars	96.43%
Justine Schofield	7/8 stars	87.5%
Katherine Kelly Lang	13/18 stars	72.2%
Luke Jacobz	28.25/30 stars	94.10%
Natasha Exelby	16.5/23 stars	71.74%
Richard Reid	32.5/35 stars	92.86%
Sam Dastyari	9/9 stars	100%
Shane Crawford	37.5/41 stars	91.46%
Tahir Bilgiç	3/7 stars	42.85%
Yvie Jones	12/17 stars	70.58%

== The Sunday Slam ==
In the fifth season, the Sunday Slam was introduced, in which every Sunday a celebrity would have to complete a large and hilarious obstacle course. These courses were sometimes completed 'head-to-head' against another celebrity who was in another team. If the celebrity completed the course they would win a 'slam' of meals for their celebrities and if they didn't they would go away with very little food or nothing. The new tucker trial was split into two main parts - The Course and The Slammer. The time spend on the gauntlet determined how steep the Slammer would be. The There were a number of challenges in the obstacle course, including a slippery slide, an 'electric forest', a spinning turntable, the twin spinning logs, a 'mole hole', a 'feathering' chamber, and the 'boulder dash'.

== Team captains/camp leader ==
Celebrity			Original Run		No. of Votes for Leader/Captains	No. of days as Blue Team Captain	No. of days as Red Team Captain	No. of days as Camp Leader
	Red Team Captain	Blue Team Captain	First day	Last day	No. of Votes for Leader/Captains	No. of days as Blue Team Captain	No. of days as Red Team Captain	No. of days as Camp Leader
1	Jacqui Lambie	Richard Reid	1	6	Automatic Team Captains on entry	6	6	N/A
2	Richard Reid	Jacqui Lambie	6	8	Automatic (as former captains of their Previous Teams)	3	3	N/A
	Camp Leader	Deputy (assigned by Leader)						
3	Shane Crawford	Justin Lacko	10	22	Automatic Camp Leader on entry	N/A		12
4	Natasha Exelby	Jacqui Lambie (Day 23) Richard Reid (Day 24-30)	23	30	Australia's Vote	N/A		8
5	Richard Reid	N/A	30	33	Richard's choice	N/A		3

== Immunity challenges ==
In Season 5 immunity challenges were introduced for the first time ever. These challenges granted the celebrity who won the challenge with 'uneliminatability' and therefore couldn't voted out of the jungle by the public.

Week	Celebrity
1	N/A
2	Justine Schofield
3	Natasha Exelby
4	N/A
5	N/A

== Celebrity Chest challenges ==
Two or more celebrities are chosen to take part in the "Celebrity Chest" challenge to win luxuries for camp. Each challenge involves completing a task to win a chest to take back to camp. However, to win the luxury item in the chest, the campmates must correctly answer a question. If they fail to answer correctly, the luxury item is forfeited and a joke prize is won. This process is used in 'most' of the Chest Challenges. The luxury item is "donated" by a celebrity from the outside, mostly one who previously competed on a previous season.

The celebrities got the question correct
The celebrities got the question wrong

Episode	Air date	Chest challenge	Celebrity participation	Celebrity prize donor	Prize	Note	Source
8	Tuesday 22 January 2019	Elephant Whispers	Richard & Yvie	Peter Rowsthorn & Fiona O'Loughlin (aka Ron and Brenda)	Marula chocolates	None	
13	Tuesday 29 January 2019	'The Easiest Challenge Ever'	Dermott & Shane	Shannon Noll	Liquid refreshments (gin and tonic)	1	
17	Monday 4 February 2019	'TBC'	Justine & Luke	Danny Green	Chocolate Ice Cream with Waffle Cones	None	

Notes

- ^1Shane and Dermott had to lie about their safari that they took in the jungle as they couldn't tell the other celebrities about their challenge. Instead they made up the story that they had to be 'dung beetles', with Shane being inside a 'dung ball' and Dermott pushing him. They put mud all over themselves to convince the celebrities that they had actually become 'dung beetles'. The celebrities' joke prize for not correctly answering the question was a pillow with Shannon Noll's face on it but as Shane and Dermott had made up the best lie and all of the celebrities believed it they were all given gin and tonic, potato crisps & biltong.

== Secret Missions ==
This is a challenge where celebrities have to take part in something without alerting the other celebrities to what they are doing.

=== Jacqui's Secret Challenge: Junk in Your Trunk ===
In episode 10, Jacqui had to wear pants which had a magnet at the bottom. She had to collect at least five metal objects using only the magnet attached to the pants and make sure that the other celebrities didn't discover her secret.

Jacqui collected a pipe-cleaner from the dishwashing area and some pieces of cutlery as she knew where they were after working with Justine as sous-chef the previous day. The reward for completing the challenge was marshmallows for the whole camp which they could melt over the fire.

=== Yvie's Secret Challenge: Complement Justine ===
In episode 12, Yvie had to secretly get all of the celebrities to complement Justine on anything but her cooking. If they could complete the challenge without Justine realising they would win. The reward for completing the challenge was a selection of salts and spices which they could use to spice up their meals.

=== Natasha and Richard's Secret Challenge: Tim Tam Slam ===
In episode 21, Natasha and Richard were given the challenge to secretly complete a Tim Tam Slam each without their fellow celebrities catching them in the act. While one of them was completing their Tim Tam Slam the other was allowed to distract the rest of the camp. Natasha went first followed by Richard. The two of them were successful hence winning the rest of the camp three packets of Tim Tams.

=== The Camp's Secret Mission: Monkey Business ===
In episode 22, all of the camp mates (except for Justin) were given 'monkey masks' with the goal to wear it as much as possible without Justin finding out or asking what they were doing. The camp mates were successful in their challenge and won a bowl of 'Lillie bananas'.

== Saturday Schoolies ==
In addition to the fifth season of I'm A Celebrity, another show hosted by Scott Tweedie aired on Network 10 on Saturdays at 7 pm called I'm A Celebrity: 'Saturday Schoolies'. This hour-long show involves all of the celebrities currently in the jungle and is described as a 'jungle detention'. Tweedie will give assignments, in the form of 'fun' games, to the celebrities which will push all of the celebrities to their limits. The show will be filmed in camp and the celebrities will be completing their tasks for a 'golden lunchbox', which had a number of school snacks inside including an apple, dried mango, a muesli bar, biscuits, chips, chicken, a cheese & lettuce sandwich as well as juice.

== Ratings ==
I'm a Celebrity...Get Met Out of Here! (season 5) overnight ratings, with metropolitan viewership and nightly position
Week	Episode		Original airdate	Timeslot (approx.)	Viewers (millions)^{[a]}	Nightly rank^{[a]}	Source
1	1	"Opening Night"	13 January 2019	Sunday 7:30 pm	1.098	1	
1	1	"Welcome to the Jungle"	13 January 2019	Sunday 7:30 pm	1.014	2	
1	2	"Episode 2"	14 January 2018	Monday 7:30 pm	0.890	2	
1	3	"Episode 3"	15 January 2018	Tuesday 7:30 pm	0.715	5	
1	4	"Episode 4"	16 January 2018	Wednesday 7:30 pm	0.736	5	
1	5	"Episode 5"	17 January 2018	Thursday 7:30 pm	0.678	5	
1	SPECIAL - 1	"Saturday Schoolies - Episode 1"	19 January 2018	Saturday 7 pm	0.229	16	
2	6	"Episode 6"	20 January 2019	Sunday 7:30 pm	0.710	4	
2	7	"Episode 7"	21 January 2018	Monday 7:30 pm	0.743	6	
2	8	"Episode 8"	22 January 2018	Tuesday 7:30 pm	0.717	7	
2	8	"Episode 8: Eviction"	22 January 2018	Tuesday 7:30 pm	0.793	6	
2	9	"Episode 9"	23 January 2018	Wednesday 7:30 pm	0.712	5	
2	10	"Episode 10"	24 January 2018	Thursday 7:30 pm	0.680	6	
2	SPECIAL - 2	"Saturday Schoolies - Episode 2"	26 January 2018	Saturday 7 pm	0.234	18	
3	11	"Episode 11"	27 January 2019	Sunday 7:30 pm	0.647	7	
3	11	"Episode 11: Eviction"	27 January 2019	Sunday 7:30 pm	0.682	6	
3	12	"Episode 12"	28 January 2019	Monday 7:30 pm	0.676	8	
3	13	"Episode 13"	29 January 2019	Tuesday 7:30 pm	0.605	9	
3	14	"Episode 14"	30 January 2019	Wednesday 7:30 pm	0.569	12	
3	15	"Episode 15"	31 January 2019	Thursday 7:30 pm	0.606	8	
3	SPECIAL - 3	"Saturday Schoolies - Episode 3"	2 February 2019	Saturday 7 pm	0.246	15	
4	16	"Episode 16"	3 February 2019	Sunday 7:30 pm	0.591	9	
4	16	"Episode 16: Eviction"	3 February 2019	Sunday 7:30 pm	0.662	7	
4	17	"Episode 17"	4 February 2019	Monday 7:30 pm	0.565	12	
4	17	"Episode 17: Eviction"	4 February 2019	Monday 7:30 pm	0.520	16	
4	18	"Episode 18"	5 February 2019	Tuesday 7:30 pm	0.545	12	
4	18	"Episode 18: Eviction Night"	5 February 2019	Tuesday 7:30 pm	0.555	11	
4	19	"Episode 19"	6 February 2019	Wednesday 7:30 pm	0.527	11	
4	19	"Episode 19: Eviction Night"	6 February 2019	Wednesday 7:30 pm	0.537	10	
4	20	"Episode 20"	7 February 2019	Thursday 7:30 pm	0.677	8	
4	20	"Episode 20: Eviction Night"	7 February 2019	Thursday 7:30 pm	0.800	4	
4	SPECIAL - 4	“Saturday Schoolies - Episode 4”	9 February 2019	Saturday 7 pm	0.209	20	
5	21	"Episode 21"	10 February 2019	Sunday 7:30 pm	0.544	10	
5	21	"Episode 21: Eviction Night"	10 February 2019	Sunday 7:30 pm	0.625	7	
5	22	“Episode 22”	11 February 2019	Monday 7:30 pm	0.560	13	
5	22	“Episode 22: Eviction Night”	11 February 2019	Monday 7:30 pm	0.566	11	
5	23	“Episode 23”	12 February 2019	Tuesday 7:30 pm	0.536	12	
5	23	“Episode 23: Eviction Night”	12 February 2019	Tuesday 7:30 pm	0.580	10	
6	24	"Finale"	17 February 2019 ^{^{[b]}}	Sunday 7:30 pm	0.684	7	
6	24	"Winner Announced"	17 February 2019 ^{^{[b]}}	Sunday 7:30 pm	0.894	5	

- ^{a} Ratings data is from OzTAM and represents the live and same day average viewership from the 5 largest Australian metropolitan centres (Sydney, Melbourne, Brisbane, Perth and Adelaide).
- ^{b} The Grand Final was aired on 17 February but was filmed on the 13 February and with held to the Sunday for scheduling.
