= Reno Rumble =

- Created by: Julian Cress; David Barbour
- Presented by: Scott Cam; Shelley Craft
- Judges: Darren Palmer; Romy Alwill; Colin McAllister; Justin Ryan
- Country of origin: Australia
- Original language: English
- No. of seasons: 2
- No. of episodes: 42

Production
- Executive producers: Justin Sturzaker; Julian Cress; David Barbour
- Producer: Cavalier Productions
- Production location: Melbourne suburbs
- Running time: 60-90 minutes (including ads)

Original release
- Network: Nine Network
- Release: 5 May 2015 – 26 April 2016

Reno Rumble was an Australian renovation reality television series that aired on the Nine Network. The series was hosted by Scott Cam and Shelley Craft, and judged by Colin McAllister and Justin Ryan. The series first aired on Tuesday 5 May 2015. On 28 October 2015, the series was renewed for a second season and aired on Monday 21 March 2016.

Contestants renovated two suburban houses, with one team eliminated each week. In season 1, the winner received a $100,000 cheque, with half going to the winning couple’s favourite charity, and a new Mazda CX-5; the runner-up received $50,000, with half going to charity. Throughout the length of the competition, the contestants will stay in luxury style caravans provided by Elite Caravans.

Each home will be judged by interior design experts who have been briefed by the home owners on the style they want for their renovation. In season two, the winning couple will again receive $100,000 but half will not go to charity.

Each week, each home will be blind judged (unaware of which team renovated which one – or the rooms assigned to each individual couple) and the team with the lowest score that week will be eliminated from the competition.

The series was cancelled due to unexpected low ratings during the second season.

== Format ==
=== Season 1 ===
Each week each individual team within the red & blue teams are allocated two rooms to deliver, first room is delivered within the first 48 hours, the highest scored individual team will receive immunity from elimination. The teams will then work on their second room the rest of the week, the team with the highest score are safe from elimination, the individual team with the lowest score in the losing team are eliminated.

Every room receives a gift from the homeowners, they must work to the brief/style of this object to be scored highly. Each team are allocated a budget, they must work within this budget.

=== Season 2 ===
Each week, both teams are given $200,000 to renovate their houses with each individual team within the red & blue teams allocated two rooms to deliver at the end of each week. The homeowners give each individual team a brief for their rooms. The whole team (red or blue) with the highest score are the weeks winning team and avoid elimination, the lowest scoring individual team in the losing team will be eliminated.

== Hosts and judges ==
Timeline of hosts, judges and other personnel
Starring	Seasons	
Starring	1	2
Scott Cam	Host	Host
Shelley Craft		Host
Colin McAllister		Judge
Justin Ryan		Judge
Darren Palmer	Judge	
Romy Alwill	Judge	

== Series changes ==
In the first season of Reno Rumble, it pit former contestants from Nine Network series The Block against former contestants from Seven Network series House Rules. Scott Cam hosted the season and was judged by Darren Palmer & Romy Alwill. The winner received $100,000 (half to charity of choice) and a Mazda CX-5.

In the second season, it pit state based rookie teams from the East and West sides of Australia competing against each other. Judges Darren Palmer & Romy Alwill were replaced by Scottish interior decorators Colin McAllister and Justin Ryan and Shelley Craft joined as co-host alongside Scott Cam. Similar to season 1, the winner received $100,000 but half did not go to a charity.

== Series overview ==
Colour key:
– Winner
– Runner-up

Season		Episodes	Originally Aired		Result			
Season		Episodes	Premiere	Finale	Winner	Prize	Runner-up	Prize
1	Reno Rumble	27	5 May 2015	22 June 2015	Ayden & Jess Hogan	$100,000 & Mazda CX-5^{[a]}	Carly Schulz & Leighton Brow	$50,000^{[a]}
2	East v West	15	21 March 2016	26 April 2016	Lisa & John	$100,000	Scott & Nadia	None

Series	Premiere date	Finale date	Number of teams	Competing teams			Host(s)	Judges
One	5 May 2015	22 June 2015	8	TB	Josh & Jenna	Ayden & Jess	Scott Cam	Darren Palmer; Romy Alwill
One	5 May 2015	22 June 2015	8	TB	Michael & Carlene	Kyal & Kara	Scott Cam	Darren Palmer; Romy Alwill
One	5 May 2015	22 June 2015	8	HR	Carly & Leighton	Michelle & Steve	Scott Cam	Darren Palmer; Romy Alwill
One	5 May 2015	22 June 2015	8	HR	Nick & Chris	Ben & Jemma	Scott Cam	Darren Palmer; Romy Alwill
Two	21 March 2016	26 April 2016	6	NSW	Lisa & John		Scott Cam; Shelley Craft	Colin McAllister; Justin Ryan
Two	21 March 2016	26 April 2016	6	QLD	Sarah & Renee		Scott Cam; Shelley Craft	Colin McAllister; Justin Ryan
Two	21 March 2016	26 April 2016	6	VIC	Scott & Nadia		Scott Cam; Shelley Craft	Colin McAllister; Justin Ryan
Two	21 March 2016	26 April 2016	6	WA	Steve & Holly		Scott Cam; Shelley Craft	Colin McAllister; Justin Ryan
Two	21 March 2016	26 April 2016	6	SA	Dane & Leanne	Jim & Hayley	Scott Cam; Shelley Craft	Colin McAllister; Justin Ryan

== Season synopses ==
- – Winning Team
- – Losing Team
- – Eliminated
- – Eliminated as Team Captains

=== Season 1 ===
Season one had former contestants from The Block on the Nine Network against former contestants from House Rules on the Seven Network. It first aired on Tuesday May 5, 2015 and ended on 22 June 2015. The season was won by Ayden & Jess who received $100,000 with half to charity, runners-up Carly & Leighton received $50,000 with half to charity.

Teams	Original team	Elimination result
Ayden & Jess Hogan	Red Backs	Winners
Carly Shulz & Leighton Brow	Blue Tongues	Runners-Up
Josh & Jenna Densten	Red Backs	Eliminated in week 5
Kyal & Kara Demmerich	Red Backs	Eliminated in week 5
Ben & Jemma Van Ryt	Blue Tongues	Eliminated in week 4
Michelle & Steve Ball	Blue Tongues	Eliminated in week 3
Nick & Chris Stavropoulos	Blue Tongues	Eliminated in week 2
Michael & Carlene Duffy	Red Backs	Eliminated in week 1

=== Season 2 ===
On 28 October 2015, the series was renewed for a second season, it aired on Monday, 21 March 2016. The season titled "Reno Rumble: East v West", pit state based rookie teams from The East and West Side of Australia competing against each other. The season has had unexpected low ratings and will likely not be renewed for a third season. The season was won by Lisa & John who received $100,000.

Teams	Original Team	State	Elimination result
Lisa & John	Team East	NSW	Winners
Scott & Nadia	Team East	VIC	Runners-up
Sarah & Renee	Team East	QLD	Eliminated in week 4
Dane & Leanne	Team West	SA	Eliminated in week 4
Jim & Hayley	Team West	SA	Eliminated in week 3
Steve & Holly	Team West	WA	Eliminated in week 2

== Season Ratings ==
Series	Episodes	Premiere			Finale					Average viewers (millions)	Rank	Ref.
Series	Episodes	Date	Premiere Ratings (millions)	Rank	Date	Grand Finale (millions)	Rank	Winner Announced (millions)	Rank	Average viewers (millions)	Rank	Ref.
One	27	5 May 2015	0.873	#8	22 June 2015	0.982	#9	1.215	#3	0.765	#10	
Two	15	21 March 2016	0.395	—N/a	26 April 2016	0.249	—N/a			0.361	< #20	

== Awards and nominations ==
Year	Award	Category	Nominee	Result
2016	Logie Awards	Gold Logie Award for Best Personality on Australian TV	Scott Cam	Nominated

== Broadcasters ==
Country	Network	Current Broadcaster?
New Zealand	TV2	Yes, the series began airing on 5 August 2015

== See also ==
- The Block (Australian TV series)
- House Rules (Australian TV series)

== Notes ==
- ^{a} half of the prize money goes to charity
