= Million Pound Property Experiment =

British television series

Million Pound Property Experiment is a television series which aired on BBC Two in the United Kingdom in 2003–2004 in which designers Colin McAllister and Justin Ryan bought, renovated and re-sold properties for a profit. They gambled with a £100,000 loan from the BBC, with the ultimate goal being a sale of a property for £1 million.

Viewers saw them buy, renovate and sell seven properties across Britain, ranging from £100,000 to £1.25 million. It drew an audience of over four million regular viewers as they attempted to leap up the property ladder in seven rungs. They began by buying a house in Birmingham for £100,000 and traded up after every sale on a nationwide challenge to find the next potential property. After two and a half years and seven TV episodes, they ended with a net profit of £290,000. The programme stars Colin McAllister and Justin Ryan as interior designers and Nigel Leck, a full-time developer who project-managed their refurbishments. At the end of the series, the loan from the BBC was repaid with interest, and the profits were donated to Children in Need.

Colin and Justin's book, The Million Pound Property Experiment, was published in 2003.
