= Colin McAllister and Justin Ryan =

Scottish interior decorators and TV presenters

- Occupations: Interior decorators; television presenters
- Years active: 1986–present

Colin Lewis McAllister and Justin Patrick Ryan are Scottish interior decorators and television presenters. The couple have been romantic partners since 1985 and entered into a civil partnership in 2008.

The pair have hosted and appeared in numerous home improvement television shows in both the United Kingdom and Canada.

== Media career ==
=== 2003–2005 ===
An early television project for Colin and Justin was Million Pound Property Experiment, which first aired on BBC Two in 2003. The series followed them as they renovated and resold properties. Their eventual profit, which was approximately £300,000, was donated to the BBC's Children in Need appeal.

They followed this home renovation show with Trading Up on BBC One, its overseas version Trading Up in the Sun and regular appearances on the daytime programme Housecall. They also began collaborating with the United Kingdom's Channel 5 on several shows, including the countdown series Twenty Ways to Make Money on Your Property, How Not to Decorate and Three Celebs and a Baby, featuring Caprice.

=== 2006–2009 ===
Colin and Justin took over as presenters for the second series of the Channel 5 reality show The Farm. They continued their work with the channel with Colin & Justin's Wedding Belles and Colin and Justin on the Estate.

Colin and Justin's Home Heist, a format similar to their earlier UK series How Not To Decorate, introduced them to Canadian television audiences.

=== 2010–2012 ===
In February 2010, Colin and Justin appeared in the television series Celebrity Coach Trip. In January 2011, Colin and Justin hosted 24 episodes of 60 Minute Makeover on ITV1 after the departure of former host, Terri Dwyer.

=== 2014–present ===
The duo increased their Canadian television appearances with Colin and Justin's Cabin Pressure, which debuted on Cottage Life and OutTV in 2014. They also made regular appearances on CityLine and served as red carpet correspondents for the Toronto International Film Festival on Citytv News.

Colin and Justin have served as judges on shows such as Canada's Game of Homes, Australia's The Block and Reno Rumble.

They have also hosted their home renovation programmes, including Great Canadian Cottages in 2018, Colin and Justin's Great Escapes in 2020, and Colin and Justin's Hotel Hell in 2022.

Their latest show, Small Town Escapes, premiered on HGTV Canada in 2026. The series features the duo showing homeowners who are seeking to escape city living to new properties in rural Nova Scotia.

== Filmography ==
=== Television ===
Year	Work	Role	Channel	Region	Notes
2003	Million Pound Property Experiment	Hosts	BBC Two	United Kingdom	
	Twenty Ways to Make Money on Your Property	Hosts	Channel 5	United Kingdom	
2004	Trading Up	Hosts		United Kingdom	
2004	Trading Up in the Sun	Hosts		United Kingdom	
	Housecall	Experts	BBC One	United Kingdom	
	Housecall in the Country	Experts		United Kingdom	
2004–2006	How Not to Decorate	Hosts	Channel 5	United Kingdom	
	Three Celebs and a Baby	Participants		United Kingdom	
2005	The Farm	Hosts	Channel 5	United Kingdom	Series 2
2006	Colin & Justin's Wedding Belles	Hosts	Channel 5	United Kingdom	
2007	Colin and Justin on the Estate	Hosts	Channel 5	United Kingdom	
2007	Colin and Justin's Home Show	Hosts	UKTV Style	United Kingdom	
2008-2009	Hogmanay Stories	Hosts	STV	United Kingdom	
2009	Colin and Justin's Home Heist	Hosts	HGTV	Canada	Series 2
2009	I'm a Celebrity…Get Me out of Here!	Contestants	ITV1	United Kingdom	Series 9
2009	Ant and Dec Christmas Special	Ugly Sisters	ITV1	United Kingdom	Panto Sketch
2010	Ant & Dec's Saturday Night Takeaway	Guests	ITV1	United Kingdom	2 appearances
2010	Loose Women	Guests	ITV1	United Kingdom	Multiple appearances
2010	Celebrity Coach Trip	Contestants	Channel 4	United Kingdom	Series 1
2010	The Hour	Guests	STV	United Kingdom	Multiple appearances
2010	CityLine	Guests	Citytv	Canada	Multiple appearances
2010	Breakfast Television	Guests	Citytv	Canada	Multiple appearances
2011	60 Minute Makeover	Presenters	ITV1	United Kingdom	24 episodes
2011	Celebrity MasterChef	Contestants	BBC One	United Kingdom	Series 6
2011	City TV News	Red Carpet Correspondents	Citytv	Canada	Annually for Toronto International Film Festival
2012	The Real Hustle	Guests	BBC Three	United Kingdom	
2014	Colin and Justin's Cabin Pressure	Presenters	Cottage LifeOutTV	Canada	3 Seasons
2014	CityLine	Experts	Citytv	Canada	
2015–2016	Game of Homes	Judges	W Network	Canada	Guest Judges Season 1 Full-time Judges Season 2
2015	The Block	Guest Judges	Channel Nine	Australia	Season 11
2015	The Living Room	Guest Hosts	Channel Ten	Australia	1 episode
2016	Reno Rumble	Judges	Channel Nine	Australia	Season 2
2018	Great Canadian Cottages	Presenters	Cottage Life	Canada	
2020	Colin and Justin's Great Escapes	Presenters	BBC Scotland	United Kingdom	
2020	Canada's Drag Race	Guests	Crave BBC Three	Canada United Kingdom	Snatch Game contestants Season 1
2023	Colin and Justin's Hotel Hell	Presenters	Channel 5	United Kingdom	

2024 Cityline, Rogers TV - Colin and Justin served as design and decor experts on the lifestyle television series.

2025 Colin and Justin's Sub Zero Reno - produced by WTFN and Farpoint Films for Paramount+ in Canada and Lifestyle in Australia. The six-part renovation series documented the refurbishment of a property in Haliburton, Ontario, Canada. Colin and Justin have been regular design and lifestyle guest experts on The Good Stuff with Mary Berg, on CTV in Canada throughout 2025.

=== Radio ===
Year	Work	Role	Station	Region	Notes
2008	Colin and Justin's Music Makeover	Presenters	BBC Radio Scotland	United Kingdom	
2011	Colin & Justin's Sunday Show	Presenters	Real Radio	United Kingdom	13 week run during the summer of 2011

== Books ==
Year	Title
2003	The Million Pound Property Experiment
2005	Colin and Justin's How Not To Decorate
2008	Colin and Justin's Home Heist Style Guide – How To Create The Perfect Home
2020	Escapology - Modern Cabins, Cottages and Retreats
