= Big Brother (Australian TV series) season 10 =

Big Brother
- Season 10
- Presented by: Sonia Kruger
- No. of days: 101
- No. of housemates: 20
- Winner: Tim Dormer
- Runners-up: Jade Albany Pietrantonio; Tahan Lew-Fatt
- Companion shows: Big Brother Confidential; Big Brother Late Night Feast; Big Brother Showdown
- No. of episodes: 89

Release
- Original network: Nine Network
- Original release: 29 July – 6 November 2013

Season chronology
- ← Previous; Season 9 Next → Season 11

The tenth season of the Australian reality television series, Big Brother, also known as Big Brother 2013, began on 28 July 2013, with a pre-recorded launch show airing on 29 July 2013 on the Nine Network. On 6 November 2013, after 101 days of competition, Tim Dormer won the competition and the $250,000 prize. It is the second season of the show to air on the network after it picked up the series in 2012, following a four-year absence. Sonia Kruger continued to host the show, with Mike Goldman continuing as narrator.

This season ran during the 2013 Australian Federal Election. As Australia has compulsory voting for elections, the housemates (except Jade, as she was not on the electoral roll) had to vote for this election while in the house. The Houseguest also received campaign messages recorded by each leader from the major political parties.

Nathan Little was the first housemate in the Big Brother franchise worldwide to evict himself and give his spot to another player.

Dormer later won a public vote to compete in the fourth season of Big Brother Canada. After 77 Days, he placed third. Dormer, Drew and Smyth later competed in the fourteenth season of Big Brother Australia as a part of Big Brother Royalty.

== Production ==
=== Development ===
The renewal of Big Brother was predicted before the finale of the previous season due to the success the reboot had in ratings. The renewal was confirmed when it was included in Nine's 2013 programming advertisements from 23 November 2012. Open auditions for the new season took place in April 2013. That year, the capital cities of Darwin and Hobart were not visited, however, Newcastle was. For the first time since moving to Nine, the show accepted video auditions provided the auditionee lived more than 500 km away from the closest audition venue. In mid-July, an announcement on the official Facebook page confirmed that the tenth season of Big Brother Australia would feature more housemates to enter the house than in previous seasons. On 21 July 2013, after the housemates had entered lockdown, it was confirmed that a weekly live games task would take place in the first four weeks of the season; it was known as the 'Saturday Showdown' and was hosted by Shelley Craft, with commentary from Mike Goldman and 2012 housemate Michael Beveridge (although the 'Saturday Showdown' was later revealed on the official website to be a pre-recorded showing of the previous night when the games took place and that no live recording would be done). This was similar to the Friday Night Live games format used in previous seasons. Later that same day, it was revealed that "the biggest twist in Big Brother history" would involve the possibility of a separation within the house, hinted at in cryptic announcements from Big Brother and in advertisements showing sneak peeks of the new season. It was suspected that the twist would somehow affect the running and outcome of the Saturday Showdown. On 25 July 2013, speculations surfaced on whether the eviction shows would be moving to Monday nights due to the returning of Australia's Got Talent. These rumours were later confirmed by Nine before the show began with a pre-recorded launch on 29 July 2013.

On 24 October 2013, it was announced that Big Brother Australia would be returning to New Zealand on TV3, after a seven-year absence following the conclusion of the 2005 series. The series aired on an almost four-month delay, a departure from when the series previously aired on TV2 and Prime less than 24 hours after airing in Australia. The premiere was on 25 November 2013.

== Housemates ==
Twelve housemates entered on Day 0. Two more housemates (Drew and Jade) entered on Day 1 as a fake married couple. On Day 8, Rohan and sisters Katie & Lucy (playing together as one housemate) entered the house. On Day 58, two male intruders, Justynn and Nathan, entered the house. Finally, on Day 64, Madaline and Boog entered as the female intruders.

Name	Age on entry	Hometown	Day entered	Day exited	Result
Timothy "Tim" Dormer	29	Sydney	0	101	Winner
Jade Albany Pietrantonio	22	Ballina	1	101	Runner-up
Tahan Lew-Fatt	24	Darwin / Melbourne	0	101	3rd place
Anthony Drew	24	Victoria	1	99	Evicted
Alexandra "Boog" Roe	23	Melbourne	64	99	Evicted
Ed Lower	26	Adelaide, South Australia / Melbourne	0	94	Evicted
Madaline Cogar	24	Sydney	64	87	Evicted
Mikkayla Mossop	24	Newcastle	0	80	Evicted
Ben Zabel	30	Brisbane	0	73	Evicted
Nathan Little	35	Victoria	58	70	Walked
Katie & Lucy Mercer	22 and 21	Perth	8	66	Evicted
Justynn Harcourt	33	New South Wales	58	61	Evicted
Tully Smyth	25	Sydney	0	57	Evicted
Matthew Filippi	27	Sunshine Coast	0	50	Evicted
Heidi Anderson	29	Newcastle	0	43	Evicted
Caleb Geppert	33	Melbourne	0	36	Evicted
Jasmin Bell	24	Victoria	0	29	Evicted
Xavier Holland	28	Victoria	0	22	Evicted
Rohan Mirchandaney	25	Melbourne	8	22	Evicted
Sharon Smith	41	Victoria	0	15	Evicted

== Halfway and Safe House ==
On Day 0, Big Brother announced that half of the housemates will move to the Safe House or the Halfway House. The Safe House was luxuriously decorated, while the Halfway House expressed simplicity and discomfort. The two houses were separated by a single glass wall. Housemates in either house were forbidden from crossing the divide. Every Tuesday, housemates with the most nomination points that week moved to or stayed in the Halfway House. On Day 24, the two houses made one house, with the divides between them removed.

	Day 0–1	Day 1–8	Day 8–9	Day 9–10	Day 10–16	Day 16–17	Day 17–23	Day 23–24
Ben	Safe House			Safe House		Halfway House		Safe House
Caleb	Halfway House			Safe House		Safe House		Safe House
Drew	Not in house	Safe House		Halfway House		Safe House		Safe House
Ed	Safe House			Safe House		Safe House		Safe House
Heidi	Safe House			Safe House	Halfway House	Safe House		Safe House
Jade	Not in house	Safe House		Halfway House		Safe House		Halfway House
Jasmin	Safe House			Halfway House		Safe House		Halfway House
Katie and Lucy	Not in house		Safe House	Safe House		Safe House		Halfway House
Matthew	Halfway House			Safe House		Safe House	Halfway House	Halfway House
Mikkayla	Halfway House			Halfway House	Safe House	Halfway House	Safe House	Halfway House
Tahan	Halfway House			Safe House		Halfway House		Halfway House
Tim	Safe House			Halfway House		Safe House		Safe House
Tully	Halfway House			Safe House		Halfway House		Safe House
Xavier	Halfway House			Safe House		Halfway House		Evicted
Rohan	Not in house		Safe House	Safe House		Halfway House		Evicted
Sharon	Safe House			Halfway House		Evicted		

=== Halfway House summary ===
- On Day 0, 12 new housemates entered. Upon entry, each housemate had to choose a key. The chosen key would determine whether they would live in the Safe House or the Halfway House.
- On Day 1, latecomers Drew and Jade entered the Safe House but stayed in their Honeymoon Suite for part of their secret task in which they had to fool the other housemates into thinking that they were a married couple.
- On Day 8, latecomers Rohan and Katie & Lucy entered the Safe House but stayed in a separate bedroom. (Previously the Honeymoon Suite)
- On Day 9, housemates nominated for the first time. As Drew and Jade were automatically nominated for eviction, they moved directly to the Halfway House. Mikkayla, Sharon, and Jasmin received the most nomination points, and therefore they also moved to the Halfway House. Heidi and Tim both had 10 nomination points, and therefore it was up to the housemate with the most nomination points, Mikkayla, to decide which of them would move to the Halfway House and who would subsequently face eviction. Mikkayla chose Tim.
- On Day 10, one housemate was asked to answer a question by Big Brother. Tahan volunteered to do so, which meant she had to choose to swap one nominated housemate with someone else. She chose to swap Mikkayla with Heidi; because of this, they swapped sides.
- On Day 16, the new nominated housemates moved into the Halfway House, while the others remained or moved into the Safe House.
- On Day 17, Mikkayla was given the save and replace choice. She chose to save herself and nominate Matthew to take her place, which meant they had to swap sides.
- On Day 23, the new nominated housemates moved into the Halfway House, whilst the others remained or moved into the Safe House.
- On Day 24, the Halfway House and the Safe House joined together and the divide was dismantled.

== Weekly summary ==
Week 1	Entrances	Mikkayla, Xavier, Tahan, Tully, Matthew and Caleb entered the Halfway House on Day 0.; Ben, Tim, Sharon, Ed, Heidi and Jasmin entered the Safe House on Day 0.; Drew and Jade entered the Safe House on Day 1.
Week 1	Punishments	On Day 0 Tahan crossed the divide between the two houses, and had to return her clothes to Big Brother (where they were kept for 24 hours). Since Caleb crossed half the divide, he had to return half of his clothes to Big Brother (where they were also kept for 24 hours). Their suitcases were returned empty. On Day 3, their clothes were returned when Heidi performed her secret task.
Week 1	Tasks	On Day 2, the housemates began their first weekly task: "Find Your Other Half", where they had to find the housemate with whom they would most like to be stranded on a deserted island and learn as much as possible about them. Drew and Jade were paired as a "Married Couple", and Halfway Housemates were allowed to enter the Safe House for the task. On Day 3, the housemates took a quiz about their other half. Later that Day, they completed the task and won a shopping budget of $425 for the week.; On Day 3, Ben and Jasmin had to correctly predict whether certain items would float or sink in water. Although completing the task would have given them luxury ingredients for the week's Family Dinner, they failed and received basic ingredients.; That Day, Heidi received a secret task from Surly: to wear a shirt saying "Nominate me, I dare you", pretending the shirt was her own. After she succeeded, Caleb and Tahan received their clothes back.; On Day 5, the housemates took part in their first Showdown. Matthew, the winner, received $5,000, the first nomination superpower, and a night in the Presidential Suite with Caleb (the housemate he chose).
Week 1	Twists	On Day 0, before the mates entered the house they had to choose one of twelve keys which would determine where they would live; half the keys unlocked the Safe House, and the other half unlocked the Halfway House. Unlike the housemates in the Halfway House, those in the Safe House received luxurious accommodations and privileges.; On Day 1, new housemates Drew and Jade discovered that they must pretend to be married for the first week of the season. If they fooled their fellow housemates for a week, they would be immune from the first eviction; if not, they would face eviction.
Week 2	Entrances	Rohan, Katie and Lucy entered the Safe House on Day 8.
Week 2	Punishments	On Day 9, as punishment for passing food over the divide Tahan had to paint a bucket of coal white.; On Day 10, Rohan received a canned chicken dinner after getting out of the ice bath before the first question was asked during the weekly family-dinner task.
Week 2	Tasks	On Day 9 the housemates began an Ashes Test, their second weekly shopping task. With the garden converted into a cricket pitch, each Safe Housemate took turns to protect their stumps from a bowling machine and the Halfway Housemates were required to keep a fire burning in the garden. That night, Xavier and Tully had to be watchmen and sleep on the pitch. By Day 10, the housemates had lost 19 of a maximum 20 wickets and completed the task.; On Day 9 Ben had to impress Big Brother in an interview to become his personal assistant, and completed the task. Day 10 was his first Day as Big Brother's assistant.; On Day 10, Tahan and Rohan received a Diary Room challenge to win luxury ingredients for the weekly family dinner, and were required to answer questions while sitting in a cold bath. Tahan passed the task, but Rohan got out of the bath within seconds.; On Day 12, the housemates participated in their second Showdown. Ed, the winner, received $5,000, the nomination superpower and a night in the Presidential Suite with Sharon (his choice of housemate).; On Day 15, after the eviction, each contestant had to predict the future of their fellow housemates.
Week 2	Twists	On Day 7, Drew and Jade's secret task was revealed to the other housemates. They failed; only Ben and Matthew believed that they were married, and they were nominated for eviction.; On Day 8, since Katie and Lucy are competing as one housemate Big Brother told them that they have to stay within three metres of each other during their stay in the house.; On Day 9, after the nomination results were announced the nominees were sent to the Halfway House.; On Day 10 Tahan volunteered to answer a question from Big Brother, unaware that he wanted her to save a nominated housemate from eviction (replacing them with someone else). She swapped Mikkayla for Heidi; they changed sides, and Mikkayla no longer faced eviction.
Week 2	Nominations	On Day 7, Drew and Jade were nominated for eviction.; On Day 9, the housemates submitted their first nominations. Mikkayla, Sharon, Jasmin and Tim received the most nominations, joining Drew and Jade as this week's housemates nominated for eviction. The nominated housemates had to move into the Halfway House later that Day.; On Day 10, Heidi was nominated for eviction after Tahan replace Mikkayla with her as the new nominee.
Week 2	Exits	On Day 15, Sharon was the first housemate evicted from the Big Brother House.
Week 3	Entrances	On Day 17 a dog, Mr. Clooney, entered the Big Brother House and Mikkayla became his Chief Carer. Mr. Clooney had access to all of the Big Brother House (including the Safe and Halfway Houses), going from house to house through a doggy door in the fence separating the two houses.
Week 3	Tasks	On Day 16, the housemates began their third weekly shopping task: Big Brother's Ice Cream Shop. To complete the task, the housemates had to deliver accurate ice-cream orders from memory to Big Brother in the time allowed. On Day 17 they failed, with one more than the maximum five errors.; On Day 17 Katie and Lucy received a Diary Room Challenge to play charades, with half or more answers correct winning luxury items. If they failed they would receive only basic items, but they succeeded in the task.; On Day 19, the housemates participated in their third weekly Showdown. Tully, the winner, received $5,000, the nomination superpower and a night in the Presidential Suite with Tahan (her choice).
Week 3	Twists	After the Day-16 nominations, the nominees moved into the Halfway House.; On Day 17 a box appeared on the kitchen table labeled, "Do not touch under any circumstances"; it was then revealed to be a game of pass-the-parcel. The housemates had to play (except Xavier, who was in charge of the music) and Mikkayla, the winner, could swap a person from the Halfway House for another from the Safe House. Mikkayla chose to save herself, replacing herself with Matthew (who became a nominee).
Week 3	Nominations	On Day 16 the housemates nominated, and Ben, Mikkayla, Rohan, Tahan, Tully and Xavier faced eviction this week.
Week 3	Exits	On Day 22, Rohan and Xavier were the second and third housemate evicted from the Big Brother House.
Week 4	Tasks	On Day 23 the housemates began their fourth weekly shopping task, the Yes-No Challenge, in which they had to agree to every task Big Brother asked them to do. If they succeeded, they earned pass balls to use in a lottery which was chosen at the end of the task. On Day 25, the lottery was chosen and the housemates passed.; On Day 24, Drew and Tim played Our Little Secret to obtain luxury items for a seafood platter for the weekly family dinner. At the end of this task the platter was served to the housemates, with (or without) some or all of its original ingredients.; On Day 24, the housemates participated in the fourth weekly Showdown. Jade, the winner, earned the save-and-replace ability and a night in the Presidential Suite with Katie and Lucy (her choice).
Week 4	Twists	On Day 23, after the announcement of nomination results the nominated housemates were sent to the Halfway House.; On Day 24 the Halfway House and Safe Housemates joined to make one house, with all housemates moving to the Safe House, and a new bedroom was unveiled.; On Day 30 the fourth evicted housemate, Jasmin, could give the Nominations Super Power to the housemate of her choice and she gave it to Heidi.
Week 4	Punishments	On Day 23, Tully received her first strike after talking about her Nominations Superpower and discussing nominations.
Week 4	Nominations	On Day 23, the housemates nominated. Jade, Jasmin, Katie and Lucy, Matthew, Mikkayla and Tahan received the most nominations, facing eviction this week.; On Day 24, after winning this week's Showdown, Jade received the save-and-replace ability. She chose to save herself, nominating Ben in her place.
Week 4	Exits	On Day 29, Jasmin became the fourth housemate evicted from the Big Brother House.
Week 5	Tasks	On Day 30 the housemates began their fifth weekly shopping task, the Game Show. To perform the task, they had to receive a high rating from John Burgess. On Day 32 they performed the task, receiving a luxury shopping budget.; On Day 31, the housemates participated in the fifth weekly Showdown. Tim, the winner, received the save-and-replace ability and a night in the Presidential Suite with Drew (his choice).
Week 5	Nominations	On Day 30, the housemates nominated. Caleb, Ed, Jade, Mikkayla, Tahan and Tully received the most nomination points, facing eviction this week.; On Day 31 (after winning this week's Showdown) Tim received the save-and-replace ability, saving Mikkayla and nominating himself in her place.
Week 5	Punishments	On Day 30, Big Brother applied two of Caleb's five nomination points to him after an attempt to influence Katie and Lucy's nominations.
Week 5	Exits	On Day 36, Caleb became the fifth housemate evicted from the Big Brother House.
Week 6	Tasks	On Day 37 the housemates began the Battle of the Bands, their next weekly shopping task. The housemates were split into two teams of boys and girls, ManDate and HotPantz. The housemates then had to learn and perform a song (chosen by Big Brother) which would be posted on the Internet; to perform the task, the housemates had to have more than 50,000 views. On Day 39 they succeeded, and on Day 43 the performer with the highest number of views would perform on the eviction show. HotPantz performed on the fifth eviction night.
Week 6	Nominations	On Day 37, the housemates nominated. Drew, Heidi, Mikkayla, Tahan, Tim, Tully received the most nomination points, facing eviction this week.; On Day 38, after winning that week's Showdown, Mikkayla received the save-and-replace ability. She saved herself, nominating Ben in her place.
Week 6	Exits	On Day 43, Heidi was the sixth housemate evicted from the Big Brother House.
Week 7	Tasks	On Day 44 the housemates began Time is Money, their seventh weekly shopping task. An hourglass and a money booth with $500 were placed in the laundry area of the backyard. During the task, the housemates will complete in time-based challenges to win time for the hourglass. At the end of the task, one housemate will enter the money booth and collect as much money as possible before time runs out. On Day 46 Tully was chosen by Big Brother to enter the money booth for 1:18 minutes, and she collected $430 of the $500.; On Day 45 Ed and Matthew were called to the diary room to Dance for your Dinner, playing for food items for the night's family dinner. They succeeded, receiving luxury food items.
Week 7	Twists	On Day 43 a double eviction was predicted for Day 50, but the housemate with the highest number of save votes would move next door to the Presidential Suite.; On Day 50 Ben moved to the Presidential Suite, where he would stay for 24 hours.
Week 7	Nominations	On Day 44 the housemates nominated Ben, Ed, Jade, Katie and Lucy, Mikkayla and Tahan, with Ed received the most nomination points.; On Day 45, after winning the Showdown Drew received the save-and-replace ability. He saved Jade from eviction, replacing her with Matthew.
Week 7	Exits	On Day 50, Matthew was the seventh housemate evicted from the Big Brother House.
Week 8	Tasks	On Day 51 the housemates began Big Brother's Big Car Wash, their eighth weekly shopping task, where cars (including a Lamborghini Gallardo, a 1961 Cadillac de Ville, a Mitsubishi Pajero and a Ford Model T) would appear in a makeshift car-wash area for them to clean. Ben could choose which housemates received easier jobs. On Day 53 they failed, receiving $5 per person (their basic food budget for the week).; On Day 52, Tully and Mikkayla were summoned to the diary room to win gourmet food items for the night's family dinner. They were quizzed on human anatomy, painting the corresponding body part on the test patient (Ed), and passed the test.
Week 8	Twists	Beginning in week 8, four housemates would be nominated for eviction and the Showdown winner would have a save ability instead of save-and-replace; three housemates would face the public vote.
Week 8	Punishments	On Day 51, Mikkayla received her first strike when she disclosed a comment about the nominations to Katie and Lucy.; On Day 53, Katie and Lucy were ordered to hold hands with each other until further notice for being more than 3 metres apart.
Week 8	Nominations	On Day 51, Jade, Katie and Lucy, Tahan and Tully received the most nominations for eviction.; On Day 52, after winning the Showdown Tim saved Jade from the week's nominations.
Week 8	Exits	On Day 57, Tully was the eighth housemate evicted from the Big Brother House.
Week 9	Entrances	On Day 57, Bert and Patti Newton visited the house as a birthDay surprise for Ben.; On Day 58 it was learned that two male housemates, Justynn and Nathan, would enter the Big Brother house, and on Day 64 it was learned that two female housemates, Madaline and Boog, would enter the house.
Week 9	Tasks	On Day 58 the housemates began LOL, their ninth weekly shopping task. To succeed, they were required to laugh out loud when they heard an LOL sound effect until they heard it again. On Day 60 they succeeded, and received a luxury shopping budget.; On Day 59, Tim and Justynn were called the diary room to see if they would receive gourmet (Asian feast) or basic (prawn crackers) food items for the family dinner. In their task, Mind Reader, Big Brother asked a series of questions and Justynn was required to determine Tim's answers by reading his mind; they failed.; On Day 63 the housemates began Ranking Order, their tenth weekly shopping task, ranking themselves according to Big Brother's questions. They passed, receiving a luxury shopping budget.; On Day 64, Boog and Mikkalya were called to the diary room for Brain Invaders, a late-night family-dessert challenge for chocolate fondue or one M&M each. Mikkayla had to read Boog's mind, answering questions as he had. They passed, winning chocolate fondue for everyone.
Week 9	Twists	On Day 58, it was learned that one housemate would be evicted; to stay, the housemate had to receive the most votes to stay.
Week 9	Nominations	On Day 57, it was learned that there would be no nominations that week; instead, all the housemates except the two new arrivals would face eviction.; On Day 59 after winning the Showdown, Tahan saved herself and Ben.
Week 9	Exits	Justynn and Katie and Lucy were the ninth and tenth housemates evicted from the Big Brother House on Days 64 and 66, respectively.
Week 10	Tasks	On Day 69 the housemates began Rock, Paper, Scissors, their eleventh weekly shopping task. To pass the task the housemates were divided into teams, with no two teams occupying the same part of the Big Brother house. If they are in the same area, the rules of rock-paper-scissors apply. On Day 72 Big Brother told the housemates they failed, and they received staple foods for the next week.; On Day 71 Ben and Madaline were summoned to the diary room for Animal Instinct, the week's family-dinner game, which they played for a mega-barbecue or nothing. Ben put on animal costumes and Madaline, blindfolded, had to guess what animal he was by asking yes-or-no questions; they passed the test for the barbecue.
Week 10	Nominations	On Day 67 Ben, Drew, Ed, Tahan and Tim received the most eviction nominations; this week, there was no save ability.
Week 10	Exits	On Day 70 Nathan left the Big Brother house, giving Madaline (who lost the intruder poll) his housemate status.; On Day 73, Ben was the eleventh housemate evicted from the Big Brother house.
Week 11	Tasks	On Day 76 the housemates began Double B FM, their twelfth weekly shopping task, in which they had to run a radio station with a wide range of shows; any dead air would fail the task. On Day 79, they were told by Kyle and Jackie O that they failed and would receive a basic shopping budget for the week.; On Day 78 the housemates participated in a Family Dinner Auction, a special family-dinner challenge for a gourmet dinner (lamb, chips and ice cream) or a budget meal (Cup-of-Soup). They had to bid for the food with their personal possessions, at prices set by Big Brother, and passed.
Week 11	Nominations	On Day 74 Boog, Mikkayla and Tahan were nominated for eviction, again with no save ability.
Week 11	Exits	On Day 80, Mikkayla was the twelfth housemate evicted from the Big Brother house.
Week 12	Entrances	On Day 85, Tully visited for the Freeze Task.
Week 12	Tasks	On Day 82 Big Brother introduced the Housemate of the Week, entitling the winner access to the luxury refrigerator and hot water and access to the parlour on demand. After the housemates pleaded their cases, Big Brother chose Drew.; On Day 83 the housemates began Freeze and Release, their thirteenth weekly shopping task. They had to freeze in position, not moving until Big Brother said "Release!" On Day 86 they passed, winning a luxury shopping budget for the week.; On Day 85 Tim and Madaline were summoned to the diary room for Kiss the Bride, the week's family-dinner challenge for a gourmet meal (hamburger, chips and beer) or a basic meal (small portions of the gourmet meal). They had to place balls in a box using only their lips, Madaline had to kiss a fish, a crab and an octopus and they had to hold a heart with their lips until they heard a wolf whistle. They passed, winning the gourmet meal and a night in the Presidential Suite.
Week 12	Nominations	On Day 81 Boog, Jade and Madaline were nominated for eviction.
Week 12	Exits	On Day 87, Madaline was the thirteenth housemate evicted.
Week 13	Tasks	On Day 90, the housemates began their weekly shopping task by wrapping presents in Santa's workshop. Ex-housemate Ben gave the presents to children, and told the housemates they passed the task.
Week 13	Nominations	On Day 88 Drew, Ed, Jade and Tim were nominated for eviction.
Week 13	Exits	On Day 94, Ed was the fourteenth housemate evicted.
Week 14	Nominations	On Day 94 Big Brother told the housemates that every vote Australia cast would be to win the series, and the two with the fewest votes would be evicted two Days before the finale.
Week 14	Exits	On Day 99 Boog and Drew were the fifteenth and sixteenth housemates evicted, leaving Jade, Tahan and Tim in the finale.; On Day 100, Mr. Clooney became the mascot for an animal-welfare league and was adopted.; On Day 101, Tim won Big Brother 2013 and $250,000. Jade, the first runner-up, received $10,000 from Ambi Pur. Tahan, was the last housemate evicted, received $5,000 from Ambi Pur.

== Showdown ==
	Winner	Games	House Privileges/Prizes
Week 1	Matthew	Get A Grip; Words With Housemates; Wriggle It; The Tower of Power	Nominations Super Power; 1 Night with the Housemate of their choice in the Presidential Suite (Caleb); $5,000
Week 2	Ed	Twerking; Spelling Beam; Stacked; Down Under	Nominations Super Power; 1 Night with the Housemate of their choice in the Presidential Suite (Sharon); $5,000
Week 3	Tully	The Mini Quiz; The Power of Onesie; Hang in There; Three Bags Full	Nominations Super Power; 1 Night with the Housemate of their choice in the Presidential Suite (Tahan); $5,000
Week 4	Jade	Blind Mans Bluff; Balance Game; Building a Bike	The Save and Replace Ability; 1 Night with the Housemate of their choice in the Presidential Suite (Katie & Lucy)
Week 5	Tim	Bucket Chuck; T.V. Puzzle Picture; Dress for Success	The Save and Replace Ability; 1 Night with the Housemate of their choice in the Presidential Suite (Drew)
Week 6	Mikkayla	Pop Stars (Split into Hot Pantz & ManDate); Putt Up or Shut Up (Girls); Long Distance Darts (Boys); Prop Quiz	The Save and Replace Ability; 1 Night with the Housemate of their choice in the Presidential Suite (Heidi)
Week 7	Drew	Five Against Five; Under Lock and Key; Ice-Cube	The Save and Replace Ability; 1 Night with the Housemate of their choice in the Presidential Suite (Ben)
Week 8	Tim	Kangaroo Quiz; Three Blind Mice; Three Blind Mice: Steeple Chase(tie-breaker); A Painters Pickle	The Save Ability; 1 Night with the Housemate of their choice in the Presidential Suite (Jade)
Week 9	Tahan	Shaken, Not Stirred; Surfs Up; Flippin Flags	The Save Ability x2; 1 Night with the Housemate of their choice in the Presidential Suite (Ed)
Week 10	Mikkayla	Supermarket Sweep; Loveable Twist (two rounds); Giant Jenga	Nominations Super Power; 1 Night with the Housemate of their choice in the Presidential Suite (Boog)
Week 11	Tim	Hammer Throw; The Long Jump; Penalty Shootout	1 Night with the Housemate of their choice in the Presidential Suite (Ed); $5,000

== Nominations Super Power ==
The Nominations Super Power is a weekly twist to nominations. It is a special secret power given to a housemate. The Nominations Super Power gives an advantage to that housemate for nominations in that given week.

	Housemate	Super Power	Used on
Week 2	Matthew	The ability to double a housemate's nomination points without them knowing.	Caleb
Week 3	Ed	The ability to listen to 3 of his fellow housemates' nominations.	Drew, Tim and Xavier
Week 4	Tully	The ability to see the live tally board and 6 nomination points to nominate up to 6 housemates.	Jade, Katie & Lucy and Mikkayla
Week 5	Heidi	The ability to ask Big Brother up to 9 questions about nominations as long as the answer is Yes or No and 6 nomination points to nominate up to 3 housemates.	Jade, Tahan and Tim
Week 6	Matthew	The ability to void 2 Housemates' nominations.	Ben and Drew
Week 7	Drew	The ability to predict the other housemates' nominations. For every name he predicted correctly, he would earn a point to nominate with. He earned 7 out of 18 points and was able to nominate as many housemates as he wanted with those points.	Ben, Ed and Jade
Week 8	Ed	The ability to ask Ben (who had been fake evicted) question about the live tally board and 6 nomination points to nominate up to 3 housemates.	Drew, Jade and Tahan
Week 9	None		
Week 10	Jade	The ability to read three housemates' nominations and shred one of them	Ben, Tahan and Tim (Tim)
Week 11	Mikkayla	The ability to take 2 nominations points from two separate housemates and use those points to nominate with.	Boog and Tahan

== Nominations table ==
Housemates are allowed to distribute five nomination points between their two nominations, with a maximum of four points to be allocated to one housemate. The six housemates with the most nomination points face the public vote. In the event of a tie, the housemate with the most nomination points determines how the tie will be broken. In addition, nominations are held in a sound-proof chamber inside a Nominations Room, as opposed to the Diary Room.

Color key:

Winner
Runner-up
Nomination Super Power winner
Nominated
Exempt
No Nomination
Intruder Vote
Walked
Fake evicted
Evicted

	Week 2	Week 3	Week 4	Week 5	Week 6	Week 7	Week 8	Week 9	Week 10	Week 11	Week 12	Week 13	Week 14			Nomination points received
	Week 2	Week 3	Week 4	Week 5	Week 6	Week 7	Week 8	Week 9	Week 10	Week 11	Week 12	Week 13	Day 99	Finale		Nomination points received
Nominations Super Power	Matthew	Ed	Tully	Heidi	Matthew	Drew	Ed	none	Jade	Mikkayla	none					Nomination points received
Nominated (pre-save and replace)	Drew, Jade, Jasmin, Mikkayla, Sharon, Tim	Ben, Mikkayla, Rohan, Tahan, Tully, Xavier	Jade, Jasmin, Katie & Lucy, Matthew, Mikkayla, Tahan	Caleb, Ed, Jade, Mikkayla, Tahan, Tully	Drew, Heidi, Mikkayla, Tahan, Tim, Tully	Ben, Ed, Jade, Katie & Lucy, Mikkayla, Tahan	Jade, Katie & Lucy, Tahan, Tully	Ben, Drew, Ed, Jade, Katie & Lucy, Mikkayla, Tahan, Tim	none							Nomination points received
Saved	Mikkayla	Mikkayla	Jade	Mikkayla	Mikkayla	Jade	Jade	Tahan; Ben	none							Nomination points received
Tim	1-Mikkayla; 4-Jasmin	2-Xavier; 3-Tully	3-Jasmin; 2-Ed	2-Caleb; 3-Tully	4-Heidi; 1-Ed	4-Ed; 1-Matthew	2-Katie & Lucy; 3-Tully	No nominations	~~3-Ed~~; ~~2-Drew~~	2-Jade; 3-Mikkayla	2-Jade; 3-Boog	2-Ed; 3-Tahan	No nominations	Winner (Day 101)		50
Jade	3-Jasmin; 2-Tahan	3-Ben; 2-Tahan	2-Matthew; 3-Jasmin	2-Tully; 3-Caleb	3-Heidi; 2-Tahan	4-Tahan; 1-Ben	3-Tahan; 2-Tully	No nominations	3-Tahan; 2-Ben	3-Tahan; 2-Boog	4-Tahan; 1-Boog	2-Drew; 3-Boog	No nominations	Runner-up (Day 101)		49
Tahan	1-Ed; 4-Sharon	2-Ben; 3-Katie & Lucy	1-Jade; 4-Katie & Lucy	1-Katie & Lucy; 4-Ed	1-Katie & Lucy; 4-Tim	2-Jade; 3-Katie & Lucy	3-Katie & Lucy; 2-Jade	No nominations	2-Ed; 3-Mikkayla	3-Mikkayla	2-Jade; 3-Madaline	2-Jade; 3-Drew	No nominations	Third place (Day 101)		89
Drew	3-Mikkayla; 2-Heidi	2-Ben; 3-Xavier	3-Tahan; 2-Matthew	3-Heidi; 2-Ed	~~3-Matthew~~; ~~2-Katie & Lucy~~	3-Ed; 2-Jade; 2-Ben	3-Tahan; 2-Katie & Lucy	No nominations	3-Tahan; 2-Ben	3-Ed; 2-Mikkayla	3-Jade; 2-Madaline	2-Tim; 3-Ed	No nominations	Evicted (Day 99)		27
Boog	Not In; House								Exempt	3-Madaline	3-Madaline; 2-Jade	2-Ed; 3-Jade	No nominations	Evicted (Day 99)		22
Ed	3-Mikkayla; 2-Tim	3-Rohan; 2-Mikkayla	3-Mikkayla; 2-Tim	3-Mikkayla; 2-Katie & Lucy	4-Drew; 1-Katie & Lucy	3-Mikkayla; 2-Katie & Lucy	2-Drew; 2-Jade; 2-Tahan	No nominations	4-Drew; 1-Tim	3-Boog; 2-Tim	4-Drew; 1-Boog	2-Drew; 3-Tim	Evicted (Day 94)			39
Madaline	Not In; House								Exempt	3-Boog; 2-Tim	3-Boog; 2-Drew	Evicted (Day 87)				11
Mikkayla	4-Jasmin; 1-Tim	3-Matthew; 2-Xavier	3-Jasmin; 2-Matthew	4-Tully; 1-Ben	3-Tahan; 2-Heidi	3-Ben; 2-Matthew	4-Tully; 1-Tahan	No nominations	3-Tim; 2-Tahan	3-Boog; 2-Tahan; 4-Drew	Evicted (Day 80)					64
Ben	4-Heidi; 1-Tim	3-Tahan; 2-Matthew	3-Ed; 2-Mikkayla	3-Matthew; 2-Caleb	~~3-Ed~~; ~~2-Matthew~~	3-Ed; 2-Tahan	3-Tim; 2-Tahan	No nominations	3-Tim; 2-Ed	Evicted (Day 73)						26
Nathan	Not In; House							No nominations	Exempt	Walked (Day 70)						N/A
Katie & Lucy	Exempt	3-Tahan; 2-Tully	4-Tahan; 1-Jasmin	4-Tahan; 1-Tully	4-Tahan; 1-Heidi	3-Tahan; 2-Ed	3-Tahan; 2-Tully	No nominations	Evicted (Day 66)							28
Justynn	Not In; House							No nominations	Evicted (Day 61)							N/A
Tully	4-Mikkayla; 1-Tim	3-Rohan; 2-Xavier	1-Jade; 2-Katie & Lucy; 3-Mikkayla	3-Jade; 2-Ben	3-Tim; 2-Mikkayla	3-Mikkayla; 2-Katie & Lucy	3-Jade; 2-Mikkayla	Evicted (Day 57)								43
Matthew	3-Mikkayla; 2-Tim	3-Rohan; 2-Mikkayla	3-Mikkayla; 2-Jade	3-Jade; 2-Tully	3-Tully; 2-Mikkayla	4-Tim; 1-Mikkayla	Evicted (Day 50)									19
Heidi	4-Tahan; 1-Caleb	3-Tahan; 2-Xavier	3-Tahan; 2-Ben	2-Tim; 2-Jade; 2-Tahan	3-Tim; 2-Jade	Evicted (Day 43)										23
Caleb	6-Sharon; 4-Heidi	3-Mikkayla; 2-Ben	3-Tim; 2-Jade	3-Tully; 2-Caleb	Evicted (Day 36)											10
Jasmin	3-Tim; 2-Mikkayla	3-Jade; 2-Matthew	3-Jade; 2-Mikkayla	Evicted (Day 29)												21
Xavier	4-Sharon; 1-Mikkayla	3-Tully; 2-Ben	Evicted (Day 22)													11
Rohan	Exempt	1-Tahan; 4-Tully	Evicted (Day 22)													9
Sharon	3-Tahan; 2-Tully	Evicted (Day 15)														14
Notes	1	2	none	3	4	5	6	7	8	9	10	11	12			
Against public vote	Drew, Heidi, Jade, Jasmin, Sharon, Tim	Ben, Matthew, Rohan, Tahan, Tully, Xavier	Ben, Jasmin, Katie & Lucy, Matthew, Mikkayla, Tahan	Caleb, Ed, Jade, Tahan, Tim, Tully	Ben, Drew, Heidi, Tahan, Tim, Tully	Ben, Ed, Katie & Lucy, Matthew, Mikkayla, Tahan	Katie & Lucy, Tahan, Tully	Justynn, Nathan	Boog, Madaline	Boog, Mikkayla, Tahan	Boog, Jade, Madaline	Drew, Ed, Jade, Tim	Boog, Drew, Jade, Tahan, Tim	Jade, Tahan, Tim		
Against public vote	Drew, Heidi, Jade, Jasmin, Sharon, Tim	Ben, Matthew, Rohan, Tahan, Tully, Xavier	Ben, Jasmin, Katie & Lucy, Matthew, Mikkayla, Tahan	Caleb, Ed, Jade, Tahan, Tim, Tully	Ben, Drew, Heidi, Tahan, Tim, Tully	Ben, Ed, Katie & Lucy, Matthew, Mikkayla, Tahan	Katie & Lucy, Tahan, Tully	Drew, Ed, Jade, Katie & Lucy, Mikkayla, Tim	Ben, Drew, Ed, Tahan, Tim	Boog, Mikkayla, Tahan	Boog, Jade, Madaline	Drew, Ed, Jade, Tim	Boog, Drew, Jade, Tahan, Tim	Jade, Tahan, Tim		
Walked	none								Nathan	none						
Evicted	Sharon; 4% to save	Rohan; 6% to save	Jasmin; 6% to save	Caleb; 7.2% to save	Heidi; 8% to save	Matthew; 11.7% to save	Tully; 17% to save	Justynn; 27% to stay	~~Madaline~~; ~~45%~~; ~~to stay~~	Mikkayla; 25.0% to save	Madaline; 11% to save	Ed; 18.6% to save	Boog; 3.8% to win	Tahan; 30% to win	Jade; 34% to win	
Evicted	Sharon; 4% to save	Xavier; 10% to save	Jasmin; 6% to save	Caleb; 7.2% to save	Heidi; 8% to save	Ben; 22.2% to save	Tully; 17% to save	Katie & Lucy; 12.3% to save	Ben; 16.2% to save	Mikkayla; 25.0% to save	Madaline; 11% to save	Ed; 18.6% to save	Drew; 14.1% to win	Tim; 36% to win		

=== Notes ===
- ^Note 1: Drew and Jade failed their secret fake marriage and were automatically nominated for eviction, but still voted in nominations. As Katie & Lucy and Rohan were new housemates, they were exempt from nominations. Heidi and Tim were both on 10 points following nominations, and therefore the housemate with the most nomination points, Mikkayla, had to choose who she wanted in the Halfway House. She chose Tim.
- ^Note 2: As there was a tie on 7 points between Matthew and Mikkayla, it was down to the housemate or housemates with the most nomination points to decide which of them would face eviction. Tahan and Tully chose Mikkayla. A double eviction took place on Day 22.
- ^Note 3: Caleb, as punishment for discussing nominations, was only allowed to nominate with 3 points as 2 were automatically given to him. Caleb was initially told he would nominate two housemates with his remaining points, but was allowed to allocate them all to a single housemate upon his request. As it was a 5-way tie on 3 points, it was up to Tully, the housemate with the most points, to decide who would take the last place and who would therefore be nominated; she chose Mikkayla.
- ^Note 4: In Week 6, Big Brother asked housemates to strategically nominate. All housemates had to nominate in the Diary Room, writing their nominations on paper and putting them in a ballot box.
- ^Note 5: As there was a tie on 4 points between Jade and Tim, it was down to Ed, the housemate with the most nomination points, to decide which of them would face eviction. He chose Jade. This week there was a 'fake' double eviction. The person with the lowest votes to save would be evicted and the housemate with the highest votes to save would be moved to the Presidential Suite; this housemate was Ben.
- ^Note 6: Assuming Ben had been evicted, the housemates could not nominate him, however Ben could still secretly nominate from the Presidential Suite.
- ^Note 7: There were no nominations in Week 9. Instead, all housemates were all automatically nominated for the eviction on Day 66. The winner of this week's Showdown gained the ability to save themselves and one other housemate of their choice from eviction. New housemates Justynn and Nathan were not nominated for this eviction. Instead, they faced a special intruder eviction on Day 64.
- ^Note 8: In Week 10, all housemates had to nominate in the Diary Room. To nominate, they filled out their nominations on the back of a picture of themselves, sealing them in an envelope and then putting them into a filing cabinet where they originally retrieved their envelope from. New Intruders Madaline and Boog were supposed to face an Intruder eviction on Day 71, but as Nathan voluntary left the Big Brother House, this eviction was cancelled, and both Boog and Madaline (the intended evictee) were saved from eviction.
- ^Note 9: In Week 11, housemates nominated in the Diary Room. They nominated on a piece of blank paper then folded them and placed them into a small ballet box; the purpose of this was to help with this week's Nominations Super Power.
- ^Note 10: In Week 12, nominations took place face to face, after they had already written their nominations on paper – as they had done for the past three weeks – and explained them to Big Brother. The housemates then repeated their reasoning in front of the other Housemates.
- ^Note 11: In Week 13, housemates watched one of their family or friends in the chamber nominating with 2 of their 5 points, leaving the housemates with only 3 points to nominate one other housemate with. The eviction percentages were not revealed this week, due to the close proximity of the finale.
- ^Note 12: There were no nominations in the final week. Instead, the public were voting to win rather than to save. The lines froze on Day 99 and the two housemates with the lowest votes were evicted, leaving three housemates in the final.

== Mid-season changes ==
=== Week 4 changes ===
In response to declining ratings and viewer complaints, several changes were made during the fourth week of the season. The second eviction, originally planned to be a single eviction, became a double eviction necessitated by the cancellation of the Halfway House concept on the Wednesday.

The Saturday Showdown also moved from its Saturday timeslot a week earlier than originally planned. Showdown was intended to air on a Saturday for the first four weeks, up until 24 August 2013, before moving to Thursday due to the NRL finals airing from the following weekend. Showdown was no longer hosted by Shelley Craft, and Michael Beveridge no longer provided commentary as the games were now shown in sequence during the daily show depicting Wednesday's events – with Mike Goldman, the sole survivor of the revamp, who provided the narration as per normal.

==== Late Night Feast ====
At the same time, it was also announced that beginning on 27 August 2013, Nine would air a new show titled Late Night Feast at 9:30PM once a week. Each episode depicted the events that took place during a party thrown by Big Brother days earlier on Friday night. Each party was themed – with the first being Las Vegas and Hawaiian the following week – and followed a loose structure. While the housemates sat at a table eating food and drink provided by Big Brother, they discussed topics aimed more towards adult viewing – including religion, sexuality and politics – and then proceeded to play party games and were then given music to dance to.

Unlike other adult-orientated shows that had previously aired on Ten – UpLate, Uncut and Adults Only – the show was not hosted, nor did Mike Goldman provide any narration – instead footage of housemates in the diary room on the Saturday, discussing the previous night's events, was shown to link the various segments together.

At the end of the eviction show on 23 September 2013, Sonia Kruger announced that the final Late Night Feast would air the following night. However the weekly event continued to take place in the house, with little to no footage making it into the daily show.

=== Week 10 schedule changes ===
On 6 September 2013, Dreamworld emailed people who had already purchased tickets for the 30 September 2013 eviction with the information that the eviction date had been changed to 2 October 2013 as a result of "scheduling changes" and that all evictions from that date would occur on a Wednesday. Despite initial speculation that this was due to increased airtime for Australia's Got Talent, it was later confirmed that a 90-minute show would continue to air on a Monday – indicating the change was a result of Nine wanting to move eviction shows so they no longer aired against The X Factor.

The show that was originally intended to be an eviction on 30 September 2013 was used as an intruder eviction and also added two new female intruders to the house.

As a result of these changes, the entire schedule for the show was re-worked and came into effect from 1 October 2013. Nominations moved from Tuesday to Thursday and were cut down to 60 minutes. Big Brother Confidential moved from Wednesday to Thursday airing immediately after nominations and the Monday and Tuesday shows became daily shows, with Monday covering the three previous days in the house. Showdown took place on Mondays, and was incorporated into Tuesday's daily show.

=== Week 11 schedule changes ===
Beginning in the eleventh week, the Tuesday daily show had its length reduced to 60 minutes − the Tuesday timeslot, which up until the week prior was used for nominations, had run for 90 minutes since the series began.

=== Confidential's cancellation ===
Starting in the twelfth week, Nine removed Confidential from the schedule after it followed the nominations show on a Thursday for just two weeks. As a result, Thursday's broadcast was trimmed to 60 minutes, down 30 minutes from the length it was at the beginning of the series.

Ultimately this proved to be a cancellation of the entire Confidential format, as unlike its early end the previous year, it did not return for the subsequent series.

=== Extension ===
Originally planned to end on 23 October 2013, rumours began circulating in late September 2013 that the series had been extended by two weeks. This was fuelled by the previous year's winner, Benjamin Norris, mentioning an extension in a blog post on 17 September 2013 that covered that week's fake double eviction. It was also further fuelled by the date of the finale being removed from the terms and conditions of the KFC Say It with Chicken competition that would see two tickets to the finale being given away. On 26 September 2013, tickets appeared on the Dreamworld website to an Eviction show that would take place on the original finale date, thus confirming that the series had been extended in some capacity.

On 21 October 2013, the new date for the finale was revealed; the series would end on 6 November 2013.

The extension allowed a total of four intruders to enter the house as, for the first time in the series history, there were no plans to include them in the original plan for this series.

== Ratings ==
	Viewers (millions) 5-City Metro														
	Week 1	Week 2	Week 3	Week 4	Week 5	Week 6	Week 7	Week 8	Week 9	Week 10	Week 11	Week 12	Week 13	Week 14	Week 15
Monday	**1.37**	**0.98**	**1.00**	**0.94**	**0.92**	**0.96**	**0.89**	**1.05**	**0.98**	**1.01**	**1.01**	**0.91**	**0.97**	**0.91**	**1.04**
Tuesday	**1.11**	**0.92**	**0.94**	**0.91**	**0.88**	**0.84**	**0.91**	**1.01**	**0.97**	**0.86**	**0.91**	**0.91**	**0.91**	**0.97**	**0.92**
Wednesday	**1.10**	**0.83**	**0.95**	**0.84**	**0.79**	**0.87**	**0.86**	**0.88**	**0.87**	**0.87**	**0.87**	**0.89**	**0.92**	**0.89**	**1.19**
Wednesday	**1.10**	**0.83**	**0.95**	**0.84**	**0.79**	**0.87**	**0.86**	**0.88**	**0.87**	**0.87**	**0.87**	**0.89**	**0.92**	**0.89**	**1.33**
Wednesday	**1.10**	**0.83**	**0.95**	**0.84**	**0.79**	**0.87**	**0.86**	**0.88**	**0.87**	**0.87**	**0.87**	**0.89**	**0.92**	**0.89**	**1.58**
Thursday	**1.04**	**0.88**	**0.97**	**0.91**	**0.80**	**0.84**	**0.86**	**0.88**	**0.89**	**0.78**	**0.86**	**0.87**	**0.89**	**0.86**	
Friday	**0.80**	**0.77**	**0.78**	**0.75**	**0.67**	**0.74**	**0.71**	**0.71**	**0.72**	**0.69**	**0.64**	**0.67**	**0.70**	**0.68**	
Saturday	**0.71**	**0.56**	**0.63**												
Weekly average	1.02	0.82	0.88	0.87	0.81	0.85	0.85	0.91	0.89	0.84	0.86	0.85	0.88	0.86	1.21
Running average	1.02	0.92	0.91	0.90	0.88	0.88	0.87	0.88	0.88	0.87	0.87	0.87	0.87	0.87	0.89
Series average	0.89m														

Ratings are rounded to the nearest ten thousand. Figures in bold include consolidated viewing figures.

== Special episodes ==
A number of special episodes aired during the original run of the season. These included:

=== Live Special ===
On Day 2, Sonia Kruger hosted a special live show that saw the second part of the season's twist revealed as Drew and Jade entered the Safe House pretending to be a married couple. They were tasked with trying to fool the others with this prospect for the whole of the first week. If they were successful, they would earn immunity from the first weekly eviction; if they were found out, they would both automatically face eviction.

=== The Latecomers ===
On Day 8, Sonia Kruger hosted a special live show that saw new housemates Rohan and Katie & Lucy enter the house and Drew and Jade's failure of their secret task revealed to the housemates.

=== The Male Intruders ===
On Day 58, Sonia Kruger hosted a special live show that saw two intruders enter the house, Nathan and Justynn..

=== The Female Intruders ===
On Day 64, Sonia Kruger hosted a special live show that saw two female intruders enter the Big Brother house. The first was Boog, a 23-year-old personal trainer from Melbourne, and, the other, Madaline, a 24-year-old lawyer from Sydney.

=== Trick or Treat ===
On Day 95, Sonia Kruger hosted a special live Halloween show that saw the remaining five housemates, Boog, Drew, Jade, Tahan and Tim to view 'trick' and 'treat' packages. The 'trick' packages contained negative parts of each housemates time including being talked about by other housemates, nominations, etc. The 'treat' packaged contained positive parts of each housemates time along with some messages from family and friends.
