= Shelley Craft =

Australian television personality

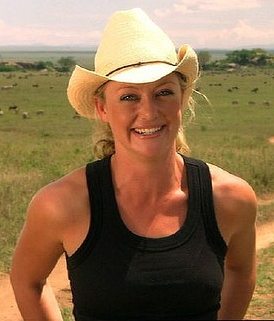
- Craft working for The Great Outdoors in the Serengeti, Tanzania in 2006
- Born: Shelley Craft; 21 June 1976 (age 50); Brisbane, Queensland, Australia
- Occupations: Television personality, host
- Years active: 1993−present
- Employer: Nine Network
- Television: The Block; Australia's Funniest Home Videos
- Spouse: Christian Sergiacomi (m. 2009)
- Children: 2

Shelley Craft (born 21 June 1976) is an Australian television personality.

She is most well known for her long-running presenting roles on the Seven Network programs Saturday Disney from 1996 until 2002, and The Great Outdoors from 2002 until 2007.

From 2008 to present she has been working for the Nine Network on a number of programs, most notably as host of Australia's Funniest Home Video Show, Domestic Blitz, The Block, Reno Rumble and Your Domain.

In 2013, she presented the 'Saturday Showdown' edition of Big Brother Australia. Craft is an ambassador for online travel agency TripADeal.

== Television career ==
=== Seven Network ===
Craft began her television career in the early 1990s with a work experience stint at Channel Seven in Brisbane. This led to a job offer as a production assistant on a local program, and a few months later a co-host role with children's program Saturday Disney.

Craft remained with Saturday Disney as host and segment producer for six years. Craft joined The Great Outdoors as a reporter in late 2001 and therefore chose to leave Saturday Disney in July 2002 whilst returning on occasion up until October 2005. Craft had one final appearance on Saturday Disney through flashbacks during an episode broadcast during September 2009, celebrating 1000 episodes of the program.

As well as presenting stories for The Great Outdoors, she has worked on several of Channel Seven's major sporting events, including the 2000 Summer Olympics in Sydney (as part of the Sunrise team), the 2002 Winter Olympics in Salt Lake City and the 2002, 2003 and 2004 Melbourne Cups.

Along with puppet, Agro, Craft hosted the short-lived revival of dating game show Perfect Match Australia in late 2002. In 2005, she co-hosted Australia's Guinness World Records with Grant Denyer.

After the 2007 season, Craft left The Great Outdoors after a clean-out of the show, with several other presenters also shown the door.

In late 2007, it was reported that Craft could have been a possible replacement for Kate Ritchie as the co-host of It Takes Two, but Craft, apparently miffed at the job offer, quit the network.

=== Nine Network ===
In January 2008, Craft signed with the Nine Network, severing her long links with Seven Network.

Craft took over from Toni Pearen as host of Australia's Funniest Home Video Show from February 2008.

She began as co-host on the lifestyle series, Domestic Blitz, alongside Scott Cam from May 2008.

Later in 2008, Craft did a commercial for National Tree Day, followed by advertisements for Jetstar in late 2009.

In 2011, Craft again presented alongside Scott Cam, this time in the competition series The Block. Craft hosted the Friday night special episodes titled The Block: Unlocked and appeared in numerous regular episodes, presenting challenges to contestants. She has since remained on The Block, presenting challenges and serving as a secondary host to Scott Cam. Craft gained her real estate agent accreditation (NSW) in 2020.

In 2013, she presented the 'Showdown' edition of Big Brother Australia.

In September 2019, Craft was appointed host of Your Domain alongside Chris Kohler.

Since 2023, Craft has hosted Find My Beach House. In 2025, the show was accused by Media Watch of having participants pose as potential buyers of properties they already owned.

== Personal life ==
Craft was married to marketing expert Brett De Billinghurst Craft from 2001 to 2007. She later moved from Brisbane to Melbourne with her then-partner Christian Sergiacomi who is a cameraman for the Nine Network. Craft and Sergiacomi later married at their holiday home in Byron Bay, in November 2009. She also works as a real estate agent in Byron Bay with her husband.

Craft has two daughters born in 2010 and 2012.

== Television roles ==
Year	Title	Role
1996–2002, 2005, 2009	Saturday Disney	Host
2001–2002	The Big Arvo	Recurring Guest
2002	Winter Olympics	Reporter
2002–2007	The Great Outdoors	Reporter/Presenter
2002–2004	Sunrise	Travel Reporter
2002–2007	Melbourne Cup	Reporter
2002	Perfect Match Australia	Host
2003	Wheel of Fortune	Celebrity Contestant
2006	Carols in the Domain	Co-host
2007	Comedy Classics For Comic Relief	Presenter
2008–2014	Australia's Funniest Home Videos	Host
2008–2010	Domestic Blitz	Co-host
2008–2009	Holidaysforsale.tv.	Reporter
2008–2009	The Logie Awards Red Carpet Arrivals	Host
2008	What's Good For You	Presenter
2008	Hole in the Wall	Celebrity Contestant
2009	Weekend Today	Fill-in Presenter (12/04/09)
2009	Money For Jam	Presenter
2011–present	The Block	Presenter
2013	Big Brother Australia 'Saturday Showdown' editions	Presenter
2016	Reno Rumble	Presenter
2019–2020	Your Domain	Presenter
