= Scott Cam =

Australian television presenter

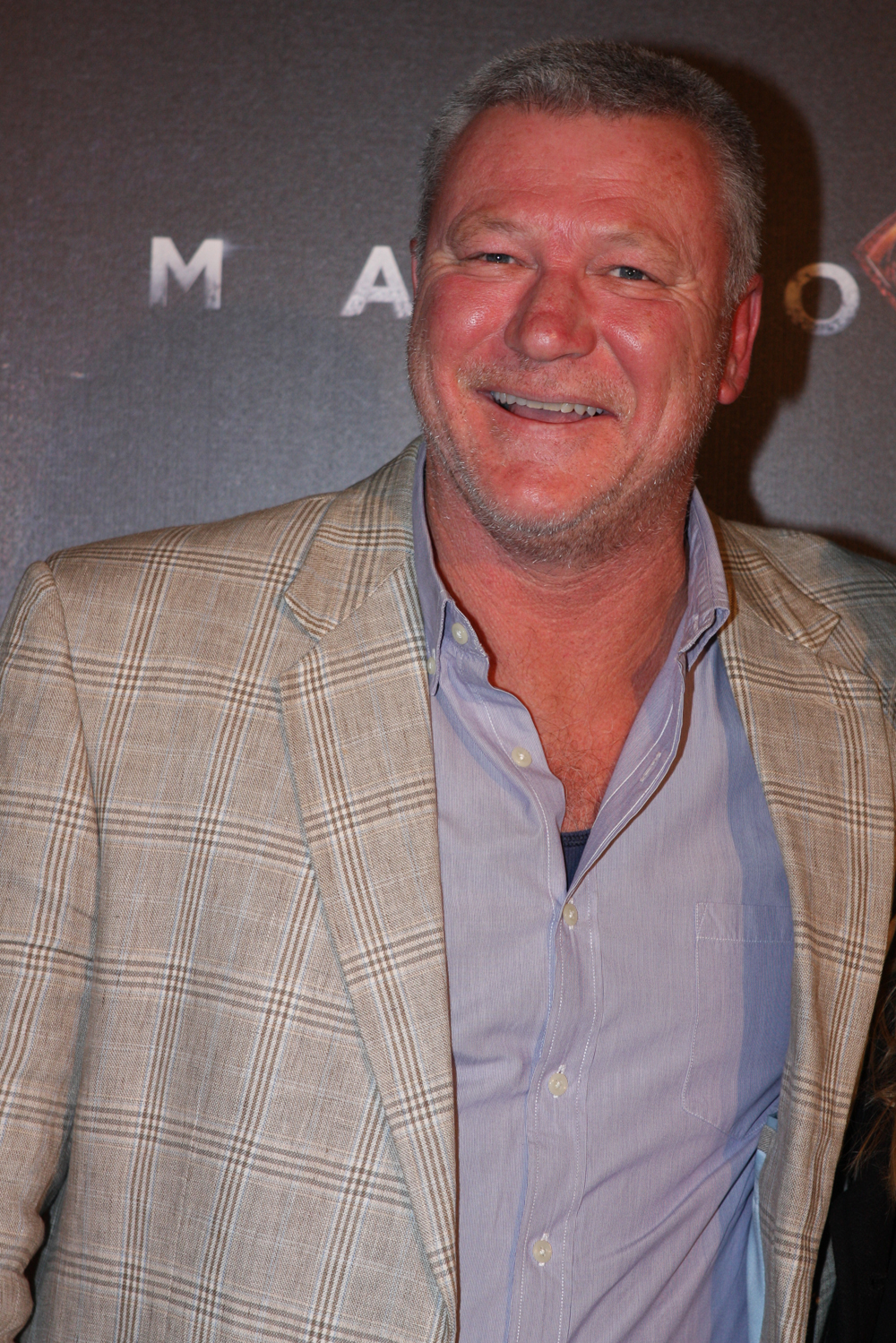
- Scott Cam at the Australian Man of Steel premiere
- Born: Scott Eugene Caminetti; 24 November 1962 (age 63); Sydney, New South Wales, Australia
- Occupation: Television presenter
- Years active: 1999−present
- Employer: Nine Network
- Television: The Block
- Spouse: Ann Cam
- Children: 3

Scott Cam (born 24 November 1962) is an Australian television presenter, a recipient of the Gold Logie appearing on several lifestyle programmes on the Nine Network. He is best known as the host of the hit reality TV renovation show The Block.

== Career ==
Cam first appeared on Nine's popular lifestyle show Backyard Blitz in 2000, alongside Jamie Durie, doing building segments until the show's cancelation in 2006. In between, he appeared on the successful Renovation Rescue (2004–2006) before appearing in his own live lifestyle program Our Place. However, this was cancelled after just five episodes in 2005. From 2008 until 2010, he appeared on Domestic Blitz.

Cam hosted the 2010 series of The Block and has returned as host for every season ever since. He won the Silver Logie for Most Popular Presenter and the Gold Logie for Most Popular Australian TV Personality in 2014 for his work on The Block. Cam also appeared as himself on a send-up of The Block on the comedy program The Joy of Sets in 2011. He also hosted renovating show Reno Rumble which began airing in 2015 through to 2016 over two seasons until its cancellation.

In addition to his television work, he has written two books on building and renovating: Out The Back and the follow-up, Home Maintenance For Knuckleheads. He is also a presenter on the Triple M Saturday morning breakfast show Wrong Side of the Bed.

Cam heavily features as the brand ambassador for Mitre 10 Australia, and has been doing so since 2011.

He was the subject of an episode of the Australian television genealogical program Who Do You Think You Are? which screened on SBS on 30 April 2019.

== Personal life ==
Shortly before the 2026 series of The Block premiered, Cam revealed that he had been in hospital for 12 days for a knee replacement.

== Awards and nominations ==
| Year | Award | Category | Result | Work |
|---|---|---|---|---|
| 2014 | Gold Logie | Most Popular Personality on Australian Television | Won | The Block |
| 2014 | Silver Logie | Most Popular Presenter | Won | The Block |
| 2015 | Gold Logie | Most Popular Personality on Australian Television | Nominated | The Block |
| 2015 | Silver Logie | Most Popular Presenter | Nominated | The Block |
| 2016 | Gold Logie | Most Popular Personality on Australian Television | Nominated | The Block |
| 2016 | Gold Logie | Most Popular Personality on Australian Television | Nominated | Reno Rumble |
| 2023 | Silver Logie | Bert Newton Award for Most Popular Presenter | Nominated | The Block |
