= House Rules season 5 =

House Rules
- Season 5
- No. of episodes: 35

Release
- Original network: Seven Network
- Original release: 30 April – 9 July 2017

Season chronology
- ← Previous; Season 4 Next → Season 6

The fifth season of Australian reality television series House Rules began airing on 30 April 2017. The series is produced by the team who created the Seven reality show My Kitchen Rules and is hosted by Johanna Griggs.

Applications for the fifth season of House Rules were open between 1 June and 30 July 2016 on the House Rules official network seven website. Johanna Griggs announced the series is in pre-production and that she is returning as host for season 5. Season 5 was officially confirmed in October 2016.

This season of House Rules will consist of new teams renovating each other's homes and further challenges for the ultimate prize of $200,000.

== Format Changes ==
New Judges - This season will introduce two new judges, international design stylist, Laurence Llewelyn-Bowen and award-winning Australian architect and builder, Drew Heath, who will both be joining Wendy Moore. Judge of previous seasons, Joe Snell, will not be returning.

Ultimate Prize - The winners of this season will receive the ultimate prize of $200,000, as opposed to all previous seasons where the winners had received a full mortgage payment.

Bonus Room - During the Interior Renovations, one team is given the Bonus Room, which has its own rule but has to be finished in the same duration as the renovation. The team has the decision to keep it or give it to another team. The room is a "pass" or "fail" room only judged by the homeowners, meaning if they like it, the team receives 5 bonus points to their total score, but if they do not, they lose 5 points from the total score.

Grand Final - This will be the first season to not have a Live Grand Final, meaning the team with the highest score from the judges will win unlike previous seasons where the winners are decided by a combination of the judges score and the viewers vote.

== Contestant Teams ==
This season of House Rules introduced six new teams. All teams are from different states in Australia.

Team		Ages	House	Relationship	Status
1	Aaron & Daniella Winter	31 & 38	Gold Coast, QLD	Gold Coast Couple	Winners
2	Kate Whiting & James “Harry” Harris	29 & 32	Adelaide, SA	Teacher & Chippie	Runners-up
3	Andrew & Jono King	27	Mandurah, WA	Geek Twins	Eliminated (Charity Unit Makeover)
4	Sean Mackay & Ella Cuthbert	24	Hobart, TAS	Engaged Ambos	Eliminated (Gardens & Exteriors)
5	Fiona Taylor & Nicole Prince	44	Lake Fyans, VIC	Best Friends	Eliminated (24 Hour Fix-Up)
6	Troy Campbell & Bec Herning	46 & 39	Heckenberg, New South Wales	Battlers	Eliminated (Interior Renovation)

== Elimination history ==
Teams' progress through the competition
Phase:	Interior Renovation (Phase 1)							Phase 2	Exteriors (Phase 3)			Phase 4	Grand Finale	
Phase:	VIC	SA	WA	NSW	TAS	QLD	Round Total (out of 200)	24 Hour Fix-Up	Round 1	Round 2	Round Total (out of 60)	Charity Unit Makeover	Secret Room	
Team	Scores						Round Total (out of 200)	Round Total (out of 30)	Scores		Round Total (out of 60)	Round Total (out of 30)	Round Total (out of 30)	Result
Aaron & Daniella	24	16	31	31	30	—N/a	2nd (132)	3rd (20)	21	20	3rd (41)	2nd (24)	27	Winners
Kate & Harry	20	—N/a	33	16	34	27	3rd (130)	4th (18)	21	24	1st (45)	1st (30)	25	Runners-up
Andrew & Jono	16	27	—N/a	28	31	27	4th (129)	1st (28)	21	23	2nd (44)	3rd (22)	Eliminated (Episode 34)	
Sean & Ella	22	28	32	25	—N/a	32	1st (139)	2nd (21)	17	18	4th (35)	Eliminated (Episode 30)		
Fiona & Nicole	—N/a	18	23	20	25	21	5th (107)	5th (17)	Eliminated (Episode 26)					
Troy & Bec	18	22	21	—N/a	20	25	6th (106)	Eliminated (Episode 24)						

== Competition details ==
=== Phase 1: Interior Renovation ===
The six teams travel around the country to completely renovate each other's home. Every week, one team hands over their house to their opponents for a complete interior transformation. A set of rules from the owners are given to the teams known as the 'House rules' which need to be followed to gain high scores from the judges and the homeowner team.

==== Victoria: Fiona & Nicole ====
- Episodes 1 to 3
- Airdate — 30 April to 2 May
- Description — Teams head to their first renovation in Lake Fyans, Victoria, the hometown of Fiona & Nicole, to renovate Fiona's house. Two of the bedrooms belong to Fiona's children; Keanan, 11 years old and Bannon, 14 years old. For the first time in House Rules history, the original house will be knocked down and a new house will be completely rebuilt from the ground up.

Renovation 1
Lake Fyans, Victoria
House Rules
Rule 1	Style our shack contemporary country						
Rule 2	Go glam with feminine sparkles in the master suite & lounge						
Rule 3	Compliment blues with pops of red						
Rule 4	Showcase metallics, chunky timber and stone fireplaces						
Rule 5	Splash the family bathroom with stripes						
Bonus Room Rule	Embrace the grampians with an entertainers outdoor room						
Team	Zone	Scores				Total (out of 40)	Running Total (Reno 1)
Team	Zone	Homeowner	Drew	Laurence	Wendy	Total (out of 40)	Running Total (Reno 1)
Aaron & Daniella	Bannon's Bedroom & Kitchen	4	7	6	7	24	24 / 40
Sean & Ella	Family Bathroom & Dining Room	5	6	5	6	22	22 / 40
Kate & Harry	Ensuite & Lounge Room	5	5	5	5	20	20 / 40
Troy & Bec	Laundry, Hallway & Keanan's Bedroom	6	4	4	4	18	18 / 40
Andrew & Jono	Entry, Master Bedroom, Mud Room & Bonus Room	7	6	3	5	16 (21-5)^{1}	16 / 40
Fiona & Nicole	—N/a						—

Notes

*^1 Andrew & Jono received the bonus room and decided to keep it. The bonus room was an Outdoor Entertainment Room. Fiona & Nicole judged it as a fail and the boys lost 5 points, meaning their score of 21 dropped to 16 taking them from 3rd place to bottom place.

==== South Australia: Kate & Harry ====
- Episodes 4 to 7
- Airdate — 3 to 8 May
- Description — Teams head to Kate & Harry's home in Adelaide, South Australia for the second renovation. One of the bedrooms belong to their 2 year old son, Xavier
  - Previous winner's advantage: Aaron & Daniella — Allocating the zones for themselves and all other teams.
  - Previous loser's disadvantage: Andrew & Jono — Camping in a tent during the renovation.

Renovation 2
Adelaide, South Australia
House Rules
Rule 1	Wow us with black and white boho						
Rule 2	Keep it real with no faux						
Rule 3	Place patterned tiles and turquoise in the family bathroom						
Rule 4	Add a touch of pastels						
Rule 5	Black out a "speccy" kitchen						
Bonus Room Rule	Have fun with a playroom for boys of all ages						
Team	Zone	Scores				Total (out of 40)	Running Total (Reno 1 & 2)
Team	Zone	Homeowner	Drew	Laurence	Wendy	Total (out of 40)	Running Total (Reno 1 & 2)
Sean & Ella	Kitchen, Entry & Study Nook	9	6	5	8	28	50 / 80
Andrew & Jono	Dining Room & Ensuite	7	7	6	7	27	43 / 80
Troy & Bec	Xavier's Bedroom & Family Bathroom	6	5	5	6	22	40 / 80
Fiona & Nicole	Lounge Room & Laundry	5	4	4	5	18	18 / 40
Aaron & Daniella	Master Bedroom, Hallway, Linen & Bonus Room	8	4	4	5	16 (21-5)^{2}	40 / 80
Kate & Harry	—N/a						20 / 40

Notes

*^2 Aaron & Daniella received the bonus room and decided to keep it. The bonus room was a Playroom for boys of all ages. Kate & Harry judged it as a fail and the couple lost 5 points, meaning their score of 21 dropped to 16 taking them from 4th place to bottom place.

==== Western Australia: Andrew & Jono ====
- Episodes 8 to 11
- Airdate — 9 to 15 May
- Description — Teams head to Andrew & Jono's home in Mandurah, Western Australia for the third renovation.
  - Previous winner's advantage: Sean & Ella — Allocating the zones for themselves and all other teams.
  - Previous loser's disadvantage: Aaron & Daniella — Camping in a tent during the renovation.

Renovation 3
Mandurah, Western Australia
House Rules
Rule 1	Bring bursts of colour and a retro vibe						
Rule 2	Dial up the quirk factor with geek chic style						
Rule 3	Surprise us with a secret speakeasy bar						
Rule 4	Get graphic with pop art						
Rule 5	Give us a steampunk bathroom						
Bonus Room Rule	Hide a Silicon Valley inspired study						
Team	Zone	Scores				Total (out of 40)	Running Total (Reno 1 to 3)
Team	Zone	Homeowner	Drew	Laurence	Wendy	Total (out of 40)	Running Total (Reno 1 to 3)
Kate & Harry	Andrew's Bedroom & Laundry	8	7	9	9	33	53 / 80
Sean & Ella	Bathroom & Dining Room	7	8	9	8	32	82 / 120
Aaron & Daniella	Lounge Room & Ensuite	7	7	8	9	31	71 / 120
Fiona & Nicole	Entry, Hallway, Bar & Bonus Room	4	4	5	5	23 (18+5)^{3}	41 / 80
Troy & Bec	Jono's Bedroom & Kitchen	5	5	5	6	21	61 / 120
Andrew & Jono	—N/a						43 / 80

Notes

*^3 Sean & Ella received the bonus room but decided not to keep it and gave it to Fiona & Nicole. The bonus room was a Hidden Study. Andrew & Jono judged it as a pass and the team received 5 bonus points, meaning their score of 18 rose to 23 taking them from bottom place to 4th place.

==== New South Wales: Troy & Bec ====
- Episodes 12 to 15
- Airdate — 16 to 22 May
- Description — Teams head to Troy & Bec's home in Heckenberg, New South Wales for the fourth renovation. Two of the bedrooms belong to Bec's children; Hayley, 14 years old & Josh, 11 years old
  - Previous winner's advantage: Kate & Harry — Allocating the zones for themselves and all other teams.
  - Previous loser's disadvantage: Fiona & Nicole — Although Troy & Bec were the lowest scoring team in the previous week, they do not participate in the renovation of their own home, therefore the loser's tent was given to the second-lowest scorer.

Renovation 4
Heckenberg, New South Wales
House Rules
Rule 1	Create an ultra-modern castle to be proud of						
Rule 2	Make a master suite fit for a king and queen						
Rule 3	Wash the home with a watery colour palette						
Rule 4	Celebrate Bec's love of V8s with unique pieces						
Rule 5	Give "the coat hanger" pride of place in the lounge						
Bonus Room Rule	Use Kim Kardashian as inspiration for 14 year-old Hayley's bedroom						
Team	Zone	Scores				Total (out of 40)	Running Total (Reno 1 to 4)
Team	Zone	Homeowner	Drew	Laurence	Wendy	Total (out of 40)	Running Total (Reno 1 to 4)
Aaron & Daniella	Dining Room & Laundry	9	7	8	7	31	102 / 160
Andrew & Jono	Master Bedroom & Kitchen	6	7	7	8	28	71 / 120
Sean & Ella	Josh's Bedroom & Ensuite	2	7	7	9	25	107 / 160
Fiona & Nicole	Lounge Room & Walk-In Robe	4	4	6	6	20	61 / 120
Kate & Harry	Front Stairs, Entry, Hallway, Bathroom & Bonus Room	5	5	5	6	16 (21-5)^{4}	69 / 120
Troy & Bec	—N/a						61 / 120

Notes

*^4 Kate & Harry received the bonus room and decided to keep it. The bonus room was Hayley's Bedroom. Troy & Bec judged it as a fail and the team lost 5 points, meaning their score of 21 dropped to 16 taking them from 4th place to bottom place.

==== Tasmania: Sean & Ella ====
- Episodes 16 to 19
- Airdate — 23 to 29 May
- Description — Teams head to Sean & Ella's home in Hobart, Tasmania for the fifth renovation.
  - Previous winner's advantage: Aaron & Daniella — Allocating the zones for themselves and all other teams.
  - Previous loser's disadvantage: Kate & Harry — Camping in a tent during the renovation.

Renovation 5
Hobart, Tasmania
House Rules
Rule 1	Keep calm with an "industrial Scandi" home						
Rule 2	Feature concrete and marble in the kitchen and bathroom						
Rule 3	Get creative with cowhide and texture						
Rule 4	Bring in soft pink and lots of greenery						
Rule 5	Be bold with a big upcycled piece in each room						
Bonus Room Rule	Create a Nordic hideaway in the guest bedroom						
Team	Zone	Scores				Total (out of 40)	Running Total (Reno 1 to 5)
Team	Zone	Homeowner	Drew	Laurence	Wendy	Total (out of 40)	Running Total (Reno 1 to 5)
Kate & Harry	Ensuite & Dining Room	9	7	10	8	34	103 / 160
Andrew & Jono	Master Bedroom & Laundry	7	9	6	9	31	102 / 160
Aaron & Daniella	Entry & Kitchen	8	8	6	8	30	132 / 200
Fiona & Nicole	Lounge Room & Hallway	4	6	8	7	25	86 / 160
Troy & Bec	Bathroom, Study & Bonus Room	4	7	7	7	20 (25-5)^{5}	81 / 160
Sean & Ella	—N/a						107 / 160

Notes

*^5 Aaron & Daniella received the bonus room but decided not to keep it and gave it to Troy & Bec. The bonus room was the Guest Bedroom. Sean & Ella judged it as a fail and the team lost 5 points, meaning their score of 25 dropped to 20 taking them from equal bottom place (with Fiona & Nicole) to bottom place.

==== Queensland: Aaron & Daniella ====
- Episodes 20 to 23
- Airdate — 30 May to 5 June
- Description — Teams head to Aaron & Daniella's home in Gold Coast, Queensland for the sixth and final interior renovation. Two of the bedrooms belong to their children; Jaxon, 3 years old & Brooklyn, 8 months old. The lowest scoring team overall will be eliminated
  - Previous winner's advantage: Kate & Harry — Allocating the zones for themselves and all other teams.
  - Previous loser's disadvantage: Troy & Bec — Camping in a tent during the renovation.

Renovation 6
Gold Coast, Queensland
House Rules
Rule 1	Create a luxury tropical oasis						
Rule 2	Brighten our lives with GC bling						
Rule 3	Impress us with timber and wallpeper in every zone						
Rule 4	Take us to the Bahamas in our living spaces						
Rule 5	Spoil us with a 5 star hotel master suite						
Bonus Room Rule	Give Aaron a place to pump iron						
Team	Zone	Scores				Total (out of 40)	Final Total (Reno 1 to 6)
Team	Zone	Homeowner	Drew	Laurence	Wendy	Total (out of 40)	Final Total (Reno 1 to 6)
Sean & Ella	Lounge Room, Laundry & Hallway 2	8	7	8	9	32	1st (139)
Aaron & Daniella	—N/a						2nd (132)
Kate & Harry	Kitchen, Playroom & Hallway 1	9	5	6	7	27	3rd (130)
Andrew & Jono	Bathroom, Dining Room & Pantry	6	6	7	8	27	4th (129)
Fiona & Nicole	Ensuite & Brooklyn's Bedroom	6	4	5	6	21	5th (107)
Troy & Bec	Entry, Master Bedroom, Jaxon's Bedroom & Bonus Room	6	3	5	6	25 (20+5)^{6}	6th (106)

Notes

*^6 Kate & Harry received the bonus room but decided not to keep it and gave it to Troy & Bec. The bonus room was a Gym. Aaron & Daniella judged it as a pass and the team gained bonus 5 points, meaning their score of 20 rose to 25 taking them from 5th place to 4th place, but their overall score had them eliminated.

=== Phase 2 ===
==== 24 Hour Fix-Up ====
- Episode 24 & 25
- Airdate — 6 & 11 June
- Description — All teams head back to their own homes and must fix and redo one of the zones in 24 hours. Teams need to recreate the space/s to reflect their own style and also to impress the judges. All teams received the same set of five rules for the challenge. The lowest scoring team will be eliminated.

Renovation summary
24 Hour Fix-Up
House Rules
Rule 1	Choose one zone				
Rule 2	Make this zone your own				
Rule 3	Showcase your skills with a statement piece				
Rule 4	Your budget is $5000				
Rule 5	Stay together at all times				
Team	Zone	Scores			Round Total (out of 30)
Team	Zone	Drew	Laurence	Wendy	Round Total (out of 30)
Andrew & Jono	Entry, Hallway & Bar	9	9	10	28
Sean & Ella	Lounge Room & Hallway	7	7	7	21
Aaron & Daniella	Entry, Master Bedroom & Jaxon's Bedroom	7	5	8	20
Kate & Harry	Lounge Room & Laundry	6	5	7	18
Fiona & Nicole	Laundry, Hallway & Keanan's Bedroom	5	6	6	17

=== Phase 3: Gardens & Exteriors ===
The top four teams are challenged to transform the exteriors and gardens of each other's homes. Two teams are allocated to a home (that do not belong to them) and must renovate either the front or back yards, as well as improving the house exterior. They are held over two rounds, covering all houses of the current teams. After both rounds are complete, the lowest scoring team is eliminated.

==== Round 1 ====
- Episodes 26 & 28
- Airdate — 12 & 18 June
- Description — In round 1 of the exterior renovations, the 4 remaining teams head to the Gold Coast and Hobart to transform the gardens and house exterior in 4 Days. Teams are allocated to the front or back yard of either Aaron & Daniella's or Sean & Ella's

Renovation summary
Round 1
House Rules	Aaron & Daniella's (QLD)	Sean & Ella's (TAS)
Rule 1	Make every day a holiday with a tropical resort garden	Keep it simple with a no fuss Scandi garden
Rule 2	Pimp our pool area	Make the most of the view with an entertainers' deck
Rule 3	Go OTT with GC style at the entry	Give us an edible garden out the back
Rule 4	Be playful with a space for our boys out the back	Warm us up with a fire pit out the front
Rule 5	Choose your zone: front or back	

Team	House	Zone	Scores			Total (out of 30)	Running Total (Round 1)
Team	House	Zone	Drew	Laurence	Wendy	Total (out of 30)	Running Total (Round 1)
Aaron & Daniella	Sean & Ella's (Hobart, TAS)	Frontyard - Driveway, Fire Pit & Upper and Lower Deck	8	5	8	21	21 / 30
Andrew & Jono	Sean & Ella's (Hobart, TAS)	Backyard - Edible Garden, Entry, Outdoor Lounge	7	7	7	21	21 / 30
Kate & Harry	Aaron & Daniella's (Gold Coast, QLD)^{7}	Frontyard - Carport, Driveway, Entry & Outdoor Lounge	5	9	7	21	21 / 30
Sean & Ella	Aaron & Daniella's (Gold Coast, QLD)^{7}	Backyard - Exercise area, Cubby House & Pool	6	4	7	17	17 / 30

Notes

*^7 During the renovation at Aaron & Daniella's House, the clock was stopped and the teams and crew had to leave the house due to the weather conditions caused by Cyclone Debbie.

==== Round 2 ====
- Episodes 29 & 30
- Airdate — 19 & 25 June
- Description — In round 2 of the exterior renovations, the 4 remaining teams head to Mandurah and Adelaide to transform the gardens and house exterior in 4 Days. Teams are allocated to the front or back yard of either Andrew & Jono's or Kate & Harry's house. The lowest scoring team overall is eliminated.

Renovation summary
Round 2
House Rules	Andrew & Jono's (WA)	Kate & Harry's (SA)
Rule 1	Get colourful with a modern native garden	Give us a relaxed boho garden
Rule 2	Bring the façade into the 21st century	Use stone and texture
Rule 3	Give us a geek chic beer garden out the back	Make a tribal play area for Xavier
Rule 4	Create a place to shoot hoops	Create a lush vertical garden
Rule 5	Choose your zone: front or back	

Team	House	Zone	Scores			Total (out of 30)	Final Total (Round 1 & 2)
Team	House	Zone	Drew	Laurence	Wendy	Total (out of 30)	Final Total (Round 1 & 2)
Kate & Harry	Andrew & Jono's (Mandurah, WA)	Backyard - Basketball Court, Beer Garden & Deck	7	8	9	24	1st (45)
Aaron & Daniella	Andrew & Jono's (Mandurah, WA)	Frontyard - Architectural Garden, Driveway & Entry	8	7	5	20	3rd (41)
Andrew & Jono	Kate & Harry's (Adelaide, SA)	Backyard - Deck, Play Area & Outdoor Lounge	6	9	8	23	2nd (44)
Sean & Ella	Kate & Harry's (Adelaide, SA)	Frontyard - Driveway, Entry, Play Area & Vertical Garden	5	6	7	18	4th (35)

=== Phase 4 ===
==== Charity Unit Makeover ====
- Episodes 31 to 34
- Airdate — 26 June to 4 July
- Description — The 3 remaining teams have 7 days to renovate 3 units in The Bezzina House in St George, Sydney where cancer patients stay during treatment. The teams are given a unit each and they must follow the rules that are, for the first time, given by the judges', each team are only given one judges' rules to follow. Each team must also renovate a zone in the Common Area. The lowest-scoring team will be eliminated & the top 2 will advance into the live Grand Final.
  - Previous winner's advantage: Kate & Harry — Allocating a judges' rules to each of the teams and themselves

Renovation summary
Charity Unit Makeover
Drew's Rules
Rule 1	Get back to nature with 'easy modern' style				
Rule 2	Be inspired by the colours of sunsets				
Rule 3	In every room make one thing do two things				
Laurence's Rules
Rule 1	Charm me with neoclassical style				
Rule 2	Colour with coral, paprika, silver and mother of pearl				
Rule 3	Indulge my love of antiques and taxidermy				
Wendy's Rules
Rule 1	Bring back the best of art deco				
Rule 2	Mix indigo and emerald tones				
Rule 3	Create spaces for quiet moments of private healing				
Common Area Rules
Rule 1	Freestyle - you decide				
Rule 2	The style must flow through all 3 zones				
Rule 3	Choose your zone				
Team	Zone	Scores			Round Total (out of 30)
Team	Zone	Drew	Laurence	Wendy	Round Total (out of 30)
Kate & Harry	Laurence's Rules Unit & Common Area Living Room	9	10	10	30 (29 + 1)^{8}
Aaron & Daniella	Wendy's Rules Unit & Common Area Dining Room	8	8	8	24
Andrew & Jono	Drew's Rules Unit & Common Area Kitchen	7	7	8	22

Notes

*^8 Each team had to submit a statement piece to be judged, the winners were Kate & Harry who received 1 bonus point which will go towards their total score

=== Grand Final ===
- Episode 35
- Airdate — 9 July
- Description — The final 2 teams complete one final challenge at their opponent's home. This will be the first season to not have a live Grand Final and the winners of will only be decided by the judges' scores. The team that receives the highest score will win the season and receive $200,000.

Renovation summary
Grand Final
House Rules	Aaron & Daniella's (QLD)	Kate & Harry's (SA)
Rule 1	Celebrate Vegas with a pool party cabana	Create the ultimate boho blokes' hangout
Rule 2	Give us glamour with a cocktail bar	Get creative with a tool shed for Harry
Rule 3	Keep the Aussie flavour with a BBQ area	Indulge our green thumbs throughout the space

Team	Area	Scores			Total (out of 30)	Final Result
Team	Area	Drew	Laurence	Wendy	Total (out of 30)	Final Result
Aaron & Daniella	Blokes' Hangout, Sanctuary & Tool Shed	9	9	9	27	Winners
Kate & Harry	Cocktail Bar, BBQ Area & Pool Cabana	8	9	8	25	Runners-up

== Ratings ==
Colour key:
– Highest rating during the season
– Lowest rating during the season

Wk.	Ep no.	Episode titles by stage of season				Air date	Viewers (millions)^{[a]}	Nightly rank^{[a]}	Source
1	1	Phase 1: Interior Renovation	VIC Renovation (Fiona & Nicole)	Introduction		Sunday, 30 April	1.000	#6	
1	2	Phase 1: Interior Renovation	VIC Renovation (Fiona & Nicole)	Renovation Continues		Monday, 1 May	0.606	#16	
1	3	Phase 1: Interior Renovation	VIC Renovation (Fiona & Nicole)	House Reveal	Judges Scores	Tuesday, 2 May	0.767	#10	
1	4	Phase 1: Interior Renovation	VIC Renovation (Fiona & Nicole)	House Reveal	Homeowners Scores	Tuesday, 2 May	0.788	#8	
2	5	Phase 1: Interior Renovation	SA Renovation (Kate & Harry)	Introduction		Wednesday, 3 May	0.645	#10	
2	6	Phase 1: Interior Renovation	SA Renovation (Kate & Harry)	Renovation Continues		Thursday, 4 May	0.630	#11	
2	7	Phase 1: Interior Renovation	SA Renovation (Kate & Harry)	House Reveal	Judges Scores	Sunday, 7 May	0.799	#4	
2	8	Phase 1: Interior Renovation	SA Renovation (Kate & Harry)	House Reveal	Homeowners Scores	Monday, 8 May	0.874	#7	
3	9	Phase 1: Interior Renovation	WA Renovation (Andrew & Jono)	Introduction		Tuesday, 9 May	0.795	#7	
3	10	Phase 1: Interior Renovation	WA Renovation (Andrew & Jono)	Renovation Continues		Wednesday, 10 May	0.751	#7	
3	11	Phase 1: Interior Renovation	WA Renovation (Andrew & Jono)	House Reveal	Judges Scores	Sunday, 14 May	0.927	#4	
3	12	Phase 1: Interior Renovation	WA Renovation (Andrew & Jono)	House Reveal	Homeowners Scores	Monday, 15 May	0.901	#7	
4	13	Phase 1: Interior Renovation	NSW Renovation (Troy & Bec)	Introduction		Tuesday, 16 May	0.812	#7	
4	14	Phase 1: Interior Renovation	NSW Renovation (Troy & Bec)	Renovation Continues		Wednesday, 17 May	0.807	#7	
4	15	Phase 1: Interior Renovation	NSW Renovation (Troy & Bec)	House Reveal	Judges Scores	Sunday, 21 May	1.049	#4	
4	16	Phase 1: Interior Renovation	NSW Renovation (Troy & Bec)	House Reveal	Homeowners Scores	Monday, 22 May	1.026	#5	
5	17	Phase 1: Interior Renovation	TAS Renovation (Sean & Ella)	Introduction		Tuesday, 23 May	0.914	#6	
5	18	Phase 1: Interior Renovation	TAS Renovation (Sean & Ella)	Renovation Continues		Wednesday, 24 May	0.936	#5	
5	19	Phase 1: Interior Renovation	TAS Renovation (Sean & Ella)	House Reveal	Judges Scores	Sunday, 28 May	1.186	#2	
5	20	Phase 1: Interior Renovation	TAS Renovation (Sean & Ella)	House Reveal	Homeowners Scores	Monday, 29 May	1.272	#1	
6	21	Phase 1: Interior Renovation	QLD Renovation (Aaron & Daniella)	Introduction		Tuesday, 30 May	1.145	#1	
6	22	Phase 1: Interior Renovation	QLD Renovation (Aaron & Daniella)	Renovation Continues		Wednesday, 31 May^{[b]}	0.585	#15	
6	22	Phase 1: Interior Renovation	QLD Renovation (Aaron & Daniella)	Renovation Continues		Thursday, 1 June^{[c]}	0.446	#18	
6	23	Phase 1: Interior Renovation	QLD Renovation (Aaron & Daniella)	House Reveal	Judges Scores	Sunday, 4 June	1.279	#1	
6	24	Phase 1: Interior Renovation	QLD Renovation (Aaron & Daniella)	House Reveal	Homeowners Scores	Monday, 5 June	1.218	#2	
7	25	Phase 2: 24 Hour Fix-Up		Introduction		Tuesday, 6 June	1.087	#4	
7	26	Phase 2: 24 Hour Fix-Up		Reveal & Elimination		Sunday, 11 June	1.089	#2	
8	27	Phase 3: Gardens & Exteriors	Round 1	Introduction		Monday, 12 June	0.999	#6	
8	28	Phase 3: Gardens & Exteriors	Round 1	Reveal		Sunday, 18 June	1.108	#3	
8	29	Phase 3: Gardens & Exteriors	Round 2	Introduction		Monday, 19 June	1.019	#6	
8	30	Phase 3: Gardens & Exteriors	Round 2	Reveal & Elimination		Sunday, 25 June	1.118	#3	
9	31	Phase 4: Charity Unit Makeover		Introduction		Monday, 26 June	0.965	#6	
9	32	Phase 4: Charity Unit Makeover		Renovation Continues		Sunday, 2 July	1.009	#6	
9	33	Phase 4: Charity Unit Makeover		Renovation Continues		Monday, 3 July	0.949	#6	
9	34	Phase 4: Charity Unit Makeover		Reveal & Elimination		Tuesday, 4 July	0.976	#5	
10	35	Grand Final		Final Rooms & Judging		Sunday, 9 July	1.007	#5	
10	35	Grand Final		Winner announced		Sunday, 9 July	1.142	#4	

Episode		Air date	Viewers (millions)^{[a]}	Nightly rank^{[a]}	Source
Special	House Rules: Top 10 Reveals	Tuesday, 13 June	0.771	#9	

^{a} Ratings data used is from OzTAM and represents the live and same day average viewership from the five largest Australian metropolitan centres (Sydney, Melbourne, Brisbane, Perth and Adelaide).

== Notes ==
- ^{b} Melbourne, Adelaide & Perth only
- ^{c} Sydney & Brisbane only
