= House Rules season 7 =

House Rules
- Season 7
- No. of episodes: 43

Release
- Original network: Seven Network
- Original release: 28 April – 23 July 2019

Season chronology
- ← Previous; Season 6 Next → Season 8

The seventh season of Australian reality television series House Rules began airing on 28 April 2019. The series is produced by the team who created the Seven reality show My Kitchen Rules. This is Johanna Griggs final season as host.

Season 7 was confirmed in June 2018 with applications for the seventh season of House Rules open between June and 7 September 2018 on the official Network Seven website. Season 7 was officially confirmed in October 2018, as well with the announcement of new judge, Jamie Durie, who replaces Drew Heath. Production for the series began in November 2018.

This season of House Rules consisted of new teams renovating each other's homes and further challenges for an ultimate prize of $250,000.

== Format changes ==
- Teams – This season includes six teams instead of seven teams like in the previous season.
- Prize Money – Unlike the previous season, the prize money is already pre-determined. The prize for this season is $250,000.
- Advantage – When a team has the highest score after a house renovation, they receive an advantage of 5 bonus points and $5000 for the next renovation; however, to get the advantage, they and another team (of their choice) have to reveal a room early, judged by the homeowners. The team with the best room receives the advantage.
- House Evaluation – After each interior renovation and exterior renovation, a property expert from Century 21 valued each teams houses. They told the team the evaluation of the house before the renovation was complete and then give them a card with the new evaluation, after the completed renovation.

Interior Renovation House Evaluation
| Team | Evaluation | | Added Value |
| Team | Before Renovation | After Renovation | Added Value |
|---|---|---|---|
| Pete & Courtney | $720,000 | $850,000 | $130,000 |
| Lisa & Andy | $311,000 | $425,000 | $114,000 |
| Mikaela & Eliza | $725,000 | $825,000 | $100,000 |
| Tim & Mat | $930,000 | $1,075,000 | $145,000 |
| Shayn & Carly | $460,000 | $585,000 | $125,000 |
| Katie & Alex | $430,000 | $760,000 | $330,000 |
Garden/Exterior Evaluation
| Team | Evaluation | | Added Value |
| Team | After IR Renovation | After G/E Renovation | Added Value |
| Lisa & Andy | $425,000 | $475,000 | $50,000 |
| Tim & Mat | $1,075,000 | $1,110,000 | $35,000 |
| Shayn & Carly | $585,000 | $610,000 | $25,000 |
| Pete & Courtney | $850,000 | $940,000 | $90,000 |

- Grand Final – For the first time in House Rules history, three teams will compete against each other in the Grand Final, unlike previous seasons where it had only ever been two teams.

== Contestant Teams ==
| Team | | Ages | House | Relationship | Status |
|---|---|---|---|---|---|
| 1 | Pete & Courtney | 32 & 31 | Ferntree Gully, VIC | Married Dance Teachers | Winners |
| 2 | Tim Clark & Mat Cassim | 32 & 27 | Melbourne, VIC | Melbourne Brothers | Runners-up |
| 3 | Lisa & Andy Carman | 30 & 32 | Adelaide, SA | Hostie & Fireman | Third Place |
| 4 | Shayn & Carly Clark | 33 & 31 | Aroona, QLD | Sunny Coast Couple | Eliminated (Phase 3: Garden & Exteriors) |
| 5 | Katie & Alex Middlemiss | 29 & 32 | Gundaroo, NSW | Small Town Parents | Eliminated (Phase 2: Give Back House) |
| 6 | Mikaela & Eliza Greene | 24 & 21 | Yallingup, WA | Surfer Sisters | Eliminated (Phase 1: Interior Renovation) |

== Elimination history ==
Teams' progress through the competition
| Phase: | WHA | Interior Renovation (Phase 2) | | | | | | | Phase 3 | Exteriors (Phase 4) | | | | | Grand Final | |
| Phase: | WHA | VIC | SA | WA | VIC | QLD | NSW | Round Total (out of 230) | Give Back House | Round 1 | Round 2 | Round 3 | Round 4 | Round Total (out of 120) | Luxury Loft | |
| Team | Scores | | | | | | | Round Total (out of 230) | Round Total (out of 30) | Scores | | | | Round Total (out of 120) | Round Total (out of 30) | Final Result |
| Pete & Courtney | 18 | — | 27 | 27 | 33 | 33 | 32 | 4th (170) | =2nd (23) | 25 | 35 | 33 | — | 2nd (93) | 29 | Winners |
| Tim & Mat | 20 | 29 | 33 | 31 | — | 34 | 41 | 1st (188) | 4th (22) | 36 | — | 28 | 40 | 1st (104) | 27 | Runners-up |
| Lisa & Andy | 15 | 29 | — | 26 | 28 | 29 | 30 | 5th (157) | 1st (25) | — | 30 | 36 | 25 | 3rd (91) | 26 | Third Place |
| Shayn & Carly | 21 | 24 | 31 | 35 | 33 | — | 34 | 2nd (178) | =2nd (23) | 29 | 31 | — | 25 | 4th (85) | Eliminated (Episode 41) | |
| Katie & Alex | 20 | 35 | 34 | 30 | 21 | 33 | — | 3rd (173) | 5th (19) | Eliminated (Episode 29) | | | | | | |
| Mikaela & Eliza | 22 | 26 | 25 | — | 22 | 27 | 31 | 6th (153) | Eliminated (Episode 26) | | | | | | | |

== Competition Details ==
=== Phase 1: Warehouse Apartment ===
- Episode 1 & 2
- Airdate — 28 & 29 April
- Description — In the first challenge, the teams had three days to renovate a room each in a warehouse apartment (which is above their new home base). The highest scoring team will receive an advantage for the first interior renovation.

Warehouse Apartment
Sydney, New South Wales
House Rules
| Rule 1 | Expose the warehouse | | | | | |
| Rule 2 | Show us what’s "hot" right now | | | | | |
| Rule 3 | Create a jewel in each room | | | | | |
| Rule 4 | Breathe life back in with colour | | | | | |
| Rule 5 | Stay together at all times | | | | | |
| Team | Zone | Scores | | | Total (out of 30) | Running Total (WHA) |
| Team | Zone | Jamie | Laurence | Wendy | Total (out of 30) | Running Total (WHA) |
| Mikaela & Eliza | Bedroom 3 | 8 | 7 | 7 | 22 | 22 / 30 |
| Shayn & Carly | Study | 7 | 8 | 6 | 21 | 21 / 30 |
| Katie & Alex | Bedroom 2 | 7 | 8 | 5 | 20 | 20 / 30 |
| Tim & Mat | Bedroom 1 | 8 | 6 | 6 | 20 | 20 / 30 |
| Pete & Courtney | Loungeroom | 6 | 6 | 6 | 18 | 18 / 30 |
| Lisa & Andy | Dining room | 5 | 5 | 5 | 15 | 15 / 30 |

=== Phase 2: Interior Renovation ===
The six teams traveled around the country to completely renovate each other's home. Every week, one team handed over their house to their opponents for a complete interior transformation. A set of rules from the owners were given to the teams known as the 'House Rules' which needed to be followed to gain high scores from the judges and the homeowner team.

==== Victoria: Pete & Courtney ====
- Episodes 3 to 6
- Airdate — 30 April to 6 May
- Description — Teams headed to Pete & Courtney’s home in Ferntree Gully, Victoria for the first renovation. One of the bedrooms belong to their one year old son, Casper
  - Previous winner's advantage: Lisa & Andy — 5 bonus points and $5000 for their next renovation^{1}
  - Previous loser's disadvantage: Lisa & Andy — Camping in a tent during the renovation.

Renovation 1
Ferntree Gully, Victoria
House Rules
| Rule 1 | Indulge us with bold opulence | | | | | | |
| Rule 2 | Use green, burgundy, blue & black | | | | | | |
| Rule 3 | Add drama with moody metallics | | | | | | |
| Rule 4 | Excite with an entertainers kitchen | | | | | | |
| Rule 5 | Give us more than the obvious | | | | | | |
| Team | Zone | Scores | | | | Total (out of 40) | Running Total (WHA + Reno 1) |
| Team | Zone | Homeowner | Jamie | Laurence | Wendy | Total (out of 40) | Running Total (WHA + Reno 1) |
| Katie & Alex | Casper’s Room, Bathroom & WIR | 10 | 8 | 9 | 8 | 35 | 55 / 70 |
| Tim & Mat | Kitchen, Guest Bedroom & Hallway 2 | 8 | 7 | 7 | 7 | 29 | 49 / 70 |
| Lisa & Andy | Dining Room, Dressing Room & Hallway 1 | 6 | 6 | 6 | 6 | 29 (24 + 5)^{1} | 44 / 70 |
| Mikaela & Eliza | Loungeroom, Ensuite & Powder Room | 7 | 6 | 7 | 6 | 26 | 48 / 70 |
| Shayn & Carly | Master Bedroom, Laundry & Entry | 8 | 5 | 6 | 5 | 24 | 45 / 70 |
| Pete & Courtney | — | | | | | | 18 / 30 |

Notes

*^1 Mikaela & Eliza first received the advantage, however had to compete against another team (Lisa & Andy) in early room reveal. Judged by the homeowners, they chose Lisa & Andy’s room, who received 5 bonus points

==== South Australia: Lisa & Andy ====
- Episodes 7 to 10
- Airdate — 7 to 13 May
- Description — Teams headed to Lisa & Andy’s home in Adelaide, South Australia for the second renovation.
  - Previous winner's advantage: Katie & Alex — 5 bonus points and $5000 for their next renovation^{2}
  - Previous loser's disadvantage: Shayn & Carly — Camping in a tent during the renovation.

Renovation 2
Adelaide, South Australia
House Rules
| Rule 1 | Create a Nordic sanctuary | | | | | | |
| Rule 2 | Use timber & soft tones | | | | | | |
| Rule 3 | Deliver a knockout piece in each room | | | | | | |
| Rule 4 | Give us a breathtaking bathroom | | | | | | |
| Rule 5 | Bring "suave sixties" to the den | | | | | | |
| Team | Zone | Scores | | | | Total (out of 40) | Running Total (WHA + Reno 1 & 2) |
| Team | Zone | Homeowner | Jamie | Laurence | Wendy | Total (out of 40) | Running Total (WHA + Reno 1 & 2) |
| Katie & Alex | Kitchen & Guest Bedroom | 8 | 7 | 7 | 7 | 34 (29 + 5)^{2} | 89 / 110 |
| Tim & Mat | Dining Room & Bathroom | 8 | 8 | 9 | 8 | 33 | 82 / 110 |
| Shayn & Carly | Loungeroom & Ensuite | 10 | 7 | 7 | 7 | 31 | 76 / 110 |
| Pete & Courtney | Master Bedroom, Hallway & Entry | 6 | 7 | 7 | 7 | 27 | 45 / 70 |
| Mikaela & Eliza | Laundry & Den | 7 | 6 | 6 | 6 | 25 | 73 / 110 |
| Lisa & Andy | — | | | | | | 44 / 70 |

Notes

*^2 Katie & Alex first received the advantage, however had to compete against another team (Pete & Courtney) in early room reveal. Judged by the homeowners, they chose Katie & Alex’s room, who received 5 bonus points

==== Western Australia: Mikaela & Eliza ====
- Episodes 11 to 14
- Airdate — 14 to 20 May
- Description — Teams headed to Mikaela & Eliza’s home in Yallingup, Western Australia for the third renovation. The home belongs to their mum, Kristen.
  - Previous winner's advantage: Shayn & Carly — 5 bonus points and $5000 for their next renovation^{3}
  - Previous loser's disadvantage: Due to a unanimous vote Mikaela & Eliza have to stay in the tent next renovation as they came last in the renovation before their home.

Renovation 3
Yallingup, Western Australia
House Rules
| Rule 1 | Give the house a coastal heart | | | | | | |
| Rule 2 | Think beach for your colour scheme | | | | | | |
| Rule 3 | Bring nature into nurture | | | | | | |
| Rule 4 | Create a cool, tropical resort for Eliza | | | | | | |
| Rule 5 | Celebrate Miakela’s adventurous soul | | | | | | |
| Team | Zone | Scores | | | | Total (out of 40) | Running Total (WHA + Reno 1 to 3) |
| Team | Zone | Homeowner | Jamie | Laurence | Wendy | Total (out of 40) | Running Total (WHA + Reno 1 to 3) |
| Shayn & Carly | Kitchen & Eliza's Bedroom | 9 | 7 | 7 | 7 | 35 (30 + 5) | 111 / 150 |
| Tim & Mat | Master Bedroom, Dressing Room & Laundry | 8 | 8 | 7 | 8 | 31 | 113 / 150 |
| Katie & Alex | Dining Room, Study & Walk-in-robe | 10 | 7 | 7 | 6 | 30 | 119 / 150 |
| Pete & Courtney | Loungeroom, Ensuite & Hallway | 6 | 7 | 7 | 7 | 27 | 72 / 110 |
| Lisa & Andy | Entry, Bathroom & Mikaela's Bedroom | 7 | 6 | 6 | 7 | 26 | 70 / 110 |
| Mikaela & Eliza | — | | | | | | 73 / 110 |

Notes

*^3 Katie & Alex first received the advantage, however had to compete against another team (Shayn & Carly) in early room reveal. Judged by the homeowners, they chose Shayn & Carly’s room, who received 5 bonus points

==== Victoria: Tim & Mat ====
- Episodes 15 to 18
- Airdate — 21 to 27 May
- Description — Teams headed to Tim & Mat’s home in Melbourne, Victoria for the fourth renovation. The home belongs to Tim and his wife Kate and their one year-old daughter, Isabella.
  - Previous winner's advantage: Lisa & Andy — 5 bonus points and $5000 for their next renovation^{4}
  - Previous loser's disadvantage: Lisa & Andy and Mikaela & Eliza — Camping in a tent during the renovation. Due to a unanimous vote Mikaela & Eliza have to stay in the tent as they came last in the renovation before their home.

Renovation 4
Melbourne, Victoria
House Rules
| Rule 1 | Fuse industrial with sleek | | | | | | |
| Rule 2 | Choose timber, terrazzo & steel | | | | | | |
| Rule 3 | Be cool with blue & green | | | | | | |
| Rule 4 | Add warmth with furnishings | | | | | | |
| Rule 5 | Bring Melbourne style with a graphic edge | | | | | | |
| Team | Zone | Scores | | | | Total (out of 40) | Running Total (WHA + Reno 1 to 4) |
| Team | Zone | Homeowner | Jamie | Laurence | Wendy | Total (out of 40) | Running Total (WHA + Reno 1 to 4) |
| Shayn & Carly | Dining Room, Mud Room & Bathroom | 7 | 9 | 8 | 9 | 33 | 144 / 190 |
| Pete & Courtney | Kitchen & Isabella's Room | 10 | 8 | 7 | 8 | 33 | 105 / 150 |
| Lisa & Andy | Den, Ensuite & Walk-in-robe | 7 | 6 | 3 | 7 | 28 (23 + 5)^{4} | 98 / 150 |
| Mikaela & Eliza | Master Bedroom & Laundry | 7 | 6 | 3 | 6 | 22 | 95 / 150 |
| Katie & Alex | Loungeroom, Entry & Hallway | 7 | 6 | 3 | 5 | 21 | 140 / 190 |
| Tim & Mat | — | | | | | | 113 / 150 |

Notes

*^4 Shayn & Carly first received the advantage, however had to compete against another team (Lisa & Andy) in early room reveal. Judged by the homeowners, they chose Lisa & Andy’s room, who received 5 bonus points

==== Queensland: Shayn & Carly ====
- Episodes 19 to 22
- Airdate — 28 May to 3 June
- Description — Teams headed to Shayn & Carly’s home in Aroona, Queensland for the fifth renovation. Two of the bedrooms belong to their daughters; Harper, five years old and Imogen, three years old.
  - Previous winner's advantage: Pete & Courtney — 5 bonus points and $5000 for their next renovation^{5}
  - Previous loser's disadvantage: Katie & Alex — Camping in a tent during the renovation.

Renovation 5
Aroona, Queensland
House Rules
| Rule 1 | Make small feel big | | | | | | |
| Rule 2 | Hide function with form | | | | | | |
| Rule 3 | Let there be light | | | | | | |
| Rule 4 | Use oak and aqua | | | | | | |
| Rule 5 | Give the girls a mermaid’s bathroom | | | | | | |
| Team | Zone | Scores | | | | Total (out of 40) | Running Total (WHA + Reno 1 to 5) |
| Team | Zone | Homeowner | Jamie | Laurence | Wendy | Total (out of 40) | Running Total (WHA + Reno 1 to 5) |
| Tim & Mat | Entry, Hallyway & Ensuite | 10 | 9 | 6 | 9 | 34 | 147 / 190 |
| Katie & Alex | Master Bedroom & Laundry | 9 | 7 | 9 | 8 | 33 | 173 / 230 |
| Pete & Courtney | Dining Room & Imogen's Bedroom | 8 | 7 | 6 | 7 | 33 (28 + 5)^{5} | 138 / 190 |
| Lisa & Andy | Loungeroom & Bathroom | 7 | 7 | 8 | 7 | 29 | 127 / 190 |
| Mikaela & Eliza | Kitchen & Harper's Bedroom | 6 | 7 | 8 | 6 | 27 | 122 / 190 |
| Shayn & Carly | — | | | | | | 144 / 190 |

Notes

*^5 Pete & Courtney first received the advantage, however had to compete against another team (Tim & Mat) in early room reveal. Judged by the homeowners, they chose Pete & Courtney’s room, who received 5 bonus points

==== New South Wales: Katie & Alex ====
- Episodes 23 to 26
- Airdate — 4 to 10 June
- Description — Teams headed to Katie & Alex’s home in Gundaroo, NSW for the sixth and final interior renovation. One of the bedrooms belong to their one year old daughter, Hallie. The lowest scoring team overall will be eliminated.
  - Previous winner's advantage: Tim & Mat — 5 bonus points and $5000 for their next renovation^{6}
  - Previous loser's disadvantage: Mikaela & Eliza — Camping in a tent during the renovation.

Renovation 6
Gundaroo, New South Wales
House Rules
| Rule 1 | Build a 21st century country house | | | | | | |
| Rule 2 | Keep it eco-friendly | | | | | | |
| Rule 3 | Accent with modern pastels | | | | | | |
| Rule 4 | Go calm & cosy in Hallie’s room | | | | | | |
| Rule 5 | Bring a rainforest vibe to the bathroom | | | | | | |
| Team | Zone | Scores | | | | Total (out of 40) | Final Total (WHA + Reno 1 to 6) |
| Team | Zone | Homeowner | Jamie | Laurence | Wendy | Total (out of 40) | Final Total (WHA + Reno 1 to 6) |
| Tim & Mat | Loungeroom & Hallie's Room | 10 | 9 | 9 | 8 | 41 (36 + 5)^{6} | 1st (188) |
| Shayn & Carly | Foyer & Guest Bedroom | 8 | 8 | 9 | 9 | 34 | 2nd (178) |
| Katie & Alex | — | | | | | | 3rd (173) |
| Pete & Courtney | Entry, WIR, Kids Corner & Bathroom | 9 | 7 | 9 | 7 | 32 | 4th (170) |
| Lisa & Andy | Kitchen, Master Bedroom & Laundry | 9 | 7 | 7 | 7 | 30 | 5th (157) |
| Mikaela & Eliza | Dining Room & Ensuite | 8 | 7 | 8 | 8 | 31 | 6th (153) |

Notes

*^6 Tim & Mat first received the advantage, however had to compete against another team (Mikaela & Eliza) in early room reveal. Judged by the homeowners, they chose Tim & Mat’s room, who received 5 bonus points.

=== Phase 3 ===
==== Give Back House ====
- Episodes 27 to 29
- Airdate — 16 to 23 June
- Description — The 5 remaining teams headed to Campbelltown, New South Wales, namely the home of Mary, Graeme and their four shared children, whose home caught fire due to a faulty appliance and burnt down. The teams will renovate the house from the framework remaining of the house. The lowest scoring team at the end of the round was eliminated.
  - Previous winner's advantage: Tim & Mat — Keep or swap their zone, Bonus Room^{7} & a personal driver

Renovation summary
Give Back House
House Rules
| Rule 1 | Style us montauk modern | | | | |
| Rule 2 | Bring the family together with inviting spaces | | | | |
| Rule 3 | Keep it classic with navy, white & grey | | | | |
| Rule 4 | Make it fresh, clean & no fuss | | | | |
| Rule 5 | Get clever with storage | | | | |
| Bonus Room Rule | Create a family space with something for everyone | | | | |
| Team | Zone | Scores | | | Round Total (out of 30) |
| Team | Zone | Jamie | Laurence | Wendy | Round Total (out of 30) |
| Lisa & Andy | Master bedroom, Bathroom & CJ and Jade's Room | 8 | 8 | 9 | 25 |
| Shayn & Carly | Entry, Hallway & Laundry ^{7a} | 7 | 8 | 8 | 23 |
| Pete & Courtney | Loungeroom, Ensuite & Balcony | 7 | 9 | 7 | 23 |
| Tim & Mat | Dining Room, Lily's Room, Family Storage & Bonus Room | 6 | 5 | 6 | 22 (17 + 5)^{7b} |
| Katie & Alex | Kitchen & Skye's Room | 6 | 6 | 7 | 19 |

Notes

- ^7 Due to winning the interior round phase, Tim & Mat were given two advantages during this round:
  - ^7a They were given the choice to swap their zone with another team if they weren’t satisfied with their own. They decided to swap their zone and choose Shayn & Carly’s Zone to swap with them.
  - ^7b They were given the power of the bonus room to keep it or give it to another team, they decided to keep it. The bonus room was a Family Room. Given 2 passes out of 3 from the judges it as a pass and the team gained 5 points, meaning their score of 17 rose to 22 taking them from last place to 4th place.

=== Phase 4: Gardens & Exteriors ===
The top 4 teams are challenged to transform the exteriors and gardens of each other's homes. Three teams are allocated to a home (that do not belong to them) and must renovate a zoned area in the gardens, as well as improving the house exterior. They are held over four rounds, covering all houses of the current teams. After the rounds are complete, the lowest scoring team is eliminated.

==== Round 1 ====
- Episodes 30 to 32
- Airdate — 24 to 30 June
- Description — In round 1 of the exterior renovations, three of the remaining teams head to Lisa & Andy’s home in Adelaide, South Australia to transform the backyard and house exterior in 4 Days. Teams are each allocated a zone in the gardens.
  - Golden Shovel winner's advantage: Tim & Mat — $5,000 & Fix Up Room^{8}

Renovation summary
Round 1
House Rules
| Rule 1 | Create a modern mediterranean paradise | | | | | | |
| Rule 2 | Use earthy materials | | | | | | |
| Rule 3 | Seduce into long lunches | | | | | | |
| Rule 4 | Stay together at all times | | | | | | |
| Rule 5 | Choose your zone | | | | | | |
| Team | Zone | Scores | | | | Total (out of 40) | Running Total (Round 1) |
| Team | Zone | Homeowners | Jamie | Laurence | Wendy | Total (out of 40) | Running Total (Round 1) |
| Tim & Mat | Entertainment Area | 9 | 9 | 9 | 9 | 36 | 36 / 40 |
| Shayn & Carly | Outdoor lounge | 8 | 6 | 8 | 7 | 29 | 29 / 40 |
| Pete & Courtney | Alfresco Kitchen & Fix Up Room^{8} | 7 | 5 | 5 | 5 | 25 (22 + 3)^{8} | 25 / 40 |
| Lisa & Andy | — | | | | | | — |

Notes

- ^8 They were given the power of the fix up room to keep it or give it to another team, they decided to give it to Pete & Courtney. The fix up room was the Den. Given 3 passes out of 3 from the judges it was as a pass and the team gained 3 points, meaning their score of 22 rose to 25 however did not change position of place.

==== Round 2 ====
- Episodes 33 to 35
- Airdate — 1 to 7 July
- Description — In round 2 of the exterior renovations, three of the remaining teams head to Tim & Mat’s home in Melbourne, Victoria to transform the front & backyard and house exterior in 4 Days. Teams are each allocated a zone in the gardens.
  - Golden Shovel winner's advantage: Pete & Courtney — $5,000 & Fix Up Room^{9}

Renovation summary
Round 2
House Rules
| Rule 1 | Design a modern cottage garden out front | | | | | | |
| Rule 2 | Fuse formal with hip Melbourne out back | | | | | | |
| Rule 3 | Build a place to hang with mates | | | | | | |
| Rule 4 | Create a real surprise! | | | | | | |
| Rule 5 | Choose your zone | | | | | | |
| Team | Zone | Scores | | | | Total (out of 40) | Running Total (Round 1 & 2) |
| Team | Zone | Homeowners | Jamie | Laurence | Wendy | Total (out of 40) | Running Total (Round 1 & 2) |
| Pete & Courtney | Front Garden | 9 | 8 | 9 | 9 | 35 | 60 / 80 |
| Shayn & Carly | Dining & Play Area | 8 | 7 | 8 | 8 | 31 | 60 / 80 |
| Lisa & Andy | Outdoor Lounge & Fix Up Room^{9} | 5 | 8 | 8 | 6 | 30 (27 + 3)^{9} | 30 / 40 |
| Tim & Mat | — | | | | | | 36 / 40 |

Notes

- ^9 They were given the power of the fix up room, they could not keep it and had to give it to another team, they decided to give it to Lisa & Andy. The fix up room was the Master Bedroom. Given 2 passes out of 3 from the judges it was as a pass and the team gained 3 points, meaning their score of 27 rose to 30 however did not change position of place.

==== Round 3 ====
- Episodes 36 to 38
- Airdate — 8 to 14 July
- Description — In round 3 of the exterior renovations, three of the remaining teams head to Shayn & Carly’s home in Aroona, Queensland to transform house exterior in 4 Days. Teams are each allocated a zone in the gardens.
  - Golden Shovel winner's advantage: Lisa & Andy — $5,000 & Fix Up Room^{10}

Renovation summary
Round 3
House Rules
| Rule 1 | Design the new Aussie dream garden | | | | | | |
| Rule 2 | Be inspired by our timber hallway | | | | | | |
| Rule 3 | Keep it simple, cool and stylish | | | | | | |
| Rule 4 | Make a secret fairy garden for the girls | | | | | | |
| Rule 5 | Choose your zone | | | | | | |
| Team | Zone | Scores | | | | Total (out of 40) | Running Total (Round 1 to 3) |
| Team | Zone | Homeowners | Jamie | Laurence | Wendy | Total (out of 40) | Running Total (Round 1 to 3) |
| Lisa & Andy | Backyard | 10 | 8 | 9 | 9 | 36 | 66 / 80 |
| Pete & Courtney | Front Garden | 8 | 8 | 10 | 7 | 33 | 93 / 120 |
| Tim & Mat | Outdoor Kitchen and Patio & Fix Up Room^{10} | 5 | 7 | 7 | 6 | 28 (25 + 3)^{10} | 64 / 80 |
| Shayn & Carly | — | | | | | | 60 / 80 |

Notes

- ^10 They were given the power of the fix up room, they could not keep it and had to give it to another team, they decided to give it to Tim & Mat. The fix up room was the Harper’s Bedroom. Given 2 passes out of 3 from the judges it was as a pass and the team gained 3 points, meaning their score of 25 rose to 28 however it did not change position of place.

==== Round 4 ====
- Episodes 39 to 41
- Airdate — 15 to 21 July
- Description — In round 4 of the exterior renovations, three of the remaining teams head to Pete & Courtney’s home in Ferntree Gully, Victoria to transform house exterior in 4 Days. Teams are each allocated a zone in the gardens. The lowest scoring team overall will be eliminated.
  - Golden Shovel winner's advantage: Lisa & Andy — $5,000 & Fix Up Room^{11}

Renovation summary
Round 4
House Rules
| Rule 1 | Make arriving an event | | | | | | |
| Rule 2 | Design a ‘party central’ deck | | | | | | |
| Rule 3 | Give every zone something 'extra' | | | | | | |
| Rule 4 | Turn heartbreak hill into a native paradise | | | | | | |
| Rule 5 | Choose your zone | | | | | | |
| Team | Zone | Scores | | | | Total (out of 40) | Final Total (Round 1 to 4) |
| Team | Zone | Homeowners | Jamie | Laurence | Wendy | Total (out of 40) | Final Total (Round 1 to 4) |
| Tim & Mat | Front Garden and left side of the deck | 10 | 10 | 10 | 10 | 40 | 1st (104) |
| Pete & Courtney | — | | | | | | 2nd (93) |
| Lisa & Andy | Street front and Carport | 6 | 6 | 6 | 7 | 25 | 3rd (91) |
| Shayn & Carly | Courtyard, right side of the deck & Fix Up Room^{11} | 3 | 5 | 7 | 7 | 25 (22 + 3)^{11} | 4th (85) |

Notes

- ^11 They were given the power of the fix up room, they could either keep it or could give it to another team, they decided to give it to Shayn & Carly. The fix up room was the Master Bedroom. Given 3 passes out of 3 from the judges it was as a pass and the team gained 3 points, meaning their score of 22 rose to 25 and moved them from last place to equal 2nd position.

=== Grand Final ===
- Episode 42 & 43
- Airdate — 22 & 23 July
- Description — For the first time in House Rules history, 3 teams have 7 days to renovate a loft apartment. The team that receives the highest score won the season (thus becoming House Rules 2019 Champion) and received $250,000.

Renovation summary
Grand Final
House Rules
| Rule 1 | Create the ultimate luxury loft | | | | | |
| Rule 2 | Master a relaxed, sophisticated style | | | | | |
| Rule 3 | Unite with muted tertiary colours | | | | | |
| Rule 4 | Use surprising textures | | | | | |
| Rule 5 | Amaze by re-inventing the conventional | | | | | |
| Team | Zone | Scores | | | Total (out of 30) | Final Result |
| Team | Zone | Jamie | Laurence | Wendy | Total (out of 30) | Final Result |
| Pete & Courtney | Ensuite 1, Walkway, Dining Room, Master Bedroom & Laundry | 9 | 10 | 10 | 29 | Winners |
| Tim & Mat | Deck, Kitchen, WIR, Guest Bedroom 1, Study & Ensuite 2 | 10 | 8 | 9 | 27 | Runners-up |
| Lisa & Andy | Breakfast Room, Bathroom, Loungeroom, Master Retreat, Lobby & Guest Bedroom 2 | 9 | 9 | 8 | 26 | Third Place |

== Ratings ==
Colour key:
– Highest number of viewers/nightly rank during the season
– Lowest number of viewers/nightly rank during the season

| Wk. | Ep no. | Episode titles by stage of season | | | | Air date | Viewers (millions)^{[a]} | Nightly rank^{[a]} | Source |
|---|---|---|---|---|---|---|---|---|---|
| 1 | 1 | Phase 1: Warehouse Apartment | | Introduction | | Sunday, 28 April | 0.782 | 6 | |
| 1 | 2 | Phase 1: Warehouse Apartment | | Apartment Reveal | | Monday, 29 April | 0.561 | 11 | |
| 2 | 3 | Phase 2: Interior Renovation | VIC Renovation (Pete & Courtney) | Introduction | | Tuesday, 30 April | 0.550 | 13 | |
| 2 | 4 | Phase 2: Interior Renovation | VIC Renovation (Pete & Courtney) | Renovation Continues | | Wednesday, 1 May | 0.589 | 14 | |
| 2 | 5 | Phase 2: Interior Renovation | VIC Renovation (Pete & Courtney) | House Reveal | Judges Scores | Sunday, 5 May | 0.684 | 6 | |
| 2 | 6 | Phase 2: Interior Renovation | VIC Renovation (Pete & Courtney) | House Reveal | Homeowners Scores | Monday, 6 May | 0.640 | 10 | |
| 3 | 7 | Phase 2: Interior Renovation | SA Renovation (Lisa & Andy) | Introduction | | Tuesday, 7 May | 0.534 | 13 | |
| 3 | 8 | Phase 2: Interior Renovation | SA Renovation (Lisa & Andy) | Renovation Continues | | Wednesday, 8 May | 0.586 | 12 | |
| 3 | 9 | Phase 2: Interior Renovation | SA Renovation (Lisa & Andy) | House Reveal | Judges Scores | Sunday, 12 May | 0.704 | 4 | |
| 3 | 10 | Phase 2: Interior Renovation | SA Renovation (Lisa & Andy) | House Reveal | Homeowners Scores | Monday, 13 May | 0.669 | 10 | |
| 4 | 11 | Phase 2: Interior Renovation | WA Renovation (Mikaela & Eliza) | Introduction | | Tuesday, 14 May | 0.533 | 14 | |
| 4 | 12 | Phase 2: Interior Renovation | WA Renovation (Mikaela & Eliza) | Renovation Continues | | Wednesday, 15 May | 0.597 | 11 | |
| 4 | 13 | Phase 2: Interior Renovation | WA Renovation (Mikaela & Eliza) | House Reveal | Judges Scores | Sunday, 19 May | 0.790 | 4 | |
| 4 | 14 | Phase 2: Interior Renovation | WA Renovation (Mikaela & Eliza) | House Reveal | Homeowners Scores | Monday, 20 May | 0.668 | 11 | |
| 5 | 15 | Phase 2: Interior Renovation | VIC Renovation (Tim & Mat) | Introduction | | Tuesday, 21 May | 0.556 | 11 | |
| 5 | 16 | Phase 2: Interior Renovation | VIC Renovation (Tim & Mat) | Renovation Continues | | Wednesday, 22 May | 0.573 | 12 | |
| 5 | 17 | Phase 2: Interior Renovation | VIC Renovation (Tim & Mat) | House Reveal | Judges Scores | Sunday, 26 May | 0.740 | 5 | |
| 5 | 18 | Phase 2: Interior Renovation | VIC Renovation (Tim & Mat) | House Reveal | Homeowners Scores | Monday, 27 May | 0.735 | 10 | |
| 6 | 19 | Phase 2: Interior Renovation | QLD Renovation (Shayn & Carly) | Introduction | | Tuesday, 28 May | 0.544 | 13 | |
| 6 | 20 | Phase 2: Interior Renovation | QLD Renovation (Shayn & Carly) | Renovation Continues | | Wednesday, 29 May | 0.613 | 10 | |
| 6 | 21 | Phase 2: Interior Renovation | QLD Renovation (Shayn & Carly) | House Reveal | Judges Scores | Sunday, 2 June | 0.805 | 4 | |
| 6 | 22 | Phase 2: Interior Renovation | QLD Renovation (Shayn & Carly) | House Reveal | Homeowners Scores | Monday, 3 June | 0.743 | 9 | |
| 7 | 23 | Phase 2: Interior Renovation | NSW Renovation (Katie & Alex) | Introduction | | Tuesday, 4 June | 0.611 | 11 | |
| 7 | 24 | Phase 2: Interior Renovation | NSW Renovation (Katie & Alex) | Renovation Continues | | Wednesday, 5 June | 0.532 | 14 | |
| 7 | 25 | Phase 2: Interior Renovation | NSW Renovation (Katie & Alex) | House Reveal | Judges Scores | Sunday, 9 June | 0.679 | 4 | |
| 7 | 26 | Phase 2: Interior Renovation | NSW Renovation (Katie & Alex) | House Reveal | Homeowners Scores & Elimination | Monday, 10 June | 0.761 | 7 | |
| 8 | 27 | Phase 3: Give Back House | | Introduction | | Sunday, 16 June | 0.723 | 4 | |
| 8 | 28 | Phase 3: Give Back House | | Renovation Continues | | Monday, 17 June | 0.626 | 13 | |
| 8 | 29 | Phase 3: Give Back House | | House Reveal & Elimination | | Sunday, 23 June | 0.743 | 6 | |
| 9 | 30 | Phase 4: Gardens & Exteriors | Round 1 (Lisa & Andy) | Introduction | | Monday, 24 June | 0.591 | 14 | |
| 9 | 31 | Phase 4: Gardens & Exteriors | Round 1 (Lisa & Andy) | Renovation Continues | | Tuesday, 25 June | 0.584 | 10 | |
| 9 | 32 | Phase 4: Gardens & Exteriors | Round 1 (Lisa & Andy) | Exterior Reveal | | Sunday, 30 June | 0.720 | 5 | |
| 10 | 33 | Phase 4: Gardens & Exteriors | Round 2 (Tim & Mat) | Introduction | | Monday, 1 July | 0.549 | 16 | |
| 10 | 34 | Phase 4: Gardens & Exteriors | Round 2 (Tim & Mat) | Renovation Continues | | Tuesday, 2 July | 0.563 | 12 | |
| 10 | 35 | Phase 4: Gardens & Exteriors | Round 2 (Tim & Mat) | Exterior Reveal | | Sunday, 7 July | 0.694 | 4 | |
| 11 | 36 | Phase 4: Gardens & Exteriors | Round 3 (Shayn & Carly) | Introduction | | Monday, 8 July | 0.543 | 14 | |
| 11 | 37 | Phase 4: Gardens & Exteriors | Round 3 (Shayn & Carly) | Renovation Continues | | Tuesday, 9 July | 0.552 | 11 | |
| 11 | 38 | Phase 4: Gardens & Exteriors | Round 3 (Shayn & Carly) | Exterior Reveal | | Sunday, 14 July | 0.732 | 4 | |
| 12 | 39 | Phase 4: Gardens & Exteriors | Round 4 (Pete & Courtney) | Introduction | | Monday, 15 July | 0.590 | 14 | |
| 12 | 40 | Phase 4: Gardens & Exteriors | Round 4 (Pete & Courtney) | Renovation Continues | | Tuesday, 16 July | 0.609 | 11 | |
| 12 | 41 | Phase 4: Gardens & Exteriors | Round 4 (Pete & Courtney) | Exterior Reveal & Elimination | | Sunday, 21 July | 0.784 | 4 | |
| 13 | 42 | Grand Final | | Final Renovation | | Monday, 22 July | 0.644 | 12 | |
| 13 | 43 | Grand Final | | Judging & Winner Announced | | Tuesday, 23 July | 0.730 | 9 | |

| Episode | | Air date | Viewers (millions)^{[a]} | Nightly rank^{[a]} | Source |
|---|---|---|---|---|---|
| Special | House Rules: Top 10 Makeovers | Tuesday, 18 June | 0.468 | 15 | |

== Notes ==
- ^{a} Ratings data used is from OzTAM and represents the live and same day average viewership from the 5 largest Australian metropolitan centres (Sydney, Melbourne, Brisbane, Perth and Adelaide).
