= Jared Petrenko =

Australian rules footballer (born 1989)

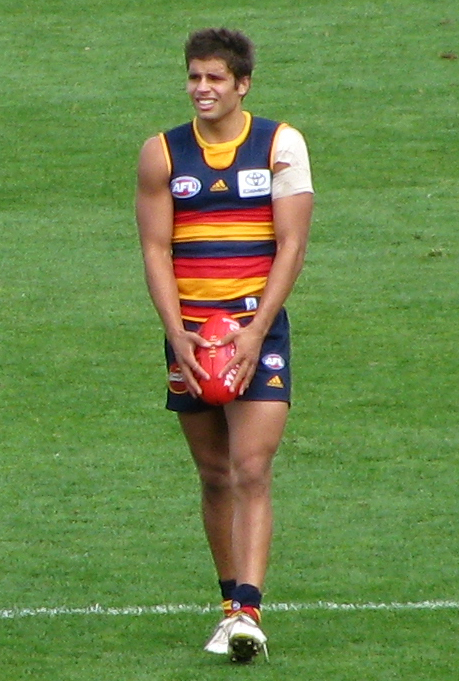

Personal information
- Full name: Jared Petrenko
- Born: 22 December 1989 (age 36); South Australia, Australia
- Original team: Woodville-West Torrens (SANFL)
- Draft: No. 25, 2008 Rookie Draft
- Height: 178 cm (5 ft 10 in)
- Weight: 81 kg (179 lb)
- Position: Midfielder / Forward
- Other occupation: Coordinator (APY)

Playing career^{1}
Years	Club	Games (Goals)
2008–2014	Adelaide	76 (50)
2015	Essendon	0 (0)
- ^{1} Playing statistics correct to the end of 2014.

Jared Petrenko (born 22 December 1989) is a former professional Australian rules footballer who played for the Adelaide Football Club in the Australian Football League (AFL) from 2008 to 2014. He currently plays for the Port Douglas Crocs of AFL Cairns.

== Career ==
He played football for the Woodville-West Torrens Football Club in the SANFL before being drafted to the Crows with the 25th selection in the 2007 Rookie Draft.

After being elevated from the rookie list and being named as an emergency towards the end of 2008, Petrenko was elevated to the senior list permanently for the next season and made his AFL debut against Collingwood in round 1. He was in and out of the senior team during the season, impressing with his pace and ferocious tackling.

Despite growing up in South Australia, Petrenko was a passionate St. Kilda supporter and was hopeful of being drafted by the Saints before ultimately being chosen by the Crows.

Petrenko was delisted at the conclusion of the 2014 AFL season.

In February 2015, Petrenko was given a short-term contract by Essendon to play in the 2015 NAB Challenge as a "top-up" player, due to 26 Essendon players withdrawing from the NAB Challenge because of the ongoing Essendon Football Club supplements controversy.

== Personal life ==
In 1992, Petrenko moved to Seaford, South Australia. Petrenko grew up in Henley Beach, South Australia, attending Henley High School and supporting the St Kilda Football Club.

Petrenko is of Indigenous Australian and Ukrainian descent. His Indigenous tribal ancestry can be traced to the Adnyamathanha.

Petrenko has a son called Seb with his long-term partner Jessica Dover, with whom he appeared on series 6 of the renovation TV show House Rules. They announced their split in 2021.
