= House Rules season 8 =

Australian reality television series

House Rules
- Season 8
- Promotional title card for House Rules: High Stakes
- No. of episodes: 30

Release
- Original network: Seven Network
- Original release: 6 April 2020

Season chronology
- ← Previous; Season 7

The eighth season of Australian reality television series House Rules, also known as House Rules: High Stakes, began airing on 6 April 2020. The series is produced by the team who created the Seven reality show My Kitchen Rules. This season was hosted by former judge Jamie Durie and Abbey Way.

Applications for Season 8 opened early in November 2018 and was confirmed in the seventh seasons grand final on the House Rules official network seven website. In July 2019, after seven seasons, Johanna Griggs announced she would not be returning as series host. In September 2019, Wendy Moore announced she would not be returning as series judge.

On 23 October 2019, the series was officially renewed for an eighth season titled "House Rules: High Stakes". For the first time, the season will feature eight teams. The announcement also introduced two new judges: interior designer Kyly Clarke and home builder Saul Myers, Laurence Llewelyn-Bowen will return as a judge, while Jamie Durie will take over as the new host, joined by new co-host Abbey Gelmi.[7][8]

It was announced in October 2020 that this would be the last season.

This season of House Rules consisted of new teams renovating each other's homes and further challenges for an ultimate prize of $100,000.

== Format changes ==
- Elimination rounds – This season will begin with eight teams. However, over two rounds, two teams will be eliminated. Each round will consist of renovating one half of a Gold Coast penthouse per round. The lowest scoring team from each round will be eliminated, whilst the other six will receive a spot in the competition.
- Interior renovations:
  - Team scoring – For the first time during the interior renovation rounds, each team will also score each other's rooms, which will be combined into the average score from all teams.
  - Elimination – This is the first season to have a double elimination during interior renovations.
  - Round winners – The team who scores the highest after each house renovation receives $10,000 to keep personally.

Interior renovation rounds	Winning team	Round prize
1	Kimmy & Rhi	$10,000
2	Kimmy & Rhi	$10,000
3	Kayne & Aimee	$10,000
4	Laith & George	$10,000
5	Kimmy & Rhi	$10,000
6	Kayne & Aimee	$10,000

- Exterior renovations - For the first time, this season will not include any exterior or gardens renovations.
- Grand final - for the first time, not the two but four remaining teams will fight it out in the grand final.

== Contestant teams ==
Team		Ages	House	Relationship	Status
1	Kimmy & Rhi Harris	Both 31	Launceston, TAS	Twin sisters	Winners
2	Kayne & Aimee Stanton	37 & 26	Cranbourne, VIC	Plumber couple	Runners-up
3	Laith Abu-Ali & George Batarseh	29 & 30	Sydney, NSW	Best mates	Third place
4	Tamara Grant & Rhys Bennett	28 & 29	Brisbane, QLD	Lawyer & fitness pro (couple)	Fourth Place
5	Lenore McDermid & Bradley McLennan	55 & 31	Greystanes, NSW	Mother & son	Eliminated (interior renovation)
6	Tanya & Dave Dawes	38 & 36	Perth, WA	Married with children	Eliminated (interior renovation)
7	Susan & Anthony Lobriza	31 & 27	Berwick, VIC	Married cheerleaders	Eliminated (elimination round 2)
DQ	Carly & Andrew	38 & 46	Brisbane, QLD	Married straight shooters	Withdrew (elimination round 1)

== Elimination history ==
Teams' progress through the competition
Phase:	Elimination Rounds			Interior Renovation							Grand Final	
Phase:	Round 1	Round 2	Round Total (out of 60)	VIC	NSW	WA	QLD	NSW	TAS	Final Total (out of 250)	Final Total (out of 30)	Final Total Result
Team	Scores		Round Total (out of 60)	Scores						Final Total (out of 250)	Final Total (out of 30)	Final Total Result
Kimmy & Rhi	25	23	1st (48)	41	46	33	41	46	—N/a	1st (207)	27	Winners
Kayne & Aimee	21	19	4th (40)	—N/a	43	39	34	39	43	2nd (198)	26	Runners-Up
Laith & George	21	24	2nd (45)	39	—N/a	35	41	40	39	3rd (194)	25	Third Place
Tamara & Rhys	17	21	5th (38)	40	33	34	—N/a	44	40	4th (191)	24	Fourth place
Lenore & Bradley	22	21	3rd (43)	39	42	31	39	—N/a	38	5th (189)	Eliminated (Episode 27)	
Tanya & Dave	26	→		34	37	—N/a	38	42	35	6th (186)	Eliminated (Episode 27)	
Susan & Anthony	15	19	6th (34)	Eliminated (Episode 6)								
Carly & Andrew	Withdrew (Episode 2)											

== Competition details ==
=== Elimination rounds: Gold Coast penthouse ===
==== Round 1 ====
- Episode 1 to 3
- Airdate — 6 to 8 April
- Description — In the first of two eliminations challenges, the teams had to renovate a zone in the first half of a 1970s Gold Coast penthouse within 7 days. It was intended that the losing team in this challenge would be eliminated, but due to a team withdrawing from the competition during this round, there will be no elimination after the round is complete, however the highest scoring team will be fast tracked to the interior renovations.

Renovation summary
Round 1
House Rules
Rule 1	Create a Miami Beach penthouse					
Rule 2	Embrace the sexy curves and views					
Rule 3	Impress with gelato colours					
Rule 4	Size matters in the kitchen					
Rule 5	Add luxury and glamour in master suite					
Team	Zone	Scores			Round Total (out of 30)	Running Total (Round 1)
Team	Zone	Kyly	Laurence	Saul	Round Total (out of 30)	Running Total (Round 1)
Tanya & Dave	Dining Room & Shower Room	9	8	9	26	through to IR
Kimmy & Rhi	Loungeroom & WIR - His	8	8	9	25	25 / 30
Lenore & Bradley	Pool & WIR - Hers	7	7	8	22	22 / 30
Laith & George	Ensuite, Master Retreat & Master Bedroom^{1a}	7	7	7	21	21 / 30
Kayne & Aimee	Family Room, Hallway & Open Study^{1b}	6	5	5	21 (16 + 5)	21 / 30
Tamara & Rhys	Kitchen & Pool Lounge	5	6	6	17	17 / 30
Susan & Anthony	Bar & Entry	5	6	4	15	15 / 30
Carly & Andrew^{1}	Withdrew					

Notes

- ^1Due to Carly & Andrew withdrawing from the competition, their two rooms had to be given to two teams, one room each, these rooms would now count as pass/fail rooms, if they pass the team receives 5 points, if they fail they receive nothing. The teams are:
  - ^1aLaith & George decided to take on the Master Bedroom. The room was judged as a fail and they did not receive 5 extra points.
  - ^1bKayne & Aimee decided to take on the Open Study. The room was judged as a pass and they did receive 5 extra points.

==== Round 2 ====
- Episode 4 to 6
- Airdate — 9 to 13 April
- Description — In the second of two eliminations challenges, the teams had to renovate a zone in The second half of a 1970s Gold Coast Penthouse within 7 days. The lowest scoring team at the end of this round will be eliminated.
  - previous winner's advantage: Tanya & Dave — fast tracked to interior renovation rounds
  - previous runners-up advantage: Kimmy & Rhi — allocating the zones to the teams

Renovation summary
Round 2
House Rules
Rule 1	Create a Miami Beach penthouse					
Rule 2	Embrace the sexy curves and views					
Rule 3	Impress with gelato colours					
Rule 4	Entertain upstairs with lavish style					
Rule 5	Give each bedroom a different identity					
Team	Zone	Scores			Round Total (out of 30)	Final Total (Round 1 & 2)
Team	Zone	Kyly	Laurence	Saul	Round Total (out of 30)	Final Total (Round 1 & 2)
Kimmy & Rhi	Bedroom 3 & WIR	8	7	8	23	1st (48)
Laith & George	Bar, Study Nook & Bathroom 1	9	7	8	24	2nd (45)
Lenore & Bradley	Stairs, Hallway & Laundry	8	6	7	21	3rd (43)
Kayne & Aimee	Pool View Lounge & Bedroom 2	6	7	6	19	4th (40)
Tamara & Rhys	Bedroom 1 & Bathroom 2	7	8	6	21	5th (38)
Susan & Anthony	Cocktail Lounge & Ensuite	6	7	6	19	6th (34)
Tanya & Dave	Through to interior renovations					

=== Interior Renovation ===
The six teams traveled around the country to completely renovate each other's home. Every week, one team handed over their house to their opponents for a complete interior transformation. A set of rules from the owners were given to the teams known as the 'House Rules' which needed to be followed to gain high scores from the judges and the homeowner team.

==== Victoria: Kayne & Aimee ====
- Episodes 7 to 9
- Airdate — 14 to 20 April
- Description — Teams headed to Kayne & Aimee's home in Cranbourne, Victoria for the first renovation. The highest scoring team will receive $10,000 to keep personally.

Renovation 1
Cranbourne, Victoria
House Rules
Rule 1	Create a light-filled modern, eco ranch							
Rule 2	Embrace texture, up cycling and wood							
Rule 3	Be soft and subtle with colours							
Rule 4	Think inside out with the bathroom							
Rule 5	Bring relaxation and the rainforest into our master							
Team	Zone	Scores					Total (out of 50)	Running Total (Reno 1)
Team	Zone	Homeowner	Kyly	Laurence	Saul	Teams	Total (out of 50)	Running Total (Reno 1)
Kimmy & Rhi	Entry, Dining Room & Ensuite	8	9	8	8	8	41	41 / 50
Tamara & Rhys	Bathroom & Study	10	8	7	7	8	40	40 / 50
Laith & George	Master Bedroom & Laundry	9	8	7	7	8	39	39 / 50
Lenore & Bradley	Kitchen & Bedroom 2	9	7	7	8	8	39	39 / 50
Tanya & Dave	Loungeroom, WIR & Entry Hall	8	7	6	6	7	34	34 / 50
Kayne & Aimee	—N/a							—

==== New South Wales: Laith & George ====
- Episodes 10 to 12
- Airdate — 21 to 27 April
- Description — Teams headed to Laith & George's home in Sydney, New South Wales for the second renovation. The highest scoring team will receive $10,000 to keep personally.
  - previous winner's advantage: Kimmy & Rhi — allocating the zones to the teams
  - Previous loser's disadvantage: Tanya & Dave — Camping in a tent during the renovation.

Renovation 2
Sydney, New South Wales
House Rules
Rule 1	Create a suave & sophisticated masculine home							
Rule 2	Style with deep, heritage colours							
Rule 3	We'll be looking for the finer details and quality craftsmanship							
Rule 4	Give us a VIP lounge fit for gentlemen...like us							
Rule 5	Open up, for family gatherings							
Team	Zone	Scores					Total (out of 50)	Running Total (Reno 1 & 2)
Team	Zone	Homeowner	Kyly	Laurence	Saul	Teams	Total (out of 50)	Running Total (Reno 1 & 2)
Kimmy & Rhi	Kitchen & VIP Lounge	10	9	9	9	9	46	87 / 100
Kayne & Aimee	Bathroom, Dining Room & Guest Bedroom	9	9	8	9	8	43	43 / 50
Lenore & Bradley	Living Room, George's Study & Ensuite	8	9	9	8	8	42	81 / 100
Tanya & Dave	Entry, Hallway & Master Bedroom	7	8	7	8	7	37	71 / 100
Tamara & Rhys	Bedroom 2, Laith's Study & Laundry	7	7	6	6	7	33	73 / 100
Laith & George	—N/a							39 / 50

==== Western Australia: Tanya & Dave ====
- Episodes 13 to 15
- Airdate — 28 April to 4 May
- Description — Teams headed to Tanya & Dave's 's home in Perth, Western Australia for the third renovation. The highest scoring team will receive $10,000 to keep personally. Three of the bedrooms belong to their children; Luke, eight years old; Ben, six years old and Emily, four years old.
  - previous winner's advantage: Kimmy & Rhi — allocating the zones to the teams
  - Previous loser's disadvantage: Tamara & Rhys — Camping in a tent during the renovation.

Renovation 3
Perth, Western Australia
House Rules
Rule 1	Give us a natural, coastal, family home							
Rule 2	Storage solutions for the whole family							
Rule 3	Layer and texture with rattan and cane							
Rule 4	Deliver with refined use of whites and dusty tones							
Rule 5	We'd love a break from the kids upstairs							
Team	Zone	Scores					Total (out of 50)	Running Total (Reno 1 to 3)
Team	Zone	Homeowner	Kyly	Laurence	Saul	Teams	Total (out of 50)	Running Total (Reno 1 to 3)
Kayne & Aimee	Ben's Bedroom, Powder Room, Loungeroom & WIR	9	8	7	7	8	39	82 / 100
Laith & George	Emily's Bedroom, Kitchen, Stairs & Landing	8	7	7	5	8	35	74 / 100
Tamara & Rhys	Hallway, Dining Room & Ensuite	7	7	7	6	7	34	107 / 150
Kimmy & Rhi	Master Bedroom, Mudroom & Bathroom	9	7	5	5	7	33	120 / 150
Lenore & Bradley	Laundry, Luke's Bedroom & Study	8	6	5	5	7	31	112 / 150
Tanya & Dave	—N/a							71 / 100

==== Queensland: Tamara & Rhys ====
- Episodes 16 to 19
- Airdate — 5 to 11 May
- Description — Teams headed to Tamara & Rhys's home in Brisbane, Queensland for the fourth renovation. The highest scoring team will receive $10,000 to keep personally.
  - previous winner's advantage: Kayne & Aimee — allocating the zones to the teams
  - Previous loser's disadvantage: Lenore & Bradley — Camping in a tent during the renovation.

Renovation 4
Brisbane, Queensland
House Rules
Rule 1	Design an integratrd, clutter free minimalist home							
Rule 2	We want sleek finishes and modern lines							
Rule 3	Pepper with jewel tones							
Rule 4	Deliver a wow in every room							
Rule 5	Give Rhys a paradise to pump iron							
Team	Zone	Scores					Total (out of 50)	Running Total (Reno 1 to 4)
Team	Zone	Homeowner	Kyly	Laurence	Saul	Teams	Total (out of 50)	Running Total (Reno 1 to 4)
Laith & George	Ensuite, Dining Room & Porch	8	8	8	9	8	41^{2}	115 / 150
Kimmy & Rhi	Living Room & Laundry	9	7	9	8	8	41	161 / 200
Lenore & Bradley	Master Bedroom & Bathroom	8	7	9	7	8	39	151 / 200
Tanya & Dave	Entry, Bedroom 2 & Gym	8	7	9	6	8	38	109 / 150
Kayne & Aimee	Hallway, Kitchen & Study	7	6	8	6	7	34	116 / 150
Tamara & Rhys	—N/a							107 / 150

Notes

- ^2Even though both Laith & George and Kimmy & Rhi received the same score, only one team could win this round, so the winner was decided by the scores given by the teams, Kimmy & Rhi received 8's from all teams however Laith & George received three 8's and a 9, meaning the 9 being the higher score they won this round.

==== New South Wales: Lenore & Bradley ====
- Episodes 20 to 23
- Airdate — 17 to 25 May
- Description — Teams headed to Lenore & Bradley's home in Greystanes, New South Wales for the fifth renovation. The highest scoring team will receive $10,000 to keep personally.
  - previous winner's advantage: Laith & George — allocating the zones to the teams
  - Previous loser's disadvantage: Kayne & Aimee — Camping in a tent during the renovation.

Renovation 5
Greystanes, New South Wales
House Rules
Rule 1	We would love a refreshed Hamptons home							
Rule 2	Open up with light and love							
Rule 3	Give us the blues							
Rule 4	Deliver elegance with contemporary, clean and crisp wet areas							
Rule 5	My grandson Aiden deserves a nursery fit for a prince							
Team	Zone	Scores					Total (out of 50)	Running Total (Reno 1 to 5)
Team	Zone	Homeowner	Kyly	Laurence	Saul	Teams	Total (out of 50)	Running Total (Reno 1 to 5)
Kimmy & Rhi	Loungeroom, Pantry & WIR	9	9	10	9	9	46	207 / 250
Tamara & Rhys	Nursery, Hallway & Ensuite	8	9	9	9	9	44	151 / 200
Tanya & Dave	Dining Room, Laundry & Bedroom 2	9	9	8	8	8	42	151 / 200
Laith & George	Master Bedroom & Kitchen	8	8	8	8	8	40	155 / 200
Kayne & Aimee	Entry, Bathroom & Den	8	8	8	7	8	39	155 / 200
Lenore & Bradley	—N/a							151 / 200

==== Tasmania: Kimmy & Rhi ====
- Episodes 24 to 27
- Airdate — 26 May to 1 June
- Description — Teams headed to Kimmy & Rhi's home in Launceston, Tasmania for the sixth and final interior renovation. The highest scoring team will receive $10,000 to keep personally. The two lowest scoring teams overall will be eliminated.
  - previous winner's advantage: Tamara & Rhys^{3} — allocating the zones to the teams
  - Previous loser's disadvantage: Kayne & Aimee — Camping in a tent during the renovation.

Renovation 6
Launceston, Tasmania
House Rules
Rule 1	Design an edgy, mid-century modern home for the Tassie Twins							
Rule 2	Don't be generic, think vintage cool							
Rule 3	Pack a punch with retro colours							
Rule 4	Present a plush pooch pad & playground							
Rule 5	We love to lounge and entertain, so be generous here							
Team	Zone	Scores					Total (out of 50)	Final Total (Reno 1 to 6)
Team	Zone	Homeowner	Kyly	Laurence	Saul	Teams	Total (out of 50)	Final Total (Reno 1 to 6)
Kimmy & Rhi	—N/a							1st (207)
Kayne & Aimee	Master Bedroom & Laundry	8	9	9	9	8	43	2nd (198)
Laith & George	Bathroom & Pooch Pad	8	8	7	8	8	39	3rd (194)
Tamara & Rhys	Kitchen & Guest Bedroom	8	8	8	8	8	40	4th (191)
Lenore & Bradley	Dining Room & Entry	8	8	7	7	8	38	5th (189)
Tanya & Dave	Living Room & Hallway	7	7	7	7	7	35	6th (186)

Notes

- ^3Although Kimmy & Rhi were the highest scoring team in the previous week, they do not participate in the renovation of their own home, therefore the allocation of team zones was given to the second-highest scoring team.

=== Grand Final ===
- Episode 28 to 30
- Airdate — 2 to 7 June
- Description — The four remaining teams will, for the first time in history, be renovating for charity. They have now been given only four days to construct a Nano-Homes freight house with no demolition required for a man named Lionel who has lost his home due to circumstances beyond his control. The winner at the end will be determined by points and will receive a grand prize of $100,000.
  - previous winner's advantage: Kimmy & Rhi — allocating their own zone

Renovation summary
Grand Final
House Rules
Rule 1	Be house proud and create a Zen inspired retreat					
Rule 2	Make sure small is perfectly formed					
Rule 3	Decorate with life’s stylish necessities					
Rule 4	Be sustainable, natural and neutral					
Rule 5	Be cheeky with the use of LLB’s wallpaper					
Team	Zone	Scores			Total (out of 30)	Final Result
Team	Zone	Kyly	Laurence	Saul	Total (out of 30)	Final Result
Kimmy & Rhi	Kitchen & Bedroom	9	9	9	27	Winners
Kayne & Aimee	Front Garden, WIR & Entry	8	9	9	26	Runners-Up
Laith & George	Bathroom, Laundry & Dining Room	8	8	9	25	Third Place
Tamara & Rhys	Verandah & Lounge Room	8	8	8	24	Fourth Place

== Ratings ==
Colour key:
– Highest number of viewers/nightly rank during the season
– Lowest number of viewers/nightly rank during the season

Wk.	Ep no.	Episode titles by stage of season				Air date	Viewers (millions)^{[a]}	Nightly rank^{[a]}	Source
1	1	Elimination Rounds (Gold Coast Penthouse)	Round 1	Introduction		Monday, 6 April	0.679	12	
1	1	Elimination Rounds (Gold Coast Penthouse)	Round 1	Renovation Continues		Monday, 6 April	0.660	13	
1	2	Elimination Rounds (Gold Coast Penthouse)	Round 1	Apartment Reveal: Part 1		Tuesday, 7 April	0.643	9	
1	3	Elimination Rounds (Gold Coast Penthouse)	Round 1	Apartment Reveal: Part 2		Wednesday, 8 April	0.620	11	
2	4	Elimination Rounds (Gold Coast Penthouse)	Round 2	Introduction & Renovation		Thursday, 9 April	0.478	12	
2	5	Elimination Rounds (Gold Coast Penthouse)	Round 2	Apartment Reveal: Part 1		Sunday, 12 April	0.630	6	
2	6	Elimination Rounds (Gold Coast Penthouse)	Round 2	Apartment Reveal: Part 2		Monday, 13 April	0.548	15	
3	7	Phase 1: Interior Renovation	VIC Renovation (Kayne & Aimee)	Introduction & Renovation		Tuesday, 14 April	0.499	15	
3	8	Phase 1: Interior Renovation	VIC Renovation (Kayne & Aimee)	House Reveal	Homeowners Scores	Sunday, 19 April	0.630	10	
3	9	Phase 1: Interior Renovation	VIC Renovation (Kayne & Aimee)	House Reveal	Judges Scores	Monday, 20 April	0.559	18	
4	10	Phase 1: Interior Renovation	NSW Renovation (Laith & George)	Introduction & Renovation		Tuesday, 21 April	0.502	17	
4	11	Phase 1: Interior Renovation	NSW Renovation (Laith & George)	House Reveal	Homeowners Scores	Sunday, 26 April	0.640	6	
4	12	Phase 1: Interior Renovation	NSW Renovation (Laith & George)	House Reveal	Judges Scores	Monday, 27 April	0.564	18	
5	13	Phase 1: Interior Renovation	WA Renovation (Tanya & Dave)	Introduction & Renovation		Tuesday, 28 April	0.479	14	
5	14	Phase 1: Interior Renovation	WA Renovation (Tanya & Dave)	House Reveal	Homeowners Scores	Sunday, 3 May	0.643	7	
5	15	Phase 1: Interior Renovation	WA Renovation (Tanya & Dave)	House Reveal	Judges Scores	Monday, 4 May	0.625	15	
6	16	Phase 1: Interior Renovation	QLD Renovation (Tamara & Rhys)	Introduction & Renovation		Tuesday, 5 May	0.532	13	
6	17	Phase 1: Interior Renovation	QLD Renovation (Tamara & Rhys)	Renovation Continues		Sunday, 10 May	0.641	8	
6	18	Phase 1: Interior Renovation	QLD Renovation (Tamara & Rhys)	House Reveal	Homeowners Scores	Sunday, 10 May	0.657	6	
6	19	Phase 1: Interior Renovation	QLD Renovation (Tamara & Rhys)	House Reveal	Judges Scores	Monday, 11 May	0.568	18	
7	20	Phase 1: Interior Renovation	NSW Renovation (Lenore & Bradley)	Introduction & Renovation		Sunday, 17 May	0.641	7	
7	21	Phase 1: Interior Renovation	NSW Renovation (Lenore & Bradley)	Renovation Continues		Monday, 18 May	0.565	19	
7	22	Phase 1: Interior Renovation	NSW Renovation (Lenore & Bradley)	House Reveal	Homeowners Scores	Sunday, 24 May	0.674	7	
7	23	Phase 1: Interior Renovation	NSW Renovation (Lenore & Bradley)	House Reveal	Judges Scores	Monday, 25 May	0.579	18	
8	24	Phase 1: Interior Renovation	TAS Renovation (Kimmy & Rhi)	Introduction & Renovation		Tuesday, 26 May	0.465	16	
8	25	Phase 1: Interior Renovation	TAS Renovation (Kimmy & Rhi)	Renovation Continues		Sunday, 31 May	0.605	7	
8	26	Phase 1: Interior Renovation	TAS Renovation (Kimmy & Rhi)	House Reveal	Homeowners Scores	Sunday, 31 May	0.597	8	
8	27	Phase 1: Interior Renovation	TAS Renovation (Kimmy & Rhi)	House Reveal	Judges Scores & Elimination	Monday, 1 June	0.597	17	
9	28	Grand Final		Introduction		Tuesday, 2 June	0.455	16	
9	29	Grand Final		Renovation Continues		Wednesday, 3 June	0.505	16	
9	30	Grand Final		Judging & Winner Announced		Sunday, 7 June	0.585	7	

== Notes ==
- ^{a} Ratings data used is from OzTAM and represents the live and same day average viewership from the 5 largest Australian metropolitan centres (Sydney, Melbourne, Brisbane, Perth and Adelaide).
