= House Rules season 6 =

House Rules
- Season 6
- No. of episodes: 46

Release
- Original network: Seven Network
- Original release: 7 May – 30 July 2018

Season chronology
- ← Previous; Season 5 Next → Season 7

The sixth season of the Australian reality television series House Rules began airing on 7 May 2018 and ended airing on 30 July 2018. The series was produced by the team who created the Seven reality show My Kitchen Rules and was hosted by Johanna Griggs.

Season 6 was confirmed in June 2017 with Applications for the sixth season of House Rules open between 3 June & 31 August 2017 on the House Rules official network seven website. Season 6 was officially confirmed in October 2017.

This season of House Rules consisted of new teams renovating each other's homes and further challenges for the ultimate prize of $355,000.

== Format Changes ==
Teams - This is the first season to include seven teams instead of the conventional six teams like in previous seasons.

Prize Money/Auction House - In a House Rules first, the first challenge of the competition was for the contestants to renovate a home which will be sold at auction, the profit that is made from the auction became the series prize money. The house was bought for $1.25 million and sold at auction for $1.605 million, which made the profit from the auction $355,000, which became the prize money for the winners of the season.

House Evaluation - After each interior renovation, a property expert from Purplebricks valued each teams houses, they told the team evaluation of the house before the renovation was complete and then give them a card with the new evaluation. In the grand final, the final two contestants were given a new evaluation after the renovation of their front yards.

Interior Renovation House Evaluation
Team	Evaluation		Added Value
Team	Before Renovation	After Renovation	Added Value
Jess & Jared	$570,000	$730,000	$160,000
Mel & Dave	$625,000	$825,000	$200,000
Josh & Brandon	$220,000	$350,000	$130,000
Kim & Michelle	$550,000	$700,000	$150,000
Leigh & Kristie	$540,000	$925,000	$385,000
Chiara & David	$435,000	$585,000	$150,000
Toad & Mandy	$850,000	$1,000,000	$150,000
Grand Finalists Evaluation
Toad & Mandy	$850,000	$1,100,000	$250,000
Mel & Dave	$625,000	$1,070,000	$445,000

Garden Rounds - The gardens rounds placed in the backyards of the homeowners yards and included six teams unlike previous seasons where it took place in the back and front yards and would only be four teams. It was also held over 3 rounds instead of two and for the first time the homeowners also scored the teams.

Give Back Makeover - Chelsea and Wayde applied into this series, but the latter died from a head injury that was initialised by a cliff fall. This round wa devoted to renovating Chelsea's house as an act of kindness. Even though their house would be renovated had Wayde not died, this format change is temporary (only for this season). The remaining teams did an interior renovation and got a score out of 10 from each of the judges. The lowest scoring team was eliminated and the 2 other teams headed into the final.

== Contestant Teams ==
This season of House Rules introduced seven new teams. All teams are from different states in Australia.

Place	Teams	Ages	House	Relationship	Status
1	Toad Heffernan & Mandy Stone	32 & 28	Candelo, New South Wales	Engaged Dairy Farmers	Winners
2	Mel & Dave Willmot	34 & 32	Hope Island, Queensland	Married Go-getters	Runners-up
3	Chiara & David Clarson	32 & 38	Yangebup, Western Australia	Married Hot-heads	Eliminated (Phase 3: Give Back Makeover)
4	Josh & Brandon Jarius	23 & 21	Maryborough, Queensland	Chippie Brothers	Eliminated (Phase 2: Backyards)
=5	Kim & Michelle	59 & 27	Tweed Heads, New South Wales	Mother & Daughter	Eliminated (Phase 2: Backyards)
=5	Jess Dover & Jared Petrenko	25 & 28	West Beach, South Australia	Dating 2 Years	Eliminated (Phase 2: Backyards)
7	Leigh & Kristie Treeby	33 & 36	Rye, Victoria	Competitive Couple	Eliminated (Phase 1: Interior Renovation)

== Elimination history ==
Teams' progress through the competition
Phase:	Auction House	Interior Renovation (Phase 2)								Backyards (Phase 3)				Phase 4	Grand Finale	
Phase:	Auction House	SA	QLD	QLD	NSW	VIC	WA	NSW	Final Total (out of 270)	Round 1	Round 2	Round 3	Final Total (out of 80)	Give Back Makeover	Front Yard	
Team	Scores								Final Total (out of 270)	Scores			Final Total (out of 80)	Total (out of 30)	Total (out of 30)	Final Result
Toad & Mandy	22	24	28	26	32	31	35	—N/a	2nd (198)	25	—N/a	38	2nd (63)	2nd (24)	24	Winners
Mel & Dave	18	23	—N/a	20	32	38	31	39	1st (201)	—N/a	30	34	1st (64)	1st (29)	23	Runners-Up
Chiara & David	24	22	18	30	38	29	—N/a	30	=3rd (191)	27	—N/a	35	3rd (62)	3rd (20)	Eliminated (Episode 45)	
Josh & Brandon	20	28	25	—N/a	26	35	30	26	5th (190)	—N/a	31	26	4th (57)	Eliminated (Episode 42)		
Jess & Jared	23	—N/a	25	25	27	31	25	35	=3rd (191)	23	28	—N/a	=5th (51)	Eliminated (Episode 42)		
Kim & Michelle	23	22	29	24	—N/a	25	24	30	6th (177)	28	23	—N/a	=5th (51)	Eliminated (Episode 42)		
Leigh & Kristie	21	21	24	27	32	—N/a	23	25	7th (173)	Eliminated (Episode 30)						

== Competition Details ==
=== Phase 1: Auction House ===
- Episode 1 & 2
- Airdate — 7 & 8 May
- Description — In the first challenge, the teams had seven days to renovate a house which will be put up for auction. The house located in Rosebery, New South Wales was bought for $1.25 million, the profit made from the auction became the series prize money ($355 000). The teams had to follow the rules given by the judges.

Auction House
Rosebery, New South Wales
House Rules
Rule 1	Create contemporary luxury in a "cafe cool" home					
Rule 2	Let the Australian impressionists inspire your colour palette					
Rule 3	Pay homage to Florence Broadhurst in the master suite					
Rule 4	Use art to add colour and urban edginess					
Rule 5	Play with spaces					
Team	Zone	Scores			Total (out of 30)	Running Total (AH)
Team	Zone	Drew	Laurence	Wendy	Total (out of 30)	Running Total (AH)
Chiara & David	Bathroom & Backyard Left	7	9	8	24	24 / 30
Kim & Michelle	Entry, Ensuite & Lounge Room	7	8	8	23	23 / 30
Jess & Jared	Dining Room, 1st Floor Hallway & Laundry	7	8	8	23	23 / 30
Toad & Mandy	Kitchen & Master Bedroom	6	9	7	22	22 / 30
Leigh & Kristie	Front Facade & Nursery	6	8	7	21	21 / 30
Josh & Brandon	Bedroom 2, Hallway & Stairwell	8	7	5	20	20 / 30
Mel & Dave	Bedroom 3 & Backyard Right	5	7	6	18	18 / 30

=== Phase 2: Interior Renovation ===
The seven teams traveled around the country to completely renovate each other's home. Every week, one team handed over their house to their opponents for a complete interior transformation. A set of rules from the owners were given to the teams known as the 'House rules' which needed to be followed to gain high scores from the judges and the homeowner team.

==== South Australia: Jess & Jared ====
- Episodes 3 to 6
- Airdate — 9 to 14 May
- Description —Teams headed to Jess & Jared's home in Adelaide, South Australia for the first renovation.

Renovation 1
Adelaide, South Australia
House Rules
Rule 1	Bring NY to the burbs with warehouse style						
Rule 2	Colour with dark greens and pale pinks						
Rule 3	Find iconic b&w photography						
Rule 4	Do something different with feature walls in every room						
Rule 5	Flow timber and brick throughout						
Bonus Room Rule	Make an epic space for footy and films						
Team	Zone	Scores				Total (out of 40)	Running Total (AH + Reno 1)
Team	Zone	Homeowner	Drew	Laurence	Wendy	Total (out of 40)	Running Total (AH + Reno 1)
Josh & Brandon	Kitchen, Hallway & Bonus Room	8	5	4	6	28 (23 + 5)^{1}	48 / 70
Toad & Mandy	Dining Room & Ensuite	7	6	5	6	24	46 / 70
Mel & Dave	Bathroom & Guest Bedroom	9	5	3	6	23	41 / 70
Chiara & David	Entry & Master Bedroom	6	5	5	6	22	46 / 70
Kim & Michelle	Laundry & Beauty Room	8	5	4	5	22	45 / 70
Leigh & Kristie	Lounge Room & Walk-In-Robe	7	4	5	5	21	42 / 70
Jess & Jared	—N/a						23 / 30

Notes

*^1 Josh & Brandon received the bonus room and decided to keep it. The bonus room was a Movie Room. Jess & Jared judged it as a pass and the team gained 5 points, meaning their score of 23 rose to 28 taking them from 2nd place to 1st place.

==== Queensland: Mel & Dave ====
- Episodes 7 to 10
- Airdate — 15 to 21 May
- Description —Teams headed to Dave & Mel's home in Hope Island, Queensland for the second renovation. Two of the bedrooms belong to their children; Billy, three years old & Westin, five years old.
  - Previous winner's advantage: Josh & Brandon — Ability to allocate the bonus room to another team or keep it for themselves
  - Previous loser's disadvantage: Leigh & Kristie — Camping in a tent during the renovation.

Renovation 2
Hope Island, Queensland
House Rules
Rule 1	Transport us to The Hamptons						
Rule 2	Bring in blue with a twist of lemon						
Rule 3	Find a key vintage piece for every room						
Rule 4	Build in a handy dining nook						
Rule 5	Wrap our walls with wainscoting						
Bonus Room Rule	Give us a Cape Cod dining deck						
Team	Zone	Scores				Total (out of 40)	Running Total (AH + Reno 1 & 2)
Team	Zone	Homeowner	Drew	Laurence	Wendy	Total (out of 40)	Running Total (AH + Reno 1 & 2)
Kim & Michelle	Master Bedroom & Mud Room	9	7	5	8	29	74 / 110
Toad & Mandy	Kitchen, Westin's Bedroom & Bonus Room	6	6	4	7	28 (23 + 5)^{2}	74 / 110
Josh & Brandon	Entry, Sitting Room & Ensuite	8	5	6	6	25	73 / 110
Jess & Jared	Lounge Room & Powder Room	7	5	7	6	25	48 / 70
Leigh & Kristie	Main Bathroom & Billy's Bedroom	8	5	5	6	24	66 / 110
Chiara & David	Dining Room, Hallway & Laundry	4	5	4	5	18	64 / 110
Mel & Dave	—N/a						41 / 70

Notes

*^2 Josh & Brandon had the power of the bonus room to keep it or give it to another team, they decided to give it to Toad & Mandy. The bonus room was an Outdoor Dining Room. Mel & Dave judged it as a pass and the team gained 5 points, meaning their score of 23 rose to 28 taking them from 5th place to 2nd place.

==== Queensland: Josh & Brandon ====
- Episodes 11 to 14
- Airdate — 22 to 28 May
- Description —Teams headed to Josh & Brandon's home in Maryborough, Queensland for the third renovation.
  - Previous winner's advantage: Kim & Michelle — Ability to allocate the bonus room to another team or keep it for themselves
  - Previous loser's disadvantage: Chiara & David — Camping in a tent during the renovation.

Renovation 3
Maryborough, Queensland
House Rules
Rule 1	Have fun with the ultimate Aussie lads' pad						
Rule 2	Use blokey blues and oranges						
Rule 3	Create cool stuff inspired by our hobbies						
Rule 4	Give Josh a 'rap video' master suite						
Rule 5	Style Brandon's room 'modern bushman'						
Bonus Room Rule	Rock out!						
Team	Zone	Scores				Total (out of 40)	Running Total (AH + Reno 1 to 3)
Team	Zone	Homeowner	Drew	Laurence	Wendy	Total (out of 40)	Running Total (AH + Reno 1 to 3)
Chiara & David	Bathroom & Walk-In-Robe	7	8	7	8	30	94 / 150
Leigh & Kristie	Kitchen & Josh's Bedroom	8	6	5	8	27	93 / 150
Toad & Mandy	Bar & Study	7	7	6	6	26	100 / 150
Jess & Jared	Entry & Dining Room	6	7	5	7	25	73 / 110
Kim & Michelle	Ensuite & Brandon's Bedroom	7	5	5	7	24	98 / 150
Mel & Dave	Lounge Room, Pantry & Bonus Room	8	6	4	7	20 (25 - 5)^{3}	61 / 110
Josh & Brandon	—N/a						73 / 110

Notes

*^3 Kim & Michelle had the power of the bonus room to keep it or give it to another team, they decided to give it to Mel & Dave. The bonus room was a Music Room. Josh & Brandon judged it as a fail and the team lost 5 points, meaning their score of 25 dropped to 20 taking them from 5th place to last place.

==== New South Wales: Kim & Michelle ====
- Episodes 15 to 18
- Airdate — 29 May to 4 June
- Description —Teams headed to Kim & Michelle's home in Tweed Heads, New South Wales for the fourth renovation. One of the bedrooms belong to Kim and her husband (the master bedroom), one to Michelle, one to her sister Melissa, one to Michelle's children (daughters who are 7 and 6 - Bella and Aaliyah respectively), and one to Melissa's son (10 year old Corey).
  - Previous winner's advantage: Chiara & David — Ability to allocate the bonus room to another team or keep it for themselves
  - Previous loser's disadvantage: Mel & Dave — Camping in a tent during the renovation, however due to the high possibility of snakes they were able to book a hotel room for the week

Renovation 4
Tweed Heads, New South Wales
House Rules
Rule 1	Put some pizazz into a dream display home						
Rule 2	Give us 50 shades of grey and purple						
Rule 3	Go ooh la la with French Provincial style for Michelle						
Rule 4	Be bold and beautiful with a black kitchen						
Rule 5	Use marble and mint in the main bathroom						
Bonus Room Rule	Create the ultimate kids' club house						
Team	Zone	Scores				Total (out of 40)	Running Total (AH + Reno 1 to 4)
Team	Zone	Homeowner	Drew	Laurence	Wendy	Total (out of 40)	Running Total (AH + Reno 1 to 4)
Chiara & David	Kitchen, Girl's Bedroom, Hallway 1 & Bonus Room	10	7	9	7	38 (33 + 5)^{4}	132 / 190
Mel & Dave	Dining Room & Master Bedroom	8	7	9	8	34	93 / 150
Leigh & Kristie	Laundry & Michelle's Bedroom	10	7	7	8	32	125 / 190
Toad & Mandy	Entry, Lounge Room & Walk-In-Robe	9	7	8	8	32	132 / 190
Jess & Jared	Ensuite, Corey's Bedroom & Hallway 2	9	6	5	7	27	100 / 150
Josh & Brandon	Bathroom & Melissa's Bedroom	10	5	5	6	26	99 / 150
Kim & Michelle	—N/a						98 / 150

Notes

*^4 Chiara & David had the power of the bonus room to keep it or give it to another team, they decided to keep it. The bonus room was a Kids' Playroom. Kim & Michelle judged it as a pass and the team gained 5 points, meaning their score of 33 rose to 38 and came in first place.

==== Victoria: Leigh & Kristie ====
- Episodes 19 to 22
- Airdate — 5 to 11 June
- Description —Teams headed to Leigh & Kristie's home in Rye, Victoria for the fifth renovation. Two of the bedrooms belong to their children; Billie, four years old & Kobe, six years old.
  - Previous winner's advantage: Chiara & David — Ability to allocate the bonus room to another team or keep it for themselves
  - Previous loser's disadvantage: Josh & Brandon — Camping in a tent during the renovation.

Renovation 5
Rye, Victoria
House Rules
Rule 1	Chill out with "California Cool" style						
Rule 2	Get earthy with copper, timber, limestone and concrete						
Rule 3	Deck out the entry hall like a luxury yacht						
Rule 4	Be bright in the family bathroom and laundry						
Rule 5	Make the master suite a flowing coastal retreat						
Bonus Room Rule	Give us a luxe surfie crash pad						
Team	Zone	Scores				Total (out of 40)	Running Total (AH + Reno 1 to 5)
Team	Zone	Homeowner	Drew	Laurence	Wendy	Total (out of 40)	Running Total (AH + Reno 1 to 5)
Mel & Dave	Ensuite, Billie's Bedroom & Bonus Room	9	6	9	9	38 (33 + 5)^{5}	131 / 190
Josh & Brandon	Entry, Lounge Room & Powder Room	9	8	9	9	35	134 / 190
Toad & Mandy	Den & Laundry	9	7	7	8	31	163 / 230
Jess & Jared	Kitchen & Kobe's Bedroom	8	7	8	8	31	131 / 190
Chiara & David	Dining Room & Master Bedroom	7	6	8	8	29	161 / 230
Kim & Michelle	Bathroom, Walk-In-Robe & Hallway	7	4	7	7	25	123 / 190
Leigh & Kristie	—N/a						125 / 190

Notes

*^5 Chiara & David had the power of the bonus room to keep it or give it to another team, they decided to give it to Mel & Dave. The bonus room was a Guest Bedroom. Leigh & Kristie judged it as a pass and the team gained 5 points, meaning their score of 33 rose to 38 moving them from second place to first place.

==== Western Australia: Chiara & David ====
- Episodes 23 to 26
- Airdate — 12 to 18 June
- Description —Teams headed to Chiara & David's home in Yangebup, Western Australia for the sixth renovation. Three of the bedrooms belong to their children; Seth, eight years old, Taya, six years old & Ellie Mae, three years old.
  - Previous winner's advantage: Mel & Dave — Ability to allocate the bonus room to another team or keep it for themselves
  - Previous loser's disadvantage: Kim & Michelle — Camping in a tent during the renovation.

Renovation 6
Yangebup, Western Australia
House Rules
Rule 1	Bring the bling with glam luxe style						
Rule 2	Be passionate with red, gold and silver						
Rule 3	Turn the lounge room into a swanky cinema						
Rule 4	Do something dramatic in a sparkly kitchen						
Rule 5	Make the master suite like an OTT 6 star hotel						
Bonus Room Rule	Style a slammin' wrestling bedroom for 8-year-old Seth						
Team	Zone	Scores				Total (out of 40)	Running Total (AH + Reno 1 to 6)
Team	Zone	Homeowner	Drew	Laurence	Wendy	Total (out of 40)	Running Total (AH + Reno 1 to 6)
Toad & Mandy	Bathroom & Ellie Mae's Bedroom	10	7	10	8	35	198 / 270
Mel & Dave	Kitchen & Hallway	9	7	8	7	31	162 / 230
Josh & Brandon	Laundry & Taya's Bedroom	10	7	7	6	30	164 / 230
Jared & Jess	Entry & Master Bedroom	8	6	5	6	25	156 / 230
Kim & Michelle	Lounge Room & Coffee Nook	8	4	6	6	24	147 / 230
Leigh & Kristie	Dining Room, Ensuite & Bonus Room	9	6	7	6	23 (28 - 5)^{6}	148 / 230
Chiara & David	—N/a						161 / 230

Notes

*^6 Mel & Dave had the power of the bonus room to keep it or give it to another team, they decided to give it to Leigh & Kristie. The bonus room was Seth's Bedroom. Chiara & David judged it as a fail and the team lost 5 points, meaning their score of 28 fell to 23 moving them from fourth place to last place.

==== New South Wales: Toad & Mandy ====
- Episodes 27 to 30
- Airdate — 19 to 25 June
- Description —Teams headed to Toad & Mandy's home in Candelo, New South Wales for the seventh & final interior renovation. Two of the bedrooms belong to their 18 month old twins, Lenny & Layla. The lowest scoring team overall will be eliminated.
  - Previous winner's advantage: Mel & Dave — Although Toad & Mandy were the highest scoring team in the previous week, they do not participate in the renovation of their own home, therefore the team to allocate the bonus room to another team or keep it for themselves was given to the second-highest scorer.
  - Previous loser's disadvantage: Leigh & Kristie — Camping in a tent during the renovation.

Renovation 7
Candelo, New South Wales
House Rules
Rule 1	Turn our tired old lady into an elegant homestead						
Rule 2	Colour with jewel tones						
Rule 3	Get dark and moody in an art deco master suite						
Rule 4	Make a big, blokey butcher's kitchen						
Rule 5	Create a contemporary but classic, bathroom						
Bonus Room Rule	Make the ceiling shine in a swish sitting room						
Team	Zone	Scores				Total (out of 40)	Final Total (AH + Reno 1 to 7)
Team	Zone	Homeowner	Drew	Laurence	Wendy	Total (out of 40)	Final Total (AH + Reno 1 to 7)
Mel & Dave	Dining Room & Layla's Bedroom	9	10	10	10	39	1st (201)
Toad & Mandy	—N/a						2nd (198)
Jared & Jess	Entry & Laundry	10	7	9	9	35	=3rd (191)
Chiara & David	Scullery & Lenny's Bedroom	9	7	7	7	30	=3rd (191)
Kim & Michelle	Kitchen, Master Bedroom & Bonus Room	8	5	6	6	30 (25 + 5)^{7}	6th (177)
Josh & Brandon	Bathroom, Boot Room & Hallway	10	6	5	5	26	5th (190)
Leigh & Kristie	Ensuite & Lounge Room	7	6	6	6	25	7th (173)

Notes

*^7 Mel & Dave had the power of the bonus room to keep it or give it to another team, they decided to give it to Kim & Michelle. The bonus room was a Sitting Room. Toad & Mandy judged it as a pass and the team gained 5 points, meaning their score of 25 rose to 30 moving them from last place to fourth place.

=== Phase 3: Gardens & Backyards ===
The 6 remaining teams were challenged to transform the gardens & backyards of each other's homes. Two teams were allocated to a home (that belonged to neither of them) whilst the homeowners are away for the duration of the renovation and had to renovate a zone in the backyard, as well as improve the house exterior. They were held over three rounds, covering all houses of the current teams. After all rounds were complete, the three lowest scoring teams were eliminated.

==== Round 1 ====
- Episodes 31 to 34
- Airdate — 26 June to 2 July
- Description — In round 1 of the exterior renovations, 4 teams headed to Maryborough and Hope Island to transform the gardens and backyards in 4 Days. Teams were allocated to a zone in the back yard of either Josh & Brandon's or Mel & Dave's.

Renovation summary
Round 1
House Rules	Josh & Brandon's (QLD)	Mel & Dave's (QLD)
Rule 1	Go modern Aussie outdoor style	Create a cool coastal vibe
Rule 2	Plunge us into a swim up bar	Make a shipwreck island for the boys
Rule 3	Build a beer garden on the deck	Give us a chill out area by the pool
Rule 4	Give us a games area with a secret cinema	Design a haven for body and soul
Rule 5	Choose your zone	

Team	House	Zone	Scores				Total (out of 40)	Running Total (Round 1)
Team	House	Zone	Homeowner	Drew	Laurence	Wendy	Total (out of 40)	Running Total (Round 1)
Chiara & David	Josh & Brandon's (Maryborough, QLD)	Pool, Beer Garden & Deck Area	7	7	5	8	27	27 / 40
Jess & Jared	Josh & Brandon's (Maryborough, QLD)	Deck, Games Area & Cinema	7	5	6	5	23	23 / 40
Kim & Michelle	Mel & Dave's (Hope Island, QLD)	Kids' Play Area & Body/Soul Haven	8	6	7	7	28	28 / 40
Toad & Mandy	Mel & Dave's (Hope Island, QLD)	Pool, Deck & Chill Out Area	7	6	6	6	25	25 / 40
Josh & Brandon	—N/a							—
Mel & Dave	—N/a							—

==== Round 2 ====
- Episodes 35 to 38
- Airdate — 3 to 9 July
- Description — In round 2 of the exterior renovations, 4 teamsed head to Candelo and Yangebup to transform the gardens and backyards in 4 Days. Teams were allocated to a zone in the back yard of either Toad & Mandy's or Chiara & David's.

Renovation summary
Round 2
House Rules	Toad & Mandy's (NSW)	Chiara & David's (WA)
Rule 1	Be bold with blues in a formal country garden	Give us a sparkly Miami pool party vibe
Rule 2	Warm things up with the ultimate fire pit	Give us a sparkly Miami pool party vibe
Rule 3	Create a country cook's veggie patch	Have fun with a kids water park
Rule 4	Turn the old shed into a pub	Calm us with water features
Rule 5	Choose your zone	

Team	House	Zone	Scores				Total (out of 40)	Running Total (Round 1 & 2)
Team	House	Zone	Homeowner	Drew	Laurence	Wendy	Total (out of 40)	Running Total (Round 1 & 2)
Jess & Jared	Toad & Mandy's (Candelo, NSW)	Fire Pit & Veggie Patch	8	6	7	7	28	51 / 80
Josh & Brandon	Toad & Mandy's (Candelo, NSW)	Pub & Entertaining Deck	6	8	8	9	31	31 / 40
Kim & Michelle	Chiara & David's (Yangebup, WA)	Water Park & Outdoor Dining Patio	7	5	5	6	23	51 / 80
Mel & Dave	Chiara & David's (Yangebup, WA)	Pool Area & Grown Ups Escape	8	7	8	7	30	30 / 40
Toad & Mandy	—N/a							25 / 40
Chiara & David	—N/a							27 / 40

==== Round 3 ====
- Episodes 39 to 42
- Airdate — 10 to 16 July
- Description — In round 3 of the exterior renovations, 4 teams headed to Adelaide and Tweed Heads to transform the gardens and backyards in 4 Days. Teams weare allocated to a zone in the back yard of either Jess & Jared's or Kim & Michelle's. In a House Rules first, the three lowest scoring teams overall were eliminated.

Renovation summary
Round 3
House Rules	Jess & Jared's (SA)	Kim & Michelle's (NSW)
Rule 1	Style a NY high-line entertaining area	Help us chill with a Balinese backyard
Rule 2	Bring the Bronx down the side	Use the colours of a sunset
Rule 3	Make a cool pop up pizza joint	Create a private oasis off the master suite
Rule 4	Add attitude with sculptures and art	Go wild with a play area for the kids
Rule 5	Choose your zone	

Team	House	Zone	Scores				Total (out of 40)	Final Total (Round 1 to 3)
Team	House	Zone	Homeowner	Drew	Laurence	Wendy	Total (out of 40)	Final Total (Round 1 to 3)
Josh & Brandon	Jess & Jared's (Adelaide, SA)	Entertaining Area	7	7	5	7	26	4th (57)
Toad & Mandy	Jess & Jared's (Adelaide, SA)	Pizza Joint	9	9	10	10	38	2nd (63)
Chiara & David	Kim & Michelle's (Tweed Heads, NSW)	Private Oasis	7	9	10	9	35	3rd (62)
Mel & Dave	Kim & Michelle's (Tweed Heads, NSW)	Kids area and pool area	7	8	10	9	34	1st (64)
Jess & Jared	—N/a							=5th (51)
Kim & Michelle	—N/a							=5th (51)

=== Phase 4 ===
==== Give Back Makeover ====
- Episodes 43 to 45
- Airdate — 22 to 24 July
- Description — The 3 remaining teams headed to Woonona, New South Wales, namely the home of Chelsea and her 17 month old daughter, Koa. Chelsea & her husband Wayde had applied for the series and were successful; however, Wayde died after an accident whilst fishing. The lowest-scoring team was eliminated and the top 2 advanced into the Grand Final.
  - Previous winner's advantage: Mel & Dave — Ability to allocate the bonus room to another team or keep it for themselves

Renovation summary
Give Back Makeover
House Rules
Rule 1	Combine coastal cottage with mid-century modern				
Rule 2	Use tans, teals and mustards				
Rule 3	Create thoughtful spaces for Koa				
Rule 4	Include memories of Wayde				
Rule 5	Finesse with warm metallics				
Bonus Room Rule	Be creative with a colourful boho haven				
Team	Zone	Scores			Round Total (out of 30)
Team	Zone	Drew	Laurence	Wendy	Round Total (out of 30)
Mel & Dave	Entry, Ensuite, Koa's Bedroom, Dining Room, Laundry & Bonus Room	7	9	8	29 (24+5)^{8}
Toad & Mandy	Front Exterior, Master Bedroom, Bathroon & Lounge Room	8	8	8	24
Chiara & David	Hallway, Guest Bedroom, Kitchen & Atrium	6	7	7	20

Notes

*^8 Mel & Dave received the bonus room and decided to keep it. The bonus room was a Back Deck. Wendy and Laurence judged it as a pass and the team gained 5 points, meaning their score of 24 rose to 29 causing them to move to first place and Chiara & David to be eliminated.

=== Grand Final ===
- Episode 46
- Airdate — 30 July
- Description — The final 2 teams had 4 days to renovate their opponent's front yard. The team that received the highest score won the season (thus becoming House Rules 2018 Champion) and received $355,000.

Renovation summary
Grand Final
House Rules	Mel & Dave's (QLD)	Toad & Mandy's (NSW)
Rule 1	Turn '80's brown brick' into 'Hamptons dream'	Restore our charming country verandah
Rule 2	Celebrate the water views	Create spaces to relax and enjoy the farm
Rule 3	Use blues, greens and greys	Be clever with flowers to add colour
Rule 4	Stay together at all times	
Rule 5	You have four days	

Team	Area	Scores			Total (out of 30)	Final Result
Team	Area	Drew	Laurence	Wendy	Total (out of 30)	Final Result
Toad & Mandy	Front yard	7	8	9	24	Winners
Mel & Dave	Front yard	8	7	8	23	Runners-up

== Ratings ==
Colour key:
– Highest number of viewers/nightly rank during the season
– Lowest number of viewers/nightly rank during the season

Wk.	Ep no.	Episode titles by stage of season				Air date	Viewers (millions)^{[a]}	Nightly rank^{[a]}	Source
1	1	Phase 1: Auction House		Introduction		Monday, 7 May	0.607	12	
1	2	Phase 1: Auction House		House Reveal & Auction		Tuesday, 8 May	0.621	11	
2	3	Phase 2: Interior Renovation	SA Renovation (Jess & Jared)	Introduction		Wednesday, 9 May	0.624	11	
2	4	Phase 2: Interior Renovation	SA Renovation (Jess & Jared)	Renovation Continues		Thursday, 10 May	0.567	9	
2	5	Phase 2: Interior Renovation	SA Renovation (Jess & Jared)	House Reveal	Judges Scores	Sunday, 13 May	0.686	8	
2	6	Phase 2: Interior Renovation	SA Renovation (Jess & Jared)	House Reveal	Homeowners Scores	Monday, 14 May	0.673	11	
3	7	Phase 2: Interior Renovation	QLD Renovation (Mel & Dave)	Introduction		Tuesday, 15 May	0.599	10	
3	8	Phase 2: Interior Renovation	QLD Renovation (Mel & Dave)	Renovation Continues		Wednesday, 16 May	0.651	12	
3	9	Phase 2: Interior Renovation	QLD Renovation (Mel & Dave)	House Reveal	Judges Scores	Sunday, 20 May	0.798	5	
3	10	Phase 2: Interior Renovation	QLD Renovation (Mel & Dave)	House Reveal	Homeowners Scores	Monday, 21 May	0.740	9	
4	11	Phase 2: Interior Renovation	QLD Renovation (Josh & Brandon)	Introduction		Tuesday, 22 May	0.638	9	
4	12	Phase 2: Interior Renovation	QLD Renovation (Josh & Brandon)	Renovation Continues		Wednesday, 23 May	0.682	10	
4	13	Phase 2: Interior Renovation	QLD Renovation (Josh & Brandon)	House Reveal	Judges Scores	Sunday, 27 May	0.795	5	
4	14	Phase 2: Interior Renovation	QLD Renovation (Josh & Brandon)	House Reveal	Homeowners Scores	Monday, 28 May	0.801	8	
5	15	Phase 2: Interior Renovation	NSW Renovation (Kim & Michelle)	Introduction		Tuesday, 29 May	0.729	7	
5	16	Phase 2: Interior Renovation	NSW Renovation (Kim & Michelle)	Renovation Continues		Wednesday, 30 May	0.714	8	
5	17	Phase 2: Interior Renovation	NSW Renovation (Kim & Michelle)	House Reveal	Judges Scores	Sunday, 3 June	0.882	3	
5	18	Phase 2: Interior Renovation	NSW Renovation (Kim & Michelle)	House Reveal	Homeowners Scores	Monday, 4 June	0.786	7	
6	19	Phase 2: Interior Renovation	VIC Renovation (Leigh & Kristie)	Introduction		Tuesday, 5 June	0.674	9	
6	20	Phase 2: Interior Renovation	VIC Renovation (Leigh & Kristie)	Renovation Continues		Wednesday, 6 June^{[b]}	0.343^{[e]}	—N/a	^{[d]}
6	20	Phase 2: Interior Renovation	VIC Renovation (Leigh & Kristie)	Renovation Continues		Thursday, 7 June^{[c]}	0.334	20	
6	21	Phase 2: Interior Renovation	VIC Renovation (Leigh & Kristie)	House Reveal	Judges Scores	Sunday, 10 June	0.795	3	
6	22	Phase 2: Interior Renovation	VIC Renovation (Leigh & Kristie)	House Reveal	Homeowners Scores	Monday, 11 June	0.861	6	
7	23	Phase 2: Interior Renovation	WA Renovation (Chiara & David)	Introduction		Tuesday, 12 June	0.713	7	
7	24	Phase 2: Interior Renovation	WA Renovation (Chiara & David)	Renovation Continues		Wednesday, 13 June	0.732	7	
7	25	Phase 2: Interior Renovation	WA Renovation (Chiara & David)	House Reveal	Judges Scores	Sunday, 17 June	0.910	5	
7	26	Phase 2: Interior Renovation	WA Renovation (Chiara & David)	House Reveal	Homeowners Scores	Monday, 18 June	0.890	5	
8	27	Phase 2: Interior Renovation	NSW Renovation (Toad & Mandy)	Introduction		Tuesday, 19 June	0.804	6	
8	28	Phase 2: Interior Renovation	NSW Renovation (Toad & Mandy)	Renovation Continues		Wednesday, 20 June	0.806	6	
8	29	Phase 2: Interior Renovation	NSW Renovation (Toad & Mandy)	House Reveal	Judges Scores	Sunday, 24 June	0.948	6	
8	30	Phase 2: Interior Renovation	NSW Renovation (Toad & Mandy)	House Reveal	Homeowners Scores & Elimination	Monday, 25 June	0.953	5	
9	31	Phase 3: Gardens & Backyards	Round 1	Introduction		Tuesday, 26 June	0.756	9	
9	32	Phase 3: Gardens & Backyards	Round 1	Renovation Continues		Wednesday, 27 June	0.763	7	
9	33	Phase 3: Gardens & Backyards	Round 1	Garden Reveal	Judges Scores	Sunday, 1 July	0.915	3	
9	34	Phase 3: Gardens & Backyards	Round 1	Garden Reveal	Homeowners Scores	Monday, 2 July	0.851	6	
10	35	Phase 3: Gardens & Backyards	Round 2	Introduction		Tuesday, 3 July	0.673	9	
10	36	Phase 3: Gardens & Backyards	Round 2	Renovation Continues		Wednesday, 4 July	0.748	7	
10	37	Phase 3: Gardens & Backyards	Round 2	Garden Reveal	Judges Scores	Sunday, 8 July	0.835	4	
10	38	Phase 3: Gardens & Backyards	Round 2	Garden Reveal	Homeowners Scores	Monday, 9 July	0.768	9	
11	39	Phase 3: Gardens & Backyards	Round 3	Introduction		Tuesday, 10 July	0.692	9	
11	40	Phase 3: Gardens & Backyards	Round 3	Renovation Continues		Wednesday, 11 July	0.610	11	
11	41	Phase 3: Gardens & Backyards	Round 3	Garden Reveal	Judges Scores	Sunday, 15 July	0.876	4	
11	42	Phase 3: Gardens & Backyards	Round 3	Garden Reveal	Homeowners Scores & Elimination	Monday, 16 July	0.838	7	
12	43	Phase 4: Give Back Makeover		Introduction		Sunday, 22 July	0.928	4	
12	44	Phase 4: Give Back Makeover		Renovation Continues		Monday, 23 July	0.829	7	
12	45	Phase 4: Give Back Makeover		Reveal, Judges' scores & Elimination		Tuesday, 24 July	0.824	6	
13	46	Grand Final		Final Rooms & Judging		Monday, 30 July	0.853	9	
13	46	Grand Final		Winner announced		Monday, 30 July	0.915	6	

== Notes ==
- ^{a} Ratings data used is from OzTAM and represents the live and same day average viewership from the 5 largest Australian metropolitan centres (Sydney, Melbourne, Brisbane, Perth and Adelaide).
- ^{b} Melbourne, Adelaide & Perth only
- ^{c} Sydney & Brisbane only
- ^{d} Not in the top 20
- ^{e} Nightly rank was the lowest for this season.
