= Daniel Foley =

Daniel Foley may refer to:

- Daniel Foley (jurist), American retired attorney and judge
- Daniel Foley (professor) (1815–1874), Irish professor and Protestant missionary
- Daniel R. Foley, American politician
- Dan Foley (born 1960), Australian rules footballer
