= Elyse Knowles =

Australian model (born 1992)

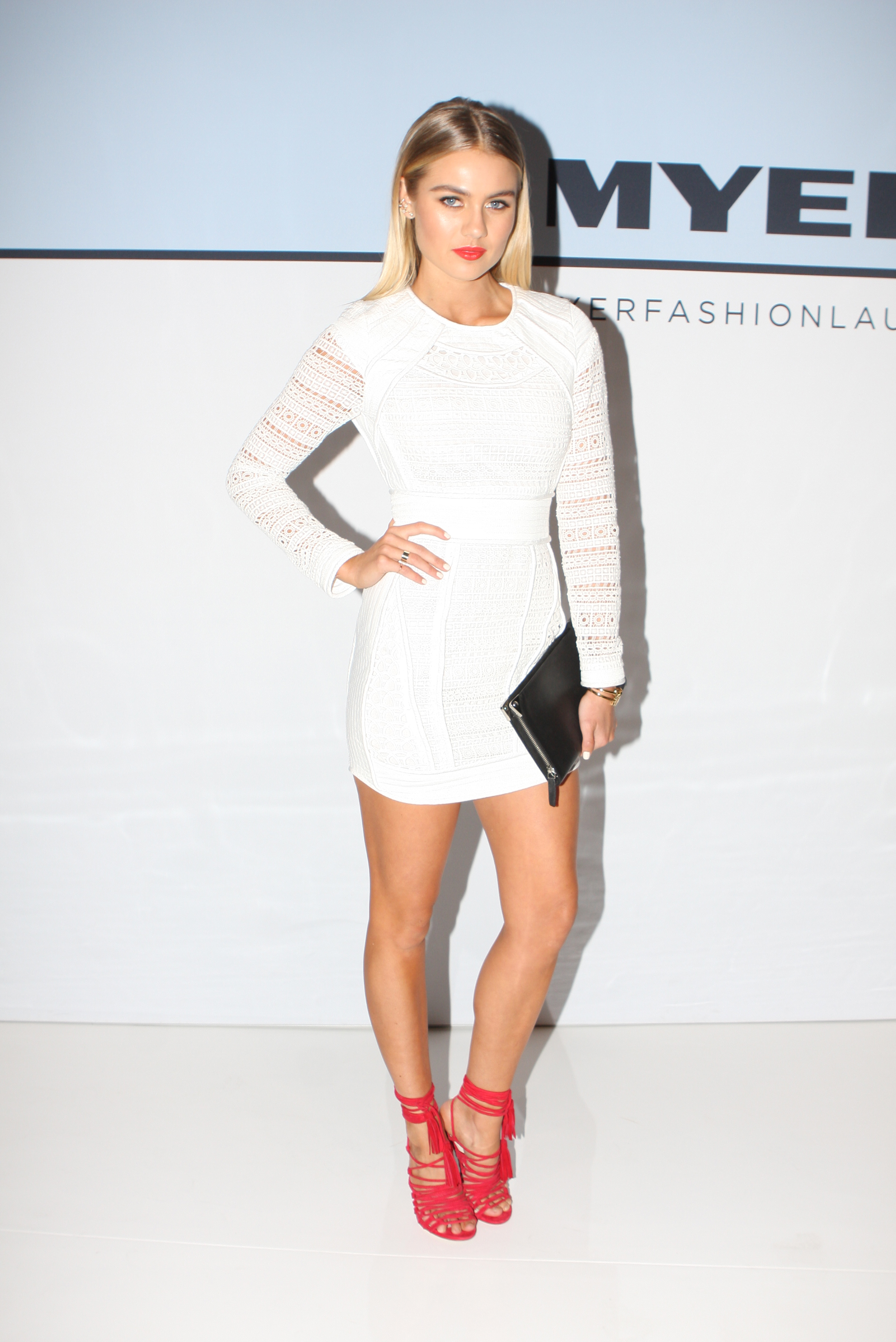
- Elyse Knowles in August 2015
- Born: 30 September 1992 (age 34); Melbourne, Australia
- Occupation: Model
- Years active: 2002-present
- Modeling information
- Height: 5 ft 9 in (1.75 m)
- Hair color: Blonde
- Eye color: Blue

Elyse Knowles (born 30 September 1992) is an Australian model best known for winning the reality television series The Block in 2017.

She is a brand ambassador for Myer.

== Early life ==
Knowles was born and raised in Melbourne, Australia to Stuart and Kim on 30 September 1992. She has two younger siblings: a sister, Tahlea, and a brother, Brayden. She grew up in the suburb of Eltham and attended Eltham High School.

Knowles started modelling when she was 10 years old. Throughout primary school she worked for a group of family brands like Target Australia, until she was chosen for a Jay Jays campaign. When she turned 16, she travelled to China and Hong Kong to model internationally.

== Career ==
In 2015, she became a fitness model for Billabong and also designated as an ambassador for the Formula 1 Rolex Australian Grand Prix as well as the Melbourne Spring Racing ambassador. Elyse also launched her own fashion label, "Evrryday".

In 2016, Knowles was the face of ulta3 and the Caulfield Cup Carnival, an ambassador for ATC Longines Golden Slipper alongside Rachel Griffiths, and an ambassador for DHL's "Safer Beaches" campaign.

Knowles and her boyfriend Josh Barker were one of five couples competing in Nine Network's thirteenth season of The Block, premiered on 30 July 2017. They won when their renovated house was sold at auction to comedian Dave Hughes for $3.067 million AUD. This allowed the couple to pay off their mortgage. In the same year, Elyse became WaterAid's event ambassador, in her first charity ambassador role.

The publicity boost from Knowles' win in The Block helped her book more modelling gigs and had contributed to a busy 2018. During this year, she was designated as an ambassador for Aveda Haircare, Australian swimwear brand Seafolly, Davidoff Parfum ‘Cool Water' Fragrance, and the Australian department store chain Myer. Knowles succeeded fellow Aussie model Jennifer Hawkins as an ambassador of Myer, after the latter stepped down from the role after 12 years.

== Personal life ==
Knowles met her fiancé Josh Barker in his hometown, Byron Bay, in 2013. They moved from Melbourne together and have sons named Sunny and Zaii along with a daughter named Java.

After winning the 13th season of The Block, the couple founded J&E projects in 2018, a building and design company that handles projects in Melbourne and Byron Bay.
