= The Block season 12 =

The Block
- Season 12
- No. of episodes: 46

Release
- Original network: Nine Network
- Original release: 21 August – 13 November 2016

Season chronology
- ← Previous; Season 11 Next → Season 13

The twelfth season of Australian reality television series The Block premiered on 21 August 2016 on the Nine Network. Both hosts Scott Cam (host) and Shelley Craft (Challenge Master) returned from the previous season, as did the three judges: Neale Whitaker, Shaynna Blaze and Darren Palmer.

== Production ==
On 28 October 2015, Nine renewed the series for a twelfth season. Since 2013, the Nine Network has aired two seasons of the show each year. In 2016, however, only one season aired, and it did not air until the last quarter of 2016. It will once again be set in Melbourne. On 27 December 2015, Frank Valentic, teased a video saying that there are rumours of The Block going to Greville Street, Prahran.

On 18 February 2016, it was reported that The Block producers bought an old heritage listed soap factory for $5 million at 164 Ingles Street, Port Melbourne,

Filming for the season began on 26 May 2016. The Block auctions (or Block-tions) for the apartments were held on Saturday, 12 November 2016.

== Contestants ==
The Block 2016 is the fourth season to have five couples instead of the traditional four couples. Julia & Sasha are the first ever female same-sex couple to compete on any season of The Block.

Apt	Couple	Age	Location	Relationship	Occupations
1	Will Bethune & Karlie Cicero	Both 25	Brisbane	High School Sweethearts	Electrician & Quantity Surveyor
2	Dan & Carleen Foley	55 & 52	Perth	Married	Handyman & Hairdresser
3	Andy Sunderland & Ben Toyne	Both 25	Geelong	Best Mates	Primary School Teachers
4	Julia Treuel & Sasha Wright-Neville	31 & 42	Melbourne	Partners	Property Stylist & Software Account Executive
5	Chris & Kim Elliot	34 & 32	Newcastle	Married with children	Detective & School Teacher

== Score history ==
Teams' progress through the competition
Scores:	Teams				
Scores:	Will & Karlie	Dan & Carleen	Andy & Ben	Julia & Sasha	Chris & Kim
Rooms	Scores				
Master Ensuite	25	17	21½	26½	19½
1st Guest Bedroom & Walk-in-robe	27	17½	23½	21½	26½
Main Bathroom	27	29	19½	28½	19
2nd Guest Bedroom & Walk-in-robe	26½	26	30	24	24½
Living & Dining Room	20½	26½	22	25½	21
Master Bedroom & Walk-in-robe	26	24½	24	28½	29
Hallway, Laundry & Powder Room	27½	11	21	16½	21½
Kitchen	30	30	29	28	24
Terrace & Re-do Room	27	25½	17	29½	29½
Challenge Apartment: Room 1	24	27½	26	23	28½
Challenge Apartment: Room 2	35½	27	19	40	22
Auction Order	1st	3rd	5th	2nd	4th
Auction Result	1st	3rd	4th	2nd	5th

== Results ==
=== Judges' scores ===
Colour key:
Highest Score
Lowest Score

Summary of judges' scores
Week	Area(s)	Scores	Teams				
Week	Area(s)	Scores	Will & Karlie	Dan & Carleen	Andy & Ben	Julia & Sasha	Chris & Kim
1	Master Ensuite	Darren	8½	5	7½	9	7
1	Master Ensuite	Shaynna	8½	5½	7	8½	6½
1	Master Ensuite	Neale	8	6½	7	9	6
1	Master Ensuite	Total	25	17	21½	26½	19½
2	1st Guest Bedroom & Walk-in-robe	Darren	9	6½	7½	8½	9
2	1st Guest Bedroom & Walk-in-robe	Shaynna	9	5½	8	6½	8½
2	1st Guest Bedroom & Walk-in-robe	Neale	9	5½	8	6½	9
2	1st Guest Bedroom & Walk-in-robe	Total	27	17½	23½	21½	26½
3	Main Bathroom	Darren	8½	9½	6½	9½	5
3	Main Bathroom	Shaynna	9½	9½	6½	9½	6½
3	Main Bathroom	Neale	9	10	6½	9½	7½
3	Main Bathroom	Total	27	29	19½	28½	19
4	2nd Guest Bedroom & Walk-in-robe	Darren	9½	9	10	8½	8½
4	2nd Guest Bedroom & Walk-in-robe	Shaynna	8½	8½	10	8	8
4	2nd Guest Bedroom & Walk-in-robe	Neale	8½	8½	10	7½	8
4	2nd Guest Bedroom & Walk-in-robe	Total	26½	26	30	24	24½
5	Living & Dining Room	Darren	7	8½	7	8½	7½
5	Living & Dining Room	Shaynna	7	8½	7½	8½	6½
5	Living & Dining Room	Neale	6½	8½ + 1^{[c]}	7½	8½	7
5	Living & Dining Room	Total	20½	26½	22	25½	21
6	Master Bedroom & Walk-in-robe	Darren	8½	8	8	9½	9½
6	Master Bedroom & Walk-in-robe	Shaynna	8½	8	8	9½	9½
6	Master Bedroom & Walk-in-robe	Neale	9	8½	8	9½	10
6	Master Bedroom & Walk-in-robe	Total	26	24½	24	28½	29
7	Hallway, Laundry & Powder Room	Darren	9	5	7	6½	7½
7	Hallway, Laundry & Powder Room	Shaynna	9	3	7	5	7
7	Hallway, Laundry & Powder Room	Neale	9½	3	7	5	7
7	Hallway, Laundry & Powder Room	Total	27½	11^{[d]}	21	16½	21½
8	Kitchen	Darren	10	10	9½	9½	8
8	Kitchen	Shaynna	10	10	9½	9	8
8	Kitchen	Neale	10	10	9 + 1^{[c]}	9½	8
8	Kitchen	Total	30	30	29	28	24
9	Terrace & Re-do Room^{[e]}	Darren	9	9	6	10	9½
9	Terrace & Re-do Room^{[e]}	Shaynna	9	7½	6	9½	10
9	Terrace & Re-do Room^{[e]}	Neale	9	9	5	10	10
9	Terrace & Re-do Room^{[e]}	Total	27	25½	17	29½	29½
10	Challenge Apartment: Room 1	Darren	8	9	8½	8	9½
10	Challenge Apartment: Room 1	Shaynna	8	9	8½	8	9½
10	Challenge Apartment: Room 1	Neale	8	9½	9	7	9½
10	Challenge Apartment: Room 1	Total	24	27½	26	23	28½
11	Challenge Apartment: Room 2	Darren	9	7	5	10	6
11	Challenge Apartment: Room 2	Shaynna	8½	7	5	10	5
11	Challenge Apartment: Room 2	Neale	8½	7	6	10	6
11	Challenge Apartment: Room 2	John	7½	6	3	10	5
11	Challenge Apartment: Room 2	Total	33½	27	19	40	22

=== Challenge Scores ===
Summary of challenge scores
Week	Challenge		Reward	Teams				
Week	Challenge	Description	Reward	William & Karlie	Dan & Carleen	Andy & Ben	Julia & Sasha	Chris & Kim
1	the 48-hour challenge	Convert a pod into a bedroom/ ensuite on a $5000 budget	Pick which apartment they wanted	Apt 1 (5th)	Apt 2 (3rd)^{[b]}	Apt 3 (4th)	Apt 4 (2nd)	Apt 5 (1st)
2	N/A							
3	The Block History Test	Paper test on The Block's history & the history of Art Deco	$50,000 worth of Gaggenau kitchen appliances	28 (2nd)	21 (5th)	26 (3rd)	34 (1st)	25 (4th)
4	Restore & Re-purpose challenge	Restore one piece of furniture & Re-purpose one piece of furniture	$5,000 & a bonus point	—	1st	—	—	—
4	the Taco Eating Challenge	Eat the most tacos as possible	$2,349 Freedom Sofa	—	—	1st	—	—
5	Bedroom Makeover Challenge	Makeover a Daylesford Homestead hotel bedroom	$10,000 & how much to give to the 2nd & 3rd couple	1st ($9,000)	—	—	2nd ($600)	3rd ($400)
6	Soap Challenge	Create a bar of soap with Glasshouse Fragrances essence's	$5,000, a bonus point & their soap sold in David Jones stores	—	—	1st	—	—
7	Tassie Timber Challenge	Design a dining table for their terrace	Rare Tasmanian timbers worth between $18-35k to be used to create their table	1st ($35,000 Blackheart Sassafras Timber)	2nd ($25,000 Western Beech Timber)	5th ($18,000 Blackwood Timber)	4th ($20,000 Golden Sassafras Timber)	3rd ($22,000 Celery Top Pine Timber)
7	Last Blockhead Standing Challenge	Quiz based on things that occurred on The Block Radio	$5,000	—	—	1st	—	—
8	Terrace Table Challenge	Build a dining table for their terrace with a styling theme	$5,000	Italian Antipasto theme	Kids Birthday Party theme	High Tea theme	Engagement Brunch theme	Christmas Lunch theme
9	Beach Money Challenge	Use a metal detector to find money underneath beach sand	$7,500 overall	1st ($5,000)	—	—	—	1st ($2,500)
9	Canape Challenge	Make canapes' for harmony singing group Human Nature	$5,000	1st ($2,500)	—	—	1st ($2,500)	—
9	Brendan Fevola Cooking Challenge	Cook two meals for former AFL star Brendan Fevola & his wife Alex	$10,000 Overall	—	—	1st ($6,000)	2nd ($4,000)	—
10	N/A							
11	N/A							

=== Challenge Apartment ===
Week 10
Score Rank	Room 1		Prize^{[f]}
Score Rank	Team	Room	Prize^{[f]}
1	Chris & Kim	Terrace	$20,000
2	Dan & Carleen	Main Bathroom	$15,000
3	Andy & Ben	Main Ensuite	$10,000
4	William & Karlie	1st Guest Bedroom	$0
5	Julia & Sasha	2nd Guest Bedroom	$0
Week 11
Score Rank	Room 2		Prize^{[g]}
Score Rank	Team	Room	Prize^{[g]}
1	Julia & Sasha	Kitchen	$20,000
2	William & Karlie	Garden Courtyard	$15,000
3	Dan & Carleen	Living and Dining room	$10,000
4	Chris & Kim	Hallway, Laundry and Powder room	$0
5	Andy & Ben	Master Bedroom	$0

Team	Rooms	Auction spot pick	Total prize money	Original reserve	New reserve
Dan & Carleen	Main Bathroom & Living and Dining room	3rd (3rd choice)	$25,000	$1.800m	$1.775m
Chris & Kim	Terrace & Hallway, Laundry and Powder room	4th (4th choice)	$20,000	$1.900m	$1.880m
Julia & Sasha	2nd Guest Bedroom & Kitchen	2nd (1st choice)	$20,000	$1.950m	$1.930m
William & Karlie	1st Guest Bedroom & Garden Courtyard	1st (2nd choice)	$15,000	$1.900m	$1.885m
Andy & Ben	Master Ensuite & Master Bedroom	5th (last choice)	$10,000	$1.750m	$1.740m

=== Auction ===
Rank	Couple	Reserve	Auction Result	Profit	Total Winnings	Auction Order
1	William & Karlie	$1.885m	$2.600m	$715,000	$815,000	1st
2	Julia & Sasha	$1.930m	$2.590m	$660,000	$660,000	2nd
3	Dan & Carleen	$1.775m	$2.300m	$525,000	$525,000	3rd
4	Andy & Ben	$1.740m	$2.250m	$510,000	$510,000	5th
5	Chris & Kim	$1.880m	$2.305m	$425,000	$425,000	4th

== Ratings ==
The Block 2016 metropolitan viewership and nightly position Colour key: – Highest rating during the series – Lowest rating during the series
Week	Episode		Original airdate	Timeslot	Viewers (millions)^{[a]}	Nightly rank^{[a]}	Source
1	1	"The Biggest Block Begins"	21 August 2016	Sunday 7:00pm	1.074	#3	
1	2	"The Vault Is Opened"	22 August 2016	Monday 7:30pm	0.961	#7	
1	3	"Battle Of The Master Bathrooms"	23 August 2016	Tuesday 7:30pm	0.944	#5	
2	4	"Master Ensuites Revealed"	28 August 2016	Sunday 7:00pm	1.151	#4	
2	5	"Demolition And Design"	29 August 2016	Monday 7:30pm	0.932	#5	
2	6	"1st Guest Bedrooms Continue"	30 August 2016	Tuesday 7:30pm	0.792	#9	
2	7	"Budget Blowouts"	31 August 2016	Wednesday 7:30pm	0.786	#10	
3	8	"1st Guest Bedrooms Revealed"	4 September 2016	Sunday 7:00pm	1.071	#2	
3	9	"The Art Of Art Deco"	5 September 2016	Monday 7:30pm	0.903	#5	
3	10	"Main Bathrooms Continue"	6 September 2016	Tuesday 7:30pm	0.846	#6	
3	11	"The Roof Top Garden Challenge"	7 September 2016	Wednesday 7:30pm	0.786	#10	
4	12	"Main Bathrooms Revealed"	11 September 2016	Sunday 7:00pm	1.101	#3	
4	13	"2nd Guest Bedroom Week"	12 September 2016	Monday 7:30pm	0.921	#5	
4	14	"Restoration And Re-purposing Challenge"	13 September 2016	Tuesday 7:30pm	0.948	#7	
4	15	"Flooring Disaster"	14 September 2016	Wednesday 7:30pm	0.851	#6	
5	16	"2nd Guest Bedrooms Revealed"	18 September 2016	Sunday 7:00pm	1.212	#1	
5	17	"Living And Dining Week Begins"	19 September 2016	Monday 7:30pm	1.019	#2	
5	18	"$10,000 Challenge"	20 September 2016	Tuesday 7:30pm	1.014	#4	
5	19	"Mid Week Blues"	21 September 2016	Wednesday 7:30pm	0.819	#8	
6	20	"Living And Dining Rooms Revealed"	25 September 2016	Sunday 7:00pm	1.166	#2	
6	21	"Master Bedroom Week Begins"	26 September 2016	Monday 7:30pm	0.890	#7	
6	22	"Bubbles Challenge"	27 September 2016	Tuesday 7:30pm	0.933	#5	
6	23	"Budget Blues"	28 September 2016	Wednesday 7:30pm	0.817	#5	
7	24	"Master Bedrooms Revealed"	3 October 2016	Monday 7:30pm	1.069	#5	
7	25	"Hallway, Laundry And Powder Rooms"	4 October 2016	Tuesday 7:30pm	0.931	#5	
7	26	"Tassie Road Trip Challenge"	5 October 2016	Wednesday 7:30pm	0.902	#3	
7	27	"Mid Week Mayhem"	6 October 2016	Thursday 7:30pm	0.828	#5	
8	28	"Hallways, Laundries And Powder Rooms Revealed"	9 October 2016	Sunday 7:00pm	1.156	#2	
8	29	"Kitchen Week Begins"	10 October 2016	Monday 7:30pm	1.008	#3	
8	30	"Challenge Day"	11 October 2016	Tuesday 7:30pm	0.953	#3	
8	31	"Kitchen Week Chaos"	12 October 2016	Wednesday 7:30pm	0.906	#4	
9	32	"Kitchens Revealed"	16 October 2016	Sunday 7:00pm	1.279	#1	
9	33	"Terrace And Re-do Rooms"	17 October 2016	Monday 7:30pm	1.027	#3	
9	34	"Budget Blues"	18 October 2016	Tuesday 7:30pm	1.045	#3	
9	35	"Brendan Fevola Cooking Challenge"	19 October 2016	Wednesday 7:30pm	1.032	#2	
10	36	"Terraces Revealed"	23 October 2016	Sunday 7:00pm	1.190	#1	
10	37	"The Final Challenge Begins"	24 October 2016	Monday 7:30pm	0.946	#3	
10	38	"Renovating Roller Coaster"	25 October 2016	Tuesday 7:30pm	0.911	#6	
10	39	"Challenge Episode Takes Shape"	26 October 2016	Wednesday 7:30pm	0.910	#5	
11	40	"Challenge Apartment Rooms Revealed"	30 October 2016	Sunday 7:00pm	1.175	#1	
11	41	"Final Week Begins"	31 October 2016	Monday 7:30pm	0.918	#3	
11	42	"Budget Blues And Budget Wins"	1 November 2016	Tuesday 7:30pm	0.980	#6	
11	43	"Birthday Bash"	2 November 2016	Wednesday 7:30pm	1.033	#1	
12	44	"Final Challenge Rooms Revealed"	7 November 2016	Monday 7:30pm	—N/a^{[h]}	—N/a^{[h]}	
12	45	"Party Time"	8 November 2016	Tuesday 7:30pm	0.897	#5	
13	46	"Grand Final/ Auctions"	13 November 2016	Sunday 7:00 pm	1.712	#2	
13	46	"Winner Announced"	13 November 2016	Sunday 7:00 pm	2.104	#1	

== Notes ==
- ^{a} Ratings data is from OzTAM and represents the live and same day average viewership from the 5 largest Australian metropolitan centres (Sydney, Melbourne, Brisbane, Perth and Adelaide).
- ^{b} In Apartment 2 resided a secret vault of which the contents were unknown until it was opened. Whoever selected Apartment 2 (Dan & Carleen) were able to open it and take ownership of the contents within. The vault contained $30,000 worth of products (antiques from the original building and other items) in addition to $40,000 which can be used to extend their renovation budget, take off their reserve price or any combination of the two.
- ^{c} This team used a bonus point they won in a challenge
- ^{d} This team did not present a completed room due to a problem with unleveled flooring
- ^{e} Along with creating their Terraces, each contestant were given $5000 to re-do their worst room. these were their re-do rooms:
  Will & Karlie - Living Room
  Dan & Carleen - 1st Guest Bedroom
  Andy & Ben - Hallway
  Sasha & Julia - 1st & 2nd Guest Bedrooms
  Chris & Kim - Main Bathroom
- ^{f} The prize money that the team wins get taken off their reserve price
- ^{g} The prize money that the team wins get taken off their reserve price, also in order rank of winning, they get to have their pick of their Auction Spot
- ^{h} This episode was not scheduled to air until 8 November 2016 due to a test cricket telecast, however the episode aired unscheduled when the sporting event ended early, but was not logged in OzTAM ratings reports, thus ratings for the episode are not available.
