= The Block season 11 =

The Block
- Season 11
- No. of episodes: 47

Release
- Original network: Nine Network
- Original release: 6 September – 25 November 2015

Season chronology
- ← Previous; Season 10 Next → Season 12

The eleventh season of Australian reality television series The Block premiered on 6 September 2015 on the Nine Network. Scott Cam (host) and Shelley Craft (Challenge Master) return from the previous season, as did the three judges: Neale Whitaker, Shaynna Blaze and Darren Palmer. The first preview was shown on August 4, 2015. This season was also known by the name The Block: Blocktagon, but was the first since the second season to not include the season title on-screen.

== Production ==
Nine renewed The Block for an eleventh season in April 2015, with production commencing in May 2015. The season was announced as going 'back-to-basics' after ratings declines during the tenth season, seeing episodes cut from 90 to 60 minutes, fewer episodes, the eliminations will be removed and Thursday night episodes dropped.

This former hotel is located at 5 Commercial Road in South Yarra.

Filming for the eleventh began on 15 May 2015. The season renovated the former Hotel Saville in South Yarra - an octagonal, eight floor brick building.

Co-creator Julian Cress said that this season of The Block will have no tradies and only passionate do-it-yourself couples, in other seasons of The Block, at least one person in each team has a trade. The change comes in the new direction in the back-to-basics change to the season, he said viewers will relate more to the characters who are big on spirit but small on skills when the show returns later this year.

The Blocktagon building is now listed in the international list of Octagonal Buildings & Structures.

== Contestants ==
The Block: Blocktagon is the third season to have five couples instead of the traditional four couples.

Level	Couple	Age	Alias	Location	Relationship	Occupations
1	Kingi & Caro Tahana	Both 31	"The Larrikins"	Townsville, QLD	Married with a child	Renderer & Business Development Manager
2	Andrew Simmons & Whitney Nolan^{[l]}	Both 29	"The Sweethearts"	Melbourne, VIC	Former Partners	Form Worker & Beauty Therapist
3	Suzi Taylor & Voni Cosier	44 & 39	"The Single Mums"	Gold Coast, QLD	Former Best Mates	Real Estate Agent & Fitness Studio Manager
4	Luke & Ebony; Haythornthwaite^{[b]}	29 & 24	"The 2nd Chance Siblings"	Perth, WA	Brother & Sister	Carpenter/Landscaper & Interior Designer/Decorator
5	Dean & Shay Paine	30 & 29	"The Go-Getters"	Newcastle, NSW	Married with a child	Electrician & English/Drama Teacher

== Score history ==
Teams' progress through the competition
Scores:	Teams				
Scores:	Kingi & Caro	Andrew & Whitney	Suzi & Voni	Luke & Ebony	Dean & Shay
Rooms	Scores				
Main Ensuite	27½	26½	24	22½	28½
1st Guest Bedroom & Ensuite	26½	18½	23	18	27½
Master Bedroom & Walk-in Robe	27½	18½	30	22	23
2nd Guest Bedroom & Ensuite	28½	23½	28	20½	26½
Study, Guest Powder Room & Laundry	28½	24½	19½	27½	25½
Living Room	20	23	18	23½	12^{[e]}
Kitchen	29	25½	25	27	28½
Dining Room & Foyer	25½	26	16	19	21
Terrace & Re-Do Room	27	24	21	24	28½
Challenge Apartment: Room 1	28½	24	22½	25½	29
Challenge Apartment: Room 2	27½	29½	29	28	30
Auction Order	1st	4th	2nd	5th	3rd
Auction Result	3rd	4th	5th	2nd	1st

== Results ==
=== Room reveals ===
Week	Room	Judges' verdict			
Week	Room	Winner	Score	Lowest	Score
1	Main Ensuite	Dean & Shay	28½	Luke & Ebony	22½
2	1st Guest Bedroom & Ensuite	Dean & Shay	27½	Luke & Ebony	18
3	Master Bedroom & Walk-in Robe	Suzi & Voni	30	Andrew & Whitney	18½
4	2nd Guest Bedroom & Ensuite	Kingi & Caro	28½	Luke & Ebony	20½
5	Study, Guest Powder Room & Laundry	Kingi & Caro	28½	Suzi & Voni	19½
6	Living Room	Luke & Ebony	23½	Dean & Shay	12^{[e]}
7	Kitchen	Kingi & Caro	29	Suzi & Voni	25
8	Dining Room & Foyer	Andrew & Whitney	26	Suzi & Voni	16
9	Terrace & Re-Do Room	Dean & Shay	28½	Suzi & Voni	21
10	Challenge Apartment: Room 1	Dean & Shay	29	Suzi & Voni	22½
11	Challenge Apartment: Room 2	Dean & Shay	30	Kingi & Caro	27½

Week	Room	Result				
Week	Room	Room Winner	2nd Couple	3rd Couple	4th Couple	Last Couple
1	Main Ensuite	Dean & Shay	Kingi & Caro	Andrew & Whitney	Suzi & Voni	Luke & Ebony
2	1st Guest Bedroom & Ensuite	Dean & Shay	Kingi & Caro	Suzi & Voni	Andrew & Whitney	Luke & Ebony
3	Master Bedroom & Walk-in-Robe	Suzi & Voni	Kingi & Caro	Dean & Shay	Luke & Ebony	Andrew & Whitney
4	2nd Guest Bedroom & Ensuite	Kingi & Caro	Suzi & Voni	Dean & Shay	Andrew & Whitney	Luke & Ebony
5	Study, Guest Powder Room & Laundry	Kingi & Caro	Luke & Ebony	Dean & Shay	Andrew & Whitney	Suzi & Voni
6	Living Room	Luke & Ebony	Andrew & Whitney	Kingi & Caro	Suzi & Voni	Dean & Shay^{[e]}
7	Kitchen	Kingi & Caro	Dean & Shay	Luke & Ebony	Andrew & Whitney	Suzi & Voni
8	Dining Room & Foyer	Andrew & Whitney	Kingi & Caro	Dean & Shay	Luke & Ebony	Suzi & Voni
9	Terrace & Re-Do Room	Dean & Shay	Kingi & Caro	Luke & Ebony	Andrew & Whitney	Suzi & Voni
10	Challenge Apartment: Room 1	Dean & Shay	Kingi & Caro	Luke & Ebony	Andrew & Whitney	Suzi & Voni
11	Challenge Apartment: Room 2	Dean & Shay	Andrew & Whitney	Suzi & Voni	Luke & Ebony	Kingi & Caro

=== Judges' scores ===
Colour key:
Highest Score
Lowest Score

Summary of judges' scores
Week	Area(s)	Scores	Teams				
Week	Area(s)	Scores	Kingi & Caro	Andrew & Whitney	Suzi & Voni	Luke & Ebony	Dean & Shay
1	Main Ensuite	Darren	9½	9	8	7½	9½
1	Main Ensuite	Shaynna	9	9	8	7½	9½
1	Main Ensuite	Neale	9	8½	8	7½	9½
1	Main Ensuite	Total	27½	26½	24	22½	28½
2	1st Guest Bedroom & Ensuite	Darren	9	6½	8½	6	9
2	1st Guest Bedroom & Ensuite	Shaynna	9	6	7	6	9
2	1st Guest Bedroom & Ensuite	Neale	8½	6	7½	6	9½
2	1st Guest Bedroom & Ensuite	Total	26½	18½	23	18	27½
3	Master Bedroom & Walk-in Robe	Darren	9	6	10	7½	8
3	Master Bedroom & Walk-in Robe	Shaynna	9	6	10	7	8
3	Master Bedroom & Walk-in Robe	Neale	9½	6½	10	7½	7
3	Master Bedroom & Walk-in Robe	Total	27½	18½	30	22	23
4	2nd Guest Bedroom & Ensuite	Darren	9	8½	9	7	9
4	2nd Guest Bedroom & Ensuite	Shaynna	9½	8	9½	6½	8½
4	2nd Guest Bedroom & Ensuite	Neale	10	7	9½	7	9
4	2nd Guest Bedroom & Ensuite	Total	28½	23½	28	20½	26½
5	Study, Guest Powder Room & Laundry	Darren	9½	9	7	9	8½
5	Study, Guest Powder Room & Laundry	Shaynna	9½	8	6½	9	8
5	Study, Guest Powder Room & Laundry	Neale	9½	7½	6	9½	9
5	Study, Guest Powder Room & Laundry	Total	28½	24½	19½	27½	25½
6	Living Room	Darren	7	8	6	7	4
6	Living Room	Shaynna	6½	7½	6	8	4
6	Living Room	Neale	6½	7½	6	8½	4
6	Living Room	Total	20	23	18	23½	12^{[e]}
7	Kitchen	Romy	9½	8½	8½	9	9½
7	Kitchen	Shaynna	9½	8½	8½	8½	9½
7	Kitchen	Neale	10	8½	8	9½	9½
7	Kitchen	Total	29	25½	25	27	28½
8	Dining Room & Foyer	Darren	8½	9	6	7	7½
8	Dining Room & Foyer	Shaynna	8½	8½	5	6	6½
8	Dining Room & Foyer	Neale	8½	8½	5	6	7
8	Dining Room & Foyer	Total	25½	26	16	19	21
9	Terrace & Re-Do Room^{[f]}	Darren	9	8	7	8	9
9	Terrace & Re-Do Room^{[f]}	Shaynna	9	8	7	8	9½
9	Terrace & Re-Do Room^{[f]}	Neale	9	8	7	8	10
9	Terrace & Re-Do Room^{[f]}	Total	27	24	21	24	28½
10	Challenge Apartment: Room 1	Darren	9½	8	7½	8½	9½
10	Challenge Apartment: Room 1	Shaynna	9½	8	7	8½	9½
10	Challenge Apartment: Room 1	Neale	9½	8	8	8½	10
10	Challenge Apartment: Room 1	Total	28½	24	22½	25½	29
11	Challenge Apartment: Room 2	Darren	9½	10	9½	9½	10
11	Challenge Apartment: Room 2	Shaynna	9	10	10	9	10
11	Challenge Apartment: Room 2	Neale	9	9½	9½	9½	10
11	Challenge Apartment: Room 2	Total	27½	29½	29	28	30

=== Challenge Apartment ===
Week 10
Score Rank	Room 1		Prize^{[g]}
Score Rank	Team	Room	Prize^{[g]}
1	Dean & Shay	Bedroom 3 Ensuite	$15,000
2	Kingi & Caro	Bedroom 3	$10,000
3	Luke & Ebony	Bedroom 2	$5,000
4	Andrew & Whitney	Bedroom 2 Ensuite	$0
5	Suzi & Voni	Master Ensuite	$0
Week 11
Score Rank	Room 2		Prize^{[j]}
Score Rank	Team	Room	Prize^{[j]}
1	Dean & Shay	Living Room	3rd^{[k]}
2	Andrew & Whitney	Dining Room	4th
3	Suzi & Vonni	Master Bedroom	2nd
4	Luke & Ebony	Kitchen	5th
5	Kingi & Caro	Study/ Laundry/ Powder Room	1st

Contestants	Rooms	Prize Money	Decision	
Contestants	Rooms	Prize Money	Repair Apartment	Money Off Reserve
Dean & Shay	Bedroom 3 Ensuite & Living Room	$15,000		
Kingi & Caro	Bedroom 3 & Study/Laundry/ Powder Room	$10,000		
Luke & Ebony	Bedroom 2 & Kitchen	$5,000		
Andrew & Whitney	Bedroom 2 Ensuite & Dining Room	$0		
Suzi & Voni	Master Ensuite & Master Bedroom	$0		

=== Challenge Scores ===
Summary of challenge scores
Week	Challenge	Reward	Teams				
Week	Challenge	Reward	Kingi & Caro	Andrew & Whitney	Suzi & Voni	Luke & Ebony	Dean & Shay
1	24-hour room challenge	Pick which level they want	Lvl 1 (5)	Lvl 2 (7)	Lvl 3 (20)	Lvl 4 (24)	Lvl 5 (27)
2	—N/a						
3	Designer bed head challenge	Joinery for walk-in wardrobe paid off & A piece of Christian Cole furniture	—	—	1st	—	—
4	—N/a						
5	Coffee Challenge^{[d]}	$10,000 ($5,000 each)	—	1st	—	1st	—
6	Signature Scented Candle Challenge	$10,000 & their candle sold Australia wide in David Jones Stores	—	—	—	1st	—
7	Supermarket Rush Challenge	$2,000	—	—	1st	—	—
8	Aldi Cooking Challenge	$10,000	—	—	—	—	1st
9	—N/a						
10	Construction Karoke Challenge	A Professional Painter for 8 hours & a $1600 Soundbar	1st	—	—	—	—
11	—N/a						

=== Auction ===
Rank	Couple	Reserve	Auction Result	Profit	Total Winnings	Auction Order
1	Dean & Shay	$1.645m	$2.300m	$655,000	$755,000	3rd
2	Luke & Ebony	$1.560m	$2.200m	$640,000	$640,000	5th
3	Kingi & Caro	$1.330m	$1.735m	$405,000	$405,000	1st
4	Andrew & Whitney	$1.400m	$1.790m	$390,000	$390,000	4th
5	Suzi & Voni	$1.480m	$1.829m	$349,000	$349,000	2nd

== Ratings ==
The Block: Blocktagon metropolitan viewership and nightly position Colour key: – Highest rating during the series – Lowest rating during the series
Week	Episode		Original airdate	Timeslot	Viewers (millions)^{[a]}	Nightly rank^{[a]}	Source
1	1	"Let's Begin!"	6 September 2015	Sunday 7:00 pm	1.074	#4	
1	2	"Who Gets The Penthouse?"	7 September 2015	Monday 7:30 pm	0.932	#6	
1	3	"Bathroom Ideas A Plenty"	8 September 2015	Tuesday 7:30 pm	0.833	#9	
1	4	"The Truth Comes Out"	9 September 2015	Wednesday 7:30 pm	0.748	#13	
2	5	"Master Ensuite Room Reveal"	13 September 2015	Sunday 7:00 pm	1.037	#5	
2	6	"Bedroom Begins"	14 September 2015	Monday 7:30 pm	0.891	#9	
2	7	"Game Plays On The Block"	15 September 2015	Tuesday 7:30 pm	0.838	#9	
2	8	"Who Said It Was Tacky?"	16 September 2015	Wednesday 7:30 pm	0.807	#11	
3	9	"Guest Bedrooms & Ensuite Reveal"	20 September 2015	Sunday 7:00 pm	1.037	#5	
3	10	"Master Bedroom Week Begins"	21 September 2015	Monday 7:30 pm	0.951	#10	
3	11	"Life Lessons On A Building Site"	22 September 2015	Tuesday 7:30 pm	0.858	#8	
3	12	"Designer Bed Head Challenge"	23 September 2015	Wednesday 7:30 pm	0.753	#12	
4	13	"Master Bedrooms Revealed"	27 September 2015	Sunday 7:00 pm	1.052	#2	
4	14	"Neale And Darren Host Brunch"	28 September 2015	Monday 7:30 pm	0.947	#6	
4	15	"Budget Blow Outs"	29 September 2015	Tuesday 7:30 pm	0.855	#9	
4	16	"Shelley And Scotty's Mid Week Visit"	30 September 2015	Wednesday 7:30 pm	0.776	#10	
5	17	"Bedroom And Ensuite Reveal"	5 October 2015	Monday 7:30 pm^{[c]}	1.021	#5	
5	18	"Triple Room Reno"	6 October 2015	Tuesday 7:30 pm	0.924	#9	
5	19	"Blocktagon Blues"	7 October 2015	Wednesday 7:30 pm	0.837	#9	
5	20	"Coffee Challenge With Colin And Justin"	8 October 2015	Thursday 7:30 pm	0.721	#9	
6	21	"Triple Room Reveal"	11 October 2015	Sunday 7:00 pm	1.156	#4	
6	22	"Scotty's Shock Announcement"	12 October 2015	Monday 7:30 pm	0.999	#7	
6	23	"Budget Blues And Bonuses"	13 October 2015	Tuesday 7:30 pm	0.949	#9	
6	24	"Challenge Day"	14 October 2015	Wednesday 7:30 pm	0.872	#9	
7	25	"Living Room Reveal"	18 October 2015	Sunday 7:00 pm	1.140	#1	
7	26	"Kitchen Week Begins"	19 October 2015	Monday 7:30 pm	1.078	#2	
7	27	"Suzi & Vonni Lag Behind"	20 October 2015	Tuesday 7:30 pm	0.969	#7	
7	28	"Supermarket Rush Challenge"	21 October 2015	Wednesday 7:30 pm	0.801	#10	
8	29	"Kitchens Completed"	25 October 2015	Sunday 7:00 pm	1.238	#1	
8	30	"Dining Room And Foyer Week Begins"	26 October 2015	Monday 7:30 pm	1.016	#6	
8	31	"$10,000 Challenge"	27 October 2015	Tuesday 7:30 pm	0.983	#5	
8	32	"Budget Highs And Lows"	28 October 2015	Wednesday 7:30 pm	0.945	#6	
9	33	"Dining Rooms And Foyers Revealed"	1 November 2015	Sunday 7:00 pm	1.209	#1	
9	34	"Terraces And Tantrums"	2 November 2015	Monday 7:30 pm	0.962	#6	
9	35	"Terraces And Re-do Rooms"	3 November 2015	Tuesday 7:30 pm	1.033	#8	
9	36	"Budget Woes And Break-ups"	4 November 2015	Wednesday 7:30 pm	1.026	#2	
10	37	"Terraces And Re-Do Revealed"	8 November 2015	Sunday 7:00 pm	1.355	#1	
10	38	"One Apartment Five Couples"	9 November 2015	Monday 7:30 pm	1.024	#1	
10	39	"Battle Of The Builders"	10 November 2015	Tuesday 7:30 pm	0.985	#6	
10	40	"Surprise Not To Miss"	11 November 2015	Wednesday 7:30 pm	1.037	#1	
11	41	"Challenge Apartment Reveal"	16 November 2015	Monday 8:30 pm^{[h]}^{[i]}	0.945	#7	
11	42	"The Final Rooms Begin"	17 November 2015	Tuesday 8:30 pm^{[h]}	0.861	#6	
11	43	"Go Karting And Paint Partying"	18 November 2015	Wednesday 7:30 pm	0.922	#5	
11	44	"Team Work Proves Difficult"	22 November 2015	Sunday 7:00 pm	1.226	#1	
12	45	"Final Rooms Revealed"	23 November 2015	Monday 7:30 pm	1.107	#1	
12	46	"Open For Inspection"	24 November 2015	Tuesday 7:30 pm	0.960	#4	
12	47	"Grand Final/ Auctions"	25 November 2015	Wednesday 7:30 pm	1.579	#2	
12	47	"Winner Announced"	25 November 2015	Wednesday 7:30 pm	1.812	#1	

== Controversy ==
On 10 November 2015, it was reported that contestant Suzi Taylor had collapsed on set, a Nine Network spokeswoman Victoria Buchan said: "Suzi was suffering from exhaustion after a busy day with The Block open for inspections.", but on 12 November 2015, Ms Taylor had a photo captured of her naked on a boat after oaks day in Melbourne, it had then been reported that her collapse was caused by "non-stop partying" throughout the Spring Racing Carnival and not exhaustion, due to this Ms Taylor was "canned" by Nine with all her promotional commitments being cut off until after the auction.

Ms Taylor has since been threatened to lose her payout of $174,500 after ignoring the terms her contract which states she shall not undertake any media interviews without the program's consent until her contract with Channel Nine is up.

== Notes ==
- ^{a} Ratings data used is from OzTAM and represents the live and same day average viewership from the 5 largest Australian metropolitan centres (Sydney, Melbourne, Brisbane, Perth and Adelaide).
- ^{b} Luke & Ebony were former elimination contestants on Triple Threat, but they did not make it through
- ^{c} Aired on Monday due to NRL Grand Final
- ^{d} In the Coffee Challenge, teams had to create a cafe concept which will be created on the first level of The Block, Luke & Ebony and Andrew and Whitney both won. The cafe will have a combined name of both of their cafe names, Luke & Ebony "Mr Bisley", Andrew & Whitney "A Shot of Zen" will become "Mister Zen"
- ^{e} Shay and Dean received low scores because they couldn't finish their room due to swapping their Living Room with the kitchen
- ^{f} Re-Do Rooms:
  Kingi & Caro - Living Room
  Dean & Shay - Living Room & Foyer
  Andrew & Whitney - Master Bedroom
  Suzi & Voni - Living Room & Foyer
  Luke & Ebony- Master Bedroom & Foyer
  The winner of this room received $10,000 to put in their apartment which is a gift to the buyer of their apartment
- ^{g} The contestants have 2 choices with the prize money they have won. these are:
  •Spend the money to fix their apartments or;
  •Take it off their reserve
- ^{h} Timeslot changed due to the Cricket Test
- ^{i} Aired on Monday due to Cricket Test
- ^{j} In order of winning, the contestants chose their auction order
- ^{k} Along with being first to pick their auction order, the winner will receive a brand new Suzuki Grand Vitara to go in their Apartments garage which will be a gift to the buyer of their apartment
- ^{l} Andrew & Whitney announced during the Grand Final that they had ended their relationship
