= 1986 WAFL season =

Australian rules football season

- Teams: 8
- Premiers: Subiaco; 6th premiership
- Minor premiers: Subiaco; 7th minor premiership
- Sandover Medallist: Mark Bairstow (South Fremantle)
- Bernie Naylor Medallist: Mick Rea (Perth)

Attendance
- Matches played: 88
- Total attendance: 731,709 (8,315 per match)

The 1986 WAFL season was the 102nd season of the various incarnations of the West Australian Football League. It was the last season before the introduction of the West Coast Eagles in the VFL which would relegate the WAFL to a second-level league from 1987, and already all WAFL clubs were in severe financial difficulties as attendances were stagnant at best since 1970 and the financial power of wealthy VFL clubs drew most top players away and left below-market transfer fees as WAFL clubs' inadequate main income source.

There was also controversy over an attempt to play the Round 7 match between West Perth and Claremont on Mother's Day (11 May) which was vigorously opposed by young families, and the game was played on the Saturday, and the WAFL admitted mid-season that changes to its schedules with more matches in major rural centres and matches at night at the WACA (Note: As of 1986, the WACA had not been used for any WA(N)FL match since Perth ceased playing its home games there at the end of the 1958 season.) were needed to counter the competition's dwindling appeal. WAFL chairman Roy Annear initially proposed to play two games a season in large towns like Geraldton, Bunbury and Kalgoorlie, although in modern times games in rural areas have been spread out to smaller centres at a lower frequency.

On the field, 1986 saw financially crippled Perth, whose reserves had in 1985 made the Demons' first finals appearance in any grade since 1978, build upon this under Mal Brown to reach the preliminary final. The loss of players to the VFL, however, prevented Perth building upon this in subsequent seasons and they have remained almost continuously a cellar-dweller since. East Fremantle and Subiaco, clearly the best teams in 1985, were even more dominant in 1986, though there was an unexpected end when hot favourites East Fremantle were thrashed in the Grand Final. Claremont, disappointing in 1984 and 1985, were spectacular early in 1986 before injuries to key players and form lapses saw a catastrophic fall from second with seven straight defeats.

Swan Districts, who had achieved a mini-dynasty from 1980 to 1984 with 88 wins from 118 matches, declined from third to their fourteenth wooden spoon, as injuries to key players and loss of form by veteran Kevin Taylor could only rarely be covered. South Fremantle, possessing the severest financial problems in the WAFL, also suffered from clouds over Don Haddow's coaching future and disputes with the Fremantle Council over Fremantle Oval producing proposals the Bulldogs move to a multi-sport stadium in Cockburn. The Bulldogs suffered their worst season since 1972 and held no opponent under 100 points until the closing round.

== Clubs ==
Club	Coach	Captain	Best and fairest	Leading goalkicker
Claremont	Graham Moss	Steve Malaxos	Darrell Panizza	John Scott (72)
East Fremantle	Ron Alexander	Brian Peake	Paul Harding	Colin Waterson (64)
East Perth	Greg Brehaut (sacked after Round 7); Gerard McNeill	Kevin Bryant (retired after Round 10); Russell Sparks	Craig Starcevich	Phil Bradmore (40)
Perth	Mal Brown	Robert Wiley	Robert Wiley	Mick Rea (90)
South Fremantle	Don Haddow	Mark Bairstow	Mark Bairstow	Craig Edwards (52)
Subiaco	Haydn Bunton, Jr.	Neil Taylor	Laurie Keene	Stephen Sells (74)
Swan Districts	John Todd	Don Langsford	Peter Sartori	Don Holmes (37)
West Perth	John Wynne	Les Fong	Dan Foley	Dan Foley (46)

== Home-and-away season ==
=== Round 1 (Easter weekend) ===
	Round 1
Saturday, 29 March	Perth 13.15 (93)	drew with	West Perth 13.15 (93)	Lathlain Park (crowd: 8121)
Saturday, 29 March	East Fremantle 12.11 (83)	def. by	Subiaco 18.9 (117)	East Fremantle Oval (crowd: 10118)
Monday, 31 March	East Perth 22.12 (144)	def. by	Swan Districts 21.20 (146)	Perth Oval (crowd: 10405)
Monday, 31 March	Claremont 33.18 (216)	def.	South Fremantle 10.9 (69)	Claremont Oval (crowd: 7855)
Swan Districts' comeback from 52 points behind at half-time to win was a WA(N)FL record and equaled Collingwood's 1970 record against St. Kilda. Former East Fremantle rover Kevin Taylor led the Swans' comeback with 25 kicks, 13 marks and 5.4 (34).; Claremont recorded their highest score and biggest win over South Fremantle, as the Tigers' brilliant centreline led by the returning Steve Malaxos decimated the Bulldogs.

=== Round 2 ===
	Round 2
Saturday, 5 April	Subiaco 28.20 (188)	def.	East Perth 11.7 (73)	Subiaco Oval (crowd: 8818)
Saturday, 5 April	Swan Districts 17.12 (114)	def. by	Claremont 22.12 (144)	Bassendean Oval (crowd: 9614)
Saturday, 5 April	West Perth 17.17 (119)	def. by	East Fremantle 18.17 (125)	Leederville Oval (crowd: 8824)
Sunday, 6 April	Perth 18.13 (121)	def.	South Fremantle 15.19 (109)	Rushton Park (crowd: 7147)
Eight goals from John Scott – who had played most of 1985 at full-back – gave Claremont a second strong victory to suggest a Tigers rebound from a poor 1985.; Subiaco, by scoring 12.4 (76) to 1.1 (7), achieved the largest margin at quarter-time in open-age WA(N)FL football, though it was beaten in the underage 1944 season.; For the first time, the WAFL played a match at Rushton Park, Mandurah – from 1997 to become the home of ninth Westar Rules/WAFL club Peel Thunder.

=== Round 3 ===
	Round 3
Saturday, 12 April	South Fremantle 22.17 (149)	def.	West Perth 20.10 (130)	Fremantle Oval (crowd: 6827)
Saturday, 12 April	Subiaco 26.21 (177)	def.	Perth 16.14 (110)	Subiaco Oval (crowd: 8430)
Saturday, 12 April	Claremont 20.17 (137)	def. by	East Perth 21.14 (140)	Claremont Oval (crowd: 6021)
Saturday, 12 April	Swan Districts 14.16 (100)	def. by	East Fremantle 26.16 (172)	Bassendean Oval (crowd: 7807)
Despite eight goals from Rea and the loss of Phil Scott before the game and Neil Taylor after quarter-time, Subiaco's ability to rove to the Demon rucks gave them a convincing victory.; East Perth narrowly avoided a second fadeout defeat as they nearly failed to hold onto a 51-point lead during the middle of the second quarter, thanks to veteran Kevin Bryant's steadiness.

=== Round 4 ===
	Round 4
Saturday, 19 April	West Perth 20.16 (136)	def.	Swan Districts 15.12 (102)	Leederville Oval (crowd: 8203)
Saturday, 19 April	Subiaco 26.13 (169)	def.	South Fremantle 18.21 (129)	Subiaco Oval (crowd: 8571)
Saturday, 19 April	Perth 20.8 (128)	def.	Claremont 14.12 (96)	Lathlain Park (crowd: 6477)
Saturday, 19 April	East Perth 20.13 (133)	def. by	East Fremantle 24.5 (149)	Perth Oval (crowd: 6988)
After having won only 27 matches between 1980 and 1985, Perth claimed a prized scalp as they exploited Claremont's weakness at centre half-forward, whilst Craig Smith added to his reputation as a WAFL "tagger" by shutting down Malaxos.

=== Round 5 (Anzac Day) ===
	Round 5
Friday, 25 April	West Perth 14.17 (101)	def. by	East Perth 15.18 (108)	Subiaco Oval (crowd: 17529)
Saturday, 26 April	Perth 22.8 (140)	def.	Swan Districts 21.13 (139)	Lathlain Park (crowd: 7659)
Saturday, 26 April	Claremont 18.17 (125)	def.	Subiaco 9.15 (69)	Claremont Oval (crowd: 9050)
Saturday, 26 April	East Fremantle 27.15 (177)	def.	South Fremantle 16.21 (117)	East Fremantle Oval (crowd: 11005)
Despite losing their two top rovers, East Perth, with deputy rover Keith Wynne scoring 5.2 (32) and Starcevich controlling the ruck, hold the initiative for three quarters despite six goals from Dan Foley – four in a third quarter when West Perth looked like running away with the match.; 9.2 (56) from Chris Stainowsky allows Perth to come back from 44 points behind to a thrilling victory, after Swan Districts played almost flawless football in the first half.; Claremont's gamble to play David O'Connell at centre half-forward due to the suspension of Scott and concede a ruck advantage to Subiaco paid off as the fleet-footed Mitchell, Peter Davidson and Panizza ran Subiaco off their feet on the ball and O'Connell kicked five goals to end the Lions' unbeaten record.

=== Round 6 ===
	Round 6
Saturday, 3 May	West Perth 17.6 (108)	def. by	Subiaco 25.20 (170)	Leederville Oval (crowd: 8217)
Saturday, 3 May	South Fremantle 10.9 (69)	def. by	Swan Districts 25.15 (165)	Fremantle Oval (crowd: 6174)
Saturday, 3 May	Perth 18.17 (125)	def.	East Perth 15.12 (102)	Subiaco Oval (crowd: 8215)
Saturday, 3 May	Claremont 21.14 (140)	def.	East Fremantle 12.11 (83)	Claremont Oval (crowd: 8505)
Perth, kept in the match by unheralded wingmen Joe Sanostefano and Glen Moir, came back to run over the Royals as their forward trio of Rea, Ryder and Stasinowsky took charge with seven last-quarter goals between them.; Another brilliant display by Malaxos and Mitchell drove Claremont to an outstanding victory, showing their Subiaco victory as no fluke. At one point Mitchell, being treated by a trainer for a calf injury, ran off and made a handball that produced a goal with the next kick.

=== Round 7 ===
	Round 7
Saturday, 10 May	Swan Districts 16.10 (106)	def. by	Subiaco 16.13 (109)	Bassendean Oval (crowd: 7390)
Saturday, 10 May	East Perth 15.18 (108)	def. by	South Fremantle 17.25 (127)	Perth Oval (crowd: 4622)
Saturday, 10 May	West Perth 20.11 (131)	def.	Claremont 19.14 (128)	Leederville Oval (crowd: 5885)
Saturday, 10 May	East Fremantle 26.16 (172)	def.	Perth 12.9 (81)	East Fremantle Oval (crowd: 7112)
Peter Sartori at centre half-forward leads a nine-goal last quarter that nearly produces a remarkable comeback before Warren Dean kicks the winner for Subiaco with thirty seconds remaining.; In a last quarter that ran thirty-eight minutes, after veteran George Michalczyk was carried from the field because of a concussion. West Perth came back to steal the match with 7.4 (46) to 0.3 (3) as the Bewick brothers, Foley, Greg Evans, Peter Menaglio and John Gastev suddenly slipped into action as Claremont stopped to a walk.

=== Round 8 ===
	Round 8
Saturday, 17 May	West Perth 19.11 (125)	def.	Perth 14.17 (101)	Leederville Oval (crowd: 6993)
Saturday, 17 May	Swan Districts 23.21 (159)	def.	East Perth 12.12 (84)	Bassendean Oval (crowd: 8081)
Saturday, 17 May	South Fremantle 9.12 (66)	def. by	Claremont 25.17 (167)	Fremantle Oval (crowd: 5920)
Saturday, 17 May	Subiaco 21.11 (137)	def.	East Fremantle 16.16 (112)	Subiaco Oval (crowd: 11640)
A second win for Subiaco over their 1985 conquerors was marred by the investigation of Shark rover David Bushell for pushing Subiaco trainer Barry Winzer. It was not reported by any umpire, but Winzer suffered major injuries to his cheek, left knee, chest and neck and Bushell was suspended for five matches on 28 May.; The return from injury of veteran strongman Garry Sidebottom allowed Swan Districts to form a combination reminiscent of their 1982/83/84 premiership days, as he and Holmes combined for fourteen goals, leaving Swans six points from fourth with a strong percentage.

=== Round 9 ===
	Round 9
Saturday, 24 May	Perth 23.15 (153)	def.	South Fremantle 15.14 (104)	Leederville Oval (crowd: 5928)
Saturday, 24 May	East Perth 10.18 (78)	def. by	Subiaco 23.15 (153)	Perth Oval (crowd: 6158)
Saturday, 24 May	Claremont 16.32 (128)	def.	Swan Districts 9.10 (64)	Claremont Oval (crowd: 10298)
Saturday, 24 May	East Fremantle 21.20 (146)	def.	West Perth 10.18 (78)	East Fremantle Oval (crowd: 7142)
Claremont's 32 behinds was the most in a match at Claremont Oval, but it was the Tiger defence led by Guy McKenna, Larry Kickett and Geoff Miles that dominated, holding a powerful Swan attack to 2.5 (17) in the first half in perfect conditions.

=== Round 10 (Foundation Day) ===
	Round 10
Saturday, 31 May	Swan Districts 15.15 (105)	def. by	Perth 21.18 (144)	Bassendean Oval (crowd: 10218)
Saturday, 31 May	West Perth 22.18 (150)	def.	East Perth 14.13 (97)	Leederville Oval (crowd: 8127)
Monday, 2 June	Subiaco 14.26 (110)	def.	Claremont 7.20 (62)	Subiaco Oval (crowd: 21088)
Monday, 2 June	South Fremantle 8.10 (58)	def. by	East Fremantle 23.14 (152)	Fremantle Oval (crowd: 9275)
Superb tagging of Malaxos and Mitchell permitted the Lions to hold Claremont to ten behinds in the second half, as the return of Scott forced Tiger forward David O'Connell away from centre half-forward.; East Fremantle recorded its biggest open-age victory over its derby rivals, (Note: In Round 17 of 1944 East Fremantle beat a winless under-19 South Fremantle team by 201 points.) surpassing a 90-point margin from 1934.

=== Round 11 ===
	Round 11
Saturday, 7 June	West Perth 20.16 (136)	def.	Swan Districts 19.13 (127)	Subiaco Oval (crowd: 8294)
Saturday, 7 June	South Fremantle 12.9 (81)	def. by	Subiaco 25.14 (164)	Fremantle Oval (crowd: 4320)
Saturday, 7 June	Claremont 23.13 (151)	def.	Perth 14.16 (100)	Claremont Oval (crowd: 7670)
Saturday, 7 June	East Perth 15.13 (103)	def. by	East Fremantle 24.19 (163)	Perth Oval (crowd: 4880)
Without Rea and with the previously problematic Tiger attack back at its best, Perth suffered a convincing defeat despite being only seven points behind late in the second quarter.; An unexpected move of Paul Mifka onto Sartori at half-time saved West Perth from a loss that would have looked embarrassing later, as he matched the big Swan's mobility whilst Phil Bradmore dominated at the other end.

=== Round 12 ===
	Round 12
Saturday, 14 June	West Perth 17.14 (116)	def.	South Fremantle 16.14 (110)	Leederville Oval (crowd: 4130)
Saturday, 14 June	Perth 15.13 (103)	def. by	Subiaco 19.12 (126)	Lathlain Park (crowd: 4771)
Saturday, 14 June	East Perth 11.13 (79)	def. by	Claremont 19.11 (125)	Subiaco Oval (crowd: 4295)
Saturday, 14 June	East Fremantle 21.15 (141)	def.	Swan Districts 14.13 (97)	East Fremantle Oval (crowd: 4519)
South Fremantle produced their best effort to date, with Edwards and Bairstow outstanding – but a third-quarter lapse allowed the Falcons to win and enter the four for the first time in 1986.

=== Round 13 ===
	Round 13
Saturday, 21 June	Subiaco 27.18 (180)	def.	Swan Districts 12.8 (80)	Subiaco Oval (crowd: 8002)
Saturday, 21 June	South Fremantle 15.16 (106)	def.	East Perth 14.17 (101)	Fremantle Oval (crowd: 4781)
Saturday, 21 June	Claremont 13.26 (104)	def. by	West Perth 16.13 (109)	Claremont Oval (crowd: 8807)
Saturday, 21 June	Perth 19.10 (124)	def.	East Fremantle 12.14 (86)	Lathlain Park (crowd: 7218)
Perth ended a sequence of nineteen consecutive scores over 100 by East Fremantle against them, the most such consecutive scores by one club against another. The Demons' feeling they could upset the depleted Sharks – without Brennan and Neesham as well as Bushell – was justified as the Sharks were never in the hunt apart from a third-quarter burst.; West Perth again won a thriller over the Tigers – this time holding on after scoring 7.5 (47) 0.3 (3) in thirty minutes centres around three-quarter time. Derek Kickett and Goulding both scored 1.5 (11) for the inaccurate Tigers, who lost Steve Malaxos to a knee injury for the rest of the home-and-away season.

=== Round 14 ===
	Round 14
Saturday, 28 June	Swan Districts 16.20 (116)	def.	South Fremantle 12.13 (85)	Bassendean Oval (crowd: 3861)
Saturday, 28 June	East Perth 17.14 (116)	def. by	Perth 20.14 (134)	Perth Oval (crowd: 4212)
Saturday, 28 June	East Fremantle 12.18 (90)	def. by	Claremont 16.18 (114)	East Fremantle Oval (crowd: 6414)
Sunday, 29 June	Subiaco 14.15 (99)	def.	West Perth 7.11 (53)	Kalgoorlie (crowd: 7139)
Claremont's ability to absorb East Fremantle's physical pressure ensured it takes second position from the Sharks, whose play possessed courage but no planning or method.; Superb displays by Brian Taylor, Laurie Keene and the Lions' defence, plus five goals by Phil Scott, placed Subiaco four wins clear at the top, and left West Perth a game from fourth.; This was the first WAFL match in Kalgoorlie, and the attendance, given the showery weather during travel to the game by rail, was higher than any previous figure for a football match in rural WA and produced a gate of $30,500, or $3,500 higher than the WAFL target.

=== Round 15 ===
	Round 15
Saturday, 5 July	Perth 20.18 (138)	def.	West Perth 6.15 (51)	Lathlain Park (crowd: 9031)
Saturday, 5 July	East Perth 17.20 (122)	def.	Swan Districts 13.6 (84)	Perth Oval (crowd: 4837)
Saturday, 12 July	Claremont 15.12 (102)	def.	South Fremantle 12.17 (89)	Subiaco Oval (crowd: 5630)
Saturday, 12 July	East Fremantle 17.13 (115)	def.	Subiaco 14.16 (100)	East Fremantle Oval (crowd: 10298)
Despite Perth coach Brown being charged with misconduct, the Demons crushed West Perth in slippery conditions to be temporarily second as Wiley – in the unfamiliar role of centreman – plus Barich and Santostefano took advantage of the Falcons' lack of commitment.; East Perth end a sequence of twenty games conceding over 100 points, which broke Perth's previous record of nineteen in 1982 and 1983, and still stands.; Subiaco's run of eight wins ended on a violently windy afternoon as the Lions were not able to goal against the wind until sixteen minutes into the final quarter, whilst Peake – after his State-of-Origin heroics at full-forward – and Waterson scored eleven between them.

=== State of Origin match ===
Western Australia vs Victoria
Tuesday, 8 July (1:45 pm)	Western Australia	def.	Victoria	Subiaco Oval (crowd: 39863)
4.4 (28); 9.5 (59); 15.10 (100); 21.11 (137)	Q1; Q2; Q3; Final	4.5 (29); 7.7 (49); 12.10 (82); 20.14 (134)	Umpires: Johnson (WA), Castle (VIC); Simpson Medal: Brad Hardie; Television broadcast: ABC1
Peake 7.2; Buckenara 5.2; MacNish 3.1; Rioli 2.1; Michael Mitchell 2.0; Baker, Wilson 1.1; Blackwell, Hardie 0.1	Goals	5.4 Weightman; 5.2 Royal; 4.2 Taylor; 3.1 Brereton; 1.0 Alvin, Bews, Healy
This match has often been regarded as the greatest State of Origin match ever played.

=== Round 16 ===
	Round 16
Saturday, 19 July	South Fremantle 23.15 (153)	def.	Perth 19.10 (124)	Fremantle Oval (crowd: 5202)
Saturday, 19 July	Subiaco 13.22 (100)	def.	East Perth 12.8 (80)	Subiaco Oval (crowd: 6711)
Saturday, 19 July	Swan Districts 17.9 (111)	def.	Claremont 16.11 (107)	Bassendean Oval (crowd: 4995)
Saturday, 19 July	West Perth 9.13 (67)	def. by	East Fremantle 15.17 (107)	Leederville Oval (crowd: 6680)
Returns to form by Taylor and Kimberley allowed Swans to grasp an exciting last-minute victory after having been fifteen points behind with ten minutes remaining in an always-close match.

=== Round 17 ===
	Round 17
Saturday, 26 July	Perth 20.16 (136)	def.	Swan Districts 20.14 (134)	Subiaco Oval (crowd: 6011)
Saturday, 26 July	East Perth 14.12 (96)	def.	West Perth 11.6 (72)	Perth Oval (crowd: 6111)
Saturday, 26 July	Claremont 13.10 (88)	def. by	Subiaco 13.22 (100)	Claremont Oval (crowd: 8504)
Saturday, 26 July	East Fremantle 29.21 (195)	def.	South Fremantle 9.5 (59)	East Fremantle Oval (crowd: 8622)
33 kicks, sixteen handballs and four goals by Gerard Neesham was regarded as the finest individual performance of the season, and led East Fremantle to a second record open-age win over South. (Note: In Round 17 of 1944 East Fremantle beat a winless under-19 South Fremantle team by 201 points.) Darren Bennett, in his first match for 1986, kicked five goals.; Veteran Wiley, who had shown superb skills tackling and in attack, denied lowly Swan Districts a late victory in a brilliant match via an amazing low smother where he dived onto a boot, and then a similar tackle on a Swan defender to allow a crucial goal.

=== Round 18 ===
	Round 18
Saturday, 2 August	West Perth 22.16 (148)	def.	Swan Districts 15.15 (105)	Leederville Oval (crowd: 4915)
Saturday, 2 August	South Fremantle 17.13 (115)	def.	Subiaco 15.15 (105)	Fremantle Oval (crowd: 4559)
Saturday, 2 August	Perth 22.20 (152)	def.	Claremont 16.11 (107)	Lathlain Park (crowd: 7502)
Saturday, 2 August	East Perth 17.11 (113)	def. by	East Fremantle 21.16 (142)	Subiaco Oval (crowd: 5435)
South Fremantle provided a huge upset to move off the bottom as the brilliant Bairstow and erratic Winmar (who had been in the reserves during June) plus a surprisingly solid defence held the Lions out all afternoon.

=== Round 19 ===
	Round 19
Saturday, 9 August	South Fremantle 24.18 (162)	def.	West Perth 16.11 (107)	Fremantle Oval (crowd: 5872)
Saturday, 9 August	Subiaco 11.18 (84)	def. by	Perth 21.10 (136)	Subiaco Oval (crowd: 9802)
Saturday, 9 August	Claremont 14.10 (94)	def. by	East Perth 22.11 (143)	Claremont Oval (crowd: 5190)
Saturday, 9 August	Swan Districts 13.16 (94)	def. by	East Fremantle 26.15 (171)	Bassendean Oval (crowd: 5444)
Rea's power and Ryder's pure speed exploited deficiencies in Subiaco's armour as the Lions did not run hard enough to compete without key defenders Wilkinson and Crutchfield.; A 12.3 (75) third quarter – East Perth's highest single-quarter score since 1974 – gave the Royals an easy win over a disappointing Claremont, for whom only 30-kick Daniel Panizza played to potential.

=== Round 20 ===
	Round 20
Saturday, 16 August	Swan Districts 12.14 (86)	def. by	Subiaco 22.22 (154)	Bassendean Oval (crowd: 5244)
Saturday, 16 August	East Perth 21.18 (144)	def.	South Fremantle 13.8 (86)	Perth Oval (crowd: 6850)
Saturday, 16 August	West Perth 18.24 (132)	def.	Claremont 12.11 (83)	Leederville Oval (crowd: 6922)
Saturday, 16 August	East Fremantle 24.16 (160)	def.	Perth 7.10 (52)	East Fremantle Oval (crowd: 9367)
A Perth team minus Rea and Watson failed to counter East Fremantle in Peake's three hundredth senior match. Half-forward Peter Wilson was the star, with four goals and numerous electrifying bursts, whilst George Christie was superb in a back pocket.; 34 kicks from Neil Taylor and seven goals each from Sells and Breman allowed Subiaco to crush Swans, scoring 14.12 (96) to 1.5 (11) in the first half. Garry Sidebottom ended his career by being crushed by Clint Brown and left the field injured with Swan Districts still goalless twelve minutes into the second quarter.; West Perth's convincing win over Claremont was the Tigers' fifth straight loss and left the former pacesetters in danger of losing their finals berth.; South Fremantle equaled East Perth's earlier-season record of conceding 100 points for twenty consecutive games; the streaker later ended in the last round.; At the East Perth versus South Fremantle match, the East Perth banner remained on the ground early in the match and produced confusion whereby John Worsfold kicked the ball through the East Perth goal and it was initially registered as a goal to the Royals, then to the Bulldogs – before the correct score of a behind to East Perth was added.

=== Round 21 ===
	Round 21
Saturday, 23 August	Subiaco 27.17 (179)	def.	West Perth 12.9 (81)	Subiaco Oval (crowd: 9916)
Saturday, 23 August	South Fremantle 21.16 (142)	def.	Swan Districts 12.12 (84)	Fremantle Oval (crowd: 5147)
Saturday, 23 August	Perth 16.15 (111)	def. by	East Perth 21.21 (147)	Lathlain Park (crowd: 6910)
Saturday, 23 August	Claremont 13.11 (89)	def. by	East Fremantle 27.14 (176)	Claremont Oval (crowd: 5768)
Breman, Sells and Dean combined for eighteen goals as Bunton kept all three close to the goal square. An unstoppable centreline and a powerful half-forward line of Georgiades and Langdon, Subiaco denied West Perth's dream of a finals berth in crushing style.; A powerhouse display with Bennett scoring 11.6 (72) after missing more than a season with injury allowed East Fremantle to crush an uncommitted Tiger outfit.

== Ladder ==
1986 WAFL ladder
Pos	Team	Pld	W	L	D	PF	PA	PP	Pts
1	Subiaco (P)	21	17	4	0	2790	2004	139.2	68
2	East Fremantle	21	16	5	0	2917	2092	139.4	64
3	Perth	21	12	8	1	2506	2537	98.8	50
4	Claremont	21	10	11	0	2507	2255	111.2	40
5	West Perth	21	9	11	1	2243	2529	88.7	38
6	East Perth	21	7	14	0	2311	2652	87.1	28
7	South Fremantle	21	7	14	0	2185	2916	74.9	28
8	Swan Districts	21	5	16	0	2318	2792	83.0	20

Rules for classification: 1) points; 2) percentage; 3) number of points for.
(P) Premiers

== Finals series ==
=== First semi-final ===
	First semi-final
Saturday, 30 August	Perth 24.18 (162)	def.	Claremont 13.11 (89)	Subiaco Oval (crowd: 21,037)
Despite the return of Mitchell and Malaxos, Claremont was uncompetitive against the Demons, who rebounded from two bad losses and never lost control.

=== Second semi-final ===
	Second semi-final
Saturday, 6 September	Subiaco 12.11 (83)	def. by	East Fremantle 20.13 (133)	Subiaco Oval (crowd: 25,535)
East Fremantle's Darren Bennett became the first player to kick ten or more goals in a WA(N)FL final, and made the Sharks red-hot favourites to equal Port Adelaide's 27 flags in the major Australian Rules leagues.

=== Preliminary final ===
	Preliminary final
Saturday, 13 September	Subiaco 26.12 (168)	def.	Perth 15.7 (97)	Subiaco Oval (crowd: 23,503)

=== Grand Final ===
1986 WAFL Grand Final
Saturday, 20 September	East Fremantle	def. by	Subiaco	Subiaco Oval (crowd: 38,389)
1.2 (8); 3.7 (25); 6.9 (45); 8.13 (61)	Q1; Q2; Q3; Final	6.3 (39); 13.4 (82); 17.8 (110); 19.16 (130)	Umpires: Ken O'Driscoll, Mike Ball; Simpson Medal: Mark Zanotti (Subiaco)
Bennett 2, Wilson 2, Waterson 2, Green, Mainwaring	Goals	Breman 4, Keene 3, Sells 3, Macnish 3, Dwayne Lamb 2, Dean, Carpenter, Brian Taylor, Neil Taylor
Harding, Neesham, Rowland, O'Sullivan, Mainwaring, Wilson, Solin	Best	Zanotti, Dwayne Lamb
Peter Wilson by field umpire O'Driscoll for striking Rod Willett in the third quarter	Reports	Stephen Sells by goal umpire Lester Cox for striking Scott Rowland in the second quarter
Subiaco crushed a powerful East Fremantle side to complete a rags-to-riches story over three seasons under Haydn Bunton, Jr., going from one win in 1982 (Note: Their lone win during 1982 was, ironically, against East Fremantle.) and four in 1983 to premiers.
