= The Block season 13 =

The Block
- Season 13
- No. of episodes: 52

Release
- Original network: Nine Network
- Original release: 30 July – 29 October 2017

Season chronology
- ← Previous; Season 12 Next → Season 14

The thirteenth season of Australian reality television series The Block premiered on 30 July 2017 on the Nine Network. Both hosts Scott Cam (host) and Shelley Craft (Challenge Master) returned from the previous season, as did the three judges: Neale Whitaker, Shaynna Blaze and Darren Palmer.

== Production ==
On 8 November 2016, The Block was renewed for a thirteenth season at Nine's upfronts. Applications for the thirteenth season of the series opened on January 9, 2017, with energetic couples aged between 18 and 65 years old being sought by casting agents. Filming for the season is scheduled to occur between April 2017 and July 2017. The casting call also specifies first round couples will be reduced to final participants in the first week of filming, which suggests Season 13 will feature an elimination round similar to that of Season 5.

On 11 March 2017, it was reported that a vacant block of land at 46 Regent Street, Elsternwick, had been purchased for $9.6 million back in December 2016, with plans approved to build a five lot subdivision, meaning for the first time ever, they would be building a property from the ground up, instead of renovating an existing building. On 17 March 2017, it was officially confirmed that 46 Regent Street Elsternwick will be the location of The Block's thirteenth season with filming to begin on 27 April 2017, however they will not be building a property from the ground up, as five old rundown weatherboard houses are being relocated to the location, meaning this will be the first time since the sixth season the contestants will renovate a house.

The Block’s open for inspection took place on Sunday, 15 October 2017. The Block auctions (or Block-tions) for the houses were held on Saturday, 28 October 2017. Elyse & Josh won the series with comedian Dave Hughes buying their property for over $3m.

== Contestants ==
This is the fifth season of The Block to have five couples instead of the traditional four couples. Each team will renovate a house which have each been relocated from different suburbs around Melbourne.

House^{[c]}		Couple	Age	Location	Relationship	Occupations
1	Pascoe Vale	Jason Price & Sarah Windebank	46 & 45	Melbourne, VIC	Married with children	Plumber & Nurse
2	Moonee Ponds	Clint & Hannah Amos	33 & 31	Townsville, QLD	Married with children	Property Sales & Groundcrew
3	Brunswick	Georgia & Ronnie Caceres	33 & 41	Perth, WA	Married with children	Clothing Designer & Plasterer
4	Preston	Mark "Sticks" Croker & Clint "Wombat" Price	31 & 38	South Coast, NSW	Best Mates	Photographer/Carpenter & Salesman
5	Brighton	Elyse Knowles & Josh Barker	24 & 28	Melbourne, VIC	Partners	Model & Carpenter

== Score history ==
Teams' progress through the competition
Scores:	Teams				
Scores:	Jason & Sarah	Clint & Hannah	Georgia & Ronnie	Sticks & Wombat	Elyse & Josh
Rooms	Scores				
Main Bathroom	24	16	25½	26½	27
1st Guest Bedroom	27	27	28	26½	27½
Kids Bedroom	27	22	29	25½	23
Teams Choice Room	21^{[e]}	28½	21	21	26½
Living & Dining Room	26½	23½	29½	20	29½^{[f]}
Master Bedroom, Ensuite & Walk-in Robe	0^{[g]}	25	28	24	28½
Kitchen	28½^{[g.1]}	26	28	26½	30^{[g.1]}
Hallway & Laundry	26½	22	24½	28½ ^{[h]}	27
2nd Guest Bedroom	28½	25	30	28	30
Backyard	27^{[i]}	22	25½	29	29½
Studio & Garage	26	27	29½	29	29
Frontyard	28	23½	25½	28½	26
Auction Order	2nd	5th	4th	3rd	1st
Auction Result	2nd	5th	3rd	4th	1st

=== Weekly Room Prize ===
Week	Room	Winning team	Prize
1	Main Bathroom	Elyse & Josh	$10,000 & one night luxury getaway from Stayz
2	1st Guest Bedroom	Georgia & Ronnie	$10,000 & one night luxury getaway from Stayz
3	Kids Bedroom	Georgia & Ronnie	$10,000, one night luxury getaway from Stayz & 1 point to take from a team's next room score
4	Teams Choice Room	Clint & Hannah	$10,000 & one night luxury getaway from Stayz
5	Living & Dining Room	Elyse & Josh	$10,000 split ($5,000 each) & one night luxury getaway sharehouse from Stayz
5	Living & Dining Room	Georgia & Ronnie	$10,000 split ($5,000 each) & one night luxury getaway sharehouse from Stayz
6	Master Bedroom, Ensuite & Walk-in Robe	Elyse & Josh	$10,000 & one night luxury getaway from Stayz
9	Kitchen	Elyse & Josh	$10,000 & one night luxury getaway from Stayz
9	Kitchen	Jason & Sarah	$10,000
8	Hallway & Laundry	Sticks & Wombat	$10,000 & one night luxury getaway from Stayz
9	2nd Guest Bedroom	Elyse & Josh	$10,000 each
9	2nd Guest Bedroom	Georgia & Ronnie	$10,000 each
10	Backyard	Elyse & Josh	$10,000 & one night luxury getaway from Stayz
11	Studio & Garage	Georgia & Ronnie	$10,000 & one night luxury getaway from Stayz
12	Frontyard	Sticks & Wombat	One night luxury getaway from Stayz

== Results ==
=== Judges' scores ===
Colour key:
Highest Score
Lowest Score

Summary of judges' scores
Week	Area(s)	Scores	Teams				
Week	Area(s)	Scores	Jason & Sarah	Clint & Hannah	Georgia & Ronnie	Sticks & Wombat	Elyse & Josh
1	Main Bathroom	Darren	8½	6½	9	9	9
1	Main Bathroom	Shaynna	7½	3	7½	9	8½
1	Main Bathroom	Neale	8	6½	9	8½	9½
1	Main Bathroom	Total	24	16	25½	26½	27
2	1st Guest Bedroom	Darren	9½	9½	9½	9	9
2	1st Guest Bedroom	Shaynna	8½	8½	9	8½	9
2	1st Guest Bedroom	Neale	9	9	9½	9	9½
2	1st Guest Bedroom	Total	27	27	28	26½	27½
3	Kids Bedroom	Darren	8½	7½	9½	8½	8½
3	Kids Bedroom	Shaynna	9	6½	9½	8½	7
3	Kids Bedroom	Neale	9½	8	10	8½	7½
3	Kids Bedroom	Total	26	22	29	25½	23
4	Teams Choice Room^{[d]}	Darren	8	9½	7	6	8½
4	Teams Choice Room^{[d]}	Shaynna	7	9½	7	6½	9
4	Teams Choice Room^{[d]}	Neale	7-1	9½	7	8½	9
4	Teams Choice Room^{[d]}	Total	21	28½	21	21	26½
5	Living & Dining Room	Darren	9	7½	9½	6½	9½
5	Living & Dining Room	Shaynna	8½	7½	10	6½	9½
5	Living & Dining Room	Neale	9	8½	10	7	9½+1
5	Living & Dining Room	Total	26½	23½	29½	20	29½^{[f]}
6	Master Bedroom, Ensuite & Walk-in Robe	Darren	0	8½	9½	8	9½
6	Master Bedroom, Ensuite & Walk-in Robe	Shaynna	0	8	9	8	9½
6	Master Bedroom, Ensuite & Walk-in Robe	Neale	0	8½	9½	8	9½
6	Master Bedroom, Ensuite & Walk-in Robe	Total	0^{[g]}	25	28	24	28½
7	Kitchen	Darren	9½	9	10	9	10
7	Kitchen	Shaynna	9½	8	9	8½	10
7	Kitchen	Neale	9½	9	9	9	10
7	Kitchen	Total	28½^{[g.1]}	26	28	26½	30^{[g.1]}
8	Hallway & Laundry	Darren	9	7	8	8½	9
8	Hallway & Laundry	Shaynna	8½	7	8	9	8½
8	Hallway & Laundry	Neale	9	8	8½	10+1	9½
8	Hallway & Laundry	Total	26½	22	24½	28½	27
9	2nd Guest Bedroom	Darren	9½	8½	10	9½	10
9	2nd Guest Bedroom	Shaynna	9½	8	10	9	10
9	2nd Guest Bedroom	Neale	9½	8½	10	9½	10
9	2nd Guest Bedroom	Total	28½	25	30	28	30
10	Backyard	Darren	9½	7	8½	10	10
10	Backyard	Shaynna	9	7	8	9	9½
10	Backyard	Neale	9½	8	9	10	10
10	Backyard	Total	27 ^{[i]}	22	25½	29	29½
11	Studio & Garage	Darren	8½	9	10	10	10
11	Studio & Garage	Shaynna	8	8	9½	9	9
11	Studio & Garage	Neale	9½	10	10	10	10
11	Studio & Garage	Total	26	27	29½	29	29
12	Frontyard	Darren	9½	8½	10	10	9½
12	Frontyard	Shaynna	9	7½	7½	9½	8½
12	Frontyard	Neale	9½	7½	8	9	8
12	Frontyard	Total	28	23½	25½	28½	26

=== Challenge scores ===
Summary of challenge scores
Week	Challenge		Reward	Teams				
Week	Challenge	Description	Reward	Jason & Sarah	Clint & Hannah	Georgia & Ronnie	Sticks & Wombat	Elyse & Josh
1	The 48-Hour Challenge	Renovate and style a bedroom	Pick which house they wanted	House 1 (3rd)	House 2 (5th)	House 3 (1st)^{[b]}	House 4 (4th)	House 5 (2nd)
3	Cubby House Maze Challenge	Find instructions in a maze & build a cubby house	$5000	—	—	—	1st	—
4	Bedroom Makeover Challenge	Makeover a Ronald McDonald House bedroom	$5000 & 1 bonus point	—	—	—	—	1st
5	Gnome Swapping Challenge	Swapping gnomes for products they'll sell at an auction with the money going to charity	$5,000	$28,900 (2nd)	$28,100 (3rd)	$26,900 (4th)	$45,750 (1st)	$24,950 (5th)
6	Creative Artwork Challenge	Create a piece of artwork for their Master Bedroom	$5,000	—	—	—	—	1st
7	Stayz Makeover Team Challenge	Makeover a bedroom & living room in a Stayz house	$5,000 per team & a Stayz getaway for their families	—N/a	Team South (1st)	Team South (1st)	Team North	Team North
8	Celebrity Cooking Challenge	Cook a signature meal for radio personalities Dave Hughes & Kate Langbroek	$5,000, have their meal on the Youfoodz menu & 1 bonus point	—	—	—	1st	—
9	Hotel Bedroom Makeover Challenge	Makeover a bedroom at The Whitt Hotel in Mt Buller	$20,000 overall	—	2nd ($6,000)	1st ($10,000)	—	3rd ($4,000)

=== Domain Prize ===
Each week during the weekly walkthrough, Alice Stolz from Domain will judge each team's current room. She judges each room on suitability, continuity and flow, functionality, progress & budget. The weekly winner will be awarded a $5,000 weekly prize that is split equally in cash and marketing with domain. Each week the points are tallied and the team at the end with the highest score will have themselves and their property featured on the cover of Domain Magazine.

Scores:	Teams				
Scores:	Jason & Sarah	Clint & Hannah	Georgia & Ronnie	Sticks & Wombat	Elyse & Josh
Rooms	Scores				
Main Bathroom	9	7	7	8	8
1st Guest Bedroom	5½	5	5½	7	6½
Kids Bedroom	7	7½	8½	8½	9
Teams Choice Room	7½	8	7	6½	6½
Living & Dining Room	7	7½	9	6½	8
Master Bedroom, Ensuite & Walk-in Robe	5	8½	7½	7½	8
Kitchen	6	5	9	8	9½
Hallway & Laundry	9	7	8½	8	8
2nd Guest Bedroom	8½	8	9½	9	9
Backyard	8½	8	9½	9	10
Studio & Garage	8½	8	9	8½	8
Running Total	81½	79½	90	86½	90½

=== Auction ===
Rank	Couple	Reserve	Auction Result	Profit	Total Winnings	Auction Order
1	Josh & Elyse	$2.620m	$3.067m	$447,000	$547,000	1st
2	Jason & Sarah	$2.620m	$3.007m	$387,000	$387,000	2nd
3	Ronnie & Georgia	$2.620m	$2.781m	$161,000	$161,000	4th
4	Sticks & Wombat	$2.520m	$2.650m	$130,000	$130,000	3rd
5	Clint & Hannah	$2.520m	$2.615m	$95,000	$95,000	5th

== Ratings ==
The Block 2017 metropolitan viewership and nightly position Colour key: – Highest rating during the series – Lowest rating during the series
Week	Episode		Original airdate	Timeslot	Viewers (millions)^{[a]}	Nightly rank^{[a]}	Source
1	1	"48 Hour Challenge"	30 July 2017	Sunday 7:00pm	1.117	4	
1	2	"48 Hour Challenge Reveal"	31 July 2017	Monday 7:30pm	1.259	2	
1	3	"Main Bathroom Week"	1 August 2017	Tuesday 7:30pm	1.044	3	
1	4	"Main Bathroom Week Continues"	2 August 2017	Wednesday 7:30pm	0.982	4	
2	5	"Main Bathrooms Revealed"	6 August 2017	Sunday 7:00pm	1.212	2	
2	6	"1st Guest Bedroom Begins"	7 August 2017	Monday 7:30pm	1.093	2	
2	7	"1st Guest Bedroom Continues"	8 August 2017	Tuesday 7:30pm	1.005	5	
2	8	"1st Guest Bedroom Takes Its Toll"	9 August 2017	Wednesday 7:30pm	0.975	5	
3	9	"1st Guest Bedrooms Revealed"	13 August 2017	Sunday 7:00pm	1.285	1	
3	10	"Kids Bedroom Begins"	14 August 2017	Monday 7:30pm	1.068	3	
3	11	"Kids Bedroom Continue & Challenge"	15 August 2017	Tuesday 7:30pm	1.067	1	
3	12	"Kids Bedroom and Walk Arounds"	16 August 2017	Wednesday 7:30pm	0.998	4	
4	13	"Kids Bedrooms Revealed"	20 August 2017	Sunday 7:00pm	1.349	1	
4	14	"Anything But a Bedroom Begins"	21 August 2017	Monday 7:30pm	1.139	1	
4	15	"Anything But a Bedroom Continues"	22 August 2017	Tuesday 7:30pm	1.043	2	
4	16	"Anything But a Bedroom Walk Arounds & Challenge"	23 August 2017	Wednesday 7:30pm	1.028	1	
5	17	"Anything But a Bedroom Reveals"	27 August 2017	Sunday 7:00pm	1.184	3	
5	18	"Living and Dining Begins"	28 August 2017	Monday 7:30pm	1.101	1	
5	19	"Living and Dining Continues"	29 August 2017	Tuesday 7:30pm	1.093	1	
5	20	"Living and Dining Walk Arounds & Challenge"	30 August 2017	Wednesday 7:30pm	0.957	3	
6	21	"Living and Dinings Revealed"	3 September 2017	Sunday 7:00pm	1.197	2	
6	22	"Master Suite Begins"	4 September 2017	Monday 7:30pm	1.175	1	
6	23	"Master Suite Continues and Challenge"	5 September 2017	Tuesday 7:30pm	1.069	1	
6	24	"Master Suite and Walk Arounds"	6 September 2017	Wednesday 7:30pm	1.038	1	
7	25	"Master Suites Revealed"	10 September 2017	Sunday 7:00pm	1.701	1	
7	26	"Kitchens Begin"	11 September 2017	Monday 7:30pm	1.316	1	
7	27	"Kitchens Continue and Challenge"	12 September 2017	Tuesday 7:30pm	1.178	1	
7	28	"Kitchens and Challenge Continues"	13 September 2017	Wednesday 7:30pm	1.116	1	
8	29	"Kitchens Revealed"	17 September 2017	Sunday 7:00pm	1.545	1	
8	30	"Hallways & Laundries Begin"	18 September 2017	Monday 7:30pm	1.326	1	
8	31	"Hallway & Laundry Continues and Challenge"	19 September 2017	Tuesday 7:30pm	1.241	1	
8	32	"Hallway & Laundry and Challenge Continues"	20 September 2017	Wednesday 7:30pm	1.026	1	
9	33	"Hallways & Laundries Revealed"	24 September 2017	Sunday 7:00pm	1.395	1	
9	34	"2nd Guest Bedroom Begins"	25 September 2017	Monday 7:30pm	1.122	1	
9	35	"2nd Guest Bedroom & Challenge"	26 September 2017	Tuesday 7:30pm	1.205	1	
9	36	"2nd Guest Bedroom Continues"	27 September 2017	Wednesday 7:30pm	1.135	1	
10	37	"2nd Guest Bedrooms Revealed"	2 October 2017	Monday 7:30pm	1.404	1	
10	38	"Backyard Begins"	3 October 2017	Tuesday 7:30pm	1.344	1	
10	39	"Backyards Continue"	4 October 2017	Wednesday 7:30pm	1.352	1	
10	40	"Backyards Continue & Walk Arounds"	5 October 2017	Thursday 7:30pm	1.166	1	
11	41	"Backyards Revealed"	8 October 2017	Sunday 7:00pm	1.571	1	
11	42	"Studio & Garage Begins"	9 October 2017	Monday 7:30pm	1.387	1	
11	43	"Studio & Garage Continues"	10 October 2017	Tuesday 7:30pm	1.192	1	
11	44	"Studio & Garage Continues & Final Walk Arounds"	11 October 2017	Wednesday 7:30pm	1.213	1	
12	45	"Studio & Garage Revealed"	15 October 2017	Sunday 7:00pm	1.511	1	
12	46	"Frontyard Begins"	16 October 2017	Monday 7:30pm	1.440	1	
12	47	"Frontyard Continues & Defects List"	17 October 2017	Tuesday 7:30pm	1.319	1	
12	48	"Frontyard Continues"	18 October 2017	Wednesday 7:30pm	1.216	1	
13	49	"Frontyards Revealed"	22 October 2017	Sunday 7:00pm	1.507	1	
13	50	"The Best of The Block"	23 October 2017	Monday 7:30pm	1.168	1	
13	51	"Open For Inspections"	24 October 2017	Tuesday 7:30pm	1.165	1	
14	52	"Grand Final/ Auctions"	29 October 2017	Sunday 7:00 pm	1.976	2	
14	52	"Winner Announced"	29 October 2017	Sunday 7:00 pm	2.255	1	

== Notes ==
- ^{a} Ratings data is from OzTAM and represents the live and same day average viewership from the 5 largest Australian metropolitan centres (Sydney, Melbourne, Brisbane, Perth and Adelaide).
- ^{b} In House 3 resided a secret vault of which the contents were unknown until it was opened. Whoever selected House 3 (Georgia & Ronnie) were able to open it and take ownership of the contents within. The vault contained $15,000 vouchers to Reece, Freedom Furniture, Neff & $5,000 in cash. The safe also included The Big Steal, which was two options, option 1 was to steal someone elses house & option 2 was to take the amount of money they spent on the 48 Hour challenge (which was $8,700) from another team. They chose option 2, to take money from another team, they took from Elyse & Josh.
- ^{c} The name of the house indicates the suburb the house use to belong to and was relocated from.
- ^{d} For this room, the teams were told they could make any room they'd like to, except for a bedroom. These are the rooms the teams chose to do:
  - Jason & Sarah - Second Living Room
  - Clint & Hannah - Second Living Room
  - Georgia & Ronnie - Second Living Room
  - Sticks & Wombat - Office Space
  - Elyse & Josh - Study Room
- ^{e} The original score of Jason & Sarah's Team Choice Room was 22, but lost a point due to Ronnie & Georgia prize in the previous room to take away one point from one team. The score was changed to 21.
- ^{f} The original winners would have been Ronnie & Georgia, but Elyse & Josh used an extra point they won in the "Bedroom Makeover Challenge" which ended them on the same score making them both the winning teams.
- ^{g} During the Master Suite Week, Jason & Sarah got well behind on their build and decided not to reveal a built room, as a result all the judges gave them zeroes, a first in The Block history. After results were revealed, they were told and warned that they need to complete the Master Suite whilst completing their Kitchen in the same week or they'll be kicked off The Block.
  - ^{g.1} Before the comments from the judges for the kitchens were revealed, Scotty told Jason & Sarah that the judges loved their completed Master Suite and are able to continue being contestants on The Block. Elyse & Josh initially got a score of 30, but due to a non-compliance issue with the gas cooktop each judge deducted 1/2 a point and Jason and Sarah were named winners and also received $10,000 cash.
- ^{h} The original score of Sticks & Wombats Hallway & Laundry was 27½, but they used a bonus point they won in the "Celebrity Cooking Challenge". Their score was changed to 28½.
- ^{i} The original score of Jason & Sarah's Backyard was 28, but because they didn't include the cubby house from the "Cubby House Maze Challenge", they were deducted 1 point. Their score was changed to 27.
