= Dan Foley =

Australian rules footballer

Personal information
- Full name: Daniel Joseph Foley
- Born: 25 October 1960 (age 66)
- Original team: West Perth
- Height: 193 cm (6 ft 4 in)
- Weight: 86 kg (190 lb)
- Position: Forward

Playing career^{1}
Years	Club	Games (Goals)
1980–83; 1986–88	West Perth	58 (92)
1983–1985	Richmond	13 (9)
- ^{1} Playing statistics correct to the end of 1985.

Career highlights
- West Perth leading goalkicker 1986

Daniel Joseph Foley (born 25 October 1960) is a former Australian rules footballer who played with Richmond in the Victorian Football League (VFL).

Foley, a centre half-forward, started his career at West Perth, the club his father Brian had played for. Brian Foley won the Sandover Medal in 1959.

He debuted for Richmond midway through the 1983 VFL season and finished the year with six appearances. A highlight was a five-goal haul in Richmond's round 18 win over eventual grand finalists Essendon. During his time at Richmond he struggled with injuries and played only one league game in 1984. In the 1985 pre-season, Foley trained with Melbourne, but returned to Richmond and made five further appearances.

After his time at Richmond ended, Foley played again with West Perth. He won both the club's best and fairest and leading goal-kicker awards in the 1986 WAFL season. He kicked 46 goals from 20 games.

In 2016, he and his wife Carleen are competing contestants on the Australian reality TV series The Block.
