= Daniel Foley (professor) =

Irish lexicographer and professor (1815–1874)

Daniel Foley (1815–1874) was a professor of Irish.

== Life ==
Foley was born at Tralee, County Kerry, Ireland in 1815. His parents were poor people, and he had never worn shoes, when he obtained employment in the shop of Patrick Grey in Tralee. Under the influence of a clergyman in the neighbourhood he left the Roman Catholic church, and was sent to study for ordination in the then established Church of Ireland at Trinity College Dublin. He was in time ordained, and took the degree of B.D., and obtained the prebend of Kilbragh, in the cathedral of Cashel, and the rectory of Templetuohy. Irish was his native tongue, and in 1849 he was appointed professor of that language in Trinity College Dublin, and held the office till 1861.

While holding this office he wrote a preface to a small Irish grammar by Mr. C.H.H. Wright, and An English-Irish Dictionary, intended for the use of Students of the Irish Language (Dublin 1855). This work was based on a dictionary prepared early in the nineteenth century by Thaddeus Connellan, but published without a date, long kept in sheets, and issued in Dublin from time to time with a variety of false title-pages. Foley altered some of the Irish interpretations, and added a good many words. Many of the Irish words are inventions of his own, as "fuam-ainm" (sound-name) for onomato-poeia; or paraphrases, as "duine" (person) for microcosm, "eudaigh" (clothes) for caparison; or errors due to defective education, as "ainis" (anise) for caraway. Trinity College Dublin made a grant towards the publication, but as a dictionary it is of no authority. Foley took an active part in opposition to the disestablishment of the Church of Ireland, and lectured on the subject in England.

He died at Blackrock, near Dublin, 7 July 1874, and was buried in the cemetery of Kill o' the Grange.
